= Cininha de Paula =

- Born: Maria Lupicinia Viana de Paula Gigliotti; 23 June 1959 (age 66); Rio de Janeiro, Brazil
- Occupations: Actress, director
- Spouse: Wolf Maya
- Children: Maria Maya
- Parent: Lupe Gigliotti (mother)

Maria Lupicinia Viana de Paula Gigliotti, known artistically as Cininha de Paula (born 23 June 1959) is a Brazilian actress and director.

She is the child of actress Lupe Gigliotti, and has as uncles Chico Anysio and Zelito Viana. Her cousins are actors Marcos Palmeira, Bruno Mazzeo, as well as comedian Nizo Neto. She is the mother of actress Maria Maya from her marriage with director and actor Wolf Maya.

Paula directed the programs Sai de Baixo and Sítio do Picapau Amarelo, along with novelas such as Cobras e Lagartos and Aquele Beijo. She was also at the front of the new version of Escolinha do Professor Raimundo, where Mazzeo played the lead role.

== Filmography as director ==
=== Telenovelas ===
Year	Title
2011	Aquele Beijo
2006	Cobras & Lagartos
1996	Salsa e Merengue

=== Films ===
Year	Title
2017	Duas de Mim
2018	Crô em Família
2020	De Perto Ela Não É Normal

=== Programs ===
Year	Title
2022	O Coro
2017	Brasil a Bordo
2015-2019	Escolinha do Professor Raimundo (nova geração)
2014	Sexo e as Negas
2013-2016	Pé na Cova
2010	A Vida Alheia
2008-2009	Toma Lá, Dá Cá
2003	450 anos da cidade de São Paulo (programa ao vivo)
2002-2005	Sítio do Picapau Amarelo (2001)
2001-2002	Sai de Baixo
2001-2002	Brava Gente
1999-2002	Gente Inocente
1999	O Belo e as Feras
1998-1999	Mulher (seriado)
1998-1999	Você Decide
1998-1999	50 anos de TV (Humor e Infantil)
1995-1996	Não Fuja da Raia
1991	Estados Anysios de Chico City
1990-1995	Escolinha do Professor Raimundo
1988	Grupo Escolacho
1987-1990	Chico Anysio Show
	O Nosso Amor A Gente Inventa

=== Theatre ===
Year	Title
2019-2020	Musical Achados e Perdidos
2018	Macbeth: Pelas Ruas da Cidade
2017	A Megera Domada O Musical
2013	Meu Amigo Bobby
2010	A Gaiola das Loucas
2003-2005	Este Alguém Maravilhoso que eu amei
2001	O Assalto
2000	Deu Browday na Cabeça
1998-1999	Somos Irmãs – de Sandra Louzada
1997	Um Gordo em Conquista
1996	“Viva Elvis”
1996	Pocachontas
1995-1996	Band-Age
1995-1996	A Menina e o Vento
1994-1995	O Homem da Pizza
1994	A Bruxinha que era Boa (supervisão)
1993	A Volta do Chico Mau (supervisão)
1993	Yentel
1992	Rock Rollou – show de rock
1992	Som Mu Caipira – show de música country
1991-1992	Perfume de Madona
1990-1991	Meu Primo Walter – comédia
1989	Radio Stars – show de música
1986	Uma História de Amor – infantil

== Filmography ==
Year	Title	Role	Note
2019-20	Escolinha do Professor Raimundo	Dona Escolástica	Guest appearance
2001	Brava Gente	Neighbor	Year: O morto do Encantado morre e pede passagem
1999	Malhação	Tia Nete	Season 5 appearance
1998	Hilda Furacão	Lucianara	
1996	O Fim do Mundo	Zizi Badaró	
1992	Anos Rebeldes	Dona Mariléa	
1990	Delegacia de Mulheres	Roseclair	
1985	De Quina pra Lua	Clodomira	
1985	Jogo Duro		
1984	Partido Alto	Salete	
1983	Champagne	Maria	
1982	Final Feliz	Kátia	
1982	Elas por elas	Virginia	
1979-1983	Os Trapalhões	Various personalities	
1977	Sítio do Picapau Amarelo	Ordélia	

== Awards ==
- 2005 - Prêmio Mídia Ativa (UNESCO International Prize) ... Best Children's TV Program “Sítio do Pica-Pau Amarelo"
- 2002 - Prêmio Bastidores ... Celebridade
- 2002/2003/2004 - Prêmio Qualidade Brasil ... Best Children's TV Program “Sítio do Pica-Pau Amarelo”
- 2001 - Prêmio Qualidade Brasil ... Best Children's TV Program “Gente Inocente”
- 1999 - Prêmio Sharp de Teatro ... Best Direction “Somos Irmãs”
- 1997 - Prêmio Sharp de Teatro ... Best Children's Special “Pocahontas”
- 1995 - Prêmio Coca Cola de Teatro Infantil ... Best Direction & Production “A Menina e o Vento”
- 1990 - New York International Films and TV Festival - Bronze medal - direction
- 1987 - Festival de Cinema da Venezuela ... Jogo Duro – Best Actress
- 1986 - Festival de Cinema de Fortaleza ... Jogo Duro – Best Actress
- 1985 - Prêmio APETESP ... Best Actress- Pô Romeu
- 1984 - Prêmio Revelação TV – APCA – SP ... Award as an actress - Partido Alto
- 1980 - Prêmio Mambembe ... Best production – Diamante de Gogol
- 1978 - Prêmio Mambembe ... Best Actress Reveal – Bruxinha que era Boa
