= Maria Maya =

Brazilian actress

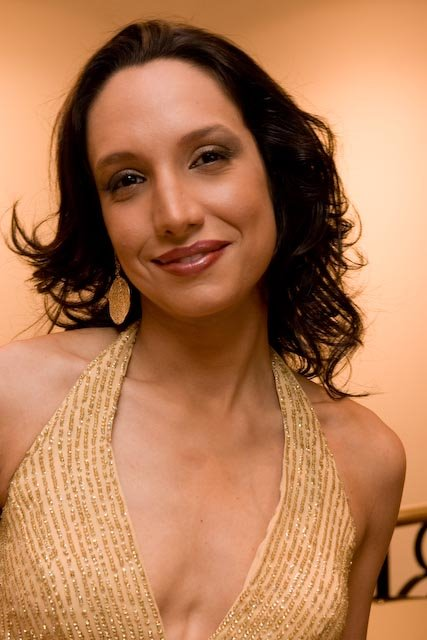
- Born: Maria Antônia Gigliotti Campos Maya; 29 June 1981 (age 44); Rio de Janeiro, Brazil
- Occupation: Actress
- Parent(s): Wolf Maya; Cininha de Paula
- Relatives: Chico Anysio (grand-uncle); Lupe Gigliotti (grandmother); Nizo Neto (second cousin); Marcos Palmeira (second cousin); Bruno Mazzeo (second cousin)

Maria Antônia Gigliotti Campos Maya (born 29 June 1981 in Rio de Janeiro) is a Brazilian actress.

== Biography and career ==
She is the daughter of director Wolf Maya and also an actress and director Cininha de Paula, grand-niece of comedian Chico Anysio, granddaughter of Lupe Gigliotti, second cousin of comedian and actor Nizo Neto, Marcos Palmeira and Bruno Mazzeo.

Maria started in the telenovela Cara & Coroa in 1995, where he played Nádia. This was followed by Kelly Bola one of its greatest figures in Salsa e Merengue in 1996. After the novel only came back to the novels in 2003; at the time married to actor Ernani Moraes, 25 years older than she, who is separated.

At this time three did miniseries: Hilda Furacão, A Muralha and O Quinto dos Infernos. His back was in the novels Chocolate com Pimenta where did the hypochondriac Lili, doctor's secretary Paul (played by Guilherme Piva). After he made his most prominent characters, Regininha, a lush samba Senhora do Destino, 2004. In 2006 he Sandrinha in Cobras & Lagartos.

In India – A Love Story played Inês, a girl who wore weird clothes and makeup and tried to warn his parents Melissa and Ramiro, played by Christiane Torloni and Humberto Martins, about the illness of his brother, Tarso (Bruno Gagliasso). Grandfather also helped to uncover some family secrets.

In 2009, he made a cameo appearance in Tempos de Paz, of Daniel Filho. In the same year and the following year starred in two parts, Play and A Loba de Ray-ban, in which she plays Fernanda Porto, who falls for Júlia Ferraz (Christiane Torloni).

In 2011, the novel is Aquele Beijo. In 2013 returns to the novels Amor à Vida, the plot she plays the Bolivian Alejandra.

== Filmography ==
=== Television ===
Year	Title	Role	Notes
1995	Cara & Coroa	Nádia Pinheiro Brandão	
1996	Salsa e Merengue	Kelly Bola	
1998	Hilda Furacão	Zora	
1998	Você Decide	Grace Kelly	Episode: "Seria Trágico, Se Não Fosse Cômico"
2000	A Muralha	Moatira	
2001	Brava Gente	Iracema	Episode: "Os Mistérios do Sexo"
2002	O Quinto dos Infernos	Maria Lélia	
2002	Sítio do Picapau Amarelo	Tonica Ventania	Season 2; Special participation
2003	Chocolate com Pimenta	Liliane Campos Soares (Lili)	
2004	Senhora do Destino	Regina Ferreira da Silva (Regininha)	
2005	Levando a Vida	Neidinha	Special Year End
2006	Cobras & Lagartos	Sandra Miranda Café (Sandrinha)	
2007	Conexão Xuxa	Herself	New Yellow Team participant
2008	Casos e Acasos	Sílvia	Episode: "O Desejo Escondido, o Cara Reprimido e o Livro Roubado"
2008	Toma Lá, Dá Cá	Mother Iraci	Episode: "Na Boca do Sapo"
2009	Caminho das Índias	Inês Cadore	
2011	Aquele Beijo	Raíssa Barbosa	
2013	Amor à Vida	Alejandra Reys Moreno	

=== Film ===
Year	Title	Role	Notes
2009	Se Eu Fosse Você 2	Saleswoman	Support cast
2009	Tempos de Paz	Nurse	Support cast

=== Theater ===
Title	Role
PLAY, sobre sexo, mentiras e videotape	Cíntia
A Loba de Ray-Ban	Fernanda Porto
Obituário Ideal	
