= Cubas =

District of Ferros, Minas Gerais, Brazil

Cubas is a Brazilian district of the mining city of Ferros, in the state of Minas Gerais. According to the Brazilian Institute of Geography and Statistics (IBGE), its population in 2010 was 1,385 inhabitants, 687 men and 698 women, with a total of 540 private households.
