= Adriana Garambone =

Brazilian actress (born 1970)

- Born: Adriana Garambone Guerra; 4 July 1970 (age 56); Rio de Janeiro, Brazil
- Occupation: Actress
- Years active: 1985–present
- Spouse: Cláudio Lins (1997–2000)
- Children: 1

Adriana Garambone Guerra (born 4 July 1970) is a Brazilian actress and former model. She became well-known when she performed on the telenovela Salsa e Merengue (1996). In 2005, she signed with RecordTV and gained further fame for her role as the antagonist in Essas Mulheres, followed up by roles in Amor e Intrigas (2007), Poder Paralelo (2009), Rebelde (2011), and Os Dez Mandamentos (2015).

== Career ==
Garambone began her career as a model in 1985, In September 1986, she participated in Garota do Fantástico, and in 1989, she was ranked as one of the five finalists in the Ford Models Supermodel of the World in their Brazil subsection, promoted by both Class Modelos and Ford Models. She made her debut in acting as a cast member of a rendition of the Shakespeare piece Romeo & Juliet, directed by Moacyr Góes. Her first telenovela was Salsa e Merengue, where she played Clarice, a young girl adopted to a millionaire couple. This was then followed byEsplendor as Marisa. Both were broadcast on TV Globo. She later also participated in the children's telenovela Caça Talentos, alongside Angélica, and starred in an episode of Você Decide. However, her most consequential work was a remake of the Broadway hit Chicago, in which she played Roxie Hart. While still in theatre, she performed in various pieces, including Cabaret Brasil and Relax... It's Sex, both by Wolf Maya, along with Cole Porter – Ele Nunca Disse que me Amava by Charles Möeller and Cláudio Botelho. In theare, she has been in many films directed by Hugo Carvana, namely O Homem Nu and Apolônio Brasil, Campeão da Alegria.

In 2005, she was hired by Rede Record to perform in the telenovela Essas Mulheres, where she played Adelaide Tavares do Amaral, her first villain role and a role that led her to further notoriety and a new cycle in her career. She participated in other novelas broadcast by Rede Record, including Prova de Amor (2006), as the brilliant lawyer Stela. In 2006, she became part of the main cast of the novela Bicho do Mato, where she played Silvia, and Amor e Intrigas, where she would play Débora. In 2009, she played the character of Maura Orlim in Poder Paralelo. In 2012, she would act in Rebelde as the comedic personality Eva, who is also the mother of the protagonist Roberta (Lua Blanco). She has also participated in specials such as As Mãos de Meu Filho, Casamento Blindado, O Amor e a Morte, and Milagres de Jesus.

She interpreted what became her biggest success and a highlight in her career, playing the role as Yunet in Os Dez Mandamentos. In 2017, she was invited to become part of the cast of O Rico e Lázaro, where she portrayed Amytis of Media, the Queen of Babylon and the wife of Nebuchadnezzar II. In 2018, she was confirmed to have also took part in Jesus, where she played one of characters from the Parable of the Two Debtors. This would be followed up by her participation in the similarly themed 2020 novela Gênesis, where she played Sarah.

== Personal life ==
At the beginning of the 1980s, Garambone lived for 9 months in Morocco when she was eleven as her father was the coach of a local football team. She took ballet classes at a school in Rio de Janeiro and later became a model. Having graduated with a bachelors' degree, she also took theatre courses at the Casa de Arte Laranjeiras. In 1995, she began to date actor Cláudio Lins, whom she married in 1997. They separated in 2000. In 2006, she would go on to date psychotherapist Arthur Papavero, with whom she has a child, Gael, born in 2015.

== Filmography ==
=== Television ===
Year	Title	Role	Notes
1995	História de Amor	Ana	Episode: "22 de novembro"
1996	Salsa e Merengue	Clarice Amarante Paes	
1998	Corpo Dourado	Soninha	Episode: "12 de janeiro"
1998	Caça Talentos	Bárbara Thompson	Season 4
1998	Você Decide	Vera	Episode: "Síndrome"
1999	Você Decide	Lucia	Episode: "O Feitiço da Lua da Arábia"
1999	Você Decide	Kátia	Episode: "La Mamma"
1999	Você Decide	Mari	Episode: "Admirável Mundo Novo"
1999	Mulher	Valderez	Episode: "Mãe Menina"
2000	Esplendor	Marisa Norman	
2001	Roda da Vida	Maria Aparecida Pereira (Cidinha)	
2002	O Quinto dos Infernos	Luísa Saucer	
2003	Sob Nova Direção	Clara	Episode: "O Pinto e o Pingüim"
2005	Essas Mulheres	Adelaide Tavares do Amaral	
2006	Prova de Amor	Estela Garcia	Episode: "20 de março–25 de maio"
2006	Bicho do Mato	Sílvia Schiller	
2007	Amor e Intrigas	Débora Junqueira de Albuquerque	
2009	Poder Paralelo	Maura Orlim Vilar	
2010	As Mãos de Meu Filho	Madame Novaes	Year end special
2011–12	Rebelde	Eva Messi Albuquerque	
2013	Casamento Blindado	Pillar	Year end special
2013	O Amor e a Morte	Maria	Year end special
2014	Milagres de Jesus	Raquel	Episode: "A Filha de Jairo"
2015	Os Dez Mandamentos	Yunet	
2017	Dancing Brasil	Special jury	Episode: "22 de maio"
2017	O Rico e Lázaro	Amitis	
2018	Jesus	Adela	
2019	O Verdadeiro Significado da Páscoa	Presenter	Easter Special
2021	Gênesis	Sara	Arc: Jornada de Abraão
2022	Todas as Garotas em Mim	Isis Sampaio	

=== Film ===
Year	Title	Role
1997	O Homem Nu	Vera
2003	Apolônio Brasil - O Campeão da Alegria	Gisa
2014	Vestido pra Casar	Mariazinha
2015	A Esperança é a Última que Morre	Vivian
2016	The Ten Commandments: The Movie	Yunet
2016	Milagres de Jesus	Raquel

== Theatre ==
Year	Title	Role
1990	A Escola dos Bufões	
1993	Romeo and Juliet	Julieta
1994	Edward II	
1997	Cabaret	Sally Bowles
1999	Aldir Blanc - Um Cara Bacana	
1999	Theatro Musical Brasileiro III	
2000	Cole Porter: Ele Nunca Disse que Me Amava	
2000	Relax...It's Sex	Roxana
2003	Essa Cara Não Existe	
2004	Chicago	Roxie Hart
2010	Gypsy	Gypsy Rose Lee
2013	How to Succeed in Business Without Really Trying	Hedy La Rue
2014	Os Saltimbancos Trapalhões: O Musical	Tigrana

== Awards and nominations ==
Year	Award	Category	Work	Result
2004	Prêmio Qualidade Brasil - SP	Best Musical Theatre Actress	Chicago	Nominated
2010	Prêmio Arte Qualidade Brasil	Best Musical Theatre Actress	Gypsy	Nominated
2012	Prêmio Contigo! de TV	Best Supporting Actress	Rebelde	Nominated
2013	Prêmio Cesgranrio de Teatro	Best Musical Actress	Como Vencer na Vida Sem Fazer Força	Nominated
2013	Prêmio APTR	Best Supporting Actress	Como Vencer na Vida Sem Fazer Força	Nominated
2015	Prêmio Reverência de Teatro	Main Actress	Os Saltimbancos Trapalhões	Nominated
2015	Troféu Observatório da Televisão	Best Novela Actress	Os Dez Mandamentos	Nominated
2015	Melhores do Ano Minha Novela	Villain	Os Dez Mandamentos	Nominated
2015	Melhores do Ano NaTelinha	Actress	Os Dez Mandamentos	Won
2016	Internet Trophy	Best Actress	Os Dez Mandamentos	Nominated
2019	Prêmio Brasil Musical	Best Supporting Actress	Pippin	Nominated
2019	Prêmio Brasil Musical	Best Ensemble	Pippin	Nominated
2021	Prêmio Área VIP	Best Actress	Gênesis	Nominated
2021	Internet Trophy	Best Novela Actress	Gênesis	Nominated
