= Rosi Campos =

Brazilian actress

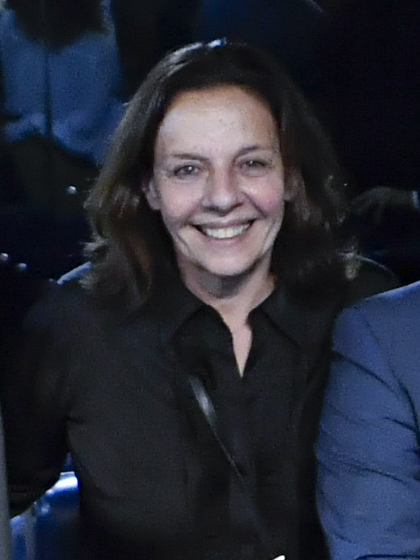
- Campos in 2022
- Born: Rosângela Martins Campos; 30 March 1954 (age 72); Bragança Paulista, São Paulo, Brazil
- Education: University of São Paulo
- Occupation: Actress
- Years active: 1973–present
- Spouse: Ary Brandi (m. 1979)
- Children: 1

Rosângela "Rosi" Martins Campos (born 30 March 1954) is a Brazilian actress.

== Biography ==
Campos was born in 1954 in Bragança Paulista. She graduated in Journalism at the Escola de Comunicações e Artes of the University of São Paulo (ECA). She worked for five years as press officer for record label Som Livre, before being an actress.

== Filmography ==
Television
Year	Title	Role
1980	Chega Mais	Aline
1989	Cortina de Vidro	Jussara
1990	Rá-Tim-Bum	Dona Fada Malvina (Episódio: A Bela Adormecida)
1990	Brasileiras e Brasileiros	Clarisse
1994	Éramos Seis	Paulette
1994	Castelo Rá-Tim-Bum	Bruxa Morgana Stradivarius Victorius (Tia Morgana)
1994	Telecurso 2000	Cida
1995	Cara & Coroa	Regininha (Margô)
1996	Salsa e Merengue	Daisy
1997	Sai de Baixo	Karen
1997	O Amor Está no Ar	Veronica de Jesus
1998	Hilda Furacão	Maria Tomba Homem
1998	Meu Bem Querer	Jorgete
1999	Vila Madalena	Marinalva
2000	Ô... Coitado!	Dona Capitú
2002	Desejos de Mulher	Marlene Motta
2003	A Casa das Sete Mulheres	Consuelo
2003	A Grande Família	Roberta
2004	Da Cor do Pecado	Edilasía Sardinha (Mamuska)
2005	América	Mercedes Gimenez
2005	Qual É, Bicho?	Lady Madalena Pequena Borborema (Dona Pequena)
2006	A Diarista	Dona Celina Borges (Episódio: Aquele da Copa)
2006	O Profeta	Rubia da Silva (Madame Rubia)
2007	A Grande Família	Vera
2008	A Favorita	Tereza Baterfer (Tuca)
2009	Cama de Gato	Genoveva Amâncio
2010	As Cariocas	Penélope
2011	Insensato Coração	Haidê Batista
2012	Salve Jorge	Cacilda
2012	Amor Eterno Amor	Teresa
2013	Joia Rara	Miquelina Vidal Pacheco Leão
2014	Now Generation	Rosa
2014	Lili, a Ex	Gina
2015	Babilônia	Zélia Fonseca
2016	Êta Mundo Bom!	Eponina Pereira Martino
2016	Criança Esperança	Edilasía Sardinha (Mamuska) (from Da Cor do Pecado) / Herself
2017	Tempo de Amar	Madame Urânia
2018	Tá no Ar: a TV na TV	Morgana Stradivarius
2018	O Tempo Não Para	Agustina Sabino Machado
2019	A Dona do Pedaço	Dorotéia de Souza Macondo (Dodô)
2024	A Caverna Encantada	Shirley Ramos
2026	Quem Ama Cuida	Diná

=== Cinema ===
Year	Title	Role
1988	Lua Cheia	
1988	A Mulher do Atirador de Facas (short film)	Seller
1990	Real Desejo	
1992	Oswaldianas	Cleaner
1994	Amor! (short film)	
1994	A Causa Secreta	Secretary
1996	Olhos De Vampa	
1996	Flores Ímpares (short film)	Rosa
1997	Ed Mort	Wanda
1997	O Amor Está no Ar	Verônica de Jesus
1998	O Cineasta da Selva	Narrator
1999	Castelo Rá-Tim-Bum - O Filme	Morgana Stradivarius
2001	Avassaladoras	Lúcia
2006	Tapete Vermelho	Maria
2008	Carmo	Serrana de Jesus Feliciano
2008	Visitando o Castelo	Dona Morgana
2009	O Menino da Porteira	Filoca
2010	Chico Xavier	Cleide
2011	Família Vende Tudo	
2014	Causa e Efeito	Medium
2014	The Great Victory	Célia
2015	Bem Casados	Suely
2015	Estro (short film)	Analyst
2016	Os Sonhos de Um Sonhador - A História de Frank Aguiar	Zulmira
2016	Anita	Tia Joana
2017	Eu Te Levo	Marta
2018	Crô em Família	Almerinda Passos
2021	Amigas de Sorte	Rita
2023	Fervo	Lúcia
2023	A Casa da Árvore	Neide
