= Walter Breda =

Brazilian actor

- Born: 25 December 1948 (age 76); Recife, Brazil
- Occupation(s): Actor, film producer
- Years active: 1976–present

Walter Breda de Souza (born 25 December 1948) is a Brazilian actor and film producer. He has been a prominent voice actor in radionovelas produced in Pernambuco state. As an actor, he has appeared in TV series such as América (2005), Amores Roubados (2014), and Deus Salve o Rei (2018).

== Filmography ==
=== Television ===
Year	Title	Character	Broadcaster
2020	Auto Posto	Nelson Lopes	Comedy Central Brasil
2019	Bom Sucesso	Agenor Peçanha (Peçanha)	Rede Globo
2019	Sob Pressão	Seu Alberto (episódio: "9")	Rede Globo
2018	Deus Salve o Rei	Enoque	Rede Globo
2016	A Cara do Pai	Aldair Moreira (2016–17)	Rede Globo
2016	A Terra Prometida	Orias	Rede Record
2015	Zé do Caixão	Antônio André Marins	Space
2015	Buuu - Um Chamado para a Aventura	Vital Brazil	Gloob
2014	Amores Roubados	Delegado Givaldo	Rede Globo
2012	Salve Jorge	Clóvis Feliciano da Silva	Rede Globo
2012	(fdp)		HBO Brasil
2012	Dercy de Verdade	Manuel Gonçalves	Rede Globo
2010	Malhação (18ª temporada)	Agenor Leal	Rede Globo
2010	Ti Ti Ti	Coronel Gastão Malta (Gastãozinho)	Rede Globo
2006	Cobras & Lagartos	Tufi	Rede Globo
2005	América	Ary Francisco Gomes (Seu Gomes)	Rede Globo
2003	Malhação 2003	Bigodão	Rede Globo
2003	Pequena Travessa	Rafael dos Santos	SBT
2002	Os Normais, Parece Indecente, Mas é Normal	Juca	Rede Globo
2002	O Quinto dos Infernos	Arcoverde	Rede Globo
2001	Presença de Anita	Antônio	Rede Globo
2001	Os Maias	Xavier	Rede Globo
2000	Esplendor	José	Rede Globo
2000	Uga Uga	Braz	Rede Globo
2000	Sandy e Júnior	Tio Walter	Rede Globo
1990	Boca do Lixo	Manoel	Rede Globo
1990	A História de Ana Raio e Zé Trovão	Padre Lizâneas	Rede Manchete
1987–1990	Bronco	Ivan Pires	Rede Globo
1985	Roque Santeiro	Francisco	Rede Globo

=== Film ===
Year	Title	Role
1990	Beijo 2348/72	
2018	Fica Mais Escuro Antes do Amanhecer	Operário
2022	Primavera	Prato 4
