= O Amor Está no Ar =

- Genre: Telenovela
- Created by: Alcides Nogueira
- Directed by: Wolf Maya
- Starring: Betty Lago; Natália Lage; Rodrigo Santoro; Eriberto Leão; Luís Melo; Natália do Vale; Nicette Bruno; Georgiana Góes; Oscar Magrini; Nuno Leal Maia; Lady Francisco; Tuca Andrada; Isabela Garcia; Caco Ciocler; Tato Gabus Mendes; Cláudia Lira
- Opening theme: "Love Is in the Air (Ballroom Remix)"
- Composer: John Paul Young
- Country of origin: Brazil
- Original language: Portuguese
- No. of episodes: 137

Production
- Producer: Carlos Araújo

Original release
- Network: TV Globo
- Release: 31 March – 6 September 1997

O Amor Está no Ar is a Brazilian telenovela produced and televised by TV Globo, aired between 31 March to 6 September 1997, in 137 chapters.

== Synopsis ==
The story takes place in the quiet and fictional city of Ouro Velho. Sofia Schneider (Betty Lago) is an exuberant woman of great class, intelligence, and solid ethical values inherited from her Jewish family, who emigrated to Brazil after the war. After the death of her husband, the aristocrat Victor Sousa Carvalho (Wolf Maya), Sofia takes over the business of the company Estrela Dourada, which explores water tourism in the local dam. But his mother-in-law, Úrsula (Nicette Bruno), does not accept the situation and begins a contest for control of the Sousa Carvalho family business.

Ursula has an ally, the unscrupulous Alberto (Luís Melo) married to his daughter Milica (Suzana Gonçalves). The relationship is complicated by Sofia's sister, Julia Schneider (Natália do Vale), arriving from Europe to join Alberto to remove her sister from the company.

Sofia has bigger problems at home. His daughter Luísa (Natália Lage), is a problematic adolescent and manipulated by her paternal grandmother. The relationship between mother and daughter gets more turbulent when they both fall in love with the same man, the aviator Léo (Rodrigo Santoro).

== Cast ==
Actor/Actress	Character
Betty Lago	Sofia Schneider Souza Carvalho Uchôa
Natália Lage	Luíza Schneider Souza Carvalho Uchôa (Lu)
Rodrigo Santoro	Leonardo Freitas Menezes (Léo)
Eriberto Leão	João Amaral Leite
Luís Melo	Alberto Santana
Natália do Vale	Júlia Schneider
Nicette Bruno	Úrsula Souza Carvalho Uchôa
Georgiana Góes	Frederica Guimarães Ribeiro (Cuca Chicotada)
Oscar Magrini	Pedro Olímpio
Lady Francisco	Candoca Guimarães Ribeiro (Candê)
Nuno Leal Maia	Alcebíades Guimarães Ribeiro (Guima)
Tuca Andrada	Vicente Souza Carvalho Uchôa
Marcelo Faria	Ivan Guimarães Ribeiro
Ana Paula Tabalipa	Camila
Caco Ciocler	Rabino Davi
Isabela Garcia	Flora
Tato Gabus Mendes	Filipe Schnaider
Cláudia Lira	Matilde Guimarães Ribeiro
Monah Delacy	Ester Schneider
Flávio Migliaccio	Peninha
Suzana Gonçalves	Emília Souza Carvalho / Milica
Rodrigo Santiago	Seabra
Micaela Góes	Beatriz Schneider Souza Carvalho Uchôa
Lupe Gigliotti	Tosca
Ivan de Almeida	Teobaldo
Antônio Grassi	Lacerda
Helena Ramos	Suzete
Tonico Pereira	Chicão (Francisco)
Vera Mancini	Chimbica
Renato Rabello	Gregório
Cláudia Provedel	Izabel Guimarães Ribeiro
Alexandre Barbalho	Dr. Machado
Thierry Figueira	Rodrigo
Luíza Curvo	Tatiana Guimarães Ribeiro
Dan Stulbach	Horácio
Carla Fioroni	Alaíde
Patrick de Alencar	Daniel Schneider Souza Carvalho Uchôa
Elaine Mickely	Carla
Manitou Felipe	Lucas
Clara Garcia	Lizete
Ariela Goldman	Heloísa
Gilles Gwizdek	Maciel
