= Henri Castelli =

Brazilian television actor

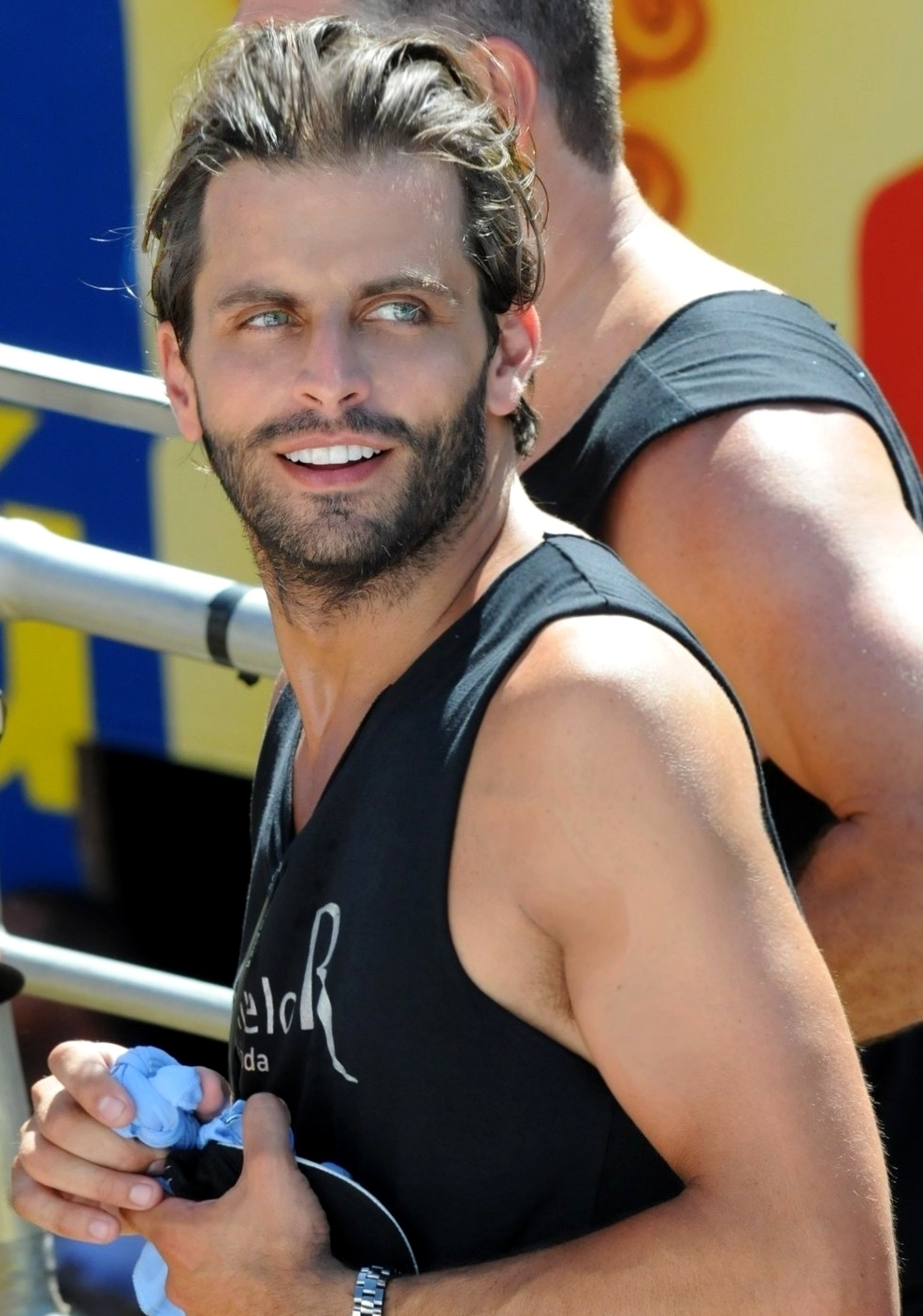
- Henri at Bahian Carnival in 2012
- Born: Henri Lincoln Fernandes Nascimento; 10 February 1978 (age 48); São Bernardo do Campo, São Paulo, Brazil
- Occupation: Actor
- Years active: 1998–present
- Height: 1.87 m (6 ft 2 in)
- Spouse: Isabeli Fontana (m. 2005; div. 2007)
- Children: 2

Henri Lincoln Fernandes Nascimento (born February 10, 1978), known as Henri Castelli, is a Brazilian actor.

== Career ==
Castelli was hired by Rede Globo in 1998 to make a small participation in the miniseries Hilda Furacão and in the telenovela Pecado Capital as Lobato, a supporting actor. In the following years he acted as Dino, Pércio, Breno and José de Castro in the telenovelas Esplendor, As Filhas da Mãe, Um Anjo Caiu do Céu and O Quinto dos Infernos, respectively.

Castelli's first role as protagonist was in the ninth season of Malhação in 2002, where he starred Pedro Rodrigues. In 2004 he gave life to his first villain, Jorge Junqueira in Como uma Onda. Castelli played a short time in Belíssima, due to her character having a mysterious death at the beginning of the plot. In 2006 he acted once again as a villain, this time Estevão Pacheco in Cobras & Lagartos. Castelli also co-starred in Caras & Bocas the character Vicente Foster.

Eight years after his last miniseries, he starred in 2010 in Na Forma da Lei as the protagonist Edgar Mourão. After 7 years, in 2013 he returned to act as main character in a telenovela, interpreting Cassiano Soares in Flor do Caribe, along with Grazi Massafera. In 2015, Castelli lived another villain, Gabriel Brenner (Gabo) in I Love Paraisópolis.

== Personal life ==
Castelli married Brazilian supermodel Isabeli Fontana on December 10, 2005 and their son, Lucas, was born on October 23, 2006, in São Paulo. Fontana and Castelli divorced in 2007. In 2008, he began dating the actress Fernanda Vasconcellos. The couple ended the relationship in 2012.

On January 11, 2014, Castelli's girlfriend, journalist Juliana DeSpirito, gave birth to his daughter Maria Eduarda. He is a São Paulo FC fan.

== Filmography ==
=== Television ===
Year	Title	Role	Notes
1998	Hilda Furacão	Celso	Participation
1998	Pecado Capital	Lobato	
1999	Você Decide	Rodrigo	Episode: "O Lobisomem"; Episode: "O Dilema de Rosane"
2000	Esplendor	Dino	
2001	As Filhas da Mãe	Pércio	
2001	Um Anjo Caiu do Céu	Breno	
2002	O Quinto dos Infernos	José de Castro do Canto e Melo	
2002	Malhação	Pedro Rodrigues	Season 9
2003	Celebridade	Hugo Magno Soares	
2004	Como uma Onda	Jorge Junqueira (J.J.)	
2005	Bang Bang	Jangy	
2005	Belíssima	Pedro Assunção	
2006	Cobras & Lagartos	Estevão Pacheco	
2008	Casos e Acasos	Sérginho	Episode: "A Fuga Arriscada, a Nova Namorada e o Recheio do Bolo"
2008	Casos e Acasos	Marlon	Episode: "A Noiva, o Desempregado e o Fiscal"
2008	Casos e Acasos	Marcelo	Episode: "O Ex, a Promoção e o Vizinho"
2008	Faça Sua História	Pedrão	Episode: "O Noivo Sumiu"
2009	Caras & Bocas	Vicente Foster	
2010	Na Forma da Lei	Edgar Mourão	
2011	Araguaia	Rudy	
2011	O Astro	Felipe Cerqueira	
2012	Acampamento de Férias 3	Simão	
2012	Gabriela	Rômulo Vieira	
2013	Flor do Caribe	Cassiano Soares	
2015	I Love Paraisópolis	Gabriel Brenner (Gabo)	
2016	Sol Nascente	Ralf Tattoo	
2017	Tempo de Amar	Teodoro Magalhães	
2019	Malhação: Toda Forma de Amar	Carlos Madureira	Season 27
2024	Dança dos Famosos	Contestant	Season 21
2026	Big Brother Brasil	Housemate (Withdrew)	Season 26
