= Roberto Drummond =

Brazilian journalist and writer

- Born: December 21, 1933; Ferros, Minas Gerais
- Died: June 21, 2002 (aged 68); Belo Horizonte, Minas Gerais
- Citizenship: Brazil
- Occupations: Journalist, writer
- Writing career
- Language: Brazilian

Roberto Francis Drummond (Ferros, Minas Gerais, December 21, 1933 – Belo Horizonte, June 21, 2002) was a Brazilian journalist and writer.

== Biography ==
Before settling, from adolescence onward, in Belo Horizonte, the writer's family lived in Guanhães, Araxá, and Conceição do Mato Dentro. He was the son of engineer and farmer Francisco Alvarenga Drummond and Ricarda de Paiva Drummond.

He began writing short stories and novellas at the age of 13. In the 1950s, he dropped out of the science track in school and began working in journalism. His first job was at the now-defunct Folha de Minas, in the capital of Minas Gerais. At age 28, he became editor of the magazine Alterosa, which was shut down by the Military Dictatorship in 1964. He worked for a year in Rio de Janeiro, returning to Belo Horizonte in 1966, where he began writing sports columns and chronicles.

His literary success began with his first book, A morte de DJ em Paris (The Death of DJ in Paris), in 1971. Re-released in 1975, it broke sales records and earned him the Prêmio Jabuti for best new author. In the 1980s, he entered a new phase of his literary production with the publication of Hitler manda lembranças (Hitler Sends Regards). His greatest success was the novel Hilda Furacão, published in 1991, and adapted for television in 1998 as a successful miniseries by Rede Globo.

Roberto died on June 21, 2002, in Belo Horizonte.

== Works ==
- A morte de DJ em Paris (1971)
- O dia em que Ernest Hemingway morreu crucificado (1978)
- Sangue de coca-cola (1980)
- Quando fui morto em Cuba (1982)
- Hitler manda lembranças (1984)
- Ontem à noite era sexta-feira (1988)
- Hilda Furacão (1991)
- Inês é morta (1993)
- O homem que subornou a morte & Outras histórias (1993)
- Magalhães: navegando contra o vento (1994)
- O cheiro de Deus (2001)
- Dia de São Nunca à tarde
- Os mortos não dançam valsa
- O Estripador da Rua G
- Uma Paixão em Preto e Branco
