= Sol Nascente =

Brazilian telenovela

- Also known as: Rising Sun
- Genre: Telenovela
- Created by: Walther Negrão; Suzana Pires; Júlio Fischer
- Directed by: Marcelo Travesso; Leonardo Nogueira
- Starring: Giovanna Antonelli; Bruno Gagliasso; Leticia Spiller; Marcello Novaes; Henri Castelli; Rafael Cardoso; Aracy Balabanian; Francisco Cuoco; Luís Melo; Jean Pierre Noher; Claudia Ohana; Marcelo Faria; Giovanna Lancellotti; Marcello Melo Jr.; Juliana Alves
- Opening theme: "Minha Felicidade" by Roberta Campos
- Country of origin: Brazil
- Original language: Portuguese
- No. of episodes: 175

Production
- Production locations: Ilha Grande; Arraial do Cabo; Armação dos Búzios; Guararema
- Camera setup: Multi-camera
- Running time: 43 minutes
- Production company: Estúdios Globo

Original release
- Network: TV Globo
- Release: 29 August 2016 – 21 March 2017

Sol Nascente (English: Rising Sun) is a Brazilian telenovela produced and broadcast by TV Globo. It premiered on 29 August 2016, replacing Êta Mundo Bom!.

Created by Walther Negrão, Suzana Pires and Júlio Fischer, in collaboration with Jackie Vellego and Fausto Galvão. The telenovela is directed by Marcelo Travesso and Leonardo Nogueira.

Features performances by Giovanna Antonelli, Bruno Gagliasso, Rafael Cardoso, Francisco Cuoco and Aracy Balabanian, Marcello Novaes, Henri Castelli, Jean Pierre Noher, Claudia Ohana, Marcelo Faria, Luís Melo, Marcello Melo Jr. and Leticia Spiller in the main roles.

== Plot ==
Set in the fictional Village of the Sol Nascente, the plot follows the journey of two friends from different backgrounds: the grandson of Italian immigrants Gaetano and Geppina, who came to and Brazil to escape the mafia, Mario is a longtime friend of Alice, raised by the Japanese Kazuo Tanaka as the adopted daughter, along with cousins; Yumi, Hiromi and Hideo. The friendship is shattered when Mario comes out in love with his childhood friend, Alice who plans to study in Japan for two years. Immature and impulsive, he will have to change his ways to conquer Alice, who is engaged to César, seemingly a perfect man, but all he wants is her money.

== Cast ==
Actor/Actress	Character
Giovanna Antonelli	Alice Tanaka
Bruno Gagliasso	Mario de Angeli
Letícia Spiller	Lenita
Marcello Novaes	Vittorio
Henri Castelli	Ralf
Rafael Cardoso	César
Aracy Balabanian	Geppina
Francisco Cuoco	Gaetano
Luís Melo	Kazuo Tanaka
Cláudia Ohana	Loretta
Laura Cardoso	Sinhá
Marcelo Faria	Felipe
Giovanna Lancellotti	Milena
Marcello Melo Jr	Tiago
Juliana Alves	Dora
Cinara Leal	Vanda
Pablo Morais	Nuno
Val Perré	Quirino
Tatiana Tibúrcio	Chica
Érika Januza	Júlia
João Cortes	Peppino
Emílio Orciollo Netto	Damasceno
Luma Costa	Elisa
Miwa Yanagizawa	Mieko
Jacqueline Sato	Yumi
Carol Nakamura	Hiromi
Paulo Chun	Hideo
Renata Dominguez	Sirlene
Márcio Kieling	Bernardo
Jean Pierre Noher	Patrick
Sylvia Bandeira	Ana Clara
Maria Joana	Carol
Flávia Guedes	Kika
Ana Lima	Paula
Caroline Verban	Ciça
Roberta Piragibe	Nanda
Rick Garcia	Pescoço
Felipe Mago	Wagner
Lucas Sapucahy	Cauã
Pâmela Tomé	Paty

== Soundtrack ==
=== Volume 1 ===
Sol Nascente -Vol. 1

Soundtrack album by Various artists
- Released: 26 August 2016
- Label: Som Livre

No.	Title	Artist(s)	Length
1.	"Minha Felicidade"	Roberta Campos
2.	"Um Tanto"	Suricato
3.	"Coisa Linda"	Tiago Iorc
4.	"Little Bit of Love"	Eric Silver
5.	"Get You Back"	Mayer Hawthorne
6.	"Muito Estranho (Cuida Bem de Mim)"	Nando Reis
7.	"Come Prima"	Caetano Veloso & Gilberto Gil
8.	"Lampejo"	Samuel Rosa & Lô Borges
9.	"Faz Tempo"	Banda do Mar
10.	"Kobune"	Fernanda Takai
11.	"Adventure of a Lifetime"	Coldplay
12.	"Don't Love Me"	Moby
13.	"Uma Vida Só"	O Rappa
14.	"Nós Vamos Invadir sua Praia"	Raimundos

=== Volume 2 ===
Sol Nascente - Vol. 2

Soundtrack album by Various artists
- Released: 3 February 2017
- Label: Som Livre

No.	Title	Artist(s)	Length
1.	"Era Domingo"	Zeca Baleiro
2.	"Se Namorar"	Ivo Mozart
3.	"I Momenti Felice"	Nicola Lama
4.	"Anywhere"	Passenger
5.	"O Sole Mio"	Paolo
6.	"Can't Take My Eyes Off You"	Jamz
7.	"Sublime"	Jammil e Uma Noites
8.	"Estrada Afora"	Tiago Abravanel
9.	"Ilusão (Ilusion)"	Marisa Monte
10.	"Changes"	Charles Bradley
11.	"Way Down We Go"	Kaleo
12.	"Jamburana"	Dona Onete
13.	"O Descobridor dos Sete Mares"	Ryandro Campos
14.	"Jailhouse Rock"	Elvis Presley
15.	"Lanterna dos Afogados Cássia Eller"	Cássia Eller
16.	"Só Eu e Você"	Illy
17.	"Vivi"	Gigi D'Alessio
18.	"Unknown"	Little Nation
19.	"Hold Back the River"	James Bay

== Ratings ==
Timeslot	# Eps.	Premiere		Finale		Rank	Season	Average viewership
Timeslot	# Eps.	Date	Viewers (in points)	Date	Viewers (in points)	Rank	Season	Average viewership
Mondays—Saturdays; 6:15 pm	175	29 August 2016	25	21 March 2017	27		2016–17	21

The first episode of Sol Nascente recorded a viewership rating of 25.4 points in Greater São Paulo an index recorded during the premiere of its predecessor, Êta Mundo Bom!.

Preceded by Êta Mundo Bom! 18 January 2016–26 August 2016	Globo 6 p.m. timeslot telenovela 29 August 2016–21 March 2017	Succeeded by Novo Mundo; 22 March 2017–25 September 2017
