= Cláudia Lira =

Brazilian actress

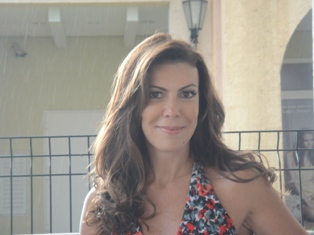
- Cláudia Lira in 2012
- Born: Cláudia Vasconcelos Lira; December 16, 1965 (age 59); João Pessoa, Paraíba, Brazil
- Occupations: Actress; Producer
- Spouse: João Marcelo Araújo

Cláudia Vasconcelos Lira (December 16, 1965) is a Brazilian actress.

== Biography ==
=== Early years and education ===
Claudia was born in João Pessoa, capital of the state of Paraíba, in 1965. While still a child, she moved to the city of Rio de Janeiro. She studied performing arts at Casa das Artes de Laranjeiras (CAL), a traditional theater school in Rio.

Even as a child, she performed in children's plays such as O Lenhador da Floresta, Os Germens da Discordia, for which she won the Coca-Cola Award for Best Actress, and Dama e o Vagabundo, for which she also won the Coca-Cola Award for Best Actress.

=== Career ===
Her first role on television was in the TV Globo miniseries Tarcísio & Glória, where she played Olga. Her debut in the network's soap operas was in Bambolê, where she played Orsina. In 1996, she made her film debut with the movie Doces Poderes.

She appeared in several soap operas on the network, including Renascer (1993), História de Amor (1996), Uga-Uga (2000), Bang Bang (2005), Caminho das Índias (2009). The actress also appeared in series and other programs on the network, including Chiquinha Gonzaga (1999), Zorra Total (1999), and O Quinto dos Infernos (2002). In 2007, the actress appeared in the soap opera Dance Dance Dance broadcast by TV Bandeirantes. In the same year, In 2007, she won te Prêmio Shell in the special category for her initiative to build the Solar de Botafogo Cultural Center in the neighborhood of the same name. In 2012, he moved to TV Record, where she worked on the soap opera Rebelde.

In 2016, she returned to Globo to work on the soap opera Velho Chico. Two years later, she joined the cast of Segundo Sol.

== Personal life ==
She married Leonardo Franco and they had a daughter, Valentina, born in 2006. She is currently married to businessman João Marcelo Araújo.

In 2020, she was on the verge of death in a hospital in Rio de Janeiro due to medical negligence caused by a failure to identify that the actress had appendicitis, spending ten days in intensive care.

== Filmography ==
=== Television ===
Year	Title	Role	Notes
1986	Tarcísio & Glória	Orsina	
1987	Bambolê	Orsina	
1990	Mico Preto	Jurema Barbosa	Debut
1992	Perigosas Peruas	Manuela Torremolinos	
1993	Renascer	Valquíria Pereira (Kika)	
1993	Guerra sem Fim	Nina Salles	
1995	Malhação	Carla do Nascimento	
1995	História de Amor	Vanda Furtado Diniz (Vandinha)	
1996	Colégio Brasil	Teresa Silveira Rocha	
1997	O Amor Está no Ar	Matilde	
1998	Corpo Dourado	Débora	
1999	Mulher	Letícia Sampaio	
1999	Chiquinha Gonzaga	Suzana Teixeira	
1999–00	Zorra Total	Maria Aparecida	Sketch-comedy series, recurring role
2000	Uga-Uga	Suzete Manhães (Suzy)	
2001	Os Normais	Antônia dos Santos (Tônia)	Episode: "Dar um Tempo é Normal"
2001	As Filhas da Mãe	Dalete	
2002	O Quinto dos Infernos	Rita Gomes	
2002	Coração de Estudante	Matilde	Special appearance
2003	Agora É que São Elas	Gardênia	
2003	Os Normais	Solange Tavares	Episode: "Te Respeito e Trair Direito"
2005	Bang Bang	Diva Cardoso Lewis	
2007	Dance Dance Dance	Lígia Vasconcelos (Diana Flag)	
2008	Guerra e Paz	Mara Ferraz	Episode: "Lavanda & Vermelho"
2009	Caminho das Índias	Nayana Kumar	
2009	Toma Lá, Dá Cá	Ademilde Soares	Episode: "Eu Também Compro Essa Mulher"
2009	Geral.com	Iara Meirelles	
2011	Rebelde	Elizabeth Costa (Beth)	
2016	Velho Chico	Iara (Mãe-d'água)	
2018	Segundo Sol	Glorinha Tibiriçá	Character appears in later plot

=== Cinema ===
Year	Title	Role	Notes
1996	Doces Poderes	Tatiana Lins	Film debut
2003	Clandestinidade	Mariângela	Short film
2005	Primavera	Virgínia	Short film
2015	O Tempo Feliz Que Passou	Masé	
2016	Aspirina para dor de cabeça	Isabel Cristina	Short film
2019	Incursão	Nicole	Thriller film

== Prizes ==
Year	Prize	Work	Category	Result	Ref.
2007	Prêmio Shell	Initiative to build the Solar de Botafogo Cultural Center	Special	Won	
