= Cara & Coroa =

- Genre: Drama
- Created by: Antônio Calmon
- Written by: Ângela Carneiro; Lílian Garcia; Eliane Garcia
- Directed by: Wolf Maya
- Starring: Christiane Torloni; Miguel Falabella; Luís Melo; Victor Fasano; Maitê Proença; Lúcia Veríssimo; Marcos Paulo; Rosi Campos
- Theme music composer: Torcuato Mariano
- Opening theme: "Tocar Você" by Edmon Costa
- Country of origin: Brazil
- Original language: Portuguese
- No. of episodes: 215

Original release
- Network: TV Globo
- Release: July 24, 1995 – March 30, 1996

Cara & Coroa is a Brazilian telenovela produced by TV Globo. It aired from July 24, 1995 to March 30, 1996. The telenovela is written by Antônio Calmon and directed by Wolf Maya.

== Plot ==
Fernanda is a wealthy, flirtatious woman who doesn't relate well with her family. About to marry Rubinho, she runs away from the church and ends up marrying her old boyfriend Miguel, with whom she has a son named Pedro, raised by him and his grandfather, Antenor. Later, Fernanda also leaves Miguel and goes after his brother Mauro, an unscrupulous lawyer who is only interested in her money. Fernanda is unhappy living with Mauro and discovers that he is having an affair with Heloísa, a dangerous and cruel woman. Fernanda shoots at Mauro, but the bullet hits an innocent stranger and kills him. Swearing innocence, she tries to escape, but is arrested.

Thirteen years pass and Fernanda hasn't forgotten Rubinho. Heloísa and Mauro discover that a look-alike of Fernanda's is in prison with her: Vitória, or Vivi, unjustly imprisoned along with her friend Margot, after both were accused of a robbery they didn't commit.

Vitória and Fernanda share the same cell and, as soon as they meet, they find the physical resemblance between them strange. On the eve of her release, Fernanda has a stroke when she finds out that Mauro has married Heloísa and has a daughter named Isabel, known as Belinha; so the couple put Fernanda in a clinic and the doctors tell them that it will be almost impossible for her to recover. Mauro and Heloísa kidnap Vivi, who has just been granted parole, and force her to take Fernanda's place so that they can seize the money she would receive from Miguel's divorce. Vivi, threatened with death, accepts for fear of going back to jail.

As Fernanda, Vivi faces the fury of many people who have every reason to hate her: Miguel, the betrayed husband; Pedro, the son who grew up without his mother's love; Rubinho, the fiancé abandoned at the altar; and the revolt of her own family, who have never forgiven her for her past. Vivi, as well as posing as someone with a completely opposite temperament to her own, is vilified for acts for which she was not responsible. Over time, however, people begin to realize that Fernanda has come back from prison much changed.

== Cast ==
- Christiane Torloni as Fernanda Gusmão Santoro and Vitória "Vivi" Figueiredo / Vitória Gusmão Santoro
- Luís Melo as Rubens "Rubinho" Del Rey Villar
- Victor Fasano as Miguel Alcântara Prates
- Miguel Falabella as Mauro Alcântara Prates
- Lúcia Veríssimo as Nadine Gonçalves
- Marcos Paulo as Heitor Morales Gonçalves
- Alessandra Negrini as Natália Gusmão Santoro
- Rosi Campos as Margô da Conceição Santos / Regina "Regininha"
- Carlos Zara as Antenor Alcântara Prates
- Hugo Carvana as Aníbal Santoro
- Arlete Salles as Cacilda Montez
- Mauro Mendonça as Kléber Del Rey Villar
- Arlete Montenegro as Leda Del Rey Villar
- Louise Cardoso as Laura "Laurinha" Del Rey Villar Matos
- Antônio Grassi as Rômulo Matos
- Marcio Garcia as Guilherme "Guiga" Rocha
- Thierry Figueira as Pedro Alcântara Prates
- Chica Xavier as Dinda
- Tony Tornado as Anselmo
- Wolf Maya as Cícero Pinheiro Brandão
- Cláudia Alencar as Martina Pinheiro
- Marcos Pasquim as Cosme Del Rey Villar
- Mônica Fraga as Helena "Leninha" Gusmão Santoro
- Juliana Baroni as Júlia Villar Matos
- Natália Lage as Cristina "Kika" Villar Matos
- Walther Verve as Pepe Montez Caruso
- Maria Maya as Nádia Pinheiro
- Carmo Dalla Vecchia as Fábio "Fabinho" Pinheiro
- Cláudia Liz as Debbie
- Carol Machado as Clara
- Danielle Winits as Diana
- Heitor Martinez as Mobral
- Bruno Marques as Alex
- Karina Mello as Ana
- Miriam Freeland as Mariana
- Manitou Felipe as Sabará
- Nádia Bambirra as Marisol
- Luiza Curvo as Maria Isabel "Belinha" Souto Brandão de Alcântara Prates
- Luiz Fernando Camarão as Eugênio "Geninho" Alcântara Prates

== Production ==
After works aimed at a young audience such as Top Model (1989) and Vamp (1991), Antônio Calmon revealed that it bothered him "to do things only for young people" and decided to renew himself by changing the target audience of his work.

The telenovela is set in the fictional town of Porto do Céu. Most of the scenes were shot in the city of Búzios, in Rio de Janeiro. Part of Rua das Pedras, Porto das Pedras' famous and trendy location, was built as a set. The prison scenes were shot partly in the Carandiru prison and partly on set.

In the scenes in which the twins acted together, chromakey and memory-head were used, technologies previously used in Mulheres de Areia (1993) to give more authenticity to the scenes in which Ruth and Raquel appeared together. Forty sets were created in the various studios, totaling 200 settings.

It marked the return of actresses Rosi Campos, Marilena Ansaldi and Walderez de Barros to Rede Globo: Campos and Ansaldi had been away from the network since 1986, when they took part in the telenovelas Roda de Fogo and Selva de Pedra, respectively; Walderez had been away from the network since 1989, when she took part in the miniseries Sampa. It was the debut of actor Luís Melo in telenovelas. The actor was already well known in Brazilian theater and accepted the invitation to star in Cara & Coroa after rejecting several proposals from the broadcaster. It was also the first telenovela for Juliana Baroni, who was already known to children as Paquita.

Changes were made during production to prevent it from being too similar to the show O Outro.

== Broadcast ==
The original broadcast on TV Globo aired from July 24, 1995 to March 30, 1996. In 2021, the channel announced plans to air reruns of the series. However, copyright issues delayed the reruns. Canal Viva considered optioning the series for reruns in 2021, but instead chose to air the similar series Paraíso Tropical. A rerun of the show premiered on Canal Viva on September 9, 2024.
