= O Quinto dos Infernos =

DVD cover

O Quinto dos Infernos is a 2002 Brazilian historical comedy television miniseries. It was written by Carlos Lombardi, and directed by Wolf Maya and 48 episodes were produced. The protagonist was Marcos Pasquim.

== Cast ==
- Marcos Pasquim - D. Pedro I
- Luana Piovani - Domitila de Castro Canto e Melo
- Humberto Martins - Francisco Gomes, "Chalaça"
- Betty Lago - Carlota Joaquina
- André Mattos - D. João VI
- Danielle Winits - Manuela
- Bruna Lombardi - Branca
- Caco Ciocler - D. Miguel
- Cláudia Abreu - Amélia de Leuchtemberg
- Nair Bello - Giovanna/Marquesa di Pesto
- Eva Wilma - D. Maria I
- José Wilker - Marquês de Marialva
- Lima Duarte - Conde dos Arcos
- Érika Evantini - Imperatriz Leopoldina
- Pedro Paulo Rangel - Camargo
- Paulo Goulart - José Bonifácio
- Carolina Ferraz - Naomi
- Nathalia Timberg - Xuxu
- John Herbert - Lobato
- Maria Padilha - Emengarda Cauper
- Flávio Galvão - Cauper
- Roger Gobeth - Plácido
- Taís Araújo - Dandara
- Ana Furtado - D. Maria Teresa
- Bruno Garcia - Carlos
- Carlos Bonow - Gastão
- Françoise Forton - Miou-Miou
- Nuno Leal Maia - Coronel João de Castro Canto e Melo, Visconde de Castro
- Mauro Mendonça - Arcebispo Melo
- Mário Gomes - Marquês de Barbacena
- Geraldo Pestalozzi - Nolasco
- Henri Castelli - Augusto
- Diogo Morgado - Dom Carlos
- Joana Limaverde - Benedita
- Gabriel Braga Nunes - Felício
- Bettina Vianny - Escolástica
- Mário Frias - Manuelzinho
- Licurgo Spínola - Fernão
- Vanessa Lóes - Mariana
- Mila Moreira - Inês
- Rachel Nunes - Lalá
- Maria Maya - Lelé
- Carolina Galvão - Lili
- Carlos Gregório - Rodrigo
- Antônio Grassi - Capitão Vidigal
- Othon Bastos - Soares
- Cláudia Lira - Rita
- Ângelo Paes Leme - Emanuel
- Odilon Wagner - Ernesto
- Tamara Taxman - Augusta
- Miguel Thiré - Augusto
- Jonas Bloch - Francisco I
- Cláudia Alencar - Amapola
- Adriana Garambone - Luísa
- Edwin Luisi - Saucer
- Marilu Bueno - Violante
- Oswaldo Louzada - Alencastro
- Mônica Torres - Kate
- Marcos Breda - Frei
- Roberto Bomtempo - Sardinha
- Camilo Bevilacqua - Comandante Manuel Morais
- Cecília Dassi - Princesa Maria da Glória
- Walter Breda - Arcoverde
- Thaís de Campos - Arminda
- Geórgia Gomide - Aurora
- Helena Fernandes - Chiquinha
- Luís Guilherme - Conde de Bagaceira
- Dartagnan Jr. - Amigo de Chalaça
- Paulo Gorgulho - Juvêncio
- Débora Duarte - Amália
- Caio Junqueira - Diogo
- Carlos Thiré - Eduardo
- Juliana Silveira - Rosaura
- Jonathan Nogueira - Guarda
- Maria Cristina Gatti - Dona da pousada
- Monah Delacy - Madre Superiora
- Tatiana Issa - Urbana
- Pia Manfroni - Carmem
- Vanessa Machado - Eugênia
- Catarina Abdalla
- Eduardo Conde - Desoausex
- Fábio Junqueira - Avelar
- Cláudio Corrêa e Castro - Dr. Vieira
- José Carlos Sanches
