= Aquele Beijo =

- Genre: Telenovela
- Created by: Miguel Falabella
- Directed by: Roberto Talma; Cininha de Paula
- Starring: Giovanna Antonelli; Marília Pêra; Herson Capri; Ricardo Pereira; Grazi Massafera; Sheron Menezzes; Cláudia Jimenez; Diogo Vilela
- Narrated by: Miguel Falabella
- Theme music composer: Antônio Carlos Jobim and Vinícius de Moraes
- Opening theme: "Garota de Ipanema" - Xuxa and Daniel Jobim.
- Country of origin: Brazil
- Original language: Portuguese
- No. of episodes: 155

Original release
- Network: TV Globo
- Release: October 17, 2011 – April 13, 2012

Aquele Beijo (English: That Kiss) is a Brazilian telenovela produced by TV Globo. It is written by Miguel Falabella, Flávio Marinho and Antonia Pellegrino, and directed by Roberto Talma and Cininha de Paula, it premiered on October 17, 2011, replacing Morde & Assopra.

== Plot ==
Cláudia (Giovanna Antonelli) and Rubinho (Victor Pecoraro) have been dating since they were teenagers, but the differences between the two prevent them from staying together. Vicente (Ricardo Pereira) gave up his love for Lucena (Grazi Massafera) to commit himself to his studies. Vicente and Lucena manage to resume their romance, but Vicente ends up falling in love with Claudia. Rubinho and Lucena team up to prevent this new romance.

== Cast ==
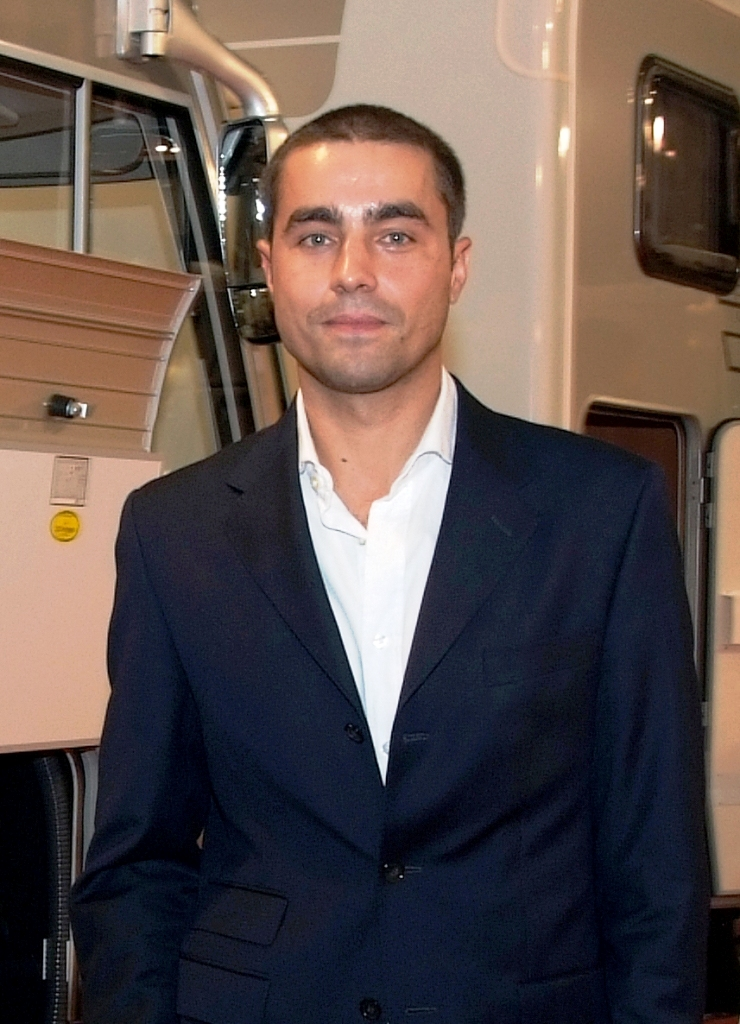
Ricardo Pereira portrays Vicente.

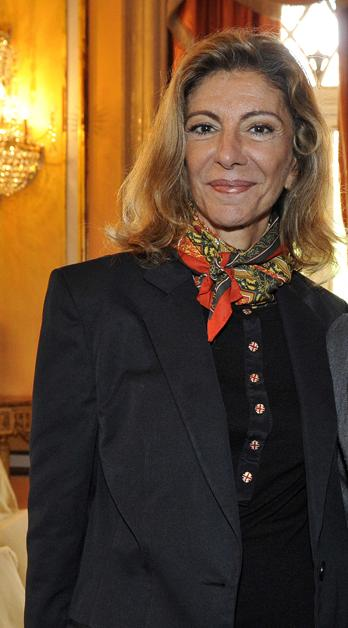
Marília Pêra portrays Maruschka.

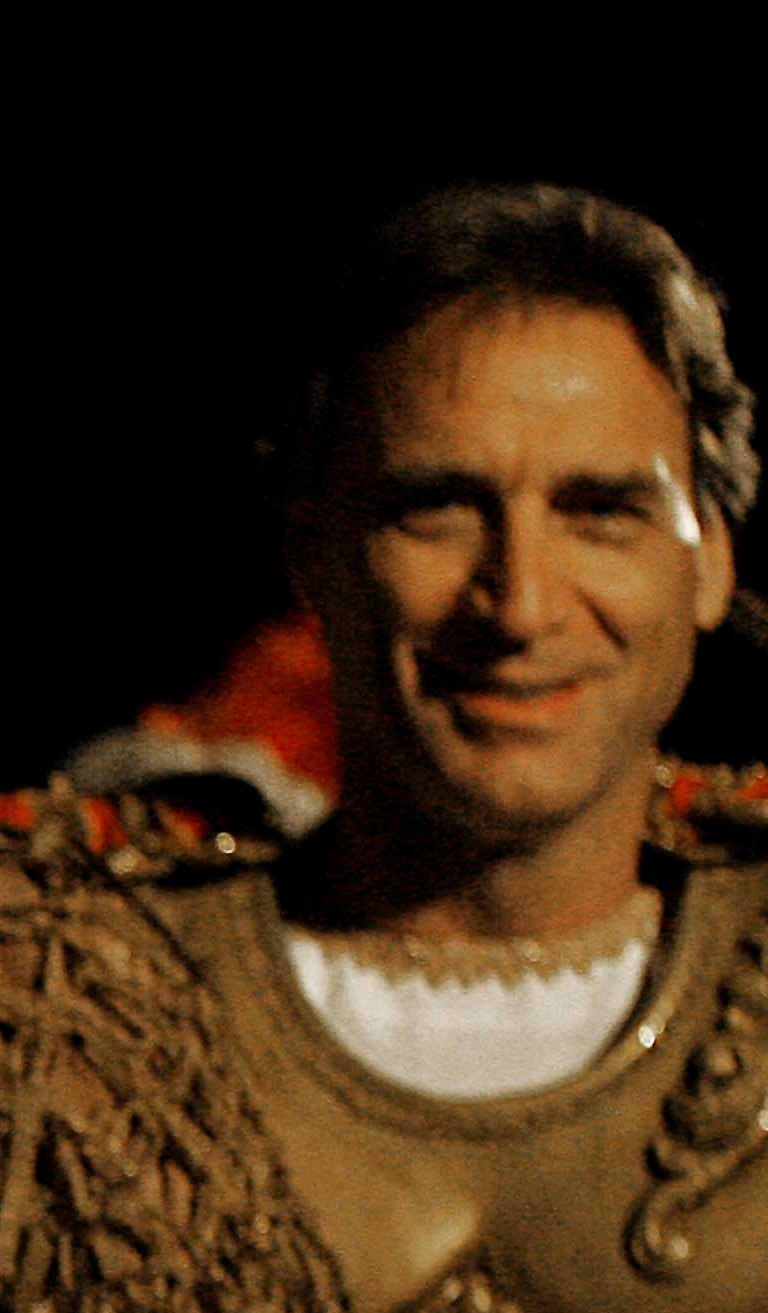
Herson Capri portrays Alberto.

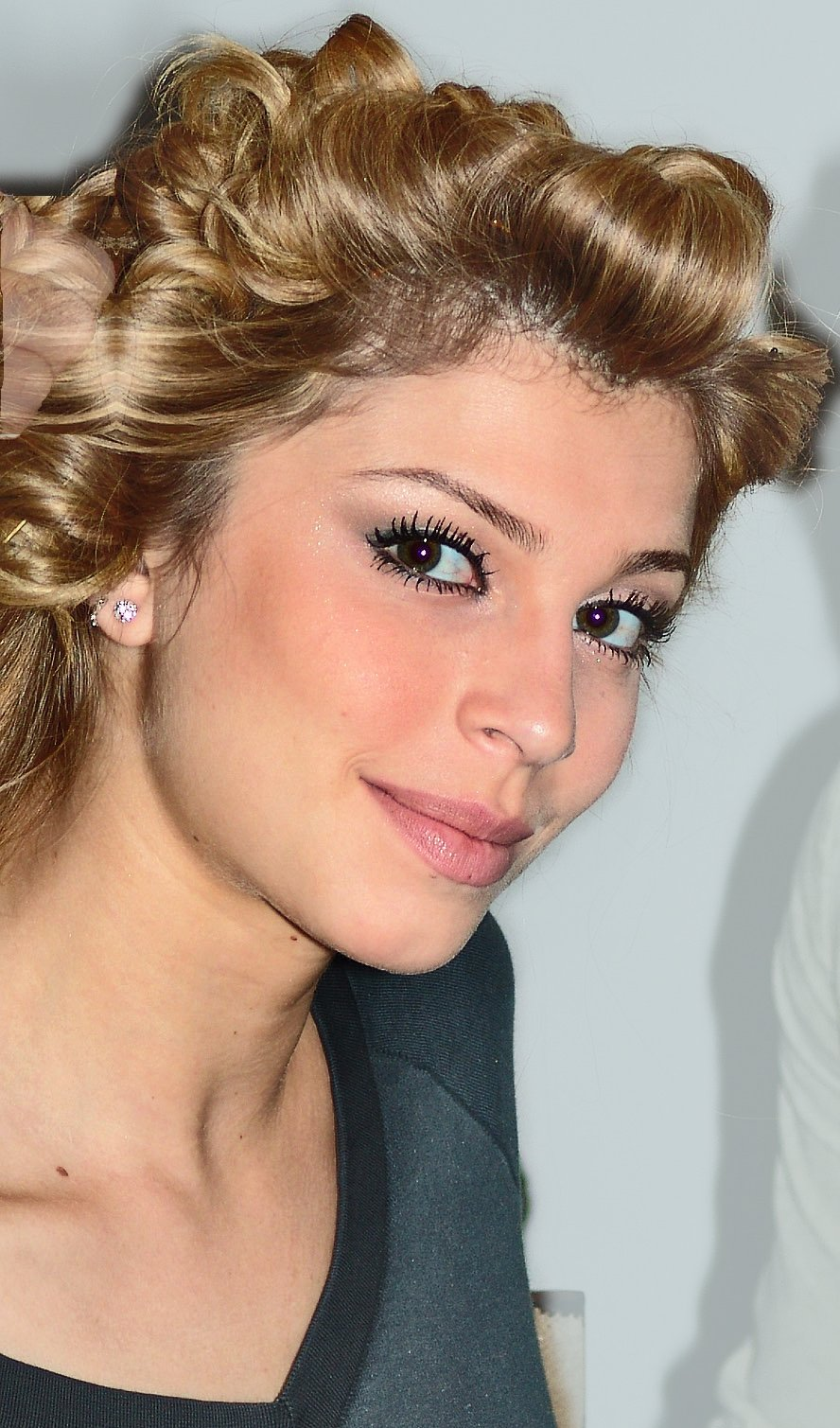
Grazi Massafera portrays Lucena.

- Giovanna Antonelli as Cláudia Collaboro
- Ricardo Pereira as Vicente Santelmo
- Marília Pêra as Maruschka Lemos de Sá
- Herson Capri as Alberto
- Victor Pecoraro as Rubinho Lemos de Sá
- Grazi Massafera as Lucena Zambelli
- Sheron Menezzes as Sarita
- Leilah Moreno as Grace Kelly
- Cláudia Jimenez as Mãe Iara
- Bruno Garcia as Joselito
- Diogo Vilela as Felizardo Barbosa
- Stella Miranda as Locanda Barbosa
- Bia Nunnes as Toinha/Damiana Barbosa
- Bruna Marquezine as Beleza "Belezinha" Falcão
- Fiuk as Agenor Barbosa
- Elizângela as Íntima Falcão
- Juliana Didone as Brigite
- Daniel Torres as Orlandinho
- Fernanda Souza as Camila Collaboro
- Frederico Reuter as Ricardo
- Luís Salém as Ana Girafa
- Jandir Ferrari as Raul
- Ângela Rebello as Vera
- Cynthia Falabella as Estela Jardim
- Edgar Bustamante as Ticiano
- Ernani Moraes as Olavo
- Frederico Volkmann as Tide
- Hugo Gross as Tibério
- Jacqueline Laurence as Mirta Lemos
- Jorge Maya as Cabo Rusty
- José D'Artagnan Júnior as Valério
- Karin Roepke as Alana
- Karina Marthin as Odessa
- Luciano Borges as Teleco
- Maria Eduarda as Cléo
- Maria Gladys as Eveva
- Mary Sheyla as Marisol
- Maria Maya as Raíssa Barbosa
- Maria Vieira as Brites Santelmo
- Maria Zilda Bethlem as Olga
- Mariah da Penha as Dalva
- Marina Motta as Amália Santelmo
- Nívea Maria as Regina
- Patrícia Bueno as Dona Otília
- Paula Frascari as Pilori
- Priscila Marinho as Taluda
- Raoni Carneiro as Sebastião Santelmo
- Renata Celidônio as Marieta
- Renata Ghelli as Jorgette
- Sandro Christopher as Bob Falcão
- Thereza Piffer as Gisele
- Thelma Reston as Violante
- Zezeh Barbosa as Deusa
