= Bruna Marquezine =

Brazilian actress and director (born 1995)

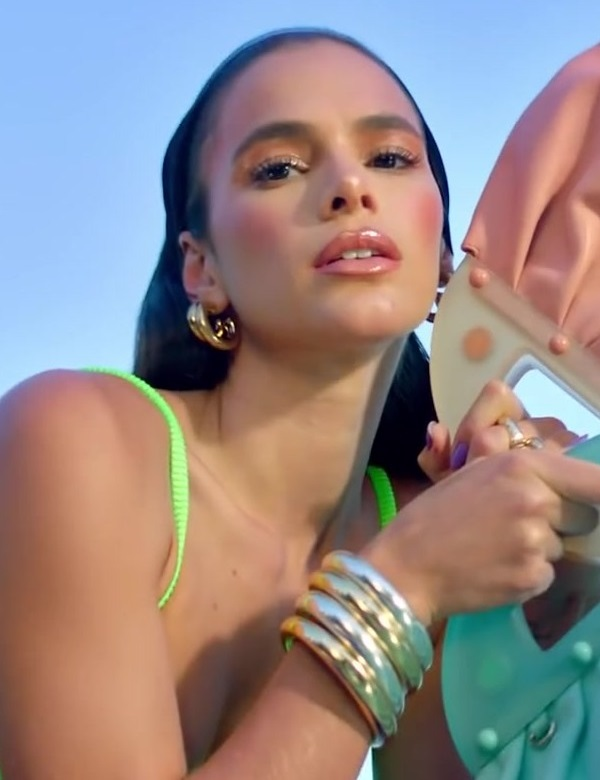
- Marquezine in 2021
- Born: Bruna Reis Maia; 4 August 1995 (age 31); Duque de Caxias, Rio de Janeiro, Brazil
- Citizenship: Brazil; Italy
- Occupations: Actress; filmmaker
- Years active: 2000–present
- Known for: Blue Beetle; Salve Jorge; Mulheres Apaixonadas; Xuxa Abracadabra
- Height: 170 cm (5 ft 7 in)
- Awards: Full list

Bruna Reis Maia (born 4 August 1995), known professionally as Bruna Marquezine (Brazilian Portuguese: [ˈbɾunɐ maʁkeˈzini]), is a Brazilian actress and filmmaker. She debuted on television in 2000 as one of the children interviewers for the children's program Gente Inocente. She has been part of the cast of several telenovelas. Throughout her career, she has been awarded the Troféu Imprensa, Contigo Award! 2004, and Young Brazilian Award, among others. She plays Jenny Kord, a love interest for Jaime Reyes (portrayed by Xolo Maridueña) in the DC Extended Universe film Blue Beetle (2023).

== Early life ==
Bruna Marquezine was born in Duque de Caxias in the Baixada Fluminense, suburb of Rio de Janeiro. Her birth name is Bruna Reis Maia, having adopted the surname Marquezine, spelled in Italian as Marchesini, as a tribute to her paternal grandmother of Italian descent. At the age of 9, she moved with her family, constituted by her father Telmo, a joiner, her mother Neide and little sister Luana, to Barra da Tijuca, Rio de Janeiro.

== Career ==
=== 2000–2011: Beginning of career and first works ===
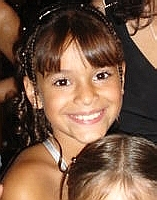
Bruna Marquezine in 2005

She began her television career in 2000 as one of the children interviewers for the children's program Gente Inocente, at the time, presented by Márcio Garcia. However, her first work as an actress had been in a commercial for the Military Police of São Paulo that talked about suicide and suicide prevention, when Bruna was still only five years old. This material reached Manoel Carlos and Ricardo Waddington, who later invited her to do a soap opera. Her debut in telenovelas came in 2003, in Mulheres Apaixonadas, by Manoel Carlos, where Bruna became nationally known for playing the character Salete. In the same year, she participated in the film Xuxa Abracadabra as the character Maria.

In 2005, the young actress joined the cast of the telenovela América playing the visually impaired character Maria Flor. The author of the plot Glória Perez, the actor Marcos Frota, who played the also disabled Jatobá, and Bruna Marquezine were honored with the Tiradentes Medal, in a session held in the plenary of the Legislative Assembly of Rio de Janeiro, at Tiradentes Palace. The highest award of the State was presented to the three for addressing the problems faced by the visually impaired in the telenovela América. The actress also acted in Cobras & Lagartos, in 2006, playing the character Lurdinha and Desejo Proibido, in 2007, playing Maria Augusta.

In 2008, she was promoted to the rank of teenage actress and gave life to her first protagonist, the martial arts fighter Flor de Lys in the soap opera Negócio da China. In 2010, she participated in the telenovela Araguaia, as the orphan Terezinha. In 2011, she joined the cast of Aquele Beijo, playing the co-protagonist Belezinha, a beauty queen.

=== 2012–2018: Adult and prominent characters ===
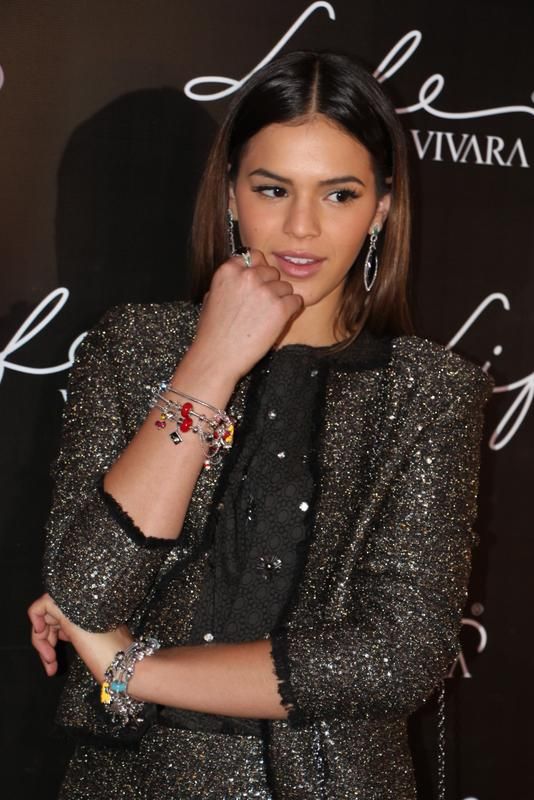
Bruna Marquezine in 2014

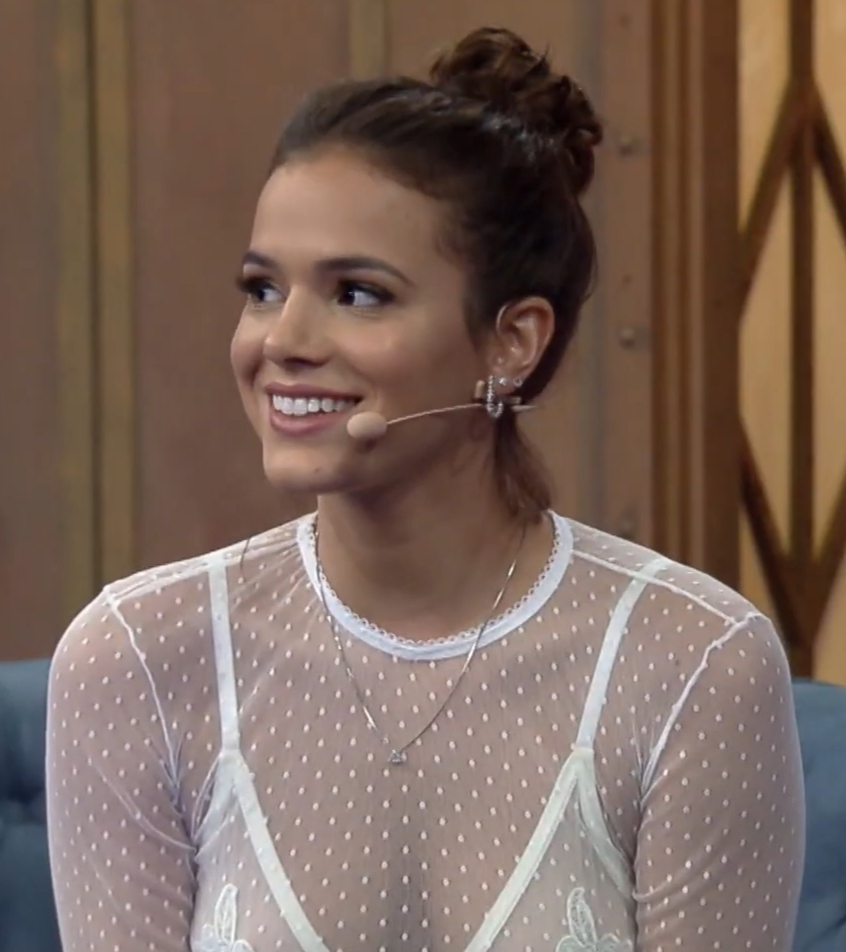
Bruna Marquezine in 2018

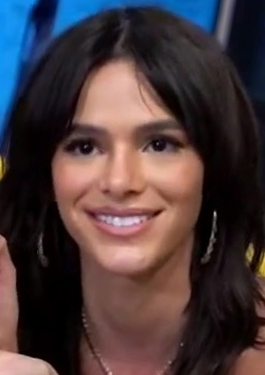
Bruna Marquezine in 2020

The first time I realized that I was a woman and that I was being objectified was when I was playing Lurdinha. [Several actresses] had the sensitivity to see [my fragility] and reach out.

— Bruna about being objectified in her first adult role in Salve Jorge (2012)

In 2012, Bruna Marquezine played the character Lurdinha in the soap opera Salve Jorge. According to the actress, at the same time she considered giving up her career because of the objectification of her body. What helped her change her mind was the support network she found in other TV Globo actresses, such as Cássia Kiss and Vanessa Gerbelli.

In 2014, she was invited by the author Manoel Carlos to play the traditional character Helena, in the second phase of the soap opera Em Família. In the third and main phase of the telenovela, she played Luiza, daughter of the protagonist Helena (now played by Júlia Lemmertz). In the same year, she is announced in the cast of I Love Paraisópolis, in which initially she was supposed to play an "attuned" resident of Paraisópolis, but later the direction of TV Globo, chose to change the role of Marquezine with that of Tatá Werneck, making Bruna the protagonist of the plot.

In 2016, she played the dancer and aspiring actress Beatriz dos Santos in the series Nada Será Como Antes, in which she starred in her first nude scenes on television. At the time, Marquezine called the character "the most challenging role of her career". In 2018, she was in the cast of the soap opera Deus Salve o Rei. A medieval-themed plot where the villain Catherine de Lurton lived for which the actress needed to lose five kilos for the composition of the character. Bruna's performance in this telenovela was criticized by the public, but despite this, she considered Catarina one of the most rewarding characters of her career. In September of the same year, Bruna was one of the highlights of the Dolce & Gabbana fashion show at Milan Fashion Week.

=== 2019–present: departure from Globo, fashion and other projects ===
In 2019, she debuted as a protagonist in the cinema in Vou Nadar até Você, a film by Klaus Mitteldorf that was screened at the 47th Gramado Film Festival where she gave life to the character Ophelia. Taking a break from television, she became a regular attendee of fashion shows such as New York Fashion Week, Milan Fashion Week and Paris Fashion Week. Soon after, she became the poster girl for the Miu Miu, Puma e Karl Lagerfeld brands and for the jewelry company H. Stern.

In January 2020, she did not have her contract renewed with TV Globo after 17 years, since the station was adopting a new model of contracting by work, keeping only a few names in the fixed cast, most of them veterans. In addition, she recorded an appearance in the series Conquest, produced by Keanu Reeves for Netflix. In September, she presented MTV Miaw with her friend Manu Gavassi, and shortly after, she announced a YouTube channel to share the backstage of her projects.

On November 23, 2020, Bruna Marquezine was announced by Netflix as the streaming service's new hire. The following week, the company announced that the actress would play the character Liz in the series Maldivas alongside artists such as Manu Gavassi, Sheron Menezzes, Klebber Toledo, among others.

In November 2021, Bruna Marquezine auditioned to play Supergirl in the DC Extended Universe film The Flash and ended in second place. The pandemic of COVID-19 was one of the factors for the non-approval, since she couldn't travel to participate in the final stage. On March 8, 2022, she was officially announced as Jenny Kord in the DC movie Blue Beetle, her first international role as an actress. Bruna Marquezine has said that despite not passing the tests for Supergirl, it put her on Warner Bros.' radar for new roles.

Bruna Marquezine signed with United Talent Agency for representation in April 2023.

== Personal life ==
In 2018, Marquezine became a member of the Evangelical Church of Mananciais in Rio de Janeiro. The same year, she revealed that she had suffered from image disorders, depression and self-esteem problems in the past. The problems were fueled by online comments about her body.

In 2019, Marquezine bought a mansion in Barra da Tijuca.

From 2013 to 2017, Marquezine was in a relationship with Brazilian professional footballer Neymar. In August 2024, actor, singer and digital influencer João Guilherme, confirmed that he was in a relationship with Marquezine. Since late 2025, she has been in a relationship with Canadian singer Shawn Mendes.

== Filmography ==
Film
Year	Title	Role	Note(s)
2003	Xuxa Abracadabra	Maria	
2004	Xuxa e o Tesouro da Cidade Perdida	Manhã	
2005	Mais Uma Vez Amor	Mariana (Mari)	
2009	O Mistério de Feiurinha	Belezinha	
2009	Flordelis: Basta uma Palavra para Mudar	Rayane	
2013	Xphobia	Samantha	Dubbing
2015	Breaking Through	Roseli	
2019	Vou Nadar Até Você	Ophelia	
2023	Blue Beetle	Jenny Kord	
2026	Velhos Bandidos	Nancy	

Television
Year	Title	Role	Note(s)
2000–2002	Gente Inocente	Interviewer	Segment: Tá no Papo
2002	Sítio do Picapau Amarelo	Broken Wing Angel	Episode: "Caçadas do Barão"
2003	Mulheres Apaixonadas	Salete Machado	
2003	Siga Aquela Estrela	Bruninha	End of year special
2004	Sítio do Picapau Amarelo	Jajale/Marina	Episode: "A Menina da Selva"
2004	A Diarista	Bruninha	Episode: "Quem vai Ficar com a Marinete?"
2005	América	Maria Flor	
2006	Cobras & Lagartos	Lurdes "Lurdinha" Padilha	
2007	Amazônia	Andressa de Sousa Pinheiro	
2007	Carga Pesada	Aline	Episode: "Marcas Profundas"
2007	Desejo Proibido	Maria Augusta "Magú" Mendonça	
2008	Negócio da China	Flor de Lys Silvestre	
2010	Araguaia	Terezinha de Jesus	
2011	Aquele Beijo	Beleza Maria Falcão "Belezinha"	
2012	Salve Jorge	Lurdes Maria de Sousa Mendonça "Lurdinha"	
2013	Dança dos Famosos	Competitor	Season 10
2014	Em Família	Helena Fernandes	Episode: "3 de fevereiro"
2014	Em Família	Luiza Fernandes Machado	
2015	I Love Paraisópolis	Marizete "Mari" da Silva Antunes	
2016	Nada Será Como Antes	Beatriz dos Santos	
2018	Deus Salve o Rei	Catarina of Lurton, Princess of Artena	
2020	MTV Millennial Awards	Host	
2022	Maldivas	Liz Lobato	
2024	Benefits with Friends	Bianca "Bia" Martins	
2026	Véspera	Veneza	

=== Music video ===
Year	Title	Artist
2002	Xuxa Só Para Baixinhos 3	Xuxa Meneghel
2004	Xuxa Só Para Baixinhos 5	Xuxa Meneghel
2015	"Amei Te Ver"	Tiago Iorc

== Theatre ==
Year	Title
2003	Cosquinha

== Awards and nominations ==
Year	Awards	Category	Nominated work	Result
2003	Melhores do Ano	Best Child Actor and Actress	Salete in Mulheres Apaixonadas	Won
2003	Extra de Televisão	Best Child Actor or Actress	Salete in Mulheres Apaixonadas	Nominated
2003	Prêmio Qualidade Brasil - Rio de Janeiro	Best Female Revelation	Salete in Mulheres Apaixonadas	Won
2003	Troféu Leão de Ouro	Most Promising Actor	Salete in Mulheres Apaixonadas	Won
2003	Troféu Imprensa	Revelação do Ano	Salete in Mulheres Apaixonadas	Won
2005	Maria Clara de Teatro Awards	Best Child Actress	Maria Flor in América	Won
2005	Prêmio Conta Mais	Best Child Actress	Maria Flor in América	Won
2005	ABL Awards	Best Child Actress	Maria Flor in América	Won
2005	Medalha Tiradentes	Best Child Actress	Maria Flor in América	Won
2008	Flor in Negócio da China	Best Child Actress		Won
2012	Noveleiros Awards	The Prettiest	Lurdinha in Salve Jorge	Nominated
2013	Extra de Televisão Awards	Teen Idol	Lurdinha in Salve Jorge	Nominated
2014	Retrospectiva UOL	Best Actress	Luiza in Em Família	Nominated
2014	F5 Awards	Girl of the Year	Bruna Marquezine	Nominated
2014	Site EGO	Personality of the Year	Bruna Marquezine	Nominated
2020	Meus Prêmios Nick	Inspiration of the Year	Herself	Nominated
2020	F5 Award	Sexiest Woman	Herself	Nominated
2020	Capricho Awards	Best Friends	She and Manu Gavassi	Nominated
2020	TodaTeen Award	Friendship of the Year	She and Sasha Meneghel	Nominated
2021	Sesc Best Films Festival	Best National Actress	Vou Nadar Até Você	Nominated
2021	iBest Award	Influencer of the Year - Rio de Janeiro	Herself	Nominated
2021	iBest Award	Instagrammer of the Year	Herself	Nominated
2021	Meus Prêmios Nick	Instapet	Mia	Nominated
2021	MTV Millennial Awards	Style of the year	Herself	Nominated
