= Mara Manzan =

Brazilian actress (1952–2009)

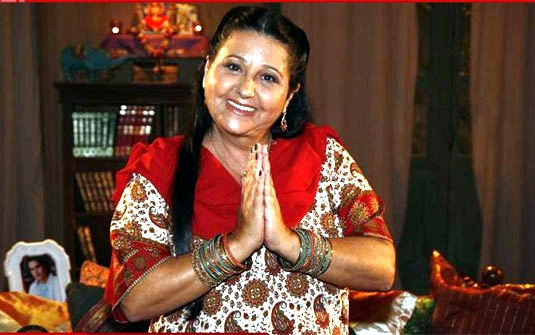
- A photograph of Mara Manzan
- Born: Mara Virgínia Manzan; 28 May 1952; São Paulo, SP, Brazil
- Died: 13 November 2009 (aged 57); Rio de Janeiro, RJ, Brazil
- Occupation: Actress
- Years active: 1978–2009

Mara Virgínia Manzan (28 May 1952 – 13 November 2009) was a Brazilian actress.

== Biography ==
Manzan was born in the city of São Paulo in 1952. At the age of 17, she visited the Teatro Oficina and, as she used to say jokingly, never left it. She worked backstage in all sorts of activities, until one day the opportunity arose to replace a sick actress in a play. In the 1970s she married José Marcondes Marques and they had a daughter, Tatiana Manzan Marques, also an actress.

In March 2008, acting as "Amara" in Duas Caras, she learned that she had lung cancer. By that time she already had two-thirds of her lungs affected by a pulmonary emphysema (she was a smoker). Manzan was treated surgically by Dr. Drauzio Varella the following month on 16 April 2008. She had already reportedly undergone a radical hysterectomy due to cancers of the uterus and ovaries.

== Death ==
Manzan died on 13 November 2009 at the Rios d'Or Hospital of pulmonary failure of a lung cancer that had afflicted her for more than two years.

== Filmography ==
=== Film career ===
- 1982: Bonecas da Noite
- 2000: De Cara Limpa .... Suzy
- 2003: Herman .... Herself
- 2007: Sambando nas Brasas, Morô? .... Dona Nair
- 2008: Sexo com Amor? .... Dirce

=== Television career ===
- 1994: A Viagem .... Edmeia
- 1996: Salsa e Merengue .... Sexta-feira
- 1998: Hilda Furacão .... Nevita
- 1998: Pecado Capital .... Alzira
- 1998: Você Decide .... Marly
- 1999: Ô Coitado .... Cráudia
- 1999: Terra Nostra .... seamstress dress Giuliana
- 2001: O Clone .... Odete
- 2003: Kubanacan .... Agatha
- 2003: Sítio do Picapau Amarelo .... Tetéia
- 2004: Da Cor do Pecado .... Father Helinho's client
- 2004: Senhora do Destino .... Janice
- 2005: América .... Creuza's mother
- 2006: Cobras & Lagartos .... Marilene
- 2007: Duas Caras .... Amara
- 2009: Caminho das Índias .... Dona Ashima (final appearance)
