= Causa e Efeito =

2014 Brazilian drama film

- Brazilian theatrical poster
- Directed by: André Marouço
- Starring: Matheus Prestes; Naruna Costa; Luiz Serra; Rosi Campos; Henri Pagnoncelli
- Production companies: Estação Luz Filmes; Mar Revolto Produções
- Distributed by: Paris Filmes; Downtown Filmes
- Release date: 3 July 2014
- Country: Brazil
- Language: Portuguese

Causa e Efeito (Lit: Cause and Effect) is a 2014 Brazilian drama film directed by André Marouço, and starring Matheus Prestes, Naruna Costa, Luiz Serra, Rosi Campos and Henri Pagnoncelli.

The plot of the film, inspired by the teachings of Allan Kardec, shows the life of officer Paulo, who loses his wife and son in an accident. Not satisfied with the fact that the killer has not been caught, he decides to take the law into his own hands. On the way, he meets a girl, who he falls in love with. Both receive the advice of a priest, a minister and a spiritualist, and realize that they are suffering the consequences of a case that occurred in past lives.

== Cast ==
- Matheus Prestes as Paulo
- Naruna Costa
- Luiz Serra as Spiritualist
- Rosi Campos as Medium
- Henri Pagnoncelli as Gustavo
