= Luís Melo =

Brazilian actor (born 1957)

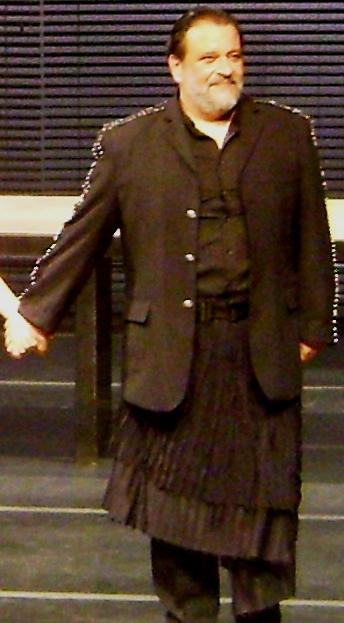
- Born: November 13, 1957 (age 68); Curitiba, Paraná, Brazil
- Occupation: Actor

Luís Melo (born November 13, 1957, in Curitiba) is a Brazilian actor.

== Filmography ==
=== Television ===
- 1985 Cata-Vento - Gororóba
- 1995 Cara & Coroa - Rubinho
- 1997 Anjo Mau - Müller
- 1997 O Amor Está no Ar - Alberto
- 1998 Pecado Capital - Ricardo
- 1998 Hilda Furacão - Padre Ciro
- 1999 Suave Veneno - Ramalho
- 1999 O Auto da Compadecida - The Devil
- 2000 O Cravo e a Rosa - Nicanor Batista
- 2000 A Invenção do Brasil - Vasco de Athaíde
- 2000 A Muralha - Manuel
- 2001 A Padroeira - Molina
- 2003 A Casa das Sete Mulheres - Bento Manuel
- 2004 Um Só Coração - Cândido Portinari
- 2005 América - Ramiro
- 2006 Cobras & Lagartos - Orã Munhoz/Conchita
- 2006 JK - Coronel Licurgo
- 2007 Eterna Magia - Dr. Rafael (Tio Rafa)
- 2008 Faça Sua História - Delegado Nicanor
- 2008 Casos e Acasos - Linhares
- 2009 Cinquentinha - Joaquim Coutinho
- 2010 A Princesa e o Vagabundo - Conde Graco de Lafayette
- 2010 A Vida Alheia - Delano Silva
- 2010 Na Forma da Lei - João Carlos Viegas
- 2011 Chico Xavier - João Cândido
- 2011 Morde & Assopra - Oséas
- 2012 Amor Eterno Amor - Dimas
- 2013 Amor a vida - Atilio
- 2016 Sol Nascente - Tanaka
- 2017 Sob Pressão - José Luiz Almeida
- 2025 Vale Tudo - Bartolomeu Meirelles

=== Cinema ===
- Encarnação do Demônio
- Cafundó
- Gaijin - Ama-me Como Sou
- Separações
- Olga
- Caramuru - A Invenção do Brasil
- Por Trás do Pano
- O Auto da Compadecida
- Terra Estrangeira
- Doces Poderes
- Jenipapo
- Chico Xavier

=== Theater ===
- Macunaíma (Mário de Andrade)
- A Hora e a Vez De Augusto Matraga (Guimarães Rosa)
- Xica da Silva, (Luis Alberto de Abreu)
- Paraíso Zona Norte (Nélson Rodrigues)
- Nova Velha História (do mito Chapeuzinho Vermelho)
- Trono de Sangue / MacBeth (William Shakespeare)
- Vereda da Salvação (Jorge de Andrade)
- Gilgamesh (baseado no poema épico sumério)
- Sonata Kreutzer (baseado em conto de Tolstoi)
- Salomé (Oscar Wilde)
- Cão Coisa e a Coisa Homem
- Daqui a 200 Anos
