= Wolf Maya =

Brazilian actor and director

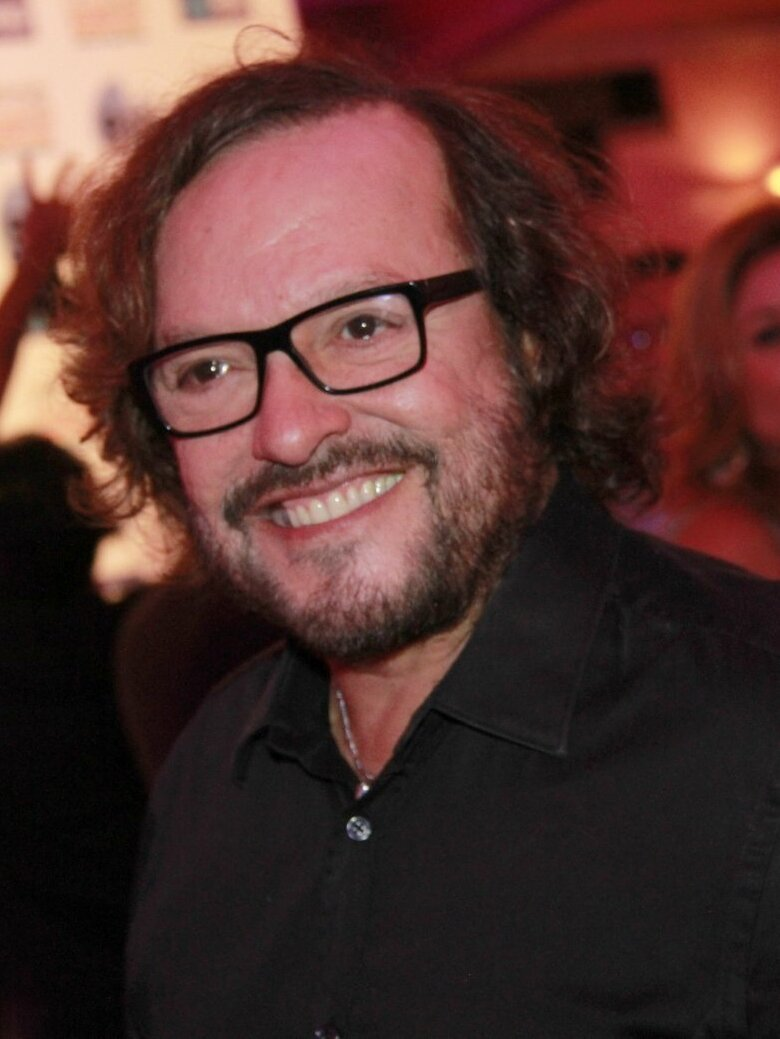
- Born: Walfredo Campos Maya Júnior; 10 September 1953 (age 72); Goiânia, Goiás, Brazil
- Occupations: Actor, director
- Years active: 1979–present
- Spouse(s): Cininha de Paula; Vânia de Brito
- Children: 2, including Maria

Walfredo Campos Maya Júnior (born 10 September 1953), better known as Wolf Maya, is a Brazilian actor and director. Starting in the 1980s, he directed and acted in various telenovelas, including Hilda Furacão, Louco Amor, Malhação, and Salsa e Merengue.

== Biography ==
Maya was born on 10 September 1953 in Goiânia. He studied interpretation at the O Tablado school and at the National Conservatory in Rio de Janeiro. He also graduated in musical theatre as part of the Carnegie Hall Ballet in New York City. He began his acting in the 1980s by presenting for various specials, telenovelas, and miniseries. He simultaneously also began his career as a director at this time, staging musical performances throughout Brazil. He currently directs telenovelas, miniseries, films, theatre, and musicals.

He is the father to two daughters: actress Maria Maya from his marriage to actress and director Cininha de Paula, and Manu Maya from his marriage to producer Vânia de Brito. Maya is the uncle of actress Thaís de Campos.

In 2001, he founded the Escola de Atores Wolf Maya in São Paulo, and established a branch in Rio de Janeiro in 2013.

In 2016, Maya he inaugurated the Teatro Nathalia Timberg in Rio de Janeiro, paying tribute to the actress.

In 2016, he was let go from Rede Globo after working there for 35 years. In 2019, he was hired by the Portuguese broadcaster TVI to direct the novela Na Corda Bamba by Rui Vilhena. He was fired, however, after criticizing Vilhena for being “precarious” and “very late”.

== Filmography ==
=== As actor ===
Television
Year	Title	Role	Note
1979	Memórias de Amor	Rebelo	
1982	Final Feliz	Delegado Paixão	
1990	Barriga de Aluguel	Paulo César	
1993	Mulheres de Areia	Dr. Otacílio Galvão	Special participation
1995	Cara e Coroa	Cícero	
1997	O Amor Está no Ar	Victor Sousa Carvalho Uchôa	
2000	Uga Uga	Felipe Prado	
2003	Kubanacan	Don Diego	
2004	Senhora do Destino	Leonardo de Andrade e Couto	
2007	Duas Caras	Geraldo Peixeiro	
2010	Na Forma da Lei	Deputado Simões	
2011	Lara com Z	Himself	
2011	Fina Estampa	Álvaro Siqueira Maciel	
2013	Amor à Vida	Himself	
2022	Pacto Brutal - O Assassinato de Daniella Perez	Himself	

== As director ==
TV Director
Ano	Titulo
1981	Ciranda de Pedra
1982	Elas por Elas
1982	Final Feliz
1983	Louco Amor
1983	Champagne
1984	Livre Para Voar
1985	Ti Ti Ti
1986	Hipertensão
1987	Bambolê
1990	Desejo (minissérie)
1990	Barriga de Aluguel
1993	Mulheres de Areia
1994	A Viagem
1995	Cara & Coroa
1996	Malhação
1996	Salsa e Merengue
1997	O Amor Está No Ar
1998	Hilda Furacão
1998	Pecado Capital
2000	Esplendor
2000	Uga-Uga
2002	O Quinto dos Infernos
2003	Kubanacan
2004	Senhora do Destino
2006	Cobras & Lagartos
2007	Duas Caras
2008	Sexo com Amor?
2008	Xuxa e as Noviças
2009	Cinquentinha
2009-2012	Criança Esperança
2010	Na Forma da Lei
2011	Lara com Z
2011	Fina Estampa
2013	Amor à Vida
2014	Segunda Dama
2015	I Love Paraisópolis

== Theatre ==
Year	Title
2016	33 Variações de Beethoven
