= Hilda Furacão =

1998 Brazilian miniseries by Glória Perez

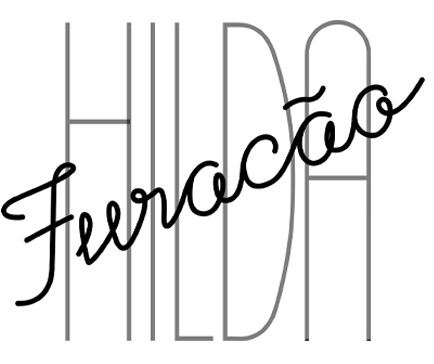
- Genre: Period Drama; Romance; Political Fiction
- Created by: Roberto Drummond
- Written by: Glória Perez
- Directed by: Wolf Maya
- Starring: Ana Paula Arósio; Rodrigo Santoro
- Country of origin: Brazil
- Original language: Portuguese
- No. of episodes: 32

Original release
- Network: TV Globo
- Release: 17 May – 23 July 1998

Hilda Furacão (Portuguese pronunciation: [ˈiwdɐ fuɾaˈkɐ̃w̃]; English: Hilda Hurricane) is a Brazilian miniseries produced by TV Globo which originally aired from May 27 to July 23 of 1998, with a total of 32 episodes. The miniseries took the time slot of Dona Flor e Seus Dois Maridos (English: Dona Flor and Her Two Husbands) and was followed by Labirinto (English: Labyrinth). It was written by Glória Perez and directed by Wolf Maya, Maurício Farias, and Luciano Sabino.

The miniseries was based on Roberto Drummond's book by the same name, which was in turn based on the life of a prostitute, Hilda Maia Valentim, known in the red light district of Belo Horizonte as Hilda Furacão.

The cast includes Ana Paula Arósio, Rodrigo Santoro, Danton Mello, Eva Todor, Paulo Autran, Thiago Lacerda, Tarcísio Meira, and Rogério Cardoso.

== Plot ==
The most sought-after prostitute in the Belo Horizonte, Minas Gerais, brothels during the '50s and '60s, Hilda Müller (Ana Paula Arósio) was the daughter of a highly respected middle-class family. She scandalized society by breaking away from her family and shattering taboos, fleeing on her wedding day and seeking refuge in a brothel and adopting the alias Hilda Furacão. The miniseries contrasts antagonistic contexts (religiosity and profligacy; revolution and counter-revolution), as well as protagonist characters (Hilda Furacão and Frei Malthus (Rodrigo Santoro)). The series ends during the '60s, after the 1964 Brazilian coup d'etat.

== Cast ==
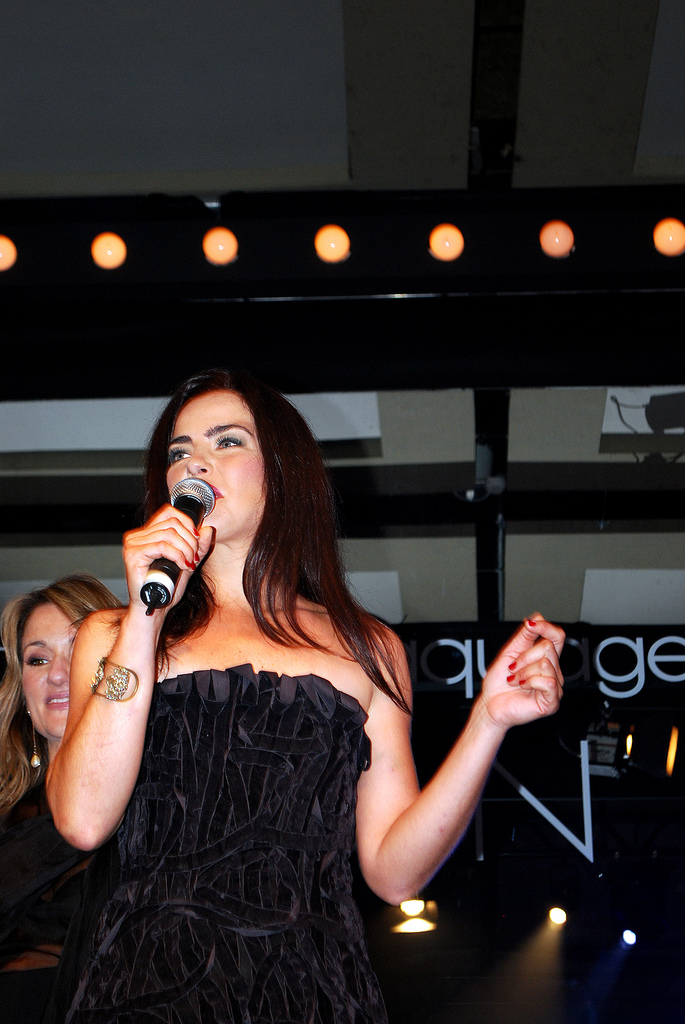
Ana Paula Arósio plays the protagonist, Hilda.

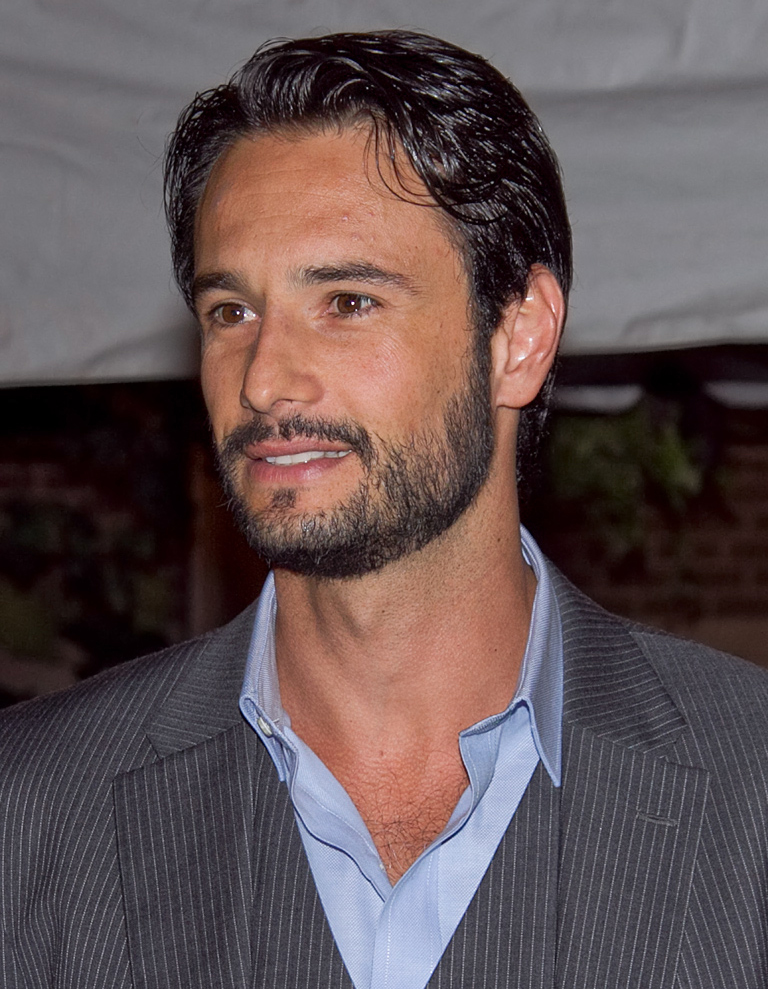
Rodrigo Santoro plays Frei Malthus.

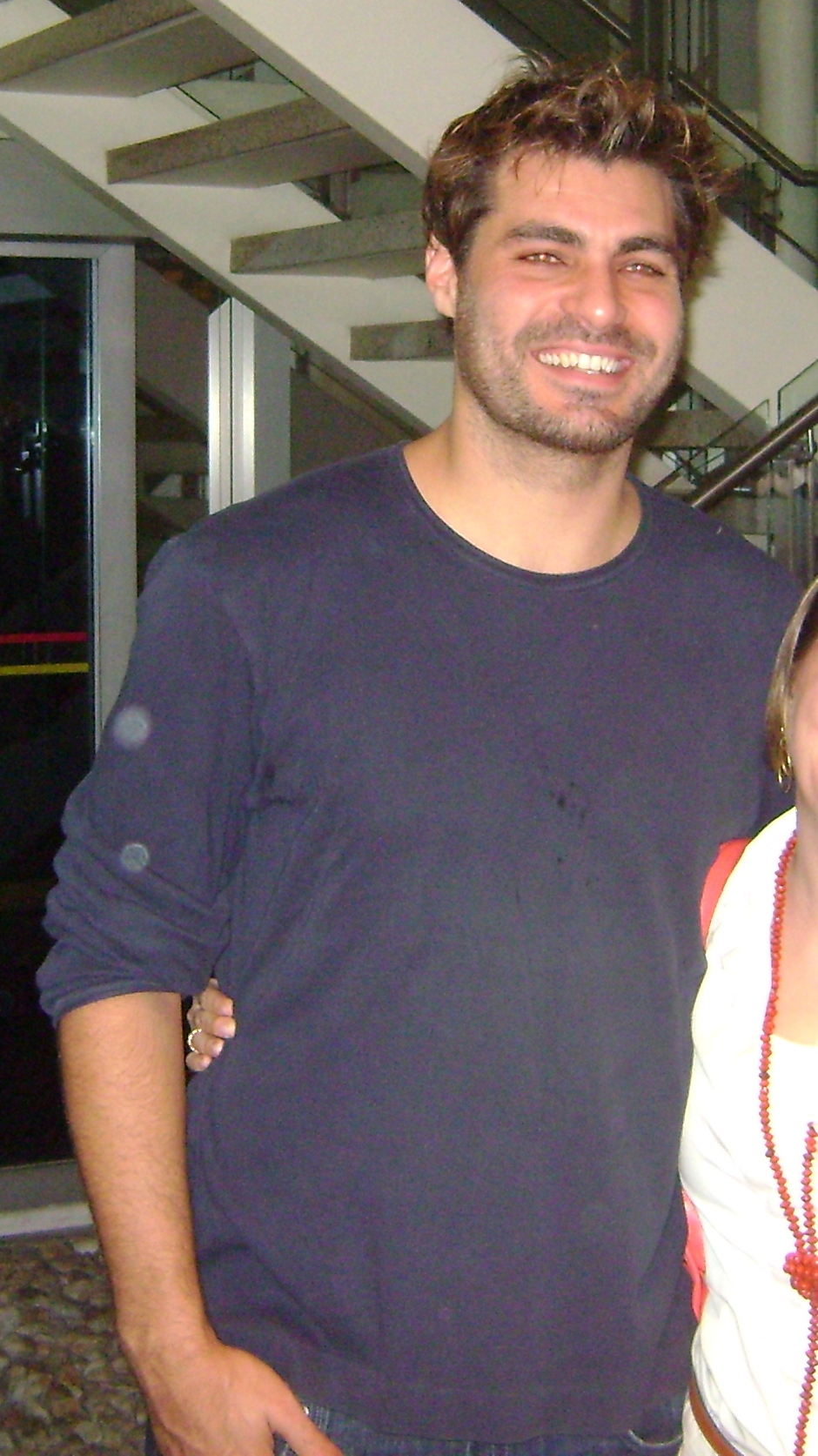
Thiago Lacerda plays aspiring actor Aramel.

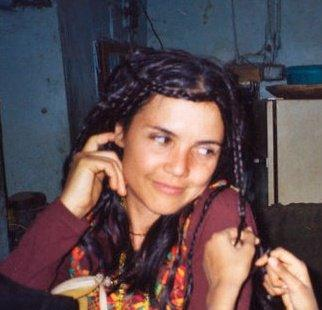
Tereza Seiblitz plays Gabriela.

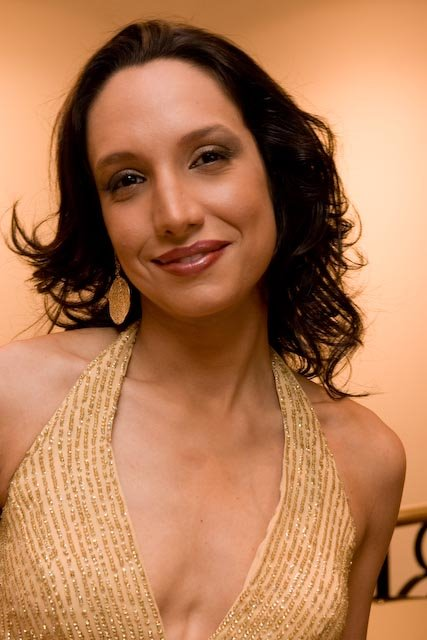
Maria Maya plays the communist Zora.

Actor	Character
Ana Paula Arósio	Hilda Furacão (Hilda Gualtieri Müller)
Rodrigo Santoro	Malthus Librelato (Frei Malthus)
Danton Mello	Roberto Drummond
Thiago Lacerda	Aramel
Rosi Campos	Maria Tomba-Homem
Débora Duarte	Sãozinha (Conceição Drummond)
Eva Todor	Loló Ventura
Carlos Vereza	Lorca
Arlete Salles	Madame Janete
Paulo Autran	Padre Nelson
Mário Lago	Olavo
Tarcísio Meira	Coronel Pocidônio
Stênio Garcia	Tonico Mendes
Tereza Seiblitz	Gabriela M
Zezé Polessa	Neném
Walderez de Barros	Ciana (Emerenciana Drummond)
Paloma Duarte	Leonor
Cláudia Alencar	Divinéia
Matheus Nachtergaele	Cintura Fina
Marcos Frota	Padre Geraldo
Cláudio Corrêa e Castro	Mauro Garber
Eloísa Mafalda	Clotilde
Jackson Antunes	Inspetor Eduardo
José Lewgoy	Tenente Benedito
Otávio Müller	Delegado Bernardo
Paulo Betti	Delegado Renciso
Eliane Giardini	Berta
Luís Melo	Padre Ciro
Rogério Cardoso	Ventura
Tatiana Issa	Dorinha
Roberto Bonfim	Coronel Filogônio Flores
Maria Maya	Zora
Cininha de Paula	Lucianara
Carolina Kasting	Bela B
Sérgio Loroza	M.C.
Chico Diaz	Orlando Bonfim
Marcos Oliveira	Zé Viana
Anselmo Vasconcellos	Jabuti
Guilherme Karan	João Dindim
Carlos Gregório	Alencastro
Walther Verve	Alves
Daniel Boaventura	Zico
Ricardo Blat	Cidinho
Henri Pagnocelli	Müller
Mara Manzan	Nevita
Ivan Cândido	Delegado Procópio
Pedro Brício	Juca
Suzana Gonçalves	Yara Tupinambá
Caio Junqueira	Demétrio
Dary Reis	Nilson Sargento
Iara Jamra	Beata Fininha
Marilena Cury	Alição
Yachmin Gazal	Alicinha
Elaine Mickely	Rosa
Luís Cláudio Jr.	Dudu
Pedro Salomão Perrini Sakhabuth	Frei Malthus (child)

== Production ==
The mission of adapting the book Hilda Furacão for TV was given to Glória Perez by Mário Lúcio Vaz, then director of Central Globo de Produções. Perez ended up busying herself with other work, and Hilda's concept went through several potential authors until she returned to the project in 1997. To portray the 60s, Perez spoke with activists of the time, including Mário Lago (also a member of the cast) and Apolônio de Carvalho.

Ana Paulo Arósio, then hired by rival network SBT, was specially assigned by Globo for the miniseries. The idea for the casting came from director Wolf Maya.

Scenes which took place in the fictional Santana dos Ferros were recorded in Tiradentes, where the production temporarily closed streets and altered facades. The Hotel Glória, in the city of Rio de Janeiro, passed as the Minas Tênis Clube, and the Niterói City Council served as the Belo Horizonte City Council.

== Internet virality ==
The series went viral on the internet in November 2023, when scenes featuring the titular protagonist (Ana Paula Arósio) and her love interest Frei Malthus (Rodrigo Santoro) began to circulate on social media, primarily as TikTok clips, giving rise to various memes by Anglophone audiences. One catalyst may have been that the series received an English fan translation a month prior on October 2023.
