= Esplendor =

2003 Brazilian telenovela

- Genre: Telenovela
- Created by: Ana Maria Moretzsohn
- Written by: Glória Barreto; Daisy Chaves; Izabel de Oliveira
- Directed by: Wolf Maya
- Starring: Letícia Spiller; Floriano Peixoto; Murilo Benício; Caio Blat; Christine Fernandes; Cássia Kis; Gracindo Júnior; Joana Fomm
- Opening theme: "Que Não Se Vê (Come Tu Mi Vuoi)" by Caetano Veloso
- Country of origin: Brazil
- Original language: Portuguese
- No. of episodes: 125

Production
- Camera setup: Multi-camera

Original release
- Network: Rede Globo
- Release: 31 January – 24 June 2000

Esplendor is a Brazilian telenovela produced and broadcast by Rede Globo. It premiered on 31 January 2000, replacing Força de um Desejo, and ended on 24 June 2000, replaced by O Cravo e a Rosa. The telenovela is written by Ana Maria Moretzsohn, with the collaboration of Glória Barreto, Daisy Chaves, and Izabel de Oliveira.

It stars Letícia Spiller, Floriano Peixoto, Murilo Benício, Caio Blat, Christine Fernandes, Cássia Kis, Gracindo Júnior, and Joana Fomm.

== Cast ==
- Letícia Spiller as Flávia Cristina Sampaio
- Floriano Peixoto as Frederico Berger
- Murilo Benício as Cristóvão Rocha
- Cássia Kis as Adelaide Berger
- Joana Fomm as Olga Faria Norman
- Gracindo Júnior as Hugo Norman
- Caio Blat as Bruno Sampaio
- Christine Fernandes as Flávia Regina Pereira
- Caco Ciocler as Lázaro Povoa
- Tônia Carrero as Mimi Melody
- Ítalo Rossi as Vicente Almeida
- Ângela Figueiredo as Elisa Berguer
- Zezé Motta as Irene da Silva
- Osmar Prado as Rodolfo Bernardes
- Cláudia Alencar as Laura Bernardes
- Thiago de Los Reyes as Guilherme "Gui" Berger
- Max Fercondini as Frederico "Freddy" Berger Junior
- Juliana Knust as Helena Bernardes
- Adriana Garambone as Marisa Faria Norman
- Marcos Palmeira as Francisco Hodges
- Lucinha Lins as Lígia Mallet
- Guilherme Piva as Marcelo Neves
- Luiz Guilherme as Augusto Silveira
- Guga Coelho as Luciano "Caçula"
- Marcelo Saback as Mariano Rodrigues
- Karine Carvalho as Suzy Mallet
- Anselmo Vasconcelos as Antônio Rajão
- Thaís Fersoza as Érica Berger
- Henri Castelli as Dino Ferreira
- Edward Boggis as Otávio Guerreiro
- Ângela Rebello as Gertrudes Santos
- Chico Tenreiro as Ivo Martins
- Bijú Martins as Sandro da Silva
- Daniele Guerreiro as Nina Rodrigues
- Elísio Lage as Cássio Arantes
- Luiz Cláudio Júnior as Pablo Bernardes

=== Guest stars ===
- Marcelo Serrado as David Martins
- Flávio Galvão as Arnaldo Ferreira
- Rosaly Papadopol as Mariota
