= Caco Ciocler =

Brazilian television and film actor

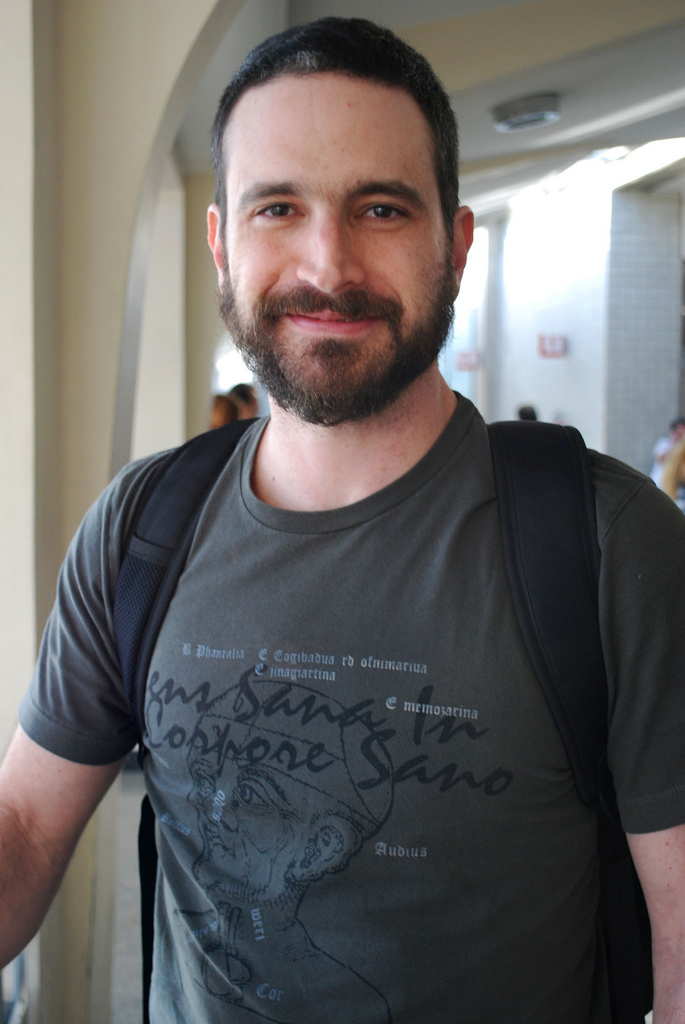
- Ciocler in 2009
- Born: Carlos Alberto Ciocler; 27 September 1971 (age 54); São Paulo, Brazil
- Education: University of São Paulo
- Occupation: Actor
- Years active: 1995–present
- Spouses: Lavínia Lorenzon (divorced) Marina Previato (divorced)
- Children: 1

Carlos Alberto "Caco" Ciocler (born 27 September 1971) is a Brazilian actor and director.

== Filmography ==
=== Television ===
Television roles
| Year | Title | Role | Notes |
|---|---|---|---|
| 1995 | A Próxima Vítima | Daniel | Episode: "March 16" |
| 1996 | O Rei do Gado | Geremias Berdinazzi | |
| 1996 | Você Decide | Lucas | Episode: "Berço de Sangue" |
| 1997 | O Amor Está no Ar | Davi | |
| 1998 | Por Amor | Flavinho | Episodes: "April 27–May 22" |
| 1998 | Você Decide | Tadeu | Episode: "Um Lar Para Clarice" |
| 1998 | Você Decide | Evandro | Episode: "Vida" |
| 1998 | Você Decide | Diogo | Episode: "Verdades e Mentiras" |
| 1998 | Corpo Dourado | Padre Estevão | |
| 2000 | A Muralha | Bento Coutinho | |
| 2000 | Esplendor | Lázaro | |
| 2001 | Um Anjo Caiu do Céu | David Esteves | |
| 2002 | O Quinto dos Infernos | Dom Miguel I de Portugal | |
| 2003 | Chocolate com Pimenta | Miguel do Canto e Melo | |
| 2005 | América | Edward Talbot (Ed) | |
| 2006 | JK | Leonardo Faria | |
| 2006 | Páginas da Vida | Renato Martins | |
| 2007 | Duas Caras | Claudius Maciel | |
| 2008 | Você Está Aqui | César | Episode: "15 Minutos" |
| 2009 | Caminho das Índias | Murilo Cavinato | |
| 2010 | A Cura | Dr. Luís Camilo | |
| 2011 | Cordel Encantado | Coronel Pedro Falcão | Episode: "23 de setembro" |
| 2012 | As Brasileiras | Marcelo | Episode: "A Apaixonada de Niterói" |
| 2012 | Salve Jorge | Celso Vieira Flores Galvão | |
| 2013 | Além do Horizonte | André Teixeira | |
| 2014 | Boogie Oogie | Paulo Almeida Fonseca | |
| 2016 | Unidade Básica | Dr. Paulo | |
| 2017 | Novo Mundo | Dr. Peter Zettl | |
| 2018 | Deus Salve o Rei | Hermes de Vicenza | Episodes: "February 7–14" |
| 2018 | Carcereiros | Jasão | Episode: "Questão de Método" |
| 2018 | Segundo Sol | Edgar Athayde dos Santos | |
| 2019 | Elis | César Camargo Mariano | |
| 2019 | Éramos Seis | João Aranha | Episodes: "October 11–November 30" |
| 2022 | Pantanal | Dr. Gustavo Sousa Aranha | |
| 2022 | Dates, Likes & Ladrilhos | Ernesto | |
| 2024 | Os Quatro da Candelária | Padre Moisés | |
| 2024 | Meu Sangue Ferve por Você: A Série | Jean Pierre | |
| 2025 | Vale Tudo | Estéban Munõs | Episodes: "May 31–June 25" |
