= Ferros =

Brazilian municipality

Coordinates: 19°13′55″S 43°1′22″W

- Municipality
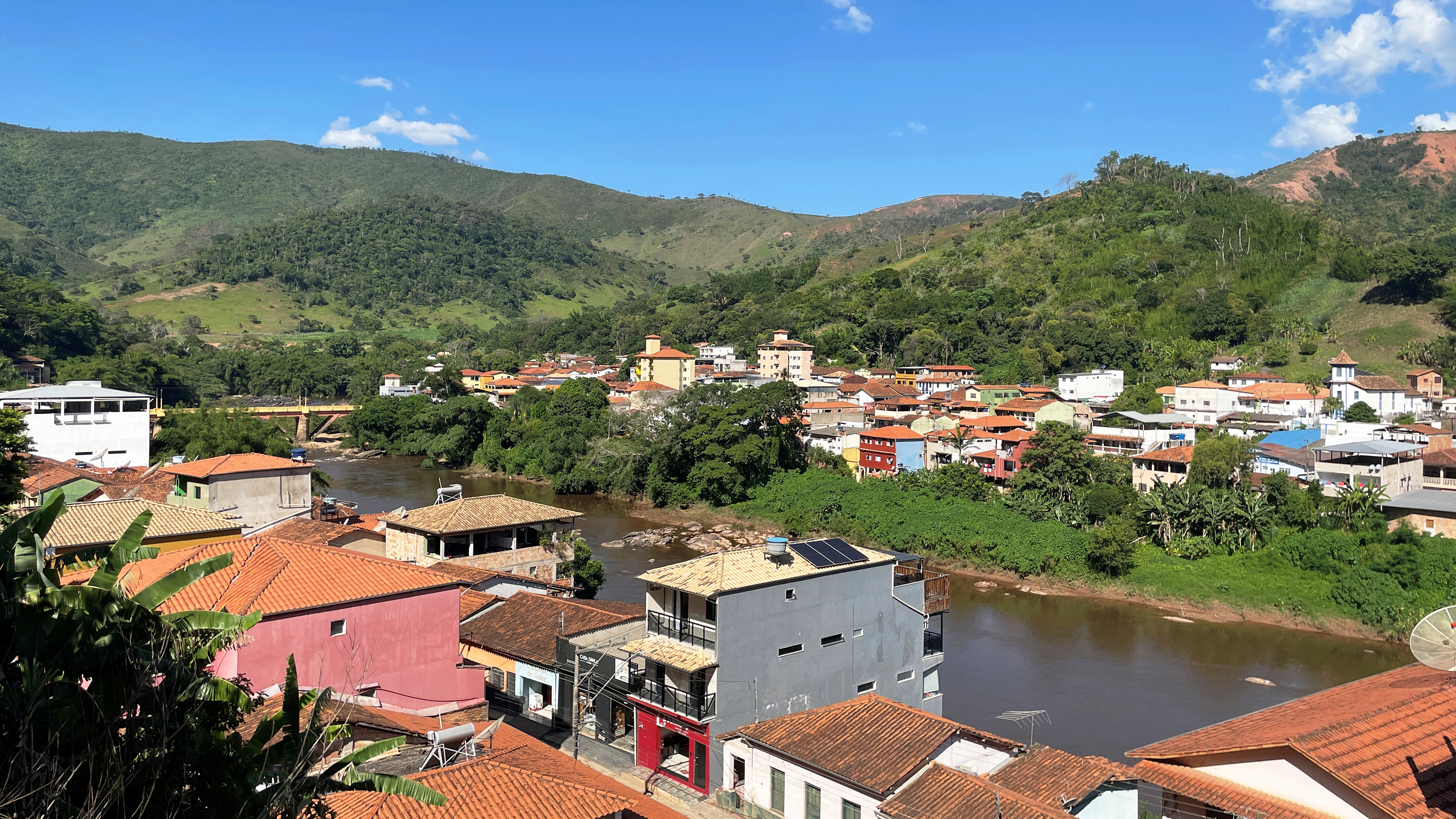
- Partial view of Ferros

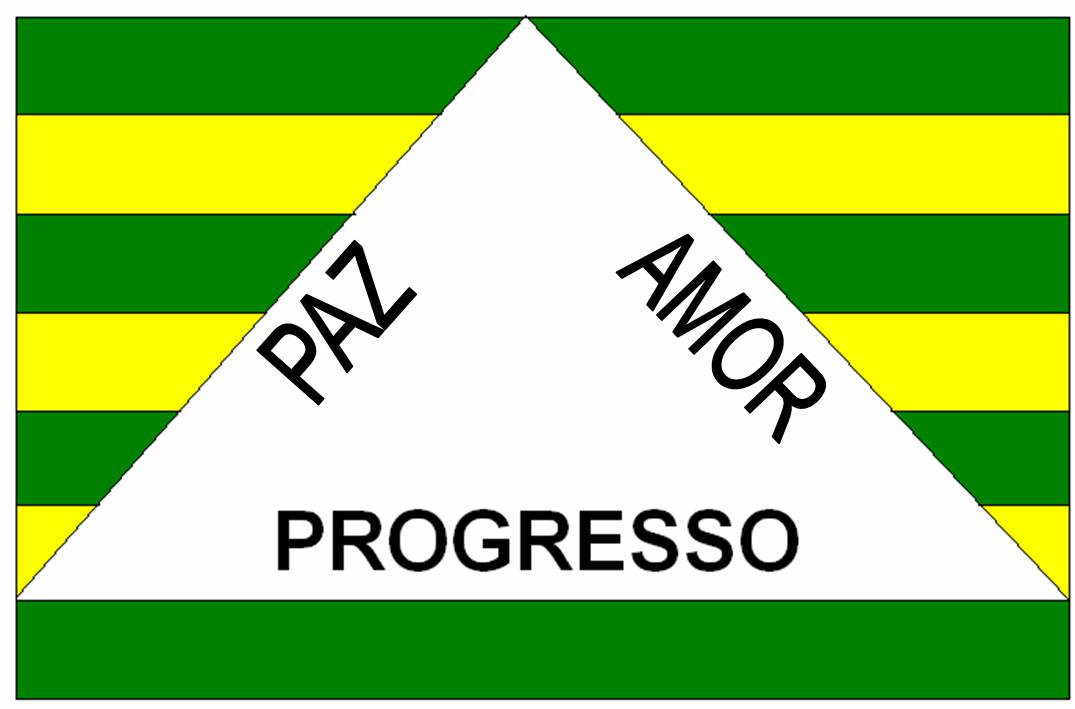
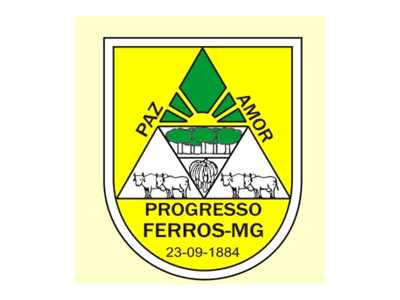
- Flag Coat of arms

- Location in Brazil
- Country: Brazil
- State: Minas Gerais
- Mesoregion: Belo Horizonte
- Microregion: Itabira

Population (2022 Census)
  - Total: 9,590
  - Estimate (2025): 9,603
- Time zone: UTC-3 (BRT)

Ferros is a Brazilian municipality located in the state of Minas Gerais. The city belongs to the mesoregion of Belo Horizonte and to the microregion of Itabira. As of 2025, the estimated population was 9,603.

From 2001 to 2023, São Pedro dos Ferros lost 4.28 kha of tree cover, equivalent to a 30% decrease in tree cover since 2000, and 2.28 Mt of CO₂e emissions.

Roberto Drummond was born in Ferros.

== See also ==
- List of municipalities in Minas Gerais
