= Cobras & Lagartos =

Brazilian telenovela by João Emanuel Carneiro

- Also known as: Snakes & Lizards
- Genre: Telenovela; Romance comedy
- Created by: João Emanuel Carneiro
- Starring: Mariana Ximenes; Daniel de Oliveira; Carolina Dieckmann; Henri Castelli; Taís Araújo; Lázaro Ramos
- Opening theme: Alô, Alô Marciano by Elis Regina
- Country of origin: Brazil
- Original language: Portuguese
- No. of episodes: 179; 140 (International version)

Production
- Running time: 65 minutes
- Production company: Central Globo de Produção

Original release
- Network: Rede Globo
- Release: 24 April – 18 November 2006

Cobras & Lagartos (English title: Snakes & Lizards) is a Brazilian telenovela that was produced and aired by TV Globo from 24 April to 18 November 2006, totaling 179 episodes.

The show featured Mariana Ximenes, Daniel de Oliveira as main protagonists, with Carmo Dalla Vecchia and Cléo Pires as co-protagonists, Lázaro Ramos and Taís Araújo as co-antagonists becoming co-protagonists, and Henri Castelli and Carolina Dieckmann in the lead antagonists/villain roles.

Lázaro Ramos was nominated in 2007 for best actor Emmy for his performance.

== Plot ==
Omar Pasquim (Francisco Cuoco) is a rich millionaire owner of the large network of luxury shops, Luxus, which sells clothing to jewelry. The entrepreneur has a disease that affects his life and has only a few months of survival. He knows this and fears that his inheritance go into the hands of those who do not deserve. Omar is from a poor background and worked hard all his life to build his empire.

As never married nor had children, Omar has as heirs his sister, hilarious and tricky Milu Montini (Marília Pêra), and his nephews, the ruthless and perverse Leona (Carolina Dieckmann), the Bel (Mariana Ximenes) desajuízado Tomas (Leonardo Miggiorin) and graceful. All of these, only Bel Millionaire deserves consideration, because the others are selfish parasites. The curious thing is that his favorite niece lives at odds with him because he considers selfish, rude and greedy. And she never tires of telling him I did not want a penny of his inheritance. Meanwhile, Milu who lives a case with the scoundrel hiding Octaviano (Herson Capri) decides to put into practice by the Octaviano and his son Tomas a plan to defeat Omar and steal all the wealth of the millionaire.

Meanwhile, other relatives of Omar and even people close to him and his family does not belong to the most sordid plot plans to put his hands on his fortune. To know the real intentions of each of these people, Omar masquerades as a friendly janitor, named as Pereira and watch the nest of snakes and lizards in which he lives, without knowing that the millionaire is close by.

The villain Leona, cousin of Bel, besides coveting the wealth of Omar, is also her boyfriend's lover, the dangerous Estevão (Henri Castelli). Bel, but discovers her boyfriend's betrayal, desolate, end up being hit by the office boy Duda (Daniel de Oliveira), for whom he later comes to love. Duda is a responsible and honest man who lost his parents in an accident and Silvana lives with his aunt, uncle and cousin Jelly entrepreneur Oran. But Duda has always been coveted by Leona, and always rejected the blonde, who decides to separate evil and Bel Duda with the help of Nicole Ortega, in an opportunistic way to help solve Leona money, separating Duda and Bel.

Nikki (Tania Khalill), as is known, ends up having an affair with Estevão and at a time, discovers the blows of the villain, who came to kill people in order to enrich themselves. Estevão is the son of Octaviano, the lover of Snowy and betray his second wife Celina (Ângela Vieira), with whom he had two daughters: Leticia (Cléo Pires) and the rebel comprehensive Julia (Luiza Mariani), who works at Luxus.

Leticia is a young scholar, but a rebel who lives at odds with Estevão, who comes to the point of hospitalization in a nursing sister. Leticia, but ends up finding love with the mysterious Luciano (Carmo Dalla Vechia), an agile and clever man who tries to start life years ago after he was presumed dead in a car accident, which had been planned by dangerous people who were interested in money by Luciano, which in turn was rich and millionaire.

In the popular novel, which depicts the neighborhood Saara (popular shopping area in Rio de Janeiro), and Duda's family is also blessed Eva Padilha. This is martyring lives believing that his greatest sin was to fall in love and marry a thief, Serafim, that despite the "profession" is a very loving father to Jonah, Kika, Mada and Lurdinha. Only Eva Padilla carries in itself sordid secrets of whom feared to reveal, is that unintentionally, it has two distinct personalities: the religious Eve Padilha and also the lively Emerald, personality opposite of Eve, where pleasure and joy reigns in their choices and atituldes, causing much confusion in the lives of others around you.

It is also living in the Saara Cremator, a trickster who takes life based on lies. He lives surrounded by people who are dying to see him in the back, Ramires as his father, stepmother Shirley and his brothers, and Sandrinha Teo. Since adolescence, Cremator is in love with Ellen, a seller of Luxus just thinking of going up in life. By a stroke of fate, the fortune of Omar, will not stop just at the hands of Bel, but also in the Cremator, Duda confused with another, the two have the same name: Daniel Miranda.

And from there, the life of a Cremator will turn on all the other characters. Omar dies, and he will be rich in place of Dudley, knowing that the money was not for him, and it will attract many suitors, like Ellen, who despised him as poor, and who now courted him after getting rich. His family also will treat you right after the money. Cremator, in turn, will be in the hands of Leona and Stephen, who know that fortune was not to be him, but Dudla's, Leona's love. Ellen is the Alida of two and three, will do much harm Cremator, Bel and Duda. Snowy faram Octaviano and Thomas also hurt many people and enjoy the full power of Leona.

Leona and Estevão Bel exposes more is already married to him. She decides to separate, the more he will be entitled to whatever it is, including the Luxus, she shares with Cremator. Bel goes to live with Duda, and faces a different reality: goes to live in a cramped house in Center City, without luxury and comfort, and began working at the store for perfumes Silvana, Dudlas aunt, as it is professional and perfumer produces them. Leona gun in a car accident with Nikki, who dies when the car skids a ravine. Without the help of Nikki, Leona weapon against Bel and seduces Duda takes to bed and seduces the young man for contempt of Bel, which in turn is sterile and therefore can not have children. Bel but help solve Duda and Leona, despised, resolves soon get their hands on his uncle's fortune, with the help of Estevão, a blow gun millionaire in Luxus and steals all the money of it, getting rich and fleeing to the U.S.A.

A year passes. Leona rich and powerful around the U.S.. His son was born here and hidden from all three weeks of life was there, and she with Stephen. Leona back ready to reactivate the Luxus, which was closed for a year, since she gave a blow millionaire in the entire system. She and Stephen are persecuting and torturing all who pass his way. Leona is still crazy for Duda, and will not rest until we see him at his feet, and your child will use it to reconnect it. Leona decides to separate from Bel Dudley, using the child as a shield.

Cremator remains poor, the more it becomes a better person. Ellen repent of all, after almost dying at the hands of Leona, who tries to kill her stifled, and begins to date him with heart and they will live together and work of cleaners for a living.

Estevão is accused by his crimes, and he receives an arrest warrant. He hides out in Luxus until the next day to leave the country, but ends up being murdered in a brutal and cruel blows of the scissors. Leona takes advantage of the situation, find the murder weapon before the police and digital Bel puts the scissors while she sleeps. Leona incriminates Bel, and Bel will prey. But Luciano, who discovered the son of Omar, became president of Luxus by right of inheritance and decides to make an agreement with Leona: Bel She released from prison, and he offers him the position of the Presidency of Luxus to her.

Leona is commanding everything and everyone, but mad with delusions of cleaning, including requiring all employees to paint his hair blonde like her. One day she calls and Dudley to visit her son, he will, and suddenly, she locks the doors and windows, locks himself in with Dudley Luxus, and Ithaca fire in the room where they are, he is desperate, but Cremator, repentant and trying to prove he always liked the friend enters a shortcut into the room, and tells Dudley that there is a way out. But Leona, Dudley pulls for you, saying that they will die together, Dudley takes his son and goes to the Cremator pulling Leona to go along with them and save himself, but she is willing to kill themselves with it inside. But a pillar crumbles to Leona, who died crushed and charred.

Cremator and Duda are leaving the Luxus, when a pillar collapses in Cremator, and Duda had to move on to save his son, but returned to help his friend. Time passes and Cremator is between life and death in hospital, while Duda, Bel Elles and donate blood. He recovers and decides to marry Ellen.

Some years pass. Duda and Bel already married adopt two children, a brother and sister orphans. They begin to have a complete family: Seven children and a couple united and passionate. They begin to create the son of Dudley as well. Bel managed to have four children through treatment and is very happy. Snowy to his despair, turned street vendor, and spends his spare time applying blows into millionaires. Thomas turns male prostitute to survive and help his mother, while Octaviano runs away with her money along with the Sandrinha, fiery sister of Foguinho. Foguinho and Ellen have four children and are happy. The two resume their lives by opening an ice cream shop.

== Cast ==
Actor	Character
Mariana Ximenes	Maria Isabel Gonçalves Pasquim (Bel)
Daniel de Oliveira	Daniel Salgado Miranda (Duda)
Carolina Dieckmann	Leona Pasquim Montini
Henri Castelli	Estevão Pacheco
Lázaro Ramos	Daniel Miranda Café (Foguinho)
Taís Araújo	Ellen dos Santos
Cléo Pires	Letícia Pacheco
Carmo Dalla Vecchia	Luciano Botelho / Martim
Francisco Cuoco	Omar Pasquim / Vicentino Pereira
Totia Meireles	Silvana Salgado Munhoz
Marília Pêra	Milu Montini (Maria Lúcia Pasquim Montini)
Leonardo Miggiorin	Tomás Pasquim Montini
Eliane Giardini	Eva Padilha / Esmeralda
Otávio Augusto	Serafim Padilha
Herson Capri	Otaviano Pacheco
Ângela Vieira	Celina Gonçalves Pacheco
Tania Khalill	Nicole "Nikki" Ortega / Carla Braga / Lilian Leme
Christiana Kalache	Francisca "Kika" Padilha
Elizângela	Shirley Miranda Café
Ailton Graça	Ramires Miranda Café
Iran Malfitano	Teotônio "Téo" Miranda / Olavo "Olavinho" Menezes de Aragão
Maria Maya	Sandra "Sandrinha" Miranda
Luiza Mariani	Júlia Pacheco
Nanda Costa	Maria Madalena "Madá" Padilha
Bruna Marquezine	Lurdes "Lurdinha" Padilha
Gustavo Falcão	Jonas Padilha
Cássia Kiss	Henriqueta / Teresa Pacheco
Milton Gonçalves	Jair dos Santos
Luís Melo	Orã Munhoz / Conchita
Walter Breda	Tufi (Tufo)
Kayky Brito	Nicolas Salgado Munhoz
Matheus Costa	Fernando Alvim (Sushi)
Rafael Ciani	Geraldo Salgado Munhoz (Geléia)
Mara Manzan	Marilene
Fafy Siqueira	Valquíria
Cássio Reis	Murilo Ortega
Odilon Wagner	Alberto Botelho
Stepan Nercessian	Bandeira
Victor Peralles	Igor
Renato Rabello	DJ Macarrão
Leonardo Jabbour	Gus Melutti
Guilherme Winter	Flu Melutti
Renata Ghelli	Magali
Carolina Magalhães	Diana
Tina Kara	Karina
Miguel Nader	Cardoso

== Audience ==
Timeslot	# Eps.	Premiere		Finale		Rank	Season	Average viewership
Timeslot	# Eps.	Date	Viewers (in points)	Date	Viewers (in points)	Rank	Season	Average viewership
Monday—Saturday; 7:15 pm	179	24 April 2006	35.0	17 November 2006	46	#1	2006	38.2
