= Lupe Gigliotti =

Brazilian actress (1926–2010)

- Born: 1 July 1926; Ceará, Brazil
- Died: 19 December 2010 (aged 84); Rio de Janeiro, Brazil
- Occupation: Actress

Lupe Gigliotti (1 July 1926 – 19 December 2010) was a Brazilian television, stage, and film actress.

Gigliotti was born Maria Paula Viana Lupicina in Maranguape, Ceará, Brazil, on 1 July 1926. She was the sister of Brazilian actor and comedian Chico Anysio and the aunt of actor Marcos Palmeira. She began acting professionally during the 1960s, appearing in 11 films during her career.

Gigliotti became famous for her role as Dona Escolástica on the comedic television show, Escolinha do Professor Raimundo. She played Signora Botega in the 1984 American film Blame It on Rio.

Gigliotti's last television appearance was on the Globo telenovela, Cama de Gato, as Áurea in early 2010.

Lupe Gigliotti died at her home in Copacabana, Rio de Janeiro, on 19 December 2010, at the age of 84. She had been suffering from lung cancer.

== Filmography ==
Year	Title	Role	Notes
1975	Os Condenados		
1976	Perdida		
1984	Blame It on Rio	Signora Botega	
1990	Escolinha do Professor Raimundo	Escolástica	TV series
1999	Zoando na TV		
2002	Sítio do Picapau Amarelo	Bruxa Velha	TV series
2003	Sítio do Picapau Amarelo	Senhora que dá carona para o Bacamarte	TV series
2003	So Normal	Mãe de Sérgio	
2004–2005	Sítio do Picapau Amarelo	Dona Joaninha	TV series
2008	A Guerra dos Rocha	Anita	
2009	Divã	Dona Eulália	
