= Sangue do Meu Sangue =

- Also known as: Same Flesh, Same Blood
- Genre: Telenovela
- Created by: Vicente Sesso
- Directed by: Del Rangel; Nilton Travesso
- Country of origin: Brazil
- Original language: Portuguese
- No. of episodes: 257

Production
- Running time: 70 minutes

Original release
- Network: SBT
- Release: July 11, 1995 – May 4, 1996

Related
- Sangue do Meu Sangue (1969)

Sangue do Meu Sangue is a Brazilian telenovela produced by the SBT, shown from 11 of July 1995 to 4 of May 1996, originally by Vicente Sesso, adapted by Paulo Figueiredo and Rita Buzzar (substituted for the Vicente Sesso), and directed by Nilton Travesso, Enrique Martins, Antonino Seabra and Del Rangel. General direction of Nilton Travesso.

== Story ==
The story is set in nineteenth-century Brazil, in the time of the Second Empire. To prevent the embezzlement that had given the banker's father was discovered, Clovis causes a bombing incident to injure Carlos Camargo, an official who could incriminate him. Carlos survives, but loses his memory and can not remember his beloved Helena and his children, named Lucio, Cynthia, and Ricardo.

Ten years pass. Wandering the streets, Carlos joins the troupe of gypsies Raposo, who welcome him, and he reclaims his memory. He then proceeds to live day-to-day life without his family. He continues living and struggling to pay Clovis for all the evils he committed. Besides embezzlement and attempted murder, he oppresses his wife, Julia, tries to convince everyone that she is crazy and mistreats slaves, among other atrocities. Amid the plot is the actress Pola Renon, who was the lover of Charles and his supposed death began to help his family, without revealing anything about the novel. The eldest son of Carlos, Lucio, falls in love with Pola. Their lives and dramas are bolstered by the machinations of the abolition of slavery. There is a fight featuring Julia as an ally when she decides to break free from the clutches of an oppressive husband who she does not love.

== Cast ==
- Tarcísio Filho - Lúcio
- Bia Seidl - Pola
- Jayme Periard – Carlos
- Lucélia Santos - Júlia
- Osmar Prado - Clóvis
- Lucinha Lins - Helena
- Jandira Martini - Rebeca
- Rubens de Falco - Mário
- Cacá Rosset - Raposo
- Delano Avelar – Maurício
- Paulo Figueiredo - Paranhos Lieutenant
- Flávia Monteiro - Cíntia
- Rubens Caribé - Ricardo
- Bete Coelho - Fabrício/ Fernanda
- Marcos Caruso - Conde Giorgio
- Magali Biff - Suzana
- Ewerton de Castro - Lourenço
- Yara Lins – Mariana
- Tônia Carrero - Cecile Renon
- Irene Ravache - Isabel Princess
- Angelina Muniz - Zulmira
