= Raposa (disambiguation) =

Raposa is a Brazilian municipality

Raposa may also refer to:

- Raposa, or South American fox
- HMS Raposa
- Raymond Raposa
- RAPOSA, Portuguese robot for Search and Rescue operations

== See also ==
- Raposo
