= Maysa: Quando Fala o Coração =

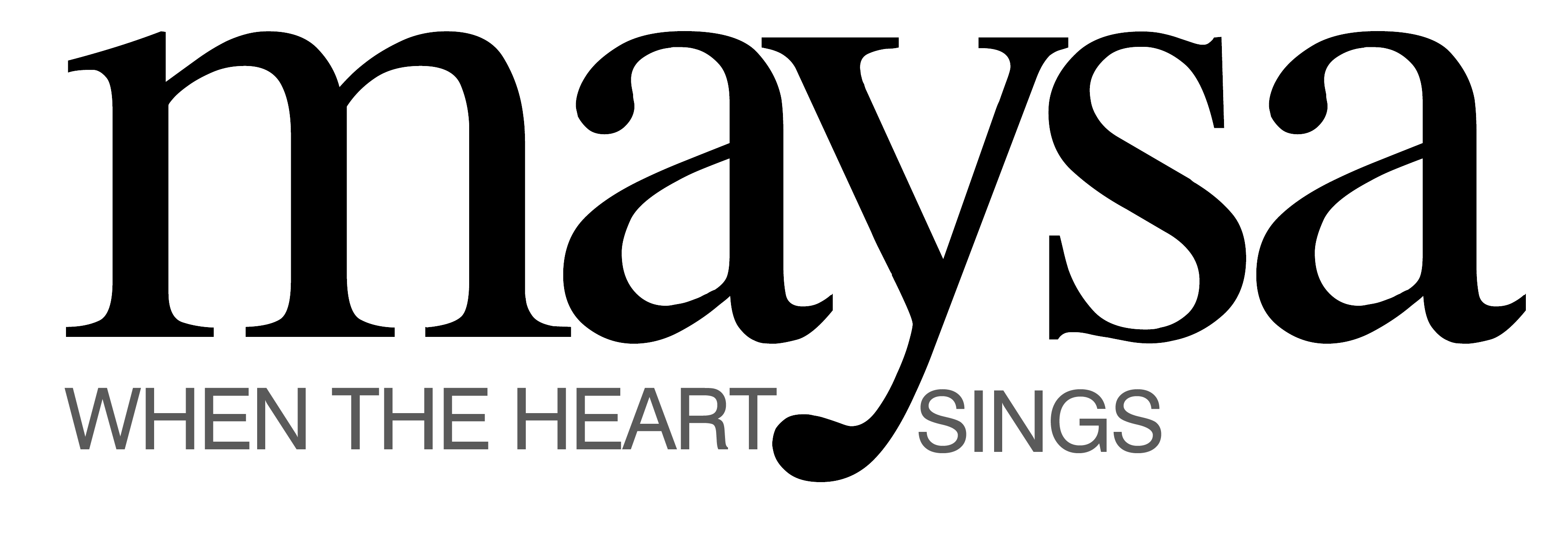
- Created by: Manoel Carlos
- Starring: Larissa Maciel; Eduardo Semerjian; Mateus Solano; Jayme Matarazzo
- Country of origin: Brazil
- Original language: Portuguese
- No. of episodes: 9

Original release
- Network: Rede Globo
- Release: January 5 – January 16, 2009

Maysa: Quando Fala o Coração (English: Maysa - When the heart sings) is a 2009 Brazilian miniseries written by Manoel Carlos and directed by Jayme Monjardim. It's starring Larissa Maciel in the role of Maysa Matarazzo.

In 2009, was nominated for Best TV Movie/Mini-Series at the 37th International Emmy Awards.

== Plot ==
At seventeen, filled with dreams and hopes, Maysa marries the love of her life, Andre Matarazzo, an industry titan with whom she has her only son, Jayme Monjardim. The strictness of life in the family mansion, however, contrasts with the festive and artistic environment in which she grew up. Despite Andre’s opposition, Maysa’s superb voice lands her an invitation to record an album, and her music becomes an instant success. Maysa’s new, demanding career results in the collapse of her marriage and takes a toll on her relationship with Jayme.

In search of professional achievement, she risks everything and immerses her body and soul into singing. She earns standing ovations while crisscrossing the globe. Once divorced, she engages in turbulent relationships. She breaks taboos and defies conventions. And she dies tragically and prematurely. Maysa - when the heart sings: the story of a woman ahead of her time, who gave herself to life and to love with the same intensity as she composed and performed.

== Cast ==
- Larissa Maciel — Maysa
- Eduardo Semerjian — André Matarazzo
- Mateus Solano — Ronaldo Bôscoli
- Jayme Matarazzo — Jayme Monjardim (young)
- Nelson Baskerville — Alcebíades Monjardim (Monja)
- Ângela Dip — Ináh Monjardim
- Marat Descartes — Carlos Alberto
- Cristine Perón — Nara Leão
- Priscilla Rozenbaum — Ana
- Denise Weinberg — Amália
- Pablo Bellini — Miguel Azanza
- Melissa Vettore — Gabriela
- Simone Soares — Nina
- Beto Matos — Régis
- Caio Sóh — Guto (Augusto)
- Cristiane Carniato — Marlene
- Fátima Montenegro — Yvone
- Rogério Falabella — Andrea Matarazzo
- André Matarazzo — Jayme Monjardim (child)

== Ratings ==
Episode #	Ratings	Reference
Episode. 1	30 Rating	
Episode. 2	30 Rating	
Episode. 3	28 Rating	
Episode. 4	29 Rating	
Episode. 5	25 Rating	
Episode. 6	23 Rating	
Episode. 7	23 Rating	
Episode. 8	24 Rating	
Episode. 9	23 Rating	

- Rating average: 26,1 in Grande São Paulo.

== Awards and nominations ==
Year	Award	Category	Result
2009	37th International Emmy Awards	International Emmy Award for best TV movie or miniseries	Nominated
2009	São Paulo Association of Art Critics	Best Actress in a Television for Larissa Maciel	Won

== International Exhibition ==
Year	Country	Television network
2010	Mozambique	STV
2012	Portugal	Globo Premium
