= Juliana Knust =

Brazilian actress

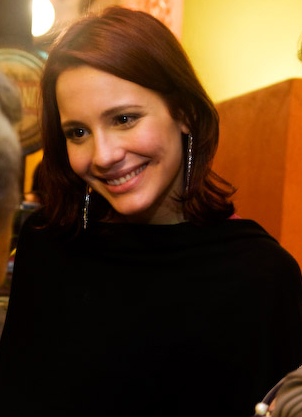
- Born: Juliana Knust Sampaio; 29 May 1981 (age 43); Niterói, Rio de Janeiro, Brazil
- Occupation: Actress
- Height: 1,64
- Spouse: Gustavo Machado
- Children: 2

Juliana Knust Sampaio (born 29 May 1981, in Niterói, Rio de Janeiro) is a Brazilian actress.

Knust began her career in the 1997 season of Malhação. But it was in 2003, starring alongside Malu Mader in the soap opera Celebridade, where she played Sandra, that her career was consolidated. After that, she appeared on the cover of several magazines such as Fitness and VIP, and posed nude for the cover of the Brazilian edition of Playboy on 13 December 2007.

== Career ==
Knust began studying theater age 12. She enrolled in a vocational school for the performing arts, taking courses in video and stage and, after making some contacts and some tests, she was given a place in the Actors Workshop of the Globe.

Knust began her career at 15 when she presented an educational program with Regina Case. Her acting debut was interpreting the part of the fat Laura in Rede Globo's teen soap, Malhação. After that, she appeared in Bambuluá, Sandy & Junior, Sítio do Picapau Amarelo and an episode of Carga Pesada, receiving an invitation to play Sandra in Celebridade in 2003.

Since then, she has appeared in soap operas and shows like A Diarista, América and Cobras & Lagartos. Soon after starting his TV work, Juliana began to discover also the theatrical universe. Participated in the plays "Pequena Sereia", "Pocahontas", "Pai, Qual é a tua?" e "Tudo de Bom".

Knust appeared in the short film Vila Isabel, alongside Paulo Goulart and Nicette Bruno. She also worked in Achados e Perdidos (2005) and Xuxa e o Tesouro da Cidade Perdida (2004).

In 2007, she had a part in TV dram Duas Caras and in the theater with the play Alarme Falso.

In 2008, she appeared in the series Casos e Acasos and Faça Sua História.

In 2009, she was in the theater with the play Vergonha dos Pés, alongside actor Danton Mello. And he made a cameo in "A Turma do Didi".

In 2010, she was in the series A Vida Alheia written by Miguel Falabella. The following year, Knust was in a series of episodes of Macho Man. Between 2011 and 2012, plays the part of Zuleika in the soap Fina Estampa.

In 2013, returns to television for a cameo on the soap opera side Lado a Lado. Is beside the actor Eri Johnson stars in the play Pequeno Dicionário Amoroso. Currently stars in the series Uma Rua Sem Vergonha in Multishow, in which she plays a call girl Marlene. In 2015 she returns to TV in the 23rd season of Malhação, as an advisor Bia.

In 2017, he signs with RecordTV and integrates the cast of the first phase of the novel Belaventura playing the queen Vitoriana and then stars in a novel Apocalipse alongside Igor Rickli and Sérgio Marone.

== Personal life ==
Knust married the designer Gustavo Machado on 8 September 2009. She has a son, Mateus. On 27 February 2015 the couple's second child, Arthur, was born.

== Filmography ==
=== Television ===
Year	Title	Role	Notes
1997	Malhação	Laura	Season 3
1999	Você Decide	Lídia	Episode: "Romântica Até Certo Ponto"
1999	Você Decide	Mari	Episode: "Transas de Família: Part 2"
2000	Esplendor	Helena Bernardes	
2000	Bambuluá	Amanda Flores (Amandinha)	
2002	Desejos de Mulher	Andréa Vargas (young)	Episode: "January 21, 2002"
2002	Sandy & Junior	Leila Costa Bastos	Season 4
2003	Carga Pesada	Júlia	Episode: "A Grande Viagem"
2003	Sítio do Picapau Amarelo	Piracema	Episode: "Os Bandeirantes"
2003	Celebridade	Sandra Mello Diniz Moutinho	
2004	A Diarista	Herself	Episode: "Aquele do Projac"
2005	América	Inesita Gimenez	
2006	Cobras & Lagartos	Henriqueta (young)	Episode: "April 27, 2006"
2007	Duas Caras	Débora Vieira Melgaço	
2008	Casos e Acasos	Júlia	Episode: "As Testemunhas, o Hóspede e os Amantes"
2008	Faça Sua História	Vanessa Ludmila	Episode: "Bandeira 5"; Episode: "A Guerra de Tróia"
2008	Casos e Acasos	Patrícia	Episode: "A Ciumenta, o Ciumento e o Ciúme"
2009	A Turma do Didi	Herself	Episode: "Dia de Faxina"
2010	A Vida Alheia	Fúlvia Lara	Episode: "A Bolsa"
2011	Macho Man	Frederic's Coiffeur Customer	Episode: "Piolhos no Salão"
2011	Doce Veneno	Úrsula Veiga de Paula	
2011	Fina Estampa	Zuleika	
2013	Lado a Lado	Fátima	Episodes: "February 13–March 8, 2013"
2013	Uma Rua Sem Vergonha	Marlene	
2015	Malhação: Seu Lugar no Mundo	Maria Beatriz Pereira Andrade (Bia)	Season 23
2017	Belaventura	Queen Vitoriana Montebelo and Luxemburgo	Episode: "July 25–26, 2017"
2017	Apocalipse	Zoe Santero	

=== Film ===
Year	Title	Role
2004	Xuxa e o Tesouro da Cidade Perdida	Jéssica
2006	Achados e Perdidos	Flor
2009	Intruso	Sabrina

=== Internet ===
Year	Title	Role	Notes	Channel
2014	Viral	Diana	Episode 4	Porta dos Fundos

== Theater ==
Year	Title	Role
2007	Alarme Falso	
2009	A República em Laguna	Anita Garibaldi
2009	Vergonha dos Pés	Fernanda Young
2013	Pequeno Dicionário Amoroso	Luíza
2017	Por Isso Fui Embora	Pérola
