= Time and the Wind =

2013 film directed by Jayme Monjardim

- Theatrical release poster
- Directed by: Jayme Monjardim
- Screenplay by: Tabajara Ruas
- Based on: O Tempo e o Vento by Erico Verissimo
- Starring: Thiago Lacerda; Marjorie Estiano; Fernanda Montenegro; Cléo Pires
- Cinematography: Affonso Beato
- Music by: Alexandre Guerra
- Production companies: Globo Filmes; Nexus
- Distributed by: Downtown Filmes
- Release date: 27 September 2013 (Brazil)
- Running time: 115 minutes
- Country: Brazil
- Languages: Portuguese; Spanish
- Budget: R$ 13,000,000
- Box office: R$ 7,700,000

Time and the Wind (Portuguese: O Tempo e o Vento) is a 2013 Brazilian epic drama film based on a series of novels written by the Brazilian author Erico Verissimo. The film was directed by Jayme Monjardim and starring Thiago Lacerda, Marjorie Estiano, Fernanda Montenegro, and Cléo Pires.

== Plot ==
Based on the novel trilogy of the same name, by Erico Verissimo, Time and the Wind follows 150 years of family Terra Cambará and their opponent Amaral family. The history of struggles between the two families begins by the time of the Jesuit Missions and runs until the end of the 19th century. The film also features the period of formation of the State of Rio Grande do Sul and the dispute of territory between the Portuguese and Spanish crowns.

== Cast ==
- Thiago Lacerda as Capitão Rodrigo Cambará
- Cléo Pires as Ana Terra
- Suzana Pires as Ana Terra
- Fernanda Montenegro as Bibiana Terra Cambará
- Marjorie Estiano as Bibiana Terra Cambará
- Janaína Kremer as Bibiana Terra Cambará
- Luiz Carlos Vasconcelos as Maneco
- César Troncoso as Father Alonzo
- Leonardo Machado as Marciano Bezerra
- José de Abreu as Ricardo Amaral
- Paulo Goulart as Ricardo Amaral Neto
- Leonardo Medeiros as Bento Amaral
- Cris Pereira as Juvenal Terra
- Marat Descartes as Licurgo
- Vanessa Lóes as Maria Valéria
- Mayana Moura as Luzia
- Igor Rickli as Bolívar
- Rafael Cardoso as Florêncio
- Matheus Costa as Pedro Missioneiro
- Martín Rodríguez as Pedro Missioneiro
- Áurea Baptista as Arminda
- Cyria Coentro as Henriqueta Terra

== Awards ==
- Best Film, Trophy Lente de Cristal - V Cinefest Brasil/Montevideo.
