= Sete Vidas =

Brazilian telenovela

- Also known as: Parts Of Me
- Genre: Telenovela; Drama
- Created by: Lícia Manzo
- Directed by: Jayme Monjardim
- Starring: Domingos Montagner; Débora Bloch; Jayme Matarazzo; Isabelle Drummond; Maria Flor; Regina Duarte; Thiago Rodrigues see more
- Country of origin: Brazil
- Original language: Portuguese
- No. of episodes: 106 (75 International version)

Production
- Production locations: Brazil; El Calafate, Argentina
- Running time: 50 minutes

Original release
- Network: TV Globo
- Release: March 9 – July 10, 2015

Sete Vidas (Literally English: Seven Lives, International title: Parts of Me) is a Brazilian telenovela produced and broadcast by TV Globo from March 9 to July 10, 2015 replacing Boogie Oogie.

It was created by Lícia Manzo and starred by Domingos Montagner, Debora Bloch, Vanessa Gerbelli, Jayme Matarazzo, Isabelle Drummond, Maria Flor, Regina Duarte and Thiago Rodrigues.

== Plot ==
Miguel (Domingos Montagner) is a photographer who has been traumatized by life, which is why he lives in exile in a remote location, currently on an expedition in Antarctica. In the past, he made an anonymous donation to a sperm bank, resulting in seven children born to different mothers. At one point, the seven children discover their father's identity and embark on a clandestine search for him. Everyone knows each other through lanes on the Internet, and they take flight to the place where Miguel is. The seven children go through various hassles to reach the parent, how to survive the sinking of a vessel, commanded by one of them who is Argentine and lives in El Calafate, on the border between Argentina and Chile.

At the same time, Julia (Isabelle Drummond), young generated via artificial insemination, registration number of the possession of their anonymous donor, discovers, through a specialized site, that she has a half-brother, Pedro (Jayme Matarazzo). The two make an appointment which, through a series of circumstances, ends up frustrating. On the way home, they inadvertently bump into each other at random, not knowing who the other is. The brief confusion, resulting in mutual attraction, makes them initiate a life marked by the weight of impossible love.

Its contribution has allowed some women to realize their dream of having children through IVF treatment. After being rescued, he will live a love triangle with Ligia (Débora Bloch) and Marina (Vanessa Gerbelli). The seven lives, that is, the seven children conceived through insemination, end up discovering the identity of Michael and know each other over the Internet through lanes. Together they organized a clandestine and dangerous search for her father, who survives a shipwreck.

The desired interaction between the six new stepbrothers, however, will soon be shaken: unable to control the feelings that nourish one another, Pedro and Julia end up giving a kiss that will separate them. Deeply guilty, come to the conclusion that should no longer live.

== Cast ==
Actor/Actress	Character
Domingos Montagner	João Miguel Oliveira Sanches
Débora Bloch	Lígia Fiúza Macedo
Isabelle Drummond	Júlia de Moraes Brandão
Jayme Matarazzo	Pedro Martins Vieira
Thiago Rodrigues	Luís Thompson Viana
Maria Eduarda de Carvalho	Laila Thompson Viana
Ghilherme Lobo	Bernardo Figueira Meira
Michel Noher	Felipe Soares Viegas
Regina Duarte	Esther Viana
Malu Galli	Irene Fiúza Macedo
Cyria Coentro	Marlene Figueira Meira
Bianca Comparato	Diana Ferreira da Silva
Mariana Lima	Isabel Barreto
Leonardo Medeiros	Lauro
Ângelo Antônio	Vicente Martins Vieira
Letícia Colin	Elisa de Moraes Ribeiro
Gisele Fróes	Marta de Moraes Brandão
Fábio Herford	Eriberto de Souza e Melo
Fernanda Rodrigues	Virgínia
André Frateschi	Arthur Martins Vieira
Maria Flor	Taís Medeiros
Vanessa Gerbelli	Marina Bastos
Jean Pierre Noher	Diego Viegas
Maria Manoella	Branca
Cláudia Mello	Guida de Moraes Ribeiro
Fernando Belo	Edgard Pires
Fernando Eiras	Renan
Sílvia Lourenço	Olívia
Cláudio Jaborandy	Durval
Gabriel Palhares	Luca
Milena Melo	Sophia
Jesuíta Barbosa	Miguel (young)
Luiz Serra	Aníbal
Walderez de Barros	Iara
Fernando Alves Pinto	Caio
Emílio de Mello	Vinícius
Selma Egrei	Dália
Cristine Perón	Bia
Simone Soares	Soraia
Talita Tilieri	Bárbara
Julia Konrad	Valentina

== Ratings ==
Timeslot	No. of episodes	Premiered		Ended		Position	Season	Average rating
Timeslot	No. of episodes	Date	Premiere Ratings	Date	Finale Ratings	Position	Season	Average rating
Monday—Saturday; 18:20 (BRT)	106	March 9, 2015	20	July 10, 2015	20	#1	2015	
