= Milena Toscano =

Brazilian actress

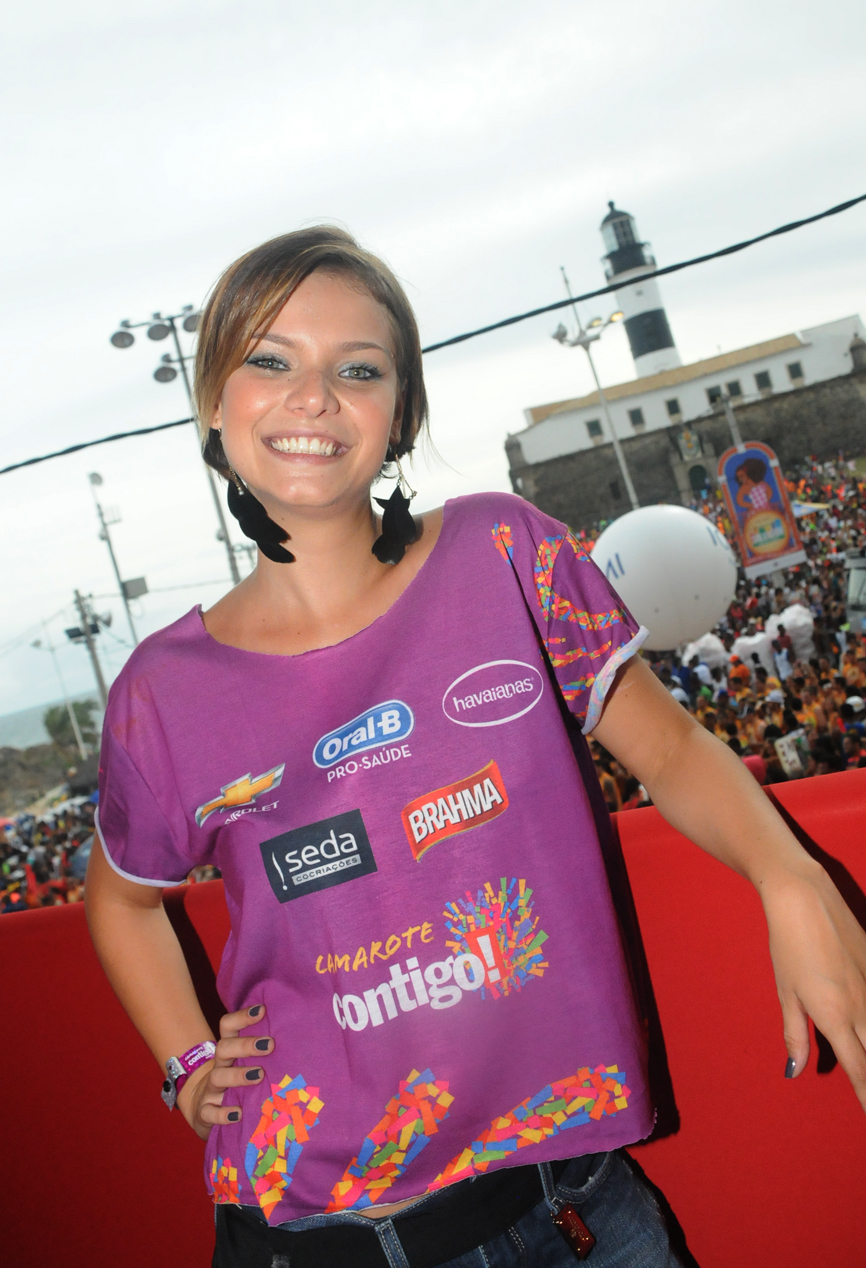
- Born: Milena Toscano Gonçalves; January 11, 1984 (age 42); Santo André, São Paulo, Brazil
- Occupations: Actress; model
- Years active: 2001–present
- Parent(s): Maria Goretti Izilda Gonçalves (mother); Miguel Toscano (father)
- Relatives: Mateus Toscano (older brother)

Milena Toscano Gonçalves (born January 11, 1984), is a Brazilian actress.

== Career ==
Born in Santo André, São Paulo, Milena Toscano started her career as a model when she was ten years-old, after she was hired by the Ford Models Agency. She performed in her first TV commercial when she was 13 years old. After attending many performing arts schools such as Studio Fátima Toledo, Casa de Artes de Laranjeiras and Escola Livre de Teatro, she was signed by Rede Globo. She debuted in the 2004 telenovela Começar de Novo, playing the character Sofia. Milena Toscano played Martina in SBT's remake of the Mexican telenovela Los Ricos También Lloran, named Los Ricos também Choram, which aired from 2005 to 2006. In 2007, Milena played Anita Garibaldi in the Italian-Brazilian film Anita - Una vita per Garibaldi directed by the Italian filmmaker Aurelio Grimaldi. She also played a lead role in 2010, in the Rede Globo telenovela Araguaia, playing Manuela Martinez. She played the character Vanessa in the 2011 telenovela Fina Estampa. Milena Toscano played an abolitionist and feminist named Filipa do Amaral in the 2016 Escrava Mãe.

== Filmography ==
=== Telenovelas ===
Year	Title	Role	Comments
2004	Da Cor do Pecado	Fan of Thor and Dionísio	Cameo
2004	Começar de Novo	Sofia	Cameo
2005–2006	Os Ricos também Choram	Martina	
2007	Amazônia, de Galvez a Chico Mendes	Ilka Jobim	
2007	Eterna Magia	Elisa	
2008	Casos e Acasos	Janaina	Episode "O desejo escondido, o cara reprimido e o livro roubado"
2008	Faça Sua História	Cinthia	Episode "Oswaldir Superstar"
2008	Poeira em Alto Mar	Joana	First season
2009	TV Globinho	Herself	TV presenter
2009	Caminho das Índias	Gilda	Cameo
2009	Malhação	Paloma	Co-antagonist
2009–2010	Os Caras de Pau	Beatriz	All episodes
2010–2011	Araguaia	Manuela	Protagonist
2011	Dança do Famosos 8	Herself	Participant (Domingão do Faustão's reality show)
2011–2012	Fina Estampa	Vanessa	
2013	O Dentista Mascarado	Nurse	Special guest star
2013-2014	Malhação	Bárbara	
2016	Escrava Mãe	Filipa do Amaral	
2017	O Rico e Lázaro	Joana	Protagonist
2018	As Aventuras de Poliana	Luísa D'Ávila - Tia Luísa	Protagonist

=== Cinema ===
Feature-length films

Year	Title	Role	Director
2001	Memórias Póstumas	Eugênia	André Klotzel
2004	Olga	Hannah Karpow	Jayme Monjardim
2006	Anita, Amore & Storia	Anita Garibaldi	
2007	Sem Controle	Aline / Úrsula das Virgens	Cris D'Amato
2008	Inverno	Ana	Short film
2008	Damasceno e o Caixão	Rosane	Short film

=== Theater ===
Year	Play	Role	Director
2006	Jovem estudante procura	Clara	João Brandão
2009	Alguém entre nós	Bianca	Silvio Guindane
2009–2010	Vidas Divididas	Marisete	Marcos Paulo
2013	Meu Ex-Imaginário	Mara Antônia	Michel Bercovitch

== Awards ==
Year	Festival	Awards
2008	Festival de Cinema Brasileiro de Miami	Best actress for Sem Controle
2009	Festival de Cinema Internacional do Paraná	Best actress in a short movie for Inverno
