= Jayme Matarazzo =

Brazilian actor (born 1985)

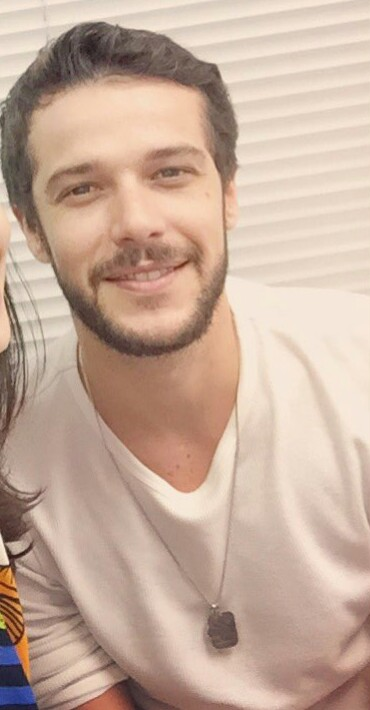
- Born: Jayme Monjardim Matarazzo Filho; November 20, 1985 (age 40); Rio de Janeiro, Brazil
- Other name: Jayminho
- Education: Fundação Armando Alvares Penteado
- Occupation: Actor
- Years active: 2009-present
- Employer: Rede Globo
- Height: 1.67 m (5 ft 5 1/2 in)
- Parent(s): Jayme Monjardim; Fernanda Lauer
- Relatives: Maysa Matarazzo (paternal grandmother)

Jayme Monjardim Matarazzo Filho (born November 20, 1985) is a Brazilian actor. He is descended from the Matarazzo Family, grandson of André and Maysa Matarazzo, and son of TV and film director Jayme Monjardim with Fernanda Lauer.

== Biography ==
Jayme Matarazzo was born in Rio de Janeiro. He moved to São Paulo aged five years old with his mother, Fernanda Lauer, and his sister, Maria Fernanda Matarazzo, where he lived until the age of 21. At 16, Jayme formed the band Seu Bené e os Poetas da Malandragem (Sir Bené and The Poets of Malandragem) with some school friends. At 20, he moved to California where lived for four months. The actor worked in a ski resort and doing shows in a casino. Upon returning to Brazil entered the film school Fundação Armando Alvares Penteado (FAAP), São Paulo, but he did not complete the course, as he moved to Rio de Janeiro to work with his father.

=== Personal life ===
Jayme had a three-year relationship with the architect Mila Barbosa. The couple broke up in September 2010.

== Career ==
At 21 years old, Jayme moved to Rio de Janeiro to work with his father as assistant director in the miniseries Maysa: Quando Fala o Coração. At that time he wanted to dedicate the same career his father's art direction. But when he was working on the miniseries, which tells the life of his paternal grandmother, had his first opportunity as an actor. Jayme represented his father when young. Given this new experience, he decided to pursue an artistic career. In 2010, he worked on the novel of Rede Globo, Escrito nas Estrelas as protagonist and in the film A Suprema Felicidade directed by Arnaldo Jabor. Jayme Matarazzo also played the young Prince Felipe in the telenovela Cordel Encantado.

== Filmography ==
=== Television ===
Year	Title	Role	Notes	Ref
2009	Maysa: Quando Fala o Coração	Jayme Monjardim (young)		
2010	Escrito nas Estrelas	Daniel Aguillar		
2010	Escrito nas Estrelas	Damián Ramírez López		
2011	Cordel Encantado	Prince Felipe		
2012	Cheias de Charme	Rodinei Maximiliano de Lima		
2013	Sangue Bom	Maurício Vasquez		
2014	Didi e o Segredo dos Anjos	Miguel		
2015	Sete Vidas	Pedro Martins Vieira		
2016	Haja Coração	Giovanni Rigoni Di Marino		
2017	Malhação: Pro Dia Nascer Feliz	Renato Dias Cordeiro		
2017	Tempo de Amar	Fernão Coelho de Abreu Moniz		
2022	Além da Ilusão	Father Tenório		
2024	Família é Tudo	Luca Baggio		

=== Film ===
Year	Title	Role	Notes	Ref
2010	A Suprema Felicidade	Paulo (young)		
2011	Soulbound	Otávio (aged 19)		

=== Music videos ===
Year	Singer/Band	Song	Notes
2010	Band Zignal	Primeira Namorada	Cecília Dassi plays his girlfriend in the video

== See also ==
- List of Brazilian actors
