= Sem Controle =

2007 film directed by Cris D'amato

- Brazilian theatrical poster
- Directed by: Cris D'amato
- Written by: Sylvio Gonçalves
- Starring: Eduardo Moscovis; Milena Toscano; Vanessa Gerbelli; Renata Batista
- Cinematography: Nonato Estrela
- Edited by: Eduardo Hartung
- Music by: Pedro Bernardes
- Production companies: Ananã Produções; Globo Filmes
- Distributed by: 20th Century Fox (Brazil); Pathfinder Pictures (USA)
- Release date: November 2, 2007
- Running time: 90 minutes
- Country: Brazil
- Language: Portuguese

Sem Controle (No Control) also known as The Last Madness, is a 2007 Brazilian drama thriller film directed by Cris D'amato and starring Eduardo Moscovis, Milena Toscano, Vanessa Gerbelli and Renata Batista. The film was screened at the Première Brasil of the 2007 Festival do Rio.

== Plot ==
Danilo is a theatre director obsessed with the injustice committed against the farmer Manoel da Motta Coqueiro, in a case that initiated the process of extinction of the death penalty in Brazil. Spurred by a mysterious, beautiful woman, Danilo begins to rehearse a play about the life of Motta Coqueiro, where he plays the farmer, and the remaining characters are experienced by psychiatric patients. Gradually Danilo begins to confuse what is real and what is imaginary, passing to relive the historical facts as if he himself were Motta Coqueiro.

== Cast ==
- Eduardo Moscovis as Danilo / Motta Coqueiro
- Milena Toscano as Aline / Úrsula das Virgens
- Vanessa Gerbelli as Dr. Márcia
- Renata Batista as Ana
- Josias Amon as Tonhão / Carlos / Tinoco
- Edmilson Barros as Edmilson / Benedito
- Mariana Bassoul as Vânia / Francisca
- Charles Fricks as André / Julião
- Cadu Fávero as Claudionor / Fernandes
- Dirce Migliaccio as Dona Iolanda
- Shimon Nahmias as Godofredo / Flor
- Igor Paiva as Otávio / Policeman
- Polyana Passos as Heloísa / Balbina
- Gláucia Rodrigues as Estela / Carolina
- Pablo Sanábio as Felipe / Fidélis / Paulinho
