= Christiana Ubach =

Brazilian actress

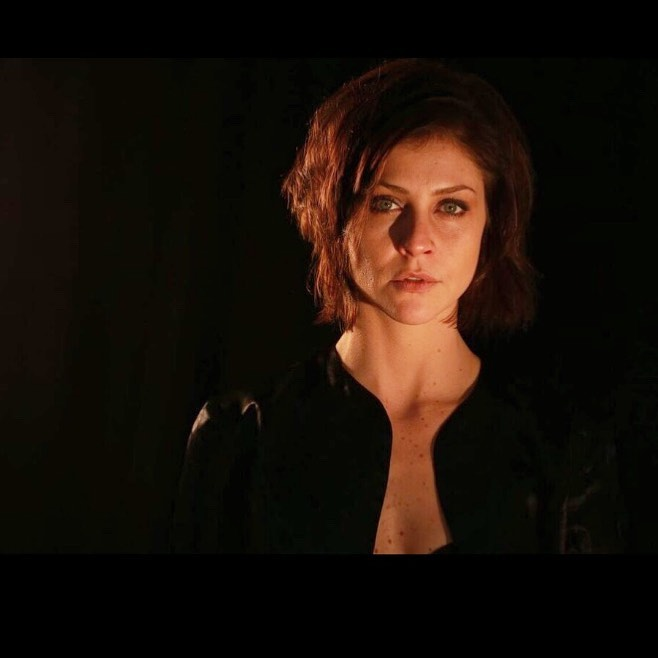
- Born: Cristiana Monteiro Peres; April 14, 1987 (age 39); Rio de Janeiro, Brazil
- Occupation: Actress
- Years active: 2008–present
- Height: 1.71 m (5 ft 7 1/2 in)

Cristiana Monteiro Peres (born April 14, 1987), known professionally as Christiana Ubach, is a Brazilian actress. She played the lead role in a telenovela.

== Biography ==
Christiana Ubach was born in Rio de Janeiro, but she moved to Itaipava, a district of Petrópolis when she was still a child. She returned to her home city when she was 14 years old to study. Christiana Ubach studied Psychology at the PUC-Rio university, but she left to study at the Oficina de Atores da Globo (Rede Globo's acting academy) to dedicate to her acting career. Her first role was the younger Flora in the 2008 telenovela A Favorita, broadcast from 2008 to 2009. She also participated in the 2008 video clip "Beijo de Cinema" by the Brazilian band Madame Machado. She was announced in late 2009 as the lead actress in Malhação ID playing the character Cristiana Araújo. She was nominated for the 12th Prêmio Contigo award in the Best Newcomer Actress category for that role. After the end of the Malhação ID season in August 2010, Christiana Ubach signed a three-year contract with Rede Globo. She played the character Nathalia in the 2010 Multishow television series Vendemos Cadeiras. Christiana Ubach played a role in the 2011 movie Faroeste Caboclo. The actress played Paula in the 2013 Rede Globo telenovela Além do Horizonte.

== Career ==
=== Television ===
Telenovelas/TV series
| Year | Title | Role |
|---|---|---|
| 2008 | A Favorita | Younger Flora |
| 2009 | Malhação ID | Cristiana Araújo (Cris) |
| 2010 | Vendemos Cadeiras | Nathalia |
| 2013 | Além do Horizonte | Paula |
| 2015 | Felizes para Sempre? | Ludmila |
| 2016 | A Garota da Moto | Joana |
| 2024 | A Infância de Romeu e Julieta | Laura |

=== Cinema ===
Movies
| Year | Title | Role |
|---|---|---|
| 2011 | Brazilian Western | |
| 2012 | Good Luck, Sweetheart | Maria |
| 2012 | Eu Não Faço a Menor Ideia do que eu Tô Fazendo Com a Minha Vida | |
| 2013 | O Lenço Manchado de Vermelho | Isabela Cobin |
| 2013 | Obra | |

== Awards and nominations ==
| Year | Award | Category | Work | Result |
| 2010 | Contigo | Best Newcomer Actress | Malhação | Nominated |
| 2010 | Capricho Awards | Favorite actress | Malhação | Nominated |
| 2010 | Meus Prêmios Nick | Couple of the year (Cristiana and Bernardo) | Malhação | Nominated |
