= Escrito nas Estrelas =

- Also known as: Written in the Stars
- Created by: Elizabeth Jhin
- Directed by: Rogério Gomes; André Binder; Fabio Strazzer; Pedro Vasconcelos; Roberta Richard
- Starring: Humberto Martins; Nathália Dill; Jayme Matarazzo; Débora Falabella; Zezé Polessa; Alexandre Nero; Cássia Kiss; Carlos Vereza; André Gonçalves; Gisele Fróes; Antonio Calloni; Carol Castro; Carolina Kasting; Giovanna Ewbank; Manuela do Monte; Jandira Martini; Marcelo Faria; Suzana Faini see more
- Opening theme: Quando a Chuva Passar by Paula Fernandes
- Country of origin: Brazil
- Original language: Portuguese
- No. of episodes: 143

Production
- Production location: Brazil
- Running time: 50 minutes

Original release
- Network: Globo
- Release: 12 April – 24 September 2010

Related
- Cama de Gato; Araguaia

Escrito nas Estrelas (English: Written in the Stars) is a Brazilian telenovela produced and aired by Globo from April 12 to September 24, 2010.

== Synopsis ==
Doctor Ricardo Aguillar (Humberto Martins), a widower for ten years, is a renowned physician who owns an assisted reproduction clinic and truly adores his only son, Daniel (Jayme Matarazzo), who is a medical student. The two love each other deeply, but have opposing ideals and temperaments, which causes friction between father and son.

However, a tragedy shakes Ricardo convictions: Daniel dies prematurely in an accident. After some time, the doctor discovers that his son had frozen his semen before he died. From then on, Ricardo begins a tireless search for the "ideal woman", worthy of being inseminated and becoming the mother of his grandson. But fate is about to play a trick on him.

The chosen young woman is the humble and hard-working Viviane (Nathalia Dill), who had met Daniel shortly before he died. The two lived a brief but deep passion. Daniel still enchants Viviane, involving her in the dreams in which he appears to her. Ricardo closeness to the young woman, without knowing that she was his son's beloved, ends up awakening a new feeling in the doctor, who falls in love with her.

From then on, an unusual and surprising situation arises: Daniel spirit begins to haunt the family and, despite being on different planes, father and son will fight for the love of the same woman. Thus, unexpectedly, Viviane appears in the life of father and son, triggering a series of conflicts and a love that transcends the limits of human life.

== Cast ==
Actor/Actress	Character
Humberto Martins	Ricardo Aguillar / Cassiano
Nathalia Dill	Viviane Ferreira Aguillar / Vitória / Valentina
Jayme Matarazzo	Daniel Aguillar / Damian
Alexandre Nero	Gilmar de Almeida
Débora Falabella	Beatriz Cristina Tavares
Zezé Polessa	Sofia Tavares de Miranda (Sofia Loren)
Antonio Calloni	Vicente de Miranda / Esteban López
Cássia Kiss	Francisca Aguillar
Carol Castro	Mariana
Marcelo Faria	Dr. Guilherme
Carolina Kasting	Judite
Gisele Fróes	Dra. Jane
Manuela do Monte	Luciana
Giovanna Ewbank	Suely
Suzana Faini	Antonia
Jandira Martini	Gildete Salmon (Madame Gilda)
Walderez de Barros	Zenilda Salmon
André Gonçalves	Jair Pereira
Carlos Vereza	Anjo Athael
Marina Ruy Barbosa	Vanessa
Othon Bastos	Constantino (Velho)
Bel Kutner	Virgínia
Celso Frateschi	Jardel
Murilo Grossi	Jofre Ferreira (Gentil Nogueira)
José Rubens Chachá	Jovenil
Nica Bonfim	Magali
Ana Paula Bouzas	Fabiana Pereira
Paulo Vilela	Breno
Alexandre Rodrigues	Seth
Rosane Gofman	Mundinha
Thelma Reston	Etelvina Conceição
Cacá Amaral	José
Ary França	Seu Filhinho (Valdemar da Conceição Filho)
Larissa Biondo	Michelle
Lucci Ferreira	Afonso
Cláudio Galvan	Calixto
Bia Sion	Rute
Izak Dahora	Alex
Simone Soares	Fernanda
Maria Clara Mattos	Leninha
Rosana Dias	Sandra
Pia Manfroni	Dalva
Paula Tolentino	Yasmin
Lincoln Tornado	Ezequiel
Isabela Meirelles	Mônica
Gilberto Torres	Mateus
Ewe Pamplona	Hilda
Eduardo Mancini	Manoel
Daniela Fontan	Berenice
Cristina Amadeo	Danusa
Bruno Pereira	Mauro
Marcela Tinti	Vitória
José Bittencourt	Dentinho
Matheus Costa	Tadeu
Yago Machado	Huguinho
João Victor Granja	Zezinho
João Fernandes	Luizinho
Anna Rita Cerqueira	Clara
Luisa Gonzalez	Laura

== International broadcasts ==
Country	Alternate Title/Translation	TV Network(s)	Series Premiere	Series Finale	Weekly Schedule	Hour
Brazil	Escrito nas Estrelas	TV Globo	April 12, 2010	September 24, 2010	Monday to Saturday	18:10
Portugal	Escrito nas Estrelas	SIC	October 11, 2010	April 21, 2011	Monday to Friday	19:15
Canada	Escrito nas Estrelas	OMNI-1 Television	April 25, 2011	September 23, 2011	Monday to Friday	16:00
Costa Rica	Escrito en las Estrellas	Teletica Canal 7	July 11, 2011	December 1, 2011	Monday to Friday	13:30
Chile	Escrito en las Estrellas	Canal 13	July 25, 2011	October 7, 2011	Monday to Friday	14:30
Nicaragua	Escrito en las Estrellas	Televicentro	October 11, 2011	March 2, 2012	Monday to Friday	17:00
El Salvador	Escrito en las Estrellas	TCS Canal 4	December 27, 2011	June 29, 2012	Monday to Friday	13:00
Argentina	Escrito en las Estrellas	Canal 9 Televida	March 22, 2012	August 16, 2012	Monday to Friday	15:00
Uruguay	Escrito en las Estrellas	Teledoce	June 13, 2012	November 6, 2012	Monday to Friday	18:00
Mozambique	Escrito nas Estrelas	TVM1	October 12, 2012	March 25, 2013	Monday to Saturday	21:00
Macau	Escrito nas Estrelas	Canal Macau	January 2, 2013	July 22, 2013	Monday to Friday	22:00
South Korea	아들의 여자	텔레노벨라	January 15, 2014	TBA	Wednesday	20:00
United States	Escrito en las Estrellas	Mega TV	September 26, 2012	February 20, 2013	Monday to Friday	20:00
United States	Escrito en las Estrellas	Telemundo	May 19, 2014	TBA	Monday to Friday	12:00
Ecuador	Escrito en las Estrellas	Ecuavisa	2013	2013	Monday to Friday	02:30 (Costa) 04:00 (Inter)

== Soundtrack ==
1. "Quando a Chuva Passar" – Paula Fernandes
2. "Eternamente" – Gal Costa
3. "Ela Só Pensa em Beijar (Se Ela Dança, Eu Danço)" – Celso Fonseca
4. "Pai" – Fábio Júnior
5. "Roda Gigante II" – Marcelo Mira
6. "Ela Briga Comigo" – Moinho
7. "Mamãe Passou Açúcar em Mim (ao vivo)" - Mart'nália
8. "Deixa Eu Te Amar" (ao Vivo) - Diogo Nogueira
9. "Para de Paradinha" – Arlindo Cruz
10. "Nossa História" – Lorena Chaves
11. "Erva Venenosa (Poison Ivy)" – Rita Lee
12. "Coração de Papel" – Zé Renato
13. "Quem Tome Conta de Mim (Someone To Watch Over Me)" – Paula Toller
14. "Gente Humilde" – Luiza Possi

And also

- "Angel" - Katherine Jenkins
- "Billionaire" - Travie McCoy ft. Bruno Mars
- "Fly to the moon" - The Parlotones
- "If We Were" - Belinda
- "Someone To Watch Over Me" - Bia Son
- "Postcard" - Lu Alone
- "Can't Take My Eyes of You" - Barbara Mendes

== Awards and nominations ==
Year	Award	Category	Nominated	Result
2010	Prêmio TV Press	Best Creator	Elizabeth Jhin	Won
2010	Prêmio TV Press	Best Actress	Nathalia Dill	Won
2010	Prêmio Jovem Brasileiro	Best Actress	Nathalia Dill	Won
2010	Prêmio Extra de Televisão	Best Actress	Nathalia Dill	Won
2010	Prêmio Arte Qualidade Brasil	Best Supporting Actor	Alexandre Nero	Won
2010	Premio Tudo De Bom - Jornal O Dia	Muse	Giovanna Ewbank	Won
2010	Prêmio Contigo! de Televisão	Best Child Actor	Matheus Costa	Won
2011	Melhores do Ano	Best Actress	Nathalia Dill	Nominated
