= Olga (2004 film) =

2004 film by Jayme Monjardim

- Theatrical release poster
- Directed by: Jayme Monjardim
- Screenplay by: Rita Buzzar
- Based on: Olga by Fernando Morais
- Produced by: Rita Buzzar
- Starring: Camila Morgado; Caco Ciocler; Fernanda Montenegro
- Cinematography: Ricardo Della Rosa
- Edited by: Pedro Amorim
- Music by: Marcus Viana
- Production companies: Nexus Cinema; Globo Filmes; Lumière
- Distributed by: Europa Filmes
- Release date: 20 August 2004 (Brazil)
- Running time: 141 minutes
- Country: Brazil
- Language: Portuguese
- Budget: R$ 12 million

Olga is a 2004 Brazilian biographical drama film directed by Jayme Monjardim from a screenplay by Rita Buzzar, based on the 1985 biography of the same name by Fernando Morais. It was Brazil's submission to the 77th Academy Awards for the Academy Award for Best Foreign Language Film, but was not accepted as a nominee.

The film was a produced by Nexus Cinema in conjunction with Globo Filmes and Lumiere. Olga was seen by over three million viewers and won more than 20 awards in Brazil and internationally. It is one of several Brazilian films to treat Jewish themes.

== Plot ==
Olga is the feature-film chronicle of the German Jew Olga Benário Prestes' (1908–1942) life and times. A communist activist since her youth, Olga is persecuted by the police and flees to Moscow, where she undergoes military training. She is put in charge of escorting Luís Carlos Prestes to Brazil to lead the Communist Uprising of 1935, falling in love with him along the way.

With the failure of the uprising, Olga is arrested alongside Prestes. Seven-month pregnant Olga is extradited by President Vargas' Government to Nazi Germany, where she gives birth to her daughter Anita Leocádia while incarcerated. Separated from her daughter, Olga is sent away to the Ravensbrück concentration camp, where she is executed in the gas chamber.

== Cast ==
- Camila Morgado as Olga Benário Prestes
  - Isabela Coimbra as young Olga Benário
- Renata Jesion as Elise Ewert Sabo
- Caco Ciocler as Luís Carlos Prestes
- Osmar Prado as Getúlio Vargas
- Floriano Peixoto as Filinto Müller
- Fernanda Montenegro as Dona Leocádia Prestes
- Luís Melo as Léo Benário
- Anderson Müller as Paul Gruber
- Murilo Rosa as Estevan
- Werner Schünemann as Arthur Ewert
- Guilherme Weber as Otto Braun
- Mariana Lima as Lígia Prestes
- Eliane Giardini as Eugénie Benário
- Jandira Martini as Sarah
- Milena Toscano as Hannah
- Klaus Couto as Adolf Hitler
- Odilon Wagner as ship captain
- Eliana Guttman as chief nurse
- Ranieri Gonzalez as Miranda
- Raul Serrador as Rodolfo Ghioldi
- Bruno Dayrrel as Victor Barron
- Gilles Gwizdek as Leon Julles Valee
- Hélio Ribeiro as Father Leopoldo
- Edgard Amorim as Agildo Barata
- Zé Carlos Machado as Minister of War
- José Dumont as Manuel
- Pascoal da Conceição as Dimitri Manuilski
- Sabrina Greve as Elza Colônio
- Maria Clara Fernandes as Carmem
- Leona Cavalli as Maria
- Eduardo Semerjian as Galvão
- Thelmo Fernandes as Bangu
- Tadeu di Pietro as judge
- Ricardo Rathsam as German young man

== Awards ==
- Cinema Brazil Grand Prize 2005: Best Art Direction (Tiza Oliveira), Best Costume Design (Paulo Lóes) and Best Make-up (Marlene Moura).
- Havana Film Festival 2005: Audience Award.
- ABC Cinematography Award 2005: Best Art Direction (Tiza Oliveira) and Best Cinematography (Ricardo Della Rosa).
- Atlanta Jewish Film Festival 2007: Audience Award, Best narrative Film.
- Washington Film Festival 2005: Best Film.
- Viña Del Mar Film Festival 2005: Best Film, Best Direction (Jayme Monjardim) and Best Actress (Camila Morgado).

== See also ==
- List of submissions to the 77th Academy Awards for Best Foreign Language Film
- List of Brazilian submissions for the Academy Award for Best Foreign Language Film
