= Flor do Caribe =

- Genre: Telenovela; Romance; Drama; Adventure
- Created by: Walther Negrão
- Directed by: Jayme Monjardim; Leonardo Nogueira
- Starring: Grazi Massafera; Henri Castelli; Igor Rickli; Sérgio Mamberti; Cláudia Netto; Jean Pierre Noher; Raphael Viana; Daniela Escobar; Max Fercondini; Bruno Gissoni; José Loreto; Débora Nascimento; Ângela Vieira; Juca de Oliveira see more
- Opening theme: Em Paz by Maria Gadú
- Country of origin: Brazil
- Original language: Portuguese
- No. of episodes: 159 / 120 (Syndication)

Production
- Running time: approx. 50 minutes

Original release
- Network: TV Globo
- Release: 11 March – 13 September 2013

Flor do Caribe (English: Caribbean Flower) is a Brazilian telenovela produced and broadcast by TV Globo originally ran from March 11 to September 19, 2013.

== Plot ==
Cassiano (Henri Castelli), an air force pilot, and Ester (Grazi Massafera), a tourist guide, fall madly in love at a young age. Their love grows throughout the years until they fall victim to a treacherous plot carried out by Alberto (Igor Rickli). This unscrupulous friend, who secretly loves the young woman, creates a plan to get rid of his rival. After being assigned by Alberto to deliver diamonds in the Caribbean, Cassiano suddenly disappears and is presumed dead. While Cassiano falls prey to dangerous Dom Rafael, Alberto takes the opportunity to comfort Ester and, fulfilling his evil plan, they marry.

Cassiano, who remained in captivity for years, manages to escape with the help of a fellow prisoner named Duque and, pretending to be a tourist, reaches Brazil. Now he wants to square accounts with his former friend and reclaim Ester's love.

== Cast ==
Actor/Actress	Character
Grazi Massafera	Ester Schneider
Henri Castelli	Cassiano Soares
Igor Rickli	Alberto Alburquerque
Cláudia Netto	Guiomar Mourão Albuquerque
Sérgio Mamberti	Dionísio Albuquerque (Klaus Wagner)
Juca de Oliveira	Samuel Achcar Schneider
Débora Nascimento	Taís Soares
Raphael Viana	Hélio da Silva
Daniela Escobar	Natália Fonseca
Bruno Gissoni	Juliano Pereira
Ângela Vieira	Lindaura Schneider
Laura Cardoso	Veridiana Trindade
José Loreto	Francisco Cândido Trindade (Candinho)
Jean Pierre Noher	Duque (Duque de Charllain)
Sthefany Brito	Amaralina (Edwiges Cristina)
Thaíssa Carvalho	Isabel
Dudu Azevedo	Amadeu
Tainá Müller	Ludmilla Fonseca (Milla)
Maria Joana Chiapetta	Maria Carolina Fonseca (Carol)
Thiago Martins	Rodrigo
Max Fercondini	Ciro
Bete Mendes	Olívia Soares
Rita Guedes	Doralice
Aílton Graça	Quirino Pereira
Luiz Carlos Vasconcelos	Donato da Silva
Cyria Coentro	Bibiana (Beatriz da Silva)
Marcos Winter	Reynaldo Fonseca
Moro Anghileri	Cristal
César Troncoso	(Dom) Rafael Hernandez Bonilla
Licurgo Spinola	Comandante Franco Mantovani
Cacá Amaral	Seu Chico (Francisco Soares)
José Henrique Ligabue	Virgulino Trindade (Lino)
Patrícia Naves	Yvete Macedo
Gisele Alves	Zuleika
Cinara Leal	Nicole
Renata Roberta	Dadá
Rafael Almeida	Paçoquinha
Viviane Victorette	Marinalva
Fernanda Pontes	Vanessa
Martha Nieto	Amparo
Livian Aragão	Marizé da Silva
Mariza Marchetti	Drª Márcia
Sabrina Petraglia	Simone
Gésio Amadeu	Alaor
Igor Cotrim	Diego
Josie Pessôa	Kátia
Vitor Figueiredo	Samuca (Samuel Schneider Suarez)
Renzo Aprouch	William
Pablo Mothé	Felipe da Silva (Lipe)
Serena e Vitoria Lovatel	Laurinha (Laura Schneider Albuquerque)
Jonas Mello	Arruda
Suzana Pires	Safira
Suzana Pires	Aurora
Elias Gleizer	Manolo
Mariana Anghileri	Cristal

== International broadcasts ==
In Brazil, it was aired in Access primetime, and averaged 25 audience rating points and 50% of share. In Portugal, it aired on Globo's basic channel and had the best premiere of a telenovela broadcast on pay-TV in the country recently. 'Caribbean Flower' has also been licensed to South Korea (EPG), Peru (ATV), Uruguay (Teledoce), Chile (Canal 13), and Argentina (Telefe), among other countries.

Country	Channel	Title	Premiere	End	Weekly Schedule	Hour
(Brazil)	TV Globo	Flor do Caribe	March 11, 2013	September 13, 2013	Monday to Saturday	18:20
(São Tomé and Príncipe)	TVS	Flor do Caribe	March 18, 2013	September 20, 2013	Monday to Sunday	20:00
(Portugal)	SIC	Flor do Caribe	May 19, 2014	September 14, 2014	Monday to Sunday	20:00
(Peru)	ATV	Flor del Caribe	May 19, 2014	October 31, 2014	Monday to Friday	22:00
(Uruguay)	Teledoce	Flor del Caribe	August 4, 2014	January 22, 2015	Monday to Friday	19:00^{1}
(Paraguay)	SNT	Flor del Caribe	September 2, 2014	February 17, 2015	Monday to Friday	22:00
(Hungary)	RTL2	Karibi Szerelem	September 8, 2014	February 20, 2015	Monday to Friday	14:40
(Argentina)	Telefe	Flor del Caribe	September 30, 2014	January 5, 2015	Monday to Friday	16:30
(Guatemala)	Guatevisión	Flor del Caribe	October 13, 2014	present	Monday to Friday	19:00
(Costa Rica)	Teletica	Flor del Caribe	October 20, 2014	present	Monday to Friday	11:00
(El Salvador)	TCS Canal 4	Flor del Caribe	October 20, 2014	present	Monday to Friday	13:00
(South Korea)	Telenovela	캐리비안 플라워	November 17, 2014	present	Monday	16:00^{2}
(Chile)	Canal 13	Flor del Caribe	November 26, 2014	present	Monday to Friday	15:00^{3}
(Romania)	Acasă	Floarea din Caraibe	July 16, 2015	present	Monday to Sunday	22:00
(Portugal)	RTP Internacional	Flor do Caribe	July 20, 2015	present	Monday to Sunday	22:00
(Nicaragua)	Televicentro	Flor del Caribe	Coming Soon			
(Dominican Republic)	Tele Antillas	Flor del Caribe	Coming Soon			
(Honduras)	VTV	Flor del Caribe	Coming Soon			
(Ecuador)	Ecuavisa	Flor del Caribe	Coming Soon			
(Armenia)	Armenia TV		Coming Soon			
(Czech Republic)	TV Barrandov		Coming Soon			

^1 Aired between October 20 and October 23 in chapters of 30 minutes.

^2 Aired 2 episodes per day.

^3 Aired changed timeslot at 3:00pm since December 1, 2014.
