= Gonzaga — de Pai pra Filho =

- Directed by: Breno Silveira
- Written by: Patrícia Andrade
- Produced by: Cibele Santa Cruz Conspiração Filmes
- Production company: Globo Filmes
- Distributed by: Warner Bros. Pictures Downtown Filmes
- Release date: 26 October 2012 (Brazil)
- Country: Brazil
- Language: Portuguese

Gonzaga — de Pai pra Filho is a 2012 Brazilian drama film directed by Breno Silveira, written by Patricia Andrade, and starring Chambinho do Acordeon and Júlio Andrade. Inspired by the life of musicians Luiz Gonzaga and Gonzaguinha, father and son respectively, the feature was released in Brazil on October 26, 2012, and was broadcast by Rede Globo in a microseries format between January 17 and 20, 2013, in 4 chapters.

== Cast ==
- Chambinho do Acordeon as Luiz Gonzaga
  - Land Vieira as Luiz Gonzaga (young)
  - Adelio Lima as Luiz Gonzaga (old)
- Júlio Andrade as Gonzaguinha
  - Giancarlo Di Tommaso as Gonzaguinha (young)
- Nanda Costa as Odaleia
- Magdale Alves as Helena
- Roberta Gualda as Helena (young)
- Anna Aguiar as Nazinha Deolindo
- Cecília Dassi as Nazinha Deolindo (young)
- Domingos Montagner as Coronel Raimundo Deolindo
- Sílvia Buarque as Dina Pinheiro
- Luciano Quirino as Xavier Pinheiro
- Claudio Jaborandy as Januário Gonzaga
- Cyria Coentro as Santana Gonzaga
- Zezé Motta as Priscila
- Olívia Araújo as Priscila (young)
- João Miguel as Miguelzinho
- Lulu Santos as Salário Mínimo
- Armando Bógus as Coronel Silveira
- Xandó Graça as Sargento Loyola
- Thalma de Freitas as Dancing singer
