= O Rico e Lázaro =

- Genre: Telenovela
- Created by: Paula Richard
- Written by: Cristianne Fridman; Camilo Pellegrini; Joaquim Assis
- Starring: Milena Toscano; Dudu Azevedo; Igor Rickli; Christine Fernandes; Adriana Garambone; Heitor Martinez; Denise Del Vecchio; Lucinha Lins; Paulo Figueiredo; Cássio Scapin; Gabriel Gracindo
- Opening theme: "Ricopen" by Daniel Figueiredo
- Country of origin: Brazil
- Original language: Portuguese
- No. of episodes: 181

Production
- Production locations: Rio de Janeiro, Brazil
- Camera setup: Multi-camera
- Production company: Casablanca

Original release
- Network: RecordTV
- Release: March 23 – November 20, 2017

O Rico e Lázaro (English: The Rich and Lazarus) is a Brazilian telenovela produced by Casablanca and broadcast by RecordTV. Created by Paula Richard. It premiered on March 23, 2017 and ended on November 20, 2017. It stars Milena Toscano, Dudu Azevedo, and Igor Rickli.

The telenovela tells the story of the parable of Rich man and Lazarus, taking place during the time of Babylonian Captivity.

== Plot ==
After the death of Joshua, the Hebrew people begin to "go their own way", turning their backs on God and beginning to worship pagan gods. But when the prophet Jeremiah tries to warn them, his own people try to stone him, calling him a traitor and false prophet. However, his prophecy is fulfilled with the arrival of King Nebuchadnezzar II and his wife Queen Amytis of Babylon: the Babylonian army conquers the Kingdom of Judah, and its people are taken into exile. In another part of the story, the love triangle involving childhood friends Asher, Joana, and Zac is explored. As the trio become adults, Asher and Zac both fall in love with Joana, but she reciprocates only to Asher.

== Cast ==
- Milena Toscano as Joana
- Dudu Azevedo as Lazarus/Asher
- Igor Rickli as Zac
- Christine Fernandes as Sammu-Ramat
- Sthefany Brito as Nitocris
- Ângelo Paes Leme as Nebuzaradã
- Adriana Garambone as Amytis
- Heitor Martinez as Nebuchadnezzar II
- Denise Del Vecchio as Elga
- Lucinha Lins as Zelfa
- Paulo Figueiredo as Zadoque
- Zé Carlos Machado as Fassur
- Vera Zimmermann as Neusta
- Cássio Scapin as Berossus
- Gabriel Gracindo as Daniel
- Roger Gobeth as Absalom
- Gabriela Moreyra as Shamiran
- Cássia Linhares as Shag-Shag
- Tammy di Calafiori as Lia
- Marcos Breda as Ravina
- Claudia Mauro as Ilana
- Pérola Faria as Kassaia
- Henri Pagnoncelli as Chaim
- Osmar Silveira as Jehoiachin
- Augusto Garcia as Nabonidus
- Kayky Brito as Amel-Marduk
- Anderson Müller as Tamir
- Renato Rabello as Shamir
- Michelle Batista as Talita
- Giselle Batista as Samira
- Gustavo Leão as Rabe-Sáris
- Felipe Cardoso as Arioch
- Bruna Pazinato as Rebeca
- Graziella Schmitt as Dana
- Sacha Bali as Meshach
- Licurgo Spínola as Ezekiel
- Aisha Jambo as Gadise
- Gustavo Rodrigues as Shadrach
- Rafael Almeida as Hurzabum
- Guilherme Seta as Hurzabum child
- Robertha Portella as Edissa
- André Luiz Miranda as Ebede-Meleque
- Eduardo Melo as Lior
- Karen Marinho as Naomi
- Juliana Kelling as Dalila
- Mariza Marchetti as Malca
- Fernando Sampaio as Matias
- Raphael Montagner as Nicolau
- Paula Jubé as Raquel
- Ricardo Martins as Larsa
- Keff Oliveira as Anjo Gabriel
- Nikolas Antunes as Abednego
- Ana Zettel as Darice
- João Velho as Madai
- Paulo Leal as Rafael
- Karla Tenório as Jade
- Rafaela Ferreira as Hayddé
- César Pezzuoli as Zabaia
- Ed Oliveira as Rato
- Pedro Malta as Tamuz
- Fran Fischer as Namnu
- Saulo Meneghetti as Oziel
- Saulo Rodrigues as Aspenaz
- Edson Fieschi as Erom
- Thogun Teixeira as Sargão
- Marcelo Arnal as Belshazzar
- Rafael Awi as Benjamin
- Breno di Filippo as Rei Dario
- Ana Paula Lima as Yasha
- Alex Brasil as Aksumai
- William Amaral as Joel
- Tião D'Ávila as Aliatis
- Rafael Sieg as Levi
- Karize Brum as Kidist

== Ratings ==
Season	Timeslot (BRT/AMT)	Episodes	First aired		Last aired	
Season	Timeslot (BRT/AMT)	Episodes	Date	Viewers (in points)	Date	Viewers (in points)
1	Mon–Fri 8:45pm	181	March 13, 2017	15	November 20, 2017	12
