= Jandira Martini =

Brazilian actress (1945–2024)

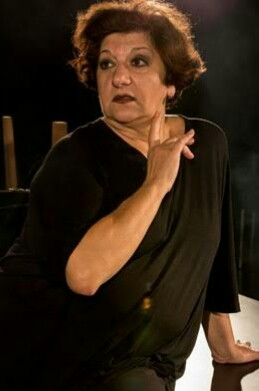
- Born: Jandira Lúcia Lalia Martini; 10 June 1945; Santos, São Paulo, Brazil
- Died: 29 January 2024 (aged 78); São Paulo
- Occupations: Actress, author

Jandira Lúcia Lalia Martini (10 June 1945 – 29 January 2024) was a Brazilian actress and author of theatre and screenplays. Martini was born on 10 June 1945, and died from lung cancer on 29 January 2024, at the age of 78.

== Filmography ==
=== Television ===
- 1983 – Braço de Ferro
- 1987 – Sassaricando – Teodora Abdalla
- 1990 – A História de Ana Raio e Zé Trovão – Vitória Imperial
- 1991 – O Fantasma da Ópera – Marion Leik Fitzgerald
- 1994 – Éramos Seis – Dona Genu
- 1995 – Sangue do Meu Sangue – Rebeca
- 1996 – Brava Gente – Augusta Messinari
- 2001 – Os Maias – Eugênia Silveira
- 2001 – O Clone – Zoraide
- 2003 – A Casa das Sete Mulheres – Dona Antônia
- 2004 – A Diarista – Dilma (episode: Aquele com os Loucos)
- 2005 – América – Odaléia de Oliveira
- 2007 – Amazônia, de Galvez a Chico Mendes – Donana
- 2007 – Desejo Proibido – Dona Guará
- 2009 – Caminho das Índias – Puja
- 2010 – Escrito nas Estrelas – Gildete (Madame Gilda)
- 2011 – Morde & Assopra – Salomé de Souza
- 2012 – Salve Jorge – Farid

=== Film ===
- 1990 – Uma Escola Atrapalhada – Dona Alma
- 2004 – Olga – Sara
