= Ana Néri =

Brazilian nurse (1814–1880)

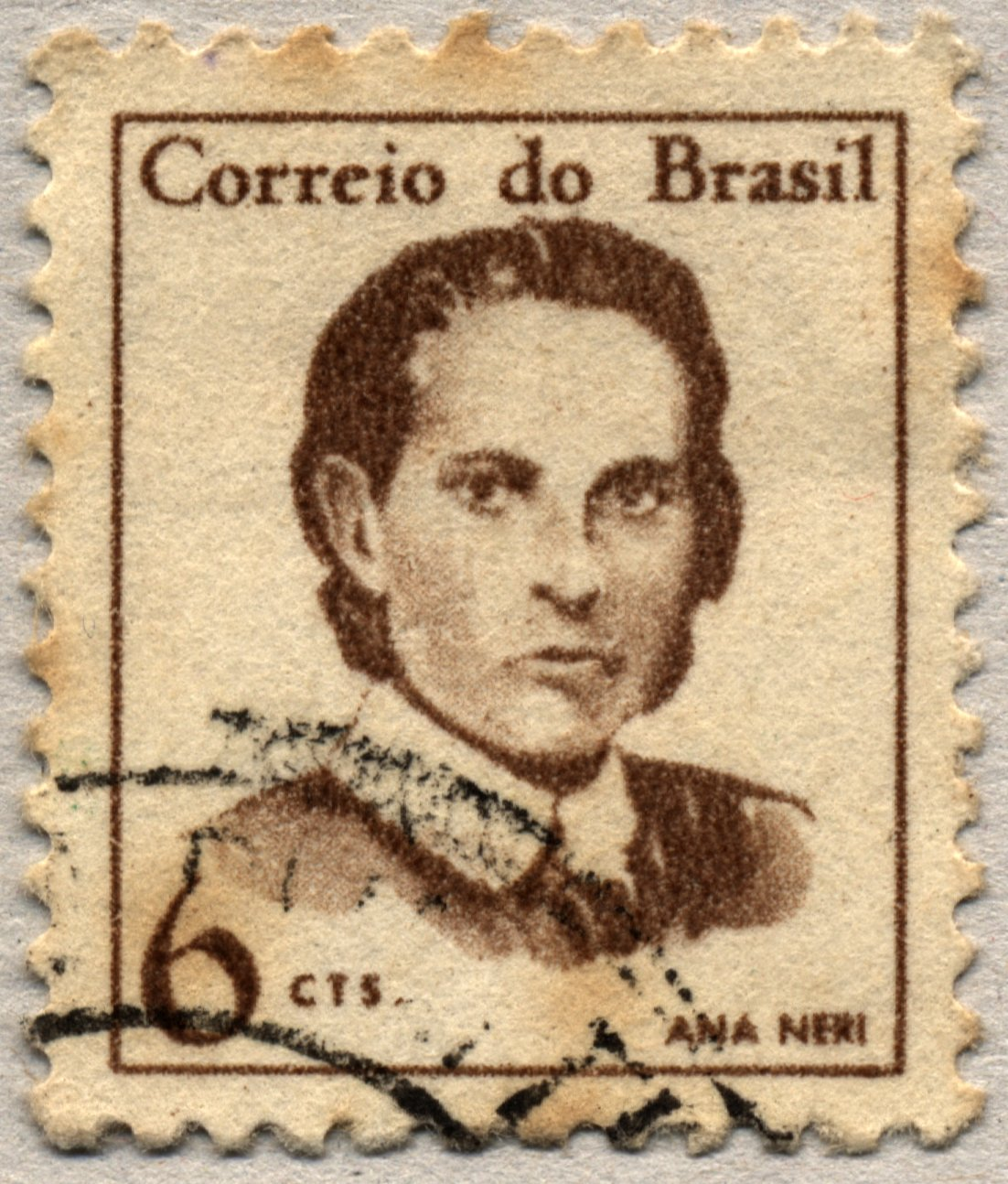
- A stamp of Ana Néri
- Born: 13 December 1814; Cachoeira de Paraguaçu, Bahia, State of Brazil, Portuguese Empire
- Died: 20 May 1880 (aged 65); Rio de Janeiro, Empire of Brazil
- Other name: Anna Nery
- Occupation: Nurse
- Known for: Introduction of modern nursing in Brazil
- Spouse: Commander Isidoro Antônio Néri (1837–1843)
- Children: Justiniano, Isidoro Antônio Filho, and Pedro Antônio

Ana Justina Ferreira Néri (13 December 1814 – 20 May 1880) was a Brazilian nurse, considered the first in her country. She is best known for her volunteer work with the Triple Alliance during the Paraguayan War.

== Biography ==
Néri was born in the Bahian village of Cachoeira de Paraguaçu to José Ferreira de Jesus and his wife, Luísa Maria das Virgens. At age 23, Ana married Navy Commander Isidoro Antônio Néri. With her husband always on duty, Ana became accustomed with running their house on her own. She became a widow at age 29, having to take care of their children Justiniano, Isidoro, and Pedro Antônio by herself. Justiniano and Isidoro became doctors, while Pedro Antônio joined the Army, becoming a cadet.

=== Work as a nurse ===
In 1865, Brazil joined the Triple Alliance in the Paraguayan War, and Ana's sons were all called upon duty, in addition to both her brothers, Manuel Jerônimo, and Joaquim Maurício. Unhappy with the fact that she would stay away from all the men in her family, she wrote a letter to Manuel Pinho de Sousa Dantas, governor of Bahia, offering to take care of injured soldiers of the Triple Alliance for the duration of the conflict.

Later that year, Ana left Bahia for the first time in her life, assisting the Army's health corps, which was small and had few supplies. She started working alongside Vincentian nuns in a hospital in Corrientes, where she would take care of more than 6,000 hospitalized soldiers. Not a long time later, she assisted the injured in Salto, Humaitá, Curupaiti, and Asunción.

A wealthy woman, Ana founded a nursing house in the Paraguayan capital, then occupied and besieged by the Brazilian Army. For that purpose, she used personal financial resources that she inherited from her family. She worked selflessly there until the end of the war. Her son Justiniano and a nephew who had enlisted as a volunteer both died in battle.

At the end of the war, in 1870, Ana returned to Brazil and received several honours, among them the distinctions of silver and humanitarian campaign medals. Emperor Pedro II granted Ana, via decree, a lifelong pension, which she used to provide education for the four orphans that she had brought from Paraguay with her.

=== Death and homages ===
Ana died on 20 May 1880, in Rio de Janeiro. In 1926, Carlos Chagas named the first official Brazilian school of nursing after her. Her full-body portrait, painted by Victor Meirelles, currently occupies a place of honor at the Salvador City Hall. According to the federal law number 12.105, sanctioned by acting president José Alencar on 2 December 2009, Ana Néri is now a character of the Book of the Fatherland Heroes, and will have her name added in the Pantheon of the Fatherland and Freedom, a monument in Brasília consisting of a steel book designed by Oscar Niemeyer.

She was portrayed by Cyria Coentro in the 2021 Brazilian historical telenovela Nos Tempos do Imperador.
