= Igor Rickli =

Brazilian actor (born 1983)

- Born: Igor Rickli Christóforo; 14 December 1983 (age 42); Ponta Grossa, Paraná, Brazil
- Occupation: Actor
- Years active: 2010–present
- Spouse: Aline Wirley (m. 2015)
- Children: 1

Igor Rickli Christóforo (born 14 December 1983) is a Brazilian actor.

== Biography ==
Rickli was born in Ponta Grossa, Paraná. He is of Italian and Swiss descent. He is openly bisexual.

== Career ==
He started playing theater as a child at the age of six in the church his family attended, and as a teenager he began to produce his own spectacles until at eighteen he decided to become a professional. In the beginning he was taken to live in São Paulo by Ney Alves, current booker of Major Model Brazil to continue his modeling career. On the occasion Igor lived in the house of Ney, in the capital of São Paulo, who saw in the young man a lot of talent for the artistic medium. It was on this occasion that Igor left Ponta Grossa for the first time in search of success in the artistic world.

In 2006, he moved to Rio de Janeiro in search of the dream of becoming an actor and in 2010 he debuts as the protagonist Berger in the HAIR show, the following year he played Mick Deans in Judy Garland, in over the rainbow and Bolivar, in the film Time and the Wind.

In 2013, he makes his television debut in the soap opera Flor do Caribe, as the villain Alberto Albuquerque. In 2014 he was present in Alto Astral in the role of Mohammed. In March 2016, he signed a contract with Rede Record to participate in the novel A Terra Prometida.

== Filmography ==
Television
Year	Title	Character	Note
2010	A Vida Alheia	Amadeu	
2013	Flor do Caribe	Alberto Alburquerque	
2015	Alto Astral	Mohammed Abdullah Al Masi	
2016	A Terra Prometida	Marek	
2017	O Rico e Lázaro	Zac	
2017	Apocalipse	Benjamin Gudman	
2021	Gênesis	Lucifer	
2026	Quem Ama Cuida	Patrick	
Film
Year	Title	Character	Note
2013	Time and the Wind	Bolívar	
Stage
Year	Title	Character	Note
2010	Hair	Berger	
2011	Judy Garland - O Fim do Arco-Íris	Mickey Deans	Team play with Cláudia Netto and Gracindo Júnior
2024	É O Amor	Himself	

== Personal life ==
He married in 2010 to singer and actress Aline Wirley, a former member of the Rouge group. Together they have a son, Antônio, born in September 2014.
