= Escrava Mãe =

- Genre: Telenovela
- Created by: Gustavo Reiz
- Written by: Gustavo Reiz
- Directed by: Ivan Zettel
- Starring: Zezé Motta; Roberta Gualda; Léo Rosa; Milena Toscano; Lidi Lisboa; Thaís Fersoza
- Opening theme: "Anos Solidões" by Lulli Chiaro
- Country of origin: Brazil
- Original language: Portuguese
- No. of episodes: 159

Production
- Production location: Paulínia
- Camera setup: Multi-camera
- Production company: Casablanca

Original release
- Network: RecordTV
- Release: May 31, 2016 – January 9, 2017

Related
- A Escrava Isaura

Escrava Mãe (English: The Slave Mother) is a Brazilian telenovela produced by Casablanca for RecordTV. Created by Gustavo Reiz and directed by Ivan Zettel. It premiered on May 31, 2016, and ended on January 9, 2017, replaced by the rerun of A Escrava Isaura. It stars Fernando Pavão, Roberta Gualda, Léo Rosa, Milena Toscano, Lidi Lisboa and Thaís Fersoza.

The telenovela tells the story of Juliana, the daughter of a slave brought from Africa and raped by a slave trader, who ends up in the Engenho do Sol after the death of her mother and lives under the love and hatred of the Avelar sisters. Pedro Carvalho plays the Portuguese Miguel, who comes to Brazil to seek answers about the mysterious death of his parents and falls in love with Juliana, having to overcome her fear of white men.

The plot won the Seoul International Drama Awards in the Serial-Drama Category.

== Plot ==
The story begins in 1788 in Congo, Africa. A tribe of Khoisans is invaded by white men, who imprison the natives and take them to Brazil on a slave ship, where they will be sold as slaves. During the trip, Luena is raped by the trafficker Osório, giving birth to Juliana and dying after childbirth. Juliana ends up in Engenho do Sol, in the village of São Salvador, where she is raised by Tia Joaquina and becomes a maid of the Avelar family, being protected by them, which generates the hatred of Esmeria, slave who never received the same privileges. After 20 years, Juliana's relationship with the two heiresses of the sugar mill is completely different: while she is taken as a friend and confidant by Teresa, her younger daughter is also treated with contempt by Maria Isabel, the merciless eldest daughter. The life of Juliana changes with the arrival of Miguel, a Portuguese who is in search of clues on the mysterious death of its father and ends up living a love forbidden with her. The terrible Osorio is also in the village, working as a factor at a nearby farm, and is not only linked to the pains of Juliana's life, although she does not know, as well as Miguel, since he was involved in the murder of the boy's father.

== Cast ==
- Gabriela Moreyra as Juliana dos Anjos
- Pedro Carvalho as Miguel Sales
- Thaís Fersoza as Maria Isabel de Avelar
- Zezé Motta as Tia Joaquina
- Fernando Pavão as Fernando Almeida 'Comendador Almeida'
- Roberta Gualda as Teresa de Avelar Almeida
- Léo Rosa as Átila Duarte
- Milena Toscano as Filipa Gomes do Amaral / Joana Gomes do Amaral (young)
- Lidi Lisboa as Esméria / Malica Darrila
- Roger Gobeth as Guilherme Gomes do Amaral
- Luiz Guilherme as Coronel Quintiliano Gomes do Amaral
- Bete Coelho as Beatrice de Avelar
- Luíza Tomé as Rosalinda Pavão
- Adriana Lessa as Condessa Catarina Gama de Luccock / Jamala Darrila
- Jussara Freire as Urraca de Góis Almeida 'Baronesa de Barangalha'
- Jayme Periard as Osório
- Robertha Portella as Petúnia
- Karen Marinho as Beleza Soares 'Belezinha'
- Raphael Montagner as Tomás Gomes do Amaral
- Saulo Meneghetti as Charles de Alencastro
- Cássio Scapin as Antonio José de Alcântara as 'Tozé'
- Débora Gomez as Violeta Pavão
- Manuela Duarte as Dália Bem-Me-Quer
- César Pezzuoli as Nestor Soares
- Adriana Londoño as Irani Goitacá Soares
- Sidney Santiago as Sapião
- Junno Andrade as Capitão Loreto Veloso
- Mariza Marchetti as Rebeca Andrade Gama 'Lady Rebeca'
- Marcelo Batista as Kamau / Viriato
- Rogério Brito as Genésio
- Marcelo Escorel as Zé Leão
- Nill Marcondes as Tito Pardo
- Henri Pagnoncelli as Dr. Augusto Pacheco
- Elina de Souza as Bá Teixeira
- Graça Andrade as Gonzalina
- Júlio Levy as Soldado Crisaldo
- Ronaldo Reis as Soldado Sereno
- Théo Salomão as Leôncio Almeida de Avelar
- Bianca Paiva as Jasmin Duarte / Dorinha
- Jean Dandrah as Frei Abilio
- Isabella Bittar as Camélia
- Priscila Vaz as Margarida
- Amanda Anequini as Tulipa
- Taisa Pelosi as Orquídea

=== Special participation ===
- Nayara Justino as Luena
- Antônio Petrin as Coronel Custódio de Avelar
- Ivan de Almeida as Velho Tião
- Neusa Borges as Mãe Quitéria
- Patrícia Mayo as Elza de Avelar
- [Victor Wagner] as Barbudo
- Luciana Vendramini as Ximena Veloso
- Moara Semeghini as Joana Gomes do Amaral
- Lara Córdula as Cigana Selma
- Kaik Pereira as Sapião (young)
- Rachel Aguiar as Maria Isabel de Avelar (young)
- Gaby Benevides as Rosalinda Pavão (young)
- Joana Rodrigues as Beatrice de Avelar (young)
- Cristhian Fernandes as Quintiliano do Amaral (young)
- Kido Mathelart as Soldado Peixoto
- Taiguara Nazareth as Líder dos quilombolas
- Evelyn Montesano as Tirinda
- Ton Crivelaro as Capitão do Mato

== Production ==
Filming began on May 21, 2015. The telenovela used 4K resolution, a format superior to the traditional HD of 1080i, having a dimension of 3840 pixels, the same used by Hollywood films for definition in cinematographic screens, leaving the images with a cinematographic dress. It was the first Brazilian production among all the stations that used this technology. The episode had a budget of R$350,000.

== Ratings ==
Timeslot (BRT/AMT)	Episodes	First aired		Last aired	
Timeslot (BRT/AMT)	Episodes	Date	Viewers (in points)	Date	Viewers (in points)
Mon–Fri 7:30pm	159	May 31, 2016	14	January 9, 2017	11
