= Good Luck, Sweetheart =

2012 film directed by Daniel Aragão

- Theatrical release poster
- Directed by: Daniel Aragão
- Written by: Daniel Aragão
- Produced by: Pedro Severien
- Starring: Maeve Jinkings; Christiana Ubach; Vinicius Zinn
- Cinematography: Pedro Sotero
- Edited by: Daniel Aragão
- Production company: Orquestra Cinema Estúdios
- Distributed by: Cicatrix Filmes
- Release dates: 9 August 2012 (Film Festival Locarno); 30 August 2013 (Brazil)
- Running time: 95 minutes
- Country: Brazil
- Language: Portuguese
- Budget: R$ 670,000

Good Luck, Sweetheart (Portuguese: Boa sorte, meu amor) is a 2012 Brazilian drama film directed by Daniel Aragão.

== Plot ==
Dirceu (Vinicius Zinn) is a 30-year-old man who comes from an aristocratic family of the sertão. He works in a demolition company, helping the various transformations that the city of Recife has passed in recent years. When he meets Maria (Christiana Ubach), a student of music with soul of an artist, he shall feel the urgency for changes in his own life.

== Cast ==
- Maeve Jinkings as Juliana
- Christiana Ubach as Maria
- Vinicius Zinn as Dirceu
