= Cyria Coentro =

Brazilian actress and presenter

- Born: Cyria Cristina Rocha Coentro; April 14, 1966 (age 60); Salvador, Brazil
- Occupations: Actress; TV Presenter
- Years active: 1988–present

Cyria Cristina Rocha Coentro (born April 14, 1966) is a Brazilian actress and presenter. She became known for her role in the telenovela Renascer (1993). She also appeared in O Rei do Gado (1997) and other television projects, gaining wider recognition for her performance in Viver a Vida (2009) and for starring in Flor do Caribe (2013) and Sete Vidas (2015).

In cinema, she appeared in the films Gonzaga – de Pai pra Filho (2012) and Time and the Wind (2013).

== Career ==
Coentro was born in Salvador, Bahia, on April 14, 1966. She started her television career at the age of 26 in the Rede Globo telenovela Renascer and has since played a number of roles on the network. Her telenovela credits include O Rei do Gado, Porto dos Milagres, Viver a Vida and others. Coentro gained further recognition for her role in the telenovela Sete Vidas, by Lícia Manzo.

After participating in episodes of Você Decide (1993 and 1994), she joined the cast of the Rede Globo telenovela O Rei do Gado (1997), where she played Maria da Luz. In 1998, she joined the cast of Dona Flor e Seus Dois Maridos as Juliana, where she was part of a homosexual couple. In 2001, she made a guest appearance in the telenovela Porto dos Milagres as Flávia. In 2003, she also participated in Mulheres Apaixonadas, by Manoel Carlos, as Roberta.

== Filmography ==
=== Television ===
| Year | Title | Role | Notes |
|---|---|---|---|
| 1993 | Renascer | Young Morena da Silva | Episode: "January 8–11" |
| 1993 | Você Decide | Dôdo | Episode: "Ídolo Perdido" |
| 1994 | Você Decide | | Episode: "Carga Pesada" |
| 1996 | O Rei do Gado | Maria da Luz | |
| 1998 | Dona Flor e Seus Dois Maridos | Juliana Rodrigues Chávez | |
| 1998 | Danada de Sabida | Edelzuita "Dezinha" Guerreiro | Television film |
| 2001 | Porto dos Milagres | Flávia | |
| 2002 | Pastores da Noite | Raimunda | |
| 2003 | Mulheres Apaixonadas | Roberta | Participation |
| 2004 | Linha Direta | Luzia Alves dos Santos | Episode: "E.Q.M." |
| 2006 | Carga Pesada | Déia | Episode: "Infância Roubada" |
| 2006 | Pé na Jaca | Attendant | Participation |
| 2007 | Amazônia, de Galvez a Chico Mendes | Socorro | Participation |
| 2008 | A Favorita | Bianca Chagas | Participation |
| 2009 | Caminho das Índias | Bahuan's mother | Episode: "January 20th" |
| 2009 | Viver a Vida | Matilde Vilela | |
| 2011 | Força-Tarefa | Presenter | |
| 2012 | As Brasileiras | Neighbor | Episode: "A Justiceira de Olinda" |
| 2013 | Flor do Caribe | Beatriz "Bibiana" da Silva | |
| 2013 | Gonzaga - de Pai pra Filho | Santana Gonzaga | |
| 2014 | O Tempo e o Vento | Henriqueta Terra | |
| 2014 | Em Família | Young Maria Luz Machado | Episode: "February 3–10" |
| 2014 | O Rebu | Marineide | |
| 2015 | Sete Vidas | Marlene Figueira e Meira | |
| 2016 | Velho Chico | Young Piedade Maria dos Anjos | |
| 2017 | Os Dias Eram Assim | Laura Garcia | |
| 2018 | Entre Irmãs | Sofia | |
| 2018 | O Tempo Não Para | Marciana Ribeiro | |
| 2018–present | Impuros | Arlete | |
| 2021 | Sob Pressão | Nilce | Episode: "Episode 3" Episode: "Episode 9" |
| 2022 | Nos Tempos do Imperador | Ana Néri | Episode: "January 11th" |
| 2022 | Não Foi Minha Culpa | Jane | Episode: "Maria do Carmo" |
| 2022 | Mar do Sertão | Maria Domitila "Dodôca" Madeira | |
| 2023 | Fuzuê | Emília | |

=== Film ===
| Year | Title | Role |
|---|---|---|
| 2001 | 3 Histórias da Bahia | Maria Luiza |
| | Estranhos | Amparo |
| 2004 | Irmãos de Fé | Prayer woman |
| 2008 | Once Upon a Time in Rio | Bernadete |
| 2012 | Gonzaga - de Pai pra Filho | Santana |
| 2013 | Time and the Wind | Henriqueta Terra |
| 2015 | Travessia | Leila |
| 2017 | Entre Irmãs | Sofia |
| 2017 | Redemoinho | Helia |
| 2019 | O Avental Rosa | Alice |
| 2019 | Impuros - O Filme | Arlete |
| 2022 | Meteoros | Isadora |

== Stage ==
Stage
| Year | Title |
|---|---|
| 1988 | Anestesia |
| 1989 | Recital da Novíssima Poesia Baiana |
| 1992 | Bróder: Uma Odisseia Fantástica |
| 1994 | Dizem de Mim o Diabo |
| 1995 | Mistérios Gozosos |
| 1997 | Suburra |
| 2001 | O Diário do Convento |
| 2012 | Los Catedrásticos - Nova Mente |
| 2014 | Love |
| 2019 | Love |
