= Max Fercondini =

Brazilian actor, television producer and presenter

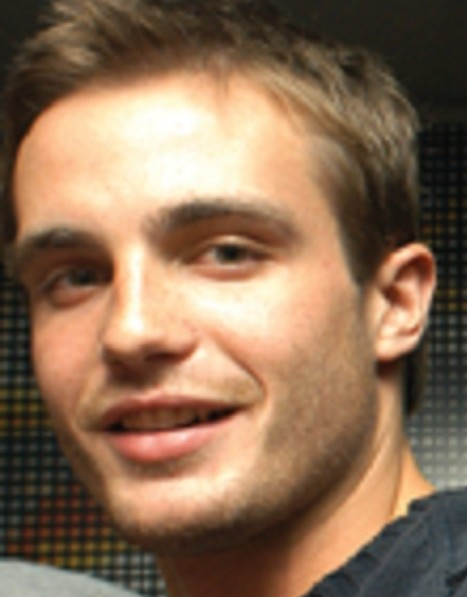
- Born: Max Kablukow Fercondini; 1 September 1985 (age 40); São Paulo, Brazil, São Paulo, Brazil
- Occupations: Actor; producer; reporter
- Years active: 2000–present
- Family: Jadir Fercondini (father); Márcia Kabuklow (mother); Jean Fercondini (younger brother)

Max Kablukow Fercondini (born September 1, 1985) is a Brazilian actor, television producer and presenter.

== Filmography ==
=== Film ===
Year	Title	Role	Notes
2006	Anfitriões	Pedro	Short film
2006	O Maior Amor do Mundo	Young Antônio	
2007	CD-Player	Lover	Short film
2011	Uma Professora muito Maluquinha	Mário	

=== Television ===
Year	Title	Role	Notes
2000	Esplendor	Frederico Berger Junior (Freddy)	
2000	Laços de Família	Fábio	
2001–02	Malhação	Leonardo Ferreira (Léo)	Season 8
2003	Agora É que São Elas	Hugo	
2004	Um Só Coração	João Cândido de Sousa Borba (Candinho)	
2004	Começar de Novo	Murilo	
2005	Linha Direta	Alexandre Laks	Episode: "Caso Mengele"
2006	Tecendo o Saber	Ovídio	Episode: "A Floresta Que Pede Socorro"
2006	Páginas da Vida	Sérgio Toledo Flores	
2007	Sete Pecados	Aquiles de Sousa	
2008	Ciranda de Pedra	Conrado Cassini	
2009–14	Globo Ecologia	Presenter	
2009	Viver a Vida	Doctor Ricardo Moreira	
2010	Laços de Sangue	Ricardo	Episode: "20 de setembro de 2010"
2010	A Princesa e o Vagabundo	Michel Landino	Year end special
2011	Morde & Assopra	Delegate Wilson Villanova	
2012	Super Chef Celebridades	Participant	Season 1
2013	Flor do Caribe	Tenent Ciro Albuquerque	
2014–present	Como Será?	Reporter	
