= Mariza Marchetti =

Brazilian actor

- Born: 25 November 1982 (age 43); São Paulo, State of São Paulo, Brazil
- Occupation: Actor
- Years active: 1998-present
- Spouse: Charles Salvi
- Children: 2
- Website: http://www.marizamarchetti.com.br/

Mariza Marchetti Salvi (born 25 November 1982) is a Brazilian actress.

== Early life and education ==
Mariza Marchetti was born on 25 November 1982 in São Paulo.

Mariza studied at Colégio Rio Branco in Higienópolis. In 1998, she entered law school at Universidade Paulista (UNIP), graduating in 2002. In the same year she graduated, she took a scenic arts course at Incenna Escola de Teatro e Televisão.

== Career ==
In 1998 Mariza had her first TV experience narrating the pilot episode of the series Mulher. In 2000, she debuted as an actress in the miniseries Tele-tema, from the assigned channel TVC Rio, playing as the student Carla. In 2002, she was in the soap opera Marisol as Raquel, secretary of the main character, in addition to participating in the documentary Raul Roulien, um Brasileiro em Hollywood. In the following years, she made special appearances in the soap operas Seus Olhos and Revelação, in addition to being in the short films Nostra Bella Época, Além de Dois, Vida a Três and Noturno. In 2009, she signed with the portal Spetáculos and had her first experience with the internet starring in the web-novel Vento Norte as the suffering Raíssa, moving in the same year to the position of antagonist in Black Tie, as the ambitious Micaella L'faire. In 2012 she was in the cast of Máscaras, from Rede Record, playing as the gynecologist Paula Aguillar.

In 2013, she joined the cast of Flor do Caribe, from Rede Globo, as the doctor Márcia, who maintained an NGO to treat children and adolescents who suffered sexual exploitation. In 2016 she got the opportunity to play her first prominent role, Lady Rebeca in Escrava Mãe, an abolitionist who fought for the emancipation of women. In 2017 she played Malca in O Rico e Lázaro.

== Filmography ==
NOTE: The names of the films and the roles played are in Portuguese. See the original Wikipedia page here.

=== Television ===
Year	Títle	Role	Notes
1998	Mulher	Natália	Episode: "O Princípio de Tudo"
2000	Tele-Tema	Carla	
2002	Marisol	Raquel	
2004	Seus Olhos	Enfermeira	Episode: "May 22, 2004"
2008	Revelação	Bargirl	Episode: "December 26, 2008"
2012	Máscaras	Dra. Paula Aguillar	
2013	Flor do Caribe	Dra. Márcia	
2016	Escrava Mãe	Rebeca Andrade Gama (Lady Rebeca)	
2017	O Rico e Lázaro	Malca	

=== Web ===
Year	Title	Role	
2009	Vento Norte	Raíssa Medeiros	Web-soap on the Spetáculos portal
2009	Black Tie	Micaella L'faire	Web-soap on the Spetáculos portal

=== Film ===
Year	Title	Role	
2002	Raul Roulien, um Brasileiro em Hollywood	Ginger Rogers	Documentary
2009	Nostra Bella Época	Minie Jeans	
2009	Além de Dois	Eva	Short Film
2010	Vida a Três	Sheilóca	Short Film
2011	Noturno	Marcela	Short Film

== Theater ==
NOTE: The names of the films and the roles played are in Portuguese.

Year	Title	Role
2001	Boca de Ouro	Celeste
2001	A Moratória	Lucília
2001	Lisístrata	Lisístrata
2001	Hamlet	Ofélia
2002	Sonho de Uma Noite de Verão	Hérmia
2002	Vestido de Noiva	Mulher de Véu
2002	A Bela Adormecida	Rainha
2002	O Inferno São Os Outros	Lucília
2003	O Guarani	Cecília
2003	A Pele da Alma	Sra. Claudel
2003–05	Memórias Póstumas de Brás Cubas	Marcela
2004	O Cortiço	Leocádia
2004–05	Memórias de um Sargento de Milícias	Maria Hortaliça
2005	A Hora da Estrela	Da Glória
2006	Leques e Babados	Janete
2006–07	Chapeuzinho Vermelho	Chapeuzinho Vermelho
2008	Vida Dura Não é Mole	Lili
2008–09	A Vida Secreta de Batman e Robin	Mulher Maravilha / Mulher Gato
2008–09	Branca de Neve Não Mora Mais Aqui	Branca de Neve / Rainha Má
2010–11	As Mona Lisas	Luiza
