= Daniela Escobar =

Brazilian actress (born 1969)

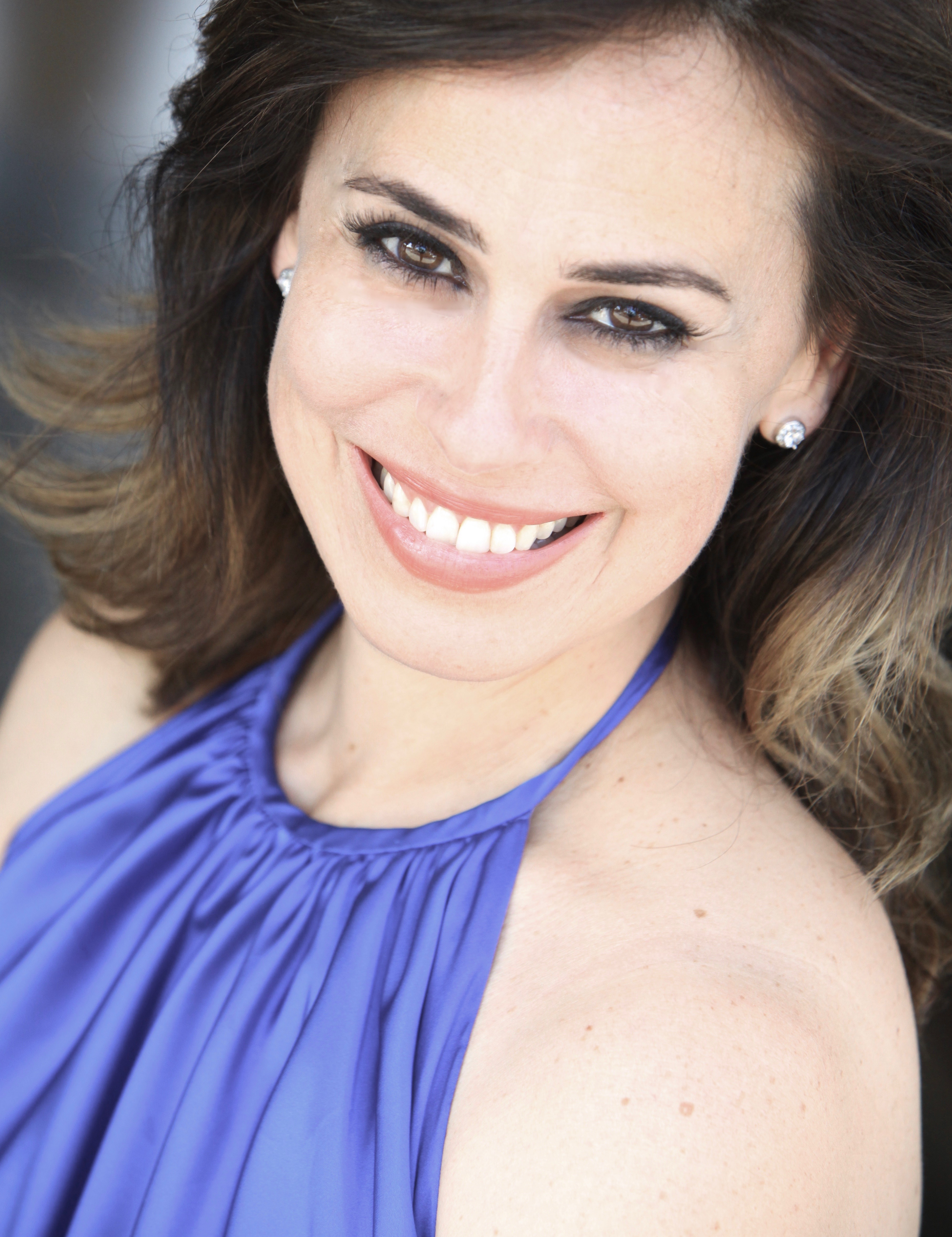
- Escobar in 2016
- Born: Daniela Escobar Duncan; 16 January 1969 (age 57); São Borja, Rio Grande do Sul, Brazil
- Education: Pontifical Catholic University of Rio Grande do Sul; University of California, Los Angeles
- Occupations: Actress; television presenter; voice actress
- Years active: 1989–present
- Spouses: Jayme Monjardim (m. 1997; div. 2003); Marcelo Woellner (m. 2009; div. 2010)
- Children: 1

Daniela Escobar Duncan (born 16 January 1969) is a Brazilian actress, television presenter and voice actress.

== Biography ==
Escobar was born in São Borja, in the state of Rio Grande do Sul, Brazil At the age of ten, she moved with her family to Porto Alegre, Brazil. Her father Joao Carlos Escobar is a corporate lawyer and author, and her mother Lucia Iara Tatsch, an English teacher. Escobar's ancestry includes German, Austrian, and Portuguese.

== Career ==
Escobar began her acting career in Rio de Janeiro at the age of 19 years old. In 1990 she made the transition from stage to television.

From 1994 to 2015 she was contracted to star in a myriad of prime time popular television shows for TV Globo Brasil appearing in more than 25 TV Series as well as a series of independent movies. She starred in the film Diário de um Novo Mundo. Her most memorable performance was in O Clone novel 2001, where she played a mother who suffers and struggles to regain the trust of her daughter, a drug addict. In 2005 she participated in the América soap opera.

In 2010, Escobar went back to theater, along with actor Daniel de Oliveira in the controversial drama 400 Contra 1 - Uma História do Crime Organizado, a story about the rise of criminal organization Commando Vermelho. The film is directed by Caco Souza.

In 2011, Escobar made a cameo in the final chapters of the novel Ti Ti Ti Daguilene as the mother of Stefany's character, Sophie Charlotte.

She can currently be seen on TV in the novel 18h, A Vida da Gente, where she plays Suzana, foster mother of the character Alice, played by actress Sthefany Brito.

In 2013, will novel Flor do Caribe, playing the biologist Natália. In 2017, Escobar signed with RecordTV to play Ângela in the Apocalipse.

Since 2014 Escobar serves as a juror on the International Emmy Awards committee.

== Personal life ==
Escobar married Brazilian Film and Television director Jayme Monjardim. They have a son, André Matarazzo, who is an actor. Monjardim and Escobar divorced in 2003. Escobar subsequently married businessman Marcelo Woellner in 2009, but divorced later in 2010. In 2017 Escobar became a vegetarian and has since become a health coach, graduating from the "Health Coach Institute of Chicago".

Currently, Escobar lives in Los Angeles, California.

== Filmography ==
=== Television ===
Year	Film	Credit	Notes
1992	Você Decide	Patrícia	Episode: "Tabu"
1994	A Madona de Cedro	Laura	
1994	Tropicaliente	Berenice	
1995	A Idade da Loba	Gaby	
1996	Anjo de Mim	Teresa	
1997	Você Decide		Episode: "O Sósia"
1998	Você Decide	Laura	Episode: "Laura"
1999	Chiquinha Gonzaga	Amália	
2000	Você Decide	Marlene	Episode: "Mania de Casar"
2000	Aquarela do Brasil	Bella Landau	
2000	Superbonita	Presenter	2000–2005
2001	Brava Gente	Lucila	Episode: "A Sonata"
2001	O Clone	Maysa Ferraz	
2003	A Casa das Sete Mulheres	Perpétua	
2003	Kubanacan	Vanda	Episodes: "May 27–29, 2003"
2004	Um Só Coração	Soledad	
2004	A Diarista	Sofia	Episode: "Aquele com a Volta da Sósia"
2005	América	Irene Villa Nova	
2005	Dança dos Famosos 1	Participant	Domingão do Faustão's reality show
2006	A Diarista	Sônia	Episode: "Aquele do Papagaio"
2007	O Segredo da Princesa Lili	Yrvana	Special year-end
2008	Dicas de um Sedutor	Olívia	Episode: "Amor Não Tem Idade"
2011	Ti Ti Ti	Daguilene Oliveira / Pâmela	Special participation
2011	A Vida da Gente	Suzana Ybarra Moraes	
2013	Flor do Caribe	Natália Fonseca	
2015	Amor secreto	Irene Gutiérrez Vielma	Brazilian voice dubbing
2016	A Garota da Moto	Bernarda Sales de Albuquerque	Season 1
2017	Apocalipse	Ângela Menezes	

=== Films ===
Year	Film	Credit	Notes
1996	Ritinha	Ritinha	Short film
2004	Vida de Menina	Carolina	
2005	Jogo Subterrâneo	Tânia	
2005	Diário de um Novo Mundo	Dona Maria	
2006	O Dono do Mar	Camborina	
2010	400 Contra 1 - Uma História do Crime Organizado	Teresa	
2016	Cold	Britney	
2016	Another Forever	Alice	
2017	Erase Me	Helena (voice)	Short film
2017	Finding Josef		
2017	Diminuta	Dra. Anne	
