= Simone Soares =

Brazilian actress (born 1977)

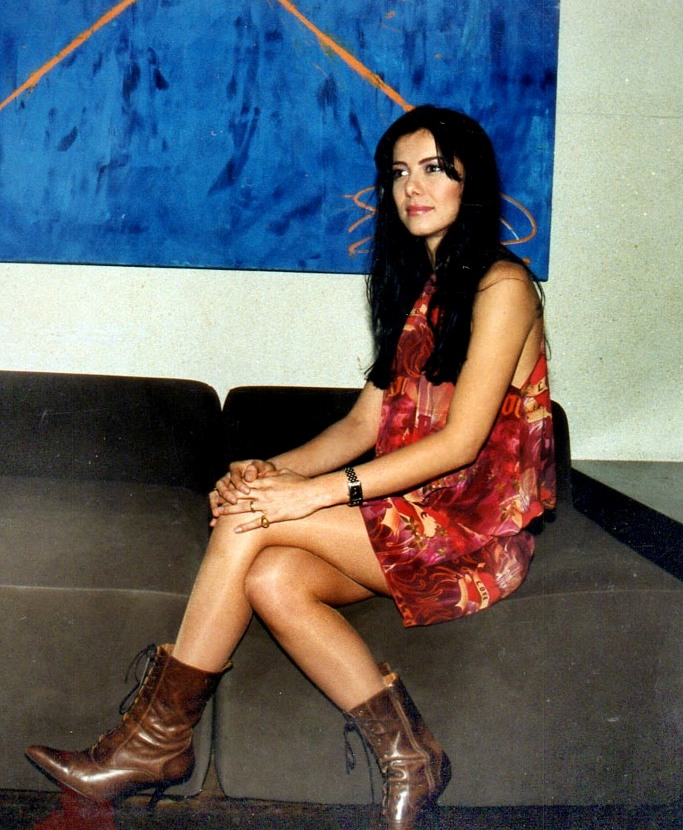
- Born: 26 March 1977 (age 48); Taubaté, São Paulo, Brazil
- Occupation: Actress
- Children: 1

Simone Soares (born 26 March 1977) is a Brazilian actress.

== Career ==
In television, started in 1998, Rede Record, when she acted in A História de Ester. Still made in the same station, in 1999 Tiro e Queda and Louca Paixão. After the actress went to SBT and participated alumnus Ô... Coitado. In 2002, she served in the novel Marisol.

In 2005, she moved to Rede Globo and entered into A Lua Me Disse. In 2006, she made Os Amadores. Then the novel O Profeta. In 2007, she participated in the series Sob Nova Direção. Then came the novel Sete Pecados. In 2008, another series Casos e Acasos, Dicas de Um Sedutor and Guerra e Paz.

In 2009, she participated in the miniseries Maysa - Quando Fala o Coração. Came later in the novel Malhação. Made after Aline. Then the novel Caras & Bocas. Written in 2010 Escrito nas Estrelas and in 2011 O Astro.

== Personal life ==
Soares was married to director Mário Meirelles and had a daughter, Luana.

== Filmography ==
=== Television ===
Year	Title	Role	Note
1998	A História de Ester	Daniele Monastero	Cameo
1999	Tiro e Queda	Gisele	Cameo
1999	Louca Paixão	Dulce	Cameo
1999	Ô... Coitado	candidate to work for Stevie	Cameo
2002	Marisol	Sheila	Cameo
2005	A Lua Me Disse	Marta Oliveira	
2006	Os Amadores	Nívea	Cameo
2006	O Profeta	Zélia de Castro Andrade	
2007	Sob Nova Direção	Mira	Cameo
2007	Sete Pecados	Núbia	Cameo
2008	Dicas de Um Sedutor		Episode: "Filho Atrapalha?"
2008	Casos e Acasos		Episode: "O Colchão, a Mala e a Balada"
2008	Guerra e Paz	Vivi	Episode: "Culpados & Inocentes"
2009	Maysa - Quando Fala o Coração	Nina	
2009	Malhação	Vicky Veronese	Cameo
2009	Aline		Episode: "Aniversário de Aline"
2009	Caras & Bocas	Paloma	Cameo
2010	Escrito nas Estrelas	Fernanda	
2011	O Astro	Laura Paranhos	
2013	Flor do Caribe	Regina	Cameo
2014	Em Família	Mafalda Soares	1st phase and 2nd
2018	Apocalipse	Joice	Participation

=== Film ===
- 2005 - Tempo Real (short film)
- 2005 - Silêncio e Pecado (short film)
- 2005 - Over the Hedge - Brazilian voice dubbing
- 2009 - Xuxa em O Mistério de Feiurinha .... Sleeping Beauty
- 2010 - Incômodo (short film)
- 2011 - Assalto ao Banco Central ... Reporter
