= A Garota da Moto =

Brazilian drama television series

- Genre: Drama; Adventure; Comedy
- Created by: David França Mendes; João Daniel Tikhomiroff
- Written by: David França Mendes; Cláudio Felicio; Patrícia Lopes; Rodrigo Ferrari; Isabela Poppe
- Directed by: Marcelo Cordeiro de Souza; Julia Jordão; João Daniel Tikhomiroff
- Starring: Christiana Ubach; Daniela Escobar; Murilo Grossi; Tatsu Carvalho; Enzo Barone; Marta Nowill; Sacha Bali
- Opening theme: "O Coração e o Vento" by Marina Decourt
- Country of origin: Brazil
- Original language: Portuguese
- No. of seasons: 2 (season two in 2019)
- No. of episodes: 52

Production
- Editor: Tony Tiger
- Running time: 45 minutes
- Production companies: Mixer; Fox Networks Group Brasil; SBT

Original release
- Network: SBT
- Release: July 13, 2016 – present

A Garota da Moto is a Brazilian drama television series that premiered on July 13, 2016, on SBT. The series is produced by Mixer and co-produced with Fox Networks Group Brasil and SBT.

== Synopsis ==
Joana is a woman who has a dark past. She has been in extramarital relationship with a millionaire man, as a result of the relationship, the two had a son, Nico. The now millionaire widow, Bernarda, starts chasing Joana not to lose the inheritance. Joana then escapes from Rio de Janeiro to São Paulo and starts working as a motorcycle courier in the company "Motópolis". In company she lives with a humorous staff and has a more exultant life. Later, Bernarda and his cronies discover where Joan is and continues to pursue her, leaving her terrified.

== Cast ==
Actor	Character
Christiana Ubach	Joana
Daniela Escobar	Bernarda Sales de Albuquerque
Tatsu Carvalho	Duda Sales de Albuquerque
Murilo Grossi	Reinaldo
Sacha Bali	Dinho
Martha Nowill	Pam
Thiago Amaral	Bactéria
Fernanda Viacava	Val
Ricardo Monastero	Pablo
Felipe Montanari	Marley
Thiago Freitas	Túlio
Dudu Sá	Juliano
Fábio Nassar	Mickey
Agnes Zuliani	Dona Laura
Gilda Nomacce	Liége
Claudionor Cruz	Nô
Enzo Barone	Nico

== Production ==
=== Pre ===
The first mention of the project was made by Ancine in 2013. The SBT began production with the choice of protagonist. in August 2014 by going to A Garota da Moto was scheduled to debut in 2015, but due to the delay in the release of the budget, which occurred in January 2015, was postponed to 2016. The cost of production was 2.5 million reais paid with public and private investments – by Ancine and Sector Fund audiovisual.

=== Recordings ===
The recordings began in August 2015 with Christiana Ubach, Daniela Escobar and Sacha Bali confirmeds in the cast. The recordings was completed in February 2016. To record some scenes, the cast had classes Kung fu. Christiana Ubach had to learn to ride bike to the recordings of his character. Due to lack of time, Ubach had to use body double in most scenes.

=== Marketing ===
In March 2016 the newspaper Estadão reported that the premiere take place between April and June. The first teaser took place on April 7, 2016, announcing that the premiere would take place later in June. Later became informed including SBT commercials, the debut only occur in early July.

In may, Andreh Gomez's of site Observatório da Televisão criticized the way the SBT announces commercial the show excess and using "complete calls" missing two months to debut. Daniela Escobar had to go of Los Angeles to the auditorium of the SBT in Osasco, just to make the press conference on 28 June 2016.

=== Public ===
"Our theme is always the entertainment and get more real life. The program had change, but the target audience is the same (...) We had very important new [TV] series and we realize that these programs could leverage the audience. It's a programming with action and adventure." - Gustavo Leme, FOX Networks Group Brazil explaining the reason to put the program on a channel for women over 25 years. Producers of series revealed that the initial idea is to convey A Garota da Moto to the public from 18 to 35 years.

== Release ==
The series premiered on SBT on July 13, 2016. The streaming service Amazon Prime Video purchased rights to broadcast the series in Latin America.
