= Rita Buzzar =

Brazilian screenwriter and film producer

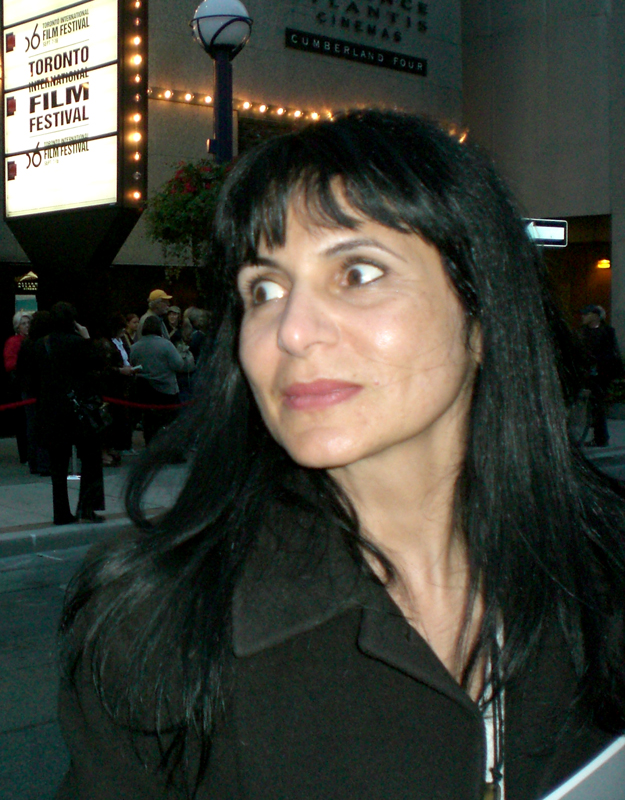
Roteirista e produtora Rita Buzzar

Rita Buzzar is a Brazilian screenwriter and film producer founder of Nexus Cinema e video.

== Biography ==
Rita Buzzar is a screenwriter, film producer, and movie director from "Nexus Cinema e Video", a film company from Brazil. She is graduated in Cinema at the University of São Paulo.

She wrote television hits such as the mini-series "Rosa dos Rumos" (1990–91), the soap opera "A Historia de Ana Raio e Ze Trovao" (1990–91) and "A Queridinha", directed by Walter Avancini. All of them for "Rede Manchete network".

She also wrote "Lara" and "Maria dos Prazeres", both screenplays. The last one is an international production by Carlo Ponti.

She worked with Gabriel Garcia Marquez in "Amores Posibles", a TV Series, for Spanish Television.

Her project "Luz no Céu" was selected for a screen-writing workshop at Sundance Institute, in the USA.

She directed many TV Documentaries, including "Carandiru.doc" about Carandiru Detention Center and the filming process of Hector Babenco's movie inside the prison.

She wrote Olga, a movie she produced in association with "Globo Filmes" and "Lumiere". "Olga" has been watched by more than three million viewers and has won more than 20 awards in and out of Brazil.

She wrote and produced "Budapest", a movie inspired on Chico Buarque's homonymous novel. It was a co-production among Brazil, Portugal and Hungary, directed by Walter Carvalho and released in May 2009.

Rita produced "O Tempo e o Vento", another movie with the director Jayme Monjardim, inspired on the epic novel from the celebrated Brazilian writer Erico Verissimo.

She wrote and is producing "Forgetiminoti", which is going to be directed by Roberto Moreira; and "Duetto", a Brazil-Italy co-production. The director is Marcos Jorge, who also directed "Estômago". She is also producing "Madame Durocher", a France-Brazil co-production movie. Both movies are on pre-production stage.
