= Gracindo Júnior =

Brazilian actor and film director (1943–2026)

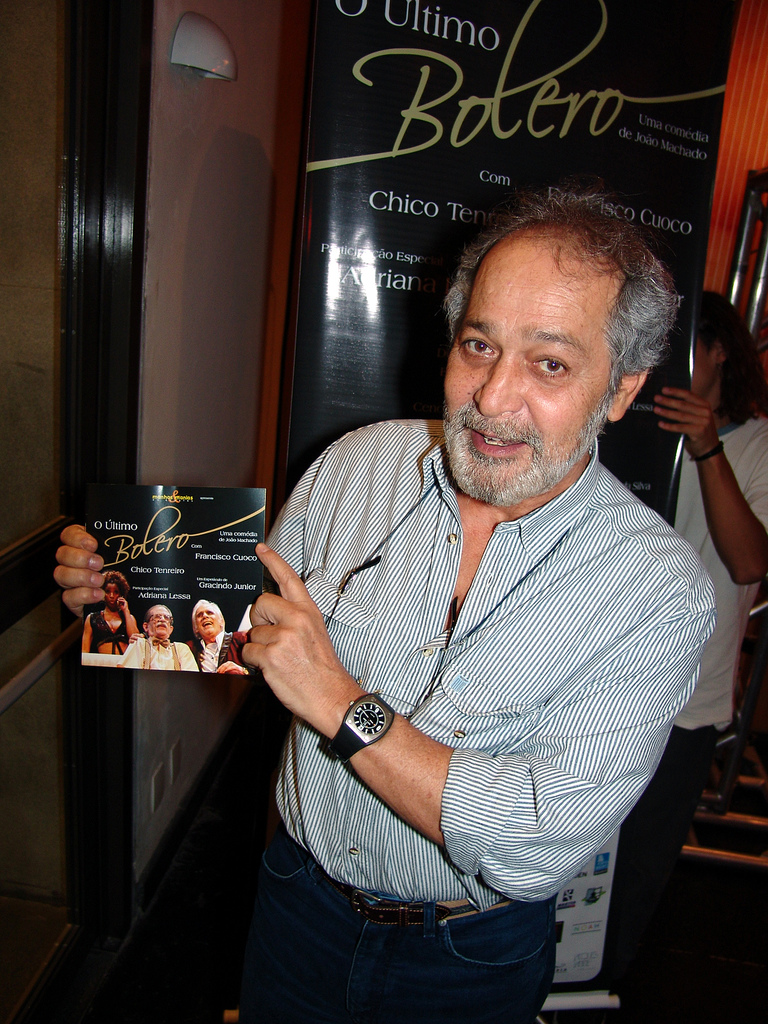
- Gracindo in 2007
- Born: Epaminondas Xavier Gracindo; 21 May 1943; Rio de Janeiro, Brazil
- Died: 1 September 2026 (aged 83); Rio de Janeiro, Brazil
- Occupations: Actor; director
- Years active: 1965–2020

Epaminondas Xavier Gracindo (21 May 1943 – 1 September 2026), better known as Gracindo Júnior, was a Brazilian actor and film director. He was son of the also actor Paulo Gracindo.

Gracindo started his career on the stage before moving to film, notably playing Saul in the miniseries Rei Davi. He also appeared in the telenovela Ouro Verde.

Gracindo died in Rio de Janeiro on 1 September 2026, at the age of 83.

== Filmography ==
=== As actor ===
- O Trapalhão na Arca de Noé (1983)
- The Emerald Forest (1985)
- Kickboxer 3 (1992)
- The Forest (2002)
- Tainá 3: The Origin (2011)

=== As director ===
- A Sucessora (1978–1979)
- Marron Glacê (1979–1980)
- Os Trapalhões (1983–1984)
- Sítio do Picapau Amarelo (1985)
- Você Decide (1992)
- Explode Coração (1996)
