= Maysa Matarazzo =

Brazilian singer (1936–1977)

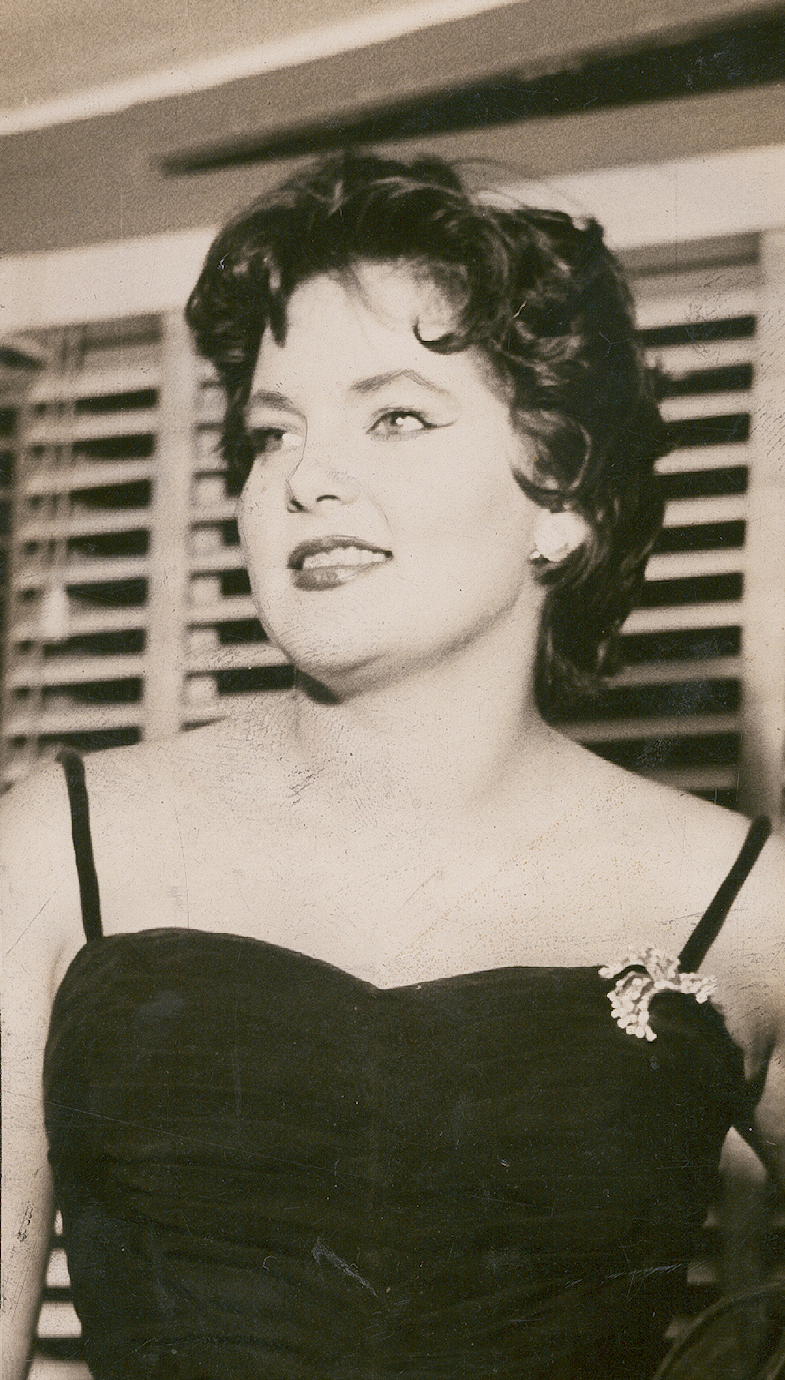
- Matarazzo in 1958
- Born: Maysa Figueira Monjardim; June 6, 1936; Rio de Janeiro, Brazil
- Died: January 22, 1977 (aged 40); Rio–Niterói Bridge, Rio de Janeiro, Brazil
- Occupation: Singer
- Years active: 1956–1977
- Spouse: André Matarazzo (m. 1954; sep. 1957)
- Children: Jayme Monjardim

Maysa Figueira Monjardim (June 6, 1936 – January 22, 1977), better known as Maysa Matarazzo, was a Brazilian singer-songwriter, performer and actress. She is also associated with Bossa nova music but is widely known as a torch song (fossa) interpreter.

== Biography ==
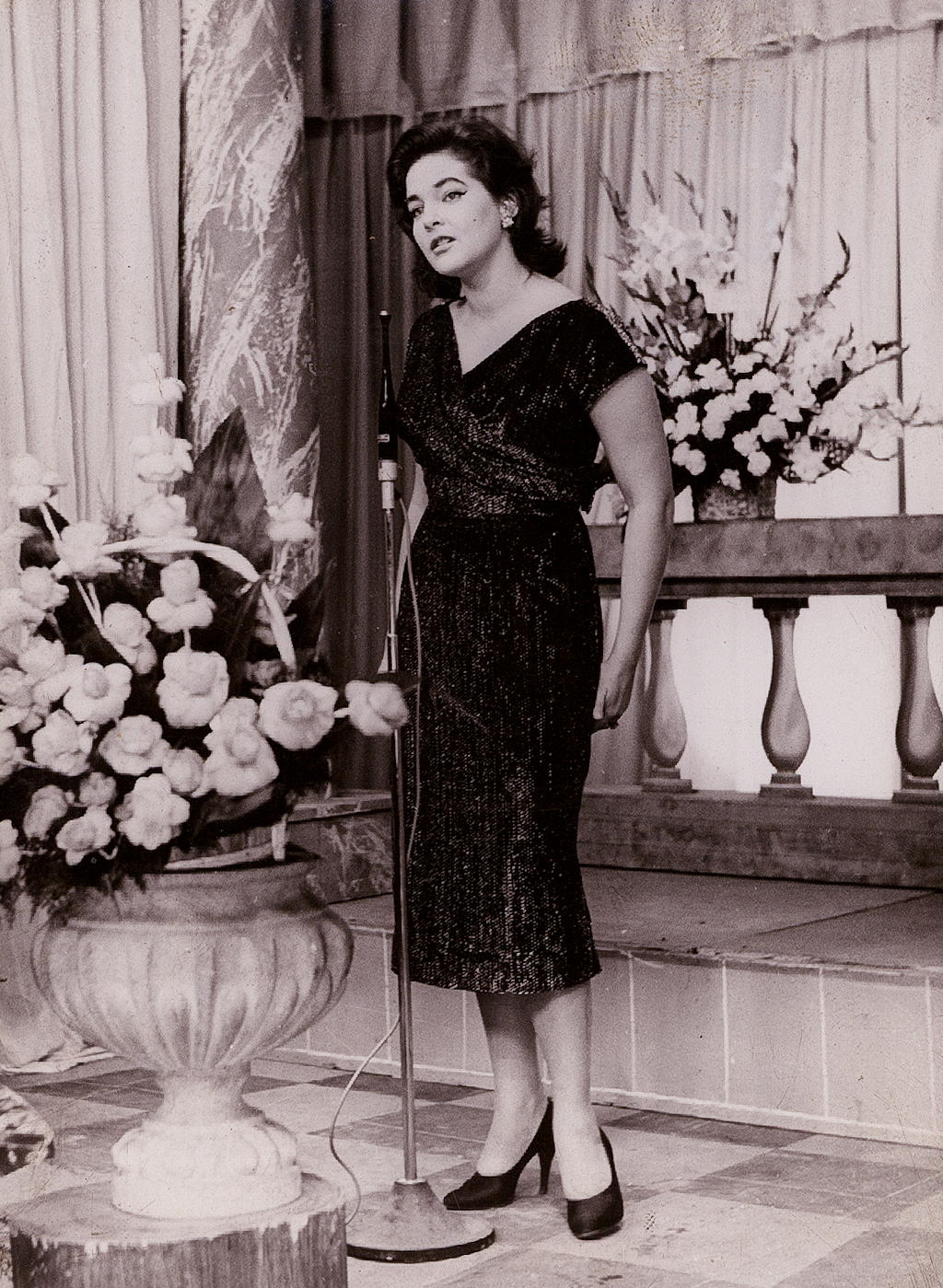
Maysa, 1956.

The daughter of Alcibíades Guaraná Monjardim and Inah Borges Figueira, Matarazzo showed talent at a young age and by twelve had written a samba song, which later became a hit from her first album. She married André Matarazzo Filho, a member of a wealthy and traditional São Paulo family, and descendant of Count Francesco Matarazzo in 1954 at the age of 18 and two years later had a son, Jayme, who later would become a television director. In the late 1950s she formed a successful bossa nova group.

Her tour to Buenos Aires was a great success, and extended to Chile and Uruguay, but Matarazzo had an affair with the show's producer, Ronaldo Bôscoli, a journalist and composer linked romantically to bossa nova's muse Nara Leão. This led to a break between Nara and Ronaldo, as well as a fracture in the bossa nova movement. Matarazzo became "persona non grata" both to the bossa-novistas and the protest singers and her career faltered. She reacted by marrying Spaniard music producer Miguel Anzana, with whom she moved to Spain and began a series of presentations not only in Spain, but also Portugal, Italy and France.

Her personal life, already tumultuous, became even more chaotic, leading to her being called "the Janis Joplin of Bossa Nova". But she later made a comeback with one of the first notable shows in Rio's "Canecão" venue, the equivalent of Carnegie Hall in NYC. Matarazzo also played the Olympia in Paris to a full house twice and enjoyed considerable success in Europe. Upon her return to Brazil, Matarazzo continued to blend her "broken love affair" trademarks with the more current festival style and occasional bossa nova hits. In the 1970s Matarazzo acted in a few telenovelas in Brazil. She also composed the soundtrack for a Rede Globo telenova just as the TV network became the powerhouse of Brazilian soap operas. She died in a car crash in 1977, on the Rio-Niterói bridge, which connects the cities of Rio de Janeiro and Niterói over the Guanabara Bay.

Matarazzo's style influenced the following generations of Brazilian singers and composers, with great ascendancy in the works of Simone, Cazuza, Leila Pinheiro, Fafá de Belém and Angela Ro Ro.

In January 2009, 32 years after her death, a miniseries about her life was broadcast on Brazilian television and spanned two new books about one of Brazil's most charismatic divas. Maysa Matarazzo was portrayed by Larissa Maciel in the 2009 miniseries Maysa: Quando Fala o Coração.

== Discography ==
=== Studio albums ===
- Convite para ouvir Maysa (1956)
- Maysa (1957)
- Convite para ouvir Maysa n. 2 (1958)
- Convite para ouvir Maysa n. 3 (1958)
- Convite para ouvir Maysa n. 4 (1959)
- Maysa É Maysa... É Maysa... É Maysa (1959)
- Voltei (1960)
- Maysa Canta Sucessos (1960)
- Maysa, Amor... E Maysa (1961)
- Barquinho (1961)
- Maysa Sings Songs Before Dawn (1961)
- Canção do Amor Mais Triste (1962)
- Maysa (1964)
- Maysa (1966)
- Maysa (1969)
- Ando Só Numa Multidão de Amores (1970)
- Maysa (1974)

=== Compilation albums ===
- Os Grandes Sucessos de Maysa (1959)
- A Música de Maysa (1960)
- Ternura… é Maysa (1965)
- Dois na Fossa- Maysa & Tito Madi (1975)
- Para sempre Maysa (1977)
- Bom é Querer Bem (1978)
- Serie Retrospecto vol. 3 (1979)
- Convite para ouvir Maysa (1988)
- Maysa por ela mesma (1991)
- Canecão apresenta Maysa (1992)
- Tom Jobim por Maysa – Viva Maysa (1993)
- Maysa (1996)
- Tom Jobim por Maysa (1997)
- Bossa Nova por Maysa (1997)
- Barquinho (2000)
- Simplesmente Maysa (2000)
- Quatro em Um – Volume 13 (2001)
- Retratos – Maysa (2004)
- Novo Millennium (2005)

== See also ==
- Bossa Nova
- Samba-canção
