= Raposo =

Raposo is a surname in the Galician and Portuguese languages, namely in Portugal and Brazil, meaning “fox”. Notable people with the surname include:

- André Raposo (born 1978), Brazilian water polo player
- Celso Raposo (born 1996), Portuguese footballer
- Fernando Raposo (born 1989), French basketball player
- Gregory Raposo (born 1985), American singer and actor
- Joe Raposo (1937–1989), American composer, songwriter, and pianist
- José Raposo (born 1963), Portuguese actor
- Ryan Raposo (born 1999), Canadian soccer player
- Valentina Raposo (born 2003), Argentine field hockey player

== See also ==
- Raposa
