= Apocalipse =

- Genre: Telenovela; Drama; Supernatural
- Created by: Vívian de Oliveira
- Written by: Vívian de Oliveira, Alexandre Teixeira, Maria Claudia Oliveira
- Directed by: Edson Spinello
- Starring: Juliana Knust; Sérgio Marone; Igor Rickli; Fernando Pavão; Flávio Galvão; Bia Seidl
- Narrated by: Sérgio Marone
- Opening theme: "Adágio em G Menor"
- Country of origin: Brazil
- Original language: Portuguese
- No. of episodes: 155

Production
- Production locations: Jerusalem; New York City; Rio de Janeiro; Rome
- Camera setup: Multi-camera
- Production company: Casablanca

Original release
- Network: RecordTV
- Release: November 21, 2017 – June 25, 2018

Apocalipse is a Brazilian telenovela produced by Casablanca for RecordTV. Created by Vivian de Oliveira. Written with Alexandre Teixeira, Maria Claudia Oliveira. It premiered on November 21, 2017 and ended on June 25, 2018. It stars Igor Rickli, Sérgio Marone, Juliana Knust, Fernando Pavão, and Flávio Galvão. It is based on the Book of Revelation. It is the fourth biblical telenovela by Record TV.

== Plot ==
The story begins in the late 1980s. The first phase of the novel focuses on the relationship between four young people who, for one reason or another, chose New York as a university destination. Alan Gudman (American), Susana Aisen (Brazilian), Adriano Montana (Italian) and Débora Koheg (Israeli) become inseparable, exploring fascinating Manhattan together. Alan and Susana develop a delicate relationship that becomes a beautiful love story; Adriano and Debora are more intense and passionate and, surrounded by a mysterious and somber force, marry in a troubled way and live in an unhappy relationship. Other everyday and parallel characters appear in this first phase and will be introduced during the course of the novel.

The second phase begins in 2001, with the return of the failing couple, Adriano and Débora, and their son Ricardo to New York, where they resume contact with their old friends Alan and Susana, as well as and their children, Benjamin and Isabella. Débora, however, is envious of Susana, since her relationship with Adriano is at this point merely a facade, while Susana and Alana have a happy marriage. Several apocalyptic prophecies promise to take place in various cities around the world: in Rio de Janeiro, Rome, Jerusalem, and New York, where the fateful September 11 is part of the narrative.

The third phase brings the story to the present day and shows how the characters bacema impacted by the biblical prophecies. There will be moments of faith, hope, pain, sadness and anguish, where the audience will see the best and the worst of the human beings. Ricardo becomes the antagonist of the story, the Antichrist who will fight to dominate the world; he will empower himself with scientific discoveries of his childhood friend Benjamin, who has become a brilliant scientist and has married a successful television reporter Zoe Santero, his childhood love, and will use it to commit atrocities against people who oppose his tyrannical rule. People of the past who have committed terrible acts may surprise the public by repenting and accepting Christ before it becomes too late, while "lukewarm" Christians may not resist Ricardo's rule and begin to worship the devil in mistaken belief that doing so will spare them from death, exchanging their souls for temporary comfort.

== Cast ==
- Juliana Knust as Zoe Santero
- Igor Rickli as Benjamin Gudman
- Sérgio Marone as Ricardo Montana 'The Antichrist'
- Paloma Bernardi as Isabela Gudman
- Fernando Pavão as César Sardes
- Juliana Silveira as Raquel Santero Sardes
- Bia Seidl as Débora Koheg
- Selma Egrei as Verônica Montana
- Eduardo Lago as Adriano Montana
- Eduardo Galvão as Alan Gudman
- Mônica Torres as Susana Aisen Gudman
- Flávio Galvão as Stefano Nicolazzi
- Thaís Melchior as Melina
- Sidney Sampaio as André Santero
- Leona Cavalli as Ariela Feld Gudman
- Emílio Orciollo Netto as Uri Gudman
- Joana Fomm as Teresa Santero
- Luíza Tomé as Letícia Santero
- Marcos Winter as Oswaldo Santero
- Rafael Sardão as Tiago Santero
- Flávia Monteiro as Sabrina Santero
- Jandir Ferrari as Felipe Santero
- Lucinha Lins as Lía Aisen
- Lisandra Souto as Estela Aisen Peixoto
- Norival Rizo as Rúben Aisen
- Cláudio Gabriel as Saulo Gudman
- Castrinho as Oziel Gudman
- Beth Zalcman as Marta Gudman
- Jussara Freire as Tamar Koheg
- Henri Pagnocelli as Gideon Koheg
- Adriana Prado as Hanna Koheg
- Raphael Sander as Noah Koheg
- Samara Felippo as Natália Menezes
- Daniela Escobar as Ângela Menezes
- Igor Cosso as Dudu Poeira
- Sandro Rocha as Henrique Peixoto
- Marcelo Valle as Dylan
- Jayme Periard as Nicanor
- Thaís Pacholek as Monique Filadélfia
- Carla Marins as Tiatira Abdul
- Nina de Pádua as Glória Solani
- Thaíssa Carvalho as Celeste Beyoncé
- Andrey Lopes as Chico Gouveia
- Roberto Birindelli as Guido Fontes
- Paulo Vilela as Wallace
- ZéCarlos Machado as Ezequiel
- Adriana Londoño as Esmirna
- Renato Livera as Zé Bento
- Adriano Garib as Tião de Deus
- Bruno Daltro as Robinson
- Augusto Zacchi as Lúcio
- Junno Andrade as Arthur Pestana
- Aline Borges as Bárbara Queiroz
- Fredy Costa as Diogo
- Pérola Faria as Brenda
- Bruno Guedes as Bruno Aisen Peixoto
- Lais Pinho as Talita Aisen Peixoto
- Ronny Kriwat as Augusto Santero Sardes
- João Bourbonnais as Lorenzo Viscone
- Jonatas Faro as Vittorio
- Nathália Costa as Ester Gudman
- Isabela Koppel as Lorena Santero Sardes

=== Special participation ===
- Carolina Oliveira as Susana (young)
- Manuela do Monte as Débora (young)
- Felipe Cunha as Adriano (young)
- Maurício Pitanga as Alan (young)
- Brendha Haddad as Hanna (young)
- Laura Kuczynski as Sabrina (young)
- Gabriel Reif as Oswaldo (young)
- Juliana Xavier as Leticia (young)
- Miguel Roncato as Felipe (young)
- Antonella Matos as Isabela (young)
- Fhelipe Gomes as Uri (young)
- Rafaela Sampaio as Estela (young)
- Guilherme Hamaceck as Saulo (young)
- Laryssa Ayres as Ariela (young)
- Yana Sardenberg as Tiatira (young)
- Gabriela Saraivah as Zoe Santero (1st phase)
- Pedrinho Mello as Benjamin Gudman (1st phase)
- Luiz Eduardo Toledo as Ricardo Montana (1st phase)
- Kadu Schons as André (1st phase)
- César Borges as César (1st phase)
- Marcelo Argenta as Luís Sardes (1st phase)
- Maytê Piragibe as Ana Sardes (1st and 2nd phase)
- Cleiton Morais as Guido Fontes (1st phase)
- Cacau Melo as Sandra
- Gilberto Hernandez as Jonathan Gudman
- Deborah Kalume as Elisa Gudman

== Production ==
Production for the telenovela began in July 2017. Sergio Marone and Guilherme Winter were the first cast members confirmed. Winter later left to star in another Record TV production and was replaced by Igor Rickli. Filming began in August 2017 and promotional videos began airing on November 10, 2017. A press conference for the telenovela was held on November 16, 2017. Between 150 and 170 episodes were confirmed.

== Ratings ==
Season	Timeslot (BRT/AMT)	Episodes	First aired		Last aired	
Season	Timeslot (BRT/AMT)	Episodes	Date	Viewers (in points)	Date	Viewers (in points)
1	Mon–Fri 8:30pm	155	November 21, 2017	13	June 25, 2018	13
