= Raposa =

- Municipality
- The Municipality of Raposa
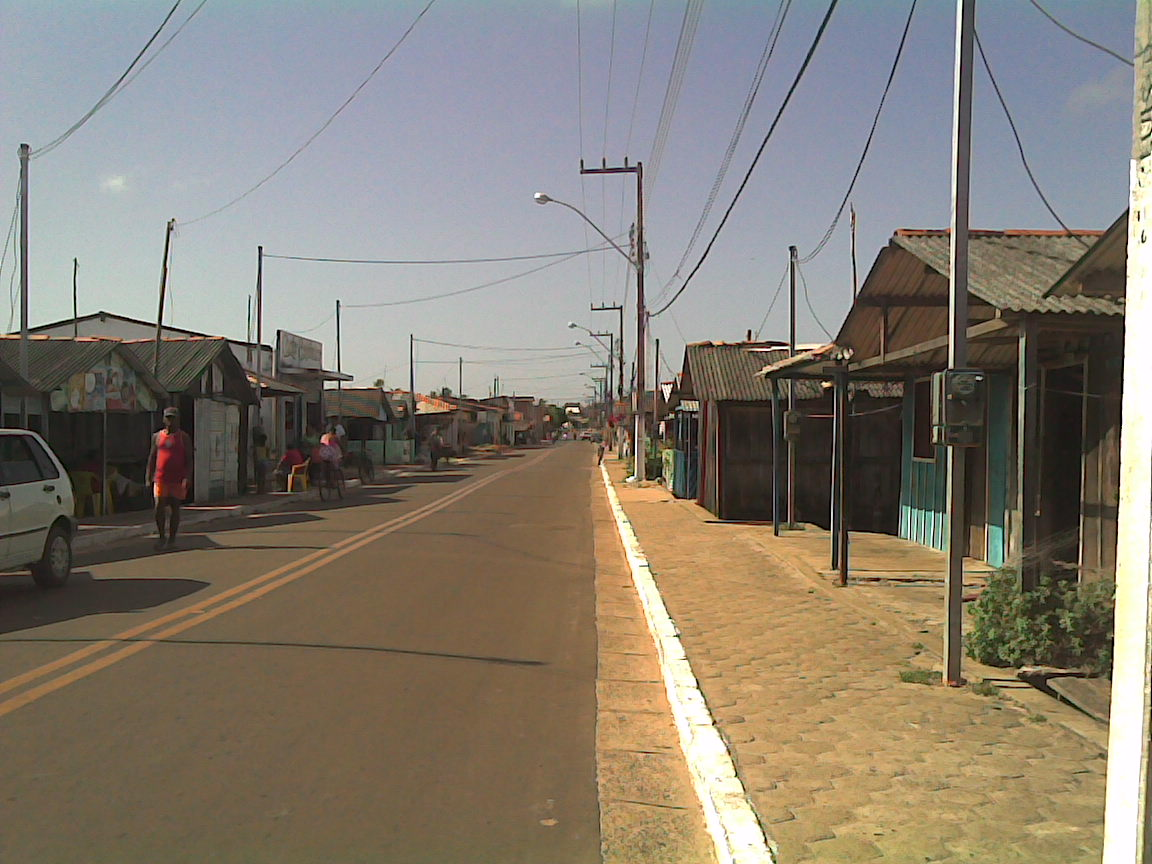
- A street in Raposa

- Flag Coat of arms

- Location of Raposa in the State of Maranhão
- Coordinates: 02°26′14″S 44°06′08″W
- Country: Brazil
- Region: Northeast
- State: Maranhão
- Founded: November 10, 1994

Government
  - Mayor: Onacy Vieira Carneiro (PP)

Area
  - Total: 64.182 km^{2} (24.781 sq mi)

Population (2020)
  - Total: 31,177
  - Density: 485.76/km^{2} (1,258.1/sq mi)
- Time zone: UTC−3 (BRT)
- HDI (2000): 0.632 – medium
- Website: www.raposa.ma.gov.br

Raposa is a municipality in the state of Maranhão in the Northeast region of Brazil. It is the smallest municipality of Maranhão.

The municipality contains part of the 1,535,310-hectare (3,793,800-acre) Upaon-Açu/Miritiba/Alto Preguiças Environmental Protection Area, created in 1992.

== See also ==
- List of municipalities in Maranhão
