= Jayme Monjardim =

Brazilian TV and film director (born 1956)

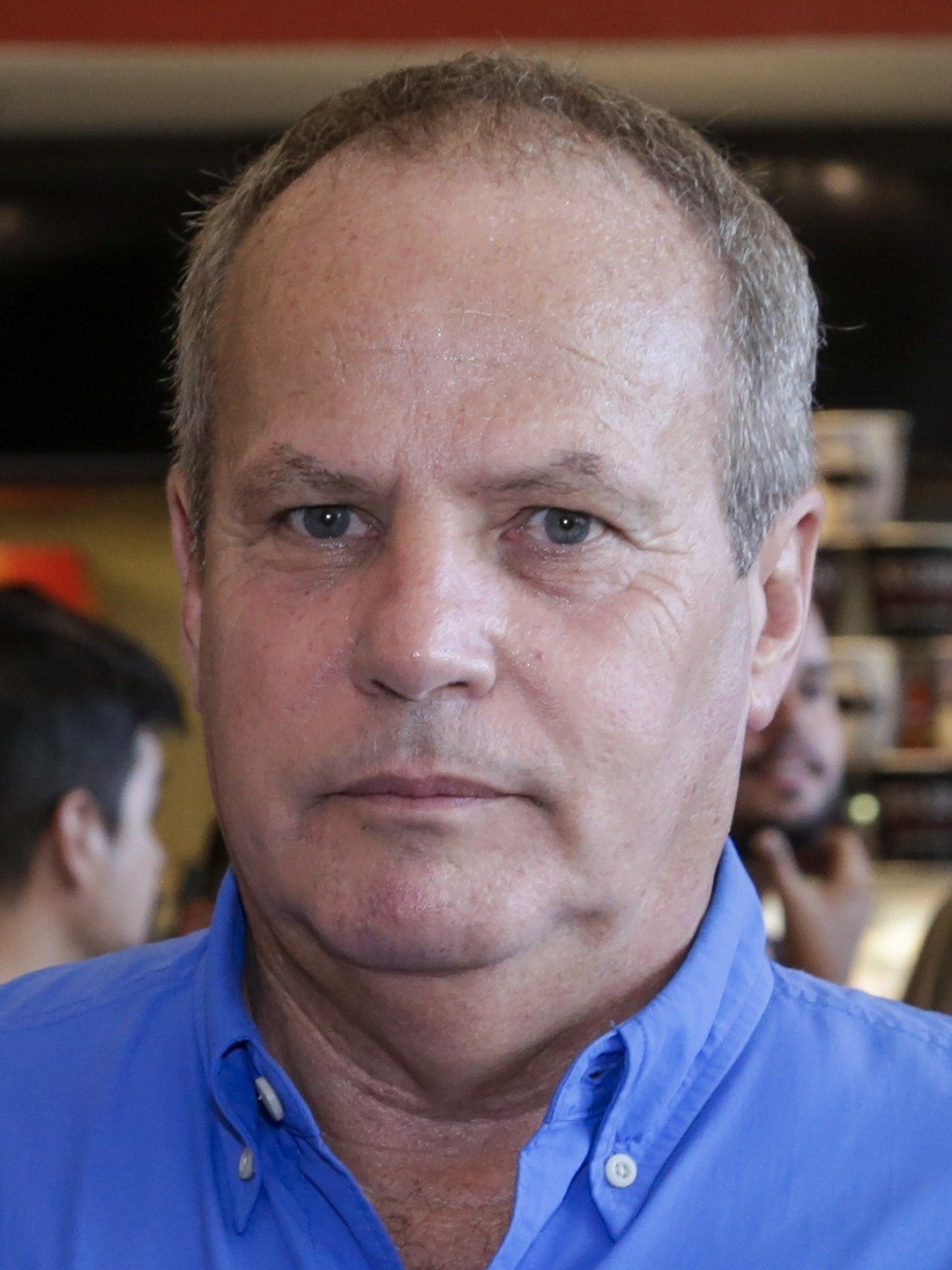
- Born: Jayme Monjardim Matarazzo; May 19, 1956; São Paulo, Brazil
- Occupations: Film and television director
- Years active: 1978–present
- Spouse(s): Fernanda Lauer (m. 19??-??) Ingra Liberato (m. 1990; div. 1995) Daniela Escobar (m. 1995; div. 2003) Tânia Mara (m. 2007)
- Children: 4, including Jayme Matarazzo Filho
- Parent(s): Maysa Matarazzo; André Matarazzo Filho

Jayme Monjardim Matarazzo (São Paulo, São Paulo, May 19, 1956) is a Brazilian TV and film director. He is the only child of André Matarazzo Filho and Maysa Matarazzo.

He is the former husband of actress Ingra Liberato, divorced without issue. He has also been married to Fernanda Lauer, with whom he had two children (Maria Fernanda Matarazzo and Jayme Matarazzo Filho). With actress Daniela Escobar, whom he married in 1995 and divorced in 2003, he had a son named André Matarazzo (born in 1998). On March 10, 2007, Jayme Monjardim married singer Tânia Mara. In September 2010, Mara gave birth to their first child, a daughter, named after Monjardim's famous mother, Maysa.

His works as TV director include the telenovelas Pantanal, Terra Nostra, O Clone, América and Viver a Vida. He also directed the film Olga.
