= Marjorie Estiano discography =

Discography of Brazilian pop singer Marjorie Estiano.

== Discography ==
Studio albums

Album Title	Album details	Peak chart positions	
Album Title	Album details	BRA	Top 40
Marjorie Estiano	Released: 5 January 2005; Label: Universal Music; Format: CD, download digital; Sales: 300,000	1	1
Flores, Amores e Blábláblá	Released: 30 April 2007; Label: Universal Music; Format: CD, download digital; Sales: 50,000	—	32
Oito	Released: 16 September 2014; Label: Independent; Format: CD, download digital; Sales: 5,000	4	—

DVDs

- 2005: Marjorie Estiano e Banda Ao Vivo (Marjorie Estiano and Band Live)
- 2006: Casa da Bossa (Bossa's Home) _{(Various artists compilation)}
- 2006: Roupa Nova's RoupAcústico 2 _{(feat. Marjorie on Flagra)}
- 2007: Cidade do Samba (City of Samba) _{(Various artists compilation)}

Singles

Year	Single	BRA	Album
2005	"Você Sempre Será"	1	Marjorie Estiano
2005	"Por Mais Que Eu Tente"	6	Marjorie Estiano
2006	"O Jogo"	12	Marjorie Estiano
2007	"Espirais"	10	Flores, Amores e BláBláBlá
2007	"Tatuagem"	15	Flores, Amores e BláBláBlá
2014	"Por Inteiro"	—	Oito
2014	"Me Leva"	—	Oito

Promo singles

- So Easy
- Versos Mudos _{(released to a few radios)}
- As Horas

=== Soundtracks ===
Year	Song	Soundtrack
2004	"Você Sempre Será", "Por Mais Que Eu Tente", "Reflexo do Amor", "Versos Mudos"	Malhação Nacional 2004
2005	"So Easy", "As Horas"	Malhação Nacional 2005
2005	"Esqueça (Forget Him)"	As Favoritas do Domingão do Faustão: Românticas (The Favorites from Domingão do Faustão: Romantic)
2006	"Wave (Vou Te Contar)"	Casa da Bossa (Bossa's Home)
2006	"Flagra" feat. Roupa Nova	Roupa Nova's RoupAcústico 2
2006	"Espirais (Remix)"	Pé na Jaca
2006	"Sob Nova Direção's Theme"	Sob Nova Direção
2006	"O Que Tiver Que Ser"	Malhação Nacional 2006
2007	"O Rap da Gaginha" feat. Ingrid Guimarães	Sob Nova Direção
2007	"Chiclete com Banana" feat. Gilberto Gil	Cidade do Samba (City of Samba)
2007	"Tatuagem"	Malhação Nacional 2007

Tours

- 2005-2006: Marjorie Estiano e Banda Ao Vivo
- 2007-2008: Turnê Bláblabla'
- 2009-2010: Combinação Sobre Todas as Coisas
- 2011: TBA

== Videos ==
Year	Track	Director	Album
2005	Você Sempre Será	Afonso Poyart	Marjorie Estiano
2005	Por Mais que eu Tente	Joana Mazzucchelli	Marjorie Estiano / Ao Vivo
2006	So Easy	Joana Mazzucchelli	Marjorie Estiano / Marjorie Estiano / Ao Vivo
2006	O Jogo	Joana Mazzucchelli	Marjorie Estiano / Ao Vivo
2006	This Love	Joana Mazzucchelli	Marjorie Estiano / Ao Vivo
2007	Espirais	Unknown	Flores, Amores e Blábláblá
2007	Tatuagem	Bruno Murtinho	Flores, Amores e Blábláblá
