= Rafael Almeida =

Rafael Almeida may refer to:

- Rafael Almeida (baseball)
- Rafael Almeida (actor)
