= Além do Tempo =

Brazilian telenovela

- Also known as: Time After Time
- Genre: Telenovela; Romance; Drama
- Created by: Elizabeth Jhin
- Written by: Elizabeth Jhin; Eliane Garcia; Lílian Garcia; Duba Elia; Vinícius Vianna; Wagner de Assis; Renata Jhin
- Directed by: Luciana Oliveira; Roberta Richard; Davi Lacerda; Pedro Vasconcellos
- Creative director: Rogério Gomes
- Starring: Alinne Moraes; Rafael Cardoso; Irene Ravache; Ana Beatriz Nogueira; Paolla Oliveira; Emilio Dantas; Felipe Camargo; Juca de Oliveira; Júlia Lemmertz; Luiz Carlos Vasconcelos; Letícia Persiles; Nívea Maria; Louise Cardoso; Carolina Kasting; Rômulo Estrela; Dani Barros; Michel Melamed
- Narrated by: Milton Gonçalves
- Opening theme: "Palavras ao Vento" by Cássia Eller
- Country of origin: Brazil
- Original language: Portuguese
- No. of episodes: 161 (100 International version)

Production
- Production locations: Bento Gonçalves, Rio Grande do Sul; Garibaldi, Rio Grande do Sul; São José dos Ausentes, Rio Grande do Sul; Vassouras, Rio de Janeiro; Rio das Flores, Rio de Janeiro
- Camera setup: Multi-camera
- Running time: 28–50 minutes
- Production company: Entretenimento Globo

Original release
- Network: Rede Globo
- Release: 13 July 2015 – 15 January 2016

Time After Time (Portuguese: Além do Tempo, lit. 'Beyond Time') is a Brazilian telenovela that premiered on 13 July 2015 and ended 15 January 2016. It is created by Elizabeth Jhin. Written by Elizabeth Jhin in conjunction with Eliane Garcia, Lílian Garcia, Duba Elia, Vinícius Vianna, Wagner de Assis and Renata Jhin; Time After Time is directed by Pedro Vasconcellos and Rogério Gomes. Starring Alinne Moraes, Rafael Cardoso, Paolla Oliveira, Ana Beatriz Nogueira, Emilio Dantas, Irene Ravache, Nívea Maria Letícia Persiles and Júlia Lemmertz.

The series was Elizabeth Jhin's fifth for Globo, and like the others used the theme of life after death. Jhin declares herself amazed at the public appetite for this topic; she identifies as a Catholic but sympathizes with Kardecist spiritism.

== Plot ==
=== First phase: Campobello ===
The first phase happens in the 19 century and portrays the history of an improbable love but so strong, that neither death nor time is capable to shake. Lívia and Felipe are of distinct social classes: She is a humble, obliged young lady that lives in the city's convent while Felipe is a noble Earl, nephew-grandson of the powerful Countess Vitória. He is about to walk down the aisle with the beautiful Melissa.

Lívia and Felipe fall passionately in love at first sight. To live this passion seems impossible. Beyond the commitment of the Earl, Lívia discovers that she is granddaughter of a Countess, the greatest enemy of her mother, who provoked the separation of Bernardo, the only son of the noblewoman. Vitória does not accept the love that her heir felt for the artist mambembe, until he decides to live with the loved one and to open hand of all his wealth.

Despaired with the attitude of her son, the Countess sends a letter to Emília saying that she is willing to accept her as a daughter-in-law. Bernardo distrusts the good intentions of his mother and goes to find Emília by himself. A great tragedy occurs on the way, and Bernardo dies. The first phase ends with Felipe and Lívia drowning making love oaths.

=== Second phase: Belarrosa ===
150 years later, all the people of Campobello, now Belarrosa, will have a second chance to redeem the errors of the past. Felipe Santarém, humble owner of a Vinícola Campobello, and Lívia Beraldini, a cultured, rich and educated young woman, will have a new possibility to live their love. Lívia is daughter to Emília, with whom they do not share a good relationship. She is also engaged to Pedro, a possessive and jealousy man. Felipe is already married to Melissa and they are parents to Alex. Melissa is a dedicated wife and left her dreams aside for Felipe despite the sorrow she caused her mother, Dorotéia. She will disclose her true colours when she discovers the love between Lívia and Felipe.

The new phase also shows the conflicts of Emília with her mother, Vitória Ventura. While a child, Emília lived in a small town in South of Italy with her mother and father, Alberto Navona. In her seventh birthday, she was abandoned by her mother and this left her traumatized. With regrets, Vitória comes back to ask for forgiveness, but her father (Alberto) fakes his death to avenge the fact that his wife ran away with another man. Now rich and powerful, Emília is owner to the Beraldini House - a company that imports wines hosted in Rio de Janeiro. On the other hand, Vitória is through a financial crisis thus decides to put her house in Belarrosa and the Vinícola Ventura on sale in order to pay her debts. For vengeance, Emília buys all her mother's properties without Vitória's knowledge that the purchaser is her own daughter and that she plans to disinherit her from the patrimony.

== Cast ==
=== First phase ===
Actor /Actress	Role
Alinne Moraes	Lívia Diffiori
Rafael Cardoso	Count Felipe Castellini
Paolla Oliveira	Melissa Borghini
Emilio Dantas	Pedro de Lucca
Ana Beatriz Nogueira	Emília "Allegra" Diffiori
Irene Ravache	Countess Vitória Castellini
Felipe Camargo	Count Bernardo Castellini
Nívea Maria	Zilda
Dani Barros	Severa Bertioga
Louise Cardoso	Gema de Lucca
Luiz Carlos Vasconcelos	Bento Silvino
Júlia Lemmertz	Dorotéia Borghini
Carlos Vereza	Father Luís
Letícia Persiles	Anita de Lucca
Rômulo Estrela	Roberto Borghini
Luís Melo	Massimo Pasqualino
Inês Peixoto	Salomé Pasqualino
Mel Maia	Felícia Cristina Pasqualino
Flora Diegues	Bianca Cristina Pasqualino
Daniela Fontan	Rita
Michel Melamed	Ariel
Carolina Kasting	Rosa Ventana
Val Perré	Raul de Assis
Caio Paduan	Afonso
Kadu Schons	Alex Castellini
João Gabriel D'Aleluia	Francisco "Chico" de Assis
Othon Bastos	The Master
Roberto Pirillo	Genaro
Norma Blum	Sister Lúcia
Wagner Santisteban	Pérsio Luís Botelho
Ana Flávia Cavalcanti	Carola
Nica Bonfim	Raimunda "Neném" Pescolato
Marcelo Torreão	Dr. Belisário Botelho
Cassiano Carneiro	Walmir Prechetis
Juca de Oliveira	Count Alberto Castellini
Elisa Brites	Countess Berenice Castellini
Saulo Arcoverde	Cícero
Gabriela di Grecco	Emília (young)
Bernardo Marinho	Count Bernardo (young)
Felipe Fagundes	Bento (young)
Thommy Schiavo	Tomás
Maria Mônica	Hermengarda
Flávio Ortiz	José
Gabriella Saraivah	Clara

=== Second phase ===
Actor/Actress	Role
Alinne Moraes	Lívia Beraldini
Rafael Cardoso	Felipe Santarém
Paolla Oliveira	Melissa Sampaio
Emilio Dantas	Pedro
Ana Beatriz Nogueira	Emília Navona Beraldini
Irene Ravache	Vitória Ventura
Luiz Carlos Vasconcelos	Bento Ventura
Júlia Lemmertz	Dorotéia Sampaio
Nívea Maria	Zilda Ventura Santarém
Felipe Camargo	Bernardo Boldrin
Dani Barros	Severa Santarém
Louise Cardoso	Gema Queiroz
Carlos Vereza	Luís Carmosino
Letícia Persiles	Anita
Caio Paduan	Afonso Santarém
Rômulo Estrela	Roberto Benini
Luís Melo	Massimo Vicenzo
Inês Peixoto	Salomé
Mel Maia	Felícia Vicenzo
Flora Diegues	Bianca Vicenzo
Daniela Fontan	Rita
Michel Melamed	Ariel
Carolina Kasting	Rosa del Cosso
Val Perré	Raul Fontana
Kadu Schons	Alex Santarém
João Gabriel D'Aleluia	Francisco "Chico"
Othon Bastos	The Master
Juca de Oliveira	Alberto Navona
Elisa Brites	Berenice Benini
Klara Castanho	Alice del Cosso Ventura
Zé Carlos Machado	Ernesto Queiroz
Maria Joana	Michele
Cadu Libonati	José Mateus Queiroz
Roberto Pirillo	Genaro Donatelli
Norma Blum	Matilde Carmosino
Wagner Santisteban	Pérsio
Ana Flávia Cavalcanti	Carola
Nica Bonfim	Raimunda "Neném" Botelho
Marcelo Torreão	Belisário Botelho
Cassiano Carneiro	Walmir
Saulo Arcoverde	Cícero
Gustavo Machado	Alberto (young)
Paula Possani	Vitória (young)
João Pedro Zappa	Bento (young)
Roberto Birindelli	Guilhermo Ventura
Isabel Gueron	Maria Benvinda Ventura
Enzo Simi	Bento (child)
Thommy Schiavo	Tomás
Maria Mônica	Hermengarda
Camilla Carandino	Solange
Caetano O'Maihlan	Marcelo
Gabriella Saraivah	Clara

== Soundtrack ==
Além do Tempo

Soundtrack album
- Released: 11 September 2015
- Genre: Various
- Length: 67:08
- Language: Portuguese
- Label: Som Livre

The official soundtrack of Além do Tempo was released on 11 September 2015 in CD and digital download formats. The cover had the protagonists Alinne Moraes and Rafael Cardoso on it. "Palavras ao Vento" by Cássia Eller directed by Rogério Gomes which is also the opening theme song was among the singles in the album.

No.	Title	Writer(s)	Purpose	Length
1.	"Palavras ao Vento"		Main theme song	3:33
2.	"Pra Você Guardei o Amor" (performed by Ana Cañas)		Gema and Raul	5:44
3.	"O Silêncio das Estrelas"			4:18
4.	"A Lua Q Eu T Dei" (performed by Herbert Vianna)			3:28
5.	"Felicidade"			4:12
6.	"De Janeiro a Janeiro"			3:12
7.	"Você é Linda"			4:54
8.	"Coração Vagabundo"			4:38
9.	"Outra Vida"		Livia and Felipe	3:13
10.	"A Idade Do Céu (La Edad Del Cielo)"			3:13
11.	"Devolva-me"	Adriana Calcanhotto	Anita and Afonso	2:37
12.	"Eu Amo Você"		Massimo	4:06
13.	"Do Amor"	Tulipa Ruiz		4:30
14.	"Tocando em Frente"		General	3:29
15.	"Sinônimos"	Chitãozinho & Xororó	Livia and Conde Felipe	6:28
16.	"Nós Dois"		Anita and Afonso	3:32
17.	"Nervos de Aço"			2:29
18.	"As Rosas Não Falam"		Emília and Bernardo	2:52
Total length:				67:08

== Reception ==
=== Ratings ===
Além do Tempo was a hit with Brazilian audiences, reaching over 173 million viewers and making a big impression on social media. The show had a total of 654,000 comments online, averaging 5,000 comments per episode.

Timeslot	# Eps.	Premiere		Finale		Rank	Season	Average viewership
Timeslot	# Eps.	Date	Viewers (in points)	Date	Viewers (in points)	Rank	Season	Average viewership
Monday–Saturday; 6:25 pm	161	13 July 2015	21	15 January 2016	22	#1	2015–16	19.8

=== Awards and nominations ===
Year	Awards	Category	Nominated work/Nominee	Result	Ref.
2015	Prêmio Extra de Televisão	Best Telenovela	Elizabeth Jhin	Nominated	
2015	Prêmio Extra de Televisão	Best Actress	Irene Ravache	Nominated	
2015	Prêmio Extra de Televisão	Best Co-starring Actress	Ana Beatriz Nogueira	Nominated	
2015	Prêmio Extra de Televisão	Best Female Revelation	Flora Diegues	Nominated	
2015	Prêmio Extra de Televisão	Best Child Actor/Actress	Mel Maia	Won	
2015	Troféu APCA	Best Telenovela	Elizabeth Jhin	Nominated	
2015	Troféu APCA	Best Actress	Irene Ravache	Nominated	
2015	Troféu APCA	Best Actor	Rafael Cardoso	Nominated	
2015	Troféu APCA	Best Director	Rogério Gomes	Nominated	
2015	Melhores do Ano	Best Actress in a Telenovela	Alinne Moraes	Nominated	
2015	Melhores do Ano	Best Actor in a Telenovela	Rafael Cardoso	Nominated	
2015	Melhores do Ano	Best Child Actor/Actress	João Gabriel D'Aleluia	Nominated	
2015	Melhores do Ano	Best Child Actor/Actress	Mel Maia	Won	
