= Desejo Proibido =

Brazilian telenovela

- Created by: Walther Negrão
- Directed by: Marcos Paulo
- Starring: Fernanda Vasconcellos; Murilo Rosa; Daniel de Oliveira; Eva Wilma; José de Abreu; Letícia Sabatella; Alexandre Borges
- Opening theme: Sonho Lindo by Tânia Mara
- Country of origin: Brazil
- Original language: Portuguese
- No. of episodes: 154

Production
- Running time: 50 minutes

Original release
- Network: TV Globo
- Release: 5 November 2007 – 2 May 2008

Desejo Proibido (English: Forbidden Desire) is a Brazilian telenovela produced and broadcast by TV Globo from 5 November 2007, to 2 May 2008.

== Cast ==
- Fernanda Vasconcellos as Laura de Castro
- Murilo Rosa as Padre Miguel Meireles
- Daniel de Oliveira as Henrique
- Eva Wilma as Cândida Novaes de Toledo
- Letícia Sabatella as Ana de Castro Fernandes
- Alexandre Borges as Dr. Antônio Escobar
- José de Abreu as Francisco Fernandes
- Pedro Neschling as Diogo
- Fernanda Paes Leme as Teresinha Mendonça
- Guilherme Berenguer as Tenente João Antônio Teixeira
- Deborah Evelyn as Madalena Borges
- Cássio Gabus Mendes as Delegate Trajano Mendonça
- Lima Duarte as Prefeito Viriato Palhares
- Nívea Maria as Magnólia Cardoso Palhares
- Grazi Massafera as Florinda Cardoso Palhares
- Rodrigo Lombardi as Ciro Feijó
- Letícia Birkheuer as Dr. Raquel Castanhal
- Caio Junqueira as Dr. Gaspar Martins
- Camila Rodrigues as Guilhermina Mendonça
- Sthefany Brito as Dulcina
- Thiago Martins as Lídio Lourenço
- Emílio Orciollo Neto as Argemiro Borges Patápio
- Júlia Lemmertz as Belinda
- Pedro Paulo Rangel as Galileu "Boticário"
- Ana Lima as Eulália Palhares Patápio
- Marcos Caruso as Padre Inácio Gouveia
- Othon Bastos as Alcebíades "Cebíade" Patápio
- Roberto Bomfim as Dioclécio
- Cláudio Marzo as Lázaro Simões
- Jandira Martini as Guaracyaba "Dona Guará"
- Eliana Fonseca as Pureza Borges Patápio "Dona Puzerinha"
- Luiz Carlos Tourinho as Anésio "Nezinho"
- Paulo César Grande as Valdenor
- Thaís Garayp as Iraci de Castro
- Osvaldo Mil as Germano
- Cosme dos Santos as Faustino
- Marcélia Cartaxo as Antonieta "Tonha"
- André Arteche as Clemente
- Nando Cunha as Soldado Brasil
- Mary Sheyla as Maria Aparecida "Cidinha" Conceição da Penha
- Gilberto Hernandez as Dr. Amilcar Noronha
- Bruna Marquezine as Maria Augusta Mendonça
- Júlia Matos as Elisa Borges Patápio
- Leonardo Rocha as Jacinto Borges Patápio
- Orã Figueiredo as Camaleão
- Cinara Leal as Doralice
- Miguel Oliveira as Tonico

== Soundtrack ==
Cover: Murilo Rosa

1. Aqui - Ana Carolina (tema de Laura e Miguel)
2. Trem das Cores - Caetano Veloso (tema de locação: Passaperto)
3. Rosa - Marisa Monte (tema de Viriato e Cândida / tema de Viriato e Magnólia)
4. Denseredo (Ao Vivo) - Roberta Sá e Boca Livre (tema de Ana)
5. Sonho Lindo - Tânia Mara (tema de abertura)
6. Amor de Índio - Roupa Nova (tema de Laura)
7. Todo Azul do Mar - 14 Bis (tema de Miguel)
8. O Trenzinho do Caipira - Boca Livre (tema geral)
9. Tamanho Não é Documento - Eduardo Dusek (tema de Nezinho)
10. Deusa da Minha Rua - Ivo Pessoa (tema de Eulália e Argemiro)
11. Céu Cor-de-rosa (Indian Summer) - Sidney Magal (tema de Florinda)
12. Danada da Preguiça - Luk Brown (tema de Alcebíades)
13. Tipo Zero - Edson Cordeiro (tema de Ciro Feijó)
14. Diabinho Maluco (Instrumental) - Joel Nascimento
15. Ave Maria - Selma Reis (tema do núcleo religioso / tema do Padre Inácio)
16. Hino Sertanejo - Tonico e Tinoco (tema de Soldado Brasil)
