= Rafael Almeida (actor) =

Brazilian actor

- Born: Rafael Araújo Almeida; 28 May 1989 (age 37); Brasília, DF, Brazil
- Education: Musicians Institute
- Occupations: Actor; singer; songwriter; director; producer
- Years active: 2006–present
- Relatives: Tânia Mara (sister)

Rafael Araújo Almeida (born 28 May 1989) is a Brazilian actor, director, producer, and singer-songwriter. In addition to acting in several telenovelas, he works as a director in his own video production company, RA3 Filmes. He currently lives in Orlando, Florida.

== Career ==
He made his television debut on the soap opera Páginas da Vida, playing the pianist Luciano. Soon after, he starred in the fifteenth season of Malhação, in addition to acting on other TV series and telenovelas of Rede Globo. Almeida began his career as a director and founded the video producer RA3 Filmes where he directed video clips of great Brazilian and international music artists, as well as several advertising campaigns. Parallel to the career of actor and director; Rafael also invests in his singing career.

He released his first album as a singer in 2013 by the record company Som Livre, with music production by Rogério Vaz and had two of his songs in soundtracks of soap operas of Rede Globo. In the album "Bungee Jump", Rafael duels with the Brazilian singer Maria Gadú, in the song "Grande Angular".

In 2014 he lived in Los Angeles where he studied at the Musicians Institute, one of the largest music conservatories in the United States. Currently, he has released for "Livre Livre" an EP called "Rio California", produced by Juliano Cortuah.

== Filmography ==
=== Television ===
Year	Title	Role	Notes
2006	Páginas da Vida	Luciano	
2007–09	Malhação	Gustavo Bergantin (Guga)	Season 15
2008	Dança dos Famosos	Participant	Season 5
2009	TV Globinho	Apresentador	
2009	Por Toda Minha Vida	Raul Seixas	Episode: "Raul Seixas"
2011	Acampamento de Férias	Léo	Season 2
2011	A Vida da Gente	Miguel	
2013	Flor do Caribe	Rodolpho Rosemberg (Paçoquinha)	
2017	O Rico e Lázaro	Hurzabum	

=== Cinema ===
Year	Title	Role	Notes
2007	Bridge to Terabithia	Jesse Aarons	Dubbing
2014	Os Tubarões de Copacabana	Francisco	

== Theater ==
Year	Title	Role
2007	Lembranças de um Sonho	Sr. Flores
2010	Garotos	
2012	Enlace - A Loja do Ourives	Adok
2012–13	A Princesinha	Ram Dass

== Discography ==
=== Studio albums ===
Lista de álbuns
Album	Details
Vem Jogar	Release: 19 August 2013; Formats: CD, digital download; Record company: Som Livre

=== Extended plays (EPs) ===
Lista de álbuns
Album	Details
Rio California	Release: 29 June 2015; Formatos: EP, digital download; Record company: Som Livre

=== Singles ===
Title	Year	Album
"Bungee Jump"	2013	Vem Jogar
"Vem Jogar"	2015	Vem Jogar
"Rio Califórnia"	2015	Rio Califórnia

== Awards and nominations ==
Year	Award	Category	Work	Results
2007	Prêmio Contigo! de TV	Most Promising Actor	Páginas da Vida	Nominated
