= Sthefany Brito =

Brazilian actress (born 1987)

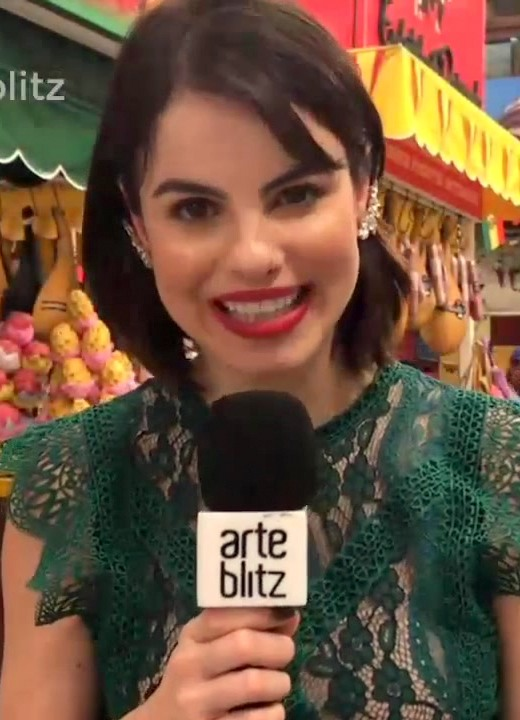
- Brito in 2019
- Born: Sthefany Fernandes de Brito; 19 June 1987 (age 38); São Paulo, Brazil
- Occupation: Actress
- Years active: 1999–present
- Spouses: Alexandre Pato (m. 2009; div. 2010) Igor Raschkovsky (m. 2018)
- Children: 1
- Relatives: Kayky Brito (brother)

Sthefany Fernandes de Brito (born 19 June 1987) is a Brazilian actress.

== Career ==
Brito was born Sthefany Fernandes de Brito in São Paulo, Brazil, on 19 June 1987. She had studied theatre since 1995, and she appeared in television adverts for toys and children's products.

She was cast in her first television role in 1999 in the Brazilian version of Chiquititas, as Hannelore. She played Hannelore from 1999 to 2000. In 2001 she also landed a role in the telenovela Um Anjo Caiu do Céu and many others.

In 2001 Sthefany was hired to play an angel in the soap opera Dorinha. In 2002, she acted in O Clone as a Muslim girl. In 2003, she hosted the TV show TV Globinho.

In the theatre in Rio de Janeiro in 2002 she played a teenager in The Rebellious Beginning. The next year she and her brother Kayky Brito worked together in The Animal - The Natural Order of Things. In 2005, she acted in the Leo musical comedy as Bia. In 2006 she played a more mature role in the soap opera Páginas da Vida, where she played a character named Kelly. It was the first time she was featured in love scenes.

== Personal life ==
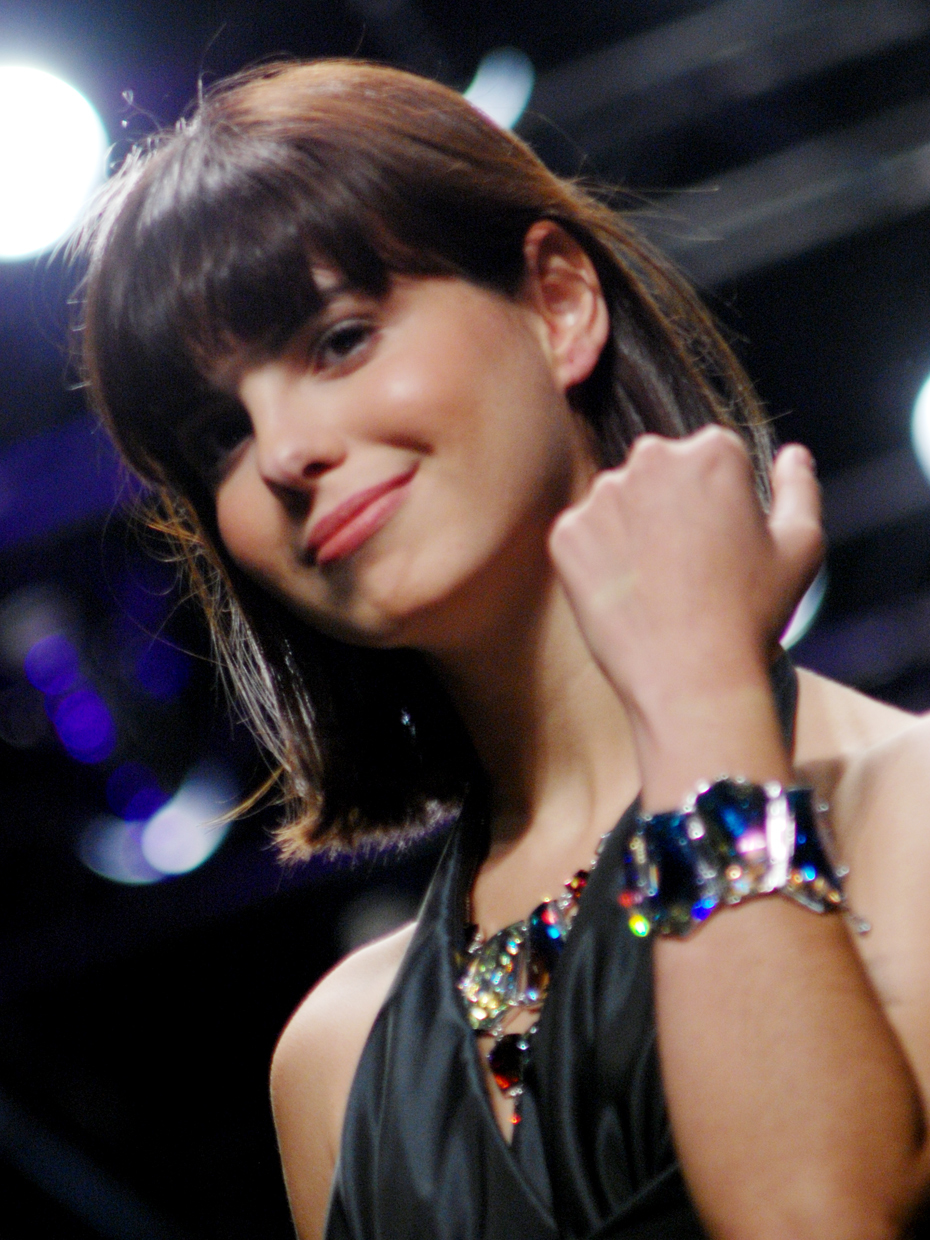
Sthefany Brito (2008)

Her last telenovela was Amor Sem Igual in 2019. She had a short marriage to a footballer, Alexandre Pato.

In 2018, she married a lawyer of Russian origin Igor Raschkovsky.

November 1, 2020, she gave birth to her first child Enrico.

== Filmography ==
=== Television ===
- Chiquititas Brasil (1999–2000)
- Um Anjo Caiu do Céu (2001)
- O Clone (2001–2002)
- TV Globinho (2003)
- Agora É que São Elas (2003)
- Começar de Novo (2004–2005)
- Páginas da Vida (2006–2007)
- Carga Pesada (2007)
- Desejo Proibido (2007–2008)
- Macho Man (2011)
- A Vida da Gente (2011–2012)
- Dança dos Famosos 9 (2012)
- Flor do Caribe (2013)
- O Rico e Lázaro (2017)
- Jezabel (2019)
- Amor Sem Igual (2019-2020)

=== Film ===
- Remissão (2004)
- As Vidas de Maria (2005)
- Senhor dos Ladrões (2006)
- Mistéryos (2008)

=== Theatre ===
- Noviça Rebelde (2002)
- É o Bicho! A ordem natural das coisas (2003)
- Mágico de Oz (2004)
- História de São Vicente (2004)
- Léo e Bia 1973 (2005)
