= Fernanda de Freitas =

Brazilian actress

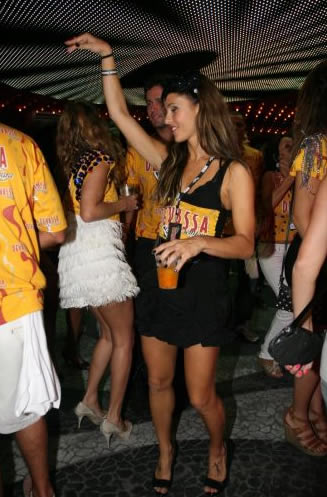
- de Freitas in 2011
- Born: Fernanda de Freitas Sahdo; February 25, 1980 (age 46); São José do Rio Preto, São Paulo, Brazil
- Occupation: Actress
- Years active: 1999–present

Fernanda de Freitas Sahdo (born February 25, 1980) is a Brazilian actress.

== Career ==
Fernanda was a ballet teacher for 14 years. At age 19, she quit the gym where she worked as a ballet teacher and left her hometown of São José do Rio Preto, São Paulo, to go and live in Rio de Janeiro. In Rio, she began her career as one of the Zodiac Girls Planeta Xuxa program in 2000. She has done numerous advertising campaigns, working as a Ford agency model and studying theater at Casa de Arte das Laranjeiras.

She has made the cover of Melee and did a test site for the Paparazzo.

Fernanda debuted as an actress in the Coração de Estudante, the role of Heloísa. Then in 2003 she took over the presentation of TV Globinho, along with other actresses.

On television, Fernando de Freitas also participated, novels Kubanacan (2003), Como uma Onda (2004), Bang Bang (2005), Pé na Jaca (2006), Negócio da China (2008).

The actress was in the A Turma do Didi, in the Malhação series, Casos e Acasos (2008), S.O.S. Emergência (2009/2010), in the special Por Toda a Minha Vida (2008), in the program Cilada (2009), in the miniseries Decamerão - A Comédia do Sexo (2009), Programa Piloto (2009).

In film, Fernanda debuted in Cidade Baixa (2005). Then he Zuzu Angel (2006), Tropa de Elite (2007), A Casa da Mãe Joana (2008), of Malu de Bicicleta (2011).

In the theater, Fernanda de Freitas served on A Ver Estrelas (2008).

In 2011, Fernanda de Freitas on the show Tapas & Beijos and continues to play Ensina-me a Viver, on display since 2008.

== Filmography ==
=== Television ===
Year	Title	Role	Notes
1999	Terra Nostra	Zuca	Participation
2000	Planeta Xuxa	Zodiac Girls	
2002	Coração de Estudante	Heloísa	
2003	TV Globinho	Presenter	
2003	Kubanacan	Consuelo Tallavera	
2004	Como uma Onda	Amanda	
2005	Cilada	Tati	Episode: "Motel"
2005	Bang Bang	Catty Mcgold	
2006	A Turma do Didi		Special participation
2006	Pé na Jaca	Lilinha (Leila Barra)	
2007	Malhação	Francesca (Fran)	
2008	Por Toda a Minha Vida	Valéria Zopello	Episode: "Mamonas Assassinas"
2008	Casos e Acasos	Joana	Episode: "O Triângulo, a Tia Raquel e o Pedido"
2008	Casos e Acasos	Maria Cecília	Episode: "O Trote, o Filho e o Fora"
2008	A Favorita	Luana	Participation
2008	Negócio da China	Antonella Bertazzi	
2009	Decamerão - A Comédia do Sexo	Belisa	Episode: "O Ciúme"
2010	Programa Piloto	Fabiana	
2010	S.O.S. Emergência	Dra. Evelin	
2011	Tapas & Beijos	Flavinha	2011–2015
2012	A História do Amor	Various characters	
2013	Junto & Misturado	Fernanda	
2021	Um Lugar ao Sol	Erica	

=== Film ===
Year	Title	Role
2005	Cidade Baixa	Nilma
2006	Zuzu Angel	Ana Angel
2007	Tropa de Elite	Roberta
2008	A Casa da Mãe Joana	Tainacã
2011	Malu de Bicicleta	Malu

=== Theater ===
Year	Title	Role
2008	A Ver Estrelas	Bruxa
2008	Ensina-me a Viver	Dora Alegria/Nancy Mercury/Silvia Gazela
