= Páginas da Vida (Brazilian TV series) =

Brazilian telenovela

- Genre: Telenovela; Family drama; Slice of life
- Created by: Manoel Carlos
- Written by: Manoel Carlos; Fausto Galvão; Maria Carolina; Juliana Peres; Ângela Chaves; Daisy Chaves
- Directed by: Jayme Monjardim; Fabrício Mamberti; Teresa Lampreia; Frederico Mayrink; Luciano Sabino
- Starring: Regina Duarte; Lília Cabral; Fernanda Vasconcellos; Marcos Caruso; Ana Paula Arósio; Thiago Rodrigues; José Mayer; Regiane Alves; Joana Mocarzel; Gabriel Kaufmann
- Theme music composer: Tom Jobim
- Opening theme: "Wave" by Tom Jobim
- Ending theme: "Wave" by Daniel Jobim & Luiza Jobim
- Composer: Alberto Rosenblit
- Country of origin: Brazil
- Original language: Portuguese
- No. of episodes: 203

Production
- Producer: Guilherme Bokel
- Production locations: Rio de Janeiro; Amsterdam
- Cinematography: Adriano Valentim
- Editors: José Carlos Monteiro; Ubiraci de Motta; Paulo Jorge Correia; Luiz Eduardo Guimarães
- Camera setup: Multi-camera
- Running time: 29–101 minutes
- Production company: Central Globo de Produção

Original release
- Network: Rede Globo
- Release: 10 July 2006 – 2 March 2007

Páginas da Vida (English: Pages of Life) is a Brazilian telenovela produced and broadcast by Rede Globo from 10 July 2006 to 2 March 2007 in 203 episodes.

It stars Regina Duarte, Lília Cabral and Fernanda Vasconcellos in the lead roles.

Lília Cabral was nominated in 2007 for best actress in the International Emmy Awards for her role as Marta.

== Premise ==
The story is divided into two phases: the first occurs in 2001. This phase lasts for the first 38 episodes of the telenovela. The second phase takes place in the present (2006), showing the characters' lives five years after the death of Nanda, and life of the twins.

== Cast ==
Actor	Character
Regina Duarte	Helena Camargo Varella
Lília Cabral	Marta Toledo Flores
Fernanda Vasconcellos	Nanda (Fernanda Toledo Flores)
Thiago Rodrigues	Léo (Leonardo Maia de Almeida)
Marcos Caruso	Alex (Alexandre Flores)
Ana Paula Arósio	Olívia Fragoso Martins de Andrade Duarte
Edson Celulari	Sílvio Duarte
Natália do Vale	Carmem Fragoso Martins de Andrade Lobo
José Mayer	Greg (Gregório Rodrigues Lobo)
Thiago Lacerda	Jorge Fragoso Martins de Andrade
Danielle Winits	Sandra Ribeiro
Vivianne Pasmanter	Isabel Fernandes
Caco Ciocler	Renato Martins
Regiane Alves	Alice Miranda de Vilela Arruda
Leandra Leal	Sabrina Marcondes
Marcos Paulo	Diogo de Carvalho
Sônia Braga	Tônia Werneck
Tarcísio Meira	Tide (Aristides Martins de Andrade)
Glória Menezes	Lalinha (Amália Fragoso Martins de Andrade)
Letícia Sabatella	Sister Lavínia
Deborah Evelyn	Anna Maria Saraiva
Helena Ranaldi	Márcia Fragoso Martins de Andrade Pinheiro
Walderez de Barros	Constância Ribeiro
Ângela Leal	Hilda Nascimento
Ana Botafogo	Elisa Fragoso Martins de Andrade Telles
Grazi Massafera	Thelminha (Thelma Ribeiro)
Christine Fernandes	Simone Bueno
Tato Gabus Mendes	Leandro Fragoso Martins de Andrade
Renata Sorrah	Tereza Junqueira de Figueiredo
Nathalia Timberg	Hortência Miranda de Almeida Vilela Arruda
Antônio Calloni	Gustavo Pinheiro de Sousa
Elisa Lucinda	Selma Araújo
André Frateschi	Dorival
Louise Cardoso	Diana Salles Martins de Andrade
Ângelo Antônio	Miroel Saraiva
Umberto Magnani	Zé (José Ribeiro)
Susana Ribeiro	Suzy
Marly Bueno	Sister Maria (Bad sister)
Bete Mendes	Sister Natércia
Sidney Sampaio	Vinícius Pessoa
Buza Ferraz	Ivan Monteiro Telles
Eduardo Lago	Bira (Ubirajara Rangel)
Marjorie Estiano	Marina Martins de Andrade Rangel
Sílvia Salgado	Verônica Toledo Mattos
Luciano Chirolli	Eliseu Mattos
Luma Costa	Francis
Ana Furtado	Lívia Ferreira Martins
Sthefany Brito	Kelly Toledo Mattos
Zé Carlos Machado	Nestor Figueiredo
Zé Victor Castiel	Machadão
Miguel Lunardi	Gabriel
Xuxa Lopes	Belita (Isabel Ferreira)
Paulo César Grande	Lucas Azevedo
Claudia Mauro	Angélica Cunha
Fernando Eiras	Rubinho (Rubens Bueno)
Henrique César	Dr. Moretti
Inez Viana	Sister Fátima
Joelson Medeiros	Domingos
Lucci Ferreira	Horácio
Lígia Cortez	Cecília
Duda Nagle	Fred
Selma Reis	Sister Zenaide
Max Fercondini	Sérgio Toledo Flores
Jorge de Sá	Salvador Fortunato
Narjara Turetta	Inesita
Domingos Meira	Ulisses
Luana Carvalho	Lili
Manuela do Monte	Nina Martins de Andrade Pinheiro
Nina Morena	Vandinha
Thiago Picchi	Marcelo Nascimento
Hylka Maria	Odete
Flávia Pucci	Dra. Juliana
Luciele di Camargo	Camila Fragoso Martins de Andrade
Ana Carolina Dias	Maria
Bruno Padilha	Saldanha
Quitéria Chagas	Dorinha
Pedro Neschling	Rafael Salles Martins de Andrade
Thalita Carauta	Lídia
Daniela Galli	Dra. Marília
Lú Mendonça	Mônica
Carolina Bezerra	Margareth
Juana Garibaldi	Adriana
Sabrina Rosa	Célia
Bruce Gomlevsky	Bruce
Júlia Carrera	Tatiana
Rafael Almeida	Luciano Junqueira de Figueiredo
Pérola Faria	Gisele Saraiva
Sophie Charlotte	Joyce
Armando Babaioff	Felipe Martins de Andrade Telles
Marcos Henrique	Pinhão
Carolina Oliveira	Gabi (Gabriela Cunha Azevedo)
Joana Mocarzel	Clarinha (Clara Camargo Varella)
Gabriel Kaufmann	Francisco Toledo de Almeida
Rachel de Queiroz	Gisele (child)

== Reception ==
=== Ratings ===
Timeslot	Episodes	Premiere		Finale		Rank	Season	Average viewership
Timeslot	Episodes	Date	Viewers (in points)	Date	Viewers (in points)	Rank	Season	Average viewership
Mondays—Saturdays; 8:55pm	203	10 July 2006	50	3 March 2007	53	#1	2006-07	47

== Remake ==
An remake of Páginas da Vida was announced in August 2025, being the forth co-production between SIC and TV Globo, that premiered in Portugal in 23 February 2026.

After some failed attempts by Daniel Oliveira, SIC's program director, to make another telenovela collab with Globo's co-production, that dream only came true in June 2025 when both renewed their partnership, with more production of new remakes of historic Globo telenovelas being announced too. The initial plan would be to adapt Avenida Brasil, but due to lack of budget the channel had to choose to adapt the synopsis of other telenovelas, including Páginas da Vida, Vale Tudo, Rainha da Sucata and O Rei do Gado. The final choice was Páginas da Vida, with Sandra Santos and Alexandre Castro in charge of the adaptation.
