= Miguel Rômulo =

Brazilian actor (born 1992)

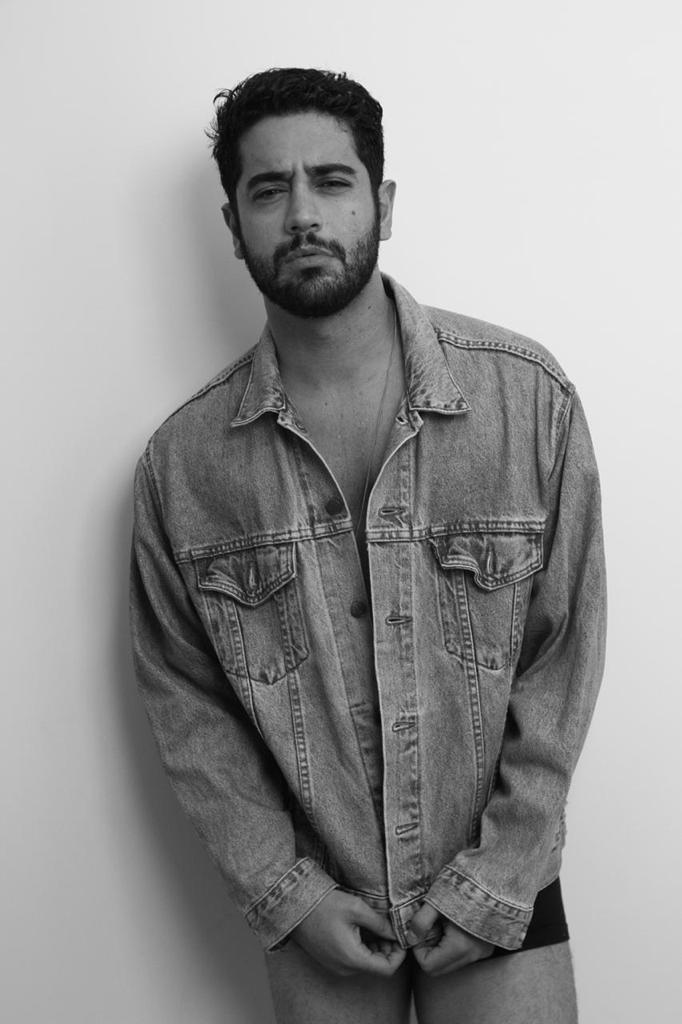
- Born: Miguel Rômulo Peixoto Vita; April 27, 1992 (age 34); Rio de Janeiro, Brazil
- Occupations: Actor; presenter
- Years active: 2002–present

Miguel Rômulo Peixoto Vita (27 April 1992) is a Brazilian actor known for his role as Shiva in A Favorita and Felipe in Caras & Bocas.

== Biography ==
With 19 years in Rede Globo, his television debut was the telenovela Coração de Estudante (2002). Since then, he has continued with success. He took part in Celebridade (2003), Senhora do Destino (2004), and Pé na Jaca (2006). Since then, he played the role of Marquinhos, a boy who carried the trauma of being abandoned by his father. While playing Shiva, in the romance A Favorita, he earned the prize of best new actor on Melhores do Ano in 2008.

In 2013, he interpreted Décio in the Emmy International award-winning telenovela, Joia Rara. In 2018, he was part of the romance Orgulho e Paixão, where he played Ranfoldo Vasconcelos and in Malhação-Vidas Brasileiras, as Marcos. His last telenovela appearance was in 2019, where he played as Sabrina, a drag queen, in Verão 90.

The Netflix film Tudo Bem No Natal Que Vem was launched in December 2020 and is his first work in a streaming platform.

== Filmography ==
=== Television ===
Year	Title	Role	Notes
2002	Coração de Estudante	André	
2003	Celebridade	Sadi	
2004	Senhora do Destino	Reginaldo Ferreira da Silva (young)	Episodes: "28–30 de junho"
2005	A História de Rosa	Zeca (young)	Year-end special
2006	Pé na Jaca	Marcos Lancelotti (Marquinhos)	
2008	A Favorita	Shiva Lenin Costa	
2009	Caras & Bocas	Felipe	
2010	TV Globinho	Presenter	
2011	Cordel Encantado	Cícero Bezerra	
2012	Amor Eterno Amor	Bruno Gonçalves	
2013	A Grande Família	Tuco (young)	Episode: "De Volta Para o Passado"
2013	Joia Rara	Décio Passos	
2014	A Grande Família	Tuco (young)	Episode: "O Baile" Episode: "Um Conto da Copa"
2016	Êta Mundo Bom!	Joaquim José Pereira Filho (Quincas)	
2018	Orgulho e Paixão	Randolfo Vasconcellos	
2018	Malhação: Vidas Brasileiras	Marcos Almeida (Marquinhos)	Episode: "2–30 de novembro"
2019	Verão 90	Sabrina	
2024	Renascer	Décio	
2025	Êta Mundo Melhor!	Joaquim Pereira Torres Filho "Quincas"	
2026	Dona Beja	Father Otávio Ribeiro	

=== Cinema ===
Year	Title	ROle
2007	Os Porralokinhas	Bena
2020	Tudo Bem no Natal Que Vem	Leo

== Prizes and nominations ==
Year	Festival	Category	Nomination	Outcome	Ref.
2005	Prêmio Contigo! de TV	Melhor Ator Infantil	Senhora do Destino	Nominated	
2008	Melhores do Ano	Melhor Ator Revelação	A Favorita	Won	
2008	Prêmio UOL e PopTevê de Televisão	Melhor Ator Revelação	A Favorita	Won	
2009	Prêmio Contigo! de TV	Melhor Ator Coadjuvante	Caras & Bocas	Nominated	
