= O Concurso =

2013 film directed by Pedro Vasconcellos

- Theatrical release poster
- Directed by: Pedro Vasconcellos
- Written by: L.G. Tubaldini Jr. Leonardo Levis
- Starring: Fábio Porchat; Sabrina Sato; Carol Castro; Danton Mello
- Edited by: Renato Martins
- Production company: Filmeland
- Distributed by: Downtown Filmes; Paris Filmes
- Release date: 19 July 2013
- Running time: 86 minutes
- Country: Brazil
- Language: Portuguese

O Concurso is a 2013 Brazilian comedy film directed by Pedro Vasconcellos. The film was released in Brazil on July 19, 2013.

== Cast ==
- Danton Mello as Caio
- Fábio Porchat as Rogério Carlos
- Rodrigo Pandolfo as Bernardinho
- Anderson Di Rizzi as Freitas
- Sabrina Sato as Martinha Pinéu
- Jackson Antunes as pai Rogério's father
- Pedro Paulo Rangel
- Nelson Freitas as Pai Preto
- Carol Castro as Mariana
- Érico Brás as Drag Queen
- Oscar Calixto as Drag Queen
