= Amor Eterno Amor =

- Also known as: Love Eternal Love
- Genre: Telenovela
- Created by: Elizabeth Jhin
- Written by: Denise Bandeira; Duba Elia; Eliane Garcia; Lílian Garcia; Renata Jhin
- Directed by: Pedro Vasconcelos; Rogério Gomes
- Starring: Gabriel Braga Nunes; Letícia Persiles; Cássia Kis Magro; Carmo Dalla Vecchia; Mayana Neiva; Ana Lúcia Torre; Luís Melo; Osmar Prado; Denise Weinberg; Felipe Camargo; Carolina Kasting; Giulia Gam; Laila Zaid; Andreia Horta; Marcelo Faria
- Opening theme: "Leva-me pra Lua" by Ana Caram
- Country of origin: Brazil
- Original language: Portuguese
- No. of episodes: 161

Production
- Running time: 50 minutes

Original release
- Network: TV Globo
- Release: March 5 – September 7, 2012

Amor Eterno Amor (Love, Eternal Love) is a Brazilian telenovela produced by TV Globo and exhibited in the schedule of 18 hours. Written by Elizabeth Jhin and directed by Roberta Richards, Fábio Strazzer, Luciana Oliveira Paulo Ghelli, Pedro Vasconcelos and Rogério Gomes, it was released on March 5, 2012, ending on September, 7 of the same year, replacing A Vida da Gente.

== Plot ==
At age 10, Carlos fled the interior of Minas Gerais, tired of the abuse of his stepfather Virgílio. Carlos had the special ability to tame animals with a gesture or look, which Virgílio exploited to make money. After running away, alone and lost on the road, the boy met Xavier, a charitable truck driver who took him to the Island of Marajó, in Pará. Carlos became his adopted son.

Years passed. Carlos became an attractive man and competent buffalo herder. Known in the neighborhood by the nickname Barão (Baron), for his intelligence and skill, he catches the eye of Valeria, the daughter of local traders, who refuses to accept that he does not return her affections.

Carlos remains infatuated with the memory of a childhood sweetheart. Before he ran away from home, Carlos fell in love with his neighbor, Elisa. Playing together, they fell into an innocent childhood love and promised to love each other forever and get married one day, when they were grown. But when he ran away they were separated, and so many years passed that even if he were to meet Elisa again he would probably not recognize her.

In the city of Rio de Janeiro, meanwhile, Verbena Borges, a kindly millionaire and widow of one of the biggest businessmen in Rio, even ill and near death, searches for her only son, Rodrigo, who disappeared more than 20 years ago. Verbena never understood whether the boy was kidnapped or ran away, without even suspecting that her former husband, Virgílio, had anything to do with it.

Verbena's sister Melissa does not want Verbena to rediscover the child, for inheritance reasons. In the search for her heir, Verbena also has the help of the two daughters of her physician, Dr. Gabriel: Clara, a sensitive girl with telepathic powers, and Miriam, a beautiful journalist, who falls in love with Carlos without ever suspecting that he is in fact Rodrigo Borges, Verbena's missing son.

== Cast ==
Actor	Role
Gabriel Braga Nunes	Rodrigo Prado Borges (Carlos de Sousa "Barão")
Letícia Persiles	Miriam Allende
Carmo Dalla Vecchia	Fernando Prado Sobral
Mayana Neiva	Elisa Campos/Maria do Amparo
Cássia Kis	Melissa Prado Sobral
Ana Lúcia Torre	Verbena Prado Borges
Luís Melo	Dimas Sobral
Osmar Prado	Virgílio de Souza
Felipe Camargo	Gabriel Allende
Carolina Kasting	Beatriz Mainardi
Andréia Horta	Valéria
Giulia Gam	Laura Belize
Marcelo Faria	Kleber Gonçalves
Suzy Rêgo	Jaqueline Menezes Gonçalves (Jaque)
Rosi Campos	Teresa
André Gonçalves	Pedro Fonseca
Carol Castro	Jacira da Silva
Erom Cordeiro	Tobias da Silva
Raphael Viana	Josué
Carlos Vereza	Francisco Mainardi Chaves
Pedro Paulo Rangel	Zé
Othon Bastos	Lexor
Suely Franco	Dona Zilda
Vera Mancini	Carmem
Marina Ruy Barbosa	Juliana Pietrini
Miguel Rômulo	Bruno Gonçalves
Reginaldo Faria	Augusto Prado Borges
Maria Clara Mattos	Regina Ferraz
Denise Weinberg	Angélica de Sousa
Daniela Fontan	Gracinha
Nuno Leal Maia	Ribamar
Nica Bonfim	Deolinda
Tony Tornado	Antônio
Murilo Grossi	Henrique Pietrini
Hermylla Guedes	Marlene
Otávio Martins	Gil Menezes
Camila Amado	Dona Olga
Laila Zaid	Priscila Belize
Rosane Gofman	Valdirene
Olivia Torres	Gabi Allende
Klara Castanho	Clara Allende
Flávia Garrafa	Gilda Tavares
Mariana Molina	Cris (Cristina Mainardi)
Lincoln Tornado	Jair
Gilberto Torres	Mauro Tavares
Jéssika Alves	Laís
Bernardo Marinho	Beto
Luiza Gonzalez	Michele Ferraz
Rafael Gevu	Júnior
Luis Augusto Formal	João
Adelaide de Castro	Tatiana Gonçalves
Larissa Vereza	Kátia
Igor Cosso	Julinho
José Bittencourt	Uilha
Flávia Reis	Divina
Paula Barbosa	Débora
Paula Loffler	Flavinha
