= Letícia Persiles =

Brazilian actress and singer

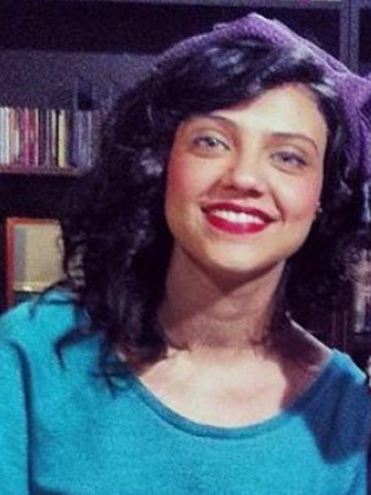
- Persiles in 2013
- Born: 2 January 1983 (age 43); Rio de Janeiro, Brazil
- Occupations: Actress; singer
- Years active: 1994–present
- Children: 1

Letícia Persiles (Portuguese: [leˈtʃisiɐ peʁˈsilis]; born 2 January 1983) is a Brazilian actress and singer who played the lead role in the telenovela Amor Eterno Amor.

== Biography ==
Born in Rio de Janeiro, Letícia Persiles has a son with her husband, the director Luiz Fernando Carvalho, who she met for the first time during the filming of the 2008 miniseries Capitu.

== Career ==
=== Acting career ===
She played the teenage Capitu in the Rede Globo miniseries Capitu, based on the book Dom Casmurro, by Brazilian writer Machado de Assis. Letícia Persiles played the lead role in the 2012 telenovela Amor Eterno Amor as the journalist Miriam Allende, who is the main romantic interest of the character played by Gabriel Braga Nunes. Letícia Persiles replaced Carol Castro, who was originally cast to play the lead role of the telenovela. She plays Alinne Moraes best friend, Anita, in the 2015 telenovela Além do Tempo.

=== Singing career ===
Letícia Persiles is the vocalist of the band Manacá.

== Filmography ==
=== Television ===
Television
Year	Title	Role
2008	Capitu	Young Capitolina "Capitu" Pádua
2012	Amor Eterno Amor	Miriam Allende
2014	A Segunda Vez	Carla
2015	Além do Tempo	Anita

=== Cinema ===
Cinema
Year	Title	Role
2014	Clareando	Clara
2015	Dona do Paraíso	Alex
2016	Moto Anjos	Lilian
