= Eric Surita =

Emilio Eric Paulo Sköldberg Surita, better known as Eric Surita (and previously known as Emilio Eric; born 28 May 1992), is a Brazilian radio announcer, television presenter, and former actor.

== Early life ==
Emilio Eric Paulo Sköldberg Surita was born on 28 May 1992 in São Paulo as the son of Swedish-born Anne "Pepela" Sköldberg and Emílio Surita, who is a Brazilian. He is the older brother of radio jockey Eduardo Surita.

In 2010, Eric Surita began studying journalism, but dropped out the following year to devote himself exclusively to the performing arts program at TV Globo's actors' workshop.

== Career ==
Eric Surita began his artistic career working as a photographic model, gaining recognition for his time as a "Colírio" ("Eye Candy") boy for Capricho magazine. He also maintained a football blog called Muleque F.C.

Eric Surita gained national recognition in 2011, when he conceived and hosted the interactive radio program iPan on Jovem Pan, along with his brother Eduardo. The program allowed listeners to call in and choose the day's news and music, as well as ask questions of interview guests.

Eric Surita made his television debut as a presenter on TV Globinho, a children's program on Rede Globo, alongside Letícia Navas. The pair presented the programme for nearly a year in a revamped format that featured topics designed to stimulate the curiosity of young viewers. Eric Surita and Letícia Navas were the final hosts of the program before it went off air.

== Personal life ==
On 20 July 2020, during an interview with Maurício Meirelles and Renato Albani on the radio program Stand UP Jovem Pan, Eric Surita revealed that he is bisexual and stated that when he decided to "come out of the closet," his father expelled him from the family home. He said that he lived away from home for two years and received support only from his mother during that period.

A week later, he used Instagram Stories to post a clarification in which he said he would not be giving interviews about the incident, explaining: "Our family has always been very private regarding public appearances and social media when it comes to personal and private matters, so I ask that our space be respected as well. We have always resolved issues internally within the family." He also stated that he considers the topic important and believes it should be discussed using sociological and behavioral arguments that are more informed and substantial than his own personal experiences.

== Filmography ==
=== Television ===
| Year | Title | Role | Network |
|---|---|---|---|
| 2010 | Colírios Capricho | Co-presenter | MTV Brasil |
| 2011-2012 | TV Globinho | Co-presenter | Rede Globo |
| 2012 | Aventuras do Didi | Special participant | Rede Globo |
| 2013-2015 | Chiquititas | Alberto Corrêa da Silva (Beto) | SBT |
| 2013 | O Fenômeno Rebelde | Co-presenter | SBT |
| 2023-2025 | SOS Empreendedor | Co-presenter | TV Jovem Pan |

=== Internet ===
| Year | Title | Role | Platform |
|---|---|---|---|
| 2021–2022 | +1 Podcast | Co-presenter | YouTube |
| 2026–present | Bradock Show | Presenter | YouTube |

=== Radio ===
| Year | Title | Role | Network |
|---|---|---|---|
| 2011 | iPan | Himself | Jovem Pan FM |

=== Theatre ===
| Year | Title | Role | Theatre |
|---|---|---|---|
| 2016 | 4Ever - A Última Noite | Diego | Teatro Santo Agostinho |
| 2017 | Os Donos do Mundo | Lucas | Teatro Santo Agostinho |
