= Coração de Estudante =

- Created by: Emanoel Jacobina
- Directed by: Ricardo Waddington
- Starring: Fábio Assunção; Adriana Esteves; Helena Ranaldi; Vladimir Brichta; Cláudio Marzo; Ângela Vieira; Marcello Antony; Carolina Kasting; Marcos Caruso; Jussara Freire; Bruno Garcia; Pedro Malta; Júlia Feldens; Alinne Moraes see more
- Opening theme: Maria Solidária by Beto Guedes
- Country of origin: Brazil
- Original language: Portuguese
- No. of episodes: 185

Production
- Production location: Brazil
- Running time: 45 minutes (approx.)

Original release
- Network: TV Globo
- Release: 25 February – 27 September 2002

Related
- A Padroeira; Sabor da Paixão

Coração de Estudante (English: Student's Heart) is a Brazilian telenovela produced and broadcast by TV Globo in 2002.

== Cast ==
- Fábio Assunção as Edu (Eduardo Feitosa)
- Helena Ranaldi as Clara Gouveia Feitosa
- Adriana Esteves as Amelinha (Amélia Mourão)
- Vladimir Brichta as Nélio Garcia
- Cláudio Marzo as João Alfredo Mourão
- Carolina Kasting as Mariana Mendes
- Marcello Antony as Leandro Junqueira
- Ângela Vieira as Esmeralda Camargo
- Bruno Garcia as Pedro Guerra
- Marcos Caruso as Raul Gouveia
- Pedro Malta as Lipe (Felipe Mendes Feitosa)
- Júlia Feldens as Rafaela Tavares
- Alinne Moraes as Rosana
- Jussara Freire as Lígia Gouveia
- Jéssica Marina as Sofia Mourão
- Caio Blat as Matheus Camargo
- Paulo Vilhena as Fábio
- Cláudio Heinrich as Baú (Gustavo Brandão)
- Paulo Gorgulho as Caio
- Rodrigo Prado as Carlos
- Betito Tavares as Cardosinho
- Michelle Birkheuer as Bruna
- Kailany Guimarães as Vitinho/Vítor (Rosana's baby)
- Marília Passos as Patty (Patrícia Gouveia Brandão)
- Alexandra Richter as Rita
- Leonardo Villar as Ronaldo Rosa
- Ítalo Rossi as Juiz Bonifácio
- Tião D'Ávila as Sílvio
- Ana Carbatti as Eneida
- Dill Costa as Raimunda
- Hugo Gross as Detetive Alceu
- Juliana Martins as Ana
- Mário César Camargo as Beraldo
- Paulo Figueiredo as Prefeito Lineu Inácio
- Ricardo Petraglia as Dr. Armando
- Sônia Guedes as Madalena
- Fernanda de Freitas as Heloísa
- Ana Paula Botelho as Bia
- Cacá Bueno as Horácio
- Jana Palma as Luciana
- Xando Graça as Delegado Isolino Furtado
- Ramon Francisco as Zé
- Nathália França as Carol Rosa

=== Supporting cast ===
- Adalberto Nunes as Miguel
- Alexandre Zacchia as driver
- Aline Borges as Dolores (Amelinha's employee)
- Amandha Lee as Laura
- Ana Roberta Gualda as student
- Bia Nunnes as Dra. Selma (Lipe's psychologist)
- Bruno Abrahão as Lipe's colleague
- Bruno Gradim as Maurício (Lolô's groom)
- Cláudia Lira as Matilde
- Cléa Simões as Naná (Lipe's nanny)
- Dorgíval Jr. as Rodrigo
- Erom Cordeiro as student
- Eunice Silva as Dona Alair (secretary of the university)
- Fausto Maule as Buddy Holliday
- Fernanda de Freitas as Lolô (Heloísa Cordeiro)
- Gilberto Marmorosch as Fernetto's innkeeper
- Heitor Martinez as Cláudio (Clara's friend)
- Jaime Leibovitch as João Mourão's lawyer
- Lucas Margutti as student
- Luciana Rigueira as Vanderléia
- Luiz Felipe Badin as Osvaldo (bearer of the down syndrome)
- Malu Valle as Eliane (Rafaela's mother)
- Marcelo Escorel as Joaquim Mendes
- Marcos França as forum official
- Marcos Palmeira as Júlio Rosa
- Maria Cristina Gatti as Andréia (social assistant)
- Marilu Bueno as Madame Nicete
- Marly Bueno as Zuzú (mother-in-law Pedro)
- Mauro José as Padre Saulo
- Miguel Rômulo as André
- Monique Lafond as Amelinha's medical
- Murilo Elbas as apparitor
- Nica Bonfim as João Mourão's nurse
- Nildo Parente as Dr. Carrasco (Mariana's lawyer)
- Orã Figueiredo as Marido de Mercedes
- Plínio Soares - Antônio (Rafaela's father)
- Roberto Frota as entrepreneur
- Rodrigo Edelstein as student
- Roger Gobeth as Zeca Estrela (Zé Coutinho)
- Rosaly Papadopol as Fábio's mother
- Rosane Gofman
- Tadeu di Pietro as entrepreneur
