= TV Globinho =

Brazilian children's TV program block

- Official logo for its last season.
- Genre: Children's television series
- Created by: J.B. Oliveira; Paulo Souza Amaral
- Directed by: Roberto Naar; Carlos Magalhães; Boninho
- Country of origin: Brazil
- Original language: Portuguese
- No. of seasons: 16

Production
- Running time: 95 minutes

Original release
- Network: Rede Globo
- Release: 3 July 2000 – 1 August 2015
- Release: 10 October 2026 (special edition)

Related
- Globinho (1972–1982)

TV Globinho (formerly Globinho) is a children's television program produced by Rede Globo. It was dedicated to cartoons and anime and was broadcast from 3 July 2000, until 1 August 2015. The strand was responsible for introducing several shows that became the most successful in recent years, being the most watched children's show on Brazilian TV in the 2000s. TV Globinho became popular for broadcasting shows like Dragon Ball Z and SpongeBob SquarePants.

In June 2012, the program went off the air on weekdays being broadcast only on Saturdays, losing its weekday morning timeslot for the talkshow Encontro com Fátima Bernardes which caused a great uproar among the Brazilian public. On 1 August 2015, TV Globinho was discontinued losing its timeslot for the program É De Casa.

== History ==
=== Bambuluá ===
TV Globinho's origin is connected to a transitional phase in Globo's children's programming, between the end of Angélica's Angel Mix and the premiere of Bambuluá, on 9 October 2000. Angel Mix was, until then, responsible for airing the cartoons on TV Globo and left the air on 30 June 2000, being replaced by a provisional slot called Férias Animadas, which premiered the following week on 3 July. In the new program, Angélica appeared travelling and Globo premiered a package of new cartoons, among them the successful Digimon.

Meanwhile, at the end of the year, Férias Animadas' format changed, with the end of the travels, the program started airing the presenter next to young reporters who showed the construction of the set of Bambuluá which was going to be the main set of the new show, as well as facts about the upcoming program. The team was already presenting itself as reporters of TV Globinho, giving the start of the program's history. The commercial schedule given to the press gave the slot the provisional title Programação de Desenhos, while on the actual network it was already TV Globinho.

On 9 October 2000, with the premiere of Bambuluá, Angélica's new children's program, TV Globinho became the station of the fictional city, being a part of the new program. Maintaining the same team of presenters, the TV station was still responsible for the announcements of the cartoons. At the time, the team was made up of Cláudia Souto, Julio Iglesias, Cláudio Lobato, Mariana Mesquita, Chico Soares, Toni Brandão and Mariana Caltabiano. Direction was in charge of Marcelo Zambelli, Pedro Vasconcelos and Márcio Trigo, who was also the general director of the pgogram. TV Globinho's team of presenters was Élida Muniz (Xereta), Guilherme Vieira (Prego), Vívian Weyll (Jujuba), Charles Emmanuel (Escova) and Edmundo Albrecht (Matraca). A TV Globinho also aired several in-house segments, such as Irmãos em Ação, Iscavoka-Iscavoka, Garrafinha, Turma da Mônica na TV, Jornal Globinho and As Aventuras de Zeca e Juca, among others. Angélica also took part in the schedule, in segments such as Caverna Moderna, SuperStar, Agenda da Angélica and Conexão Bambuluá. The program continued in this format until the end of Bambuluá com Angélica, on 31 December 2001.

=== Early years as an independent program ===
On 1 January 2002, TV Globinho became an independent program. The same presenting and directing teams were kept. Airing from Monday to Friday at 9:25am, TV Globinho altered between premieres and reruns. On 28 October of the same year, however, TV Globinho was reformulated with the exit of its presenters. The team was led by Thiago Arruda and direction by Flávio Rocha. The focus of the program continued to be the airing of cartoons, from 10:30am on weekdays. The new format had five fixed presenters, one for each day of the week: Graziella Schmitt (Mondays), Geovanna Tominaga (Tuesdays), Élida Muniz (remnant of the previous format, Wednesdays), Sthefany Brito (Thursdays) and Fernanda de Freitas (Fridays) – they took turns during the weekdays, but each one had a fixed day to present, the idea was to have a presenter of each different body type, one blonde, one brunette, one black, one Japanese and so on, since the others children's programs only had blonde presenters. At this stage, some of the cartoons that were shown were Rugrats, SpongeBob SquarePants, Little Lulu, Spider-Man, Totally Spies! and Dragon Ball. In November 2002 it premiered Jackie Chan Adventures.

On 18 January 2003, TV Globinho started airing on Saturdays from 7am, replacing Festival de Desenhos, which had been presented by actress Deborah Secco since 2001. Graziella Schmitt was made responsible for hosting on Saturdays. Ana Carolina Dias entered to the program, having been before as a cast member on Bambuluá.

In May 2003, Fernanda de Freitas leaves the show in order to act on Kubanacan, being then replaced by actress Maytê Piragibe. In 2003, the presenting team consisted of Letícia Colin, on Mondays to replace Sthefany Britto, who had also left the program to join the cast of the new 7pm telenovela "Agora é Que São Elas". Since then the program had as hosts Letícia Colin (Mondays), Élida Muniz (Tuesdays), Geovanna Tominaga (Wednesdays), Maytê Piragibe (Thursdays), Carol Dias (Fridays) e Graziella Schmitt (Saturdays).

In October, TV Globinho introduced new cartoons and series, such as Braceface whose dub featured actress Mariana Ximenes, as well as UBOS, Shaman King, Lá Vem o Andy, Heróis em Resgate, Jimmy Neutron, The Mummy, The Fairly OddParents, Beyblade and Galidor. Other cartoons that aired at the time included: Yu-Gi-Oh!, Stickin' Around, Hamtaro, SpongeBob SquarePants and Jackie Chan Adventures.

On 7 February 2004, Graziela Schmitt left the program to act on Malhação, and in its place, Sthefany Britto returned. At the same time the program premiered a new set with its logo on the floor and a multi-colored wall with the cartoon characters stamped, the presenters who were once seen from the waist up were now seen in full body, at the time the presenters' shifs changed with Maytê Piragibe on Mondays, Élida Muniz on Tuesdays, Carol Dias on Wednesdays, Geovanna Tominaga on Thursdays, Letícia Colin on Fridays and Stéfany Britto on Saturdays. On 13 September 2004, Maytê Piragibe left TV Globinho to join the cast of "Como Uma Onda". The following Monday, 20 September, Thiara Palmieri became the host on Mondays. Later, Sthefany left to act in "Começar de Novo", and in its place, former Xuxa Paquita Thalita Ribeiro appeared. As consequence, the team of presenters was Thiara Palmieri (Mondays), Thalita Ribeiro (Tuesdays), Carol Dias (Wednesdays), Cecília Dassi (Thursdays), who came to replace Élida Muniz, Letícia Colin (Fridays) and Geovanna Tominaga (Saturdays).

=== The Geovanna Tominaga years ===
On 3 January 2005, Astro Boy, InuYasha and Pokémon premiere, as well as the return of Rocket Power, X-Men and Dragon Ball GT, on 12 February the same year Digimon 1 returned, as well as Chip 'n Dale Rescue Rangers, Rugrats, and Hamtaro. From 2 April, all presenters leave and the program is hosted entirely by Geovanna Tominaga, in preparation for the following Monday, the premiere of TV Xuxa, at the time presented by Xuxa Meneghel, causing TV Globinho to be limited to Saturdays, but suffered frequent pre-emptions due to Globo's sports schedule. During this period, Catscratch, The Fairly OddParents, Danny Phantom and Ultimate Book of Spells premiered. In September 2006, more Disney series arrived to the program, such as Buzz Lightyear, Hercules, Lilo e Stitch and Timon and Pumba.

On 1 January 2008, the program returns to weekdays, after the end of TV Xuxa in its existing format. Still under the helm of Geovanna, TV Globinho increases its airtime from 9:30am to 12pm and on Saturdays from 8:30am to 10:30pm. Among the premieres in the year were, Fantastic Four: World's Greatest Heroes, as well as Disney series American Dragon: Jake Long and Brandy & Mr. Whiskers; on 31 March 2008, TV Globo started airing Avatar: The Last Airbender as well as new episodes of SpongeBob SquarePants. That same day, TV Globinho gained a new set, but the intro remained the same.

In April new episodes of SpongeBob and Totally Spies! arrived, as well as the premieres of Yin Yang Yo!, Power Rangers: S.P.D.; The Simpsons starts airing on the daily schedule, until then it aired on Saturdays. For the Winter holiday season in July the line-up consisted of Little Lulu, W.I.T.C.H. and reruns of Dragon Ball Z, also that year it aired The X's, CatDog e The Replacements close to the end of the year, but aired for a short period of time.

On Saturdays in 2008 the offer consisted of Hannah Montana and cartoons that normally didn't air on weekdays such as 101 Dalmatians, The Legend of Tarzan, Kim Possible and The Little Mermaid, as well as feature films such as Xuxinha e Guto contra os Monstros do Espaço (national production), Wallace & Gromit: The Curse of the Were-Rabbit, Stuart Little 3: Call of the Wild and Robin Hood at the beginning of 2009 still presented by Geovanna Tominaga.

On 24 December 2008 (Christmas Eve), Geovanna presented TV Globinho Especial de Natal, at 11pm. A few specials were broadcast, Mickey's Twice Upon a Christmas, the Simpsons season 9 Christmas episode Miracle on Evergreen Terrace and The Madagascar Penguins in a Christmas Caper.

=== Dual presenter phase ===
In early 2009 TV Globinho premiered George of the Jungle (2007 TV series) e The Spectacular Spider-Man, as well as the return of Yu-Gi-Oh! GX.

On 6 February 2009, Geovanna celebrated 1,440 editions fronting TV Globinho; Tominaga left on 28 February, becoming the longest presenter in its history. On 2 March, TV Globinho was presented by Mariah Rocha however during her tenure Mariah discovered that she was pregnant of her first son. New names appeared such as Marco Antônio Gimenez, Gustavo Leão, Ícaro Silva, Ivo Filho, Milena Toscano, Marina Ruy Barbosa, and Rafael Almeida, until 11 April.

On 13 April 2009, Program opening changes after seven years without change. The TV Globinho scenario has also changed. As children are able to imagine themselves in fantastic places, the presenters also go through this experience, in a scenario that takes them into the magical universe of cartoons. The stage environment was combined with the textures of the animations, supporting the presenters' actions with the cartoons. The program also got a new logo, made in CGI, the presenters at this stage were: Fabrício Santiago, Marco Antônio Gimenez, Flávia Rubim, Bernardo Mendes, Bruno Pereira in addition to Élida Muniz who returned to the program this year. On 29 June, the winter holiday schedule arrived to TV Globinho, with Kamen Rider as the main attraction. On 14 September, the program gained a new team of presenters. In addition to the cartoons and live-action series, Eline Porto, Élida Muniz, Tatyane Goulart, Fernanda Pontes, Flávia Rubim, Guilherme Bernard, Gustavo Pereira and Pedro Buarque later after the departure of some presenters, in September Daniel Uemura, Lyinn Court and Lua Blanco became part of the group. In November the team of presenters changes once again and now includes: Giovanna Ewbank, Lorena Comparato, Rafael Ciane, Eduardo Kaká who joined those who were already part of the program previously such as Flávia Rubim, Fernanda Pontes and Paulo Mathias Jr. Between January and March 2010 the new presenter team emerged with the following: Mussunzinho, Giovanna Ewbank, Miguel Rômulo e Jéssika Alves que se juntaram á Flávia Rubim, Paulo Mathias Jr. and Fernanda Pontes.

=== Fixed presenters ===
In 2010, Paulo Mathias Jr., Paulinho and Flávia Rubim, Flavinha, were fixed once and for all as presenters of the program, which gained a new set representing a room full of toys, and which every program the characters, Paulinho and Flavinha, acted out a story. On 24 January 2011, Flávia Rubim left the program to join the cast of Cordel Encantado, being succeeded by Mariah Rocha from 26 January 2011, who began presenting the program alongside Paulo Mathias Jr. The program was directed by Roberto Naar (general) and Boninho.

In this period the block aired live-action series such as iCarly, Jonas and Wizards of Waverly Place, as well as cartoons such as Gormiti, The Penguins of Madagascar, SpongeBob SquarePants, Phineas and Ferb, The Simpsons, Spectacular Spider-Man, Dragon Ball Z and Totally Spies.

=== Displacement from the weekday schedule, end of presented phase and ending ===
On 22 June 2012, the program leaves the weekday schedule in order to give more airtime to Encontro com Fátima Bernardes, with this displacement, it only aired on Saturday mornings. From April 2013, it received a new package of shows, such as Super Hero Squad, Ultimate Spider-Man and Avengers Assemble.

In early 2014, it premiered Como Treinar o Seu Dragão: A Série and Canadian series My Babysitter's a Vampire. From 16 May to 1 August 2015, TV Globinho ceased airing cartoons and live-action series and limited to kid-friendly movies from franchises such as Diary of a Wimpy Kid and Men in Black, among others, causing the end of the last children's program on the network; children's movies continued on other movie slots on the network, on afternoons and special occasions. The ending was also due to the strong migration of the target audience to subscription television and the internet, resulting in the creation of Gloob and the subsequent preschool channel, Gloobinho. The movies Shrek and Alvin and the Chipmunks 3: Chipwrecked were the last titles seen on TV Globinho, receiving an average audience of 11 points, the highest in 2015 alone. The following Saturday saw the premiere of its replacement, É de Casa.

=== International version ===
An international version aired on TV Globo Internacional from 2016 to 2018, only airing Brazilian titles such as Turma da Mônica, Vida de Galinha and SOS Fada Manu as well as Gloob titles, such as Buuu, Detetives do Prédio Azul, Gaby Estrella, Tem Criança na Cozinha, Sítio do Pica Pau Amarelo and the TV Cultura series Cocoricó, it aired on Saturday and Sunday mornings.

=== 2026 one-off revival ===
On 12 August 2026, TV Globo announced a teaser for a one-off special, eleven years after its end, to be shown on 10 October, part of Maratona da Esperança, one of the specials for the 2026 edition of Criança Esperança.

One week ahead of the event, it first announced Totally Spies!, followed by Dragon Ball Z and Digimon.

Despite the massive request from netizens, the return was somewhat underperforming, scoring 5.6 IBOPE points and 20.7% in overall share. It did, however, lead over-the-air ratings on the day it aired, but slightly above Fala Brasil on Record.

== Presenters ==
=== 2000–2002 ===
| Period | Presenter |
|---|---|
| 2000 - 2001 | Angélica |
| 2000 - 2002 | Guilherme Vieira |
| 2000 - 2002 | Vívian Weyll |
| 2000 - 2002 | Charles Emmanuel |
| 2000 - 2002 | Edmundo Albrecht |
| 2000 - 2004; 2009 - 2010 | Élida Muniz |

=== 2002–2009 ===
| Period | Presenter |
|---|---|
| 29 October 2002 - 28 February 2009 | Geovanna Tominaga |
| 28 October 2002 - February 2004 | Graziella Schmitt |
| 31 October 2002 - Abril 2003 // Fevereiro - July 2004 | Sthefany Brito |
| 1 November 2002 - Abril 2003 | Fernanda de Freitas |
| Abril 2003 - 30 March 2005 | Ana Carolina Dias |
| 24 March 2003 - 1 April 2005 | Letícia Colin |
| 3 April 2003 - 13 September 2004 | Maytê Piragibe |
| July 2004 - 31 March 2005 | Cecília Dassi |
| 20 September 2004 - 28 March 2005 | Thiara Palmieri |
| October 2004 - 29 March 2005 | Thalita Ribeiro |

=== 2009 ===
| Period | Presenter |
|---|---|
| 2009 | Gustavo Leão |
| 2009 | Marco Antônio Gimenez |
| 2009 | Rafael Almeida |
| 2009 | Ícaro Silva |
| 2009 | Milena Toscano |
| 2009 | Marina Ruy Barbosa |
| 2009 | Ivo Filho |
| 2 March 2009 - June 2011 | Mariah Rocha |

=== 2009 (new presenters) ===
| Period | Presenter |
|---|---|
| 2009-2010 | Yana Sardenberg |
| 2010 | Jéssika Alves |
| 2009 | Lua Blanco |
| 2009-2010 | Giovanna Ewbank |
| 2009-2010 | Fernanda Pontes |
| 2010 | Mussunzinho |
| 2010 | Miguel Rômulo |
| 2009 | Bernardo Mendes |
| 2009 | Eline Porto |
| 2009 | Tatyane Goulart |
| 2009 | Lynn Court |
| 2009 | Bruno Pereira |
| 2009 | Rafael Ciane |
| 2009 | Pedro Buarque |
| 2009 | Eduardo Kaká |
| 2009 | Fabrício Santiago |
| 2009 | Daniel Uemura |
| 2009 | Lorena Comparato |
| 2009 | Gustavo Pereira |

=== 2010–2011 ===
| Period | Presenter |
|---|---|
| 13 April 2009 - 24 January 2011 | Flávia Rubim |
| 2009 - 2011 | Paulo Mathias Jr. |

=== 2011–2012 ===
| Period | Presenter |
|---|---|
| 16 July 2011 - 22 June 2012 | Letícia Navas |
| 16 July 2011 - 22 June 2012 | Eric Surita |

== Ratings ==
Between 2000 and 2001, when it was presented by Angélica, the program recorded an average of 9 points and was behind SBT's Bom Dia & Cia, presented at the time by Jackeline Petkovic. However it still maintained second place alongside Record's Eliana e Alegria. With the arrival of new presenters, it reached its apex in ratings, oscillating between 15 and 17 points on average; in 2003, it registered 10 points and led its timeslot. In 2004, TV Globinho was the most-watched children's program on Brazilian TV, with an averag of 16 IBOPE points. Upon moving to Saturdays in 2005 (because of TV Xuxa on weekdays), the program, under Geovanna Tominaga, continued to score 10 share points with a share of 41% and 6.2 million viewers tuning in, over two million more than its competitor in the timeslot; in regional markets, it also had a good ratings development scoring more than the two competitors combined, later still under Tominaga, when it became daily again, it scored an average 7 to 10 points and still leading the timeslot. After Tominaga left, in 2009 and 2010, it registered an average of 8 to 9 points, showing a decline, but still maintaining its leadership against Bom Dia & Cia scoring 6 points and Record and Band scoring 4. In 2011, under Letícia Navas and Emílio Eric Surita, its average rose to 21 points, and in 2012, it fell in ratings to an average of 5 to 7 IBOPE points after Letícia Navas and Emílio Eric left, even though the cartoons and live-action series were still the same, it even lost to Record's Hoje em Dia, with an index of only 5 points. When it was limited to Saturdays only, it even reached an apex of 12 IBOPE points.
