= Marjorie Estiano e Banda Ao Vivo =

Video by Marjorie Estiano
- Released: November 1, 2005 (Brazil)
- Recorded: September 4 and 5, 2005; In the Espaço LocAll (SP)
- Genre: Concert/Tour
- Length: 75:00
- Label: Universal Music
- Directors: Joana Mazzucchelli (Video); A. Castilho and Victor Pozas (Audio)
- Producer: Universal Music/Audiosfera

Marjorie Estiano e Banda ao Vivo it is a DVD of Marjorie Estiano's first tour, recorded in São Paulo, in the Espaço LocAll.

== Track listing ==
1. Intro
2. Miss Celies Blues (Sister) *
3. So Easy
4. O Jogo
5. O Que Tiver Que Ser
6. Até o Fim *
7. Tudo Passa
8. Cherish *
9. Sem Direção
10. Parte de Você
11. You're So Beautiful *
12. Versus Mudos
13. As Horas
14. Reflexo do Amor
15. This Love *
16. Por Mais Que Eu Tente
17. Você Sempre Será

* Denotes new songs that were not included in her debut album.

Bonus

1. So Easy (Acoustic)
2. Você Sempre Será (Acoustic)
3. Você Sempre Será (Video)
4. Photo gallery
5. "Making of"

== Sales ==
| Chart | Certification | Sales |
|---|---|---|
| Brasil | Gold | 25,000 |
