= Capitu =

- Genre: Mini-Series
- Based on: Dom Casmurro, by Machado de Assis
- Developed by: Luiz Fernando Carvalho
- Written by: Euclydes Marinho; Luiz Fernando Carvalho; Daniel Piza; Luis Alberto de Abreu; Edna Palatnik
- Directed by: Luiz Fernando Carvalho
- Starring: Maria Fernanda Cândido; Michel Melamed; Eliane Giardini; Letícia Persiles
- Opening theme: "Elephant Gun" by Beirut
- Country of origin: Brazil
- Original language: Portuguese
- No. of episodes: 5

Production
- Editors: Helena Chaves; Carlos Eduardo Kerr; Márcio Hashimoto Soares
- Production company: Estúdios Globo

Original release
- Network: Rede Globo
- Release: 9 December – 13 December 2008

Related
- Queridos Amigos; Maysa: Quando Fala o Coração

Capitu is a Brazilian television series written by Euclydes Marinho, directed by Luiz Fernando Carvalho, who also finalized the script, and presented by Rede Globo between 8 and 13 December 2008. The production was a homage to the centennial anniversary of the death of Machado de Assis, author of the 1899 novel Dom Casmurro, on which the miniseries was based. Capitu is the main female character of that novel, and is the object of Bentinho's (Dom Casmurro) obsession. The novel forces the reader to decide if Capitu cheated or not on Bentinho.

== Production ==
The mini-series was written by Euclydes Marinho in collaboration with Daniel Piza, Luis Alberto de Abreu and Edna Palatnik, and has the script finalized by Luiz Fernando Carvalho. Art direction by Raimundo Rodriguez, photography by Adrian Teijido and costumes by Beth Filipecki. Colorist Sergio Pasqualino. It marked the TV debut of actors Letícia Persiles and Michel Melamed, among others. The mini-series was filmed in the abandoned Automóvel Clube building, in downtown Rio de Janeiro, and the whole scenographic universe was created from newspaper and recycled material. The opening credits scene was conceived by the director and created by the designer Carlos Bêla. The production is part of the Quadrante Project and was the director's tribute to Machado de Assis on the centenary of his death.

== Cast ==
Actor/Actress	Character
Maria Fernanda Cândido	Capitu (Capitolina Pádua)
Michel Melamed	Bentinho (Bento de Albuquerque Santiago)
Eliane Giardini	Dona Glória
Letícia Persiles	Capitu (young)
César Cardadeiro	Bentinho (young)
Pierre Baitelli	Ezequiel de Sousa Escobar (1st episode)
Rita Elmôr	Cousin Justina
Sandro Christopher	Uncle Cosme/Marcolini/Imperator
Charles Fricks	Sr. Pádua
Bellatrix Serra	Sancha Gurgel
Izabella Bicalho	Dona Fortunata Pádua
Antônio Karnewale	José Dias
Thelmo Fernandes	Sr. Gurgel
Emílio Pitta	Priest Cabral
Vitor Facchinetti	Dandi do Cavalo-Alazão
Alan Scarpari	Ezequiel Santiago
Jacy Marques	Slave
Gabriela Luiz	Slave

The Children

Actor/Actress	Character
Beatriz Souza	Capitolina
Fabrício Reis	Ezequiel Santiago (child)

Special guests

Ator	Personagem
Paulo José	Parish's Vicar
Eduardo Pires	Young poet
Alby Ramos	Manduca's father

== Reception ==
=== Critical response ===
In the opinion of critic Gustavo Bernardo, the mini-series deserves "to be viewed and reviewed countless times, at least because each fragment of a scene is precious for its beauty". According to theatre director Gabriel Villela, Luiz Fernando Carvalho produces works of art on the screen, calls on the viewer's vivacity so that he accepts nothing masticated, but masticates along with Casmurro. For Randall Johnson, director of the UCLA Latin American Institute, "Luiz Fernando Carvalho is today, without doubt, the director whose work is the most authorial of all TV and cinema production in Brazil".

=== Accolades ===
It received the APCA (Associação Paulista de Críticos de Arte) Critic's Choice Award (2009), ABC Best Photography Award (from the Associação Brasileira de Cinematografia) and the Creative Review award in the Best in Book and Design and Art Director categories.

== Bibliography ==
- Carvalho, Luiz Fernando (2008). O processo de Capitu. LeYa Casa da Palavra. ISBN 978-8577341023.
- Carvalho, Luiz Fernando (2008). "Capitu c'est moi?". Livro - Quem é Capitu?. Nova Fronteira. pp. 17–20. ISBN 9788520920831.
- Carvalho, Luiz Fernando; Diniz, Julio (2008). "Capitu c'est moi?". Machado de Assis (1908-2008). Contraponto. pp. 80–83. ISBN 978-85-7866-011-6.
- Carter, Eli Lee "Rereading Dom Casmurro - aesthetic hybridity in Capitu", University of Virginia, 2014.
- Guzzi, C. P. (2012). "Por uma ficção autoconsciente: a transposição do romance Dom Casmurro para a minissérie Capitu" (PDF). Machado de Assis Em Linha: 82–101.
- Guzzi, C. P. (2012). "A narrativa impressionista do escritor Machado de Assis e a atitude expressionista do diretor Luiz Fernando Carvalho". CASA (Araraquara). 10 (2): 1–12. doi:10.21709/casa.v10i2.5593.
- Bulhões, Marcelo Magalhães (2012). "Para Além da "Fidelidade" na Adaptação Audiovisual: o Caso da Minissérie Televisiva Capitu". Galáxia. Revista do Programa de Pós-Graduação em Comunicação e Semiótica (23).
- Nepomuceno, Mariana Maciel (2015). "O elogio da ilusão: Capitu de Luiz Fernando Carvalho". Pernambuco: UFPE.
- Torrens Leite, Rafaela Bernardazzi (2016). "Poética visual e a relação com elementos fílmicos da minissérie Capitu". Revista Estética. Archived from the original on 29 September 2017.
- Czizewski, Claiton César; Silva, Anderson Lopes (2014). "Capitu: A cultura híbrida e a liquidez pós-moderna em um olhar". Revista Latino Americana de Estudios en Cultura. Archived from the original on 29 September 2017.
- Pucci, Renato Luiz (2015). "Grande Sertão: Veredas e Capitu – Rupturas de paradigmas na ficção televisiva brasileira" (PDF). Socine.
- Izawa, Irene (2012). "Capitu: uma leitura pós-moderna de Dom Casmurro – Rupturas de paradigmas na ficção televisiva brasileira" (PDF). Curitiba: Uniandrade. Archived from the original (PDF) on 29 September 2017.
- Becker, Caroline Valada (2010). "Dom Casmurro e Capitu : poéticas da palavra e da imagem". Porto Alegre: UFRGS.
- Santos, Juliana Rodrigues dos (2010). "A literatura na tela da televisão: Capitu, uma tradução de Dom Casmurro". Campo Grande: UFMS.
- Torrens Leite, Rafaela Bernardazzi (2015). A cor e o figurino na construção de personagens na narrativa televisual: um estudo de caso da minissérie Capitu (Thesis). São Paulo: USP. doi:10.11606/D.27.2015.tde-24112015-164357.
- Monteiro, Alexandre de Assis (2013). "Capitu: olhares para uma narração oblíqua". João Pessoa: UFPB.
- Pires, Yasmin (2013). "Um Expressionismo em Capitu: a apropriação imagética contemporânea". Manaus: Universidade da Amazônia.
- Monteiro, Alexandre de Assis; Mousinho, Luiz Antonio (2016). "A captura de Dom Casmurro por uma crítica disposta entre o romance e a microssérie". Bakhtiniana: Revista de Estudos do Discurso. 11 (3): 103–119. doi:10.1590/2176-457322360.
- Millecco, Mariana (2017). "No princípio era o texto: Dom Casmurro no papel, Capitu na tela". Machado de Assis Em Linha. 10 (20): 110–133. doi:10.1590/1983-6821201710207.
- Collaço, Fernando Martins (2013). "Luiz Fernando Carvalho e o processo criativo na televisão : a minissérie Capitu e o estilo do diretor". Universidade Estadual de Campinas.
- Pinati, Flávia Giúlia Andriolo (2013). "Capitu: uma transposição metaficcional". São Paulo: Unesp. hdl:11449/94088.
- Silva, Ana Claudia Suriani; Millecco, Mariana (2017). "Entrevista com Beth Filipecki, figurinista de Capitu (2008)". Machado de Assis Em Linha. 10 (20): 147–153. doi:10.1590/1983-6821201710209.
- Oliveira, Lara Luiza Spagnol (2013). "Aí vindes outra vez, inquietas sombras: tempo e memória na tradução de Dom Casmurro para Capitu" (PDF). Belo Horizonte: UFMG. Archived from the original (PDF) on 29 September 2017.
- Bezerra, Júlia Rochetti (2016). "Da adaptação de Dom Casmurro : do romance aos quadrinhos e à televisão". Campinas: Unicamp.
- Rosa, Luiza Maria Almeida (2012). "A adaptação barroca de Dom Casmurro para Capitu: do livro ao corpo na TV". São Paulo: PUC-SP. Archived from the original on 15 February 2019.
- Nonato, Lívia Martins (2013). "Teatralidade na obra audiovisual Capitu". Londrina: Universidade de Londrina.
- Heck, Ana Paula (2014). "Uma ideia e um escrúpulo:a a apropriação de Capitu como experiência educomunicativa" (PDF). Curitiba: UFPR. Archived from the original (PDF) on 29 September 2017.
