= Fernanda Vasconcellos =

Brazilian actress (born 1984)

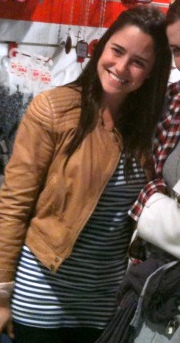
- Vasconcellos in 2010
- Born: Fernanda de Vasconcellos Galvez; 14 September 1984 (age 41); São Paulo, Brazil
- Occupations: Actress, voice actress
- Years active: 1998–present
- Notable work: Malhação, Páginas da Vida
- Children: 1
- Parent(s): Adenilde Vasconcellos (mother); Sérgio Galvez (father)

Fernanda de Vasconcellos Galvez (born 14 September 1984) is a Brazilian actress and voice actress.

== Career ==
Vasconcellos worked as a model starring in several TV commercials and as a dancer in SBT's Fantasia show before becoming an actress. Fernanda played the lead role of Betina in the 2005 season of Malhação working with actor Thiago Rodrigues. After leaving Malhação, she played an art student character named Nanda in the 2006 Globo telenovela Páginas da Vida. This was her second time as Thiago Rodrigues' love interest. Vasconcellos won the Best Newcomer Actress Award for this performance. Next, she played the lead role of Clara in the 2007 telenovela Desejo Proibido. Set in a fictional 1930s city located in Minas Gerais state, her romantic interest was a character played by Murilo Rosa.

In the 2010 telenovela Tempos Modernos, Vasconcellos again played a character romantically involved opposite actor Thiago Rodrigues, in what would be the third time in her career. She played the lead as Nelinha. Vasconcellos plays the lead role in the 2011 Globo telenovela A Vida da Gente as a tennis player named Ana Fonseca. She plays one of the lead roles in the 2013 Globo telenovela Sangue Bom as Malu, a college student rejected by her famous mother.

== Filmography ==
=== Television ===
| Year | Title | Character |
|---|---|---|
| 2005 | Malhação | Betina Sorrento |
| 2006 | Páginas da Vida | Fernanda Toledo Flores (Nanda) |
| 2007 | Desejo Proibido | Laura de Castro Fernandes |
| 2008 | Casos e Acasos | Bianca |
| 2009 | A Turma do Didi | Herself |
| 2010 | Tempos Modernos | Cornélia Cordeiro (Nelinha) |
| 2011 | A Vida da Gente | Ana Fonseca |
| 2013 | Sangue Bom | Maria Luísa Campana (Malu) |
| 2016 | Haja Coração | Bruna Ferraz Vidal |
| 2018 | 3% | Laís |
| 2019 | Girls from Ipanema | Lígia |
| 2025 | Três Graças | Samira Veiga |

=== Cinema ===
| Year | Movie | Character | Notes |
|---|---|---|---|
| 2006 | Eragon | Saphira | Brazilian voice dubbing |
| 2015 | Por Trás do Céu | Prostitute | preproduction |
| 2019 | Klaus | Alva | Brazilian voice dubbing |

== Stage ==
| Year | Play | Character |
|---|---|---|
| 2009 | Vidas Divididas | Marisete |

=== Awards ===
| Year | Award | Category | Work | Result |
|---|---|---|---|---|
| 2006 | Melhores do Ano | Best Newcomer actress | Páginas da Vida | Won |
