= Pedro Vasconcellos =

Brazilian television actor

Pedro Vasconcelos
- Born: Pedro Vasconcelos de Brito Pereira; October 25, 1974 (age 50); Rio de Janeiro, Brazil
- Occupation(s): person, actor, director

Pedro Vasconcelos (born October 25, 1974) is a Brazilian director and television actor.

== Selected filmography ==
- Império (2014)
- A Teia (2014)
- O Concurso (2013)
- Amor Eterno Amor (2012)
- Escrito nas Estrelas (2010)
- A Marca do Zorro (2009)
- Paraíso (2009)
- Por Toda Minha Vida (2008)
- Sete Pecados (2007)
- Amazônia, de Galvez a Chico Mendes (2007)
- Alma Gêmea (2005)
- Linha Direta (“O caso das máscaras de chumbo”, 2004)
- Bambuluá (2000)
- Sítio do Picapau Amarelo (2001-2002)
- D'Artagnan e Os Três Mosqueteiros (1998)
- Malhação (1995)
- Fera Ferida (1993)
- Vamp (1991)
