= Jéssika Alves =

Brazilian actress (born 1991)

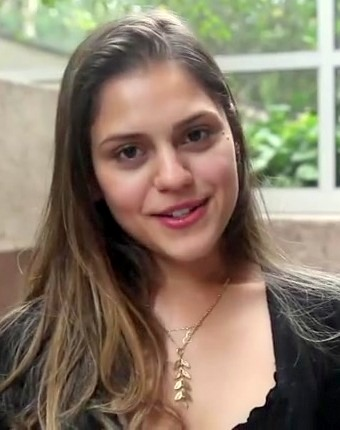
- Alves in 2012
- Born: Jéssika Alves; 26 March 1991 (age 35); Curitiba, Paraná, Brazil
- Occupations: Actress, TV host
- Years active: 2009–present
- Height: 1.65 m (5 ft 5 in)

Jéssika Alves (born 26 March 1991) is a Brazilian actress who has participated in several telenovelas.

== Biography ==
Jéssika Alves was born in Curitiba, Paraná state. When she was 15 years old, she moved to Rio de Janeiro to study acting and theater.

== Career ==
She played Norma Jean, a very popular Malhação character, in the 2009 season of the telenovela, when she was 17 years old. After she left Malhação, Jéssika Alves worked as one of the hosts of TV Globinho. The actress played the prostitute Vânia in the 2011 Rede Globo telenovela Insensato Coração. Jéssika Alves plays Laís in the 2012 telenovela Amor Eterno Amor.

== Filmography ==
=== Television ===
Television
Year	Title	Role
2009	Malhação	Norma Jean Valadares Bacelar
2010	TV Globinho	Host
2010	Diversão & Cia	Míriam
2010	Ti Ti Ti	Young Cecilia Spina
2011	O Cupido	Rafaela
2011	Insensato Coração	Vânia
2012	Preamar	Manu
2012	Amor Eterno Amor	Laís
2014	Em Família	Guiomar
2017	Tempo de Amar	Helena Pacheco

=== Theater ===
Theater
Year	Title	Role
2010	Ceu e Branca	Branca
2011	O Diário de Débora	Débora
