= Carolina Kasting =

Brazilian actress (born 1975)

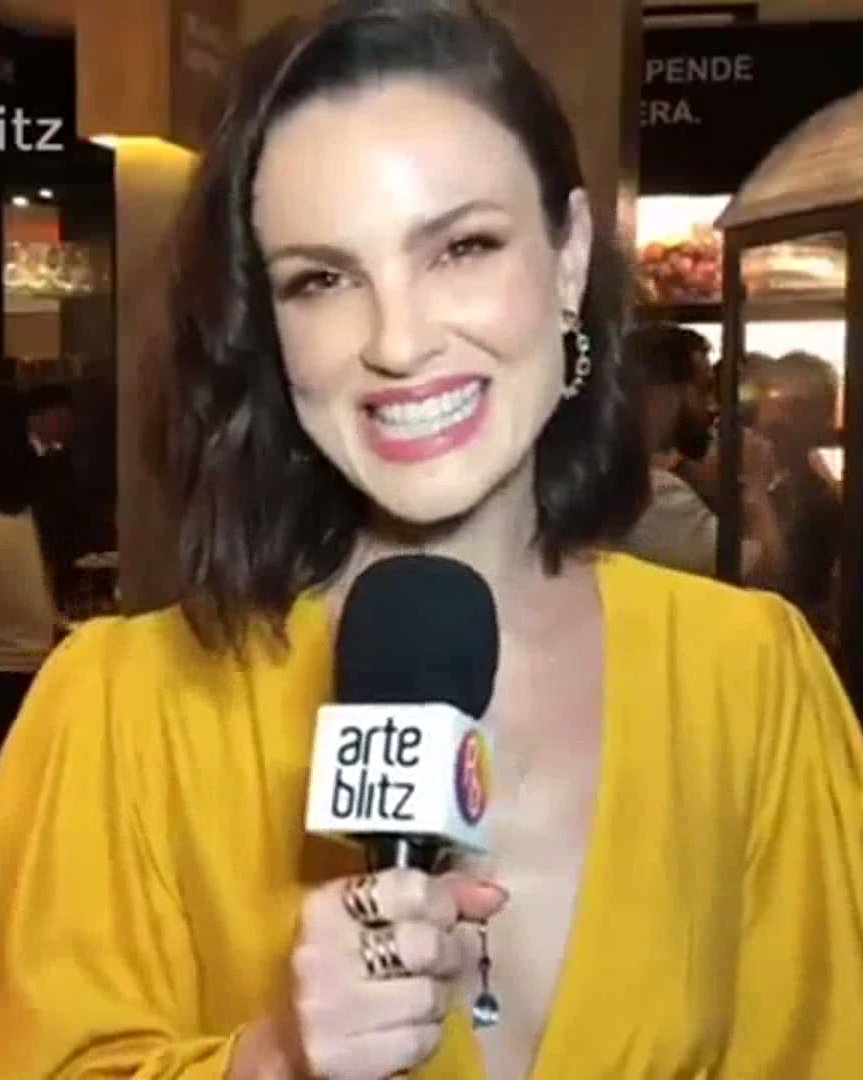
- Kasting in 2017
- Born: Carolina Kasting Arruda; 12 July 1975 (age 50); Florianópolis, Santa Catarina, Brazil
- Occupation: Actress
- Years active: 1996–present
- Spouse: Maurício Grecco (m. 2002)
- Children: 2
- Relatives: Rejane Arruda (older sister)

Carolina Kasting Arruda (born 12 July 1975) is a Brazilian actress.

== Biography ==
At 14, she left school to study in Florianópolis the corps de ballet of the Teatro Guaira in Curitiba. Years later, interest in the theater made it to São Paulo to study drama and work on stage.

== Career ==
In 1996 she left the Rio de Janeiro to attend the workshop for actors of Rede Globo. Soon after, the debut novel Anjo de Mim, as the protagonist, and later, the show Malhação, which was a fake nun. After the premiere on TV, now split between the stage, where she makes sure to always act, and the successive roles on the small screen.

In 1997 starred in the remake of Anjo Mau, and also participated in the miniseries Hilda Furacão. The following year she moved to the Rede Manchete, Brida, and embodied in the soap opera of the same name, her only work outside the Globo.

In 1999 she returned to playing the evil Rosana, in Terra Nostra, she gained national recognition and praise from critics. Accumulated in issuing other memorable works, including the alcoholic Mariana Coração de Estudante, poor medical Laura in Mulheres Apaixonadas, sweet Mariquinha in Cabocla and the spirit of Laura in the remake of O Profeta.

In 2010 she played the villain of the novel Escrito nas Estrelas. In 2011, she was in the soap opera, O Astro, as the sweet Jamile. In 2012, she was in Amor Eterno Amor, as the psychologist Beatriz. In 2013 she played the kind Gina, a girl from the outskirts of São Paulo in Amor à Vida, of Walcyr Carrasco.

In 2015, Carolina played Gilda Noronha, the mother of singer Mari, in Malhação Sonhos, and then introduced Rosa Ventana, a family cook, in Além do Tempo. In 2018, she moved to Portugal to debut in the TVI fiction, integrating the cast of the novel Valor da Vida, with the character Camilla Vasconcelos, a successful businesswoman in the fashion business, but with a black past that made her rise in life (in which she want to hide it from everything and everyone).

In 2020, she returns to Rede Globo as the character Agnes in Salve-se Quem Puder, opposite Vitória Strada who plays her daughter Kyra.

== Personal life ==
Sister of actress Rejane Arruda, Carolina is married to actor and designer Maurício Grecco, with whom she has two children, Cora and Tom.

== Filmography ==
=== Television ===
Year	Title	Role	Notes
1996	Anjo de Mim	Valentina	
1997	Você Decide	Rosana	Episode: "Na Sombra do Passado"
1997	Anjo Mau	Úrsula Vidigal	Special participation
1998	Hilda Furacão	Bela B	
1998	Brida	Brida	
1999	Malhação	Laila	Season 5
1999	Terra Nostra	Rosana Telles de Aranha	
2000	Você Decide	Violante	Episode: "Um Casamento Aberto"
2001	Porto dos Milagres	Laura Proença	First phase
2001	Presença de Anita	Julieta	
2002	Coração de Estudante	Mariana Mendes	
2003	Mulheres Apaixonadas	Laura Medeiros	
2003	Kubanacan	Zelda	Episodes: "November 11 – December 13, 2003"
2004	Cabocla	Mariquinha (Maria Junqueira Caldas)	
2006	Papai Noel Existe	Luciana	Television special
2006	O Profeta	Laura Moura	
2007	Duas Caras	Luíza Fonseca	Special participation
2007	Malhação	Béatrice Loprét Lopes	Season 15
2010	A Princesa e o Vagabundo	Cecília	Special of Rede Globo
2010	Escrito nas Estrelas	Judite	
2011	O Astro	Jamile Hayalla	
2012	Amor Eterno Amor	Beatriz Mainardi	
2013	Amor à Vida	Gina (Regina Maria dos Santos Batista)	
2015	Malhação Sonhos	Gilda Noronha	Season 22; Episodes: "February 19 – March 19, 2015"
2015	Além do Tempo	Rosa Ventana / Rosa Del Corso	
2018	Valor da Vida	Camilla Vasconcelos	In Portugal on the TVI channel
2020	Salve-se Quem Puder	Agnes Romantini	

=== Cinema ===
Year	Title	Role	Note
2001	Sonhos Tropicais	Esther	
2017	Escolhas	Daniela	Short film

== Theater ==
- 1999 – Alice Através do Espelho.... Alice
