= Tânia Mara =

Brazilian singer and actress (born 1983)

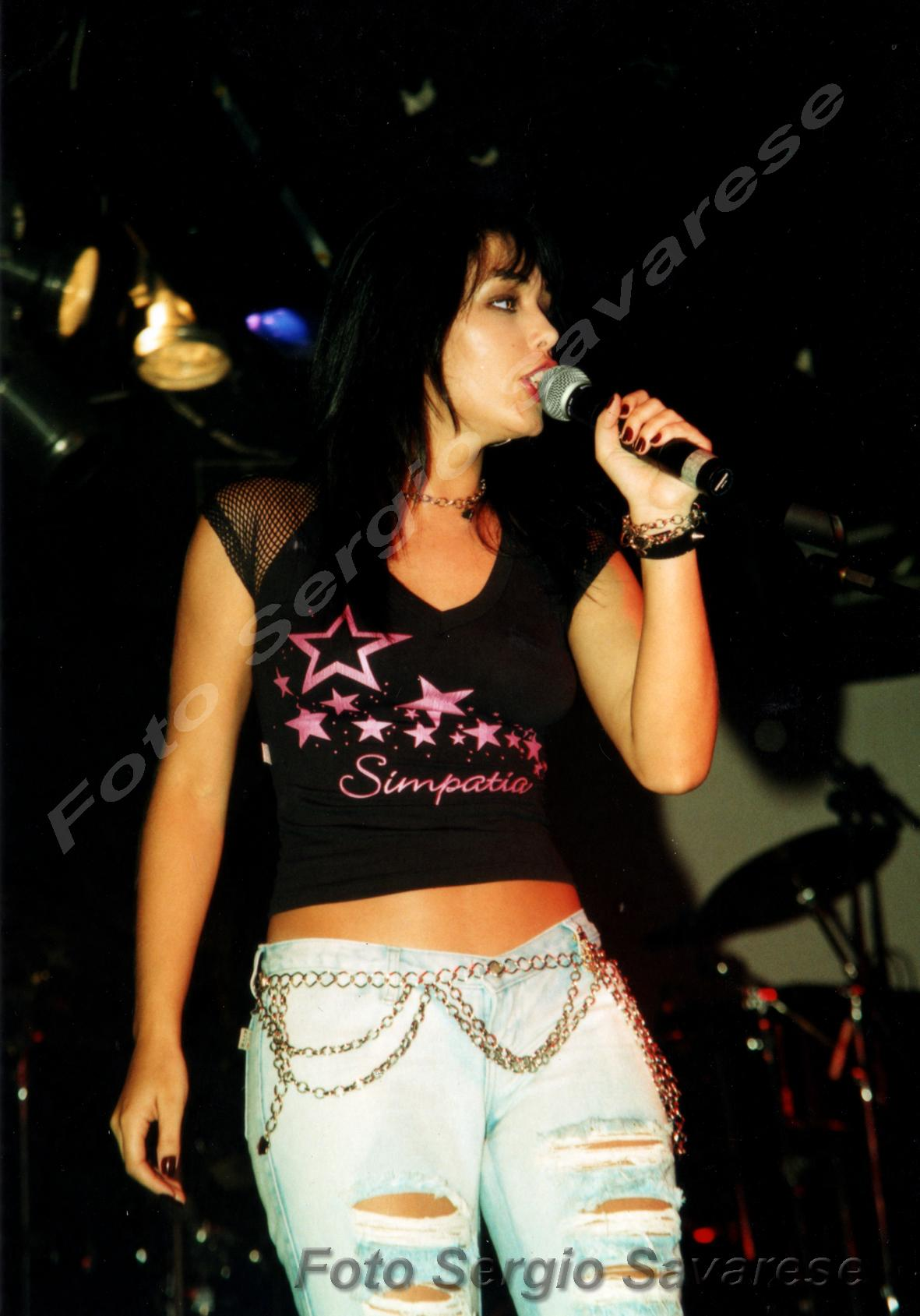

Background information
- Born: Tânia Mara Araújo Almeida; 9 February 1983 (age 43); Brasília, DF, Brazil
- Genre: Pop
- Occupations: Actress, singer
- Years active: 2000–present
- Labels: EMI, Abril
- Website: taniamara.com.br

Tânia Mara Araújo Almeida (born 9 February 1983) is a Brazilian singer and actress.

== Music career ==
Mara is best known for the songs "Se Quiser", a cover of Kelly Clarkson's 2003 song "Anytime" included on the soundtrack to the telenovela Páginas da Vida, and "Sonho Lindo", which is used as the theme for the telenovela Desejo Proibido.

She is married to Jayme Monjardim, film director and director of Rede Globo network soap operas. In September 2010, Mara gave birth to their first child, a daughter, named after Monjardim's famous mother, Maysa.

== Studio albums ==
Album Title	Album details	Peak chart positions		
Album Title	Album details	BRA	Top 40	POR
Tânnia Mara	Released: August 23, 2000; Label: EMI; Format: CD, download digital	—	—	—
Brincando de Amor	Released: 2001; Label: Abril Music; Format: CD, download digital	—	—	—
Louca Paixão	Released: 2005; Label: EMI Music; Format: CD, download digital	—	—	—
Tânia Mara	Released: September 2006; Label: EMI Music; Format: CD, download digital	1	1	1
Falando de Amor – Ao Vivo	Released: June 12, 2009; Label: EMI Music; Format: CD, download digital	—	—	—
Acústico	Released: December 2011; Label: Som Livre; Format: CD, download digital	—	—	—
Só Vejo Você	Released: August 8, 2014; Label: Som Livre; Format: CD, download digital	—	—	—

== Live albums ==
Album Title	Album details	Peak chart positions	
Album Title	Album details	BRA	Top 40
Falando de Amor – Ao Vivo	Released: June 12, 2009; Label: EMI Music; Format: CD, download digital		
Acústico	Released: December 2011; Label: Som Livre; Format: CD, download digital	—	—

=== Singles ===
Year	Single	BRA	POR	RUS	Album
2000	"Tem que Ser com Você"	—	—	—	Tânnia Mara
2000	"Chega"	59	1	1	Tânnia Mara
2001	"Baby I Love You"	—	—	—	Brincando de Amor
2005	"Louca Paixão"	—	—	—	Louca Paixão
2006	"Se Quiser"	1	1	1	Tânia Mara
2007	"Febre de Amor"	29	1	1	Tânia Mara
2007	"Sonho Lindo"	35	1	1	Desejo Proibido
2008	"Um Tempo de Paixão"	55	1	1	Tânia Mara
2009	"Não Me Ame" (feat. Alexandre Pires)	19	1	1	Falando de Amor
2009	"Gostava Tanto de Você"	12	1	1	Falando de Amor
2011	"Recomeçar (Volver a Comenzar)"	—	—	—	Acústico
2011	"CD's e Livros"	—	—	—	Acústico
2014	"Só Vejo Você"	17	1	1	Só Vejo Você
2014	"Me Deixa Levar"	—	—	—	Só Vejo Você
2016	"Teu Lugar" (feat. Marcos & Belutti)	68	1	1	TBA
2017	"Pra Rua"	71	1	1	TBA

=== Soundtracks ===
Year	Song	Album
2005	"Louca Paixão"	América Rodeio
2006	"Se Quiser"	Páginas da Vida Nacional
2007	"Sonho Lindo" (opening theme)	Desejo Proibido Nacional
