= A Vida da Gente =

Brazilian telenovela

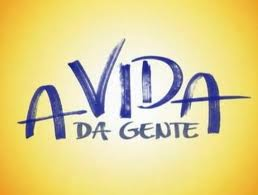
- Genre: Telenovela; Family drama; Slice of life
- Created by: Lícia Manzo
- Written by: Lícia Manzo; Marcos Bernstein; Álvaro Ramos; Carlos Gregório; Giovana Moraes; Marta Góes; Tati Bernardi; Daniel Adjafre; Dora Castellar
- Directed by: Jayme Monjardim; Fabrício Mamberti; Teresa Lampreia; Adriano Melo; Luciano Sabino; Leonardo Nogueira
- Starring: Fernanda Vasconcellos; Marjorie Estiano; Rafael Cardoso; Thiago Lacerda; (See full cast list)
- Theme music composer: Caetano Veloso
- Opening theme: "Oração ao Tempo" by Maria Gadú
- Composer: Alexandre de Faria
- Country of origin: Brazil
- Original language: Portuguese
- No. of episodes: 137

Production
- Production locations: Porto Alegre, Rio Grande do Sul; Gramado, Rio Grande do Sul; Canela, Rio Grande do Sul; Bonito, Mato Grosso do Sul; Buenos Aires; Ushuaia, Tierra del Fuego
- Camera setup: Multi-camera
- Running time: 34–55 minutes
- Production company: Central Globo de Produção

Original release
- Network: Rede Globo
- Release: 26 September 2011 – 2 March 2012

A Vida da Gente (English: The Life We Lead) is a Brazilian telenovela that was broadcast by TV Globo in 2011 and 2012.

The Life We Lead tells the touching story of two sisters, Ana and Manuela. The telenovela is about the love triangle between Ana, Manuela and Rodrigo, and family dramas lived by them after a tragic accident.

Starring Fernanda Vasconcellos, Marjorie Estiano, Rafael Cardoso, and Thiago Lacerda.

== Plot ==
Drama, emotion, and love permeate the unconventional family ties in The Life We Lead. This brightly intensive telenovela reveals that love is the only thing that can sustain and nurture when life doesn't go according to plan.

Ana is a promising tennis player with a collection of titles and trophies to flaunt. She finds out she is pregnant by her loving boyfriend Rodrigo. Her controlling mother, Eva, forces her to break up with Rodrigo and compels her to stay out of town until the baby is born. Eva's biggest concern is that she doesn't lose any of her sponsorship deals. Later, Ana returns home and is eager to resume her athletic career, raise her baby Julia, and tell Rodrigo the truth. As always, she counts on her best friend and sister, Manuela, to give her support. But Eva lies to everyone, including Rodrigo, and says that Julia is the girls' sister, a result from a fling she had in the past. Throughout their lives, Eva had always been extremely overprotective and loving towards Ana but she never had a warm relationship with Manuela. On the contrary, Eva always went out of her way to put Manuela down. Ana and Manuela no longer wish to live side by side with their oppressive mother and deal with her unstable temperament. They decide to drive to their grandmother’s home, so they take off in the middle of the night with baby Julia. But they get into a horrible car accident on the way and Ana is left in a deep coma.

As time passes and there seems to be no progress in Ana's condition, Manuela takes over the role of Julia's mother. Devastated and feeling guilty, Manuela tells Rodrigo that Julia is really his daughter. Together, they go through all the difficulties and delights of raising a child and begin to feel a deep connection and love for each other. Five years later, Julia is a confident and happy child who turned to Manuela in her mother's absence although it was always made clear to her that she was really Ana's daughter.

But suddenly, Ana awakens from the coma to face a very different reality than what she remembers. Now she must deal with the mixed feelings provided by the life that she missed. She is happy to see a healthy, grown Julia and thankful to Manuela for looking after her daughter as if she was her own. But she is frustrated for not being able to express the choked up feelings she still has for Rodrigo and also envies Manuela for leading the life that belonged to her. Ana can still count on her loving sister to give her support in adapting to her new life until Eva finally succeeds in setting the girls against each other. She reassures Manuela that her feelings for Rodrigo remain in the past and even reveals that she has a crush on her doctor, Lucio. But deep down she strives to repress the love she still feels for Rodrigo.

Ana's great struggle to recover the life that went on without her is only surpassed because of positive attitude, persistence, and especially love. Her relationship with Manuela and the dedication of those who come to know her, reveal that unconditional love is the only thing that can overcome life's unexpected turnarounds. With radiant, colorful photography and breathtaking locations, The Life We lead is a moving telenovela that reveals how love can reunite families and even conquer the greatest hardships.

== Cast ==
- Fernanda Vasconcellos as Ana Fonseca, a promising tennis player who falls into a coma after a tragic accident
- Marjorie Estiano as Manuela Fonseca, Ana's older sister and best friend, who later becomes a buffet owner
- Rafael Cardoso as Rodrigo Viana Macedo, Ana and Manuela's stepbrother, and Ana's childhood love. After the accident, he becomes Manuela's husband
- Thiago Lacerda as Dr. João Lúcio Pereira Pires, a widowed neurosurgeon who took care of Ana during the coma
- Ana Beatriz Nogueira as Eva Ribeiro Fonseca, Ana and Manuela's mother, who is overprotective towards Ana and indifferent towards Manuela
- Nicette Bruno as Iná Ribeiro, Ana and Manuela's grandmother
- Stênio Garcia as Laudelino, Iná's boyfriend
- Gisele Fróes as Vitória Azevedo Prates, Ana's tennis trainer, and Alice's birth mother
- Sthefany Brito as Alice Ybarra Morais, a friend of Ana and Manuela, who is searching for her birth mother
- Eriberto Leão as Gabriel, Manuela's boyfriend after she broke up with Rodrigo
- Jesuela Moro as Júlia Fonseca, Ana and Rodrigo's daughter, raised by him with Manuela
- Paulo Betti as Jonas Macedo, Rodrigo's father, and Eva's ex-husband
- Regiane Alves as Cristiane "Cris" Oliveira Macedo, Jonas's personal trainer at the beginning, later becomes his wife
- Maria Eduarda de Carvalho as Fernanda "Nanda" Viana Macedo, Rodrigo's older sister
- Leonardo Medeiros as Lourenço Luiz Macedo, Rodrigo's uncle, a literature teacher
- Leona Cavalli as Dr. Celina Prado Sampaio, Lourenço's wife and Lúcio's co-worker at the hospital, a pediatrician
- Kaic Crescente as Tiago Oliveira Macedo, Jonas and Cris's son
- Júlia Almeida as Lorena, Laudelino's granddaughter and Tiago's nanny
- Ângelo Antônio as Marcos Prates, Vitória's husband
- Malu Galli as Dora, Marcos's love interest
- Daniela Escobar as Suzana Ybarra Morais, Alice's adoptive mother
- Marcello Airoldi as Cícero Morais, Alice's adoptive father
- Alice Wegmann as Sofia Azevedo Prates, Vitória and Marcos's oldest daughter, a tennis player
  - Júlia Gomes as young Sofia, at the beginning
- Marat Descartes as Lui, Nanda's love interest
- Tadeu di Pietro as Cléber, Jonas's lawyer
- Neusa Borges as Maria, Jonas's housekeeper at the beginning, later becomes co-owner of the Manuela's buffet
- Marcello Melo Jr. as Matias, Maria's son and Lorena's boyfriend, a gardener at Jonas's house
- Klebber Toledo as João, Alice's boyfriend
- Malu Valle as Vivian "Vivi" Mourão, Cris's best friend, a member of the high society of Rio Grande do Sul
- Luiz Carlos Vasconcelos as Renato Nogueira Martins, Alice's birth father
- Luiz Serra as Wilson, Laudelino's best friend and Moema's love interest, who has obsessive–compulsive disorder
- Cláudia Mello as Moema, Iná's hypochondriac friend
- Duda Mamberti as Josias, Iná's employee at her dance house
- Rita Clemente as Aurélia, Iná's neighbour
- Sylvia Massari as Ângela, executive secretary in Jonas's office
- Pietra Pan as Bárbara Azevedo Prates, Vitória and Marcos's youngest daughter
  - Nathália Costa as young Bárbara, at the beginning
- Rafael Almeida as Miguel, Sofia's love interest
- Anna Rita Cerqueira as Olívia, Dora's daughter
  - Bia Petrenchunk as young Olívia, at the beginning
- Victor Navega Motta as Francisco, Lui's son
- Francisco Cuoco as Mariano Villaça, a businessman who sponsors athletes, later Vitória's love interest
- Polliana Aleixo as Cecília Villaça, Mariano's granddaughter, a tennis player

== Awards and nominations ==
Year	Association	Category	Nominated	Result	Ref.
2011	Quem Awards	Best actress	Ana Beatriz Nogueira	Nominated	
2011	Quem Awards	Best supporting actress	Marjorie Estiano	Won	
2011	Best of the Year (Domingão do Faustão)	Best Child Actor or Actress	Jesuela Moro	Won	
2011	Best of the Year (Caras)	Best protagonist	Marjorie Estiano	Won	
2011	Noveleiros Awards	Best telenovela	Lícia Manzo	Won	
2011	Contigo Awards	Best telenovela	Lícia Manzo	Nominated	
2011	Contigo Awards	Best Author	Lícia Manzo	Won	
2011	Contigo Awards	Best Actress	Ana Beatriz Nogueira	Nominated	
2011	Contigo Awards	Best Actress	Fernanda Vasconcellos	Nominated	
2011	Contigo Awards	Best Actress	Marjorie Estiano	Nominated	
2011	Contigo Awards	Best Actor	Rafael Cardoso	Nominated	
2011	Contigo Awards	Best Actor	Thiago Lacerda	Nominated	
2011	Contigo Awards	Best supporting actress	Gisele Fróes	Nominated	
2011	Contigo Awards	Best supporting actress	Nicette Bruno	Nominated	
2011	Contigo Awards	Best supporting actress	Regiane Alves	Nominated	
2011	Contigo Awards	Best supporting actor	Stênio Garcia	Nominated	
2011	Contigo Awards	Best child actress	Anna Rita Cerqueira	Nominated	
2011	Contigo Awards	Best child actress	Jesuela Moro	Won	
2011	Contigo Awards	Best child actress	Pietra Pan	Nominated	
2011	Contigo Awards	Best child actor	Kaic Crescente	Nominated	
2011	Contigo Awards	Best child actor	Victor Navega Motta	Nominated	
2011	Contigo Awards	Best director	Jayme Monjardim and Fabrício Mamberti	Nominated	
2012	Extra Awards	Best telenovela	Lícia Manzo	Nominated	
2012	Extra Awards	Best Actress	Marjorie Estiano	Nominated	
2012	Extra Awards	Best Child Actress	Jesuela Moro	Nominated	

=== Recognitions ===
Minha Novela (2011), Critic's Choice:

- Best Actress, (Marjorie Estiano).
- Best Child Actress (Jesuela Moro).
- Best Child Actor (Kaic Crescente).
- Best Telenovela.

== Reception ==
‘The Life We Lead‘ won over audiences in Brazil and abroad. Licensed for 139 countries, the telenovela is the second largest sales success of TV Globo. In Uruguay (Teledoce), Costa Rica (Teletica) and Ecuador (Ecuavisa) the telenovela was leader in its timeslot. In Portugal, on the Basic Globo channel, the show was one of the most-watched programs on cable TV in the country. ‘The Life We Lead‘ also had its rights acquired by the channels Fox (the Netherlands), MundoFox (Hispanic United States), TDM (Macau), VIVA Plus (Israel), Abu Dhabi TV, and ABS-CBN (the Philippines), among others.
