= Marjorie Estiano =

Brazilian actress and singer (born 1982)

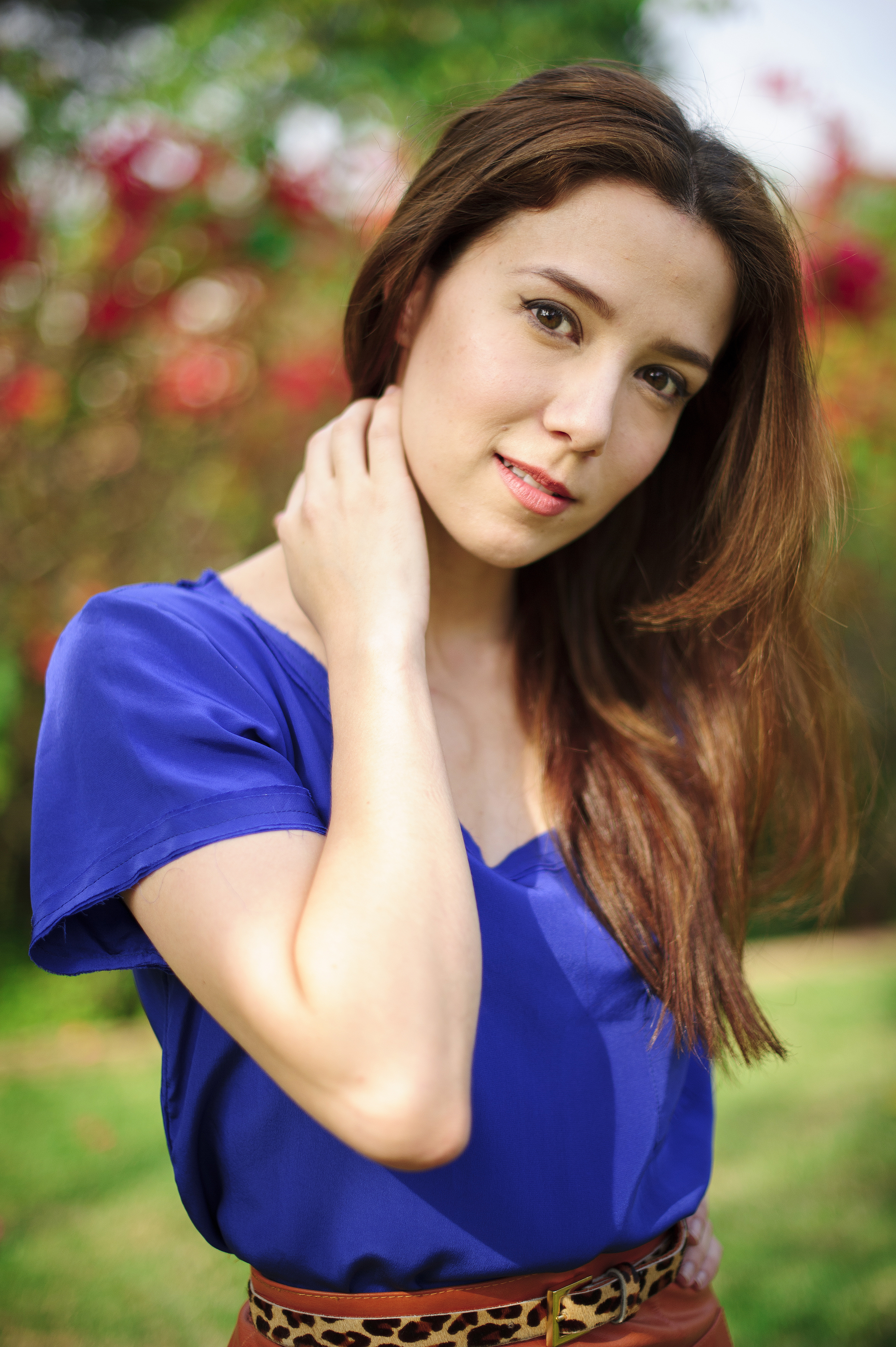
- Estiano in September 2012
- Born: Marjorie Dias de Oliveira; 8 March 1982 (age 44); Curitiba, Paraná, Brazil
- Occupations: Actress; singer; songwriter
- Years active: 1998–present
- Musical career
- Genres: Pop; rock
- Years active: 2002–present
- Labels: Universal Music (2004–2008); Tratore (2014–present)
- Website: Marjorie Estiano

Marjorie Dias de Oliveira (born 8 March 1982), known professionally as Marjorie Estiano (Brazilian Portuguese: [maʁʒoˈɾi estʃiˈɐnu]), is a Brazilian actress and singer-songwriter. She became nationally known for her role in TV Globo's teen soap opera Malhação.

In film, Estiano was the lead role in Time and the Wind, Good Manners, among others.

In television, she was the lead role in three telenovelas, including International Emmy Award-winning Side by Side, and four series. In 2019, she was nominated for the International Emmy Award for Best Actress for her role in Under Pressure.

== Biography ==
Born in Curitiba, Paraná, to Eurandir Lima de Oliveira and Marilene Dias, the second of three siblings, Marjorie Estiano studied Scenic Arts at the Escola Estadual do Paraná. After graduating, she moved to São Paulo to improve her acting abilities. There, she studied music for two years at the Faculdade Paulista de Artes.

== Career ==
While studying, she made some TV commercials and played minor plays in theater. After this, she was approved in the TV Globo Actor's Workshop and moved to Rio de Janeiro. She then signed to join the cast of Malhação, and began acting in minor roles. She won the lead antagonist role of "Natasha" in 2004.

She began sharing the vocals of the band with singer, Gustavo (Guilherme Berenguer). Victor Pozas and Alexandre Castilho started recording demo tapes with Estiano and sending them to record labels. Universal Music was interested, and hired Estiano. After several months in studio, her self-titled debut album was released. The first single, "Você Sempre Será" (You Will Always Be), which was performed previously in Malhação, hit the top of Brazilian charts, and won the Faustão's The Best of the Year award for Song of the Year.

The second single, "Por Mais Que Eu Tente" (The More I Try), was her second top ten hit, and the third single "O Jogo" (The Game) peaked just outside the top ten, but still enjoyed success. Thanks to the enormous airplay of the song "Você Sempre Será", her album went platinum. In 2005 released the first live DVD, titled Marjorie Estiano e Banda Ao Vivo.

In prime time, she stood out in telenovelas Pages of Life (Páginas da Vida) (2006), Duas Caras (2007), India: A Love Story (Caminho das Índias) (2009) and Império.

In 2007, she was the protagonist of the telenovela Two Faces (Duas Caras), which tells the story Maria Paula's revenge against Marconi Ferraço, his former criminal husband. Also in 2007, she released her second studio album, Flores, Amores e Blábláblá.

She played Manuela Fonseca in the 2011 Rede Globo telenovela A Vida da Gente in access prime time. The telenovela is about the love triangle between Ana, Rodrigo and Manuela, and family dramas lived by them after a tragic accident.

During the premiere of the play Mind Deception, actor and producer Malvino Salvador late on Thursday (11th), Rio de Janeiro, Estiano took the opportunity to talk about the work of two that will air in January 2011, called Amor em Quatro Atos (Love in Four Acts). The series of four chapters, will be based on four songs by Chico Buarque: "Between rehearsals and recordings were 20 days of living together and he's great," said the actress, who used to apply a wavy hair to play the part. In the chapter she makes movies, plays a filmmaker called Marjorie involved in filming the video for the song "Construction" and in the middle of the episode will complain about the noise of the work and know the neighbor's character Malvino, the role of Mason.

She played the protagonist Laura Assunção in Lado a Lado (2012), telenovela that tells the story of a friendship between two women Laura, a white girl, daughter of a baroness, and Isabel, descendant of a poor slave. Based on the novel's trilogy of the same name, by Erico Verissimo, Time and the Wind (2013) follows 150 years of family Terra Cambará and their opponent Amaral family.

In 2014, she was the lead antagonist Cora in Império, best telenovela in the 2015 Emmy International, the story of José Alfredo who builds an empire when he is separated from his love for Cora. She was a married woman who falls in love with another woman in serie Eu que Amo Tanto (2014). In September 2014 she released her third studio album, titled Oito.

The movie Sob Pressão (2016) follows the emergency department doctors and nurses of a precarious public hospital in Rio de Janeiro. She played the character corresponding to Madame de Tourvel in the Brazilian version (2016) of Les Liaisons dangereuses. In Justice (2016), she plays a dancer who became a quadriplegic and suffers euthanasia. In the 1930s movie Entre Irmãs (2017), two sisters separated by fate face prejudice and sexism: one from the big city high society, the other from a group of country renegades. Inspired by the eponymous movie, in 2017 she premiered the series Sob Pressão (2017–2021), where Estiano played Dr. Carolina again and earned her an International Emmy Award for Best Actress.

== Filmography ==
=== Television ===
Year	Title	Role	Notes
2002	Popstars	Participant	1st season
2003	Malhação	Fabiana	10th season, 4 episodes
2004–06	Malhação	Natasha Ferreira	11th–12th season
2005–07	A Turma do Didi	Marjorie Estiano	2 episodes
2006	Páginas da Vida	Marina Martins de Andrade Rangel	
2007	Sob Nova Direção	Nelly Li	Episode: "A Dona da Voz"
2007	Duas Caras	Maria Paula Fonseca do Nascimento	
2009	Caminho das Índias	Antônia "Tônia" Cavinato Cadore	
2010	S.O.S. Emergência	Flávia Menezes	Episode: "Na Saúde e Na Doença"
2011	Amor em Quatro Atos	Letícia	Episode: "Ela Faz Cinema"
2011	A Vida da Gente	Manuela Fonseca	
2012	Lado a Lado	Laura Assunção Vieira / Paulo Lima	
2014	Império	Cora dos Anjos Bastos	
2014	Eu Que Amo Tanto	Angélica	Episode: "Angélica"
2016	Ligações Perigosas	Mariana de Santanna	
2016	Justiça	Beatriz Vieira Pugliesi	Guest
2017–21	Sob Pressão	Dr. Carolina Alencar	Main role; 36 episodes
2023	Fim	Ruth	
2025	Ângela Diniz: Assassinada e Condenada	Ângela Diniz	Main role; 6 episodes
2026	Habeas Corpus	Inez Franco	Main role; 8 episodes

=== Film ===
Year	Title	Role
2011	Malu de Bicicleta	Sueli
2013	Time and the Wind	Bibiana Terra Cambará (young)
2014	Apneia	Giovanna
2015	Garoto	Girl
2016	Sob Pressão	Dr. Carolina Alencar
2017	Entre Irmãs	Emília dos Santos Duarte Coelho
2017	Good Manners	Ana
2018	Todo Clichê do Amor	Dani
2018	Aurora	Mônica
2018	Paraíso Perdido	Milene
2018	A Onda Maldita	Alice
2019	Beatriz	Beatriz
2024	Abraço de Mãe	Ana
2024	I'm Still Here	Eliana Paiva (older)

== Stage ==
Year	Title	Role
1997	Lisístrata	—N/a
1998	A Raposa e as Uvas	—N/a
1998	Casa de Bernarda Alba	—N/a
1999	Clarice	—N/a
2000	O Palhaço Imaginador	—N/a
2001	Liberdade, Liberdade	—N/a
2002	Buchicho	—N/a
2000–03	Beijos, Escolhas e Bolhas de Sabão	Tati
2003	Bárbara não lhe Adora	Bárbara Cristina
2009–10	Corte Seco	Samantha
2011	Inverno da Luz Vermelha	Christine
2012–13	O Desaparecimento do Elefante	Atashi
2016–17	Fluxorama	Valkirie
2019	Os Sete Afluentes do Rio Ota	-

== Discography ==
- Marjorie Estiano (2005)
- Flores, Amores e Blábláblá (2007)
- Oito (2014)

== Tours ==
- 2005–2006: Marjorie Estiano e Banda (Marjorie Estiano and Band)
- 2007–2008: Turnê Blablablá (Blablabla Tour)
- 2009–2010: Combinação Sobre Todas as Coisas (Combination Above All Things)
- 2013 – 2014: BB Covers
- 2014: Oito
- 2016: Nívea Rock

=== Music recording sales certification ===
- 2005: DVD gold the 25 thousand copies sold of the DVD Marjorie Estiano e Banda (Ao Vivo).
- 2005: Platinum by 150 thousand copies sold of the CD Marjorie Estiano.
- 2009: Download Gold, Por mais que eu tente.

== Awards and nominations ==
Year	Association	Work	Category	Result	Ref.
1999	Festival Theatre Lala Schneider	Clarice	Best Actress in a Leading Role	Won	
2004	Melhores do Ano – Domingão do Faustão	Malhação	Revelation Actress	Nominated	
2004	PopTV – UOL	Malhação	Revelation Actress	Won	
2005	IV Prêmio Jovem Brasileiro (IV Brazilian Youth Award)	Malhação	Best Actress in a Leading Role	Won	
2005	Melhores do Ano – Domingão do Faustão	"Você Sempre Será"	Song of The Year	Won	
2005	Trophy Leão Lobo	Marjorie Estiano	Singer Revelation	Won	
2005	Meus Prêmios Nick	Marjorie Estiano	Singer Revelation	Won	
2006	Prêmio Multishow de Música Brasileira	Marjorie Estiano	Singer Revelation	Won	
2006	Prêmio Minha Novela	Páginas da Vida	Best Actress in a Supporting Role	Won	
2007	Troféu Imprensa	Páginas da Vida	Revelation Actress	Nominated	
2007	Prêmio Contigo! de TV	Páginas da Vida	Best Actress in a Supporting Role	Nominated	
2007	Melhores do Ano – Domingão do Faustão	Páginas da Vida	Best Actress in a Supporting Role	Nominated	
2008	Capricho Awards	Duas Caras	Best National Actress	Nominated	
2009	Meus Prêmios Nick	Caminho das Índias	Favorite Actress	Nominated	
2009	Capricho Awards	Caminho das Índias	Best National Actress	Nominated	
2011	Arte Qualidade Brasil	Inverno da Luz Vermelha	Best Actress in a Leading Role	Won	
2011	17º Guarani Film Festival	Malu de Bicicleta	Best Actress in a Supporting Role	Nominated	
2011	MZOTV	A Vida da Gente	Favorite actress	Nominated	
2011	Caras-Digital	A Vida da Gente	Best Protagonist	Won	
2011	Prêmio Quem de Televisão	A Vida da Gente	Best Actress in a Supporting Role	Won	
2011	Meus Prêmios Nick	A Vida da Gente	Favorite TV character	Nominated	
2012	Prêmio Extra de Televisão	A Vida da Gente	Best Actress in a Leading Role	Nominated	
2012	Noveleiros	Lado a Lado	Best Romantic Couple in Telenovela (with Thiago Fragoso)	Won	
2013	Prêmio Contigo! de TV	Lado a Lado	Best Actress in a leading Role	Nominated	
2013	Teledossiê	Lado a Lado	Best Actress in a leading Role	Nominated	
2013	Retrospectiva UOL	Lado a Lado	Best Actress in a leading Role	Nominated	
2013	Trans Brasil TV	Lado a Lado	Best Actress in a leading Role and Best singer	Nominated	
2013	APTR	O Desaparecimento do Elefante	Best Actress in a Supporting Role	Nominated	
2013	Aplauso Brasil	O Desaparecimento do Elefante	Best Actress in a Supporting Role	Won	
2013	Arte Qualidade Brasil	O Desaparecimento do Elefante	Best Actress in a leading Role	Nominated	
2014	MegaHertz	Império	Best Actress in a leading Role	Nominated	
2015	Troféu Internet	Império	Best Actress in a leading Role	Nominated	
2015	11º FIESP/SESI-SP	Apneia	Best Actress in a Supporting Role	Nominated	
2015	MIFF AWARDS of Milan	Apneia	Best Actress in a Supporting Role	Nominated	
2016	Melhor do cinema	Sob Pressão	Best Actress in a Supporting Role	Nominated	
2017	Sesc Cine	Sob Pressão	Best Actress in a leading Role	Nominated	
2017	Festival de Cinema do Rio	As Boas Maneiras	Best Actress in a Supporting Role	Won	
2017	Notícias da TV	Sob Pressão	Best Actress in a series	Won	
2017	Melhores do Ano – Domingão do Faustão	Sob Pressão	Best Actress in a series	Won	
2017	Prêmio F5	Sob Pressão	Best Actress in a series	Won	
2017	Prêmio Contigo! de TV	Sob Pressão	Best Actress in a series	Won	
2017	Trophy APCA	Sob Pressão	Best Actress in a leading Role	Nominated	
2018	UOL TV	Sob Pressão	Best Actress in a leading Role	Won	
2018	15º Zinegoak – Bilbao Film Festival	As Boas Maneiras	Best Actress in a Supporting Role	Won	
2018	Prêmio Extra de Televisão	Sob Pressão	Best Actress in a Lead Role	Nominated	
2018	23° Guarani Film Festival	Entre Irmãs	Best Actress in a Lead Role	Nominated	
2018	Grande Prêmio do Cinema Brasileiro	Entre Irmãs	Best Actress in a Lead Role	Nominated	
2018	12º FIESP/SESI-SP	Entre Irmãs	Best Actress in a series	Won	
2018	Trophy APCA	Sob Pressão	Best Actress in a Lead Role	Won	
2018	Biarritz International Festival of Audiovisual Programming	Sob Pressão	Best Actress in a series	Won	
2019	International Emmy Award	Sob Pressão	Best Performance By an Actress	Nominated	
2019	Melhores do Ano – Domingão do Faustão	Sob Pressão	Best Actress in a series	Nominated	

=== Recognitions ===
- 2011: Best Actress, Critic's Choice – Minha Novela, for A Vida da Gente.
- 2012: Best romantic couple, Critic's Choice – Minha Novela, for Lado a Lado.
- 2014: Best Villains, Critic's Choice – Noveleiros, for Império.
