= Flores, Amores e Blábláblá =

Studio album by Marjorie Estiano
- Released: May 4, 2007 (Brazil)
- Recorded: 2006–2007; Vital Studios (Rio de Janeiro); Mister M Studios (Rio de Janeiro)
- Genres: Pop; soul; R&B; EDM
- Length: 48:11
- Label: Universal Music
- Producers: Victor Pozas, Alexandre Castilho

Marjorie Estiano chronology
Marjorie Estiano (2005)	Flores, Amores e Blábláblá (2007)

Singles from Flores, Amores e Blábláblá
- 1. "Espirais" Released: 2006 / 2007 (Re-release); 2. "Tatuagem" Released: 2007

Professional ratings
Review scores
Source	Rating
Nood	3/5 stars

Flores, Amores e Blábláblá is the second album by Brazilian pop singer Marjorie Estiano. It is a blend of pop, soul, R&B, house, EDM, and trance. For Flores, Amores e Blábláblá she brings a cover of the Beatles song "Oh! Darling", a melancholic "Doce Novembro" (Sweet November) and an agitated "Tatuagem" (Tattoo), composed by Rita Lee.

== Track listing ==
1. Tatuagem (Tattoo)
2. Ponto de Partida (Starting Point)
3. Espirais (Spirals)
4. Meu Tempo (My Time)
5. Jeito Zen (Zen Way)
6. Oh! Darling
7. Branquela (Whitey)
8. Flores (Flowers)
9. Essencial (Essential)
10. Outras Intenções (Other Intentions)
11. Alucinados (Hallucinated)
12. Doce Novembro (Sweet November)
13. Desencanto (Disenchantment)
14. Boogie Woogie

== Singles ==
Information
"Espirais"
- Released: 2006 / 2007 (Re-Release)
- Writers: Alexandre Castilho, Alexandre Lemos
- Producer: Victor Pozas, Alexandre Castilho
- Charts: #10 (BRA)
"Tatuagem"
- Released: 2007
- Writers: André Aquino, Rita Lee, Lancaster
- Producer: Victor Pozas, Alexandre Castilho
- Charts: #15 (BRA)
