= Selma Reis =

Brazilian actress and singer

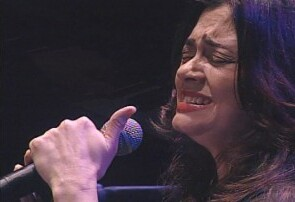
- Reis in 2012
- Born: 24 August 1960; São Gonçalo, Rio de Janeiro, Brazil
- Died: 19 December 2015 (aged 55); Teresópolis, Rio de Janeiro, Brazil
- Occupations: Actress, singer
- Spouse: Locca Faria (div.)
- Children: 1

Selma Reis (24 August 1960 – 19 December 2015) was a Brazilian actress and singer.

Born in São Gonçalo, Rio de Janeiro, she acted in various telenovelas and miniseries for Rede Globo, including Caminho das Índias, Páginas da Vida, Presença de Anita and Chiquinha Gonzaga. After time spent studying music in Nantes, France, in 1987, she released an eponymous debut album, the first of eleven releases.

She was married to photographer Locca Faria, with whom she had a son. The couple separated but remained friends for the last three years of her life.

In July 2014, Reis was diagnosed with brain cancer, and was treated at a hospital in Teresópolis. She was cremated in a Lutheran service in Nova Friburgo.
