= Marjorie Estiano (album) =

Studio album by Marjorie Estiano
- Released: July 21, 2005 (Brazil)
- Recorded: 2004–2005
- Genre: Pop rock
- Label: Universal Music
- Producer: Victor Pozas; Alexandre Castilho

Marjorie Estiano chronology
Marjorie Estiano (2005)	Flores, Amores e Blábláblá (2007)

Singles from Marjorie Estiano
- 1. "Você Sempre Será"; 2. "Por Mais que Eu Tente"; 3. "As Horas"; 4. "So Easy"; 5. "Versos Mudos (Promo Only)"; 6. "O Jogo (Promo Only)"

Marjorie Estiano is the debut studio album by Brazilian singer Marjorie Estiano, released in 2005. The album was responsible for setting Marjorie to superstardom, along with her role in Brazilian teen soap opera Malhação, in 2004 and 2005.

== Track listing ==
1. "So Easy"
2. "Você Sempre Será (You'll Always Be)"
3. "Por Mais Que Eu Tente (The More I Try)"
4. "As Horas (The Hours)"
5. "O Jogo (The Game)"
6. "Reflexo do Amor (Reflection of Love)"
7. "Versos Mudos (Mute Verses)" — feat. LS Jack
8. "O Que Tiver Que Ser (What Is Meant To Be)"
9. "Partes de Você (Parts of You)"
10. "Sem Direção (No Direction)"
11. "Tudo Passa (Everything Passes)"

== Charts ==
=== Year-end charts ===
Chart (2005)	Peak position
Brazilian Albums (Pro-Música Brasil)	20

== Sales ==
Chart	Certification	Sales
Brasil	Platinum	250,000

== Personnel ==
- Vini Rosa: Guitar and Acoustic Guitar;
- André Vasconselos: Bass;
- Daniel Gordon: Drums and Percussion;
- Lancaster: Bass;
- George Fonseca: Keyboards;
- Christiaan Oyens: Drums and Lap Steel Guitar;
- André Aquino: Acoustic Guitar;
- Victor Pozas: Keyboards;
- Roberto Pollo: Keyboards;
- Alexandre Castilho: Guitar;
- Cristiano Gualda: Backing Vocal;
- Juliano Cortuah: Backing Vocal;
- Diogo Garneiro: Drums and Percussion;
- Marcelo Martins: Sax;
- Jeziel: Trumpet;
- Renata Ly: Backing Vocal;
- Cecilia Spyer: Backing Vocal;
- Milton Guedes: Harmonica;
- João Jaques: Acoustic Guitar;
- LS Jack: Guest appearance.
