= Mell Muzzillo =

Brazilian actress and dancer (born 2005)

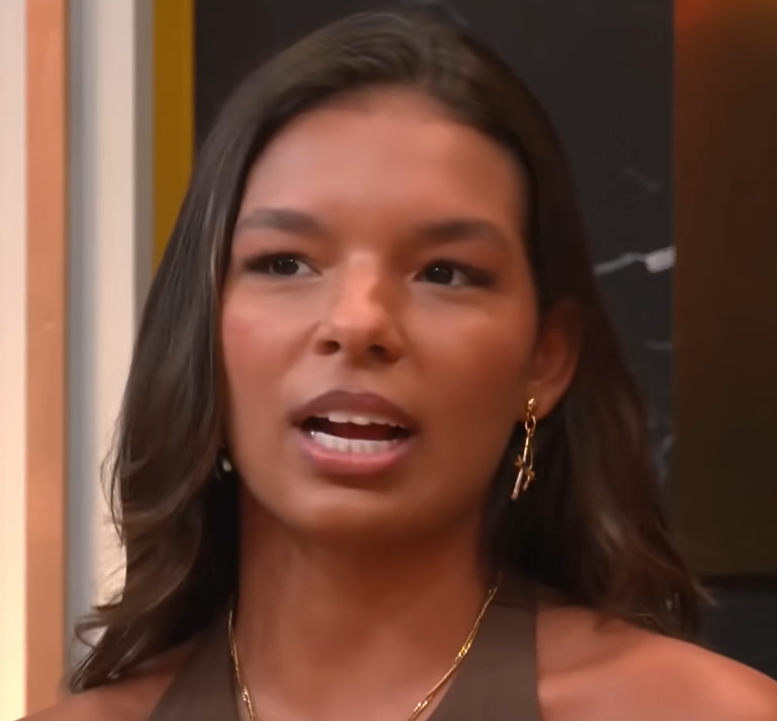
- Muzzillo in 2026
- Born: Mellissa Muzzillo Arruda; June 4, 2005 (age 21); Nilópolis, Rio de Janeiro, Brazil
- Citizenship: Brazilian
- Occupation: Actress
- Years active: 2013–present
- Notable work: Ritinha, in Renascer (2024); Maggye, in Três Graças

Mellissa Monteiro Muzzillo Arruda (born June 4, 2005), known as Mell Muzzillo, is a Brazilian actress and dancer of Indigenous descent from the Tupinambá people of southern Bahia. She made her debut on TV Globo in the soap opera Renascer in the role of Ritinha, with her first appearance in the soap opera on February 17, 2024. As a child, she acted in the telenovela Gaby Estrella, produced by Gloob, the Globo Group’s children’s channel.

Before her television debut, she became known on TikTok for doing voice-overs of actress Ísis Valverde and has over 1 million followers on the platform.

== Biography ==
=== Early years and education ===
The daughter of Valdemir Arruda and Carla Muzzillo, who are originally from Alcobaça in southern Bahia, Mell was born and raised in Nilópolis, in the Baixada Fluminense region of the state of Rio de Janeiro.

When she was just six years old, she began taking theater classes with the actress Zaira Zambelli. She also trained in dance, which she began at the age of two, eventually receiving a scholarship to study ballet at the Maria Olenewa Dance School, part of the Municipal Theater of Rio de Janeiro, in addition to taking jazz and belly dance classes.

=== Career ===
She got her first break as an actress on the TV series Gaby Estrella, which aired on Gloob, the Globo Group’s children’s cable channel. In 2018, she was awarded first place as a dancer and choreographer at the Joinville Dance Festival.

Active on TikTok, where she has over a million followers, Mell gained national recognition after catching the eye of casting director Marcella Bergamo and being cast in the remake of the soap opera Renascer, where she played Ritinha, a character originally portrayed by Isabel Fillardis; Originally a maid in the household of José Inocêncio (played by Marcos Palmeira in this version, and by Antônio Fagundes in the original version), Ritinha was reimagined as Inácia’s daughter, and the chemistry between Mell and Edvana Carvalho, who played Inácia, earned praise from both audiences and critics. In addition to Renascer, she appeared in the music video for “Quando a Gente Ama,” a song by Xamã, a fellow cast member on the soap opera.

In 2025, she appeared in the special Falas da Terra, about Brazil’s indigenous peoples, and began filming her role in the movie Sedução, the directorial debut of Marcos Palmeira, her co-star in Renascer. That same year, she was announced as part of the cast of Três Graças, by Aguinaldo Silva, joining the same core cast as Miguel Falabella and Samuel de Assis, who play the adoptive parents of Maggye, her character. In 2026, she participated in the Batalha do Lip Sync, featured on the show Domingão com Huck hosted by Luciano Huck, where she faced off against Gabriela Loran. Mell lip-synced the song “Beedi” by Sukhwinder Singh and Sunidhi Chauhan, in tribute to the soap opera Caminho das Índias created by Glória Perez, and three songs by Brazilian singer Marina Sena: “Por Supuesto”, “Carnaval”, and “Desmitificar.” That same year, she joined the cast of Loquinha, a spin-off of the soap opera Três Graças in the form of a web series distributed by Globoplay, where she continued to play Maggye Damatta.

== Filmography ==
=== Television ===
Year	Title	Role	Notes	Ref.
2013	Gaby Estrella		Supporting role	
2024	Renascer	Rita de Cássia de Jesus Galvão ("Ritinha")		
2025	Falas da Terra (from Falas)	Sandra	Indigenous Peoples special	
2025	Três Graças	Maggye Damatta		
2026	Batalha do Lip Sync	Contestant		

=== Film ===
Year	Title	Role	Notes	Ref.
2026	Sedução	Sheila	Post-production	

=== Music videos ===
Year	Title	Artist	Ref.
2024	"Quando a Gente Ama"	Xamã	

=== Internet ===
Year	Title	Role	Notes	Ref.
2026	Loquinha	Maggye Damatta	Spin-off from Três Graças	

== Personal life ==
A member of the Tupinambá indigenous group, from which she descends on her mother’s side, the actress has a younger brother, Kenay Muzzilo, who is also an actor and has appeared in productions such as the telenovela Velho Chico and the series Sob Pressão.

In November 2024, she began a relationship with fellow actor Marcello Melo Jr., whom she met on the set of Renascer.
