= Renascer =

Renascer may refer to either of two Brazilian telenovelas produced and aired by TV Globo:

- Renascer (1993 TV series)
- Renascer (2024 TV series)
