= Éramos Seis =

Éramos Seis may refer to:

- Éramos Seis (novel), a 1943 Brazilian novel by Maria José Dupré
- Éramos Seis (1994 TV series), a Brazilian telenovela, based on the novel
- Éramos Seis (2019 TV series), a Brazilian telenovela, based on the novel
