= Gabriela Loran =

Brazilian actress

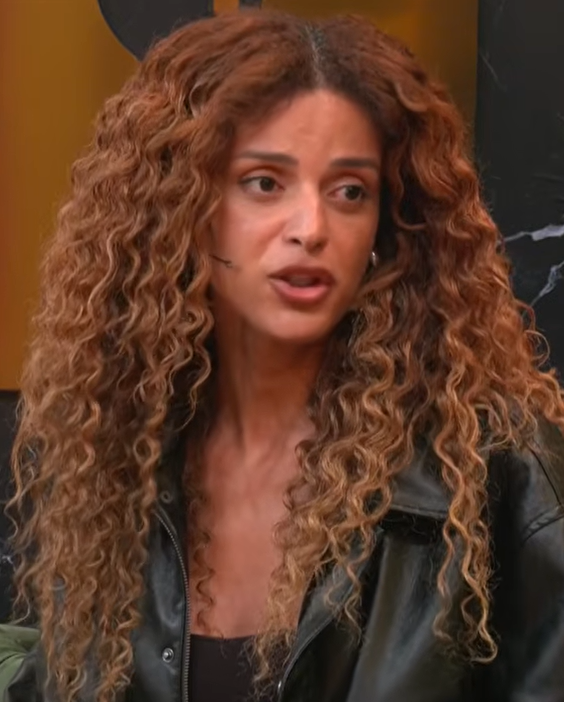
- Loran in 2026
- Born: May 18, 1993 (age 33); São Gonçalo, Rio de Janeiro, Brazil
- Citizenship: Brazilian
- Education: Casa das Artes de Laranjeiras
- Occupation: Actress
- Years active: 2018–present
- Notable work: Malhação: Vidas Brasileiras (as Priscila); Três Graças (as Viviane)

Gabriela Loran (born May 18, 1993) is a Brazilian actress. She is best known for her roles as Priscila in Malhação - Vidas Brasileiras and as Viviane in Três Graças, both on TV Globo. In 2023, she received a nomination for Best Actress at the Los Angeles Brazilian Film Festival for her role as Paulinha in O Último Animal, a film by Leonel Vieira.

== Biography ==
Gabriela Loran was born in São Gonçalo, a city in the Greater Rio de Janeiro. She studied performing arts at Casa das Artes de Laranjeiras (CAL), an arts school located in the Laranjeiras neighborhood of Rio de Janeiro, where she came to identify as transgender and began her transition at age 23. During that time, she worked as a pharmacy clerk and a waitress, and did unpaid work as an actress.

=== Career ===
In 2018, she joined the cast of Malhação, where she played the role of Priscila, a transgender drag queen and dance teacher. As she herself acknowledges, “Malhação opened many doors for me because I was the first trans actress to appear on the show.” However, she emphasizes that despite the title of “Malhação’s first trans actress,” “being trans does not define Gabriela. Gabriela is multifaceted.”

In 2019, she played the role of Paulinha, the daughter of a criminal, in the Portuguese-Brazilian film O Último Animal, directed by Leonel Vieira. The film premiered at the 50th Gramado Film Festival in 2022, and reached international markets the following year. Gabriela celebrated her role in the film for marking several “firsts” in her career: “It was my first leading role, my first nomination, my first international film.” O Último Animal premiered in Portuguese theaters in November 2023, the same month the actress was nominated for Best Actress at the Los Angeles Brazilian Film Festival. The winner was Vera Holtz for the movie Aunt Virginia. In Brazil, the film did not reach theaters until March 2024.

After appearing in several productions on Canal Brasil, in 2021 she was cast in a leading role in the Globoplay series Arcanjo Renegado, where she played Giovanna, the chief of staff to the president of the Legislative Assembly of Rio de Janeiro (Alerj). Following the first season, she joined the series’ regular cast. In 2022, she played the role of Luana, the friend and confidante of the protagonist Clarice, in the Rede Globo soap opera Cara e Coragem. That same year, she joined the cast of the Netflix film A Cut Above. The actress was also part of the cast of the comedy series Novela, a co-production between the comedy group Porta dos Fundos and Amazon Prime Video, in which she stars alongside Monica Iozzi and Miguel Falabella.

In 2024, she plays Maitê, a friend of Isabela/Buba (Gabriela Medeiros), in the TV Globo remake of the soap opera Renascer.. In the original 1993 version of the soap opera, the character did not exist. In 2025, she was cast in Três Graças, by Aguinaldo Silva, returning to the 9 p.m. time slot as the pharmacist Viviane. The character gained popularity with both audiences and critics, becoming one of the show’s main characters. In 2026, she participated in the Batalha do Lip Sync, featured on the show Domingão com Huck hosted by Luciano Huck, where she faced off against Mell Muzzillo. During her performance, the actress sang “Modinha para Gabriela” by Brazilian singer Gal Costa and “RockStar” by Lisa.

== Filmography ==
=== Television ===
Year	Title	Role	Notes	Ref.
2018	Malhação: Vidas Brasileiras	Priscila	Episodes: "March 7–15"	
2020–2021	Perdido	Inayara Birigüi		
2022–present	Arcanjo Renegado	Giovanna Santana		
2022–2023	Cara e Coragem	Luana Novaes		
2023	Novela	Lucrécia		
2024	Renascer	Maitê	Episodes: "March 9 – May 4"	
2024	Body By Beth	Cíntia Braga		
2025	Falas Femininas (from Falas)	Branca / Paquita		
2025	Três Graças	Viviane Fonseca		
2026	Batalha do Lip Sync	Contestant		

=== Film ===
Year	Title	Role	Notes	Ref.
2019	Os Espetaculares	Marcella Eliza		
2022	O Último Animal	Paulinha		
2022	A Cut Above	Adriana Franzão		
2025	Gambiarra: Uga Uga Show	Stella		

== Personal life ==
Since November 2024, Gabriela has been dating the circus performer, who was the runner-up on the sixth season of No Limite, which aired on TV Globo in 2022 and was hosted by Fernando Fernandes and Ana Clara.

=== Transsexuality ===
Gabriela Loran is an activist advocating for trans visibility in the Brazilian media, but she emphasizes that simply gaining that space is not enough:

We’ll only be able to combat prejudice if we’re seen as protagonists. I insist that we have characters with dramatic depth whose focus isn’t on gender identity.

The actress says she never hid her gender identity, but that before studying performing arts, "she didn't know how to put a name to who she was. “Theater was a turning point in my life and helped me bring out who I’ve always been.” She reports that early in her career, she faced prejudice in various forms, ranging from being kicked out of (women’s) restrooms to having to play caricatured transvestites. Even though this burden of transphobia has lessened with her media exposure, it is still present, she emphasizes.

On January 30, 2024, the actress underwent gender reassignment surgery in Thailand, which cost 115,000 reais. In an interview, for newspaper Extra, she stated that she “had always wanted to be a woman since she was a child,” but due to a lack of information, she only realized this was possible after seeing the model Roberta Close on television and Ariadna Arantes on Big Brother Brasil 11. She received full support from her family for the procedure, but also faced attacks on social media after posting a video of herself in the hospital, urinating for the first time following her gender reassignment. She says she had already expected this kind of reaction:

As for the peeing video, I did expect it to be talked about and to reach a lot of people because I’m breaking down barriers and addressing taboos. And, without a doubt, this is very powerful to me because I want to educate people, and I will. And if I came into this world, it was literally to bring knowledge and spread love. So, I’m going to counter all this hate and misinformation with knowledge, information, literacy, and love

== Prizes ==
Year	Award	Category	Nominee	Result	Ref.
2023	Los Angeles Brazilian Film Festival	Best Actress	O Último Animal	Nominated	
2023	Petrópolis Film Festival	Best Actress	O Último Animal	Won	
2025	Citizenship, Rights and Diversity Award	Honorary Award	Combating Discrimination and Advancing Equality	Won	
2025	F5 Prize	Best Supporting Performance	Três Graças	Nominated	
2025	Domingão Awards	Breakout star of the year	Três Graças	Nominated	
