= Éramos Seis (1994 TV series) =

- Cast
- Also known as: "We Were Six"
- Genre: Telenovela
- Created by: Sílvio de Abreu; Rubens Edwald Filho
- Based on: Éramos Seis by Maria José Dupré
- Starring: Irene Ravache
- Country of origin: Brazil
- Original language: Portuguese
- No. of episodes: 180

Production
- Executive producers: Henrique Martins; Del Rangel
- Running time: 45 minutes

Original release
- Network: SBT
- Release: 9 May – 5 December 1994

Éramos Seis (The Six of Us) is a Brazilian telenovela produced by Sistema Brasileiro de Televisão (SBT) in 1994, based on the homonym novel by Maria José Dupré. The television series was written by Sílvio de Abreu and Rubens Ewald Filho and directed by Nilton Travesso, Henrique Martins, and Del Rangel. It was aired from 9 May 1994 through 5 December 1994, in 180 episodes.

It was the fifth adaptation of Dupré's novel to TV: Rede Record made the first version in 1958 and the TV Itacolomi the second in 1960. The Rede Tupi adapted it twice in 1967 and 1977. TV Globo made another version in 2019.

== Plot ==
Éramos Seis chronicles the struggles of a middle-class family in São Paulo through the eyes of its matriarch, Dona Lola.

== Cast ==
- Irene Ravache .... Lola
- Othon Bastos .... Júlio
- Tarcísio Filho .... Alfredo
- Jandir Ferrari .... Carlos
- Luciana Braga .... Maria Isabel
- Leonardo Brício .... Julinho
- Nathália Timberg .... Aunt Emília
- Jussara Freire .... Clotilde
- Denise Fraga .... Olga
- Osmar Prado .... Zeca
- Paulo Figueiredo .... Almeida
- Marco Ricca .... Felício
- Bete Coelho .... Adelaide
- Mayara Magri .... Justina
- Jandira Martini .... Dona Genu
- Marcos Caruso .... Virgulino
- João Vitti .... Lúcio
- Flávia Monteiro .... Lili
- Yara Lins .... Dona Maria
- Wilma de Aguiar .... Tia Candoca
- Eliete Cigarini .... Carmencita
- Antônio Petrin .... Assad
- Angelina Muniz .... Karine
- Luciene Adami .... Maria Laura
- Umberto Magnani .... Alonso
- Nina de Pádua .... Pepa
- Ana Paula Arósio .... Amanda
- Carla Diaz .... Eliana
- Caio Blat .... Carlos (young)

== Awards ==
São Paulo Association of Art Critics Awards

The Associação Paulista dos Críticos de Artes (APCA) honors the best in the fields of stage acting (since 1956), music, literature, film, television, plastic arts (since 1972/1973), and radio (since 1980).

- 1994 – Television: Best Drama
- 1994 – Television: Best Actress – Irene Ravache
- 1994 – Television: Best Supporting Actor – Tarcísio Filho

Troféu Imprensa

- 1994 – Best Drama
- 1994 – Best Actress – Irene Ravache
