= Esperança (TV series) =

Brazilian telenovela

- Genre: Telenovela
- Created by: Benedito Ruy Barbosa; Walcyr Carrasco
- Starring: Reynaldo Gianecchini; Priscila Fantin; Ana Paula Arósio; Fernanda Montenegro; Antônio Fagundes; Raul Cortez; Laura Cardoso; José Mayer; Maria Fernanda Cândido; Nuno Lopes; Walmor Chagas; Lúcia Veríssimo; Gabriela Duarte; Paulo Goulart; Giselle Itié; Simone Spoladore
- Opening theme: "Esperança"
- Composers: Gilbert, Laura Pausini, Alejandro Sanz and Fama Coral
- Country of origin: Brazil
- Original language: Portuguese
- No. of seasons: 1
- No. of episodes: 209

Production
- Production locations: Brazil; Italy
- Running time: 60 minutes

Original release
- Network: Rede Globo
- Release: 17 June 2002 – 14 February 2003

Related
- O Clone; Mulheres Apaixonadas

Esperança (Hope Land) is a Brazilian telenovela produced and aired by Rede Globo between 17 June 2002 and 14 February 2003.

With Reynaldo Gianecchini, Priscila Fantin, Maria Fernanda Cândido, Ana Paula Arósio, Raul Cortez, Antonio Fagundes, José Mayer and Fernanda Montenegro interpreted their main roles.

== Plot ==
=== Main Plot ===
1930s: Toni lives with his parents, Rosa and Genaro in Civita, a small town in Italy. He is in love with Maria, who dreams of building a family; and it also matches the love he feels for her. But this love is not approved by Giuliano, father of Maria, who does not accept his daughter's relationship with a boy of lower social class to it. Toni's communist uncle, Giuseppe, start telling him stories about life in Brazil. So Toni is enthusiastic about what he hear about Brazil and makes a decision: Traveling with Maria to São Paulo, so that together they can build the life they had both dreamed of. But Giuliano does not allow Maria to travel with Toni abroad and this gets to face it. Giuliano prevents Maria's departure. Toni then embarks alone, but promises to return to seek Maria so able to stabilize in Brazil. After his departure, Maria discovers she is pregnant and is forced to marry Martino fascist. Toni travels with no idea of Maria's pregnancy.

Once he arrives in São Paulo, Toni finds work in a cabinet, Ezekiel's property, a Jew who helped him a lot and took him in his family home. No news of Maria, Toni soaking up the daughter of his boss, the Machiavellian Camilla and the two live a beautiful but conflicted romance. Martino, husband of Maria, engages in political conflicts, and feels obliged to leave Italy. The fate takes him in Brazil, and with it brings Maria and their son Martininho. But Martino is murdered, and Maria is a widow. When Toni and Maria are in Brazil, he is torn between her love and Camilla.

=== Parallel Plots ===
Debates and political discussions took place on the famous board of Marius. And those involved in them were college José Manoel, Philip, Mark and Rafael, debating recurring themes of the era in which they lived. José Manuel, a Portuguese student and dubbed "Murruga", falls in love with Nina, a nurse and working with strong ideals of struggle, strength and justice. She had become a volunteer at the field hospital to support the Paulistas fighters. In one of the battles José Manoel is injured, and is saved by care nurse, thus creating a beautiful and moving novel. Nina is the cousin Toni and works in a weaving factory. In addition to facing difficulties in their working day, it is still required to resist the harassment of boss Humberto, husband of the owner of the factory, Silvia. It encourages workers to fight for salary increases and gets to be arrested for leading a general strike.

The issue of land per fight is shown in the plot, through Vincenzo, Adolfo and Farina. They buy the land barons of failed decadent coffee after the crash of the New York Stock Exchange in 1929 and live a close contest with the Frances widow for possession of a farm in São Paulo. The Baroness does not accept that foreigners become landowners in Brazil. Manages its business very tightly, and so it is called by everyone "Francisca Iron Hand". Throughout history, Frances discovers that her late husband had a daughter with a slave. But the biggest surprise is when she discovers that this daughter is Julia, one of the servants of the house. At one point, the farmer gets involved with the Italian Farina, a bad-character shaking that is only interested in his fortune. After being responsible for the admission of Mauritius in a hospice and Beatriz keep in captivity, Farina is killed by the inhabitants of the farm, into a trap that was planned for them all.

A love square is formed in the plot, and are part of Mauritius and Beatriz, Francisca's children, and Caterina and Marcello, children of Vincenzo and Constancia. Their encounter is when Maurice and Beatrice take the initiative to alphabetize all the children of the settlers of the region in which they lived, and among the children of settlers were Caterina and Marcello. At first these novels were disapproved by Francisca. Over time, Mauritius can conquer Catherine and marry her, and the two end up having a son. Have Marcello takes a little longer to win the love of Beatrice.

=== End ===
At the end of the novel, Genaro is murdered by fundamentalists who planned to kill Toni. He dies in his son's arms. Toni and Maria end together next to Martininho, Italy, and rediscover nonna Luiza, who had disappeared. And Camilla takes over the weaving factory, this time, working and acting as a good administrator. In the final scenes of the last chapter, we can see a jump in history to 2000 and shows Toni, Maria and Camilla elderly.

== Cast ==
| Actor | Character |
|---|---|
| Priscila Fantin | Maria |
| Reynaldo Gianecchini | Tony |
| Ana Paula Arósio | Camilla |
| Raul Cortez | Genaro |
| Eva Wilma | Rosa |
| Fernanda Montenegro | Luiza |
| Antônio Fagundes | Giuliano |
| Maria Fernanda Cândido | Nina |
| José Mayer | Martino |
| Laura Cardoso | Madalena |
| Gabriela Duarte | Justine |
| Simone Spoladore | Catarina Maria Tranquili |
| Paulo Goulart | Farina |
| Otávio Augusto | Manolo |
| Othon Bastos | Vincenzo Tranquili |
| Lúcia Veríssimo | Francisca Helena |
| Emílio Orciollo Netto | Marcello Tranquili |
| Regina Maria Dourado | Mariúsa |
| Araci Esteves | Costância |
| Jussara Freire | Amália |
| Giselle Itié | Eulália |
| Cláudio Mendes | Mário |
| Cosme dos Santos | Chiquinho Forró (Alcides) |
| José Augusto Branco | Barão Marcílio de Albuquerque |
| Zé Victor Castiel | Gaetano |
| Oscar Magrini | Umberto |
| Luciana Braga | Adelaide |
| Miriam Freeland | Beatriz Francine de Albuquerque |
| Ranieri Gonzalez | Maurício |
| Eliana Guttman | Tzipora |
| Gilbert Stein | Ezequiel |
| Denise Del Vecchio | Soledad |
| Cláudio Galvan | Bruno |
| Antônio Petrin | Adolfo |
| Tatiana Monteiro | Malu |
| Sheron Menezes | Julia de Silve |
| Mareliz Rodrigues | Isabela |
| Tadeu di Pietro | Delegate Homero |
| Chico Carvalho | Marcos |
| Daniel Lobo | Felipe |
| Mariz | Rafael |
| Nuno Lopes | José Manoel |
| Chica Xavier | Nhá Rita |
| Cláudio Correa e Castro | Agostihno |
| Walmor Chagas | Gioseppe |
| Osmar Prado | Jacobino |
| Jackson Antunes | Zangão |
| Marcos Palmeira | Zequinha |
| Milton Gonçalves | Matias |
| Massimo Ciavarro | Luígi |

=== Supporting cast ===
- Amílton Monteiro as Dr. Paco Valdez
- Ana Lúcia Torre as Gareth Peirce
- Antônio Fragoso as Giovanni Messe
- Antônio Gonzales as Ugo Cavallero
- Beatriz Segall as Antônia
- Camilo Bevilacqua as registrar
- Charles Myara as Arturo Riccardi
- Charles Paraventi as Giuseppe Conlon
- Débora Olivieri as Mira
- Edgard Amorim as Raul
- Eduardo Mancini as Amadeu
- Elias Gleizer as João Alfaiate
- Emiliano Queiróz as Padre Denizard
- Gianfrancesco Guarnieri as Pelegrini
- Gilberto Marmorosch as Genaro friend
- Gracindo Júnior as Miguel
- Ida Gomes as Míriam
- José Augusto Branco as Marcílio
- José Lewgoy as Father Romão
- Júlia Lemmertz as Geovanna Tornatore
- Kenya Costa as Noêmia
- Luís de Lima as Antônio
- Luiz Guilherme as Delegate Silveira
- Mário César Camargo as Giuseppe Tornatore
- Massimo Ciavarro as Luigi
- Milton Warlei as Camilli suitor
- Pietro Mário as Meneguetti
- Plínio Soares as Axel Bauer
- Rennata Bianco as Store lady piano
- Roberto Pirillo as broker
- Samura del Castel as Fiorella
- Xando Graça as Frederico
