= Chica Xavier =

Brazilian actress (1932–2020)

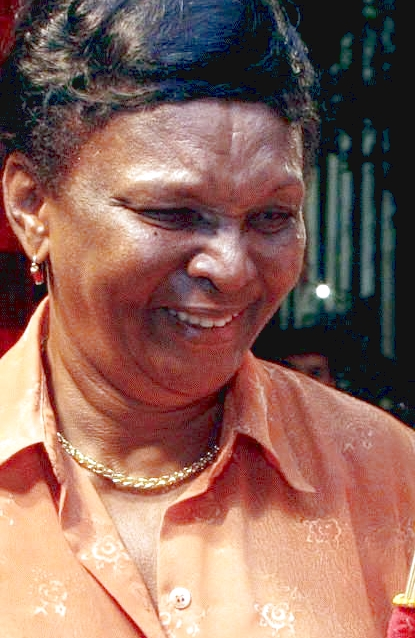
- Xavier in 2010
- Born: Francisca Xavier Queiroz; 22 January 1932; Salvador, Bahia, Brazil
- Died: 8 August 2020 (aged 88); Rio de Janeiro, Brazil
- Occupation: Actress
- Years active: 1953–2012
- Spouse: Clementino Kelé (m. 1956)
- Children: 3

Francisca Xavier Queiroz de Jesus (22 January 1932 – 8 August 2020), known professionally as Chica Xavier, was a Brazilian actress and producer. Xavier worked in stage, film, and television. She was known primarily for her work in Rede Globo's telenovelas, but was active in stage for 60 years. Xavier was born in Salvador, Bahia. She was married to actor Clementino Kelé.

Xavier started working at 14 years as bookbinder at the Official Press of the State of Bahia. She moved to Rio de Janeiro in 1953 and studied theater with Pascoal Carlos Magno. Her theater debut was on September 25, 1956 at the Teatro Municipal. Xavier acted in Orfeu da Conceição alongside Haroldo Costa, Léa Garcia, Cyro Monteiro, Dirce Paiva, Clementino Kelé, among others. Xavier played the role of Dama Negra, which symbolized Death; she recited verses from Vinícius de Moraes and danced to atabaques, or Afro-Brazilian drumming.

Xavier's film debut was in Assalto ao Trem Pagador in 1962, directed by Roberto Farias. She then worked in several Rede Globo productions. In 1973 Xavier debuted on TV in the telenovela Os Ossos do Barão. She played more than 50 characters on television, and was a cast member in Sinhá Moça, Dancin' Days, Renascer, Pátria Minha, Força de um Desejo, and the miniseries Tenda dos Milagres, where she played the mãe-de-santo Magé Bassã.

Xavier published Chica Xavier canta sua prosa: Cantigas, louvações e rezas para os orixás in 1999. The book had a preface by her friend Miguel Falabella, and was illustrated by her daughter Izabela d'Oxóssi. She was the subject of a biography in 2013 by Teresa Montero titled Chica Xavier: Mãe do Brasil. Xavier was born at a Candomblé terreiro, or temple. She was the leader of a Candomblé religious community in Rio de Janeiro, the Cercado de Boiadeiro.

== Filmography ==
Year	Title	Role	Notes
1962	O Assalto ao Trem Pagador	Lino's wife	
1973	Um Virgem na Praça		
1975	Uma Mulata Para Todos		
1979	Lerfá Mú		
1979	A Deusa Negra		
1983	Inocência		
1986	Sinhá Moça	Virgínia	TV series
1988	Fera Radical	Júlia	TV series
1993	Encontros imperfeitos	D. Joana	
1993	Renascer	Inácia	
1996	O Rei do Gado		TV series
1999	Força de um Desejo	Rosália	TV series
2001	A Partilha	Bá Toinha	
2002	Esperança	Nhá Rita	TV series
2004	Um Só Coração	Isolina	TV mini-series
2006	Só Deus Sabe	Mãe de Santo	
2007-2008	Duas Caras	Setembrina	51 episodes
2010	Nosso Lar	Ismália	
2016	Mulheres no Poder	Senadora entrevistada	(final film role)
