= Leonardo Brício =

Brazilian actor (born 1963)

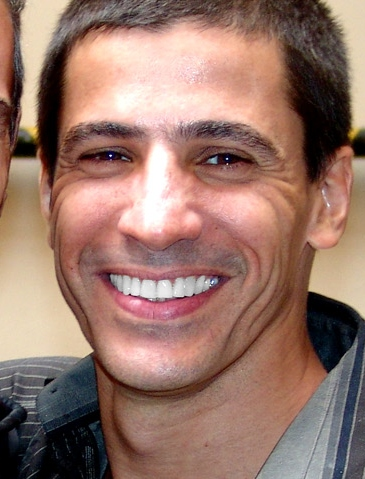
- Brício in 2006
- Born: Leonardo Silva Brício; 7 July 1963 (age 63); Rio de Janeiro, Brazil
- Occupation: actor
- Years active: 1989–present

Leonardo Silva Brício (born 7 July 1963) is a Brazilian actor and theater director.

== Career ==
Brício was born in Rio de Janeiro on 7 July 1963. He began his career in theater in 1984 at Teatro O Tablado under the mentorship of playwright⁣⁣ Maria Clara Machado and made his acting debut on television in 1989 in the series Tieta. Throughout the 1990s, Brício developed an important career in telenovelas like Renascer, Éramos Seis, and O Rei do Gado. In theater, he took place in 2002 in the play O Ateneu.

In 2004, Brício was cast in the highly acclaimed telenovela Da Cor do Pecado and in 2006 in Cidadão Brasileiro. He has also played roles in cinema and in television miniseries, including Chamas da Vida, Rei Davi (where he portrayed the leading role of David), and Arcanjo Renegado.
