= Sinhá Moça (1986 TV series) =

- Genre: Telenovela
- Created by: Benedito Ruy Barbosa
- Based on: Sinhá Moça by Maria Dezonne Pacheco Fernandes
- Directed by: Reynaldo Boury; Jayme Monjardim
- Starring: Lucélia Santos; Marcos Paulo; Rubens de Falco; Elaine Cristina; Raymundo de Souza; Mauro Mendonça; Neuza Amaral; Daniel Dantas; Patrícia Pillar; Luiz Carlos Arutin; Luciana Braga; Sérgio Viotti; Chica Xavier; José Augusto Branco; Norma Blum
- Opening theme: "Pra Não Mais Voltar"
- Composer: Fafá de Belém
- Country of origin: Brazil
- Original language: Portuguese
- No. of episodes: 168

Original release
- Network: TV Globo
- Release: 28 April – 14 November 1986

Related
- De Quina pra Lua; Direito de Amar

Sinhá Moça (Little Missy) is a Brazilian telenovela produced and broadcast in the 6:00 PM timeslot by TV Globo, from 28 April to 14 November 1986, in 168 episodes. It substituted De Quina pra Lua and was succeeded by Direito de Amar.

Written by Benedito Ruy Barbosa, it is freely inspired by the novel of the same name by Maria Dezonne Pacheco Fernandes, with the collaboration of Edmara Barbosa and Edilene Barbosa and direction of Reynaldo Boury and Jayme Monjardim.

== Synopsis ==
The story revolves around Sinhá Moça (Lucélia Santos), the rebellious daughter of Colonel Ferreira, the baron of Araruna (Rubens de Falco), who is a ruthless slaveowner, her submissive mother Cândida (Elaine Cristina), and the young Dr. Rodolfo Garcia Fontes (Marcos Paulo), an active Republican abolitionist, before the difficulties of the campaign for the abolition of slavery.

Pro-slavery Monarchists and anti-slavery Republicans confront themselves in Araruna, a small fictional town in the interior of the state of São Paulo, in 1886, two years before the promulgation of the Lei Áurea ("Golden Law"), that abolished slavery nationwide in Brazil.

The two meet on the train, when Sinhá Moça, after finishing her studies in the city of São Paulo, returns to Araruna. Like Rodolfo, she has abolitionist ideas and criticizes her father's attitudes, fighting for abolition. Sinhá Moça, along with Rodolfo and other abolitionists, invades slave quarters at night, freeing the black slaves and giving them to abolitionist associations, which guide them towards freedom.

On the other side of the story is Dimas (Raymundo de Souza) (who is actually the boy Rafael, ex-freed slave) and his stubborn struggle to destroy the Baron, his true father with the slave of the farm Maria das Dores (Dhu Moraes). Before being sold by the Baron, Rafael was a close friend of Sinhá Moça, with whom he spent his childhood. After being emancipated, he takes the name Dimas and becomes the right hand of the typographer Augusto (Luiz Carlos Arutin), a convicted abolitionist, arousing love in Juliana (Luciana Braga), his granddaughter.

== Cast ==
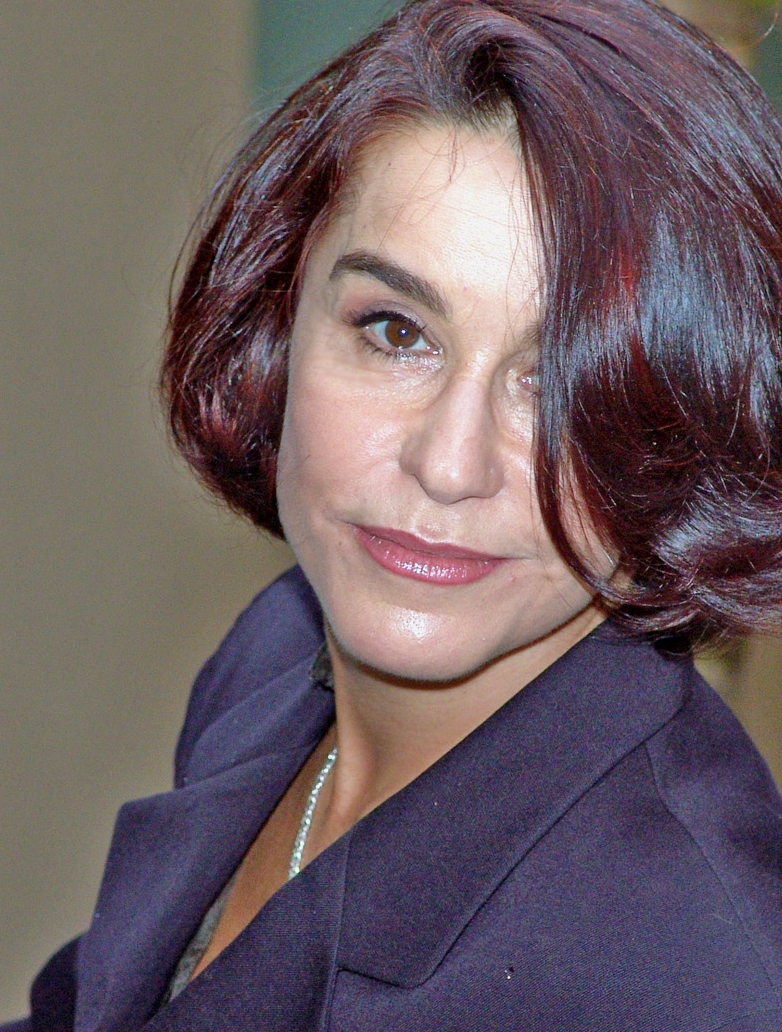
Lucélia Santos

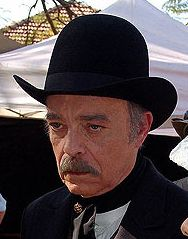
Rubens de Falco

Actor / Actress	Character
Lucélia Santos	Sinhá Moça (Maria das Graças Ferreira Fontes)
Marcos Paulo	Rodolfo Garcia Fontes
Rubens de Falco	Barão de Araruna (Coronel Ferreira)
Elaine Cristina	Baronesa Cândida Ferreira
Raymundo de Souza	Dimas / Rafael
Mauro Mendonça	Dr. Fontes
Neuza Amaral	Inês Garcia Fontes
Daniel Dantas	Ricardo Garcia Fontes
Patrícia Pillar	Ana do Véu (Ana Luísa Teixeira)
Luiz Carlos Arutin	Augusto
Luciana Braga	Juliana
Sérgio Viotti	Frei José
Chica Xavier	Bá (Virgínia)
José Augusto Branco	Manoel Teixeira
Norma Blum	Nina Teixeira
Valter Santos	Feitor Bruno
Tony Tornado	Justo Filho (Mato Captain)
Grande Otelo	Justo
Cosme dos Santos	Sebastião (Bastião)
Solange Couto	Adelaide de Coutinho
Tato Gabus Mendes	José Coutinho
Antônio Pompeo	Justino
Gésio Amadeu	Fulgêncio
José Prata	Bentinho
Jacyra Sampaio	Rute
Cláudio Mamberti	Delegate Antero
Tarcísio Filho	Mário
Augusto Olímpio	Bobó
Henri Pagnoncelli	Eduardo
Fernando José	Martinho
Ivan Mesquita	Coutinho
Germano Filho	Everaldo
Dênis Derkian	Renato
Nizo Neto	Nino
Renato Prieto	Vila
Athayde Arcoverde	Robusto
Newton Martins	Viriato
Alciro Cunha	Nogueira
Aguinaldo Rocha	Dom Marcílio Pedrosa
Antônio Francisco	Honório
Joel Silva	Tobias
Christovam Netto	Tobias

=== Special participation ===
Actor / Actress	Character
Milton Gonçalves	Father José
Dhu Moraes	Maria das Dores
Lizandra Souto	Sinhá Moça (child)
Selton Mello	Rafael (child)
Ruth de Souza	Balbina
Cláudio Corrêa e Castro	Dr. João Amorim
Ênio Santos	Inácio
Cláudio McDowell	Tibúrcio
Aldo César	Petrúcio
Aldo Bueno	Pedro
Canarinho	Francisco
Paulo Nunes	Olivério
Zeni Pereira	Mãe Maria
Fernando Almeida	Dr. Geraldo
Jorge Cherques	Priest Cesário
Romeu Evaristo	Paulino
