= Três Graças =

Brazilian telenovela

- Genre: Telenovela
- Created by: Aguinaldo Silva; Virgílio Silva; Zé Dassilva
- Written by: Aguinaldo Silva; Virgílio Silva; Zé Dassilva; Patrícia Moretzsohn; Marcia Prates; Eliane Garcia; Cláudia Gomes
- Directed by: Luiz Henrique Rios
- Starring: Sophie Charlotte; Dira Paes; Alana Cabral; Grazi Massafera; Murilo Benício; Romulo Estrela; Arlete Salles; Marcos Palmeira
- Theme music composer: Serginho Meriti; Rodrigo Leite
- Opening theme: "Clareou" by Thiaguinho ft. Negra Li
- Country of origin: Brazil
- Original language: Portuguese
- No. of seasons: 1
- No. of episodes: 179

Production
- Producers: Gustavo Rebelo; Silvana Feu
- Production company: Estúdios Globo

Original release
- Network: TV Globo
- Release: 20 October 2025 – 15 May 2026

Três Graças (lit. 'Three Graces') is a Brazilian telenovela created by Aguinaldo Silva, Virgílio Silva and Zé Dassilva. It aired on TV Globo from 20 October 2025 to 15 May 2026. The telenovela stars Sophie Charlotte, Dira Paes, Alana Cabral, Grazi Massafera, Murilo Benício, Romulo Estrela, Arlete Salles and Marcos Palmeira.

== Plot ==
Gerluce, Lígia, and Joélly are three women from different generations of the same family whose lives are marked by a common factor: they all faced teenage pregnancy and were abandoned by their respective partners. Residents of the Chacrinha slum in São Paulo, Gerluce was raised by her mother after being abandoned by her father, Joaquim, and in her youth, she faced the same fate with the arrival of Joélly at a time when she was preparing to enter college. Determined and hardworking, Gerluce lives an intense routine, which boils down to work, caring for her sick mother, and protecting her daughter, where her main goal is to provide a different life and a promising future for her. However, when Joélly gets pregnant at an early age, Gerluce will do everything she can to prevent her daughter from giving up her dreams and ambitions, just as she and her mother were forced to do. In addition, Gerluce also faces romantic conflicts, such as her breakup with Gilmar, a married man who cheated on her, and the advances of Bagdá, a powerful drug dealer in the community who is in love with her.

Gerluce sees her life take an unexpected turn when she discovers that the medications used by Lígia, provided by the Social Pharmacy, may be ineffective or counterfeit. Ligia takes her medications strictly, but her health only worsens, and a routine exam reveals no trace of the substances in her blood. Outraged, Gerluce and her best friend, pharmacist Viviane, start their own investigation and come across a possible fraud scheme led by Arminda, Gerluce's boss, and her ally and lover, Santiago Ferette, an influential businessman and politician. Cruel and corrupt, Ferette has built a public image as a defender of the vulnerable. At the helm of the Ferette Foundation an organization that receives public funds to purchase and distribute high-cost medicines to the needy population, he poses as a benefactor and example of social responsibility. However, he operates a criminal and highly lucrative drug counterfeiting scheme, endangering the health of thousands of people while enriching himself at the expense of others' suffering. Arminda, on the other hand, is an elegant, wealthy, and seemingly refined woman who, behind her good manners, hides her true nature: cruel, perverse, authoritarian, arrogant, and utterly devoid of empathy.

The situation is complicated when Gerluce and Viviane realize that, without solid proof, any accusation could be fatal. Even so, Gerluce is determined: she won't rest until she protects her mom and everyone in the community. Upon finding a large sum of money hidden in a statue in Arminda's mansion, Gerluce finds herself at an ethical crossroads, where her deep sense of justice conflicts with the illegal paths that appear as tempting shortcuts in the face of the difficulties she faces. Torn between protecting her family, fighting for dignity, and not repeating the mistakes of the past, she must decide how far she is willing to go, and what she is willing to sacrifice, to keep her values intact amid the harshness of reality.

== Cast ==
- Sophie Charlotte as Gerluce Maria das Graças
- Dira Paes as Lígia Maria das Graças
- Alana Cabral as Joélly Maria das Graças
- Grazi Massafera as Arminda Melo Dantas
- Murilo Benício as Santiago Ferette
- Romulo Estrela as Paulo Reitz "Paulinho"
- Marcos Palmeira as Joaquim Monteiro
- Andréia Horta as Zenilda Ferette
- Arlete Salles as Josefa Melo Dantas
- Eduardo Moscovis as Rogério Melo Dantas
- Paulo Mendes as Raul Melo Dantas
- Fernanda Vasconcellos as Samira Veiga
- Miguel Falabella as Kasper Damatta
- Samuel de Assis as João Rubens Damatta
- Daphne Bozaski as Lucélia Damatta "Lucy"
- Pedro Novaes as Leonardo Ferette "Léo"
- Belo as Misael dos Santos
- Gabriela Loran as Viviane Fonseca "Vivi"
- Alanis Guillen as Lorena Ferette
- Gabriela Medvedovsky as Eduarda Fragoso "Juquinha"
- Leandro Lima as Herculano Gomide
- Barbara Reis as Helena Gomide "Lena"
- Carla Marins as Xênica Santana
- Juliana Alves as Alaíde Ramos Gonzaga
- Augusto Madeira as Rivaldo Gonzaga
- Juliano Cazarré as Jorge Garcia "Jorginho Ninja"
- Xamã as José Raimundo Barbosa "Bagdá"
- Amaury Lorenzo as Gilmar Almeida
- Enrique Díaz as Pastor Albérico Dias
- Túlio Starling as Dr. José Maria Santana "Zé Maria"
- André Mattos as Delegado Jairo Barroso
- Otávio Müller as Célio Ramos
- Rejane Faria as Francisca Ramos "Chica"
- Mell Muzzillo as Maggye Damatta
- Guthierry Sotero as Albano Souza Júnior
- Marcello Escorel as Vicente
- Rodrigo García as Macedo
- Júlio Rocha as Edilberto dos Reis
- Pedro Ogata as Luciano
- Vinicius Teixeira as Vandilson
- Lucas Righi as Alemão
- Luiza Rosa as Kellen Cristina Dias
- Lana Guelero as Ivete
- Glaura Lacerda as Gisleyne
- Lorrana Moussinho as Cláudia
- Vinicius Soares as Laerte
- Bruna Franklinn as Lúcia
- Davi Luis Flores as Cristiano Gonzaga
- Viviane Araújo as Consuelo
- Marcelo Serrado as Crodoaldo Valério
- Paulo Betti as Téo Pereira
- Regiane Alves as Violeta Fragoso
- Cláudio Gabriel as Henrique Fragoso
- Ana Beatriz Nogueira as Judge Nara
- Leopoldo Pacheco as Prosecutor Leonel

== Production ==
After the below-expectations performance of his last telenovela, O Sétimo Guardião, which faced several controversies in its production and broadcast, in addition to being a major failure in terms of audience ratings and receiving negative reviews from the public and specialized media, Aguinaldo Silva was dismissed from TV Globo in January 2020, after forty years of working with the network. Initially, it was reported in the press that Silva had submitted the synopsis for Três Graças to the network's television drama department before his departure, but the synopsis was actually presented to the network by his agent and producer, Guto Colunga, executive director of Diosual Entretenimento, a content production and project distribution company that Silva has been a part of since 2020.

In July 2024, during an interview with Veja magazine, Silva denied the news published in February of that year by Folha de S.Paulo's F5 portal, which claimed that TV Globo had given up on producing a new telenovela he had left at the network, referring to Três Graças. The author reaffirmed that this version was not true and clarified that the synopsis had reached the broadcaster through his agent and had not been written while he was still under contract. In October, the synopsis was approved by the television drama department, and Silva negotiated a new contract with TV Globo, which would mark his return to the channel after four years, where the script was also negotiated between the broadcaster and Diosual Entretenimento.

According to Silva, in an interview with O Globo newspaper, the synopsis for Três Graças was originally conceived as a miniseries, where the main plot would focus on the theft of a safe, but he saw the potential to turn it into a telenovela. In the same interview, Silva stated that the inspiration for the main plot of the three protagonists, who all experienced teenage pregnancy, came during field research conducted at the Leila Diniz Maternity Hospital in Barra da Tijuca, Rio de Janeiro, where he said he was deeply impacted by seeing a line of pregnant teenagers, many under the age of 18.

Initially, Três Graças was to be set in Rio de Janeiro, a recurring setting in Silva's previous works, and part of the telenovela was to be set in the fictional community of Portelinha, one of the main settings of Duas Caras. However, with the aim of winning back the São Paulo audience, which in recent years has lost interest in the 9:00 p.m. telenovelas, the network decided to move the setting of the telenovela to São Paulo, where the fictional community of Chacrinha was created especially to serve as the backdrop for the telenovela.

Virgílio Silva was selected as scriptwriter after previously working with the Aguinaldo Silva on O Sétimo Guardião, where he collaborated on the script for the first 30 episodes of the telenovela, while Patrícia Moretzsohn, Marcia Prates, Eliane Garcia, and Zé Dassilva subsequently joined the team, with Prates, Garcia, and Dassilva bringing recent experience from Mania de Você. Luiz Henrique Rios serves as director of the telenovela. Filming began on 7 July 2025. The locations chosen in São Paulo were the Brasilândia neighborhood in the northern part of the city, where the fictional community of Chacrinha is located, the Bandeira Terminal in the central part of the city, and the EZ Tower in the Chácara Santo Antônio neighborhood in the southern part of São Paulo.

Três Graças was scheduled to premiere in the first quarter of 2026, replacing Rosa dos Ventos, created by Gloria Perez, which was originally supposed to replace Vale Tudo. However, on 10 February 2025, TV Globo decided to postpone Perez's telenovela and reverse the order with Três Graças, which was moved up to October 2025 and confirmed as the successor to Vale Tudo. Ultimately, Perez's telenovela would end up being canceled for addressing sensitive topics such as abortion and corruption. In the case of the latter, the network chose to avoid political topics due to the 2026 election period. Regarding the first topic, it did not comply with the network's new standards of conduct.

Initially planned to have 197 episodes, the telenovela ended up being shortened to 179. Globo's reasoning behind this decision is to avoid potential viewer fatigue with longer telenovelas in order to adapt to current audience preferences, which have prioritized shorter productions in recent years. Another factor was to prevent its replacement, Quem Ama Cuida, created by Walcyr Carrasco, from premiering during the first week of the 2026 FIFA World Cup, as many matches would be broadcast at night.

== Ratings ==
Season	Episodes	First aired		Last aired		Avg. viewers (points)
Season	Episodes	Date	Viewers (points)	Date	Viewers (points)	Avg. viewers (points)
1	179	20 October 2025	23.8	15 May 2026	27.6	22.6
