= Arcanjo Renegado =

Brazilian television series

- Genre: Action drama; Crime; Drama
- Created by: Adriana Falcão; Jô Abdu; Martha Mendonça; Nelito Fernandes
- Written by: Bárbara Velloso; Debora Guimarães; Gabriel Maria; Gustavo Rademacher; José Luiz Magalhães; Rafael Spínola
- Directed by: Heitor Dhalia; André Godói
- Starring: Marcello Melo Jr.; Álamo Facó; Flávio Bauraqui; Erika Januza; Leonardo Brício; Rita Guedes; Bruno Padilha
- Country of origin: Brazil
- Original language: Portuguese
- No. of seasons: 4
- No. of episodes: 40

Production
- Cinematography: Pepe Mendes
- Production companies: Estúdios Globo; AfroReggae Audiovisual; Hungry Man

Original release
- Network: Globoplay
- Release: 7 February 2020 – present

Arcanjo Renegado (English: Dissident Archangel) is a Brazilian television series that was released on Globoplay on 7 February 2020. It stars Marcelo Mello Jr., Álamo Facó, Flávio Bauraqui, Erika Januza, Leonardo Brício, Rita Guedes, and Bruno Padilha.

On 18 February 2020, the series was renewed for a second season that premiered on 25 August 2022. The third season premiered on 14 November 2024.

== Premise ==
According to the angelic hierarchy, Mikhael (Marcello Melo Jr.) is the prince of the archangels. His name, invoked to represent courage, strong defense and divine protection, resounds like a battle cry. Mikhael is the name of the first sergeant of the Special Police Operations Battalion (BOPE). Mikhael is the only soldier who leads a team in BOPE and is considered the best trained, effective and lethal of the battalion, respected within the corporation and feared by bandits. When one of his friends is injured in an operation, he seeks revenge and ends up in conflict with the main political leaders of the state.

== Cast ==
=== Main ===
- Marcello Melo Jr. as Mikhael Afonso
- Álamo Facó as Ronaldo Leitão
- Flávio Bauraqui as Barata
- Erika Januza as Sarah
- Leonardo Brício as Coronel Gabriel
- Rita Guedes as Manuela Berengher
- Bruno Padilha as Custódio Marques
- Ademir Emboava as Augusto Savassi
- Alex Nader as Sargento Rafael
- Rogério Casanova as José Nogueira "Chucky"
- Gabriela Loran as Giovana

=== Recurring ===
- Luciana Bezerra as Jurema
- Renato Régis as Wagner
- Roosevelt Luiz as Galvão
- Robson Galvão as Ivan
- Ivan Blaz as Major Pedro
- Sérgio Dantas as Jocas
- Danni Suzuki as Capitã Luciana Mayumi
- Guti Fraga as Luís Eustáquio
- Léa Garcia as Dona Laura
- Tatsu Carvalho as Antônio Faustini
- Bruno Mazzeo as Joel Fontura

== Awards and nominations ==
| Year | Award | Category | Nominated | Result |
|---|---|---|---|---|
| 2020 | Prêmio APCA de Televisão | Best Actor | Marcello Melo Jr. | Nominated |
