= Tarcísio Filho =

Brazilian actor (born 1964)

- Tarcísio Filho in 2022
- Born: Tarcísio Pereira de Magalhães Filho; August 22, 1964 (age 62); São Paulo, Brazil
- Occupation: Actor
- Spouse: Mocita Fagundes (m. 2010)
- Parents: Tarcísio Meira (father); Gloria Menezes (mother)

Tarcísio Pereira de Magalhães Filho, usually known as Tarcísio Filho (born August 22, 1964]) is a Brazilian actor.

== Biography ==
He is the son of the actors Glória Menezes and Tarcísio Meira. He has two half brothers, sons from a previous marriage of Glória Menezes.

== Personal life ==
Tarcísio is married to publicist Mocita Fagundes.

== Career ==
=== Television ===
Year	Title	Role
1980	Coração Alado	Carlinhos
1984	Caso Verdade	Arturo Riccardi
1985	Antônio Maria	Gustavo
1986	Dona Beija	Pedro I of Brazil
1986	Sinhá Moça	Mário
1987	Brega & Chique	Teddy (Teobaldo Alvaray)
1988	Sassaricando	Carlos Ronaldo
1988	Bebê a Bordo	Caco (Carlos Antônio)
1989	O Salvador da Pátria	Otávio
1989	Kananga do Japão	Júlio
1990	Escrava Anastácia	Feitor Arcanjo Fluentes
1990	Pantanal	Marcelo
1991	Floradas na Serra	Dr. Celso
1991	O Fantasma da Ópera	José Carlos Ribeiro
1992	Você Decide	(episode: "Coração na Mão")
1993	Renascer	Zé Bento
1994	Éramos Seis	Alfredo
1995	Sangue do Meu Sangue	Lúcio Rezende
1997	Os Ossos do Barão	Martino
1998	Serras Azuis	Barão de Serras Azuis (young)
1998	Teleteatro	
1999	Suave Veneno	Augusto Ivan
2000	Terra Nostra	Vígaro Gabriel
2001	Estrela-Guia	Mauro Lima
2001	Um Anjo Caiu do Céu	Capitão Rodrigo
2003	A Casa das Sete Mulheres	General Neto
2003	Retrato Falado	Gianni Gasparinetti (episode: "O Primeiro Beijo da TV")
2003	Chocolate com Pimenta	Sebastian von Burgo
2004	Senhora do Destino	José Carlos Tedesco (young)
2004	Começar de Novo	Estevão Cidreira
2005	Linha Direta	Joseph Mengele (episode: "Caso Mengele")
2007	Amazônia, de Galvez a Chico Mendes	Orlando Lopes
2007	Carga Pesada	Jonas (episode: "Marcas Profunda")
2008	Queridos Amigos	Rui
2008	Dicas de um Sedutor	Frederico Guilherme Gouvêa (episode: "Golpe do Baú")
2008	Casos e Acasos	Marcondes (episode: "O Trote, o Filho e o Fora")
2008	Casos e Acasos	Marcos (episode: "O Colchão, a Mala e a Balada")
2008	Casos e Acasos	Wagner (episode: "A Aliança, a Queixa e a Revista")
2009	Malhação ID	Paulo Roberto Oliveira
2011	Morde & Assopra	Delegate Pimentel
2013	Sangue Bom	Nelson
2014	Doce de Mãe	Alberto
2014	Eu Que Amo Tanto	Miguel (episode: "Sandra")
2015	Verdades Secretas	Rogério Gomes
2016	Êta Mundo Bom!	Severo Lima
2017	Segredos de Justiça	Andréa's Friend (episode: "Quem Cuida Dele?")
2018	Deus Salve o Rei	Demétrio
2019	Verão 90	Alexander Hall, Duque de Kiev
2021	Passport to Freedom	Joaquim Antônio de Souza Ribeiro

=== Films ===
Year	Title	Role
1972	Independência ou Morte	Pedro I of Brazil (child)
1990	Boca de Ouro	
1996	Contos de Lygia e Morte	
2003	Por Um Fio	Nando
2004	O Rolex de Ouro	
2005	Sequestro Relâmpago	
2005	Me Apaixonei	
2005	Cerro do Jarau	Bento
2006	No Meio da Rua	Otávio
2008	Alucinados	
2008	Netto e o Domador de Cavalos	Índio Torres
