= Dedé Mamata =

1988 film directed by Rodolfo Brandão

- Directed by: Rodolfo Brandão
- Written by: Antônio Calmon; Vinícius Vianna
- Based on: a novel by Vinícius Vianna
- Produced by: Carlos Diegues; Paulo César Ferreira
- Starring: Guilherme Fontes
- Cinematography: José Tadeu Ribeiro
- Edited by: Marta Luz
- Release date: 1987
- Language: Portuguese

Dedé Mamata is a 1987 Brazilian drama film directed by Rodolfo Brandão and starring Guilherme Fontes.

The film was entered into the main competition at the 45th edition of the Venice Film Festival. It also won the awards for Best Supporting Actor (Marcos Palmeira) and Best Supporting Actress (Iara Jamra) at the 1988 Gramado Film Festival.

== Cast ==
- Guilherme Fontes as Dedé Mamata
- Malu Mader as Lena
- Marcos Palmeira as Alpino
- Luiz Fernando Guimarães as Cumpade
- Paulo Porto as Avô
- Iara Jamra as Ritinha
- Paulo Betti as Pai
- Nathalia Timberg as Avó
- Geraldo Del Rey as Carlos Marighella
- Tonico Pereira as Dirigente comunista
- Thaís de Campos as Young Avó
- Antônio Pitanga as Policial
- Thelma Reston as Mãe de Lena
