= Marcello Melo Jr. =

Brazilian actor and singer (born 1987)

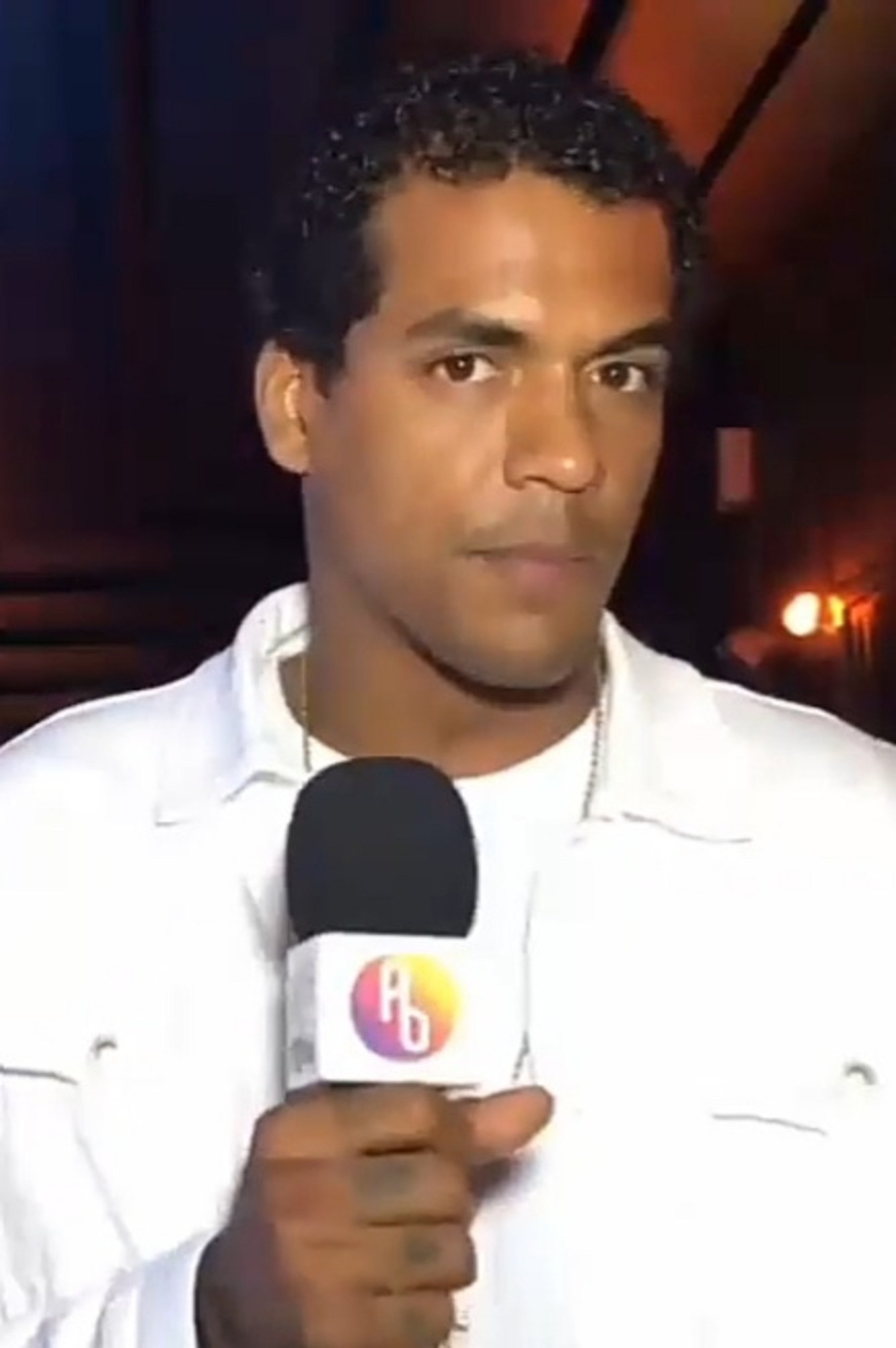
- Melo in 2020
- Born: Marcelo Santos de Melo Júnior; 19 November 1987 (age 38); Nova Iguaçu, Rio de Janeiro, Brazil
- Occupations: Actor, singer, songwriter, model
- Years active: 2002–present
- Musical career

Marcelo Santos de Melo Júnior (born 19 November 1987) is a Brazilian actor, singer-songwriter, and model.

== Biography ==
Marcelo Melo Jr. was born in Nova Iguaçu, in the Baixada Fluminense, Rio de Janeiro, and grew up in the Vidigal slum, South Zone of Rio de Janeiro.

In an interview for the magazine "Quem" in 2012: "I came to live with my father in Vidigal to 7 years and saw the first show, in which he was part of the cast, and fell in love It is my first idol My childhood there. was really fun, I bucked kite was very kid, did theater, I had a lot of happiness and at the same time learning the responsibilities".

== Career ==
Formed by the theater group "Nós do Morro", which is part since 1997. Marcello is also a singer, musician and composer of hip hop band, "Melanina Carioca".

In film, participated in the most successful productions of the resumption of Brazilian cinema as "Cidade de Deus" by Fernando Meirelles and "Última Parada 174", Bruno Barreto.

In theater he participated in numerous assemblies Group "Nós do Morro", among them prominently in "Os Dois Cavaleiros de Verona" directed by Guti Fraga. He worked on TV in the novels "Viver a Vida" worked on "A Lei e o Crime" directed by Alexandre Avancini, Rede Record series, and the same year was to Globo. In 2010, he joined the cast of the youth novel "Workout" with Maicon character.

Marcello joined the cast of the series "caRIOcas", which would be the first Brazilian gay series, but it was canceled. But some scenes were eventually released on the internet and YouTube.

The following year, he joined the cast of the six o'clock novela, "A Vida da Gente". Soon in 2012, he appeared in another six o'clock novela, "Lado a Lado", as Reed.

In 2014, he was cast in the soap opera of the nine, "Em Família", as the violent villain Jairo. And as early as July 27, 2014, the actor was announced in the cast of "Babilônia", scheduled to open after Carnival 2015. "Marcello's character is a physical education teacher, humorous, and has nothing to do with the marginality", said Ricardo Linhares, co-author of "Babilônia", next to Gilberto Braga and John Ximenes Braga. In November of that same year he was champion of the "Dança dos Famosos" framework.

In 2015, the actor became part of the cast of the new nine o'clock novela on Rede Globo, "Babilônia", playing "Ivan", a teacher of slackline.

== Coleção Mjr. ==
Marcello Melo Jr. launches its own line of caps and shirts, in partnership with "Uniti Rio", the "Coleção Mjr." ("Collection Mjr.") The launch took place on August 28, 2014, in the "Top Fashion Bazar", in Barra da Tijuca in Rio de Janeiro.

== Filmography ==
Television
Year	Title	Role
2006–07	Prova de Amor	Ernesto
2006	Linha Direta Justiça	Soldier Nelson Cunha
2006–07	Vidas Opostas	Tato
2007–08	Amor e Intrigas	Sérgio
2009	A Lei e o Crime	Zica
2009–10	Viver a Vida	Benedito Sampaio (Benê)
2010–11	Malhação	Maicon
2011	Tijuca Querida	Muralha
2011–12	A Vida da Gente	Mathias
2012–13	Lado a Lado	Caniço
2013	Sangue Bom	Carlos
2014	Em Família	Jairo
2014	Dança dos Famosos	Himself/ winner
2015	Babilônia	Ivan
2020–present	Arcanjo Renegado	Mikhael Afonso
2020	Salve-se Quem Puder	Himself
2024	Renascer	José Bento Inocêncio
2025	Dona de Mim	Costa

Film
Year	Title	Role
2002	Cidade de Deus	Pulguinha
Marquinhos
2008	Última Parada 174	Alesandro
2010	5x Favela – Agora por Nós Mesmos	Alex
2011	Desenrola	Hugo
2012	Cidade de Deus - 10 Anos Depois	Himself
2013	Mato sem Cachorro	Elson
2014	Alemão	Carlinhos
2018	Canastra Suja	Tutu

Web/ Internet
Year	Title	Role	Note
2015	Ta Fazendo o Que?	Himself	"Sketch comedy"
2015	Vamos Melaninar o Mundo	Himself	"Mini-documentary" Melanina Carioca group

== Discography ==
- Melanina Carioca (Marcello Melo Jr. is part of the hip hop group with seven members, including the actor Jonathan Haagensen and Roberta Rodrigues actress.)

== Awards and nominations ==
Year	Award	Category	Work	Result
2009	Troféu Raça Negra	Best Actor	Benê on Viver a Vida	Won
2010	Troféu Raça Negra	Best Actor	Maicon on Malhação	Won
