= Gabriela Duarte =

Brazilian actress

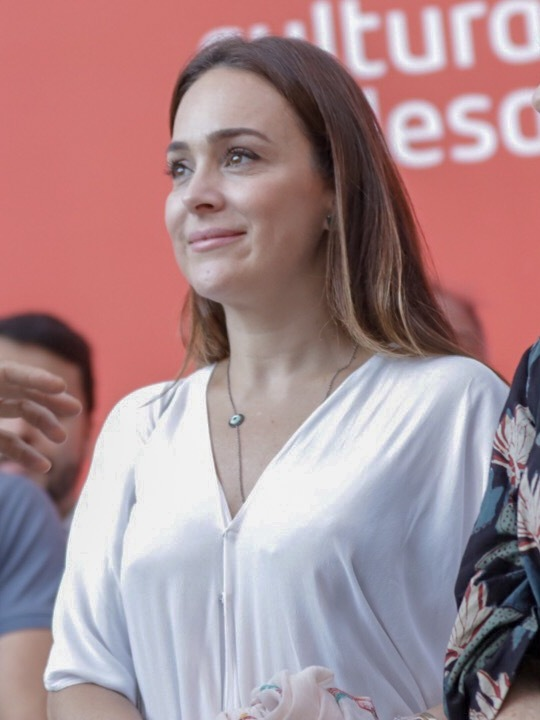
- Duarte in 2019
- Born: Gabriela Duarte Franco; 15 April 1974 (age 52); Campinas, São Paulo, Brazil
- Other name: Gabidu
- Occupation: Actress
- Years active: 1983–present
- Spouse: Jairo Goldflus (m. 2002; div. 2022)
- Children: 2
- Mother: Regina Duarte

Gabriela Duarte Franco (born 15 April 1974) is a Brazilian actress. She is also the daughter of actress Regina Duarte.

== Biography ==
She is the daughter of actress Regina Duarte and businessman Marcos Flávio Cunha Franco.

== Career ==
Her first work was the film O Cangaceiro Trapalhão, from 1983. She worked in the film O Vestido, which won her the award for Best Actress at the Festival de Cinema Ibero-Americano de Huelva.

She debuted on television in 1989, the miniseries Colônia Cecília. After being part of Top Model, her first soap opera, she participated in the remake of Irmãos Coragem, in 1995 in which she played the character played by her mother Regina Duarte on the first version. A year later, she participated in two episodes of the series A Vida Como Ela É, based on the work of Nelson Rodrigues.

In 1997, she gained widespread visibility in the soap opera Por Amor, where she played Maria Eduarda, a character who has generated controversy. Many disliked her interpretation, and was even created a website in the spirit "I hate Eduarda".

In the miniseries Chiquinha Gonzaga in 1999, she played the composer as a young woman and her mother, Regina Duarte, played the same character at maturity. After a brief hiatus in her career, consisting only made investments in soap operas and series, in 2005 in América acts in the role of Simone, a veterinarian who engages with the protagonist of the story.

In 2007, operates in Sete Pecados, which gets some recognition of the public with the character Miriam, a public school principal who struggles against racial and social prejudices and believes in the improvement of public education.

In 2008, the actress makes an appearance on the show Casos e Acasos (Globo). The following year, participates in the microarray Acampamento de Férias, Renato Aragão, displayed by Rede Globo.

After three years of small roles in serials, soap operas back in Passione, the role of Jessica, a "new rich" spoiled, jealous and nymphomaniac. Considered by actress a "turning point" in her career, such a character received critical acclaim and the public, where also the second actress leaves the stigma of her character in For Love and ceases to be compared with her mother Regina.

In 2011, she participated in a new framework of the Fantástico, made especially for Father's Day, É Pai, É Pedra, playing Mônica on 4 episodes. In 2013, returns to cinema with comedy Mato sem Cachorro and will make a cameo on the soap opera Amor à Vida of Walcyr Carrasco.

In 2016, participated in the first phase of the novel A Lei do Amor, interpreting the mysterious Suzana when young and its mother, Regina, represented the same personage in the second phase of the plot. In 2018, Gabriela is cast for the cast of the novel Orgulho e Paixão, in the pamphlet the actress will play the villain Julieta, who is known as the Queen of the Coffee.

== Personal life ==
Gabriela was married to photographer Jairo Goldflus, from whom she separated in January 2022. From the union, the actress has 2 children: Manuela, born on August 18, 2006, and Frederico, born on December 17, 2011.

The actress regularly participates in social and humanitarian causes, such as donating coats, fighting animal cancer, and donating blood.

In October 2023, Gabriela announced through social media her relationship with athlete and businessman Fernando Frewka.

== Filmography ==
=== Television ===
Year	Title	Role	Notes
1989	Colônia Cecília	Bianca Rivas	
1989	Top Model	Olívia Kundera	
1990	Delegacia de Mulheres	Fátima	Episode: "Nossa Senhora dos Oprimidos"
1995	Irmãos Coragem	Rita de Cássia Maciel	
1996	A Vida Como Ela É	daughter Aderbal and Clara	Episode: "O Decote"
1996	A Vida Como Ela É	Alicinha (Alice de Almeida Santos)	Episode: "O Anjo"
1997	Por Amor	Maria Eduarda Viana Greco de Barros Mota	
1999	Chiquinha Gonzaga	Francisca Edwiges Neves Gonzaga (young)	Phase 1
1999	Você Decide	Luiza	Episode: "Marido Ciumento"
2002	Brava Gente	Gisela	Episode: "A Hora Errada"
2002	Esperança	Justine	
2003	Kubanacan	Veruska Verón	Episodes: "October 22–25, 2003"
2004	Sob Nova Direção	Mari	Episode: "Simpatia é Quase Horror"
2005	América	Simone Garcia Menezes	
2007	Sete Pecados	Míriam de Freitas	
2008	Dicas de um Sedutor	Maria	Episode: "Quem Perde, Ganha!"
2008	Casos e Acasos	Carol	Episode: "O Ex, a Promoção e o Vizinho"
2008	Casos e Acasos	Karla	Episode: "A Aliança, a Queixa e a Revista"
2009	Acampamento de Férias	Júlia	Season 1
2009	A Turma do Didi	Herself	Episodes: "June 28, 2009"
2010	Passione	Jéssica da Silva Rondelli	
2011	É Pai, É Pedra	Mônica	
2013	Amor à Vida	Luana Sousa Araújo	Episode: "May 20, 2013"
2013	Junto & Misturado	Various characters	Season 2
2014	Amor Veríssimo	Various characters	
2016	A Lei do Amor	Suzana Rivera (young)	Episodes: "October 4–7, 2016"
2018	Orgulho e Paixão	Julieta Bittencourt (Queen of the Coffee)	

=== Films ===
Year	Title	Role
1983	O Cangaceiro Trapalhão	
2000	Oriundi	Patty
2001	Pedro Pintor em Auto Retrato	
2003	O Vestido	Bárbara
2006	O Caso Morel	
2013	Mato sem Cachorro	Mariana
2015	Ninguém Ama Ninguém... Por Mais de Dois Anos	Elvira

=== Stage ===
Year	Title	Role	Notes
1991	Namoro – No Escurinho do Teatro...	Simone	
1994	Confissões de Adolescente	Teenager	1994–1995
1999	Honour	Sofia	1999–2001
2003	Pedro e Vanda	Vanda	
2004	Os Direitos da Criança	Gabriela Lee	
2006	As Mulheres da Minha Vida	Júlia	
2012	A Garota do Adeus	Paula	2012–2013
2014	Através de um Espelho	Karin	2014–2015
2019	Perfume de Mulher	Sara	
