= Vanessa Lóes =

Brazilian film and television actress (born 1971)

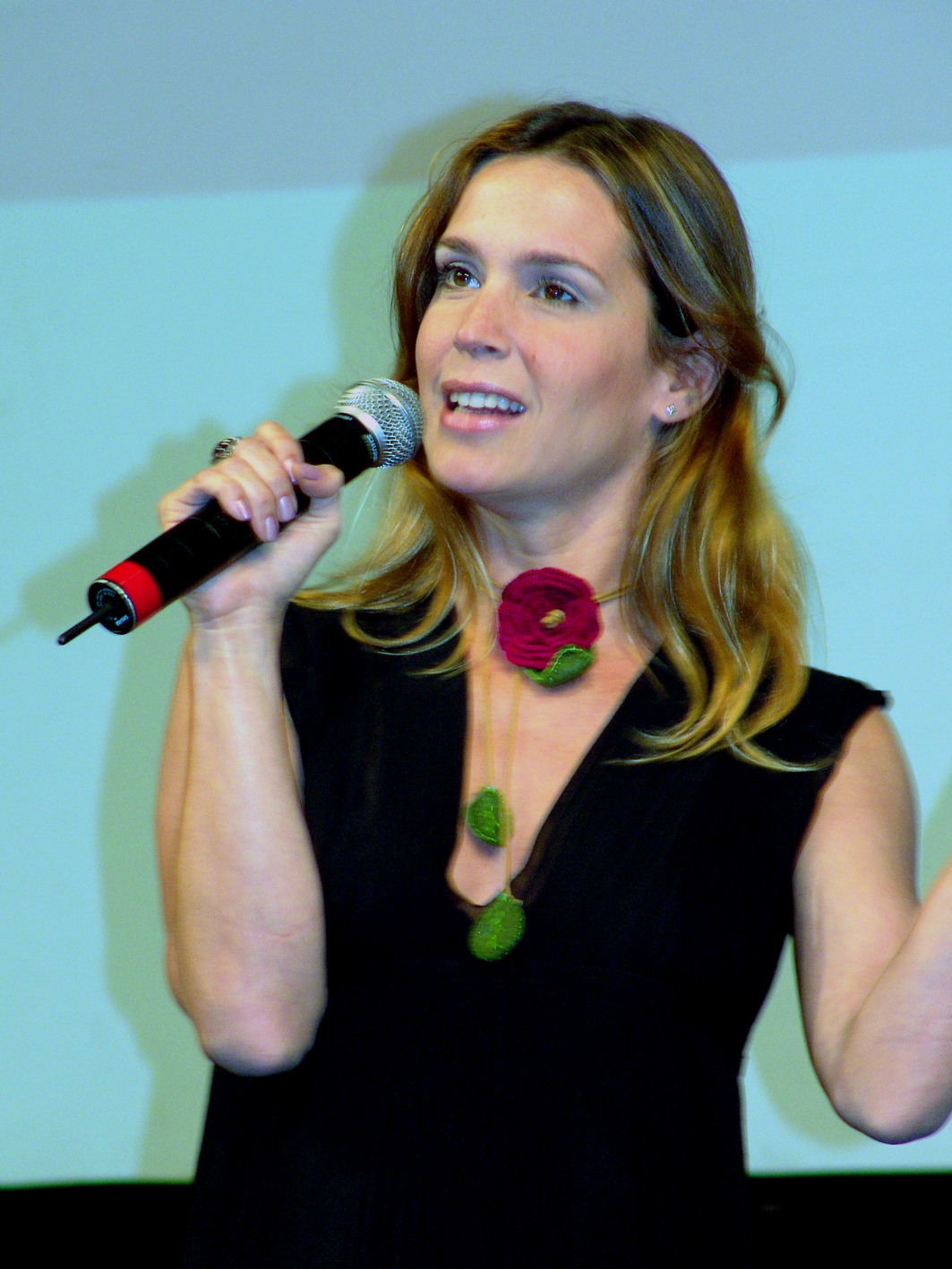
- Lóes in 2006
- Born: Vanessa Lóes de Melo; 26 November 1971 (age 54); Rio de Janeiro, Brazil
- Occupation: Actress
- Years active: 1995–2017
- Spouse: Thiago Lacerda (m. 2001)
- Children: 3
- Father: Victor di Mello
- Relatives: Lídia Mattos (grandmother)

Vanessa Lóes de Melo Lacerda (born 26 November 1971) is a Brazilian actress. She is married to actor Thiago Lacerda, with whom she has three children. Lóes is the granddaughter of actress Lídia Mattos.

== Filmography ==
=== Television ===
Televisão
Year	Title	Notes
1995	Engraçadinha... Seus Amores e Seus Pecados	Janete
1996	Vira-Lata	Pietra
1996	Caso Especial	
1997	Zazá	Lavínia Dumont Pietro
1999	Suave Veneno	Maria Antônia Cerqueira
2000	Você Decide	Vitória
2000	Marcas da Paixão	Cíntia
2002	O Quinto dos Infernos	Madalena
2002	Sabor da Paixão	Branca Jardim Malta
2003	Carga Pesada	Giselle
2003	Kubanacan	Anabela
2004	Metamorphoses (TV series)	Lia / Circe Cipriatis
2006	Avassaladoras - A Série	Laura
2008	Beleza Pura	Eleonora Amarante
2008	Dicas de um Sedutor	Priscila
2008	Guerra e Paz	Paola
2008	Casos e Acasos	Lígia / Regiane
2009	Geral.com	Lucélia
2012	Acampamento de Férias 3	Verônica
2012	A Vida da Gente	Laura
2012	Malhação	Tizinha (Beatriz Almeida)
