= Casos e Acasos =

Brazilian television series

Casos e Acasos is a series of Brazilian TV Globo Network, written by Daniel Adjafre and Marcius Melhem, the general direction of Carlos Milan core of Marcos Schechtman (until the 15th episode) and Jayme Monjardim (from the 16th episode). First aired as a special year-end on December 26, 2007, the program went live April 3, 2008 and no longer appears in the following year.

== Cast ==
=== Episode pilot ===
- Humberto Martins - Lauro
- Antônio Calloni - Ernesto
- Taís Araújo - Gabriela
- Ricardo Tozzi - Freitas
- Érika Evantini - Michele
- Thiago Fragoso - Felipe
- Danton Mello - Adriano
- Marcelo Valle - homem que se separa da mulher
- Fábio Araújo - Robson
- Bethito Tavares - Júnior
- Alexandre Nero - Marcos
- Paula Pereira - mulher que se separa do marido
- Clarice Derzié Luz - vendedora de alianças

Participação especial

- Francisco Cuoco - Feldman

=== 1º episódio ("O Encontro, o Assédio e o Convite") ===
- Marcos Palmeira - Renato
- Graziella Moretto - Suzana
- Hugo Carvana - Álvaro
- Dira Paes - Gisele
- Ingrid Guimarães - Camila
- Marcelo Várzea - Luiz Eduardo
- Fulvio Stefanini - Dr. Teixeira
- Danton Mello - Gustavo
- Fábio Nassar - Sérgio
- Aílton Graça - Denis
- Isabel Guéron - Tatiana
- Xuxa Lopes - Esposa de Teixeira
- Thatiana Pagung - Gracinha
- Clemente Viscaíno - Chefe de Suzana
- Augusto Madeira - Guto
- Cláudio Mendes - Cláudio
- Daniel Warren - Pereira

=== 2º episódio ("O colar, o cachorro e o DVD") ===
- Maurício Mattar - Diego
- Tania Khalill - Fabiana
- Cristiana Oliveira - Simone
- Fábio Araujo - Alexandre
- Christiana Kalache - Helena
- Francisco Cuoco - Dr. Edgar
- Betty Gofman - Daniela
- Clarice Derzié Luz - Carla
- Ernesto Piccolo - Milton

=== 3º episódio ("O flagra, a demissão e a adoção") ===
- Beth Goulart - Sandra
- Ernani Moraes - Leandro
- Marcelo Novaes - Paulo
- Guilhermina Guinle - Luiza
- Paulo Vilhena - Wilson
- Roberta Rodrigues - Emília
- Carla Regina - Carol
- Marcos Frota - Evandro
- Marcelo Valle - Tomás
- Henri Pagnoncelli - Orlando
- Edwin Luisi - Dr. Aristides
- Kacau Gomes - Márcia
- Marcelo Capobianco - Zé
- Wendell Bendelack - Ismael
- Anja Bittencourt - Celí
- Phil Miler - Ronaldo

=== 4º episode ("O triângulo, a tia Raquel e o pedido") ===
- Giovanna Antonelli - Jamile
- Ricardo Tozzi - Rodrigo
- Giselle Itié - Manuela
- Luigi Baricelli - Edgar
- Bia Seidl - Cristiana
- José Rubens Chachá - Vitor
- Luciana Braga - Denise
- Cláudio Mendes - Haroldo
- Malu Valle - Eliane
- Fernanda de Freitas - Joana
- Sérgio Marone - Pedro
- Antônio Pitanga - Médico
- Neusa Borges - Empregada de Denise
- Janaína Barbosa - Empresária
- Renan Ribeiro - Mateus
- Luisa Perissé - Nina
- João Vítor Silva - Lucas

=== 5º episódio ("O ex, a promoção e o vizinho") ===
- Henri Castelli - Marcelo
- Gabriela Duarte - Carol
- Eriberto Leão - Henrique
- Bruno Garcia - Carlos
- Mel Lisboa - Júlia
- Fúlvio Stefanini - Dr. Fontenelle
- Cláudia Provedel - Amanda
- Tato Gabus Mendes - Saulo
- João Miguel - Teles
- Priscila Sztejnman - Mônica

=== 6º episódio ("O desejo escondido, o cara reprimido e o livro roubado") ===
- Cissa Guimarães - Beth
- Kayky Brito - Tiago
- Vera Fischer - Vera
- Sérgio Hondjakoff - Rafael
- Luiz Carlos Vasconcelos - Gilberto Gomes
- Odilon Wagner - Lauro Diniz
- Milena Toscano - Catarina Savoy
- Angelita Feijó - Maria Helena
- Flávio Migliaccio - Olavo
- Thiago Fragoso - Cláudio
- Ana Lúcia Torre - Regina
- Danton Mello - Ulisses
- Maria Maya - Sílvia
- Celso Frateschi - Pai de Sílvia
- Rafael Primo - Valdir

=== 7º episódio ("A prova, a namorada e a isca") ===
- Cássia Kiss - Débora
- Paulo Betti - Mário
- Lidi Lisboa - Cléo
- Jairo Mattos - Celso
- Maria Flor - Fernanda
- Aílton Graça - Ricardo
- Carlo Briani - Péricles
- Totia Meireles - Catarina
- Thiago Amaral - André
- Márcia do Valle - Rose
- Manuela do Monte - Carol
- Beno Bider - Corretor

=== 8º episódio ("A escolha, a operação e a outra") ===
- Ney Latorraca - Walmor
- Joana Fomm - Eliete
- Samara Felippo - Sofia
- Alice Borges - Selma
- Roberta Rodrigues - Júlia
- Neuza Borges - Carmem
- Marcelo Médici - Téo
- Antônio Fragoso - Henrique
- Enrique Diaz - Fred
- Carolyna Aguiar - Dora
- Edmilson Barros - Jorge

=== 9º episódio ("O trote, o filho e o fora") ===
- Ricardo Tozzi - Renan
- Fernanda de Freitas - Maria Cecília
- Danton Mello - Wagner
- Thomas Veloso - Lucas
- Cris Couto - Maria Emília
- Eva Todor - Alba
- Tarcísio Filho - Marcondes
- André Arteche - Júnior
- Maurício Gonçalves - Toninho
- Mateus Solano - Gilson
- Guilherme Hundadze - Lucas

=== 10º episódio ("O presente, a sociedade e a tentação") ===
- Tato Gabus Mendes - Vicente
- Bianca Byington - Kika
- Leonardo Miggiorin - Maurício
- Grazi Massafera - Graziela
- Phellipe Haagensen - Jaime
- Luciele di Camargo - Soraya
- Emílio Orciollo Netto - Amadeu
- Bruce Gomlevsky - Ciro
- Vanessa Lóes - Lígia
- Joelson Medeiros - Matias
- Mariana Hein - Carla
- Rodrigo Penna - Odiado
- Paulo Vespúcio - Viciado

=== 11º episode ("O concurso, o vestido e a paternidade") ===
- Carla Diaz - Val
- Tatyane Goulart - Bel
- Babu Santana - Ozênio
- Luciana Rigueira - Valdirene
- Elias Gleizer - Aristides
- Marcelo Laham - Sílvio
- Pedro Neschling - Arthur
- Fúlvio Stefanini - Dr. Camilo
- Eduardo Martini - Belmiro
- Luciana Braga - Mother of Val
- Eliana Fonseca - Adriana
- Zé Vitor Castiel - Gilmar
- Rafael Ciani - Neto de Aristides
- Carlo Briani - Genro de Aristides
- Orã Figueiredo - Genro de Aristides
- Rosaly Papadopol - Filha de Aristides
- Ana Baird - Filha de Aristides

=== 12º episódio ("A foto, a troca e o furto") ===
- Isabela Garcia - Letícia
- Eriberto Leão - Erasmo
- Sérgio Marone - Wilson (Bombeiro Bombado)
- Betty Gofman - Mariana
- Alexandre Borges - Vinícius
- Fernanda Vasconcellos - Bianca
- Rodrigo Phavanello - Fábio Kiusa
- Marcelo Novaes - Reinaldo
- Pascoal da Conceição - Dr. Arruda
- Miele - Dono do Clube das Mulheres
- Ranieri Gonzalez - Lúcio
- Paulo José - Fulvio
- Paloma Riani - Bia
- Caio Lasmar - Tiago
- Pedro Lucas Lopes - Pedro
- Gláucio Gomes - Gláucio

=== 13º episódio ("O colchão, a mala e a balada") ===
- Vivianne Pasmanter - Suzana
- Tarcísio Filho - Marcos
- Bete Mendes - Hilda
- Marcos Caruso - Adauto
- Guilherme Berenguer - Marcelo
- Fernanda Paes Leme - Cristiane
- Mário Frias - Nelson
- Marco Antônio Gimenez - Jorge
- Duda Ribeiro - Tarcísio
- Rafael Zulu - Alex
- Alexandre da Costa - Segurança do Aeroporto
- Pedro Garcia Netto - Mota
- Paulo Miklos - Chefe de segurança do Aeroporto
- Nando Cunha - Rui
- Simone Soares - Hannah
- Henrique Taxman
- Ana Jansen
- Mariana Bassoul

=== 14º episódio ("O carro, o e-mail e o rapper") ===
- Carol Machado - Camila
- Rodrigo Lombardi - Inácio
- Joana Balaguer - Natasha
- Juliana Didone - Bianca
- Wagner Santisteban - Michel
- Créo Kellab - Lúcio / Tony Z
- Miguel Thiré - Adriano
- Tereza Seiblitz - Eduarda
- Augusto Madeira - Juca
- Marcos Frota - César
- Blota Filho - Augusto
- Murilo Grossi - perito
- Paulo Tiefenthaler - Freitas
- Marcelo Várzea - Vítor
- Flavia Rubim - Lara
- Clara Garcia - Chiara
- Marcos Baô - barman do restaurante
- Vinícius Manne - cliente do restaurante

=== 15º episódio ("A nova namorada, o chefe e o dia fértil") ===
- Leona Cavalli - Célia
- Ângelo Antônio - Rogério
- Rita Guedes - Carol
- Natália do Vale - Fernanda
- Tania Khalill - Iara
- Marcelo Médici - Gustavo
- Juan Alba - Otávio
- Fabíula Nascimento - Susy
- Francisco Cuoco - Anísio
- Ricardo Duque - Breno
- Flávio Migliaccio - Rangel
- Juliana Alves - Joelma
- Suely Franco - Mãe de Carol

=== 16º episódio ("A blitz, o presente e os filhos") ===
- Luigi Baricelli - Hugo
- Guilhermina Guinle - Regina
- Armando Babaioff - Gil
- Maria Fernanda - Luiza
- Bruno Lucas - Diego
- Monique Lafond - Anita
- Marcos Breda - Luiz
- Marcelo Valle - Rogério
- Paulo Goulart - Zenildo
- Fábio Araújo - Clóvis
- Narjara Turetta - Vilma
- Íris Bustamante - Selma
- Betty Erthal - Diva
- Kiko Mascarenhas - Josué
- Renata Tobelem - Beatriz

=== 17º episódio ("O diagnóstico, o fetiche e a bebida") ===
- Paulo Betti - Mauro
- Camila Morgado - Juliana
- André Gonçalves - Gerson
- Nívea Stelmann - Cíntia
- Herson Capri - Hugo
- Virgínia Cavendish - Luciana
- Alice Borges - Selma
- Lúcio Mauro - Dr. Rangel
- Luísa Thiré - Marilía
- Duda Mamberti - Dirceu
- Eva Todor - Paciente
- Gillray Coutinho - médico

=== 18º episódio ("Quem é Amanda? Quem mandou o bombom? Quem passou a noite comigo?") ===
- Letícia Spiller - Cléo
- Fernanda Rodrigues - Letícia
- Emílio Orciollo Netto - Edu
- Odilon Wagner - JP
- Giselle Itié - Lara
- Samara Felippo - Ana
- Sidney Sampaio - Luciano
- Cris Vianna - Marta
- Marcos Winter - Afonso
- Franciely Freduzeski - Amanda
- Bruno Padilha - Oliver
- Daniela Pessoa - Veronica
- Mariana Xavier - Susana
- Victor Frade - Stênio

=== 19º episódio ("O beijo, a foto e o empréstimo") ===
- Luís Melo - Linhares
- Rosane Gofman - Dona Marlene
- Ana Lima - Raquel
- Eri Johnson - Miguel
- Ícaro Silva - Luciano
- Nando Cunha - Jofre
- Paulo Gustavo Barros - Vitor
- Enrique Diaz - Caetano
- Pia Manfroni - Viviany
- Joelson Medeiros - Daniel
- Hugo Gross - Paolo
- Daniel Warren
- Márcio Vito
- Chico Terrah - Torquato
- Cláudio Torres Gonzaga - gerente do restaurante
- Anja Bittencourt - Sandra
- Ricardo Fogliatto
- Marcos Ferreira
- Tatih Köhler - aluna da universidade
- Ricardo Marrecos
- Aires Jorge
- Thiago Neri
- Dirce Migliaccio - avó de Raquel

=== 20º episódio ("A noiva, o desempregado e o fiscal") ===
- Priscila Fantin - Franciele
- Júlio Rocha - Uesley
- Henri Castelli - Marlon
- Marcelo Laham - Jorge
- Isabela Garcia - Cristina
- Mário Frias - Henrique
- Marcelo Várzea - Leandro
- Rodrigo Penna - Robertinho
- Alcemar Vieira - Jairo
- Cláudio Mendes - Edson
- John Herbert - padre
- Celso Frateschi
- Paulo Carvalho
- Cristina Prochaska - Regina
- Pietro Mário - tio de Franciele
- Otto Jr. - Norton
- Maria Regina - Marta
- Gabriel Kaufmann - Pedro

=== 21º episódio ("A garota, o vestibular e os ingressos") ===
- Sérgio Marone - Jéferson
- Bárbara Borges - Jaque
- Fúlvio Stefanini - Nestor
- Betty Erthal - Adelaide
- Wagner Santisteban - André
- Gregório Duvivier - Vitor
- Alamo Facó - Fábio
- Pedro Neschling - Alfredo
- Paulo César Grande - Maurício
- Marcos Breda - Gilberto
- Clarice Derzié Luz - Mara
- Adriano Garib - Antônio
- Cláudia Ventura - Matilde
- Kiko Mascarenhas
- Daiane Amêndola

=== 22º episódio ("A vaga, a entrevista e o cachorro-quente") ===
- Marília Pêra - Juíza Sônia
- Marcelo Médici - Roberto
- Júlia Lemmertz - Carla
- Paulo José - Àlvaro
- Flávio Bauraqui - Edvaldo
- Arieta Corrêa - Sara Lee
- Fafy Siqueira - Mônica Sá
- Renata Castro Barbosa - Rafaela
- Thaís Garayp - Solange
- Pascoal da Conceição - Túlio
- Ricardo Kosovski - Rodrigo
- Gilberto Miranda - João
- Cláudia Provedel - advogada

=== 23º episódio ("O encontro, o homem ideal e a estréia confusa") ===
- Fernanda Machado - Adriana
- Ingrid Guimarães - Nina
- Ernesto Piccolo - Artur
- Augusto Madeira - Edmundo
- Marcos Winter - Fábio Basrsovski
- Bianca Byington - Adélia
- Odilon Wagner - Lourenço
- Ricardo Blat - Oliveire
- Bruno Padilha - René
- Tatyane Goulart - Beth
- Roberto Lopes - garçom

=== 24° episódio ("As testemunhas, o hóspede e os amantes") ===
- Murilo Rosa - Cássio
- Juliana Knust - Júlia
- Emílio Orciollo Neto - Carlinhos
- Nando Cunha - Lauro
- Fabíula Nascimento - Lúcia
- Orã Figueiredo - Brito
- Lúcio Mauro - Geraldo
- Aracy Balabanian - Amélia
- Gillray Coutinho - Dr. Astolfo
- Thalita Carauta - Regina
- Ricardo Duque - Luiz

=== 25º episódio ("A aliança, a queixa e a revista") ===
- Tarcísio Filho - Wagner
- Gabriela Duarte - Vivianne
- Ithamar Lembo - Lúcio
- Pia Manfroni - Germana
- Inez Viana - Daniela
- Henrique Ramiro - Saulo
- César Cardadeiro - André
- Cássia Kiss - Marilene
- Marcos Breda - Ronaldo
- Isaac Bardavid - Pedro Paulo
- Gláucio Gomes - delegado
- Igor Paiva - Policial Silva
- Cristiana Pompeo - camareira
- Adriane Piovesani - Fátima

=== 26º episódio ("O teste, o gato e o rejeitado") ===
- Flávia Alessandra - Gilda
- Bárbara Borges - Débora
- Nelson Xavier - Armando
- Joelson Medeiros - Oscar
- Georgiana Góes - Monique
- Mayana Moura - Penélope
- Bia Montez - Judite
- Cláudia Ventura - Rejane
- Cláudio Galvan - Juvenal
- Saulo Arcoverde - Heitor
- Camila Caputti - produtora do comercial

=== 27º episódio ("A dominatrix, a venda e a babá") ===
- Maria Luísa Mendonça - Olívia
- Eri Johnson - Fábio
- Cláudio Mendes - Samuel
- Giselle Itié - Cristina
- Edwin Luisi - Alencar
- Carol Machado - Marta
- Alexandre Zacchia - Bira
- Daniel Warren - Tiago
- Fernando Alves Pinto - Carlo
- Jorge Lucas - vizinho de Olívia
- Daniela Pessoa - Renata
- Sérgio Monte - Adílson

=== 28º episódio ("A fuga arriscada, a nova namorada e o recheio do bolo") ===
- Alinne Moraes - Giane
- Henri Castelli - Serginho
- Lui Mendes - Edu
- Sérgio Marone - Léo
- Débora Lamm - Cláudia
- Carlos Casagrande - Flávio
- Fiorella Mattheis - Mariana
- Celso Frateschi - Renato
- Luca de Castro - treinador do time de futebol
- Rodrigo Candelot - Nélson

=== 29º episódio ("O ultimato, o vândalo e a pensão") ===
- Marcos Frota - Alberto
- Cissa Guimarães - Marília
- Deborah Evelyn - Glória
- Fernanda Machado - Fabíola
- Guilherme Weber - Rodrigo
- Kiko Mascarenhas - Olavo
- Ricardo Duque - César
- Priscila Assum - Margô
- Rafael Miguel - Tiago
- Sylvia Massari - Solange
- Paulo César Grande
- Maurício Gonçalves
- João Camargo

=== 30º episódio ("O celular, a viagem e o dia seguinte") ===
- Marcelo Médici - Tomás
- André Ramiro - Bruno
- Monique Alfradique - Gabriela
- Suzana Pires - Regina
- Pedro Neschling - Ramon
- Marcelo Laham - Natan
- Domingos de Oliveira - Bartolomeu
- Sheron Menezes - Júlia
- Isaac Bardavid - Otacílio
- Lucélia Santos - Lucila
- Pitty Webo - Isadora
- Hilda Rebello - Mafalda
- Buza Ferraz - Jairo
- Thaís Garayp - Benedita

=== 31º episódio ("Ele é ela, ela é ele e ela ou eu") ===
- Murilo Rosa - Rubens
- Samara Felippo - Bianca
- Mônica Martelli - Valéria
- Dalton Vigh - Manoel
- Sílvia Pfeifer - Ana Paula Gueiros
- Gianne Albertoni - Milene Richter
- Carlo Porto - Ely
- Alexandre da Costa - Araújo
- Alice Borges - Marisa
- Jorge Lucas - Pedrão
- Paulo Gustavo Barros - John
- Ricca Barros
- Silvio Ferrari
- Alessandro Anes
- Mario Diegues

=== 32º episódio ("O parto, o batom e o passaporte") ===
- Guilherme Fontes - Chico
- Cristiana Oliveira - Bárbara
- Fúlvio Stefanini - Olavo
- Bruno Mazzeo - Jonas
- Daniele Valente - Sueli
- Mouhamed Harfouch - Leandro
- Bete Mendes
- Bia Montez - Norma
- Luiz Magnelli - Jorge
- Zéu Britto - Mário
- Lionel Fischer - médico
- Antônio Fragoso - Dirceu
- Anilza Leoni - mãe de Sueli

=== 33º episódio ("A volta, a cena e as férias") ===
- Eri Johnson - Pedro
- Maria Clara Gueiros - Marina
- Kiko Mascarenhas - Oscar
- Marcos Breda - Leandro
- Carolyna Aguiar - Vilma
- Thelmo Fernandes - Nereu
- Rita Guedes - Ivete
- Erik Marmo - Tico
- Augusto Madeira - Botelho
- Paulo Vespúcio - Miro
- Jairo Mattos - Lucas
- Thalita Carauta - Zefa
- Rui Rezende - Luiz
- Júlia Cruz - Duda
- Lucilia de Assis - Cida

=== 34º episode ("A ciumenta, o ciumento e o ciúme") ===
- Maurício Gonçalves - Rodrigo
- Guilhermina Guinle - Renata
- Guilherme Weber - Sérgio
- Isabela Garcia - Andréia
- Rodrigo López - Miro
- Regiane Alves - Aline
- Ângelo Antônio - Fábio
- Juliana Knust - Patrícia
- José Augusto Branco - Inácio
- Xandy Britto - Walter
- Tamara Taxman - professora de strip
- Henrique Taxman
- Isabela Lobato

=== 35º episode ("A câmera escondida, o porta-"mala" e o chá de fralda") ===
- Betty Lago - Magali
- Sheron Menezes - Rafaela
- Eriberto Leão - Cadu
- Sérgio Hondjakoff - Pedro
- Wagner Santisteban - Luciano
- Bruno de Luca - Heitor
- Joelson Medeiros - Luiz Carlos
- Vanessa Lóes - Regiane
- Babu Santana - Célio
- Ernesto Piccolo - Max
- Mary Sheyla - Vanda
- Nando Cunha - inspetor
- Duda Mamberti - Amaral
- William Vita - Dos Anjos
- Íris Bustamante - Carol
- Edgard Amorim - Luiz Henrique
- Oberdan Júnior - Toninho
- Fernando Ceylão - Souza
- Thaíssa Carvalho - Ana
- Clara Garcia
- Beth Raposo
- Vanessa Machado
- Cinara Leal
- Tatianna Trintex
- Patrícia Bacha

=== 36º episódio ("O Papai Noel, a perna quebrada e o presépio") ===
- Emílio Orciollo Neto - Enio Soriano
- Paola Oliveira - Verônica
- Bruno Mazzeo - Zé
- Carol Machado - Gabi
- Cláudio Mendes - Papai Noel Alessandro
- Bia Seidl - Paloma
- Giulio Lopes - Leonardo
- Carlos Vereza - Tio Jayme
- Betty Erthal - Maria Pia
- Hilda Rebello - Dona Isabela
- Ary França - Adriano
- Pia Manfroni - Vaquinha
- Flávio Bauraqui - Rei Mago
- Gillray Coutinho - Marcos
- Marcelo Laham - Avelino
- Cláudia Ventura - gerente da loja
- Joelson Gusson - segurança
