= Luciana Braga =

Brazilian actress

- Born: Luciana Braga Ribeiro Ramos; 16 December 1962 (age 62); Rio de Janeiro, Brazil
- Years active: 1986–present
- Spouse: Maneco Quinderé (m. 1993)
- Children: 2

Luciana Braga Ribeiro Ramos (born 16 December 1962) is a Brazilian actress.

== Career ==
She made her television debut in 1986, in the soap opera Sinhá Moça.

She also appeared in the Rede Manchete in the soap operas Helena, 1987, in which she was the protagonist, and Olho por Olho, 1988.

In 1989, participated in the novel Tieta, interpreting Maria Imaculada, one of the rolinhas of the Colonel (Ary Fontoura). Later it participated of other novelas like Meu Bem, Meu Mal and Renascer, both from TV Globo.

In 1994, she signed with SBT, and was featured in two soap operas there, Éramos Seis and As Pupilas do Senhor Reitor.

In 2008, she played the villain Denise in the soap opera Negócio da China.

In May 2009, she signed a contract with RecordTV. At the station she made soap operas like Poder Paralelo, Vidas em Jogo, Vitória and A Terra Prometida.

In 2018, the actress enters to the fixed list of Detetives do Prédio Azul, living the main villain of the tenth season.

== Personal life ==
Luciana is married to the theatrical illuminator Maneco Quinderé since 1993, they have two daughters, Isabel and Laura.

== Filmography ==
=== Television ===
Year	Title	Role	Notes
1986	Sinhá Moça	Juliana	
1987	Helena	Helena	
1988	Olho por Olho	Lana	
1989	Tieta	Maria Imaculada	
1990	Meu Bem, Meu Mal	Dirce Aparecida Alves	
1992	Pedra sobre Pedra	Eliane (mother of Eliane)	First phase
1993	Renascer	Sandra Gouveia Martinez	
1994	Éramos Seis	Maria Isabel	
1994	As Pupilas do Senhor Reitor	Clara	
1998	Você Decide	Clarice	Episode: "Um Lar Para Clarice"
2002	Esperança	Adelaide	
2006	Bang Bang	Clark widow	Episodes: "March 13–April 17, 2006"
2006	O Profeta	Sofia de Abranches Leite	
2008	Casos e Acasos	Denise	Episode: "O Triângulo, a Tia Raquel e o Pedido"
2008	Casos e Acasos	Mother of Val	Episode: "O Concurso, o Vestido e a Paternidade"
2008	Negócio da China	Denise Dumas	
2009	Poder Paralelo	Laila Karin	
2011	Vidas em Jogo	Fátima Silveira Magalhães	
2013	Pecado Mortal	Rosa	
2014	Vitória	Matilde Nogueira Gorgulho	
2015	Conselho Tutelar	Galega	
2016	A Terra Prometida	Yana	
2018	Detetives do Prédio Azul	Witch Marga	Season 10
2020	Éramos Seis	Zulmira de Sousa	Guest star
2022	Back to 15	Vânia Rocha	Recurring role, seasons 1–2

=== Films ===
Year	Title	Role	Notes
1998	Policarpo Quaresma, Herói do Brasil	Ismênia	
2002	Poeta de Sete Faces		Documentary
2003	Rua 6, Sem Número	Lenira	
2003	Dom	Daniela	
2018	O Paciente – O Caso Tancredo Neves	Inês Maria Neves	
2021	Lulli	Miriam	
