= Marcos Palmeira =

Brazilian actor

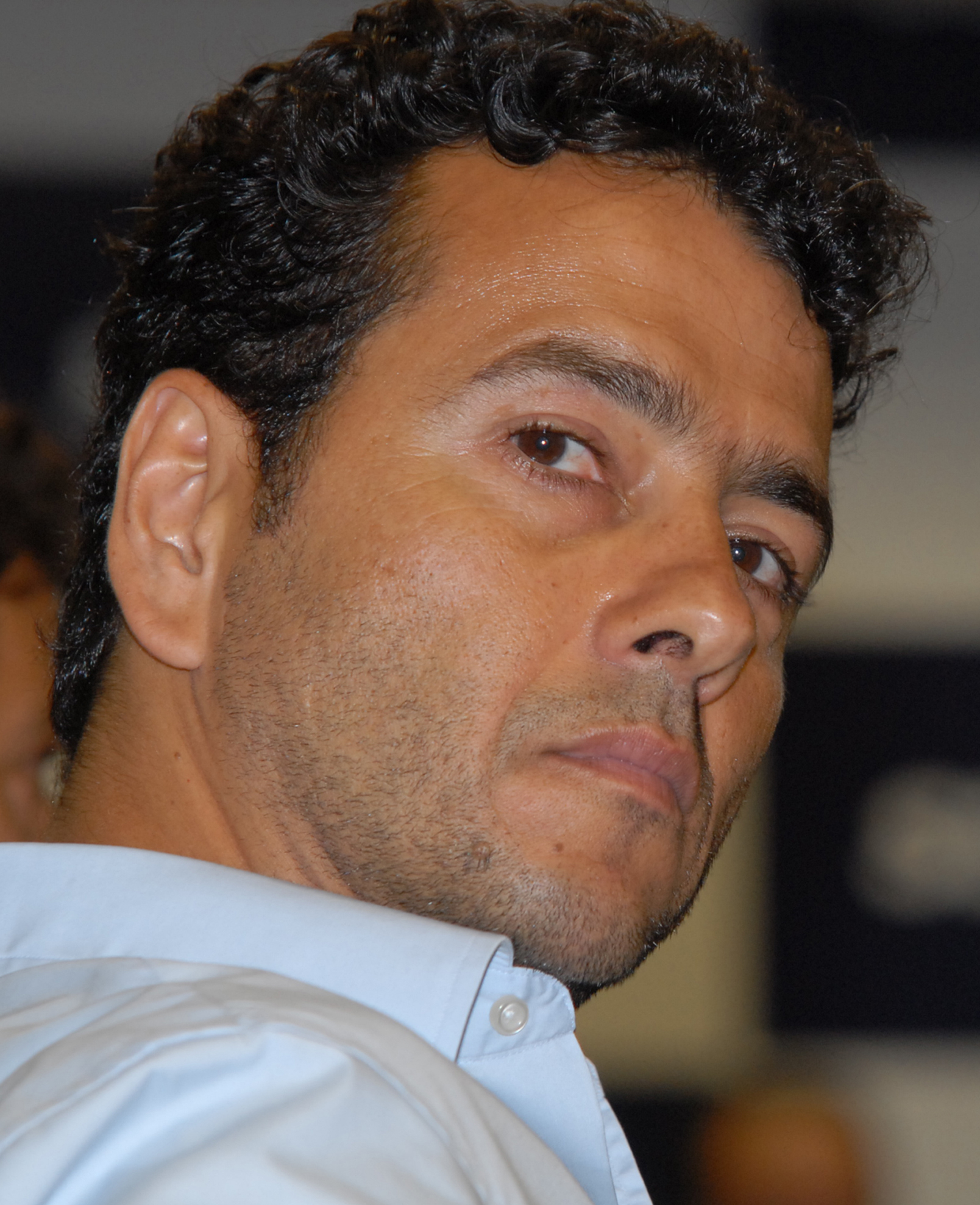
- Palmeira in 2007
- Born: Marcos Palmeira de Paula; 19 August 1963 (age 62); Rio de Janeiro, Brazil
- Occupations: Actor, TV host, producer
- Years active: 1968–present
- Spouses: Vanessa Barum (m. 1993; div. 1998) Amora Mautner (m. 2005; div. 2012) Gabriela Gastal (m. 2016)
- Children: 1
- Relatives: Chico Anysio (uncle); Lupe Gigliotti (aunt); Nizo Neto (cousin); Maria Maya (cousin)

Marcos Palmeira de Paula (born 19 August 1963) is a Brazilian actor, TV host and producer. He is nephew of the siblings Chico Anysio and Lupe Gigliotti. In 2013, he was nominated for an International Emmy Award for best actor for his role in the series Mandrake.

== Filmography ==
=== Television ===
Year	Title	Role	Notes
1975	O Menino Atrasado	Juninho	End of Year Special
1985	Chico Anysio Show	Clisares	Cameo
1986	Roda de Fogo	Boy who helps Renato	Cameo
1987	Mandala	Young Creonte Silveira	Episodes: "October 12–14"
1988	Vale Tudo	Mário Sérgio	
1990	Desejo	Solón	
1990	Pantanal	Tadeu Aparecido Leôncio	
1991	Amazônia	Caio Mangabeira	
1991	Amazônia	Lúcio	
1992	Você Decide	Chico	Episode: "Laços de Família"
1993	Renascer	João Pedro Inocêncio	
1994	Memorial de Maria Moura	Cirino	
1995	Irmãos Coragem	João Coragem	
1996	A Vida Como Ela é..	Menezes	
1996	A Comédia da Vida Privada	Tadeu	Episode: "A Próxima Atração"
1996	Salsa e Merengue	Valentim Muñoz	
1998	Torre de Babel	Alexandre Leme Toledo	
1999	Andando nas Nuvens	Francisco Mota "Chico Mota"	
2000	Esplendor	Francisco Hodges	
2001	Porto dos Milagres	Gumercindo Vieira "Guma"	
2002	Brava Gente	Bolado	Episode: "A Hora Errada"
2002	Coração de Estudante	Julio Rosa	Episodes: "September 2–27"
2002	Esperança	José Carlos Merilo "Zequinha"	
2003	Celebridade	Fernando Amorim	
2004	Histórias de Cama & Mesa	Bob	End of Year Special
2005	Belíssima	Delegate Gilberto Moura	
2006	Cilada	Daniel	Episode: "Supermercado"
2005–07	Mandrake	Doctor Paulo Mendes "Mandrake"	
2008	Três Irmãs	Bento Rio Preto	
2008	Casos e Acasos	Renato	Episode: "O Encontro, O Assédio e O Convite"
2008–10	A'Uwe	Presenter	
2009	Cama de Gato	Gustavo de Almeida Brandão / Vicente	
2012	As Brasileiras	Anderson	Episode: "A Justiceira de Olinda"
2012	As Brasileiras	Fernando	Episode: "A De Menor do Amazonas"
2012	Cheias de Charme	Sandro Barbosa	
2012	Mandrake	Doctor Paulo Mendes "Mandrake"	Telefilm
2013	O Canto da Sereia	Agostinho Matoso "Augustão"	
2013	Saramandaia	Cazuza Moreira	
2014	O Rebu	Delegate Nuno Pedroso	
2014	A Segunda Vez	Raul	
2015	Babilônia	Aderbal Pimenta	
2016	E Aí... Comeu?	Honório Alves Durões	
2016	Velho Chico	Cícero "Ciço"	
2017	Os Dias Eram Assim	Toni Pereira	
2018	Manual de Sobrevivência para o Século XXI	Presenter	
2019	A Dona do Pedaço	Amadeu Matheus	
2019	A Divisão	Luís Henrique Benício "Benício"	
2022	Pantanal	José Leôncio	
2024	Renascer	José Inocêncio	
2024	City of God: The Fight Rages On	Curió	
2025	Três Graças	Joaquim Monteiro	

=== Film ===
Year	Title	Role	Notes
1968	Copacabana Me Engana	—N/a	
1982	O Segredo da Múmia	Marcos Viana	
1984	Garota Dourada	Matheus	
1984	Nunca Fomos tão Felizes	Internal Student	
1984	Memoirs of Prison	—N/a	
1985	A Espera		Short film
1986	S.O.S. Brunet	Odelei	Short film
1986	A Cor do seu Destino	Raul	
1986	Fulaninha	Rubinho	
1986	Trancado por Dentro	Cadú	Short film
1987	Ele, o Boto	Fisherman	
1987	Leila Diniz	Marcelinho	
1987	Romance da Empregada	Luiz	
1987	Um Trem para as Estrelas	Jacaré	
1988	Dedé Mamata	Alpino	
1988	Por Dúvidas das Vias	Xerox Guy	Short film
1990	Barrela: Escola de Crimes	Tirica	
1990	Stelinha	Eurico	
1990	Les Cavaliers aux Yeux Verts	Joachim	
1991	Vai Trabalhar, Vagabundo II: a Volta	Edu	
1995	Carlota Joaquina, Princess of Brazil		
1996	Buena Sorte	Edgar	
1997	Anahy de las Misiones	Solano	
1997	O Amor Está no Ar	Carlos Henrique	
1998	Como Ser Solteiro	Julinho	
2000	Villa-Lobos - Uma Vida de Paixão	Heitor Villa-Lobos	
2001	O Casamento de Louise	Bugre	
2003	Dom	Bentinho	
2003	Oswaldo Cruz - O Médico do Brasil	Oswaldo Cruz	Short film
2004	Expedição A’Uwe - A Volta de Tsiwari	Himself	Documentary
2007	O Tablado e Maria Clara Machado	Himself	Documentary
2007	O Homem que Desafiou o Diabo	Zé Araújo / Ojuara	
2008	A Mulher do meu Amigo	Thales	
2009	Quase um Tango...	Marcelino Van Der Amstel "Batavo"	
2009	Bela Noite para Voar	Carlos Lacerda	
2012	E Aí... Comeu?	Honório Alves Durões	
2013	Vendo ou Alugo	Jorge	
2014	Os Homens São de Marte... E É Pra Lá que Eu Vou	Tom Rodrigues	
2014	A Noite da Virada	Mario	
2016	The Jungle Book	Balu (voice)	Brazilian Dubbing
2018	Minha Vida em Marte	Tom Rodrigues	
2019	O Barulho da Noite	Agenor	
2020	Boca de Ouro	Boca de Ouro	
2020	A Divisão: O Filme	Luís Henrique Benício	
2021	Intervenção: É Proibido Morrer	Major Douglas	

=== Internet ===
Year	Title	Role
2020	Teocracia em Vertigem	Manifestant

=== Audiobooks ===
Year	Title	Role
2023	Dom Casmurro por Machado de Assis	Narrator

== Stage ==
Year	Title	Role
1975	Édipo Rei	
1976	O Boi e o Burro a Caminho de Belém	
1978	Incelença	
1979	Deus e o Povo Minha Ira e Minha Esperança	
1981	O Diamante do Grão Mongol	
1982	Os Meninos da Rua Paulo	
1984	Maria Minhoca	
1984	Chapetuba Futebol Clube	
1985	Os XII Trabalhos de Hércules – II Parte	
1986	Quem matou o Leão?	
1986	Larga do Meu Pé	
1987	Ligações Perigosas	
1988	Uma Lição Longe Demais	
1993	Othello	Othello
1999	Diário Secreto de Adão e Eva	Adão
2002	Mais Uma Vez Amor	Rodrigo
2007	Virgolino e Maria – Auto de Angicos	Virgolino (Lampião)

== Awards and nominations ==
Year	Award	Category	Work nominated	Result
1988	Festival de Gramado	Kikito de Ouro of Best Supporting Actor	Dedé Mamata	Won
1988	Prêmio Lei Sarney	Best New Actor	Dedé Mamata	Won
1990	Festival de Gramado	Kikito de Ouro of Best Actor	Barrela - Escola de Crimes	Won
1997	Festival de Brasília	Trophy Candango of Best Actor	Anahy de las Misiones	Won
2002	Troféu Imprensa	Best Actor	Porto dos Milagres	Nominated
2002	Prêmio Contigo! de TV	Best Romantic Couple	Porto dos Milagres	Nominated
2003	Prêmio Contigo! de TV	Best Comic Actor	Esperança	Nominated
2004	Prêmio Contigo! de TV	Best Soap Opera Actor	Celebridade	Nominated
2004	Prêmio Austregésilo de Athayde	Best Actor	Celebridade	Won
2004	Festival de Cinema de Varginha	Best Actor	Dom	Won
2008	Prêmio Trip Transformadores	Food - Management and Intelligence	Farm Vale das Palmeiras	Won
2009	Festival de Gramado	Best Actor	Quase um Tango...	Nominated
2010	Prêmio Qualidade Brasil	Best Actor	Cama de Gato	Nominated
2010	Prêmio Faz Diferença	Corporate reason	Fazenda Vale das Palmeiras	Won
2012	Prêmio Quem de Cinema	Best Actor	E Aí... Comeu?	Nominated
2013	Prêmio Extra de Televisão	Best Supporting Actor	Cheias de Charme	Nominated
2013	Prêmio Quem de Televisão	Best Supporting Actor	Cheias de Charme	Nominated
2013	Emmy Internacional	Best International Actor	Mandrake	Nominated
2013	Cine Ceará	Trophy Eusélio Oliveira	Homenagem	Won
2015	Prêmio Extra de Televisão	Best Supporting Actor	Babilônia	Nominated
2019	Brazilian Film Festival of Miami	Best Actor	Boca de Ouro	Nominated
2021	Festival Sesc Melhores Filmes	Best National Actor	Boca de Ouro	Nominated
2021	Prêmio Platino	Best Male Performance	Boca de Ouro	Nominated
2021	Grande Prêmio do Cinema Brasileiro	Best Actor	Boca de Ouro	Won
2022	Prêmio Notícias de TV	Best Actor	Pantanal	Won
2022	Melhores do Ano NaTelinha	Best Actor	Pantanal	Nominated
2022	Melhores do Ano	Soap Opera actor	Pantanal	Nominated
2022	Prêmio Contigo! Online	Best Soap Opera Actor	Pantanal	Nominated
2022	Melhores do Ano AnaMaria	Actor of The Year	Pantanal	Nominated
2022	Veja Rio - Cariocas do Ano	Television	Pantanal	Won
2022	Prêmio Área VIP	Best Actor	Pantanal	Nominated
2023	Troféu Internet	Best Soap Opera Actor	Pantanal	Pending
2023	Prêmio APCA de Televisão	Best Actor	Pantanal	Nominated
2023	Prêmio iBest	Protagonist Influencer	Pantanal	Nominated
2024	Prêmio Notícias de TV.com	Best Protagonist Actor	Renascer	Won
2024	Prêmio Área VIP	Best Actor	Renascer	Pending
2024	Melhores do Ano	Telenovela Actor	Renascer	Won
