= Maria José Dupré =

Brazilian writer (1905–1984)

- Born: 1905
- Died: May 15, 1984 (aged 79); Guarujá, São Paulo, Brazil
- Occupation: Novelist
- Writing career
- Pen name: Sra. Leandro Dupré
- Language: Portuguese
- Period: 1938-??
- Genre: Novels
- Notable work: Éramos Seis (1943)
- Notable awards: Raul Pompeia Prize (1943)

Maria José Dupré, also known as Sra. Leandro Dupré (1905 – 15 May 1984), was one of the most popular and prolific Brazilian writers of the 1940s and 1950s.

== Early life ==
Born in 1905 in a small town in the state of São Paulo, Dupré published her first story "Uma Família Antiga de Jaboticabal" ("An Old Family from Jaboticabal") in the newspaper O Estado de S. Paulo in 1978.

== Novels ==
Dupré published her first novel, O Romance de Teresa Bernard ("The Romance of Teresa Bernard"), in 1941. Her next novel, Éramos Seis, was written in 1943 and praised by writer and critic Monteiro Lobato and became a best-seller. Chronicling the struggles of a middle-class family in São Paulo, the novel was awarded the Raul Pompeia Prize for best work of 1943 by the Brazilian Academy of Letters. Dupré wrote Luz e Sombra ("Light and Dark") in 1944, Gina in 1945, and Os Rodriguez ("The Rodriguezes") in 1946. She published a sequel to Éramos Seis called Dona Lola in 1949.

== Impact ==
Éramos Seis has been adapted as a telenovela five times, in 1958, 1967, 1977, 1994 and 2019.

== Later life ==
Dupré died on 15 May 1984 in Guarujá, São Paulo, Brazil.
