= Éramos Seis (novel) =

1943 Brazilian novel by Maria José Dupré

Éramos Seis "We Were Six"
- Classic cover of the paperback edition
- Author: Maria José Dupré
- Language: Portuguese
- Genre: Novel
- Published: 1943
- Publication place: Brazil
- Media type: Print
- Followed by: Dona Lola

Éramos Seis ("We Were Six") is a 1943 Brazilian novel by Maria José Dupré about a struggling middle-class family in São Paulo. Praised by writer and critic Monteiro Lobato, it became a best-selling novel and was awarded the Raul Pompeia Prize for best work of 1943 by the Brazilian Academy of Letters. Dupré published a sequel called Dona Lola in 1949.

Éramos Seis has been adapted as a telenovela six times, in 1958, 1960, 1967, 1977, 1994 and 2019.

== Plot ==
Éramos Seis chronicles the struggles of a middle-class family in São Paulo through the eyes of its matriarch Dona Lola.

== Reception ==
Éramos Seis was praised by writer and critic Monteiro Lobato and became a best-selling novel. It was awarded the Raul Pompeia Prize for best work of 1943 by the Brazilian Academy of Letters. Darlene Joy Sadlier writes that Lola's "strength, good humor, love, and ingenuity make for a compelling image of the 'ordinary' wife and mother." She notes that the novel's title is poignant because Lola's husband dies halfway through and the family subsequently disintegrates. The popularity of Lola with the Brazilian public prompted Dupré to publish the sequel Dona Lola in 1949.

== Adaptations ==
The first adaptation it was a movie Argentines of 1945, in the same year the Brazilian radio soap opera was broadcast. To date, Éramos Seis has been adapted for television six times. It was first presented as a telenovela by Rede Record in 1958. the second version was in 1960 by TV Itacolomi from Belo Horizonte. The novel was next adapted twice by Rede Tupi in 1967 and 1977, and by Sistema Brasileiro de Televisão in 1994. Finally, it was adapted by Rede Globo in 2019.
