= Xamã =

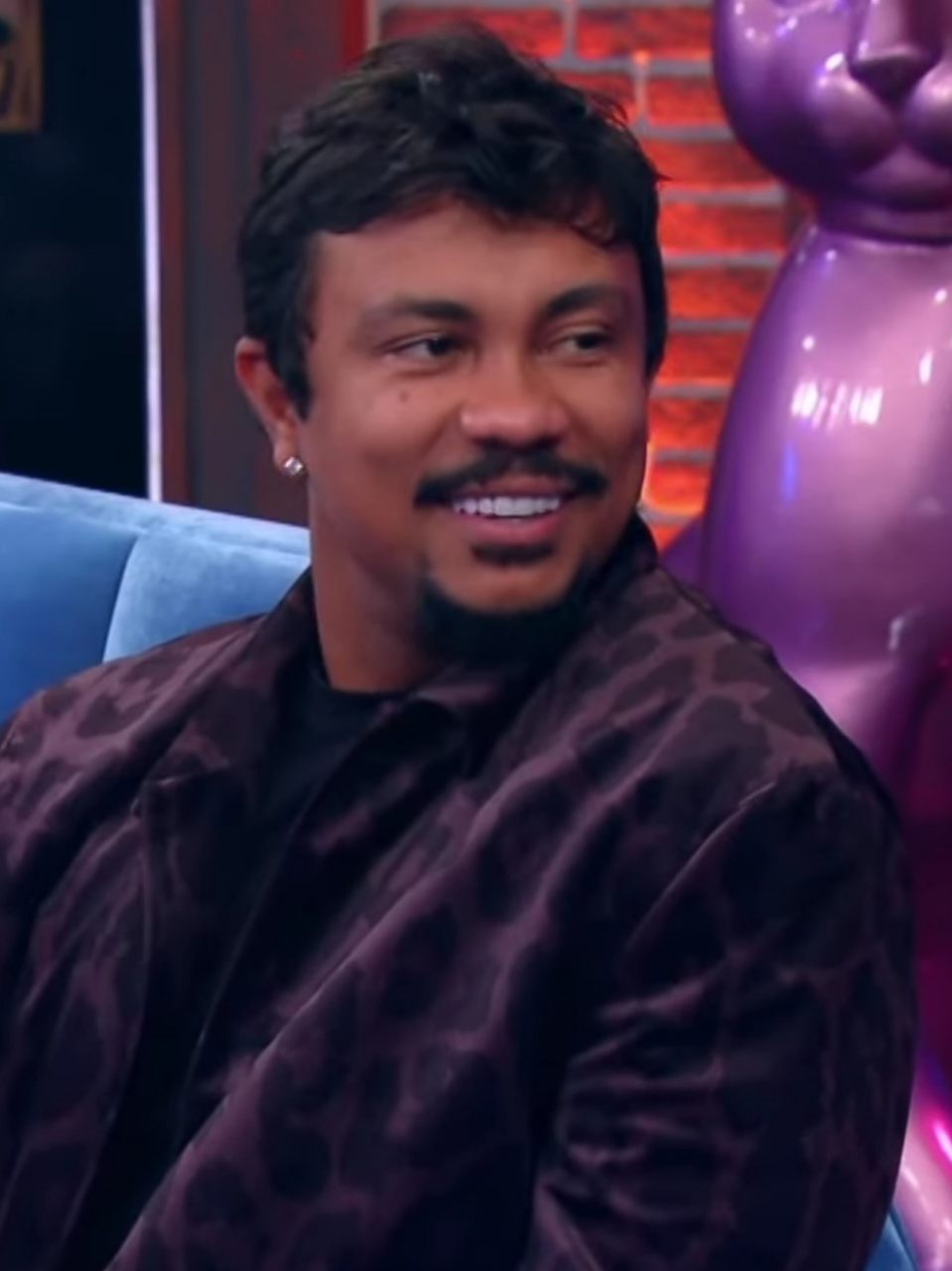
- Xamã in 2024
- Born: Geizon Carlos da Cruz Fernandes; 30 October 1989 (age 37); Rio de Janeiro, Brazil
- Occupations: Rapper; singer; poet; actor
- Years active: 2016–present
- Children: 1
- Musical career
- Genres: Hip hop; trap
- Instruments: Vocals

Geizon Carlos da Cruz Fernandes (born 30 October 1989), better known by his artistic name Xamã, is a Brazilian rapper, singer, poet and actor. He has released several successful rap albums, with strong sales and online streams, since the 2010s. He later also began a career in acting, appearing in telenovelas such as Amor de Mãe and Renascer. He also participated in The Masked Singer Brasil, coming in 3rd place. He has already won a Latin Grammy and was nominated for awards in the BET Hip Hop Awards, the MTV MIAW Awards Brazil, the MTV Europe Music Awards, and for the Multishow Brazilian Music Award.

== Biography ==
=== Musical career ===
Xamã began his musical career in 2016, writing rhymes. He would participate in rap battles and in local rap collectives such as Cartel MCs and 1kilo. He wrote his first song while working as a peanut vendor, with his occupation being the inspiration for the song. He has since released four albums: Pecado Capital (2018), O Iluminado (2019), Zodíaco (2020) and O Último Romântico Online (2023). With Zodíaco, all the song titles have a hidden meaning. The best-performing song in the album was "Leão", with more than 45 million views. He considers the album his most important work to date. The album as a whole became a great success, and included as guest artists Agnes Nunes, Luísa Sonza, Marília Mendonça, and Gloria Groove. The album was produced by Portugal no Beat, Neo Beats and Dj Gustah.

His first hit song was "Luxúria", with more than 80 million views on YouTube, as well as having the guest participation of fellow rapper Matuê. It was produced by NeoBeats, a close friend of Xamã since the start of his career. The song is part of his 2018 album Pecado Capital. The album cover for Pecado Capital is based on one of the most famous scenes of The Shining, when Jack Nicholson breaks through a door with an axe and peers through the hole.

The song "Malvadão 3", with Gustah and Neo Beats, hit number 1 in Brazil and in the top 48 in the world on Spotify on 31 December 2021. It was nominated for the "Best International Flow" by BET Hip Hop Awards, being the only Brazilian nominated that year. Little Simz of the United Kingdom ultimately won the award. "Malvadão 3" also earned Xamã seven nominations for the MTV Millennial Awards 2021.

In 2019, he performed at Rock in Rio, with him, in addition to his music, also singing hit songs from the band Charlie Brown Jr. He later performed at 2022 MTV MIAW Awards Brazil. In August 2023, he collaborated with Gabriel o Pensador and Lulu Santos for the song "Cachimbo da Paz 2".

=== Acting career ===
Xamã also has started a career in acting, leading to him starring in the TV Globo telenovela Justiça 2, which was nominated for an International Emmy. He starred opposite Nanda Costa. Prior to officially beginning his acting career, he had also shot short horror films in his spare time.

In 2023, he took part in The Masked Singer Brasil, disguised as a rooster. He earned third place, singing "Only You" by The Platters in the final.

Later on in January 2024, Xamã became part of the cast for the remake of the telenovela Renascer. He will play Damião, originally played by Jackson Antunes. His character will be romantically linked to Eliana, played by Sophie Charlotte. He also made his film debut in 2024 with the film O Maníaco do Parque, playing the role of Nivaldo. This was followed by playing the role of Sapinho in Cinco Tipos de Medo.

== Personal life ==
Xamã was born in 1989 in Rio de Janeiro and raised in the neighborhood of Sepetiba. He had previously studied law at university while also working as a street vendor. He has been in relationships with Gkay and Luísa Sonza. As of 2022, he is dating model Natasha Hoffemann, with whom he has a daughter, Akasha.

== Discography ==
- Pecado Capital (2018)
- O Iluminado (2019)
- Zodíaco (2020)
- O Último Romântico Online (2023)

== Filmography ==
=== Television ===
Year	Title	Role	Note
2019–2020	Amor de Mãe	Phanton Chagas	
2022	Travessia	Himself	Episodes: "12 de outubro" and "20 de outubro"
2023	The Masked Singer Brasil	Participant	Season 3
2024	Renascer	Damião Cunha	
2024	Justiça 2	Naldo "Naldinho"	
2025	Os Donos do Jogo	Búfalo	
2025	Três Graças	Breno Barbosa "Bagdá"	

=== Film ===
Year	Title	Role	Notes
2019	Segura Malandro	Xamã	Short-film
2024	O Maníaco do Parque	Nivaldo	
2025	Cinco Tipos de Medo	Sapinho	

== Awards and nominations ==
Year	Award	Category	Nomination	Result	Ref.
2020	2020 MTV MIAW Awards Brazil	Best Video Made in Home	De Novo	Nominated	
2020	2020 MTV MIAW Awards Brazil	Beat BR	Xamã	Nominated	
2021	2021 BET Hip Hop Awards	Best International Flow	Xamã	Nominated	
2021	MTV Millennial Awards 2021	Album or EP of the Year	Zodíaco	Nominated	
2021	MTV Millennial Awards 2021	Musical Artist	Xamã	Nominated	
2021	MTV Millennial Awards 2021	Style of the Year	Xamã	Nominated	
2021	MTV Millennial Awards 2021	National Feat.	"Deixa de Onda" (with Dennis DJ and Ludmilla) and "Leão" (with Marília Mendonça)	Nominated	
2021	MTV Millennial Awards 2021	Anthem of the year	"Deixa de Onda" (with Dennis DJ and Ludmilla)	Nominated	
2021	2021 Multishow Brazilian Music Award	Hit of the Year	"Deixa de Onda" (with Dennis DJ and Ludmilla)	Nominated	
2022	2022 MTV Europe Music Awards	Best Brazilian Act	Xamã	Nominated	
2022	2022 Multishow Brazilian Music Award	Song of the Year	"Malvadão 3"	Nominated	
2022	2022 Multishow Brazilian Music Award	Hit of the Year	"Malvadão 3"	Nominated	
