= Jussara Freire =

Brazilian actress

Jussara Rocha Freire
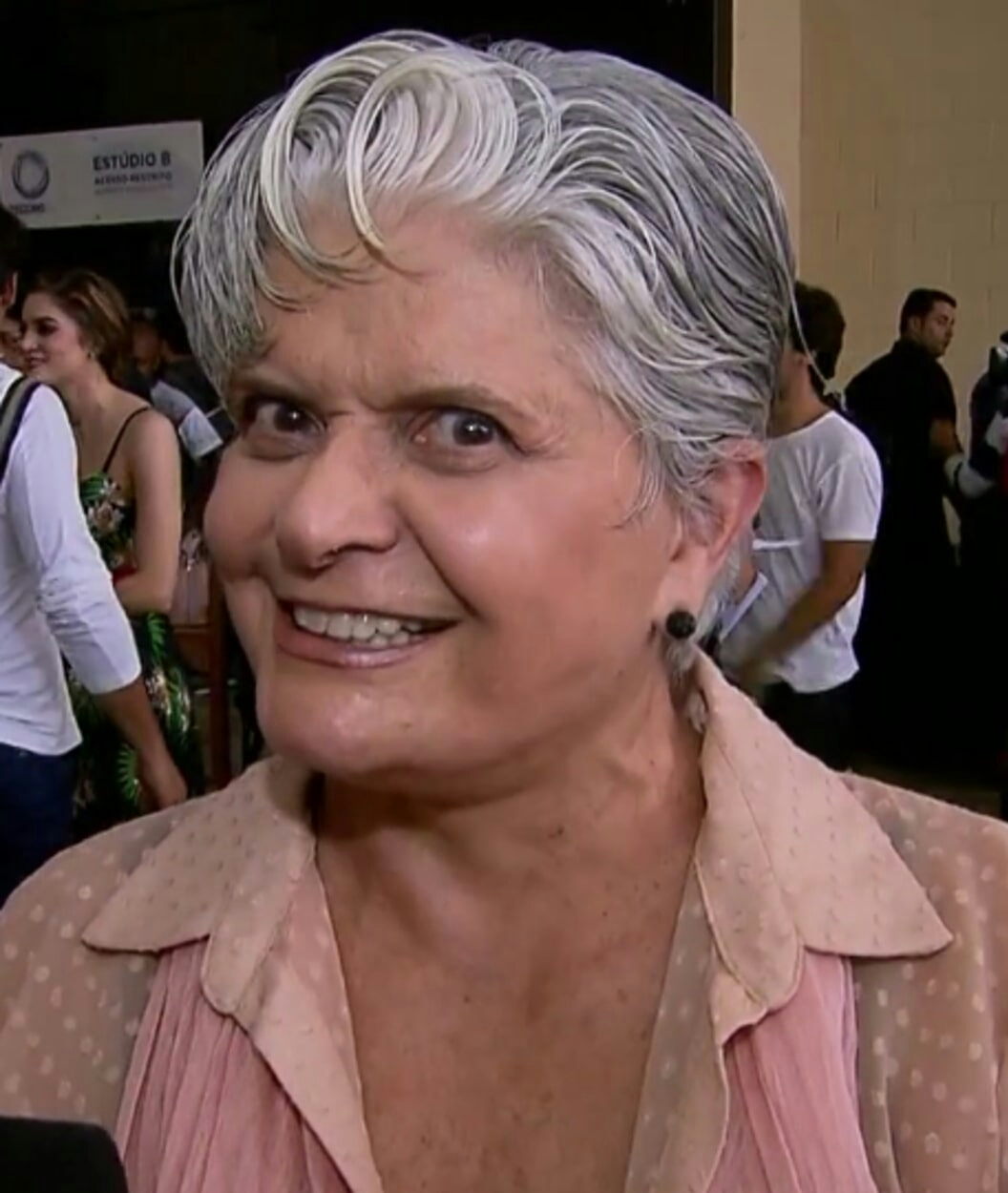
- Jussara Freire during an interview, in 2016
- Born: February 8, 1951 (age 75); Campo Grande, Brazil
- Occupation: Actress
- Spouses: Ednaldo Freire (m. 1970; div. 1993) Marcos Caruso (m. 1974; div. 1994)
- Children: Mari Caruso; Caetano Caruso

Jussara Freire (Campo Grande, February 8, 1951) is a Brazilian actress.

== Career ==
She began her career in the 1970s, gaining prominence in telenovelas such as Os Inocentes (1974), Éramos Seis (1977), and O Direito de Nascer (1978). She established herself as a major figure in Brazilian television drama, eventually becoming a highly acclaimed actress thanks to her performance in the telenovela Pantanal (1990); this role earned her both critical and public recognition, as well as Best Actress awards at the Troféu Imprensa and the APCA Awards APCA Awards. Other notable works include the telenovelas A Barba-Azul (1974), Amazônia (1991), Coração de Estudante (2002), Cabocla (2004), Belíssima (2005), and Apocalipse (2017).
