= Renascer (2024 TV series) =

- Genre: Telenovela
- Based on: Renascer by Benedito Ruy Barbosa
- Developed by: Bruno Luperi
- Directed by: Gustavo Fernandez
- Starring: Marcos Palmeira; Theresa Fonseca; Juan Paiva; Giullia Buscacio; Marcelo Mello Jr.; Rodrigo Simas; Sophie Charlotte; Vladimir Brichta
- Theme music composer: Ivan Lins; Vítor Martins
- Opening theme: "Lua Soberana" by Luedji Luna ft. Xênia França
- Country of origin: Brazil
- Original language: Portuguese
- No. of seasons: 1
- No. of episodes: 197

Production
- Producers: Betina Paulon; Bruna Ferreira
- Editors: Fabricio Ferreira; Elaine Stopatto; Claudio Ferri; Patric Torres; Francine Choeri; Murilo Grubert; Fernando Marcolini; João Gomes
- Production company: Estúdios Globo

Original release
- Network: TV Globo
- Release: 22 January – 6 September 2024

Renascer (English: Rebirth) is a Brazilian telenovela produced and broadcast by TV Globo. It aired from 22 January 2024 to 6 September 2024. The telenovela is based on the 1993 telenovela of the same name, created by Benedito Ruy Barbosa. Developed by Bruno Luperi, it is directed by Walter Carvalho, Alexandre Macedo, Ricardo França and Mariana Betti. The general direction is by Pedro Peregrino and the artistic direction is by Gustavo Fernandez.

It stars Marcos Palmeira, Theresa Fonseca, Juan Paiva, Giullia Buscacio, Marcelo Mello Jr., Rodrigo Simas, Sophie Charlotte and Vladimir Brichta.

== Plot ==
In the past, upon arriving in the cocoa-growing region of rural Ilhéus, Bahia, José Inocêncio planted his machete at the foot of a leafy jequitibá tree, establishing a pact with it to have his "body protected". With this and the support of his faithful companion, Inácia, he survived assassination attempts by the powerful colonels of the time, Firmino and Belarmino, and, over the years, became a major cocoa producer, becoming known as a mythical figure in the region, both because of the pact with the jequitibá and the protection of the little devil he carries with him in a bottle. But no pact could help José Inocêncio in the death of his great love, Maria Santa, after the birth of the couple's fourth child, João Pedro. Due to this loss, José Inocêncio becomes a depressed man and cruelly rejects his youngest son, who ends up in the care of Deocleciano and Morena, dependents on the colonel's farm. While Inocêncio's three older sons, José Augusto, José Bento and José Venâncio are sent to study in the state capital, João Pedro grows up learning the cocoa trade from his father, but without his affection.

In the present day, João Pedro meets the mysterious Mariana at the brothel of Jacutinga, and, wanting to emulate his father's love story, who also took in Maria Santa after she was abandoned at the brothel, decides to bring her to live on the farm. Mariana is, in fact, the granddaughter of Colonel Belarmino, who was mysteriously murdered in the past and whose lands were bought by Inocêncio. Initially, she seeks revenge, but is soon surprised to develop feelings for Inocêncio, the same person she blames for the tragedy that befell her family. The love triangle intensifies the tension between father and son, which increases further when Sandra, daughter of Colonel Egídio, heir to Colonel Firmino and Inocêncio's greatest rival in the present day, becomes involved with João Pedro, reigniting the war between the families.

== Cast ==
=== Main ===
- Marcos Palmeira as José Inocêncio "Zé Inocêncio / Painho"
  - Humberto Carrão as Young José Inocêncio
- Juan Paiva as João Pedro Inocêncio
  - Caique Ivo as Child João Pedro
- Theresa Fonseca as Mariana Paiva Ferreira
- Sophie Charlotte as Eliana Vieira
- Vladimir Brichta as Coronel Egídio Coutinho
  - Guilherme Brumatti as Young Egídio
- Giullia Buscacio as Sandra Martinez Coutinho
- Rodrigo Simas as José Venâncio Inocêncio
- Marcelo Mello Jr. as José Bento Inocêncio
- Renan Monteiro as José Augusto Inocêncio "Guto
  - Davi Altino as Child José Augusto
- Gabriela Medeiros as Isabela Carvalho "Buba"
- Camila Morgado as Iolanda Martinez Coutinho "Dona Patroa"
- Irandhir Santos as Sebastião de Pádua "Tião Galinha"
- Alice Carvalho as Joana de Pádua "Joaninha"
- Jackson Antunes as Deocleciano Barbosa
  - Adanilo as Young Deocleciano
- Ana Cecília Costa as Morena de Souza Barbosa
  - Uiliana Lima as Young Morena
- Edvana Carvalho as Inácia de Jesus Galvão
- Xamã as Damião Cunha
- Matheus Nachtergaele as Norberto dos Reis
- Chico Díaz as Padre Santo
- Almir Sater as Turco Rachid
  - Gabriel Sater as Young Turco Rachid
- Samantha Jones as Zinha Jupará
- Lívia Silva as Teresa Cristina Guedes "Teca"
- Mell Muzzillo as Rita de Cássia de Jesus Galvão "Ritinha"
- Breno da Matta as Pastor Lívio
- Eli Ferreira as Luciana Matos "Professorinha Lu"
- Juliane Araújo as Valquíria Pereira "Kika"
- Pedro Neschling as Eriberto Ramos "Beto"
- Osvaldo Mil as Marçal
- Juan Queiroz as Pitoco
- Gabriel Lima da Silva as Neno
- José Duboc as Eduardo "Du"
- Manuela Ofredi as Manu
- Pedro Cupido as Pedro

=== Guest stars ===
- Duda Santos as Maria Santa Inocêncio "Santinha"
- Juliana Paes as Jacutinga de Arrabal
- Malu Mader as Aurora Guimarães
- Lucy Alves as Lilith
- Antônio Calloni as Coronel Belarmino Ferreira
- Enrique Díaz as Firmino Coutinho "Coronel Pica-Pau"
- Maria Fernanda Cândido as Cândida Gouveia
- Fábio Lago as Venâncio "Boi"
- Evaldo Macarrão as Jupará
- Quitéria Kelly as Helena Ferreira "Nena"
- Belize Pombal as Quitéria
- Julia Lemos as Flor Jupará
- Flávia Barros as Juliete
- Mac Suara as Seu Francisco Cunha "Chico"
- Roney Villela as Clementino
- Gabriela Loran as Maitê
- Bianca Dellafancy as Jorge/Janaína
- Galba Gogóia as Natasha
- Gabriella Cristina as Marianinha
- Malu Galli as Meire Carvalho
- Guilherme Fontes as Humberto Carvalho
- Miguel Rômulo as Décio
- Edmilson Barros as Delegate Nórcia
- Maria Zenayde as Dalva
- Alexandre Damascena as Piolho
- Alan Pellegrino as Deliveryman Casas Bahia

== Ratings ==
Season	Episodes	First aired		Last aired		Avg. viewers (points)
Season	Episodes	Date	Viewers (points)	Date	Viewers (points)	Avg. viewers (points)
1	197	22 January 2024	25.9	6 September 2024	27.1	25.5
