= Renascer (1993 TV series) =

- Created by: Benedito Ruy Barbosa
- Directed by: Luiz Fernando Carvalho
- Starring: Antônio Fagundes; Adriana Esteves; Marcos Palmeira; Tarcísio Filho; Marco Ricca; Taumaturgo Ferreira; Luciana Braga; Maria Luísa Mendonça; Patrícia Pillar; Herson Capri; Osmar Prado; Tereza Seiblitz; Jackson Costa; Chica Xavier; Roberto Bonfim; Jackson Antunes see more
- Music by: Ivan Lins; Vítor Martins; Aldir Blanc
- Opening theme: Confins by Batacotô and Ivan Lins
- Ending theme: Confins by Batacotô and Ivan Lins
- Country of origin: Brazil
- Original language: Portuguese
- No. of episodes: 216

Production
- Production location: Brazil
- Running time: 75 minutes
- Production company: Central Globo de Produção

Original release
- Network: Rede Globo
- Release: 8 March – 14 November 1993

Related
- Renascer (2024 TV series)

Renascer (English: To be reborn) is a Brazilian telenovela produced and broadcast by TV Globo in 1993, written by Benedito Ruy Barbosa and directed by Luiz Fernando Carvalho.

== Cast ==
Actor/Actress	Character
Antônio Fagundes	José Inocêncio (Zé Inocêncio)
Adriana Esteves	Mariana
Marcos Palmeira	João Pedro Inocêncio
Patrícia Pillar	Eliana Vieira
Herson Capri	Teodoro Gouveia
Luciana Braga	Sandra Gouveia Martinez
Tarcísio Filho	Zé Bento (José Bento Inocêncio)
Maria Luísa Mendonça	Buba (Alcides)
Marco Ricca	Zé Augusto (José Augusto Inocêncio)
Regina Dourado	Morena
Roberto Bonfim	Deocleciano
Osmar Prado	Tião Galinha
Chica Xavier	Inácia de Jesus Galvão
Tereza Seiblitz	Joaninha (Joana)
Paloma Duarte	Teca (Maria Tereza)
Jackson Antunes	Damião
Leila Lopes	Lu
Cosme dos Santos	Zinho Jupará
Luiz Carlos Arutin	Rachid
Nelson Xavier	Norberto
Isabel Fillardis	Ritinha (Rita de Cássia)
Jackson Costa	Padre Lívio
Eliane Giardini	Dona Patroa (Iolanda Martinez)
Ruy Rezende	Bernardo
Grande Otelo	Seu Francisco Galvão
Mara Carvalho	Aurora
Oberdan Júnior	Pitoco
Cassiano Carneiro	Neno
Cecil Thiré	Delegado Olavo
Clementino Kelé	Jarbas
Kadu Moliterno	Rafael
Íris Nascimento	Lourdinha
Rita Santana	Flor
Lamartine Ferreira	Marcelo
Joffre Soares	Padre Santo
José de Abreu	Egberto Ramos
Cláudia Lira	Valquíria Pereira (Kika)
Taumaturgo Ferreira	Zé Venâncio (José Venâncio Inocêncio)
Fernanda Montenegro	Jacutinga

=== First phase ===
Actor/Actress	Character
Leonardo Vieira	Zé Inocêncio (young)
Patrícia França	Maria Santa
José Wilker	Belarmino
Solange Couto	Inácia (young)
Gésio Amadeu	Jupará
Cacá Carvalho	Venâncio
Ana Lúcia Torre	Quitéria
Leonardo Brício	Diocleciano (young)
Cyria Coentro	Morena (young)
Betty Erthal	Nena
Daniele Rodrigues	Marianinha (young)
Pablo Sobral	João Pedro (child)
Toninho da Cruz	Zinho Jupará (child)
Bertrand Duarte	Felipe

== Awards ==
Troféu APCA (1993)

- Best Telenovela
- Best Actor - Antônio Fagundes
- Best Supporting Actor - Osmar Prado
- Best Supporting Actress - Regina Dourado
- Male revelation - Jackson Antunes

Troféu Imprensa (1993)

- Best Telenovela
- Best Actor - Antônio Fagundes
- Revelation of the Year - Jackson Antunes
