= List of Malhação cast members =

Below is a list of cast members on the Brazilian television series Malhação.

== Season 1 ==
Interpreter	Character
Danton Mello	Héricles Barreto
Juliana Martins	Isabella Bittencourt "Bella"
Luigi Baricelli	Romão Marques Macieira
Carolina Dieckmann	Juliana Siqueira "Juli"
Sílvia Pfeifer	Paula Pratta
Mário Gomes	Roberto
Cláudio Heinrich	Eduardo Siqueira "Dado"
Fernanda Rodrigues	Luiza Pratta Gonzalez
Ana Paula Tabalipa	Tainá Rebouças
André Marques	Alexandre Ferreira "Mocotó"
Daniela Pessoa	Magali
Ademir Zanyor	Israel da Conceição
Nair Bello	Olga Pratta
John Herbert	Nabucodonosor Pereira "Nabuco"
Bruno de Lucca	Fábio Gonzalez Filho "Fabinho"
Fabiano Miranda	Bróduei Washington do Nascimento Jr
Dill Costa	Maria Candelária Felipe Santiago
Pablo Uranga	Léo

=== Special appearances ===
Interpreter	Character
Alexandra Marzo	Suzy
Alexandra Richter	Student
Anna Cotrim	Solange
Antônio Pedro	José Joaquim "Conde Fortuna"
Beto Simas	Herman
Bruno Giordano	Police officer
Carla Faour	Babysitter
Carla Regina	Jane
Cláudia Lira	Carla
Daniel Dantas	Marcos Guimarães
Danielle Winits	Melissa Brown
Eduardo Caldas	Lucas Figueira Bragança
Evandro Mesquita	Ivan Reis "Jacaré"
Fábio Junqueira	Márcio Bragança
Fábio Villa Verde	Afonso César de Oliveira Neto
Felipe Martins	Mickey
Flávia Bonato	Rafaela Guimarães "Rafa"
Giovanna Gold	Vera Moraes
Gisele Fraga	Lola Veiga
Guilherme Fontes	Rei Star
Guilherme Piva	Melchior "Merreca"
João Carlos Barroso	José França
João Velho	Child Eduardo Siqueira Júnior "Dado"
Júlio Levy	Adroaldo "Cachorrão"
Lúcia Alves	Tulê Berná
Luciana Vendramini	Paula Barreiro "Paulinha"
Ludmila Dayer	Tati
Lulu Santos	Himself
Lupe Gigliotti	Arlete
Mari Alexandre	Model
Maurício Manieri	Himself
Mylla Christie	Alva/Branca
Myrian Rios	Tereza
Murilo Rosa	Jurandir
Ney Santanna	Hamilton Rebouças
Nico Puig	Raul "Bad Boy"
Nina de Pádua	Vivian Nogutt
Nívea Maria	Antônia Figueira Bragança
Oswaldo Loureiro	Milton Barreiro
Otávio Müller	Cruzeirinho
Patrícia de Sabrit	Micaela Batista Palma
Patrícia Marx	Herself
Paulo Carvalho	Cássio
Paulo Reis	Antenor
Petrônio Gontijo	Greg
Renata Castro Barbosa	Girl
Rodrigo Penna	Tomás G.
Rogério Cardoso	Flávio Silvestre
Suzana Abranches	Bia
Suzana Faini	Hilda Vargas
Tamara Taxman	Eudóxia
Thelma Reston	Witch mother-in-law
Totia Meireles	Elaine de Souza da Silva

== Season 2 ==
Interpreter	Character
Fernanda Rodrigues	Luiza Pratta Gonzalez
Cláudio Heinrich	Eduardo Kleber Siqueira Júnior "Dado"
Camila Pitanga	Alexandra Nogueira Bittencourt "Alex"
Luigi Baricelli	Romão Marques Macieira
Susana Werner	Mariana Silveira
Danton Mello	Héricles Barreto
André Marques	Alexandre Ferreira "Mocotó"
André Marques	Gaudêncio Ferreira "Rabada"
André Marques	Celso Ferreira
André Marques	Dobradinha
Samantha Dalsoglio	Joana Ferraz
Íris Bustamante	Fernanda Lopes Werter
Daniela Pessoa	Magali
Luiza Curvo	Jade Margaret Shue
Bruno de Luca	Fábio Gonzalez Filho
Marcos Frota	Hugo Silveira
Bianca Byington	Dóris Simões de Andrade
John Herbert	Nabucodonosor Pereira "Nabuco"
Beto Simas	Júlio Almeida dos Santos Hermann
Renata Fronzi	Jasmim Silveira
Fred Mayrink	Farinha
Rodrigo Drippê	Pedro
Dill Costa	Maria Candelária Felipe Santiago
Fabiano Miranda	Bróduei Washington do Nascimento Jr
Lucas Margutti	Paulista

=== Special appearances ===
Interpreter	Character
Ademir Zanyor	Israel da Conceição
Adriano Reys	Doctor Ferraz
Alanis Morissette	Herself
Ana Luiza Castro	Lavínia Campelo
Ana Paula Guimarães	Joana "Nani"
Ana Paula Tabalipa	Tainá Rebouças Pinheiro
Andréa Murucci	Vera "Verinha Vendaval"
Bia Montez	Fátima
Bruno Padilha	Mestre Carlinhos
Caíque Loyola	Jorge
Carlos Sato	Akira
Cássia Linhares	Ciça
Castro Gonzaga	Santa Claus
Christine Fernandes	Maribel Lamarca
Copacabana Beat	Themselves
Danton Jardim	Renato Garcia Molina
Diogo Albuquerque	Mateus Pereira
Elizângela	Izildete Ferraz "Zizi"
Fabiano Nogueira	Pedrão
Fernando José	Monsieur Bistrô
Francisco Milani	Bartholomeu Simões de Andrade Silveira
Gutti Fraga	Valdomiro
Jarcko Paes	Beto
Jonas Torres	Severino "Júnior"
José Augusto Branco	Nogueira
Juliana Martins	Isabella Bittencourt "Bella"
Katia Bronstein	Lila Shue
Manitou Felipe	Serginho Rota
Márcio Ehrlich	Anselmo
Marcelo Souto Maior	Student
Maria Ribeiro	Denise
Mateus Carrieri	Márcio Goldman
Mônica Areal	Tininha
Nico Puig	Raul "Bad Boy"
Nizo Neto	Electrician
Pedro Brício	Vinícius
Renata Ghelli	Ruth
Ricardo Duque	Student
Ricardo Petraglia	Carlos
Sandra Hansen	Woman
Sandro Rocha	Marcos
Silveirinha	Francisco
Tatyane Goulart	Maria de Fátima Rodrigues
Terra Samba	Themselves
Thierry Figueira	Gabriel
Vanessa Pascale	Márcia Nascimento
Xuxa Lopes	Laura Marques Macieira

== Season 3 ==
in opening order

Interpreter	Character
André Marques	Alexandre Ferreira "Mocotó"
Bruno De Luca	Fábio Gonzalez Filho "Fabinho"
Cláudio Heinrich	Eduardo Kleber Siqueira Junior "Dado"
Samantha Dalsoglio	Joana Ferraz
Bianca Byington	Dóris Simões de Andrade
John Herbert	Nabucodonosor Pereira "Nabuco"
Juliana Knust	Laura
Karina Barum	Débora
Luana Piovani	Patrícia Matos "Lorão"
Norton Nascimento	Fausto Ferraz
Pedro Vasconcelos	Victor Viana "Vudu"
Raquel Nunes	Pamela Rodrigues "Pam"
Renata Mór	Juliana
Talita Castro	Maria Madureira
Thaís Fersoza	Ângela da Silva
Luigi Baricelli	Romão Marques Macieira
Lucinha Lins	Bárbara Maldonado
Fabiano Miranda	Bróduei Washington do Nascimento Jr
Dill Costa	Maria Candelária Felipe Santiago
Francisco Cuoco	Orestes Maldonado

=== Special appearances ===
Interpreter	Character
Abrahão Farc	Nestor
Adriano Garib	Jailer
Alexandre Zacchia	Madureira
Ana Paula Guimarães	Joana "Nani"
André Gonçalves	Merreca
Andréa Guerra	Afrodite
Andréa Veiga	Célia
Ângelo Paes Leme	Nando
António Gonzalez	Rolando
Athirson	Himself
Beth Goulart	Lígia
Beto Carrero	Himself
Bianca Rinaldi	Úrsula
Bruce Gomlevsky	Waiter
Bruno Padilha	Xará
Caio Junqueira	Flávio "Flavinho"
Camila Pitanga	Alexandra Nogueira Bittencourt "Alex"
Carlinhos de Jesus	Himself
Carlos Bonow	Montanha
Carlos Sato	Akira
Carolina Dieckmann	Juliana Siqueira Pepper "Juli"
Carolina Pavanelli	Rafaela
Cléa Simões	Dona Quinha
Cristina Mullins	Andréia
Cristina Prochaska	Sílvia da Silva
Daniel Ávila	Hassan
Dany Bananinha	Teca
Dary Reis	Train conductor
Fábio Villa Verde	Pedro Ivo Macieira
Fernando Almeida	Franklin
Francisco Milani	Falcão
Guilherme Leme	Celso
Ilka Soares	Aurora
Ilya São Paulo	Barrão
Íris Nascimento	Verônica
Jon Bon Jovi	Himself
Jorge Botelho	Gabriel Pereira
Kadu Moliterno	Paulo da Silva
Karina Perez	Bianca Ferreira
Kiko Mascarenhas	Victor/Victória
Leila Lopes	Rosa Aparecida
Lina Fróes	Filomena Viana
Luciene Adami	Helena
Lúcio Mauro	Palhares
Márcio Kieling	Student
Marcos Pasquim	Milton
Mário Frias	Ivan Madureira
Mônica Carvalho	Naomi
Nildo Parente	Severo Madureira
Nívea Stelmann	Mônica Maldonado
Raul Gazolla	Marcel
Renata Fronzi	Jasmim Silveira
Renée de Vielmond	Lorena Saraiva
Rita Guedes	Luana
Roberta Cipriani	Maria Kátia
Roberta Índio do Brasil	Tati
Roberto Frota	Simões
Ronaldo	Roberto Lobo "Betinho"
Sandro Rocha	Pedro
Sérgio Abreu	Raimundo
Susana Werner	Mariana Silveira
Tássia Camargo	Aline
Tato Gabus Mendes	Eduardo Kleber Siqueira
Thiago Lacerda	Lucas Melo "Lula"
Thierry Figueira	Ladislau "Lau"
Waldir Gozzi	Alan
Walmor Chagas	William Longstreet
Yoná Magalhães	Elizabeth

== Season 4 ==
Interpreter	Character
Rodrigo Faro	Bruno Magalhães
Cássia Linhares	Alice Valadares
Caio Junqueira	Pedro Paulo Valadares "Puruca"
Jonas Torres	Beto
Juliana Baroni	Cláudia Bezerra "Cacau"
Daniele Valente	Flávia Ranieri
Luíza Mariani	Isadora Marques "Isa"
Mário Frias	Escova
Bruno Gradim	Thiago Barros "Barrão"
Aldri Anunciação	Nankim
Francisco Milani	Milton Ranieri
Totia Meireles	Dulce Magalhães
Jonas Bloch	Tarso Sacramento "Tatuí"
Ariel Coelho	Danilo Marques

=== Special appearances ===
Interpreter	Character
Adriana Matoso	Dani
Alexandre Barillari	Tadeu
Alexandre Barros	Himself
Andréa Faria	Luana
André Marques	Alexandre Ferreira "Mocotó"
André Valli	Josafá Bittencourt
Badalhoca	Himself
Beto Simas	Hugo
Bernard Rajzman	Himself
Bruno de Luca	Fábio Gonzalez Filho "Fabinho"
Caco Baresi	Ademir
Carlos Casagrande	Juan
Castrinho	Oscar
Catarina Abdala	Manu
Cecil Thiré	Henrique Otávio do Prado Mota "H.O."
Charlie Brown Jr.	Themselves
Cissa Guimarães	Teresa Bezerra
Companhia do Pagode	Themselves
Daniel Andrade	Formula One Pilot
Danielle Winits	Vicky
Erom Cordeiro	Ângelo
Juliana Paes	Student
Júnior	Himself
Lavínia Vlasak	Érica do Prado Mota
Lúcia Veríssimo	Cristine
Marcello Novaes	Paulinho Kelé
Márcio Garcia	Adriano Valente
Marcos Breda	Mestre Rava
Marcos Valle	Himself
Maria Ribeiro	Eva
Mariana Vaz	Inês
Marinara Costa	Beth
Mel Lisboa	Girl
Oswaldo Loureiro	Esmeraldino Sampaio
Pedro Paulo Rangel	Business man
Regininha Poltergeist	Girl
Ricardo Macchi	Rafael
Rita Guedes	Carla Tocker
Samara Felippo	Sabrina
Samuel Costa	Carlinhos "Gafanhoto"
Serguei	Himself
Ted Boy Marino	Teodoro Ranieri
Thaís Fersoza	Carla
Vera Mossa	Herself
Viviane Araújo	Girl
Zilka Salaberry	Woman

== Season 5 ==
First phase

Interpreter	Character
André Marques	Alexandre Ferreira "Mocotó"
Juliana Baroni	Cláudia Bezerra "Cacau"
Dani Valente	Flávia Ranieri
Bruno Gradim	Thiago Barros "Barrão"
Alexandre Barillari	Tadeu
Luíza Mariani	Isadora Marques
Bruno de Lucca	Fábio Gonzalez Filho "Fabinho"
Jonas Torres	Beto

Second phase

Interpreter	Character
André Marques	Alexandre Ferreira "Mocotó"
Juliana Baroni	Cláudia Bezerra "Cacau"
Thaís Fersoza	Carla Duncan "Ursa"
Edward Boggis	Caio
Luigi Baricelli	Romão Marques Macieira
Gisele Fraga	Priscila
Dani Valente	Flávia Ranieri
Bruno Gradim	Thiago Barros "Barrão"
Alexandre Barillari	Tadeu
Luíza Mariani	Isadora Marques
Natália Lage	Marina Ferreira
Gisele Policarpo	Eduarda Quaresma "Duda"
Bruno de Lucca	Fábio Gonzalez Filho
Jonas Torres	Beto
Maria Zilda Bethlem	Catarina da Silva Manhães
Stepan Nercessian	Petrucchio Ribeiro da Costa
Cláudia Alencar	Inês
Anderson Müller	Bermuda
Adriana Bombom	Julieta
Alexandre Frota	Robson
Fly	Tite
Carina Ignácio Ferreira	Carina
Téo Barossi	Téo

=== Special appearances ===
Interpreter	Character
Ademir Zanyor	Israel da Conceição
Alessandra Corrêa	Sandrinha
André Segatti	Drago
Bruno Garcia	Mário Zap
Caio Graco	Artur
Carlos Machado	Bené
Carolina Kasting	Sister Laila
Cássia Eller	Herself
Cissa Guimarães	Teresa Bezerra
Clarice Penna	Marcinha
Cláudio Heinrich	Eduardo Kleber Siqueira Júnior "Dado"
Cláudio Gabriel	Teacher
Cynthia Benini	Laura
Daniela Pessoa	Magali de Assis Albuquerque
Danton Mello	Héricles Barreto
Débora Falabella	Antônia
Dill Costa	Maria Candelária Felipe Santiago
É o Tchan	Themselves
Elaine Mickely	Sister Laura
Fat Family	Themselves
Fernanda Badauê	Sister Laís
Fernanda Souza	Themselves
Flávio Colatrello Jr.	Metraton
Fred Mayrink	Miguel "Guel"
Gustavo Haddad	Plínio
Jerusa Franco	Gabriela
Jonathan Nogueira	Rubens "Rubinho"
Jota Quest	Themselves
Júlia Melim	Luana
Juliana Garavatti	Tatiana "Taty"
Juliana Martins	Isabella Bittencourt "Bella"
Leonardo Vieira	Zeca
Liane Souza	Paula "Paulinha"
Luciano Szafir	Sérgio Garcia
Lúcio Mauro	Manoel Ferreira
Luís Antônio Gomes	Rafael "Rafa"
Marco Audino	Raul
Marco Mastronelli	Júlio/Anjeliel
Mariana Ximenes	Herself
Marilu Bueno	Ernestina
Marinara Costa	Milena
Maurício Branco	Ian
Mônica Carvalho	Verônica Paes
Natália França	Natália
Nelson Freitas	Antonio "Tony Tiger"
Paula Franco	Olívia
Pedro Brício	Himself
Pedro Vasconcelos	Victor Viana "Vudu"
Priscilla Campos	Fernanda
Rafaela Fischer	Bruna Saldanha
Raquel Nunes	Pâmela Rodrigues "Pam"
Rodrigo Drippe	Pedro
Rubens Caribé	Aranha
Sandra Barsotti	Leda Lúcia
Sérgio Vieira	Kim
Vavá	Chico Samba
Vera Zimmermann	Rachel
Yuri Jaimovich	Stalone

== Season 6 ==
Interpreter	Character
Priscila Fantin	Tatiana Almeida "Tati"
Mário Frias	Rodrigo Chaves
Samara Felippo	Érica Schmidt
Roger Gobeth	Alfredo Fernandes "Touro"
Daniel de Oliveira	Marcos Almeida "Marquinhos"
Natália Lage	Marina Granato Ferreira
Fernanda Souza	Maria Heloísa Pereira Vieira de Moura e Souza "Helô"
Robson Nunes	Sávio Santos
Giselle Policarpo	Eduarda Quaresma "Duda"
Márcio Kieling	Bernardo Crisântemo "Perereca"
Carolina Abranches	Maria Lúcia Buendía "Marilú"
Lilia Cabral	Claudia Gonzaga Almeida
Paulo Gorgulho	Rubem Almeida
Maria Padilha	Alberta Gonzaga
Giovanna Antonelli	Isabel Pasqualete "Isa"
Licurgo Spínola	Vitor Maia
Fernando Pavão	Gustavo Leal "Guto"
Nuno Leal Maia	Paulo Pasqualete
Felipe Camargo	Humberto "Beto"
Paula Newlands	Rosa
André Marques	Alexandre Ferreira "Mocotó"
Paulo Pompéia	Irandir Santos "Seu Santos"
Sílvia Poggetti	Maria Maravilha
Camilla Farias	Carolina Maia

=== Special appearances ===
Interpreter	Character
Mônica Torres	Valquíria Castro
Eloísa Mafalda	Antônia Castro
Milton Gonçalves	Leal Calabar
Raul Gazola	Ricardão
Bruno Padilha	André Falcão
Geovanna Tominaga	Letícia
Othon Bastos	João "Calota"
Ilva Niño	Yolanda
Renato Scarpin	Armando
Cosme dos Santos	Brochete
Petrônio Gontijo	Priest Alexandre
Nizo Neto	Penalva
Alexandre Zacchia	Carlão
Karine Teles	Karen
Mateus Rocha	Papa-Léguas
Fábio Saback	Ruan Batista
Lúcio Andrey	Gilson
Miguel Oniga	Teacher Lima

== Season 7 ==
Interpreter	Character
Fábio Azevedo	Marcelo Malta
Ludmila Dayer	Joana Vasconcelos Carneiro
Fernanda Nobre	Beatriz Albuquerque Vasconcelos "Bia"
Márcio Kieling	Bernardo Crisântemo "Perereca"
Priscila Fantin	Tatiana Almeida "Tati"
Mário Frias	Rodrigo Chaves
Samara Felippo	Érica Schmidt
Roger Gobeth	Alfredo Fernandes "Touro"
Fernanda Souza	Heloísa Castro "Helô"
Sérgio Hondjakoff	Artur Malta "Cabeção"
Aisha Jambo	Naomi Ramos
Robson Nunes	Sávio Santos
Daniel de Oliveira	Marcos Almeida "Marquinhos"
Natália Lage	Marina Granato Ferreira de Almeida
Giselle Policarpo	Eduarda Quaresma "Duda"
Rômulo Simões	Alessandro Schimidt "Alemão"
Giuseppe Oristânio	Afonso Malta
Giselle Tigre	Linda Albuquerque
Guilherme Leme	Jorge Vasconcelos
Denise Del Vecchio	Iolanda Albuquerque "Ioiô"
Nuno Leal Maia	Paulo Pasqualete
Fernando Pavão	Gustavo Leal "Guto"
Licurgo Spínola	Vitor Maia
Antônio Grassi	João Mendes "Jalecão"
Paulo Pompéia	Irandir Santos "Seu Santos"
Sílvia Poggetti	Maria Maravilha
Helder Agostini	Fernando Malta "FM /Fernandinho"
Luã Ubacker	Arnaldo Viegas "AM / Arnaldinho"

=== Special appearances ===
Interpreter	Character
José Augusto Branco	Borges
Erik Marmo	Sócrates Coelho "Só"
Gabriel Gracindo	Carlos Lins
Lília Cabral	Claudia Almeida
Paulo Gorgulho	Rubem Almeida
André De Biase	Vinícius Lemos
Carlos Eduardo Dolabella	Marco Antônio Fernandes
Tânia Bondezan	Raquel Fernandes
Débora Duarte	Leila Schmidt
Cláudio Lins	Antônio
Danni Suzuki	Lúcia
Geovanna Tominaga	Letícia
Daniel Ávila	Bruno Simões
Flávia Bonato	Luciana
Mariana Dubois	Fabiana
Mila Moreira	Úrsula
Helena Fernandes	Tânia
Jayme Periard	Praxedes
Daniel Andrade	José Bittencourt "Zezinho"
Marcelo Novaes	Felipe Caldas
Fernando Caruso	Théo "Sinistro"
Ricardo Duque	Cleiton
Java Mayan	Emerson Souza
Betina Viany	Madalena "Madá"
Luis Otávio	Bilico
Marcelo Cavalcanti	Bruno Marques "Bujão"
Carolina Abranches	Marilu
Miguel Oniga	Lima
Paula Newlands	Rosa
Luiz André Alvim	Lucas
Miguel Thiré	Gian Santos "Jacaré"
Bruno Padilha	André Falcão
Rafaela Mandelli	Fernanda Lemos "Nanda"
Iran Malfitano	Guilherme Ferreira "Gui"
Max Fercondini	Leonardo Ferreira "Léo"

== Season 8 ==
Interpreter	Character
Rafaela Mandelli	Fernanda Lemos "Nanda"
Iran Malfitano	Guilherme Ferreira "Gui"
Bianca Castanho	Valéria Oliveira "Val"
Max Fercondini	Leonardo Ferreira "Léo"
Fernanda Nobre	Beatriz Albuquerque "Bia"
Gisele Frade	Adriana Spinelli "Drica"
Dado Dolabella	Robson Silveira Sampaio
Renata Dominguez	Solene Ribeiro da Silva "Sol"
Sérgio Abreu	Alberto Bandini "Beto"
Sidney Sampaio	Daniel Bittencourt "Dani"
Fernanda Souza	Heloísa Castro "Helô"
Sérgio Hondjakoff	Arthur Malta Reymond Lopes "Cabeção"
Aisha Jambo	Naomi Ramos
Eric Muller	Manoel Gonçalves "Farofa"
Rômulo Simões	Alessandro Schimidt "Alemão"
Renata Mattos	Estela Mello
Lucélia Santos	Jackeline Lemos "Jackie"
André De Biase	Vinicius Lemos
Tato Gabus Mendes	Renato Ferreira
Bia Seidl	Vera Ferreira
Giuseppe Oristanio	Afonso Malta Reymond Lopes
Giselle Tigre	Linda Albuquerque Malta
Fernando Pavão	Gustavo Leal "Guto"
Antônio Grassi	João Mendes "Jalecão"
Charles Paraventi	Afrânio
Bia Montez	Vilma Ribeiro da Silva
Roger Gobeth	Alfredo Fernandes "Touro"
Ricardo Kosovski	Caio Magalhães
Helder Agostini	Fernando Malta Reymond Lopes "Fernandinho"
Juliana Lohmann	Gabriela Ferreira "Gabi"

=== Special appearances ===
Interpreter	Character
Samara Felippo	Érica Schimidt
Maytê Piragibe	Lili
Bruno Ferrari	Fabio
Jerry Adriani	Bruno
Márcio Kieling	Bernardo Crisântemo "Perereca"
João Carlos Barroso	Almeidinha
Rita Guedes	Flávia
Eliete Cigarini	Helena
Thiago de Los Reyes	Marquinho
Ângela Figueiredo	Solange
André Barros	Rafael
Dirce Migliaccio	Ângela
Regina Remencius	Marilise
Paulo Betti	Ricardo
Guilherme Leme	Jorge Vasconcelos
Alexia Dechamps	Lorena
Dandara Guerra	Marcela
Miguel Nader	Duplex
Newton Martins	Gonçalves
Clara Garcia	Kátia
Andréa Leal	Luciana
Nathalie Meg	Manuela
Marcela Muniz	Delegate
Paulo Gonçalves	Gonçalves
Babu Santana	José "Zé"
Jorge Dória	Carmello Bandini
Luiz Nicolau	Producer
Paula Newlands	Rosa
Herbert Richers Jr.	Tony
Tatiana Muniz	Melissa "Mel"
Kadu Moliterno	César Rodrigues
Juliana Silveira	Julia Miranda
Henri Castelli	Pedro Rodrigues

== Season 9 ==
Interpreter	Character
Juliana Silveira	Júlia Miranda "Bárbara"
Henri Castelli	Pedro Rodrigues
Bárbara Borges	Thaíssa Bandiolli "Falsa Bárbara"
Mariana Hein	Isabel Mendes "Bebel"
Miguel Thiré	Charles Alencastro Júnior
Fernanda Nobre	Beatriz Albuquerque Vasconcelos "Bia"
Cauã Reymond	Maurício Terra "Maumau"
Gisele Frade	Adriana Spinelli "Drica"
Tiago Armani	Ricardo Miranda
Renata Dominguez	Solene Ribeiro da Silva "Sol"
Sérgio Abreu	Alberto Bandini "Beto"
Rafaela Mandelli	Fernanda Lemos "Nanda"
Iran Malfitano	Guilherme Ferreira "Gui"
Aisha Jambo	Naomí Ramos
Eric Muller	Manoel Gonçalves "Farofa"
Sérgio Hondjakoff	Arthur Malta Reymond Lopes "Cabeção"
Sidney Sampaio	Daniel Bittencourt "Dani"
Rômulo Simões	Alessandro Schimidt "Alemão"
Lu Grimaldi	Íris Miranda
Odilon Wagner	Otávio Miranda
Kadu Moliterno	César Rodrigues
Tereza Seiblitz	Débora Batista
Giuseppe Oristanio	Afonso Malta Reymond Lopes
Giselle Tigre	Linda Albuquerque Malta
Carlos Bonow	Marcos Valentim "Marcão"
Joana Limaverde	Letícia Silvério
Charles Paraventi	Afrânio
Márcia Barros	Mariana
André D'Biase	Vinícius Lemos
Bia Montez	Vilma Ribeiro da Silva
Helder Agostini	Fernando Malta Reymond Lopes "Fernandinho / FM"
Letícia Colin	Kailani Rodrigues

=== Special appearances ===
Interpreter	Character
Lucélia Santos	Jackeline Lemos "Jackie"
Juan Alba	Paulinho
Renata Mattos	Estela Mello
Eva Todor	Isaura
Ernani Moraes	Armando
Luiza Valdetaro	Rose
Marisol Ribeiro	Tininha
Jardel Mello	Rodolfo
Ilva Niño	Teresa de Almeida
Ilya São Paulo	Tadeu
Bel Kutner	Sônia
Betina Vianny	Dora
Cláudio Correia e Castro	Aristides Maia
Gisele Fróes	Aparecida
Bernardo Marinho	Rogério
Antônio Pedro	Tonho
Cláudio Gabriel	Juanito
Ana Carolina Dias	Rosaly
Helga Nemeczyk	Michelle
Guilherme Trajano	Jorginho
Regina Remencius	Marilise
Gisele Arnaud	Célia Regina
André Rocha	Ricky
Janaína Moura	Beth
Jayme del Cuento	Ares
Rodolfo Freitas	Alexandre
Guilherme Medaglia	Mário
Louise Peres	Kailani's friend
Bruna Pietronave	Lucinha
Rosana Oliveira	Christianne "Chris"
Ricardo Pavão	Álvaro
Evelyn Oliveira	Joana
Arthur Lopes	Miguel
Mariana Richard	Cristina
Thiago Rodrigues	Himself
Oswaldo Louzada	Antônio
Nicolas Trevijano	Cristina's ex-husband
Nadja Haddad	Kelly

== Season 10 ==
Interpreter	Character
Sérgio Marone	Victor Amorim
Manuela do Monte	Luísa Viana
Nathalia Rodrigues	Carla Martins Viana
Paulo Nigro	Murilo Andrade Brito
Alexandre Slaviero	Carlos Henrique Soares "Kiko"
Gisele Frade	Adriana Spinelli "Drica"
Juliana Silveira	Julia Miranda
Henri Castelli	Pedro Rodrigues
Bárbara Borges	Thaíssa Bandiolli
Cauã Reymond	Maurício Terra "Maumau"
Daniele Suzuki	Miyuki Shimahara
Sérgio Hondjakoff	Arthur Malta Reymond Lopes "Cabeção"
Renata Dominguez	Solene Ribeiro da Silva "Sol"
Sérgio Abreu	Alberto Bandini "Beto"
Ícaro Silva	Rafael Monteiro "Rafa"
Maria Flor	Regina Portobelo "Rê"
Tatiana Muniz	Manuela Ribeiro "Manu"
Jorge de Sá	Mateus Bueno
Maitê Proença	Daniela Amorim
José de Abreu	Paulo Viana
Totia Meireles	Sandra Viana
Suely Franco	Laila Amorim
André D'Biase	Vinícius Lemos
Bia Montez	Vilma Rebeiro da Silva
Nuno Leal Maia	Paulo Pasqualette
Charles Paraventi	Afrânio
Carla Cabral	Ana Paula
Márcia Barros	Mariana
Mário Hermeto	Maciel
Paulo César Grande	Heitor
Renata Nascimento	Mônica Viana
Kaian Raia	Bruno Amorim

=== Special appearances ===
Interpreter	Character
Evandro Mesquita	Rômulo Amorim
Giuseppe Oristanio	Afonso Malta Reymond Lopes
Mauro Mendonça	Osvaldo Martins
Paulo César Grande	Heitor Brito
Jorge Dória	Carmelo Bandini
Marjorie Estiano	Fabiana
Monique Alfradique	Natália "Bruxinha"
João Vitti	Leonardo
Walter Breda	Bigodão
Jorge de Sá	Mateus
Luma Costa	Duda
Lívia de Bueno	Marinalva Bandiolli
Mariah de Moraes	Patty
Omar Docena	Pode Crer
Alexandre Barros	Pablo
Ana Beatriz Cisneiros	Bárbara
Duda Nagle	Gabriel da Silva Lugano
Rodrigo Penna	Aderbal
Betito Tavares	Ceará
Tamara Barreto	Luciana Trator
Jéssica Marina	Helena
Gabriel Mota	Rodrigo
Evelyn Oliveira	Joana
Henrique Pontes	Bob

== Season 11 ==
Interpreter	Character
Juliana Didone	Letícia Gomes da Silva
Guilherme Berenguer	Gustavo da Costa Soares
Marjorie Estiano	Natasha Ferreira
João Velho	Olavo Ribeiro Junior "Catraca"
Bruno Ferrari	Carlos Eduardo Gomes da Silva "Cadu"
Graziella Schmitt	Viviane dos Reis Schneider "Vivi"
Thaís Vaz	Flávia Araújo
Paulo Nigro	Murilo Brito
Sérgio Hondjakoff	Artur Malta Reymond Lopes "Cabeção"
Daniele Suzuki	Miyuki Shimahara
Ícaro Silva	Rafael Monteiro "Rafa"
Gisele Frade	Adriana Spinelli "Drica"
Alexandre Slaviero	Carlos Henrique Soares "Kiko"
Laila Zaid	Isabel Freitas "Bel"
Lidi Lisboa	Aline Coimbra
Pedro Nercessian	Fabrício Pereira
Alex Gomes	Antônio Marins "TDB"
Jean Fercondini	Felipe Saldanha
Cissa Guimarães	Beatriz da Costa Soares
Eduardo Lago	Marcelo Henrique da Costa Soares
Tássia Camargo	Lúcia Gomes da Silva
Ricardo Petraglia	José da Silva "Zé"
Nuno Leal Maia	Paulo Pasqualete
Dalton Vigh	Oscar Nunes Medeiros
Íris Bustamante	Sabrina
Vanessa Bueno	Cláudia
Chris Couto	Beth Leão
Charles Paraventi	Afrânio
André De Biase	Vinícius Lemos
Bia Montez	Vilma Ribeiro da Silva
Humberto Carrão	Diogo da Costa Soares
Lara Rodrigues	Camila da Costa Soares
Cleslay Delfino	Wiliam

=== Special appearances ===
Interpreter	Character
Martha Mellinger	Solange dos Reis Schneider
Mônica Torres	Elisa Saldanha
Mateus Solano	Carlos
Luiz Guilherme	Olavo Ribeiro "Olavão"
Milton Gonçalves	Judge
Bento Ribeiro	Marcelinho
Floriano Peixoto	Rodrigo Otávio
Raul Gazolla	Francisco Roberto
Stepan Nercessian	Doctor Gusmão
Eva Todor	Leonora
Aline Borges	Giovana Lima
Marcos Breda	Fernando
Flávio Bauraqui	Tião
Bruna di Tullio	Mônica
Herbert Bianchi	Luciano
Nilton Bicudo	James
Augusto Zacchi	Mateus
Anderson Lau	Koji
José Rubens Chachá	Calixto
Rachel Ripani	Dominic Saad
Letícia Medina	Nininha
Karla Tenório	Jasmim
Waldir Gozzi	Natasha Producer
Paula Pereira	Silvinha
Clara Garcia	Lélia
Larissa Bracher	Liliane
Keruse Bongiolo	Sofia
Flávia Rubim	Vanessa
Élcio Romar	Edgar
Roney Facchini	Gérard homard
Sophie Charlotte	Student
Daniel Erthal	Student
Marcelo Adnet	Client
Fábio Junqueira	Prosecutor
Camilo Bevilacqua	Lawyer
Rodrigo Drippe	Alvinho
Otto Jr.	Armandão
Mariana Spinello	Cecília
Renata Paschoal	Patrícia
Caio Fleischmann	Ahmed
Deyse Rose	Joana
Débora Almeida	Ângela
Keli Freitas	Marcela
Evelyn Oliveira	Joana
Michel Max	Eduardo
Luiz Antônio do Nascimento	Zezinho
Henrique Taxman	Sérgio
Manuela do Monte	Luísa Viana
Sérgio Marone	Victor Amorim
Maria Flor	Regina Portobelo "Rê"
Tatiana Muniz	Manuela Ribeiro "Manu"
Jorge de Sá	Mateus Bueno
Totia Meireles	Sandra Viana
José de Abreu	Paulo Viana
Fernanda Vasconcellos	Betina Sorrento
Rosamaria Murtinho	Nair Sorrento "Naná"
Thiago Rodrigues	Bernardo Barreto

== Season 12 ==
Interpreter	Character
Fernanda Vasconcellos	Betina Sorrento Moreira Lopes
Thiago Rodrigues	Bernardo Barreto
Marco Antônio Gimenez	Alexandre Camello Rivera Júnior "Urubu"
Joana Balaguer	Jaqueline Garcia Bittencourt "Jaque"
Marjorie Estiano	Natasha Ferreira
Java Mayan	João Garcia Bittencourt Mendonça
Juliana Didone	Letícia Gomes da Silva
Guilherme Berenguer	Gustavo da Costa Soares
Alexandre Slaviero	Carlos Henrique Soares "Kiko"
Thiara Palmieri	Amanda Almeida Pinheiro
Daniel Erthal	Leonardo Miranda Coelho "Léo"
Wagner Santisteban	Igor Palma "Download"
Laila Zaid	Isabel Freitas "Bel"
Lidi Lisboa	Aline Coimbra
Danielle Suzuki	Miyuki Shimahara
Sérgio Hondjakoff	Artur Malta Reymond Lopes "Cabeção"
Ícaro Silva	Rafael Monteiro "Rafa"
Fany Georguleas	Cristina Ribeiro "Kitty"
José Loreto	Marcolino da Silva "Marcão"
Graziella Schmitt	Viviane Reis Schneider "Vivi"
Felipe Titto	Frederico Foster "Marley"
Renato Franco	Julião
Cristiana Oliveira	Rita Garcia Bittencourt Mendonça
Oscar Magrini	Júlio César Garcia Bittencourt Mendonça
Rosamaria Murtinho	Nair Sorrento "Naná"
Paulo Betti	Miguel Barreto
Rocco Pitanga	Gabriel Calmon "Rico"
John Herbert	Horácio Barreto
Nuno Leal Maia	Paulo Pasqualete
Chris Couto	Beth Leão
Charles Paraventi	Afrânio
Íris Bustamante	Sabrina
Nicolas Trevijano	Rodrigo
Tássia Camargo	Lúcia Gomes da Silva
Bia Montez	Vilma Ribeiro da Silva
Joe Wolfart	Waldisney
Bia Junqueira	Cida
César Cardadeiro	Pedro Palma
Debby Lagranha	Tatyane Diniz "Taty"
Thaiane Maciel	Juliana Garcia Bittencourt Mendonça "Ju"
Evelyn Oliveira	Joana

=== Special appearances ===
Interpreter	Character
Eliete Cigarini	Laura Andrade
Cássia Linhares	Graça Freitas "Gracinha"
Eduardo Pires	Roberto Dias Moreira "Beto"
Eduardo Barcellos	Kadu
André D'Biase	Vinicius Lemos
Augusto Garcia	Gabriel
Othon Bastos	Adolfo
Sophie Charlotte	Azaléia
Bete Mendes	Filó
Xuxa Lopes	Vanessa Ávila
Geórgia Gomide	Mamma Francesca
Nizo Neto	Vicente Bruno
Lucy Ramos	Valeria
Marcelo Adnet	Boca
Karina Dohme	Carina
Daniel Del Sarto	Renzo Di Marco
Dudu Pelizzari	Hugo
Sônia Lima	Susana
Fábio Mássimo	Sandoval
Mariah de Moraes	Lulli
Luma Costa	Flávia
Juliana Lohmann	Ciça
Ângela Correa	Noêmi
Thiago de Los Reyes	Jonas
Francisco Carvalho	Sebastião
Ida Gomes	Helga
Jaime Leibovitch	César
Bruno Padilha	Mauro
Gisela Reimann	Marta
Anna Cotrim	Fabiane
Marcelo Saback	Presenter of the forró competition at the club
André Arteche	Joaquim / Nando
Adriano Petermann	Julinho Babão
Ronaldo Oliva	Ferreira
Beatriz Blancsak	Liz
Créo Kellab	DJ Las Vegas
Luis Strassburger	Luís André
Paulo Leite	Ignácio amaral
Caroline Abras	Anita
Wagner Trindade	Biela
Tom Junior	Tiago Chermont
Giselle Delaia	Bianca
João Antonio	Armando Gomes
Marco Audino	Belchior Costa
Luciana Malavasi	Kelly
Alexandre Lemos	Renato Amaral "Rato"
Filipe Kammer	Roberto
Daniela Guaraná	Camélia
Mara Curvo	Beta
Fernanda Slaviero	Carol
Frank Borges	Jimmy Greco
Juliana Vasconcelos	Amarílis
Júlia Lund	Gisele
Anita Falcão	Raíssa
Aline Aguiar	Rossana
Alexsandro Palermo	Hélio
Murilo Elbas	Leonel
Bernardo Castro Alves	Luisinho Gambá
Thiago Oliveira	Daniel
Bernardo Melo Barreto	Cauã San Martin
Marcos Pitombo	Roger Roma "Siri"
Daniel Boaventura	Adriano Lopes
Marília Martins	Rose

== Season 13 ==
Interpreter	Character
Luiza Valdetaro	Manuela Prado "Manu"
Bernardo Melo Barreto	Cauã Guedes San Martin
Gabriel Wainer	Eduardo Mesquita Andrade "Edu"
Monique Alfradique	Priscila Bittencourt
Camila dos Anjos	Roberta Valença
Thiara Palmieri	Amanda Almeida Pinheiro
Marco Antônio Gimenez	Alexandre Camelo Rivera Júnior "Urubu"
Joana Balaguer	Jaqueline Garcia "Jaque"
Dudu Pelizzari	Frederico Bittencourt "Fred"
Wagner Santisteban	Igor Palma "Download"
Laila Zaid	Isabel Freitas "Bel"
Alexandre Slaviero	Carlos Henrique Soares "Kiko"
Bernardo Mendes	Ivan Cardoso "Bodão"
Ícaro Silva	Rafael Monteiro "Rafa"
Giordanna Forte	Giovana Scarponi
Karen Junqueira	Teresa Maia "Tuca"
Java Mayan	João Garcia
Juliana Boller	Marina Vilela
Marcos Pitombo	Roger Roma "Siri"
José Loreto	Marcolino da Silva "Marcão"
Fabrício Santiago	Cleiton Souza
Gian Bernini	Wellington Montes "Mulambo"
Cláudia Ohana	Raquel Valença "Cigarra"
Marcello Novaes	Daniel San Martin "Formigão"
Juan Alba	Marco Aurélio Andrade
Ângela Figueiredo	Sônia Mesquita Andrade
Daniel Boaventura	Adriano Lopes
Francisca Queiroz	Vitória Vilela
Chris Couto	Beth Leão
Charles Paraventi	Afrânio
Karla Muga	Bárbara
Alessa Monticelli	Karina
Otto Jr.	Peixotão
Leonardo Machado	Hugo
Cidinha Milan	Rosa
Bia Montez	Vilma Ribeiro da Silva
André D'Biase	Vinícius Lemos
Tássia Camargo	Lúcia Gomes da Silva
Karla Nogueira	Aurélia
Joe Wolfart	Waldisney
Evelyn Oliveira	Joana
Marcela Barrozo	Antônia Valença
César Cardadeiro	Pedro
Vitor Novello	Antônio Ramos "Tonzinho"
Arthur Lopes	Lucas Guedes San Martin "Luquinhas"
Dudu Cury	Mateus

=== Special appearances ===
Interpreter	Character
Regina Remencius	Luana Guedes
Mateus Solano	Carlos
Lisandra Parede	Lavínia
Ariela Massotti	Clarinha
Gregório Duvivier	Gilson
Micael Borges	Zeca
Erom Cordeiro	Wagner
Vitor Hugo	Felipe Parede "Tesoura"
Fernanda Pontes	Tati
Josie Pessoa	Silvinha
Luís Salem	Haroldo
Nuno Leal Maia	Paulo Pasqualete
Jandir Ferrari	Peçanha
Blota Filho	Otto
Licurgo Spinola	Deodato
Alexandre Barros	Caio
Flávia Rubim	Estelinha
Zéu Britto	Juca Bala / Meiasolá
Alice Borges	Margareth
Henrique César	Almirante
Adriano Garib	Nogueira
Dig Dutra	Leila
Betty Erthal	Aracy
Jullie	Jane
Marcella Valente	Camila
Nildo Parente	Requião
Élcio Romar	Boi
Caco Baresi	Zé
Arthur Kohl	Lourival
Roberto Arduim	Romeu
Gillray Coutinho	Acácio
Bruno Gradim	Verme
Sura Berditchevsky	Noêmia
Bellatrix Serra	Lana
Charles Myara	Itamar
Paulo Giardini	Gerson Siqueira "Siqueira"
Gisela Marques	Glória
Paula Kill	Marcela Prado
Diana Herzog	Luciana
Eunice Silva	Marcelina
William Vita	Joaquim
Cristina Amadeo	Christiane
Jacquelijne Sperandio	Bianca
Jorge Neves	Renato
Júlia Sabugosa	Kátia
Pablo Falcão	William Marques "Vampirão"
Márcia Maróstica	Lívia Melo
Naydiane Lima	Nay
Mineirinho	Himself
Thaila Ayala	Marcela Junqueira Pereira da Silva "Marcela Persí/Vanessa Galvão"
Fiorella Mattheis	Vivian Pimenta
Maria Eduarda Machado	Cecília Junqueira Albuquerque

== Season 14 ==
Interpreter	Character
Thaila Ayala	Marcela Pereira da Silva
Fiorella Mattheis	Vivian Pimenta
Maria Eduarda Machado	Cecília Junqueira Albuquerque "Ciça"
Rômulo Arantes Neto	André Dias
Bruno Udovic	Murilo Jaguar
Klebber Toledo	Mateus Molina
Gabriel Wainer	Eduardo Andrade "Edu"
Gabriela Gomes	Bruna Capettini
Giselle Batista	Clara Viana
Michelle Batista	Clarissa Viana
Marcos Pitombo	Roger Roma "Siri"
Monique Alfradique	Priscila Bittencourt
Java Mayan	João Garcia
Bernardo Mendes	Ivan Cardoso "Bodão"
Ícaro Silva	Rafael Monteiro "Rafa"
Karen Junqueira	Teresa Maia "Tuca"
Giovanna Ewbank	Márcia de Souza "Marcinha"
Victor Ferreira	Rogério Rosemberg "Roleta"
Ricardo Fogliatto	Marcos Marques "Sequela"
Guilherme Fernandes	Patrick de Leon
Gian Bernini	Wellington Montes "Mulambo"
Fabricio Santiago	Cleiton Souza
José Rubens Chachá	Arnaldo Pereira da Silva / Arnaldo Persil "Pereirinha"
Soraya Ravenle	Alaíde Junqueira Pereira da Silva / Alaíde Persil "Lalá"
Bianca Byington	Talita Junqueira Albuquerque "Tatá"
Guilherme Fontes	Fernando Albuquerque "Naninho"
Norma Blum	Dionísia Pimenta
Antônio Pedro	Valério Pimenta "Capitão"
Claudia Ohana	Raquel Valença
Daniel Boaventura	Adriano Lopes
Guilherme Winter	Thiago Junqueira
Larissa Bracher	Maria Eduarda "Duba"
Charles Paraventi	Afrânio
Otto Jr	Peixotão
Bia Montez	Vilma Ribeiro da Silva
Cidinha Milan	Rosa
Karla Nogueira	Aurélia
Joe Wolfart	Waldisney
João Marcelo	Andrey
João Vítor Silva	Claudionor de Oliveira "Goiaba"
Nando Caetano	Lucas Gomes "Lukinha"
Tamara Ribeiro	Flora Luiza Junqueira Albuquerque "Florinha"

=== Special appearances ===
Interpreter	Character
Ricardo Tozzi	Fábio Mancini
Fernanda de Freitas	Francesca Vidal
Rômulo Estrela	Edílson
Jonatas Faro	Fernando
Karina Dohme	Regininha Chicletinho
Geovanna Tominaga	Ana Olívia
Guilherme Weber	Leôncio Gurgel "Leozinho"
Lucio Mauro	Silva
Elias Gleizer	Tarcísio Junqueira
Marcos Damigo	Luciano Rocha
Elaine Mickely	Dada
Cláudio Jaborandy	Euzébio
Alexia Dechamps	Teresa Gurgel
Sylvia Massari	Marta Jaguar
Helena Fernandes	Scarleth
Thalita Ribeiro	Ângela
Jaime Leibovitch	Demétrio
João Camargo	Macieira
Jacqueline Laurence	Maria Pia
Turíbio Ruiz	Oswaldo
Marco Antônio Pâmio	Bernard Higgins
Luciana Fregolente	Regina
Giulio Lopes	Delegate
Gustavo Ottoni	Probation officer
Bruno Giordano	Francesco
Marina Rigueira	Dilene
Igor Tripoli	Leandro Pimenta
Karina Mello	Cristina Pimenta
Jarbas Toledo	Rajão
Juliano Lessa	Jorginho
César Perez	Flavinho
Andréa Peixoto	Tânia
Evelyn Oliveira	Joana
Chico Expedito	Rosalvo
Raul Franco	TV presenter
Samir Murad	Bolacha
Beto Vandesteen	Bola
Giselle Delaia	Paloma Giovanni
André Pellegrino	Conrado
Remo Trajano	Júlio Placenta
André Torres	Jorginho
André Falcão	Bruce
Rogério Barros	Lucca
Alexandre Mandarino	Cadu Caiado
Eduardo Gil	Breno
Luiz Américo	Caco
Sophie Charlotte	Angelina Maciel
Rafael Almeida	Gustavo Bergantini
Eliane Costa	Maria das Montanhas "Montanhas"
Zezeh Barbosa	Conceição Maciel
Lucas de Jesus	Leonardo Maciel
Larissa Pereira	Antonieta Bergantini
Sílvia Salgado	Daisy Lininirro Bergantini
Zé Carlos Machado	Joaquim Bergantini

== Season 15 ==
Interpreter	Character
Sophie Charlotte	Angelina Maciel
Rafael Almeida	Gustavo Bergantin "Guga"
Nathalia Dill	Débora Rios
Caio Castro	Bruno Oliveira Guimarães
Mariana Rios	Yasmin Fontes
Jonatas Faro	Waldemar Peralta "Peralta"
Cleiton Morais	Andréas Campadelli
Carolinie Figueiredo	Domingas Gentil
Johnny Massaro	Fernando Chalfon "Fernandinho"
Sophia Abrahão	Felipa Gentil
Mariah Rocha	Chiara Marcondes
Daniel Uemura	Raiden Nishimira
Maxwell Nascimento	Pedro Firmino
Bernardo Mendes	Ivan Cardoso "Bodão"
Keli Freitas	Luana de Assis
Raisa Gaio	Giselle Marmontel "Gi"
Licurgo Spínola	Félix Rios
Carolina Kasting	Béatrice Loprét
Daniel Boaventura	Adriano Lopes
Daniel Boaventura	Mariano Lopes
Daniel Boaventura	Adriana Lopes "Drica"
Isabel Fillardis	Rita de Cássia Dutra Berguer
Sílvia Salgado	Daisy Lininirro Bergantin
Zé Carlos Machado	Joaquim Bergantin
Guilherme Winter	Tiago Junqueira
Camila Rodrigues	Teresa Lopes
Sérgio Loroza	Orfeu
Beth Lamas	Daniela Forte "Forte"
Déborah Kalume	Eneida Marmontel
Eliane Costa	Maria das Montanhas "Montanhas"
Antônio Pedro Borges	Valério
Rael Barja	Carlos Pascoal "Caju"
Sóstenes Vidal	Isidoro
Henrique Taipas	Godofredo Leitão "Gordofredo"
Evelyn Oliveira	Joana
Karla Nogueira	Aurélia
Dulcinéia Dibo	Zulaide
Larissa Pereira	Antonieta Bergantin
Kaleo Maciel	Marcelo Forte "Fortinho"
Fabiana Motta	Carolina Forte "Fortinha"
Lucas D'Jesus	Leonardo Maciel "Léo"
Nando Caetano	Lucas Gomes "Lukinha"

=== Special appearances ===
Interpreter	Character
Zezeh Barbosa	Conceição Maciel
Sidney Sampaio	Tony Fontes
Ângela Vieira	Diva Junqueira Arrel
Norma Blum	Dionísia Pimenta
Fátima Freire	Elisa Fontes
Dedina Bernadelli	Marília Oliveira
Ellen Roche	Juju
Augusto Garcia	Thiago
Alexandre Liuzzi	Jack Valverde
Bruce Gomlevsky	Frank
Sandra Pêra	Mafalda
Thaíssa Carvalho	Tina
Gustavo Rodrigues	Jaime
Thalita Ribeiro	Claudinha
Suzana Pires	Mercedes
Thiago Picchi	Carlos Almeida Miranda "Carlinhos"
Wagner Molina	Dutra
Buza Ferraz	Markus Oliveira
Cadu Fávero	João Paulo Firmino
Carla Faour	Vilma
Carlo Mossy	Daniel Viveiros
Débora Lamm	Clara
Dig Dutra	Claudina
Franciely Freduzeski	Sarah Chalfon
Gláucio Gomes	Alexei
Hugo Carvana	Paulo Loprèt
Isaac Bardavid	Ramarashi Arashi
Joana Limaverde	News reporter
Jorge Fernando	Jorge Reyes Borges Reterto
José Augusto Branco	Inspector
Julia Rabello	Juliana
Luisa Thiré	Elisa
Luiz Magnelli	Priest Honório
Patrícia Barros	Mayara
Thiago José	Juca
Priscila Camargo	Secretary
Maria Lúcia Dahl	Creusa
Roney Facchini	Armando de Assis
Lisa Fávero	Paula
Adriana Zattar	Simone Lopes
Alexandra Martins	Cíntia
Alexia Garcia	Saionara
André Rebustini	Oscarzinho
Andressa Koetz	Sofia
Antonio Barboza	Barmen Cataclisma
Auro Medeiros	Mateus
Beto Nasci	Omar Fontes
Bruno Vieira	Maurício
Camila Caputti	Lurdinha
Carolina Ferman	Daniela
Carol Mainerz	Katarina
Christina Rodrigues	Gipsy
Rafa Durand	Jeff
Ricardo Milano	Dudu
William Vita	Getúlio
Luzia Avellar	Jacinta
Juliana Totti	Marina
Julia Brunelli	Leila
Marcelo Torreão	Lindovando Lindo
Mauro Jasmin	Juan Cabrón
Oberdan Júnior	Antonio Salabiam "Toninho"
Zulma Mercadante	Marinara
Bianca Bin	Marina Vidal Monteiro Miranda
Micael Borges	Luciano Ribeiro
Amanda Richter	Veridiana Cavalera
Jessika Alves	Norma Jean Valadares

== Season 16 ==
Interpreter	Character
Bianca Bin	Marina Vidal Monteiro Miranda / Penélope Valentina
Micael Borges	Luciano Ribeiro
Humberto Carrão	Caio Lemgruber
Amanda Richter	Veridiana Cavalera
Daniel Dalcin	Alex Bacelar
Jéssika Alves	Norma Jean Valadares
Mariana Rios	Yasmin Fontes
Jonatas Faro	Waldemar Peralta "Peralta"
Caio Castro	Bruno Oliveira
Carolinie Figueiredo	Domingas Gentil
Milena Toscano	Paloma Limeira
Johnny Massaro	Fernando Chalfon "Fernandinho"
Sophia Abrahão	Felipa Gentil
Helder Agostini	Marcelo Rodrigues
Lua Blanco	Julia Ribeiro "Joe"
Lisa Fávero	Paula Paes "Paulinha"
Bernardo Castro Alves	Diego dos Santos
Nêmora Cavalheiro	Rejane Vidal Monteiro Miranda
Peter Mark Guimarães	Bogumil Smith "Gringo"
Georgiana Góes	Juliana Monteiro Miranda
Pablo Padilha	Osvaldo Monteiro Miranda
Guilherme Weber	João Monteiro Miranda
Claudia Mauro	Iracema Vidal Monteiro Miranda
Maurício Mattar	Guilherme Cavalera
Helena Fernandes	Úrsula Lemgruber
Louise Cardoso	Filomena Fontes "Filó"
Paulo César Grande	Adamastor Peralta
Henrique Taipas	Godofredo Leitão "Gordofredo"
Rael Barja	Caju
Eliane Costa	Maria das Montanhas
Gustavo Rodrigues	Mauro Bacelar
Antônia Fontenelle	Kátia Valadares Bacelar "Cat"
Alice Borges	Cecília dos Santos
Guga Coelho	Rodrigo Veiga
Esther Dias	Suzana Menezes
Karla Nogueira	Aurélia
Evelyn Oliveira	Joana
Luigi Matheus	Rudson Vidal Monteiro Miranda "Rudá"
Maria Clara David	Letícia Menezes
Beto Quirino	Tomé Ribeiro

=== Special appearances ===
Interpreter	Character
Paulo Vilhena	Arthur Montenegro
Rosaly Papadopol	Olga Monteiro Miranda
Dedina Bernardelli	Marília Oliveira
Renato Borghi	Doctor Lemgrúber
Simone Soares	Victória Veronese "Vick"
Beto Quirino	Tomé Ribeiro
Dayse Braga	Bia Brum
Marcelo Laham	Plínio Souza
Mouhamed Harfouch	Fechado Souza
Carol Garcia	Heleninha
Carlo Porto	Adônis
Prazeres Barbosa	Lurdes
Clara Tiezzi	Leticia's friend
Elaine Babo	Laurinha
Luciano Huck	Himself
Josie Pessoa	Cris
Gillray Coutinho	Victor
Armando Babaioff	Marcos Resende
Simone Gutierrez	Maria João Gentil
Manuela Duarte	Flavinha
Italo Guerra	Tom
Germano Campos	Edu
André Dale	Chico
Louise Peres	Nurse
Cláudia Leitte	Herself
Paulo Ascenção	Man
Hugo Carvana	Ubiracy Cansado
Erik Marmo	Ricardo Gianini
Jorge Fernando	Paulo Mattos
Antônio Pedro Borges	Valério Pimenta
Fábio Keldani	Alan
Gustavo Ottoni	Lawyer
Cirillo Luna	Fernando Almeida "Átila"
Jorge Medina	Araçá
Guilherme Piva	Guaraná
Zé Victor Castiel	Trabuco
Rogério França	Police officer
Ragi Abib	Academy Buyer
Roberto Maya	Rubem
Jorge Junqueira	Mauro Moreira
Samir Murad	Boss of the kidnappers
Eduardo Dascar	Kidnapper
Cristiane Machado	Yasmin and Peralta's neighbor
Dan Marins	Muchiba
Felipe Roque	Renato Foquinha "Renatão"
Cinara Leal	Maria
Ana Maria Braga	Herself
Tom Veiga	Louro José
Bruno Mazzeo	Marciano

== Season 17 ==
Interpreter	Character
Fiuk	Bernardo Melo Oliveira "Bê"
Christiana Ubach	Cristiana Araújo "Cris"
Mariana Molina	Beatriz Gomes "Bia"
Murilo Couto	Alberto Duarte "Beto"
Élida Muniz	Tatiana Fernandes "Tati"
Ricky Tavares	Rodrigo Cerqueira
Giovanna Echeverria	Fernanda Araújo "Nanda"
Olívia Torres	Rita Silveira
Johnny Massaro	Fernando Chalfon "Fernandinho"
Carolinie Figueiredo	Domingas Gentil
Caio Castro	Bruno Oliveira Guimarães
Thaís Botelho	Samira Al Rashid
Rafaela Ferreira	Juliana Borboleta "Juju"
Erich Pelitz	Victor Cardoso
Julia Bernat	Valentina Duarte
Isabella Dionísio	Maria Cláudia Guimarães
William Barbier	Alexandre Dias "Alê"
João Maia	João Pedro Motta "Jpeg"
Erik Vesch	Lucca Aguiar
Daniel Belmonte	Renato Cornélio "Reco"
Vitor Lucas	Rafael
Cristiano Sauma	Bimba
Vera Zimmermann	Cissa Melo Oliveira
Tarcísio Filho	Paulo Roberto Oliveira
Sergio Mastropasqua	Antônio Araújo
Priscila Marinho	Zuleide Borboleta "Zuzu"
José de Abreu	Augusto Livramento
Eri Johnson	Anselmo Colibri
Graziella Schmitt	Letícia dos Santos
Lafayette Galvão	Emílio
Angela Dippe	Tânia
Regina Remencius	Lise Fischer Ribeiro
Ricardo Ciciliano	Sérgio Teixeira "Serjão"
Gláucio Gomes	Ricardo Casanova "Casca"
Rael Barja	Caju
João Vithor Oliveira	Jonas Duarte
Luciana Didone	Ana Clara Melo Oliveira "Clarinha"
Igor Rudolf	Guilherme Cardoso "Limão"

=== Special appearances ===
Interpreter	Character
Marco Antônio Gimenez	Flávio Riveira
Virginia Cavendish	Linda Glitter
Viétia Zangrandi	Cíntia
Anja Bittencourt	Antonieta
Aramis Trindade	Nelson
Bruce Gomlevsky	Francisco Silveira
Everaldo Pontes	Ariovaldo
Flávio Bauraqui	Milton
Hamilton Ricardo	Armindo
Henrique César	Samad
Jacques Lagoa	Ciro
Karina Mello	Janaína
Lorena Comparato	Carolina
Márcio Vito	Journalist
Javert Monteiro	Zé
Jonas Torres	Carlos Alberto
Theresa Amayo	Araci
Thaís Melchior	Student
Gil Coelho	Student
Júlio Levy	Cooking teacher
Narjara Turetta	Woman
Duda Mamberti	Student's father
Adriana Martinuzzo	Sílvia
Aldair Ferreira	Galocha
Alexia Garcia	Jorgina
Ana Paula Botelho	Nancy
Ângelo Brandini	Carlão
Antonio Barboza	Pedophile
Antônio Karnewale	Jamal
Antônio Pessoa	Hugo
Arthur Aguiar	Boy
Camila Leccioli	Luana
Carlos André Faria	João Simões
Gustavo Silva	João Pedro
Christiano Torreão	Hans
Cláudio Galvan	Manoel
Danilo Sacramento	Presenter of the Skating Championship
Dayse Pozatto	Kátia Simões
Giulia Frota	Luli
Gustavo Goulart	Juninho
Helio Rodrigues	Sapão
Kaká Santana	Clóvis
Lucas Romano	Valter
Maurício Pitanga	Marcelo
Luís Renato	Léo
Marcelo Argenta	Renato
Mário Hermeto	Doctor
Monica Melissa	Alzira
Nathalie Meg	Keka
Patrícia Bacha	Elizete
Rafaela Lapuente	Camila
Renata Ghelli	Cibele
Renato Lobo	Doctor
Sérgio Monte	Peixoto
Simone Pontes	Arlete
Tatiana Pontes	Marcela
Thiago Oliveira	Hélio
Vanessa Bueno	Patrícia
Vanessa Fontana	Nininha
Chico Anysio	Himself
Diego Hipolito	Himself
Luan Santana	Himself
Luciano Huck	Himself

== Season 18 ==
Interpreter	Character
Bruno Gissoni	Pedro da Silva Lopes
Daniela Carvalho	Catarina Leal Barreto "Cat"
Ariela Massotti	Raquel Bazin Barreto
Gabriel Chadan	Lúcio Diégues
Ana Terra Blanco	Ângela Moutinho "Anjinha"
Ronny Kriwat	Theo da Silva Lopes / Theo Gonçalves
Luiza Casé	Lorelai Magalhães
Ivan Mendes	Guilherme Marques "Gui"
Duam Socci	Eric Diniz
Nathalie Jourdan	Maria Eduarda Leal Barreto "Duda"
Lucas Salles	Eduardo Godói "Dodói"
Bernardo Mesquita	Frederico Leal Barreto "Fred"
Alice Wegmann	Andréa Ramos
Marcello Melo Jr.	Maicon de Sousa
Maria Pinna	Bárbara Medeiros "Babi"
Flávia Cunha	Raíssa
Igor Cosso	Rafael
Júlia Oristânio	Joseane Brito "Josi"
Fabio Beltrão	Carlos Eduardo Nogueira "Cadu"
Junior Madalena	Carlos Francisco "Franja"
Carolina Lavigne	Laura Segadas
Lucci Ferreira	Henrique Colin "Rique"
Helena Ranaldi	Tereza Marins
Marcos Winter	Odilon Gusmão dos Santos
Rodrigo Veronese	João Paulo
Sandra Corveloni	Lurdes da Silva Lopes
Ranieri Gonzalez	Geraldo da Silva Lopes
Luciana Borghi	Railda Gonçalves
Gisela Reimann	Cláudia Leal Barreto
Joelson Medeiros	Fausto Barreto
Inez Viana	Zica de Sousa
Ailton Graça	José Pinto "Seu Pintinho"
MV Bill	Antônio
Márcio Ribeiro	Romero
Cris Nicolotti	Vera Marins
Walter Breda	Agenor Barreto
Alexandre Barros	Roberto Segadas
Jacqueline Dalabona	Iara Medeiros
Henrique Schaffer	Milton Medeiros
Christiane Alves	Luíza
Kiko Vianello	Moraes
Marizabel Pacheco	Creuza
Pedro Van-Held	Arthur Coelho
Anna Rita Cerqueira	Milena
Pedro Maya	Carlos "Carlinhos / Obama"
Yago Machado	Flávio "Flavinho"

=== Special appearances ===
Interpreter	Character
Ully Lages	Kátia Gonçalves
Dandara de Morais	Júlia Silvino
Mario José Paz	André Farnel
Genézio de Barros	Hélio Ribeiro
Arlete Heringer	Márcia Carneiro
Thalma de Freitas	Nathália
Rita Guedes	Marlene
Raoni Carneiro	Rogério
Rafael Cabral Barbosa	Rafael
Renata Sayuri	Sara Lee
Ricardo Pavão	Anísio
Rogério Fabiano	Jaime
Sérgio Vieira	Sérgio
Yanna Lavigne	Laís
Yachmin Gazal	Nair
Hugo Resende	Dênis
Dênis Derkian	Guerra
Jurema Reis	Clara
Luciana Fregolente	Gioconda
Camilo Bevilacqua	Marcelo
Cláudia Ventura	Nívea
Nando Rodrigues	Botija
Paula Braun	Rosana
Antônia Frering	Stylist
Iná de Carvalho	Aurora
Marco Marcondes	Carlito
Álvaro Abraão	Vinícius Pastrone
Paula Possani	Rejane
Betito Tavares	Chico
André Pellegrino	Marcos
Beto Quirino	Raimundo Duarte
Chico Expedito	Delegate
Danilo Sacramento	Beto
Dudu Pires	Boladão waiter
Gilberto Marmorosch	Agostinho
Jaqueline Dantas	Rose
Monique Storch	Maria
Orlando Soares	Nelson
Rebeca Bueno	Doctor
Sheila Mattos	Angela's mother
Tássia Gomes	Joseane's cousin
Thiago José de Borba	Mathias
Vanessa Jardim	Anita
Zeli Oliveira	Dalva
Neymar	Himself
Paulo Henrique Ganso	Himself
Mabel Cezar	Party guest

== Season 19 ==
Interpreter	Character
Caio Paduan	Gabriel Nascimento
Bia Arantes	Aléxia Manfredi
Thaís Melchior	Cristal Vianna
Alejandro Claveaux	Moisés Coelho
Marcella Rica	Bárbara Vasconcelos "Babi"
Lucas Cordeiro	Betão
Kadu Moliterno	Nelson
Letícia Spiller	Laura
Danton Mello	Fabiano
Helena Fernandes	Carmem
Maurício Destri	Kiko Freitas
Carla Salle	Natália
Valentina Seabra	Maria Meira
Gil Coelho	Guido
Juliana Lohmann	Débora
Giovana Ferrer	Michele
Anderson Müller	Ademir
Soraya Ravenle	Sandra "Sandrinha"
Pedro Tergolina	Filipe "Lipe"
Felipe Haiut	Igor Santos "Ziggy"
Bella Camero	Isabela
Thiago de Los Reyes	Tomás
Bernardo Velasco	Nando
Douglas Sampaio	Jefferson "Jeff"
Pedro Bernardo	Dieguinho
Edvana Carvalho	Aparecida
Regina Sampaio	Beatriz
Virginia Cavendish	Helena
Maíra Charken	Verinha
Jacqueline Fernandez	Charlene
Giulio Lopes	Vinicius
Miguel Arraes	Igor
Lima Jr.	Bertoni
Jonathan Azevedo	Luciano Simões "Fôjo"

=== Special appearances ===
Interpreter	Character
Pierre Baitelli	Douglas
Cláudia Ohana	Yara Fagundes
Guga Coelho	Vitinho
Maria Joana	Luana
Camilo Bevilacqua	Jorge
Tarciana Saad	Suzana
Bruno Gradim	Ruy
Alex Reis	Diego
Renata Santos	Vânia
Thaíssa Carvalho	Cristina Lima "Timtim"
Dandara Mariana	Tamires Lourenço "Tamtam"
Odilon Wagner	Juarez Soares da Rocha
Bruce Gomlevsky	Paolo Manfredi
Jui Huang	Translator of Master Chuang Tse
Bernardo Castro Alves	Felipe's friend
Stella Maria Rodrigues	Teresa
Paulo Mathias Jr.	Miltinho
Bruno Bevan	Guilherme
Chico Expedito	Francisco Manara
Ênio Nunes	Valdir do Cavaco
Hugo Maia	Gorila
Jefferson Almeida	Juninho
Rafael Canedo	Rafa
Antônio Fargoni	Bernardo
Mariana Cerrone	Aninha
Thiago Jose	Amaldo
Luciana Malcher	Coxinha
Robson Rozza	Tiziu
Juliana Linares	Samara
Ana Miranda	Rose
Adriana Zattar	Sofia Manfredi
Julia Werneck	Luísa
Alexandre Basílio	Carcará
Bruno Sobral	Sabiá
Guilherme Ferraz	Café
Luiz Antônio do Nascimento	Janjão
João Antônio	Chicão
Plinio Soares	Kung Fu Master
Juliana Guimarães	Director
Paola Oliveira	Herself
Eriberto Leão	Himself
Ana Maria Braga	Herself
Milton Nascimento	Himself
Anderson Leonardo	Himself
Diogo Nogueira	Himself
Thiaguinho	Himself
Sambô	Themselves

== Season 20 ==
Interpreter	Character
Alice Wegmann	Lia Martins
Agatha Moreira	Juliana Menezes "Ju"
Guilherme Leicam	Vitor Machado
Daniel Blanco	Gilberto Porto "Gil"
Juliana Paiva	Maria de Fátima dos Prazeres "Fatinha"
Rodrigo Simas	Bruno Menezes
Guilherme Prates	Adriano Costa Miranda "Dinho"
David Lucas	Álvaro Gabriel Antunes Júnior "Orelha"
Cacá Ottoni	Morgana Almeida Rocha
Jéssica Ellen	Rita Lima Svensson
Victor Sparapane	Frederico Massafera "Fera"
Guilherme Dellorto	Nélio Rodrigues
Rodolfo Valente	Rafael Freire "Rafa"
Peter Brandão	Leonel Baptista de Souza "Pilha"
Louise D'Tuani	Luana Fiorentino
Pedro Cassiano	Salvador Machado "Sal"
Mariana Cortines	Erika Matoso "Kika"
Talita Tilieri	Ana Paula Soares
Bruno Quixotte	Leonardo Magalhães "Rasta"
Elisa Brites	Valentina
Blota Filho	Director Mathias Albuquerque
Leonardo Miggiorin	Leandro Maciel
Elisa Pinheiro	Isabela Chaves "Belinha"
Danielle Winits	Marcela Porto
Danilo Sacramento	Cezar Augusto
Patrícia Costa	Sônia
Zeca Carvalho	Jorge
Maksin Oliveira	Robson de Oliveira
Marcelo Várzea	Lorenzo Martins
Ida Celina	Paulina Martins "Vó Lina"
Luiz Gustavo	Rômulo Rios
Patrícia Vilela	Raquel Martins
Tânia Tôko	Rosa de Oliveira
Sílvia Pfeifer	Marta Menezes
Leonardo Franco	Olavo Menezes
Leo Jaime	Fernando Rocha "Nando"
Vanessa Lóes	Beatriz Almeida Rocha "Tizinha"
Thalma de Freitas	Luiza Lima Svensson
Carla Marins	Alice Miranda
Eduardo Galvão	Mário Costa
Maria Paula	Bárbara Rios Costa
Malu Valle	Clotilde Maciel "Clô"
Bruno Dubeux	Michel
Wendell Bendelack	Severino
Márcio Vito	Axel
Pietra Pan	Constância Martins "Tatá"
Xande Valois	Henrique Rios Costa "Tico"
Vitor Colman	Juca
Lara Jhúlia Dellias	Letícia

=== Special appearances ===
Interpreter	Character
Bruno Peixoto	Gustavo Reis "Guga"
Sérgio Marone	Lupe / Lobo
Alexandre Slaviero	Eriberto
Thaís de Campos	Vilma Antônia dos Prazeres
Paulo Coronato	Adolfo dos Prazeres
Jandir Ferrari	Ronaldo Freire
Rogéria	Carmem Rios
William Ferreira	Alek Svensson "Sven"
Kayky Brito	Ricardão
Jullie	Naomi
André Marques	Alexandre Ferreira "Mocotó"
Nuno Leal Maia	Augusto
Joana Limaverde	Débora
Aline Dias	Maná
Luís Salem	Zé Excelsior
Ana Lima	Verônica
Ângela Rabelo	Bertha
Rhaisa Batista	Ulla
Simone Soares	Helga
Dja Marthins	Regina
Úrsula Corona	Betty
Edmílson Barros	Salomão Congonglustein Papuá
Gustavo Ottoni	Hector
Ana Rios	Elisa
Gael Augusto	Gringo
Beatriz Junqueira	Olga
Karen Coelho	Ester
Marcello Gonçalves	Vaguinho
Bruna Pietronave	Valdete
Mayara Lepre	Britney
Paloma Riani	Marina
Thaís Botelho	Marizete
Luciano Vidigal	Lulu Mauro
Clara Maria	Louise
Dani Gondim	Tábata
Wiranu Tembé	Tainá
Daniela Dellan	Débora
Vinícius Guerra	Rodrigo
Guilherme Almeida	Dani
Wagner Torres	Alemão
Aldino Brito	Caixote
Letícia Kerchner	Cacau
Jessica Lobo	Fabiana
Amanda Parisi	Jennifer
Rafael Bulhões	Léo
Pablo Siviero	Anderson Loiola
Thais Puello	Michele
Wanessa Alves	Nanda
Marlon Schuck	Pepê
Rafael Faioli	Vitor Torvi
Dan Ferreira	Zé
Alexsandro Silva	Alex
Gabriela Martins Rezende	Child Lia
Manuela Carrano	Child Tatá
Josué Rabello	Child Orelha
Jota Quest	Themselves
Detonautas	Themselves
Strike	Themselves
NX Zero	Themselves
Champignon	Himself
Leoni	Himself
Pedro Bial	Himself
Thalita Rebouças	Herself
Fabiola da Silva	Herself
Naldo Benny	Himself
Silva	Himself
DJ Marlboro	Himself

== Season 21 ==
Interpreter	Character
Isabela Garcia	Vera Toledo
Tuca Andrada	Ronaldo Rocha
Bianca Salgueiro	Anita Toledo Alende
Gabriel Falcão	Benjamin Rocha Brainstein "Ben"
Hanna Romanazzi	Sofia Toledo Alende
Hugo Bonemer	Martin Goulart
Gabriel Leone	Antônio Padilha
Laís Pinho	Micaela Martins
Vitor Thiré	Sidney Aguiar
Paulo Betti	Caetano Alende
Fernanda Souza	Bernardete Biru da Costa
Alexandra Richter	Maura Aguiar
Eduardo Melo	Vitor Rocha Brainstein
Clara Tiezzi	Clara Bragança
Matheus Costa	Guilherme Nogueira "Gui"
Erom Cordeiro	João Luiz
Bruna Griphao	Giovana Rocha Brainstein
Anna Rita Cerqueira	Flaviana Sampaio
Lucca Diniz	Marcelo Antunes Júnior "Júnior"
Christian Monassa	Serguei
Cadu Paschoal	Paulino
Ana Beatriz Cisneiros	Júlia de Souza
Brendow Goyaz	Marcos Oliva "Minhoca"
Ully Lages	Laura Mendes "Diva"
Marcelo Laham	Abelardo Pasquim "Abel"
Larissa Bracher	Raissa
Luísa Micheletti	Luciana Toledo
Elam Lima	Fábio Alvares
Pedro Henrique Monteiro	Omar
Flávia Rubim	Zelândia Aguiar Alende "Zê"
Alana Ferri	Bruna
Patrícia Pinho	Soraia
Blaise Musipere	Frédéric
Luiz Serra	Gustavo
Sylvia Massari	Regina
Milena Toscano	Bárbara
Daniel Marques	Tuninho
Fabio Beltrão	Murilão
Brenda Sabryna	Antônia
Duda Nagle	Edgard "Edgato"
Tatsu Carvalho	Virgílio Chalfon
Alice Mendes	Drica
Erlene Melo	Vanessa
Marlon Queiroz	Pedro Toledo Rocha
Natalia Guedes	Tita
Sarah Serafim	Lorena

=== Special appearances ===
Interpreter	Character
Priscila Fantin	Raquel Nogueira
Erick Schons	Aurélio
Chrysti Ane Lopes	Meg Bittencourt
Luciana Coutinho	Cícera Brainstein
Gilberto Hernandez	Matias Hernandez "Hernandez"
Brenno Leone	Rafa Marinho
Gabriel Azevedo	Vinícius Goulart
Erick Brian Farid	Cadu
Keruse Bongiolo	Kellen Eleonora
Ilya São Paulo	Paulo Roberto Mesquita Palhares
Carolinie Figueiredo	Domingas
Raphael Azevedo	Eduardo
Ana Júlia Dorigon	Jade
Isabella Dionísio	Monique
Michelle Miranda	Luiza
Bia Nunnes	Marinalva
Arlete Salles	Elvira
Antonio Pitanga	Jozino de Souza
Manoela Daher	Luana
Matheus Malone	Zureta
Kacau Gomes	Babette
Bruno Nunes	Zico
Wendel Barros	Cadelão
Camila Carandino	Gislaine
Thiago Beckmann	Filipinho
Bernardo Felinto	Moura
Dieter Fuhrich	Beto Bruno
Carlos Thiré	Cláudio
Sérgio Stern	Isaac
Ana Paula Botelho	Rebeca
Caique Machado	Rafa
Maria Clara Vicente	Manu
Séfora Rangel	Matilda
Gustavo Rizzotte	Zé
Rafael Vanchaud	Carlão
Matheus Monteiro	Leco
Felipe Selau	Paulo Tiago
Erick Montes	Tiago
Juan Guimarães	Gusmão
Lyv Ziese	Briguita
Breno Augusto Guimarães	Lars
Thiaguinho	Himself
Carlinhos Brown	Himself
Cláudia Leitte	Herself
Daniel	Himself
Lulu Santos	Himself

== Season 22 ==
Interpreter	Character
Bruna Hamú	Bianca Duarte
Arthur Aguiar	Carlos Eduardo Menezes "Duca"
Isabella Santoni	Karina Duarte
Rafael Vitti	Pedro Ramos
Felipe Simas	Ricardo Cobreloa Duarte "Cobra"
Anajú Dorigon	Jade Gardel
Jeniffer Nascimento	Solange da Conceição "Sol"
Guilherme Hamacek	João França Spinelli
Antônio Carlos	Wallace Batista
Michel Joelsas	Henrique Schneider
Eriberto Leão	Gael Duarte
Emanuelle Araújo	Dandara França
Marcelo Faria	Jorge Lobo "Lobão"
Maria Joana	Natália Barreto "Nat"
Cadu Libonati	Jefferson Oliveira "Jeff"
Maria Luiza Campos	Mariana Noronha "Mari"
Manu Gavassi	Victória Nóbrega "Vicki"
Helena Fernandes	Lucrécia Gardel
Ana Rios	Bárbara Boaz "Ruiva"
Paulo Dalagnoli	Lírio Lorenzzo / Florisvaldo Silvino
Odilon Wagner	Heideguer Schneider
Patrícia França	Delma Ramos
Felipe Camargo	Marcelo Ramos
Daniele Suzuki	Roberta Fraga
Guilherme Piva	Edgard de Monmart "Ed"
Leo Jaime	Fernando Rocha "Nando"
Edmilson Barros	Lincoln Oliveira
Josie Antello	Rute Oliveira
Iná de Carvalho	Dalva Menezes
Edvana Carvalho	Bete da Conceição
Yasmin Gomlevsky	Joaquina
Lellê	Guta
Maurício Pitanga	Luiz
Gabi Lopes	Priscila
Jéssica Lobo	Fabi
Renan Pitanga	Matheus
Gabriel Reif	Rominho
Ramon Francisco	Rico
Jean Amorim	Marcão
Bruno Fraga	Zé
Bruno Hoffmann	Max
Otávio Mella	Léo
Ycaro Tavares	Thawik
Bianca Vedovato	Maria Antônia Ramos "Tomtom"

=== Special appearances ===
Interpreter	Character
Mário Frias	Renê Spinelli
Nanda Costa	Josefina Carrara
Cleiton Morais	Paulo Brum
Álamo Facó	Haroldo Motta Silveira
Alice Wegmann	Lia Martins
Ana Botafogo	Herself
Ana Paula Bouzas	Quitéria Cobreloa
Nicole Gomes	Tainá
Cacá Ottoni	Morgana Rocha
Daniel Blanco	Gilberto Porto "Gil"
David Lucas	Álvaro Gabriel Antunes Júnior "Orelha"
Nikolas Antunes	Germano
Felipe Cunha	Andrei
Matheus Cunha	Júlio
Diego Amaral	Alan Menezes
Daniela Dillan	Paula
Caio Lucas Leão	Luiz Cláudio
Luellem Castro	Ana Flor
Dinho Ouro Preto	Himself
Erick Silva	Himself
Fly	Himself
Irene Ravache	Herself
Jéssica Andrade	Ronda
João Vitti	Marcus Figueiredo
John Green	Himself
José Aldo	Himself
Juliana Paiva	Maria de Fátima dos Prazeres "Fatinha"
Junior Cigano	Himself
Luan Santana	Himself
Maksin Oliveira	Robson
Marcelo Adnet	José Alvarenga
Miguel Costa	Robinson
Narcisa Tamborindeguy	Herself
Natiruts	Themselves
NX Zero	Themselves
Patrick Torres	Reinaldo
Paula Fernandes	Herself
Pedro Rizzo	Himself
Ronny Kriwat	Franz
Tonico Pereira	Santiago
Matheus de Oliveira	Matheus
Bianca Loyola	Bia
Beatriz de Oliveira	Beatriz
Bismarck Lima	Bismarck
Carla Vanúbia	Carla
Brigida Andrade	Brigida
Naty Meg	Manuela
Ademir de Souza	Simplício da Conceição
Ana Vitória Bastos	Luísa
Camile Leite	Paty
Carolina Macieira	Ana
Chico Mello	Panda
Luma Antunes	Aline
Alan Pellegrino	Juvenal

== Season 23 ==
Interpreter	Character
Marina Moschen	Luciana Almeida
Nicolas Prattes	Rodrigo Alcântara
Julia Konrad	Cecília Guerra Montes "Ciça"
Felipe Titto	Vitor Bragantino "Samurai"
Lucas Lucco	Uodson de Souza "Uood"
Pâmela Tomé	Alina Machado de Souza
Brenno Leone	Roger Veiga
Vitor Novello	Luan de Souza
Laryssa Ayres	Jéssica Ramos
Amanda de Godoi	Fernanda Tetel "Nanda"
Cynthia Senek	Maria Cristina Manosso "Krica"
Francisco Vitti	Filipe Tinoco "Fil"
Nego do Borel	Cleyton da Silva
Maicon Rodrigues	Humberto Praça "Beto"
Giulia Costa	Lívia Alcântara
Gabriel Kaufmann	Artur Campelo
Lívian Aragão	Júlia Porto
Marcela Fetter	Flávia Campos
Bruno Montaleone	Glauco Faria
Vanessa Gerbelli	Ana Lúcia Alcântara
Marcello Airoldi	Miguel Alcântara
Guilherme Leicam	Tito Torres
Juliana Knust	Maria Beatriz Pereira Andrade "Bia"
Murilo Rosa	Rubem Andrade "Binho"
André Gonçalves	Nilton Chagas
Letícia Birkheuer	Monique Machado
Solange Couto	Vanda de Souza
Eduardo Galvão	Jorge Almeida
Inez Vianna	Sueli Almeida
Lara Coutinho	Tainá Bentes
Manuela Llerena	Camila Magalhães
Thales Cavalcanti	Henrique Torres
Mari Oliveira	Vera
Enzo Romani	Pedro Torres
Paulo Hebrom	Bernardo Barbosa "BB"
Gabriel Borgongino	Gabriel Moraes "Moraes"
Joana Cardoso	Rafaela Loyola "Rafa"
Flávio Bauraqui	Samuel Matos Almeida
David Pinheiro	Idelfonso Beltrão
Kíria Malheiros	Marina Pereira Chagas
Vitor Figueiredo	Max Pereira Chagas
Mariana Costantini	Eneida Carneiro
Fabianna de Mello e Souza	Milena Gonçalves

=== Special appearances ===
Interpreter	Character
Júlia Ruiz	Diana
Cristina Lago	Piedad
Thierry Tremouroux	Valter Dubois
Ana Miranda	Sandra
Babu Santana	Reginaldo
Beto Nasci	Átila
Beto Simas	Capoeira Master
Bia Montez	Marilu
Bruno Ahmed	Zig
Bruno Hoffmann	Valentim
Camila Meurer	Gisela
Claudia Netto	Florinda Leão Pereira
Duda Mamberti	Sávio Chaves
Gabriel Mandergan	Jonas
Gustavo Ottoni	Romeu
Joana Kannenberg	Daniela "Dani"
João Velho	Marcos
João Vithor Oliveira	João Alcântara
Juliana Xavier	Selminha
Karine Mello	Márcia
Letícia Sabatella	Maria Loyola
Lilian Valeska	Ilza
Lucas Cosechen	Guará
Luciano Huck	Himself
Marcella Valente	Carmem
Marcos França	Luís
Marcos Frota	Menelau Mello
Marina Wilson	Martinha
Renata Dominguez	Suzana
Ricardo Duque	Marcos Rocha
Sofia Starling	Rita
Tarciana Saad	Marisa
Vinicius Olivo	Wagner
Vinicius Wester	Klaus
Willean Reis	Marquinhos
Yana Sardenberg	Carla
Ludmilla	Herself

== Season 24 ==
Interpreter	Character
Aline Dias	Joana Miranda Gomes Carvalho Soares
Barbara França	Bárbara Monteiro Carvalho Soares
Ricardo Vianna	Giovane Soares
Felipe Roque	Gabriel Soares
Juliano Laham	Rômulo Guerreiro Machado
Amanda de Godoi	Fernanda Tetel "Nanda"
Malu Falangola	Sula Maria Conceição Tavares
Caio Manhente	Fábio Souza
Milena Melo	Manuela Monteiro Carvalho
Bruno Guedes	Lucas Almeida
Cynthia Senek	Maria Cristina Manosso "Krica"
Bárbara Maia	Luíza Souza
Giulia Gayoso	Juliana Monteiro Carvalho
Marcos Pasquim	Ricardo Carvalho Gama
Deborah Secco	Tânia Souza
Thiago Fragoso	Caio Monteiro
Fábio Scalon	João Victor Dias "Jabá"
Gabriel Kaufmann	Artur Campelo
Duda Nagle	Vanderson da Silva "Vanderson Espada"
Oscar Magrini	Mário Jorge de Oliveira "Jorjão"
Louise Cardoso	Irene Soares de Oliveira
Joana Fomm	Maria Cleonice Soares "Cléo"
Nego do Borel	Cleyton da Silva
Valentina Bulc	Isabela Rochedo "Belinha"
Laryssa Ayres	Jéssica Ramos
Sérgio Malheiros	Roberto Belloto "Belloto"
Carlos Bonow	Marcio Correa
Malu Pizzatto	Marta Ramos "Martinha"
Nathalia Serra	Clara
Matheus Dias	Junior
Gabriel Montenegro	Diógenes "Dodô"
Paula Possani	Tita

=== Special appearances ===
Interpreter	Character
Jayme Matarazzo	Renato Gonçalves
Rômulo Neto	Romulo
Bruno Gissoni	João Antônio Miranda "Toninho"
Bárbara Paz	Stella
Jackson Antunes	Agenor Miranda
Stênio Garcia	Raimundo
Lucci Ferreira	Francisco Garcêz Lopez
Ilva Niño	Damiana Miranda "Vó Damiana"
Raquel Fabbri	Mônica
Zezeh Barbosa	Consuelo Tavares
Fernanda Pontes	Alicia
Alexandre Barros	Mauro
Ed Oliveira	Lopes
Cristiano Gualda	Flávio
Adriana Prado	Virginia Monteiro Carvalho
Pâmela Tomé	Alina Machado de Souza
Bruno Montaleone	Glauco
Gisela Reimann	Lúcia Ramos
Lívian Aragão	Júlia Porto
Gilberto Hernandez	Dante
Francisco Vitti	Filipe Tinoco
Marcelo Aquino	João
Eli Ferreira	Carmem Gomes
Hugo Moura	Rafael
Dayse Pozato	Marlene
Lucas Simões	Leonardo "Leo"
Isaías Barbosa	Zeca
Marcelo Gonçalves	Reinaldo
André Rosa	Young Ricardo
Giulliana Succine	Young Tania
Paola Riani	Marília de Barros
Ana Paula Lima	Andrea
Gabriel Mandergan	Alisson
Maurício Pitanga	Maurício
Hugo Moura	Rafael
Victor Sparapane	Jonathan
Paulo Hebrom	Bernardo Barbosa
Wilson Rabello	Oswaldo
Zé Júnior	Ortega
Tande	Himself
Shelda Bedê	Herself
Emanuel Rego	Himself
Fabi Oliveira	Herself

== Season 25 ==
Interpreter	Character
Gabriela Medvedovsky	Keyla Maria Romano "Key / K3"
Manoela Aliperti	Heloisa Gutierrez "Lica"
Daphne Bozaski	Benedita Teixeira Ramos "Benê"
Heslaine Vieira	Ellen Rodrigues
Ana Hikari	Cristina Ono Yamada "Tina"
Matheus Abreu	Teobaldo de Morais "Tato"
Juan Paiva	Anderson Rodrigues
Carol Macedo	Katiane Azevedo "K2"
Talita Younan	Katharine Xavier "K1"
Vinicius Wester	Michel Borovski Júnior "MB"
Bruno Gadiol	José Augusto Sampaio Neto "Guto"
Hall Mendes	João Augusto Mantovani "Jota"
Lucas Penteado	Francisco de Assis "Fio"
Giovanna Grigio	Samantha Lambertini
Gabriel Calamari	Felipe Soares Lacerda
Isabella Scherer	Clara Becker Gutierrez
Daniela Galli	Maria Luiza Becker Gutierrez "Malu"
Marcello Antony	Edgar Gutierrez
Lúcio Mauro Filho	Roney Romano
Aline Fanju	Josefina Teixeira Ramos
Ana Flavia Cavalcanti	Dóris Belink Bonfim
Mouhamed Harfouch	Bóris Belink
Malu Galli	Marta Gutierrez
Ângelo Antônio	Luís Becker
Luis Galves	Gabriel Império Romano
Mikael Marmorato	João Vítor Lopes "Juca"
Lina Agifu	Mitsuko Yamada
Carlos Takeshi	Noboru Yamada
Pablo Morais	Adalberto dos Santos "Deco"
Giovanni Gallo	Douglas Nascimento "Dogão"
Roberta Santiago	Helena da Silva Rodrigues "Nena"
Ju Colombo	Maria das Dores Rodrigues
Bruno Kott	Ernesto
Felipe Hintze	Moqueca
Ed Lopez Dassilva	Valdemar
Zezé Antônio	Gilvan
Séfora Rangel	Leide
Julie Kei	Telma Yamada
Davi Souza	Júlio César Teixeira Ramos "Julinho"
Danilo Castro de Souza	Antônio Romano de Morais dos Santos "Tonico"

=== Special appearances ===
Interpreter	Character
Marcelo Arnal	Rafael Gimenez "Rafa"
Maria Gabrielli Machado	Taís Daiane
Miguel Coelho	Mr. X
Rodrigo dos Santos	Flávio Guimarães
Vinícius Redd	False Deco
Fabio Beltrão	Max
Brenda Sabryna	Bianca
Gabriel Chadan	Cleiton Salles "MC Pimenta"
Alexandre Moreno	Vicente Rodrigues
Cláudio Jaborandy	Aldo de Morais
Daniel Ribeiro	Nestor dos Santos
Janaína Gaia	Odaiuá dos Santos
Dig Dutra	Kátia Xavier
José Karini	Roger Honório
Luciano Pontes	Cícero Ramos
Sidney Corrêa	Michel Borovski
Tatiana Tiburcio	Cristiane Pereira
Pedro Garcia Netto	José Augusto Sampaio Filho
Adriana Zattar	Simone Sampaio
Kazue Akisue	Yoko
Carolina Iecker	Child Keyla
Bruna Tatar	Júlia
Thais Belchior	Samira
Alan Rocha	Palito
Andrea Nascimento	Marina
Carolina Chalita	Maria Eduarda
Flávia Milioni	Ana Maria
João Lucas Romero	Décio
Josué Galinari	Pedro
Rodrigo França	Chemistry teacher
MC Guimê	Himself
Naydiane Lima	Larissa
Larisse	Sandy
Isaías Barbosa	Breno
Christiano Lima	Renan
Marcel Lima	Davi

== Season 26 ==
Interpreter	Character
Camila Morgado	Gabriela Santos
Alice Milagres	Maria Alice da Paz
Daniel Rangel	Alexandre Santos Fortes "Alex"
Rayssa Bratillieri	Pérola Mantovani
André Luiz Frambach	Márcio Porto
Joana Borges	Verena Dias
Eike Duarte	Álvaro Borges
Leonardo Bittencourt	Hugo Rabelo
Gabriel Contente	Felipe Kavaco "Kavaco"
Pally Siqueira	Amanda Garcia
Guilhermina Libanio	Úrsula Bartolomeu
Bruno Ahmed	Enzo Vilanova
Giovanna Rangel	Fabiana Mota
Tom Karabachian	Tito Laroche
Jeniffer Oliveira	Flora Santos Fortes
Giovanni Dopico	Santiago Paiva
Nila	Michael Müller
Gabriel Fuentes	Érico Melo
Yara Charry	Jade Poitier
Dora Freind	Bárbara Bartolomeu
Dhonata Augusto	Leandro de Jesus
Jeniffer Dias	Dandara Nogueira da Conceição
Luellem de Castro	Talíssia Costa
Pedro Maya	Carlos Aníbal Laroche "Garoto"
Julia Portes	Lia
Carmo Dalla Vecchia	Rafael Porto
Felipe Rocha	Paulo Fortes
Guta Stresser	Rosália da Paz
Luis Gustavo	Heitor Laroche
Arlindo Lopes	Getúlio Melo
Bianca Rinaldi	Leonor
Bukassa Kabengele	Marcelo da Conceição
Marianna Armellini	Brigitte Simões
Marcelo Argenta	Breno Ventura
André Luiz Miranda	Vínicius
Matheus Cunha	Peixe
Julia Mendes	Marli
Maria Rita Silva	Melissa Santos Fortes "Mel"
Maria Alice Guedes	Valentina Costa

=== Special appearances ===
Interpreter	Character
Fernanda Paes Leme	Solange Pelegrino
Ana Beatriz Nogueira	Isadora Mantovani
Edson Celulari	Eduardo Mantovani
Malu Mader	Melissa Kavaco
Daniel Dantas	Jairo Kavaco
Aracy Balabanian	Janete Kavaco
Miguel Rômulo	Marcos Almeida "Marquinhos"
Ângelo Paes Leme	Tarcísio Porto
Miriam Freeland	Catarina
Christian Figueiredo	Gutuber
Fabiana Karla	Penha da Paz
Juliana Alves	Lorraine
Lady Francisco	Lorraine's Mother
Betty Faria	Olívia
Vera Fischer	Ana Tanquerey
Jackson Antunes	Lourenço Paiva
Nicette Bruno	Estela Santos
Flávio Migliaccio	Roberto Santos
Débora Lamm	Nina Burana
Marcelo Adnet	Davi Castell
Alexandre Moreno	Jeremias
Guilherme Weber	Régis Borges
Cláudio Lins	Osvaldo Rabelo
Giselle Batista	Raíssa
Carla Diaz	Clarissa
Arthur Aguiar	Fábio
Ana Paula Bouzas	Violeta Melo
Arianne Botelho	Bia
Babu Santana	Aloísio
Bella Piero	Sofia
Letícia Isnard	Juliana Dias
Charles Paraventi	Tobias
Gorete Milagres	Elizabeth Müller "Beth"
Laila Garin	Tânia Borges
Ellen Rocche	Jaqueline Mota "Jaque"
Georgiana Góes	Lúcia
Jaime Leibovitch	Norton
Márcio Vito	Rian
Rita Guedes	Valéria
Lorena Comparato	Camila
Dani Ornellas	Simone Costa
Gustavo Ottoni	Bernardo
Vinícius Redd	Anderson
Carlos Fonte Boa	Mark
Vanessa Pascale	Manuela "Manu"
Vanessa Bueno	Larissa
Carla Cristina Cardoso	Yasmin
João Velho	César
Paulo Verlings	Calebe
Kika Kalache	Marisa de Jesus
Daniel Ribeiro	Antônio de Jesus "Tom"
Giovana Cordeiro	Maria Carolina Lima "Carol"
Larissa Bracher	Eliane Cruz
Cristina Mullins	Director
Dja Marthins	Maria Alice's aunt
Hugo Resende	Edson
Ghilherme Lobo	Luís
Josie Antello	Quitéria
Pedro Garcia Netto	José Augusto Sampaio
Gabriel Moura	Julinho
Hugo Germano	Jorge Costa
Gabriela Freire	Meg
João Pedro Oliveira	João Pedro
Renata Gasparim	Lu
Clarissa Muller	Ana Cruz
Sérgio Maciel	Antônio
Léo Israel	Neto
Gabriel Antunes	Luca
Gabriela Loran	Priscila
Diego Goullart	Cláudio
Gilberto Miranda	Fábio
Renan Monteiro	Selmo
Ruan Aguiar	Vagner
Diogo Monteiro	Bryan
Diogo Tarre	Deivide
Rafael Bravo	Charlie
Carolina Lopez	Iohana
Shirley Cruz	Joana
Julia Lund	Ellen
Rodrigo Rangel	Edgar
Renan Mayer	Rei
Cristiano Sauma	Mateus Barbieri
João Cordella	Vitor
Alexandre Lino	Amaro
Danilo Maia	Naldo
Vitor Mayer	Vitor
Luciano Pullig	Virgílio
Adriana Machado	Isabela
Antônio Alves	Dênis
Bella Camero	Soninha
Andréa Beltrão	Herself
Otaviano Costa	Himself
Nando Reis	Himself
Naiara Azevedo	Herself
Buchecha	Himself

== Season 27 ==
Interpreter	Character
Alanis Guillen	Rita Gomes Moraes
Pedro Novaes	Filipe Pinheiro Henriques
Caroline Dallarosa	Angela Mello dos Santos "Anjinha"
Gabriel Santana	Cléber Braga
Gabz	Jaqueline Pereira Nobre
Rômulo Arantes Neto	Rui Guedes
Jade Cardozo	Leila Ferreira
Danilo Maia	Thiago Monteiro Paixão
Pedro Alves	Gustavo Andrade Fonseca "Guga"
João Pedro Oliveira	Sérgio Antunes Viana "Serginho"
Dora de Assis	Raíssa Monteiro Paixão
Gabriella Mustafá	Fernanda Silveira Maranhão "Nanda"
Benjamin Damini	Marta Magalhães "Martinha"
André Matarazzo	Marcos Lima "Marquinhos"
Giovanna Rispoli	Milena Nobre
João Fernandes	Tadeu
Paloma Duarte	Lígia Pinheiro Henriques
Joaquim Lopes	Joaquim Henriques
Henri Castelli	Carlos Madureira
Mariana Santos	Carla Paixão
Júlio Machado	Marco Rodrigo dos Santos
Christine Fernandes	Karina Nobre
Tato Gabus Mendes	César Nobre
Rosanne Mulholland	Lara Pinheiro
Giulia Bertolli	Meg Peixoto
Ronald Sotto	Marlos Antunes Viana "Camelo"
Caian Zattar	Arthur Rabelo "Tatoo"
John Buckley	Beto
Thiago Genini	Bill Clinton
Roberto Bomtempo	Max Fonseca
Karine Teles	Regina Fonseca
Hugo Moura	Daniel
Fhelipe Gomes	Diego
Olívia Araújo	Vânia Pereira
Roger Gobeth	Luiz Peixoto
Ana Miranda	Margarida Antunes Viana
Quitéria Kelly	Neide Castilho
André Ramiro	Celso
Valquíria Ribeiro	Marina Moura
Lavínia Miranda	Carolina Pinheiro Henriques "Nina" / Ana Gomes Moraes Guedes

=== Special appearances ===
Interpreter	Character
Joelson Medeiros	Genival Lopes Moraes
Tony Nogueira	Cauã Fernandes
Junno Andrade	Carlos Viana
Milton Gonçalves	Douglas
Anja Bittencourt	Isaura do Nascimento
Ana Carbatti	Lúcia Silva
Nelson Freitas	Montenegro
Ricardo Martins	Rugieri
Hugo Resende	Petrônio
Gláucio Gomes	Juarez
José Augusto Branco	Priest Lucas
Duda Santos	Paula
Ludmilla	Herself
Fernanda Gentil	Herself
Fabiana Karla	Herself
Érico Brás	Himself
Lellê	Herself
Sophia Abrahão	Herself
