= Órfãos da Terra =

- Also known as: Orphans of a Nation
- Genre: Telenovela
- Created by: Duca Rachid; Thelma Guedes
- Written by: Aimar Labaki; Carolina Ziskind; Cristina Biscaia; Dora Castellar
- Directed by: André Câmara
- Starring: Julia Dalavia; Renato Góes; Alice Wegmann; Carmo Dalla Vecchia; Rodrigo Simas; Anajú Dorigon; Kaysar Dadour; Emanuelle Araújo; Danton Mello; Bia Arantes; Guilherme Fontes; Leona Cavalli; Ana Cecília Costa; Marco Ricca; Carol Castro
- Opening theme: "Diáspora" by Tribalistas
- Country of origin: Brazil
- Original languages: Portuguese; Arabic
- No. of episodes: 154 (90 International version)

Production
- Producers: Renata Rossi; César Nogueira; Maria Fernanda Mocellin; Carlos Eduardo Estrella; Paula Loffler
- Production locations: São Paulo, Brazil; Fardus, Syria; Beirut, Lebanon
- Cinematography: Guto Leccioli
- Editors: Diogo Ribeiro; Chris Moura; Flavia Celestino; Sergio Reinaldo
- Camera setup: Multi-camera
- Running time: 45 minutes
- Production company: Estúdios Globo

Original release
- Network: TV Globo
- Release: 2 April – 27 September 2019

Órfãos da Terra (English: Orphans of a Nation) is a Brazilian telenovela produced and broadcast by TV Globo, from 2 April 2019 to 27 September 2019. The telenovela is written by Duca Rachid and Thelma Guedes, with Dora Castellar, Aimar Labaki, Carolina Ziskind and Cristina Biscay as co-writers. It is directed by André Câmara and Gustavo Fernandez, and co-directed by Pedro Peregrino, Bruno Safadi, Alexandre Macedo and Lúcio Tavares.

It stars Julia Dalavia, Renato Góes, Alice Wegmann, Carmo Dalla Vecchia and Rodrigo Simas in the main roles.

The telenovela addresses the refugee crisis around the world, and the displaced Lebanese Brazilians living in São Paulo since the 20th century.

In 2020, the show won the International Emmy Award for Best Telenovela.

== Plot ==
After being victims of a bombing in Syria, Missade (Ana Cecília Costa) and Elias (Marco Ricca) flee to Lebanon with their children, Khaled, a boy who was injured, and Laila (Julia Dalavia) - who agrees to marry a powerful sheikh, Aziz Abdallah (Herson Capri) in exchange for money to pay for his brother's treatment. However, when Khaled dies, Laila escapes to Brazil with her parents. After realizing this, the sheikh sends after her Jammil (Renato Góes), a man of his trust and fiancee of his daughter, Dalila Abdallah (Alice Wegmann). Inevitably Laila and Jammil fall in love and become fugitives. Aziz also decides to go to Brazil to make sure his marriage with Laila is fulfilled. Mysteriously, Aziz is murdered, to which his daughter, Dalila, goes to Brazil with a plan to get revenge on Jammil and Laila.

== Cast ==
- Julia Dalavia as Laila Faiek
- Renato Góes as Jammil Zarif
- Alice Wegmann as Dalila Abdallah / Basma Bakri
- Carmo Dalla Vecchia as Paul Abbás
- Rodrigo Simas as Bruno Monte Castelli
- Anajú Dorigon as Camila Nasser
- Kaysar Dadour as Fauze
- Emanuelle Araújo as Zuleika Nasser
- Danton Mello as Antonio Carlos Almeida (Delegado Almeidinha)
- Bia Arantes as Valéria Augusta
- Guilherme Fontes as Norberto Monte Castelli
- Leona Cavalli as Teresa Monte Castelli
- Ana Cecília Costa as Missade Faiek
- Marco Ricca as Elias Faiek
- Carol Castro as Dr. Helena Torquato
- Eliane Giardini as Rânia Anssarah Nasser
- Paulo Betti as Miguel Nasser
- Bruno Cabrerizo as Hussein Zarif
- Allan Souza Lima as Youssef Abdallah
- Veronica Debom as Sara Roth Fischer / Maria
- Marcelo Médici as Abner Blum
- Mouhamed Harfouch as Ali Al Aud
- Luana Martau as Latifa
- André Coimbra as Padre Zoran
- Simone Gutierrez as Aline Nasser Batista
- Guilhermina Libanio as Cibele Nasser
- Filipe Bragança as Benjamin Nasser Batista
- Glicério do Rosário as Caetano Batista
- Nicette Bruno as Ester Blum
- Osmar Prado as Bóris Fischer
- Betty Gofman as Eva Roth Fischer
- Flávio Migliaccio as Mamede Al Aud
- Paula Burlamaqui as Dr. Letícia Monteiro
- Eduardo Mossri as Dr. Faruq Murad
- Vitor Thiré as Davi Roth Fischer
- Blaise Musipère as Jean-Baptiste
- Eli Ferreira as Marie Patchou
- Ana Guasque as Mágida Hadi
- Lola Fanucchi as Muna Al Aud
- Leandro Firmino as Detetive Tomás
- Luciano Salles as Dr. Rogério Pessoa
- Darília Oliveira as Aida Abdallah
- Yasmin Garcez as Fairouz Abdallah
- Cristiane Amorim as Santinha
- Gabi Costa as Nazira Murad
- Rafael Sun as Arthur Nasser Batista (Arthurzinho)
- Letícia Carnaval as Yasmin Hadi / Yasmin Nasser Batista
- Sophia Roffe as Hadije
- Max Lima as Martim

=== Guest cast ===
- Herson Capri as Sheik Aziz Abdallah
- Letícia Sabatella as Soraia Anssarah Abdallah
- Rodrigo Vidal as Khaled Faiek
- Alexandre Moreno as Delegado Evandro
- Raquel Fabbri as Estela
- Rafael Sieg as Rodrigo Torquato
- Beatrice Sayd as Samira
- Álvaro Brandão as Ahmed
- Thales Miranda as Arthurzinho (5 years old)

== Soundtrack ==
Órfãos da Terra (Trilha Sonora da Novela)

Soundtrack album by Various artists
- Released: 31 May 2019
- Length: 55:01
- Label: Som Livre

Órfãos da Terra (Trilha Sonora da Novela) is the soundtrack of the telenovela, released on 31 May 2019 by Som Livre.

No.	Title	Artist(s)	Length
1.	"Diáspora"	Tribalistas	4:02
2.	"La Bel Haki"	Adonis	4:29
3.	"Algo Parecido"	Skank	3:45
4.	"As Mina De Sampa"	Rita Lee	3:41
5.	"Qué Vendrá"	Zaz	2:59
6.	"Sister"	Tracey Thorn & Corinne Bailey Rae	8:32
7.	"Todo Dia"	Roberta Campos	3:55
8.	"Onde Deus Possa Me Ouvir"	Ana Vilela	4:02
9.	"Where Light Pours In"	Gustavo Bertoni	3:34
10.	"Apenas Mais Uma de Amor"	Vanessa da Mata	2:55
11.	"Depressa A Vida Passa"	Renato Braz	4:52
12.	"Ya Taier Sallamli Ktir"	Sami Bordokan	1:53
13.	"Raksit Leila"	Mashrou' Leila	1:56
14.	"Longe de Mim (La Bel Haki)"	Tiê	4:26
Total length:			55:01

== Ratings ==
Season	Timeslot (BRT/AMT)	Episodes	First aired		Last aired		Avg. viewers (points)
Season	Timeslot (BRT/AMT)	Episodes	Date	Viewers (in points)	Date	Viewers (in points)	Avg. viewers (points)
1	Mon–Sat 6:15 p.m.	154	2 April 2019	22	27 September 2019	25	21.8

== Awards and nominations ==
Year	Award	Category	Nominated	Result	Ref.
2019	Rose d'Or	Best Telenovela	Duca Rachid & Thelma Guedes	Won	
2019	Troféu APCA	Best Telenovela	Duca Rachid & Thelma Guedes	Nominated	
2019	Troféu APCA	Best Actor	Flávio Migliaccio	Won	
2019	Troféu APCA	Best Actor	Herson Capri	Nominated	
2019	Melhores do Ano	Best Actor in Telenovela	Renato Góes	Nominated	
2019	Melhores do Ano	Best Actress in Telenovela	Alice Wegmann	Nominated	
2019	Melhores do Ano	Best Revelation Actor	Kaysar Dadour	Won	
2020	Seoul International Drama Awards	Grand Prize	Duca Rachid & Thelma Guedes	Won	
2020	International Emmy Award	Best Telenovela	Duca Rachid & Thelma Guedes	Won	
