= Bela, a Feia =

Brazilian Telenovela

- Bela a Feia poster
- Also known as: Ugly Bela
- Genre: Telenovela
- Based on: Yo soy Betty, la fea by Fernando Gaitán
- Written by: Emílio Boechat, Alessandra Colassanti, Denise Crispun and others
- Directed by: Edson Spinello, Rudi Lagemann, Leonardo Miranda
- Starring: Giselle Itié; Bruno Ferrari; Simone Spoladore; Carla Regina; Iran Malfitano; Sílvia Pfeifer; Jonas Bloch; Luíza Tomé; Raul Gazolla; Bárbara Borges; Laila Zaid; Thierry Figueira; André Mattos; Ângela Leal; Benvindo Sequeira
- Opening theme: "Bela, a Feia" (Ultraje a Rigor)
- Country of origin: Brazil
- Original language: Portuguese
- No. of episodes: 217 (205 International version)

Production
- Producer: Rede Record

Original release
- Network: RecordTV
- Release: August 4, 2009 – June 2, 2010

Bela, a Feia (Ugly Bela) is a Brazilian telenovela originally aired on Rede Record from August 4, 2009, to June 2, 2010. A co-production with Televisa, it was based on the Colombian telenovela Yo soy Betty, la fea, as well as the American series Ugly Betty.

On June 1, 2010, the penultimate episode of Bela, a Feia made Record lead the audience ratings against Rede Globo in both São Paulo and Rio de Janeiro, a feat rarely achieved in Brazilian television viewership.

== Plot ==
Bela is a competent and hardworking young woman who has a good academic background but cannot find a job because she looks ugly. In childhood Bela formed a humorous duo with Dinho, in which his ugliness was always the reason for the debauchery and jokes, being run by the boy's father, Ataufo. The two fled with the money they received from the shows and spent their lives scamming people and avoiding arrest with various disguises and identities. She lives in Gamboa, Rio de Janeiro, along with her father Clemente and siblings Max and Elvira - a hairdresser who works at her uncle Haroldo's salon. She lives in a comical war with her rival, Magdalena, who is also a local hairdresser and the two spend their days sabotaging to prove who is the best professional.

While Bela and Elvira are daughters of Clemente's late wife, Max is the son of an earlier romance with Samantha, a woman who lives in Copacabana and despises her son, being married to womanizer Armando and having daughter Ludmila, a girl who deems poverty a horror.

Bela gets a job at the + / Brazil advertising agency and becomes the secretary of the president, Rodrigo, falling in love with him as soon as she meets him, and receiving the contempt of other employees for her appearance. The publicist is the son of the owner of the company, Ricardo, and has great resentment for his mother, Vera, for believing he was abandoned by her when he was 4 years old. She, in fact, does not live abroad but is being held in private prison in a country house for 25 years by Ricardo, who threatens to reveal a grave secret from the past if she decides to return.

Rodrigo is engaged to the arrogant Cíntia, who mistreats the boy's housekeeper, Olga for covering up the boy's betrayals, unaware that the maid is his real mother. Rodrigo's biggest ordeal is the calculator Adriano, vice-president who dreams of one day taking over the leadership of + / Brazil and plans every step to topple him and show that the boy is incompetent, being there only for being the owner's son.

At the company, Diogo, who lives with Diego, a young man who does not understand his sexuality yet, has an affair with an older woman who supports him, although he is attracted to his flatmate. Diego is afraid to admit to himself that he is in love with another man, although Diogo has always made it clear that he is ready to have a relationship with him when he understands his sexuality.

The other secretary of the place, the cunning Veronica, does everything to stand out and has the alliance of Adriano and Cíntia to be able to rise within the company and get a prominent position. As time goes by Rodrigo gets closer and closer to Bela and falls in love with her, regardless of her appearance, but the romance is hindered by Veronica, who creates a trap to kill the girl at the request of Cíntia.

Although everyone believes that Bela really died, she is saved by Vera, who decides to transform her appearance so that she becomes a beautiful woman and returns, unrecognizable, to the company under the pseudonym Valentina, representing her actions directly in the presidency and taking revenge on those who despised her before revealing true identity.

== Cast ==
Actor	Role
Giselle Itié	Anabela Palhares (Bela) / Valentina Carvalho
Bruno Ferrari	Rodrigo Ávila
Simone Spoladore	Verônica Matoso
Iran Malfitano	Adriano Gomes Ávila
Carla Cabral	Cíntia Alcântara
Sílvia Pfeifer	Vera Ávila
Jonas Bloch	Ricardo Ávila
Bárbara Borges	Elvira Palhares (Vivi)
Laila Zaid	Magdalena Fonseca
André Mattos	Ataulfo Aguiar
Thierry Figueira	Alfredo Aguiar (Dinho)
Ângela Leal	Olga Santos
Benvindo Sequeira	Clemente Palhares
Esther Góes	Bárbara Gomes Ávila
Luíza Tomé	Samantha Freitas
Raul Gazolla	Armando Freitas (Armandinho)
Denise Del Vecchio	Vanda Alcântara
Daniel Erthal	Diego Souza
Sérgio Menezes	Diogo Marques
Bia Montez	Hortência Peixoto
Roberta Gualda	Luzia Caldas
Cláudio Gabriel	Nelson Barbosa (Nelsinho)
João Camargo	Haroldo Palhares
Rafael Primot	Ícaro Pereira da Silva
Raquel Nunes	Investigadora Marcia Sales
Alexandre Barillari	Investigador Douglas Nogueira
Henri Pagnoncelli	Ariosto Alcântara
Marcela Barrozo	Ludmila Freitas
Sérgio Hondjakoff	Maximiliano Freitas Palhares (Max)
Gabriela Moreyra	Natália Brito
Pérola Faria	Juliana Barros
Oberdan Júnior	Jacinto Garcia (Jaça)
André Segatti	Ivo Alencar
Daniel Aguiar	Augusto Gomes Ávila (Guto)
Alice Assef	Tânia Silveira
Natália Guimarães	Mariana Cunha
Ildi Silva	Dinorá Melo
Débora Gomez	Camila Pinho
Camila Guebur	Sheyla Valadares
Aracy Cardoso	Regina Brito
Sabrina Rosa	Carminha
Suzana Abranches	Léa
Maria Cristina Gatti	Berenice
Bruna Griphao	Ana Clara Faria (Aninha)
Vinícius Moreno	Lucas Crisaldi
Kaic Chagas	Victor Hugo Fonseca

=== Special participation ===
Ator	Personagem
Cláudio Heinrich	Rodolfo Brummer (Dolfinho)
Catarina Abdalla	Raimunda Pereira da Silva
Rômulo Estrela	Fábio
Rômulo Neto	Matheus Albuquerque
Viviane Araújo	Morena
Gracyanne Barbosa	Shayene
Daniel Andrade	Bernardo
Mário Frias	Gastão
Franciely Freduzeski	Júlia
Luciele di Camargo	Úrsula
Eduardo Semerjian	Daniel Parker
Gustavo Ottoni	Promotor Vargas
Hélio Ribeiro	Dr. Érico Sepúlveda
Ilya São Paulo	Prosecutor who reopens case against Ricardo
Anderson Lima	Pivete
Paulo Giardini	Deputy
Ricardo Pavão	Alberto Ávila
Kelly Eshima	Midori
Ludmilla Cordeiro	Noêmia
Anita Terrana	Inês
Nilvan Santos	Euzébio Rocha
Sidy Correa	Dr. Rubens
Créo Kellab	Basílio do Bueiro
Luccas Bernardes	Ludmila's friend
Marcelo Borghi	Deputy
Eduardo Lassah	Olga's doctor
Tathy Rio	Armando's friend
Ana Hickmann	Herself
Rodrigo Faro	Himself
Sérgio Mallandro	Himself
Neguinho da Beija-Flor	Himself
Cine	Themselves
Banda Djavú	Themselves
Bruno Pego	Clemente (young)
Estephane Raimunda	Bela (child)
Thiago Chagas	Dinho (child)
