= Gaúcho Negro =

1991 film directed by Jessel Buss

- Directed by: Jessel Buss
- Written by: Milton Barragan; Carlos Alberto Diniz; Tony Rabatoni; Yoya Wursch
- Produced by: Diler Trindade
- Starring: Gaúcho da Fronteira; Letícia Spiller; Juliana Baroni; Cláudio Heinrich; Xuxa
- Cinematography: Nonato Estrela
- Music by: André Sperling
- Production companies: Xuxa Produçoes; Dreamvision; Art Films; Columbia Pictures
- Distributed by: Art Films; Columbia Pictures
- Release date: 1991
- Running time: 80 minutes
- Country: Brazil
- Language: Portuguese

Gaúcho Negro (English: Black Gaucho) is a 1991 Brazilian romantic adventure film, directed by Jessel Buss.

== Plot ==
In Rio Grande do Sul, cattle theft and criminal burning torment the farmers until the Gaúcho Negro appears, a masked knight, a mixture of legend and vigilante.

== Cast ==
- Gaúcho da Fronteira
- Letícia Spiller .... Adriana
- Cláudio Heinrich .... João
- Xuxa .... Narrator
- Juliana Baroni
- Gabriel de Paula.... Gaúcho
- Egon Júnior
- Isabela Silveira
- Jimmy Pipiolo
- Pinduca Gomes

== See also ==
- List of Brazilian films of the 1990s
