= Somos tão Jovens =

2013 film directed by Antonio Carlos da Fontoura

We're So Young
- Directed by: Antônio Carlos da Fontoura
- Starring: Thiago Mendonça
- Music by: Carlos Trilha
- Production company: Canto Claro Produções Artísticas
- Distributed by: Imagem Filmes; Fox Film do Brasil
- Release date: May 3, 2013
- Country: Brazil
- Language: Portuguese
- Budget: R$6.4 million
- Box office: R$18,253,649

We're So Young (Portuguese: Somos tão Jovens) is a 2013 Brazilian biographical drama film about Brazilian rock singer Renato Russo. The film does not follow Russo's entire life, instead focusing on his adolescence, his physical problems and the discovery of his love for music. It is directed by Antônio Carlos da Fontoura, written by Marcos Bernstein and starring Thiago Mendonça and Laila Zaid. It was released in Brazilian theaters by distributors Imagem Filmes and Fox Film on May 3, 2013.

== Plot ==
In 1973, the Manfredini family moved from Rio to Brasília. Renato, suffered from a rare bone disease, the epiphysiolysis and after surgery he was in need of a wheelchair. Forced to stay at home and being treated with morphine, the young man began to project his plans to become the greatest rock star of Brazil, creating, later, the group Aborto Elétrico, becoming the "Loner Troubadour" and later, forming and fronting the popular alternative rock band Legião Urbana.

== Cast ==
- Thiago Mendonça as Renato Russo
- Laila Zaid as Ana Cláudia
- Sandra Corveloni as Carminha
- Marcos Breda as Dr. Renato
- Bianca Comparato as Carmem Teresa
- Bruno Torres as Fê Lemos
- Daniel Passi as Flávio Lemos
- Conrado Godoy as Marcelo Bonfá
- Nicolau Villa-Lobos as Dado Villa-Lobos
- Sérgio Dalcin as André Pretorius
- Ibsen Perucci as Dinho Ouro Preto
- Olívia Torres as Gabriela
- Kotoe Karasawa as Suzy
- Nathalia Lima Verde as Helena
- Henrique Pires as Carlos Alberto
- André de Carvalho as Tony
- Vitor Bonfá as Loro Jones
- Victor Carballar as Philippe Seabra
- Kael Studart as Andi
- Waldomiro Alves as Feijão
- Leonardo Villas Braga as Hermano Vianna
- Edu Moraes as Herbert Vianna
- Natasha Stransky as Teresa
- René Machado as Ico Ouro Preto
- Daniel Granieri as Zeca

== Production ==
Initially, the idea was to make a documentary about the life of Renato Russo. In 1999, producer Luiz Fernando Borges presented the project to the Manfredini family and received permission to start it. In 2005, the idea of a documentary was changed, and a feature film was already being produced, now under the command of Antonio Fontoura. In mid-2009, part of the cast was confirmed, and filming began only in 2011 in Brasília. Later, Paulínia and the University of Campinas were filming locations.
