= Irving São Paulo =

Brazilian actor (1964–2006)

José Irving Santana São Paulo (October 26, 1964 – August 10, 2006) was a Brazilian actor.

Born in Feira de Santana, Bahia, Irving São Paulo was the son of Brazilian director Olney São Paulo. He had been active in both television and films since the late 1970s.

He was diagnosed with necrotizing pancreatitis and hospitalized in the Copa D'Or hospital in Rio de Janeiro, Brazil on July 31, 2006. He died from multiple organ failure in Rio de Janeiro on August 10, 2006 at the age of 41. Left two sons, Johann Irving Luporini São Paulo (02/10/1983) and Luiz Henrique de Magalhães Dias Coelho São Paulo (02/05/1985). His brother Ilya São Paulo was also an actor.

== Filmography ==
- A Noiva da Cidade (1978)
- Muito Prazer (1979) as Leleu
- Luz del Fuego (1982)
- Final Feliz (1982-1983, TV Series) as Rafael
- Champagne (1983-1984, TV Series) as Zé Rodolfo
- Bebê a Bordo (1988-1989, TV Series) as Bad Cat
- Assim na Tela Como no Céu (1990) as Espírito Santo
- A História de Ana Raio e Zé Trovão (1990-1991, TV Series) as Minho
- Perigosas Peruas (1992, TV Series) as Johan
- Mulheres de Areia (1993, TV Series) as Zé Luís
- A Viagem (1994, TV Series) as José Carlos Barbosa (Zeca)
- Você Decide (1995-1998, TV Series) as Valdecir
- Torre de Babel (1998-1999, TV Series) as Gilberto (uncredited)
- A Muralha (2000, TV Mini-Series)
- Cascalho (2004)
- Um Só Coração (2004, TV Mini-Series) as Geraldo Ferraz
- O Veneno da Madrugada (2005) as Ruy Guerra (final film role)
