= Cláudio Heinrich =

Brazilian actor (born 1972)

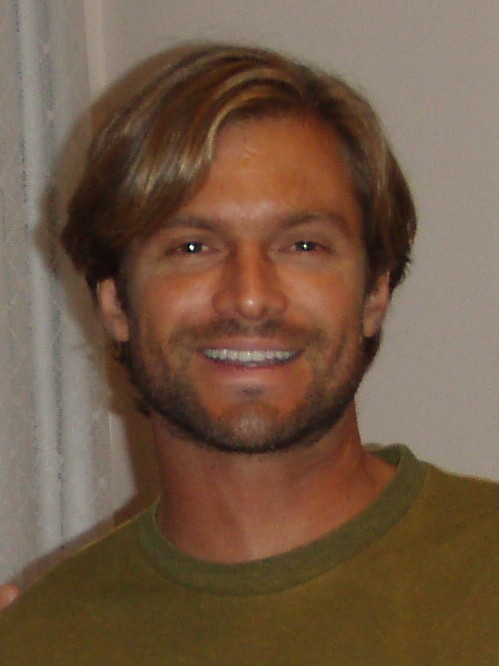
- Born: Cláudio Heinrich Meier; November 20, 1972 (age 53); Rio de Janeiro, Brazil
- Occupations: Actor, Brazilian jiu-jitsu instructor
- Years active: 1990-present

Cláudio Heinrich (born November 20, 1972) is a Brazilian film and television actor and Brazilian jiu-jitsu instructor.

== Biography ==
Cláudio Heinrich was born in Rio de Janeiro. He is of Swiss descent. In 2014, he became a Brazilian jiu-jitsu instructor.

== Complete filmography ==
| Year | Title | Role | Notes |
|---|---|---|---|
| 1990 | Sonho de Verão | Himself | |
| 1991 | Gaúcho Negro | João | |
| 1999 | Xuxa Requebra | Claudio | |
| 2003 | Xuxa Abracadabra | Príncipe Encantado | |
| 2004 | Didi Quer Ser Criança | Felipe | |

== Television jobs ==
| Year | Title | Role | Notes |
|---|---|---|---|
| 1995–1997 | Malhação | Dado | |
| 1998 | Era uma Vez... | Frederico 'Filé' Reis | |
| 2000–2001 | Uga-Uga | Tatuapu / Adriano Karabastos | |
| 2001 | Brava Gente | Beto | |
| 2002 | Coração de Estudante | Gustavo Brandão (Baú) | |
| 2005–2006 | Prova de Amor | Rafael Avelar | |
| 2007–2008 | Caminhos do Coração | Danilo Mayer | |
| 2008–2009 | Os Mutantes: Caminhos do Coração | Danilo Mayer | |
| 2010 | Bela, a Feia | Rodolffo | |
| 2011–2012 | Vidas em Jogo | Elton Fontoura de Melo | |
| 2013–2014 | Pecado Mortal | Paulo Noronha | |
| 2023 | No Limite | Contestant | |
