= Antônio Pedro =

Brazilian actor (1940–2023)

António Pedro
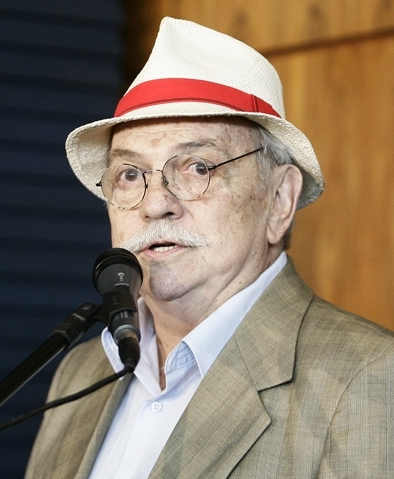
- Pedro in 2011
- Born: 11 November 1940; Rio de Janeiro, Brazil
- Died: 12 March 2023 (aged 82); Rio de Janeiro, Brazil

Antônio Pedro Borges de Oliveira (11 November 1940 – 12 March 2023) was a Brazilian actor, comedian, stage director and playwright, whose career spanned over six decades.

== Life and career ==
Born in Rio de Janeiro, Pedro started his career as an actor and assistant director in 1960. Initially only active on stage, in 1969 Pedro made his television debut in the Rede Tupi telenovela Super Plá, and became popular in the 1970s thanks to his participation in numerous TV Globo telenovelas, starting from O Bofe (1972). In 1989 he created the comedy alter ego Bicalho for the Chico Anysio Show, a character he successfully reprised for several seasons of the 1990s show Escolinha do Professor Raimundo.

Pedro also participated in films, TV children shows and in several seasons of the popular comedy show Zorra Total; on stage, he directed the Chico Buarque-penned stage musical Os Saltimbancos, produced and directed numerous plays, and was a key figure in the theatrical genre of besteirol. In the 1980s and 1990s, he served as Municipal Secretary of Culture in Rio de Janeiro and later in Volta Redonda. His last appearance was in the 2021 mini-series Filhas de Eva. He died on 12 March 2023, at the age of 82. He was the father of actresses Ana Baird and Alice Borges.
