= Guilherme Berenguer =

Brazilian actor (born 1980)

- Born: Guilherme Berenguer Santiago; September 20, 1980 (age 45); Recife, Pernambuco, Brazil
- Occupation: Actor
- Years active: 2003–2014
- Spouse: Bianca Cardoso (m. 2009)
- Children: 2
- Website: Official website

Guilherme Berenguer Santiago (/ɡiːˈljɛərmi/ ghee-LYAIR-mee; born September 20, 1980) is a Brazilian actor, best known for his roles in Malhação (2004) as Gustavo and Bang Bang (2005) as Neon.

== Early life ==
As a child, Guillerme liked to engage in street theater with his friends. At age fourteen, not having a good physique, he decided to lose weight, and started taking part in sports. He continues to enjoy sports like swimming and running.

== Personal life ==
On June 11, 2009, the actor married the psychologist Bianca Cardoso. On May 22, 2013, his first son, Sebastian, was born. He is evangelical, and says that he is not afraid to show it as he says: "Of course, if people ask what I do in order to keep my life in balance, where I seek that strength, I will say it without fear. The time in which being evangelic was seen as something silly or limited is long gone."

== Career ==
Then in 1998, he decided to move to the city of São Paulo, in search of better artistic opportunities, he joined an agency, advertising such as magazine covers, parades, TV propaganda. Thus, participated in the Group of Theater of USP, worked like professor of English. The repercussion of the work as a model brought him the opportunity to go to Japan, where he was invited to carry out more campaigns. When it returned to Brazil, it did another course of theater, in São Paulo, Theater School Célia Helena participated of two theatrical pieces, one of them "Desce do muro moleca" and a film short film called "De morango".

He participated in several tests to enter Malhação, until he was chosen to represent the role of Gustavo, protagonist of the series, in 2004. This role gave him great impetus in his career in Brazil and Portugal. Since then he has moved to Rio de Janeiro. He participated in the telenovela Bang Bang as Neon Bullock. And also participated of Sinhá Moça, like Eduardo Tavares. After the soap opera ended in 2006, Guilherme was invited to present the Globo Ecologia. In 2007, Guilherme dedicated himself to Globo Ecologia and his film school. In 2008 he returned to telenovelas like Lieutenant João Teixeira, in Desejo Proibido. In 2009 gave life to the young publicist Ricardo Bidauska, who after frustrated attempts in search of work in Rio de Janeiro, decides to go to the city of his friend pawn. On November 4, 2010, he signed a contract with RecordTV and starred in the novel Vidas em Jogo. In 2014 he moved to Los Angeles, where he began to study cinema, which ended up making his contract with the station not renewed.
