= Blaise Musipère =

Congolese actor (born 1986)

- Born: 15 May 1986 (age 39); Kinshasa
- Occupations: actor, basketball player
- Notable work: Órfãos da Terra

Blaise Musipère (born 15 May 1986 in Kinshasa) is a Congolese actor and former basketball player.

He was forced to leave his country due to the civil war and eventually made his way Brazil. There, he worked various jobs to make ends meet until he was able to begin his acting career.

== Filmography ==
=== Television ===
- 2013: Malhação
- 2019: Órfãos da Terra as Jean-Baptiste, a Haitian refugee

=== Film ===
- 2011: Memórias do Meu Tio as a gangster
- 2012: Pra ser feliz as Raúl
