= Laila Zaid =

Brazilian actress

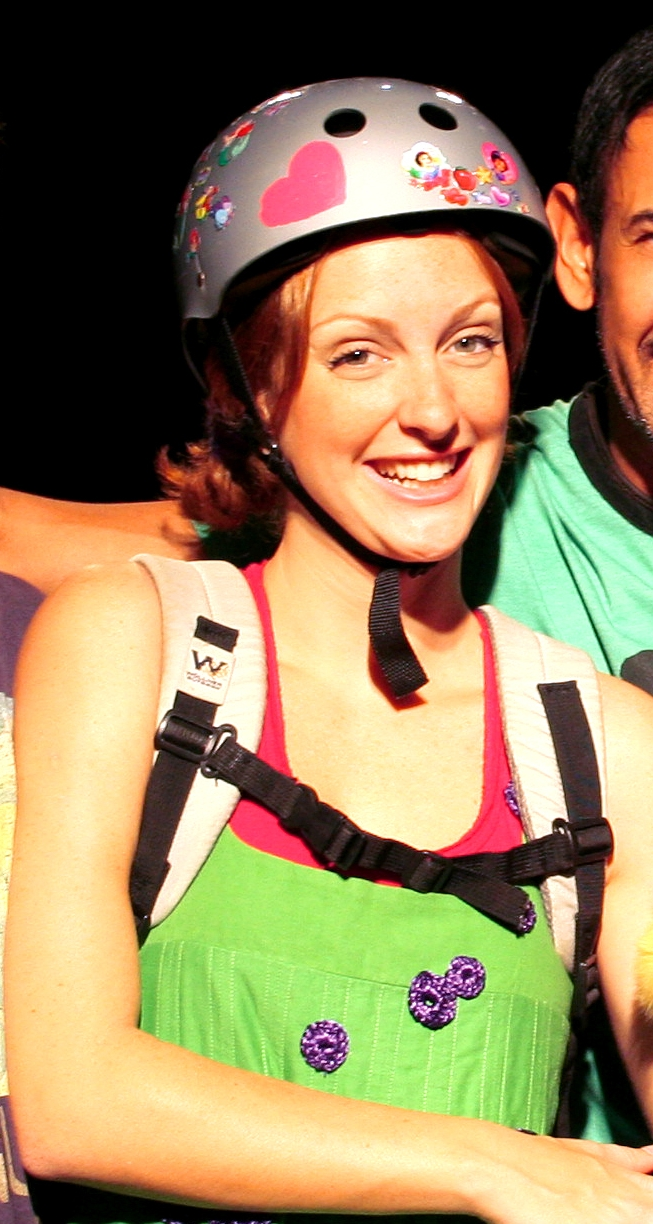
- Zaid in 2009
- Born: Laila Zajdenweber; 28 May 1984 (age 41); Rio de Janeiro, Brazil
- Occupation: Actress
- Years active: 2003–present
- Spouse: Marco Kelson (m. 2009)

Laila Zajdenweber Kelson (born 28 May 1984), known professionally as Laila Zaid, is a Brazilian actress.

== Career ==
She started to study theatre around the time she entered college, in 2003, and made her acting debut in the playA Midsummer Night's Dream. In 2004, she interpreted the waitress Bel in the telenovela Malhação for TV Globo, her first major acting role. She worked in Malhação for three years. In 2007, she was invited to star in the TV series Mandrake. In 2008, Zaid moved to RecordTV and landed a role in the novela Amor e Intrigas. Later, she worked on Bela, a Feia, interpreting the manicurist Magdalena.

In 2011, she made her film debut as Luna in Tainá 3 and later had a role in Somos tão Jovens, a biopic about Renato Russo. In 2012, after her contract with RecordTV ended, Zeid came back to TV Globo for a role in As Brasileiras and later was part of the cast for Amor Eterno Amor. In 2013 Zeid joined the cast of Além do Horizonte, her last work for Globo. In 2016, she moved to Band, and later worked on Terminadores.

== Personal life ==
She is the daughter of actress Francis Waimberg and Sami Zajdenweber. She has a degree in advertising from PUC-RJ.

Laila Zaid was born to a German Jewish family. She married economist Marco Kelson in 2009.

== Filmography ==
=== Television ===
Year	Title	Role	Notes
2004–06	Malhação	Isabel Freitas (Bel)	Seasons 11–13
2007	Mandrake	Fernanda Bertolini	
2007	Amor e Intrigas	Janaína Paiva	
2009–10	Bela, a Feia	Magdalena Fonseca	
2012	As Brasileiras	Cibele	Episode: "A Selvagem de Santarém"
2012	Amor Eterno Amor	Priscila Belize	
2013	Além do Horizonte	Priscila Leite Barcelos (Pri)	
2016	Terminadores	Diana	
2016	Insônia	Clarice	
2017	Os Trapalhões	Paulo Roberto's wife	Episode: "29 de outubro"
2018	Orgulho e Paixão	Ludmila de Albuquerque	
2018	Amigo de Aluguel	Hannah	Episode: "Bom Demais Para Ser Verdade"
2023	Todo Dia a Mesma Noite	Police officer Tereza Rocha	

=== Cinema ===
Year	Title	Role
2010	Heleno	Cigarette seller
2011	Tainá 3: The Origin	Luna
2012	E Aí... Comeu?	Girl in bar
2013	Somos tão Jovens	Ana Claudia
2014	Tim Maia	Suzi
2016	De Onde Eu Te Vejo	Fernanda
2017	Os Penetras 2 – Quem Dá Mais?	Maria Pincel
2021	Pai em Dobro	Raion
2021	Lacuna	Mizael

== Theatre ==
Year	Title	Role
2003	Sonhos de Uma Noite de Verão	Helena
2006	Romances e Karaokê	Julie
2009	O Segredo de Cocachim	Bia
2012	Rebeldes – Sobre a Raiva	—
2013	O Lugar Escuro	Neta
2015	Cachorro Quente	Samanta
2016	O Livro dos Monstros Guardados	Maria das Dores (Madá)

== Awards and nominations ==
Year	Award	Category	Recipient	Outcome	Ref
2010	Prêmio Zilka Sallaberry de Teatro Infantil	Best Actress	O Segredo de Cocachim	Nominated	
2013	Prêmio Guarani de Cinema Brasileiro	Best Supporting Actress	Somos tão Jovens	Nominated	
