= Thiago de Los Reyes =

Brazilian actor (born 1989)

- Born: Thiago de Los Reyes Peixoto; 11 November 1989 (age 35); Rio de Janeiro, Brazil
- Occupation: Actor

Thiago de Los Reyes Peixoto (11 November 1989 in Rio de Janeiro) is a Brazilian actor.

== Career ==
Television
Year	Title	Role	Notes
2000	Esplendor	Guilherme Berger (Gui)	
2001	Estrela-Guia	João Lima	
2001	Malhação	Marquinhos	Cameo
2005	Malhação	Jonas	Cameo
2005	Clara e o Chuveiro do Tempo	Túlio	
2006	Sítio do Picapau Amarelo	Prince Theo	Cameo
2007	Eterna Magia	Bruno Finnegan	
2008	Chamas da Vida	Gustavo Oliveira Santos (Guga)	
2011	Insensato Coração	Joaquim Garrido (Quim)	
2011	Malhação	Tomás Pelpatto	Cameo
2014	Além do Horizonte	Vinícius	Cameo
2014	Now Generation	Zac Vírus	
