= Juliana Martins (actress) =

Brazilian television actress and model (born 1974)

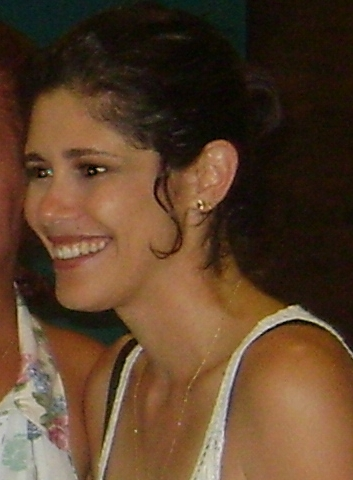
- Born: March 3, 1974 (age 51); Rio de Janeiro, Brazil
- Occupation: Actress
- Years active: 1985–present

Juliana Martins (born March 3, 1974, in Rio de Janeiro) is a Brazilian television actress and model.

== Partial Television jobs ==
- A Gata Comeu (1985)
- Churrascaria Brasil (1987) (film)
- Kananga do Japão (1989)
- Riacho Doce (1990)
- Vamp (1991)
- Malhação (1995)
- A Vida Como Ela É (1996)
- Zazá (1997)
- Vila Madalena (2000)
- Coração de Estudante (2002)
- Belíssima (2005)
- Pé na Jaca (2006)
- Caminhos do Coração (2007)
