= Olívia Torres =

Brazilian actress and singer (born 1994)

Olívia Torres Mansor
- Born: 6 June 1994 (age 30); São José do Rio Preto, São Paulo, Brazil
- Occupation: Actress
- Years active: 2004–present

Olívia Torres Mansor (born 6 June 1994) is a Brazilian actress and singer. She made her debut in television and her career at large as a child actress in Começar de Novo playing Marcinha.

== Biography ==
Trevisol started off her career at the age of 7 as a dancer. At 13 she performed in theatre. In 2015, she portrayed Débora in the 7pm telenovela Totalmente Demais.

== Filmography ==
=== Television ===
Year	Title	Role
2004	Começar de Novo	Marcinha
2005	Hoje é Dia de Maria	Eleida
2009	Malhação ID	Rita Silveira
2012	Amor Eterno Amor	Maria Gabriela Allende (Gabi)
2013	Saramandaia	Dona Candinha Rosado (Young)
2014	O Rebu	Valentina Rezende
2015	Totalmente Demais	Débora Matoso

=== Film ===
Year	Title	Role
2011	Desenrola	Priscila
2013	Somos tão Jovens	Gabriela
2014	Confissões de Adolescente	Juliana
2024	I'm Still Here	Beatriz Paiva (adult)
