= Alexandre Moreno =

French footballer (born 1977)

Personal information
- Date of birth: 3 October 1977 (age 49)
- Place of birth: Paris, France
- Height: 1.67 m (5 ft 6 in)
- Positions: Midfielder; forward

Senior career*
Years	Team	Apps	(Gls)
1997–1998	Angers	4	(0)
1998–1999	Lorient	0	(0)
1999–2000	Trélissac	5	(1)
2000–2002	Moulins	?	(?)
2002–2003	Gueugnon	10	(1)
2003–2006	Moulins	94	(13)
2006–2010	Pau	75	(10)
2010–2011	Sète	?	(?)
- * Club domestic league appearances and goals

Alexandre Moreno (born 3 October 1977) is a retired French professional footballer who played as a midfielder or a forward. During his career, he played professionally with Angers, Lorient and Gueugnon.
