= Tom Karabachian =

Brazilian actor (born 1997)

- Born: Antônio Karabachian Araújo; January 11, 1997 (age 28); Rio de Janeiro, Brazil
- Occupation: Actor
- Years active: 2013–present

Antônio Karabachian Araújo (born January 11, 1997), better known as Tom Karabachian, is a Brazilian actor.

== Biography and career ==
Karabachian was born in Rio de Janeiro, Brazil. He is the son of Brazilian singer Paulinho Moska and Nana Karabachian.

He began with a role in Louco por Elas, and later in Confissões de Adolescente. In 2016 he played a leading role in the film Fala Comigo, with Karine Teles and Denise Fraga. In 2018 he also starred as one of the leading characters of Malhação: Vidas Brasileiras.

== Filmography ==
=== Television ===
Year	Title	Role	Notes
2013	Louco por Elas	Bento	Two episodes (Credited as Antônio Karabachian)
2018-19	Malhação	Tito Laroche	Season 26
2023	Travessia	Nando	Episode: "1 de fevereiro"

=== Film ===
Year	Title	Role	Notes
2013	Confissões de Adolescente		
2016	Fala Comigo	Diogo	Main cast
2021	Homem Onça	Gustavo	

=== Theater ===
- 2019: Filhos de Medeia

== Awards and nominations ==
Year	Award	Category	Recommendation	Result	Ref.
2018	Meus Prêmios Nick 2018	Favorite TV Artist	Malhação: Vidas Brasileiras	Nominated	
