= Juliana Baroni =

Brazilian actress and singer (born 1978)

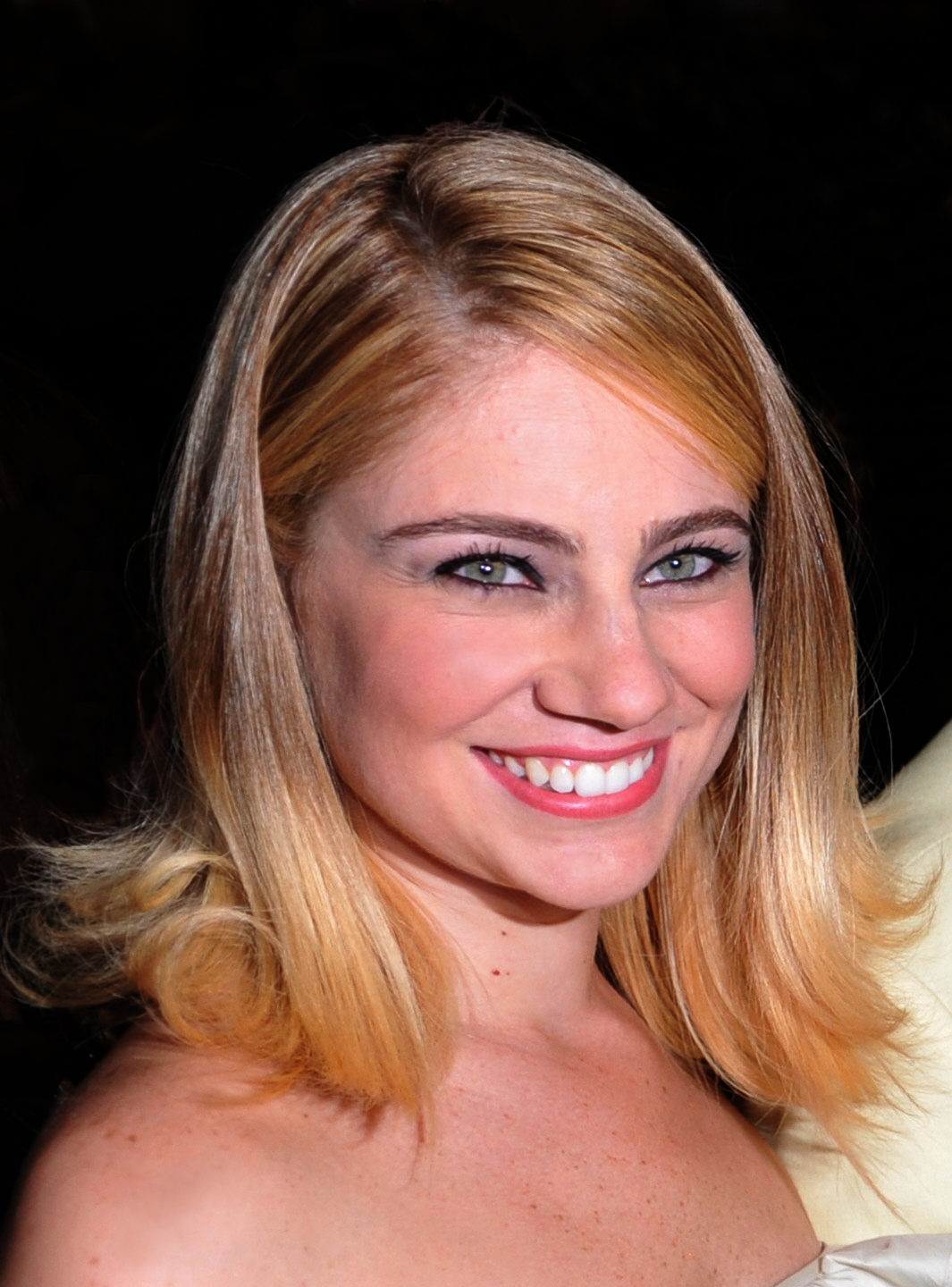
- Baroni at the 2009 Brasília Film Festival
- Born: Juliana Riva Baroni; 18 April 1978 (age 48); Limeira, São Paulo, Brazil
- Occupations: Actress; singer
- Years active: 1990–present
- Spouse: Eduardo Moreira (m. 2013)
- Children: 1

Juliana Riva Baroni (born 18 April 1978) is a Brazilian actress and singer. She is best known for being a paquita (Xuxa's stage assistant) for five years and for her leading role on the Rede Bandeirantes telenovela Dance, Dance, Dance.

== Career ==
Baroni started her television career in February 1990 as a stage assistant (paquita) to Xuxa on Rede Globo's children's television series Xou da Xuxa. She was a paquita for five years. During that time, she recorded an album with the other paquitas, besides being a backing vocal on Xuxa's records. She left the program in 1995 when Xuxa replaced all of her Paquitas with new ones.

After her departure from the show, she started her acting career, starring on the Globo telenovelas Cara & Coroa, Salsa e Merengue, Malhação, Uga-Uga, A Lua Me Disse and O Profeta. She also starred on the Portuguese telenovela A Senhora das Águas, aired on RTP.

On 2006, she remembered the time she was a paquita on a special program aired on Globo to celebrate the 20th anniversary of Xuxa's career. On the same year, she acted on the film Polaróides Urbanas, directed by Miguel Falabella. On the following year, she gained her first leading role on Rede Bandeirantes' telenovela Dance, Dance, Dance.

Juliana Baroni replaced Juliana Paes in the role of Ulla in the musical play The Producers, adapted by Falabella. The playwright compared her beauty to Scarlett Johansson's. Baroni also portrays Marisa Letícia Lula da Silva, First Lady of Brazil, in the film Lula, o filho do Brasil.

== Filmography ==
=== Film ===
Year	Title	Role	Notes
1990	Sonho de Verão		
1990	Lua de Cristal		
1991	Gaúcho Negro		
2002	Xuxa e os Duendes 2: No Caminho das Fadas	Kin	
2006	Polaróides Urbanas	Vanessa	
2008	Lula, Son of Brazil	Dona Marisa Letícia	

=== Television ===
Year	Title	Role	Notes
1990	Xou da Xuxa	Jujuba	
1995	Xuxa Park	Catuxa	
1995	Cara & Coroa	Júlia	
1996	Salsa e Merengue	Inês	
1997	Você Decide	Bárbara	
1998	Malhação	Cacau	Season 4
2001	A Senhora das Águas	Cláudia Cardoso Lobo	
2000	Uga-Uga	Sheeva Maria	
2003	Celebridade	Sônia	
2005	A Lua Me Disse	Soraya	
2006	A Grande Familia	Daniela	
2006	O Profeta	Miriam	
2007	Dance, Dance, Dance	Sofia Ivanitch	
2008	Toma Lá, Dá Cá	Louquinha Albuquerque	
2009	Cilada	Mulher Chiclete	
2010	Ribeirão do Tempo	Karina Santos	
2015	Cúmplices de um Resgate	Rebeca Agnes	

== Discography ==
=== Albums ===
- 2007: Dance, Dance, Dance soundtrack

=== Singles ===
- 2007: "Dance, Dance, Dance"
