= Zezeh Barbosa =

Brazilian actress

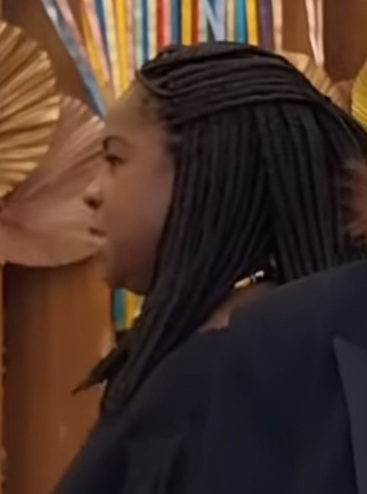
- Barbosa in 2023
- Born: March 19, 1963 (age 63); Osasco, São Paulo
- Occupation: Brazilian Actress

Maria José Barbosa e Silva (born 19 March 1963), known as Zezeh Barbosa, is a Brazilian cinema and television actress.

== Early life ==
Barbosa was born into a large family in Osasco, São Paulo, the daughter of a midwife and a blacksmith. Before starting her acting career, she worked as a secretary, telemarketing operator, and canteen attendant. Growing up with 13 siblings, she demonstrated a strong interest in the performing arts from an early age, creating theatrical scenes at home, which convinced her mother of her passion for acting.

== Career ==
She studied theater arts at the University of São Paulo, where she trained in both classical and contemporary acting techniques. Barbosa debuted as a TV actress in the soap opera Brasileiras e Brasileiros on the SBT channel in 1990 and made her film debut with the drama Paixão Perdida (1998). However, she rose to national fame by starring in the comedy Bendito Fruto (2004) which earned her the Best Actress trophy at the Brasília Festival. She became well-known to the general public for her roles in soap operas such as O Profeta (2006-2007), Negócio da China (2008-2009), and Lado a Lado (2012-2013).

Barbosa gained significant recognition for her role as Jurema, a mãe de santo, in the historical telenovela Lado a Lado, which won the International Emmy Award. Her character's portrayal highlighted important themes of religious freedom and intolerance. Barbosa's performance in the soap opera was critically acclaimed and earned her the Troféu Raça Negra de Melhor Atriz (Best Actress).

In 2015, Barbosa made a comeback to telenovelas with I Love Paraisópolis, written by Alcides Nogueira, where she played the lively microbusiness owner "Dália," who runs a clothing store called Dalíssima. That same year, she appeared in the first season of the series Os Suburbanos on Multishow.

Following that, she featured in the biographical drama Nise: O Coração da Loucura and the comedy Ninguém Ama Ninguém... Por Mais de Dois Anos, both of which contributed to her growing reputation in the industry.

By 2022, she played "Darcy Munhoz" in the telenovela Todas as Flores and explored themes of identity and self-awareness in the series Plural, which aired on Cine Brasil TV.

In 2023, she joined the cast of the telenovela Fuzuê, portraying "Glaúcia Corneteira," a character reminiscent of her previous roles in similar genres. She also acted in the children’s comedy Uma Fada Veio me Visitar, marking Xuxa Meneghel's return to cinema as she took on the role of "Fadona," the leader of the fairy group.

== Achievements ==
She has received the Candango Trophy from the Brasília Film Festival and the Troféu Raça Negra. She has also been nominated for the Grande Otelo, Guarani Award, Qualidade Brasil Award, and ACIE Award.
