= Ilya São Paulo =

Brazilian actor (1963–2023)

- Born: 13 September 1963; Feira de Santana, Bahia, Brazil
- Died: 31 January 2023 (aged 59); Rio de Janeiro, Brazil
- Spouse: Claudia Provedel
- Father: Olney São Paulo
- Relatives: Irving São Paulo (Younger brother)

Ilya Flaherty Santana São Paulo (13 September 1963 – 31 January 2023) was a Brazilian actor, mainly active in telenovelas.

== Life and career ==
Born in Feira de Santana, the son of the director Olney, São Paulo studied at the Martins Pena Drama School. He started his career as a director of documentaries and short films. After his acting debut as a child actor in 1974, in the Nelson Pereira dos Santos' film The Amulet of Ogum, São Paulo became popular in the 1990s thanks to his participation in numerous telenovelas, notably for the leading role in the 1995 remake of Irmãos Coragem.

=== Personal life and death ===
São Paulo was married to actress Patricia França from 1995 to 1997. Shortly after a long hospitalization to treat a serious shoulder injury, São Paulo was found dead at home by his second wife Claudia Provedel on 31 January 2023, at the age of 59. His brother Irving São Paulo was also an actor.
