= Os Mutantes: Caminhos do Coração =

Brazilian fantasy telenovela

- Genre: Telenovela; Sci-Fi; Fantasy
- Created by: Tiago Santiago
- Starring: Bianca Rinaldi; Leonardo Vieira; Maytê Piragibe; Babi Xavier; Felipe Folgosi; Julianne Trevisol; Gabriel Braga Nunes; Nanda Ziegler; Petrônio Gontijo; Paulo Nigro; Giselle Policarpo; Liliana Castro; Pedro Malta and big cast
- Opening theme: Planeta Sonho Milton Nascimento
- Country of origin: Brazil
- Original language: Portuguese
- No. of episodes: 242

Original release
- Network: Rede Record
- Release: 3 June 2008 – 23 March 2009

Related
- Caminhos do Coração; Promessas de Amor

Os Mutantes: Caminhos do Coração (The Mutants: Pathways of the Heart) is a Brazilian telenovela which originally aired on Rede Record.

== Plot ==
The first season of its predecessor, Caminhos do Coração, contains:

- The revelation of the mystery of Maria's kidnapping
- The discovery of the identity of the person responsible for the crimes of the bankrupt biotech company Progênese
- The transformation of Julia Zaccarias into Juli Di Trevi, her identity after receiving a rejuvenating serum
- The disclosure of Mariana, mother of twins Maria and Samira

Men and women are transformed into vampires, cats, snakes, spiders and werewolves, which attack the streets of São Paulo and disseminate evil as an epidemic. The terrified population pursues the mutants.

Maria and Marcelo meet the League of Good (composed of Noah, Cleo, Tony, Bobby, Janet, Vavá, Pachola, Perpétua, Leonor, Lúcio, Bianca, Juno, Tati, Kaspar, Ágata, Aquiles, Cris, Yara, Nathy, Valente, Simone, Newton, Marisa, Willie, Erica, Eugene, Angela and Clare) in the Mayer family mansion, which becomes the refuge and headquarters of the healthy mutants.

Samira, the twin sister of Maria (trapped in Dr. Júlia's laboratory since her birth 30 years ago), is reported dead. Samira is the most-powerful and evil mutant, since she can absorb the powers of other mutants. She is the right arm of Dr. Júlia Zaccarias, who transforms into Dr. Juli Di Trevi and aims to exterminate all who thwart her.

=== DEPECOM ===
DEPECOM (DEpartamento de PEsquisa e COntrole de Mutantes, (Department of Research and Control of Mutants) is restructured, and uses the latest technology to stop the mutants. DEPECOM is divided into two wings. One is composed of Marcelo, Miguel, Aline, Marta, Beto and Ernesto, who want to imprison the violent and preserve the peaceful. They investigate the Evil League (composed of Juli, Samira, Gór, Taveira, Eric, Metamorpho, Fernando, Ariadne, Draco and Telê), organized in São Paulo, and their commanders Juli and Gó. This wing gathers mutant gray wolves, vampires, werewolves, snakes, spiders and other dangerous creatures. The second wing is represented by Fredo and Adolfo, who want to exterminate all mutants (including the peaceful).

=== The Mystery of Valente ===
Valente discovers confidential information in the Omega File which reveals that Julia is an alien, and pays the price for his discoveries. Attacked by Fredo and his followers, he loses his memory. Valente has only one portfolio, with papers, cards and documents. He is saved by Gabriela, a doctor. While he tries to unravel the mystery of his own past, he is pursued by Fredo (who wants to kill Valente before his own past comes to light).

Nati, a vampire bitten by Taveira but who has a conscience, will help Valente to find out who he is. She is not affiliated with the Evil League, and is persecuted for exercising her free will and sharing passion with Valente. Nati's good nature overcomes her contamination, and she joins the League of Good.

=== Saving babies, saving the world ===
Janete's powers evolve. She can see into the future, and discovers that the survival of humanity depends on the survival of the children of Lúcio and Bianca. Those children must be protected, or humanity will be dominated by vicious mutants.

Bianca and Leonor are sent to Arraial Island with their babies and join the League of Good. Juli discovers Janete's premonition, and attacks the babies and their mothers (who are protected by the League of Good) with members of the Evil League.

=== Journey to the center of the Earth ===
Trying to save Lúcio and Juno's babies in the island's tunnels, Maria, Noé, Beto, Perpétua, Cléo and Toni are attacked by mutant insects, the Ant Men, Tarantula Men and giant spiders. Beto and Perpétua escape, but the others are captured by the Carpenter Ant Men and brought to Agartha. The Ant Queen tells them they are in Shangri-La, the Agarthan capital at the center of the Earth.

Juno and Lúcio return to Melquior, the prince of Agartha, who leads the League of Good in the fight against the reptilian aliens and the Evil League. If they join the reptilian army and the Evil League, humanity will perish but; if the babies join the League of Good, humanity will prevail and the reptilians will be defeated.

=== Vampire League ===
The mutant vampire Dracula and his lieutenant, Bram, find the former headquarters of the League of Evil and take it over. They recruit vampires to form the Vampire League, a branch of the League of Evil which hosts blood-drinking parties. Nati, a vampire, ends their thirst for destruction.

== Cast ==
=== Main ===
- Bianca Rinaldi - Maria dos Santos Luz Mayer Duarte Montenegro and Samira Mayer
- Leonardo Vieira - Marcelo Duarte Montenegro
- Babi Xavier - Juli di Trevi
- Petrônio Gontijo - Fredo Cavalcanti
- Marcos Pitombo - Valente (Caminhos do Coração) José da Silva Valente (Valente)
- Maytê Piragibe - Natália(Caminhos do Coração) Natália Palmieri (Nati)
- Liliana Castro - Janete Fontes Martinelli (Jan)
- Gabriel Braga Nunes - Sigismundo Taveira (Taveira)
- Tuca Andrada - Eric Fusili (Lobão)
- Julianne Trevisol - Górgona(Gor)
- Carolina Holanda - Dra. Gabriela
- Maurício Ribeiro - Cristiano Pena (Cris)
- Felipe Folgosi -Roberto Duarte Montenegro (Beto/Enigma)
- Paulo Nigro - Antônio Mayer (Toni)
- Giselle Policarpo - Cléo Mayer
- Rafaela Mandelli - Regina Mayer
- Cláudio Heinrich - Danilo Mayer (Danilinho / Dan)
- André de Biase - Aristóteles Mayer (Ari)
- Angelina Muniz - Cassandra Fontes Martinelli
- Sacha Bali - Matheus Morpheus Mayer(Metamorfo)
- Lígia Fagundes - Leonor Batista
- Nanda Ziegler - Bianca Fischer
- Milena Ferrari - Aline Reis
- Jonathan Haagensen - Miguel Ângelo
- André Segatti - Ernesto Justo
- Rômulo Estrela - Draco
- Rômulo Arantes Neto - Telê
- Élcio Monteze - Príncipe Melquior
- Fernando Pavão -Noel Machado (Noé)
- Patrícia de Jesus - Perpétua Salvador
- Louise D'Tuani - Rainha Isis de Almeida Solar Donato
- Théo Becker - Fernando(Homem Cobra)
- Zé Dumont - Teófilo Magalhães (Mar / Guerreiro da Luz)
- Flávia Monteiro -Viviane Menezes (Vivi)
- Taumaturgo Ferreira -Tarcísio Batista (Batista)
- Cláudia Alencar - Sandra Gisa de Albuquerque Andrade
- Raul Gazola - João Ricardo Borba Gato de Albuquerque Andrade
- Pedro Nercessian - Tarso de Albuquerque Andrade
- Thiago Gagliasso - Gaspar
- Paloma Bernardi - Luna Reis
- Carla Regina - Ant Queen
- Suyane Moreira - Iara
- Karen Junqueira - Furia
- Mário Frias - Lino Rodrigues (Dracula)
- André Mattos -Paulo Pachola (Pachola)
- Andréa Avancini - Érica Menezes Figueira
- Helena Xavier - Simone dos Santos (mulher Dona pouco)
- Rocco Pitanga - Armando Carvalho (Carvalho)
- Antônio Pitanga -Newton Carvalho (Nil)
- Marina Miranda - Marisa Gama
- Arthur Lopes - Luciano Men (Iluminado)
- Diego Christo - Hélio Bezerra
- Lívia Rossy - Ceres
- Diogo Oliveira - Carpenterant
- Carolina Magalhães - Carol Verdi
- Joaquim de Castro - Adolfo
- Marcelo Reis - Bram
- André Santinho - Tarantula Men
- Paulo Reis - Kidor
- Jorge Pontual - Felipe
- Felipe Adler - Nightmare (Pesadelo)
- Jean Beppe - Typhon (Homem-Tufão)

=== Youth ===
- Letícia Medina - Tatiana Duarte Montenegro (Tati)
- Sérgio Malheiros - Aquiles Magalhães
- Juliana Xavier - Ágata Magalhães
- Pedro Malta - Eugênio Menezes Figueira (Genius Small)
- Shaila Arsene - Clara Menezes Figueira (Clarinha / Iluminação)
- Júlia Maggessi - Ângela Menezes Figueira (Small Angel)
- Cássio Ramos - Valfredo Pachola (Vavá / Wolfboy)
- Sofia Rezende - Juno
- Cézar Augusto Neto - Lúcio

=== Guest appearances ===
- Miriam Freeland - Marta Pureza
- Daniel Aguiar - Vladmir Pereira (Vlado)
- Lana Rodes - Esmeralda Nascimento Justo
- Eduardo Lago - Luís Guilherme Batista Figueira (Guiga)
- Myriam Pérsia - Mariana Mayer
- Natália Guimarães - Ariadne
- Fernanda Nobre -Lúcia Rocha Mayer (Lucinha)
- Fafá de Belém - Ana Gabriela dos Santos Luz (Ana Luz)
- Perfeito Fortuna - Pepe Luz
- Ítala Nandi - Júlia Zaccarias
- Jean Fercondini - Lucas Fontes Martinelli
- Helder Agostini - Demétrio
- Andréa Leal - Rosa Encarnada
- Patricya Travassos - Irma Mayer
- Ângelo Paes Leme - Rodrigo Mayer
- Mônica Carvalho - Amália Fortunato Mayer
- Sebastião Vasconcellos - Mauro Fontes
- Preta Gil - Helga Silva da Silveira
- Cássio Scapin - Dr. César Rubicão (hologram)
- Daniel Andrade - José
- Java Mayam - Joca
- Allan Souza Lima - Meduso Mayer
- Fausto Maule - Lupo
- Marcos Suhre -Homem de Gelo
- José Loreto - Scorpio
- Jonathan Nogueira - Paglia Souza
- Nill Marcondes - Breno
- Françoise Forton- Cristna Dorange, Juiza Estela Dorange
- Rogério Fabiano - Ezequiel Gottardo
- Sebastião Lemos - José (outlaw, vagabond)
- Bernardo Castro Alves - Rico
- Alexandre Machafer - Tsepes
- Gabriel Azevedo - Stoker
- Cláudio Andrade - Heraldo
- Danilo Sacramento - Quim
- Lorenzo Martin - DEPECOM officer
- Ulisses Silveira - Nosferatu

== Soundtrack ==
- Musical producer: Daniel Figueiredo
- Musical director: Marcio Antonucci
1. "Planeta Sonho" - 14 Bis (opening theme 1)
2. "Planeta Sonho" - Milton Nascimento (opening theme 2)
3. "Maria, Maria" - Roupa nova (Maria's theme)
4. "Grande Amor" - Fafá de Belém (Maria and Marcelo's theme)
5. "Raça" - Fafá de Belém and Milton Nascimento (Esmeralda and Ernesto's theme)
6. "Mutantes Depois" - Os Mutantes (Tarso theme)
7. "Canto de la terra" - Sarah Brightman and Andrea Bocelli (Nati and Valente's theme)
8. "Quem Sabe Um Dia a Gente Se Vê" - Donna Lolla (Fredo and Marta's theme)
9. "Rosa Dos Ventos" - Chico Buarque (League of Good theme)
10. "Sonho de Ícaro" - Ricky Vallen (children's theme)
11. "Bilhete" - Ivan Lins (Vivi's theme)
12. "Reencontro" - Rosana Fiengo and Rodrigo Faro (Kaspar and Luna's theme)
13. "João e Maria" - Chico Buarque and Branca Lima (Eugênio and Ágata's theme)
14. "Show That Girl" - Yasmin Gontijo and Feio (Gor and Metamorpho's theme)
15. "Tu Quieres Mi Churros" - Os Virgens (Dr. Gabriela's theme)
16. "Robocop Gay" - Mamonas Assassinas (Danilo's theme)
17. "Sexo" - Oswaldo Montenegro (Fernando and Ariadne's theme)
18. "The Game of Life" - Scorpions (League of Evil theme)

== See also ==
- List of vampire television series
