= Kadu Moliterno =

Brazilian actor (born 1952)

- Born: Carlos Eduardo Moliterno; 20 June 1952 (age 73); São Paulo, São Paulo, Brazil
- Occupation: Actor
- Website: www.kadumoliterno.com.br

Carlos Eduardo Moliterno, best known as Kadu Moliterno (São Paulo, 20 June, 1952), is a Brazilian actor. He became well-known when he starred in the soap opera O Príncipe e o Mendigo in 1972 on RecordTV, and had his breakout role in the 1980 decade in the Rede Globo series Armação Ilimitada as "Juba", who lived a love triangle together with his associate "Lula" (André de Biase) and the journalist "Zelda Scott" (Andréa Beltrão).

== Filmography ==
=== Television ===
Year	Title	Role	Notes
1970	As Pupilas do Senhor Reitor	Pedro das Dornas (jovem)	Episodes: "23–26 de março"
1970	Tilim	Raul Aguiar	
1971	Quarenta Anos Depois	Flávio Pacheco de Oliva	
1972	O Príncipe e o Mendigo	Eduardo VI de Inglaterra	
1972	O Príncipe e o Mendigo	Tom Canty	
1972	Selva de Pedra	Oswaldo Paiva Netto	
1976	A Viagem	Caíto	Episodes: "20 de fevereiro–27 de março"
1976	O Julgamento	André Mello	
1977	Um Sol Maior	Alberto	
1978	O Pulo do Gato	Billy	
1978	A Sucessora	Vasco Stein	
1979	Cabocla	Manoel Junqueira Caldas (Neco)	
1980	Água Viva	Bruno Fraga Simpson	
1980	As Três Marias	Lucas	
1981	Brilhante	Afonso Negreiros	
1982	Paraíso	José Eleutério Ferrabraz (Zeca / Filho do Diabo)	
1983	Eu Prometo	Conrado de Oliveira Sobral	
1984	Partido Alto	Werner	
1985–88	Armação Ilimitada	Juba	
1989	Juba &amp; Lula	Juba	
1990	Fronteiras do Desconhecido	Orlando	Episódio: "A Matéria dos Sonhos"
1991	O Dono do Mundo	Rodolfo Steiner	
1992	Anos Rebeldes	Inácio Avelar	
1992	Você Decide	Daniel	Episódio: "Antes Que o Amor Acabe"
1993	Você Decide	Gomes	Episódio: "Laços de Afeto"
1993	Você Decide	Fernando	Episódio: "A Chantagem"
1993	Renascer	Rafael Menezes	Episódios: "11–13 de março"
1993	Sex Appeal	Renato Lührman	
1994	Memorial de Maria Moura	Padre José Maria de Jesus	
1994	Pátria Minha	Gustavo Pellegrini	Episódios: "18–21 de julho"
1994	Quatro por Quatro	Samuel Spadafora (Samuca Espada)	
1996	Vira Lata	Detetive Romeu Buonaventura	
1996	Você Decide	Eduardo	Episódio: "Remédio Duvidoso"
1996	Você Decide	Pedro	Episódio: "Bala Perdida"
1997	Você Decide	Rondinelli	Episódio: "Norma"
1997	Você Decide	Guilherme	Episódio: "O Desfalque"
1997	Malhação	Paulo Camargo Faria	Episódios: "18–22 de maio"
1997	Anjo Mau	Rodrigo Arantes Medeiros	
1998	Você Decide	Doni	Episódio: "Sexo Falado é Sexo?"
1998	A Turma do Didi	Rei	Episódio: "25 de outubro"
1999	Suave Veneno	Álvaro Figueira	
2000	Brava Gente	Passos	Episódio: "Entre o Céu e a Terra"
2001	Porto dos Milagres	Dr. Rodrigo Feitosa	
2002	Desejos de Mulher	Heitor	Episódio: "21 de janeiro"
2002	Malhação	César Rodrigues	Temporada 9
2003	Celebridade	Dr. Daniel Freire	Episódios: "11 de maio–25 de junho"
2003	Kubanacan	Dr. Moralez	Episódios: "21–28 de agosto"
2004	Da Cor do Pecado	Carlos Noronha	Episódio: "9 de julho"
2004	Como uma Onda	Antônio Amarante (Amarante)	
2005	Bang Bang	Jesse James / Denaide Johnson	
2007	Amazônia	Paulo Souza Borges	
2008	Beleza Pura	Gaspar Monteiro Saldanha	
2008	Faça Sua História	Felipe	Episódio: "A Guerra de Tróia"
2009	Paraíso	Raul Bertoni (Bertoni)	
2009	Geral.com	Caco	Episódio: "Ger@l.show" Episódio: "Tribos"
2010	Na Forma da Lei	Thales Fonseca	Episódio: "Amores Mortais"
2011	Malhação	Nelson Tavares	Temporada 19
2012	Dança dos Famosos	Participante (4° lugar)	Temporada 9
2014	As Canalhas	Paulo Roberto	Episódio: "Cleo"
2015	Alto Astral	Pedro Romantini	Episódios: "11 de fevereiro–3 de abril"
2015	Vai que Cola	Juca	Episódio: "Ajolescente"
2016	A Terra Prometida	Acã Kalil	
2017	Belaventura	Rei Otoniel Montebelo e Luxemburgo II	
2019	Topíssima	Dagoberto da Costa	
2025	Power Couple Brasil	Participante (6º lugar)	Temporada 7

=== Cinema ===
Ano	Título	Personagem
1973	A Noite das Fêmeas	Carlos Eduardo Pontes da Silva
1976	A Árvore dos Sexos	Carlos Eduardo Novello
1977	A Virgem	Valdo Camargo Leitão (Vado)
2004	Tainá 2 - A Aventura Continua	Gaspar Lopes
