= Os Dez Mandamentos =

- Promotional poster used to promote the premiere of the telenovela.
- Genre: Epic; Romance
- Created by: Vivian de Oliveira
- Directed by: Alexandre Avancini
- Starring: Guilherme Winter; Giselle Itié; Sergio Marone; Camila Rodrigues; Vera Zimmerman; Denise del Vecchio; Larissa Maciel; Petronio Gontijo
- Country of origin: Brazil
- Original language: Portuguese
- No. of seasons: 2
- No. of episodes: 242

Production
- Production locations: Rio de Janeiro, Brazil
- Camera setup: Multi-camera
- Running time: 40-70 minutes

Original release
- Network: RecordTV
- Release: March 23, 2015 – July 4, 2016

Os Dez Mandamentos (English: The Ten Commandments; also distributed in Spanish as Moisés y los Diez Mandamientos, "Moses and the Ten Commandments") is a Brazilian primetime biblical telenovela produced and broadcast by RecordTV. It premiered on Monday, March 23, 2015, replacing Vitória at 8:30 p.m. (BRT/AMT).

Os Dez Mandamentos is written by Vivian de Oliveira and directed by Alexandre Avancini, the novel features the performances of Brazilian actors, Guilherme Winter, Denise Del Vecchio, Giselle Itié, Sérgio Marone, Camila Rodrigues and Sidney Sampaio in the main roles.

According to Ibope (Brazilian Institute of Public Opinion and Statistics), in the week of September 28–October 4, 2015, it was the fifth most watched program of the Brazilian television (being the second most-watched scripted show), with an average of 6,210,809 viewers per minute, taking into account a projection of 15 metropolitan areas.

A film adaptation, The Ten Commandments: The Movie, was released in 2016.

The plot received three nominations at the Seoul International Drama Awards of 2016 in the categories of best novela, best director and best writer.

The plot was also nominated for the Shorty Awards, the world's largest social network award in the "Television" category.

== Production and scenography ==
Os Dez Mandamentos is the first telenovela based on a biblical story, both in Brazilian and world television. The expected initial production is 150 chapters, with external recordings in the Atacama Desert in Chile, as well as recordings in Guarapuava, Paraná. Some of the special effects is produced by a studio in Hollywood. Considered the most expensive production in the history of the station, has an estimated cost of R$ 700,000 per chapter. Twenty-eight scenarios and a scenographic city with more than seven thousand square meters were built, where the cities of the Hebrews and Egyptians are reproduced. For recording, Arri Alexa's digital cameras were used.

== Cast ==
Actor / Actress	Character
Guilherme Winter	Moses (3rd phase)
Camila Rodrigues	Nefertari (2nd phase)
Sérgio Marone	Ramses (3rd phase)
Victório Ghava	Aaron (1st phase)
Kadu Schons	Aaron (2nd phase)
Petrônio Gontijo	Aaron (3rd phase)
Bianka Fernandes	Abigail
Kaik Brum	Abihu (2nd phase)
Daniel Siwek	Abihu (3rd phase)
Sandro Rocha	Abiram
Arthur Moraes	Abner
Camila Santanioni	Ada
Rayana Carvalho	Adira
Fábio Beltrão	Aholiab
Carlos Bonow	Ahmós
Carolina Bezerra	Aija (2nd Season)
Marina Moschen	Amalia (1st phase)
Lisandra Souto	Amalia (2nd phase)
José Victor Pires	Amenhotep
Roger Gobeth	Amram (1st phase)
Paulo Gorgulho	Amram (2nd phase)
Tammy Di Calafiori	Ana
Thierry Figueira	Anibal
Bárbara Quercetti	Anippe
Heitor Martinez	Apuki
Leonardo Braga	Assir
Mateus Lustosa	Bak
Kiko Pissolato	Bakenmut
Leonardo Vieira	Balaam (2nd Season)
Daniel Alvim	Balak (2nd Season)
Benvindo Siqueira	Baruk
Iran Malfitano	Bennu
Marcela Barrozo	Betania
Luiz Felipe Mello	Bezalel (2nd phase)
Igor Cosso	Bezalel (3rd phase)
Kátia Moraes	Bina
Milhem Cortaz	Bomani
Rodrigo Vidigal	Caleb
Julio Oliveira	Chibale
Talita Younan	Damarina
Bruno Padilha	Dathan
Pérola Faria	Deborah
Daniel Aguiar	Disebek (1st phase)
Eduardo Lago	Disebek (2nd phase)
Nina de Pádua	Dorcas (2nd Season)
Bia Braga	Dumah (2nd Season)
João Pedro Franco	Elcana
Francisca Queiroz	Elda (2nd Season)
Paulo Reis	Eldade
Rafael Sun	Eleazar (2nd phase)
Bernardo Velasco	Eleazar (3rd phase)
Gustavo Henzel	Eliezer
Gabriela Durlo	Elisheba
Brenda Sabryna	Emma (2nd Season)
Fernando Sampaio	Gahiji
Luiz Eduardo Oliveira	Gershon
Mel Lisboa	Henutmire (1st phase)
Vera Zimmermann	Henutmire (2nd phase)
Kauã Torres	Hori
Sidney Sampaio	Hoshe'a / Joshua
Floriano Peixoto	Hur
Victor Pecoraro	Ikeni
Brendha Haddad	Inês
Henrique Gottardo	Ithamar
Keff Oliveira	Jair (2nd Season)
Erich Pelitz	Jairo
Rocco Pitanga	Jahi
Adriano Petermann	Janes
William Vita	Jambres
Rafaela Sampaio	Jaque (2nd phase)
Fran Maya	Jaque (3rd phase)
Thais Muller	Jerusa
Paulo Figueiredo	Jethro
Rayanne Morais	Joana (2nd Season)
Samara Felippo	Jochebed (1st phase)
Denise Del Vecchio	Jochebed (2nd phase)
Nanda Ziegler	Judite
Anita Amizo	Karen
Roberta Santiago	Karoma
Bruno Ahmed	Kenaz (2nd Season)
Vitor Hugo	Korah
Juliana Didone	Leila
Ricardo Vandré	Lemuel (2nd Season)
Talita Castro	Libna (2nd Season)
Bárbara França	Maya
Nikki Meneghel	Meryt
Luciano Szafir	Meketre
Jorge Pontual	Menahem
Isabella Koppel	Miriam (1st phase)
Ariela Massotti	Miriam (2nd phase)
Larissa Maciel	Miriam (3rd phase)
Pedro Pupak	Moses (1st phase)
Enzo Simi	Moses (2nd phase)
Higor Castro	Nadab (2nd phase)
Marco Antônio Gimenez	Nadab (3rd phase)
Paulo Vilela	Natan (2nd Season)
Maria Ceiça	Nayla
Giovanna Maluf	Nefertari (1st phase)
Jessika Alves	Noemí (2nd Season)
Vicente Tuchinsky	Num (1st phase)
Licurgo Spinola	Num (2nd phase)
Alexandre Barros	Oren (2nd Season)
Paulo Nigro	Paser (1st phase)
Giuseppe Oristanio	Paser (2nd phase)
Ittalo Paixão	Pepy
Pietro Buonnafina	Phinehas
Gustavo Flores	Phinehas (2nd Season)
Valéria Alencar	Puah
Aisha Jambo	Radina
Carlos Augusto Sales	Ramses (1st phase)
Edu Pinheiro	Ramses (2nd phase)
Nicole Orsini	Raya
Roney Villela	Rishon (2nd Season)
Ricardo Pavão	Seon (2nd Season)
Monalisa Eleno	Siloé (2nd Season)
Jeniffer Setti	Safira
Zécarlos Machado	Seti I
Raissa Peniche	Seti's second wife
Stella Freitas	Shiphrah
Renato Liveira	Simut
Babi Xavier	Tais
Danilo Mesquita	Tales (2nd Season)
Rayener Erlich	Talita (2nd Season)
Carolina Chalita	Tanya (2nd Season)
Fernanda Nizzato	Teti
Angelina Muniz	Tuya
Rafael Sardão	Uri
Anna Rita Cerqueira	Yarin (2nd Season)
Day Mesquita	Yunet (1st phase)
Adriana Garambone	Yunet (2nd phase)
Felipe Cardoso	Zelophehad
Giselle Itié	Zipporah
Dudu Azevedo	Zur (2nd Season)

== Rating ==
=== Brazil ===
Season	Timeslot	Episodes	Premiere		Finale		Rank	Rating average
Season	Timeslot	Episodes	Date	Viewers (in points)	Date	Viewers (in points)	Rank	Rating average
1# 2015–16	Mondays–Fridays; 8:30pm	150	March 23, 2015	12	November 23, 2015	24		16.2
2# 2016	Mondays–Fridays; 8:30pm	66	April 4, 2016	16	July 4, 2016	19		15.5

In its debut, Os Dez Mandamentos has acquired an Ibope rating of 12.1 points in the final numbers, representing the best debut of a Rede Record telenovela since Ribeirão do Tempo, in 2010. At the same time, Jornal Nacional (Globo, 25.3 points) and Carrossel (SBT, 11.8 points) performed well.

=== United States ===
Season	Timeslot (ET)	Episodes	First aired		Last aired	
Season	Timeslot (ET)	Episodes	Date	Viewers (millions)	Date	Viewers (millions)
1	Mon–Fri 8pm/7c	176	July 11, 2016	0.42	April 7, 2017	1.40
2	Mon–Fri 8pm/7c	68	April 9, 2017	1.06	June 12, 2017	1.38
