= Paloma Bernardi =

Brazilian actress

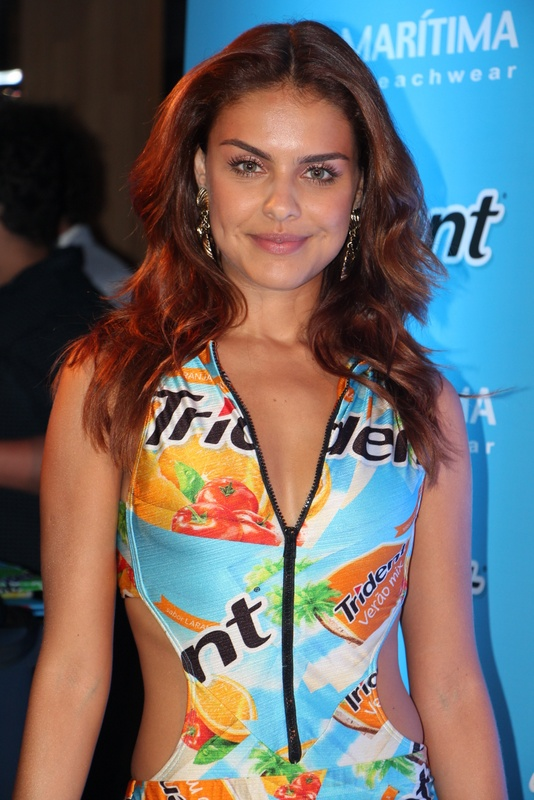
- Bernardi in 2015
- Born: Paloma Bernardi; April 21, 1985 (age 40); São Paulo, Brazil
- Occupation: Actress
- Years active: 1996–present

Paloma Bernardi (born April 21, 1985) is a Brazilian actress. She became known in Brazil playing the character Mia in the telenovela Viver a Vida.

== Biography ==
Bernardi was born in São Paulo, Brazil. She is the daughter of businessman Nestor Bernardi and the plastic artist and former dancer Dil Bernardi. In 2005 she graduated from Senac in the Technical Course of Actor presenting the play Faces D'Alma. In 2006 Paloma graduated in the College of Radio and TV of the Methodist University of São Paulo.

== Filmography ==
=== Television ===
Year	Title	Role	Ref.
1996	Colégio Brasil	Antônia	
2007–2008	Caminhos do Coração	Luna Reis	
2008–2009	Os Mutantes - Caminhos do Coração	Luna Reis	
2009–2010	Viver a Vida	Mia Saldanha Ribeiro	
2011	Insensato Coração	Alice Miranda	
2012–2013	Salve Jorge	Rosângela Florentina	
2016–2017	A Terra Prometida	Samara	
2017-2018	Apocalipse	Isabela Aisen Gudman	
2019	The Chosen One	Lúcia Santeiro	

=== Film ===
Year	Title	Role	Ref.
2011	Caso Fechado	Lena	
2013	Lascados	Cenilde	

=== Videoclip ===
Year	Group/Singer	Music
2013	Thiago André Barbosa	"Desencana"
2011	João Bosco & Vinícius	"Tarde Demais"
2011	Brenno Be	"Um Outro Dia"
2010	Banda Azúkar	"Latinos (la hora ya llego)"
2008	Banda Money Honey	"Willesden Green Box"

== Theater ==
Title	Role
O Grande Amor da Minha Vida	Maria Helena
Dom Quixote	Aldonza
A Flor do Lixo	
Fases d' Alma	
Despertar na Floresta	Agualina
Galileu Galilei	
A Bruxinha que Era Boa	
Dom Bosco	
Romeu e Julieta	
Woyzek	
Pequena Sereia II	
Fases d' Alma	
Aladdin	
Hércules	
A Polegarzinha	
A Vida É Sonho	
O Novo	

== Awards and nominations ==
Year	Award	Category	Work	Results
2010	Super Cap de Ouro	Revelation	Viver a Vida	Won
