= A Terra Prometida =

- Genre: Telenovela; Biblical epic
- Created by: Renato Modesto
- Directed by: Alexandre Avancini
- Starring: Sidney Sampaio; Thaís Melchior; Milhem Cortaz; Kadu Moliterno; Miriam Freeland; Paloma Bernardi; Maytê Piragibe; Beth Goulart; Nívea Stelmann; Alexandre Slaviero
- Theme music composer: Daniel Figueiredo
- Opening theme: "Veludo Aca Mil" - Rannieri Oliveira
- Country of origin: Brazil
- Original language: Portuguese
- No. of episodes: 179

Production
- Production company: Casablanca

Original release
- Network: RecordTV
- Release: July 5, 2016 – March 13, 2017

A Terra Prometida (English: The Promised Land) is a Brazilian telenovela produced by Casablanca and broadcast by RecordTV. It premiered on July 5, 2016 and ended on March 13, 2017. It tells the story of the biblical character Joshua.

== Synopsis ==
The series takes place in approximately 1200 B.C in a Hebrew camp in Shittim, in the desert of Moab. After the death of Moses, Joshua becomes the new leader of the Hebrews. Joshua is an experienced warrior, endowed with courage, determination, and a powerful faith. But it is no easy task to lead a people to their destination. With his closest and trusted allies, (the Levite priest Eleazar and Caleb, who is the leader of the tribe of Judah) Joshua has to fulfill a difficult mission, one ordained by God: to command the twelve tribes of Israel and lead them in their conquest of Canaan, the Promised Land.

== Cast ==
Actor	Character
Sidney Sampaio	Joshua
Thaís Melchior	Aruna
Paloma Bernardi	Samara
Milhem Cortaz	Caleb
Rafael Sardão	Salmom
Paulo César Grande	Haniel
Igor Pickli	Marek
Juliana Silveira	Kalési
Nívea Stelmann	Noemi
Cristiana Oliveira	Mara
Maytê Piragibe	Jéssica
Cláudio Gabriel	Elói
Raphael Viana	Tobias
Beth Goulart	Leia
Brendha Haddad	Inês
Marisol Ribeiro	Achsah
Raymundo de Souza	Quemuel
Luciana Braga	Yana
Ricky Tavares	Zaqueu
Elizângela	Milah
Walter Breda	Orias
Bernardo Velasco	Eleazar
Guilherme Boury	Iru
Leonardo Miggiorin	Othniel
Kadu Moliterno	Acã
Gabriel Gracindo	Melquias
Rodrigo Phavanello	Gibar
Ernani Moraes	Pedael
Guilherme Leme	Elidade
Valéria Alencar	Laila
Letícia Medina	Livana
Day Mesquita	Ioná
Alexandre Slaviero	Maquir
Fábio Villa Verde	Aiúde
Juliana Boller	Chaia
Andréa Avancini	Sama
Gilberto Torres	Mibar
Daniel Erthal	Isaque
Alexandre Tigano	Muralha
Paulo Goulart Filho	Talmal
Douglas Sampaio	Rune
Ariela Massotti	Laís
André Ramiro	Jesana
Tatsu Carvalho	Boã
Ana Barroso	Darda
João Bourbonnais	Elias
Rafael Queiroz	Phinehas
Louise Marrie	Ruth
Juliana Kelling	Neziá
Altair Rodrigues	Eliazafe
Guggo Morales	Samuel
Iran Gomes	Zuma
Caetano O'Maihlan	Setur
Lino Correa	Paltiel
Ray Erlich	Adélia
Armando Amaral	Elizafã
Dudu Oliveira	Jogli
Edu Porto	Abel
Zeca Carvalho	Kenaz
Osmar Silveira	Temá
Lucas Montandon	Baltazar
Karen Mota	Mandisa
Antônio Carlos	Bomani
Regiane Cesnique	Elisa
Cristiane Machado	Deborah
Malu Stanchi	Lila
Mário Meireles	Gael

== Broadcast ==
The telenovela aired from July 5, 2016 to March 13, 2017 at 8:30 p.m. (BRT/AMT).

In the United States it aired on Univision from August 7, 2017 to September 8, 2017 and on September 11, 2017 it moved to sister channel UniMás due to low ratings.

=== Ratings ===
==== Brazil ====
Season	Timeslot (BRT/AMT)	Episodes	First aired		Last aired	
Season	Timeslot (BRT/AMT)	Episodes	Date	Viewers (in points)	Date	Viewers (in points)
1	Mon–Fri 8:30pm	179	July 5, 2016	17.7	March 13, 2017	15.5
