= MasterChef Celebridades =

- Genre: Cooking
- Based on: Celebrity MasterChef
- Judges: Érick Jacquin; Helena Rizzo; Henrique Fogaça
- Narrated by: Bruna Thedy
- Country of origin: Brazil
- Original language: Portuguese
- No. of seasons: 1
- No. of episodes: 10

Production
- Producer: Endemol Shine Brasil
- Running time: 120 minutes

Original release
- Network: Band
- Release: November 18, 2025 – present

Related
- MasterChef; MasterChef Junior; MasterChef Profissionais; MasterChef: A Revanche; MasterChef + MasterChef Confeitaria; MasterChef Creators

MasterChef Celebridades is a Brazilian cooking competition television series based on the format of the U.K. series Celebrity MasterChef. The series premiered on November 18, 2025, on Band.

Actress Julianne Trevisol won the competition over singer Valesca Popozuda on January 20, 2026.

== Format ==
MasterChef Celebridades is a spin-off from the main MasterChef Brasil series, featuring celebrities, composed of actors, singers, professional athletes and social media personalities. This is the tenth country in the world to produce a version of MasterChef exclusively focused on celebrities, after Australia, Colombia, Spain, India, Ireland, Mexico, Portugal, the United Kingdom, and Romania. In addition, in Brazil, the reality show has already featured celebrities as contestants in 2020 and 2021 during a special year-end edition.

The winner receives a R$350.000 cash prize, a scholarship on Le Cordon Bleu, R$50.000 courtesy by iFood plus a specialized consultancy for the winner's future restaurant, a shop card on Havan worth R$30.000, R$100.000 courtesy by Asaas plus a business support and the MasterChef Celebridades trophy.

A scholarship on Le Cordon Bleu in pâtisserie with some of the leading names in confectionery was awarded to the runner-up.

== Contestants ==
=== Top 12 ===
Contestant	Age	Hometown	Occupation	Result	Winnings	Finish
Julianne Trevisol	42	Rio de Janeiro	Actress	Winner on January 20	6	1st
Valesca Popozuda	47	Rio de Janeiro	Singer	Runner-up on January 20	3	2nd
Dodô Pixote	39	São Paulo	Singer	Eliminated on January 13	3	3rd/4th
Maurren Maggi	49	São Carlos	Former athlete	Eliminated on January 13	4	3rd/4th
Gilmelândia	53	Salvador	Singer	Eliminated on January 6	5	5th
Rachel Sheherazade	52	João Pessoa	Journalist	Eliminated on December 30	4	6th
Tiago Piquilo	41	Fartura	Singer	Eliminated on December 23	2	7th
John Drops	33	Salvador	Digital Influencer	Eliminated on December 16	0	8th
Luciano Szafir	56	São Paulo	Actor	Eliminated on December 9	2	9th
Márcia Goldschmidt	65	São Paulo	TV Host	Eliminated on December 2	0	10th
Leonardo Miggiorin	43	Barbacena	Actor	Eliminated on November 25	1	11th
Hugo Alves	43	Goiânia	Singer	Eliminated on November 18	0	12th

== Elimination table ==
Place	Contestant	Episode																
Place	Contestant	1		2		3	4		5		6		7	8		9		10
1	Julianne	IN	HIGH	HIGH	IMM	WIN	LOW	WIN	IN	IN	IN	WIN	LOW	HIGH	WIN	WIN	IMM	WINNER
2	Valesca	LOW	LOW	HIGH	IMM	HIGH	LOW	IN	IN	LOW	WIN	IMM	WIN	IN	LOW	HIGH	WIN	RUNNER-UP
3–4	Dodô	WIN	IMM	LOW	LOW	WIN	LOW	IN	IN	LOW	IN	LOW	WIN	IN	HIGH	IN	ELIM	
3–4	Maurren	IN	IMM	WIN	IMM	LOW	LOW	LOW	IN	WIN	HIGH	IMM	WIN	WIN	IMM	IN	ELIM	
5	Gilmelândia	LOW	IN	IN	WIN	WIN	WIN	IMM	WIN	IMM	HIGH	IMM	WIN	IN	ELIM			
6	Rachel	HIGH	IMM	WIN	IMM	WIN	WIN	IMM	WIN	IMM	IN	LOW	ELIM					
7	Tiago	HIGH	IMM	IN	LOW	WIN	WIN	IMM	IN	HIGH	IN	ELIM						
8	John	IN	IMM	IN	HIGH	HIGH	LOW	IN	IN	ELIM								
9	Luciano	LOW	WIN	IN	IN	WIN	LOW	ELIM										
10	Márcia	LOW	IN	IN	IN	ELIM												
11	Leonardo	WIN	IMM	LOW	ELIM													
12	Hugo	IN	ELIM															

Key

- The cook won MasterChef Celebridades.
- The cook was the runner-up.
- The cook won the individual challenge (Mystery Box or Elimination Test).
- The cook was one of the top entries in the individual challenge but did not win.
- The cook did not have to compete in that round and was safe from elimination.
- The cook was not selected as a top or bottom entry in an individual challenge.
- The cook was one of the bottom entries in the Mystery Box and received a disadvantaged in the Elimination Test.
- The cook was on the winning team in the Team Challenge.
- The cook was on the losing team in the Team Challenge.
- The cook was one of the bottom entries in an individual challenge but was saved first.
- The cook was one of the bottom entries in an individual challenge but was saved last.
- The cook won the Reinstation Challenge and returned to the competition.
- The cook was not eligible to compete in that round.
- The cook had to withdraw from the competition.
- The cook was disqualified from MasterChef Celebridades
- The cook was eliminated from MasterChef Celebridades.

== Ratings and reception ==
Season	Timeslot (BRT)	Premiered		Ended		TV season	SP viewers (in points)	Source
Season	Timeslot (BRT)	Date	Viewers (in points)	Date	Viewers (in points)	TV season	SP viewers (in points)	Source
1	Tuesday 10:30 p.m.	November 18, 2025	1.2	January 20, 2026	1.2	2025–26	1.08	

- Each point represents a specific number of households in São Paulo.
  - 2025: 77.488 households.
  - 2026: 78.780 households.

=== Brazilian ratings ===
All numbers are in points and provided by Kantar Ibope Media.

Episode	Title	Air date	Timeslot (BRT)	SP viewers (in points)	BR viewers (in points)	Ref.
1	Top 12	November 18, 2025	Tuesday 10:30 p.m.	1.2	Outside top 10	
2	Top 11	November 25, 2025	Tuesday 10:30 p.m.	1.0	Outside top 10	
3	Top 10	December 2, 2025	Tuesday 10:30 p.m.	0.9	0.9	
4	Top 9	December 9, 2025	Tuesday 10:30 p.m.	0.9	Outside top 10	
5	Top 8	December 16, 2025	Tuesday 10:30 p.m.	1.2	0.9	
6	Top 7	December 23, 2025	Tuesday 10:30 p.m.	0.9	Outside top 10	
7	Top 6	December 30, 2025	Tuesday 10:30 p.m.	1.0	0.8	
8	Top 5	January 6, 2026	Tuesday 10:30 p.m.	1.3	0.9	
9	Top 4	January 13, 2026	Tuesday 10:30 p.m.	1.2	Outside top 10	
10	Winner announced	January 20, 2026	Tuesday 10:30 p.m.	1.2	0.9	

- In 2025, each point represents 270.631 households in 15 market cities in Brazil (77.488 households in São Paulo).
- In 2026, each point represents 277.669 households in 15 market cities in Brazil (78.780 households in São Paulo).
