= Camila Rodrigues (actress) =

Brazilian actress (born 1983)

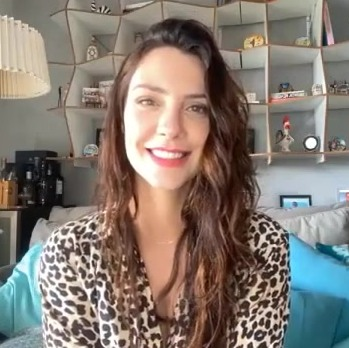
- Rodrigues in 2021
- Born: Camila Minosso Rodrigues; 23 August 1983 (age 42); Santo André, Sao Paulo, Brazil
- Occupation: Actress
- Years active: 2005–present
- Spouses: Bruno Gagliasso (m. 2006; div. 2008); Roberto Costa (m. 2012; div. 2016)
- Partner: Vinicius Campanario
- Children: 1

Camila Minosso Rodrigues (born 23 August 1983) is a Brazilian actress. She is known for her roles as Nefertari in the soap opera Os Dez Mandamentos and Sophia Alencar in Topíssima.

== Career ==
Before embarking on her acting career, Rodrigues studied fashion, but ended up dropping out upon concluding that her calling was to be an actress. She graduated from the Casa das Artes de Laranjeiras (CAL) theater school.

Rodrigues began her career in 2005 on TV Globo, when she played the character Mariana de Oliveira ("Mari"), sister of the protagonist Sol in the soap opera América.

Her film debut was in 2006 in the film O Cavaleiro Didi e a Princesa Lili, where she played Lili as an adult.

After her television debut, Rodrigues participated in productions such as Sitio do Pica-Pau Amarelo, Desejo Proibido and Malhação.

Years later, in 2012, Rodrigues signed a contract with Record, the channel where she currently works. Since then, Rodrigues has participated in several projects, gaining international fame with her character Nefertari in Os Dez Mandamentos (2016). In addition, Rodrigues also presented Família Record in 2016 alongside Sergio Marone and participated in the fourth season of Dancing Brasil in 2018.

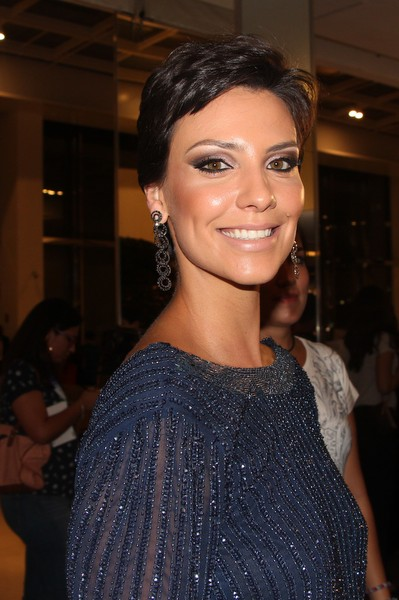
Rodrigues in 2016

In 2019, she was initially cast in the miniseries Jezabel, but ultimately chose to join the cast of Topíssima, where she played the character Sophia Loren Alencar. In it, she played a rich, successful and independent businesswoman, her first leading role in a soap opera. The character, inspired by the character played by Sandra Bullock in the film The Proposal, stood out for her profile as an empowered woman, addicted to work, but portrayed with lightness and humor. Her performance was praised, especially for her on-screen chemistry with Felipe Cunha, who portrayed her love interest in the story. In 2020, the actress briefly reprised the role in a guest appearance on the soap opera Amor sem Igual.

The following year, she was cast as the main antagonist in the third season of the soap opera Gênesis, marking her return to the biblical genre after six years. In the plot, she played Nadi, an ambitious and manipulative character, with emphasis on her strategies of approaching and seducing, aiming to achieve her goals. In 2022, she was invited to join the cast of the soap opera Reis, but ended up leaving the project due to pregnancy, being replaced by Francisca Queiroz. Two years later, she returned to Record TV to play the antagonist of the series A Rainha da Pérsia, in the role of the powerful Persian queen Vashti, reimagined in this new version under the name Amestris.

== Personal life ==
During the filming of the soap opera América in 2005, Rodrigues began dating actor Bruno Gagliasso. In August 2006, the couple got married. They announced their separation in March 2008, and the divorce was finalized in May 2008. Rodrigues began dating businessman Roberto Costa in early 2011, and the couple got married in October 2012; they announced their divorce in September 2016 after separating in April of the same year.

On 1 June 2022, Rodrigues announced her pregnancy on social media. She gave birth to her first child, a son, on 6 November 2022, the result of her relationship with businessman Vinicius Campanario.

== Filmography ==
=== Television ===
Year	Title	Role	Notes	Ref.
2005	América	Mariana "Mari" de Oliveira		
2006	Sítio do Picapau Amarelo	Fada Lua	Episodes: "14–17 de agosto"	
2006	Dom	Manu	TV Globo New Year's special	
2007	Amazônia	Ciça		
2007	Desejo Proibido	Guilhermina Mendonça		
2007–09	Malhação	Prof. Teresa Lopes		
2012	Rei Davi	Merabe		
2013	José do Egito	Tamar		
2013	Tá Tudo em Casa	Ritinha	Rede Record New Year's special	
2014	Milagres de Jesus	Ioná	Episodio: "A Cura do Paralítico de Cafarnaum"	
2014	Plano Alto	Melissa		
2015	Os Dez Mandamentos	Nefertari		
2016	Família Record	Presenter	Rede Record New Year's special	
2017	Sem Volta	Juliana Parnasio Coelho		
2017	Belaventura	Princesa Carmona Montebelo e Luxemburgo		
2018	Dancing Brasil	Contestant (7th place)	Season 4	
2019	Topíssima	Sophia Loren Alencar		
2020	Amor sem Igual	Sophia Loren Alencar	Episode: "20 de fevereiro"	
2021	Gênesis	Nadi		
2024	A Rainha da Pérsia	Amestris/Vashti		
2024	Neemias	Amestris/Vashti	Episode: "30 de setembro"	

=== Film ===
Year	Title	Role	Notes	Ref.
2006	O Cavaleiro Didi e a Princesa Lili	Princess Lili (adult)		
2013	A Garota Mais Estranha do Mundo	Herself	Short film	
2016	The Ten Commandments: The Movie	Nefertari		
2016	Milagres de Jesus - O Filme	Ioná		
2016	O Último Virgem	Jacqueline "Jaque"		

== Theatre ==
Year	Title	Role	Ref.
2006	Aldeia dos Ventos	Princess Desirée	
2006	Beijos de Verão	Clara	
2007	O Baile	Amelia	
2008	Vida a beira mar	Rosa	
2010-11	Decameron - A Comédia do Sexo	Nilda Ferreira	
2013	Pequeno Dicionário Amoroso	Marta	
2015	Os Homens não Menstruam	Elanda	

== Awards and nominations ==
Year	Award	Category	Title	Result	Ref.
2016	Troféu Internet	Best Actress	Os Dez Mandamentos	Nominated	
2019	Prêmio Contigo!	Best Actress	Topíssima	Nominated	
2019	Prêmio Notícias de TV	Best Actress	Topíssima	Nominated	
2019	Prêmio Área VIP	Best Actress	Topíssima	Nominated	
