= The Ten Commandments - The Movie =

2016 film directed by Alexandre Avancini

The Ten Commandments: The Movie
- Theatrical release poster
- Directed by: Alexandre Avancini
- Screenplay by: Vívian de Oliveira
- Based on: Os Dez Mandamentos
- Produced by: RecordTV
- Starring: Guilherme Winter; Sérgio Marone; Camila Rodrigues; Giselle Itié; Petrônio Gontijo; Gabriela Durlo; Larissa Maciel; Denise Del Vecchio; Marco Antônio Gimenez; Vera Zimmermann; Paulo Gorgulho
- Distributed by: Paris Filmes
- Release date: 28 January 2016
- Running time: 120 min
- Country: Brazil
- Language: Portuguese
- Box office: R$116.4 million ($36.4 million)

The Ten Commandments (Portuguese: Os Dez Mandamentos - O Filme) is a 2016 Brazilian film released by RecordTV in an association with Paris Filmes. It is an adaptation of the eponymous television series presented by Rede Record in 2015, with new footage and different developments of which were shown in its last chapter on television.

The adaptation was written by Vivian de Oliveira and directed by Alexandre Avancini, with the same cast as the soap opera.

It was produced by the Universal Church of the Kingdom of God, a controversial evangelist church in Brazil.

Earning over R$116.4 million, The Ten Commandments is currently the fourth highest-grossing Brazilian film.

== Plot ==
The film tells the story of Moses leading the Israelite people out of Egypt into the promised land. The plot has the loose adaptation of four books of the Bible that have this trajectory: Exodus, Leviticus, Numbers and Deuteronomy. Welcomed by Pharaoh's daughter as a baby, Moses grows as an Egyptian Prince, but turns against his adoptive family in favor of the suffering people of Israel, whom he should lead to liberty.

== Background ==
The soap opera The Ten Commandments is considered biblical teledramaturgy. In 2010, RecordTV launched the first product on television with this theme, with the debut of the 10-episode miniseries, The Story of Esther. In 2011, the 18-episode minisseries Samson and Delilah debuted. In 2012, it was the time of King David, with 30 episodes. In 2013, Joseph from Egypt debuted, with 38 episodes. In 2014, the series Miracles of Jesus debuted with 18 episodes in the first season, and in 2015 the second season premiered with 17 episodes.

The film is an adaptation of the eponymous soap opera produced by Record and broadcast from 23 March to 23 November 2015. This is the first biblical novel produced in the world. Broke records of ratings and topped the most-watched Primetime shows. After the last episodes of the first season in 2015, the network announced the film on 19 November 2015.

== Reception ==
=== Box office ===
On 1 January 2016, Cinemark movie network started the pre-sale of tickets for the film. On 7 January, more than 401,000 tickets had been sold.

The Universal Church of the Kingdom of God released the film and asked the faithful to buy tickets and donate to others. In Recife one person bought 22,700 tickets for R$220,000, according to the website UOL. Universo Online website also reported that, despite this strategy, journalists found empty rooms at the premiere of the film in São Paulo. In a first note on its official website, UCKG vehemently denied the information, stating that "the church has never forced anyone to perform any act" and criticized the news. In another note, UCKG also denied an information about vacancies in sessions, stating that "they were not pre-sale but marketed in piecemeal fashion."

About 10.8 million tickets have been sold since the debut of the film, making The Ten Commandments the second largest audience in Brazil's cinema history. However, Folha de S.Paulo points out that the list made by Ancine mentions "public", not "sold tickets". while several sessions of the film had empty seats even with all tickets sold. After two weeks, the film grossed R$42 million.

=== Critical reception ===
The film received generally negative reviews from critics, who reproached its narrative, acting, editing and adaptation of 176 chapters into two hours. Renato Marafon, from Cinepop website gave the film one star and a half out of 5, with an emphasis on "disjointed scenes and lack of focus on the main characters" and stressed the "modern slangs" used in a production about Ancient Egypt. Renato Hermsdorff, from AdoroCinema website, also gave the film a rating of one star and a half out of 5, writing that "characters come and go at a crazy pace, preventing the viewer from understanding exactly what is happening," and described the technical point of view the film as "exaggerated and poor [...] from the scenery to the costumes, everything reminds a great parade of carnival." Folha de S.Paulo in its online version written by Inácio Araújo, criticized the narrative, script, casting and editing of the film, but praised the action scenes, "in particular the special effects" but also criticized the use of slow motion in them. Giovanni Rizzo, from Observatório do Cinema, gave the film 1 star out of 5, saying that "the sound mixing is poorly crafted and sometimes the audio bursts and it's impossible to understand what a character says." Roberto Sadovski, writing a review on his blog in UOL, has heavily criticized the film, as the lack of context in important scenes as the relationship between Moses and Pharaoh, and the "visual poverty and inadequate cast and scenarios."

=== UCKG promotion ===
The UCKG was criticised for heavily promoting the film at their services, and asking those attending for money to buy tickets for those who could not afford them; pastors at church services distributed envelopes with the Ten Commandments logo, and asked for them to be filled with money and returned to help the "cause", interspersed with stressing the importance of tithing 10% of salary, plus extra donations, every month.

== Cast ==
Actor/Actress	Character
Guilherme Winter	Moisés
Sérgio Marone	Ramsés
Camila Rodrigues	Nefertari
Giselle Itié	Zípora
Petrônio Gontijo	Aarão
Sidney Sampaio	Oséias/Josué
Larissa Maciel	Miriã
Denise Del Vecchio	Joquebede
Paulo Gorgulho	Anrão
Gabriela Durlo	Eliseba
Giuseppe Oristânio	Paser
Vera Zimmermann	Henutmire
Eduardo Lago	Disebek
Lisandra Souto	Amália
Luciano Szafir	Meketre
Vitor Hugo	Corá
Juliana Didone	Leila
Felipe Cardoso	Zelofeade
Marcela Barrozo	Betânia
Babi Xavier	Tais
Nanda Ziegler	Judite
Victor Pecoraro	Ikeni
Rayana Carvalho	Adira
Tammy di Calafiori	Ana
Thierry Figueira	Aníbal
Pérola Faria	Deborah
Licurgo Spinola	Num
Roberta Santiago	Karoma
Paulo Reis	Eldade
Rafael Sardão	Uri
Renato Livera	Simut
Rocco Pitanga	Jahi
Jorge Pontual	Menahem
Kiko Pissolato	Bakenmut
Fernando Sampaio	Gahiji
Bruno Padilha	Datãn
Sandro Rocha	Abirão
Bianka Fernandes	Abigail
Thaís Müller	Jerusa
Carlos Bonow	Ahmós
Brendha Haddad	Inês
Bernardo Velasco	Eleazar
Rodrigo Vidigal	Caleb
Kátia Moraes	Bina
Julio Oliveira	Chibale
Jeniffer Setti	Safira
Aisha Jambo	Radina
Marco Antônio Gimenez	Nadabe
Binho "Fabio" Beltrão	Aoliabe
Erich Pelitz	Jairo
José Victor Pires	Amenhotep
Igor Cosso	Bezalel
Adriana Garambone	Yunet
Heitor Martinez	Apuki
