= Caminhos do Coração =

Brazilian telenovela series

- Caminhos do Coração titlecard.
- Genre: Telenovela; Sci-Fi; Fantasy
- Created by: Tiago Santiago
- Directed by: Alexandre Avancini
- Starring: Bianca Rinaldi; Leonardo Vieira; Gabriel Braga Nunes among others
- Theme music composer: Vinícius de Moraes and Carlos Lyra
- Opening theme: "Sabe Você", performed by Toni Garrido
- Country of origin: Brazil
- Original language: Portuguese
- No. of episodes: 240

Production
- Production locations: RecNov, Rio de Janeiro
- Camera setup: Multiple-camera setup
- Running time: 55 mins. approximately

Original release
- Network: Rede Record
- Release: August 28, 2007 – June 2, 2008

Related
- Os Mutantes: Caminhos do Coração

Caminhos do Coração (English: Ways of the Heart) is a Brazilian telenovela aired on Rede Record. Created by Tiago Santiago and directed by Alexandre Avancini, it was replaced by a spin-off called Os Mutantes: Caminhos do Coração, airing since June 3, 2008.

== Plot ==
The plot develops around Maria Luz who is accused of killing Dr. Socrates Mayer, owner of one of the largest private clinics in the country, Progênese. Dr. Júlia, an affiliated physician of Progênese created genetically modified human beings, mutants with superpowers. Júlia has always maintained a secret laboratory on the fictional island of Arraial, where she performs the experiments that originated the mutants. She is helped by Gór, who has the power of hypnosis, and the superintelligent child Eugênio.

Maria Luz has lived in the circus of Don Peppe with her parents Ana Luz and Pepe all of her life. She is the main attraction of the circus where she was raised and met first love interest Fernando. Maria is also the best friend of Juanita, her sister-in-law. Maria falls out of love with Fernando when he gets involved with Esmeralda. After Maria discovers that she is an adopted child, she finds herself in a tight spot: the police find her lying near Socrates' dead body and accuse her of killing him. Maria then discovers that her real father is the person she is accused of killing. This was set up so that Maria could not inherit Socrates's large wealth.

The Mayer family belongs to São Paulo's traditional elite. It is composed of the brothers Sócrates, Aristóteles and Platão Mayer. Ari is widowed and has three mutant children: Toni, who can deviate from bullets and has over human strength, Rodrigo, who has hypnotic powers, and Danilo, who has super agility and marries Lucinha to hide his homosexuality from his father. Platão is married to Irma and has two daughters: Regina and Cléo, who are discovered to have the powers of survival and astral projection. The Mayer family is one of the shareholders of Progênese, together with Mauro Fontes and Josias Martinelli. Josias is married to Cassandra and is the father of Lucas, who reads thoughts, and Janete, who has the power of clairvoyance.

After her arrest, Maria is helped by federal police officer Marcelo Montenegro, with whom she falls in love. Marcelo had recently been widowed by the death of Mabel who was poisoned. The poisoned sweet that killed his wife was intended to be eaten by his mutant daughter Tatiana. By helping Maria to escape from the prison, Marcelo becomes a fugitive from the law and the couple go through several adventures to escape the unscrupulous commissioner Taveira, who feels an unanswered desire for Maria.

Platão and Josias are murdered when they discover who is responsible for Socrates', Dr. Walker's (an American researcher who discovered the truth about the mutants) and Mabel's deaths. Maria and Marcelo are seeking to discover who hired serial killer Eric Fulisy to commit all the crimes.

It is revealed in the last chapter that Júlia hired Fulisy. She also hired attorney César Rubicão to kidnap Maria, when she was still a baby, and leave her anywhere. He chooses to leave her at the circus. Thirty years later, Socrates reveals that he would leave his entire wealth to a foundation, shocking his family. Afraid that it would harm her experiments, Júlia hired Eric to kill him and put Maria on the crime scene because she knew that Socrates would leave Maria his fortune if they ever met each other again. She suspected that if Maria received his wealth, she would close Progênese and harm her experiences. Júlia then decided to eliminate all those who discovered or suspected that she was responsible for Socrates' death. She also hired Eric to kill Rosana and nurse Ruth among other failed killing attempts. Helga, former wife of Eric, who became a better person after leaving him, also suffered attacks, as did Tatiana, Marcelo and Maria.

The season ended with Rubicão revealing in court, via hologram, who was responsible for the crimes. In the following season, Os Mutantes: Caminhos do Coração, Júlia drank some of the youth serum that she produced and adopted the pseudonym of Juli Di Trevi.

== Cast ==
=== Main cast ===
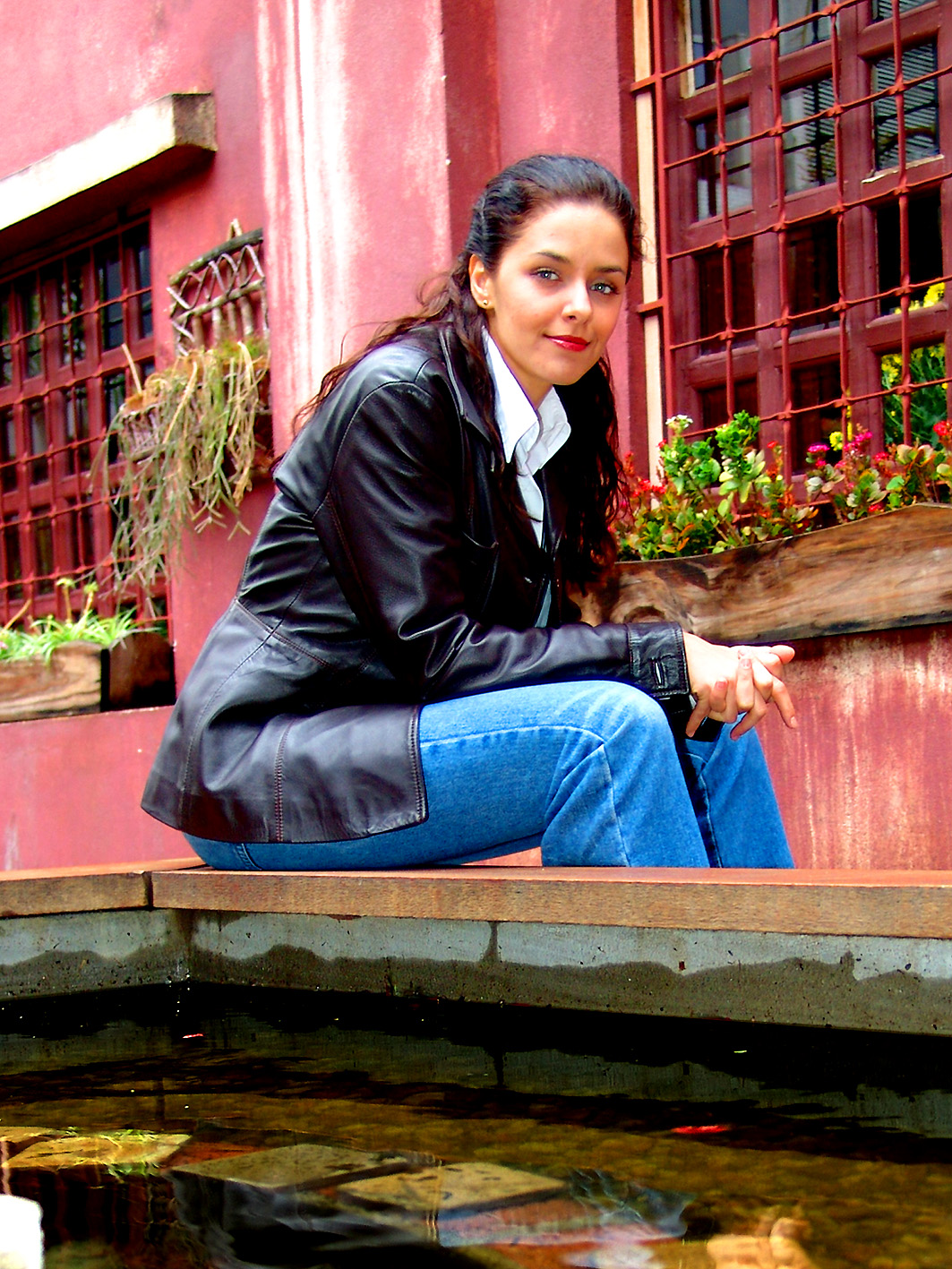
Bianca Rinaldi

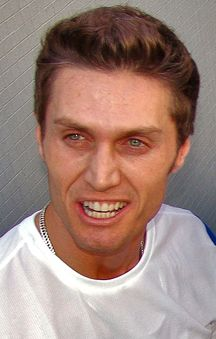
André Segatti

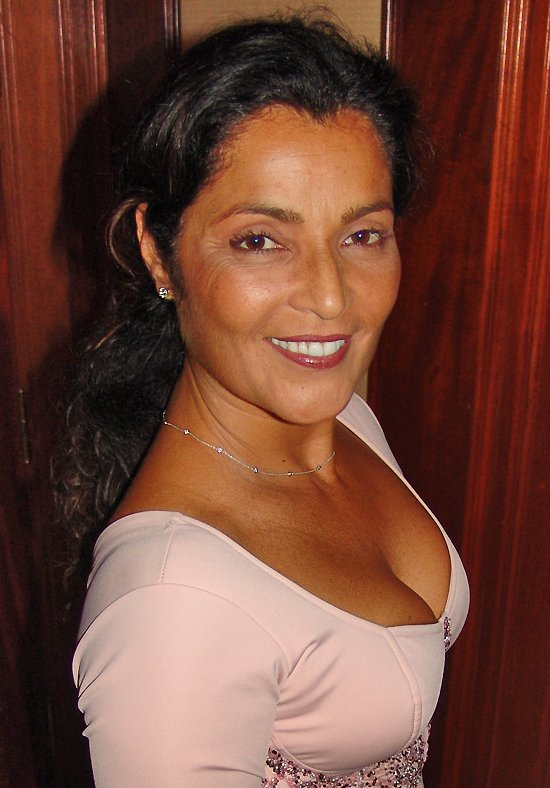
Angelina Muniz

- Bianca Rinaldi - Maria Beatriz dos Santos Luz (Maria Mayer)
- Leonardo Vieira - Marcelo Duarte Montenegro (Gabriel Lage)
- Ítala Nandi - Dra. Júlia Zaccarias
- Gabriel Braga Nunes - Taveira (Sigismundo Taveira)
- Tuca Andrada - Eric Fusilly (Werewolf)
- Cássio Scapin - César Rubicão
- Julianne Trevisol - Górgona (Gór)
- Felipe Folgosi - Roberto Duarte Montenegro (Beto)
- André de Biase - Aristóteles Mayer (Ari)
- Patricya Travassos - Irma Mayer
- Angelina Muniz - Cassandra Fontes Martinelli
- Giselle Policarpo - Cléo Mayer
- Liliana Castro - Janete Fontes Martinelli
- Jean Fercondini - Lucas Fontes Martinelli
- Paulo Nigro - Antônio Mayer (Toni)
- Ângelo Paes Leme - Rodrigo Mayer
- Cláudio Heinrich - Danilo Mayer
- Fernanda Nobre - Lúcia Rocha Mayer
- Natasha Haydt - Paola Riccete
- Jéssica Golcci - Alice Bandisnki
- Thaís Fersoza - Célia (Celinha)
- Mônica Carvalho - Amália Fortunato
- Daniel Aguiar - Vladmir (Vlado)
- Karen Junqueira - Fury
- Sacha Bali - Matheus Morpheus (Metamorfo)
- Preta Gil - Helga Silva da Silveira
- Lana Rodes - Esmeralda Nascimento Justo
- André Segatti - Ernesto Justo
- Rafaela Mandelli - Regina Mayer
- Taumaturgo Ferreira - Batista (Tarcísio Batista)
- Eduardo Lago - Luís Guilherme Batista Figueiredo (Guiga)
- Andréa Avancini - Érica Figueira
- Pedro Malta - Eugênio Menezes Figueiredo
- Maurício Ribeiro - Cristiano Pena (Cris)
- Ana Paula Moraes - Marli da Silva
- Fafá de Belém - Ana Gabriela dos Santos Luz
- Perfeito Fortuna - Pepe Luz
- Fernando Pavão - Noel Machado (Noé)
- Guilherme Trajano - Dino Malafatti
- Anna Markun – Juanita Biavatti (Snake Woman)
- Théo Becker - Fernando Biavatti (Big Snake)
- Natália Guimarães - Ariadne
- Allan Souza Lima - Meduso
- Maria Carolina Ribeiro - Silvana Madiano
- Louise D'Tuani - Ísis
- Andressa Oliveira - Raquel Lins
- Helder Agostini - Demétrio
- Bruno Miguel – Lúpi / Lobo
- Patrícia de Jesus - Perpétua Salvador
- Suyane Moreira - Iara
- André Mattos - Pachola (Paulo Pachola)
- Helena Xavier - Simone dos Santos
- Sebastião Vasconcelos - Mauro Fonte
- José Dumont - Teófilo Magalhães
- Juliana Xavier - Ágatha Magalhães
- Sérgio Malheiros - Aquiles Magalhães
- Rômulo Estrela - Draco
- Rômulo Arantes Neto - Telê
- Diego Christo - Hélio Bezerra
- Rocco Pitanga - Carvalho (Armando Carvalho)
- Marina Miranda - Marisa Gama
- Marcos Suhre - Ice Man
- Juliana Martins - Marlene França
- João Paulo Silvino - Lion
- Joaquim de Castro - Adolfo
- Ricardo Macchi - Goliath
- Daniel Marinho - Capeletti
- Fábio Nascimento – Minotauro
- Carolina Chalita - Marialva
- Márcio Libar - Vagabond

=== Children and teenagers ===
- Letícia Medina - Tatiana Montenegro (Tati)
- Sérgio Malheiros - Aquiles Magalhães
- Juliana Xavier - Ágata Magalhães
- Pedro Malta - Eugênio Figueira (Small Genius)
- Shaila Arsene - Clara Figueira (Clarinha / Lighting)
- Júlia Maggessi - Ângela Figueira (Small Angel)
- Cássio Ramos - Valfredo Pachola (Vavá / Wolfboy)

=== Guest stars ===
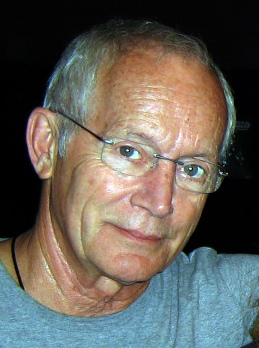
Lance Henriksen

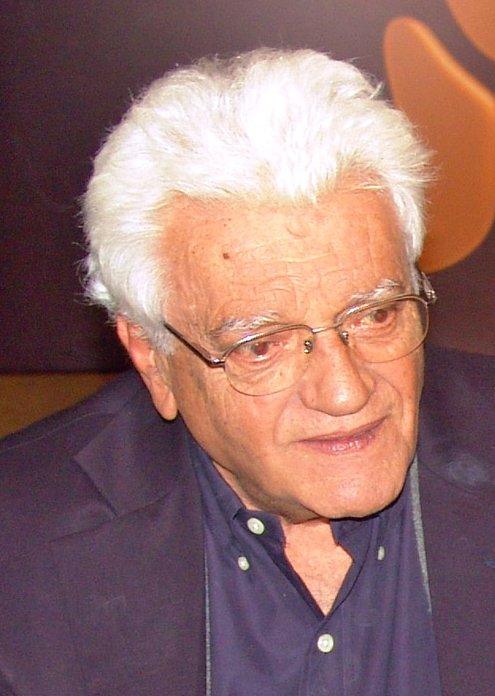
Walmor Chagas

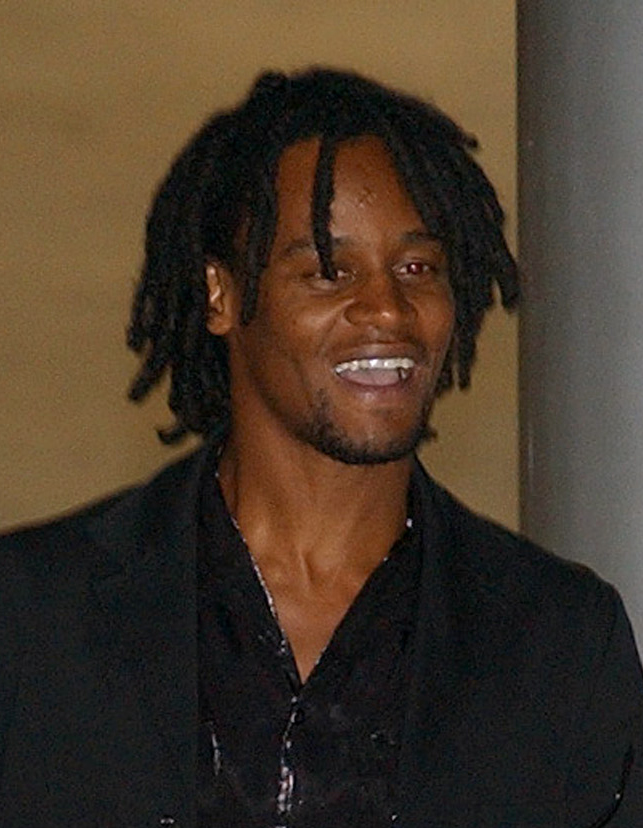
Toni Garrido

- Eduardo Munniz - Policial
- Walmor Chagas - Dr. Sócrates Mayer
- Lance Henriksen - Dr. Christopher Walker
- Ricardo Petraglia - Platão Mayer
- Paulo Gorgulho - Josias Martinelli
- Alexandre Barillari - Ramon Fusilly
- Nanda Ziegler - Bianca Fischer
- Amandha Lee - Felina
- Ana Rosa - Dalva Duarte Montenegro
- Regina Maria Dourado - Altina Pachola
- Ronnie Marruda - Pedreira (Micael Pedreira)
- Lígia Fagundes - Leonor Batista
- Maria Ceiça - Rosana Magalhães
- Adriana Quadros - Teresa Rocha
- Tammy Luciano - Ivoredo Cavalcanti
- Babi Xavier - Júli D'Trevi
- Myriam Pérsia - Mariana Mayer
- Toni Garrido - Gustavo Gama (Gúdi)
- Gabriela Moreyra - Graziela Machado (Grazi)
- Déo Garcez - Benedito Gama (Bené)
- Karina Bacchi - Glória
- Maria Cláudia - Ruth
- Raquel Nunes - Keila Nunes
- Sabrina Greve - Mabel Montenegro
- Mário Cardoso - Bento nete
- Bianca Joy Porte - Valéria
- Augusto Vargas - Cassiano Dias
- Raymundo de Souza - Figueroa (Juan Figueroa / Pablo Figueroa)
- Carlos Thiré - Jean Pierre
- Françoise Forton - Juíza
- Daniel Andrade - Zé Doido
- Java Mayam - Joca
- Paloma Bernardi - Luna
- José Loreto - Scorpio
- Jorge Pontual - Felipe Matoso
- Ana Carbatti - Dr. Beatriz
- Cíntia Moneratt - Edite
- Maria Sílvia - Magda
- Úrsula Corona - Alícia
- Gabriel Macri - Pedro
- Luiz Nicolau - Pé-de-Cabra
- Luciano Leme - Marino
- Amélia Soares - Maria Butina
- Rô Sant'Anna - Machadona (Ruthinéia)
- Maria Cristina Gatti - Corôa
- Kako Nolasko - Falcone
- Anderson Bruno - Zé Sinistro
- Thiago Luciano - civil policeman
- Márcio Rosário - taxi driver in Miami

== Audience ==
On February 6, 2008, Caminhos do Coração became the first Rede Record telenovela to achieve the first place on the São Paulo TV rank. On that day, it was watched by around 1,2 million households (approximately 5 million people) in the city. A soccer match between Corinthians and Barueri aired by Rede Globo during the same timeslot was watched by 1,1 million households (around 4,4 million people). In its peak, the telenovela was watched by 1,5 million households (near 6 million people).

The last chapter of Caminhos do Coração achieved an audience of more than 5 million people in São Paulo. It was the highest audience for a Record telenovela since the last chapter of controversial Vidas Opostas. This high rate made A Favorita achieve the worst telenovela debut in Globo's history.

== Soundtrack ==
- "Sabe Você" - Toni Garrido (opening theme)
- "Maria, Maria" - Roupa Nova (theme of Maria)
- "Grande Amor" - Fafá de Belém (theme of Maria and Marcelo)
- "Raça" - Fafá de Belém and Milton Nascimento (theme of Esmeralda and Ernesto)
- "Caçador de mim" - 14 Bis (general theme)
- "Mutante" - Preta Gil (theme of Helga)
- "A vida é minha" - Capital Inicial (theme of Irma and Aristoteles)
- "Zigue Zague" - Jair Rodrigues featuring Jair Oliveira and Simoninha (theme of Batista)
- "Procurando a Estrela" - Zé Ramalho and Daniela Mercury (theme of Teófilo and the Well-Doing League)
- "The Game of the Life" - Scorpions (theme of Eric and the Evil-Doing League)
- "Baby" - Tim Maia (theme of Lúcia and Danilo)
- "Sonho de Ícaro" - Byafra (theme of the children)
- "Robocop Gay" - Mamonas Assassinas (theme of Danilo)
- "Sexo" - Oswaldo Montenegro (general theme)
- "Cais" - Milton Nascimento (theme of Teófilo)
- "Samba de uma Noite Só" - Fernando Cavallieri (theme of Rodrigo, Amália and Célia)
