= Belaventura =

- Genre: Telenovela
- Created by: Gustavo Reiz
- Written by: Gustavo Reiz
- Directed by: Ivan Zettel
- Starring: Bernardo Velasco; Rayanne Morais; Camila Rodrigues; Leandro Lima; Adriana Birolli; Helena Fernandes; Giuseppe Oristanio; Juliana Didone; Kadu Moliterno; Floriano Peixoto; Giselle Itié; Larissa Maciel
- Opening theme: Instrumental
- Country of origin: Brazil
- Original language: Portuguese
- No. of episodes: 134

Production
- Production location: Rio de Janeiro
- Camera setup: Single-camera
- Production company: Casablanca

Original release
- Network: RecordTV
- Release: July 25, 2017 – January 26, 2018

Belaventura is a Brazilian telenovela produced by Casablanca and broadcast on RecordTV. The series premiered on July 25, 2017, replacing the rerun of A Escrava Isaura, and concluded on January 26, 2018, after which it was replaced by the rerun of Os Dez Mandamentos. The main cast includes Bernardo Velasco, Rayanne Morais, and Camila Rodrigues.

Set in medieval times, the telenovela depicts a love story between a prince and a plebeian. The story revolves around their romance as they navigate life in the chaotic kingdom of Belaventura, where constant conflicts and wars erupt. The kingdom's castle remains under the watchful eyes of numerous guards.

== Synopsis ==
In the early 15th century, the centuries-long war between Redenção and Valedo - led by dukes Otoniel and Severo - concludes with a peace agreement that unites the two realms, forming the kingdom of Belaventura. Otoniel ascends to the throne following a dispute at a medieval tournament. He is the father of Prince Enrico, the noble Lizabela, and the bitter Carmona, who secretly resents her brother for not being chosen as heir to the throne. Carmona will stop at nothing to claim the crown. All are children of Queen Vitoriana, who is mysteriously poisoned during the tournament and dies. Severo is wrongfully accused of her death and forced into exile for many years. In Enrico’s care are the young heirs, raised by Elia, a childless nanny. At the age of ten, Enrico meets Pieta, a peasant girl with whom he falls deeply in love, a feeling he cannot forget.

Fifteen years later, Pieta has grown into a strong young woman, raised by her abusive, alcoholic stepfather Biniek. Her mother, Lucy, vanished after enduring relentless persecution from the Pure Order, a fanatical group advocating for witch hunts, led by the cunning Cedric, the king’s advisor.

Years later, Enrico and Pieta reunite, their forbidden love undiminished. Determined to be together, they resolve to fight for their future, even if it means Enrico must renounce his claim to the throne. Their guide and protector is Bartolton, the kingdom’s wise sage, guardian of its deepest secrets, who aids them in their quest to bridge the gap between royalty and commoners. Severo returns to the kingdom, his heart consumed by hatred and a thirst for vengeance. His wife, Marion - a duplicitous and ambitious duchess who has never reconciled herself to not becoming queen - manipulates him relentlessly. Marion will stop at nothing to achieve her ambitions, including maneuvering her husband into conspiring against Otoniel. She is also the lover of Fernão, the family counselor, though Severo’s mother, Leocadia, has never accepted her. Marion bides her time, waiting for the perfect moment to reveal her true nature. Marion and Severo are the parents of Jacques, Arturo, and Brione, who secretly loves Gonzalo, a commoner.

The arrival of Selena, a determined archer, promises to bring unexpected twists to this enchanting and captivating tale.

== Cast ==
- Bernardo Velasco as Enrico Montebelo e Luxemburgo
- Rayanne Morais as Pietra Florenza
- Camila Rodrigues as Carmona Montebelo e Luxemburgo
- Leandro Lima as Jacques de Alencastro Bourbon
- Adriana Birolli as Lizabeta Montebelo e Luxemburgo
- Helena Fernandes as Marión Alencastro Bourbon
- Giuseppe Oristanio as Cedric
- Juliana Didone as Brione de Alencastro Bourbon
- Kadu Moliterno as Otoniel Montebelo e Luxemburgo II
- Floriano Peixoto as Severo Alencastro Bourbon
- Giselle Itié as Selena
- Larissa Maciel as Lucy Florenza
- Esther Góes as Leocádia de Alencastro Bourbon
- Alexandre Slaviero as Gonzalo Castroneves
- Bemvindo Sequeira as Páris La Rosie
- Angelina Muniz as Matriona Mascate
- Alexandre Barillari as Tácitus Mascate
- Eri Johnson as Corinto
- André Mattos as Falstaff
- Bárbara Borges as Polentina Alvarez
- Paulo Gorgulho as Bartolion
- Leonardo Franco as Mistral

=== Guests ===
- Juliana Knust as Vitoriana Montebelo e Luxemburgo
- Bia Passos as Young Pietra
- Gabriel Ferrarini as Young Enrico
- Rafaella Maia as Young Lizabeta
- Luis Augusto Formal as Young Jacques
- Luiz Eduardo Toledo as Young Gonzalo

== Ratings ==
| Season | Timeslot (BRT/AMT) | Episodes | First aired | | Last aired | |
| Season | Timeslot (BRT/AMT) | Episodes | Date | Viewers (in points) | Date | Viewers (in points) |
|---|---|---|---|---|---|---|
| 1 | Mon–Fri 7:40pm | 134 | July 25, 2017 | 8.1 | January 26, 2018 | 5.5 |
