= Nanda Ziegler =

- Born: Juiz de Fora, Minas Gerais, Brazil
- Occupation: Actress

Nanda Ziegler is a Brazilian actress, producer, and fashion model. She has appeared in several Brazilian TV series and films, most notably as Naamá 's in the acclaimed 2014 Brazilian series José do Egito, and as Bianca Fischer in 2008's in the acclaimed trilogy Caminhos do Coração, The Mutants: Pathways of the Heart, and Mutantes: Promessas de Amor.

== Early life ==
She was married to Alexandre Avancini.

== Career ==
Ziegler debuted with characters of great success in Brazilian soap operas. 2005 she debuted in Prova de Amor, playing the prostitute Gigi. This novel leveraged the audience the channel Rede Record. In 2007, it became prominent with the reporter Latífe of the Center for Investigative Journalism, "Vidas Opostas." Most of the scenes were shot in Tavares Bastos favela (slum).

In 2007, she was invited to play the vampire as Bianca Fischer in the trilogy: Caminhos do Coração, The Mutants: Pathways of the Heart, and Mutantes: Promessas de Amor. Due to the huge success, the trilogy lasted the years 2007 to 2009.

In 2011, Ziegler played Helena, the villain in the telenovela Rebelde produced by the channel Rede Record] along the Grupo Televisa.

In 2012, Ziegler produced and wrote the short film Passagem do Tempo, with scenes shot in Los Angeles, CA.

In 2013 she played Naamá, in the biblical story of José do Egito. The miniseries aired in Spanish on channel MundoFox in the United States. It had scenes shot in the Atacama Desert, Egypt, Israel and the studios of Rede Record.

She appeared in the feature film O Tempo Feliz Que Passou written and directed by André da Costa Pinto.

== Filmography ==
Film and television
| Year | Title | Role | Notes |
|---|---|---|---|
| 2005 | Prova de Amor | Gigi | |
| 2006 | Vidas Opostas | Latife | |
| 2007 | Caminhos do Coração | Bianca Fischer | |
| 2008 | Os Mutantes: Caminhos do Coração | Bianca Fischer | |
| 2009 | Mutantes: Promessas de Amor | Bianca Fischer | |
| 2011 | Rebelde | Helena Ambrust | |
| 2013 | José do Egito (miniseries) | Naamá | |
| 2013 | Pecado Mortal (telenovela) | Xuxú | |
| 2013 | Passagem do tempo | Sophia | Short film |
| 2014 | O Tempo Feliz Que Passou | Marli | In post-production |
| 2014 | Aspirin For Headache | Graziela Garcia | In post-production |
| 2015 | Os Dez Mandamentos | Judite | |
| 2016 | Os Dez Mandamentos (O Filme) | Judite | |
