= Maytê Piragibe =

Brazilian actress and keyboardist

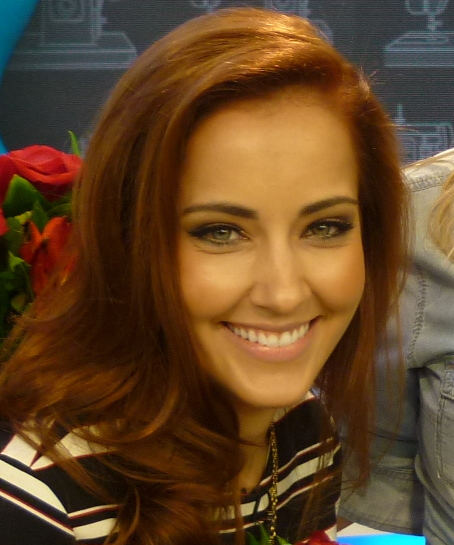
- Born: Maytê Bernardes Rodrigues Piragibe; 2 December 1983 (age 42); Rio de Janeiro, Brazil
- Occupations: Actress; Keyboardist
- Years active: 2001–present

Maytê Piragibe (born Maytê Bernardes Rodrigues Piragibe on December 2, 1983 in Rio de Janeiro, Brazil) is a Brazilian actress and keyboardist.

In 2017, Piragibe won the first series of Dancing Brasil (season 1).

== Television series ==
- Vitória (2014) – Renata
- José do Egito (2013) – Azenate
- Promessas de Amor (2009) – Natália (Nati)
- Os Mutantes: Caminhos do Coração (2008) – Natália (Nati)
- Vidas Opostas (2006/2007) – Joana de Souza
- Cidadão Brasileiro (2005/2006) – Eleni Castro
- Como uma Onda (2004) – Júlia
- O Beijo do Vampiro (2002/2003) – Lucinha
- Cidade dos Homens (2003) – Maya
- Carga Pesada (2002) – Episode: "O Passado Me Condena"
- Malhação (2001/2002) – Cast Support

== Movies ==
- Rinha (2008) – Fernanda

== Theater ==
- Homem Age em... (2008)
- Mulheres Solteiras Procuram (2007)
