= Petrônio Gontijo =

Brazilian actor

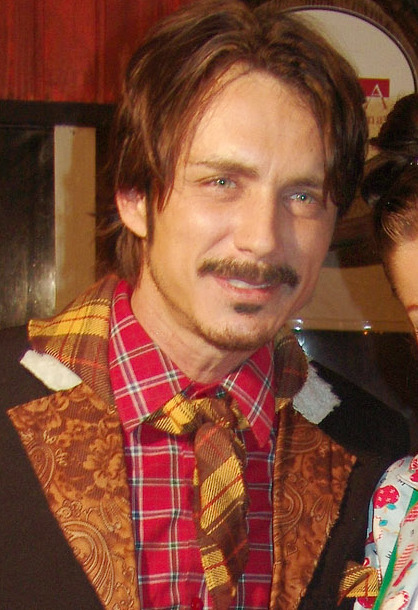
- Born: Petrônio Gontijo de Alvarenga; July 5, 1968 (age 57); Varginha, Minas Gerais, Brazil
- Occupation: Actor
- Years active: 1991–present

Petrônio Gontijo de Alvarenga (born July 5, 1968) is a Brazilian actor. He has appeared in numerous television series, films, and theater productions throughout his career.

== Filmography ==
=== Television ===
Year	Title	Role	Ref.
1991	Salomé	Duda	
1993	Olho no Olho	Marco Antônio	
1994	Pátria Minha	Murilo Henrique Pellegrini	
1995	Você Decide		
1995	Malhação	Gregório	
1996	Razão de Viver	Pedro	
1997	Os Ossos do Barão	Vicente	
1998	Serras Azuis	Gaius Gutemberg	
1999	Malhação	Priest Alexandre	
2000	Vidas Cruzadas	Zé Carlos	
2001	Pícara Sonhadora	Alfredo Rockfield	
2002	Marisol	João Vicente	
2004	Seus Olhos	Vitor	
2005	Essas Mulheres	Dr. Torquato Ribeiro	
2006	Cidadão Brasileiro	Gustavo	
2007	Luz do Sol	Antônio Vasconcelos (Tom)	
2008	Os Mutantes	Fredo Cavalcanti	
2009	Poder Paralelo	Rodolfo Castellammare (Rudi)	
2011	Insensato Coração	Roberto Fischer (Beto)	
2011	O Madeireiro	Júlio	
2012	Máscaras	Dr. Décio Navarro	
2016	Os Dez Mandamentos	Aarão	
2018	Jesus	Pedro	
2021	Gênesis	Jacó	
2023	Reis	Rei Davi	

=== Cinema ===
- 1992 - O Palco
- 2000 - Cronicamente Inviável
- 2001 - Memórias Póstumas - Brás Cubas (young)
- 2001 - Um Show de Verão - Isaac Freire
- 2002 - Mutante - Pedro
- 2002 - Ofusca
- 2003 - Tudo Que Ela Vê - Man
- 2003 - Cristina Quer Casar - Viriato Benucci
- 2006 - Boleiros 2 - Vencedores e Vencidos - Rafael Benitez
- 2016 - Os Dez Mandamentos: O Filme - Aarão
- 2018 - Nada a Perder - Edir Macedo
- 2019 - Nada a Perder 2 - Edir Macedo
