= Brendha Haddad =

Brazilian actress (born 1986)

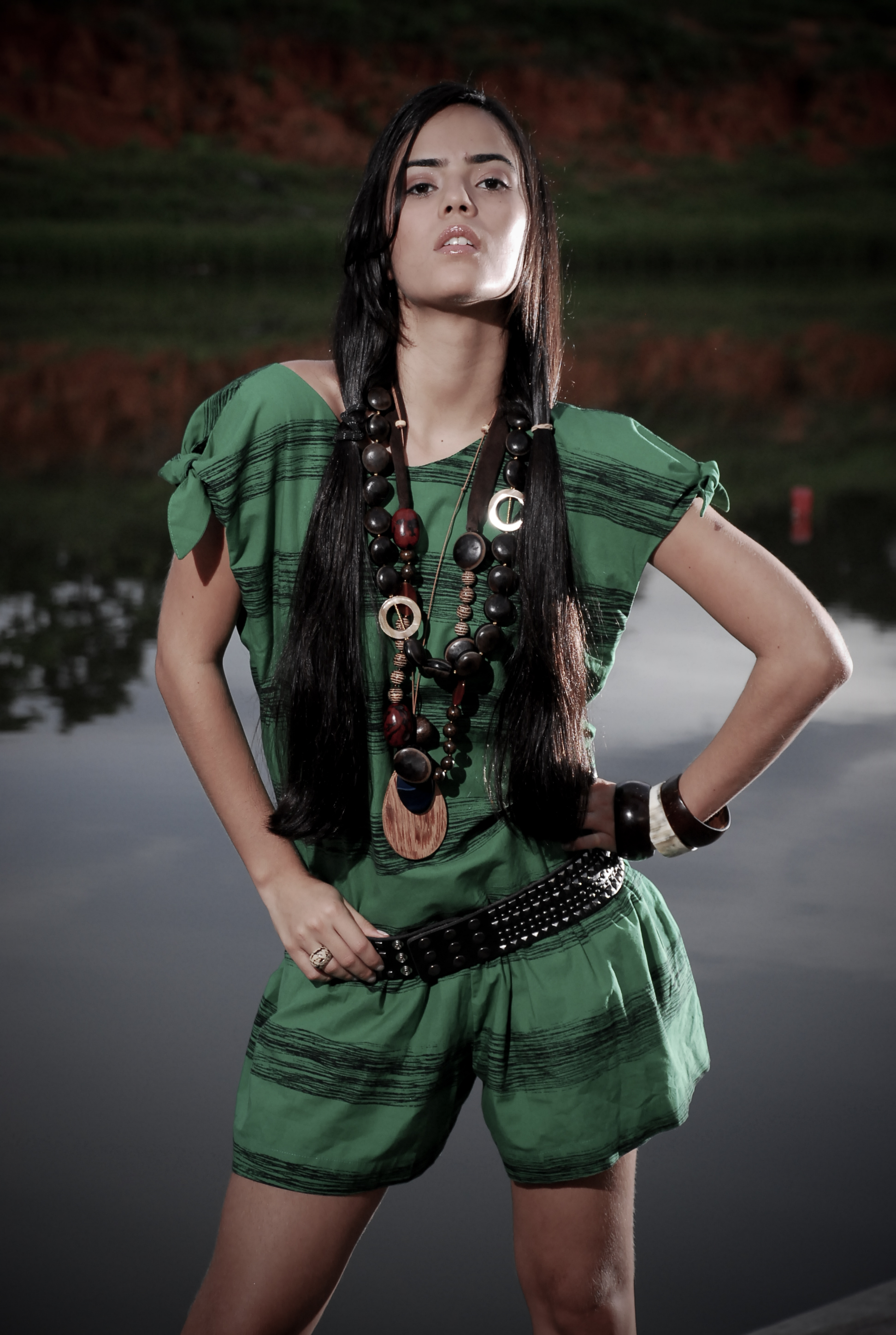
- Born: Brendha Prata Haddad; April 12, 1986 (age 40); Rio Branco, Brazil
- Occupation: Actress
- Height: 1.65

Brendha Prata Haddad (April 12, 1986 in Rio Branco, Acre) is a Brazilian actress.

At 3 years, she was paraded in the capital of Acre. At 12, she won the Miss Brazil Child, Paraná. Although now want to pursue an acting career at an early age, his father, a doctor Eduardo Haddad, caused her to postpone the start of his career. In 2006, now studying at the Faculty of Law, Brendha did the tests in his hometown for the miniseries Amazônia, de Galvez a Chico Mendes, shown in 2007. And that's when she got her first role, Ritinha.

== Career ==
=== Television ===
Television
Year	Title	Role	Notes
2007	Amazônia, de Galvez a Chico Mendes	Ritinha	
2007	Mulas do Tráfico	Vânia	
2008	Beleza Pura	Ipanema	Special participation
2009	India – A Love Story	Rani Meetha	
2010	Hora 3:00	Beatriz	
2012	Salve Jorge	Neuma	
2014	Acerto de Contas	Raquel	
2015	Milagres de Jesus	Lívia	Episode: "A Mulher Cananéia"
2015	Santo Forte	Joyce	
2015	Os Dez Mandamentos	Inês	
2016	A Terra Prometida	Inês	
2017	Apocalipse	Hannah Koheg	First phase

=== Films ===
Television
Year	Title	Role	Notes
2013	Genesis	Akassia Ferraz	
2014	Suriname Gold	Magali Silva	Short film
2016	The Ten Commandments: The Movie	Inês	
