= Dayenne Mesquita =

Brazilian actress

Day Mesquita
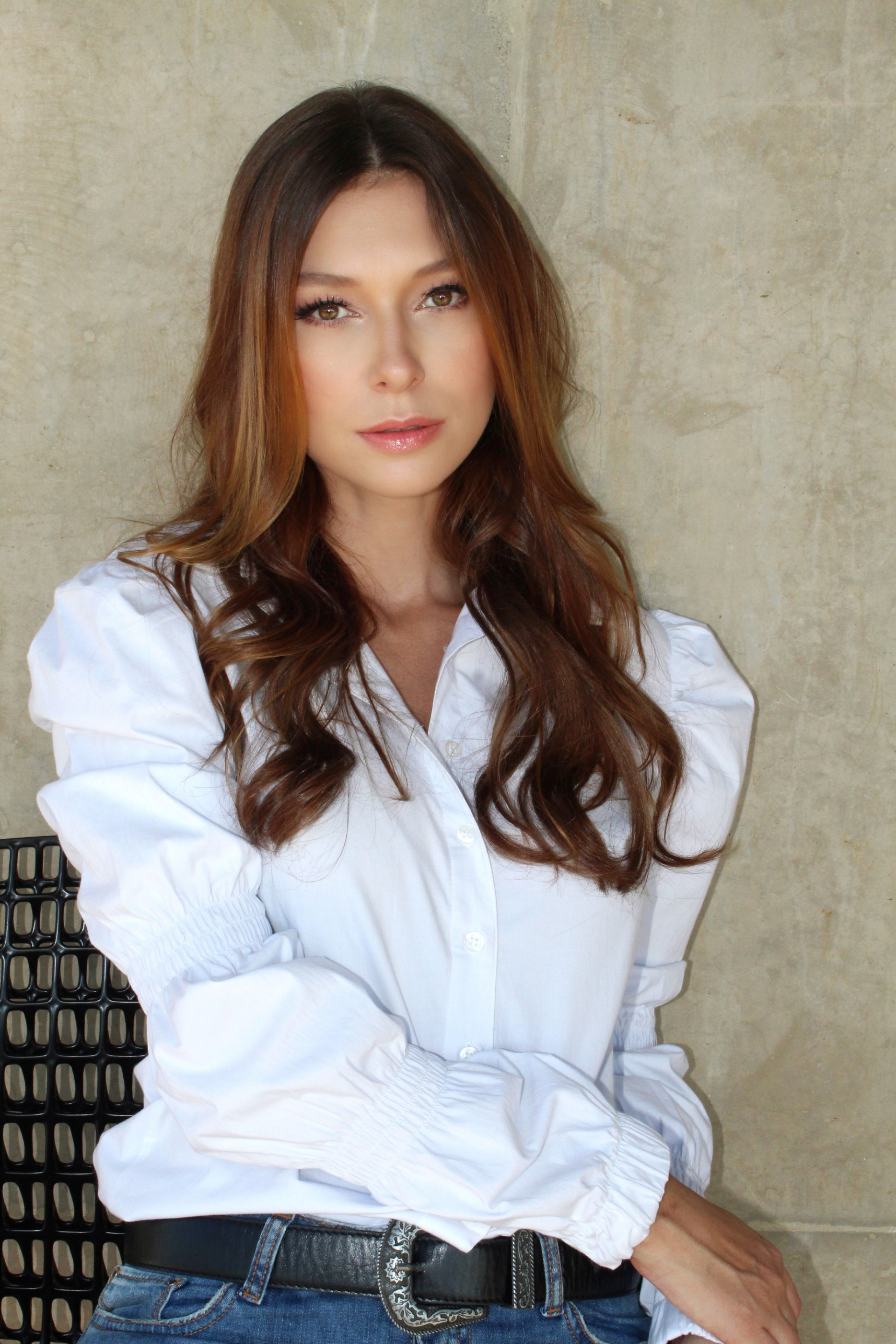
- Mesquita in May 2021
- Born: Dayenne Proença Mesquita; September 23, 1985 (age 41); Telêmaco Borba, Paraná, Brazil
- Occupation: Actress
- Years active: 2007–present

Dayenne Proença Mesquita (born September 23, 1985), best known as Day Mesquita, is a Brazilian actress who played the lead role in two telenovelas.

== Career ==
Born in Telêmaco Borba, before becoming an actress, Dayenne Mesquita studied theater, classic ballet and jazz, and because of that, she won the role of the lead antagonist, Amanda Vasconcelos in 2007 Rede Bandeirantes' telenovela Dance Dance Dance.

After playing the lead role in an episode of Lendas Urbanas, in 2008, she was cast in the lead role as Eliana Vilela, a character who falls in love with her adoptive brother, in 2009 SBT's telenovela Vende-se um Véu de Noiva.

She guest starred in two Rede Globo telenovelas after that, Morde e Assopra in 2010, and A Vida da Gente in 2011. Dayenne Mesquita played the lawyer Stela in the 2012 telenovela Cheias de Charme She played Fernanda in the 2013 telenovela Além do Horizonte.

Dayenne Mesquita played the young Yunet in the first phase of the 2015 telenovela Os Dez Mandamentos. She played Ioná in the 2016 telenovela A Terra Prometida.

Mesquita has acted in religious roles, including playing the wife of Edir Macedo in the biopic Nada a Perder and Mary Magdalene in the TV series Jesus. Although born into a Roman Catholic family, Mesquita now follows Buddhist philosophy.

== Filmography ==
Year	Title	Role	Notes
2007–2008	Dance Dance Dance	Amanda Vasconcelos	Lead antagonist
2008	Lendas Urbanas	Carolina (Carol)	Lead role (episode "Lenda: A Casa Do Bosque e a Flor")
2009–2010	Vende-se um Véu de Noiva	Eliana Vilela	Lead role
2012	Cheias de Charme	Stela	Main cast
2013	Além do Horizonte	Fernanda	Main cast
2014	(Des)encontros	Diana	Main cast
2015	Os Dez Mandamentos	Yunet (first phase)	Main cast
2016	A Terra Prometida	Ioná	
2016	O Negócio	Flávia	
2018	Nada a Perder	Ester	
2018	Jesus	Maria Madalena	
2019	Amor sem Igual	Angélica Silva Viana / Poderosa	
2024	Família é Tudo	Marta	Guest star
