= Larissa Maciel =

Brazilian actress (born 1977)

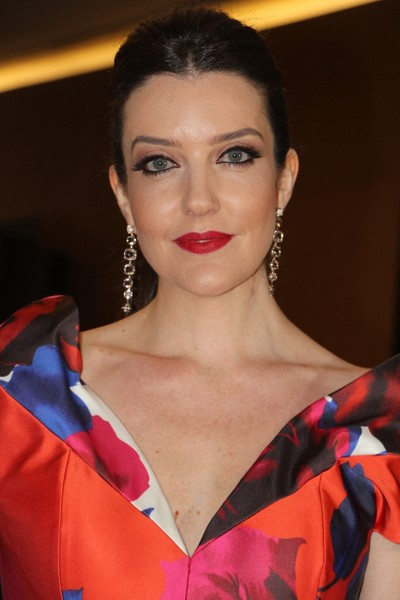
- Born: Larissa Maciel Kummer; 31 October 1977 (age 48); Porto Alegre, Rio Grande do Sul, Brazil
- Occupation: Actress
- Years active: 1996-present
- Spouse: André Surkamp
- Children: Milena Kummer

Larissa Maciel (born 31 October 1977 in Porto Alegre) is a Brazilian actress.

== Biography ==
Larissa Maciel became widely known in Brazil after interpreting the singer Maysa in the miniseries produced by Rede Globo in 2009.

Maciel won about 203 candidates until pleased the director Jayme Monjardim because of its tremendous resemblance to his mother. Larissa was involved about a year between preparation and recording of the miniseries, a new experience for the actress, formed in theatrical interpretation by the Universidade Federal do Rio Grande do Sul. The miniseries was nominated for an International Emmy in 2009 in the category of "Best TV Movie/Mini-Series".

== Filmography ==
- 2000 - Descompassado Coração - Luísa
- 2001 - Club
- 2005 - A Ferro e Fogo - Tempo de Solidão
- 2007 - A Visita
- 2009 - Maysa: Quando Fala o Coração
- 2010 - Passione
- 2013 - José do Egito
- 2015 - Os Dez Mandamentos
- 2017 - Belaventura
- 2018 - Jesus

== Cine ==
Year	Title	Paper
2006	A Festa de Margarette	
2012	Vazio Coração	Mariana Menezes
2012	Quinta das Janelas	Marta Fillale
2016	Os Dez Mandamentos - O Filme	

== Awards ==
São Paulo Association of Art Critics Awards

- APCA Trophy for best actress in Television

Prêmio Qualidade Brasil

- Best Actress in a Miniseries
