= Guilherme Winter =

Brazilian film and television actor

- Born: Guilherme Winter Nobrega de Almeida; August 28, 1979 (age 47); São Paulo, Brazil
- Occupation: Actor
- Years active: 2004–present
- Spouse: Giselle Itié (m. 2015)

Guilherme Winter Nobrega de Almeida (born August 28, 1979), commonly known as Guilherme Winter, is a Brazilian actor. He is best known for his portrayal of Moses in Os Dez Mandamentos.

== Biography ==
Before becoming an actor, he studied industrial design at the University Presbiteriana Mackenzie for one semester. While working in a holiday resort, he had his first experiences with theater.

In 2004, he moved to Rio de Janeiro, and began his acting classes at the Casa das Artes de Laranjeiras (CAL).

Guilherme is also a visual artist, drawer and painter. In the late 1990s he studied arts at the Panamericana arts school in São Paulo.

== Filmography ==
=== Television ===
Soap operas
Year	Title	Character
2006	Cobras & Lagartos	Flu Melutti
2009	Paraíso	Otávio Elias Barbosa
2010	Ti Ti Ti	Renato Villa
2012	Cheias de Charme	Anderson
2013	Encantadoras	Roberto Lima (Veludo)
2014	Manual Prático da Melhor Idade	Rafael
2015–2016	Os Dez Mandamentos	Moses
2018	Jesus	Judas Iscariot
2019	Topíssima	Guilherme Lima
Series and Miniseries
Year	Title	Character
2007	Malhação	Tiago Junqueira
2011	Tapas & Beijos	Valdinei
2012	As Brasileiras	Hugo
2013	José do Egito	Rubén
Films
Year	Title	Character
2011	Azul Marinho Preto e Branco (curta-metragem)	Tão
2016	The Ten Commandments: The Movie	Moses
2017	Desearás al hombre de tu hermana	
