= Denise Del Vecchio =

Brazilian actress

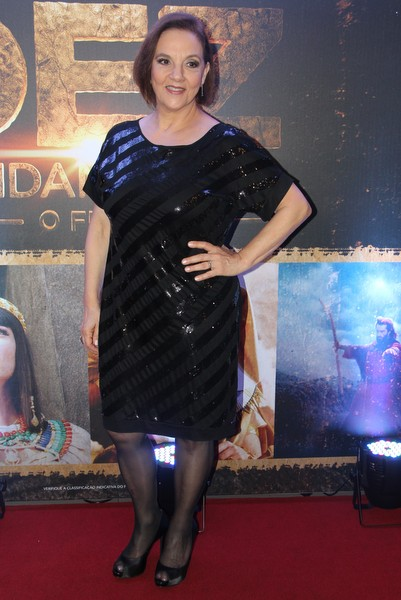
- Del Vecchio at the premiere of the film The Ten Commandments in 2016
- Born: Denise Del Vecchio Falótico; 3 May 1954 (age 71); São Paulo, Brazil
- Occupation: Actress
- Years active: 1971–present
- Spouses: Celso Frateschi (m. 1971; div. 1978) Ney Bonfante (m. 1986)
- Children: 1

Denise Del Vecchio Falótico (born 3 May 1954) is a Brazilian actress.

== Early life ==
Born in the Mooca neighborhood of São Paulo, Denise comes from a lower middle-class family of Italian, Portuguese, and Syrian descent.

== Career ==
She began her career at age 15, at the Arena Theater in São Paulo in the early 1970s. She attended Vida e Morte Severina starring Cacilda Becker in her last performance, in 1969.

She studied Bertolt Brecht at the Auguste School, and soon afterwards decided to stage dialogues of the philosopher Plato with her philosophy class. Thereafter her interest in theater became fundamental. She studied with Emilio Fontana, in TBC, and after six months went to Teatro de Arena, where she became professional, interrupting its formation.

She appeared in Memórias da Lua, by Tuna Dwek, of the Aplauso Collection, of the Official Press of the State of São Paulo, which was released in February 2008.

== Personal life ==
Denise married actor Celso Frateschi with whom she performed in the theater and in the miniseries José do Egito. The couple has a son André Frateschi who is an actor, director and musician.

== Filmography ==
=== Television ===
Year	Title	Role	Notes
1974	Ídolo de Pano	Rita de Cássia (Renée)	
1975	Um Dia, o Amor	Adriana	
1977	Um Sol Maior	Betty	
1978	O Direito de Nascer	Rosário	
1979	O Todo Poderoso	Carmem Sílvia	
1982	Maria Stuart	Roberta	
1982	Pic-nic Classe C	Marieta	
1982	Os Imigrantes - Terceira Geração	Marinha	
1983	Acorrentada	Laura	
1983	Pecado de Amor	Helga	
1984	A Máfia no Brasil	Anita	
1988	Fera Radical	Olívia Flores Mendes	
1989	Colônia Cecília	Duzolina	
1989	Top Model	Lia	
1990	Mãe de Santo	Prazeres	
1991	Ilha das Bruxas	Alma	
1991	Felicidade	Dinorah	Phase 1
1992	Anos Rebeldes	Dolores	
1994	A Viagem	Glória Gusmão	
1994	As Pupilas do Senhor Reitor	Joana	
1995	Tocaia Grande	Jacinta	
1997	Os Ossos do Barão	Rosa	
1997	Você Decide		Episode: "Vida Dupla"
1997	O Desafio de Elias	Rebeca	
1998	Serras Azuis	Netinha	
1999	Força de um Desejo	Bárbara Ventura	
2000	Malhação	Yolanda Albuquerque Castro (Ioiô)	Season 7
2002	Esperança	Soledad	
2003	Chocolate com Pimenta	Dona Mocinha Limeira da Silva	
2004	Como uma Onda	Mariléia Paiva	
2006	JK	Naná (Maria da Conceição Kubitschek)	
2006	Linha Direta	Yara Amaral	Episode: "Bateau Mouche"
2006	Bicho do Mato	Alzira Santos Camargo Redenção	
2007	Louca Família	Argélia	RecordTV Special
2007	Amor e Intrigas	Celeste Camargo de Souza	
2009	Bela, a Feia	Vanda Alcântara	
2011	Vidas em Jogo	Augusta Figueira de Andrade (Augusto)	
2013	José do Egito	Leah	
2013	Pecado Mortal	Maria Das Dores Noronha	
2015	Milagres de Jesus	Keila	Episode: "O Endemoniado Cego e Mudo"
2015	Os Dez Mandamentos	Jochebed	
2017	O Rico e Lázaro	Elga	
2019	Topíssima	Madalena Oliveira Soares	

=== Films ===
Year	Title	Role
1977	Jecão, um Fofoqueiro no Céu	Jaqueline
1978	Doramundo	
1979	A Noite dos Imorais	Ana
1983	A Próxima Vítima	
2001	Lavoura Arcaica	Prostitute
2016	The Ten Commandments: The Movie	Jochebed
2018	Syndrome	Olivia

== Theater ==
Year	Title	Notes
1971	Teatro Jornal 1ª Edição	
1971	Arena conta Zumbi	
1972	Doce América, Latino América	
1972	Tambores na Noite	
1972	A Semana - Esses Intrépidos Rapazes	
1973	A Queda da Bastilha???	
1975	A Epidemia	
1977	Dois Homens na Mina	
1978	Os Imigrantes	
1979	Vejo um Vulto na Janela	
1979	Me Acuda que eu Sou Donzela	
1980	Ato Cultural	
1981	Lua de Cetim	
1981	Os Órfãos de Jânio	
1982	Mahagonny Songspiel	
1983	Feliz Ano Velho	1983–88
1985	Lembranças da China	
1986	Electra	
1988	Vestido de Noiva	
1989	O País dos Elefantes	
1991	Florbela Espanca	
1992	Cobras Voadoras	
1996	Três Maneiras de Dançar um Tango	
1997	Anchieta, Nossa hertória	
1998	Um Crime Perfeito	
1999	Somos Irmãs	
2000	Feliz Ano Velho	
2002	Silvia	
2003	Unha e Carne	
2004	A Máscara do Imperador	
2005	Sossego e Turbulência no Coração de Hortência	
2006	A Mentira	
2007	De Corpo Presente	
2007	Mar de Gente	
2008	A Estressada Doméstica	
2008	A Cabra ou Quem é Sylvia?	2008–09
2009	As Pontes de Madison	2009–10
2011	Circuito Ordinário	2011–12
2013	A Bala na Agulha	
2014	Trágica.3 – Electra Medéia Antígona	2014–17
2017	Aqui, Fora	
