= Draco (Caminhos do Coração) =

Draconis
- Portrayed by: Rômulo Estrela

In-universe information
- Alias: Dragon
- Gender: Male

Draconis, also known as Draco, is a fictional character from the soap-opera Os Mutantes - Caminhos do Coração. He is portrayed as a villain with the ability to create and manipulate fire, known as pyrokinesis. Draco serves as one of the primary antagonists in the series. He is a member of The Evil League, which opposes the protagonist group, The League of Good.

== Powers and abilities ==
Draco possesses the ability known as pyrokinesis, which allows him to create and manipulate fire.
