= Topíssima =

- Genre: Telenovela
- Created by: Cristianne Fridman
- Written by: Aline Garbati; Camilo Pellegrini; Carla Piske; Jussara Fazolo; Fabiana Reis; Marco Borges; Stephanie Mendes
- Directed by: Rudi Lagemann
- Starring: Camila Rodrigues; Felipe Cunha
- Opening theme: "Quem de Nós Dois" by Ana Carolina
- Country of origin: Brazil
- Original language: Portuguese
- No. of episodes: 145

Production
- Camera setup: Multi-camera
- Production companies: RecordTV; Casablanca

Original release
- Network: RecordTV
- Release: 21 May – 9 December 2019

Topíssima is a Brazilian telenovela produced by RecordTV and Casablanca that premiered on 21 May 2019 and ended on 9 December 2019. The series is written by Cristianne Fridman and directed by Rudi Lagemann. The series stars Camila Rodrigues, Felipe Cunha, Floriano Peixoto, Cristiana Oliveira, Sílvia Pfeifer, Maurício Mattar, Samara Felippo and Sidney Sampaio.

== Plot ==
Sophia is a beautiful, elegant, self-confident millionaire woman. A businesswoman ahead of the family empire, Alencar Group, a network of private universities. She served as vice president and will now hold the presidency if she meets a requirement imposed by her mother, Lara, a decadent and egocentric actress, to marry within 1 year. Sophia's combination of money and beauty attracts countless social climbers. She is aware of this and uses them in the same way that she feels used when they approach her for interest. However, she finally discovers love after an unexpected encounter with Antonio, a man of humble origin, that faces difficulties with confidence and optimism. Responsible for the family's support, he works as a taxi driver, as well as helping and managing his mother's restaurant in Morro do Vidigal.

== Cast ==
- Camila Rodrigues as Sophia Loren Alencar
- Felipe Cunha as Antônio "Toninho" Ramos Gonçalves
- Floriano Peixoto as Paulo Roberto Mendonça
- Felipe Cardoso as Detetive Pedro Almada
- Cristiana Oliveira as Lara Alencar Dominguez
- Sílvia Pfeifer as Marinalva "Mariinha" Ramos Gonçalves
- Sidney Sampaio as Delegado André Medeiros
- Rayanne Morais as Detetive Graça Ribeiro
- Denise Del Vecchio as Madalena Oliveira Soares
- Paulo Cesar Grande as José Carlos "Zeca" Oliveira Soares
- Cássia Linhares as Beatriz Nogueira de Mendonça
- Maurício Mattar as Carlos Dominguez
- Kadu Moliterno as Dagoberto Almada
- Rafaela Sampaio as Gabriela Ramos Gonçalves
- Marcelo Rodrigues Filho as Rafael "Rafa" Nogueira de Mendonça
- Vitor Novello as Vitor Menezes da Silva
- Guilherme Winter as João Fernandes Lima
- Eri Johnson as Detetive Edevaldo Guedes / Pierre
- Bruno Guedes as Edison Gusmão
- Miguel Roncato as Bruno Lopes
- Emílio Orciollo Netto as Taylor Smith
- Juliana Didone as Yasmin Barros
- Pérola Faria as Angélica Vasconcelos
- Cláudia Mello as Clementina Monteiro
- Bemvindo Sequeira as Adolfo "Canarinho" Constantino
- Suzana Alves as Inês Guedes
- Isabel Fillardis as Dr. Vera Martins
- Fabio Beltrão as Leonardo "Mão de Vaca" Almada
- João Villa as Zico "Sem Noção" Martins
- Amanda Richter as Isadora Ferraz
- Marcella Rica as Rebeca "Beca" Moura
- Thais Müller as Minha Flor Vilela
- Marcelo Arnal as Gustavo Torres
- Ingrid Conte as Elisabeth Siqueira
- Felipe Silcler as Milton "Zumbi" Albuquerque
- Letícia Peroni as Andréa Alencar Dominguez
- Guilherme Seta as Fernando Oliveira Soares
- Myrella Victória as Jade Bevilacqua Guimarães
- Karen Marinho as Aderlize Mendes
- Samuel Melo as Eduardo "Edu" Pereira
- César Pezzuoli as Walter
- Marcos Holanda as José
- Anita Amizo as Dr. Cláudia
- Juliana Lucci as Maria Duarte
- Clarissa Marinho as Caetana
- Prisma da Matta as Letícia
- Rodrigo Candelot as Nelson Martins
- Claudio Cinti as Gomes
- Chico Melo as Miguel
- Miguel Salabert as Geraldo
- Samya Peruchi as Creuza

=== Guest stars ===
- Samara Felippo as Thaís Bevilacqua
- Brenda Sabryna as Jandira Oliveira Soares
- Camilla Amado as Zilá da Silva
- Sérgio Menezes as Gonçalo
- Aline Riscado as Luciana Silveira
- Zé Carlos Machado as Valdir Silveira
- Nica Bonfim as Solange Silveira
- Ivan Rios as Caio
- Gilberto Torres as Dr. Alexandre
- Kauã Rodriguez as Bené
- Fábio Villa Verde as Joaquim Ferraz
- Adriana Prado as Flávia Ferraz
- Simone Soares as Helena Torres
- Solange Damasceno as Mrs. Solange
- Paulo Carvalho as Lara's judge
- Fabrício Assis as Formiga

== Ratings ==
Season	Timeslot (BRT/AMT)	Episodes	First aired		Last aired	
Season	Timeslot (BRT/AMT)	Episodes	Date	Viewers (in points)	Date	Viewers (in points)
1	Mon–Fri 7:45pm	145	21 May 2019	9	9 December 2019	10
