= Como uma Onda =

- Genre: Telenovela
- Created by: Walter Negrão
- Directed by: Dennis Carvalho; Mauro Mendonça Filho
- Starring: Ricardo Pereira; Alinne Moraes; Mel Lisboa; Henri Castelli; Herson Capri; Maria Fernanda Cândido; Laura Cardoso; Hugo Carvana; Denise Del Vecchio; Kadu Moliterno; Bianca Byington; Louise Cardoso; Tato Gabus Mendes; Débora Olivieri; Marcos Caruso; Débora Duarte; Elias Gleizer; Ernani Moraes
- Opening theme: "Como uma Onda"
- Composer: Lulu Santos
- Country of origin: Brazil
- Original language: Portuguese
- No. of episodes: 179

Production
- Running time: 45 minutes

Original release
- Network: TV Globo
- Release: November 22, 2004 – June 18, 2005

Related
- Cabocla; Alma Gêmea

Como uma Onda (Like a Wave) is a Brazilian telenovela that was produced and aired by TV Globo from November 22, 2004, and June 18, 2005.

It features Alinne Moraes, Ricardo Pereira, Henri Castelli, Herson Capri, Maria Fernanda Cândido, Kadu Moliterno, Joana Solnado, Hugo Carvana, Laura Cardoso and Mel Lisboa in the lead roles.

== Plot ==
At the beginning of the plot, Daniel Cascaes, who was born in the Açores, and falls in love with the Portuguese Almerinda. The girl's father, Admiral Figueroa, is conservative and does not accept the courtship of his daughter. He hires thugs to separate the couple. Thus, Daniel decides to escape by disguising himself as tourist guide.

During the flight, he meets the Brazilian businessman Synesius Paiva and his wife, Dondoca Marileia, along with daughters Nina and Lenita, who soon become interested in the boy. Daniel is also enchanted by Nina, but he remains devoted to Almerinda.

Daniel and Almerinda mark the day and time to flee Portugal, but the admiral's henchmen intercept the plane. Beaten and unconscious, Daniel is placed alone in an ocean liner and is sailed to Brazil.

Being a stowaway, Daniel gets stuck on the ship by order of the commander. But the sisters Nina and Lenita, who are also returning home, appear once more to help him. So Daniel get rid of the police and jumps into the sea. The waves eventually lead to far abroad, specifically to a fishing village in Santa Catarina, where he is rescued by a pair of sailors, Jigsaw Chin and Cherub. Filthy and ragged, Daniel discovers the harsh reality of the streets of Brazil.

No idea of the whereabouts of lovely Azorean family, Paiva returns to Brazil. The rest, however, are quickly consumed by problems in business: Synesius is shocked to discover that they are nearly bankrupt. Not bad for the plans of his partner, Jorge Junqueira, the dreaded JJ. The two share the helm of the company, but have very different profiles. Synesius is a worker who, with much effort, built an empire and became one of the biggest names in the fishing industry. JJ already took part of the command of the firm after the death of his father, and want to become the largest landowner in the country by sea.

But Daniel and Lenita find they can ensure the employment of Butler Marileia. Pivot of a dispute between Nina and Lenita, Daniel walks away, filled with memories of Almerinda and increasing concern for Nina. Gradually, the initial provocations between the two gives rise to romantic feelings. The love of Daniel and Nina will be shaken by Lenita, who is in love with Daniel and will do anything to take the sister of his life. Only Almerinda pregnant arrives in Brazil, ready to rediscover his great love and father of her son, Daniel. However, Lenita vai miserable your life to get her out of the way of Daniel. Lenita is capable of anything, including killing his sister and Almerinda.

In Florianópolis, in a village, the fishermen live. Lavinia is a strong woman who lives with her husband, Amarante and has a passionate marriage. She found support from him and gave birth to their daughter, Julia, the result of a relationship of adolescence. His mother Francisquinha, a blind lady, is a matriarch of the village and is always ready to give advice and to resolve conflicts. Among the residents there is Pedroca, a womanizer who loves a-tail skirt, while the woman -the battler Idalina- works hard at sewing.

But there is also a man: Sandoval. Just released from prison, he struggles to regain his dignity and find a place to rebuild his life.

== Cast ==
- Ricardo Pereira as Daniel Cascaes
- Alinne Moraes as Nina Paiva
- Mel Lisboa as Lenita Paiva
- Henri Castelli as Jorge Junqueira "J.J"
- Herson Capri as Sandoval
- Maria Fernanda Cândido as Lavínia
- Kadu Moliterno as Antônio Amarante
- Hugo Carvana as Sinésio Paiva
- Denise Del Vecchio as Mariléia Paiva
- Laura Cardoso as Francisquinha
- Bianca Byington as Encarnação Junqueira
- Joana Solnado as Almerinda
- Elias Gleizer as Bartolomeu "Old Bartô"
- Tato Gabus Mendes as Pedroca do Espírito Santo
- Louise Cardoso as Idalina "Dala"
- Marcos Caruso as Dr. Prata
- Débora Duarte as Alice Prata
- Gustavo Haddad as Conrado Prata
- Fernanda de Freitas as Amanda
- Débora Olivieri as Ana Amélia
- Ernani Moraes as Lauriclenes "Quebra-Queixo"
- Dudu Azevedo as Querubim
- Maytê Piragibe as Júlia
- Sérgio Marone as Rafael Prata
- Cauã Reymond as Floriano
- Sheron Menezzes as Rosário
- Yaçanã Martins as Jackie
- Mila Moreira as Virgínia Lemos
- Antônio Grassi as Roberto "Robusto" Augusto
- Eduardo Lago as Oswaldo
- Adriana Alves as Darcy
- Larissa Queiroz as Carolina "Carol" Lemos
- Nill Marcondes as Samuel "Samuca)"
- Amir Haddad as Menez
- Thaís Garayp as Abigail "Biga"
- Sirmar Antunes as Balbino
- Amandha Lee as Ilana
- Paco Sanches as Manjubinha
- Sérgio Malheiros as Franklin "Frank"
- Guta Gonçalves as Gilda "Gigi" Paiva
- Arthur Lopes as Rubico Junqueira
- Christina Rodrigues as Cliente de Mariléia
