= Juliana Didone =

Brazilian actress and former model

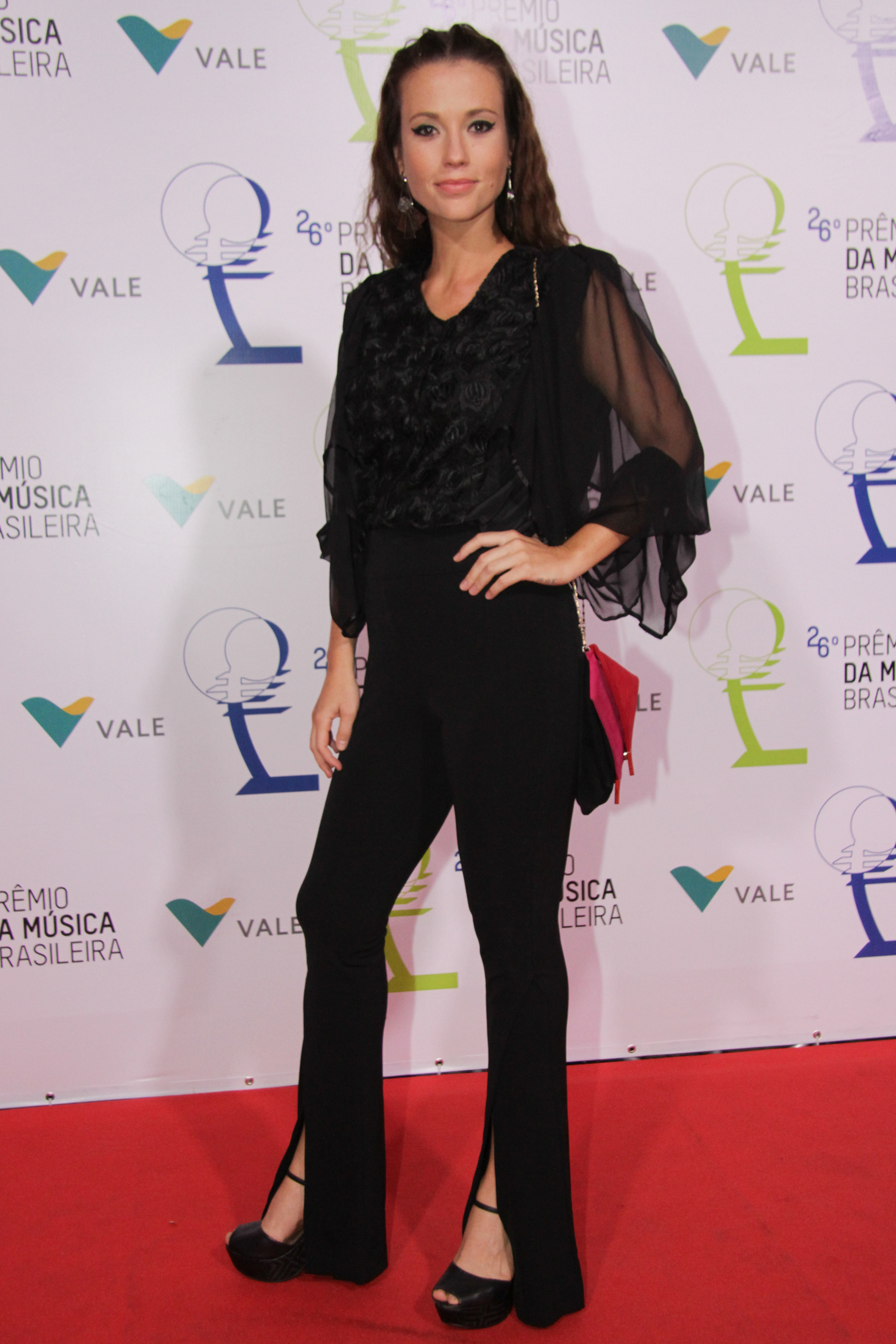
- Born: Juliana Didone Nascimento; October 11, 1984 (age 41); Porto Alegre, Rio Grande do Sul, Brazil
- Occupation: Actress
- Years active: 2002–present
- Height: 1.72 m (5 ft 8 in)

Juliana Didone Nascimento (born October 11, 1984) is a Brazilian actress and former model.

== Television career ==
Born in Porto Alegre, Rio Grande do Sul, she is best known for her role as Letícia Gomes da Silva, the main character of the 2004 season of the telenovela Malhação. She was also in the 2005 season of the telenovela.

Her career as an actress started when she played the role of the preteen character Mariana in the short movie Fora de Controle. When she was 12 years old, she participated of the child play named Caçadores de Aventuras, where she played the role of Cléo. Her first telenovela role was in Desejos de Mulher, in 2002, where she played the role of a Rio Grande do Sul model.

Juliana Didone has also acted in several television commercials of various companies, like Grendene, Halls, Guaraná Antarctica, and Shiseido, of Japan. In 2008, she starred the summer campaign of Agilitá, which is a dress company, and was on the cover of the May edition of Criativa magazine.

She played Lia in the 2010 Rede Globo telenovela Passione. Juliana Didone played Brigitte in the 2011 telenovela Aquele Beijo.

She signed a contract with Rede Record in 2013 and she was part of the cast of the first telenovela by the author Carlos Lombardi in that network, Pecado Mortal.

== Telenovelas ==
Year	Title	Role	Notes
2002	Desejos de Mulher	Tati	Telenovela
2003	Mulheres Apaixonadas	Luísa	Telenovela
2004–2006	Malhação	Letícia	Telenovela
2006	O Profeta	Baby	Telenovela
2007	Paraíso Tropical	Fernanda	Telenovela
2008	Casos e Acasos	Bianca	TV series
2008	Negócio da China	Celeste/Heaven	Telenovela
2009	Xuxa Especial de Natal	Pastorinha Encarnada	Special
2010	Passione	Lia	Telenovela
2011	Aquele Beijo	Brigitte	Telenovela
2013	Surtadas na Yoga	Leda	TV series
2013	Pecado Mortal	Leila Vergueiro and Maria Clara (twin sisters)	Telenovela
2015	As Canalhas	Tatiana	TV series
2015–2016	Os Dez Mandamentos	Leila	Telenovela
2015	O Hipnotizador	Livia	TV series
2017	Belaventura	Edite Brione	Telenovela
2022	Good Morning, Verônica	Mônica	TV series

=== Theater ===
Play
Year	Title	Role
1997	Caçadores de Aventuras	Cléo
2004	Beijos de Verão	Clara
2012	Decote	

=== Movies ===
Films
Year	Title	Role
2013	Colegas	Patrícia
2013	Meu Passado Me Condena	Laura
2015	Superpai	Patrícia Ellen
2016	The Ten Commandments: The Movie	Leila
2017	Memória Tangerina: Mulheres Legendadas	

== Model career ==
Juliana Didone started her model career when she was 14 years old, living in the Japanese city of Tokyo for seven months. She has also lived in São Paulo city during her model career. In December 2003, she posed for Trip magazine. In that year, she has also appeared in the Mulheres que Amamos (meaning Women we Love) section of the Brazilian Playboy magazine.

== Dancing with the Stars ==
In March 2006, Juliana Didone and her partner, Leandro Azevedo, won the Brazilian version of the TV reality show Dancing with the Stars, called Dança dos Famosos.
