= Sergio Marone =

Brazilian actor (born 1981)

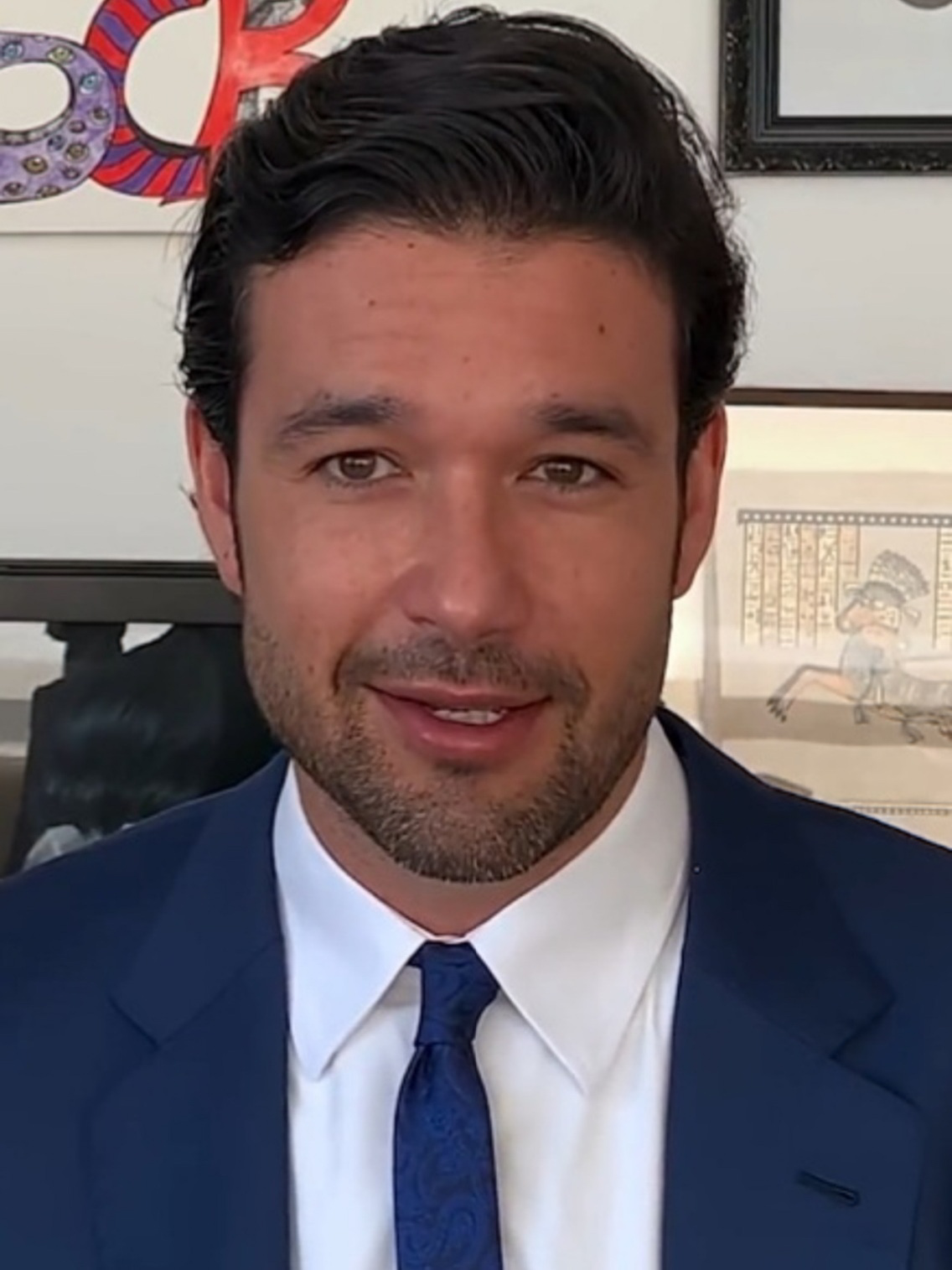
- Marone in 2020
- Born: Sergio Passarela Marone; February 4, 1981 (age 45); São Paulo, Brazil
- Occupation: Actor
- Years active: 1999–present
- Height: 6 ft 4 in (193 cm)

Sergio Passarella Marone (born February 4, 1981) is a Brazilian actor. He has appeared in numerous soap operas and recently posed for the Brazilian website "Paparazzo".

== Biography ==
Student of law, also attended the workshops of the group TAPA and the Teatro Escola Macunaíma in SP.

He premiered on TV in 2001 in the TV soap opera "Globo TV", in the role of the mysterious paranormal Santhiago, who protected the Crystal character (Sandy) from the villainous Charles Charles (Rodrigo Santoro). In 2001 he gained his first role as Cecéu in the popular soap opera "The Clone (2001)". In the plot, his character was lovingly involved with a girl addicted to drugs, interpreted by Deborah Falabella. Cecéu ends up getting hooked too and starts a fight to turn it around and end the addiction. The novela was a success and the storyline pulled the public's attention in such a way that it put the actor at the top of the ranks as the most recognized actor in the cast of TV Globo.

In 2002 he made his theater debut in the comedy "Secrets Only Men Have" adapted from the circuit off broadway by Bruno Mazzeo and Evandro Mesquita, who also directed and performed in the show that shocked the country, and played in the theaters of the main capitals.

In 2003 he brought to life the character, "Victor" in Malhação, a juvenile series of the TV Globo. When he ended his participation in the youth series he returned to the theater to make the controversial comedy of Lauro Cezar Muniz, "The Holy Child" directed by Luis Artur Nunes, alongside Roberto Bomtempo and José de Abreu, Had 5 nominations for the Shell Prize of RJ, the most important prize of the Brazilian theater. He went through diverse roles in popular theater like those of Angra and Curitiba. The debut, in RJ, was controversial, he came out on the cover of the main culture notebooks of the country's newspapers, a photo of the ex-man of "Malhação" kissing another actor (Roberto Bomtempo), in one of the scenes of the part.

In 2005 he played Rafa, a diver who is paraplegic, in the novel "Like a Wave" TV Globo.

In 2006/2007 he was in "Escravas do Amor" adapted and directed by João Fonseca from the chronicles of Suzana Flag (Nelson Rodrigues) with Cia Fodidos and Privilegiados. He had 2 nominations to the Shell Prize, costumes and direction. Marone co-produced a two-month special season of the show at Leblon in January and February 2007, thus having his first experience as both an actor AND producer.

In 2006, he returned to TV making a special participation in "Cobras & Lagartos", in his last chapters, playing Miguel, a boyfriend of Letícia (Cléo Pires), forming a love triangle between Letícia (Cléo Pires) and Luciano (Carmo Dalla Vecchia).

Also in 2006 he made his film debut in the film "Dreams and Desires", as Vaslav, a dancer who abandoned his art to dedicate himself to the fight against the dictatorship alongside his friend Saulo (Felipe Camargo). Directed by Marcelo Santhiago the film went through some festivals, taking 2 prizes in the Gramado.

In January and February 2010. Exactly a week after finishing Caras & Bocas premieres in SP, "PLay-On sex, lies and videotape" by Rodrigo Nogueira, direction Ivan Sugahara. They had been nominated to Shell and APTR as the best text. Freely inspired by the movie "Sex, lies and video tape," the play revolved around the country's main stages until the beginning of 2011.

In 2011, he made his third villain, Marcos, of Morde & Assopra. This time the character had a more serious villain tone.

In 2012 without even contract with Rede Globo he makes a participation in the novelinha Malhação where he already worked.

In the years of 2012 and 2013, the contest Miss Brazil, transmitted by Band.

== Filmography ==
Long & Short films
Year	Title	Role
2006	O Dono do Mar	
2006	Sonhos e Desejos	Vaslav
2012	Penetras de luxo	
2014	Bala Sem Nome	Ele mesmo
2014	Por Isso Eu Sou Vingativa	Augusto
2014	Prometo Um Dia Deixar Essa Cidade	Hugo
2009	Flordelis - Basta uma Palavra para Mudar	Alan
2016	The Ten Commandments: The Movie	Ramses
2016	Jesus Kid	
2016	O Jovem Messias	Dubladores José
2017	My Little Pony: The Movie	Rei Storm

Television
Year	Title	Role
2001	Estrela-Guia	Santiago/ Fernando
2001; 2002	O Clone	Maurício Valverde (Cecéu)
2003	Malhação	Victor Correia Amorin
2004; 2005	Como uma Onda	Rafael Prata (Rafa)
2006	Cobras & Lagartos	Miguel
2007	Paraíso Tropical	Umberto
2008	Casos e Acasos	Variação de personagens
2009; 2010	Caras & Bocas	Nicholas Silveira Lontra (Nick)
2011	Morde & Assopra	Marcos de Sousa
2012	Malhação	Lupe/ Lobo
2014	As Canalhas	Cid
2014	Por Isso Eu Sou Vingativa	Augusto
2014	Sexo e as Negas	Enéas
2015	Os Dez Mandamentos	Ramses
2016	Família Record	Presenter
2017	Hoje em Dia	Presenter
2017	Dancing Brasil	Reporter
2017	Apocalipse	Ricardo

== Awards and nominations ==
Year	Ceremony	Category	Nominated work	Result
2015	Prêmio F5	Actor Of the Year	Os Dez Mandamentos	Won
2016	Troféu Internet	Best Actor	Os Dez Mandamentos	Nominated
2023	Festival Sesc Melhores Filmes	Best National Actor	Jesus Kid	Pending
