= Julianne Trevisol =

Brazilian actress

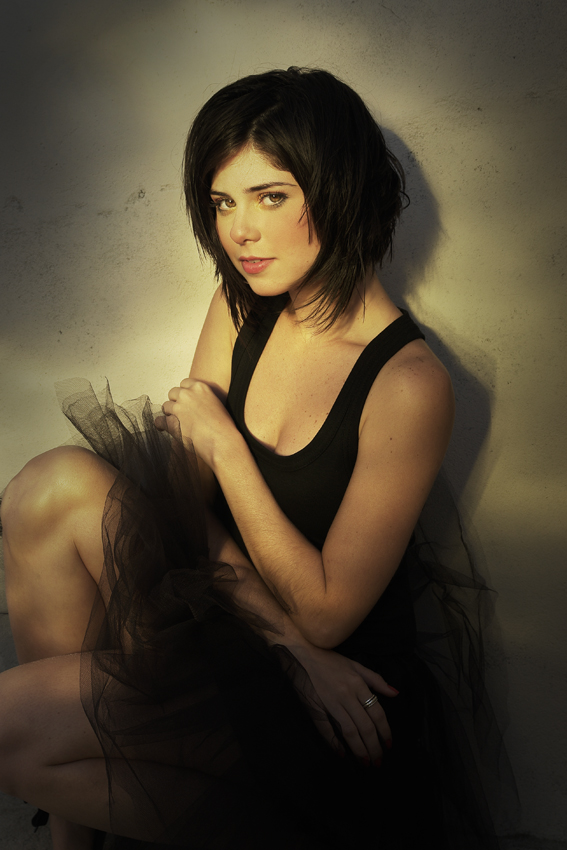
- Born: Julianne Oliveira de Almeida; 23 June 1983 (age 43); Rio de Janeiro, Brazil
- Occupation: Actress

Julianne Oliveira de Almeida (born 23 June 1983), professionally known as Julianne Trevisol, is a Brazilian film, television and stage actress, singer, acrobatic, ballet and top dancer. As an actress she is known for her roles in Rede Record's telenovelas such as; Floribella, Paixões Proibidas, Caminhos do Coração, Vidas em Jogo and Balacobaco.

== Biography ==
Trevisol started off her career at the age of 7 as a dancer. At 13 she performed in theatre. In 2015, she portrayed Maria Luisa in the 7 pm telenovela Totalmente Demais.

== Filmography ==
=== Television ===
Year	Title	Role
1999-03	Domingão do Faustão	Bailarina
2001	Os Normais	Call girl (Episode:"Um Programinha Normal")
2002	Malhação	Catarina (Episode:"13 de agosto")
2004	Zorra Total	
2005	Floribella	Olívia Fritzenwalden
2006	Paixões Proibidas	Mariana Araújo
2007	Caminhos do Coração	Górgona Meyer (Gór)
2008	Os Mutantes – Caminhos do Coração	Górgona Meyer (Gór)
2009	Mutantes – Promessas de Amor	Górgona Meyer (Gór)
2011	Vidas em Jogo	Rita Duarte Monteiro
2012	Balacobaco)	Betina Pontes
2014	Milagres de Jesus	Zilá (Episode: "O Endemoniado de Gerasa")
2015	Totalmente Demais	Maria Luisa (Lu)
2016	Super Chef Celebridade	Herself

=== Film ===
Year	Title	Role
2009	Divã	Juju
2009	Relações Virtuais	Paulie
2010	Novas Mídias	
2011	5 Calls	
2014	Ninguém Ama Ninguém... Por Mais de Dois Anos	Terezinha Seixas
2015	Take 1	Karen
