= Ariela Massotti =

Brazilian actress (born 1985)

- Born: Ariela Massotti; April 7, 1985 (age 41); Três Passos, Brazil
- Occupation: Actress
- Years active: 2005–present

Ariela Massotti (born April 7, 1985) is a Brazilian actress. She played the lead role in two telenovelas.

== Biography ==
After concluding high school, the then 17-year-old Massotti left her home city of Três Passos, Rio Grande do Sul to work as a model in São Paulo. However, as she was not successful, Ariela Massotti decided to study performing arts to become an actress.

When she was 19-years-old, Ariela Massotti studied at Wolf Maya's drama school. Soon after that, she was hired by Rede Globo after an acting evaluation, permanently moving to Rio de Janeiro. She commented that "Just after I finished the acting classes I got a role in Bang Bang". She played the naïve Brenda Lee. After Bang Bang, she guest starred in Malhação and then was hired by Rede Record to play the lead role in the telenovela Alta Estação. Ariela Massotti returned to Rede Globo in 2008 to play the lead role Otávia Prado in the telenovela Ciranda de Pedra, who tries to steal her sister's boyfriend. She guest starred in the comedy series Zorra Total in 2010, and played the lead antagonist in Malhação during the 2010–2011 season.

== Filmography ==
Television
| Year | Title | Role | Notes |
|---|---|---|---|
| 2005 | Bang Bang | Brenda Lee | Main cast |
| 2006 | Malhação | Clarinha | Guest star |
| 2006 | Alta Estação | Bárbara Carvalho | Lead role |
| 2008 | Ciranda de Pedra | Otávia Prado | Lead role |
| 2009 | Caminho das Índias | Leinha's friend | Guest star |
| 2010 | Zorra Total | Fairy Godmother | Guest star |
| 2010–2011 | Malhação | Raquel | Lead antagonist |
| 2015 | Os Dez Mandamentos | Miriam (second phase) | Main cast |
| 2015 | Malhação | | Guest star |
