= Leonardo Vieira =

Brazilian actor (born 1968)

- Born: Leonardo de Pinho Vieira; December 28, 1968 (age 56); Rio de Janeiro, Brazil
- Occupation: Actor

Leonardo Vieira (Rio de Janeiro, December 28, 1968) is a Brazilian actor. He is best known for his roles in telenovelas, especially Senhora do Destino, Prova de Amor and Caminhos do Coração.

He is openly gay.
