= Oswaldo Montenegro =

Brazilian musician

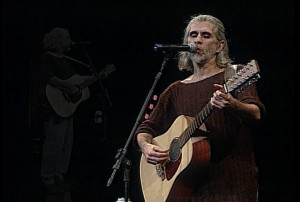
Oswaldo Montenegro

Oswaldo Viveiros Montenegro (Rio de Janeiro, March 15, 1956) is a Brazilian musician. In addition to being a singer, Montenegro has composed soundtracks for plays, ballets, film, and television and was married to actress Paloma Duarte. It has one of the stronger partnerships MPB beside Madalena Salles, accompanying with their flutes.

== Discography ==
- Sem Mandamentos (1975) Som Livre Compacto simple
- Trilhas (1977) Independente LP
- Poeta maldito... Moleque vadio (1979) WEA LP, CD
- Oswaldo Montenegro (1980) WEA LP, CD
- Asa de Luz (1981) WEA LP
- A Dança dos Signos (1983) Philips LP
- Cristal. Trilha sonora da peça (1983) PolyGram LP
- Brincando em cima daquilo (1984) LP
- Drops de Hortelã. Oswaldo Montenegro e Glória Pires (1985) PolyGram LP
- Os Menestréis (1986) Independente LP
- Aldeia dos Ventos (1987) Independente LP
- Oswaldo Montenegro ao vivo (1989) Som Livre LP, CD
- Oswaldo Montenegro (1990) Som Livre CD
- Vida de Artista (1991) Som Livre LP, CD
- Mulungo (1992) Som Livre CD
- Seu Francisco (1992) PolyGram CD
- Aos filhos dos hippies (1995) Albatroz CD
- O Vale Encantado (1997) Albatroz CD
- Noturno (1997) Independente CD
- Letras Brasileiras (1997) Albatroz CD Léo e Bia (1998) Albatroz CD
- Aldeia dos Ventos. Arte em construção (1998) Albatroz CD
- A Dança dos Signos 15 anos (1999) Independente CD
- Letras Brasileiras ao vivo (1999) Albatroz CD
- A lista (1999) Independente CD
- A lista. Trilha sonora do musical (1999) Independente CD
- A lista (1999) Independente single
- Letras brasileiras ao vivo (1999) Albatroz CD
- Escondido no tempo (1999) Panela Music CD
- Telas. Só para colecionadores (2000) Independente CD
- Entre uma balada e um blues (2001) Ouver Records CD
- A lista (2001) Jam Music CD
- Estrada nova (2002) Jam Music CD
- Letras brasileiras II (2003) Albatroz CD
- Aldeia dos ventos (2004) Jam Music CD
- Ao vivo - 25 anos (2004) Warner CD and DVD
- Léo e Bia 1973 (2005) Jam Music CD
- A partir de agora (2006) Wea CD and DVD
- Intimidade (2008) Som Livre CD and DVD
- Quebra-cabeça Elétrico (2009) DVD
- Canções De Amor (2010) CD
- De Passagem (2011)APE Music CD
- Ensaio (2013 - recorded in 1992) Warner DVD
- Oswaldo Montenegro e Cia Mulungo (2013) AMZ Midia CD and DVD
- Solidões (film soundtrack) (2013) OM Produções Artísticas - Download
- Me Ensina a Escrever (2014) OM Produções Artísticas - Single
- 3x4 (2015) DVD
- A Porta da Alegria (2015) OM Produções Artísticas - Single
- O Perfume da Memória (film soundtrack) (2016) OM Produções Artísticas - digital download
