= Jorge Pontual =

Brazilian sailor

Personal information
- Nationality: Brazilian
- Born: August 25, 1924
- Died: March 21, 2014 (aged 89)

Sport
- Sport: Sailing

Jorge Pontual (August 25, 1924 – March 21, 2014) was a Brazilian Olympic sailor in the Star class. He competed in the 1960 Summer Olympics together with Cid Nascimento, where they finished 9th. He was born in Rio de Janeiro, Brazil.
