= Angelina Muniz =

Brazilian model and actress (born 1955)

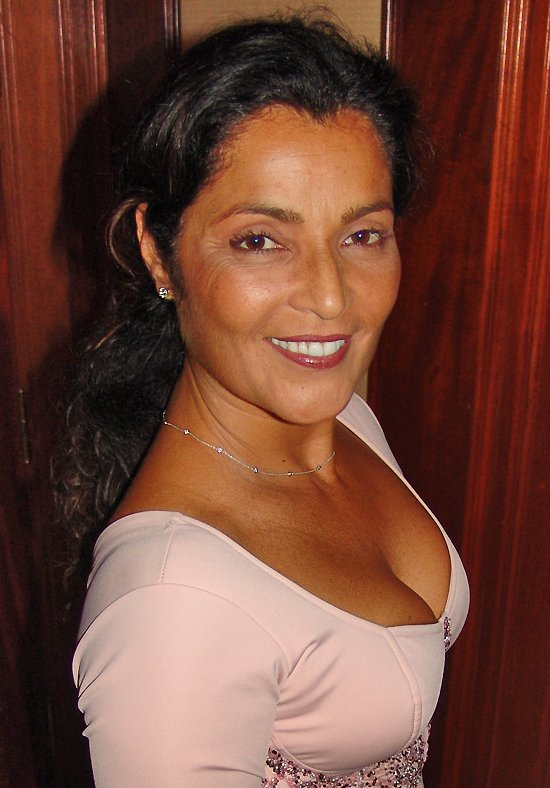
- Angelina in 2006
- Born: Angelina Maria Muniz Zagari; 21 March 1955 (age 71); Rio de Janeiro, Brazil
- Occupations: Model; actress

Angelina Maria Muniz Zagari (born 21 March 1955) is a Brazilian actress and former model. She became one of Brazil’s popular sex symbols in the late 1970s and early 1980s after appearing nude in several Brazilian films. Angelina also posed nude three times for the men's magazine Playboy.

== Biography ==
After graduating in law from a private university in Rio, Angelina then opted for a career in acting. In 1978 she took part in her first telenovela, Sinal de Alerta. She then made her film debut through Fim de Festa the same year. Despite getting good acclaim for her the subsequent film Nos Embalos de Ipanema, Angelina focused on the small screen appearing in a large number of telenovelas, including Happy End, Feathers and Sequins. As an actress, she is best known for her role in The Mutants: Ways of the Heart (2008), O Direito de Nascer (2001) and Ways of the Heart (2007). Angelina has presented an MPB programme on the now-defunct Musical FM radio in São Paulo in the 1990s, her brief stint as a radio broadcaster.

== Personal life ==
Angelina's daughter Alone Muniz is also an actress.
