= Estrela-Guia =

2003 Brazilian telenovela

- Genre: Telenovela
- Created by: Ana Maria Moretzsohn
- Written by: Daisy Chaves; Izabel de Oliveira; Fernando Rebello; Patrícia Moretzsohn
- Directed by: Denise Saraceni; Carlos Araújo
- Starring: Sandy; Guilherme Fontes; Carolina Ferraz; Rodrigo Santoro; Thaís Fersoza; Rosamaria Murtinho; Lucinha Lins; Lilia Cabral
- Opening theme: "Imagine" by RPM
- Country of origin: Brazil
- Original language: Portuguese
- No. of seasons: 1
- No. of episodes: 83

Production
- Camera setup: Multi-camera
- Production company: Central Globo de Produção

Original release
- Network: Rede Globo
- Release: 12 March – 15 June 2001

Estrela-Guia is a Brazilian telenovela produced and broadcast by TV Globo. It premiered on 12 March 2001, replacing O Cravo e a Rosa, and ended on 15 June 2001, replaced by A Padroeira. The telenovela is written by Ana Maria Moretzsohn, with the collaboration of Daisy Chaves, Izabel de Oliveira, Fernando Rebello, and Patrícia Moretzsohn.

The telenovela includes the themes of the hippie world, astrology, esotericism and urban life. Estrela-Guia tells the story of Cristal, whose astrological cards show that her destiny is linked to that of Tony, her godfather.

It stars Sandy, Guilherme Fontes, Carolina Ferraz, Rodrigo Santoro, Thaís Fersoza, Rosamaria Murtinho, Lucinha Lins, and Lilia Cabral.

== Plot ==
In the 1980s, hippie Bob (Marcos Winter) leaves his life in Rio de Janeiro to marry Catherine (Maitê Proença), an American he met during a trip to California. They establish the alternative community, Arco da Aliança, in the interior of Goiás and adopt the names of Hanuman and Kalinda. They have a daughter, Cristal (Sandy), whose godfather is workaholic Tony (Guilherme Fontes), Bob's former co-worker. Years later, Cristal is something of a leader in Arco da Aliança, but has to deal with the unexpected death of her parents in a mysterious fire. As a minor, she must move in to her godfather's house in Rio de Janeiro. In addition to the difficulties of adjusting to the city, Cristal finds herself in love with her godfather, who struggles with his feelings for his goddaughter as immoral.

== Cast ==
- Sandy as Cristal Hanumam
- Guilherme Fontes as Luís Antônio "Tony" Salles
- Carolina Ferraz as Vanessa Rios
- Rodrigo Santoro as Carlos Charles Pimenta
- Thaís Fersoza as Gisela Rios
- Rosamaria Murtinho as Carlota Salles
- Lucinha Lins as Lucrécia Espíndola
- Lília Cabral as Daphne "Daf" Pimenta
- Sérgio Mamberti as Alaor Pimenta
- Floriano Peixoto as Inácio
- Thiago Fragoso as Bernardo Lima
- Sergio Marone as Santiago / Fernando Ribeiro
- Fernanda Rodrigues as Sukhi Sukham
- Junior Lima as José Carlos "Zeca" Oliveira
- Christine Fernandes as Lara Gouveia "Lalá"
- Gabriel Braga Nunes as Guilherme Nunes
- Nelson Xavier as Purunam Sukham
- Mônica Torres as Su-Sukham
- Tarcísio Filho as Mauro Lima
- Graziella Moretto as Heloísa Castro Lima
- Isabela Garcia as Luciana Teixeira
- Evandro Mesquita as André Teixeira
- Nizo Neto as Elesbão Cruz
- Ana Carbatti as Dominique Cruz
- Maurício Gonçalves as Michael Brooks
- Irving São Paulo as Humberto
- Oberdan Júnior as Rafael Curi
- Marcelo Freitas as Diogo
- Alexandre Barbalho as Felício
- Maria Pompeu as Nenzinha
- Cida Moreyra as Castorina dos Santos
- Flávia Bonato as Maria Aparecida "Cida" Barreto
- Miguel Magno as Romeu
- Jorge Botelho as Rogê
- Lucy Mafra as Tânia
- Thiago de Los Reyes as João Lima
- Natália Barreto as Priscila Lima
- Renata Bravin as Maria Teixeira
- Netinho Alves as Daniel Salles

=== Guest stars ===
- Maitê Proença as Catherine McAdams / Kalinda Hanumam
- Marcos Winter as Paulo Roberto "Bob" Macedo / Orvale Hanumam
- Cláudia Ohana as Glorinha
- Marcos Pasquim as Edmilson
- Daniele Suzuki as Bianca
- Ana Beatriz Nogueira as Esperança
- Narcisa Tamborindeguy as herself

== Production ==
In 2000, TV Globo decided to try a telenovela for a younger audience in the 6 p.m. timeslot, which until then had been occupied by period dramas or contemporary dramas of a more serious nature, the reason being to retain the young viewers that stopped watching the network after the end of Malhação, a teen soap opera that aired before the 6 p.m. telenovela. At the time, Walcyr Carrasco was already writing the next telenovela for the timeslot, A Padroeira, which would debut in June 2001, with Ana Maria Moretzsohn having to write a plot of only three months, not having the option of extending the telenovela, both because of Sandy's busy schedule in music, and the ongoing production of the next telenovela. Due to the good reception with the audience, other telenovelas aimed at a young audience were later produced, such as Coração de Estudante and Agora É que São Elas.

According to Ana Maria Moretzsohn, the telenovela was written specifically for Sandy to play the lead role, since she wanted the singer to present a different image than the comedic one she portrayed in the Sandy & Junior television series. To bring the character Cristal to life, Sandy learned to chant mantras and also had to slow down the rhythm of her speech and breathing.

== Reception ==
=== Ratings ===
Season	Episodes	First aired		Last aired		Avg. viewers (points)
Season	Episodes	Date	Viewers (points)	Date	Viewers (points)	Avg. viewers (points)
1	83	12 March 2001	37	15 June 2001	31	30.9

== Soundtrack ==
Estrela-Guia

Soundtrack album by Various artists
- Released: 2001
- Length: 1:10:47
- Label: Som Livre

Estrela-Guia is the soundtrack of the telenovela, released in 2001 by Som Livre.

No.	Title	Artist(s)	Length
1.	"Imagine"	Paulo Ricardo Nery	4:04
2.	"Por Um Triz"	Lulo Scroback	3:39
3.	"Just The Way You Are"	Barry White	4:07
4.	"Cristal"	Ithamara Koorax	3:45
5.	"Enrosca"	Sandy & Junior	3:06
6.	"Oye Como Va"	Santana	4:16
7.	"Quase Nada"	Zeca Baleiro	3:54
8.	"Rebelião"	Skank	4:54
9.	"Um Girassol da Cor do Seu Cabelo"	Claudia Ohana	5:00
10.	"Father and Son"	Cat Stevens	3:36
11.	"Pout-Pourri: Bailão de Peão / Na Aba do Meu Chapéu"	Chitãozinho & Xororó	3:50
12.	"Vieste"	Lenine	4:08
13.	"Vâmo Embolando"	Banda Beijo	3:42
14.	"Lá Em Mauá"	P. O. Box	3:54
15.	"Amor de Índio"	Roupa Nova	3:49
16.	"Retiens La Nuit"	Johnny Hallyday	2:53
17.	"Vem Para Mim (Run to Me)"	6L6	3:50
18.	"Como Nossos Pais"	Elis Regina	4:20
Total length:			1:10:47
