= Mariana Molina =

Brazilian actress (born 1990)

- Born: Mariana Nunes de Souza Molina; October 5, 1990 (age 35); São Bernardo do Campo, São Paulo, Brazil
- Occupations: Actress, model
- Years active: 2001–present
- Height: 1.75 m (5 ft 9 in)

Mariana Nunes de Souza Molina (born October 5, 1990) is a Brazilian actress who has participated in several telenovelas.

== Biography ==
Molina has two siblings: the younger one is named Henrique, while her older sister is named Carol. Her interest for the artistic career started when she was nine years-old, after she asked her mother to join a child actors agency. During this time she also started appearing in ads and working as a child model.

== Career ==
She played Creuza Maria in the 2001 telenovela Pícara Sonhadora. Mariana Molina won the Caça-Patrulheiro contest in 2002. She beat more than 12 thousand people and in the end she was chosen to host the Nickelodeon's television show. The actress played the main antagonist of Malhação in 2009. Her character, named Bia, was an impulsive teenager, who loved the main character, Bernardo (played by Fiuk) and tried to push him away from Cristiana (Cristiana Peres). The villain joined an alliance with Tati (Élida Muniz), who was a friend and a rival and was also in love with Bernardo. Together they tried to separate the main couple. She played to play Cris in the 2012 Rede Globo telenovela Amor Eterno Amor, her character is a friend of both Tati (Adelaide de Castro) and Gabi (Olívia Torres), and is the daughter of Beatriz Mainardi (Carolina Kasting) and the sister of João (Luis Augusto Formal). The character is very close to her father, and suffers because of the parents divorce. Her character has a platonic love for Kléber (Marcelo Faria). Mariana Molina played the high school student Patrícia in the 2015 Rede Globo telenovela Verdades Secretas.

== Filmography ==
=== Television ===
Year	Title	Role	Notes	Ref
2001	Pícara Sonhadora	Creuza Maria		
2002	Patrulha Nick		Host	
2009	Malhação Identidade	Beatriz Gomes	Lead antagonist	
2011	Natália	Diana		
2012	Amor Eterno Amor	Cris		
2015	Milagres de Jesus	Noemi		
2015	Verdades Secretas	Patrícia		
2019	Bom Sucesso	Evelyn		
2024	Benefits with Friends	Marina Lélis	Guest star	
2025	Beleza Fatal	Mariana		
