= A Lei e o Crime =

- Genre: Drama; Action; Police procedural
- Created by: Marcílio Moraes
- Directed by: Alexandre Avancini Hamsa Wood
- Starring: Ângelo Paes Leme; Francisca Queiroz; Heitor Martinez; Caio Junqueira; Raquel Nunes; Silvio Guindane; Eduardo Lago
- Opening theme: Sangue Frio (Libra)
- Composer: Daniel Figueiredo
- Country of origin: Brazil
- Original language: Portuguese
- No. of seasons: 1
- No. of episodes: 23

Production
- Executive producer: Vicente Savelli
- Production location: Rio de Janeiro, Brazil
- Cinematography: Ricardo Fujii
- Running time: approx. 60 min.

Original release
- Network: Rede Record
- Release: January 9 – June 8, 2009

A Lei e o Crime (Portuguese for The Law and the Crime) is a Brazilian serial dramatic television series, created by Marcílio Moraes, produced and broadcast by Rede Record, which premiered on January 9, 2009. The series revolves around a low-class worker turned into drugdealer and a noble-blood woman turned into a police captain, who seeks for justice and revenge of her father's death.

It is directed by Alexandre Avancini and written by Marcílio Moraes, Joaquim Assis, René Belmonte, Leonardo Gudel, Sylvia Palma, Eduardo Quental and Irene Bosísio.

Since its premiere, A Lei e o Crime has achieved unexpectedly high audience ratings, with a 20-point average in São Paulo, and constantly leading the ratings in Rio de Janeiro, taking off rival Rede Globo's usual number-one spot. It was a hit show that helped bring Brazilian television to an international audience, and called "fantastic" by an Australian reviewer. The show has also been acclaimed by critics for its realism.

== Cast ==
- Francisca Queiroz as Catarina Laclos
- Ângelo Paes Leme as Nando "Nandinho da Bazuca"
- Raquel Nunes as Olímpia
- Heitor Martinez as Leandro
- Caio Junqueira as Romero
- Gabriela Durlo as Rosa
- Valquíria Ribeiro as Maria Joana
- Rogério Britto as Araújo
- Aline Borges as Gislaine "Lacraia"
- André Ramiro as Tião Meleca
- Sílvio Guindane as Valdo
- Felipe Martins as André
- Daniel Andrade as Orlando
- Adriana Prado as Josefa
- Juliana Teixeira as Margarida
- Eduardo Lago as Renato
- Tião D'Ávila
- Kito Junqueira as Ari
- Chico Expedito as Cícero
- Luiz Carlos de Moraes as Izaque
- Cristina Pereira as Jussara
- Léa Garcia as Clara
- Marília Barbosa as Luísa
- Rodrigo Costa as Celso
- Giullia Buscaio as Patrícia
- Larissa Henrique as Sandrinha
- Marcílio Moraes as escritor
- Roberto Frota as Reinaldo
- Nildo Parente as Alcebíades de Souza
- Jonas Bloch as Dep. Feitosa
- Cláudio Gabriel as Anderson
- Marcelo Escorel as Juvenal
- Marcela Moura as Laura
- Sérgio Henrique as Chulé
- Paulo Carvalho as Belisário
- Jonathan Nogueira as Edson
- Natália Guimarães as Gisele
- Vanessa Gerbelli
