= Máscaras =

- Created by: Lauro César Muniz
- Directed by: Ignácio Coqueiro; Edgard Miranda
- Starring: Fernando Pavão; Paloma Duarte; Miriam Freeland; Giselle Itié; Heitor Martinez; Petrônio Gontijo
- Opening theme: Porto Solidão by Fagner
- Country of origin: Brazil
- Original language: Portuguese
- No. of episodes: 125

Production
- Production location: Brazil
- Running time: 60 minutes (approx.)

Original release
- Network: RecordTV
- Release: April 10 – October 2, 2012

Máscaras (English: Masks) is a Brazilian telenovela produced and broadcast by RecordTV. Created by Lauro César Muniz. It premiered on April 4, 2012 and ended on October 2, 2012.

== Plot ==
Otávio is a thriving cattle breeder in Mato Grosso do Sul. And he falls in love with Maria, a young woman from the big city. The two marry, Maria will live on the farm next to her husband, have a baby and then suffer postpartum depression. To be treated, she embarks on a therapeutic ship, created by the alternative doctor Dr. Décio. Maria returns to her husband's farm, but is kidnapped along with her son, Tavinho. Otávio decides to start life with another identity, but he does not go to great lengths to find the family. He discovers that the kidnapping has to do with a criminal organization led by Big Blond, and goes on to investigate the crime. Only time passes and, without enduring the weight of the disappearance of his loved ones, the farmer goes into depression. Dr. Decio then receives an anonymous email saying that they will both find news of Maria inside a mysterious ship. His brother-in-law, Martim, connected to Big Blond, also embarks on the same cruise and insists on accusing Otavio of his sister's disappearance. The transatlantic berths in Búzios and Martim meets with members of the Organization. Suspicious, Otávio and Décio follow the trickster and end up kidnapped. At sea, Martim ends up dying and the farmer adopts his identity to restart his life. There begins a game of mirrors, in which the hero wears the mask of the villain and the villain pretends to be a hero.

== Cast ==
Actor/Actress	Character
Miriam Freeland	Maria Benaro
Paloma Duarte	Luiza (Nameless, Eliza Rainha, Liz)
Giselle Itié	Manuella Marim (Manu)
Fernando Pavão	Otávio Benaro (Martim Salles)
Heitor Martinez	Martim Salles (Otávio Benaro)
Petrônio Gontijo	Dr. Décio Navarro
Luíza Tomé	Geraldine Aidan
Jonas Bloch	Big Blond (Gastão)
Cecil Thiré	Eduardo Sotero
Jussara Freire	Elvira Duval
Raul Gazolla	Evaldo Fael
Bete Coelho	Valéria Lage
Francisca Queiroz	Flávia Mattos
Franciely Freduzeski	Cláudia Prado
Luiza Curvo	Laís Neves
Dado Dolabella	Eduardo Sotero Filho (Edu)
Nicola Siri	Caio Anselmi
Roberto Bomtempo	José Maria (Zezé)
Íris Bruzzi	Olívia Motta
Márcio Kieling	Gabriel Peixoto
Daniela Galli	Tônia Valdez Brown
Karen Junqueira	Luma Valdez
Gabriela Durlo	Marina Peixoto
Bárbara Bruno	Maria José (Zezé)
Flávia Monteiro	Eneida Bastos
Jorge Pontual	Mário Souza
Louise D'Tuani	Letícia Fael
Giuseppe Oristânio	Pulga
Eliete Cigarini	Nair Fael
Carlos Bonow	Fausto (Faustino)
Jean Fercondini	Marco Antônio Fael
Bemvindo Sequeira	Novais
Lívia Rossy	Yara Lemos
Marcelo Escorel	Toga (João)
Nanda Andrade	Soraia
Emilio Dantas	Gino
Augusto Zacchi	Régis
Renato Liveira	Jairo Neves
Valquíria Ribeiro	Maria do Socorro
Júlia Maggessi	Luciana Anselmi
Rai Antunes	Marcelo
Luli Miller	Mirella
Tatsu Carvalho	Rogério Mattos
Marcio Navarro	Funcionário do Décio Navarro
Karla Ralin	Luzia
Umberto Magnani	Jeremias

== Soundtrack ==
1. Porto Solidão - Fagner
2. Irmãos Da Lua - Renato Teixeira
3. Palavras Certas - Ju 87
4. Parou O Meu Mundo - Massau
5. Difícil - Franco Levine
6. Feito Pra Você - Celso Fonseca
7. Speed Racer - Fernanda Abreu
8. Sopra - Banda Vitória Régia
9. Tá No Meu Coração - Bruna e Mateus
10. Le Masque - Julio Cesar
11. You (Nuca Soube) - Claudia Albuquerque
12. Eu Preciso De Você - Rosemary
13. Blue Moon - Dave Gordon
14. To Fix A Broken Heart - Erikka
15. Serenata - Claudio Erlan
16. Mário O Sedutor - Keco Brandão

== Ratings ==
Timeslot (BRT/AMT)	Episodes	First aired		Last aired	
Timeslot (BRT/AMT)	Episodes	Date	Viewers (in points)	Date	Viewers (in points)
Mon–Fri 10:15pm	125	April 10, 2012	15	October 2, 2012	6
