= Lu Grimaldi =

Brazilian actress

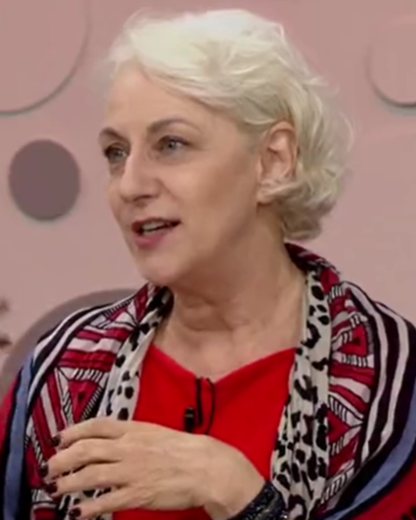
- Grimaldi in 2015
- Born: Maria Luísa Tis; 20 June 1954 (age 72); São Paulo, SP
- Occupation: Actress
- Years active: 1973–present
- Spouse(s): Roberto Gregório (divorced); Roberto Grimaldi (divorced)
- Children: 1

Maria Luisa Tisi (20 June 1954 in São Paulo) better known as Lu Grimaldi, is a Brazilian actress, known for her work on Apocalipse (2017), Rock Story (2017), for her portrayal of Maria I of Portugal in Liberdade, Liberdade (2016) and Ambitious Women (2015).

== Filmography ==
=== Television ===
Year	Title	Character	Note
1988	Vale Tudo	Clarice	
1990	Riacho Doce	Luciana	
1991	A História de Ana Raio e Zé Trovão	Clarice	
1994	As Pupilas do Senhor Reitor	Elvira Marques dos Santos	
1996	Xica da Silva	Fausta	
1998	Pérola Negra	Jane	episode: "9 de novembro"
1998	Meu Pé de Laranja Lima	Ana Maria Frazão (Don'ana)	
1999	Terra Nostra	Leonora Migliavacca	
2001	A Padroeira	Joaquina Soares Cabral Mendonça	
2002	Malhação	Íris Miranda	Season 9
2004	Um Só Coração	Frida Schmidt da Silva	
2004	Seus Olhos	Dirce	
2004	Branca de Neve e os Sete Peões	Bruxa Amanda	Special
2005	Sítio do Picapau Amarelo	Marcela	Season 5
2006	Sinhá Moça	Inês Garcia Fontes	
2007	Amigas & Rivais	Yolanda Montini	
2009	Poder Paralelo	Mamma Freda Castellamare	
2011	Sansão e Dalila	Zilá	
2012	Balacobaco	Lígia Sampaio Botelho	
2014	Milagres de Jesus	Yoná	episode: "Os Dez Leproso"
2014	Histórias de Verão	Solange	Especial de fim de ano
2015	Babilônia	Olga Loureiro Teixeira	
2016	Liberdade, Liberdade	Maria I de Portugal	episode: "11 de abril"
2017	Rock Story	Glória Braga	episodes: "23–29 de maio"
2017	Filhos da Pátria	Lady Grantham	episode: "Um Munífico Convite"
2017	Apocalipse	Laodiceia Pascolli (Laodi)	
2019	Detetives do Prédio Azul	Rita Eleganchic	episode: "Hotel Sem Estrelas"
2021	Nos Tempos do Imperador	Lurdes	
2023	A Infância de Romeu e Julieta	Clara Bernardi Campos	
