= Umberto Magnani =

Brazilian actor and theater producer

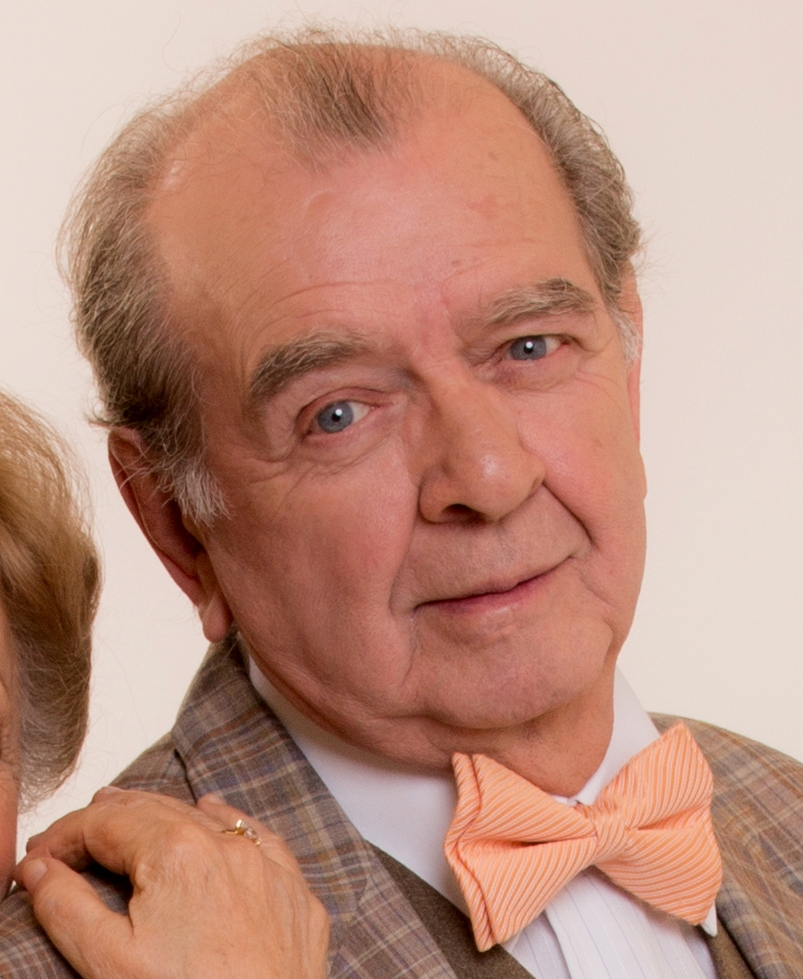
- Magnani in the play Elza e Fred, 2014
- Born: Umberto Magnani Netto; April 25, 1941; Santa Cruz do Rio Pardo, São Paulo, Brazil
- Died: April 27, 2016 (aged 75); Rio de Janeiro, Rio de Janeiro, Brazil
- Citizenship: Brazilian
- Occupations: Actor, producer
- Years active: 1965–2016
- Spouse: Cecília Maciel Magnani (m. 1970–2016)
- Awards: Troféu Mambembe for Best Actor (1981, Lua de Cetim; 1988, Às Margens do Ipiranga); Prêmio Molière for Best Actor (1981, Lua de Cetim); Prêmio Governador do Estado for Best Actor (1988, Às Margens do Ipiranga; 1989, Nossa Cidade)

Umberto Magnani Netto (April 25, 1941 – April 27, 2016) was a Brazilian actor and producer. He had an extensive career in Brazilian theater, television, and cinema.

== Biography ==
=== Early years and education ===
Of Italian descent, he was born in Santa Cruz do Rio Pardo, a city located in the interior of the state of São Paulo, son of a tailor. He made his stage debut at the age of three, when he played Jesus Christ at a children's school in Santa Cruz. At the local radio station, he started working on a children's program at the age of 13, where he joined to cover the costs of his cigarettes.

At the local radio station in his town, he developed a taste for the profession and decided to become an actor. He moved to São Paulo city, where he studied at the School of Dramatic Arts, University of São Paulo (EAD), affiliated with the University of São Paulo (USP), graduating in performing arts. Due to the marginalization of the profession, he told his parents that he would study engineering. During his undergraduate years, he worked at a car dealership.

=== Career ===
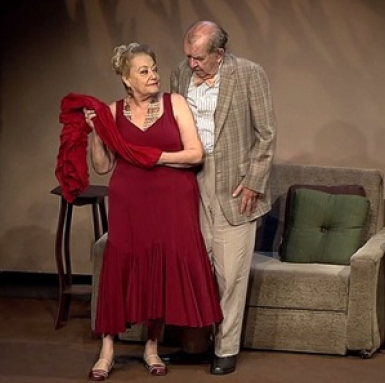
Magnani performing with Suely Franco in the play Elza & Fred in 2014.

In his debut year,1965, he acted in the play A Falecida, written by Nelson Rodrigues and directed by Antunes Filho, which was staged at the Leopoldo Fróes Theater in Santo Amaro, a district of São Paulo. In 1968, he joined the Teatro de Arena theater company, replacing Antônio Fagundes in Lauro César Muniz's play Primeira Feira Paulista de Opinião. In the same year, he made his television debut in Legião dos Esquecidos, broadcast by TV Excelsior, where he played a missionary priest.

He performed in the plays Frank V (1973) and Concerto nº 1 para Piano e Orquestra (1976) and stood out as an actor in 1977 in O Santo Inquérito, by Dias Gomes. His first stage production was the play Palhaços, in 1971. In many of his shows as a performer, he also acted as a producer. This was the case in Mocinhos Bandidos (1979), Lua de Cetim (1981), Cabeça e Corpo (1983), Louco Circo do Desejo (1986) and O Jogo (1994). In 1996, alongside his son, Beto Magnani, Umberto acted in the show Avesso.

On television in 1973, playing the character Zé Luis in the first version of the soap opera Mulheres de Areia, on the now defunct TV Tupi. In 1976, he made his film debut playing a teacher in the movie Chão Bruto, directed by Dionísio Azevedo.

In the 1980s, he starred in miniseries on TV Globo such as Grande Sertão: Veredas and Anarquistas, Graças a Deus, as well as appearing in the soap opera Razão de Viver broadcast by SBT and the series Joana, broadcast by TV Manchete.

At Globo, he appeared in acclaimed soap operas such as Felicidade, História de Amor, Por Amor, Laços de Família, Mulheres Apaixonadas, Cabocla, Alma Gêmea, and Páginas da Vida, having a career in television drama with writer Manoel Carlos, with whom he worked on several projects. She also participated in miniseries on the network such as Presença de Anita and the series Sandy & Junior (1999).

In 2007, he left the station and moved to SBT, where he starred in the soap opera Amigas & Rivais. The following year, he moved to TV Record, where he worked on the soap operas Chamas da Vida, Ribeirão do Tempo, Máscaras, and Balacobaco. His last work at the station was on the acclaimed series Conselho Tutelar (2015).

After 10 years away from TV Globo, he returned to the Rio de Janeiro channel to work on the soap opera Velho Chico. During the filming of the soap opera, the actor fell ill and was taken to the hospital by Globo TV. Shortly thereafter, he suffered a stroke and was replaced by actor Carlos Vereza.

=== Sector activity ===
Umberto Magnani was highly active as an educator, administrator, and in political spheres related to the cultural sector. From 1972 to 1988, he served as director of the Association of Theater Producers of the State of São Paulo (APETESP).

Between 1977 and 1990, he was the regional director in São Paulo for the National Foundation for the Performing Arts (Fundacen), nowadays named Fundação Nacional de Artes (Funarte), under the Ministry of Culture. He served as an advisor for the validation of performing arts courses in the state of São Paulo, affiliated with the Ministry of Education (MEC).

From 1988 to 1989, he served on the board of directors of the Campinas Scenic Laboratory, under the Campinas City Hall. In addition, he served as Secretary of Culture and Tourism in Santa Cruz do Rio Pardo, São Paulo, from 2001 to 2002, during the administration of Adilson Donizeti Mira (PSDB).

== Workers ==
=== TV ===
Year	Ttile	Character	Notes	Ref.
2017	A Grande Viagem	Mário	Posthumous release	
2016	Velho Chico	Priest Romão		
2016	Conselho Tutelar	Juca	Episode: "Pequenas e Grandes Vitórias"	
2015	Milagres de Jesus	Timeu	Episode: "O Cego de Jericó"	
2012	Balacobaco	Genivaldo Aragão		
2012	Máscaras	Jeremias		
2010	Ribeirão do Tempo	Luis Ajuricaba		
2008	Chamas da Vida	Dionísio Cardoso de Oliveira		
2007	Amigas & Rivais	Pedro Gonçalves		
2006	Páginas da Vida	José Ribeiro (Zé)		
2005	Alma Gêmea	Elias		
2004	Cabocla	Chico Bento		
2003	Mulheres Apaixonadas	Argemiro Batista		
2001	Presença de Anita	Eugênio		
2000	Laços de Família	Eládio		
1999	Sandy & Junior	Otacílio		
1997	Por Amor	Antenor Andrade		
1996	História de Amor	Mauro Moretti		
1996	Você Decide	—N/a	Episode: "Dilema do Amor"	
1994	Éramos Seis	Alonso		
1993	Você Decide	Priest	Episode: "O Juramento"	
1991	Felicidade	Ataxerxes		
1991	Ilha das Bruxas	Geraldo Sem Medo		
1991	Floradas na Serra	Donato Veronese Pinho		
1990	Rosa dos Rumos	Olegário		
1986	Memórias de um Gigolô	Bezerra		
1985	Joana	Sérgio		
1985	Grande Sertão: Veredas	Borromeu		
1984	Anarquistas, Graças a Deus	Tio Guerrando		
1983	Razão de Viver	Bruno		
1983	Caso Verdade	—N/a	Episode: "A Vereadora"	
1982	Caso Verdade	Firmino	Episode: "O Homem do Disco Voador"	
1973	Mulheres de Areia	Zé Luis		
1973	Teatro 2	Benvindo	Episode: "Palhaços"	
1968	Legião dos Esquecidos	Padre missionário		

=== Cinema ===
Year	Title	Character	Notes	Ref.
2009	The Tenants	Dimas		
2005	Quanto Vale ou É por Quilo?	Figueiras		
2003	Cristina Quer Casar	—N/a		
2002	Morte	Amigo no velório	Curta-metragem	
2002	Rua 6, sem número	Dimas		
2000	Cronicamente Inviável	Alfredo		
1989	Kuarup	Fontoura		
1985	Hour of the Star	Seu Raimundo		
1985	Jogo Duro	—N/a		
1976	Chão Bruto	Teacher		

=== Theater ===
Year	Title	Character	Author	Director	Ref.
2014	Elza e Fred	Fred	Marcos Carnevale, Lily Ann Martín, and Marcela Geraghty.	Elias Andreato	
2007	Loucos por Amor		Sam Shepard	Francisco Medeiros	
1996–2000	Uma Vida no Teatro		David Mamet	Francisco Medeiros	
1996	Avesso		David Mamet	Francisco Medeiros	
1994	O Jogo	Didi	Reinaldo Maia	Reinaldo Maia	
1994	Tartufo	Orgon	Molière	José Rubens Siqueira	
1994	Fragmentos e Canções		Eduardo Tolentino de Araújo		
1993	A Guerra Santa	Virgílio	Luís Alberto de Abreu	Gabriel Villela	
1989	Nossa Cidade	Dr. Francisco	Thorton Wilder	Eduardo Tolentino de Araújo	
1989	Jesus Homem	Saint Peter	Plínio Marcos	Reinaldo Maia	
1988	Às Margens do Ipiranga	Leon	Fauzi Arap	Fauzi Arap	
1985	Louco Circo do Desejo		Consuelo de Castro	Vladimir Capella	
1984	Um Tiro no Coração	Samuel Wainer	Oswaldo Mendes	Plínio Rigon	
1983	Cabeça e Corpo	Samuel Krassik	Mauro Chaves	Silnei Siqueira	
1981	Lua de Cetim	Guima	Alcides Nogueira Pinto	Márcio Aurélio	
1980	Sérgio Cardoso em Prosa e Verso	Various characters		Gianni Ratto	
1979	Mocinhos Bandidos	Chicão, Gaúcho, Pai, Tatá	Fauzi Arap	Fauzi Arap	
1977	O Santo Inquérito	Augusto Coutinho	Dias Gomes	Flávio Rangel	
1976	Concerto nº 1 para Piano e Orquestra	Clóvis	João Ribeiro Chaves Neto	Sérgio Mamberti	
1975	Reveillon		Flávio Márcio	Paulo José	
1974	Um Homem Chamado Shakespeare	Various characters	William Shakespeare	Antonio Ghighonetto and Bárbara Heliodora	
1973	Frank V	Gaston Schmalz	F. Durremmat	Fernando Peixoto	
1973	O Carrasco do Sol		Peter Shaffer	Madalena Nicol	
1972	A Capital Federal		Arthur de Azevedo	Flávio Rangel	
1971	Palhaços	Bemvindo	Timochenco Wehbi	Emilio de Biasi	
1970	Cidade Assassinada	Diogo Soeiro	Antonio Callado	Diogo Soeiro	
1970	Macbeth	Lenox	William Shakespeare	Fauzi Arap	
1969	Morte e Vida Severina		João Cabral de Melo Neto	Silnei Siqueira	
1969	Língua Presa e Olho Vivo		Peter Shaffer	Emilio de Biasi	
1968	Primeira Feira Paulista de Opinião	Various characters	Lauro César Muniz, Bráulio Pedroso, Jorge Andrade, Gianfrancesco Guarnieri, Plínio Marcos, and Augusto Boal	Augusto Boal	
1968	A Sonata dos Espectros	Homelless	Strindberg	Alfredo Mesquita	
1968	Macbird	Edward Ken O’Dunk	Barbara Garson	Augusto Boal	
1968	Este Ovo É um Galo	Eurico	Lauro César Muniz	Silnei Siqueira	
1967	O Burguês Fidalgo	Mestre de Música e Covielle	Molière	Alfredo Mesquita	
1967	Paiol Velho	Tonico	Abílio Pereira de Almeida	Ruy Nogueira	
1967	Joana d'Arc Entre as Chamas		Paul Claudel	Claudio Lucchesi	
1966	O Veredicto	Lawyer	Mirian San Juan	Alfredo Mesquita	
1966	Somos Todos do Jardim da Infância	Edgard	Domingos de Oliveira	Silnei Siqueira	
1965	Auto da Alma	Diabo	Gil Vicente	Alfredo Mesquita	
1965	O Velho da Horta		Gil Vicente	Alfredo Mesquita	
1965	A Falecida		Nelson Rodrigues	Antunes Filho	
1965	Na Vila de Vitória		Joseph of Anchieta	Alfredo Mesquita	

== Prizes ==
Among the awards he received are the Troféu Mambembe and the Molière Prize for Best Actor in 1981 for his performance in the play Lua de Cetim. In 1988, he won the Troféu Mambembe and the Governor of the State of São Paulo Award for Best Actor in Às Margens do Ipiranga. He also received the Governor of the State of São Paulo Award for Best Actor in 1989 for the play Nossa Cidade.

== Personal life ==
He was married to actress Cecília Maciel Magnani and they had three children: Ana Júlia, Beto, and Graciana.

=== Death ===
Magnani suffered a stroke during the filming of Velho Chico on Rede Globo, on his 75th birthday. He was rushed to Vitória Hospital in Barra da Tijuca, in Rio de Janeiro, and underwent surgery. He fell into a deep coma and died two days later.

His body was laid in state in his hometown, Santa Cruz do Rio Pardo, where official mourning was also declared. In the city, there is an annual cultural exhibition in his honor.
