= Luigi Baricelli =

Brazilian actor (born 1971)

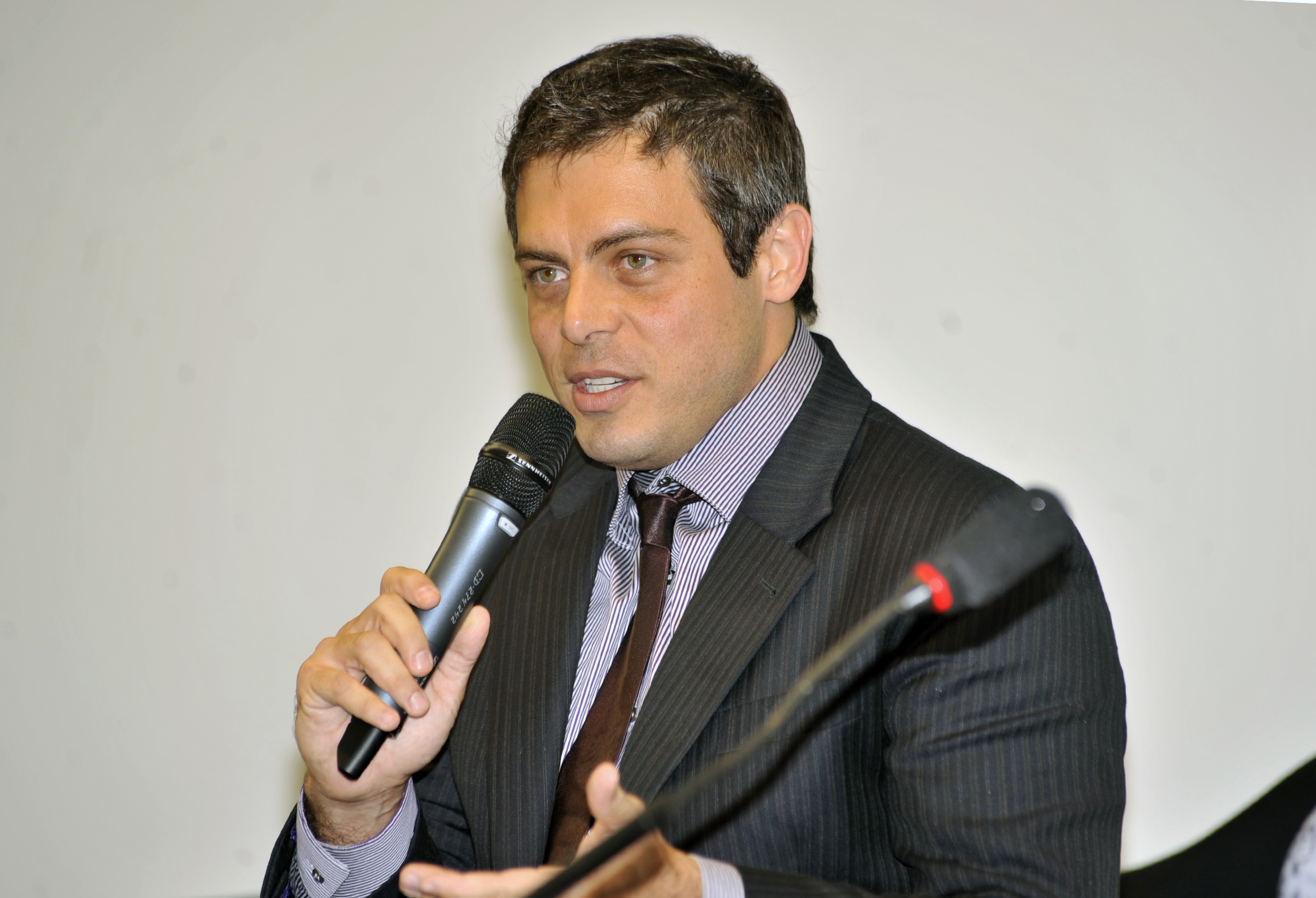
- The actor and television presenter Luigi Baricelli, participates in a hearing in the Parliamentary Commission of Inquiry.
- Born: Luiz Fernando Pecorari Baricelli; 14 July 1971 (age 54); São Paulo, SP
- Occupation: Actor • Presenter
- Years active: 1991–present
- Height: 1.78 m (5 ft 10 in)
- Website: https://www.luigibaricelli.com.br/

Luiz Fernando Pecorari Baricelli (São Paulo, 14 July 1971) is a Brazilian actor and presenter. He became known in 1991 as Dom Diogo in the extinct TV Manchete in the series O Guarani. On 24 April 1995 he was nationally known as Romão in the first, second, third and fifth seasons of Malhação (1995–1999). He played Fred in Laços de Família (2000) alongside Giovanna Antonelli. Over the years, he has played numerous characters such as Raul in Alma Gêmea (2005), Alexandre Paixão in Sabor da Paixão (2002), and Flávio in O Profeta (2006).

In 2008 he began his career as a presenter at his own skit on Domingão do Faustão, which ended in 2009. From 2009 to 2010 he presented Vídeo Show with André Marques. Baricelli made his last character at Globo as Oscar in Insensato Coração (2011).

In 2016 Baricelli left Rede Globo and worked on two reality shows, Escola Para Maridos (2016) by Fox and À Primeira Vista (2017) of Band.

== Filmography ==
=== Television ===
| Year | Title | Character / Position | Notes |
|---|---|---|---|
| 1991 | O Guarani | Diogo de Mariz | |
| 1992 | Deus Nos Acuda | José Paulo Pinheiro (Zelito) | |
| 1993 | Você Decide | Guilherme | Episódios: "Laços de Sangue" |
| 1994 | 74.5: Uma Onda no Ar | Rodolfo Rodrigues | |
| 1995–99 | Malhação | Romão Marques Macieira | Season 1–3; 5 |
| 1999 | Dartagnan e os Três Mosqueteiros | Lord de Winter | Especial de fim de ano |
| 2000 | Você Decide | Juliano | Episódio: "Ídolos de Barro" |
| 2000 | Laços de Família | Frederico Lacerda (Fred) | |
| 2001 | A Padroeira | Valentim Coimbra | |
| 2002 | Brava Gente | Eduardo Cantabrava | Episódio: "Palácio de Cristal" |
| 2002 | Sabor da Paixão | Alexandre Paixão | |
| 2003 | Sítio do Picapau Amarelo | Fera | Episódio "A Bela e a Fera" |
| 2004 | Um Só Coração | Walter Forster | |
| 2004 | Sob Nova Direção | Rubens | Episódio: "De Volta para o Presente e Se Colar, Colou" |
| 2004 | A Diarista | Ele Mesmo | Episódio: "Aquele do Projac" |
| 2004 | O Pequeno Alquimista | Zózimo Teixeira | |
| 2005 | Alma Gêmea | Raul de Carvalho Siqueira | |
| 2005 | A História de Rosa | Adalbertino Munhoz | Especial de fim de ano |
| 2006 | O Profeta | Flávio Leite | |
| 2006 | A Diarista | Guilherme | Episódio: "Garoto de Ipanema" |
| 2006 | Dom | Diogo Telles | Especial de fim de ano |
| 2008 | Dicas de um Sedutor | Ulisses Ferreira | Episódio: "Amor e Fantasia" |
| 2008 | Casos e Acasos | Edgar Antunes / Hugo Rocha | Episódio: "O Triângulo, a Tia Raquel e o Pedido" Episódio: "A Blitz, o Presente e os Filhos" |
| 2008–09 | Domingão do Faustão | Repórter | Quadro: Caminhão do Faustão |
| 2009–10 | Vídeo Show | ApresentadorO Guarani | |
| 2011 | Insensato Coração | Oscar Amaral | |
| 2011 | Aquele Beijo | Ele mesmo | Episódio: "8 de setembro de 2011" |
| 2014 | Os Homens São de Marte... | Domingos Sampaio | Episódio: "O Primeiro Beijo" Episódio: "Um Novo Começo" |
| 2016 | Escola para Maridos | Apresentador | |
| 2017 | À Primeira Vista | Apresentador | |

=== Cinema ===
| Year | Title | Character | Notes |
|---|---|---|---|
| 2000 | Xuxa Popstar | Ricardo Luz / Raio de Luz | |
| 2003 | Maria – Mãe do Filho de Deus | Jesus | |
| 2004 | A Cartomante | Camilo | |
| 2006 | The Wild | Benny | Dubbing |
| 2013 | Didi, o Peregrino | Santiago Maior | |
| 2015 | Que Geração É Essa? | Himself | Documentary |
