= Cronicamente Inviável =

2000 film by Sérgio Bianchi

- Directed by: Sergio Bianchi
- Screenplay by: Sergio Bianchi; Gustavo Steinberg
- Story by: Sergio Bianchi; Beatriz Bracher; João Emanuel Carneiro
- Produced by: Sergio Bianchi; Alvarina Souza e Silva
- Starring: Umberto Magnani; Cecil Thiré; Dira Paes; Betty Gofman
- Cinematography: Marcelo Coutinho; Antonio Penido
- Edited by: Paulo Sacramento
- Distributed by: Agravo Produções Cinematográficas
- Release date: August 10, 2000 (Switzerland)
- Running time: 101 minutes
- Country: Brazil
- Language: Portuguese

Cronicamente Inviável (English: Chronically Unfeasible) is a 2000 Brazilian film directed by Sérgio Bianchi.

== Cast ==
- Cecil Thiré as Luís
- Betty Gofman as Maria Alice
- Daniel Dantas as Carlos
- Dan Stulbach as Adam
- Umberto Magnani as Alfredo
- Dira Paes as Amanda
- Leonardo Vieira as Ceará
- Cosme dos Santos as Valdir
- Zezé Motta as Ada
- Zezeh Barbosa as Josilene
- Cláudia Mello as Motorista
- Rodrigo Santiago as Carioca
- Carmo Dalla Vecchia as himself
- João Acaiabe as Union Leader
- Patrick Alencar as Gabriel
- Roberto Bomtempo as Osvaldo, Josilene's boyfriend

== Awards ==
2000: Chicago International Film Festival

1. Best Feature (Nominee)

2001: Cinema Brazil Grand Prize

1. Best Picture (Nominee)

2001: São Paulo Association of Art Critics Awards

1. Best Film (won)
