= O Dono do Mar =

2006 film directed by Manuel Odorico Mendes

- Directed by: Odorico Mendes
- Starring: Jackson Costa; Regiane Alves; Daniela Escobar; Samara Felippo
- Release date: 2006
- Running time: 115 minutes
- Country: Brazil
- Language: Portuguese

O Dono do Mar is a Brazilian film of 2006.

== Synopsis ==
The owner of the Sea delves into the mythical world of the fishermen of Maranhão, through the life of Antão Cristório (Jackson Costa). Created in the hardness of the labors of the sea, this man of strong character loses a child Jerumenho still very young, murdered by the knife of a cuckolded husband, a party of Bumba-meu-boi. The unsurpassed loss of beloved son, prepared by his father from childhood, to succeed him at work in the field of fisheries and the secrets of the great sea of Antão Cristório takes forever the prospect of the future. The fisherman turns his back on tomorrow and facing the past, tells his story.
