= Amigas & Rivais =

- Genre: Telenovela; Drama; Romance
- Created by: Original Story: Emilio Larrosa; Adaptation for SBT: Letícia Dornelles
- Based on: Amigas y rivales by Emilio Larrosa
- Directed by: Henrique Martins; David Grimberg
- Starring: Lisandra Parede; Karla Tenório; Cacau Melo; Thaís Pacholeck; Daniel Ávila; Talita Castro; Jayme Periard; Thierry Figueira; Lu Grimaldi; Umberto Magnani; Mika Lins; Jandir Ferrari; Renato Scarpin; Flávio Guarnieri see more
- Opening theme: Na Guerra e Na Paz by Thaeme Mariôto, Shirley Carvalho and Lenny Bellard
- Country of origin: Brazil
- Original language: Portuguese
- No. of episodes: 140

Production
- Production location: Brazil
- Running time: 45 minutes

Original release
- Network: SBT
- Release: 6 August 2007 – 18 January 2008

Related
- Amigas y rivales (original series)

Amigas & Rivais (English: Friends and Rivals) is a Brazilian telenovela produced and broadcast by SBT from August 6, 2007 to January 18, 2008. It is a remake of the Mexican telenovela Amigas y rivales that produced by Televisa in 2001.

== Cast ==
Actor/Actress	Character
Lisandra Parede	Laura Lisboa Gonçalves / Laura Machado
Cacau Melo	Nicole Pereira
Karla Tenório	Olívia Villar Barreto
Thaís Pacholeck	Helena Delaor Martins
Talita Castro	Rosana Brito Delaor / Carolina Machado
Daniel Ávila	Roberto "Beto" Delaor Jr.
Jayme Periard	Roberto Delaor
Joaquim Lopes	Ulisses Barreto
Ana Paula Grande	Andréia Lisboa Gonçalves Coimbra
Flávia Pucci	Carlota Mendes
Tania Casttello	Alma Lisboa Gonçalves
Thierry Figueira	Raí Sugar Baby
Jandir Ferrari	Mocho dos Anjos/Jacarandá/Manoel Coimbra
Renata Ricchi	Mônica Rossi
Lu Grimaldi	Yolanda
Mika Lins	Mara Coimbra
Hermano Moreira	Germano Coimbra
Olivetti Herrera	Carlos Martins
Raoni Carneiro	Armando Tavares
Renato Scarpin	Padre Emiliano
Ana Olivia Seripieri	Maria Alves
Josmar Martins	Gardênia
Umberto Magnani	Pedro Gonçalves
Marcelo Szykman	Sheyla Shirley
Adriana Quadros	Patrícia Delaor
Suzana Alves	Alessandra Tavares
Beto Marden	Rodrigo
Jalusa Barcellos	Sônia Martins
Marcelo Galdino	Chacal
Hylka Maria	Ângela Moraes
Walter Cruz	Dr. Caetano
Flávio Guarnieri	Juca Ramos
Nara Gomez	Amanda Pereira
Juliana Mesquita	Georgina
Ana Fuser	Marilú
Reinaldo Ritts	Ricardo Lopes
Roberto Skudero	Stallone
Gilmar Guido	Miguel
Thiago Tenório	Frank
Bruno Lopes	Oscar
Marcus Ártico	Capanga do Circo
Pedro Paulo Rossa	Rafael Pereira
Adriana del Claro	Ana Paula
Kiko Nunes	Neco
