= Maurício Mattar =

Brazilian actor (born 1964)

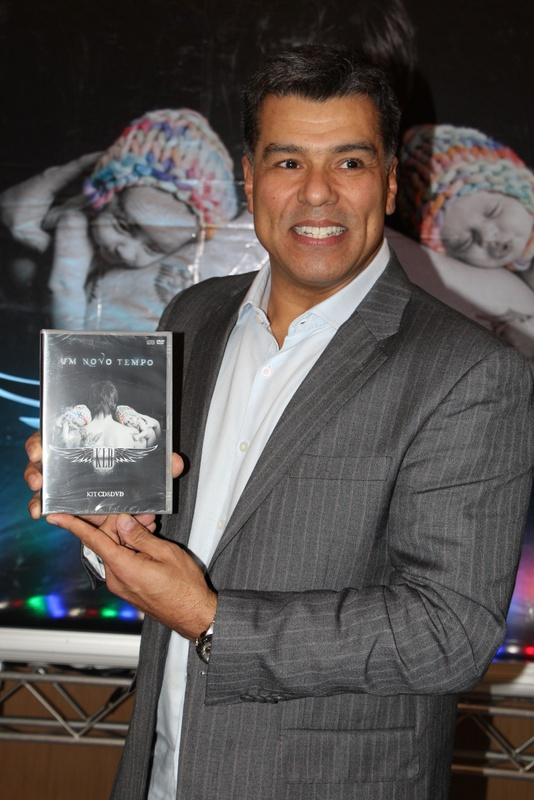
- Mattar, 2015
- Born: Maurício Mattar Kirk de Souza; 3 April 1964 (age 62); Rio de Janeiro, Brazil
- Occupation: Actor
- Years active: 1985-present
- Children: 4

Maurício Mattar (born 3 April 1964) is a Brazilian actor.

== Biography ==
Maurício Mattar was born in Rio de Janeiro, the son of Jarbas Mattar and Liedir Mattar. He is of Lebanese origin. Mattar is the nephew of the great pianist Pedro Mattar.

== Career ==
Mauricio Mattar participated in the film False Blond directed by Carlos Reichenbach. He is also a singer, having recorded some records and sung on the weekly television program "Domingão do Faustão" on the Rede Globo Brazilian network.

== Filmography ==
In the cinema

- False Blond - in final phase
- 1990 - The Cat of Extraterrestre Boots
- 1989 - Kuarup
- 1987 - Johnny Love
- 1986 - Said cinema (documentary)

In the television

- 2019 - Topíssima - Carlos Dominguez
- 2018 - Jesus - Joachim
- 2013 - Dona Xepa - Júlio César Pantaleão
- 2010 - S.O.S. Emergência - Vinícius
- 2010 - Na Forma da Lei
- 2008 - Casos e Acasos - Diego
- 2006/2007 - O Profeta - Henrique
- 2005 - A Lua Me Disse - Lúcio
- 2003/2004 - Agora É que São Elas - Pedro
- 2001/2002 - A Padroeira - Dom Fernão de Avelar
- 2001 - Sítio do Picapau Amarelo - Tupã
- 2001 - Porto dos Milagres - Frederico Vieira
- 1999 - Louca Paixão - André
- 1998 - Mulher - Carlos Corrêa Lopes
- 1996 - O Fim do Mundo - Lucas
- 1994 - A Viagem - Teodoro Dias (Téo) Encarnação de Alexandre Toledo ( Guilherme fontes)
- 1993/1994 - O Mapa da Mina - Bakur Shariff
- 1992/1993 - Pedra sobre Pedra - Leonardo
- 1990 - Lua Cheia de Amor - Augusto
- 1990 - Rainha da Sucata - Rafael
- 1989 - O Salvador da Pátria - Sérgio
- 1987 - Bambolê - Murilo
- 1986 - Cambalacho - Porthos
- 1985/1986 - Roque Santeiro - João Ligeiro

== Personal life ==
He had a relationship with the Brazilian actress Paola Oliveira.
