= Carmo Dalla Vecchia =

Brazilian actor (born 1971)

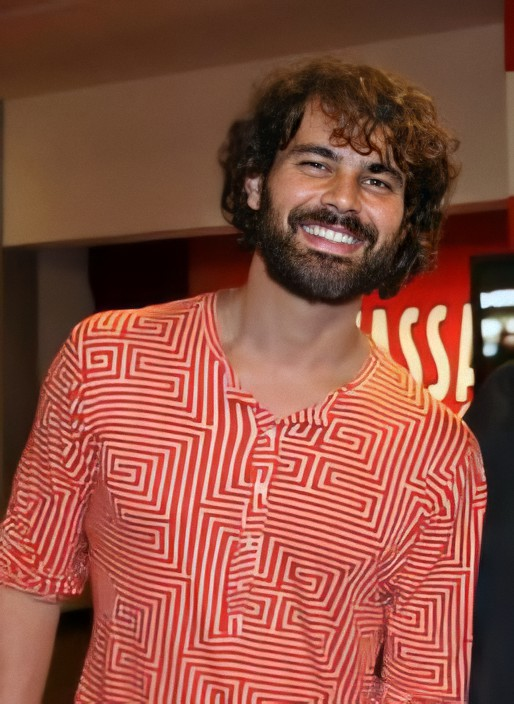
- Dalla Vecchia in 2011
- Born: 21 August 1971 (age 55); Carazinho, Rio Grande do Sul, Brazil
- Occupation: Actor
- Years active: 1994–present
- Spouse: João Emanuel Carneiro (m. 2006)
- Children: 1

Carmo Dalla Vecchia (born 21 August 1971) is a Brazilian actor.

== Biography ==
Carmo Dalla Vecchia was born in Carazinho, in the Brazilian state of Rio Grande do Sul. He is of Italian descent. He holds Italian citizenship through his grandparents.

== Filmography ==
Television
Year	Title	Role
1995	Engraçadinha... Seus Amores e Seus Pecados	Durval
1995–1996	Cara & Coroa	Fabinho
1996–1997	Perdidos de Amor	Dalton
1997–1998	Canoa do Bagre	João
1998	Serras Azuis	Silvaninho
1999	Você Decide	
2000	Chiquititas	Rian
2001	Pícara Sonhadora	Inácio
2003	A Casa das Sete Mulheres	Batista
2004	Seus Olhos	Sérgio
2004	Linha Direta Justiça	Alberto Jorge Bandeira
2004–2005	Começar de Novo	Tenório
2005	Sob Nova Direção	Aldo
2006	JK	Carlos Vasconcelos
2006	Cobras & Lagartos	Luciano Botelho / Martim
2006	Linha Direta Justiça	José Ramos
2007	Dança dos Famosos 4	Himself
2008–2009	A Favorita	Zé Bob
2009–2010	Cama de Gato	Alcino Rodrigues
2010	A Cura	José Silvério de Andrade
2011	Cordel Encantado	King Augusto Frederico III
2012	Amor Eterno Amor	Fernando Sobral
2013	Joia Rara	Manfred Ducke Lopes
2014	Império	Maurílio
2015	A Regra do Jogo	César
2018	Malhação	Rafael Porto
2019	Órfãos da Terra	Paul Abbas
2022	Cara e Coragem	Alfredo Laes
2023	Amor Perfeito	Érico Requião
2025	The Masked Singer Brasil	Vlad (from Vamp)
2026	A Nobreza do Amor	King Augusto Frederico III

Film
Year	Title	Role
2000	Cronicamente Inviável	
2008	Onde Andará Dulce Veiga?	Rauderio
