= O Profeta =

- Genre: Telenovela
- Based on: O Profeta by Ivani Ribeiro
- Developed by: Thelma Guedes; Duca Rachid
- Written by: Alessandro Marson; André Ryoki; Júlio Fischer; Thereza Falcão
- Directed by: Mário Márcio Bandarra
- Starring: Thiago Fragoso; Paola Oliveira; Dalton Vigh; Carol Castro; Fernanda Souza; Rodrigo Phavanello; Luís Gustavo; Vera Zimmermann; Maurício Mattar; Nívea Maria; Mauro Mendonça; Paula Burlamaqui; Rodrigo Faro; Fernanda Rodrigues; Juliana Didone; Daniel Ávila; Samara Felippo; Zezeh Barbosa
- Opening theme: "Além do Olhar"
- Composer: Ivo Pessoa
- Country of origin: Brazil
- Original language: Portuguese
- No. of episodes: 178

Production
- Running time: 45 minutes

Original release
- Network: TV Globo
- Release: October 16, 2006 – May 11, 2007

O Profeta (English: The Prophet) is a Brazilian telenovela produced and aired by TV Globo between October 16, 2006 and May 11, 2007. It is adapted by Thelma Guedes and Duca Rachid, based on the 1977 telenovela of the same name.

It stars Thiago Fragoso, Paola Oliveira, Fernanda Souza, Rodrigo Phavanello, Juliana Didone and Daniel Ávila, Dalton Vigh, Carol Castro, Samara Felippo, Nívea Maria, and Malvino Salvador.

== Plot ==
Marcos, from an early age, shows himself to be different from other people, which worries his parents. Gifted with a special gift, he foresees events, but cannot prevent them from happening. As an adult, he foresees, but is unable to prevent, the tragic death of his younger brother, Lucas, whom he protected and loved very much.

Tormented by guilt, Marcos leaves for São Paulo to live with his sister, Ester, and give his life a new direction. Soon after arriving in the city, he meets Sônia, a beautiful and honest girl who works in a crystal factory. In this casual but intense encounter, Marcos feels that she is the woman of his life.

However, Sonia is his cousin Camilo's girlfriend. In an attempt to forget her, Marcos gets involved with Ruth, a beautiful, frivolous and headstrong girl. He is also the target of admiration from Carola, Ruth's sister, an intelligent girl but with low self-esteem, who thinks she is fat and clumsy - the ugly duckling of her family.

Thus begins Marcos' begins the new phase of his life. During his journey, his gift will be used by others who see it as an opportunity for financial gain. However, Marcos must decide whether to follow this path or attempt to discover his purpose.

== Cast ==
- Thiago Fragoso as Marcos Oliveira
- Paolla Oliveira as Sônia Carvalho de Oliveira
- Carol Castro as Ruth Ribeiro de Sousa
- Dalton Vigh as Clóvis Moura
- Fernanda Souza as Carola Ribeiro de Sousa
- Nívea Maria as Maria Luísa "Lia" Ribeiro de Souza
- Malvino Salvador as Camilo de Oliveira
- Juliana Didone as Bárbara de Oliveira Nogueira "Baby"
- Daniel Ávila as Antônio "Tony" Ribeiro de Souza
- Rodrigo Phavanello as Arnaldo de Almeida Correa "Paspalho"
- Vera Zimmermann as Ester de Oliveira Nogueira
- Maurício Mattar as Henrique Nogueira
- Laura Cardoso as Abigail Gomes
- Mauro Mendonça as Francisco Gomes
- Samara Felippo as Wanda "Wandinha" Carvalho
- Fernanda Rodrigues as Gisele da Silva "Gigele"
- Rodrigo Faro as Carlos Zucrini Gonçalves "Tainha"
- Paula Burlamaqui as Teresa Ribeiro Guimarães Leite
- Luciana Braga as Sofia de Abranches Leite
- Luís Gustavo as Piragibe Carvalho
- Zezeh Barbosa as Deolinda "Dedê" Cardoso
- Juliana Baroni as Miriam Carvalho "Troféu"
- Nuno Leal Maia as Alceu Carvalho
- Rosi Campos as Rúbia da Silva/Madame Rúbia
- Arlete Montenegro as Filomena Moura Brandão
- Carolina Kasting as Laura Moura
- Rosina Lobosco as Joana
- Jandir Ferrari as Delegate Régis Moreira
- Mário Gomes as Ernesto da Silva
- Luigi Baricelli as Flávio Leite
- Ana Lúcia Torre as Hilda Vieira
- Neusa Maria Faro as Teodora Sanches
- Andréa Avancini as Edite Zucrini Gonçalves
- Hugo Gross as Jonas (Joílson/Joélson)
- Thiago Luciano as Paulo "Paulito" Gomes
- Armando Babaioff as Matheus Carvalho de Oliveira
- Vitória Pina as Natália Cardoso
- Caroline Smith as Ana Lúcia "Analu" Moura Alencar
- Luana Dandara as Margarida
- Simone Soares as Zélia Salvador
- José D'Artagnan Jr as Gilberto Eiras
- Renato Rabello as Genésio
- Genézio de Barros as Priest Olavo Oliveira
- Júlia Ruiz as Marília
- Júlia Matos as Rosa
- Orã Figueiredo as Renato Salvador
- Renan Ribeiro as Benjamin
- Guilherme Vieira as Zeca
- Caroline Molinari as Júlia
- Licurgo Spínola as Dr. Michel Garambone
- Cris Vianna as Professora Gilda
- Marcela Monteiro as Dóris
- Luca de Castro as Tarcísio Gomes
- Rogério Falabella as Dr. Diógenes Fonseca
- Gabriel Canella as Isaías

=== Guest stars ===
- Gisele Itié as Sabine Levy
- Henrique Ramiro as Lucas Oliveira
- Simone Spoladore as Luci Carvalho
- Débora Olivieri as Julieta
- Edward Boggis as Pelópidas
- Renata Castro Barbosa as Cida
- Sérgio Mamberti as Marcos' spiritual guide
- Castro Gonzaga as Dr. Klaus Becker
- Mônica Torres as Marisa Monettia
- Tarciana Saad as Rebeca
- Wagner Molina as Raj Ahad
- Nicette Bruno as Dona Cleide
- Vera Holtz as Ana de Oliveira
- Stênio Garcia as Jacó de Oliveira
- Gabriel Moura as Child Marcos
- Beatriz Lyra as Mother Superior
