= Dança dos Famosos season 5 =

Dança dos Famosos
- Season 5
- Celebrity winner: Christiane Torloni
- Professional winner: Álvaro Reis
- No. of episodes: 11

Release
- Original network: Rede Globo
- Original release: February 24 – May 11, 2008

Season chronology
- ← Previous; Season 4 Next → Season 6

Dança dos Famosos 5 was the fifth season of Brazilian reality television show Dança dos Famosos which premiered February 24, 2008 and ended May 11, 2008 on the Rede Globo television network.

Ten celebrities were paired with ten professional ballroom dancers. Fausto Silva and Adriana Colin were the hosts for this season.

Actress Christiane Torloni won the competition over Malhação Cast Member Rafael Almeida.

== Overview ==
- The season follows the same split-by-gender style from the last couple of seasons. It was the last season to feature the semi-final four-down-to-two format, as well a Final Two in Finale Night.
- At 51, Christiane Torloni became the oldest winner in the history of the show. Ironically, she beat Rafael Almeida, who at 18, is the youngest finalist and contestant that the show ever had.

== Couples ==
The ten professionals and celebrities that competed were:

Celebrity	Occupation	Professional Partner	Status
Dudu Nobre	Singer & Compositor	Robertha Portela	Eliminated 1st on February 24, 2008
Perlla	Funk Singer	Guilherme Abilhôa	Eliminated 2nd on March 2, 2008
Maurício Lima	Former Volleyball Player; 2004 Olympic Gold Medalist	Carla Prata	Eliminated 3rd on March 9, 2008
Joana Balaguer; Returned to Competition	Actress	Rogerio Mendonça	Eliminated 4th on March 16, 2008
Joana Balaguer	Actress	Rogerio Mendonça	Withdrew on March 30, 2008
Mariana Weickert	Top Model & TV Host	Marcelo Chocolate	Eliminated 5th on April 6, 2008
Francisco Cuoco	Actor	Renata Mattos	Eliminated 6th on April 13, 2008
Marco Antônio Gimenez	Actor	Aline Alves	Eliminated 7th on April 27, 2008
Samara Felippo	Actress	João Ricardo Vieira	Eliminated 8th on April 27, 2008
Rafael Almeida	Malhação Cast Member	Jaqueline Fernandes	Runners-Up on May 11, 2008
Christiane Torloni	Actress	Álvaro Reis	Winners on May 11, 2008

== Scoring Chart ==
Red numbers indicate the couples with the lowest score for each week.
Green numbers indicate the couples with the highest score for each week.

indicates the couple (or couples) eliminated that week.
indicates the returning couple that finished in the bottom two.
indicates the couple withdrew from the competition.
indicates the couple that would have been eliminated had an elimination taken place.
indicates the semifinal winning couple.
indicates the wild card winning couple.
indicates the winning couple.
indicates the runner-up couple.

Team	Place	1	2	3	4	5	6	7	8	9	10	11
Christiane & Álvaro	1	–	50	—	46	—	48	50	48	50	—	79+80=159
Rafael & Jaqueline	2	44	—	48	—	—	48	50	48	48	49	80+75=155
Samara & João	3	–	46	—	48	–	45	46	48	49	47	
Marco Antônio & Aline	4	45	—	47	—	—	44	48	43	49	45	
Francisco & Renata	5	48	—	45	—	—	46	45	45			
Mariana & Chocolate	6	—	49	–	45	—	47	44				
Joana & Rogerio	7	–	48	—	44	50	WD					
Mauricio & Carla	8	43	—	47		48						
Perlla & Guilherme	9	—	45			45						
Dudu & Robertha	10	40				44						

== Average Chart ==
This table only counts dances scored on the traditional 50-point scale.

Rank	Place	Couple	Total	Dances	Average
1	1	Christiane & Alvaro	391	8	48.9
2	2	Rafael & Jaqueline	430	9	47.7
3	7	Joana & Rogerio	142	3	47.3
4	3	Samara & João	329	7	47.0
5	6	Mariana & Chocolate	185	4	46.3
6	8	Mauricio & Carla	138	3	46.0
7	4	Marco Antônio & Aline	321	7	45.9
8	5	Francisco & Renata	229	5	45.8
9	9	Perlla & Guilherme	90	2	45.0
10	10	Dudu & Robertha	84	2	42.0

== Call-Out Order ==
The table below lists the order in which the contestants' fates will be revealed by Faustão.

Order	Episodes									
Order	1	2	3	4	6	7	8	9	10	11
1	Christiane	Francisco	Christiane	Francisco	Christiane	Christiane	Christiane	Christiane	Christiane	Christiane
2	Joana	Marco	Joana	Marco	Rafael	Rafael	Rafael	Samara	Rafael	Rafael
3	Mariana	Mauricio	Mariana	Rafael	Mariana	Samara	Samara	Marco	Samara	
4	Perlla	Rafael	Samara	Christiane	Francisco	Marco	Marco	Rafael	Marco	
5	Samara	Christiane	Francisco	Samara	Samara	Francisco	Francisco			
6	Francisco	Mariana	Marco	Mariana	Marco	Mariana				
7	Marco	Joana	Rafael	Joana	Joana					
8	Rafael	Samara	Mauricio							
9	Mauricio	Perlla								
10	Dudu									

The celebrity did not perform
The celebrity was brought back into the competition, but had to withdraw
The celebrity was eliminated
The celebrity won the competition

- Episode 5 was the wild card round.

== Weekly results ==
=== Week 1 ===
Week 1 – Men

- Style: Bolero

Aired: February 24, 2008

=== Week 2 ===
Week 1 – Women

- Style: Bolero

Aired: March 2, 2008

=== Week 3 ===
Week 2 – Men

- Style: Merengue

Aired: March 9, 2008

=== Week 4 ===
Week 2 – Women

- Style: Merengue

Aired: March 16, 2008

=== Week 5 ===
Repechage

- Style: Gypsy

Aired: March 23, 2008

=== Week 6 ===
Top 7

- Style: Forró

Aired: March 30, 2008

=== Week 7 ===
Top 6

- Style: Lambada

Aired: April 6, 2008

=== Week 8 ===
Top 5

- Style: Paso Doble

Aired: April 13, 2008

=== Week 9 ===
Top 4 – Week 1

- Style: Maxixe

Aired: April 20, 2008

=== Week 10 ===
Top 3 – Week 2

- Style: Hip Hop

Aired: April 27, 2008

=== Week 11 ===
Top 2

- Style: Samba & Tango

Aired: May 11, 2008

== Dance Chart ==
Couple	1	2	3	4	5	6	7	8	9	10	11	
Christiane & Álvaro	—	Bolero	—	Merengue	—	Forró	Lambada	PasoDoble	Maxixe	—	Samba	Tango
Rafael & Jaqueline	Bolero	—	Merengue	—	—	Forró	Lambada	PasoDoble	Maxixe	Hip Hop	Samba	Tango
Samara & João	—	Bolero	—	Merengue	—	Forró	Lambada	PasoDoble	Maxixe	Hip Hop		
Marco Antônio & Aline	Bolero	—	Merengue	—	—	Forró	Lambada	PasoDoble	Maxixe	Hip Hop		
Francisco & Renata	Bolero	—	Merengue	—	—	Forró	Lambada	PasoDoble				
Mariana & Chocolate	—	Bolero	—	Merengue	—	Forró	Lambada					
Joana & Rogerio	—	Bolero	—	Merengue	Gypsy	Forró						
Maurício & Carla	Bolero	—	Merengue		Gypsy							
Perlla & Guilherme	—	Bolero			Gypsy							
Dudu & Robertha	Bolero				Gypsy							

Highest Scoring Dance
Lowest Scoring Dance
Withdrawn Dance (Not Performed/Scored)
