= Agora É que São Elas =

2003 Brazilian telenovela

- Genre: Telenovela
- Created by: Ricardo Linhares
- Based on: Cidade das Formigas by Paulo José
- Written by: Maria Elisa Berredo; Flávia Lins e Silva; Filipe Miguez; Márcia Prates; Nelson Nadotti
- Directed by: Roberto Talma
- Starring: Débora Falabella; Paulo Vilhena; Vera Fischer; Miguel Falabella; Marisa Orth; Thiago Fragoso; Maurício Mattar; Francisca Queiroz
- Opening theme: "Ja É" by Lulu Santos
- Country of origin: Brazil
- Original language: Portuguese
- No. of episodes: 143

Production
- Camera setup: Multi-camera

Original release
- Network: TV Globo
- Release: 24 March – 6 September 2003

Agora É que São Elas ("Now It's Their Time") is a Brazilian telenovela produced and broadcast by TV Globo. It premiered on 24 March 2003, replacing Sabor da Paixão, and ended on 6 September 2003, replaced by Chocolate com Pimenta. The telenovela is written by Ricardo Linhares, based on an original idea by Paulo José.

It stars Débora Falabella, Paulo Vilhena, Vera Fischer, Miguel Falabella, Marisa Orth, Thiago Fragoso, Maurício Mattar, and Francisca Queiroz.

== Cast ==
- Débora Falabella as Leonarda "Léo" Mendes Galvão
- Paulo Vilhena as Vitório "Vito" Augusto Ramos Zabelheira
- Vera Fischer as Antônia Mendes Galvão
- Miguel Falabella as João Carlos Ramos Zabelheira "Juca Tigre"
- Marisa Orth as Vaneide Ramos Zabelheira "Vanvan"
- Thiago Fragoso as Rodrigo de Sá Ramos Zabelheira
- Maurício Mattar as Pedro Marques de Mello
- Francisca Queiroz as Maria da Soledade "Sol" Ramos Zabelheira
- Paulo Gorgulho as Joaquim Galvão
- Daniel Ávila as Bruno Mendes Galvão
- Thaís Fersoza as Fátima "Fatinha" Castro Martins
- Rodrigo Prado as Vinícius Castro
- Max Fercondini as Hugo Pitombo
- Sthefany Brito as Elis Pacheco
- Karina Bacchi as Pâmela Bittencourt
- Danni Carlos as Bárbara Guedes "Neném"
- Raoni Carneiro as Felipe Guedes "Montanha"
- Zezé Polessa as Cristina Castro "Tintim"
- Nuno Leal Maia as Honório Castro
- Maria Zilda Bethlem as Ruth "Rutinha" Pitombo
- Otávio Augusto as Modesto Pitombo
- Yoná Magalhães as Sofia Ramos Zabelheira
- Fernanda Paes Leme as Karina Sampaio
- Márcio Kieling as Djalma "Djalminha" Nogueira
- Jerusa Franco as Fernanda "Nanda" Pacheco
- Duda Nagle as Dario Matos "Peteca"
- Preta Gil as Vanusa Silveira
- Ildi Silva as Rosemary "Rose" Silveira
- Joana Fomm as Dinorá Silveira
- Otávio Müller as Deputy Silésio Junqueira
- Karla Tenório as Heloísa
- Hugo Gross as Rogério Frota
- Rodrigo dos Santos as Wanderley Silveira
- Ana Kutner as Silmara
- Anna Cotrim as Ximena
- Lana Guelero as Dadá Matos
- Edyr Duqui as Guadalupe
- Catarina Abdala as Nélia
- João Antônio as Tobias
- Leandro Ribeiro as Iranildo
- Larissa Queiroz as Francisca "Xica"
- Camille Hess as Maria Clara Mendes Galvão
- Thiago Oliveira as Luís Felipe Marques de Mello
- Thaiane Maciel as Alice Marques de Mello
- Nathália França as Raíssa Pacheco
- Natália Souto as Jane Matos
- Samuel Melo as Bento

=== Guest stars ===
- Francisco Cuoco as Raul Ramos Zabelheira
- Laura Cardoso as Cartomante
- Cássia Kiss as Luísa
- Paulo José as Dr. Benigno
- Ana Rosa as Solange
- Marcos Winter as Heitor
- Suzana Pires as Lia
- Aracy Cardoso as Jandira
- Hélio Ribeiro as Dr. Cintra
- Jardel Mello as Dr. Matos
- Cristina Mullins as Dr. Selma
- Cláudia Lira as Gardênia
- Henri Pagnocelli as Dr. Celso
- Antônio Pitanga as Ezequiel
- Daniela Pessoa as Sirlene
- Ana Luíza Camacho as Carolina
- Pietra Victória as Joana
