= Fernanda Rodrigues =

Brazilian actress and television presenter

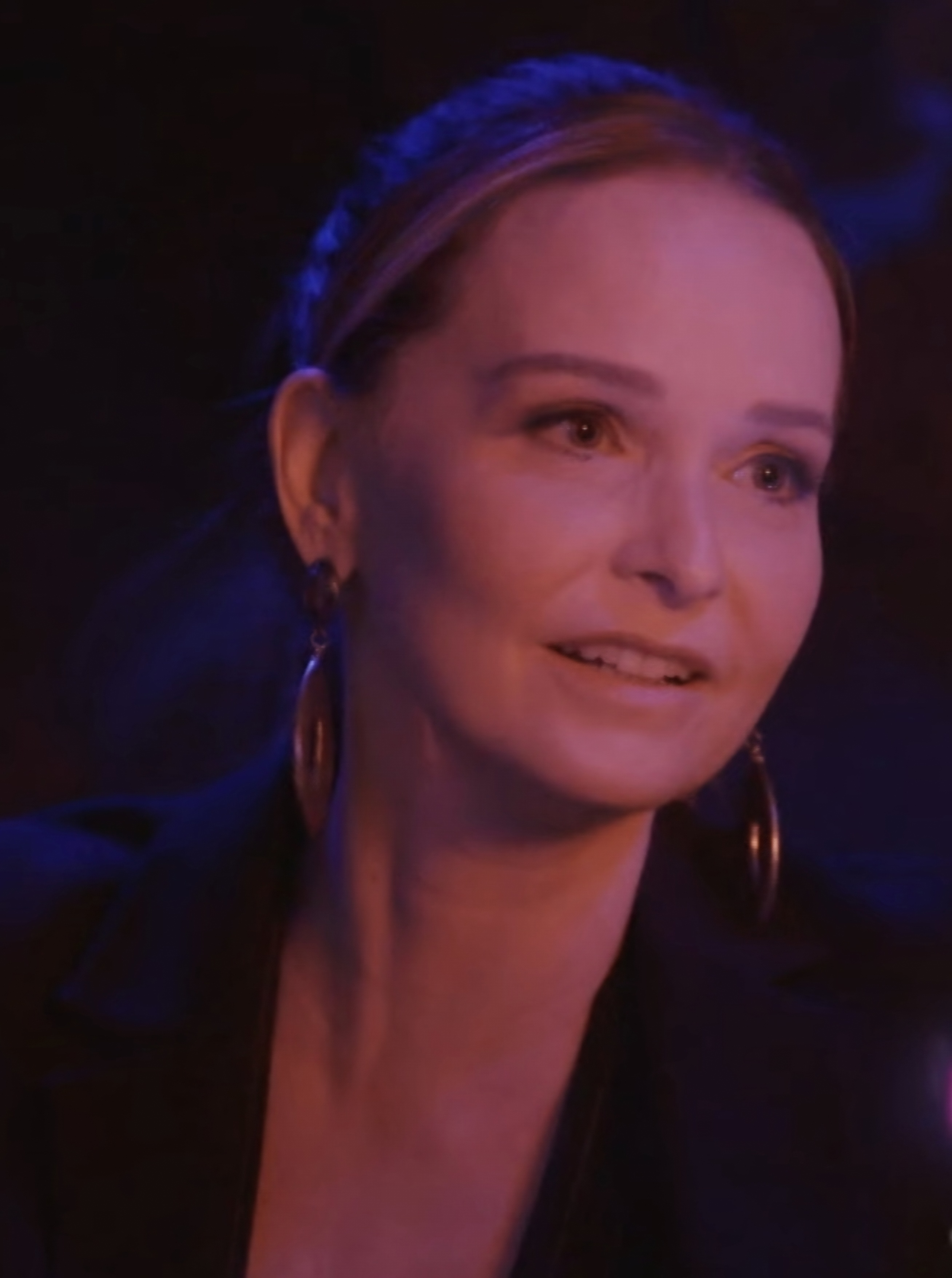
- Rodrigues in 2023
- Born: Fernanda Erlanger Rodrigues; 21 October 1979 (age 47); Rio de Janeiro, Brazil
- Occupations: Actress; television presenter
- Years active: 1991–present
- Spouse: Raoni Carneiro (m. 2022)
- Children: 2

Fernanda Erlanger Rodrigues (born 21 October 1979) is a Brazilian actress and television presenter.

== Career ==
Fernanda Rodrigues began her career as a child, with only three years old have participated in music videos and advertisements. At age 11, debuted as an actress on the soap opera Vamp playing Isa. Since then participated in numerous productions of Rede Globo, among them: Deus nos Acuda, A Viagem, Malhação, Zazá, Corpo Dourado, Vila Madalena, Estrela-Guia, Sabor da Paixão, O Profeta, in addition to historical miniseries Aquarela do Brasil.

In film, she appeared in Simão, o Fantasma Trapalhão, A Partilha, De Morango, and starred in the movie Noite de São João.

She acted in plays like assembling Pollyana, A.m.i.g.a.s. and Beijo no Asfalto. Since 2006, alongside Bruno Mazzeo, protagonist of the Enfim Nós, a romantic comedy. Recently played on the soap opera of Negócio da China Stelinha the Gothic, the first villain in her career.

In 2011, she was applauded by audiences and critics with the character in the novel Jose O Astro, showing every emotion in the skin of a young woman who gives his life for the child. Six days in October, date of death of Joseph in the novel, her character's name appeared on the TT site twitter Brazil, Brazilian recognition of his brilliant performance.

2015 marks the return of Fernanda to the novels in Sete Vidas and launches a new challenge for the actress: to present a program on the GNT channel, Fazendo a Festa, in which each episode the artist together with a team of professionals Make a children's birthday party idealized from the idea of the birthday girl.

== Personal life ==
Rodrigues is married to actor Raoni Carneiro and they have a daughter, Luisa (born on December 11, 2009), and a son, Bento (born on February 11, 2016).

It was Sandy's maid of honor with the musician Lucas Lima of the Família Lima. They've been close since meeting while working together in Estrela Guia. She is the godmother of Cauet, the son of actress Susana Werner with goalkeeper Júlio César.

She and her husband chose people close to them to be godparents of their children. The actor Paulo Vilhena is godfather of Luísa and the actor Ricardo Pereira and his wife Francisca are the godfathers of Bento.

== Filmography ==
=== Television ===
Year	Title	Role	Notes
1991	Os Trapalhões	Little Witch	Episode: "June 23"
1991	Vamp	Isabel "Isa" Ramos Rocha	
1992	Deus nos Acuda	Maria Eduarda "Duda" Garcia	
1993	Caso Especial	Maria Clara	Episode: "Menino de Engenho"
1994	A Viagem	Beatriz "Bia" Toledo Novaes	
1995- 97	Malhação	Luiza Pratta González	Seasons 1–2
1997	Zazá	Valéria "Val" Dumont	
1998	Corpo Dourado	Lígia Mendonça	
1999	Vila Madalena	Zuleika "Zu" Tavares Duarte	
1999	Malhação.com	Luiza Pratta Gonzalez	Episode: "July 16th"
2000	Aquarela do Brasil	Luísa	
2001	Estrela-Guia	Sukhi Sukham	
2002	Brava Gente	Rita de Cássia	Episode: "A Cidade que o Diabo Esqueceu"
2002	Sítio do Picapau Amarelo	Cinderella	Episode: "A Convenção das Bruxas"
2002	Sabor da Paixão	Isadora Lima	
2003	Retrato Falado	Divina Maria	Episode: "Dona Beraldina"
2003	Os Normais	Carol	Episode: "O Magnífico Antepenúltimo"
2005	A Lua Me Disse	Julieta Goldoni	
2006	Bang Bang	Daisy	Episodes: "February 23–27, 2006"
2006	O Profeta	Gisele da Silva "Gigele"	
2008	Casos e Acasos	Letícia	Episode: "Quem Mandou o Bombom?"
2008	Negócio da China	Stela Falcão "Stelinha"	
2011	O Astro	Josephine "Josy" Mello Assunção	
2015	Fazendo a Festa	Presenter	
2015	Sete Vidas	Virgínia Vieira	
2017	A Cara do Pai	Mother of Mateus	Episode: "Encontros e Desencontros"
2017-18	O Outro Lado do Paraíso	Fabiana de Sá Junqueira	
2020	Inimigo Oculto	Karen Alencar	
2023	Fuzuê	Alicia de Braga e Silva	
2023	Show da Virada	Presenter	

=== Films ===
Year	Title	Role	Notes
1998	Simão o Fantasma Trapalhão	Virgínia	
2001	A Partilha	Simone	
2003	Noite de São João	Júlia	
2003	De Morango	Mum	
2014	Vestido pra Casar	Nara	
2020	O Amante de Júlia	Bianca	
2024	Nosso Lar 2: Os Mensageiros	Isis	
2024	Meninas Não Choram	Renata Dias	

=== Internet ===
Year	Title	Role
2012	Sandy - Aquela dos 30	Herself
2020	Live para uma criança	Presenter

=== Music videos ===
Year	Song	Artist	Notes
1996	Vem (Help)	Bitkids	Actress

== Stage ==
Year	Title	Role
1991	Pollyana	Pollyana
1993	A Volta do Imperador	Adelaide
2000	A.M.I.G.A.S.	Dil
2002	O Beijo no Asfalto	Dalia
2006	Enfim, nós	Fernanda
2012	Enfim, nós	Fernanda
2014	Tô grávida	Bianca
