= Francisca Queiroz =

Brazilian actress (born 1979)

- Born: Francisca Vaz Queiroz; September 4, 1979 (age 47); Campinas, Brazil
- Occupation: Actress
- Years active: 2001–present

Francisca Vaz Queiroz (born September 4, 1979) is a Brazilian actress. She played the lead role, Catarina, in the television series A Lei e o Crime.

== Biography ==
Born in Campinas, São Paulo state, her father is an entrepreneur, while her mother is a lawyer. Francisca Queiroz started working as an amateur theater actress, initiating a model career when she was 16 years old. As a model, she traveled to places such as Japan and South Korea, before leaving the career when she was 18 years old. Francisca Queiroz started to study performing arts when she was 14 years old, moving to São Paulo two years later to work in the city's theaters.

== Career ==
After turning 19 years old, Francisca Queiroz graduated at Rede Globo's performing arts academy, named Oficina de Atores. She played her first role in 2001, as a character named Ana, in Globo's miniseries Os Maias. She played her first role as a villain in 2003, in Globo's telenovela Agora é Que São Elas. Francisca Queiroz played the role of paraplegic teacher Vitória in Malhação's 2006 season. Francisca Queiroz played in 2007 another role as a villain, in Rede Record's telenovela Amor e Intrigas. She played her first lead role in 2009, in Rede Record's television series A Lei e o Crime, in which she played Police Chief Catarina.

== Filmography ==
=== Television ===
Year	Title	Role	Notes
2001	Os Maias	Ana	miniseries
2001	Roda da Vida	Bia	telenovela
2002	Marisol	Camila Linhares	telenovela
2003	Agora É que São Elas	Sol	telenovela
2004	Metamorphoses	Ana Valentina	telenovela
2004	Da Cor do Pecado	Carla	telenovela
2005	A Diarista		TV series
2007	Minha Nada Mole Vida	Grace	TV series
2007	Amor e Intrigas	Alexandra	telenovela
2009	A Lei e o Crime	Catarina Laclos	lead role, TV series
2010	Poder Paralelo	Antônia Valentim Cortéz	telenovela
2012	Máscaras	Flávia Mattos	telenovela
2014	Pecado Mortal	Valéria	Episodes: "February 27 – March 4"
2014	Plano Alto	Maria Luisa	
2014	Milagres de Jesus	Ruth	Episode: "O Endemoniado de Gerasa"
2016	Os Dez Mandamentos	Elda	telenovela
2021	Gênesis	Semiramis	Phase: Tower of Babel
2022	Reyes	Ahinoam, Reina de Israel	TV series

=== Cinema ===
Year	Title	Role	Notes
2003	De Passagem		
2004	Irmãos de Fé	Teodora	
2005	5 Mentiras	Nurse	
2006	Os 12 Trabalhos	Francisca	
