= Daniel Ávila =

Brazilian actor (born 1984)

- Born: Daniel Rosenzweig Ávila; December 28, 1984 (age 40); Rio de Janeiro, Brazil
- Occupation: Actor
- Spouse: Karla Tenório (2007-2016)
- Children: 1

Daniel Rosenzweig Ávila (December 28, 1984 in Rio de Janeiro) is a Brazilian actor.

== Biography ==
He began his career as a child, at 6 years of age to be chosen in a test among more than a hundred children, to play the role of Azelino (Zezinho), son of Zé Trovão, in the novel A História de Ana Raio e Zé Trovão of extinct TV Manchete. Since then has not stopped: We work in telenovelas, series, mini-series, educational videos, Theatre and Cinema. The actor is also a voice actor since the age of 9. He graduated in cinema, with postgraduate studies in Cuba.

== Personal life ==
The actor was married to actress Karla Tenório with whom she has a daughter, Flor. The marriage with Karla lasted from 2007 to 2016, and with whom he worked with in novels Agora É que São Elas on Rede Globo and Amigas e Rivais in SBT.

== Filmography ==
=== Television ===
Year	Title	Role	Notes
1990	A História de Ana Raio e Zé Trovão	Zezinho (Azelino Ferreira)	
1993	Você Decide	Júnior	Episode: "Laços de Sangue"
1993	Família Brasil	Leozinho (Leonardo)	
1994	A Viagem	Dudu (Eduardo Jordão)	
1997	Malhação	Hassan	Season 3; Special participation
1998	Corpo Dourado	Kris (Krishtna Filho)	
1998	Era Uma Vez	Cema's boyfriend	Special participation
2000	Você Decide	Daniel	Episode: "Vitória Total e Absoluta"
2000	Malhação	Bruno	Season 7; Special participation
2003	Agora É que São Elas	Bruno	
2004	Um Só Coração	Rudá de Andrade	
2005	Floribella	Adriano Ribeiro	Season 1
2006	O Profeta	Tony (Antônio Ribeiro de Sousa)	
2007	Amigas & Rivais	Beto Delaor (Roberto Delaor Júnior)	
2009	Cinquentinha	Bruno Vilela	
2012	Rei Davi	Jonadabe	
2015	Milagres de Jesus	Bartimeu	Episode: "O Cego de Jericó"

=== Film ===
Year	Title	Role
1998	Simão, o Fantasma Trapalhão	Léo
2010	Bed & Breakfast	Paulo

=== Theater ===
Year	Title	Role
1992	Capitães da Areia	Fuinha
2001	Chapeuzinho Vermelho - O Musical	Hunter
2002	Índigo & Blues	Guto
2003	Endependência	Salvador
2004	Índigo & Blues	Felipe
2009	Bodas de Sangue	
2010	Grupo "Tá na Rua"	Nelsin
2010	Escola de Molieres	Juan
2011	Entre outras e muitas coisas	
