= Samara Felippo =

Brazilian actress

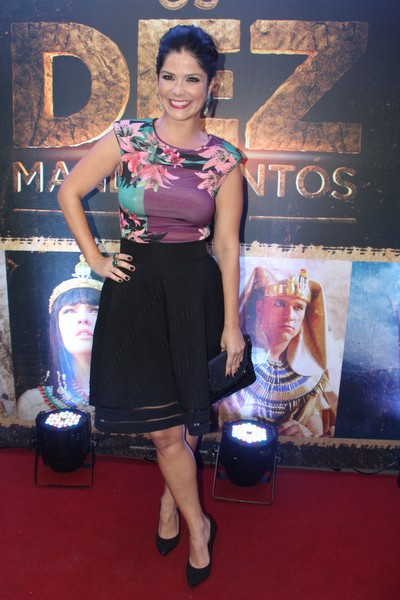
- Felippo at the premiere of the film The Ten Commandments in 2016
- Born: Samara Felippo Santana; 6 October 1978 (age 47); Rio de Janeiro, Brazil
- Occupation: Actress
- Years active: 1996–present
- Height: 1.65 m (5 ft 5 in)
- Partner: Leandro Barbosa (2005–2013)
- Children: 2
- Relatives: Agatha Moreira (cousin)

Samara Felippo Santana (born 6 October 1978) is a Brazilian actress.

== Early life ==
Samara had originally trained to become a gymnast but decided to study drama in order to overcome her inhibitions. At age 17, she decided against taking competitive exams to major in Computer Science upon being offered a place in the school for actors of the television network Rede Globo.

== Career ==
She was invited to join Caça Talentos, a children's morning telenovela (televised soap opera) with Angélica. In early 1997, she participated in the "Star for a Day" segment of the weekly Sunday TV program Domingão do Faustão. Her test was to re-enact a scene in the role of the Nívea Stelmann character in the soap opera A Indomada opposite Matheus Rocha. Her performance was so impressive that it enabled her to participate in other productions of the soap opera broadcast industry.

In her first soap opera, Anjo Mau, Samara plays the young Simone Garcia. Later, she appeared on Meu Bem Querer and Suave Veneno, among others. The highlight of her career came in Malhação, where she portrayed the rebellious Érica Schmidt, a character who discovers she has contracted HIV. In 2003, Felippo played the romantic Mariana, in the miniseries A Casa das Sete Mulheres; later that year she portrayed Celina Costa Andrade Fernandes on Chocolate com Pimenta. In 2004 she was cast on the soap opera Da Cor do Pecado, where she showed her comic skills opposite Karina Bacchi and Rosi Campos. In 2005, she played the coquettish Detinha on América. Exploring her comic side, the character of pedestrians trying to conquer the city and find a boyfriend at all costs.

Samara studied cinema at a college in Rio de Janeiro. As to feature films, she performed in the film O Dono do Mar, produced in Maranhão in 2001 and released in 2006. In another film, Concerto Campestre, which was filmed entirely in Pelotas (RS), she had the lead role.

Also very involved with the theater, Samara has performed in several plays during hiatuses from television work. She played in Êxtase (2007); A frente fria que a chuva traz (2006); Comunhão de Bens (2000); O Guarani (1998).

In 2006, she took part in the miniseries JK, playing the role of Maria Estela Kubitschek and she also played the villainesse Wandinha in O Profeta. In 2007, the actress dubbed the role of Colette in the animated film Ratatouille and participated in the TV Globo soap opera Sete Pecados." In 2008, she participated in the reality show Domingão do Faustão, Dança dos Famosos 5. And in the same year she performed in a few episodes of Casos e Acasos, again on TV Globo. She also performed in the theater play Intenções Perigosas.

In 2009, the actress withdrew for a while from soap operas. In 2010, she returned to television to perform in one of the episodes of S.O.S Emergência.

In 2011, she performed in the play Hamlet and in the play Mulheres Alteradas, replacing Adriane Galisteu. In October of that year, she was cast in the miniseries on the life of Dercy Gonçalves which debuted in January 2012 on TV Globo. In the miniseries she had the role of Maria Decimar, daughter of the comedian.

In July 2012, the actress signed with Rede Record. In 2013, the actress was cast as Dinah in the Biblical miniseries José do Egito. In the same year, she returned to the theater in Orgulhosa Demais, Frágil Demais, where she portrayed Marilyn Monroe.

In January 2014, she signed a contract with Globo, and will be in the series O Caçador playing the role of stripper Paulinha Tsunami. In 2015, Samara gave life to Jochebed in the first phase of the novel Os Dez Mandamentos. In 2017, Samara will return the screens in the novel Apocalipse, in which she will play a police officer.

== Personal life ==
She married a basketball player Leandro Barbosa in 2008, and they had a child together, a daughter on June 25, 2009. In December 2010, the couple separated, but reconciled again six months later. But, in September 2013, the actress announced their separation again. The actress has a column about the backstage life of NBA basketball in the portal Basketeria.

On May 25, 2013, Samara gave birth to her second daughter.

== Filmography ==
=== Television ===
Year	Title	Role	Notes
1996	Caça Talentos	Gabriela	Episode: "Argus Bobo"
1997	Anjo Mau	Simone Garcia Fachini	
1998	Malhação	Sabrina	Episodes: "June 13–17"
1998	Meu Bem Querer	Baby Amoedo	
1999	Suave Veneno	Gilvânia	
1999	Malhação	Érica Schmidt	Seasons 6–7
2001	O Clone	Diogo's girlfriend	Episode "December 10th"
2001–2002	Sítio do Picapau Amarelo	Snow White	Episode: "Viagem ao País das Fábulas"
2003	A Casa das Sete Mulheres	Mariana	
2003	Chocolate com Pimenta	Celina Costa Andrade Fernandes	
2004	Da Cor do Pecado	Greta Bazaróv	Episodes: "July 8–August 27"
2005	América	Detinha (Maria Odete)	
2006	JK	Maria Estela Kubitschek	
2006	Minha Nada Mole Vida	Cynthia Valéria	Episode: "Ninguém É de Ninguém"; Episode: "Procura-se Uma Namorada"
2006	O Profeta	Wandinha (Wanda Carvalho)	
2007	Sete Pecados	Simone	
2008	Dança dos Famosos	Participant	Season 5
2008	Casos e Acasos	Sofia	Episode: "A Escolha, A Operação e A Outra"
2008	Casos e Acasos	Ana	Episode: "Quem Passou a Noite Comigo?"
2008	Casos e Acasos	Bianca	Episode: "Ele é Ela, Ela é Ele e Ela ou Eu"
2010	S.O.S Emergência	Silmara	Episode: "Um Paciente Indigesto"
2012	Dercy de Verdade	Maria Decimar Martins Senra	
2013	José do Egito	Dinah	
2014	O Caçador	Paulinha Tsunami	Episode: "April 25"
2015	Os Dez Mandamentos	Jochebed (young)	Episodes: "March 24–30"
2017	Apocalipse	Natália Menezes	
2019	Topíssima	Thaís Bevilacqua	Episodes: "October 3–December 6"
2023	Vai na Fé	Vera Caldas	Episodes: "July 25–31"

=== Films ===
Year	Title	Role
2004	Concerto Campestre	Clara Victória
2006	O Dono do Mar	Maria Quertibe
2007	Ratatouille	Colette (Brazilian voice dubbing)
2016	The Ten Commandments: The Movie	Jochebed (young)
2021	Documentário Mulher: Expectativa x Realidade	Narrator
2024	Fazendo Meu Filme	Cristiana Castelino Belluz

== Theater ==
Year	Title	Role
1998	O Guarani	Ceci
2000	Comunhão de Bens	Nice
2006	A Frente Fria que a Chuva Traz	Fabi
2007	Êxtase	Cacau
2008	Intenções Perigosas	Catarina
2011	Hamlet	Ophelia
2011	Mulheres Alteradas	Lisa
2013	Orgulhosa Demais, Frágil Demais	Marilyn Monroe
2019	Mulheres Que Nascem Com os Filhos	Various
