= The Tenants (2009 film) =

2009 Brazilian drama film

- Film poster
- Portuguese: Os Inquilinos
- Directed by: Sėrgio Bianchi
- Written by: Sėrgio Bianchi; Beatriz Bracher
- Produced by: Sėrgio Bianchi
- Starring: Marat Descartes; Ana Carbatti; Umberto Magnani
- Cinematography: Marcelo Corpanni; Gilverto Otero
- Edited by: Andrė Finotti
- Music by: Sėrgio Bianchi
- Release dates: 29 September 2009 (Rio de Janeiro); 26 February 2010 (Brazil)
- Running time: 103 minutes
- Country: Brazil
- Language: Portuguese

The Tenants (Portuguese: Os Inquilinos) is a 2009 Brazilian drama film directed by Sėrgio Bianchi. The film is featured in the Global Lens 2011 film series, sponsored by The Global Film Initiative.

== Cast ==
- Marat Descartes - Valter
- Ana Carbatti - Iara
- Umberto Magnani - Dimas

== Awards ==
- Festival Do Rio - Best Screenplay, Best Supporting Actress
