= Dança dos Famosos season 4 =

Dança dos Famosos
- Season 4
- Celebrity winner: Rodrigo Hilbert
- Professional winner: Priscila Amaral
- No. of episodes: 13

Release
- Original network: Globo
- Original release: March 11 – June 17, 2007

Season chronology
- ← Previous; Season 3 Next → Season 5

Dança dos Famosos 4 was the fourth season of Brazilian reality television show Dança dos Famosos which premiered March 11, 2007 and ended June 17, 2007 on the Rede Globo television network.

Ten celebrities were paired with ten professional ballroom dancers, a decrease over the previous seasons. Faustão and Adriana Colin were the hosts for this season.

Actor & model Rodrigo Hilbert won the competition over actress Elaine Mickely.

== Overview ==
- The season follows the same split-by-gender style from the last couple of seasons.

== Couples ==
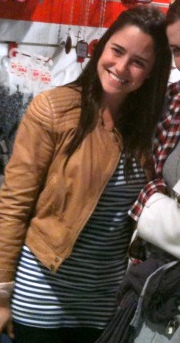
5th place Fernanda Vasconcellos.

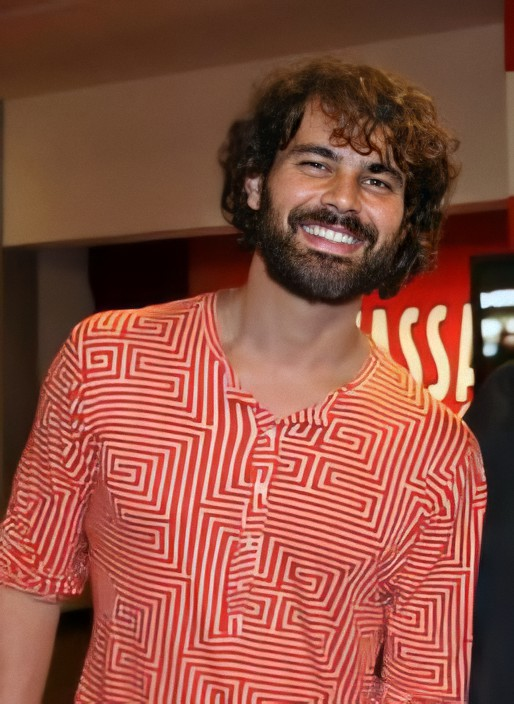
3rd place Carmo Dalla Vecchia.

The twelve professionals and celebrities that competed were:

Celebrity	Occupation	Professional Partner	Status
Carmo Dalla Vecchia; Returned on April 8	Actor	Adriana Mattos	Eliminated 1st on March 11, 2007
Ellen Jabour	Top Model & TV Host	Thiango Mendonça	Eliminated 2nd on March 18, 2007
Roberto Guilherme	A Turma do Didi Comedian	Daiane Amêndola	Eliminated 3rd on March 25, 2007
Mara Manzan	Actress	Leandro Azevedo	Eliminated 4th on April 1, 2007
Fafá de Belém	Singer	Luiz Kirinus	Eliminated 5th on April 15, 2007
Juan Alba	Actor	Renata Mattos	Eliminated 6th on April 22, 2007
Sidney Sampaio	Actor	Carolina Nakamura	Eliminated 7th on April 29, 2007
Cristiana Oliveira	Actress	Álvaro Reis	Eliminated 8th on May 13, 2007
Fernanda Vasconcellos	Actress	Kilve Costa	Eliminated 9th on May 20, 2007
Sergio Loroza	Actor	Sabrina Cabral	Eliminated 10th on June 3, 2007
Carmo Dalla Vecchia	Actor	Adriana Mattos	Eliminated 11th on June 3, 2007
Elaine Mickely	Actress	Átila Amaral	Runners-Up on June 17, 2007
Rodrigo Hilbert	Actor & Model	Priscila Amaral	Winners on June 17, 2007

== Scoring chart ==
Lowest Score	Highest Score	Eliminated	Bottom Two	Wild Card	Top Finalist	Champions	Runners-Up

Team	Place	Week																Finale			
Team	Place	1	2	3	4	5	6	7	8	9	10	11			12			Finale			
Rodrigo & Priscila	1	46	—	46	—	—	48	48	49	48	48	50	50	100	50	49	99	91	99	98	288
Elaine & Átila	2	—	49	—	46	—	49	48	45	50	50	50	50	100	—			96	89	99	284
Carmo & Adriana	3	45				48	49	48	49	46	50	48	50	98	46	48	94				
Sergio & Sabrina	4	50	—	44	—	—	50	48	46	44	50	46	48	94	46	43	89				
Fernanda & Kilve	5	—	47	—	41	—	48	48	45	48	48										
Cristiana & Álvaro	6	—	47	—	50	—	50	50	49	45											
Sidney & Carolina	7	47	—	50	—	—	50	49	41												
Juan & Renata	8	47	—	42	—	—	50	47													
Fafá & Luiz	9	—	45	—	49	—	47														
Mara & Leandro	10	—	48	—	44	48															
Roberto & Daiane	11	47	—	44		48															
Ellen & Thiago	12	—	47			45															

== Average chart ==
This table only counts dances scored on the traditional 50-point scale.

Rank	Place	Couple	Total	Dances	Average
1	2	Elaine & Átila	437	9	48.6
2	6	Cristiana & Álvaro	291	6	48.5
3	1	Rodrigo & Priscila	532	11	48.3
4	3	Carmo & Adriana	527	11	47.9
5	5	Fernanda & Kilve	325	7	47.4
5	7	Sidney & Carolina	237	5	47.4
7	9	Fafá & Luiz	141	3	47.0
8	4	Sergio & Sabrina	515	11	46.8
9	8	Juan & Renata	186	4	46.5
10	10	Mara & Leandro	140	3	46.7
11	11	Roberto & Daiane	139	3	46.3
12	12	Ellen & Thiago	92	2	46.0

== Weekly results ==
=== Week 1 ===
Week 1 – Men

- Style: Bolero

Aired: March 11, 2007

=== Week 2 ===
Week 1 – Women

- Style: Bolero

Aired: March 18, 2007

=== Week 3 ===
Week 2 – Men

- Style: Forró

Aired: March 25, 2007

=== Week 4 ===
Week 2 – Women

- Style: Forró

Aired: April 1, 2007

=== Week 5 ===
Repechage

- Style: Rock and Roll

Aired: April 8, 2007

=== Week 6 ===
Top 9

- Style: Disco

Aired: April 15, 2007

=== Week 7 ===
Top 8

- Style: Samba

Aired: April 22, 2007

=== Week 8 ===
Top 7

- Style: Salsa

Aired: April 29, 2007

=== Week 9 ===
Top 6

- Style: Lambada

Aired: May 13, 2007

=== Week 10 ===
Top 5

- Style: Maxixe

Aired: May 20, 2007

=== Week 11 ===
Top 4 – Week 1

- Style: Foxtrot & Paso Doble

Aired: May 27, 2007

=== Week 12 ===
Top 4 – Week 2

- Style: Waltz & Gypsy

Aired: June 3, 2007

=== Week 13 ===
Top 2

- Style: Zouk, Tango and Surprise Dance (Disco for Elaine and Salsa for Rodrigo)

Aired: June 17, 2007
