= Cecil Thiré =

Brazilian actor and director (1943–2020)

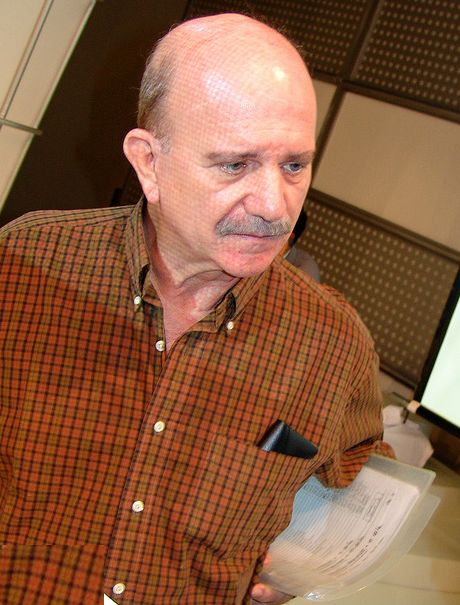
- Thiré in 2020
- Born: 28 May 1943; Rio de Janeiro, Brazil
- Died: 9 October 2020 (aged 77); Rio de Janeiro, Brazil
- Occupations: Actor, director
- Years active: 1952–2013
- Spouses: Norma Pesce (divorced) Carolina Cavalcanti (divorced) Nancy Galvão (m. 2006)
- Children: 4 (including Miguel)
- Parents: Carlos Arthur Thiré (father); Tônia Carrero (mother)

Cecil Aldary Portocarrero Thiré (28 May 1943 – 9 October 2020) was a Brazilian television, film and stage actor, and director.

== Life and career ==
Thiré was born in Rio de Janeiro, the only son of actress Tônia Carrero and artist Carlos Arthur Thiré. He was named after his grandfather Cecil Thiré, a mathematics teacher at Colégio Pedro II and textbook writer.

At the age of 17, he studied acting with Adolfo Celi and worked intensely in theater in the 1960s.

At age 18, he had his first professional job, as assistant director to Ruy Guerra in Os Fuzis. At 19, he directed his first film, the short film Os Mendigos. In 1967, he directed the feature films O diabo mora no sangue and, later, O Ibrahim do subúrbio. As an actor, he was in the cast of more than twenty films, having started at the age of nine, in a small appearance in Tico-Tico no fubá, starring Tônia Carrero.

On television, he acted in telenovelas, miniseries, and comedy programs on Rede Tupi, Rede Globo, and RecordTV. His debut was in 1967, on TV Tupi's telenovela Angústia de amar.

Thiré died on October 9, 2020, aged 77, of Parkinson's disease.

== Career ==
=== Film ===
Year	Title	Role	Notes
1962	Cinco vezes Favela		(segments "Zé da cachorra" and "Pedreira de São Diego")
1962	Os Mendigos		assistant director
1964	Os Fuzis		assistant director
1965	Society em Baby-doll		
1965	Crônica da Cidade Amada		(segment "Aventura Carioca")
1966	Arrastão	Marcos	
1968	O Diabo Mora no Sangue	Indian	director
1969	O Bravo Guerreiro		
1973	Como nos livrar do saco		
1974	Ainda Agarro esta Vizinha	Tatá	
1975	Eu Dou o que ela Gosta		
1976	O Ibraim do Subúrbio		(segment "Ibrahim do Subúrbio")
1979	Muito Prazer	Aquino	
1982	Luz del Fuego		
1988	Fábula de la Bella Palomera		
1991	Manobra Radical	Dr. Bernardo	
1991	Caccia Allo Scorpione D'oro		
1991	Per sempre	Nelson Alberti	
1994	Mil e uma		
1995	O Quatrilho	Padre Gentile	
1998	Caminho dos Sonhos		
2000	Cronicamente Inviável	Luís	
2001	Sonhos Tropicais	Presidente Rodrigues Alves	
2003	Harmada		
2006	Didi, o Caçador de Tesouros	Dr. Samuel Walker	
2009	Bela Noite para Voar	Marechal Henrique Teixeira Lott	
2009	Destino	Dr. Amâncio	

=== Television ===
Year	Title	Role	Channel
1967	Angústia de Amar	Roger	Rede Tupi
1974	O Espigão	Silveirinha	Rede Globo
1975	Escalada	Pascoal	Rede Globo
1975	Caso Especial	Episode: A Ilha do Espaço	Rede Globo
1976	Duas Vidas	Tomás	Rede Globo
1976	Planeta dos Homens	Unknown	Rede Globo
1979	Malu Mulher	Episode: Ainda não é Hora (Doctor)	Rede Globo
1982	Sol de Verão	Virgílio	Rede Globo
1983	Champagne	Lúcio	Rede Globo
1986	Roda de Fogo	Mário Liberato	Rede Globo
1988	Sassaricando	São Sinfrônio	Rede Globo
1989	O Salvador da Pátria	Lauro Brancato	Rede Globo
1989	Top Model	Alex Kundera	Rede Globo
1992	Pedra sobre Pedra	Kléber Vilares	Rede Globo
1993	Cupido Electrónico	Realizador	RTP1
1993	Renascer	Delegado Olavo	Rede Globo
1994	74.5 - Uma Onda no Ar	Álvaro	Rede Manchete
1995	A Próxima Vítima	Adalberto Vasconcelos	Rede Globo
1996	Quem É Você?	Túlio	Rede Globo
1997	Zazá	Dorival (Doc)	Rede Globo
1998	Labirinto	Ernesto	Rede Globo
1998	Malhação	Henrique Otávio (H.O.)	Rede Globo
2000	A Muralha	Dom Bartolomeu Fernandes	Rede Globo
2001	Os Maias	Jacob Cohen	Rede Globo
2001	A Padroeira	Capitão Antunes	Rede Globo
2003	Kubanacan	Senador Ramirez	Rede Globo
2004	Celebridade	Dr. Filipe	Rede Globo
2005	Zorra Total	various	Rede Globo
2006	Cidadão Brasileiro	Júlio Jordão	Rede Record
2007	Vidas Opostas	Mário Carvalho	Rede Record
2009	Poder Paralelo	Armando Orlim	Rede Record
2012	Máscaras	Eduardo Sotero	Rede Record
2013	Se Eu Fosse Você	Sr. Albuquerque	Fox Brasil (final appearance)

=== Stage ===
Year	Title
2002	Variações Enigmáticas
2006	O Último Suspiro da Palmeira
2011	A Lição (Governanta Maria) & A Cantora Careca (Sr. Smith)
