= Pícara Sonhadora =

- Genre: Romantic comedy Telenovela
- Created by: Abel Santa Cruz; Henrique Zambelli; Adriana Moretto
- Based on: La Pícara Soñadora by Abel Santa Cruz
- Directed by: Henrique Martins; Antonino Seabra; Jacques Lagôa
- Starring: Bianca Rinaldi; Petrônio Gontijo; Maria Estela; Serafim Gonzalez; Carmo Dalla Vecchia; Giselle Itié; Karina Bacchi; Norma Blum; Victor Wagner; Marcela Muniz; Giovanni Delgado see more
- Opening theme: Mais um na multidão by Erasmo Carlos and Marisa Monte
- Country of origin: Brazil
- Original language: Portuguese
- No. of episodes: 95

Production
- Executive producers: David Greenberg, daniel scherer and Ulises Aristides,
- Running time: 60 minutes

Original release
- Network: SBT
- Release: August 27 – December 27, 2001

Related
- La Pícara Soñadora (original series)

Pícara Sonhadora (The Mischievous Dreamer) is a Brazilian telenovela that was produced and aired by SBT from August 27 to December 27, 2001. It is a remake of the Mexican telenovela La Pícara Soñadora.

== Cast ==
Actor/Actress	Character
Bianca Rinaldi	Ludmila "Milla" Lopes Rockfield
Petrônio Gontijo	Alfredo Rockfield / Carlos Diniz
Maria Estela	Marcelina Rockfield
Rodolfo de Freitas	Frederico Rockfield
Karina Bacchi	Mônica Rockfield
Martha Mellinger	Grace Rockfield
Serafim Gonzalez	Camilo
Marcela Muniz	Rosa Fernandes
Victor Wagner	José
Giovanni Delgado	Julinho
Milton Levy	Detetive Telles
Paulo Vasconcellos	Detetive 001
Mauro Gorini	Detetive 002
Vanessa Vholker	Giovanna Luchini
Vicentini Gomez	Domingos
Chica Lopes	Luzia
Gigi Monteiro	Erica
Mariana Dubois	Carla
Anastácia Custódio	Olívia
Naura Schneider	Dora
Vitor Mihailoff	Biro
Lulu Pavarin	?
Tony Borges	Carlos Diniz
Danielle Tinti	Cidinha
Gabrielle Lopez	Ângela
Giselle Itié	Bárbara
Bárbara Koboldt	Andréia
Marcus Vinícius Parizatto	Sebastião
Lena Roque	Tonha
Danielle Petrus	Gina
Luciana Vaz	Miriam
Danielle Calmon	Melissa
Ana Paula de Nitto	Flora
Paulo Greca	Fausto
Ítala Morahddei	Aparecida
Kendi	?
Elder Fraga	?
Mariana Molina	Creuza Maria
Felipe Martins	Antônio Celso
Urias Garcia	?
Norma Blum	Leonor Luchini
Luciene Adami	Lúcia
Luís Carlos de Moraes	Molina
Carlo Briani	Gregório Rockfield
Josmar Martins	Salvatore Luchini
Rubens Caribé	Oswaldo
Carmo Dalla Vecchia	Inácio
