= A Padroeira =

Brazilian telenovela by Walcyr Carrasco

- Genre: Telenovela
- Created by: Walcyr Carrasco
- Starring: Deborah Secco; Luigi Baricelli; Maurício Mattar; Elizabeth Savalla; Patrícia França; Luís Melo; Otávio Augusto; Susana Vieira; Paulo Goulart; Mariana Ximenes; Rodrigo Faro; Murilo Rosa; Laura Cardoso; Cecil Thiré; Bianca Byington; Lu Grimaldi; Taumaturgo Ferreira; Daniel de Oliveira; Andréa Avancini
- Opening theme: "A Padroeira"
- Composer: Joanna
- Country of origin: Brazil
- Original language: Portuguese
- No. of episodes: 215

Production
- Running time: 45 minutes

Original release
- Network: TV Globo
- Release: 18 June 2001 – 23 February 2002

A Padroeira is a Brazilian soap opera produced and broadcast by TV Globo, between 18 June 2001, and 23 February 2002.

It is written by Walcyr Carrasco in collaboration with Duca Rachid and directed by Walter Avancini, and stars Deborah Secco, Luigi Baricelli, Maurício Mattar, Mariana Ximenes, Luís Melo, Patrícia França, Paulo Goulart, Rodrigo Faro, Susana Vieira, Otávio Augusto and Elizabeth Savalla in leading roles.

== Synopsis ==
In the turbulent 18th century, Valentim and Cecília are two young people who fall in love but belong to different worlds and will have to fight many for their happiness.

It all begins in 1717 with the arrival in Brazil of Conde de Assumar and his small entourage, including the young Cecília de Sá. The group is attacked by a gang of robbers led by Molina, who kidnaps the girl, enchanted by her beauty. But Valentim comes to her rescue, giving birth to a love that forever changes the lives of the two. Their future is compromised: as soon as Cecília comes home and discovers that her father, Dom Lourenço de Sá, already has a suitor for her hand, the rich and powerful nobleman Dom Fernão de Avelar.

Valentim's past is also a hindrance to the union of the couple: for having refused to deliver the map of some gold mines to the Crown, Valentim's father was considered a traitor, imprisoned and killed in a cell in Lisbon. Valentim was raised by a lawyer uncle, the poet Manuel Cintra. Despite his noble and chivalrous nature, he is broken by the power of the village.

Motivated by his love for Cecília, Valentim goes to great lengths to prove his father's innocence. To do so, he will fight to find the gold mine map. Cecília, who doesn't yield easily to the will of her father, was not enchanted by Dom Fernão, who is rude, gross and arrogant. Humiliated by the rejection, Dom Fernão swears to take revenge and promises that Cecília will be his at any price.

Gold mines are also the interest to assume that the Count carried with him documents that would take them, but were stolen by Molina's gang. This articulates a plan with Blanca de Sevilla, a Spanish woman of Gypsy origin who came to Brazil fleeing the Inquisition, to infiltrate the society of Guaratinguetá and find out where is the map where Molina killed the Jesuit and steal his habit and part of the village, where he is received into the church by Padre José and Juiz Honorato Vilela, who did not distrust the deceiver. Meanwhile, Blanca gets involved with Valentim, taking advantage of his troubled romance with Cecília.

Also the fishermen of the town of Guaratinguetá have a constant struggle: the recognition of the cult of Our Lady of Aparecida, who performed miracles after his image has been found for them in the Paraiba do Sul River and want to take some powerful ambition to its logical conclusion. But the well has a powerful weapon, because when your faith gets to the heart, miracles happen in all the appearances of marriage and suffer silently with the infidelity of a strong friend and ambitious Filipe Pedroso, a cold man, who takes over the action directly, after the mysterious disappearance of his partner, the rich and admired businessman Dom Agostinho de Miranda.

== Cast ==
- Deborah Secco as Cecília de Sá
- Luigi Baricelli as Valentim Coimbra
- Maurício Mattar as Dom Fernão de Avelar
- Elizabeth Savalla as Imaculada de Avelar
- Patrícia França as Blanca de Sevilla
- Luís Melo as Molina
- Susana Vieira as Dorothéia Lopes Cintra "Dodô"
- Otávio Augusto as Manuel Cintra "Mr. Poet"
- Paulo Goulart as Dom Lourenço de Sá
- Mariana Ximenes as Izabel de Avelar
- Rodrigo Faro as Faustino Pereira
- Murilo Rosa as Diogo Soares Cabral
- Bianca Byington as Gertudes de Sá
- Cecil Thiré as Captain Antunes
- Lu Grimaldi as Joaquina Cabral Mendonça
- Taumaturgo Ferreira as Judge Honorato Vilela
- Laura Cardoso as Silvana da Rocha
- Gustavo Haddad as Luís Antunes
- Daniel de Oliveira as Priest Gregório
- Karina Barum as Tiburcina
- Andréa Avancini as Delfina
- Fábio Villa Verde as Brás de Sá "O Alferes"
- Cláudio Gabriel as João Alves
- Cecília Dassi as Zoé
- Renata Nascimento as Marcelina de Sá
- Luiz Antônio do Nascimento as Damião
- Samuel Mello as Cosme
- Mariah da Penha as Eusébia
- Roberto Bomtempo as Aguilar
- Iléa Ferraz as Pureza
- Cida Moreno as Rosário
- Jandir Ferrari as Inocêncio
- Lidi Lisboa as Brásia
- Dani Ornellas as Benta da Silva
- Flávio Ozório as Jacinto
- Fernando Almeida as Gil
- Emanuelle Soncini as Tonha "Antônia"
- Pablo Sobral as Cirilo
- Luciano Vianna as Tabaco
- Renata Peret as Bartira

=== First phase ===
- Yoná Magalhães as Úrsula
- Othon Bastos as Priest José
- Stênio Garcia as Dom Antônio Cabral
- Norton Nascimento as Zacarias
- Isaac Bardavid as Filipe Pedroso
- Jackson Antunes as Atanásio Pedroso
- António Marques as Count of Assumar
- Ida Gomes as Zuleica
- Roney Villela as João Fogaça
- Denise Milfont as Mariquinhas
- Maria Ribeiro as Rosa Maria
- Raquel Nunes as Celeste
- Carlos Gregório as Domingos Martins Correia
- Rafael Rodrigo as Miguel
- Alexandre Drummond as Tiago

=== Guest stars ===
- Felipe Camargo as Frei Tomé
- Giulia Gam as Antonieta Miranda
- Isabel Fillardis as Clarice dos Anjos
- Cláudio Corrêa e Castro as Dom Agostinho Miranda
- Tássia Camargo as Generosa
- Stepan Nercessian as João da Cruz
- Natália Lage as Ana
- Ana Paula Tabalipa as Agnes
