= Sabor da Paixão =

- Created by: Ana Maria Moretzsohn
- Directed by: Denise Saraceni; Fabrício Mamberti; Ulysses Cruz; Maria de Médicis; Vinícius Coimbra
- Starring: Letícia Spiller; Marcelo Serrado; Luigi Baricelli; Arlete Salles; Cássia Kis; Edson Celulari; Aracy Balabanian; Carolina Ferraz; Lília Cabral; Liliana Castro; Daniel Dantas see more
- Opening theme: Sabor da Paixão by Marcus Vinile
- Ending theme: Sabor da Paixão by Marcus Vinile
- Country of origin: Brazil
- Original language: Portuguese
- No. of episodes: 149

Production
- Production location: Brazil
- Running time: 50 minutes

Original release
- Network: Rede Globo
- Release: 30 September 2002 – 21 March 2003

Sabor da Paixão (English: The Taste of Passion) is a Brazilian telenovela produced and broadcast by TV Globo in 2002 and 2003.

== Cast ==
Actor/Actress	Character
Letícia Spiller	Diana Coelho
Luigi Baricelli	Alexandre Paixão
Marcelo Serrado	Nelson Carvalho
Liliana Castro	Laíza Coelho
Arlete Salles	Zenilda Paixão
Cássia Kis	Cecília Coelho
Lima Duarte	Miguel Maria Coelho
Aracy Balabanian	Hermínia Lemos
Edson Celulari	Jean Valjean
Carolina Ferraz	Clarissa Vidigal
Lília Cabral	Edith Rosa
Pedro Paulo Rangel	Vicente Silva
Floriano Peixoto	Xavier Fernandez
Paula Burlamaqui	Tânia Freitas
Fernanda Souza	Teca Coelho
Sérgio Mamberti	Silvano Cilbuski
Suely Franco	Alba Reis
Edney Giovenazzi	Quintino Saraiva
Vanessa Lóes	Branca
Guga Coelho	Juca
Fernanda Rodrigues	Isadora Lima
Cláudio Lins	Luís Felipe
Maria João Bastos	Rita Coimbra
Tuca Andrada	José Carlos
Cássia Linhares	Marina
Daniel Dantas	Edgar Reis
Mila Moreira	Grace Dias
Henri Pagnoncelli	Herculano Vidigal
Ada Chaseliov	Yvone
Miguel Magno	Aloísio
Dill Costa	Marlene
Bruno Giordano	Aderbal
Gustavo Mello	Orlando Lima
Débora Lamm	Paula Souza
Arlindo Lopes	Josefino (Zezinho)
Elaine Mickely	Shirley
Luiz Henrique Nogueira	Sancho
Bruno Ferrari	Guto Reis
Luiza Curvo	Kátia Reis
Pablo Padilla	Hugo
Elisa Lisboa	Fátima
Duarte Guimarães	Pedro Aruca
Eduardo Reis	Ubaldo Lima
Karine Carvalho	Cláudia (Cacau)
Vanessa Pascale	Solange Matos
Alexandre Barbalho	Gaspar
Adrielle Isidório	Fabiana
Marcela Barrozo	Madona Coelho
Ana Beatriz Cisneiros	Alice
Marina Ruy Barbosa	Marie
Tânia Khalill	Sabrina
Clesley Delfino	Tico
Clasley Delfino	Neco
