= Giselle Itié =

Brazilian actress

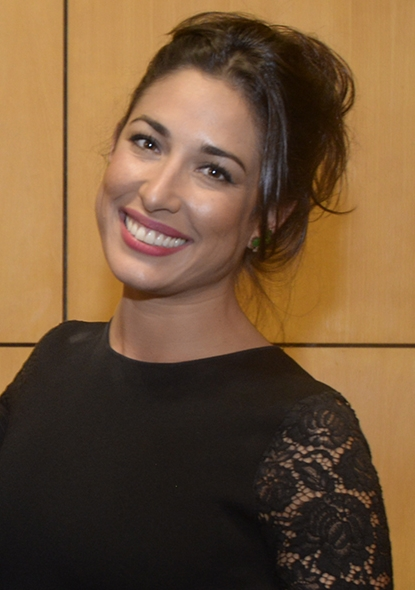
- Itié in 2015
- Born: Giselle Itié Ramos; October 3, 1981 (age 44); Mexico City, Mexico
- Occupation: Actress
- Years active: 2001–present
- Height: 173 cm (5 ft 8 in)
- Spouse: Emilio Dantas (m. 2014; div. 2015)
- Partner: Guilherme Winter (2015–2020)
- Children: 1
- Website: www.giselleitie.com.br

Giselle Itié Ramos (born October 3, 1981) is a Mexican-Brazilian actress. In 2001, she started her career as an actress in a Brazilian telenovela. In 2009, she debuted as protagonist in the telenovela Bela, a Feia, the Brazilian version for the Colombian Yo soy Betty, la fea. Itié also took part in the film The Expendables, co-written, directed by and starring Sylvester Stallone.

== Biography ==
Giselle was born in Mexico City on 3 October 1981 to a Mexican father and a Brazilian mother from São Paulo. Her father and mother lost everything in the earthquake that destroyed Mexico City in 1985. Thereafter, she moved with her family to her mother's native Brazil.

Giselle lied to her family to pursue her artistic career; telling her father that she needed money to pay for a gym membership, she instead spent the money on a theater course at Televisa, the leading television station in Mexico. For eight months the actress stayed at the home of relatives in Mexico, convinced that she wanted to continue pursuing an acting career.

== Career ==
Her long standing desire to work as an actress finally came true at age 18. Disheartened by her modeling career, she signed up for an audition for the miniseries Os Maias after much insistence by an employee of Elite Model Management. Two months later, after auditioning for the Rede Globo miniseries Engraçadinha: Seus Amores e Seus Pecados, based on a novel by Nelson Rodrigues, she received a communiqué from the broadcaster confirming her in the role of Lola in the miniseries. The character in question was a courtesan, forcing Itié to forgo her shyness during some risqué scenes. Still, Giselle was frustrated after Os Maias. Although she expected the series to be renewed in global production, it wasn't.

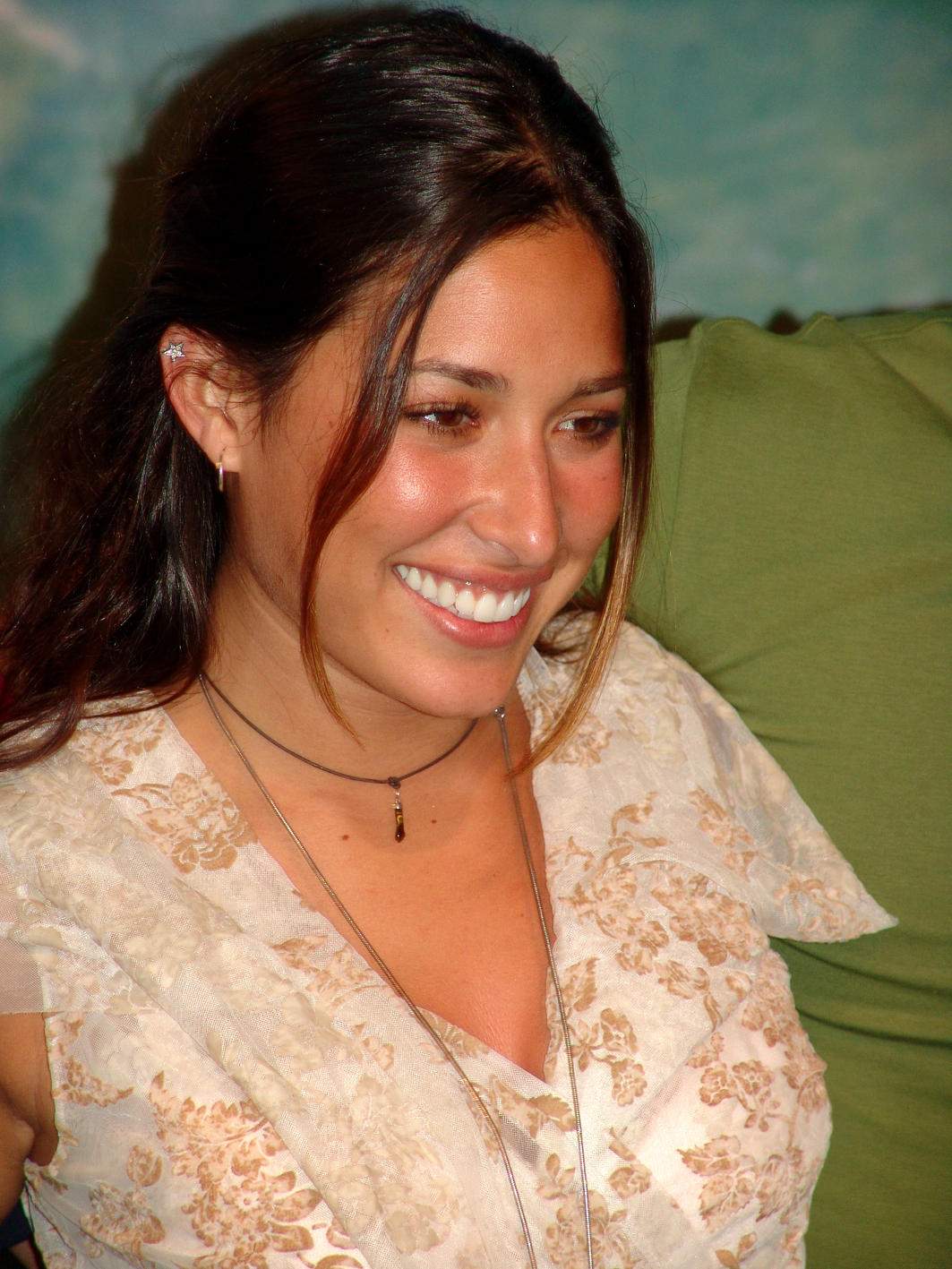
Giselle Itié in January 2006.

The same year, she accepted an audition for Pícara Sonhadora, adapted from the original Mexican production and revived the core of SBT TV dramas. Gisele won the role of the villainess Bárbara, lover of the protagonist played by Petrônio Gontijo.

She was then called by the director Luiz Fernando Carvalho who offered her the role of the character Eulália in the novela Esperança in 2002.

In 2004, she was one of the protagonists of the novela Começar de Novo and in 2005, she appeared in the TV series Mandrake for HBO Brazil. In 2006, she was also one of the protagonists of the show Avassaladoras. In the same year, she acted in the novela Pé na Jaca.

In 2007, she appeared on the show O Mistério da Estrada de Sintra. That same year she acted in the telenovela O Profeta and appeared on the third edition of the segment of the show Domingão do Faustão called "Dança no Gelo". It was going well, getting featured in the program, but a head injury forced her to quit. The actress subsequently made a full recovery from the injury.

In 2008, she participated in several episodes of the series Casos e Acasos and Faça Sua História.

In 2009, she worked on the movie Inversão directed by Edu Felistoque. That same year, the actress was the protagonist of the telenovela Bela, a Feia aired by Rede Record.

The following year, the film The Expendables premiered, in which she played Sandra, opposite Sylvester Stallone.

In 2012, she was one of the protagonists of the telenovela Máscaras produced by Rede Record. It was the same year in two foreign films, On the Road of Walter Salles Jr., and was the film's protagonist Chilean Caleuche: El llamado del mar.

Between 2015 and 2016, she played Zipporah in Os Dez Mandamentos.

== Personal life ==
In 2014, Itié married actor Emilio Dantas. In the same year, she had to leave the cast of Vitória, where she would have played the character Renata (which was subsequently interpreted by Maytê Piragibe), due to a motorcycle accident during their honeymoon in Thailand. In 2015, she and actor Emilio Dantas separated. On November 11, 2015, Itié began a relationship with the actor Guilherme Winter.

== Filmography ==
=== Television ===
Year	Title	Role	Notes
2001	Os Maias	Lola	
2001	Pícara Sonhadora	Bárbara	
2002	Esperança	Eulália	
2003	Carga Pesada	Owner of the orphanage	Episode: "Carga Perecível"
2003	Kubanacan	Belinda	
2004	Começar de Novo	Júlia Magnani	
2005	Oi, Mundo Afora	Presenter	
2005	Mandrake	Amparo	Episode: "Amparo"
2006	Avassaladoras	Silvinha	
2006	Pé na Jaca	Dalila Palhares	Episodes: "November 25, 2006–January 27, 2007"
2007	Nome de Código: Sintra	Carmen	
2007	O Profeta	Sabine Levy	Episodes: "March 5–May 8, 2007"
2007	Dança no Gelo	Herself	Participant (Domingão do Faustão's reality show)
2008	Faça Sua História	Maria da Glória	Episode: "A Vingadora Capixaba"
2008	Casos e Acasos	Manuela	Episode: "O Triângulo, a Tia Raquel e o Pedido"
2008	Casos e Acasos	Lara	Episode: "Quem Passou a Noite Comigo?"
2008	Casos e Acasos	Cristina	Episode: "A Dominatrix, a Venda e a Babá"
2008	Faça Sua História	Guadalupe	Episode: "O Sósia"
2009	Bela, a Feia	Anabela Palhares / Valentina Carvalho	
2010	Inferno: The Making of The Expendables	Herself	Documentary
2012	Máscaras	Manuella Marim	
2012	O Milagre dos Pássaros	Sabô	Special End of Year
2014	Hoje em Dia	Guest Presenter	Episodes: "21–30 July 2014"
2015	Milagres de Jesus	Noemi	Episode: "A Mulher Adúltera"
2015	As Canalhas	Kheyla	Episode: "Marta"
2015	Os Dez Mandamentos	Zipporah	
2017	Belaventura	Selena Falcon	
2019	Homens?		

=== Film ===
Year	Title	Role	Notes
2004	A Babá	Dos Anjos	
2007	O Mistério da Estrada de Sintra	Carmen	
2008	Mais Uma História no Rio	Michele Ferraz	Short film
2009	Flordelis - Basta uma Palavra para Mudar	Cláudia	
2010	Inversão	Mila	
2010	The Expendables	Sandra Garza	
2012	On the Road	Tonia	
2012	Caleuche: El llamado del mar	Isabel Millalobos	
2014	Syndrome	Sarah	
2016	Os Dez Mandamentos: O Filme	Zipporah	
