= Rene Belmonte =

Brazilian screenwriter (1971–2026)

Renê Belmonte (27 January 1971 – 25 May 2026) was a Brazilian television and film screenwriter.

== Life and career ==
Belmonte was born in São Paulo on 27 January 1971. He studied advertising at ESPM in São Paulo then studied filmwriting in London at City Lit. After moving to Rio de Janeiro in 2001 he worked at Total Entertainment for three years, evaluating and developing projects in-house. From 1999 he gave screenwriting courses and workshops for different schools and entities. In television he was segment producer and headwriter for the reality show Temptation Island Brazil (for SBT) and staff writer of the comedy show Sob Nova Direção (TV Globo). In 2006 he was the creator and headwriter of the sitcom Avassaladoras for Fox Television and Record.

For the big screen he wrote Sexo, amor e traição (2004), directed by Jorge Fernando, and Se eu fosse você (2006), directed by Daniel Filho, two of the biggest hits in the recent Brazilian filmography. His later works included the German film Showdebola, directed by Alexander Pickl, and Sexo com Amor, directed by Wolf Maya, with a 2008 summer release date. He also wrote the script of Entre Sábanas, a Colombian film by Gustavo Nieto Roa.

Belmonte died on 25 May 2026, at the age of 55.

== Film credits ==
- Sexo, amor e traição (2004)
- Showdebola (2005)
- Se eu fosse você (2006)
- Sexo com Amor (2008)
- Entre Sábanas (in production)
