= Milagres de Jesus =

- Genre: Series; Drama; Biblical epic
- Directed by: João Camargo
- Starring: Flávio Rocha; Caio Junqueira; Marcello Gonçalves; Maurício Ribeiro; Rodrigo Vidigal; Pierre Santos; Pedro Coelho; Diogo Cardoso
- Country of origin: Brazil
- Original language: Portuguese
- No. of seasons: 2
- No. of episodes: 35

Production
- Producers: Academia De Filmes, Rede Record
- Running time: 50 min.
- Production company: RecordTV

Original release
- Network: RecordTV
- Release: January 22, 2014 – February 24, 2015

Milagres de Jesus (English: The Miracles of Jesus) is a Brazilian television series produced and broadcast by RecordTV. It premiered on January 22, 2014, and ended on February 24, 2015. It was the fifth biblical miniseries produced by RecordTV, succeeding José do Egito. Each episode of the series, had an estimated cost of R$900,000.

== Synopsis ==
The plot of each episode consists of the struggles biblical characters are confronted with. Each episode seeks to give teachings of love, hope, courage and perseverance from people who, through faith, received the Miracles Of Jesus.

== Cast ==
- Flávio Rocha as Jesus
- Caio Junqueira as Simão
- Marcello Gonçalves as André
- Maurício Ribeiro as Tiago
- Rodrigo Vidigal as João
- Pierre Santos as Mateus
- Pedro Coelho as Tomé
- Diogo Cardoso as Judas

== Episodes ==
Season	Episodes	Originally released	
Season	Episodes	First released	Last released
1	18	January 22, 2014	May 21, 2014
2	17	February 2, 2015	February 24, 2015

=== Season 1 (2014) ===
No. overall	No. in season	Title	Original release date
1	1	"A Pesca Maravilhosa"	January 22, 2014
A Pesca Maravilhosa tells how fisherman Simon became a disciple of Jesus, changing his name to Peter.
2	2	"A Mulher Encurvada"	January 29, 2014
The episode A Mulher Encurvada is about the suffering life of Miriam, a beautiful and honorable woman, who completely loses faith after the many difficulties and trials that come her way.
3	3	"Leproso de Genesaré"	February 5, 2014
The story of Leproso de Genesaré shows how deep suffering transforms the personality of Barzilai (Milhem Cortaz), a wealthy fish merchant. Arrogant and very ambitious, Barzilai wants to further prosper his business to give a better life to wife Judith and daughter Livana.
4	4	"Mão Ressequida"	February 12, 2014
The episode Mão Ressequida tells the story of Gerson, a good-hearted Jewish young man who plays the flute very well. Their music enchants Ada, a beautiful young woman of the village where they live that is courted by the brother of Gerson, Chaim.
5	5	"O Endemoniado de Gerasa"	February 19, 2014
Quenate is a good man, who likes to help who needs it, married to the dedicated Ruth (Francisca Queiroz) and father of the loving Neziah. He loves family life, but does not give up drinking in the tavern with his friends Zev and Taré, who are bad influences. Gradually, Kenen begins to be tormented by evil spirits.
6	6	"A Cura do Servo do Centurião"	February 26, 2014
The episode portrays the exciting love and faith relationship between the Roman centurion Fídeas (João Vitti) and his servant Raphael.
7	7	"A Impura"	March 5, 2014
The episode A Impura tells the story of Ana, a sweet and very beautiful woman who lives a marriage full of passion with Matias.
8	8	"O Inválido do Tanque de Betesda"	March 12, 2014
Elói along with cousin Tobias, suffer the consequences of the family land dispute.
9	9	"O Homem Hidrópico"	March 19, 2014
In the episode O Homem Hidrópico, Ester and David live a pure love, make love vows and plan to marry.
10	10	"A Filha de Jairo"	March 26, 2014
This episode tells the story of Débora. Daughter of Jairo (Floriano Peixoto), head of the Synagogue of Capernaum, Deborah has in her father the figure of a hero. Always very loving to his daughter, Jairo is the opposite of society.
11	11	"O Surdo de Decápolis"	April 2, 2014
In the episode O Surdo de Decápolis, Duma is a deaf young man who at the age of five, after his mother's death, was left at the home of his uncles, Hadad and Zima (Bianca Castanho).
12	12	"A Cura do Cego de Nascença"	April 9, 2014
The episode A Cura do Cego de Nascença tells the trajectory of Uriel, a boy of pure soul and simple life, that was born blind. The son of Abner and Bila, Uriel was always very loved and protected, but he had to learn to live with rejection and prejudice early on.
13	13	"A Ressurreição do Filho da Viúva"	April 16, 2014
A Ressurreição do Filho da Viúva narrates a bloody war of Romans against peasants and Nubians, black people who left Egypt. The rural village where the peasants Lairoi, Dalia and Josias live, suffers from the drought. But the news that the Romans are building an aqueduct to bring water to the nearest city is a hope.
14	14	"A Cura do Cego de Jericó"	April 23, 2014
In the episode A Cura do Cego de Jericó, Bartimeu (Daniel Ávila) is a young worker who lives a simple life with his parents Timeu and Ilana (Ítala Nandi), and his brother Naor. Bartimaeus is affected by an eye disease and becomes blind. At this, Naor judges his brother incapable and rejects him. Fearing to be a burden to his family, Bartimaeus leaves home and begins begging in the streets of Jericho.
15	15	"A Cura do Paralítico de Cafarnaum"	April 30, 2014
The episode A Cura do Paralítico de Cafarnaum, tells the story of Quiramin (Petrônio Gontijo), owner of a vineyard and father of young Rubem. He and his associates, Lael (Paul Hamilton) and Genubate, go through difficult periods of low harvest and having to pay the high taxes to the Romans.
16	16	"A Cura de Um Menino Possesso"	May 7, 2014
The episode A Cura de Um Menino Possesso brings the story of Auzate, son of the peasants Hosea and Adira. The village they live in is hit by animal deaths for unknown reasons, until Eminus (Danilo Sacramento), a strong and brave farmer, catches the monster that has been scaring the locals.
17	17	"Os Dez Leprosos"	May 14, 2014
The episode Os Dez Leprosos tells the story of Doran, a humble young man who works to provide services to merchants in the city of Samaria. Doran meets the beautiful Aliza and soon falls in love with the girl. Aliza is the daughter of Yonah and Janus, a rich merchant from the Decapolis who had to flee from the city where he lived due to the disease of Yonah, the leprosy.
18	18	"Milagres em Genesaré"	May 21, 2014
The episode Milagres em Genesaré tells the story of the collective miracle performed by Jesus amid the suspicions of the priest, Pharisees and followers of the laws of Moses.

=== Season 2 (2015) ===
No. overall	No. in season	Title	Original release date
19	1	"A Cura do Filho do Oficial do Rei"	February 2, 2015
The episode "A Cura do Filho do Oficial do Rei" tells the love story between Petronius and Ariela, two young people who see the bonds of friendship turn into true love. Petronius is the son of Joanna and Elianus, a strict official of the king of Rome, who wages a war of egos with the Hebrew Itamar, Ariela's father.
20	2	"A Pecadora que Ungiu os Pés de Jesus"	February 3, 2015
The episode "A Pecadora que Ungiu os Pés de Jesus" tells the story of Diná (Tammy Di Calafiori), a young peasant girl who dreams of having a good marriage and thus living in the big city. Daughter of Tobias, an apple producer, Diná makes no secret of hiding her interest in the boys, and even against the liking of her sister Joana, insists on throwing her charm to Jabim, a fruit merchant, an old customer of Tobias.
21	3	"Milagres à Beira do Mar"	February 4, 2015
The episode "Milagres à Beira do Mar" tells the story of three women: Jessica (Jussara Freire), Gabriela and Isabel. Jessica is an old lady and mother of Jaime (Sergio Abreu). She discovers that he will marry Alessandra, the daughter of a Pharisee, and opposes the union of the two.
22	4	"O Endemoniado de Cafarnaum"	February 5, 2015
The episode "O Endemoniado de Cafarnaum" tells the story of cobbler Gabriel. He is the father of Haya and had to learn to care for his daughter alone after the mysterious disappearance of his wife. While working, Gabriel witnessed a mess in his shop. Fur seller Joel and his employee are killed by the thug who was trying to assault them. Seeing that the deceased carried a sack of gold coins, Gabriel took the money without knowing that there was a great evil there for his life.
23	5	"Um Cego em Betsaida"	February 6, 2015
The episode "Um Cego em Betsaida" tells the story of Gideon (Guilherme Winter), a carpenter and father of a family, he is a proud man and faithful to his religious beliefs, until in a meeting with Marcius, general of the Roman Empire, Gideon lets himself be influenced and accepts the order's forbidden officer.
24	6	"O Publicano e o Jovem Rico"	February 9, 2015
The episode "O Publicano e o Jovem Rico" tells the conflicting story between Jared and Zaqueu. Jared is a young man who has since struggled to achieve his goals. Young and handsome he is considered a great party by the women of the region and a pride for his mother Dinora. Zacchaeus is a dubious tax collector, who always manages to collect more than the debt to be paid, and to the sadness of his wife Gerusa, Zacchaeus is not well-liked by the population. The conflict between Jared and Zacchaeus increases every day, the young man no longer admits being robbed by the publican. But a meeting of the two men with Jesus will show the true essence of each one.
25	7	"A Mulher Cananeia"	February 10, 2015
The episode "A Mulher Cananeia" tells the story of Aion, a Phoenician priest who is famous in Canaan for performing rituals for the goddess Hecate to enable her to attend to the wishes of the population. Aion is married to Lívia and Melissa's father, who always take care of offering fruits and animals to please the goddess. On a mundane day, shoe trader Cadmio and his wife Clodia decide to seek Aion to help them destroy their competitor, Atamas. Áthamas is a good man and a prosperous merchant, who has finally awakened the envy of the couple. Wandering around the city is Romulus, brother of Aion, disinherited by the family and marginalized for being a leper. He has a beautiful encounter with Jesus, who graces him with a miracle and the cure of leprosy.
26	8	"O Endemoniado Cego e Mudo"	February 11, 2015
The episode "O Endemoniado Cego e Mudo" tells the story of forbidden love between the beautiful Naomi (Mariana Molina) and the Levite Aziz. The young people have a pure and sincere love, but they will have to face the refusal of Baena, Naomi's father, who does not accept their relationship.
27	9	"A Multiplicação dos Pães e Peixes"	February 12, 2015
The episode "A Multiplicação dos Pães e Peixes" tells the story of a Jewish family that has their barley plantation, the family's only sustenance, destroyed by a plague of locusts.
28	10	"A Mulher Samaritana"	February 13, 2015
The episode "A Mulher Samaritana" tells the story of the young Yarin, who was sold by her father Simon to the old Zebulon, a widower who lives with the boy Dan, son of his deceased wife. Zebulon stayed with the girl in the future she became his wife.
29	11	"Milagres em Samaria"	February 16, 2015
The episode "Milagres em Samaria" continues to tell the saga of Yarin that was transformed before the words of Jesus, and now tries to convince Youssef that the messiah is able to save the life of his nephew. Faced with the worsening of the boy, Youssef decides to take him to Jesus. The messiah heals the son of Sarah and Saul.
30	12	"A Mulher Adúltera"	February 17, 2015
The episode "A Mulher Adúltera" presents the story of Noemi (Giselle Itié). Married to Saul, a successful merchant from Jerusalem, Noemi is still satisfied with the marriage, but recently the fact that her husband is reserved and unassuming, very different from her brother-in-law Efraim (Luciano Szafir), a cheerful and affectionate for his sister Talia.
31	13	"A Ressurreição de Lázaro"	February 18, 2015
The episode "A Ressurreição de Lázaro" tells the story of a young boy who in his childhood created a great bond of friendship with the baby Jesus. Lázaro's father is a great farmer and passed on to his son all values and knowledge. After the death of his father, Lázaro assumed all responsibilities, taking care of the older sisters Marta and Maria and also of the olive plantations. His neighbor Elisha had great interest in his lands, but Lazarus refuses to sell them.
32	14	"A Cura do Servo do Sumo Sacerdote"	February 19, 2015
The episode "A Cura do Servo do Sumo Sacerdote" tells the story of Malco, a man thirsting for the conquest of being head of the temple, position given to men of integrity, without any moral and physical defect. To do this, Malco would have to be the first to capture Jesus, a request made by the high priest Caiaphas who saw Jesus as a false prophet.
33	15	"Barrabás"	February 20, 2015
The episode "Barrabás" speaks of forgiveness, freshness and love. As usual, during the Passover period, the Hebrews released a prisoner chosen by the people. Pilate presents the people with two options: Jesus or the notorious bandit Barabbas must be chosen for freedom.
34	16	"Os Dois Ladrões"	February 23, 2015
"Os Dois Ladrões" tells the story of the brothers Gedeão and Zanoa, who have lived as bandits since their adolescent times. They were captured by the Roman army after Gideon committed one of his most terrible crimes, the murder of an innocent boy, who was later resurrected by Jesus. Confined in the dungeon of Jerusalem, they await the sentence soon to be promulgated and recall the sad facts of their life, from the time they were children.
35	17	"A Crucificação"	February 24, 2015
The episode "A Crucificação" tells the saga of the prophet after being captured.

== Broadcast ==
The first season had 18 episodes shown on Wednesdays at 9:45 p.m. (BRT/AMT) from January 22 to June 23, 2014. This season was re-run between January 5 and January 29, 2015, from Monday to Thursday at 10:30 p.m. (BRT/AMT). The second and last season was shown between February 2 to February 24, 2015, from Monday to Thursday at 10:30 p.m. (BRT/AMT).

In the United States it aired on MundoMax from September 29, 2015, to November 16, 2015. Univision also aired the series from June 4, 2017, to July 23, 2017.

== Rating ==
Season	Timeslot (BRT/AMT)	Episodes	First aired		Last aired	
Season	Timeslot (BRT/AMT)	Episodes	Date	Viewers (In points)	Date	Viewers (In points)
1	Wednesday 9:45pm	18	January 22, 2014	10.4	May 22, 2014	9.6
2	Mon–Thur 10:30pm	17	February 2, 2015	7.7	February 24, 2015	7.6
