= List of Brazilian films of 2020 =

This is a list of Brazilian films released in 2020.

== Films ==
Title	Director	Cast	Notes	Ref
Airplane Mode (Modo Avião)	César Rodrigues	Larissa Manoela, Erasmo Carlos, Katiuscia Canoro, André Frambach		
All the Dead Ones (Todos os mortos)	Caetano Gotardo	Mawusi Tulani, Clarissa Kiste, Carolina Bianchi, Thaia Perez, Agyei Augusto		
Dry Wind (Vento seco)	Daniel Nolasco	Leandro Faria Lelo, Allan Jacinto Santana, Rafael Theophilo, Renata Carvalho		
Executive Order (Medida Provisória)	Lázaro Ramos	Alfred Enoch, Taís Araújo, Seu Jorge, Adriana Esteves		
Just Another Christmas (Tudo Bem no Natal que Vem)	Roberto Santucci	Leandro Hassum, Elisa Pinheiro, Danielle Winits		
Karnawal	Juan Pablo Félix	Alfredo Castro, Martin López Lacci, Mónica Lairana, Diego Cremonesi, Adrián Fondari, Sergio Prina, José Luis Arias, Ángel Apolonio Cruz, Fernando Lamas Ventura		
Memory House (Casa de Antiguidades)	João Paulo Miranda Maria	Antônio Pitanga, Ana Flávia Cavalcanti, Sam Louwyck		
Nahuel and the Magic Book (Nahuel y el Libro Mágico)	Germán Acuña Delgadillo			
The Passion According to G.H. (A Paixão Segundo G.H.)	Luiz Fernando Carvalho	Maria Fernanda Cândido		
Rich in Love (Ricos de Amor)	Bruno Garotti, Anita Barbosa	Danilo Mesquita, Giovanna Lancellotti, Fernanda Paes Leme		
Shine Your Eyes (Cidade Pássaro)	Matias Mariani	O.C. Ukeje, Paolo André, Barry Igujie		
Skull: The Mask (Skull: A Máscara de Anhangá)	Armando Fonseca, Kapel Furman	Natallia Rodrigues, Wilton Andrade, Ricardo Gelli		
