= Vidas Paralelas =

Brazilian telenovela

- Genre: Romance; Drama
- Created by: Walcyr Carrasco; Cristianne Fridman
- Written by: Walcyr Carrasco (head writer)
- Directed by: Adriano Melo
- Starring: Giullia Buscacio; Flávia Alessandra; Marcelo Serrado; André Luiz Frambach; Kelzy Ecard; Bia Montez; Felipe Camargo; Olívia Araújo; Danilo Maia; Caroline Dallarosa; Andrea Dantas
- Country of origin: Brazil
- Original language: Portuguese
- No. of episodes: 60 (expected)

Production
- Camera setup: Multi-camera
- Running time: 45 minutes
- Production company: Estúdios Globo

Original release
- Network: TV Globo

Vidas Paralelas is an upcoming Brazilian telenovela produced and broadcast by TV Globo, scheduled to premiere in the first half of 2026. It will be the network’s first-ever "novela das cinco" (5 p.m. telenovela). (Note: A new programming slot created by TV Globo to replace the long-running youth soap opera Malhação.)

Created and written by Walcyr Carrasco, the telenovela will feature co-authorship by Cristianne Fridman and direction by Adriano Melo.

The main cast includes Giullia Buscacio, Flávia Alessandra, Marcelo Serrado, André Luiz Frambach, Kelzy Ecard, Bia Montez, Felipe Camargo, and Olívia Araújo.

== Cast ==
Actor	Character
Giullia Buscacio	TBA
Flávia Alessandra	TBA
Marcelo Serrado	TBA
André Luiz Frambach	TBA
Kelzy Ecard	TBA
Bia Montez	TBA
Felipe Camargo	TBA
Olívia Araújo	TBA
Caroline Dallarosa	TBA
Danilo Maia	TBA
Andrea Dantas	TBA

== Production ==
=== Background ===
Between 1975 and 1979, TV Globo produced short telenovelas in its 6 p.m. slot, most of which had fewer than 100 episodes. These served as counterprogramming to rival network Rede Tupi. Exceptions during this period included Dona Xepa (1977), Maria, Maria (1978), A Sucessora (1978–79), and Cabocla (1979).

In 1981, Globo aired Terras do Sem-Fim, the last short-format telenovela in that time slot. After that, most telenovelas in Globo’s main slots averaged around 100 episodes, with some reaching up to 200. One rare exception was O Fim do Mundo (1996), produced as a last-minute replacement for Explode Coração (1995–96), due to Gloria Perez taking time off to attend the trial of her daughter Daniella Perez’s murder case.

In 2000, TV Globo launched Esplendor, written by Ana Maria Moretzsohn, in the 6 p.m. slot, marking a return to short-format telenovelas. Initially planned for only 75 episodes, the show was extended to 125 due to delays in O Cravo e a Rosa (2000–01).

Estrela-Guia (2001) was the last telenovela in the time slot to remain under 100 episodes, designed as a “summer telenovela.” The short-format model would later be adopted in the 11 p.m. slot and in productions for Globoplay.

==== Development ====
On 28 September 2021, TV Globo announced the cancellation of Malhação: Transformação and Malhação: Eu Quero Ser Feliz after evaluating the fatigue of the long-running youth soap opera format. The franchise had not released new seasons since Toda Forma de Amar, which had its ending altered due to COVID-19 safety measures. This marked the end of a nearly 27-year run from 1995 to 2022.

Following the announcement, the network began exploring a new telenovela slot to replace Malhação. The new format would feature shorter scripts, capped at 50 episodes, with a leaner cast and a focus on emerging talent.

Four years later, on 28 April 2025, reports surfaced that TV Globo was planning to launch a new telenovela slot between Vale a Pena Ver de Novo and the 6 p.m. telenovelas—essentially reclaiming the time previously occupied by Malhação. The first production in this new slot would be helmed by Walcyr Carrasco, who submitted ten episodes for evaluation.

The concept for the new slot centers on short titles, capped at 60 episodes, inspired by K-dramas—with a strong emphasis on romantic drama. The working title for the first telenovela was Vidas Paralelas.

Other titles considered included Quem é Morto Sempre Aparece and Como se Livrar de Um Grande Amor. The former was eventually used as the title of a telefilm produced by Rede Telecine.

==== Writing and approval ====
On 1 July 2025, Cristianne Fridman was chosen to take over the writing of the telenovela, assuming nearly the entire script, while Carrasco remained responsible only for the initial episodes. The project marks Fridman's return to TV Globo since her work on Malhação 2003 as part of the writing team. The telenovela was officially approved by Globo’s management on 11 July after the pilot episodes were reviewed.

=== Casting ===
In May 2025, Giullia Buscacio was announced as the lead actress of the new telenovela, following her breakout performance in the remake of Renascer (2024) and screen tests for Vale Tudo (2025).

André Luiz Frambach was cast as the male lead, marking his return to a regular role since the end of Cara e Coragem (2022) and his guest appearance in No Rancho Fundo (2024).

Flávia Alessandra, who had been away from telenovelas since Salve-se Quem Puder (2020–21), was initially announced as part of the main cast of Êta Mundo Melhor! (2025–26), but ultimately made only a guest appearance in that production and took on one of the lead roles in Vidas Paralelas.

Marcelo Serrado, Kelzy Ecard, and Bia Montez were also confirmed in the cast. Serrado returns to Globo telenovelas after Cara e Coragem (2022–23), Ecard after Todas as Flores (2022–23), and Montez after Fuzuê (2023–24).

Additional cast members include Olívia Araújo and Danilo Maia, both recently seen in Fuzuê.

Caroline Dallarosa, known for her role in Além da Ilusão (2022), was added to the cast alongside Felipe Camargo, who returns to telenovelas after Espelho da Vida (2018–19).
