= Dança dos Famosos season 8 =

Dança dos Famosos
- Season 8
- Celebrity winner: Miguel Roncato
- Professional winner: Ana Flavia Simões
- No. of episodes: 14

Release
- Original network: TV Globo
- Original release: May 22 – September 4, 2011

Season chronology
- ← Previous; Season 7 Next → Season 9

Dança dos Famosos 2011 is the eighth season of the Brazilian reality television show Dança dos Famosos which premiered on May 22, 2011 at 7:30 / 6:30 p.m. (BRT / AMT) on TV Globo, following a cast reveal special that aired on May 15.

On September 4, 2011, actor Miguel Roncato & Ana Flavia Simões won the competition over comedian Nelson Freitas & Carol Agnelo, thus making him the youngest winner of the series, aged 18.

== Couples ==
Celebrity	Notability (known for)	Professional	Status
Roberta Miranda	Singer	Danniel Navarro	Eliminated 1st on May 22, 2011
MV Bill	Rapper	Carol Vieira	Eliminated 2nd on May 29, 2011
Renata Kuerten	Model	Rodrigo Picanço	Eliminated 3rd on June 5, 2011
Guilherme Winter Returned on July 3	Actor	Leticia Weiss	Eliminated 4th on June 12, 2011
Ellen Rocche	Actress	Marcelo Amorim	Eliminated 5th on June 19, 2011
Odilon Wagner Returned on July 3	Actor	Roberta Appratti	Eliminated 6th on June 26, 2011
Milena Toscano	Actress	Diego Borges	Eliminated 7th on July 24, 2011
Guilherme Winter	Actor	Leticia Weiss	Eliminated 8th on July 31, 2011
Raphael Viana	Actor	Dani de Lova	Eliminated 9th on August 7, 2011
Monica Martelli	Actress	Wagner Santos	Eliminated 10th on August 14, 2011
Roberta Rodrigues	Actress	Carlos Fernandes	Eliminated 11th on August 21, 2011
Odilon Wagner	Actor	Roberta Appratti	Eliminated 12th on August 28, 2011
Nelson Freitas	Comedian	Carol Agnelo	Runner-up on September 4, 2011
Miguel Roncato	Actor	Ana Flavia Simões	Winner on September 4, 2011

== Elimination chart ==
Couple	Place	Judges' votes							Judges' scores						
Couple	Place	1	2	3	4	5	6	7	8	9	10	11	12	13	14
Miguel & Ana Flavia	1	—	0	—	0	—	1	—	—	49	50	49	50	45	191
Nelson & Carol	2	—	0	—	0	—	2	—	—	48	46	49	49	48	196
Odilon & Roberta	3	—	2	—	2	—	3	3	50	—	46	46	49	49	
Roberta & Carlos	4	2	—	0	—	1	—	—	—	50	44	49	47		
Monica & Wagner	5	0	—	0	—	0	—	—	50	—	46	45			
Raphael & Dani	6	—	0	—	1	—	0	—	47	—	42				
Guilherme & Leticia	7	—	0	—	4			6	—	46					
Milena & Diego	8	0	—	0	—	2	—	—	48						
Ellen & Marcelo	9	2	—	1	—	3		0							
Renata & Rodrigo	10	0	—	5				1							
MV Bill & Carol	11	—	4					2							
Roberta & Daniel	12	3						0							

Lowest score
Highest score
Winner
Runner-up
Returned
Saved last
Eliminated

== Weekly results ==
A – Artistic jury average score	T – Technical jury average score	S – Studio audience score	V – Viewers at home score
Saved last		Eliminated	

=== Week 1 ===
Week 1 – Women

- Style: Disco

Artistic judges			Technical judges		Skype judge (Tiebreaker)
1	2	3	4	5	Skype judge (Tiebreaker)
Luis Maluf	Emanuelle Araújo	André Marques	Fernanda Chamma	Paulo Goulart Filho	Artur Xexéo

Running order

Couple	Judges' votes					Jury votes	Combined votes				Week total	Final total	Result
Couple	1	2	3	4	5	Jury votes	A	T	Studio	Skype	Week total	Final total	Result
Roberta & Carlos	✔			✔		2	—			Tied	—	2	Advanced
Renata & Rodrigo						0	—			—	—	0	Advanced
Roberta & Danniel					✔	1	—		✔	Tied	—	3	Dance-off
Ellen & Marcelo		✔	✔			2	—			Tied	—	2	Advanced
Milena & Diego						0	—			—	—	0	Advanced
Monica & Wagner						0	—			—	—	0	Advanced

=== Week 2 ===
Week 1 – Men

- Style: Disco

Artistic judges			Technical judges		Skype judge (Tiebreaker)
1	2	3	4	5	Skype judge (Tiebreaker)
Amanda Brandão	Ancelmo Gois	Ana Maria Braga	Renato Vieira	Carlota Portella	Joyce Pascowitch

Running order

Couple	Judges' votes					Jury votes	Combined votes				Week total	Final total	Result
Couple	1	2	3	4	5	Jury votes	A	T	Studio	Skype	Week total	Final total	Result
Guilherme & Leticia						0	—			No tie	—	0	Advanced
Odilon & Roberta		✔		✔		2	—			No tie	—	2	Advanced
MV Bill & Carol	✔		✔		✔	3	—		✔	No tie	—	4	Dance-off
Miguel & Ana Flavia						0	—			No tie	—	0	Advanced
Raphael & Dani						0	—			No tie	—	0	Advanced
Nelson & Carol						0	—			No tie	—	0	Advanced

=== Week 3 ===
Week 2 – Women

- Style: Forró

Artistic judges			Technical judges		Skype judge (Tiebreaker)
1	2	3	4	5	Skype judge (Tiebreaker)
Massimo Ferrari	Mayana Neiva	Malvino Salvador	Maria Pia Finocchio	Carlinhos de Jesus	José Simão

Running order

Couple	Judges' votes					Jury votes	Combined votes				Week total	Final total	Result
Couple	1	2	3	4	5	Jury votes	A	T	Studio	Skype	Week total	Final total	Result
Monica & Wagner						0	—			No tie	—	0	Advanced
Milena & Diego						0	—			No tie	—	0	Advanced
Renata & Rodrigo	✔	✔	✔	✔	✔	5	—			No tie	—	5	Dance-off
Ellen & Marcelo						0	—		✔	No tie	—	1	Advanced
Roberta & Carlos						0	—			No tie	—	0	Advanced

=== Week 4 ===
Week 2 – Men

- Style: Forró

Artistic judges			Technical judges		Skype judge (Tiebreaker)
1	2	3	4	5	Skype judge (Tiebreaker)
Sonia Racy	Diogo Nogueira	Ana Furtado	Jaime Arôxa	Carla Salvagni	Lucas

Running order

Couple	Judges' votes					Jury votes	Combined votes				Week total	Final total	Result
Couple	1	2	3	4	5	Jury votes	A	T	Studio	Skype	Week total	Final total	Result
Raphael & Dani						0	—		✔	No tie	—	1	Advanced
Nelson & Carol						0	—			No tie	—	0	Advanced
Odilon & Roberta	✔	✔				2	—			No tie	—	2	Advanced
Guilherme & Leticia			✔	✔	✔	3	—			No tie	—	0	Dance-off
Miguel & Ana Flavia						0	—			No tie	—	0	Advanced

=== Week 5 ===
Week 3 – Women

- Style: Lambada

Artistic judges			Technical judges		Skype judge (Tiebreaker)
1	2	3	4	5	Skype judge (Tiebreaker)
Felix Fassone	Deborah Secco	Beto Barbosa	Suely Machado	J.C. Violla	Dudu Nobre

Running order

Couple	Judges' votes					Jury votes	Combined votes				Week total	Final total	Result
Couple	1	2	3	4	5	Jury votes	A	T	Studio	Skype	Week total	Final total	Result
Milena & Diego			✔	✔		2	—			No tie	—	2	Advanced
Ellen & Marcelo	✔	✔				2	—		✔	No tie	—	3	Dance-off
Monica & Wagner						0	—			No tie	—	0	Advanced
Roberta & Carlos					✔	1	—			No tie	—	1	Advanced

=== Week 6 ===
Week 3 – Men

- Style: Lambada

Artistic judges			Technical judges		Skype judge (Tiebreaker)
1	2	3	4	5	Skype judge (Tiebreaker)
Carlos Miele	Paloma Bernardi	André Gonçalves	Cláudia Raia	Ciro Barcelos	Christine Fernandes

Running order

Couple	Judges' votes					Jury votes	Combined votes				Week total	Final total	Result
Couple	1	2	3	4	5	Jury votes	A	T	Studio	Skype	Week total	Final total	Result
Odilon & Roberta	✔	✔				2	—		✔	No tie	—	3	Dance-off
Nelson & Carol				✔	✔	2	—			No tie	—	2	Advanced
Raphael & Dani						0	—			No tie	—	0	Advanced
Miguel & Ana Flavia			✔			1	—			No tie	—	1	Advanced

=== Week 7 ===
Dance-off

- Style: Rock

Artistic judges			Technical judges		Skype judge (Tiebreaker)
1	2	3	4	5	Skype judge (Tiebreaker)
Dionísio Chaves	Carolina Ferraz	Carmo Dalla Vecchia	Ana Botafogo	Renato Vieira	Perlla

Running order

Couple	Judges' votes					Jury votes	Combined votes				Week total	Final total	Result
Couple	1	2	3	4	5	Jury votes	A	T	Studio	Skype	Week total	Final total	Result
Ellen & Marcelo						0	—			No tie	—	0	Eliminated
Odilon & Roberta			✔	✔	✔	3	—			No tie	—	3	Advanced
Renata & Rodrigo	✔					1	—			No tie	—	2	Eliminated
MV Bill & Carol		✔				1	—		✔	No tie	—	1	Eliminated
Roberta & Danniel						0	—			No tie	—	0	Eliminated
Guilherme & Leticia	✔	✔	✔	✔	✔	5	—		✔	No tie	—	6	Advanced

=== Week 8 ===
Group 1

- Style: Street

Artistic judges			Technical judges	
1	2	3	4	5
Barbara Fialho	Marcos Paulo	Wanessa Camargo	Octávio Nassur	Hulda Bittencourt

Running order

Couple	Judges' score					Total score	Combined scores				Week total	Final total	Result
Couple	1	2	3	4	5	Total score	A	T	S	V	Week total	Final total	Result
Odilon & Roberta	10	10	10	10	10	50	10	10	8.7	9.1	—	37.8	2nd
Milena & Diego	10	10	10	8	10	48	10	9.0	9.1	9.0	—	37.1	Eliminated
Raphael & Dani	10	8	10	9	10	47	9.3	9.5	9.3	9.2	—	37.3	3rd
Monica & Wagner	10	10	10	10	10	50	10	10	9.7	9.6	—	39.3	1st

=== Week 9 ===
Group 2

- Style: Street

Artistic judges			Technical judges	
1	2	3	4	5
Sheron Menezzes	José Simão	Flávia Alessandra	Edson Guiu	Carlota Portella

Running order

Couple	Judges' score					Total score	Combined scores				Week total	Final total	Result
Couple	1	2	3	4	5	Total score	A	T	S	V	Week total	Final total	Result
Miguel & Ana Flavia	10	10	9	10	10	49	9.7	10	8.6	9.5	—	37.8	2nd
Guilherme & Leticia	10	9	9	9	9	46	9.3	9.0	8.9	8.8	—	36.0	Eliminated
Roberta & Carlos	10	10	10	10	10	50	10	10	9.3	9.3	—	38.6	1st
Nelson & Carol	10	10	10	9	9	48	10	9.0	8.7	9.1	—	36.8	3rd

=== Week 10 ===
Top 6

- Style: Foxtrot

Artistic judges			Technical judges	
1	2	3	4	5
Artur Xexéo	Michella Cruz	Juliano Cazarré	Lourdes Braga	J.C. Violla

Running order

Couple	Judges' score					Total score	Combined scores				Week total	Final total	Result
Couple	1	2	3	4	5	Total score	A	T	S	V	Week total	Final total	Result
Raphael & Dani	8	9	9	8	8	42	8.7	8.0	8.6	8.5	—	33.8	Eliminated
Nelson & Carol	9	10	9	9	9	46	9.3	9.0	9.1	8.8	—	36.2	3rd
Roberta & Carlos	8	9	9	9	9	44	8.7	9.0	8.6	8.0	—	34.3	5th
Miguel & Ana Flavia	10	10	10	10	10	50	10	10	9.4	9.6	—	39.0	1st
Monica & Wagner	9	9	9	9	10	46	9.0	9.5	8.5	8.7	—	35.7	4th
Odilon & Roberta	9	10	9	8	10	46	9.3	9.0	9.4	8.8	—	36.5	2nd

=== Week 11 ===
Top 5

- Style: Salsa

Artistic judges			Technical judges	
1	2	3	4	5
Jonatas Faro	Juliana Paes	Dennis Carvalho	Suely Machado	Ciro Barcelos

Running order

Couple	Judges' score					Total score	Combined scores				Week total	Final total	Result
Couple	1	2	3	4	5	Total score	A	T	S	V	Week total	Final total	Result
Miguel & Ana Flavia	10	10	10	9	10	49	10	9.5	9.0	9.7	38.2	77.2	1st
Monica & Wagner	10	10	9	8	8	45	9.7	8.0	8.9	8.8	35.4	71.1	Eliminated
Odilon & Roberta	10	10	8	9	9	46	9.3	9.0	8.9	8.5	35.7	72.2	3rd
Roberta & Carlos	10	10	10	10	9	49	10	9.5	9.4	8.5	37.4	71.7	4th
Nelson & Carol	10	10	9	10	10	49	9.7	10	9.7	9.0	38.4	74.6	2nd

=== Week 12 ===
Top 4

- Style: Waltz

Artistic judges			Technical judges	
1	2	3	4	5
Ana Gequelin	Dalton Vigh	Bruna Lombardi	Renato Vieira	Fernanda Chamma

Running order

Couple	Judges' score					Total score	Combined scores				Week total	Final total	Result
Couple	1	2	3	4	5	Total score	A	T	S	V	Week total	Final total	Result
Nelson & Carol	10	10	10	10	9	49	10	9.5	9.1	9.1	37.7	112.3	2nd
Roberta & Carlos	10	9	10	9	9	47	9.7	9.0	9.1	8.4	36.2	107.9	Eliminated
Odilon & Roberta	10	10	10	10	9	49	10	9.5	9.3	8.4	37.2	109.4	3rd
Miguel & Ana Flavia	10	10	10	10	10	50	10	10	9.8	9.5	39.3	116.5	1st

=== Week 13 ===
Top 3 – Semifinals

- Style: Tango

Artistic judges			Technical judges	
1	2	3	4	5
Anderson Silva	Adriana Birolli	Leandro Hassum	Ana Botafogo	Junior Cervila

Running order

Couple	Judges' score					Total score	Combined scores				Week total	Final total	Result
Couple	1	2	3	4	5	Total score	A	T	S	V	Week total	Final total	Result
Miguel & Ana Flavia	9	9	10	9	8	45	9.3	8.5	9.4	9.6	36.8	153.3	1st (Finalist)
Nelson & Carol	10	10	10	9	9	48	10	9.0	9.2	8.2	36.4	148.7	2nd (Finalist)
Odilon & Roberta	9	10	10	10	10	49	9.7	10	9.3	8.0	37.0	146.4	Eliminated

=== Week 14 ===
Top 2 – Finals

- Style: Pasodoble & Samba

Artistic judges			Technical judges	
1	2	3	7	8
Massimo Ferrari	Regina Martelli	Artur Xexéo	Carlinhos de Jesus	Fernanda Chamma
4	5	6	9	10
Paolla Oliveira	Rodrigo Lombardi	Fernanda Souza	J.C. Violla	Maria Pia Finocchio

Running order

Pasodoble
Couple	Judges' score					Total score	Combined scores				Dance total	Final total	Result
Couple	1	2	3	4	5	Total score	A	T	S	V	Dance total	Final total	Result
Couple	6	7	8	9	10	Total score	A	T	S	V	Dance total	Final total	Result
Nelson & Carol	10	10	10	10	10	97	10	9.2	9.3	8.8	37.3	—	N/A
Nelson & Carol	10	9	9	10	9	97	10	9.2	9.3	8.8	37.3	—	N/A
Miguel & Ana Flavia	10	10	10	10	10	97	10	9.2	9.3	9.6	38.1	—	N/A
Miguel & Ana Flavia	10	9	9	9	10	97	10	9.2	9.3	9.6	38.1	—	N/A

Samba
Couple	Judges' score					Total score	Combined scores				Dance total	Final total	Result
Couple	1	2	3	4	5	Total score	A	T	S	V	Dance total	Final total	Result
Couple	6	7	8	9	10	Total score	A	T	S	V	Dance total	Final total	Result
Miguel & Ana Flavia	9	10	9	10	10	94	9.5	9.2	9.1	9.9	37.7	75.8	Winner
Miguel & Ana Flavia	9	8	9	10	10	94	9.5	9.2	9.1	9.9	37.7	75.8	Winner
Nelson & Carol	10	10	10	10	10	99	10	9.8	9.0	9.6	38.4	75.7	Runner-up
Nelson & Carol	10	10	10	9	10	99	10	9.8	9.0	9.6	38.4	75.7	Runner-up
