= List of Mandrake episodes =

This is a list of episodes for the Brazilian HBO original series Mandrake. In 2006 and 2008 Mandrake was nominated for an Emmy Award, Drama Series.

As of December 16, 2007, 13 episodes have aired over 2 seasons.

== Season 1 (2005) ==
Title	Nº	Director	Writer	Synopsis	Airdate(s)
A Cidade Não É Aquilo Que Se Vê Do Pão De Açúcar (The City is Not What is Seen from the Sugarloaf)	#1	José Henrique Fonseca	José Henrique Fonseca, Felipe Braga and Tony Bellotto	A Playboy falls for a prostitute and hires Mandrake to negotiate her "release" from the brothel where she works.	October 30, 2005 (HBO)
Dia dos Namorados (Valentine's Day)	#2	Toni Vanzolini	José Henrique Fonseca, Felipe Braga and Tony Bellotto	Mandrake works to resolve the troubles of a love triangle gone wrong.	November 6, 2005 (HBO)
Eva	#3	Arthur Fontes	José Henrique Fonseca, Felipe Braga and Tony Bellotto	Mandrake is hired by a senator who is blackmailed when his mistress turns up dead.	November 13, 2005 (HBO)
Yag	#4	José Henrique Fonseca	José Henrique Fonseca, Felipe Braga and Tony Bellotto	A famous stylist is blackmailed by an anonymous who threatens to expose his eccentric sex life	November 20, 2005 (HBO)
Detetive (Detective)	#5	Carolina Jabor	José Henrique Fonseca, Felipe Braga and Tony Bellotto	N/A	November 27, 2005 (HBO)
Atum Vizcaya (Vizcaya Canned Tuna)	#6	Lula Buarque de Hollanda	José Henrique Fonseca, Felipe Braga and Tony Bellotto	Mandrake intermediates when a rich kid turned drug dealer gets kidnapped for ransom by dirty cops.	December 4, 2005 (HBO)
Kolkata	#7	Cláudio Torres	José Henrique Fonseca, Felipe Braga and Tony Bellotto	A colleague calls Mandrake to handle an emergency in an orgy at a millionaire's mansion involving prominent people.	December 11, 2005 (HBO)
Amparo	#8	Arthur Fontes	José Henrique Fonseca, Felipe Braga and Tony Bellotto	When the ninfomaniac girlfriend of an Argentine pop star vanishes in the city, Mandrake is hired to find the girl.	December 18, 2005 (HBO)

== Season 2 (2007) ==
Title	Nº	Director	Writer	Synopsis	Airdate(s)
Brasília	#9 (2-01)	José Henrique Fonseca	Tony Bellotto	In search of a friend's niece turned call girl that went missing, Mandrake goes to Brasília and investigates a bizarre sect headed by an influential politician.	November 18, 2007 (HBO)
João Santos	#10 (2-02)	José Henrique Fonseca	Claudio Torres	When an old friend of Wexler's gets blackmailed and indicted for corrupting minors, Mandrake investigates and uncovers unsuspected secrets.	November 25, 2007 (HBO)
Rosas Negras (Black Roses)	#11 (2-03)	José Henrique Fonseca	Felipe Braga	Mandrake intervenes when the daughter of an old lover tries to fake a kidnapping but ends up as a real hostage.	December 3, 2007 (HBO)
Lígia	#12 (2-04)	José Henrique Fonseca	Cláudia Tajes	Mandrake stumbles upon an illegal operation when an old lover turned environmentalist asks him to be the legal counsel for a NGO intermediating an "environment-friendly" deal in Brazil.	December 9, 2007 (HBO)
Alma	#13 (2-05)	José Henrique Fonseca	José Henrique Fonseca	Mandrake gets entangled in a dangerous love triangle when the trophy wife of a tycoon asks for help with an affair apparently gone wrong.	December 16, 2007 (HBO)
