= Mandrake (TV series) =

- Official poster.
- Genre: Comedy drama
- Created by: Rubem Fonseca (novel); José Henrique Fonseca
- Starring: Marcos Palmeira; Maria Luiza Mendonça; Luis Carlos Miéle; Marcelo Serrado and Érika Mader
- Theme music composer: Dado Villa-Lobos
- Opening theme: The Work Song
- Composer: Charles Mingus
- Country of origin: Brazil
- Original language: Portuguese
- No. of seasons: 2
- No. of episodes: 13 (list of episodes)

Production
- Executive producer: José Henrique Fonseca
- Producers: Luis Peraza; Pedro Buarque de Hollanda; Leonardo Monteiro de Barros
- Production locations: Rio de Janeiro, Brazil
- Cinematography: Gustavo Hadba; Paulo Souza
- Camera setup: Multi-camera
- Running time: ~50 minutes (no commercials)

Original release
- Network: HBO Latin America
- Release: October 30, 2005 – December 16, 2007

Mandrake is an original series created for the Brazilian branch of the HBO Latin America. The series was produced by HBO's local partner, Conspiração Filmes, with a budget of US$6.5 million. It first aired on October 30, 2005, being broadcast on Sundays at 11 pm (local Brazilian time: UTC -3).

The first ever HBO original series produced in Brazil, Mandrake was adapted from the character created by Brazilian novelist, Rubem Fonseca. Fonseca is known for his analysis of Rio de Janeiro's diverse society in his book A Grande Arte (The Great Art). Fonseca was actively involved in the adaptation of his work for TV, and the general direction of the project was entrusted to his own son, José Henrique Fonseca.

The series was met with great enthusiasm by critics. A second batch of five episodes was produced in mid-2007, and began airing on November 18, 2007. This is expected to complete a 13-episode first season. A second season was, at first, neither confirmed nor denied, with HBO quoted as saying they would be focusing on producing an international series immediately after the Mandrake first season ends. Finally, on May 20, 2007, HBO announced that it was beginning production of a 5-episode second season of the show

As part of a broader plan of distribution, the episodes were immediately dubbed in Spanish, so that HBO could distribute the show to its other Latin American branches.

== Overview ==
The series focuses on the character of Mandrake, a criminal lawyer from Rio de Janeiro played by Marcos Palmeira. His line of work consists mainly of helping wealthy individuals who are facing trouble with the shadier elements of the local society (such as rich men who may be being blackmailed by corrupt cops). Mandrake's job is to act as a go-between Rio's subculture and his clients.

He works out of a small, but highly respected, practice, where he has a partner, seventy-year-old Wexler, a Jewish lawyer who was Mandrake's late father's associate in the same practice. In it, Wexler is responsible for the Civil cases, whereas Mandrake (as was his father before him) is responsible for the Criminal ones. Completely honest, Wexler often scolds Mandrake, who he treats like his own son, for his unorthodox and sometimes not completely honest dealings and methods.

Mandrake is also a womanizer, often dating two women at once and having numerous one-night stands. Other than women, his other confessed addictions are Cuban cigars and Portuguese wines.

The episodes are punctuated by narrations in off by Mandrake, where he ponders about the many aspects of human nature and life in modern society. Besides that, he also has informal discussions about life in general with some colleagues at a local bar, named Bar do Zé.

=== Funding ===
The funding for Mandrake was made possible by a program by the Brazilian government geared towards fomenting a domestic audiovisual production industry. Legislation ruling the media sector requires all paid TV networks to deposit an amount equal to 3% of any funds to be sent abroad into a holding account. This account, which became known as Condecine, cannot be accessed by the network except if to fund domestic audiovisual projects. If the given network does not use it within a certain period of time, than the amount deposited in the given period would go to the national fund for financing the arts.

=== Cast and characters ===
- Paulo Mandrake (Marcos Palmeira): The title character, he is a brilliant Criminal lawyer. His main line of work is dealing with the characters from Rio de Janeiro's underworld on behalf of his clients: wealthy people, or high middle class people, who find themselves entangled with this parallel reality.
- Léon Wexler (Luis Carlos Miéle): Mandrake's associate (and former associate of Mandrake's father). He plays the moral counterpart to Mandrake's unorthodox approach to his profession. Occasionally assists with the troubles Mandrake gets himself into.
- Raul (Marcelo Serrado): Mandrake's childhood friend who joined the Force and is now a police officer. He provides Mandrake with the "inside scoop", and often slips him privileged information that helps Mandrake win his cases.
- Bebel (Érika Mader): Mandrake's considerably younger, "regular" lover.
- Berta (Maria Luiza Mendonça): The "official girlfriend", she is always suspecting Mandrake's indiscretions, and often calls him on little lies he tells her. Seems willing to put up with a lot in order to prolong the relationship.
- Junior (Marcelo Adnet): The new intern in Mandrake's office, he aspires to emulate Mandrake, but is an utter failure with women.
- Verônica (Virgínia Cavendish): Mandrake's new secretary, she is a former Pentecostal Charismatic that starts to explore her sexuality with a little help from her employer.

== Episodes ==
Season	Ep #	First Airdate	Last Airdate
Season 1	8	October 30, 2005	December 18, 2005
Season 2	5	November 18, 2007	December 16, 2007

== Guest spots ==
Several Brazilian actors and celebrities have played guest roles in the series:

- A Cidade Não É O Que Se Vê Do Pão de Açúcar (The City is Not What is Seen from the Sugarloaf):
  - Alexandre Frota (former male model, actor): plays the pimp Célio
  - Daniel Dantas: plays the playboy, "Baby Machado"
  - Suzana Alves (also known as "Tiazinha" — entertainer): plays the prostitute "Linda"
  - Otto (singer): plays Orlandinho
- Dia dos Namorados (Valentine's Day):
  - Bianca Soares (model): plays the transsexual "Viveca"
  - Jean Pierre Noher (Argentine actor): plays the businessman J.J. Soares
  - Ítalo Rossi (veteran actor): plays "Dr. Graff"
  - Castrinho (veteran entertainer and actor): plays "Saldanha"
  - Juliana Galvão (model): plays "Leilane"
  - Alexia Deschamps (actress): plays "Gilda"
  - Lavínia Vlasak (former model, actress): plays "Alexia"
- Kolkata:
  - Cecil Thiré (veteran actor): plays the millionaire and bon-vivant "Julinho Pedrosa"
  - Rodolfo Bottino (veteran actor and amateur cook): plays Chef "Enzo Fortuna"
  - Evandro Mesquita (singer and actor): plays the Kama Sutra guru "Javi Kolkata"
- Brasília:
  - Antônio Grassi (veteran actor): plays a retired cop who couldn't handle the stress at work and turned into a radical vegan and doomsday believer.
- Rosas Negras:
  - Bruna Lombardi (former model, actress): plays "Lena", the older woman who was Mandrake's first love.
  - Tamara Taxman (veteran actress): plays the owner of a flower shop, one of the few that sell black roses.
