= O Advogado de Deus =

- Theatrical release poster
- Directed by: Wagner de Assis
- Written by: Wagner de Assis
- Based on: O advogado de Deus by Zíbia Gasparetto
- Starring: Nicolas Prattes; Danilo Mesquita; Lorena Comparato; Lucas Leto; Beth Goulart; Augusto Madeira
- Production company: Cinética Filmes
- Distributed by: Sony Pictures International Productions
- Release date: 16 April 2026
- Running time: 117 minutes
- Country: Brazil
- Language: Portuguese

O Advogado de Deus is a 2026 Brazilian thriller drama film directed and written by Wagner de Assis. Based on the book The Lawyer of God by the Spiritist medium Zíbia Gasparetto, the film revolves around a newly graduated lawyer who faces a case that connects him to past lives and leads him to a spiritual transformation. The film was produced by Cinética Filmes and distributed by Sony Pictures International Productions.

== Plot ==
The narrative follows Daniel, a young, recently graduated lawyer of idealistic disposition, who is in conflict with his father, the federal deputy Antônio. Alongside his partner Rubinho, Daniel undertakes the defense of Alberto in a case involving a patrimonial dispute. The case, however, reveals connections to events that occurred more than a century ago, involving crimes of passion and intertwined familial relationships. Daniel begins to experience recurring dreams that indicate the influence of past existences upon the present, especially by reason of a love triangle involving Lídia, in whom Alberto takes an interest. Maria Júlia Camargo, Lídia's mother, and the spirit of the businessman Antônio Camargo also form part of the narrative. The plot develops from Daniel's need to reconcile the legal order with principles of a spiritual nature, a process that leads him to a personal transformation and to the possibility of breaking cycles of conflict originating in past lives.

== Cast ==
- Nicolas Prattes as Daniel
- Lucas Leto as Rubinho
- Danilo Mesquita as Alberto
- Lorena Comparato as Lídia
- Letícia Braga as Lanira
- Beth Goulart as Maria Júlia Camargo
- Augusto Madeira as the Federal Deputy Antônio
- Eucir de Souza as José Luiz Camargo
- Henri Pagnoncelli as Antônio Camargo
- Gisele Fróes as Alice de Almeida
- Helga Nemeczyk as Aunt Josefa

== Reception ==
Ricardo Daehn, writing for Correio Braziliense, described O Advogado de Deus as a film "full of good intentions," while noting that its dramatic structure is "very close to the quality of telenovelas." He characterized the screenplay as marked by "a certain amateurism," with a narrative that is "ornate and poorly structured," and observed the film's use of highly emotional scenes and extensive exposition. Daehn also highlighted the performances of Henri Pagnoncelli and Beth Goulart, whose work, in his assessment, provides the film with some of its more notable elements.

André Quental Sanchez, writing for the website Vivente Andante, gave O Advogado de Deus a predominantly critical assessment, pointing to problems with acting, editing, mise-en-scène, and narrative coherence. According to Sanchez, the film features "empty dialogue, artificial interactions, and amateurish editing," as well as a narrative characterized by "multiple characters and betrayals." The critic also observed that the production shows "signs of wear" in the formula adopted by Wagner de Assis in films dealing with Spiritist themes and regarded its treatment of elements such as "dreams, past lives, and karma" as superficial. Among the positive aspects, he highlighted the scenes featuring Lucas Leto, whom he considered more comfortable in his role than Nicolas Prattes. In his assessment, the film seeks to convey a religious message but ultimately presents a narrative that is "confusing, overcrowded, and, at times, unnecessary."
