= Além da Ilha =

- Genre: Comedy thriller
- Starring: Paulo Gustavo; Katiuscia Canoro; Monique Alfradique; Letícia Lima; Gabriel Godoy; André Mattos; Guilherme Piva; Paulo Roque; Anderson Lau
- Country of origin: Brazil
- Original language: Portuguese
- No. of seasons: 1
- No. of episodes: 10

Production
- Production companies: Rede Globo; Multishow; Floresta

Original release
- Network: Globoplay
- Release: September 6, 2018

Além da Ilha (transl. Beyond the island) is a Brazilian comedy thriller web television series that premiered on Globoplay on September 6, 2018. Written by Andrea Batitucci and Rosana Hermann, the series is directed by César Rodrigues

== Premise ==
After winning 200 million Brazilian Reals in a lottery bet, Beto (Paulo Gustavo), Guta (Katiúscia Canoro), Sheila (Monique alfradique), Bia (Letícia Lima) and Cardoso (Gabriel Godoy) decide to celebrate the conquest during a boat trip. As none of them know what it takes to navigate, the group ends up lost on a deserted and mysterious island.

== Cast ==
- Paulo Gustavo as Beto
- Katiuscia Canoro as Guta
- Monique Alfradique as Sheila
- Letícia Lima as Bia
- Gabriel Godoy as Cardoso
- André Mattos as Theodoro
- Guilherme Piva as Tobias
- Paulo Roque as Inácio
- Anderson Lau as Kenji Midoriya
