= Maria Eduarda de Carvalho =

Brazilian actress

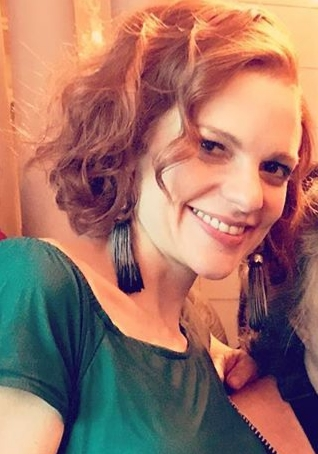
- Carvalho in 2019
- Born: 11 March 1983 (age 42); Rio de Janeiro, Brazil
- Occupation(s): Actress, writer
- Years active: 1996–present
- Spouse: Snir Wine (divorced)
- Children: 1
- Relatives: José Cândido de Carvalho (great-grandfather)

Maria Eduarda de Carvalho (born 11 March 1983) is a Brazilian actress and writer.

== Selected filmography ==
Television

- 2007 – Paraíso Tropical – Odete
- 2008 – Três Irmãs – Carminha
- 2009 – Tudo Novo de Novo – Nanda
- 2011 – A Vida da Gente – Fernanda Macedo
- 2012 – Lado a Lado – Eliete
- 2012 – Como Aproveitar o Fim do Mundo – Silvia
- 2014 – Em Família – Vanessa
- 2015 – Sete Vidas – Laila Thompson
- 2018 – O Tempo Não Para – Miss Celine
- 2019 – Éramos Seis – Olga Amaral Marcondes de Bueno
- 2020 – Salve-se Quem Puder – Herself
- 2022 – Cara e Coragem – Andrea Pratini
- 2024 – Garota do Momento – Teresa Honório
