= De Pernas pro Ar 2 =

2012 film by Roberto Santucci

- Theatrical release poster
- Directed by: Roberto Santucci
- Written by: Mariza Leão
- Starring: Ingrid Guimarães; Bruno Garcia; Maria Paula; Eriberto Leão; Denise Weinberg; Cristina Pereira; Christine Fernandes
- Cinematography: Nonato Estrela
- Production companies: Downtown Filmes; Globo Filmes
- Distributed by: Paris Filmes
- Release date: December 28, 2012 (Brazil)
- Running time: 115 minutes
- Country: Brazil
- Languages: Portuguese; English
- Budget: R$ 6 million
- Box office: $25,402,893

De Pernas pro Ar 2 (transl. Legs In The Air 2) is a 2012 Brazilian comedy film, directed by Roberto Santucci and written by Mariza Leão. It is a sequel of the 2010 film De Pernas pro Ar, starring Ingrid Guimarães, Bruno Garcia, Maria Paula, Eriberto Leão, Denise Weinberg, Cristina Pereira and Christine Fernandes.

It was the first film broadcast via satellite to movie theaters in Brazil. On December 20, 2012, the film was broadcast simultaneously in two special sessions for special guests: one at the Cine Carioca in Rio de Janeiro, and another at the Cine Roxy, in Santos.

== Plot ==
Alice (Ingrid Guimarães) becomes a successful businesswoman, without leaving aside the sexual pleasure, she also continues to work much more. She's quite busy due to the opening of the first branch of her sex shop in New York City, alongside partner Marcela (Maria Paula). Her big goal is to bring to America an unreleased erotic product, which causes her to be quite stressed.

During the celebration for the 100th SexDelícia store in Brazil, Alice has an outbreak due to overwork. She is hospitalized at a spa operated by the rigid Regina (Alice Borges), where she meets several people who seek to control their obsessions and anxieties.

== Cast ==
- Ingrid Guimarães as Alice Segretto
- Bruno Garcia as João
- Maria Paula Fidalgo as Marcela
- Tatá Werneck as Juliana Tavares
- Eriberto Leão as Ricardo
- Denise Weinberg as Marion
- Cristina Pereira as Rosa
- Christine Fernandes as Vitória Prattes
- Eduardo Melo as Paulinho
- Alice Borges as Regina
- Luís Miranda as Mano Love
- Pia Manfroni as Valéria
- Wagner Santisteban as Leozinho
- Rodrigo Sant'Anna as Garçom Geraldo
- Edmilson Barros as Peão
- Dudu Sandroni as Dr. Rafael
