= Dança dos Famosos season 7 =

Dança dos Famosos
- Season 7
- Celebrity winner: Fernanda Souza
- Professional winner: Alexandre Porcel
- No. of episodes: 16

Release
- Original network: Globo
- Original release: April 11 – July 25, 2010

Season chronology
- ← Previous; Season 6 Next → Season 8

Dança dos Famosos 2010 was the seventh season of the Brazilian reality television show Dança dos Famosos which premiered on April 11, 2010 with the competitive live shows beginning on the following week on April 18, 2010 at 7:30 p.m./6:30 p.m. (BRT/AMT) on Rede Globo.

Twelve celebrities were paired with twelve professional ballroom dancers. The celebrities did not know their professional partners until they were introduced to each other at the launch show.

Journalist Adriana Colin, who was fired by the show's producers did not return as co-hostess for this season. Faustão announced that his new co-hostess would be journalist Thalita Morette in December 2009.

Actress Fernanda Souza won the competition over actress Sheron Menezzes.

== Overview ==
- The season follows the same rules from the sixth season. However, the wild card round feature the first six couples eliminated instead of the four. Surprisingly, two couples (instead of one) were brought back into the competition.
- For the first time in the series, the eight remaining couples were split again into two new groups, with two male and female celebrity couples each. Each celebrity would dancing on their respective group's night.
- The final round (merge) would only come on week 10, where the final six couples danced together for the first time at the same night.

== Couples ==
Celebrity	Known for	Professional	Status
Diogo Nogueira; Returned on May 30	Samba singer	Aretha Melo	Eliminated 1st on April 18, 2010
Letícia Birkheuer; Returned on May 30	Model	Edson Modesto	Eliminated 2nd on April 25, 2010
Paulo Zulu	Model	Fernanda d'Ávila	Eliminated 3rd on May 2, 2010
Wanderléa	Singer	João Biasoto	Eliminated 4th on May 9, 2010
Marcelinho Carioca	Former football player	Carol Vieira	Eliminated 5th on May 16, 2010
Christine Fernandes	Actress	Gustavo Malheiros	Eliminated 6th on May 23, 2010
Stênio Garcia	Actor	Daiane Amêndola	Eliminated 7th on June 6, 2010
Ana Maria Braga	Mais Você host	Renato Jóia	Eliminated 8th on June 13, 2010
Diogo Nogueira	Samba singer	Aretha Melo	Eliminated 9th on June 20, 2010
Letícia Birkheuer	Model	Edson Modesto	Eliminated 10th on June 27, 2010
Bruno de Luca	Vídeo Show reporter	Fernanda Ricciopo; Leticia Weiss (Weeks 9–13)	Eliminated 11th on July 4, 2010
André Arteche	Actor	Aline Alves; Nana Nassif (Weeks 10–14)	Eliminated 12th on July 11, 2010
Sheron Menezzes	Actress	Marcelo Granjeiro	Runners-Up on July 25, 2010
Fernanda Souza	Actress	Alexandre Porcel	Winners on July 25, 2010

== Scoring chart ==
Lowest score	Highest score	Eliminated	Bottom two	Wild card	Runner-up	Winners

Team	Place	1	2	3	4	5	6	7	8	9	10	11	12	13	14
Fernanda & Alexandre	1	—	0/5	—	1/5	—	0/5	—	—	47	50	48	50	50	290
Sheron & Marcelo	2	—	1/5	—	0/5	—	0/5	—	50	—	48	50	48	47	287
Andre & Nana	3	1/5	—	0/5	—	0/5	—	—	48	—	48	48	50	45	
Bruno & Leticia	4	0/5	—	2/5	—	2/5	—	—	—	44	48	50	46		
Leticia & Edson	5	—	3/5					5/10	45	—	48	46			
Diogo & Aretha	6	2/5						2/10	—	47	43				
Ana Maria & Renato	7	—	0/5	—	0/5	—	1/5	—	—	44					
Stênio & Daiane	8	2/5	—	0/5	—	0/5	—	—	46						
Christine & Gustavo	9	—	0/5	—	1/5	—	4/5	1/10							
Marcelinho & Carol	10	0/5	—	0/5	—	3/5		1/10							
Wanderlea & João	11	—	0/5	—	3/5			1/10							
Paulo & Fernanda	12	0/5	—	3/5				0/10							

== Average Chart ==
Couples who did not get on the scores stage are listed in order of placement.

Rank	Place	Couple	Total points earned	Total points possible	Average
1	1	Fernanda & Alexandre	535	550	48.6
2	2	Sheron & Marcelo	530	550	48.2
3	3	André & Nana	239	250	47.8
4	4	Bruno & Leticia	188	200	47.0
5	5	Leticia & Edson	139	150	46.3
6	8	Stênio & Daiane	46	50	46.0
7	6	Diogo & Aretha	90	100	45.0
8	7	Ana Maria & Renato	44	50	44.0
9	9	Christine & Gustavo	—	—	—
10	10	Marcelinho & Carol	—	—	—
11	11	Wanderléa & João	—	—	—
12	12	Paulo & Fernanda	—	—	—

== Weekly results ==
=== Week 1 ===
Presentation of the Celebrities

Aired: April 11, 2010

=== Week 2 ===
Week 1 – Men

- Style: Disco

Aired: April 18, 2010

=== Week 3 ===
Week 1 – Women

- Style: Disco

Aired: April 25, 2010

=== Week 4 ===
Week 2 – Men

- Style: Forró

Aired: May 2, 2010

=== Week 5 ===
Week 2 – Women

- Style: Forró

Aired: May 9, 2010

=== Week 6 ===
Week 3 – Men

- Style: Lambada

Aired: May 16, 2010

=== Week 7 ===
Week 3 – Women

- Style: Lambada

Aired: May 23, 2010

=== Week 8 ===
Repechage

- Style: Foxtrot

Aired: May 30, 2010

=== Week 9 ===
Team A

- Style: Salsa

Aired: June 6, 2010

=== Week 10 ===
Team B

- Style: Salsa

Aired: June 13, 2010

=== Week 11 ===
Top 6

- Style: Country

Aired: June 20, 2010

=== Week 12 ===
Top 5

- Style: Rock and Roll

Aired: June 27, 2010

=== Week 13 ===
Top 4

- Style: Gypsy

Aired: July 4, 2010

=== Week 14 ===
Top 3

- Style: Waltz

Aired: July 11, 2010

=== Week 15 ===
Top 2 – Week 1

- Style: Street Dance & Tango

Aired: July 18, 2010

=== Week 16 ===
Top 2 – Week 2

- Style: Paso Doble & Samba

Aired: July 25, 2010
