= Dança dos Famosos season 6 =

Dança dos Famosos
- Season 6
- Celebrity winner: Paola Oliveira
- Professional winner: Átila Amaral
- No. of episodes: 11

Release
- Original network: Rede Globo
- Original release: April 19 – June 28, 2009

Season chronology
- ← Previous; Season 5 Next → Season 7

Dança dos Famosos 6, also taglined as Dança dos Famosos 2009 is the sixth season of the Brazilian reality television show Dança dos Famosos which premiered April 19, 2009, with the competitive live shows beginning on the following week on April 26, 2009, on the Rede Globo television network.

Ten celebrities were paired with ten professional ballroom dancers. The celebrities did not know their professional partners until they were introduced to each other at the launch show. Fausto Silva and Adriana Colin were the hosts for this season. This was Adriana Colin's last season as co-hostess.

Actress Paolla Oliveira won the competition over Zorra Total comedian Leandro Hassum and Malhação cast member Jonatas Faro.

== Overview ==
- The season follows the same split-by-gender style from the last couple of seasons. However, with new rules for that round. The five judges voted on a couple to be eliminated. The couple with the most votes would be sent home.
- On the wild card round, the first four couples eliminated returned danced. The couple with the highest number of public votes would be brought back into the competition. The winners were Katiuscia & Mauro with 61% of the vote.
- The final round began on week 8, where the final seven couples danced together at the same night. For the first time, the finals featured a final three rather than a final two.

== Couples ==
Celebrity	Notability (known for)	Professional	Status
Helô Pinheiro	The Girl from Ipanema	Rodrigo Delano	Eliminated 1st on April 26, 2009
Reginaldo Rossi	Singer	Aretha Melo	Eliminated 2nd on May 3, 2009
Katiuscia Canoro	Zorra Total comedian	Mauro Fernandes	Eliminated 3rd on May 10, 2009
Vampeta	Former football player	Sabrina Cabral	Eliminated 4th on May 17, 2009
Rosamaria Murtinho	Actress	Henrique Mariano	Eliminated 5th on May 31, 2009
Katiuscia Canoro	Zorra Total comedian	Mauro Fernandes	Eliminated 6th on June 7, 2009
Emanuelle Araújo	Singer & actress	Marcelo Chocolate	Eliminated 7th on June 14, 2009
Ricardo Pereira	Actor	Ana Flávia Simões	Eliminated 8th on June 21, 2009
Jonatas Faro	Malhação cast member	Priscila Maris	Third place on June 28, 2009
Leandro Hassum	Zorra Total comedian	Tamara Fuchs	Runner-up on June 28, 2009
Paolla Oliveira	Actress	Átila Amaral	Winner on June 28, 2009

== Elimination chart ==
Couple	Place	1	2	3	4	5	6	7	8	9	10
Paolla & Átila	1	0/5	—	1/5	—	—	49	50	49	50	48+50=98
Leandro & Tamara	2	—	0/5	—	0/5	—	50	49	44	48	45+49=94
Jonatas & Priscila	3	—	0/5	—	0/5	—	48	48	47	46	49+45=94
Ricardo & Ana Flávia	4	—	0/5	—	0/5	—	49	44	45	46	
Emanuelle & Chocolate	5	0/5	—	0/5	—	—	48	49	46		
Katiuscia & Mauro	6	0/5	—	4/5		61	45	44			
Rosamaria & Henrique	7	0/5	—	0/5	—	—	45				
Vampeta & Sabrina	8	—	1/5	—	5/5						
Reginaldo & Aretha	9	—	4/5								
Helô & Rodrigo	10	5/5									

Key
Lowest score
Highest score
Eliminated
Bottom two
Dance-off
Third place
Runner-up
Winner

== Weekly results ==
=== Week 1 ===
Presentation of the Celebrities

Aired: April 19, 2009

=== Week 2 ===
Week 1 – Women

- Style: Disco

Aired: April 26, 2009

=== Week 3 ===
Week 1 – Men

- Style: Disco

Aired: May 3, 2009

=== Week 4 ===
Week 2 – Women

- Style: Forró

Aired: May 10, 2009

=== Week 5 ===
Week 2 – Men

- Style: Forró

Aired: May 17, 2009

=== Week 6 ===
Repechage

- Style: Rock and Roll

Aired: May 24, 2009

=== Week 7 ===
Top 7

- Style: Country

Aired: May 31, 2009

=== Week 8 ===
Top 6

- Style: Salsa

Aired: June 7, 2009

=== Week 9 ===
Top 5

- Style: Indian Dance

Aired: June 14, 2009

=== Week 10 ===
Top 4

- Style: Waltz

Aired: June 21, 2009

=== Week 11 ===
Top 3

- Style: Samba & Tango

Aired: June 28, 2009
