= Éramos Seis (2019 TV series) =

- Also known as: Once We Were Six
- Genre: Telenovela
- Created by: Ângela Chaves
- Based on: Éramos Seis by Maria José Dupré
- Written by: Bernardo Guilherme; Daisy Chaves; Juliana Peres
- Directed by: Pedro Peregrino; Carlos Araújo
- Starring: Glória Pires; Danilo Mesquita; Nicolas Prattes; Giullia Buscacio; André Luiz Frambach; Cássio Gabus Mendes; Simone Spoladore; Ricardo Pereira; Joana de Verona; Carol Macedo; Paulo Rocha; Rayssa Bratillieri; Susana Vieira; Maria Eduarda de Carvalho; Eduardo Sterblitch
- Opening theme: "Éramos Seis" by Victor Pozas & Rafael Langoni Smith
- Country of origin: Brazil
- Original language: Portuguese
- No. of episodes: 154 (50 International version)

Production
- Camera setup: Multi-camera
- Running time: 45 minutes
- Production company: Estúdios Globo

Original release
- Network: TV Globo
- Release: 30 September 2019 – 27 March 2020

Éramos Seis (English: Once We Were Six) is a Brazilian telenovela produced and broadcast by TV Globo. It premiered on 30 September 2019, replacing Órfãos da Terra, and ended on 27 March 2020. It is based on the book of the same name written by Maria José Dupré. The series is adapted by Ângela Chaves, with the collaboration of Bernardo Guilherme, Daisy Chaves and Juliana Peres.

It stars Glória Pires, Nicolas Prattes, Danilo Mesquita, Giullia Buscacio, André Luiz Frambach, Simone Spoladore, Ricardo Pereira and Cássio Gabus Mendes in the main roles.

== Plot ==
The story tells the life of a middle-class family from São Paulo between the 1920s and 1940s. Lola (Glória Pires) is a kind woman dedicated to her family, is married to Júlio (Antonio Calloni), who aspires to be rich and was indebted to finance a house on Avenida Angélica, in São Paulo; they have four children together. The studious Carlos (Danilo Mesquita) is the pride of the family, but has a troubled romance with Inês (Carol Macedo), whose mother is against the relationship. Alfredo (Nicolas Prattes) lives in conflict with his parents for his rebellious and riotous way, in addition to hating his older brother out of jealousy. The spoiled Isabel (Giullia Buscacio) shocks everyone when she gets involved with Felício (Paulo Rocha), a much older man. Julinho (André Luiz Frambach) dates Lili (Triz Pariz), but aims to rise socially, seeing this opportunity in the romance with Soraia (Rayssa Bratillieri), daughter of the rich Assad (Werner Schünemann), his father's boss. After her husband's premature death, Lola starts selling homemade sweets to support her family.

Lola's paternal aunt, Emília (Susana Vieira), is a bitter and millionaire widow who has never helped her family and lives taking care of her daughter, Justina (Julia Stockler), who has mental problems and cannot leave the house for this reason. Emilia sent her younger daughter, Adelaide (Joana de Verona), to Switzerland as a child, but she returns as an adult and conflicts with her mother over feminist ideas and the insistence that her sister should not be deprived of social life, in addition to being sexually open-minded and gets involved with her cousin Alfredo. The rest of Lola's family lives in Itapetininga: her mother Maria (Denise Weinberg), maternal aunt Candoca (Camila Amado) and sisters Clotilde (Simone Spoladore) and Olga (Maria Eduarda de Carvalho). Clotilde lives unhappily away from Almeida (Ricardo Pereira), with whom she broke up after discovering that he was divorced, for fear of judgment, although she hopes to take the courage to live love. Olga dreamed of becoming a member of high society, but she decided to marry her great love, Zeca (Eduardo Sterblitch), even though he is a humble pharmacist, articulating for her aunt Emília to hire him to take care of her business, thus being well paid and giving herself a good life.

Shirley (Barbara Reis) has always believed that she was abandoned while pregnant in her teens by João Aranha (Caco Ciocler), unaware that everything was a plan by his mother, and when she reunites with him more than ten years later, she discovers the truth. However, she is already married to Afonso (Cássio Gabus Mendes), who cares for their daughter, Inês, causing her to be torn between the love of the two, since Aranha starts to show himself as a possessive and different man from youth. Lola's best friend is the gossip Genu (Kelzy Ecard), married to the submissive Virgulino (Kiko Mascarenhas), with whom she has two children: Lili and Lúcio (Jhona Burjack), in love with Isabel.

== Cast ==
- Glória Pires as Eleonora "Lola" Amaral de Lemos
- Danilo Mesquita as Carlos Abílio de Lemos
- Nicolas Prattes as Alfredo Abílio de Lemos
- Giullia Buscacio as Isabel Abílio de Lemos
- André Luiz Frambach as Júlio "Julinho" Abílio de Lemos Filho
- Cássio Gabus Mendes as Afonso dos Santos Oliveira
- Simone Spoladore as Clotilde Amaral
- Ricardo Pereira as Argemiro de Almeida
- Joana de Verona as Adelaide Amaral Sampaio
- Carol Macedo as Inês Ferreira dos Santos
- Paulo Rocha as Felício de Souza
- Rayssa Bratillieri as Soraia Assad
- Susana Vieira as Emília Amaral Sampaio
- Maria Eduarda de Carvalho as Olga Amaral Marcondes de Bueno
- Eduardo Sterblitch as José Carlos "Zeca" Marcondes de Bueno
- Julia Stockler as Justina Amaral Sampaio
- Bárbara Reis as Shirley Ferreira
- Nicola Siri as Osório Tavares
- Marcela Jacobina as Natália Tellman
- Triz Pariz as Maria Lídia "Lili" Coutinho
- Jhona Burjack as Lúcio Coutinho
- Kelzy Ecard as Genuína "Genu" Coutinho
- Kiko Mascarenhas as Virgulino Coutinho
- Werner Schünemann as Jorge Assad
- Mayana Neiva as Karine Fagundes Assad
- Virgínia Rosa as Durvalina "Durva" da Silva
- Camila Amado as Cândida Amaral "Tia Candoca"
- Denise Weinberg as Maria Amaral
- Stepan Nercessian as Delegado Gusmões
- Brenno Leone as Elias Al-Fashi
- Izak Dahora as Sebastião "Tião"
- Guilherme Ferraz as Marcelo Gomes de Souza e Silva
- Thiago Justino as Higino
- Nilson Nunes as Alaor
- Caroline Verban as Hermengarda / Nely
- Duda Batista as Emily Amaral Marcondes de Bueno
- Marjorie Queiroz as Emiliana Amaral Marcondes de Bueno
- André Cidade as Otávio "Tavinho" Amaral Marcondes de Bueno
- Noha Hamdan as Rita Almeida
- João Vitor Manhães as Ernesto Almeida

=== Guest cast ===
- Antônio Calloni as Júlio Abílio de Lemos
- Caco Ciocler as João Aranha
- Luciana Braga as Zulmira de Souza
- Irene Ravache as Tereza
- Nicette Bruno as Madre Joana
- Marcos Caruso as Prefeito Moysés
- Wagner Santisteban as Marcos
- Walderez de Barros as Marlene de Lemos
- Othon Bastos as Padre Venâncio
- Emiliano Queiroz as Seu Isidoro
- Lavínia Pannunzio as Lucy Assad
- Ellen Rocche as Marion
- Daniel Boaventura as Adoniran
- Aline Borges as Drª. Selma Telles
- Giselle Batista as Antonieta Piedade
- Cláudia Ventura as Profª. Benedita
- Roberto Frota as Dr. Vicente
- Joelson Medeiros as Ismael
- Luca de Castro as Dr. Evaristo
- Gillray Coutinho as Sinval
- Camilo Bevilacqua as Simão
- Paulo Carvalho as Mr. Hilton
- Eunice Bráulio as Carola
- Carla Nunes as Mabel Chagas
- Isaac Bernat as Josias Chagas
- Breno Nina as Ricardo Neves
- Beatriz Campos as Leontina Neves
- Raphaela Moraes as Rosaura Almeida
- Simon Petracchi as Hamilton Sampaio
- Nicola Lama as Conde de Franco
- Milton Walley as Calux
- Lucas Domso as Roberto
- Ademir de Souza as Palhaço Sorriso
- Werles Pajero as Sílvio
- Tiago Homci as Dráusio
- Pia Manfroni as Esmeralda
- Maria Mônica Passos as Dona Iracema
- Andrea Bacellar as Madame Bulhões
- Henrique Taxman as Dr. Rubens
- Gustavo Trestini as Tinoco
- Edvard Vasconcelos as Juiz Everaldo
- Bernardo Dugin as Nero
- Silvio Mattos as Sr. Flores
- Marcos Dioli as Clóvis
- Lucas Miranda as Laércio
- Rodrigo Ferrarini as Capitão Alves
- Roberto Lobo as Cassimiro
- Antônio Alves as Sr. Barbosa
- Karla Muniz as Madame Bulcão
- Nísia Rocha as Nena
- Bárbara Vento as Dita
- Gabriela Catai as Greta
- Giovanna Sanches as Doralice
- Luciano Pullig as Matias
- Gabriel Borges as Euclides
- Maitê Motta as Paulete
- Caio Antunes as León Ferreira Coutinho de Lemos
- Lara Gutterres as Cecília Souza Abílio de Lemos
- Clara Tiezzi as Adult Emiliana
- Karize Brum as Adult Emily
- Renan Ribeiro as Adult Tavinho
- Xande Valois as Child Carlos
- Pedro Sol Victorino as Child Alfredo
- Maju Lima as Child Isabel
- Davi de Oliveira as Child Julinho
- Gabriella Saraivah as Child Inês
- Melissa Nóbrega as Child Soraia
- Bruna Negendank as Child Lili
- Arthur Gama as Child Lúcio
- Lipinho Costa as Child Tião

== Soundtrack ==
=== Volume 1 ===
Éramos Seis: Vol. 1

Soundtrack album by Various artists
- Released: 6 December 2019
- Length: 32:18
- Label: Som Livre

Éramos Seis Vol. 1 is the first soundtrack of the telenovela, released on 6 December 2019 by Som Livre.

| No. | Title | Artist(s) | Length |
|---|---|---|---|
| 1. | "Éramos Seis" | Victor Pozas & Rafael Langoni Smith | 1:05 |
| 2. | "Ontem ao Luar" | Rubel | 3:31 |
| 3. | "Um Só Lugar" | Moreno Veloso & Tom Veloso | 3:33 |
| 4. | "Nenhum Amor É Proibido" | João Grillo | 3:31 |
| 5. | "Linda Flor (Ai, Ioiô)" | Fafá de Belém | 1:53 |
| 6. | "Check to Check" | Lucy Alves | 3:42 |
| 7. | "Boogie Woogie Bugle Boy" | Cluster Sisters | 2:35 |
| 8. | "Shall We Dance?" | Daniel Boaventura | 2:33 |
| 9. | "Fruta Boa" | António Zambujo | 4:13 |
| 10. | "Lua Branca" | Maria Bethânia | 2:05 |
| 11. | "Deusa da Minha Rua" | Roberto Carlos | 3:37 |
| Total length: | | | 32:18 |

=== Volume 2 ===
Éramos Seis: Vol. 2

Soundtrack album by Various artists
- Released: 24 January 2020
- Length: 31:51
- Label: Som Livre

Éramos Seis Vol. 2 is the second soundtrack of the telenovela, released on 24 January 2020 by Som Livre.

| No. | Title | Artist(s) | Length |
|---|---|---|---|
| 1. | "Ta-hí (Pra Você Gostar de Mim)" | Fernanda Takai | 2:52 |
| 2. | "Até o Fim" | Arnaldo Antunes | 2:32 |
| 3. | "Não Me Diga Adeus" | Tulipa Ruiz | 2:41 |
| 4. | "Gosto Que Me Enrosco" | Dudu Nobre | 2:50 |
| 5. | "Comportamento Geral" | Ney Matogrosso | 3:18 |
| 6. | "Why Don't You Do It Right" | Peggy Lee | 2:25 |
| 7. | "Uma Andorinha não Faz Verão" | Naiara Azevedo | 2:32 |
| 8. | "El Manisero" | Victor Pozas & Rafael Langoni Smith | 2:41 |
| 9. | "Estrada do Sol" | Carminho & Marisa Monte | 4:04 |
| 10. | "Eu Sonhei que Tu Estavas tão Linda" | Tim Bernardes | 2:25 |
| 11. | "Deusa da Minha Rua" | António Zambujo | 3:31 |
| Total length: | | | 31:51 |

== Ratings ==
| Season | Episodes | First aired | | Last aired | | Avg. viewers (points) |
| Season | Episodes | Date | Viewers (in points) | Date | Viewers (in points) | Avg. viewers (points) |
|---|---|---|---|---|---|---|
| 1 | 154 | 30 September 2019 | 24 | 27 March 2019 | 26 | 20.7 |
