= Spectros =

Brazilian supernatural thriller streaming television series directed by Douglas Petrie

- Genre: Thriller; Supernatural
- Based on: Anderson Almeida, Antônio De Freitas, Michael Ruman
- Directed by: Douglas Petrie
- Starring: Danilo Mesquita; Enzo Barone; Cláudia Okuno; Pedro Carvalho; Mariana Sena
- Country of origin: Brazil
- Original language: Portuguese
- No. of seasons: 1
- No. of episodes: 7

Production
- Executive producers: Roberto D’Avila; Suraia Lenktaitis; Ana Kormanski
- Producers: Robert D'Avila, Douglas Petrie
- Production locations: São Paulo, São Paulo, Brazil
- Cinematography: Uli Burtin, ABC
- Running time: 36 - 60 min
- Production companies: Moonshot Pictures, Great Neck Films

Original release
- Network: Netflix
- Release: 20 February 2020

Spectros is a Brazilian supernatural thriller streaming television series that premiered on Netflix on February 20, 2020. The seven-episode series is run by a writer and a director, Douglas Petrie, and produced by Moonshot Pictures.

According to Doug Petrie, the series is a mix of Brazilian folklore and history, with elements of Japanese ghost tales, represented by the colorful streets of Liberdade district, home to the largest Japanese community outside Japan in the world.

== Plot ==
The show is in the Liberdade district in São Paulo. Spectros tells the story of a group of five teenagers who are accidentally attracted to a supernatural reality that they can not comprehend, and that connects to the same location of the city in 1908. When confronted by increasingly bizarre and gloomy events, the group comes to an inevitable conclusion: someone is bringing the dead back, and the spirits want revenge for the mistakes committed in the past.

== Cast ==
- Danilo Mesquita
- Enzo Barone
- Cláudia Okuno
- Pedro Carvalho
- Mariana Sena

== Episodes ==
No.	Title	Directed by	Written by	Original release date
1	"The Porcelain Doll"	Douglas Petrie	Douglas Petrie	February 20, 2020
2	"The World is Different for Us"	Douglas Petrie	Anderson Almeida	February 20, 2020
3	"My Temple Will Be My Grave"	Maria Farkas	Antônio De Freitas, Paula Knudsen	February 20, 2020
4	"Come to Mamma"	Maria Farkas	Janaína Tokitaka	February 20, 2020
5	"The Dead Have Risen"	Michael Ruman	Douglas Petrie	February 20, 2020
6	"Heal Thyself"	Michael Ruman	Paula Knudsen	February 20, 2020
7	"Block Party"	Part 1: Michael Ruman; Part 2: Douglas Petrie, Maria Farkas	Part 1: Michael Ruman; Part 2: Douglas Petrie	February 20, 2020
