= Airplane Mode (2020 film) =

2020 film directed by César Rodrigues

- Promotional poster
- Portuguese: Modo Avião
- Directed by: César Rodrigues
- Written by: Renato Fagundes; Alice Name-Bomtempo
- Produced by: Luiz Noronha
- Starring: Larissa Manoela; Erasmo Carlos; Katiuscia Canoro; André Frambach; Dani Ornellas; Eike Duarte; Nayobe Nzainab
- Production companies: A Fábrica; Edge Films
- Distributed by: Netflix
- Release date: 23 January 2020
- Running time: 95 minutes
- Country: Brazil
- Language: Portuguese

Airplane Mode (Portuguese: Modo Avião) is a 2020 Brazilian comedy film directed by César Rodrigues from a screenplay by Alberto Bremer and written by Renato Fagundes and Alice Name-Bomtempo. It stars Larissa Manoela, Erasmo Carlos, Katiuscia Canoro, André Frambach and Dani Ornellas. The film was released on 23 January 2020 by Netflix.

== Plot ==
Ana is a fashion design student dreaming of becoming a great stylist, who drops everything to become a digital influencer for a famous brand she works for called True Fashion. She spends time with her boyfriend Gil and lives with her parents. Her boss Carola predicts Ana's future with Gil, but has been scheming their relationship without Ana knowing. During the couple's one-month anniversary dinner date, Gil announces on a livestream that he will be breaking up with Ana, which leads to her having a heated conversation with Carola on the phone during her drive back home. During this, she crashes her car, and she is forced into a digital detox by her parents at her grandpa's farm house as a sentence.

She struggles at first with the experiences with her grandpa Germano, who doesn't know what she has been through. One night she goes to a closed convenience store to get toilet paper, but she is stopped by João, a person who had taken her on the journey, and develops feelings for him.

After an argument formed by Ana and another child between a phone, Ana confronts Germano, telling him that he didn't listen to her. Feeling remorse, Germano then takes her to "the most beautiful view in the world", in which her grandma used to visit. Ana tells Germano about her life and later, he shows her a room she was not allowed to enter before, which contains many memories and pictures of her grandma. This inspires Ana, and she makes a new collection called "Meridiana" a mix of her and her grandma's name.

During her stay, she starts visiting João more often and forms a relationship with him. At a festival they share their first kiss, but a fan tells Ana that after Gil broke up with her, he has been seeing her best friend, Mara. Ana finds a phone and sees the pictures of them dating, and unsuccessfully attempts to drive away in grief.

One day, her parents along with Carola and her assistant Fausto visit her. Carola sees the collection and thinks it is something new to show off to, but unbeknownst to Ana, she secretly takes pictures of it. When they visit the festival, a picture she took with her parents exposes a questionable ad of an actor who implied that he was a prosecutor for Ana's sentence. Disheartened and realizing that she has been living a made-up life, Ana storms out and returns back to the city.

Sometime later, Ana moves into a new apartment block to have a fresh start, and isolates herself from her family, including João. After Ana receives a post sent by him of the True Fashion poster, in which Carola is using Ana's collection for her winter collection, she decides to secretly sneak into the building and try to expose Carola in front of everyone. It successfully works after capturing some footage of Carola lashing out towards Ana. Carola is later arrested and Ana and João reunite and they live a happy life.

== Cast ==
Character	Actor (Brazilian Portuguese)	Voice actors (English Dub)
Ana	Larissa Manoela	Brianna Knickerbocker
Germano	Erasmo Carlos	Doug Stone
Carola	Katiuscia Canoro	Roxanna Ortega
João	André Frambach	Nick Thurston
Inácio	Michel Bercovitch	Devin Henessey
Laura	Sílvia Lourenço	Julie Ann Taylor
Rebeca	Mariana Amâncio	Angie Sarkisyan
Fausto	Phellyx Moura	Dani Ornellas
Julia	Nayobe Nzainab	Daisy Koprowski
Gil	Eike Duarte	Kyle McCarley
Mara	Amanda Orestes	Julia Griswold
Victoria	Helga Nemetik	
Actor	Adriano Fanti	

== Production ==
In April 2019, it was announced during the 2019 Rio2C (Rio Creative Conference) event that Netflix would produce its first Brazilian comedy film starring Larissa Manoela. In July 2019, it was announced that Erasmo Carlos, Katiuscia Canoro, André Frambach and Dani Ornellas had joined the cast of the film.

== Reception ==
The English dub of the film was met with negative reviews, due to its poor quality, bad lipsync, and poor acting skills. John Serba of Decider wrote, "Airplane Mode is sloppy and formulaic, more feelblah than feelgood, and as deep as a puddle on the arid steppes of Patagonia".
