= Zíbia Gasparetto =

Brazilian spiritualist writer (1926–2018)

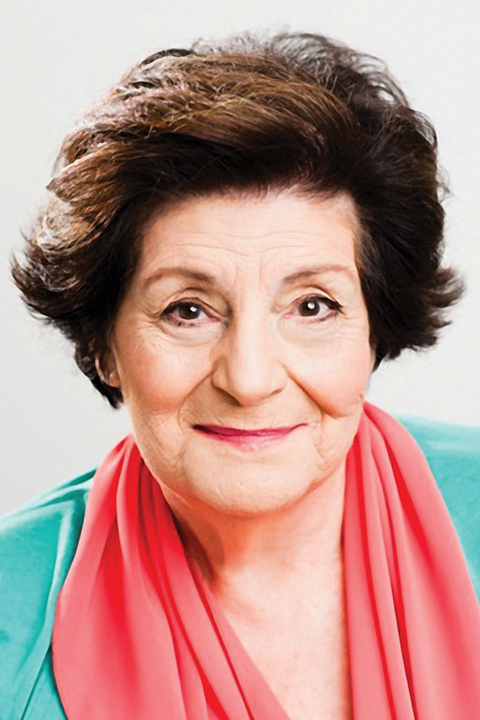
- Born: 29 July 1926; Campinas, Brazil
- Died: 10 October 2018 (aged 92); São Paulo, Brazil
- Occupation: Writer
- Spouse: Aldo Luis Gasparetto
- Writing career
- Language: Portuguese
- Literary movement: Spiritualism

Zíbia Alencastro Gasparetto (29 July 1926 – 10 October 2018) was a Brazilian spiritualist writer. Gasparetto said that some of her books were dictated by a spirit named Lucius.

== Biography ==
Born in Campinas, she married Aldo Luis Gasparetto with whom she had four children. According to her own account, one night in 1950 she woke up and started walking around the house speaking German, a language she did not know. The next day her husband went out and bought a book on spiritism which they then began to study together.

Her husband attended the meetings of the spiritual association Federação Espírita do Estado de São Paulo but Gasparetto had to stay at home to look after the children. Once a week they studied together at home. On one occasion, Gasparetto felt a sharp pain in her arm which moved from side to side uncontrollably. After Aldo gave her a pen and paper, she started to write quickly, drafting what was to become her first novel O Amor Venceu (Love Won) signed by someone called Lucius. After the manuscript had been typed up, Gasparetto showed it to a history professor from the University of São Paulo who was also interested in spiritualism. Two weeks later she received confirmation that the book would be published by Editora LAKE. Gasparetto now says she uses her computer four times a week to write down the texts dictated by her voices.

She usually wrote in the evening for one or two hours. "They [the spirits] are not available to work many days per week," she explains. "I don't know why but each one of them only appears once a week. I tried to get them to change but I couldn't." As a result, she usually kept one evening a week free for each of the four spirits with whom she purportedly communicated. She also published one of the stories dictated by Lucius as an audiobook with the book's characters voiced by actors.

== Death ==
She died on 10 October 2018, in São Paulo, aged 92, from pancreatic cancer.

== Selected works ==
Gaspareeto authored over 30 books (although some are said to be written by spirits), many of them best sellers. A selection is given below:

- 1958: Amor Venceu
- 1975: Entre o Amor e a Guerra
- 1976: Laços Eternos
- 2001: Quando é Preciso Voltar
- 2002: Ninguém é de Ninguém
- 2002: Tudo Tem Seu Preço
- 2003: Tudo Valeu a Pena
- 2004: Um Amor de Verdade
- 2005: Nada é por Acaso
- 2006: Amanhã a Deus Pertence
- 2008: Vencendo o Passado
- 2013: Só o Amor Consegue
