= Katiuscia Canoro =

Brazilian actress

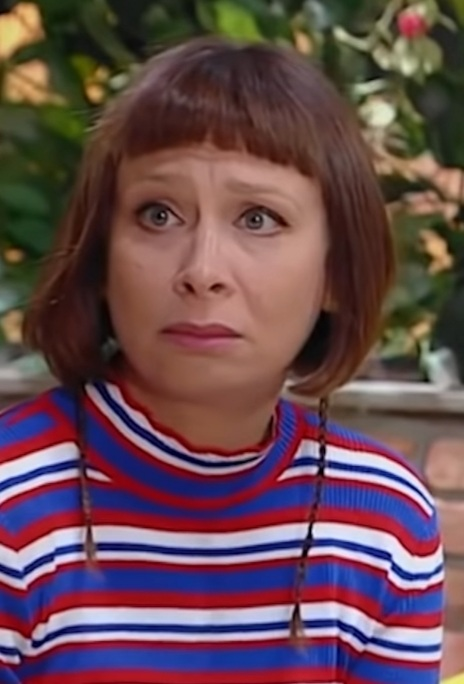
- Canoro in 2019
- Born: 4 December 1978 (age 47); Curitiba, Paraná, Brazil
- Occupation: Actress
- Years active: 1992–present
- Children: 1

Katiuscia Canoro (born 4 December 1978) is a Brazilian actress.

== Filmography ==
=== Television ===
Year	Title	Role	Notes
2008–2015	Zorra Total	Lady Kate / Kate Lúcia / Umbelinda / Beiradinha	
2009	Dança dos Famosos	Contestant	Season 6
2010	Papai Noel Existe	Suellen	End year special
2012	A Grande Família	Kelly Aparecida Pereira	
2014	Didi e o Segredo dos Anjos	Dolores	End year special
2016	Tudo Tudo	Various	Also creator, writer and producer
2017	A Praça é Nossa	Rosauro	Episode: "30 anos de A Praça é Nossa"
2017–2020	A Vila	Violeta	
2018	Além da Ilha	Guta	
2021	5x Comédia	Esther Diaz	Episode: "Hipocondríaco"
2022–present	Vai Que Cola	Sheika Nadja / Sidlayne Boaidera	
2024	Tô Nessa!	Michelle Falls	Episode: "20 October"

=== Film ===
Year	Title	Role	Notes
2004	Vovó Vai Ao Supermercado		Short film
2005	Sem Ana	Photographer	Short film
2005	A Guisa de Orquídeas		Short film
2005	Do Papel Pra Tela		Short film
2012	E Aí... Comeu?	Aninha Tarja Preta	
2015	Inside Out	Sadness	Brazilian Portuguese dubbing
2015	A Esperança é a Última que Morre	Vanessa	
2016	Tô Ryca	Luane	
2018	Sai de Baixo - O Filme	Sunday	
2020	Airplane Mode	Carola	
2022	Tô Ryca 2	Luane	
2022	Vai Dar Nada	Suzi Paiva	
2024	Vidente por Acidente	Coach Sarah	
2024	Inside Out 2	Sadness	Brazilian Portuguese dubbing
2024	O Clube das Mulheres de Negócios	Zarife	

== Theater ==
- Marie - 1992 Direção: Labouret
- O poder da Amizade – 1993 direction: Daniel Arthur
- Amor de Ciclovia – 1992 direction: Lucia Du Arte
- Os Ovos De Pascoa Sumiram – 1994 direction: Lucia Du Arte
- A Bruxinha Que Era Boa – 1995 direction: Carla Almeida
- Festa do Uirapuru – 1995 direction: Daniel Arthur
- A Floresta Sumiu – 1996 direction: Daniel Arthur
- Anjos e Pecados – 1998 direction: Treat
- O Auto Da Compadecida – 1999 direction: Demian Garcia
- Estrada do pecado – 2004 direction: Cesar Almeida
- Medea Material – TCP 2004 direction: Mariana Percovich
- Gatos Musical Rock - 2005 direction: Ronald Lima
- Mulheres de Chico – 2005 direction: Mauricio Vogue
- Panico No Mercado – 2005 direction: Franklin Albuquerque
- Contadores de Historias – 2005 direction: Mauricio Vogue
- O Pentáculo – 2006 direction: Franklin Albuquerque
- CintaLiga - 2006 direction: CIA Das Meninas
- Humor Com Sabor Picante - 2006 direction: Mauricio Vogue
- Memória – TCP teatro Guairá- 2006 direction: Moacir Chaves
- Risorama -2006-FTC
- D.Graça – 2007 teatro Maria Clara Machado RJ direction: cia colapsico
- Macbeth - 2007 direction: Moacir Chaves
- PoutPouRir – 2008 direction: Leandro Goulart e Afra Gomes
