= Paolla Oliveira =

Brazilian actress (born 1982)

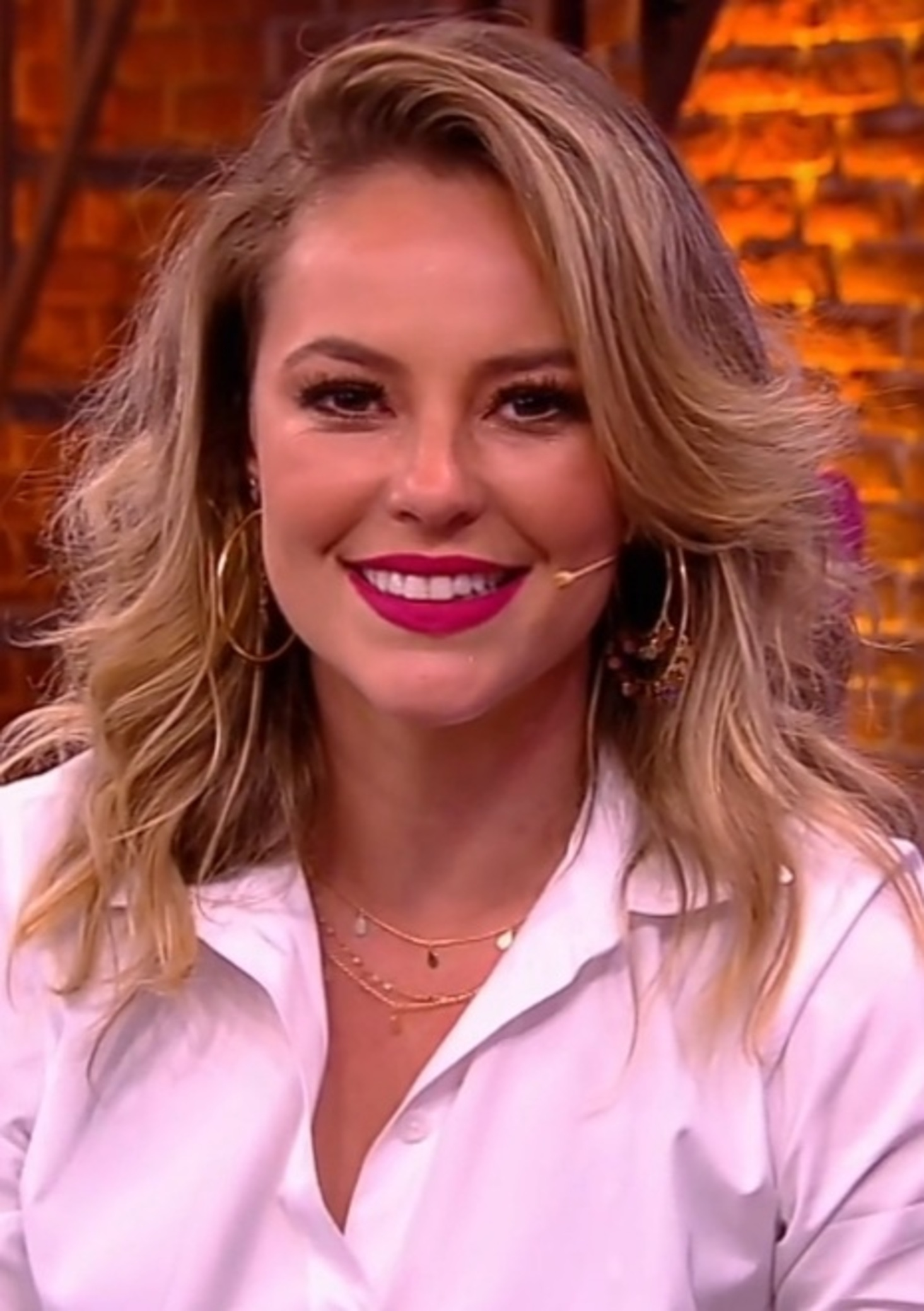
- Oliveira in 2018
- Born: Caroline Paola Oliveira da Silva; 14 April 1982 (age 44); São Paulo, Brazil
- Occupation: Actress
- Years active: 1999–present

Caroline Paola Oliveira da Silva (born 14 April 1982), known professionally as Paolla Oliveira, is a Brazilian actress.

== Biography ==
Oliveira was born in São Paulo. Her father is a retired military policeman while her mother is a housewife. Oliveira started working as a model when she was 16 years old, but she eventually became an actress after finishing studying performing arts at the same time she graduated in physiotherapy at Cruzeiro do Sul University. She is of Portuguese, Italian and Spanish descent.

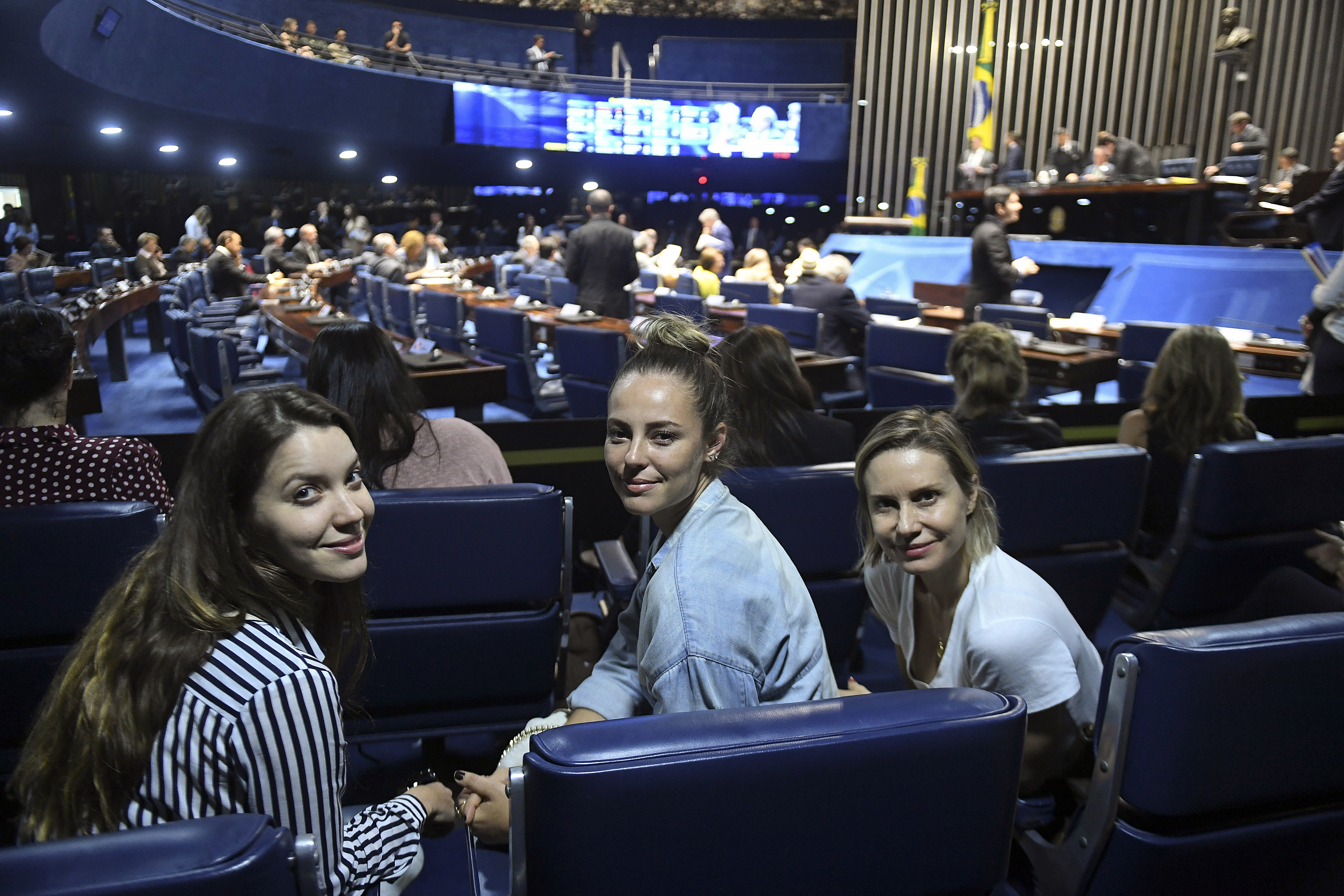
With Nathalia Dill and actress Paula Burlamaqui in 2018

== Career ==
After starring in several television ads, Oliveira participated in the TV Record telenovela Metamorphoses in 2004, and in the following year, she joined the cast of TV Globo telenovela Belíssima, where she played the role of Giovana. Due to her popularity in Belíssima, in 2005, she was invited by the production team of O Profeta to play the lead role of Sônia. In 2007, she played the role of Renata in TV Globo's end of the year special Os Amadores, and in March 2008, she was hired to play the role of tennis player Letícia in Ciranda de Pedra, which is a telenovela set in the 1950s. Her character's inspiration is Brazilian tennis player Maria Esther Bueno. Oliveira starred in the feature film Entre Lençóis. Filming began in May 2008. The film was released on December 5, 2008. On June 28, 2009, Oliveira won the sixth edition of Dança dos Famosos (Brazilian Dancing with the Stars). Her partner was Átila Amaral.

She played the lead role of Marina in Insensato Coração in 2011. Oliveira starred as Paloma in the 2013 Rede Globo telenovela Amor à Vida. She played the villain Melissa in the 2015 telenovela Além do Tempo. Oliveira played the protagonist Jeiza, a police officer and the romantic interest of Marco Pigossi's character, in the 2017 telenovela A Força do Querer.

== Filmography ==
=== Television ===
Year	Title	Role	Notes
1999	Passa ou Repassa	Stage assistant	
2001	Curtindo uma Viagem	Stage assistant	
2004	Metamorphoses	Stela Fontes Taylor	
2005	Malhação	Queen Bee	Episode: "15 September"
2005	Belíssima	Giovana Güney Sabatini	
2006	O Profeta	Sônia Carvalho de Oliveira	Lead role
2007	Os Amadores	Renata	Episode: "21 December"
2008	Faça Sua História	Georgette	Episode: "A Falta Que Ela Me Faz"
2008	Casos e Acasos	Verônica	Episode: "O Papai Noel, a Perna e o Presépio"
2008	Ciranda de Pedra	Letícia Garcia Cassini	Contigo! Awards for Best Co-starring Actress
2009	Cama de Gato	Verônica Tardivo Brandão	Antagonist
2009	Dança dos Famosos	Contestant	Season 6, first place
2010	As Cariocas	Clarissa	Episode: "A Atormentada da Tijuca"
2010	Afinal, o Querem as Mulheres?	Lívia Monteiro	Lead role Contigo! Television Awards for Best Actress in a Series or miniseries
2011	Insensato Coração	Marina Drumond Brandão	Lead role Contigo! Television Awards for Best Actress in a Telenovela
2011	Malhação	Herself	Episode: "5 September"
2012	Tapas & Beijos	Celeste	Episode: "A Prima de Sueli"
2013	Amor à Vida	Paloma Rodriguez Khoury Araújo	Lead role Nominated–Extra de Televisão Award for Best Actress; Nominated–Retrospectiva Award for Best Romantic Couple with Malvino Salvador; Nominated–Melhores do Ano Natelinha Award for Best Actress; Won–Melhores do Ano for Best Actress; Nominated–Troféu Internet Award for Best Actress; Nominated–Minha Novelas Award for Best Actress; Nominated–Contigo Awards for Best Actress
2015	Felizes para Sempre?	Denise / Simone	Lead role Nominated–Melhores do Ano Awards for Best Actress in a Series or Miniseries
2015	Fantástico	Reporter	Segment: "Como Manda o Figurino"
2015	Além do Tempo	Melissa Borghini / Santarém	Antagonist
2015	Mister Brau	Herself	Episode: "8 December"
2016	Haja Coração	Protester	Episode: "8 November"
2017	A Força do Querer	Jeiza Nascimento Rocha	Lead role
2018	Assédio	Carolina Malfatti	
2018	Festeja Brasil	Presenter	End year special
2018	Caldeirão de Ouro	Presenter	End year special
2019	A Dona do Pedaço	Virgínia Ramirez / Virgínia "Vivi" Guedes	
2021	Super Dança dos Famosos	Contestant	Season 18, first place
2022	Cara e Coragem	Patrícia "Pat" Lima	Lead role
2024	Falas Femininas	Presenter	Episode: "Louca"
2024	Encantado's	Valesca Araújo	Episode: ""Delírio Sensual, Arco-Íris De Prazer"
2024	Justiça 2	Jordana Juarez	
2025	Vale Tudo	Helena "Heleninha" Almeida Roitman	

=== Film ===
Year	Title	Role	Notes
2007	Envie aos Palhaços	Olivia	
2007	Noite Fria	María	
2008	Rinha	Pillar	
2008	Entre Lençóis	Paula	Lead role
2009	Budapeste	"Aquela"	
2010	Eu e Meu Guarda-Chuva	Adult Frida	
2011	Uma Professora Muito Maluquinha	Catarina Roque "Cate"	Lead role
2012	Trinta	Zeni Pamplona Penharol	
2014	A Verdadeira História da ROTA	Herself	Documentary
2014	Beauty and the Beast	Belle	Brazilian Portuguese dub, voice role
2014	Para Sempre Teu Caio F.	Herself	Documentary
2015	O Estranho	Woman	Short-film
2016	Em Nome da Lei	Alice	
2017	3000 dias no Bunker		
2017	Real - O Plano Por Trás da História	Renata	
2017	Lino: An Adventure of Seven Lives	Patty	Voice role, original voice
2017	Alguém Como Eu	Helena	
2018	Bumblebee	Shatter	Brazilian Portuguese dub, voice role
2021	Dente por Dente	Joana	
2022	Papai é Pop	Elisa	

=== Music Videos ===
Year	Title	Singer
2015	"Somente Nela"	Paulinho Moska
2018	"Mulher Feita"	Projota
2021	"Flor de Caña"	Diogo Nogueira

== Awards and nominations ==
=== Melhores do Ano ===
Year	Category	Nominated	Result	Ref.
2006	Best Actress Revelation	Belíssima	Nominated	
2013	Best Actress	Amor à Vida	Won	
2015	Best Actress in a Series	Felizes para Sempre?	Won	
2017	Best Actress	A Força do Querer	Won	
2019	Best Supporting Actress	A Dona do Pedaço	Nominated	

=== Prêmio Contigo! de TV ===
Year	Category	Nominated	Result	Ref.
2006	Best Actress Revelation	Belíssima	Nominated	
2007	Best Actress	O Profeta	Won	
2007	Romantic Couple (with Thiago Fragoso)	O Profeta	Won	
2009	Best Supporting Actress	Ciranda de Pedra	Nominated	
2010	Best Actress	Cama de Gato	Nominated	
2011	Best Actress in a Series	After all, what do women want?	Nominated	
2012	Best Actress	Insensato Coração	Nominated	
2015	Best Actress	Felizes para Sempre?	Won	
2017	Best Actress	A Força do Querer	Nominated	
2019	Best Supporting Actress	A Dona do Pedaço	Won	
2019	Romantic Couple (with Sérgio Guizé)	A Dona do Pedaço	Nominated	
2021	Couple of the Year	Paolla and Diogo Nogueira	Nominated	
2022	Telenovela Actress	Cara e Coragem	Won	

=== Quality Award Brazil ===
Year	Category	Nominated	Result	Ref.
2006	Best Actress Revelation	Belíssima	Won	
2011	Best Series or Miniseries Actress	Afinal, o Que Querem as Mulheres?	Nominated	

=== Super Gold Cap Trophy ===
Year	Category	Nominated	Result	Ref.
2008	Best Actress	Ciranda de Pedra	Won	

=== Paulista Association of Art Critics ===
Year	Category	Nominated	Result	Ref.
2017	Best Actress	A Força do Querer	Nominated	

=== Prêmio Extra de Televisão ===
Year	Category	Nominated	Result	Ref.
2010	Best Actress	Cama de Gato	Nominated	
2013	Best Actress	Amor à Vida	Nominated	
2015	Best Actress	Felizes para Sempre?	Nominated	
2017	Best Actress	A Força do Querer	Nominated	

=== Internet Trophy ===
Year	Category	Nominated	Result	Ref.
2014	Best Actress	Amor à Vida	Nominated	
2016	Best Actress	Além do Tempo	Nominated	
2018	Best Actress	A Força do Querer	Nominated	
