= Danilo Mesquita =

Brazilian actor

- Born: Danilo Mesquita Santos de Oliveira; 26 February 1992 (age 34); Salvador, Bahia, Brazil
- Occupations: Actor; singer
- Years active: 2012–present

Danilo Mesquita Santos de Oliveira (born 26 February 1992) is a Brazilian actor and singer.

== Career ==
Before becoming an actor, he dedicated himself for seven years to football. At the age of 17, he was discovered by an agent, who invited him to work as a model at a prestigious agency.. Danilo decided to accept and give up his football career. A month later, he was advised by the agency to take acting classes, so he began doing theater at Nu Espaço in Rio de Janeiro. After graduating in 2012 he performed in the play Paixao de Cristo. In 2014 he did the play The Merchant of Venice. In 2015, he made his debut in soap operas, playing Máximo in I Love Paraisópolis. In 2016, he was part of the new season of the novel Os Dez Mandamentos as Tales. In the same year he participated in two episodes of the Netflix tv show 3% as Alexandre. In 2017 lived Nicolau, a young cancer victim in the soap opera Rock Story. Besides being an actor, Danilo is also a singer, In 2018 he and actor Ravel Andrade play and sing in the band Beraderos.

In 2018, he played Valentim in the soap opera Segundo Sol. In 2019, he signed with Netflix and starred in the series Spectros, which premiered in 2020. In 2019, his band Beraderos signed with A Nascimento Música, a label created by Milton Nascimento and his son Augusto, and began recording the group's first album. In 2020, he starred alongside Giovanna Lancellotti, in the feature film Rich in Love, playing Teto, a rich young man and future heir to his father's successful tomato factory. The film is a Netflix romantic comedy.

== Filmography ==
=== Television ===
Year	Title	Role
2015	I Love Paraisópolis	Máximo Evagelista Mourão (Primo)
2016	3%	Alexandre Nogueira
2016	Os Dez Mandamentos	Tales
2016	Rock Story	Nicolau Sabóia
2018	Segundo Sol	Valentim Batista Falcão
2019–2020	Éramos Seis	Carlos Abílio de Lemos
2020	Spectros	Pardal
2022	Além da Ilusão	Joaquim Alves
2024	Benefits with Friends	Marcelo Duarte

=== Film ===
Year	Title	Role
2020	Rich in Love	Teto
2026	O Advogado de Deus	Alberto
