= Marcelo Serrado =

Brazilian actor (born 1967)

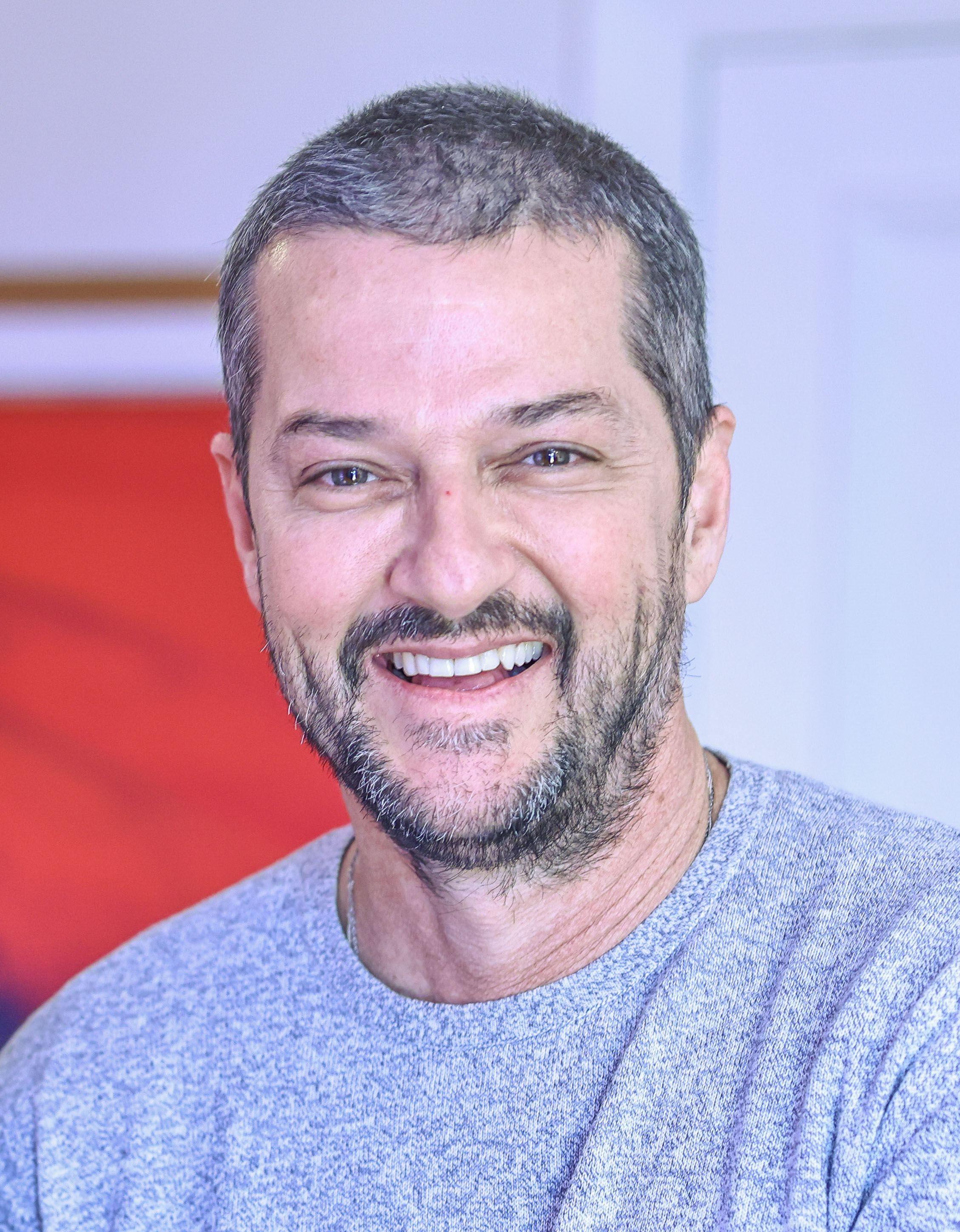
- Serrado in 2022
- Born: Marcelo Magalhães Serrado; 10 February 1967 (age 58); Rio de Janeiro, Brazil
- Occupation: Actor
- Years active: 1986–present
- Spouses: Christine Fernandes (m. 1994; div. 1999) Rafaela Mandelli (m. 2003; div. 2006) Roberta Fernandes (m. 2012)
- Children: 3

Marcelo Magalhães Serrado (born 10 February 1967) is a Brazilian actor.

== Biography ==
Marcelo began his career at CAL (Casa de Arte das Laranjeiras) in 1985. He made his television debut in 1987 in the telenovela Corpo Santo of TV Manchete. In 1989, Serrado moved to Rede Globo, where he was cast in Pacto de Sangue.

In 2005, after 15 years working in several Rede Globo productions, Serrado decided not to renew his contract with the station to work on Mandrake, a series produced by cable channel HBO Brazil. After three years at Rede Record, he starred in the novels Prova de Amor and Vidas Opostas.

In 2008, Serrado hosted the musical reality show Tom & Vinícius, o musical. Serrado, the creator of the show, wanted to show the young duo meeting in 1955 to assemble the play Orfeu da Conceição in 1965 with international fame. The cast played Tom Jobim as Thelmo Fernandes and Vinicius de Moraes.

Serrado in 2009, joined the cast of Poder Paralelo of Rede Record.

In 2010, the actor was famous for the monologue Não Existe Mulher Difícil. The following year, Serrado appeared on the big screen in the feature film Malu de Bicicleta.

He returned to Rede Globo in 2011, where he played Crô, a homosexual, with Butler as the villain's sidekick, played by Tereza Cristina (Christiane Torloni) in the primetime telenovela Fina Estampa.

In 2012, he was cast in the telenovela Gabriela. In November of the same year, it was announced by columnist Regina Rito, the newspaper O Dia, that Serrado will play the character Crô of Fina Estampa again, but now in a feature film. The script of Super Crô - O Filme was then being written by Aguinaldo Silva, together with Rodrigo Ribeiro and Maurício Gyboski. It was directed by Bruno Barreto.

== Personal life ==
He was married to actress Christine Fernandes from 1994 to 1999. The actor has a daughter named Catarina, from his ex-wife, actress Rafaela Mandelli. On 4 August 2012, Serrado married the ballerina Roberta Fernandes, and on 9 April 2013, the couple welcomed twins, named Felipe and Guilherme. For panic syndrome, Marcelo Serrado is being treated with medication and Transcendental Meditation.

== Filmography ==
=== Television ===
Year	Title	Role	Notes
1987	Corpo Santo	Carlinhos	
1989	Pacto de Sangue	Antônio	
1990	Brasileiras e Brasileiros	Boca	
1990	Desejo	Quidinho	
1990	Mico Preto	Robin	
1991	O Dono do Mundo	Umberto	
1992	Anos Rebeldes	Edgar Ribeiro	
1993	O Mapa da Mina	Sílvio Azevedo	
1993	Menino de Engenho	Juca	TV special
1994	Você Decide		Ep: "O Louco"
1994	Quatro por Quatro	Dr. Danilo	
1995	Você Decide		Ep: "Jóia Rara"
1995	Caso Especial		Cameo
1996	Você Decide		Ep: "Véu de Noiva"
1996	Quem É Você?	Iuri	
1997	Você Decide		Ep: "Ciúmes"
1997	Por Amor	César Andrade	
1998	Labirinto	Junior	
1998	Pecado Capital	Vinícius Lisboa	
1999	Força de um Desejo	Mariano Xavier	
2000	Esplendor	Piloto	Cameo
2001	Porto dos Milagres	Rodolfo Augusto	
2002	Brava Gente	Jesse	Ep: "Loucos de Pedra"
2002	Sabor da Paixão	Nelson Carvalho	
2004	Sítio do Picapau Amarelo	Polidoro	Cameo
2004	Linha Direta	Walton Avancini	Ep: "O Crime do Sacopã"
2004	Sob Nova Direção	Tavinho	Ep: "Será Que Elas São?"
2005	Mad Maria	Jim	
2005	Sob Nova Direção	Romualdo	Ep: "Como Emagrecer Sofrendo"
2005	A Diarista	Alvaro	Ep: "Dente Inocente"
2005	Mandrake	Raul	8 episodes
2005	Prova de Amor	Daniel Avelar	
2006	Vidas Opostas	Delegado Dênis Nogueira	
2007	O Tablado e Maria Clara Machado	Himself	Documentary
2007	Mandrake	Raul	5 episodes
2009	Poder Paralelo	Bruno Vilar	
2011	Fina Estampa	Crodoaldo Valério	
2012	Gabriela	Tonico Bastos	
2012	Mandrake	Raul	2 episodes
2014	O Caçador	Douglas	Cameo
2016	Velho Chico	Carlos Eduardo	
2017	Pega Pega	Malagueta	
2018	O Sétimo Guardião	Nicolau Zerzil	
2018	Sob Pressão	Roberto Arruda	
2022	Cara e Coragem	Moacyr Figueira	
2023	The Masked Singer Brasil (season 3)	Milho de Milhões	
2025	Beleza Fatal	Rog Ferreira "Dr. Peitão"	
2026	Três Graças	Crodoaldo Valério	

=== Film ===
Year	Title	Role	Notes
1992	Os Moradores da Rua Humboldt		Short film
1993	A Flor da Pele	Jorge	
1995	Super-Colosso: a Gincana da TV Colosso	Rafael Morais	
1999	Bem-Vindo ao Paraíso	Peter's brother	Short film
2000	Célia & Rosita		Short film
2002	Que sera, sera	Zé Henrique	
2003	Oswaldo Cruz – O Médico do Brasil	Salles Guerra	Short film
2003	Noite de São João	João	
2008	Mais Uma História No Rio	Delegate	Short film
2011	Malu de Bicicleta	Luiz Mário	
2013	Crô: O Filme	Crodoaldo Valério	
2014	Rio, I Love You	Célio	segment "Acho que Estou Apaixonado"
2016	Sing	Gunther	Brazilian voice actor
2017	Polícia Federal: A Lei É para Todos	Sergio Moro	
2018	Crô em Família	Crodoaldo Valério	
