= Cara e Coragem =

Brazilian telenovela aired by TV Globo

- Genre: Telenovela; Action-adventure
- Created by: Claudia Souto
- Written by: Claudia Souto; Isadora Wilkinson; Julia Laks; Wendell Bendelack; Zé Dassilva
- Directed by: Cadu França; Matheus Malafaia; Mayara Aguiar; Adriano Melo; Natalia Grimberg
- Starring: Paolla Oliveira; Marcelo Serrado; Taís Araújo
- Theme music composer: Herbert Vianna
- Opening theme: "Ska" by Os Paralamas do Sucesso
- Composer: Rogério Vaz
- Country of origin: Brazil
- Original language: Portuguese
- No. of seasons: 1
- No. of episodes: 197

Production
- Executive producer: Lucas Zardo
- Producer: Mônica Fernandes
- Cinematography: João Tristão
- Editor: Juliana Neves
- Running time: 27–50 minutes
- Production company: Estúdios Globo

Original release
- Network: TV Globo
- Release: 30 May 2022 – 13 January 2023

Cara e Coragem is a Brazilian telenovela produced and broadcast by TV Globo, that aired from 30 May 2022 to 13 January 2023. The telenovela is created by Claudia Souto and co-written with Isadora Wilkinson, Julia Laks, Wendell Bendelack, and Zé Dassilva. It stars Paolla Oliveira, Marcelo Serrado, and Taís Araújo.

In 2023, the show was nominated for the International Emmy Award for Best Telenovela.

== Plot ==
Siderúrgica Gusmão develops a secret formula based on magnesium that becomes the target of Leonardo, brother of the company's director, Clarice Gusmão. Stunt performers Pat and Moa are hired by Clarice to find Jonathan Azevedo's formula, and they see in the challenge a chance to keep their financial situations healthy, guaranteed by their work on film sets. Pat is married and the mother of two children, while Moa has been a single father since his separation from Rebeca. Both have a reciprocal passion for each other, but they don't admit their feelings.

Pat and Moa locate the briefcase containing the formula in a cave in a remote forest, but then find out that Clarice has been murdered, and start an investigation to find out who is behind the mysterious crime. They are joined by Italo, Clarice's former security guard with whom she had a relationship, and Rico, one of the partners at the Coragem.com stunt agency. In the search for clues they end up meeting Anita, Clarice's doppelganger.

== Cast ==
- Paolla Oliveira as Patrícia "Pat" Lima
- Marcelo Serrado as Moacyr "Moa" Figueira
- Taís Araújo as Clarice Gusmão and Anita Lopes
- Paulo Lessa as Ítalo Santana
- Ícaro Silva as Leonardo Gusmão
- Ricardo Pereira as Danilo Bosco
- Mel Lisboa as Regina Costa Gusmão
- Carmo Dalla Vecchia as Alfredo Laes
- Mariana Santos as Rebeca Bosco Levi
- Maria Eduarda de Carvalho as Andrea Pratini
- Guilherme Weber as Jonathan Avezedo
- André Luiz Frambach as Heitor Gabriel Bastos "Rico"
- Vitória Bohn as Lourdes Maria "Lou"
- Bruno Fagundes as Renan
- Leopoldo Pacheco as João Carlos "Joca" Lima
- Stella Maria Rodrigues as Nadir Lima
- Paula Braun as Olívia Rangel
- Kaysar Dadour as Kaká Bezerra
- Claudia Di Moura as Martha Gusmão
- Sérgio Loroza as Vinícius "Vini"
- Kiko Mascarenhas as Bob Wright / Irandir Duarte
  - Lucas Lanna as Child Irandir Duarte
- Jeniffer Nascimento as Jéssica Ferreira
- Júlia Lund as Deputy Marcela Alves
- Fernando Caruso as Detective Paulo Arantes
- Rodrigo Fagundes as Armando Azevedo
- Ariane Souza as Margareth
- Amanda Mirasci as Cleide
- Carol Portes as Dalva
- Anselmo Vasconcellos as Milton Figueira
- Ivone Hoffmann as Adélia Figueira
- Guida Vianna as Dagmar
- Marcelo Valle as Gustavo Souza Bastos
- Raquel Rocha as Teresa "Teca" Bastos
- Gabriela Loran as Luana
- Mika Makino as Ísis Vieira
- Igor Fernandez as Lucas Batista
- Pablo Sanábio as Enzo Barezzi
- Alana Ferri as Márcia
- Rafael Theophilo as Hugo Sá
- Sergio Kauffmann as Detective Jarbas
- João Campos as Ângelo
- Diogo Savala as Batata
- Zecarlos Moreno as Robson
- Alice Camargo as Sofia Lima Laes "Sossô"
- Diogo Caruso as Guilherme "Gui" Lima Laes
- Guilherme Tavares as Francisco Levi Figueira "Chiquinho"

=== Guest stars ===
- Othon Bastos as Deputy Peixoto
- Alejandro Claveaux as Samuel Rezende Silva "Samuca"
- Rafael Cardoso as Rômulo Dias
- Arlete Salles as Judge
- Agatha Moreira as herself
- Rodrigo Simas as himself
- Vanessa Giácomo as herself
- Thiago Fragoso as himself
- Tatá Werneck as herself
- Liniker as herself
- Jade Baraldo as herself

== Production ==
In September 2019, it was reported that Claudia Souto handed over to TV Globo's management the scripts of the first episodes of the telenovela, then called Amor em Ação (Love in Action). In February 2020, Cara e Coragem was announced as the official title of the telenovela. The following month, Globo indefinitely suspended production of telenovelas due to the COVID-19 pandemic. Souto continued to deliver the scripts for the episodes of the telenovela. In December 2021, part of the cast began preparing for their roles with action stuntmen. In March, filming officially began.

== Ratings ==
| Season | Episodes | First aired | | Last aired | | Avg. viewers (points) |
| Season | Episodes | Date | Viewers (points) | Date | Viewers (points) | Avg. viewers (points) |
|---|---|---|---|---|---|---|
| 1 | 197 | 30 May 2022 | 22.9 | 13 January 2023 | 20.3 | 20.8 |
