= Christine Fernandes =

Brazilian-American actress, TV presenter and model (born 1968)

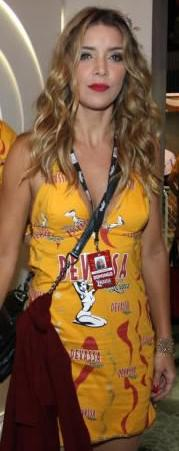
- Fernandes in 2011
- Born: Christine Fernandes Alves; 1 March 1968 (age 58); Chicago, Illinois, U.S.
- Citizenship: Brazil; United States
- Occupations: Actress; television presenter
- Years active: 1984–present
- Spouse: Marcelo Serrado (m. 1994; div. 1999) Floriano Peixoto (m. 2000; div. 2018)
- Children: 1

Christine Fernandes Alves (born 1 March 1968) is an American-born Brazilian actress, television presenter and former model.

== Early life ==
Christine was born in Chicago, Illinois, daughter of Maria Helena and Antônio, Brazilian parents. She was born and lived until the age of 3 in the United States, then her family returned to Brazil, to the city of Rio de Janeiro.

From thirteen to sixteen she was a volleyball player. Soon after she began modeling. At 17 she moved back to the United States to attend High School in California. When she turned 18, she moved to Japan and lived in Tokyo for 2 years working as a photographic model.

== Career ==
=== Model ===
In 1984, at the age of 16, she was approached by a professional from a fashion agency who invited her to take a pathogenic test, becoming a model in that year. The following year he moved to the United States to model and in the country, he finished high school and joined the faculty of journalism, which did not finish.

In 1992, she moved to Japan, where she modeled for two more years before deciding to return to Brazil to study theater at Globo's Actors Workshop in 1994.

=== Actress ===
After a test for the Actors Workshop of Rede Globo, was cast in his first TV appearance, an interest in the novel Quatro por Quatro (1995), of Carlos Lombardi. The following year, Manoel Carlos met the young actress and gave her a prominent role in História de Amor. Among other works, Christine attended Perdidos de Amor, a novel independent Rede Bandeirantes, but soon returned and appeared in the Rede Globo productions as Chiquinha Gonzaga (1999) and Esplendor (2000), in which she met the actor Marcelo Serrado, with whom she was married from 1994 to 1999. She made her first appearance on film in Slapstick and O Trapalhão e a Luz Azul (1999), Paulo Aragão Neto and Alexandre Boury.

After 4 years without integrating the fixed cast of a telenovela in the Globo, Christine signed with RecordTV in 2005 and debuted its first great protagonist, Aurélia in Essas Mulheres, character based on the book Senhora, of José de Alencar. By Aurélia, actress was praised by the specialized critic, noting its maturation in scene when facing a deep and of great complexity character, being his work of greater recognition in the race. In 2006, due to the repercussion of her previous novel, Rede Globo called Christine back to one of the central characters of Páginas da Vida. In 2007 Christine was in the cast of the play Hedda Glaber. Christine joined the cast of the soap opera A Favorita in 2008. The actress in 2009, joined the cast of soap opera Viver a Vida of Rede Globo.

In 2010 Christine joined the cast of the seventh season of Dança dos Famosos, under the Domingão do Faustão. In 2011 she presented the program Saia Justa, in the GNT, along with Dan Stulbach, Eduardo Moscovis, Mônica Waldvogel, Teté Ribeiro, Xico Sá and Léo Jaime, but left the program because of personal problems and was replaced by actress Camila Morgado.

In 2012 she was in the episode A Fofoqueira de Porto Alegre in series As Brasileiras and made participation in the novels Avenida Brasil of João Emanuel Carneiro, in which she played Mônica and Cheias de Charme, in which she played the American journalist Scarlet. In the same year returns to cinemas with the film De Pernas pro Ar 2.

In 2016, after seven years without being escalated to a novel, Christine decides not to renew contract with Globo aiming at new challenges in the race. In 2017 she signed with RecordTV and played the first major antagonist of her career, Sammu-Ramat in O Rico e Lázaro.

After O Rico e Lázaro on RecordTV, Christine returns to Rede Globo in the novel Orgulho e Paixão. In the plot, interprets Josephine, wife of Almirante Tibúrcio, lived by Oscar Magrini.

== Personal life ==
In 1994, she married actor Marcelo Serrado, with whom she remained until 1999.

She was married to actor Floriano Peixoto, with whom she has a son, Pedro, born in July 2003. The two separated in early 2018.

== Filmography ==
=== Television ===
Year	Title	Role	Notes
1995	Quatro por Quatro	Ralado's girlfriend	Episode: "February 2, 1995"
1995	História de Amor	Marininha	
1996	Você Decide	Clara	Episode: "Aconteceu..."
1996	Malhação	Maribel Lamarca	Participation
1996	Perdidos de Amor	Maria Luísa	
1998	Você Decide	Amanda	Episode: "Tabu"
1998	Você Decide	Viviane	Episode: "Amor ao Próximo"
1998	Caça Talentos	Melissa	Episode: "Apocalipse Girls"
1998	Labirinto	Dora	
1999	Chiquinha Gonzaga	Alzira	
2000	Esplendor	Flávia Regina	
2001	Estrela-Guia	Lalá Gouveia	
2003	Kubanacan	Blanca Paiani	Episodes: "December 6–10, 2003"
2005	Essas Mulheres	Aurélia Lemos Camargo	
2006	Páginas da Vida	Simone Bueno	
2008	A Favorita	Rita Porto	
2009	Superbonita	Guest presenter	Episode: "July 30, 2009"
2009	Viver a Vida	Ariane Vidigal	
2010	Dança dos Famosos 7	Participant	Domingão do Faustão's reality show
2010	A Vida Alheia	Melina Rosa	Episode: "Nem tudo que Reluz"
2010	Diversão.com	Paula	Television special
2011	Saia Justa	Presenter	Season 10
2012	As Brasileiras	Lili Galhardo	Episode: "A Fofoqueira de Porto Alegre"
2012	Avenida Brasil	Mônica	Episode: "June 11, 2012"
2012	Cheias de Charme	Scarlet Benson	Episodes: "September 6–8, 2012"
2013	Louco por Elas	Margot	Episode: "O Ursinho de Pelúcia do Léo"
2013	Super Chef Celebridades	Participant	Season 2; Reality show of Mais Você
2017	O Rico e Lázaro	Sammu-Ramat	
2018	Orgulho e Paixão	Josephine Tibúrcio	

=== Films ===
Year	Title	Role
1999	O Trapalhão e a Luz Azul	Princess Allim / Milla
2000	Duas Vezes com Helena	Helena
2001	Amores Possíveis	Meeting agency's secretary
2001	O Xangô de Baker Street	Albertina
2002	Lara	Odete Lara
2003	Rua 6, Sem Número	Maíra
2005	Mais uma Vez Amor	Clara
2012	De Pernas pro Ar 2	Vitória Prattes
2014	Os Caras de Pau em O Misterioso Roubo do Anel	Gracinha de Medeiros
2015	Bem Casados	Laura
2016	My Hindu Friend	Dra. Virgínia

== Theater ==
Year	Title	Role
2007	Hedda Gabler - Henrik Ibsen	Hedda Gabler
