= Giullia Buscacio =

Portuguese Brazilian actress

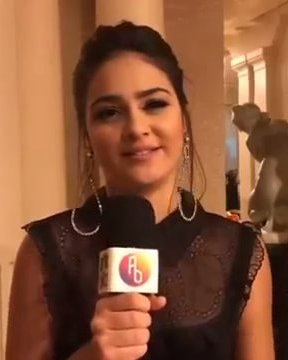
- Buscacio in 2019
- Born: Giullia Buscacio Vieira; 21 January 1997 (age 29); Funchal, Madeira, Portugal
- Occupation: Actress
- Years active: 2009–present

Giullia Buscacio Vieira (born January 21, 1997) is a Portuguese Brazilian actress.

== Biography ==
Giullia was born in Funchal, the capital of Madeira Island, daughter of the Brazilian striker Júlio César Gouveia Vieira, who played in Botafogo and clubs in South Korea and Hungary (Fehérvar FC), and Adriana de Farias Buscacio. She was born when her father went to play at Club Sport Marítimo. Later, she lived for four years in South Korea. Korean telenovelas were responsible for awakening in Giullia the will to act. In addition to her native Portuguese, she is able to speak Korean fluently.

== Career ==
Her debut on television occurred in the year 2009, at the age of twelve, in the series A Lei e o Crime, transmitted by Record. In 2012 she made the soap opera Balacobaco, also in the Record, however, from an early age she showed an artistic vocation, producing some independent short films such as "O Menino Mofado".

Her most prominent role was in the soap opera I Love Paraisópolis, broadcast by TV Globo, in which she played the rebellious and spoiled Bruna. In 2016 she joined the cast of the telenovela Velho Chico, where she lives her first primetime character, the romantic Olívia, where she forms a romantic couple with Gabriel Leone.

Yanna Lavigne would make the character of the indigenous Jacira in the novel Novo Mundo, but as she became pregnant, Giullia took the paper.

== Filmography ==
=== Television ===
Year	Title	Role	Notes	Ref
2009	A Lei e o Crime	Patrícia		
2010	Nosso Querido Trapalhão	Renato's sister	Year end special	
2011	Aquele Beijo	Menina do orfanato	Participation	
2012	Balacobaco	Vitória Travassos Porto		
2015	I Love Paraisópolis	Bruna Bezerra Antunes		
2016	Velho Chico	Olívia Rosa dos Anjos		
2017	Novo Mundo	Jacira		
2019	Éramos Seis	Isabel		
2024	Renascer	Sandra		

=== Film ===
Year	Title	Role
2011	O Menino Mofado	Ana
