= Rich in Love (2020 film) =

2020 film directed by Bruno Garotti, Anita Barbosa

- Film poster
- Portuguese: Ricos de Amor
- Directed by: Bruno Garotti; Anita Barbosa
- Written by: Bruno Garotti; Sylvio Gonçalves
- Starring: Danilo Mesquita; Giovanna Lancellotti; Fernanda Paes Leme
- Production company: Ananã Produções
- Distributed by: Netflix
- Release date: 30 April 2020
- Running time: 104 minutes
- Country: Brazil
- Language: Portuguese

Rich in Love (Portuguese: Ricos de Amor) is a 2020 Brazilian romantic comedy film directed by Bruno Garotti and Anita Barbosa, written by Bruno Garotti and Sylvio Gonçalves and starring Danilo Mesquita, Giovanna Lancellotti and Fernanda Paes Leme.

It was released on Netflix on 30 April 2020.

Its sequel, Rich in Love 2 (Portuguese: Ricos de Amor 2) was released on June 2, 2023.

== Plot ==
Son of successful businessman Teodoro (Ernani Moraes), the Tomato King "O Rei do Tomate", Teto's (Danilo Mesquita) life can be summed up as: the good life, money, the farm and women. Just as he is due to inherit his father's plantations and factories empire, Teto's life is turned upside down when he meets Paula (Giovanna Lancellotti), an independent and determined medical student.

As Teto's birthday party nears, his father tells him what his present is: a job. The traditional Festa do Tomate, with DJ Alok's special participation, is perhaps one of Teto's last opportunities to enjoy his peaceful life in his town. And it is in this electronic and country music festival that the lives of Teto and Paula cross.

Hoping to win the heart of the girl, and also wanting to prove his worth both to his father and himself, Teto lies about who he is, hiding his roots and pretending to be of humble beginnings. This is the first of many lies that gets him into trouble in Río de Janeiro. His best friend, Igor (Jaffar Bambirra), an agricultural worker, is his assistant in this romantic and chaotic adventure that also includes the human resources consultant of Trancoso, Alana (Fernanda Paes Leme), tough Monique. (Lellê), in addition to Paula's friends Raíssa and Kátia.

== Cast ==
- Danilo Mesquita as Teto
- Giovanna Lancellotti as Paula
- Jaffar Bambirra as Igor
- Lellê as Monique
- Fernanda Paes Leme as Alana
- Ernani Moraes as Teodoro Trancoso
- Bruna Griphao as Raissa
- Jennifer Dias as Katia
- Gillray Coutinho as Célio
- Caio Paduan as Dr. Victor
- Alok as Alok
- Ricardo Ferreira as Taxista
- Marco Antonio de Carvalho as Brutamontes
- Oscar Calixto as Zé
- Thadeu Matos as Brutamontes 3
