= Black rose symbolism =

Fictional symbol with different meanings

Black roses are roses that are black in color. They do not occur naturally but have various symbolic meanings in different contexts.

The anarchist symbol of the black rose

== Flowers ==
The flowers commonly called black roses do not really exist in said color, instead they actually have a dark shade, such as the "Black Magic", "Barkarole", "Black Beauty" and "Baccara" varieties. They can be artificially colored as well.

In the language of flowers, roses have many different meanings. Black roses symbolize ideas such as hatred, despair, death or rebirths.

== Anarchism ==
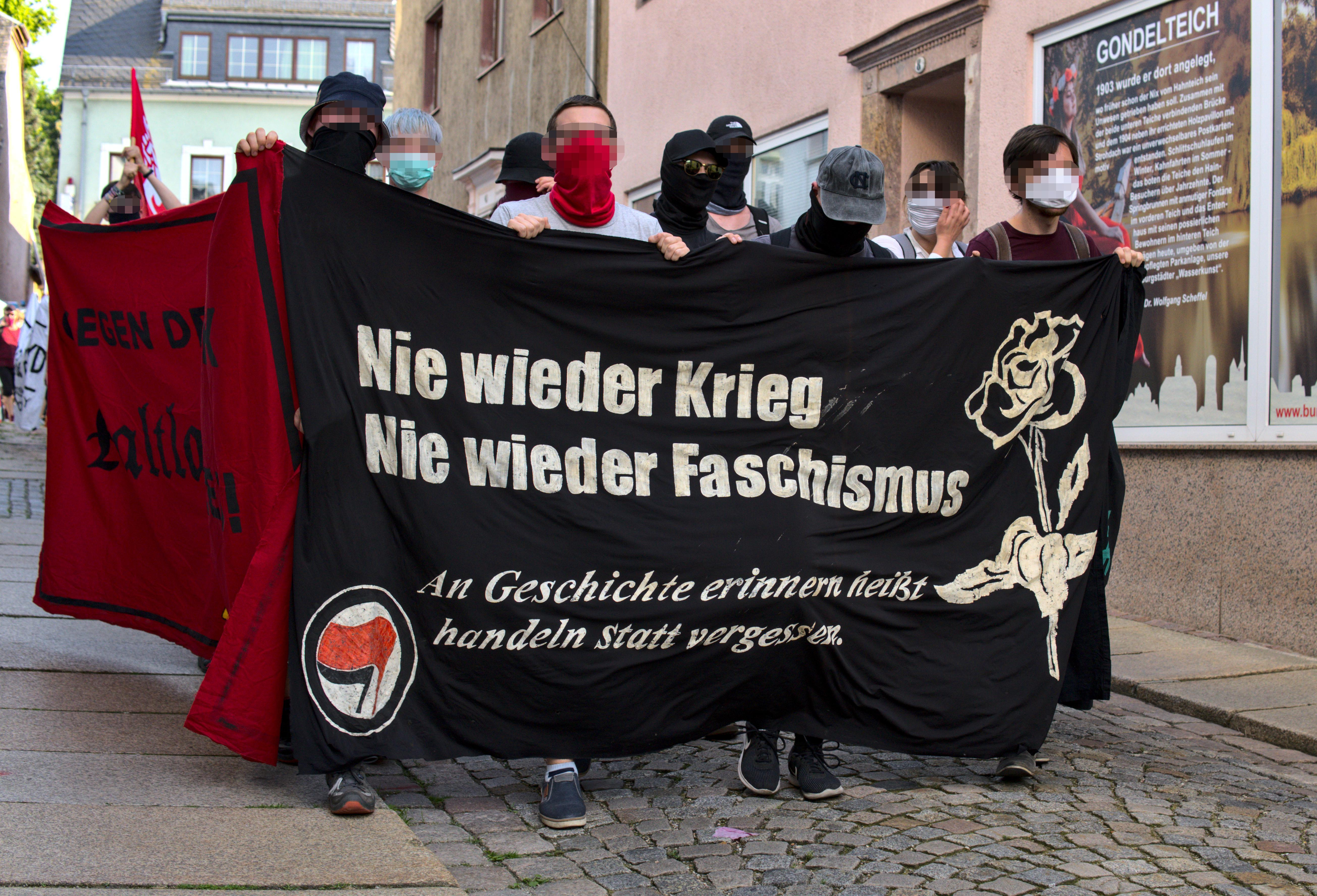
Anarchist anti fascists with black rose

Black Rose Books is the name of the Montreal anarchist publisher and small press imprint headed by the libertarian-municipalist and anarchist Dimitrios Roussopoulos. One of the two anarchist bookshops in Sydney is Black Rose Books which has existed in various guises since 1982.

The Black Rose was the title of a respected journal of anarchist ideas published in the Boston area during the 1970s, as well as the name of an anarchist lecture series addressed by notable anarchist and libertarian socialists (including Murray Bookchin and Noam Chomsky) into the 1990s.

Black Rose Anarchist Federation is a political organization that was founded in 2014, with a few local and regional groups in the United States.

== See also ==
- Anarchist symbolism
- Black Rose (BDSM organization)
