= André Frambach =

Brazilian actor (born 1997)

André Luiz Frambach
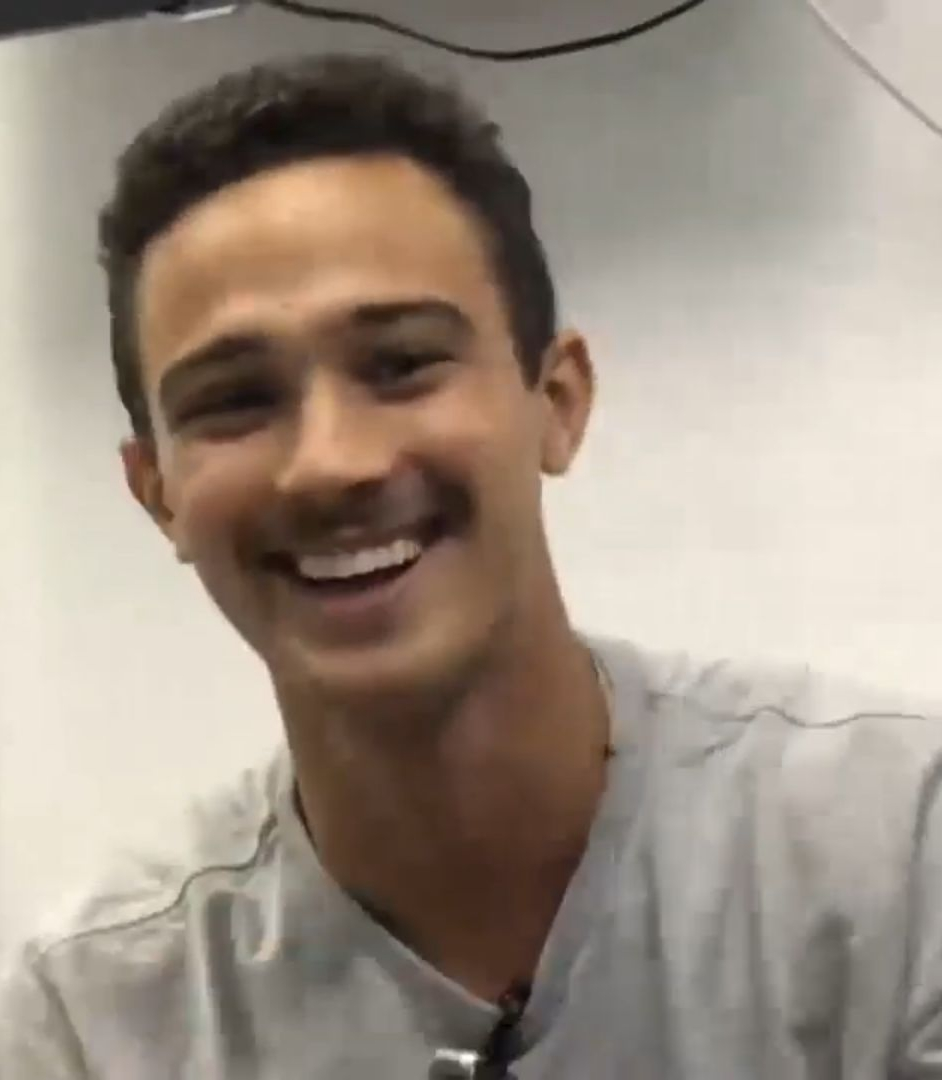
- Frambach in 2019
- Born: André Luiz Pfaltzgraff Frambach; 15 February 1997 (age 28); Niterói, Rio de Janeiro, Brazil
- Occupation: Actor
- Years active: 2006–present
- Spouse: Larissa Manoela (m. 2023)

André Luiz Pfaltzgraff Frambach (born 15 February 1997) is a Brazilian actor.

== Career ==
He began his career at age nine, as Leandro in "Por Toda Minha Vida." He later acted a role of Dalton Vigh as a child, Juvenaldo Ferreira in " Duas Caras", Davi in the miniseries " Queridos Amigos", and Franzé in "Ciranda de Pedra". In 2008, he also made a special appearance in A Favorita as Huey, and in 2009, as a boy in Paraíso. In 2016 returned to telenovela like Juninho, A Lei do Amor.

In 2017, he also played a lead role in the 26th season Malhação: Vidas Brasileiras. In 2019, he lived Julinho, one of the protagonists of the soap opera Éramos Seis. In 2020, Frambach played the lead role of João in the comedy film Airplane Mode with Larissa Manoela.

In 2022, he played the lead role of Miguel in the Netflix series Temporada de Verão and also played the role of Heitor Gabriel Bastos "Rico" in the telenovela Cara e Coragem.

== Personal life ==
In January 2019, he started dating actress Rayssa Bratillieri, with whom he made a romantic couple in Malhação: Vidas Brasileiras and Éramos Seis. The couple ended their relationship in June 2021 after more than 2 years together.

In July 2022, he started dating actress Larissa Manoela, with whom he had already had a relationship between July and October 2021. In December 2022, André proposed to Larissa.

== Filmography ==
=== Television ===
Year	Title	Role	Notes
2007	Por Toda Minha Vida	Leandro (child)	Episode: "Leandro"
2008	Duas Caras	Juvenaldo Ferreira (child)	Episodes: "14–21 May"
2008	Queridos Amigos	Davi Rosemberg Neto	
2008	Ciranda de Pedra	Francisco José Carmelo Cassini (Franzé)	
2008	Dançinha dos Famosos	Participant	
2008	A Favorita	Huguinho	Episode: "25 November"
2009	Paraíso	Zico	Episode: "22 April"
2010–11	Passione	Cridinho	
2016–17	A Lei do Amor	Misael de Oliveira Júnior "Juninho"	
2017	O Rico e Lázaro	Labashi-Marduk	
2018–19	Malhação: Vidas Brasileiras	Márcio Porto	Season 26
2019–2020	Éramos Seis	Júlio Abílio de Lemos Filho "Julinho"	
2022	Temporada de Verão	Miguel	
2022–23	Cara e Coragem	Heitor Gabriel Bastos "Rico"	

=== Film ===
Year	Title	Role	Notes
2010	Chico Xavier	Young José	
2017	Dormente		Short film
2020	Airplane Mode	João	Netflix film
2023	Tá Escrito	Breno	
2025	Traição entre Amigas	Gabriel	

=== Theater ===
Year	Title
2006	Histórias do Arco da Velha
2008	Natal Na Praça

== Awards and nominations ==
Year	Award	Category	Recommendation	Result
2009	Prêmio Contigo! de TV	Best Child Actor	Queridos Amigos	Nominated
2022	Prêmio Jovem Brasileiro	Eu Shippo (I Shipp)	André e Larissa Manoela	Nominated
2022	Capricho Awards	Couple of the Year	André e Larissa Manoela	Won
2022	Retrô Gshow	Couple of the Year	André e Larissa Manoela	Nominated
2022	BreakTudo Awards	Best National Actor	Cara e Coragem	Nominated
