= List of winners of the Extra Television Awards for Best Supporting Actor =

Prêmio Extra de Televisão de melhor ator coadjuvante
- Awarded for: Best Performance by an Actor in a Supporting Role in a Series, Miniseries, or Television Film
- Country: Brazil
- Presented by: newspaper Extra
- First award: 1998
- Currently held by: Irandhir Santos; Velho Chico (2016)

The Prêmio Extra de Televisão de melhor ator coadjuvante (English: Extra Television Awards for Best Supporting Actor) is an award presented annually by the newspaper Extra.

== Winners ==
- 2008 – Cauã Reymond in A Favorita
  - Ary Fontoura in A Favorita
  - Bruno Gagliasso in Ciranda de Pedra
  - Iran Malfitano in A Favorita
  - Jackson Antunes in A Favorita
- 2009 – Bruno Gagliasso in Caminho das Índias
  - Alexandre Nero in Paraíso
  - Antonio Calloni in Caminho das Índias
  - Elias Gleizer in Caminho das Índias
  - Fábio Lago in Caras & Bocas
  - Petrônio Gontijo in Poder Paralelo
- 2010 – Cauã Reymond in Passione
  - Rodrigo Lopez in Ti Ti Ti
  - Marcello Airoldi in Viver a Vida
  - Kiko Mascarenhas in Separação?!
  - Daniel Boaventura in Cama de Gato
  - Werner Schünemann in Passione
- 2011 – André Gonçalves in André Gonçalves
  - Herson Capri in Insensato Coração
  - Humberto Martins in O Astro
  - Marcos Caruso in Cordel Encantado
  - Otaviano Costa in Morde & Assopra
  - Ricardo Tozzi in Insensato Coração
- 2012 – José de Abreu in Avenida Brasil
  - Alexandre Borges in Avenida Brasil
  - José Wilker in Gabriela
  - Juliano Cazarré in Avenida Brasil
  - Marcos Caruso in Avenida Brasil
  - Marcos Palmeira in Cheias de Charme
- 2013 – Alexandre Nero in Salve Jorge
  - Anderson Di Rizzi in Amor à Vida
  - Joaquim Lopes in Sangue Bom
  - José Loreto in Flor do Caribe
  - Luís Mello in Amor à Vida
  - Nando Cunha in Salve Jorge
- 2014 – Aílton Graça in Império
  - José Mayer in Império
  - Luís Miranda in Geração Brasil
  - Marcello Melo Jr. in Em Família
  - Paulo Vilhena in Império
  - Rodrigo Pandolfo in Geração Brasil
- 2015 – Rainer Cadete in Verdades Secretas
  - Eduardo Moscovis in A Regra do Jogo
  - João Miguel in Felizes para Sempre?
  - Marcos Palmeira in Babilônia
  - Tonico Pereira in A Regra do Jogo
  - Zécarlos Machado in Os Dez Mandamentos
- 2016 – Irandhir Santos in Velho Chico
  - Anderson Di Rizzi in Êta Mundo Bom!
  - Enrique Diaz in Justiça
  - Gabriel Godoy in Haja Coração
  - Marco Nanini in Êta Mundo Bom!
  - Marco Ricca in Liberdade, Liberdade
