= Débora Nascimento =

Brazilian actress and model

- Nascimento in 2026
- Born: Débora dos Santos Nascimento; June 16, 1985 (age 41); Suzano, São Paulo, Brazil
- Occupations: Actress, model
- Spouses: Arthur Rangel (m. 2009; div. 2012) José Loreto (m. 2015; div. 2019)
- Children: 1
- Modeling information
- Height: 1.78 m (5 ft 10 in)
- Hair color: Dark Brown
- Eye color: Hazel

Débora dos Santos Nascimento (born June 16, 1985) is a Brazilian actress and model.

== Career ==
Nascimento began her acting career in film as the protagonist of the short film Cérbero, directed by Gastão Coimbra, and on television in the telenovela Paraíso Tropical, playing the role of Elisa. Her natural beauty and screen presence garnered attention, leading to a role in the American production The Incredible Hulk (2008). That same year, she appeared in the telenovela Duas Caras as Andréia Bijou.

Following her early success, Nascimento continued to build a diverse television career, appearing in acclaimed telenovelas such as Caminho das Índias (2009), Flor do Caribe (2013), and Segundo Sol (2018). Her performances have been praised for emotional depth and charisma. In film, she also starred in works like Cidade Baixa (2005) and Besouro (2009), solidifying her presence in Brazilian audiovisual storytelling. Known for her Afro-Brazilian heritage and strong presence, Nascimento has become an advocate for racial equality and representation in the media.

In 2012, she appeared in the novel Avenida Brasil, playing the character Tessália. In 2013, returned to TV as Taís, in the telenovela Flor do Caribe.

== Personal life ==
Débora Nascimento was born in Suzano, São Paulo. Her mother is of Italian and Brazilian origin, her father is of similar origin.

Nascimento was married for 3 years to businessman Arthur Rangel. They separated in August 2012. Shortly thereafter she began dating castmate from Avenida Brasil, José Loreto. They announced their relationship on the show Domingão do Faustão. Their daughter, Bella, was born in April 2018.

== Filmography ==
=== Television ===
Year	Title	Role	Notes
2007	Paraíso Tropical	Elisa	Cameo
2007	Duas Caras	Andréia Bijou	
2008	Episódio Especial	Herself	Cameo
2008	Guerra & Paz	Ruthinha	Ep. "Os Belos & As Feras"
2009	Uma Noite no Castelo	Zara	Special year-end
2009	Episódio Especial	Herself	Cameo
2009	Viver a Vida	Roberta Viana	
2011	Fina Estampa	Model	Cameo
2012	Acampamento de Férias 3: O Mistério da Ilha do Corsário	Lola	
2012	Avenida Brasil	Tessália	
2013	Flor do Caribe	Taís	
2014	Geração Brasil	María Vergara	
2014	Alto Astral	Sueli Caldas	
2016	Êta Mundo Bom!	Filomena (Filó)	
2019	Verão 90	Gisela Ferreira Lima Mendes (Gigi)	
2023	Olhar Indiscreto	Miranda	

=== Film ===
Year	Title	Role	Notes
2007	Cérbero	Maria Isabel	Short film
2008	The Incredible Hulk	Martina	
2009	Budapeste	Teresa	
2012	O Inventor de Sonhos	Matilda	
2014	Tarzan	Jane (Brazilian voice dubbing)	
2014	Rio, I Love You	A Musa	Segment: "A Musa"/transitions
2019	O Olho e a Faca		
2019	Pacificado	Andrea	

== Theater ==
Year	Play
2011	The Little Mermaid

== Awards and nominations ==
Year	Award	Category	Work	Results
2012	Melhores do Ano	Best Revelation Actress	Avenida Brasil	Nominated
