= Ailton Graça =

Brazilian actor (born 1964)

Aílton Graça
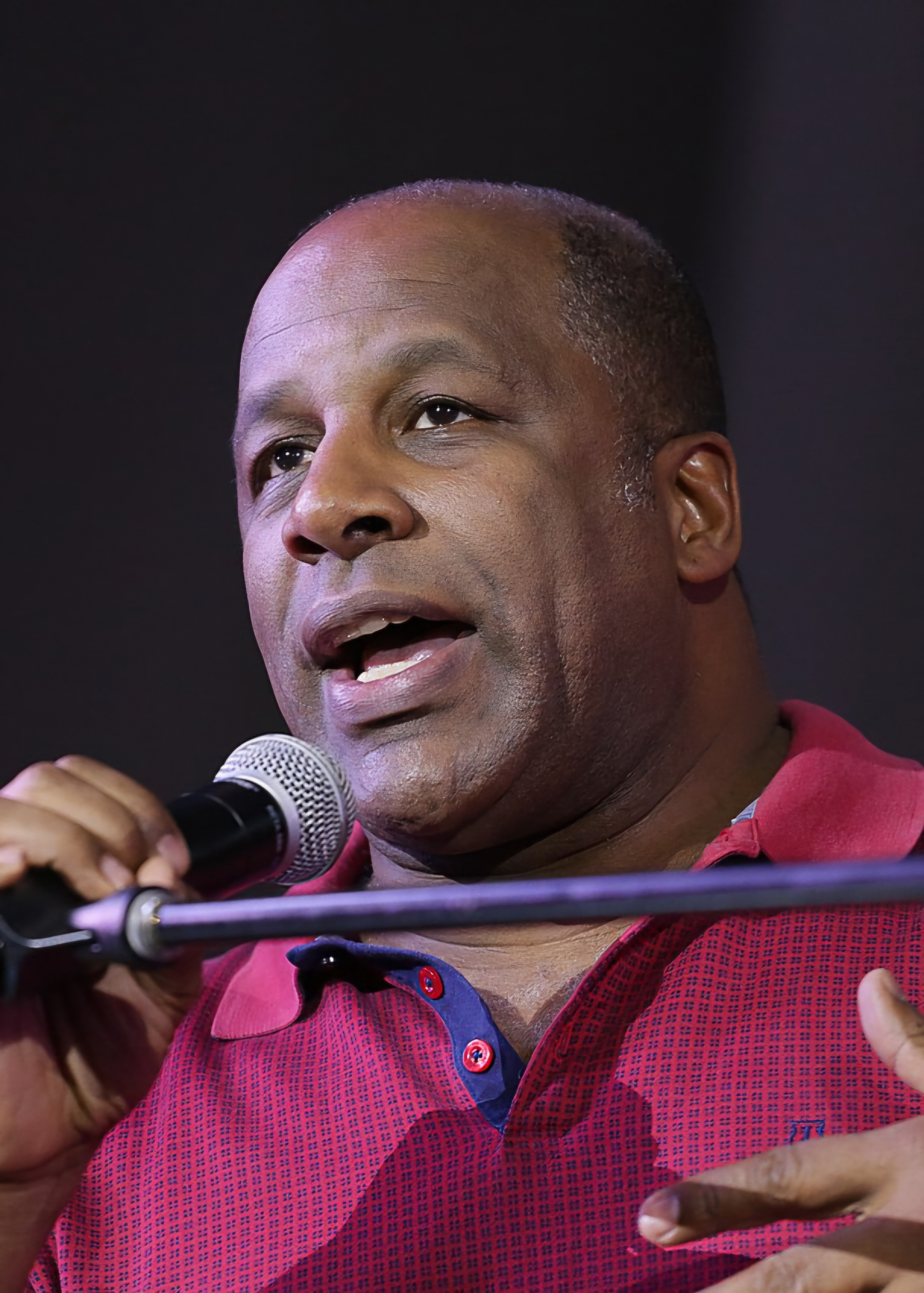
- Graça in 2018.
- Born: September 9, 1964 (age 61); São Paulo, Brazil
- Occupations: actor, scenographer, ballet dancer, clown
- Years active: 2000–present
- Spouse: Kátia Naiane (m. 2000)
- Awards: List

Aílton Graça (born September 9, 1964) is a Brazilian actor, scenographer, ballet dancer and clown.

== Biography ==
Aílton Graça was born in São Paulo. For a long time, he worked as a street vendor and is passionate about carnival. Being the son of a hospital porter and a housewife, he was raised on the outskirts of São Paulo, in the Americanópolis neighborhood. While still at school, he fell in love with dramaturgy, a time when he acted in several amateur plays.

== Career ==
Before becoming a professional actor, he was a stock inspector, a market stallholder and also worked as a shoe store salesman. Aílton was a public servant in the State of São Paulo when he was approved and sworn into a public competition for the State Public Servant Hospital. In this hospital, there was a leisure project for patients, created by some actors from the USP School of Dramatic Arts, participating and acting in various group actions.

In 1985, Aílton graduated from the Vocal Workshop at the Centro Cultural de São Paulo and later studied circus techniques at the Circo Escola Picadeiro. From 1986 to 1988, he was a student of Antunes Filho and rehearsed two plays from the group's repertoire: Macunaíma and A Hora e a Vez de Augusto Matraga, but was never cast in any of them.

In 2002, he was master of the room and front commission choreographer of the samba schools Gaviões da Fiel and União Independente da Zona Sul. The following year, he debuted in cinema as the character Majestade, commander of drug trafficking within the prison, in the film Carandiru.

In 2005, he debuted on television in the soap opera América, as Feitosa. After this soap opera, he also acted in the programs Cidade dos Homens, A Diarista and Retrato Falado. In addition, he participated in Cobras & Lagartos playing the comic Ramires and also appeared in Sete Pecados.

In December 2007, Aílton replaced Lázaro Ramos at the end of the São Paulo season of the play O Método Grönholm.

In December 2019, Aílton took over the presidency of one of the oldest samba schools in the São Paulo Carnival, Lavapés.

== Filmography ==
=== Television ===
Year	Title	Role	Notes
2003	Cidade dos Homens	Picote	Episode: "Sábado"
2003	A Diarista	Valdir	End year special
2004	A Diarista	Valdir	Season 1
2005	Carandiru, Outras Histórias	Majestade	
2005	América	José Feitosa "Feitosa"	
2006	Cobras & Lagartos	Ramires Miranda Café	
2007	Sete Pecados	Barão	
2008	Três Irmãs	Clodoaldo Astrogildo da Conceição "Jacaré"	
2008	Casos e Acasos	Denis	Episode: "O Encontro, O Assédio e O Convite"
2008	Casos e Acasos	Ricardo	Episode: "A Prova, a Namorada e a Isca"
2008	A Grande Família	Alberto	Episode: "O Maníaco do Subúrbio"
2009	Cama de Gato	José Sebastião dos Santos "Tião"	
2010	Na Forma da Lei	Delegate Moreira	
2010	As Cariocas	Djalma	Episode: "A Vingativa do Méier"
2010	Malhação	José Pinto "Seu Pintinho"	Season 18
2012	Avenida Brasil	Paulo Silas "Silas"	
2013	Flor do Caribe	Quirino Pereira	
2014	O Caçador	Delegate Lopes	
2014	Império	Xana Summer / Adalberto da Silva	
2015	Totalmente Demais	Florisval Pereira	
2017	Mister Brau	Rui	Episode: "June 27th"
2017	Cidade Proibida	Delegate Paranhos	
2018	Carcereiros	Juscelino	Season 1
2018	O Sétimo Guardião	Padre Ramiro	
2020	Salve-se Quem Puder	Juiz Vitório Albuquerque	Episodes: " January 27–29
2020	Falas Negras	Milton Santos	
2021	Sob Pressão	Genésio	Season 4
2022	Família Paraíso	Antônio Maria	Episode: "O Baile"
2022	Rota 66 - A Polícia que Mata	Homero Gama	
2022-23	Travessia	Abdias Monteiro "Monteiro"	
2023	Compro Likes	Ayrton	Episode: "#BasicBroWagner"
2024	Volta por Cima	Edson Bacelar	
2025	Pablo & Luisão	Luis Vieira da Silva (Luisão)	

=== Film ===
Year	Title	Role	Notes
2003	Carandiru	Majestade	
2004	Nina	Police officer	
2004	Meu Tio Matou um Cara	Laerte	
2006	Tapete Vermelho	Mané Charreteiro	
2006	Muito Gelo e Dois Dedos D'Água	Sergeant Nelson	
2006	Contra Todos	Waldomiro	
2006	Trair e Coçar É Só Começar	Nildomar	
2006	Muita Alegria e 40 Graus de Calor	Himself	Documentary
2006	Veias e Vinhos – Uma História Brasileira		
2007	Querô	Brandão	
2008	A Guerra dos Rocha	Marcondes	
2008	Os Desafinados	Marcos	
2009	Peacetime	Honório	
2009	Condomínio Jaqueline	Roque	
2009	Verônica	Major Diniz	
2009	Quanto Dura o Amor?	Zelador	
2010	Segurança Nacional	Daniel	
2010	Bróder	Francisco	
2011	Família Vende Tudo	Oberdã	Also associate producer
2012	Até que a Sorte nos Separe	Adelson / Jaques	
2015	Até que a Sorte nos Separe 3: A Falência Final	Adelson / Jaques	
2015	O Lucro Acima da Vida	Clodoaldo	
2017	Todas as Manhãs do Mundo	Sun (voice)	Documentary
2017	D.P.A - O Filme	Temporão	
2018	Finding Josef	Tião	
2018	Mare Nostrum	João Hanemann	
2019	Correndo Atrás	Paulo Gale "Ventania"	
2020	O Grande Cortejo da Memória Paulistana	Joaquim Pinto de Oliveira "Tebas"	Fictional documentary
2020	M8 - Quando a Morte Socorre a Vida	Sá	
2021	Galeria Futuro	Eddie	
2022	O Pai da Rita	Pudim	
2023	Mussum, o Filmis	Mussum	
2024	Dona Lurdes - O Filme	Sinvaldo "Pocadão das Tilhas"	
2026	O Gênio do Crime	Seu Tomé	

=== Music Videos ===
Year	Song	Artist
2017	"Verão Pra Te Aquecer"	Grupo Dose Certa
2019	"Pequenas Alegrias da Vida Adulta"	Emicida

=== Dubbing ===
Year	Title	Role
2019	Meu Nome é Liberdade	Samuel Fraunces

== Stage ==
Year	Title	Role
2007–08	O Método Grönholm	Fernando Pontes
2011	A Vida que Pedi, Adeus	Armando
2015	Intocáveis	Driss
2016–17	Solidão	Cigano Chema

== Awards and nominations ==
Year	Ceremony	Category	Nominations	Results
2003	Prêmio Arte Qualidade Brasil - RJ	Best Supporting Actor	Carandiru	Nominated
2003	Prêmio Arte Qualidade Brasil – SP	Best Supporting Actor	Carandiru	Nominated
2004	Festival Internacional de Cinema de Cartagena	Best Supporting Actor (with cast)	Carandiru	Won
2004	Prêmio Guarani de Cinema Brasileiro	Best Revelation	Carandiru	Nominated
2004	Festival de Cinema Luso-Brasileiro de Santa Maria	Best Actor	Contra Todos	Won
2005	Grande Prêmio do Cinema Brasileiro	Best Actor	Contra Todos	Nominated
2005	Prêmio Guarani de Cinema Brasileiro	Best Supporting Actor	Contra Todos	Won
2005	Prêmio Arte Qualidade Brasil - RJ	Best Supporting Actor in Film	Meu Tio Matou um Cara	Nominated
2005	Prêmio Arte Qualidade Brasil - RJ	Best New Actor	América	Won
2005	Prêmio Arte Qualidade Brasil – SP	Best New Actor	América	Won
2005	Melhores do Ano	Best New Actor	América	Won
2005	Troféu Raça Negra	Best Television Actor	América	Won
2005	Prêmio Extra de Televisão	Best New Actor	América	Nominated
2006	Prêmio Contigo! de TV	TV Revelation	América	Won
2006	Prêmio Contigo! de TV	Best Romantic Couple (with Paula Burlamaqui)	América	Nominated
2006	Prêmio TV Press	Best New Actor	América	Won
2006	Prêmio UOL e PopTevê de Televisão	Best New Actor	América	Won
2006	Prêmio Contigo! de Cinema Nacional	Best Supporting Actor	Meu Tio Matou um Cara	Nominated
2007	Prêmio Arte Qualidade Brasil	Best Supporting Actor	Cobras e Lagartos	Nominated
2010	Prêmio Contigo! de TV	Best Supporting Actor	Cama de Gato	Nominated
2010	Prêmio Arte Qualidade Brasil	Best Supporting Actor	Cama de Gato	Nominated
2012	Grande Prêmio do Cinema Brasileiro	Best Supporting Actor	Bróder	Nominated
2014	Prêmio Extra de Televisão	Best Supporting Actor	Império	Won
2014	Prêmio Quem de Televisão	Best Supporting Actor	Império	Nominated
2014	Melhores do Ano	Best Supporting Actor	Império	Won
2015	Prêmio Contigo! de TV	Best Supporting Actor	Império	Nominated
2019	Grande Prêmio do Cinema Brasileiro	Best Supporting Actor	Mare Nostrum	Nominated
2020	Festival Sesc Melhores Filmes	Best National Actor	M8 - Quando a Morte Socorre a Vida	Nominated
2023	Festival Sesc Melhores Filmes	Best National Actor	O Pai da Rita	Nominated
2023	Festival de Cinema de Gramado	Best Actor	Mussum, o filmis	Won
2023	Splash Awards	Best Performance in a National Film	Mussum, o filmis	Nominated
2023	Prêmio Potências	Actor of The Year	Mussum, o filmis	Nominated
2023	Veja Rio - Cariocas do Ano	Film	Mussum, o filmis	Won
2024	Prêmio Platino	Best Film Actor	Mussum, o filmis	Nominated
2024	Festival Sesc Melhores Filmes	Best National Actor (critic vote)	Mussum, o filmis	Won
2024	Festival Sesc Melhores Filmes	Best National Actor (public vote)	Mussum, o filmis	Won
2024	Prêmio Grande Otelo	Best Film Actor	Mussum, o filmis	Won
2024	Splash Awards	Best Performance in a National Film	Mussum, o filmis	Pending
2024	Prêmio F5	Best Performance in a Film	Mussum, o filmis	Pending
2024	Prêmio Ubuntu Potências Negras	Black Scenes (Actor)	Volta por Cima	Won
2024	Melhores do Ano	Supporting Actor	Volta por Cima	Nominated
