= Amora Mautner =

Brazilian television director (born 1975)

- Born: May 24, 1975 (age 51); Rio de Janeiro, Rio de Janeiro, Brazil
- Occupations: Television director, film director, ex-actress
- Years active: 1991–present
- Spouse: Marcos Palmeira (m. 2005; div. 2012)
- Partner: Arnon Affonso (2014–2020)
- Children: 1
- Parent(s): Jorge Mautner; Ruth Mendes

Amora Mautner (born May 24, 1975) is a Brazilian television director and former actress. She has worked in many telenovelas and TV series broadcast by Rede Globo.

== Biography ==
Mautner was born in Rio de Janeiro on May 24, 1975. She is the only daughter of famous singer and writer Jorge Mautner and historian Ruth Mendes, and is of Austrian-Jewish and Yugoslav descent on her father's side. She initially debuted as an actress, portraying Paula in the 1991–92 telenovela Vamp, and also appeared in an episode of the TV series Você Decide, but later abandoned the acting career to become involved in directing.

She debuted as assistant director in the first season of the long-running soap opera Malhação in 1995, but wouldn't direct her first telenovela until O Cravo e a Rosa from 2000. In 2012, Mautner and Ricardo Waddington (who would become one of her most frequent collaborators) won the Prêmio Contigo! de TV, in the category "Best Director", for Cordel Encantado. After her work in the successful Avenida Brasil, which was nominated to the International Emmy Award for Best Telenovela (and won her yet another Prêmio Contigo! de TV for Best Director in 2013), and Joia Rara, she was promoted to Rede Globo's art director in 2014.

On an interview to Época magazine from September 15, 2016, she stated that after finishing work on her most recent telenovela, A Regra do Jogo (2015–16), which was nominated to the International Emmy Award for Best Telenovela, she would take a temporary break from TV in order to begin work on her first full-length film, an adaptation of Fyodor Dostoevsky's novel The Gambler. It was slated to enter pre-production in 2017, and shooting would begin in Argentina in 2018, but no further news regarding the project emerged since then. On June 26, 2017, she expressed her desire to direct a film adaptation of Raphael Montes' 2014 thriller novel Dias Perfeitos. She was originally slated to return to television in 2018, to direct the upcoming telenovela Órfãos da Terra (initially known as Sal da Terra), by Duca Rachid and Thelma Guedes, who also wrote Joia Rara; however, this did not come to fruition. Her return to directing telenovelas eventually happened in 2019, with A Dona do Pedaço.

On December 19, 2016, it was reported that she began work on a miniseries based on Dostoevsky's The Brothers Karamazov, scheduled to be broadcast in 2018 by Rede Globo; Caio Blat and Carolina Dieckmann were being eyed to star. In 2017 she was chosen to direct the biographical miniseries Assédio, written by Maria Camargo and inspired by the non-fiction book A Clínica, by Vicente Vilardaga, about the life and crimes of rapist and former physician Roger Abdelmassih, who was portrayed by Antônio Calloni. The series' 10 episodes premiered on September 21, 2018, on Globo's streaming service Globoplay.

Despite her success, Mautner is often criticized by the actors she has worked with and other acquaintances as being too "strict" and "perfectionist". In 2017 it was reported that she fell out in favor with many of Rede Globo's telenovela writers, allegedly because of her "temperamental" demeanor, creative divergences with João Emanuel Carneiro and the lukewarm reception of A Regra do Jogo.

== Personal life ==
Mautner was married to actor Marcos Palmeira from 2005 to 2012. The couple had a daughter, Júlia, born 2007.

From 2014 to 2020 she was engaged to Arnon Affonso, son of former Brazilian President Fernando Collor.

== Filmography ==
=== Television ===
==== As actress ====
- 1991–92: Vamp – Paula
- 1992: Você Decide (season 1, episode 29)

==== As assistant director ====
- 1995: Malhação (season 1 only)
- 1996–97: Salsa e Merengue
- 1997–98: Anjo Mau
- 1998: Dona Flor e Seus Dois Maridos
- 1998: Labirinto
- 1999: Andando nas Nuvens

==== As director ====
- 2000–01: O Cravo e a Rosa
- 2001: Um Anjo Caiu do Céu
- 2002: Desejos de Mulher
- 2003: Agora É que São Elas
- 2003–04: Celebridade
- 2005: Mad Maria
- 2006: JK
- 2007: Paraíso Tropical
- 2008–09: Três Irmãs
- 2009–10: Cama de Gato
- 2010: As Cariocas
- 2011: Cordel Encantado
- 2012: Avenida Brasil
- 2013–14: Joia Rara
- 2014: Eu que Amo Tanto
- 2015–16: A Regra do Jogo
- 2018: Assédio
- 2019: A Dona do Pedaço
- 2021: Verdades Secretas 2
- 2023–24: Elas por Elas
- 2025: Êta Mundo Melhor!
- 2026: Quem Ama Cuida

=== Film ===
==== As director ====
- TBA: O Jogador
