= Berta Loran =

Polish-Brazilian actress (1926–2025)

- Born: Basza Ajs; 23 March 1926; Warsaw, Poland
- Died: 29 September 2025 (aged 99); Rio de Janeiro, Brazil
- Occupation: Actress
- Years active: 1952–2025
- Spouse(s): Suchar Handfuss (1946–1957); Júlio Marcos Jacoba (1963–1988); Paulo de Carvalho (1990–2016); Claudionor Vergueiro (2017–2025)
- Parents: Judka Ajs (father); Chaja Gitla Ajs (mother)

Basza Ajs (23 March 1926 – 29 September 2025), known professionally as Berta Loran, was a Polish-born Brazilian actress.

== Early life and career ==
Loran was born Basza Ajs on 23 March 1926 in Warsaw, to Jewish parents. She was born on Miła Street, where the Warsaw Ghetto would later be created. In order to flee from Nazism in Europe, Loran, who was only seven years old, and her family immigrated to Brazil in 1937. They lived in a multi-story house in Rio de Janeiro. In the 1940s, Loran's father encouraged her to pursue an acting career. It was then that she decided to use "Berta Loran" as her stage name.

Loran applied for Brazilian naturalization in March 1957. It was granted in August that year.

== Personal life and death ==
Loran's first husband was Suchar Handfuss, whom she married in 1951 for "professional interests". They did not have children, but she became pregnant twice from Handfuss. However, she aborted due to financial problems. At the age of 37, Loran married Júlio Jacoba, a merchant of Polish descent, who was introduced to her by her sister. They divorced in 1988.

Loran died on 29 September 2025, at the age of 99, in Rio de Janeiro.

== Selected filmography ==
- Amor com Amor Se Paga (1984)
- Você Decide (1995)
- Torre de Babel (1999)
- Cama de Gato (2009)
- Ti Ti Ti (2010)
- Cordel Encantado (2011)
- A Dona do Pedaço (2019)
