= Tatá Werneck =

Brazilian actress (born 1983)

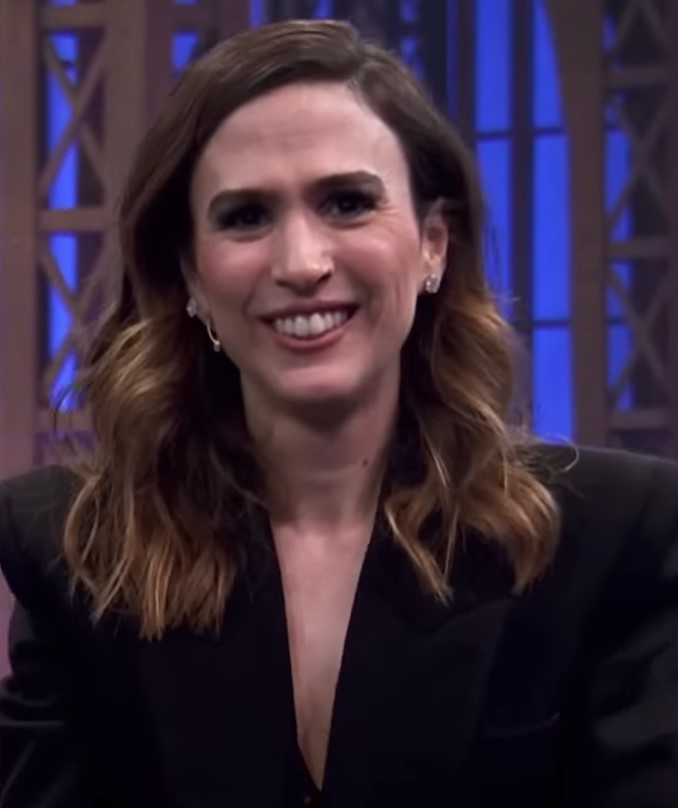
- Werneck in 2023
- Born: Talita Werneck Arguelhes; 11 August 1983 (age 43); Rio de Janeiro, Brazil
- Education: Pontifical Catholic University of Rio de Janeiro; Federal University of the State of Rio de Janeiro
- Occupations: Actress; television presenter; comedian; musician; voice actress; reporter
- Years active: 1994–present
- Height: 1.52 m (5 ft 0 in)
- Spouse: Rafael Vitti (m. 2019)
- Children: 1
- Musical career
- Genres: Rock
- Instruments: Vocals; drums; flute; piano; guitar
- Years active: 2012–present

Talita "Tatá" Werneck Arguelhes (Brazilian Portuguese: [taˈlitɐ taˈta veʁˈnɛki], German: [ˈvɛʁnɛk]; born August 11, 1983) is a Brazilian presenter, actress, comedian, musician, voice actress, screenwriter and reporter. She began her acting studies at just nine years old and, at eleven, she performed in her first theater show. Her debut on a televised program occurred in 2008, when she joined the cast of Dilemas de Irene. Two years later, she joined the Quinta Categoria team at MTV Brasil, having participated in several other programs on the network between 2010 and 2012.

Tatá only rose to fame in 2013, after passing the acting test, and obtaining the role of a comical piriguete who wanted to marry a rich man, in the soap opera Amor à Vida, broadcast on TV Globo. Her performance was hugely successful and made her the revelation of the year almost unanimously in the press. Such was the success that the artist was nominated for the American Shorty Awards and won several other national awards. Since then, the comedian has starred in programs on the Multishow channel, including the hit Vai Que Cola and the comedy Tudo pela Audiência, featuring it with comedian Fábio Porchat, as well as the soap opera I Love Paraisópolis, starring opposite Bruna Marquezine, again in the Globe. In 2016, Tatá performed successfully in Haja Coração - her third role in a serial in three years and, in February 2017, she debuted in theaters as the protagonist of TOC: Transtornada Obsessiva Compulsiva - her first film as a leading actress. With the premiere of Lady Night in April, Werneck became the first woman to host a late night talk show on a pay channel on Brazilian television. In 2018, she played the fun Lucrécia in Deus Salve o Rei, a seven o'clock soap opera on Globo.

In terms of acting, Tatá stands out for her skillful improvisation, and in May 2016, she was considered by journalist Nathália Carapeços, from the newspaper Zero Hora, "one of the main names in humor in the country". In 2010, the actress was elected the funniest comedian in the country by readers of the website Universo Online. In 2013, she received the nickname "Queen of Improviso" from the iG portal and, in 2014, she won the title of "Breakthrough Actress" in a poll carried out by Folha de S.Paulo with TV Globo viewers. Furthermore, she was named "Woman of the Year" by the Brazilian edition of the men's magazine GQ and became the first comedian to star in an advertisement for the cosmetics company L'Oréal. In May 2016, Capricho magazine named her "Queen of Comedy".

In addition to being an actress, Tatá has been the vocalist of a musical group called Renatinho, since 2015, and actively works in defense of animal protection and the social inclusion of people with disabilities, having been one of the founders of the first Brazilian theater group to produce plays accessible to those, called Os Inclusos e os Sisos - Mobilization Theater for Diversity.

== Career ==
She began her acting studies at the age of 9 and subsequently appeared in her first theatrical performance at 11. Her debut in a televised program occurred in 2008, when she joined the cast of Dilemas de Irene. Two years later, she joined the team of Quinta Categoria, formerly MTV Brasil, and participated in several other station's programs between 2010 and 2012.

Werneck only found nationwide fame in 2013, after landing the role of a comedic hoochie Valdirene who longed to marry a rich man in the soap opera Amor à Vida, broadcast by Rede Globo, Brazil's main television station. Its performance achieved huge success and consecrated it as the revelation of the year almost unanimously in the press. Since then, the comedian starred in programs on Multishow, including the successful Vai Que Cola and the comedy Tudo pela Audiência, which she co-host with the comedian Fábio Porchat. Werneck featured in the soap opera I Love Paraisópolis, starring opposite model and actress Bruna Marquezine. Currently, Werneck plays Fedora Abdalla in Haja Coração.

In terms of performance, Werneck stands out for her skillful improvisation and is considered one of the most well known comedic performers in Brazil. In 2010, the actress was voted the funniest comedian in the country by readers of website Universo Online. In 2013, she received the nickname "Queen of Improvisation" by iG and in 2014, she won the title of "Best Breakthrough" in a poll conducted by Folha de S.Paulo with Rede Globo viewers. In addition, she was named "Woman of the Year" by the Brazilian edition of men's magazine GQ and became the first comedian to star in a cosmetic advert when appearing for L'Oréal. In May 2016, magazine Capricho named her the "Queen of Comedy".

Besides acting, Werneck is the lead singer of a musical group called "Renatinho", since 2012, and actively participates in animal protection and welfare campaigns, as well as the inclusion of disabled participants in theatre. She was one of the founders of the first theatre group to produce affordable pieces to disabled people, called Os Inclusos e os Sisos – Mobilisation Theatre for Diversity.

== Professional life ==
=== Early career ===
In 2004 Werneck started, with her university classmates, a theatre group called "Os Inclusos e os sisos"- Theatre Mobilisation for Diversity, which was the first Brazilian group to create a totally accessible play for disabled people.

=== MTV and national recognition ===
Werneck was also a comedian on MTV, where she began to build experience. Apart from that, Werneck acted in some cinematic productions, such as the film "Teste de Elenco".

In February 2013, Werneck signed her first contract with Rede Globo to act in a soap opera.

== Filmography ==
Soap Operas
Year	Title	Role	Original network
2013–14	Amor à Vida	Valdirene do Espírito Santo	Rede Globo
2014–15	Alto Astral	Herself	Rede Globo
2015	I Love Paraisópolis	Pandora "Danda" Balbino	Rede Globo
2016	Totalmente Demais	Fedora "Fefê" Abdala Varella	Rede Globo
2016	Haja Coração	Fedora "Fefê" Abdala Varella	Rede Globo
2017–18	Pega Pega	Herself	Rede Globo
2018	Deus Salve o Rei	Lucrécia de Vila Rosso, Princesz of Alcaluz	Rede Globo
2022–23	Cara e Coragem	Herself	Rede Globo
2023–24	Terra e Paixão	Anely do Carmo	Rede Globo
2024	No Rancho Fundo	Herself	Rede Globo
2026	Quem Ama Cuida	Brigitte Brandão	Rede Globo

Television
Year	Title	Original network
1994	Xuxa Park	Rede Globo
2008	Dilemas de Irene	GNT
2010–11	Quinta Categoría	MTV
2010–12	Comédia MTV	MTV
2010	Furo MTV	MTV
2010	Infortúnio com a Funérea	MTV
2011	Acesso MTV	MTV
2011	MTV Video Music Brasil	MTV
2011	Luv MTV	MTV
2012	Vai pra Praia Que o Pariu	MTV
2012	Furo MTV	MTV
2012	Comédia MTV ao Vivo	MTV
2012	Trolalá	MTV
2012	MTV Video Music Brasil	MTV
2012	Família Imperial	Canal Futura
2012	Astros	SBT
2013	Tá Quente	MTV
2013	Sem Análise	Multishow
2013	Fantástico	TV Globo
2013	Caldeirão do Huck	TV Globo
2013	Roberto Carlos Especial	TV Globo
2014	Big Brother Brasil 14	TV Globo
2014	Vem Aí	TV Globo
2014	Caldeirão do Huck	TV Globo
2014	Prêmio Multishow de Música Brasileira	Multishow
2014–17	Vai que Cola	Multishow
2014–16	Tudo pela Audiência	Multishow
2016	O Estranho Show De Renatinho	Multishow
2016	Vídeo Show	TV Globo
2016	TVZ Ao Vivo	Multishow
2016–present	Prêmio Multishow de Música Brasileira	Multishow
2017–present	Lady Night	Multishow
2017–18	Caldeirão de Ouro	TV Globo
2019	Shippados	Globoplay
2020	Lady and Bofe	Multishow
2022	The Masked Singer Brasil	TV Globo

Films
Year	Title	Role
2010	Podía Ser Pior	Talita
2011	Teste de Elenco	Tay
2012	De Pernas pro Ar 2	Juliana
2014	Planes: Fire & Rescue	Lil Dipper (Brazilian voice)
2015	Loucas Pra Casar	Maria
2016	The Secret Life of Pets	Gigi / Gidget (Brazilian voice)
2017	TOC: Transtornada Obsessiva Compulsiva	Kika K / Francisca
2018	Uma Quase Dupla	Keyla
2023	Minha Irmã e Eu	Mirelly
2024	Inside Out 2	Anxiety (Brazilian voice)

== Awards and nominations ==
Year	Award	Category	Title of Work	Result	Ref.
2013	Prêmio Extra de Televisão	Best Female Revelation	Amor à Vida	Won	
2013	Meus Prêmios Nick	Favorite Actress	Amor à Vida	Nominated	
2013	Prêmio Quem de Televisão	Revelation	Amor à Vida	Won	
2013	Melhores do Ano	Best Female Revelation	Amor à Vida	Won	
2013	Capricho Awards	Best Actress	Amor à Vida	Won	
2013	APCA Awards	Best Actress	Amor à Vida	Nominated	
2013	UOL	Best Male/Female Revelation	Amor à Vida	Won	
2014	Troféu Imprensa	Revelation of Year	Amor à Vida	Won	
2014	Troféu Internet	Revelation of Year	Amor à Vida	Won	
2014	Prêmio Contigo! de TV	Revelation	Amor à Vida	Won	
