= It's a Match =

Brazilian television series

- Portuguese: Shippados
- Genre: Romantic comedy
- Created by: Alexandre Machado; Fernanda Young
- Starring: Tatá Werneck; Eduardo Sterblitch; Luis Lobianco; Clarice Falcão; Júlia Rabello; Rafael Queiroga; Yara de Novaes
- Opening theme: "Estive" by Vanguart
- Country of origin: Brazil
- Original language: Portuguese
- No. of seasons: 1
- No. of episodes: 12

Production
- Production location: Rio de Janeiro
- Production company: Rede Globo

Original release
- Network: Globoplay
- Release: June 7, 2019

It's a Match (Portuguese: Shippados) is a Brazilian romantic comedy streaming television series that premiered on Globoplay on June 7, 2019. Starring Tatá Werneck and Eduardo Sterblitch, the series takes a comedic look at relationships through social media and dating apps.

== Premise ==
Rita (Tatá Werneck) is always looking for a boyfriend and often resorting to dating apps for that. After a disastrous encounter, she meets Enzo (Eduardo Sterblitch) in a bar and the two perceive that they have many things in common – even bad luck at love.

== Cast ==
- Tatá Werneck as Rita Lima
- Eduardo Sterblitch as Enzo Trindade
- Luis Lobianco as Valdir
- Clarice Falcão as Brita
- Júlia Rabello as Suzete
- Rafael Queiroga as Hélio
- Yara de Novaes as Dolores Lima

== Episodes ==
No.	Title	Original release date
1	"Você shippa?"	June 7, 2019
2	"Bugados"	June 7, 2019
3	"Deletados"	June 7, 2019
4	"Tiltados"	June 7, 2019
5	"Trollados"	June 7, 2019
6	"Flopados"	June 7, 2019
7	"Logados"	June 7, 2019
8	"Linkados"	June 7, 2019
9	"Desconectados"	June 7, 2019
10	"Bloqueados"	June 7, 2019
11	"Plugados"	June 7, 2019
12	"Zoados"	June 7, 2019
