= Luana Martau =

Brazilian actress

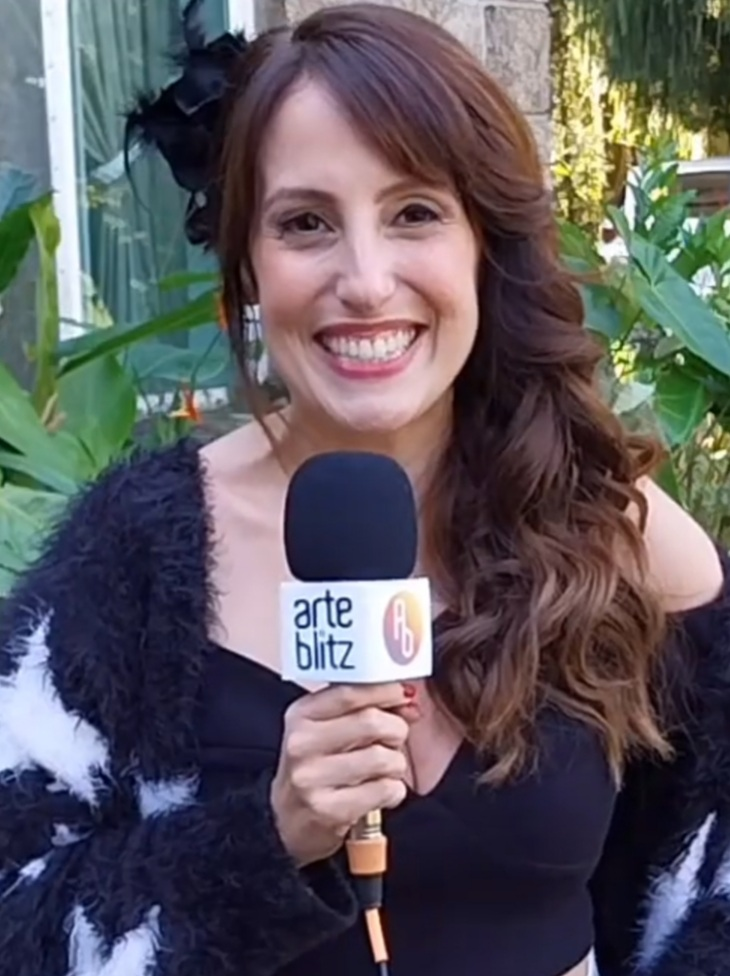
- Martau in 2023
- Born: Luana Luz Martau; December 20, 1984 (age 41); Porto Alegre, Rio Grande do Sul, Brazil
- Citizenship: Brazilian
- Education: Casa das Artes de Laranjeiras; Federal University of Rio de Janeiro
- Occupation: Actress
- Height: 1.55 m (5 ft 1 in)

Luana Luz Martau (December 20, 1984) is a Brazilian actress. She is known for her appearances on TV Globo and for being part of the network's humour team.

== Biography ==
=== Early years and education ===
She was born in Porto Alegre, the capital of Rio Grande do Sul, in 1984. She moved to Rio de Janeiro to become an actress, where she studied performing arts at Casa das Artes de Laranjeiras, a traditional college located in the Laranjeiras neighborhood. She later studied theater directing at the Federal University of Rio de Janeiro (UFRJ).

=== Career ===
Her debut as a television actress was in the soap opera Cama de Gato, which aired on TV Globo, where she played Patrícia Maldonado. The following year, he was part of the cast of the series Clandestinos: o Sonho Começou, which also aired on TV Globo. In 2011, she joined the cast of the soap opera Cordel Encatando, where she played Lady Carlota de Bragança. For her strong performance in the role, she was nominated for the Prêmio Extra de Televisão, organized by the newspaper Extra, in the category of Best Breakout Actress. The award was won by actress Thalita Carauta. In 2012, she played Beverly, a manicurist, in the soap opera Avenida Brasil.

She has appeared in comedy series on TV Globo, including Loucos Por Elas and Diário de Um Confinado, the latter of which was nominated for a 2021 International Emmy Award. It aired for all six seasons of the comedy show Tá no Ar, between 2014 and 2019. Although she is a regular on the series, the actress has appeared in the network's soap operas, including Joia Rara, I Love Paraisópolis, and Órfãos da Terra.

In 2022, she joined the cast of No Mundo da Luna, an original television series airing on HBO Max. In 2024, she was part of the cast of 5x Comédia, an original Amazon Prime Video series. That same year, he joined the cast of the second season of the series Matches, which aired on Warner Channel. Later in 2024, she joined the cast of Dra. Darci, a comedy show on Multishow. She returned to TV Globo when she joined the series Tô Nessa. After seven years, she returned to soap operas, starring in Walcyr Carrasco’s Quem Ama Cuida, where she plays Matilde de Sousa, a maid who aspires to be a digital influencer.

== Filmography ==
=== Television ===
Year	Title	Character	Note(s)	Ref.
2009	Cama de Gato	Patrícia Lombardi		
2010	Clandestinos: o Sonho Começou	Luana		
2011	Cordel Encantado	Lady Carlota de Bragança		
2012	Avenida Brasil	Maria da Purificação de Jesus (Beverly Hills)		
2013	Louco por Elas	Dorothy		
2013	Joia Rara	Creotina (Cléo)		
2014–2019	Tá no Ar	Various characters		
2015	I Love Paraisópolis	Mirela Recanto de Queiroz		
2019	Órfãos da Terra	Latifa / Rebeca Blum		
2020	Fora de Hora	Various characters		
2020	Diário de Um Confinado	Marcinha	Episode: "Date"	
2020	Simples Assim	Danuza	Episode: "5 de dezembro"	
2022	No Mundo da Luna	Micaela		
2024	5x Comédia	Eulália Tavares	Episode: "Amor em Tempo de Pets"	
2024–present	Matches	Camila Fernandes (Mila)		
2024–present	Dra. Darci	Erika Santos		
2024	Tô Nessa	Mariana (Mari)		
2026	Quem Ama Cuida	Matilde de Sousa (Tilde)		

=== Cinema ===
Year	Title	Character	Note(s)	Ref.
2014	A Noite da Virada	Alê		
2015	S.O.S. Mulheres ao Mar 2	Host of the fashion show		
2016	A Canção de Lisboa	Alice		
2017	Chocante	Reporter		
2021	Just Short of Perfect	Corina		
2023	Desapega!	Nina		
2023	Feliz Ano Novo... De Novo	Tatá		
2024	Dois É Demais em Orlando	Clara		

== Prizes ==
Year	Prize	Category	Work	Result	Ref.
2011	Prêmio Extra de Televisão	Best Breakout Actress	Cordel Encantado	Nominated	

== Personal life ==
She has been married to music producer Ricco Vianna since 2005. The couple has a daughter, Nina. She's a Fluminense FC fan.
