= O Circo das Qualidades Humanas =

2000 film directed by Geraldo Veloso

- Directed by: Milton Alencar; Paulo Augusto Gomes; Geraldo Veloso; Jorge Moreno
- Written by: Cunha de Leiradella
- Produced by: Jorge Moreno
- Starring: Daniel de Oliveira; Eduardo Largo; Thaís Garayp; Francisco Milani; Jonas Bloch; Paula Burlamaqui; Stênio Garcia
- Cinematography: Philipe Gerling
- Edited by: Maria Muricy
- Music by: Vander Lima
- Production company: Fam Cine
- Release dates: January 21, 2000 (Tiradentes); August 13, 2004 (theatrical release)
- Running time: 93 minutes
- Country: Brazil
- Language: Portuguese
- Budget: R$1.6 million

O Circo das Qualidades Humanas is a 2000 Brazilian drama film directed by Milton Alencar, Paulo Augusto Gomes, Geraldo Veloso, and Jorge Moreno. It was shot in December 1998 in Congonhas, Minas Gerais, and debuted at the 3rd Festival de Cinema de Tiradentes in 2000.

== Plot ==
On a Sunday morning, Ulysses, Maria Germana, Eduardo and the cronies Carioca and Preto arrive in Congonhas, Minas Gerais. Each of them has a different reason to come to the town: some personal, others professional. Ulysses was born there. Living an identity crisis, he decides to return to his hometown in a quest to find himself. Maria Germana is a shooting model that comes to Congonhas because of a photographic session. She gets interested in Ulysses after seeing him in a bar. Eduardo is an engineer whom also came because of professional reasons. He ends up falling in love with a mysterious woman named Helena, whom he met in the streets of the city. Carioca and Preto came to search for Chicão, with who they plan to have a reckoning. Besides them, there is Bosco, a young man that has returned home recently after a period recovering from substances dependency. He struggles with family problems, such as the sexual harassment from his sister, and the despise from his father.

== Cast ==
- Daniel de Oliveira.... Bosco
- Eduardo Lago.... José Ulysses de Almeida
- Thaís Garayp.... D. Geralda
- Francisco Milani.... Seu Antônio
- Stênio Garcia.... Chicão
- Henrique Pires.... Carioca
- Romeu Evaristo.... Preto
- Jonas Bloch.... Eduardo da Cunha Junior
- Elvécio Guimarães.... Jofre
- Rogério Cardoso.... Seu Nilo
- Cléo Carmona .... Maria Germana
- Selma Mello .... Joyce
- Márcia Barros .... Jussara
- Paula Burlamaqui.... Helena
- Maria Olívia .... Tia Prisciliana
- Regina Bahia .... Aurentina
- Geraldo Carrato .... Marcos
- Carl Schumacher.... Silviano
- Luiz Arthur .... Fábio
- Michele Castro .... Marilene
- Cristina Rizzo .... Janaína
- Eduardo Peixoto .... Noca
- Jeane Terra .... Marlene
- Eduardo Villa .... Dudu
- Cássia Kiss
