= Ronny Kriwat =

Brazilian actor (born 1987)

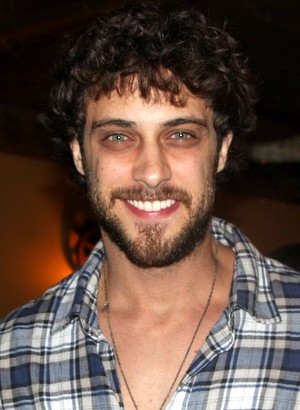
- Kriwat in July 2015
- Born: 31 March 1987 (age 39); São Paulo, Brazil
- Occupation: Actor
- Years active: 2009–present

Ronny Kriwat (born 31 March 1987) is a Brazilian actor.

Kriwat studied Business Administration at Mackenzie, in São Paulo. For being a little shy, he decided to take theater classes to lose his shyness. He liked the stage and began to invest in his career. In 2009, he made his television debut in the telenovela Cama de Gato.

== Filmography ==
=== Television ===
Year	Title	Role	Notes
2009–2010	Cama de Gato	Pedro de Britto Brandão	
2010–2011	Malhação	Theo Lopes	Season 18
2012	Avenida Brasil	Tomás Buarque Queiroz	
2014	Em Família	Laerte Soares Fernandes Jr. (Leto)	
2014	Malhação	Franz	Guest appearance; season 22
2017	O Rico e Lázaro	Gedaliah	First phase
2017	Apocalipse	Augusto Santero Sardes (Guto)	
2018–2019	Rio Heroes	Pipo	
2018	Jesus	Caiaphas (young)	First phase
2019	Jezabel	Eliseu Yak	
2021	Gênesis	Eliezer	
2027	Avenida Brasil 2	Tomás Buarque Queiroz	

=== Film ===
Year	Title	Role	Notes
2009	Eu e Crocodilos	Edu	Short film
2016	Memória do Amor	Him	Short film

== Theater ==
Year	Title	Ref.
2009	Perfídia	
2013–2014	A Minha Primeira Vez	
2015	A-Traídos	
2015–2016	Três na Pista	
