= Cidade Proibida =

Brazilian television series

- Genre: Dramedy
- Created by: Mauro Wilson
- Based on: O Corno Que Sabia Demais by Wander Antunes
- Written by: Ângela Chaves; Flávio Araújo; Marcio Alemão; Nilton Braga; Flávia Bessone; Adriana Falcão; Bíbi Da Pieve; Emanuel Jacobina; Max Mallmann
- Directed by: Maurício Farias
- Starring: Vladimir Brichta; Regiane Alves; José Loreto; Aílton Graça; Adriana Lessa; Maurício Rizzo
- Opening theme: "Instrumental"
- Country of origin: Brazil
- Original language: Portuguese
- No. of seasons: 1
- No. of episodes: 12

Original release
- Network: Rede Globo
- Release: 26 September – 19 December 2017

Cidade Proibida (English title: Forbidden City) is a Brazilian television series that aired on Rede Globo from 9 September 2017 to 19 December 2017. The series is based on the comic book series O Corno Que Sabia Demais, written by Wander Antunes. It stars Vladimir Brichta, Regiane Alves, José Loreto, Aílton Graça, Adriana Lessa, and Maurício Rizzo.

A second season was planned, however, it was cancelled due to the low ratings of the series.

== Premise ==
Set in Rio de Janeiro in the 1950s, the series follows Zózimo Barbosa, a former police officer who becomes a detective specializing in cases of adultery. He is accompanied by call girl Marli, police officer Paranhos, and trickster Bonitão.

== Cast ==
- Vladimir Brichta as Zózimo Barbosa
- Regiane Alves as Marli
- José Loreto as Adalberto Cruz "Bonitão"
- Aílton Graça as Paranhos
- Adriana Lessa as Gracinda
- Maurício Rizzo as Diogo Freitas
