= Avenida Brasil (TV series) =

Brazilian telenovela by João Emanuel Carneiro

- Genre: Telenovela; Mystery; Crime drama; Thriller; Dark comedy
- Created by: João Emanuel Carneiro
- Directed by: Ricardo Waddington; Amora Mautner; José Luiz Villamarim
- Starring: Murilo Benício; Débora Falabella; Cauã Reymond; Alexandre Borges; Vera Holtz; José de Abreu; Nathalia Dill; Ísis Valverde; Heloísa Périssé; Marcelo Novaes; Fabíula Nascimento; Otávio Augusto; Paula Burlamaqui; Carol Abras; Bruno Gissoni; Thiago Martins; Débora Nascimento; Juliano Cazarré; José Loreto; Jean Pierre Noher; Felipe Abib; Bianca Comparato; Cacau Protásio; Daniel Rocha; Ronny Kriwat; Cláudia Missura; Patrícia de Jesus; Leticia Isnard; Luana Martau; Marcella Valente; Emiliano D'Ávila; Mel Maia; Débora Bloch; Juca de Oliveira; Carolina Ferraz; Eliane Giardini; Camila Morgado; Betty Faria; Marcos Caruso; Ailton Graça; Adriana Esteves; Tony Ramos
- Opening theme: "Vem Dançar Com Tudo" by Robson Moura and Lino Krizz
- Composer: Eduardo Queiroz
- Country of origin: Brazil
- Original language: Portuguese
- No. of episodes: 179 (original run); 160 (international)

Production
- Production locations: Rio de Janeiro, Brazil
- Camera setup: Multiple-camera setup
- Running time: 35–55 minutes
- Production company: Central Globo de Produção

Original release
- Network: Rede Globo
- Release: 26 March – 19 October 2012

Related
- Avenida Brasil 2

Avenida Brasil (English: Brazil Avenue) is a Brazilian primetime telenovela created by João Emanuel Carneiro. It was written by Carneiro in collaboration with Antonio Prata, Luciana Pessanha, Alessandro Marson, Marcia Prates and Thereza Falcão, and directed by José Luiz Villamarim, Amora Mautner, and Ricardo Waddington. It stars an ensemble cast consisting of Murilo Benício, Débora Falabella, Cauã Reymond, Alexandre Borges, Vera Holtz, José de Abreu, Nathalia Dill, Ísis Valverde, Heloísa Périssé, Marcelo Novaes, Fabíula Nascimento, Otávio Augusto, Paula Burlamaqui, Carol Abras, Bruno Gissoni, Thiago Martins, Débora Nascimento, Juliano Cazarré, Felipe Abib, Bianca Comparato, Cacau Protásio, Daniel Rocha, Ronny Kriwat, Cláudia Missura, Patrícia de Jesus, Leticia Isnard, Luana Martau, Marcella Valente, Emiliano D'Ávila, Mel Maia, Débora Bloch, Juca de Oliveira, Carolina Ferraz, Eliane Giardini, Camila Morgado, Betty Faria, Marcos Caruso, Ailton Graça, Adriana Esteves, and Tony Ramos. Avenida Brasil premiered on 26 March 2012 and ended on 19 October 2012 on TV Globo.

The telenovela achieved an overall daily average of more than 50 million viewers, becoming the most watched TV program of the year. It quickly became the most commercially successful telenovela in Brazilian history, with Forbes estimating $1 billion in total earnings for Globo thanks to its international success in Latin America, Europe and Africa.

Nominated for 118 prizes, winning 41, Avenida Brasil was also nominated for Best Telenovela at the 41st International Emmy Awards, losing to another TV Globo telenovela Side by Side (Lado a Lado).

== Plot ==
The plot follows the dramatic story of Rita (Débora Falabella as an adult, Mel Maia as a child), a sweet young woman who struggles to recover part of the life her ruthless gold digging stepmother, Carminha (Adriana Esteves), took from her when she was only a child. When Rita's father dies accidentally and prematurely at the hand of Tufão (Murilo Benício) but directly related to Carminha's scheme, Carminha and her lover, Max (Marcello Novaes), send the young girl off to live in a landfill, so that she doesn't stand in the way of their plan to get rich. Carminha uses this fact to trap Tufão into a guilt ridden marriage unknowingly. At the landfill, Rita is subjected to child labor under the control of a deplorable man, Nilo (José de Abreu), but she is lucky enough to meet Batata (Cauã Reymond), a boy who becomes her best friend and true love. He takes her to live with other children, under the care of motherly Lucinda (Vera Holtz), in another house at the landfill. Fortunately, Rita is soon adopted and moves out of the country to Argentina with a nice family who changes her name to Nina. However, she has issues with her adoptive mother who passes away and eventually with her adoptive sisters because of her mission of revenge. Rita/Nina's adoptive father loved her very much and treated her well. He educated her and provided for his family nicely. She becomes a famous chef. When her adoptive father dies, it intensifies her loss of her natural father and revenge for Carminha and Max. Batata is adopted by Carminha and Tufão and they rename him Jorginho. Jorginho has many emotional issues because his birth mother adopts him years after she abandons him at the landfilled as a toddler. Jorginho despises Caminha but he doesn't know why and he does not remember her clearly from his early childhood before the abandonment.

Years later, unrecognizable and motivated by vengeance, Nina moves back to Brazil under her adoptive name and infiltrates Carminha's family by becoming their personal chef. Eventually, she must face the bitter consequences of seeking revenge against those who hurt her the most. As mentioned above, vile Carminha has managed to lure and marry Tufão, who is a friendly, rich football player and is unaware of her many lies and manipulations. They live with his loud and garish relatives in an unrefined suburban mansion and, underhandedly, she makes the evil Max her brother-in-law by marrying him to Tufão's annoying sister. Together, Carminha and Max continue to carry out their sadistic plans to get ahead while continuing their love/hate affair in the same house as their unsuspecting spouses. Nina becomes so engrossed in her single-minded goal to inflict suffering and punishment on those who wronged her that her own happiness is jeopardized. Carminha and Nina have one thing in common: their earnest love for Jorginho, who is Carminha's biological son (and adoptive son) and Nina's childhood sweetheart, Batata.

Nina uses Max and become entangled, which irritates Carminha for her loss of love interest. Subsequently, Nina helps Max by giving ransom with interest for her kin. Day-to-day Max demands money, Nina finally is unable to help him and Max realizes that she doesn't love him. Devastated, Max agrees to Carminha for overwhelming Nina. Soon after, Nina stealthily takes a picture of themselves on their bed – threatens Carminha. The photos are used to blackmail Carminha until she tactically steals them from Nina's cache and announces the identity of Nina for Tufão's family. Tufão confuses but tend to believe Carminha's statement, with Nina no hope to describe what she is. Upon Max convincing Carminha to leave the mansion, she betrays him to death-trap from drowning him in his boat but timely survived by his mother Lucinda. Max disguises and manages to reveal Nina's photo to Tufão family at which Carminha is fired. The big event is that Max kidnaps Nina, soon dead Nilo, Lucinda, Carminha and Jorginio. At that time, Max uses Nina as a human shield for escape, but someone repeatedly knocks unconscious and kills him using a spade. Carminha swears about the murder of Max and is sentenced three years. The later series shows Carminha returning from jail and reconciling to Nina.

== Cast ==
=== Main ===
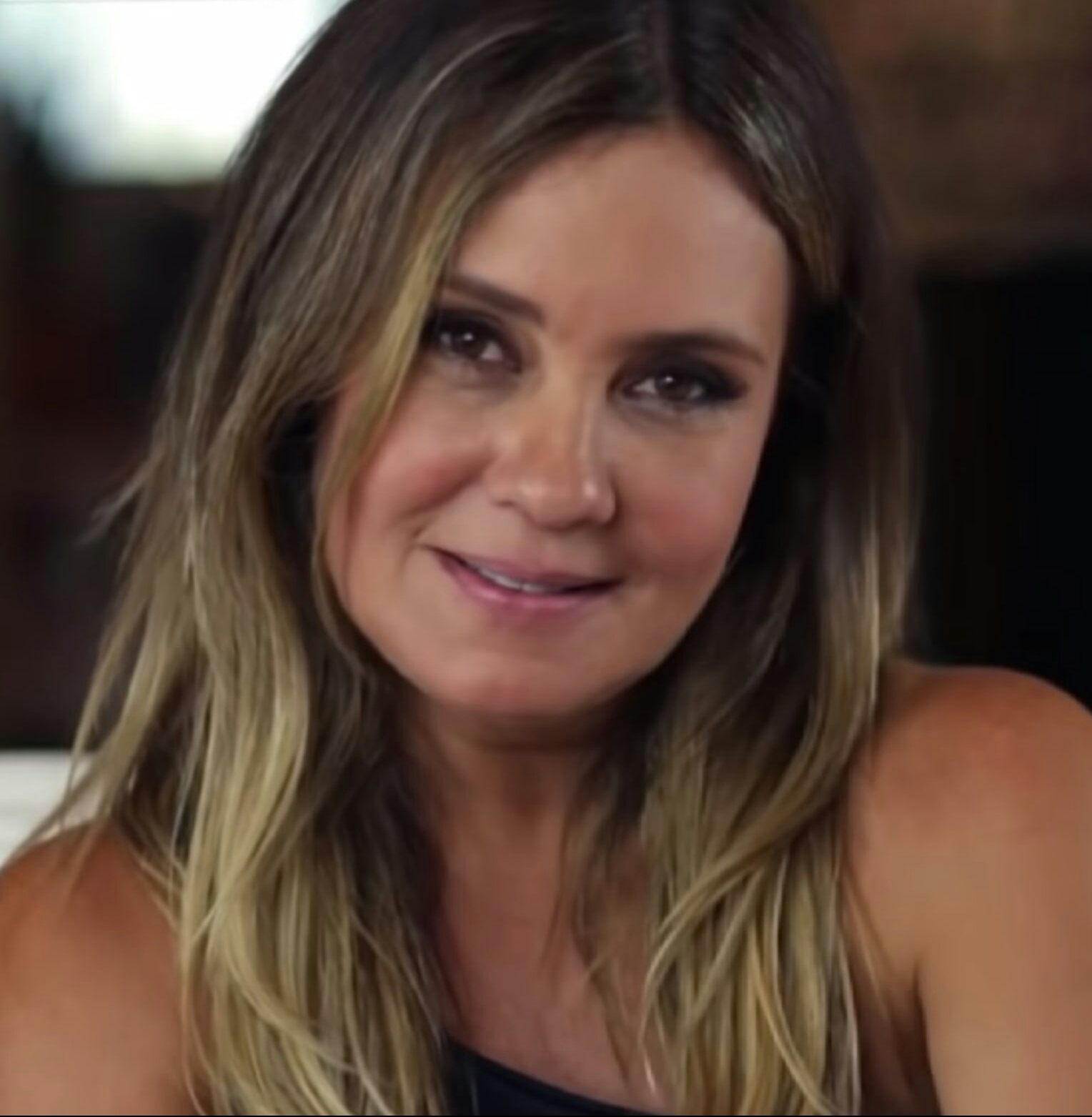
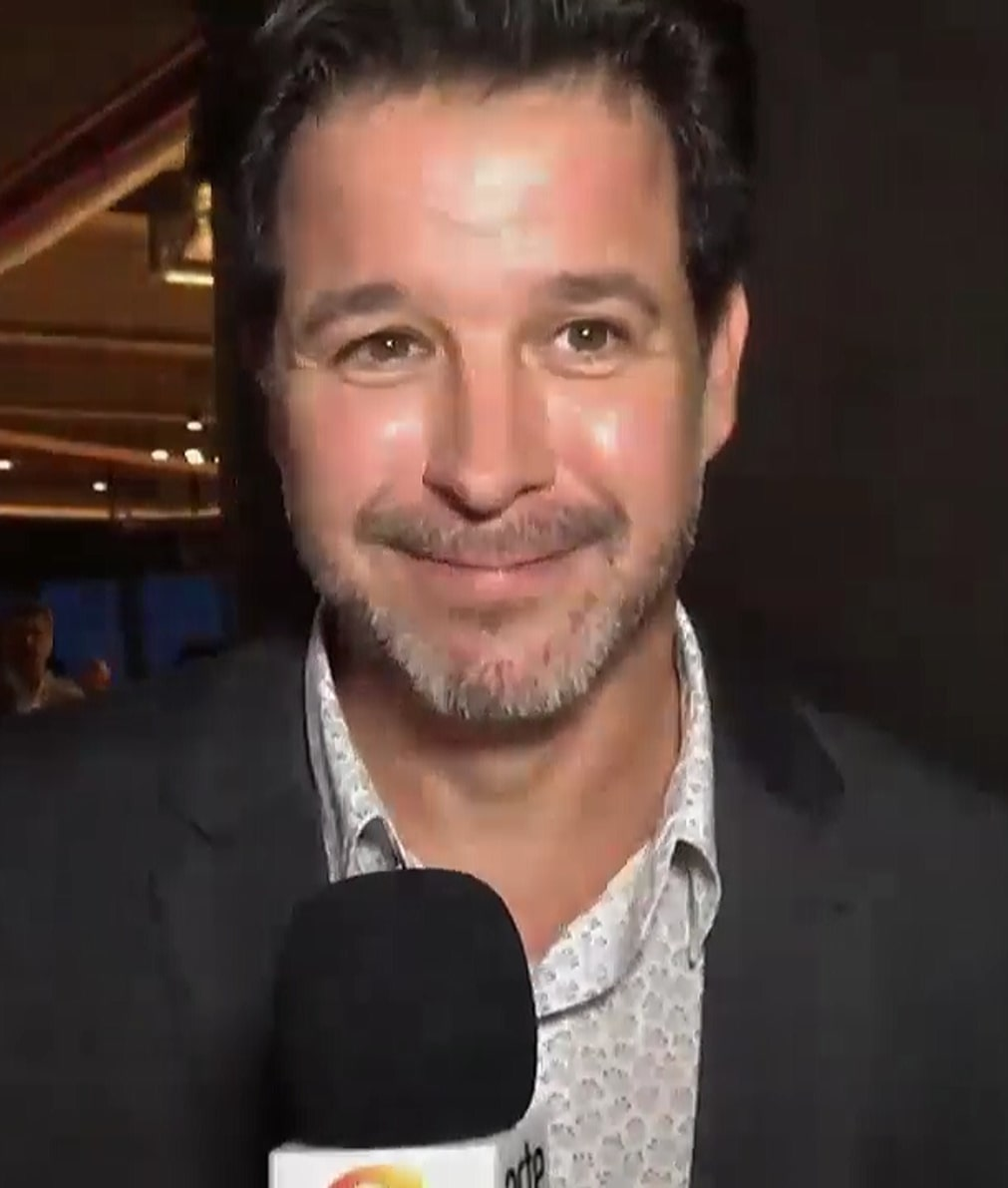
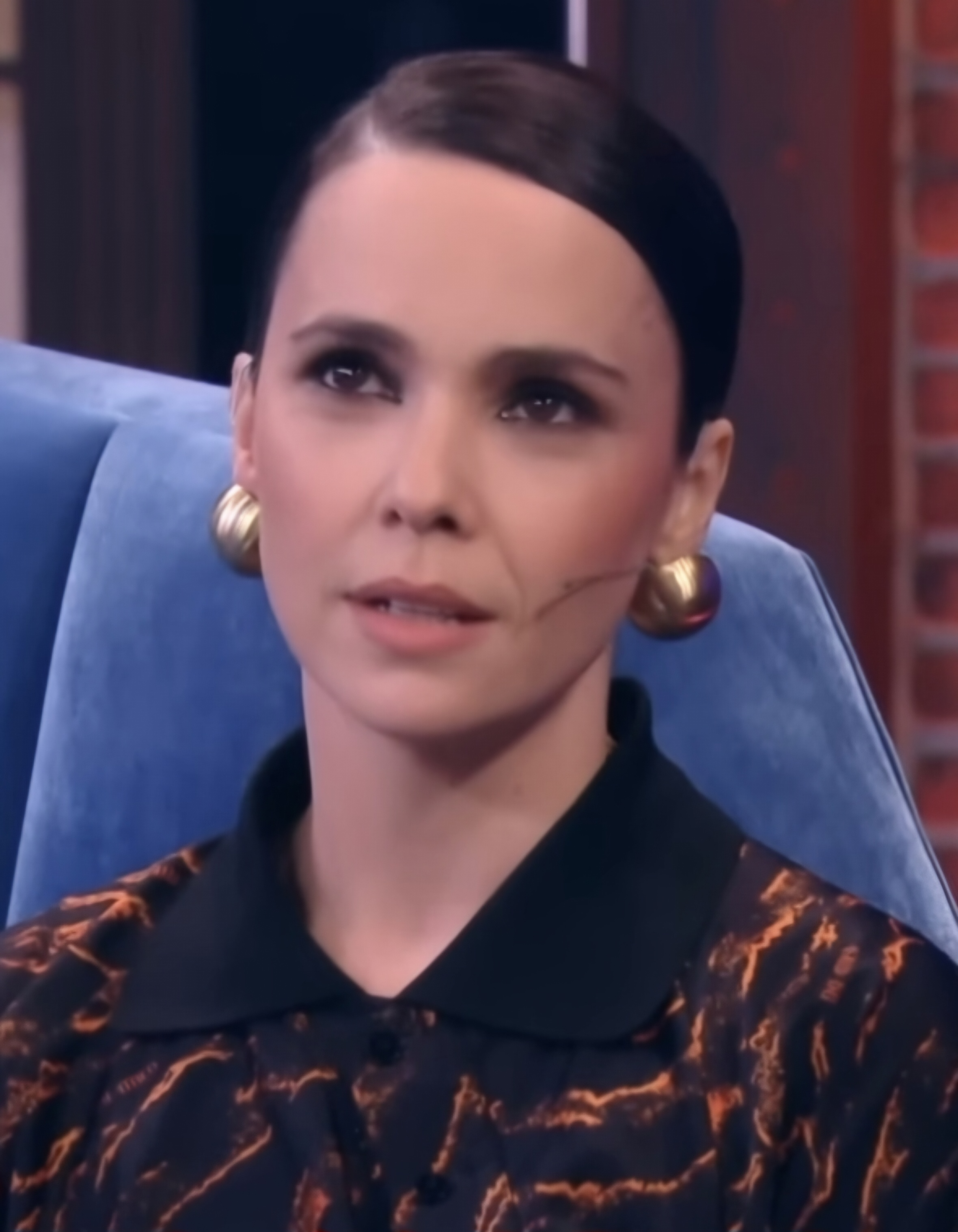
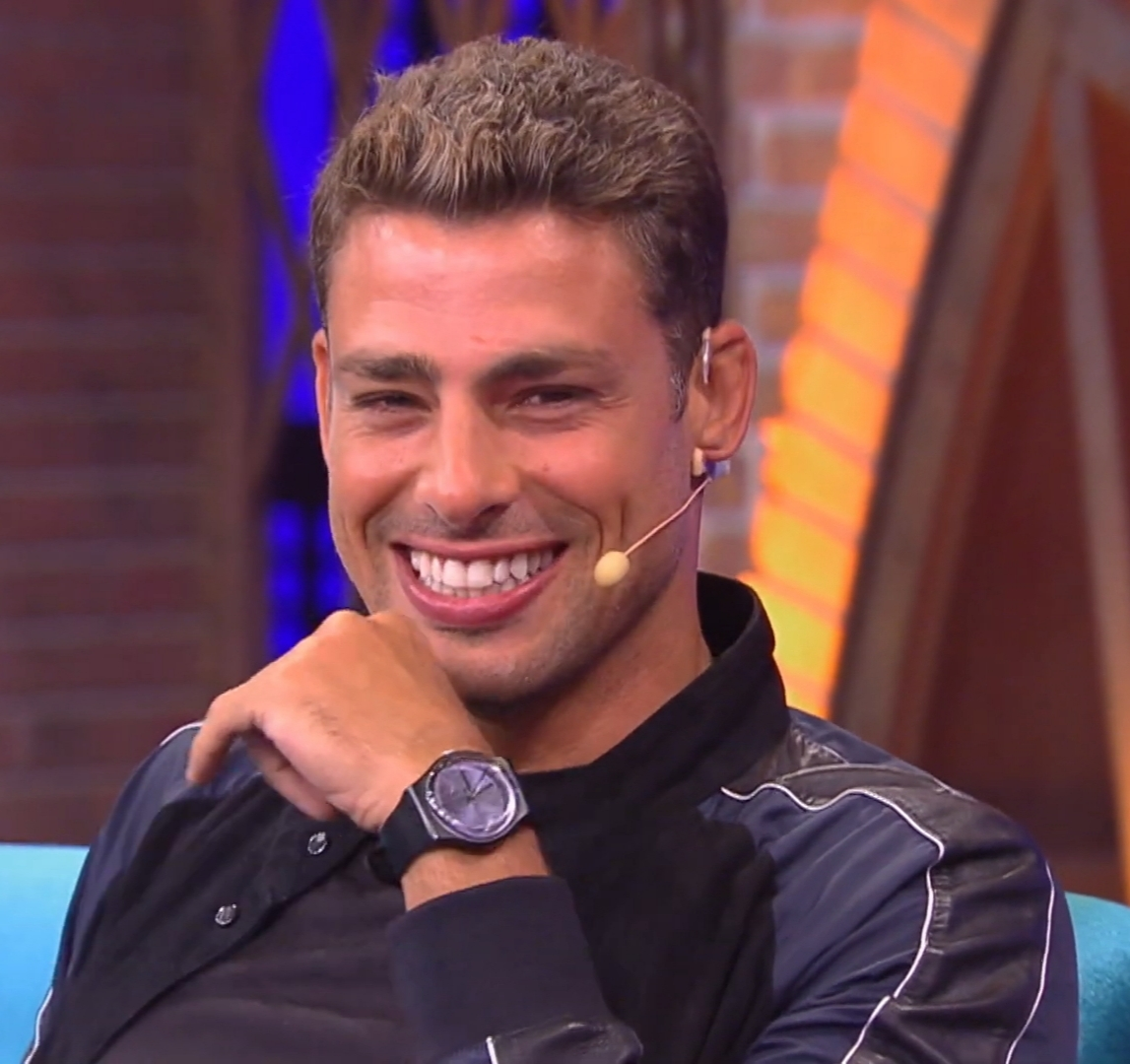
(L-R) Adriana Esteves, Murilo Benício, Débora Falabella, and Cauã Reymond, stars of Avenida Brasil
- Adriana Esteves as Carminha (Carmen Lucia Moreira de Souza Araújo)
- Murilo Benício as Tufão (Jorge Araújo), Carminha's husband
- Débora Falabella as Rita Fonseca de Souza / Nina García Hernández, Carminha's stepdaughter
  - Mel Maia as a young Rita
- Cauã Reymond as Jorginho (Jorge Moreira de Araújo Filho / Cristiano Oliveira / Batata), Carminha's biological son, Tufão's adopted son, and Nina's childhood love interest
- Alexandre Borges as Cadinho / Dudu (Carlos Eduardo de Souza Queirós)
- Vera Holtz as Mom Lucina (Lucinda Pereira), Rita's caretaker and Jorginho's grandmother
- José de Abreu as Nilo Oliveira, Lucinda's ex husband and Jorginho's grandfather
- Nathalia Dill as Débora Magalhães Queirós, Jorginho's girlfriend and Cadinho's daughter
- Ísis Valverde as Suelen
- Heloísa Périssé as Monalisa Barbosa, Tufão's ex girlfriend
- Marcello Novaes as Max (Maxwell Pereira Oliveira), Carminha's lover, Jorginho's biological father, and son of Lucinda and Nilo
- Fabíula Nascimento as Olenka Cabral, Monalisa's best friend
- Otávio Augusto as Diógenes
- Paula Burlamaqui as Dolores Neiva / Soninha Catatau, Diógenes' ex wife
- Carol Abras as Begonia García Hernández, Nina's adoptive sister
- Bruno Gissoni as Iran Barbosa, Monalisa's adopted son
- Thiago Martins as Leandro
- Débora Nascimento as Tessália das Graças Mendonça
- Juliano Cazarré as Adauto
- José Loreto as Darkson Silas
- Jean Pierre Noher as Martin García Hernández, Nina's adoptive father
- Felipe Abib as Jimmy Bastos, Cadinho's assistant
- Bianca Comparato as Betânia de Almeida, Nina's childhood friend
- Cacau Protásio as Zezé, a maid for Tufão's family
- Daniel Rocha as Roni "Roniquito", son of Diógenes and Dolores
- Ronny Kriwat as Tomás Buarque, Cadinho's son
- Cláudia Missura as Janaína, a maid for Tufão's family
- Patrícia de Jesus as Jéssica
- Leticia Isnard as Ivana Araújo, Tufão's sister and Max's wife
- Luana Martau as Beverly, a friend of Monalisa and Olenka
- Marcella Valente as Renata
- Emiliano D'Ávila as Lúcio, Janaína's son
- Débora Bloch as Verônica Magalhães Queirós, Débora's mother and one of Cadinho's wives
- Juca de Oliveira as Santiago, Lucinda's lover and Carminha's father
- Carolina Ferraz as Alexia Bragança Queirós, one of Cadinho's wives
- Eliane Giardini as Muricy Araújo, mother of Tufão and Ivana, and Adauto's girlfriend
- Camila Morgado as Noêmia Buarque Queirós, Tomás' mother and one of Cadinho's wives
- Betty Faria as Pilar Albuquerque, Alexia's mother
- Marcos Caruso as Leleco (Laércio Araújo), father of Tufão and Ivana, Muricy's ex husband, and Tessália's boyfriend
- Ailton Graça as Paulo Silas, Darkson's father
- Tony Ramos as Genésio Fonseca Souza, Rita and Agatha's biological father

=== Recurring and guest ===
- Cláudia Assunção as Neide
- João Henrique Gago as Valdo, Betânia's boyfriend
- André Luiz Miranda as Valentim
- Murilo Elbas as Branco
- Ana Karolina Lannes as Ágatha Moreira Araújo, Tufão's adopted daughter, biological daughter of Carminha and Genésio, and Rita's half sister.
- Bruna Griphao as Paloma Bragança, daughter of Alexia and Cadinho
- João Fernandes as Picolé
- Mário Hermetto as Zenon, a police officer
- Márcio Tadeu as Priest Solano
- Leandro Santanna as Herculano, chauffeur and doorman of Tufão's family
- Vilma Melo as Conceição, Verônica's maid
- Bernardo Simões as a young Batata / Jorginho
- Rodrigo Rangel as Moreira
- Breno de Filippo as Tubarão
- Vicentini Gomez as Serjão

== Production ==
=== Casting Selection ===
Originally, the writer wanted Giovanna Antonelli to play the antagonist Carminha, repeating their successful partnership from Da Cor do Pecado. However, the actress declined the offer because she was already committed to the telenovela Salve Jorge, written by Glória Perez, and could not take on another project at the same time. After Antonelli’s refusal, the role was offered to Alessandra Negrini, but the network’s management vetoed her casting due to personal issues involving actor Murilo Benício, who would be playing her romantic partner in the story. Eliane Giardini and Fabíula Nascimento were considered as possibilities for two different phases of the character, but the idea was discarded. Following that, Malu Mader and Adriana Esteves were considered, and ultimately, Esteves was cast in the role.

To play the sensual character Suélen, director Amora Mautner personally invited Marjorie Estiano, but she declined as she had already been cast as one of the leads in Lado a Lado —a telenovela from the 6 PM timeslot, which later went on to win Best Telenovela at the 2013 International Emmy Awards, beating Avenida Brasil. As a result, Isis Valverde was confirmed for the role.

Regina Duarte and Fernanda Montenegro were invited to play Lucinda. However, Duarte didn’t like the character’s profile, and Montenegro was busy filming the movie A Dama do Estácio, so the role was passed on to Vera Holtz.

Juliana Paes declined the role of Noêmia in order to star in the remake of Gabriela (2012), which was a high-profile lead role. The part then went to Camila Morgado.

Mariana Ximenes was initially considered for one of the leads in Cheias de Charme but declined it to play Débora in Avenida Brasil. However, the network later reassigned her to Guerra dos Sexos, stating that the role of Débora required a younger actress. After several “6 PM telenovela” lead roles, Nathalia Dill was cast as Débora. Nathalia was reportedly disappointed with the direction her character took—initially introduced as the second antagonist (after Carminha), meant to interfere in the relationship between Nina and Jorginho, but she ended up becoming a supporting character with no independent storyline.

=== Opening sequence ===
The opening was created by director Alexandre Pit Ribeiro, which featured 135 dancers dancing on a catwalk. The choreography was produced by Dudu Neles.

The opening theme is a re-recording of Vem Dançar Kuduro with new Portuguese lyrics, adapted to the Brazilian market. It was played by Robson Moura and Lino Krizz, and known for its refrain "Oi Oi Oi", which became successful in social networks.

== Impact ==
=== Ratings ===
==== National reception ====
The soap opera had a successful run, increasingly becoming a critical and commercial success. It became a popular subject on social media. On the night of its final chapter, it topped Twitter's trending topics worldwide. The last chapter notoriously ceased major activities in Brazil, when the streets of big cities as São Paulo and Rio de Janeiro were deserted. Rede Globo's programming had segments dedicated to the soap opera and several other Brazilian television networks also commented on its end. With the high number of television sets tuned in, a hoax quickly spread about a possible nationwide blackout after the broadcast, due to an effect called "loading ramp", where people resume activities which could generate an electricity overload, leaving the country in the dark. However, this did not actually occur. The last chapter was watched by 80 million people, making it the highest rated Brazilian television program in 2012.

Timeslot	# Ep.	Premiere		Finale		Rank	Season	Rating average
Timeslot	# Ep.	Date	Premiere Rating	Date	Finale Rating	Rank	Season	Rating average
Mondays—Saturdays; 9:15pm	179	26 March 2012	37	19 October 2012	51	#1	2012–13	39

==== Portugal ====
Besides the success in Brazil, Avenida Brasil, is also a big hit with the audience in Portugal. In its debut, 24 September 2012, the novel has recorded 13 points and 31.6% audience share, finishing third in the ranking of hearings that day. Week after week, the soap opera continued to record satisfactory levels of audience. On 15 November 2012 Avenida Brasil recorded 11.4 points and an audience share of 36%, meaning that one in three televisions were watching a telenovela. It was the fourth most watched program each day. On 3 January 2013 it was registering 15.9 points and an audience share of 36.6%, the largest audience to date. It remained fourth place in the rankings.

Timeslot	# Ep.	Premiere		Final		Rank	Season	Views average
Timeslot	# Ep.	Date	Premiere share	Date	Finale share	Rank	Season	Views average
Mondays—Friday; 11:30pm	200	24 September 2012	36.3%	6 September 2013	39%	No. 1	2013	1.5 million

=== Awards and nominations ===
The cast received 108 nominations and won 36 awards. João Emanuel Carneiro, Adriana Esteves, Murilo Benício and Mel Maia were the most prized.

== Broadcast ==
English title-card.

Avenida Brasil became the most exported telenovela made by Rede Globo, surpassing Da Cor do Pecado (ibid), which was the prior sales leader for other countries.

The telenovela has been licensed by more than 150 countries, including all of Latin America, the United States, South Korea, Armenia and Sweden, being dubbed into 19 languages.

== Reception ==
In Portugal it received 16.1 points and a 39% audience share for the last chapter, which means more than 1.5 million viewers watched the outcome of the novela. The plot debuted in SIC in September 2012 and was leader of the time in which it was displayed. It was one of the most watched programs in the country, second only to "Dancin' Days", co-produced by Globo and SIC. The telenovela has also good viewing figures in Greece, Croatia, Hungary and Kosovo. Argentina reached an average of 12 points with peaks of 13.3 in its first chapter, ensuring impressive viewing figures for Telefe.

== Soundtrack ==
=== Nacional ===
Avenida Brasil - Nacional

Soundtrack album by Various artists
- Released: 2012
- Label: Som Livre

Cover
Murilo Benício

No.	Title	Music	Significance	Length
1.	"Reza"	Rita Lee	Cadinho
2.	"Amiga da Minha Mulher"	Seu Jorge	Silas and Olenka
3.	"Humilde Residência"	Michel Teló	Adauto
4.	"Assim Você Mata o Papai"	Sorriso Maroto	Tessália
5.	"Depois"	Marisa Monte	Jorginho and Nina
6.	"Cachorro Perigoso"	Tchê Garotos	Darkson
7.	"Correndo Atrás de Mim"	Aviões do Forró	Suellen
8.	"Meu Lugar"	Arlindo Cruz
9.	"Filho da Simplicidade"	Grupo Revelação
10.	"História de Nós Dois"	José Augusto	Tufão and Monalisa
11.	"Pura Adrenalina"	Belo	Silas and Monalisa
12.	"A Menina do Salão de Beleza"	Pedro Luís e a Parede
13.	"O Dia do Corno"	Reginaldo Rossi	Tufão
14.	"Tá Faltando Homem"	Banda Xeiro De Mel	Olenka
15.	"Vem Dançar com Tudo"	Robson Moura feat. Lino Krizz	Theme song
16.	"Cupido"	Maria Rita	Jorginho and Débora

=== Nacional Vol. 2 ===
Avenida Brasil - Nacional Vol. 2

Soundtrack album by Various artists
- Released: 2012
- Label: Som Livre

Cover
Débora Falabella

No.	Title	Music	Significance	Length
1.	"Você de Mim Não Sai"	Luan Santana	Suelen, Roni and Leandro
2.	"Eu Quero Tchu, Eu Quero Tcha Mulher"	João Lucas & Marcelo	Silas and Olenka
3.	"Hot Dog"	Buchecha	Darkson
4.	"Favorita (Remix)"	MC Marcinho
5.	"Em um Outdoor"	Zeca Pagodinho
6.	"Mas que Nada"	Sérgio Mendes	Darkson
7.	"Minha Razão"	Péricles and Chitãozinho & Xororó	Tufão and Nina
8.	"Pra Me Provocar"	MC Koringa	Suelen
9.	"Ricardão"	Mariozan	Leleco and Muricy
10.	"Nem Vem que Não Tem"	Wilson Simonal	Nilo
11.	"Charme"	Bebeto	Silas and Monalisa
12.	"Que Bonito É (Instrumental)"	Waldir Calmon
13.	"Mulher Carioca"	Preta Gil
14.	"Tanta Coisa"	Paolo	Darkson and Tessália

=== Internacional ===
Avenida Brasil - Internacional

Soundtrack album by Various artists
- Released: 2012
- Label: Som Livre

Cover
Cauã Reymond

No.	Title	Music	Significance	Length
1.	"Long Live"	Taylor Swift	Débora	5:16
2.	"Set Fire to the Rain"	Adele	Nina	4:00
3.	"Finally Falling"	Mayer Hawthorne		3:21
4.	"Charlie Brown"	Coldplay	Débora and Jorginho	4:45
5.	"Video Games"	Lana Del Rey	Débora	4:42
6.	"The One That Got Away"	Katy Perry		3:48
7.	"Hotel Nacional"	Gloria Estefan	Cadinho	3:26
8.	"Addicted to You"	Shakira	Suelen	2:27
9.	"Bring On the Nite"	Mister Jam feat. Ali Pierre & Cymcolé	Max	3:39
10.	"Infiltrado"	Bajofondo	Carminha	3:40
11.	"The Glory of Love"	Paul McCartney	Max and Carminha	3:43
12.	"Endless Love"	Lionel Richie & Shania Twain	Ronni and Suellen	4:17
13.	"Belle"	Cattle and Cane	Ronni, Suellen and Leandro	4:14
14.	"She's Got Everything"	Ellison Chase	Agata

== Remakes ==
=== Turkey ===
In October 2023, Ay Yapım announced it acquired the rights to produce Turkish remake of the telenovela. The series, titled Leyla: Hayat... Aşk... Adalet... premiered on 11 September 2024 and stars Cemre Baysel, Gonca Vuslateri and Yiğit Kirazcı.

=== Portugal ===
In September 2026, it was announced that SIC would produce a Portuguese remake, titled Avenida Portugal.

== Sequel ==
On 6 November 2025, the Léo Dias website reported that TV Globo was developing a sequel to Avenida Brasil to premiere in 2027, as a way to celebrate the 15th anniversary of the telenovela. It would be the replacement for Quem Ama Cuida in the 9pm timeslot and would have Ricardo Villamarim as director and João Emmanuel Carneiro as writer. The sequel was greenlit in January 2026.
