= Bróder =

2010 film directed by Jeferson De

- Directed by: Jefferson De
- Written by: Jeferson De; Newton Cannito
- Produced by: Paulo Boccato; Mayra Lucas; Renata Moura
- Starring: Caio Blat; Jonathan Haagensen; Sílvio Guindane; Cássia Kiss; Ailton Graça
- Release date: 2010 (Berlin)
- Country: Brazil
- Language: Portuguese

Bróder is a 2010 Brazilian drama film directed by Jefferson De. It was screened in the Panorama section of the 60th Berlin International Film Festival and won Best Picture at the Gramado Film Festival.
