= Alexandre Borges =

Brazilian actor (born 1966)

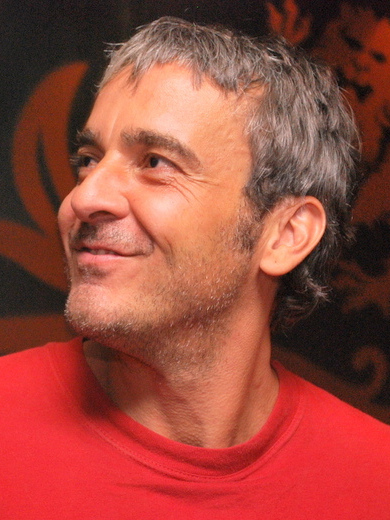
- Borges in 2011
- Born: 23 February 1966 (age 60); Santos, São Paulo, Brazil
- Occupation: Actor
- Spouse: Júlia Lemmertz (m. 1993; div. 2015)
- Children: 1

Alexandre Borges Corrêa (born 23 February 1966) is a Brazilian actor. He is known for his work in Brazilian telenovelas.

== Personal life ==
While filming Guerra Sem Fim (1993), Borges began a relationship with actress Júlia Lemmertz. He was married to her in 1993 and they have a son, Miguel (born 2000). They divorced in 2015.

== Television ==
- 1993 – Guerra sem Fim.... Cacau
- 1994 – Incidente em Antares\.... Padre Pedro Paulo
- 1995 – Engraçadinha... Seus Amores e Seus Pecados.... Luís Cláudio
- 1995 – A Próxima Vítima.... Bruno Biondi
- 1996 – Quem É Você?.... Afonso
- 1997 – Joana e Marcelo, Amor à Primeira Vista.... Marcelo
- 1997 – Zazá.... Solano Dumont
- 1998 – Torre de Babel.... Ronaldo Mendes
- 1998 – Pecado Capital.... Nélio Porto Rico
- 1999 – Joana e Marcelo, Amor que Fica.... Marcelo
- 1999 – Mulher.... João Pedro
- 2000 – A Muralha.... Dom Guilherme Shetz
- 2000 – Laços de Família.... Danilo Albuquerque
- 2001 – As Filhas da Mãe.... Leonardo Brandão
- 2002 – Joana e Marcelo, Amor (Quase) Perfeito.... Marcelo
- 2002 – O Beijo do Vampiro.... Rodrigo
- 2003 – Celebridade.... Cristiano Reis
- 2004 – O Pequeno Alquimista.... Aderbal
- 2004 – A Diarista.... Calígua
- 2005 – Belíssima.... Alberto Sabatini
- 2007 – Amazônia, de Galvez a Chico Mendes.... Plácido de Castro
- 2007 – Desejo Proibido.... Dr. Escobar
- 2008 – Três Irmãs.... Artur Áquila
- 2009 – India - A Love Story.... Raul Cadore / Humberto Cunha
- 2010 – Ti Ti Ti.... Jacques Leclair / André Spina
- 2012 – Avenida Brasil.... Cadinho (Carlos Eduardo de Souza Queirós)
- 2013 – Além do Horizonte... Thomas
- 2015 – I Love Paraisópolis... Juju (Jurandir)
- 2016 – Haja Coração... Aparício Varella (Cicinho)
- 2018 – Deus Salve o Rei... Rei Otávio de Cáseres
- 2019 – Verão 90... Joaquim Ferreira Lima (Quinzão)
- 2023 – Elas por Elas... Pedro
- 2026 – Quem Ama Cuida... Ulisses Brandão

=== Special series ===
- 1995 – A Comédia da Vida Privada, Sexo na Cabeça .... Antônio
- 1995 – Você Decide, O Príncipe Desencantado
- 1995 – Você Decide, A Dama de Ferro
- 1996 – Não Fuja da Raia
- 1996 – Mundo VIP .... Ele Mesmo
- 1998 – Você Decide, Trabalho Escravo
- 1998 – Mundo VIP .... Ele Mesmo
- 1999 – Mundo VIP .... Ele Mesmo
- 2000 – Mundo VIP .... Ele Mesmo
- 2001 – Sai de Baixo, Miami ou Me Deixe .... Dênis
- 2001 – Mundo VIP .... Ele Mesmo
- 2002 – A Grande Família, A Escolha de Bebel
- 2002 – Os Normais, Uma Amizade Normal .... Marcelo
- 2004 – A Diarista, Aquele da Regressão .... Calígula
- 2005 – Sob Nova Direção, O Passado Mora ao Lado .... Guilherme
- 2006 – Casseta & Planeta, Urgente!
- 2008 – Casos e Acasos, O Bombeiro, o Furto e a Foto .... Vinícius
- 2008 – Essa História Dava um Filme .... Ele Mesmo
- 2009 – Episódio Especial .... Ele Mesmo
- 2009 – Chico e Amigos .... Augusto
- 2009 – Programa Piloto .... Alvarenga
- 2010 – Episódio Especial ....

== Cinema ==
- 1991 – Paixão Cigana
- 1992 – Sangue, Melodia
- 1993 – Estado de Espírito
- 1994 – Mil e Uma.... Antônio
- 1996 – Tudo Cheira a Gasolina ....
- 1996 – Terra Estrangeira.... Miguel
- 1997 – Mangueira - Amor à Primeira Vista.... Marcelo
- 1997 – Glaura
- 1998 – Traição.... Marido
- 1998 – Amor & Cia..... Machado
- 1999 – Amor que Fica.... Marcelo
- 1999 – Um Copo de Cólera
- 1999 – Até que a Vida nos Separe.... João
- 2000 – Deus Jr.
- 2000 – Bossa Nova.... Acácio
- 2001 – Nelson Gonçalves.... Nelson Gonçalves
- 2001 – Garota do Rio
- 2001 – O Invasor.... Gilberto / Giba
- 2002 – Joana e Marcelo, Amor (Quase) Perfeito.... Marcelo
- 2002 – As Três Marias
- 2003 – Acquária.... Bártok
- 2004 – Pato com Laranja
- 2005 – Nanoilusão
- 2006 – Balada das Duas Mocinhas de Botafogo.... Father
- 2006 – Zuzu Angel.... Fraga
- 2006 – Gatão de Meia Idade.... Cláudio
- 2008 – Adagio Sostenuto.... José Morelli
- 2008 – Plastic City....
- 2011 – Retrato Falhado.... Delegado Araújo
- 2014 – Mr. Peabody and Sherman.... Mr. Peabody (voice)
- 2014 – Getúlio.... Carlos Lacerda
- 2015 – Happily Married (Bem Casados).... Heitor
