= Paula Burlamaqui =

Brazilian actress

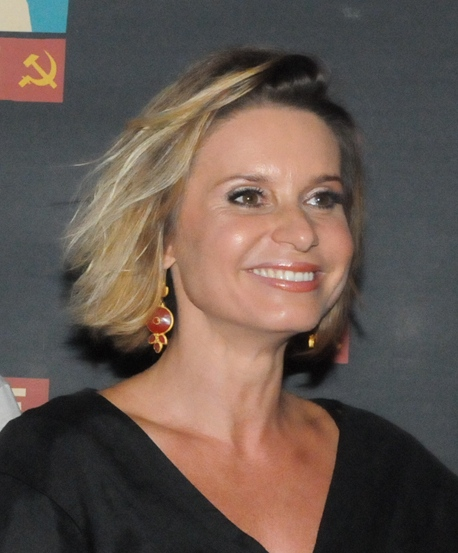
- Born: February 2, 1967 (age 59); Niterói, Rio de Janeiro, Brazil
- Other name: Paula Burlamaquy
- Occupation: Actress
- Years active: 1987–present

Paula Burlamaqui is a Brazilian actress who has starred in many Rede Globo productions.

== Selected filmography ==
- Barriga de Aluguel (1990)
- Pedra sobre Pedra (1992)
- O Mapa da Mina (1993)
- Explode Coração (1995)
- O Circo das Qualidades Humanas (2000)
- Uga-Uga (2000)
- Sabor da Paixão (2002)
- América (2005)
- O Profeta (2006)
- Faça Sua História (2008)
- A Favorita (2008)
- Cama de Gato (2009)
- Cordel Encantado (2011)
- Avenida Brasil (2012)
- Joia Rara (2013)
- A Regra do Jogo (2015)
- Órfãos da Terra (2019)
- Elas por Elas (2023)
- Êta Mundo Melhor! (2025)
