= Haja Coração =

- Genre: Telenovela; Romantic comedy
- Created by: Daniel Ortiz
- Based on: Sassaricando by Silvio de Abreu
- Written by: Daniel Ortiz; Flávia Bessone; Isabel Muniz; Patrícia Moretzsohn; Nilton Braga
- Directed by: Teresa Lampreia; Fred Mayrink
- Creative director: Fred Mayrink
- Starring: Mariana Ximenes; Malvino Salvador; João Baldasserini; Tatá Werneck; Alexandre Borges; Jayme Matarazzo; Fernanda Vasconcellos; Cléo Pires; Marisa Orth; Ellen Rocche; Agatha Moreira; José Loreto; Chandelly Braz; Gabriel Godoy; Carolina Ferraz; Malu Mader
- Opening theme: "O Farol" by Ivete Sangalo
- Country of origin: Brazil
- Original language: Portuguese
- No. of episodes: 138 (100 International version)

Production
- Editors: Rosemeire Barros Oliveira; Alberto Gouvea; George Hamilton; Edson Melo; Fabio Villela
- Camera setup: Multi-camera
- Running time: 40-42 minutes
- Production company: Estúdios Globo

Original release
- Network: TV Globo
- Release: 31 May – 8 November 2016

Haja Coração (English title: Burning Hearts) is a Brazilian telenovela produced and broadcast by TV Globo. It is based on the 1987 classic Sassaricando created by Silvio de Abreu. It premiered on 31 May 2016, replacing Totalmente Demais at the 7 p.m. timeslot. Written by Daniel Ortiz in collaboration with; Patrícia Moretzsohn, Flávia Bessone, Isabel Muniz and Nilton Braga.

Features performances by Mariana Ximenes, Malvino Salvador, Alexandre Borges, Tatá Werneck, Jayme Matarazzo, Fernanda Vasconcellos, Cléo Pires, Marisa Orth, João Baldasserini, Agatha Moreira, José Loreto, Chandelly Braz and Gabriel Godoy.

== Production ==
Despite having several characters and themes from Sassaricando, the author Daniel Ortiz, considers Haja Coração not a remake, having only inspired by Silvio de Abreu's telenovela, he maintained some cores and situations and while eliminating others. Basically, it is a reboot. The author also maintained the city of São Paulo as a backdrop to the telenovela, but prefers to show as a more solar and cheerful version, without violence.

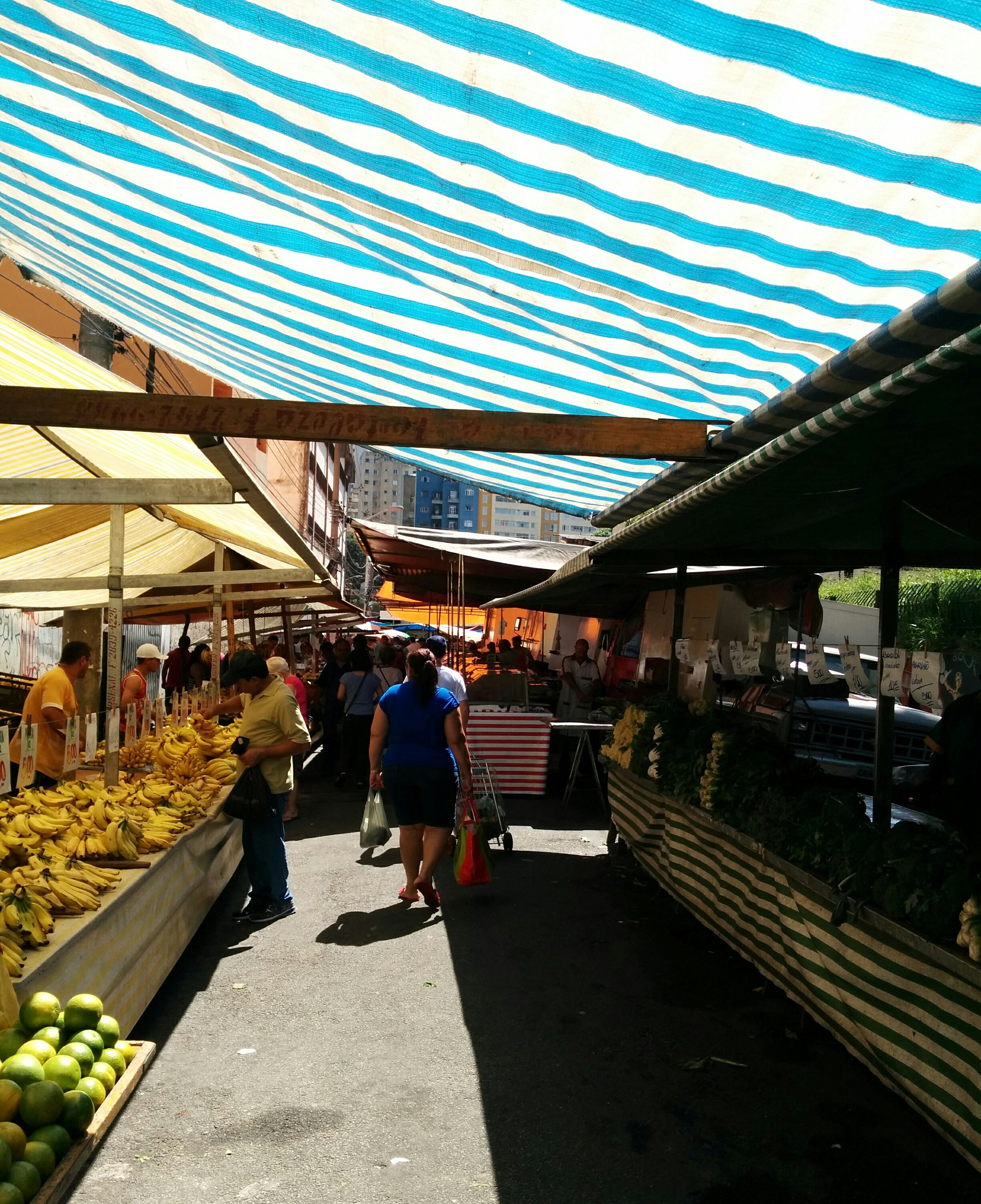
One of the markets in São Paulo that serves as filming site

Scenes were recorded at Vale do Anhangabaú, Vila Madalena, Avenida Paulista and in Bom Retiro. In a unique action, the last episode of Totalmente Demais had "crossover" with Haja Coração: the character Fedora, portrayed by Tatá Werneck, featured in the publishing of the magazine Totalmente Demais on the cover of the publication.

The production also has a spin-off: the animated series, Tito Cachorrinho e sua Turma, inspired by the puppy Tito. The puppy of Jack Russell Terrier will be a character of the telenovela. The series will be launched in a partnership between Gshow and Som Livre. Clips with music and choreography, in addition to a line of products licensed and the launch is planned after the launch of the novella, on the YouTube channel of Som Livre, in Gshow and Globoplay.

=== Casting and character development ===
The choices of an actress to portray Tancinha were rather a challenge. Monica Iozzi was the first to be invited to the character but she declined the invitation. Leandra Leal and Paolla Oliveira were also options for the character due to their experiences. Oliveira was later announced as interpreter of character, but due to her portrayal at Além do Tempo, in which she was one of the protagonists, the network decided to live her out, for her to take a break from the small screen. A third option, Isis Valverde, was then considered but she had commitments. Thus, Mariana Ximenes was offered the role. Dani Calabresa auditioned to portray Fedora, but the direction of Zorra Total vetoed the participation of same. Tatá Werneck was announced as interpreter of the role. Regina Casé was announced to play Theodore same as Maria Clara Gueiros, both could not participate for being involved with other projects. Grace Gianoukas got the role instead. Christiane Torloni was originally cast as Francesca but chose to join the cast of Velho Chico, Marisa Orth later replaced her. Unlike other characters, the one played by Fernanda Vasconcellos, the writers changed the name of the character Brigite to Bruna. Chay Suede was to interpret Giovanni but preferred to dedicate himself to the feature film, Minha Fama de Mau, leaving Jayme Matarazzo for the character. Initially, Mauricio Destri also auditioned for the character Beto but João Baldasserini was preferred over him.

== Plot ==
Set in Mooca, a simple neighborhood of São Paulo, the plot follows the life of Tancinha (Mariana Ximenes), a simple and clumsy girl who, having been raised in the traditional Italian family, holds a strong accent. For fifteen years she has lived a romance spiced up with the mechanic Apolo (Malvino Salvador), full of fights and reconciliations since both have strong personalities. Their love is shaken when she meets Beto (João Baldasserini), an advertiser willing to win her over with his charm and he shows a world of options outside her routine life. Tancinha is the eldest daughter of Francesca Di Marino (Marisa Orth), a marketer who alone, raised her four children: the gentle Giovanni (Jayme Matarazzo), the envious Carmela (Chandelly Braz) and the long-suffering Shirlei (Sabrina Petraglia), as well as Tancinha. Francesca never accepted the mysterious disappearance of her husband, Guido (Werner Schünemann), and suspected that the businessman Aparício (Alexandre Borges) was linked to the event after finding some clues, with the help of Tancinha.

When younger, Aparício was poor who left his true love, Rebeca (Malu Mader), and opted to be a gold digger and marrying a millionaire Teodora Abdala (Grace Gianoukas), a bossy Harridan who inherited a conglomeration of companies. He assumed the Presidency of the company next to her wife woman, although it is she who give the orders, and both gave had a daughter Fedora (Tatá Werneck), an it girl, extravagant, spoiled girl who became the image of the mother. She marries the mysterious Leonardo (Gabriel Godoy), who initially was planning a coup to keep all the money, but ends up falling for her. However, while attempting to abort the plan to kill Fedora in a helicopter explosion, he ends up accidentally killing Teodora and now has to cover up the lies to keep his wife.

Rebecca, on the other hand, lived in Europe for a long time and became a brilliant architect, but returned to Brazil without any money after discovering that her late husband spent all they had before he died. She joins the two friends who are also bankrupt – Penelope (Carolina Ferraz), a former housewife who got divorced without taking anything, and Leonora (Ellen Rocche), a former member of Big Brother Brazil – for hunting a millionaire husband and save the three. She finds a job in the company of Abdalas and rejoins with Aparício, pretending to be a simple janitor. Already Camila (Agatha Moreira), the arrogant niece Teodora, was responsible for the wrongful arrest of Giovanni, who after being released and vows to take revenge on her. However, when she loses her memory, she falls in love with Giovanni who reciprocates despite the bitterness. Moreover, Bruna (Fernanda Vasconcellos), Giovanni's girlfriend, is a thorn on his side as she intends to do everything to separate them.

== Cast ==
Actor/Actress	Character
Mariana Ximenes	Constância Rigoni Di Marino (Tancinha)
Malvino Salvador	Apolo dos Santos Gutierrez Menezes
João Baldasserini	Roberto Bacellar (Beto)
Tatá Werneck	Fedora Abdalla Varella Raposo de Almaci (Fefê)
Alexandre Borges	Aparício Varella
Jayme Matarazzo	Giovani Rigoni Di Marino
Fernanda Vasconcellos	Bruna Ferraz
Cléo Pires	Tamara Bacellar
Marisa Orth	Francesca Rigoni Di Marino
Grace Gianoukas	Teodora Abdalla Varella
Agatha Moreira	Camila Abdalla Varella
José Loreto	Adônis dos Santos Gutierrez Menezes
Chandelly Braz	Carmela Rigoni Di Marino
Gabriel Godoy	Leonardo Raposo Almaci (Leozinho)
Malu Mader	Rebeca Rocha De la Fuente
Carolina Ferraz	Penélope Bacellar Vélazquez
Ellen Rocche	Leonora Lammar
Cláudia Jimenez	Lucrécia Abdalla Varella
Marcelo Médici	Agílson Varella
Werner Schünemann	Guido Di Marino
Betty Gofman	Vitória Miranda
Nando Rodrigues	Henrique Braga
Sabrina Petraglia	Shirley Rigoni Di Marino
Ana Carbatti	Nair Gutierrez
Johnnas Oliva	Enéas Carvalho
Conrado Caputto	Renan Camargo Aguiar
Duda Mamberti	Ariovaldo Constantino Prado
Renata Augusto	Dinalva
Isabel Wilker	Adriana Cavalcantti
Marcos Pitombo	Felipe Miranda
Marcella Valente	Larissa Gutierrez Aguiar
Karen Junqueira	Jéssica Sampaio Miranda
Igor Pushinov	Dinamite
Isadora Cruz	Cris Miranda
Julia Faria	Estela Salgado (Estelinha)
Tammy Di Calafiori	Nicole
Nina Frosi	Marina
Cadu Libonati	Murilo
Sabrina de Souza	Rose
Paulo Tiefenthaler	Rodrigo Furtado
Adriana Prado	Isabel
Eunice Bráulio	Gracita
Hilda Rebello	Fabíola
Bruna Griphao	Carolina Talarico
Yasmin Pereira	Tancinha (child)
Luiz Felipe Mello	Apolo (child)
Edu Pinheiro	Adônis (child)
Melissa Maia	Constância (child)
Adriano Fanti	Gerente Hotel
Beatriz Lyra	Dionice

== Soundtrack ==
=== Volume 1 ===
Cover
Mariana Ximenes and Malvino Salvador

Haja Coração - Vol. 1

Soundtrack album by Various artists
- Released: 27 May 2016
- Label: Som Livre

The first volume of Haja Coração's soundtracks was released on 27 May 2016 by Som Livre label. It comprised mainly songs from different artists with different genres.

No.	Title	Music	Significance	Length
1.	"O Farol"	Ivete Sangalo	Themesong	03:26
2.	"Bang"	Anitta	Fedora	03:12
3.	"Química"	Biel	Rebeca, Leonora and Penélope	02:46
4.	"Veneno"	Fernando & Sorocaba	Fedora	02:46
5.	"Fata Morgana"	Dissidenten & Lem Chaheb	Fedora and Leozinho	06:46
6.	"Tiro ao Álvaro"	Péricles	Tancinha and Apolo	02:49
7.	"10 Minutos Longe de Você"	Victor & Leo		03:49
8.	"Na Hora da Raiva"	Henrique & Juliano		02:54
9.	"7 Years"	Lukas Graham		03:59
10.	"Dois Grudados"	Carlinhos Brown		04:30
11.	"Tudo Menos Esse Adeus"	Joanna		04:01
12.	"Lato Destro del Cuore"	Laura Pausini	Francesca	03:52
13.	"Reaper"	Sia	Camila	03:39
14.	"Outra Vez"	Scarcéus		03:36

=== Volume 2 ===
Haja Coração - Vol. 2

Soundtrack album by Various artists
- Released: 30 September 2016
- Label: Som Livre

No.	Title	Artist(s)	Length
1.	"Nesse Vai e Vem"	Turma do Pagode
2.	"A Gente é Tudo Isso"	Thiaguinho
3.	"Fuego"	Gabrielle Musicaro
4.	"Hymn For The Weekend"	Coldplay
5.	"Sem Pressa"	Luiza Possi
6.	"Shiver Down My Spine"	Claudia Leitte
7.	"Não é um Bolero"	Djavan
8.	"Desejos e Delírios"	Fábio Jr.
9.	"The Light That Never Fails"	Andra Day
10.	"Easy"	Faith No More
11.	"Dónde está el Amor"	Pablo Alborán
12.	"Garotas Não Merecem Chorar"	Luan Santana
13.	"Amei Te Ver"	Tiago Iorc
14.	"(They Long to Be) Close to You"	Isabella Taviani
15.	"Si Queres Saber (Se Queres Saber)"	Ângela Maria

== Reception ==
=== Ratings ===
Timeslot (ATZ)	Episodes	Premiere		Finale		Rank	Season	Average viewership
Timeslot (ATZ)	Episodes	Date	Viewers (in points)	Date	Viewers (in points)	Rank	Season	Average viewership
Mondays—Saturdays; 7:15pm	138	31 May 2016	27	8 November 2016	31	TBA	2015–16	28

On its premiere, Haja Coração registered a viewership rating of 27 points in Greater São Paulo, thus, being the most watched show at its timeslot, taking into account, the parallel premiere of Escrava Mãe on Rede Record. Hence better audience compared to its predecessor, Totalmente Demais. The second episode registered 26.4 points according to the consolidated data by IBOPE.

The show recorded significantly higher ratings, for instance, on 11 August, it recorded a viewership ratings of 31.6 points in São Paulo and 33 points in Rio de Janeiro (with 47% audience share).

Its final episode registered 31.1 points.

Preceded by Totalmente Demais; 9 November 2015–30 May 2016	Globo 7 p.m. timeslot telenovela 31 May 2016–8 November 2016	Succeeded by Rock Story; 9 November 2016–5 June 2017
