= José Loreto =

Brazilian actor (born 1984)

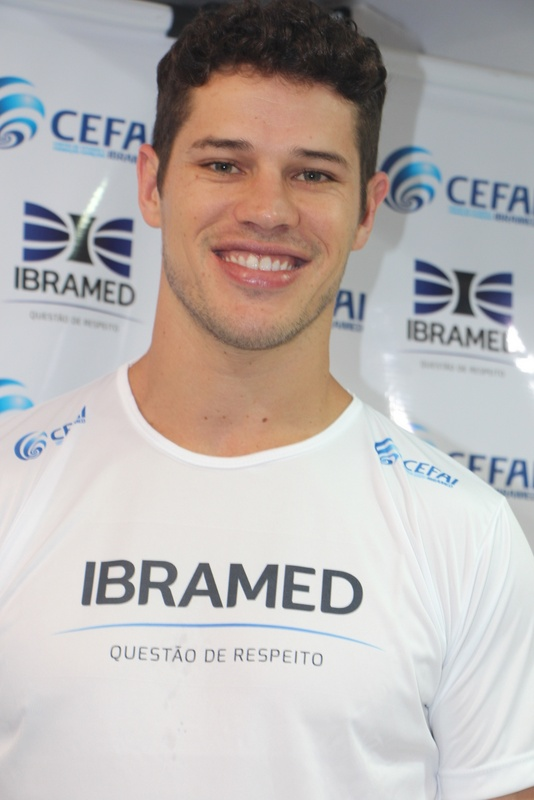
- Loreto in 2016
- Born: 27 May 1984 (age 42); Niterói, Rio de Janeiro, Brazil
- Occupation: Actor
- Years active: 2005–present
- Known for: Avenida Brasil
- Spouse: Débora Nascimento (m. 2016; div. 2019)
- Partner: Nanda Marques (2024–present)
- Children: 1

José Loreto Freixo Prestes (Brazilian Portuguese: [ʒoˈzɛ loˈɾetu]; born 27 May 1984) is a Brazilian actor. He gained recognition while playing the character Darkson in the telenovela Avenida Brasil.

== Biography ==
Loreto was born in Niterói, in Rio de Janeiro state. He graduated in cinema from Casa de Artes Laranjeiras. At age 20 he moved to Hollywood, California, where he worked as a security guard for celebrities like Stevie Wonder and Gisele Bündchen.

== Filmography ==
=== Television ===
| Year | Title | Role | Notes |
|---|---|---|---|
| 2005–2007 | Malhação | Marcão/Paulão | Season 12-13 |
| 2007 | A Turma do Didi | John | Episode: "2 August 2007" |
| 2008 | Os Mutantes | Scorpio | |
| 2008 | Três Irmãs | Luís Carlos "Mamute" | Episodes: "6–9 October 2008" |
| 2010 | Força-Tarefa | Recruta | Episode: "Bolsa-Família" |
| 2010 | Separação?! | Róbson | Episode: "Vaca Atolada" |
| 2010 | Tal Filho, Tal Pai | Careca | Year end special |
| 2011 | Macho Man | - | Episode: "Nelson Sofre um Acidente que Muda sua Vida" |
| 2012 | Avenida Brasil | Darkson Silas | |
| 2012–2018 | Amor e Sexo | Jurado | Seasons 6-11 |
| 2013 | Flor do Caribe | Francisco Cândido Trindade Alburquerque "Candinho" | |
| 2014 | Segunda Dama | Kaíke Rocha | |
| 2014 | Boogie Oogie | Pedro de Oliveira | |
| 2015 | Não se Apega Não | Igor Tullon | Episode: "23 de novembro de 2015" |
| 2015 | Tomara que Caia | Hilton | Episode: "Quem Você Deixaria em uma Ilha Deserta?" |
| 2016 | Haja Coração | Adônis dos Santos Gutierrez Menezes | |
| 2017 | Os Dias Eram Assim | Francisco "Chico" | Episodes: "26 May 2017 - 6 June 2017" |
| 2017 | Mister Brau | Filipe César | Episode: "18 July 2017" |
| 2017 | Cidade Proibida | Adalberto Cruz "Bonitão" | |
| 2018 | Espelho da Vida | Himself | Episode: "September 25 2018" |
| 2018 | O Sétimo Guardião | Eurico Rocha Júnior / Júnior | |
| 2019 | Carcereiros | Paraíba | Episode: "Cartas não Mentem" |
| 2022 | Pantanal | Tadeu Aparecido Leôncio | |
| 2023 | Vai na Fé | Lui Lorenzo Campos | |
| 2024 | The Masked Singer Brasil | Juror | Season 4 |
| 2024 | No Rancho Fundo | Marcelo Gouveia | |
| 2026 | Quem Ama Cuida | Yuri | |

=== Film ===
| Year | Title | Role | Notes |
|---|---|---|---|
| 2014 | Tarzan | Tarzan | Brazilian voice |
| 2014 | Os Homens São de Marte... E É Pra Lá que Eu Vou | Marcelinho | |
| 2016 | Mais Forte que o Mundo | José Aldo | |
| 2019 | Pacified | Nelson | |
| 2019 | Casagrande e Seus Demônios | Walter Casagrande | |

== Theater ==
| Year | Title | Role |
|---|---|---|
| 2007 | Jovens Casais, Problemas Atuais | Brioco |
| 2012 | Garotos | |
| 2016 | A Paz Perpétua | John John |
