= Cordel Encantado =

Brazilian telenovela

- Created by: Duca Rachid; Thelma Guedes
- Directed by: Amora Mautner
- Starring: Bianca Bin; Cauã Reymond; Bruno Gagliasso; Nathália Dill; Jayme Matarazzo; Carmo Dalla Vecchia; Débora Bloch; Luiz Fernando Guimarães; Osmar Prado; Zezé Polessa; Marcos Caruso; Luiza Valdetaro; Heloísa Perissé see more
- Opening theme: Minha Princesa Cordel by Gilberto Gil and Roberta Sá
- Country of origin: Brazil
- Original language: Portuguese
- No. of episodes: 143; 110 (International version)

Production
- Running time: 50 minutes
- Production company: Central Globo de Produção

Original release
- Network: TV Globo
- Release: 11 April – 23 September 2011

Cordel Encantado (English: The Enchanted Tale) is a Brazilian telenovela produced and broadcast by TV Globo from 11 April to 23 September 2011. It has been re-aired in Globo's Vale a Pena Ver de Novo from 14 January to 3 May 2019, replacing Belíssima and being replaced by Por Amor.

== Synopsis ==
Miguezim (Matheus Nachtergaele), a preacher in Brogodó, and Augusto (Carmo Dalla Vecchia), monarch of the kingdom of North Seráfia, have the same prophetic dream. Augusto asks for Amadeus' (Zé Celso Martinez) counsel to decipher it, who tells him that the images represent a long journey that will lead the king to the southern hemisphere; on the trip, a precious commodity will be sacrificed, but in return, the kingdom can finally know happiness and justice.

The series' protagonist—Princess Aurora Catherine Avila Seráfia (Bianca Bin), daughter of Augusto and Queen Cristina (Alinne Moraes)—is born during the war between North and South Seráfia, who have been fighting each other for years after a revolution. The agreement to end the fighting is sealed on the deathbed of South Seráfia's monarch, Theobald (Thiago Lacerda). Seeing her badly injured husband after another terrible battle, Queen Helena (Mariana Lima) goes to North Seráfia and curses Augusto's family. Augustuo is moved by Helena's pain, and at Cristina's suggestion, proposes a deal to Theobald: their firstborns Aurora and Felipe (Jayme Matarazoo) are to marry when they become of age to unify and bring peace to the two states. Theobald accepts the agreement and dies soon after. The two children are presented publicly as the future king and queen of Seráfia. Following the dream interpretation made by Amadeus, a long journey is planned. Zenóbio Alfredo (Guilherme Fontes), a North Seráfian botanist, who was in Brazil for research, reports a treasure hidden in tropical lands by the kingdom's founder, Archbishop Seraphim. The botanist suggests that the king finance an expedition to Brogodó, and Augusto, a lover of science and adventure, agrees and is keen to lead the enterprise. He has Cristina and Aurora accompany him.

Ursula (Débora Bloch), Augusto's sister, and Nicolau (Luiz Fernando Guimarães), the bumbling butler court and Ursula's lover, scheme to get rid of Cristina and Aurora during the trip to become queen. Petrus (Felipe Camargo), her husband and Augusto's younger brother, overhears their plot, but is captured by them and held in a dungeon with his identity concealed. Ursula claims her husband has died.

In Brogodó, where North Seráfia is headed, an infamous bandit chieftain, Herculano (Montagner Domingos), takes his wife Benvinda (Claudia Ohana) and son Jesuíno to Colonel Gennaro's (Reginaldo Faria) farmhouse. In return for providing his family shelter, Herculano offers Gennaro protection from his enemies. Before leaving, Herculano promises to seek Jesuíno when he becomes an adult to succeed him as chieftain. Outraged, Benvinda swears to never allow her son to join the bandits and live amid the violence, pain, and suffering.

As Augusto leads the expedition to cut Brogodó, Nicolau discovers that Herculano wants to steal the entourage. He suggests to Ursula that it would be the perfect occasion to get rid of Cristina and Aurora. When the treasure is located, Herculano attacks Seráfian entourage, and Nicolau uses the chaos to steal the cart with the treasure, kidnap the queen and the princess, and accuse the bandits of the crime. On the trail, a wagon wheel breaks and Cristina sees an opportunity to flee, who runs into the farmers Eusébio (Enrique Diaz) and Virtuosa (Cecilia Ana Costa) and begs them to stay with her daughter.

Nicolau recaptures Cristina but realizes that Aurora is not with her. The two fight in the cart that is carrying the treasure, which falls off a cliff. Nicolau survives while Cristina dies.

When the fight between Augusto and the bandits ends, Herculano returns alone to his hiding place and discovers the wreckage of the cart at the bottom of a cliff. He finds Cristina, who, near death, makes her last request: that Herculano tells Augusto the truth about Aurora.

After the battle, King Augustus looks for his wife and daughter but cannot find them, while Zenóbio discovers the treasure's disappearance. Nicolau reappears and makes up a story of bandits running away with Cristina, Aurora, and the treasure in a cart to Augusto, while he tells Ursula that he got rid of them. Convinced that the two are dead, Augusto travels back to his kingdom.

After many searches, Augusto accepts his daughter's death. Aurora is named Açucena by Eusébio and Virtuosa, and works on Gennaro's farm. She is the goddaughter to Angelica (Beth Berardo), who helps raise her. Angelica is Timóteo's (Bruno Gagliasso) mother, and dies in childbirth without knowing her daughter Antonia (Luiza Valdetaro).

Açucena grows up happy, educated in the school of the village, and lives surrounded by friends, including Jesuíno. The two have many similarities and are inseparable companions. Jesuíno also protects her from Timóteo, Gennaro's son. Years pass, and Jesuíno and Açucena's friendship turn into love.

Things get complicated for the couple when Gennaro dies, and Timóteo, who just arrived from Rio de Janeiro, takes the place of the father on the farm. He gets drunk with power and exploits Brogodó. Jesuíno, who runs the farm, tries to help as many employees as he can as working conditions worsen. Jesuíno and Timóteo do not fulfill Gennaro's last wish: to live together in peace despite loving the same woman.

Jesuíno gets enough money to marry Açucena, while Timóteo tries to stop the wedding.

After 20 years, Herculano decides to keep the promise he made to Cristina and tell Augusto that his daughter is alive. He relays the message to Zenóbio, who goes to Seráfia to personally tell the king.

Augusto makes another trip to Brazil, this time accompanied by the Queen Mother Efigênia (Berta Loran). Ursula sends Nicolau back.

When the mayor of Brogodó, Patácio (Mark Caruso), and his wife, Ternurinha (Zeze Polessa), learn that Açucena is Aurora, they invite the press to find out more about her. Jesuíno does not like Açucena's new life, especially with Felipe's appearance. Açucena, however, does not give the boy's courtship and insists on his engagement to Jesuíno.

To meet Timóteo, Jesuíno gathers his friends Galician (Renan Ribeiro), Quiquiqui (Marcello Novaes), and Setembrino (Glicério Rosario) to act against him. They steal food from the farm stock and distribute it to the settlers.

Helena arrives unannounced in Brogodó and tells everyone that Seráfia is suffering from a revolt that killed Amadeus. The European people require compliance with the peace agreement between the royal families of North and South Seráfia. Augusto tells her that Aurora has been found, but does not want to marry Felipe. Ursula suggests they resume the idea of joining Felipe and Carlota, but Augusto does not like the suggestion and assures that, with a little more time, be able to convince her daughter to change his mind.

Jesuíno is determined to marry Açucena, but worries that it will not happen. Açucena asks him why he is distraught, and he lies, saying he fears she will leave him to be a princess. Açucena says he does not care about its origins.

On the day of Açucena and Jesuíno's wedding, Augusto challenges Jesuíno: if Jesuíno wins, he can marry Açucena; otherwise she marries Felipe. Jesuíno accepts the challenge, and Açucena pleads with the both of them to give up when she enters.

Timóteo appears in the confusion and announces to the guests that Cicero (Miguel Romulus), the bride's brother, is dead and that the account responsible for this is the Herculano. He takes the opportunity to reveal to everyone that Jesuíno is Herculano's son. To everyone's relief, Cicero is discovered alive but badly hurt.

Açucena decides to become a princess of Seráfia after she sees Jesuíno and Doralice (Nathalia Dill), Patácio's daughter, kissing. Augusto is overjoyed with his daughter's decision and plans a ball to introduce her to society. She and Jesuíno almost reconcile, but follow different paths. Jesuíno saves Açucena from a kidnapping attempt masterminded by Timóteo, and takes her to his home in Vila da Cruz. She proposes that the two flee to live together, but he reminds her that he is a fugitive, and that she should not give up her life as a princess.

Timóteo joins Ursula to capture the princess. She pins the blame of Aurora's disappearance and Cristina's death on him. As she makes the revelations, Timothy and his henchmen surround the palace. The farmer takes the opportunity to capture Açucena.

Timóteo announces to the city that the cardinal of Seráfia will make him king and bless his engagement to the princess after he forces Augusto and his Petrus to be his slaves.

After confirming Jesuíno's heritage with Efigênia—he is related to Seraphim of Avila, founder of Seráfia—Miguezim and the queen try to tell him the news.

Augusto acknowledges that Jesuíno has a right to the throne as a descendant of Serafim of Avila, and offers him the crown and his blessing to marry Aurora. Jesuíno only wants to stay in Brogodó with Açucena, who supports whatever decision he makes.

Jesuíno is captured by Timóteo. Afraid that Herculano's plans to release Jesuíno would fail, Açucena goes to Timóteo and offers him a deal: she will marry him in exchange for Jesuíno's freedom. Timóteo decides to hang Jesuíno soon after the wedding ceremony. Açucena believes that he is killed, not knowing that he survives the murder attempt.

After seeing Jesuíno's supposed death, Açucena takes a potion that is offered by Ursula. Although she does not trust the duchess' intentions, she prefers drinking poison rather than surrender to Timóteo on their wedding night. Ursula tells her that it is a powerful sleep aid that will make it look like she is dead, and that there is an antidote, while she tells Timóteo that it is a love potion that will make her love him. Açucena ingests the liquid and falls into a deep sleep.

To Timóteo's horror, Açucena does not react to the antidote. Jesuíno steals her away, but cannot reverse the deep sleep in which she fell. Without a pulse, she is presumed dead.

Timóteo is shot in a confrontation with Zoio-Furado (Tuca Andrada) and is left for dead. Meanwhile, Açucena wakes up.

Timóteo reappears in Brogodó, very sick, and swears revenge. He captures Açucena and sets fire to the church he is hiding in. Açucena is saved, and Timóteo dies.

Antonia and Inácio marry, as do Doralice and Felipe. Jesuíno is crowned Serafim II. Jesuíno and Açucena marry and later celebrate the news of Açucena's pregnancy. The couple decides to leave Seráfia and return to Brogodó.

Patácio's candidacy is contested because of irregularities in his administration and Felipe becomes the new mayor of Brogodó.

=== Subplots ===
Zenóbio is a good friend of Augusto. When the king gives up looking for Aurora in Brazil and returns to Seráfia, Zenóbio tells him that he will stay in Brogodó because he is charmed by the flora, fauna, and Florinda (Emanuelle Araujo). The couple gets married and have three daughters: Rose (Isabelle Drummond), Dulcina (Barbara Maia), and Zig (Caio Manhente). They also raise Teínha (Patricia Werneck), Florinda's younger sister.

Florinda discovers Petrus, who is recognized by Zenóbio and freed.

Through so much traveling, extracting teeth and cutting hair, Farid (Mouhamed Harfouch) woos three women. Delivering equal attention to all, he manages to maintain these relationships secret for years. Neusa (Heloise Périssé), the Delegate Batoré's (Osmar Prado) controlling sister, is envied by all the women of Brogodó, who think Farid is the ideal husband. Over the course of the novela, Farid's escapades are discovered by Neusa. After shedding many tears, she decides to become a more exuberant, daring woman. She seduces Baldini (Emilio de Mello). The general is impressed with the change of Neusa's attitude, and she gives him a kiss. But she ends up with Quiquiqui (Marcello Novaes), who manages to give her a most-awaited child.

Doralice returns to Brogodó years after studying outside, and her father orders her to accompany Felipe during his stay in the city. At first, neither Doralice nor Felipe like the idea. As compensation, Doralice convinces her father to let her work at the town hall and to get involved in the issues of the city. She falls in love with Jesuíno and try to be part of the vigilante gang, but is rejected for being a woman. To be accepted in the group, she pretends to be a man and assumes the identity of Fubá. Doralice falls in love with Felipe, whom she marries.

After returning to Brazil, Augusto is enchanted by Maria Cesária (Lucy Ramos), who he sees for the first time in Patácio's kitchen. She falls for him and by the novela's end, she is pregnant with his child.

Inácio (Maurício Destri), Prince of Northern Seráfia, and Antônia (Luiza Valdetaro), Timóteo's sister, are in love and plan to get together, but the couple's marriage is prevented by Batoré, her bridegroom, who does not want to lose his bride. When he discovers that his bride is abducted shortly before the wedding, Inácio chases after her. Batoré accelerates to escape his rival and hits a woman before running off. He later crashes the car and loses consciousness, and Inácio rescues Antônia. The two return to help the girl who was hit, but she dies from her wounds. Inácio decides to leave the nobility and devote his life to the poor of Vila da Cruz. Batoré, in love with Helena, annuls his own marriage to Antônia.

Throughout the novela, Úrsula falls in love with Herculano. After she tries to convince him to steal Seráfia's treasure and escape together, she flees the camp, but is bitten by a snake while hiding in the woods. Herculano finds and takes her back and calls for the town doctor. Úrsula says that the life of a bandit is no life for her, but that they could have a life of luxury if he accepted to steal the treasure. Herculano stands firm by his decision.

A group of silent film actors from Rio de Janeiro moves the city: Silverio Duarte, Tomás Lampedusa (Gillray Coutinho) and Vicentina Celeste (Mayana Neiva) want to film the story of Princess Aurora and need an actress to play her. They decide to organize a competition to find the most talented girl in the city. Vicentina Celeste is the super star of the capital and is dead jealous with the choice of a new artist, but can only do silent films on account of her shrill voice. Farid, with his Lebanese blood, charm and accent, leaves her madly in love in love with him, and she tries to win him over. Tómas has another mission: he is looking for an actor from Brogodó to take to the capital. Belarmino (João Miguel), Herculano's right-hand man, is chosen.

Belarmino takes the first steps to leave behind the life of a bandit, and rises to fame in the capital. He acts with Lilica (Nanda Costa) in his first audition under Tomás' direction. Penelope observes her beloved's talent with the text in hand, but is uncomfortable with Lilica's intention.

== Cast ==
- Bianca Bin as Açucena Bezerra Araújo / Princess Aurora Catarina Ávila of North Seráfia
- Cauã Reymond as Jesuíno Araújo / King Serafim II Ávila of North Seráfia
- Bruno Gagliasso as Colonel Timóteo Cabral
- Débora Bloch as Duchess Úrsula Ávila of Bragança
- Carmo Dalla Vecchia as King Augusto Frederico III Ávila of North Seráfia
- Domingos Montagner as Captain Herculano Araújo
- Nathalia Dill as Doralice Guerra Peixoto
- Jayme Matarazzo as Prince Filipe Henrique Avignon de Toledo, Crown Prince of South Seráfia
- Luiza Valdetaro as Antônia Cabral
- Lucy Ramos as Queen Maria Cesária Ávila of Seráfia
- Luana Martau as Lady Carlota of Bragança
- Marcos Caruso as Patácio Peixoto
- Zezé Polessa as Maria Bem-Aventurada da Ternura Guerra Peixoto (Ternurinha)
- Luiz Fernando Guimarães as Mordomo Nicolau Brüguel
- Nanda Costa as Lilica
- Tuca Andrada as Leopoldo Fulgêncio (Pierced Eye)
- Osmar Prado as Altino Batoré
- Claudia Ohana as Siá Benvinda Araújo
- Matheus Nachtergaele as Blessed Miguézim
- Isabelle Drummond as Rosa Alfredo Bezerra
- Mariana Lima as Queen Helena Avignon de Toledo of South Seráfia
- Berta Loran as Queen Mother Efigênia Ávila of North Seráfia
- Ana Cecília Costa as Virtuosa Bezerra
- Enrique Diaz as Eusébio Bezerra
- Emílio de Mello as General Baldini
- Mouhamed Harfouch as Farid (Tufik / Said)
- Andréia Horta as Dona Bartira
- Paula Burlamaqui as Penélope Bastos
- Heloísa Perissé as Neusa Batoré
- Land Vieira as Tibungo
- Mauricio Destri as Infant Dom Inácio Avignon de Toledo of South Seráfia
- Miguel Rômulo as Cícero Bezerra
- João Miguel as Belarmino "Bel"
- Felipe Camargo as Duke Petrus Ávila of Bragança
- Emanuelle Araújo as Marchioness Florinda Alfredo
- Guilherme Fontes as Marquess Zenóbio Alfredo
- Flávia Rubim as Duchess Filomena Ávila of Bragança
- Marcello Novaes as Quintino (Quiquiqui)
- Patrícia Werneck as Tainá (Teinha)
- Glicério Rosário as Setembrino
- Débora Duarte as Dona Amália
- Tony Tornado as Damião
- Genézio de Barros as Padre Joaquim
- Ilva Niño as Cândida Araújo
- Bárbara Maia as Dulcina Alfredo
- Renato Góes as Fausto Guerra Peixoto
- Brunno Pedro as Conde Elias
- Renan Ribeiro as Gabriel (Galego)
- Aramis Trindade as Raimundo
- Edmilson Barros as Ademar
- Carolina Loback as Severina
- Pedro Farah as Demóstenes
- Alessandro Tcche as Soldado Rufino
- Isabel Mello as Cordata
- Cristiane Amorim as Janaína Menezes
- Wagner Molina as Genaro
- Kenya Costta as Noca
- Marcelo Flores as Cabo Paçoca
- Matheus Costa as Salim
- João Fernandes as Eronildes "Nidinho" Peixoto
- Sofia Terra as Lady Cecília of Bragança
- Caio Manhente as Zigfredo
- Max Lima as Juca
- Nahuana Costa as Sofia
- Bernardo Simões as Omar
- Maurício Machado as Silverio Duarte
- Caco Ciocler as Colonel Pedro Falcão
- Camilla Amado as Zefa
- José Celso Martinez Corrêa as Counselor Amadeus
- Mayana Neiva as Vincentina Celeste
- Reginaldo Faria as Colonel Januário Cabral
- Alinne Moraes as Queen Cristina Ávila of North Seráfia
- Thiago Lacerda as King Teobaldo I Avignon de Toledo of South Seráfia

== Reception ==
| Timeslot | Episodes | Premiere | | Finale | | Rank | Season | Average viewership |
| Timeslot | Episodes | Date | Viewers (in points) | Date | Viewers (in points) | Rank | Season | Average viewership |
|---|---|---|---|---|---|---|---|---|
| Mondays—Saturdays; 6:00pm | 143 | 11 April 2011 | 24 | 23 September 2011 | 30 | #1 | 2011 | 26 |

== Soundtrack ==
1. "Minha Princesa Cordel" - Gilberto Gil & Roberta Sá
2. "Bela Flor" - Maria Gadú
3. "Quando Assim" - Nuria Mallena
4. "Candeeiro Encantado" - Lenine
5. "Maracatu Atômico" - Chico Science & Nação Zumbi
6. "Chão de Giz" - Zé Ramalho
7. "Saga" - Filipe Catto
8. "Circulandô de Fulô" - Caetano Veloso
9. "Tum Tum Tum" - Karina Buhr
10. "Coração" - Monique Kessous
11. "Na Primeira Manhã" - Alceu Valença
12. "Melodia Sentimental" - Djavan
13. "Estrela Miúda" - Maria Bethânia
14. "Carcará" - Otto
15. "Rei José" - Silvério Pessoa
16. "Xamêgo" - Luiz Gonzaga
