= Quem Ama Cuida =

- Genre: Telenovela
- Created by: Walcyr Carrasco; Claudia Souto
- Written by: Bruno Segadilha; Julia Laks; Martha Mendonça; Wendell Bendelack
- Directed by: Amora Mautner
- Starring: Letícia Colin; Chay Suede; Nathalia Dill; Renato Góes; Isabel Teixeira; Agatha Moreira; Flávia Alessandra; Alexandre Borges; Tony Ramos
- Opening theme: "Pra Melhorar" by Marisa Monte ft. Seu Jorge & Flor Jorge
- Country of origin: Brazil
- Original language: Portuguese

Production
- Production company: Estúdios Globo

Original release
- Network: TV Globo
- Release: 18 May 2026 – present

Quem Ama Cuida (English title: To Love Is to Care) is a Brazilian telenovela created by Walcyr Carrasco and Claudia Souto. It premiered on TV Globo on 18 May 2026. The telenovela stars Letícia Colin, Chay Suede, Nathalia Dill, Renato Góes, Isabel Teixeira, Agatha Moreira, Flávia Alessandra, Alexandre Borges and Tony Ramos.

== Plot ==
The hardworking physiotherapist Adriana faces several misfortunes at once. After being fired from the clinic where she works, she watches a flood destroy the house where she lives with her husband Carlos, who ends up dying in the tragedy, alongside her mother Elisa, her grandfather Otoniel, and her brother Mau Mau. Widowed and the breadwinner of her family, Adriana is forced to start over from scratch, supporting those she loves alone. Unsure of how to proceed, Adriana ends up in a shelter, where she crosses paths for the first time with Pedro, an idealistic lawyer sensitive to the inequalities of the world. The encounter is brief but intense, leaving deep marks on both of them. Over time, Adriana gets a job at the mansion of Arthur Brandão, a powerful businessman in the jewelry industry. A widower, marked by the loss of his wife and the disappearance of his only son, Heitor, Arthur is a tough, lonely, and distrustful man, surrounded by a family driven by self-interest.

The relationship between Adriana and Arthur begins with conflict, but evolves into a bond of trust, affection, and friendship. He finds loyalty in her; she sees in him a man fragile inside. Fearing that his ambitious family will inherit his fortune, Arthur makes a radical decision: he proposes a marriage of convenience to Adriana, based on protection, gratitude, and kindness. Torn between pride and the need to rebuild her life, Adriana accepts, even with the disapproval of Arthur's family and also of Otoniel, who distrusts the Brandão family. Meanwhile, Pedro sees his world crumble when he discovers that the woman he never forgot is about to marry his godfather. He finds himself torn between love and a sense of justice, while clashing with his father, Ademir, a criminal lawyer of dubious character.

The plot takes a turn on the wedding night when, after officiating the union, Arthur is mysteriously murdered. Arturo's sister, resentful and envious socialite Pilar, accuses Adriana as the main suspect, fabricating evidence and bringing in false witnesses, including housekeeper Diná, to incriminate her. Accused, she is tried in a court presided over by Ademir and sent to prison, where she serves six years in a closed regime. Upon leaving prison, Adriana only thinks about getting revenge on the people who framed her, including Pilar, who assumed all of Arthur's fortune and businesses, and Pedro, whom she believes was one of those responsible for her conviction, becoming involved with Heitor in the process, while Pedro, even though in love with Adriana, tries to move on with the ambitious Bruna.

== Cast ==
- Letícia Colin as Adriana de Moraes Brandão
- Chay Suede as Pedro Santana
- Nathalia Dill as Francesca
- Renato Góes as Heitor Brandão
- Isabel Teixeira as Pilar Brandão
- Alexandre Borges as Ulisses Brandão
- Flávia Alessandra as Fábia Brandão
- Agatha Moreira as Ingrid Brandão
- Belize Pombal as Silvana Brandão
- Tony Ramos as Otoniel de Moraes
- Isabela Garcia as Elisa de Moraes
- Mariana Ximenes as Eudora "Dora" Martin
- Dan Stulbach as Dr. Ademir Santana
- Tatá Werneck as Brigitte Brandão
- João Vitor Silva as Rafael Brandão
- Rainer Cadete as César
- João Victor Gonçalves as Maurício de Moraes "Mau Mau"
- Dhara Lopes as Camila Brandão
- Gui Ferraz as Tiago Brandão
- Pietro Antonelli as Felipe Brandão
- Mah Duarte as Carolina Brandão
- Guilherme Piva as Edvaldo
- Henrique Barreira as André
- Deborah Evelyn as Carmen "Carmita"
- Fernanda Marques as Bruna
- José Loreto as Yuri
- Jeniffer Nascimento as Nancy
- Pri Helena as Lyris
- Tony Tornado
- Alan Rocha
- Rodrigo Fagundes as Nicolau
- Igor Rickli as Patrick
- Maria Ribeiro as Beatriz "Bia"
- Pedro Alves as Fernando
- Breno Ferreira as Cléber
- Rosi Campos as Diná
- Mariana Sena as Elenice
- Allan Souza Lima as Tom
- Tatiana Tiburcio as Rosa
- Luana Martau as Matilde "Tilde"
- Duda Almeida as Andréa
- Ricardo Teodoro as Joel
- Cláudio Andrade as Marcos "Marcão"
- Yohama Eshima as Elza
- Glicério do Rosário as Enéas
- Cecília Beraba as Gilda
- Bruno de Mello as Luan
- Eloise Yamashita as Suzana "Suzy"
- João Vitor Carvalho
- Henrique Fraga
- Antônio Caramelo as Camilo
- Arlyane Carvalho as Dafne
  - Valentina Cavalheira as child Dafne
- Ana Bispo
- Maya Dias

=== Guest stars ===
- Antônio Fagundes as Arthur Brandão
- Jesuíta Barbosa as Carlos
- Raphael Logam as Delegado
- Arturo Steffen
- Dhério Chagas
- Drake Zolnick
- Gláucio Gomes
- Rômulo Arantes Neto as Pitucho
- Victor Sparapane
- Daniel Rocha as Guilherme

== Production ==
Filming of the telenovela began on 1 February 2026. It is written by Walcyr Carrasco and Claudia Souto, who had previously worked together on Caras & Bocas (2009–10) and Morde & Assopra (2011). Amora Mautner serves as director.

== Ratings ==
Season	Episodes	First aired		Last aired		Avg. viewers (points)
Season	Episodes	Date	Viewers (points)	Date	Viewers (points)	Avg. viewers (points)
1	TBA	18 May 2026	21.7	TBA	TBD	TBD
