= Episódio Especial =

Portuguese television series

Episódio Especial is a Portuguese TV show Saturday afternoons issued by the SIC. It is presented by Sofia Cerveira and Ricardo Pereira. Brought all the news and the latest developments that took place during the week and on about the famous telenovelas. The program was released on February 23, 2008, registering 6.9% average audience share and 29%.
