= Cama de Gato =

Brazilian telenovela

- Also known as: Cat's Cradle
- Genre: Telenovela; Drama; Romance
- Created by: Duca Rachid; Thelma Guedes
- Directed by: Amora Mautner; Ricardo Waddington
- Starring: Marcos Palmeira; Camila Pitanga; Carmo Dalla Vecchia; Paolla Oliveira; Dudu Azevedo; Heloísa Perissé see more
- Opening theme: Pelo avesso by Titãs
- Ending theme: Pelo avesso by Titãs
- Country of origin: Brazil
- Original language: Portuguese
- No. of episodes: 161; 110 (International version)

Production
- Production location: Brazil
- Running time: 50 minutes

Original release
- Network: TV Globo
- Release: 5 October 2009 – 9 April 2010

Cama de Gato (English title: Cat's Cradle) is a Brazilian telenovela produced and broadcast by TV Globo from October 2009 to April 2010.

== Plot ==
Gustavo, once a poor, kindhearted youngster, is now a successful entrepreneur in the perfume business but has turned cruel, arrogant, and miserable. Alcino, his best friend and business partner, helped him achieve his present success. When Alcino finds out that has a fatal disease and has a few months to live, he decides to play a prank on Gustavo to help him rediscover the decent man he once was and the joy of living he once possessed. Gustavo is married to Veronica, a rich, selfish, spoiled, and ambitious woman who has never loved her husband. Alcino's prank takes an unexpected turn when Veronica, the story's antagonist, interferes, manipulates the surprise, and makes Gustavo lose almost everything after being taken for dead and accused of a crime. While trying to pick up the pieces of his life, Gustavo meets Rose, a simple, hard-working woman who raises four kids by herself with great spirit and optimism. Because of her good heart, she starts to help Gustavo to put his life back together. Gradually, Gustavo and Rose develop feeling for each other, leading him to rediscover his humanity through the hands of this newfound love.

== Cast ==
Actor	Character
Marcos Palmeira	Gustavo Almeida Brandão
Camila Pitanga	Rosenilde Pereira (Rose)
Paola Oliveira	Verônica Tardivo Brandão
Carmo Dalla Vecchia	Alcino Rodrigues
Heloísa Périssé	Taís Helena Amâncio Prazeres Tibiriçá
Aílton Graça	José Sebastião dos Santos (Tião)
Marcello Novaes	Benedito Prazeres Tibiriçá (Bené)
Daniel Boaventura	Solonaldo da Santíssima Trindade (Sólon Gutierrez Ortega)
Dudu Azevedo	Roberto Alves Moreira
Ângelo Antônio	Davi Almeida Brandão
Isabela Garcia	Mariana Antunes Sampaio (Mari)
Paulo Goulart	Severo Tardivo
Emanuelle Araújo	Heloísa Miranda
Nívea Stelmann	Kátia Santana Costa
Paula Burlamaqui	Sofia de Britto Brandão
Rosi Campos	Genoveva Amâncio
Letícia Birkheuer	Natasha Werner (Natasha Santana Costa)
Ilva Niño	Ernestina Prazeres Tibiriçá (Tina)
Tony Tornado	Péricles Tibiriçá
Rainer Cadete	Nuno Alves Moreira
Norma Blum	Irmã Andréia
Walter Breda	Delegado Salviano Quintana
Lupe Gigliotti	Áurea
Aramis Trindade	Dr. Emanoel
Tânia Costa	Bruna
Mouhamed Harfouch	Almeida (Almeidinha)
Ana Berttines	Cleusa Meireles
André Luiz Miranda	Juvenal Tardivo
Beta Perez	Lurdes
Bianca Salgueiro	Eurídice de Britto Brandão
Chico Tenreiro	Paquito (Mosquito)
Gustavo Maya	Francisco Pereira dos Santos
Guta Gonçalves	Débora de Lucca Rodrigues
Jorge Cerruti	Domênico (Vitor Bittencourt)
Julyana Garcia	Regina Pereira dos Santos
Land Vieira	Tarcísio Pereira dos Santos
Luana Martau	Patrícia Lombardi
Marcella Rica	Lucimara Amâncio (Luli)
Marcella Valente	Suzana
Raquel Fuina	Glória Pereira dos Santos
Rafael Miguel	João Carlos Amâncio Tibiriçá (Juca)
Roumer Canhães	Professor Limonge
Ronny Kriwat	Pedro de Britto Brandão
Wagner Molina	Fiasco
Selma Lopes	Dirce

Guest actors

Actor	Character
Pedro Paulo Rangel	Ferdinando Brandão

Guest actresses

Actress	Character
Berta Loran	Loló
Yoná Magalhães	Adalgisa Monteiro de Britto
Suely Franco	Julieta Almeida Brandão

Special guest star

Actor	Character
Luís Gustavo	Waldemar Moreira

Supporting cast

Actor	Character
Monique Alfradique	Érica Castiglione
Antônio Pitanga	Miguel dos Santos
Ana Cecília Costa	Leda de Lucca
Ed Oliveira	Jair
Rodrigo Rangel	Antônio
Marcelo Portinari	Jorjão
Bia Arantes	Maria Eduarda Império (Duda)
Guilherme Vieira	Igor Yohannce
Henrique Ramiro	Marco Antônio Lobato (Macau)
Juliana Paiva	Beth
Júlia Mattos	Sandrinha
Alex Moreno	Lucas Porto (Luck)
Neusa Maria Faro	Gioconda Amâncio
Maurício Machado	Paulo Otávio Barbosa (Pink)

== International Exhibition ==
- Brazil – Globo
- Portugal – SIC
- Portugal – RTP Internacional
- Albania – DigitAlb
- Costa Rica – Teletica
- Nicaragua – Televicientro
- Puerto Rico – WAPA-TV
- Chile – Canal 13
- Ecuador – Ecuavisa
- Bolivia – Canal Unitel
- Uruguay – Teledoce
- Andorra – Ràdio i Televisió d'Andorra
- Peru – ATV
- El Salvador – TCS Canal 4
- Paraguay – SNT
- Honduras – Vica TV
- Israel – Viva
- Dominican Republic – Tele Antillas Canal 2
- Mozambique – STV-Soico
- France – France Ô
- Venezuela – TeleSUR
- New Zealand – TV3
- Italy – RAI
- Sweden – ZTV
- Angola – TV Globo Internacional
- United States – TV Globo Internacional
- Indonesia – Vision 2 Drama
- Spain – Nueve
- Russia – Viva
- Morocco – 2M
- Cameroon – Canal 2 Internacional
- Kenya – Kenya
- Uganda – Uganda

== Soundtrack ==
=== National ===
- Capa: Camila Pitanga
1. "Porque Eu Sei Que é Amor" - Titãs
2. "Pra Você Guardei Amor" - Nando Reis e Ana Cañas
3. "Um Dia, um Adeus" - Vanessa da Mata
4. "Seu Olhar (ao vivo)" - Seu Jorge
5. "Linda Rosa" - Maria Gadú
6. "Sou Eu" - Diogo Nogueira
7. "Pedindo Pra Voltar" - Marisa Monte
8. "Pot-pourri: Beija-flor/Mel na Sua Boca" - Marina Lima
9. "O Mundo" - Moska
10. "Eu Não Sou Santo" - Exaltasamba
11. "Vem Comigo Que Eu Te Levo Pro Céu" - Marcelo D2
12. "Pelo Avesso" - Titãs
13. "La Plata" - Jota Quest (Tema de Verônica)
14. "Amar é Perdoar (Don't Know Why)" - Fábio Jr.
15. "Odeon" - Fernanda Takai
16. "Toda Criança Quer" - Palavra Cantada
