= List of awards and nominations received by Avenida Brasil =

Avenida Brasil (Brazil Avenue (Note: Official name in English.)) is a Brazilian telenovela that aired on Rede Globo from 26 March to 19 October 2012.

== Awards and nominations ==
Year	Award	Category	Nominated	Result	Ref
2012	Meus Prêmios Nick	Favorite Actor	Cauã Reymond	Won	
2012	Meus Prêmios Nick	Favorite Actor	José Loreto	Nominated	
2012	Meus Prêmios Nick	Favorite Actress	Débora Falabella	Nominated	
2012	Meus Prêmios Nick	Favorite Character	Adriana Esteves	Nominated	
2012	Prêmio Extra de Televisão	Best Telenovela	João Emanuel Carneiro	Won	
2012	Prêmio Extra de Televisão	Best Actress	Adriana Esteves	Won	
2012	Prêmio Extra de Televisão	Best Actress	Débora Falabella	Nominated	
2012	Prêmio Extra de Televisão	Best Actor	Cauã Reymond	Nominated	
2012	Prêmio Extra de Televisão	Best Actor	Marcello Novaes	Nominated	
2012	Prêmio Extra de Televisão	Best Actor	Murilo Benício	Nominated	
2012	Prêmio Extra de Televisão	Best Supporting Actress	Eliane Giardini	Nominated	
2012	Prêmio Extra de Televisão	Best Supporting Actress	Heloísa Perissé	Nominated	
2012	Prêmio Extra de Televisão	Best Supporting Actress	Ísis Valverde	Won	
2012	Prêmio Extra de Televisão	Best Supporting Actress	Leticia Isnard	Nominated	
2012	Prêmio Extra de Televisão	Best Supporting Actress	Vera Holtz	Nominated	
2012	Prêmio Extra de Televisão	Best Supporting Actor	Alexandre Borges	Nominated	
2012	Prêmio Extra de Televisão	Best Supporting Actor	Juliano Cazarré	Nominated	
2012	Prêmio Extra de Televisão	Best Supporting Actor	Marcos Caruso	Nominated	
2012	Prêmio Extra de Televisão	Best Supporting Actor	José de Abreu	Won	
2012	Prêmio Extra de Televisão	Child Revelation	Ana Karolina Lannes	Nominated	
2012	Prêmio Extra de Televisão	Child Revelation	Mel Maia	Won	
2012	Prêmio Extra de Televisão	Revelation	Bruno Gissoni	Nominated	
2012	Prêmio Extra de Televisão	Revelation	Cacau Protásio	Won	
2012	Prêmio Extra de Televisão	Revelation	Daniel Rocha Azevedo	Nominated	
2012	Prêmio Extra de Televisão	Revelation	José Loreto	Nominated	
2012	Prêmio Extra de Televisão	Best Costume Design	João Emanuel Carneiro	Nominated	
2012	Melhores e Piores TV Press	Best Actress	Adriana Esteves	Won	
2012	Melhores e Piores TV Press	Best Supporting Actor	Marcos Caruso	Won	
2012	Melhores e Piores TV Press	Best Set Design	João Emanuel Carneiro	Won	
2012	Capricho Awards	Best Program of TV	João Emanuel Carneiro	Nominated	
2012	Capricho Awards	Best Actor National	Bruno Gissoni	Nominated	
2012	Capricho Awards	Best Actress National	Ísis Valverde	Nominated	
2012	Troféu APCA	Critics Award	João Emanuel Carneiro	Won	
2012	Troféu APCA	Best Actress	Adriana Esteves	Won	
2012	Troféu APCA	Best Actor	José de Abreu	Won	
2012	Troféu APCA	Best Author	João Emanuel Carneiro	Won	
2013	Prêmio Quem de Televisão	Best Actor	Murilo Benício	Nominated	
2013	Prêmio Quem de Televisão	Best Actress	Adriana Esteves	Won	
2013	Prêmio Quem de Televisão	Best Actress	Débora Falabella	Nominated	
2013	Prêmio Quem de Televisão	Best Supporting Actor	Alexandre Borges	Nominated	
2013	Prêmio Quem de Televisão	Best Supporting Actor	José de Abreu	Nominated	
2013	Prêmio Quem de Televisão	Best Supporting Actor	Juliano Cazarré	Won	
2013	Prêmio Quem de Televisão	Best Supporting Actor	Marcello Novaes	Nominated	
2013	Prêmio Quem de Televisão	Best Supporting Actor	Marcos Caruso	Nominated	
2013	Prêmio Quem de Televisão	Best Supporting Actor	Otávio Augusto	Nominated	
2013	Prêmio Quem de Televisão	Best Supporting Actress	Eliane Giardini	Nominated	
2013	Prêmio Quem de Televisão	Best Supporting Actress	Cláudia Missura	Nominated	
2013	Prêmio Quem de Televisão	Best Supporting Actress	Ísis Valverde	Nominated	
2013	Prêmio Quem de Televisão	Best Supporting Actress	Débora Bloch	Nominated	
2013	Prêmio Quem de Televisão	Best Supporting Actress	Vera Holtz	Nominated	
2013	Prêmio Quem de Televisão	Revelation	Cacau Protásio	Nominated	
2013	Prêmio Quem de Televisão	Revelation	Daniel Rocha Azevedo	Won	
2013	Prêmio Quem de Televisão	Revelation	José Loreto	Nominated	
2013	Prêmio Quem de Televisão	Revelation	Letícia Isnard	Nominated	
2013	Prêmio Quem de Televisão	Revelation	Mel Maia	Nominated	
2013	Prêmio Quem de Televisão	Best Author	João Emanuel Carneiro	Won	
2013	Melhores do Ano	Best Actress	Adriana Esteves	Won	
2013	Melhores do Ano	Best Actress	Debora Falabella	Nominated	
2013	Melhores do Ano	Best Actor	Cauã Reymond	Nominated	
2013	Melhores do Ano	Best Actor	Marcello Novaes	Nominated	
2013	Melhores do Ano	Best Actor	Murilo Benício	Won	
2013	Melhores do Ano	Best Supporting Actor	José de Abreu	Nominated	
2013	Melhores do Ano	Best Supporting Actor	Juliano Cazarré	Won	
2013	Melhores do Ano	Best Supporting Actor	Marcos Caruso	Nominated	
2013	Melhores do Ano	Best Supporting Actress	Isis Valverde	Won	
2013	Melhores do Ano	Best Supporting Actress	Eliane Giardini	Nominated	
2013	Melhores do Ano	Best Supporting Actress	Vera Holtz	Nominated	
2013	Melhores do Ano	Best Female Revelation	Cacau Protásio	Nominated	
2013	Melhores do Ano	Best Female Revelation	Débora Nascimento	Nominated	
2013	Melhores do Ano	Best Male Revelation	Daniel Rocha Azevedo	Nominated	
2013	Melhores do Ano	Best Male Revelation	José Loreto	Nominated	
2013	Melhores do Ano	Best Child Performance	Ana Karolina Lannes	Nominated	
2013	Melhores do Ano	Best Child Performance	Mel Maia	Won	
2013	Troféu Imprensa	Best Telenovela	João Emanuel Carneiro	Won	
2013	Troféu Imprensa	Best Actress	Adriana Esteves	Won	
2013	Troféu Imprensa	Best Actor	Murilo Benício	Won	
2013	Troféu Imprensa	Best Actor	Cauã Reymond	Nominated	
2013	Troféu Imprensa	Revelation of the Year	Mel Maia	Nominated	
2013	Troféu Internet	Best Telenovela	João Emanuel Carneiro	Won	
2013	Troféu Internet	Best Actor	Murilo Benício	Won	
2013	Troféu Internet	Best Actress	Adriana Esteves	Won	
2013	Prêmio Contigo! de TV	Best Telenovela	João Emanuel Carneiro	Won	
2013	Prêmio Contigo! de TV	Best Actress	Adriana Esteves	Won	
2013	Prêmio Contigo! de TV	Best Actress	Débora Bloch	Nominated	
2013	Prêmio Contigo! de TV	Best Actress	Débora Falabella	Nominated	
2013	Prêmio Contigo! de TV	Best Actress	Isis Valverde	Nominated	
2013	Prêmio Contigo! de TV	Best Actor	Alexandre Borges	Nominated	
2013	Prêmio Contigo! de TV	Best Actor	Cauã Reymond	Nominated	
2013	Prêmio Contigo! de TV	Best Actor	Marcello Novaes	Nominated	
2013	Prêmio Contigo! de TV	Best Actor	Murilo Benício	Won	
2013	Prêmio Contigo! de TV	Best Supporting Actor	José de Abreu	Won	
2013	Prêmio Contigo! de TV	Best Supporting Actor	José Loreto	Nominated	
2013	Prêmio Contigo! de TV	Best Supporting Actor	Juliano Cazarré	Nominated	
2013	Prêmio Contigo! de TV	Best Supporting Actor	Marcos Caruso	Nominated	
2013	Prêmio Contigo! de TV	Best Supporting Actress	Débora Nascimento	Nominated	
2013	Prêmio Contigo! de TV	Best Supporting Actress	Eliane Giardini	Nominated	
2013	Prêmio Contigo! de TV	Best Supporting Actress	Heloísa Périssé	Nominated	
2013	Prêmio Contigo! de TV	Best Supporting Actress	Vera Holtz	Nominated	
2013	Prêmio Contigo! de TV	Revelation of TV	Cacau Protásio	Nominated	
2013	Prêmio Contigo! de TV	Revelation of TV	Daniel Rocha Azevedo	Nominated	
2013	Prêmio Contigo! de TV	Revelation of TV	Emiliano D’Avila	Nominated	
2013	Prêmio Contigo! de TV	Revelation of TV	Leticia Isnard	Nominated	
2013	Prêmio Contigo! de TV	Best Child Actor	Bernardo Simões	Nominated	
2013	Prêmio Contigo! de TV	Best Child Actress	Ana Karolina Lannes	Nominated	
2013	Prêmio Contigo! de TV	Best Child Actress	Mel Maia	Won	
2013	Prêmio Contigo! de TV	Best Author	João Emanuel Carneiro	Won	
2013	Prêmio Contigo! de TV	Best Director	Amora Mautner, José Luiz Villamarim e Ricardo Waddington	Won	
