= Dupla Identidade =

Brazilian telenovela by Glória Perez

- Genre: Crime drama Mystery; Thriller
- Created by: Glória Perez
- Directed by: Mauro Mendonça Filho; René Sampaio
- Starring: Bruno Gagliasso; Débora Falabella; Luana Piovani; Marcello Novaes; Marisa Orth; Aderbal Freire Filho
- Theme music composer: Andreas Kisser
- Country of origin: Brazil
- Original language: Portuguese
- No. of seasons: 1
- No. of episodes: 13

Production
- Editor: André Leite
- Camera setup: Multicamera
- Running time: 45 minutes
- Production company: Estúdios Globo

Original release
- Network: Rede Globo
- Release: September 19 – December 19, 2014

Dupla Identidade (literally Double Identity; English title: Merciless) is a 2014 Brazilian crime drama television series created by Glória Perez. It was produced and aired by Rede Globo. This was the first Brazilian series entirely recorded and post-produced in 4K.

== Plot ==
Eduardo Borges (Bruno Gagliasso), or Edu, is a young man above all suspicion: handsome, smart, and sensitive. However, his perfect man appearance is simply a mask that covers up his fearsome personality: a dangerous psychopath behind a number of crimes that have caught the police's attention. A cold, conniving, and callous criminal; a serial killer who kills purely out of pleasure.

Edu gets romantically involved with Ray (Débora Falabella), a compassionate and daring young woman who sees in him the personification of the perfect man. Erratic and emotionally unstable, Ray bets everything on this romance, letting herself be manipulated by her boyfriend, without suspecting his double life.

Unable to solve the murders, the police put together a team equipped with the most advanced forensic techniques, led by Chief Dias (Marcello Novaes) and the psychologist Vera (Luana Piovani), a specialist in criminal behavior. Both with contrasting personalities, they have already worked together in the past, and were once in a troubled relationship. This reencounter brings back old feelings, revealing that there still is a spark between them.

Due to a work-related matter, Edu manages to infiltrate the police. Oblivious to the fact that the killer is close by, they start an electrifying pursuit of the serial killer, who is deliberately leaving clues to challenge them. Edu becomes fascinated with playing mind games on Vera, who is determined to find out who the killer is and how he commits his crimes.

== Cast and characters ==
- Bruno Gagliasso as Eduardo "Edu" Borges/Brian Borges
- Débora Falabella as Rayane "Ray" Gurgel
- Luana Piovani as Vera Müller
- Marcello Novaes as Delegado Alexandre Dias
- Marisa Orth as Silvia Veiga
- Aderbal Freire Filho as Senador Oto Veiga
- Mariana Nunes as Dina
- Bernardo Mendes as Junior (Oto Veiga Junior)
- Luana Tanaka as Elda
- Paulo Tiefenthaler as Nelson Pereira
- Igor Angelkorte as Ivan
- Glaucio Gomes as Assis
- Felipe Hintze as Cícero
- Thiaré Maia as Claudia
- Brenda Sabryna as Tatiana "Tati" Dias
- Maria Eduarda Miliante as Larissa Gurgel

== Awards and nominations ==
| Year | Award | Category | Nominated work | Result |
|---|---|---|---|---|
| 2014 | Prêmio Extra de Televisão | Best Author | Glória Perez | Nominated |
| 2014 | Troféu APCA | Best Actor | Bruno Gagliasso | Nominated |
| 2014 | Troféu APCA | Best Director | Mauro Mendonça Filho | Nominated |
| 2014 | Melhores do Ano | Best Actor (Series/Miniseries) | Bruno Gagliasso | Won |
| 2014 | Melhores do Ano | Best Actress (Series/Miniseries) | Luana Piovani | Nominated |
| 2014 | Prêmio F5 | Best TV Series Creator | Glória Perez | Nominated |
| 2014 | Prêmio F5 | Best Actor (Series/Miniseries) | Bruno Gagliasso | Won |
| 2014 | Prêmio F5 | Best Supporting Actor (Series/Miniseries) | Marcello Novaes | Nominated |
| 2014 | Prêmio F5 | Best Supporting Actress (Series/Miniseries) | Débora Falabella | Won |
| 2014 | Retrospectiva UOL | Best Actor | Bruno Gagliasso | Won |
| 2014 | Retrospectiva UOL | Best Actress | Débora Falabella | Won |
