= The Sky Above =

- Film poster
- Portuguese: O Céu Sobre os Ombros
- Directed by: Sérgio Borges
- Written by: Sérgio Borges; Manuela Dias
- Starring: Edjucu Moio; Mário Jorge; Sarug Dagir
- Edited by: Ricardo Pretti
- Release date: November 2010 (Brasilia)
- Running time: 72 minutes
- Country: Brazil
- Language: Portuguese

The Sky Above (Portuguese: O Céu Sobre os Ombros; lit. 'The sky over the shoulders') is a 2010 Brazilian docudrama directed by Sérgio Borges. The film won five awards at the Brasilia Film Festival, including Best Picture.

== Awards ==
2011: Rotterdam International Film Festival

1. Tiger Award (Nominee)

2010: Brazilia Festival of Brazilian Cinema

1. Best Film (won)
2. Best Director (Sérgio Borges) (won)
3. Best Screenplay (Manuela Dias/Sérgio Borges) (won)
4. Best Editing (Ricardo Pretti) (won)
5. Special Jury Award (won)
