= Paulinho Moska =

Brazilian musician and actor

Moska
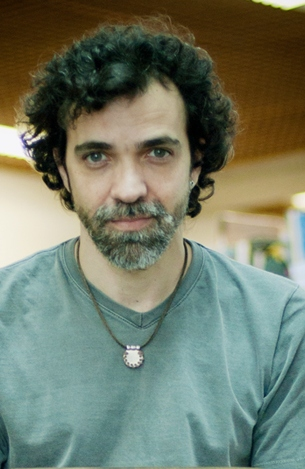

Background information
- Also known as: Moska
- Born: Paulo Corrêa de Araujo; 27 August 1967 (age 58)
- Origin: Rio de Janeiro, Brazil
- Genres: MPB, pop, rock
- Occupations: Singer, songwriter, actor
- Instruments: Voice, guitar
- Years active: 1987–present
- Website: www.paulinhomoska.com.br

Paulo Corrêa de Araujo, also known as Moska or Paulinho Moska (born 27 August 1967, in Rio de Janeiro), is a Brazilian singer-songwriter and actor.

He started to play the classical guitar when he was 13 years old, with friends. He graduated in theater and cinema from CAL (Casa de Artes de Laranjeiras), in Rio. He was a member of the band Garganta Profunda, that sang types of songs from Beatles and Tom Jobim to medieval operas. In 1987, he founded the band Inimigos do Rei ("King's enemies"), with old friends from the other band, Luiz Nicolau and Luis Guilherme.

== Cinema ==
In 2001, Moska worked in the film O Homem do Ano ("The Man of the Year"), starring Murilo Benício. In the movie, Moska plays the professional killer Enoque. The movie is directed by José Henrique Fonseca, story by Rubem Fonseca, Patrícia Melo and José Henrique Fonseca.

He took part in other films like Mulher, in 1998, and Amores Possíveis.

== Discography ==
=== CDs ===
- (1993) Vontade
- (1995) Pensar É Fazer Música
- (1997) Contrassenso
- (1997) Através do Espelho (Ao Vivo)
- (1999) Móbile
- (2001) Eu Falso da Minha Vida o Que Eu Quiser
- (2003) Tudo Novo de Novo
- (2004) Nova Bis – The Best Of (Coletânea)
- (2007) + Novo de Novo
- (2008) Zoombido
- (2010) Muito Pouco – 2 CDs

=== DVDs ===
- + Novo de Novo (2007)

== See also ==
- Música popular brasileira
