= Justiça =

2016 Brazilian miniseries

- Genre: Crime drama
- Created by: Manuela Dias
- Written by: Manuela Dias; Mariana Mesquita; Lucas Paraizo; Roberto Vitorino
- Directed by: José Luiz Villamarim; Isabella Teixeira; Luísa Lima; Marcus Figueiredo; Walter Carvalho
- Starring: Season 1: Adriana Esteves; Antônio Calloni; Camila Márdila; Cássio Gabus Mendes; Cauã Reymond; Débora Bloch; Drica Moraes; Enrique Díaz; Igor Angelkorte; Jéssica Ellen; Jesuíta Barbosa; Julia Dalavia; Júlio Andrade; Leandra Leal; Luisa Arraes; Luiz Carlos Vasconcelos; Vladimir Brichta
- Composer: Eduardo Queiroz
- Country of origin: Brazil
- Original language: Portuguese
- No. of seasons: 2
- No. of episodes: 48

Production
- Production locations: Recife, Pernambuco, Brazil; Federal District, Brazil
- Cinematography: Walter Carvalho
- Camera setup: Single-camera
- Running time: 34–52 minutes
- Production company: Estúdios Globo

Original release
- Network: Rede Globo
- Release: 22 August – 23 September 2016
- Network: Globoplay
- Release: 11 April – 23 May 2024

Justiça (English title: Above Justice) is a Brazilian television series created by Manuela Dias. Its first season aired on Rede Globo from 22 August to 23 September 2016 at 11 pm. The second season, titled Justiça 2, premiered on 11 April 2024 on the streaming platform Globoplay, and ended on 23 May 2024. In addition to Dias, the series is co-written Mariana Mesquita, Lucas Paraizo, Roberto Vitorino, João Ademir, and Walter Daguerre, and is directed by Isabella Teixeira, Luísa Lima, Marcus Figueiredo, Walter Carvalho, Gustavo Fernandez, Mariana Betti, Pedro Pelegrino, and Ricardo França, with general and artistic direction by José Luiz Villamarim.

Justiça is a drama that follows the lives of four characters who are arrested on the same day. After seven years, they are released and have to deal with the consequences of their imprisonment. These four independent stories are interconnected and provoke reflection on what justice is, based on the particular understanding of each character.

In Brazil, Justiça was received well by viewers and critics alike. The show had a daily reach of approximately 41 million viewers and a total reach of approximately 134 million viewers. The first four episodes were made available on Globoplay before the miniseries premiered on network television.

In 2017, the series was nominated for 45th International Emmy Awards in the best drama series categories and best actress for Adriana Esteves.

== Plot ==
=== Season 1 (2016) ===
The first season of Justiça features four stories connected by crimes that took place on the night of 26 June 2009, in Recife, Pernambuco. The first is that of Vicente, Isabela’s jealous and controlling boyfriend, who catches her having an affair with her ex-boyfriend and shoots her in front of her mother, Elisa, who later harbors a desire for revenge against Vicente, who is arrested for murder. The second story is that of Fátima, who shoots her neighbor Douglas’s dog to protect her son from an attack. Outraged, the neighbor—a police officer—plants drugs in her garden, and she is arrested as a drug dealer. The third story is that of Rose, who, while celebrating her birthday and passing her college entrance exam, is arrested for drug possession, while her white friend, Débora, is not. Upon her release from jail, Rose discovers that Débora has been abused and offers to help find the rapist. The final story is that of Maurício, who is married to the ballerina Beatriz, who becomes quadriplegic after being hit by a car. Unable to come to terms with her new condition, she begs her husband for euthanasia, and he is arrested for murder. Vicente, Fátima, Rose, and Maurício are taken to the same police station, and all are sentenced to seven years in prison; upon their release, they must grapple with the challenges of reintegrating into society.

=== Season 2 (2024) ===
Set in the cities of Ceilândia and Brasília, in the Federal District, Justiça 2 follows four more stories. The first plot centers on Balthazar, a motorcycle courier, who is wrongfully arrested after his former boss, Nestor, identifies him as the robber of the Canto do Bode restaurant in a digital police suspect database. The second story is that of Carolina, who was sexually assaulted by her uncle Jayme as a teenager and moved to another city to distance herself from the situation. When she returns to Ceilândia, she relives past traumas and decides to report her abuser. The third story is about Geíza and her daughter Sandra, who come into conflict with Renato, a middle-class drug dealer who has moved into their community, Sol Nascente, and disturbs them with his loud music playing 24 hours a day. One night, in a fit of rage, Renato attacks Sandra and is killed by Geíza, who tries to flee with her daughter but is caught and arrested. The fourth story is about Milena, who steals a car out of necessity to help her mother but ends up arrested for a murder she didn’t commit when a dead body is found in the trunk of the stolen car. Balthazar, Jayme, Geíza, and Milena are arrested on the same night, 7 November 2016, and after serving seven years, they must rebuild their lives.

== Cast ==
=== Season 1 ===
By order of appearance. Note that characters from one day may have cameos at other days.

Monday

- Débora Bloch as Elisa de Almeida
- Jesuíta Barbosa as Vicente Menezes
- Marina Ruy Barbosa as Isabela de Almeida
- Cássio Gabus Mendes as Heitor Diniz
- Camila Márdila as Regina Menezes
- Luiz Carlos Vasconcelos as Euclydes Menezes
- Pedro Nercessian as Téo Ferraz
- Priscila Steinman as Sara
- Giovana Echeverria as Vanessa
- Pedro Lamin as Otto
- Claudio Ferrario as Silas

Tuesday

- Adriana Esteves as Fátima Libéria do Nascimento
- Ângelo Antônio as Waldir do Nascimento
- Enrique Díaz as Douglas
- Leandra Leal as Arlete/Kellen Aparecida*
- Julia Dalavia as Mayara do Nascimento/Susi
  - Letícia Braga as Mayara do Nascimento (child)
- Tobias Carrieres as Jesus do Nascimento
  - Bernardo Berruezo as Jesus do Nascimento (child)
- Júlio Andrade as Firmino
- Clarissa Pinheiro as Irene
- Leandro Léo as Dez Porcento
- Alex Patrício Filho as Igor
- Márcio Fecher as Falcão
- Glauber Rocha as Jeferson
- Nicholas Bauer as Hans

Thursday

- Jéssica Ellen as Rose Silva dos Santos
- Luisa Arraes as Débora Carneiro
- Vladimir Brichta as Celso
- Igor Angelkorte as Marcelo Cavalcante
- Teca Pereira as Zelita Silva dos Santos
- Fernanda Viana as Lucy Carneiro
- Pedro Wagner as Osvaldo
- Murilo Sampaio as Tércio
- Carlos Feroli as CB

Friday

- Cauã Reymond as Maurício de Oliveira
- Antônio Calloni as Antenor Ferraz
- Marjorie Estiano as Beatriz Pugliesi
- Drica Moraes as Vânia Ferraz
- Mayara Millane as Tânia
- Joana Gatis as Lovilace
- Mariah Teixeira as Ariel
- Mohana Uchoa as Kika
- Nataly Rocha as Poltergeist
- Albert Tenório as Serge

* Leal reprises her role in the second season, being introduced in "Jayme Case".

=== Season 2 ===
In order of release

Balthazar case

- Juan Paiva as Balthazar Gomes da Silva
- Marco Ricca as Nestor Rebouças
- Maria Padilha as Silvana Rebouças
- Dja Marthins as Regina Pereira Gomes
- Jéssica Marques as Larissa
- Amir Haddad as Galdino
- Luciano Mallman as Cassiano Cardona
- Jorge Guerreiro as João Cardona
- Helena Kern as Maria Eduarda Rebouças

Jayme case

- Alice Wegmann as Carolina Teixeira
- Murilo Benício as Jayme Teixeira
- Júlia Lemmertz as Júlia Teixeira
- Adriano Garib como Olavo Ferrero
- Fábio Lago as Darlan
- Giovanni Venturini as Elias Teixeira
- Rita Assemany as Ingrid Teixeira
- Raíssa Xavier as Moema
- Túlio Starling as Gabriel
- Muse Maya as Ênya
- Aramis Trindade as Precinct Chief Dumas

Geíza case

- Belize Pombal as Geíza Lima
- Gi Fernandes as Sandra Lima
- Filipe Bragança as Renato Fayete
- Danton Mello as Abílio Fayete
- Vinicius Teixeira as Pascoal

Milena case

- Nanda Costa as Milena Souza de Jesus
- Paolla Oliveira as Jordana Juarez
- Marcello Novaes as Egisto
- Alexandre Rodrigues as Diógenes Juarez Junior (Diuzinho)
- Juliana Xavier as Ana Cristina da Silva / Luara
- Xamã as Naldo (Naldinho)
- Tereza Seiblitz as Santana Souza de Jesus

== Production ==
The first season of Justiça was shot in Recife, capital of Pernambuco, in an effort by Rede Globo to set some of its works outside of the Rio-São Paulo axis. According to the director, Recife was chosen due to its economic inequality being greater than the rest of the country, which gives the series more veracity. To Villamarim, "Recife is a synthesis of Brazil". In the municipality, Pina Beach, Boa Viagem Beach, Teatro de Santa Isabel, Palácio do Campo das Princesas, Mercado de São José and the Holiday Building were used as filming locations. In Olinda, some streets were used as location such as Ladeira da Misericórdia, among others, as well as Largo do Amparo. In Jaboatão dos Guararapes, the Barra de Jangada Beach was used. The way the story is told, interconnecting four different stories, was already used in movies such as Short Cuts, Crash and Babel. The cast preparation was done by Chico Accioly and rabbi Nilton Bonder.

In May 2022, TV Globo announced that the series would receive a new season shown exclusively on the Globoplay streaming service. The continuation of the production continues with the signing of Manuela Dias and the same format as the first season and expected to premiere in the second half of 2023. Recording began in March 2023 in Ceilândia and Sol Nascente, administrative regions of the Brazilian Federal District, ending in July at Estúdios Globo. The first teaser of the series was shown during a Grupo Globo panel at Rio2C. The characters of Alice Wegmann, Nanda Costa, Paolla Oliveira, Juan Paiva and Murilo Benício were the highlights in the first images.

== Episodes ==
Season	Episodes	Originally released	
Season	Episodes	First released	Last released
1	20	August 22, 2016	September 23, 2016
2	28	April 11, 2024	May 23, 2024

== Soundtrack ==
As announced by Globo. Justiça had as mean theme the song "Hallelujah", a Rufus Wainwright cover for the Leonard Cohen song, that was played in some scenes and trailers'.

- "Afterlife", Arcade Fire
- "O Que Será? (À flor da pele)", Chico Buarque feat. Milton Nascimento
- "O Que Será? (À flor da pele)", Caetano Veloso
- "Pedaço de Mim", Chico Buarque feat. Zizi Possi
- "Oração", Nuria Mallena
- "Amor Perfeito", Roberto Carlos
- "Gente Aberta", Erasmo Carlos
- "Último Romance", Los Hermanos
- "Risoflora", Elba Ramalho
- "Acabou Chorare", Novos Baianos
- "Revelação", Fagner
- "Crua", Otto
- "Pense em Mim", Johnny Hooker
- "Dona da Minha Cabeça", Geraldo Azevedo
- "Xique-xique", Tom Zé
- "Fui Fiel", Pablo

== Broadcast ==
The first season aired after Velho Chico from Monday to Friday except for Wednesdays. For the first time, Globo Repórter had its timetable changed.

== Ratings ==
The miniseries premiered with a total viewership of 26.2 points, the highest viewership since Amores Roubados (2014).

== Awards and nominations ==
Year	Organization	Category	Nominee(s)	Result	Ref.
2017	45th International Emmy Awards	Drama Series	—N/a	Nominated	
2017	45th International Emmy Awards	Best Performance by an Actress	Adriana Esteves	Nominated	
