= List of Justiça episodes =

Justiça (English title: Above Justice) is a Brazilian television series created by Manuela Dias. The first season aired on Rede Globo on 22 August 2016.

The series follows the lives of four characters who are arrested on the same day. After seven years, they are released and have to deal with the consequences of their imprisonment. These four independent stories are interconnected and provoke reflection on what justice is, based on the particular understanding of each character. The second season premiered on 11 April 2024 on the streaming platform Globoplay, and is set to run for 28 episodes.

In 2017, the series was nominated for 45th International Emmy Awards in the best drama series categories and best actress for Adriana Esteves.

== Series overview ==
Season	Episodes	Originally released	
Season	Episodes	First released	Last released
1	20	August 22, 2016	September 23, 2016
2	28	April 11, 2024	May 23, 2024

== Episodes ==
=== Season 1 (2016) ===
The first season all episodes was written by Manuela Dias, co-written by Mariana Mesquita, Lucas Paraizo and Roberto Vitorino, and it was directed by Isabella Teixeira, Luísa Lima, Marcus Figueiredo and Walter Carvalho, with general and artistic direction by José Luiz Villamarim.

No. overall	No. in season	Title	Original release date	Brazil viewers (Note: each point is equivalent to 69,400 households in the Greater São Paulo area and 43,300 in the Greater Rio de Janeiro area)
1	1	"Vicente 1"	August 22, 2016	29.6 points
In 2009, Isabela is a rich girl engaged to Vicente, son of Euclydes Menezes, the rich owner of a public bus company. Her mother Elisa is not sure whether her daughter is truly meant for Vicente, and the young man is jealous of Otto, a former boyfriend of Isabela. Meanwhile, Antenor, Euclydes' business partner, steals a large amount of money and leaves, leaving the company on the verge of bankruptcy and causing a strike among employees. Unable to see a good future for himself, Vicente starts drinking and arrives home only to catch Isabela in the shower with Otto. He fatally shoots her in front of Otto and Elisa. Elisa holds Isabela's body and cries, while Otto grabs Vicente, who is subsequently arrested. At the precinct, he sits beside Fátima, Rose and Mauricio and is called for his mug shot (such scene is repeated at the end of the three next episodes, each time with the episode' protagonist). Also, a picture of Vicente is shown at the front page of a local newspaper with a headline that reads: "Son of broken businessman kills fiancée". The three other events taking place in the next episodes are also cited in the same page. In 2016, Vicente is about to be released from prison. Elisa, who has been practicing shooting, tries to finish her relationship with her new boyfriend Heitor (the rector of a local university) and ends up revealing that the reason is her plan to execute Vicente as soon as he leaves prison and face the criminal charges that will follow, since she thinks his punishment was not enough. Vicente leaves prison and as Elisa prepares to kill him with a headshot from a distance, he is greeted by a child (his daughter) and his new wife, Regina. Elisa hesitates and lowers her pistol.
2	2	"Fátima 1"	August 23, 2016	28.4
In 2009, Fátima is a maid at Elisa's house and lives in the suburbs with her husband Waldir, a bus driver at Euclydes' company, and their two kids, Jesus and Mayara. Their neighbor is Douglas, a sergeant at the Pernambuco Military Police who lives with his wife and his aggressive German Shepherd Furacão ("Hurricane"), who constantly breaks in Fátima's lot and kills her chicken. One day, Waldir gets himself involved in a bar fight and is severely injured and consequently hospitalized. Later that night, Furacão attacks again, this time targeting Fátima's kids. The officer manages to control his dog, but not before he bites Jesus. Infuriated, Fátima shoots the animal down. The next day, police officers search her house and find some cocaine. She is subsequently arrested and forced to abandon her children, and immediately deduces Douglas planted the drug for a revenge. Also, a picture of Fátima is shown at the front page of a local newspaper with a headline that reads: "Dog exterminator was a drug dealer". The three other events taking place in the previous and next episodes are also cited in the same page. In 2016, she is released from prison and heads to her neighborhood, only to find her house abandoned. She grabs a machete and spots a drunk Douglas, who admits his plan to have her arrested and denies being aware of her family's whereabouts.
3	3	"Rose 1"	August 25, 2016	27.7
Rose and her mother Zelita live at Lucy's house, where Zelita works as a maid. Having grown together, Rose and Lucy's daughter Débora are best friends. In 2009, Rose passes the vestibular to a local university where she intends to study Journalism. Later, both girls head to a beach party to celebrate Rose's 18th birthday. There, they buy some drugs from Rose's boyfriend Celso, who runs a kiosk at that beach. Soon afterwards, police officers led by Douglas show up and search some people, including Rose, who is found to be in possession of some drugs and is subsequently arrested. Débora, who also had some drugs on her, was spared from the search and allowed to leave by the officers. Zelita is disappointed that Débora did not help Rose and leaves Lucy's house. Also, a picture of Rose is shown at the front page of a local newspaper with a headline that reads: "Drug dealer had been approved in the vestibular". The three other events taking place in the previous and next episodes are also cited in the same page. In 2016, Rose is released from prison and heads to Lucy's house, where Débora lives alone with her husband, Marcelo, who reluctantly agrees to have Rose live there for a brief time. The girls head to a restaurant where Débora reveals she had been raped while Rose was doing time and that since then she is unable to become pregnant. Rose assures her that there is a way they can find the rapist and Débora expresses her will to do it.
4	4	"Mauricio 1"	August 26, 2016	26.2
In 2009, accountant Mauricio visits his wife, dancer Beatriz, at the hospital, where she lays quadriplegic after a hit and run caused by Antenor. He films her last request, which is for him to kill her. In the video, she assures the decision is hers and asks that Mauricio is not judged for that. The accountant then proceeds to kill her by injecting her with a drug cocktail. Three days earlier, it is shown that Mauricio worked for Euclydes and had just found out about Antenor's betrayal. The thief prepares to leave the country and heads to the airport in a hurry. When trying to overtake a bus (driven by Waldir and having Rose and Débora as passengers), he ends up hitting Beatriz, and the accident is witnessed by Elisa, who was having dinner nearby. Antenor checks on the scene from a distance, but flees. Later that night, Mauricio heads to the beach where Débora and Rose were celebrating just as the police is about to leave. He buys some drugs from Celso which he will later use to kill Beatriz as shown earlier in the episode. Afterwards, he is arrested. Also, a picture of Beatriz is shown at the front page of a local newspaper with a headline that reads: "Euthanasia: First ballet dancer of Pastora Theater dies". The three other events taking place in the previous episodes are also cited in the same page. In 2016, he is released from prison and Celso picks him up. At Celso's crib, they collect some money Mauricio made as an accountant for criminals and with which he plans to finance a plan to kill Antenor, who is now running for governor of Pernambuco.
5	5	"Vicente 2"	August 29, 2016	27.1
Elisa reflects with Heitor on her hesitation to execute Vicente. The young man pays her a visit and asks for forgiveness, but she refuses. Nevertheless, she allows him to use the toilet. On his way, he stops by the bedroom in which they used to sleep, where he cries and feels sick. He begs for forgiveness one more time, but is kicked out of the apartment as Elisa calls him a murderer. Later, Heitor exits the building, finds Vincent sitting by the street and offers him a ride home. On the way, Heitor says Vicent has paid for his crime, and the boy reveals that he tried to kill himself several times until his daughter was born. On the next day, Fátima pays Elisa a visit and asks for a job. Elisa says she already has a long-standing maid, but gives her a full updated salary. Later, she stops by Vicente's apartment and watches him with some binoculars, then leaves. On the next day, Heitor introduces her as the new professor of Philosophy of Law. As soon as she starts her class, she spots Vicente sitting among the students and leaves the room. Heitor tries to convince her Vicente is regretful, but she still has too much hatred for him. At the toilet, a student named Vanessa hides in one of the cabins and cry. It was shown earlier in the episode that the student was, unbeknownst to her, videotaped earlier performing a blowjob in another student (Téo Ferraz, son of Antenor). The video was leaked to many students of the university. After a few attempts to get her out of the cabin, her friend Sara, Elisa and a security guard force the door open only to find out that Vanessa self-defenestrated and ended up severely injured. Following the commotion, Téo is almost lynched, but police officers (Douglas included) contain the crow just as Rose and Débora pass by – both visited Heitor and asked him to allow Rose again in the university, but the rector denies, stating that because she never matriculated, the system gives her vacancy to another student. Seeking protection, Téo hires a gun from Celso and enters Elisa's class. All students around him move to farther seats. Elisa is angry at the disturbance and says no matter how wrong their actions were, nobody has the right to interrupt her class, specially because everyone shared the video regardless of criticizing Téo. Later, she pays a visit to Isabela's grave, where Vicente once again begs her for forgiveness.
6	6	"Fátima 2"	August 30, 2016	28.5
Fátima wakes up at home one night and realizes Douglas' house is on fire. She rescues him and puts the fire out. Douglas feels ruined that his wife Kellen left him some time ago for Celso. On the next day, he informs Fátima that her daughter Mayara was last seen working by the beach as a prostitute named Susi. There, she talks to a pimp, who gives her a catalog of prostitutes, but Mayara is not listed. Later, she meets Elisa as described in the episode above and heads to a bar where she buys some food from Regina, do some shopping and has a drink near an amateur musician (Firmino). Later that night, Douglas makes a copy of Mayara's picture and heads to the beach to search for her the morning after. He eventually finds out she's working for Celso and confronts him from outside of his kiosk, to no avail. Meanwhile, Fátima starts selling food on the streets and meets Firmino again as she offers some construction workers free samples of her food. Later, she is robbed by three homeless children. She catches one of them, only to find out it's her son Jesus, whom she lets go with her purse. Later, the boy realizes she's her mother and uses the stolen money to buy a bus ticket back home. Later, the two reunite. On the next day, Fátima finally finds Mayara by the pimp house where she works for Kellen, who's unaware of her true identity. They have a brief conversation before she has to rejoin her colleagues for a trip. Fátima watches as the car full of prostitutes exists the garage.
7	7	"Rose 2"	September 1, 2016	26.3
Débora tells Marcelo there may be a way to locate her raper, but he tells her she should just forget about this. Later, she joins Rose in a visit to her mother's grave. the two go to the beach and Celso offers Rose a job at his kiosk, which she accepts. She also goes back to prison to visit a friend, who asks her to take her daughter to her sister, with some cocaine hidden in the baby's diaper. She secretly takes the baby to Marcelo's, but he and Débora find out and Marcelo is unhappy. On the next day, she makes the delivery and heads to the university with Débora to try a way back to college as described in episode 5 above. Kellen shows up at Celso's kiosk and goes bitter on Rose to prevent her from trying to hook with her boyfriend - they do it, anyway. On the next morning, Débora learns about a rape at the same alley where she was violated. She pays a visit to the victim at the hospital and learns it was the same guy who raped her. Based on her descriptions, a friend of Celso draws a facial composite of the criminal. It is shown that the raper works is a janitor window cleaner and uses his position to peek on women inside their apartments. It is also revealed that Marcelo accidentally killed his own brother in their youth by playing with their father's gun, which is why he rejects using violence as a response to the rape.
8	8	"Mauricio 2"	September 2, 2016	27.1
Mauricio cries watching a video of him with Beatriz. Later, he and Celso meet Antenor and propose a support to his campaign with money from Celso's whorehouse. It's all a plan to get closer to Antenor without raising suspicion. Kellen takes the politician for a tour around the place and then leaves him with Susi. On the next day, Mauricio and Celso meet again with Antenor on his yacht, but the meeting is interrupted when his son, Téo, calls him to talk about the events shown at episode 5. Antenor heads to the university and settles a deal with Heitor so that there's no fuzz about it in the press. Maurício buys Antenor a helicopter and sabotages it. Later, he Antenor and Celso land on a mansion where Kellen and Susi are waiting for them and Antenor leaves with the aircraft. Later, Celso watches the news and learns that Mauricio's plan worked, but Antenor survived. Téo is suspicious, but Antenor still trust the accountant. The candidate holds a press conference to comment on the incident.
9	9	"Vicente 3"	September 5, 2016	27.5
Vicente tells Elisa Isabela was pregnant of him, but she aborted the child. The professor is shocked with the revelation, but offers Vicente a ride to the university. When they arrive, Téo is threatening fellow students with a gun after finding out that his car has been vandalized and Vanessa films all action. Elisa hits his gun with a shot and successfully disarms him. Later at her class, she is applauded by her students, but dismisses the reception as unnecessary and clarifies she is allowed to carry a weapon. Téo is expelled from the university despite his father's attempts to diminish the incident and Celso demands him to have his pistol fixed. Later, Elisa tells Heitor she now agrees Vicente regrets his actions. That night, Regina reprehends Vicente for still having a picture of Isabela and asks him to bury his past. On the next day, Vicente takes his daughter (also named Isabela) to the university, where she is introduced to Elisa. The three go to a restaurant and have dinner while Regina unsuccessfully tries to call him in a bar where Vânia karaokes out of tune. At the restaurant, Vicente tells Elisa his father died of heart attack soon after he was arrested. Elisa asks him if he ever contemplated revenge, to which Vicente replies he has no money and no proof that Antenor robbed his father and that all he wants is to rebuild his life. Isabela asks Elisa to be her baptism godmother, and Elisa accepts. At the ceremony, Regina, disturbed by Elisa's presence, secretly scratches her car with her nail.
10	10	"Fátima 3"	September 6, 2016	19.7
Mayara pays her mother a visit. She gives her a necklace she stole from a customer so she can make some money, but Fátima rejects "dirty money". Jesus later tells his sister he can sell it. Meanwhile, Téo buys a gun from Douglas at his house. Fátima buys some food and finds out Jesus tricked one of their customers into leaving a bigger change. She reprehends him and orders him to return the money to the construction worker - the one who sings at a bar. Jesus sells the necklace to Celso, but he is followed by his former street friends who want a part of it. While hiding inside a boat, he sees his mother falling through a broken pier and is forced to reveal himself. He later has Douglas help him locate the boys just as they attempt to steal Regina at the beach and retrieves part of the money. Kellen discovers Rose's pictures with the necklace at Celso's cellphone and confronts Mayara over selling it to Celso. Douglas seduces Irene, who works at the university's snack bar.
11	11	"Rose 3"	September 8, 2016	24.5
Débora makes a tattoo on herself, to Marcelo's and Rose's surprise. Later, the couple go to a local adoption center to deliver the papers and Marcelo finds the facial composite of the raper in her purse. He subsequently leaves Débora temporarily, since he wants to build a family and all she wants is revenge. Celso and Rose have a night together and he gives her the necklace he bought from Jesus. Kellen watches from behind a tree as they kiss each other goodbye. On the next day, Mayara approaches Rose introducing her as Andréia and asks questions about Celso. Later, Lucy asks Rose not to talk about the raper with Débora anymore. Rose agrees, but immediately leaves with Celso because he has spotted the raper. Débora is informed, leaves her children alone in the classroom (including Isabela) and heads to the location where the criminal is being beaten up by Celso's thugs. As she takes a closer look at his face, she finds out he's the wrong guy. Feeling guilty, she takes him home even after being warned that he is a robber. Marcelo returns and is furious with the outcome of Elisa's crusade. He leaves her permanently. Later that night, the criminal steals some objects and flees. In the morning, the girls find out about the robbery. Later, Débora is fired for abandoning her children in the day before.
12	12	"Mauricio 3"	September 9, 2016	25.9
With the help of Antenor, Kellen's business is finally allowed to operate legally, now under the name "Snack Night Club". However, a drunk Vânia tracks Antenor and confronts him over his relationship with Mayara, slapping her in the process. In the next morning, he reprehends her and Téo for constantly disturbing his campaign. He also confiscates Téo's credit cards. It is later shown that he stole his own parents to obtain the money and the objects he used in order to buy a weapon from Douglas, as shown in episode 10. Antenor is later seen trying to buy Vanessa's silence about Téo's actions. Mauricio tells Celso he has given up killing Antenor, but still wants to ruin his life. He has Celso follow Vânia and later seduces her at the karaoke where she was seen singing while Regina took shelter from the rain in episode 9. Later, Vânia tells him several of her husband's dirty secrets, which he secretly records.
13	13	"Vicente 4"	September 12, 2016	24.7
Regina is jealous that Vicente is contemplating accepting a position at the university's library offered by Elisa. Elisa offers Fátima an opportunity to work covering her maid's holidays. While doing her cleaning, she finds a box, which Elisa opens, only to find some pictures of Isabela and Vicente and a note she left criticizing Vicente's drinking. Vicente pays Elisa a visit to discuss his master's degree project, which Elisa will coordinate. Elisa drops him off at Vicente's building, and they kiss. Débora sees from the distance and confronts Elisa at the university's snack bar, an argument Sara secretly records and sends to Heitor. Later, Vicente and Regina argue about Regina's outrage. Meanwhile, Sara interviews Heitor and starts showing signs of an allergic reaction. Heitor takes her to a pharmacy and they later have dinner and sex. Heitor feels guilty about it and Sara secretly leaves a bra under his car seat. Later that night, Elisa remembers Isabela revealing to her that she never finished high school and that she spent several months of her senior year skipping class to walk around the city. On the next day, Heitor confronts Elisa about the video he received of her argument. Later, he reveals to Vicente Elisa's aborted plan to kill him. Later, Elisa finds Sara's bra and leaves Heitor's car. That night, Vicente goes to Elisa's to confront her about her plan to kill him. They have an emotional argument, but end up kissing.
14	14	"Fátima 4"	September 13, 2016	24.4
Fátima finds a vessel full of cocaine buried in her backyard. She throws some of it at Douglas' face just as he invites her to be godmother at his and Irene's wedding. Douglas then has a memory of how Kellen suggested him to plant the drug at Fátima's house as he dug a grave for Furacão. He then tells Fátima he is sorry. Fátima believes him and accepts his invitation out of respect for Irene - to whom Douglas later proposes. Douglas heads to Kellen's club, invites her to the wedding and barely escapes being seduced by her. Later, the raper shows up at the restaurant where Firmino works and talks to him privately. It is revealed that he is named Osvaldo and they are brothers. He asks Firmino for shelter, but the musician strongly refuses. On the next day, it is revealed that Fátima is forced to give some food to a police officer in order to be allowed to operate at the construction site. Kellen takes a picture of Mayara talking to Rose and confronts her about it. Mayara finally reveals her true identity to her pimp and admits she only joined the club to avenge her parents. Kellen wounds her arm with a blade and leaves. The girl is hospitalized, but Celso wants to keep it all a mere work accident. Fátima accepts, but demands her daughter to be fired. She later goes to Kellen's club and warns her not to touch her daughter again.
15	15	"Rose 4"	September 15, 2016	25.9
Débora spots Osvaldo at Elisa's building. Meanwhile, Rose runs a pregnancy test, which turns out positive. Débora tells her of her finding and Rose recommends she let go of the revenge. Débora is disappointed that Rose is also trying to discourage her. Later, she heads to Elisa's building and obtains Osvaldo's company contact. Meanwhile, Mayara talks to Rose once again and reveals her true name and her intention of avenging her family's tragedy. Débora follows Osvaldo down a street. He notices and forces her into his car, where he attempts another rape, but she manages to break free. He then warns her not to follow him again and takes off. When she gets home, she is visited by a social worker willing to check her house and evaluate her capability of adopting a child. Rose arrives some minutes later and Débora introduces her as a maid, which offends her. Rose later reveals her pregnancy to Celso and he is happy he'll be a father. Marcelo pays Débora a visit and says he's not willing to get back to her for as long as she seeks revenge. Rose is informed that her prison friend has died and contemplates adopting her child. That night, she leaves Débora's to go live with Celso. Débora tells them she has found the raper and ask Celso for help again. Later, Marcelo returns and ask her if she put Rose out and if she gave up about Osvaldo. She lies and they have sex.
16	16	"Mauricio 4"	September 16, 2016	25.7
Mauricio records a video of a drunk Vânia listing a series of crimes committed by her husband. Later, at the nightclub, he tells Celso they can end Antenor with that. Celso tells Kellen Rose is pregnant of him and she will live with him, forcing the pimp to share a room with her prostitutes at her club. She spends the next day following Celso and takes a shot of Mayara talking to Rose at his kiosk. That night, Antenor and Vânia are drunk and fight, with Vânia coming out injured. In the next morning, Antenor gives Vânia some money to apologize for the fight and says she can find some more by one of his fake NGOs. Vânia secretly records the conversation. She also unboxes some money Celso sent to Antenor to finance his campaign. Later, Mauricio has her deliver a video interview to Lucy in which she reveals Antenor's crimes. In the middle of a live television debate, the video is aired and the population immediately reacts with protests against the candidate. Vânia goes to a hotel where she expects to meet Mauricio, who is in another part of town having a drink, contemplating a billboard of Antenor's campaign and remembering Beatriz's accident.
17	17	"Vicente 5"	September 19, 2016	25.4
Regina storms in Elisa's apartment by the morning and has a heated discussion with Vicente and Elisa. The couple goes home and Elisa feels guilty for sleeping with her own daughter's murderer. Also, Vicente leaves Regina's apartment. Heitor is hosting an autograph session for his new book, where Sara is serving as an assistant. Elisa comes by and has an argument with Sara when the latter provokes the former. Later, she tells Heitor she should have killed Vicente. Meanwhile, Vicente collects some money from Antenor, who makes it clear he is not admitting he robbed Euclydes. In the next morning, he gives Regina a part of it and says he will fix his life. Heitor takes Elisa to a bridge where she throws her gun in the water. Vicente has his master's degree project approved, though Elisa is no longer going to be his coordinator. Afterwards, he offers Elisa a ride and she tells him she will never forgive him, but is feeling better now, anyway. A truck suddenly hits their car and Vicente suffers severe injuries. Elisa hesitates about calling emergency and he dies. At his funeral, Regina tells Elisa she suspects she had something to do with his death. Later, Elisa finally disposes of Isabela's belongings. Regina is seen practicing with a pistol at an abandoned building.
18	18	"Fátima 5"	September 20, 2016	26.1
It is shown that Irene has imposed a healthy diet on Dougla's house and he is constantly hiding from her in order to eat his favorite foods. Following the incident saw at the beginning of the previous episode, Fátima quits her job at Elisa's. On the next day, she confronts the police officer who extorts her everyday by the construction site and he takes her in his car for a ride with two other colleagues. Jesus photographs the car as it leaves and seeks help from Firmino and Douglas. The officers take Fátima to an abandoned building where she is ordered to shoot a dead man. She refuses and shoot the officer instead. The cops chase her inside the building, but Douglas and Firmino rescue her. That night, Kellen returns to Douglas and they readily resume their relationship in front of a shocked Irene, who leaves the house, humiliated. Meanwhile, Fátima and Firmino enjoy a night together. In the next morning, Fátima gives Douglas a new baby dog and is shocked to see that Kellen is back. Douglas tells Fátima he will travel with Kellen and the dog and leaves his house and Kellen's bike with her so she can sell them and have a part of the revenue in return. Later, at a beach resort, Kellen tells Douglas she plans to build another nightclub with some money she brought. Meanwhile, Firmino, Fátima and her children prepare a musical night for the community at Fátima's backyard where Firmino sings and proposes to her. She accepts.
19	19	"Rose 5"	September 22, 2016	25.8
Celso introduces Débora to two of his thugs. They are supposed to help her handle Osvaldo. A friend of Rose who was supposed to take care of Rose's prison friend's daughter is arrested for selling and Rose assumes responsibility for the baby. Marcelo tells Débora they are going to adopt a one-month toddler and that the social assistant will pay them a visit the day after - just when Débora is supposed to go after Osvaldo. That night, she has a memory of Osvaldo's last attempt to attack her. In the morning, she leaves just before the social assistant arrives and tells Marcelo she's going to the pharmacy. However, she enters a car with Celso's thugs and together they follow Osvaldo until they have a chance to capture him. The two men beat him up until he is left lying on the ground for Débora to do whatever he wants. He tells her he will get out of prison and rape her again because "that's what she wants and likes". Débora loses it and beats him to death with a metal pipe. Meanwhile, the social assistant, who was already at their house, starts questioning whether Débora really wants the adoption. Marcelo goes after her and learns about the incident at her school and her dismissal. When he returns home, he finds Débora's blood-covered clothes, and they lead him to a note with directions to Osvaldo's body. There, he finds another note, in which Débora tells her rape story, admits her murder and says "it was not revenge, but justice". She is seen hitchhiking by a highway. Marcelo gets rid of the note. Lucy is sent to cover the finding of Osvaldo's body and cries as she spots the pendant she had given Débora in a previous episode. Later, at the Snack Night Club, Celso and Rose prepare to move to another place and have a brief talk with Mauricio. Later, at the club's parking lot, Mauricio is hurt on an attempt on his life, frustrated by Celso's guards.
20	20	"Mauricio 5"	September 23, 2016	25.7
Mauricio watches a video of Beatriz dancing. Kellen pays Celso a final visit, collects her things and distributes some of her own clothes to her prostitutes as goodbye gifts. Later, she goes to Celso's apartment and finds some of the money Mauricio raised, which she later shows Douglas as seen in episode 18. Celso is infuriated when he learns about her robbery but Mauricio says she's earned the money for her work at the nightclub. Mauricio tells Vânia he's going to leave town without her. She accuses him of using her, and he replies explaining they both wanted to end Antenor, and they got it done. Antenor tries to have lunch at a restaurant, but is forced to leave after Sara and many other customers protest against him. Later, Téo finds out where Vânia is hiding and Antenor goes confront her at her hotel room. They have an argument, and she self-defenestates to her death. At her funeral, Antenor tells the press she had found out about another woman he had, which led to her betrayal and her suicide. As he leaves the cemetery, he is arrested as the hotel CCTV has caught him leaving the place soon after Vânia's death, making him a murder suspect. Téo tells the press he feels betrayed and that he intends to enter politics in the future to right his father's wrongs. Mauricio and Celso watch the news and celebrate. Later, he goes see Antenor in prison and finally reveals himself as the husband of the woman Antenor had hit-and-ran seven years before. Antenor sarcastically tells him he didn't kill Vânia, but Mauricio did kill Beatriz. Mauricio replies that justice is ironic and that Antenor, having committed countless crimes, was arrested for the one he didn't commit. Later, Mauricio suffers an attempt on his life, as shown in the previous episode. By his hospital bed, Celso says they can catch Antenor again. A TV news program airs the video of Antenor being expelled from the restaurant and Mauricio says life will take care of him. He drives away from the city and stops to Débora as she hitchhkes. The final scene shows a newspaper being printed with headlines that say: "Candidate Antenor Ferraz is arrested, but his son announces candidacy"; "Accident kills driver at intersection" (referring to Vicente's death); "Sex tourism raises in the city" (with a picture of Mayara with a client); and "Raper's body is found at abandoned house" (referring to Osvaldo's death).

=== Season 2 (2024) ===
The second season is written by Manuela Dias with the collaboration of Walter Daguerre and João Ademir, and it was directed by Mariana Betti, Pedro Peregrino and Ricardo França. The general and artistic direction of the season was by Gustavo Fernandez.

No. overall	No. in season	Title	Original release date
21	1	"Balthazar 1"	April 11, 2024
In 2016, in Ceilândia, motorcycle courier Balthazar is stopped and searched by the police, who take a photo of him without giving any satisfaction. Balthazar works in the Canto do Bode restaurant owned by Galdino, Silvana's father. Galdino's son-in-law, Nestor, advises his father-in-law to outsource services at his restaurant and go into fast food via an app. Balthazar buys a wheelchair for his grandmother Regina's birthday, which is sometimes taken care of by Larissa, Balthazar's girlfriend. Regina's health worsens and the drugs to treat her are expensive, forcing Balthazar to ask Galdino for an advance, but Nestor stops him. Balthazar starts working as a delivery man for the "!Pack" app, outsourcing to Canto do Bode, and strives to get good reviews. In financial difficulties, he leaves his motorcycle as collateral at the pharmacy where he buys his grandmother's medicine, and uses a bicycle borrowed from his girlfriend to get to work. Regina is hospitalized and Balthazar goes to Canto do Bode to seek compensation for outsourcing, only to be denied by Nestor, who threatens him. Later, the restaurant is robbed by two thieves and Nestor and Silvana blame Balthazar, who is arrested and later convicted of a murder he didn't commit. The next day, a local newspaper is printed with four stories and the headline of one of them reads: "Motorcycle courier is arrested for robbing the restaurant where he worked". In 2024, after leaving prison thanks to Cassiano Cardona, a paralyzed lawyer who managed to prove his innocence, Balthazar visits his grandmother's grave and is later surprised when Cassiano asks him for help to get revenge on Nestor, for the latter having left him in the wheelchair in the past.
22	2	"Jayme 1"	April 11, 2024
In 2016, Carolina returns to Ceilândia after ten years of living abroad and brings her husband Gabriel to meet her family, but their arrival is due to the bankruptcy of the kiosk where they worked in Rio de Janeiro. She doesn't feel comfortable in the presence of her uncle Jayme, who sexually abused her for two years when she was 15/16 years old, which is why she left home at the age of majority. Her family doesn't know about the crime, and they have always been financially supported by Jayme due to the profits from his supermarket. Jayme offers Gabriel a job in his supermarket in an attempt to leave Carolina in the city. One day, Julia, Carolina's mother, falls ill and needs medicine, which Jayme asks Carolina to pick up from his supermarket, as the delivery man has had an accident. She goes with Gabriel and when she enters her uncle's office alone, she is harassed by Jayme. Carolina tells her husband her story and together they decide to go back to Rio, and a worried Julia asks Jayme to convince her not to go. Carolina decides to tell her mother the truth about the past abuse, but Julia asks her not to denounce Jayme for the sake of the family's finances, which shocks Carolina. Upon learning the truth, Carolina's family accuse her of having seduced Jayme when she was a teenager and she argues with everyone. Carolina ends up denouncing her uncle, showing an old video of her being abused and Jayme is arrested. The next day, a local newspaper is printed with four stories and the headline of one of them reads: "Supermarket owner arrested for raping his niece". In 2024, Jayme is released from prison and thanks Nestor for making his life in prison easier over the last seven years, then returns to Júlia's house where he is welcomed and asks Carolina for forgiveness.
23	3	"Geíza 1"	April 11, 2024
In 2016, in the Sol Nascente region, manicurist Geíza lives with her daughter Sandra, who is preparing for the ENEM. Sandra doesn't want to take the exam, preferring to hand out pamphlets to earn money and help her mother, but Geíze doesn't accept this and advises the young woman to continue with her studies. A drug-dealing neighbor, Renato, moves in and starts disturbing the neighborhood with his loud music, intimidating anyone who asks him to turn it down. One of Geíza's clients is Kellen, who, after the events of the first season, moved to Federal District and is now married to Darlan, owner of the "dog-influencer" Bete. Kellen tells Geíza that she hasn't spoken to Douglas for a long time and that she now has a vision of entrepreneurship. A month later, Renato continues to disturb the neighborhood with his loud music. Geíza ends up arguing with him and breaks the speaker, enraging the young man who physically attacked the woman. Later, Abílio, Renato's father, tries to convince him to come home, but the boy doesn't accept and kicks his father out of the neighborhood. Sandra ends up arriving late at the school where she was going to take the ENEM, and the gates are closed, leaving her desperate. Later, Renato turns on his loudspeaker again, stressing out Sandra who swears at him a lot, causing him to break into her house and attack her. Geíza arrives in time to save her daughter and kills Renato by throwing a chair at his head. In a moment of desperation, the both decide to flee to Maranhão, but Geiza is caught and arrested for murder. The next day, a local newspaper is printed with four stories and the headline of one of them reads: "Middle-class drug dealer dies because of loud music". In 2024, Geíza is released from prison and reunited with her daughter, who now lives in a small apartment and works as a cleaner in a company. Sandra says that she used to live on the street, and in order to stabilize herself, she agreed to be part of a corruption scheme offered by Abílio, which shocks Geíza.
24	4	"Milena 1"	April 11, 2024
In 2016, Diógenes, the father of music entrepreneur Jordana, dies. She and her husband Egisto organize his private funeral at their home. Meanwhile, Milena, a young handyman with dreams of becoming a singer, goes out to carry out her last robbery with Nandinho and his gang, in the same neighborhood where Jordana and Egisto live. They pose as members of a moving company and take various items from a mansion. With the stolen items, Milena, who cracks safes, exempts herself from other robberies. At her father's wake, Jordana is visited by Diuzinho, a man who hands her a letter written by Jordana's father stating that Diuzinho is her half-brother. The woman is surprised by the news and then decides to speak to him in private. In a private conversation with her husband, Jornada expresses her desire to kill Diuzinho, since she doesn't want to share all her fortune and farms with him. In the office, Diuzinho claims he doesn't want any fortune, but ends up being drugged and shot by Jordana. The power is cut off at Milena's house and her mother, Santana, fights with her because she hasn't paid the bill. Milena decides to solve the problem, leaves the house and ends up stealing Egisto's car, which was passing through the area. Milena uses the car's battery to power her house and then discovers that Diuzinho has been shot in the trunk, who reveals a few names in a few words and dies. Jordana and Egisto decide to incriminate the person who stole the car so as not to be linked to Diuzinho's death, and while trying to dispose of the car with the body, Milena is caught and arrested by the police. At the police station, Milena even confronts Jordana, asking who the man who died in the car was. The next day, a local newspaper is printed with four stories and the headline of one of them reads: "After father's death, businesswoman has car stolen". Seven years later, in 2024, Milena is released from prison and seeks out Jordana at her record label. She reveals that she knows why her manager killed her half-brother, and asks her to help her rise professionally in the music business, in exchange for giving her Diuzinho's documents.
25	5	"Balthazar 2"	April 18, 2024
At the cemetery, Balthazar talks about how difficult the last few years in prison have been and tells Cassiano that he doesn't want to take revenge on Nestor and Silvana, even though he hates them. He meets up again with Larissa, who now works in a delivery cooperative, and he says he's going to look for stability. He looks for a job as a delivery man at Carolina's pet shop, but she tells him that they're not hiring and that she's leaving herself. He gets a cell phone from a lady for cleaning her yard and later returns to work for !Pack. On one of his deliveries, he meets Silvana again and, moved, tells her that he has been cleared of the crimes that landed him in jail. Silvana expresses her guilt at having sent someone innocent to jail for Nestor, now a wealthy politician. Nestor is not moved by what his wife says and asks her to stay away from Balthazar. Silvana also shows remorse when Geíza comes to do her nails, saying that this story happened to a friend of hers. Nestor goes to a private party where there are lots of rich men with their luxury escorts or mistresses, and there, Kellen shows up with some of her call girls, introducing herself as the owner of the "tourism agency" Las Primas. Senator Olavo goes out with one of the girls. The next morning, Balthazar goes for a waterfall bath with Larissa, and tries to get back together with her, but she refuses because she's engaged. Silvana buys a motorcycle to give to Balthazar as a way of redeeming herself. Out of necessity, he accepts, but Nestor finds out and orders two men to destroy the boy's motorcycle and beat him up.
26	6	"Jayme 2"	April 18, 2024
When Jayme returns, Carolina tells her mother that she is leaving Ceilândia. She says she'll try to get a job as an accountant at Jordana's record company in the Brasília area. Júlia is not happy about this and tells Jayme, who tries to persuade his niece to stay. Carolina goes to the record company, but Egisto doesn't hire her, saying that the company's accountant has decided not to give up the job and this leaves Carolina disappointed. Knowing that her mother was indirectly to blame for her not getting the job, because she told Jayme and he told Egisto, Carolina argues with Júlia and the latter falls ill. Júlia is hospitalized with a minor stroke and Carolina is harassed by Jayme in the hospital room where Júlia is resting. Júlia wakes up and argues with Jayme about grabbing her daughter. He decides not to help his sister financially and kicks her out of the family home. Carolina ends up meeting Darlan at the pet shop, after talking to Balthazar, and Darlan reveals that Kellen needs an accountant for her business. In order to pay for her mother's stay in hospital, Carolina explains her situation, is hired by Kellen and goes with her to the party from the previous episode. There she meets Jayme, who doesn't like her working with Kellen. Later, Carolina helps Moema, the call girl who went out with the senator, escape when Olavo overdoses in his room.
27	7	"Geíza 2"	April 18, 2024
Sandra regrets having agreed to take part in the corruption scheme, but assures Geíza that she doesn't receive any money, only her salary as a cleaner. Geíza doesn't judge her daughter, understanding that in Sandra's street situation, it would be impossible for her not to accept being a straw woman in the money laundering scheme and creates a hatred for Abílio. The next day, Sandra tells Abílio that she is going to move and wants to quit her job, which he says is not possible because of the deal they have. One year ago, in 2023, Nestor asks Abílio for his CPF number for the scheme. Abílio tries to politely deny it and Nestor recalls the favors he did him when Renato was causing trouble. On leaving work, Abílio is confronted by Sandra, who is cleaning car windshields in the street, and she follows him to his home demanding help. She explains that she lived for a while at a friend's house after her mother was convicted and then became homeless. Abílio offers her a job where he works, but on the condition that she is an straw woman for Nestor's scheme. Sandra accepts. In the present day, Abílio tells Nestor that Sandra wants to resign, and he doesn't accept. Geíza, looking after Silvana's nails as seen in episode 5, asks what would happen in court if someone signed papers without knowing the real issue, and disguises the story by saying she's a neighbor who wants to separate from her husband. Silvana can't answer for sure. Geíza asks Sandra to photograph the papers she has signed. Abílio gives Sandra an envelope of money at Nestor's behest so that she won't resign, but she returns the envelope and is determined to leave. Later, the corruption scheme is leaked and to prevent the scandal, Nestor asks Abílio to collect everything that could compromise him, and the next day he confronts Sandra. Sandra argues with Nestor and Abílio for persuaded her to be part of the scheme. Later, Geíza threatens Abílio in his apartment with a knife, demanding that he tell the press the whole truth.
28	8	"Milena 2"	April 18, 2024
Milena auditions for Jordana and Egisto, proving that she has musical talent. Jordana agrees to launch her career in exchange for Diuzinho's documents. Egisto doesn't like Jordana's idea, but she sees no danger in Milena, pointing out that she's smart. To get the documents, Milena talks to Luara, Diuzinho's girlfriend at the time of his death. Luara believes that Jordana killed her ex to avoid the division of assets, and advises Milena to think carefully about what she is going to do. Milena tells her mother the truth about the reason for her arrest. The next day, she signs a contract with Jordana Records and submits the documents. Milena undergoes a visual transformation to give her an artistic identity and goes to the party in episode 5 with Jordana. Egisto becomes increasingly suspicious and discovers Milena's address. He meets Santana, snoops around Milena's room and finds the folder with the copies of documents, but he can't take it. Milena substitutes for a singer who can't attend the party and starts to gain visibility on social media, much to Jordana's surprise. The next morning, Egisto takes Milena home and tells her about having seen the folder. During the night, Milena shows up at Jordana's house and hands over the folder with the copies of Diuzinho's documents and says that she didn't intend to use them. She reveals that Egisto went to her house out of suspicion. The situation then becomes tense between Jordana and Egisto.
29	9	"Balthazar 3"	April 25, 2024
In 2012, Cassiano was a professional swimmer and newly married to João. On the night of their wedding trip, the couple suffer a homophobic attack from Nestor in a bar. Nestor hits João with a racket and leaves Cassiano seriously injured, resulting in his paraplegia. In the present, Cassiano visits Balthazar in hospital and together they decide to take revenge on Nestor for everything he has caused them both. Balthazar returns to his humble hut, shows his love for Larissa and has sex with her, despite her being engaged to Tulio. Silvana questions what Nestor did to Balthazar and the man confesses that he had him beaten up and his motorcycle confiscated; he also punches Silvana in the abdomen. Silvana buys another motorcycle, this time anonymously, for Balthazar, who refuses the vehicle. Silvana confesses to all her husband's crimes and Balthazar films her without her realizing it, later showing the video to Cassiano, which results in an argument with João over her husband's fixation on revenge. Cassiano and Balthazar go to Geíza and Sandra's house to ask them to confess to Nestor's thefts and, later, the two women show up at Cassiano's house saying that Nestor wants to kill them. Nestor goes to his pre-candidacy rally for deputy in Brasília, where Milena is performing. Jayme tells Nestor that Sandra is going to give an interview to a journalist and tell him the whole truth about the scheme, and Nestor sends him to fetch the women since he knows the journalist. Cassiano, Balthazar, Geíza and Sandra are waiting for the journalist's driver, but Jayme arrives posing as the driver and takes Geíza and Sandra away. The women manage to escape from the car after seeing Nestor approaching in another car. Nestor chases them with a gun. After realizing that it was all a trap, Balthazar goes after them.
30	10	"Jayme 3"	April 25, 2024
Julia's stay in hospital is becoming more expensive and Carolina doesn't know what to do to pay off the high debt, but vows to pay the place off to avoid her mother being transferred to a public hospital. Jayme meets with Kellen to tell her that Nestor will give her a significant sum of money so that she can persuade Moema to declare herself the owner of the drugs that resulted in Senator Olavo's hospitalization. He also asks her to fire Carolina from her agency, but to no avail. Carolina questions her low salary at Kellen's agency, and Kellen suggests that she would make more money if she goes into prostitution. Kellen asks Carolina to help her persuade Moema to take responsibility for Olavo's drugs, which she does, but Moema runs off with the part of the money Kellen received, before being arrested. Carolina has no choice but to ask her uncle Jayme for a loan to pay off the hospital debt, but Jayme puts his hand on her private parts without permission, making Carolina back out of the deal. Jayme tells Júlia that Carolina works in a call girl agency, and later Carolina tells her mother that she's just an accountant for the place. Carolina tries to borrow money from her ex-husband Gabriel, but to no avail, and even talks to her aunt Ingrid who also denies her money. Kellen is forced to pay Nestor back the amount that Moema stole and in return demands that her agency's name not appear in the newspapers. She asks Nestor to make up a story to clean up the senator's image. Nestor is charmed by Carolina and asks Kellen to convince her to sleep with him, in exchange for which he will give her money to pay off the hospital debt. Carolina has no other choice, she meets up with Nestor and then pays the hospital bill to prevent her mother from being relocated elsewhere.
31	11	"Geíza 3"	April 25, 2024
With a knife, Geíza holds Abílio hostage and they enter the latter's apartment. Geíza finds Nestor's gun and in a fit of rage shoots at the wall, threatening to kill Abílio if he doesn't call Nestor to come to them. Abílio calls Nestor to come to his apartment and he offers Geíza money and protection in exchange for her stopping forcing them to give up Sandra. The next day, hours before Nestor is due to give an interview, Abílio shows up with the box of compromising things and Nestor asks him once again to keep it. Abílio then disposes of the files with fire and keeps Nestor's gun. Geíza and Sandra decide to flee to Goiás City and meet Cassiano and Balthazar as seen in episode 9. Sandra tells her mother that she felt Cassiano's words about offering help were true. After seeing Nestor's interview on TV, where he says that Sandra is a criminal, Geíza and her daughter decide to look for Kellen who knew the journalist who exposed Nestor's scheme, but they discover that he has been murdered. Mother and daughter decide to go to Cassiano for help, saying that Nestor could kill them and he urges them to tell the truth to Mauro, a journalist friend. During Milena's concert after Nestor's rally, as seen in episode 9, Abílio shows up to hand over Nestor's gun and confess to him that he burned all his files. When Jayme hears about Sandra's forthcoming interview, he informs Nestor, and them both go after Geíza and her daughter. After offering a lift to Geíza and Sandra posing as Mauro's driver, Jayme is attacked by the women who flee from the car. They are chased through the streets by Nestor. Geíza is shot in the leg. In a dead end, Sandra is shot by Nestor, while Balthazar watches the scene from afar.
32	12	"Milena 3"	April 25, 2024
Egisto confesses to Jordana that he went to Milena's house because he was suspicious of her, and points out that he was always right about the woman having copies of Diuzinho's documents. He makes Jordana think about Milena having an accomplice, since she discovered the documents after leaving prison, and asks Jordana to stay away from her. Egisto meets Jayme to receive his payment for selling his slot machines, but receives half the money, which makes him wonder whether or not he wants to give up his business. Jordana is advised not to be Milena's producer anymore, passing her on to producer Carlos Spíu. Spíu begins to demand a lot from Milena during rehearsals, leaving her tired and frustrated. Later, she meets up with Nandinho, who is now organizing street concerts, and she offers to do a performance afterwards. In a conversation with Jordana and Egisto, Milena asks them to continue investing in her because of the deal they made, even though the singer says she won't hurt them with the Diuzinho story. The power goes out in the studio and they are trapped in the room, Egisto starts to feel ill and Milena frees them by unlocking the door. After being released from hospital, Egisto and Jordana are opposed to keeping Milena around and Jordana leaves to disappear. She and Milena go to the concert organized by Naldinho and the singer is a hit, charming Jordana. The two women become closer and after Jordana agrees to manage Milena's career again, she books a concert at Nestor's rally. At the end of the performance, Luara meets Milena and asks her to give her money for also knowing about documents. The next morning, Milena asks Jordana for money with the story that her mother is going to have surgery, and when she receives it, she is confronted by Luara in front of the record company. Milena gives her the money, but them both are seen by Jordana on the security camera.
33	13	"Balthazar 4"	May 2, 2024
Sandra has been killed and Cassiano insists that Balthazar release the video he made of Silvana. The two men try to pay their respects at Sandra's funeral, but are expelled by Geíza. Balthazar tells Larissa Sandra's story and regrets not having prevented the girl's murder at Nestor's hands. Jayme tells Nestor his suspicions about where Carolina got the money to pay for the hospital. As seen in episode 10, Carolina arrives at a hotel to have sex with Nestor. After Sandra's death, Nestor appears on TV claiming his innocence in the money laundering scandal and says that Sandra was part of a gang. Balthazar and Cassiano leak the video of Silvana on the internet. João leaves Cassiano's apartment because of the repercussions of the video. Jayme is sent to attack Balthazar, but the latter manages to escape unnoticed and takes refuge in Cassiano's house. Faced with the scandal, Nestor forces Silvana to give an interview, claiming she lied. The next day, in front of the journalists, Nestor says that Silvana was coerced into making these accusations because of a kidnapping, blaming Balthazar for being the kidnapper. Silvana collapses and, in hospital, says she can't stand lying any longer and asks Nestor for a divorce, which he doesn't accept. Nestor gives an interview saying that Silvana has schizophrenia and that her condition worsened after the kidnapping, and that she will be hospitalized. Silvana calls Balthazar for help. Carolina meets with Nestor once again.
34	14	"Jayme 4"	May 2, 2024
After her meeting with Nestor in episode 10, Carolina asks Nestor to keep the affair a secret from Jayme. Jayme confronts Carolina when he learns that she is now a call girl and the woman argues with him. The next morning, reflecting on what happened to Nestor, Carolina is consoled by Kellen, who tells about her history in prostitution. Kellen tells that her real name is Arlete, and that she started prostituting herself when she was 18 to help pay off her family's debts. After her first night, Kellen says she felt dirty and shameful. Later, after arriving home from Sandra's funeral, Kellen tells Carolina that there is a new client asking for an appointment. Luara confronts Carolina for having "stolen" Nestor from her, who is her steady client. Carolina goes to the hotel and discovers that the new client is Jayme, the both argue and she leaves. The woman makes up with Kellen, who doesn't know the client's real identity, and argues with Luara about her threatening Carolina. Luara meets Jayme and tries to get close to him. Nestor talks to Jayme about the leaked video of Silvana and says he knows it was Balthazar who leaked it, and asks him to go and kill the boy. Later, as seen in the previous episode, Carolina shows up at Nestor's house and the two have sex, and the next morning, they are both confronted by Nestor's daughter, Maria Eduarda, who arrives on a trip to visit her mother Silvana.
35	15	"Geíza 4"	May 2, 2024
At the cemetery, after burying Sandra, Cassiano and Balthazar try to talk to Geíza, but she tells them to go away, as seen in episode 13. Devastated by her daughter's death, Geíza attempts suicide by taking too much tranquillizer and letting the gas in her house leak. Abílio shows up at Geíza's house to offer his condolences and saves the woman from death. Geíza comments that she hates Abílio and the man says that he also tried to kill himself after his wife's suicide. Abílio says that his wife killed herself when Renato was 8 years old, and that Renato found his mother dead after coming home from school, refusing to leave his mother's side when the firemen arrived at the house. Abílio says that he had to find the strength to go on living so as not to leave Renato alone. Abílio wants to help Geíza get revenge, and gives her the bullet lodged in the wall of his apartment, fired by Geíza in episode 11, so that there can be a comparison with the bullet that killed Sandra. In this way, she will prove that Nestor is the murderer. Geíza takes the bullet to Kellen and Darlan, where the latter contacts a friend in the police to investigate the case. Jayme finds out that they are starting to investigate Sandra's death and warns Nestor. Jayme breaks into Darlan and Kellen's house in search of answers, but is threatened at gunpoint by Darlan. Kellen suggests that Geíza run away to another town and she refuses. Nestor demands to know from Abílio who took the bullet for the investigation.
36	16	"Milena 4"	May 2, 2024
Jordana shows the security camera images to Egisto, who, suspicious, decides to investigate who the woman is who receives Milena's money. Egisto discovers Luara's real identity, her name is Ana Cristina da Silva, and tells Jordana that the woman is a call girl. Jordana is upset that Milena told her that the woman was a nurse cousin, who was going to help with Santana's supposed surgery. Egisto meets Luara to find out what her relationship is with Milena and Diuzinho, but the woman denies having known her late boyfriend and that Milena only lent her money. Egisto promises to give Luara more money in search of the truth. After being unmasked by Egisto, Milena confronts Luara about trying to ally herself with Egisto. Later, the both team up to get rid of Egisto. Luara meets Egisto in order to tell him the whole truth, while having sex with him near Brasília's Digital TV Tower, Milena arrives in hiding and sabotages Egisto's car. After doing so, Milena goes to a concert at Nandinho's street party and dedicates her performance to Jordana. Egisto has an accident and dies. Milena visits Jordana after Egisto's funeral and seduces her, having sex with her afterwards.
37	17	"Balthazar 5"	May 9, 2024
Maria Eduarda is taken by Nestor to the hospital where Silvana is being held. Silvana, still under the influence of sedatives, manages to talk into her daughter's ear to get her to look for Balthazar. Suspicious, Maria Eduarda starts looking for clues as to how her mother ended up in hospital. Nestor tells Jayme about Silvana's audios sent to Balthazar, and Jayme tells him that they need to lure Balthazar into a trap. Jayme discovers Larissa's cooperative and kidnaps the young woman. Nestor and Jayme force Larissa to call Balthazar and lure him to Canto do Bode. The girl communicates with her boyfriend but reveals that it's a trap. Balthazar goes to the restaurant and threatens Nestor saying that someone else will leak Silvana's audios asking for help if he and his girlfriend don't get out alive. Larissa asks to run away with Balthazar, but he says he can't stop to try help Silvana. Maria Eduarda goes by surprise to the hospital and manages to talk to her mother, who is not medicated, and Silvana tells her the whole truth. Maria Eduarda meets Balthazar and asks him to help her rescue her mother from the hospital. Later, she goes undercover as a nurse and manages to get her mother out of the room. At the entrance to the hospital, Cassiano and Balthazar wait for the women, who are caught by the security guards at the exit door. Nestor goes to the hospital and Maria Eduarda argues with him about wanting her mother out of the place, and the man lies saying that he will try to persuade the doctors to release Silvana more quickly. Nestor asks Jayme to help him find out who Maria Eduarda is contacting and Jayme's nephew Elias finds Cassiano's address. The next morning, Nestor shows up at Cassiano's apartment.
38	18	"Jayme 5"	May 9, 2024
Carolina tells Júlia that she has managed to pay the hospital bill with or part of the outstanding compensation from her old kiosks. The women plan to travel to Rio de Janeiro when Júlia gets better. Jayme demands that Kellen give him his money back for not having had sex with Carolina, as seen in episode 14, but Kellen won't give it back because he omitted his true identity. To get around the situation, Kellen offers Luara to spend a night with Jayme. During the date, Jayme asks Luara who Carolina's client is, and she reveals that it's Nestor. The next morning, Jayme goes to Carolina's apartment and says he knows the truth about her and Nestor. Carolina reveals that she would rather become a prostitute than lie with Jayme again. Without his niece knowing, Jayme records Carolina's words and goes to the hospital and shows the audio to Júlia, who takes ill and die. Carolina confronts Luara in front of Kellen about what she said to her uncle and makes Kellen dismiss Luara from the agency. After her mother's funeral, Carolina tells Kellen that she will pay her back before she leaves town. Nestor arrives to meet Carolina and offers to let her stay in an apartment, and he learns from her that Jayme knows about them. Nestor confronts Jayme, asking him to stay away from Carolina. Carolina discovers that Jayme visited Julia before she died, and accuses him of causing her mother's death.
39	19	"Geíza 5"	May 9, 2024
Geíza decides to go back to her old apartment, where she lived with Sandra in 2016. She finds Pascoal and another boy using drugs inside and threatens them with a knife. After being confronted by the boys, she manages to get around the situation and explain her story. Pascoal, who was Renato's friend, says he won't bother her. Abílio wants to help Geíza move out and shows regret and shame at his actions for always wanting to be the right man. He decides to help the woman put Nestor in jail for good. Abílio meets with Nestor and pretends to help him even more in his business, and that he will provide another CPF for the corrupt scheme. He takes photos of some files after Nestor leaves the office and then meets with Geíza to plan a raid on Nestor's house, take the politician's gun. When he hears from Nestor that he won't be home and that Maria Eduarda has moved out, Abílio goes with Geíza to the politician's home and turns off the security cameras so they can get in. Inside the mansion, they both search for the gun that killed Sandra, but are surprised by the arrival of Nestor and Carolina. Abílio and Geíza hide in the closet of Nestor's bedroom, while the latter has sex with Carolina. Geíza decides to film the couple having sex.
40	20	"Milena 5"	May 9, 2024
Jornada and Milena go to the police station and Chief Dumas reveals that the brake cable on Egisto's car was cut, causing the accident. Jordana is shocked by the information and deduces that her husband's death is possibly linked to the sales of slot machines. Luara moves into Milena's house and asks her to convince Jordana to hire her at the record company, threatening to tell her the whole truth if Milena doesn't succeed. In a conversation with Milena, Jordana suspects that Jayme was responsible for Egisto's death and later the two women go to meet him. Jayme claims to have no involvement in the accident and in return for Jordana selling him the slot machines, he will investigate who killed the man. Jordana takes Milena to see the farm where she was born, a large cotton producer. There, the women walk through the fields while Jordana tells her family's story. When they return home, the women are surprised by the presence of Dumas, who asks to speak to Jordana in private. Later, Jordana tells Milena that the police have found Egisto's cell phone and that it contains conversations with Luara. Luara was taken to the police station to give her statement, where she said that Egisto was only her client. Afterwards, Milena is threatened once again by Luara so that she can get her job at the record company, prompting Milena to go to Jordana and explain the situation. The two then think about the possibility of killing Luara so that she never tells Diuzinho's story
41	21	"Balthazar 6"	May 16, 2024
After being threatened by Nestor, Cassiano tells Balthazar about the politician's unexpected visit to his apartment, and is then consoled by João. The doctor responsible for Silvana's hospitalization shows Nestor and Maria Eduarda some satisfactory results, guaranteeing that the woman will leave the clinic in three weeks. Maria Eduarda doesn't quite believe the doctor's story and decides to meet up with Balthazar and Cassiano. While taking a car to meet the men, Maria Eduarda is followed by Elias, who is now determined to become a private detective. Maria Eduarda realizes that she is being followed and manages to lose Elias. She tells Balthazar and Cassiano that she plans to run away with her mother with some money from her savings account. Elias finds out that Cassiano and Balthazar know each other and tells Nestor, but charges him money to keep watching them. Maria Eduarda tells Nestor that she knows about Balthazar's case, but Nestor threatens to have Silvana hospitalized if her daughter doesn't stop meeting the boy. Nestor later talks to the doctor and says that he will take Silvana out of the clinic, but he intends to kill her so that she doesn't tell her whole story. When she sees the footage of the Canto do Bode robbery, Larissa recognizes that one of the robbers is her ex, Túlio, and confronts him, extremely angry and indignant. Túlio used the money from the robbery to found his motorcycle courier cooperative. Tulio meets Nestor offering to kill Balthazar, but asks him in return for a guarantee that he won't go to jail. Balthazar is then run over by Tulio.
42	22	"Jayme 6"	May 16, 2024
During a date night, Carolina asks Nestor to teach her how to shoot. He takes her to a vacant lot and teaches her. The next morning, Carolina manages to take Nestor's gun without him noticing and leaves with it. Elias tells Jayme that for him to win Carolina over, he needs to be more courteous. He suggests that his uncle partner up with Darlan to do some advertising with Bete for the pet shop. That way, Carolina would go to the recordings to help Darlan. Jayme goes to Kellen's agency and talks to her and Darlan about the partnership. Carolina doesn't mind helping with the recordings, which makes Kellen suspicious. Kellen discovers Nestor's gun in Carolina's apartment and confronts her, preventing her plan to kill Jayme. Kellen doesn't allow Carolina to go to the recordings, but when the day comes, he sees no choice but to allow her to go with Darlan. Carolina and Darlan witness Balthazar being run over and they be shocked. The filming with Bete goes well, and the next day Darlan takes ill and is unable to go to the pet shop. Carolina is allowed by Kellen to go alone and after the shoot, Jayme offers to take her home. Carolina is once again harassed by Jayme in the car, but she manages to get him injured by causing an accident in a tunnel. Carolina manages to get out of the car because she was wearing a seatbelt, and takes Bete with her, leaving Jayme unconscious.
43	23	"Geíza 6"	May 16, 2024
As seen in the final scenes of episode 19, Geíza continues to film Nestor and Carolina having sex until Maria Eduarda arrives in the bedroom and interrupts them. An argument ensues and as soon as everyone leaves the room, Geíza and Abílio leave. Later, Abílio tells Nestor that he is going to hand over his CPF number and join the new corruption scheme, surprising Nestor who asks him to take copies of the documents. In the evening, Abílio tells Geíza about his plan to sign the documents and show them to the press. He also declares that he is in love with Geíza and the both kiss. The next morning, Geíza does Kellen's nails and gets emotional talking about Sandra. Kellen decides to give the gun he took from Carolina so that Geíza can take it for a ballistics test. On her way home on the bus, Geíza sees Balthazar being run over, but doesn't recognize him and is shocked by what has happened. Later, she and Abílio go to a women's police station where Geíza tells her story and shows the gun to an inspector. The inspector says she can't help her because the case is in Dumas' department, but she calls the press. In front of the journalists, Geíza accuses Nestor of killing her daughter, shows them the gun and the documents of the new scheme, and demands justice. Dumas, pressured by the Public Prosecutor's Office, decides to arrest Nestor and denies any bribery by the politician. Geíza and Abílio start a relationship, but when Nestor is released on bail, he sends Jayme to put drugs in Abílio's apartment to get revenge. Abílio is then arrested for this.
44	24	"Milena 6"	May 16, 2024
To keep Luara close, Jordana decides to hire her as Milena's assistant at her record label, and gives her a car and an apartment to convince her to keep the secret about Diuzinho. In the evening, Luara meets Jayme and tells him that she is no longer a prostitute, but they can continue to meet casually. The next morning, Luara is on the production team for Milena's music video with the Barões da Pisadinha. She takes some photos of the singer with Jordana before filming is interrupted by Balthazar being hit by a car. Later, Milena visits her mother Silvana and they end up arguing about the singer spending too much time with Jordana. Milena goes to Jornada's house and Jornada asks her to live with her. After Milena rehearses once again in the studio with the Barões da Pisadinha, Luara takes some photos of the singer with Jordana, making Jordana totally suspicious of the woman. Jordana then decides to have Luara killed, believing that she might harm her at some point. An armed biker chases Luara in her car and misses the shot, causing the woman to confront Milena and Jordana about it, where the latter denies any involvement. Luara goes to Jayme's pet shop and finds him with a head wound from the accident in episode 22. She tells him what happened and takes him to her apartment to show him a red jacket, which hides copies of Diuzinho's documents in the lining. Luara asks Jayme to disclose the documents in case she is killed. Jordana doesn't give up her desire to kill Luara, and goes to the woman's apartment with Milena. The women go through the place to set up a robbery scene, and when Luara arrives, Jordana shoots her dead.
45	25	"Balthazar 7"	May 23, 2024
A motorcycle courier saw who ran over Balthazar and informs another colleague, Fernando. Fernando goes to the hospital and tells Larissa that the culprit is Tulio. Larissa mobilizes all the delivery motorcycle courier to look for Túlio. Balthazar has a respiratory arrest and almost dies, but is revived after having a vision of his grandmother Regina. Túlio asks Nestor for help, is ignored by him and is then captured by the motorcycle couriers. Túlio is arrested and tells Nestor of his involvement in the hit-and-run, Jayme finds out and informs Nestor. The politician asks Jayme to persuade Túlio to give another version in his statement: that he stole the car from Nestor's dealership and that he involved the politician's name out of desperation. A few days later, Balthazar is released from hospital and finally receives compensation from the state for having been unjustly imprisoned and sentenced. Silvana also leaves the clinic, and is subjected to pretending to have a happy life with her family for Nestor's social medias. Balthazar and Larissa get married and this has repercussions on social media, where the local newspaper publishes an article saying: "Deliverers organize wedding and go viral". Balthazar and Larissa finally leave Ceilândia.
46	26	"Jayme 7"	May 23, 2024
After the accident, Carolina goes to Kellen's agency and tells Darlan what has happened and that Bete is missing. Darlan is distraught at the disappearance of his dog and goes to Jayme's pet shop to confront him, believing that he is responsible for Bete's disappearance. Jayme denies having the dog and that when he woke up in the car, Bete's crate was open and she wasn't there. The next morning, Darlan spreads posters offering a R$10,000 reward for anyone who finds the dog. Carolina takes photos of Bete smeared with red paint to represent blood, and sends the photos to Darlan at an unknown number in order to annoy the man even more. Gabriel visits Carolina and she tells him how frustrated she is with herself after all the recent events. Darlan starts to get more paranoid about believing that Jayme is with Bete to get revenge for the confrontation Kellen had with Nestor. Kellen and Darlan fight. Carolina visits Jayme at the pet shop to say she's leaving Ceilândia and goes to the bathroom to leave Bete hidden. She goes to tell Darlan where the dog is, and together with him and Kellen, Carolina goes back to the pet shop and witnesses Darlan shoot Jayme after rescuing Bete. Darlan and Kellen run away and Carolina watches Jayme die. Gabriel tells Carolina that the compensation for the kiosks has come through and they have sex. The next day, the local newspaper publishes four stories, one of which says: "Businessman, already in prison for rape, is murdered because of an influence dog". Kellen discovers that Carolina set her and her husband up. Carolina finally leaves Ceilândia.
47	27	"Geíza 7"	May 23, 2024
Geíza visits Abílio in prison and tells him that he could be imprisoned for five years, but assures him that she will find a lawyer for him. He shows concern for her because Nestor might find her in her old apartment. Geíza meets with Kellen and vents about everything that is happening. Kellen suggests that she find another way to get Abílio out of prison without paying a lawyer. Geíza makes a deal with Pascoal, who has contacts in prison to help Abílio escape. In exchange, Geíza will give Pascoal her apartment. Geíza tells Abílio about the escape and asks him to prepare when the time comes. Silvana goes with Maria Eduarda to the latter's apartment and asks her daughter to flee for her safety, but Maria Eduarda asks them to support Nestor, leaving Silvana confused. Via text message, Maria Eduarda tells her mother that the apartment has cameras. Nestor meets with Abílio to try to persuade him, but Abílio says he will tell him the whole truth about the corruption scheme. Nestor asks Jayme to contact a prison inmate and kill Abílio and meet with the drug dealers of Sol Nascente. Jayme offers Pascoal money to make him kill Geíza. Pascoal won't do it and lets the woman escape from the community because of the affinity he has built up with her. Geíza takes refuge in Kellen's house. Silvana gives Maria Eduarda money to escape and later kills Nestor while he rapes her. The next day, the local newspaper publishes four stories, one of which says: "Nestor Rebouças is murdered by his wife who was in hospital". Abílio escapes from prison and leaves Ceilândia with Geíza.
48	28	"Milena 7"	May 23, 2024
After killing Luara, Jordana and Milena get rid of the gun. Jayme arrives at Luara's apartment and finds her dead, he looks for the red jacket but can't find it. Jordana and Milena get the jacket and recover the last copies of Diuzinho's documents. Jordana burns the copies. The next morning, Jordana takes Milena and Santana to a billboard where there is a picture of the singer with a date set for a concert. The women are delighted. Jayme talks to Dumas about releasing Luara's statement about her relationship with Egisto, and talks about the coincidences between the ex-prostitute, the singer and the businesswoman. Jayme goes to the place where Luara last met Egisto, and discovers a packet of the woman's favorite cookies and a bracelet from Milena. Before Milena's concert, Jayme gives Jordana what he's found and asks her to draw her own conclusions (after that, Jayme is murdered in episode 26). Jordana shows Milena what she has received, but Milena denies any involvement in Egisto's death and declares her love for Jordana. Milena's concert is a success and the local newspaper publishes a story saying: "Jordana Juarez makes another star, meet Milena, the new voice of the piseiro". Finally, Jordana decides to travel with Milena and they both enjoy a sunset on a beach.
