= Aderbal Freire Filho =

Brazilian actor (1941–2023)

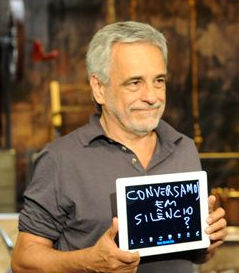
- Aderbal in 2014
- Born: 8 May 1941; Fortaleza, Ceará, Brazil
- Died: 9 August 2023 (aged 82); Rio de Janeiro, Brazil
- Occupations: Actor, director
- Years active: 1954–20??
- Spouse: Marieta Severo (m. 2004)

Aderbal Freire Filho (8 May 1941 – 9 August 2023) was a Brazilian actor, theatrical director and television presenter.

== Biography ==
Aderbal Freire Filho was born in Fortaleza, Ceará. He graduated in law. Since 2004, he had established a stable relationship with actress Marieta Severo. He died in Rio de Janeiro on 9 August 2023, at the age of 82.

== Filmography ==
=== Television ===
Year	Title	Role	TV channel
1994	Confissões de Adolescente	Professor Erculano (Ep. O Que Eu Vou Ser Quando Crescer)	TV Cultura
2014	Dupla Identidade	Senator Otto Veiga	Rede Globo
2015	Tapas & Beijos	Norberto (Special participation)	Rede Globo

TV Presenter
Year	Title	Occupation	TV Channel
2012-20??	Arte do Artista	Presenter	TV Brasil

=== Theater ===
- 1972 – O Cordão Umbilical, de Mario Prata.
- 1973 – Apareceu a Margarida, de Roberto Athayde.
- 1974 – Um Visitante do Alto, de Roberto Athayde.
- 1974 – Manual de Sobrevivência na Selva, de Roberto Athayde.
- 1974 – Pequeno Dicionário da Língua Feminina, de Flávio Márcio.
- 1974 – Reveillon, de Flávio Márcio.
- 1975 – Corpo a Corpo, Corpo a Corpo, de Oduvaldo Vianna Filho.
- 1975 – O Vôo dos Pássaros Selvagens, de Aldomar Conrado.
- 1977 – A Morte de Danton, de Georg Büchner.
- 1978 – Em Algum Lugar Fora Deste Mundo, de José Wilker.
- 1979 – Crimes Delicados, de José Antônio de Souza (em Buenos Aires).
- 1980 – O Desembestado, de Ariovaldo Mattos.
- 1980 – Dom Quixote de la Pança, adaptação da novela de Cervantes.
- 1981 – Moço em Estado de Sítio, de Oduvaldo Vianna Filho.
- 1983 – Besame Mucho, de Mario Prata.
- 1984 – Mão na Luva, de Oduvaldo Vianna Filho.
- 1985 – Mefisto, de Klaus Mann (em Montevidéu, com o elenco oficial da Comedia Nacional de Uruguay).
- 1987 – Egor Bulichov y otros, de Máximo Gorki (com Teatro El Galpón, de Montevidéu).
- 1988 – Simon Boccanera, de Giuseppe Verdi (em Montevidéu).
- 1989 – Soroco, Sua Mãe, Sua Filha, adaptado de Guimarães Rosa (in the Netherlands, with the Teatro Munganga of Amsterdam).
- 1990 – A Mulher Carioca aos 22 Anos.
- 1991 – Lampião, de Aderbal Freire Filho.
- 1991 – O Tiro Que Mudou a História, de Aderbal Freire Filho e Carlos Eduardo Novaes.
- 1992 – Tiradentes, Inconfidência no Rio, de Aderbal Freire Filho e Carlos Eduardo Novaes.
- 1994 – Senhora dos Afogados, de Nelson Rodrigues.
- 1995 – Lima Barreto, ao Terceiro Dia, de Luis Alberto de Abreu.
- 1995 – Kean, adaptação de Jean-Paul Sartre da obra de Alexandre Dumas.
- 1996 – No Verão de 1996, a partir dos quadros de Rubens Gerchman.
- 1997 – O Carteiro e O Poeta, de Antonio Skármeta.
- 1999 – Luces de Bohemia, de Ramón del Valle Inclán (com El Galpón, de Montevidéu).
- 2001 – Casa de Bonecas, de Henrik Ibsen.
- 2002 – Sylvia, adaptação de Flávio Marinho para o texto de A. Gurney.
- 2002 – A Prova, de David Auburn.
- 2003 – Cão Coisa e a Coisa Homem, de Aderbal Freire Filho.
- 2003 – Tio Vânia, de Anton Chekhov.
- 2003 – A Peça sobre o Bebê, de Edward Albee.
- 2003 – O que diz Molero, de Dinis Machado.
- 2005 – Sonata de Outono, versão para teatro de Ingmar Bergman.
- 2006 – O Púcaro Búlgaro, baseado em textos de Campos de Carvalho.
- 2007 – O Continente Negro, de Marco Antônio De La Parra.
- 2007 – As Centernárias, de Newton Moreno.
- 2008 – A Ordem do Mundo, de Patrícia Melo.
- 2008 – Hamlet, de William Shakespeare.
- 2009 – Moby Dick, adaptação do romance de Herman Melville.
- 2010 – Macbeth, de William Shakespeare.
- 2010 – Orfeu, de Vinicius de Moraes.
- 2011 – Linda, de Gillray Coutinho.
- 2011 – Na selva das cidades, de Bertolt Brecht.
- 2011 – Depois do Filme, de Aderbal Freire Filho.

=== Film ===
- 2008 – Juventude, by Domingos de Oliveira.
- 2012 – Paixão e Acaso, by Domingos de Oliveira.
