= Nada Será Como Antes =

- Also known as: Nothing Remains the Same
- Genre: Drama
- Created by: Guel Arraes; Jorge Furtado
- Directed by: Luisa Lima; Isabella Teixeira
- Starring: Murilo Benício; Débora Falabella; Bruna Marquezine; Letícia Colin; Daniel de Oliveira; Osmar Prado; Cássia Kis Magro
- Opening theme: "Try a Little Tenderness", Cássia Eller
- Country of origin: Brazil
- Original language: Portuguese
- No. of seasons: 1
- No. of episodes: 12

Production
- Running time: 60 minutes

Original release
- Network: Rede Globo
- Release: 27 September – 20 December 2016

Nada Será Como Antes (English: Nothing Remains the Same) is a 2016 Brazilian television series created by Guel Arraes and Jorge Furtado. It was produced and aired by Rede Globo.

== Plot ==
In 10 episodes, the miniseries tells the love story lived by Saulo (Murilo Benício) and Verônica (Debora Falabella), with the implementation of the first TV network in Brazil as a backdrop. In the series, Saulo is a visionary and passionate man, who dreams of creating the first television network alongside Verônica, who aspires to be a famous actress. Set in the mid-1950s, the series features the drama and conflicts experienced by the couple, as well as the revolution and innovation that marked the early days of television as we know it today.

== Cast ==
- Murilo Benício ... Saulo Ribeiro
- Débora Falabella ... Verônica Maia
- Bruna Marquezine ... Beatriz de Souza
- Letícia Colin ... Júlia Azevedo Gomes
- Daniel de Oliveira ... Otaviano Azevedo Gomes
- Fabrício Boliveira ... Péricles Gonçalves
- Bruno Garcia ... Aristides
- Alejandro Claveaux ... Rodolfo do Vale
- Cássia Kiss ... Odete de Souza
- Osmar Prado ... Pompeu Azevedo Gomes
- Igor Angelkorte ... Vitor
