= Chocolate com Pimenta =

Brazilian telenovela by Walcyr Carrasco

- Also known as: Pepper Chocolate
- Genre: Telenovela; Romantic comedy
- Created by: Walcyr Carrasco
- Based on: The Merry Widow
- Directed by: Jorge Fernando
- Starring: Mariana Ximenes; Murilo Benício; Elizabeth Savalla; Priscila Fantin; Fúlvio Stefanini; Ary Fontoura; Marcello Novaes; Drica Moraes; Tarcísio Filho; Lília Cabral; Laura Cardoso; Osmar Prado see more
- Opening theme: "Chocolate com Pimenta" by Deborah Blando
- Ending theme: "Chocolate com Pimenta" by Deborah Blando
- Country of origin: Brazil
- Original language: Portuguese
- No. of episodes: 209

Production
- Production location: Brazil
- Running time: 30–40 minutes
- Production company: Central Globo de Produção

Original release
- Network: Rede Globo
- Release: 8 September 2003 – 7 May 2004

Chocolate com Pimenta (English title: Pepper Chocolate) is a Brazilian telenovela, set in the 1920s, starring Mariana Ximenes and Murilo Benício. It was produced and broadcast by Rede Globo in 2003 and 2004. It was written by Walcyr Carrasco and directed by Jorge Fernando.

== Synopsis ==
The story of Ana Francisca (Mariana Ximenes), who at the start of the soap opera is a poor, yet kind, young girl. Aninha, as she is lovingly called by those closest to her, suffered the loss of her father and was forced to flee to the city of Ventura, after being left destitute.

Once in Ventura, she begins to live with her uncle Margarido (Osmar Prado), her grandmother Carmen (Laura Cardoso), cousins Márcia (Drica Moraes) and Timóteo (Marcelo Novaes) and an adopted family member, Dália (Carla Daniel) on their small farm.

Although without means, Ana wishes to study and pursue a teaching career, which she is able to do thanks to the help of the Mother Superior, who grants her a scholarship at the local school. She is instantly unpopular at school because she is poor and is hated by Olga (Priscila Fantin). Aninha begins to like Danilo (Murilo Benício), the Mayor's nephew, known in town for being a ladies man. However, Olga quickly realizes Ana's feelings and tries to keep Danilo from the girl, as she wants him to herself.

Meanwhile, Aninha begins to work at the city's chocolate factory. The factory, considered to be the city's economical centre, raises the price of the land and generates money by creating jobs, giving the city a great deal of social status within the region. One day, while working, Ana stumbled upon a man she believed to be just another worker at the factory and befriends him, all without knowing that he is in fact the owner of the chocolate factory, Ludovico Canto e Melo.

Slowly, Danilo begins to know Aninha's kind and pure heart and they fall in love with one another, eventually spending the night together. Shortly afterwards, Ana discovers she is pregnant with his child and tells his aunt, Bárbara (Lília Cabral). Bárbara despises Ana, as she believes Aninha to be unfit for her nephew due to her low social status, preferring for Danilo to be with Olga. However, pretends to like the girl and deceives her by promising to tell Danilo about the child, so that Ana may tell her family as well.

Ana believes Danilo knows about the child and happily gets ready for her graduation ceremony, where she is to meet him. Nonetheless, at the ceremony, when Ana is set to receive her diploma, green paint is dropped on her head and everyone laughs at her. This was planned by Danilo's aunt Bárbara and Olga, who wished to separate the young couple.

Humiliated, Ana runs away believing Danilo ordered the paint to be dropped on her, but runs into her friend Ludovico, that now reveals his identity. As they talk, she tells him of her pregnancy and of the shame she feels. Ludovico, deeply touched by Ana's selflessness for having helped him, offers to marry her so that she can avoid the shame of having a son out of wedlock, which at the time was severely frowned upon. Although at first suspicious, Ana agrees for Ludovico assures her that does it all out friendship. Before marrying, Ana vows revenge on those who harmed and humiliated her.

Ana and Ludovico promptly leave for Argentina, where she has her child, Tonico and learns to be a Lady of high society. Seven years pass and her husband succumbs to his illness, leaving her a large inheritance and the chocolate factory. Ana decides it is time to return to Ventura and make due to her promise of revenge.

Upon her return and throughout the rest of the story, Ana Francisca will be at odds with the 4 most influential people in the city - the Mayor, the Banker, the Chief of Police and her late husband's sister - who wish to control the chocolate factory for their own purposes and will try to ruins Ana's life by creating misunderstandings and false assumptions.

On the side lines, the story will also follow the population of Ventura and the comical situations they find themselves on a daily basis.

== Cast ==
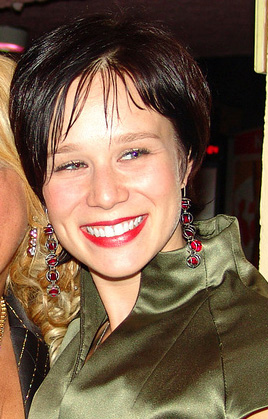
Mariana Ximenes as Ana Francisca.

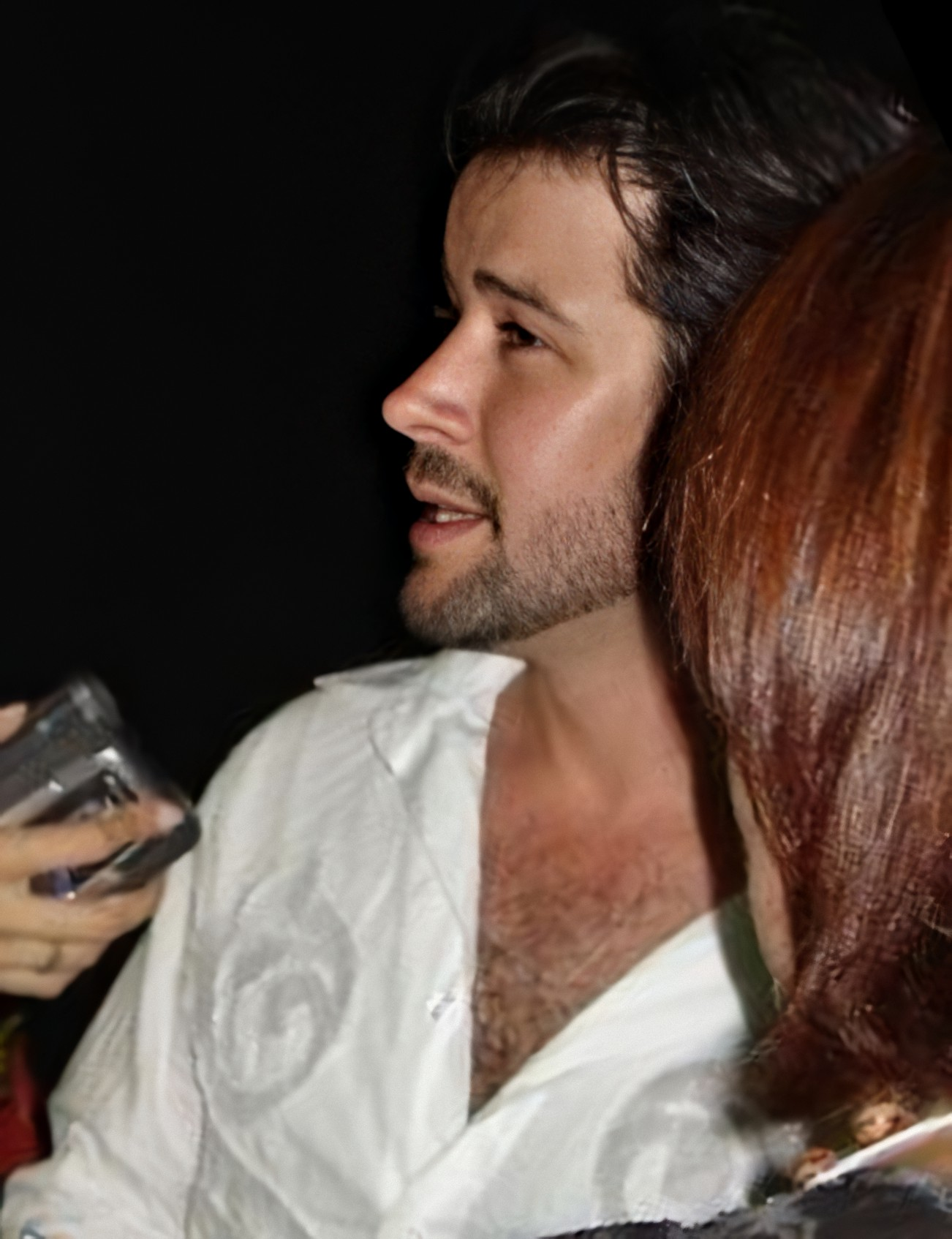
Murilo Benício as Danilo.

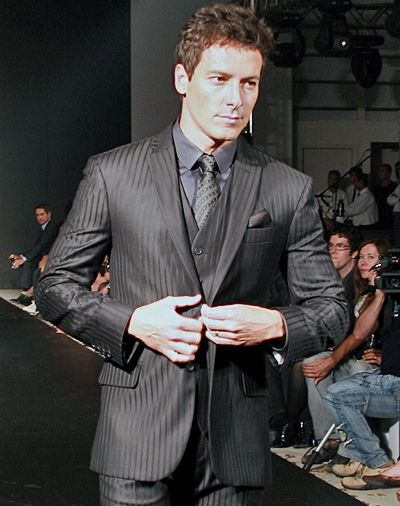
Rodrigo Faro as Guilherme.

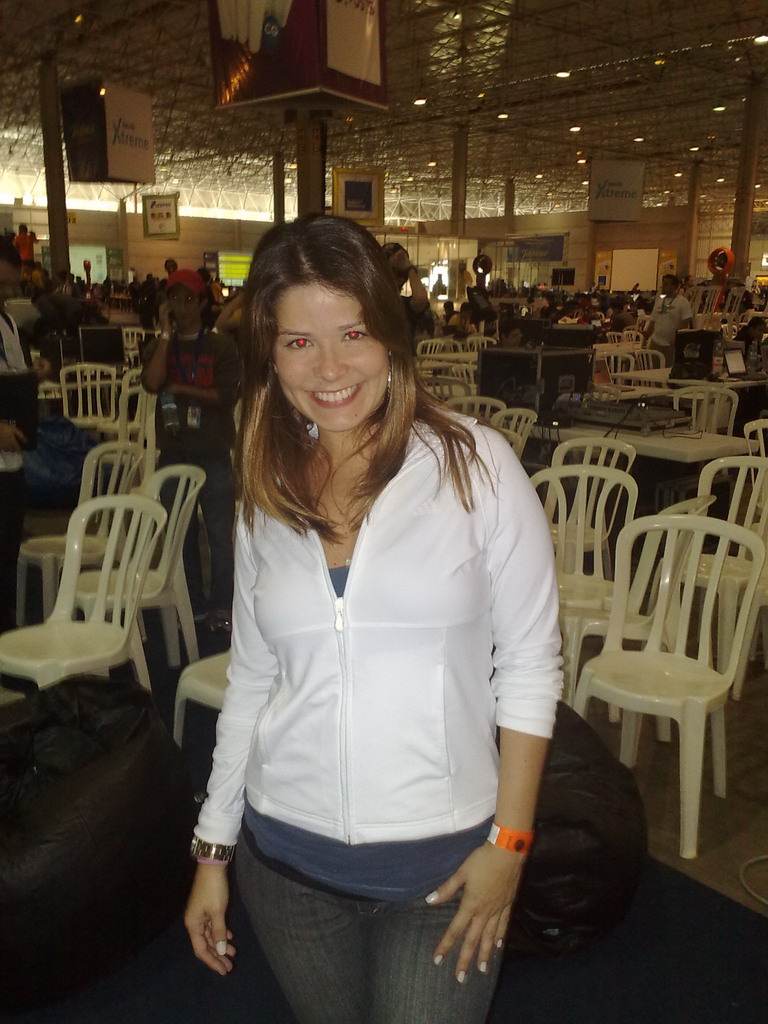
Samara Felippo as Celina.

Actor	Character
Mariana Ximenes	Aninha (Ana Francisca Mariano da Silva Canto e Melo Albuquerque)
Murilo Benício	Danilo Rodrigues Albuquerque
Priscila Fantin	Olga Gonçalves Lima Peixoto
Elizabeth Savalla	Jezebel Canto e Mello
Drica Moraes	Márcia Mariano da Silva
Marcello Novaes	Timóteo Mariano da Silva
Samara Felippo	Celina Costa Andrade Fernandes
Nívea Stelmann	Graça (Maria da Graça Costa Andrade Fernandes)
Rodrigo Faro	Guilherme Oliveira Fernandes
Lília Cabral	Bárbara Albuquerque
Fúlvio Stefanini	Prefeito Vivaldo Albuquerque
Ângelo Paes Leme	Soldado Peixoto (José Rufino Peixoto)
Tarcísio Filho	Sebastian Von Burgo
Laura Cardoso	Carmem da Silva
Rosamaria Murtinho	Margot Oliveira Fernandes
Osmar Prado	Margarido da Silva
Cláudio Corrêa e Castro	Conde Klaus Von Burgo
Kayky Brito	Bernadete (Bernardo Canto e Mello)
Ary Fontoura	Ludovico Canto e Melo
Caco Ciocler	Miguel Torres
Denise Del Vecchio	Dona Mocinha Limeira da Silva
Antônio Grassi	Reginaldo Andrade
Ary França	Epaminondas
Ernani Moraes	Delegado Terêncio Lima
Rosane Gofman	Roseli Castro Fritz
Guilherme Piva	Dr. Paulo Bentes
Tânia Bondezan	Marieta Gonçalves Lima
Carla Daniel	Dália Silva
Maria Maya	Lili (Liliane) Campos Soares
Luíza Curvo	Cássia Gonçalves Lima
Patrícia França	Drª. Sofia Menezes
Guilherme Vieira	Antonio(Tonico) da Silva Canto e Melo
Alexandre Barillari	Beto (Alberto Lares)
Josie Pessoa	Camilla
Mônica Carvalho	Gigi
Renato Rabello	Padre Eurico Seriano
Ricardo Martins	Quincas (Joaquim)
Juliana Alves	Selma Cardoso de Almeida
Sabrina Rosa	Vera Cardoso de Almeida
Victor Pecoraro	Maurício Von Burgo
Andréa Avancini	Yvete
Hilda Rebello	Matilde
Marcelo Barros	Araújo
Yeda Dantas	Cândida
Viviane Porto	Inácia
Cacá Bueno	Elias
Jean Felipe	Palito
Luís Antonio Nascimento	Jóia
Marcela Barrozo	Estelinha (Estela Albuquerque)
Sabrina de Souza	Darlene
Samuel Mello	Beleza

== Soundtrack ==
=== National ===
Cover: Mariana Ximenes

1. "Além do Arco-Íris" - Luiza Possi
2. "Tristeza do Jeca" - Zezé Di Camargo & Luciano
3. "Sensação (Baby Face)" - KLB
4. "Encontro" - Fábio Nestares
5. "Toda Vez que Eu Digo Adeus (Every Time We Say Goodbye)" - Cássia Eller
6. "Voa Bicho" - Milton Nascimento
7. "Pra Lembrar de Nós" - Flávio Venturini
8. "Tá-Hi (Pra Você Gostar de Mim)" - Eduardo Dusek
9. "Urubu Malandro" - Abraçando Jacaré
10. "Sensível Demais" - Nalanda
11. "Valsa Brasileira" - Luiz Melodia
12. "De Um Jeito que não Sai" - Leila Pinheiro
13. "Apanhei-te Mini Moog" - Mu Carvalho
14. "Chocolate Com Pimenta" - Deborah Blando

=== International ===
Cover: Murilo Benício

1. "I'm In The Mood For Love" - Rod Stewart
2. "Every Time We Say Goodbye" - Steve Tyrell
3. "Hey There" - Bette Midler
4. "(Somewhere) Over The Rainbow" - Luiza Possi
5. "In The Mood" - Glenn Miller
6. "Puttin' On The Ritz" - Fred Astaire
7. "Night And Day" - Ella Fitzgerald
8. "Mack The Knife (Moritait)"- Louis Armstrong
9. "Stormy Weather (Keeps Rainin' All The Time)" - Etta James
10. "Lover" - John Williams & The Boston Pops
11. "Chocolate Waltz" - The John Windsor Company
12. "Good Old Times" - Swinging Jellys
13. "Curly Little Girl" - Charlie Robins Band

Preceded by Agora É que São Elas; 24 March 2003–6 September 2003	Globo 6 p.m. timeslot telenovela 8 September 2003–7 May 2004	Succeeded by Cabocla; 10 May 2004–19 November 2004
