= Nuria Mallena =

Brazilian singer, composer and writer (born 1978)

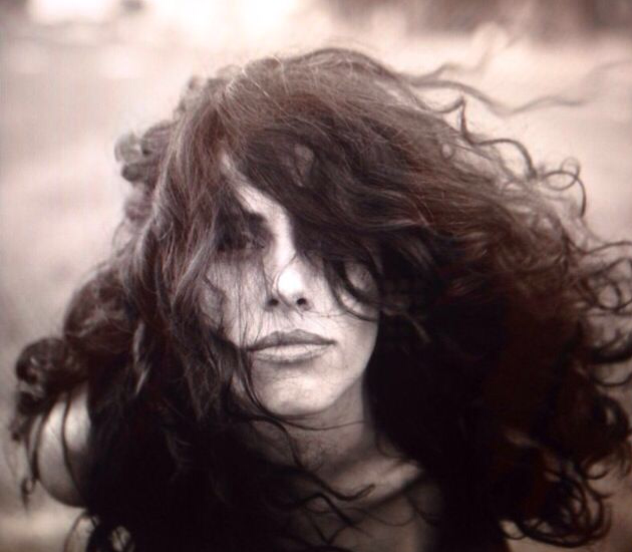
- Nuria Mallena in 2014.

Background information
- Born: Nuria Mallena Saraiva do Amaral; July 10, 1978 (age 48); Ouricuri, Brazil
- Genres: Música popular brasileira
- Occupations: Singer, composer
- Instruments: voice, guitar,
- Years active: 1988–present
- Labels: Universal; Sony; Som Livre
- Website: nuriamallena.com

Nuria Mallena (born July 10, 1978) is a Brazilian singer, composer and writer.

== Career ==
Nuria Mallena is a Brazilian singer and composer, born in Ouricuri, a small village in the backwoods of Pernambuco, northeastern Brazil. She starts playing the acoustic guitar, singing and composing by the age of 10. As of 15 years-old she starts performing in music festivals throughout the Northeast Region. A few years later she moves to Rio de Janeiro, where she enrolls in several music projects and partnerships, with which she travels around the country.

She has two songs recorded for telenovelas and miniseries soundtracks from Rede Globo: "Quando Assim", in Cordel Encantado, 2011, and "Oração", in Justiça, 2016. Also for Rede Globo, she participates in some music shows such as Programa Som Brasil and Jovens Tardes, playing songs of her own and others’.

In 2012 she records her first album, Nu, with the seal Malagueta and Biscoito Fino, and in 2014 she releases her second album, Nuria Mallena, produced by Álvaro Alencar and Christiaan Oyens.

In 2015 she moves to Lisbon, Portugal, and two years later she composes "Ouro Verde" for the soundtrack of the Portuguese telenovela Ouro Verde, the Emmy winner from TVI channel. Still in Lisbon, she releases her first book of short stories, called "Poeira de Areia" (2017).

== Discography ==
=== 2011: Cordel Encantado (soundtrack) ===
3. Quando assim (Nuria Mallena)

=== 2012: Nu ===
1. Quando assim (Nuria Mallena)
2. Na beira (Nuria Mallena)
3. Cheiro de chuva (Nuria Mallena)
4. Tocar você (Nuria Mallena)
5. Meu sim (Nuria Mallena)
6. Zé (Nuria Mallena)
7. Solo em companhia (Nuria Mallena, Daniel Chaudon)
8. Pra quê (Nuria Mallena, Luís Kiari, Naná Karabachian)
9. Sem hora (Nuria Mallena, Naná Karabachian, Daniel Chaudon)
10. Da porta (Nuria Mallena, Luís Kiari)
11. Meu chão (Nuria Mallena)
12. Quando assim (Nuria Mallena)

=== 2014: Nuria Mallena ===
1. A Louca e a Bicicleta (Nuria Mallena)
2. Provocar (Nuria Mallena)
3. Escolha (Nuria Mallena)
4. Cheiro de Chuva (Nuria Mallena)
5. Assim (Nuria Mallena)
6. Escuso (Nuria Mallena)
7. Esse Tanto (Nuria Mallena, Fernanda Dias)
8. Da Porta (Nuria Mallena, Luís Kiari)
9. Saia (Nuria Mallena)
10. Vem (Nuria Mallena, Christiaan Oyens)
11. Oração (Nuria Mallena)

=== 2014: Jovens Tardes (soundtrack) ===
8. Escolha (Nuria Mallena)
18. Tempo Perdido (Renato Russo)

=== 2017: Ouro Verde (soundtrack) ===
20. Ouro Verde (Nuria Mallena)
