= Angel Ferreira =

Brazilian actor, author and director

- Born: Igor Angelkorte; August 10, 1983 (age 43); Rio de Janeiro, Brazil
- Occupation: Actor
- Years active: 2008–present

Angel Ferreira (born August 10, 1983), formerly known by his birth name Igor Angelkorte, is a Brazilian actor, author and director.

== Career ==
He graduated in theater and made his television debut in Rede Globo telenovela Além do Horizonte, screened in 2014. Before that, he had only made a brief participation in Araguaia. In 2015, he got a part in the telenovela Babilônia, in prime time on TV Globo, after making a participation in the series Dupla Identidade. He is formed by Casa das Artes de Laranjeiras.

In 2024, Angelkorte changed his stage name to Angel Ferreira.

== Filmography ==
=== Television ===
Year	Title	Role
2010	Araguaia	Caio
2013	Além do Horizonte	Marcelo Vilar
2014	Dupla Identidade	Ivan
2015	Babilônia	Clóvis Bevilaquia
2016	Justiça	Marcelo
2016	Nada Será Como Antes	Vitor
2016	Segredos de Justiça	Túlio
2017–18	O Outro Lado do Paraíso	Rafael
2023	Terra e Paixão	Dr. Henrique Sampaio

=== Film ===
Year	Title	Role
2010	Subitamente V (curta-metragem)	—N/a
—N/a	Atrás de uma bola (curta-metragem)	—N/a
2011	E-Love (curta-metragem)	Rubinho
2013	Através do Espelho (curta-metragem)	—N/a

=== Stage ===
Year	Title
2008	Os Melhores Anos de Nossas Vidas
2009	Peer Gynt
2009	Sweeney Todd
2009	O Casamento
2010	Da Carta ao Pai
2010	Do Artista quando Jovem
2012	Antes que você me toque
2011–13	(Des)conhecidos
2013	Elefante
2015	Os Ordinários
2016	Os Sonhadores
