= The Man of the Year (2003 film) =

2003 film directed by José Henrique Fonseca

- Theatrical release poster
- Directed by: José Henrique Fonseca
- Screenplay by: Rubem Fonseca
- Based on: The Killer by Patrícia Melo
- Produced by: Jose Henrique Fonseca
- Starring: Murilo Benício; Cláudia Abreu; Natália Lage
- Cinematography: Breno Silveira
- Edited by: Sergio Mekler
- Music by: Dado Villa-Lobos
- Distributed by: Warner Bros. Pictures
- Release date: August 1, 2003
- Running time: 113 minutes
- Country: Brazil
- Language: Portuguese

The Man of the Year (Portuguese: O Homem do Ano), is a 2003 Brazilian drama film produced and directed by José Henrique Fonseca. It stars Murilo Benício, Cláudia Abreu, and Natália Lage.

== Plot ==
Maiquel (Murilo Benício) is a single, ordinary man living in the Baixada Fluminense region of Rio de Janeiro. After losing a soccer bet to his friends, Maiquel must dye his hair blond. This unusual event in his otherwise mundane life inspires Maiquel to ask his hairdresser, Cledir (Cláudia Abreu) out to a bar where he is confronted and bullied by a local criminal named Suel (Wagner Moura). He decides to settle the matter by subsequently buying a rifle which he uses to shoot and kill Suel the next day. He does so in front of Suel's girlfriend. Instead of reprimanding Maiquel, everyone in the neighborhood, including the police, is overjoyed that he has killed off this local pest and shows their gratitude with gifts. With the news of Maiquel's rise to heroism, influential locals hire him to kill others for him, turning him into a full-on hitman. Maiquel's once dull life becomes one filled with drugs, sex, wealth, and violence as he gradually becomes detached from his wife and becomes less of the "ordinary man" he once was. This path of destruction leads Maiquel to become an outlaw on the run. The film ends with Maiquel dying his hair black and running from the police, realizing just how much his life has changed.

== Cast ==
- Murilo Benício as Máiquel
- Cláudia Abreu as Cledir
- Natália Lage as Érica
- Jorge Dória as Dr. Carvalho
- Marcelo Biju as Neno
- André Gonçalves as Galego
- Lázaro Ramos as Marcão
- Perfeito Fortuna as Robinson
- Paulinho Moska as Enoque
- Wagner Moura as Suel
- André Barros as Marlênio
- Carlo Mossy as delegado Santana
- Mariana Ximenes as Gabriela
- Amir Haddad as Gonzaga
- José Wilker as Sílvio
- Agildo Ribeiro as Zilmar
