= Mercado de São José =

Saint Joseph's Market
- Mercado de São José (Portuguese)
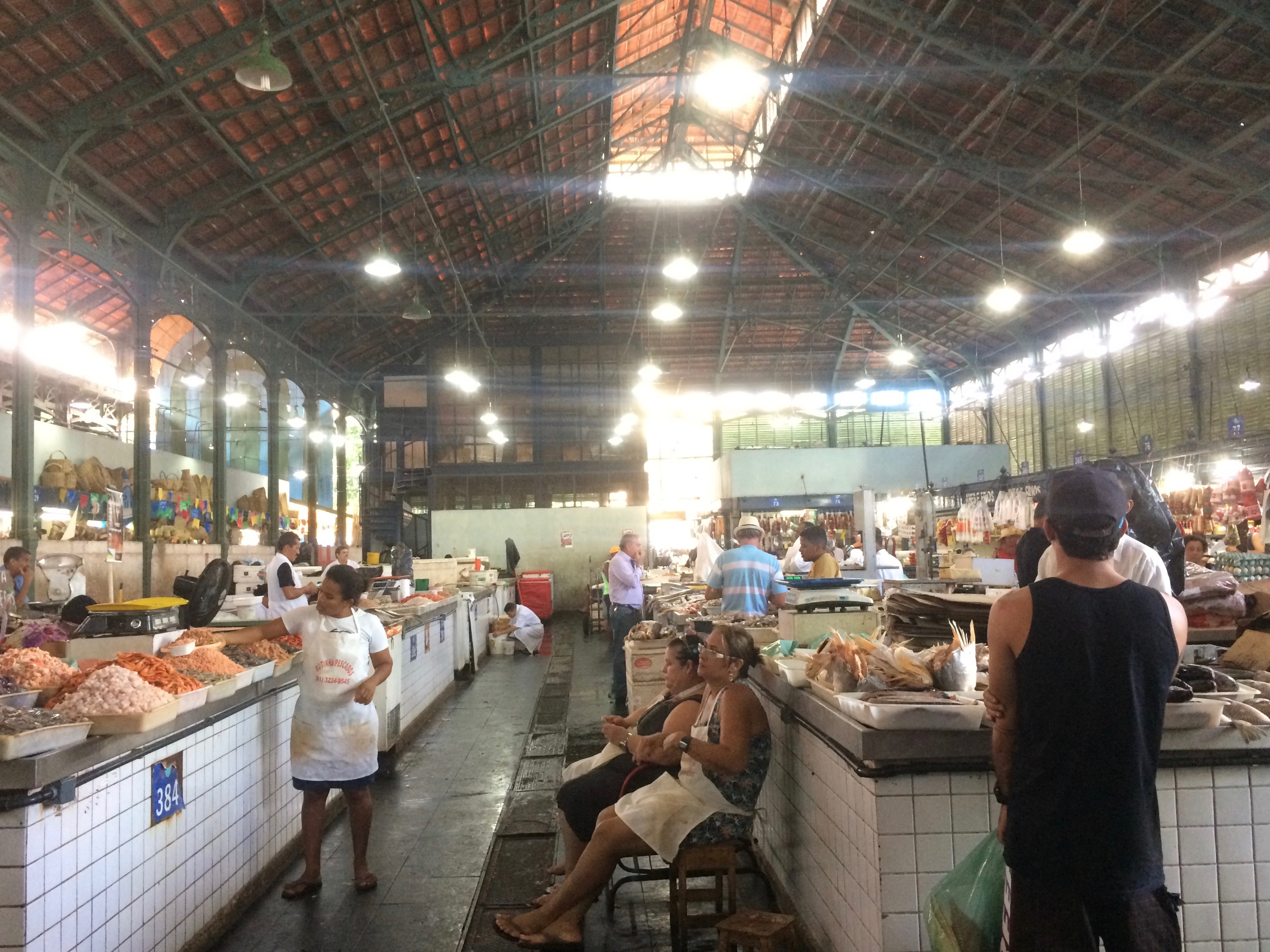
- Fresh seafood at Mercado de São José
- Interactive map of Saint Joseph's Market
- 8.06852°S 34.87768°W
- Location: Recife, Pernambuco

Site notes
- Governing body: Brazil

Mercado de São José (in English Saint Joseph's Market) is a public market in Recife, Pernambuco, Brazil. Founded in 1871, it is the oldest Brazilian building constructed of pre-manufactured iron.

The market is made up of 545 shops which sell a variety of fish, spices, herbs, crafts and cordel literature.

The market is a Brazilian historic heritage site.
