= Marcello Novaes =

Brazilian actor (born 1962)

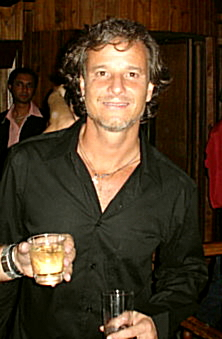
- Novaes in 2005
- Born: Marcello Tolentino Novaes; 13 August 1962 (age 62); Vitorino Freire, Maranhão, Brazil
- Occupation: Actor
- Years active: 1988–present
- Partner: Leticia Spiller (1995–2000)
- Children: 2

Marcello Tolentino Novaes (born 13 August 1962) is a Brazilian actor.

== Career ==
He studied at the drama school Tablado, along with Malu Mader, Drica Moraes, Maurício Mattar, and Felipe Camargo. His television debut was in 1988 on Vale Tudo telenovela. He has played the same role twice in separate soap operas, both written by Sílvio de Abreu.

His first lead came in 1994, the auto mechanic Raí in Quatro por Quatro. It was during that job he met and fell in love with actress Letícia Spiller. They married and had a son two years later. In 1996, he starred alongside Andréa Beltrão, Humberto Martins and Murilo Benício in the telenovela Vira-Lata (released as Underdog in the USA). He participated in the historical mini-series Chiquinha Gonzaga and the show Andando nas Nuvens in 1999. In 2000, he played the character Beterraba in telenovela Uga Uga. The following year he played Xande in O Clone, the bodyguard and boyfriend of an addicted rich girl. In 2003 he portrayed Ignácio in A Casa das Sete Mulheres and then the rustic Timóteo in Chocolate com Pimenta.

Due to the success of his partnership with author Glória Perez, that begun in O Clone, he returned to act on a show by the author in 2005, but his character left unnoticed in América. The actor showed displeasure with the incident.

He lived the co-star Vicente de Sete Pecados and then the surfer Sandro in Três Irmãs.

== Filmography ==
Year	Title	Role	Notes
2007	Sambando nas Brasas, Morô?	Pedro	
2008	O Guerreiro Didi e a Ninja Lili	Dr. Marcos	
2010	Desenrola	Gabriel	
2014	Casa Grande	Hugo Cavalcanti	

== Television ==
=== Soap ===
Year	Title	Role	Notes
1988	Vale Tudo	André	
1989	Top Model	Felipe	
1990	Rainha da Sucata	Geraldo	
1992	Deus Nos Acuda	Geraldo	
1994-1995	Quatro por Quatro	Raí	
1996	Vira-Lata	Fidel	
1997-1998	Zazá	Hugo Guerreiro	
1999	Andando nas Nuvens	Raul Pedreira	
2000	Uga-Uga	Beterraba	
2001-2002	O Clone	Xande	
2003-2004	Chocolate com Pimenta	Timóteo Mariano da Silva e Silva	
2005	América	Geninho	
2007-2008	Sete Pecados	Vicente de Freitas	
2008-2009	Três Irmãs	Sandro	
2009-2010	Cama de Gato	Bene	
2011	Cordel Encantado	Qui Qui	
2012	Avenida Brasil	Maxwell "Max" Oliveira	
2014	Casa Grande	Hugo	
2015	A Regra do Jogo	Vavá	
2016	Sol Nascente	Vittorio	
2017-2018	O Outro Lado do Paraíso	Renan	
2018-2019	O Sétimo Guardião	Sampaio Gomes	
2022	Além da Ilusão	Eugênio Barbosa	
2025	Dona de Mim	Jaques Boaz	

=== Miniseries and serials ===
Year	Title	Role	Notes
1992	Anos Rebeldes	Olavo	
1998	Malhação	Paulinho Kelé	Season 4
1999	Chiquinha Gonzaga	Jacinto Ribeiro do Amaral	
2003	A Casa das Sete Mulheres	Ignácio	
2006	Malhação	Daniel San Martin	Season 13
2024	Justiça 2	Egisto	

=== Special ===
Year	Title	Role	Notes
1998	Sai de Baixo	Godzilla	
2004	Sob Nova Direção	Flavia	
2008	Guerra e Paz	Rolandão	
2008	Casos e Acasos	Reinaldo / Paulo	
2008	Dicas de um Sedutor	Mauro	
