= Manuela Dias =

Brazilian actress and writer

- Born: 11 April 1977 (age 48); Salvador, Bahia, Brazil
- Occupations: Former actress, author, and screenwriter
- Years active: 1996–present
- Children: 1

Manuela Dias (born 11 April 1977) is a Brazilian former actress, author, and screenwriter. She performed on television as an actress in 1996 as a co-protagonist on Dona Anja, followed by her being on the cast of the 1998 film Brida. Since 2000, she has started a career in writing, also doing screenwriting, such as with the TV series Bambuluá. She was nominated for an International Emmy for her 2016 mini-series Justiça. In 2019, she created her first telenovela Amor de Mãe, on Rede Globo.

== Biography ==
Dias was born in 1977 in Salvador, Bahia. She is the daughter of actress Sônia Dias, who in part inspired her to write Amor de Mãe. She graduated with a degree in journalism from the Federal University of Bahia. She later graduated with a degree in film from Escola de Santo Antonio de los Baños in Cuba, where she was a student of Gabriel García Márquez.

In 2006, Dias participated in the Sundance Film Festival as a co-editor in the long film Only God Knows, directed by Carlos Bolado. She later became a screenwriter in five short-films, among them Deserto Feliz (2007), directed by Paulo Caldas; Transeunte, directed by Eryk Rocha; and O Céu Sobre os Ombros, by Sérgio Borges, where they won five awards at the Festival de Brasília in 2010. In 2011, the long film A Hora e a Vez de Augusto Matraga, directed by Vinícius Coimbra and screenplayed by Dias, was featured at the Rio de Janeiro International Film Festival and won five prizes, among them the Best Film award by the jury and by popular vote.

She later began to transition to writing for television, writing shows for TV Globo. She collaborated in series such as Aline, A Grande Família, Fama, and Sandy & Junior, and in telenovelas such as Cordel Encantado and Joia Rara. In 2014, she produced her first long film, Love Film Festival, with Leandra Leal and Manolo Cardona. While at Rede Globo, she wrote the screenplay for Ligações Perigosas at the beginning of 2016.

Dias wrote her first story while at Rede Globo directing the mini-series Justiça. In 2017, her draft for a novel was approved, with a provisional release for 2019 as her first novel. Her original series Amor de Mãe debuted in November 2019, with the series directed by José Luiz Villamarim. The series was, along with Salve-se Quem Puder, productions that were interrupted by the COVID-19 pandemic. It returned to production in March 2021.

== Personal life ==
As of 2020, Dias is in a relationship with actor Murilo Benício. She has a daughter, Helena, who also inspired her to write Amor da Mãe.

== Filmography ==
=== As screenwriter ===
==== Television ====
===== Telenovelas =====
Year	Title	Position	Co-writers	Broadcaster	Notes
2011	Cordel Encantado	Collaborator	Duca Rachid; Thelma Guedes	Rede Globo	
2013	Joia Rara	Collaborator	Duca Rachid; Thelma Guedes	Rede Globo	
2019–21	Amor de Mãe	Creator		Rede Globo	

===== Series and mini-series =====
Year	Title	Position	Co-writers	Broadcaster	Notes
2000–01	Bambuluá	Screenwriter	Roberto Talma	Rede Globo	
2002	Sandy & Junior	Screenwriter	Adriana Avellar; Sarah Lavigne; Thiago Marinho	Rede Globo	Season 4
2008	Faça Sua História	Screenwriter	João Ubaldo Ribeiro; Geraldo Carneiro	Rede Globo	
2008	Xuxa e as Noviças	Screenwriter	Cláudio Torres Gonzaga	Rede Globo	Year end special
2009	Geral.com	Screenwriter	Claudio Lobato	Rede Globo	Episode: "Baseado em Fatos Reais"
2009–11	Aline	Screenwriter	Mauro Wilson	Rede Globo	
2012	Acampamento de Férias	Screenwriter	Renato Aragão	Rede Globo	Season 3
2012	A Grande Família	Screenwriter	Cláudio Paiva	Rede Globo	Season 12
2016	Ligações Perigosas	Creator		Rede Globo	
2016	Justiça	Creator		Rede Globo	

==== Film ====
Year	Title	Notes
2007	Deserto Feliz	
2010	O Céu Sobre os Ombros	
2010	Transeunte	
2011	A Hora e a Vez de Augusto Matraga	
2014	Love Film Festival	
2015	A Floresta que se Move	
2021	Pixinguinha, Um Homem Carinhoso	Co-writer

=== As an actress ===
==== Television ====
Year	Title	Role
1996	Dona Anja	Aparecida Salena (Cida)
1998	Brida	Inês

== Books ==
- Diário da Dona Lurdes. São Paulo: Editora Melhoramentos, 2023. Spin-off of Amor de Mãe.

Berenice e Soriano- o livro. São Paulo: Editora Melhoramentos, 2023.
