= Murilo Benício =

Brazilian actor (born 1971)

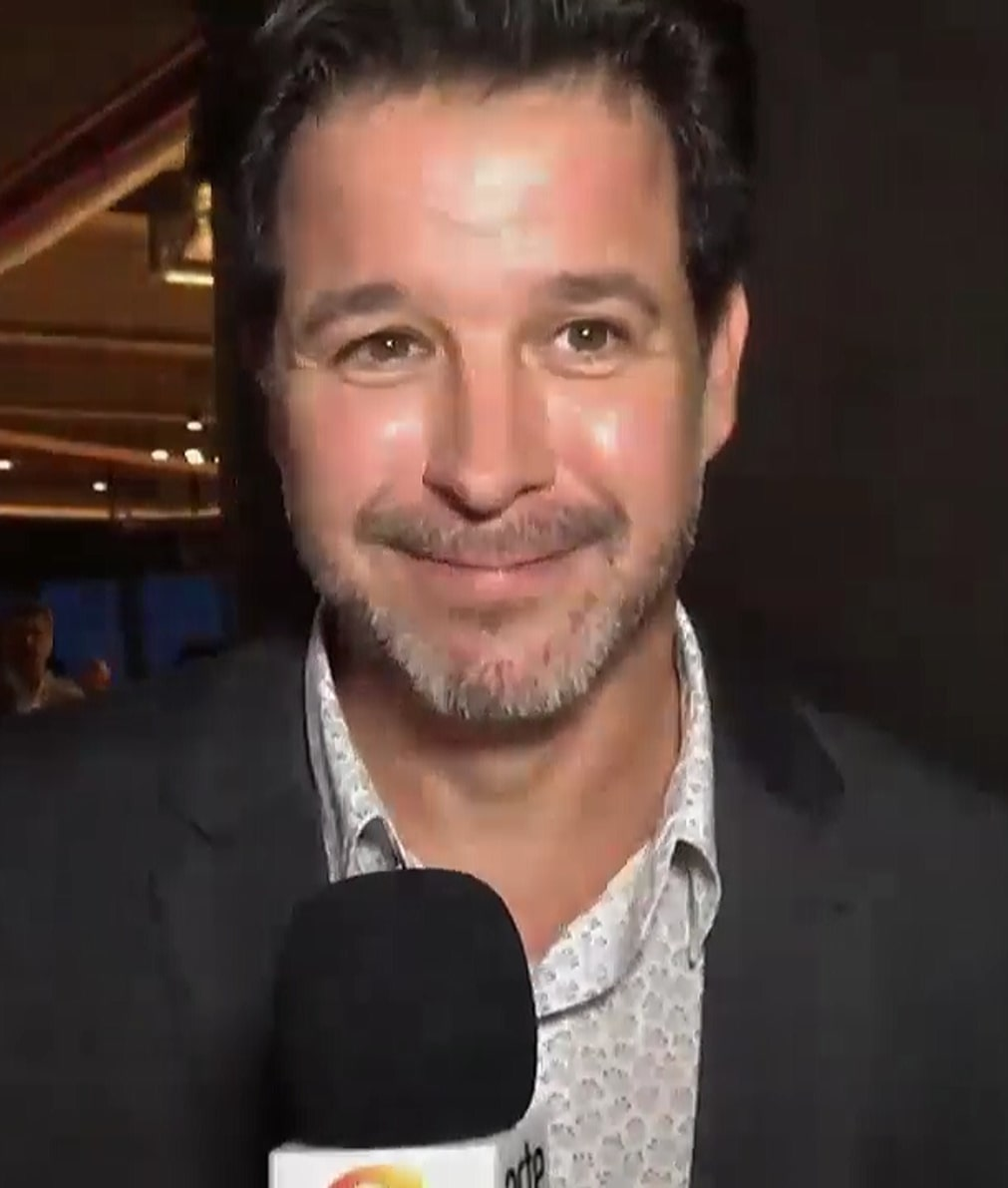
- Benicío in 2019
- Born: Murilo Benício Ribeiro; 13 July 1971 (age 54); Niterói, Rio de Janeiro, Brazil
- Occupation: Actor
- Years active: 1992–present
- Children: 2

Murilo Benício Ribeiro (Note: Portuguese pronunciation: [muˈɾi.lu beˈni.si.u ʁiˈbe(j).ɾu]) (born 13 July 1971) is a Brazilian actor. He is best known for his prominent roles in telenovelas such as O Clone, América, Por Amor, A Favorita, and Avenida Brasil.

Benício began his television career in the early 1990s, appearing in the telenovela Fera Ferida in a recurring role as Fabrício. His major breakthrough came with the critically acclaimed series O Clone (2001–2002), where he gained international recognition for his performance alongside co-star Giovanna Antonelli. The telenovela, created by Glória Perez, was a commercial success both in Brazil and abroad, establishing Benício as one of the leading actors of his generation.

Since then, Benício has received critical acclaim for his work in a wide range of television and film genres. Benício's subsequent telenovelas and television series include, Chocolate com Pimenta (2004), a novela created by Walcyr Carrasco, together with Mariana Ximenes, América (2005) together with Deborah Secco, Pé na Jaca (2007), A Favorita (2008), Ti Ti Ti, the successful Avenida Brasil (2012), and the technology themed telenovela Geração Brasil (2014).

He is also the recipient of awards such as the Prêmio Arte Qualidade Brasil, the Troféu Imprensa, the Prêmio Extra de Televisão, and the Prêmio Quem de Televisão.

== Career ==
Benicio's television roles include the popular telenovelas O Clone and América, both which have aired in his native Brazil, the United States, Russia and in various countries in Latin America, Europe, and Asia. He has also starred in The Man of the Year (2003).

== Personal life ==
Benício was born in Niteroi. As a teenager he liked to surf with friends on the beaches of Rio and Niterói, but stopped after starting work as an actor. He is quoted as saying that Charlie Chaplin inspired him as a young boy to be an actor. His favorite author is Miguel de Cervantes. He stated that as a youth he liked to smoke marijuana with all of his friends and never saw anything wrong with that, despite having stopped to become an actor. He started smoking cigarettes at age 26 and after more than ten years of smoking, he quit the habit. He says he does not drink excessively and, after many years, he returned to do physical exercises.

=== Family and relationships ===
In 1996 he began dating actress Alessandra Negrini. They moved in together and had a son, actor Antônio Benício, born in the same year. The marriage ended in 1999 due to constant disagreements, and before the child turned 1 year old.

In 1997 he met Carolina Ferraz in the telenovela Por Amor, and they became friends. At the time they met, Ferraz was married, but in 1999 she already separated so they started dating. They lived together but the relationship ended in 2001, when Carolina broke up with him because of excessive jealousy from Benício. In the same year of 2001, he met Giovanna Antonelli. They started dating in 2002 and a few months later they were living together. In 2004 they separated for a few months, but they reconciled and had a son, Pietro, born in 2005. In the same year, they separated because of irreconcilable differences.

In October 2012 Benicio admitted he was in a relationship with actress Débora Falabella. After a long time of speculation, the two decided to take courtship. According to the actor, the couple kept the relationship under wraps during the recording of the telenovela Avenida Brasil, who had already separated from their ex recently.

As of 2020, he has been in a relationship with author and screenwriter Manuela Dias.

== Filmography ==
=== Television ===
Year	Title	Role	Notes	Ref.
1993	Fera Ferida	Fabrício		
1995	Irmãos Coragem	Juca Cipó		
1995	A Comédia da Vida Privada	Marco Antônio	Episode: "Mãe é Mãe"	
1996	Vira-Lata	Bráulio Vianna / Dráuzio		
1997	A Justiceira	Junin	Special appearance	
1997	A Comédia da Vida Privada	Chico	Episode: "Anchietanos"	
1997	Por Amor	Leonardo Barros Mota (Léo)		
1998	Meu Bem Querer	Antônio Mourão		
1999	Você Decide	Gabriel	Episode: "Plano B"	
1999	Você Decide	Marcelo	Episode: "O Terceiro Homem"	
2000	Esplendor	Cristóvão Rocha		
2001	O Clone	Lucas Ferraz		
2001	O Clone	Diogo Ferraz	Episodes: "1–6 October"	
2001	O Clone	Edvaldo Leandro da Silva Ferraz (Léo)		
2001	Os Normais	Tato	Episode: "Normal, Apenas Normal"	
2001	Brava Gente	Delegado Vilela / João	Episodes: "A Coleira do Cão", "O Condomínio"	
2003	Chocolate com Pimenta	Danilo Albuquerque		
2005	América	Sebastião da Silva Higino (Tião)		
2005–07	Os Amadores	Guilherme Ferreira		
2006	Pé na Jaca	Arthur Fortuna		
2008	A Favorita	Eduardo "Dodi" Gentil		
2009–11	Força-Tarefa	Tenente Wilson		
2010	Ti Ti Ti	Ariclenes Martins / Victor Valentim		
2012	Avenida Brasil	Tufão (Jorge Araújo)		
2014	Geração Brasil	Jonas Marra		
2014	Amores Roubados	Jaime Favais		
2016	Nada Será Como Antes	Saulo Ribeiro		
2018	Se Eu Fechar Os Olhos Agora	Adriano Marques Torres		
2019	Amor de Mãe	Raul Camargo		
2022	Pantanal	Tenório Pereira Santos		
2024	Justiça 2	Jayme Teixeira		
2025	Três Graças	Santiago Ferette		

=== Film ===
Year	Title	Role	Notes	Ref.
1995	O Monge e a Filha do Carrasco	Ambrosius		
1997	Os Matadores	Toninho		
1997	Decisão	Roberto	Short film	
1999	Orfeu	Lucinho		
1999	Até Que a Vida Nos Separe	Tonho		
2000	Woman on Top	Toninho Oliveira		
2001	Amores Possíveis	Carlos		
2002	The Man of the Year	Maiquel		
2004	Sexo, Amor e Traição	Carlos		
2005	Paid	Michael Ângelo		
2006	Casseta & Planeta: Seus Problemas Acabaram!!!	Dr. Botelho Pinto		
2007	Inesquecível	Diego Borges		
2012	E Aí... Comeu?	Wôlnei		
2013	Epic	Bomba	Portuguese voice over translation	
2017	Divórcio	Júlio		
2018	O Animal Cordial	Inácio		
2024	IF	Blue	Portuguese voice over translation	
2025	Assalto à Brasileira †	Paulo		
2026	Nico †	Márcio		

Key
†	Denotes films that have not yet been released

As director
Year	Title	Notes	Ref.
2018	O Beijo no Asfalto	Also screenplay and producer	
2023	Pérola	Also screenplay	

== Theatre ==
Year	Title	Role	Ref.
1996	As Tias do Mauro Rasi	Mauro Rasi	
1998	Deus	Ator Grego	
2003	Dois na Gangorra	Jerry	
2006	Fica Comigo Esta Noite	Edu	

== Awards and nominations ==
Year	Awards	Category	Nominated work	Result	Ref.
1994	Troféu APCA	Male Revelation	Fera Ferida	Won	
2001	Grande Prêmio Cinema Brasil	Best Actor	Amores Possíveis	Nominated	
2002	Prêmio Arte Qualidade Brasil RJ	Best Telenovela Actor	O Clone	Won	
2002	Prêmio Austregésilo de Athayde	Best Actor	O Clone	Won	
2003	Festival de Cinema Latino-Americano de Washington	Best Actor	O Homem do Ano	Won	
2003	Festival de Cinema Brasileiro de Miami	Best Actor	O Homem do Ano	Won	
2008	Prêmio Minha Novela	Best Actor	A Favorita	Won	
2009	Troféu Imprensa	Best Actor	A Favorita	Won	
2010	Prêmio Arte Qualidade Brasil	Best Actor	Ti Ti Ti	Won	
2010	Prêmio Extra de Televisão	Best Actor	Ti Ti Ti	Won	
2010	Troféu APCA	Best Actor	Ti Ti Ti	Won	
2010	Prêmio Minha Novela	Best Actor	Ti Ti Ti	Won	
2011	Troféu Imprensa	Best Actor	Ti Ti Ti	Nominated	
2012	Prêmio Extra de Televisão	Best Actor	Avenida Brasil	Nominated	
2013	Troféu Internet	Best Actor	Avenida Brasil	Won	
2013	Troféu Imprensa	Best Actor	Avenida Brasil	Won	
2014	Prêmio F5	Best Telenovela Actor	Geração Brasil	Nominated	
2014	Prêmio F5	Best Actor	Amores Roubados	Won	
