= Murder of Marcos Matsunaga =

2012 murder in São Paulo, Brazil

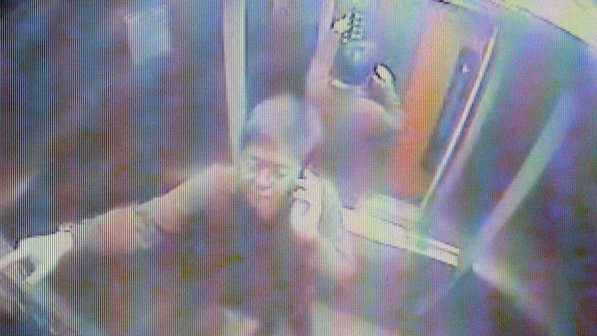
- Marcos goes downstairs to pick up a pizza at 7:30 p.m. These are the last images of the businessman alive.
- Location: Vila Leopoldina; São Paulo, Brazil
- Date: Between May 19 and 20, 2012
- Target: Marcos Kitano Matsunaga
- Weapon: .380 ACP Semi-Automatic Pistol
- Deaths: 1
- Convicted: Elize Araújo Kitano Matsunaga (currently Elize Araújo Giacomini)

The Matsunaga case refers to the murder of Japanese Brazilian businessman Marcos Kitano Matsunaga, which occurred on May 19, 2012, when he was the 41-year-old chief executive officer of the food company Yoki. The crime was committed by his wife, Elize Araújo Kitano Matsunaga, then 30 years old, who confessed to killing him with a .380 caliber pistol shot to the head and dismembering his body. According to her, the motive for the crime was her discovery of her husband's extramarital affair.

According to Elize, she alone was responsible for the crime, ruling out the involvement of any other person. The case concluded in the early hours of December 5, 2016, when Judge Adilson Paukoski delivered the verdict sentencing her to 19 years, 11 months, and one day in prison. Elize was convicted of qualified murder under the provisions of Article 121, §2 of the Brazilian Penal Code. The case was listed by the Brasil Online (BOL) portal among the "22 crimes that shocked Brazil."

== Author and victim ==
=== Elize Matsunaga ===
Elize Araújo Giacomini (known at the time of the crime as Elize Araújo Kitano Matsunaga; Chopinzinho, November 29, 1981), who confessed to the crime, was born into a poor family in a town of just over 20,000 inhabitants in the interior of Paraná. Raised by her single mother, who worked as a domestic worker, Elize spent her childhood in the town and attended public schools, where she was regarded as a good student and had no behavioral problems. At the age of 18, she moved to Curitiba, about 400 kilometers (250 miles) from her hometown, to enroll in a nursing technician course and began working at a hospital. Shortly afterward, she moved to the city of São Paulo, where she became a prostitute, offering her services through a dating website. It was in this way that Elize met Marcos Kitano while he was still married. Elize holds a bachelor's degree in law.

=== Marcos Matsunaga ===
Marcos Kitano Matsunaga (São Paulo, October 1, 1970 – São Paulo, May 20, 2012), the victim of the crime, son of Misako Kitano and Mitsuo Matsunaga, he had a brother, Mauro Kitano Matsunaga, spent his childhood in the Parque Continental neighborhood and attended some of the region's most prestigious schools, graduating from Colégio Santa Cruz in 1988. He later studied business administration at the FGV. His family inherited the food company Yoki, founded in the 1960s by his grandfather, Yoshizo Kitano. Control of the company was passed on to Marcos after he completed his studies. Several years later, while already married with Lívia de Sousa and father of a daughter, he met Elize through a dating website.

== Relationship ==
=== Meeting and arguments ===
Marcos met Elize in 2004 through a dating website where she advertised herself as a prostitute. She reportedly caught the attention of the Yoki chief executive, who, despite being married, began meeting with her. Elize remained the executive's mistress for three years without Marcos's wife suspecting the affair. He eventually separated from his wife and married Elize in October 2009. Their wedding, attended by around 300 guests, included both a civil and a religious ceremony at the Anglican Church. According to statements from relatives and acquaintances to investigators, the couple had a harmonious relationship and rarely argued until mid-2010. Their relationship became strained when Elize began suspecting that Marcos was being unfaithful. According to former employees of the couple's apartment, arguments became frequent from that point onward. In one account, an employee stated that Elize forced Marcos to dismiss a secretary after suspecting they were having an affair. Some time later, Elize found messages exchanged between Marcos and another woman, further strengthening her suspicions. At the end of 2010, Elize became pregnant, and after the birth of their daughter, Helena Araújo Kitano Matsunaga, the arguments subsided. In the months leading up to the crime, however, she again questioned her husband's fidelity, complaining about Marcos's emotional distance and the deterioration of their relationship.

=== Discovery of the affair ===
In May 2012, Elize hired a private investigator to determine whether Marcos was cheating on her after discovering emails exchanged with an escort from the Escorts Vogue website, where Elize herself had advertised her services before marrying Matsunaga. Elize later confirmed through other women from the website that her husband continued to meet escorts. During this period, she traveled to her hometown in Paraná while receiving updates from the investigator. On the night of her departure, May 17, 2012, Marcos met his lover at the Mercure Hotel in Vila Olímpia, São Paulo. The two reportedly had dinner together at the Alucci Alucci restaurant before returning to the hotel. The investigator photographed the meeting and sent the images to Elize, who returned to São Paulo on May 19, when she committed the crime. In the weeks preceding the murder, the couple reportedly spied on each other. Marcos accused Elize of returning to prostitution and maintaining another lover with his money after discovering fake profiles she allegedly used on another escort website under the names Juliana and Marielly.

=== Sport hunting ===
Elize and Marcos held registration certificates issued by the Brazilian Army allowing them to collect firearms as well as practice sport shooting and hunting. In other words, they were registered as CACs (Collectors, Shooters and Hunters), a category that grants the legal right to possess firearms. Photographs of the couple showed them participating in hunting trips. In one image, Elize and Marcos posed smiling beside a dead animal. In a television report, Elize's hairdresser stated that she enjoyed displaying her hunting trophies—the heads of dead animals—on the walls of their home.

== Murder ==
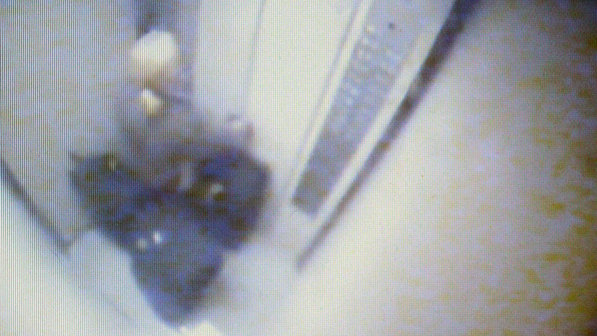
The day after the crime, Elize left the Matsunaga couple's apartment at 11:30 a.m. carrying three suitcases containing her husband's dismembered body.

Security camera footage from the apartment building helped police reconstruct the crime. On Saturday, May 19, at around 6:30 p.m., the couple arrived at the building with their one-year-old daughter and the nanny, who was dismissed shortly afterward. About an hour later, at approximately 7:30 p.m., Marcos went downstairs to pick up a pizza. According to police, the Yoki CEO was seen on the surveillance footage talking on the phone with his father. These were the last images of the businessman alive. The cause of the death it was officially determined to be asphyxia due to aspiration of blood resulting from decapitation or throat-slitting, associated with craniocerebral trauma caused by a gunshot. The following day, Sunday, at 5:00 a.m., another nanny arrived at the building. At around 11:30 a.m., Elize left carrying three suitcases, which allegedly contained her husband's dismembered body. She returned about 12 hours later without the suitcases.

While transporting the body, Elize was stopped by the Federal Highway Police because her vehicle documentation was irregular. Marcos's body was inside the luggages in the trunk of the car, which were not inspected by the officers. Elize was in the Capão Bonito region of São Paulo state when she was fined and was initially heading toward Paraná before changing course and returning toward São Paulo. Marcos's body was later found inside plastic bags in Cotia, in the Greater São Paulo area. Using data from Elize's mobile phone provider, investigators determined that she had been at the location, traveling approximately 40 kilometers (25 miles) to dispose of the body.

== Aftermath ==
=== Pretrial detention ===
After Marcos Kitano's remains were discovered and identified, Elize confessed to the crime. She was arrested by the São Paulo police on June 4, 2012. The following day, her attorney requested the revocation of her temporary detention, but the request was denied by the judge of the Criminal Court of Cotia. Her temporary detention was due to expire on June 21; however, the Public Prosecutor's Office requested that Elize remain in preventive detention until trial. Prosecutor José Carlos Cosenzo stated that her case "strictly met the requirements for preventive detention".

=== The couple's daughter ===
At the time of the crime, Helena, the Matsunagas' daughter was one year old. She was initially placed in the temporary custody of Elize's sister. According to both families, a legal dispute over custody of the child, who had lost her father and whose mother was in custody, was ruled out. Elize's family, through its attorney, stated that it did not intend to seek custody, while Marcos's family also considered a custody dispute unnecessary. Her daughter, Helena, is now a teenager living with her paternal grandparents (the Matsunaga family), who maintain a strict no-contact policy preventing Elize from seeing or speaking to her.

=== Conviction ===
The trial began at 11:16 a.m. on November 22, 2016, at the Barra Funda Courthouse in São Paulo and lasted until December 2. Nineteen witnesses testified before the jury. A relief nanny, the first witness to testify, stated that her mother, who also worked as a nanny for the family, had told her that Elize purchased an electric saw on the day before Marcos Matsunaga's death. Elize's defense argued that the tool had not been used in the dismemberment.

One of the longest criminal trials in the history of the São Paulo judiciary, lasting seven days, concluded on December 5, 2016, when the jury found Elize Matsunaga guilty and sentenced her to 19 years, 11 months, and one day in prison under a closed regime for the murder, destruction, and concealment of her husband's body. She served the final portion of her sentence in the women's wing of the Tremembé Penitentiary, in Tremembé, São Paulo, alongside other notorious convicted murderers such as Suzane von Richthofen and Anna Carolina Jatobá.

On December 4, 2016, one day before the trial concluded, Elize stated that she "was not herself" on the day of the crime when she shot Marcos and expressed remorse for having done so.

=== Sentence reduction and parole ===
On March 22, 2019, the Superior Court of Justice (STJ) reduced Elize's sentence to 16 years and 3 months, taking into account her confession to the crime.

In 2022, after serving ten years of her sentence, Elize Matsunaga was granted parole. She later worked as a ride-hailing driver in the interior of São Paulo.

== In popular culture ==
The case is covered in the four-part documentary Elize Matsunaga: Once Upon a Crime, produced by Boutique Filmes and released on Netflix on July 8, 2021. In the drama series Tremembé, released on Prime Video on October 31, 2025, Elize Matsunaga is portrayed by actress Carol Garcia, depicting her life in the women's wing of the Tremembé Penitentiary alongside other notorious inmates, including Suzane von Richthofen (Richthofen case) and Anna Carolina Jatobá (Nardoni case).

The film Elize: Shadows of a Woman, produced by Boutique Filmes and distributed by Netflix, premiered on the streaming service on July 22, 2026, and is based on the case. Actress Lorena Comparato portrays Elize Matsunaga in the film.
