= Lorena Comparato =

Brazilian actress (born 1990)

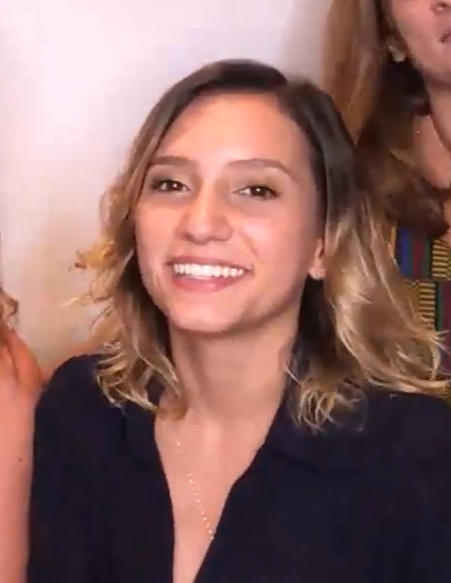
- Comparato in 2019
- Born: Lorena de Souza Mendes; March 14, 1990 (age 36); Lisbon, Portugal
- Citizenship: Brazilian; Portuguese
- Education: Escola de Artes Célia Helena; Pontifical Catholic University of Rio de Janeiro; British School of Rio de Janeiro; UCLA Exchange
- Occupations: Actress; Director; Producer; Writer
- Years active: 2009–present
- Father: Doc Comparato
- Relatives: Bianca Comparato (sister)

Lorena de Souza Mendes Comparato (Brazilian Portuguese pronunciation: [loh-REH-nah dji SOH-zah MEN-jees kohm-pah-RAH-too]; born March 14, 1990) better known as Lorena Comparato, is a Portuguese-Brazilian actress, screenwriter, director, producer, voice actress and presenter born in Portugal.

Comparato's career began as a Child actor when she played a supporting role in TV Globinho on the Rede Globo from 2009 to 2012. She made his television debut in the drama Fora de Controle (2012) followed by roles as Britney Santos in the romance drama Do Amor (2012) and the Comedy television series Pé na Cova (2013-2016) and Rock Story (2016).

== Early life and education ==
Lorena de Souza Mendes Comparato was born on March 14, 1990, in Lisbon, Portugal, to writer Doc Comparato, of Portuguese and Italian descent, and speech coach and actor preparer Leila (née Mendes) Comparato. She grew up in Sintra before moving back to Brazil. Comparato, therefore, holds both Portuguese and Brazilian citizenship, with her Portuguese citizenship being recognized after the age of 8. She has two older sisters, Bianca, who is an actress, and Fabiana, who is a screenwriter.

She studied theatre from an early age before returning to Brazil. Comparato later enrolled herself at Pontifical Catholic University of Rio de Janeiro (PUC-Rio), where she earned a Bachelor’s degree in Communications. She also participate in student exchange program at the University of California. Later, she obtained her master’s degree in Performing Arts from ESCH (Escola Superior de Artes Célia Helena), São Paulo.

== Career ==
Comparato began her career in television as a presenter on TV Globinho program before transitioning to acting. She became a member of the theater group named Cia. de Quatro Mulheres along with three other actresses, Andrezza Abreu, Anita Chaves, and Karina Ramil, in 2011. The following year, she made her television debut as an actress in the police series Fora de Controle (2012), broadcast by RecordTV, followed by a role in the series Do Amor.

In 2013, she joined the regular cast of the sitcom Pé na Cova, on TV Globo, playing Abigail, a character who had a relationship with the owner of a funeral home. She remained on the series until its conclusion in 2016. In the same year, she made appearances in the productions TOC's de Dalila and the series E Aí... Comeu?. Also in 2016, she debuted in her first telenovela, Rock Story, in the role of Vanessa. The telenovela aired until 2017. During the same period, she participated in the drama series Cidade Proibida.

She joined the cast of the comedy series Samantha! in 2018, playing the role of Laila, a digital influencer. That same year, she began playing Geise in the Star+ series Impuros. In 2019, she returned to TV Globo for a special appearance in the series Cine Holliúdy, playing Formosa. The character would return in a regular role in the following seasons of the series, broadcast in 2022 and 2023. She also played Tainá, a stripper in the comedy series Homens?.

In 2020, Comparato played Celeste in Boca de Ouro, a film adaptation of the play by Nelson Rodrigues. For her performance, she received the Best Actress award at the Miami Brazilian Film Festival. In 2021, she made a guest appearance in the telenovela Um Lugar ao Sol, portraying the younger version of Ana Beatriz Nogueira's character during the opening phase of the story. That same year, she joined the cast of the television series Filhas de Eva as Suzana, a sex worker, and appeared in the films Lacuna and Amarração do Amor.

Comparato starred in the lead role in the Brazilian adaptation of the television series Não Foi Minha Culpa in 2022, a series about domestic violence that follows the franchise's original version. In the same year, she played Glaúcia Figueira, a novice sertanejo artist, in the musical television series Rensga Hits!. In 2023, she was cast of the films Regra 34 and Meu Álbum de Amores.

In 2025, Comparato returned as cast with a leading role in the sketch sitcom Volte Sempre, playing Narcisa Aparecida. She also made a guest appearance in the seventh season of the comedy series Tô de Graça, playing a nun. That same year, she appeared in the television special in Falas de Orgulho, which focused on LGBTQ+ representation, and Falas de Acesso, which explored the experiences of people with disabilities.

In 2026, Comparato played Elize Matsunaga in the Netflix film Elize: Shadows of a Woman, written by Raphael Montes. The movie is about the Murder of Marcos Matsunaga.

== Filmography ==
=== Television ===
Year	Title	Role
2009	TV Globinho	Presenter
2012	Fora de Controle	Juliana
2012	Do Amor	Britney Santos
2013–2016	Pé na Cova	Abigail de Jesus Pereira
2016	TOC's de Dalila	Cristal
2016	E Aí... Comeu?	Lua
2016–2017	Rock Story	Vanessa do Rosário
2017	Cidade Proibida	Dora Passos
2018–2019	Malhação: Vidas Brasileiras	Camila Alves ("Mila")
2018–2019	Samantha!	Laila
2018–2026	Impuros	Geise Rocha Ferreira
2019–2020	Homens?	Tainá Almeida
2019–2023	Cine Holliúdy	Formosa da Fonseca
2021	Filhas de Eva	Suzana Prata
2021	Um Lugar ao Sol	Elenice Muniz Meirelles (young)
2022	Não Foi Minha Culpa	Priscila Santos
2022–2025	Rensga Hits!	Glaúcia Figueira
2025	Tô de Graça	Madre Ana Paula
2025	Falas de Orgulho	Marcelle
2025	Falas de Acesso	Marcelle
2025	Volte Sempre	Narcisa Aparecida

=== Film ===
Year	Title	Role
2010	Handebol	Bia
2014	Lemming	Milla
2015	Angústia	Garota Bling Ring
2015	Amor Suspenso	Maria
2015	Mate-Me Por Favor	Garota Morta
2016	É Fada!	Patricinha Loura
2017	E.A.S.: Esquadrão Antissequestro	Maiara
2020	Boca de Ouro	Celeste
2021	Lacuna	Sofia
2021	Amarração do Amor	Cleyde
2023	Regra 34	Lúcia
2023	Meu Álbum de Amores	Catarina
2026	O Advogado de Deus	Lídia
2026	Trago Seu Amor	Paty
2026	Elize: Shadows of a Woman	Elize Matsunaga
2026	Teia	Beatriz

== Awards and nominations ==
=== Film and television ===
Year	Award	Category	Nominated work	Result
2015	Festival BR Internacional de Cinema	Best Supporting Actress	Angústia (Short)	Won
2020	CINE Fest Brasil Montevideo	Best Actress	Boca de Ouro	Won
2020	Séries em Cena	Best Actress	Homens?	Nominated
2021	Brazilian Film Festival of Miami	Best Actress	Boca de Ouro	Won
2021	Grande Prêmio do Cinema Brasileiro	Best Actress	Boca de Ouro	Nominated
2022	Prêmio Pena de Prata	Best Actress	Rensga Hits!	Nominated
2022	Prêmio Novelando	Best Actress	Rensga Hits!	Nominated
2025	PRODU Awards	Best Lead Actress in a Crime/Prison Drama	Impuros	Nominated

=== Theatre ===
Year	Award	Category	Nominated work	Result
2016–2019	FITA (Festa Internacional de Teatro de Angra)	Best Play	Não Tô Entendendo Nada	Won
2016–2019	FITA (Festa Internacional de Teatro de Angra)	Best Cast	Não Tô Entendendo Nada	Won
2013	Zilka Salaberry Awards	Best Actress	Nadistas e Tudistas	Nominated
2024	FITA (Festa Internacional de Teatro de Angra)	Best Supporting Actress	Bonitinha, Mas Ordinária	Nominated

=== Independent projects and festivals ===
Year	Award	Category	Nominated work	Result
2020	Promax Award	Silver Award	E! No Filter WNKDS 2 (Cia de 4)	Won
