= Scars of Beauty =

Brazilian telenovela

- Brazilian Portuguese: Beleza Fatal
- Genre: Telenovela
- Created by: Raphael Montes
- Written by: Raphael Montes; Mariana Torres; Victor Atherino; Manuela Cantuária; Rafael Souza-Ribeiro
- Directed by: Maria de Médicis; Giovanna Machline; Matheus Senra; Rafael Miranda Fejes
- Starring: Camila Pitanga; Camila Queiroz; Giovanna Antonelli
- Country of origin: Brazil
- Original language: Portuguese
- No. of seasons: 1
- No. of episodes: 40

Production
- Executive producers: Silvio de Abreu; Raphael Montes; Thamara Damasceno; Mariano Cesar; Monica Albuquerque; Edna Palatnik; Anouk Aaron; Renata Rezende; Barbara Carvalho
- Producers: Geórgia Costa Araújo; Luciano Patrick
- Production company: Coração da Selva

Original release
- Network: Max
- Release: 27 January – 21 March 2025

Scars of Beauty (Portuguese: Beleza Fatal, lit. 'Fatal Beauty') is a Brazilian telenovela created by Raphael Montes. It stars Camila Pitanga, Camila Queiroz and Giovanna Antonelli. It premiered on Max on 27 January 2025.

== Plot ==
As a child, Sofia saw her mother, Cléo, imprisoned and unjustly killed by her aunt Lola, an ambitious and unscrupulous woman. With no nowhere to go, Sofia is taken in by the loving Paixão family, led by the mysterious Elvira, who is also suffering because her daughter Rebeca, an aspiring model, ended up in hospital after unsuccessful plastic surgery. The person responsible for the surgery is Benjamin Argento, a plastic surgeon and heir to a beauty empire. Years later, Sofia plots her revenge. With the help of the Paixão family, Sofia wants to destroy Lola and all those who have wronged her. In her obsession, Sofia is reunited with a childhood sweetheart, Gabriel, son of Lola and Rubém, whose dream is to become a policeman like his father, questioning her own steps and discovering that doing justice comes at a very high price.

== Cast ==
- Camila Pitanga as Lola Fernandes Argento
- Camila Queiroz as Sofia Fernandes / Júlia Guimarães
  - Melissa Sampaio as child Sofia
- Giovanna Antonelli as Elvira Paixão
- Caio Blat as Dr. Benjamin Argento
- Marcelo Serrado as Rog Ferreira "Dr. Peitão"
- Julia Stockler as Gisela Argento
- Romaní as Gabriel Fernandes Carvalho
  - Noah Moi as child Gabriel
- Breno Ferreira as Alec Paixão
  - Raphael Raposo as child Alec
- Manu Morelli as Caroline Argento Monteiro
  - Gaby Martins as child Caroline
- Naruna Costa as Vivianne
- Mônica Torres as Ana
- Kiara Felippe as Andrea Reys
- Drayson Menezzes
- Murilo Rosa as Dr. Tomás Monteiro
- Herson Capri as Dr. Átila Argento
- Vanessa Giácomo as Cléonice "Cléo" Fernandes
- Augusto Madeira as Lino Paixão
- Martha Meola as Kelly
- Patrícia Gasppar as Ramona
- Leonardo Miggiorin as Rafuda
- Pepita as Bel
- Mariana Molina as Mariana
- Lua Lucas as Cidinha
- Santiago Acosta as Javier
- Georgette Fadel as Nara
- Ana Kutner
- Luciano Chirolli
- Marat Descartes as Gilberto
- Fernanda Marques as Rebeca "Beca" Paixão
- Rei Black as Rubem
- Valesca Popozuda as herself
- Nicole Bahls as herself
- Hugo Gloss as himself

== Production ==
As a newcomer to Brazil, Max was already showing that it wanted to be a market leader in telenovelas and a direct competitor to Globoplay's exclusive telenovelas. To achieve this, it sought to hire big names from its main competitor. In 2021, Mônica Albuquerque took over the series and telenovelas area at Warner Bros. Discovery and Silvio de Abreu was hired by the streaming service, with the position of Supervisor of Telenovelas, a position similar to the one he held at TV Globo. To develop the telenovela, HBO announced the hiring of Raphael Montes, writer and screenwriter of Good Morning, Verônica, The Girl Who Killed Her Parents and The Boy Who Killed My Parents. On 8 April 2022, it was announced that the telenovela would be titled Segundas Intenções, inspired by the protagonist's revenge. In January 2023, however, the telenovela changed its title to Beleza Fatal. In September 2022, after several postponements, the telenovela was temporarily canceled due to the merger between Warner and Discovery, but Raphael continued developing it and delivered all the written episodes. The show was originally to have been directed by Joana Jabace, who left the production after the temporary cancellation, being replaced by Maria de Medicis. Filming began in September 2023 with locations in Rio de Janeiro and São Paulo.

== Release ==
Scars of Beauty premiered on 27 January 2025, with five new episodes being released weekly. On 22 January 2025, Band announced the acquisition of the telenovela for broadcast television. It premiered on 10 March 2025.

== Reception ==
=== Ratings ===
Scars of Beauty debuted on Band with 1.6 points and a peak of 2.9 in the metropolitan region of São Paulo, the country's main metropolis. Despite occupying fourth place, the telenovela did not change Band's prime time ratings. In the National Television Panel (PNT), it premiered with 1.4 points. The second episode registered 1.3 points, but continued to fall, reaching a peak of 0.8.

=== Critical response ===
The telenovela was well received by the public, with the performances of Camila Pitanga, Camila Queiroz and Giovanna Antonelli being the most praised, as well as many comparisons with TV Globo's current telenovelas. The plot has even been praised by writers of TV Globo, such as Gloria Perez and Ricardo Linhares.
