= Raphael Montes =

Brazilian crime novelist and lawyer (born 1990)

Raphael Montes de Carvalho
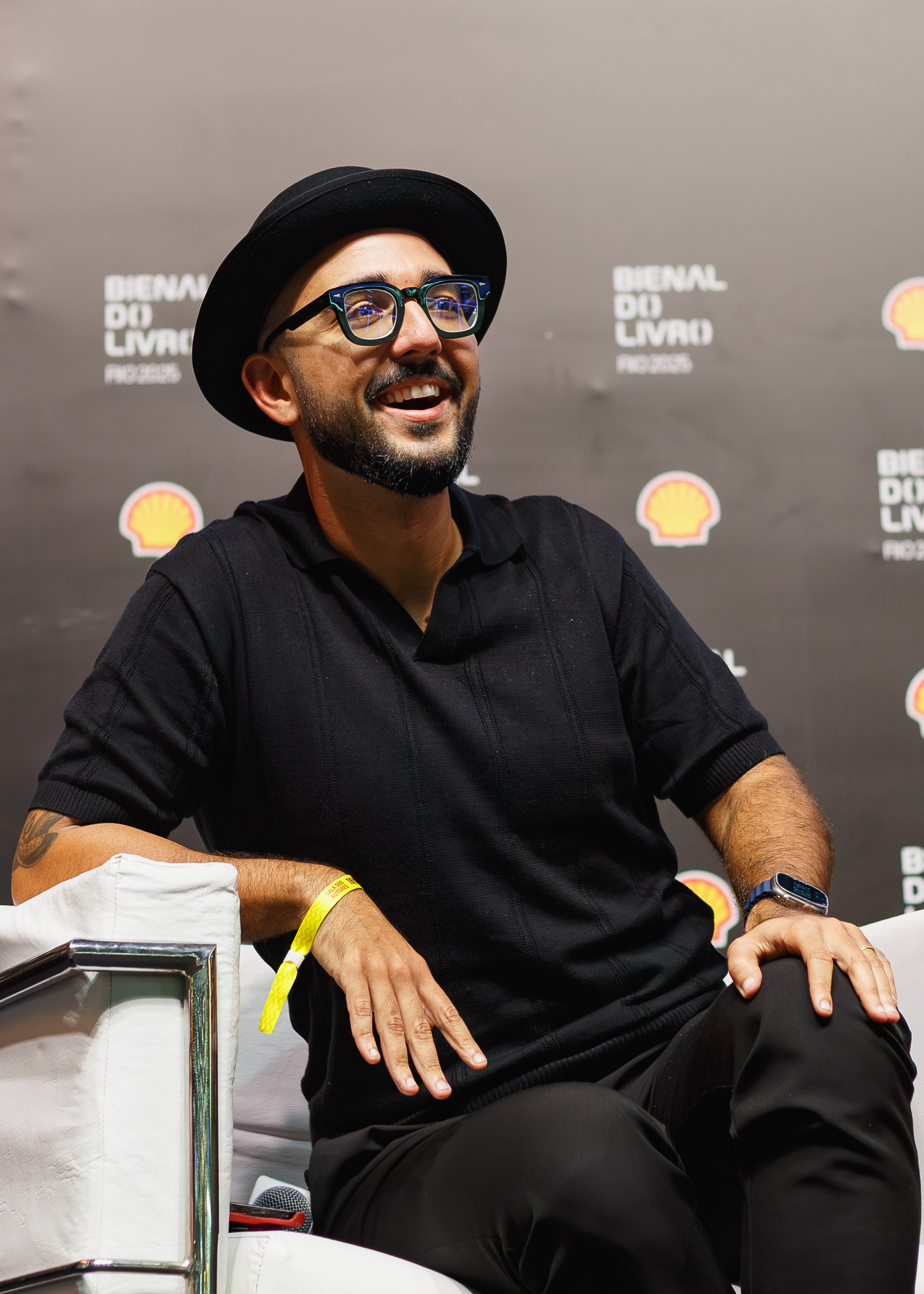
- Born: September 22, 1990 (age 35); Rio de Janeiro, Rio de Janeiro, Brazil
- Years active: 2009-present
- Website: www.raphaelmontes.com.br

Raphael Montes de Carvalho (born September 22, 1990) is a Brazilian crime novelist, and screenwriter. He was twice shortlisted for the Jabuti Award, winning once.

== Career ==
Montes was born in Rio de Janeiro on 22 September 1990. He studied at Colégio de São Bento, where he attended middle-school and high-school. He then studied law at the Universidade do Estado do Rio de Janeiro, graduating in 2012.

He debuted in literature in 2009, publishing in the police anthology Assassinos S / A: Brazilian police tales (Editora Multifoco), by the editor Frodo Oliveira and organizer Jana Lauxen. His first tale to win the pages of a book was "The Teacher" in volume 1 of the anthology. He also published in the anthology Beco do Crime (Frodo Oliveira and André Esteves) also in 2009, by the same Editora Multifoco.

In 2010, Montes participated in a contest from Brazilian publishing house Benvirá/Saraiva, in which his novel Suicidas was awarded second place. Saraiva published the novel under their label Benvirá in 2012. The gruesome themes present in the story and Montes’ young age earned him widespread notoriety in Brazil.

In 2014, Montes published his second novel, Dias Perfeitos (Perfect Days), and as of February 2016, the novel has been released in 14 countries. Both, first and second books, had the rights sold to film adaptations.

The Village, his third book, is a fix-up horror novel throughout comics draws short stories of macabre characters are told.

The author's fourth book, Jantar Secreto (Secret Dinner), has divided opinions in 2016 when it was discovered that cannibalism was the main theme but both sides confirmed that it was the best book written by Montes.

== Works ==
=== Books ===
Title	Year	Type	Notes
Suicidas	2012	Novel	Won the Benvirá Awards and the Machado de Assis Awards
Dias Perfeitos (Perfect Days)	2014	Novel	
O Vilarejo	2015	Short story collection	
Bom Dia, Verônica	2016	Novel	With Ilana Casoy
Jantar Secreto	2016	Novel	Won Jabuti Awards
Uma Mulher no Escuro	2019	Novel	
A Mágica Mortal	2023	Young-adult Novel	
Uma Família Feliz	2024	Novel	Nominated - Jabuti Awards
A Estranha na Cama	2026	Novel	

=== Television ===
Title	Year	Credit	Notes
Espinoza	2015	Writer	
A Regra do Jogo	2015-2016	Writer	
Supermax	2016	Writer	
Good Morning, Verônica	2020-2024	Showrunner	Also book author
It's All Right!	2023	Writer	
Scars of Beauty	2025	Showrunner	
Perfect Days	2025	Writer	Also book author

=== Film ===
Title	Year	Credit	Notes
Praça Paris	2018	Writer	
A Menina que Matou os Pais	2021	Writer	
O Menino que Matou Meus Pais	2021	Writer	
A Menina Que Matou os Pais: A Confissão	2023	Writer	
Uma Família Feliz	2024	Writer	Also book author
Elize: Shadows of a Woman	2026	Writer	
