= Elize: Shadows of a Woman =

2026 Brazilian film by Felipe Vellas

- Brazilian Portuguese: Elize: Sombras de uma Mulher
- Directed by: Felipe Vellas
- Written by: Raphael Montes; Mariana Torres
- Based on: Murder of Marcos Matsunaga
- Produced by: Gustavo Mello
- Starring: Lorena Comparato; Henrique Kimura; Denise Weinberg; Miwa Yanagizawa; Julia Konrad
- Cinematography: Lícia Arosteguy
- Edited by: Livia Arbex; Moema Pombo
- Production company: Boutique Filmes
- Distributed by: Netflix
- Release date: July 22, 2026
- Running time: 93 minutes
- Country: Brazil
- Language: Portuguese

Elize: Shadows of a Woman (Portuguese: Elize: Sombras de uma Mulher) is a 2026 Brazilian true crime film directed by Felipe Vellas and written by Raphael Montes and Mariana Torres. The film stars Lorena Comparato as Elize Matsunaga, alongside Henrique Kimura as Marcos Kitano Matsunaga. The ensemble supporting cast includes, Denise Weinberg, Miwa Yanagizawa, Julia Shimura and Gustavo Falcão in supporting roles. Based on the 2012 Murder of Marcos Matsunaga, it dramatizes the events leading up to the crime through a fictionalized account of Elize Matsunaga's life and marriage.

Elize: Shadows of a Woman was released on Netflix on 22 July 2026.

== Premise ==
Inspired by real events, the film follows Elize Matsunaga, a woman whose marriage to wealthy São Paulo businessman Marcos Kitano Matsunaga (Note: 'History of Crime Elize Matsunaga': the woman who killed and dismembered her husband Marcos Matsunaga, Yoki's heir) is marked by conflict, abuse and hidden secrets. As tensions rise and the violence between them intensifies, the story traces the events and decisions that lead to Marcos's murder in 2012, while exploring the psychological complexities surrounding one of Brazil's most high-profile criminal cases.

== Cast ==
- Lorena Comparato as Elize Araújo Kitano Matsunaga
- Henrique Kimura as Marcos Kitano Matsunaga
- Miwa Yanagizawa as Masuyo Kitano, Marcos' mother.
- Edson Kameda as Takashi Matsunaga, Marcos' father
- Júlia Shimura as Clarice, Marcos' cousin
- Arthur Toyoshima as Carlos Matsunaga, Marcos' brother.
- Érica Montanheiro as Dilta Ramos Araújo, Elize's mother.
- Marat Descartes as Elize's abusive stepfather.
- Denise Weinberg as Aunt Marta, Elize's kind aunt.
- Gustavo Falcão as Heitor, Marcos' best friend.
- Julia Konrad as Lari/Bianca, a friend from Elize's past.
- Anajú Dorigon as Danielle
- Flora Sandyá as the nanny of Elize and Marcos' daughter.

== Production ==
Production of Elize: Shadows of a Woman was first announced by Netflix on 29 July 2025, alongside the release of a first-look image of Lorena Comparato as Elize Matsunaga. Loosely based on the 2012 Murder of Marcos Matsunaga. It was written by Raphael Montes and Mariana Torres, who also served as producers alongside Felipe Vellas, who directed the film. While talking about the film, Montes stated, "It's not just a film about a crime," noting that they wanted to look at the factors that drove Elize Matsunaga to commit the murder, instead of concentrating only on the act itself. Henrique Kimura portrayed Marcos Matsunaga. The supporting cast includes Denise Weinberg, Miwa Yanagizawa and Julia Shimura. According to the filmmakers, the film was conceived as a psychological drama that focuses on the relationship between Elize and Marcos Matsunaga.

== Release ==
Elize: Shadows of a Woman was released by Boutique Filmes, and distributed by Netflix, It premiered on July 22, 2026.

== Reception ==
Karina Adelgaard of Heaven of Horror rated the film with 3 out of 5 stars and called it an efficient psychological thriller providing a fictionalized version of the Elize Matsunaga case. Adelgaard commended Lorena Comparato for her acting skills and added that the movie allows one to look at the case from Elize's point of view, though, at the same time, it is necessary to keep in mind that the story is fictionalized. The film received a mixed reaction from James Cameron-Wilson of Film Review Daily, who described the film as an exaggerated dramatization of the Elize Matsunaga case where the whole story is narrated from Elize's point of view. Although he complimented Lorena Comparato on her dedication to the title role, he criticized the screenplay because of the characters' representation in it; he felt that the portrayal of the main relationship was not credible and that Marcos Matsunaga had been given a single-sided characterization in the film. In a similar review by Mike BC of But Why Tho who rated the film 6/10 stated that the film is centered around the motivations of Elize Matsunaga as opposed to the crime itself. BC describes the killing of Mr. Matsunaga as an ending point to the abuse she had been going through. He praised Lorena Comparato's acting, although he believed that due to the length of the film (93 minutes), the story was not fully developed, stating that the film is too focused on building the sympathy for Elize and her suffering after the murder.

Jonathon Wilson of Ready Steady Cut, noted that the film was limited due to the comparisons to Netflix's documentary series Elize Matsunaga: Once Upon a Crime. Wilson explained that the film was not able to add any new information regarding the case. He lauded Lorena Comparato's acting in the lead role and said that some scenes in the film were well-shot, but he added that the 90-minute running time of the film left most of the storyline unexplored. Greg Wheeler of The Review Geek, rated the film 6 out of 10, describing it is an effective drama but one that could hardly make itself different from a Netflix documentary series Elize Matsunaga: Once Upon a Crime.
