= Good Morning, Verônica =

Brazilian psychological thriller television series

- Portuguese: Bom Dia, Verônica
- Genre: Crime drama; Mystery; Thriller
- Created by: Raphael Montes
- Based on: Bom Dia, Verônica by: Raphael Montes; Ilana Casoy
- Written by: Raphael Montes; Ilana Casoy; Gustavo Bragança; Davi Kolb; Carol Garcia
- Directed by: José Henrique Fonseca; Izabel Jaguaribe; Rog de Souza
- Starring: Tainá Müller; Eduardo Moscovis; Camila Morgado; Elisa Volpatto; Silvio Guindane; César Mello; Adriano Garib; Antônio Grassi
- Composers: Dado Villa-Lobos; Roberto Schilling
- Country of origin: Brazil
- Original language: Portuguese
- No. of seasons: 3
- No. of episodes: 17

Production
- Executive producers: José Henrique Fonseca; Eduardo Pop; Ilana Casoy; Raphael Montes
- Production location: São Paulo
- Editors: Yan Motta; Tainá Diniz; Sergio Mekler
- Running time: 41–61 minutes
- Production company: Zola Filmes

Original release
- Network: Netflix
- Release: October 1, 2020 – February 14, 2024

Good Morning, Verônica is a Brazilian television series that premiered on October 1, 2020, on Netflix, and was adapted from the novel of the same name by Raphael Montes. The series was created by Montes alongside Ilana Casoy under the pseudonym Andrea Killmore, and is directed by José Henrique Fonseca.

Starring Tainá Müller, Eduardo Moscovis and Camila Morgado, the series follows the story of Veronica Torres, a married police clerk with two children. Her routine is interrupted when she witnesses a young woman's shocking suicide the same week she receives an anonymous call from a female desperately requesting for help.

On November 10, 2020, Netflix renewed the series for its second season, that premiered on August 3, 2022.

On March 10, 2023, it was announced that the series was renewed for a third and final season. The third season premiered on February 14, 2024 on Netflix.

== Cast and characters ==
=== Main ===
- Tainá Müller as Verônica "Vero" Torres / Janete Cruz
- Camila Morgado as Janete Cruz (season 1)
- Eduardo Moscovis as Claúdio Antunes Brandão (season 1)
- Antônio Grassi as Wilson Carvana (season 1)
- Elisa Volpatto as Anita Berlinger (season 1–2)
- Silvio Guindane as Nelson Moralles (season 1–2)
- Adriano Garib as Victor Prata
- César Mello as Paulo Torres
- DJ Amorim as Rafael Torres
- Alice Valverde as Lila Torres
- Reynaldo Gianecchini as Matias Cordeiro (season 2–3)
- Klara Castanho as Ângela Cordeiro (season 2–3)
- Camila Márdila as Gisele Cordeiro (season 2–3)
- Ester Dias as Glória Volpi (season 2–3)
- Rodrigo Santoro as Jerônimo Soares (season 3)
- Maitê Proença as Diana (season 3)

=== Recurring ===
- Johnnas Oliva as Lima (season 1–2)
- José Rubens Chachá as Carlos Alberto (season 1–2)
- Cássio Pandolfi as Júlio Torres (season 1–2)
- Marina Provenzzano as Janice Cruz (season 1–2)
- Aline Borges as Tânia Costa de Menezes (season 1)
- Liza Del Dala as Carol (season 2–3)
- Isabelle Nassar as Olga (season 2)
- Pedro Nercessian as Davi Prata (season 2)
- Rhaisa Batista as Melina (season 3)
- Bella Camero as Laís Camargo (season 3)

=== Guest ===
- Pally Siqueira as Deusdete "Deusa" Camargo da Silva (season 1)
- Sacha Bali as Gregório Duarte (season 1)
- Julia Ianina as Marta Campos (season 1)
- Charles Paraventi as Jorge
- Rosa Piscioneri as Reginaa
- Renan Duran as Lucca
- Maria Luisa Sá as Edimara
- Roberta Santiago as Eneida Lima
- Vanja Freitas as Maria
- Juliana Lohmann as Paloma
- Raissa Xavier as Jéssica (season 1)
- Rosa Maria Colyn as Rosa
- Rose Germano as Neumira
- Erick Vesch as Jeferson
- Lucélia Pontes as Cícera
- Araci Breckenfeld as Diana
- Robson Santos as Maciel
- Alexandre Colman as Young Cláudio (season 1)

== Episodes ==
=== Series overview ===
Season	Episodes	Originally released
1	8	October 1, 2020
2	6	August 3, 2022
3	3	February 14, 2024

=== Season 1 (2020) ===
No. overall	No. in season	Title	Directed by	Written by	Original release date
1	1	"Good Morning, Verônica"	José Henrique Fonseca, Izabel Jaquaribe & Rog de Souza	Raphael Montes & Ilana Casoy	October 1, 2020
2	2	"Inside the Box"	José Henrique Fonseca, Izabel Jaquaribe & Rog de Souza	Carol Garcia & Davi Kolb	October 1, 2020
3	3	"An Unexpected Visit"	José Henrique Fonseca, Izabel Jaquaribe & Rog de Souza	Raphael Montes	October 1, 2020
4	4	"Ciao, Principessa"	José Henrique Fonseca, Izabel Jaquaribe & Rog de Souza	Gustavo Bragança	October 1, 2020
5	5	"Outside the Box"	José Henrique Fonseca, Izabel Jaquaribe & Rog de Souza	Ilana Casoy	October 1, 2020
6	6	"The Cage"	José Henrique Fonseca, Izabel Jaquaribe & Rog de Souza	Carol Garcia & Davi Kolb	October 1, 2020
7	7	"Fly, Little Bird"	José Henrique Fonseca, Izabel Jaquaribe & Rog de Souza	Gustavo Bragança & Ilana Casoy	October 1, 2020
8	8	"The Woman Who Knew Too Much"	José Henrique Fonseca, Izabel Jaquaribe & Rog de Souza	Raphael Montes	October 1, 2020

=== Season 2 (2022) ===
No. overall	No. in season	Title	Directed by	Written by	Original release date
9	1	"Winning and Losing"	Unknown	Unknown	August 3, 2022
10	2	"A Wolf in Sheep's Clothing"	Unknown	Unknown	August 3, 2022
11	3	"Between Heaven and Hell"	Unknown	Unknown	August 3, 2022
12	4	"Truth or Dare"	Unknown	Unknown	August 3, 2022
13	5	"The Silence of the Innocent"	Unknown	Unknown	August 3, 2022
14	6	"Doúm"	Unknown	Unknown	August 3, 2022

=== Season 3 (2024) ===
No. overall	No. in season	Title	Directed by	Written by	Original release date
15	1	"Who is Doúm?"	Unknown	Unknown	February 14, 2024
16	2	"A Mother's Heart"	Unknown	Unknown	February 14, 2024
17	3	"Good Night, Verônica"	Unknown	Unknown	February 14, 2024
