= Samantha! =

Brazilian comedy series

- Promotional poster
- Genre: Sitcom
- Created by: Felipe Braga
- Written by: Roberto Vitorino; Patricia Corso; Rafael Lessa; Filipe Valerim
- Directed by: Luis Pinheiro; Julia Jordão
- Starring: Emanuelle Araújo; Douglas Silva; Sabrina Nonato; Cauã Gonçalves
- Country of origin: Brazil
- Original language: Portuguese
- No. of seasons: 2
- No. of episodes: 14

Production
- Executive producers: Rita Moraes; Felipe Braga; Alice Braga
- Production location: São Paulo
- Camera setup: Single camera
- Running time: 24-37 minutes
- Production company: Losbragas

Original release
- Network: Netflix
- Release: July 6, 2018 – April 19, 2019

Samantha! is a Brazilian comedy television series. It is the first Brazilian comedy produced by Netflix and the third Netflix series produced in Brazil, after 3% and O Mecanismo. The first season was released on July 6, 2018. It is directed by Luis Pinheiros and Julia Jordão, and scripted by Roberto Vitorino, Patricia Corso, Rafael Lessa and Filipe Valerim. The series follows Samantha, a former child star who had her own TV show and led the children's musical group Turminha Plimplom in the 1980s, and now schemes to launch herself back into the spotlight.

Netflix confirmed the production of the series in February 2017, during a press conference given by its founder. Its official teaser was released in June 2018, announcing its debut for the 6 of July of the same year. Months earlier, the service confirmed the production of season two which premiered on April 19, 2019.

On March 4, 2020, the series was canceled by Netflix.

== Cast ==
=== Main ===
- Emanuelle Araújo as Samantha Alencar
- Douglas Silva as Douglas "Dodói" Alencar
- Sabrina Nonato as Cindy Alencar
- Cauã Gonçalves as Brandon Alencar
- Daniel Furlan as Marcinho

=== Recurring ===
- Duda Gonçalves as Samantha (young)
- Ary França as Zé Cigarrinho
- Lorena Comparato as Laila
- Rodrigo Pandolfo as Tico
- Maurício Xavier as Bolota
- Zezeh Barbosa as Socorro Matias (season 2)
- Alessandra Maestrini as Carmem Vecino (season 2)

=== Special guest ===
- Alice Braga as Symantha
- Alessandra Negrini as Liliane / Mushroom girl
- Maurício Xavier as Bolota (young)
- Enzo Oviedo as Tico (young)
- Jean Pierre Noher as Pablo Anton
- Rosaly Papadopol as Norminha
- Luciana Vendramini as Lenny K
- Giovanna Chaves as Valentina Vitória
- Paulo Tiefenthaler as Flávio Junior

== Episodes ==
| Season | Episodes | Originally released |
|---|---|---|
| 1 | 7 | July 6, 2018 |
| 2 | 7 | April 19, 2019 |

=== Season 1 (2018) ===
| No. overall | No. in season | Title | Directed by | Written by | Original release date |
|---|---|---|---|---|---|
| 1 | 1 | "Episode 1" | Luis Pinheiro | Roberto Vitorino | July 6, 2018 |
When Samantha's ex Dodói returns from prison and tries to prove he's a responsible parent, she realizes her career could benefit from his homecoming.
| 2 | 2 | "Episode 2" | Luis Pinheiro | Roberto Vitorino | July 6, 2018 |
Samantha and Dodói shoot a beer commercial together, but the script's storyline proves challenging for both of them in different ways.
| 3 | 3 | "Episode 3" | Luis Pinheiro | Roberto Vitorino | July 6, 2018 |
Brandon tries to whip his father into shape, Samantha guest-stars as a judge on a singing competition show, and Cindy surprises her entire family.
| 4 | 4 | "Episode 4" | Luis Pinheiro | Roberto Vitorino | July 6, 2018 |
Dodói unknowingly hooks up with social media celebrity Laila. Samantha attempts to gain Instagram followers by taking a trip to "Paris."
| 5 | 5 | "Episode 5" | Luis Pinheiro | Roberto Vitorino | July 6, 2018 |
When Samantha gets pulled into a reality show romance, her entire family is affected. Dodói tests out a career as a sports commentator on the radio.
| 6 | 6 | "Episode 6" | Luis Pinheiro | Roberto Vitorino | July 6, 2018 |
To turn her bad karma around, Samantha sets out to honor Ciggy's last request: that the Plimplom Gang reunite and spread his ashes in Varre-Sai.
| 7 | 7 | "Episode 7" | Luis Pinheiro | Roberto Vitorino | July 6, 2018 |
A face from the Plimploms' past returns to drop a bombshell on Samantha. Left at home without adult supervision, Cindy and Brandon get into trouble.

=== Season 2 (2019) ===
| No. overall | No. in season | Title | Directed by | Written by | Original release date |
|---|---|---|---|---|---|
| 8 | 1 | "Episode 1" | Luis Pinheiro | Roberto Vitorino | April 19, 2019 |
When Samantha's ex-bandmates adapt a tell-all book about her into a movie that publicly denounces her as immature, she sets out to prove them wrong.
| 9 | 2 | "Episode 2" | Luis Pinheiro | Roberto Vitorino | April 19, 2019 |
Dodói spends the day trying to please his mother. Samantha decides to take a break from the media as Tico and Porky cast an actress to play her.
| 10 | 3 | "Episode 3" | Luis Pinheiro | Roberto Vitorino | April 19, 2019 |
Samantha tries out feminism, much to Cindy's dismay. Dodói goes to therapy. Brandon's grandmother persuades him to test out a new passion.
| 11 | 4 | "Episode 4" | Luis Pinheiro | Roberto Vitorino | April 19, 2019 |
In an attempt to win over an experimental theater director, Samantha attends a party with Dodói, who draws attention. Laila offers Cindy love advice.
| 12 | 5 | "Episode 5" | Luis Pinheiro | Roberto Vitorino | April 19, 2019 |
Carmen struggles to elicit feelings from Samantha, and even resorts to using a straitjacket, as the child star tries to suppress her emotional past.
| 13 | 6 | "Episode 6" | Luis Pinheiro | Roberto Vitorino | April 19, 2019 |
When Samantha is unable to say the word "orphan", she enlists a specialist to help her mentally return to a pivotal moment in her career.
| 14 | 7 | "Episode 7" | Luis Pinheiro | Roberto Vitorino | April 19, 2019 |
Following Samantha's somber one-person play, an eager fan kidnaps the actress in order to try to convince her to be happy and optimistic again.

== Reception ==
=== Critical response ===
Writing to the Cine Pop website, Rafaela Gomes praised Samantha!, giving the series a 4-star rating of 5: "Samantha! Brings with her a rich humor for her authentic contextualizations, playing with the mannerisms of both eras, placing us as spectators who observe these outside universes, and even be able to signal the ridiculous aspects with which we have become accustomed by virtue of familiarization." However, she adds that her first three episodes "stagger", with the series proving to be more interesting in the ensuing episodes, for its symbolic veracity created between the 80's and 2010.

Doktor Bruce of Freak Pop, said that the series "it's simply ingenious", and considers it one of the best Brazilian comedies, addressing the absurdities that occurred on Brazilian TV in the 80's, and that it seeks current elements about those people who try to remain in the media at all costs.
