= The Heart of the Earth =

2007 historical drama film

- Spanish theatrical release poster
- Spanish: El corazón de la tierra
- Directed by: Antonio Cuadri
- Screenplay by: Antonio Cuadri; Shelley Miller; Doc Comparato
- Based on: El corazón de la tierra by Juan Cobos Wilkins
- Starring: Catalina Sandino Moreno; Sienna Guillory; Philip Winchester; Bernard Hill; Joaquim de Almeida; Jorge Perugorría; Ana Fernández
- Cinematography: Javier Salmones
- Edited by: Mercedes Cantero
- Music by: Fernando Ortí Salvador
- Production companies: Manufacturas Audiovisuales; Future Films; Costa do Castelo
- Distributed by: Zeta Audiovisual
- Release dates: March 2007 (Miami); 13 April 2007 (Spain)
- Countries: Spain; United Kingdom; Portugal
- Language: Spanish

The Heart of the Earth (Spanish: El corazón de la tierra) is a 2007 historical drama film directed by Antonio Cuadri from a screenplay he wrote with Shelley Miller, and Doc Comparato, based on the novel of the same name by Juan Cobos Wilkins. It is a Spanish-British-Portuguese co-production. Its cast features Catalina Sandino Moreno, Sienna Guillory, Philip Winchester, Bernard Hill, Joaquim de Almeida, Jorge Perugorría, and Ana Fernández, among others.

== Plot ==
The plot is set against the backdrop of the February 1888 miners' protest in the Spanish province of Huelva stirred by Cuban anarchist revolutionary Maximiliano Tornet, which was bloodily repressed by the Spanish Army, and the miners' deplorable working conditions in the Río Tinto copper mines under British employees, following the plight of Blanca (a teacher) and her friend Kathleen Crown, the daughter of the tyrannical manager of the mines, fifteen years after the events.

== Cast ==
- Catalina Sandino Moreno as Blanca Bosco
- Sienna Guillory as Kathleen
- Philip Winchester as Robert
- Bernard Hill as Mr. Crown
- Joaquim de Almeida as Baxter
- Ana Fernández as Mercedes
- Jorge Perugorría as alcalde ('Mayor')
- Fernando Ramallo as Carlos
- Juan Fernández as Nazario Infante
- Pablo Durán as Maximiliano Tornet
- Elvira de Armiñán as Blanca Bosco (child)

== Release ==
The film premiered at the Miami Film Festival in March 2007. It received a pre-screening in Riotinto and Seville on 10 April 2007. Distributed by Zeta Audiovisual, it was released theatrically in Spain on 13 April 2007.

== Production ==
The Heart of the Earth is a Spanish-British-Portuguese co-production by Manufacturas Audiovisuales, Future Films, and Costa do Castelo, with the participation of Canal Sur, TV3, ETB, IC, IB3, TeleMadrid, Canal 9, and Canal+. It boasted a €12.5 million budget. Shooting locations included Linares de la Sierra, Minas de Riotinto, Trigueros, Portimão, and Madrid.

== Reception ==
Jonathan Holland of Variety wrote that despite the "superb" concept involving the tragic, real-life 19th-century suppression of the miners rebellion, "the script rushes through the historical facts in the first half-hour and then becomes far-fetched in its invented stretches".

Javier Ocaña of El País assessed that despite Cuadri's "excellent camera handling" at shooting mining excavations and riots, as the film progresses, "the story becomes less and less transcendent, more and more Manichean and puerile".

== Accolades ==
Year	Award	Category	Nominee(s)	Result	Ref.
2007	11th Los Angeles Latino International Film Festival	Best Film		Won	
2008	22nd Goya Awards	Best Special Effects	Reyes Abades, Álex G. Ortoll	Nominated	
2008	22nd Goya Awards	Best Makeup and Hairstyles	José Quetglás, Blanca Sánchez	Nominated	

== See also ==
- List of Spanish films of 2007
