= Bianca Comparato =

Brazilian actress (born 1985)

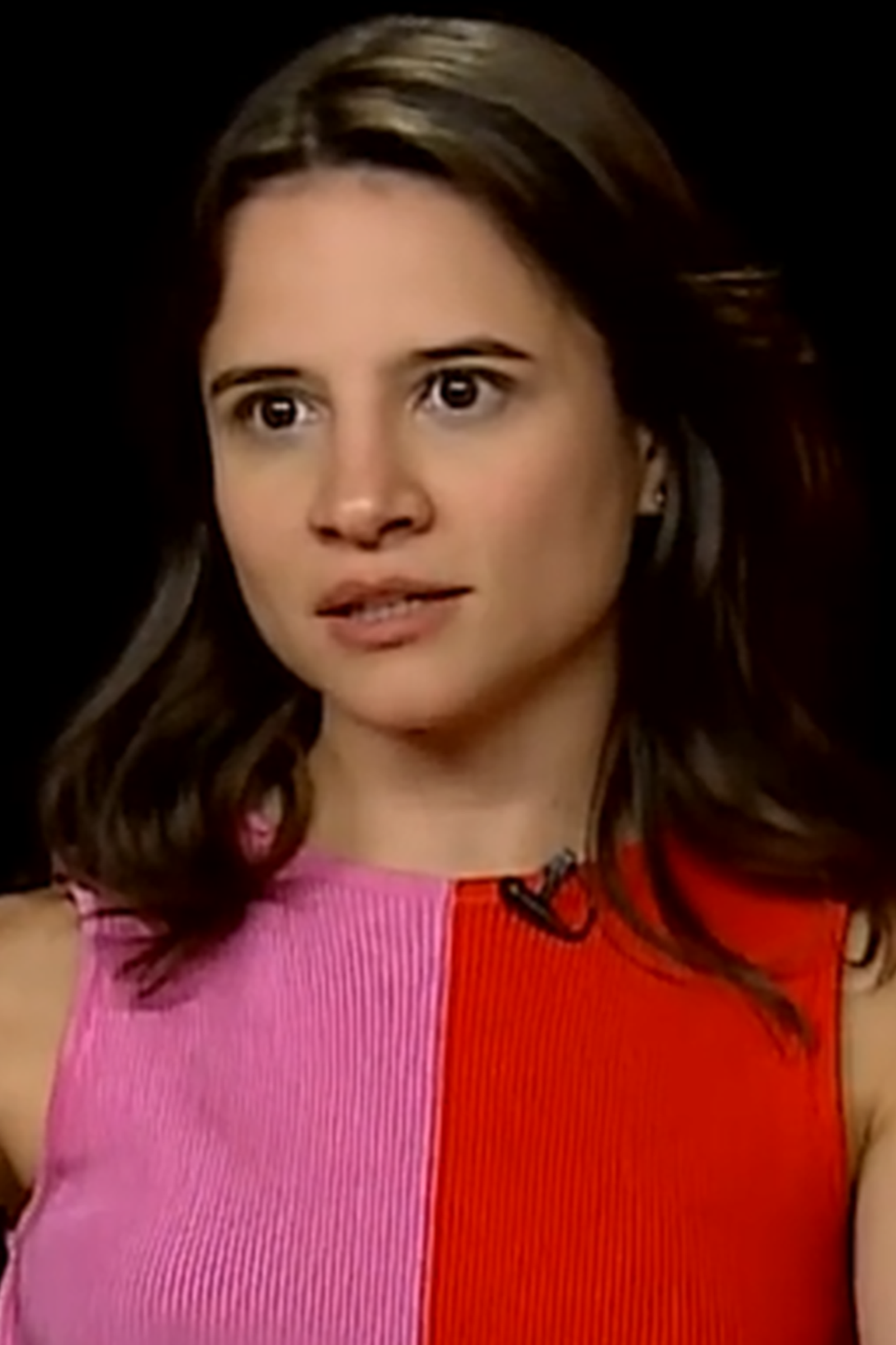
- Comparato in 2016
- Born: Bianca de Souza Mendes Comparato; 19 November 1985 (age 40); Rio de Janeiro, Brazil
- Education: Pontifical Catholic University of Rio de Janeiro
- Occupation: Actress
- Years active: 2003–present
- Partner: Alice Braga (2017–2023)
- Parent: Doc Comparato (father)
- Relatives: Lorena Comparato (younger sister)

Bianca de Souza Mendes Comparato (born 19 November 1985) is a Brazilian actress. She starred in Como Esquecer (2010), as well as A Menina sem Qualidades and Somos tão Jovens (both in 2013), the latter of which earned her the Grande Prêmio do Cinema Brasileiro for Best Supporting Actress for her role as Carmem Teresa. In 2016, she gained international recognition for her starring role as Michele in the Netflix original series 3%.

== Early life ==
Comparato was born in Rio de Janeiro, the daughter of the writer Doc Comparato and older sister of actress and presenter Lorena Comparato. She is of Portuguese and Italian descent. At age 16, Comparato attended a three-month course at the Royal Academy of Dramatic Arts in London, as a prize given by the British School of Rio de Janeiro, for standing out in the theatre course. She returned to Brazil determined to quit school to devote herself to her artistic career, but was dissuaded by her parents. Along with the regular school, Comparato attended courses on body language and drama. In 2010 she graduated from the film school at the Pontifical Catholic University of Rio de Janeiro.

== Career ==
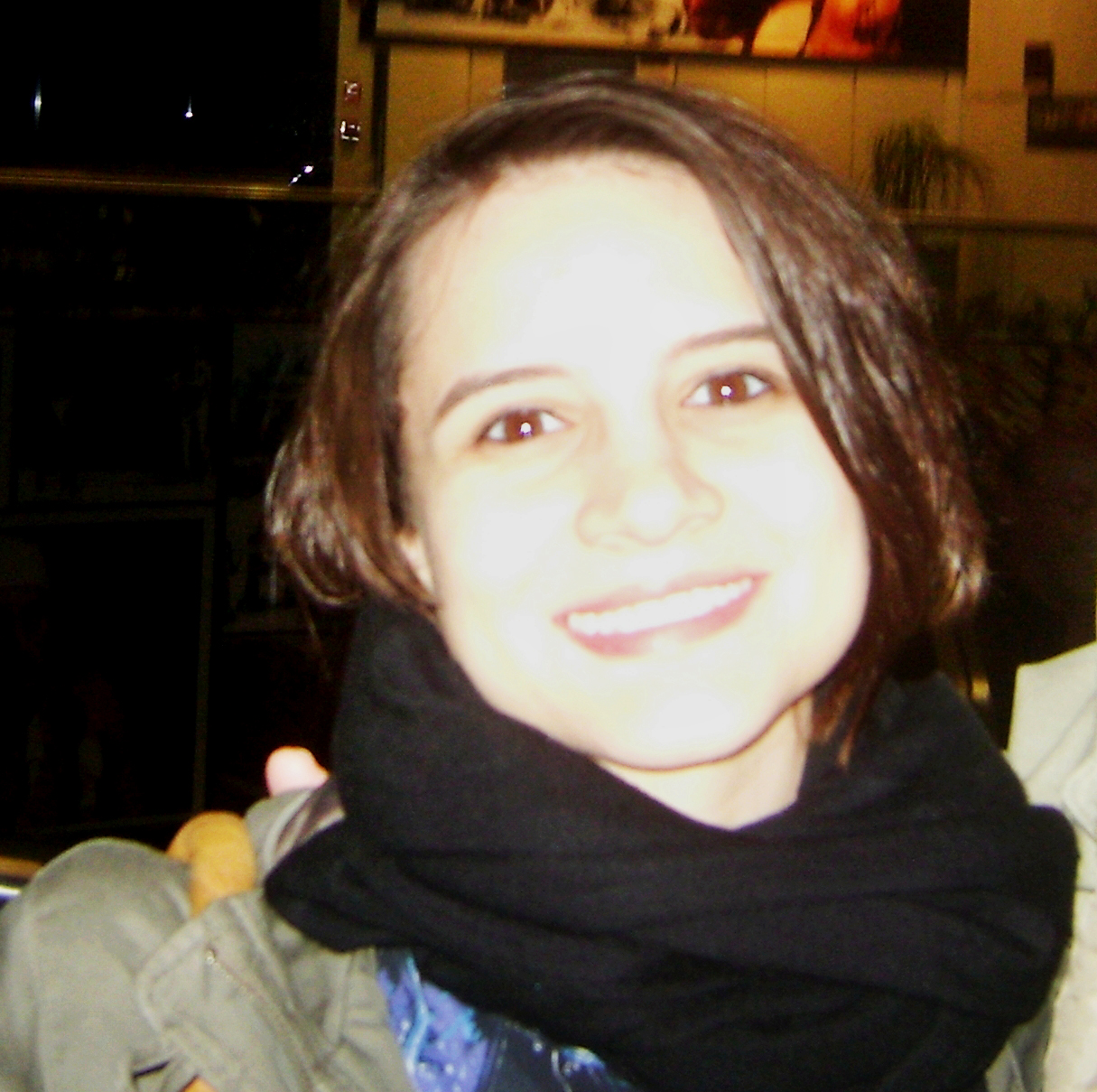
Comparato in 2011

Comparato's first theatrical performance was in O Ateneu, directed by Leonardo Bricio. She debuted on television in 2004, participating in the series Carga Pesada. Later that year, she made a cameo appearance in Senhora do Destino.

In 2005, she played Maria João in Belíssima, a girl who lived through war with her sister Giovanna, played by Paolla Oliveira. She then made an appearance in Cobras & Lagartos in 2006. The same year she starred in the short film Pedro, Ana e a Verdade, appeared in the film Anjos do Sol and posed for the "Women We Love" feature in Playboy Brazil.

In 2007, Comparato appeared in the series Toma Lá, Dá Cá and Antônia, based on the film of the same name, the miniseries Amazônia, de Galvez a Chico Mendes, and the play Últimos Remorsos Antes do Esquecimento. In 2008, she joined the Beleza Pura cast of TV Globo and also premiered the play A Fruta e a Casca, inspired by the story of Dom Casmurro.

The following year in 2009, she performed the play Rock'n'Roll and the cast of the television series Aline from the first season onwards, in which she, as Kelly, lived with her modern best friend Aline.

In 2010, Comparato was in the feature film starring Como Esquecer How Ana Paula Arósio. In the same year, she acted in the play Mordendo os Lábios, written and directed by Hamilton Vaz Pereira. In 2011, she participated in two episodes of Tapas & Beijos, enacts the stage show A Escola do Escândalo and also made a cameo on the soap opera A Vida da Gente.

In 2012 she participated in the episode "A Culpada de BH" in the series As Brasileiras, will be on the soap opera Avenida Brasil of João Emanuel Carneiro, in the novel she interprets the attendant Betânia.

In 2013, Comparato appeared in Somos tão Jovens, a biographical work on the singer Renato Russo. She won the Grande Prêmio do Cinema Brasileiro Best Supporting Actress award for her performance. In the same year she returned to television with the series A Menina Sem Qualidades, MTV Brasil's first foray in the field of television drama. She was also in Season 2 of the series Sessão de Terapia.

In 2019, she directed the documentary Elogio da Liberdade, about the feminist writer Rosiska Darcy de Oliveira.

== Personal life ==
Comparato was in a relationship with actress Alice Braga from 2017 - 2023.

== Filmography ==
Television
Year	Títle	Role	Notes
2004	Carga Pesada		Cameo
2004	Senhora do Destino	Helen	Cameo
2005	Cilada		eps: "Shopping", "Natal"
2005	Belíssima	Maria João Güney de Oliveira	
2006	Por Toda Minha Vida	Elis Regina (teenage)	ep: "Elis Regina"
2006	Cobras & Lagartos	Rosimary	Cameo
2007	Amazônia, de Galvez a Chico Mendes	Celinha	
2007	Antônia	Mariah	ep: "Plano B"
2007	Toma Lá, Dá Cá	Gelda	ep: "O 'Y' do Problema"
2008	Beleza Pura	Luisa	
2008	Episódio Especial	Herself	Cameo
2009	Aline	Kelly	Season 1
2011	Aline	Kelly	Season 2
2011	Tapas & Beijos	Carol	Cameo
2011	O Astro	Laura friend	Cameo
2011	A Vida da Gente	Nina	Cameo
2012	As Brasileiras	Natasha	ep: "A Culpada de BH"
2012	Avenida Brasil	Betânia / false Rita	
2013	A Menina Sem Qualidades	Ana	
2013	Sessão de Terapia	Carol Martins	
2015	Sete Vidas	Diana	
2016–2020	3%	Michele	
2024	Grey's Anatomy	Maria-Flor Vasconcellos	ep: "A Walk on the Ocean"
2025	Tremembé	Anna Carolina Jatobá	Documentary series

Film
Year	Títle	Role	Notes
2006	Pedro, Ana e a Verdade		Short Film
2006	Anjos do Sol	Inês	
2010	Como Esquecer	Carmem Lygia	
2013	Somos Tão Jovens	Carmem Teresa	
2015	Happily Married	Alice	
2017	Todas as razões para esquecer		
2019	Elogio da Liberdade	Director	Documentary
2024	In Our Blood	Beth Kozlov	
