= Rosiska Darcy de Oliveira =

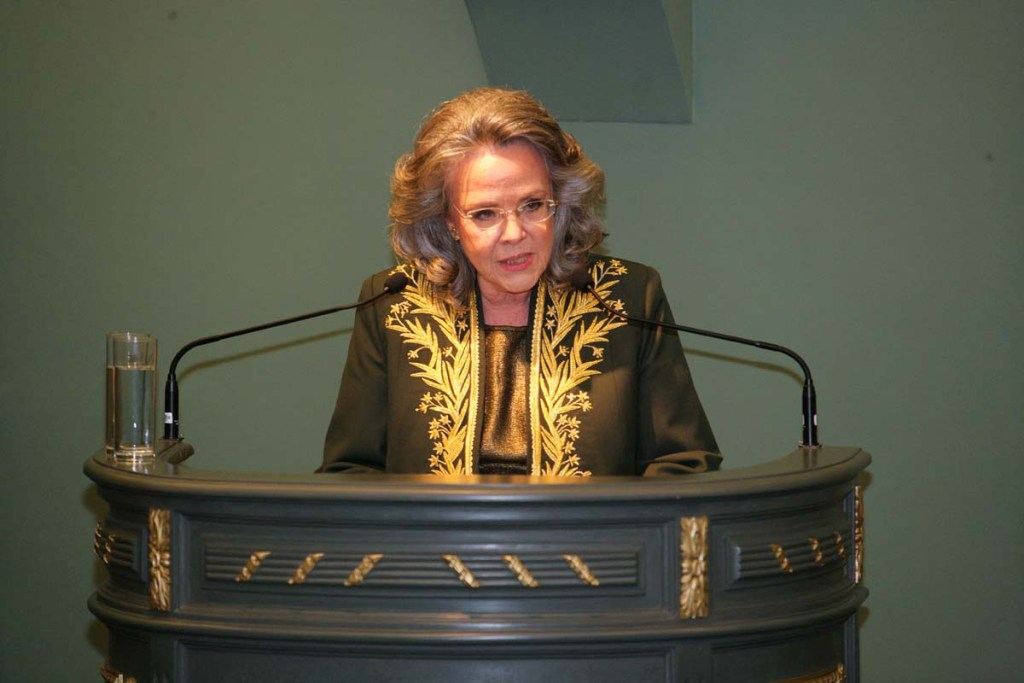
- Born: March 27, 1944 (age 82) Rio de Janeiro
- Occupation: journalist, writer, academic

Rosiska Darcy de Oliveira (born March 27, 1944) is a Brazilian journalist, writer and academic. Her works mainly deal with topics such as feminism, education and contemporary life. She was also a staunch opponent of the dictatorship in the country, established by the 1964 coup d'état.

She is a member of the Brazilian Academy of Letters since 2013.

== Biography ==
Rosiska Darcy de Oliveira was born in Rio de Janeiro in 1944, she studied at the Instituto de Educação and wrote for Tangará, the school's magazine. She graduated in law from the Pontifical Catholic University of Rio de Janeiro and worked as a journalist for various magazines and newspapers in the 1960s, such as Senhor, Visão, Jornal do Brasil and O Globo.

During her college years, she met Miguel Darcy de Oliveira, whom she later married. In 1969, during Brazil's military dictatorship, he began working as a diplomat and the couple left Brazil for Geneva, Switzerland. There, they wrote a report to Amnesty International and the Bertrand Russell Peace Foundation denouncing cases of torture by the regime. In February 1970, Oliveira was called back to Brazil by the regime and was imprisoned for 40 days in the Itamaraty Palace. At that time, Oliveira said she was interrogated for 12 hours at the Brazilian embassy in Switzerland, which she also denounced to international organizations. Oliveira and her husband later met again in Europe.

She was exiled in Switzerland for ten years. There, she met the educator Paulo Freire, which led to Oliveira's work in education, reinforced by her studies under Jean Piaget at the University of Geneva. In 1971, she founded the Instituto de Ação Cultural with Freire, which promoted the educational reconstruction of Portuguese-speaking African countries after their independence. She worked with the Institute in Guinea-Bissau.

She was involved in the feminist movement, publishing several essays on women in society and teaching at the University of Geneva - where she obtained her doctorate. She returned to Brazil in 1983 and became an advisor to the deputy governor of Rio de Janeiro, Darcy Ribeiro, for four years. In 1991, she founded and was chairwoman of the Coalition of Brazilian Women and was appointed president of the National Council for Women's Rights.

She co-chaired the Brazilian delegation to the World Conference on Women, participated in the Women and Development Council of the Inter-American Development Bank and represented Brazil on the Inter-American Commission of Women of the Organization of American States. She defended the creation and was the first president of the Specialized Meeting of Women in Mercosur. She has participated in UN and UNESCO projects.

Between 2007 and 2015, she directed the Rio Como Vamos movement, an organization focused on social and urban improvement in Rio de Janeiro.

On 11 April 2013 she was elected to the chair nº10 of the Brazilian Academy of Letters, succeeding Ledo Ivo.

She is the subject of the 2015 documentary Elogio da Liberdade (In Praise of Freedom), directed by Bianca Comparato.

== Selected works ==
- A Libertação da Mulher, Lisboa: Sá da Costa Editora, 1975
- Ivan Illich e Paulo Freire: A Opressão da Pedagogia e a Pedagogia dos Oprimidos, Lisboa: Sá da Costa Editora, 1977
- Vivendo e Aprendendo (co-author), São Paulo: Editora Brasiliense, 1980
- Le Féminin Ambigu, Genève: Editions du Concept Moderne, 1989
- O Elogio da Diferença: o feminino emergente, São Paulo: Editora Brasiliense, 1991
- La Culture des Femmes: tradition et innovation, Paris: UNESCO, 1992
- In Praise of Difference: The Rise of Global Feminism, New Brunswick, New Jersey: Rutgers University Press, 1998
- A Dama e o Unicórnio, Rio de Janeiro: Editora Rocco, 2000
- Outono de Ouro e Sangue, Rio de Janeiro: Editora Rocco, 2002
- Reengenharia do Tempo, Rio de Janeiro: Editora Rocco, 2003
- A Natureza do Escorpião, Rio de Janeiro: Editora Rocco, 2006
- Chão de Terra, Rio de Janeiro: Editora Rocco, 2010
- Elogio da liberdade (essays), Rio de Janeiro: Editora Rocco, 2013
- Baile de máscaras (crônicas), Rio de Janeiro: Editora Rocco, 2013
- Pássaro louco, Rio de Janeiro: Editora Rocco, 2016
- Liberdade, Rio de Janeiro: Editora Rocco, 2021
