= Arieta Corrêa =

Brazilian actress (born 1977)

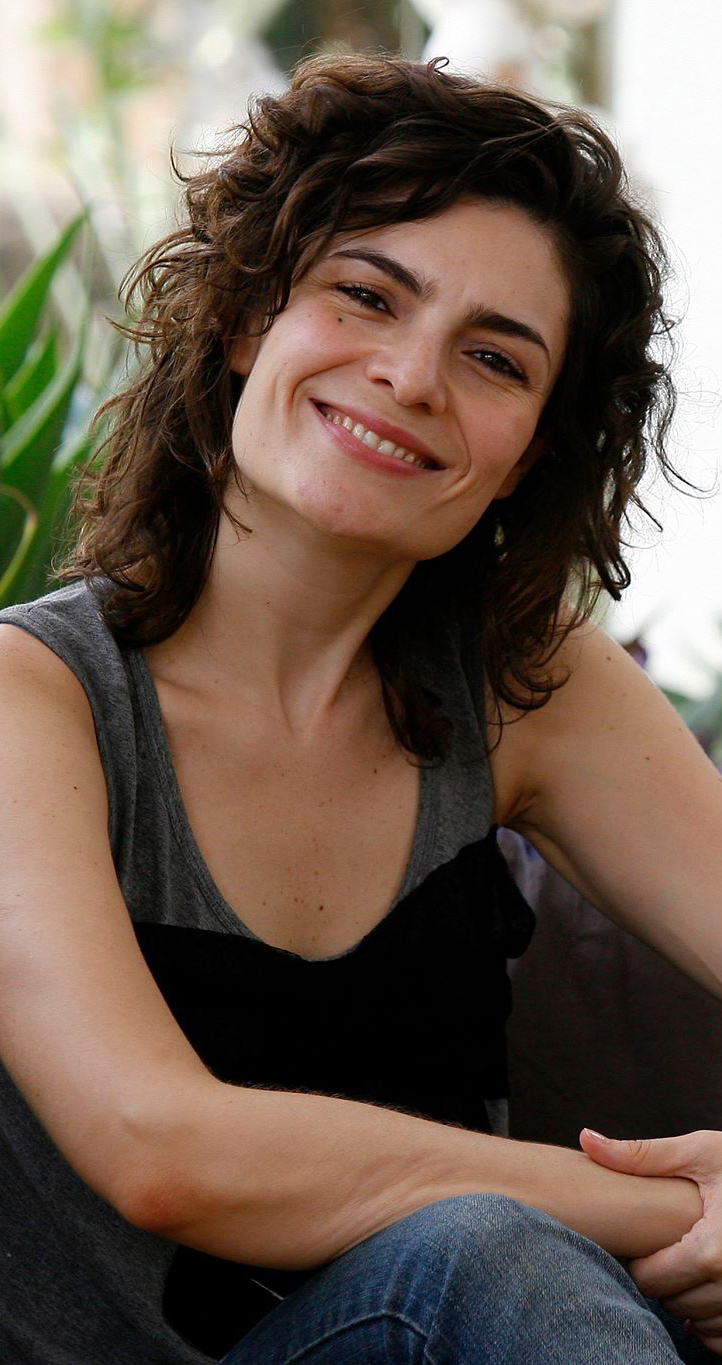
- Corrêa in 2015
- Born: Arietha Emília Salles Corrêa; 18 March 1977 (age 48); Botucatu, São Paulo, Brazil
- Other names: Arieta Correia
- Occupation: Actress
- Spouse: Rodrigo Veronese (m. 2008; div. 2009)
- Children: 1

Arietha Emília Salles Corrêa (born 18 March 1977) is a Brazilian actress.

== Biography ==
Arietha Emília Salles Corrêa, also known and credited as Arieta Corrêa was born in the city of Botucatu, interior of São Paulo.

Present in more than 20 assembly is formed by the Research Center Theatre (CPT) Son of Ali with whom he worked for six years. With Antunes Filho, Arieta starred in shows such as Medea and Prêt-à-Porter 6.

Under the direction of Philip Hirsch, Arieta was in The Miser, highly praised assembly that marked the last appearance of the scenic actor Paulo Autran.

On television, was in the novels Explode Coração and O Rei do Gado, was in the miniseries and the Labirinto and A Casa das Sete Mulheres.

In the cinema in such films as Otávio e as Letras of Marcelo Masagão, and any man Caio Vecchio.

In 2008 Arieta was on display in the play with Leonardo Medeiros Não Sobre o Amor, and returned to television to participate in one of the episodes of the show Casos e Acasos, the Globo network. The following year participated in the Tudo Novo de Novo, also shown on TV Globo. In the same year he joined the cast of Novel Viver a Vida. The following year, the actress was on the big screen in the film Como Esquecer, directed by Malu de Martino and starring Ana Paula Arósio.

In 2011 made a cameo on the soap opera Insensato Coração. Also in 2011, was in the cast of VIPs.

== Personal life ==
In December 2008, the actress married actor Rodrigo Veronese, who has a son, Gael. After three months of marriage, she and Rodrigo separated.

== Filmography ==
=== Television ===
Year	Title	Role	Notes
1995	Explode Coração	Jeannie Rocker	Credited as "Arietha Correia"
1996	O Rei do Gado	Chiquita	Credited as "Arietha Corrêa"
1997	Você Decide	Janine	Episode: "Na Sombra do Passado"
1998	Você Decide		Episode: "Ato Covarde"
1998	Você Decide	Monique	Episode: "O Escândalo"
1998	Labirinto	Rosemary	Participation
1999	Suave Veneno	Burglar	Support cast
2003	A Casa das Sete Mulheres	Bárbara	
2008	Casos e Acasos	Sara Lee	Episode: "A Vaga, a Entrevista e o Cachorro-Quente"
2009	Tudo Novo de Novo	Ruth	
2009	Viver a Vida	Laura	Episodes: "November 19, 2009–January 11, 2010"
2011	Insensato Coração	Darcy	Episodes: "May 10–17, 2011"
2011	Força-Tarefa	Dalva	Episode: "December 8, 2011"
2013	Vitrola	Maria Elise Gonçalves (Elise)	TV movie
2014	A Teia	Letícia	Participation
2019	Amor de Mãe	Leila Moreira dos Santos	
2025	Vale Tudo	Dr. Ana	Participation

=== Films ===
Year	Title	Role
2007	Otávio e as Letras	Clara
2009	Um Homem Qualquer	Clarissa
2010	Como Esquecer	Helena
2011	VIPs	Sandra
