= Ana Carolina Oliveira =

Brazilian politician (born 1984)

- Oliveira in 2025

Member-elect of the Chamber of Deputies
- Assuming office 1 February 2027
- Constituency: São Paulo

Member of the Municipal Chamber of São Paulo
- Incumbent
- Assumed office 1 January 2025
- Constituency: At-large

Personal details
- Born: Ana Carolina Cunha de Oliveira Francomano; 5 April 1984 (age 42) São Paulo, Brazil
- Party: PODE (2024–present)
- Spouse: Alexandre Nardoni (sep. 2003)
- Children: 3, including Isabella

Ana Carolina Cunha de Oliveira Francomano (born 5 April 1984) is a Brazilian politician who was elected member of the Chamber of Deputies in 2026. She has been a member of the Municipal Chamber of São Paulo since 2025. She was the biological mother of Isabella Nardoni until her death in 2008.
