= Pé na Cova =

Brazilian comedy television series

- Genre: Sitcom
- Created by: Miguel Falabella
- Written by: Alessandra Poggi, Antonia Pellegrino, Artur Xexéo, Flávio Marinho e Luiz Carlos Góes
- Directed by: Cininha de Paula
- Starring: Miguel Falabella, Marília Pêra, Lorena Comparato, Daniel Torres, Luma Costa, Mart'nália, Karin Hils e Karina Marthin
- Country of origin: Brazil
- Original language: Portuguese
- No. of seasons: 5
- No. of episodes: 71

Production
- Production location: Rio de Janeiro
- Production company: TV Globo

Original release
- Network: Rede Globo; Canal Viva
- Release: 24 January 2013 – 7 April 2016
- Release: 10 January 2019 – 19 March 2020

Related
- Toma Lá, Dá Cá; Sai de Baixo

Pé na Cova is a Brazilian television series produced by TV Globo. It was shown from 24 January 2013 to 7 April 2016, with 71 episodes and 5 seasons.

Created and written by Miguel Falabella, with scripts by Alessandra Poggi, Antonia Pellegrino, Artur Xexéo, Flávio Marinho and Luiz Carlos Góes, collaboration by Ana Quintana, final script by Miguel Falabella and Flávio Marinho, under the direction of Cris D'Amato, Hsu Chien and Cininha de Paula, general direction by Cininha de Paula and core direction by Roberto Talma.

It featured Miguel Falabella, Marília Pêra, Lorena Comparato, Daniel Torres, Luma Costa, Mart'nália, Karin Hils, and Karina Marthin in the main roles.

== Production ==
Although the apparent backdrop of the series is death, Miguel Falabella said that, in fact, its backdrop "is the great tragedy of national education." Cininha Paula noted that "death surrounds, but does not star in the series" and Falabella concluded that "in Brazil, death has a very morbid footprint and I imagined that it would be banal to make a comedy with the theme" and that is why he would try to seek a "lightness".

The author said that although the plot deals with controversial issues, the text "borders on ‘nonsense’." Cininha de Paula, the general director, described the series as a realistic comedy. The "crazy realism", as the director calls it, has diverse inspirations, ranging from the Cohen brothers to Cuban and Portuguese films. Falabella said that "Pé na Cova" is a reflective program and not just about the relationship with death, but at the same time, it is very "light".

About the central family, the author commented that they "have no money, no education, are completely crazy", as well as having "an unusual characteristic": they are "a group of people who are eccentric to the limit, who border on the absurd and survive over death", but which, according to him, does exist. Falabella also said that he thought of them as an "Addams Family from Irajá."

As the series is set in the Irajá neighborhood, Cininha de Paula went there to find the necessary references, where she acquired information about funeral services, sets, and costumes. For the latter, she also used "things from Portuguese films, because of the great influence of the Lusitanian colonies."

In the third season, which began on 8 April 2014, Marília Pêra left the series due to a health problem. On 11 June, she returned to recording the series. During the airing of the fourth season, the actress, who played the character Darlene, died on 5 December 2015. Rede Globo met with the actress's family and the cast and kept the series going even after the actress's death until the end of the last season on 7 April 2016. Despite the actress's death, she had already left one more season recorded.

=== Casting ===
The choice of Mart'nália was made by Falabella himself, who adapted the lines considering her difficulty speaking and her debut as an actress. Luma Costa, for her part, had to take tests in order to play Odete Roitman. When she heard that the series needed a blonde, light-eyed actress, she signed up for the selection, which she won. Luma also took pole dancing classes to prepare for her role, which included wearing lingerie as part of her costume.

The role of Juscelino, the funerary driver, was originally going to be played by Ney Latorraca, who, however, had health problems and was hospitalized. He was then replaced by Alexandre Zacchia. However, the author has said that when the actor is fully recovered, he will be able to play another character, Doctor Zoltan, an unreliable doctor who works as a psychiatrist and surgeon. In June 2013, Ney Latorraca communicated with Falabella and decided not to join the cast, citing his intention to take more time before returning to acting, passing the character on to Diogo Vilela, who had already worked with the author on Toma Lá Dá Cá.

Actress Marília Pêra, who played the character Darlene, died on 5 December 2015. However, the series continued to be shown, because she had already left one more season recorded. Miguel Falabella contacted the actress's family so that her image could be used in the last recorded season of the series, in 2016.

== Plot ==
Set in Irajá, a suburb of Rio de Janeiro, the plot focuses on the Pereira family, headed by Gedivan Pereira, better known as Ruço (Miguel Falabella), who is dating Abigail (Lorena Comparato), an orphan girl who is thirty years younger than him, and is the owner of F.U.I. - Funerária Unidos do Irajá -, a company that is almost bankrupt due to past mismanagement and which doesn't make enough money to support everyone in the house. To help out at home, Ruço's daughter Odete (Luma Costa) works producing adult content on internet sites for subscribers and is also the girlfriend of transsexual mechanic Tamanco (Mart'nália). The patriarch's youngest son, Alessanderson (Daniel Torres), doesn't care about working and wants a career in politics, being a braggart who manages to manipulate people in the neighborhood with false promises for the future. The family is completed by Darlene (Marília Pêra), Ruço's ex-wife, who struggles with alcohol dependence, and his best friend and confidant, who works as a make-up artist for a funeral home.

The house is also home to Bá (Niana Machado), Ruço's former nanny, who struggles with memory loss, which occasionally leads to challenging situations for the family, and Adenóide (Sabrina Korgut), a maid who always has a story of tragedy and poverty to tell. The funeral home is run by the gloomy handyman Juscelino (Alexandre Zacchia), a terrible driver who regularly ends up losing a body, and is the brother of the schizophrenic Luz Divina (Eliana Rocha), a woman who resorts to schemes to obtain money for her medication. The neighborhood is also home to the mechanic Marco (Maurício Xavier), Tamanco's brother who performs as a drag queen at night, Floriano (Rubens de Araújo), a grouchy and paranoid neighbor, and the barista twins Soninja (Karin Hils) and Giussandra (Karina Marthin), who are absolutely different and run a snack cart with creative names inspired by the funeral home, such as X-túmulo (X-tomb) and caixão-quente (hot-coffin).

In the third season, Dr. Zóltan (Diogo Vilela), a plastic surgeon with OCD, joins the cast, while in the fourth, Luiziane, Odete's stripper co-worker who gets involved with Alessanderson, and Men Fu (Chao Chen), a Chinese man who has an affair with Odete but falls in love with Adenóide.

== Cast ==
=== Main roles ===
Actor	Character	Season				
Actor	Character	1st 2013	2nd 2013	3rd 2014	4th 2015	5th 2016
Miguel Falabella	Gedivan Pereira (Ruço)	Main	Main	Main	Main	Main
Marília Pêra	Darlene dos Santos	Main	Main	Guest	Main	Main
Lorena Comparato	Abigail de Jesus	Main	Main	Main	Main	Main
Daniel Torres	Alessanderson Pereira dos Santos	Main	Main	Main	Main	Main
Luma Costa	Odete Roitman Pereira dos Santos	Main	Main	Main	Main	Main
Mart'nália	Cristiane Oliveira (Tamanco)	Main	Main	Main	Main	Main
Alexandre Zacchia	Juscelino Jardim da Mata	Main	Main	Main	Main	Main
Eliana Rocha	Luz Divina Jardim da Mata	Main	Main	Main	Main	Main
Sabrina Korgut	Adenóide Cidreira Cipó	Main	Main	Main	Main	Main
Karin Hils	Soninja Torres Sampaio	Main	Main	Main		Main
Karina Marthin	Giussandra Torres Sampaio					
Maurício Xavier	Marco Antônio (Marcão / Markassa)	Main	Main	Main	Main	Main
Niana Machado	Isaura Silvino (Bá)	Main	Main	Main	Main	Main
Rubens de Araújo	Floriano	Main	Main	Main	Main	Main
Helady Araújo	Dircéia	Recurring character	Main	Main	Main	Main
Gabriel Lima	Sermancino dos Santos Pereira	Guest	Main	Main	Main	Main
Magno Bandarz	Clécio Pereira		Main	Main	Main	Main
Marcelo Picchi	Legislator Arlindo Sebonetti	Recurring character	Recurring character	Main	Main	Main
Diogo Vilela	Dr. Zóltan Davidson de Jesus			Main	Main	Main
Laura Keller	Luiziane da Silva			Recurring character	Main	Main

=== Recurrent role ===
Intérprete	Personagem	Temporadas				
Intérprete	Personagem	1ª 2013	2ª 2013	3ª 2014	4ª 2015	5ª 2016
Eline Porto	Prínces	Recurring character				
Ester Elias	Márcia Regina Sebonetti				Recurring character	
Amauri Oliveira	Falsa Soninja				Recurring character	
Maria Gladys	Drª. Elisabete Tazcanha					Recurring character

=== Special guests ===
Intérprete	Personagem
Anna Luz	Dircéia (young)
Viétia Zangrandi	Maria de Lourdes (Lurdinha)
Laura Cardoso	Mozica Pereira
Ângela Dip	Vera Lúcia Pereira
Prazeres Barbosa	Nivalda
Júlio Rocha	Marcinho Azeitona
Andrea Dantas	Veridiana
Rodrigo Rangel	Horácio Pimenteira
Bernardo Mendes	Webson
Roberto Pirillo	Jurandir
Roney Facchini	Lourival
Larissa Cunha	Conan
Waldir Gozzi	Julinho Varejeira
Alessandra Maestrini	Hérnia Lopes Delfino / Rénner
Jarbas Homem de Mello	Detective Samir Nabucha
Stella Miranda	Jandira
Zezeh Barbosa	Paulina
Bia Nunnes	Maria Isabel
Cassiano Carneiro	Haroldinho
Marcos Breda	Mariozinho
Eliseu Carvalho	Zanata
Giovanna Antonelli	Her self / Priscila
Márcia Cabrita	Felícia
Ilvio Amaral	Legislator Mr Coisinha
Ricardo Graça Mello	Garnizé
Patrícia Bueno	Amarula
Alejandro Claveaux	Pablo
Fernando Benini	Ladislau Souza
Fátima Freire	Zaíra
Débora Olivieri	Elisinha/Jurema
Fafy Siqueira	Mrs Aracy
Cosme dos Santos	Rosalro
Carlo Briani	Alcides
Osvaldo Romano	Capitain Rodrigo
Thaís Portinho	Romilda
Liza Vieira	Doralice
Andréia Sorvetão	Quarentona Toda Boa (Sexy Old Lady)
Mary Sheila	Soninja (After Liposuction)
Lana Guelero	Pastora Jurema
Chico Diaz	Damasceno
Jane di Castro	Patrícia Swanson
Lumi Kin	Heleninha Wu (adult)
Rômulo Simões	Neymã (adult)
Malu Valle	Rivalda
Bethy Lagardère	Solange / Lange Wilson
Narjara Turetta	Jacira
Camila Amado	Ivonete
Denise Milfont	Rosa
Márcio Vito	Mário
Theresa Amayo	Ruço's client
Frederico Reuter	Ruço's client
Gláucia Rodrigues	Mrs. Lady

== Seasons ==
Season	Episodes	Original Exhibition		Overall average (Note: Audiência referente a Grande São Paulo, onde cada ponto equivale a 65 mil domicílios.)
Season	Episodes	Season premiere	Season finale	Overall average
1	22	24 January 2013	20 June 2013	14
2	11 (Note: The season ended with 11 episodes, because on 19 November, a friendly match of the Brazilian national team was shown instead of the show.)	1 October 2013	17 December 2013	16
3	14	8 April 2014	8 July 2014	15
4	12	29 September 2015	29 December 2015	14
5	12	21 January 2016	7 April 2016	14

== Spin-off ==
On the program's official website, there was a web series called Lembranças do Irajá (Memories of Irajá), where the main focus was on showing the past of the central characters.

== Rebroadcast ==
From 10 January 2019, to 19 March 2020, It was rebroadcast on Canal Viva.

== Reception ==
=== Audience ===
The series premiered with an average of 17 points in São Paulo.

=== Critical evaluation ===
Columnist Nilson Xavier of the UOL website praised the show, saying: "There's nothing like black humor to play with death and prejudice by taking a debauched and amusing look at human tragedy."

== Awards and nominations ==
Year	Award	Categorie	Nomination	Result
2014	Extra Television Awards	Best Comedy		Nominated
2013	Extra Television Awards	Best Comedy		Nominated
2013	Extra Television Awards	Best Costume Design		Nominated
2013	Extra Television Awards	Best Make-Up		Nominated
2013	Extra Television Awards	Most Promising Actress	Mart'nália	Nominated

== Soundtrack ==
1. "Pé na Cova" - Mart'nália (Opening theme)
2. "Canto Para a Minha Morte" - Raul Seixas (General)
3. "Mon Amour Meu Bem Ma Famme" - Reginaldo Rossi (Abigail's theme)
4. "Eu Te Amo Meu Brasil" - Os Incríveis
5. "Lábio que Beijei" - Orlando Silva
6. "The Green Leaves Of Summer" - The Brothers Four

== See also ==
- Sai de Baixo
- Toma Lá, Dá Cá
- Vai Que Cola
