= Como Esquecer =

2010 film directed by Malu de Martino

- Brazil poster
- Directed by: Malu de Martino
- Starring: Ana Paula Arósio; Murilo Rosa; Natália Lage; Arieta Corrêa; Bianca Comparato; Pierre Baitelli
- Distributed by: Europa Filmes
- Release date: October 15, 2010
- Running time: 100 minutes
- Country: Brazil
- Language: Portuguese

Como Esquecer (English: So Hard to Forget) is a 2010 Brazilian film.

== Plot ==
Júlia (Ana Paula Arósio) is a professor of English literature who is abandoned by her girlfriend after a relationship that lasted over ten years. Because of the separation, Júlia moves to Rio de Janeiro and lives with her best friend, Hugo (Murilo Rosa), who is gay, and Lisa (Natália Lage). In the new work, Júlia ends up attracting the interest a student, and of Helena (Arieta Corrêa), a woman she meets by chance and who is after the teacher, although she does not feel prepared for a new relationship.

== Cast ==
- Ana Paula Arósio as Júlia
- Murilo Rosa as Hugo
- Natália Lage as Lisa
- Arieta Corrêa as Helena
- Bianca Comparato as Carmem Lygia
- Pierre Baitelli as Nani
- Regina Sampaio as Selma
- Marília Medina as Tutty
- Gillray Coutinho as Honorio
- Analu Prestes as Donna Laura
- Ana Kutner as Mônica
- Ana Baird as Joana
- Lia Racy as Gina
- Miriam Juvino as Claudia
