= Doc Comparato =

Brazilian writer

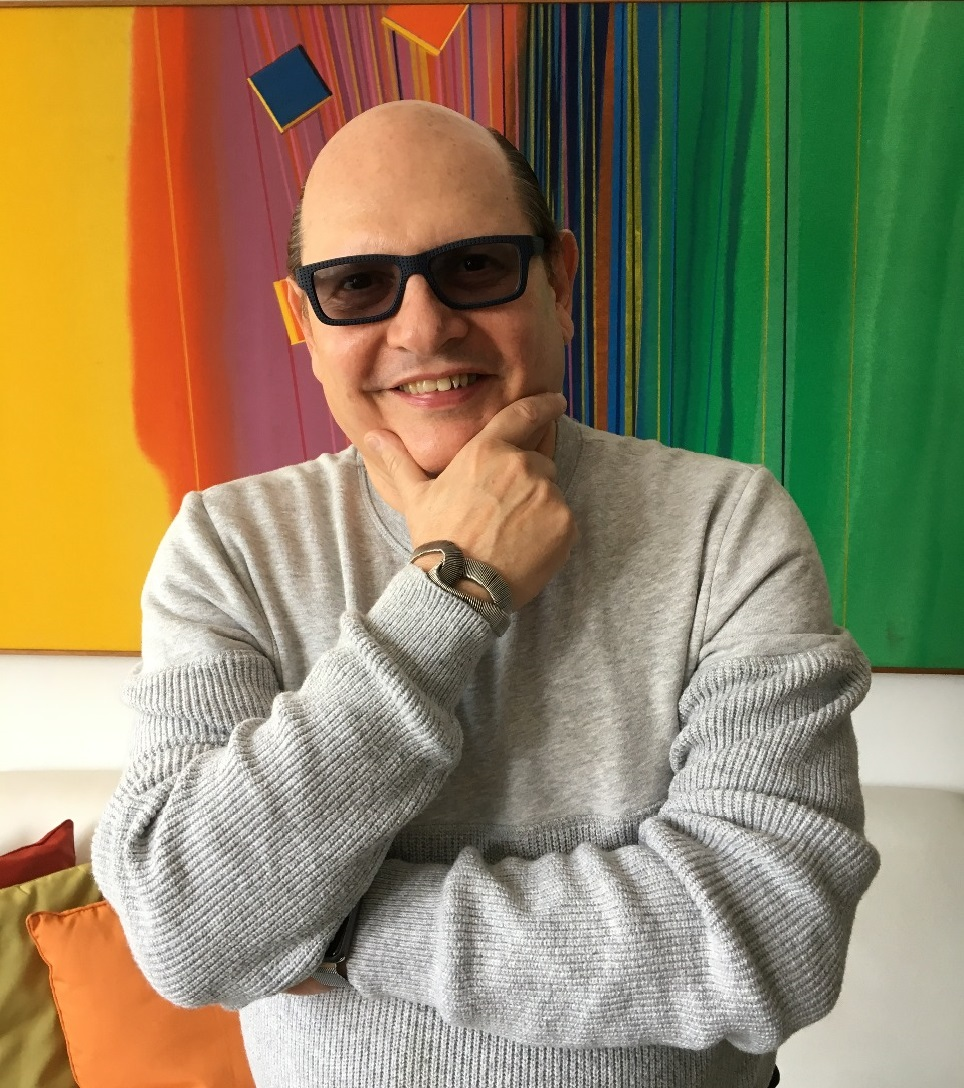
- Born: Luiz Felipe Loureiro Comparato; 3 November 1949; Rio de Janeiro, Brazil
- Occupations: Screenwriter, writer
- Spouse: Cecília Maria Neder Castro (m. 1980)
- Children: Fabiana Comparato; Bianca Comparato; Lorena Comparato
- Writing career
- Years active: 1970s–present

Luís Filipe Loureiro Comparato (born in 1949), known as Doc Comparato, is a Brazilian writer of miniseries, television series and Brazilian cinema.

== Career ==
He was a founder of the Centro de Criação da Rede Globo, acting as writer of shows like Mulher (1998), O Tempo e o Vento (1985), A Justiceira (1997), and Lampião e Maria Bonita (1982), receiving the Gold Medal of Cinema and Television Festival of New York.

He worked in Europe, writing for film and television, including the miniseries "Me alquilo para soñar" (1989) with Gabriel García Márquez. Internationally recognized, he received nine awards, including the Japan Award for Television (1980–1981), the DAAD – Deuchst Academic Art Development (2002) and the Theatre Prize Anna Magnani (2003–2004), in Italy.

He is the author of two books: Roteiro (1982), on the art and technique of writing for cinema and television; and Da Criação ao Roteiro (1984), a book for writers and film students. He was the first Brazilian ml to teach a TV script and film course in Brazil in the Casa das Artes Laranjeiras (Rio). He is the father of actresses Bianca and Lorena Comparato.

== Work ==
=== Television ===
- 2008 – Os Mutantes – Caminhos do Coração (telenovela- Rede Record) – Colaborador
- 2007 – Caminhos do Coração (telenovela – Rede Record) - Colaborador
- 1998 – Mulher (série)|Mulher (series – TV Globo)
- 1997 – A Justiceira (miniseries – TV Globo)
- 1994 – Arnau (Spanish miniseries)
- 1993 – Retrato de Mulher (series – TV Globo)
- 1992 – Procura-se (Portuguese series)
- 1990 – A, E, I, O... Urca (miniseries – TV Globo)
- 1989 – Me alquilo para soñar (Spanish miniseries)
- 1988 – Histórias que o Diabo Gosta (Portuguese series)
- 1985 – O Tempo e o Vento (miniseries – TV Globo)
- 1984 – Padre Cícero (miniseries – TV Globo)
- 1983 – Bandidos da Falange (1983) (miniseries – TV Globo)
- 1982 – Lampião e Maria Bonita (miniseries – TV Globo)
- 1979 – Plantão de Polícia (series – TV Globo)

=== Theater ===
- 2013 – Nadistas e Tudistas (Ipanema Theater -RJ)
- 2010 – Lição Número 18 (Poeira Theater -RJ)
- 1985/2007 – Nostradamos (CCBB-RJ, SalaUno Roma, Jardel Filho Theater -SP)
- 2002 – O Círculo das Luzes (Maison de France-RJ)
- 2001 – Michelangelo (Carlos Gomes Theater -RJ)
- 1981 – O Beijo da Louca (Villa Lobos Theater -RJ)
- 1980 – As Tias (Teatro Lagoa Theater -RJ)

=== Cinema ===
- 2007 – El corazón de la tierra (Spanish movie)
- 1993 – Encontros Imperfeitos (Portuguese movie)
- 1992 – Viuvez Secreta (Portuguese movie)
- 1984 – Águia na Cabeça
- 1983 – O Cangaceiro Trapalhão
- 1983 – O Trapalhão na Arca de Noé
- 1981 – O Beijo no Asfalto
- 1981 – A Mulher Sensual
- 1981 – Bonitinha mas Ordinária ou Otto Lara Rezende
- 1979 – O Bom Burguês

== Publications ==
- 1979 – Sangue, Papéis e Lágrimas (contos editora Codecri)
- 1983 – Roteiro, arte e técnica de escrever para televisão e cinema (editora Nórdica)
- 1983 – El Guión (Garay Ediciones; Buenos Aires AR, Editora Planeta; D.F. México)
- 1988 – De La Creación Al Guión (Madri: Instituto Oficial Radio televisión)
- 2002 – Scrivere un Filme (Dino Audino; Roma, Itália)
- 2009 – Da Criação ao Roteiro (Editora Summus SP)
- 1984 – Nadistas e Tudistas (Editora Ebal; Rio de Janeiro)
- 1984 – A Incrível Viagem (Editora Ebal; Rio de Janeiro)
- 1981 – Me Alquilo Para Soñar (Casa – Jorge Niterói RJ)
