= Chopinzinho =

Municipality in Southern Brazil

Coordinates: 25°51′S 52°30′W

- Municipality
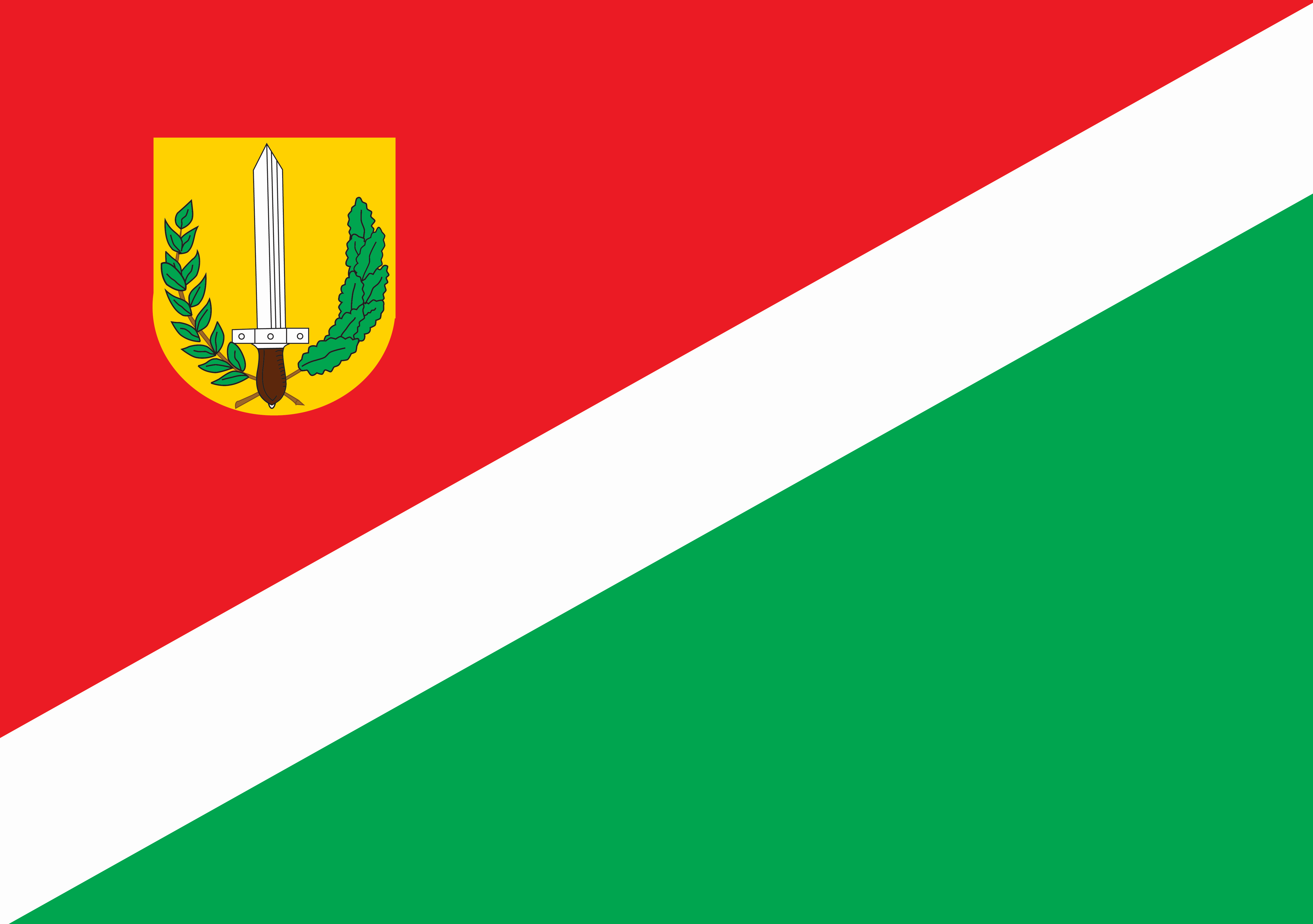
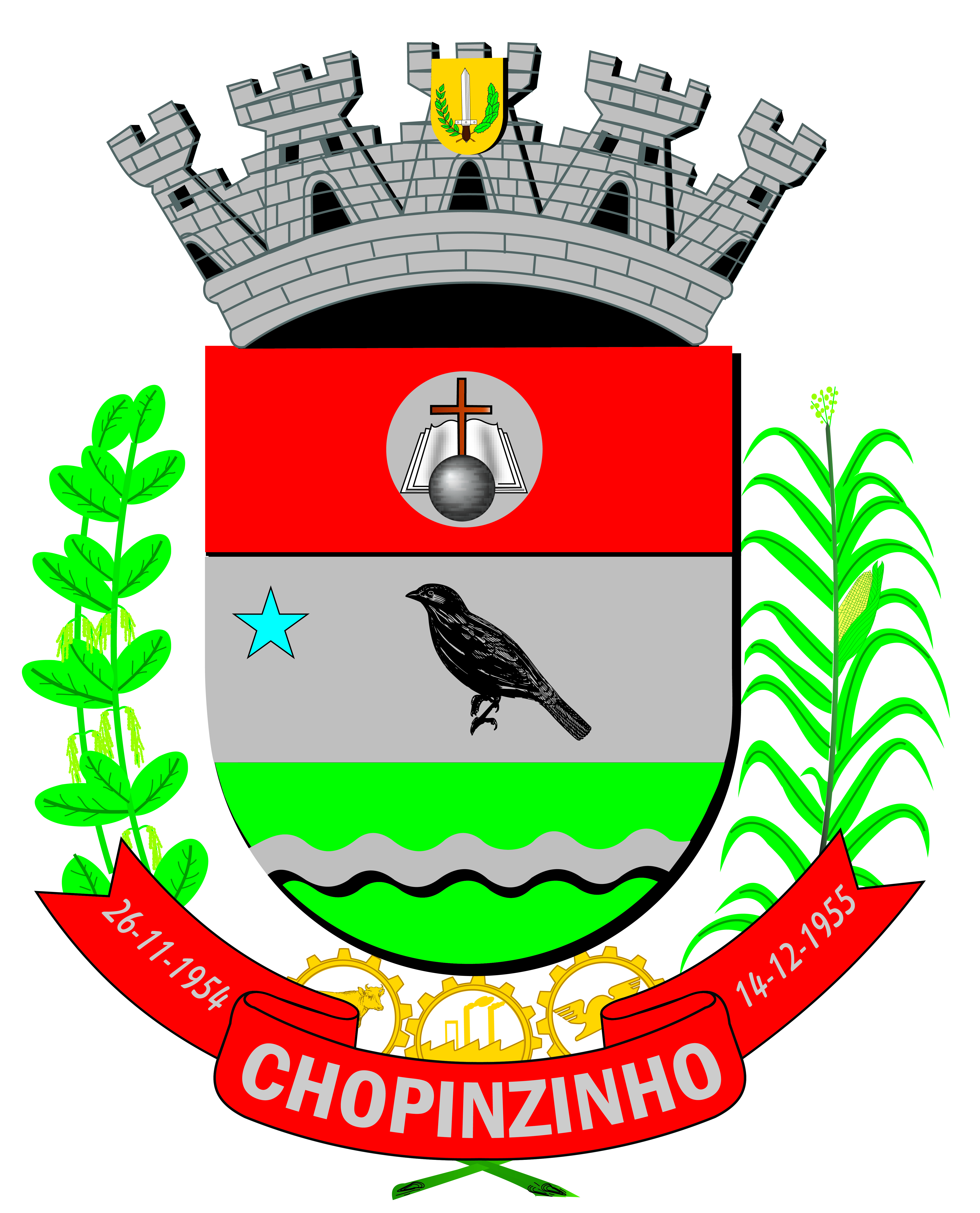
- Flag Coat of arms
- Interactive map of Chopinzinho
- Country: Brazil
- Region: Southern
- State: Paraná
- Mesoregion: Sudeste Paranaense

Area
  - Total: 370.539 sq mi (959.692 km^{2})

Population (2020)
  - Total: 19,167
- Time zone: UTC−3 (BRT)

Chopinzinho is a municipality in the state of Paraná in the Southern Region of Brazil. According to the 2020 population estimate taken by the Brazilian Institute of Geography and Statistics the municipality has a population of 19,167 inhabitants and an area of 959.692 square kilometres (370.539 mi^{2}).

== Notable people ==
Elize Matsunaga—murderer. Subject of the Netflix documentary Elize Matsunaga: Once Upon a Crime.

== See also ==
- List of municipalities in Paraná
