= Emanuelle Araújo =

Brazilian actress and singer (born 1976)

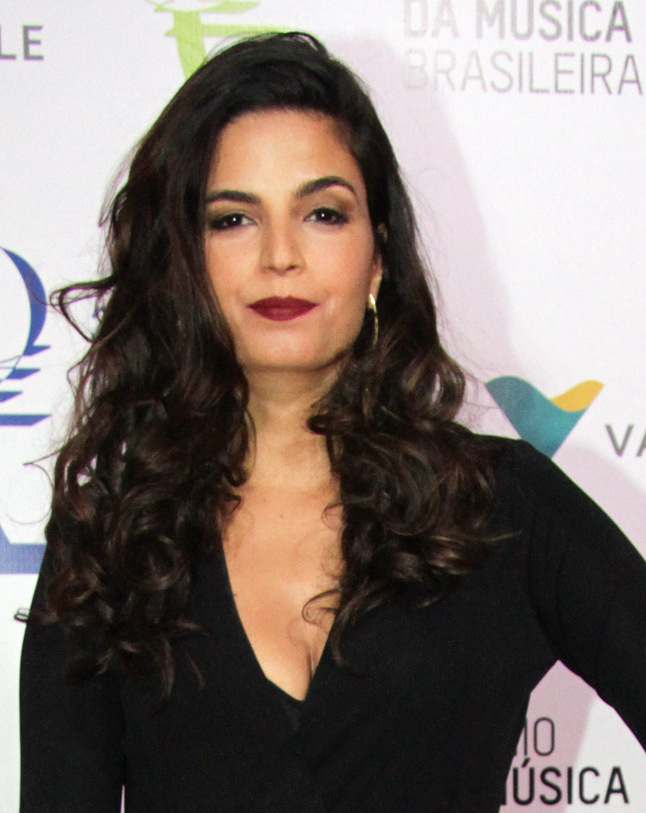
- Araujó at the 26th Brazilian Music Award in 2015

Background information
- Born: July 21, 1976 (age 50); Salvador, Bahia, Brazil
- Genres: Pop; axé; samba; MPB
- Occupations: Actress; singer; songwriter
- Instruments: Vocals; acoustic guitar
- Years active: 1989–present
- Member of: Moinho
- Formerly of: Banda Eva
- Website: www.emanuellearaujo.com.br

Emanuelle Araújo (born July 21, 1976) is a Brazilian actress and singer. She became nationally known in 1999 as lead singer of Banda Eva, where she stayed for only two and a half years until 2002. In 2004 she founded the samba-rock band Moinho with Lan Lan and Toni Costa, in which she is currently the vocalist.

== Early life and career ==
Araújo began her career at the age of ten doing theater with the Interarte Company, where she remained until 1990 and starred in the plays A Bruxinha que Era Boa, O Gato Malhado e a Andorinha Sinhá, O Rapto das Cebolinhas, Alice no País das Maravilhas, Pare para Decidir – O Musical and Dançar Bahia, the last two of which she traveled with to presentations in Argentina, Uruguay, Peru and France.

In 1993, at age 17, she became pregnant and had her daughter, Bruna. In 1994, she entered the biology course of the Federal University of Bahia, but gave up the first year and began to study performing arts in the same place, where she graduated in 1998.

Araújo gained wider recognition in Brazil when she became the lead singer of the axé band Banda Eva in 1999, recording and touring with the group until 2002. After leaving Banda Eva she co-founded the samba-rock band Moinho in 2004 alongside percussionist Lan Lan and guitarist Toni Costa, assuming the role of vocalist and performing a repertoire that mixed samba, rock and pop influences in venues and festivals in Rio de Janeiro and other Brazilian cities.

Parallel to her musical activities, Araújo consolidated a career as a television actress, appearing in telenovelas such as Pé na Jaca (2006), A Favorita (2008), Três Irmãs (2009), Cordel Encantado (2011) and Gabriela (2012), as well as in the youth series Malhação between 2014 and 2015. She later took on leading roles in streaming and prime-time productions, including the Netflix comedy series Samantha! (2018), in which she played the title character Samantha Alencar, and the telenovela Órfãos da Terra (2019), portraying Zuleika Nasser.

== Filmography ==
Television
Year	Title	Role	Notes
1989	Via Láctea	Presenter	
1996	Eva 96	Presenter	Carnival Special
1998	Danada de Sabida	Mariana	Year end special
2002	Os Anjos de Onde Vem?	Carla	
2002	A Mulher de Roxo	Vivian	Year end special
2006	Pé na Jaca	Clotilda Rodrigues Alves	
2007	A Grande Família	Josefina (Josi)	Episode: "Bonequinha do Papai"
2008	A Favorita	Manuela Ferreira (Manu)	
2009	Três Irmãs	Maria Sonia Ferreira (Soninha Rainha)	
2009	Dança dos Famosos	Participante	Season 6
2009	Cama de Gato	Heloísa Miranda	
2011	Cordel Encantado	Marquesa Florinda Alfredo	
2012	As Brasileiras	Úrsula	Episode: "A Desastrada de Salvador"
2012	Louco por Elas	Talita	Episode: "Violeta Faz Todos Embarcarem em Sua Loucura"
2012	Gabriela	Teodora	
2014–15	Malhação	Dandara Duarte	Season 22
2016	E Aí... Comeu?	Leila	
2016	A Lei do Amor	Yara Garcia	
2017	Show dos Famosos	Participant	Season 1
2018	Samantha!	Samantha Alencar	Main role
2019	Órfãos da Terra	Zuleika Nasser	
2023	The Masked Singer Brasil (season 3)	Julieta	Contestant

Film
Year	Title	Role
2006	Fica Comigo Esta Noite	Singer
2007	Ó Paí, Ó	Rosa
2014	S.O.S. Mulheres ao Mar	Beatriz
2014	Na Quebrada	Ylana
2015	Até Que A Sorte Nos Separe 3: A Falência Final	Malu de Carmo
2017	Bingo: The King of the Mornings	Gretchen
2017	Lampião	Maria Bonita

== Theater ==
Year	Title	Role
1989	A Bruxinha que Era Boa	
1990	O Gato Malhado e a Andorinha Sinhá	
1991	Não Apresse o Rio, Ele Corre Sozinho	
1992	O Rapto das Cebolinhas	
1994	Alice's Adventures in Wonderland	
1995	Pare para Decidir – O Musical	
1997	Dançar Bahia	
2007	Tieta	Tieta
2010	Colapso	Claudia
2022	Chicago	Velma Kelly
2025	Clara Nunes - A Tal Guerreira	Clara Nunes

== Discography ==
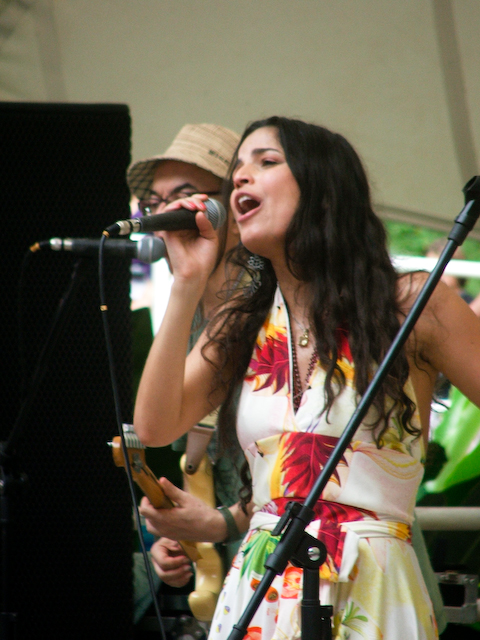
Araújo performing in 2008

=== Studio albums ===
Lista de álbuns
Album	Details
O Problema É a Velocidade	Release: September 2, 2016; Formats: CD, Music download; Record company: Deckdisc
Quero Viver Sem Grilo - uma Viagem a Jards Macalé	Release: February 7, 2020; Formats: CD, Music download; Record company: Deckdisc

=== Singles ===
List of singles
Title	Year	Album
"Uma Mulher"	2016	O Problema É a Velocidade
"Céu Azul"	2016	O Problema É a Velocidade
"Hotel das Estrelas"	2019	Quero Viver Sem Grilo - uma Viagem a Jards Macalé
