= Luma Costa =

Brazilian actress

- Born: July 5, 1988 (age 37); Rio de Janeiro, Brazil
- Occupation: Actress
- Spouse: Leonardo Martins (m. 2012)
- Children: 1

Luma Costa (July 5, 1988 in Rio de Janeiro) is a Brazilian actress.

== Biography ==
In addition to participation in programs of Rede Globo and Carga Pesada and Sítio do Picapau Amarelo, Luma became known as Márcia Anita of Começar de Novo.

In 2006, Luma began her graduation in Journalism. The course was locked up in 2007 to devote her best for her acting career, in the same year she won a prominent role on the TV Record telenovela, Luz do Sol.

In 2009, she made her first novel as an adult, Poder Paralelo, Lauro César Muniz, in which she played Bebel, a girl who seduces older men and is very selfish.

After five years in Rede Record, Luma returned in 2011 to Rede Globo soap opera in Fina Estampa, the role of the mysterious Surfer Nanda.

== Personal life ==
In June 2012, Luma married businessman Leonardo Martins.

On October 28, 2013, she confirmed that she was pregnant with her first child, the result of her marriage to Leonardo Martins. Luma gave birth to Antônio on June 12, 2014, around 12:30 in the maternity ward Perinatal, in Rio de Janeiro, cesarean section, with 3.320 kg and 48.5 cm.

== Career ==
=== TV ===
Television
Year	Title	Role	Notes
2001	Um Anjo Caiu do Céu	Ermelinda (young)	Episode: "January 22, 2001"
2002	Malhação	Clara	Season 9; Episode: "August 2, 2002"
2002	Sítio do Pica-Pau Amarelo	Alice	Episode: "Volta ao Reino das Águas Claras"
2002	O Beijo do Vampiro	Letícia	Episode: "May 2, 2003"
2003	Malhação	Duda	Season 10; Episode: "September 18, 2003"
2003	Carga Pesada	Marininha	Episode: "Terra Mãe"
2004	Começar de Novo	Marcianita Estrela	
2005	Malhação	Flávia	Season 12; Episode: "September 18, 2005"
2006	Floribella	Luana	Season 2; Episodes: "May 10–17, 2006"
2006	Prova de Amor	Fernanda Saboya (Nanda)	Episode: "February 7, 2006"
2006	Páginas da Vida	Francis Ribeiro	Episodes: "September 7–October 28, 2006"
2007	Luz do Sol	Adriana Alcântara Diniz (Drica) / Maria Rosa Souza	
2009	Poder Paralelo	Isabel Borges (Bebel)	
2011	Fina Estampa	Fernanda Magalhães Duarte (Nanda)	
2013	Pé na Cova	Odete Roitman Pereira	71 episodes (2013–2016)
2016	Sol Nascente	Elisa Benatti	

=== Theater ===
Parts
Year	Title
2001	A Menina e o Vento
2003	Hop-o'-My-Thumb

=== Cinema ===
Films
Year	Title	Role
2017	Duas de Mim	Helena
