= Impuros =

- Genre: Crime drama
- Created by: Alexandre Fraga
- Directed by: René Sampaio; Tomás Portella
- Starring: Raphael Logam; Rui Ricardo Dias; Cyria Coentro; André Gonçalves; Fernanda Machado; Flávio Bauraqui; Rocco Pitanga; João Vitor Silva; Cadu Fávero; Peter Brandão
- Country of origin: Brazil
- Original language: Portuguese
- No. of seasons: 5
- No. of episodes: 50

Production
- Production location: Rio de Janeiro
- Cinematography: Kika Cunha; André Modugno
- Editor: Leticia Giffoni
- Running time: 42–59 minutes
- Production companies: Barry Company; Fox Networks Group; Star Original Production

Original release
- Network: Fox Premium (seasons 1–2); Star+ (seasons 3–4); Disney+ (season 5–present)
- Release: October 19, 2018 – present

Impuros is a Brazilian crime drama television series produced by The Walt Disney Company Latin America in association with Barry Company and directed by Tomás Portella and René Sampaio. The first season was released on October 19, 2018 on Fox Premium. The second season was released on November 8, 2019. The third season was released on August 31, 2021 on Star+. The fifth season was released on July 24, 2024 on Disney+. A movie was released in 2019.

== Premise ==
Based on real events and set in the 1990s, Impuros follows the story of Evandro do Dendê, leader of one of the largest criminal factions in the periphery of Rio de Janeiro, and police Morello, a self-destructive veteran, who will seek vengeance at all costs. Two violent men, strategists, cold, respected by their followers and sharing the love for war.

== Cast and characters ==
- Raphael Logam as Evandro
- Rui Ricardo Dias as Morello
- Cyria Coentro as Arlete
- André Gonçalves (actor) as Salvador
- Fernanda Machado as Andreia
- Flávio Bauraqui as Adilson
- Roco Pitanga as Bruninho Bagdá
- João Vitor Silva as ustavo
- Cadu Favero as Brito
- Peter Brandão as Hermes
- Sérgio Malheiros as Wilbert
- Leandro Firmino as Gilmar
- Lorena Comparato as Geise
- Gillrray Coutinho as Dr. Burgos
- Vinícius Patrício as Bahiano / Juninho
- Karize Brum as Inês
- César Troncoso as Neves
- Jean Pierre Noher as Charles
- Germán Palacios as Arturo Urquiza
- Julieta Zylberberg as Pilar
- Antônio Carlos as Zeca
- Sebastián Iturria as Mariano

== Reception ==
=== Awards and nominations ===
==== International Emmy Award ====
Year	Category	Nominee	Result	Ref
2019	Best Performance By an Actor	Raphael Logam	Nominated	
