= Vila Guilherme =

District of São Paulo, Brazil

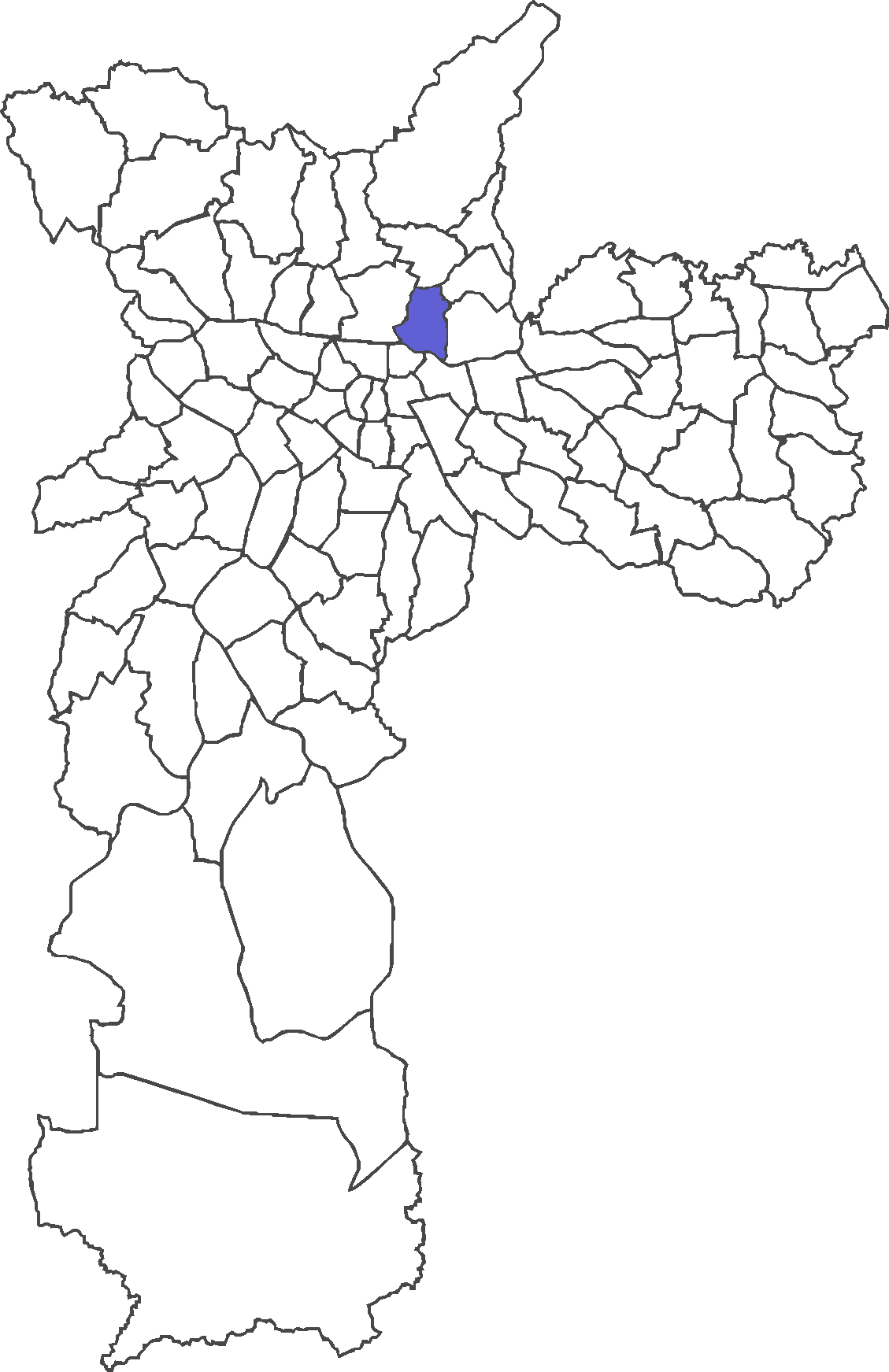
- Location in the city of São Paulo

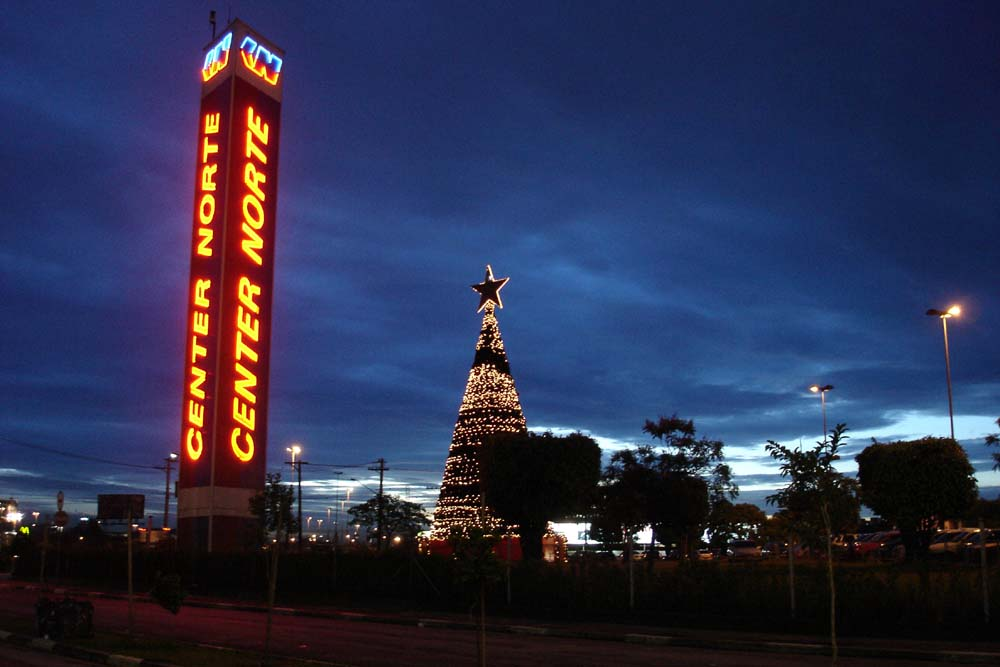
- Center Norte Mall
- Country: Brazil
- State: São Paulo
- City: São Paulo

Government
  - Type: Subprefecture
  - Subprefect: Antônio de Pádua Perosa

Population (2000)
  - Total: 49.984
- HDI: 0.868 –high
- Website: Subprefecture of Vila Maria

Vila Guilherme is a district located in the north of São Paulo.
