= Digital influencer =

A digital influencer is a digital media content creator who uses his/her media platforms to influence audience behavior both online and offline.

Digital influencer may also refer to:

- Internet celebrity
- Digital marketing
- Social media marketing
- Influencer
- Influencer marketing
- Virtual influencer
