= Murder of Isabella Nardoni =

2008 infanticide in Brazil

- Location: 23.4950612°S 46.6089653°W; Rua Santa Leocádia, 138; Vila Guilherme; São Paulo, Brazil
- Date: 29 March 2008; 18 years ago 23:45 (BRT (UTC-3))
- Attack type: Homicide, infanticide
- Deaths: 1
- Victim: Isabella Nardoni
- Perpetrators: Alexandre Alves Nardoni (father); Anna Carolina Trotta Peixoto Jatobá (stepmother)
- Verdict: Guilty for triple-qualified homicide and procedural fraud
- Convictions: Alexandre Alves Nardoni: 31 years, 1 month, 10 days; Anna Carolina Trotta Peixoto Jatobá: 26 years, 8 months

The murder of Isabella de Oliveira Nardoni was a widely publicized infanticide case in Brazil. On the night of 29 March 2008, five-year-old Isabella died from severe injuries after being thrown from the sixth floor of a building in North São Paulo, where her father, Alexandre Alves Nardoni, her stepmother, Anna Carolina Trotta Peixoto Jatobá, and her newborn half-siblings lived. Investigations concluded that Isabella had been physically abused by her father and stepmother, and both were convicted of intentional homicide.

The case received extensive media coverage in Brazil, with continuous reporting across major outlets. A survey indicated that more than 98% of Brazilians were aware of her death, the highest percentage ever recorded in Brazilian media coverage research.

== Family ==
Isabella de Oliveira Nardoni was born on 18 April 2002 in São Paulo, Brazil, to Alexandre Alves Nardoni and Ana Carolina Oliveira. Alexandre and Oliveira had met while in school and dated for three years. Oliveira became pregnant with Isabella at the age of 17, while Nardoni was about to begin law school. Although they considered moving in together during the pregnancy, their relationship was already deteriorating, and Oliveira chose to live with her parents after Isabella's birth.

Approximately eleven months later, Oliveira ended her relationship with Nardoni after becoming convinced that he was being unfaithful. During Isabella's early years, she remained primarily in her mother's care. As she grew older, a custody routine was established in which Isabella stayed with Nardoni from Friday to Sunday twice a month. By this time, Nardoni was married to Anna Carolina Trotta Peixoto Jatobá, with whom he had two sons, Pietro and Cauã.

Nardoni and Jatobá, who had been classmates in law school, began a relationship while Oliveira was still pregnant with Isabella. According to Oliveira, she ended her relationship with Nardoni after confirming his infidelity.

After Isabella's death, Oliveira stated that Jatobá had been jealous of her past relationship with Nardoni. Over time, Jatobá became the primary person communicating with Oliveira about Isabella. Oliveira also claimed that members of Nardoni's family were reluctant to leave Isabella alone with Jatobá, and that when Nardoni was absent, his sister would stay overnight with the family. A neighbour told police that Isabella's paternal grandmother had described Jatobá as "crazy" and capable of harming the child. An anonymous friend of Oliveira told the press that Isabella sometimes returned from visits to her father's home crying and often wanted to return to her mother earlier than scheduled.

== Murder ==
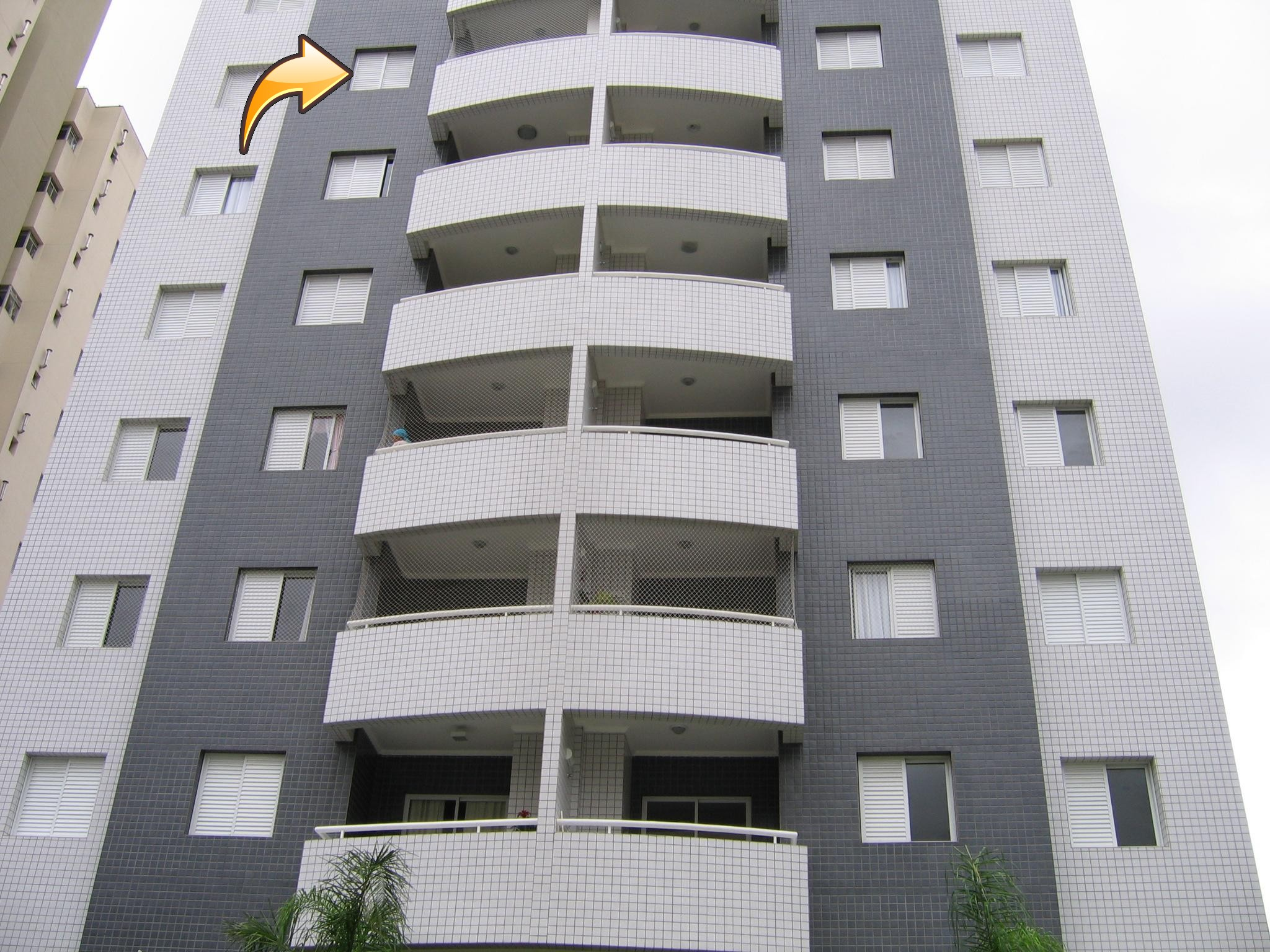
Apartment where Alexandre Nardoni and Anna Carolina Jatobá lived with Isabella, Cauã, and Pietro, before Isabella was thrown from the sixth floor (left side, grey window).

At approximately 22:30 BRT on 29 March 2008, Isabella fell from the sixth floor of Edifício London, an apartment building in Vila Guilherme, north São Paulo, where Nardoni lived with Jatobá, now his wife, and their two sons, Cauã and Pietro. She was found in the front garden of the building in cardiac arrest. Rescue personnel attempted resuscitation for 34 minutes but were unsuccessful, and Isabella died on the way to the hospital. Nardoni and Jatobá were taken to a local police station for questioning.

Nardoni told police that when the family arrived at the building, Isabella was already asleep, so he carried her upstairs while Jatobá remained in the car with their sons. According to his account, he placed Isabella in the guest room, turned on a bedside lamp as well as a light in the boys' room, locked the door, and went back downstairs. After bringing Jatobá and the children upstairs, he said he noticed that the light in Isabella's room was on, but she was no longer in bed. Nardoni claimed she had been alone in the room for about five to ten minutes. He stated that he discovered a hole in the window's safety net, looked outside, and saw Isabella's body on the ground. He then told Jatobá to call her father, and she also phoned Nardoni's father.

In an interview, Isabella's mother, Ana Carolina Oliveira, said that Jatobá was "hysterical" when she called, repeatedly screaming that Isabella had fallen. Oliveira initially believed that Isabella had fallen into the building's pool and told Jatobá to attempt CPR. When Oliveira arrived at the scene and saw the severity of her daughter's injuries, she avoided moving her for fear of causing further harm. She reported kissing Isabella and telling her to remain calm and that everything would be all right.

Isabella was transported to a hospital but succumbed to her injuries.

=== Burial ===
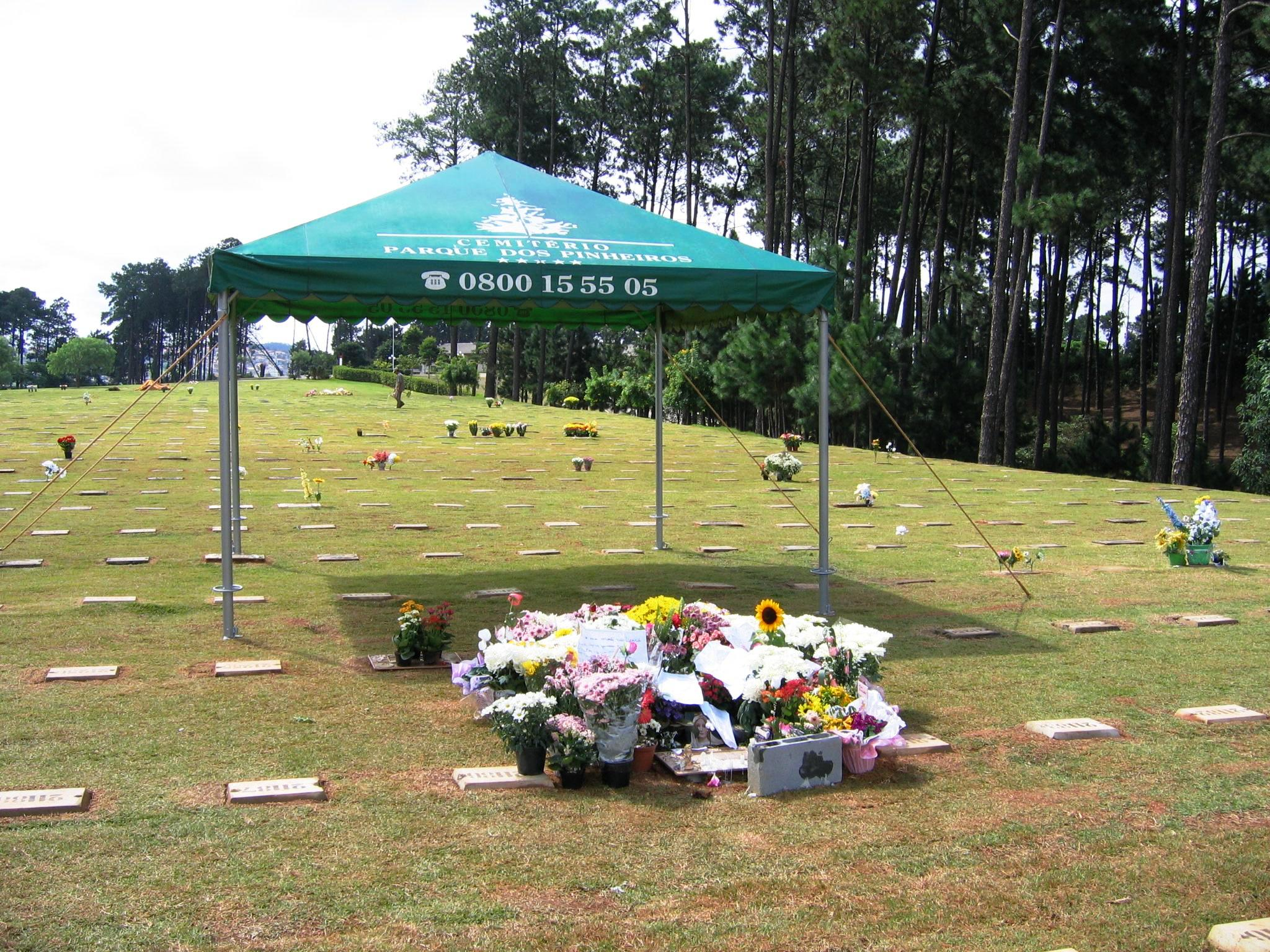
Isabella's grave

Isabella was buried in the Parque dos Pinheiros Cemetery, located in the São Paulo district of Jaçanã. The funeral service was attended by about 200 people.

== Investigation ==
Investigators reported finding Isabella's blood in Nardoni's car and apartment, on a towel and a diaper, as well as vomit on his T-shirt. They also identified footprints matching his flip-flops on a bed near the window through which Isabella had been thrown, and traces of nylon from the safety screen on his shirt. Fragments of the safety screen were also discovered on a pair of scissors in the apartment.

Although circumstantial evidence suggested that Isabella had been thrown from a bedroom window, her injuries were not fully consistent with a fall; only her wrists were broken. Examiners from the Instituto Médico Legal (IML) reported that her body showed additional injuries unrelated to the fall. These injuries indicated that she had been punched and asphyxiated before being thrown from the window.

On 18 April 2008, both Alexandre Nardoni and Anna Carolina Jatobá were indicted by the São Paulo Civil Police. They continued to deny involvement in Isabella's death.

== Trial ==
The trial of Alexandre Nardoni and Anna Carolina Jatobá began on 22 March 2010, almost two years after Isabella's death. On the first day, Isabella's mother, Ana Carolina Oliveira, testified. She stated that Jatobá had been extremely jealous of her and that Alexandre had once threatened to kill her and her mother before disappearing with Isabella, following a dispute over late alimony payments. She also recalled that Jatobá had called her on the night of Isabella's death, shouting that it was Oliveira's fault.

At the request of the defense, Oliveira remained at the courthouse for three additional days, staying in a small room until a psychiatrist determined she was under extreme stress and recommended her release.

On 25 March 2010, both Nardoni and Jatobá testified before the jury. They denied involvement in Isabella's death, with Jatobá crying during her testimony. Nardoni testified from 10:45 a.m. until 4:25 p.m., during which he claimed that police investigators had pressured him to confess, suggesting they could classify the case as accidental homicide. He stated that he felt humiliated by this and accused the police of being uninterested in determining what had happened on the day of Isabella's death. Nardoni also said that he had lost "the most precious thing" in his life, denied the presence of a third person in the apartment, and maintained that he had locked Isabella inside.

During questioning by District Attorney Francisco Cembranelli about why he had not attempted to help Isabella after the fall, Nardoni initially replied that he was checking if she was alive, later stating that he was in shock, and finally claiming that a neighbour had instructed him not to touch her. When asked why he had not spoken to Oliveira during Isabella's wake and funeral, he answered that it had been an "embarrassing situation."

Later that day, Jatobá testified until nearly 9:00 p.m. She denied all accusations, asserted that Isabella had been very attached to her, and admitted that she had "embellished" stories when questioned by police, including claiming to have been beaten by her father. Her testimony contradicted Nardoni's in some respects; while he described their arguments as normal, she admitted they fought frequently and harshly.

After a five-day trial, in the early hours of 27 March 2010, Nardoni was sentenced to 31 years, 1 month, and 10 days in prison, while Jatobá received 26 years and 8 months. Both were also convicted of procedural fraud and sentenced to an additional eight months for attempting to clean the crime scene. Under Brazilian law, the sentences are to be served concurrently. Aggravating factors included Isabella's age—under 14 at the time of the crime—and Nardoni's position as her father. During sentencing, Nardoni reportedly remained expressionless, while Jatobá cried. Outside the courthouse, crowds celebrated the verdict with fireworks.
