= Ilana Casoy =

Brazilian writer (b. 1960)

- Born: January 16, 1960 (age 66); São Paulo, São Paulo, Brazil
- Occupation: Author
- Years active: 2008–present
- Relatives: Boris Casoy (uncle)

Ilana Casoy (born February 16, 1960) is a Brazilian writer.

She graduated from Fundação Getúlio Vargas and has dedicated herself to the study of criminal psychology, especially related to serial killers. Ilana Casoy has published several books, some of which are based on famous criminal cases in Brazil, such as “A Prova é a Testemunha” about Isabella Nardoni’s case. She also wrote “O Quinto Mandamento – Caso de Polícia”, a book related to the 2002 murder of the Richthofen couple. From 2012 to 2013, she collaborated with the Discovery Channel.

Casoy has also written works of fiction. She was invited by the channel Fox Brasil to create a psychological profile of Dexter Morgan, the anti-hero and protagonist of Dexter, a popular American TV show. Casoy also collaborated on Dupla Identidade, a series written by Gloria Perez and directed by Mauro Mendonça Filho. In this series, Bruno Gagliasso plays a serial killer inspired by Ted Bundy, subject of the book Serial Killers: Crazy or Cruel? The series also features Luana Piovani as a forensic psychologist police officer specialized in hunting serial killers.

== Bibliography ==
Title	Year	Type	Notes
Serial Killer, Louco ou Cruel	2008	Novel	
O Quinto Mandamento	2009	Novel	
Serial Killer Made in Brazil	2010	Novel	
A prova é a testemunha	2010	Novel	
Arquivos Serial Killers – Louco ou cruel? e Made in Brazil	2014	Novel	
Casos de Família – Arquivos Richthofen e Arquivos Nardoni	2016	Novel	
Bom Dia, Verônica ( Andrea Killmore)	2016	Novel	
