= Elize Matsunaga: Once Upon a Crime =

- Elize Matsunaga: Era uma Vez um Crime
- Genre: Documentary
- Starring: Stephanie Sherry; Elize Matsunaga
- Country of origin: Brazil
- Original language: Portuguese
- No. of seasons: 1
- No. of episodes: 4

Production
- Running time: 47–52 minutes

Original release
- Network: Netflix
- Release: 8 July 2021

Elize Matsunaga: Once Upon a Crime (Elize Matsunaga: Era uma Vez um Crime) is a 2021 docuseries released on Netflix on July 8, 2021, starring Stephanie Sherry and Elize Matsunaga.

Matsunaga shot and dismembered her husband, Marcos Matsunaga, who was a member of the family that formerly owned the Yoki food company in Brazil. Matsunaga is from Chopinzinho.

== Cast ==
- Stephanie Sherry as Juliana Fincatti Santoro
- Elize Matsunaga

== Episodes ==
No.	Title	Original release date
1	"Marital Status: Widow"	July 8, 2021
2	"A Princess Life"	July 8, 2021
3	"Elize's Unfortunate Idea"	July 8, 2021
4	"Echoes of a Crime"	July 8, 2021
