= List of 3% episodes =

3% is a Brazilian web television series produced by Netflix and aired in 33 episodes over four seasons between November 2016 and August 2020. Following are lists of seasons and episodes.

== Seasons ==
Season	Episodes	Originally released
1	8	November 25, 2016
2	10	April 27, 2018
3	8	June 7, 2019
4	7	August 14, 2020

== Episodes ==
=== Season 1 (2016) ===
No. overall	No. in season	Title	Directed by	Written by	Original release date
1	1	"Chapter 01: Cubes"	César Charlone	Pedro Aguilera	November 25, 2016
Far in the future, the majority of the population lives in poverty in the Inland, while those on the Offshore live in a virtual paradise. Every year, each 20-year-old has a chance of getting to the Offshore through a series of tests called "the Process", but only 3% make it. Michele is one of them, entering with her best friend Bruna. The head of the Process, Ezequiel, is observed by an Offshore woman named Aline. The first test is an interview, after which one candidate commits suicide out of frustration for failing. Fernando wonders if he will pass because he is in a wheelchair, but he does. After being placed into groups, a candidate named Joana notices another candidate, Rafael, has faked his registration. The second test is for each person to assemble nine cubes out of a collection of complex blocks. Rafael cheats, stealing a cube from another, but Ezequiel allows him to pass. Michele only has eight, but Fernando puts them all together to make a ninth, allowing them both to pass. Joana makes eleven cubes. Later Michele and Bruna are led to the back, as the Offshore suspects one of them is an infiltrated mole for a revolutionary group known as "the Cause". Michele convinces Bruna to attack the interrogator and Bruna is killed. The testers then assume that Bruna was the mole, although in fact it was Michele, who breaks down in tears for having caused her friend's death.
2	2	"Chapter 02: Coins"	Daina Giannecchini & Jotagá Crema	Cássio Koshikumo & Denis Nielsen	November 25, 2016
When physically examined, Fernando is told that his legs can be healed at the Offshore, but he tells Michele he wishes to remain in his wheelchair, as his life would not be the same without it. The third test is a fake crime scene set in the Offshore. The group must figure out what happened here. At first it appears that the dummy woman is simply choking, but Fernando believes the choking woman was poisoned. The group agrees, but Rafael points out the clues are misleading, and the woman is actually having an allergic reaction to silver. Fernando eventually agrees, and they pass with Rafael's theory. Aline tracks down Ezequiel, who disappears for the fourth test. The next test involves voting who in the group will be kicked out; the winners take a coin to prove that they are moving on. Despite arguments, Marco suggests they draw scarf lengths to remain the most fair. Joana draws the shortest scarf but never returned her coin to the bag, stealing what should have been Lucas' spot.
3	3	"Chapter 03: Corridor"	Dani Libardi	Ivan Nakamura & Denis Nielsen	November 25, 2016
The group must walk down a dark corridor together, but a gas is released that causes hallucinations. Everyone sees something different, but Joana is able to escort them all to the other side, passing the test. After being shown to their dorms for the night, Fernando and Michele share a kiss. Despite the effects being meant to wear off, Ágata continues to hallucinate, and tries to kill Joana, but Rafael intervenes. Meanwhile, Ezequiel is shown to have been sneaking out to see a young boy named Augusto who lives in the Inland. Through flashbacks, it is revealed that Joana accidentally killed a gangster's son, which prompted her to fake a registration as well in order to be allowed in the process and evade retaliation. Rafael notices her fake registration, and the two blackmail each other. When Augusto sneaks in and is almost caught by Aline, Ezequiel tells him to never come back. When they all wake up the next morning, Joana realizes the exits have been blocked, trapping the candidates inside the dorms.
4	4	"Chapter 04: Gateway"	Jotagá Crema	Cássio Koshikumo, Ivan Nakamura & Jotagá Crema	November 25, 2016
The candidates begin trapped in the dorms still. While looking for a way out, Marco reflects on his family history, as each of them have successfully passed the Process and made it to the Offshore. He organizes everyone to get food and pass the test, and the group succeeds with ease. Ezequiel is displeased that they all have passed, and he decides to modify the test, no longer sending food to see how the candidates react. Eventually, Marco and some other men fashion weapons out of the beds to pry open the gate, and when they realize that there's no way out, they (notably Marco) assume that the test will be a survival of the fittest type with limited supplies. The group of men then attack the others who sat around rather than trying to pry the gate, stealing their food and taking them prisoner. Marco loses it as the candidates try to hide food, killing a girl. Meanwhile Michele and friends build a barricade to keep Marco's group out, while Joana escapes from the test by climbing a vent. Ezequiel meets her and explains that only she can stop the test, as he will not. Joana returns, freeing the people whom Marco subjected. Everyone violently attacks Marco's group, beating and presumably killing a few. The gates open and the prisoners escape, minus everyone in Marco's group. Marco attempts to flee, but the door catches him, presumably killing and eliminating him. Meanwhile, Aline is caught snooping through Ezequiel's things, and it is revealed that Rafael attempted the Process last year and failed, before stealing the registry of his unconscious brother to take the Process for a second time. He also reveals to Michele that he is a mole for the Cause as well.
5	5	"Chapter 05: Water"	César Charlone	Pedro Aguilera	November 25, 2016
Five years prior to the start of the series, Ezequiel becomes the head proctor for the 99th Process and onward. He is married to a proctor, Júlia, who assists with the first test, the interview stage. During his first time in charge, she disqualifies a candidate who had done no wrong—the candidate simply admitted to having a child. Later, she and Ezequiel monitor a raid, where a young boy is seen in the footage. Júlia breaks down in tears at the sight of the boy, and she later reveals to Ezequiel he is Augusto, the son she abandoned when she passed the Process. Throughout Ezequiel's time as head proctor, Júlia's behavior becomes more and more erratic until she attempts to escape to the Inland to see Augusto. Ezequiel stops her and has her committed to the Rehabilitation and Treatment Center, where she drowns herself in the ocean, committing the first suicide in the history of the Offshore. Ezequiel breaks down and goes to see Augusto himself, secretly beginning a relationship with the boy that continues today. Throughout the flashbacks, the candidates relax in the grass of the testing facility before being led to their individual rooms.
6	6	"Chapter 06: Glass"	Daina Giannecchini & Dani Libardi	Cássio Koshikumo, Denis Nielsen, Ivan Nakamura & Jotagá Crema	November 25, 2016
Each given their own rooms, the families of each candidate are brought in, giving the candidates an option: continue with the Process, or give up and take an outstanding amount of money to take for their family. Michele and Rafael pass; Joana is confronted by a man sent by the father of the boy she killed, who enters her room posing as her father. He tells her she can either stay there and be killed or walk out with him and live, since the Process is offering more money than the price put on her head. She decides to stay and the man reveals himself to be a citizen of the Offshore, who tells her that she passed. Fernando goes through a reverse experience as his father tries to convince him to stay but he wants to go back. When his father tells him he will have nowhere to go if he returns, he decides to stay. The remaining candidates head for their final, individual tests: Michele must tell Bruna's parents that Bruna is dead and convinces them to allow their younger daughter to take part of the Process; Fernando must design a new test for the Process; and Rafael must seek help from another candidate in order to press two buttons at the same time. They all pass; Rafael made it with Fernando's help after revealing to him that he and Michele are both with the Cause. Ezequiel goes to tell Augusto he cannot see him anymore, and Aline agrees to keep Ezequiel's secret. Michele digs out a small capsule from under her skin.
7	7	"Chapter 07: Capsule"	Daina Giannecchini	Cássio Koshikumo	November 25, 2016
A celebratory dinner is held for the candidates before the final step, the "purification" ritual. Michele poisons Ezequiel's drink using the poison from the capsule she removed from her hip, but he and César inadvertently exchange their cups, resulting in César being killed instead. Knowing he was the real target, Ezequiel interrogates all candidates individually and Rafael, who saw Michele's actions, drops the empty capsule over a railing. Ezequiel and Cássia stage a fake confession from the captured Cause member they hold in which he names Aline as a fellow member, and she is arrested, suspected of the murder. In a final attempt to prove her innocence, she tries to send the Council some files incriminating Ezequiel, but Nair interferes and has her send them a positive report on him. Michele returns to her room, only to find Ezequiel waiting for her, capsule in hand.
8	8	"Chapter 08: Button"	César Charlone	Denis Nielsen & Pedro Aguilera	November 25, 2016
Ezequiel tells Fernando that Michele has been eliminated and he decides to quit in order to find her. Meanwhile, Michele is actually being tortured by drowning and with a pau de arara. Ezequiel reveals to her the only reason he hasn't killed her yet is because he was also a member of the Cause and knows what is like to be in her shoes. He also shows her footage of her brother alive and well and says she has been fooled. Michele finally reveals where she was supposed to meet the Cause leader and he is arrested, while she is still allowed to the Offshore. The "purification" ritual is revealed to be a sterilization procedure so that heritability is completely replaced by meritocracy. Rafael is shocked at first, but hesitantly proceeds anyway. Joana quits the Process when Ezequiel offers her to earn a position among his élite by murdering a member of the gang which is after her. She meets Fernando as she leaves and they both express their frustration with the Process. Joana is last seen staring at some Cause graffiti and Fernando watches his father from afar. The successful candidates are last seen en route to the Offshore.

=== Season 2 (2018) ===
No. overall	No. in season	Title	Directed by	Written by	Original release date
9	1	"Chapter 01: Mirror"	Philippe Barcinski	Denis Nielsen & Pedro Aguilera	April 27, 2018
In a flashback, the existence of a Founding Trio responsible for building the Offshore is revealed, but one of the women was killed and the remaining two labeled themselves the Founding Couple. Back in the Inland, Joana joins the Cause. She and another recruit are given a challenge to each create three suicide capsules from poisonous frogs; both fail as a result of Joana's refusal to help her partner. However, Joana helps Silas to find a secret note from the Old Man about what to do in the event of his death. The plan involves stealing fertilizer from Gerson. They are successful, though Joana is shot and they trigger a surveillance warning in doing so. Joana later learns that the Cause plans to plant a bomb in the next Process and is reluctant to accept that they are willing to kill so many innocent people. In the Offshore, Michele's brother André is kept as a prisoner as the first murderer in the history of the Offshore. Ezequiel offers to secure her brother's freedom if she works on his plan and creates a new test for the Process. The test is a maze of both transparent and mirror walls that move in unpredictable patterns, but Ezequiel quickly develops ways of finding the exit, even managing to trap her inside. Meanwhile, he faces strong opposition from the Process's head of security, Marcela (Laila Garin), who disdains him for having commanded Processes which approved André (a murder suspect) and Michele (a former member of the Cause). Following Joana's and Silas' actions, Ezequiel tasks Michele with infiltrating the Cause and spoiling their plans.
10	2	"Chapter 02: Toaster"	Daina Giannecchini	Ivan Nakamura	April 27, 2018
After his arrival in the Offshore, Rafael attempts to build a radio to contact the Cause, but fails because the parts from Offshore are too advanced for what he needs. At a hookup party, Rafael seems uninterested in anyone, even rejecting a lady who is an "87% match", but hooks up with nurse Elisa, a 1.4% match. Rafael uses parts from Elisa's antique toaster and successfully builds the radio, but still fails to contact the Cause. Elisa catches Rafael using the radio but decides to let him off, informing him about the frequency block in the area. Rafael trains to become a soldier for the Process, and succeeds in passing the training mission after begging for a second chance. The test involved (initially unbeknownst to him) a simulation in which he is captured and tortured into confessing his true allegiance; he doesn't reveal his connection to the Cause even when Elisa is executed in front of him. It was all a plan Marcela had prepared to make sure he was loyal to the Offshore. Inland, Joana and Silas argue over the Cause's plan. Fernando works as the radio technician for his father's preachings, and helps candidates train for the Process. His childhood friend Glória (Cynthia Senek) is turning 20 this year and plans to take part in the upcoming process. Later, Joana seeks Fernando's help to find a better plan to disrupt the Process.
11	3	"Chapter 03: Static"	Daina Giannecchini	André Sirangelo	April 27, 2018
Fernando has a dream about Glória being the bomb carrier at the Process. Ezequiel instructs Michele to keep pretending to be a Cause infiltrator so as to locate the leaders and to get information on their bombing plan. During the registration for the upcoming Process, Fernando tries to warn Glória and pleads for her not to join the Process, to which Glória stomps off in anger, saying she rather die than be a quitter like him. At the Cause quarters, the members receive radio signals from Michele but Silas and Ivana (another important Cause member) fight over the credibility of the infiltrator, culminating in Silas destroying the radio. Joana takes the device to Fernando, and while he fixes it, he studies a register and comes up with a plan to stop the Process by wiping all the candidates' data. Rafael gets posted to guard the Process building but dopes his fellow comrade's drink in order to get his ACU post, where he spots Michele undercover. Rafael then feigns being attacked to destroy his camera and tail Michele. Glória spots Fernando working together with Joana and ends her friendship with Fernando. Fernando meets up with Michele after decoding her radio signals, and they run away together when Silas tries to snipe them both. They run to an abandoned warehouse, where Joana, Ivana and Rafael are at, and they hold one another at gunpoint, unbeknownst to them that Ezequiel is listening to their conversation through Michele's register and their identities as Cause members are now exposed.
12	4	"Chapter 04: Napkin"	Philippe Barcinski	André Sirangelo	April 27, 2018
Ivana and Joana tie up Michele and Rafael in different rooms to interrogate them, making them inhale gas that causes hallucinations. Under the guidance of Ezequiel, Michele successfully avoids exposing herself as the traitor (going as far as to reveal Ezequiel's past connection to the cause) and makes Joana and Fernando believe in her, although Ivana still trusts Rafael over her. Rafael admits to have fallen in love with an Offshore citizen and reveals their sterilization policy. Marcela, believing that Rafael was attacked and abducted by the Cause, soon arrives with her armed forces to rescue him. Michele plans to betray Ezequiel and escape with Joana and the others, but he allows André to communicate with her, causing her to back off. Ezequiel then instructs her to escape through a secret passageway while Ivana makes Rafael kill her in order for Rafael to keep up with his pretense as a loyal Offshore member. Marcela reports the situation to Cássia, who tells her she has something to reveal about Ezequiel and Michele. Joana witnesses Rafael killing Ivana and her misunderstanding about him deepens.
13	5	"Chapter 05: Lamp"	Philippe Barcinski	Ivan Nakamura, Juliana Rojas & Pedro Aguilera	April 27, 2018
Michele decides to betray Ezequiel, lying to him over the audio surveillance bug while relaying messages to Joana by writing on papers, without realizing that Ezequiel has found out what she is doing. Rafael decides to rat Michele out to Marcela, seeing how she was ready to betray him during the interrogation. Silas abruptly arrives at the hideout where Joana and Michele are, and is about to kill Michele when Ezequiel appears, claiming that he is there to save the Cause. Flashing back, a younger Ezequiel is ambitious and eager to infiltrate Offshore, a plan he devised himself. When he is told by the Old Man that he is not selected, Ezequiel becomes mad that the Cause questions his loyalty, throws a burning lamp at the Old Man and runs off. After succeeding in the Process, Ezequiel falls in love with Júlia, but she commits the Offshore's first suicide ever for being unable to see her son back at the Inland. Consumed by grief, Ezequiel takes it upon himself to destroy the Offshore. Back to the present, Cássia and Marcela break into Ezequiel's station and listen into his conversation with the Cause members in the hideout. Ezequiel reveals that he wants to bring the Process and Council members down, creating a New World where there is no division. Ezequiel also reveals that he dictated the Old Man's note for him to write, meaning that bombing the Process is his idea, and that the flask that Michele carries is not to detonate the bomb, but to conceal it from security scanners. Joana and Michele are strongly against the idea of hurting masses of innocents but Silas agrees with Ezequiel. As Ezequiel and Michele head back to the Process quarters, Marcela has already sent troops out to capture the Cause members. Ezequiel is killed by Marcela, who proceeds to frame the Cause for it. Michele finds herself unable to return to the Offshore since she is believed to be Ezequiel's accomplice.
14	6	"Chapter 06: Bottles"	Dani Libardi	Guilherme Freitas	April 27, 2018
Following Ezequiel's death, Inland citizens are encouraged to send in tips about the Cause and participants of the Process will be given an advantage for doing so. This causes unrest among the citizens. Joana notes that the Cause is probably not to be blamed for Ezequiel's death. Fernando suggests revealing the sterilization process to the citizens in hopes to make them reconsider joining the Process. Joana and Michele discuss ways to stop the bombing. Meanwhile, Glória has jitters about the upcoming Process. Using a device he stole from the registration booth, Fernando announces the truth about the sterilization process to the public as they celebrate the day of the Process, and this creates confusion and doubt among the Inland people. An Offshore soldier approaches Glória to goad her into betraying Fernando in exchange for an advantage in the Process. Meanwhile, Joana and Michele successfully steal the bomb from Silas but Michele betrays the Cause for her brother by giving the bomb to Marcela. As she heads back to the Offshore, Marcela instructs Cássia to pick her up when she arrives. Glória secretly meets Fernando and agrees to help him hide. The two share a kiss, and it is revealed that Fernando lost his ability to walk from falling off a building as he played with Glória when they were children, even though she had a chance to warn him about the loose brick that caused his fall. He tells her that he always knew about the brick because her mother told him what happened. The Offshore soldiers find Fernando just as Glória returns with dinner and Fernando believes that she sold him out. In charge of searching Fernando, Rafael allows him to pass the security check with a hidden radio. Joana is captured by the militia of Gerson, the father of the child she killed before the events of the first season.
15	7	"Chapter 07: Mist"	Jotagá Crema	Teodoro Poppovic	April 27, 2018
Elisa asks Rafael to return to the Offshore with her, out of concern regarding his recent "kidnap" incident but Rafael turns it down. As Fernando remains locked in a cell, Rafael approaches him and insists that he did not betray the Cause, even though all of the Cause members believe otherwise. Michele returns to the Offshore and is subjected to a simulation test to wipe her memories regarding the truth of Ezequiel's death, but she resists it and manages to wake herself up, knock Cássia unconscious, set her brother free and escape with him. At the registration booth, Elisa tends to a man who refuses to cooperate and is taken aback when she sees his face. It turns out that Elisa had long ago found out about Rafael's fake identity (his actual name is Tiago) and when she confronted him, Rafael still withheld the truth about the Cause from her. She recognizes this man, the real Rafael, and clears him, who is now assuming a fake identity. When Rafael goes to the registration booth to learn about the data storage process from Elisa, she gets upset at him and it is revealed that his brother, the real Rafael, had stolen the identity of their younger brother. As Elisa tells Rafael he started a "tradition" within his family and that she pities his youngest brother, who won't have anyone to steal the register from, a Cause member suddenly appears and tries to kill Rafael, but Rafael kills him first, not without injuring Elisa. Elisa survives and she begs Rafael to follow her and return to Offshore, to which he agrees only to leave her at the very end. Joana manages to free herself from captivity. While trying to escape the militia compound, Joana bumps into Marco, who is revealed to be alive following his failure in the previous Process (see Chapter 04: Gateway for details).
16	8	"Chapter 08: Frogs"	Dani Libardi	Denis Nielsen	April 27, 2018
Marco chains Joana up, spewing words of hatred towards her as he feels that Joana is the one who brought the misery upon him. In a flashback, Marco is shown being treated by the Offshore medical team after he was maimed by heavy doors during the Process. He was sent back to the Inland after being set up with prosthetic legs and a walking stick but he was too ashamed to return to his family and attempted to join the militia instead. After surprising Gerson and passing his admission tests, he is granted a place, but after ten months he's still treated like a maid. Gerson plans to publicly execute Joana, but she convinces Marco to let her go. When Gerson confronts him about doing so, Marco kills him, takes over the militia and goes back home, stating he will call the shots there from now on. He also arranges a meeting with Marcela, who is revealed to be his mother. He offers her vital information about the Cause's new plan in exchange for a second shot at the Process. Instructed by Fernando, who is able to use the radio Rafael secretly allowed him to keep, Joana goes to the frog basement to meet Rafael but she sees Silas and it is revealed that Silas sold Joana out to obtain more fertilizer. Rafael arrives and Silas is about to shoot him when Joana pushes Silas away into the pond of frogs, and he dies from the poison. Meanwhile, Michele and André are running to a hideout linked to the Founding Couple to avoid Cássia's pursuit. After struggling with his memory, André remembers the password and they locate a room with three chairs overlooking the ocean.
17	9	"Chapter 09: Necklace"	Jotagá Crema	Juliana Rojas	April 27, 2018
In flashbacks, the Founding Trio, Laís, Vítor, and Samira are working on a project to create a utopia for everyone to live in, sponsored by the rich and powerful. The rest of the population lives in dire states and is on the brink of a civil war. Samira's father is one of the sponsors and he asks the Trio to expedite the migration even though the Offshore is not ready to sustain the large population yet. He suggests making the scientists currently on the island leave, but the Trio refuses to comply, saying the Offshore is for competent people and not for rich morons to manipulate their way in. By blocking access to the island, Samira negotiates with the sponsors, requesting they build an Offshore unit in the Inland. However, Laís and Vítor are unwilling to go back to the Inland and start everything from scratch again, so they suggest blowing up the Inland's power plant to destroy the banking data, causing the rich to lose their status. They argue and Samira gets killed. Laís and Vítor proceed with their plan, forming the present day Founding Couple and way of governance. In the present, Michele learns of the Founding Trio, and André recovers his memory — he knew of the Founding Trio but stood by the Founding Couple's ideology, hence he did indeed commit a murder: he killed his mentor Olavo when he wanted to inform the Council about the truth. Later, Marcela subjected him to the memory suppression procedure used with Michele in the second-to-last episode in order to hide the truth and he was later locked up. Michele says the Offshore and the Process must end and leaves after hearing Rafael's plan over the comm, wearing the necklace she collected from Samara's skeleton, which contains a small shell. Rafael smuggles Joana into the Process facility and passes a ring to Fernando to break out and destroy the power supply, shutting down security cameras so that Joana can destroy the data while Rafael destroys the backup. Eventually, Fernando learns it was his own father who sold him out to the agents.
18	10	"Chapter 10: Blood"	Philippe Barcinski	Guilherme Freitas	April 27, 2018
Marcela tightens up security but Fernando manages to carry out his part successfully without being detected. However, Joana gets chased by Marco, and Fernando has to take over her role. Fernando cuts himself to let his blood contaminate the data and becomes very weak from losing too much blood. Joana becomes trapped in Michele's glass maze, where she confronts and knocks Marco out. When he wakes up, Marcela says that was his "second shot" and expels him from the Process building, deeming him unworthy. He is last seen destroying objects in his house, including his mother's portrait. Joana rescues Fernando and goes into hiding with him. Meanwhile, Rafael has trouble accessing the backup data room, but Michele appears and claims that she wants to help, opening the doors with the necklace. However, as they are in the room, Michele knocks Rafael unconscious. She then proceeds to move the backup data to another storage device. At the same time, Marcela manages to restore the power supply, but all the data has already been wiped. Discontent begins to rise among the Process participants as they are denied entry due to the data loss and they break into the facility, clashing with Marcela and her agents. Joana and Fernando take the opportunity to escape among the chaos. Michele goes to meet Councilor Nair to make a deal for the backup data. Unaware that Michele sabotaged their plan, Joana and Fernando celebrate with the Cause. Rafael regains consciousness and contacts Joana, informing her about the sabotage and that the Process will be carrying on. After an argument of making hurtful jabs at each other, Rafael seems to have enough of everything and goes back to seek a reunion with Elisa. Back at the Process facility, the protesters are about to get gunned down when Councilor Nair announces the start of Process 105. It is revealed that Michele had made a deal to hold onto the data and only releasing it once a year during the Process, in exchange for Offshore supplies for the Inland. Marcela cruelly mocks Marco for failing once again. The Process candidates take their tests. Joana burns Silas' body. Rafael comes clean to Elisa. Michele invites Fernando to help her with her ultimate plan - to use the supplies to build a third, new location as an alternative to both the Inland and the Offshore: the Shell.

=== Season 3 (2019) ===
No. overall	No. in season	Title	Directed by	Written by	Original release date
19	1	"Chapter 01: Sand"	Daina Giannecchini	Denis Nielsen & Pedro Aguilera	June 7, 2019
Michele succeeds in building the Shell, an alternative to both the Offshore and the Inland. When she switches the power on for the first time, reactions vary elsewhere. Joana says they are just another enemy; Fernando's father warns people against going there; Marco contemplates the light while one of his lieutenants comments that they'll lose power; and Marcela and Nair watch from the Offshore. Some time later, Fernando has been killed by pro-Offshore extremists when trying to invite people to the Shell and his wheelchair is kept on display inside the place as a monument to him; Elisa and Rafael are among the residents, now that Rafael's status as a Cause member was unveiled to the Offshore. Elisa acts as a nurse and Rafael drinks and does nothing all day, besides watching over his little brother Artur. Marco moved in with his son Mauricio, as well. One day, Joana visits the place and Xavier, a resident who belongs to a family whose members have never been able to pass the Process, shows her around and she insists to know more about the facility's generator. A massive sandstorm ravages the Shell, damaging its vital mechanisms, including the water collecting system, but Michele pleads the residents to join forces and rebuild the place, since their supplies are still intact. However, during Xavier's turn at watching over them, he is locked inside a room by a Shell drone and somebody steals almost all the food. Tension rises among residents as the Shell's unsustainability becomes obvious. Marco offers Michele the list of 20 people who left the Shell the night the supplies were stolen and suggests they go after them to retrieve the supplies. Gloria, on the other hand, recommends her to implement a new process to decide who's worthy of staying. Also, André and Marcela learn about the situation and offer to recover the place in exchange for ceding control of it to the Offshore. Michele ultimately decides to start a selection process to save the Shell by reducing its inhabitants to 10%. Those who stay should help rebuild it so that, later, everyone can be welcome again. As the selection's first test, people are told to remove their registers in order to cut all ties to the Offshore, leading some to abandon the selection and, consequently the Shell. Elisa offers Marco to be listed among residents who need medical treatment and who are consequently exempt from the selection, but he refuses. Joana grabs Michele's communicator from her and uses its shell to remove her register, promising to stay only "to see her fail".
20	2	"Chapter 02: Scalpel"	Dani Libardi	Carol Rodrigues	June 7, 2019
Joana gathers all former Cause members and reveals that she wants to use the Shell's generator to destroy the Offshore with an EMP, but Natalia is initially reluctant and still believes in the Shell. Michele tells Joana about Marcela's offer and that she had refused it, and that the selection is the solution to save the Shell, but Joana is even less trustful of Michele now that she knows she's been in contact with the Offshore. Joana, Marco and Rafael pass their next test where they have to work as a trio in order to collectively overcome temporary disabilities to which each of them is subjected. The next test eliminates people based on how they react to failure; Otávio loses his mind over failing the test and threatens to kill Michele with a blade. Joana manages to talk him out of it, but Rafael interrupts them culminating in Michele's throat being slit and Otávio committing suicide. Earlier in the episode, it is revealed that Otávio was Elisa's former lover, but their relationship came to an end when she passed the Process but he failed. Joana has a chance to leave Michele for dead. She thinks about it but saves her instead. Later, Natalia recognizes that the selection process messes with people's minds and agrees to help Joana with her plan. As Artur goes to sleep, he checks on a serious bruise on his left arm.
21	3	"Chapter 03: Medicine"	Daina Giannecchini	Ivan Nakamura	June 7, 2019
One year prior to the events of the season, the 'real' Rafael reveals his older brother's status as a Cause member, forcing him to grab Elisa and flee. Rafael goes back home for shelter, but his mother expels him. Artur follows him and begs him to take care of him, since he can't stand living with their mother anymore. Back in the present, Elisa attempts to contact the Offshore to check the possibility of coming back, but André takes the call and says she is not welcome there anymore now that she's a suspect of treason. Artur's condition worsens and he admits the bruise was caused after an ill-fated attempt to re-implant his register so he could one day go to the Offshore. Elisa treats him and realizes the register is broken, putting an end to his dream. While recovering, Michele assigns Elisa as her replacement in conducting the next test. Feeling better, she resumes work on the selection and prepares yet another step, which consists in trios deciding on a rule to expel someone in the trio in the next room. Gloria, Joana and Artur are up against Rafael, Natalia and Marco. After intense debating, Joana's group decides on a criterion based on whether the person has already killed someone (so that Marco is eliminated) while Rafael's group proposes (under his protests) a criterion based on age, with the youngest having to leave - so that Artur is eliminated. In the end, Michele reveals they will actually have to apply their criteria to their own groups, resulting in Joana's and Natalia's elimination. However, Artur ends up eliminated, as well, after Elisa tells Michele about the register. On his way out, he berates Rafael and later Elisa reveals she did it as payback for Rafael making her a treason suspect.
22	4	"Chapter 04: Duck"	Dani Libardi	Andréa Midori Simão	June 7, 2019
Only 100 people are left in the Shell and rationing of meals is getting extreme. Michele intends to reduce the population by a half as a last selection. Duos are to present ideas of a test and Michele chooses one. For Rafael and Marco, the test is a coin toss, Rafael's idea, and Marco loses. For Gloria and Xavier, the last candidates, the test is to assemble a puzzle box. Both finish virtually at the same time, but Michele decides Xavier was first. Marco goes to live on the streets of the Inland with Mauricio, and Gloria is told by Joana about Marcela's proposal. Gloria then goes meet Marcela, who suggests to her that she invade the Shell, and she is last seen communicating with the eliminated candidates to reveal the proposal Michele hid from everyone. In flashbacks, as the 10th Process was underway, it is shown how the early Offshore Council realized they were running out of supplies and that a method to further reduce the local population was urgent. The Founding Couple proposed the sterilization policy which is in use up to the present, but the Council wanted to expand it so it affected children born in the Offshore as well, resulting in all of them being sent to the Inland until they were 20 and became eligible to go through the Process. 11 years later, Tânia, the daughter of the Founding Couple, turns 20 and enters the Process, but fails her first test and is eliminated despite begging for her parents' mercy. Later, she is seen founding The Cause.
23	5	"Chapter 05: Lever"	Dani Libardi	Denis Nielsen	June 7, 2019
One year ago, following the disbandment of the Militia, Marco leaves his house with Mauricio for the Shell, where he registers both without a surname. Back to the present, he resorts to stealing to feed his son, but his first attempt ends up with him being beaten up. He decides to leave the child back at home (where his maid Larissa can care for him) and joins Gloria, who's leading an uprising against the Shell. She even fantasizes about becoming a new Founding Couple together with Marco, although he isn't initially interested. Joana and Natalia try to talk her out of working with the Offshore, but they flee as Gloria threatens to hand them over to the Division. The duo finds shelter in an abandoned bus, where Joana expresses frustration over letting so many people down and admits her involvement in Silas' death (see Season 2's Chapter 08: Frogs for details), but Natalia insists she cares about others more than most. They almost share a kiss, but Joana resists. Soon after, they argue over what to do next and Natalia leaves her alone. Gloria and dozens of former Shell inhabitants march towards the place and force their way in while the remaining residents mount barricades to hold them off. Once Michele realizes they won't resist much longer, she reluctantly activates the Shell's defense mechanism (now that the generator is back and running) and Marco ends up electrocuted. He survives and Gloria's group takes over the Shell while Michele flees alone. Rafael tries to take Elisa with him, but she says she'll stay even at the risk of having her memory wiped by Marcela as a punishment for her deserting, revealing she would rather forget about him. Rafael injures his foot while fleeing and is forced to hide inside the Shell. Meanwhile, it is revealed that one of the councilors is Marcela's father, and he tells her he is disappointed that Marco took out his great-grandson's implant. Marcela promises to solve the situation and preserve their family's honor and legacy. She informs Marco she will take over the Shell in 24 hours as he delivers a speech and is hailed by the Shell's population. Gloria mentions his surname, which the crowd echoes repeatedly and Marco accepts it again.
24	6	"Chapter 06: Trapdoor"	Jotagá Crema	Ivan Nakamura	June 7, 2019
The Shell's population demands food and Marco offers it as a reward for whoever manages to capture Michele, Joana, Rafael or Natalia. The latter is caught and locked up. Meanwhile, Elisa secretly treats Rafael's wound and is approached by Marco and Gloria, who offer her a place back at the Offshore if she reveals the fugitives' whereabouts. André later contacts her and confirms the proposal. Michele arrives at Joana's bus, but is told to leave. Joana investigates a piece of the Shell's water collecting system which Natalia found earlier and realizes it had been sabotaged so the sandstorm would rip it off. She finds a passed out Michele far in the desert, wakes her up and discusses her discovery. They recognize their own mistakes and form a reluctant allegiance in order to take back the Shell, which is now heavily guarded by Gloria and Marco's people. Via radio, Michele instructs Rafael to open the trapdoor so she can secretly enter, but since he struggles to walk, he asks Elisa to do it instead, though she initially refuses. In order to buy time, Michele surrenders and is brought in. In flashbacks, Elisa and Otávio take part in the 99th Process and go through a test in which candidates have dinner and have to influence another person to do something before being influenced themselves. Elisa is approached by André who offers her information on her influence target in exchange for information on Otávio, his target. Elisa eventually gives in, and André successfully influences Otávio, causing him to be eliminated. Both André and Elisa would later be among the 3%. Back to the present, Elisa decides not to play the Offshore's game again and lets Joana in.
25	7	"Chapter 07: Gardrone"	Jotagá Crema	Ricardo Gonçalves	June 7, 2019
Gloria puts Michele on trial and despite the latter's pleas, the people declare her to be guilty, and Gloria decides that the sentence will be to send her back to the Offshore so that her brain is erased. Before she leaves, she asks Gloria to remove Fernando's wheelchair from the Shell, since it is now becoming the exact opposite of what he envisioned; Gloria is later seen crying next to it. Constantly watched by Marco's henchman Wander, Elisa manages to sneak past and meet with Joana and Rafael. They figure out a specific saw was used to sabotage the Shell, and Elisa pinpoints the exact date and time when the saboteur gained access to the tools' room, but their name is still unknown. They first suspect Marco, but Elisa says he was undergoing treatment for his injuries that night. Then they suggest Gloria, but Rafael checks security footage of that night and it registers the sound of a rebec, Gloria being the only person in the Shell capable of playing it. Elisa scans the saw for DNA and comes up with a list of ten people who touched the tool, Rafael and Xavier included. The latter is kidnapped for interrogation, and he suggests they look at the recording of the Gardrone. After Joana captures it, she witnesses Tadeu telling Gloria that "they did it". Artur deduces Rafael's hideout after spotting some grease on Elisa's sandals, and he meets Raphael who convinces him to stay to see the truth. When they all look at the Gardrone footage, they see Rafael with the saw, who is surprised. In flashbacks, Gloria is seen succeeding in the penultimate test of the Process. Marcela informs her that Fernando is about to die after being seriously beaten up as he tried to recruit people for the Shell and gives her a choice between continuing in the Process or abandoning it to treat him. Gloria chooses the second option.
26	8	"Chapter 08: Wave"	Jotagá Crema	Andréa Midori Simão & Pedro Aguilera	June 7, 2019
Marcela meets her father, who insists his illness developed out of sheer frustration for Marco's failure in passing the Process and Mauricio's register removal. Rafael disputes being the saboteur, despite the footage showing otherwise. To make his situation worse, Artur says he witnessed him waking up and leaving the dorms the night the sandstorm happened. Because at that time the registers were still active, he has a theory that maybe he was remote-controlled. Records show that there was indeed a transmission at that time. When the (inaudible) transmission is replayed, Rafael gets up. After changing the speed of the recording, they hear "get up, find a saw, cut the reeling cable". In flashbacks, it is revealed that when his brother (the real Rafael) sold him out to Marcela, he was subjected to a memory control programming. Rafael and Joana show the recording to Marco and Gloria just as the Division arrives with food and water, but Gloria doesn't care. Marco orders that they be locked up, and later says he destroyed the recording. Marcela re-implants a register on Mauricio, who is now renamed Leonardo, after Marcela's father. Wander tries to capture Elisa, but she tranquilizes him and frees everyone. While they run, Joana meets Marco who hands her back the recording. Joana plays the recording for all to listen, and the Shell population turns against the Division, who is forced to leave in a hurry. Rafael is almost killed by a former Division mate, but Artur knocks her out and saves him. André and Michele stumble upon each other, recognize they are blinded by their respective ideologies and split. Marcela tries to retrieve her grandson, but she is caught and locked up, not before Marco tells his mother that his son is never going to the Offshore. She is given a meal inside her cage and finds among the food a note saying she has a female ally inside the Shell. Joana and Natalia reconcile and share a kiss. Gloria apologizes to Michele. Andre and the Division take over the Council and say "now it's war". Back in the Shell Joana tells the others that they should attack first by destroying the Offshore with an EMP, just like the Founding Couple did with the Inland.

=== Season 4 (2020) ===
No. overall	No. in season	Title	Directed by	Written by	Original release date
27	1	"Chapter 01: Moon"	Daina Giannecchini	Teodoro Poppovic	August 14, 2020
Offshore: André invites a diplomatic mission from the Shell to visit the Offshore and asks them to release Marcela and the other soldiers being held prisoners, as well as to officially endorse the Process. Negotiations are postponed until the next day, and the team is offered a place to sleep at the house of one of the soldiers they've been holding prisoner. The group sees an opportunity to carry out their plan of disabling the Offshore's technologies with an EMP pulse. Marco, Rafael, Elisa, Natalia and Joana leave for the mission which is kept a secret from the Shell's population. Their plan is to hide parts of an EMP bomb inside Marco's prosthetic legs. Then, they will secretly place the turbine needed for the bomb in a medical refrigerator in the Inland so the Offshore personnel will inadvertently take it back with them. The team meets with Andre, telling him they actually want the Process to end. Joana (who never knew her birth name) has visions of a little girl named Luana and wonders if her mother, whom she never met, is in the Offshore. Natalia deliberately cuts her own hand in order to gain access to the Offshore's medical center with Elisa so they can check if the turbine has arrived. Joana is supposed to keep personnel from the area, but ends up accessing a computer to look for her mother. She finds a potential match in a woman named Veronica, who shows up behind her and takes her to meet the Council. Shell: Marcela comments about the mission to Michele, who then confronts Gloria, believing she informed Marcela about the mission and the plan, which Gloria denies. Michele tasks Xavier with placing the turbine in the refrigerator inside the medical unit. Gloria accompanies him, and they see Fernando's father Antonio receiving an object from the soldiers. Xavier is caught when a bottle drops nearby, and he has to leave before finishing the job. Gloria says the bottle was thrown by some kids, but Xavier later tells Michele he believes it was Gloria herself.
28	2	"Chapter 02: Shock"	Diana Giannecchni	Natalia Maeda	August 14, 2020
Inland/Process: The object given to Antonio in the previous episode is a holographic projector that shows some footage of the Offshore, including images of the Shell's diplomatic mission enjoying some of the place's amenities. André then announces the Process will be held tomorrow. With the local medical unit full of people, Michele has to devise an alternate plan to send the turbine to the Offshore. Since Xavier is 20 years old, she tells him that he should enter the Process so that he can let her inside to place the turbine in a refrigerator inside the Process compound. Since his family has a history of always failing very early in the Process, Michele trains him with memories of her very own training under the Old Man and Ezequiel. Xavier barely passes his first test (the interview), being forced to reveal his mission to help destroy the Offshore, which catches the interviewer's attention. Later, he meets Pedro, a cocky guy who taunts him for his bad family history, and who also becomes his partner for the next test. Xavier's quick thinking during the test after Pedro passes out secures them a spot in the next round. Meanwhile, Denise (who interviewed Xavier) questions André about subjecting the candidates to that test so early and, he explains it will help them get rid of "the weak". Offshore: The Council tells Joana that André has imprisoned those who oppose him. They tell her that if anyone tries to escape their holding cell a high-frequency alarm is triggered directly inside the person's implant, paralyzing them. They seek Joana's help in escaping since Joana's group doesn't have implants and will not be affected. As a condition Joana demands they abolish the Process and leaves when they hesitate. Veronica later pays the team a visit and announces that the Council has agreed to end the Process. The group discusses sticking to the original plan or seizing this new opportunity, and the majority decides for the latter. Shell: Gloria and Marcela negotiate an allegiance and the latter suggests Gloria is still going through the Process and helping her escape could be a test.
29	3	"Chapter 03: Fire"	Jotagá Crema	Carol Rodriguez & Ivan Nakamura	August 14, 2020
Shell: Gloria demands that Marcela allow her to take a second person with her to the Offshore and says if she doesn't comply, the Offshore will be destroyed. Gloria lets her see her grandson Mauricio one last time, though Marcela secretly instructs Larissa to escape the Shell with him. After they leave, Gloria reveals Michele's plan to Marcela and helps her and the others escape. As they head to the exit, Marcela announces her final test is to burn down the Shell. Gloria reveals the second spot is not for Marco, as Marcela deduced, but for her unborn child. Process: Michele and Xavier's plan works but she tells him not to wait another day to get eliminated in order not to raise suspicion. André announces to all candidates that their next test is to capture Michele. A group formed by Xavier, Pedro and a third candidate manages to locate her and bring her to André. Before heading back to the Offshore, Marcela tells Gloria that only she will be considered part of the 3% and her child will have to go through the Process at the age of 20 like everyone else. Offshore: Rafael sticks to the original plan and goes to a party in order to approach someone who could help them. Cássia sits next to him and she tells him about her struggles to adapt to the Offshore, while he has a memory of his recruitment to the Cause by Ivana on his 20th birthday. The two have sex and Rafael tries to steal her ring while she sleeps. She catches him, but lets him go saying he'll fail to change anything but should "believe while he still can". The rest of the team succeeds in breaking out the Council members after Rafael provides them with weapons he stole with the ring. Later, Rafael reluctantly surrenders the weapons and the ring to the Council while Veronica tells Joana she never had any children. Nair and Veronica demand that André return to the Offshore, but he tells them of the Shell's plan and pressures them to pick a side.
30	4	"Chapter 04: Submarine"	Jotagá Crema	Denis Nielsen	August 14, 2020
In flashbacks, Silas tells Natalia that a woman named Tânia founded the Cause as she prepares to infiltrate the Process with a bomb. In another flashback, Elisa, Marco, Gloria, Michele, Joana, Xavier, Natalia and Rafael discuss a plan B in case their original plan fails. Michele tells them of the underground bunker she and André hid in and that they can use the Founding Trio's submarine to return to the Inland. Back in the present, André allows Michele to see the Shell burning and offers her a final chance to join the Offshore. When she refuses he locks her up with the Old Man. In the Offshore Veronica and some guards try to arrest Joana, Marco, Rafael, Natalia and Elisa, but Rafael manages to trigger the high frequency alarm, stunning the guards and allowing them to escape. Once inside the secret bunker, they locate the submarine, but it needs fuel. They consider using the bomb parts hidden in Marco's leg to power the submarine, but Joana suggests that they use those parts to convert the submarine into an EMP bomb. They try to make contact with the Shell, but Marcela intercepts their communication and tells them they have 10 minutes to surrender. They then tap into the Process' building camera system and see that the Shell is on fire. They vote to activate the bomb disabling all electronic systems throughout the Offshore.
31	5	"Chapter 05: Painting"	Dani Libardi	Denis Nielsen, Natalia Maeda & Pedro Aguilera	August 14, 2020
The EMP pulse not only disables all electronic systems in the Offshore, it also causes a radiation leak at the local nuclear power plant. Marcela informs Nair that they have a maximum of one or two weeks before it reaches lethal levels. Meanwhile, Joana, Natalia, Elisa, Rafael and Marco are arrested. In the jungle Marco escapes after creating a distraction and rolls down a hill, disappearing in the dense jungle. Later, he is seen in his mother's house holding Leonardo at gunpoint, but the old man invites him to cook something with him. Marcela arrives at her house to collect her father, but is invited to join them in their meal. Eventually, she tells them they must leave, but Leonardo and Marco want to stay. After vain attempts to convince them otherwise, Marcela leaves. Later, Marco is walking on the beach and starts coughing up blood, and he begins to laugh and lays down on the beach. The Offshore population, joined by Joana's group, is evacuated in three submarines that are still functional because they were docked at the Process' compound. Nair is seen sitting in the Council room, having chosen to stay and die. Meanwhile, in the Process compound, the candidates take a test, but when it finishes, there's no response from the Process personnel and they riot, demanding explanations.
32	6	"Chapter 06: Buttons"	Diana Giannecchini	Carol Rodriguez	August 14, 2020
André has the compound locked down and prevents the Offshore refugees from entering the facility. Marcela tries to intervene, but the soldiers are more loyal to André and obey his orders to lock her up with Michele and the Old Man. As Andre's subordinates pressure him for instructions on what to do with both the refugees and the candidates, the latter group forces their way out of the test room and demands explanations. André has Rafael, Elisa, Natalia and Joana sit in electrical chairs while he gives Xavier, Pedro and two other candidates buttons for them to execute the four, with Michele in a separate room looking on. After some hesitation, all candidates press their respective buttons and are declared Offshore citizens by André. As Xavier and Pedro attempt to remove the bodies, the four awaken. It is revealed that Gloria, Ariel and Xavier secretly lowered the chairs' voltage so the group would just pass out and not be electrocuted. Everyone evacuates the compound, except for Michele, who stays to announce the Offshore's end to the Inland residents. André stands in her way and she reluctantly shoots him in the shoulder in order to advance. After she makes her announcement, André is gone, but he soon emerges and stabs her. As she dies in his arms, he has a vision of the Founding Couple saying they're proud of him, and then he leaves.
33	7	"Chapter 07: Sun"	Dani Libardi	Ivan Nakamura, Denis Nielsen & Pedro Aguilera	August 14, 2020
Flashbacks: In the 28th year of the Process, a Council member reports increasing Cause activity in the Inland and proposes they create the Division in order to protect themselves. The Founding Couple propose instead they make a test where the leaders of the Offshore and the Cause will face each other and prove, once and for all, who is best, but their proposal is unanimously rejected. Vitor is revealed to be terminally ill and wants to return to the Inland in order to see Tânia one last time. Laís goes there instead and asks Tânia to come back with her, but she refuses. Soon after, Laís is killed in a shootout between Cause members and Division soldiers. Cause members want to investigate an object Laís brought with her, but Tânia orders it to be buried along with her mother. Vitor dies soon after and the Council member proposes that their fates be kept secret but use their images as martyrs. Present day: Tension rises between the militia and the 3%, led by André and supported by Antonio and his many followers. Joana and Natalia track the Old Man to ask him about Tânia, whom he knew as a child. He recalls Tânia mentioning an object before she died and gives them its location. The duo finds Laís's tomb there and retrieves the object: a holographic projector containing details on the test proposed by Laís and Vitor. Just as a battle is about to begin, Joana emerges and reveals the test to everyone. It will involve six candidates; Joana puts herself as the first contestant and is joined by Xavier, Veronica, Marcela, Rafael and André. The test is a guessing game and Joana and André are the last candidates standing. Joana proposes that in case she wins, everyone should assemble inside the Process compound for the first general meeting of a new, unified world. She guesses André's colour correctly but he has Pedro shoot the projector before it can determine if she was right. All factions continue their battle preparations but, as the next day dawns, no conflict happens and everyone gathers inside the Process compound as proposed by Joana. André boards a submarine at the Process compound despite warnings of insufficient oxygen. He has a vision of Michele cuddling him as the submarine sinks to the bottom.
