= Verão 90 =

Brazilian telenovela

- Also known as: The Incredible '90s
- Genre: Telenovela; Romantic comedy
- Created by: Izabel de Oliveira; Paula Amaral
- Written by: Daisy Chaves; Isabel Muniz; João Brandão; Luciane Reis
- Directed by: Jorge Fernando; Marcelo Zambelli
- Starring: Isabelle Drummond; Rafael Vitti; Jesuíta Barbosa; Cláudia Raia; Dira Paes; Camila Queiroz; Klebber Toledo; Humberto Martins; Débora Nascimento; Totia Meireles; Caio Paduan; Marina Moschen; Barbara França; Dandara Mariana; Alexandre Borges
- Opening theme: "Pump Up the Jam" by Technotronic
- Country of origin: Brazil
- Original language: Portuguese
- No. of episodes: 154 (110 International version)

Production
- Camera setup: Multi-camera
- Running time: 36–49 minutes
- Production company: Estúdios Globo

Original release
- Network: Rede Globo
- Release: 29 January – 26 July 2019

Verão 90 (English title: The Incredible '90s) is a Brazilian telenovela produced and broadcast by Globo. It premiered on 29 January 2019, replacing O Tempo Não Para, and ended on 26 July 2019, being replaced by Bom Sucesso. It was created by Izabel de Oliveira and Paula Amaral in collaboration with Daisy Chaves, Isabel Muniz, João Brandão, and Luciane Reis. It was directed by Ana Paula Guimarães, Diego Morais, and Tila Teixeira, with the general direction of Jorge Fernando and Marcelo Zambelli and the artistic direction of Jorge Fernando. Verão 90 features Isabelle Drummond, Rafael Vitti, Jesuíta Barbosa, Cláudia Raia, Dira Paes, Klebber Toledo, Humberto Martins, and Camila Queiroz in the main roles.

== Plot ==
In 1980, when she was only ten years old, Manuzita was the host of her own television program, but she is forced to start a contest to find a co-star or the show would be canceled. Brothers João and Jerônimo sneak off to the auditions and are both chosen. The trio form the group Patotinha Mágica, which became a huge national success. While Manuzita and João gained attention as a couple, Jerônimo was left out by the press and develops a hatred for his brother. During a huge performance, João gets sick and faints onstage. His mother (Dira Paes) is accused of negligence and the case ends up in the main newspapers, causing the termination of advertising contracts and the group to disband. Ten years later, in 1990, Manu (Isabelle Drummond) is an actress, but has not been successful and tries to regain her fame, accepting any work to achieve it. João (Rafael Vitti) is the host of a radio program and Jerônimo (Jesuíta Barbosa) has gambling debts. When her car breaks down, Manu is reunited with João and they begin to date, causing jealousy from Jerônimo.

Also seeking fame, Jerônimo returned to Rio de Janeiro, lying that he was the son of diplomats, to win the friendship of millionaires Quinzinho (Caio Paduan), Candé (Kayky Brito) and Tobé (Bernardo Marinho), with the help of scammer Galdino (Gabriel Godoy) and lover Vanessa (Camila Queiroz). Despite his lie being discovered, Jerônimo got a high position at PopTV, as compensation when he helped free Quinzinho from jail, after he accidentally caused the death of VJ Nicole (Barbara France), setting up João to be arrested instead. Three years have passed and, in 1993, João has the chance to prove his innocence when he is released, much to the dismay of Jerônimo, who managed not only to maintain his standard of living, but also to stay with Manu. In addition, Vanessa returns from abroad to take revenge on her ex-lover after he left her in the past.

== Cast ==
- Isabelle Drummond as Manuela Renata Andrade (Manu / Manuzita)
- Rafael Vitti as João Guerreiro
- Jesuíta Barbosa as Jerônimo Guerreiro / Rojê Guerreiro
- Cláudia Raia as Lidiane Andrade / Lidi Pantera
- Dira Paes as Janaína Guerreiro
- Humberto Martins as Herculano Mendes / Hércules Gatão
- Camila Queiroz as Vanessa Dias
- Klebber Toledo as Patrick Vandenbergh Brasil
- Flávio Tolezani as Raimundo
- Débora Nascimento as Gisela Ferreira Lima Mendes (Gigi)
- Fabiana Karla as Madalena Sampaio (Madá)
- Marcos Veras as Álamo Sampaio
- Alexandre Borges as Joaquim Ferreira Lima (Quinzão)
- Totia Meireles as Mercedes Ferreira Lima
- Caio Paduan as Joaquim Ferreira Lima Filho (Quinzinho)
- Marina Moschen as Larissa Almeida de Castro Gomes
- Kayky Brito as Carlos André Almeida de Castro Gomes (Candé)
- Cláudia Ohana as Janice Guerreiro
- Miguel Rômulo as Leonardo Farias / Sabrina
- Sérgio Malheiros as Diego Guerreiro Pereira
- Jeniffer Nascimento as Cristina Moura (Kika)
- Gabriel Godoy as Galdino Camargo
- Luiz Henrique Nogueira as Jofre Araújo (Jofre Cachorrão)
- Marcelo Valle as Murilo Fraga
- Maria Carol Rebello as Diana Mendes
- Val Perré as Otoniel Pereira
- Dandara Mariana as Dandara Brasil
- Bernardo Marinho as Tobias Cassini (Tobé)
- Renata Motta Lima as Vera Regina
- Giovana Cordeiro as Moana Aguiar
- Marília Martins as Dirce
- Alexandre David as Floriano
- Ícaro Silva as Ticiano
- Marcela Siqueira as Tânia
- Renata Imbriani as Marta
- Felippe Luhan as Manjubinha
- Ivo Gandra as Codorna
- André Junqueira as Lacerda
- Lucas Domso as Jorge Figueira (“Figueirinha”)
- Orlando Caldeira as Catraca
- Duda Wendling as Isadora Ferreira Lima Mendes
- Alana Cabral as Clarissa Guerreiro Pereira
- Ronnie Marruda as a police officer

=== Guest cast ===
- Barbara França as Nicole Ferraz
- Lazuli Barbosa as Adriana
- Pamela Côto as Flavinha
- Tarcísio Filho as Alexander Hall, Duque de Kiev (Duke of Kiev)
- Adriana Machado as Marina

== Production ==
Originally entitled Anos Incríveis (Incredible Years), the telenovela began to be developed by Izabel de Oliveira and Paula Amaral in the second half of 2015 and had the synopsis approved in March 2016. Originally it was planned to premiere in January 2018, replacing Pega Pega. In February 2017, however, it was decided that it would premiere in the second half of 2018, giving its place to Deus Salve o Rei, as a strategy to compete with Record's historical dramas. In August 2017 the telenovela changed its name to Verão 90 Graus (Summer 90 Degrees) and later shortened to Verão 90 (Summer '90), since Anos Incríveis belonged to ABC as the title of the series The Wonder Years in Brazil. In March 2018 it was announced that Verão 90 would be postponed again, giving its place to O Tempo Não Para, which until then would be its replacement. The second postponement was due to the fact that the plot addresses the consequences of the Collor Plan, however it came up against the possible candidacy of Fernando Collor de Mello in the 2018 elections, which could be seen as negative propaganda. In addition, the broadcaster was having trouble obtaining the copyright for several music videos from the 1990s, as it intended to show part of them constantly during the story. Because of the postponements, several cast members ended up being moved to other telenovelas.

The telenovela initially would be directed by Natália Grimberg and Allan Fiterman, however, after the postponements, both moved to other projects, and were replaced by Jorge Fernando and Marcelo Zambelli. Verão 90 was the last telenovela directed by Jorge Fernando, who would pass away on 27 October 2019, three months after the last episode had aired. The sets of the telenovela were developed by the set designer José Claudio Ferreira, who took six months to produce them completely. The team's main difficulty was to faithfully reproduce the city of Rio de Janeiro in the 1990s, including famous places frequented by young people in addition to typical elements such as yellow pay phones and street signs of the time. Filming began in October 2018, and concluded in June 2019.

== Ratings ==
Season	Timeslot (BRT/AMT)	Episodes	First aired		Last aired		Avg. viewers (points)
Season	Timeslot (BRT/AMT)	Episodes	Date	Viewers (in points)	Date	Viewers (in points)	Avg. viewers (points)
1	Mon–Sat 7:30 p.m.	154	29 January 2019	24	26 July 2019	31	26

== Soundtrack ==
=== Volume 1 ===
Verão 90: Vol. 1

Soundtrack album by Various artists
- Released: 13 March 2019
- Length: 59:44
- Label: Som Livre

Verão 90: Vol. 1 is the first soundtrack of the telenovela, released on 13 March 2019 by Som Livre.

No.	Title	Artist(s)	Length
1.	"Pump Up the Jam"	Technotronic	3:36
2.	"Salve Simpatia"	Jorge Ben Jor	4:06
3.	"Acelerou"	Djavan	5:02
4.	"Toda Forma de Amor"	Lulu Santos	3:46
5.	"Preta"	Beto Barbosa	3:19
6.	"Your Love"	The Outfield	3:35
7.	"Uma Noite e Meia"	Marina Lima	4:41
8.	"Do Leme ao Pontal"	Tim Maia	4:06
9.	"The Best"	Tina Turner	4:09
10.	"Menino do Rio"	Baby do Brasil	4:26
11.	"Zanzibar"	A Cor do Som	3:22
12.	"Freak Le Boom Boom"	Gretchen	3:41
13.	"Good Vibrations"	Marky Mark and the Funky Bunch feat. Loleatta Holloway	4:29
14.	"Rio 40 Graus"	Fernanda Abreu	5:09
15.	"A Leveza do Amor"	Melissa Nóbrega	2:17
Total length:			59:44

=== Volume 2 ===
Verão 90: Vol. 2

Soundtrack album by Various artists
- Released: 5 April 2019
- Length: 56:10
- Label: Som Livre

Verão 90: Vol. 2 is the second soundtrack of the telenovela, released on 5 April 2019 by Som Livre.

No.	Title	Artist(s)	Length
1.	"Saideira"	Skank	3:47
2.	"Flores"	Titãs	3:26
3.	"Nós Vamos Invadir Sua Praia"	Ultraje a Rigor	4:15
4.	"Óculos"	Paralamas do Sucesso	3:38
5.	"Olhos Coloridos"	Sandra de Sá	4:26
6.	"Please Don’t Go"	Double You	3:17
7.	"Step By Step"	New Kids on the Block	4:27
8.	"It Must Have Been Love"	Roxette	4:18
9.	"Esotérico"	Gilberto Gil	4:22
10.	"As Canções que Você Fez pra Mim"	Maria Bethânia	3:44
11.	"Bem que se Quis"	Marisa Monte	3:30
12.	"Você"	Tim Maia	4:04
13.	"Repetition"	Information Society	4:34
14.	"The Rhythm of the Night"	Corona	4:22
Total length:			56:10

== Awards and nominations ==
Year	Award	Category	Nominated	Result	Ref.
2019	Melhores do Ano	Best Telenovela Actor	Jesuíta Barbosa	Won	
2019	Melhores do Ano	Best Revelation Actor	Orlando Caldeira	Nominated	
2019	Melhores do Ano	Character of the Year	Cláudia Raia	Won	

Preceded by O Tempo Não Para; 31 July 2018–28 January 2019	Globo 7 p.m. timeslot telenovela 29 January 2019–26 July 2019	Succeeded by Bom Sucesso; 29 July 2019–24 January 2020
