= Desperate Lies =

Brazilian drama television series

- Brazilian Portuguese: Pedaço de Mim
- Genre: Drama
- Created by: Ângela Chaves
- Written by: Ângela Chaves; Guilherme Vasconcelos; Laura Rissin; Marina Luísa Silva
- Directed by: Maurício Farias; Vicente Barcellos; Clara Kutner; Maria Clara Abreu
- Creative director: Maurício Farias´
- Starring: Juliana Paes; Vladimir Brichta
- Composers: Branco Mello; Fabio Góes
- Country of origin: Brazil
- Original language: Portuguese
- No. of seasons: 1
- No. of episodes: 17

Production
- Executive producers: Patricia Zerbinato; Samanta Moraes; Maíra Donoso
- Producers: Luiz Noronha; Cecilia Grosso
- Running time: 36–59 minutes
- Production company: A Fábrica

Original release
- Network: Netflix
- Release: 5 July 2024

Desperate Lies (Portuguese: Pedaço de Mim, lit. 'Piece of Me') is a Brazilian drama television series created by Ângela Chaves. It stars Juliana Paes, Vladimir Brichta, Felipe Abib and Paloma Duarte. It premiered on Netflix on 5 July 2024.

== Plot ==
Liana leaves her husband, Tomás, after finding out he had an affair with a friend. During a night out, Liana consumes drugs provided by Oscar, who subsequently sexually assaults her. Upon learning she is pregnant, Liana attempts to uncover the identity of the father, only to be shocked to learn she's carrying two babies with DNA from two different men.

== Cast ==
- Juliana Paes as Liana Azevedo Rosenthal
- Vladimir Brichta as Tomás Rosenthal
- Felipe Abib as Oscar Oliveira
  - Antonio Carrara as 19-year-old Oscar
- Paloma Duarte as Silvia Rosenthal França
- Martha Nowill as Débora Oliveira
- Jussara Freire as Norma Azevedo
- João Vitti as Vicente França
- Yohama Eshima as Cláudia Aguilar Nakamura
- Claudia Porvedel as Nina
- Joana Kannenberg as Patrícia
- Felipe Ricca as Kiko
- Rodrigo Cardozo as Isaias
- Antonio Grassi as Jonas Rosenthal
- José Beltrão as Marcos Azevedo Rosenthal
  - Theo Almeida as 10-year-old Marcos
- Pedro Manoel Nabuco as Mateus Azevedo Rosenthal
  - Enzo Diniz as 10-year-old Mateus
- Bento Veiga as Inácio Rosenthal
  - Vitor Valle as 12-year-old Inácio
- Dani Ornellas as Betina Camargo
- Nando Cunha as Sergio Camargo
- Agatha Marinho as Julia Camargo

== Episodes ==
No.	Title	Original release date
1	"More Than I Ever Wanted"	5 July 2024
2	"Eyes Wide Open"	5 July 2024
3	"A Love Divided"	5 July 2024
4	"In Pieces"	5 July 2024
5	"Tough Choices"	5 July 2024
6	"The Writing on the Wall"	5 July 2024
7	"Secrets and Shadows"	5 July 2024
8	"Uncomfortable Truths"	5 July 2024
9	"Never Again"	5 July 2024
10	"Picking Up the Pieces"	5 July 2024
11	"The Truth Will Set You Free"	5 July 2024
12	"Love and Fear"	5 July 2024
13	"Settling Scores"	5 July 2024
14	"The Truth Hurts"	5 July 2024
15	"Can Lies Heal?"	5 July 2024
16	"Cause and Effect"	5 July 2024
17	"My Other Half"	5 July 2024
