= 3% =

Brazilian TV series

- Genre: Drama; Thriller; Science fiction
- Created by: Pedro Aguilera
- Written by: Pedro Aguilera; Cássio Koshikumo; Denis Nielsen; Ivan Nakamura; Jotagá Crema; André Sirangelo; Juliana Rojas; Guilherme Freitas; Teodoro Poppovic; Carol Rodrigues; Andréa Midori Simão; Ricardo Gonçalves
- Directed by: César Charlone; Daina Giannecchini; Dani Libardi; Jotagá Crema; Philippe Barcinski
- Starring: João Miguel; Bianca Comparato; Michel Gomes; Rodolfo Valente; Cynthia Senek; Vaneza Oliveira; Rafael Lozano; Viviane Porto; Samuel de Assis; Laila Garin; Bruno Fagundes; Thais Lago; Amanda Magalhães; Fernando Rubro
- Country of origin: Brazil
- Original language: Portuguese
- No. of seasons: 4
- No. of episodes: 33

Production
- Executive producers: César Charlone; Tiago Mello
- Production locations: São Paulo; Brumadinho, Minas Gerais; Porto do Mangue, Rio Grande do Norte
- Running time: 36–74 minutes
- Production company: Boutique Filmes

Original release
- Network: Netflix
- Release: 25 November 2016 – 14 August 2020

3% (Brazilian Portuguese: [ˈtɾe(j)s puʁ ˈsẽtu]) is a Brazilian dystopian thriller television series created by Pedro Aguilera, starring João Miguel and Bianca Comparato. Developed from a 2009 independent pilot episode, it is the first Portuguese-language Netflix original series and the second non-English production, after the Spanish-language series Club de Cuervos.

The series is set in an unspecified future where 20-year-old individuals of the impoverished "Inland" have the single opportunity to complete "The Process" and advance to the affluence of the distant "Offshore" society. While most of the unsuccessful candidates are simply eliminated, some fail to survive, leading to only 3% of the candidates succeeding.

The first season, consisting of eight episodes, became available on Netflix worldwide on 25 November 2016. In December 2016, Netflix renewed the series for a second season, which was released on 27 April 2018, consisting of 10 episodes. In June 2018, the series was renewed for a third season, consisting of eight episodes, which was released on 7 June 2019. In August 2019, it was announced that the series had been renewed for a fourth and final season, which was released on 14 August 2020 and consists of seven episodes.

== Cast and characters ==
=== Main ===
- João Miguel as Ezequiel, the head of the Process. He is intense, mysterious, short-tempered, and conflicted by ideal extremes. (seasons 1–2)
- Bianca Comparato as Michele Santana, a smart and sly young woman who has a very strong sense of justice. She has no family and was raised by her brother, who did not return after being sent to the Process.(seasons 1–4)
- Michel Gomes as Fernando Carvalho, raised by his father, who fostered in him the singular purpose of passing the Process. A wheelchair user, Fernando is disdained by some candidates who do not believe in his chances to successfully complete the Process. (seasons 1–2)
- Rodolfo Valente as Rafael Moreira, egocentric, selfish, sarcastic, and willing to do anything to pass, even cheat. He hides his mysteries and believes the ends justify the means.(seasons 1–4)
- Cynthia Senek as Glória, Fernando's close childhood friend. (seasons 2–4)
- Vaneza Oliveira as Joana Coelho, an orphan who survived on her own at the margins of society, on the streets of the Inland. Intelligent and capable, she interacts with very few candidates and shows little interest in the Process.
- Rafael Lozano as Marco Álvares, from a family known to always pass the Process and who are waiting for him in the Offshore.
- Viviane Porto as Aline, a young and ambitious employee of the Council, with the mission to overthrow Ezequiel and become the next head of the Process. (season 1; guest season 2)
- Samuel de Assis as Silas, a compassionate Inland doctor, but also a member of the Cause. (season 2; guest season 4)
- Laila Garin as Marcela Álvares, Offshore's military commander, and later, the head of the Process. (seasons 2–4)
- Bruno Fagundes as André Santana, Michele's brother and the first Offshore citizen to commit a murder. (seasons 2–4)
- Thais Lago as Elisa, a doctor in the Offshore and Rafael's girlfriend. (seasons 2–4)
- Amanda Magalhães as Natália (season 4; recurring seasons 2–3)
- Fernando Rubro as Xavier (season 4; recurring season 3)

=== Recurring ===
- Mel Fronckowiak as Júlia, Ezequiel's wife and an employee of the Process, who ends up being depressed and in doubt about her actions. (season 1; guest season 2)
- Sérgio Mamberti as Matheus, a member of the Council. (season 1)
- Zezé Motta as Nair, a member of the Council who serves as a friend to Ezequiel.
- Celso Frateschi as the Old Man, the founder of the Cause. (seasons 1–2; guest season 4)
- Luciana Paes as Cássia, head of security for the Process. She is extremely loyal to Ezequiel. (seasons 1–2; guest season 4)
- Dárcio de Oliveira as Antônio, a spiritual leader and Fernando's father. (seasons 1–2; guest seasons 3–4)
- Luana Tanaka as Ágata, a candidate in Michele's group. (season 1)
- Roberta Calza as Ivana (seasons 1–2; guest season 3)
- Rita Batata as Denise (seasons 1, 4)
- Leonardo Garcez as Daniel (season 1; guest season 2)
- Clarissa Kiste as Luciana (season 1)
- Júlio Silvério as Otávio (season 1)
- Thiago Amaral as Álvaro (season 1; guest season 2)
- César Gouvêa as César (season 1)
- Geraldo Rodrigues as Geraldo (season 1)
- Ediana Souza as Camila (season 1; guest season 2)
- Fernanda Vasconcellos as Laís (season 2; guest seasons 3–4)
- Maria Flor as Samira (season 2; guest season 4)
- Silvio Guindane as Vítor (season 2; guest seasons 3–4)
- Marina Matheus as Ariel (season 2; guest seasons 3–4)
- Léo Belmonte as Arthur Moreira (seasons 3–4)
- Guilherme Zanella as Tadeu (season 3)
- Kaique de Jesus as Ricardo (season 3)
- Rafael Losso as Otávio Bernardes (season 3)
- Ney Matogrosso as Leonardo Álvares (season 3; guest season 4)

== Episodes ==
Season	Episodes	Originally released
1	8	November 25, 2016
2	10	April 27, 2018
3	8	June 7, 2019
4	7	August 14, 2020

== Production ==
=== Conception and development ===
Creator and writer Pedro Aguilera developed 3% from a 2009 independent pilot episode. Netflix gave the series an 8-episode order for the first season. It is the first Portuguese-language Netflix original series and the second non-English production, after the Spanish-language series Club de Cuervos.

Academy Award-nominated cinematographer César Charlone, known for City of God and Blindness, served as director alongside Daina Giannecchini, Dani Libardi, and Jotagá Crema. Charlone also serves as an executive producer, alongside Tiago Mello. The first season became available on Netflix worldwide on November 25, 2016. In December 2016, Netflix renewed the series for a second season, which was released on April 27, 2018. On June 4, 2018, the series was renewed for a third season, which was released on June 7, 2019.

=== Filming ===
On March 11, 2016, Netflix announced the filming of the series in São Paulo. The principal photography for the first season began with the primary location at the interior of the Arena Corinthians, chosen for its luxurious and futuristic design and used as "The Process" building. A scenographic favela was built in a large abandoned factory in the neighborhood of Brás, central Region of São Paulo (representing the "Inland") and with some other scenes shot at the outskirts of the city, such as in the neighborhoods Heliópolis, Vila Madalena, Parque da Juventude and Ocupação Cine Marrocos.

Exterior scenes for the second season's "Offshore" were filmed at the Inhotim Institute in Brumadinho, Minas Gerais. Most of the scenes shot at Inhotim are concentrated in the central gardens, especially in the place where the statue of the "Founding Couple" stands, inserted using CGI. But three other pavilions also served as filming locations: Adriana Varejão pavilion (where the characters access the submarine), Cosmococas, by Hélio Oiticica (the military center) and Sonic Pavilion, by Doug Aitken (where the council meeting takes place).

The third season included as a new filming location the conservation unit Dunas do Rosado at Porto do Mangue, Rio Grande do Norte, used for the scenes of the "Shell".

== Reception ==
=== Critical response ===
On the review aggregator Rotten Tomatoes, the first season holds an approval rating of 85%, based on 20 reviews, with an average score of 6.5/10. The critical consensus reads: "Despite comparisons to other teen-centric dystopian thrillers, 3% separates itself from the pack by focusing on characters with complicated backstories and personalities." Liz Shannon Miller gave the first season a B+ in her review for IndieWire, saying that the series left her "surprised and impressed." Calum Henderson of the New Zealand Herald said in his review "The characters are the show's strongest point, though, and it skillfully introduces the six core candidates throughout the Process' preliminary challenges in the first episode."

=== Awards and nominations ===
Year	Award	Category	Nominee(s)	Result	Ref.
2017	Fénix Awards	Television: Best Drama Series	3%	Nominated	
2019	Rio2C (Rio Creative Conference)	Global Audience Award	3%	Won	
2020	ABC Cinematography Award	TV - Best Cinematography	3%	Nominated	

== Other media ==
=== The 3% Challenge ===
Doppio Games, in association with Netflix, developed a free-to-play voice-based game based on the series, released to Amazon Alexa and Google Assistant. The game featured a prequel storyline written in collaboration with Pedro Aguilera, showrunner and writer of the series. It was shut down on August 12, 2022.
