= Caramelo (film) =

2025 Brazilian drama film directed by Diego Freitas

Caramelo is a film directed by Diego Freitas and produced by Migdal Filmes for Netflix in Brazil. Its main characters are Pedro (Rafael Vitti) and a Brazilian street dog whose type gives the name of both the dog and the film.

It was released on 8 October 2025.

== Plot ==
Pedro (Rafael Vitti) has just become the chef cook of the noble restaurant where he used to work as an assistant cook when an unexpected diagnosis completely changes his plans. The adorable, caramel-colored mixed-breed dog he just met the day before embarks him on a journey of rediscovery, friendship and hope.

== Cast ==
- Rafael Vitti : Pedro
- Amendoim ('Peanut') : Caramelo
- Arianne Botelho : Camila
- Noemia Oliveira : Luciana
- Ademara : Paula
- Kelzy Ecard : Neide
- Bruno Vinícius : Leo
- Roger Gobeth : Ivan
- Olívia Araújo : Dr. Mariana
- Carolina Ferraz : Martha
- Paola Carosella : Restaurant reviewer
