= Bingo: The King of the Mornings =

2017 film directed by Daniel Rezende

- Film poster
- Directed by: Daniel Rezende
- Written by: Luiz Bolognesi
- Produced by: Ariel Elia; Fabio Gullane; Caio Gullane; Dan Klabin
- Starring: Vladimir Brichta; Leandra Leal; Ana Lúcia Torre
- Cinematography: Lula Carvalho
- Edited by: Márcio Hashimoto Soares
- Music by: Beto Villares
- Production companies: Empyrean; Gullane; Warner Bros. Pictures
- Distributed by: Warner Bros. Pictures
- Release date: 24 August 2017 (Brazil)
- Running time: 113 minutes
- Country: Brazil
- Language: Portuguese
- Budget: R$ 8.5 million
- Box office: US$ $899,440

Bingo: The King of the Mornings (Portuguese: Bingo: O Rei das Manhãs) is a 2017 Brazilian biographical drama film directed by Academy Award nominee Daniel Rezende in his directorial debut. Written by Luiz Bolognesi, the screenplay is inspired in the life of Arlindo Barreto, one of many actors who played Bozo the Clown in Brazil. However, to avoid copyrights claim and preserve its creative freedom, the production does not use either the name of Bozo or Arlindo, adopting the fictional names of Bingo and Augusto, respectively.

The film was released in Brazil on August 24, 2017. On September 15, it was selected as the Brazilian entry for the Best Foreign Language Film at the 90th Academy Awards, but it was not nominated.

== Plot ==
Inspired by a true story, Bingo: The King of the Mornings is a film about the man behind the mask. Augusto (Vladimir Brichta) is an artist looking for his place under the spotlight, following the footsteps of his mother (Ana Lúcia Torre), a stage artist in the 1950s. Restless in his search for applause, he finds a chance to conquer the crowds when he becomes "BINGO", a TV host clown from one of the audience leader's TV shows for children in the 1980s with the director Lucia (Leandra Leal) and the American producer Peter Olsen (Soren Hellerup). With makeup on, Augusto becomes an absolute success. But a clause on his contract forbids him to reveal his identity; an anonymous celebrity. Augusto turns into a clown who brings happiness to children across the country, but not to his own son, Gabriel (Cauã Martins), who sees his own father, idol and partner, distance himself while searching for fame. Filled with irony and humor, with the exaggerated pop look of the backstage universe of the 1980s Brazilian television, this film tells the incredible and surreal story of a man who finds his personal decay whilst looking for his artistic value.

== Cast ==
- Vladimir Brichta as Augusto Mendes/Bingo
- Leandra Leal as Lúcia
- Emanuelle Araújo as Gretchen
- Tainá Müller as Angélica
- Ana Lúcia Torre as Marta Mendes
- Augusto Madeira as Vasconcelos
- Cauã Martins as Gabriel Mendes
- Pedro Bial as Armando
- Domingos Montagner as Aparício
- Soren Hellerup as Peter Olsen

The movie has a cameo appearance of Fia Fer, Mauricio Cid and Victor Faviero.

== Reception ==
=== Critical response ===
Bingo: The King of the Mornings was highly acclaimed by the critics. The film has an approval rating of 85% on review aggregator website Rotten Tomatoes, based on 13 reviews, and an average rating of 6.2/10.

Reviewing it for Veja, Isabela Boscov said that the film is "the most exciting, exuberant, bold and original movie made by a Brazilian filmmaker since the release of City of God, 15 years ago", praising its capacity to combine comicality to desperation. She also lauded the performance of Vladimir Brichta, calling it "a genuine tour de force", and highlighted the direction of Daniel Rezende for its "coherent and dynamic style". Ikon London Magazine called Vladimir Brichta's performance second to none: "In portraying Augusto, Vladimir channels a compelling character – confident, vibrant and fearless. While at the same time, consumed and crushed from understanding that no one will ever know his real name or recognise his unmasked face.".

Stephen Dalton wrote in The Hollywood Reporter that "Bingo: The King of the Mornings has a pleasingly retro aesthetic of lurid 1980s fashions, scratchy VHS video effects and perky period pop hits. Brichta gives a compellingly wired performance, his fast-talking energy recalling the inspired intensity of vintage Robin Williams or Jim Carrey."

== See also ==
- List of submissions to the 90th Academy Awards for Best Foreign Language Film
- List of Brazilian submissions for the Academy Award for Best Foreign Language Film
