= Rita Batata =

Brazilian actress

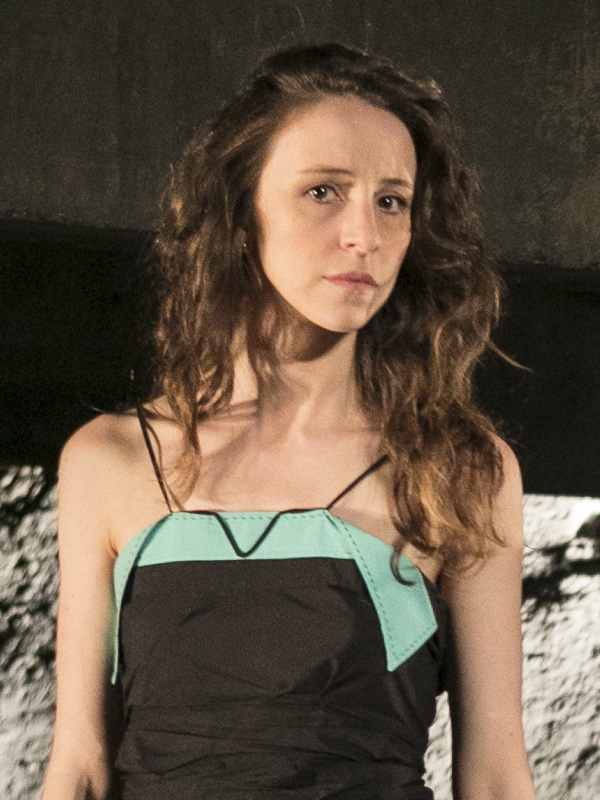
- Born: January 2, 1986 (age 40); São Paulo, Brazil
- Occupation: Actress
- Years active: 1999-present

Rita Batata (born January 2, 1986) is a Brazilian actress.

== Biography ==
Rita Batata has been active since the age of 16, working in theater, film and television. She graduated in Performing Arts from the INDAC Course of Actors. Her debut in the theater was in 2003 when starring in the play ' Belinha and the Beast '; since then, Batata has performed in several plays. She is the protagonist of De Menor, a film of Caru Alves de Souza that won the best fiction prize of the Rio Festival in 2013.

== Filmography ==
=== Television ===
Year	Work	Role
2004	Galera	Marcela
2009	3 porcento (web-série)	Michele
2009	Descolados	Melissa
2011	Oscar Freire 279	Liz
2012	Corações Feridos	Camila Reis
2012	Pílulas Poéticas	Vários Personagens
2013	Beleza S/A	Lúcia
2013	A Mulher do Prefeito	Rose
2016	A Garota da Moto	Cacá
2016	3%	Denise

=== Cinema ===
Year	Film	Role
2004	Quero Ser Jack White	Meg White
2005	Silvia	Sílvia
2005	Memórias Sentimentais de um Editor de Passos	
2006	A Cidade que Nasce na Luz	
2007	O Magnata	Silene
2007	Não por Acaso	Beatriz "Bia"
2009	Os Normais 2 - A Noite Mais Maluca de Todas	
2009	Os Inquilinos	Irmã da Menina Morta
2009	Ressaca	Bia
2010	Cara ou Coroa	
2011	O Mundo de Ulim e Oilut	Mãe
2012	Nove Crônicas Para Um Coração aos Berros	
2013	AM FM	
2013	Invasores	Sharise
2014	Minhas Piores Lembranças do Fim do Mundo São Aquelas Que Não Guardei Por Nem Um Segundo	Maria
2014	De Menor	Helena

== Awards and nominations ==
Year	Award	Category	Result
2010	4º Arraial Cine Fest, Bahia	melhor atriz coadjuvante pelo filme NÃO POR ACASO	Won
2012	3º CurtAmazônia - Festival de Cinema, Amazônia	melhor atriz pelo curta metragem RESSACA	Won
2014	19º Cinemato - Festival de Cinema e Vídeo de Cuiabá	melhor atriz pelo filme DE MENOR	Won
2014	16° Rencontres du Cinéma Sud-américain de Marseille, na França	melhor atriz pelo filme DE MENOR	Won
