= Rodolfo Valente =

Brazilian actor (born 1993)

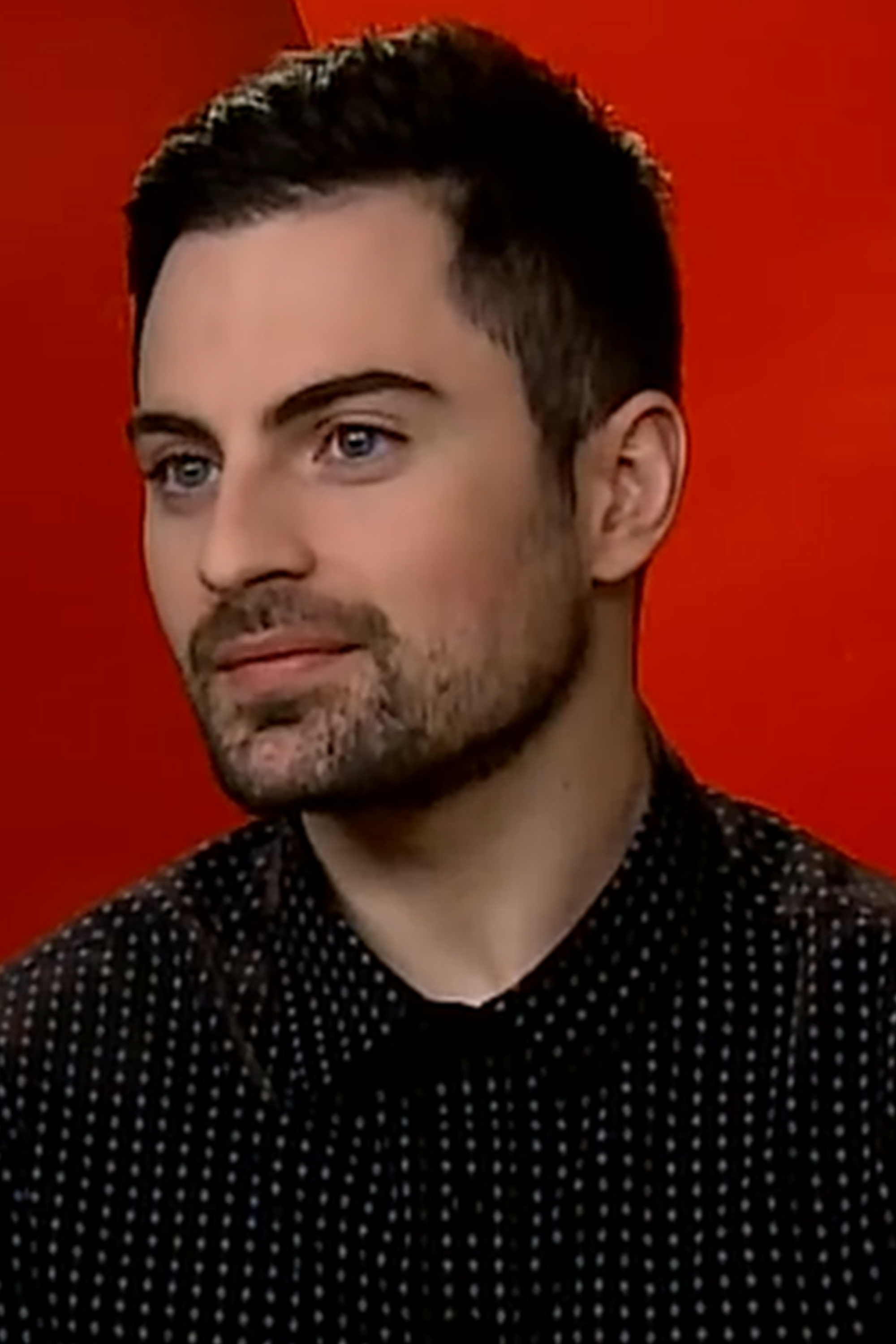
- Valente in 2016
- Born: Rodolfo Arrabale Valente; 8 March 1993 (age 33); São Paulo, Brazil
- Education: University of São Paulo
- Occupation: Actor
- Years active: 2000–present

Rodolfo Arrabale Valente (born 8 March 1993) is a Brazilian actor best known for playing Rafael in the Netflix series 3%.

== Career ==
Valente began working as an actor at the age of nine months. He has appeared in advertisements, movies, television, and on theatre stages. He underwent professional training at Studio Beto Silveira and took courses in physical theatre, such as in Commedia dell'arte, clowning, and mime. He has acted in several plays, such as Excepcionalmente Normal, ABC do Amor, Para Onde Vai a Escuridão Quando a Gente Acende a Luz, Fragmentos de Equus, Caverna do Dragão, Pequenos Palhaços, and Carro de Paulista. He has appeared on television in programs such as Sítio do Picapau Amarelo, Ilha Rá-Tim-Bum, Eterna Magia, Revelação, Seus Olhos, and Essas Mulheres. He has been involved with the Carpintaria do Ator centre since 2008. In 2011, he joined the School of Dramatic Arts at the University of São Paulo.

In 2012, Rodolfo joined the cast of Malhação (Young Hearts) on the Rede Globo network, playing the character of Rafael, who is bullied as he hangs out with the girls in the class, with whom he has more affinity, not liking football and being interested in fashion.

In 2016, he made an appearance in the soap opera Carinha de Anjo, playing Ricardo, a romantic and passionate young man. In the same year, he was cast in 3%, the first Portuguese-language Netflix original series as well as the first produced in Brazil, as Rafael.

== Filmography ==
=== Film ===
List of film appearances, with year, title, and role shown
Year	Title	Role	Notes
2000	A Floresta Feliz	Macaco	
2004	O Moleque	Pedrinho	Short
2011	Carro de Paulista	Sunshine	
2012	Chapô	Chapô	Short
2013	Amparo	Swimmer	Short
2018	13 Andares	Nero	

=== Television ===
List of television appearances, with year, title, and role shown
Year	Title	Role	Notes
2001	Ilha Rá-Tim-Bum	Tavinho	1 episode
2004	Seus Olhos	Gilson	3 episodes
2005	Essas Mulheres	Mateus Bicallo Moreira	23 episodes
2006	Sítio do Picapau Amarelo	Pedrinho	147 episodes
2007	Eterna Magia	Miguel Finnegan	27 episodes
2008–09	Revelação	Pedro Souza	27 episodes
2012–13	Malhação: Intensa como a Vida	Rafael Freire (Rafa)	228 episodes
2016	Carinha de Anjo	Ricardo Ávila	2 episodes
2016–20	3%	Rafael Moreira/Tiago	33 episodes
2019	Mauá, O Primeiro Gigante	Dom Pedro II	2 episodes
