= Rock Story =

Brazilian musical telenovela

- Genre: Telenovela; Musical drama
- Created by: Maria Helena Nascimento
- Directed by: Dennis Carvalho; Maria de Médicis
- Creative director: Dennis Carvalho
- Starring: Vladimir Brichta; Alinne Moraes; Nathalia Dill; João Vicente de Castro; Herson Capri; Ana Beatriz Nogueira; Rafael Vitti; Viviane Araújo; Paulo Betti; Alexandra Richter; Júlia Rabello; Suzy Rêgo; Laila Garin
- Opening theme: "Dê um Rolê" by Pitty
- Composers: Rogerio Vaz; Daniel Musy
- Country of origin: Brazil
- Original language: Portuguese
- No. of episodes: 179 (135 International version)

Production
- Production location: Rio de Janeiro
- Editors: Paulo Jorge; Wilson Fragoso; Ubiraci Motta; Pedro França; Chris Moura
- Camera setup: Multi-camera
- Running time: 37-46 minutes
- Production company: Estúdios Globo

Original release
- Network: TV Globo
- Release: 9 November 2016 – 5 June 2017

Rock Story is a Brazilian telenovela broadcast on TV Globo, created by Maria Helena Nascimento with the text supervisor as Ricardo Linhares, and directed by Dennis Carvalho. It originally aired from 9 November 2016, replacing Haja Coração at the traditional 7 p.m. timeslot to 5 June 2017.

It stars Vladimir Brichta, Nathalia Dill, Rafael Vitti, João de Castro, Viviane Araújo, Herson Capri, Ana Beatriz Nogueira, Paulo Betti, Laila Garin and Alinne Moraes.

Rock Story tells the trajectory of the rocker Guilherme Santiago, who was very successful in the 90s and now tries to return to the charts. In the plot, set in Rio, love and music run together, approaching hearts that have the same ideals.

== Plot ==
Gui Santiago (Vladimir Brichta) is a rock singer who has made a great success in the 1990s who tries to go back to fame again. In love with Diana (Alinne Moraes), he lives a tempestuous relationship with her and they have a daughter together, Chiara (Lara Cariello). Gordo (Herson Capri), Diana's father and owner of a record label was the one who made Gui to rise to stardom. The assaulting Leo Régis (Rafael Vitti), causes Gui almost lose everything because he accuses the teen idol of plagiarism on his dream song that he was to use for his comeback to the music scene.

The situation becomes complicated when Leo becomes romantically involved with Diana and Gui discovers being a father of Zac (Nicolas Prattes), the son he had with a fan. There is also Lázaro (João Vicente de Castro), Gui's childhood friend and manager of both Gui and Leo. Lázaro has been in love with Diana since he was young thus he is envious of Gui. In the middle of several conflicts, Gui meets ballet teacher Julia (Nathália Dill). Julia became a fugitive, after being used by her boyfriend Alex (Caio Paduan) to smuggle drugs to the United States. Julia trusts confides to the Gui. This later leads him into confusion about what he feels for his wife and the newly met lass. The new relationship and the emergence of the boyband formed by Zac, Nicolau (Danilo Mesquita), Tom (João Vítor Silva) and JF (Maicon Rodrigues), aiming to topple his rival, begins a transformation in the life of Gui.

== Cast ==
Actor	Character
Vladimir Brichta	Guilherme Santhiago (Gui)
Nathalia Dill	Júlia Monteiro
Nathalia Dill	Lorena Monteiro
Alinne Moraes	Diana
Rafael Vitti	Leonardo (Léo Régis)
João Vicente de Castro	Lázaro
Ana Beatriz Nogueira	Néia
Herson Capri	Salomão (Gordo)
Caio Paduan	Alexandre (Alex)
Júlia Rabello	Marisa
Nicolas Prattes	Zacarias (Zac)
Marina Moschen	Yasmin
Paulo Betti	Haroldo
Alexandra Richter	Eva
Suzy Rêgo	Gilda
Viviane Araújo	Edith
Thelmo Fernandes	Nelson
Danilo Mesquita	Nicolau
João Vítor Silva	Antônio (Tom)
Maicon Rodrigues	João Paulo (JP)
Rocco Pitanga	Dr. Daniel
Lara Cariello	Chiara
Cristina Mullins	Zuleica
Laila Garin	Laila
Lorena Comparato	Vanessa
Marjorie Gerardi	Tainá
Giovana Cordeiro	Stefany
Gabriel Louchard	Ramón
Tainá Medina	Joana
Christopher Heinrich	Frederico (Fred)
Luan Vieira	Caio
Helga Nemeczyk	Glenda
Kizi Vaz	Fernanda (Nanda)
Joana Borges	Luana
Júlia Marini	Astrid
Leandro Daniel	William
Paulo Verlings	Romildo
Fabi Bang	Nina
Guilherme Logulo	Agemiro (Miro)
Alessandra Verney	
Ana Cecília Costa	Mariane
Eike Duarte	
Enzo Romani	Jailson
Lara Lazzaretti	Sylvia (Syl)
Mariana Vaz	Bianca
Max Lima	Paçoca
Ravel Andrade	Du
Rodrigo dos Santos	Dr. Roberto
Thayla Luz	Natália
Thiago Justino	Luizão

=== Special guests ===
Actor	Character
Alcione Mazzeo	Ana (Aninha)
Amanda Grimaldi	Duda
Antônia Morais	Manuela
Camila Mayrink	Tamires
Louise D'Tuani	Luiza
Lana Rhodes	Paula
Lu Grimaldi	Glória Braga
Carol Garcia	Tina
Sophia Abrahão	Herself
Paula Toller	Herself
Luan Santana	Himself

== Soundtrack ==
=== Volume 1 ===
Rock Story - Vol. 1

Soundtrack album by Various artists
- Released: 9 November 2016
- Label: Som Livre

No.	Title	Artist(s)	Length
1.	"Dê um Rolê"	Pitty	4:30
2.	"The Greatest"	Sia ft. Kendrick Lamar	3:28
3.	"Quem Sabe Sou Eu"	Iza	2:45
4.	"Pretinha Vou Te Confessar"	Nego do Borel	3:21
5.	"Bom"	Ludmilla	2:52
6.	"Outro Sim"	Fernanda Abreu	3:44
7.	"Relentless Game"	Far from Alaska & Scalene	4:04
8.	"Me Espera"	Sandy ft. Tiago Iorc	3:50
9.	"Dia a Dia, Lado a Lado"	Tulipa Ruiz & Marcelo Jeneci	4:13
10.	"Home"	Jesuton	3:45
11.	"Sonhos Pintados de Azul"	Laila Garin & A Roda	4:21
12.	"Paciência"	Ferrugem	3:44
13.	"Burn Down the Summer"	Vittoria and the Hyde Park	3:25
14.	"Tico-Tico"	Sandro Becker	2:56
15.	"Julieta"	Sandro Becker	3:01

=== Volume 2 ===
Rock Story - Vol. 2

Soundtrack album by Various artists
- Released: 24 March 2017
- Label: Som Livre

No.	Title	Artist(s)	Length
1.	"We Will Rock You"	Queen
2.	"Don't Let Me Down"	The Chainsmokers ft. Daya
3.	"O Vento"	Projota
4.	"H.O.L.Y"	Flo Rida ft. Georgia Line
5.	"Mercy"	Shawn Mendes
6.	"Noturna"	Silva
7.	"Million Reasons"	Lady Gaga
8.	"Back Off"	Eric Silver
9.	"Stand Your Ground"	Republica
10.	"Weight In Gold"	Gallant
11.	"Verão Pra Te Aquecer"	Grupo Dose Certa
12.	"Conversinha Paralela"	Sorriso Maroto

== Ratings ==
Timeslot (AT)	# Eps.	Premiere		Finale		Rank	Season	Average viewership
Timeslot (AT)	# Eps.	Date	Viewers (in points)	Date	Viewers (in points)	Rank	Season	Average viewership
Monday—Saturday; 7:25 pm	179	9 November 2016	26	5 June 2017	35	TBA	2016–17	26

Since it launched in Brazil, the show averaged over 37 million viewers, and a 44% of the audience share. On social media, the series saw more than 31,000 online comments during its premiere.

Preceded by Haja Coração; 31 May 2016–8 November 2016	Globo 7 p.m. timeslot telenovela 9 November 2016–5 June 2017	Succeeded by Pega Pega; 6 June 2017–8 January 2018
