= Rafael Vitti =

Brazilian actor, musician and poet (born 1995)

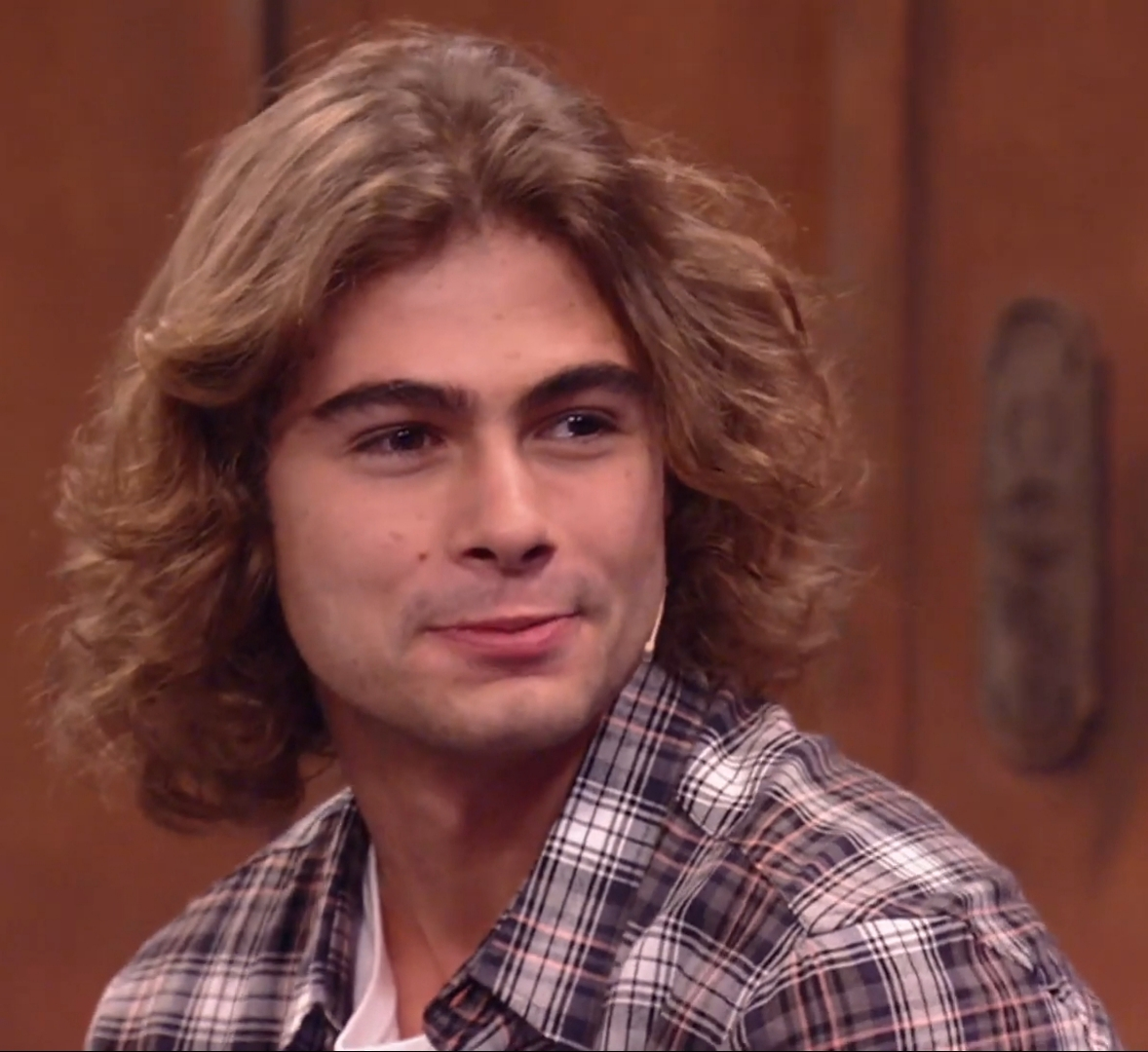
- Vitti in 2019
- Born: Rafael Alencar Vitti; November 2, 1995 (age 30); Rio de Janeiro, Brazil
- Occupation: Actor
- Years active: 2005–present
- Height: 1.82 m (5 ft 11 1/2 in)
- Spouse: Tatá Werneck (m. 2019)
- Children: 1
- Father: João Vitti

Rafael Alencar Vitti (Brazilian Portuguese: [ʁafaˈɛw ˈvitʃi], Italian: [ˈvitti]; born November 2, 1995) is a Brazilian actor, musician and poet. He became known for his character Pedro Ramos, one of the protagonists of the 22nd season of Malhação, titled Malhação Sonhos. He is the son of actors João Vitti and Valéria Alencar, and brother of actor Francisco Vitti.

== Biography and career ==
Born in Rio de Janeiro, Rafael Vitti grew up in the neighborhood of Flamengo, south of the city of Rio de Janeiro. His first artwork was in his theater with the play Quem Matou O Leão?. He made two short, the NÓS and Le Royale With Cheese before attempting to test to get in Malhação, already attending the course for the Performing Arts in UniRio. After trying to get into Malhação in season 2013 without success, Rafael tried again for the 22nd season, called Malhação Sonhos, in which passed and gave life to the remarkable character Pedro Ramos. For the character Pedro, Rafael had to get into guitar lessons, already with knowledge of guitar, the actor had to improve their knowledge to give life to the role of Pedro 'crazy loose guitarist' who was passionate about music, dreamed of becoming a famous guitarist and dating the fighter Karina, played by actress Isabella Santoni, forming Perina couple that was very successful among young people.

Without many difficulties Rafael proved to be a great learner and soon shone Pedro, influencing much on the great success of Malhação season. Soon after Malhação, Marcelo Faria invited to be part of the play Zero de Conduta that featured a strong cast, namely: Guilherme Hamacek, Cadu Libonati, Antônio Carlos, Mauricio Pitanga, Chico Melo and Nicole Gomes, his former partners working in Malhação.

In 2015 he gave life to the character Pedro Miller in the series Não se apega, não the Fantástico and signed in 2015 a 3-year contract with Rede Globo. As an actor, Rafael Vitti also shows other talents and facets. In addition to being successful in work as an actor, Rafael also shown writer. The actor has always had desire to launch book with his poems and phrases which often disclosed in their social networks. Thus was started the book titled Quer Se Ver No Meu Olho? with several of his poems still made in preadolescence will today forming in a book with several pages expressing his thoughts and reflections. And on March 18, 2016, announced the beginning of his second book, not yet titled.

Early in 2016, he participated in the video for the song Direção EP Vício singer Manu Gavassi.

Also in early 2016, Rafael Vitti was tipped to antagonist in the first phase of the new novel from 9 Rede Globo Velho Chico, which premiered March 14, 2016.

== Personal life ==
During the recording of the youth series Malhação Sonhos, he started dating actress Isabella Santoni, his romantic partner in the plot. The relationship came to an end in May 2015, shortly after the series ended.

In February 2017, he started dating actress Tatá Werneck, announcing the relationship only in August. In January 2018, they got engaged and in October they moved in together. On October 23, 2019, Clara, the couple's first daughter, was born.

== Filmography ==
=== Television ===
Year	Title	Role	Notes
2014–15	Malhação	Pedro Ramos	
2015	Não Se Apega, Não	Pedro Miller	
2016	Velho Chico	Carlos Eduardo Vidigal (Stage 1)	
2016	Truque Vip	Himself (Participant/Winner)	
2016	Rock Story	Leonardo (Léo Régis)	
2019	Verão 90	João Guerreiro	
2021	As Five	Ariel	
2022	Além da Ilusão	Davi Jardim / Rafael Antunes	
2025	Dona de Mim	Davi Boaz	
2025	Pablo & Luisão	Military Police Arthur Oliveira	Episode: "Meu Filho Usa Drogas"

=== Film ===
Year	Title	Role	Notes
2005	Amor de Mula	Jonas	
2012	Nós	Arthur	
2017	Os Saltimbancos Trapalhões 2 – Rumo à Hollywood	Pedro	
2019	Júpiter (film)	Jupiter Santana	
2025	Caramelo	Pedro	Netflix

=== Internet ===
Year	Title	Role
2016	Totalmente Sem Noção Demais	Maurício Ricardo

=== Music videos ===
Year	Song	Singer/Band
2016	Direção	Manu Gavassi
2016	Sonha Comigo	Léo Regis

== Theater ==
Year	Title	Role
2012	Quem Matou o Leão?	
2015	Zero de Conduta	Ariell Fischer
2016	Sempre Amigos	Leonardo
2018	Senhora dos Afogados	Sailor

== Literature ==
Year	Title	Publishing company
2015	Quer Se Ver No Meu Olho?	Seoman
2016	Amor Roxo	Seoman

== Discography ==
=== Soundtrack ===
Title	Year	Album	Videoclip
"Sonha Comigo"	2016	Rock Story	Yes
