= Viviane Porto =

Brazilian actress

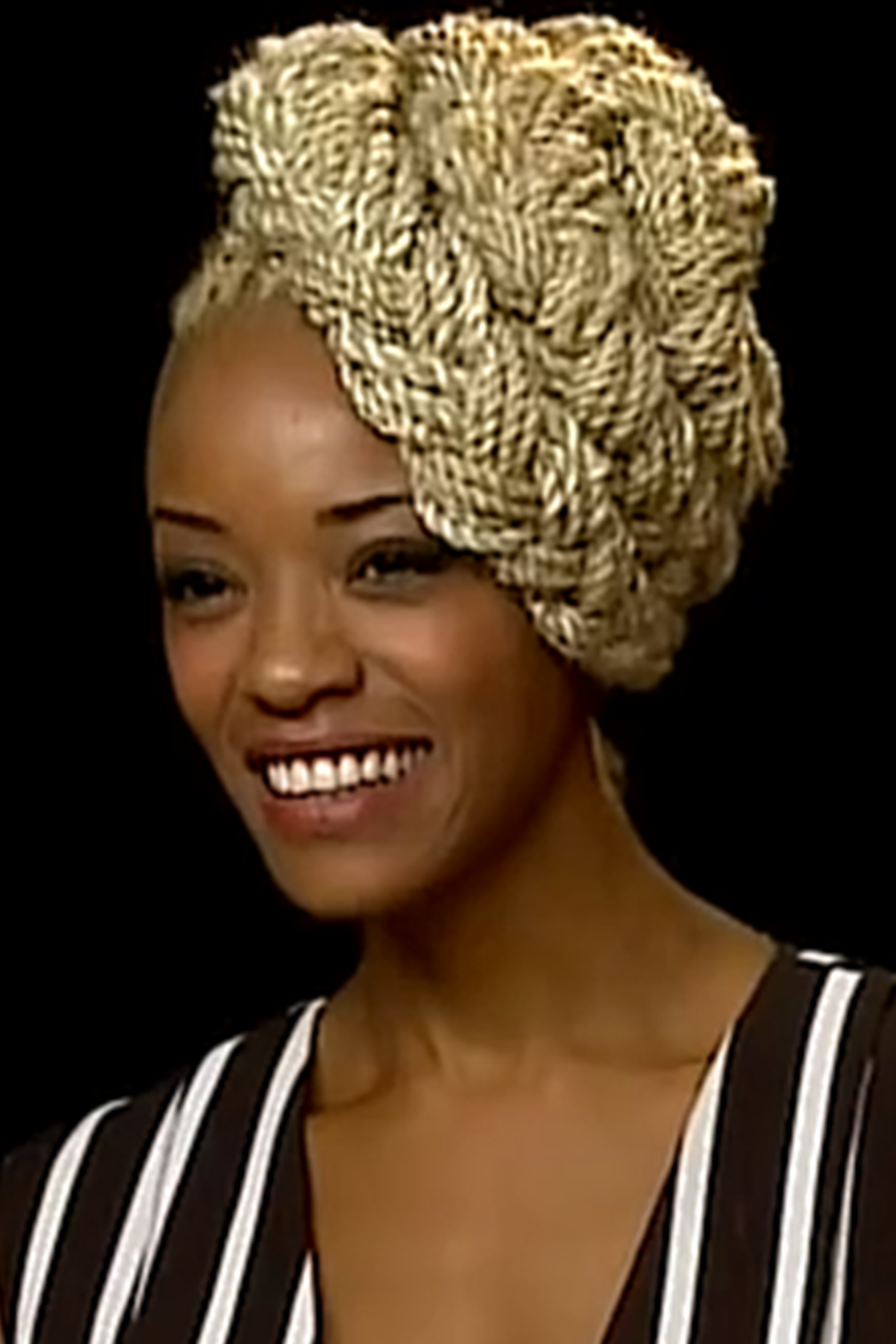
- Porto in November 2016
- Born: Viviane Porto Silva; 2 January 1981 (age 45); São Paulo, Brazil
- Occupation: Actress
- Years active: 1997–2004, 2015–present

Viviane Porto Silva (born 2 January 1981) is a Brazilian actress and former dancer.

== Biography ==
Porto began acting as an adolescent. She has participated in numerous theatrical productions, ranging from amateur to professional. She was a member of the Pia Fraus Company, combining dance with interpretation.

She is a noted activist for the rights of women and black people. Porto spent several years studying in Europe, where she co-founded the first local documentary festival NodoDocFest.

Her first appearance on TV was as one of the dancers of the game show Fantasia, from 1997 to 1999. In 2015, she acted as the hairdresser Cilene in Babilônia, a telenovela. In 2016, she participated in the series 3%, Netflix's first original Brazilian production, as Aline.

== Filmography ==
=== Television ===
Novels, Series and Minisseries
Year	Title	Role	TV channel
2016	3%	Aline	Netflix
2015	Babilônia	Cilene Farias	Rede Globo
2003	Chocolate com Pimenta	Inácia	Rede Globo
2003	A Casa das Sete Mulheres	Zefina	Rede Globo
2002	Marisol		SBT
2001	Amor e Ódio	Brenda	SBT
1999	Louca Paixão	Amanda Rangel	Rede Record
1997	Fantasia	Herself	SBT

=== Cinema ===
Year	Title	Role	Ref
2003	Garotas do ABC	Indalécia	
