= Velhos Bandidos =

- Directed by: Cláudio Torres
- Written by: Cláudio Torres; Fábio Mendes; Renan Flumian
- Produced by: Cláudio Torres; Renata Brandão; Juliana Capelini
- Starring: Fernanda Montenegro; Ary Fontoura; Bruna Marquezine; Vladimir Brichta; Lázaro Ramos
- Cinematography: André Horta
- Edited by: Isadora Boschiroli
- Music by: Carlos Trilha
- Production company: Conspiração FilmesStar Original Productions
- Distributed by: Paris Filmes
- Release date: 26 March 2026
- Running time: 93 minutes
- Country: Brazil
- Language: Portuguese

Velhos Bandidos (English: Old Bandits) is a 2026 Brazilian action comedy and crime film directed by Cláudio Torres and written by Torres, Fábio Mendes, and Renan Flumian. The film stars Fernanda Montenegro, Ary Fontoura, Bruna Marquezine, Vladimir Brichta, and Lázaro Ramos.

The film was released in Brazil on 26 March 2026.

== Plot ==
Marta and Rodolfo, an elderly retired couple dissatisfied with their routine lives, devise a plan to commit a daring bank robbery. Realizing they require assistance to execute the heist, they recruit Nancy and Sid, a younger criminal duo. As the team prepares for the robbery, they must contend with investigator Oswaldo, who becomes increasingly determined to stop them.

== Cast ==
- Fernanda Montenegro as Marta
- Ary Fontoura as Rodolfo
- Bruna Marquezine as Nancy
- Vladimir Brichta as Sid
- Lázaro Ramos as Oswaldo Aranha
- Hugo Bonemer as Firefighter Torres
- Dhara Lopes as Alice
- Vera Fischer as Ingrid
- Reginaldo Faria as Carlos
- Tony Tornado as Herculano
- Nathália Timberg as Lucila
- Teca Pereira as Elizabeth
- Laila Garin as Anabela

== Release ==
Velhos Bandidos premiered in Brazilian cinemas on 26 March 2026. The film was distributed in Brazil by Paris Filmes.
