= Vladimir Brichta =

Brazilian actor (born 1976)

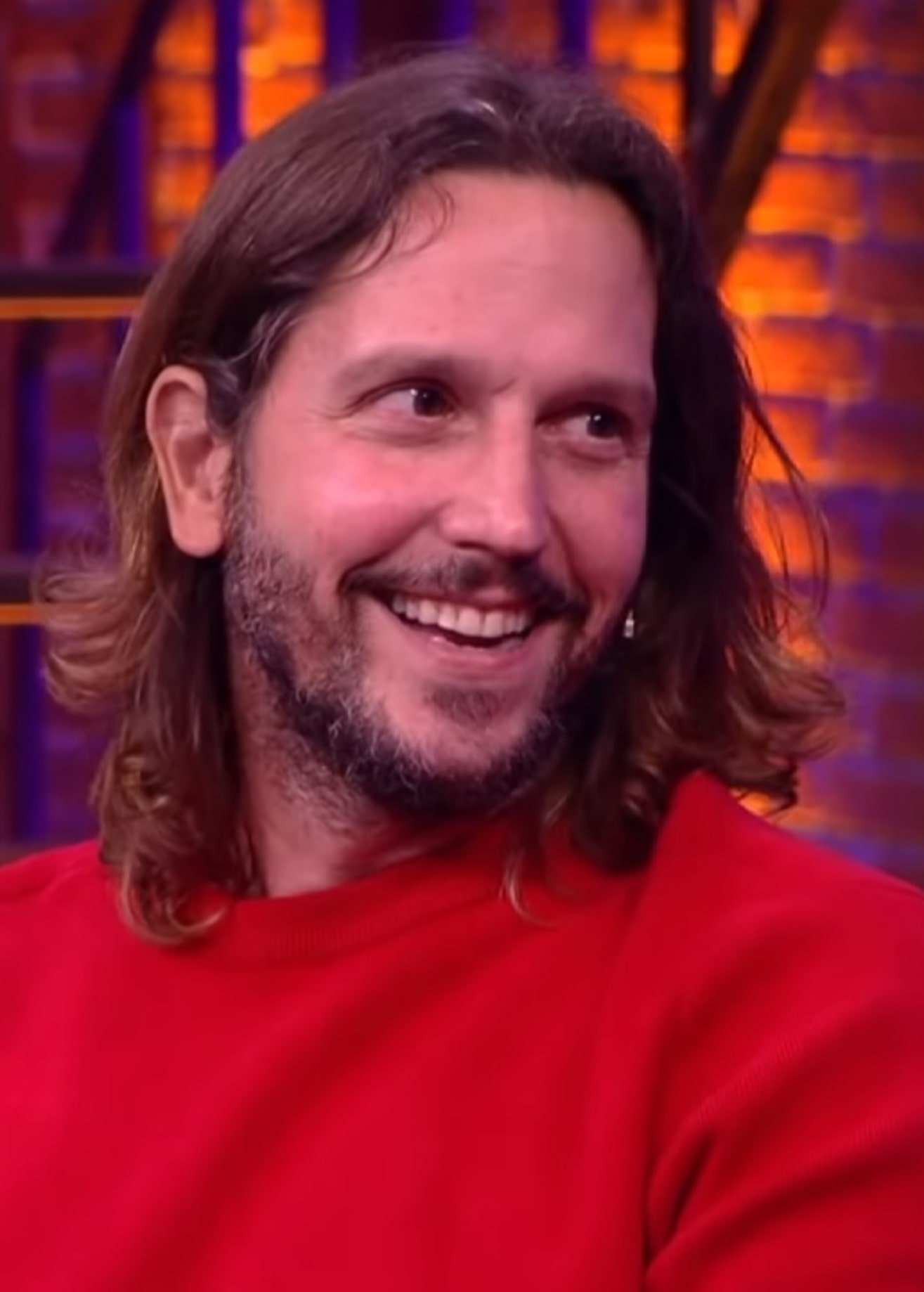
- Brichta in 2020.
- Born: Paulo Vladimir Brichta; 22 March 1976 (age 50); Diamantina, Minas Gerais, Brazil
- Education: Federal University of Bahia
- Occupation: Actor
- Years active: 2001–present
- Spouses: Gena Karla Ribeiro (m. 1995; died 1999) Ana Paula Bouzas (m. 2000; div. 2003) Adriana Esteves (m. 2006)
- Children: 2
- Parent(s): Arno Brichta (father); Carmem Barros (mother)

Paulo Vladimir Brichta (born 22 March 1976) is a Brazilian actor.

== Biography ==
Paulo Vladimir Brichta was born in Diamantina, Minas Gerais and grew up in Bahia where his family settled after returning from Germany when Brichta was four. Brichta was part of an amateur theater troupe associated with the Hilda Figueiredo school from an early age where he developed his penchant for performing arts.

== Personal life ==
He currently lives with his wife, actress Adriana Esteves, with their son, Vicente, his daughter Agnes and Felipe, the son of Adriana's first marriage, with Brazilian actor Marco Ricca.

== Filmography ==
=== Television ===
Year	Title	Role	Notes
2001	Porto dos Milagres	Ezequiel	
2002	Coração de Estudante	Nélio Garcia	
2003	Sexo Frágil	Valentina / Paulão	
2003	Kubanacan	Enrico Puentes	
2004	A Diarista	Himself	
2004	Começar de Novo	Pedro Borges Karamazov	
2005	A História de Rosa	Miguel Tónacio	Rede Globo's special
2005	Belíssima	Narciso Solomos Güney	
2007	Sob Nova Direção	Gustavo	
2008	Faça Sua História	Oswaldir	
2010	Separação?!	Agnaldo	
2011	Amor em 4 Atos	Aryclenes dos Santos	
2011–15	Tapas & Beijos	Armane	
2014–2017	Tá no Ar: a TV na TV	Himself/voice of Chewbacca	
2016	Mister Brau	Joaquim Ferreira (Formiga)	
2016	Justiça	Celso	
2016	Rock Story	Guilherme Santiago (Gui)	
2017	Cidade Proibida	Zózimo	
2018	Segundo Sol	Remildo "Remy" Falcão	
2019	Amor de Mãe	Davi Moretti	
2021	Quanto Mais Vida, Melhor!	Luca Marino "Neném"	
2024	Renascer	Coronel Egídio Coutinho	
2024	Pedaço de Mim	Tomás	

=== Film ===
Year	Title	Role
2003	Paisagem de Meninos	Homem Relâmpago
2005	A Máquina	José Onório
2006	Fica Comigo Esta Noite	Edu
2008	Romance	Orlando
2009	A Mulher Invisível	Carlos
2010	Quincas Berro D'Água	Leonardo
2012	A Coleção Invisível	Beto
2013	Muitos Homens Num Só	Dr. Antônio
2014	Minutos Atrás	Alonso
2014	Real Beleza	João
2015	Minions	Herb Overkil (voice dubbing)
2016	Um Homem Só	Arnaldo
2016	Vai que Dá Certo 2	Elói
2017	Bingo: The King of the Mornings	Augusto Mendes (Bingo)
2026	Velhos Bandidos	Sid
