= Caio Paduan =

Brazilian actor

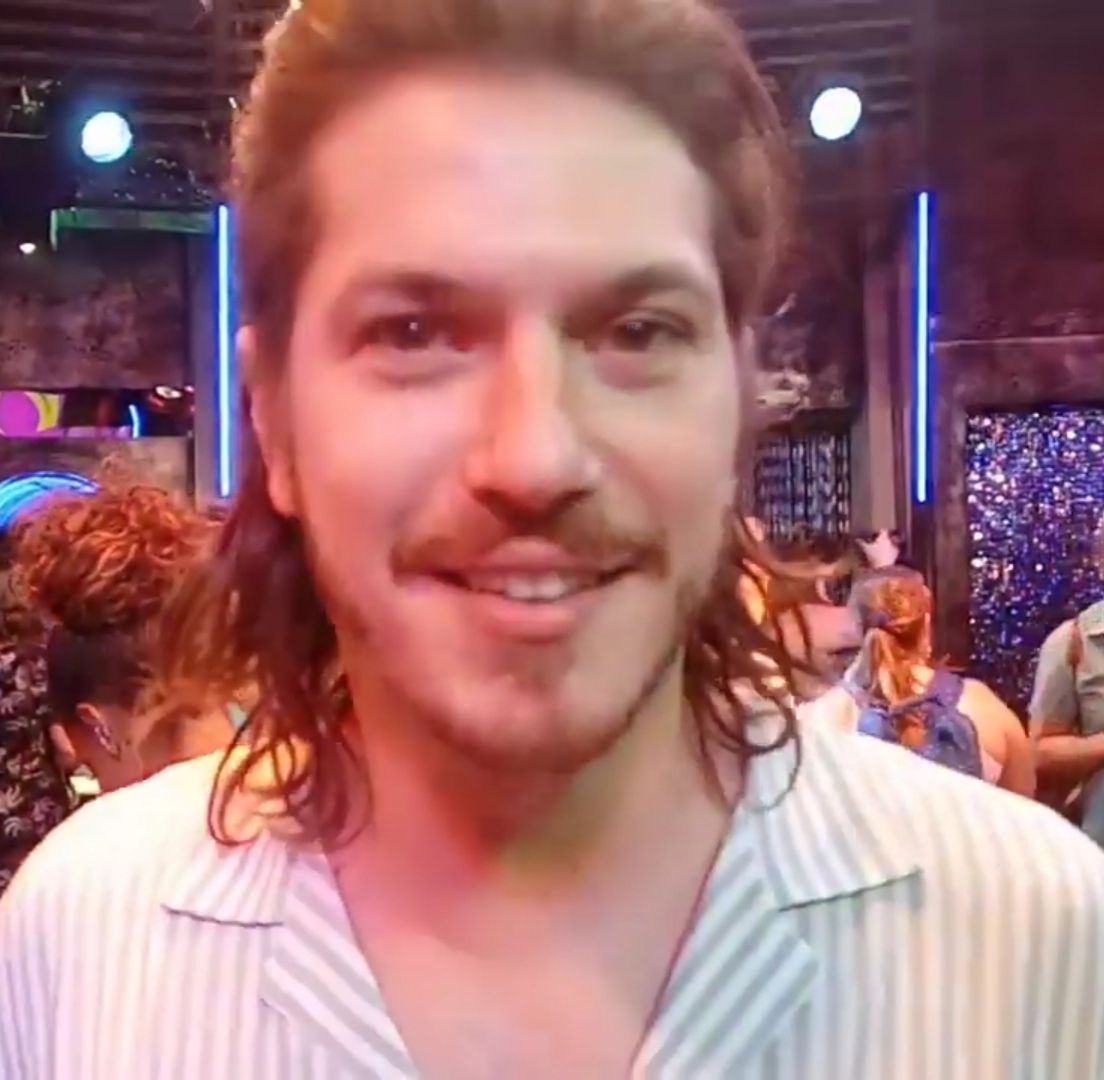
- Born: 5 December 1986 (age 39); Rio de Janeiro, Brazil
- Occupation: Actor
- Years active: 2011–present

Caio Paduan (born 5 December 1986) is a Brazilian actor.

== Career ==
In 2011, he was the protagonist of the nineteenth season of Malhação, where he made a romantic pair initially with Thaís Melchior and then with Bia Arantes.

In 2015 he joined the cast of the novel Além do Tempo, where he played the romantic Afonso. The following year, Caio joined the cast of the novel Rock Story, playing the villain Alex. In 2017 he entered the cast of O Outro Lado do Paraíso. Currently plays playboy Quinzinho in the 19 PM timeslot telenovela Verão 90.

== Filmography ==
=== Television ===
Year	Title	Role	Notes
2011–12	Malhação Conectados	Gabriel Nascimento	Season 19
2015	As Canalhas	Roberto	Episode: "Tatiana"
2015	Além do Tempo	Afonso Santarém	
2016–17	Rock Story	Alexandre Palhares (Alex) / Evandro Norris	
2017–18	O Outro Lado do Paraíso	Bruno Vasconcelos	
2019	Verão 90	Joaquim Ferreira Lima Filho (Quinzinho)	

=== Cinema ===
Year	Title	Role	Notes
2014	Catarse	Jorginho	Short film
2014	Sobre Papéis	Vítor	Short film
2019	Estação Rock	Osso	

== Awards and nominations ==
Year	Award	Category	Work	Result
2017	Prêmio Contigo! Online 2017	Best Supporting Actor	Rock Story	Nominated
