= Cynthia Senek =

Brazilian actress

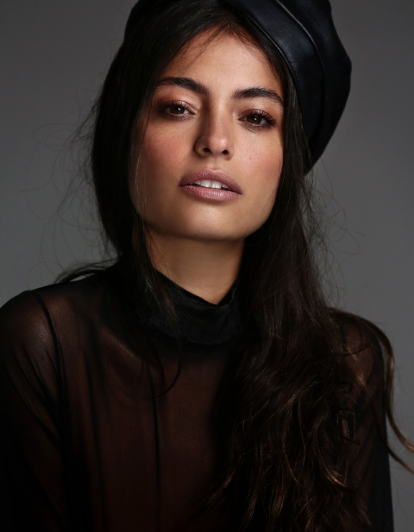
- Senek in 2021
- Born: 27 November 1993 (age 31); Curitiba, Paraná, Brazil
- Occupation: Actress
- Years active: 2002; 2009–present

Cynthia Senek (born 27 November 1993) is a Brazilian actress.

== Filmography ==
Year	Title	Role
2015	Sete Vidas	Lyris
2015	Malhação: Seu Lugar no Mundo	Maria Christina Manosso (Kris)
2016	Malhação: Pro Dia Nascer Feliz	Maria Christina Manosso (Kris)
2018	3%	Gloria Junqueira
2019	A Dona do Pedaço	Edilene Menlo
2022	Summer Heay	Marília Dias
2023	Vicky e a Musa	Aline Bullock
