= Laila Garin =

Brazilian actress

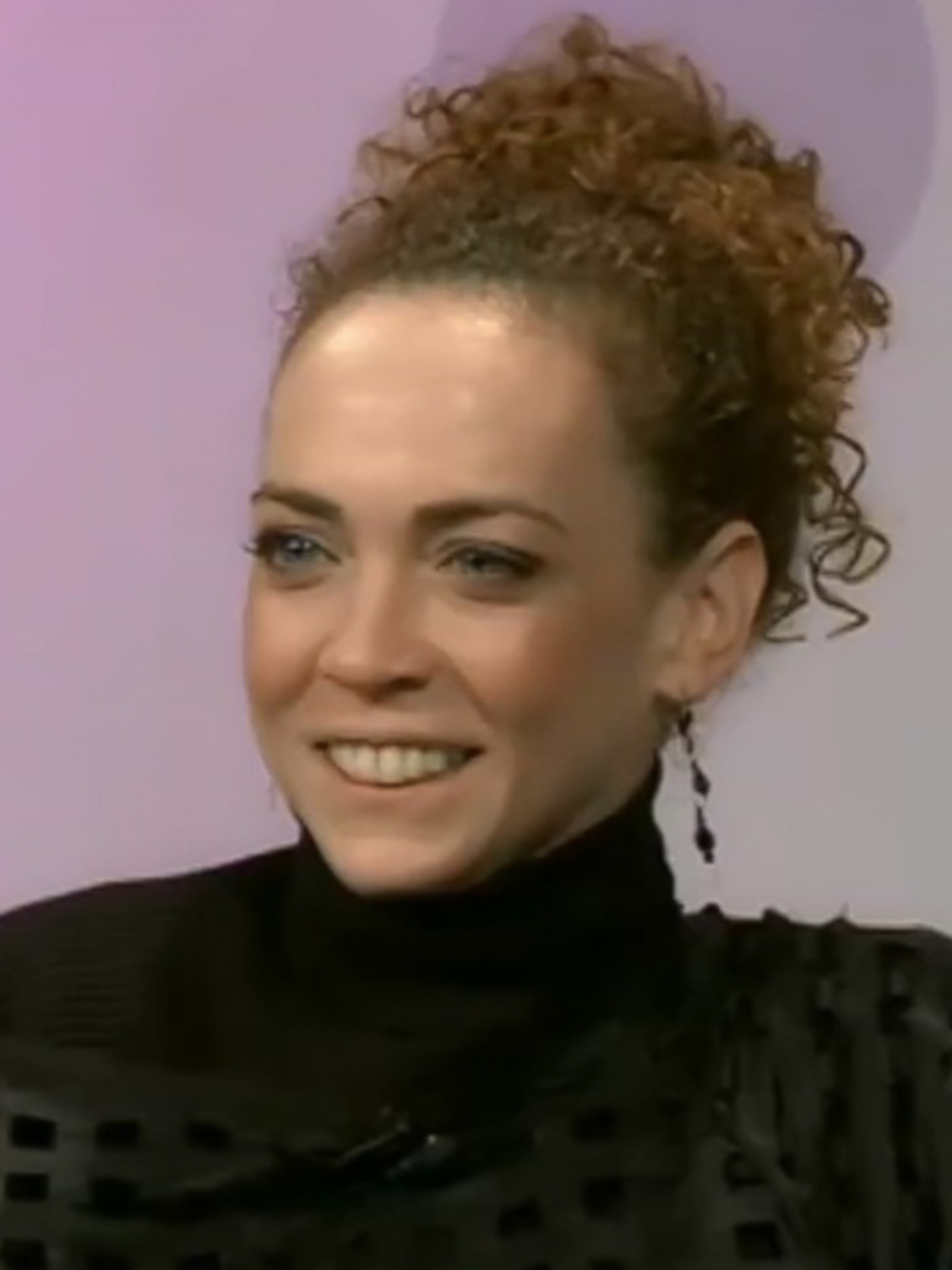
- Garin in 2016
- Born: Laila Miranda Garin; 17 February 1978 (age 48); Salvador, Bahia, Brazil
- Education: Federal University of Bahia
- Occupations: Actress; singer
- Years active: 1996–present
- Spouse: Hugo Mercier (m. 2013)

Laila Miranda Garin (born 17 February 1978) is a Brazilian actress and singer.

== Biography ==
Garin was born in Salvador, Bahia, the daughter of a French father and a Brazilian mother. She graduated in performing arts from the Federal University of Bahia.

== Career ==
In the 2013 biographic musical "Elis, A Musical", directed by Dennis Carvalho, Laila delivered a standout performance in the epinonimous role of the famous Brazilian singer Elis Regina.

Following a period with Théâtre du Soleil in Paris, Laila worked in "Grease" in São Paulo and went to Rio de Janeiro in 2009, where she starred in the show "Eu te amo mesmo assim", directed by João Sanches and supervised by João Falcão. It was on this occasion that she moved from São Paulo to Rio de Janeiro. She also performed in the show "Gonzagão - A Lenda".

Laila began studying theater at age 11 and singing lyrical at age 13. At the age of 15, she was part of an amateur theater group at Casa Via Magia, and performed in plays such as "Romeo & Juliet and Caetano", with fragments of Shakespeare's work and songs by composer, "A Casa de Eros" (1996), "Medeia" (1997), "Roberto Zucco" (1998) and "Lábaro Estrelado" (1999).

In 2015, the actress was climbed to the novel of the nine, "Babilônia", exhibited by Rede Globo. In the plot, she lived Maria José, the wife of a corrupt politician. Laila also did a part in the series "Louco por Elas", also of Rede Globo.

Laila gained an international audience when she appeared in the popular Netflix Sci-fi series "3%" (2016) as the character Marcela Álvarez.

In January 2022, she released a single with Chico César, "Vermelho Esperança", written by him and taken off the soundtrack for the theater play A hora da estrela – O canto de Macabéa, which happened in 2020 and was inspired by Clarice Lispector's Hour of the Star.

== Personal life ==
In 2013, she married the French theater illuminator Hugo Mercier.

== Filmography ==
=== Television ===
Year	Title	Role	Notes
2010	Clandestinos: o Sonho Começou	Laila	
2011	Força Tarefa	Gleisy	Episode: "17 November 2011"
2011	Som Brasil	Herself	Episode: "Carlos Lyra"
2012	Louco por Elas	Dora	Episode : "27 November 2012"
2013	A Grande Família	Leila	Episode: "Cenas de um Descasamento"
2015	Babilônia	Maria José Matos Pimenta	
2015	Santo Forte	Dalva da Cruz Forte	
2016–17	Rock Story	Laila / Ana Laura Blanco	
2017	Sob Pressão	Bete	Episódio: 3
2018	3%	Marcela	
2023	The End	Norma	

=== Film ===
Year	Title	Role	Notes
2005	Eu Me Lembro	Nandinha	
2010	Um Outro Ensaio	Ela	Short film
2019	Divaldo: O Mensageiro da Paz	Ana Franco	
2026	Velhos Bandidos		

=== Theater ===
Year	Title	Role
1996	A Casa de Eros	
1996	Don Juan	
1997	Medeia	
1998	Roberto Zucco	
1999	Lábaro Estrelado	
2001	O Tempo e os Conways	
2002	Grease, o Musical	Marty
2004	Porti-Nari	
2005	A Sombra de Quixote	
2007	O Homem Provisório	
2009	Os Figurantes	
2009	Moi et Mon Cheveu	
2010	Eu te amo Mesmo Assim - O Musical	
2012	Enlace - A Loja do Ourives - O Musical	Malina
2012	Gonzagão, a Lenda - O Musical	Branca
2013	Elis - A Musical	Elis Regina
2015	O Beijo no Asfalto - O Musical	Selminha
2016–17	Gota D'Água [a seco] - O Musical	Joana
2017- 18	2 Filhos de Francisco - O Musical	Helena

== Awards and nominations ==
Year	Award	Category	Work	Result
2001	Prêmio Copene de Teatro	Best Supporting Actress	O Tempo e os Conways	Nominated
2005	Festival de Brasília	Best Actress	Eu me Lembro	Won
2011	4°Festival Cinema de Triunfo	Best Actress	Um Outro Ensaio	Won
2012	1°Festival de Cinema de Blumenau	Best Actress	Um Outro Ensaio	Won
2013	Prêmio Quem de Teatro	Best Actress	Elis, A Musical	Won
2014	Troféu APCA	Best Actress	Elis, A Musical	Won
2014	Prêmio Shell	Best Actress	Elis, A Musical	Won
2014	Prêmio Reverência	Best Actress	Elis, A Musical	Won
2014	Prêmio Bibi Ferreira	Best Actress	Elis, A Musical	Won
2014	Prêmio Cesgranrio de Teatro	Best Actress	Elis, A Musical	Won
2014	Prêmio Botequim Cultural de Teatro	Best Actress	Elis, A Musical	Won
2014	Prêmio Aplauso Brasil de Teatro	Best Actress	Elis, A Musical	Nominated
2014	Prêmio APTR	Best Actress	Elis, A Musical	Nominated
2014	Prêmio Arte Qualidade Brasil de Teatro	Best Actress	Elis, A Musical	Nominated
2014	Prêmio Cenym de Teatro	Best Actress	Elis, A Musical	Nominated
2015	Festival Internacional de Televisão de São Paulo	Best Actress	Santo Forte	Nominated
2015	Prêmio Reverência	Best Actress	O Beijo no Asfalto - O Musical	Won
2015	Prêmio Cesgranrio de Teatro	Best Actress	O Beijo no Asfalto - O Musical	Nominated
2015	Prêmio Botequim Cultural de Teatro	Best Actress	O Beijo no Asfalto - O Musical	Won
2016	Prêmio Cesgranrio de Teatro	Best Actress	Gota D'Água [a seco] - O Musical	Won
2016	Prêmio Arte Qualidade Brasil de Teatro	Best Actress	Gota D'Água [a seco] - O Musical	Won
2016	Prêmio Musical Cast	Best Actress	Gota D'Água [a seco] - O Musical	Won
2016	Prêmio Botequim Cultural de Teatro	Best Actress	Gota D'Água [a seco] - O Musical	Won
2016	Prêmio Cenym de Teatro	Best Actress	Gota D'Água [a seco] - O Musical	Nominated
2016	Prêmio Aplauso Brasil de Teatro	Best Actress	Gota D'Água [a seco] - O Musical	Nominated
2016	Prêmio APTR	Best Actress	Gota D'Água [a seco] - O Musical	Nominated
2016	Troféu APCA	Best Actress	Gota D'Água [a seco] - O Musical	Nominated
2016	Prêmio Destaque Impressa Digital de Teatro	Best Actress	Gota D'Água [a seco] - O Musical	Won
2017	Prêmio Bibi Ferreira	Best Actress	Gota D'Água [a seco] - O Musical	Won
2017	Prêmio Reverência	Best Actress	Gota D'Água [a seco] - O Musical	Won
2017	Prêmio Destaque Impressa Digital de Teatro	Best Supporting Actress	2 Filhos de Francisco - O Musical	Nominated
