= S.O.S. Mulheres ao Mar 2 =

2015 film directed by Cris D'Amato

- Film poster
- Directed by: Cris D'Amato
- Written by: Sylvio Gonçalves; Bruno Garotti
- Starring: Giovanna Antonelli; Reynaldo Gianecchini; Thalita Carauta; Fabíula Nascimento; Felipe Roque
- Distributed by: Universal Pictures; Europa Filmes; Elo Company
- Release date: October 22, 2015 (Brazil)
- Running time: 90 minutes
- Country: Brazil
- Language: Portuguese
- Box office: $5,169,793

S.O.S. Mulheres ao Mar 2 is a 2015 Brazilian comedy film, directed by Cris D'Amato and written by Sylvio Gonçalves and Bruno Garotti. It is a sequel of the 2014 film S.O.S. Mulheres ao Mar, starring Giovanna Antonelli, Thalita Carauta, Fabíula Nascimento, Reynaldo Gianecchini, Rhaisa Batista, Felipe Roque and Felipe Montanari.

The film was released in Brazilian cinemas on October 22, 2015.

== Plot ==
A year after they met, the writer Adriana (Giovanna Antonelli), now a successful writer, happily follows in her romance with André (Reynaldo Gianecchini), who is about to launch his newest fashion collection during a cruise Caribbean and will travel from the US to Mexico accompanied by Anitta (Rhaisa Batista), a top model desired by men. However, when she discovers that the beautiful ex-girlfriend of the stylist will accompany him in search of a reconciliation, Adriana summons her sister Luiza (Fabíula Nascimento) and Dialinda (Thalita Carauta) to take the first flight to Miami. The next day, Dialinda, who now works in the US, greets the sisters and takes them both to the city's port. An unexpected problem causes them to miss the ship's departure. Dialinda proposes that they drive to Mexico without knowing that she was sworn to death by the family of traffickers she worked for. In addition to the bad guys, Adriana and her friends are also followed by Roger (Felipe Montanari), a charming American FBI agent. It is the beginning of a new journey full of misunderstandings, by air, earth and finally sea, in which Adriana will prove, once again, that there are no borders for a woman in love.

== Cast ==
- Giovanna Antonelli as Adriana
- Thalita Carauta as Dialinda
- Fabíula Nascimento as Luiza
- Reynaldo Gianecchini as André
- Rhaisa Batista as Anitta
- Gil Coelho as Rafael
- Felipe Roque as Mauricio
- Felipe Montanari as Roger
- Selma Lopes as D. Granny
- Aline Guimarães as D. Vanda
- Jean-Paul Rappeneau as Frank
- Luana Martau as Host of the fashion show

== Reception ==
The film was watched by over 1,7 million people in Brazil. Despite its huge box-office success the film was received with overwhelmingly negative reviews by critics in Brazil. Daniel Dieb from Veja magazine asked his readers if any of them saw any humor in the film and added: "Maybe with three bottles of wine the movie would be a little fun, but because movie theaters do not sell alcohol, it will be more profitable to consume them away from the rooms that exhibit SOS Women to the Sea 2." Alexandre Agabiti Fernandez from Folha de S.Paulo rated the movie as "bad" and said: "The tone is of a soap opera, but the jokes are not funny. Giovanna Antonelli lacks the resources to make humor, Fabíula Nascimento tries to be funny always beating on the same key, and Thalita Carauta does not seem to have left the Zorra Total." Robledo Milani from the website "Papo de Cinema" gave the film only one of five stars and said: "SOS Women at Sea 2 is a movie with a single purpose: to bomb in the box office. Exhibition of travel agency brands, fast food chains, television channels, and amusement parks that the only remaining question is about the relevance of these interferences in the story that is - or should be - being told."

"SOS. Women at Sea 2" was nominated for the 2016 Brazilian Cinema Grand Prix in the category of "Best Comedy Feature", but lost to "Infância", by Domingos Oliveira.
