= Osvaldo Daniel =

- El Clon character
- First appearance: Grown up: "Fibras Sentimentales" (Episode 71)
- Created by: Glória Perez
- Portrayed by: Mauricio Ochmann (20 years old); Murilo Benício (Brazilian version)

In-universe information
- Relatives: Dora Padilla (Surrogate mother); Leonardo Ferrer (biological father); Teresa (biological mother); Diego Ferrer (biological twin brother); Lucas (Clone)

Osvaldo Daniel Padilla is a fictional cloned man and the series title character on the Telemundo television series El Clon. The character is portrayed by actor Mauricio Ochmann, and was created by Glória Perez.

== Background ==
After the death of Diego, Dr. Augusto Albieri attempted to subvert mortality by cloning. He took the cell nucleus from Lucas and transferred it into an unfertilised oocyte without nucleus. The hybrid cell is then stimulated to divide by an electric shock, and when it develops into a blastocyst it is implanted in Dora, the surrogate mother.

== Family ==
See here for Daniel's biological family members

Dora "Encarnacion" Padilla has always wanted a child. She has multiple sexual relationship with Osvaldo, hoping that she will get pregnant. She later discovered that Osvaldo is sterile and unable to give her child. She looked for the help of Dr. Silvia Valencia, a gynecologist who was working at Albieri's fertility clinic to get a child through artificial insemination. Albieri then implanted the blastocyst into Dora's ovary. At this time, Dora does not know that she was carrying a clone. When Dora was pregnant Albieri gave her very special attentions, until Daniel was born. Later he started to treat Daniel like his own child, keeping Dora away from her son.

Doña Estella Cardona, Dora's mother is not happy with Albieri's attitude and affections towards Daniel. She tells Dora to bring Daniel away from Albieri before Daniel eventually forgot who his parent was.

Osvaldo, the lover of Dora, does not accept his given name of Daniel. He was too stubborn to understand the way artificial insemination works and thought Dora was cheating on him. He later admits to Daniel that he is Daniel's father.

Dr. Albieri is the one who created Daniel. Due to the affections he showed to Daniel, Daniel mistakes him as his real father, and started to disobey Dora.

== Relationships ==
When Daniel grows up, he often has flashes of Arabic culture, with a woman dancing, covering her face. This makes him become interested in Moroccan culture. When he went to Morocco with Albieri, he was brought to Uncle Ali's house. There he saw Jade dancing, like in the flashes he had.

Karla Perez has a sexual relationship with Daniel, since he is attractive. Karla then pregnant, believing that it was Roberto Del Valle's.

== Receptions ==
When people who knew Lucas and Diego saw the grown up Daniel, they were surprised and reacted in many ways.

When Enrique involves into his addiction to alcohol again, he saw Daniel on the street and misinterprets him as Diego that reincarnated when he was drunk. Leonardo did not believe him.

Albieri was shocked to see his creation has grown up, resembling to Lucas and Diego, both physically and mentally. When they first re-encounter 20 years later, he asked Daniel about his personality, comparing to Diego's and Lucas'. Albieri then tries his best to keep him away from others and brings him to Morocco, to meet Ali.

Ali was shocked when he saw the clone. He tells Albieri that it is haraam to create a human being. Ali reminded Albieri that Daniel is not like other human in the world, as he does not belong to anyone. Ali believes that Daniel is the sign given by Allah on the coming final judgement.

Jade was dancing when Daniel saw her.

Zoraida made multiple coffee reading predictions on Jade's future. In the prediction, it is revealed that Jade's love will be separated from his shadow. When Zoraida saw Daniel, she shouted and believes that Daniel is a bad genie.

Cristina first saw the grown up Daniel at the opening ceremony of Salamandra. Daniel gave her a kiss and Cristina eventually remembers the night she had with Diego. After Daniel told her that he is Dora's son, she immediately assumed that Leonardo was betraying her with Dora. She did not believe Dora and Leonardo's explanation and tries all the best to find the origins of Daniel.

Leonardo, the father of Diego and Lucas, together with Rosa, their nanny, was shocked when they first saw Daniel. Cristina brought the clone to the Ferrer's and both Leonardo and Rosa thought Daniel is Diego, reincarnates.
