= List of A Regra do Jogo episodes =

A Regra do Jogo (Rules of the Game) is a Brazilian primetime telenovela, created by João Emanuel Carneiro for Rede Globo, it premiered on August 31, 2015 at 9 pm timeslot. The cast includes Alexandre Nero, Giovanna Antonelli, Vanessa Giacomo, Cauã Reymond, Eduardo Moscovis, Marco Pigossi, Susana Vieira, Tony Ramos and Cássia Kis in the lead roles.

== Episodes ==
=== 2015 ===
No.	Title	Original release date	Ibope Rating (GSP)	Ibope Rating (GDJ)
1	"A Outra Face"	August 31, 2015	31.5	35
2	"Bandido Pobre"	September 1, 2015	29.5	30
3	"Samambaia"	September 2, 2015	25.3	25
4	"Quem é Você?"	September 3, 2015	28.0	29
5	"O Injustiçado"	September 4, 2015	24.8	25
6	"Amor de Mãe"	September 5, 2015	24.0	24
7	"O Peso de uma Dúvida"	September 7, 2015	27.6	29
8	"Infiltrado"	September 8, 2015	21.3	24
9	"Queima de Arquivo"	September 9, 2015	24.3	27
10	"Muito Prazer"	September 10, 2015	26.5	29
11	"Lobo no Galinheiro"	September 11, 2015	25.1	23
12	"Saudade é Pros Fracos"	September 12, 2015	23.8	27
13	"A Isca"	September 14, 2015	27.3	25
14	"Cem Anos de Perdão"	September 15, 2015	27.2	28
15	"Eu Gosto do Perigo"	September 16, 2015	21.0	20.5
16	"Francineide"	September 17, 2015	23.5	18.2
17	"Telhado de Vidro"	September 18, 2015	22.6	16.4
18	"O Travesseiro"	September 19, 2015	19.3	18.8
19	"Pé de Coelho"	September 21, 2015	27.6	28
20	"Pobres Otários"	September 22, 2015	24.7	25
21	"Vai me Matar ou Posso"	September 23, 2015	19.7	20
22	"Vaca Maldita"	September 24, 2015	25.2	25
23	"Convidada da Mamãe"	September 25, 2015	24.5	24
24	"Volte Uma Casa"	September 26, 2015	22.0	22
25	"A Invasora"	September 28, 2015	27.8	28
26	"Namoradinha"	September 29, 2015	26.7	27
27	"Duro Golpe"	September 30, 2015	22.2	27
