= Felipe Roque =

Felipe Roque may refer to:

- Felipe Roque (actor)
- Felipe Roque (volleyball)
