= Lucas Ferrer =

Fictional character

- O Clone/El Clon character
- First appearance: "Encuentro Divino"
- Created by: Glória Perez
- Portrayed by: Murilo Benício (O Clone); Mauricio Ochmann (El Clon)

In-universe information
- Spouses: Marisa Antonelli; Jade Rachid
- Children: Natalia Ferrer (with Marisa)
- Relatives: Leonardo Ferrer (father); Teresa (mother); Diego Ferrer (Twin brother); Osvaldo Daniel (Clone)

Lucas Ferraz/Lucas Ferrer is a fictional man and the series protagonist of the Brazilian telenovella O Clone (2001–02) created by Glória Perez, the actor Murilo Benício interpreted Lucas.

The character is portrayed by actor Mauricio Ochmann, in Telemundo's adaptation.

== Background ==
Lucas is a romantic and sensitive person. He is the son of Leonardo Ferrer and has a twin brother named Diego. His passion is to become a guitarist, but doesn't succeed because of his father's disapproval. He falls in love with Jade, a young Arab girl and fights for her love. His twin brother encounters a fatal accident when they were 20 years old. Being the only son left, he had to leave his ambition to be a guitarist and succeed Diego's place in his father's business. After a while he adopts his brother's ambitious personality and hangs out with different women.

== Family ==
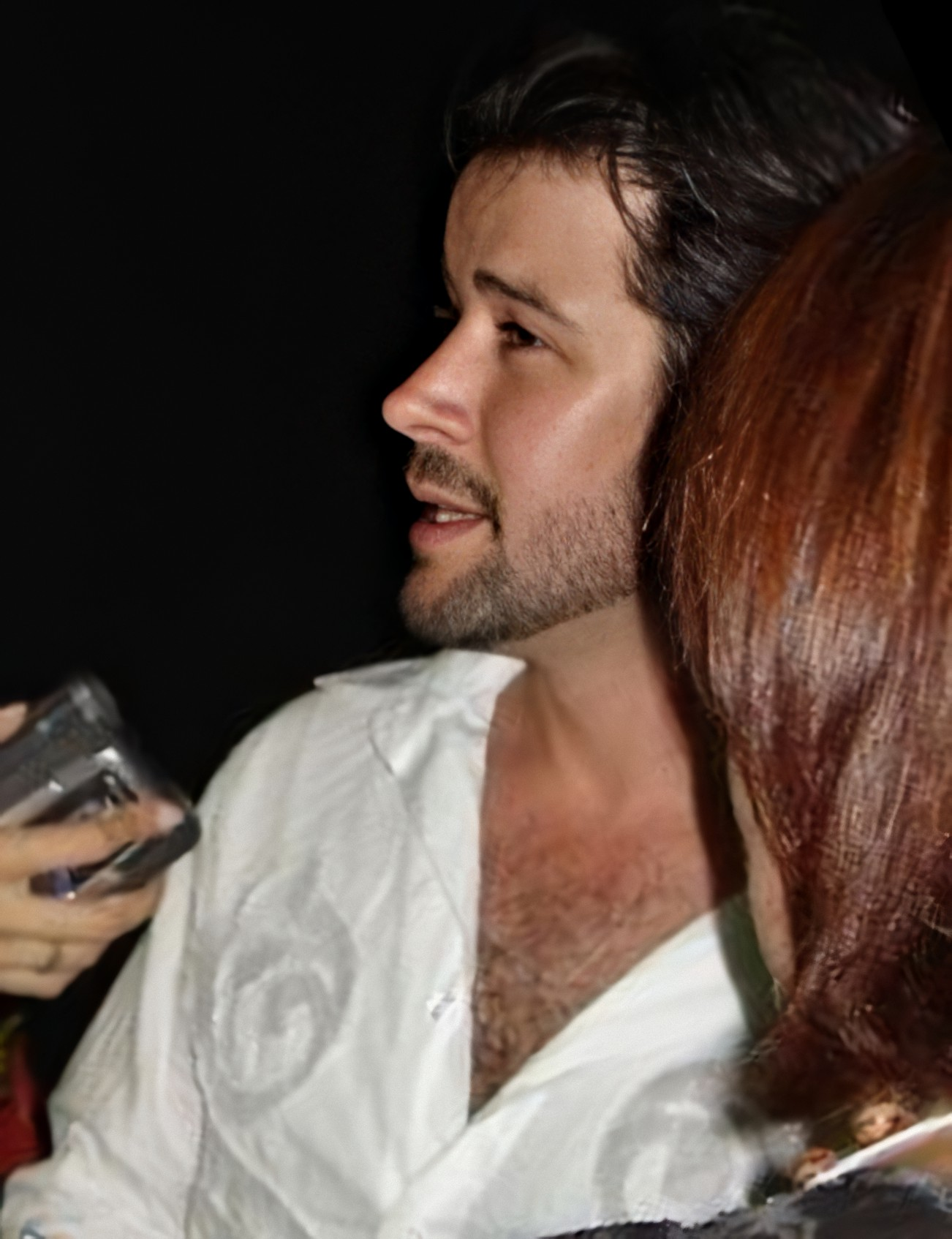
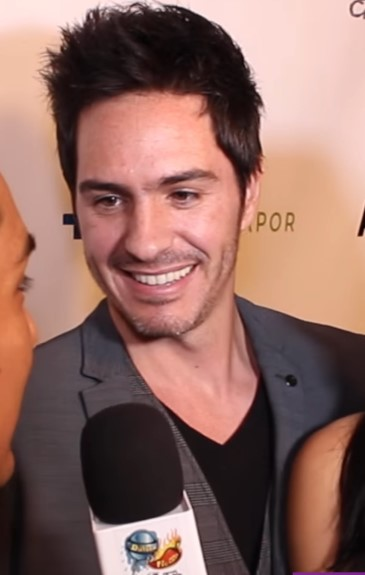
Murilo Benício (left) played Lucas in the Brazilian version and Mauricio Ochmann (right) played in the American version.

=== Mother ===
His mother died when she was giving birth to both Lucas and Diego. She had a mark behind her back which is inherited by both Lucas and Diego.

=== Father ===
Leonardo Ferrer, his father owns a company. He is very strict and tries to manage his son's life.

=== Diego Ferrer ===
Diego is Lucas' twin brother. Compared to Lucas, Diego is an extrovert young man and very daring.

== Relationships ==
=== Jade ===
Jade is lucas' love interest. They met at Uncle Ali's house in Morocco, when Albieri brought Lucas to the house. They first met when Jade was dancing to the Arabic music. Jade was wearing a traditional clothing. In Morocco, the dances and cloth only can be shown to their husband. According to their culture, a woman shall not show their face to a stranger. But on that day, Lucas saw her face and he immediately falls in love with Jade. They started to see each other and eventually few days later, Jade and Lucas had sex in their secret place.

=== Marisa ===
Marisa is Lucas' wife. She was actually secretly in love with Diego. Diego was going to attend her birthday that evening. Suddenly storm came and Diego faced the fatal helicopter crash. Because she was unable to express her feelings to Diego, she eventually turn his love to Lucas. She tried to make Lucas fall in love with her but she failed. They later got married after Lucas was disappointed with Jade's marriage. Later, Marisa is pregnant with Lucas' child.

== Children ==
=== Natalia ===
Natalia is Lucas and Marisa's daughter. She wanted her parents to be together and live happily. When she realizes that her parents marriage cannot be saved anymore, she lured herself to drug.

== Clone ==
=== Osvaldo Daniel ===
Even though he is the clone of Lucas, he has the same personalities of Diego, ambitious and goes with any woman. But he is also a bit sensitive and very romantic, who later on falls in love with Jade as well.
