= Dalton Vigh =

Brazilian actor (born 1964)

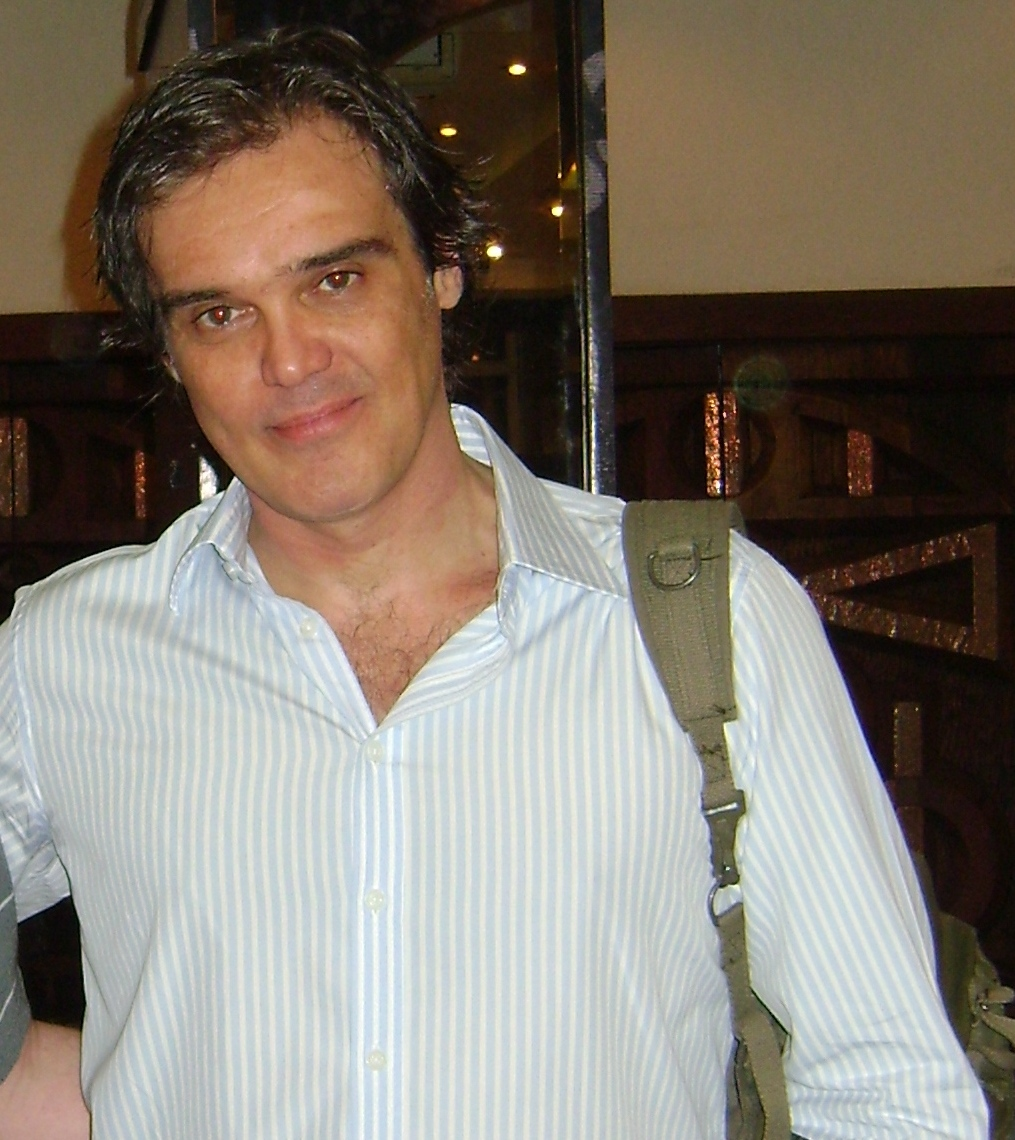
- Dalton Vigh in 2010
- Born: Dalton Vigh de Sousa Vales; July 10, 1964 (age 62); Rio de Janeiro, Brazil
- Occupation: Actor
- Years active: 1994–present
- Spouse: Camila Czerkes (m. 2012; div. 2023)
- Children: 2

Dalton Vigh de Sousa Vales (born July 10, 1964) is a Brazilian actor.

== Biography ==
At three years Dalton moved to Santos, and in 1986 moved to São Paulo.

Graduated in Advertising in the Methodist University of São Paulo, did not follow his career. He also studied drama at school Célia Helena.

== Career ==
Dalton's first job in television soap opera was the Tocaia Grande, 1995. He starred with Patrícia de Sabrit novels the Pérola Negra of SBT and Vidas Cruzadas of Rede Record.

Dalton gained notoriety when introducing the Top TV program in 2000. It was also host of the cable television channel People & Arts. But the greatest public recognition came with his interpretation of Said Rachid in the soap opera O Clone, 2001. Interpreted the historical character Luigi Rossetti in the miniseries A Casa das Sete Mulheres (2003).

After some work with fewer repercussions, Dalton returned to shine as the Clovis Moura villain in the soap opera O Profeta, 2006. The Prophet success earned him an invitation to star in the soap opera Duas Caras, 2007, written by Aguinaldo Silva, playing the villain (redeemed throughout history) Marconi Ferraço.

His film debut was in behind the scenes of 1999. In the theater, has acted in several plays, mainly comedies.

In 2009, the cast of the show Cinquentinha, in 2010 participated in the series S.O.S. Emergência, Na Forma da Lei and As Cariocas.

In 2011 was in series Lara com Z, and joined the cast of soap opera Fina Estampa of Rede Globo, as Renê Velmont, one of the protagonists.

In 2012, is the soap opera Salve Jorge of Glória Perez, interpreting the lawyer Carlos Flores Galvão. In 2015, he plays doctor Tomás in I Love Paraisópolis.

In 2016, he appeared in the telenovela Liberdade, Liberdade. In 2017, he did not renew his contract with Rede Globo and revealed plans to be a screenwriter and director, his desire to take a break in soap operas, and participation in HBO's series O Negócio.

== Personal life ==
Dalton maintained relationships with actress Micaela Góes (2000–2002), sister of actress Georgiana Góes, and the actress Bárbara Paz (2003–2005).

In 2011, he was engaged to actress Camila Czerkes, with whom he married later, and had twin children, Arthur and David.

== Filmography ==
=== Television ===
| Year | Title | Role | Notes |
|---|---|---|---|
| 1995 | Tocaia Grande | Venturinha | |
| 1996 | Xica da Silva | Frei Inquisidor Expedito | |
| 1997 | Os Ossos do Barão | Luigi | |
| 1998 | Pérola Negra | Tomás Álvares Toledo | |
| 1998 | Estrela de Fogo | Fernão | |
| 1999 | Andando nas Nuvens | Cícero | |
| 1999 | Terra Nostra | Aníbal | Participation |
| 2000 | Top TV | Presenter | |
| 2000 | Sãos & Salvos! | | Participation |
| 2000 | Vidas Cruzadas | Lucas | |
| 2001 | O Clone | Said Rachid | |
| 2002 | Os Normais | | Episode: "O Normal a Ser Feito" |
| 2003 | A Casa das Sete Mulheres | Luigi Rossetti | |
| 2003 | Retrato Falado | Walter Forster | Episode: "O Primeiro Beijo da TV" |
| 2004 | Malhação | Teacher Oscar Medeiros | Season 11 |
| 2005 | Começar de Novo | Johnny | Episodes: "March 16–April 11, 2005" |
| 2005 | Sob Nova Direção | Dr. Maurício | Episode: "Massagem pra Você" |
| 2005 | Linha Direta Justiça | Heinrich Himmler | Episode: "Justiça" |
| 2006 | Linha Direta Justiça | Danilo Stevanovich | Episode: "O Incêndio do Gran Circus Norte-Americano" |
| 2006 | O Profeta | Clóvis Moura | |
| 2007 | Duas Caras | Dr. Marconi Ferraço (Adalberto Rangel) | |
| 2008 | Casos e Acasos | Manoel | Episode: "Ele é Ela, Ela é Ele e Ela ou Eu" |
| 2009 | Negócio da China | Dr. Otávio de La Riva | Episodes: "January 16–March 13, 2009" |
| 2009 | Cinquentinha | Claus Martinez | |
| 2010 | S.O.S. Emergência | Dr. Tiago | Episode: "Hora de Ir pra Cama" |
| 2010 | Na Forma da Lei | César Borges | Episode: "Olho por Olho, Não Matarás" |
| 2010 | As Cariocas | Giuliano | Episode: "A Adúltera da Urca" |
| 2011 | Amor em quatro atos | Lauro | Episode: "Meu Único Defeito Foi Não Saber Te Amar" |
| 2011 | Lara com Z | Claus Martinez | |
| 2011 | Fina Estampa | Renê Velmont | |
| 2012 | As Brasileiras | Fernando | Episode: "A Doméstica de Vitória" |
| 2012 | Salve Jorge | Carlos Flores Galvão | |
| 2015 | I Love Paraisópolis | Tomás Bezerra | |
| 2016 | Liberdade, Liberdade | Dom Raposo | |
| 2018 | O Negócio | Rodolfo Sherman | Season 4 |
| 2018 | As Aventuras de Poliana | Otto | |
| 2022 | Poliana Moça | Otto | |

=== Films ===
| Year | Title | Role | Notes |
|---|---|---|---|
| 1995 | O Porão | George | Short film |
| 1999 | Por Trás do Pano | Tony | |
| 2004 | Vida de Menina | Alexandre | |
| 2005 | Mais uma Vez Amor | Businessman | |
| 2006 | Mulheres do Brasil | Bernardo | |
| 2011 | Corpos Celestes | Francisco | |
| 2014 | Jogo da Memória | Antonio | |
| 2016 | My Hindu Friend | Dr. Morris | |
| 2017 | A Comédia Divina | Mateus | |
| 2018 | Nada a Perder | Judge Ramos | |

== Theater ==
Parts
| Year | Title | Notes |
|---|---|---|
| | A Semente | |
| 1994 | Ressuscita-me | |
| 1996 | Futuro do Pretérito | |
| 1999 | As Viúvas | |
| 1999 | Camila Baker | |
| 2002 | A Importância de ser Fiel | 2002–2006 |
| 2004 | Medeia | |
| 2005 | Os Sete Gatinhos | |
| 2006 | Nunca se Sábado | |
| 2009 | Cloaca | |
| 2010 | Vamos | |
| 2013 | Azul Resplendor | 2013–2014 |
| 2017 | Uma Peça por Outra | |

== Nominations ==
- 2007: Contigo Award, for best supporting actor by the soap opera O Profeta.
- 2008: Contigo Award for best actor by the soap opera Duas Caras.
- 2008: Contigo Award best romantic couple by the soap opera Duas Caras.
- 2010: Arte Qualidade Brasil Award for best supporting actor by the serie Cinquentinha.
- 2012: Contigo Award for best supporting actor by the serie Lara com Z.
- 2012: Contigo Award for best actor by the soap opera Fina Estampa.
