= El Clon (TV series) =

Internationally produced Spanish-language telenovela

- Genre: Telenovela
- Created by: Roberto Stopello; Sandra Velasco
- Based on: O Clone by Glória Perez
- Directed by: Mauricio Cruz; Agustin Restrepo
- Creative director: Gabriela Monroy
- Starring: Mauricio Ochmann; Sandra Echeverría; Saúl Lisazo; Roberto Moll; Geraldine Zivic; Andrea López; Juan Pablo Raba; Daniel Lugo
- Music by: Oliver Camargo; José Carlos María; Nicolás Uribe
- Countries of origin: United States; Colombia
- Original language: Spanish
- No. of seasons: 1
- No. of episodes: 183

Production
- Executive producer: Hugo León Ferrer
- Production locations: Fez, Morocco; Miami, Florida, United States; Bogotá, Colombia
- Cinematography: Eduardo Carreño; Alfredo Zamudio
- Editor: Alba Merchan Hamann
- Camera setup: Multi-camera
- Production companies: RTI Producciones; Globo Internacional; Telemundo Studios

Original release
- Network: Telemundo
- Release: February 15 – October 29, 2010

El Clon (lit. 'The Clone') is a Spanish-language telenovela released in 2010, produced by the U.S.-based television network Telemundo, the Colombian TV production house RTI Televisión and the Brazilian network Globo. It is a remake of O Clone, a Brazilian telenovela that originally aired on Globo in 2001 and on Telemundo in 2002. This limited run melodrama, which starred Mauricio Ochmann and Sandra Echeverría, deals with topics such as drug trafficking, cloning and Islam.

Telemundo executive Mark Santana called El Clon "the most ambitious telenovela in the history of television". This melodrama features a love triangle featuring Lucas, a handsome hero, challenging his clone for the love of an enticing, exotic woman. Lucas is young when he falls for a young Arab girl named Jade. She is caught between modern values and her Islamic upbringing. They separate and two decades pass. Then a strange turn of luck brings the pair together. Then Jade meets the clone, who is just like Lucas, but twenty years younger. She must choose between the man she loved and the memory she cherishes.

== History ==
The remake debuted on February 15, 2010. It was filmed in Fez, Morocco, with some scenes shot on location in the Middle East, and in Bogotá, where Girardot's city represents Fez and Miami, although the main setting is Miami. It includes several members of the original production team, including screenwriter Glória Perez and director Jayme Monjardim.

As part of the 2010 season, Telemundo aired the serial weeknights at 8pm/7c central, replacing Más Sabe el Diablo. The series ended with a two-hour finale on October 29, 2010 with Aurora replacing it. As with most of its other soap operas, the network broadcasts English subtitles as closed captions on CC3. As part of the production deal, Globo agreed to embargo distribution of the original Portuguese version for five years.

== Plot ==
The telenovela tells the story of Jade and Lucas. Jade is a young woman of Arab descent, who has to live with her father's family in Morocco after the death of her mother. Lucas is a young romantic, and son of a powerful businessman. When Lucas is on vacation in Morocco, he meets Jade, and the two of them fall in love. However, cultural differences do not allow them to be together.

After the sudden death of her mother, Jade returns to live in Morocco with her family. She feels forced into Muslim culture. One night while dancing, she falls in love at first sight with a stranger.

Lucas is a man who lives among the luxuries from the success of Leonardo Ferrer, his father, owner of an exporting firm. Lucas longs to be a musician, but his family tries to persuade him to become interested in their business. Lucas's twin brother Diego, is the candidate to inherit Leonardo's empire. Diego is a cheerful and enterprising conquistador that ends in a fight without truce with his father, because of his father's girlfriend.

Uncle Ali arranges for his two nieces, Jade and Latiffa to marry Said and Mohammed. After Latiffa's wedding to Mohammed, she, her husband, and Jade go to Miami.

Unfortunately for Leonardo, Diego dies in an accident when he goes to his girlfriend's party. Lucas's family does not accept his relationship with Jade and she is unable to leave her family to be with Lucas. Eventually, she returns to Morocco. Lucas follows her in an attempt to get her back to the United States. However, he arrives in time to see her wedding to Said.

Lucas takes the place of his brother in both the company and the hand of his girlfriend Marisa, whom he married shortly after. Meanwhile, in Miami, the scientist Augusto Albieri, upset by the death of Diego (which occurred on January 24, 1988), secretly cloned Lucas and implanting the embryo into Dora, resulting in an exact genetic clone of Diego: Daniel.

However, the earlier mistakes do not end the love story between Lucas and Jade, and end up reliving a love match. Marisa and Lucas separate, until news of a daughter brings them back together.

The story has a twist twenty years later: Lucas, replacing his brother, had a daughter with his girlfriend Marisa called Natalia, who is a proud product of both her parents and her grandfather for her academic excellence, but she feels she does not enjoy life more because she stays in her room alone, studying and amid all her troubles, was hired by her grandfather's chauffeur, ex-fighter, Alejandro, but Marisa does not allow her daughter to marry someone of lower class. Subsequently, Natalia becomes an alcoholic starts to abuse drugs.

Daniel, the clone, has also grown resentful toward his mother for having Albieri away from that known as "Dad," Dora and her mother wanted a simple life rather than luxuries for him, then had to move away from the child's doctor, so Daniel escapes to find Albieri.

Jade has become a mother and had to keep Said to educate her daughter to the customs of their culture provides, but Said has a contract with the Ferrer business. Jade and Lucas again have that thirst to be together, but to achieve the task will be to overcome several difficult tests and all downhill when Daniel appears in the life of Jade, making people swirling around Lucas and Daniel have serious problems in their lives.

Escobar cannot regain Clara, and after several attempts, gives up, then Anita's friend Louise, seduces him, plays with him and tells him to get one that's worth.

Natalia, after having her baby had trouble breathing, improved and remained healthy. Marisa asks that hospitalize her against addictions to avoid any harm to the baby. Natalian enters rehab and as months pass, she succeeds, she continues to struggle daily with the help of Alejandro, his family and his godfather, Enrique. Now recovered, along with Fernando, opened a clinic for drug addicts and put "Paula" which was the name of their drug-addicted friend who never saw again.

Marisa comprises all agree that Lucas go with Jade leaves the house on the road. At the beach, she meets a man who made her laugh while she was sad and so began a love sincere and very strong with she was happy.

Dora makes a demand for Leonardo and all celebrate in her house, but now Daniel is gone, then Miguel, Dora's new partner, says that trust because he always comes back. Daniel while in fear of being killed Albieri (as it sought to send him to prison), it follows Albieri in the desert where he says he let Daniel do not agree and both continue to walk through the desert, this being the last scene appearing in both.

Luisa and the reporter who wanted information about the clone, look for Albieri. Luisa wants to return with him and the reporter who no one believes that the clone exists, wants to prove herself, giving evidence to the world.

Alicia, now away from everyone, becomes a maid and tries to seduce her boss.

Mohamed and Latifa live happily with his family, Samira's boyfriend decides to become a Muslim to be with her, so he is taught by Mohamed, who accepts the relationship.

Nazira escapes with Pablo and live very happy with him.

Said wants to see Jadiya happy and lets her see Jade every week, but Said has another wife who daily fight with Ranya, but is equally happy in their own way.

Karla and her mother go to the beach, where they are choosing the next one to be cheated by them. Cristina and Leonardo have twins and everything starts again in the Ferrer house. Uncle Ali married Zoraida and both live happily together, she makes doesn't allow fighting at home but peace, in the end Ali accepts Jade back.

== Cast and characters ==
Actor	Character	Relation
Mauricio Ochmann	Lucas Ferrer; Diego Ferrer; Osvaldo Daniel Padilla	Leonardo's son, Diego's brother, in love with Jade; Leonardo's son, Lucas's brother The clone of Lucas
Sandra Echeverría	Jade Mebarak	Said's wife, Khadija's mother, in love with Lucas and was also in love with Daniel when thinking it was Lucas, was also married to Zein
Saul Lisazo	Leonardo Ferrer	Lucas and Diego's father, in love with Christina
Roberto Moll	Augusto Albieri	Doctor, Leonardo's friend, Luisa's husband, a human who made a clone
Geraldine Zivic	Christina Miranda	Friend of Dora, Vicky, Jade and Lucas, in love with Leonardo
Andrea Lopez	Marisa Antonelli	Lucas' wife, Natalia's mother, Said's lover
Juan Pablo Raba	Said Hashim	Mohamed and Nazira's brother, Jade's ex-husband
Daniel Lugo	Ali Rashid	Jade and Latiffa's uncle, in love with Zoraida
Luz Stella Luengas	Zoraida	Ali's servant and Jade's confidant, falls in love with Ali; later marries him.
Carla Giraldo	Latiffa	Jade's cousin, Mohamed's wife, mother of Samira i Mohamed Amin
Majida Issa	Rania Castañeda de la caridad	Wife of Said
Mijail Mulkay Bordon	Mohamed Hashim	Said and Nazira's brother, Latiffa's husband, father of Samira i Mohamed Amin
Andrea Montenegro	Nazira Hashim	Said and Mohamed's sister, formally in love with Osvaldo, later with Pablo
Tiberio Cruz	Zein	Said's friend, was married to Jade
Indhira Serrano	Dora Encarnacion Padilla	Daniel's mother, in love with Osvaldo
Pedro Telemaco	Osvaldo Medina	In love with Dora, tricked Dora into thinking he was fertile, ends up in jail
Alexander Rodriguez	Julio	Doctor
Abel Rodríguez	Enrique "Ricky"	Alcoholic, in love with Carolina
Estefania Gomez	Vicky	Christina and Dora's friend
Adriana Romero	Luisa	Doctor Albieri's wife
Victor Turpin	Victor	
Laura Perico	Natalia Ferrer Antonelli	Marisa's daughter
