= A Regra do Jogo =

- Genre: Telenovela; Drama; Crime Thriller
- Created by: João Emanuel Carneiro
- Directed by: Amora Mautner
- Starring: Alexandre Nero; Giovanna Antonelli; Vanessa Giácomo; Cauã Reymond; Marco Pigossi; Eduardo Moscovis; Tony Ramos; Cássia Kis Magro; Susana Vieira; Deborah Evelyn; Bárbara Paz; José de Abreu; Renata Sorrah; Marcos Caruso; Tonico Pereira
- Opening theme: Juízo Final by Alcione
- Country of origin: Brazil
- Original language: Portuguese
- No. of episodes: 167; 150 (International Version) (list of episodes)

Production
- Production locations: Rio de Janeiro, Brazil
- Camera setup: Multiple-camera setup

Original release
- Network: TV Globo
- Release: August 31, 2015 – March 11, 2016

A Regra do Jogo (English title: Rules of The Game) is a Brazilian primetime telenovela, created by João Emanuel Carneiro for TV Globo from August 31, 2015 to 11 March 2016.

Written by João Emanuel Carneiro, and directed by Amora Mautner. Starring Alexandre Nero, Giovanna Antonelli, Vanessa Giacomo, Cauã Reymond, Eduardo Moscovis, Marco Pigossi, Susana Vieira, Tony Ramos and Cássia Kis.

In 2016, the telenovela was nominated for two International Emmy Awards, for Best Telenovela and Best Actor for Alexandre Nero.

== Plot ==
Romero Rômulo (Alexandre Nero) is a hero of the people. For others, he is just a selfish crook. He heads an institution that bestows former convicts into society. Little does anyone know that it is also a way of recruiting criminals for the clique he belongs to and through which he earns good money through several robberies and scams. His lover Atena (Giovanna Antonelli), is a swindler who misses no chances. Unprincipled and immoral, she only wants to take advantage of Romero. But deep down, she hides true feelings for him.

One of Romero's mortal enemies is his stepfather, Zé Maria (Tony Ramos), whom he accused in the past of killing twenty people during a massacre inside a bus. Djanira (Cássia Kiss) has never forgiven her son Romero for the testimony, because the love of her life had to become a fugitive from justice. Besides, she had to raise her stepson, the former wrestler Juliano (Cauã Reymond), and her adopted daughter, the virtuous Toia (Vanessa Giácomo) by herself. They grew up together and soon started dating, but Juliano's desire for revenge keeps getting in the way of the couple's romance. Juliano is released on probation for suspected drug trafficking whereas he also seeks for justice and intends to prove his father's innocence, pointing all the blame to the dangerous syndicate.

== Cast ==
Actor/Actress	Character
Alexandre Nero	Romero Rômulo de Oliveira / Francisco Silva
Giovanna Antonelli	Atena Torremolinos / Francineide Maria do Socorro / Helena Soares da Silva
Vanessa Giácomo	Tóia (Maria Vitória Noronha)
José de Abreu	Gibson Stewart (DAD)
Tony Ramos	José "Zé" Maria Pereira / Pedro Vargas
Marco Pigossi	Dante Stewart de Oliveira
Cauã Reymond	Juliano Evangelista Pereira
Cássia Kis Magro	Djanira de Oliveira
Susana Vieira	Adisabeba dos Santos Stewart
Tonico Pereira	Ascânio Trindade
Marcos Caruso	Feliciano Stewart
Eduardo Moscovis	Orlando Levy / Ubiraci da Costa (Bira)
Carolina Dieckmann	Lara Firmino da Costa
Deborah Evelyn	Kiki (Maria Christine Barroso Stewart)
Renata Sorrah	Eleonora Barroso Stewart (Nora)
Bárbara Paz	Nelita (Maria Elisa Barroso Stewart)
Bruna Linzmeyer	Belisa Stewart
Marcello Novaes	Vavá (Valtércio Stewart)
dj Gralha	dj Gralha (Vinicius Lopes)
Maria Padilha	Claudine
Suzana Pires	Janete de Sousa
Fernanda Souza	Mel (Melisse de Araújo)
Allan Souza Lima	Nenemzinho
Bruno Mazzeo	Rui
Giovanna Lancellotti	Luana Sampaio Stewart
Otávio Müller	Breno Sampaio
Alexandra Richter	Dalila Sampaio Stewart
Johnny Massaro	Cesário Stewart
Júlia Rabello	Úrsula Stewart
Giselle Batista	Duda
Cris Vianna	Indira
Paula Burlamaqui	Sueli
Monique Alfradique	Tina
Roberta Rodrigues	Ninfa
Thaíssa Carvalho	Andressa Turbinada
Letícia Lima	Alisson
Jackson Antunes	Tio
Fábio Lago	Oziel
Letícia Colin	Paty
João Baldasserini	Victor
Ricardo Pereira	Lucas Faustini
Douglas Tavares	Abner
Felipe Roque	Kim Sampaio Stewart
Osvaldo Mil	Juca
Maeve Jinkings	Domingas
Karine Teles	Sumara Mitta
Séfora Rangel	Conceição
Carla Cristina	Dinorah
Danilo Ferreira	Iraque
Amaurih Oliveira	Dênis

== Ratings ==
According to IBOPE, in the week of September 28 to October 4, 2015, A Regra do Jogo was the most watched program of the Brazilian television, with an average of 8,013,730 viewers per minute, taking into account a projection of 15 metropolitan areas.

Timeslot	Episodes	Premiere		Finale		Rank	Season	Rating average
Timeslot	Episodes	Date	Viewers (in points)	Date	Viewers (in points)	Rank	Season	Rating average
Mondays—Saturdays; 9:15pm	167	August 31, 2015	31.0	March 11, 2016	40.0	1	2015–16	27.9

== Awards and nominations ==
Year	Award	Category	Nominated	Result
2015	Melhores do Ano	Best Actor of Telenovela	Alexandre Nero	Won
2015	Melhores do Ano	Best Actress of Telenovela	Giovanna Antonelli	Won
2015	Melhores do Ano	Best Supporting Actor	Juliano Cazarré	Nominated
2015	Melhores do Ano	Best Supporting Actor	Tonico Pereira	Nominated
2015	Melhores do Ano	Best Supporting Actress	Bruna Linzmeyer	Nominated
2015	Melhores do Ano	Best Supporting Actress	Cássia Kis	Nominated
2015	Troféu APCA	Best Actor	Alexandre Nero	Won
2015	Troféu APCA	Best Actor	Tony Ramos	Nominated
2016	44th International Emmy Awards	Best Telenovela	A Regra do Jogo	Nominated

== International release ==
"The Rules of the Game" will be launched on the international market in fall 2016; Globo has already started international pre-sales.

== Soundtrack ==
- Photo: Giovanna Antonelli as Atena

A Regra do Jogo – International

Soundtrack album by Various Artists
- Released: November 13, 2015
- Label: Som Livre

No.	Title	Artist(s)	Length
1.	"Juízo Final"	Alcione
2.	"Ser Humano"	Zeca Pagodinho
3.	"O Amor Mandou Dizer"	Xande de Pilares
4.	"Quando o Morcego Doar Sangue"	Péricles
5.	"Eu te amo, te amo, te amo"	Roberto Carlos
6.	"Coração Selvagem"	Ana Carolina
7.	"Dia Clarear"	Banda do Mar
8.	"Para Um Amor no Recife"	Banda da Viola
9.	"Papel de Bobão"	Mosquito
10.	"Safadim"	Aviões do Forró
11.	"Casado Também Namora"	Frank Aguiar
12.	"A Dona do Barraco"	Calcinha Preta
13.	"De Ladin"	Dream Team do Passinho
14.	"Só No Charminho"	Gang do Eletro
15.	"Nuvem de Lágrimas"	Fafá de Belém
16.	"Tô na Vida"	Ana Canas
17.	"Danse Macabre"	Scalene
