= Branimals: The Forest Is Ours =

2011 film directed by Paulo Munhoz

- Theatrical poster
- Portuguese: Brichos: A Floresta é Nossa
- Directed by: Paulo Munhoz
- Written by: Paulo Munho; Erico Beduschi
- Starring: Marcelo Tas; Fabiula Nascimento; Antonio Abujamra
- Release date: 25 December 2012
- Running time: 83 minutes
- Country: Brazil
- Language: Portuguese

Branimals: The Forest Is Ours (Portuguese: Brichos: A Floresta é Nossa) is a 2012 Brazilian animated film directed by Paulo Munhoz. A sequel of the 2007 film Brichos, the film was preceded by a comic book with the same title, published by Munhoz in 2011.

== Plot ==
Teenage anteater Bandeira and his father Olavo travels to the Middle East on a jeep, while the jaguar Tales and Jairzinho the coati on summer vacation. Dumontzinho the Rufous hornero went on an exchange program in North America where he meet a panda named Pandinha.

Everything is normal until Tales and Jairzinho discover the return of Ratão who is doing business with an American executive named Sam Baldeagle. The two reveal to be working under for Mr. Birdestroy a Bull Terrier who is the CEO of the Brainforest and wants to take over the Brichos village, as well as having an alliance with the dromedary terrorist Al Corcova. Meanwhile, Bandeira and Olavo end up being trapped in the desert until they are rescued by a group of gecko thieves called "Lagaregues" led by Abdul-Aziz. Dumontzinho and Pandinha find Mr. Birdestroy's hideout and manage to send information to the village about Birdestroy's plan.

Later Ratão makes an agreement with the mayor of the Brichos village to present the project to buy the village to the residents, going so far as to want to bribe them with money, but they end up losing in the vote after Tales shows a video raising awareness about the importance of Forest. After failing to sell Ratão and Sam, they are fired by Birdestroy, who goes with Al Corcova to building a space station and use a glass to set fire to the forest. However, Bandeira, Olavo, Abdul, Dumontzinho and Pandinha manage to get a military spaceship and invade the Al Corcova base, as they successfully destroys the space station, Thus saving the forest.

At the end after the space station destroyed, it reveals Birdestroy and Al Corcova are still alive, so they escaped through a spacesuit where they appear floating far away from planet Earth. The film ends with a joke where Al Corcova farts inside the suit.

== Cast ==
- Marcelo Tas
- Fabiula Nascimento
- Antônio Abujamra
