= Brichos =

2007 film directed by Paulo Munhoz

- Theatrical release poster
- Directed by: Paulo Munhoz
- Starring: Marino Junior; Mário Schoemberger; Renet Lyon; Fabíula Nascimento; Michelle Pucci
- Music by: Vadeco; Jorge Falcón; Vina Lacerda
- Distributed by: Panda Filmes
- Release date: February 2, 2007
- Running time: 77 minutes
- Country: Brazil
- Language: Portuguese

Brichos is a 2007 Brazilian animated film directed by Paulo Munhoz.

The film portrays the Brazilian culture through national wildlife animals. The film gained a sequel titled Brichos – A Floresta é Nossa.

== Plot ==
Tales, Jairzinho and Bandeira are crazy about video games and will come together to create a perfect fighter for the local video game championship. They went on a quest that will eventually revealing a secret in the forest where they live.
