= Jade (El Clon) =

Jade Rachid (BR)
- O Clone character
- First appearance: "Encuentro Divino"
- Created by: Glória Perez
- Portrayed by: Giovanna Antonelli (O Clone)

In-universe information
- Spouse: Said Hashim; Zein; Lucas Ferraz
- Children: Khadijah (with Said Hashim)
- Relatives: Latiffa (cousin); Ali (paternal uncle); Nazira Hashim (sister-in-law); Mohammed Hashim (brother-in-law)

Jade El Adib Rachid/Jade Mebarak is a fictional Arab woman and the series protagonist of the Brazilian telenovella O Clone (2001–02), the actress Giovanna Antonelli interpreted Jade to international acclaim.

== Background ==
Jade is the only child of her parents. Her parents were of Moroccan descent. Despite being born into a Muslim family, she spent her childhood and teenage years in Rio de Janeiro, Brazil. Due to this, she has difficulties adapting to the conservative views and rules of Islam when she returns to Morocco.

== Family ==
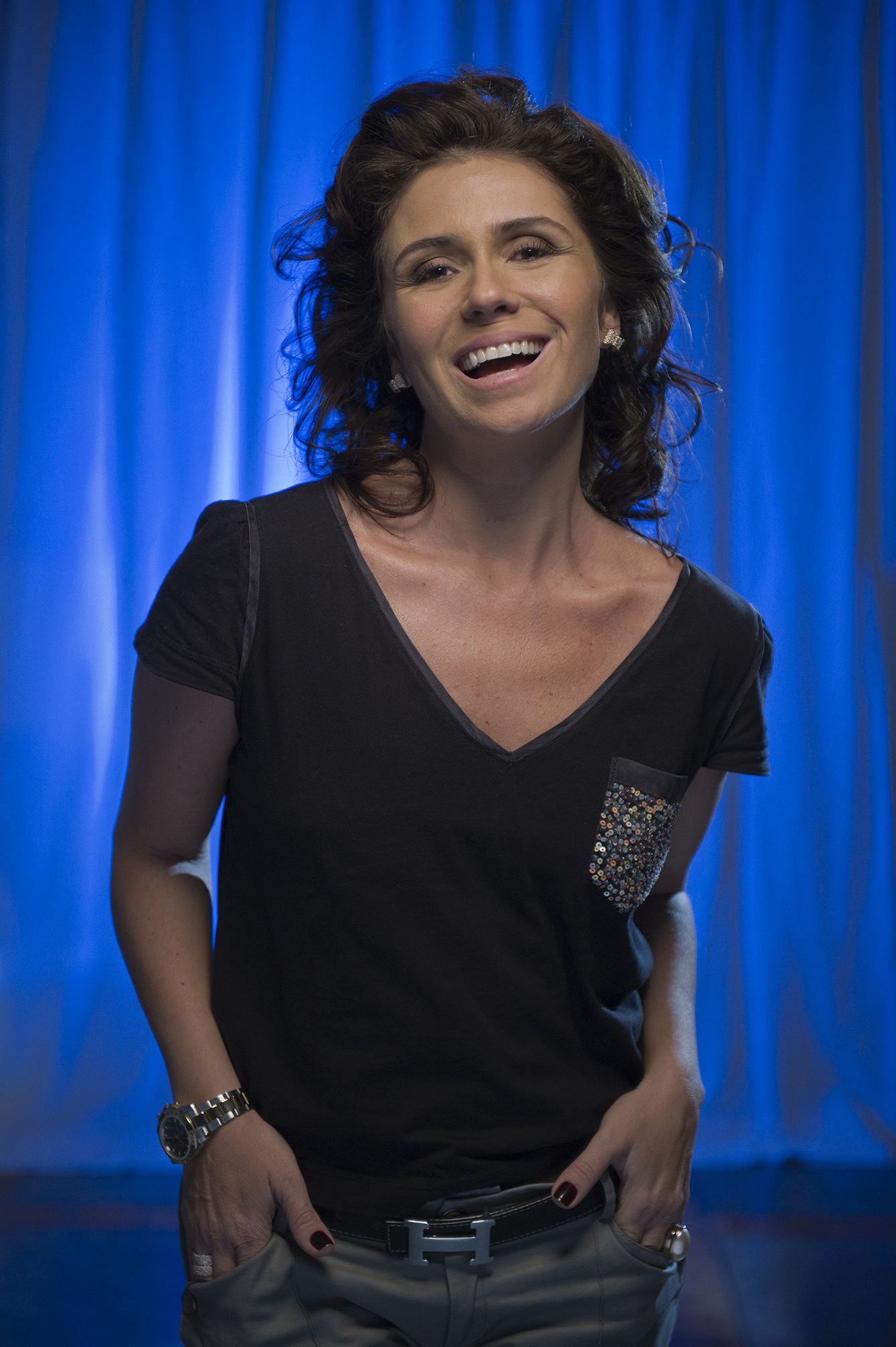
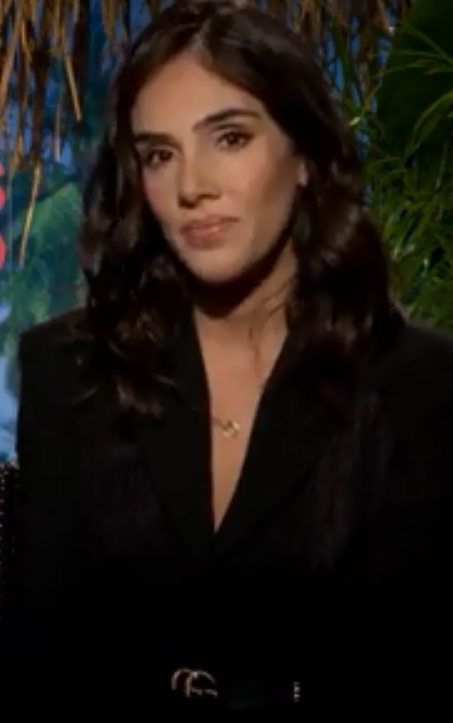
Giovanna Antonelli (left) played Jade in the Brazilian version and Sandra Echeverría (right) played in the American version.

=== Mother ===
Jade lost her mother during her teenage years. On her deathbed, she requested that Jade return to her homeland, Morocco, to live with Ali, her paternal uncle.

=== Uncle Ali ===
Ali is Jade's paternal uncle. When Jade's father died, it was the tradition for Ali to move into his house, as Jade is considered his family. However, at Jade's mother's pleading, he decides to let Jade move to Brazil with her mother.

After the death of her mother, Jade moves back to Morocco to live with Uncle Ali at her mother's dying request. When she arrives to Morocco, He is not pleased with Jade's occidental way of thinking. Uncle Ali proceeds to ask Jade to learn the Islamic upbringings, seeing as how he was wrong about her mother. Unfortunately, Jade keeps committing haraams (sins) and constantly places Ali's good name in jeopardy.

== Relationships ==
=== Lucas ===
Lucas Ferraz is Jade's love interest. They meet at Uncle Ali's house in Morocco moments after Jade arrives. He instantly falls in love with her when he sees her dancing to Arabic music. Jade notices him and falls in love with him too. They meet in secret and make plans to run away together many, many times, each of them ending in heartbreak. After finding out that Said will kill Lucas if he ever comes near Jade again, she leads him to believe that she never really loved him and was only looking to have some fun. This leads Lucas to fall into despair. To rid himself of the pain, he throws himself into work, trying to become the son his father, Leonidas Ferraz, has always wanted. He eventually marries his deceased twin brother's girlfriend, Maysa, and they have a daughter together, Mel. Despite the heartache Jade has put him through and all the time that has passed without seeing each other, Lucas is still in love with her and firmly believes that they are meant to be, despite the unsporting attitudes he gets from his family, friends and sometimes even Jade herself.

=== Said Rashid ===
Said is Jade's first husband. He was originally chosen by Sidi Ali to be Latiffa's husband but later they found out that they were nursed by the same wetnurse (which according to the Islam means that they are siblings and cannot marry). Because she is still in love with Lucas, Jade tries to prevent the marriage numerous times but fails. He and Jade are soon married, and on their wedding night, Said discovers that Jade is no longer a virgin. He knew about the love between Jade and Lucas even before the wedding. Nonetheless, due to him having fallen in love with her, he cuts himself and bleeds on the sheet to prove that Jade's virginity was taken that night and to spare her the punishment of the 100 lashes.

Jade, on the brink of depression because of her marriage, later tries over and over again to make Said divorce her, concluding that she'd rather be alone than with a man she does not love. These attempts fail until one day she succeeds to awake her husband's rage and he announces his divorces. It seems as if Jade has finally succeeded with Sidi Ali even planning to send her back to Brazil for her to begin her education. Shortly after that, Jade finds out that she is pregnant with Said's child. She becomes depressed as she does not want the child, and later she realizes that she won't be able to keep the child. As is the custom, after the baby is born, the child will stay with its father, Said. The child is born, and Said, who has not changed his mind about divorce, names her Khadijah, the name with which Jade's father wanted to name her. After giving birth, Jade tries to escape with her daughter. She takes refuge in the ruins where she would previously meet with Lucas but is found by Sidi Ali's men. She is taken back to Said's house where she pleads with him to accept her again as a wife and let her be with her child. Said is amazed to hear this from her, and because he still loves her, Said accepts her back.

Years later, when Jade and Lucas meet again, they make a plan to run away together, but this time they'll bring Khadijja along as well. Said soon finds out about this and in outrage, divorces Jade. He does keep Khadijja with him, who gladly accepts after finding out her mother's plan. Said, depressed by this decision, wants to remarry Jade. This however cannot happen because according to Arabic customs, Jade must marry another man before Said can marry her again. Said then goes to his friend Zain, and asks him to marry Jade for a day and then return her so that he may marry her again.

=== Zain ===
Zain is Jade's second husband. He does not intend to marry Jade at first, but after getting to know her and developing feelings for her, he changed his mind and asked Jade to stay with him for another six month.

=== Leo ===
Leo is Lucas' clone. He not only resembles Lucas, but also shares the same feelings towards Jade.

== Children ==
=== Khadija ===
Khadija is Jade and Said's daughter. All she really wants is for her parents to be together and to be able to live happily with them. When she finds out her mother is in love with Lucas, she is enraged and rejects her.

== Nieces and nephew ==
=== Samira ===
Samira is Jade's niece. She is the daughter of Latiffa and Mohammed. She resembles Jade in spirit as she, like her aunt, was raised in a foreign country where her family's traditions and ways of life are not common.
