= Rhaisa Batista =

Brazilian model and actress

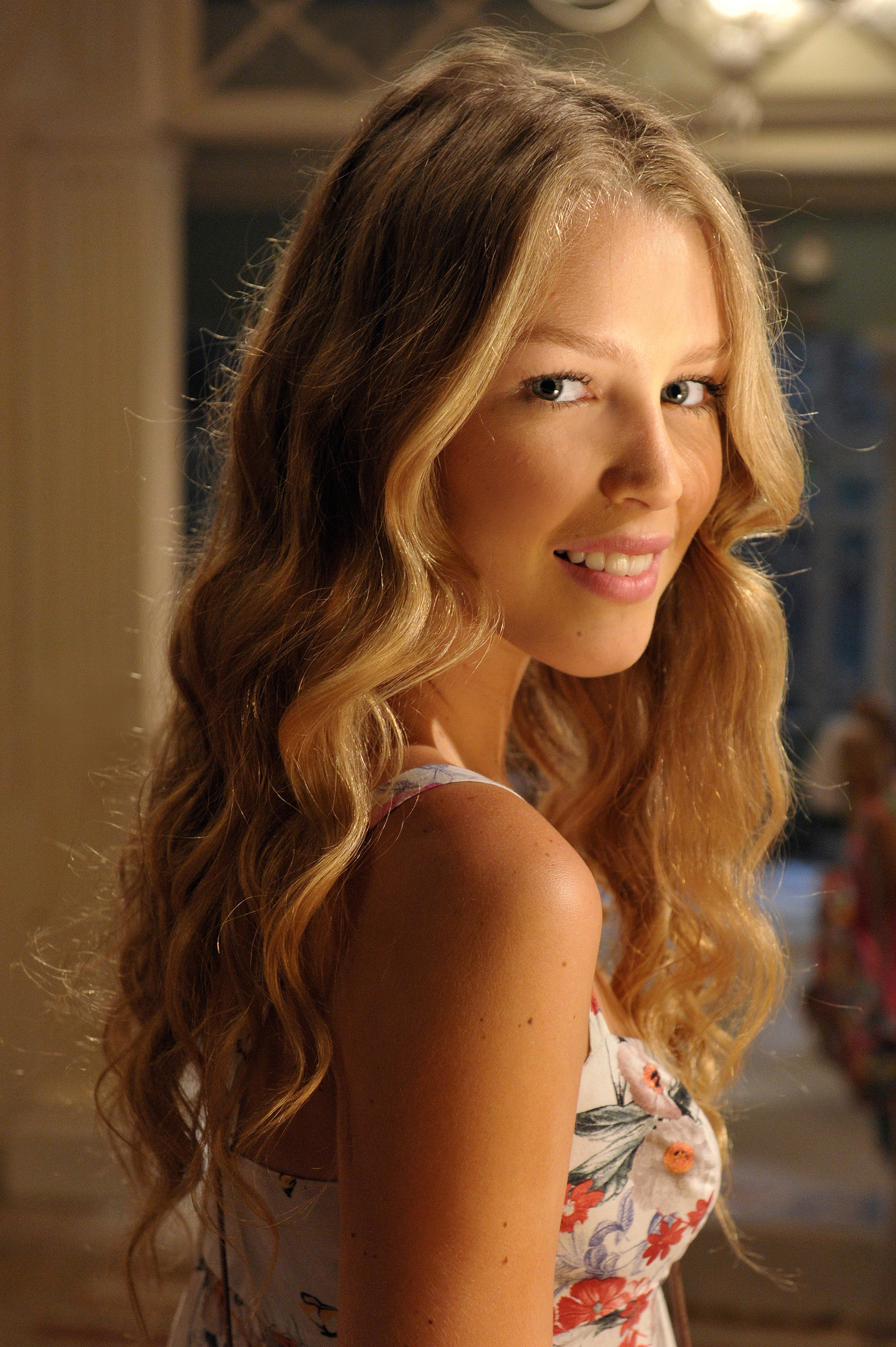
- Rhaisa during photoshoot
- Born: Rhaisa Gomes Batista; March 8, 1990 (age 36); Recife, Brazil
- Modeling information
- Height: 1.78 m (5 ft 10 in)
- Hair color: Blonde
- Eye color: Blue
- Agency: Ten Model Management

Rhaisa Gomes Batista (born March 8, 1990) is a Brazilian model and actress.

== Biography ==
Daughter of a civil servant and a housewife, Rhaisa was born in Recife but was raised in Lagoa de Itaenga, in the interior of the state, where her parents live.

Rhaisa started working as a model as a teenager in Recife, and soon moved to work in São Paulo. She did several fashion shows, editorials, and campaigns in Brazil and abroad.

In 2012, she was invited to participate in the series Louco por Elas and later debuted in soap operas at six o'clock in Lado a Lado, playing Esther Vieira.

== Filmography ==
=== Television ===
Year	Title	Role	Notes
2012	Louco por Elas	Sofia	Episode: "March 12"
2012	Lado a Lado	Esther Lemos Vieira	
2013	Malhação	Ulla	
2013	Joia Rara	Thereza	Episodes: "October 26–28"
2014	O Caçador	Liandra (girl who helps André)	
2014	Império	Luíza	
2015	Verdades Secretas	Mayra Chagas	
2017	Sem Volta	Malena Villen Barreto	
2019–2020	Bom Sucesso	Marie	
2019	Vai que Cola	Emily Fernandes	
2021	Gênesis	Muriel	
2022	Todas as Garotas em Mim	Heloísa Torres Sampaio	
2022–2023	Reis	Rispa	
2024	Good Morning, Verônica	Melina	
2024	No Rancho Fundo	Fé	
2025	Vale Tudo	Cláudia	

=== Film ===
Year	Title	Role
2015	S.O.S. Mulheres ao Mar 2	Anitta
2016	Minha Mãe É Uma Peça 2	Cecília
2019	Recife Assombrado	Rúbia
