= Giovanna Antonelli =

Brazilian actress, television host, and producer (born 1976)

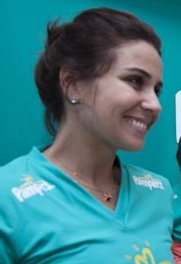
- Antonelli in 2025
- Born: Giovanna Antonelli Prado; 18 March 1976 (age 50); Rio de Janeiro, Brazil
- Occupations: Actress; TV host; producer
- Years active: 1990–present
- Spouses: Ricardo Medina (m. 2000; div. 2002) Robert LoCascio (m. 2007; div. 2007) Leonardo Nogueira (m. 2009)
- Children: 3

Giovanna Antonelli Prado (Portuguese: [ʒioˈvɐ̃nɐ ɐ̃toˈnɛli]; born 18 March 1976) is a Brazilian actress, television host, and producer.

== Biography ==
=== 1991–1999: Beginning of career and first works ===
In 1991, at age 15, Antonelli appeared in the children's show Clube da Criança TV program, which was screened on the Rede Manchete TV network hosted by Angélica. Antonelli was one of the angeliquetes, stage assistants on the program. In 1994, Antonelli debuted as an actress in the soap opera Tropicaliente, screened by Rede Globo broadcast between May and December 1994. At 18, Giovanna played Benvinda character in the novel. Soon after, she returned to Manchete to act in Tocaia Grande (1995), by Duca Rachid, Mário Teixeira and Marcos Lazarini, as the protagonist Ressú, and in Xica da Silva (1996) by Walcyr Carrasco as the villain Elvira part of a love triangle that had great impact. In 1996, Antonelli returned to Rede Machete for two telenovelas, after being recognized for Xica da Silva. After this success, she returned to Globo as Judy in Corpo Dourado (1998), by Antônio Calmon in a love triangle with the characters of Felipe Camargo and Fábio Jr.

After appearing as Violet prostitute in the telenovela Força de um Desejo, of Gilberto Braga, joined the cast of the first Múltipla Escolha season Choose the series Malhação, interpreting the character Isa, Character daughter of Nuno Leal Maia.

=== 2000–2006: Laços de Família, O Clone and Da Cor do Pecado ===
In 2000, Antonelli appeared interpreting another prostitute, Capitu, in Laços de Família, the telenovela by Manoel Carlos. The chemistry with her love interest, actor Luigi Baricelli, captivated audiences and critics. She received numerous accolades and won awards for Breakthrough Actress and two for Best Actress. Also in 2000, she debuted in the cinema with a cameo in the film Bossa Nova, directed by Bruno Barreto. Soon after she played her first role as a protagonist in O Clone (2001), by Gloria Perez.

In 2001, following the success of Laços de Família, Antonelli played the protagonist Jade, a Muslim divided between love and religious obligations, in the telenovela O Clone by Gloria Perez. Her character dictated fashion in the streets with veils, jewelry and exotic makeup that characterized a Muslim. Besides being successful in Brazil the character has attracted fans in several other countries where the telenovela was broadcast. She earned six awards, one of which was the Contigo Prize for Best Romantic Couple with Murilo Benício. In 2002, in the movie Avassaladoras, she played Laura, a successful woman who seeks a boyfriend through a wedding agency. In the film, she stars with Reynaldo Gianecchini, with whom she would appear in other works on TV. Participation in the film earned Antonelli the Crystal Lens Award for Best Actress at the Brazilian Film Festival in Miami.

After multiple successes, Antonelli's career was divided between soap operas, miniseries and films. Avassaladoras (2002) was her first film playing a protagonist. In 2003, Giovanna starred in the miniseries A Casa das Sete Mulheres, by Maria Adelaide Amaral and Walter Negrão, playing Anita Garibaldi. At that time, she received several accolades for her resourcefulness, originality and the way in which she disengaged herself from the brand of her previous character Jade who had launched her to stardom in Brazil. She played the Virgin Mary in the film Maria, Mãe do Filho de Deus,(2003) directed by Moacyr Góes and in the theater appeared in A Paixão de Cristo. Her performance in the film was praised by some critics but criticized by others who thought that her performance lacked brilliance.

In 2004, she portrayed her first villain, Barbara, in the telenovela Da Cor do Pecado (2004), by João Emanuel Carneiro. She received critical acclaim for acting in a way that erased viewers' memories of the characters with a reputation for being a good girl who had played previously. In the theater she appeared with actor Murilo Benício in Dois na Gangorra, directed by Walter Lima Júnior, and in film in the movie A Cartomante, directed by Wagner de Assis and Pablo Uranga.

In 2005-2006, after the great success of the soap operas O Clone and Da Cor do Pecado, she was invited again by Glória Perez and João Emanuel Carneiro to play the main protagonist of the soap operas América and Cobras & Lagartos, but she refused the invitations for different reasons and she was replaced by Deborah Secco and Mariana Ximenes.

=== 2007–2010: Sete Pecados, Três Irmãs and Viver a Vida ===
In 2007, Antonelli returned to TV as Delzuite, the protagonist of the first part of the miniseries, Amazônia, de Galvez a Chico Mendes, by Glória Perez. In the same year, he was the protagonist in the telenovela Sete Pecados (2007) by Walcyr Carrasco, where her character Clarice lives a love triangle with Dante (Reynaldo Gianecchini) and Beatriz Priscila Fantin). She also appeared in the long film Caixa Dois, directed by Bruno Barreto, in the role of a secretary to a powerful banker.. Her performance was criticized and her role considered "the weak point of the plot". In 2008, she was invited to play the protagonist Joana in the soap opera Beleza Pura by Andréa Maltarolli but she declined the invitation and was replaced by Regiane Alves. Giovanna showed her comic side, interpreting the clumsy Alma Jequitibá, one of the protagonists in the telenovela Três Irmãs, by Antonio Calmon. A physician Obstetrician & gynecologist, Alma is divided between two loves: the character of Bruno Garcia and the character of Rodrigo Hilbert. She gained prominence as Dora in Viver a Vida (2009). In the movies, she filmed The Heartbreaker, a co-production between Brazil and the United States, directed by Roberto Carminati. The film was shot in Florianópolis, Santa Catarina and Boston, and was released two years after its completion, on February 14, 2012.

In 2009, Antonelli returned to theaters, in the film Budapest, directed by Walter Carvalho, based on the book by Chico Buarque. In the film, Antonelli appears naked for the first time in the movies as an egocentric television news anchor.

Still in 2009, she played the role of Dora in the telenovela Viver a Vida by Manoel Carlos marking her return after almost 10 years. In the plot, Antonelli plays Dora, a humble girl who goes to Búzios to fine a new life and escape her ex-husband who is a bandit and the father of her daughter, Rafaela (Klara Castanho). There she meets Marcos (José Mayer), with whom she begins a romance, and meets the Argentine Maradona (Mario José Paz). In the course of the plot, Dora becomes pregnant and does not know which man is the father. Her role was well received by critics. Also in 2010, the actress played Chico Xavier's stepdaughter in the adaptation of the work by Chico Xavier, in the film of the same name.

=== 2011–2014: Aquele Beijo, Salve Jorge and Em Família ===
In 2011, Antonelli joined the cast of the telenovela Aquele Beijo, by Miguel Falabella, playing the character Cláudia, the protagonist of the plot. Claudia is betrayed by her boyfriend, Rubinho ( Victor Pecoraro ), with the daughter of the maid of his house. She travels to Cartagena, Colombia, to work and at the airport meets Vicente (Ricardo Pereira), a state prosecutor, who is going to the same place to end the engagement of his beloved. The two become great friends and end up falling in love. For her character, Antonelli won the award for Best Actress in the Contigo Award. The following year was the protagonist in the episode "A Venenosa de Sampa", in the series As Brasileiras by Daniel Filho. In the episode, she plays a socialite who does everything to prevent her rival having a dress equal to hers at a party.

In 2012, she played one of the protagonists of the telenovela Salve Jorge, by Glória Perez, and emerged as the delegate of Heloísa . The character was popular with the public, mainly for her style, clothes and accessories which were most desired by women.

In 2014, she was one of the protagonists of the telenovela Em Família produced by Manoel Carlos. She played her first lesbian character, Carla, married to Cadu (Reynaldo Gianecchini). She leaves her husband to live with the photographer Marina played by (Tainá Müller). Still in 2014, Antonelli starred as Adriana in the long-running S.O.S. Mulheres ao Mar, a romantic comedy. Her character was well received by critics and the film became a blockbuster, with a sequel confirmed for 2015.

=== 2015–present: A Regra do Jogo, Sol Nascente and Segundo Sol ===
In 2015 she was invited to participate in the telenovela by João Emanuel Carneiro, A Regra do Jogo, in the role of the villain Athena Terremolinos. Her character was the highlight of the program.

In 2016, Antonelli appeared in the new telenovela for The 9 from Walther Negrão and Suzana Pires, Sol Nascente interpreting the protagonist Alice Tanaka, daughter of Kazuo Tanaka (Luis Mello) romantically involved with Mario (Bruno Gagliasso) and César (Rafael Cardoso).

In 2017, she is to be the protagonist of the future telenovela from the 9, Segundo Sol, by João Emanuel Carneiro.

In 2018, she returned to prime time as the protagonist Luzia in Segundo Sol, by João Emanuel Carneiro, a humble and hard-working woman who, after suffering a major blow and being wronged, has to leave her life behind, but returns years later in order to rebuild and get her life back. In 2021, Giovanna is one of the four protagonists of Quanto Mais Vida, Melhor!. In the plot, she plays Paula Terrare, a self-centered and widowed woman, owner of Cosméticos Terrare, who struggles to keep the company afloat. She also suffers from competition from Carmem (Júlia Lemmertz), owner of Wollinger, a cosmetics company, who gradually takes the spotlight away from her. Paula unexpectedly suffers an accident that takes her life, but is given a new chance by Death.

Ten years after the partnership in Salve Jorge, the author Glória Perez invites Alexandre Nero and Giovanna Antonelli to revive the couple Helô and Stênio in her new work in the nine o'clock slot, Travessia, scheduled for the second half of 2022. Once again they were highlighted and stole the spotlight.

== Personal life ==
Antonelli is the daughter of Hilton Prado and Suely Antonelli. Her brother is a lawyer named Leonardo Pietro Antonelli. She has a nephew named Gabriel and a niece named Mina. Her first romance was between ages 16 to 21. She then began to date the businessman Ricardo Medina, and on 8 March 2000, their marriage took place. In February 2002, they divorced

She is a cousin of actors Andre Di Mauro and Claudia Mauro and is related to filmmaker Humberto Mauro.

When participating in the telenovela O Clone, she fell in love with actor Murilo Benício. They started a relationship in 2002 and on 24 May 2005, Antonelli's first child, and Murilo's second, Pietro was born. In November of the same year, the couple separated. Earlier, in April 2004, during their first separation, she was briefly involved with businessman Alexandre Accioly.

In 2005, she met American businessman Robert LoCascio and they became engaged in Italy. The engagement lasted only four months.

In 2009, she ended a two-year relationship with businessman Arthur Fernandes. She then began to date director Leonardo Nogueira, on 8 October 2010, and gave birth to the twins Antonia and Sophia.

== Filmography ==
=== Film ===
| Year | Title | Role | Notes |
|---|---|---|---|
| 2000 | Bossa Nova | Sharon | |
| 2002 | Avassaladoras | Laura de Felipes Palácios | Miami Brazilian Film Festival Award for Best Actress |
| 2003 | Maria, Mãe do Filho de Deus | Maria Auxiliadora | INTE Award for Actress of the Year |
| 2003 | Sinbad: Legend of the Seven Seas | Marina | Dubbing |
| 2004 | A Cartomante | Karen Albuquerque | |
| 2007 | Caixa Dois | Ângela Barbosa dos Santos | |
| 2007 | Por Amor | —N/a | |
| 2009 | Budapeste | Vanda Costa | Nominated—Contigo Cinema Award for Best Supporting Actress |
| 2009 | The Heartbreaker | Anna | |
| 2010 | Chico Xavier | Cidália Xavier | |
| 2014 | S.O.S. Mulheres ao Mar | Adriana | |
| 2015 | S.O.S. Mulheres ao Mar 2 | Adriana | |
| 2017 | The Boss Baby | Janice | Dubbing |
| 2023 | Elemental | Brook Ripple | Dubbing |

=== Television ===
| Year | Title | Role | Notes |
|---|---|---|---|
| 1994 | Tropicaliente | Benvinda | |
| 1995 | Tocaia Grande | Ressu | |
| 1996 | Xica da Silva | Elvira | |
| 1998 | Corpo Dourado | Judy | |
| 1998 | Você Decide | Herself | 1 episode |
| 1999 | Força de um Desejo | Violeta | |
| 1999 | Você Decide | Herself | 2 episodes |
| 1999–2000 | Malhação | Isa Pasqualete | |
| 2000 | Laços de Família | Capitu | Press Award for Best New Actress; Qualidade Award for Best New Actress; TV Press Award for Best Actress |
| 2001 | O Clone | Jade Rachid | Contigo Award for Best Romantic Couple (with Murilo Benício); INTE Award for Best Actress; Qualidade Award for Best Television Actress; Nominated—Contigo Award for Best Actress |
| 2003 | A Casa das Sete Mulheres | Anita Garibaldi | TV Mini Series; Nominated—Contigo Award for Best Actress |
| 2004 | Da Cor do Pecado | Bárbara Campos Sodré | Nominated—Contigo Award for Best Actress |
| 2006 | Minha Nada Mole Vida | Bia Lopes | 1 episode |
| 2007 | Amazônia, de Galvez a Chico Mendes | Delzuite Gonçalves | TV Mini Series |
| 2007 | Sete Pecados | Clarice Florentino Ferraz | |
| 2007 | Por Acaso | Herself | Cameo appearance |
| 2008 | Casos e Acasos | Jamille | 1 episode |
| 2008 | Três Irmãs | Alma Jequitibá de Matos | Nominated—Contigo Award for Best Actress |
| 2009 | Viver a Vida | Dora Regina Vitória Vilela | |
| 2011 | Aquele Beijo | Cláudia Collaboro | |
| 2012 | As Brasileiras | Gigi | 1 episode |
| 2012 | Salve Jorge | Heloísa Sampaio | |
| 2014 | Em Família | Clara Fernandes | |
| 2015 | A Regra do Jogo | Atena Torremolinos / Francineide | Melhores do Ano of Best Actress of Telenovela |
| 2016 | Sol Nascente | Alice Tanaka | |
| 2017 | Cidade Proibida | Paula | |
| 2018 | Segundo Sol | Luzia Batista / Ariella Arlesisla | Melhores do Ano of Best Actress of Telenovela |
| 2021 | Filhas de Eva | Lívia Fantini Caldas | |
| 2021 | Quanto Mais Vida, Melhor! | Paula Terrare | |
| 2022 | Travessia | Heloísa "Helô" Sampaio Viana | |
| 2025 | Beleza Fatal | Elvira Paixão | |

== Theater ==
| Title | Year | Role | Notes |
|---|---|---|---|
| Jesus Christ Superstar | 2001 | Mary Magdalene | |
| The Passion of the Christ | 2003 | Virgin Mary | A Paixão de Cristo |
| Two for the Seesaw | 2004 | Gittel | Dois na Gangorra |

== Awards and nominations ==
| Year | Award | Category | Work | Result |
|---|---|---|---|---|
| 2000 | Prêmio Extra de Televisão | Best Actress | Laços de Família | Won |
| 2000 | Prêmio Qualidade Brasil | Best Actress Breakthrough | Laços de Família | Won |
| 2000 | Prêmio TV Press | Best Actress | Laços de Família | Won |
| 2000 | Melhores do Ano | Best Supporting Actress | Laços de Família | Won |
| 2001 | Troféu Imprensa de 2001 | Revelation of the Year | Laços de Família | Won |
| 2001 | Meus Prêmios Nick | Favorite actress | O Clone | Won |
| 2001 | Prêmio Qualidade Brasil RJ | Best actress | O Clone | Won |
| 2002 | Prêmio Contigo! de TV de 2002 | Best Actress | O Clone | Nominated |
| 2002 | Prêmio Contigo! de TV de 2002 | Best Romantic Couple(with Murilo Benício) | O Clone | Won |
| 2002 | Troféu Imprensa de 2002 | Best actress | O Clone | Nominated |
| 2002 | Melhores do Ano de 2002 | Best actress | O Clone | Won |
| 2002 | Prêmio Extra de Televisão | Best actress | O Clone | Nominated |
| 2002 | Troféu Internet de 2002 | Best actress | O Clone | Won |
| 2002 | Brazilian Film Festival of Miami | Best actress | Avassaladoras | Won |
| 2004 | Prêmio Contigo! de TV | Best actress | A Casa das Sete Mulheres | Nominated |
| 2004 | Prêmio Extra de Televisão | Best actress | Da Cor do Pecado | Nominated |
| 2005 | Prêmio Contigo! de TV | Best actress | Da Cor do Pecado | Nominated |
| 2009 | Prêmio Contigo! de TV | Best actress | Três Irmãs | Nominated |
| 2010 | Prêmio Extra de Televisão | Best Supporting Actress | Viver a Vida | Won |
| 2013 | Meus Prêmios Nick 2013 | Favorite actress | Salve Jorge | Won |
| 2013 | Meus Prêmios Nick 2013 | Favorite character | Salve Jorge | Nominated |
| 2013 | Prêmio Quem de Televisão | Best Actress | Salve Jorge | Won |
| 2013 | Prêmio Extra de Televisão de 2013 | Best Actress | Salve Jorge | Won |
| 2013 | Prêmio Contigo! de TV de 2013 | Best Novel Actress | Salve Jorge | Won |
| 2014 | Troféu Imprensa de 2014 | Best Actress | Salve Jorge | Nominated |
| 2014 | Troféu Internet de 2014 | Best Actress | Salve Jorge | Won |
| 2014 | Prêmio Extra de Televisão | Melhor Atriz Coadjuvante | Em Família | Won |
| 2014 | Prêmio Contigo! de TV | Prêmio Contigo! de TV de melhor atriz coadjuvante | Em Família | Nominated |
| 2015 | Troféu Internet de 2015 | Melhor Atriz | Em Família | Nominated |
| 2015 | Prêmio Quem de Televisão | Best Actress | A Regra do Jogo | Won |
| 2015 | Melhores do Ano de 2015 | Best Novel Actress | A Regra do Jogo | Won |
| 2015 | Prêmio Extra de Televisão | Best actress | A Regra do Jogo | Nominated |
| 2016 | Troféu Internet de 2016 | Best Actress | A Regra do Jogo | Nominated |
| 2016 | Troféu Imprensa de 2016 | Best Actress | A Regra do Jogo | Nominated |
