= O Clone =

Brazilian telenovela

- Also known as: The Clone
- Genre: Telenovela; Romantic drama; Science fiction
- Created by: Glória Perez
- Written by: Glória Perez
- Directed by: Teresa Lampreia; Marcelo Travesso; Mário Márcio Bandarra; Marcos Schechtman; Jayme Monjardim
- Starring: Giovanna Antonelli; Murilo Benício; Juca de Oliveira; Stênio Garcia; Reginaldo Faria; Vera Fischer; Dalton Vigh; Daniela Escobar; Adriana Lessa; Jandira Martini; Antônio Calloni; Letícia Sabatella; Eliane Giardini; Nívea Maria; Débora Falabella
- Opening theme: "Sob o Sol" by Sagrado Coração da Terra
- Composer: Marcus Viana
- Country of origin: Brazil
- Original languages: Portuguese; Arabic
- No. of seasons: 1
- No. of episodes: 221

Production
- Production locations: Rio de Janeiro; Morocco
- Camera setup: Multi-camera
- Running time: 30–74 minutes

Original release
- Network: Rede Globo
- Release: 1 October 2001 – 14 June 2002

Related
- El clon (2010)

O Clone (English: The Clone) is a Brazilian telenovela created by Glória Perez and directed by Jayme Monjardim. Produced and aired by Rede Globo, it was aired from 1 October 2001 to 13 June 2002, with 221 episodes. It also was an international success, selling in 93 countries.

== Plot ==
In the early 1980s, Rio de Janeiro, Brazil; Jade (Giovanna Antonelli), a young Muslim girl, is orphaned when her mother dies and has to go to Morocco where her uncle Alí lives. The problem is that Jade was living in a country with a culture very different from that of an Islamic country. Thus, once she arrives in Morocco, she must learn new traditions and customs, adjust to her new way of living, and face all the punishments she will be exposed to because of her conflicting personality and actions that go against her religion.

Back in Rio, a well-off family, the Ferraz, go to vacation in Morocco. Twin brothers Lucas and Diogo Ferraz (Murilo Benício), along with Leônidas (Reginaldo Faria), their father, and doctor and geneticist Augusto Albieri (Juca de Oliveira), a friend of the family and godfather to the twins, visit Alí, a friend of Albieri's. There, Lucas and Jade meet, and they fall in love at first sight. Jade, knowing it's haraam (a sin) to love Lucas, decides to forgo her religious mandates for the sake of love, which prohibit her from marrying a non-Muslim person. Meanwhile, in Rio, Diogo tragically dies in a helicopter crash. Both Lucas and Leônidas are devastated by the news, and thus Lucas's plans of running away with Jade are subsequently ruined. Albieri is shattered and becomes deeply despondent. He never recovered fully from the death of his fiancée, and Diogo's death renews his distress.

In an effort to change the natural course of events, in his despair Albieri resolves to utilize Lucas's cells in order to make the first human clone. Deusa (lit. "goddess) (Adriana Lessa), a low-middle class woman unable to get pregnant who has been receiving pro bono fertility treatment from Albieri, is unknowingly inseminated with Lucas's cloned cells and, as a result, gives birth to a boy she does not know is a clone, Léo. He is born without complications, but Albieri wants to stay close to him and watch him grow up. Léo gradually becomes very attached to Albieri, making Deusa uneasy.

Several years pass since Léo's birth. Now, Jade is married to Saíd (Dalton Vigh) and she's a mother of a little child, Khadija (Carla Diaz). She lives happily with her new family in Morocco and is beginning to love Saíd. However, due to Said's insecurities, a new encounter with Lucas is forced upon Jade to test her love for him. With this encounter, the old passion revives, but they're not the young lovers they once were and now they have new lives and new responsibilities. Lucas, who is married to Maysa (Daniela Escobar) with whom he has a daughter, Mel (Débora Falabella), doesn't know he was cloned 20 years previously. Albieri kept this a secret and has maintained efforts to keep Léo and Lucas from ever meeting and thereby finding out the truth. The last Albieri knew of Léo, he and Deusa had gone to the north of Brazil, but, when they return to Rio, Léo is now a handsome young man, and the living image of the young Lucas whom Jade met in Morocco. The arrival of Leo in Brazil and his later travels to Morocco will change the life of all the characters forever.

== Syndication ==
O Clone aired in Brazil comprising 221 episodes, of variable duration. However, when syndicated and sold to other countries the telenovela got the number of episodes enlarged to 250 and the duration fixed at 45 minutes. O Clone was a big hit, being aired in several countries all around the world. It was dubbed in several languages, with the Spanish version airing in the United States by Telemundo. There are also a few differences between the Brazilian soundtrack version and the syndicated one: some music was changed in order to make the people feel more identified; for example, many Portuguese songs were changed to Hispanic American music for the sake of the Hispanic community in the United States. The syndicated opening credits feature the same visuals as the original Brazilian run, but while the Brazilian opening includes the song "Sob o Sol" by Sagrado Coração da Terra, the syndicated opening has "Maktub" by Marcus Viana.

== Cast ==
Actor	Character
Murilo Benício	Lucas Ferraz
Murilo Benício	Diogo Ferraz
Murilo Benício	Edvaldo Leandro Moura da Silva (Léo)
Giovanna Antonelli	Jade Rachid
Vera Fischer	Yvete Simas Ferraz
Reginaldo Faria	Leônidas Ferraz (Leãozinho)
Juca de Oliveira	Augusto Albieri
Adriana Lessa	Deusa da Silva
Dalton Vigh	Said Rachid
Daniela Escobar	Maysa Ferraz
Stênio Garcia	Ali El Adib
Jandira Martini	Zoraide
Letícia Sabatella	Latiffa El Adib Rachid
Antônio Calloni	Mohamed Rachid
Eliane Giardini	Nazira Rachid
Nívea Maria	Edna Albieri
Cristiana Oliveira	Alice Maria Ferreira das Neves (Alicinha)
Débora Falabella/Cynthia Falabella	Melissa Ferraz (Mel)
Marcello Novaes	Alexandre Cordeiro (Xande)
Solange Couto	Jurema Cordeiro (Dona Jura)
Osmar Prado	Lobato
Cissa Guimarães	Clarisse
Marcos Frota	Escobar
Neusa Borges	Dalva
Ruth de Souza	Dona Mocinha da Silva
Victor Fasano	Otávio Valverde (Tavinho)
Beth Goulart	Lidiane Valverde
Luciano Szafir	Zein
Nívea Stelmann	Ranya Rachid
Thiago Fragoso	Nando Escobar
Sthefany Brito	Samira El Adib Rachid
Thaís Fersoza	Telma Valverde (Telminha)
Sérgio Marone	Maurício Valverde (Cecéu)
Elizângela	Noêmia
Viviane Victorette	Regina da Costa (Regininha)
Raul Gazolla	Miro
Françoise Forton	Simone
Juliana Paes	Karla
Mara Manzan	Odete
Roberto Bonfim	Edvaldo
Carla Diaz	Khadija Rachid
Perry Salles	Mustafá Rachid
Sebastião Vasconcelos	Tio Abdul Rachid
Thiago Oliveira	Amin El Adib Rachid
Carolina Macieira	Sumaya Rachid
Totia Meireles	Laurinda Albuquerque
Guilherme Karan	Raposão
Eri Johnson	Ligeirinho
Myrian Rios	Anita
Murilo Grossi	Júlio
Thalma de Freitas	Carol
Marcelo Brou	Pitoco
Léa Garcia	Lola da Silva
Francisco Cuoco	Padre Matiolli
Tânia Alves	Norma
Sílvio Guindane	Basílio
Christiana Kalache	Aninha
Maria João Bastos	Amália
Jayme Periard	Rogê
Antônio Pitanga	Tião
Ingra Liberato	Amina
Michelle Franco	Michelle
Milena Paula	Milena
Eduardo Martini	Cotia
Eduardo Canuto	Gasolina
Luá Ubacker	Duda
Aimée Ubacker	Aimée
Andressa Koetz	Soninha

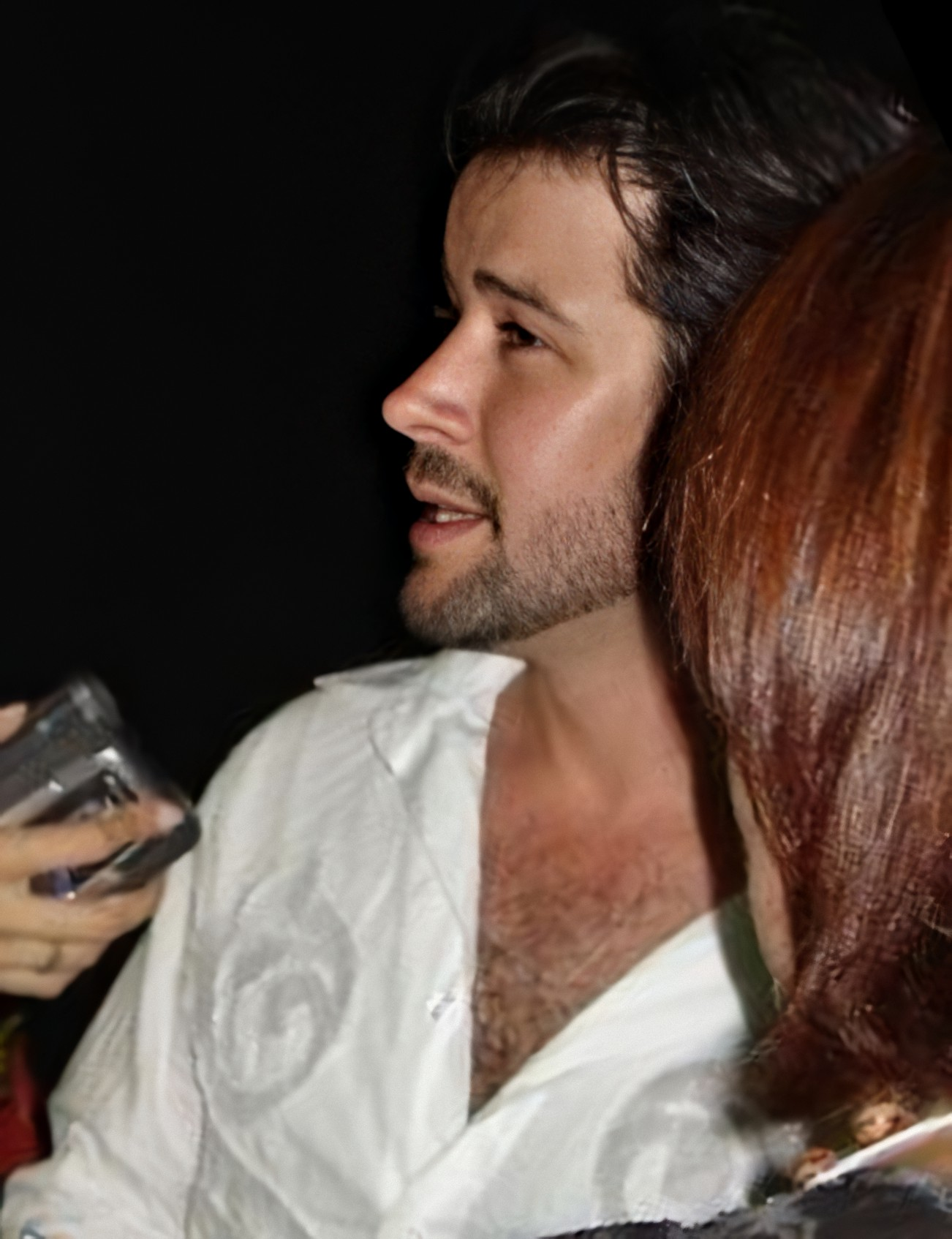
Murilo Benício as Lucas, Diogo and the clone Léo.

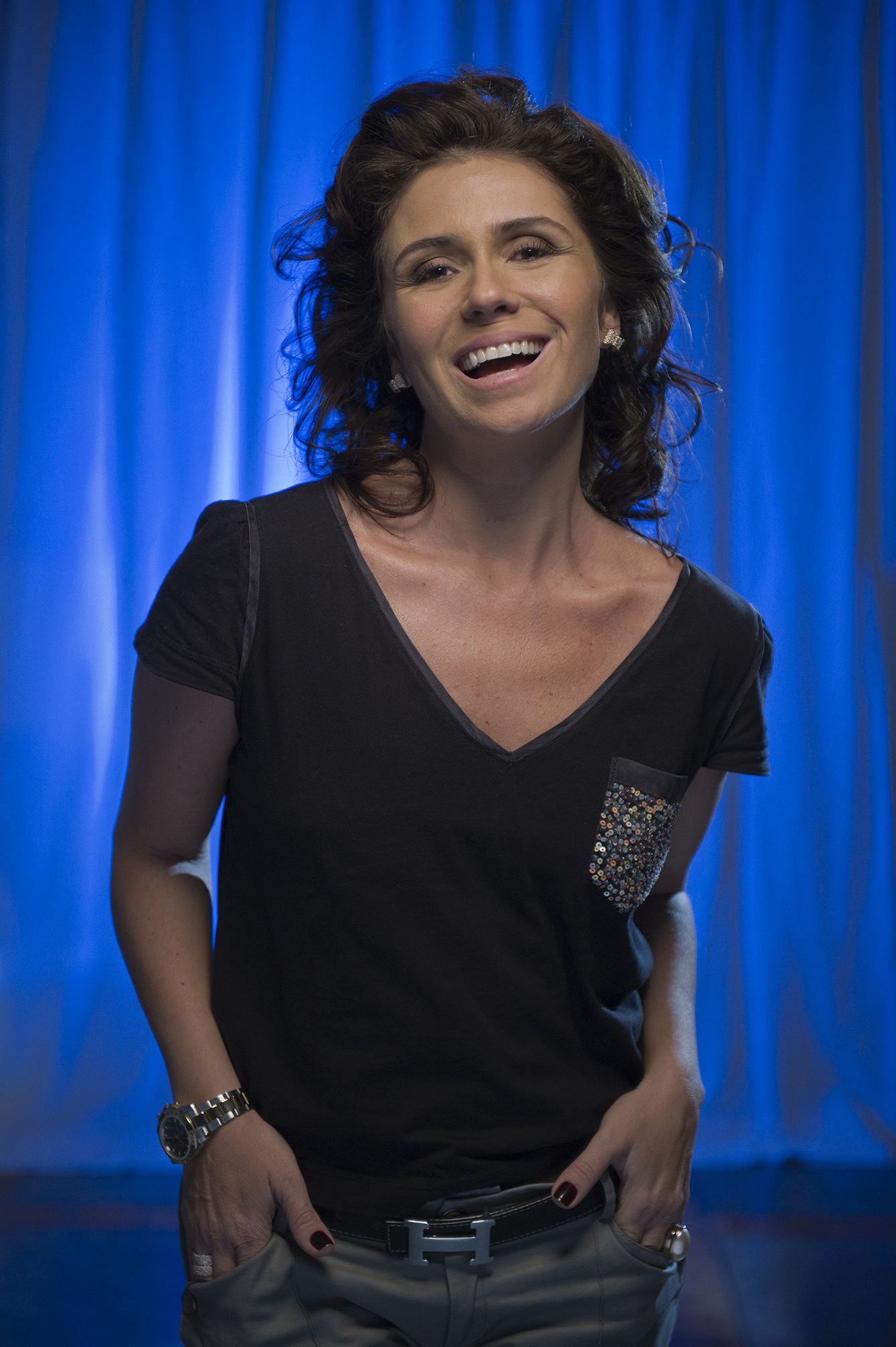
Giovanna Antonelli as Jade Rachid.

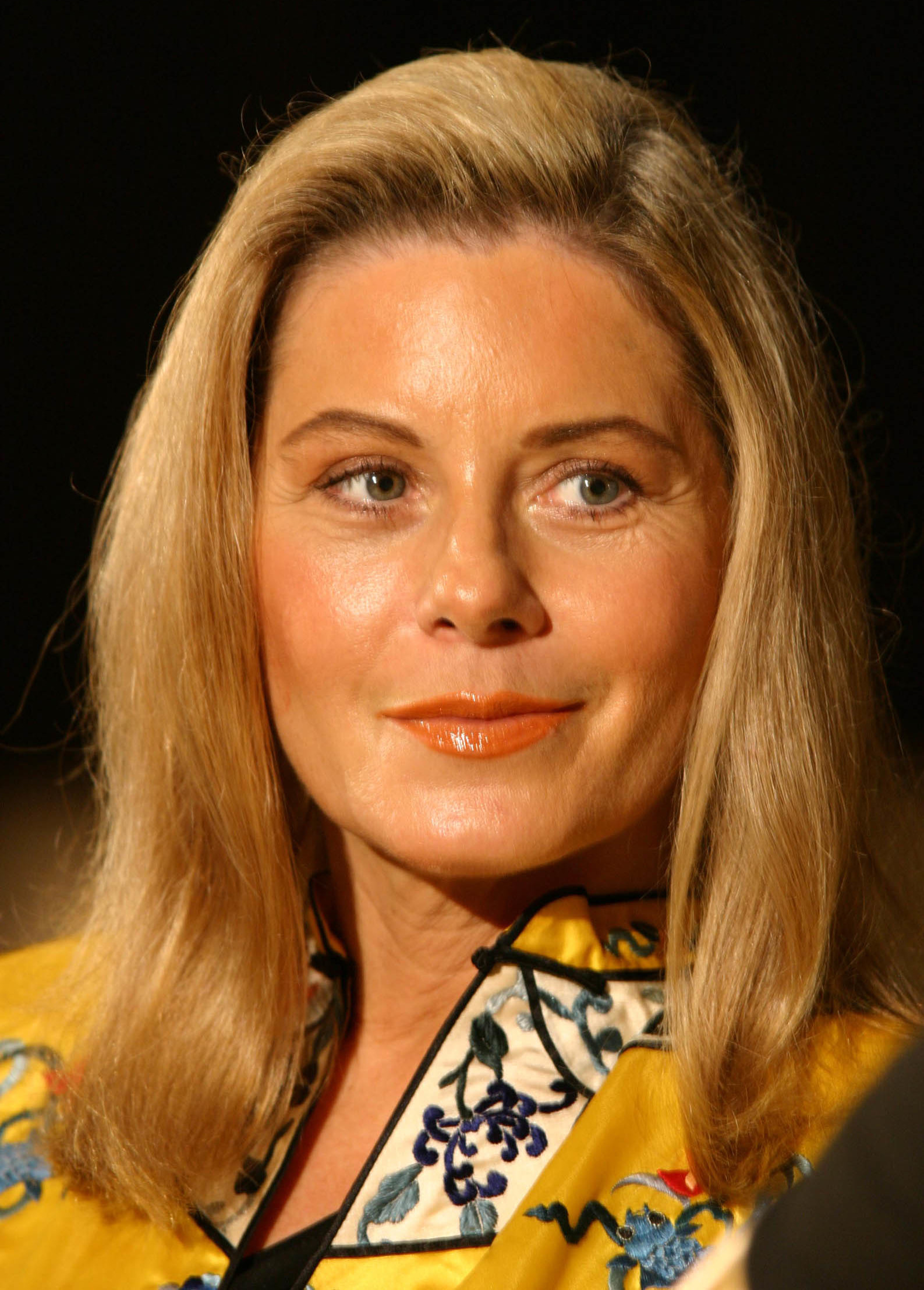
Vera Fischer as Yvete.

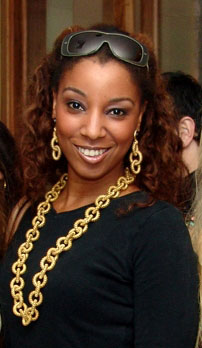
Adriana Lessa as Deusa.

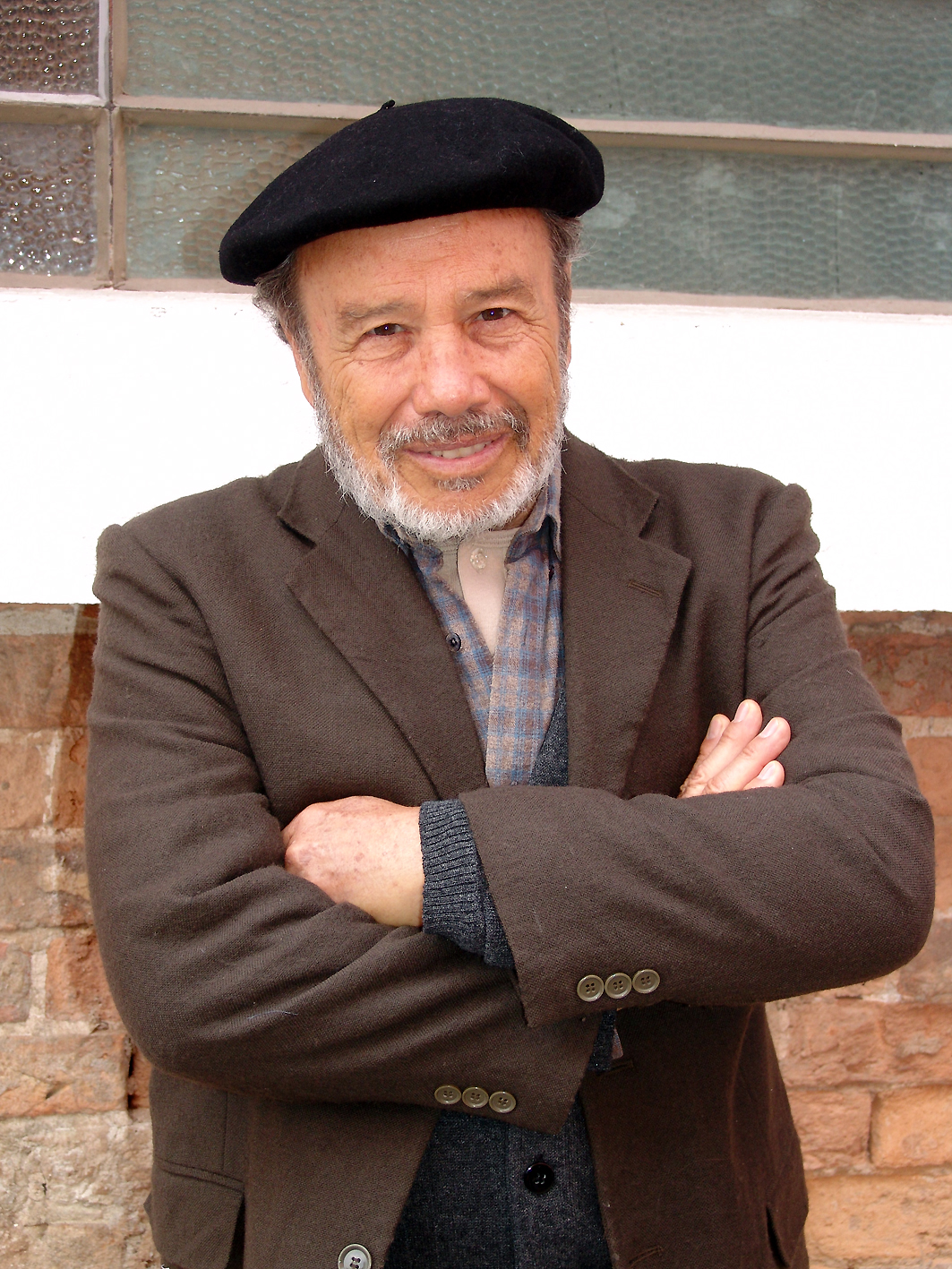
Stênio Garcia as Ali.

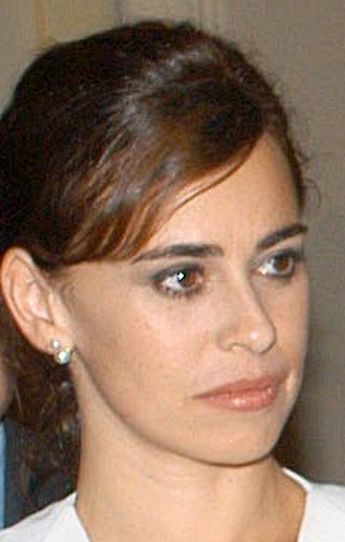
Daniela Escobar as Maysa.

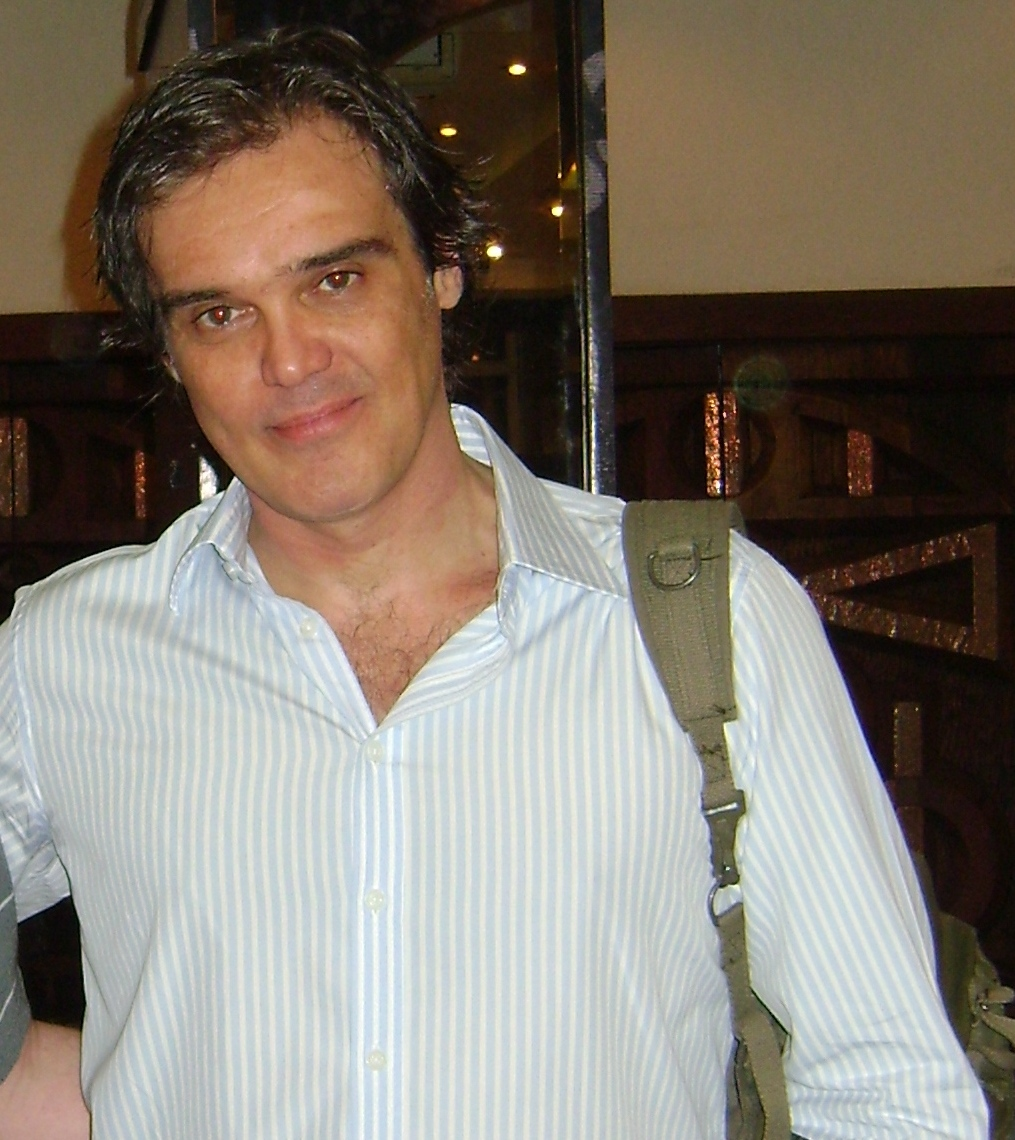
Dalton Vigh as Said.

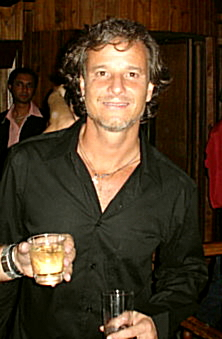
Marcello Novaes as Xande.

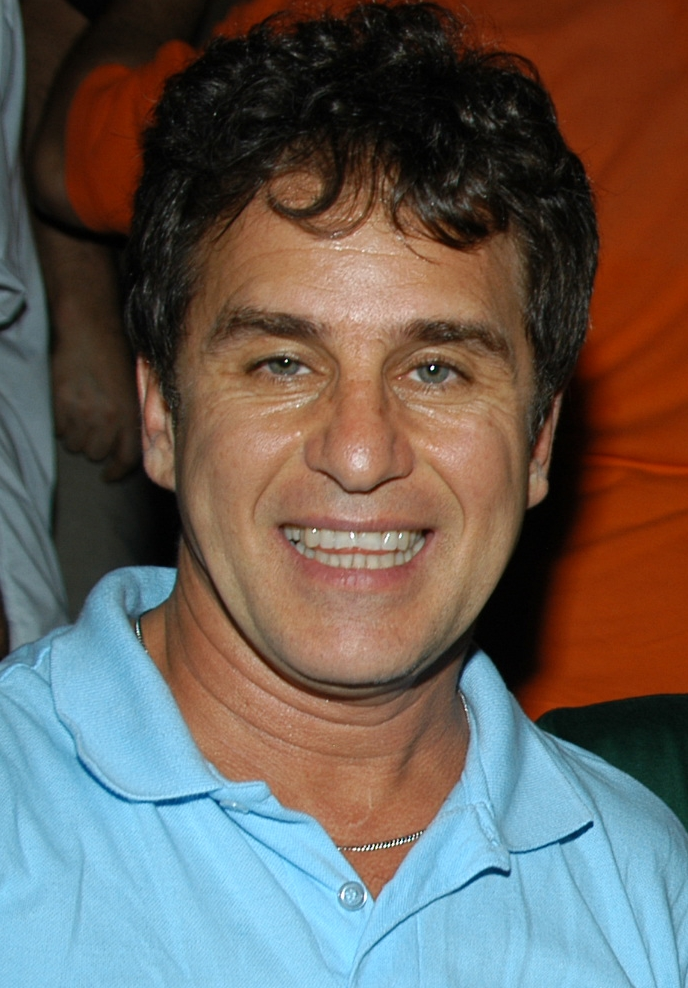
Marcos Frota as Escobar.

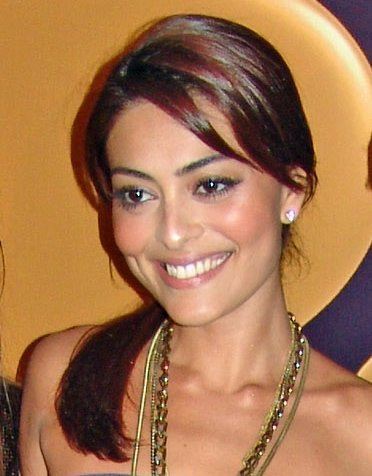
Juliana Paes as Karla.

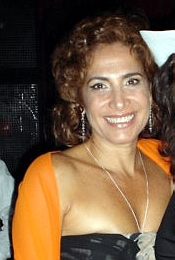
Totia Meireles as Laurinda.

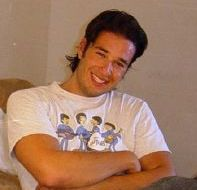
Sérgio Marone as Cecéu.

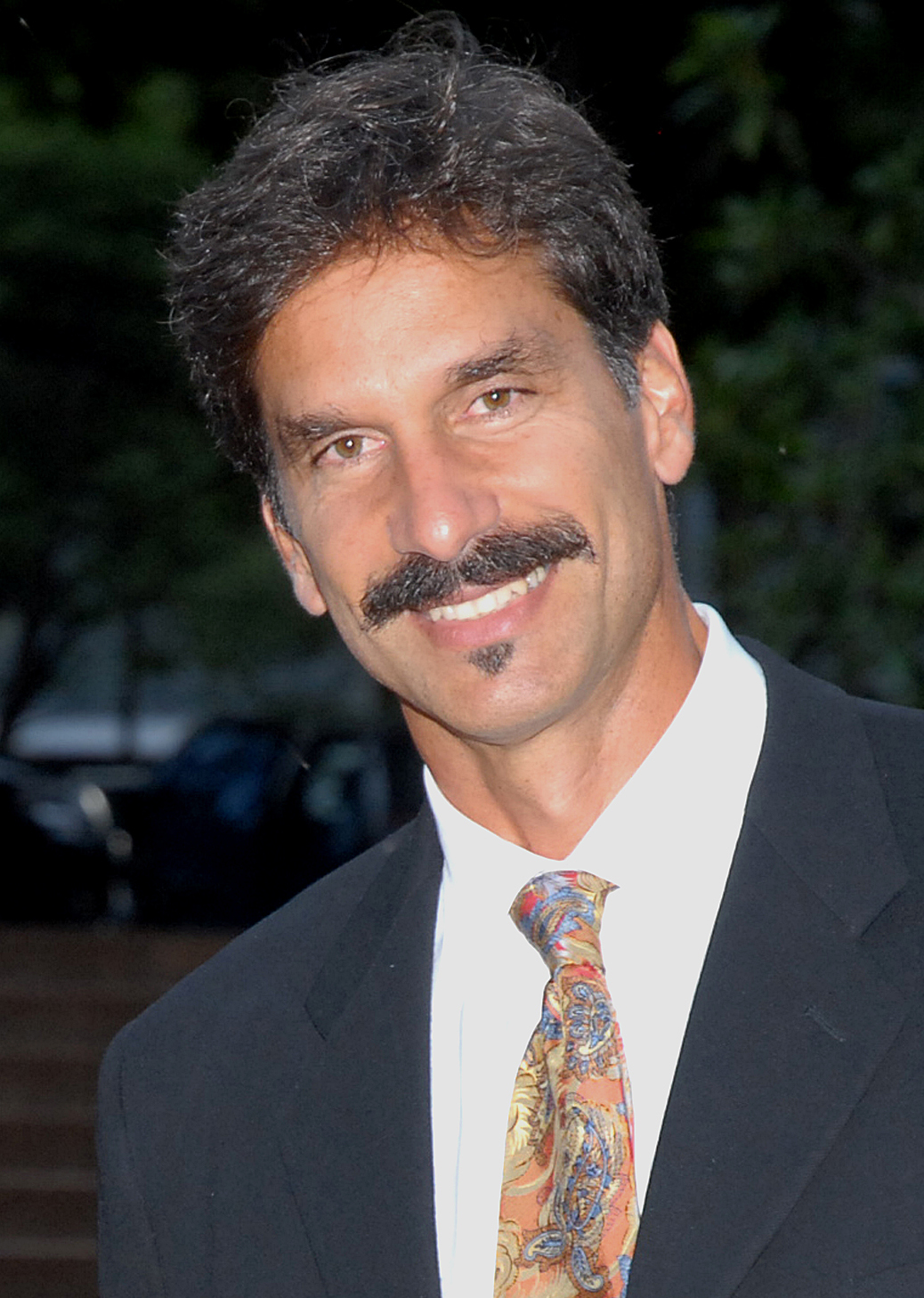
Victor Fasano as Tavinho.

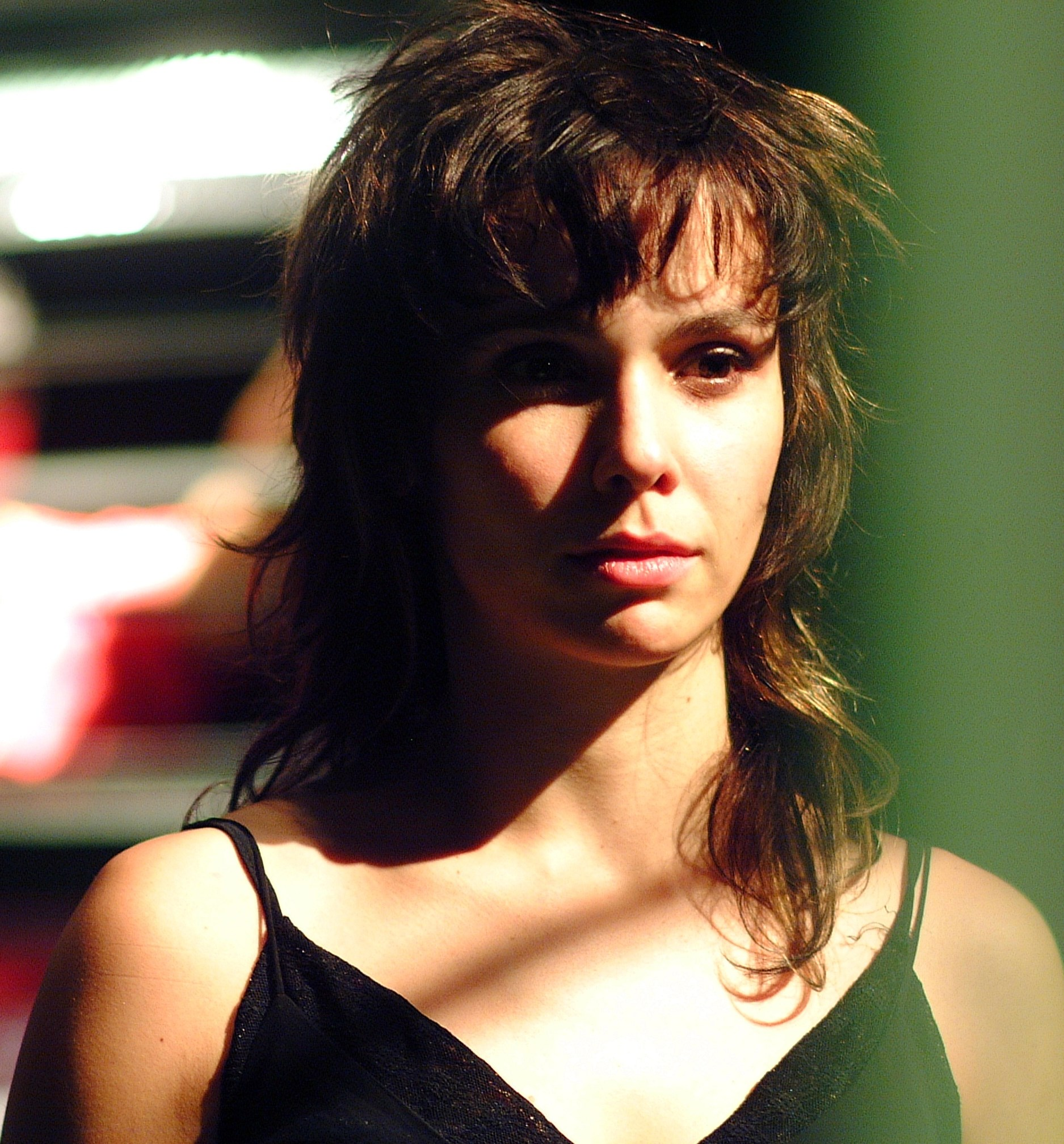
Débora Falabella as Mel Ferraz.

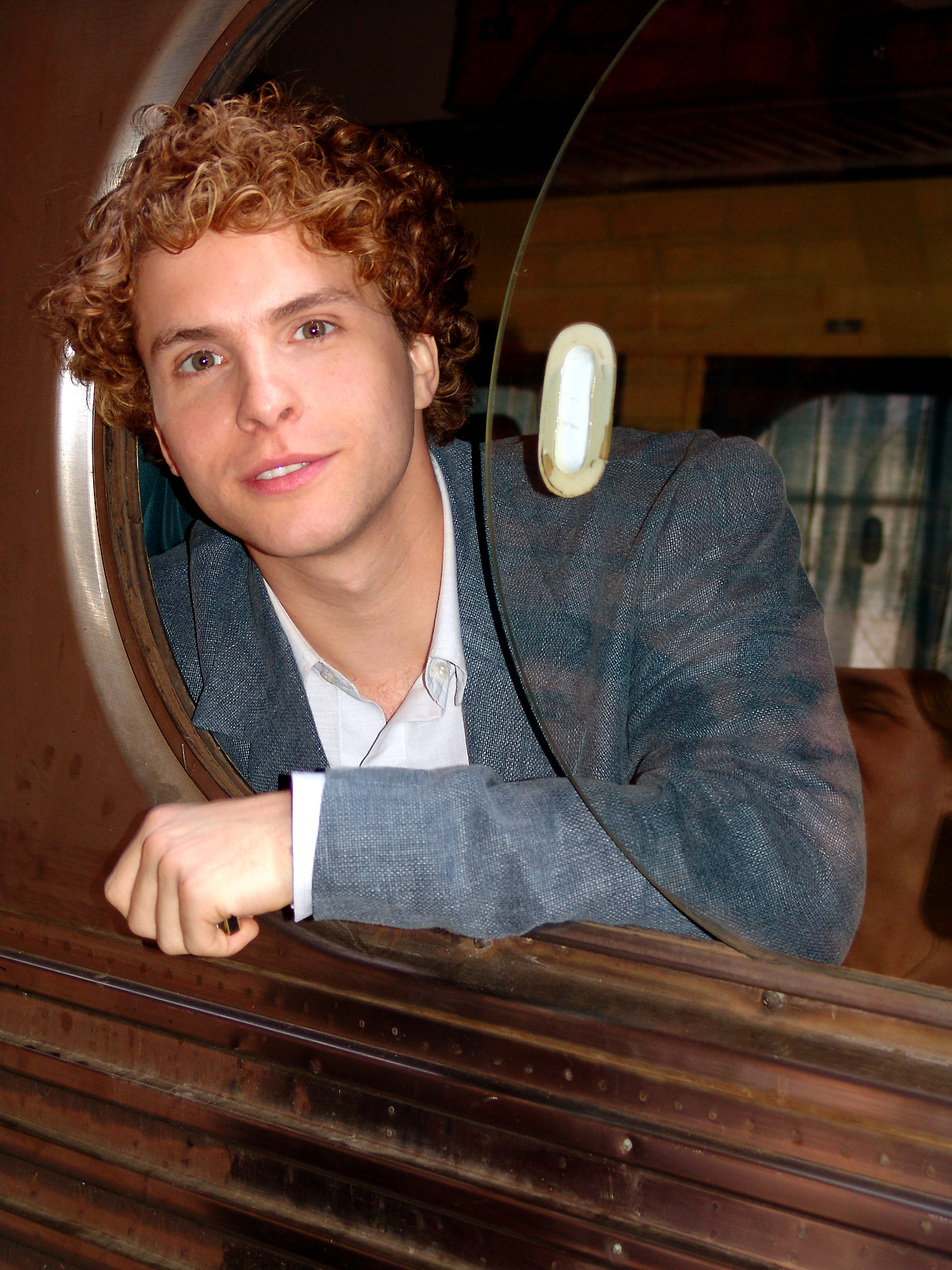
Thiago Fragoso as Nando.

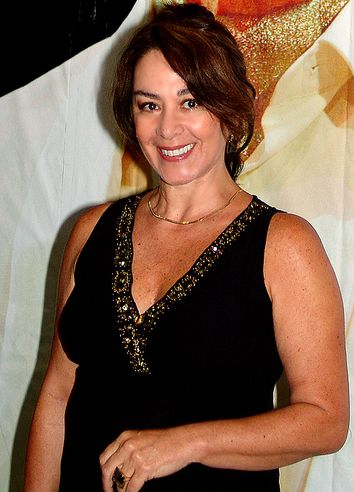
Nívea Maria as Edna.

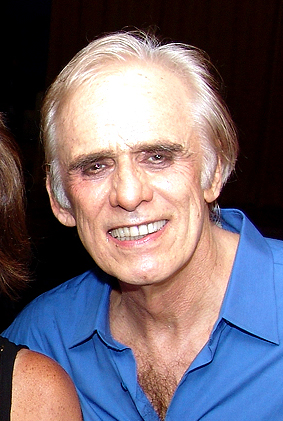
Francisco Cuoco as Padre Matiolli.

== Portrayal of Muslims ==
While the telenovela's attention to issues of drug addiction won its creator an award, the portrayal of Arab-Muslim cultures attracted criticism from Arab-Muslim voices.

The part of the telenovela dealing with Islamic customs and attitudes mixes traditions from diverse countries, rather than those of Morocco alone, and has been criticised for its inaccurate representation of these traditions. These criticisms include the portrayal of polygamy as commonly accepted in Morocco, women rarely working outside the home or pursuing an advanced education, and women having only unimportant roles within the family. Critics making these comments included sheik Abdelmalek Cherkaoui Ghazouani, the Moroccan ambassador to Brazil, who considered the high profile of these representations to merit his posting his criticisms directly on his embassy's website as part of a bulletin board.

== Production ==
=== Casting Selection ===
Originally, Glória Perez wanted Letícia Spiller to play Jade, but the actress declined the offer because she didn't want to leave the stage play “O Falcão e o Imperador”, in which she was also the director.

Ana Paula Arósio was the next option, as the writer had already worked with her in the miniseries “Hilda Furacão”, but she was already booked for “Esperança”.

Giovanna Antonelli was suggested by directors Jayme Monjardim and Marcos Schechtman. She was invited, took all the screen tests, and, in the writer's opinion, Giovanna was perfect for the role of Jade because she showed great talent during the audition and fit the role perfectly—more than any other actress who tested for it. As a result, the leading role went to Giovanna.

Fábio Assunção was invited to play Lucas, but he declined, finding the story too confusing. Murilo Benício read the synopsis, became interested in the project, and landed the role.

Eduardo Moscovis was invited to play Said, but he turned it down due to exhaustion after spending a year filming “O Cravo e a Rosa”. The role then went to Dalton Vigh, who had stood out as a leading actor on RecordTV and SBT.

At first, Reginaldo Fariaturned down the role of Leônidas because he was performing in theater. Raul Cortez was set to take on the role, but an internal dispute arose between the productions of O Clone and As Filhas da Mãe over the actor, and the latter won. Reginaldo was eventually convinced to balance both projects and accepted the role.

Sílvio de Abreu also managed to pull Thiago Lacerda, who was originally cast as Xande, out of “O Clone” to have him join “As Filhas da Mãe”. The role of Xande then went to Marcello Novaes.

Meanwhile, José Mayer, who had already been cast as Ali, was released by Glória Perez so that Manoel Carlos could have him as the lead in the miniseries “Presença de Anita”. The role of Ali was then given to Stênio Garcia.

Glória Perez wanted Ivete Sangalo to play a police officer who would investigate illegal cloning and become involved with Léo, but the singer didn't want to pause her music career, so the role was ultimately scrapped.

Viviane Victorette won the role of Regininha after winning a new talent contest promoted by the TV show “Caldeirão do Huck”.

About 22 actors joined the storyline only in the third phase, including Cristiana Oliveira, Débora Falabella, Marcello Novaes, Solange Couto, Juliana Paes, Mara Manzan, Cissa Guimarães, and Victor Fasano.

In episode 127, aired on 25 February 2002, actor Luciano Szafir joined the cast to play Zein, an Arab man who had abandoned Islamic customs and ends up marrying Jade.

== Reception ==
=== Ratings ===
Timeslot	# Eps.	Premiere		Finale		Position	TV season	Average viewership
Timeslot	# Eps.	Date	Viewers (in points)	Date	Viewers (in points)	Position	TV season	Average viewership
Monday—Saturday; 20:35	221	1 October 2001	47	14 June 2002	62	#1	2001 - 2002	47

In its premiere, O Clone registered a viewership rating of 47 points, peaking at 53 points.

Its ever lowest recorded data in terms of viewership was on the New Year's Eve of 31 December 2001.

The episode where Lucas and his clone first meet registered 56 points and a 63-point peak, with a 73% audience share.

In its finale, O Clone registered a viewership rating of 62 points peaking at 68 and 77% of audience share.

O Clone registered a mean viewership rating of 47 points.

== Remake ==
In January 2010, a remake in Spanish started to be recorded in Colombia. This remake is a production of TV Globo and Telemundo and it was titled El Clon.
