= Fabíula Nascimento =

Brazilian actress

Fabiula Nascimento
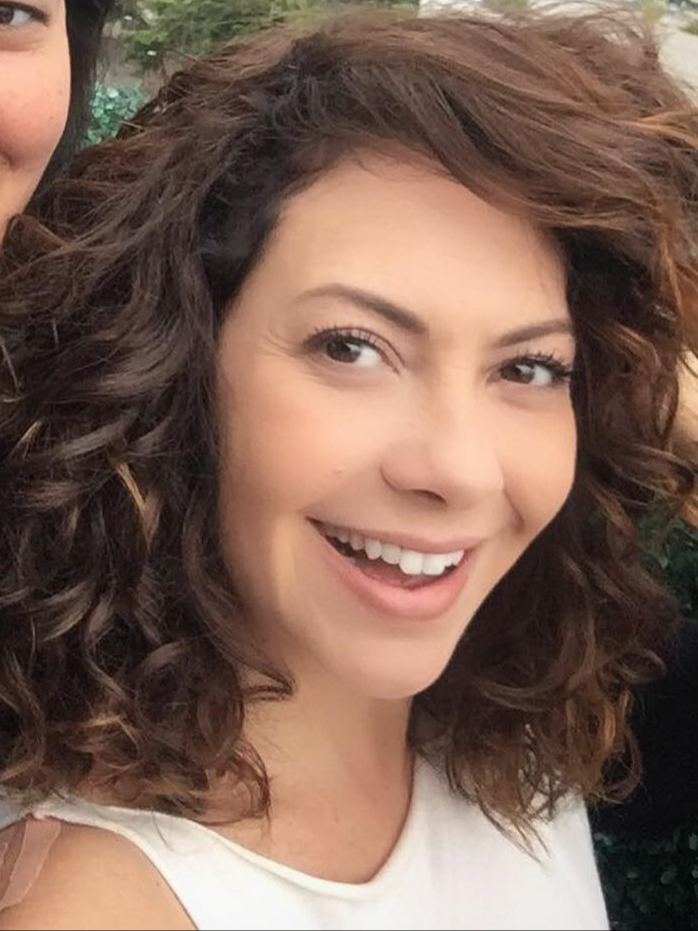
- Nascimento in 2018
- Born: 18 August 1978 (age 47); Curitiba, Paraná, Brazil
- Occupation: Actress
- Years active: 1996–present
- Spouse: Alexandre Nero (m. 2001; div. 2011)

Fabiula Nascimento (born 18 August 1978) is a Brazilian actress. Born in Curitiba, her first major film role was in Estômago, while her most known role came with TV Globo's telenovela Avenida Brasil.

== Filmography ==
=== Television ===
- 2008: Casos e Acasos - Susy/Lúcia
- 2009: A Grande Família - Fátima
- 2009–2011: Força-Tarefa - Jaqueline
- 2011: Tapas & Beijos - Samantha
- 2012: Avenida Brasil - Olenka
- 2013: O Canto da Sereia - Marina de Ogum
- 2013: Joia Rara - Matilde Meyer
- 2014: Boogie Oogie - Cristina
- 2015: I Love Paraisópolis - Paulucha
- 2018: Segundo Sol - Cacau
- 2019: Bom Sucesso - Mariana Prado Monteiro Cabral (Nana)

=== Films ===
- 2005: Sem Ana - Adriana
- 2007: Brichos
- 2007: Estômago - Íria
- 2010: Reflexões de um Liquidificador - Milena
- 2010: Não Se Pode Viver sem Amor - Gilda/Cida
- 2011: Bruna Surfistinha - Janine
- 2011: Amor? - Julia
- 2011: Cilada.com - Suzy
- 2012: Brichos – A Floresta é Nossa
- 2013: A Wolf at the Door
- 2014: The Pilgrim - Lygia Souza
- 2014: S.O.S. Mulheres ao Mar - Luiza
- 2015: S.O.S Mulheres ao Mar 2 - Luiza
- 2018: Morto Não fala - Odete
- 2022: Pluft o Fantasminha - Dona Fantasma
- 2024: O auto da compadecida 2 - Clarabela Catacão
