= S.O.S. Mulheres ao Mar =

2014 film directed by Cris D'Amato

S.O.S Mulheres ao Mar
- Theatrical release poster
- Directed by: Cris D'Amato
- Screenplay by: Sylvio Gonçalves; Rodrigo Nogueira; Marcelo Saback
- Starring: Giovanna Antonelli; Reynaldo Gianecchini; Fabíula Nascimento; Marcelo Airoldi; Thalita Carauta
- Production companies: Globo Filmes; Ananã; Miravista
- Distributed by: Buena Vista International
- Release date: March 20, 2014 (Brazil)
- Country: Brazil
- Language: Portuguese

S.O.S. Mulheres ao Mar is a 2014 Brazilian comedy film directed by Cris D'Amato starring Giovanna Antonelli, Reynaldo Gianecchini, Fabíula Nascimento, Thalita Carauta, Marcelo Airoldi and Emanuelle Araújo.

The film follows the story of Adriana, who, disappointed with the end of her marriage, decides to win back her ex-husband embarking on the same cruise that he is with his new girlfriend, a soap opera star. The film was shot almost entirely on an ocean liner, but also had scenes shot in Venice.

== Plot ==
Adriana (Giovanna Antonelli) embarks on a cruise to Italy, determined to win back her ex-husband Eduardo (Marcelo Airoldi) who is traveling with a new girlfriend, Beatriz (Emanuelle Araújo), a famous TV star. Adriana takes her sister Luiza (Fabíula Nascimento) and the maid Dialinda (Thalita Carauta), encouraged by the book "SOS - Saving a dream", to ruin the trip of her former husband and win him back. However, during the trip, they meet new people and discover new ways and solutions to their lives.

== Cast ==
- Giovanna Antonelli as Adriana
- Fabíula Nascimento as Luiza
- Thalita Carauta as Dialinda
- Reynaldo Gianecchini as André
- Marcello Airoldi as Eduardo
- Emanuelle Araújo as Beatriz
- Theresa Amayo as Sonia
- Sérgio Muniz as Franco
- Carmine Signorelli as Giorgio
- Flávio Galvão as André's father
