= Felipe Roque (actor) =

Brazilian actor and model (born 1987)

- Born: Felipe Roque de Moraes; May 12, 1987 (age 39); Rio de Janeiro, Brazil
- Occupations: Actor; model
- Years active: 2000–present
- Modelling information
- Height: 6 ft 1 in (1.85 m)
- Hair colour: Blonde
- Eye colour: Blue
- Agency: Closer Models (São Paulo); Clarks Models (São Paulo)

Felipe Roque de Moraes (born May 12, 1987) is a Brazilian actor and model.

== Biography ==
Roque began his acting career at age 13. He also began his career as an international model.

He worked on the film S.O.S. Mulheres ao Mar 2, and made his television debut on the telenovela A Regra do Jogo, as Kim. Felipe went through 16 tests until becoming the protagonist of the twenty-fourth season of Malhação, to interpret the character Gabriel, but with the rejection of his character by the public, he became a supporting character in the plot.

== Filmography ==
=== Television ===
Year	Title	Role	Notes
2010	A Moral da História	Prince	1 episode
2012	Aquele Beijo	Per Mokerberg	Special participation
2015	A Regra do Jogo	Kim Stewart Sampaio	
2016	Vai Que Cola		Episode: "As 7 Maravilhas do Subúrbio"
2016–17	Malhação: Pro Dia Nascer Feliz	Gabriel Soares	Season 24
2018	Jesus	Caius	
2021	Gênesis	Ibbi-Sim	
2023	A Divisão	William	
2023	A Infância de Romeu e Julieta	Mauro Ferrari	

=== Film ===
Year	Title	Role
2015	S.O.S. Mulheres ao Mar 2	Maurício
2017	Amor.com	Dinho

=== Internet ===
Year	Title	Role	Notes
2015	Curriculum Vitae	Léo	Webseries

== Stage ==
Year	Title
2015	Crônicas do Amor Mal Amado
2016	Jogo do Amor
