= Alexandre Nero =

Brazilian singer and actor (born 1970)

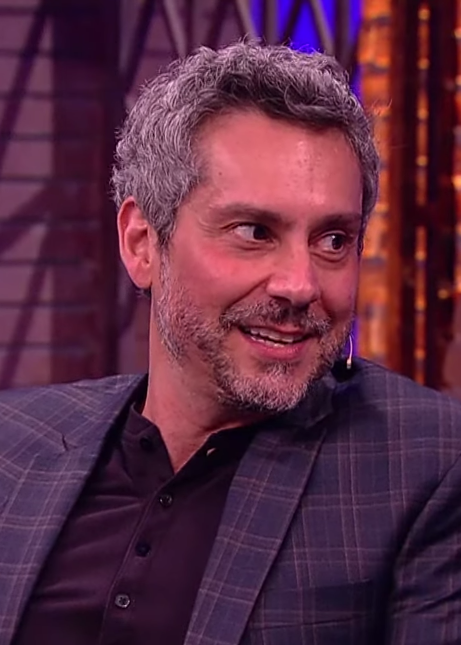
- Nero in 2020
- Born: Alexandre Nero Vieira; 13 February 1970 (age 56); Curitiba, Paraná, Brazil
- Occupations: Actor and singer
- Years active: 1995–present
- Spouses: Fabíula Nascimento (m. 2001; div. 2011) Karen Brusttolin (m. 2015)
- Children: 2

Alexandre Nero Vieira (Portuguese: [alekˈsɐ̃dɾi ˈnɛɾu]; born 13 February 1970) is a Brazilian actor, singer, songwriter, musician, arranger, sound designer and musical director. In 2016, he was nominated for the International Emmy Awards for Best Actor, for his starring role in the telenovela A Regra do Jogo.

== Filmography ==
=== Telenovelas ===
Year	Title	Role
2008	A Favorita	Vanderlei Peive
2009	Paraíso	Terêncio
2010	Escrito nas Estrelas	Gilmar Almeida
2011	Fina Estampa	Baltazar Fonseca
2012	Salve Jorge	Stênio Alencar
2013	Além do Horizonte	Armando Carvalho (Hermes)
2014	Império	Comendador José Alfredo de Medeiros
2015	A Regra do Jogo	Romero Romulo
2018	Onde Nascem os Fortes	Pedro Gouveia
2021	Nos Tempos do Imperador	Antônio Rocha (Tonico)
2022	Travessia	Stênio Alencar
2024	No Rancho Fundo	Eurico "Tico" Leonel Limoeiro
2025	Vale Tudo	Marco Aurélio Cantanhede
2025	Guerreiros do Sol	Miguel Ignácio

=== TV Series ===
Year	Title	Role
2007	Casos e Acasos	Marcos
2009	Dó-Ré-Mi-Fábrica	Lamartine
2010	Batendo Ponto	Caíque
2017–19	Filhos da Pátria	Geraldo Bulhosa

=== Films ===
Year	Title	Role
1998	Rosinha, Minha Sereia	
2003	O Preço da Paz	Alferes Pimentel
2011	Corpos Celestes	Giovani
2011	Cilada.com	Henrique
2013	Crô – O Filme	Baltazar Fonseca (Zoiúdo)
2014	Muita Calma Nessa Hora 2	Casé
2014	Getúlio	Coronel Scaffa

=== Theater ===
Year	Name
1995	Chicago 1930
1996	Agora é que são elas
1997	Pluft, O fantasminha
1998	O Processo
2000	A Bruxinha que era boa
2002	Linguiça no campo
2006	Os Leões
2008	Bolacha Maria – um punhado de neve que restou da tempestade
2016-17	O Grande Sucesso - The Musical

== Awards and nominations ==
=== International Emmy Awards ===
Year	Category	Nominated	Result	Ref.
2016	Best Actor	A Regra do Jogo	Nominated	

=== Grande Prêmio do Cinema Brasileiro ===
Year	Category	Nominated	Result	Ref.
2018	Best Actor	João, O Maestro	Nominated	

=== Troféu APCA ===
Year	Category	Nominated	Result	Ref.
2013	Best Actor	Salve Jorge	Nominated	
2015	Best Actor	A Regra do Jogo	Won	

=== Troféu Imprensa ===
Year	Category	Nominated	Result	Ref.
2015	Best Actor	Império	Won	

=== Melhores do Ano ===
Year	Category	Nominated	Result	Ref.
2008	Best Male Revelation	A Favorita	Nominated	
2014	Best Actor	Império	Won	
2015	Best Actor of Telenovela	A Regra do Jogo	Won	
2018	Best Actor in Series	Onde Nascem os Fortes	Won	

=== Prêmio Contigo! de TV ===
Year	Category	Nominated	Result	Ref.
2009	Best Male Revelation	A Favorita	Won	
2011	Best Actor	Escrito nas Estrelas	Nominated	
2013	Best Actor	Salve Jorge	Nominated	
2014	Best Supporting Actor	Além do Horizonte	Nominated	
2015	Best Actor	Império	Won	

=== Prêmio Quem de Televisão ===
Year	Category	Nominated	Result	Ref.
2010	Best Actor	Escrito nas Estrelas	Nominated	
2013	Best Supporting Actor	Salve Jorge	Won	
2014	Best Actor	Império	Nominated	
2015	Best Actor	A Regra do Jogo	Won	

=== Prêmio Extra de Televisão ===
Year	Category	Nominated	Result	Ref.
2009	Best Supporting Actor	Paraíso	Nominated	
2010	Best Actor	Escrito nas Estrelas	Nominated	
2013	Best Supporting Actor	Salve Jorge	Won	
2014	Best Actor	Império	Won	
2015	Best Actor	A Regra do Jogo	Nominated	

=== Prêmio Qualidade Brasil ===
Year	Category	Nominated	Result	Ref.
2010	Best Supporting Actor	Escrito nas Estrelas	Won	
2016	Best Actor in Musical Performance	O Grande Sucesso	Nominated	

== Discography ==
=== Solo ===
- 1995 – Camaleão
- 2001 – Maquinaíma
- 2011 – Vendo Amor
- 2014 – (Re)Vendo Amor

=== Group ===
- 1999 – Oquelatá quelateje
- 2002 – Oquetalá VIVO
- 2005 – Musicaprageada
- 2006 – Denorex80
- 2007 – Chic Science
