= Glória Perez =

Brazilian screenwriter (born 1948)

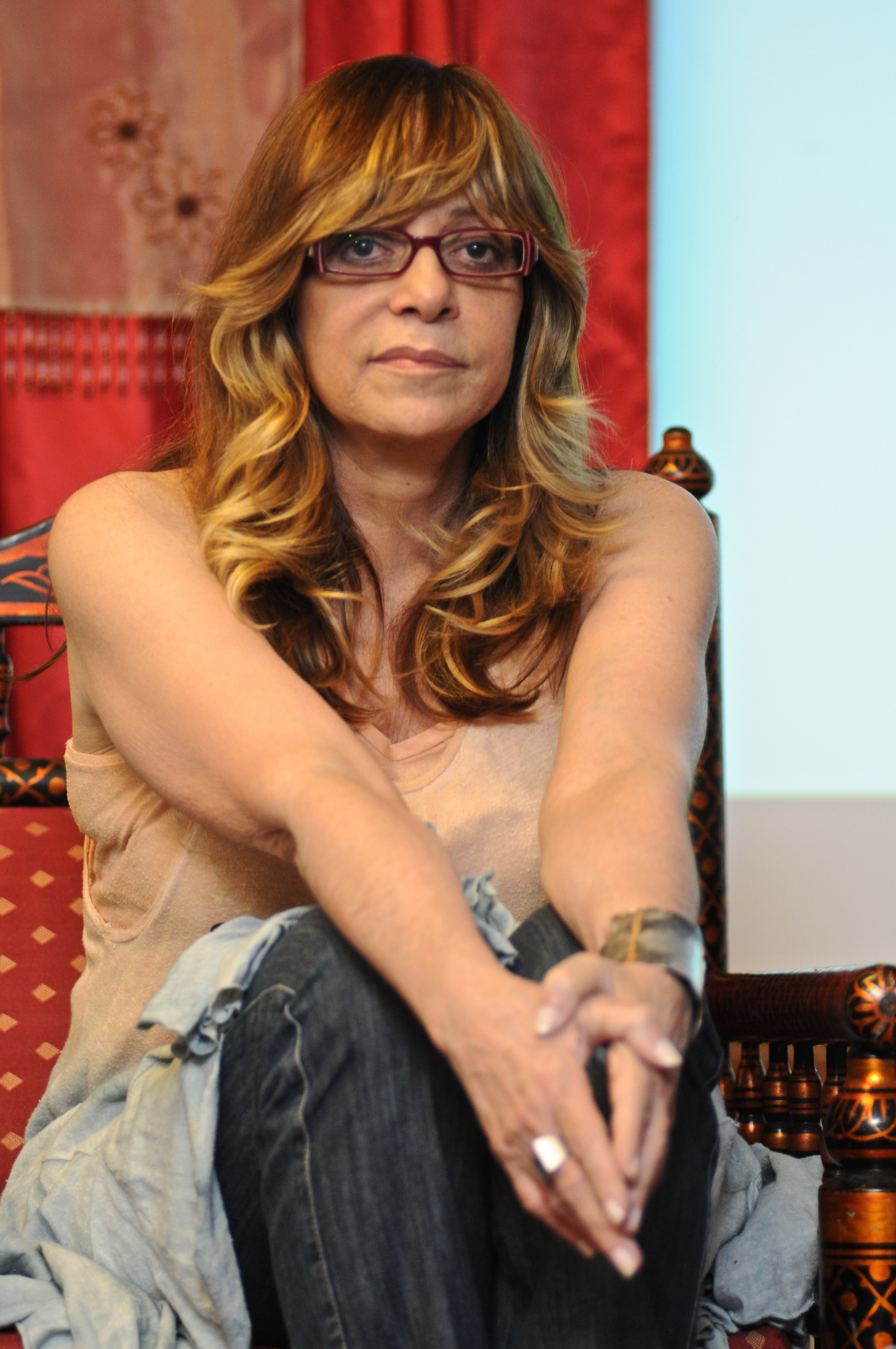
- Perez in 2008
- Born: Glória Maria Rebelo Ferrante; 25 September 1948 (age 78); Rio de Janeiro, DF, Brazil
- Education: University of Brasília (dropped out); Federal University of Rio de Janeiro
- Occupation: Screenwriter
- Years active: 1983–present
- Spouse: Luiz Carlos Saupiquet Perez (m. 1969; div. 1984)
- Children: 3 (2 deceased, including Daniella)

Glória Maria Rebelo Ferrante (Brazilian Portuguese: [ˈɡlɔɾjɐ ˈpɛɾis]; born 25 September 1948) is a Brazilian screenwriter.

== Biography ==
Born in Rio de Janeiro, Federal District of Brazil, Gloria is the daughter of lawyer Miguel Jeronimo Ferrante, Italian descendant, and teacher Maria Augusta Rebelo Ferrante, Portuguese descendant, both born and raised in Rio Branco. She moved with her family to Brasília, then to São Paulo and finally to Rio de Janeiro, where she married. She studied law and philosophy at the University of Brasília and graduated in history at the Federal University of Rio de Janeiro.

In 1979, Perez began her writing career on Rede Globo, writing a synopsis for an episode of the series Malu Mulher. The episode was never filmed but the synopsis drew the attention of legendary TV writer Janete Clair, who invited Perez to work as her assistant in 1983 in the telenovela Eu Prometo, starring Francisco Cuoco as Deputy Lucas Cantomaia. The telenovela addressed the backstage of Brazilian politics. After Clair died of cancer that same year, Perez was tasked with finishing the show, under the supervision of Clair's widower, writer Dias Gomes.

The following year, she shared writing credits with Aguinaldo Silva in Partido Alto. Set in Rio de Janeiro, the telenovela revolved around two female characters living in the south and suburbs of Rio. It starred Claudio Marzo, Raul Cortez, Elizabeth Savalla and Betty Faria.

Hired by TV Manchete in 1987, she wrote the telenovela Carmem, also set in Rio de Janeiro, starring Lucélia Santos and Paulo Betti.

She went back to Rede Globo in 1990 and wrote Desejo, a drama miniseries about the love triangle between Anna de Assis, her husband, the writer Euclides da Cunha, and the young Dilermando de Assis, starring Vera Fischer, Tarcisio Meira and Guilherme Fontes.

The same year, she wrote single-handedly her first telenovela for the network, Barriga de Aluguel, centred around the couple Ana and Zeca, played by Cassia Kis Magro and Victor Fasano, who can't have children and propose that Clara, played by Claudia Abreu, rent her womb for pregnancy.

Due to the success both the miniseries and the telenovela obtained, Gloria Perez was then asked to write her first telenovela in primetime: De Corpo e Alma (1992). The work was marked by the tragic murder of the author's daughter, Daniela Perez, who was cast in the role of Yasmin.

Her fifth telenovela, Explode Coração (1995), detailed the habits of the Romani people. lt also presented an important public service campaign: throughout its run, photographs of missing children were shown and, as a result, 64 children were found by their parents. This initiative to promote social and educational activities became a mark on the work of Perez.

In 1998, she wrote the miniseries Hilda Furacão, based on the novel by Roberto Drummond, with Ana Paula Arósio as the lead. Also in 1998, she wrote a few episodes for the series Mulher, which depicted the daily lives of two doctors, played by Patricia Pillar and Eva Wilma, employees of a clinic specialized in gynecology and obstetrics. Later that year, Gloria Perez returned to work with a text of Janete Clair: a second version of Pecado Capital, starring Francisco Cuoco, Carolina Ferraz and Eduardo Moscovis. First displayed in 1975, the plot of Pecado Capital had as its main axis the story of taxi driver Carlão and the ethical dilemma he goes through after finding a money bag from a robbery left in his car.

The best-known work of Perez probably is O Clone, a telenovela aired in 2001 by Rede Globo. Starring Murilo Benicio and Giovanna Antonelli, the plot addressed issues related to cloning, Islam and addiction. For the work, Perez was honored by the Brazilian Alcoholism and Drug Association (Abrad) and received the Personality of the Year award 2002, granted by the State Council Anti-Drug of Rio de Janeiro. In 2003, along with Jayme Monjardim, she was awarded by the major US agencies to combat drug trafficking, the FBI and the Drug Enforcement Administration (Dea). O Clone was a huge hit, airing in several countries all around the world. A remake co-produced by Rede Globo and Telemundo called El Clon was aired in 2010.

In 2005, she wrote the audience hit América, starring Deborah Secco and Murilo Benicio. The telenovela focused on the life of an illegal immigrant to the United States and the lives of those she left behind in Brazil.

In 2007, she wrote Amazônia – De Galvez a Chico Mendes, a miniseries about the conquest of Acre based on the works Terra Caída by José Potyguara, and O Seringal by Miguel Ferrante.

In 2009, Perez wrote Caminho das Índias, a telenovela that depicted Indian culture. Directed by Marcos Schechtman, it was the first Brazilian telenovela to win the International Emmy Award.

In 2012, she wrote her tenth telenovela, Salve Jorge, set in both Brazil and Turkey. It addressed the international trafficking of women and created a socio-educational action to combat trafficking of people related to sex, domestic work and illegal adoption. It starred Nanda Costa, Giovanna Antonelli and Claudia Raia.

In 2013, she worked as script supervisor for O Canto da Sereia, a miniseries based on the novel by Nelson Motta. The following year, she wrote Dupla Identidade, which was the first Brazilian series entirely shot and post-produced in 4K.

After five years, she made her comeback to the primetime in 2017 with the telenovela A Força do Querer.

Currently, she is the only telenovela writer on Rede Globo who doesn't work with collaborators.

== Awards and nominations ==
Year	Award	Category	Nominated work	Result
1998	São Paulo Association of Art Critics Awards	Television: Best Drama	Hilda Furacão	Won
2002	Troféu Imprensa	Best Telenovela	O Clone	Won
2009	37th International Emmy Awards	Best Telenovela	Caminho das Índias	Won
