= Avenida Brasil 2 =

- Genre: Telenovela
- Created by: João Emanuel Carneiro
- Written by: Vincent Villari; Eliane Garcia; Marcia Prates; Marta Rangel; Paula Amaral
- Directed by: Ricardo Waddington; Henrique Sauer
- Starring: Adriana Esteves; Murilo Benício; Débora Falabella; Cauã Reymond; Juliano Cazarré; Letícia Isnard; Eliane Giardini; Marcos Caruso; Thalita Carauta
- Country of origin: Brazil
- Original language: Portuguese

Production
- Production company: Estúdios Globo

Original release
- Network: TV Globo

Related
- Avenida Brasil (2012)

Avenida Brasil 2 is an upcoming Brazilian telenovela created by João Emanuel Carneiro that is set to premiere on TV Globo in January 2027. It is a sequel to the 2012 telenovela Avenida Brasil, continuing the events in the Divino neighborhood and focusing on the story of Carminha, portrayed by Adriana Esteves, who stars alongside Débora Falabella, Murilo Benício, Cauã Reymond, Eliane Giardini, Marcos Caruso, Juliano Cazarré, Letícia Isnard, and Thalita Carauta.

== Cast ==
- Adriana Esteves as Carmen Lúcia Moreira de Souza Araújo "Carminha"
- Débora Falabella as Rita Moura dos Santos Araújo
- Murilo Benício as Jorge Araújo "Tufão"
- Cauã Reymond as Jorge Moreira de Araújo Filho "Jorginho"
- Eliane Giardini as Muricy Araújo
- Juliano Cazarré as Adauto dos Santos
- Karol Lannes as Agatha Moreira Araújo
- Marcos Caruso as Laércio Araújo "Leleco"
- Letícia Isnard as Ivana Araújo Oliveira
- Thalita Carauta as Salomé
- Ernani Moraes as Espiridão
- Drico Alves as Juninho
- Thomás Aquino as Renan Vitória
- Mel Maia
- Jéssica Ellen as Jade
- Fábio Scalon
- Cris Vianna
- Thiago Rodrigues
- Karine Teles
- Roberto Bonfim
- Ravel Andrade

=== Guest stars ===
- Heloísa Périssé as Monalisa Barbosa da Silva

== Production ==
=== Development ===
The first reports about a sequel of Avenida Brasil began circulating in the press on 6 November 2025, in an article published on Leo Dias' website. A sequel to Avenida Brasil had long been requested by audiences and the international market due to the success of the first season, which broke viewership and popularity records in Brazil and abroad, and because it left some storylines unresolved. Furthermore, following the lower-than-expected reception of the Vale Tudo remake, coupled with behind-the-scenes controversies, TV Globo decided to prioritize direct sequels to telenovelas such as Êta Mundo Melhor! and No Rancho Fundo, even though the latter was presented and marketed as an epilogue to Mar do Sertão, with both shows recording satisfactory ratings for the 6:00 p.m. time slot. The network had even already finalized the deal to export the telenovela before production officially began and confirmed its premiere for January 2027, following Quem Ama Cuida, written by Walcyr Carrasco and Claudia Souto. The story was officially approved in January 2026.

Ricardo Waddington has been tapped to once again take on the role of lead director for the telenovela, marking his return to telenovelas since Boogie Oogie (2014–15). The telenovela was announced by the press as Avenida Brasil 2, although Os Filhos do Divino had been considered as one of the titles and was officially presented as the name of the sequel. However, the title listed in the telenovela's synopsis did not sit well with Globo executives, who advocated for a name that would have more impact. Furthermore, the network's top brass felt that the word "Divino" had a dual meaning and could be confused with a religious term, even though it refers to the neighborhood where the first part of the story took place. Finally, on 8 September 2026, the network officially confirmed Avenida Brasil 2 as the definitive title in a short teaser on social media. To determine the audience's reception of the show, the network scheduled a rerun of the first part on the Vale a Pena Ver de Novo programming block, premiering on 30 March 2026, replacing Rainha da Sucata.

=== Casting ===
Among the first cast members confirmed were Adriana Esteves and Murilo Benício, reprising their roles from the original telenovela. Some actors from the 2012 telenovela even offered to participate in the sequel, such as Eliane Giardini, Marcos Caruso, Juliano Cazarré, Otávio Augusto, and Cacau Protásio. Cauã Reymond was invited by the network to reprise his role as Jorginho, as was Débora Falabella as Rita, Heloísa Périssé to return as Monalisa, but only in a guest role, since her character is expected to die in the sequel, and Letícia Isnard to reprise Ivana. Originally played by Karol Lannes, the role of Agatha was offered to Débora Ozório. However, Lannes ended up being the favorite to reprise the character, marking her return to telenovelas since 2012 after her participation in the original telenovela.
