= Elas por Elas =

Elas por Elas may refer to either of two Brazilian telenovelas produced and aired by TV Globo:

- Elas por Elas (1982 TV series)
- Elas por Elas (2023 TV series)
