= Adriana Esteves =

Brazilian actress

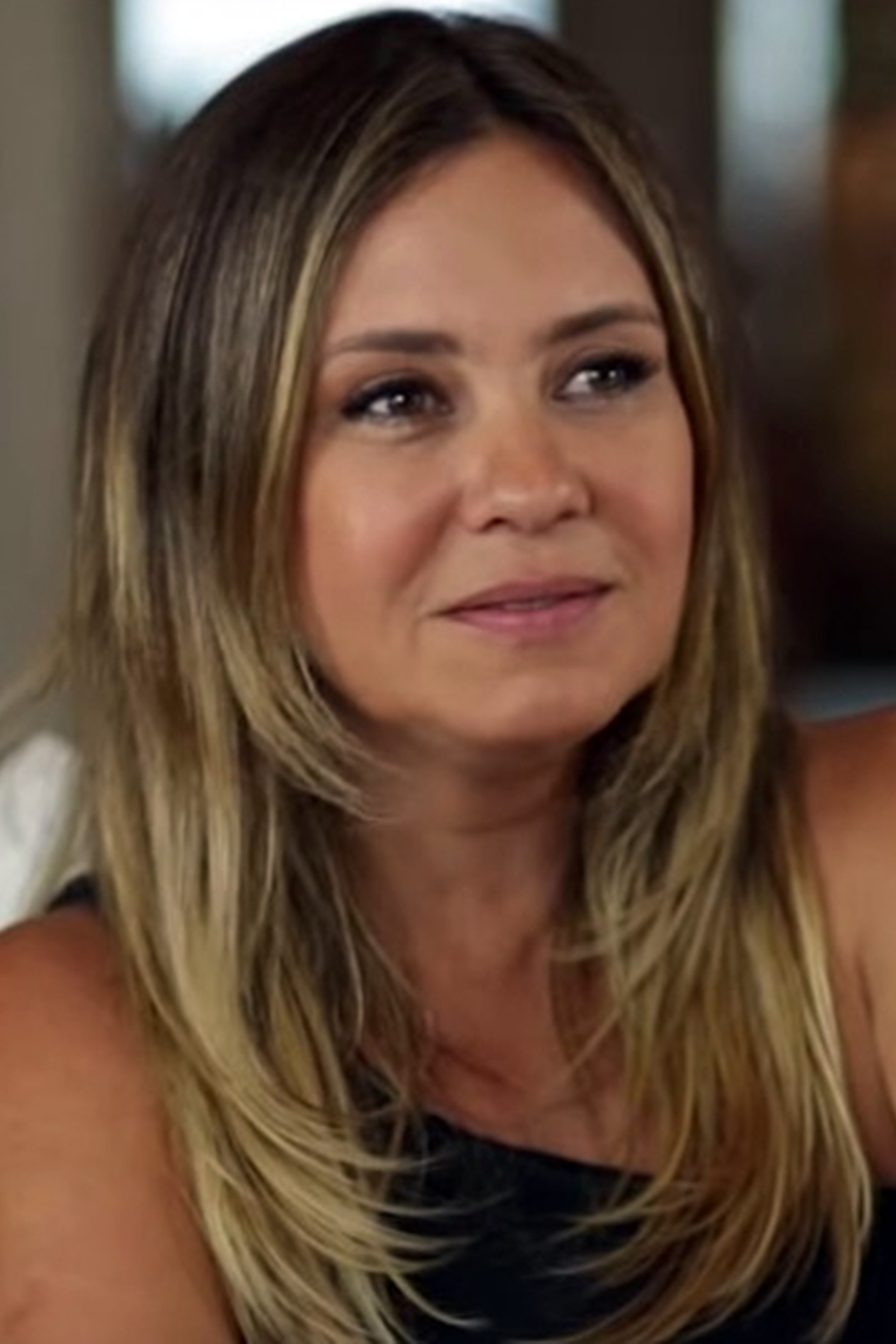
- Esteves in 2019
- Born: Adriana Esteves Agostinho; 15 December 1969 (age 56); Rio de Janeiro, Brazil
- Education: Gama Filho University
- Occupation: Actress
- Years active: 1988–present
- Spouses: Totila Jordan (m. 1988; div. 1993) Marco Ricca (m. 1995; div. 2004) Vladimir Brichta (m. 2006)
- Children: 2
- Parent(s): Regina Esteves Agostinho (mother); Paulo Felipe Agostinho (father)

Adriana Esteves Agostinho Brichta (born 15 December 1969) is a Brazilian actress best known for her work in telenovelas, such as Brazil Avenue (2012) and A Mother's Love (2021).

She was nominated twice for the International Emmy Award, for her works in Songs of Betrayal (Dalva e Herivelto: uma Canção de Amor) and Above Justice (Justiça).

== Career ==
Daughter of Regina Esteves Agostinho and Paulo Felipe Agostinho, Adriana Esteves began her career as a model and got her first job on television as part of the series, "Star for a Day", on the TV show Domingão do Faustão.

Her first television appearance was as an extra on the soap opera Vale Tudo. She was also a successful model. Her character debut was in the 1989 telenovela Top Model.

In 2005, she took on the part of Celinha on the series, Toma Lá, Dá Cá. When the program aired on the Globo in 2007, Adriana, after maternity leave with her second child, reprised her role as Celinha.

While still acting in Toma Lá, Dá Cá, Adriana recorded the miniseries Dalva e Herivelto: uma Canção de Amor, playing the singer-songwriter Dalva de Oliveira. The miniseries aired in January 2010. In the same year, she starred the episode "A Vingativa do Méier" of TV series As Cariocas.

In 2011, she was cast as Julia, the protagonist of Morde & Assopra, who was part of a love triangle with scientist Ícaro (Mateus Solano) and farmer Abner (Marcos Pasquim). In 2012, she gained notoriety for interpreting the villainess Carminha on the soap opera Avenida Brasil, written by João Emanuel Carneiro. She received praise from critics and audiences alike for her performance and was enshrined as one of the greatest villainesses of Brazilian television — only surpassed by Odete Roitman of Vale Tudo, Nazaré Tedesco of Senhora do Destino and Flora of A Favorita.

== Personal life ==
Adriana's first boyfriend, who later became her husband, was jujutsu teacher Totila Jordan. They married in 1988 and remained together for two years, divorcing in 1990.

In 1994, she married actor Marco Ricca. A year later, she discovered he suffered from anxiety and panic disorder. In 2000, they had a son together, Felipe. In 2004, Ricca and Esteves got a divorce.

After months of separation from Marco, she started dating actor Vladimir Brichta. In February 2006, they married. In the same year, after a few months of marriage, their first son, Vicente, was born. Adriana became the stepmother of Agnes Brichta, born in 1997, who was Vladimir Brichta's daughter from his first wife, singer Gena, who died in 1999 of leukemia.

Esteves is a supporter of Rio de Janeiro football club Botafogo.

== Filmography ==
=== Television ===
Year	Title	Role	Notes
1985	Perdidos na Noite	Herself	Pilot: "Controle Remoto"
1988	Band Fórmula 1	Presenter	
1988	Evidência	Presenter	
1988	Vale Tudo	Model	
1989	Top Model	Cristina "Tininha"	
1990	Delegacia de Mulheres	Manú	Episode: "O Aborto"
1990	Meu Bem, Meu Mal	Patrícia Melo	
1991	Caso Especial	Marina	Episode: "Marina"
1992	Pedra sobre Pedra	Marina Farias Batista	
1992	Você Decide	Maria / Norminha	Episode: "Águas Passadas"
1992	Especial Leandro e Leonardo	Malissa	TV special
1993	Renascer	Mariana Paiva Ferreira	
1994	Você Decide	Ana	Episode: "Anjos sem Asas"
1994	Confissões de Adolescente	Viviane	Episode: "A Eleição"
1995	Decadência	Carla Tavares Branco	
1995	A Comédia da Vida Privada	Maria Helena	Episode: "O Pesadelo da casa Própria"
1996	Razão de Viver	Zilda Ferreira	
1997	A Indomada	Lúcia Helena de Mendonça e Albuquerque / Eulália de Mendonça e Albuquerque (First phase)	
1998	Mulher	Liliana	Episode: "O Princípio de Tudo"
1998	Didi Malasarte	Lili	Year-end special
1998-1999	Torre de Babel	Sandra da Silva "Sandrinha"	
2000-2001	O Cravo e a Rosa	Catarina Batista	
2001	Brava Gente	Marina	Episode: "Como Matar um Playboy"
2002	Coração de Estudante	Amélia Mourão "Amelinha"	
2003	Kubanacan	Lola Calderón	
2004	Senhora do Destino	Young Nazaré Tedesco	First phase
2005	A História de Rosa	Rosa	40 Years Globo special
2005	A Lua Me Disse	Heloísa Queiroz	
2005	A Turma do Didi	Herself	
2005	Sitcom.br	Mother	Episode: "A Dura Vida de Uma Mãe"
2006	Belíssima	Stella Assumpção (voice)	Episodes dated 12 – 14 May 2006
2005-2009	Toma Lá, Dá Cá	Célia Regina "Celinha"	
2010	Dalva e Herivelto: uma Canção de Amor	Dalva de Oliveira	
2010	As Cariocas	Celi	Episode: "A Vingativa do Méier"
2011	Morde & Assopra	Júlia Freire Aquino de Medeiros	
2012	Avenida Brasil	Carmen Lúcia Moreira de Souza "Carminha"	
2015	Felizes para Sempre?	Tânia Drummond	
2015	Babilônia	Inês Ferraz Junqueira	
2016	Justiça	Fátima Libéria do Nascimento	
2018	Segundo Sol	Laureta Bottini Maranhão "Laureta"	
2018	Assédio	Stela Nascimento	
2019	As Vilãs que Amamos	Herself	Episode: "15"
2019-2021	Amor de Mãe	Thelma Nunes Viana	
2023	The Others	Cibele Costa Gonçalves	
2024	Mania de Você	Mércia Dumas	
2025	Show 60 Anos	Carmen Lúcia Moreira de Souza "Carminha"	Television special
2027	Avenida Brasil 2	Carmen Lúcia Moreira de Souza "Carminha"	

=== Films ===
Year	Title	Role
1991	Inspetor Faustão e o Mallandro	Singer
1995	As Meninas	Lorena
1999	Tiradentes	Bárbara Heliodora
1999	O Trapalhão e a Luz Azul	Juliana / Anajuli
2006	Trair e Coçar É Só Começar	Olímpia
2015	Minions	Scarlet Overkill (Brazilian voice dubbing)
2015	Real Beleza	Anita
2016	Mundo Cão	Dilza
2016	Canastra Suja	Maria
2018	Loveling	Sônia
2021	Marighella	Clara Charf
2022	Executive Order	Isabel Garcez

=== Music Videos ===
Year	Artist	Song
1994	Roberto Carlos	"Quero Lhe Falar Do Meu Amor"
1997	Paulinho Moska	"A Seta e o Alvo"
2014	Ana Carolina	"Pole Dance"

=== Stage ===
Year	Title	Role
1992	A Dama e o Vagabundo	Cookie "Dama"
1994	A Falecida	Falecida
2001	Ponto de Vista	Amy
2002	Only You	Júlia
2007	Auto de Angicos	Maria de Déa "Maria Bonita"
2026	Quem tem Medo de Virginia Woolf?	TBA

== Awards and nominations ==
=== International Emmy Awards ===
Year	Category	Nominated	Result	Ref.
2011	Best actress	Dalva e Herivelto: uma Canção de Amor	Nominated	
2017	Best actress	Justiça	Nominated	

=== Cartagena Film Festival ===
Year	Category	Nominated	Result	Ref.
1996	Best actress	As Meninas	Won	

=== Gramado Film Festival ===
Year	Category	Nominated	Result	Ref.
2018	Best Supporting Actress	Loveling	Won	

=== Festival de Cinema Itinerante da Língua Portuguesa ===
Year	Category	Nominated	Result	Ref.
2016	Best actress	Mundo Cão	Won	

=== Grande Prêmio do Cinema Brasileiro ===
Year	Category	Nominated	Result	Ref.
2017	Best Actress	Mundo Cão	Nominated	
2019	Best Actress	Canastra Suja	Nominated	
2019	Best Supporting Actress	Loveling	Won	
2022	Best Actress	Marighella	Nominated	
2023	Best Supporting Actress	Executive Order	Won	
2025	Best Television Show Actress	Os Outros	Won	

=== Troféu APCA ===
Year	Category	Nominated	Result	Ref.
1994	Best Actress	Renascer	Nominated	
1998	Best Actress	Torre de Babel	Won	
2012	Best Actress	Avenida Brasil	Won	
2016	Best Actress	Justiça	Nominated	
2018	Best Actress	Assédio/Segundo Sol	Nominated	
2023	Best Actress	Os Outros	Nominated	
2024	Best Actress	Os Outros	Nominated	

=== Troféu Imprensa ===
Year	Category	Nominated	Result	Ref.
1993	Best Actress	Renascer	Nominated	
1998	Best Actress	Torre de Babel	Won	
2000	Best Actress	O Cravo e a Rosa	Nominated	
2013	Best Actress	Avenida Brasil	Won	
2019	Best Actress	Segundo Sol	Won	
2025	Best Actress	Mania de Você	Nominated	

=== Melhores do Ano ===
Year	Category	Nominated	Result	Ref.
1999	Best Actress	O Cravo e a Rosa	Won	
2003	Best Actress	Kubanacan	Won	
2012	Best Actress	Avenida Brasil	Won	
2016	Best Actress in a Series	Justiça	Won	
2018	Best Character	Segundo Sol	Won	
2019	Best Actress in a Series	Assédio	Won	
2021	Best Actress	Amor de Mãe	Nominated	
2023	Series Actress	Os Outros	Won	

=== Prêmio Contigo! de TV ===
Year	Category	Nominated	Result	Ref.
1997	Best Supporting Actress	Razão de Viver	Nominated	
2008	Best Actress in a Comedy Series	Toma Lá, Dá Cá	Nominated	
2009	Best Actress in a Comedy Series	Toma Lá, Dá Cá	Nominated	
2010	Best Actress in a Series	Dalva e Herivelto: uma Canção de Amor	Won	
2011	Best Actress	Morde & Assopra	Nominated	
2013	Best Actress	Avenida Brasil	Won	
2015	Best Actress in a Series	Felizes para Sempre?	Nominated	
2018	Best Actress	Segundo Sol	Nominated	
2020	Best Actress	Amor de Mãe	Nominated	
2021	Best Telenovela Actress	Amor de Mãe	Nominated	

=== Prêmio Extra de Televisão ===
Year	Category	Nominated	Result	Ref.
1998	Best Actress	Torre de Babel	Nominated	
2010	Best Actress in a Series	Dalva e Herivelto: uma Canção de Amor	Nominated	
2012	Best Actress	Avenida Brasil	Won	
2016	Best Actress	Justiça	Won	

=== Prêmio Qualidade Brasil ===
Year	Category	Nominated	Result	Ref.
2008	Best Actress in a Comedy Series	Toma Lá, Dá Cá	Nominated	
2009	Best Actress in a Comedy Series	Toma Lá, Dá Cá	Nominated	
2010	Best Actress in a Series	Dalva e Herivelto: uma Canção de Amor	Won	

=== Prêmio Quem de Televisão ===
Year	Category	Nominated	Result	Ref.
2012	Best Actress	Avenida Brasil	Won	
2016	Best Actress	Justiça	Won	

=== Troféu Internet ===
Year	Category	Nominated	Result	Ref.
2013	Best Actress	Avenida Brasil	Won	
2019	Best Actress	Segundo Sol	Nominated	
2025	Best Actress	Mania de Você	Nominated	

=== Prêmio Botequim Cultural ===
Year	Category	Nominated	Result	Ref.
2013	Best Actress	Avenida Brasil	Won	

=== Meus Prêmios Nick ===
Year	Category	Nominated	Result	Ref.
2012	Favorite character	Avenida Brasil	Nominated	

=== Troféu AIB De Imprensa ===
Year	Category	Nominated	Result	Ref.
2015	Best Actress	Babilônia	Won	

=== Campo Grande Latin American Film, Video and TV Festival ===
Year	Category	Nominated	Result	Ref.
2000	Best Actress	O Cravo e a Rosa	Won	

=== UOL TV and Celebrities Trophy ===
Year	Category	Nominated	Result	Ref.
2018	Best Actress	Segundo Sol	Won	

=== Shell Theatre Award ===
Year	Category	Nominated	Result	Ref.
2007	Best Actress	Auto de Angicos	Nominated	

=== O Globo - Prêmio Faz Diferença ===
Year	Category	Nominated	Result	Ref.
2016	Best Actress	Justiça	Nominated	
2018	Best Actress	Assédio/Segundo Sol	Nominated	

=== Sesc Festival Best Movies ===
Year	Category	Nominated	Result	Ref.
2016	Best Actress	Real Beleza	Nominated	
2019	Best Actress	Loveling/Canastra Suja	Nominated	

=== Guarani Brazilian Film Award ===
Year	Category	Nominated	Result	Ref.
2015	Best Actress	Real Beleza	Nominated	
2016	Best Supporting Actress	Mundo Cão	Nominated	

=== Prêmio Melhores da Revista da TV - O Globo ===
Year	Category	Nominated	Result	Ref.
1998	Best Actress	Torre de Babel	Won	

=== Prêmio Cosmos ===
Year	Category	Nominated	Result	Ref.
2023	Best Female Performance in a Series	Os Outros	Nominated	

=== SEC Awards ===
Year	Category	Nominated	Result	Ref.
2024	Best Actress in a National Series	Os Outros	Nominated	

=== Splash Awards ===
Year	Category	Nominated	Result	Ref.
2023	Best Performance in a National Series	Os Outros	Won	

=== Melhores do Ano NaTelinha ===
Year	Category	Nominated	Result	Ref.
2021	Best Actress	Amor de Mãe	Won	
2023	Best Actress	Os Outros	Nominated	
