= Rua Augusta =

Rua Augusta may refer to:

- Rua Augusta (São Paulo), a street in São Paulo, Brazil
- Rua Augusta (TV series), Brazilian drama television series
