= David Junior =

David Junior may refer to:

- David Junior (horse)
- David Junior (actor)
