= Elas por Elas (2023 TV series) =

- Genre: Telenovela
- Based on: Elas por Elas by Cassiano Gabus Mendes
- Developed by: Thereza Falcão; Alessandro Marson
- Written by: Letícia Mey; Wendell Bendelack; Caroline Santos
- Directed by: Amora Mautner
- Starring: Deborah Secco; Késia Estácio; Isabel Teixeira; Thalita Carauta; Mariana Santos; Karine Teles; Maria Clara Spinelli
- Opening theme: "Coisas da Vida (Elas por Elas)" by Preta Gil, Ivete Sangalo & Duda Beat
- Country of origin: Brazil
- Original language: Portuguese
- No. of seasons: 1
- No. of episodes: 171

Production
- Production company: Estúdios Globo

Original release
- Network: TV Globo
- Release: 25 September 2023 – 12 April 2024

Elas por Elas (English title: Crossed Paths) is a Brazilian telenovela developed by Thereza Falcão and Alessandro Marson, based on the 1982 telenovela of the same name. It aired on TV Globo from 25 September 2023 to 12 April 2024. The telenovela stars Deborah Secco, Késia Estácio, Isabel Teixeira, Thalita Carauta, Mariana Santos, Karine Teles and Maria Clara Spinelli.

== Cast ==
- Deborah Secco as Lara
- Késia Estácio as Thaís
- Isabel Teixeira as Helena
- Mariana Santos as Natália
- Thalita Carauta as Adriana
- Karine Teles as Carolina "Carol"
- Maria Clara Spinelli as Renée
- Lázaro Ramos as Mário Fofoca
- Cássio Gabus Mendes as Otávio
- Mateus Solano as Jonas
  - Dani Flomin as young Jonas
- Alexandre Borges as Pedro
- Marcos Caruso as Sérgio
- Filipe Bragança as Giovani
- Rayssa Bratillieri as Isis
- Monique Alfradique as Érica
- Valentina Herszage as Cristina "Cris"
- Paula Cohen as Miriam
- Luis Navarro as Eduardo
- Claudia Mauro
- Paula Burlamaqui
- César Mello as Wagner
- Mariah da Penha as Raquel
- Cosme dos Santos as Evilásio
- Castorine as Yeda
- Mary Sheila
- Viétia Zangrandi
- Maria Ceiça as Marlene
- Diego Cruz as Aramis
- Bia Santana
- Kíria Malheiros
- Chao Chen
- Richard Abelha as Tony
- Liza Del Dala
- Jade Mascarenhas
- Fernanda Lasevicth
- Regiana Antonini as Maninha
- Luciano Mallmann

=== Guest stars ===
- Sergio Guizé as Átila
- Luan Argollo as Bruno

== Production ==
In December 2022, it was reported that the synopsis of Thereza Falcão and Alessandro Marson's next telenovela was approved, which, unlike their previous works, would be a contemporary telenovela, and was scheduled to premiere after the end of Amor Perfeito, in the second half of 2023. The following month, it was announced that it would be a remake of the 1982 telenovela Elas por Elas, created by Cassiano Gabus Mendes, with Amora Mautner attached to direct. Pre-production began in April 2023, with a meeting between the cast and crew at Estúdios Globo. On 17 July 2023, filming began in Rio de Janeiro, the city defined for the setting of the story, unlike the original version which was set in São Paulo.

== Ratings ==
Season	Episodes	First aired		Last aired		Avg. viewers (points)
Season	Episodes	Date	Viewers (points)	Date	Viewers (points)	Avg. viewers (points)
1	171	25 September 2023	20.1	12 April 2024	20.0	15.3
