= Assédio =

Brazilian drama television series

- Genre: Drama
- Created by: Maria Camargo
- Starring: Antônio Calloni; Adriana Esteves; Paolla Oliveira; Mariana Lima; Jéssica Ellen; Hermila Guedes; Elisa Volpatto; Vera Fischer; Juliana Carneiro da Cunha; Bianca Müller
- Opening theme: "Silent Night" by LORO Bardot
- Country of origin: Brazil
- Original language: Portuguese
- No. of seasons: 1
- No. of episodes: 10

Production
- Executive producer: Lucas Zardo
- Cinematography: Marcelo Trotta
- Production companies: Rede Globo; O2 Filmes

Original release
- Network: Globoplay
- Release: September 21, 2018

Assédio (English: Harassment) is a Brazilian drama web television series produced by Rede Globo in association with O2 Filmes that premiered on the streaming service Globoplay on September 21, 2018. Based on the book “A Clínica – A Farsa e os Crimes de Roger Abdelmassih” by Vicente Vilardaga about the former Brazilian physician Roger Abdelmassih. The series is written by Maria Camargo and directed by Amora Mautner.

== Premise ==
Dr. Roger Sadala is a famous and popular physician, specializing in artificial insemination. A professional above any suspicion, responsible for the birth of thousands of babies.

Dozens of women enter his clinic with the dream of becoming mothers, but during the procedure they are drugged and raped by the doctor. Later it is also discovered that in addition to sexual crimes, the physician uses a somewhat unorthodox method in his reproductive processes. Discovering the various cases, numerous women unite by pain and decide to join forces to denounce the doctor and put him to prison.

== Cast ==
- Antonio Calloni as Roger Sadala
- Adriana Esteves as Stela Nascimento
- Paolla Oliveira as Carolina Malfatti
- Mariana Lima as Glória Sadala
- Jéssica Ellen as Daiane de Palma
- Denise Weinberg as Julieta Nascimento
- Hermila Guedes as Maria José
- Elisa Volpatto as Mira Silmões
- Vera Fischer as Haydée
- Juliana Carneiro da Cunha as Olímpia Sadala
- Bianca Müller as Tamires Sadala
- Leonardo Netto as Homero
- Pedro Nercessian as Pedro Paulo
- Sabrina Greve as Leila
- Sílvia Lourenço as Clarice Sadala
- Gabriel Muglia as Henrique Sadala
- Noemi Marinho as Abigail (Biga)

== Episodes ==
No.	Title	Original release date
1	"Stela"	September 21, 2018
2	"Eugênia"	September 21, 2018
3	"Maria José"	September 21, 2018
4	"Vera"	September 21, 2018
5	"Daiane"	September 21, 2018
6	"Eva"	September 21, 2018
7	"As vozes"	September 21, 2018
8	"O processo"	September 21, 2018
9	"O julgamento"	September 21, 2018
10	"A busca"	September 21, 2018

== Awards and nominations ==
=== Paulista Association of Art Critics ===
Year	Category	Nominated	Result	Ref.
2018	Best actress	Adriana Esteves	Nominated	
2018	Best Director	Amora Mautner	Won	
2018	Best Actor	Antônio Calloni	Nominated	
