= Torre de Babel (TV series) =

- Genre: Telenovela
- Created by: Silvio de Abreu
- Directed by: Denise Saraceni
- Starring: Tarcísio Meira; Glória Menezes; Tony Ramos; Maitê Proença; Cláudia Raia; Edson Celulari; Letícia Sabatella; Adriana Esteves; Marcos Palmeira; Natália do Vale; Christiane Torloni; Sílvia Pfeifer; Juca de Oliveira; Karina Barum; Cláudia Jimenez; Victor Fasano; Cleyde Yáconis
- Country of origin: Brazil
- Original language: Portuguese
- No. of episodes: 203

Production
- Running time: 60 minutes

Original release
- Network: TV Globo
- Release: 25 May 1998 – 16 January 1999

Torre de Babel (English: Tower of Babel) is a Brazilian primetime telenovela produced by TV Globo and broadcast in its traditional schedule of 9 p.m. between 25 May 1998 and 16 January 1999.

Starring Tarcísio Meira, Glória Menezes, Cláudia Raia, Edson Celulari, Letícia Sabatella, Marcos Palmeira, Adriana Esteves, Juca de Oliveira, Natália do Vale, Maitê Proença and Tony Ramos in the lead roles.

== History ==
=== Synopsis ===
==== First phase ====
The former expert in fireworks, José Clementino gets a job as a bricklayer in the construction of a magnificent shopping center, one of the many works carried out by the construction engineer, César Toledo. During the feast of the ridge, where engineers and workers gather to celebrate the laying of the slab work, Clementino's wife flirts with several men. At one point, José Clementino goes looking for his wife and finds her in a far corner of the building having sex with two men. Overcome with rage, Clementino kills his wife and one of the men with paddle strokes. The family hears the screams and Toledo contains Clementino, with the help of a group of workers. Shocked by the violence of the employee, the employer calls the police, and later earns an indictment against him at trial. His testimony is crucial to the eventual conviction of Clementino.

==== Second phase ====
Twenty years pass, and in 1998 José Clementino is freed from jail. The time during which he was exposed to the harsh reality of the prison system made him a man even more bitter. He is rejected by most people around him, including his own relatives, because of the double stigma of being an ex-convict and unemployed. Although he tries to rebuild his life, Clementino remains obsessed by the desire to seek revenge against César Toledo, whom he deems largely responsible for his conviction.

César Toledo has become a powerful businessman, but leads a life full of troubles. His marriage to Martha is in crisis and can only be sustained thanks to her efforts. Their union takes a turn for the worse when César finds an old love, the lawyer Lucia Prado, and the two begin a romance. On top of that Martha is still dealing with the trauma of her father's death and even begins to develop suspicions that César might have been involved in the car accident which led to that death.

César and Martha's relationship with their children is also characterized by tensions. The eldest, Henrique, administers the affairs of the mall, but has a very different temperament from his father. Extravagant and vain, he welcomes the inauguration of the Tropical Towers by organizing a pompous carnival event. Alexandre is the middle child of the Toledo family. A young law student who resents still being dependent on financial help from his father, he wishes to complete his studies before leaving home. The youngest son, Guilherme, is the main source of the torments of the family. A drug addict and social outcast, he keeps fleeing from rehab clinics and trying to extort money from relatives and friends to support his habit. During the inauguration of the mall, after trying to get money without success, he breaks into the main lobby of the building with a motorbike and has to be restrained by security guards. Guilherme later gets arrested for the homicide of a drug trafficker to whom he owed a lot of money and in spite of the help provided from his family to have him released from jail, he eventually dies a tragic death.

Following the release of José Clementino from jail, he and his family work and live in the junkyard of his father, Agenor, a cruel and violent man who physically and psychologically tortures his children and grand-children. There live Clementino's two half-brothers, Gustinho and Boneca, as well as Shirley, his youngest daughter, a sweet and gracious young woman with a physical defect in the leg. She takes care of Jamanta, a person with mental disability who lives with the family and works in the junkyard with her uncles, managing a diner that prepares meals for blue collar workers. In that cold and lifeless environment, there are some of the best comedic moments of the telenovela, thanks to the interaction of Gustinho and Boneca - making fun of and engaging with one another - and the intricacies of Jamanta, a character who fell into the graces of the public. Much to Clementino's annoyance, his two half-brothers regularly get into brawls and fights.

Shirley develops a close friendship with Adriano, a shy young man who also has a handicap. Adriano is in love with her and even asks to marry her. However Shirley turns down the proposal because she knows Adriano's father does not approve of their relationship. To her parents' dismay she starts a relationship with Dino, only to realize the only genuine feelings she has are for Adriano.

José Clementino's other daughter is Sandrinha Clementino (Sandra). Unlike Shirley, she has never forgiven her father for his past and has negative feelings in relation to all other family members. Sandrinha is a young and ambitious character who works as a waitress at the diner of Edmundo Falcão and will do anything to move up in life. This is how she gets involved with Alexandre Toledo. Completely in love with the girl, he later realizes that she is interested mainly in their money and will betray him whenever possible.

In the cafeteria of Edmundo Falcão also works the waitress Bina Colombo, a spontaneous, funny but also naïve woman, who dreams the dream of becoming rich. She lives with Aunt Sadie in a small apartment, but the lives of two changes when, thanks to a quirk of fate, the waitress becomes the owner of a fortune. Bina is always accompanied by her best friend and co-worker at the cafeteria, the docile cook Luzineide, whom she dazzles with her exuberant personality. Bina frequently prevents the girl from uttering a word by instructing her to "Shut up, Luzineide!".

Kicking off his plan for revenge, José Clementino gets a job as caretaker of Tropical Towers. He plans to install explosives in the building. His idea is to destroy the great enterprise of César Toledo, but without hurting any innocent people. The explosives are meant to be detonated when the mall is empty. However his existence changes completely when he falls in love with Clara, who is none other than César's sister-in-law. Determined to change his ways so that he can win over her, Clementino calls off the plan he had conceived to destroy Tropical Towers via an explosion.

For mysterious reasons, the explosion still happens, the artifacts being triggered before the scheduled time while the building is still full of visitors. The explosion leaves many injured and kills several people. Some characters featured earlier in the novela die in the explosion of Tropical Towers. Guilherme, the troubled son who torments the lives of Martha and César Toledo, is one of them. Two other victims are the fashion designer Rafaela Katz as well as her associate and former model Leila Sampaio. Rafaela and Leila are owners of a fashion boutique and have a loving relationship. Before dying Rafaela has even revealed to Leila that Clementino, whom she employed for a while in her fashion boutique, is in fact her brother.

Meanwhile the businesswoman Angela Vidal, right-hand man of the Toledo administration of the mall, nurtures a platonic passion for Henrique Toledo, her close friend and coworker. Henrique, however, is married to Vilma, besides being an incorrigible womanizer who collects romantic conquests, raising the suspicions of Angela. Gradually the latter's passion becomes increasingly unhealthy. To get what she wants, she turns into a cold and ruthless killer, who comes to celebrate the deaths of her victims. Angela murders Vilma Toledo believing that in her absence, Henrique will grow close to her and eventually fall in love with her. Instead Henrique becomes a prime suspect in his wife's murder and incurs the wrath of his mother-in-law Josefa, who is adamant that he has to be the murderer. Josefa only changes her mind upon being informed by Martha that a finger ring belonging to Vilma was found in Angela Vidal's car.

Later during a sting operation Angela is heard confessing to Luísa - the elderly woman who raised her and now works for the Toledo household - that she murdered Vilma and has even been thinking about murdering other members of the Toledo family as well. Luísa, who had participated in the operation thinking that Angela could not possibly be guilty of such crimes, is shocked to discover the truth. Angela is arrested and taken to a detention centre where she is beaten up by other inmates. She manages to escape from the prison, only to find out that Henrique is about to marry Celeste, the mother of a child born fathered by Guilherme. Upon learning of that development the desperate Angela jumps from the top of the Maksoud Hotel committing suicide, following an attempt to take Celeste's son Emilio as hostage.

When the romance between Lucia Prado and César Toledo comes to an end, the lawyer finally reconciles with Alexandre. Lucia also patches up with Martha, helping her and César to rebuff the attempts of Leda Sampaio who was trying to become the majority shareholder of Tropical Towers. Towards the end of the novela, having finally admitted the real character of Sandrinha, Alexandre ultimately decides to stay with her ex-love of the father. César Toledo and Martha end up reconciling in spite of Martha's past suspicions and César numerous affairs with other women. Following a confrontation with Clara, Martha is forced to realise that her father Otavio Leme was a sexual predator who repeatedly raped a young Clara after he had adopted her from an orphanage. Upon being confronted by César, Otavio was overwhelmed with shame and he asked somebody to sabotage the brakes of his vehicle so that he would die while driving it.

Now César and Alexandre can work on finding out who caused the deadly explosion at the commercial centre. José Clementino is the prime suspect because of his troubled past and his much-publicized animosity towards César Toledo. Many people have witnessed him claiming that he would exact revenge upon César for sending him to jail twenty years ago. However, no solid evidence against Clementino is found on the scene of the crime. While he confesses that he did plan to blow up the Tropical Towers, he is adamant that he did not go ahead with that idea and that somebody else must have triggered the explosives. In his efforts to clear his name, José Clementino has the support of his daughter Shirley as well as that of Clara. Clementino is determined to protect himself from any allegations and even claims that César Toledo himself might have been the mastermind behind the explosion.

Another suspect is Bruno Maia, Martha's confidant and secret lover. Just like Clementino, Bruno holds a long-standing grudge with César, whom he blames for the death of his daughter when she was still a child. Bruno admits to Martha that while he loves her, his hatred for César remains profound and he is determined to bring him down by any means necessary to gain revenge. Martha thus suspects that Bruno may well have set up the explosion at Tropical Towers in order to damage both the business operations and the reputation of her husband.

Meanwhile Clementino believes that the person who holds the key to what actually happened during the explosion is none other than his own father, Agenor. The old man has disappeared and nobody has yet been able to locate him.

==== The End ====
José Clementino is on the run from police, having been sent back to a detention centre after his daughter Sandrinha denounced him for breaking into César Toledo's office at night. He managed to break free from police while attending the wedding of his other daughter Shirley a few weeks earlier. During the wedding ceremony of Henrique and Celeste, Clementino reappears accompanied by his half-brothers and their father Agenor, whom they have been able to track. They request Agenor to tell the story of what truly happened during the explosion of the commercial centre.

Agenor explains that he was indeed involved in such a project and was paid by Ângela Vidal to execute part of the dirty work, using the plans that had been drawn by Clementino. However they had no intention of killing anybody, their plan was only meant to scare people and harm the reputation of César Toledo. One person however got wind of the plan and hijacked it to trigger an earlier explosion which proved to be deadly. That person is none other than José Clementino's own daughter Sandrinha. In spite of the latter's denials she is immediately arrested by police, with several of the wedding guests able to provide testimonies about the role she played on the night of the explosion.

== Cast and episodes ==
Actor	Character	Episodes
Tarcísio Meira	César Toledo	203 eps
Glória Menezes	Marta Leme Toledo	203 eps
Tony Ramos	José Clementino da Silva	202 eps
Maitê Proença	Clara Soares	197 eps
Adriana Esteves	Sandra da Silva (Sandrinha); Villain, responsible for the shopping explosion (Ends in jail)	200 eps
Cláudia Raia	Ângela Vidal; Main Villain (Commits suicide by throwing herself from the top of a building)	201 eps
Edson Celulari	Henrique Leme Toledo	194 eps
Letícia Sabatella	Celeste Brunmer/Leme Toledo	156 eps
Natália do Vale	Lúcia Prado	171 eps
Marcos Palmeira	Alexandre Leme Toledo	199 eps
Stênio Garcia	Bruno Maia	73 eps
Cláudia Jimenez	Balbina Colombo Falcão (Bina)	179 eps
Christiane Torloni	Rafaela Katz (Neusa Maria da Silva); (Killed by Sandrinha)	26 eps
Sílvia Pfeifer	Leda Sampaio / Leila Sampaio (Killed by Sandrinha)	28 eps
Marcello Antony	Guilherme Leme Toledo	30 eps
Juca de Oliveira	Agenor da Silva	58 eps
Cacá Carvalho	Ariovaldo da Silva (Jamanta)	112 eps
Karina Barum	Shirley da Silva	139 eps
Danton Mello	Adriano de Almeida Paes (Chicletinho)	51 eps
Isadora Ribeiro	Vilma Toledo; Villain (Killed by Ângela)	97 eps
Oscar Magrini	Gustinho da Silva / Johnny Percebe	103 eps
Ernani Moraes	Ariclenes da Silva (Boneca)	105 eps
Victor Fasano	Edmundo Falcão	115 eps
Cleyde Yáconis	Diolinda Falcão	120 eps
Carlos Gregório	Paulo de Almeida Paes	27 eps
Liana Duval	Luísa	95 eps
Vanda Lacerda	Eglantine Colombo	17 eps
Etty Fraser	Sarita	92 eps
Irving São Paulo	Gilberto Lobo	7-15 eps
Maria Sílvia	Dirce Lobo	41 eps
Manitou Felipe	Pedro Pacheco	31 eps
Bruno Costa	Marco	32 eps
Carvalhinho	Cláudio	71 eps
Eliane Costa	Luzineide	98 eps
Duda Mamberti	Carlito	67 eps
Cleyde Blota	Josefa Navarro	49 eps
Carlos Henrique Kroeber	Navarro	29 eps
Roberto Lobo	Navarrinho	40 eps
Felipe Rocha	Dino	39 eps
Sthephanie Neves	Tiffany Toledo	84 eps
Caio Graco	Henrique Toledo Júnior	81 eps
Felipe Latgé	Guilherme Leme Toledo Brummer (Guiminha)	42 eps

Special Participation

Actor	Character	Episodes
Berta Loran	Sara Bentes	1 ep
Chico Expedito	Claudionor	2 eps
Patrícia Gordo	José Clementino's wife	1 ep
Beto Bellini	Lover of José Clementino's wife	1 ep
Alexandre Borges	Boyfriend of Ângela	1 ep

== Cast ==
Actor	Character
Tarcísio Meira	César Toledo
Glória Menezes	Marta Leme Toledo
Tony Ramos	José Clementino da Silva
Maitê Proença	Clara Soares
Adriana Esteves	Sandra da Silva (Sandrinha)
Cláudia Raia	Ângela Vidal
Edson Celulari	Henrique Leme Toledo
Letícia Sabatella	Celeste Brunmer/Leme Toledo
Natália do Vale	Lúcia Prado
Marcos Palmeira	Alexandre Leme Toledo
Isadora Ribeiro	Vilma Toledo
Stênio Garcia	Bruno Maia
Cláudia Jimenez	Balbina Colombo Falcão (Bina)
Victor Fasano	Edmundo Falcão
Juca de Oliveira	Agenor da Silva
Karina Barum	Shirley da Silva
Danton Mello	Adriano de Almeida Paes (Chicletinho)
Oscar Magrini	Gustinho da Silva / Johnny Percebe
Ernani Moraes	Ariclenes da Silva (Boneca)
Cacá Carvalho	Ariovaldo da Silva (Jamanta)
Roberto Lopes	Delegate Jorge Machado
Cleyde Yáconis	Diolinda Falcão
Cleyde Blota	Josefa Navarro
Carlos Henrique Kroeber	Cristóvão Navarro
Eliane Costa	Luzineide
Irving São Paulo	Gilberto Lobo
Manitou Felipe	Pacheco
Bruno Costa	Marco
Mário Lago	Padre João Luiz
Liana Duval	Luísa Vidal
Dary Reis	Jaime Pacheco
Roberto Lobo	Navarrinho
Duda Mamberti	Carlito
Etty Fraser	Sarita Teixeira
Carlos Gregório	Paulo de Almeida Paes
Carvalhinho	Cláudio
Maria Sílvia	Dirce
Felipe Rocha	Dino
Sthephanie Neves	Tiffany Toledo
Caio Graco	Henrique Toledo Júnior
Felipe Latgé	Guilherme Leme Toledo Brummer (Guiminha)

Participação Especial

Actor	Character
Christiane Torloni	Rafaela Katz/Neusa Maria da Silva
Sílvia Pfeifer	Leda Sampaio / Leila Sampaio
Marcello Antony	Guilherme Leme Toledo
Vanda Lacerda	Eglantine Colombo
Berta Loran	Sara Bentes
Pedro Paulo Rangel	Pedro Lobo
Maria Lúcia Dahl	Cecilia da Silva
Flávio Migliaccio	Caju
Ronaldo Reis	Aquino
William Vorhees	Pretão
Célia Biar	Terezinha Romano
Ada Chaseliov	Eliane Mauad
Eliane Giardini	Wanda "Wandona"
Andréa Cavalcanti	Odete
Celso Frateschi	Inspector Armando
Beto Simas	Guga
Neusa Maria Faro	Leda
Norma Geraldy	Adriano's Grandmother
Jorge Cherques	Jota
Milhem Cortaz	Bandit
D. Zefa	Laundress
Chico Expedito	Claudionor
Patrícia Gordo	José Clementino's wife
Beto Bellini	Lover of José Clementino's wife
Renato Master	Juiz
Rúbem de Bem	Foreman
Xuxa	Herself
Fausto Silva	Herself
Jorge Fernando	Herself
