= Segundo Sol =

Brazilian telenovela

- Also known as: A Second Chance
- Genre: Telenovela
- Created by: João Emanuel Carneiro
- Directed by: Dennis Carvalho; Maria de Médicis
- Starring: Giovanna Antonelli; Emílio Dantas; Deborah Secco; Adriana Esteves; Vladimir Brichta; Fabrício Boliveira; Chay Suede; Nanda Costa; Letícia Colin; Fabiula Nascimento; Maria Luiza Mendonça; Luisa Arraes; Caco Ciocler; Danilo Mesquita; José de Abreu; Arlete Salles
- Opening theme: "O Segundo Sol" by BaianaSystem
- Country of origin: Brazil
- Original language: Portuguese
- No. of episodes: 155 (135 international version)

Production
- Production location: Salvador, Bahia
- Camera setup: Multi-camera
- Running time: 30–67 minutes
- Production company: Estúdios Globo

Original release
- Network: TV Globo
- Release: 14 May – 9 November 2018

Segundo Sol (English title: A Second Chance) is a Brazilian telenovela produced and broadcast by TV Globo that premiered on 14 May 2018, replacing O Outro Lado do Paraíso, and ended on 9 November 2018, being replaced by O Sétimo Guardião, with a total of 155 episodes. It is created by João Emanuel Carneiro and directed by Dennis Carvalho.

Set in both 1999 and present time, in Bahia, Segundo Sol gives a trajectory of singer, Beto Falcão, who is forced to fake his death in order to save his family from financial turmoil. In his new identity, named Miguel, he meets Luzia, fishmonger and a mother of two, and an estranged wife to a dead beat; they become romantically involved. Karola, Beto's ex-girlfriend and Laureta Bottini, a brothel-keeper, frame Luzia in the murder of her husband and she is forced to flee, leaving her children behind. Nearly two decades later, Luzia returns as Ariella, a DJ and tries to rebuild her life by reuniting with her children, clearing her name, and rekindle her love story with Beto / Miguel.

The show stars Giovanna Antonelli, Adriana Esteves, Emílio Dantas, Deborah Secco, Vladimir Brichta, together with a large ensemble cast.

== Plot ==
Set in Salvador in 1999, in the historic district of Santo Antonio, lives the Falcão family. Beto, one of the four sons of Dodô and Nana, made his fame as a singer of axé, but for about three years he has experienced the bitter taste of ostracism. The family earns their livelihood from the crab bar in the same house where they live, but runs the risk of losing their home because of the mismanagement of Beto's career by his manager and brother Remy, the "black sheep" son. To help pay part of the debt, Beto agrees to perform in Aracaju, when the plane he had planned to take crashes at sea and he is presumed dead. Due to the unexpected nationwide commotion, the singer is convinced by Remy and his girlfriend Karola — with whom his relationship is very shaken — to continue passing off as a deceased man by staying in the fictional island of Boiporã. It is at this moment the troubled Beto meets Luzia (Giovanna Antonelli), a fishwife, abandoned by her husband, fending alone for her young children. The two fall in love and soon make plans for marriage, without her knowing the true identity of Beto, who presents himself as Miguel. Hostage of a large plot orchestrated by Karola and Laureta (Adriana Esteves), the couple ends up separated. They find her ex-husband and he tries to kill Beto but Luzia ends up killing him. Luzia, now a fugitive, flees to Iceland, with the help of Goa (André Dias) where she becomes famous as DJ Ariela.

=== Second phase ===
After nearly 20 years, Luzia returns to try to reunite her shattered family, without imagining that Miguel, her great love that she could not forget, is the famous singer Beto Falcão. Along with his family, Beto maintains to this day the farce of his death and is unhappy with the course that life has taken. He also keeps his love for Luzia alive and goes crazy when he discovers that the fishmonger, now a successful DJ, is in Salvador and will do everything to find her and rekindle their past romances.

== Cast ==
- Giovanna Antonelli as Luzia Batista / Ariella Arlesisla
- Emilio Dantas as Roberto "Beto" Falcão / Miguel
- Deborah Secco as Caroline "Karola" Falcão
- Adriana Esteves as Laureta Botini / Divinéia dos Santos
- Vladimir Brichta as Remildo "Remy" Falcão
- José de Abreu as Dorival "Dodô" Falcão
- Arlete Salles as Nazira "Naná" Falcão
- Fabrício Boliveira as Roberval Santos
- Caco Ciocler as Edgar Athayde
- Maria Luísa Mendonça as Karen Athayde
- Odilon Wagner as Severo Athayde
- Francisco Cuoco as Nestor Maranhão
- Chay Suede as Ícaro Batista
- Luisa Arraes as Manuela Batista
- Danilo Mesquita as Valentim Batista Falcão
- Letícia Colin as Rosa Câmara
- Nanda Costa as Maura Câmara
- Fabiula Nascimento as Maria Cláudia "Cacau" Batista
- Giovanna Lancelloti as Rochelle Athayde
- Armando Babaioff as Ionan Falcão
- Roberta Rodrigues as Doralice
- Danilo Ferreira as Acácio Pereira
- Luis Lobianco as Clóvis Falcão
- Thalita Carauta as Gorete
- André Dias as Groa
- Claudia di Moura as Josefa "Zefa" Santos
- João Acaiabe as Pai Didico
- Roberto Bonfim as Agenor Câmara
- Kelzy Ecard as Eunice "Nice" Câmara
- Gabriela Moreyra as Renata "Renatinha"
- Osmar Silveira as Narciso Rangel
- Pablo Morais as Tomé
- Robertha Portella as Ariadna
- Hugo Moura as Robinson "Robinho"
- Marcelo Augusto
- Carol Fazu as Selma
- Drayson Menezes as Wander
- Narcival Rubens as Galdino Navarro
- Ciro Sales as Du Love
- Ícaro Zulu as Dorival "Doni" Falcão Neto
- Vinicius Nascimento
- Ygor Rodrigues as Tupã
- Ittalo Paixão
- Bia Barros
- Larissa Marques
- Cláudia Lira as Glorinha Tibiriçá

=== Guest cast ===
- Renata Sorrah as Dulce Botini
- Cássia Kis Magro as Claudine Athayde
- Fernando Sampaio
- Tuca Andrada as Juarez Garcia
- Ingra Liberato as Fátima Garcia
- Paulo Borges as Edilei
- Zeca de Abreu as Januária
- Jayme Periard as Vicente
- Thales Miranda as young Ícaro
- Rafaela Brazil as young Manuela
- Daniella Mercury as herself
- Ana Maria Braga as herself
- Fátima Bernardes as herself

== Production ==
João Emanuel Carneiro began developing the series in October 2016. Initially the show was tentatively under the title Da Volta Pra Casa, but was later changed to Segundo Sol. In January 2017 the synopsis was presented to the network and was approved, giving endorsement for the creator to continue developing the story and enter into phase of pre-production for the 2018–19 season. The approval of a telenovela in Bahia was a strategic move, since it was a state where Rede Globo did not reach the top spot for years, second to RecordTV's productions.

=== Filming ===
In October 2017, the set design team was sent to Bahia in search for small villages with preserved natural beauty to be the backdrop of the first phase. Despite the synopsis of the first phase set in Boipeba in Cairu, the production crew decided not use it due lack of infrastructure to carry the equipments, choosing to record the scenes in another city—Caraíva—but the team faced difficulties; the Municipal Environmental Council of Caraíva was against the recordings, fearing that exposing the place at national level could attract an exaggerated tourism and generate degradation of the natural ecosystem. In order to decide the impasse, the council established a referendum, in which 88% of the village population voted against filming the show there.

On 7 December 2017, it was announced that the recordings would take place in Trancoso, a village in Porto Seguro, which had already benefited from the tourism brought by the recording of the DVD, Acústico em Trancoso by Ivete Sangalo in 2016. The two houses used by the protagonists were not scenographic; they were actually built on the beach specifically for recordings and donated to local residents after filming ended. In February 2018, Emilio Dantas, Deborah Secco and Adriana Esteves travelled to Salvador and recorded the first scenes of the telenovela during the 2018 Carnival. In March, besides the fore mentioned three, Giovanna Antonelli, Vladimir Brichta, Arlete Salles, José de Abreu, Fabiula Nascimento, Armando Babaioff and Luis Lobianco also began filming the first phase in Salvador and Trancoso. The city was built in the scenic Estúdios Globo, compiling the houses of the characters, as well as replica of the district of San Antonio.

== Soundtrack ==
=== Volume 1 ===
Segundo Sol — Trilha Sonora da Novela (Nacional), Vol. 1

Soundtrack album by Various artists
- Released: 1 June 2018
- Length: 47:54
- Label: Som Livre

Singles from Segundo Sol — Trilha Sonora da Novela (Nacional), Vol. 1
- 1. "Axé Pelô by Emilio Dantas" Released: 14 May 2018

Segundo Sol: Vol. 1 is the first installment of the series of soundtracks of the telenovela. "Axé Pelô" (released on 14 May 2018), composed by the shows star, Emilio Dantas was specifically produced for the show.

No.	Title	Artist(s)	Length
1.	"O Segundo Sol"	BaianaSystem and Cássia Eller	2:29
2.	"Vem Meu Amor"	Wesley Safadão	3:00
3.	"Beleza Rara"	Thiaguinho	2:51
4.	"Baianidade Nagô"	Maria Gadú	4:24
5.	"O Mais Belo dos Belos"	Alcione	4:27
6.	"Por Amor"	Zé Maria	3:13
7.	"Um Canto de Afoxé para o Bloco do Ilê"	Caetano Veloso, Tom Veloso and Moreno Veloso	2:27
8.	"Afogamento"	Roberta Sá and Gilberto Gil	4:05
9.	"O Que Seria"	Carlinhos Brown	4:19
10.	"Você Passa Eu Acho Graça"	Laila Garin and A Roda	3:31
11.	"Beija-Flor"	Johnny Hooker	3:36
12.	"Mal Acostumada"	Simone & Simaria	2:46
13.	"Beleza Pura"	Dream Team do Passinho	2:12
14.	"Axé Pelô"	Emilio Dantas	3:38
Total length:			47:54

=== Volume 2 ===
Segundo Sol — Trilha Sonora da Novela, Vol. 2

Soundtrack album by Various artists
- Released: 20 July 2018
- Length: 53:00
- Label: Som Livre

Segundo Sol: Vol. 2 is the second installment of the soundtrack of the telenovela, released on 20 July 2018.

No.	Title	Artist(s)	Length
1.	"Swing All the Colors"	I Koko	3:37
2.	"Preciso de Você"	Sandy	3:10
3.	"Tá Amarrado"	OQuadro	3:52
4.	"Say Something"	Justin Timberlake	4:38
5.	"Matter of Time"	Sharon Jones & The Dap-Kings	3:21
6.	"Dueto"	Chico Buarque	3:21
7.	"Me Abraça"	Anavitória	3:04
8.	"Wild Hearts Can't Be Broken"	P!nk	3:18
9.	"The Sky is a Neighborhood"	Foo Fighters	4:06
10.	"Pray"	Sam Smith	3:58
11.	"Ginga"	Iza	3:01
12.	"No Roots"	Alice Merton	3:55
13.	"Peligro"	Gotan Project	4:19
14.	"Rapariga Não"	João Neto & Frederico	2:36
15.	"Rega"	Jammil	2:44
Total length:			53:00

=== Volume 3 ===
Segundo Sol — Trilha Sonora da Novela, Vol. 3

Soundtrack album by Various artists
- Released: 5 September 2018
- Length: 46:29
- Label: Som Livre

Segundo Sol: Vol. 3 is the third installment of the soundtrack of the telenovela, released on 5 September 2018.

No.	Title	Artist(s)	Length
1.	"O Canto da Cidade"	Daniela Mercury	3:23
2.	"Prefixo de Verão"	Teresa Cristina	3:16
3.	"Milla"	Netinho	5:00
4.	"Beautiful Lie"	Republica	3:41
5.	"Take Me Out"	Pierce Brothers	3:45
6.	"De Hombre A Hombre"	Gotan Project	3:24
7.	"Faraó (Divindade do Egito)/Natureza Egípcia"	Margareth Menezes	3:51
8.	"Aquele Frevo Axé"	Gal Costa	3:50
9.	"Honra Ao Rei"	Letieres Leite	8:23
10.	"Cozido Da Patroa"	Solange Almeida	2:45
11.	"Chame Gente"	Armandinho and Trio Elétrico, Dodô E Osmar	3:30
12.	"Porto De Abraçar"	Emílio Dantas	1:41
Total length:			46:29

== Reception ==
=== Ratings ===
Season	Timeslot (BRT/AMT)	Episodes	First aired		Last aired		Avg. viewers (points)
Season	Timeslot (BRT/AMT)	Episodes	Date	Viewers (in points)	Date	Viewers (in points)	Avg. viewers (points)
1	Mon–Sat 9:15 p.m.	155	14 May 2018	35	9 November 2018	41	33.4
