= Canastra Suja =

2016 film directed by Caio Sóh

- Theatrical release poster
- Directed by: Caio Sóh
- Written by: Caio Sóh
- Produced by: Caio Sóh
- Starring: Marco Ricca; Adriana Esteves; Pedro Nercessian; Bianca Bin; Cacá Ottoni; David Junior; Milhem Cortaz
- Music by: Maria Gadú
- Production companies: Mistika, Simtz
- Distributed by: ArtHouse
- Release dates: 29 October 2016 (São Paulo Int'l Film Festival); 21 June 2018
- Running time: 120 minutes
- Country: Brazil
- Language: Portuguese

Canastra Suja (Note: Translates as "dirty run"; it's a term used in the card game of Buraco. See Buraco#Runs for details.) is a Brazilian drama feature film. Directed, written and produced by Caio Sóh, it was released theatrically on 21 June 2018. In August of the same year, the movie was among the 22 candidates to represent Brazil at the competition for the 2019 Academy Award for Best Foreign Language Film, but the Special Commission of Selection (consisting of Bárbara Paz, Lucy Barreto, Jorge Peregrino, Flávio Ramos Tambellini, Jeferson De, João Jardim and Hsu Chien) ended up electing The Great Mystical Circus.

== Plot ==
Batista (Marco Ricca) is a valet at the parking lot of a rich hotel who suffers from alcoholism and lives in the outskirts of Rio de Janeiro with his wife, housewife (Adriana Esteves); and his three children: the oldest one Pedro (Pedro Nercessian), for whom he arranges a job at the hotel's parking garage; Emília (Bianca Bin), a receptionist and secretary for a rich, young doctor; and Rita (Cacá Ottoni), an autistic teenage girl. The film follows the problems faced by the family at home, such as the constant conflicts between Batista and Pedro and Batista's attempts to abuse his daughters when drunk, besides the individual conflicts of all members.

Pedro is ashamed of his father due to his drinking issues and even secretly tags offenses to him with graffiti in their front wall. The father arranges him a job at the parking lot where he words, but one day, one client notices his cellphone is missing and soon the valet team (consisting of Batista, Pedro and a third man) is accused of stealing it. When Pedro refuses to allow his boss to search his bag, even with his father's insistence, he becomes the main suspect and leaves the job, creating a grudge between him and his father. Furthermore, CCTV footage shows Batista parking the client's car and taking way too long to get out of it. The parking lot's manager immediately deduces he is the thief and fires him, causing Batista to worsen his alcoholism. Later, the client reveals he's found his cellphone at home.

After these events, Pedro asks his sister's boyfriend Tatu (David Junior) for a job so he can move out of his parents' house. Tatu invites him to join a team of young males who are paid to practice active anal sex with rich men. Tatu takes him to his boss's Celso (Milhem Cortaz) mansion, and the pimp introduces him to his clients. Pedro soon catches the attention of Donato (Remo Rocha), one of Celso's most regular clients, who invites him to Armação dos Búzios. Still too insecure and shy, Pedro turns the invitation down, but goes to a room in the mansion with Donato. Too nervous to have sex, Pedro asks Donato to end their date, but he reacts aggressively. The two fight, and Pedro injures Donato. An infuriated Celso reprehends and threatens Pedro and Tatu, but one of his clients recognizes Pedro from the hotel and rescues him, allowing him to go back to his parents' house.

Meanwhile, Maria has an affair with Tatu, who visits her regularly at home to sell her steroids and have sex. Maria once even ties Rita to her bed so she can have undisturbed sex.

Emília, on the other hand, also maintains a second relationship. Her lover is her own boss, a rich doctor. One day, as she takes a shower with Rita, she checks a pregnancy test that turns positive and cries. Maria finds the test among the thrash and pressures Emília to tell her whether the father is Tatu ou her boss, but she dodges her questions.

Near the end of the film, Batista returns home after another night of drinking and finds his family discussing the pregnancy. Emília reveals the test was not hers, but Rita's, and the family immediately kicks Batista out. Later, Emília finds out Batista is not the father. Sometime later, the family is seen reunited and celebrating. Emília holds a black newborn child in her arms, suggesting the one who raped Rita was Tatu.

== Cast ==
- Marco Ricca as Batista Roberto dos Santos
- Adriana Esteves as Maria
- Pedro Nercessian as Pedro
- Bianca Bin as Emília
- Cacá Ottoni as Rita
- David Junior as Tatu
- João Vancini as Dr. Lucas
- Emílio Orciollo Netto as Augusto
- Milhem Cortaz as Celso
- Marcello Melo Jr. as Wellington
- Bruno Padilha as Wilson
- Gustavo Novaes as Cicero
- Remo Rocha as Donato
- Lana Rhodes as Jackie
- Vinicius Marquez as Marcio
- Vinícius Bolinho as André
- Renato Góes as an actor in the party

== Music ==
=== Soundtrack ===
- Maria Gadú

== Reception ==
=== Accolades ===
Year	Award	Category	Nomination	Result	Ref.
2016	11º Fest Aruanda	Best Actor	Marco Ricca	Won	
2016	11º Fest Aruanda	Best Screenplay	Caio Sóh	Won	
2016	11º Fest Aruanda	Best Supporting Actor	Pedro Nercessian	Won	
2017	LA Film Festival	Best Supporting Actor	Pedro Nercessian	Won	
2017	LA Film Festival	Best Actor	Marco Ricca	Won	
2017	LA Film Festival	Best Director	Caio Sóh	Won	
2017	LA Film Festival	Best Film	Canastra Suja	Won	
2017	LA Film Festival	Best Actress	Cacá Ottoni	Nominated	
