= Bom Sucesso (TV series) =

- Also known as: A Life Worth Living
- Genre: Telenovela; Comedy drama
- Created by: Rosane Svartman; Paulo Halm
- Written by: Charles Peixoto; Claudia Sardinha; Fabrício Santiago; Felipe Cabral; Isabela Aquino
- Directed by: Luiz Henrique Rios
- Starring: Grazi Massafera; Antônio Fagundes; Rômulo Estrela; David Junior; Ingrid Guimarães; Fabiula Nascimento; Armando Babaioff; Sheron Menezzes; Jonas Bloch; Lúcio Mauro Filho; Rafael Infante; Arthur Sales; Helena Fernandes; Eduardo Galvão; Gabriela Moreyra
- Theme music composer: Cartola
- Opening theme: "O Sol Nascerá" by Teresa Cristina and Zeca Pagodinho
- Country of origin: Brazil
- Original language: Portuguese
- No. of episodes: 155 (120 International version)

Production
- Production locations: Rio de Janeiro, Brazil
- Camera setup: Multi-camera
- Running time: 50 minutes
- Production company: Estúdios Globo

Original release
- Network: Rede Globo
- Release: 29 July 2019 – 24 January 2020

Bom Sucesso (English: A Life Worth Living) is a Brazilian telenovela produced and broadcast by Rede Globo. It premiered on 29 July 2019, replacing Verão 90, and ended on 24 January 2020, being replaced by Salve-se Quem Puder.

It stars Grazi Massafera, Rômulo Estrela, David Junior, Antônio Fagundes, Ingrid Guimarães, Fabiula Nascimento, Armando Babaioff and Sheron Menezzes in the main roles.

== Plot ==
Paloma (Grazi Massafera), is a seamstress who raised her three children alone: Alice (Bruna Inocencio), Gabriela (Giovanna Coimbra) and Peter (João Bravo). Paloma creates the costumes for Unidos de Bom Sucesso, a samba school. Her world turns upside down when she receives the wrong test results that confirm that she only has six months to live, which makes her do everything she never had the courage to do, including sleeping with a stranger, Marcos (Rômulo Estrela), who falls in love with her. Upon discovering that she received the wrong test results, Paloma decides to meet the man who does have six months to live and comes across Alberto (Antônio Fagundes), a millionaire who never valued his family. Despite opposite personalities, the two form a friendship that takes them on a journey of discovery: she through books and he through the pleasures of life and sleeping feelings, including reliving a love of the past with Vera (Ângela Vieira).

== Cast ==
=== Main ===
- Grazi Massafera as Paloma da Silva
- Rômulo Estrela as Marcos Prado Monteiro
- David Junior as Ramon Madeira
- Antônio Fagundes as Alberto Prado Monteiro
- Ingrid Guimarães as Silvana Nolasco
- Fabiula Nascimento as Mariana "Nana" Prado Monteiro
- Armando Babaioff as Diogo Cabral
- Sheron Menezzes as Gisele
- Lúcio Mauro Filho as Mário
- Jonas Bloch as Eric Feitosa
- Gabriel Contente as Vicente Machado
- Giovanna Coimbra as Gabriela da Silva
- Helena Fernandes as Eugênia Machado
- Eduardo Galvão as Dr. Roger Machado
- Mariana Molina as Evelyn
- Arthur Sales as Felipe
- Rafael Infante as Pablo Sanches
- Gabriela Moreyra as Francisca
- Antônio Carlos Bernardes as Leonel "Léo" Madeira
- Yasmin Gomlevsky as Thaíssa
- Felipe Haiut as Jefferson
- Bruna Inocencio as Alice da Silva
- Gabrielle Joie as Michelly
- Anderson Müller as Antônio Carlos da Silva
- Carla Cristina Cardoso as Lucimeire "Lulu" da Silva
- Stella Freitas as Terezinha Vieira
- Romeu Evaristo as Fabrício Vieira
- Diego Montez as Willian
- Daniel Warren as Jorginho
- Elam Lima as Zeca
- Alexandra Martins as Leila
- Jorge Lucas as Dr. Mauri
- Guti Fraga as Father Paulo
- Lana Guelero as Glória Diniz
- Patrícia Costa as Esther
- Shirley Cruz as Gláucia
- Rafael Oliveira as Jeremias
- Caio Cabral as Patrick
- Igor Fernandez as Luan Diniz
- Lucas Leto as Waguinho
- Nathalia Altenbernd as Jeniffer
- Ícaro Amado as Pedro Santos
- Felipe Coutinho as José Bial
- Thaís Garayp as Bezinha
- Ju Colombo as Elomar
- Rosana Dias as Cláudia
- Marcelo Flores as Batista
- Alessandro Moussa as Marcondes
- João Bravo as Peter da Silva
- Valentina Vieira as Sofia Prado Monteiro

=== Guest stars ===
- Isabella Scherer as Young Paloma
- David Reis as Young Ramon
- Rhaisa Batista as Marie
- Edmilson Barros as Dr. Cézar Castriotto
- Antônio Pedro as Agripino
- Bruna Aiiso as Toshi Noshimura
- Mariana Alves as Lorena
- Cristiano Felício as himself

== Production ==
The telenovela was approved with the title Chuvas de Verão, then in July 2018, it had its title changed to Bom Sucesso, as a reference to the neighborhood where the plot takes place. In February 2019, the title was once again changed this time to Doce Deleite, however the title was later reverted to Bom Sucesso. In March 2019, Globo took advantage of the samba school parades in Sambadrome Marquês de Sapucaí to film scenes for the telenovela. Filming officially began on 6 May 2019, and concluded in January 2020.

== Soundtrack ==
=== Volume 1 ===
Bom Sucesso: Vol. 1

Soundtrack album by Various artists
- Released: 18 October 2019
- Length: 42:04
- Label: Som Livre

Bom Sucesso Vol. 1 is the first soundtrack of the telenovela, released on 18 October 2019 by Som Livre.

No.	Title	Artist(s)	Length
1.	"O Sol Nascerá"	Teresa Cristina & Zeca Pagodinho	2:38
2.	"Eu Mereço Ser Feliz"	Mumuzinho	3:14
3.	"Na Correria"	Luciana Mello	2:48
4.	"Coração Feliz"	Ana Clara	3:35
5.	"Onde Anda Você"	Mart'nália	3:16
6.	"Só Pra Lembrar"	Zélia Duncan & Dani Black	4:16
7.	"Lucky Man"	Glen Hansard	4:43
8.	"Deixa Eu Te Amar"	Duda Beat	2:51
9.	"Um Certo Alguém"	Ludmilla	2:33
10.	"Brisa"	Iza	2:30
11.	"Muleke Brasileiro"	Gloria Groove	2:42
12.	"Feelings"	John Newman	3:01
13.	"Preach"	John Legend	3:57
Total length:			42:04

=== Volume 2 ===
Bom Sucesso: Vol. 2

Soundtrack album by Various artists
- Released: 22 November 2019
- Length: 41:21
- Label: Som Livre

Bom Sucesso Vol. 2 is the first soundtrack of the telenovela, released on 22 November 2019 by Som Livre.

No.	Title	Artist(s)	Length
1.	"Um Certo Alguém"	Lulu Santos	3:33
2.	"Amor Pra Recomeçar"	Natiruts	3:27
3.	"Arte"	Malía	2:51
4.	"Sonho Meu"	Miranda	2:56
5.	"Mi Persona Favorita"	Alejandro Sanz & Camila Cabello	3:50
6.	"Dead In The Water"	James Gillespie	3:20
7.	"Deitada Nessa Cama"	Tiago Iorc	4:06
8.	"Juntos"	Paula Fernandes & Luan Santana	3:23
9.	"Falling Like the Stars"	James Arthur	3:30
10.	"Someone You Loved"	Lewis Capaldi	3:01
11.	"Somebody Special"	Nina Nesbitt	3:19
12.	"Black and Blu"	Gary Clark Jr.	4:05
Total length:			41:21

== Ratings ==
Inheriting the high ratings of Verão 90, Bom Sucesso debuted at 31.5 points, making it the second largest audience of a first chapter since Cheias de Charme. The second chapter maintained the high ratings and recorded 32 points.

Season	Timeslot (BRT/AMT)	Episodes	First aired		Last aired		Avg. viewers (points)
Season	Timeslot (BRT/AMT)	Episodes	Date	Viewers (in points)	Date	Viewers (in points)	Avg. viewers (points)
1	Mon–Sat 7:30 p.m.	155	29 July 2019	31	24 January 2020	31	28.80
