= Dalva e Herivelto: uma Canção de Amor =

- Also known as: Songs of Betrayal
- Genre: Drama
- Created by: Maria Adelaide Amaral
- Directed by: Dennis Carvalho
- Starring: Adriana Esteves; Fábio Assunção; Maria Fernanda Cândido; Thiago Fragoso
- Country of origin: Brazil
- Original language: Portuguese
- No. of seasons: 1
- No. of episodes: 4

Original release
- Network: Rede Globo
- Release: January 4 – January 8, 2010

Dalva e Herivelto: uma Canção de Amor (English: Songs of Betrayal) is a 2010 Brazilian miniseries created by Maria Adelaide Amaral and directed by Dennis Carvalho. It was produced and aired by Rede Globo.

The series stars Adriana Esteves and Fábio Assunção in the roles of Dalva de Oliveira and Herivelto Martins respectively. Songs of Betrayal received two nominations for the 39th International Emmy Awards.

== Plot ==
Protagonists of an intense and passionate relationship, Dalva and Herivelto live the duality of a perfect match on their artistic life and a complete misadventure in their personal lives. While, professionally, Herivelto is a dedicated and concerned partner, in their private life he drives Dalva crazy, causing her to drink away her jealousy.

Their routine of fights and reconciliations becomes even more complicated when Herivelto falls in love with Lourdes, who he intends to marry. However, to accomplish this union, besides leaving Dalva, he must give up the musical partnership that has brought them great success.

== Cast ==
Actors	Character
Adriana Esteves	Dalva de Oliveira
Fábio Assunção	Herivelto Martins
Maria Fernanda Cândido	Lurdes Nura Torelly
Thiago Fragoso	Pery Ribeiro
Denise Weinberg	Alice de Oliveira
Emílio de Mello	Benedito Lacerda
Leona Cavalli	Margot
Fernando Eiras	Francisco Alves
Fafy Siqueira	Dercy Gonçalves
Yaçanã Martins	Sílvia Torelly
Jandir Ferrari	David Nasser
Cláudia Netto	Linda Batista
Thiago Mendonça	Billy
Soraya Ravenle	Emilinha Borba
Nando Cunha	Grande Otelo
Rita Elmôr	Marlene
Marcelo Laham	César de Alencar
Leonardo Carvalho	Dorival
Maurício Xavier	Nilo Chagas
Mayana Neiva	Conceição Torelly
Jackson Costa	Herculano
Fernanda Cury	Yaçanã Martins
Luciana Fregolente	Dircinha Batista
Pablo Bellini	Rick Valdez
Daniela Fontan	Edith
Janaína Prado	Lila de Oliveira
Luiz Araújo	Nacib
Adriana Salles	Nair
Larissa Manoela	Dalva de Oliveira (child)

== Repercussion ==
=== Ratings point ===
Episode	Ratings
#1	29 points
#2	28 points
#3	30 points
#4	29 points
#5	31 points

- His overall average was 29.4 points. Sum of ratings of all chapters divided by the total number of chapters (five).

=== Awards ===
2011 International Emmy Awards

- Best Actress for Adriana Esteves (Nom)
- Best Actor for Fábio Assunção (Nom)
