= Fábio Assunção =

Brazilian actor (born 1971)

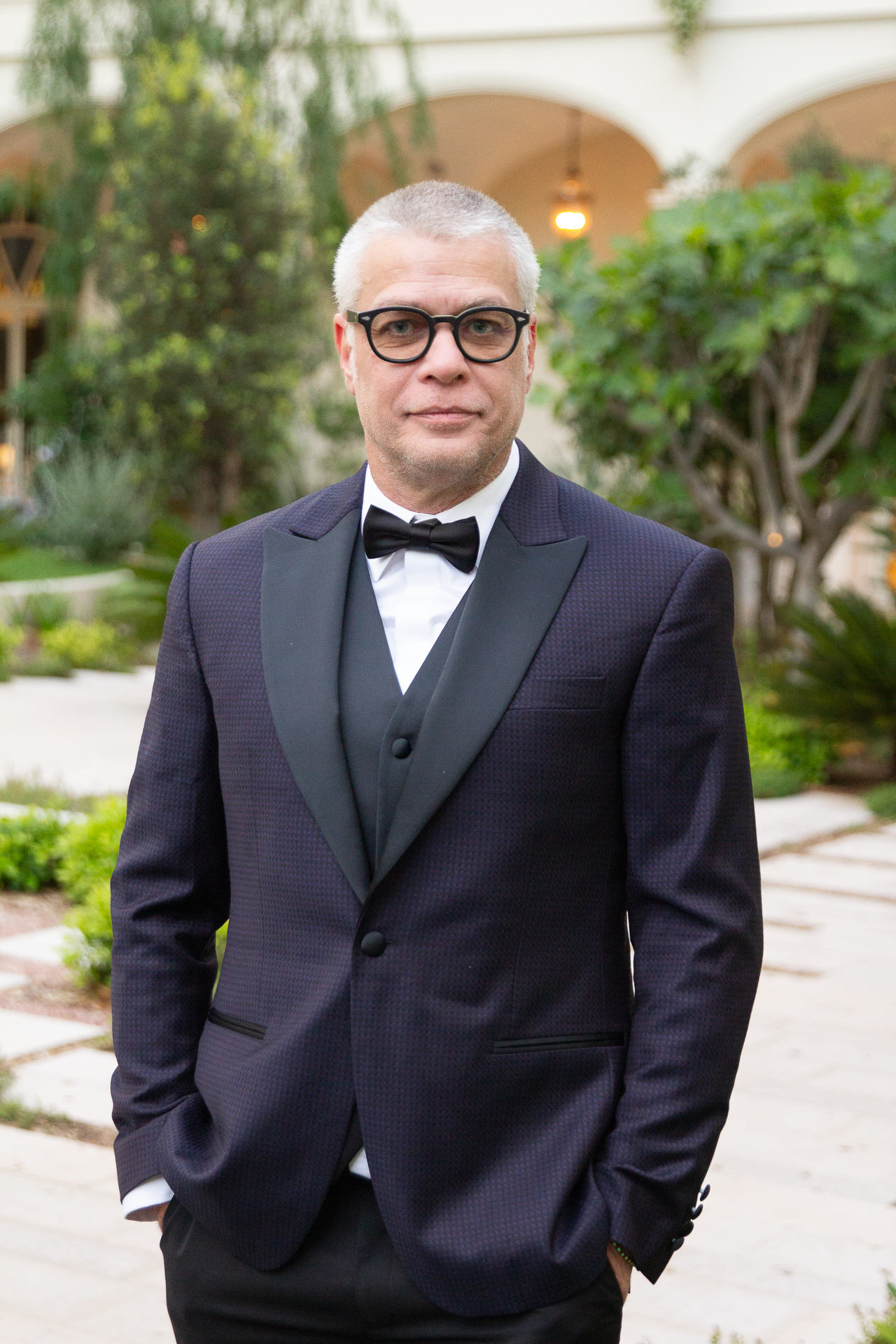
- Assunção in 2024
- Born: 10 August 1971 (age 54); São Paulo, Brazil
- Occupation: Actor
- Years active: 1990–present
- Height: 5 ft 9.5 in (1.77 m)
- Political party: PT (since 2017)
- Spouse: Ana Verena (m. 2020)
- Children: 2

Fábio Assunção Pinto (Portuguese: [ˈfabiu asũˈsɐ̃w̃]; born 10 August 1971) is a Brazilian actor.

In 2011, he was nominated for the International Emmy Award for Best Actor for his role in the miniseries Songs of Betrayal (Dalva e Herivelto: uma Canção de Amor).

== Early life ==
Born in São Paulo, Brazil. He took piano lessons for two and a half years, after classical guitar, folk, singing and choir in his childhood. When he was only 15 years old, knowing how to play guitar and piano, he even started a band called Delta T, but the dream ended up lacking money and time to practice.

Fábio started university and went to study advertising, until one day he saw an announcement of a theater course at the Fundação das Artes in São Caetano do Sul, which he decided to do. That was the beginning of a brilliant career. A week after taking his resume to TV Globo and being chosen for a test, he was already recording Meu Bem, Meu Mal, his first soap opera. Subsequently, several other works followed, becoming one of Gilberto Braga's favorite actors.

== Personal life ==
Assunção is a Spiritist. In 2017 after new drug problems, he received support from Rede Globo for treatment of addiction in Argentina. In the same year, he joined the Workers' Party.

== Filmography ==
=== Television ===
Year	Title	Character
1990	Meu Bem, Meu Mal	Marco Antônio Venturini
1991	Vamp	Felipe Ramos Rocha (Lipe)
1992	De Corpo e Alma	Caio Pastore
1993	Sonho Meu	Jorge Candeias de Sá
1994	Pátria Minha	Rodrigo Laport
1995	Você Decide	Episode: "Agora ou Nunca"
1996	O Rei do Gado	Marcos Mezenga
1997	A Comédia da Vida Privada	Marcelo / César
1997	Por Amor	Marcelo de Barros Motta
1999	Força de um Desejo	Inácio Silveira Sobral
2001	Os Maias	Carlos Eduardo da Maia
2001	Brava Gente	Cid (Episode: "A Grã-Fina de Copacabana")
2002	Coração de Estudante	Eduardo Feitosa
2003	Celebridade	Renato Mendes
2003	Os Normais	Leandro (Episode; "Querer é Poder")
2003	A Grande Família	Mauricio Episodes: "Quem Ama Não Casa", "O Troco" e "Eu Vou Tirar Você Deste Lugar"
2004	Casseta & Planeta, Urgente	Himself
2005	Mad Maria	Dr. Richard Finnegan
2006	Belíssima	Marcelo Assumpção (Special participation)
2006	Copas de Mel	Salvador
2006	JK	João César
2007	Paraíso Tropical	Daniel Bastos
2008	Negócio da China	Heitor Alonso
2010	Dalva e Herivelto - Uma Canção de Amor	Herivelto Martins
2010	S.O.S. Emergência	Edgar
2010	Clandestinos: o Sonho Começou	Himself
2011–2015	Tapas & Beijos	Jorge
2011	Ti Ti Ti	Fernando Flores (participação especial)
2012	As Brasileiras	Pablo Ponti (Episode: A Sexóloga de Floripa)
2015	Totalmente Demais	Arthur Carneiro de Alcântara
2018	Onde Nascem os Fortes	Ramiro Curió
2021	Onde Está Meu Coração	Dr. David Meireles
2022–2023	Todas as Flores	Humberto Albuquerque
2023	The End	Ciro Alcântara de Moraes
2024	Mania de Você	Alfredo
2024–present	Garota do Momento	Juliano Alencar
