= Amor de Mãe =

Brazilian telenovela

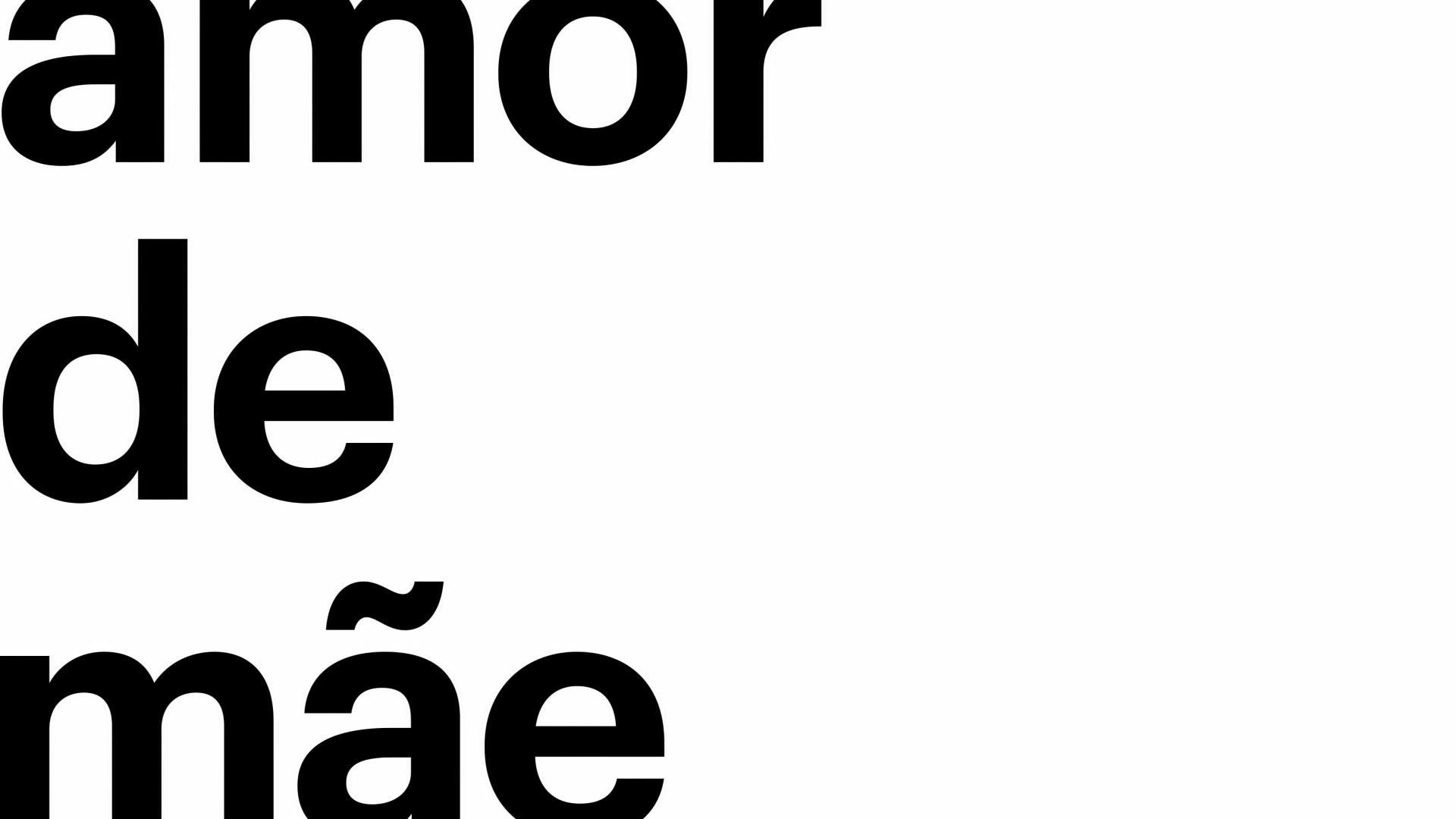
- Also known as: A Mother's Love
- Genre: Telenovela
- Created by: Manuela Dias
- Written by: Mariana Mesquita; Roberto Vitorino; Walter Daguerre
- Directed by: José Luiz Villamarim
- Starring: Regina Casé; Adriana Esteves; Taís Araújo; Isis Valverde; Humberto Carrão; Chay Suede; Irandhir Santos; Juliano Cazarré; Vladimir Brichta; Murilo Benício; Nanda Costa
- Opening theme: "É" by Gonzaguinha
- Composers: Eduardo Queiroz; Bibi Cavalcante
- Country of origin: Brazil
- Original language: Portuguese
- No. of seasons: 1
- No. of episodes: 125 (115 International version)

Production
- Cinematography: Walter Carvalho
- Camera setup: Single-camera
- Production company: Estúdios Globo

Original release
- Network: TV Globo
- Release: 25 November 2019 – 9 April 2021

Amor de Mãe (English: A Mother's Love) is a Brazilian telenovela produced and broadcast by TV Globo, from 25 November 2019 to 9 April 2021. The telenovela is written by Manuela Dias, with Mesquita, Roberto Vitorino and Walter Daguerre as co-writers. José Luiz Villamarim serves as director.

It stars Regina Casé, Adriana Esteves and Taís Araújo as three women from different social backgrounds who live their own dilemmas as mothers. Isis Valverde, Humberto Carrão, Chay Suede, Irandhir Santos, Juliano Cazarré, Vladimir Brichta and Murilo Benício also star in supporting roles.

In March 2020, the telenovela went on hiatus after production was halted during the COVID-19 pandemic in Brazil. Filming resumed on 10 August 2020, following strict protocols, while new episodes aired from 15 March to 9 April 2021.

In 2022, the show was nominated for the International Emmy Award for Best Telenovela.

== Plot ==
Lurdes (Regina Casé), Vitória (Taís Araújo) and Thelma (Adriana Esteves) are three women from different social classes that live their dilemmas as mothers. Lurdes is a struggling woman who had four children: Magno, Ryan, Érica, and Domênico, who was sold at the age of 2 by her ex-husband to child trafficker Kátia (Vera Holtz). Knowing that Domênico was sent to Rio de Janeiro, Lurdes decides to go look for him with the rest of her children and, on the way, she finds the orphan Camila (Jessica Ellen), whom she decides to raise. Vitória is a 45-year-old lawyer who has been unable to get pregnant, so she decides to adopt a child. While waiting for her adopted son to arrive, she meets Davi (Vladimir Brichta). Vitória spends the night with him and is surprised to discover that she is pregnant. Thelma has been a widow for more than 20 years and is overprotective of her son Danilo (Chay Suede). When Danilo was a child he survived a fire that killed his father, thanks to his mother who saved him. Thelma's life changes when she discovers that she has an incurable brain aneurysm. She decides to make a list of things she wants to do before dying, but all the wishes on her list involve Danilo, who does not know about the disease and wants to have distance from his mother because he feels suffocated. Throughout the story, the three women will discover a bond that will connect their lives forever.

== Series overview ==
Phase	Episodes	Originally released	
Phase	Episodes	First released	Last released
1	102	25 November 2019	21 March 2020
2	23	15 March 2021	9 April 2021

== Cast ==
- Regina Casé as Lurdes dos Santos Silva
- Adriana Esteves as Thelma Nunes Viana
- Taís Araújo as Vitória Amorim
- Isis Valverde as Betina Torres da Nóbrega
- Humberto Carrão as Sandro Amorim Camargo
- Chay Suede as Danilo Lopes Viana
- Irandhir Santos as Álvaro da Nóbrega
- Juliano Cazarré a Magno dos Santos Silva
- Arieta Corrêa as Leila Moreira dos Santos
- Vladimir Brichta as Davi Moretti
- Murilo Benício as Raul Camargo
- Nanda Costa as Érica dos Santos Silva
- Jéssica Ellen as Camila dos Santos
- Thiago Martins as Ryan dos Santos Silva
- Érika Januza as Marina Castro
- Malu Galli as Maria Lídia Camargo
- Letícia Lima as Estela Teixeira
- Tuca Andrada as Belizário Lacerda
- Camila Márdila as Amanda Crespo
- Maria as Verena Ovisco
- Magali Biff as Nicete Torres
- Enrique Diaz as Durval Barbosa
- Nanego Lira as José de Oliveira
- Débora Lamm as Miranda Amorim Junqueira
- Milhem Cortaz as Dr. Matias Junqueira
- Isabel Teixeira as Jane D'Ávila
- Clarissa Kiste as Natália Amorim
- Ana Flavia Cavalcanti as Miriam Amaral
- Clarissa Pinheiro as Maria da Penha Moreira "Penha"
- Douglas Silva as Marconi
- Alejandro Claveaux as Tales Paiva
- Giulio Lopes as Miguel Moretti
- Duda Batsow as Carolina "Carol" Amorim Barbosa
- WJ as Edvaldo Lopes "Garnizé"
- Dora Freind as Loyane Barreto
- Dida Camero as Eunice Matos Brandão
- Rodolfo Vaz as Nuno
- Nando Brandão as Lucas Gonçalves
- Susanna Kruger as Osana Barreto
- Gustavo Novaes as Treinador Samuel
- MC Cabelinho as Diogo Barreto "Farula"/"MC Farula"
- Aldene Abreu as Dayse das Chagas
- Xamã as Phanton
- Alex Patrício as Iuri Porto
- Tobias Carrieres as Nivaldo Machado
- Cacá Ottoni as Joana de Sá
- Beatrice Sayd as Edilene Reis
- Clara Galinari as Brenda Moreira dos Santos
- Pedro Guilherme Rodrigues as Tiago Amorim
- Gabriel Palhares as Nicolas Amorim Junqueira
- Gianlucca Mauad as Tomás Amorim Junqueira

=== Guest cast ===
- Vera Holtz as Kátia Matos Brandão
- Lucy Alves as Young Lurdes dos Santos Silva
- Daniel Ribeiro as Jandir Silva
- Luiz Carlos Vasconcelos as Januário Silva
- Júlio Andrade as Sinésio Viana
- Guilherme Hamacek as Benjamim Ferraz Moretti
- Rodrigo García as Vicente Novaes
- Fabrício Boliveira as Paulo
- Filipe Duarte as Gabriel "Gabo" Garcez
- Mariana Nunes as Rita Pereira Moura
- Antônio Benício as Vinícius Camargo
- Paulo Gabriel as Genilson Torres
- Dan Ferreira as Wesley Madureira
- Andrea Dantas as Fátima Bernardino
- Luísa Sonza as Mel
- Anitta as Sabrina
- Mouhamed Harfouch as Daniel Vilanova Hidalgo
- Léo Rosa as César
- Letícia Pedro as Ive Gonzales
- Cláudio Gabriel as Detetive Clóvis Benemério
- Roberta Gualda as Silvânia
- Marcelo Escorel as Dr. Quintela
- Gabriel Kaufmann as Fabiano
- Letícia Isnard as Tracy
- Fábio Lago as Carlinhos Novaes
- Joelson Medeiros as Silas
- Roberto Frota as Seu Onofre
- Cinira Camargo as Tânia Matos Brandão
- Zezita de Matos as Maria dos Santos
- Lana Guelero as Celeste
- Ângela Rabelo as Mariluz Novaes
- Dhonata Augusto as Vapor
- Paulo Verlings as Fantón
- Guilherme Duarte as Mário Sérgio
- Kacau Gomes as Lucimara
- Charles Fricks as Dr. Ronaldo
- Thelmo Fernandes as Capitão Bruno
- Inez Viana as Sílvia
- Ravel Andrade as Elias
- Arnaldo Marques as Dr. Gilberto
- Raquel Fabbri as Lucélia
- Saulo Segreto as Capitão Jorge
- Wilson Rabelo as Eudésio
- Maureen Miranda as Sheila
- Zemanuel Piñero as Agenor Crespo
- Mariah da Penha as Dona Clemildes
- Marcos Dioli as Nelson
- Démick Lopes as Guará
- Isis Pessino as Cássia
- Séfora Rangel as Alaíde
- Susanna Kruger as Osana
- Jack Berraquero as Jader
- Alexandre David as Dalto
- Ruan Aguiar as Adriel
- Jeniffer Dias as Salete
- Gabriel Reif as Jhonatan
- Márcio Machado as Dr. Xavier
- Tiago Homci as Bombeiro
- Aisha Moura as Aluna de Camila
- Fabiana Schunk as Dançarina de tango
- Gabriella Vergani as Young Thelma
- Izabela Prado as Young Vitória
- Stella Rabello as Young Kátia
- Daniel Carvalho as Young Sinésio
- Catarina de Carvalho as Young Miranda
- Fernanda Lasevitch as Young Jane
- Priscilla Vilela as Young Celeste
- Eros Lázari as Child Domênico
- João Guilherme Fonseca as Child Magno
- Pietro Buannafina as Child Ryan
- Luciano Huck as Himself
- Cissa Guimarães as Herself
- Zeca Camargo as Himself
- Lázaro Ramos as narrator
- Eliane Giardini as Vera
- Olívia Araújo as Zenaide

== Production ==
Dias has mentioned that both her mother, actress Sônia Dias, and her daughter Helena, inspired her in part to write Amor de Mãe. She delivered the synopsis of the plot in the first semester of 2017, and on 19 June of that year the project was approved to enter the queue of 9pm telenovelas for 2019. Originally the plot would be called Troia, in reference to the mythological city, but the name was changed to Amor de Mãe (Mother's Love) to better express the central plot around the three mothers. Filming of the telenovela began in August 2019. Amor de Mãe was the first production to be filmed in Globo's newly opened MG4 studios. On 16 March 2020, it was announced that filming of the telenovela was suspended indefinitely due to the COVID-19 pandemic; the final episode of the first part would air on 21 March 2020. Reruns of previous telenovelas currently occupy its timeslot. Filming resumed on 10 August 2020, with work pace being reduced to comply with safety guidelines. 23 episodes are planned to be filmed and will premiere in 2021. Part of the changes in production include actors arriving to the recording studios with their makeup and costumes ready. Those who need to travel for the studios are now staying in a hotel. Because of these changes, some actors were eliminated from the production, such as Alejandro Claveaux who portrayed Tales.

== Soundtrack ==
=== Volume 1 ===
Amor de Mãe: Vol. 1

Soundtrack album by Various artists
- Released: 7 February 2020
- Length: 59:10
- Label: Som Livre

Amor de Mãe Vol. 1 is the first soundtrack of the telenovela, released on 7 February 2020 by Som Livre.

No.	Title	Artist(s)	Length
1.	"É"	Gonzaguinha	5:00
2.	"Acreditar"	Beth Carvalho	3:07
3.	"Libertação"	Elza Soares & BaianaSystem	4:19
4.	"Garota Nacional"	Skank	5:17
5.	"Sentimental"	Los Hermanos	5:09
6.	"O Estrangeiro"	Caetano Veloso	6:15
7.	"Hier encore"	Charles Aznavour	2:23
8.	"Minha Mãe"	Gal Costa ft. Maria Bethânia	4:40
9.	"Medo Bobo"	Rubel	3:18
10.	"Acabou Chorare"	Novos Baianos	4:13
11.	"Onde Estará o Meu Amor"	Maria Bethânia	3:31
12.	"Bloodfood"	Alt-J	4:09
13.	"O Que É Que Há"	Gal Costa	3:45
14.	"Tô Te Querendo"	ÀTTØØXXÁ, Omulu & Luedji Luna	2:50
15.	"Bixinho (Lux & Troia Remix)"	Duda Beat	3:27
Total length:			59:10

=== Volume 2 ===
Amor de Mãe: Vol. 2

Soundtrack album by Various artists
- Released: 28 February 2020
- Length: 62:52
- Label: Som Livre

Amor de Mãe Vol. 2 is the second soundtrack of the telenovela, released on 28 February 2020 by Som Livre.

No.	Title	Artist(s)	Length
1.	"Conselho"	Almir Guineto	3:19
2.	"É Preciso dar um Jeito, Meu Amigo"	Erasmo Carlos	3:47
3.	"Mulher do Fim do Mundo"	Elza Soares	4:37
4.	"As Canções que Você Fez pra Mim"	Maria Bethânia	3:44
5.	"Meu Mundo é Hoje (Eu Sou Assim)"	Paulinho da Viola	3:08
6.	"Ela"	Tim Bernardes	3:01
7.	"Haja o Que Houver"	Madredeus	4:33
8.	"Cold World"	Macy Gray	3:06
9.	"O'Children"	Nick Cave & The Bad Seeds	6:51
10.	"Hurricane"	Bob Dylan	8:32
11.	"Real Love Baby"	Father John Misty	3:09
12.	"Brother"	Jorge Ben Jor	2:54
13.	"Não Me Arrependo"	Caetano Veloso	4:08
14.	"Palavras no Corpo"	Gal Costa	3:59
15.	"Alvorada"	Cartola	2:38
Total length:			62:52

== Reception ==
=== Ratings ===
Season	Timeslot (BRT/AMT)	Episodes	First aired		Last aired		Avg. viewers (points)
Season	Timeslot (BRT/AMT)	Episodes	Date	Viewers (points)	Date	Viewers (points)	Avg. viewers (points)
1	Mon–Sat 9:15 p.m.	125	25 November 2019	35	9 April 2021	35	30.8

=== Awards and nominations ===
Year	Award	Category	Nominated	Result	Ref.
2020	Prêmio APCA de Televisão	Dramaturgy	Manuela Dias	Nominated	
2020	Prêmio APCA de Televisão	Best Actress	Regina Casé	Nominated	
2020	Prêmio APCA de Televisão	Best Actor	Chay Suede	Nominated	
2020	Prêmio Contigo! Online	Best Telenovela	Manuela Dias	Nominated	
2020	Prêmio Contigo! Online	Best Actress in a Telenovela	Adriana Esteves	Nominated	
2020	Prêmio Contigo! Online	Best Actress in a Telenovela	Regina Casé	Nominated	
2020	Prêmio Contigo! Online	Best Actress in a Telenovela	Taís Araújo	Nominated	
2020	Prêmio Contigo! Online	Best Actor in a Telenovela	Chay Suede	Won	
2020	Prêmio Contigo! Online	Best Supporting Actress in a Telenovela or Series	Isis Valverde	Nominated	
2020	Prêmio Contigo! Online	Best Supporting Actress in a Telenovela or Series	Jéssica Ellen	Nominated	
2020	Prêmio Contigo! Online	Best Supporting Actor in a Telenovela or Series	Irandhir Santos	Nominated	
2020	Prêmio Contigo! Online	Best Young Actor/Actress	Clara Galinari	Nominated	
2020	Prêmio Área VIP	Best Telenovela	Manuela Dias	Nominated	
2020	Prêmio Área VIP	Best Actress	Adriana Esteves	Nominated	
2020	Prêmio Área VIP	Best Actress	Regina Casé	Nominated	
2020	Prêmio Área VIP	Best Actress	Taís Araújo	Won	
2020	Prêmio Área VIP	Best Actor	Chay Suede	Won	
2020	Prêmio Área VIP	Best Actor	Irandhir Santos	Nominated	
2020	Prêmio Área VIP	Best Actor	Murilo Benício	Nominated	
2020	Prêmio Área VIP	Character of the Year	Lurdes / Regina Casé	Nominated	
2020	Prêmio Área VIP	Breakthrough of the Year	Antônio Benício	Nominated	
2021	Venice TV Awards	Best Telenovela	Manuela Dias	Won	
2021	International Emmy Awards	Best Telenovela	Manuela Dias	Nominated	
