= Loveling =

2018 film

- Film poster
- Directed by: Gustavo Pizzi
- Written by: Karine Teles; Gustavo Pizzi
- Starring: Karine Teles
- Release date: 18 January 2018 (Sundance)
- Running time: 95 minutes
- Country: Brazil
- Language: Portuguese

Loveling (Portuguese: Benzinho) is a 2018 Brazilian drama film directed by Gustavo Pizzi. The film had its world premiere on 18 January 2018 in the World Dramatic Competition section at the 2018 Sundance Film Festival.

== Cast ==
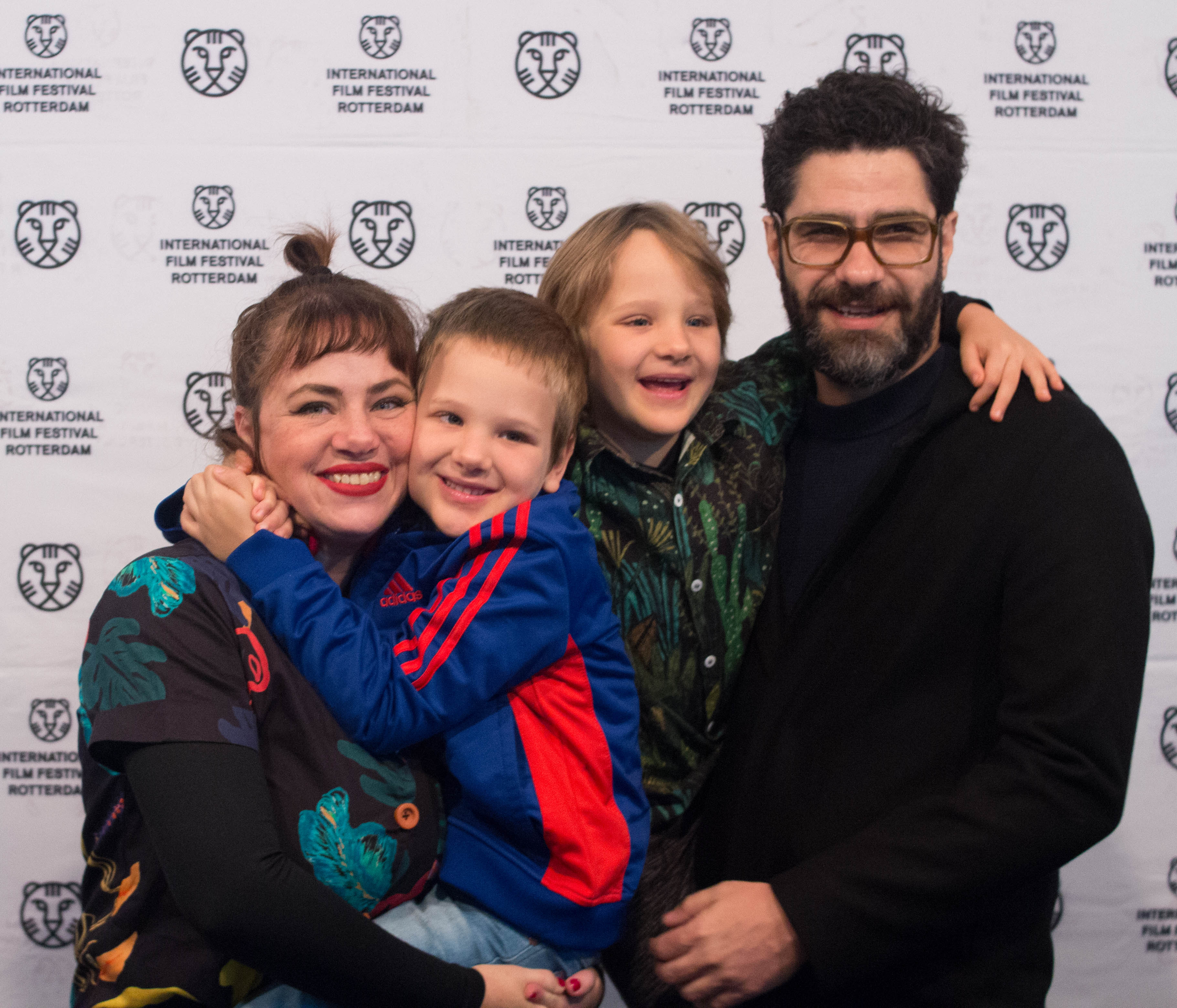
Cast and crew at the International Film Festival Rotterdam

- Karine Teles as Irene
- Otávio Müller as Klaus
- Adriana Esteves as Sônia
- Konstantinos Sarris as Fernando

== Reception ==
On review aggregator website Rotten Tomatoes, the film holds an approval rating of 95%, based on 19 reviews, and an average rating of 7.9/10. On Metacritic, the film has a weighted average score of 81 out of 100, based on 5 critics, indicating "universal acclaim".

== Awards and nominations ==
| Year | Award | Category | Nominee(s) | Result | Ref. |
|---|---|---|---|---|---|
| 2019 | Grande Prêmio do Cinema Brasileiro | Best Film | Loveling | Won | |
