= Mania de Você =

Brazilian telenovela

- Genre: Telenovela
- Created by: João Emanuel Carneiro
- Written by: Eliane Garcia; Marcia Prates; Marina Luisa; Zé Dassilva; Vincent Villari
- Directed by: Carlos Araújo
- Starring: Gabz; Agatha Moreira; Nicolas Prattes; Chay Suede; Adriana Esteves; Mariana Ximenes; Eliane Giardini
- Theme music composer: Rita Lee; Roberto de Carvalho
- Opening theme: "Mania de Você" by Anitta
- Country of origin: Brazil
- Original language: Portuguese
- No. of seasons: 1
- No. of episodes: 173

Production
- Producers: Gustavo Rebelo; Luis Otávio; Lucas Zardo
- Production company: Estúdios Globo

Original release
- Network: TV Globo
- Release: 9 September 2024 – 28 March 2025

Mania de Você (English title: Crazy About You) is a Brazilian telenovela created by João Emanuel Carneiro. It aired on TV Globo from 9 September 2024 to 28 March 2025. The telenovela stars Gabz, Agatha Moreira, Nicolas Prattes, Chay Suede, Adriana Esteves, Mariana Ximenes and Eliane Giardini.

== Cast ==
- Gabz as Viola
  - Isis Brito as child Viola
- Agatha Moreira as Luma
  - Laura Malfitano as child Luma
- Nicolas Prattes as Rudá
- Chay Suede as Mavi
- Adriana Esteves as Mércia
- Mariana Ximenes as Ísis Cavalcanti
- Eliane Giardini as Berta Pereira Cavalcanti
- Ângelo Antônio as Nahum
- Paulo Rocha as Volney
- Ana Beatriz Nogueira as Moema
- Alanis Guillen as Michele
- Bruno Montaleone as Cristiano
- Samuel de Assis as Daniel
- Bukassa Kabengele as Marcel
- Thalita Carauta as Leidi
- David Junior as Sirley
- Mariana Santos as Fátima
- Eriberto Leão as Robson
- Gi Fernandes as Evelyn
- Paulo Mendes as Tomás Pereira Cavalcanti
  - Miguel Bottini as child Tomás
- José Augusto Branco as Geraldo
- Érico Brás as Edmilson
- Ivy Souza as Dhu
- Vanessa Bueno as Diana
- Danilo Grangheia as Hugo
- Duda Batsow as Bruna
- Jaffar Bambirra as Iberê
  - Guilherme Leal as young Iberê
- Liza Del Dala as Lorena
- Lucas Wickhaus as Iarley
- Dandara Albuquerque as Sandra

=== Guest stars ===
- Rodrigo Lombardi as Molina
- Simone Spoladore as Cecília
- Fábio Assunção as Alfredo
- Allan Souza Lima as Guga
- Antonio Saboia as Henrique Pereira Cavalcanti
- Joana de Verona as Filipa
- Marcello Gonçalves as Frazão

== Production ==
Following the positive reception of Todas as Flores, an original telenovela for the streaming service Globoplay, João Emanuel Carneiro presented a new telenovela for evaluation for TV Globo's 9pm time-slot, which was subsequently approved. The telenovela, titled Mania de Você, was presented to the public at the Upfront 2024 event, held on October 19, 2023, and was confirmed as the replacement for Renascer. Carlos Araújo was confirmed as director of the telenovela, repeating partnership with Careneiro from Todas as Flores. Filming began on 27 May 2024, with the first scenes being shot in Rio de Janeiro.

== Ratings ==
Season	Episodes	First aired		Last aired		Avg. viewers (points)
Season	Episodes	Date	Viewers (points)	Date	Viewers (points)	Avg. viewers (points)
1	173	9 September 2024	23.0	28 March 2025	23.3	21.2
