= Unremember =

2018 film

- Directed by: Flavia Castro
- Screenplay by: Flavia Castro
- Produced by: Flavia Castro; Walter Salles
- Starring: Jeanne Boudier
- Cinematography: Heloísa Passos
- Edited by: Flávia Castro; François Gédigier
- Release date: 2018
- Language: Portuguese

Unremember (Portuguese: Deslembro) is a 2018 drama film written and directed by Flavia Castro, in her feature film debut.

A co-production between Brazil, France and Qatar, it premiered at the 75th Venice International Film Festival, in the Horizons sidebar. It won the Audience Award for best film, the FIPRESCI Prize and the award for Best Supporting Actress (Eliane Giardini) at the 2018 Rio de Janeiro International Film Festival.

== Cast ==
- Jeanne Boudier as Joana
- Sara Antunes as Ana
- Eliane Giardini as Lucia
- Hugo Abranches as Leon
- Arthur Raynaud as Paco
- Jesuíta Barbosa as Eduardo
- Antonio Carrara as Ernesto
- Maria Clara as Nadja
