= Milhem Cortaz =

Brazilian actor (born 1971)

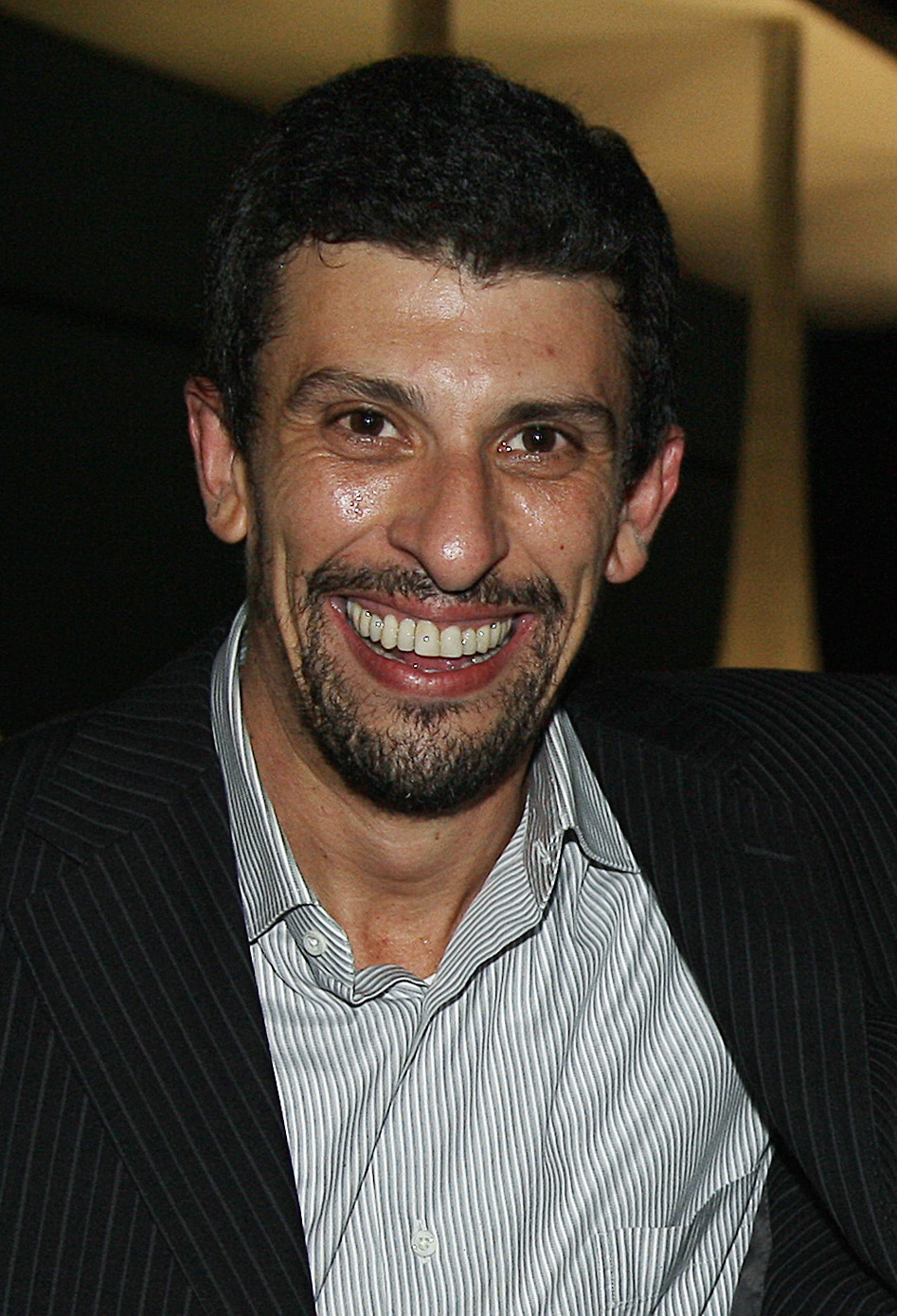
- Cortaz in 2009
- Born: Milhem Avance Cortas; 6 December 1971 (age 54); São Paulo, Brazil
- Occupation: Actor
- Years active: 1983–present
- Spouse: Ziza Brisola (m. 1999)
- Children: 1

Milhem Cortaz (born 6 December 1971) is a Brazilian actor.

== Career ==
Cortaz' first role came on the 2000 film Mater Dei, written by Diogo Mainardi, where he portrayed a security guard. On 2002, he premiered on the television with a minor character on Rede Globo's unsuccessful telenovela Desejos de Mulher. On the following year, he started gaining some notoriety after starring on the critically acclaimed Héctor Babenco film Carandiru, about the massacre on the prison of the same name.

On 2005, Cortaz starred on Rede Record's telenovela Essas Mulheres and acted on the controversial independent film A Concepção, in which he appears fully naked a considerable number of times. On the following year, he acted on Record's successful telenovela Cidadão Brasileiro and on the American-Brazilian film Journey to the End of the Night.

It was not until José Padilha's 2007 film Elite Squad, in which he portrays a corrupt police officer, that he gained notoriety of the major public. In 2009 he starred as Cazé on Record's Chamas da Vida and played the deceased father of former Brazilian president Luiz Inácio Lula da Silva in Fábio Barreto's Lula, Son of Brazil.

== Filmography ==
=== Film ===
Year	Title	Role	Notes
1999	Por Trás do Pano	Puck	
2000	Mater Dei	Security guard	
2000	Através da Janela	Raí's friend	
2003	Garotas do ABC	Alemão	
2003	Carandiru	Peixeira	
2003	Garrincha - Estrela Solitária		
2004	Nina	Carlão	
2004	Cabra-Cega	The man who leads the break into the apartment	
2005	De Glauber Para Jirges	Glauber	
2005	Cafundó	Plague trooper	
2005	A Concepção	Lino	
2006	Journey to the End of the Night	Rodrigo	
2006	Drained	Plumber	
2007	Meu Mundo em Perigo	Fito	
2007	Querô	Sr. Edgar	
2007	Not by Chance (Não por Acaso)	Paiva	
2007	Elite Squad	Fábio	
2007	Nome Próprio	Locador	
2007	O Magnata	Lúcio Flávio	
2008	Road Movie (short)		
2008	Embodiment of Evil	Padre Eugênio	
2008	Nossa Vida Não Cabe Num Opala	Lupa	
2008	Dangkou	Not Dead	
2009	Se Nada Mais Der Certo	Sibele	
2009	Lula, Son of Brazil	Aristides	
2010	Elite Squad: The Enemy Within	Fábio	
2011	Federal Bank Heist	Barão	
2012	Boca	Osmar	
2013	A Wolf at the Door (O Lobo atrás da Porta)		
2014	Alemão	Branco	
2014	Entreturnos		
2014	Trinta		
2015	Blue Blood (Sangue Azul)		
2016	The Ten Commandments: The Movie		
2016	Stronger than the World (Mais Forte que o Mundo)		
2016	Mundo Cão		
2016	Altas Expectativas		
2016	Aurora		
2016	Vidas Partidas		
2016	Canastra Suja	Celso	
2017	Malasartes e o Duelo com a Morte		

=== Television ===
Year	Title	Role	Notes
1995	A Próxima Vítima	Duda Maluco's henchman	Episode: "22 March"
1998	Torre de Babel	Prisoner	Episode: "26 October"
1999	Chiquinha Gonzaga	Soldier	Episode: "12 January"
2000	Sandy & Junior	Lieutenant William	Episode: "Independência é Arte"
2001	Pícara Sonhadora	Cláudio	Episodes: "10–25 October"
2002	Desejos de Mulher	Xavier	Episode: "23 May"
2003	Carga Pesada	Mauro	Episode: "Companheiros"
2004	Da Cor do Pecado	Burglar	Episode: "13 March"
2004	A Diarista	Oswaldo	Episode: "Aquele do Supermercado"
2004	A Grande Família	Mechanic	Episode: "Niterói 40 graus"
2005	A Escrava Isaura	Manuel da Mota Coqueiro	Episodes: "9–11 February"
2005	Essas Mulheres	Lobato	
2006	Cidadão Brasileiro	Américo Pereira	
2007	Vidas Opostas	Sextavado	
2007	Bicho do Mato (2006)	Inspector Paulo Mattos	
2008–2009	Chamas da Vida	Sargeant Carlos José Lima "Cazé"	
2009–2010	Poder Paralelo	Clóvis Fernandes	
2011	Autor por Autor	Various characters	Episode: "João Ubaldo Ribeiro"
2011	Sansão e Dalila	Abbas	
2012	Fora de Controle	Jorge Medeiros	
2013	Mistérios Discovery	Presenter	
2013	O Negócio	Renan	Episode: "Visão"
2014	Milagres de Jesus	Barzilai	Episode: "O Leproso de Genesaré"
2014	Plano Alto	João Titino	
2015	Magnifica 70	Major Chagas	Episode: "O Lançamento"
2015–2016	Os Dez Mandamentos	Bomani, Caleb	
2016	Conselho Tutelar	Jair Lemes	
2016–2017	A Terra Prometida	Caleb	
2018	Rua Augusta	Raul	
2018	Ilha de Ferro	Astério	
2018–2019	O Sétimo Guardião	Delegate Joubert Machado	
2019–2021	Amor de Mãe	Dr. Matias Junqueira	
2023	The Others	Wando	
2023	Compro Likes	Jorge Lopes "Sargento Ternurinha"	
2023	B.A: O Futuro Está Morto	Edson "Edd"	
2023	Anderson Spider Silva	Santiago	
2024–2025	Volta por Cima	Osmarino "Osmar" Souza	
2025	Vermelho Sangue	TBA	
