= Paula Cohen =

British-American geneticist

Paula Elaine Cohen
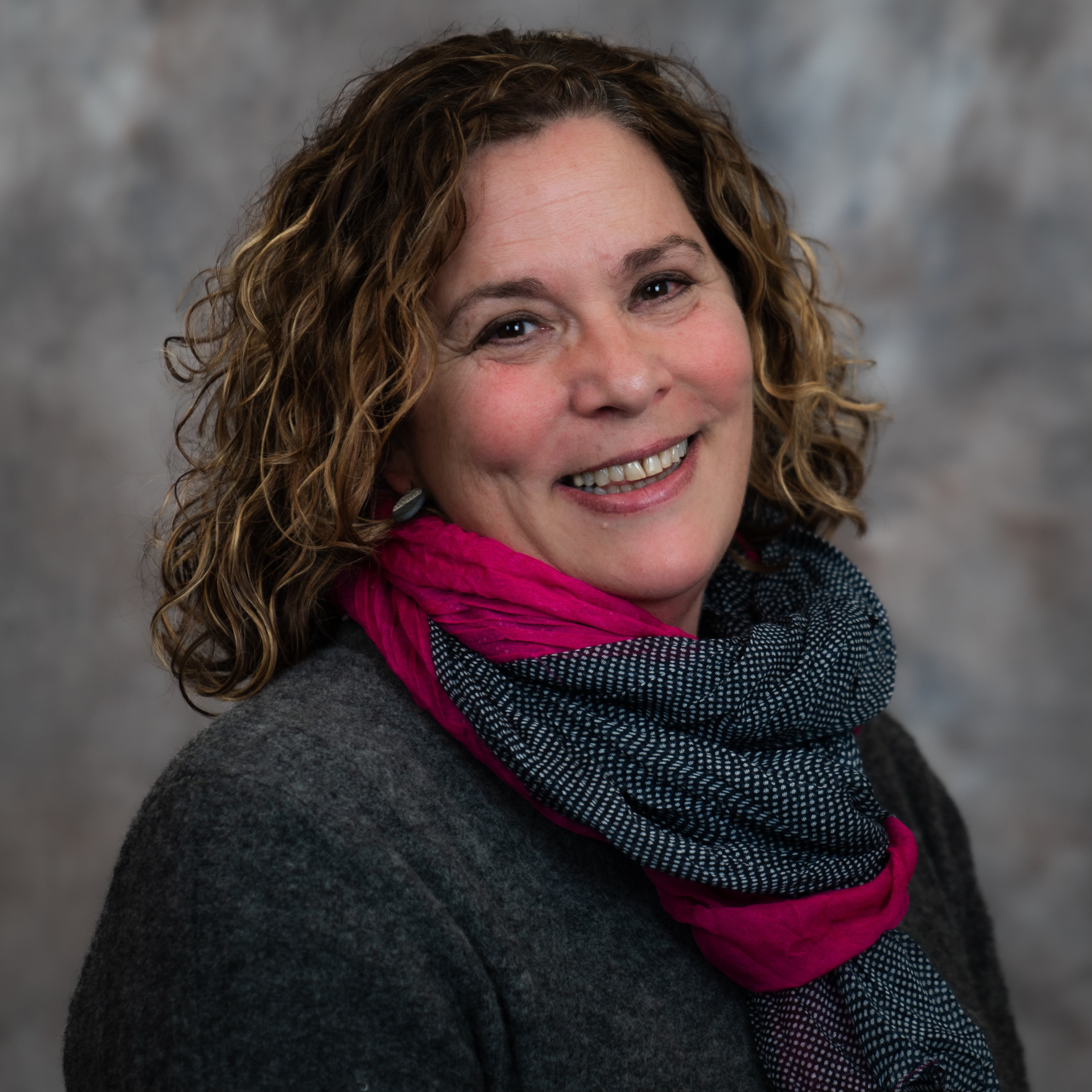
- Paula Elaine Cohen
- Education: University of London; King's College London
- Scientific career
- Workplaces: Albert Einstein College of Medicine; Cornell University
- Thesis: Studies on the endocrine control of implantation (1993)

Paula Elaine Cohen is a British-American geneticist who is a professor and Associate Dean for Research and Graduate Education in the College of Veterinary Medicine at Cornell University. Her research considers DNA repair mechanisms and the regulation of crossing over during mammalian meiosis. She was awarded the National Down Syndrome Society Charles J. Epstein Down Syndrome Research Award in 2004 and elected Fellow of the American Association for the Advancement of Science in 2021.

== Early life and education ==
Cohen was born and raised in Nigeria. She attended boarding school in England from the age of 8 and then her family moved back to their native England when she was 11 years old. Cohen was an undergraduate student at King's College London, where she majored in animal physiology. She was a doctoral researcher at the University of London, where she worked toward a PhD in reproductive physiology. During her doctorate she was based at Guy's and St Thomas' NHS Foundation Trust. Her research considered endocrine control during implantation. After earning her doctorate she moved to the United States, where she worked as a postdoctoral researcher at the Albert Einstein College of Medicine.

== Research and career ==
Cohen joined the faculty at Albert Einstein College of Medicine in 2000. Her early research considered gonadal function in males and females. Specifically, she worked on maternal mismatch repair proteins and how they impact Trisomy-21. Trisomy-21 is the abnormality in chromosomes that is responsible for Down syndrome. She moved to Cornell University in 2004, where she was made associate professor in 2007 and professor in 2013. She founded the Cornell Center for Reproductive Genomics in 2006, which seeks to promote research in reproductive health and fertility. She was appointed Associate Vice Provost for Life Sciences in 2018.

Cohen is interested in mammalian meiosis, gametogenesis and the role of a variety of DNA repair pathways in mediating meiosis. In particular, Cohen has studied the DNA mismatch repair (MMR) pathway, and described the major crossover pathway in mammalian meiosis. She has also studied the origins of male infertility and spermatogenesis. Specifically, Cohen is interested in the regulation of RNA during the formation of sperm.

Cohen was chair of the 2022 Gordon Research Conference Diverse and Conserved Molecular Mechanisms Preventing Aneuploidy During Gamete Production. The conference looked to explore meiosis, the cell division process that results in gametes for sexual reproduction. In 2023, she was chosen by her peer community to serve as the Co-Vice-Chair for the 2025 Gordon Research Conference on Germinal Stem Cell biology alongside Dr. Josephine Bowles. The Chair for that meeting was Dr. Mitinori Saitou. Cohen and Bowles are now slated to serve as Co-Chairs for the 2027 GRC Germinal Stem Cell Biology meeting.

== Awards and honours ==
- 2004 National Down Syndrome Society Charles J. Epstein Down Syndrome Research Award
- 2009 Provost's award for Distinguished Scholarship
- 2017 SUNY Chancellor's award for Academic Excellence
- 2021 Elected Fellow of the American Association for the Advancement of Science
- 2024 Trainee Mentoring Award from the Society for the Study of Reproduction in recognition of her commitment to the intellectual growth and career advancement of graduate and postdoctoral trainees in the reproductive sciences

== Selected publications ==
- W. Edelmann; P. E. Cohen; M. Kane; et al. (1996). "Meiotic pachytene arrest in MLH1-deficient mice". Cell. 85 (7): 1125–1134. doi:10.1016/s0092-8674(00)81312-4. PMID 8674118. Wikidata Q28510650.
- B Kneitz; P E Cohen; E Avdievich; et al. (2000). "MutS homolog 4 localization to meiotic chromosomes is required for chromosome pairing during meiosis in male and female mice". Genes & Development. 14 (9): 1085–1097. PMC 316572. PMID 10809667. Wikidata Q24606421.
- W Edelmann; P E Cohen; B Kneitz; et al. (1999). "Mammalian MutS homologue 5 is required for chromosome pairing in meiosis". Nature Genetics. 21 (1): 123–7. doi:10.1038/5075. PMID 9916805. Wikidata Q28295022.
