= Thalita Carauta =

Brazilian actress

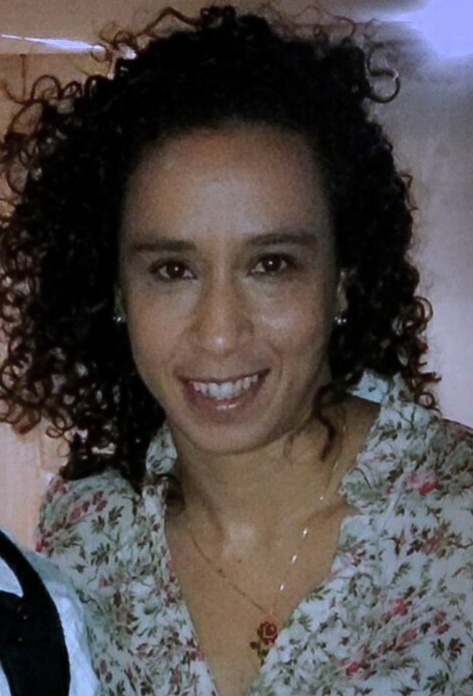
- Born: Thalita Carauta; October 2, 1982 (age 43); Rio de Janeiro
- Years active: 1994–present
- Known for: Zorra Total, Todas As Flores

Thalita Carauta (Portuguese: [taˈlitɐ kaˈɾawtɐ]; born 2 October 1982) is a Brazilian actress. She became known in Brazil in 2010 for playing Janete in Zorra Total. Among other works are "Todas as Flores" and "Segundo Sol".

== Filmography ==
Year	Title	Role	Notes
2005	A Diarista	Diana	Episódio: "Aquele da Revolução"
2005	A Lua Me Disse	Marieta	Episódio: "19 de agosto"
2006-07	Páginas da Vida	Lídia	
2007	O Sistema	Lua	
2007	A Diarista	Marinete dos Santos	Episódio: "Mãe Só Tem Duas"
2008	Casos e Acasos	Zefa	Episódio: "A Volta, a Cena e as Férias"
2008	Casos e Acasos	Regina	Episódio: "Hóspede e os Amantes"
2009	Três Irmãs	Eliete Macedo	
2010–15	Zorra Total	Janete/Nomealda/Clarete	
2015–16	Chapa Quente	Celma Azevedo	
2018	Segundo Sol	Gorete Afonso Falcão	
2019–21	Segunda Chamada	Profª. Eliete Sabá	
2022–23	Todas as Flores	Mauritânia Munhoz Carvalho	
2023–24	Elas por Elas	Adriana	
2024–25	Mania de Você	Leidi	

== Awards and nominations ==
Ano	Prêmio	Categoria	Nomeações	Resultado
2011	Prêmio Extra de Televisão	Revelação Feminina	Zorra Total	Won
2011	Melhores do Ano	Comédia (com Rodrigo Sant'Anna)	Zorra Total	Won
2011	Prêmio Master de Qualidade	Atriz Programa Humorístico	Zorra Total	Won
2012	Meus Prêmios Nick	Humorista Favorito	Zorra Total	Nominated
2015	Grande Prêmio do Cinema Brasileiro	Melhor Atriz Coadjuvante	O Lobo atrás da Porta	Won
2015	Prêmio Guarani de Cinema Brasileiro	Melhor Atriz Coadjuvante	O Lobo atrás da Porta	Nominated
2017	Prêmio Arte Qualidade Brasil	Melhor Atriz	5X Comédia	Won
2017	Prêmio de Humor	Performance	5X Comédia	Won
2018	Prêmio Extra de Televisão	"Sal na Pele" (Segundo Sol)	Nominated	
2019	Grande Prêmio Risadaria	Melhor Atriz	Segundo Sol	Won
2019	Prêmio The Brazilian Critic	Melhor Atriz Coadjuvante em Série Dramática	Segunda Chamada	Nominated
2020	Festival de Cinema do BRICS	Melhor Atriz	O Silêncio da Chuva	Won
2022	Festival Sesc Melhores Filmes	Melhor Atriz Nacional	O Silêncio da Chuva	Nominated
2022	Festival Sesc Melhores Filmes	Melhor Atriz Nacional	4 x 100 - Correndo por um Sonho	Nominated
2022	Prêmio Guarani de Cinema Brasileiro	Melhor Atriz	4 x 100 - Correndo por um Sonho	Pending
