= David Junior (actor) =

Brazilian actor

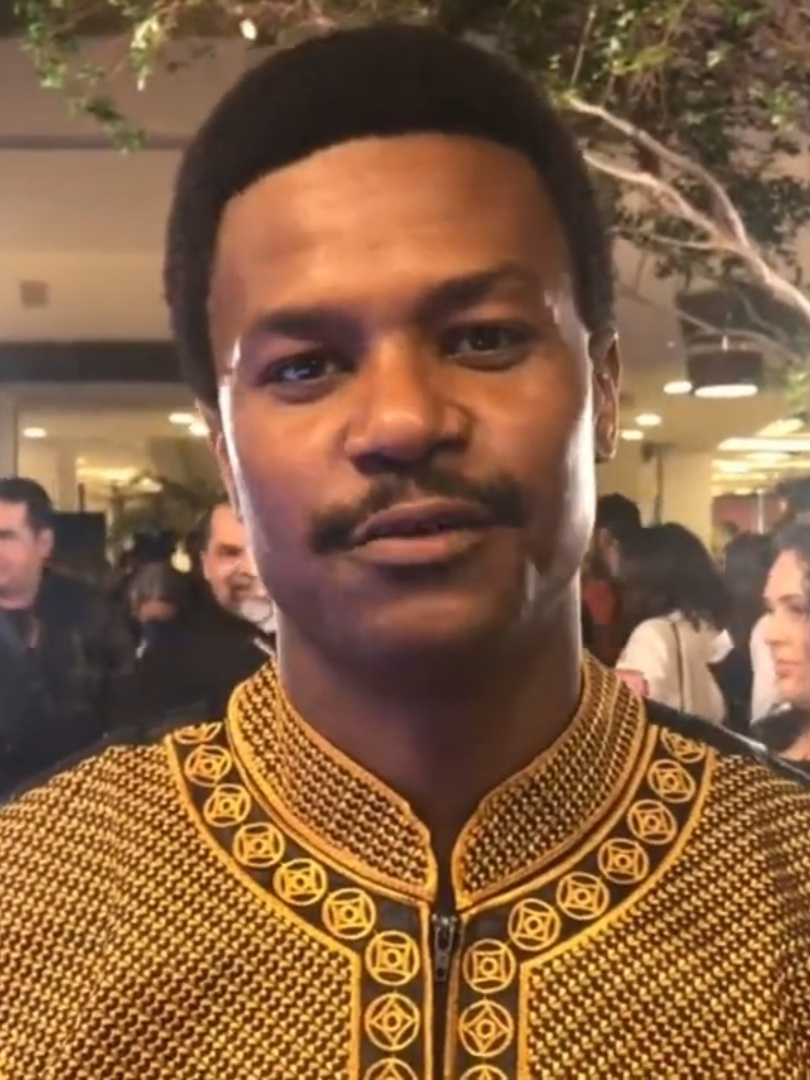
- Junior in 2022
- Born: December 8, 1985 (age 40); Nova Iguaçu, Brazil
- Occupation: Actor
- Years active: 2011–present
- Spouse: Yasmin Garcez (2018—present)

David Junior (born December 8, 1985) is a Brazilian actor.

== Career ==
He began to study theater at the age of 22, after small participations in soap operas, in 2016, through tests, obtained the paper of the slave Saviano in the series Liberdade, Liberdade of the Rede Globo. His participation in the plot of the eleven caused uproar when performing a scene of sex with Dionísia, represented by Maite Proença, and to appear naked. With this scene, its work reverberated in the social networks and it happened to be recognized to the public, and to gain prominence in the television.

In 2017, interpreted the businessman Dom in the telenovela Pega Pega. In the plot, he was an executive created in Europe, by his adopted mother Sabine, personage of Irene Ravache and administered the company along with the mother. After the end of the novel, due to the great success of his character, renewed contract for 3 years with the Rede Globo. In 2018, he played the role of the slave Menelau in the telenovela O Tempo Não Para.

== Filmography ==
=== Television ===
Year	Title	Role	Notes	Ref.
2010	A Cura		Season 1	
2011	Cordel Encantado	Cangaceiro Meia-Noite		
2014	Now Generation	Antônio Tonhão "Will Smith"		
2016	Liberdade, Liberdade	Saviano		
2017	Pega Pega	Dom Favre/Aristides Souza Damião "Tidinho"		
2018	O Tempo Não Para	Menelau Sabino Machado		
2019	Sessão de Terapia	Nando Batista	Season 4	
2019	Bom Sucesso	Ramon Madeira		
2020	Sob Pressão	Dr. Mauro		
2022	The Masked Singer Brasil	Dragão	Season 2	
2023	The End	Neto		
2024	Mania de Você	Sirley		
2025	Dança dos Famosos	Contestant	Season 22	
2026	Coração Acelerado	Leandro Brasil		
2026	Dona Beja	Antônio Sampaio		

=== Cinema ===
Year	Title	Role	Ref.
2018	Canastra Suja	Tatu	
2021	Pixinguinha, Um Homem Carinhoso	Pixinguinha	

== Awards and nominations ==
Year	Ceremony	Category	Nomination	Result
2018	Prêmio Gshow	Crush of the Year	David Junior	Nominated
2019	Prêmio F5	Sexier Man	David Junior	Nominated
2019	BreakTudo Awards	Actor of the Year	Bom Sucesso	Nominated
