= João Emanuel Carneiro =

Brazilian screenwriter, film director, and telenovela author

- Born: 17 February 1970 (age 56); Rio de Janeiro, Brazil
- Occupations: Film director Screenwriter
- Years active: 1991–present
- Spouse: Carmo Dalla Vecchia (m. 2006)
- Children: 1
- Relatives: Cláudia Ohana (half-sister)

João Emanuel Carneiro Silva (born 17 February 1970), also known by his initials JEC, is a Brazilian screenwriter and film director of telenovelas. His many works include: Central Station, Midnight, Orfeu, and Castelo Rá-Tim-Bum.

His greatest hit on television was Avenida Brasil that broke several TV audience records in Brazil and abroad, being sold to more than 130 countries. Aired originally between March–October 2012, the telenovela achieved an overall average of 42 rating points and a 69% share. The last episode scored an impressive 56 rating points and an 84% share, with more than 50 million (sic) viewers, becoming the most watched TV program of the year. Avenida Brasil, was considered by Forbes the most-commercially successful telenovela in Brazilian history, with total earnings estimated in $1 billion.

He was considered by Época, one of the 100 most influential Brazilians in 2012.

== Biography ==
Carneiro began his writing career and director in 1991 with the Zero Zero movie, but achieved international popularity to sign the award-winning film script by Walter Salles, Central Station, starring by Fernanda Montenegro.

On television, he collaborated with Maria Adelaide Amaral in the script of the miniseries A Muralha (2000), Os Maias (2001) and in the telenovela Desejos de Mulher (2002). His first work as lead author was in Da Cor do Pecado (2004), which was a great success on Brazilian television. In 2006, wrote Cobras & Lagartos. In 2008, he wrote the telenovela A Favorita, his first in primetime.

Avenida Brasil written by him in 2012, became the most exported telenovela of Rede Globo, surpassing Da Cor do Pecado, which was the sales leader for other countries so far. The telenovela has been licensed for 150 countries over the past 20 months and dubbed into 19 languages as English, Spanish, Arabic, Greek, Polish, Russian and French. Besides Europe and Latin America, Avenue Brazil has been licensed to more than 58 countries in Africa and Middle East countries as well.

João Emanuel Carneiro is half brother of actress Claudia Ohana and son of writer, anthropologist and art critic Lelia Coelho Frota.

== Career ==
Television

Year	Work	Note
2000	A Muralha	Co-author
2001	Os Maias	Co-author
2002	Desejos de Mulher	Co-author
2003	Brava Gente	Episode: O Crime Perfeito
2004	Da Cor do Pecado	Creator
2006	Cobras & Lagartos	Creator
2008	A Favorita	Creator
2009	Cama de Gato	Text supervisor
2010	A Cura	Creator and author
2012	Avenida Brasil	Creator and author
2014	Segunda Dama	Text supervisor
2015	A Regra do Jogo	Creator and author
2018	Segundo Sol	Creator and author
2021	Todas as Flores	Creator and author
2024	Mania de Você	Creator and author
2027	Avenida Brasil 2	Creator and author

Films

Year	Work	Note	Director
1991	Zero a Zero	Screenwriter	Himself
1998	Central Station	Screenwriter	Walter Salles
1998	Midnight	Screenwriter	Walter Salles / Daniela Thomas
1999	Orfeu	Screenwriter	Cacá Diegues
1999	Castelo Rá-Tim-Bum	Screenwriter	Cao Hamburguer
1999	Bem-vindos ao Paraíso	Screenwriter	Marco Figueiredo
2000	Cronicamente Inviável	Screenwriter	Sérgio Bianchi
2001	A Partilha	Screenwriter	Daniel Filho
2001	O Filho Predileto	Screenwriter	Walter Lima Jr.
2001	Um Crime Nobre	Screenwriter	Walter Lima Jr.
2002	Que sera, sera	Screenwriter	Murilo Salles
2003	Deus É Brasileiro	Screenwriter	Cacá Diegues
2003	Cristina Wants to Get Married	Screenwriter	Luiz Villaça
2004	A Dona da História	Screenwriter	Daniel Filho
2004	Redentor	Screenwriter	Cláudio Torres

== Awards ==
Year	Award	Category	Work	Result
1998	Prêmio Estação Botafogo	Screenwriter of the Year	Central Station	Won
1998	Satellite Awards	Best Original Screenplay	Central Station	Nominated
2004	APCA Award	Best Telenovela	Da Cor do Pecado	Won
2005	Prêmio Contigo! de TV	Best Screenplay	Da Cor do Pecado	Nominated
2008	Prêmio Extra de Televisão	Best Telenovela	A Favorita	Won
2008	Faz Diferença Award (from O Globo)	Revista da TV	A Favorita	Won
2008	Prêmio Quem de Televisão	Best Screenplay	A Favorita	Won
2008	APCA Award	Best Telenovela	A Favorita	Won
2009	Prêmio Qualidade Brasil	Best Telenovela	A Favorita	Won
2009	Prêmio Qualidade Brasil	Best Screenplay	A Favorita	Won
2009	Prêmio Contigo! de TV	Best Telenovela	A Favorita	Won
2009	Prêmio Contigo! de TV	Best Screenplay	A Favorita	Won
2009	Troféu Imprensa	Best Telenovela	A Favorita	Won
2009	Troféu Internet	Best Telenovela	A Favorita	Won
2012	Prêmio Extra de Televisão	Best Telenovela	Avenida Brasil	Won
2012	APCA Award	Critics Award	Avenida Brasil	Won
2012	Prêmio Quem de Televisão	Best Screenplay	Avenida Brasil	Won
2013	Troféu Imprensa	Best Telenovela	Avenida Brasil	Won
2013	Troféu Internet	Best Telenovela	Avenida Brasil	Won
2013	Prêmio Contigo! de TV	Best Telenovela	Avenida Brasil	Won
2013	Prêmio Contigo! de TV	Best Screenplay	Avenida Brasil	Won
2013	41st International Emmy Awards	Best Telenovela	Avenida Brasil	Nominated
2016	44th International Emmy Awards	Best Telenovela	A Regra do Jogo	Nominated
