= Rua Augusta (TV series) =

- Genre: Drama
- Based on: Allenby St.
- Starring: Fiorella Mattheis; Pathy de Jesus; Rodrigo Pandolfo; Milhem Cortaz; Lourinelson Vladmir; Zemanuel Pinheiro; Dani Glamour; Rui Ricardo; Carlos Meceni; Rafael Dib
- Country of origin: Brazil
- Original language: Portuguese
- No. of seasons: 1
- No. of episodes: 12

Production
- Executive producer: Pedro Morelli
- Production location: São Paulo
- Running time: 30 minutes
- Production companies: O2 Filmes; TNT Brazil

Original release
- Network: TNT Brazil
- Release: March 15 – May 24, 2018

Rua Augusta is a Brazilian drama television series based on the Israeli series Allenby St. that premiered on TNT Brazil on March 15, 2018. It is the first Brazilian original series released by TNT in a co-production with O2 Filmes. It is directed by Pedro Morelli and Fábio Mendonça, and written by Ana Reber, Jaqueline Vargas and Julia Furrer.

The series brings as main scenario the underground culture and prostitution in Rua Augusta, one of the most emblematic streets of the city of São Paulo.

== Premise ==
The narrative accompanies the story of Mika (Fiorella Mattheis), who works as a stripper at the nightclub Love. In this bustling scenario, she builds a relatively normal life and hides facts from her past. Throughout the series, she will have a loving involvement and develop a great partnership with Alex (Lourinelson Vladmir), who is the manager at the Hell nightclub.

== Cast ==
- Fiorella Mattheis as Mika
- Pathy de Jesus as Nicole
- Rodrigo Pandolfo as Emílio
- Milhem Cortaz as Raul
- Lourinelson Vladmir as Alex
- Zemanuel Pinheiro as Cézar
- Glamour Garcia as Babete
- Rui Ricardo as Dimas
- Carlos Meceni as Maurício Amaral
- Rafael Dib as Lucas

== Release ==
The series premiered on TNT Brazil on March 15, 2018. The streaming service Amazon Prime Video purchased rights to broadcast the series in Latin America.
