= Eliane Giardini =

Brazilian actress (born 1952)

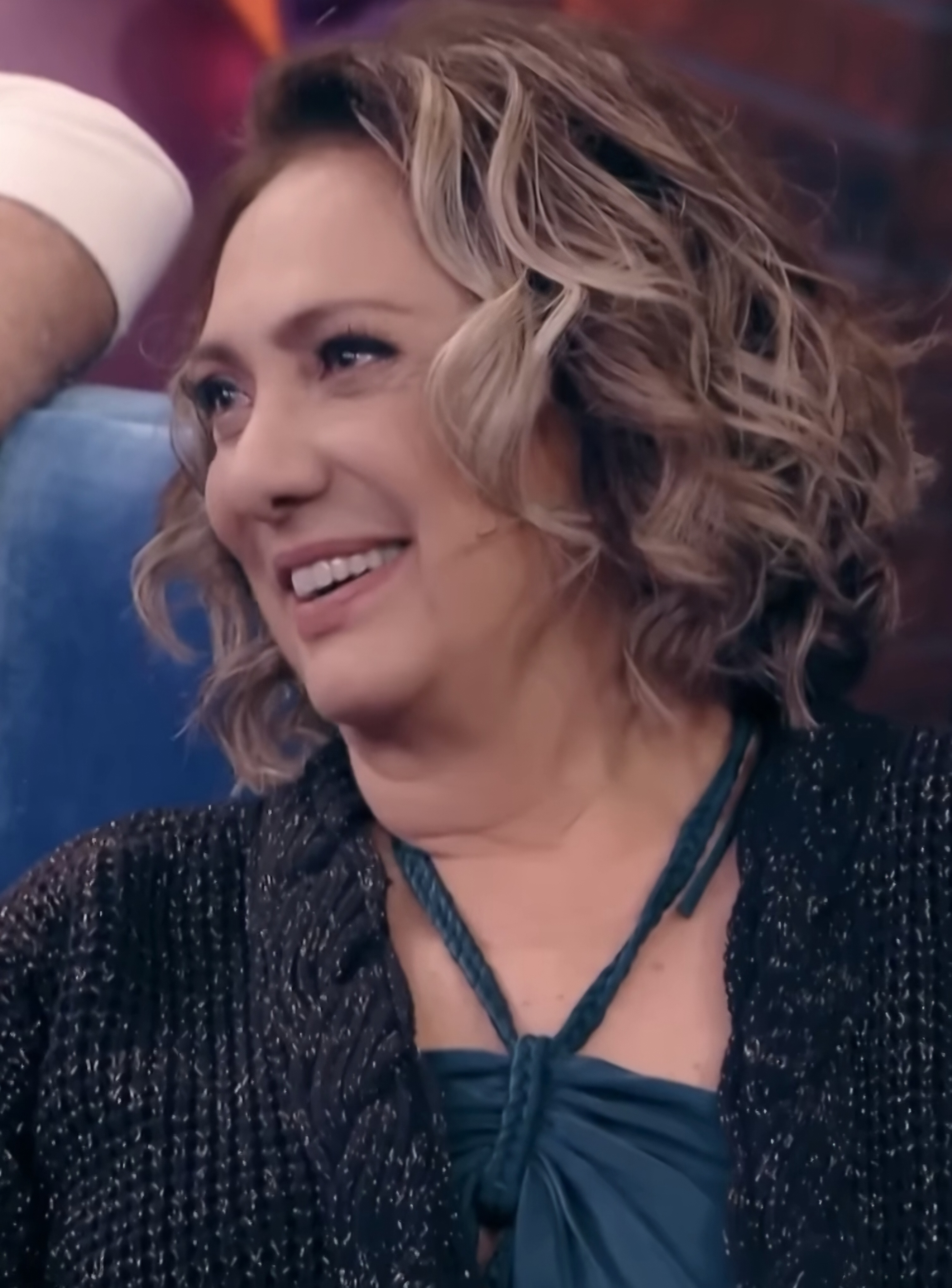
- Giardini in 2024
- Born: Eliane Teresinha Giardini; 20 October 1952 (age 73); Sorocaba, São Paulo, Brazil
- Occupation: Actress
- Years active: 1982–present
- Spouse: Paulo Betti (m. 1973; div. 1997)
- Children: 2

Eliane Teresinha Giardini (born 20 October 1952) is a Brazilian actress. Although she had little career success until the age of forty, she is now considered one of Brazil's foremost actresses.

== Biography ==
Giardini was born in Sorocaba, São Paulo. Formerly married to actor Paulo Betti, she is the mother of two girls, Juliana and Mariana Betti, both actresses themselves.

== Appearances ==
=== TV ===
- Ninho da Serpente (as Lídia)
- Campeão (as Cristina)
- Vida Roubada (as Hilda)
- Meus Filhos, Minha Vida
- Uma Esperança no Ar (as Débora)
- Helena (as Joana)
- Caso Verdade
- Desejo (as Lucinda)
- Felicidade (as Isaura)
- Renascer (as Dona Patroa/Yolanda)
- Incidente em Antares (as Eleutéria)
- A Comédia da Vida Privada (as Helena)
- Irmãos Coragem (as Estela)
- Engraçadinha (as Maria Aparecida)
- Você Decide
- Explode Coração (as Lola)
- A Indomada (as Santa Maria)
- Você Decide (as Sílvia)
- Mulher (as Anita)
- Hilda Furacão (as Berta)
- Torre de Babel (as Wandona)
- Andando nas Nuvens (as Janete)
- Você Decide (as Ana)
- O Belo e As Feras (as Ludmila)
- Zorra Total (as Maria Rosa / Roxana)
- Os Maias (as The Countess of Gouvarinho)
- Os Normais (as Marta)
- O Clone (as Nazira Rachid)
- A Casa das Sete Mulheres (as Caetana)
- Um Só Coração (as Tarsila do Amaral)
- América (as Viúva Neuta)
- JK (as Tarsila do Amaral)
- Cobras & Lagartos (as Eva/Esmeralda)
- Eterna Magia (as Pérola)
- Capitu (as Dona Glória Santiago)
- India – A Love Story (as Indira Ananda)
- Tempos Modernos (as Hélia Pimenta)
- Afinal, o Que Querem as Mulheres? (as Profª Noemi)
- Lara com Z (as Sandra Heibert)
- Avenida Brasil (as Muricy Araújo)
- Amor à Vida (as Ordália Vianna)
- Órfãos da Terra (as Rânia Anssarah Nasser)
- Amor de Mãe (as Vera)
- Terra e Paixão (as Agatha Santini La Selva)
- Mania de Você (as Berta Pereira Cavalcanti)

=== Movies ===
- O Salário da Morte
- Acorda, Raimundo... Acorda!!!
- O Dia da Cura
- O Amor Está no Ar
- Uma Vida Em Segredo
- Histórias do olhar
- Olga
- Filtro de Papel
- Chatô, o Rei do Brasil
- Um Homem Só
- Gostosas, Lindas & Sexies
- A Fera na Selva
- Unremember
