= Vale Tudo (2025 TV series) =

Brazilian telenovela

- Genre: Telenovela
- Based on: Vale Tudo by: Gilberto Braga; Aguinaldo Silva; Leonor Bassères
- Developed by: Manuela Dias
- Written by: Manuela Dias; Márcio Haiduck; Aline Maia; Pedro Barros; Cláudia Gomes; Luciana Pessanha
- Directed by: Paulo Silvestrini
- Starring: Taís Araújo; Bella Campos; Renato Góes; Cauã Reymond; Débora Bloch; Paolla Oliveira; Alexandre Nero; Humberto Carrão
- Theme music composer: Nilo Romero; George Israel; Cazuza
- Opening theme: "Brasil" by Gal Costa
- Country of origin: Brazil
- Original language: Portuguese
- No. of seasons: 1
- No. of episodes: 173

Production
- Producers: Lucas Zardo; Luciana Monteiro
- Production company: Estúdios Globo

Original release
- Network: TV Globo
- Release: 31 March – 17 October 2025

Vale Tudo (English title: Anything Goes) is a Brazilian telenovela developed by Manuela Dias, based on the 1988 telenovela of the same name, created by Gilberto Braga, Aguinaldo Silva and Leonor Bassères. It aired on TV Globo from 31 March 2025 to 17 October 2025. The telenovela stars Taís Araújo, Bella Campos, Renato Góes, Cauã Reymond, Débora Bloch, Paolla Oliveira, Alexandre Nero and Humberto Carrão.

== Plot ==
Raquel Accioli is an upright woman of humble origins who lives with her father, Salvador, in Foz do Iguaçu. Accompanying her is her daughter, Maria de Fátima Accioli, a cold and unscrupulous young woman who abhors poverty and aspires to be rich and successful at any cost. When Salvador dies, Maria de Fátima sells the family's only property, which is in her name, without informing her mother and moves to Rio de Janeiro with the goal of achieving social ascension by infiltrating the city's upper class. After discovering her daughter's whereabouts, Raquel travels to Rio in search of her, where she meets business administrator Ivan, with whom she falls in love. The two develop a relationship, while Raquel starts selling sandwiches on the beach to survive.

While Raquel honestly struggles to climb the social ladder, Maria de Fátima allies herself with model and gigolo César Ribeiro, a scoundrel who encourages her to seduce young Afonso Roitman, one of the richest heirs in the country and son of the powerful businesswoman Odete Roitman, director of the Transcontinental Airlines (TCA) company, who considers herself superior to everyone and hates living in Brazil. Maria de Fátima pretends to be a friend of Afonso's girlfriend, content producer Solange Duprat, to steal her boyfriend and become a member of high society. The Roitman family didn't expect Odete's return to the country after a period abroad. Arrogant, prejudiced, and authoritarian, Odete manipulates her children's lives and humiliates all her subordinates and people of lower social class than her own. The one who suffers most from her mother's actions is Heleninha Roitman, a sensitive and insecure visual artist who sees her career crumble as she succumbs to alcoholism, damaging her relationship with her family.

== Cast ==
- Taís Araújo as Raquel Gomes Accioli
- Bella Campos as Maria de Fátima Accioli
  - Laura Henriques as child Maria de Fátima
- Renato Góes as Ivan Meireles
- Cauã Reymond as César Ribeiro
- Débora Bloch as Odete Almeida Roitman
- Paolla Oliveira as Helena Almeida Roitman "Heleninha"
- Alexandre Nero as Marco Aurélio Cantanhede
- Humberto Carrão as Afonso Almeida Roitman
- Alice Wegmann as Solange Duprat
- Malu Galli as Celina Aguiar Junqueira
- Carolina Dieckmann as Leila Cantanhede
- João Vicente de Castro as Renato Fillipeli
- Matheus Nachtergaele as Audálio Candeias "Poliana"
- Karine Teles as Aldeíde Candeias
- Belize Pombal as Consuelo Galhardo
- Luís Melo as Bartolomeu Meireles
- Edvana Carvalho as Eunice Meireles
- Thomás Aquino as Mário Sérgio
- Lucas Leto as Fabiano Sardinha
- Luís Salém as Eugênio Albuquerque
- Maeve Jinkings as Cecília Cantanhede
- Lorena Lima as Laís Amorim
- Pedro Waddington as Tiago Augusto Roitman Cantanhede
- Ramille as Fernanda Meireles
- Breno Ferreira as André Galhardo
- Thiago Martins as Vasco
- Ingrid Gaigher as Lucimar da Silva
- Luís Lobianco as Sebastião Freitas
- Letícia Vieira as Gilda
- Leandro Firmino as Jarbas Galhardo
- Jéssica Marques as Daniela Galhardo
- Cacá Ottoni as Marieta
- Licínio Januário as Luciano
- Felipe Ricca as Carlos
- Bruna Aiiso as Suzana
- Ywyzar Guajajara as Flávia
- Tato Gabus Mendes as Alfredo Queiroz
- Fernanda Botelho as Marina
- Bernardo Velasco as Igor
- Fátima Patrício as Dayse
- Ricardo Teodoro as Olavo Jardim
- Miguel Moro as Bruno Castro Meireles
- Rafael Fuchs as Jorginho

=== Guest stars ===
- Júlio Andrade as Rubens Accioli "Rubinho"
- Antônio Pitanga as Salvador Gomes
- Maria Padilha as Laurita Vargas
- Irandhir Santos as William José Cardoso / William McPherson
- Rhaisa Batista as Cláudia
- Samuel Melo as Franklin
- Rejane Faria as Marisa
- Rafael Baronesi as Rodolfo
- Arieta Corrêa as Dr. Ana
- Thelmo Fernandes as Santana
- Ângelo Rodrigues as Martin Castrovilli
- Manoel Madeira as Bernardo
- Fernanda Marques as Vera
- Álvaro Bizinela as Christian Günther
- Carol Trentini as herself
- Blogueirinha as herself

== Production ==
On 7 August 2023, journalist Valmir Montarelli, from Veja magazine, announced that TV Globo was preparing a remake of the 1989 telenovela Vale Tudo, created and written by Gilberto Braga, Aguinaldo Silva and Leonor Bassères, in celebration of the network's 60th anniversary and the 75th anniversary of Brazilian television. In addition, Vale Tudo would be the third remake of the "9 PM slot" and the fourth of the 2020s, after Pantanal, Elas por Elas and Renascer. On 26 August 2023, TV Globo confirmed Manuela Dias as the writer of the remake. The remake also responds to a need of the network, since the material of the original telenovela would be too outdated for current times, which made it impossible to rerun it in 2022 in the Vale a Pena Ver de Novo programming block, and to export it to foreign markets. Originally, Vale Tudo was set to be an exclusive Globoplay production with 60 episodes and would be adapted by Lucas Paraizo. Paulo Silvestrini was chosen to direct the telenovela after the success of Vai na Fé, while Sérgio Marques, a writer who has worked on many of Braga's telenovelas, was rehired to help with the scripts. Filming began on 25 November 2024, with the first scenes being shot in Foz do Iguaçu at the Iguaçu Falls.

== Ratings ==
Season	Episodes	First aired		Last aired		Avg. viewers (points)
Season	Episodes	Date	Viewers (points)	Date	Viewers (points)	Avg. viewers (points)
1	173	31 March 2025	24.3	17 October 2025	30.2	23.5
