= Dona de Mim (TV series) =

Brazilian telenovela

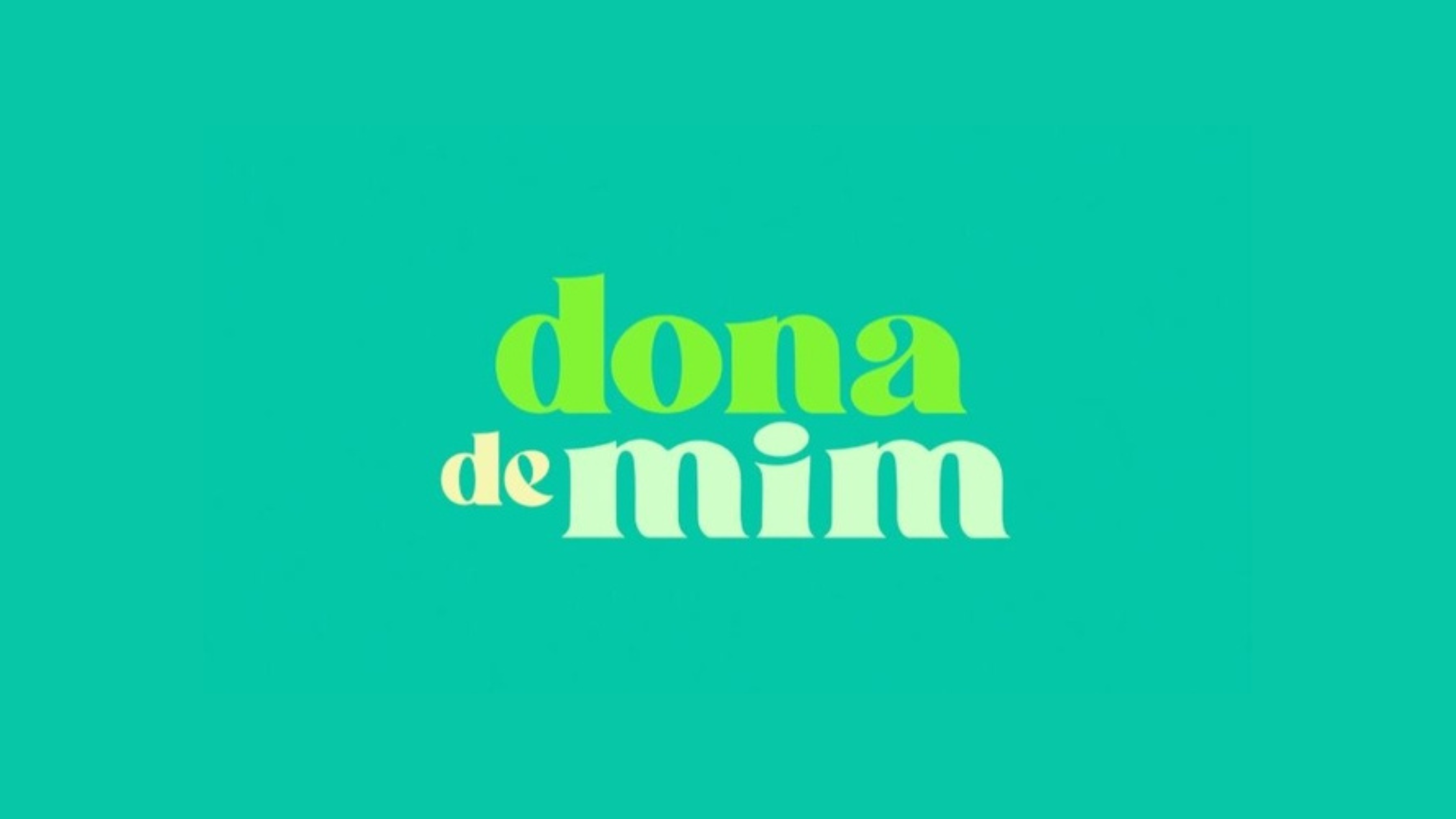
- Genre: Telenovela
- Created by: Rosane Svartman
- Written by: Juan Jullian; Renata Sofia; Jaqueline Vargas; Michel Carvalho; Mário Viana; Carolina Santos
- Directed by: Allan Fiterman
- Starring: Clara Moneke; Humberto Morais; Juan Paiva; Rafael Vitti; Cláudia Abreu; Tony Ramos; Marcello Novaes; Aline Borges
- Theme music composer: Iza; Arthur Marques
- Opening theme: "Dona de Mim" by Iza ft. Azzy & Sandra de Sá
- Country of origin: Brazil
- Original language: Portuguese
- No. of seasons: 1
- No. of episodes: 218

Production
- Producer: Mariana Pinheiro
- Production company: Estúdios Globo

Original release
- Network: TV Globo
- Release: 28 April 2025 – 9 January 2026

Dona de Mim (English title: Queen of Myself) is a Brazilian telenovela created by Rosane Svartman. It aired on TV Globo from 28 April 2025 to 9 January 2026. The telenovela stars Clara Moneke, Humberto Morais, Juan Paiva, Rafael Vitti, Cláudia Abreu, Tony Ramos, Marcello Novaes and Aline Borges.

== Plot ==
The plot follows the story of Leona "Léo", a good-humored, hardworking, and determined young woman who constantly struggles with financial difficulties. She lives with her grandmother Yara and her sister Stephany in the São Cristóvão neighborhood in the North Zone of Rio de Janeiro. Previously, Leona was a Public Relations student and six months pregnant when she was about to marry Marlon, expecting Sophya, her first daughter. However, Leona's world crumbled when she discovered she had suffered a miscarriage, leading to depression and the end of her relationship with him. Six years later, the pair meet again, but now Léo has dropped out of school and is making ends meet to financially support her family, while Marlon is in a relationship with kickboxer Bárbara and remains determined to pursue his dream of becoming a military police officer, but must face the harsh reality of the profession, while also discovering that he still harbors strong feelings for Léo, and vice versa. Léo's family begins to experience serious financial problems, to the point where they can barely afford Stephany's medical school. To prevent her sister from dropping out of college, Léo ends up accepting a job as a nanny for the Boaz family, wealthy owners of a lingerie factory.

The Boaz family consists of the patriarch Abel, the company president, who is married to the younger actress Filipa, who lives in constant existential crises, feeling displaced and undervalued by her husband, in addition to having some family problems with her daughter Nina, later discovering she suffers from bipolar disorder. There is also the frail Rosa, Abel's mother, who gradually discovers she has Alzheimer's disease. Abel has four children from previous relationships: the hardworking Samuel, the womanizing and immature Davi, and the talented Ayla, in addition to the troublemaker Sofia. Sofia was adopted by Abel and Filipa after her mother, Ellen, who was one of the company's employees, died when the girl was still a baby and ended up giving her to the businessman. Seeking ways to get the attention of her parents and siblings, Sofia always ends up playing pranks on the nannies hired to take care of her, including Léo, but her arrival ends up changing the little girl's perspective, turning her into her best friend (despite the coincidence of the girl's name being the same as the daughter Léo lost), just as she also wins the sympathy of Sofia's other three siblings.

== Cast ==
- Clara Moneke as Leona "Léo" Larissa da Silva Senna
- Juan Paiva as Samuel Boaz
- Tony Ramos as Abel Rubin Boaz
- Cláudia Abreu as Filipa Campelo Boaz
- Marcello Novaes as Jaques Boaz
- Aline Borges as Tânia Boaz
- Elis Cabral as Sofia Soares Boaz
- Humberto Morais as Marlon
- Rafael Vitti as Davi Boaz
- Giovana Cordeiro as Bárbara
- Armando Babaioff as Vanderson Silveira
- Marcos Pasquim as Ricardo Monteiro
- Leona Cavalli as Gabriela Moller Stoltz
- Giovanna Lancellotti as Kamila "Kami" Dias
- Felipe Simas as Danilo Santos
- Haonê Thinar as Pâmela "Pam"
- L7nnon as Ryan
- Suely Franco as Rosa Boaz
- Ernani Moraes as Manuel Santos
- Sílvia Bandeira as Isabela Campelo
- Thardelly Lima as Enzo Cariri
- Cyda Moreno as Yara da Silva Senna
- Vilma Melo as Jussara Senna
- Adélio Lima as Luis "Luisão"
- Bel Lima as Ayla Boaz
- Flora Camolese as Nina Campelo
- Nykolly Fernandes as Stephany da Silva Senna
- Cecília Chancez as Dara
- Pedro Fernandes as Peter Santos
- Guti Fraga as Father Paulo
- Hugo Resende as Alan Barbosa
- Pedro Alves as Caco
- Gabriel Sanches as Breno
- Luana Tanaka as Gisele
- Giovanna Jesus as Ivy
- Gabriel Fuentes as Júlio
- Carol Marra as Natara
- Faiska Alves as Jefferson "Jeff"
- Pedro Henrique Ferreira as Lucas
- Cris Larin as Denise
- Nilson Nunes as Silva
- Lorenzo Reis as André Dias "Dedé"
- Luísa Guedes as Antônia
- Bella Roberth as Aurora
- Theo Matos

=== Guest stars ===
- Camila Pitanga as Ellen Soares Silveira
- Jean Paulo Campos as Yuri dos Santos
- Marcelo Mello Jr. as Costa
- Adriana Bellonga as Mariana
- Miguel Nader as Sergeant Cardoso
- Paulo Reis as Ceremony Manager

== Production ==
After Vai na Fé (2023), which was one of the biggest ratings successes in the "7 PM slot" in the post-COVID-19 pandemic period since Salve-se Quem Puder (2020–21), Rosane Svartman began production of another telenovela for the timeslot in July 2024, with it being approved and announced at TV Globo's upfront for 2025, held on October 16, 2024. The telenovela is titled Dona de Mim, after the song and album by singer Iza, released in 2018. Allan Fiterman is the director of the telenovela. Filming began in January 2025.

== Ratings ==
Season	Episodes	First aired		Last aired		Avg. viewers (points)
Season	Episodes	Date	Viewers (points)	Date	Viewers (points)	Avg. viewers (points)
1	218	28 April 2025	22.2	9 January 2026	21.5	21.3
