= Pedro Alves =

Pedro Alves may refer to:

- Pedro Alves (footballer, born 1979), Portuguese football goalkeeper
- Pedro Alves (footballer, born 1983), Portuguese football winger
- Pedro Alves (footballer, born 1999), Brazilian football defender
- Pepé Alves (born 1999), Angolan football defender
- Pedro Alves (Portuguese actor) (born 1975), Portuguese actor and comedian
- Pedro Alves (Brazilian actor) (born 1993)
