= Clara Moneke =

Brazilian actress and model (born 1998)

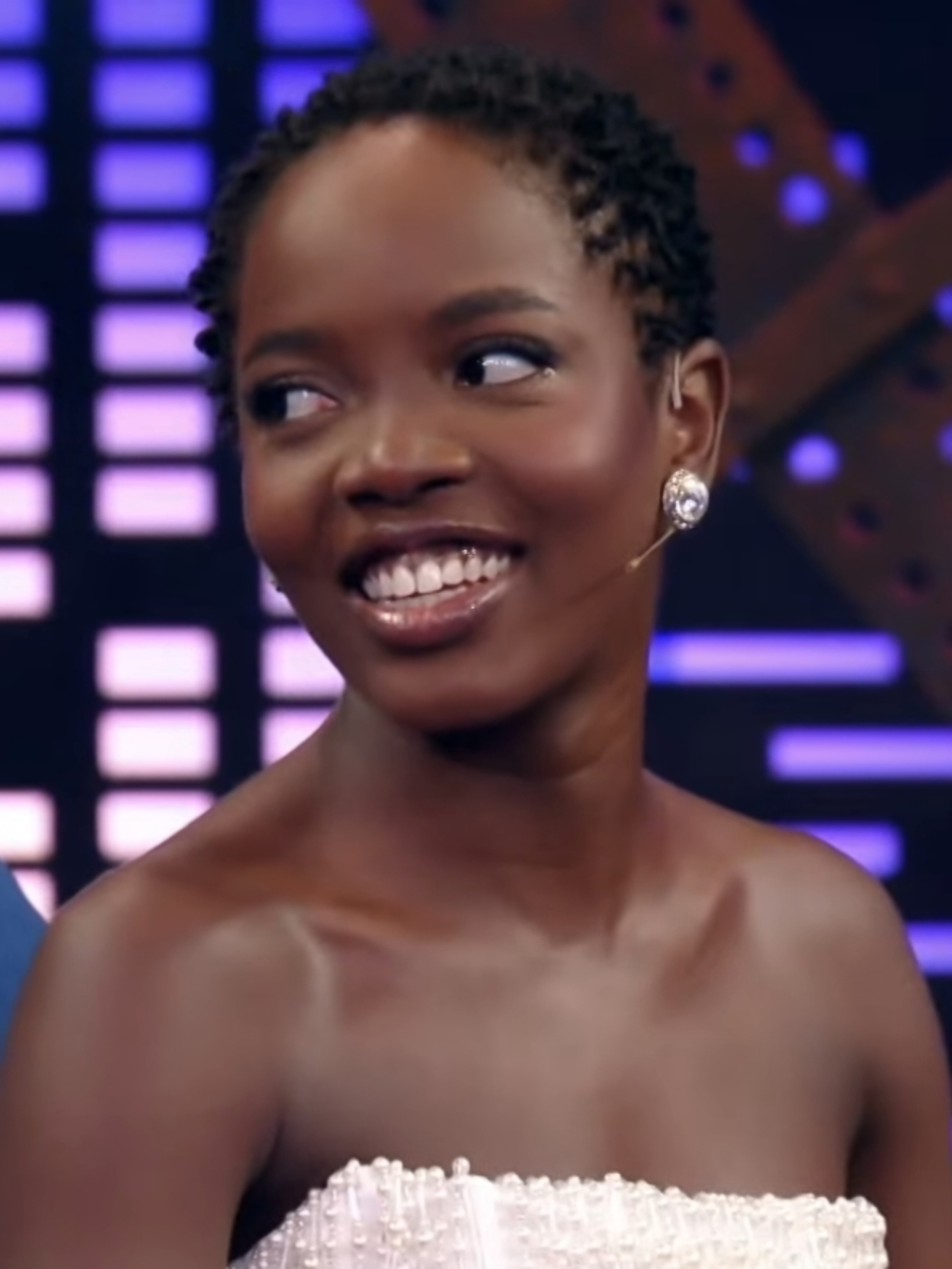
- Clara in 2024 during an interview.
- Born: Clara Onyinyechukwu Mariano Moneke; 16 December 1998 (age 27); São Paulo, Brazil
- Citizenship: Brazil; Nigeria
- Occupations: Actress; model
- Years active: 2022–present
- Notable work: Kate in Vai na Fé

Clara Onyinyechukwu Mariano Moneke (Brazilian Portuguese: [ˈklaɾɐ moˈnɛki]; born 16 December 1998) is a Brazilian actress and model. She gained notoriety when playing the character Kate in the soap opera Vai na Fé, on TV Globo.

== Biography ==
Clara Moneke was born in the Santa Cecília neighborhood, in São Paulo, but moved to Campo Grande, West Zone of Rio de Janeiro, at the age of four. She is the daughter of a Brazilian mother and a Nigerian father. Clara's mother, Marilene Pereira Mariano, died in 2020 due to a stroke.

== Career ==
She began studying theater at the age of seven. She studied costume design and clowning. After ten years of dedication to the artistic profession, in 2017 Clara decided to enter the Hospitality Faculty at the Federal Rural University of Rio de Janeiro, in Seropédica.

During an internship, she met singer Marcelo D2, who invited her to audition for the cast of the series Amar é para os fortes, on Prime Video, created by the artist in partnership with Antonia Pellegrino. Filming took place in 2022.

Afterwards, the actress recorded the film Eu Sou Maria, directed by Clara Linhart and with a script by Sônia Rodrigues

Scheduled to premiere in 2023, Clara also participates in the feature film Nosso Sonho, which tells the life of the duo Claudinho & Buchecha. In the film, the actress plays Vanessa, the wife of Claudinho (played by actor Lucas Penteado), who died in 2002.

The role in Vai na Fé came through a message on Instagram, from casting producer Patrícia Rache. In the plot, written by Rosane Svartman, Clara plays the character Kate, a young woman from the Rio suburbs and the opposite of her best friend, Jenifer (Bella Campos). The success was so great that she became one of the most beloved characters by the soap opera audience and was invited to reprise the role in a participation in the series Encantado's. Furthermore, Clara gained more than 500 thousand followers on her social networks.

== Filmography ==
=== Television ===
Year	Title	Role	Notes
2022	Arcanjo Renegado	Aissa Mwale	Episodes: "1" and "2"
2023	Amar é Para os Fortes	Peixe	
2023	Vai na Fé	Kate Cristina Ramos "Katelícia/Kátia"	
2024	Encantado's	Kate Cristina Ramos "Katelícia/Kátia"	Episodes: "O Inimigo Agora é Outro"
2024	No Rancho Fundo	Caridade Rosalina	
2025	Dona de Mim	Leona "Léo" Larissa da Silva Senna	

=== Film ===
Year	Title	Role
2023	Nosso Sonho	Vanessa
2023	Ritmo de Natal	Mileny
2023	Eu Sou Maria	Vanusa

== Awards and nominations ==
Year	Ceremony	Category	Work nominated	Result
2023	SEC Awards	Crush Of The Year	Vai na Fé	Nominated
2023	BreakTudo Awards	National Crush	Vai na Fé	Nominated
2023	Prêmio Geração Glamour	New Actress	Vai na Fé	Won
2023	Acervo Awards	Actress Of The Year	Vai na Fé	Nominated
2023	Acervo Awards	National Highlight	Vai na Fé	Nominated
2023	Acervo Awards	Highlight on Screens	Vai na Fé	Nominated
2023	Acervo Awards	Keep an eye	Vai na Fé	Nominated
2023	Prêmio ArteBlitz de Novela	Best New Actress (popular vote)	Vai na Fé	Won
2023	Prêmio ArteBlitz de Novela	Best New Actress (jury vote)	Vai na Fé	Won
2023	Prêmio ArteBlitz de Novela	Best Couple (with Caio Manhente)	Vai na Fé	Nominated
2023	Splash Awards	Best Newcomer in a Soap Opera	Vai na Fé	Nominated
2023	Splash Awards	Best Performance in a Soap Opera	Vai na Fé	Nominated
2023	Prêmio Potências!	Actress Of The Year	Vai na Fé	Nominated
2023	Melhores do Ano	Revelation of the Year	Vai na Fé	Nominated
2023	Prêmio Área VIP	Media Revelation	Vai na Fé	Nominated
2023	Prêmio Área VIP	Best Character	Vai na Fé	Nominated
2023	Melhores do Ano - Duh Secco	New Actress	Vai na Fé	Won
2023	Prêmio APCA de Televisão	Revelation	Vai na Fé	Nominated
2023	TikTok Awards	TikTok Star	Clara's TikTok	Nominated
2024	Prêmio Potências	Best Supporting Actress Of the Year	No Rancho Fundo	Nominated
