= Bella Campos =

Brazilian actress and model (born 1998)

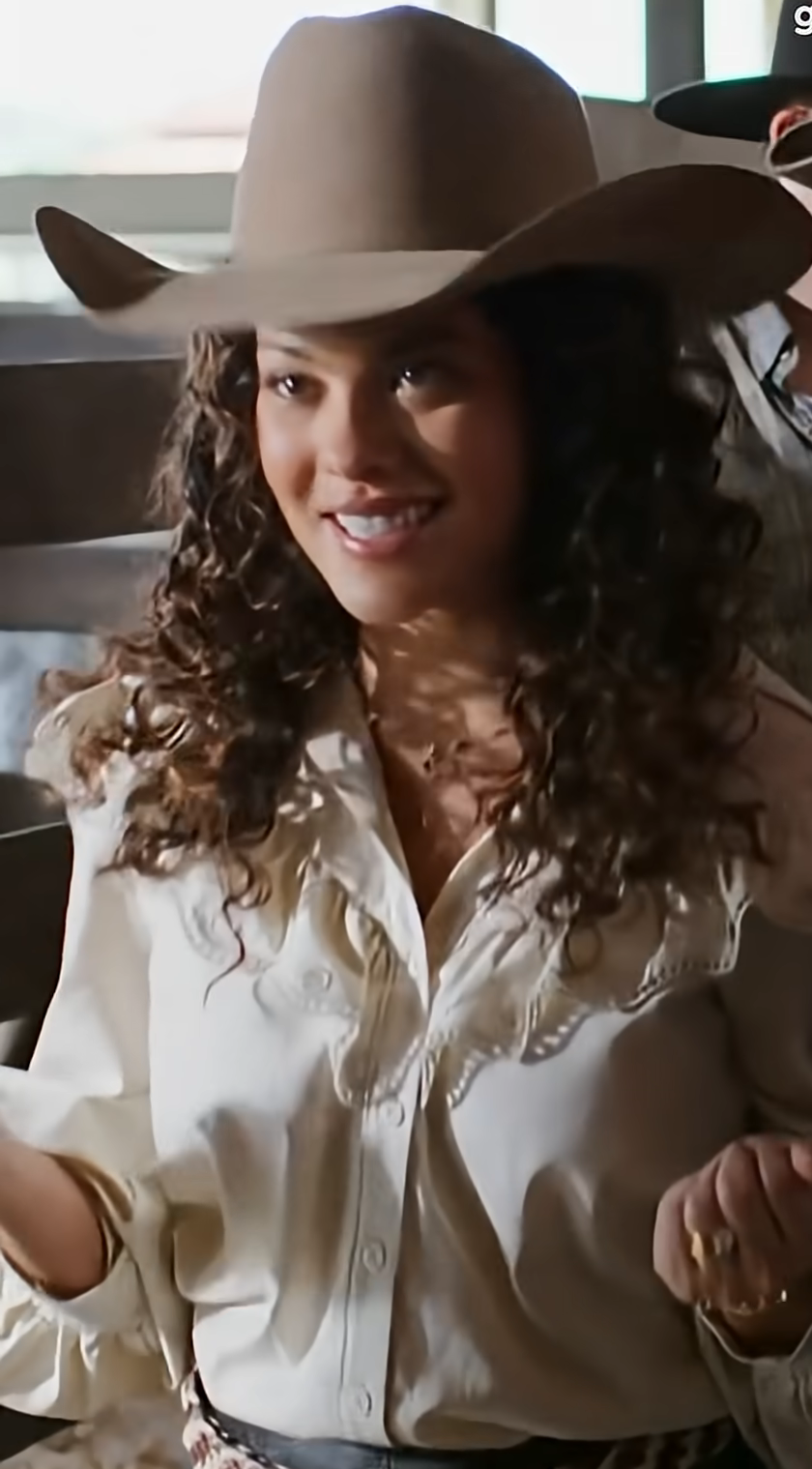
- Campos in the 2025 telenovela Vale Tudo.
- Born: Isabella Karolina de Campos Siqueira Carmo; 13 February 1998 (age 28); Cuiabá, Mato Grosso, Brazil
- Occupations: Actress and model
- Years active: 2022–present
- Height: 162 cm (5 ft 4 in)

Isabella Karolina de Campos Siqueira Carmo (born 13 February 1998), known as Bella Campos, is a Brazilian actress and model who gained notability by portraying the character Muda in Pantanal. Her performance in the role earned her the award for best supporting actress in the 2022 Best of the Year.

== Life and career ==
Bella Campos was born in Cuiabá, capital of Mato Grosso, and moved to Rio de Janeiro when she passed the casting tests for the twenty-eighth season of Malhação, which would premiere in 2020 after the end of the previous season, receiving the title Transformação. However, the soap opera ended up being canceled and in 2022, the actress was cast in the remake of Pantanal, a classic soap opera from the 90s, in the role of Muda, Andréa Richa's role in the first version of the serial, a mysterious woman who arrives in the Pantanal region in search of revenge, and ends up becoming a friend of the protagonist, Juma (Alanis Guillen), and having a relationship with Tibério (Guito). Campos replaced Giullia Buscacio, who played the character but dropped out of the role due to scheduling issues. For her performance in the role, she ended up being nominated for the award for best supporting actress in the Best of the Year 2022, where she competed for the trophy with Bárbara Paz and Camila Morgado, and ended up taking home

Also in 2023, Bella shoots the feature film Cinco Tipos de Medo, directed by Bruno Bini and shot in Cuiabá, her hometown, as well as in several other cities in Mato Grosso. Expected to be released in 2024, the actress shares a scene with the actors Xamã, Bárbara Colen, Rui Ricardo Diaz and João Vitor Silva.

== Filmography ==
=== Television ===
Year	Title	Role	Notes	Ref.
2022	Pantanal	Ruth de Lourdes "Muda"	Co-lead role	
2023	Vai na Fé	Jenifer Daiane "Jeni" da Silva Carvalho	Protagonist	
2024	Corona Luau MTV	Presenter		
2025	Vale Tudo	Maria de Fátima Accioli	Antagonist	

=== Film ===
Year	Title	Role	Notes
2025	Cinco Tipos de Medo	Marlene	

== Awards and nominations ==
Year	Ceremony	Category	Work	Result
2022	Melhores do Ano	Best Supporting Actress	Pantanal	Won
2022	Prêmio Contigo! Online	TV Revelation	Pantanal	Nominated
2022	Prêmio Área VIP	Best Media Breakthrough	Pantanal	Nominated
2022	Prêmio Mundo Negro	Performance of the Year	Pantanal	Nominated
2022	Melhores do Ano - Terra	Best Revelation	Pantanal	Nominated
2023	Troféu Internet	Revelation	Pantanal	Pending
2023	SEC Awards	Crush of the Year	Vai na Fé	Nominated
2023	BreakTudo Awards	National Crush	Vai na Fé	Nominated
2024	IBest Award	Influencer Protagonist	Vai na Fé	Nominated
2024	IBest Award	Mato Grosso Influencer	Bella Campos	Nominated
2025	IBest Award	Influencer Protagonist	Vale Tudo	Pending
