= Charges.com.br =

2000 brazil Comedy website

YouTube information
- Channel: Charges
- Years active: February 2000 - present
- Genres: comedy, animation
- Subscribers: 2.63 million
- Views: 663 million
- Website: charges.com.br

Charges.com.br is a Brazilian humor website, created in February 2000 by the cartoonist Maurício Ricardo Quirino. It consists of animated cartoons made with the Macromedia Flash program. Due to their success, the cartoons are even shown on television stations, such as Rede Globo, which shows every Tuesday on the Big Brother Brasil on a day of elimination.

The charges animadas (see below), which the site presents daily, are the main feature of the site. In addition to these charges animadas, the site has other minor features, such as the piada do dia (joke of the day), which publishes jokes sent by the site's visitors, and the emails comentados (commented emails), in which the site's owner will publish some of the emails sent to the site (which can range from site feedback to relationship advice, to lame jokes and to people sending a message just asking to be published) and add some comments to them. The site also has some Flash-powered games, which were also themed generally on recent events.

In 2006, it won the iBest Prize for Best entertainment site, by popular jury. Since 2012, animations have also been made available through their own YouTube channel. The animations ended in 2022, due to declining popularity and low financial return due to YouTube limitations.

== Charges animadas ==
The term charges animadas can be translated as something along the lines of animated cartoons. However, in Portuguese, the word charge is used to refer to editorial cartoons. These works consist of Flash animations of short length, showing some humorous, generally related to recent events and situations.

=== Charges-okê ===
The term charge-okê is a fusion of the words charge and karaoke, properly adapted to Portuguese. It refers to some of the site's charges animadas that consist on musical parodies of popular music hits. The charges-okê are published about once a week along with other regular charges. The parodies are usually sung by a character who has something to do with the lyrics. For example, Brasileiro e sua consciência - Lonely, published on January 26, 2006, is a parody of the hit Lonely, sung by Akon. The modified lyrics talk about the indecision of a mid-class Brazilian on which candidate to choose in the Brazilian president elections in 2006.

=== Cotidiano ===
Or Everyday Life in the literal translation, is known for its political tone and other elements. Cotidiano is currently available on uol.com.br and on Amazon Prime Video.

=== Tobby Entrevista ===
Or Tobby Interviews in the literal translation, is the way who Mauricio use to criticize and satirize a specific famous person and/or pop culture work, where Tobby, the interviewer (a cynical and sarcastic person with nanism, that uses Jimmy Five's shirt, Mickey Mouse hat and have the "Zacarias bald head") ask questions to the interviewee (who can be a spoof of a person or famous character) where they unintentionally make fun of one another.

In 2007 with the success of film Elite Squad in the country one of the interviewees was Captain Morrimento (a parody of Captain Nascimento), who took over the program (besides lowering Tobby to be his assistant) and changed its name to "Capitão Interroga" (Captain Interrogates), which the Captain interviewed guests often beating them up. In 2008 after some requests Tobby returned to the program, but with the direction of Captain Morrimento (but Morrimento left the program later in 2010).

Tobby Entrevista was eventually canceled in 2019 and Tobby has since made small appearances in other Charges.com.br series.

In 2022, after the character made minor appearances in the other Charges.com.br series, Tobby returned to have a new show called "Tobby Podcast" inspired by YouTube podcast videos for a short time.

=== Espinha e Fimose ===
Or Pimple and Phimosis in the literal translation, is a recurring shown in charges (that satirizes teenager's social acts and behaviors), and the most famous characters in the cast, where 2 teenagers (who share their last) attempt to make sex with attractive girls and/or get some money with they witness scams, but their plans often(though not always) fail, due to they lack of planning or luck.

The series was slowly being discontinued in the late 2010s, mainly in 2020 when crossovers with Só Levando became frequent.

=== Só Levando ===
A web series inspired in American adult family cartoons like The Simpsons about a poor family who lives in a favela known as Morro do Lamento (lit. Hill of the Regrets), headed by a criminal organization. The series is starred by Bezerra, an alcoholic middle-aged man who creates plans to try to get rich and support his wife Bernadete (with whom he has an open relationship), his eldest daughter Suelen (a young adult who pretends to be studying medicine, but in reality works as a prostitute to support the family) and Johan (an adopted German descendant boy who is influenced by Afro-Brazilian culture and raps about social problems).

Among the other characters in the series are Coisa Ruim (a crime boss who works in drug trafficking and acts as the big boss of Lamento), Otoridade (a former police officer who serves Coisa Ruim), Beringela (another of Coisa Ruim's main henchmen), Consuelo (Suelen's best friend who is a transsexual prostitute), Robalho (a corrupt and greedy senator who works in partnership with Coisa Ruim), Juke & Box (Johan's rap friends) and Dona Geralda (a middle aged lady who serves as a running gag due to her bad luck).

=== Tonin ===
Title of the first season.

An anime series centering on the adventures of Tonin, a country boy who becomes "the chosen hero" to be travel in the time to defeat his enemies. In the beginning the shorts was created as a parody the Japanese TV series, such as anime, but with time was approaching subjects increasingly serious though without losing its comedy with the parodies. Lasted four seasons "Tonin, The Ninja Who Came from the Countryside" (2008-2009), "Tonin - The Return of Those Who Were Not" (2009-2010), "Tonin, Ninja From Hell" (2010-2011) and "Tonin - Saga Final" (2012). This was the first series to contain sagas and a final, not returning to production since the end of the fourth season.

After the end of the series the characters were gradually incorporated into the same universe as the other series with very frequent appearances in the latest animations made between 2020 and 2022.

=== Pedreiros Zoeiros ===
Or Mocking Bricklayers in the literal translation, is a sketch series focused on a two bricklayers Pedrão and Jerônimo (the latter usually portrayed as an unseen character) who often make fun of people (usually controversial artists) who often appear walking in front of the construction area where they work.

=== Crossovers ===
In 2013 there was a saga entitled Transando esse Transa, which was a crossover between the series Espinha & Fimose and Só Levando with appearances by characters from Tobby Entrevista and Tonin (in their versions of the dimension created in the epilogue of last season). This saga introduced Dinho Star, a retired 70s rock singer who was an old friend of Bezerra and one of Lesado's fathers. This saga also showed the first meeting between Espinha and Suelen, in addition to introducing Tonin as a wealthy businessman who owns a dairy factory.

Some small crossovers between the series continued to occur in some animations released later, with Espinha still interested in winning the love of Suelen, Espinha meeting Coisa Ruim, Dameshana meeting Maria Joana, some characters appearing a few times in Tobby Entrevista and Pedreiros Zoeiros, and Jerônimo being revealed Bezerra's lost brother.

In 2020 a series divided into 6 seasons entitled Todo Mundo em Casa! (lit. Everybody at Home!) has been published. The series not only brought together Espinha & Fimose, Só Levando, Tonin, Pedreiros Zoeiros and Tobby Entrevista (Tobby now unemployed) again, but it reconnected some events that occurred in the Tonin series and connected them to the other series, like: Coisa Ruim and Lesado being old friends, the origin of the Coisa Ruim's evil and Lesado's mental problem is that they met the Oracle in the past which made Lesado gain infinite knowledge and Coisa Ruim be possessed by Vilano-san, Tonin from the original timeline and Aparecido traveling in time, Tonin from the new timeline still having the "chosen one" status and able to summon the Oracle, in addition to the existence of another dimension from which Dameshana changed the life of the Bezerra family for the better.

Crossovers were frequent until the last animation released in 2022 called Adeus (lit. Goodbye), where an end-of-the-world arc occurs with Earth being destroyed by a meteor called Shorts (a reference to YouTube Shorts) making an analogy to the decline in popularity of the animations after they were moved to YouTube with constant demonetization due to the mature content in many of the animations even with Mauricio Ricardo trying to diminish the mature content over time.

== Characters ==
=== Tobby ===
Tobby: Whose real name is Tobias, is the website interviewer from the Tobby Entrevista series, famous by his ridiculous clothes; obnoxious and sardonic personality; and usual lack of luck. His main job is interviewing (and annoying) his guests, something that usually end up in Tobby being either humiliated or physically harmed. He wears a Mickey Mouse hat and a similar shirt to the Jimmy Five (Monica's Gang). The character remained in his role as an interviewer until 2019, when the Tobby Entrevista was canceled, according to the character due to the decline in the audience of his show. After that Tobby only returned making small appearances in the series Pedreiros Zoeiros, until in 2020 he was moved to become a regular character in crossovers with Só Levando, becoming a resident of Lamento and at first working at the pirate radio on the hill until becoming one of Coisa Ruim's henchmen. As Coisa Ruim's henchman, Tobby has bonded with the alter ego "Sr. K" (wearing a Guy Fawkes mask and wig inspired by V for Vendetta) pretending to be the leader of Kuduro Hill which was also in possession of Coisa Ruim, but unknowingly. However, as Sr. K he ended up showing mental problems and madness to the point of considering his alter ego as a real person until in the 2021 saga Natal Louco he was captured and hospitalized in an asylum where it was revealed that he always suffered madness for believing that his interviewees (including fictional from films and cartoons) were real. After being released from asylum Tobby returned to appear in 2022 in a new podcast series called Tobby Podcast.

Capitão Morrimento: A spoof of Capitão Nascimento from the film Tropa de Elite, known for being a straight and practical, but also rather than an amoral, violent and short-tempered cop. right after Tobby point out some advantages over his job, Morrimento become delightful and forces Tobby to give his job to him, but Morrimento eventually gets tired of his job as an interviewer and gets out of it. unfortunately to Tobby, Morrimento become the director of his program, constantly scolding and nagging both Tobby and the guests even for the slight. Fortunately, Internet users eventually grew weary of Morrimento and forced him to withdraw from the program, but he still makes occasional appearances on the site. He seems to be superhumanly strong, having once single-handed stopped Superman from fly away, and even the Hulk could barely support his slaps over his head. The character continued to appear with Tobby until 2010, already at colonel status (as shown in Tropa de Elite 2) with his last appearance in 2011 in a saga of his own in London. The character was initially considered real within the Charges.com.br canon until 2022 saga Natal Louco where it is revealed that (like all of Tobby's other interviewees) he was just a figment of Tobby's imagination since Tobby suffered from madness.

=== Espinha e Fimose ===
Espinha and Fimose: Two teenagers who always try to have sex with some girl whom they consider "hot", but rarely do well in this task. Espinha (literally, Pimple) has this name due to his '"pimple fashion", and is known by his navie and inattentive personality, and by his poor grades. Fimose (literally, Phimosis)(who has this name due to his pink cap) on the other hand, while not much more intelligent or responsible than Espinha, is the straight man from the duo, and the unofficial leader.

Lesado: Whose name means "(mentally) injured" in Portuguese, is a mentally affected 40-year-old man, that is friends with Espinha and Fimose, who cannot discern reality from fantasy due his abuse in use drugs and suffer of frequents lapses of memory. Despite his mental instability, Lesado is straightforward person, being well aware of his condition and being an honest and intelligent (though deranged) guy, or was Espinha and Fimose claims, he is "crazy, but not stupidy!". He is often characterized by his weakened appearance with muscle and movement problems and often wears a Gentle Giant green t-shirt. A running gag involving him is that he is that he never refer people by the right name, usually reversing the names Espinha and Fimose or calling Lipo a "chubby boy who doesn't remember his name". . According to Mauricio Ricardo, Lesado was inspired by a co-worker. At first Lesado was introduced as a neighbor of Espinha and Fimose called Eduardo, but the name was quickly forgotten. In later years the character was renamed Diego Arnaldo (in honor of Diego Maradona and Arnaldo Baptista, for having already been involved with drugs). Over the years, the character has gained more prominence, with his parents revealed in the 2013 saga Transando essa Transa being the son of the singers of the old band Alfa Sigma (who derived his full name Eduardo Diego Arnaldo) and also being a youth friend of Coisa Ruim from Só Levando series in the 2020 saga Todo Mundo em Casa!, where it was also revealed that Lesado's mental problems are not due to his high consumption of drugs but because he received infinite knowledge from the Oracle from Tonin series. Lesado also proclaims himself as the main enemy of the Inca Venusians (reference in the villains of National Kid) who according to him aim to use their high wisdom to conquer the world, including having a chip implanted in his brain. In old animations it was believed that they were just a figment of imagination based on Lesado's childhood, but since Todo Mundo em Casa! the Inca Venusians have been revealed to be real and in a parallel timeline Lesado became a hero of Earth in the distant future.

Lipo: A naive, awkward friend of Espinha and Fimose. He seems to be quittenly dim-witted, often misinterprets what the others say to him and has very low grades (even though he has more detication in his studies than Espinha and Fimose). Regardless to this, Lipo is, in contrary to Lesado, "stupid, but not crazy" being well aware of his surroundings and of his limitations, indicating that he is more straightforward than he appears to be. despite being less experienced in pick-up arts, Lipo has much more success and luck in this area than Espinha and Fimose.

Vera Diva: An intelligent and serious teenager who is on friendly terms with Espinha and Fimose, but doesn't hide her displeasure over their immaturity.

=== Tonin ===
Tonin: A boy who was the protagonist of his own series. He was born on a farm as the first of several children of her greedy father Tião Dois Dentes (lit: Tiao Two Teeth), at 12 years old he was sold to two ninjas of feudal Japan to save the past of a villain. During his adventures he was gaining new allies, powers in hell a ninja half brother, a girlfriend former-villain and plus travel time several times. At the end of the story he dies, but is saved in an alternative version of the future going to be a normal boy from the country.

Vilano-san: The main villain of the Tonin series. He is an ex-ninja who is a sorcerer from Feudal Japan and an old rival of Pai-Meio (from which he cut off his legs in the past) who was responsible for tormenting the village of Pai-Meio until the arrival of Tonin who was chosen by Pai-Meio to defeat Vilano. Vilano was introduced as a powerful sorcerer who had immortality after winning a duel against the Oracle in the past that made him become invulnerable to everything except dairy products. Vilano is killed by Tonin at the end of the first season after having his skull destroyed by Tonin's hard cheeses, however, he is resurrected by Oracle without his invulnerability. At the end of the second season it is revealed that he is Tonin's biological father. In the third season he allies himself with Pai-Meio and dies definitively at the end of the season, at the same time that he is revealed as Aparecido's biological father.

Pai-Meio: The ninja master father of all the members of the "Brotherhood of the Black Ninjas" who was responsible for choosing Tonin to save his village from Vilano-san. He is a spoof of the character Pai Mei. He was introduced in the first season serving as Tonin's master and guardian during his stay in feudal Japan, having trained him to become a ninja and defeat Vilano, however at the end of the same season he ends up betraying Tonin revealing himself to be a tyrannical leader after Vilano's first defeat abusing his power of having several the ninja sons to dominate the village. He received the title Pai-Meio (literally Half-Father in Portuguese) after being betrayed by his old college friends Vilano and Mipussy having his legs cut off by Vilano in the last test. It is usually seen getting around with a small wooden cart, but he is also able to float, having learned this skill through books. In the third season he returns as one of the main antagonists, allying himself with Vilano to try to defeat Tonin together, but just like Vilano he fails and dies being taken with him to hell.

Dameshana: One of Tonin's allies. At first she was introduced as a demonic vampire (which look was a reference to Morrigan Aensland of Darkstalkers) serving as Vilano-san's henchman who during the first season acted as a secondary antagonist for Tonin helping Vilano-san. However, from the second season onwards she allied herself with Tonin becoming a full human at the end of the third season. At the end of the fourth season after making a pact with the Devil she is responsible for altering the course of Tonin's timeline at present, preventing him from becoming a time-traveling ninja and managing to advance in time to marry Tonin as an adult.

Tião Dois Dentes: Tonin's father who was responsible for raising him with Creusa during his childhood until he sold him to Pai-Meio for a golden bar. He is characterized as a greedy, irresponsible and stupid caipira. He was a secondary protagonist during the first season where he used the gold bar to buy and surround the beaches in Barra da Tijuca and later entered into business with politicians in Rio de Janeiro until he became governor of Rio de Janeiro and divorced Creusa in the meantime having only Aparecido as his only son. In the second season he acts as the main antagonist with Aparecido after Tonin returns to Brazil in 2016 (10 years after his departure) where Tonin discovers that Tião has become a corrupt and criminal politician who aims to become president of Brazil.

Aparecido: Tonin's younger brother and one of the main villains. At first he was introduced as a baby in the first season, being the youngest son of Tião and Creusa in 2006. He starts to have a greater focus on the plot from the second season, where after 10 years it is revealed that he was Tião's only son left (after he became governor in Rio de Janeiro) becoming a mean and violent boy that becomes Tonin's enemy aiming to become Tião Dois Dentes's only heir. In the third season he discovers the space-time portal and travels to Feudal Japan for the first time where he meets Pai-Meio and Vilano-san. After Aparecido kills Vilano-san at the end of this season, he ends up lost by space-time (because Kaipiro messed up in his calculations) returning in the fourth season as an old man (claiming to be Vilano-san's successor) having learned witchcraft during his decades traveling through space-time. He tries to get revenge on Tonin, but ends up being killed with him at the end of the season. Dameshana subsequently prevents his birth in the new timeline.

Oracle: an omnipotent spirit who was responsible for giving semi-immortality to Vilano-san and also choosing Tonin as the hero of time-space who would defeat Vilano-san for Pai-Meio. He has the appearance of a floating elderly black man with a pipe, a straw hat and no visible legs. Oracle has also had appearances in other series on Charges.com.br, most notably appearing in the 2020 series "Todo Mundo em Casa!" where it is revealed that he was responsible for giving infinite wisdom to Lesado and Vilano's evil essence to Coisa Ruim in their past. He often appears to those who are knowledgeable and connected to him such as Tonin, Pai-Meio, Vilano-san and (more recently) Coisa Ruim and Lesado.

=== Só Levando ===
José Bezerra: Usually referred to by his last name, he is the patriarch of the Bezerra family. A resident of a poor community in Morro do Lamento who frequently creates plans and swindles in order to become rich and lift his family out of poverty, although his plans to get rich often fail, most of the time because his plans always have flaws or bad luck. The character serves as an equivalent to Homer Simpson often appearing with a new job with each episode, besides also being an alcoholic. Bezerra and his family continued to live in Lamento until the 2022 saga "Famoso Quem", where he becomes a celebrity by chance after discovering that he has already known Anitta in the past, starting to work as an influencer on internet and living in a house outside the favela.

Suelen: The eldest daughter of the Bezerra family. A young adult who claims to study and take medical courses, when in reality she secretly works as a prostitute without her family knowing it and taking advantage of this work to raise money to support her family. She dreamed of being a doctor since childhood, but gave up due to a childhood trauma after seeing the dead bodies of Johan's parents in her house developing hematophobia. Over time, she developed a love for Coisa Ruim, who eventually became not only her biggest client, but also a love interest. However, when the crossovers started, she began to develop a romance with Espinha, thus forming a love triangle, but by the end of the series she stays with Espinha. Suelen continued working as a prostitute until "Famoso Quem" when he discovered that someone else managed to graduate from medical school using his identity, later going on to work as a therapist in "Terapeuta Quântica".

Johan: The youngest and adopted son of the Bezerra family. He is of German descent and is the son of the late Nazi criminal Fritz Schneider, however, due to his strong interest in Afro-Brazilian culture, he refuses to believe that he is of German descent and prefers to believe that he has African descent (but over the course of the episodes this stopped happening, probably because Johan got over this interest). His main hobby is rapping and aspires to be a famous rapper with his friends Juke and Box without success. Despite being just a child, he often proves to be mature and serious. and often raps by social critics. His full name is Johan Routen Schneider.

Bernadete: Bezerra's wife. She has an open relationship with her husband and just like Suelen she sometimes goes into prostitution in order to support the family. She doesn't have a good relationship with Bezerra, normally being rude and severe with her husband, especially when he is in his plans to get rich without success. She is characterized by always wearing clothes with jaguar skin and sometimes smoking cigarettes.

Coisa Ruim: The rich big boss of Morro do Lamento and the main antagonist of the series. He acts as a leader for Lamento, leading all criminals and residing in a mansion in the top of the hill which previously belonged to former leader Fritz Schneider. He has as main allies Otoridade and Beringela, and having rivalry against the Captain Nascimorto who seeks to capture Coisa Ruim and end his drug trafficking scheme. His real name is Carlos Roberto Dias (nicknamed Carlinhos in his youth), but he changed his name to Cristiano Ronaldo Schneider (named after the Portuguese footballer, and sometimes being referred to simply as "C.R.") when he decided to devote himself to the criminal world. He has a tragic past, having lost his family in childhood and separated from his sister Nair Dias. In his younger years he was best friends with Diego Arnaldo (Lesado) who encouraged him to ingest a mushroom that eventually led them to the Oracle that granted Coisa Ruim the evil essence of Vilano-san (after being temporarily possessed by his spirit) which resulted in Coisa Ruim forget about his tragic past and become the current criminal he is now. Despite being considered the main villain in the series, he is not at all evil, as he often comes to help the Bezerra family and related to escape problems. During the episodes he developed a love interest for Suelen to the point of showing a slight rivalry with Espinha for it, but later he stops having relations with Suelen.

Otoridade: One of Coisa Ruim's main henchmen. An ex-cop but still dressed in a police uniform who is primarily responsible for deceiving and stealing information from the police. He also often collects taxes from the residents of Lamento under Coisa Ruim's orders and consequently punishes the residents if necessary. Over time, the character revealed himself to be an unfaithful and betrayed servant of Coisa Ruim, aiming to conspire to overcome his boss, which is very explicit in the saga Todo Mundo em Casa! where in an alternate timeline he would have even killed Johan, but eventually his alternate universe version ends up being murdered by the main universe's Coisa Ruim. He is murdered by Beringela in the last saga Adeus during the end of the world.

Beringela: Another of Coisa Ruim's main henchmen. An Afro-Brazilian man, who in the past used to work for Fritz Schneider as well as Coisa Ruim and remained in crime at Lamento even after Coisa Ruim took his place as crime boss. In the past he had a romantic relationship with Johan's mother which probably led to Johan's interest in Afro-Brazilian culture as he grew up. Unlike Otoridade he has shown not to be really evil since in the saga Todo Mundo em Casa! it is revealed that in an alternate timeline created by Dameshana he had left Lamento with Johan's mother, eventually becoming the boy's father and supporting him in his artistic career in Europe.

Consuelo: Born as Donizete, she is Suelen's best friend being a transsexual prostitute who also lives in Lamento. She was kicked out of her home in her teens after being rejected by her parents when she changed her gender and went to live in the favela. She met Suelen when she started working at the La Cattin brothel. She has a love relationship with Robalhinho which Robalho disapproves of and tries to hide from the public. Consuelo remained working at the brothel until the saga "A Vida Continua" when she was hired to hosting the TV news replacing Ruthinha Shariar.

Juke and Box: Two Afro-Brazilian twin boys who are the rap friends of Johan and also residents of Lamento. They often accompany Johan on his raps usually assisting him in beatboxing. Just like Otoridade, their real names are unknown, being often referred to by nicknames created by Bezerra. They have a mother named Dona Vitrola (lit.: Mrs. Record Player). Outside of rap, they demonstrate high knowledge of computers and the internet, occasionally helping residents of Lamento to look for information.

Dona Geralda: A running gag character. A middle-aged woman who is a neighbor of the Bezerra family and often suffers from bad luck. In each episode she is often seen being accidentally attacked, framed, or publicly humiliated, which leads the characters to frequently say "Poor Dona Geralda". Another running gag involving her is that Geralda is never seen speaking at any time, only giving a cry of despair and usually talking off screen.

Anselmo: a bartender who lives in Lamento and who has Bezerra as his main client. He owns his own bar which is often frequented by the characters. He does not have a good friendship with Bezerra, as Bezerra usually tricks Anselmo and even asks him for help in his schemes to get rich. He is characterized by having a nasal voice.

Robalho: The corrupt and greedy senator from Urbanópolis who is one of Coisa Ruim's main allies. He is a reference to corrupt and greedy politicians who launder money, since his name is a pun with "roubar" (steal in Portuguese). He is the father of Robalhinho and disapproves of his son's love for Consuelo, being also a conservative politician.

Robalhinho: Robalho's son. Unlike his father, he is a good person and also has a love relationship with Consuelo, being pansexual. Because Robalho cares a lot for him he is usually targeted for kidnapping by Coisa Ruim's henchmen usually to use him as an instrument of bribery or just punish Robalho when he tries to go against Coisa Ruim's orders.

Ruthinha Shariar: A journalist with a squeaky voice who works hosting a news show for Rede Cubo (a spoof of Rede Globo) normally giving the news about Urbanópolis. She is a spoof of Rachel Sheherazade. She used to present the TV news until the saga "A Vida Continua" when Consuelo took her place in the host of the program causing Ruthinha to be demoted to another TV show, since then, she started acting as an antagonist for Consuelo, aiming to make her lose her job.

Captain Nascimorto: The captain of the Urbanópolis police battalion, who, like Morrimento, is also a spoof of Capitão Nascimento from the film Tropa de Elite. He is Coisa Ruim's main rival, wanting to capture him to put an end to his drug trafficking scheme. Just like Morrimento he is also characterized by his aggressive and threatening behavior, also being a humorous spoof of Nascimento's personality.

=== Other characters ===
Dinho Star: One of Lesado's 3 parents and former lead singer of the seventies rock band Alfa Sigma. In his youth he was a famous and popular singer and also a friend of Bezerra, until he disappeared from the media shortly after the birth of his son. Dinho marked his debut in the crossover saga Transando esse Transa in 2013, remaining since then in the core of characters. His real name is Arnaldo and together with the names of his deceased bandmates they form Lesado's full name.

Pedrão: A bricklayer with a mineiro accent who works for Odebroxa and is known to often mock people who appear walking in front of the construction site being accompanied by Jerônimo. He usually mocks people first by speaking exactly words that might make them angry (and pretending to be talking without noticing the person is around) and then disguises saying that he wasn't actually referring to such a person, but talking about something else and then disguises it by saying that he wasn't actually referring to such a person but talking about something else entirely and claiming to be in favor of the person he's mocking and making the person think that he had judged Pedrão wrong. He is married and is Pietra's father.

Jerônimo: Pedrão's co-worker, usually being portrayed as an unseen character in most episodes in which he appears. He often stays on the slab above helping Pedrão to make fun of the people who appear walking in front of the construction site where they work, however unlike Pedrão he tends to be naive and often does what Pedrão says. With time it was revealed that Jerônimo was the lost brother of Bezerra, who ended up losing memory after an accident in the past and had been found dead when in fact he had been found by Pedrão, with whom he started to live (curiously he appeared in the old episodes of Só Levando as an easter egg character in the backgrounds).

Pietra: Pedro's daughter. A rebellious and treacherous young woman who aspires to be a funk singer and often cheats on other people. She is also revealed to be bisexual. Pietra was a regular character until the 2020 saga Todo Mundo em Casa! where after trying to trick Otoridade into stealing her money, she was almost killed by the same with a shot in the face, but managed to survive losing only one eye and since then starting to adhere another identity for security reasons.

Incas Venusianos: A loose reference to the eponymous villains from the Japanese series National Kid, they are an alien race that Lesado often claims the existence of and tries to warn his friends of his plans to try to take over Earth. Lesado considers them his greatest enemies, having been responsible for abducting him once and implanting a chip in his brain in order to be able to control his vast intelligence to dominate the Earth. According to Lesado the Incas Venusianos have plans for world domination using media communications such as the National Kid series itself (according to him having manipulated the minds of the show's writers) in the 60s and also the children's series Teletubbies in the 90s. At first they were believed to be just a figment of Lesado's imagination (as well as the chip idea) due to his excessive drug consumption and remembering things from his childhood, but in the 2020 saga Todo Mundo em Casa they were revealed to be real including nearly taking over Earth in a parallel timeline created by Dameshana with only Tonin, Dameshana, Coisa Ruim and Aparecido coming to believe in their existence, the latter even having come into direct contact with them during their time-space travels.
