= Monologue =

Speech presented by a single character

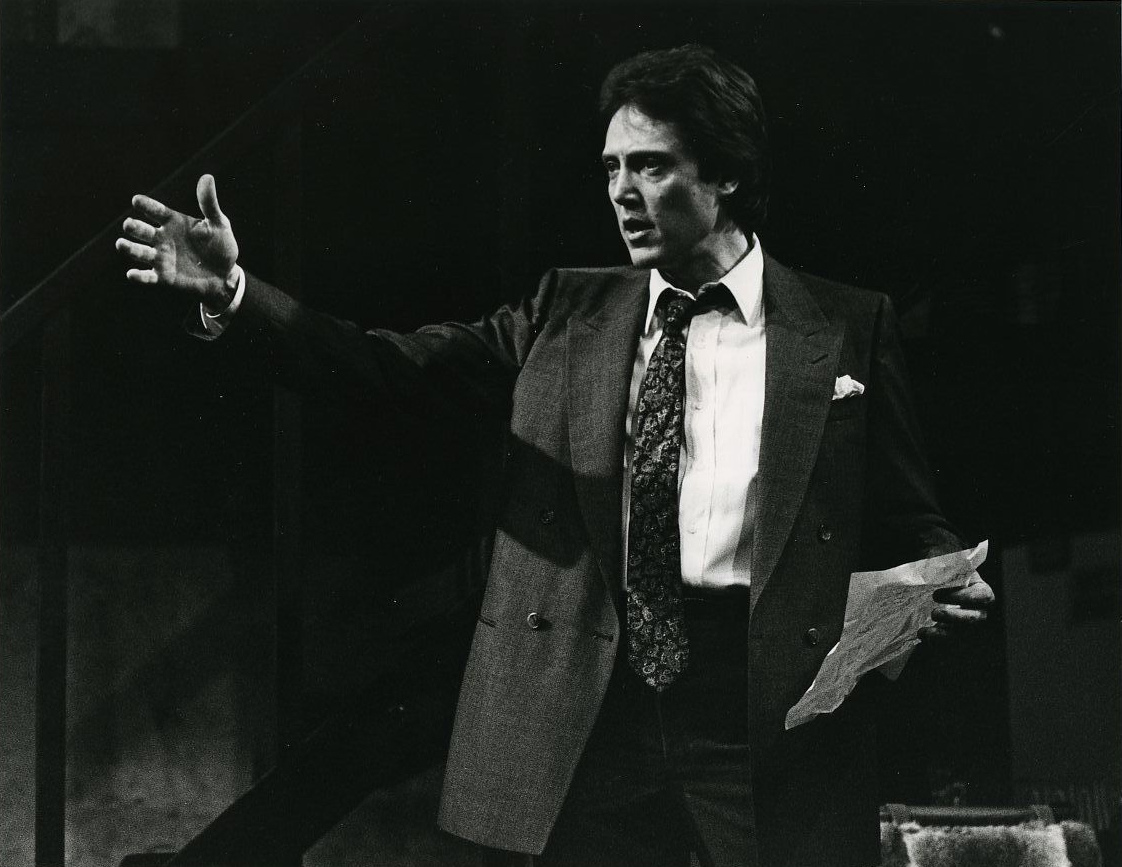
Actor Christopher Walken performing a monologue in the 1984 stage play Hurlyburly

In theatre, a monologue (also spelled monolog in American English) (in Greek: μονόλογος, from μόνος mónos, "alone, solitary" and λόγος lógos, "speech") is a speech presented by a single character, most often to express their thoughts aloud, though sometimes also to directly address another character or the audience. Monologues are common across the range of dramatic media (plays, films, etc.), as well as in non-dramatic media such as poetry, and stand-up comedy. Monologues share much in common with several other literary devices including soliloquies, apostrophes, and asides. There are, however, distinctions between each of these devices.

== Similar literary devices ==
Monologues are similar to poems, epiphanies, and others, in that, they involve one 'voice' speaking but there are differences between them. For example, a soliloquy involves a character relating their thoughts and feelings to themself and to the audience without addressing any of the other characters. A monologue is the thoughts of a person spoken out loud. Monologues are also distinct from apostrophes, in which the speaker or writer addresses an imaginary person, inanimate object, or idea. Asides differ from each of these not only in length (asides are shorter) but also in that asides are not heard by other characters even in situations where they logically should be (e.g. two characters engaging in a dialogue interrupted by one of them delivering an aside).

== History ==
In ancient Greek theatre, the origin of western drama, the conventional three actor rule was preceded by a two-actor rule, which was itself preceded by a convention in which only a single actor would appear on stage, along with the chorus. The origin of the monologue as a dramatic device, therefore, is not rooted in dialogue. It is, instead, the other way around; dialogue evolved from the monologue.

Ancient Roman theatre featured monologues extensively, more commonly than either Ancient Greek theatre or modern theatre. One of the key purposes of these monologues was to indicate the passage of significant amounts of time (that would be tedious to actually play out in real time) within scenes. This type of monologue is referred to as a linking monologue. Other monologue types included "entrance monologues" and exit monologues. In each of these cases a primary function is indicating the passage of time.

From Renaissance theatre onward, monologues generally focused on characters using the extended speech to pursue their dramatic need. Postmodern theatre, on the other hand, often embraces the performative aspects of the monologue, even to the point of challenging the boundary between character portrayal (e.g. acting) and autobiographical speeches.

== Types ==
Example of a dramatic monologue by Rafael Baronesi

Interior monologues involve a character externalizing their thoughts so that the audience can witness experiences that would otherwise be mostly internal. In contrast, a dramatic monologue involves one character speaking to another character. Monologues can also be divided along the lines of active and narrative monologues. In an active monologue a character is using their speech to achieve a clear goal. Narrative monologues simply involve a character telling a story and can often be identified by the fact that they are in the past tense.

== Auditions ==
Actors in theatre, and sometimes in film and television, may be asked to deliver monologues in auditions. Audition monologues demonstrate an actor's ability to prepare a piece and deliver a performance. These pieces are usually limited to two minutes or less and are often paired with a contrasting monologue: comic and dramatic; classical and contemporary. The choice of monologues for an audition often depends on the play or role.

== See also ==
- Dramatic monologue
- Internal monologue
- One-person show
- Oratory
- Performance poetry
- Rhetoric
- Stand-up comedy
- Storytelling
- Diseuse
- Spoken word
