= Benefits with Friends =

- Genre: Romantic comedy
- Created by: Matheus Souza
- Developed by: Matheus Souza
- Directed by: René Sampaio; Matheus Souza
- Starring: Bruna Marquezine; Sérgio Malheiros; Danilo Mesquita; Malu Rodrigues; Rayssa Bratillieri; Sophia Abrahão; João Guilherme; Rômulo Estrela; Clarice Falcão; Gleici Damasceno; Alanis Guillen
- Country of origin: Brazil
- Original language: Portuguese
- No. of seasons: 1
- No. of episodes: 10

Production
- Production location: Rio de Janeiro
- Camera setup: Single-camera
- Running time: 30 minutes

Original release
- Network: Disney+, Hulu
- Release: November 22, 2024 – present

Benefits with Friends (Portuguese: Amor da Minha Vida) is a Brazilian television series. The first season premiered on 22 November 2024, streaming on Disney+ in Brazil and on Hulu in the United States.

Created by Matheus Souza, the series is written by him in collaboration with Juliana Araripe, Luiza Fazio, Bryan Ruffo and Nátaly Neri. It is directed by René Sampaio and Tatiana Fragoso, with artistic direction by Souza and co-direction by Bruna Marquezine.

The main cast includes Bruna Marquezine, Sérgio Malheiros, Danilo Mesquita, Malu Rodrigues, Rayssa Bratillieri, Sophia Abrahão, João Guilherme and Agda Couto.

== Plot ==
Bia (Bruna Marquezine) and Victor (Sérgio Malheiros) are inseparable best friends who share their most intimate secrets. While Victor feels trapped in a long-term relationship that has lost its spark, Bia engages in brief and varied romances, always maintaining a skeptical view of love. As Bia distances herself from the idea of a great romance and drifts into fleeting relationships, Victor finds himself stagnant in an old, monotonous relationship. Amid disappointments with other people, the two eventually discover a spark in their friendship that leads to a new and unexpected romance.

== Cast ==
Actor/Actress	Character	Seasons	
Actor/Actress	Character	1st (2024)	2nd (2026)
Bruna Marquezine	Bianca Martins (Bia)		
Sérgio Malheiros	Victor Ferreira		
Danilo Mesquita	Marcelo Duarte		
Rayssa Bratillieri	Paula Brás		
Sophia Abrahão	Giselle Lopes		
Cissa Guimarães	Neide Martins		
Agda Couto	Érica		
Pâmela Morais	Helena		
Malu Rodrigues	Luiza Nunes		—N/a
João Guilherme	Gabriel Monteiro		—N/a
Fernanda Paes Leme	Alice Santos		—N/a
David Reis	Pedro		—N/a
João Villa	César Soares		—N/a
Alanis Guillen		—N/a	
Romulo Estrela		—N/a	
Clarice Falcão		—N/a	
Gleici Damasceno		—N/a	
Maria Ribeiro		—N/a	
Gabriel Godoy		—N/a	

=== Special appearances ===
Actor/Actress	Character
Season 1
Ana Hikari	Júlia Maia
Isabela Souza	Catarina Malheiros
Mariana Molina	Marina Lélis
Bruno Ahmed	Thiago
Bruno Padilha	Claudio Lemos
Priscilla Rozenbaum	Sílvia
Hamilton Dias	Beto
Caíque Nogueira	Gabriel Marques
Nicolas Ahnert	Felipe
Thalita Meneghim	Jade
Season 2
Daniel Dantas	
Guida Viana	
Louise Cardoso	
Pablo Morais	
Priscilla Reis	
Hugo Bonemer	

== Production ==
On 4 April, it was announced that Bruna Marquezine would star in a series for Star+, and the teaser was posted on both the actress's social media and the production’s official pages. Shortly after, Sérgio Malheiros was also announced as co-lead. Agda Couto, fresh from Dois Tempos, joined the cast as well. Over the following weeks, additional cast members were confirmed, including Ana Hikari, who had recently left Globo and signed on for her first project outside the network, and Isabela Souza, who returned to Brazil after starring in Bia. Cissa Guimarães was also confirmed, returning to acting 12 years after Salve Jorge.

Filming began in May and lasted 70 days. During production, further cast announcements were made, including Danilo Mesquita, Malu Rodrigues, Sophia Abrahão, João Villa, Rayssa Bratillieri, David Reis and Bryan Ruffo. Special appearances by João Guilherme and Fernanda Paes Leme were also confirmed.

In March 2025, the series was renewed for a second season after the first achieved international success on Hulu. The renewal was confirmed by Marquezine herself in an interview with Vogue Brasil. On 14 May, script readings for the second season began, confirming the return of Sophia Abrahão, Danilo Mesquita and Rayssa Bratillieri. Meanwhile, Fernanda Paes Leme, João Guilherme, and Malu Rodrigues exited the show to pursue other projects. New cast members announced for the second season included Rômulo Estrela, Clarice Falcão, Gleici Damasceno, and Alanis Guillen.

During production, Pablo Morais, Gabriel Godoy, Hugo Bonemer, and Maria Ribeiro were also officially confirmed.
