= Prêmio Extra de Televisão de melhor série =

- Awarded for: Best Series/Miniseries
- Country: Brazil
- Presented by: Jornal Extra
- First award: 2004
- Currently held by: Justiça (2016)

The Prêmio Extra de Televisão de melhor série (English: Extra Television Awards for Best Series/Miniseries) is a category of the Prêmio Extra de Televisão, destined to be the best drama series on Brazilian television.

== Winner ==
- 2004 – Carga Pesada
- 2005 – A Grande Família
- 2006 – A Grande Família
- 2007 – A Grande Família
- 2008 – Toma Lá, Dá Cá
- 2009 – Maysa: Quando Fala o Coração
- 2010 – A Grande Família
- 2011 – Tapas & Beijos
- 2012 – Tapas & Beijos
- 2013 – Tapas & Beijos
- 2014 – Amores Roubados
- 2015 – Felizes para Sempre?
- 2016 – Justiça
