= Malu Rodrigues =

Brazilian actress

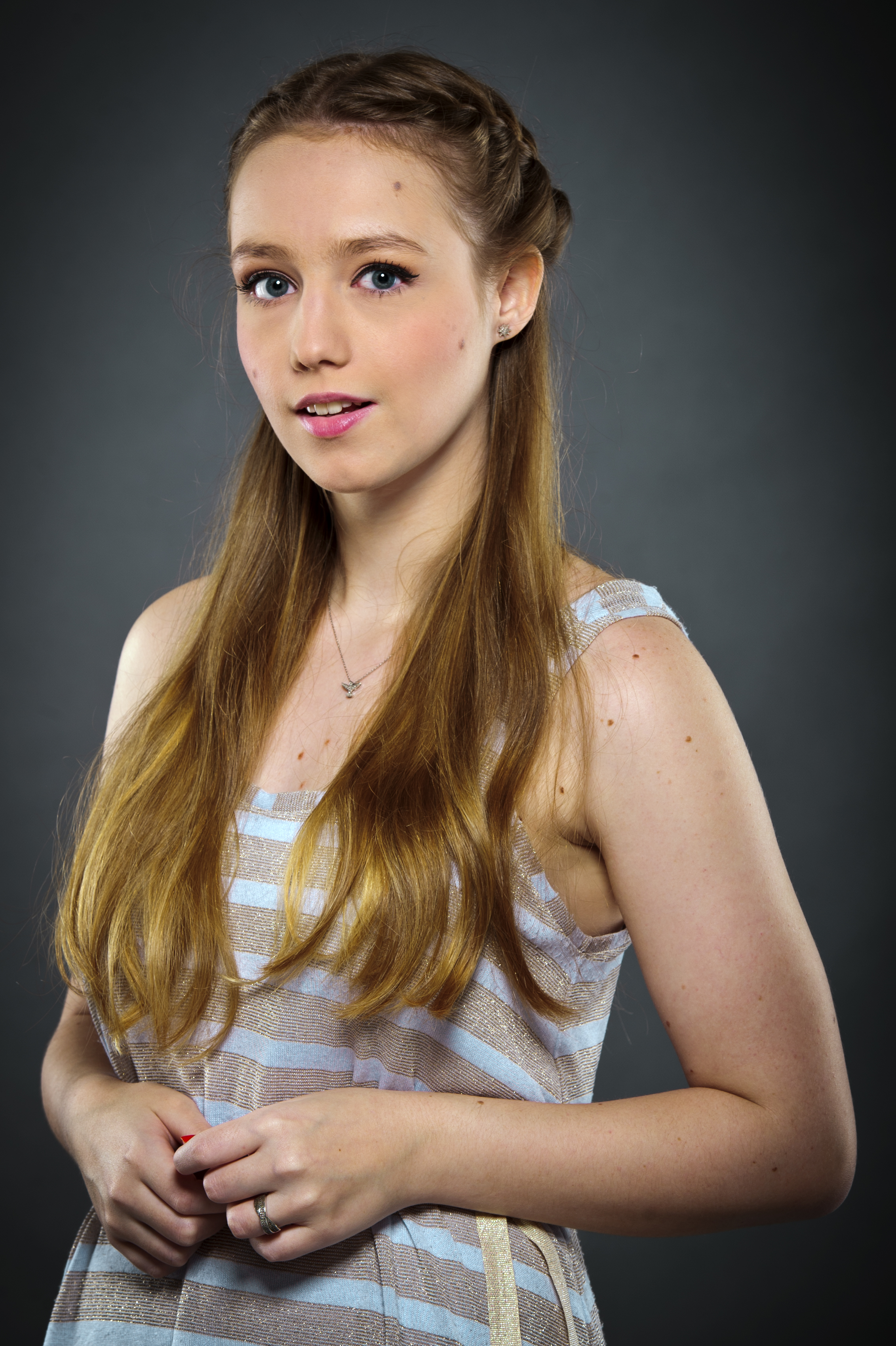
- Rodrigues in 2013
- Born: Maria Luísa Reisderfer Rodrigues; 29 August 1993 (age 32); Rio de Janeiro, Brazil
- Occupation: Actress
- Years active: 2004–present

Maria Luísa Reisderfer Rodrigues (born 29 August 1993), known professionally as Malu Rodrigues, is a Brazilian actress.

== Career ==
She began her preparation with courses at the agency TOPS, by Ieda Ribeiro, and at CAL, and with the directors Luiz Antônio Rocha, Sura Berditchevsky, Márcio Trigo and Augusto Thomas Vannucci. With singing classes since 2002, she had as preparers for singing the actresses and singers Telma Costa, Agnes Moço, Mirna Rubim and Ester Elias, besides the actor and singer Maurício Moço.

In the dance, she joined the Maria Olenewa Dance School from 2002 to 2005. Later she joined the casting of the children's modeling agency Ieda Ribeiro (Ieda Ribeiro Casting), as part of a group of young actors.

She has appeared in several critically acclaimed and award-winning musicals.

== Filmography ==
=== Television ===
Year	Title	Role
1996	Xuxa 10 anos	Herself
2004	Xuxa Especial de Natal - Papai Noel Sumiu?	Mariana
2004	O Pequeno Alquimista	Silvana
2006	JK	Young Lilian
2006	Xuxa 20 anos	Xuxa (11 years)
2007	Pé na Jaca	Young Maria Bô
2008	Três Irmãs	Marina
2011–15	Tapas & Beijos	Bia
2015	Acredita na Peruca	Suzy
2017	O Outro Lado do Paraíso	Karina
2022	Pantanal	Young Irma
2024	Benefits with Friends	Luiza Nunes

=== Film ===
Year	Title	Role
2004	Didi Quer Ser Criança	Sandrinha
2006	O Farol de Santo Agostinho	Júlia
2014	Confissões de Adolescente	Alice
2016	O Caseiro	Celina
2016	Minha Fama de Mau	Wanderléa

== Stage ==
Year	Play	Role
2007	Contos e Cantigas Populares	
2007	A Arca de Noé	
2008-09	A Noviça Rebelde	Louisa
2009-10	O Despertar da Primavera	Wendla
2009	Sete	Clara
2011	Um Violinista no Telhado	Hodel
2012	Beatles Num Céu de Diamantes	
2012	O Mágico de Oz	Dorothy
2014	Todos os Musicais de Chico Buarque em 90 Minutos	Margarida
2015	Beatles Num Céu de Diamantes	
2015	Nine: Um Musical Felliniano	Carla
2016	Cinco Júlias	Júlia 4
2017	Se meu apartamento falasse	Fran
2018	A Noviça Rebelde	Maria
