= Alanis Guillen =

Brazilian actress (born 1998)

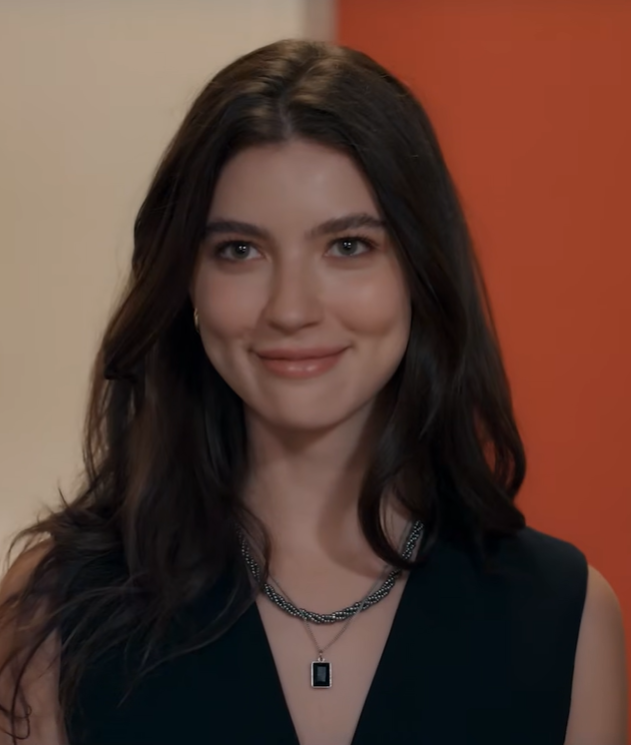
- Guillen in 2026
- Born: Alanis Guillen Caratella; 20 May 1998 (age 28); Santo André, São Paulo, Brazil
- Occupations: Actress; model
- Years active: 2018–present
- Notable work: Malhação; Pantanal; Três Graças

Alanis Guillen Caratella (Portuguese: [alɐˈnis ɡjˈleĩ kaɾaˈtɛlɐ]; born 20 May 1998) is a Brazilian actress and model. She became known for starring in Malhação (2019) and in Pantanal (2022), both soap operas from TV Globo.

== Biography ==
Alanis Guillen Caratella was born on 20 May 1998 to an architect mother and an engineer and musician father. She started her career participating in commercials as a child, having been hired by brands such as Nestlé, Marisa, Nextel and Mercado Livre. As a teenager, she took free courses in theater and dance, and later graduated in performing arts. She made her television debut at the age of 21, as the protagonist Rita in Malhação: Toda Forma de Amar, which aired from 2019 to 2020. In 2021, she was cast as Juma Marruá, in TV Globo's adaptation of the telenovela Pantanal. Her preparation for the role involved archetypal study, table study, changing habits, kung fu practice, riding lessons, prosody lessons, among other activities. In August 2025, she played the role of Maitê Rangel, a psychologist who maintains a relationship with a character portrayed by Alice Carvalho, in the romance and science fiction audio novel No Espaço Entre Nós from Audible Originals, created by Elayne Baeta and directed by Bianca Comparato. In October 2025, Guillen portrayed Flora Leite in the fantasy series Blood Red - Under the Moonlight and the rebellious Lorena Ferette in Aguinaldo Silva's telenovela Three Graces.

== Personal life ==
Guillen has described herself as a feminist and said that she does not like labels like heterosexual or bisexual, preferring to "connect with people". She is an environmental activist who has used Instagram to criticize the government of Jair Bolsonaro and fascism. She is also an amateur athlete, practicing Muay Thai routinely. On social media, Guillen has shared posts praising women and femininity. In November 2020, she wrote, "Long live women and the feminine energy that exists in everyone," in the caption of a video in which she imitated a snake.

Guillen has a fluid sexuality.

== Filmography ==
=== Television ===
Year	Title	Role	Notes	Ref.
2019–2020	Malhação: Toda Forma de Amar	Rita Gomes Moraes	TV Globo (Season 27)	
2022	Pantanal	Juma Marruá	TV Globo	
2024–2025	Crazy About You	Michele dos Santos Nogueira	TV Globo	
2025–2026	Blood Red - Under the Moonligh	Flora Leite	Globoplay	
2025–2026	Three Graces	Lorena Ferette	TV Globo	
2026	Loquinha	Lorena Ferette	Globoplay	
2026	Benefits with Friends	Giovana	Disney+ (Season 2)	
2027	Paraíso Perdido	Maria Cecília Werneck	Globoplay	

=== Film ===
Year	Title	Role	Notes
2018	Ser O Que Se É	Marta's friend	Short film
2023	Diário de Uma Onça	Narrator	Documentary
2025	Aparecida - O Filme	Donana	Short film

=== Audionovels ===
Year	Title	Role
2025	No Espaço Entre Nós	Maitê Rangel

== Awards and nominations ==
Award	Year	Category	Work	Results	Ref.
Prêmio Contigo! Online	2019	TV Revelation	Malhação: Toda Forma de Amar	Nominated	
Prêmio Contigo! Online	2019	Best Romantic Couple	Rita and Filipe (with Pedro Novaes)	Nominated	
MTV Millennial Awards	2022	Watched for You	Pantanal	Nominated	
Prêmio Jovem Brasileiro	2022	Best Actress	Pantanal	Nominated	
Prêmio Geração Glamour	2022	Revelation Actress	Pantanal	Won	
Prêmio Men of the Year Brasil	2022	Women of the Year	Pantanal	Won	
Capricho Awards	2022	National Artist of the Year (Cinema and TV)	Pantanal	Nominated	
Prêmio Notíciasdetv.com	2022	Best Revelation Actress	Pantanal	Won	
Melhores do Ano NaTelinha	2022	Best Actress	Pantanal	Nominated	
Acervo Awards	2022	Actress of the Year	Pantanal	Won	
Melhores do Ano	2022	Best Telenovela Actress	Pantanal	Nominated	
BreakTudo Awards	2022	National Actress	Pantanal	Nominated	
Prêmio Contigo! Online	2022	Best Telenovela Actress	Pantanal	Nominated	
Melhores do Ano AnaMaria	2022	Actress of the Year	Pantanal	Nominated	
Splash Awards	2022	Best Performance	Pantanal	Nominated	
Prêmio Área VIP	2022	Best Actress	Pantanal	Nominated	
Prêmio Área VIP	2022	Best Character (as Juma Marruá)	Pantanal	Nominated	
Poc Awards	2022	Actress (Popular Vote)	Pantanal	Won	
Troféu Internet	2023	Best Revelation	Pantanal	Pending	
IBest Award	2023	Protagonist Influencer	Pantanal	Nominated	
Prêmio Faz Diferença	2023	She	Pantanal	Nominated	
SEC Awards	2023	Featured on TV	Pantanal	Nominated	
Septimius Awards Festival	2023	Best American Actress	Pantanal	Nominated	
Prêmio F5	2025	Sexiest Person	Herself	Won	
Central Awards	2025	Best Supporting Actress	Vermelho Sangue	Pending	
Prêmio Safo	2025	Highlight Couple (with Laura Dutra)	Vermelho Sangue	Nominated	
Prêmio Safo	2025	Highlight Couple (with Letícia Vieira)	Vermelho Sangue	Nominated	
Prêmio Safo	2025	Highlight Couple (with Alice Carvalho)	No Espaço Entre Nós	Nominated	
Prêmio Safo	2025	Highlight Couple (with Gabriela Medvedovsky)	Três Graças	Nominated	
Prêmio Safo	2025	Highlight Artist	Três Graças	Won	
Melhores do Ano do FF.Info	2025	Sapphic Couple in Fiction (with Gabriela Medvedovski)	Três Graças	Won	
Melhores do Ano de Mais Novela	2025	Best Couple (with Gabriela Medvedovski)	Três Graças	Pending	
