= João Guilherme =

João Guilherme may refer to:

- Choco (footballer, born 4 January 1990), João Guilherme Estevão da Silva, Brazilian former football forward
- João Guilherme (footballer, born 1986), João Guilherme Leme Amorim, Brazilian football defender
- João Guilherme (footballer, born 1994), João Guilherme Barcelos Neto Nogueira, Brazilian football forward
- João Guilherme Ripper (born 1959), Brazilian composer
- João Guilherme Fischer (1876–1952), Brazilian diplomat
- João Sousa (footballer, born 1994), João Guilherme Gonçalves de Sousa, Portuguese football defender
