= National (brand) =

Japanese appliances brand

- Native name: ナショナル
- Industry: Electronics; Home appliances
- Founded: Osaka, Japan (1925)
- Founder: Kōnosuke Matsushita
- Defunct: 1980 (Europe); 1988 (Australia/New Zealand); 2004 (Asia); October 1, 2008 (Japan)
- Successor: Panasonic
- Headquarters: Kadoma, Osaka, Japan
- Area served: Worldwide
- Products: home, personal and industrial appliances, bicycles
- Parent: Panasonic Corporation

National (ナショナル, Nashonaru) was a brand used by Panasonic Corporation (formerly Matsushita Electric Industrial Co., Ltd.) to sell home appliances, personal appliances, and industrial appliances.

Several similarly-named companies exist, such as National Cash Register, National Semiconductor, National Car Rental, National Australia Bank, National Book Store and National Grid Corporation of the Philippines, but none of them are related to the National brand.

== History ==
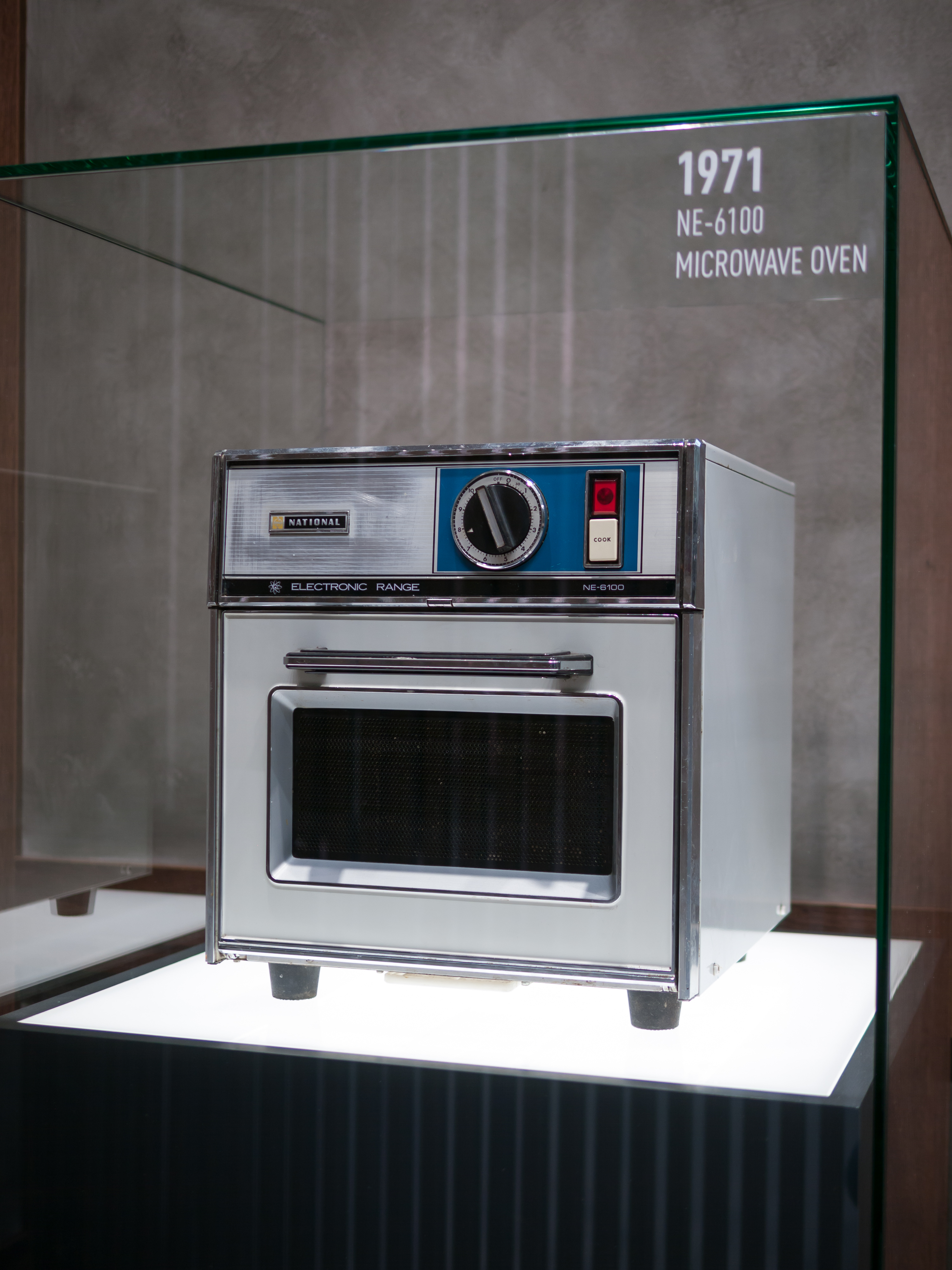
National NE-6100 microwave oven

National RJX-601 radio transceiver

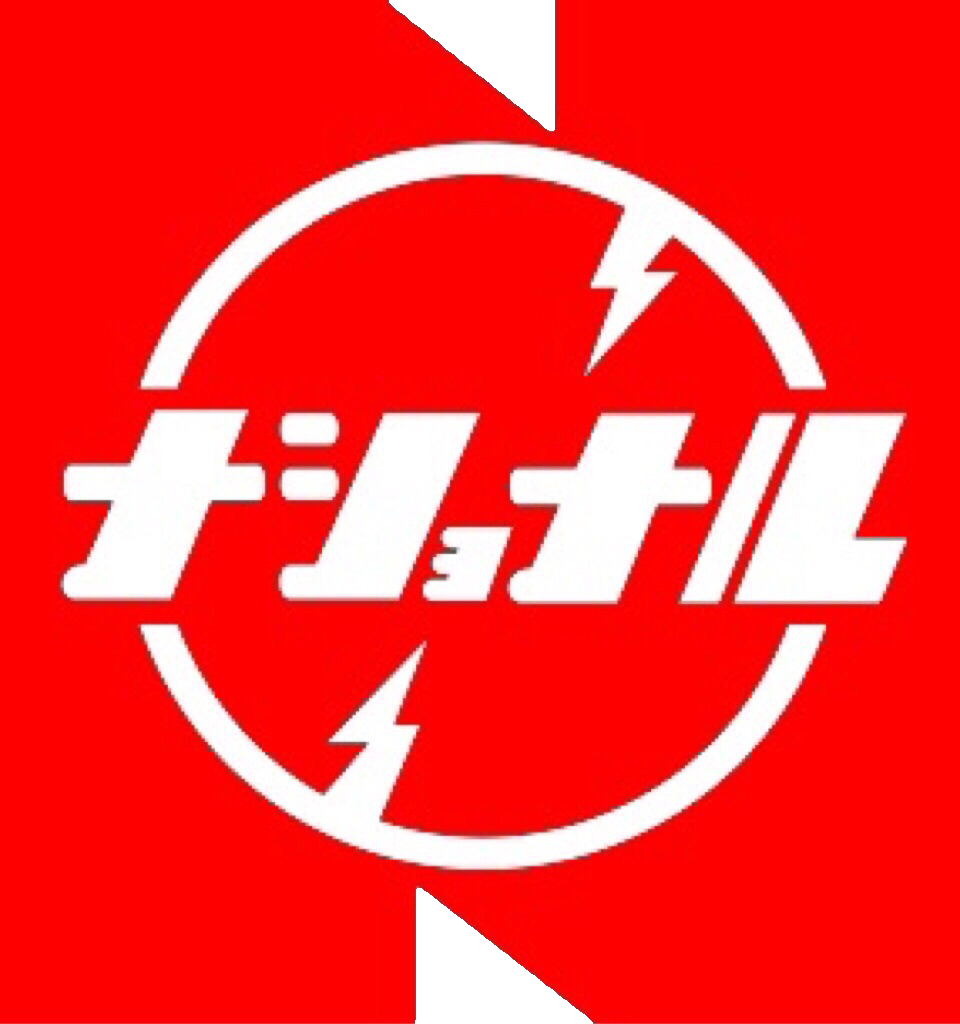
The National "N-Mark" discontinued in Japan in 1987; outside Japan, "ナショナル" is replaced with "National" typeset in Helvetica

Before present-day Panasonic produced appliances under the name, the National brand was first used by Konosuke Matsushita's electric firm to sell his battery-powered bicycle lamps, hoping that they would be a product used by all of Japan, hence the name "National". It was arguably the first well-known brand of Japanese electronics.

National was formerly the premier brand on most Matsushita products, including audio and video and was combined in 1988 as National Panasonic after the worldwide success of the Panasonic name.

After 1980 in Europe, and 1988 in Australia and New Zealand, Matsushita ceased the usage of the "National" brand, and sold audiovisual products exclusively under the Panasonic and Technics brands. Matsushita never officially used the National name in the United States, due to the trademark being already in use by National Cash Register. The brand made a brief appearance in 2003 on rice cookers, meat grinders and a handful of small kitchen appliances. In addition, National rice cookers were imported for sale in many Asian-American markets.

National was well known throughout Asia as a reputable manufacturer of domestic appliances such as rice cookers. In 2004, the "National" brand was gradually phased out in Asia, the penultimate market it was used in, with most products being rebranded under the Panasonic brand after the company decided to unify all their businesses under the Panasonic brand for greater recognition.

Several models of National-branded kerosene-based heaters were recalled due to a failure in the exhaust hose which would allow carbon monoxide to leak into the room. The recall effort began in November of 2005 after a fatal accident in January of the same year.

Due to its historical significance and recognition in Matsushita's native Japan, non-audiovisual Matsushita products (mostly home appliances or white goods) were branded "National" until October 1, 2008. As of October 1, 2008, Matsushita changed its company name to Panasonic Corporation. Non-audiovisual products that were branded "National" in Japan are currently marketed under the "Panasonic" brand.

== Bicycle Manufacturing ==
National bicycles were imported into the United States under the Panasonic label. The brand was known for producing high quality cycles at a relatively low price, as the result of a very high degree of factory automation and a resultingly low labor force with attendant savings in salaries and benefits. One of their models featured the unusual Shimano front freewheel system.

== Advertising campaigns ==
National-Panasonic logo
- In 1960, National launched a tokusatsu series, co-produced by Toei, called National Kid, in a clear merchandising effort. The series wasn't popular in its home market, but attained cult status in Brazil.
- In 1976, the Swedish band ABBA shot some ads promoting National. They were broadcast in Western Europe (Belgium, France, Netherlands, Switzerland, and West Germany), Australia, New Zealand, Japan, Philippines and Thailand.
- In 1978, J-pop duo Pink Lady appeared in several commercials promoting National's air conditioner and Pepper portable transistor radio.
- Peter Allen served as the high-energy national spokesperson and star for National Panasonic Australia from 1980 to 1988. He fronted major TV advertising campaigns, promoting consumer electronics like VCRs, Colour TVs, and camcorders under the famous tag "National: The Big Entertainer"
- In the 1980s a promotion was made in Japan for National TV, using the cat "Chatran" also known as "Milo" from Fuji TV's 1986 theatrical feature film The Adventures of Milo and Otis (Koneko Monogatari). The commercial features some segments of the movie, then shows "Chatran"/"Milo" with a human companion.
