= João Guilherme Ripper =

Brazilian composer, conductor, cultural manager

João Guilherme Ripper (born 1959 in Rio de Janeiro) is a Brazilian composer and conductor.

João Guilherme Ripper is a composer, conductor, cultural manager and professor at the School of Music of the Federal University of Rio de Janeiro. He studied with Henrique Morelenbaum and Ronaldo Miranda. In 1997, Ripper obtained his D.M.A. in Composition at The Catholic University of America, in Washington D.C., under the guidance of German composer Helmut Braunlich and Argentine musicologist Emma Garmendia. He pursued further studies in Orchestral Conducting with Maestro Guillermo Scarabino in Argentina, and attended the class of "Économie et Financement de la Culture" at the Université Paris-Dauphine, in France. Ripper served as Director of the School of Music of the Federal University of Rio de Janeiro between 1999 and 2003. In 2004, he accepted the invitation of the Government of the State of Rio de Janeiro to direct Sala Cecília Meireles, a leading chamber music hall, where he remained for 11 years and undertook a comprehensive renovation. In 2015, he was appointed President of the Municipal Theater Foundation of Rio de Janeiro, the city’s opera house, a position he held until 2017. Ripper is the current President of the Brazilian Academy of Music, an institution founded by Heitor Villa-Lobos in 1945 that brings together 40 Brazilian composers, interpreters and musicologists.

Ripper frequently collaborates with orchestras, chamber ensembles, theaters and festivals in Brazil and abroad creating new works and acting as a resident composer. Recent commissioned compositions include the three series "From My Window", written for the Kean University (USA), "Desenredo" and "Five Poems By Vinicius de Moraes" written for São Paulo State Orchestra (OSESP), "Symphonic Games” written for the Minas Gerais Philharmonic, "Nativity - Scenic Cantata” written for the Teatro Amazonas, "Gloria Concertato", written for the International Congress of Sacred Music of the Federal University of Rio de Janeiro, and “Psalmus”, featured in May 2018 at the Latin American Music Festival in Caracas, Venezuela.

With eight titles, the opera plays a central role in his catalog of works. Recent productions include "Onheama" for young audiences, presented at the Terras Sem Sombra Festival in Portugal in 2016; the chamber opera “Domitila”, produced this year in Brazil and Portugal and “Piedade”, programmed in the 2017 and 2018 seasons of the Teatro Colón’s Chamber Opera series, in Argentina.“Piedade” was also featured at the São Paulo Municipal Theater and at Sala Cecília Meireles in Rio de Janeiro. The comic opera "Il Dilettante" premiered in 2014, and had a new production in Espírito Santo last year and in São Paulo this year. The opera "Kawah Ijen" commissioned by the Teatro Amazonas was premiered in May 2018 at the 21st Amazon Opera Festival. The opera's plot is set in Indonesia and Kawah Ijen is the first opera to incorporate the Javanese Gamelan into the orchestration, thanks to the collaboration of the Indonesian Embassy in Brazil. In 2020, the chamber opera “Cartas Portuguesas” (Portuguese Letters), based on a 17th-Century book, was premiered at Sala São Paulo and Fundação Gulbenkian in Lisbon. The work was commissioned as part of the partnership established between Gulbenkian Música and the São Paulo State Symphony Orchestra. In 2022, the Centro Cultural de Belem in Lisbon produced his Domitila.

== Operas ==
2020: Cartas Portuguesas (Portuguese Letters)

2018: Kawa Ijen

2014: O Diletante (The Dilettante)

2013-2014: Onheama

2012: Anjo Negro (Black Angel)

2003: Anjo Negro (Black Angel)

2000: Domitila
