= Pantanal (2022 TV series) =

- Genre: Telenovela; Western; Magic realism
- Created by: Benedito Ruy Barbosa
- Based on: Pantanal by Benedito Ruy Barbosa
- Written by: Bruno Luperi
- Directed by: Davi Lacerda; Noa Bressane; Roberta Richard; Walter Carvalho; Cristiano Marques; Rogério Gomes; Gustavo Fernandez
- Starring: Marcos Palmeira; Dira Paes; Jesuíta Barbosa; Irandhir Santos; Alanis Guillen
- Theme music composer: Marcus Viana
- Opening theme: "Pantanal" by Maria Bethânia & Almir Sater
- Composers: Rodolpho Rebuzzi; Rafael Luperi
- Country of origin: Brazil
- Original language: Portuguese
- No. of seasons: 1
- No. of episodes: 167

Production
- Executive producer: Lucas Zardo
- Producers: Luciana Monteiro; Andrea Kelly
- Cinematography: Sergio Tortori; Henrique Sales
- Editors: Carlos Eduardo Kerr; Marcos Pereira Lisboa; Jeferson Cysneiros
- Camera setup: Single camera
- Running time: 30–85 minutes
- Production company: Estúdios Globo

Original release
- Network: TV Globo
- Release: 28 March – 7 October 2022

Pantanal is a Brazilian telenovela produced and broadcast by TV Globo. It premiered on 28 March 2022, and ended on 7 October 2022.

The telenovela is written by Bruno Luperi and is based on the 1990 telenovela of the same name, created by Benedito Ruy Barbosa. It stars Marcos Palmeira, Dira Paes, Jesuíta Barbosa, Irandhir Santos, and Alanis Guillen.

The telenovela storyline addresses contemporary life at the world's largest tropical wetland area, the Pantanal, and the cattle-ranching activity in the region. Filmed in location shortly after the worst forest fire in the Pantanal history, the show also tackles the climate change and the fight against deforestation between locals and natives.

In 2023, the show was nominated for the International Emmy Award for Best Telenovela.

== Plot ==
Joventino, one of the greatest farmers in the Pantanal, disappears without a trace and abandons his son, José Leôncio. Five years later, on a trip to Rio de Janeiro, José Leôncio falls in love and marries Madeleine. The two move to the Pantanal, where their son, Jove, is born. Madeleine misses her life in the city and does not accept the fate of loneliness that comes with being a farmer's wife. With her husband always on the road, she is forced to live with Filó, a maid whom she knows little and does not trust. Madeleine doesn't understand José Leôncio's relationship with Filó and Tadeu, Filó's son and godson of José Leôncio. What Madeleine does not know is that Filó was a prostitute with whom José Leôncio had a relationship on one of his trips in the past.

Madeleine flees the Pantanal taking Jove, still a baby, to her family's mansion. Jove grows up out of sight of his father, who found himself unable to fight for custody of his son. José Leôncio has never failed to meet his legal obligations, sending monthly alimony. Jove grows up believing that his father is dead, while José Leôncio finds an heir in Tadeu. Some years after Madeleine's departure, Filó confesses that Tadeu is also José Leôncio's son. Despite their joy at the revelation, the three of them keep the information a secret. Thus, Tadeu remains only as the godson of his boss, which hurts him deeply.

Twenty years later, Jove discovers that his father is alive and goes in search of him, in a reunion marked by a big party. Although happy with the moment, José Leôncio and Jove face an abyss of behavioral and cultural differences, while Jove deals with Tadeu's jealousy. To complete the family turmoil, at one point, everyone is surprised by the arrival of a third son who vies for the love and admiration of this father: José Lucas de Nada. José Lucas arrives at the farm by the hand of fate and discovers the family ties he never had. In the midst of the events, Jove and Juma Marruá fall in love. The daughter of Maria Marruá and Gil, Juma does not open her guard to anyone and has learned from her mother to defend herself from the "animal men", the most dangerous species that can prowl the abandoned village where she lives. The "animal men" took her whole family. Thus, she became a wild and distant woman. Despite their differences, Jove and Juma live an intense passion.

== Cast ==
=== Main ===
- Marcos Palmeira as José Leôncio
  - Renato Góes as Young José Leôncio
  - Drico Alves as Teen José Leôncio
  - Fred Garcia as Child José Leôncio
- Dira Paes as Filomena "Filó" Aparecida
  - Leticia Salles as Young Filó
- Jesuíta Barbosa as Joventino "Jove" Leôncio Neto
  - Guilherme Tavares as Child Jove
- Irandhir Santos as José Lucas de Nada
- Alanis Guillen as Juma Marruá
  - Valentina Oliveira as Child Juma
- Murilo Benício as Tenório
- Osmar Prado as Velho do Rio
  - Irandhir Santos as Velho do Rio (first phase)
- Selma Egrei as Mariana Braga Novaes
- Camila Morgado as Irma Braga Novaes
  - Malu Rodrigues as Young Irma
- Juliano Cazarré as Alcides
- Julia Dalavia as Maria "Guta" Augusta
- José Loreto as Tadeu Aparecido Leôncio
  - Lucas Oliveira dos Santos as Child Tadeu
- Fábio Neppo as Sebastião "Tião"
- Chico Teixeira as Quim
- Caco Ciocler as Gustavo
  - Gabriel Stauffer as Young Gustavo
- Isabel Teixeira as Maria Nogueira "Maria Bruaca"
- Silvero Pereira as Zaqueu
- Karine Teles as Madeleine Braga Novaes
  - Bruna Linzmeyer as Young Madeleine
- Gabriel Sater as Trindade
- César Ferrario
- Aline Borges as Zuleica Gonçalves
- Leandro Lima as Levi
- Gabriel Santana as Renato "Reno" Gonçalves Nogueira
- Cauê Campos as Roberto "Beto" Gonçalves Nogueira
- Lucci Ferreira
- Mareliz Rodrigues
- Paula Barbosa as Zefa
- Lucas Leto as Marcelo Gonçalves Nogueira
- Guito as Tibério
- Bella Campos as Maria Rute "Muda"
- Túlio Starling as Francisco "Chico" Marruá
- Victoria Rossetti as Nayara
- Almir Sater as Eugênio Chalaneiro

=== Guest stars ===
- Juliana Paes as Maria Marruá
- Enrique Díaz as Gil
- Leopoldo Pacheco as Antero Novaes
- Paulo Gorgulho as Ceci
- Giovana Cordeiro as Generosa
- Orã Figueiredo as Reginaldo
- Jackson Antunes
- Erom Cordeiro as Lúcio
- Cláudio Galvan as Ari
- Romeu Benedicto as Anacleto

== Production ==
On 6 September 2020, TV Globo announced that it would be producing a new version of Pantanal. Bruno Luperi, grandson of Benedito Ruy Barbosa, was announced as writer of the new version. Filming began in August 2021. Filming of the first part of the series ended in December 2021.

=== Casting ===
The first cast members of the series were announced in July 2021. On 19 September 2021, Alanis Guillen was confirmed in the leading role.

== Ratings ==
Season	Episodes	First aired		Last aired		Avg. viewers (points)
Season	Episodes	Date	Viewers (points)	Date	Viewers (points)	Avg. viewers (points)
1	167	28 March 2022	28.3	7 October 2022	34.0	30
