= Rafael Baronesi =

Brazilian actor, singer, and television presenter (born 1981)

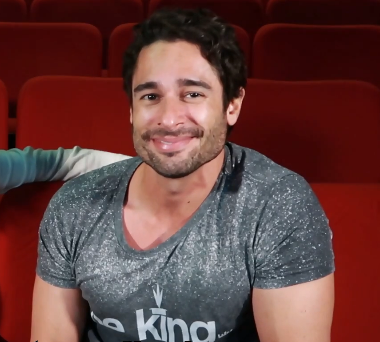
- Born: February 19, 1981 (age 45); Rio de Janeiro, Brazil
- Occupations: actor singer and host
- Notable work: Zapping Zone (2004–2009)

Rafael Baronesi (born Rio de Janeiro, February 19, 1981) is an actor, singer and television presenter from Brazil. He hosted the Disney Channel program Zapping Zone from 2004 until his departure on September 25, 2009.

== Biography ==
Rafael began studying theater when he was 14. He performed as an amateur from the age of 4 years and at 17 years had his professional debut.

He became famous when he entered the program Zapping Zone with Fabiola Ribeiro in 2004. In the program, besides being himself, "Rafa", as he is known, interpreted the critical character of the game of ZZ. He presented the program with Thays Gorga, Daniel Bianchin and Yasmim Manaia. In 2011 he was hired by Shoptime. In 2018, he was hired by Rede Bandeirantes.

== Works ==
Programs and soap operas

- Disney Channel Games, Team Inferno – Disney (2008)

Soap

- Family Ties – Figurante Globo (2001)
- Kubanacan – Globo (2003)
- Malhação – Globo
- Cama de Gato – Host of a TalkShow – Globo
- Vai na Fé – Dr. Jorge (2023)
- Vale Tudo – Rodolfo (2025)

Miniseries

- Only One Heart – Globo (2004)

Theater

- Marriage Party
- The Athenaeum
- Youth Conturbada
- Nerium Park

Television Show

- Zapping Zone – Disney Channel (2004–2009)

Special on Disney Channel

- The Chronicles of Narnia
- Ratatouille
- Cars
- Pirates of the Caribbean
- The Witch Mountain

Clip

- Flirting with me (Raddi Paparazzi – Rafael Baroneso)

Music

- Let's go! (Disney Channel Games)
