= Tapas & Beijos =

- Genre: Comedy
- Created by: Cláudio Paiva
- Starring: Andréa Beltrão; Fernanda Torres; Fábio Assunção; Vladimir Brichta; Otávio Müller; Fernanda de Freitas; Érico Brás; Kiko Mascarenhas; Malu Rodrigues; Orã Figueiredo; Flávio Migliaccio; Natália Lage; Rafael Primot; Analu Prestes; Evandro Mesquita
- Country of origin: Brazil
- Original language: Portuguese
- No. of seasons: 5
- No. of episodes: 169

Production
- Running time: 40 minutes

Original release
- Network: Rede Globo
- Release: 5 April 2011 – 15 September 2015

Tapas & Beijos (English: Slaps & Kisses) is a Brazilian comedy television series that aired on Rede Globo from 5 April 2011 to 15 September 2015. It was created by Cláudio Paiva, directed by Maurício Farias and starring Andréa Beltrão and Fernanda Torres as Sueli and Fátima, respectively.

== Plot ==
Tapas & Beijos is a series about friendship and the unexpected elements of love in the lives of inseparable friends Sueli (Andréa Beltrão) and Fátima (Fernanda Torres). Clad in their identical uniforms, they work at Djalma Brides in Copacabana, Rio de Janeiro, helping brides-to-be fulfill their dreams with the perfect wedding dress. In the process, the girls hope to find their own prince charming, which proves to be no easy task.

Sueli was married for two months to fun-loving Jurandir, a slacker who avoids work at all cost. He never fails to torment her life, especially since he is a waiter at the restaurant next door to Djalma Brides. Although she is still attracted to him, she becomes smitten by Jorge, a handsome newcomer who arrives to cause a stir in her bachelorette life. Outspoken Fátima has to deal with the quirky situations of dating Armane, a seductive married man who swears that someday they will have a relationship that goes beyond working hours. He owns a gift shop nearby and they are either constantly swearing love to one another or at each other's throat. Djalma and Flavia make up the lovey-dovey married couple who own the wedding dress store. Flavia, who is also an employee at the store, does not cut the girls any slack and loves to boss them around.

The girls love to hang out and eat at Chalita's restaurant, the place next door. Chalita is an offbeat widower who has a crush on Sueli and is in pursuit of a wife to make him happy. Sueli can count on Saint Anthony, who comes to life and gives her bold advice on love or listens to her repeated complaints about the men in her life. But eventually, in the second season, all of the girls' romantic efforts pay off when Sueli marries Jorge and Fátima marries Armane in one outlandish ceremony. But that does not mean the girls will have it any easier, they must now adapt to the rollercoaster of married life. Despite all their romantic setbacks, Fátima and Sueli never lose their sense of humor in a hilarious attempt to handle their love lives.

== Cast and characters ==
=== Main ===
- Andréa Beltrão as Sueli Cardoso
- Fernanda Torres as Fátima de Souza
- Fábio Assunção as Jorgeney "Jorge" Almeida
- Vladimir Brichta as Armane Barbosa
- Otávio Müller as Djalma Mattos
- Fernanda de Freitas as Flávia Mattos (Flavinha)
- Érico Brás as Jurandir dos Santos
- Kiko Mascarenhas as Tavares/Santo Antônio
- Daniel Boaventura as Paulo César Mendes Pereira (PC) (seasons 1, 3-5)
- Malu Rodrigues as Maria Beatriz Almeida (Bia)
- Orã Figueiredo as Tijolo
- Flávio Migliaccio as Chalita Said
- Natália Lage as Lucilene (seasons 2–5)
- Rafael Primot as Stephanie (seasons 3–5)
- Analu Prestes as Shirley Said (seasons 4–5)
- Evandro Mesquita as Mustafá Said Al-Masi (season 5)

== Awards and nominations ==
Year	Award	Category	Nominated work	Result
2011	Prêmio Extra	Best Series	Tapas & Beijos	Won
2011	Prêmio Extra	Best Actress	Andrea Beltrão	Won
2011	Prêmio Extra	Best Theme Music	"Entre Tapas e Beijos"	Won
2011	Troféu APCA	Best Series	Tapas & Beijos	Won
2012	Prêmio Contigo! de TV	Best TV Series	Tapas & Beijos	Won
2012	Prêmio Contigo! de TV	Best Actress in a Series/Miniseries	Fernanda Torres	Won
2012	Prêmio Contigo! de TV	Best Actor in a Series/Miniseries	Vladimir Brichta	Won
