= National Kid =

- Title card for National Kid.
- Genre: Tokusatsu; Science fiction Superhero
- Created by: Minoru Kisegawa (eps. 1–30); Ichirō Miyagawa (eps. 23–30); Unno Juza (eps. 31–39)
- Written by: Takashi Tanii; Nagayoshi Akasaka
- Directed by: Nagayoshi Akasaka; Jun Koike; Naruo Watanabe
- Starring: Ichirō Kojima (eps. 1–22); Hidetarō Tatsumi (eps. 23–39)
- Theme music composer: Tasaku Sano
- Opening theme: "Song of National Kid" (ナショナル・キッドの歌, Nashonaru Kiddo no Uta), written by Masayoshi Onuki, sung by Victor Children's Chorus
- Composer: Yasuo Fukazawa
- Country of origin: Japan
- Original language: Japanese
- No. of episodes: 39

Production
- Producers: Masamichi Sato; Kazuma Nosaka; Yoshi Nakai
- Running time: 30 minutes

Original release
- Network: NET
- Release: August 4, 1960 – April 27, 1961

National Kid (Japanese: ナショナルキッド, Hepburn: Nashonaru Kiddo) is a Japanese TV series produced by Toei Company in 1960. Broadcast on NET, it was sponsored by Panasonic, then known as Matsushita Electric, to promote the National brand. Although not very famous in Japan, the series has obtained cult status in Brazil, where it was very popular.

== Plot ==
National Kid is a messenger from the Andromeda Galaxy thirty thousand light-years away, who is immortal and protects the Earth from invaders. His alter ego on Earth is Ryusaku Hata (旗竜作, Hata Ryusaku)—or Massao Hata in the Brazilian dub—the son and apprentice of the world-renowned scientist, Dr. Masachika Hata, who holds his practice in a suburb of Tokyo. His powers include superhuman strength and flight. National Kid also carries the "Eroruya Ray Gun" (エロルヤ光線銃, Eroruya kōsen jū) which was similar to the flashlight sold by Matsushita. Hata raises five orphan children, which try to help investigating the strange phenomena in the series. When in danger, the kids call National Kid to rescue them via the "Magic Radio" (マジックラジオ, Majikku Rajio), a National radio transmitter.

== Story arcs ==
The National Kid series comprises four story arcs through 39 episodes.

=== Attack of the Incas (インカ族の来襲, Inka-zoku no Raishū) ===
The first arc lasted 13 episodes. The story has National Kid defending the Earth from the Incas, an alien race who arrive from the planet Venus.

Inca Venusians (インカ金星人, Inka Kinseijin)

Concerned that the effects of nuclear tests on Earth could spread through space, the Incas invade and unleash massive UFO attacks on Japan. They worship a God called "Abika," with altars also furnished in their ship. They also release a virus in which National Kid struggles to find a cure. The hero flies into the mountains and uses his Eroruya Ray Gun to blow apart some boulders in order to uncover some rare minerals that helped in creating a remedy for the virus' effects. The remainder of the episodes primarily had National Kid saving children and himself from Inca attacks.

- Aura (アウラ) (Inca Venusian captain) - played by Yoshiko Nogawa

Vemana and Kabia's boss. Act's cruelly, but speaks in very polite words.

- Vemana (ヴィマナ, Vimana) (Inca Venusian executive) - played by Akira Katayama
- Kabia (カビア) (Inca Venusian executive) - played by Ichi Kubo

=== Undersea Devil Nelkon (海底魔王ネルコン, Kaitei Maō Nerukon) ===
The second story arc ran 9 episodes. Already using new techniques including blue screen, the special effects are significantly improved over the first story's efforts. This time National Kid battles an army of oceanic creatures called the Undersea People Coelacanth (海底人シーラカンス, Kaiteijin Shīrakansu).

Undersea People Coelacanth (海底人シーラカンス, Kaiteijin Shīrakansu)

The Undersea People- ancient coelacanth fish that had evolved into human beings- declare war on the surface world. The Undersea People are uniformed in long black robes with triangular hoods. They have faces like a Komodo dragon, and their bodies are similar to the Creature from the Creature from the Black Lagoon movies. The Undersea People come to the surface world riding in an anglerfish-shaped submarine named Guilton, which was built in their undersea city 10,000 m below depth, causing seismic waves destroying naval ships.

- Fish No.1 (フィッシュ1号, Fisshu Ichi-go) - played by Akira Katayama
- Fish No.3 (フィッシュ3号, Fisshu San-go) - played by Nobuyuki Ezawa
- Dr. Kawamura (川村博士, Kawamura-Hakase) - played by Haruni Kubo

=== Underground Demon Castle (地底魔城, Chitei Majō) ===
The third story arc ran 8 episodes. Ichirō Kojima leaves the series, and Hidetarō Tatsumi takes over the role of National Kid until the series' end. In this arc, National Kid takes on armed forces from beneath the Earth's surface. The Underground People are looking for the formula to a rare element that will give them supreme power. Once again UFOs attack Japan killing civilians.

Underground People (地底人, Chiteijin)

- President Helnstein (ヘルンシュタイン総統, Herunshutain) (Underground People) - played by Koji Matsuyama

=== Mystery of the Space Boy (謎の宇宙少年, Nazo no Uchū Shōnen) ===
The last story arc ran 9 episodes. A space boy named Taro accidentally falls to Earth. Then Taro's father mistakenly threatens the destruction of Tokyo and unleashes the giant monster Gyabura for his boy's blunder. Taro befriends Hata's students, and tells his father Earth is a peaceful planet. After this final threat, Ryusaku Hata reveals he is the Earth's hero National Kid and returns to Andromeda.

== Main cast ==
The cast members of National Kid were:

- Ichirō Kojima: Ryusaku Hata/ National Kid (episodes 1-22)
- Hidetarō Tatsumi: Ryusaku Hata/ National Kid (episodes 23-39)
- Taeko Shimura: Hisako (Chako) Obata
- Shiko Saito: Dr. Mizuno
- Isamu Yamaguchi: Dr. Yamada
- Chiyoko Honma: Tsuneko Yamada
- Taku Fukushima, Hideyo Kimura, Toru Shimizu, Kazuo Hara, Midori Okada: The Child Detectives (少年探偵団, Shonen tantei-dan), Yukio, Tomohiro, Kurazo, Goro, and Kyoko

For the Brazilian version, voices were dubbed in Portuguese by:

- Emerson Camargo: National Kid
- Cristina Camargo: Thiako
- Maria Inês: Goro
- Magaly Sanches: Kurazo
- Rafael Marques: Tomohiro
- Sônia Regina: Yukio
- Osmano Cardoso: Dr. Mizuno

== Development ==
To compete against KRTV's Moonlight Mask (1958), NET (now TV Asahi) commissioned the production of their own tokusatsu series from Toei Company. Sponsored by Matsushita Electric in order to promote their National brand electronics, it was considered a "relatively expensive series" by The Dorama Encyclopedia's authors. Through National's high investments, it was possible to create the first flying superhero in Japanese TV history.

National Kid was Toei's fourth tokusatsu series. Nagayoshi Akasaka, director of the series, was inspired by Adventures of Superman when creating National Kid.

The series was shot in black-and-white. National Kid's production cost was high for the time's standards: each 30-minute episode had a production budget of 1.5 million yen, when the average money invested in a TV series in Japan that time was of 10 thousand yen per minute (300 thousand yen for a 30-minute episode).

== Release and reception ==
National Kid debuted on NET on August 4, 1960, concluding its first season on October 27, 1960. The second season aired between November 3, 1960, and December 29, 1960, while the third and fourth seasons aired from January 5, 1961, to February 23, 1961 and from March 2, 1961, to April 27, 1961 respectively. Toei described it as a "big hit" and as having "strong popularity" even in 2015, and released a digital remastered version of the show on May 13, 2015.

A manga adaptation of the TV series by Daiji Kazumine appeared as a serial in Kodansha's Bokura magazine between its July 1960 and December 1961 issues. The work comicalized the first three seasons of National Kid until its June 1961 issue, when it started to create original plots. The series' popularity contributed to the increase in the number of Bokura copies in circulation. Kodansha also released the manga in three tankōbon (book) volumes, but only included the first two seasons. All Bokura stories were later released by Manga Shop in a kanzenban edition (collector's edition) on December 2, 2008.

National Kid gained a cult status in Brazil. It first aired in Brazil in 1964, by TV Record, later reaired on TV Globo in 1968. It was very popular in Brazil. The series was redubbed and achieved new popularity in Brazil in the 1990s. It was released in VHS in 1993 and in DVD in 2009.

A series of graffiti with the phrase "Celacanto provoca maremoto" ("The coelacanth causes seaquake"), referencing the villains' submarine, appeared in several spots of Rio de Janeiro as meme, starting from 1977 in Zona Sul and throughout the city in the early 1980s. The sentence was replicated by artist Adriana Varejão on the upper floor of the Olympic Aquatics Stadium, a facility of the 2016 Summer Olympics.

In 2009, the National Kid character was portrayed in a Rio de Janeiro Carnival parade by the samba school Unidos da Tijuca; the costume used on the parade was one of the best-selling costumes for the school. In 2018, the Olinda carnival will feature the superhero as a mediator for Donald Trump and Kim Jong Un trying to solve the 2017–18 North Korea crisis.
