= Pedro Alves (Brazilian actor) =

Brazilian actor (born 1993)

- Born: 26 March 1993 (age 33); Rio de Janeiro, Brazil
- Education: L'École du Jeu
- Occupation: Actor
- Years active: 2019–present
- Known for: Malhação: Toda Forma de Amar, Vermelho Sangue, Dona de Mim, Quem Ama Cuida

Pedro Alves (born 26 March 1993) is a Brazilian actor. He is best known for portraying Guga in Malhação: Toda Forma de Amar (2019), Michel in the Globoplay series Vermelho Sangue (2025), Caco in the telenovela Dona de Mim (2025), and Fernando in Quem Ama Cuida (2026).

== Career ==
Born in Rio de Janeiro, Alves spent part of his childhood and adolescence in Belgium, where he began studying acting at the age of 12. He later trained at L'École du Jeu in Paris. Before pursuing acting full time, he worked as a cleaner, receptionist and nanny.

He made his television debut in 2019 playing Guga in the TV Globo teen soap Malhação: Toda Forma de Amar.

In 2025, Alves joined the cast of the TV Globo telenovela Dona de Mim as Caco and starred as the vampire Michel in the Globoplay original fantasy series Vermelho Sangue.

In 2026, he joined the cast of the telenovela Quem Ama Cuida, portraying Fernando, a medical student who moves to the city to live with his grandmother while balancing his studies and work.

== Filmography ==
Year	Title	Role	Notes	Network / Platform
2019	Malhação: Toda Forma de Amar	Guga	Main cast	TV Globo
2025	Dona de Mim	Caco	Supporting role	TV Globo
2025	Vermelho Sangue	Michel	Lead role	Globoplay
2026	Quem Ama Cuida	Fernando	Supporting role	TV Globo
