= IBest Award =

Award of the Brazilian Internet

iBest Award
- Prêmio iBest
- Awarded for: The Award of the Brazilian Internet
- Country: Brazil
- Presented by: iBest Global
- Hosted by: Marcos Wettreich
- First award: 1995-2008 (12–13 years)
- Final award: 2020 (0 years)
- Website: https://www.premioibest.com

The iBest Award (Prêmio iBest, in Portuguese), formerly called Internet World BEST, is an award previously provided by Brasil Telecom (formerly provided by Grupo Mantel, and later by Grupo GP) for websites in Brazil, now provided by iBest Global. The awards were given to websites chosen by either a popular or an official jury. The official jury compromises the people responsible for the award. The popular jury is compromised by internauts, who may vote and even recommend a website. Nowadays, only the popular jury and the academy may vote.

== Categories ==
There are currently 54 categories for the iBest award, separated in eleven different groups.

- Afnities
  - Kids
  - Women
  - Personalities
  - Religion and Esotericism
- Blogs
  - News
  - Humor
  - Technology
  - Varieties
  - Sports
  - Celebrities
  - Politics
- Citizenship
  - Social actions and NGOs
  - Education and Training
  - Government
  - Services to the citizen
  - Politics
- Electronic Commerce
  - E-Commerce
- Communication
  - Media & Communication
  - Podcast
- Finances / Insurance
  - Banks & Finances
  - Insurance
- Industry
  - Drink & Food
  - Electro-Electronics
  - Computer-related
  - Vehicles
- Leisure
  - Arts & Culture
  - Cinema
  - Entertainment
  - Sports
  - Soccer
  - Games
  - Music
  - Radio
  - Health
  - Television
  - Tourism
  - Sport fishing
- Videos
  - Comedy
  - Documentary
  - Sports
  - Short subjects
  - Animation

== Sites that earned iBest Award ==
- Gr@tis (19 times awarded 1st place in several categories) http://www.gratis.com.br
- Charges.com.br
- UOL
