= Vai na Fé =

- Genre: Telenovela
- Created by: Rosane Svartman
- Written by: Mário Viana; Renata Corrêa; Pedro Alvarenga; Renata Sofia; Fabrício Santiago; Sabrina Rosa
- Directed by: Paulo Silvestrini; Cristiano Marques
- Starring: Sheron Menezzes; Carolina Dieckmann; Emilio Dantas; Samuel de Assis; José Loreto
- Opening theme: "Vai dar Certo" by Negra Li ft. MC Liro
- Composers: MC Liro and MC GM
- Country of origin: Brazil
- Original language: Portuguese
- No. of seasons: 1
- No. of episodes: 179

Production
- Producer: Mariana Pinheiro
- Production company: Estúdios Globo

Original release
- Network: TV Globo
- Release: 16 January – 11 August 2023

Vai na Fé (English title: Never Give Up) is a Brazilian telenovela created by Rosane Svartman. It aired on TV Globo from 16 January to 11 August 2023. The telenovela follows Sol (Sheron Menezzes), a church choir singer who decides to become a back-up singer for Lui Lorenzo (José Loreto), in order to fix her family's financial difficulties. Carolina Dieckmann, Emilio Dantas, and Samuel de Assis also star.

== Plot ==
In her youth, Sol (Sheron Menezzes) gave up her dream of becoming a funk singer to become an Evangelical and marry Carlão (Che Moais). However, 20 years later, Sol receives an invitation to be a back-up singer for the declining singer Lui Lorenzo (José Loreto), after being discovered singing while selling boxed lunches in downtown Rio de Janeiro. With two daughters to raise and an unemployed husband, Sol accepts, but the decision turns her life upside down: she gains more and more fame and is harassed in church for her "worldly" behavior, as well as facing Lui's infatuation and reuniting with Ben (Samuel de Assis), her love from her youth who never forgot her. This reunion calls into question Ben's marriage to Lumiar (Carolina Dieckmann), a tough and controlling lawyer, and Lui's half-sister.

== Cast ==
=== Main ===
- Sheron Menezzes as Solange "Sol" da Silva Carvalho
  - Jê Soares as Young Sol
- Carolina Dieckmann as Lumiar Lorenzo Garcia
  - Hanna Romanazzi as Young Lumiar
- Emilio Dantas as Theo Camargo Bastos
  - Matheus Polis as Young Theo
- Samuel de Assis as Benjamin "Ben" Garcia
  - Isacque Lopes as Young Ben
- José Loreto as Lui Lorenzo Campos
  - Pedro Burgarelli as Child Lui
- Regiane Alves as Clara Albuquerque Bastos
- Bella Campos as Jenifer Daiane da Silva Carvalho Bastos
- Elisa Lucinda as Marlene Gonzaga
  - Rhavine Chrispim as Young Marlene
- Carla Cristina Cardoso as Bruna
  - Dhara Lopes as Young Bruna
- Luis Lobianco as Vítor "Vitinho" de Oliveira Sena
  - Anderson Oli as Young Vitinho
- Marcos Veras as Simas (Evilásio Simas Neto)
  - Marcus Maria as Young Simas
- Letícia Salles as Érika Teixeira / Érika "Ventania"
- Che Moais as Carlos "Carlão" Eduardo Carvalho
  - Mateus Honori as Young Carlão
- Cláudia Ohana as Dora Lorenzo
- Zé Carlos Machado as Fábio Lorenzo
  - Hugo Caramello as Young Fábio
- Jonathan Haagensen as Orfeu Caruso
  - Nicollas Paixão as Young Orfeu
- Mel Maia as Guilhermina "Guiga" de Alcântara Azevedo
- Henrique Barreira as Frederico "Fred"
- Jean Paulo Campos as Yuri dos Santos
- Gabriel Contente as Otávio "Tatá" Martins de Lemos
- Caio Manhente as Rafael "Rafa" de Albuquerque Bastos
- Flora Camolese as Maria Beatriz "Bia"
- Clara Serrão as Isabela "Bella" Vieira
- MC Cabelinho as Hugo de Oliveira
- Orlando Caldeira as "Anthony Verão" (Antônio Araújo)
- Priscila Steinman as Helena Weinberg
- Azzy as Ivy "Furacão" (Ivy Gouveia)
- Tati Villela as Naira
- Lucas Oradovschi as Jairo Damasceno
- Neyde Braga as Neide Batista Nascimento
- Waldo Piano as Joel Batista Nascimento
- Alan Oliveira as DJ Cidão
- Adriano Canindé as Pastor Miguel
- Clara Moneke as Kate Cristina Ramos
- Manu Estevão as Maria Eduarda "Duda" Carvalho da Silva
- Nego Ney as Gil
- Felipe Rodrigues as Bryan
- Nathália Costa as Meire
- Renata Sorrah as Wilma Campos
  - Anna Pimenta as Young Wilma

=== Recurring ===
- Theo Parizzi as Vicente
- Laiza Santos as Alice Ferraris
- Bruno Padilha as Emílio de Alcântara Azevedo
- Zé Wendell as Carlos / "Charles Pierre"
- Cris Werson as Sabrina
- Giuliano Laffayete as Fabrício Santiago
- Duda Moreira as Niltão
- Miguel Emidio as Erick
- Pedro Camargo as Kaduzinho
- Renata Miryanova as Sheila Palhares
- Ubiraci Miranda as Jefferson

=== Guest stars ===
- Deborah Secco as Alexia Máximo
- Antônio Calloni as "Stuart Philips" / Aristides Formiga
- Samara Felippo as Vera Castro Caldas
- Otávio Augusto as Aurélio
- Rafael Baronesi as Dr. Jorge
- Bruno Garcia as Marcos Lorençato
- Clara Tiezzi as Talita de Andrade
- Christiane Torloni
- Ludmilla
- Maiara & Maraisa
- Mariana Ximenes
- Fábio Porchat
- Glória Perez
- João Emanuel Carneiro
- Negra Li
- Walcyr Carrasco
- Luciano Huck
- Lulu Santos
- Cynthia Lee Fontaine
- Fátima Bernardes
- Diego Montez as Willian Carneiro
- Sofia Starling as Gisela
- Jade Cardoso as Letícia

== Production ==
In October 2021, Rosane Svartman's synopsis was approved by TV Globo, with the working title being Tente Outra Vez. The telenovela was scheduled to premiere in November 2022. However, so that it wouldn't be disrupted by the coverage of the 2022 FIFA World Cup, the premiere was postponed to January 2023. Filming of the telenovela began in October 2022, in Nova Friburgo, Lumiar and São Pedro da Serra. On 13 December 2022, the first teaser for the telenovela was released.

== Ratings ==
Season	Episodes	First aired		Last aired		Avg. viewers (points)
Season	Episodes	Date	Viewers (points)	Date	Viewers (points)	Avg. viewers (points)
1	179	16 January 2023	22.4	11 August 2023	26.7	23.3
