= List of Globoplay original programming =

Globoplay is a Brazilian subscription video on demand service owned by Grupo Globo. The service offers original shows, content newly aired on Grupo Globo's broadcast properties, and content from TV Globo's library, along with live streams of the local TV Globo affiliate's main channel, where available.

== Original programming ==
=== Drama ===
Title	Genre	Premiere	Seasons/episodes
Carcereiros	Police procedural	June 8, 2017	3 seasons, 33 episodes
Treze Dias Longe do Sol	Drama	November 2, 2017	1 season, 10 episodes
Assédio	Drama	September 21, 2018	1 season, 10 episodes
Ilha de Ferro	Action drama	November 14, 2018	2 season, 22 episodes
Aruanas	Thriller	July 2, 2019	2 seasons, 20 episodes
A Divisão	Crime drama	July 19, 2019	4 seasons, 20 episodes
Arcanjo Renegado	Thriller	February 7, 2020	4 seasons, 40 episodes
Desalma	Supernatural drama	October 22, 2020	2 seasons, 20 episodes
As Five	Drama	November 12, 2020	3 seasons, 26 episodes
Onde Está Meu Coração	Drama	May 4, 2021	1 season, 10 episodes
Rota 66: A Polícia que Mata	Drama	September 22, 2022	1 season, 8 episodes
Todas as Flores	Drama	October 19, 2022	1 season, 85 episodes
Os Outros	Drama	May 31, 2023	3 seasons, 36 episodes
A Vida pela Frente	Drama	June 22, 2023	1 season, 10 episodes
As Aventuras de José e Durval	Biopic	August 18, 2023	1 season, 8 episodes
Codex 632	Police procedural	October 19, 2023	1 season, 6 episodes
The End	Drama	October 25, 2023	1 season, 10 episodes
Rio Connection	Action drama	November 23, 2023	1 season, 8 episodes
Betinho - No Fio da Navalha	Biopic	December 1, 2023	1 season, 8 episodes
O Jogo que Mudou a História	Drama	June 13, 2024	1 season, 10 episodes
Guerreiros do Sol	Drama	June 11, 2025	1 season, 45 episodes
Raul Seixas: Eu Sou	Biopic	June 26, 2025	1 season, 8 episodes
Dias Perfeitos	Psychological thriller	August 14, 2025	1 season, 8 episodes
Vermelho Sangue	Supernatural drama	October 2, 2025	1 season, 10 episodes
Reencarne	Supernatural drama	October 23, 2025	1 season, 9 episodes
Jogada de Risco	Sports drama	July 23, 2026	1 season, 8 episodes
Emergência 53	Medical drama	August 20, 2026	1 season, 10 episodes
Awaiting release

=== Comedy ===
Title	Genre	Premiere	Seasons/episodes
Brasil a bordo	Sitcom	May 4, 2017	1 season, 12 episodes
Filhos da Pátria	Comedy	August 3, 2017	2 seasons, 22 episodes
Além da Ilha	Comedy thriller	September 6, 2018	1 season, 10 episodes
It's a Match	Comedy	June 7, 2019	1 season, 12 episodes
Eu, a Avó e a Boi	Comedy	November 29, 2019	1 season, 6 episodes
Sinta-se em Casa	Sketch comedy	April 13, 2020	1 season, 179 episodes
Todas as Mulheres do Mundo	Romantic comedy	April 23, 2020	1 season, 12 episodes
Diário de um Confinado	Comedy	June 26, 2020	2 seasons, 18 episodes
Filhas de Eva	Comedy drama	March 8, 2021	1 season, 12 episodes
Turma da Mônica - A Série	Comedy	July 21, 2022	1 season, 8 episodes
Rensga Hits!	Musical comedy	August 3, 2022	3 seasons, 24 episodes
Encantado's	Comedy	November 18, 2022	3 seasons, 33 episodes
Vicky e a Musa	Musical comedy	July 19, 2023	2 seasons, 26 episodes
Humor Negro - A Série	Sketch comedy	August 21, 2023	1 season, 10 episodes
Cilada	Sitcom	May 21, 2024	2 seasons, 20 episodes
Os Parças: A Série	Sitcom	June 6, 2024	1 season, 10 episodes
Dr4g0n	Comedy drama	July 18, 2024	1 season, 8 episodes
Cosme e Damião: Quase Santos	Comedy	December 5, 2024	1 season, 10 episodes
Pablo & Luisão	Comedy	May 22, 2025	1 season, 16 episodes
Juntas e Separadas	Comedy drama	March 12, 2026	1 season, 10 episodes

=== Docu-series ===
Title	Genre	Premiere	Seasons/episodes
Marília Mendonça: Todos os Cantos	Docu-series	September 13, 2019	1 season, 4 episodes
Até o Fim - Flamengo Campeão da Libertadores 2019	Sport	November 29, 2019	1 season, 5 episodes
Marielle - O Documentário	Docu-series	March 12, 2020	1 season, 6 episodes
Em Nome de Deus	True crime	June 23, 2020	1 season, 6 episodes
Sandy e Junior: A História	Docu-series	July 10, 2020	1 season, 7 episodes
Tardezinha	Docu-series	October 15, 2020	1 season, 4 episodes
Por um Respiro	Docu-series	November 27, 2020	1 season, 6 episodes
40M²	Docu-series	December 28, 2020	1 season, 4 episodes
Retrospectiva 2020: Edição Globoplay	Docu-series	December 29, 2020	1 season, 5 episodes
Cartas para Eva	Docu-series	January 6, 2021	1 season, 5 episodes
Doutor Castor	Docu-series	February 11, 2021	1 season, 4 episodes
Predestinado	Sport	February 28, 2021	1 season, 4 episodes
A Corrida das Vacinas	Docu-series	April 8, 2021	1 season, 5 episodes
A Vida Depois do Tombo	Docu-series	April 29, 2021	1 season, 4 episodes
O Caso Evandro	True crime	May 13, 2021	1 season, 8 episodes
Meu Amigo Bussunda	Docu-series	June 16, 2021	1 season, 4 episodes
Lexa: Mostra Esse Poder	Docu-series	June 24, 2021	1 season, 5 episodes
Você Nunca Esteve Sozinha - O Doc de Juliette	Docu-series	June 29, 2021	1 season, 6 episodes
É Ouro! O Brilho do Brasil em Tóquio	Sport	September 2, 2021	1 season, 6 episodes
Retratos de uma Guerra Sem Fim	Docu-series	September 11, 2021	1 season, 4 episodes
A Corrida das Vacinas – Mercado Paralelo	Docu-series	September 30, 2021	1 season, 2 episodes
Orgulho Além da Tela	Docu-series	October 11, 2021	1 season, 3 episodes
Gil na Califórnia	Biography	December 9, 2021	1 season, 5 episodes
Gilberto Braga: Meu Nome é Novela	Biography	December 20, 2021	1 season, 3 episodes
Poesia Que Transforma	Docu-series	December 22, 2021	1 season, 5 episodes
Retrospectiva 2021: Edição Globoplay	Docu-series	December 27, 2021	1 season, 3 episodes
O Canto Livre de Nara Leão	Music/Biography	January 7, 2022	1 season, 5 episodes
O Caso Celso Daniel	True crime	January 27, 2022	1 season, 8 episodes
Elza e Mané: Amor em linhas tortas	Biography	March 10, 2022	1 season, 4 episodes
Casão: Num Jogo sem Regras	Biography	May 26, 2022	1 season, 4 episodes
Rock In Rio: A História	Music	August 2, 2022	1 season, 5 episodes
Hebe, Um Brinde à Vida	Biography	September 1, 2022	1 season, 4 episodes
Vale Tudo com Tim Maia	Biography	September 28, 2022	1 season, 3 episodes
Flordelis: Questiona ou Adora	True crime	November 4, 2022	1 season, 6 episodes
Vou Viver de HQ	Arts	November 25, 2022	1 season, 6 episodes
Gabriel Monteiro: Um Herói Fake	True crime	December 6, 2022	1 season, 4 episodes
Caminhos de Jesus	Biography	December 9, 2022	1 season, 4 episodes
Sou Corinthians	Sport	January 13, 2023	1 season, 4 episodes
Boate Kiss: A Tragédia de Santa Maria	True crime	January 27, 2023	1 season, 5 episodes
O Repórter do Poder	Biography	March 10, 2023	1 season, 4 episodes
Jessie e Colombo	Biography	March 29, 2023	1 season, 4 episodes
Galvão: Olha o Que Ele Fez	Biography	May 18, 2023	1 season, 5 episodes
Xuxa, o Documentário	Biography	July 13, 2023	1 season, 5 episodes

=== Variety and talk shows ===
Title	Genre	Premiere	Seasons/episodes
Sterblitch Não Tem um Talk Show: o Talk Show	Variety show	June 5, 2020	2 seasons, 21 episodes
Que Tal Um Pouco de Esperança e Boas Notícias?	Variety show	June 10, 2020	TBA
Cada Um no Seu Quadrado	Variety show	July 3, 2020	TBA
Casa Kalimann	Talk show	April 28, 2021	TBA
The Voice Kids no Parquinho	Aftershow	June 11, 2021	1 season, 17 episodes
Clube do Araújo	Musical	October 29, 2021	1 season, 5 episodes
Vestidas de Amor	Reality show	May 11, 2023	1 season, 6 episodes
Sobre Nós Dois	Talk Show	August 17, 2023	1 season, 10 episodes
The Taste Brasil	Reality show	September 26, 2023	TBA

=== Continuations ===
These shows have been picked up by Globoplay for additional seasons after having aired previous seasons on another network.

Title	Genre	Prev. network(s)	Premiere	Seasons
Sessão de Terapia (seasons 4, 5)	Drama	GNT	August 30, 2019	1 season, 35 episodes
Segunda Chamada (season 2)	Drama	TV Globo	September 10, 2021	1 season, 6 episodes
Vlog da Berê (season 2)	Fantasy	Gloob	October 12, 2021	1 season, 10 episodes
Verdades Secretas (season 2)	Drama	TV Globo	October 20, 2021	1 season, 50 episodes
Sob Pressão (season 5)	Drama	TV Globo	June 2, 2022	1 season, 12 episodes

== Original films and specials ==
=== Documentaries ===
Title	Premiere	Length
Gabriel Medina	January 31, 2020	1 hour, 19 min.
Cercados	December 3, 2020	2 hours
Uma Gota de Esperança	May 7, 2021	44 minutes
Erasmo 80	July 2, 2021	1 hour
O Caso Prevent Senior	December 16, 2021	1 hour

=== Music ===
Title	Premiere	Length
Luan Santana: Viva	August 23, 2019	1 hour
Sandy & Junior: Nossa História	July 17, 2020	2 hours
Tardezinha no Maraca	October 30, 2020	1 hour
Arnaldo, Sessenta	November 5, 2020	1 hour
Arraial do Gil	June 13, 2021	1 hour
Lulu Live	October 9, 2021	2 hours
Marisa Monte - Portas e Janelas	October 22, 2021	1 hour
Caetano 80 Anos	August 7, 2022	1 hour
Milton Nascimento: A Última Sessão de Música	November 13, 2022	2 hours
Barítono: Lulu 70 Anos	May 4, 2023	1 hour

=== Specials ===
Title	Premiere	Length
Sinta-se no Oscar 2021	April 25, 2021	4 hours
