= Humberto Carrão =

Brazilian actor (born 1991)

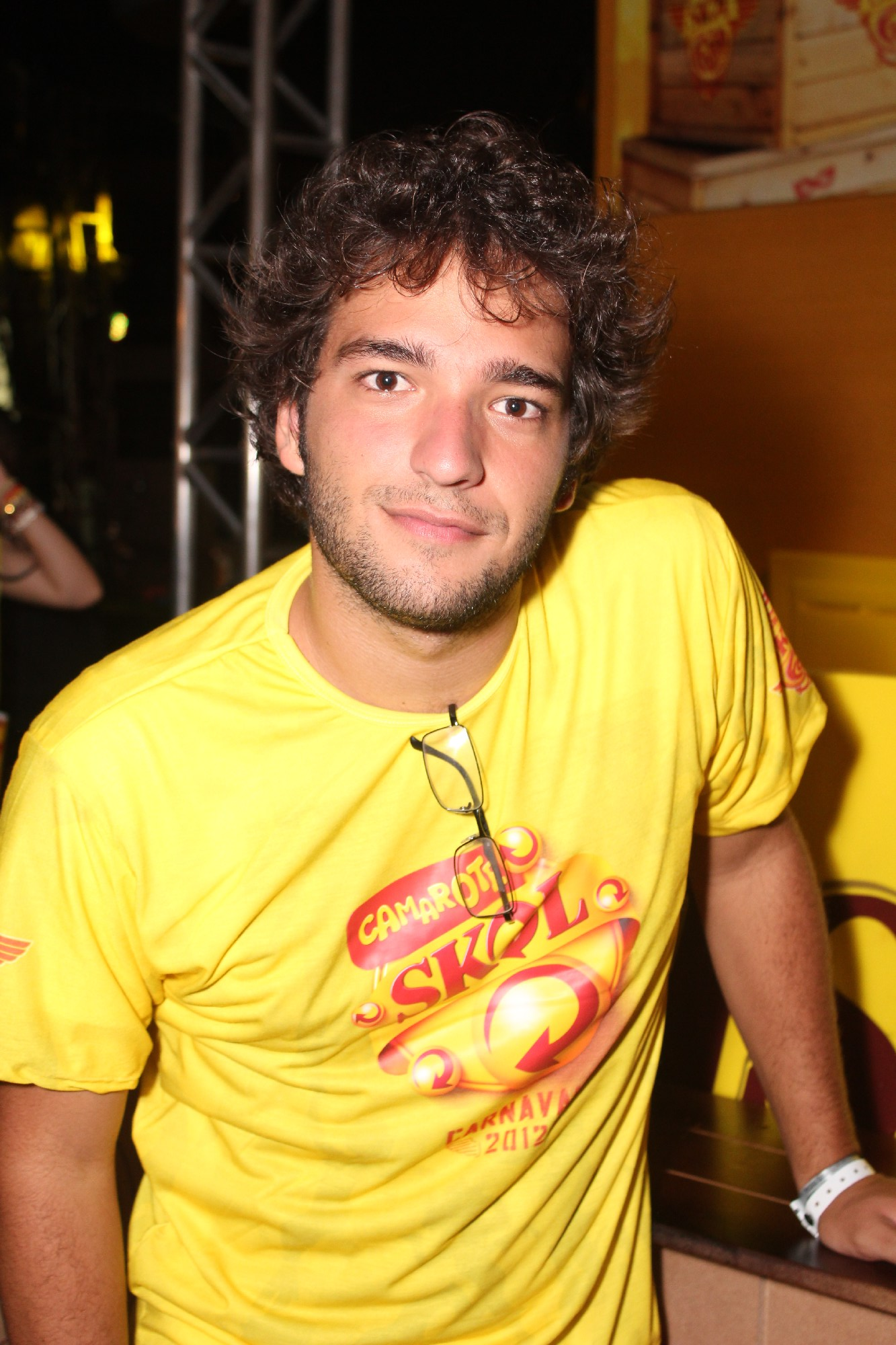
- Carrão in 2013.
- Born: Humberto Halbout Carrão Sinoti; 28 August 1991 (age 34); Rio de Janeiro, Brazil
- Occupation: Actor, presenter, director, screenwriter
- Years active: 2000–present
- Height: 1.77 m (5 ft 10 in)
- Awards: List

Humberto Halbout Carrão Sinoti (Brazilian Portuguese: [ũˈbɛʁtu kaˈʁɐ̃w]; born 28 August 1991) is a Brazilian actor, presenter, director and screenwriter.

== Career ==
=== 2000s ===
Humberto began his career in 2000, at the age of eight, in the series Bambuluá, playing Perversos, one of the boys in Magush's gang who wanted to destroy Bambuluá. In 2002, he was interviewed at his school by Alô, Vídeo Escola, on Canal Futura, during a program about pre-adolescence. In 2004, he played Diogo in the 11th season of Malhação, which was the most successful season of the series. In 2005, he joined the cast of the soap opera Bang Bang, playing Pablito. In 2005, he participated in an episode of Carga Pesada, a program starring Antônio Fagundes and Stênio Garcia, where he played the son of Vanessa Gerbelli's character in the series, receiving praise from Antônio Fagundes, who, when patting him on the back, said "muito bom hein". In 2007, the actor made a guest appearance on Sítio do Picapau Amarelo. In 2009, he returned to act in the series Malhação playing the villain Caio Lemgruber, who in the end ended up becoming the protagonist.

=== 2010s ===
In 2010, Carrão played Luti in the remake of Ti Ti Ti, a 1985 soap opera. To play this character, Humberto traveled to Spain to get references to compose it. Humberto was the drummer in the band “Olegários”, formed by him and his companions Helder Agostini and Felipe Basílio.

He acted in the soap opera Cheias de Charme, as Elano, the good-natured brother of Maria da Penha, played by Taís Araújo. He was the romantic partner of another protagonist of the plot, Maria Aparecida (Isabelle Drummond). In 2013 he plays the dangerous Fabinho in the soap opera Sangue Bom, a work that marks his second partnership with Isabelle Drummond. Just like his character Caio, Fabinho also regenerates little by little, after he truly falls in love with Giane, Isabelle's character. In 2014, he plays the programmer Davi in Now Generation, repeating once again the partnership with the authors Filipe Miguez and Izabel de Oliveira and with his soap opera partner Isabelle Drummond. In 2015, he presented the program Pausa Pro Café, on Canal Brasil, which talks about the country's short films. In the same year, he debuted his first work as director, screenwriter and producer in the award-winning short film À Festa. À Guerra, which participated in 18 festivals in and outside Brazil, winning eight awards. The following year, he directed his second short film, also award-winning, Regeneração. In 2016, he made his primetime debut as the womanizer Tiago in A Lei do Amor, forming a love triangle with Isabella Santoni and Alice Wegmann. From 2019 to 2021, he acted in the soap opera Amor de Mãe, by Manuela Dias, in the role of Sandro, who as a baby was sold by his mother Vitória (Taís Araújo) in adolescence and was raised in a favela by a baby trafficker, Kátia (Vera Holtz).

=== 2020s ===
In 2020, he wrote his first feature film with the author Ana Maria Gonçalves.

In 2022, he appears in double doses on Globoplay: in September, the series Rota 66: A Polícia que Mata premieres, anchored in the book of the same name by Caco Barcellos, the actor plays the protagonist, the journalist Caco; the plot delves into his biography, immersing himself in his professional trajectory marked by journalistic investigations such as the murder of three young people from São Paulo, discovering a group of killers that operates with the apparent approval of military justice. In October of the same year, he appears in Todas as Flores, divided into two parts, by João Emanuel Carneiro, where he plays one of the main characters, Rafael, heir to the villain played by Fábio Assunção who suffered a car accident as a teenager, and after three years living almost blind, he recovered his vision through a cornea transplant. He became a millionaire perfumer who created an inclusive program in his company that employs blind people, where he meets the visually impaired Maíra (Sophie Charlotte), the heroine of the plot, with whom he falls in love, even though he is dating Maíra's sister, the ambitious Vanessa (Letícia Colin).

Carrão returned to soap operas in 2024 with a participation in the remake of Renascer, a soap opera by Benedito Ruy Barbosa adapted by Bruno Luperi, where he played the protagonist José Inocêncio (Marcos Palmeira) in the first phase of the plot, making a romantic couple with Duda Santos, interpreter of Maria Santa.

== Personal life ==
During the recordings of the sixteenth season of the series Malhação, Carrão began dating the protagonist Bianca Bin, but the relationship lasted only ten months.

In 2012 he started dating actress Chandelly Braz, whom he met during the filming of the soap opera Cheias de Charme. In 2022, after 10 years together, the couple decided to end their relationship.

He is a fan of Clube de Regatas Flamengo, and is often seen at the club's games.

== Filmography ==
=== Television ===
| Year | Title | Role | Notes |
|---|---|---|---|
| 2001 | Bambuluá | Perverso | Seasons 1–2 |
| 2002 | Alô, Vídeo Escola | Alberto | Episode: "August 13, 2002" |
| 2004–2005 | Malhação | Diogo Soares da Costa | Season 11 |
| 2005–2006 | Bang Bang | Pablito Bolivar | |
| 2005 | Carga Pesada | Augusto | Episode: "Homem de Família" |
| 2007 | Sítio do Picapau Amarelo | Caipora | Season 7 |
| 2008 | Por Toda Minha Vida | Rafael's friend | Episode: "Mamonas Assassinas" |
| 2009–2010 | Malhação | Caio Lemgruber | Season 16 |
| 2010–2011 | Ti Ti Ti | Luís Otávio Martins "Luti" | |
| 2011 | Aquele Beijo | Contest Presenter | Episode: "17 October 2011" |
| 2012 | Dercy de Verdade | Arnald | Episode: "January 12th" |
| 2012 | Cheias de Charme | Elano Fragoso | |
| 2013 | Sangue Bom | Fábio Queiroz Campana "Fabinho" | |
| 2014 | Geração Brasil | Davi Reis/Davi Marra Schmidt | |
| 2015–2020 | Pausa pro Café | Presenter | |
| 2016 | A Lei do Amor | Tiago Leitão | |
| 2018 | Sob Pressão | Dr. Henrique Figueira | Season 2 |
| 2019–2021 | Amor de Mãe | Sandro Amorim Camargo | |
| 2022 | Rota 66 - A Polícia que Mata | Caco Barcellos | |
| 2022–2023 | Todas as Flores | Rafael Martínez Barreto | |
| 2023 | Jessie & Colombo | Colombo Vieira de Souza (voice) | |
| 2023 | Betinho - No Fio da Navalha | Henfil | |
| 2024 | Renascer | Young José Inocêncio | Episodes: "January 22–February 5" |
| 2025 | Vale Tudo | Afonso Almeida Roitman | |

=== Film ===
As an actor
| Year | Title | Role |
|---|---|---|
| 2016 | Felizes Para Sempre | Hugo |
| 2016 | Aquarius | Diego |
| 2016 | Aurora | Bruno |
| 2017 | O Animal Cordial | Magno |
| 2018 | Paraíso Perdido | Pedro |
| 2021 | Marighella | Humberto |
| 2024 | Dona Lurdes - O Filme | Sandro |
| 2024 | I'm Still Here | Félix |
| 2025 | Paságarda | Manuel |

As director, screenwriter, editing and producer
| Year | Title | Notes |
|---|---|---|
| 2015 | À Festa. À Guerra | Short film |
| 2016 | Regeneração | Short film |

== Stage ==
| Year | Title | Role | Ref. |
|---|---|---|---|
| 2014 | Confissões de um Poeta aos 10 Anos de Idade | He | |

== Awards and nominations ==
| Year | Award | Category | Work nominated | Result |
|---|---|---|---|---|
| 2006 | Prêmio Contigo! de TV | Best Child Actor | Bang Bang | Nominated |
| 2009 | Capricho Awards | National Eye Drops | Malhação | Nominated |
| 2010 | Capricho Awards | Best National Actor | Ti Ti Ti | Nominated |
| 2010 | Capricho Awards | National Eye Drops | Ti Ti Ti | Nominated |
| 2012 | Prêmio Contigo! de TV | Best Supporting Actor | Cheias de Charme | Nominated |
| 2013 | Prêmio Quem de Televisão | Best Actor | Sangue Bom | Nominated |
| 2014 | Prêmio Contigo! de TV | Best Soap Opera Actor | Sangue Bom | Nominated |
| 2015 | Festival de Cinema de Vitória | Best Film | À Festa. À Guerra | Won |
| 2015 | Festival de Cinema de Vitória | Best Sound Design | À Festa. À Guerra | Won |
| 2015 | Festival de Cinema de Caruaru | Best Direction | À Festa. À Guerra | Won |
| 2015 | Festival de Cinema de Caruaru | Best Film | À Festa. À Guerra | Won |
| 2015 | Curta Taquary | Best Direction | À Festa. À Guerra | Won |
| 2016 | Prêmio Quem de Cinema | Best Film Actor | Aquarius | Won |
| 2016 | Festival Curta-Brasília | Best Montage by the Official Jury | Regeneração | Won |
| 2016 | Festival de Cinema de Vitória | Best Film by the Official Jury | Regeneração | Won |
| 2020 | Prêmio Break Tudo | Best Brazilian Actor | Amor de Mãe | Nominated |
| 2020 | Melhores do Ano Minha Novela | Best Supporting Actor | Amor de Mãe | Nominated |
| 2020 | Troféu Internet | Best Soap Opera Actor | Amor de Mãe | Nominated |
| 2022 | Festival Sesc Melhores Filmes | Best National Actor | Marighella | Nominated |
| 2022 | Grande Prêmio do Cinema Brasileiro | Best Supporting Actor | Marighella | Nominated |
| 2023 | Prêmio Platino | Best Male Performance in a Series | Rota 66: A Polícia que Mata | Nominated |
| 2023 | SEC Awards | Best Actor in a National Series | Rota 66: A Polícia que Mata | Nominated |
| 2024 | SEC Awards | Best Actor on a Telenovela | Renascer | Nominated |
| 2024 | Prêmio Noticiasdetv.com | Best Actor in a Guest Appearance | Renascer | Pending |
| 2024 | Melhores do Ano Natelinha | Best Actor | Renascer | Pending |
