= Barata Ribeiro, 716 =

2016 film directed by Domingos de Oliveira

- Directed by: Domingos de Oliveira
- Written by: Domingos de Oliveira
- Starring: Sophie Charlotte; Caio Blat
- Cinematography: Luca Pougy; Felipe Roque
- Edited by: Tina Saphira
- Release date: September 2, 2016
- Running time: 85 minutes
- Country: Brazil
- Language: Portuguese

Barata Ribeiro, 716 is a 2016 Brazilian film directed by Domingos de Oliveira and starring Sophie Charlotte and Caio Blat. It won the best film award at the 44th Gramado Film Festival.

== Plot ==
In 1960s Rio de Janeiro, aspiring writer Felipe leads a life of wild parties held in an apartment in the famous Barata Ribeiro street in Copacabana. There he and his friends enjoy freedom even in the midst of a complicated political moment.

== Cast ==
- Sophie Charlotte as Gilda
- Caio Blat as Felipe
- Gabriel Antunes
- Álamo Facó
- Maria Ribeiro
- Glauce Guima
- Matheus Souza
- Pedro Cardoso
- Sergio Guizé
- Aleta Valente
- Lívia de Bueno
- Daniel Dantas
