= Vilma Melo =

Brazilian actress and director

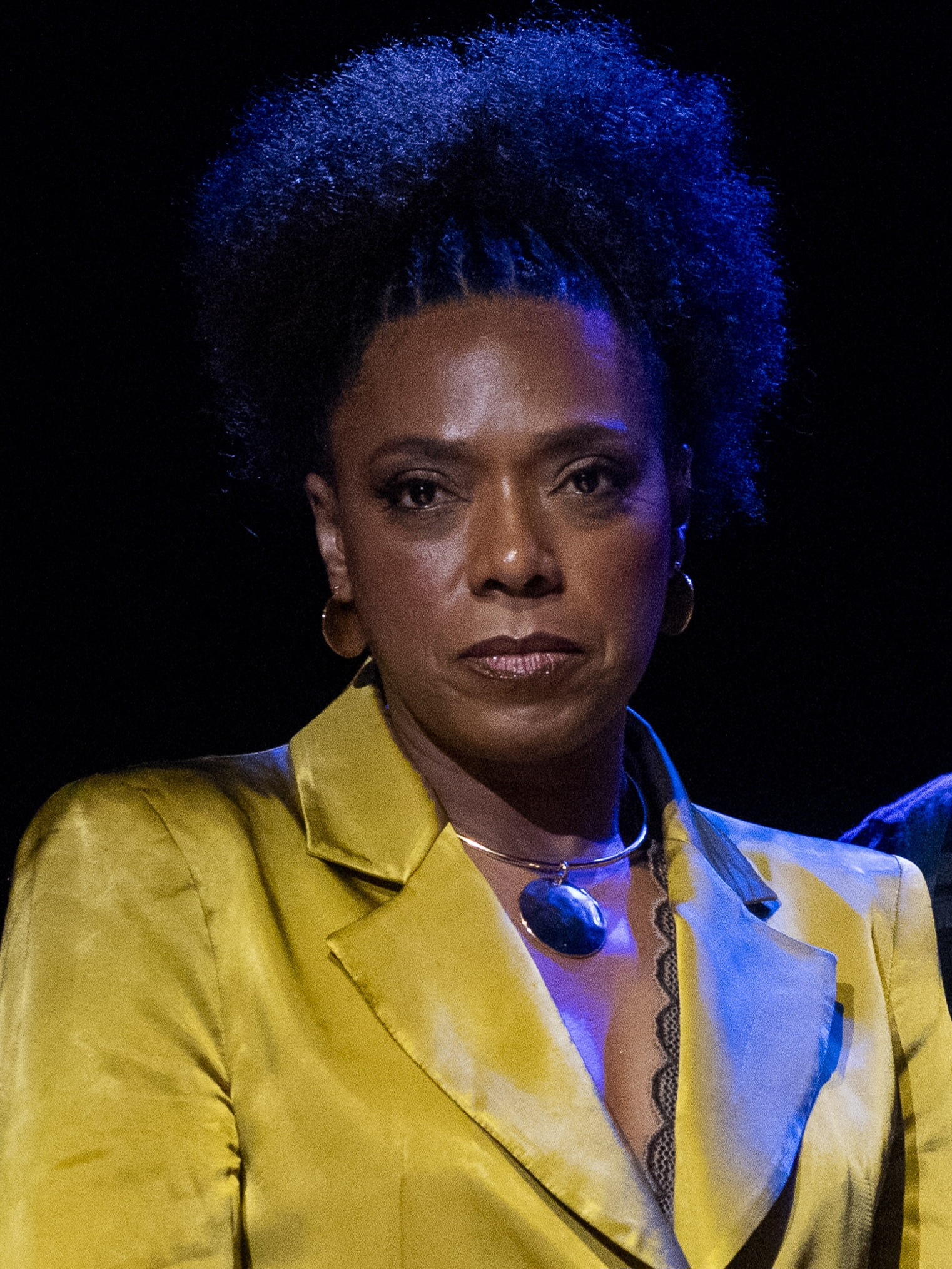
- Melo in 2023.
- Born: 13 June 1969 (age 57); Rio de Janeiro, Brazil
- Occupations: Actress, director, professor, theatre producer

Vilma Melo (born 13 June 1969) is a Brazilian actress, director, and professor. A graduate in performing arts from the Federal University of the State of Rio de Janeiro (UNIRIO), Melo became famous for her works in theatre, and later on, in her works in television and film. She has won various prizes, including the Prêmio Shell, becoming the first Black woman to win the award, and a Prêmio Cenym, along with a nomination for the Prêmio APTR de Teatro.

Melo began her career at the end of the 1980s. Her professional debut was in the special Metrópole in 1987. Since then, she has gone on to participate in numerous specials, performing not just as an actress, but also as a director and the person who envisioned the ideas in various projects. These include A Farsa do Fanático Torcedor (1995), The Canterville Ghost (1998), Grande Othelo – Êta Moleque Bamba! (2004), O Romance do Pavão Misterioso (2006), A Farsa da Boa Preguiça (2009), Amargo Fruto - A Vida de Billie Holliday (2016), and Mãe de Santo (2022).

She became the first Black actress to win the Prêmio Shell for Best Actress for her performance in the musical Chica da Silva, where she portrays the titular protagonist. In cinemas, her debut was in the comedy Chick Thing in 2005. In recent years, she became recognized for her roles in films such as Three Summers (2019), Selvagem (2021), Reação em Cadeia (2021), União Instável (2023), and Ritmo de Natal (2023). She received a nomination for the Prêmio Shell for Best Actress in 2023 for her performance on Mãe de Santo (2022).

On television, her debut role was a special guest appearance on Cidade dos Homens (2002) on TV Globo. She had many minor roles in the following years, including Avenida Brasil (2012), Joia Rara (2013), Segunda Chamada (2019) and Um Lugar ao Sol (2022). Meanwhile, she portrayed the protagonist in the series Encantado's (2022) for which she became famed for her role as the Olímpia, the owner of a supermarket, where the series is based. The series led to Melo becoming widely recognized in Brazil, which her earning the Ordem do Mérito Cultural in 2025.

== Biography ==
Melo was born in the Realengo neighborhood of Rio de Janeiro on 13 June 1969. She comes from a family of modest means that did not have many links to the artistic world. At 17 years old, she decided to enroll in performing arts courses, taking the vestibular and enrolling at the Federal University of the State of Rio de Janeiro (UNIRIO). She graduated with her bachelor's degree and became licensed.

She has given her name to the recently reopened Diretório Acadêmico do CLA at UNIRIO, having been named the "Diretório Acadêmico Vilma Melo". She also participated in discussion panels (Rodas de Conversas) at events and lectured at universities such as UNIRIO and the Pontifical Catholic University of Rio de Janeiro.

== Career ==
=== 1987–2009: Graduation and first works ===
Melo's first contacts with the performing arts were made while at UNIRIO in 1987. Her first special was a performance for the play Metrópole, organized by a crew from her university. Since then, Melo came to become part of performances of various theatrical specials, which consolidated into her presence on stages in Rio de Janeiro in the following decades. In 1995, she performed in A Farsa do Fanático Torcedor, directed by Mônica Alvarenga. The piece won awards at the 5th Festival Carioca de Novos Talentos in 1995, and was performed in other theatres in 1996 and in June 1998. Based on two football-fanatic friends during the 1994 World Cup, she plays the role of Armínia, the sister-in-law of one of the protagonists.

Since 1995, Melo has been a teacher in Rio de Janeiro and, since 2004, she has become dedicated to classes, projects and theatrical performances at the Calouste Gulbenkian Art Cetnre, where she taught a course of excellence that was artistically free, broad, and at no cost. In 1998, she participated in a performance of Leo Tolstoy's The Death of Ivan Ilyich, directed by Gillray Coutinho. That year, she was in the cast for a performance of O Jogo do Amor, directed by Antonio Guedes. In the piece, she played Arlequim. Still in 1998, once again with Guedes as director, she was the protagonist, along with Oscar Saraiva, in a performance of The Canterville Ghost, based on the work by Oscar Wilde. In 1999, she also appeared in the music video for "O Que Sobrou do Céu" by O Rappa, directed by Kátia Lund.

In 2002, she realized her first appearance on TV during a small appearance on an episode on the series Cidade dos Homens on TV Globo. In 2004, she returned to the theatre stage for the musical Grande Othelo – Êta Moleque Bamba!, where she played the role of famed actor Grande Otelo in his childhood. The piece retells the story of his life and career. She starred alongside Flávio Bauraqui and Maurício Tizumba, all interpreting Grande Otelo at different phases in his life. In 2005, Melo made her debut in cinemas with the comedy Chick Thing, by Eliana Fonseca. In the film, she plays Lia.

In 2006, she received the prize for Best Supporting Actress from the 1st Festival de Teatro de Campos dos Goytacazes for her performance in the children's play O Romance do Pavão Misterioso, by Theotonio de Paiva. From 2009 to 2011, she was a part of the cast of the comedy musical A Farsa da Boa Preguiça, with text by Ariano Suassuna and directed by João das Neves. Other members of the cast included Guilherme Piva, Bianca Byington, Jackson Costa e Daniela Fontan. She plays Andreza. In 2009, she returned to television to act in an episode of the police drama A Lei e o Crime, on RecordTV, as Arminda.

=== 2010–2019: Start in theatre and more space in television ===
In 2011, Melo returned to TV Globo, participating in an episode of the third season of the seriesForça-Tarefa, where she made a small appearance as a receptionist at a hospital. In 2012, she made her first appearance in a novela in Avenida Brasil, by João Emanuel Carneiro, at TV Globo. She played the role of Conceição, alongside Débora Bloch. In 2013, she became part of the main cast of Joia Rara, which won an International Emmy for Best Telenovela. She played Fátima. That same year, she returned to the theatre stage with the musical Quando A Gente Ama, by João Batista. She played alongside Cris Vianna, Patrícia Costa, Édio Nunes, Milton Filho, Wladimir Pinheiro, David Junior, and Jéssica Moraes.

In 2014, she became the director of Lapinha, starring Isabel Fillardis and Zezeh Barbosa, alongside Edio Nunes. The piece portrays the life of artist Joaquina Maria Conceição da Lapa, "Lapinha" (played by Fillardis), a singer whose talent is less well known in the history of Brazilian culture. That same year, she directed Acabou o Pó, with the script written by Daniel Porto.

In 2016, she acted in her second work in theatres playing a waitress in the drama Campo Grande, by Sandra Kogut. In 2016, she worked with Piéterson Duderstadt to release the children's special Marrom, Nem Preto Nem Branco?, written by Renata Mizrahi and directed by Marcelo Alonso Neves. Melo took part in the preparation, production, and cast of the special. She also won the Prêmio Cenym de Teatro for Best Supporting Actress for her performance in Amargo Fruto - A Vida de Billie Holliday. Starring Lílian Valeska in the titular role, Melo completed the cast with Milton Filho, singing and giving life to various personalities that were influences in the life of singer Billie Holiday.

In 2017, she interpreted Chica da Silva in the theatre piece Chica da Silva - O Musical, which became one of the biggest successes of her career. The piece, written by Mizrahi, is not limited to be a biography of Silva; Mizrahi, along with bringing biographical moments, sought to contextualize her in the 21st century and highlight that, despite her story initially being set more than 200 years ago, racism still affects the Black community. Melo's performance as the protagonist was widely acclaimed by critics and she became the first Black actress to win thePrêmio Shell de Teatro for best actress, one of the most traditional awards in national theatre.

In 2017 still, she was in Fulaninha e Dona Coisa, which was originally released in 1990 and now with an interpretation by Eduardo Barata, text by Noemi Marinho and directed by Daniel Herz. She starred alongside Nathalia Dill, where they interpreted Fulaninha and Dona Coisa, respectively. In the following years, she would also act in Isso Vai Funcionar de Alguma Forma (2018), a theatre piece composed entirely by women, with 5 actresses, 4 dramaturgists, and 4 directors, along with acting in Favela 2 – A Gente Não Desiste (2018), Primeira Morte (2018), Vale Night (2019), Saia (2019), and Noite do Sorriso Negro (2019). In cinemas, she played roles in short films such as Rose in Castigo (2017), as the mother in Prefiro não ser Identificada (2018), and a participation in A Incrível História do Homem Desalmado (2019). She also took part in the webseries Onde Está Mariana?, produced and released on Instagram by actress Cleo in 2019. The series is part of the "Cleo on Demand" project and broaches the subject of violence against women.

In 2019, she worked again with Kogut in the dramatic comedy Três Verões. In the film starring Regina Casé, she plays Cida alongside Casé, Jéssica Ellen, Edmilson Barros, and Paulo Verlings. Also in 2019, she had guest appearances in Baile de Máscaras on AXN, Sob Pressão, on TV Globo, and Psi, on HBO. The same year, she became more famous for her role as Maria Expedita on Segunda Chamada. In series, which tackles the daily lives of a night school in the periphery of São Paulo, she plays a woman who resolves to study during a difficult moment in her life.

=== 2020–present: Lead roles in television and recognition ===
In 2021, the drama Selvagem, by Diego da Costa, was released in theatres. She plays Maria Elisa, the mother of one of the students organizing the occupation of their school to demand better study conditions. Despite having been released in theatres in 2021, the film was filmed in 2018 and had been shown at film festivals starting in 2019. She also took part in the Márcio Garcia action film Reação em Cadeia in 2021. She played the role of Delegada Queiroz. She also returned to direct theatre pieces with the play Meus Cabelos de Baobá, starring Anna Paula Black. She later starred in an episode of 5X Comédia, on Amazon Prime Video, substituting Yara de Novaes.

At the beginning of 2022, she made a guest appearance on Um Lugar ao Sol, by TV Globo, this time playing the role of Layla, a police officer who helps Stephany, the victim of domestic violence who is played by Renata Gaspar. That same year, she played her most famous role to date as the protagonist of the comedy series Encantado's, which was first shown on Globoplay and later on TV Globo. In the series, she stars alongside Luís Miranda as Olímpia. For this role, she rose to prominence nationally. She later starred in the action-comedy Me Tira da Mira in a guest appearance as Marta, as well as on the Netflix film Vizinhos as Dr. Vera. In December 2022, she returned to wide acclaim as one of the lead actors in the monologue Mãe de Santo, where she portrayed various Black women. Mãe de Santo portrays a proud and firm position in relation to stories told through generations, documenting how Afro-Brazilian women are protagonists of sacred dialogues, as people who have bodily autonomy and where Black men complement their narratives and experiences. Under the general direction of Luiz Antonio Pilar, the special was developed by Renata Mizrahi and based on texts and reports by philosopher, writer and professor Helena Theodoro. For her role, she was nominated for the Prêmio APTR and the Prêmio Shell for Best Theatre Actress.

In 2023, she took part in the second season of Encantado's e and, afterwards, dedicated herself to theatre, this time directing a theatre play set during the Paraguayan War. Guasu, written by Bruce de Araújo, is a musical that recounts the history of 5 Brazilian soldiers that, after an attack, are separated from their battalion and need to return together to Brazil through the borderlands of Mato Grosso do Sul. That same year, she was part of the cast of the series Amar É Para os Fortes, on Amazon Prime Video, which recounts the drama between mothers who have to confront violence in their communities. She was also in the Netflix romantic comedy film União Instável. At the end of the year, she starred in the Christmas romantic-comedy film Ritmo de Natal. She plays Soraya Suyane, also known as Mulher Damasco, former funk performer and mother to protagonist Mileny, played by Clara Moneke. They play alongside Taís Araújo, Paulo Tiefenthaler, and Teca Pereira. She is currently starring in the telenovela Dona de Mim as Jussara.

== Theatre ==
Year	Title	Role	Notes
1995–98	A Farsa do Fanático Torcedor	Armínia	
1998	The Death of Ivan Ilyich		
1998	O Jogo do Amor	Arlequim	
1998	The Canterville Ghost	Ghost	
2004–06	Grande Othelo – Êta Moleque Bamba!	Grande Otelo (child)	
2006	O Romance do Pavão Misterioso		
2009–11	A Farsa da Boa Preguiça	Andreza, the Cancachorra	
2013	Quando A Gente Ama		
2014	Lapinha		Director
2014	Acabou o Pó		Director
2016	Marrom, Nem Preto Nem Branco?	Linda	She was also the producer who conceived of the play
2016	Amargo Fruto - A Vida de Billie Holliday	Various roles	
2017	Chica da Silva - O Musical	Chica da Silva	
2017	Fulaninha e Dona Coisa	Dona Coisa	
2018	Isso Vai Funcionar de Alguma Forma	Mulher	
2018	Favela 2 – A Gente Não Desiste	Dona Vilma	
2018	Primeira Morte		
2019	Vale Night	Virgínia	
2019	Saia	Aquiles	
2019	Noite do Sorriso Negro	Various roles	
2021	Meus Cabelos de Baobá		Director
2022–23	Mãe de Santo	Various roles	
2023	Guasu		Director

=== Television ===
Year	Title	Role	Notes
2002	Cidade dos Homens	Woman on the street	Episode: "Correio"
2006	Prova de Amor	Dona Amália	Episodes: "17–21 de janeiro"
2009	A Lei e o Crime	Arminda	
2011	Força-Tarefa	Hospital receptionist	Episode: "15 de dezembro"
2012	Avenida Brasil	Conceição	
2013	Jóia Rara	Fátima	
2019	Baile de Máscaras		
2019	Psi	Evelina Saldanha	Episode: "O Que Há de Errado Comigo?"
2019	Sob Pressão	Ruth	Episode: "9 de maio"
2019–21	Segunda Chamada	Maria Expedita Bessa da Silva	
2021	5X Comédia	Regina	Episode: "Sem Saída"
2022	Um Lugar ao Sol	Delegada Layla	Guest appearance
2022–presente	Encantado's	Olympia Ponza	
2023	Amar É Para os Fortes	Marilúcia	
2023	Tributo	Herself	Episode: "Léa Garcia"
2024	Dom	Conceição	Season 3
2025	Dona de Mim	Jussara Bezerra de Almeida	
2025	Tributo	Ela mesma	Episode: "Neusa Borges"

=== Film ===
Year	Title	Role	Notes
2005	Chick Thing	Lia	
2016	Campo Grande	Garçonete	
2017	Castigo	Rose	Short film
2018	Prefiro não ser Identificada	Mother	Short film
2019	A Incrível História do Homem Desalmado		Short film
2019	Unremember		
2019	Three Summers	Cida	
2021	Reação em Cadeia	Delegada Queiroz	
2021	Selvagem	Maria Elisa	
2022	Me Tira da Mira	Marta	
2022	Vizinhos	Dr. Vera	
2022	Naquele Dia Escuro	TV journalist (narration)	Short film
2023	União Instável	Catarina	
2023	Ritmo de Natal	Soraya Suyane (Mulher Damasco)	
2024	As Melhores	Maria	Short film

=== Internet ===
Year	Title	Role	Notes
2019	Onde Está Mariana?	Victim	Web-series

== Awards and nominations ==
Year	Entity	Category	Nomination	Result	Ref.
2006	Festival de Teatro de Campos dos Goytacazes	Best Supporting Actress	O Romance do Pavão Misterioso	Won	
2016	Prêmio Cenym de Teatro	Best Supporting Actress	Amargo Fruto - A Vida de Billie Holliday	Won	
2017	Prêmio Shell de Teatro	Best Actress	Chica da Silva - O Musical	Won	
2017	Prêmio Cesgranrio	Best Actress	Chica da Silva - O Musical	Nominated	
2017	Prêmio Botequim Cultural	Best Actress	Chica da Silva - O Musical	Nominated	
2017	Prêmio CBTIJ de Teatro	Best Actress	Marrom, nem Preto nem Branco?	Nominated	
2017	Prêmio CEPETIN	Best Actress	Marrom, nem Preto nem Branco?	Nominated	
2017	Prêmio Aplauso Brasil	Best Cast (People's Jury)	Fulaninha e Dona Coisa	Won	
2018	Prêmio Questão de Crítica	Best Actress	Balé Ralé	Won	
2022	Pena de Prata	Best Cast in a Comedy Series	Encantado's	Nominated	
2022	Pena de Prata	Best Revelation Performance in a Comedy Series	Encantado's	Nominated	
2022	Prêmio APTR	Actress in Protagonist Role	Mãe de Santo	Nominated	
2023	Prêmio Shell de Teatro	Best Actress	Mãe de Santo	Nominated	
2023	Prêmio Brasileiro de Teledramaturgia PBT	Best Actress in Comedy Series	Encantado's	Won	
