= Maria Ribeiro =

Brazilian actress

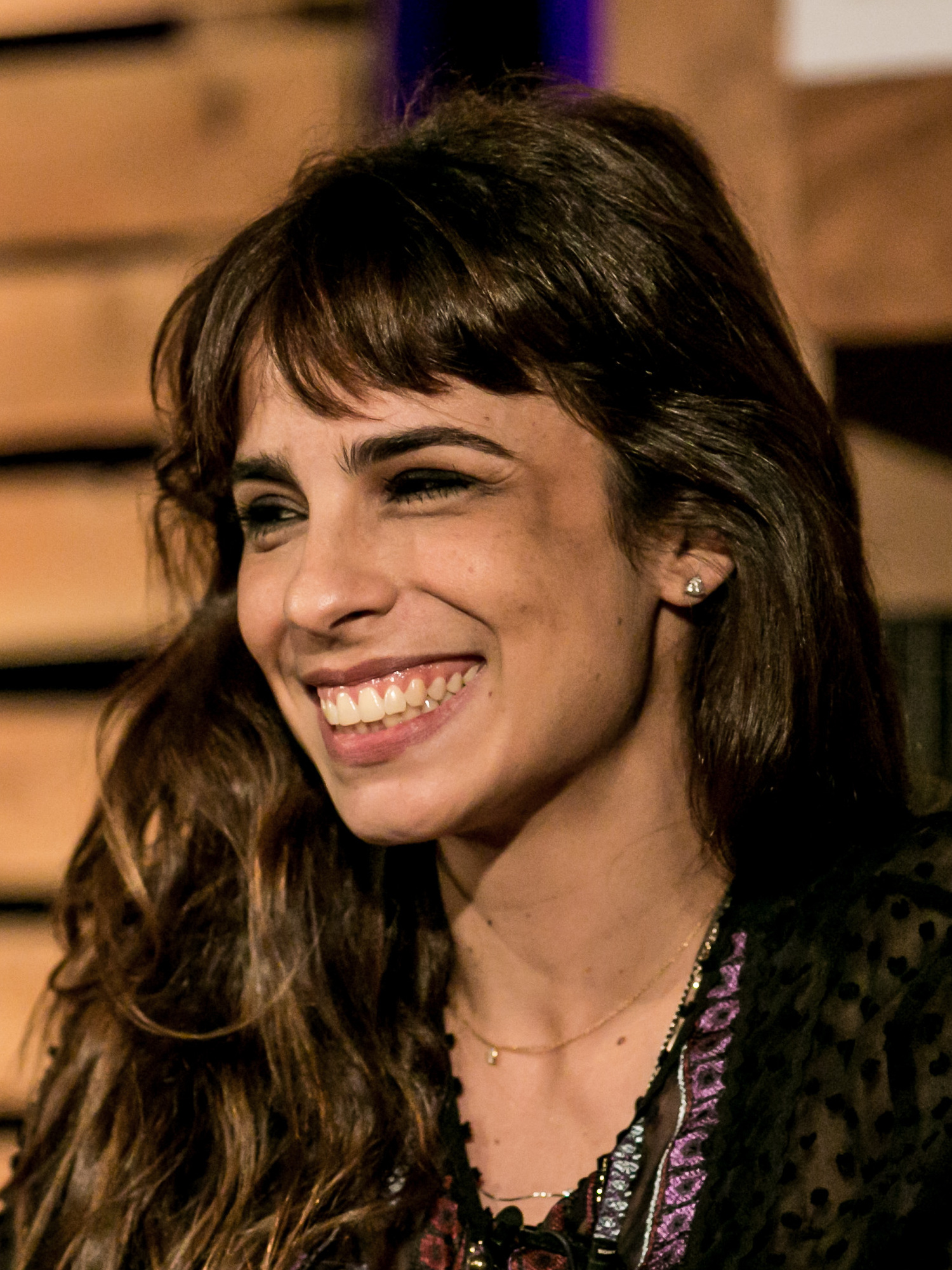
- Ribeiro in 2016
- Born: Maria do Amaral Ribeiro; 9 November 1975 (age 50); Rio de Janeiro, Brazil
- Occupations: Actress, screenwriter, director
- Years active: 1993–present
- Spouses: Paulo Betti (m. 2001; div. 2005) Caio Blat (m. 2007; div. 2020)
- Children: 2

Maria do Amaral Ribeiro (born 9 November 1975) is a Brazilian actress, screenwriter and film director.

== Biography ==
She worked in soap operas such as A Escrava Isaura, playing the beautiful Malvina, and also Luz do Sol, playing Zoé. She also had a part in the film Tolerância, directed by the gaúcho Carlos Gerbase, playing the young Anamaria.

In 2014, she returned to Globo, in the 9pm soap opera Empire. The following year, she released her first book titled Twenty-Eight and a Half, bringing together "chronicles, reflections and venting" with autobiographical texts.

== Personal life ==
She had a son with ex-husband Paulo Betti, João, born in 2003. She was married to the actor Caio Blat, a union that brought her second son, Bento, born in 2010. In 2015, the couple separated, but soon after reunited. In 2017, the ten-year marriage came to an end.

She has stated that she is bisexual.

She is a third cousin of rock singer Dinho Ouro Preto, lead singer of the band Capital Inicial.

== Career ==
=== In television ===
Year	Title	Role	Notes
1994	Memorial de Maria Moura		Special participation
1994	Incidente em Antares	Gessy	Special participation
1995	História de Amor	Bianca Moretti	
1996	Malhação	Denise	Season 2; special participation
1996	Você Decide		Episode: "Tempo de Namoro"
1996	O Rei do Gado	Maria	Special participation
1997	Você Decide	Renata	Episode: "Delicadeza"
1999	Mulher		Special participation
2000	Você Decide		Episode: "A Poderosa"
2000	Você Decide	Débora	Episode: "O Poderoso"
2001	A Padroeira	Rosa Maria	
2004	Metamorphoses	Patrícia	
2004	A Escrava Isaura	Malvina	
2005	Prova de Amor	Raquel Miranda	
2007	Luz do Sol	Zoé Bacelar	
2009	Poder Paralelo	Marilia de Castro	
2011	Oscar Freire 279	Rita	
2012	Rei Davi	Michal	
2013	Copa Hotel	Maria Bartolomeu	
2013	Saia Justa	Presenter	2013–2016
2014	Império	Danielle de Medeiros	
2018	The Mechanism	Andrea Mariano	Episode: "O Último Respiro"
2020	Todas as Mulheres do Mundo	Renata	
2020	Unsoul	Giovana Skavronski	2020–2022
2021	Verdades Secretas II	Herself	Episode: "22"
2022	Mulheres Fantásticas	Narrator	Episode:"Simone de Beauvoir"
2026	Quem Ama Cuida	Beatriz "Bia"	

=== In films ===
Year	Title	Role	Notes
1999	Orfeu	Joana	
2000	Os Idiotas Mesmo		Short film
2000	Tolerance	Anamaria	
2001	O Xangô de Baker Street	Glória	
2002	Separações	Júlia	
2003	Km 0	Ela	Short film
2003	Vinte e Cinco		Short film
2005	Carreiras		
2007	Tropa de Elite	Rosane	
2009	Ouro Negro - A Saga do Petróleo Brasileiro	Camila Camargo Mattos	
2010	Histórias de Amor Duram Apenas 90 Minutos	Júlia	
2010	Não Se Pode Viver sem Amor	Malu	
2010	Tropa de Elite 2	Rosane	
2013	Entre Nós	Silvana	
2016	Barata Ribeiro, 716	Natielle	
2017	Just Like Our Parents	Rosa	
