= Sophie Charlotte (actress) =

Brazilian actress (born 1989)

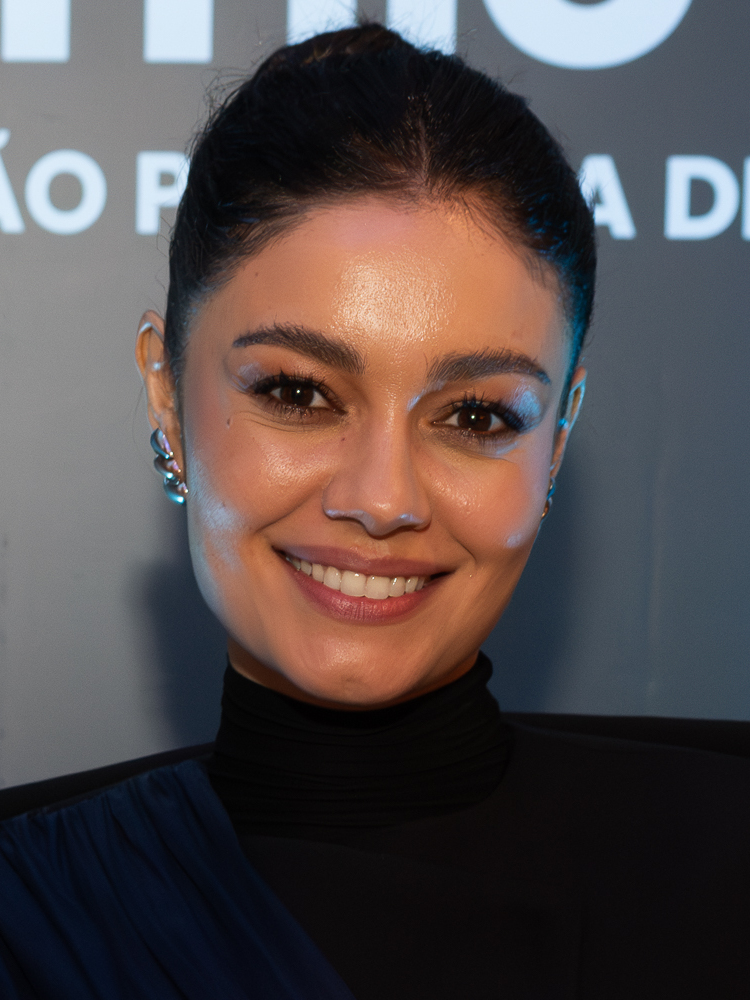
- Charlotte in 2024
- Born: Sophie Charlotte Wolf da Silva; 29 April 1989 (age 37); Hamburg, West Germany
- Occupation: Actress
- Years active: 2004–present
- Spouse: Daniel de Oliveira (m. 2015; div. 2024)
- Children: 1

Sophie Charlotte Wolf da Silva (Portuguese: [soˈfii ʃaʁˈlɔtʃi]; born 29 April 1989) is a Brazilian actress, singer, and ballerina.

== Early life ==
Sophie was born in Hamburg, Germany. She is the daughter of a German mother and a Brazilian father, born in the state of Pará. She left her parents' house in Niterói to live in Rio de Janeiro with her friend actress Carolinie Figueiredo, with whom she shared an apartment.

== Career ==
In the telenovela Caras & Bocas by Walcyr Carrasco she played Vanessa. She played the role of an antagonist in the telenovela Ti Ti Ti. She played Maria Amália, who is the daughter of the protagonist and the sister of her then real life boyfriend Malvino Salvador in the 2011 telenovela Fina Estampa. She's also acted in As Brasileiras (2012); portrayed the protagonist Amora in Sangue Bom (2013), Ritinha in Doce de Mãe (2014), Duda in O Rebu (2014) and Alice in Babilônia (2015). In 2023, she appeared as Magdala, the girlfriend of the titular character in the David Fincher-directed The Killer (2023).

== Personal life ==
In May 2014 she began dating Daniel Oliveira. They married on December 6, 2015 in Niterói. She gave birth to their first son, Otto Charlotte Wolf de Oliveira, on March 14, 2016.

== Filmography ==
=== Television ===
Year	Title	Role	Notes
2004	Malhação	Student	Minor role
2005	Malhação	Azaléia	Guest star
2006	Sítio do Picapau Amarelo	Cinderella	Guest star
2006	Páginas da Vida	Joyce	Guest star
2007–2009	Malhação	Angelina Maciel	Lead role
2009	Caras & Bocas	Vanessa Barros Ferreira "Vanessinha"	Co-star
2010	Ti Ti Ti	Stéfany Oliveira	Antagonist
2011	Looks & Essence	Maria Amália da Silva Pereira	Co-star
2012	The Brazilians - The Women	Esplendor	Episode: "A Sambista da BR-116"
2013	Tangled Hearts	Amora Campana	Antagonist
2014	Serra Pelada: A Saga do Ouro	Tereza	
2014	Sweet Mother	Ritinha	Guest role
2014	O Rebu	Maria Eduarda Mahler "Duda"	Lead role
2015	Babilônia	Alice Junqueira Rangel	Lead role
2017	Os Dias Eram Assim	Alice Sampaio Pereira	Lead role
2018–2019	Ilha de Ferro	Leona Domingues	
2020	Todas as Mulheres do Mundo	Maria Alice	
2021	Passport to Freedom	Aracy de Carvalho	Lead role
2022–2023	All the Flowers	Maíra Valente da Cruz	Lead role
2024	Rebirth	Eliana Vieira	
2025	Three Graces	Gerluce Maria das Graças	Lead role

=== Film ===
Year	Title	Role
2013	Serra Pelada	Thereza
2016	Reza a Lenda	Severina
2016	Barata Ribeiro, 716	Gilda
2016	Tamo Junto	Júlia
2023	O Rio do Desejo	Anaíra
2023	Meu nome é Gal	Gal Costa
2023	The Killer	Magdala
2025	Virgínia e Adelaide	Adelaide Koch

=== Music videos ===
Year	Song	Artist
2017	Respeita	Ana Cañas
2018	Maria, Maria	Milton Nascimento

== Stage ==
Year	Play	Role
2008	O Apocalipse	God's Assistant
2009	Confissões de Adolescente	Sophie

== Discography ==
=== Soundtrack ===
Year	Title	Other(s) artist(s)	Album
2017	"Aos Nossos Filhos"	Gabriel Leone, Daniel de Oliveira, Renato Góes and Maria Casadevall	Os Dias Eram Assim: Trilha Sonora
2020	"Carinhoso"	Emilio Dantas	Todas as Mulheres do Mundo: Trilha Sonora
2022	"As Rosas Não Falam"	Letícia Colin	Todas as Flores: Trilha Sonora
2025	"Antes de Carnavalizar"	Matheus VK	Coragem é Coisa Rara

== Awards and nominations ==
Year	Ceremony	Category	Nominated work	Result
2008	Melhores do UOL e PopTevê	Newcomer Actress	Malhação	Nominated
2009	Prêmio Contigo! de TV	Best New Actress	Malhação	Nominated
2011	Sociedade Brasileira de Odontologia Estética	Smile of The Year	Fina Estampa	Won
2011	Prêmio Quem de Televisão	Best Supporting Actress	Fina Estampa	Nominated
2012	Prêmio Contigo! de TV	Best Supporting Actress	Fina Estampa	Nominated
2012	Meus Prêmios Nick	Gata do Ano	Fina Estampa	Nominated
2013	Rio de Janeiro International Film Festival	Best Actress	Serra Pelada	Nominated
2013	Prêmio Extra de Televisão	Best Actress	Sangue Bom	Nominated
2013	Capricho Awards	Best National Actress	Sangue Bom	Nominated
2013	Restrospectiva UOL	Best Villain (as Amora)	Sangue Bom	Nominated
2013	Restrospectiva UOL	Best Couple (with Marco Pigossi)	Sangue Bom	Nominated
2014	Prêmio Quem de Televisão	Best Actress	Sangue Bom	Nominated
2014	Prêmio Contigo! de TV	Best Telenovela Actress	Sangue Bom	Nominated
2014	Grande Prêmio do Cinema Brasileiro	Best Actress	Serra Pelada	Nominated
2014	Prêmio F5	Actress Of The Year (Telenovela)	O Rebu	Nominated
2014	Prêmio Quem de Televisão	Best Actress	O Rebu	Nominated
2014	Melhores do Ano Drops Magazine	Actress (TV Series)	O Rebu	Won
2014	Jornal Diário Gaucho	Interpretação surpreendente	O Rebu	Won
2014	Jornal Diário Gaucho	Couple of The Year (with Daniel de Oliveira)	O Rebu	Won
2014	Prêmio TV Foco	Best Actress	O Rebu	Nominated
2015	Prêmio Contigo! de TV	Best Telenovela Actress	O Rebu	Nominated
2015	Meus Prêmios Nick	Gata do Ano	Babilônia	Nominated
2016	Prêmio Canal Entreter	Best Cinema Actress	Reza a Lenda	Won
2017	Grande Prêmio do Cinema Brasileiro	Best Actress	Reza a Lenda	Nominated
2017	Grande Prêmio do Cinema Brasileiro	Best Supporting Actress	Barata Ribeiro, 716	Nominated
2017	Prêmio Jovem Brasileiro	Best Young Actress	Os Dias Eram Assim	Nominated
2017	Melhores do Ano	Best Miniseries/Series Actress	Os Dias Eram Assim	Nominated
2017	Prêmio Contigo! Online	Best TV Series Actress	Os Dias Eram Assim	Nominated
2017	Prêmio F5	Best Miniseries or Series Actress	Os Dias Eram Assim	Nominated
2017	Melhores do Ano Minha Novela	Best Couple (with Renato Góes)	Os Dias Eram Assim	Nominated
2018	Troféu Internet	Best Actress	Os Dias Eram Assim	Nominated
2018	Prêmio Extra de Televisão	Telenovela Theme	Os Dias Eram Assim	Nominated
2020	SEC Awards	Best National Actress	Todas as Mulheres do Mundo	Nominated
2020	Prêmio The Brazilian Critic	Best Supporting Actress in a Comedy Series	Todas as Mulheres do Mundo	Nominated
2020	Festival de Gramado	Best Supporting Actress	Um Animal Amarelo	Nominated
2021	Retrô Gshow	Best Meme	Ti Ti Ti	Nominated
2022	Retrô Gshow	Telenovela Scene	Todas as Flores	Nominated
2022	APCA Television Award	Best Actress	Todas as Flores	Nominated
2023	IBest Award	Protagonist Influencer	Todas as Flores	Nominated
2023	SEC Awards	Best National Actress	Todas as Flores	Nominated
2023	Troféu AIB de Imprensa	Best Actress	Todas as Flores	Won
2023	Prêmio Noticiasdetv.com	Best Protagonist Actress	Todas as Flores	Nominated
2023	Acervo Awards	Actress of The Year	Todas as Flores	Nominated
2023	Prêmio ArteBlitz de Novela	Best Protagonist Actress	Todas as Flores	Nominated
2023	Prêmio Área VIP	Best Character	Todas as Flores	Nominated
2023	APCA Television Award	Best Actress	Todas as Flores	Won
2023	Festival Internacional de Cinema de Punta del Este	Best Actress (special recognition)	O Rio do Desejo	Won
2023	Los Angeles Brazilian Film Festival	Best Actress (special recognition)	Meu Nome é Gal and O Rio do Desejo	Won
2023	Splash Awards	Best Performance In a National Film	Meu Nome É Gal	Won
2023	Veja - Retrospectiva do Ano da Coluna GENTE	Actress of The Year	Todas as Flores and Meu Nome É Gal	Won
2024	Festival Sesc Melhores Filmes	Best National Actress	O Rio do Desejo	Nominated
2024	Festival Sesc Melhores Filmes	Best National Actress	Meu Nome É Gal	Nominated
2024	Brazilian Film Festival of Miami	Special Jury Prize	Meu Nome É Gal	Won
2024	IBest Award	Protagonist Influencer	Renascer	Nominated
2024	Prêmio Gshow	Best Couple (with Xamã)	Renascer	Nominated
2024	Prêmio Noticiasdetv.com	Best Antagonist Actress	Renascer	Won
2024	Melhores do Ano Natelinha	Best Actress	Renascer	Nominated
2024	Prêmio F5	Sexiest of The Year	Renascer	Nominated
2024	Prêmio F5	Best Couple (With Xamã)	Renascer	Nominated
2024	Melhores do Ano - Duh Secco	Best Actress	Renascer	Nominated
2025	Troféu Imprensa	Best Actress	Renascer	Pending

Sophie Charlotte was nominated for the 11th Contigo Award in category "Best Female Newcomer Award" for her work as Angelina in Malhação.
