= Adriano Garib =

Brazilian actor (born 1965)

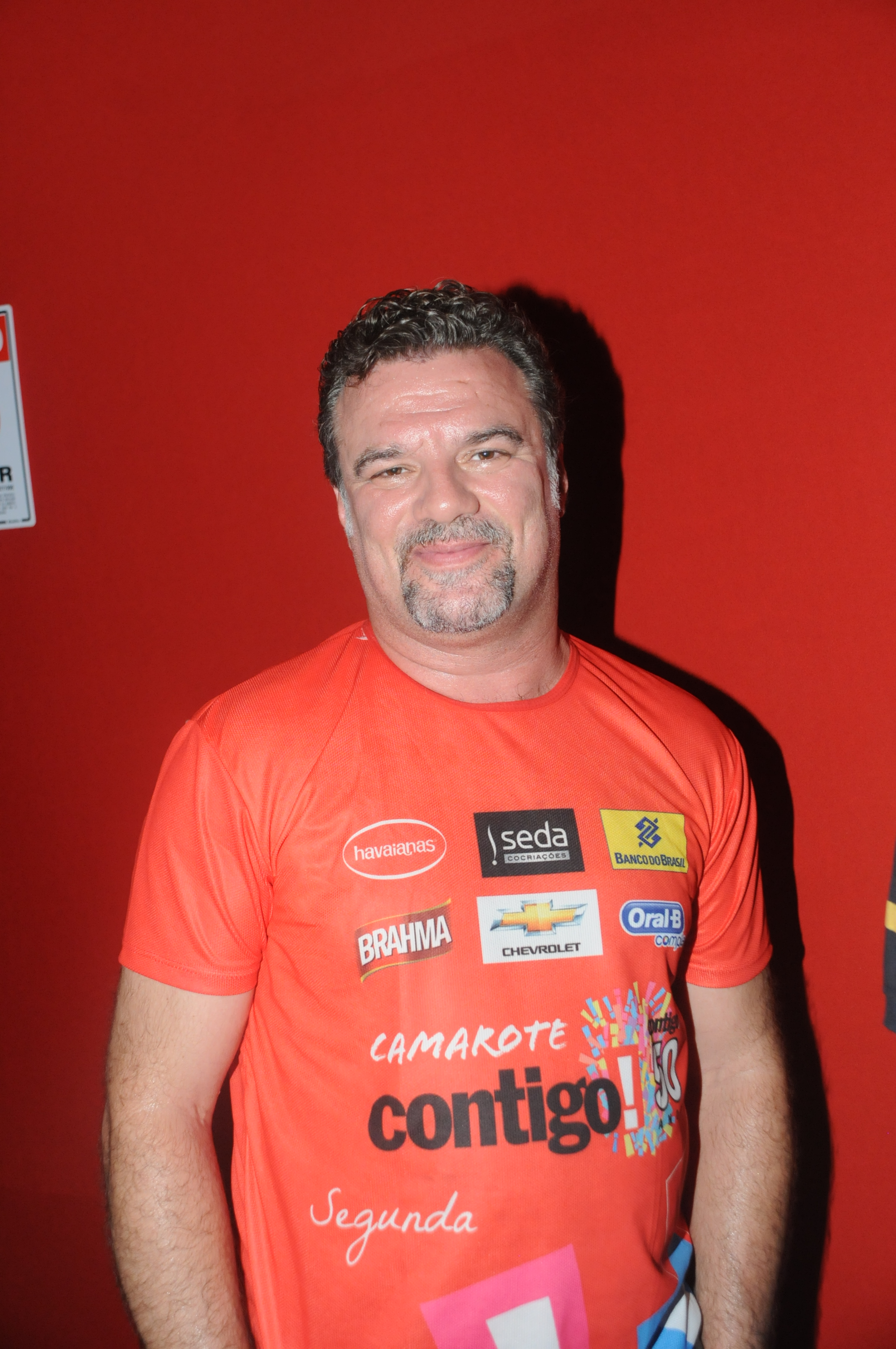
- Garib in 2013
- Born: 31 January 1965 (age 60); Gália, São Paulo, Brazil
- Occupation(s): Actor, journalist, songwriter
- Years active: 1988–present
- Spouse: Analine Barros (m. 2007; div. 2013)

Adriano Garib (born 31 January 1965) is a Brazilian actor, journalist and songwriter.

He is of Syrian-Lebanese descent on his father's side, and of Italian descent on his mother's.

== Selected television ==
- Salsa e Merengue (1996–97)
- A Lua Me Disse (2005)
- Duas Caras (2007–08)
- Insensato Coração (2011)
- Vidas em Jogo (2011–12)
- Salve Jorge (2012–13)
- Magnifica 70 (2015–16)
- 1 Contra Todos (2016)
- Good Morning, Verônica (2020–)
- Rota 66: A Polícia que Mata (2022)

== Selected filmography ==
- Elite Squad: The Enemy Within (2010) - Guaracy
- Getúlio (2014)
