= Rota 66: A Polícia que Mata =

Brazilian television series

- Genre: Drama
- Based on: Rota 66 by Caco Barcellos
- Developed by: Maria Camargo; Teodoro Poppovic
- Directed by: Philippe Barcinski; Diego Martins
- Creative director: Maria Camargo
- Starring: Humberto Carrão; Lara Tremouroux; Aílton Graça; Naruna Costa; Wesley Guimarães; Rômulo Braga; Juan Queiroz; Adriano Garib
- Country of origin: Brazil
- Original language: Portuguese
- No. of seasons: 1
- No. of episodes: 8

Production
- Production company: Boutique Filmes

Original release
- Network: Globoplay
- Release: 22 September – 6 October 2022

Rota 66: A Polícia que Mata (English title: Rota 66: The Killer Unit) is a Brazilian streaming television series based on Caco Barcellos' book of the same name. The series stars Humberto Carrão, Lara Tremouroux, Aílton Graça, Naruna Costa, Wesley Guimarães, Rômulo Braga, Juan Queiroz and Adriano Garib. It premiered on Globoplay on 22 September 2022.

== Premise ==
While investigating the murder of three young men from São Paulo, journalist Caco Barcellos discovers a group of killers operating with the apparent backing of military justice. The more he investigates, the more he discovers innocent victims on the outskirts of São Paulo.

== Cast ==
- Humberto Carrão as Caco Barcellos
- Lara Tremouroux as Luli
- Aílton Graça as Homero Gama
- Naruna Costa as Anabela
- Wesley Guimarães as Tales
- Rômulo Braga as Ramiro
- Juan Queiroz as Sidney
- Adriano Garib as Octávio Ribeiro Malta
- Ana Cecília Costa as Beatriz
- Rômulo Braga as Ramiro
- Felipe Oládéle as José Divino de Oliveira
- Ariclenes Barroso as Lunga
- Magali Biff as Socorro
- Virgínia Rosa as Jacira
- Ricardo Gelli as Moacir Bianco
- Gabriel Godoy as Gilmar de Paula
- Rafael Lozano as Pimenta
- Adriana Lessa as Rute
- Bruno Vinicius as Cosme

== Episodes ==
No.	Title	Original release date
1	"Do Bem E Do Mal"	22 September 2022
2	"Inferno"	22 September 2022
3	"O Futuro Já Começou"	22 September 2022
4	"Tente Outra Vez"	22 September 2022
5	"Cumulus Nimbus"	29 September 2022
6	"Nada Mais Foi Dito"	29 September 2022
7	"Fantasmas"	6 October 2022
8	"O Massacre"	6 October 2022
