= Cássia Kis =

Brazilian actress

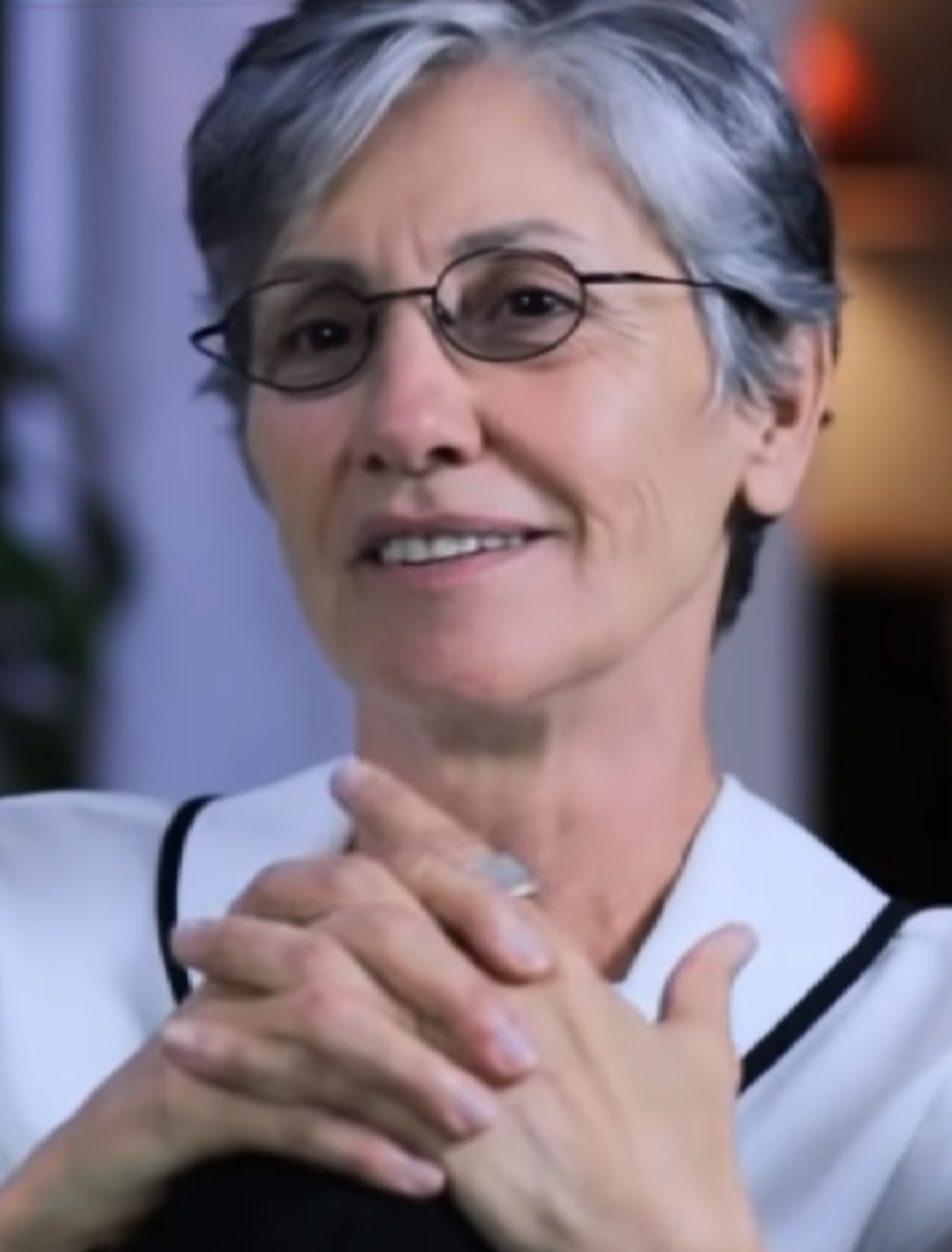
- Kis in 2019
- Born: Cássia Kis; 6 January 1958 (age 68); São Caetano do Sul, São Paulo, Brazil
- Years active: 1979–present
- Spouse: João Baptista Magro Filho (married 2009–2015)
- Children: 6

Cássia Kis (born 6 January 1958) is a Brazilian actress. Formerly known as Cássia Kiss, she included her husband's family name in her stage name between 2010 and 2015 and changed the middle pseudonym from Kiss to Kis (Cássia Kis Magro). Currently, her stage name is Cássia Kis.

== Biography ==
Born in São Caetano do Sul, Brazil. She has Hungarian grandparents. Kis is a vegetarian and used to be a member of the spiritualist community, but in 2021 she became a traditionalist Catholic and a member of Centro Dom Bosco. She now opposes abortion in all cases.

== Career in television ==
=== Telenovelas ===
- 2022 - Travessia as Cidália Bastos
- 2015 - A Regra do Jogo as Djanira
- 2012 - Amor Eterno Amor as Melissa Borges Sobral
- 2011 - Morde & Assopra as Dulce Maria
- 2010 - Escrito nas Estrelas as Francisca
- 2009 - Paraíso as Mariana
- 2007 - Eterna Magia as Zilda
- 2006 - Cobras & Lagartos as Henriqueta / Teresa
- 2002 - Sabor da Paixão as Cecília
- 2001 - Porto dos Milagres as Adma Guerrero
- 2000 - Esplendor as Adelaide
- 1998 - Pecado Capital as Eunice
- 1997 - Por Amor as Isabel
- 1996 - Quem É Você? as Beatriz
- 1993 - Fera Ferida as Ilka Tibiriçá
- 1990 - Barriga de Aluguel as Ana
- 1990 - Pantanal as Maria Marruá (Rede Manchete)
- 1988 - Vale Tudo as Leila
- 1987 - Brega & Chique as Silvana
- 1985 - Roque Santeiro as Lulu
- 1984 - Livre para Voar as Verona

=== TV series / Miniseries ===
- 2006 - JK as Maria
- 2005 - Mad Maria as Amália
- 2004 - Um Só Coração as Guiomar Penteado
- 2015 - Felizes para Sempre? as Olga
- 2016 - Nada Será Como Antes as Odete de Souza
- 2020 - Unsoul (Desalma) as Haia

== Career in the movies ==
- 2009 - A Festa da Menina Morta
- 2008 - Meu Nome Não É Johnny
- 2007 - Chega de Saudade
- 2007 - Não por Acaso
- 2001 - Bicho de Sete Cabeças
- 2001 - Condenado à Liberdade
- 2000 - O Circo das Qualidades Humanas
- 2000 - A Hora Marcada
- 1991 - A Grande Arte
- 1987 - Alta Rotação
- 1987 - Ele, o Boto
- 1987 - O País dos Tenentes
- 1984 - Memórias do Cárcere

== Main prizes ==
- She won the Troféu Passista (Dancer Trophy) of best supporting actor, in the Festival of Recife, for Bicho de sete cabeças (2001).

== Campaigns ==
- In 1989, she appeared in an advertisement for the Ministry of Health about the prevention of the breast cancer.
- In 2006, she was a godmother, in Brazil, of the Worldwide Week of Maternal Breast-Feeding.

== See also ==
- Cimbres Marian apparition, promoted by the actress.
