= Wesley Guimarães =

Brazilian actor

- Born: October 7, 1995 (age 29); Salvador, Bahia, Brazil
- Occupation: Actor
- Years active: 2006–present

Wesley Guimarães (born October 7, 1995) is a Brazilian actor. He is known for playing Isac on the Netflix series Invisible City.

== Career ==
Born in Salvador, Brazil, Wesley found art in 2006 with the volunteer work carried out by Mônica Sansil, and in 2007 he started performing with the "TOPA group" in local parishes, where he first went up on a theater stage. In 2008, Wesley, who increasingly understood himself as an actor, had the opportunity to travel for the sake of art and monetize the activity that contemplated him and record his first feature called Trampolim do Forte, directed by João Rodrigo. In 2012, he returned to the cinemas with João and Vandinha, a film by Aurélio Grimaldi. In 2018, Tungsten was the actor's third film.

In 2019, he played the character Marcel, on the Brazilian Netflix series Brotherhood. In 2021, he played the character Isac in another Netflix series, Invisible City.

== Filmography ==
=== Television ===
Year	Title	Role
2019	Brotherhood	Marcel
2021	Invisible City	Isac/Saci
2022	Rota 66: A Polícia que Mata	Tales

=== Film ===
Year	Title	Role
2010	Trampolim do Forte	Mingo
2012	João e Vandinha	-
2018	Tungsten	Cajú
