= Segunda Chamada =

Brazilian television series

- Genre: Drama
- Created by: Carla Faour; Julia Spadaccini; Jô Bilac
- Based on: Conselho de Classe, by Jô Bilac
- Directed by: Joana Jabace; Pedro Amorim; Henrique Sauer
- Starring: Débora Bloch; Paulo Gorgulho; Hermila Guedes; Silvio Guindane; Thalita Carauta
- Opening theme: "Comportamento Geral" by Elza Soares
- Country of origin: Brazil
- Original language: Portuguese
- No. of seasons: 2
- No. of episodes: 17

Production
- Producer: Isabela Bellenzani
- Production location: São Paulo
- Cinematography: Glauco Firpo; Pedro Sotero
- Editor: Márcio Hashimoto
- Running time: 39–46 minutes
- Production company: O2 Filmes

Original release
- Network: TV Globo (season 1); Globoplay (season 2)
- Release: 8 October 2019 – 10 September 2021

Segunda Chamada (English: Second Call) is a Brazilian television series produced by O2 Filmes. The first season of the series was aired by TV Globo from October 8, 2019 to December 17, 2019, and the second season was released on Globoplay on September 10, 2021. Based on the play Conselho de Classe, by Jô Bilac, it is written by Carla Faour and Julia Spadaccini. It stars Débora Bloch, Paulo Gorgulho, Hermila Guedes, Silvio Guindane and Thalita Carauta.

== Cast ==
=== Main ===
Actor/actress	Role	Seasons	
Actor/actress	Role	1 (2019)	2 (2021)
Débora Bloch	Profª. Lúcia Marques Rocha		
Paulo Gorgulho	Prof. Jaci Queiroz Araújo		
Hermila Guedes	Profª. Sônia Carrasco		
Silvio Guindane	Prof. Marco André da Silva		
Thalita Carauta	Profª. Eliete Sabá		
Felipe Simas	Maicon Douglas Pereira		
Nanda Costa	Rita Maria de Cássia		
Leonardo Bittencourt	Leonardo Queiróz Araújo (Léo)		
Mariana Nunes	Gislaine Silva de Oliveira		
José Trassi	Gedivan Rocha Lima (Giraia)		
Linn da Quebrada	Natasha Pereira dos Santos		
Teca Pereira	Jurema Souza da Costa		
José Dumont	Sílvio Alves Oliveira		
Vinícius de Oliveira	Pedro Torres Soares		
Sara Antunes	Márcia Torres Soares		
William da Costa	Cleiton Ferrão		
Gabriel Díaz	Javier Gonzáles Barrios		
Rosalva Vanessa	Alejandra Gonzáles Barrios		
Ingrid Gaigher	Aline Feitosa Fernandes		
Georgette Fadel	Valquíria Dias Almeida		
Ariane Souza	Joelma Pinto Barbosa		
Moacyr Franco	Gilson da Silva (Gilsinho)		
Ângelo Antônio	Hélio		
Rui Ricardo Dias			
Flávio Bauraqui			
Jennifer Dias			
Pedro Wagner			

=== Recurring ===
Actor/actress	Role	Seasons	
Actor/actress	Role	1 (2019)	2 (2021)
Marcos Winter	Dr. Alberto Marques Rocha		
Otávio Müller	Carlos Carrasco		
Giulia Benite	Giovana Carrasco		
Eduardo Valenta	Julio Carrasco		
Lígia Cortez	Drª. Luisa		
Caio Blat	Prof. Paulo Moreira		
Artur Volpi	Marcelo Marques Rocha		

=== Guests ===
Actor/actress	Role	Notes
Season 1
Carol Duarte	Solange	Episode 1
Sidney Santiago	Geraldo Ferrão (Gero)	Episode 1
Mariana Nunes	Gislaine Silva de Oliveira	Episode 2
Demick Lopes	Juarez	Episode 2
Marcos de Andrade	Reginaldo	Episode 2
Mariana Nunes	Gislaine Silva de Oliveira	Episode 3
Vanderlei Bernadino	Arlindo	Episode 3
Caio Laranjeira	Caio	Episode 5
Edmilson Cordeiro	Tobias	Episode 5
Arthur Aguiar	Evandro	Episódio 6
Alice Carvalho	Fátima	Episode 7
Rodolfo Mesquita	Inspetor Russo	Episode 7
Andre Luis Patricio	Glauco	Episode 8
Duda Carvalho	Milena	Episode 8
Sidney Santiago	Geraldo Ferrão (Gero)	Episode 9
Vilma Melo	Maria Expedita Bessa da Silva	Episode 10
Vilma Melo	Maria Expedita Bessa da Silva	Episode 11
Julio Silverio	Vitor da Costa	Episode 11
Edmilson Cordeiro	Tobias	Episode 11
Heraldo Firmino	Osmar	Episode 11
Raquel Ferreira	Renata	Episode 11
Elzio Vieira	Wallace Cardoso	Episode 11
Season 2

== Episodes ==
Season	Episodes	Originally released		
Season	Episodes	First released	Last released	Network
1	11	October 8, 2019	December 17, 2019	TV Globo
2	6	September 10, 2021		Globoplay
