= Marighella (film) =

2019 film directed by Wagner Moura

- Theatrical release poster
- Directed by: Wagner Moura
- Screenplay by: Felipe Braga; Wagner Moura
- Based on: Marighella - O Guerrilheiro que Incendiou o Mundo by Mário Magalhães
- Produced by: Andrea Barata Ribeiro; Bel Berlinck; Wagner Moura
- Starring: Seu Jorge; Adriana Esteves; Bruno Gagliasso; Humberto Carrão; Luiz Carlos Vasconcelos
- Cinematography: Adrian Teijido
- Edited by: Lucas Gonzaga
- Release date: February 14, 2019 (Berlin)
- Country: Brazil
- Language: Portuguese

Marighella is a 2019 Brazilian biographical political thriller film directed by Wagner Moura, based on the life of Carlos Marighella, a Brazilian politician, writer, and Marxist–Leninist guerrilla fighter accused of engaging in terrorist acts against the Brazilian military dictatorship. The film was adapted from the biography Marighella - O Guerrilheiro que Incendiou o Mundo (Marighella - The Guerrilla Who Lit the World on Fire), by Mário Magalhães. It is Moura's directorial debut.

Seu Jorge plays Carlos Marighella. The film also features Adriana Esteves, Bruno Gagliasso and Humberto Carrão.

== Cast ==
- Seu Jorge as Carlos Marighella
- Adriana Esteves as Clara Charf
- Bruno Gagliasso as Lúcio
- Luiz Carlos Vasconcelos as Almir
- Humberto Carrão as Humberto
- Jorge Paz as Jorge
- Bella Camero as Bella
- Herson Capri as Jorge Salles
- Henrique Vieira as Frei Henrique
- Ana Paula Bouzas as Maria
- Adanilo as Danilo
- Tuna Dwek as Ieda
- Guilherme Lopes as Crespo
- Rafael Lozano as Rafael
- Charles Paraventi as Bob
- Brian Townes as Wilson Chandler
- Wagner Moura as Interrogator (voice)

== Reception ==
Marighella debuted at the 69th Berlin International Film Festival on February 14, 2019, but did not compete for the Golden Bear Award.

The film received generally positive reviews from critics. As of July 2025, 89% of the nine reviews compiled by Rotten Tomatoes are positive, with an average rating of 7.3/10. The film has also attracted social and political controversies. Stephen Dalton, writing for The Hollywood Reporter, observed that Moura presents Marighella as a martyr for liberal values even though the real Marighella was a self-proclaimed far-left Marxist. Marighella's ethnicity was also debated. He is portrayed as black in the film and played by a black actor. Many critics noted, however, that Marighella was actually mixed-race (his father was an Italian immigrant). Moura responded that "there's no way to discuss any social issue in Brazil without talking about racial issues. For me, Marighella had to be black."

The movie was subject to politicized ratings on IMDb, leading the website to note that "unusual voting activity [had been detected]... An alternate weighting calculation has been applied." In 2022, IMDb offers an aggregate 6.6 (out of 10) ranking. Conservative digital activists low-ranked the film, which was countered by progressive activists and artists aligned with Moura offering high scores; in 2022, 95% of the film's rankings are at the extreme of 1 or 10. This distribution suggests that the majority of evaluations were based on ideology rather than cinematic quality; IMDb removed the activists' "critiques."
