= Encantado's =

Brazilian television series

- Genre: Comedy
- Created by: Renata Andrade; Thais Pontes
- Written by: Renata Andrade; Thais Pontes; Chico Mattoso; Antonio Prata
- Directed by: Déo Cardoso; Naína de Paula
- Starring: Luís Miranda; Vilma Melo; Evelyn Castro; Tony Ramos; Neusa Borges; Dandara Mariana
- Country of origin: Brazil
- Original language: Portuguese
- No. of seasons: 2
- No. of episodes: 23

Production
- Production company: Estúdios Globo

Original release
- Network: Globoplay
- Release: 18 November 2022 – present

Encantado's is a Brazilian streaming television series created by Renata Andrade and Thais Pontes. The series stars Luís Miranda, Vilma Melo, Evelyn Castro, Tony Ramos, Neusa Borges and Dandara Mariana. It premiered on Globoplay on 18 November 2022.

== Plot ==
The series takes place in Encantado, a neighborhood that makes up the Méier region in the suburbs of Rio, where siblings Eraldo (Luís Miranda) and Olímpia (Vilma Melo) inherit a grocery store from their father, who died recently. Eraldo is crazy about samba and Carnival, while Olímpia devotes herself to running the business that guarantees the family's survival. The store is a market during the day and at night, it becomes a rehearsal space for the samba school founded by Eraldo and Olímpia's father.

== Cast ==
=== Main ===
- Luís Miranda as Eraldo Ponza
- Vilma Melo as Olympia Ponza
- Evelyn Castro as Maria Augusta Ponza
- Augusto Madeira as Leozinho
- Digão Ribeiro as FlashBlack
- Dandara Mariana as Pandora
- Dhonata Augusto as Pedro
- Ramille as Melissa Ponza
- Neusa Borges as Tia Ambrosia
- Tony Ramos as Madurão
- Luellem de Castro as Ana Shaula
- João Côrtes as Celso Tadeu
- Dhu Moraes as Marlene Ponza
- Leandro Ramos as Ceroto
- Ludmillah Anjos as Crystal

=== Guest stars ===
- Marcelo Médici as Fiscal Carlos
- Jojo Maronttinni as Gleice
- Luciana Paes as Ana Maria
- Noemia Oliveira as Grávida
- Milton Cunha as himself
- Pretinho da Serrinha as himself

== Episodes ==
| Series | Episodes | Originally released |
|---|---|---|
| 1 | 11 | 18 November 2022 |
| 2 | 12 | 12 March 2024 |

=== Season 1 (2022) ===
| No. overall | No. in season | Title | Original release date |
|---|---|---|---|
| 1 | 1 | "Ô, abre alas!" | 18 November 2022 |
| 2 | 2 | "O fiscal tem sempre razão" | 18 November 2022 |
| 3 | 3 | "Tudo sob controle" | 18 November 2022 |
| 4 | 4 | "Vai ou Vaza?" | 18 November 2022 |
| 5 | 5 | "Acorda, menina!" | 18 November 2022 |
| 6 | 6 | "Alegorias e adereços" | 18 November 2022 |
| 7 | 7 | "Biscoitagem" | 18 November 2022 |
| 8 | 8 | "Harmonia nota zero" | 18 November 2022 |
| 9 | 9 | "Coisinha do pai" | 18 November 2022 |
| 10 | 10 | "Encantado’s e cancelados" | 18 November 2022 |
| 11 | 11 | "Alô, povão, agora é sério!" | 18 November 2022 |

=== Season 2 (2024) ===
| No. overall | No. in season | Title | Original release date |
|---|---|---|---|
| 12 | 1 | "Encantado's 2: o inimigo agora é outro" | 12 March 2024 |
| 13 | 2 | "Delírio Sensual, Arco-Íris De Prazer" | 12 March 2024 |
| 14 | 3 | "Funcionário do mês" | 12 March 2024 |
| 15 | 4 | "Intendente X Broadway - Via Taquara" | 12 March 2024 |
| 16 | 5 | "Feijoiada" | 12 March 2024 |
| 17 | 6 | "Se colar, colou" | 12 March 2024 |
| 18 | 7 | "Um dia, um adeus" | 12 March 2024 |
| 19 | 8 | "Um presente pro ator" | 12 March 2024 |
| 20 | 9 | "Gurufim" | 12 March 2024 |
| 21 | 10 | "Samba totalflex" | 12 March 2024 |
| 22 | 11 | "Você pagou com traição" | 12 March 2024 |
| 23 | 12 | "Axé, meus filhos!" | 12 March 2024 |
