= Todas as Flores =

Brazilian telenovela

- Genre: Telenovela
- Created by: João Emanuel Carneiro
- Written by: Vincent Villari; Eliane Garcia; Daisy Chaves
- Directed by: Carlos Araújo
- Starring: Sophie Charlotte; Regina Casé; Letícia Colin; Mariana Nunes
- Opening theme: "As Rosas Não Falam" by Sophie Charlotte and Letícia Colin
- Country of origin: Brazil
- Original language: Portuguese
- No. of seasons: 1
- No. of episodes: 85

Production
- Producers: Gustavo Rebelo; Betina Paulon
- Production company: Estúdios Globo

Original release
- Network: Globoplay
- Release: 19 October 2022 – 1 June 2023

Todas as Flores (English title: All the Flowers) is a Brazilian telenovela created by João Emanuel Carneiro. It premiered on Globoplay on 19 October 2022, and ended on 1 June 2023. The telenovela stars Sophie Charlotte, Regina Casé, Letícia Colin, and Mariana Nunes.

== Plot ==
Maíra (Sophie Charlotte) lives in the city of Pirenópolis, in Goiás, with her father, Rivaldo (Chico Díaz). Maíra, who is blind, grew up believing that her mother was dead, a lie that her father told to protect her because Maíra's mother rejected her at birth due to her visual impairment. One day, Maíra witnesses her father arguing with Zoé (Regina Casé), her mother, whose reappearance has a reason. During the argument, Rivaldo has a heart attack and dies. Zoé, who has a criminal history, tells Maíra a different version of why she disappeared, that Rivaldo ran away with her when she was still a little girl, preventing the two from having a relationship.

Without anyone, Maíra accepts her mother's proposal to move to Rio de Janeiro with her. When Maíra arrives in the city, she meets her sister, Vanessa (Letícia Colin), who needs a bone marrow transplant to treat her leukemia. Zoé explains the situation to Maíra, and she offers herself for Vanessa's procedure. In Rio, Maíra is reunited with Judite (Mariana Nunes), her godmother, who warns her about how dangerous Zoé can be. The relationship between Maíra and Vanessa becomes more complicated because of Rafael (Humberto Carrão), Vanessa's fiancé who falls in love with Maíra, and Pablo (Caio Castro), Vanessa's lover and partner in her scams.

== Cast ==
- Sophie Charlotte as Maíra da Cruz Valente
- Regina Casé as Zoé da Cruz
- Letícia Colin as Vanessa da Cruz Valente
- Mariana Nunes as Judite Xavier
- Humberto Carrão as Rafael Martinez Barreto
- Caio Castro as Pablo Xavier
- Nicolas Prattes as Diego da Silva
- Cássio Gabus Mendes as Luís Felipe Martinez
- Naruna Costa as Lila Martinez
- Ângelo Antônio as Samsa Mondego
- Bárbara Reis as Débora Mondego
- Douglas Silva as Oberdan Nascimento
- Mary Sheila as Jussara Nascimento
- Luís Navarro as Mark
- Leonardo Lima Carvalho as Celinho Nascimento
- Suzy Rêgo as Patsy Martínez
- Zezeh Barbosa as Darcy Munhoz
- Micheli Machado as Chininha Munhoz
- Jhona Burjack as Javé
- Yara Charry as Joy Martinez
- André Loddi as Olavo Kreusinger
- Duda Batsow as Jéssica da Silva
- Samantha Jones as Ciça
- Adriana Seiffert as Garcia
- Mumuzinho as José Carlos Nonato "Joca"
- Xande de Pilares as Darci
- Heloisa Honein as Brenda Munhoz
- Camila Alves as Gabriela
- Moira Braga as Fafá
- Cleber Tolini as Márcio
- Amanda Mittz as Laura
- Luiz Fortes as Rominho
- Rodrigo Vidal as Biel da Silva
- Kelzy Ecard as Deca da Silva "Dequinha"
- Jackson Antunes as Galo
- Fábio Assunção as Humberto Albuquerque
- Thalita Carauta as Mauritânia Munhoz
- Gabriel Lima as Xande
- Bernardo Gomes as Guga
- Pietro Cheuen as Gui
- Giovana Pedrosa as Tina

=== Guest stars ===
- Valentina Bandeira as Dira
- Nilton Bicudo as Raul "Raulzito" Martínez
- Chico Díaz as Rivaldo Valente
- Ana Beatriz Nogueira as Guiomar Martínez Barreto
- Bruno Ibañez as Mendonça
- Gabriel Cardoso as Léo
- Henry Dutra as Nado
- André Pimentel as Deputy
- Murilo Sampaio as Dr. Fred
- Henrique Fraga as Thomás

== Production ==
=== Development ===
In 2019, the series was approved by TV Globo, with the working title being Olho por Olho, and initially scheduled to replace Um Lugar ao Sol in the 9pm time-slot. Due to constant delays caused by the health crisis of COVID-19, the director of dramaturgy at the network underwent a change, but the soap opera was still scheduled to premiere on broadcast TV in the second half of 2022, replacing Pantanal. In March 2022, it was announced that the telenovela would premiere on Globo's streaming service Globoplay, with a reduction from 179 to 85 episodes. On 30 May 2022, Todas as Flores was announced as the official title of the telenovela. Filming began in July 2022.

== Release ==
Todas as Flores premiered on Globoplay 19 October 2022, and was split in two parts. The first part consists of 45 episodes, with 5 episodes being released weekly until 16 December 2022, and a second part of 40 episodes being released weekly from April to June 2023. Vix acquired the exclusive international broadcast rights to Todas as Flores, making the series available as an original series to its platform.

It aired on TV Globo from 4 September 2023 to 20 November 2023, in an edited version of 55 episodes containing both seasons in a single broadcast.

== Soundtrack ==
The following songs make up the soundtrack of Todas as Flores:

- "As Rosas Não Falam" – Sophie Charlotte & Letícia Colin
- "Natural Blues" – Moby
- "Girls Just Want to Have Fun" – STRFKR
- "Pra Gente Acordar" – Gilsons
- "Que Tal um Samba?" – Chico Buarque
- "Vortex" – Nick Cave & The Bad Seeds
- "Um Girassol da Cor do Seu Cabelo" – Silva
- "Todas as Flores" — Tiago Iorc
- "Skylight" – Gabrielle Aplin
- "Não Quero" – Agnes Nunes
- "Face in the Crowd" – Cat's Eyes
- "Blá Blá Blá" – Elza Soares
- "Movimento" – Konai
- "Dirt in My Eyes" – Cold War Kids
- "Lips (Remix)" – Silvia Machete
- "A Flor e o Espinho" – Maria Bethânia
- "Timoneiro" – Paulinho da Viola
- "Clareou" – Xande de Pilares
- "Fulminante", Mumuzinho
- "Sem Samba Não Dá" – Caetano Veloso
- "Me Toca" – Marina Sena
- "Sufoco" – Alcione
- "Revelação" – Fafá de Belém
- "Faz Uma Loucura Por Mim" – Malía
- "Grenade" – Grae
- "Something More Than Love" – Lera Lynn
- "Avec Moi" – Froid
- "Animood" – MLNGA CLUB
- "Amor de Verão com Ombrim" - Duda Beat feat. Li Samuet
