= Mariana Nunes =

Brazilian actress (born 1980)

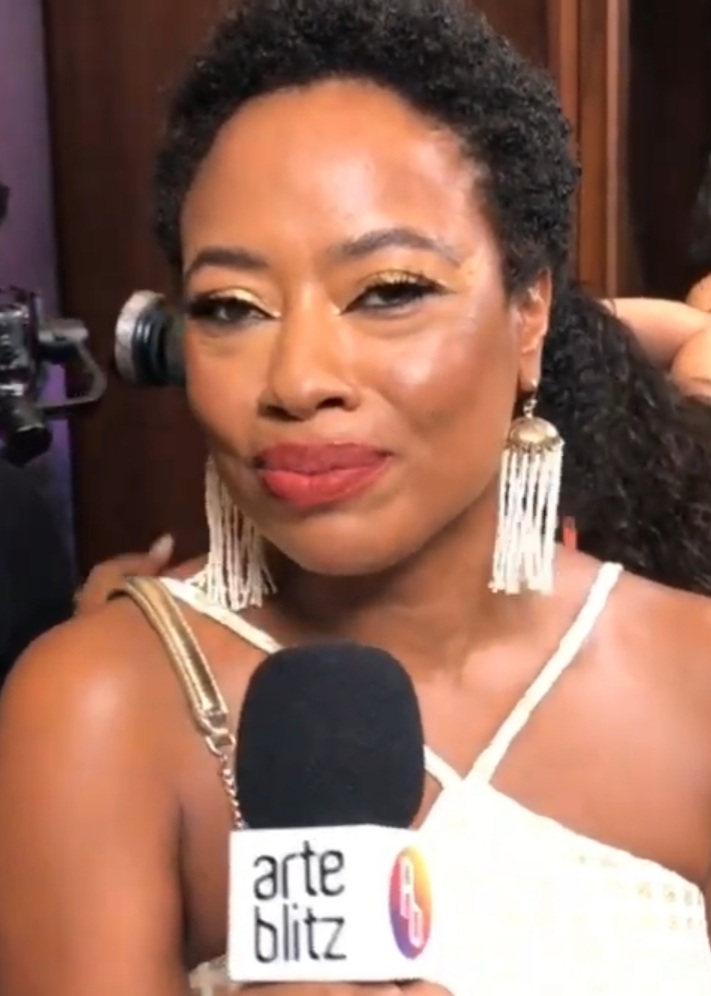
- Mariana Nunes in an interview with the ArteBlitz.
- Born: Mariana de Sousa Nunes; 23 November 1980 (age 44); Brasília, Federal District, Brazil
- Occupation: Actress
- Years active: 2003–present

Mariana de Sousa Nunes (born 23 November 1980) is a Brazilian actress.

== Filmography ==
=== Television ===
Year	Title	Role
2003	Mulheres Apaixonadas	Francis Ribeira
2010	A Cura	Mucama
2012	O Brado Retumbante	Reporter (participation)
2012	A Menina Sem Qualidades	Sofia
2014	Motel	Patrícia
2014	Dupla Identidade	Dina
2016	Alemão – Lados do Complexo	Mariana
2016	Liberdade, Liberdade	Blandina
2019	Amor de Mãe	Rita
2021	Quanto Mais Vida, Melhor!	Dr. Joana Valadares
2022	Todas as Flores	Judite Mourão

=== Film ===
Year	Title	Role
2009	O Homem Mau Dorme Bem	Raquel
2011	Febre do Rato	Rosângela
2012	Trinta	Isabel
2013	Alemão	Mariana
2014	Blaxploitation: A Rainha Negra	Eva Brown
2013	Pelé: Birth of a Legend	Celeste Arantes
2014	O Outro Lado do Paraíso	
2014	Maresia	Maria

== Awards ==
Year	Award	Category	Work	Result
2009	Festival do Recife	Atriz Coadjuvante	O Homem Mau Dorme Bem	Won
2012	Festival Iberoamericano de Cinema de Sergipe	Melhor Atriz	Febre do Rato	Won
2013	III Anápolis Festival de Cinema	Atriz Coadjuvante	O Homem Mau Dorme Bem	Won
2014	Festival de Audiovisual de Belém	Melhor Atriz	Blaxploitation: A Rainha Negra	Won
2016	14ª Mostra ABD Cine Goiás – 18º FICA	Melhor Atriz	Blaxploitation: A Rainha Negra	Won
