= Unsoul =

Brazilian supernatural thriller web television series directed by Douglas Petrie

- Portuguese: Desalma
- Genre: Drama; Supernatural
- Created by: Ana Paula Maia
- Written by: Ana Paula Maia
- Directed by: Carlos Manga Jr.; João Paulo Jabur; Pablo Müller
- Starring: Cássia Kis; Cláudia Abreu; Maria Ribeiro; Anna Melo
- Theme music composer: Alexandre de Faria
- Composer: Alexandre de Faria
- Country of origin: Brazil
- Original languages: Portuguese; Ukrainian
- No. of seasons: 2
- No. of episodes: 20

Production
- Producer: Bárbara Monteiro
- Production location: Rio Grande do Sul
- Cinematography: Lito Mendes da Rocha
- Editor: Arthur Brito
- Camera setup: Single-camera
- Running time: 39–46 minutes
- Production company: Estúdios Globo

Original release
- Network: Globoplay
- Release: 21 October 2020 – 28 April 2022

Unsoul (Brazilian Portuguese: Desalma) is a Brazilian supernatural drama web television series, written by Ana Paula Maia, and broadcast by Globoplay since October 21, 2020.

The series was shown at the Berlin International Film Festival, where it was acclaimed for its history and photography by viewers and various film experts.

The Brazilian production will be shown internationally through distribution by Sony Pictures Television in one of the partnerships with Grupo Globo.

== Plot ==
The story begins with the disappearance of the young Halyna (Anna Melo) in 1988, in the fictional city of Brígida (Ukrainian: Бріжіда), founded by Ukrainian immigrants in the countryside of Southern Brazil.

At the time of the disappearance, the town celebrated Ivana-Kupala, a feast with pagan origins and linked to fertility rites that was incorporated later into the calendar of Orthodox Christians, and in fact is held at the turn of 6 to 7 July. The tragedy caused the feast to be banned from the city's calendar, and thirty years later, when tradition is resumed, mysterious events happen again.

== Cast ==
=== Main ===
- Cássia Kis as Haia Lachovicz
- Cláudia Abreu as Ignes Skavronski Burko
  - Valentina Ghiorzi as young Ignes
- Maria Ribeiro as Giovana Skavronski
- Anna Melo as Halyna Lachovicz
- Bruce Gomlevsky as Ivan Burko
  - Giovanni Gallo as young Ivan
- Ismael Caneppele as Bóris Burko
  - Lucas Soares as young Bóris
- Camila Botelho as Melissa Skavronski
- Giovanni de Lorenzi as Maksym Burko
- Nathália Falcão as Iryna Burko
- Isabel Teixeira as Anele
  - Giovanna Figueiredo as young Anele
- Gabriel Muglia as Pavlo Lachovicz
- João Pedro Azevedo as Anatoli Skavronski Burko
- Juliah Mello as Emily Skavronski

=== Recurring ===
- Luciano Chirolli as Viktor Skavronski
- Henrique Taxman as Olek Skavronski
- Adriana Rabello as Catarina Skavronski
- Susanna Kruger as Mira Skavronski
- Sabrina Greve as Elena Kohut
- Nathália Garcia as Oksana
- Lucas Lentini as Iuri
- Bela Leindecker as Natasha Burloski
- Evandro Soldatelli as Vladimir

=== Guest ===
- Nikolas Antunes as Roman Skavronski
  - Eduardo Borelli as young Roman
- André Frateschi as Aleksey Skavronski
  - Nicolas Vargas as young Aleksey
- Alexandra Richter as Sister Anninka
- Jonas Bloch as Father Andreiv Kozel
- Betina Viany as Sister Benedites Boiko
- Rafael Sieg as Dr. Igor Machula
  - Hall Mendes as young Igor
- Felipe Kannenberg as Polaco (English: "Polish")

== Episodes ==
=== Season 1 (2020) ===
No. overall	No. in season	Title	Directed by	Written by	Original release date
1	1	"Roman" (Portuguese: Roman)	Unknown	Unknown	22 October 2020
After Roman's death, Giovana moves with her daughters to Brígida, where strange facts frighten city dwellers, especially Igles. Haia initiates a witchcraft ritual.
2	2	"Breath" (Portuguese: Fôlego)	Unknown	Unknown	22 October 2020
Haia knows about Ivana Kupala and Anatoli has strange behavior. Flashback reveals Roman and Halyna's romance. Melissa learns about Mavkas.
3	3	"Submerged" (Portuguese: Submersos)	Unknown	Unknown	22 October 2020
Anatoli tells Emily that Roman is present. Flashback shows Aleksey's interest in Halyna. At present, Anatoli hears the same whispers as Haia and she is surprised.
4	4	"Innocent" (Portuguese: Inocentes)	Unknown	Unknown	22 October 2020
Anele tells Ignes a secret. A whisper lures Emily into the forest and Pavlo asks Haia what she has in the basement.
5	5	"Traditions" (Portuguese: Tradições)	Unknown	Unknown	22 October 2020
Anatoli frightens Ignes again. Roman, Aleksey, Boris and Ivan attend the witches' ritual. In the present, Ignes reveals to Giovana that Brígida has a dark side.
6	6	"Revelations" (Portuguese: Revelações)	Unknown	Unknown	22 October 2020
Ignes vented to the psychiatrist. Emily sees her father in Anatoli's reflection in the water. Ignes seeks help from the priest. Iryna gets scared when swimming in the lake and almost drowns. Anele tells Ignes the truth, which confronts Boris.
7	7	"Halyna" (Portuguese: Halyna)	Unknown	Unknown	22 October 2020
Halyna discovers Roman's secret. Halyna slides down the waterfall and hits her head. In the present, Melissa looks in the mirror and sees the image of a girl. Pavlo goes to Haia's basement.
8	8	"Ivana Kupala" (Portuguese: Ivana Kupala)	Unknown	Unknown	22 October 2020
Haia tells Giovana what Roman did in Brígida before he died. Anatoli has the same symptoms as Roman. Boris tells Ivan the truth. At Ivana Kupala, Emily disappears.
9	9	"The Comeback" (Portuguese: O Retorno)	Unknown	Unknown	22 October 2020
The search for Emily mobilizes the community and Anatoli is at risk of life. Roman blackmails Aleksey. Ignes asks the Hague for help in saving his son.
10	10	"Unsoul" (Portuguese: Desalma)	Unknown	Unknown	22 October 2020
Young people find something macabre in the forest. Pavlo overhears Boris and Ivan's conversation. In the search for her sister, Melissa hears whispers and disappears into the forest. Ignes attempts a risky move to save Anatoli's life.

== Production ==
During 30 days, filming for Unsoul took place at the mountainous region of Rio Grande do Sul, with the use of more than 36 sets, 16 of them in an area of 300,000 square meters in the city of São Francisco de Paula.
