= Chick Thing =

2005 Brazilian comedy film

- Theatrical release Poster
- Directed by: Eliana Fonseca
- Written by: Grelo Falante; Eliana Fonseca
- Produced by: Diler Trindade
- Starring: Evandro Mesquita; Adriane Galisteu
- Cinematography: José Guerra
- Edited by: Aruanã Cavalleiro; João Paulo Carvalho; Rodrigo Lima
- Music by: Mu Carvalho
- Production companies: Warner Bros. Pictures; Diler & Associados; SBT Filmes
- Distributed by: Warner Bros. Pictures
- Release date: 2 September 2005
- Running time: 100 minutes
- Country: Brazil
- Language: Portuguese

Chick Thing (Portuguese: Coisa de Mulher) is a 2005 Brazilian comedy film directed by Eliana Fonseca. It was released on September 2, 2005, by Warner Bros. Pictures.

== Cast ==
- Evandro Mesquita as Murilo
- Adriane Galisteu as Mayara
