= Aleta Valente =

Brazilian artist

Aleta Valente (born Gomes Vieira; 1986) is a Brazilian contemporary artist and performance artist who has gained recognition for her photos, videos, and social media persona, particularly through the Instagram profile of character Ex-Miss Febem, created in 2015, who performs audacious and transgressive conduct outside the norms of etiquette imposed on women in society. One of the youngest artists to be profiled in Carla Calirman's 2023 Duke University Press book “Dissident Practices: Brazilian Women Artists, 1960s-2020s,” Valente has gained international visibility for using art as an activist platform for reproductive rights and is regarded as a leader in a new wave of women entering Brazil's art scene by leveraging social media to gain visibility and amplify opportunities for artists from diverse backgrounds. Valente has been nominated for the prestigious PIPA Prize twice, in 2017 and 2019.

== Background ==
Aleta Valente was born in Bangu, a working-class neighborhood in Rio de Janeiro. She adopted the name Aleta Valente from the comic strip Prince Valiant, whose wife was called Aleta.

== Public Controversies ==
Valente's posts through the Ex-Miss Febem persona, sparking controversy for erotic and feminist imagery, led to an Instagram suspension of her account in 2017. Recently, Valente has sparked debate within LGBTQI+ and transgender communities due to her alleged essentialist stance and remarks on gender. Academics Rachel Augusto and Thayná Targa address the Valente's online harassment over transphobia accusations, condemning misleading narratives and accusations and defending the artist in the 2024 book "Transnational Visual Activism for Women's Reproductive Rights: My Body, My Choice."
