= Onde Está Meu Coração =

- Genre: Drama
- Created by: George Moura; Sergio Goldenberg
- Written by: George Moura; Sergio Goldenberg; Laura Rissin; Matheus Souza
- Directed by: Luisa Lima; Noa Bressane
- Starring: Letícia Colin; Daniel de Oliveira; Mariana Lima; Fábio Assunção
- Theme music composer: Monsueto Menezes; Arnaldo Passos
- Opening theme: "Mora na Filosofia" by Letícia Colin & Dany Roland
- Composer: Dany Roland
- Country of origin: Brazil
- Original language: Portuguese
- No. of episodes: 10

Production
- Producers: Luciana Monteiro; Isabel Ribeiro; André Montenegro; Maurício Melo
- Production location: São Paulo
- Cinematography: Henrique Vale
- Editors: Fábio Villela; Flávio Zettel
- Running time: 39–46 minutes
- Production company: Estúdios Globo

Original release
- Network: Globoplay
- Release: 4 May 2021

Onde Está Meu Coração (English: Where My Heart Is) is a Brazilian streaming television series created by George Moura and Sergio Goldenberg for Globoplay. Directed by Luisa Lima and Noa Bressane, and produced by TV Globo’s production division Estúdios Globo, it premiered on the streaming service on 4 May 2021. It stars Letícia Colin, Daniel de Oliveira, Mariana Lima, and Fábio Assunção.

== Premise ==
The series follows Amanda (Letícia Colin), a successful and young doctor from an upper-class family who is carried away by the fleeting pleasure of drugs and can no longer cope with her professional and emotional life. Amanda's family also gets involved when her situation loses control. Faced with the fragility of the family structure, until now unquestionable, everyone must face their personal dramas.

== Cast ==
=== Main ===
- Letícia Colin as Dr. Amanda Vergueiro Meireles
- Daniel de Oliveira as Miguel Freitas
- Fábio Assunção as Dr. David Meireles
- Mariana Lima as Sofia Vergueiro
- Manu Morelli as Júlia Vergueiro Meireles
- Camila Márdila as Vivian Rizo
- Bárbara Colen as Dr. Marta Lima

=== Recurring ===
- Rodrigo García as Beto
- Lola Belli as Child Amanda
- Rodrigo dos Santos as Adriano
- Grace Passô as Dr. Célia
- Ana Flavia Cavalcanti as Inês
- Michel Melamed as Dr. Alexandre
- Cacá Carvalho as Josias
- Bella Camero as Camila
- Antônio Benício as Eugênio
- Alice Camargo as Child Júlia
- Thiago Anderson as David Meireles Filho
