= Letícia Colin =

Brazilian actress and singer

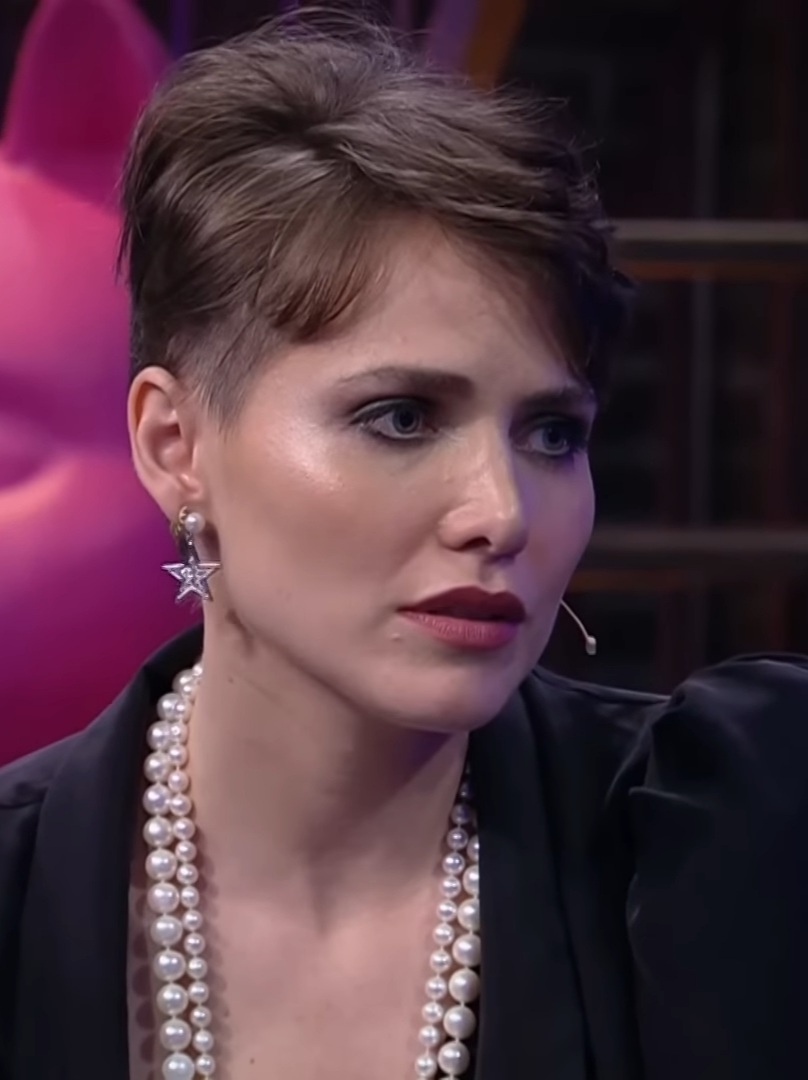
- Colin in 2022
- Born: 30 December 1989 (age 36); Santo André, São Paulo, Brazil
- Occupations: Actress, singer
- Years active: 2000–present
- Partner: Michel Melamed (2015–present)
- Children: 1
- Relatives: Adriana Colin (aunt)

Letícia Helena de Queiroz Colin (Portuguese: [leˈtʃisiɐ koˈlĩ]; born 30 December 1989) is a Brazilian actress and singer. In 2022, she was nominated for the International Emmy Award for Best Actress for her role in the series Onde Está Meu Coração.

== Filmography ==
=== Film ===
Year	Title	Role
2004	Um Show de Verão	Fred's sister
2010	Bonitinha, mas Ordinária	Maria Cecilia
2011	Amor?	Carol
2014	Não Pare na Pista: A Melhor História de Paulo Coelho	Ana
2015	Ponte Aérea	Amanda
2015	Amor em Sampa	Mabel
2016	Um Namorado para Minha Mulher	Mariana
2017	Os Saltimbancos Trapalhões: Rumo a Hollywood	Karina
2017	A Costureira e o Cangaceiro	Lindalva

=== Television ===
Year	Title	Role	Notes
2000–01	Sandy e Junior	Glorinha	Season 1–2
2002	Malhação	Kailani Rodrigues	
2003	TV Globinho	TV presenter	
2004	Histórias de Cama & Mesa	Malu	
2005	Floribella	Marta de Sousa (Martinha)	Season 1–2
2007	Luz do Sol	Heloísa Bacelar (Helô)	
2008	Chamas da Vida	Viviane Galvão Ferreira (Vivi)	
2010	A História de Ester	Ana	
2011	Vidas em Jogo	Juliana Brandão	
2012	Mandrake	Lídia Birman	Episode: "A Investigação"; Episode: "Robin Hood de Copacabana"
2013	Além do Horizonte	Vitória	
2014	Questão de Família	Luciana	Episode: "Verdades"
2014	Amor Veríssimo	Various characters	Season 1–2
2015	Sete Vidas	Elisa de Moraes Ribeiro	
2015	A Regra do Jogo	Paty	Episodes: "September 1–10"
2016	Chapa Quente	Angélica	Episode: "De Ciumento e Louco Todo Mundo Tem Um Pouco"
2016	Nada Será Como Antes	Julia Azevedo Queiroz	
2017	Novo Mundo	Maria Leopoldina of Austria	
2017	A Vida Secreta dos Casais	Renata	
2018	Segundo Sol	Rosa Câmara	
2018	A Costureira e o Cangaceiro	Lindalva	
2019	Cine Holliúdy	Maria Marylin da Silva (Marylin)	Season 1
2021	Onde Está Meu Coração	Dr Amanda Vergueiro Meireles	
2021	Sessão de Terapia	Manu	Season 5
2021	Nos Tempos do Imperador	Maria Leopoldina of Austria	Episode: "August 9"
2022	The Masked Singer Brasil	Motoqueira	
2022	Todas as Flores	Vanessa da Cruz	
2024	The Others	Raquel	
2024	Garota do Momento	Zélia	
2026	Quem Ama Cuida	Adriana de Moraes Brandão	

== Stage ==
Year	Title	Role
2004	O Diário de Débora	Débora
2004	Adolescente Faz Cada Uma	Various characters
2007	Floribella - O Musical	Marta
2009–10	O Despertar da Primavera	Ilse
2010–11	Hair	Jeanie
2012	O Menino que Vendia Palavras	
2012–13	Como Vencer na Vida Sem Fazer Força	Rosemary Pilkington
2014	O Grande Circo Místico - O Musical	Beatriz
2015	Mas Por Quê??! A História de Elvis	Cecília
2016	O Grande Amor da Minha Vida	Maria Helena

=== Internet ===
Year	Title	Role	Notes
2014	A Lei de Murphy	Joana	Gshow Webseries

=== Participation in video clips ===
Year	Artist	Song
2011	Cícero Lins	"Tempo de Pipa"
2012	Cícero Lins	"Ponto Cego"

== Discography ==
Year	Title
2006	Floribella 2: É pra Você Meu Coração
2010	O Despertar da Primavera (musical)

=== Single ===
Ano	Título
2006	Desde Que Te Vi

== Awards and nominations ==
Year	Award	Category	Work	Result	Ref
2011	APTR Awards	Best Supporting Actress	Hair	Nominated	
2017	Melhores do Ano	Best Actress in a Telenovela	Novo Mundo	Nominated	
2018	Melhores do Ano	Best Supporting Actress	Segundo Sol	Won	
2019	Melhores do Ano	Best Actress in a Series, Miniseries or Series	Cine Holliúdy	Nominated	
2021	Melhores do Ano	Best Actress in a Series, Miniseries or Series	Onde Está Meu Coração	Nominated	
2021	APCA Awards	Best Actress	Onde Está Meu Coração	Won	
2022	International Emmy Awards	Best Performance by an Actress	Onde Está Meu Coração	Nominated	
