= Todas as Mulheres do Mundo (TV series) =

Brazilian television series

- Genre: Romantic comedy
- Created by: Jorge Furtado
- Based on: Todas as Mulheres do Mundo by Domingos de Oliveira
- Written by: Janaína Fischer; Jorge Furtado; Domingos de Oliveira
- Directed by: Patricia Pedrosa; Renata Porto; Ricardo Spencer
- Starring: Emilio Dantas; Sophie Charlotte; Martha Nowill; Matheus Nachtergaele
- Theme music composer: Pixinguinha; João de Barro
- Opening theme: "Carinhoso" by Marisa Monte
- Country of origin: Brazil
- Original language: Portuguese
- No. of seasons: 1
- No. of episodes: 12

Production
- Production company: Estúdios Globo

Original release
- Network: Globoplay
- Release: 23 April 2020

Todas as Mulheres do Mundo (English title: All the Women in the World) is a Brazilian television series that was released on Globoplay on 23 April 2020. The series is based on the 1966 film of the same name, written by Domingos de Oliveira. It stars Emilio Dantas, Sophie Charlotte, Martha Nowill, and Matheus Nachtergaele.

== Premise ==
Paulo is an architect who is passionate with freedom, poetry, and women. In search of his great love, he is capable of being enchanted several times and falling deeply to each relationship. Paulo believes that love feeds his soul as a poet and sees the essence of each of the women whom he is involved with.

== Cast ==
- Emilio Dantas as Paulo
- Sophie Charlotte as Maria Alice
- Martha Nowill as Laura
- Matheus Nachtergaele as Cabral

== Episodes ==
No.	Title	Original release date
1	"Maria Alice"	23 April 2020
2	"Adriana"	23 April 2020
3	"Elisa"	23 April 2020
4	"Laura"	23 April 2020
5	"Martinha"	23 April 2020
6	"Dionara"	23 April 2020
7	"Renata e Pâmela"	23 April 2020
8	"Gilda"	23 April 2020
9	"Sara"	23 April 2020
10	"Natália"	23 April 2020
11	"Maria Alice"	23 April 2020
12	"Pink"	23 April 2020

== Awards and nominations ==
Year	Award	Category	Nominated	Result	Ref.
2020	Séries em Cena Awards	Best National Actor	Emilio Dantas	Nominated	
2020	Séries em Cena Awards	Best National Actress	Sophie Charlotte	Nominated	
2020	Prêmio Contigo! de TV	Best Actor in a Series	Emilio Dantas	Nominated	
2020	Prêmio Contigo! de TV	Best Supporting Actor in a Telenovela or Series	Matheus Nachtergaele	Nominated	
2020	Prêmio The Brazilian Critic	Best Actor in a Comedy Series	Emilio Dantas	Nominated	
2020	Prêmio The Brazilian Critic	Best Supporting Actress in a Comedy Series	Sophie Charlotte	Nominated	
2020	Prêmio The Brazilian Critic	Best Supporting Actress in a Comedy Series	Martha Nowill	Nominated	
2020	Prêmio The Brazilian Critic	Best Supporting Actor in a Series	Matheus Nachtergaele	Won	
2020	Melhores do Ano NaTelinha	Best Actor	Emilio Dantas	Nominated	
2020	Prêmio F5	Best Actor in a Drama Series	Emilio Dantas	Nominated	
