= Caco Barcellos =

Brazilian journalist and writer

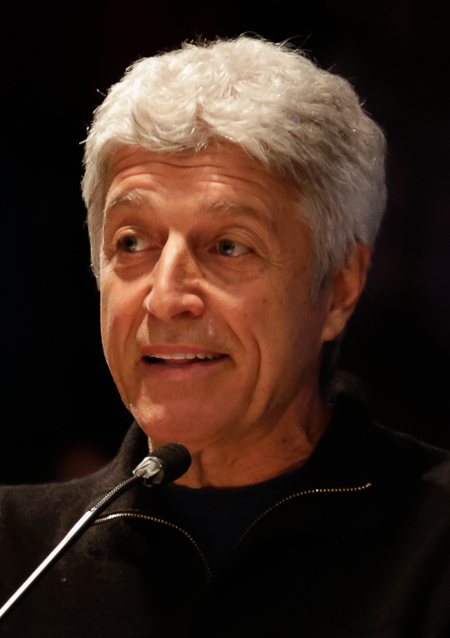
- Born: 5 March 1950 (age 76); Porto Alegre, Brazil
- Occupations: Journalist, reporter and writer

Cláudio Barcellos de Barcellos, known as Caco Barcellos, (born 5 March 1950) is a Brazilian journalist, television reporter and writer, specialized in investigative stories and documentaries about human rights, denouncing social injustice and violence. He presents the program Profissão:Repórter at TV Globo.

Barcellos was awarded two times with Prêmio Jabuti on reporting, with the books Rota 66:a história da polícia que mata (1992) and Abusado: o dono do Morro Dona Marta (2004).

== Biography ==
Barcelos was born in Porto Alegre, in the Vila São José do Murialdo neighborhood. He worked as a taxi driver and graduated in journalism at the Pontifical Catholic University. Barcellos started as a reporter for the Porto Alegre newspaper Folha da Manhã, having also written as a freelancer for the magazines Verus, ISTOÉ and Veja and the newspaper Coojornal, of the Rio Grande Do Sul Journalist's Union. In 1979, Barcellos reported about the Sandinista revolution in Nicaragua; in the book Nicarágua:a revolução das crianças.

In 1982 he was hired by TV Globo, where he currently works.

== Works ==
=== Books ===
- 1979 – Nicarágua: a revolução das crianças.
- 1992 – Rota 66: a história da polícia que mata
- 2004 – Abusado: o dono do Morro Dona Marta

=== Stage play ===
- 2007 – Osama: The Suicide Bomber of Rio (co-written with Célia Helena for the Conexões project)
