= Cassiano Gabus Mendes =

Brazilian writer (1929–1993)

- Born: July 29, 1927; São Paulo, Brazil
- Died: August 18, 1993 (aged 66); São Paulo, Brazil
- Occupations: Telenovela director, author, and producer
- Spouse: Helenita Sanches (1951–1993)
- Children: 2 (Cássio Gabus Mendes and Tato Gabus Mendes)
- Father: Otávio Gabus Mendes
- Relatives: Luis Gustavo (brother-in-law)

Cassiano Gabus Mendes (19 July 1927 – 18 August 1993) was a Brazilian telenovela director, author, and producer. Considered a pioneer of television in his country, he was Latin America's first artistic director for television. Mendes wrote successful telenovelas in the 1970s and 1980s for TV Globo, including Anjo Mau, Locomotivas, Que Rei Sou Eu?, Ti Ti Ti, Brega & Chique, Meu Bem, Meu Mal, and Elas por Elas.

== Biography ==
The son of radio broadcaster Octavio Gabus Mendes, Cassiano grew up spending time in the radio studios where his father worked. At 20, after his father's death, he and his sister, Edite, took on the responsibility of supporting the family.

Cassiano began his career at TV Tupi in 1950, as Latin America's first television artistic director, at the age of 24. At that channel, he was one of the creators of the television play TV de Vanguarda and the series Alô, Doçura!. In 1968, as superintendent of TV Tupi, he had the original idea for the telenovela Beto Rockfeller, which, unlike other telenovelas that portrayed period stories, depicted everyday characters and situations.

In 1976, he moved to TV Globo, where he dedicated himself exclusively to writing telenovelas, making his debut with Anjo Mau. Cassiano became essential to consolidating the 7 p.m. slot as one reserved for romantic comedies aimed at young audiences. Some of his telenovelas were remade in Chile, such as El amor está de moda, and Te Contei? was remade in Mexico under the title Ni contigo ni sin ti in 2011.

Cassiano Gabus Mendes died of a myocardial infarction in 18 August 1993, less than three weeks before the finale of his last telenovela, O Mapa da Mina.

== Filmography ==
=== Telenovelas ===
- O Amor Tem Cara de Mulher (1966)
- Beto Rockfeller (1968)
- Anjo Mau (1976)
- Locomotivas (1977)
- Te Contei? (1978)
- Marron Glacé (1979)
- Plumas e Paetês (1980)
- Elas por Elas (1982)
- Champagne (1983)
- Ti Ti Ti (1985)
- Brega e Chique (1987)
- Que Rei Sou Eu? (1989)
- Meu Bem, Meu Mal (1990)
- O Mapa da Mina (1993)

=== Television series ===
- Alô, Doçura! (1953)
- Mário Fofoca (1983)
