= Ti Ti Ti (2010 TV series) =

- Also known as: Ti-Ti-Ti; The Buzz
- Genre: Telenovela
- Created by: Maria Adelaide Amaral
- Written by: Maria Adelaide Amaral; Vincent Villari
- Directed by: Jorge Fernando; Marcelo Zambelli; Maria de Médicis; Ary Coslov
- Starring: Murilo Benício; Alexandre Borges; Cláudia Raia; Christiane Torloni; Malu Mader; Isis Valverde; Caio Castro
- Opening theme: "Ti Ti Ti" by Rita Lee
- Country of origin: Brazil
- Original language: Portuguese
- No. of episodes: 209 (and 1 pilot); 150 (International version)

Production
- Production locations: São Paulo, Belo Horizonte - Brazil
- Camera setup: Multiple-camera setup
- Running time: 60 minutes

Original release
- Network: TV Globo
- Release: 16 July 2008 – 18 March 2011

Related
- Ti Ti Ti (1985, Brazil); El amor está de moda (Chile, 1995)

Ti Ti Ti (international title: The Buzz) is a Brazilian telenovela that originally aired on TV Globo from 19 July 2010 to 17 March 2011. Based on the 1985 telenovela Ti Ti Ti, written by Cassiano Gabus Mendes, the remake is created and written by Maria Adelaide Amaral. It featured in-universe characters from other Globo telenovelas, such as Plumas e Paetês (1980), Elas por Elas (1982), Locomotivas (1977) and Meu Bem, Meu Mal (1990).

The telenovela was broadcast in Globo's 7 p.m. timeslot. It was the seventy-seventh to be broadcast in this timeslot, and the first of this timeslot to be broadcast in 1080i (HDTV).

The plot has the actors Murilo Benício, Alexandre Borges, Cláudia Raia, Malu Mader, Christiane Torloni, Ísis Valverde, Caio Castro, Fernanda Souza, Dira Paes, Giulia Gam, Sophie Charlotte, Juliana Alves, Mayana Neiva, Maria Helena Chira and Thaila Ayala in the leading roles.

== Plot ==
Alexandre Borges and Murilo Benicio interpret rivals in history, respectively Jacques Leclair and Victor Valentin, who spend the entire novel feuding over who stands in the world as a successful fashion designer, named transformed into designer collections and paraded in major fashion weeks and photographed for celebrity magazines. Their names, however, are not true. Under the flamboyant personality and seductive affected Jacques Leclair hides the fun and kitschy André Spina, a father of four, who works with the segment of dresses for parties. Victor Valentin, in turn, is a figure invented by Ariclenes Martins, Ari, to compete for the spotlight with André.

Born in the same village Belenzinho neighborhood on the east side of São Paulo, and enemies since childhood, André Spina and Ariclenes Martins always played everything: toys, friends and girls. André owns a studio in Tatuapé, which goes by the name of Jacques Leclair, being very prestigious by the region's elite.

Much of his success comes from his irresistible power of seduction, he disguises himself assuming an affected, like gay, not to arouse the jealousy of the husbands of their customers behavior. He began his career next dressmaker Martha (Dira Paes), her neighbor in Belenzinho, who fashioned his first creations and encouraged to invest in party clothes to. Abandoned her when she met Ana Maria, the daughter of a big wholesaler and he had the money he needed to mount his first workshop. Ana Maria had four children: Pedro (Marco Pigossi), Valquíria (Juliana Paiva) and twins Maria Beatriz (Mabi) (Clara Tiezzi), and Luis Felipe (Lipe) (David Lucas). Well off, living in a duplex Garden Analia Franco and the children's aunt, Julia (Nicette Bruno), who created him as a son, André dreams become an elite stylist, and it is in this context that he know Jaqueline (Claudia Raia).

Jacqueline lives in a large apartment in Jardins neighborhood. Elegant and indisputable good taste, lives a broken marriage with Breno (Tato Gabus Mendes), with whom he has a daughter, Thaísa (Fernanda Souza), which is nothing like her mother. At the suggestion of a friend of Thaísa, you need to buy a dress for a party, Jaqueline arrives at the studio of Jacques Leclair and get mesmerized by the seductive way the stylist. Like other clients, she can not resist the charm of Jacques and becomes his mistress.

With its exquisite taste, Jacqueline realizes that the problem of dresses Jacques Leclair is information overload: the clothes are well cut, but there are many sparkles and ruffles. She begins to edit the creations, making small adjustments to the original sketches and turning them into sophisticated pieces dresses, leading the designer to realize you need that woman as his right arm. Furthermore, Jaqueline is the key of the gates of high society that craves Jacques, thanks to its network of social relations. She is a great friend of Stela (Mila Moreira), personal stylist who advises companies and individuals, and has a column in the respected magazine Fashion Brazil. With Jaqueline at her side, the name of Jacques Leclair finally begins to appear.

Passionate designer, Jacqueline decides to separate from Breno and starts a war over family assets. Breno hires private detective Mario Gossip (Luis Gustavo) so that it proves the infidelity of his wife - according to the prenuptial agreement signed by the two, he can drive her home only with the clothes on his case proves that she is unfaithful. Jaqueline leaves sure going to marry Jacques Leclair house, but the designer, who is not in love, gives the lame excuse that their children will not forgive him if he tried to replace their deceased mother.

Jacqueline now lives in the hope of marrying Jacques when the children emancipate themselves, and do not mind helping you to shine in the fashion world. But the stylist, vain, seduces and leaves clients with several of them, always hidden from the jealous Jaqueline. Until Jaqueline hires Clotilde (Juliana Alves) to work in the studio, not realizing that the purpose of the girl of humble appearance is win and marry Jacques Leclair. Passionate, André surrenders to the charms of quirky girl. When Jaqueline discovers the involvement of the two, vows revenge.

Ari, meanwhile, went on to win big money in the lottery. He married his girlfriend, Susan (Malu Mader) - with whom he had a son, Luti (Humberto Carrão) - and was living with his family in the upscale neighborhood of Jardins. Why not learn to manage your money, but lost everything after betting in uncertain business. The marriage ended, since Ari and Suzana found to have incompatible personalities and styles. Suzana devoted to studies, secured his place in the market and rose to head the magazine Fashion Brazil. With the end of fortune Ari, was obliged to support her ex-husband not to harm the child studies, we decided to live with his father. It Suzana who pays the rent of the two. Wise, Luti knew that Ari needed him more than his mother, and chose to help him pay the household bills. The boy is divided between the college of Fine Arts and works as a waiter.

While waiting to be honored again by luck, and sure will do a brilliant idea to recover the fortune he had a day Ari invents projects ever go right, always with help friend Chico (Rodrigo Lopez) of a type messier than he. Until your attention is drawn to an old lady in rags, a homeless who carries a collection of dolls for which creates many dresses. Among his belongings, is a doll that she presents as Victor Valentine, "the most beautiful and courageous prince of Spain." Ari wastes no time and, given the opportunity at hand, houses the lady in a nursing home, provides tissue and stimulates create new and original models. Then, the designer asks son to turn them into sketches.

Ari takes the designs made by Luti for Marta and Nicole (Elizangela) seamstresses, their neighbors in Belenzinho confeccionarem models, and reveals his plan to become a famous Spanish couturier. Marta, who was abandoned by Jacques Leclair in his youth, does not believe that the plan could work, but accept the risk. They summon Desirée (Mayana Neiva), daughter Nicole, to parade the first outfit, a stunning red dress, in a party of Fashion magazine Brazil, before a crowd of photographers and important guests of the fashion world. The dress makes huge success and everyone wants to know the name of the stylist responsible for the design, generating a ti-ti-ti around the identity of Victor Valentine, Ari manages to keep a secret until the final stages of the plot.

Characterized as Valentine, with a costume similar to a matador, Ari is seductive with customers, fueling the myth of false Spanish designer. At one point, Jaqueline, who swore revenge on Jacques, passes to the side of Ari, and then also break up with him and create his own label.

What Ari ignores is that the sweet old lady who sews dresses for dolls, source of its success, is actually Cecilia (Regina Braga), a missing mother of Andrew. When young, she left the child in the care of her sister, Julia, and departed with her new boyfriend. Abandoned and not daring to return home, Cecilia let the guilt consume so that affected his sanity - to the point of not even remember his real name.

The rivalry between Ari and Andrew remains throughout the plot, being tough when your kids, Luti and Valkyrie, fall in love, living a troubled relationship. At one point, Jaqueline, who had turned up nun along the plot, marries the surfer Thales (Armando Babaioff), who owns a construction. Marriage, in fact, is forged, so Thales can redeem his inheritance, by his grandmother retained. The link, in turn, allows Jaqueline Jacques revenge by making him sign a partnership agreement with Thales. At the time of signing the papers, documents and exchange Thales Jacques ends up selling its brand to Thales, losing the autonomy of their business. Jaqueline turns creative director Jacques Leclair brand.

After many exchanges of barbs, jabs, sabotage and ups and downs of both parties, designers end up agreeing to make peace, albeit grudgingly, after the story of Cecilia is discovered. With the care and treatment received at the clinic where Ari left, the mother of Andrew reclaims memory and sanity, and back to the family, demanding a truce between the two.

Ari, who spent the entire novel trying to win back his ex-wife, Susan discovers that Martha is the woman of your life, and ask the seamstress in marriage. Susan finds a new love, the novel writer Fernando Flores (Fábio Assunção). And Andrew continues with Clotilde.

At the end of the plot, Ari, and Jacqueline Jacques, after defeating their respective brands in a fashion contest, join forces, encouraged by Clotilde, and create a society to shine in the fashion world.

== Cast ==
Actor - Actress	Character
Murilo Benício	Ariclenes Martins (Victor Valentim)
Alexandre Borges	André Spina (Jacques Leclair)
Christiane Torloni	Rebeca Bianchi
Malu Mader	Suzana Martins
Ísis Valverde	Marcela de Andrade
Caio Castro	Edgar Sampaio
Sophie Charlotte	Stéfany Olive
Giulia Gam	Bruna Soares Sampaio
Fernanda Souza	Thaísa Maldonado Rodrigues
Guilhermina Guinle	Luísa Salgado
Mônica Martelli	Dorinha Bacelar
Maria Helena Chira	Camila Bianchi
Mayana Neiva	Desirée Oliveira
Humberto Carrão	Luís Otávio Martins (Luti)
Thaila Ayala	Amanda Moura
Tato Gabus Mendes	Breno Rodrigues
Leopoldo Pacheco	Gustavo Sampaio
André Arteche	Júlio Santana
Rodrigo Lopéz	Francisco da Silva (Chico)
Guilherme Winter	Renato Villa
Marco Pigossi	Pedro Luís Spina
Juliana Alves	Clotilde
Rafael Zulu	Adriano Novaes
Alexandre Slaviero	Armando Maragoli (Armandinho)
Mila Moreira	Stela Sanches
Carolina Oliveira	Gabriela Moura
Betty Gofman	Maria do Socorro "Help"
Ricardo Duque	Francis Fiuza
Maria Célia Camargo	Dona Mocinha Maragoli
David Lucas	Luis Felipe Spina (Lipe)
Carolinie	Maria Eduarda (Madu)
Rafael Cardoso	Jorgito Bianchi
Armando Babaioff	Thales
Priscila Camargo	Valdete
Hilda Rebello	Olga
Maria Carol	Lourdes
Yaçanã Martins	Penha
Marcos Tumura	Vicky
Marcelo Barros	Vagner
Júlio Oliveira	Ângelo Moura
Izabella Bicalho	Irina
Christiana Kalache	Graça
Sílvio Pozatto	Toninho
Rosanna Viegas	Rosário
Theodoro Cochrane	Dr. Queiróz
Ana Paula Pedro	Teca
Dorival Carper	Ed Silveira
Thiago Picchi	Helinho
Rômulo Medeiros	Evandro
Lúcia Bronstein	Magali
Felippe Luhan	Fabinho
Viviane Netto	Paula
Fábio Bianchini	Ramiro
Rodrigo Serrano	Alfredão
Cacau Protásio	Fátima
Paula Bicalho	Vivian (Vi)
Bebel Ambrósio	Milena (Mi)
Cris Rebelo	Kátia
Daianny Cristian	Aparecida (Cida)
Rodrigo Cury	Cadu
Tathiane Campos	Priscila (Pri)

Introducing

Actor - Actress	Character
Juliana Paiva	Valquiria Spina (Val)
Clara Tiezzi	Maria Beatriz Spina (Mabi)

Special Appearances

Actor - Actress	Character
Maria Zilda Bethlem	Gigi
Paulo Goulart	Orlando Bianchi
Gustavo Leão	Osmar Soares Sampaio
Marcos Frota	Massa
Daniela Escobar	Daguilene Oliveira (Pâmela)

Guest Actors

Actor	Character
Luís Gustavo	Mário Cury (Mário Fofoca)
Mauro Mendonça	Giancalo Villa

Guest Actresses

Actress	Character
Dira Paes	Marta Moura
Elizângela	Daguijane Oliveira (Nicole)
Regina Braga	Cecília

Actor - Actress	Character
Marco Ricca	Higino Oliveira (Gino)
Nicette Bruno	Júlia Spina
Cláudia Raia	Jaqueline Maldonado

== Reception ==
=== Ratings ===
Timeslot	Episodes	Premiere		Finale		Rank	Season	Average viewership
Timeslot	Episodes	Date	Viewers (in points)	Date	Viewers (in points)	Rank	Season	Average viewership
Mondays—Saturdays; 7:00pm	209	19 July 2010	29	18 March 2011	37	#1	2010-11	29,5

=== International exhibition ===
- Brazil - TV Globo
- Portugal - SIC
- Portugal - RTP Internacional
- El Salvador - TCS Canal 4
- Bolivia - Unitel
- Uruguay - Teledoce
- Dominican Republic - Tele Antillas
- Nicaragua - Televicentro
- Ecuador - Ecuavisa
- Chile - Canal 13
- Argentina - Canal 9 Televida
- Mozambique - STV
- Paraguay - SNT
- Panama - Telemix Internacional

== Crossover with other telenovelas from Rede Globo ==
During the events in Ti Ti Ti, it is revealed that this telenovela is part of a shared universe created by Cassiano Gabus Mendes and because of that several characters who appeared in the telenovelas created by him for Rede Globo make a cameo in this telenovela (either a quick cameo or a recurring and important role). The characters that appear in TiTiTi are (in order of the premiere date of the novels in which they were originally a part):

- Maria Josefina Cabral/Madame Kiki Blanche (played by Eva Todor) from Locomotivas (1977)
- Mário Fofoca (played by Luis Gustavo) from Elas por Elas (1982)
- Rafaela Alvaray (played by Marília Pêra) from Brega & Chique (1987)
- Magda Costa Correia, Divina Magda (portrayed by Vera Zimmermann) from Meu Bem, Meu Mal (1990)

== Other versions ==
- (Brazil) Ti Ti Ti - a Brazilian telenovela produced and aired by TV Globo in 1985.
- (Chile) El amor está de moda - a Chilean telenovela produced and aired by Canal 13 in 1995.

Preceded by Tempos Modernos; 11 January 2010–16 July 2010	Globo 7 p.m. timeslot telenovela 19 July 2010–18 March 2011	Succeeded by Morde & Assopra; 21 March 2011–14 October 2011
