= O Mapa da Mina =

- Genre: Telenovela
- Created by: Cassiano Gabus Mendes
- Starring: Carla Marins; Cássio Gabus Mendes; Malu Mader; Luís Gustavo; Fernanda Montenegro; Mauro Mendonça; Eva Wilma; Maurício Mattar; Maria Padilha; Tato Gabus Mendes; Beth Goulart; Dennis Carvalho; Luíza Brunet; Antônio Grassi; Pedro Paulo Rangel
- Opening theme: "O Rap da Máfia"
- Composer: A Caverna
- Country of origin: Brazil
- Original language: Portuguese
- No. of episodes: 137

Production
- Running time: 50 minutes

Original release
- Network: TV Globo
- Release: 29 March – 3 September 1993

O Mapa da Mina is a Brazilian telenovela produced and aired by TV Globo from 29 March to 3 September 1993, in 137 episodes.

Written by Cassiano Gabus Mendes, with the collaboration of Maria Adelaide Amaral, Gugu Keller, Walkíria Portero and Dejair Cardoso, the telenovela was directed by Roberto Naar and Flávio Colatrello Jr.

Carla Marins, Cássio Gabus Mendes, Luís Gustavo, Mauro Mendonça, Malu Mader, Tato Gabus Mendes and Pedro Paulo Rangel star in the main roles.

== Plot ==
In Uruguay, a gang steals ten million dollars in diamonds. One of the thieves, Rodolfo (Mauro Mendonça), flees to Argentina. Ivo (Paulo José) goes to São Paulo, hiding the product of the robbery, except that he is arrested. Eight years later, when he gets out of jail, he is run over and dies, but before this he still has time to tell his son, Rodrigo (Cássio Gabus Mendes), that he and Ivo had a map tattooed above a girl's buttocks, Elisa (Carla Marins), a map that shows a location of the diamonds, even taking care to photograph the girl. Elisa is a novice and is about to make her perpetual vows.

== Cast ==
- Carla Marins as Elisa Souto
- Cássio Gabus Mendes as Rodrigo Simeone
- Malu Mader as Wanda Machado
- Luís Gustavo as Antônio "Toni" Machado
- Mauro Mendonça as Rodolfo Torres de Almeida
- Eva Wilma as Tatiana Torres de Almeida
- Fernanda Montenegro as Madalena Moraes
- Maurício Mattar as Bakur Shariff
- Tato Gabus Mendes as Raul Gouveia
- Carolina Ferraz as Bruna Torres de Almeida Lovatelli
- Beth Goulart as Tânia Moraes
- Nair Bello as Zilda Machado
- Pedro Paulo Rangel as Joaquim "Joe" Machado
- Gianfrancesco Guarnieri as Vicente Rocha
- Bete Mendes as Carmem Simeone Rocha
- Dennis Carvalho as Erasmo Alcântara
- Maria Padilha as Giovana Alcântara
- Nelson Freitas as Roberto Lovatelli
- Ana Rosa as Antônia Moraes
- Antônio Abujamra as Nero Horácio Koll
- Mila Moreira as Carlota Strega
- Paula Burlamaqui as Neide Gonzaga
- John Herbert as Wagner Amaral
- Suzana Faini as Amélia Borges "Madre Amélia"
- Antônio Grassi as César de Oliveira
- Luíza Brunet as Nadir da Silva
- Gisela Marques as Lygia Amaral
- Marcelo Serrado as Sílvio Azevedo
- Bianca Byington as Laís Azevedo
- Andrea Murucci as Paula Strega
- Cláudio Curi as Pasqualino Stromboli
- Ada Chaseliov as Olga Lopes
- Mariane Vicentini as Cibele Prado
- Luis Maçãs as Bruno Alencar "Bubi"
- Clarice Niskier as Dayse Correia
- Paulo Carvalho as Celso Torres
- Desireé Vignolli as Bárbara Lourenço
- Mara Carvalho as Ângela Almeida
- Jonathan Nogueira as Pedro Alcântara
- Natália Lage as Beatriz "Bia" Amaral
- Tatyane Goulart as Carolina "Carol" Torres de Almeida Lovatelli
- Amanda Acosta as Eva Alcântara
- Murilo Figueiredo as André Amaral
- Luã Ubacker as Leonardo "Léo" Azevedo

=== Guest stars ===
- Paulo José as Ivo Simeone
- Marco Nanini as Breno Ferraz
- Joana Rocha as Carolina Aguiar
- Françoise Forton as Fernanda Sabino
- Lima Duarte as Mauro Camargo
- Stênio Garcia as Pedro Cunha
- Tony Ramos as Jorge Flores
- Airton Aranha as Allan Telles
- Xuxa Lopes as Priscilane Souto
- Catalina Bonaki as Gracyanne Ariola
- Yaçanã Martins as Felipa Maria de Freitas
- Guilherme Karan as Caíque Martelo "Dr. Martelo"
- Yara Vitória as Maura de Carvalho
- Leina Krespi as Zuleica Camargo
- Lícia Magna as Jurema Sousa "Vizinha de Zilda"
- João Signorelli as Carlos "Carlito" Fernando
- Marcelo Escorel as Paulo Ricardo de Freitas
- Malu Valle as Beatriz Pereira
- Miwa Yanagizawa as Rafaela Torres
- Silvia Pareja as Berenice Fragoso
- Sacy as Tônico Lemos
- Waldir Rodrigues as Flávio Garcia
- Paulo Rezende as Edmundo Leitão
- Eduarda Valente as Mariana de Jesus
