= Tato Gabus Mendes =

Brazilian actor (born 1958)

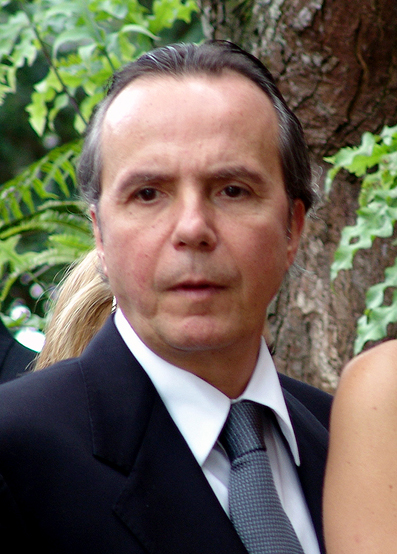
- Born: Luiz Otávio Gabus Mendes; December 22, 1957 (age 68); São Paulo, Brazil
- Other names: Tato Gabus
- Occupation: Actor
- Years active: 1976–present
- Spouse: Mariana da Silva Telles (m. 2004)
- Children: 2
- Parent: Cassiano Gabus Mendes
- Relatives: Cássio Gabus Mendes (brother); Otávio Gabus Mendes (paternal grandfather); Luis Gustavo (maternal uncle)

Luiz Otávio Gabus Mendes (born December 22, 1957) in São Paulo) is a Brazilian actor.

== Biography ==
He is the grandson of Otávio Gabus Mendes, the son of the telenovelas author Cassiano Gabus Mendes, the nephew of the actor Luiz Gustavo and the brother of the also actor Cássio Gabus Mendes.

== Career ==
His television debut was in the Ti Ti Ti novel (85), authored by his father, playing Alex, one of the sons of Jacques Leclair (Reginaldo Faria). He then makes an original version of Sinhá Moça (86), as José, a young man who falls in love with the slave Adelaide (Solange Couto).

Later he would work in the novels of his father, like Brega & Chique (87), like Maurício and Que Rei Sou Eu? (89), such as Pichot/Lucien, this being his first role of greatest impact and repercussion, making pair with Cláudia Abreu (Juliette). He followed other works such as Perigosas Peruas (92), as the puzzled Paulinho Pamonha and O Mapa da Mina (93), as Raul Gouveia. In addition to these novels, Fera Radical (88), like Paxá, and Mico Preto (90), like Adolfo, son of Áurea (Márcia Real).

In 1994, he made another of his best roles, the novel Quatro por Quatro (94), as the hypochondriac Alcebíades, better known as Alce. Her character initially made pair with Auxiliadora (Elizabeth Savalla), and this one discovers that he betrayed her with Elisa Maria (Lizandra Souto). He then made the novel O Fim do Mundo (96), as Vadeco, and later made three novels alongside Betty Lago: O Amor Está no Ar (97), as Filipe, Pecado Capital (98), as Valdir and Uga-Uga (2000), as Anísio.

In 2002, he made for the first time a novel by Antônio Calmon, O Beijo do Vampiro (2002), as the hilarious Bartô, pairing with Betty Gofman (Amélie) and starring for the first time with his uncle Luis Gustavo (Galileu), both playing father and son in the plot. Soon, in 2004, he made the miniseries Um Só Coração (2004), as Paulo Prado, and the novel Como uma Onda (2004), as the womanizer Pedroca do Espírito Santo, and in 2006, in double dose for the second time, (2006), as Júlio Soares in Páginas da Vida (2006), as Leandro, son of Tide (Tarcísio Meira) and Lalinha (Glória Menezes).

In 2008, in double dose for the third time, it makes the miniseries Queridos Amigos (2008), like Fernando, and Três Irmãs (2008), like Orlando, making pair with Beth Goulart (Leonora). He then remakes Ti Ti Ti (2010) as Breno Rodrigues, and then made O Astro (2011), as the unscrupulous Amin Hayalla, married to Jamile (Carolina Kasting), but who has an affair with lover Sílvia (Bel Kutner).

In 2012, has been in Cheias de Charme, as the villain Dr. Sarmento. In 2013, he was in Sangue Bom as Franklin Cardoso.

In 2017, he played Pedro Malan in the film Real: O Plano por Trás da História.

== Personal life ==
He is married to the designer Mariana da Silva Telles, and father of Pedro Gabus Mendes and Luisa Gabus Mendes.

== Filmography ==
=== Television ===
Year	Title	Role
1985	Ti Ti Ti	Alexandre Moraes (Alex)
1986	Sinhá Moça	José Coutinho
1987	Brega & Chique	Maurício Carvalho Lontra
1988	Fera Radical	Paulo Paxá da Silva (Paxá)
1989	Que Rei Sou Eu?	Lucien Élan (Pichot/Rei Petrus II)
1990	Mico Preto	Adolfo Menezes Garcia
1992	Perigosas Peruas	Paulo Pereira (Paulinho Pamonha)
1993	O Mapa da Mina	Raul Gouveia
1994	Você Decide	9 episodes
1994	Quatro por Quatro	Alcebíades Augusto Fontes (Alce)
1996	O Fim do Mundo	Valdison Ramalho (Vadeco)
1996	Sai de Baixo	Delegado Lopes (Eps: "Ribatur Turismo")
1997	O Amor Está no Ar	Filipe Schnaider
1997	Malhação	Eduardo Kleber Siqueira
1998	Pecado Capital	Valdir Cabral Soares
1999	Terra Nostra	Fabrício Penna (Dr. Penna)
2000	Uga-Uga	Anísio Karabastos
2001	Brava Gente	Aureliano (Eps: "A Sonata")
2001	Malhação	Renato Ferreira
2002	O Beijo do Vampiro	Bartolomeu Van Burgo (Bartô)
2003	Sítio do Picapau Amarelo	Bacamarte (Eps: "O Sumiço de Emília")
2004	Um Só Coração	Paulo da Silva Prado (Paulo Prado)
2004	A Diarista	Fúlvio (Eps: "Quem Vai Ficar com Marinete")
2004	Como uma Onda	Pedro do Espírito Santo (Pedroca)
2005	A Diarista	Advogado de Figueirinha (Eps: "Aquele da Cafeína")
2006	JK	Júlio Soares
2006	Páginas da Vida	Leandro Fragoso Martins de Andrade
2007	Amazônia, de Galvez a Chico Mendes	Brito Rezende
2007	Toma Lá, Dá Cá	Mestre Shonganashana (Eps: "O Homem que Veio Arrochar")
2008	Queridos Amigos	Fernando da Silva Prestes
2008	Casos e Acasos	Saulo Barbosa
2008	Casos e Acasos	Vicente Santini
2008	Três Irmãs	Orlando Malatesta
2010	Ti Ti Ti	Breno Rodrigues
2011	O Astro	Amin Hayalla
2012	Cheias de Charme	Ernani Sarmento
2013	Sangue Bom	Franklin Cardoso (Cardoso)
2014	Império	Severo Aguiar da Silva
2016	A Lei do Amor	Olavo Maciel
2017	Os Trapalhões	Chef do Didico
2018	Orgulho e Paixão	Felisberto Benedito
2021	Quanto Mais Vida, Melhor!	Daniel Monteiro Bragança
2025	Vale Tudo	Alfredo Queiroz

=== Film ===
- 2017 - Real - O Plano Por Trás da História - Pedro Malan
