= Alô, Doçura! =

Brazilian television series base on American TV series I Love Lucy

Alô, Doçura! is a Brazilian television series created by Cassiano Gabus Mendes and aired by TV Tupi (1953–1964). It was based on the American series I Love Lucy.

== Cast ==
- Eva Wilma
- John Herbert
- Mário Sérgio
- Marly Bueno
- Luis Gustavo
- Yoná Magalhães
- Marisa Prado
