= Bianca Byington =

Brazilian actress

- Born: 23 October 1966 (age 59); Rio de Janeiro, Brazil
- Occupation: Actress

Bianca Byington (born 23 October 1966) is a Brazilian actress.

== Biography ==
At eleven years old, she began her career as a member of the choir, the first staging of the musical The acrobats, Chico Buarque. At thirteen, she filmed the feature film Tormenta, Umberto Molo and two years later shared the Kikito for best supporting actress Carla Camurati and Ruthinéia de Moraes, the Festival de Gramado.

Around the same time, won the title of the Rio summer muse and starred in the film Garota Dourada, Antônio Calmon, who return to work a few years later, in such productions as Corpo Dourado and O Beijo do Vampiro, displayed by Rede Globo in 1998 and 2002, respectively.

In 1986 she made her television debut, at the hands of director Roberto Talma, the miniseries Anos Dourados by Gilberto Braga, displayed by Rede Globo, where she lived and the character Marina, one of the best friends of the protagonist Maria de Lourdes, lived by actress Malu Mader. Even on television, lived unforgettable characters such as the hilarious Téia of Perigosas Peruas (1992), and Gertrudes de Sá in A Padroeira (2001). In 2004, gave birth to the Maria da Encarnação Junqueira, an insecure woman in the soap opera Como uma Onda, Walter Negrão.

Already in 2006, returning from Portugal, where she was invited to film director José Fonseca e Costa the film Viúva Rica Solteira Não Fica, Byington was invited by Carlos Lombardi, author of Perigosas Peruas, who has also had worked at Quatro por Quatro (1994), to make a cameo on the soap opera Bang Bang, where she played the widow Jones.

In 2008, she participated in two episodes of the show Casos e Acasos, and that same year participated in the soap opera Três Irmãs by Antônio Calmon. In 2009, the series makes cameo Toma Lá, Dá Cá, Chico e Amigos and S.O.S. Emergência. In 2011, makes a cameo on the soap opera Insensato Coração.

In 2012, the episode was "A Fofoqueira de Porto Alegre" in series As Brasileiras.

In 2013, she was hired by Rede Record will be where the first novel of author Carlos Lombardi in broadcast. Byington and Lombardi worked together in Perigosas Peruas (1992) and Quatro por Quatro (1994).

== Filmography ==
=== Television ===
Year	Title	Role	Notes
1986	Anos Dourados	Marina Campos Dornelles	
1986	Armação Ilimitada	Ariadne	Episode: "O Canto da Sereia"
1989	O Sexo dos Anjos	Neide	
1992	Perigosas Peruas	Téia (Sthepanie Bergman Della Chiesa)	
1993	Você Decide		Episode: "Jogo de Corpo"
1993	O Mapa da Mina	Laís Azevedo	
1994	Você Decide	Tereza	Episode: "A Doação"
1994	Confissões de Adolescente	Customer	Episode: "Barbara Vai a Luta"
1994	Quatro por Quatro	Elizabeth Herrera Franco (Beth)	
1996	Malhação de Verão	Dóris Simões de Andrade	
1996	A Comédia da Vida Privada	Ana Paula	Episode: "Mulheres"
1996	Malhação	Dóris Simões de Andrade	Season 2
1998	Corpo Dourado	Diana Cruz	
1999	Dartagnan e os Três Mosqueteiros	Milady	
2000	Brava Gente	Ana	Episode: "Um Edifício Chamado 200"
2001	Vide Bula	Various characters	
2001	A Padroeira	Gertrudes de Sá	
2004	A Diarista	Bárbara	Episode: "Separações"
2004	Carga Pesada	Zíngara	Episode: "Zíngara"
2004	Como uma Onda	Encarnação Junqueira	
2006	Bang Bang	widow Jones	Episodes: "January 13–16, 2006"
2006	O Super Sincero	Rachel	Episode: "Outra Vez"
2006	A Grande Família	Sofia	Episode: "O Dia da Surpresa"
2007	Malhação	Talita Albuquerque (Tatá)	Season 14
2007	Os Amadores	Cecília	Episode: "December 21, 2007"
2008	Casos e Acasos	Kika	Episode: "O Presente, a Sociedade e a Tentação"
2008	Casos e Acasos	Adélia	Episode: "O Encontro, o Homem Ideal e a Estréia"
2008	Três Irmãs	Gilda Sueli	
2009	Toma Lá, Dá Cá	Celimar	Episode: "Respondez Sil Vous Plait"
2009	Chico e Amigos	Letícia	Special year-end
2010	S.O.S. Emergência	Mirtes	Episode: "Hora de Ir pra Cama"
2010	A Grande Família	Glorinha	Episode: "As Malas da Prima Glorinha"; Episode: "Deu, Tá Dado!"
2011	Aline	Renata	Episode: "Aline x Vera"
2011	Insensato Coração	Dulce Petroni	Episodes: "July 16–30, 2011"
2012	As Brasileiras	Flavia	Episode: "A Fofoqueira de Porto Alegre"
2013	A Grande Família	Lalá	Episode: "O Monstro do Ciúme"
2013	Pecado Mortal	Ilana Vergueiro	
2015	Vizinhos	Luiza	
2017	Segredos de Justiça	Maria José da Silva	Episode: "Nem Tudo é Verdade"
2017	TOC's de Dalila	Norma	Episode: "Último Pedido"
2018	Brasil a Bordo	Arlete Natari	Episode: "1"

=== Internet ===
Year	Title	Role	Notes
2015	Porta dos Fundos	Judge	Episode: "Juíza"
2015	Porta dos Fundos	Dweller	Episode: "Caixinha"
2016	Porta dos Fundos	Reporter	Episode: "Conta Pra Gente"
2017	Porta dos Fundos	Yoga teacher	Episode: "Ioga Brasileira"

=== Film ===
- 1980 - Tormenta, of Umberto Molo
- 1984 - Garota Dourada, of Antônio Calmon
- 1984 - Amor Voraz, of Walter Hugo Khouri
- 1987 - A Mulher Fatal Encontra o Homem Ideal (short film), of Carla Camurati
- 1997 - For All - O Trampolim da Vitória, of Buza Ferraz e Luiz Carlos Lacerda
- 2000 - Estorvo, of Ruy Guerra
- 2000 - O Barato é Ser Careta, of Tizuka Yamasaki
- 2000 - Deus Jr., of Mauro Lima
- 2004 - A Dona da História, of Daniel Filho
- 2006 - Trair e coçar é só começar, of Moacyr Góes
- 2006 - Viúva Rica Solteira Não Fica, of José Fonseca e Costa
- 2007 - A Última Juventude, of Domingos de Oliveira
- 2012 - Eu Não Faço a Menor Ideia do que eu Tô Fazendo Com a Minha Vida, of Matheus Souza
- 2012 - Noites de Reis, of Vinícius Reis
- 2017 - Minha Família Perfeita, of Felipe Joffily
