= Começar de Novo =

Television series

- Genre: Telenovela
- Created by: Antônio Calmon; Elizabeth Jhin
- Directed by: Marcos Paulo
- Starring: Marcos Paulo; Natália do Vale; Eva Wilma; Giselle Itié; Vladimir Brichta; Luis Gustavo; Marília Pêra; Carlos Vereza; Werner Schünemann; Carolina Ferraz; Erik Marmo; Antônio Abujamra; Paloma Duarte; Solange Couto; Antônio Pedro; Luíza Tomé; Antônio Calloni
- Country of origin: Brazil
- Original language: Portuguese
- No. of episodes: 196

Production
- Running time: 50 minutes

Original release
- Network: TV Globo
- Release: 30 August 2004 – 16 April 2005

Related
- Da Cor do Pecado; A Lua Me Disse

Começar de Novo is a Brazilian telenovela produced by TV Globo and aired between 30 August 2004 and 16 April 2005.

It stars Marcos Paulo, Natália do Vale, Eva Wilma, Werner Schünemann, Carlos Vereza, Giselle Itié, Vladimir Brichta, Carolina Ferraz, Luis Gustavo and Marília Pêra in the lead roles.

== Synopsis ==
=== First phase ===
With the background to the oil industry, the central plot of the soap opera revolves around the love between Archangel Michael and Leticia, which begins when they are still children and becomes a strong passion in adolescence. The girl's relatives - especially his mother, Lucrécia Borges - are against the union, because they belong to a wealthy family and traditional, refusing to marry a poor Leticia, who thinks the opposite of the family, and like people for who they are and not for what he has, but his mother only thinks about money and appearances.

Totally in love, married just 17 attempts to escape and Lucrécia discovers that his daughter went away and decided to save the future of her marriage without resources, thinking she will be unhappy, hires a thug to kill Miguel, the chasing and he is shot in the head, to the despair of Leticia, the force that is carried back to his house for wrongs suffered much from the mother. Michael ends up being between life and death. The boy, then, is presumed dead, since most had no vital signs and his body is released to the morgue, but he wakes up and his friend who was the burial takes you to a distant hospital and he recovers from injury, but is out of memory. He is terrified, not knowing anything about his past and only have a few memories.

To protect him, because he knew it was an attempt on his life, Ivan Mishkin, a family friend takes him to Moscow, capital of the Soviet Union.

Meanwhile, Leticia discovers that his great love died, going into deep depression and despair. To make matters worse Miguel discovers she is pregnant. His mother finds out and is horrified. Thinking more on money that the family will accumulate and a little to save the daughter of a single mother, Leticia condemned to a marriage with Anselmo, a millionaire oil industry. Trapped, destroyed from within and without hope, for Michael is dead, she marries and says to her husband who married pregnant, into thinking that the child is his, at the behest of his mother, to his misfortune.

As time passes, Miguel is advised to forget his past and adopt a new identity under the name Andrei Ivanovitch. He becomes a successful businessman in Russia and, together with his friend, establishes a large company.

=== Second phase ===
Thirty years later, after numerous treatments and drugs, he finally reclaims memory and decides to return to Brazil with his master and teacher Dimitri Nicolaevich to unravel the mysteries of his life, as it has not regained his memory. The only thing he remembered all these years was a girl who kissed him, but not the name he knew and lived always in search of it. He tries to rediscover this woman be his great love, which is Leticia. But she's married to Anselmo, his best friend in youth, which makes it totally devastated and confused and Leticia is thrilled to learn that the man still lives his life.

Miguel, then, to try to forget it, get involved with the young Julia. Meanwhile, his enemies Lucrécia Borges and Ademar, the corrupt mayor of the city, suspect that Miguel is the young man thought to be dead for thirty years. And they do not know that Miguel is planning revenge against them. And Miguel does not know who is the nephew of Elvis, married to a radio friendly "Natureba" stoned Janis, a hilarious lady, but the one that faces an equal powerful Lucrécia Borges.

Leticia and Miguel reunite to pursue a shared objective involving opposition to external actors, maintaining their relationship over time.

== Cast ==
Actor	Character
Marcos Paulo	Miguel Arcanjo Karamazov (Andrei Ivanovitch)
Natália do Vale	Letícia Borges
Giselle Itié	Júlia Magnani Moreno
Eva Wilma	Lucrécia Borges
Luis Gustavo	Elvis Doidão (Glauco Silveira)
Marília Pêra	Janis Doidona (Marlene Emilinha Silveira)
Carlos Vereza	Ademar Nóbrega
Vladimir Brichta	Pedro Borges
Werner Schünemann	Anselmo Pessoa
Carolina Ferraz	Gigi (Gisela Manhães)
Antônio Calloni	Olavinho (Olavo Bilac Borges)
Luíza Tomé	Lúcia Borges
Erik Marmo	Carlos Moreno
Paloma Duarte	Carmem Nóbrega
Cássio Gabus Mendes	Sid (Sidarta Gautama Silveira)
Antônio Abujamra	Dimitri Nicolaievitch
Solange Couto	Joana Pimenta
Antônio Pedro	Dr. Pimenta
Lília Cabral	Aída
Cássia Linhares	Maria Rocha
Roberta Gualda	Linda Flor de Linhares
Manuela do Monte	Branca das Neves
Eduardo Galvão	Arthur Rios / Paulo
Bel Kutner	Marilyn Monteiro / Rita
Stephany Brito	Dandara Gautama Silveira
Fernanda Machado	Sonya Karamazov
Eduardo Pires	Abel Borges
Felipe Folgosi	Rico
Kayky Brito	Betinho Gautama Silveira
Juliana Lohmann	Teca Borges
Marina Ruy Barbosa	Aninha
Lúcia Alves	Ítala Magnani
Betty Gofman	Anita Estrela
Guilherme Piva	Márcio Estrela
Thalma de Freitas	Elvira
Carolyna Aguiar	Isadora
Luma Costa	Marcianita Estrela
Rosane Gofman	Rosário
Maurício Gonçalves	Jairo
Tony Tornado	Xavier
Gustavo Mello	Moacir
Nívea Helen	Margarida
Max Fercondini	Murilo
Isabel Fillardis	Eurídice
Maria Clara Mattos	Simone
Carmo Dalla Vecchia	Tenório
Pedro Malta	Pepê Gautama Silveira
Guilherme Bernard	Lucas
Ramon Francisco	Dudu
Bruno Pereira	Mário
Rafael Ciani	Kiko Borges

=== Supporting cast ===
Actor	Character
Dalton Vigh	Johnny
Tarcísio Filho	Estêvão Cidreira
Bruno Garcia	Tiago Dinis
Thiago Rodrigues	Miguel Arcanjo (young)
Camila dos Anjos	Letícia (young)
Leona Cavalli	Lucrécia Borges (young)
Edward Boggis	Anselmo (young)
Wagner Santisteban	Olavinho (young)
Deborah Evelyn	Dora
Daniel Dantas	Wagner
Odilon Wagner	Péricles
Virgínia Cavendish	Virgínia
Gláucio Gomes	Delfino
Elaine Mickely	Tânia Mimosa
Emiliano Queiroz	Ivan Mishkin
Milton Gonçalves	Lázaro
Oswaldo Loureiro	Albert
Paula Franco	Anna Karamazoff
Celso Frateschi	Mikail Karamazoff
Lauro Góes	Romualdo Cidreira
Cristina Pereira	Lavínia Teodora
Rogério Fróes	Eurípedes
Suzana Faini	juíza
Deyse Braga	Mônica
Marco Miranda	Mateus
Érika Evantini	Teresa
Bruna di Túllio	Roseclair
Olívia Torres	Marcinha
Jaime Leibovitch	Leon
Kiko Mascarenhas	Sandro
Mariah da Penha	Neuza
William Vita	henchman of Lucrécia Borges
Rogério Barros	Jorge
Victor Cugula	Miguel Arcanjo (child)
Sarah Maciel	Letícia (child)
