= Perigosas Peruas =

- Genre: Telenovela, Romance comedy
- Created by: Carlos Lombardi under the supervision of Lauro César Muniz
- Starring: Vera Fischer; Sílvia Pfeifer; Mário Gomes; Alexandre Frota; Guilherme Karan; Beth Goulart; Cláudia Lira; Cassiano Gabus Mendes; José Lewgoy; Tato Gabus Mendes; Françoise Forton; Bianca Byington; Rômulo Arantes; Irving São Paulo; Sílvia Buarque; Natália Lage
- Opening theme: "Perigosas Peruas"
- Composer: As Frenéticas
- Country of origin: Brazil
- Original language: Portuguese
- No. of episodes: 173

Production
- Production company: Central Globo de Produção

Original release
- Network: Rede Globo
- Release: 10 February – 28 August 1992

Related
- Vamp; Deus Nos Acuda

Perigosas Peruas is a Brazilian telenovela that was aired on TV Globo from 10 February to 28 August 1992 at 7:00 p.m. It ran for 173 episodes. It was written by Carlos Lombardi, with the script supervised by Lauro César Muniz and directed by Roberto Talma.

== Synopsis ==
Friends from their childhood, Cidinha and Leda followed opposite paths: the former became a housewife who never thought of working outside, and the latter became a successful professional with aversion to marriage and children. In common, just a love of the past: Belo, son of the Italian Dona Gemma, who eventually married Cidinha.

What Cidinha does not know is that, during her pregnancy, Leda also expected a baby from Belo and that, with the premature death of Cidinha's baby, Belo had changed the babies in the maternity ward.

Back in Brazil after years of professional success abroad, Leda will claim custody of her daughter with Cidinha. But Belo works for the Torremolinos, a powerful family of the Mafia, headed by the cousins Franco and Branco. And they involve Belo in a big mess: either he kills Leda and Cidinha, or they kill him.

== Cast ==
Actor	Character
Vera Fischer	Cidinha (Ma. Aparecida Falcão Belotto)
Sílvia Pfeifer	Leda Vallenari
Mário Gomes	Antônio Belotto (Belo)
Alexandre Frota	Jaú (Ângelo Garcia)
Guilherme Karan	Hector Torremolinos
Beth Goulart	Diana Torremolinos
Cláudia Lira	Manuela Torremolinos
John Herbert	Cervantes
Françoise Forton	Caroline
Tato Gabus Mendes	Paulinho Pamonha (Paulo)
Bianca Byington	Teia (Sthepanie Bergman Della Chiesa)
Rômulo Arantes	Téio (Otávio)
Irving São Paulo	Johann Boll
Gerson Brener	Giovanni Barbieri
Felipe Martins	João Maluco (João Falcão)
Sílvia Buarque	Maria Doida (Maria Cecília Villar)
Fabiana Scaranzi	Joana Carvalho
Flávio Colatrello Jr.	Baby Face
Carlos Kroeber	Michelângelo Belotto
Rosita Thomaz Lopes	Walkíria Souto Maior
Alberto Baruque	Romano Garcia
Leina Krespi	Ambrósia Garcia
Ana Paula Bouzas	Pimenta
Victor Branco	PH (Paulo Henrique)
Cissa Guimarães	Zu (Zulmira)
Fernanda Muniz	Irina
Children
Natália Lage	Andréa Falcão Belotto (Tuca)
Igor Logullo	Toninho (Antônio Belotto Filho)
Alberto Neves	Pinduca
Special participations
Nicette Bruno	Vivian Bergman
Flávio Migliaccio	Venâncio Falcão
Nair Bello	Dona Gema
Cassiano Gabus Mendes	D. Franco Torremolinos
José Lewgoy	D. Branco Torremolinos
Hilton Cobra	Operator
