= Três Irmãs =

- Genre: Telenovela
- Created by: Antônio Calmon
- Directed by: Dennis Carvalho; José Luiz Villamarim
- Starring: Cláudia Abreu; Giovanna Antonelli; Carolina Dieckmann; Ana Rosa; Vera Holtz; Marcos Palmeira; Rodrigo Hilbert; Paulo Vilhena; Dudu Azevedo; Emanuelle Araújo; Bruno Garcia; Marcos Caruso; Regina Duarte; José Wilker
- Opening theme: "Don't Worry, Be Happy" by Mart'nália
- Country of origin: Brazil
- Original language: Portuguese
- No. of episodes: 179

Original release
- Network: TV Globo
- Release: 15 September 2008 – 10 April 2009

Três Irmãs is a Brazilian telenovela produced and aired by TV Globo, from 15 September 2008 to 10 April 2009 with a total of 179 episodes, replacing Beleza Pura, being replaced by Caras & Bocas.

== Plot ==
The plot is based on Virginia and her daughters, the three sisters: Dora, Alma and Susana, in their respective pursuits for happiness, having as background a fictitious beach, the beautiful Blue Beach.

Dora is the eldest daughter of Virginia. Widow and mother of Marquinho, she lives with her mother-in-law, the villain Violeta Aquila, who blames her for the premature death of her son, Artur Aquila. She's a beautiful, funny, high-spirited woman. With the onset of her mother's illness, she moves to Praia Azul. With the arrival of orthodontist Bento, who has just lost his wife, Teresa, that they will start a beautiful love story, marked mainly by Violeta's interference, who will do anything to destroy her daughter-in-law's happiness. With the beginning of the romance of Bento and Dora, Violeta will make the grandson against the relationship, and the boy will find in Rafinha, Bento's eldest daughter; they form an alliance to disrupt their parents' romance.

Alma is the middle sister, a beautiful and intelligent woman, but confused and clumsy. She lived in Rio de Janeiro, where she is a doctor. She is very lucky at work, but not in love. With the end of her relationship with Robinho begins Virginia's illness. She will head to Caramirim, where she will find surfer Gregg and the unscrupulous Hercules Galvão, his great loves from the past, who struggled enough to be happy alongside the woman they really say love. Alma will work in the Caramirim outpatient clinic alongside Dr. Alcides, Violeta's husband and his great friend and protector, who in the past helped pay for her medical studies.

Susana is the youngest, and adopted. She's the only one, who lives next to her mother. She is a beautiful, natural woman. A Geography teacher at the local school and also an excellent surfer. But the daily life of Susana and the residents of Caramirim will change with the arrival of the other two sisters to the city. However, what will change her life will be the arrival of Walkíria, with whom she will have overwhelming passion and obstacles.

== Cast ==
Actor	Character
Cláudia Abreu	Dora Jequitibá Áquila
Giovanna Antonelli	Alma Jequitibá Áquila
Carolina Dieckmann	Suzana Jequitibá Áquila
Ana Rosa	Virgínia Jequitibá
Vera Holtz	Violeta Áquila
Marcos Palmeira	Bento Rio Preto
Rodrigo Hilbert	Gregório de Matos (Greg)
Paulo Vilhena	Eros Pascolli
Dudu Azevedo	Alexandre Galvão (Xande)
Emanuelle Araújo	Maria Sonia Ferreira (Soninha Rainha)
Bruno Garcia	Hércules Galvão
Marcos Caruso	Dr. Alcides Áquila
Regina Duarte	Waldete Maria do Nascimento Bezerra / Verônica Ramos
José Wilker	Augusto Pinheiro / Lázaro Nunes
John Herbert	Excelência Gutierrez (Tubarão Branco)
Maitê Proença	Walquíria Pascolli
Marcello Novaes	Sandro Pedreira
Malu Galli	Lígia Pedreira (Liginha)
Othon Bastos	Dr. Francisco Polidoro
Hugo Carvana	Dr. Silvano Andrade
Daniela Récco	Maria Eduarda Bulhões da Silveira (Duda)
Kayky Brito	Paulo Fernando Áquila (Paulinho)
Graziella Moretto	Valéria Gutierrez
Luis Gustavo	Vidigal Castro
Otávio Augusto	Francisco Benete (Chuchu)
Débora Duarte	Florinda Áquila
Roberto Bonfim	Pacífico Áquila
Solange Couto	Janaína
Ailton Graça	Clodoaldo Astrogildo da Conceição (Jacaré)
Roberta Rodrigues	Neide (Neidinha)
Otávio Müller	Gennaro Fortuna
Beth Goulart	Leonora Malatesta
Tato Gabus Mendes	Orlando Malatesta
Aloísio de Abreu	Prefeito Nelson Santana
Malu Valle	Neuza Santana
Bianca Byington	Gilda Sueli
Erik Marmo	Dr. Ricardo Rios
Cássio Gabus Mendes	Baby Montenegro
Maria Eduarda de Carvalho	Maria do Carmo (Carminha)
Guilherme Piva	Glauco Campo Santo
Juliana Schalch	Laila Galvão
Leonardo Carvalho	Alfredo Malatesta (Alfredão)
Ivan Mendes	Pedro Henrique Santana (PH)
Cecília Dassi	Natália Malatesta
Camila dos Anjos	Antônia
Sidy Correa	Sávio Campo Santo
Antônia Frering	Sylvie L'Eclair
Carlos Loffler	Adamastor Pamplona
Ana Paula Botelho	Moema Augusta
Kenya Costta	Iracema
Sylbeth Soriano	Borborema
Vítor Novello	Marco Antônio Jequitibá Áquila (Marquinho)
Thávyne Ferrari	Rafaela Rio Preto (Rafinha)
Caio Vydal	Gilberto Áquila (Gibo)
Rafael Ciani	Antônio (Toninho)
Malu Rodrigues	Marina
Omar Docena	Jerry
Estrela Blanco	Melissa (Mel)
Pedro Rossa	Luiz Roberto Santana
Matheus Costa	Lucas Rio Preto
Rachel de Queiroz	Zara
Caio Vaz	Thor Pedreira
Brenno Leone	Zig Pedreira
