= Quatro por Quatro =

- Genre: Romantic comedy
- Created by: Carlos Lombardi
- Written by: Maurício Arruda; Ronaldo Santos
- Directed by: Ricardo Waddington
- Starring: Elizabeth Savalla; Cristiana Oliveira; Betty Lago; Letícia Spiller
- Opening theme: "Picadinho de Macho" by Sandra de Sá
- Country of origin: Brazil
- Original language: Portuguese
- No. of episodes: 233

Production
- Production company: Central Globo de Produção

Original release
- Network: Rede Globo
- Release: 24 October 1994 – 22 July 1995

Quatro por Quatro (English: Four Lives, Four Loves) is a Brazilian telenovela produced by TV Globo. It aired from 24 October 1994 to 22 July 1995. The telenovela is written by Carlos Lombardi and directed by Ricardo Waddington.

== Synopsis ==
A traffic accident causes four women's destinies to intertwine. In the series, the four enter a pact of revenge against the men who hit them and caused them to suffer. Auxiliadora struggled to help her husband Alcebíades prosper, but when he leaves her for a younger woman, is thrown out of the house. The shy Tatiana was engaged to Fortunato, who failed to show up at their wedding. Babalu caught mechanic Raí in bed with another woman. Abigail, a preppy psychologist who is struggling in a failing marriage, decides superficially to continue it but revolts against her husband, Gustavo, who humiliates her in public at a congress. Gustavo has custody of Ângela, a girl who longs to know her true father, Bruno. Her mother died in the childbirth, traumatizing him.

== Production ==
=== Development ===
Originally, Quatro por Quatro was to premiere at the end of 1995, but the telenovela that was to replace A Viagem was canceled two months before the premiere. In September 1994, Carlos Lombardi was told by programming director Mário Lúcio Vaz that his project had been moved up and would be on the air in 56 days. At the time, Lombardi had only told Vaz what his telenovela was about, but he hadn't even written the outline yet, having to develop the whole story and deliver the first ten episodes in a month so that filming could begin two weeks before the premiere - the first episode finished being filming on the day of the premiere.

When Boni, Globo's director, came back from vacation and saw the advertisements for the telenovela, he ordered it to be taken off the air and canceled a week before the premiere, because he didn't agree with four women in the lead roles instead of a traditional couple. However, Mário Lúcio convinced him that the plot was coherent with the youth culture of the time and would be well received by the public. Due to the unforeseen circumstances, Carlos Lombardi was promised that the telenovela would only have 120 episodes, shorter than normal. However, on the day of the premiere, the telenovela was announced to have 160 episodes and was extended even further, to 233 episodes, due to the positive reception. Lombardi stated that his intention was precisely to present a "light and raunchy" comedy to counterpoint its predecessor, which was "dense and dramatic", and cited the telenovela Guerra dos Sexos (1983) and the film Ela É o Diabo (1989) as references, both having the theme of women's revenge.

Quatro por Quatro was cited as innovative for featuring four female protagonists instead of a main couple, as was the standard in telenovelas until then.

=== Casting ===
Carlos Lombardi wrote the four main characters to be played by Eliane Giardini, Bruna Lombardi, Malu Mader and Adriana Esteves as Auxiliadora, Abigail, Tatiana and Babalu, respectively, but none of them ended up being in the telenovela. Bruna and Adriana declined, the former didn't want to leave Rede Manchete, where she presented Gente de Expressão, while the latter was facing a crisis of depression because of the criticism she received in Renascer, which caused her to terminate her contract with Rede Globo. Eliane and Malu, on the other hand, were rejected by the directors, one because she was still considered "raw" in her previous roles, while the other was booked for Irmãos Coragem, which she never joined. In their place were cast Elizabeth Savalla, Betty Lago, Cristiana Oliveira and Letícia Spiller, who was originally going to play Duda, a role that went to Luana Piovani. Alexandre Frota was cast as Raí, but was replaced by Marcello Novaes when Ricardo Waddington took over as director. Capoeirista Beto Simas appeared in the opening credits sequence fighting four female fencers.

== Cast ==
- Elizabeth Savalla as Auxiliadora Fontes ("Condessa" Carmen Almodóvar / Maria do Socorro)
- Cristiana Oliveira as Tatiana Tarantino (Maria das Dores Santanna / Raio de Sol)
- Betty Lago as Abigail Rossine / Bibi (Calpúrnia / Pupu / Sharon)
- Letícia Spiller as Barbarela Lourdes de Almeida (Babalu)
- Humberto Martins as Dr. Bruno Herrera Franco
- Marcello Novaes as Raimundo "Raí" Schillatti
- Marcos Paulo as Dr. Gustavo Rossini
- Tato Gabus Mendes as Alcebíades "Alce" Augusto Fontes
- Diogo Vilela as Fortunato
- Helena Ranaldi as Mércia Arruda Franco / Suzana Sales
- Tatyane Goulart as Ângela Sales Herrera Franco
- Tássia Camargo as Maria Bataglia
- Marcelo Serrado as Danilo de Almeida
- Márcia Real as Isadora Herrera Franco
- Daniel Dantas as Celso Herrera Franco
- Bianca Byington as Elizabeth "Beth" Herrera Franco
- Kadu Moliterno as Samuel Spadafora / Samuca Espada
- Françoise Forton as Clarisse
- Lizandra Souto as Elisa Maria
- Nina de Pádua as Dra. Fabíola
- Bete Mendes as Dona Fátima
- Jorge Dória as Seu Santinho
- Marcelo Faria as Ralado / Gustavo Rossini Júnior
- Paulo César Grande as Thiago
- Rômulo Arantes as Pedrão
- Drica Moraes as Denise
- Leonardo Vieira as Vinícius Loducca
- Luana Piovani as Duda / Maria Eduarda Ferreira da Rocha
- Paulo Guarnieri as Átila Fontes
- Estelita Bell as Eugenia
- Renata Fronzi as Vânia
- Oswaldo Loureiro as Olegário
- Geórgia Gomide as Laura
- Mário Lago as Henrique Pessoa
- Suely Franco as Calpúrnia Fontes
- Neusa Borges as Teresa
- Inês Galvão as Marta Rocha
- Henri Pagnoncelli as delegado Soares
- Íris Bustamante as Silvia
- Bete Mendes as Fatima
- Hugo Gross as Leandro
- Jorge Pontual as Gui
- Fabiana Ramos as Paula
- Karla Muga as Daniela
- Eduardo Caldas as Dinho
- Luciana Coutinho as Norma Shirley
- Alexandre Salcedo as Alexandre
- Alberto Baruque as Tufik
- Ana Maria Folly as Elzinha
- Luíza Curvo as Renata
- Ingrid Fridmann as Ju
- Christine Fernandes as Ralado's girlfriend
- Fernanda Nobre as Lolô
- Nestor de Montemar as Carlos Magno
- Cláudio Corrêa e Castro as Doctor
- Marly Bueno as Mônica Sales
