= Elas por Elas (1982 TV series) =

- Genre: Telenovela; Romance comedy
- Created by: Cassiano Gabus Mendes
- Directed by: Paulo Ubiratan
- Starring: Luiz Gustavo; Eva Wilma; Sandra Bréa; Reginaldo Faria; Joana Fomm; Aracy Balabanian; Carlos Zara; Esther Góes; Maria Helena Dias; Marco Nanini; Mila Moreira; Herson Capri; Cristina Pereira; Christiane Torloni; Lauro Corona; Tássia Camargo; Mário Lago
- Opening theme: "Elas por Elas" by The Fevers
- Country of origin: Brazil
- Original language: Portuguese
- No. of episodes: 173

Production
- Running time: 45 minutes

Original release
- Network: Rede Globo
- Release: 10 May – 26 November 1982

Elas por Elas is a Brazilian telenovela created by Cassiano Gabus Mendes and directed by Paulo Ubiratan. It aired on Rede Globo from 10 May 1982 to 26 November 1982. The telenovela stars Eva Wilma, Sandra Bréa, Aracy Balabanian, Joana Fomm, Esther Goés, Mila Moreira and Maria Helena Dias.

== Cast ==
- Luiz Gustavo as Mário Cury "Mário Fofoca"
- Eva Wilma as Márcia Furtado Lopes Pereira
- Sandra Bréa as Wanda Lúcia Cury "Patinha"
- Joana Fomm as Natália Cardoso
- Aracy Balabanian as Helena Aranha Muniz
- Esther Góes as Adriana Ferraz
- Maria Helena Dias as Carmem Ferreira de Sousa
- Mila Moreira as Marlene Rozelli
- Carlos Zara as Jaime Muniz
- Reginaldo Faria as René de Sousa
- Marco Nanini as Décio
- Herson Capri as Carlos Cardoso / Ivo de Camargo
- Cristina Pereira as Ieda Furtado Lopes Pereira
- Christiane Torloni as Cláudia
- Lauro Corona as Gilberto Aranha Muniz "Gil"
- Tássia Camargo as Míriam Ferraz
- Mário Lago as Miguel Aranha
- Nathalia Timberg as Eva
- Laerte Morrone as Dr. Roberto
- Norma Blum as Marieta
- Ivan Cândido as Rubens de Sousa "Rubão"
- Felipe Carone as Evilásio Cury
- Ana Ariel as Raquel Cury
- Roberto Azevêdo as Amoroso
- Thaís de Campos as Cristina Furtado Lopes Pereira "Cris"
- Cássio Gabus Mendes as Elton Ferreira de Sousa
- Maria Cristina Nunes as Andressa
- Carlos Gregório as João Cássio "Juca"
- Ana Helena Berenger as Victória Ferreira de Sousa "Vic"
- André de Biase as Ivan Furtado Lopes Pereira
- Carmem Monegal as Maria
- Marcos Frota as Otávio
- Heloísa Millet as Suzane
- Lupe Gigliotti as Wilma Rozelli
- Paulo Gonçalves as Sílvio Rozelli
- Beatriz Lyra as Bia
- Jorge Cherques as Jurandir
