= Renato Côrte Real =

Brazilian actor (1924–1982)

Renato Côrte Real (October 6, 1924, Campinas - May 9, 1982, São Paulo) was a Brazilian comedian and actor. He was the father of actor Ricardo Côrte Real. He first came to prominence portraying the character of Epitácio on the television program Grande Show União from 1960 to 1964. For this part he won the Troféu Roquette Pinto award for Best Humorous TV Actor in 1963. He was a regular performer in sketch comedy segments on TV Globo's Satiricom in the 1970s. He also had roles on the Brazilian television programs Beto Rockfeller and Faça Humor, Não Faça Guerra among others.
