= Joelma 23º Andar =

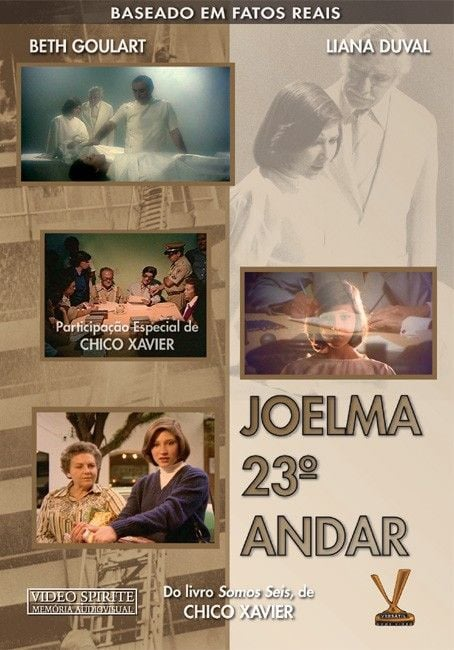
- Directed by: Clery Cunha
- Written by: Dulce Santucci
- Based on: Somos Seis, by Chico Xavier
- Starring: Beth Goulart; Liana Duval; Vilma Camargo; Chico Xavier; Ed Carlos
- Production company: Produções Cinematográficas Souza Lima
- Distributed by: Brasil Internacional Cinematográfica
- Release date: 12 April 1980
- Running time: 80 minutes
- Country: Brazil
- Language: Portuguese

Joelma 23º Andar is a 1980 Brazilian docudrama film directed by Clery Cunha, written by Dulce Santucci, and starring Beth Goulart. The film is based on the work Somos Seis by Chico Xavier, which consists of six stories derived from psychographed letters. Two of the letters are purportedly from young victims of the Joelma Building fire, which took place in São Paulo on February 1, 1974. It is considered Brazil's first spiritist-themed film.

== Plot ==
Lucimar is a mystical young woman who works in one of the offices of the Joelma Building in São Paulo. Her brother Alfredo also works in the same building. Both are children of Lucinda, a widow who moved to the capital in search of better days. On February 1st, 1974, the great fire that claimed hundreds of lives breaks out, including Lucimar's. At the moment of the tragedy, she strives to remain calm and help others escape. Desperate people leap from the burning building. All resources are mobilized, and hours later, the fire is brought under control.

Alfredo manages to locate his sister's body, but fearing to give the news directly to his mother, who has a heart condition, he takes Lucinda to a clinic to tell her everything there. On the way, she has a vision of Lucimar, who tells her that she is dead—a fact Alfredo confirms. Months pass, and Lucinda continues to think about her daughter. Advised by friends, she seeks out the medium Chico Xavier—of whom Lucimar was an avid reader—and he psychographs a message from the young woman. In it, Lucimar says that "another world of peace awaits those who suffer here."

== Cast ==
- Beth Goulart as Lucimar
- Liana Duval as Lucinda
- Vilma Camargo
- Ugo Canessa
- Ed Carlos
- Oswaldo Cirillo
- Henrique Verona Cristófani
- Marly de Fátima
- Valdemar de Lima
- Ivo de Oliveira
- Thiago Fabris
- Paulo Farah
- João Abraão Felício
- Maria Ferreira
- Márcia Fraga
- Lilian Gonçalves
- Castor Guerra
- Ruy Leal
- Landa Lopes
- Carlos Marques
- Paulo Mustafá
- Antônio Pettan
- Daniele Rodrigues
- Lourenço Luís Sanches
- Oricema Silveira
- Malu Stein
- Alvamar Taddei
- Chico Xavier as himself

== Production ==
At the time of the film's production, director Clery Cunha was already known for having worked in the Boca do Lixo film district since the 1960s. Previously, he had directed the dramas Os Desclassificados (1972) and A Pequena Órfã (1973), as well as the pornochanchada Pensionato de Mulheres (1974). The film is one of the rare productions from Boca do Lixo that did not include erotic scenes.

Joelma 23º Andar was partially filmed around the actual building in 1979, shortly after its extensive renovation, but permission to film inside was not granted. Consequently, the interior scenes were shot in a three-story building of a deactivated factory in the Tatuapé neighborhood of São Paulo. Members of the film crew reported supernatural occurrences during the shoot, such as mysterious noises, spotlights falling for no apparent reason, and an image of a shadow in a photograph that some believe to be the spirit of a woman who died in the fire.

At the time of the film's release, the owners of the Joelma Building (renamed the Edifício Praça da Bandeira) attempted to block the film's distribution. They argued that the filmmakers were sensationalizing the personal tragedy of the victims and harming their business interests.

== Reception ==
The reception at the film's premiere was limited: few critics wrote about it, and those who did were not particularly favorable toward the production. On April 10, 1980, for example, Miguel Pereira, writing for the Rio de Janeiro newspaper O Globo, stated that Joelma 23º Andar was "shallow, poorly executed, obvious, and redundant"—a sentiment echoed by other critics who gave any attention to Cunha's film.

Researcher Eduardo Cesar Soares stated on the website Revista Arte Brasileira that "the film's message is wonderful. Although it is theoretically a 'spiritist' film, it shows us that we all have our destinies intertwined, regardless of who we are, our profession, religion, or matters of gender and race. In a way, it encourages us to strive to be better people every day, learning from our mistakes and from society."
