= Os Trombadinhas =

- Theatrical release poster
- Directed by: Anselmo Duarte
- Screenplay by: Anselmo Duarte; Carlos Heitor Cony; Pelé
- Starring: Pelé; Paulo Villaça; Paulo Goulart
- Production companies: Newton Rique Empreendimentos S.A. Produções Cinematográficas R. F. Farias Ltda.
- Distributed by: Embrafilme; Ipanema Filmes
- Release date: 18 February 1980
- Running time: 92 minutes
- Country: Brazil
- Language: Portuguese

Os Trombadinhas (lit. 'The Pickpockets') is a 1980 Brazilian crime adventure film directed by Anselmo Duarte. The screenplay was written by Carlos Heitor Cony and Pelé, who also starred as the protagonist. The film features Pelé as a Santos FC youth coach who temporarily joins the police to investigate a ring of juvenile thieves in downtown São Paulo, uncovering their exploitation by adult criminals.

== Synopsis ==
The plight of abandoned minors in São Paulo—particularly young pickpockets—draws the attention of a prominent businessman after he witnesses a boy assaulting a woman in the bustling heart of the metropolis. Moved by this encounter, he resolves to leverage his influence to address the dire circumstances facing these marginalized youths. Seeking a viable solution, the businessman enlists the support of Pelé, a respected youth team coach at Santos Futebol Clube, to collaborate on initiatives aimed at improving the living conditions of at-risk children.

== Cast ==
- Pelé as himself
- Paulo Villaça as Detective Bira
- Paulo Goulart as Frederico
- Ana Maria Nascimento e Silva as Arlete
- Sérgio Hingst as Manteiga
- Neuza Amaral as Leila
- Raul Cortez as Judge
- Tony Card as Gibi
- Francisco Di Franco as Renato
- Kátia D'Ângelo as Ana Maria
- Netto Oliveira as Darcy
- David Hungaro as Police Chief
- Marcos Antônio da Silva Gomes as Tião
- Paulo Duarte as Street Urchin

== Reception ==
In a review published on April 8, 2025, journalist and broadcaster Marcos Lauro stated that "technically, the film is subpar. It carries the aesthetic of pornochanchada — a wildly popular genre at the time — but without the raunchy elements. The editing is jarring, and some scenes are excessively dark. On the flip side, it features a chase sequence complete with explosions — likely where most of the budget went, incidentally." He also noted that "the dialogue often veers into pamphlet-like rhetoric, particularly when Pelé speaks about Brazil's systemic issues affecting children. Yet the film's earnest intent makes you overlook these flaws. Pelé, frequently criticized for avoiding political stances, here delivers an entire film about politics — about how a wealthy nation abandons its youth, denies them opportunities, and ultimately pushes many toward crime."

Lauro concluded: "Os Trombadinhas transcends its status as a viral meme. It's a manifesto, an indictment of the country's failures. Its technical shortcomings pale in comparison to the power of its message."

== Legacy ==
In one scene from the film, Arlete, one of the criminals who exploits the juvenile thieves, asks Pelé, "You, are you Pelé?" to which Pelé replies, "No. I'm Jô Soares, you bitch!" The scene became an internet meme in Brazil. In an interview with Programa do Jô, Pelé stated that his intention was to surprise Jô Soares.
