= Nicette Bruno =

Brazilian actress (1933–2020)

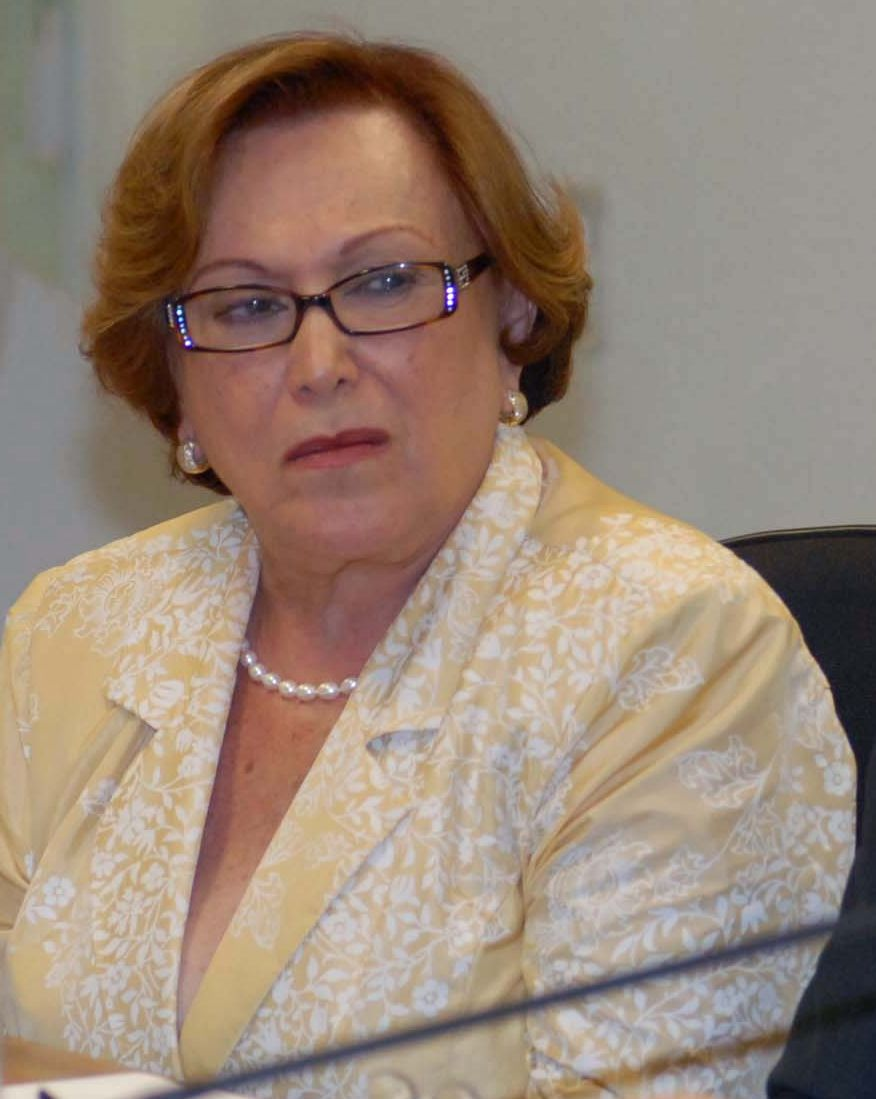
- Bruno in 2008
- Born: Nicette Bruno Xavier; 7 January 1933; Niterói, Rio de Janeiro, Brazil
- Died: 20 December 2020 (aged 87); Rio de Janeiro, Brazil
- Occupation: Actress
- Years active: 1945–2020
- Spouse: Paulo Goulart (m. 1958; died 2014)
- Children: 3 (including Beth)

Nicette Bruno Miessa (née Xavier; 7 January 1933 – 20 December 2020), known professionally as Nicette Bruno, was a Brazilian actress.

== Personal life ==
Nicette Bruno Xavier was born in Niterói, the daughter of Eleonor (Bruno) and Sinésio Campos Xavier. She was married to actor Paulo Goulart (né Miessa) from 1958 until his death in 2014. She adopted her mother's maiden name, Bruno, professionally.

Nicette Bruno died on 20 December 2020 of complications from COVID-19 during the COVID-19 pandemic in Brazil, aged 87.

== Filmography ==
=== Film ===
Year	Title	Role	Notes
1947	Querida Susana		
1952	O Canto da Saudade	Herself	
1953	Esquina da Ilusão	Iracema	
1972	A Marcha	Lucila	
1998	Vila Isabel		
1999	Zoando na TV	Mrs. Xênia	
2002	Que sera, sera	Old lady	
2008	A Guerra dos Rocha	Dinorá "Nonô" França	
2010	A Casa das Horas	Mrs. Celeste	
2016	Doidas e Santas	Elda	
2018	O Avental Rosa	Mrs. Tereza	

=== Television ===
Year	Title	Role	Notes
1952	A Corda		Teletheatre
1952–1959	Grande Teatro Tupi	Tessa	Teletheatre; 7 episodes
1953	Teatro Nicete Bruno		Teletheatre
1958	Suspeita		Teletheatre
1959–1963	Dona Jandira em Busca da Felicidade	Jandira	TV series; main role
1967–1968	Os Fantoches	Estela	Telenovela
1968–1969	A Muralha	Margarida Olinto	Telenovela
1968–1969	Legião dos Esquecidos		Telenovela
1969–1970	Sangue do Meu Sangue	Clara Resende	Telenovela
1970	A Gordinha	Mônica Becker	Telenovela
1970–1971	Meu Pé de Laranja Lima	Cecília	Telenovela
1971–1972	A Fábrica	Leonor	Telenovela
1972	Signo da Esperança	Luísa	Telenovela
1972–1973	Camomila e Bem-me-quer	Margarida "Margot"	Telenovela
1973	Rosa dos Ventos	Mother Maria das Neves	Telenovela
1973–1974	As Divinas... e Maravilhosas	Helena	Telenovela
1976–1977	Papai Coração	Sílvia	Telenovela
1977	Éramos Seis	Mrs. Lola	Telenovela
1978–1979	Salário Mínimo	Mrs. Zilda	Telenovela
1979–1980	Como Salvar Meu Casamento	Isadora "Dorinha"	Telenovela
1981	Obrigado, Doutor	Sister Júlia	TV series; main role
1982	Sétimo Sentido	Sara Mendes	Telenovela
1983	Louco Amor	Isolda Becker	Telenovela
1984	Meu Destino É Pecar	Mrs. Clara Castro	Miniseries
1985	Tenda dos Milagres	Joana	Miniseries
1986	Selva de Pedra	Fanny Marlene	Telenovela
1987	Helena	Marília	Telenovela; guest
1988–1989	Bebê a Bordo	Branca Ladeira	Telenovela
1990	Rainha da Sucata	Neiva Matias Pereira	Telenovela
1992	Perigosas Peruas	Vivian Bergman	Telenovela
1993	Mulheres de Areia	Julieta "Juju" Sampaio	Telenovela
1994	Incidente em Antares	Lanja Vacariano	Miniseries; guest
1995	A Próxima Vítima	Antonina "Nina" Giovanni	Telenovela
1995	Engraçadinha: Seus Amores e Seus Pecados	Aunt Zezé	Miniseries
1997	O Amor Está no Ar	Úrsula Souza Carvalho Uchoa	Telenovela
1998	Sai de Baixo	Ivone	TV series; guest
1998	Labirinto	Edite Meireles	Miniseries
1999	O Belo e as Feras	Eleonora	TV series; 1 episode
1999	Andando nas Nuvens	Judite Mota	Telenovela
2000	Você Decide	Zélia	TV series; 1 episode
2000	Aquarela do Brasil	Glória	Miniseries
2000	Brava Gente	Benona	TV series; 1 episode
2001–2004	Sítio do Picapau Amarelo	Dona Benta	TV series; main role (seasons 1–4)
2005–2006	Alma Gêmea	Ofélia Santini	Telenovela
2006	O Profeta	Aunt Cleide	Telenovela; 1 episode
2006	A Diarista	Jane	TV series; 1 episode
2007–2008	Sete Pecados	Julieta "Juju" Verona	Telenovela
2008	Dicas de um Sedutor	Rosa	TV series; 1 episode
2008	Nada Fofa	Mrs. Nice	Television film
2010–2011	Ti Ti Ti	Júlia Spina	Telenovela
2011–2012	A Vida da Gente	Iná Ribeiro	Telenovela
2012	As Brasileiras	Isaura	TV series; 1 episode
2012–2013	Salve Jorge	Leonor Flores Galvão	Telenovela
2013–2014	Joia Rara	Santa Maria "Santinha" Vidal	Telenovela
2015	I Love Paraisópolis	Izabel Maria "Izabelita" Marins de Albuquerque	Telenovela
2017–2018	Pega Pega	Elza Mendes da Silva	Telenovela
2018	Malhação: Vidas Brasileiras	Estela Santos	Soap opera; guest
2019	Órfãos da Terra	Ester Blum	Telenovela
2020	Éramos Seis	Mother Joana	Telenovela; 3 episodes
