= Beto Rockfeller =

- Created by: Cassiano Gabus Mendes
- Directed by: Lima Duarte; Wálter Avancini
- Starring: Luiz Gustavo
- Country of origin: Brazil
- Original language: Portuguese

Original release
- Network: Rede Tupi
- Release: November 4, 1968 – November 30, 1969

Beto Rockfeller is a Brazilian telenovela produced by TV Tupi and aired from November 4, 1968, to November 30, 1969. It was created by Cassiano Gabus Mendes, written by Bráulio Pedroso and directed by Lima Duarte and Walter Avancini.

== Plot ==
Beto Rockfeller (played by Luiz Gustavo) is a charming, lower middle class shoes salesman who cons people into believing he is a millionaire by mixing himself with members of the high society of São Paulo.

== Cast ==
- Luis Gustavo - Beto Rockfeller
- Bete Mendes - Renata
- Débora Duarte - Lu
- Ana Rosa - Cida
- Irene Ravache - Neide
- Walter Forster - Otávio
- Plínio Marcos - Vitório
- Maria Della Costa - Maitê
- Marília Pêra - Manuela
- Rodrigo Santiago - Carlucho
- Yara Lins - Clô
- Joffre Soares - Pedro
- Eleonor Bruno - Rosa
- Walderez de Barros - Mercedes
- Ruy Rezende - Saldanha
- Wladimir Nikolaief - Lavito
- Heleno Prestes - Tavinho
- Pepita Rodrigues - Bárbara
- Marilda Pedroso - Mila
- Renato Corte Real - Bertolo
- Etty Fraser - madame Waleska
- Alceu Nunez - Polidoro
- Luís Ameríco - Tomás
- Ester Mellingher - Tânia
- Gésio Amadeu - Gésio
- Zezé Motta - Zezé
- Jayme Barcellos - Fernando
- Lourdes Moraes - Magda
- Luísa Di Franco - Bia
- Lima Duarte - Domingos / Duarte / Conde Vladimir / Secundino
- Felipe Donavan - Delegado Moreno
- Dias Barreto - Secundino / Domingos
- João Carlos "Midnight" - Vadeco
- Theo De Faria - Lavinho
- Francisco Trentini - Canuto
- Othon Bastos

== Relevance ==
Beto Rockfeller is often mentioned as a turning point for the telenovela format in Brazil. It abandoned the melodramatic, artificial tone of previous shows for a more naturalistic approach, with the presence of a morally ambiguous protagonist and the use of colloquial language; characters would often mention actual news and gossips of the time. It also was the first telenovela to use contemporary pop hit songs in its soundtrack, rather than purely orchestral music.

== Movie ==
The telenovela was adapted into a 1970 motion picture directed by Olivier Perroy, with the main cast of the TV show.

== Sequel ==
A Volta de Beto Rockfeller, a sequel, was aired from March 26, 1973, to November 9, 1973. It was not as successful as the original telenovela; yet it is noteworthy as Tupi's first telenovela produced in color.
