= Vera Zimmermann =

Brazilian actress

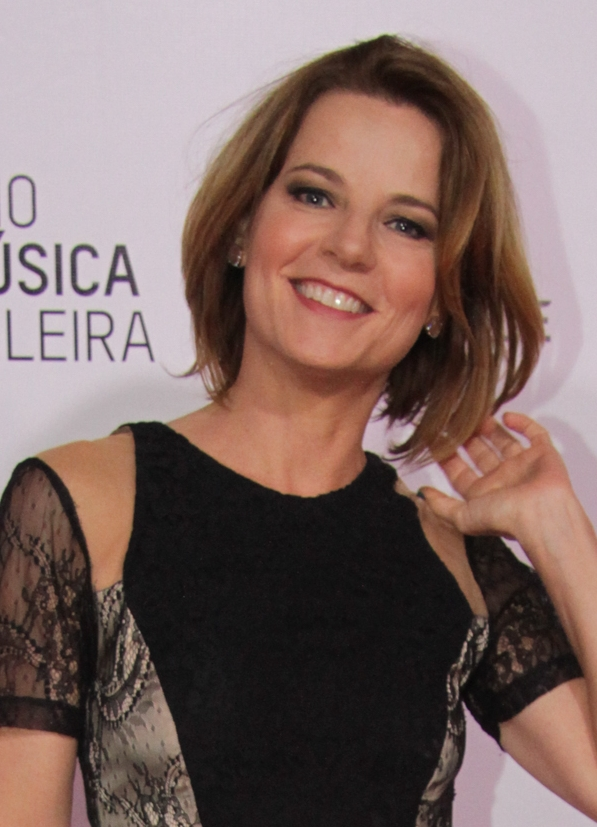
- Vera in 2015, at the ceremony of delivery of the 26th Prêmio da Música Brasileira
- Born: Vera Alice Santos Zimmermann; São Paulo, SP, Brazil
- Occupation: Actress

Vera Alice Santos Zimmermann is a Brazilian actress with roles in film, theater, and television. She is known for her role in the 1999 movie Ela Perdoa.

== Career ==
In 1982, Zimmermann made her professional stage debut in Eterno Retorno under the direction of Antunes Filho. She later appeared in the 1984 production of Macunaíma, written by Nelson Rodrigues, launching her career in São Paulo theatre.

In 2015, Zimmermann joined RecordTV, where she portrayed Princess Henutmire in the historical drama Os Dez Mandamentos. Two years afterwards, in 2017, she appeared as Queen Neusta in the series O Rico e Lázaro.

== Public discussion ==
In 2005, Zimmermann was featured on the cover of Época magazine with the headline "I Had an Abortion," where she publicly discussed her decision to terminate a pregnancy at the age of 25. The cover prompted extensive media discussion. It received the Esso Journalism Award for its design work.

Some commentators have speculated that Caetano Veloso’s song ‘Vera Gata’ was inspired by Zimmermann.

== Filmography ==
=== Television ===
Year	Title	Role	Notes
1988	Vida Nova	Marta	
1990	Desejo	Joaquina	
1990	Meu Bem, Meu Mal	Magda (Divina Magda)	
1991	Vamp	Marina Arantes	
1993	Contos de Verão	Glorinha	
1993	Você Decide		Episode: "A Barganha"
1996	Razão de Viver	Sílvia	
1996	Dona Anja	Adelaide	
1998	Estrela de Fogo	Andréa Gomes de Oliveira	
1999	Malhação	Rachel	Season 5
2000	Sãos e Salvos!	Carlinha	
2001	O Direito de Nascer	Cecília Moraes	
2002	Marisol	Sandra Queiroz	
2003	Jamais Te Esquecerei	Açucena Maria de Melo	
2006	O Profeta	Ester de Oliveira Nogueira	
2007	Dance Dance Dance	Teacher Marta Bernstein	
2008	Negócio da China	Joelma Bertazzi	
2009	Malhação ID	Cissa Melo Oliveira	Season 17
2010	Ti Ti Ti	Divina Magda	Special participation
2011	O Astro	Nádia Cury Hayalla	
2012	Gabriela	Conceição Bastos	
2013	Amor à Vida	Simone Maia Benitez	
2015	Os Dez Mandamentos	Princess Henutmire	
2017	Rota de Fuga	Lawyer	TV movie
2017	O Rico e Lázaro	Queen Neusta	

=== Films ===
- 1983 - Onda Nova as Vera
- 1984 - A Estrela Nua
- 1985 - Os Bons Tempos Voltaram: Vamos Gozar Outra Vez
- 1990 - Atração Satânica
- 1994 - O Efeito Ilha
- 1997 - Mangueira - Amor à Primeira Vista
- 1999 - Ela Perdoa
- 1999 - Mário
- 1999 - Amor que Fica
- 2000 - Tônica Dominante
- 2000 - Deus Jr.
- 2002 - Joana e Marcelo, Amor (Quase) Perfeito
- 2005 - Perdidos (short film)
- 2007 - Páginas de Menina (short film)
- 2016 - The Ten Commandments: The Movie
- 2020 - A menina que matou os pais as Marisia von Richthofen
- 2020 - O menino que matou meus pais as Marisia von Richthofen
