= Bete Mendes =

Brazilian actress and politician

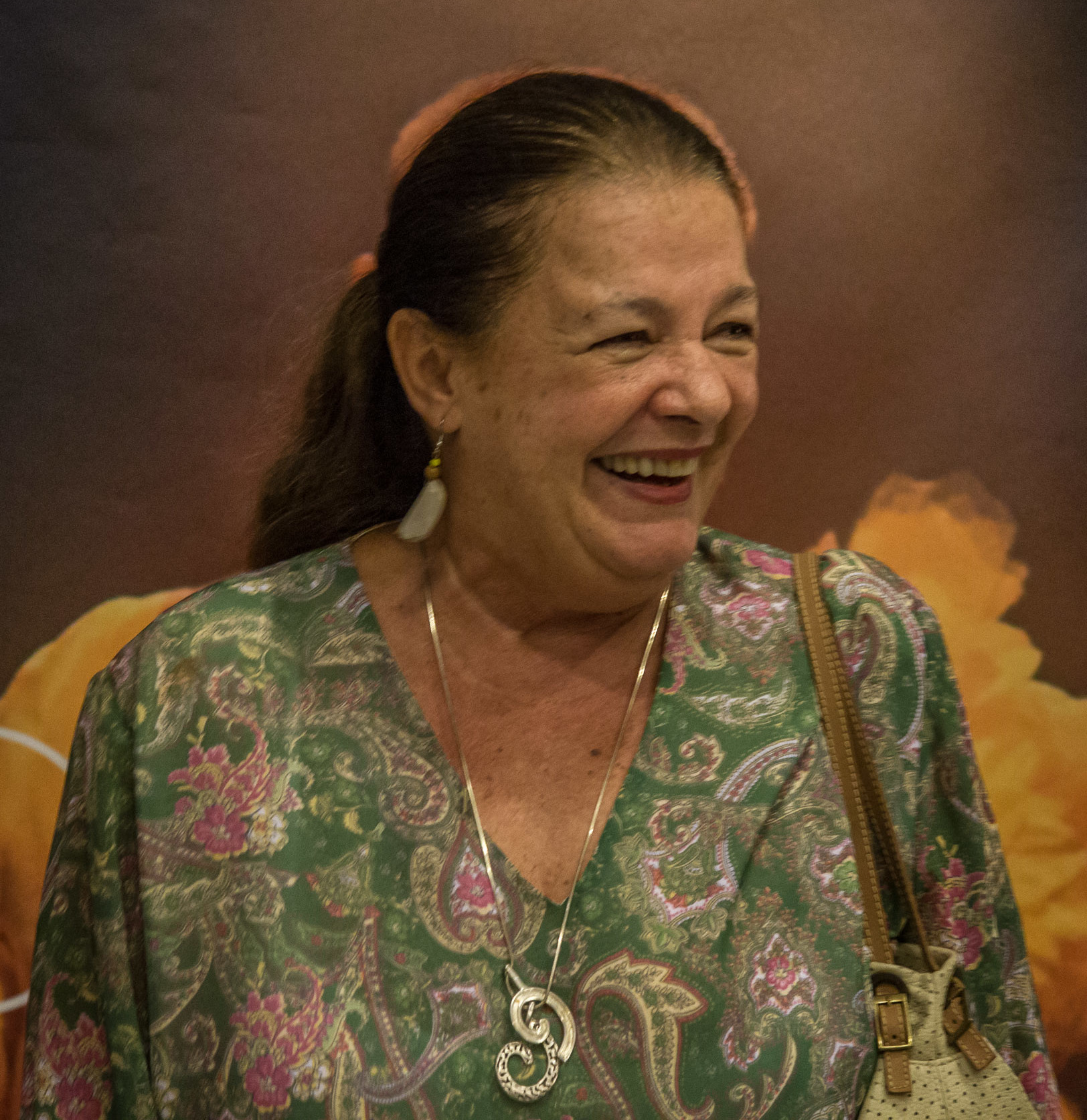
- Mendes in 2017

Member of the Chamber of Deputies
- In office 1 February 1983 – 1 February 1991
- Constituency: São Paulo

State Secretary of Culture of São Paulo
- In office 15 March 1987 – 21 December 1988
- Governor: Orestes Quércia
- Preceded by: Jorge da Cunha Lima
- Succeeded by: Fernando Morais
- Born: Elizabeth Mendes de Oliveira; 11 May 1949 (age 77); Santos, São Paulo, Brazil
- Education: University of São Paulo (BA)
- Occupations: Actress, politician
- Years active: 1966–present
- Political party: PT (1980–1985); PMDB (1985–1999)
- Spouses: Dennis Carvalho (m. 1970; sep. 1975) Antônio Carlos de Oliveira (divorced): Marco Antônio Fernandes

Bete Mendes (born Elizabeth Mendes de Oliveira; 11 May 1949) is a Brazilian actress and politician.

== Biography ==
=== Early life ===
Bete Mendes was born Elizabeth Mendes de Oliveira in Santos, São Paulo. She is the daughter of Osmar Pires de Oliveira, a Sub-Lieutenant of the Brazilian Air Force, and Maria Mendes de Oliveira. She acted in school plays since she was 5.

However, her artistic career really began at age 15, in her hometown of Santos, in the role of bunny Naná in the play A Árvore que Andava, by Oscar Von Phull.

Mendes has a degree in performing arts by the University of São Paulo (USP), and was pursuing a degree in Sociology when she was arrested by the political police of the military dictatorship.

She performed by the first time in theatre with the play A Cozinha (The kitchen) on 1968. At that same year, she had a prominent role in the popular TV Tupi soap opera Beto Rockfeller.

=== Arrest ===
On 1970, Mendes was arrested by the DOI-CODI, being held as prisoner for four years. Between September and October 1974, she was once again detained, this time being tortured. She was acquitted by the Superior Tribunal Militar (Superior Military Court), being released after spending 30 days in prison. Upon her release, she decided to quit the Sociology School.

=== Political career ===
Mendes actively participated in several social movements, such as for the professional regulation of artists (achieved in 1978) and the movement for the amnesty. She supported the strikes of metalworkers in the ABC Region, where she became familiar with Luiz Inácio Lula da Silva, then a growing figure in the Brazilian political scene. Along with Lula, Mendes was one of the founding members of the Workers' Party, by which she was elected Congresswoman for the 1983-87 term.

On 15 January 1985, Mendes was expelled from the Workers' Party for having voted, in the Electoral college (indirect election system), for Tancredo Neves as President. She was re-elected for the Congress by the Brazilian Democratic Movement Party, but this time she was a member of the National Constituent Assembly. Mendes was also Secretary of Culture in the state of São Paulo between 15 March 1987 and 21 December 1988, and president of the Fundação de Artes do Estado do Rio de Janeiro (Arts Foundation of the State of Rio de Janeiro) in 1999.

=== Brilhante Ustra case ===
When exercising her second term as congresswoman, Mendes joined the entourage of President José Sarney on an official visit to Uruguay. On 17 August 1985, she discovered that among the officers of the Brazilian Embassy in Uruguay were Carlos Alberto Brilhante Ustra, the man who tortured her in prison.

== Filmography ==
=== Film ===
- 2006 - Brasília 18%
- 2004 - Vestido de Noiva
- 1981 - Eles Não Usam Black-tie
- 1980 - Insônia
- 1980 - J.S. Brown, o último herói
- 1979 - Os Amantes da Chuva
- 1974 - As Delícias da Vida
- 1968 - Sandra Sandra

=== Television ===
- 2024 - Garota do Momento as Arlete
- 2017 - Tempo de Amar as Irmã Imaculada
- 2013 - Flor do Caribe as Olívia Soares
- 2012 - Gabriela as Florzinha Reis
- 2011 - Insensato Coração as Zuleica Alencar
- 2009 - Caras e Bocas as Piedade Batista
- 2008 - Faça Sua História as Iracema
- 2008 - Casos e Acasos as Hilda
- 2007 - Sítio do Picapau Amarelo as Dona Benta
- 2006 - Páginas da Vida as Sister Natércia
- 2005 - América as Fátima
- 2004 - Seus Olhos sa Edite
- 2003 - A Casa das Sete Mulheres as Dona Ana Joaquina
- 2000 - Aquarela do Brasil as Olga
- 1999 - Terra Nostra as Ana Esplendore
- 1998 - Brida as Diva
- 1996 - O Rei do Gado as Donana
- 1994 - Pátria Minha as Zuleica
- 1994 - Memorial de Maria Moura as Maria Moura's mother
- 1994 - Quatro por Quatro as Fatima
- 1993 - O Mapa da Mina as Carmem Rocha
- 1992 - Anos Rebeldes as Carmem Damaceno
- 1990 - Lua Cheia de Amor as Emília
- 1989 - Tieta as Aída
- 1985 - O Tempo e o Vento as Maria Valéria Terra
- 1985 - De Quina pra Lua as Patrícia
- 1981 - Floradas na Serra as Elza
- 1980 - Dulcinéa Vai à Guerra as Jerusa
- 1980 - Pé de Vento as Terezinha
- 1978 - Sinal de Alerta as Vera
- 1977 - Sinhazinha Flô as Flor
- 1976 - O Casarão as Vânia
- 1975 - Bravo! as Lia di Lorenzo
- 1974 - O Rebu as Sílvia
- 1973 - Divinas & Maravilhosas as Carolina
- 1973 - A Volta de Beto Rockfeller as Renata
- 1972 - A Revolta dos Anjos as Stela
- 1972 - Na Idade do Lobo as Carina
- 1971 - Nossa Filha Gabriela as Catarina
- 1970 - O Meu Pé de Laranja Lima as Godóia
- 1970 - Simplesmente Maria as Angélica
- 1969 - Super Plá as Titina
- 1968 - Beto Rockfeller as Renata
- 1966 - Águias de Fogo
