= Otávio Gabus Mendes =

Brazilian film critic, radio broadcaster and director

Otávio Gabus Mendes (born Octavio Gabus Mendes; 1906–1946), was Brazilian film critic, radio broadcaster, screenwriter and director. He was father of radio broadcaster Edith Gabus Mendes, and actor Cassiano Gabus Mendes, and grandfather of actors Tato Gabus Mendes and Cássio Gabus Mendes.

Gabus Mendes started his career as a film critic writing for Paratodos and Cinearte in 1925 and 1926 respectively. He then wrote and directed As Armas (1930) and Mulher (1931), directed and acted on Onde a Terra Acaba (1933), and wrote the screenplay for Ganga Bruta (1933).
