= O Astro (2011 TV series) =

2011 Brazilian telenovela

- Created by: Alcides Nogueira; Geraldo Carneiro based on the work by Janete Clair
- Based on: O Astro by Janete Clair
- Directed by: Mauro Mendonça Filho
- Starring: Rodrigo Lombardi; Carolina Ferraz; Thiago Fragoso; Regina Duarte; Alinne Moraes; Daniel Filho; Marco Ricca; Humberto Martins; Henri Castelli; Antônio Calloni; Rosamaria Murtinho; Francisco Cuoco
- Opening theme: Bijuterias by João Bosco
- Country of origin: Brazil
- Original language: Portuguese
- No. of episodes: 64

Production
- Running time: 40 minutes (Tuesday, Wednesday and Friday); 15-20 minutes (Thursday)

Original release
- Network: TV Globo
- Release: 12 July – 28 October 2011

O Astro (English: The Illusionist) is a Brazilian telenovela produced and broadcast by TV Globo. It was broadcast from July 12, 2011, to October 28, 2011, with 64 episodes.

Starring Rodrigo Lombardi, Carolina Ferraz, Regina Duarte, Marco Ricca, Thiago Fragoso, Alinne Moraes, Humberto Martins, Daniel Filho, Henri Castelli, Antônio Calloni, Rosamaria Murtinho and Francisco Cuoco

In 2012, the show won the International Emmy Award for Best Telenovela at the 40th International Emmy Awards.

== Cast ==
- Rodrigo Lombardi as Herculano Quintanilha (Professor Astro)
- Carolina Ferraz as Amanda Mello Assunção Quintanilha
- Thiago Fragoso as Márcio Hayalla
- Alinne Moraes as Lili (Lilian Paranhos Hayalla)
- Fernanda Rodrigues as Josephine "Jôse" Mello Assunção
- Daniel Filho as Salomão Hayalla
- Regina Duarte as Clô (Clotilde Magalhães Sampaio Hayalla)
- Marco Ricca as Samir Hayalla
- Humberto Martins as Neco (Ernesto Ramires de Oliveira)
- Juliana Paes as Nina Moratti
- Henri Castelli as Felipe Cerqueira
- Guilhermina Guinle as Beatriz Schneider
- Rosamaria Murtinho as Tia Magda (Magda Sampaio Magalhães)
- Simone Soares as Laura Paranhos de Oliveira
- Antônio Calloni as Natalino "Natal" Pimentel
- Tato Gabus Mendes as Amin Hayalla
- Vera Zimmermann as Nádia Cury Hayalla
- Carolina Kasting as Jamile Hayalla
- Daniel Dantas as Inspetor Eustáquio Novaes
- Reginaldo Faria as Adolfo Mello Assunção
- Mila Moreira as Miriam Lambert Peranhos Mello Assunção
- José Rubens Chachá as Youssef Hayalla
- Bel Kutner as Sílvia
- Selma Egrei as Consolação Paranhos
- Ellen Rocche as Valéria dos Santos
- Celso Frateschi as Nelson Cerqueira
- Sérgio Mamberti as Padre Laurindo
- Pascoal da Conceição as Inácio
- João Baldasserini as Henri Sorei
- Frank Menezes as Cleiton
- Bernardo Marinho as Alan Quintanilha
- Luca de Castro as Joaquim
- Maria Pompeu as Dalva
- Marcela Muniz as Doralice
- Rodrigo Mendonça as Ubiraci
- Izak Dahora as Dimas dos Santos
- Lara Rodrigues as Lurdes "Lurdinha" Gusmão
- Natália Souto as Das Dores (Maria das Dores Ferreira)
- Jefferson Goulart as Aminzinho (Amin Hayalla Filho)
- Hanna Romanazzi as Luísa Belucci
- Luiz Magnelli as Galego
- Tuna Dwek as Nilza
- Carolina Chalitta as Tânia
- Mariana Bassoul as Carmem
- Rafael Losso as Olavo
- Úrsula Corona as Elizabeth
- Rafael Primot as Artur
- Pablo Sanábio as Pablo Banderas
- Jonas Mello as Dr. Alberico
- Francisco Cuoco as Ferragus
