= Os Amadores =

- Genre: Comedy
- Created by: Mauro Wilson
- Directed by: José Alvarenga Jr.
- Country of origin: Brazil
- Original language: Portuguese
- No. of seasons: 3

Original release
- Network: Rede Globo
- Release: 27 December 2005 – 21 December 2007

Os Amadores is a Brazilian television series created by Mauro Wilson.

== Plot ==
Os Amadores is a dramatic comedy, in which four men in their 40s, who have never seen each other before, have a clinical death declared in the ICU of a hospital, where they have stopped for different reasons. They are able to return to life, and start a friendship. Guided by the attempt to make their second lives a happier experience, the four friends decide to unite and help each other in solving their problems.

== Cast ==
- Murilo Benício ... Guilherme Ferreira
- Matheus Nachtergaele ... Jaime
- Otávio Müller ... Tadeu
- Cássio Gabus Mendes ... Marquinhos
- Marly Bueno ... Necilda

== Awards ==
Os Amadores was twice nominated to International Emmy Awards.

Year	Awards	Category	Result
2006	34th International Emmy Awards	Best Comedy	Nominated
2007	35th International Emmy Awards	Best Comedy	Nominated
