= Murder in Rio =

1963 film directed by Horst Hächler

- Directed by: Horst Hächler
- Written by: Rupert Larsen; Gerhard Overhoff
- Produced by: Sandi Adaniu; Alfredo Cohen; Gunther Schade; Ernst R. von Theumer
- Starring: Erika Remberg; Hellmut Lange; Gustavo Rojo
- Cinematography: Kurt Hasse
- Edited by: Eckehard Franz; Werner Preuss
- Music by: Lothar Nakat
- Production company: Theumer Film
- Distributed by: Nora-Filmverleih
- Release date: 6 December 1963
- Running time: 95 minutes
- Countries: Brazil; West Germany
- Language: German

Murder in Rio (German: Mord in Rio) is a 1963 West German-Brazilian crime film directed by Horst Hächler and starring Erika Remberg, Hellmut Lange and Gustavo Rojo. The film's sets were designed by the art director Pierino Massenzi.

== Cast ==
- Erika Remberg as Barbara Leen
- Hellmut Lange as Peter Jordan
- Gustavo Rojo as Dumont
- Reinhard Kolldehoff as Harry
- Eva Wilma as Leila
- Hélio Souto as Juan
- Pedro Paulo Hatheyer as Kommissar Moura
- Kleber Afonso
- Xandó Batista
- Astrogildo Filho
- Pietro B. Filizola
- Marina Freire
- Geórgia Gomide
- Stanislaw Gravisluk
- Luis Gustavo
- Francisco Pereira
- Américo Taricano
- Ingrid Thomas

== Bibliography ==
- Anke Finger, Gabi Kathöfer & Christopher Larkosh. KulturConfusão – On German-Brazilian Interculturalities. Walter de Gruyter, 2015.
