= Cássio Gabus Mendes =

Brazilian actor (born 1961)

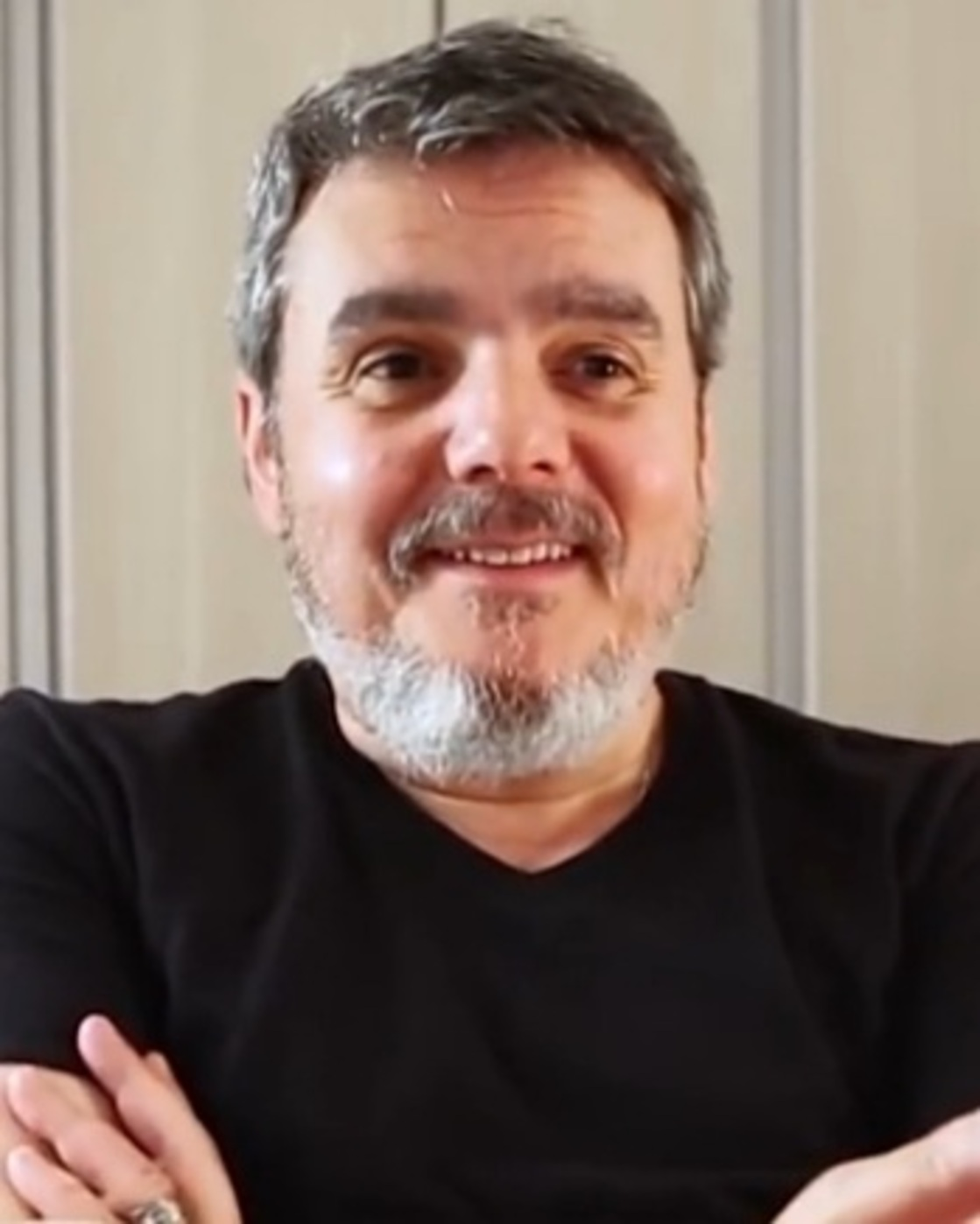
- Gabus Mendes in 2020
- Born: Cássio Gabus Mendes; 29 August 1961 (age 65); São Paulo, Brazil
- Occupation: Actor
- Years active: 1982–present
- Spouse: Lídia Brondi (m. 1991)
- Relatives: Tato Gabus Mendes (brother); Otávio Gabus Mendes (grandfather); Luis Gustavo (maternal uncle)

Cássio Gabus Mendes (born 29 August 1961) is a Brazilian actor.

== Career ==
Debuted on TV in the telenovela Elas por Elas, in 1982, and participated in the telenovelas Ti Ti Ti, Vale Tudo, Tieta and A Indomada, and others. He acted in the miniseries Anos Rebeldes, Mulher and O Quinto dos Infernos.

In cinema, he acted in Boleiros – Era Uma Vez o Futebol (1998) and Boleiros 2 – Vencedores e Vencidos (2006), both by Ugo Giorgetti. He was also cast in Orfeu (1999) by Carlos Diegues, Como Fazer um Filme de Amor (2004) by José Roberto Torero, and Trair e Coçar é Só Começar (2006) by Moacyr Góes, Baptism of Blood (2007) and Caixa Dois (2007).

Also in 2007, he participated in the miniseries Amazônia, de Galvez a Chico Mendes, portraying Chico Mendes, in the telenovela Desejo Proibido and in the special TV show Os Amadores.

In late 2008, seven months after the end of Desejo Proibido, he returned to TV in the telenovela Três Irmãs.

In 2009, the actor is also in theaters with the release of the film Se Eu Fosse Você 2, and participates in the TV show Norma with Denise Fraga.

In 2010, he participates in the TV series S.O.S. Emergência and As Cariocas, both on Rede Globo and in the film Chico Xavier.

In 2011, the actor was in the telenovela Insensato Coração, and in the movies Bruna Surfistinha and Federal Bank Heist.

In 2012, in the miniseries Dercy de Verdade, he portrays Valdemar, one of Dercy Gonçalves's affairs. He was also in the telenovela Lado a Lado.

Between 2013 and 2014, he was in the telenovela Além do Horizonte. In 2014, he is invited by Gilberto Braga to join the cast of Babilônia, portraying the contractor Evandro.

== Personal life ==
He is son of screenwriter, director, producer, sound designer, stage manager and author of telenovelas Cassiano Gabus Mendes. He is brother of actor Tato Gabus Mendes and married to former actress Lídia Brondi since 1990. He is São Paulo FC fan.

== Filmography ==
=== Television ===
Year	Title	Role	Notes
1982	Elas por Elas	Elton Ferreira	
1983	Pão Pão, Beijo Beijo	Francuccio Cantarelli (Franco)	
1983	Champagne	Gregório Brandão (Greg)	
1984	Livre para Voar	Eduardo (Edu)	
1985	Ti Ti Ti	Luís Otávio Azevedo Almeida (Luti)	
1986	Roda de Fogo	Celso Rezende Júnior	
1987	Brega & Chique	Bruno	
1988	Vale Tudo	Afonso de Almeida Roitman	
1989	Sampa	Amadeu	
1989	Tieta	Ricardo Esteves Batista (Cardo)	
1990	Meu Bem, Meu Mal	Eduardo José Gentil da Silva (Doca) / Eduardo Costabrava	
1992	Anos Rebeldes	João Alfredo Galvão	
1993	O Mapa da Mina	Rodrigo Simeone	
1994	Caso Especial		Episode: "Férias Sem Volta"
1994	Você Decide		Episode: "Em Família"
1994	Tropicaliente	Franchico	
1995	Decadência	Priest Giovani	
1995	Explode Coração	Edu / Vitor Salgado	
1996	Você Decide		Episode: "A Troca"
1996	A Vida Como Ela É	Various characters	8 episodes
1997	A Indomada	Sérgio Murilo dos Santos	
1998	Mulher	Afrânio	
1999	Terra Nostra	Clausewitz	Participation
2000	Você Decide	Heitor	Episode: "Golpe de Mestre"
2000	Você Decide		Episode: "Aluga-se Uma Aliança"
2001	Um Anjo Caiu do Céu	Paulo Matos (Paulinho) / Selmo de Windsor	
2001	Os Normais	Geraldinho	Episode: "Mal-entendido é Normal"
2001	Brava Gente	Gentil	Episode: "Um Caso, uma Loura"
2002	O Quinto dos Infernos	D. João VI (young)	Participation
2002	Desejos de Mulher	Renato Moreno	
2002	Sai de Baixo	Ari	Episode: "O Galo Sinistro"
2002	Os Normais	Lelo	Episode: "Parece Indecente, Mas é Normal"
2003	Sítio do Picapau Amarelo	Nicanor	Episode: "O Sumiço da Emília"
2003	A Diarista	Tiago	Special year-end
2004	Um Só Coração	Juvenal Penteado	
2004	Começar de Novo	Dr. Sidarta Gautama	
2005	Linha Direta	Colonel Job Lorena de Sant'Anna	Episode: "A Bomba do Riocentro"
2005	Os Amadores	Marquinhos	3 episodes (2005–2007)
2006	JK	Gaúcho	
2007	Amazônia, de Galvez a Chico Mendes	Chico Mendes	
2007	Desejo Proibido	Delegate Trajano Mendonça	
2008	Três Irmãs	Baby Montenegro	
2009	Norma	Cláudio	
2010	S.O.S. Emergência	Sérgio	Episode: "Tem Pai que é Cego"
2010	As Cariocas	Roberto	Episode: "A Suicida da Lapa"
2011	Chico Xavier	Priest Julio Maria	
2011	Insensato Coração	Klebber Damasceno	
2012	Dercy de Verdade	Valdemar Martins	
2012	Lado a Lado	Bonifácio Vieira	
2013	Além do Horizonte	Jorge Barcelos (Leader Jorge)	
2015	Babilônia	Evandro Souza Rangel	
2016	Justiça	Heitor Diniz	
2017	Segredos de Justiça	Estevão	Episode: "Mas Eu Amo Aquele Homem"
2017	Tempo de Amar	Reinaldo Macedo	
2019	Éramos Seis	Antônio	
2023	Elas por Elas	Otávio	
2026	A Nobreza do Amor	Colonel Casemiro Bonafé	

=== Films ===
- 1998 – Boleiros - Era uma Vez o Futebol... .... Zé Américo
- 1999 – Orfeu .... Pedro
- 2004 – Como Fazer um Filme de Amor .... Alan
- 2006 – Boleiros 2 – Vencedores e Vencidos .... Zé Américo
- 2006 – Trair e Coçar É Só Começar .... Eduardo
- 2007 – Baptism of Blood .... Delegado Fleury
- 2007 – Caixa Dois .... Romeiro
- 2009 – Se eu Fosse Você 2 .... Nelsinho
- 2009 – Cabeça a Prêmio
- 2010 – Chico Xavier .... Priest Julio Maria
- 2011 – Bruna Surfistinha .... Huldson
- 2011 – Assalto ao Banco Central .... Martinho
- 2014 – Confissões de Adolescente .... Paulo
- 2017 – Gosto Se Discute .... Augusto
