= Beth Goulart =

Brazilian actress, singer and playwright (born 1961)

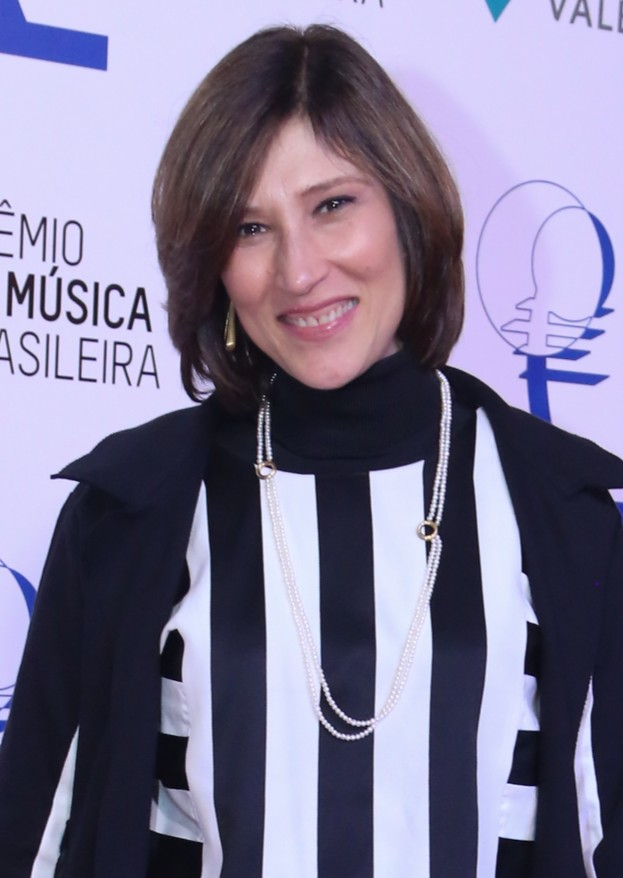
- Goulart in June 2015
- Born: Elisabeth Xavier Miessa; 25 January 1961 (age 65); Rio de Janeiro, Brazil
- Occupations: Actress; singer; playwright
- Years active: 1974–present
- Spouse: Nando Carneiro (m. 1983; div. 1988)
- Children: 1
- Parents: Paulo Goulart (father); Nicette Bruno (mother)
- Website: www.bethgoulart.com.br

Elisabeth Xavier Miessa (born 25 January 1961) is a Brazilian actress, singer and playwright.

== Biography ==
Her first appearance on television was in teleteatro Alô, Alguém aí?, William Saroyan, aired by TV Cultura in 1975. She debuted as an actress in the soap opera Papai Coração in 1976 TV Tupi.

In 1983, she studied singing with Pepê Castro Neves and lyrical singing and reading music, with Luis Carlos Brito. Two years later, she studied art with Peter Brook.

In 1989, with Kika Sampaio she studied tap dance with Ruth Rachou and Val Folly and lyrical singing with Marga Nicolau.

In 1983, Beth married musician Nando Carneiro, who had a son. Separated in 1988, Beth was also involved with director Gerald Thomas, who staged the play Elektra Com Creta in 1986.

The actress is Kardecist since childhood, religion conveyed by a parent.

== Career ==
=== Television ===
Television
Year	Title	Role	Notes
1976	Papai Coração	Sister Carolina	
1977	Éramos Seis	Lili	
1978	Roda de Fogo	Paula	
1978	O Direito de Nascer	Isabel Cristina	
1979	Como Salvar Meu Casamento	Sílvia	
1980	Marina	Fernanda	
1981	Baila Comigo	Débora Frey Gama	
1982	Sétimo Sentido	Helenice Rivoredo	
1983	Louco Amor	Carla	
1984	Marquesa de Santos	Benedita	
1986	Selva de Pedra	Cíntia Vilhena	
1987	O Outro	Marília Della Santa	
1988	O Primo Basílio	Leopoldina Quebrais de Noronha	
1988	Olho por Olho	Paula	
1990	Riacho Doce	Helena	
1992	Perigosas Peruas	Diana Torremolinos	
1993	O Mapa da Mina	Tânia Moraes	
1994	Você Decide		Episode: "A Bolsa ou a Vida"
1995	A Idade da Loba	Otília	
1996	O Campeão	Maria Isabel Caldeira	
1997	Malhação	Lígia	Season 3
2000	Você Decide	Laura	Episode: "A Volta"
2001	O Clone	Lidiane Valverde	
2002	O Beijo do Vampiro	Marie	Special participation
2004	A Diarista	Regina	Episode: "Valha-me Deus"
2005	A Lua Me Disse	Elvira Sá Marques	
2006	A Diarista	Dona Carminha	Episode: "Bolo da Discórdia"
2007	Paraíso Tropical	Neli Veloso Schneider	
2008	Desejo Proibido	Maria de Lourdes	Special participation
2008	Casos e Acasos	Sandra	Episode: "O Flagra, a Demissão e a Adoção"
2008	Três Irmãs	Leonora Malatesta	
2011	Vidas em Jogo	Regina Camargo Leal	
2014	Vitória	Clarice	
2016	A Terra Prometida	Leia	
2018	Jesus	Mirian	

=== Film ===
Film
Year	Title	Role
1975	Sorôco, Sua Mãe, Sua Filha	
1979	Joelma 23º Andar	Lucimar
1984	Meu Homem, Meu Amante	
1987	Eternamente Pagu	
1988	Mistério no Colégio Brasil	Zizi
1995	Carlota Joaquina - Princesa do Brazil	Maria Teresa, Princess of Beira
1999	Dois Córregos - Verdades Submersas no Tempo	Ana Paula
2000	A Hora Marcada	Gina
2001	Amores Possíveis	Maria
2002	Metade Sexo Metade Mussarela	
2003	Oswaldo Cruz - O Médico do Brasil	
2007	Canção de Baal	
2008	A Casa da Mãe Joana	Cliente

=== Theater ===
- 1986 - Elektra com Creta
- 2009-2010 - Simplesmente Eu, Clarice Lispector
