= Paulo Goulart =

Brazilian actor (1933–2014)

- Born: Paulo Afonso Miessa; 9 January 1933; Ribeirão Preto, São Paulo, Brazil
- Died: 13 March 2014 (aged 81); São Paulo, Brazil
- Occupation: Actor
- Years active: 1951–2013
- Spouse: Nicette Bruno (m. 1958)
- Children: 3 (including Beth)

Paulo Afonso Miessa, better known by his stage name Paulo Goulart (9 January 1933 – 13 March 2014) was a Brazilian actor.

== Family ==
He was married to Brazilian actress Nicette Bruno from 1958 until his death in 2014; the couple had three children. He was a member of the Spiritist community.

== Career ==
=== Film ===
- 1954: Destino em Apuros
- 1957: Rio Zona Norte .... Moacir
- 1958: O Cantor e o Milionário .... Paulo
- 1958: Cala a Boca, Etelvina .... Adelino
- 1958: Pista de Grama
- 1958: O Grande Momento .... Vitório
- 1958: O Barbeiro Que Se Vira .... Leonardo
- 1958: E o Bicho não Deu .... Delegado Faria
- 1960: E Eles não Voltaram
- 1962: Nordeste Sangrento
- 1972: A Marcha
- 1974: A Cobra Está Fumando
- 1979: Os Trombadinhas .... Frederico
- 1983: Gabriela .... João Fulgêncio
- 1984: Para Viver um Grande Amor .... Eugênio
- 1989: Kuarup
- 1989: Faca de Dois Gumes .... Delegado Olímpio Veloso
- 1989: Solidão, Uma Linda História de Amor
- 1998: Vila Isabel (Short)
- 2000: O Auto da Compadecida .... Major Antônio Moraes
- 2000: Soluços e Soluções
- 2004: Redentor .... Ministro
- 2005: Tapete Vermelho .... Caminhoneiro
- 2005: Xuxinha e Guto contra os Monstros do Espaço .... São Pedro (voice)
- 2010: Chico Xavier
- 2010: Luz nas Trevas: A Volta do Bandido da Luz Vermelha
- 2010: Astral City: A Spiritual Journey .... Ministro
- 2013: Giovanni Improtta .... Juiz Walcyr
- 2013: Time and the Wind .... Coronel Amaral Neto (final film role)

=== Television ===
- 1952: Helena
- 1966: Anjo Marcado (TV Excelsior) .... Dr. César Galvão
- 1966: As Minas de Prata (TV Excelsior) .... Dom Francisco
- 1967: Os Fantoches (TV Excelsior) .... Marcos
- 1968: O Terceiro Pecado (TV Excelsior) .... Clemente
- 1968: A Muralha (TV Excelsior) .... Bento Coutinho
- 1969: Vidas em Conflito (TV Excelsior) .... Walter
- 1969: A Cabana do Pai Tomás (Rede Globo) .... Pierre St. Clair
- 1970: Verão Vermelho (Rede Globo) .... Flávio
- 1970: A Próxima Atração (Rede Globo) .... Tomás
- 1971: Quarenta Anos Depois (Rede Record) .... Santiago
- 1972: Signo da Esperança (TV Tupi)
- 1972: Uma Rosa com Amor (Rede Globo) .... Claude Antoine Geraldi
- 1976: Um Sol Maior (TV Tupi) .... Rangel
- 1977: Éramos Seis (TV Tupi) .... Doutor Azevedo
- 1977: Papai Coração (TV Tupi) .... Mário
- 1979: Gaivotas (TV Tupi) .... Carlos
- 1980: Plumas e Paetês (Rede Globo) .... Gino
- 1981: Jogo da Vida (Rede Globo) .... Silas Ramos Cruz
- 1984: Transas e Caretas (Rede Globo) .... Roberto
- 1986: Roda de Fogo (Rede Globo) .... Marcos Labanca
- 1988: Chapadão do Bugre (mini-series - TV Bandeirantes) .... Capitão Eucaristo Rosa
- 1988: Fera Radical (Rede Globo) .... Altino Flores
- 1990: Gente Fina (Rede Globo) .... Joaquim
- 1991: O Dono do Mundo (Rede Globo) .... Altair
- 1992: Despedida de Solteiro (Rede Globo) .... delegado
- 1993: Mulheres de Areia (Rede Globo) .... Donato
- 1994: Incidente em Antares (mini-series - Rede Globo) .... Tibério Vacariano
- 1994: As Pupilas do Senhor Reitor (SBT) .... Dom Arlindo
- 1995: A Idade da Loba (TV Bandeirantes) .... Zé Rubens
- 1996: O Campeão (TV Bandeirantes) .... Felipe Caldeira
- 1997: Zazá (Rede Globo) .... Ulisses
- 1999: O Auto da Compadecida (mini-series) .... Major Antônio Moraes
- 2000: Aquarela do Brasil (mini-series) .... Gabriel Laguardia
- 2001: A Padroeira .... Dom Lourenço de Sá
- 2002: O Quinto dos Infernos (mini-series) .... José Bonifácio
- 2002: Esperança .... Farina
- 2003: Sítio do Picapau Amarelo .... Bartolomeu Bueno da Silva
- 2004: Um Só Coração (mini-series) .... Avelino
- 2004: O Pequeno Alquimista (special) .... Rei
- 2005 América .... Mariano de Oliveira
- 2006 JK (mini-series) .... Israel Pinheiro
- 2006 Pé na Jaca .... Vilela
- 2007 Amazônia, de Galvez a Chico Mendes (mini-series) .... Tavares
- 2007 Duas Caras .... Heriberto Gonçalves
- 2009 Cama de Gato .... Severo Tardivo
- 2011 Morde & Assopra .... Eliseu

=== Voice Acting ===
- Aslam - The Chronicles of Narnia: The Lion, the Witch and the Wardrobe (Brazilian Version)
