= Maria Adelaide Amaral =

Portuguese Brazilian playwright, screenwriter, and novelist

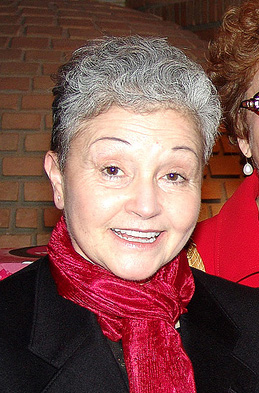
Maria Adelaide Amaral

Maria Adelaide Amaral (born 1 July 1942) is a Portuguese Brazilian playwright, screenwriter, and novelist. A good deal of her plays concern disaffected urban professionals. She has been classed as one of the two major women playwrights of Brazil, the other being Leilah Assunção.

In 1994, Maria Adelaide Amaral biographed the Brazilian comedian Dercy Gonçalves. The book was titled Dercy de Cabo a Rabo. In 2012, Amaral adapted this book into the miniseries Dercy de Verdade.

Despite her work as writer, she is perhaps best known to the public as an author of telenovelas, including the 2010 remake of Ti Ti Ti.
