= Meu Bem, Meu Mal =

- Genre: Telenovela
- Created by: Cassiano Gabus Mendes
- Starring: Lima Duarte; Sílvia Pfeifer; José Mayer; Yoná Magalhães; Cássio Gabus Mendes; Lídia Brondi; Marcos Paulo; Thales Pan Chacon; Luciana Braga; Lizandra Souto; Armando Bógus; Nívea Maria; Guilherme Karan; Adriana Esteves; Mylla Christie; Ariclê Perez; Fábio Assunção; Vera Zimmermann
- Opening theme: "Meu Bem, Meu Mal"
- Composer: Marcos André
- Country of origin: Brazil
- Original language: Portuguese
- No. of episodes: 173

Production
- Running time: 60 minutes

Original release
- Network: TV Globo
- Release: October 29, 1990 – May 18, 1991

Related
- Rainha da Sucata; O Dono do Mundo

Meu Bem, Meu Mal (My Good, My Evil in English) was a Brazilian telenovela produced by TV Globo, October 29, 1990 to May 18, 1991, in 173 episodes.

== Plot ==
The telenovela depicts Lázaro Venturini, majority shareholder of Venturini Designers, who is forced to live with Ricardo Miranda, who holds 30% stake in the company and had an affair with his late wife, Maria Helena. Ricardo also holds a secret affair with Isadora Venturini (also a shareholder), the widow of Claudius, son of Lázaro, and hated by the patriarch. Both Ricardo and Isadora are victims of others' hatred.

Ricardo was responsible for the ruin of Philip. His daughter, Patricia, plans revenge and becomes involved with Ricardo, even though much younger than he and a friend of his troubled daughter, Jessica.

Isadora joins socialite Mimi Toledo and her manicurist, Berenice. Toledo was in love with the late husband of Isadora. Berenice wants to avenge her daughter, Fernanda's, humiliation imposed by Isadora, who did not accept the girl as his son's girlfriend. Doca is a poor boy who infiltrates high society as Eduardo Costabrava, and is madly in love with Victoria, Isadora's daughter.

== Cast ==
Actor	Character
Lima Duarte	Dom Lázaro Venturini
Sílvia Pfeifer	Isadora Venturini
José Mayer	Ricardo Miranda
Yoná Magalhães	Valentina Venturini
Cássio Gabus Mendes	Doca (Eduardo José Gentil da Silva) / Eduardo Costabrava
Lídia Brondi	Fernanda Castro
Jorge Dória	Emílio Marques
Nívea Maria	Berenice Marques Castro
Luciana Braga	Dirce Aparecida Alves
Armando Bogus	Felipe Brandão de Mello
Thales Pan Chacon	Henrique Paiva
Ísis de Oliveira	Maria Isabel Raposo Toledo (Mimi Toledo)
Mila Moreira	Bianca Paiva
Françoise Forton	Marcela Miranda
Marcos Paulo	André Manfrini
Zilda Cardoso	Elza Gonçalves Gentil
Ariclê Perez	Rosa Maria/Maria Helena Venturini
Lizandra Souto	Victória Venturini
Guilherme Karan	Porfírio Tavares
Mylla Christie	Jéssica Miranda
Luma de Oliveira	Ana Maria
Adriana Esteves	Patrícia Ferraz de Mello
Fábio Assunção	Marco Antônio Venturini
Vera Zimmermann	Divina Magda
Sônia Clara	Angelina
Edson Fieschi	João Manuel
Marcelo Galdino	Jorge
Monique Alves	Luciana

== Crossover with Ti Ti Ti ==
One of the most famous characters in Meu Bem, Meu Mal, Divina Magda (played by Vera Zimmermann) returned in the 2010 telenovela Ti Ti Ti, as a recurring character and an ally of one of the protagonists, Jacques Leclair (played by Alexandre Borges).

In Ti Ti Ti, Jacques' loyal assistant, Clotilde (played by Juliana Alves) implies that Divina Magda is a black widow and that she would have intentionally killed two of the men with whom she had a romantic relationship: Dom Lázaro Venturini (played by Lima Duarte), the protagonist of Meu Bem, Meu Mal and Porfírio Tavares (played by Guilherme Karam), with whom he formed the most iconic couple there.
