= Brega e Chique =

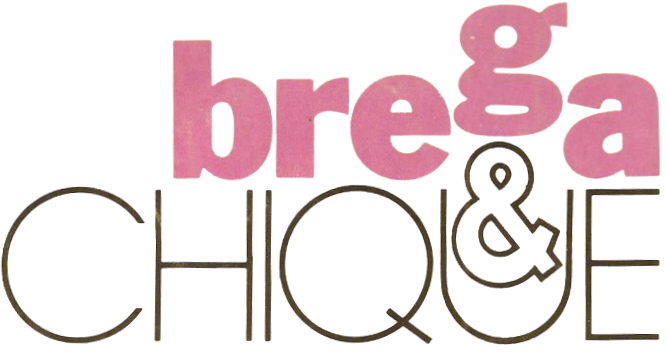
- Also known as: Brega & Chique
- Genre: Telenovela
- Created by: Cassiano Gabus Mendes
- Directed by: Jorge Fernando
- Starring: Glória Menezes; Marília Pêra; Raul Cortez
- Opening theme: "Pelado", Ultraje a Rigor
- Country of origin: Brazil
- Original language: Portuguese
- No. of episodes: 173

Production
- Production location: Brazil
- Running time: 55 minutes (approx.)

Original release
- Network: Rede Globo
- Release: 20 April – 6 November 1987

Brega e Chique is a 1987 Brazilian telenovela created by Cassiano Gabus Mendes, and starring Gloria Menezes and Marília Pêra.

== Plot ==
From opposite worlds, Rosemere da Silva (Glória Menezes) and Rafaela Alvaray (Marília Pêra) have their stories crossed because of Herbert Alvaray, a businessman from São Paulo, married to both.

== Cast ==
Actor	Character
Glória Menezes	Rosemere da Silva Francis
Marília Pêra	Rafaella Alvaray
Marco Nanini	Montenegro
Raul Cortez	Cláudio Serra / Herbert Alvaray
Jorge Dória	Herbert Alvaray / Mário Francis
Cássia Kis	Silvana
Nívea Maria	Zilda
Dennis Carvalho	Baltazar
Marcos Paulo	Luiz Paulo
Patrícia Pillar	Ana Cláudia Alvaray
Cássio Gabus Mendes	Bruno
Patricia Travassos	Mercedes
Tato Gabus Mendes	Maurício
Cristina Mullins	Tamyris Alvaray
Célia Biar	Francine
Percy Aires	Justino
Neuza Amaral	Lucy
Hélio Souto	Amadeu
Barbara Fazio	Bianca
Paulo César Grande	Pedro
Fábio Sabag	Lorival da Silva
Jayme Periard	João Antônio
José Augusto Branco	Bellotti
Tarcísio Filho	Teddy (Teobaldo Alvaray)
Paula Lavigne	Vânia da Silva
Kaká Barrete	Amaurí da Silva
Suzy Camacho	Rosinha
Marco Miranda	Antônio
Ângela Figueiredo	Marlie
Valéria Keller	Rosely
Anderson Müller	Quibe Frito
Fabiane Mendonça	Marcinha
