= Eva Wilma =

Brazilian actress and dancer (1933–2021)

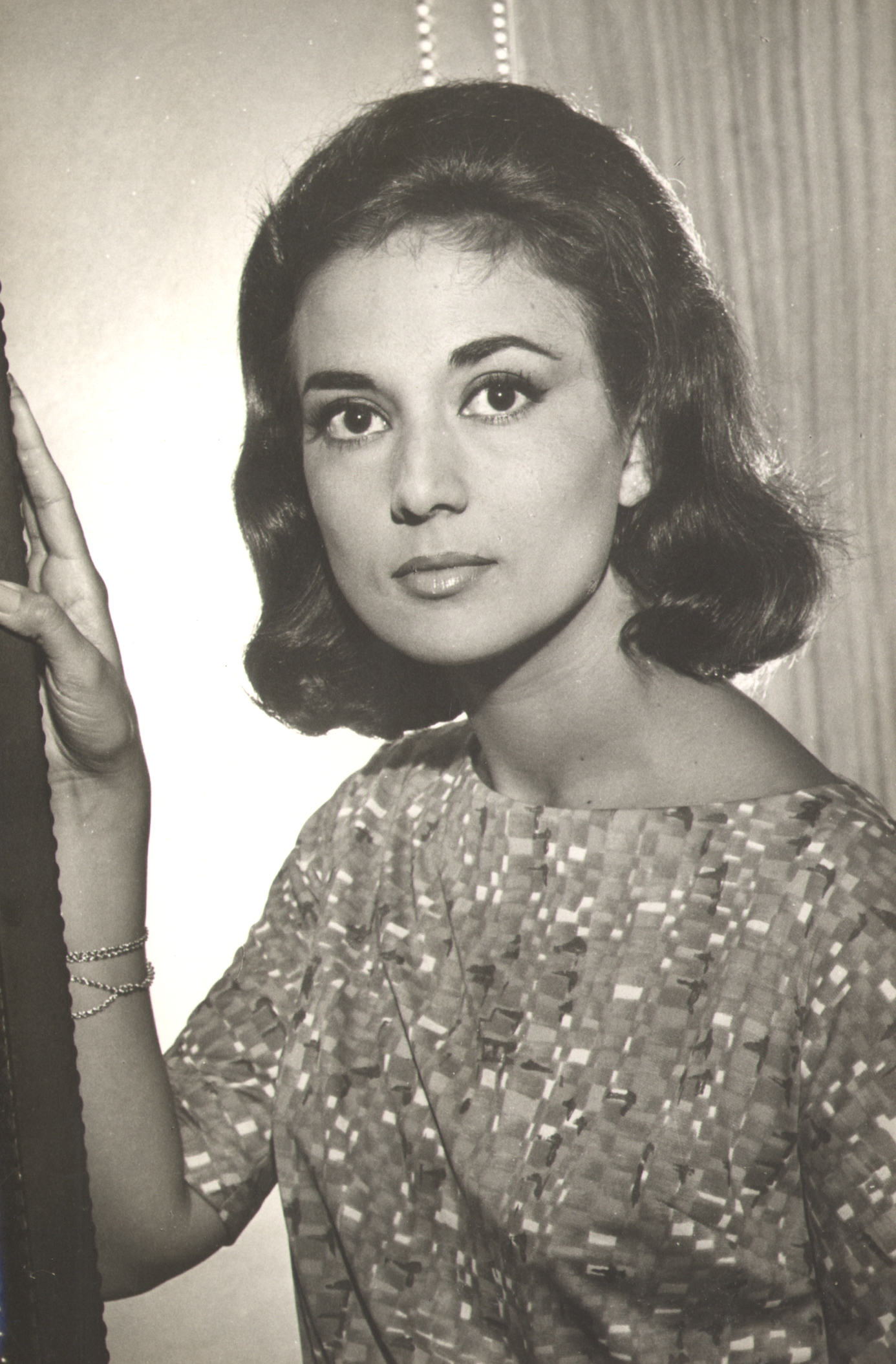
- Born: Eva Wilma Riefle; 14 December 1933; São Paulo, Brazil
- Died: 15 May 2021 (aged 87); São Paulo, Brazil
- Occupations: Actress, dancer
- Years active: 1952–2021
- Spouses: John Herbert (m. 1955; sep. 1976) Carlos Zara (m. 1979; died 2002)
- Children: 2

Eva Wilma Buckup (née Riefle; 14 December 1933 – 15 May 2021) was a Brazilian actress and dancer. Among her several roles, she starred in the 1950s Brazilian television series Alô, Doçura!.

== Biography ==
Eva Wilma was born in São Paulo. Her father, Otto Riefle Jr, was a German metallurgist from the Black Forest region of Pforzheim near Stuttgart in southern Germany. He went to Brazil, more precisely to the city of Rio de Janeiro in 1929, at the age of 19, to work in a metallurgy firm. Eva Wilma's mother, Luísa Carp, was born in Buenos Aires, Argentina, she was the daughter of Ukrainian Jews from Kyiv who immigrated to Argentina. Eva's parents met in the city of São Paulo when Eva's father was transferred to the city, and her mother, after living in Buenos Aires, moved to Brazil. In 1956 she was awarded with Prêmio Saci.

She was married for 23 years to actor John Herbert, with whom she had two children, Vivian and John Jr. She later married actor Carlos Zara.

== Death ==
Eva Wilma died at the age of 87 in São Paulo, 15 May 2021, at the Albert Einstein Hospital, of ovarian cancer.

== Filmography ==
Year	Title	Role	Notes
1953	A Flea on the Scales		
1953	O Homem Dos Papagaios		
1953	O Craque	Elisa	
1954	A Sogra		
1955	Chico Viola Não Morreu		
1958	O Cantor e o Milionário	Laura	
1960	Cidade Ameaçada	Terezinha	
1962	The Fifth Power	Laura Leal	
1963	A Ilha		
1963	Murder in Rio	Leila	
1965	São Paulo, Sociedade Anônima	Luciana	
1967	Juego peligroso	Lucía	(segment "Divertimento")
1969	Topaz	Rosita Gomez	Uncredited
1970	A Arte de Amar Bem	Inês	(segment "A Inconfidência de Ser Esposa")
1973-1974	Mulheres de Areia	Ruth and Raquel	TV series
1975	Cada um Dá o que Tem		(segment "Cartão de Crédito")
1980	Asa Branca: Um Sonho Brasileiro	Mother of Asa Branca	
1981	Ciranda de Pedra	Laura Prado	TV series
1983	O Menino Arco-Íris		
1987	Feliz Ano Velho	Lúcia (based on Eunice Paiva)	
1992	Pedra sobre Pedra	Hilda Pontes	TV series
1995	História de Amor	Zuleika Viana Sampaio	TV series
1997	A Indomada	Maria Altiva Pedreira de Mendonça e Albuquerque	203 episodes
2002	Esperança	Rosa	TV series
2004-2005	Começar de Novo	Lucrécia	159 episodes
2006	Veias e Vinhos - Uma História Brasileira		
2007	The Sign of the City	Adélia	
2007-2008	Desejo Proibido	Cândida	120 episodes
2010	A Guerra dos Vizinhos	Adélia	
2011-2012	Fina Estampa	Maria Íris Siqueira De Maciel	TV series
2015	Verdades Secretas	Fábia	48 episodes
2018	O Tempo Não Para	Petra Vaisánen	22 episodes, (final appearance)
