= John Herbert (actor) =

Brazilian actor, director and producer (1929–2011)

- Born: John Herbert Buckup; May 17, 1929; São Paulo, Brazil
- Died: January 26, 2011 (aged 81); São Paulo, Brazil
- Occupations: Actor, director, producer
- Years active: 1953–2009

John Herbert (May 17, 1929 – January 26, 2011) was a Brazilian actor, director and producer.

Herbert was born John Herbert Buckup in São Paulo. He appeared in numerous soap operas and telenovelas for Globo TV, making his last appearance in the 2008 series, Três Irmãs.

Herbert was married to Brazilian actress Eva Wilma, with whom he had two children, Vivian and John Jr. Herbert later married Claudia Librach and had two more children; they were still married when he died. He died from complications of pulmonary emphysema in São Paulo on January 26, 2011, at the age of 81, following a three-week hospitalization.

== Selected filmography ==
- A Flea on the Scales (1953) - Alberto
- Candinho (1954) - Quincas
- O Petróleo é Nosso (1954) - Sílvio
- Floradas na Serra (1954) - Flávio
- Matar ou Correr (1954) - Bill
- A Outra Face do Homem (1954)
- Rio Fantasia (1956) - Carlos
- Escravos do Amor das Amazonas (1957) - Hotel Desk Clerk
- Dioguinho (1957)
- E O Espetáculo Continua (1958) - Renato
- Alegria de Viver (1958) - Gilberto
- A Grande Vedete (1958) - Paulo
- Maria 38 (1959) - Chico
- A Moça do Quarto 13 (Girl in Room 13) (1960) - Police Captain
- Por Um Céu de Liberdade (1961)
- Assassinato em Copacabana (1962) - Humberto
- Copacabana Palace (1962)
- Gimba, Presidente dos Valentes (1963) - Repórter
- Mulher Satânica (1964)
- Toda Donzela Tem Um Pai Que É Uma Fera (1966) - Porfírio
- As Cariocas (1966) - Cid
- O Caso dos Irmãos Naves (1967) - Defense lawyer
- Bebel, Garota Propaganda (1968) - Marcos
- Helga und die Männer - Die sexuelle Revolution (1969) - Carlos
- O Cangaceiro Sanguinário (1969) - Cisso
- Corisco, O Diabo Loiro (1969) - Bem-te-vi
- O Palácio dos Anjos (1970) - Carlos Eduardo
- Em Cada Coração um Punhal (1970) - (segments "Transplante de Mãe" and "O Filho da Televisão")
- Cleo e Daniel (1970) - Rudolf Fluegel
- A Guerra dos Pelados (1970)
- A Arte de Amar Bem (1970) - Iseu (segment "A Garçonière de Meu Marido")
- Capitão Bandeira Contra o Dr. Moura Brasil (1971)
- Nem Santa Nem Donzela (1973)
- A Super Fêmea (1973)
- As Delícias da Vida (1974) - Esteves
- O Sexo Mora ao Lado (1975) - João
- Cada um Dá o que Tem (1975) - Otávio (segment "Cartão de Crédito")
- O Quarto da Viúva (1976)
- Já Não Se Faz Amor Como Antigamente (1976) - Macedo (segment "Noivo, O") and Alvaro (segment "Flor de Lys")
- Meus Homens, Meus Amores (1978)
- A Santa Donzela (1978)
- O Bem Dotado - O Homem de Itu (1978) - Himself
- O Caçador de Esmeraldas (1979)
- Ariella (1980) - Diogo
- O Inseto do Amor (1980) - Aristocrata Moura
- O Gosto do Pecado (1980) - Enéas
- Bacanal (1980)
- O Torturador (1981)
- Tessa, a Gata (1982)
- Retrato Falado de uma Mulher Sem Pudor (1982) - Johnny Gravatinha
- Deu Veado na Cabeça (1982)
- As Aventuras de Mário Fofoca (1982)
- Amor de Perversão (1982)
- Jeitosa, Um Assunto Muito Particular (1984)
- Os Bons Tempos Voltaram, Vamos Gozar Outra Vez (1985) - Fernando (segment "Sábado Quente")
- Made in Brazil (1985) - (segment "Um Milagre Brasileiro")
- As Sete Vampiras (1986) - Rogério
- A Menina do Lado (1987) - Padrasto de Alice / Alice's stepfather
- Per sempre (1991)
- A Viagem (1994, TV Series) - Agenor Barbosa
- Drama Urbano (1998)
- A Hora Mágica (1999) - Jorge
- Malhação (1995-2005, TV Series) - Nabuco / Horácio
- Onde Andará Dulce Veiga? (2008) - Apresentador de TV
