= Luis Gustavo (actor) =

Brazilian actor (1934–2021)

Luis Gustavo Sánchez Blanco (February 2, 1934 − September 19, 2021) was a Spanish-Brazilian actor.

Born in Gothenburg, Sweden, he was the son of a Spanish diplomat, Luis Amador Sánchez Fernández, working in Sweden, and Elena Blanco Castañera, a Spanish woman. He came to live in Brazil at four years old, when his father arrived in the country to become the Spanish ambassador.

He started working as an assistant director at TV Tupi, accompanying his sister, the actress Helenita Sanches, appointed by Cassiano Gabus Mendes, the station's artistic director and his brother-in-law. Soon after, he had already participated in several films, telenovelas, and telethons until he starred as the eponymous anti-hero in the 1968 telenovela Beto Rockfeller. Since then he has consolidated his artistic career acting in several soap operas and films, mainly in comedy roles.

== Death ==
Luís Gustavo died on September 19, 2021, in Itatiba, at the age of 87. He had been undergoing an intestine cancer treatment in 2018, having withdrawn from acting since then.

== Filmography ==
=== Television ===
Year	Title	Role
1953	Segundos Fatais	—N/a
1953	Somos Dois	—N/a
1953	TV de Vanguarda	Several characters (1953–1957)
1954	Sangue na Terra	Pintado
1954	O Destino Desce de Elevador	—N/a
1955	Oliver Twist	Raposa
1955	Caminhos Sem Fim	Felismino
1956	Caminhos Incertos	—N/a
1956	E o Vento Levou	—N/a
1956	O Contador de Histórias	—N/a
1959	O Príncipe e o Pobre	—N/a
1962	A Noite Eterna	—N/a
1962	A Única Verdade	—N/a
1963	Terror nas Trevas	—N/a
1963	Noites Quentes de Copacabana	—N/a
1964	O Direito de Nascer	Osvaldo
1964	Se o Mar Contasse	Polo
1964	O Sorriso de Helena	Hudson
1965	Teresa	Mário
1965	O Pecado de Cada Um	Fernando
1966	O Amor Tem Cara de Mulher	Paulo
1966	Ciúme	Alfredo
1967	Yoshico, Um Poema de Amor	Luís Paulo
1967	Estrelas no Chão	Jorge
1967	A Hora Marcada	Mário
1968	Beto Rockfeller	Beto Rockfeller
1972	Editora Mayo, Bom Dia	Ray
1973	A Volta de Beto Rockfeller	Beto Rockfeller
1974	Os Inocentes	Victor
1975	O Sheik de Ipanema	Carlos Alberto
1976	Duas Vidas	Osvaldo
1976	Anjo Mau	Ricardo Medeiros
1978	Te Contei?	Léo
1979	Cara a Cara	Fran
1980	Rosa Baiana	Marcelo
1982	Elas por Elas	Mário Cury (Mário Fofoca)
1983	Mário Fofoca	Mário Cury (Mário Fofoca)
1983	Caso Verdade	Antônio Maciel (Episode: "Vida Nova")
1985	Ti Ti Ti	Ariclenes Almeida (Victor Valentin)
1989	O Salvador da Pátria	José Matos Filho (Juca Pirama)
1989	Que Rei Sou Eu?	Charles Müller
1990	Mico Preto	Firmino do Espírito Santo
1993	O Mapa da Mina	Antonny Sgrangatto (Tony)
1994–96	Confissões de Adolescente	Paulo Araújo
1996–02	Sai de Baixo	Vanderley Mathias (Vavá)
2002	O Beijo do Vampiro	Galileu Van Bürger
2004	Começar de Novo	Elvis / Glauco Oliveira (Vô Doidão)
2005	Alma Gêmea	Romeu Dantas de Carvalho
2006	O Profeta	Piragibe Carvalho
2007	Faça Sua História	Agostinho
2008	Três Irmãs	Nereu Vidigal Castro (Deputado Vidigal)
2009	Cama de Gato	Waldemar
2010	As Cariocas	Gustavo
2010	Ti Ti Ti	Mário Fofoca
2012	Malhação	Rômulo Rios
2013	Joia Rara	Apolônio Fonseca
2013	Sai de Baixo	Vanderley Mathias (Vavá)
2016	Êta Mundo Bom!	Comendador Eustáquio Fragoso
2018	Malhação: Vidas Brasileiras	Heitor Laroche
2018	Brasil a Bordo	Gonçalo Galvez

=== Cinema ===
Year	Title	Role
1956	O Sobrado	Jango Veiga
1963	Casinha Pequenina	Bento
1963	Mord in Rio	Raul
1970	Beto Rockfeller	Beto Rockfeller
1978	Amada Amante	Augusto
1979	Sede de Amar	Jairo
1982	As Aventuras de Mário Fofoca	Mário Fofoca
2005	O Casamento de Romeu e Julieta	Alfredo Baragatti
2012	Os Penetras	Anchieta
2019	Sai de Baixo – O Filme	"Vavá" Vanderley Mathias
