= Antônio Calmon =

Brazilian telenovela writer (born 1945)

- Born: Antônio Augusto Du Pin Calmon; October 29, 1945 (age 80); Manaus, Brazil
- Occupations: Writer; Novelist; Film director

Antônio Augusto Du Pin Calmon (born October 29, 1945) is a Brazilian telenovela writer.

== Career ==
Beginning of his professional career took place in cinema, as director of short films and assistant direction in seminal films of the so-called Cinema Novo (New Cinema), then conducted the Brazilian film Paranoia (1975), with screenplay by Carlos Heitor Cony, a tense police drama and suspense, on television wrote the serial-TV Armação Ilimitada, attraction displayed by Globo TV between 1985 until 1988. His debut as the author was in 1989, when he wrote along with Walther Negro the novel Top Model, which addressed topics among others such as masturbation and pregnancy in adolescence, was a phenomenon of audience in Brazilian TV.
