= Virginia Cavendish =

Brazilian actress and film producer (born 1970)

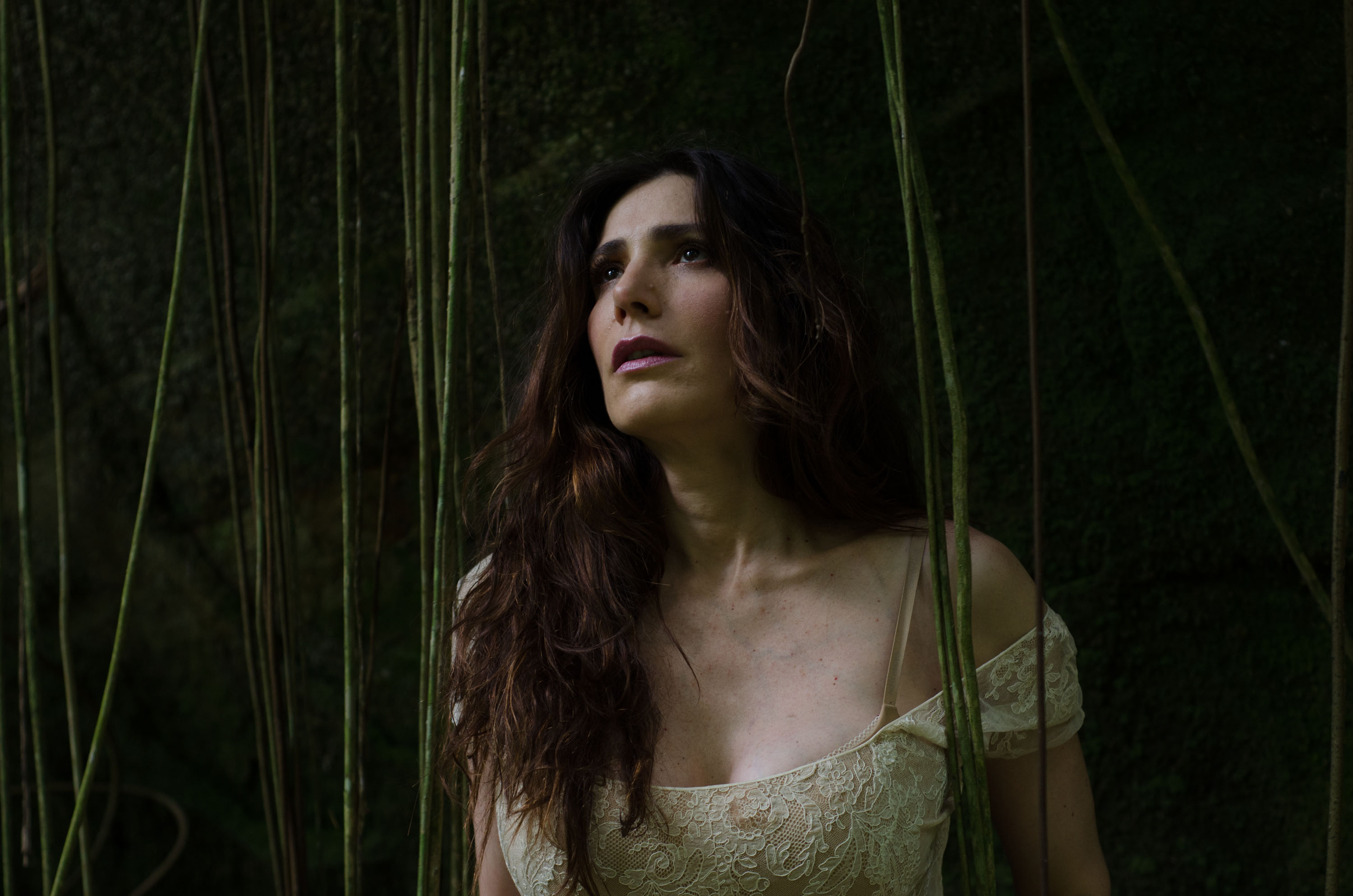
- Born: Virginia Cavendish Moura; 25 November 1970 (age 55); Recife, Brazil
- Occupations: Actress, television presenter and film producer
- Spouse: Guel Arraes (1991–2001)
- Children: Luisa Arraes

Virginia Cavendish Moura (born 25 November 1970) is a Brazilian actress, television presenter and film producer, most well known for her work in films directed by her ex-husband Guel Arraes, such as A Dog's Will and Lisbela e o Prisioneiro. With television appearances, she is most well known for her performance in Avassaladoras as Maria Teresa, and for presenting the program TNT + Filme.

She started her career while in her hometown of Recife, performing in theatre with names such as João Falcão and Hamilton Vaz Pereira. Afterwards, she began a prolific career in film, beginning in the late 1980s, with nationally successful roles in the decades after. Her performances on TV Globo productions also garnered further success, with varied roles in productions such as Andando nas Nuvens, O Cravo e a Rosa, and Da Cor do Pecado.

In 2006, Cavendish moved to Rede Record to become the protagonist of Avassaladoras, alongside Vanessa Lóes, Débora Lamm and Giselle Itié. With the end of the program after a brief run, she returned to TV Globo and acted in more telenovelas and series such as Caminho das Índias and Ó Paí Ó. Still within this new phase, she debuted as a television presenter on the program TNT + Filme, on the subscription channel TNT, alongside Rubens Ewald Filho as a commentator.

== Biography ==
Cavendish was born in Recife on 25 November 1970, the daughter of Romero Marinho de Moura and Sueli Pessoa Cavendish. She began her career in local theatres, performing pieces such as A Ver Estrelas, by João Falcão, and Leve, o Próximo Nome da Terra, by Hamilton Vaz Pereira and Walter Lima Jr., and Antígona, by Moacyr Góes. She started performing when she was 17 years old. While in secondary school, she attended theatre classes with businessman Anderson Pacheco, responsible for Trem do Forró.

=== Beginning of career (1988-1996) ===
At the end of the 1980s, Cavendish moved on to film, where she made appearances in various videos and short films before entering the national film circuit. During this phase, she participated in Batom, by Ana Paula Portela and Que M... É Essa?, by Bruno Garcia and Marco Hanois, along with having made an appearance in Kuarup by Ruy Guerra in 1989.

In the 1990s, she continued to participate in short films such as Soneto do Desmantelo Blue, in 1993, and only debuted in feature films alongside Rosemberg Cariry in the 1996 film Corisco & Dadá.

=== National prominence (1998-2006) ===
By 1998, she began to participate in productions by Rede Globo. Her first role with the company was Rosália in the series Dona Flor e Seus Dois Maridos. That same year, she also performed as Fernanda Peixoto in the mini-series Labirinto, starring Malu Mader and Fábio Assunção.

In 1999, Cavendish she played a role in Andando nas Nuvens, a production that's seven hours long and starting Marco Nanini. That year, she also began to play one of her most notable roles: Rosinha, in the mini series A Dogs Will, by her former husband Guel Arraes. The mini series, which starred Selton Mello and Matheus Nachtergaele, was a hit on television and, afterwards, was transformed into a film of the same name and launched nationwide the year after.

Later on, in 2000, she became part of the cast for O Cravo e a Rosa, by Walcyr Carrasco, playing Bárbara Maciel. As Filhas da Mãe, by Sílvio de Abreu, was her next role on television. In the meanwhile, Cavendish also returned to theatre, where she starred alongside Bruno Garcia, in the piece Lisbela e o Prisioneiro, once again in partnership with Arraes.

The play would also be made to film and become a major success in 2003, starring Selton Mello and Débora Falabella, and directed by Arraes. Cavendish played Inaura in the movie, with her also making her debut as a producer of films.

In 2004, Cavendish returned to TV with a guest appearance in the telenovela Da Cor do Pecado and afterwards became part of the regular cast of Mandrake, starring Marcos Palmeira and broadcast on HBO. In the series, Cavendish plays Verônica. In 2005, the actress also worked on Começar de Novo and Carga Pesada. She became a member of the jury for that years Cine Pernambuco - Festival do Audiovisual.

In 2005, her mother Sueli made, at her request, a translation of Collected Stories by Donald Margulies; for this occasion, the Brazilian version received the title "Comendo Entre as Refeições" and where Cavendish played the protagonist Lisa Morrison, and Aracy Balabanian as Ruth Steiner; the same piece had already been adapted prior as Histórias Roubadas. With Walter Lima Júnior as director, it debuted in December of that year at the Teatro das Artes in Rio de Janeiro.

=== Current projects (2006-present) ===
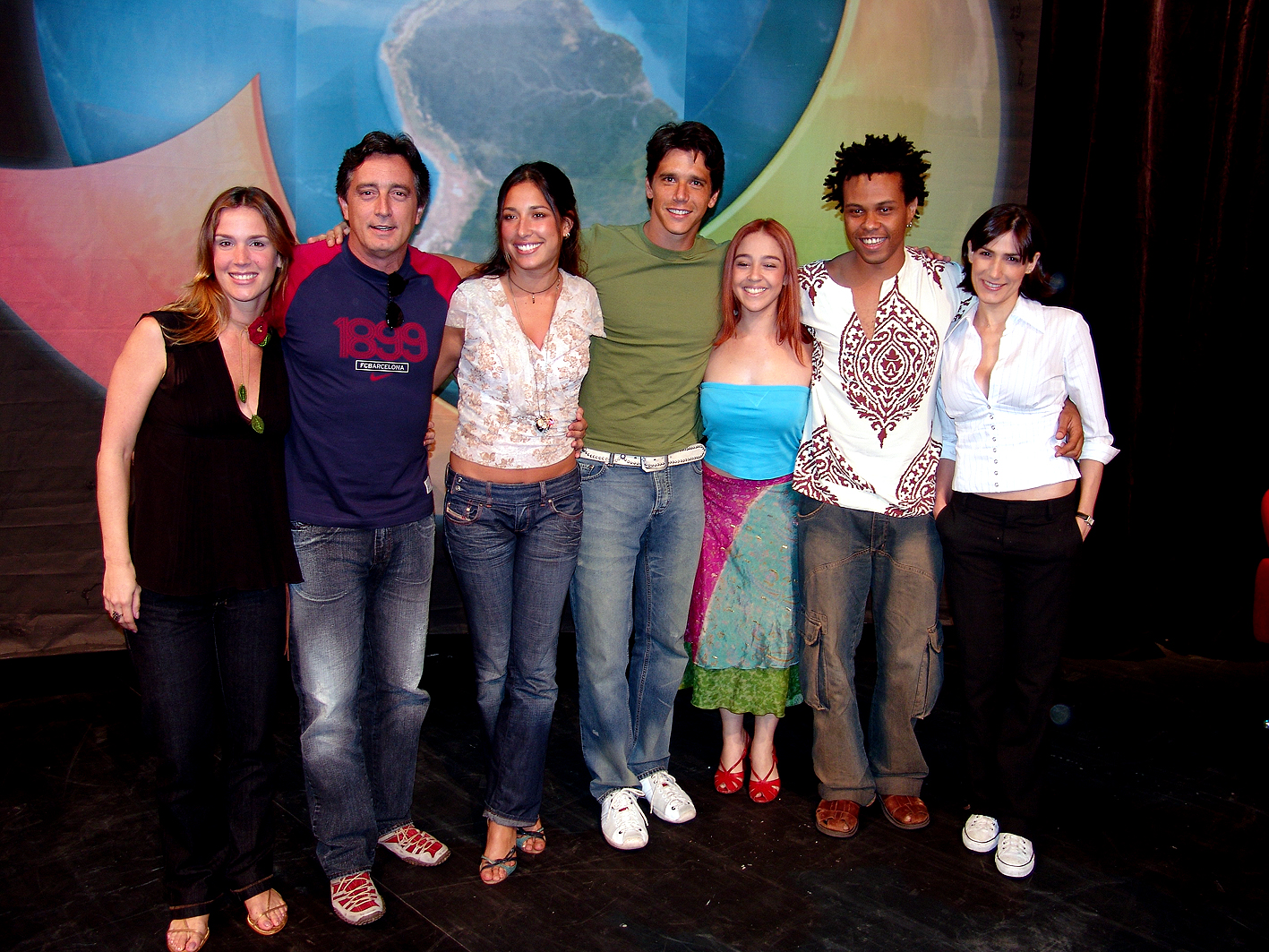
Virgínia Cavendish and the cast of Avassaladoras - A Série

In 2006, Cavendish switched broadcasters, leaving TV Globo and moving to Record to star in the series Avassaladoras, based on the film of the same name, a 2001 production starring Giovanna Antonelli. The cast included Vanessa Lóes, Débora Lamm and Giselle Itié, and was directed by Mara Mourão, as was the case with the film.

Initially, the actress had been invited to play the role of Beth (which would eventually be played by Lamm), but asked Mourão if she could act as one of the other protagonists. She explained in an interview with Terra: "I had been invited initially to do Beth, precisely the femme fatale. But I asked to do a different role". She then went on to play the workaholic Maria Teresa.

The next year, she would return to play Verônica when HBO ordered the production of five new episodes of Mandrake, seeking to complete the first season broadcast in 2004

After the cancelling of Avassaladoras after just one season with Record, and the end of her marriage of 10 years to Arraes, Cavendish returned to TV Globo in 2008, participating in an episode of Casos e Acasos, alongside Herson Capri, and made a special guest appearance on Ó Paí Ó as the producer Hipólita. On the character, Cavendish declared that she "had missed to work with an accent" and "that being an awesome Bahian woman would be amazing". In 2009, the actress also came to interpret Selma Magalhães in the telenovela Caminho das Índias by Glória Perez. She played the sister-in-law of Yvone, who is played by Letícia Sabatella, and only played in some of the final episodes.

Along with having returned to TV Globo, the actress also debuted as a TV presenter on the subscription TV channel TNT, by way of their interactive program TNT + Filme. Rubens Ewald Filho is the commentator on the program and reveals the answers to the questions posed by Cavendish during the program.

== Personal life ==
In 1993, she gave birth to her daughter, actress and filmmaker Luisa Arraes, with her then-husband and director Guel Arraes. In 2001, they separated after having been married for 10 years. The separation did not prevent her from inviting Arraes to direct Lisbela e o Prisioneiro, a film she had produced and had acted in. In 2003, she began to date art director Toni Vanzolini, with whom she was in a relationship with for 5 years.

== Filmography ==
=== Television ===
Year	Title	Role	Notes
1998	Dona Flor e Seus Dois Maridos	Rosália	
1998	Labirinto	Fernanda Peixoto	
1999	O Auto da Compadecida	Maria Rosa Noronha de Brito Morais (Rosinha)	
1999	Andando nas Nuvens	Patrícia	
2000	O Cravo e a Rosa	Bárbara Maciel	
2001	As Filhas da Mãe	Maria Leopoldina	
2004	Da Cor do Pecado	Livinha	
2004	A Grande Família	Maria Padilha	Episode: "A Morte do Bom Velhinho"
2004	Começar de Novo	Virgínia	
2005	Carga Pesada	Marta	Episode: "O Lobisomem"
2005	Mandrake	Verônica	
2006	Avassaladoras	Maria Teresa	
2007-10	TNT + Filme	Presenter	
2007	Super Sincero	Moça no cinema	Episode: "A Namorada"
2008	Ó Paí Ó	Hipólita	Episode: "Brega"
2008	Casos e Acasos	Luciana	Episode: "O Diagnóstico, o Fetiche e a Bebida"
2009	Caminho das Índias	Selma Magalhães	
2010	Malhação ID	Linda Glitter	
2010	A Grande Família	Clarisse	Episode: "Desejo & Repartição"
2011	Malhação Conectados	Helena	
2011	Homens de Bem	Cristina	Year end special
2014	As Canalhas	Sandra	Episode: "Celina, A Mãe Dedicada"
2016	Nada Será Como Antes	Carmem Veiga	
2016	A Cara do Pai	Carmem Cavalcante	Episode: "Partiu Reveillon"
2017-19	A Vida Secreta dos Casais	Miranda	
2021	Gênesis	Najla	Arc: Jornada de Abraão
2021	Desjuntados	Joana	Episodes: "Desmoronar" "Deslumbrar" "Despertar"
2024	Da Ponte Pra Lá	Leila Bianchi	6 episodes

=== Film ===
Year	Title	Role	Notes
1988	Batom		
1989	Que M... É Essa?	Tânia's Sister	
1989	Kuarup		
1993	Soneto do Desmantelo Blue	Young person at Carnaval	Short film
1996	Corisco &amp; Dadá	Lídia de Zé Baiano	
2000	A Dog's Will	Rosinha	
2003	Lisbela e o Prisioneiro	Inaura	
2015	Califórnia	Cris	
2015	Até que a Casa Caia	Ciça	
2016	Através da Sombra	Laura	
2022	Diário de Viagem	Regina	
2024	A Dog's Will 2	Rosinha	

== Theatre ==
Year	Title	Role	Ref.
1989	Fêmeas	Júlia	
1990	A Ver Estrelas	Witch	
1994	Édipo Rei	Jocasta	
1994-95	Antígona	Coro	
1995-97	O Burguês Ridículo	Lucille	
2000-01	Lisbela & o Prisioneiro	Lisbela	
2004	A Leve - O Próximo Nome da Terra	Frederica	
2006	Comendo Entre as Refeições	Lisa	
2006-08	Hedda Gable	Hedda Gable	
2014-16	Não Vamos Pagar!	Antônia	
2016	O Inferno em Mim	Lívia	
2017	Luís Antonio-Gabriela	Maria Cristina	
2017-18	O Rio	Mulher	
2022	Terremotos	Sarah	
2022-23	Mary Stuart	Mary Stuart	

== Awards and nominations ==
Year	Association	Category	Nomination	Result
2001	Prêmio Qualidade Brasil - RJ	Beat Comedy Theatre Actress	Lisbela e o Prisioneiro	Nominated
2003	Prêmio Arte Qualidade Brasil - SP	Best Supporting Actress - Film	Lisbela e o Prisioneiro	Won
2003	Prêmio Arte Qualidade Brasil - RJ	Best Supporting Actress - Film	Lisbela e o Prisioneiro	Won
2004	Grande Prêmio do Cinema Brasileiro	Best Supporting Actress	Lisbela e o Prisioneiro	Nominated
2004	Prêmio Guarani de Cinema Brasileiro	Best Supporting Actress	Lisbela e o Prisioneiro	Nominated
2005	Blockbuster Entertainment Awards	Best Comedy Address	Lisbela e o Prisioneiro	Nominated
2015	Festival de Cinema Fantástico de Porto Alegre	Best Actress	Através da Sombra	Won
2015	Fest Aruanda do Audiovisual Brasileiro	Best Actress	Através da Sombra	Won
