= Marieta Severo =

Brazilian actress (born 1946)

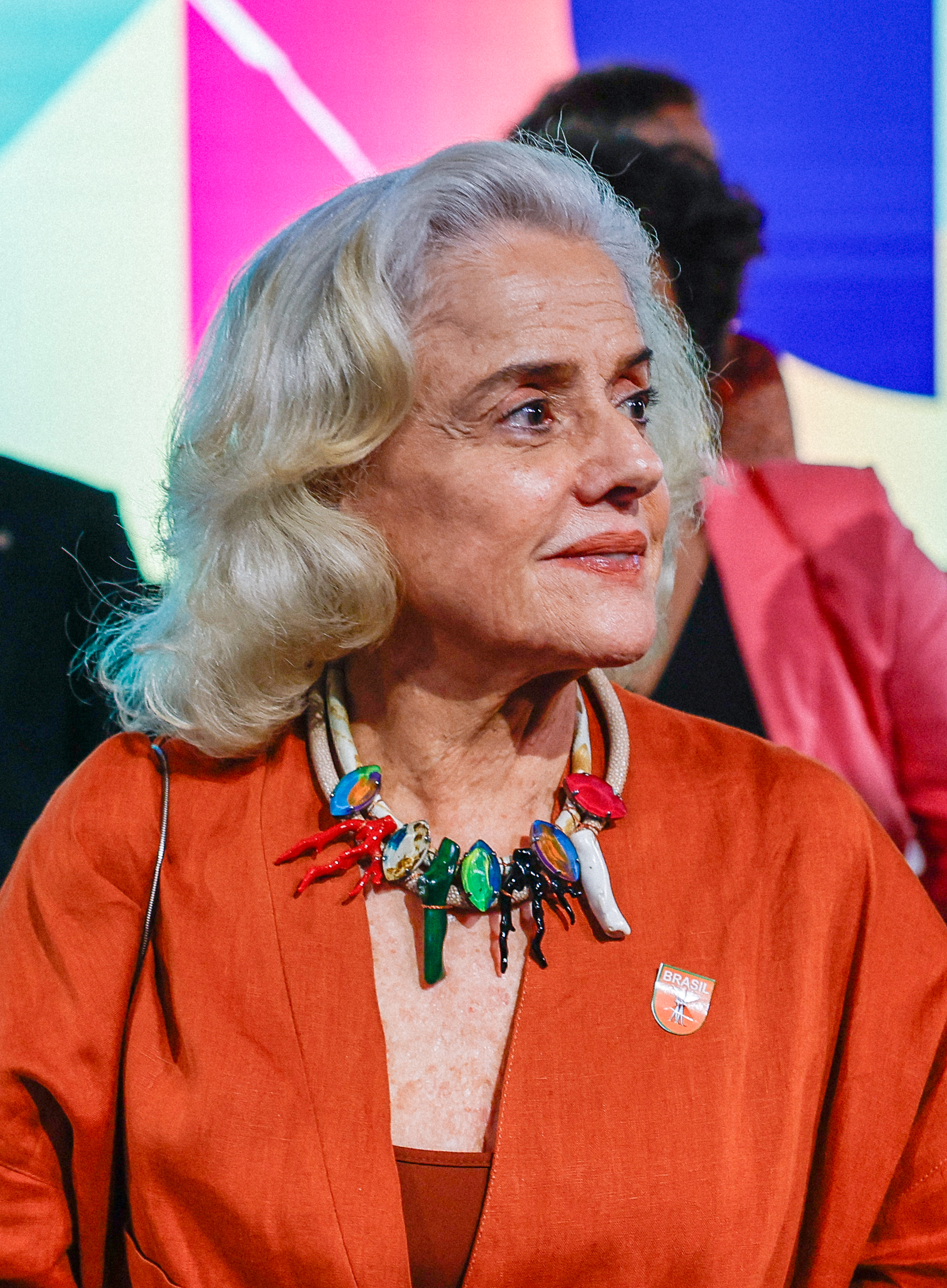
- Severo in June 2024
- Born: 2 November 1946 (age 79); Rio de Janeiro, Brazil
- Occupation: Actress
- Years active: 1965–present
- Spouses: Carlos Vergara (m. 1964; sep. 1965) Chico Buarque (m. 1966; div. 1999) Aderbal Freire Filho (m. 2004; died 2023)
- Children: 3

Marieta Severo da Costa (born 2 November 1946) is a Brazilian stage, film and television actress. She is best known to youth audiences as the archetypal mother figure in popular sitcom A Grande Família (2001–2014), as well to mature audiences for portraying villains in telenovelas.

== Early life ==
Severo was born on November 2, 1946, in Rio de Janeiro, Rio de Janeiro to Luís Antonio Severo da Costa (a Brazilian army officer) and Lígia Paixão. She studied in Tablado Theater in 1965, and later that year, premiered on her first play Feitiço de Salém.

== Career ==
Severo starred in her first telenovela in 1966. It was the Rede Globo production of O Sheik de Agadir (The Sheik of Agadir) in which she played the supporting character of Madelon. In 1978 she played the lead character in the film Chuvas de Verão. She continued to appear in some television programs and films, but major leading roles did not came until the 1986 films Com Licença, Eu Vou à Luta, A Espera, O Homem da Capa Preta. In 1987, she played Leila Diniz' mother in the biopic of the same name. In 1989, public acclaim came with the telenovela Que Rei Sou Eu?, with Marco Nanini. In 1995, critical acclaim came with the film Carlota Joaquina - Princesa do Brasil, which she also starred with Nanini. She continues to appear with major supporting characters in films like Cazuza - O Tempo Não Pára and TV shows, but she is perhaps widely known and acclaimed for her role as Nenê, the matriarch of the Silva family in the Rede Globo series A Grande Família (in which she also stars with Nanini).

She was also the voice for villain Yzma in the Brazilian version of The Emperor's New Groove.

== Children and grandchildren ==
Severo was married from 1966 to 1999 to popular MPB singer Chico Buarque de Holanda. They have worked together in his plays Roda Viva and A Ópera do Malandro. The couple had three girls: Sílvia (born 28 March 1969) (actress in Rede Globo's miniseries Amazônia), Helena (born 22 December 1970) and Luísa Buarque de Hollanda (born 17 September 1975). They also have five grandchildren: Irene (Sílvia's daughter), Francisco Buarque de Freitas, Clara Buarque de Freitas and Cecília Buarque de Freitas (Helena's children) and Lia (Luísa's daughter). She is the mother-in-law of actor Chico Díaz and composer Carlinhos Brown.

== Filmography ==
=== Telenovelas ===
- Um Lugar ao Sol as Dona Noca (Ana Maria Moreira Bastos) (2021-2022)
- O Outro Lado do Paraíso as Sophia Montserrat (2017-2018)
- Verdades Secretas as Fanny Richard / Rita de Cássia (2015)
- A Grande Família as Irene Souza Silva (Dona Nenê) (2001-2014)
- Laços de Família as Alma Flora Pirajá de Albuquerque (2000-2001)
- A Comédia da Vida Privada Various roles (1996-1997)
- Brasil Legal as Selma (1995)
- Confissões de Adolescente as Helena (1994)
- Pátria Minha as Loretta Ramos de Ortiz Pellegrini Vilela (1994)
- Deus Nos Acuda as Elvira Ferreira Bismark (1992-1993)
- Delegacia de Mulheres as Jandira (1990)
- Que Rei Sou Eu? as Madeleine Bouchet (1989)
- Tarcísio & Glória as Carmen Oswalt (1988)
- Ti Ti Ti as Suzana Azevedo (1985-1986)
- Vereda Tropical as Catarina de Oliva Salgado (1984-1985)
- Champagne as Dinah Mercadante Brandão (1983-1984)
- Despedida de Casado as Júlia (1977)
- E Nós, Aonde Vamos? as Rachel (1970)
- O Homem Proibido as Thana (1967)
- O Sheik de Agadir as Eden de Bassora (1966-1967)
