= Homens de Bem =

Homens de Bem is a 2011 Brazilian television film directed by Jorge Furtado and starring Rodrigo Santoro.

== Synopsis ==
Ciba (Rodrigo Santoro) is an independent investigator who works together with the police. A typical fallible hero who struggles with strong personal issues, while preventing crime and injustice. His partner, Deputy Ulisses (Luis Miranda), is a well-meaning professional who recognizes the difficulty in securing his function using only common artifacts, and Ciba's unofficial contact is of utmost importance for the progress of his investigations.

Ciba's role is never revealed or commented upon by his friends and family. Everything is meticulously planned so his actions do not endanger the life of his beloved daughter, Mariana (Juliana Moretti), a sweet and sensitive girl. His mother, Mary (Débora Falabella), is a woman of doubtful character who does not pass much confidence to the protagonist.

To fulfill a secretive and dangerous mission, Ciba must win the respect and confidence of Deputy Ricardo (Fulvio Stefanini) and filming him receiving a suitcase full of dirty money. In addition, Ciba will have to use all his talent and charm to dodge a parallel investigation of Agent Cristina (Virginia Cavendish), who works for the police, but knows nothing.

== Cast ==
- Rodrigo Santoro ... Ciba
- Débora Falabella ... Mary
- Luis Miranda ... Ulisses
- Virginia Cavendish ... Cristina
- Fúlvio Stefanini ... Ricardo
- Juliana Moretti ... Mariana
- Guilherme Weber ... Cesar
- Tonico Pereira ... Corvo
- Marcos Verza ... Elvis
