= Ney Latorraca =

Brazilian actor (1944–2024)

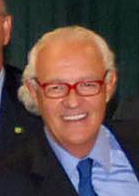
- Latorraca in 2006
- Born: Antonio Ney Latorraca; 27 July 1944; Santos, São Paulo, Brazil
- Died: 26 December 2024 (aged 80); Rio de Janeiro, Brazil
- Occupation: Actor
- Years active: 1968–2024
- Notable work: Vlad in Vamp; Edu in Da Cor do Pecado; Antônio in Um Sonho a Mais; Mederiquis in Estúpido Cupido; Dr. Solano in S.O.S. Emergência; Leandro in Coração Alado; Barbosa in TV Pirata.
- Website: uol.com.br/neylatorraca

Antonio Ney Latorraca (27 July 1944 – 26 December 2024) was a Brazilian actor.

== Life and career ==
Ney Latorraca was born on 27 July 1944 in the port city of Santos, São Paulo state, to Alfredo, a casino crooner, and Nena, a showgirl who performed in casinos. Actor Grande Otelo was his godfather, and he grew up in an artistic environment. Two years after his birth, casinos were forbidden in Brazil by a presidential decree, and his family thus lost their primary means of survival. As a result, his parents decided to move to São Paulo. His mother became a house wife and his father got a job at Rádio Record.

Latorraca started his acting career early. At six, he made an appearance on a radio series by Rádio Record. At nine, he made his first appearance on a TV programme, in the miniseries Alô, Doçura by Rede Tupi. In 1957 his family moved to Rio de Janeiro, where he continued his studies.

In 1964, Ney took part on his first play, "Pluft, O Fantasminha" written by Maria Clara Machado and directed by Serafim Gonzales. From that moment on, he decided that he would be a famous actor. His first professional opportunity came in the next year, when he was selected to join the cast of the play Reportagem de um Tempo Mau, a criticism of the military dictatorship that was ruling the country. The play was presented only once, being subsequently banned by the Federal Censorship and the whole cast arrested for a few days. Soon after, Latorraca moved back to Santos and participated in several amateur plays with the theatre group of the Faculty of Philosophy of Santos.

Beginning in 1967, Latorraca attended the University of São Paulo's School of Dramatic Art for 3 years, graduating as the first of his class. Marília Pêra was the godmother of his graduating class.

From 1968 on, Ney Latorraca participated in numerous plays, telenovelas and movies. In 1979 he performed alongside his godfather Grande Otelo in the musical play Lola Moreno. In the telenovela Um Sonho a Mais, Latorraca interpreted five different characters, including a woman. Some of his most memorable roles are the playboy Mederiquis in the soap opera Estúpido Cupido (1976), the polygamous Quequé in the miniseries Rabo de Saia (1984), and the old man Barbosa, in the comic series TV Pirata (1988).

In November 1986 he premiered with Marco Nanini one of the most successful plays in Brazilian history, O Mistério de Irma Vap, directed by Marília Pêra. The play was staged for 11 consecutive years and watched by more than 2.5 million people, setting a Brazilian record included in the Guinness Book. The play originated a motion picture, Irma Vap – O Retorno (2006), also interpreted by the two actors.

Latorraca was in a relationship for over 20 years with fellow actor Edi Botelho. Latorraca died from prostate cancer in Rio de Janeiro on 26 December 2024, at the age of 80.

== Works ==
=== Television ===
- 1968 – Beto Rockfeller
- 1969 – Super Plá
- 1972 – Quero Viver
- 1972 – Dom Camilo e Seus Cabeludos
- 1972 – Eu e a Moto
- 1973 – Vidas Marcadas
- 1973 – Venha Ver o Sol na Estrada
- 1974 – Escalada – Felipe
- 1975 – O Grito – Sérgio
- 1976 – Estúpido Cupido – Mederix
- 1977 – Sem Lenço, sem Documento – Marco
- 1978 – Saudade Não Tem Idade
- 1978 – Dancin' Days
- 1979 – Malu Mulher
- 1979 – Plantão de Polícia
- 1979 – Aplauso, Como Matar um Playboy
- 1980 – O Bem Amado
- 1980 – Chega Mais – Jonas
- 1980 – Coração Alado – Leandro Serrano
- 1982 – Caso Verdade, O Menino dos Milagres – Antoninho da Rocha Marmo
- 1982 – Elas por Elas – Porteiro do motel
- 1982 – Avenida Paulista – Sérgio
- 1983 – Eu Prometo – Albano
- 1984 – Anarquistas, Graças a Deus – Ernesto Gattai
- 1984 – Rabo de Saia – Quequé
- 1984 – Partido Alto – Escadinha
- 1985 – Grande Sertão: Veredas – Father Ponte
- 1985 – Um Sonho a Mais – Antônio Carlos Volpone/Anabela Freire/Augusto Melo Sampaio/Dr. Nilo Peixe/André Silva
- 1986 – Memórias de um Gigolô – Esmeraldo
- 1988 – TV Pirata – Barbosa
- 1990 – Brasileiras e Brasileiros – Brás Cubas
- 1991 – Vamp – Vlad
- 1994 – Éramos Seis – Sorriso Tavinho
- 1995 – Casa do Terror
- 1997 – Zazá – Silas Vadan
- 1999 – Você Decide, Madame Sussu
- 2000 – O Cravo e a Rosa – Cornélio Valente
- 2001 – Brava Gente – Raul
- 2001 – Sítio do Picapau Amarelo – Baron Munchausen
- 2002 – O Beijo do Vampiro – Nosferatu
- 2003 – A Casa das Sete Mulheres – Araújo Ribeiro
- 2004 – Da Cor do Pecado – Eduardo Campos Sodré (Edu)
- 2005 – Bang Bang – Aquarius Lane
- 2007 – O Sistema – Nicolas Katedref
- 2007 – Faça Sua História – Pai Creuzo
- 2008 – Casos e Acasos – Walmor
- 2008 – Negócio da China – Edmar Silvestre
- 2010 – S.O.S. Emergência – Dr. Solano
- 2011 – A Grande Família – Fred Marques
- 2013 – Alexandre e Outros Heróis – Alexandre

=== Cinema ===
- 1969 – Audácia: A Fúria dos Desejos
- 1973 – A Noite do Desejo – Toninho
- 1974 – Sedução
- 1976 – Deixa Amorzinho... Deixa – Dino/Dalma
- 1976 – Anchieta, José do Brasil – Anchieta
- 1978 – O Grande Desbum
- 1979 – Uma Estranha História de Amor – Daniel
- 1981 – O Beijo no Asfalto – Arandir
- 1982 – Heart and Guts – priest
- 1984 – A Mulher do Atirador de Facas
- 1985 – Ópera do Malandro – Tigrão
- 1986 – Ele, o Boto – Rufino
- 1987 – A Fábula da Bela Palomera – Orestes
- 1989 – Festa – Actor
- 1994 – Dente Por Dente
- 1995 – Brevíssimas Histórias da Gente de Santos
- 1995 – Carlota Joaquina, Princess of Brazil – Jean-Baptiste Debret
- 1996 – For All – o Trampolim da Vitória
- 2001 – Minha Vida em Suas Mãos – Analyst
- 2003 – Viva Sapato! – Claudionor
- 2004 – O Diabo a Quatro – Senator Heitor Furtado
- 2006 – Irma Vap – o Retorno – Darci/Odete Lopes
- 2009 – Topografia de Um Desnudo – Manoel

=== Theater ===
- 1965 – Reportagem de Um Tempo Mau
- 1970 – Hair
- 1972 – Jesus Christ Superstar
- 1973 – Bodas de Sangue
- 1975 – A Mandrágora
- 1983 – King Lear
- 1986/97 – The Mystery of Irma Vep
- 1994 – O Médico e o Monstro
- 1995 – Don Juan
- 1996 – Quartett
- 1999 – O Martelo
- 2000 – 3 x Teatro
- 2011 – A Escola do Escândalo
- 2022 – Seu Neyla

== Awards ==
- São Paulo Association of Art Critics (APCA)

- Troféu APCA (1984) (Best television actor)

- Contigo! Magazine

- Contigo! Award (1998) (Best villain, as Silas Vadan in Zazá)
