= Andando nas Nuvens =

- Created by: Euclydes Marinho
- Starring: Marco Nanini; Vivianne Pasmanter; Cláudio Marzo; Susana Vieira; Renata Sorrah; Débora Bloch; Marcos Palmeira; Marcelo Novaes; Caio Blat; Mariana Ximenes; Júlia Lemmertz; Nicete Bruno; Eliane Giardini; Isabela Garcia; Felipe Camargo; Otávio Augusto see more
- Opening theme: Gulosa by Fat Family
- Country of origin: Brazil
- Original language: Portuguese
- No. of episodes: 197

Production
- Producer: Dênis Carvalho
- Running time: approx. 50 minutes

Original release
- Network: Rede Globo
- Release: 22 March – 5 November 1999

Andando nas Nuvens (English: Walking on Clouds) is a Brazilian telenovela produced and broadcast by Rede Globo which originally ran from March 22 to November 5, 1999, for 197 episodes.

== Cast ==
Actor/Actress	Character
Marco Nanini	Otávio Montana
Cláudio Marzo	Antônio San Marino
Débora Bloch	Júlia Montana
Marcos Palmeira	Chico Mota
Vivianne Pasmanter	Elisabete Montana Rocha
Renata Sorrah	Eva Montana / Condessa Astrid Van Brandenburg
Marcello Novaes	Raul Pedreira
Júlia Lemmertz	Lúcia Helena
Bruna Lombardi	Frida
Felipe Camargo	Bob Lacerda
Nicette Bruno	Judite Mota
Eliane Giardini	Janete Mota
Márcio Garcia	Arnaldo San Marino
Suzana Vieira	Gonçala San Marino
Isabela Garcia	Oneide
Otávio Augusto	Alex
Helena Ranaldi	Dra. Lídia Leblon
Hugo Carvana	Wagner Macieira
Lúcia Veríssimo	Flora
Taumaturgo Ferreira	Átila
Caio Blat	Tiago San Marino
Mariana Ximenes	Celi Montana
Ana Beatriz Nogueira	Marta
Otávio Muller	Dino Israel
Antônio Pedro	Jacques Delon
Tony Tornado	Tião Alemão
Fernanda Souza	Joana
Dalton Vigh	Cícero
Antônio Abujamra	Álvaro Luís Gomes
Carla Regina	Ana Paula
Thalma de Freitas	Zezé
Virgínia Cavendish	Patrycia
Tonico Pereira	Torquato
Carlos Evelyn	Nicolau
José D'Artagnan Júnior	Arnon
Sílvio Guindane	MC Clayton
Ary França	Juvenal
Isabel Guéron	Valéria
Gabriela Martins	Constancinha
Pedro Brício	Lula
Ivone Hoffman	Zelda
Sebastião Vasconcelos	Hélio Arantes

=== Supporting cast ===
- Marcos Oliveira as Vantuir
- José Dartagnan as Arnon
- Andressa Koetz as Hannah
- Luciana Migliaccio as Gisela
- Karla Karenina as Iracema
- Nilton Bicudo as Rolando Bicalho
- Otávio Domit as Mário Bernardo
- Jorge Neves as Serginho
- Ary Coslov as Gregório Montana / waiter
- Guil Silveira as Maitre D'
- Milton Gonçalves as Delegado Serafim
- Dennis Carvalho as Almirante (voice)

== Awards ==
- Prêmio Jornal dos Clubes
  - Revelation: Mariana Ximenes
- Magnífico Award
  - Revelation: Mariana Ximenes
- Prêmio Qualidade Brasil
  - Biggest revelation: Mariana Ximenes
- Melhores do Ano
  - Best actor: Marco Nanini
