= Tonico Pereira =

Brazilian actor

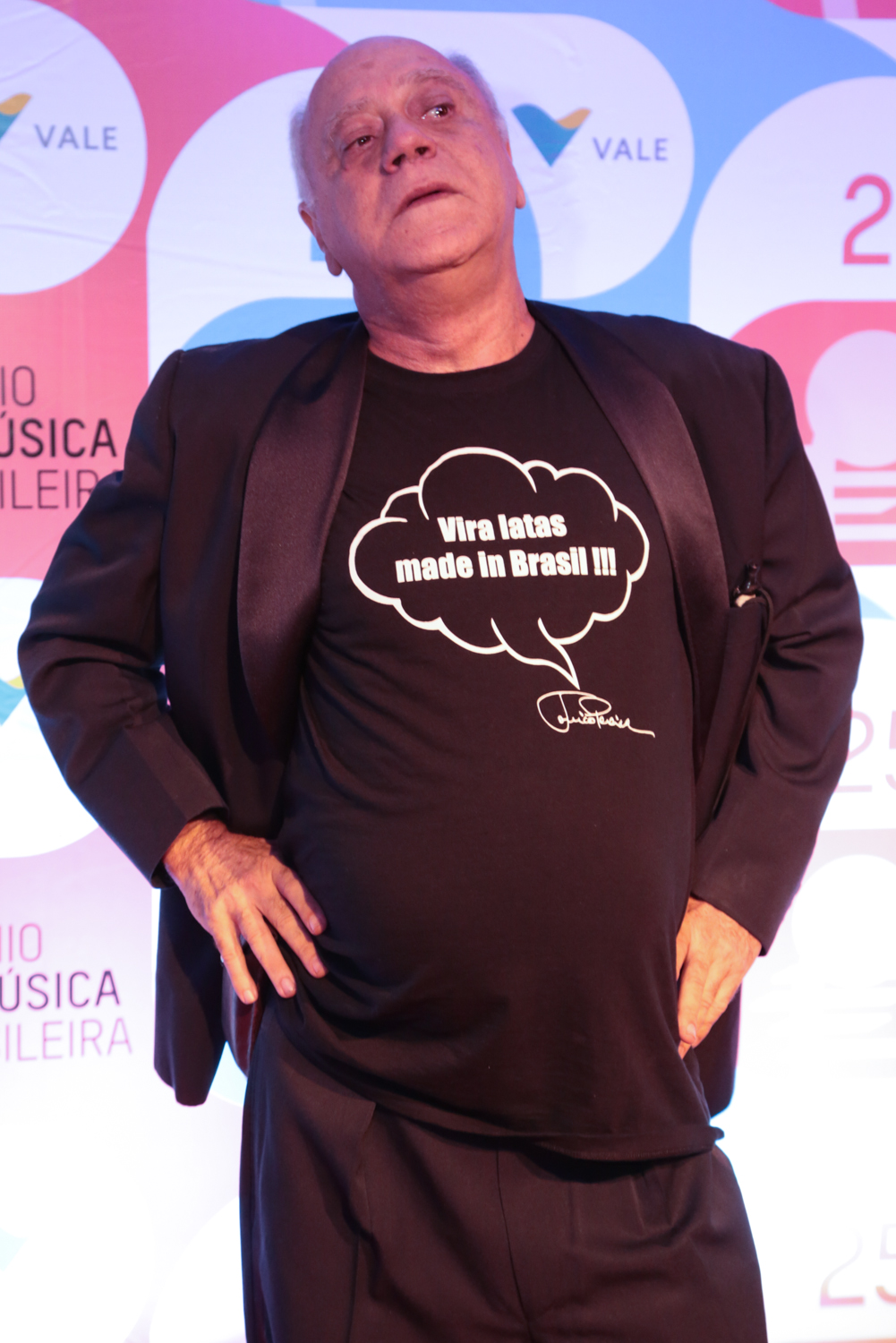
- Tonico at the 25th Brazilian Music Award in 2014.
- Born: Antônio Carlos de Sousa Pereira; 22 June 1948 (age 77); Campos dos Goytacazes, Rio de Janeiro
- Education: Fluminense Federal University
- Occupation: Actor Comedian Businessman Writer
- Years active: 1968–present
- Known for: Tonico
- Notable work: Zé Carneiro in Sítio do Picapau Amarelo; Mendonça in A Grande Família; Dimas/Pedro in The Blind Man Who Shouted Light

Antônio Carlos de Sousa Pereira (born 22 June 1948), better known as Tonico Pereira, is a Brazilian television and film actor.

== Filmography ==
| Year | Title | Role | Notes |
|---|---|---|---|
| 1975 | As Aventuras Amorosas de Um Padeiro | | |
| 1976 | The Fall | | |
| 1976 | Crueldade Mortal | Nozinho | |
| 1978 | The Lyre of Delight | | |
| 1979 | A República dos Assassinos | | |
| 1979 | O Coronel e o Lobisomem | | |
| 1984 | Memoirs of Prison | Desidério | |
| 1984 | Nunca Fomos tão Felizes | Policial | |
| 1985 | O Rei do Rio | | |
| 1986 | The Man in the Black Cape | Bereco | |
| 1987 | The Story of Fausta | | |
| 1987 | Ele, o Boto | | |
| 1987 | Running Out of Luck | Truck Driver | |
| 1988 | Dedé Mamata | Jacques | |
| 1988 | Fábula de La Bella Palomera | | |
| 1990 | Corpo e Delito | | |
| 1990 | Círculo de Fogo | | |
| 1990 | The 5th Monkey | Second Man | |
| 1991 | Vai Trabalhar Vagabundo II - A Volta | Palhaço | |
| 1991 | A Grande Arte | Rafael, the Henchman | |
| 1994 | Menino Maluquinho | Motorista | |
| 1994 | Era Uma Vez... | Rei Turíbio | |
| 1994 | Erotique | | Segment "Final Call" |
| 1996 | O Guarani | Aires | |
| 1997 | O Cego que Gritava Luz | Dimas/Pedro | |
| 1997 | Guerra de Canudos | Coronel Moreira César | |
| 1998 | Como Ser Solteiro | | |
| 1998 | Policarpo Quaresma, Herói do Brasil | Bustamante | |
| 1998 | Midnight | Carcereiro | |
| 1998 | Traição | Jordão | |
| 1999 | No Coração dos Deuses | Cirineu | |
| 2000 | A Hora Marcada | Beltrano | |
| 2001 | Copacabana | Raimundo | |
| 2001 | Caramuru: A Invenção do Brasil | Itaparica | |
| 2002 | Querido Estranho | Manoel | |
| 2003 | Clandestinidade | | |
| 2003 | Maria, Mãe do Filho de Deus | Herodes | |
| 2004 | Um Show de Verão | Seu Cisco | |
| 2004 | Almost Brothers | Head of Prison | |
| 2004 | Redeemer | Delegado | |
| 2004 | O Veneno da Madrugada | Barbeiro | |
| 2005 | O Coronel e o Lobisomem | Seu Padilha | |
| 2006 | Brasília 18% | Emílio de Menezes | |
| 2007 | Saneamento Básico | Seu Antônio | |
| 2011 | Federal Bank Heist | Doctor | |
| 2011 | The Clown | | |
| 2014 | Rio, I Love You | Fernando | |

== TV work ==
| Year | Title | Role | Notes |
|---|---|---|---|
| 1977 | Sítio do Picapau Amarelo | Zé Carneiro | |
| 1986 | Anos Dourados | Ronaldo | |
| 1987 | O Outro | Nininho Americano | |
| 1988 | Bebê a Bordo | Válter | Cameo |
| 1989 | O Sexo dos Anjos | Aranha | |
| 1992 | De Corpo e Alma | Vado | |
| 1993 | Fera Ferida | Chico Tirana | |
| 1995 | Engraçadinha, Seus Amores e Seus Pecados | Xavier | Miniseries |
| 1997 | O Amor Está no Ar | Chicão | |
| 1997 | Por Amor | Oscar (paizinho) | |
| 1999 | Andando nas Nuvens | Torquato | |
| 2001 | Porto dos Milagres | Francisco Vieira (Chico) | |
| 2002 | Desejos de Mulher | Kléber | |
| 2007 | Amazônia, de Gálvez a Chico Mendes | Genivaldo | |
| 2015–2016 | A Regra do Jogo | Ascâncio | |
| 2019 | A Dona do Pedaço | João Francisco Ferreira "Chico" | |
| 2021 | Um Lugar ao Sol | Romero | |
| 2023 | Amor Perfeito | Friar Leão | |
| 2024–2025 | Volta por Cima | Eurico Moreira "Seu Moreira" | |
