= A Dog's Will =

2000 film by Guel Arraes

- Theatrical release poster
- Portuguese: O Auto da Compadecida
- Directed by: Guel Arraes
- Screenplay by: Adriana Falcão; Guel Arraes; João Falcão
- Based on: Auto da Compadecida by Ariano Suassuna
- Produced by: André Cômodo
- Starring: Matheus Nachtergaele; Selton Mello; Fernanda Montenegro
- Cinematography: Félix Monti
- Edited by: Ubiraci Motta; Paulo Henrique Farias
- Music by: Grupo Sá Grama; Sérgio Campelo
- Production companies: Globo Filmes; Lereby Produções
- Distributed by: Columbia TriStar Film Distributors International
- Release date: 10 September 2000
- Running time: 104 minutes
- Country: Brazil
- Languages: Portuguese; Latin
- Box office: R$11,496,994 ($4,903,192)

A Dog's Will (Portuguese: O Auto da Compadecida, lit. 'The Compassionate Woman's Play', the woman being the Virgin Mary) is a 2000 Brazilian fantasy comedy film directed by Guel Arraes, who co-wrote the screenplay with Adriana Falcão and João Falcão. It is based on a similarly named play by Ariano Suassuna, with elements of some other of Suassuna's plays, The Ghost and the Sow and Torture of a Heart. The film stars Matheus Nachtergaele, Selton Mello and Fernanda Montenegro, with Rogério Cardoso, Denise Fraga, Diogo Vilela, Marco Nanini, Lima Duarte and Luís Melo in supporting roles.

A sequel, O Auto da Compadecida 2, was released in Brazil on 25 December 2024, with Nachtergaele and Mello reprising their roles.

== Plot ==
João Grilo (Note: Referred to as "Jack the Cricket” in the English subtitles.) and Chicó are two poor men living in an arid, desert-like region of Northeast Brazil in the 1930s. João is constantly hungry and malnourished, relying on his charm and silver tongue to fool the townsfolk for his own gain. Chicó is a handsome but cowardly man who tells tall tales about his past.

Upon arriving in Taperoá, the two look for work from the town's baker. The baker's wife, Dora, dotes on her dog, who is fed luxurious food. When João and Chicó steal the dog's food, it accidentally eats theirs and quickly falls ill. Desperate for help, Dora begs the duo to have the priest to bless her dog. João first attempts to convince the priest to bless the dog by saying it is owned by Major Antônio Morais, a wealthy landowner in the area, and later has the priest perform funeral rites for the dog by saying it left the church money in its will. The Bishop, initially infuriated at the priest for this, walks back immediately once he learns he is able to take some of the money.

Dora seduces Chicó and attempts to sleep with him before being visited by her other suitor, the town bully Vicentão, and then her husband. João takes a job assisting Major Antônio Morais and his daughter Rosinha, who is in town seeking a blessing from the priest. Vicentão and Corporal Setenta are smitten with Rosinha, but she immediately falls in love with Chicó. Morais wants to marry off Rosinha to a rich man and promises a dowry of a piggy bank filled with coins as left by her grandmother. João devises a plan to pit Vicentão and Corporal Setenta against each other which leaves Chicó the last suitor standing. Dressed up as a wealthy and educated man, Chicó asks for Rosinha's hand in marriage from Morais but Chicó talks him into paying 200 crowns to the priest for church renovations. Morais decides to pay for the renovations on Chicó's behalf, but he requests the “skin off his back” in the case that Chicó should fail to pay him back.

Unable to pay the debt, the duo make a plan to fake Chicó's death with a blood filled balloon with João riding into town pretending to be a bandit. On the day, actual bandits, led by the ferocious Severino, a notorious cangaceiro raid the town and begin looting and killing. Severino rounds up the baker and his wife, the two church leaders, and João and Chicó, planning to shoot them all outside of the church. João decides to trick Severino into believing that his harmonica was blessed by Padre Cícero, whom Severino is devoted to, and brings people killed by injuries back to life. To convince Severino, he stabs Chicó in the blood-filled balloon and Chicó plays dead and then “resurrects” and dances in perfect vigor after João plays the instrument. Severino agrees to be shot, dying from the injury, when the harmonica fails to revive him when played by one of his men. Enraged, the man shoots João, who then dies from blood loss.

Arriving in the afterlife, the six dead are all placed under trial by the Devil. João begs for defense and this brings in Jesus Christ and Virgin Mary, the latter of whom finds reasons for the accused to not be sentenced to Hell. Before being executed, the baker forgave his wife for her adultery and the two church leaders forgave those who shot them - enough for them to land in Purgatory instead of Hell. Given Severino fell into his bandit ways from a mental collapse when police members killed his family as a child, he is absolved for insanity, and his crimes are considered an instrument of Divine providence. The Devil attempts to take João to Hell, but he is granted a second chance at life having been a poor but hopeful man his entire life.

Upon reviving, João discovers Chicó had promised to donate all the money taken from the dead townsfolk in the name of the Virgin Mary if he returned, and he begrudgingly does so. Chicó and Rosinha get married, attempting to use the dowry to pay off his debt, but it ends up being filled with coins of an older (and discontinued) currency. Using a technicality (that the skin off his back should not come with a drop of blood), they manage to evade their debt. All three now penniless, they bump into Jesus Christ posing as a hungry man on the road and share their bread with him after convincing João.

== Cast ==
- Matheus Nachtergaele as João Grilo (Jack the Cricket)
- Selton Mello as Chicó
- Fernanda Montenegro as Virgin Mary
- Marco Nanini as Cangaceiro Severino de Aracaju
- Denise Fraga as Dora
- Lima Duarte as Bishop
- Rogério Cardoso as priest João
- Diogo Vilela as Eurico
- Maurício Gonçalves as Jesus Christ
- Virginia Cavendish as Rosinha
- Paulo Goulart as Major Antônio Morais
- Luís Melo as the Devil
- Bruno Garcia as Vicentão
- Enrique Diaz as Severino's henchman
- Aramis Trindade as Corporal Setenta

== Reception ==
The film was a critical and commercial success in Brazil, receiving four awards at the 2nd Grande Prêmio Cinema Brasil and grossing R$11,496,994 ($4,903,192) with a 2,157,166 viewership.

== See also ==
- Our Lady of Aparecida
- Lisbela e o Prisioneiro
