= Isle of Flowers =

1989 film directed by Jorge Furtado

- Directed by: Jorge Furtado
- Written by: Jorge Furtado
- Produced by: Nora Goulart and Monica Schmiedt
- Starring: Júlia Barth
- Narrated by: Paulo José
- Edited by: Giba Assis Brasil
- Music by: Geraldo Flach
- Release date: 17 January 1989
- Running time: 12 min 31 sec
- Country: Brazil
- Language: Portuguese

Isle of Flowers (Portuguese: Ilha das Flores) is a 1989 Brazilian short film by Jorge Furtado. It tracks the path of a tomato from grower to the child who collects it as food from a dump with the help of voiceover and a collection of illustrative images. The director stated the film was inspired by the works of Kurt Vonnegut and Alain Resnais, among others.

In 1995, Isle of Flowers was chosen by the European critics as one of the 100 most important short films of the century.

== Plot ==
A constant and verbose off-camera narrator guides the viewer through the life of a tomato. Beginning at Mr Suzuki's tomato field, the tomato is then sold to a supermarket, where it is acquired by Mrs Anete, a perfume salesperson, together with some pork. Each exchange requires the presence of money, which is, together with the tomato, the constant element in the story.

Mrs Anete intends to prepare a tomato sauce for the pork, but, having considered one of Mr Suzuki's tomatoes inadequate, she throws it in the garbage. Together with the rest of the garbage, the tomato is taken to Isle of Flowers (Ilha das Flores), Porto Alegre's landfill. There, the organic material considered adequate is selected as food for pigs. The rest, which is considered inadequate for the pigs, is given to poor women and children to eat.

== Cast ==
- Paulo José as narrator
- Ciça Reckziegel as Dona Anete
- Luciana Azevedo as Ana Luizia Nunes
- Irene Schmidt as the client
- Takahiro Suzuki as Sr. Suzuki

== Production ==
The scene of the perfume factory was actually shot in a high school laboratory (Colégio Anchieta).

== Reception ==
=== Public ===
Since its release, Isle of Flowers has become one of the most acclaimed pseudo-documentary short films of all time. For a number of years, users of the Internet Movie Database voted it the best Brazilian short film and documentary film ever made.

=== Awards ===
Isle of Flowers was very well received by film festivals all over the world when first released. It won a Silver Bear for Best Short Feature at the 1990 Berlin Film Festival as well as nine awards at the 1989 Gramado Film Festival, including for Best Short Film.
