= Jorge Furtado =

Brazilian film and television director and screenwriter

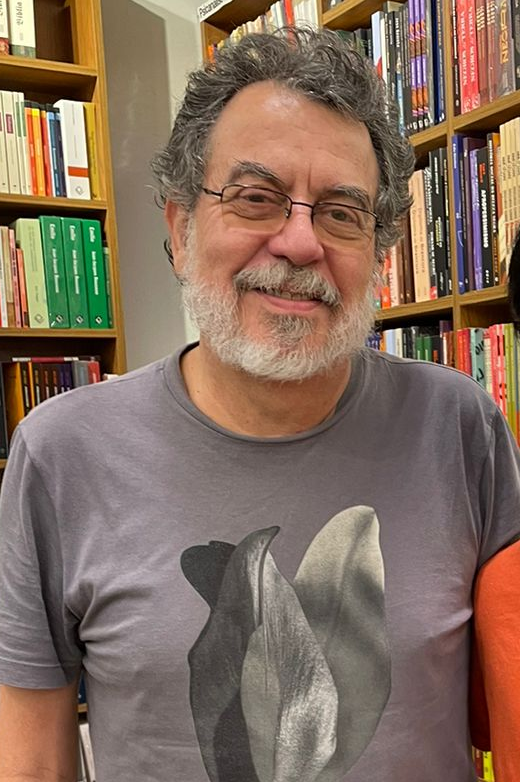
- Furtado in 2022
- Born: Jorge Alberto Furtado; June 9, 1959 (age 67); Porto Alegre, Rio Grande do Sul, Brazil
- Occupations: Screenwriter, director

Jorge Alberto Furtado (born June 9, 1959) is a Brazilian film and television director and screenwriter.

== Life and career ==
Jorge Furtado is the son of Dercy Furtado (1927–2024), the first woman elected to the Municipal Chamber of Porto Alegre in history, and Jorge Alberto Jacobus Furtado (1924–1999), a professor and administrator. He has five siblings - Cláudio, Sérgio, Nina, Maria da Graça, and Thaís.

Furtado attended university for courses in medicine, psychology, journalism and arts, but did not graduate. He began his professional career in the 1980s on a local channel TVE-RS working as reporter, presenter, editor, screenwriter and producer. In 1982 he created a TV show, Quizumba, that mixed fiction and documentary with very audacious language for the Brazilian public television.

Between 1984 and 1986, Furtado was director of the museum Museu de Comunicação Social Hipólito José da Costa in Porto Alegre. At the same time, with the help of José Pedro Goulart and Ana Luiza Azevedo, he created the company Luz Produções, where he made two short films and produced plays for theater. From 1986 to 1990, he made dozens of TV commercials.

In 1987, he was one of the founders of Casa de Cinema de Porto Alegre, in which he still participates. In 1990, he worked on TV Globo, making scripts for many TV series.

In 2008, Harvard University promoted an exhibition of his films called "Jorge Furtado's Porto Alegre".

== Filmography ==
=== Film ===
Year	Film	Director	Writer	Notes
1984	Temporal	Yes	Yes	Short film
1986	O Dia em que Dorival Encarou a Guarda	Yes	Yes	Short film
1988	Barbosa	Yes	Yes	Short film
1989	Isle of Flowers	Yes	Yes	Short film
1990	Memória	No	Yes	Short film
1991	Esta Não é a Sua Vida	Yes	Yes	Short film
1994	Veja Bem	Yes	Yes	Short film
1994	A Matadeira	Yes	Yes	Short film
1995	Estrada	Yes	Yes	Short film
1997	Ângelo Anda Sumido	Yes	Yes	Short film
1999	Três Minutos	No	Yes	Short film
2000	O Sanduíche	Yes	Yes	Short film
2000	Tolerance	No	Yes	
2001	Caramuru: A Invenção do Brasil	No	Yes	
2002	Houve uma Vez Dois Verões	Yes	Yes	
2003	Benjamim	No	Yes	
2003	The Man Who Copied	Yes	Yes	
2003	Lisbela e o Prisioneiro	No	Yes	
2004	Oscar Boz	Yes	Yes	Short film
2004	Meu Tio Matou um Cara	Yes	Yes	
2005	O Coronel e o Lobisomem	No	Yes	
2007	Saneamento Básico	Yes	Yes	
2007	Rummikub	Yes	Yes	Short film
2010	Antes Que o Mundo Acabe	No	Yes	
2010	Velazquez e a Teoria Quântica da Gravidade	Yes	Yes	Short film
2010	Até a Vista	Yes	Yes	Short film
2014	O Mercado de Notícias	Yes	Yes	
2015	Real Beleza	Yes	Yes	
2018	Rasga Coração	Yes	Yes	
2024	Virgínia e Adelaide	Yes	Yes	

=== Television ===
Year	Film	Director	Writer	Notes
1993	Agosto	No	Yes	
1994	Memorial de Maria Moura	No	Yes	
1995	A Comédia da Vida Privada	Yes	Yes	
1997	Anchietanos	Yes	Yes	Television film
1999	Luna Caliente	Yes	Yes	
2000	A Invenção do Brasil	No	Yes	
2000	Brava Gente	Yes	Yes	Episode: "Meia Encarnada Dura de Sangue"
2001	Os Normais	No	Yes	2 episodes
2008–2009	Ó Paí, Ó	No	Yes	10 episodes
2009	Decamerão: A Comédia do Sexo	Yes	Yes	
2011	A Mulher Invisível	No	Yes	1 episode
2011	Homens de Bem	Yes	Yes	Television film
2011–2013	A História do Amor	Yes	Yes	
2012	Doce de Mãe	Yes	Yes	Television film
2014	Doce de Mãe	Yes	Yes	
2015	Mister Brau	No	Yes	
2016	Nada Será Como Antes	No	Yes	
2017	Sob Pressão	No	Yes	3 episodes
2020	Todas as Mulheres do Mundo	No	Yes	
2020	Amor e Sorte	No	Yes	

== Awards ==
- 2003: "Grande Prêmio Cinema Brasil" as best director and best original script for The Man Who Copied.
- 2003: Best script on the "Brazilian Film Festival of Miami", for The Man Who Copied.
- 2003: Critics' award on the "Festival Internacional de Punta del Este" for The Man Who Copied.
- 2004: Prêmio ACIE de Cinema for Best Picture for The Man Who Copied.
- 2002: "Grande Prêmio Cinema Brasil" for best original script with Two summers.
- 2002: Best movie award on "Cine Ceará" for Two Summers.
- 2002: Best director award on "Cine Ceará" for Two Summers.
- 2002: Best movie award on "Festival de Cinema Brasileiro" in Paris, for Two Summers.
- 1995: "Kikito" of Best Brazilian movie on the "Festival de Gramado" for Felicidade é….
- 1989: Best short movie on the Berlin International Film Festival for Island of Flowers.
- 1988: Best short movie on the Havana Film Festival for Barbosa.
- 1986: Best short movie on the festivals of Gramado, Havana and Huelva, with The Day Dorival Faced the Guards.

== See also ==
- Cinema of Brazil
- Lists of Brazilian films
- List of Brazilian directors
