= Vanessa Gerbelli =

Brazilian actress

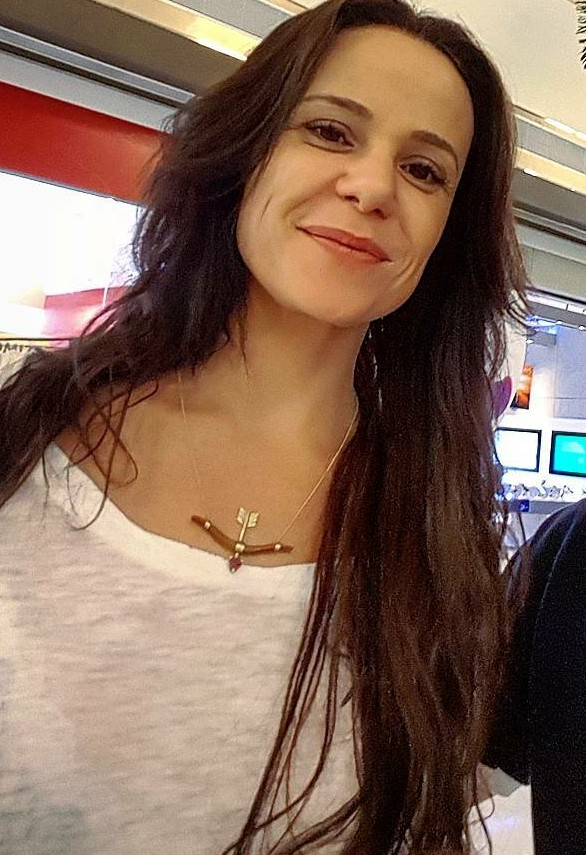
- Gerbelli in 2019
- Born: Vanessa Gerbelli Ceroni; August 6, 1973 (age 52); São Bernardo do Campo, São Paulo, Brazil
- Occupation: Actress

Vanessa Gerbelli Ceroni (born August 6, 1973) is a Brazilian actress.

== Selected filmography ==
Television

- 2000 - Brava Gente - Sucena
- 2000 - O Cravo e a Rosa - Lindinha
- 2002 - Desejos de Mulher - Gonçala
- 2003 - Mulheres Apaixonadas - Fernanda
- 2003 - Kubanacan - Amapola
- 2004 - Da Cor do Pecado - Tancinha
- 2004 - Cabocla - Rosa Adib
- 2005 - Prova de Amor - Elza
- 2007 - Amor e Intrigas - Alice
- 2011 - Vidas em Jogo - Divina
- 2014 - Em Família - Juliana
- 2015 - Sete Vidas - Marina
- 2018 - Jesus (Nóvela) - Herodias

Cinema

- 2003 - Carandiru - Célia
- 2006 - Os Desafinados - Dora
- 2007 - Sem Controle - Márcia
- 2011 - As Mães de Chico Xavier - Elisa
- 2012 - Paixão e Acaso - Inês
- 2019 -Socorro, Virei Uma Garota! - Helena
- 2024 - Nosso Lar 2: Os Mensageiros
