= O Cravo e a Rosa =

Brazilian telenovela

- Also known as: The Thorn and the Rose; El Clavel y la Rosa
- Genre: Telenovela
- Created by: Walcyr Carrasco; Mário Teixeira
- Based on: The Taming of the Shrew; William Shakespeare; O Machão by Ivani Ribeiro
- Directed by: Dennis Carvalho; Walter Avancini
- Starring: Adriana Esteves; Eduardo Moscovis; Leandra Leal; Luís Melo; Suely Franco; Luiz Antônio do Nascimento; Ângelo Antônio; Júlio Levy; Vanessa Gerbelli; Pedro Paulo Rangel; Ana Lúcia Torre; Taumaturgo Ferreira; Tássia Camargo; Ney Latorraca; Maria Padilha; Bia Nunnes; Rodrigo Faro; Eva Todor see more
- Opening theme: Jura by Zeca Pagodinho
- Ending theme: Jura by Zeca Pagodinho
- Country of origin: Brazil
- Original language: Portuguese
- No. of episodes: 221

Production
- Production location: Brazil
- Running time: 45 minutes

Original release
- Network: Rede Globo
- Release: 26 June 2000 – 10 March 2001

Related
- Esplendor; Estrela-Guia

O Cravo e a Rosa (English: The Thorn and the Rose) is a Brazilian telenovela produced and broadcast by Rede Globo. It premiered on 26 June 2000 and ran until 10 March 2001. It is based on the Shakespearean comedy The Taming of the Shrew.

== Plot ==
The plot involves a single farmer who needs money to save his land, and a wealthy politician who is willing to get his oldest daughter married at any cost. The plan is complicated by the politician's daughter, who is a feminist who rejects the role of a housewife.

This romantic comedy is set in the 1920s, and inspired by The Taming of the Shrew by William Shakespeare.

== Cast ==
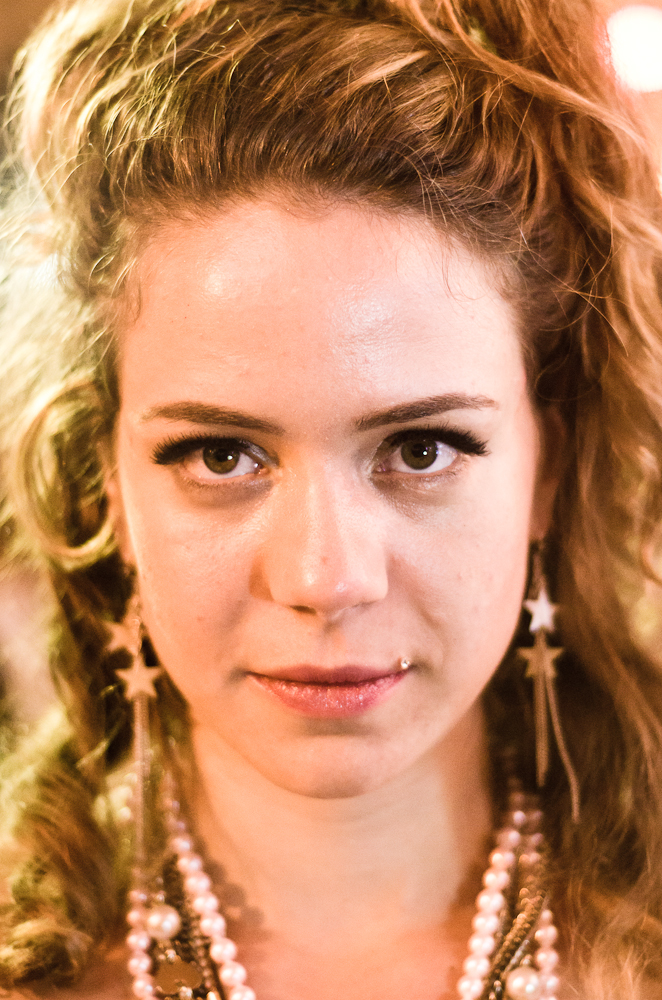
Leandra Leal as Bianca.

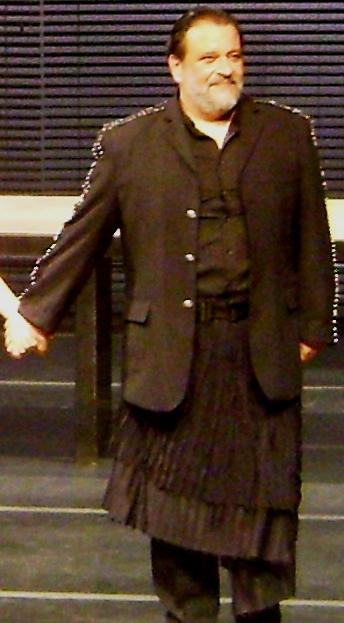
Luís Melo as Batista.

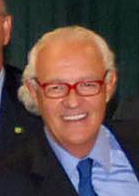
Ney Latorraca as Cornélio.

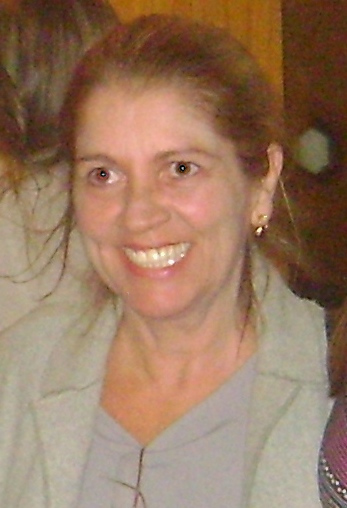
Tássia Camargo as Joana.

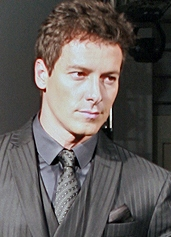
Rodrigo Faro as Heitor.

| Actor | Role |
|---|---|
| Adriana Esteves | Catarina Batista |
| Eduardo Moscovis | Julião Petruchio |
| Drica Moraes | Marcela Almeida / Muriel |
| Leandra Leal | Bianca Batista |
| Ângelo Antônio | Prof. Edmundo das Neves |
| Luís Melo | Nicanor Batista / Manoel |
| Maria Padilha | Dinorá de Moura Valente |
| Ney Latorraca | Cornélio Valente |
| Tássia Camargo | Joana |
| Rodrigo Faro | Heitor Lacerda de Moura |
| Eva Todor | Josefa Lacerda de Moura / Desirée |
| Carlos Vereza | Joaquim Almeida |
| Taumaturgo Ferreira | Januário dos Santos |
| Vanessa Gerbelli | Lindinha |
| Pedro Paulo Rangel | Calixto |
| Suely Franco | Mimosa |
| Murilo Rosa | Celso de Luca |
| Ana Lúcia Torre | Leonor Fernandes (Neca) |
| João Vitti | Jornalista Serafim Amaral Tourinho |
| Carlos Evelyn | Fábio Moreira (Mudinho) |
| Bia Nunnes | Dalva Lacerda Pinto |
| Miriam Freeland | Cândida Lacerda (Candoca) |
| Carla Daniel | Lourdes de Castro |
| Virgínia Cavendish | Bárbara Maciel |
| Rejane Arruda | Maria Quitera de Andrade(Kiki) |
| Déo Garcez | Ezequiel |
| Matheus Petinatti | Teodoro |
| Bernadeth Lyzio | Berenice |
| Luiz Antônio | Buscapé |
| Taís Müller | Fátima |
| João Capelli | Jorginho |
| Júlio Levy | Cosme |
| Paulo Hesse | delegado Sansão Farias |
| Sérgio Módena | Ignácio |
| Gláucio Gomes | gerente do hotel |
| Roney Villela | Jack |
| Jamaica Magalhães | Benedita |
| Rosane Corrêa | Etelvina |
| Cláudio Corrêa e Castro | Normando Castor |
| Lúcia Alves | Dra. Hildegard |
| Isaac Bardavid | Felisberto |
| Nelson Xavier | Dr. Caio |
| Nizo Neto | François |
| Alexandre Barillari | Manoel |
| Nildo Parente | Nildo |
| Raymundo de Souza | Detective |
| Henrique César | Ursulino |

== Opening ==
The opening song is Jura, by Zeca Pagodinho.

== Ratings ==
O Cravo e a Rosa aired at 6:00 p.m. and had an overall average rating of 30.6 points.

== Soundtrack ==
Cover: Leandra Leal

1. "Jura" - Zeca Pagodinho (Opening theme)
2. "Olha o que o Amor Me Faz" - Sandy & Junior
3. "O Cravo e a Rosa" - Jair Rodrigues
4. "Nada Sério" - Joanna
5. "Tristeza do Jeca" - Sérgio Reis
6. "Mississippi Raq" - Claude Bolling
7. "Quem Toma Conta de Mim (Someone To Watch Over Me)" - Paula Toller
8. "Lua Branca" - Verônica Sabino
9. "Odeon" - Sérgio Saraceni
10. "Coquette" - Guy Lombardo
11. "Tua Boca" - Belo
12. "Tea For Two" - Ella Fitzgerald & Count Basie
13. "Rain" - Sérgio Saraceni
14. "On The Mississippi" - Claude Bolling

== Foreign run ==
O Cravo e a Rosa aired on Canal 9 (Argentina) and Portugal's Sociedade Independente de Comunicação and RTP Internacional.

| Preceded by Esplendor; 31 January 2000–23 June 2000 | Globo 6 p.m. timeslot telenovela 26 June 2000–10 March 2001 | Succeeded by Estrela-Guia; 12 March 2001–15 June 2001 |
