= Lisbela e o Prisioneiro =

2003 film directed by Guel Arraes

- Theatrical release poster
- Directed by: Guel Arraes
- Screenplay by: Guel Arraes; Pedro Cardoso; Jorge Furtado
- Based on: Lisbela e o Prisioneiro by Osman Lins
- Produced by: Paula Lavigne
- Starring: Selton Mello; Débora Falabella
- Cinematography: Ulrich Burtin
- Edited by: Paulo Henrique Farias
- Music by: João Falcão
- Production companies: Natasha Filmes; Globo Filmes; Estúdios Mega
- Distributed by: 20th Century Fox
- Release date: August 22, 2003 (Brazil)
- Running time: 106 minutes
- Country: Brazil
- Language: Portuguese
- Box office: R$19,915,933 ($8,494,742)

Lisbela e o Prisioneiro (Lisbela and the Prisoner) is a 2003 Brazilian romantic comedy film directed by Guel Arraes, based on the 1964 play of the same name by Osman Lins.

Filming took place in cities of Pernambuco, Igarassu, Paudalho and Recife, as well as in Rio de Janeiro and Nova Iguaçu.

== Plot ==
The film tells the story of the trickster, adventurer and conqueror Leléu and the dreamy girl Lisbela who loves to watch American films and dreams of the movie heroes. The story takes place in the 20th century in Pernambuco. Lisbela (Débora Falabella) is engaged with other man when Leléu (Selton Mello) arrives in the city. The couple is charmed and begins to live a story full of characters taken from the Brazilian northeastern scene: Inaura (Virgínia Cavendish), a married and seductive woman, who tries to lure the hero (Leléu) and betray her husband bully and mercenary killer Frederico Evandro (Marco Nanini); Lieutenant Guedes (André Mattos) a stern father and chief of police; Douglas (Bruno Garcia) a Pernambucano man with Carioca accent and São Paulo's slangs, seen from the perspective of regional humor; and Corporal Citonho (Tadeu Mello) a corporal of detachment, who is cunning enough to satisfy his appetites.

Lisbela and Leléu are going to suffer pressure from her family, the social milieu and also with their own doubts and hesitations. But in a final twist, full of bravery and humor, they follow their destinies. As Lisbela herself says, the fun is not knowing what happens, it is to know how it happens and when it happens.

== Cast ==
- Selton Mello as Leléu
- Débora Falabella as Lisbela
- Virginia Cavendish as Inaura
- Bruno Garcia as Douglas
- Tadeu Mello as Cabo Citonho
- André Mattos as Terente Guedes
- Lívia Falcão as Francisquinha
- Marco Nanini as Frederico Evandro

== Awards ==
=== Won ===
==== 2004 Cinema Brazil Grand Prize ====
- Best Music: (João Falcão and André Moraes)
- Best Actor: (Selton Mello)

==== 2003 Premio Qualidade ====
- Best Actor: (Marco Nanini)
- Best Actress: (Débora Falabella)
- Best Director: (Guel Arraes)
- Best Film
- Best Supporting Actor: (André Mattos)
- Best Supporting Actress: (Virginia Cavendish)

=== Nominated ===
==== 2004 Cinema Brazil Grand Prize ====
- Best Costume Design: (Emilia Duncan)
- Best Director: (Guel Arraes)
- Best Editing: (Paulo Henrique Farias)
- Best Make-Up: (Marlene Moura)
- Best Picture
- Best Screenplay: (Guel Arraes, Jorge Furtado and Pedro Cardoso)
- Best Sound
- Best Supporting Actor: (Bruno Garcia)
- Best Supporting Actor: (Tadeu Mello)
- Best Supporting Actress: (Virginia Cavendish)

==== 2003 Premio Qualidade ====
- Best Supporting Actor: (Tadeo Mello)
- Best Supporting Actor: (André Mattos)

== Soundtrack ==
- "Você Não me Ensinou a te Esquecer" - Written by Fernando Mendes, performed by Caetano Veloso
- "Para o Diabo os Conselhos de Vocês" - Written by Carlos Imperial, performed by Os Condenados
- "A Dança das Borboletas" - Written by Zé Ramalho and Alceu Valença, performed by Zé Ramalho and Sepultura
- "Espumas ao Vento" - Written by Accioly Neto, performed by Elza Soares
- "A Dama de Ouro" - Written by Maciel Melo, performed by Zéu Britto
- "A Deusa da Minha Rua" - Written by Jorge Faraj and Teixeira, performed by Geraldo Maia
- "Oh Carol" - Written by Neil Sedaka, performed by Caetano Veloso and Jorge Mautner
- "O Amor é Filme" - Written by João Falcão, performed by Lirinha
- "Lisbela" - Written by Caetano Veloso, performed by Los Hermanos
- "O Matador" - Written by João Falcão, performed by Sepultura
- "O Boi" - Written by João Falcão.

== See also ==
- A Dog's Will
- Brega (music)
