= Saneamento Básico =

2007 film directed by Jorge Furtado

- Theatrical release poster
- Directed by: Jorge Furtado
- Written by: Jorge Furtado
- Produced by: Guel Arraes; Nora Goulart; Luciana Tomasi
- Starring: Fernanda Torres; Wagner Moura; Camila Pitanga; Bruno Garcia; Lázaro Ramos; Tonico Pereira and Paulo José
- Cinematography: Jacob Solitrenick
- Edited by: Giba Assis Brasil
- Music by: Leo Henkin
- Production companies: Columbia Pictures; Globo Filmes
- Distributed by: Sony Pictures Releasing International
- Release date: July 20, 2007
- Running time: 112 minutes
- Country: Brazil
- Language: Portuguese

Saneamento Básico (Portuguese for "basic sanitation") is a 2007 Brazilian comedy film written and directed by Jorge Furtado. It stars Fernanda Torres, Wagner Moura, Camila Pitanga, Bruno Garcia, Lázaro Ramos, Tonico Pereira and Paulo José.

== Plot ==
The people of Linha Cristal, a fictitious village of Italo-Brazilian descendants in Serra Gaúcha, gather to discuss the construction of a septic tank for sewage treatment. They form a commission which is responsible in ordering the budget to the town hall. The secretary of the mayor recognizes the need of the tank, but informs that there is no budget available. There is, however, R$10,000 available for the production of a film. This money was sent by the federal government and will be sent back if not used soon. The people of Linha Cristal have the idea of using the money to make a low-budget documentary about the construction of the tank, but the film has to be fictitious. Then, they decide to make a science fiction B movie which tells the story of a monster who lives in the building site of a tank.

== Cast ==
- Fernanda Torres as Marina
- Wagner Moura as Joaquim
- Camila Pitanga as Silene
- Bruno Garcia as Fabrício
- Lázaro Ramos as Zico
- Janaína Kremer as Marcela
- Tonico Pereira as Antônio
- Paulo José as Otaviano

== Release ==
=== Critical reception ===
According to Ana Paula Sousa, film reviewer of CartaCapital, Saneamento Básico is one of a few really funny films in recent Brazilian cinema. On the other hand, Dayanne Mikevis, reviewer of Folha de S.Paulo, says the film is a "light entertainment" and a "naïve comedy".

=== Box office ===
As of August 12, 2007, Saneamento Básico had grossed R$1,066,051 and sold over 120,000 tickets in Brazil.
