= Bang Bang (TV series) =

Brazilian 2005 television series

- Genre: Telenovela
- Created by: Mário Prata; Carlos Lombardi
- Written by: Ana Ferreira; Antonio Prata; Reinaldo Moraes; Chico Mattoso; Filipe Miguez; Márcia Prates
- Directed by: José Luiz Villamarim
- Starring: Bruno Garcia; Fernanda Lima; Mauro Mendonça; Joana Fomm; Giulia Gam; Ney Latorraca; Marisa Orth; Carol Castro
- Opening theme: "Malaguena" (instrumental) by The Bambi Molesters
- Country of origin: Brazil
- Original language: Portuguese
- No. of episodes: 173

Production
- Camera setup: Multi-camera

Original release
- Network: TV Globo
- Release: 3 October 2005 – 22 April 2006

Bang Bang is a Brazilian telenovela produced and broadcast by TV Globo. It premiered on 3 October 2005, replacing A Lua Me Disse, and ended on 22 April 2006, replaced by Cobras & Lagartos. The telenovela is created by Mário Prata, who wrote the first thirty-four episodes before leaving due to health problems, and was replaced by Carlos Lombardi. The plot was considered a failure by the press due to the low quality of the story and poor reception.

The telenovela stars Bruno Garcia, Fernanda Lima, Mauro Mendonça, Joana Fomm, Giulia Gam, Ney Latorraca, Marisa Orth, and Carol Castro.

== Cast ==
- Bruno Garcia as Benjamin "Ben" Silver
- Fernanda Lima as Diana Bullock
- Carol Castro as Mercedita Bolívar
- Alinne Moraes as Penny McGold Lane
- Guilherme Berenguer as Neon Bullock
- Mauro Mendonça as Paul Jonathan Bullock
- Giulia Gam as Molly Flanders "Vegas Locomotiv"
- Guilherme Fontes as Jeff Wall Street
- Fernanda de Freitas as Catty McGold Evans
- Joana Fomm as Miriam Viridiana McGold
- Marisa Orth as Ursula McGold Lane
- Ney Latorraca as Aquarius Lane
- Marco Ricca as Xerife Edgard Stuart / Patrik Gogol
- Daniele Suzuki as Yoko Bell
- Ricardo Tozzi as Dr. Harold Phinter "Lobo"
- Babi Xavier as Marilyn Corroy
- Rodrigo Lombardi as Constantino Zoltar
- Kadu Moliterno as Jesse James / Denaide Johnson
- Evandro Mesquita as Billy the Kid / Henaide Johnson
- Angelina Muniz as Violeta Bolívar
- Genézio de Barros as Javier Bolívar
- Cris Bonna as Dorothy McGold Evans
- Jairo Mattos as Donald Evans "Dong Dong"
- Sidney Magal as Clayton Lake / Zorro
- Nair Bello as Leona Lake "Dona Zorra"
- Eliezer Motta as Tonto Comanche
- Thalma de Freitas as Regina da Silva "Baiana"
- Paulo Miklos as Kid Cadillac
- Roney Facchini as Nicola Felinni
- Humberto Carrão as Pablito Bolívar
- Mauren Mcgee as Thabata Corroy
- Raphael Rodrigues as Frederic Smith "Fred Bike-Boy"
- Ariela Massoti as Brenda Lee Flanders
- Anderson Lau as Sheng Leng Junior
- Renato Borghi as Dom Ernest
- Felipe Cardoso as Don
- Cosme dos Santos as Rush
- Renato Consorte as Father Jeremy Hacker
- Maria Helena Velasco as Bizerra
- Rui Rezende as Jack Label
- Tatiana Monteiro as Elga Andersen
- Roumer Calhães as Absurd Boy
- Cláudia Lira as Diva Cardoso Lewis
