= Carlota Joaquina, Princess of Brazil =

1995 film directed by Carla Camurati

- Theatrical release poster
- Directed by: Carla Camurati
- Written by: Carla Camurati; Melanie Dimantas
- Produced by: Bianca de Felippes; Carla Camurati
- Starring: Marieta Severo; Marco Nanini; Marcos Palmeira
- Cinematography: Breno Silveira
- Edited by: Cezar Migliorin; Marta Luz
- Music by: André Abujamra; Armando Souza
- Production company: Elimar Produções Artísticas
- Distributed by: Elimar Produções Artísticas
- Release date: 6 January 1995
- Running time: 100 minutes
- Country: Brazil
- Languages: Portuguese; Spanish; English
- Box office: R$6.4 million ($2,773,342)

Carlota Joaquina, Princess of Brazil (Portuguese: Carlota Joaquina, Princesa do Brazil) is a 1995 Brazilian historical comedy film directed and written by Carla Camurati. It stars Marieta Severo as Carlota Joaquina, Marco Nanini as Dom João VI and Marcos Palmeira as Dom Pedro I.

The film shows Carlota's efforts to conquer her enemies and become a queen. It tells a summarized tale, mixing history with popular folk traditions, from her childhood until her suicide.

== Cast ==
- Marieta Severo as Carlota Joaquina of Spain
- Marco Nanini as John VI of Portugal
- Ludmila Dayer as Yolanda / young Carlota Joaquina
- Maria Fernanda as Maria I of Portugal
- Marcos Palmeira as Pedro I of Brazil
- Beth Goulart as Maria Teresa, Princess of Beira
- Antônio Abujamra as Count of Mata-Porcos
- Eliana Fonseca as Custódia
- Norton Nascimento as Fernando Leão
- Romeu Evaristo as Felisbindo
- Bel Kutner as Francisca
- Aldo Leite as Francisco José Rufino de Sousa Lobato, viscount of Vila Nova da Rainha
- Chris Hieatt as Percy Smythe, 6th Viscount Strangford
- Maria Ceiça as Gertrudes
- Ney Latorraca as Jean-Baptiste Debret
- Vera Holtz as Maria Luisa of Parma
