= Da Cor do Pecado =

Brazilian telenovela by João Emanuel Carneiro

- Also known as: Shades of Sin
- Genre: Telenovela
- Created by: João Emanuel Carneiro
- Written by: João Emanuel Carneiro; Angela Carneiro; Vincent Villari; Vinícius Vianna
- Directed by: Denise Saraceni
- Starring: Taís Araújo; Reynaldo Gianecchini; Giovanna Antonelli; Lima Duarte; Rosi Campos; Aracy Balabanian; Alinne Moraes; Maitê Proença; Ney Latorraca; Graziella Moretto; Matheus Nachtergaele
- Opening theme: "Da Cor do Pecado"
- Composer: Luciana Mello
- Country of origin: Brazil
- Original language: Portuguese
- No. of episodes: 185

Production
- Running time: 45 minutes

Original release
- Network: TV Globo
- Release: 26 January – 28 August 2004

Da Cor do Pecado (English title: Shades of Sin) is a Brazilian telenovela produced and broadcast by TV Globo in the traditional 7pm timeslot between 26 January and 28 August 2004 with a total of 185 episodes, replacing Kubanacan and preceding Começar de Novo.

It is one of Rede Globo's most successful productions, just coming after Avenida Brasil, in terms of viewership and worldwide exhibition, as it been sold to close to 100 countries.

Starring Taís Araújo, Reynaldo Gianecchini, Giovanna Antonelli, Lima Duarte, Rosi Campos, Aracy Balabanian, Guilherme Weber and Tuca Andrada.

== Synopsis ==
=== First phase ===
In the 1970s, businessman Alfonso Lambertini has an affair with a maid of his mansion, Edilásia, and she becomes pregnant. Alfonso is the husband of Silvia, a woman of fragile health whom he loves. Edilásia is pregnant with twin boys but hides it from Alfonso. Germana, the housekeeper and a close friend of Alfonso and Silvia, helps Edilásia flee, leaving one child with Alfonso and taking the other. Shortly after, Silvia dies, and Alfonso is plunged into depression.

Thirty years later, Alfonso's son, Paco, is now a botanist who is very dedicated to his profession and who does not agree with his father's actions, such as deforestation and burning of trees for the sake of establishing his ventures. Paco does not know he has a twin and that his biological mother is Edilásia; he thinks he is the son of Silvia. On a trip to Maranhão, Paco meets Preta, a beautiful black girl from São Luís do Maranhão who sells herbs in a tent with her mother, Lita.

Preta and Paco fall in love at first sight and they exchange vows of eternal passion, but Preta is suspicious of a rich white man, because she is black and poor and knows that a rich white man would use her easily. However, Paco is engaged to Bárbara, a cunning woman who is false, manipulative, cruel, dishonest and very biased; she hates Preta and often refer to Preta as "little blackie".

Meanwhile, Apollo lives with his mother Edilásia and his four half-brothers: Ulisses, Thor, Dionísio and Abelardo on the beach. It is a simple life, but very affectionate. Edilásia is sad to have left another son, Paco, in the hands of a powerful man as Alfonso. Her late husband, Napoleon Sardinha, was a great wrestler and is revered by the whole family, who also practice the sport. Apollo does not know the truth and thinks his father is Napoleon.

The story has other nuclei, such as Vera and Edu, Bárbara's parents who are divorced and who love to pose as wealthy, but are actually each supported by Bárbara. Both fully support the coup on Paco's daughter. Other plots include Moa, a passionate surfer who becomes romantically involved with Apollo, Ulisses, Thor, Dionísio and Abelardo; and Kaíke, Bárbara's lover, blinded by love, who will do anything for her, including traps to separate Preta and Paco.

It is in one of those traps that Paco is disappointed with Preta: Bárbara and Kaíke make it appear that Preta bought almost fifty thousand dollars on appliances and furniture using Paco's credit cards, and even betrayed him. At the same time, Paco learns that Bárbara is pregnant by him - when in fact the child is Kaíke's - and has a big fight with his father. Soon, Paco learns that Bárbara is Kaíke's lover, and becomes furious with her. The snake convinces Paco that Alfonso will intern in a hospital for the insane. All this culminates in a helicopter tour with Paco and Bárbara.

At the same time, Apollo and Ulisses are traveling to Brazil in a sailboat. One night, the brothers host some strange-looking men. Ulisses discovers that they are carrying almost one hundred million dollars in gold stolen from the Group Lambertini. Upon learning that Ulisses discovered this, the men try to kill him, but Apollo stops them and falls into the sea along with all the gold, presumes dead. The men flee. The next morning, Paco, mad with hatred of life, takes the helicopter out to the sea and nearly dies when a piece of iron strikes him in the head. He is saved by Ulisses, who was coincidentally in the same place and believes that Paco is Apollo because the two are completely identical. Paco then proves to that Ulisses that he is not Apollo, and the two are puzzled. Ulisses, however, does not dare tell his mother that her "favorite" son died and suggests that Paco take his place. Seeing a unique opportunity to abandon a life surrounded by deceit and brutality of those who live around them and start a new life from scratch, Paco accepts. At the same time, in Maranhão, Preta has two stories: the first is that Paco, the love of his life, died. The second is that she is pregnant with Paco's child.

=== Second phase ===
Eight years pass. Paco is still in Maranhão with Ulisses, preparing to return home. Preta is the mother of Raí, naughty boy with a good heart, and she wants to prove that the boy is the son of Paco.

Bárbara has a troubled son, Octávio, and is married to Tony, an unscrupulous and calculating employee of Alfonso. They will do anything to ensure that Preta does not prove that Raí is the son of Paco.

Now, Paco, pretending to be Apollo, and Ulisses are back, and the lives of all will change with the return of Apollo, who was not dead, only suffering from amnesia.

== Cast ==
Actor	Character
Taís Araújo	Preta de Souza
Reynaldo Gianecchini	Paco Lambertini
Reynaldo Gianecchini	Apolo Sardinha
Giovanna Antonelli	Bárbara Campos Sodré
Lima Duarte	Alfonso Lambertini
Rosi Campos	Edilásia Sardinha
Guilherme Weber	Tony Peixoto de Almeida
Aracy Balabanian	Germana Cordiolli Lambertini
Tuca Andrada	Kaíke Oliveira
Sérgio Malheiros	Raí de Souza Lambertini
Felipe Latgé	Octávio Lambertini
Leonardo Brício	Ulisses Sardinha
Cauã Reymond	Thor Sardinha
Pedro Neschling	Dionísio Sardinha
Caio Blat	Abelardo Sardinha
Karina Bacchi	Tina
Francisco Cuoco	Pai Gaudêncio
Matheus Nachtergaele	Pai Helinho
Arlindo Lopes	Cezinha
Vanessa Gerbelli	Tancinha / Zuleide
Cláudia Ohana	Zuleide
Alinne Moraes	Moa Nascimento Mattar
Thiago Martins	Sal
Giordanna Forte	Kika
Maitê Proença	Vera Campos Sodré (Verinha)
Ney Latorraca	Eduardo Campos Sodré (Edu)
Graziela Moretto	Beki
Jonathan Haagensen	Dodô
Samara Felippo	Greta Bazaróv
Fernanda Paes Leme	Nieta Bazaróv
Tarciana Saad	Natasha Bazaróv
Sidney Magal	Comandante Frazão
Liliana Castro	Olívia Garcia
Carolina Dieckmann	Júlia Miranda
Solange Couto	Lita Nazaré de Souza
Rocco Pitanga	Felipe Garcia Freitas
Jorge Coutinho	Ítalo Freitas
Maria Rosa	Laura Garcia Freitas
Marilu Bueno	Stela Soares Dutra
Mônica Torres	Nívea Nogueira do Amaral
Sokram Sommar	Nico
Victor Perales	Brad
Ivone Hoffmann	Mariana
Christina Rodrigues	Presidiária

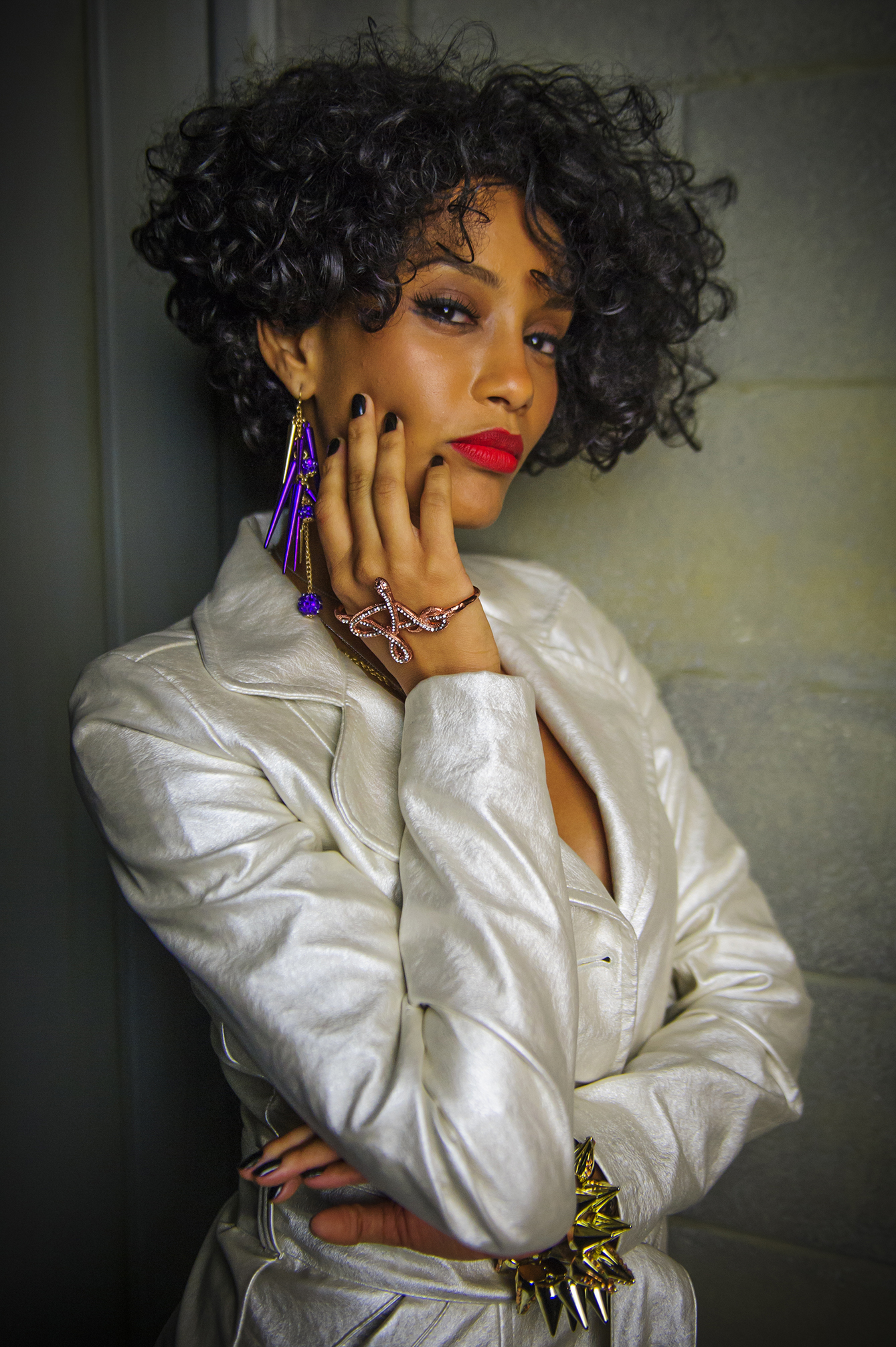
Taís Araújo
Preta

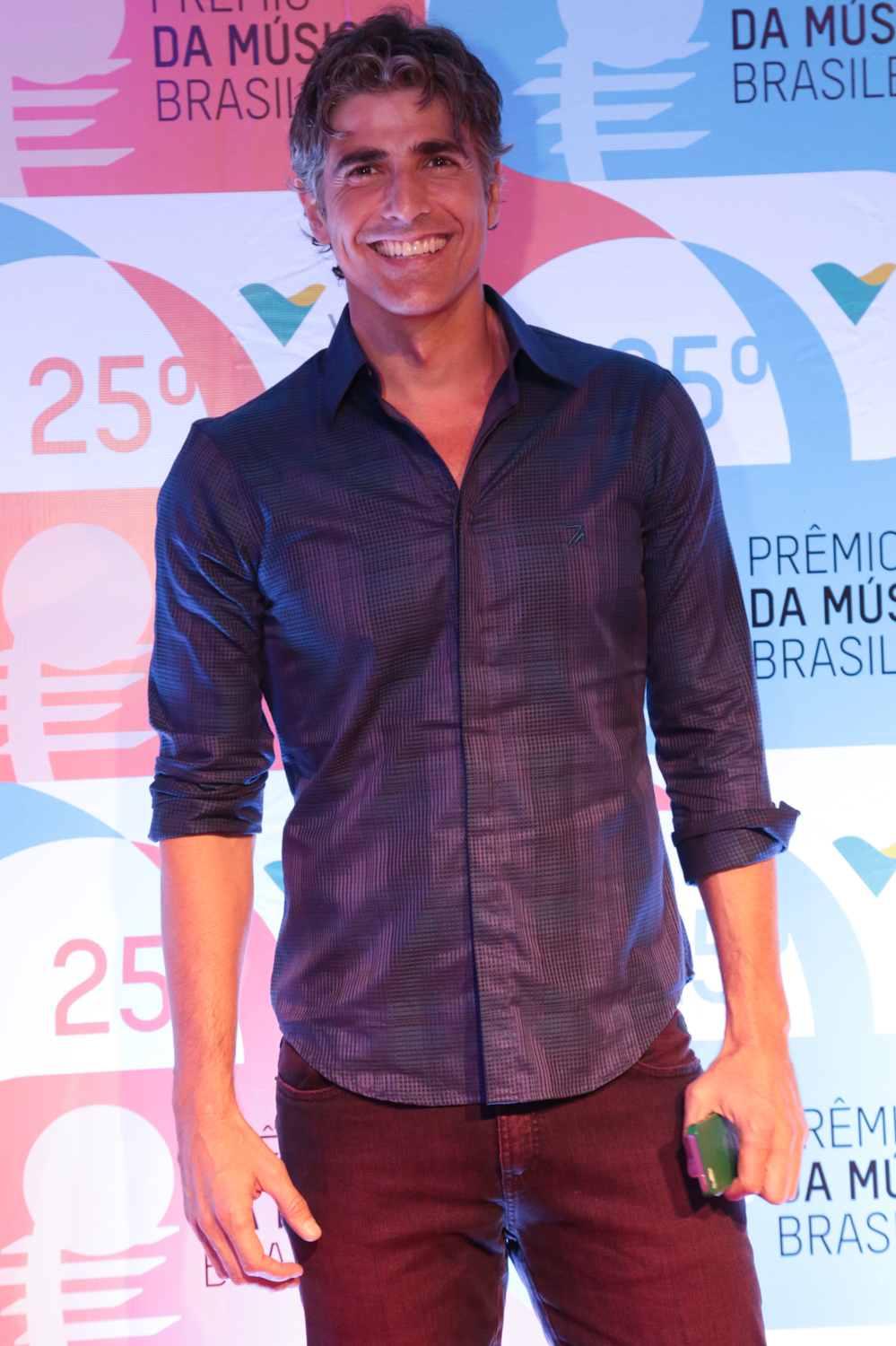
Reynaldo Gianecchini
Paco and Apolo

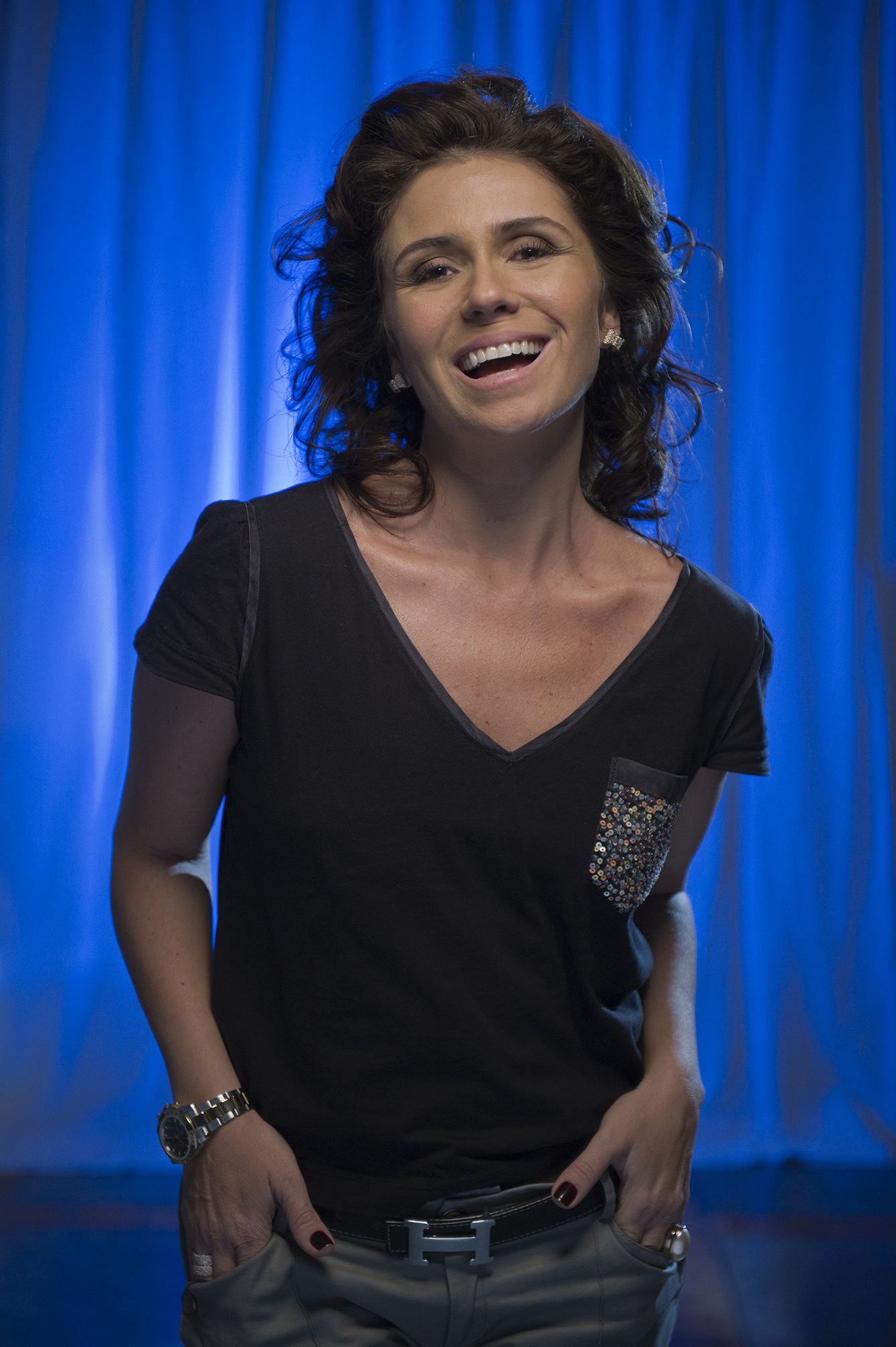
Giovanna Antonelli
Bárbara

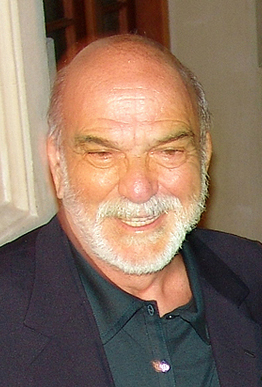
Lima Duarte
Alfonso

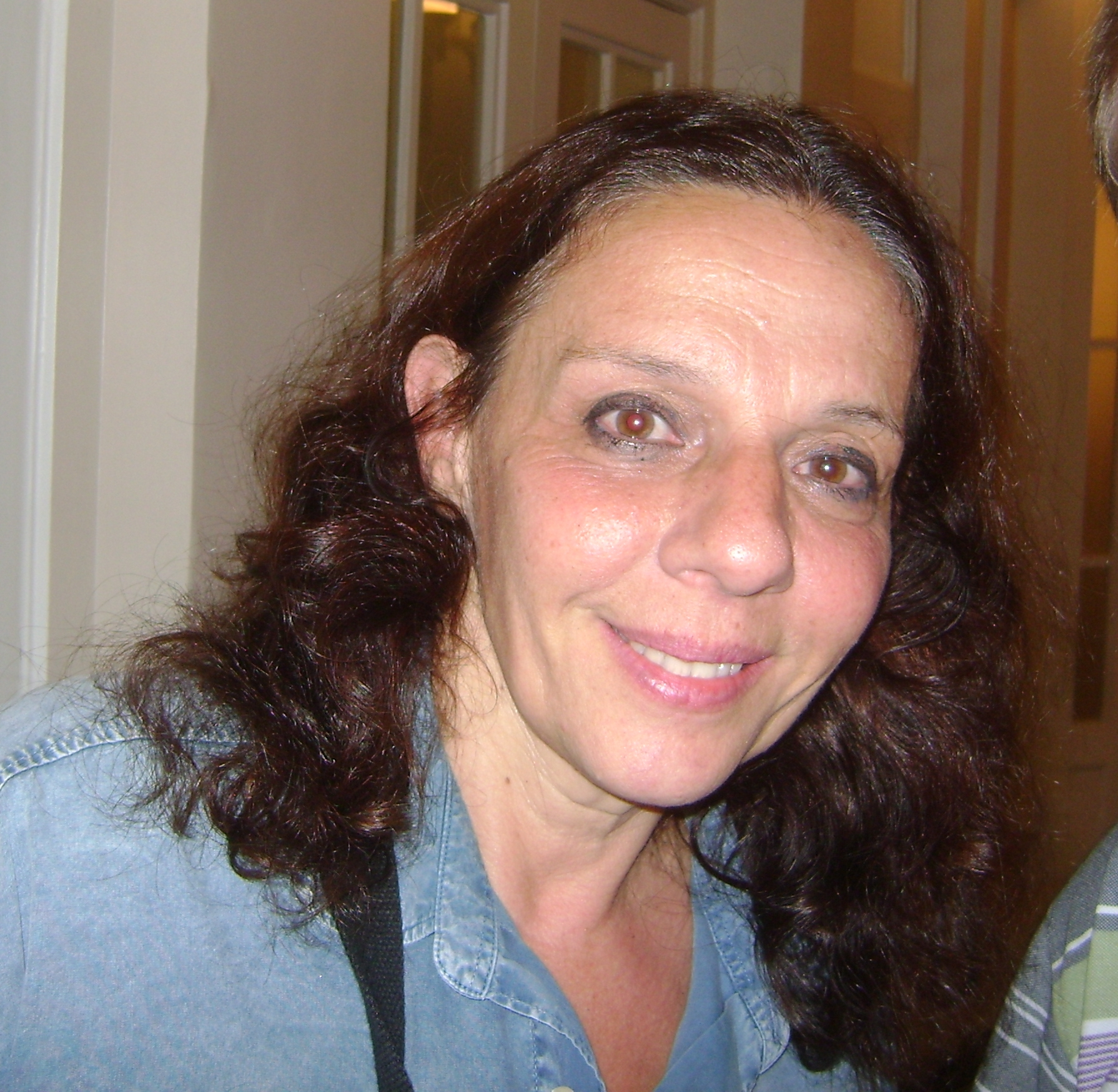
Rosi Campos
Edilásia

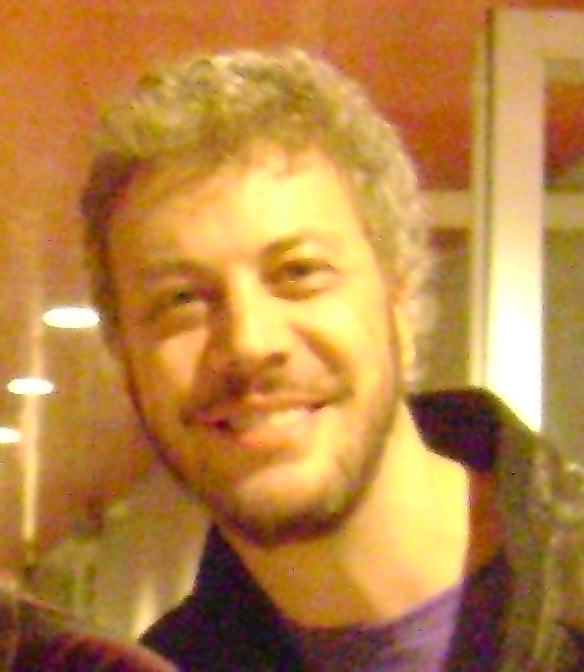
Guilherme Weber
Tony

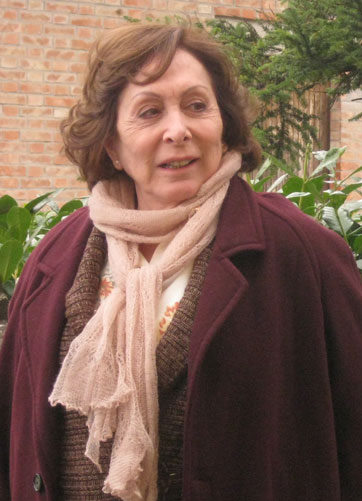
Aracy Balabanian
Germana

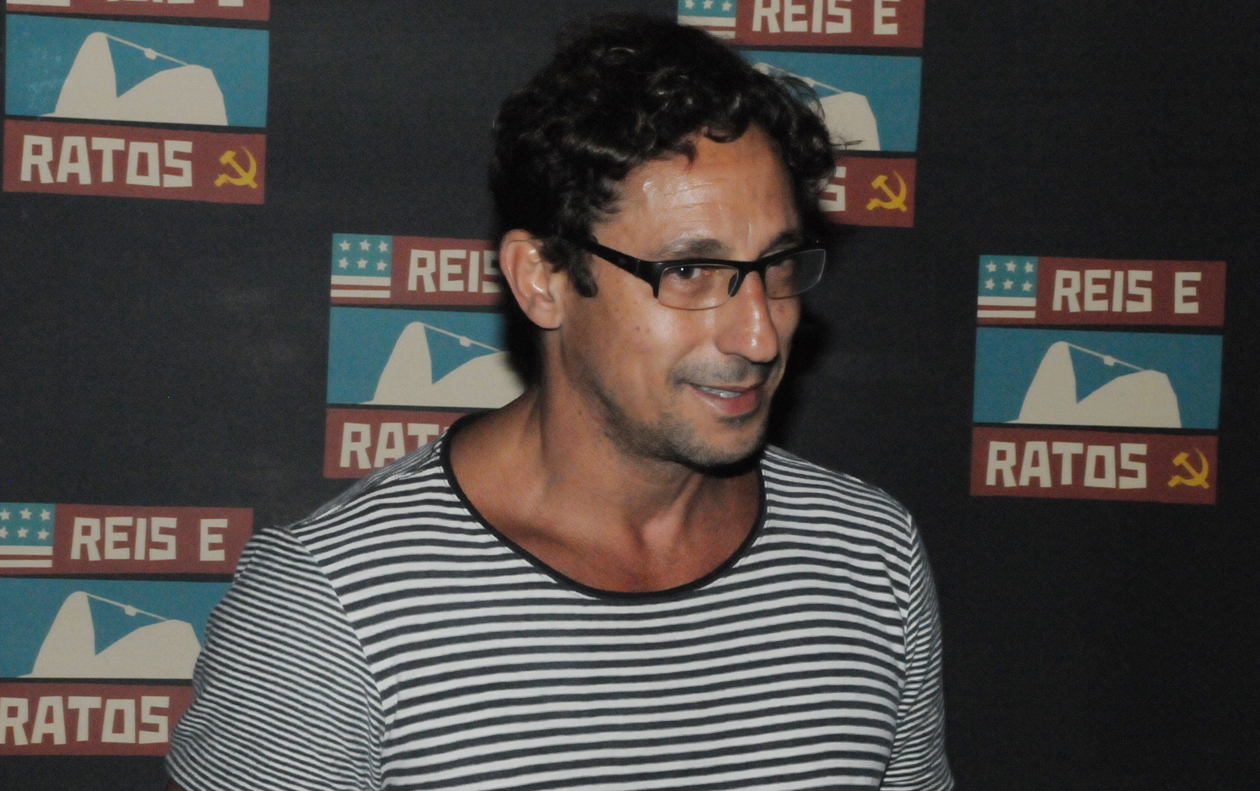
Tuca Andrada
Kaíke

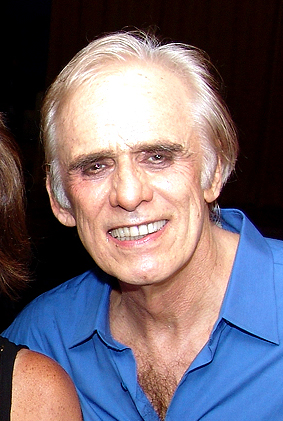
Francisco Cuoco
Pai Gaudêncio

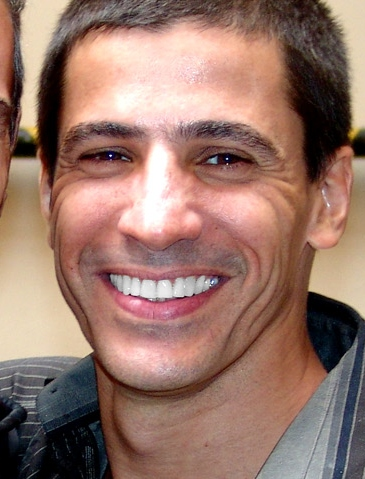
Leonardo Brício
Ulisses

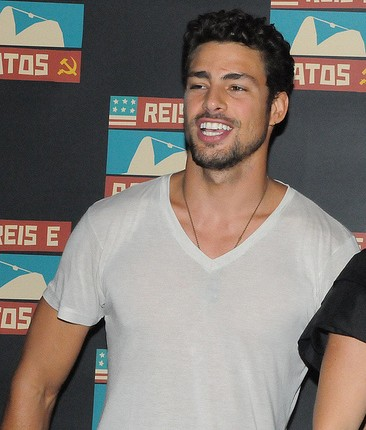
Cauã Reymond
Thor

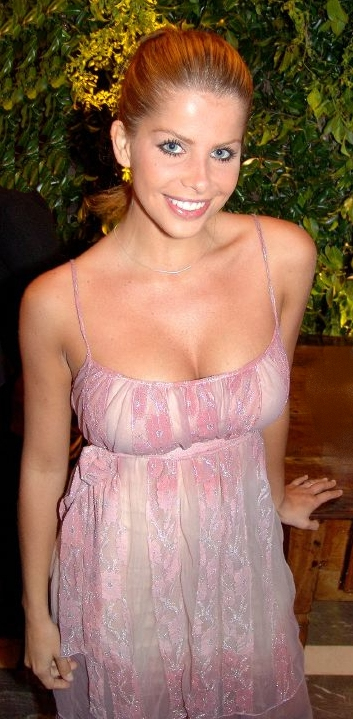
Karina Bacchi
Tina

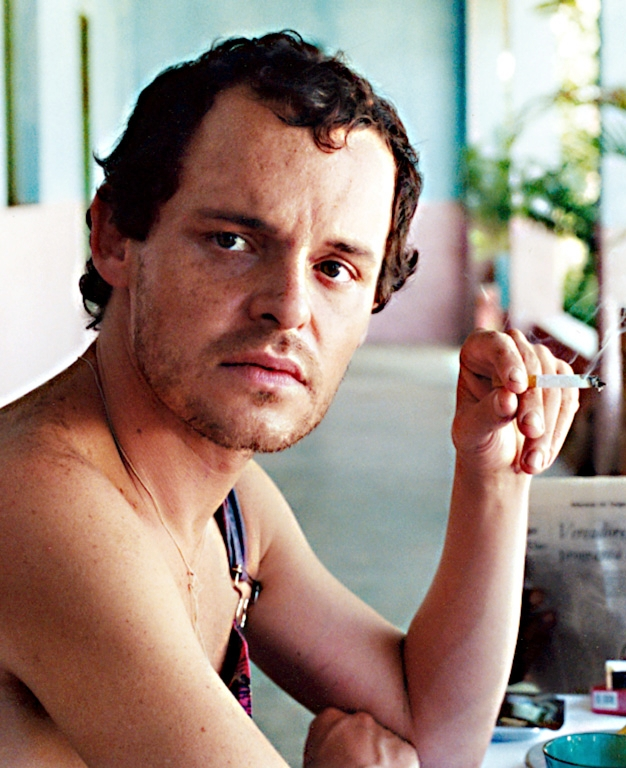
Matheus Nachtergaele
Pai Helinho

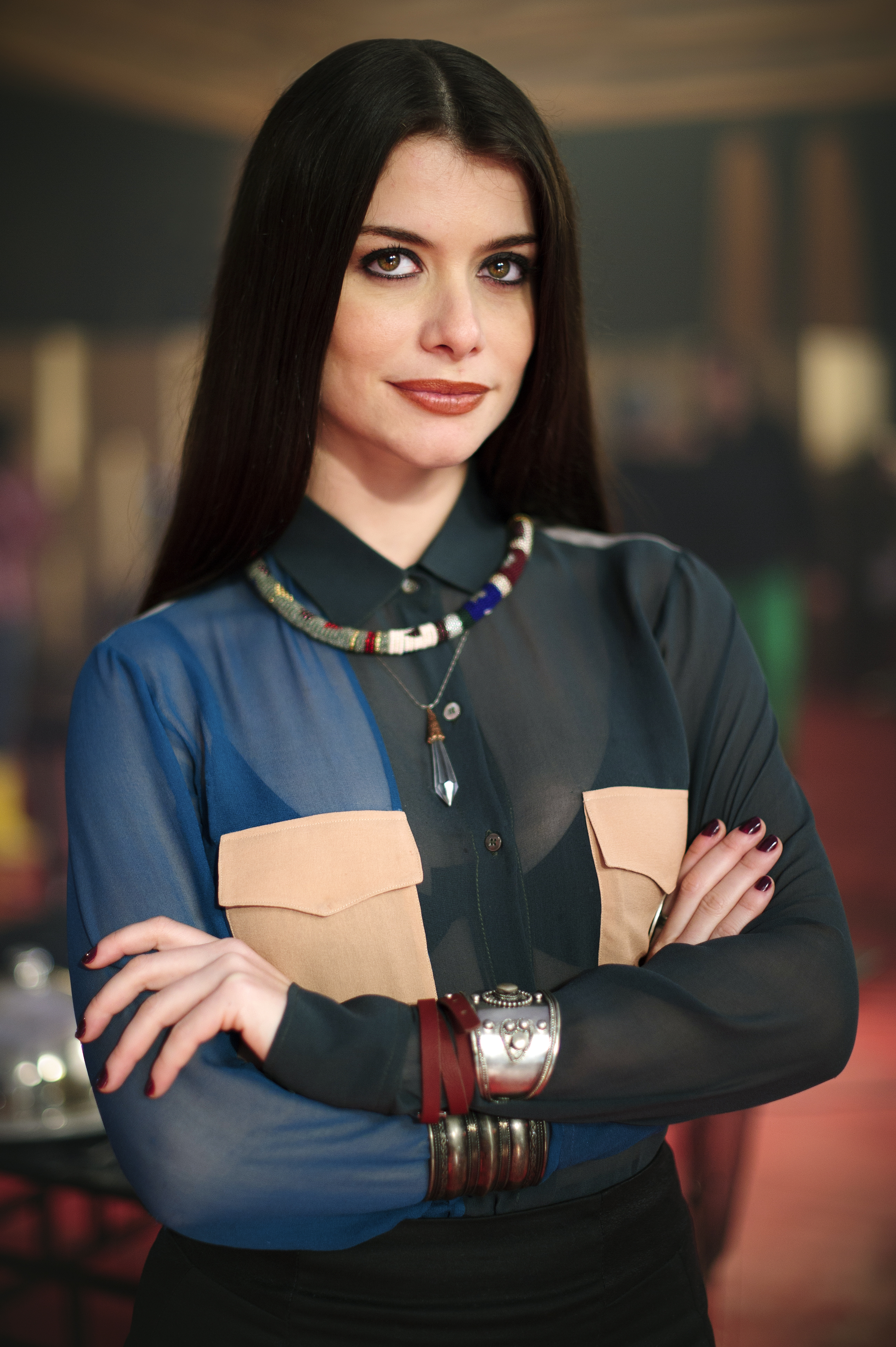
Alinne Moraes
Moa

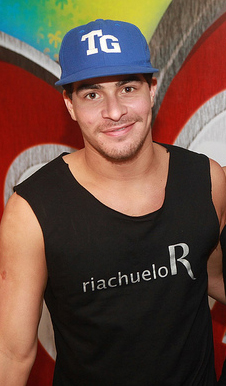
Thiago Martins
Sal

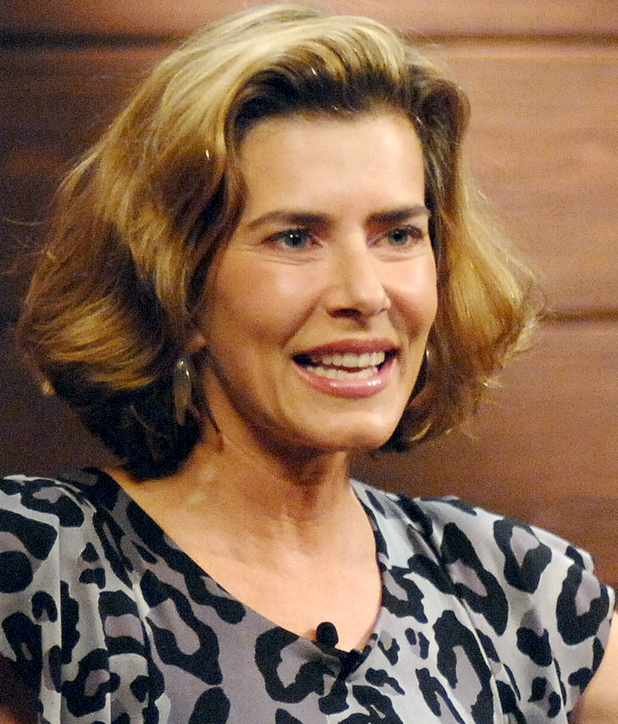
Maitê Proença
Vera

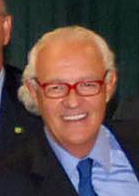
Ney Latorraca
Eduardo

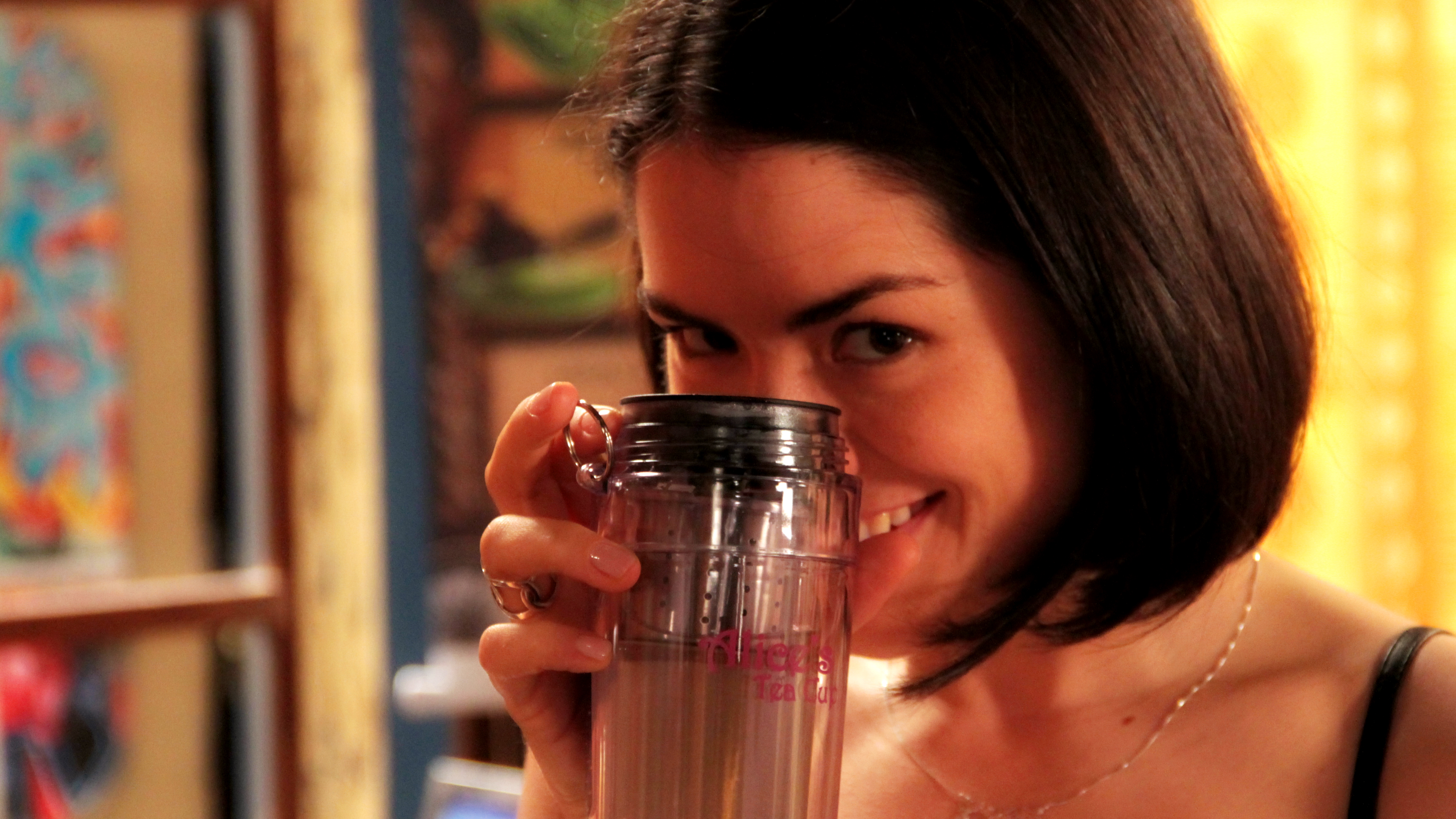
Liliana Castro
Olívia

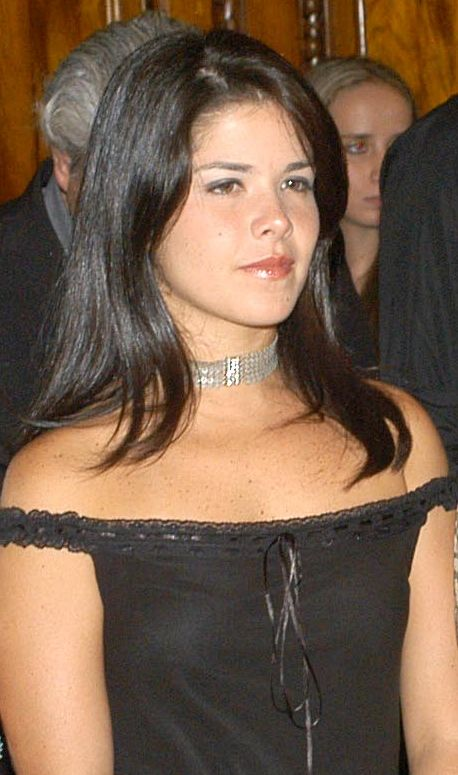
Samara Felippo
Greta

== Reception ==
=== Ratings ===
Timeslot (AMT)	# Eps.	Premiere		Finale		Rank	Season	Average viewership
Timeslot (AMT)	# Eps.	Date	Viewers (in points)	Date	Viewers (in points)	Rank	Season	Average viewership
Mondays—Fridays; 7:15 pm	185	26 January 2004	42	27 August 2004	51	#1	2004	43

In its premiere, Da Cor do Pecado recorded a viewership rating of 42 points with 61% share. In the finale, it registered viewership rating of 51 points with 69% audience share.

It averagely obtained viewership rating of 43.1 points the highest in the 21st century.
