= Bruno Garcia (actor) =

Brazilian actor (born 1970)

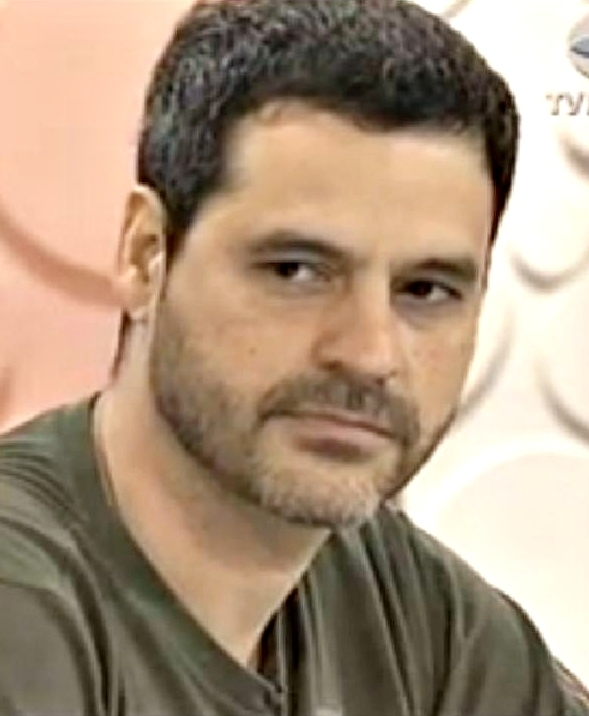
- Garcia in 2013
- Born: 29 November 1970 (age 55); Recife, Pernambuco, Brazil
- Occupation: Actor
- Years active: 1981–present
- Spouse: Marta Macedo (div. 2002)
- Children: 1

Bruno Garcia da Silva (born 29 November 1970) is a Brazilian actor.

== Filmography ==
- 2013 - Turbo (brazilian voice)
- 2012 - De Pernas pro Ar 2
- 2010 - De Pernas pro Ar
- 2006 - Saneamento Básico
- 2006 - Cleópatra
- 2005 - Sal de Prata
- 2003 - Bala na marca do Pênalti (short film)
- 2003 - Dom
- 2003 - Lisbela e o Prisioneiro
- 2001 - Ismael e Adalgisa
- 2000 - O Auto da Compadecida
- 2000 - Cronicamente Inviável
- 1999 - Castro Alves - Retrato Falado do Poeta
- 1998 - Ilusionistas Rumo ao Terceiro Milênio (also directed)

Short films

- 2001 - Oswaldo Cruz, O médico do Brasil
- 1994 - That's a Lero-Lero
- 1994 - Geraldo Voador
- 1989 - Que M... É Essa? (also directed)
- 1988 - Batom
- 1987 - Andy Warhol Está Morto

== Television work ==
Telenovelas

- 2023 - Vai na Fé
- 2013 - Sangue Bom
- 2011 - Aquele Beijo
- 2008 - Três Irmãs
- 2006 - Pé na Jaca
- 2005 - Bang Bang
- 2004 - Começar de Novo
- 2003 - Kubanacan
- 2002 - Coração de Estudante
- 1999 - Força de um Desejo
- 1991 - Felicidade

Mini-series

- 2002 - O Quinto dos Infernos
- 2001 - Os Maias
- 1999 - Luna caliente
- 1998 - Dona Flor e Seus Dois Maridos
- 1997 - A Comédia da Vida Privada

Series

- 2017 - Under Pressure (TV series)
- 2016 - Sob Pressão
- 2016 - Nada Será Como Antes
- 2010 - S.O.S. Emergência
- 2004/05 - A Diarista
- 2004 - Sob Nova Direção
- 2003 - Sexo Frágil
- 2002/04 - Os Normais
- 2001 - Brava Gente
- 1994/99 - Você Decide

== Stage work ==
- 2007 - Apareceu a Margarida (directed)
- 2004/05 - A Maldição do Vale Negro
- 2002 - Desejos, Bazófias e Quedas
- 2002 - Homem Objeto
- 2000 - Lisbela e o Prisioneiro
- 1996 - Polaroídes Explícitas
- 1996 - O Burguês Ridículo
- 1995 - A Ver Estrelas
- 1988 - Hamlet
- 1985 - Hipopocaré
