= Guilherme Weber =

Brazilian actor, director and author

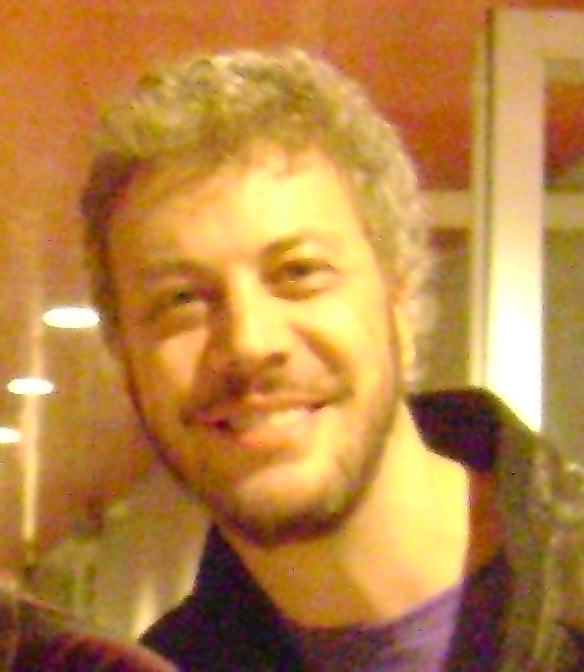
- Guilherme in São Paulo
- Born: May 6, 1972 (age 52); Curitiba, Paraná, Brazil
- Occupations: Actor; director; author
- Years active: 1993-present

Guilherme Weber (born May 6, 1972) is a Brazilian actor, director and author.

== Career ==
Guilherme began his career on theatre in 1989. He was fourteen years old when traveled with an amateur group to many cities in Brazil for four years. In 1992, he founded, with Felipe Hirsch, the theater company Sutil Companhia de Teatro. In the same year, their company received 17 awards in the category "Performances".

== Works ==
=== Television ===
- 2023 - O Limite do Universo: Além da Fronteira Infinita - Guilherme Weber
- 2022 - Cara e Coragem - Jonathan Avezedo
- 2013 - O Negócio - Ariel
- 2008 - Queridos Amigos - Benny
- 2008 - Ciranda de Pedra - Arthur X
- 2007 - Malhação - Leôncio Gurgel
- 2005 - Belíssima - Freddy Schneider
- 2005 - Carandiru, Outras Histórias - Dudu
- 2004 - Da Cor do Pecado - Tony Peixoto de Almeida
- 2002 - Os Normais - Pedro Paulo
- 2001 - Um Anjo Caiu do Céu - Carl

=== Theatre ===
- 2007 - Educação Sentimental do Vampiro (by Felipe Hirsch)
- 2003 - Alice
- 2003 - Death of a Salesman (A Morte de um Caixeiro Viajante)
- 2003 - Temporada de Gripe
- 2001 - Nostalgia
- 2000 - A Vida é Cheia de Som e Fúria

=== Filmography ===
- 2004 - Árido Movie - Jonas
- 2004 - Nina - Arthur
- 2004 - Olga - Otto Braun
- 1998 - Cruz e Sousa - O Poeta do Desterro
- 1998 – Fui Rei
