= A Grande Família =

Brazilian television sitcom (2001–2015)

- English title card
- Genre: Sitcom
- Based on: A Grande Família by Oduvaldo Vianna Filho and Armando Costa
- Developed by: Claudio Paiva; Guel Arraes
- Starring: Marco Nanini; Marieta Severo; Pedro Cardoso; Andréa Beltrão; Guta Stresser; Lúcio Mauro Filho; Marcos Oliveira; Tonico Pereira; Evandro Mesquita; Luís Miranda; Vínicius Moreno
- Opening theme: "A Grande Família"
- Composers: Dudu Nobre (2001–2013); Ivete Sangalo (2013-2014.); Zeca Pagodinho and Demônios da Garoa (2014-2015.)
- Country of origin: Brazil
- Original language: Portuguese
- No. of seasons: 14
- No. of episodes: 485

Production
- Production locations: Rio de Janeiro, Brazil
- Camera setup: Single-camera setup
- Running time: 30 minutes or more

Original release
- Network: Rede Globo
- Release: 29 March 2001 – 26 March 2015

A Grande Família (English: The Big Family) is a Brazilian television sitcom created by Oduvaldo Vianna Filho and Armando Costa that originally aired on Rede Globo from 29 March 2001 to 26 March 2015. The show tells the story of a typical middle-class family living in a suburban neighborhood of Rio de Janeiro. It is a remake of the series of the same name that aired in Brazil in the 1970s.

The family consists of a working father, Lineu, a housewife and mother, Nenê, their son Tuco, their daughter Bebel, and Bebel's fiancée, Agostinho, a taxi driver portrayed as the typical carioca malandro. The family's grandfather, Floriano, was written out of the story after the death of actor Rogério Cardoso.

In addition to being the longest-running Brazilian sitcom, A Grande Família is considered one of the most popular comedy shows in Brazil.

A film based on the series was released in theaters on 10 January 2007.

== Plot ==
Lineu (Marco Nanini), the head of the family and quintessential patriarch, acts like a father to everyone in the house, including to his street-wise son-in-law, the hilarious Agostinho (Pedro Cardoso). Lineu is as methodical and strait-laced as Agostinho is roguish and full of mischief. Lineu is married to the sweet Nené (Marieta Severo), and unlike most long-married couples, they are still passionately in love.

Bebel (Guta Stresser) is their dreamer daughter whose head is constantly in the clouds. And, of course, she could only be married to Agostinho. This family couldn't be complete without the eternal teenager Tuco (Lúcio Mauro Filho), a real mommy's boy who doesn't get any breaks from his dad.

== Cast and characters ==
Summary of character appearances
Character	Portrayed by	Appearance count	Seasons													
Character	Portrayed by	Appearance count	1	2	3	4	5	6	7	8	9	10	11	12	13	14
Lineu Silva	Marco Nanini	476	Main	Main	Main	Main	Main	Main	Main	Main	Main	Main	Main	Main	Main	Main
Nenê Silva	Marieta Severo	480	Main	Main	Main	Main	Main	Main	Main	Main	Main	Main	Main	Main	Main	Main
Bebel Silva	Guta Stresser	485 (All)	Main	Main	Main	Main	Main	Main	Main	Main	Main	Main	Main	Main	Main	Main
Tuco Silva	Lúcio Mauro Filho	485 (All)	Main	Main	Main	Main	Main	Main	Main	Main	Main	Main	Main	Main	Main	Main
Agostinho Carrara (Tinho)	Pedro Cardoso	485 (All)	Main	Main	Main	Main	Main	Main	Main	Main	Main	Main	Main	Main	Main	Main
Beiçola	Marcos Oliveira	310	Main	Main	Main	Main	Main	Main	Main	Main	Main	Main	Main	Main	Main	Main
Seu Flor	Rogério Cardoso	92	Main	Main	Main	—N/a	—N/a	—N/a	—N/a	—N/a	—N/a	—N/a	—N/a	—N/a	—N/a	—N/a
Mendonça	Tonico Pereira	133	Guest	Main	Main	Main	Main	Main	Main	Main	Main	Main	Main	Main	Main	Main
Marilda	Andréa Beltrão	207	—N/a	Main	Main	Main	Main	Main	Main	Main	Main	—N/a	—N/a	—N/a	—N/a	Guest
Paulão	Evandro Mesquita	185	—N/a	—N/a	—N/a	—N/a	Main	Main	Main	Main	Main	Main	Main	Main	Main	Main
Gina	Natália Lage	386	—N/a	—N/a	—N/a	—N/a	—N/a	Main	Main	Main	Main	Main	Main	—N/a	—N/a	—N/a
Florianinho	Vinícius Moreno	56	—N/a	—N/a	—N/a	—N/a	—N/a	—N/a	Several children	Several children	Several children	Several children	Several children	Main	Main	Main

== Episodes ==
Season	Episodes	Originally aired		DVD and Blu-ray year release		
Season	Episodes	Season premiere	Season finale	Region 1	Region 2	Region 4
1	36	29 March 2001	28 March 2002	2002		
2	37	4 April 2002	3 April 2003	2003		
3	37	10 April 2003	8 April 2004	2009		
4	30	15 April 2004	31 March 2005	2009		
5	36	7 April 2005	30 March 2006	2009		
6	37	6 April 2006	5 April 2007	2009		
7	37	12 April 2007	27 March 2008	—N/a	—N/a	—N/a
8	38	3 April 2008	9 April 2009	—N/a	—N/a	—N/a
9	36	16 April 2009	1 April 2010	—N/a	—N/a	—N/a
10	36	8 April 2010	31 March 2011	2010		
11	38	7 April 2011	29 March 2012	—N/a	—N/a	—N/a
12	38	5 April 2012	28 March 2013	—N/a	—N/a	—N/a
13	26	4 April 2013	27 March 2014	—N/a	—N/a	—N/a
14	23	10 April 2014	26 March 2015	—N/a	—N/a	—N/a

== Reception ==
=== Awards and nominations ===
A Grande Familia has received awards, including seven Extra Awards, three Arte e Qualidade awards, one APCA award, and a nomination for an International Emmy Award for actor Pedro Cardoso.
