= Marco Nanini =

Brazilian actor (born 1948)

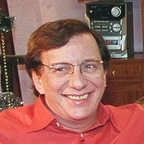
- Nanini in 2001
- Born: Marco Antônio Barroso Nanini; 31 May 1948 (age 77); Recife, Pernambuco, Brazil
- Occupation: Actor
- Years active: 1973–present

Marco Antônio Barroso Nanini (born 31 May 1948) is a Brazilian actor. Most of his activities have been in comedy.

Nanini achieved national sensation through his participation in the theatre piece "O Mistério de Irma Vap", together with fellow actor and friend Ney Latorraca. It was one of the biggest box office successes in Brazil, staying for 11 consecutive years with the same casting (a Guinness World Record). It was also filmed under the direction of Carla Camurati, premiering in 2006.

== Personal life ==
In 2011, Nanini spoke at the first time about his sexuality to a Brazilian magazine, addressing questions on the subject: "Oh, it's going well, sometimes a young man appears, sometimes not, but I'm okay." declared the actor, who lives with producer, Fernando Libonati in Rio de Janeiro, Brazil.

== Filmography ==
=== Film ===
Year	Title	Role	Notes
1973	As Moças Daquela Hora	Luizinho	
1975	O Roubo das Calcinhas	Alfredo	
1978	A Noite dos Duros	Bartolomeu "Bartô"	
1980	Teu Tua	Man	Segment: "Um Marido Debaixo da Cama"
1987	Night Angels	Guto	
1987	Feliz Ano Velho	Beto	
1995	Carlota Joaquina, Princess of Brazil	D. João VI	
1998	Love and Co	Alves	
2000	A Dog's Will	Severino de Aracaju "Capitão"	
2001	Caramuru - A Invenção do Brasil	Narrator	
2001	Copacabana	Alberto	
2001	A Samba for Sherlock	Mello Pimenta	
2003	Lisbela e o Prisioneiro	Frederico Evandro	
2003	Brother Bear	Tucke (voice)	Brazilian Dubbing
2004	Apolônio Brasil, Campeão da Alegria	Apolônio Brasil	
2006	Irma Vap - O Retorno	Tony Albuquerque / Cleide Albuquerque	
2007	A Grande Família - O Filme	Lineu Silva	
2008	Romance	Rodolfo	
2009	A Suprema Felicidade	Grandpa Noel	
2010	O Bem-Amado	Odorico Paraguaçu	
2019	Greta	Pedro	
2021	Mise en Scène: a Artesania do Artista	Himself	Documentary

Television

Year	Title	Role	Notes
1969	A Ponte dos Suspiros	Soldier	Cameo
1971	O Cafona	Júlio Cezar "Julinho"	
1972–79	Caso Especial	Various characters	
1972	A Patota	Teacher Adolfo Simões "Simões"	
1972	O Primeiro Amor	Rui Lima	
1973	Carinhoso	Faísca	
1975	Pecado Capital	Vinícius Lisboa	
1975	A Moreninha	Felipe	
1975	Gabriela	Teacher Josué Xavier	
1976–82	Planeta dos Homens	Various characters	
1976	O Feijão e o Sonho	Officer Marcondes	
1977	Sítio do Picapau Amarelo	Guard Anselmo	Episode: "O Picapau Amarelo"
1977	Um Sol Maior	Lauro	
1979	Feijão Maravilha	Jorge Afonso "Jorginho"	
1979	O Todo Poderoso	Caio	
1979	Telecurso 2º Grau	Various characters	
1980	As Três Marias	Aluísio	
1982	Elas por Elas	Doctor Décio Carvalho	
1984	Plunct, Plact, Zuuum... 2	Stepfather of Fabiano	
1985	Joana	Cláudio Gonzaga "Cacau"	
1985	Um Sonho a Mais	Jurandir de Souza "Mosca" / Florisbela Freire	
1986	Tele Tema	–	Episode: "A Luneta Mágica"
1987	Brega & Chique	Alberico Montenegro "Montenegro"	
1988–90	TV Pirata	Various characters	
1991	Escolinha do Professor Raimundo: 25 Anos de Trapalhões	Rolando Lero	Episode: "July 27th"
1992	Pedra sobre Pedra	Ivonaldo Pontes	
1993	O Mapa da Mina	Doctor Mauro	Special appearance
1993	Caso Especial	Teacher	Episode: "O Besouro e a Rosa"
1994	Caso Especial	Frederico Evandro	Episode: "Lisbela e o Prisioneiro"
1993–94	Terça Nobre	Various characters	
1994	Brasil Especial	Various characters	
1995	Terça Nobre	Colonel Ponciano de Azevedo	Episode: "O Coronel e o Lobisomem"
1995–97	A Comédia da Vida Privada	Various characters	
1998	Dona Flor e Seus Dois Maridos	Doctor Teodoro Madureira	
1999	O Auto da Compadecida	Severino de Aracaju "Capitão"	
1999	Andando nas Nuvens	Otávio Montana	
2000	A Invenção do Brasil	Narrator	
2000	Brava Gente	Euricão	Episode: "O Santo e a Porca"
2001–14	A Grande Família	Lineu Silva	
2004	Sitcom.br	Luis Fernando Veríssimo	Episode: "Versões"
2016	Êta Mundo Bom!	Teacher Pancrácio Martinho	
2016	Êta Mundo Bom!	Doctor Pandolfo Martinho	
2017–19	O Álbum da Grande Família	Narrator	
2018	Deus Salve o Rei	Augusto de Lurton, King of Artena	
2019	A Dona do Pedaço	Eusébio Macondo	
2019	A Dona do Pedaço	Eustáquio Macondo Júnior "Júnior"	Episodes: "June 21–August 7"
2022	Sob Pressão	Heleno Domingos Moreira	Season 5
2023	João sem Deus - A Queda de Abadiânia	João de Deus	

== Theater ==
Year	Title	Role
1965	A Floresta Encantada	
1965	O Bruxo e A Rainha	
1966–68	Escola de Teatro	
1968	Ralé	
1968	Salome	
1968	Stanislaw Ponte Preta e o Sexo Zangado	
1969	A Gatatarada	
1969	O Show do Crioulo Doido	
1970	Esse Banheiro é Pequeno Demais Para Nós Dois	
1970–71	A Vida Escrachada de Joana Martini e Baby Stompanato	Boy
1971	A Pequena Notável	
1972	O Cordão Umbilical	
1973	O Encontro no Bar	
1973–75	As Desgraças de uma Criança	Pacific
1974	Pippin	Pippin
1975	Pano de Boca	Pagan
1976–77	Deus lhe Pague	Cockroach
1976–77	Um Padre à Italiana	Gino
1977	Os Filhos de Kennedy	
1978	Camas Redondas, Casais Quadrados	
1978	Zoo Story	
1979	Tiro ao Alvo	
1980–81	Brasil: da Censura à Aberta	
1980–84	Doce Deleite	
1984	Mão na Luva	He
1985–86	O Corsário do Rei	
1986	A Bandeira dos Cinco Mil Réis	
1986	The Mystery of Irma Vep	
1995	Kean	Edmund Kean
1996–98	Le Bourgeois gentilhomme	Mr. Jourdain
1998–00	Uma Noite na Lua	Playwright
2001	Who's Afraid of Virginia Woolf?	George
2002	Os Solitários	Todd, Arthur, Bishop and Emma
2003	Death of a Salesman	Willy Loman
2005	Um Circo de Rins e Fígados	
2007–08	O Bem Amado	Odorico Paraguaçu
2010–11	Pterodatilos	Arthur
2012–13	A Arte e a Maneira de Abordar seu chefe para pedir um aumento	Speaker
2014–15	Beije Minha Lápide	Bala
2017	Ubu Rei	Father Ubu

== Technical part ==
Year	Title	Function
1965	A Floresta Encantada	Author
1973	Descasque o Abacaxi Antes da Sobremesa	Author
1979	Tiro ao Alvo	Producer
1980–84	Doce Deleite	Producer
1984	Mão na Luva	Producer
1986	A Bandeira dos Cinco Mil Réis	Producer
1986–95	The Mystery of Irma Vep	Producer
1990–92	Fulaninha e Dona Coisa	Director
1991	Hello Gershwin	Director
1991–93	Fulaninha e Dona Coisa	Producer
1992	De Rosto Colado	Director
1994	Strange Case of Dr Jekyll and Mr Hyde	Director
1994	Strange Case of Dr Jekyll and Mr Hyde	Producer
1995	Kean	Producer
1995	As Regras do Jogo	Director
1996	E Continua Tudo Bem	Director
1996–98	Le Bourgeois gentilhomme	Producer
1998–00	Uma Noite na Lua	Producer
2000–01	Who's Afraid of Virginia Woolf?	Producer
2002	Os Solitários	Producer
2003	Death of a Salesman	Producer
2003	Nada de Pânico	Producer
2005	Um Circo de Rins e Fígados	Producer
2006	Irma Vap - O Retorno	Producer
2007	O Bem Amado	Producer
2008	Cine Teatro Limite	Producer
2009	From Beginning to End	Producer
2010–11	Pterodáctilos	Producer

== Awards ==
- Indication for best actor to the Grande Prêmio Cinema Brasil, for his acting in Amor & Cia.
- Best Actor Award at the Festival de Cinema Brasileiro de Miami.
