= Pecado Rasgado =

- Genre: Telenovela
- Created by: Silvio de Abreu
- Directed by: Régis Cardoso; Dennis Carvalho
- Country of origin: Brazil
- Original language: Portuguese
- No. of episodes: 167

Production
- Running time: 40 minutes

Original release
- Network: TV Globo
- Release: 4 September 1978 – 16 March 1979

Related
- Te Contei?; Feijão Maravilha

Pecado Rasgado (English: Ripped Sin) is a Brazilian telenovela produced and broadcast by TV Globo. It premiered on 4 September 1978 and ended on 16 March 1979, with a total of 167 episodes. It's the twenty second "novela das sete" to be aired at the timeslot. It is created by Silvio de Abreu and directed by Régis Cardoso.

== Cast ==
Actor	Character
Aracy Balabanian	Teca
Juca de Oliveira	Renato
Renée de Vielmond	Estela
Armando Bógus	Nélio
Nádia Lippi	Cristina (Cris)
Ney Santanna	Rodrigo
Eloísa Mafalda	Zoraide
Rogério Fróes	Maurício
Renata Fronzi	Raquel
Neuza Amaral	Eunice
Cláudio Cavalcanti	Bruno
Lady Francisco	Helena
Moacyr Deriquém	Arthur
Lúcia Alves	Elizabete (Betinha)
Edwin Luisi	Sérgio
Kátia D'Angelo	Beatriz
João Carlos Barroso	Geraldo
Alcione Mazzeo	Vera
Carlos Gregório	Taio
Ida Gomes	Aída
Oswaldo Louzada	Seu Bilu
Yara Cortes	Alice
Felipe Carone	Mariano
Myrian Rios	Patrícia
Élida L'Astorina	Ana (Aninha)
Roberto Bonfim	Augusto
Lúcia Mello	Gisélia
Juan Daniel	Seu Miguel
Gilda Sarmento	Olímpia
Tony Ferreira	Júlio
Julciléa Telles	Heloísa
Agnes Fontoura	Tita
