= Eloísa Mafalda =

Brazilian actress (1924–2018)

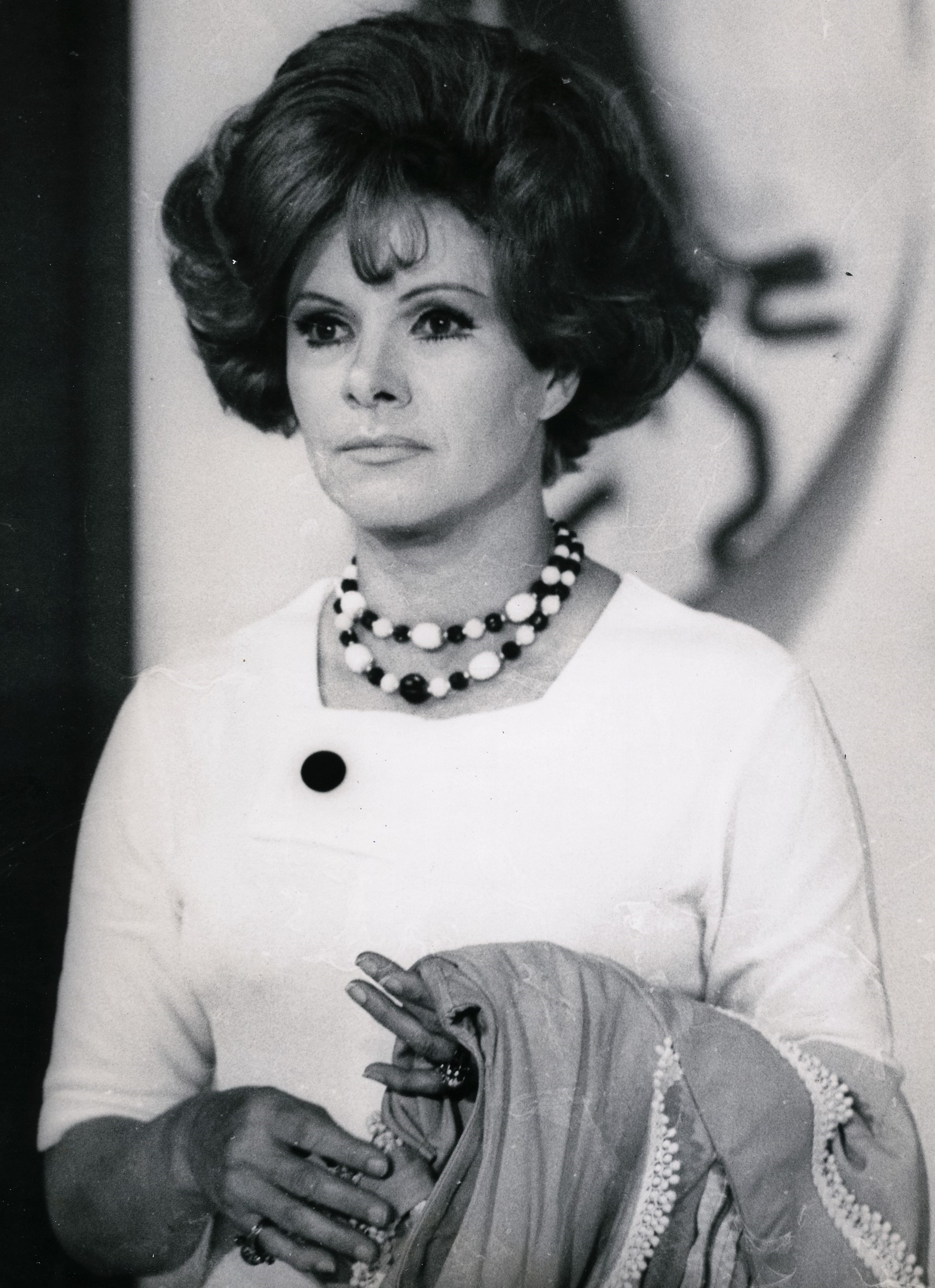
- Mafalda in 1970
- Born: Mafalda Theotto; September 18, 1924; Jundiaí, São Paulo, Brazil
- Died: May 16, 2018 (aged 93); Petrópolis, Rio de Janeiro, Brazil
- Occupation: Actress

Mafalda Theotto (September 18, 1924 – May 16, 2018), known professionally as Eloísa Mafalda, was a Brazilian actress.

== Filmography ==
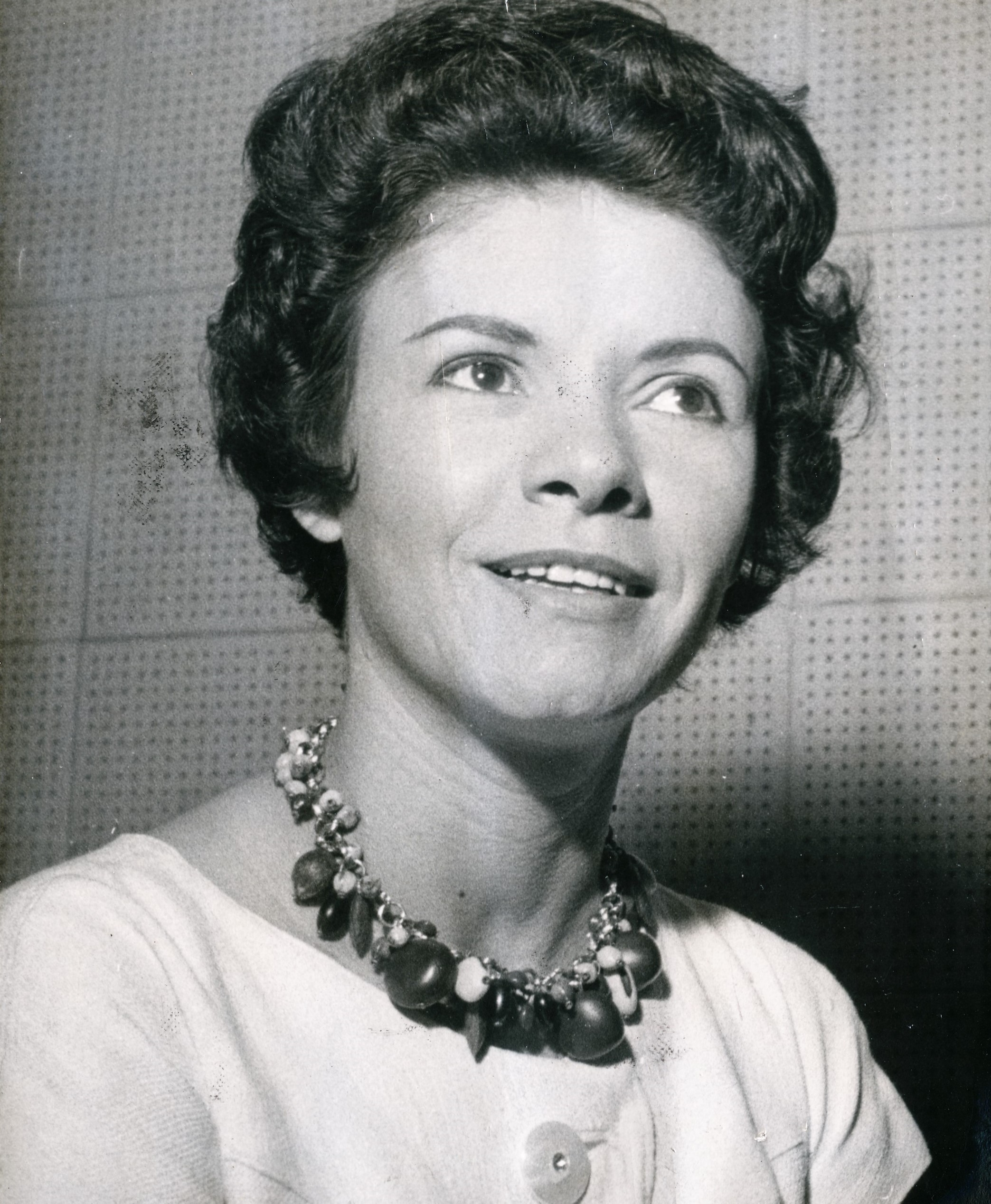
Mafalda in 1960

=== Television ===
Year	Title	Role
1965	O Ébrio	Heloísa
1968	A Grande Mentira	Dona Elvira
1969	A Cabana do Pai Tomás	Emily
1970	Pigmalião 70	Ester
1970	A Próxima Atração	Dinorá
1971	Caso Especial	Episode: Nº1
1971	Bandeira 2	Zulmira
1971	O Cafona	Margarida
1972	Caso Especial, Meu Primeiro Baile	Elza
1972	O Bofe	Gonzaguinha
1972	A Grande Família	Irene Silva "Dona Nenê"
1975	Gabriela	Maria Machadão
1975	O Grito	Socorro
1976	Saramandaia	Maria Aparadeira Moreira
1977	Locomotivas	Joana
1977	O Astro	Dona Consolação
1978	Pecado Rasgado	Zoraide
1980	Água Viva	Irene Fragoso Neves
1980	Plumas e Paetês	Zeni
1981	Brilhante	Edite Pereira
1982	Paraíso	Dona Mariana Gomes
1982	Caso Verdade	Episode: O Menino do Olho Azul
1983	Caso Verdade	Episode: O Bloco do Boicote Está na Rua
1983	Champagne	Adélia
1984	Corpo a Corpo	Guiomar Motta
1985	O Tempo e o Vento	Arminda Terra
1985	Roque Santeiro	Dona Ambrosina Abelha "Dona Pombinha"
1986	Hipertensão	Gioconda
1987	Expresso Brasil	Maria Machadão / Dona Ambrosina Abelha "Dona Pombinha"
1988	Vida Nova	Jandira
1989	O Sexo dos Anjos	Francisquinha Barata
1990	A, E, I, O... Urca	Dona Damásia
1990	Delegacia de Mulheres	Celeste
1990	Araponga	Zuleide
1992	Pedra Sobre Pedra	Gioconda Pontes
1993	Mulheres de Areia	Manuela
1994	A Madona de Cedro	Efigênia
1994	Você Decide	Episode: A última chance (Yolanda)
1995	Você Decide	Episode: Veneno Ambiente
1996	Você Decide	Episode: Sangue no Araguaia
1996	A Vida como Ela É...	Episode: O Único Beijo
1996	Quem É Você?	Kitty
1997	Por Amor	Leonor Batalha
1998	Meu Bem Querer	Dona Delfina
1998	Hilda Furacão	Clotilde
1998	Labirinto	Sarita
1999	Você Decide	Episode: Madame Sussu
1999	Você Decide	Episode: Robin Hood Aposentado
1999	Você Decide	Episode: O Terceiro Homem
2000	Aquarela do Brasil	Margarida
2001	Brava Gente	Dona Inxirida - Arioswaldo e o Casamento de sua Velha Mãe Centenária
2001	Brava Gente	Dona Inxirida - O Natal de Arioswaldo
2001	Porto dos Milagres	Celeste Marimbás
2001	O Clone	Dona Neuza, Jade's neighbor
2002	Brava Gente	Dona Clara – O Enterro da Cafetina
2002	O Beijo do Vampiro	Dona Carmem

=== Film ===
Year	Title	Role
1950	Somos Dois	Secretary
1973	Os Mansos	Armando's mother
1974	O Mau-Caráter	Constança
1976	O Ibraim do Subúrbio	Dinorah
1990	Beijo 2348/72	Guest house owner
1998	Simão, o Fantasma Trapalhão	Lucélia

== Stage ==
Year	Title
1965	O Morro dos Ventos Uivantes
1974	O Ministro e a Vedete
1978	Lá em Casa, é Tudo Doido
