= The Brave Warrior =

1968 film directed by Gustavo Dahl

- Directed by: Gustavo Dahl
- Written by: Roberto Marinho de Azevedo Neto; Gustavo Dahl
- Produced by: Gustavo Dahl; José Kantor
- Starring: Paulo César Pereio; Mário Lago; Maria Lúcia Dahl; Ítalo Rossi; Milton Gonçalves
- Cinematography: Affonso Beato
- Edited by: Eduardo Escorel
- Music by: Remo Usai
- Production companies: Joe Kantor Produções Cinematográficas; Gustavo Dahl Producoes Cinematograficas; Saga Filmes
- Distributed by: Difilm
- Release date: 1968
- Running time: 80 minutes
- Country: Brazil
- Language: Portuguese

The Brave Warrior (Portuguese: O Bravo Guerreiro) is a 1968 Brazilian drama film directed by Gustavo Dahl. The directorial debut of Dahl, it is one of the most important films of the second phase of Brazil's Cinema Novo movement. It won the Special Award at the 1968 Festival de Brasília, Best Director at the 1968 Festival de Belo Horizonte, and the Best Cinematography at the 1969 Instituto Nacional do Cinema (INC) Awards.

== Cast ==
- Paulo César Pereio as Miguel Horta
- Mário Lago as Augusto
- Ítalo Rossi as Conrado Frota
- Maria Lúcia Dahl as Clara Horta
- Milton Gonçalves as sindicalist
- César Ladeira as Virgílio
- Paulo Gracindo as Péricles
- Joseph Guerreiro as Honório
- Angelito Mello as governor
- Hugo Carvana as Pelêgo
- Carlos Vereza as Rodrigues
