= A Próxima Atração =

- Genre: Telenovela
- Created by: Walther Negrão
- Directed by: Régis Cardoso
- Opening theme: "A Próxima Atração" by Ivan Lins
- Country of origin: Brazil
- Original language: Portuguese
- No. of episodes: 150

Production
- Running time: 45 minutes

Original release
- Network: TV Globo
- Release: 26 October 1970 – 17 April 1971

A Próxima Atração is a Brazilian telenovela produced and broadcast by TV Globo. It premiered on 26 October 1970 and ended on 17 April 1971, with a total of 150 episodes. It's the seventh "novela das sete" to be aired at the timeslot. It is created by Vicente Sesso and directed by Régis Cardoso.

== Cast ==
Actor	Character
Sérgio Cardoso	Rafael Borges (Rodrigo)
Tônia Carrero	Glória
Armando Bógus	Pardal
Paulo Gracindo	Sr. Borges
Célia Biar	Dulce
Renata Sorrah	Madalena
Susana Vieira	Regina
Irene Singery	Cláudia
Betty Faria	Cecília (Ciça)
Jacyra Silva	Suzete
Eloísa Mafalda	Dinorá
Edney Giovenazzi	Mário Yamashita
Silvio de Abreu	Subdelegado Damasceno Righi Salomão
Carmem Silva	Dona Saudade
Paulo Goulart	Tomás
Gracindo Júnior	Clóvis
Nélson Caruso	Alaor
Felipe Carone	Jarbas
Tânia Scher	Laura
Marcos Paulo	Téo
Jardel Mello	Aristênio
Ida Gomes	Zilda
Juan Daniel	Seu Eugênio
Norah Fontes	Dona Júlia
Rachel Martins	Dona Lourdes
Reinaldo Gonzaga	Bento (Bentinho)
Ênio Carvalho	Sílvio
Maria Cristina Nunes	Nara
