= Ida Gomes =

Brazilian actress

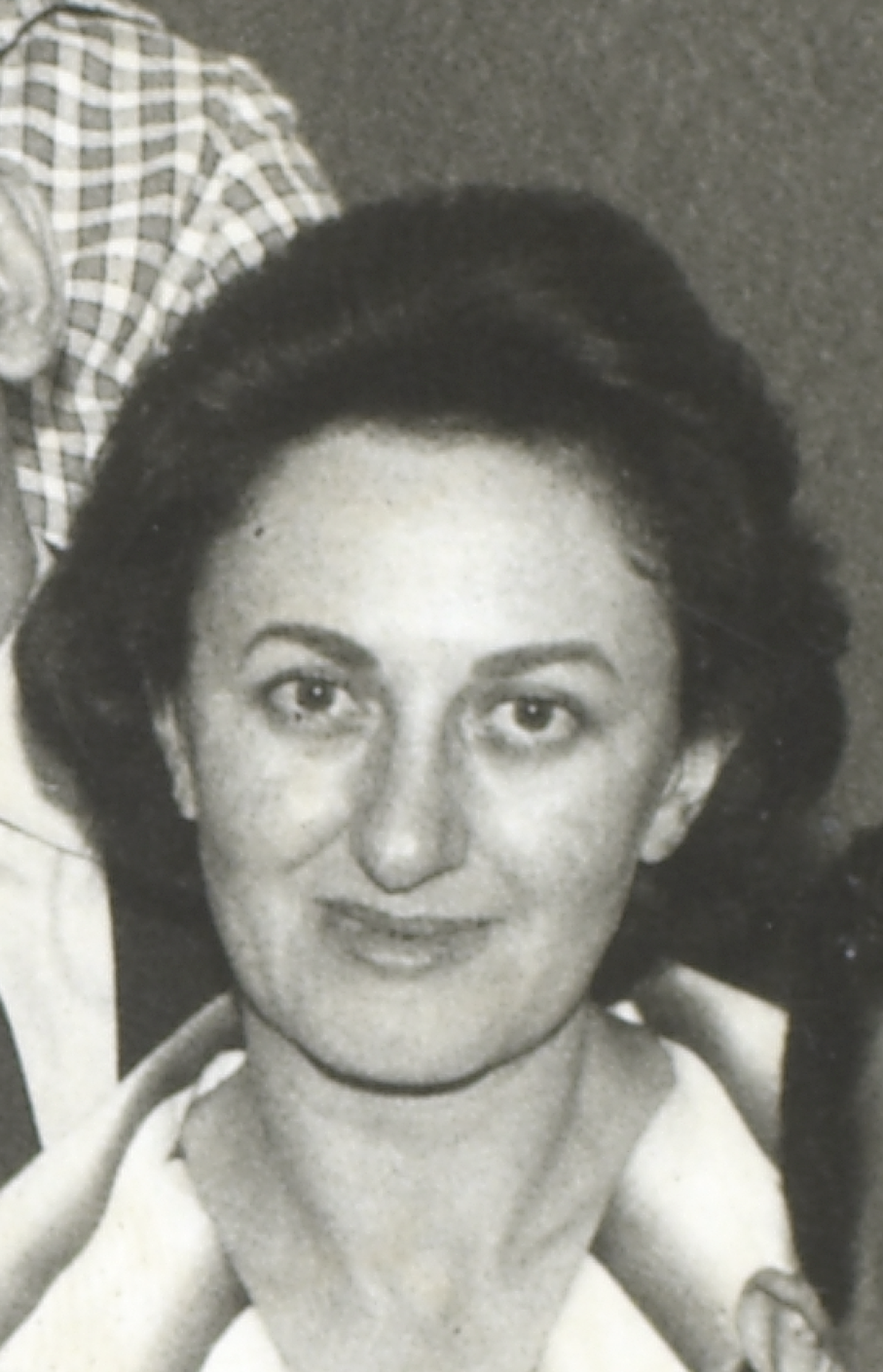
- Born: Ita Szafran; September 25, 1923; Kraśnik, Poland
- Died: February 22, 2009 (aged 85); Rio de Janeiro, Brazil
- Occupation: Actress
- Years active: 1944–2009

Ita Szafran (25 September 1923 – 22 February 2009), known professionally as Ida Gomes, was a Polish-born Brazilian actress.

== Biography ==
Gomes was born Ita Szafran to a Jewish family in Kraśnik, Poland. She spent her first 13 years in France, where her family moved in 1924. In Paris, she learned French and came into contact with 17th-century French classical dramaturgy like Racine, Corneille and Molière. Szafran emigrated to Brazil with her family in the late 1930s.

== Radio ==
In 1938, encouraged by her mother, she participated and won a talent contest by reading a poem on Celso Guimarães' program on Rádio Tupi, being offered to sign a contract to work in radio soap operas, taking up the stage name Ida Gomes. During 20 years, she worked as a radio actress, working for Rádio Tupi, and also in Rádio Globo, where he joined the cast of Amaral Gurgel, and for Rádio Nacional, which was at the height of its programming. In 1948, she received a scholarship and moved for a year to the United States and in 1951, she went on to an internship as an announcer for BBC Radio in London.

== Television ==
In 1953, she returned to Brazil and began her career in television, joining TV Tupi, where she performed at Grande Teatro Tupi, a teletheater directed by Sérgio Britto, and at Câmara Um, a series directed by Jacy Campos that staged horror stories. She also performed in the telenovelas Coração Delator (1954) and A Canção de Bernadete (1957).

Gomes moved in 1967 to TV Globo, and her first participation in the telenovelas of this network was in A Rainha Louca. She acted in several telenovelas and miniseries of the Rio TV station, playing unforgettable characters such as the elderly queen Sílvia Candiano in A Ponte dos Suspiros (1968), the unscrupulous Jandira Serrano in Verão Vermelho (1969), the amusing Mother Encarnación in Estúpido Cupido (1976), the spinster Tia Magda in O Astro (1977), the grandiose Zizi de La Rocha in Memórias de um Gigolô (1986), and others.

In 1973, she played her biggest television success: the priceless Dorotéia Cajazeira, one of the three Cajazeiras sisters (the other two sisters were played by actresses Dirce Migliaccio and Dorinha Duval), repressed spinsters, friends of the mayor of Sucupira, and who defended morality and good customs, with certain hypocrisy in O Bem-Amado, the first Brazilian telenovela in color, written by Dias Gomes and directed by Régis Cardoso; a notable feature of this telenovela was its music, composed by Vinícius de Moraes and Toquinho. The success of the telenovela was so great, that it was rebooted as a series seven years later, with Ida and the same protagonists: Paulo Gracindo, Lima Duarte, Emiliano Queiroz and Dirce Migliaccio.

Despite being Jewish, Ida was one of the actresses most known for her roles as a nun on TV. In an interview with Jô Soares on his Programa do Jô, in 2001, Ida jokingly declared when the presenter asked her a question about her multiple roles as a nun on television: "I'm Jewish, but I'm always called to play the charity sister, the Mother Superior. Globo tried to convert me but failed". Her most recent work on TV was in the first season of the miniseries JK, in which she was Sister Maria - a French nun living in Minas Gerais who helped physician Juscelino Kubitschek (played by Wagner Moura) to take care of the wounded in the military battle between the States of Minas and São Paulo.

== Voice acting ==
Parallel to her career on TV, Gomes did voiceovers and was part of the stellar cast of Cine Castro, directed by Carla Civelli, where she dubbed alongside Nathalia Timberg, Alberto Pérez, Cláudio Corrêa e Castro, Angela Bonatti, José Miziara, Daniel Filho and Cláudio Cavalcanti. She became the official voice of Bette Davis and Joan Crawford in their main movies dubbed for the Brazilian television.

== Theater ==
Gomes made her theatrical debut in 1957 at Teatro do Estudante, directed by Paschoal Carlos Magno, with the plays O Primo da California by Joaquim Manuel de Macedo and Catarina da Russia, alongside Herval Rossano. In 1986, she worked on the play Lily, Lily, which earned her acclaim and, in 1989, she founded the Teatro Israelita de Comédia, in order to produce and present the dramaturgy by Jewish authors. In 2003, she acted in Anton Chekhov's play Uncle Vanya, directed by Aderbal Freire Filho. In 2006, she was part of the cast of Rainha Esther, directed by Leon Góes. Between 2007 and 2009, she participated in 7, o Musical, her last work in theater, with Charles Möeller and Cláudio Botelho.

== Cinema ==
Gomes made her cinematographic debut in 1963 in the film Bonitinha, mas Ordinária. She acted in other great successes such as O Mundo Alegre de Helô (1967), A Penúltima Donzela (1969), O Casal (1975), Copacabana (2001), and others.

== Death ==
Gomes died on November 22, 2009, victim of cardiac arrest, a consequence of pneumonia, at the age of 85 and after a 65-year-long career, at the Hospital Samaritano in Rio de Janeiro. She was buried in São João de Meriti. Ida Gomes had already been selected as the great honoree at the 21st edition of the Shell Prize for Theater in Rio de Janeiro, for her longstanding contribution to the Brazilian theater. According to her relatives, she was happily preparing her thanksgiving speech.

== Family ==
She was the sister of the Brazilian actor Felipe Wagner and aunt of the Brazilian actress Debora Olivieri and the musician Daniel Szafran.

== Career ==
=== Television ===
Year	Title	Role	Notes
1951	Grande Teatro Tupi	Vários Personagens	
1953	Coração Delator	Noca	
1957	A Canção de Bernadete	Irmã Má	
1967	A Rainha Louca	Astrid	
1968	A Gata de Vison	Rose Parker	
1968	A Ponte dos Suspiros	Rainha Sílvia Candiano	
1969	A Última Valsa	Condessa Matilde	
1969	Verão Vermelho	Jandira Serrano	
1970	Pigmalião 70	Júlia	
1970	A Próxima Atração	Zilda	
1971	O Homem que Deve Morrer	Júlia	
1972	Selva de Pedra	Mme. Heloise Katzuki	
1972	Caso Especial	—N/a	(episode:A Dama das Camélias)
1973	O Bem-Amado	Doroteia Cajazeira	
1974	Fogo Sobre Terra	Frida	
1974	Caso Especial	—N/a	Enquanto a Cegonha não Vem; Feliz Na Ilusão
1975	Helena	Úrsula	
1975	Senhora	Emília Camargo	
1975	O Grito	Branca	
1976	Estúpido Cupido	Madre Encarnación	
1977	Dona Xepa	Isabel Becker	
1977	O Astro	Tia Magda	
1978	Pecado Rasgado	Aída	
1980	O Bem-Amado	Doroteia Cajazeira	1980-1984
1985	De Quina pra Lua	Urânia	
1986	Memórias de um Gigolô	Zizi de La Rocha	
1986	Hipertensão	Ma Mére	
1987	Expresso Brasil	Doroteia Cajazeira	
1988	Vida Nova	Madre Superiora	
1989	República	Dona Marianinha da Fonseca	
1990	Delegacia de Mulheres	Eva Braun	(episode:Formicida e Guaraná)
1990	Gente Fina	Eudóxia Paranhos Bragança do Amaral	
1992	Você Decide	—N/a	(episode:Achados e Perdidos)
1992	De Corpo e Alma	Bela Lopes Jordão	
1994	Você Decide	—N/a	(episode:Anjos sem Asas)
1995	Você Decide	—N/a	(episode:O Gosto da Vingança)
1995	Cara & Coroa	Irmã Domitila	
1998	Você Decide	—N/a	(episode:O Rapto da Sogra)
1998	Era uma Vez...	Madre Superiora	
1999	Chiquinha Gonzaga	Madre Superiora	
1999	Você Decide	—N/a	(episódio:Dupla Traição)
2001	A Padroeira	Zuleika	
2003	Os Normais	Dona Mimi	(episode:O Magnífico Antepenúltimo)
2004	Linha Direta Justiça	Elisa Amaral	(episode:O Naufrágio do Bateau Mouche)
2005	A Diarista	Dona Amélia	(episode:Asilo é se Lhe Parece)
2005	Bang Bang	Irmã Encarnación	
2005	Malhação	Helga	
2006	JK	Irmã Maria	
2006	Sob Nova Direção	Tia Esmeralda	(episode:Fiança Esperança)
2006	Pé na Jaca	Madre Superiora	
2007	Duas Caras	Dona Frida	

=== Cinematography ===
Year	Title	Role
1963	Bonitinha Mas Ordinária	Heitor's wife
1967	O Mundo Alegre de Helô	Nurse
1969	A Penúltima Donzela	Wanda's mother
1975	O Casal	Maria Lúcia's mother
1977	O Seminarista	—N/a
1979	Amante Latino	Teacher
1989	Primeiro de Abril, Brasil	—N/a
2001	Copacabana	Fanny
2003	Rua Alguem 5555: My Father	Jewish lady in the cemetery
2006	O Amigo Invisível	Ms. Werner
2009	Destino	Joana

=== Theater ===
Year	Title
1945	As Rosas do Verão
1946	Aquela Ocasião
1947	Maria, Maria
1947	Rosário
1949	Paraíso Original
1950	Os Mendigos de Copacabana
1950	Violetta e Viriatto
1952	Viagens do Céu
1953	Eu Acredito no Amor
1953	Além de Nós
1956	Colombo
1957	O Primo da Califórnia
1957	Assim Falou Juca Pato
1958	Catarina da Rússia
1961	O Parceiro Esquecido
1963	A Rua
1965	As Feiticeiras de Salém
1966	O Teatro Através dos Tempos
1966	Um Crime contra Amélia
1969	O Juíz
1971	Fiddler on the Roof
1978	A Pequena Loja de Horrores
1982	A Guerra das Rosas
1983	O Senhor do Sol
1986	Lily, Lily
1990	No Natal a Gente Vem te Buscar!
1991	A Fada Mofada
2002	Bodas de Ouro
2003	The Miser
2003-2004	Uncle Vanya
2006	Rainha Esther
2007-2009	Sete, O Musical

=== Dubbing ===
- Recurring voice of Joan Crawford
- Recurring voice of Bette Davis
- Marie Therese Vauzou (Gladys Cooper) in The Song of Bernadette
- Madame Medusa (Geraldine Page) in The Rescuers
- Madame Mim (Martha Wentworth) in The Sword in the Stone
- Aunt Sponge (Miriam Margolyes) in James and the Giant Peach
