= Francisco Cuoco =

Brazilian actor (1933–2025)

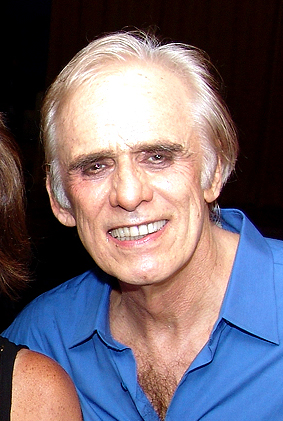
- Cuoco in 2006
- Born: 29 November 1933; São Paulo, Brazil
- Died: 19 June 2025 (aged 91); São Paulo, Brazil
- Other names: Chico Cuoco
- Occupation: Actor
- Years active: 1957–2025
- Spouse: Carminha Brandão (1960-1964)

Francisco Cuoco (29 November 1933 – 19 June 2025) was a Brazilian actor. He became known for his roles as a heartthrob in telenovelas from Rede Globo, such as Selva de Pedra (1972), Pecado Capital (1975) and O Astro (1977), among others.

== Life and career ==
Cuoco was born in São Paulo, the son of the Italian fair trader Leopoldo Cuoco. He grew up in Brás neighborhood, with his sister Grácia and his mother Antonieta.

He worked during the day with his father at the fair and at night he studied, seeking a stable profession. He wanted to study Law, but when he got in touch with the School of Dramatic Art of Alfredo Mesquita, he decided to be a dramaturgy professional. He dropped out of law school and gave himself up to the artistic vocation.

After graduation, Cuoco worked in several pieces of the companies Teatro Brasileiro de Comédia, Teatro dos Sete and Companhia Nídia Lícia. His first protagonist in the theater was with Werneck, in Nelson Rodrigues' play O Beijo no Asfalto. The first grand prize at the theater for the play Boeing Boeing.

In 1962, Cuoco made his feature film debut, a supporting character in Pedro e Paulo. In 1968, he starred in Anuska, Manequim e Mulher (by Francisco Ramalho Jr.).

With intense theater production in the 1950s and 1960s, Francisco Cuoco joined television, where he performed teletheatres on defunct TV Tupi, and telenovelas on TV Excelsior. He was later hired by TV Globo, where he participated in more than 100 productions.

=== Personal life and death ===
Cuoco was married to actress Carminha Brandão, twelve years older than him, between 1960 and 1964. He later married Gina Rodrigues, with whom he had three children: Tatiana, Rodrigo and Diogo. The couple divorced in 1984.

In 2013, he got engaged to fashion designer Thaís Almeida, who was 27 at the time. In December 2017, he announced the end of the relationship and said that his ex-wife, Gina, had moved into his apartment, but only as friends. In March 2021, the actor launched his YouTube channel.

Francisco Cuoco died on June 19, 2025, at the age of 91, as a result of multiple organ failure. He had been hospitalized for 20 days at the Albert Einstein Hospital in São Paulo due to the health problems he had been facing in recent years. Towards the end of his life, Cuoco was dealing with walking problems and lived with his sister, Grácia Cuoco.

== Controversies ==
In 1998, Cuoco had a series of disagreements with actress Carolina Ferraz, who at the time played his romantic partner in the remake of Pecado Capital and allegedly refused to kiss him or record many romantic scenes alongside him. In view of the conflicts between the two, writer Glória Perez had to create a new character, played by Vera Fischer, to be Cuoco's partner. In interviews, Cuoco even said that Ferraz was unmanageable. Years later, the actress revealed that the hurt between the two had been overcome.

In November 2006, while in Rio de Janeiro and driving to the Teatro Miguel Falabella, where he was performing in the play O Último Bolero, Francisco Cuoco was the victim of a kidnapping. The actor, his driver and the play's producer, Tatiana Amaral, were stopped by a vehicle with seven assailants. The bandits took the three of them and drove around in the actor's car for about 20 minutes, until they decided to leave them in the São Cristóvão neighborhood.

They took everything out of my pocket and asked for my bank codes. I thought I was going to die.

— Cuoco, in an interview with RedeTV!

In 2022, model Anthony Junior went to court claiming to be Cuoco's son, the result of an affair with his mother, although the actor denied it. A DNA test resulted negative for Cuoco's paternity.

== Filmography ==
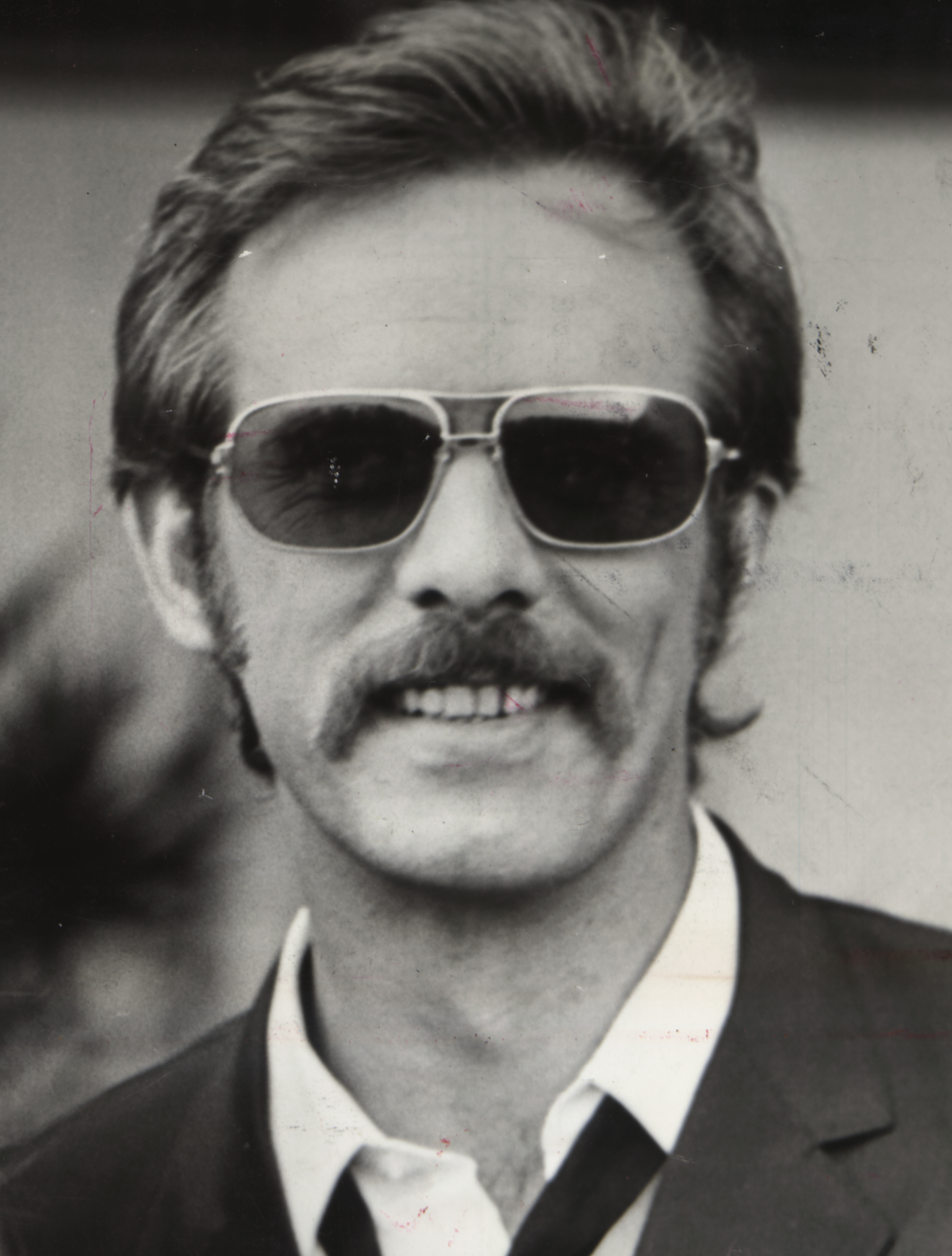
Cuoco in 1971

=== Television ===
- 2025 – Tributo .... Himself
- 2023 – No Corre .... Himself (special participation)
- 2020 – Salve-se Quem Puder .... Himself (special participation)
- 2019 – Juntos a Magia Acontece .... Padre Francisco
- 2019 – Tá no Ar: a TV na TV .... Himself
- 2018 – Segundo Sol .... Nestor Maranhão
- 2018 – Pega Pega .... Mr. Chico (special participation)
- 2016 – Sol Nascente .... Gaetano De Angeli
- 2015 – I Love Paraisópolis .... Evaristo Mateus Salsete, Sr. (special participation)
- 2014 – Doce de Mãe .... Fortunato de Souza (Toninho)
- 2014 – Boogie Oogie .... Vicente Santos
- 2014 – A Grande Família .... Oduvaldo Carrara (1 episode)
- 2014 – Amor à Vida ....Rubão Carvalho (special participation)
- 2012 – A Vida da Gente .... Mariano Vilaça (special participation)
- 2011 – O Astro .... Ferragus
- 2010 – Passione .... Olavo da Silva
- 2010 – A Princesa e o Vagabundo .... Germain
- 2008 – Casos e Acasos .... Dr. Anísio / Dr. Edgar
- 2008 – Negócio da China.... Evandro Fontanera
- 2008 – Dicas de Um Sedutor....Geraldo
- 2008 – Dança dos Famosos (reality show - Domingão do Faustão)
- 2008 – Duas Caras .... Ele mesmo (special participation)
- 2007 – Casos e Acasos .... Feldman / Edgar
- 2007 – Toma Lá, Dá Cá .... Dr. Pauleta (episóde "Galinha que come pedra")
- 2007 – Amazônia, de Galvez a Chico Mendes .... Augusto (terceira fase)
- 2006 – Cobras e Lagartos .... Omar Pasquim (Vicentino Pereira)
- 2005 – América .... Zé Higino (José da Silva Higino)
- 2004 – Da Cor do Pecado .... Pai Gaudêncio
- 2003 – Como Educar Seus Pais (especial)
- 2003 – Agora É que São Elas .... pai de Juca Tigre (participação)
- 2002 – A Grande Família .... Oduvaldo Carrara (pai de Agostinho)
- 2001 – O Clone .... padre Matiolli
- 2001 – As Filhas da Mãe .... Fausto Cavalcante
- 2001 – Sai de Baixo .... Lindovando Batista (participação)
- 2000 – Você Decide .... Padre
- 2000 – Brava Gente .... Almeida Guimarães
- 1998 – Dona Flor e Seus Dois Maridos .... Garcia
- 1998 – Pecado Capital .... Salviano Lisboa
- 1998 – Sai de Baixo .... Ney / Neila
- 1997 – A Justiceira (seriado) .... pai de Diana
- 1997 – Malhação .... Orestes
- 1997 – Você Decide .... Jair Pinheiro
- 1996 – Quem É Você? .... Nelson Maldonado
- 1996 – Visita de Natal .... Homeless father
- 1995 – A Próxima Vítima - Hélio Ribeiro
- 1995 – Memórias de Um Sargento de Milícias .... Vidigal
- 1994 – Tropicaliente .... Gaspar Velasquez
- 1993 - Menino de Engenho .... Coronel José Paulino (telefilm)
- 1992 – Deus Nos Acuda .... Otto Bismark
- 1990 – Lua Cheia de Amor .... Diego Miranda / Esteban Garcia
- 1989 – O Salvador da Pátria .... Severo Toledo Blanco
- 1987 – O Outro .... Paulo Della Santa / Denizard de Matos
- 1983 – Caso Especial .... Rodolfo Cavalcanti Méier
- 1983 – Eu Prometo .... Lucas Cantomaia
- 1982 – Sétimo Sentido .... Tião Bento
- 1981 – Obrigado Doutor (seriado) .... Rodrigo Junqueira
- 1979 – Os Gigantes .... Chico (Francisco Rubião)
- 1979 – Feijão Maravilha .... delegado (special participation)
- 1977 – O Astro .... Herculano Quintanilha
- 1976 – Duas Vidas .... Victor Amadeu
- 1976 – Saramandaia .... Tiradentes (special participation)
- 1975 – Pecado Capital .... Carlão (José Carlos Moreno)
- 1975 – Cuca Legal .... Mário Barroso
- 1973 – O Semideus .... Alex Garcia
- 1972 – Selva de Pedra .... Cristiano Vilhena
- 1971 – O Cafona .... Gilberto Athayde
- 1970 – Assim na Terra como no Céu .... Vítor Mariano
- 1969 – Sangue do Meu Sangue .... Carlos e Lúcio
- 1968 – Legião dos Esquecidos .... Felipe
- 1966 – Redenção .... dr. Fernando Silveira
- 1966 – Almas de Pedra .... Felipe
- 1965 – Renúncia .... Miguel
- 1965 – O Pecado de Cada Um .... Daniel
- 1965 – Os Quatro Filhos .... Luís
- 1964 – Banzo .... Mário
- 1964 – Marcados pelo Amor .... Victor
- 1963 – A Morta Sem Espelho .... Dr. Odorico
- 1963 – Pouco Amor Não É Amor
- 1957-59 – Grande Teatro Tupi .... Various characters

=== Cinema ===
- 1960 – Grande Sertão
- 1961 – Pedro e Paulo
- 1968 – Anuska, Manequim e Mulher
- 1998 – Traição
- 1999 – Gêmeas
- 2000 – Um Anjo Trapalhão
- 2001 – Os Xeretas
- 2005 – Cafundó
- 2006 – Didi - O Caçador de Tesouros
- 2015 – Real Beleza

=== Internet ===
- 2020 – A Vida dos Santos .... Narrator

== Theater ==
- 1955 – O Anúncio Feito à Maria
- 1956 – As Três Irmãs
- 1957 – A Bilha Quebrada
- 1957 – Os Apaixonados Pueris
- 1957 – A Madona de Éfeso
- 1958 – A Pedreira das Almas
- 1959 – A Senhoria
- 1959 – Quando se Morre de Amor
- 1959 – Romanoff e Julieta
- 1960 – Cristo Proclamado
- 1960 – Com a Pulga atrás da Orelha
- 1960 – Mambembe
- 1961 – O Beijo no Asfalto
- 1961 – O Médico Volante
- 1961 – O Velho Ciumento
- 1962 – O Homem, a Besta e a Virtude
- 1962 – Panorama Visto da Ponte
- 1964 – Boeing Boeing
- 1965 – Boeing-Airbus
- 1967 – A Infidelidade ao Alcance de Todos
- 1969 – O Assalto
- 1985 – Hedda Gabler
- 2005 – Os Três Homens Baixos
- 2006 – O Último Bolero
- 2007 – Paixão de Cristo de Nova Jerusalém
- 2008 – Circuncisão em Nova York
- 2009 – Deus É Química
- 2012 – Judy Garlandy e o Fim do Arco Íris
- 2013 – Uma Vida no Teatro
- 2015 – Electra
- 2017 – Paixão e Morte de Um Homem

== Awards and nominations ==
=== APCA Awards ===
Year	Category	Nominee / work	Result
1964	Best Featured Supporting Actor in a Play	Boeing Boeing	Won

=== Art Quality Brazil Awards ===
Year	Category	Nominee / work	Result
2005	Best Supporting Actor – Television	América	Won

=== Best of the Year – Globe Awards ===
Year	Category	Nominee / work	Result
2018	Mário Lago Trophy	—N/a	Won

=== Brasília Film Festival ===
Year	Category	Nominee / work	Result
1998	Candango for Best Supporting Actor	Traição	Won

=== Contigo! Awards ===
Year	Category	Nominee / work	Result
2011	Special Award	—N/a	Won

=== Guarani Film Awards ===
Year	Category	Nominee / work	Result
2015	Best Supporting Actor	Real Beleza	Nominated

=== Press Trophy ===
Year	Category	Nominee / work	Result
1967	Outstanding Performance by an Actor in a Telenovela	Redenção	Won
1968	Outstanding Performance by an Actor in a Telenovela	Redenção	Won
1969	Outstanding Performance by an Actor in a Telenovela	Redenção	Nominated
1970	Outstanding Performance by an Actor in a Telenovela	Sangue do Meu Sangue	Nominated
1971	Outstanding Performance by an Actor in a Telenovela	Assim na Terra como no Céu	Nominated
1972	Outstanding Performance by an Actor in a Telenovela	O Cafona	Won
1973	Outstanding Performance by an Actor in a Telenovela	Selva de Pedra	Won
1974	Outstanding Performance by an Actor in a Telenovela	O Semideus	Nominated
1988	Outstanding Performance by an Actor in a Telenovela	O Outro	Nominated
