= Guerra Conjugal =

1975 film by Joaquim Pedro de Andrade

- Directed by: Joaquim Pedro de Andrade
- Written by: Joaquim Pedro de Andrade
- Story by: Dalton Trevisan
- Produced by: Joaquim Pedro de Andrade
- Starring: Lima Duarte; Joffre Soares; Carmem Silva
- Cinematography: Pedro de Moraes
- Edited by: Eduardo Escorel
- Music by: Ian Guest
- Production companies: Filmes do Serro; Indústria Cinematográfica Brasileira
- Distributed by: Globo Vídeo
- Release date: 1975
- Running time: 93 minutes
- Country: Brazil
- Language: Portuguese

Guerra Conjugal (English: Conjugal Warfare) is a 1975 Brazilian film directed by Joaquim Pedro de Andrade. The screenplay is an adaptation of Dalton Trevisan's short stories.

== Cast ==
- Carmen Silva... Amália
- Joffre Soares... Joãozinho
- Oswaldo Louzada... João Corno
- Elza Gomes... Dona Gabriela (a avó chata cega)
- Cristina Aché... Neusa, a "Neusinha"
- Carlos Gregório... Nelsinho
- Carlos Kroeber... João Bicha
- Maria Lúcia Dahl... Lúcia
- Wilza Carla... Gorda (Maria's mother)
- Lima Duarte... Dr. Osíris
- Dirce Migliaccio... D. Laura
- Ítala Nandi... Olga
- Analu Prestes... Maria da Perdição
- Maria Veloso... Sofia, Velha Querida
- Zélia Zamyr... Maria da Gorda
- Lutero Luiz... Joãozinho's son
- Virgínia Moreira... old prostitute

== Awards ==
1975: Brasília Film Festival

1. Best Film (won)
2. Best Director (Joaquim Pedro de Andrade) (won)
3. Best Editing (Eduardo Escorel) (won)

1976: São Paulo Association of Art Critics Awards

1. Best Actor (Carlos Gregório) (won)
