= Duas Caras =

Brazilian telenovela

- Genre: Telenovela
- Created by: Aguinaldo Silva
- Directed by: Wolf Maya
- Starring: Antônio Fagundes; Dalton Vigh; Renata Sorrah; Susana Vieira; Marjorie Estiano; Débora Falabella; Letícia Spiller; Lázaro Ramos; Betty Faria; Stênio Garcia; Alinne Moraes; Vanessa Giácomo; Flávia Alessandra; Caco Ciocler; José Wilker; Marília Pêra
- Opening theme: "E Vamos à Luta" by Gonzaguinha
- Country of origin: Brazil
- Original language: Portuguese
- No. of episodes: 210; 160 (International version)

Production
- Editors: Paulo Jorge Correia; Robinson Lima; Alberto Gouvea; Wilson Fragoso
- Camera setup: Multi-camera
- Running time: 50 minutes

Original release
- Network: TV Globo
- Release: 1 October 2007 – 31 May 2008

Duas Caras (English: Two Faces) is a Brazilian telenovela produced and broadcast by TV Globo from 1 October 2007 to 31 May 2008, replacing Paraíso Tropical and followed by A Favorita. It is created by Aguinaldo Silva and directed by Wolf Maya. Starring Dalton Vigh, Marjorie Estiano, Alinne Moraes, Débora Falabella, Lázaro Ramos, Letícia Spiller, Betty Faria, Flávia Alessandra, Renata Sorrah, Suzana Vieira, and Antônio Fagundes.

It is the first telenovela by Rede Globo to be produced in high-definition.

The telenovela spans through Maria Paula's revenge against Marconi Ferraço, her ex-husband that robbed her of all her inheritance.

== Premise ==
In the past, as Adalberto Rangel, he met and seduced Maria Paula. With a calculated coldheart, he married her, stole her fortune, then abandoned her, unaware she was pregnant at the time. Ten years later, accompanied by her son Renato, Maria Paula plots to recover her dignity and to find justice by getting revenge against the indignities done to her.

== Plot ==
Adalberto Rangel, born Juvenaldo, lived with his poor father and siblings in a favela. Having no way to sustain the family, his father sold him (a boy) to Hermógenes Rangel, a thief. Some time later, Adalberto decides to make his own fortune without depending on his mentor. He steals all of Hermógenes' money, and flees.

During the escape, a serious car accident occurs, killing a couple. While searching the dead couple's car, Adalberto discovers a suitcase containing money, pictures and personal effects of their daughter. He proceeds to the fictitious city of Passaredo (adapted from São Bento do Sul, Santa Catarina) to meet the orphaned Maria Paula.

Adalberto lies to Maria, telling her that he was asked by her parents to care for her. The heiress's friends try to alert her, but she won't listen. Adalberto asks Maria Paula to marry him. She is swept off her feet by the con man. Not long after the wedding, Adalberto disappears. He leaves Maria absolutely nothing. Adalberto changes his entire life, including his name, home (in Rio de Janeiro) and lifestyle. He even has plastic surgery to change his face. The only person he shares his secret with is Bárbara Carreira – a prostitute to whom he lost his virginity. Adalberto, or Dr. Marconi Ferraço, makes his name as a respectable construction entrepreneur.

Some years later, Maria Paula relocates in Rio de Janeiro. She sees a news report about Ferraço, and recognizes him as her husband. She starts to track him down.

With a new identity and a lot of money in his pocket, Ferraço decides to conquer the beautiful Sílvia. She falls in love with the man she knows as Ferraço and accepts his offer of marriage. Maria Paula gatecrashes the engagement party and makes a big scene. Silvia remains engaged to him, and he becomes her first great love. Sílvia and Maria Paula both vie for Marconi Ferraço's attention. It remains unknown whether Maria Paula is interested in love or in revenge. Sílvia is slowly revealed as a psychopath, willing to go to extremes to stay with Ferraço.

Branca, Silvia's mother, discovers on the day following her husband João Pedro's death that he had an extra-marital affair for over twenty years with Célia Mara. Branca assumes her husband's place as the president of the Universidade Pessoa de Moraes. She transforms it in an institution of excellence.

Branca's brother is Paulo Barreto (Barretão), a human rights activist. He is married to Gioconda, a great lady of the carioca society, who is a snob and a gossip. The two are parents of Júlia, a very intelligent and active girl, who fell in love with Evilásio Caó, a black man from the Portelinha favela. Thus, race and class prejudices were revealed in the family.

Portelinha was created from the determination of Juvenal Antena, born leader, smart and compassionate. Juvenal was the head of a builders' union, the GPN, who brought workers from the Northeast. The workers were told that they would receive their fees from the failed company. When the claim proved to be false, they rioted at the injustice. Juvenal resigned his position and joined the workers in their fight. He dreamt of joining those families without a home and creating a community. Though his dream was a big stretch of the imagination, Juvenal met with other demonstrators respected by the group: the Lady Setembrina, the evangelical shepherd Inácio Lisboa, the carpenter Misael Caó, the father of Evilásio and a van owner Geraldo Peixeiro. With the help of Narciso Tellerman, the secretary of State of Social Service and the future deputy, Juvenal organized an invasion of the land owned by the GPN. Fired up by Juvenal's gift for words, they took over the land they wanted. There, the community of their dreams grew: the favela of Portelinha, where there are neither drugs nor violence, and a place where people will never be without.

Marconi Ferraço bought the land of GPN, and he enters into a judicial and moral battle against Juvenal Antena.

In the last few episodes, an alliance between Ferraco and Juvenal begins. Ferraco aids Juvenal in his suit against his godson. Juvenal's opinion of Ferraco changes. He advises Maria Paula to marry Ferraco to recover her money, and for the sake of her and Ferraco's son Renato. Renato adores his father, and knows nothing of his dark past.

Hoping to separate Ferraco and Maria Paula, Silvia sends an article concerning Ferraco's fraud to Renato. She starts to lose her mind. The boy fight with Ferraço, but soon forgives her father.

Silvia escapes the mental hospital where she was locked up and kidnaps Renato. She tries to kill Maria Paula and Ferraco, but Ferraço defends his wife. He is reached in place of Maria Paula and the two are reconciled. Silvia escapes without killing anyone, and while she is fleeing she is hit by a car driven by a handsome millionaire. He takes her to live in Paris with him. She contacts her accomplice, Joao Batista, who goes to Paris to work as her driver.

Ferraco confesses his crimes as part of the prenuptial agreement he signs in order to get Maria Paula to marry him again, and he goes to jail for two years. He tells Maria Paula that the only thing he hopes in exchange for his change of heart is to have her and their son waiting for him when he gets out of jail.

Two years later, he gets out and finds that Maria Paula stole all his money and went away with Renato. While he is sitting on a beach, asking himself why would she do that to him after all the proofs he gave of his love for her, he receives a phone call from Maria Paula. She asks him what it feels like to be betrayed. He answers that he never would have believed it of her. She interrupts him and tells him where his plane ticket is, because she is waiting for him with his son.

Ferraco arrives on a beautiful island, and finds Renato walking on the beach. He runs up to him and hugs him. Then, he sees Maria Paula, and asks her what the status is of their relationship. She tells him to stop wasting time and kiss her. Ferraco smiles and kisses her passionately.

== Notable cast ==
- Marjorie Estiano - Maria Paula Fonseca do Nascimento Ferreira
- Dalton Vigh - Marconi Ferraço (Adalberto Rangel / Juvenaldo Ferreira)
- Alinne Moraes - Maria Sílvia Barreto Pessoa de Moraes Main Villain
- Antônio Fagundes - Juvenal Antena (Juvenal Ferreira dos Santos)
- Susana Vieira - Branca Maria Barreto Pessoa de Moraes
- José Wilker - Francisco Macieira
- Renata Sorrah - Célia Mara de Andrade Couto Melgaço
- Lázaro Ramos - Evilásio Caó dos Santos
- Débora Falabella - Júlia de Queiroz Barreto Caó dos Santos
- Marília Pêra - Gioconda de Queiroz Barreto
- Stênio Garcia - Barretão (Paulo de Queiroz Barreto)
- Flávia Alessandra - Alzira de Andrade Correia
- Betty Faria - Bárbara Carreira
- Marília Gabriela - Guigui (Margarida McKenzie Salles Prado)
- Caco Ciocler - Claudius Maciel
- Marcos Winter - Mr. Narciso Tellerman
- Letícia Spiller - Maria Eva Monteiro Duarte
- Juliana Knust - Débora Vieira Melgaço
- Otávio Augusto - Antônio José Melgaço
- Sheron Menezes - Solange Couto Ferreira dos Santos Maciel
- Leona Cavalli - Dália Mendes
- Júlia Almeida - Fernanda Carreira da Conceição
- Júlio Rocha - JB (João Batista da Conceição)
- Nuno Leal Maia - Bernardo da Conceição
- Mara Manzan - Amara
- Rodrigo Hilbert - Ronildo (Guilherme McKenzie Salles Prado)
- Juliana Alves - Gislaine Caó dos Santos
- Ângelo Antônio - Dorgival Correia
- Paulo Goulart - Heriberto Gonçalves
- Viviane Victorette - Nadir
- Susana Ribeiro - Edivânia
- Cris Vianna - Sabrina Soares da Costa de Queiroz Barreto
- Marcela Barrozo - Ramona Monteiro Duarte
- Thaís de Campos - Claudine Bel-Lac
- Adriano Garib - Silvano
- Babú Santana - Montanha
- Tarcísio Meira - Hermógenes Rangel
- Laura Cardoso - Alice de Souza (Ferraço's mother)
- Herson Capri - João Pedro Pessoa de Moraes (Joca)
- Bia Seidl - Gabriela Fonseca do Nascimento
- Vanessa Giácomo - Luciana Alves Negroponte
- Eriberto Leão - Ítalo Negroponte
- Chica Xavier - Mãe Bina (Mother Bina) (Setembrina Caó dos Santos)
- Werner Schünemann - Humberto Silveira
- Vera Fischer - Dolores
- Luíza Brunet - Herself
- Martinho da Vila - Himself
- Tony Ramos - Himself
- Juliana Paes - Herself
- Francisco Cuoco - Himself
- Jean Wyllys - Himself
- Sérgio Viotti - Manuel de Andrade Couto
- Paulo César Pereio - Lobato (José Gregório dos Santos Lobato)
- Carlos Vereza - Helmut Erdmann
- Ida Gomes - Dona Frida (Mrs. Frida) (Mother of the wife of Helmut)
- Betty Lago - Soraya
- Matheus Costa - Leone Alves Negroponte
- Lady Francisco - Odete
- Pietro Mário - Fernando Pereira Salles Prado
- Adriana Alves - Condessa de Morena Finzi-Contini
- Ilva Niño - Risoleta
- Lionel Fischer - Mr. Arnaldo
- Fúlvio Stefanini - Waldemar Nascimento

== Soundtrack ==
=== Soundtrack With Brazilian Songs ===
The album containing the Portuguese songs that are part of the soundtrack:

1. Tá Perdoado - Maria Rita (Music theme of Maria Eva)
2. Trabalhador - Seu Jorge (Music theme of Juvenal Antena)
3. Delírio dos Mortais - Djavan (Music theme: City of Rio de Janeiro)
4. Oração ao Tempo - Caetano Veloso (Music theme of Maria Paula)
5. E Vamos á Luta - Gonzaguinha (Opening)
6. Canto de Oxum - Maria Bethânia (Music theme of Setembrina)
7. Ela Une Todas as Coisas - Jorge Vercilo (Track general Romantic)
8. Geraldinos e Arquibaldos - Chicas (Music theme of Bernardinho)
9. Negro Gato - MC Leozinho (Music theme of Evilásio)
10. Be Myself - Charlie Brown Jr. (Music theme of Marconi Ferraço)
11. Ternura - Isabella Taviani (Music theme of Célia Mara)
12. Toda Vez que Eu Digo Adeus - Cássia Eller (Music theme of Sílvia)
13. Você não Entende Nada - Celso Fonseca (Music theme of Dália, Bernardinho and Heraldo)
14. Folhetim - Luiza Possi (Music theme of Alzira)
15. Coisas que Eu Sei - Danni Carlos (Music theme of Júlia)
16. Quem Toma Conta de Mim - Paula Toller
17. Recomeçar - Aline Barros (the core issue of Evangelicals)
18. Call Me (Instrumental) - Victor Pozas (Music theme of Branca)
19. The Look of Love (Instrumental) (from Casino Royale) - Victor Pozas (Music theme of Gioconda)
20. Amores Cruzados - Ksis (Music theme of Débora)

=== International songs ===
The album containing the English songs that are part of the soundtrack:

1. No One - Alicia Keys
2. Let Me Out - Ben's Brother (Music theme of Benoliel)
3. Same Mistake - James Blunt (Music theme of Maria Paula and Ferraço)
4. Scared - Tiago Lorc (Music theme of Sílvia and Ferraço)
5. Lost Without You - Robin Thicke (Music theme of Sílvia)
6. Kiss Kiss - Chris Brown feat. T-Pain (Music theme of Zidane e Gyslaine)
7. So Much for You - Ashley Tisdale (Music theme of Alzira)
8. Gimme More - Britney Spears (Music theme of Texas Bar)
9. 2 Hearts - Kylie Minogue (Music theme of Débora)
10. How Deep Is Your Love - The Bird and the Bee (Music theme of Dália, Bernadinho e Heraldo)
11. You Are So Beautiful - Ivo Pessoa (Music theme of Júlia and Evilásio)
12. I'm All Right - Madeleine Peyroux (Music theme of Branca and Macieira)
13. The Look of Love (From Casino Royale) - Diana Krall (Music theme of Célia Mara)
14. Yesterday - Liverpool Kids (Music theme of Gioconda)
15. All She Wants (O Xote das Meninas) - Marina Elali (Music theme of Solange and Claudius)
16. You my Love - Double You (Music theme of Clarissa and Duda)

=== Instrumental music ===
The album containing the original score written by Victor Pozas and instrumental versions of the soundtrack:

1. Tema de Maria Paula (Music theme of Maria Paula) - Victor Pozas
2. E Vamos à Luta - Gonzaguinha
3. Tá Perdoado - Arlindo Cruz
4. Tema de Claudius (Music theme of Claudius) - Victor Pozas
5. Coisas que eu Sei - Dudu Falcão
6. O Trem Parte - Victor Pozas
7. Delírio dos Mortais - Djavan
8. Oração ao Tempo - Caetano Veloso
9. A Obra - Victor Pozas
10. Geraldinos e Arquibaldos - Gonzaguinha
11. A Descoberta - Victor Pozas
12. Tema de Hermógenes, Adalberto e Marconi (Music theme of Hermógenes, Adalberto and Marconi) - Victor Pozas
13. Folhetim - Chico Buarque
14. A Espera - Victor Pozas
15. Vida Alegre - Victor Pozas
16. Pot-Pourri: Sambas da Portelinha (Bônus Track) - Victor Pozas

== Brazil audience ==
Timeslot	# Eps.	Premiere		Finale		Rank	Season	Average viewership
Timeslot	# Eps.	Date	Viewers (in points)	Date	Viewers (in points)	Rank	Season	Average viewership
Monday—Saturday; 9:15 pm	210	October 1, 2007	40.0	May 31, 2008	—	#1	2007-08	41.1

== See also ==
- Rede Globo

Preceded by Paraíso Tropical (2007)	Duas Caras; October 1, 2007—May 31, 2008	Succeeded by A Favorita (2008/2009)
