= Maria Lúcia Dahl =

Brazilian actress (1941–2022)

- Born: 20 July 1941; Rio de Janeiro, Brazil
- Died: 16 June 2022 (aged 80); Rio de Janeiro, Brazil
- Education: Colégio Andrews
- Occupation: Actress

Maria Lúcia Dahl (20 July 1941 – 16 June 2022) was a Brazilian actress.

== Filmography ==
- Menino de Engenho (1965)
- A Grande Cidade (1966)
- Mar Corrente (1967)
- O Levante das Saias (1967)
- The Brave Warrior (1968)
- Macunaíma (1969)
- Guerra Conjugal (1974)
- Um Homem Célebre (1974)
- Motel (1975)
- Ipanema, Adeus (1975)
- Gordos e Magros (1976)
- Noite em Chamas (1977)
- A Árvore dos Sexos (1977)
- Gente Fina É Outra Coisa (1977)
- O Bom Marido (1978)
- Eu Matei Lúcio Flávio (1979)
- Terror e Êxtase (1979)
- O Gosto do Pecado (1980)
- Giselle (1980)
- I Love You (1981)
- Mulher Objeto (1981)
- Idolatrada
- See This Song (1994)
- Quem Matou Pixote? (1996)
- A Terceira Morte de Joaquim Bolívar (2000)
- Histórias do Olhar (2002)
- Mais uma Vez Amor (2005)
- O Gerente (2011)
