= Locomotivas =

- Genre: Telenovela
- Created by: Cassiano Gabus Mendes
- Directed by: Régis Cardoso
- Country of origin: Brazil
- Original language: Portuguese
- No. of episodes: 168

Production
- Running time: 40 minutes

Original release
- Network: TV Globo
- Release: 1 March – 12 September 1977

Related
- Estúpido Cupido; Sem Lenço, sem Documento

Locomotivas (Eng: Locomotives) is a Brazilian telenovela produced and broadcast by TV Globo. It premiered on 1 March 1977 and ended on 12 September 1977, with a total of 168 episodes. It's the nineteenth "novela das sete" to be aired at the timeslot. It is created by Cassiano Gabus Mendes and directed by Régis Cardoso.

== Cast ==
Actor	Character
Eva Todor	Maria Josefina Cabral (Kiki Blanche)
Walmor Chagas	Fábio Almeida
Aracy Balabanian	Milena Cabral
Lucélia Santos	Fernanda Cabral
Dennis Carvalho	Netinho
Elizângela	Patrícia Mello
Ilka Soares	Celeste
Rogério Fróes	Sérgio Mello
Miriam Pires	Margarida
João Carlos Barroso	Paulo Cabral
Thaís de Andrade	Renata Cabral
Tony Correia	Alberto César Machado (Machadinho)
Maria Cristina Nunes	Graça (Gracinha)
Terezinha Sodré	Lourdes (Lurdinha)
Roberto Pirillo	Cássio
Lady Francisco	Carla Lambrini
Hélio Souto	Zé Tião
Suzy Arruda	Mirtes Mello
Isaac Bardavid	Víctor
Eloísa Mafalda	Joana
Célia Biar	Sílvia Almeida
Gilberto Martinho	Gervásio Lambrini
Carmem Silva	Adelaide Cabral
Oswaldo Louzada	Francisco (Chico Rico)
Joséphine Hélene	Zulmira
Edson Silva	Marco Aurélio
Miriam Fischer	Lia Almeida
Gisela Rocha	Regina Cabral
