= Renata Fronzi =

Argentine-Brazilian actress (1925–2008)

- Fronzi in 1958
- Born: Renata Mirra Ana Maria Fronzi; August 1, 1925; Rosario, Santa Fe, Argentina
- Died: April 15, 2008 (aged 82); Rio de Janeiro, Brazil
- Occupation: Actress

Renata Mirra Ana Maria Fronzi (August 1, 1925 – April 15, 2008) was an Argentine-born Brazilian television and film actress. She was well known for her role as the character, Helena, in the Brazilian television show, Família Trapo. Família Trapo aired on TV Record, the commercial name for Rede Record, from 1967 until 1971. Fronzi appeared on the show opposite a number of actors including Ronald Golias, Jô Soares, Otello Zeloni, Cidinha Campos and Renato Côrte Real.

== Early life ==
Renata Fronzi was born in the city of Rosario, Santa Fe, Argentina. She was the daughter of two Italian-Argentine theater actors. She first moved to Brazil with her parents and settled in Santos, Brazil, which is located along the Atlantic coast in São Paulo state.

== Career ==
Fronzi began her career by performing at the Theatro Municipal in São Paulo, Brazil. Her professional debut occurred in 1940 when she appeared in actress Eva Todor's theater company production of Na Peça Sol de Primavera. She also appeared on the big screen in several Brazilian films during her career, including several movies produced by Atlântida Cinematográfica film studio. Her television credits included Minha Doce Namorada in 1971, Pecado Rasgado in 1978, Chega Mais in 1980, Jogo da Vida in 1981, Corpo a Corpo in 1984 and A Idade da Loba in 1995. Many of her television roles and telenovelas, including Corpo a Corpo and Chega Mais, aired on Rede Globo. On television, Fronzi also had a recurring role in the telenovela, Malhação, from 1996 until 1997. She also appeared in the Brazilian miniseries, Memorial de Maria Moura, in 1994.

Fronzi's most recent film roles included Copacabana, directed by Carla Camurati, and the 2005 film Coisa de Mulher, directed by Brazilian director, Eliana Fonseca.

== Personal life ==
=== Death ===
Renata Fronzi died at the age of 82 of multiple organ dysfunction syndrome, which was brought on by diabetes, on April 15, 2008, at the Hospital Municipal Lourenço Jorge in the Barra da Tijuca neighborhood of western Rio de Janeiro. She had been hospitalized in the intensive care unit of the hospital since April 1, 2008.

Fronzi was the widow of Brazilian radio announcer, César Ladeira, whom she had married in the 1940s. She was also the mother of Brazilian screenwriter, César Ladeira Filho.

== Filmography ==
=== Television ===
Year	Title	Role	Notes
1956-1965	Teatrinho Trol	Various characters	
1966	O Rei dos Ciganos	Tânia	
1967-1971	Família Trapo	Helena	
1971-1973	Faça Humor, Não Faça Guerra	Various characters	
1971	Minha Doce Namorada	Marianita	
1972	Bicho do Mato	Ivete Chaves Nogueira	
1972	A Patota	Carmen	
1973	O Semideus	Paloma Figueira	
1973	Satiricom	Various characters	
1974	Corrida do Ouro	Suzana Brito	
1976	Planeta dos Homens		Special participation
1978	Pecado Rasgado	Rachel	
1980	Chega Mais	Agda Maia	
1980	Dulcinéa Vai à Guerra	Ludmila	
1981	Jogo da Vida	Aurélia Creonte	
1983	Pão Pão, Beijo Beijo	Loreta Junqueti	
1984	Transas e Caretas	Sônia Braga	
1984	Corpo a Corpo	Zoraide Motta	
1984	Partido Alto	Juror	Special participation
1985-1989	Bronco	Helena Dinozzauro	
1985	Ti Ti Ti	Teodora Diniz	Special participation
1990	A História de Ana Raio e Zé Trovão	Gióia Bérgamo	Special participation
1990	Mico Preto	Amelinha	
1990	Delegacia de Mulheres	Dulce Canavieira	Episode: "Chantagem Eletrônica"
1994	Memorial de Maria Moura	Aldenora	
1995	A Idade da Loba	Gertrudes	
1996	Malhação de Verão	Dona Jasmim Salgueiro	
1996-1997	Malhação	Dona Jasmim Salgueiro	Season 2–3
1999-2000	Zorra Total	Various characters	
1999	Você Decide	Mother	Episode: "Faça a Coisa Certa"

=== Film ===
Year	Title	Role
1946	Fantasma por Acaso	Steward
1946	Segura Esta Mulher	—N/a
1954	Guerra ao Samba	Companion of Libório
1954	Toda Vida em Quinze Minutos	Herself
1955	Carnaval em Lá Maior	Lola
1957	Garotas e Samba	Naná
1957	De Pernas pro Ar	Jenny
1957	Treze Cadeiras	Ivone
1957	Hoje o Gato sou Eu	Lúcia
1958	Pé na Tábua	Rosali
1958	É de Chuá!	Maria Xangai
1959	O Espírito de Porco	Geraldina
1959	Massagista de Madame	Madame
1960	Pistoleiro Bossa Nova	Lili
1960	Vai que É Mole	Reporter
1960	Marido de Mulher Boa	Leal
1961	Briga, Marido e Samba	Mira Diller
1963	O Homem que Roubou a Copa do Mundo	—N/a
1963	Quero Essa Mulher Assim Mesmo	—N/a
1968	As Aventuras de Chico Valente	Guilhermina
1968	Papai Trapalhão	Desdêmona
1970	Salário Mínimo	Angelina
1971	Como Ganhar na Loteria sem Perder a Esportiva	Guiomar
1975	Um Soutien para Papai	Gracinha
1976	Esse Rio Muito Louco	Kiki
1976	Kiki Vai à Guerra	Kiki
1977	A Louca de Ipanema	Lady
1981	Mulher de Programa	Cafetina
1982	Como Matar Uma Sogra	Mother-in-law
1996	Il barbiere di Rio	Angelina
2001	Copacabana	Noêmia
2002	Dead in the Water	Employee
2005	Coisa de Mulher	Dona Yolanda
2007	A Infância	Herself
