= Os Gigantes =

- Genre: Telenovela
- Created by: Lauro César Muniz
- Directed by: Régis Cardoso; Jardel Mello
- Starring: Dina Sfat; Monique Curi; Francisco Cuoco; Tarcísio Meira; Susana Vieira; Joana Fomm; Vera Fischer; Mário Lago; Roberto de Cleto; Miriam Pires; Lauro Corona; Lídia Brondi; Castro Gonzaga
- Opening theme: "Horizonte Aberto" by Sérgio Mendes and Gracinha Leporace
- Country of origin: Brazil
- Original language: Portuguese
- No. of episodes: 147

Production
- Running time: 50 minutes

Original release
- Network: TV Globo
- Release: 20 August 1979 – 2 February 1980

Related
- Pai Herói; Água Viva

Os Gigantes is a Brazilian telenovela produced and broadcast by TV Globo. It premiered on 20 August 1979 and ended on 2 February 1980, with a total of 147 episodes. It's the twenty third "novela das oito" to be aired on the timeslot. It is created and written by Lauro César Muniz and directed by Régis Cardoso and Jardel Mello. It was considered a major failure, due to its controversial themes and the depressing and dark storyline.

== Plot ==
Paloma Gurgel, a famous and respected journalist, returns to Brazil after a period working abroad as an international correspondent, to solve family problems caused by the situation of her twin brother, Frederico Gurgel, who is in a coma in hospital after emergency brain surgery and is alive thanks to the help of devices. Distressed by her brother's suffering, and after listening to some tapes of his pleas, Paloma decides to turn off the devices that are keeping him alive. From then on, a legal battle begins between the journalist and her sister-in-law Veridiana, with whom she has always had a bad relationship, who accuses her of having practiced euthanasia, and also blames her for a miscarriage suffered after Fred's death. Paloma is also reunited with two childhood friends: farmer Fernando Lucas and doctor Francisco Rubião, both of whom are in love with her and have fought to win her over. Fernando has a troubled marriage to Vânia; and Francisco breaks off his engagement to Helena because of Paloma.

== Production ==
The telenovela dealt with controversial issues at the time, such as euthanasia and homosexuality. Projected as a controversial plot, the soap opera generated a major crisis at Globo. The novela's actress, Dina Sfat, was unhappy with the show and her character's direction. Loud and clear, she demonstrated her lack of interest in the story. The dissatisfaction was so great that the actress broke off relations with author Lauro César Muniz. The plot was also full of criticism of multinational companies. They didn't like this at all and put pressure on Globo to make changes quickly.

Unable to save the soap opera, Lauro César Muniz was fired before the end. Benedito Ruy Barbosa was asked to write the last chapter and refused. Walter George Durst wrote the last chapter, which culminated in the protagonist's suicide.

Scenes were shot in Vassouras, Rio de Janeiro.

It was Maria Adelaide Amaral's debut as a screenwriter. She wrote 18 chapters and took over the plot when Lauro César Muniz left the novela.

The novela was not a ratings success, the reasons being the controversial themes it tackled and the plot considered “morbid”, ‘gloomy’ and “depressing”. Only the first and last chapters were preserved.

== Cast ==
- Dina Sfat - Paloma Gurgel
- Francisco Cuoco - Francisco Rubião (Chico)
- Tarcísio Meira - Fernando Lucas
- Susana Vieira - Veridiana Gurgel
- Joana Fomm - Vânia Lucas
- Vera Fischer - Helena
- Mário Lago - Antônio Lucas
- Lauro Corona - Polaco
- Lídia Brondi - Renata
- Jonas Mello - Victor
- Rogério Fróes - Dr. Osvaldo
- Castro Gonzaga - Amadeu
- Flora Geny - Ivone
- Miriam Pires - Eulália Gurgel
- Norah Fontes - Matilde
- Perry Salles - Novak
- Cleyde Blota - Selma
- Fábio Mássimo - Ciro
- Mayara Norbin - Ana
- Lúcia Alves - Maria Lúcia
- Hemílcio Fróes - Jaime
- Denny Perrier - Murilo
- Carlos Gregório - Father Justino
- Ênio Santos - Milton
- Solange Theodoro - Cristina
- Átila Iório - Pedro
- Esther Mellinger - Maria
- Julciléa Telles - Teresa
- Marcos Waimberg - Salvador
- Milton Villar - José
- Ivan de Almeida - Eugêni
- Borges de Barros - Onofre
- Lilian Fernandes - Marli
- Aguinaldo Rocha - Aníbal
- Gilda Sarmento - Carminha
- Ana Maria Sagres - Creusa
- Monique Curi – Paloma (child)
- Maurício M. Quintas - Chico (child)
- Luís Filipe de Lima - Fernando (child)
- João Batista Vieira - Fred (child)
