= Mulheres Apaixonadas =

Brazilian telenovela

- Genre: Telenovela; Family drama; Slice of life
- Created by: Manoel Carlos
- Written by: Manoel Carlos; Maria Carolina; Fausto Galvão; Vinícius Vianna
- Directed by: Marcelo Travesso; Ary Coslov; Ricardo Waddington; Rogério Gomes; José Luiz Villamarim
- Starring: Christiane Torloni; José Mayer; Tony Ramos; Rodrigo Santoro; Camila Pitanga; Helena Ranaldi; Carolina Dieckmann; Paloma Duarte; Lavínia Vlasak; Carolina Kasting; Vanessa Gerbelli; Regiane Alves; Dan Stulbach; Vera Holtz; Marcello Antony; Giulia Gam; Suzana Vieira
- Theme music composer: Vinicius de Moraes
- Opening theme: "Pela Luz dos Olhos Teus" by Tom Jobim & Miúcha
- Composer: Alberto Rosenblit
- Country of origin: Brazil
- Original language: Portuguese
- No. of episodes: 203

Production
- Producer: Flávio Nascimento
- Production locations: Rio de Janeiro, Brazil; Cancún, Quintana Roo, Mexico
- Cinematography: Elton Menezes
- Editors: Carlos Thadeu; Gilson Câmara; William Correia Jr.
- Running time: 29–95 minutes

Original release
- Network: Rede Globo
- Release: 17 February – 10 October 2003

Mulheres Apaixonadas (English: Women In Love) is a Brazilian telenovela which originally aired on Rede Globo from 17 February 2003 to 10 October 2003 with a total of 203 episodes. It was created by Manoel Carlos and written by him with Maria Carolina, Fausto Galvão and Vinícius Vianna, and directed by Marcelo Travesso, Ary Coslov, Ricardo Waddington, Rogério Gomes and José Luiz Villamarim.

It stars Christiane Torloni, José Mayer, Rodrigo Santoro, Camila Pitanga, Tony Ramos, Helena Ranaldi, Carolina Dieckmann, Paloma Duarte, Lavínia Vlasak, Carolina Kasting, Vanessa Gerbelli, Regiane Alves, Dan Stulbach, Vera Holtz, Marcello Antony, Giulia Gam and Suzana Vieira as the main characters, and it has received at least one rerun.

== Plot ==
An enchanting tale of the conflicts assailing Helena, a lovely woman in her forties who must choose between her solid marriage and a flaming passion from the past. This movingly poetic tale portrays life through its female characters, showcasing the secrets and simplicity of love and the difficulties of relationships.

== Cast ==
- Christiane Torloni as Helena Ribeiro Alves
- José Mayer as César
- Tony Ramos as Teófilo Ribeiro Alves (Téo)
- Rodrigo Santoro as Diogo Ribeiro Alves
- Camila Pitanga as Luciana Ribeiro Alves
- Helena Ranaldi as Raquel
- Giulia Gam as Heloísa
- Marcello Antony as Sérgio
- Carolina Dieckmann as Edwiges
- Erik Marmo as Cláudio Moretti
- Susana Vieira as Lorena Ribeiro Alves
- Paloma Duarte as Marina
- Regiane Alves as Dóris de Souza Duarte
- Dan Stulbach as Marcos
- Natália do Vale as Sílvia
- Vanessa Gerbelli as Fernanda
- Vera Holtz as Santana
- Lavínia Vlasak as Estela
- Júlia Almeida as Vidinha
- Maria Padilha as Hilda
- Alinne Moraes as Clara
- Paula Picarelli as Rafaela
- Marcos Caruso as Carlão
- Oswaldo Louzada as Leopoldo Duarte
- Carmem Silva as Flora de Souza Duarte
- Carol Castro as Gracinha
- Leonardo Miggiorin as Rodrigo
- Carolina Kasting as Laura
- Cláudio Marzo as Rafael Nogueira
- Rafael Calomeni as Expedito
- Pedro Furtado as Fred
- Nicola Siri as Padre Pedro
- Regina Braga as Ana
- Umberto Magnani as Argemiro
- Eduardo Lago as Leandro
- Elisa Lucinda as Pérola
- Martha Mellinger as Irene
- Giselle Policarpo as Elisa
- Pitty Webo as Marcinha
- Marly Bueno as Marta Moretti
- Serafim Gonzalez as Onofre Moretti
- Paulo Coronato as Caetano
- Walderez de Barros as Alzira
- Bruna Marquezine as Salete
- Manoelita Lustosa as Inês
- Xuxa Lopes as Leila
- Paulo Figueiredo as Afrânio
- Guilhermina Guinle as Rosinha
- Renata Pitanga as Shirley
- Sônia Guedes as Matilde
- Tião D'Ávila as Oswaldo Arruda
- Victor Cugula as Lucas Ribeiro Alves
- Ana Roberta Gualda as Paula Arruda (Paulinha)
- Daniel Zettel as Carlinhos
- Roberta Rodrigues as Zilda
- Luciele di Camargo as Dirce
- Arlete Heringer as Yvone
- Lica Oliveira as Adelaide
- Joana Medeiros as Eleonora
- Sheila Mattos as Celeste
- Caco Baresi as Orlando
- Fabiana Karla as Célia
- Luciana Rigueira as Odete
- Maria Clara Gueiros as Cecília
- Rodrigo Fauzi as Maurinho
- Rogério Falabella as Dr. Alfredo
- Zé Carlos Machado as Marcelo
- Paulo Ascenção as Maitre
- Laura Lustosa as Margareth
- Tila Teixeira as Tereza
- Laércio de Freitas as Ataulfo
- Diego Gonçalves as Jairo
- Andrea Bassit as Marly
- Eduardo Estrela as Amadeu
- Alessandra Colassanti as Rebeca
- Chaguinha as Ivan
- Priscila Dias as Sônia
- Wilson Cardozo as Jeremias
- Analu Silveira as Monique
- Assayo Horisawa as Chica
- Beta Perez as Simone
- Carol Moonan as Sílvia
- David Herman as Roberto
- Edson Silva as Kleber
- Juliana Didone as Luísa
- Frederico Lessa as Antônio
- Giovana Di Toni as Telma
- Guilherme Caillaux as Reizinho
- Idelcéia Santos as Maria
- Isabela Lobato as Selma
- Luca Bianchi as Alcides
- Jabutu Alegreas Diego
- Marcel Miranda as Washington
- Marcelo Escorel as Nestor
- Marise Gonçalves as Cândida
- Paulo Junior as Tião
- Ronaldo Reis as Robson
- Sandra Hausen as Mirtes
- Sylvio Meanda as Eugênio
- Vera Freitas as Sandra
- Roberto Frota as Lobato
- Reynaldo Gianecchini as Ricardo
- Cris Bonna as Isabel
- Beatriz Lyra as Marta's friend
- Juliana Mesquita as Renatinha
- Igor Cotrim as Romeu

== Reception ==
=== Ratings ===
Timeslot	Episodes	Premiere		Finale		Rank	Season	Average viewership
Timeslot	Episodes	Date	Viewers (in points)	Date	Viewers (in points)	Rank	Season	Average viewership
Mondays—Saturdays; 8:55pm	203	17 February 2003	45	10 October 2003	59	#1	2003	46,6
