= Idolatrada =

1983 Brazilian film by Paulo Augusto Gomes

- Directed by: Paulo Augusto Gomes
- Based on: Paulo Augusto Gomes; Mário Alves Coutinho
- Starring: Denise Bandeira; Mário Lago; Eduardo Machado; Carmen Silva; José Mayer; Maria Lúcia Dahl
- Edited by: Mauro Alice
- Music by: Tavinho Moura
- Distributed by: Embrafilme (Brazil)
- Release date: December 5, 1983 (Brazil)
- Country: Brazil
- Language: Portuguese

Idolatrada (lit. Worshipped) is a 1983 Brazilian drama film directed by Paulo Augusto Gomes with an original screenplay by him and Mario Alves Coutinho. The film stars Denise Bandeira and Carmen Silva. It is known in English as The Loved One.

== Production ==
The film is the directorial debut of Gomes (born 1949), who also had a career as film critic.

Fiming started in Belo Horizonte in 1981.

== Reception ==
A review in Visão found the film sincere and unpretentious but conceded that the lack of experience of the director showed, while Veja described it as "An intimist film about an intellectual in Minais Gerais who remembers his life on the day of his golden wedding anniversary".

=== Accolades ===
Year	Awards	Category	Nominee(s)	Result
1983	Festival de Gramado	Best Film	Idolatrada	Nominated
1983	Festival de Gramado	Special Award from the Jury	Idolatrada	Won
