= Oswaldo Louzada =

Brazilian actor (1912–2008)

- Born: April 12, 1912; Rio de Janeiro, Brazil
- Died: February 22, 2008 (aged 95); Rio de Janeiro, Brazil
- Other names: Louzadinha
- Occupation: Actor
- Notable work: Mulheres Apaixonadas

Oswaldo Louzada (Rio de Janeiro, 12 April 1912 — Rio de Janeiro, 22 February 2008) was a Brazilian actor. He was also known as Louzadinha.

== Biography ==
Louzada was born in Rio de Janeiro on April 12, 1912. He began working on the Radio Panamericana radio drama, under the direction of Oduvaldo Viana in 1944. Louzada also filmed two Brazilian movies in 1944, Gente Honesta and É Proibido Sonhar.

Louzada did not begin working in television until 1971. His telenovela credits included Estúpido Cupido (Stupid Cupid), Locomotivas and Vamp. He also appeared in a number of miniseries, including Engraçadinha, O Primo Basílio and O Tempo e o Vento.

In 2003, Louzada was cast in the popular Brazilian telenovela Mulheres Apaixonadas. He portrayed the elderly character, Leopoldo Duarte, who was married to Flora de Souza Duarte, played by fellow Brazilian actress Carmen Silva. The elderly couple in Mulheres Apaixonadas were often mistreated by their granddaughter, Dóris de Souza Duarte, who was portrayed by actress Regiane Alves. Louzada's role on Mulheres Apaixonadas earned him a good deal of fame throughout the country.

Oswaldo Louzada's last role in television was in the program Sob Nova Direção. Louzada, who was a smoker, suffered from several chronic health problems during his final years, including hypertension, lung cancer and heart problems. He died at the Hospital Copa D'Or in Rio de Janeiro of multiple organ dysfunction syndrome on February 22, 2008, at the age of 95. He had been hospitalized for treatment since February 6, 2008. He was buried at the São João Batista Cemetery in Rio de Janeiro.

Actress Carmen Silva, who played Louzada's television wife on the Mulheres Apaixonadas telenovela, also died of multiple organ dysfunction syndrome, the same disorder which afflicted Louzada, two months later on April 21, 2008.

== Partial filmography ==
- 1944: É Proibido Sonhar
- 1944: Gente Honesta
- 1948: Uma Luz na Estrada
- 1948: Minas Conspiracy
- 1954: É Proibido Beijar
- 1955: Mãos Sangrentas .... Rat
- 1955: Leonora of the Seven Seas
- 1956: Rio Fantasia
- 1957: Rico Ri à Toa
- 1962: O Assalto ao Trem Pagador .... Miguel's tenant
- 1962: Esse Rio Que Eu Amo .... (segment "A Morte da Porta-Estandarte")
- 1963: Gimba, Presidente dos Valentes .... Gabiró
- 1964: Lampião, O Rei do Cangaço
- 1965: Viagem aos Seios de Duília
- 1965: Crônica da Cidade Amada .... (segment "A Morena e o Louro")
- 1970: Uma Garota em Maus Lençóis
- 1971: Bandeira 2 (TV Series) .... Lupa Papa-Defunto
- 1975: Guerra Conjugal .... João Corno
- 1975: Escalada (TV Series) .... Galbino
- 1976: Estúpido Cupido (TV Series) .... Guimarães
- 1977: Locomotivas (TV Series) .... Chico Rico
- 1978: Pecado Rasgado (TV Series) .... Bilu
- 1979: Cabocla (TV Series) .... Felício
- 1981: Brilhante (TV Series) .... Leonel
- 1982: Final Feliz (TV Series) .... Olegário
- 1983: Champagne (TV Series) .... Aristides
- 1985: O Tempo e o Vento (TV Series) .... Florêncio (the old one)
- 1986: Hipertensão (TV Series) .... priest Vicente
- 1988: O Primo Basílio (TV Mini-Series) .... Cunha Rosado
- 1989: Pacto de Sangue (TV Series) .... General Tóti
- 1990: Desejo (TV Mini-Series) .... Erico Coelho
- 1991: Vamp (TV Series) .... priest Eusébio
- 1995: Cara & Coroa (TV Series) .... priest (special guest)
- 1995: Engraçadinha... Seus Amores e Seus Pecados (TV Mini-Series)
- 1996: A Casa de Açúcar
- 2000: Uga-Uga (TV Series) .... Moretti
- 2002: O Quinto dos Infernos (TV Mini-Series) .... Alencastro
- 2003: Mulheres Apaixonadas (TV Series) .... Leopoldo de Sousa Duarte
- 2003: Zorra Total (TV Series)
