= Quem É Você? =

- Genre: Telenovela
- Created by: Solange Castro Neves
- Starring: Elizabeth Savalla; Cássia Kis Magro; Alexandre Borges; Francisco Cuoco; Cecil Thiré; Luíza Tomé; Paulo Gorgulho; Júlia Lemmertz; Eva Todor; Thiago Picchi; Mylla Christie; Eloísa Mafalda; Pedro Brício; Marcelo Serrado; Rita Guedes; Jonas Bloch; Sílvia Bandeira; Helena Fernandes
- Opening theme: "Noite dos Mascarados"
- Composer: Emílio Santiago
- Country of origin: Brazil
- Original language: Portuguese
- No. of episodes: 159

Production
- Running time: 50 minutes

Original release
- Network: TV Globo
- Release: 4 March – 6 September 1996

Quem é Você? is a Brazilian telenovela produced and broadcast by TV Globo from 4 March to 6 September 1996 in 159 chapters (episodes). Substituting História de Amor and substituted by Anjo de Mim, it was the 49th "novela das seis" (seven o'clock novela) aired by the network.

With argument and synopsis of Ivani Ribeiro and Solange Castro Neves, was written by Solange Castro Neves (replaced by Lauro César Muniz, with a collaboration of Isa Duboc, Rosane Lima, Aimar Labaki and Nelson Nadotti. With the direction of Herval Rossano, Flávio Colatrello, Luiz Henrique Rios, direction of production of Carlos Henrique Cerqueira Leite, produced by the nucleus of Herval Rossano.

It counted with Elizabeth Savalla, Alexandre Borges, Cecil Thiré, Luíza Tomé, Marcelo Serrado, Júlia Lemmertz, Jonas Bloch, Rita Guedes, Thiago Picchi, Mylla Christie, Pedro Brício, Francisco Cuoco and Cássia Kis Magro in the main roles.

== Cast ==
Actor	Character
Elizabeth Savalla	Maria Luiza Maldonado Marcondes Aguiar
Cássia Kiss	Beatriz Maldonado
Alexandre Borges	Afonso Marcondes Aguiar
Cecil Thiré	Túlio Cintra
Luíza Tomé	Cíntia Tavares
Francisco Cuoco	Nelson Maldonado
Paulo Gorgulho	Gabriel Siqueira (Álvaro Mariano Filho / Gabriel Rezende)
Júlia Lemmertz	Débora
Eva Todor	Augusta
Eloísa Mafalda	Kitty Salgado
Thiago Picchi	Maurício Thales Maldonado Marcondes Aguiar (Thales/Thaís)
Mylla Christie	Ivana Cintra
Pedro Brício	Carlos Eduardo Maldonado (Cadu)
Marcelo Serrado	Iuri
Rita Guedes	Irina
Jonas Bloch	Sacha
Sílvia Bandeira	Valentina
Helena Fernandes	Nádia
Martha Overbeck	Mariana Marcondes Aguiar
Sandra Barsotti	Tânia
Ruth de Souza	Isolina
Flávio Migliaccio	Jacinto
Fafy Siqueira	Dinha
Cláudio Curi	Rui
Flávio Galvão	Dr. Fábio Meireles
Priscila Camargo	Yolanda Meireles (IoIo)
Paulo César Grande	Rodrigo Tavares
Lídia Mattos	Ernestina (Dona Mimi)
Alberto Pérez	Samuca
Márcia Barros	Ângela
Fernanda Muniz	Márcia Meireles
Vanda Lacerda	Anita Brandão
Eduardo Camargo	Neto
Dirce Migliaccio	Carolina
André Valli	Bartô
Castro Gonzaga	Arquimedes
Cléa Simões	Teresa
Ênio Santos	Ladislau
Lafayette Galvão	Hamilton
Norma Geraldy	Carlota
Carolina Pavanelli	Daniela
