= Alinne Moraes =

Brazilian actress

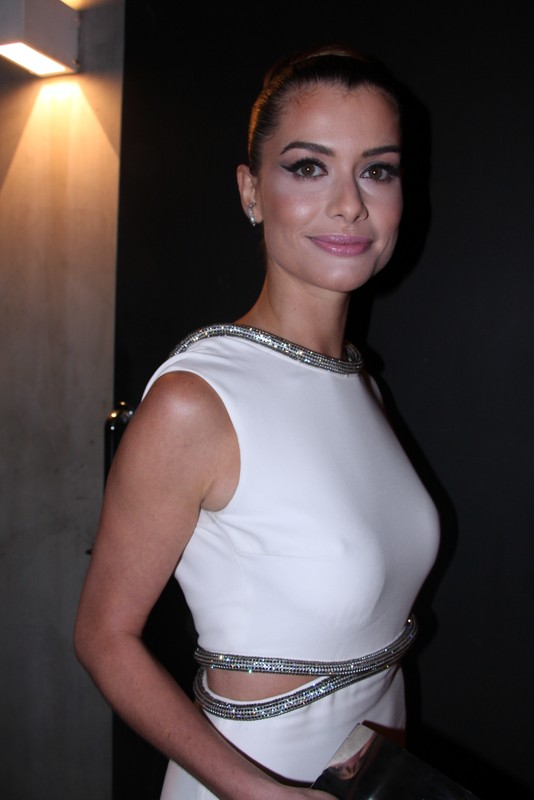
- Moraes in 2015
- Born: 22 December 1982 (age 43); Sorocaba, São Paulo, Brazil
- Occupation: Actress
- Years active: 2002–present
- Spouse: Mauro Lima (2012–2026)
- Partner: Cauã Reymond (2002–2005)
- Children: 1

Jaqueline Cristine Dorelli de Magalhães e Moraes (Portuguese: [aˈlini moˈɾajs]; born 22 December 1982), known professionally as Alinne Moraes, is a Brazilian actress. She is best known by her roles as Maria Sílvia in Duas Caras and as Luciana in Viver a Vida.

== Biography and career ==
Moraes was born in Sorocaba, São Paulo. She is an atheist. Before becoming an actress, she worked as a fashion model, starting at the age of 12 and retiring 6 years later. As a popular actress in Brazil, she was named as one of 100 Sexiest Women in the World 2004 (or As 100 Mulheres Mais Sexy do Mundo 2004 by VIP magazine internet poll. Besides appearing in VIP magazine, she has also appeared in magazines such as Claudia, Nova, UMA, Marie Claire, Trip, Boa Forma and Elle Brasil.

In 2014, Moraes was cast in Em Família but was unable to make it to filming due to her pregnancy, she was later replaced by Tainá Müller.

Her first work as an actress was on the telenovela Coração de Estudante, where she played a young unmarried mother. In 2003, in Mulheres Apaixonadas she played Clara, a gay teenager. In 2004, she starred in the telenovela Da Cor do Pecado, she co-starred as Moa, a brain tumor patient. Between 2004 and 2005 she played her first lead role in Como uma Onda as Nina, a woman whose affections are sought after by two men: her boyfriend, Jorge Junqueira, and Daniel Cascaes, a Portuguese man. In 2006 she starred in the film Fica Comigo Esta Noite which is an adaptation of a Flávio de Souza's play. In the telenovela Bang Bang, she played the role of Penny Lane, a scholar of advanced physics.

Between 2007 and 2008, Moraes played one of her most remarkable characters: the villain psychopath Maria Silvia, in the Rede Globo's primetime telenovela Duas Caras. It was her first villain character for the actress, her character was one of the major factors that boosted the audience of the Aguinaldo Silva's telenovela.

In 2009, she portrayed a prostitute in the film Os Normais 2 – A Noite Mais Maluca de Todas, which was the second film in the series originally starred by Luiz Fernando Guimarães and Fernanda Torres.

Moraes played the former model Luciana Ribeiro in Viver a Vida, a telenovela created and written by Manoel Carlos. Her character was a daughter of Marcos Ribeiro (José Mayer) and Tereza (Lília Cabral). Luciana is a rival of Helena Toledo (Taís Araújo), wife of her father. She suffers a road accident that leaves her tetraplegic thus bringing her career to a halt.

Moraes played Queen Cristina in the 2011 telenovela Cordel Encantado, and in the same year she played Lili in the telenovela O Astro. Moraes played Silvia in the film Heleno.

In 2016, she played Diana, Gui's ex-wife in Rock Story.

== Personal life ==
Between 2002 and 2005 she had a relationship with actor Cauã Reymond. In 2010, she ended her one-year and a half relationship with the bartender and businessman Rodrigo Mendonça.

In 2010, Moraes received the title of citizen emeritus of Sorocaba, in recognition of her work in film, theater and television.

On 8 May 2014, Moraes and her ex-husband Mauro Lima, a Brazilian filmmaker, welcomed their first son, Pedro.

== Filmography ==
=== Television ===
Year	Title	Role	Notes
2002	Os Normais	Gina	Episode: "Uma Experiência Normal"
2002	Coração de Estudante	Rosana Santos	
2003	Mulheres Apaixonadas	Clara Resende	
2004	Da Cor do Pecado	Moa Nascimento Mattar	
2004	Como uma Onda	Mônica Paiva Cascaes "Nina"	
2004	Programa Novo	Secretary	
2005	Bang Bang	Penny McGold Lane	
2007	Duas Caras	Maria Sílvia Barreto Pessoa de Moraes	
2007	Minha Nada Mole Vida	Bel Schettini	
2008	Casos e Acasos	Giane	
2009	Viver a Vida	Luciana Saldanha Ribeiro Machado	
2009	A Turma do Didi	Ela mesma	
2010	As Cariocas	Nádia	
2011	Cordel Encantado	Rainha Cristina Catarina Ávila de Seráfia	
2011	O Astro	Lili (Lilian Paranhos Hayalla)	
2011	Amor em 4 Atos	Vera	
2012	Como Aproveitar o Fim do Mundo	Kátia Maia	
2013	O Dentista Mascarado	Trintona Bonita Tá	
2015	Tim Maia: Vale o que Vier	Janaína	
2015	Mister Brau	Herself	Special participation
2015	Além do Tempo	Lívia Diffiori Castellini/ Lívia Beraldini	
2016	Rock Story	Diana Machado	
2018	Espelho da Vida	Isabel Ferraz/ Isadora "Dora" Teixeira	
2021	Um Lugar ao Sol	Bárbara Assunção Meirelles	
2025	Guerreiros do Sol	Jania	

=== Film ===
Year	Film	Role	Notes
2004	Ódiquê?	Girl at the party	
2006	Casas Brancas	Alinne	Short film
2006	Fica Comigo Esta Noite	Laura	
2009	Os Normais 2	Call girl	
2009	Flordelis: Basta uma Palavra para Mudar	Vanessa dos Santos	
2011	Heleno	Silvia	
2011	O Homem do Futuro	Helena	
2014	Tim Maia	Janaína	
2015	O Vendedor de Passados	Clara	
2016	The Jungle Book	Kaa	Brazilian Portuguese voice-over translation
2017	Os Saltimbancos Trapalhões: Rumo a Hollywood	Tigrana	
2017	João, O Maestro	Carmem Valio	
2017	Oitavo - Filme	The Fatal	Short film
2022	D. P. A. 3 - Uma Aventura no Fim do Mundo	Captain Gertrudes Coral	

=== Internet ===
Year	Title	Role	Notes
2018	Rascunhos Esquecidos de Uma Caixa Sem Saída	Reader	Episode: "Explicações"
2021	Vini conta Branca de Neve	Evil Queen (voice)	

Music Videos

Year	Song	Artist
2021	"Mulher da Minha Vida"	Margareth Menezes

== Stage ==
Year	Play	Role
2007	Dhrama – O Incrível Diálogo entre Krishna e Arjuna	Krishna
2012	Dorotéia	Dorotéia
2019	Relâmpago Cifrado	Doctor B

== Awards and nominations ==
Year	Awards	Category	Nominated work	Result
2003	Melhores do Ano	Best Female Revelation	Clara in Mulheres Apaixonadas	Won
2006	Prêmio Contigo! de TV	Best Co-starring Actress	Penny in Bang Bang	Nominated
2008	Prêmio Extra de Televisão	Best Actress	Sílvia in Duas Caras	Nominated
2008	Prêmio Contigo! de TV	Best Actress	Sílvia in Duas Caras	Nominated
2008	Melhores do Ano	Best Co-starring Actress	Sílvia in Duas Caras	Nominated
2009	Prêmio Faz Diferença – O Globo	Revista da TV	Luciana in Viver a Vida	Won
2009	Melhores do Ano	Best Actress	Luciana in Viver a Vida	Won
2010	Prêmio Contigo! de TV	Best Actress	Luciana in Viver a Vida	Won
2010	Prêmio Tudo de Bom – O Dia	Best Actress	Luciana in Viver a Vida	Won
2010	Prêmio Arte Qualidade Brasil	Best Actress	Luciana in Viver a Vida	Won
2010	Prêmio Minha Novela	Best Actress	Luciana in Viver a Vida	Won
2010	Prêmio Quem de Televisão	Best Actress	Luciana in Viver a Vida	Won
2010	Prêmio Extra de Televisão	Melhor Atriz	Luciana in Viver a Vida	Nominated
2010	Troféu Imprensa	Best Actress	Luciana in Viver a Vida	Nominated
2011	Prêmio Extra de Televisão	Best Actress	Lili in O Astro	Nominated
2015	Prêmio Quem de Televisão	Best Actress	Lívia in Além do Tempo	Pending
2015	Melhores do Ano	Best Actress	Lívia in Além do Tempo	Nominated
2015	O Melhor Da TV	Best Actress	Lívia in Além do Tempo	Nominated
