= Pigmalião 70 =

- Genre: Telenovela
- Created by: Vicente Sesso
- Directed by: Régis Cardoso
- Starring: Sérgio Cardoso; Tônia Carrero; Susana Vieira; Edney Giovenazzi; Wanda Kosmo; Felipe Carone; Norah Fontes; Sérgio Viotti; Carmen Silva
- Country of origin: Brazil
- Original language: Portuguese
- No. of episodes: 204

Production
- Running time: 30 minutes

Original release
- Network: TV Globo
- Release: 2 March – 24 October 1970

Pigmalião 70 is a Brazilian telenovela produced and broadcast by TV Globo. It premiered on 2 March 1970 and ended on 24 October 1970, with a total of 204 episodes. It's the seventh "novela das sete" to be aired at the timeslot. It is created by Vicente Sesso and directed by Régis Cardoso.

== Cast ==
Actor	Character
Sérgio Cardoso	Fernando Dalba (Nando)
Tônia Carrero	Cristina Guimarães
Susana Vieira	Candinha
Edney Giovenazzi	Carlito Catalão
Wanda Kosmo	Baronesa Dalba
Felipe Carone	Gino
Norah Fontes	Guiomar
Célia Biar	Mirtes Catalão
Sérgio Viotti	Conde Fúlvio von Rolambach
Carmen Silva	Condessa Cavanca
Jardel Mello	Alberto
Betty Faria	Sandra
Adriano Reys	Juan Carlos
Maria Luíza Castelli	Lala
Rachel Martins	Carola von Rolambach
Marcos Paulo	Kico Guimarães
Jacyra Silva	Marlene
Herval Rossano	Fábio
Íris Bruzzi	Marilu
Jece Valadão	Oswaldo
Eloísa Mafalda	Ester
Ida Gomes	Júlia
Renato Master	Sérgio
Elizabeth Gasper	Helena Catalão
Luiz Magnelli	Terêncio
Mary Daniel	Irmã Andressa
Álvaro Aguiar	Magalhães
