= Dorinha Duval =

Brazilian actress (1929–2025)

- Born: Dorah Teixeira; 21 January 1929; São Paulo, Brazil
- Died: 21 May 2025 (aged 96)
- Other names: Dorah Maraca; Chininha
- Occupation: Actress
- Years active: 1952–1978
- Spouses: Mário Pomponet Júnior; Daniel Filho; Paulo Sérgio Garcia Alcântara
- Children: 1

Dorinha Duval (21 January 1929 – 21 May 2025) was a Brazilian actress and singer, who after retirement from television and film, became an artist. She became famous for her roles in some of Brazil's most famous television telenovelas and, later, for the murder of her abusive third husband.

== Early life ==
Dorah Teixeira was born in São Paulo, Brazil on 21 January 1929. As a teenager, she joined director Carlos Lisboa's group of dancers, performing at casinos in the interior of São Paulo state. She also sang and played the maracas, earning her the nickname of Dorah Maraca. In this role she appeared in the opening show on Brazilian TV. She also became known as Chininha, apparently from the Chinese appearance of her eyes. Discovered by actors Maria Irma and Juan Daniel, parents of director Daniel Filho, she joined the variety theatre, where she became a successful starlet. Her time in variety was remembered in a 2006 telenovela by Silvio de Abreu, titled Belíssima, in which she made a special appearance.

== Acting career ==
Duval acted in several radio soap operas, before debuting on television. She started at the former TV network Rede Tupi, as part of the cast of the TV de Comédia programme, between 1957 and 1959. She also worked for TV Rio and TV Excelsior. On TV Rio, she was directed by her future husband, Daniel Filho. She started working at TV Globo in 1969, in the cast of the telenovela Verão Vermelho, written by Dias Gomes. In the early 1970s, she was in the cast of three of the most successful telenovelas in Brazilian television drama, all directed by Daniel Filho: Irmãos Coragem (1970), by Janete Clair, Minha Doce Namorada (1970), by Vicente Sesso, and Selva de Pedra (1972), also by Janete Clair. She also participated with Filho in a musical programme that would become famous, known as Times Square. In 1973, she played in the telenovela, O Bem-Amado, the first telenovela broadcast in colour on Brazilian TV. She also played the role of Cuca in Sítio do Picapau Amarelo in 1977, a children's television series first broadcast in 1977. Parallel to her television career, Duval acted in several films. Her first was Veneno (1952), starring Leonora Amar, while the best-known was As Aventuras de Pedro Malasartes in 1960, in which she starred with Amácio Mazzaropi.

== Marriages and murder ==
Duval first married television director Mário Pomponet Júnior. Her second husband was Daniel Filho, with the marriage taking place in Las Vegas. They had a daughter, actress Carla Daniel, in 1965. Her third husband was an advertising producer and filmmaker, Paulo Sérgio Garcia Alcântara, who was unemployed when she met him and for whom she found a job through her contacts. He was 16 years younger than Duval and she was constantly the victim of verbal abuse by him, calling her old and saying that he wanted younger women. In 1980, in a moment of anger, she responded to the insults and humiliations and shot her husband three times in their house in Jardim Botânico, Rio de Janeiro, killing him. For this she was initially sentenced to 18 years in prison, with her husband's family arguing that the crime was premeditated. She was later retried and sentenced to six years in prison, by which time it was almost time for her release.

After release from prison, she decided not to return to acting, preferring to remain out of the limelight. She wrote an autobiography, together with Luiz Carlos Maciel and Maria Luiza Ocampo, which was released in 2002, entitled Em Busca da Luz - Memórias de Dorinha Duval (In search of light – Memories of Dorinha Duval). In this she narrated the experience of being raped at the age of fifteen, having an abortion and prostituting herself. Duval also reveals that she attempted suicide after the separation from Daniel Filho and explains why she killed her third husband. In 2006, she appeared in the final episode of the TV Globo telenovela Belíssima, which paid tribute to some famous stars. In 2018, she returned to television in an event organized with veteran actors. She remained part of Globo's retired team; a group of artists still on contract but no longer working. Among other things, this provides medical insurance.

== Death ==
Duval died on 21 May 2025, at the age of 96.
