= Duas Vidas =

- Genre: Telenovela
- Created by: Janete Clair
- Directed by: Daniel Filho; Gonzaga Blota; Jardel Mello
- Starring: Betty Faria; Francisco Cuoco; Mário Gomes; Susana Vieira; Luis Gustavo; Sadi Cabral; Isabel Ribeiro; Stephan Nercessian; Elza Gomes; Vera Gimenez
- Opening theme: "Deixa" by Bandits of Love
- Country of origin: Brazil
- Original language: Portuguese
- No. of episodes: 154

Production
- Running time: 50 minutes

Original release
- Network: TV Globo
- Release: 13 December 1976 – 13 June 1977

Related
- O Casarão; Espelho Mágico

Duas Vidas is a Brazilian telenovela produced and broadcast by TV Globo. It premiered on 13 December 1976 and ended on 13 June 1977, with a total of 154 episodes. It's the eighteenth "novela das oito" to be aired on the timeslot. It is created and written by Janete Clair and directed by Daniel Filho, Gonzaga Blota and Jardel Mello.

== Plot ==
A street in the Catete neighborhood of Rio de Janeiro is expropriated for the construction of a subway line. From then on, the soap opera follows the story of the residents, the restarting of their lives altered by the city's progress, their family and love relationships.

One of the oldest residents, Grego, Menelau (Sadi Cabral), is a tailor and father of three children: Tomás (Cecil Thiré), Sônia (Isabel Ribeiro) and Oswaldo (Luís Gustavo). After the expropriation, he is forced to live in an apartment with Tomás, his daughter-in-law, Leda Maria (Betty Faria), and his grandson, Téo (Carlos Poyart).

Jealous after an argument with Leda Maria at a carnaval ball, Tomás leaves the ballroom angry and ends up being run over, an accident that causes his death. Leda Maria (Betty Faria) becomes involved simultaneously with Dr. Victor Amadeu (Francisco Cuoco), the son of her friend Rosa (Elza Gomes), an idealistic doctor who provides free care to the local residents, and with Dino César (Mário Gomes), an aspiring singer and the girl's teenage crush. The love triangle gets complicated when Dino gets close to Cláudia (Susana Vieira), also a young widow and daughter of a record company owner. While Dino rises through the ranks of the music industry, Leda struggles to reconcile with her ex-husband's family, raise their son despite the difficulties, and forget her former passion for Dino. In the end, after many disagreements, Leda finds herself in mature love with Victor.

Having failed in his professional endeavor, Dino wants to start life anew and rekindle his engagement with Leda, as if nothing had happened. At the same time, he uses every possible subterfuge to pursue his desired success as a singer. Through a farce, he approaches Cláudia, the director of the record company, and ends up joining her, achieving his goal. But while Cláudia has the power to consecrate Dino César, she can also end his career.

== Cast ==
- Francisco Cuoco - Victor Amadeu
- Betty Faria - Leda Maria
- Susana Vieira - Cláudia
- Luis Gustavo - Oswaldo
- Arlete Salles - Gilda
- Sadi Cabral - Seu Menelau (o Grego)
- Mário Gomes - Dino César
- Ruth de Souza - Elisa
- Flávio Migliaccio - Túlio
- Isabel Ribeiro - Sônia
- Cecil Thiré - Tomás
- Nívea Maria - Hebe
- Neuza Amaral Sarah
- Alberto Perez - Raul Barbosa
- Elza Gomes - Rosa Amadeu
- Stephan Nercessian - Maurício
- Zezé Motta - Jandira
- Milton Moraes - Alexandre
- Vera Gimenez - Zuleika Aguiar
- Moacyr Deriquém - Heitor
- Isolda Cresta - Vera
- Hélio Ary Dário - Sena
- Heloísa Helena - Vírginia
- Jayme Barcellos - Geraldo
- Suzana Faini - Ana Paula
- Cleyde Blota - Roberta
- Dary Reis - Seu Barros
- Ana Ariel - Madame Henriqueta Xavier
- Augusto Olímpio - Edgar Oliveira
- Laura Soveral - Leonor Oliveira
- Diogo Vilela - Sandro
- Myrian Rios - Aparecida (Cidinha)
- Yaçanã Martins - Shirley
- Sérgio Fonta - Renato
- Christiane Torloni - Juliana
- Glória Pires - Letícia

=== Special appearances ===
- Cecil Thiré - Tomás Gusmão
- Alfredo Murphy - Osmário
- Antonio Ganzarolli - Jorge
- Francisco Moreno – Eugênio Matta
- Leda Borba - Francisca
- Luís Vasconcelos - José
- Navarro Puppin – Luis Carlos
- Renata Rayan - Maria
- Samantha Schüller – Sandra
- Sílvio Fróes - Braga
- Vera Paes - Nádia
- Eliano Medeiros - Vilar
