= Susana Vieira =

Brazilian actress (born 1942)

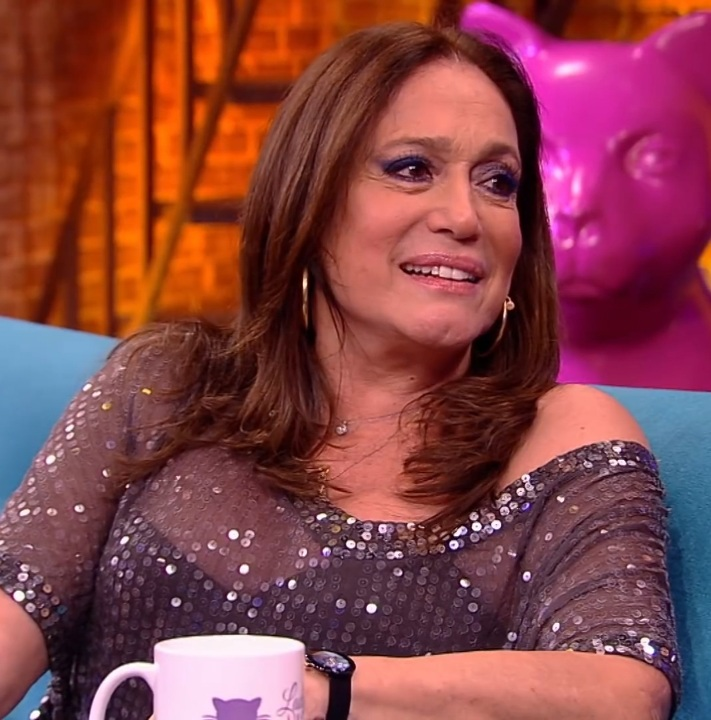
- Susana on Lady Night in 2018
- Born: Sônia Maria Vieira Gonçalves; August 23, 1942 (age 83); São Paulo, Brazil
- Other name: Suzana Vieira
- Occupation: Actress
- Years active: 1962–2023
- Spouses: Régis Cardoso (m. 1961–1972); Carson Gardeazabal (m. 1986–2003); Marcelo Silva (m. 2006–2008)
- Relatives: Sérgio Ricardo Vieira Gonçalves (older brother); Sérvulo Augusto Vieira Gonçalves (older brother); Sandra Vieira Gonçalves (older sister); Susana Gonçalves (younger sister)

Sônia Maria Vieira Gonçalves (born August 23, 1942), better known by her stage name Susana Vieira, is a Brazilian actress.

== Biography and career ==
Susana's father, Marius Gonçalves, was a military man and was a military attaché at the Brazilian embassy in Buenos Aires. Her mother, Maria da Conceição Vieira Gonçalves, worked at the Buenos Aires consulate, which was followed by the marriage and the birth of their children. Susana, baptized as Sônia Maria Vieira Gonçalves, was born in São Paulo Maternity, in the city of São Paulo. The artistic name of Susana is in fact her sister's Christian name, the Argentine actress Susana Gonçalves. In addition to Susana Gonçalves, Susana Vieira has three other brothers: Sérgio Ricardo Vieira Gonçalves, Sérvulo Augusto Vieira Gonçalves and Sandra Vieira Gonçalves. Susana's grandparents were Portuguese.

She graduated in classical ballet, she joined the corps de ballet Grande Teatro Tupi in 1961. Eventually, she debuted as actress in A Noite Eterna, a 1962 telenovela. Since then, Susana has worked in several Rede Globo telenovelas.

She debuted as a singer with the album Brasil Encena, published by Albatroz Music on December 19, 2010. However, she stated that she doesn't intend to start a career as singer.

In April 2024, Vieira released her autobiography, Senhora do Meu Destino, a title inspired by one of Vieira's most successful soap operas, Senhora do Destino, which was televised by O Globo between 2004 and 2005.

== Filmography ==
=== Television ===
Year	Title	Role	Notes
1962	A Única Verdade		
1962	A Noite Eterna	Taís	
1963	Terror nas Trevas		
1966	Ninguém Crê em Mim	Marisa	
1966	As Minas de Prata	Joaninha	
1966	Almas de Pedra	Naná Ramalho	
1966	A Pequena Karen	Karen	
1967	Estrelas no Chão	Sílvia	
1968	Buraco Quente	Suzan	
1968	Amor sem Deus	Ana Beatriz	
1968	A Última Testemunha	Maria Teresa	
1969	Seu Único Pecado	...	
1969	Algemas de Ouro	Tide (Clotilde)	
1970	Pigmalião 70	Candinha	
1970	A Próxima Atração	Regina	
1970	As Bruxas	Diva	
1971	Minha Doce Namorada	Nelita	
1972	O Bofe	Marilene	
1974	O Espigão	Tina Camará	
1975	Escalada	Cândida Ribeiro Dias	
1976	Duas Vidas	Cláudia	
1976	Anjo Mau	Nice Noronha	Lead role
1978	Te Contei?	Lucia	
1978	A Sucessora	Marina Steen	Lead role
1979	Aplauso	Alaíde	Episódio: Vestido de Noiva
1979	Os Gigantes	Veridiana Gurgel	
1981	Baila Comigo	Paula Vargas Leme	
1982	Quem Ama Não Mata	Laura	
1982	Elas por Elas	Vanessa	Special appearance
1983	Profesión: Señora		(Televisa)
1983	Guerra dos Sexos	Marlene	Special appearance
1984	Partido Alto	Gilda	
1985	Ti Ti Ti	Senhora Marcutti	Special appearance
1985	Um Sonho a Mais	Renata	
1986	Cambalacho	Amanda Pereira Guerreiro	
1987	Bambolê	Marta	
1989	Top Model	Bárbara Ellen	Special appearance
1989	O Salvador da Pátria	Gilda Pompeu de Toledo Blanco	
1990	Lua Cheia de Amor	Laís Souto Maia	
1990	Delegacia de Mulheres	Ruth Baiana	2 episodes
1990	Boca do Lixo	Herself	
1992	Anos Rebeldes	Mariana	
1993	Mulheres de Areia	Clarita de Azevedo Assunção	Co-lead role
1993	Fera Ferida	Rubra Rosa Pompílio de Castro	
1995	A Próxima Vítima	Ana Carvalho Mestieri	Lead role
1996	Vira-Lata	Laura	
1996	Salsa e Merengue	Dolores Molidor	Special appearance
1996	Sai de Baixo	Leda Florim	Episode: "Um homem para chamar Dirceu"
1997	Por Amor	Branca Letícia de Barros Mota	Main Antagonist
1998	Você Decide	Jacira Clark	Episode: "Dublê de Socialite"
1999	Chiquinha Gonzaga	Suzette Fontin	
1999	Andando nas Nuvens	Gonçala San Marino	
2000	Você Decide		Episode: "O Morto Vivo"
2000	Sai de Baixo	Rosa	Episode: "O namorado tem namorado"
2000	Você Decide	Carmem	Episode: "A Hipocondríaca"
2001	Sai de Baixo	False Cassandra	Episode: "A Primeira Cassandra a Gente Nunca Esquece"
2001	A Padroeira	Dorothéia Lopes Cintra (Dodô)	
2003	Mulheres Apaixonadas	Lorena Ribeiro Alves	Co-lead role
2004	Senhora do Destino	Maria do Carmo Ferreira da Silva	Lead role
2006	Sob Nova Direção	Madam Zelda	Special appearance
2006	Minha Nada Mole Vida	Herself	Special appearance
2007	Paraíso Tropical	Amélia Viana	Special appearance
2007	Duas Caras	Branca Maria Barreto Pessoa de Morais	Co-lead role
2009	Zorra Total	Joana Kyte, mother to Lady Kate	Special appearance
2009	Cinquentinha	Lara Romero (Aretuza Pena)	Lead role
2010	Laços de Sangue	Lara Romero (Aretuza Pena)	Special appearance
2011	Lara com Z	Lara Romero (Aretuza Pena)	Lead role
2013	Amor à Vida	Pilar Rodriguez Khoury	Co-lead role
2014	Zorra Total	Herself	
2014	Eu Que Amo Tanto	Sandra	
2015	Babilônia	Herself	
2015	Chapa Quente	Herself	
2015	A Regra do Jogo	Adisabeba dos Santos Stewart	
2017	Os Dias Eram Assim	Cora Dumonte	Co-lead role
2019—2020	Éramos Seis	Tia Emília	Antagonist
2023	Terra e Paixão	Cândida Rossini	

=== Film ===
Year	Title	Role	Ref
1974	O Forte		
1975	O Casal		
1983	As Aventuras de Mário Fofoca		
1984	Nunca Fomos tão Felizes	Leonor	
1993	Vênus de Fogo		
2002	Xuxa e os Duendes 2 - No Caminho das Fadas	Bruxa Mor	
2012	Os Penetras	Ivone	
2015	Sorria, Você Esta Sendo Filmado	Vera	
2015	Linda de Morrer	Mother Lina	

== Personal life ==
Susana was married, from 1961 to 1972, to director Régis Cardoso, with whom she had a son called Rodrigo. She married Carson Gardeazabal in 1986, a relationship which ended in 2003. In September 2006, she married Marcelo Silva. However, she divorced him in November 2008 after discovering he had a mistress. In 2009, she got engaged to the magician Sandro Pedroso but they broke up in early 2014. By her own words, in Brazil there's no one as powerful as her and God.

== Awards and nominations ==
Awards
Year	Awards	Category	Nominated work	Result
1975	Prêmio APCA	Best Actress	O Espigão	Won
1976	Prêmio APCA	Best Actress	Escalada	Won
1976	Troféu Imprensa	Best Actress	Rainha da Televisão Brasileira	Won
1997	Prêmio Extra de Televisão	Best Actress	Por Amor	Won
2003	Prêmio Conta Mais	Best Actress	Mulheres Apaixonadas	Won
2003	Troféu Leão de Ouro	Best Actress	Mulheres Apaixonadas	Won
2003	Troféu Imprensa	Best Actress	Mulheres Apaixonadas	Nominated
2004	Melhores do Ano	Best Actress	Senhora do Destino	Won
2004	Prêmio Extra de Televisão	Best Actress	Senhora do Destino	Won
2004	Prêmio Contigo!	Melhor casal	Senhora do Destino	Won
2005	Troféu Imprensa	Best Actress	Senhora do Destino	Nominated
2008	Prêmio Contigo!	Best Actress	Duas Caras	Won
2010	Prêmio Contigo!	Destaque	Whole career	Won
2013	Prêmio Extra de Televisão	Best Actress	Amor à Vida	Nominated
2013	Melhores do Ano	Best Actress	Amor à Vida	Nominated
2014	Troféu Internet de 2014	Best Actress	Amor à Vida	Nominated
2014	Brazilian International Press Awards		Whole Career	Won
2014	ATV		Whole Career	Won
2015	Troféu Mario Lago		Whole Career	Won
