= Minha Doce Namorada =

- Genre: Telenovela
- Created by: Vicente Sesso
- Directed by: Régis Cardoso; Fernando Torres
- Starring: Regina Duarte; Cláudio Marzo; Célia Biar; Sadi Cabral; Maria Cláudia; Mário Lago; Vanda Lacerda
- Opening theme: "Minha Doce Namorada" by Eduardo Conde
- Country of origin: Brazil
- Original language: Portuguese
- No. of episodes: 242

Production
- Running time: 45 minutes

Original release
- Network: TV Globo
- Release: 19 April 1971 – 21 January 1972

Minha Doce Namorada (English: My Sweet Girlfriend) is a Brazilian telenovela produced and broadcast by TV Globo. It premiered on 19 April 1971 and ended on 21 January 1972, with a total of 242 episodes. It's the ninth "novela das sete" to be aired at the timeslot. It is created by Vicente Sesso and directed by Régis Cardoso.

== Cast ==
Actor	Character
Regina Duarte	Patrícia
Cláudio Marzo	Renato Leão
Célia Biar	Tia Miquita
Sadi Cabral	Hipólito Peçanha (Seu Pepê)
Maria Cláudia	Vera (Verinha)
Mário Lago	César Leão
Wanda Lacerda	Sarita Leão
Yara Cortes	Madame Alice Jordão
Juan Daniel	Vinícius Jordão
Elza Gomes	Zélia Peçanha (Zezé)
Paulo Gonçalves	Tibúrcio
Heloísa Helena	Carmem
Jardel Mello	Antônio (Tony)
Dorinha Duval	Maura
Roberto Pirillo	Milton
Patrícia Bueno	Kátia
Paulo Padilha	Dr. Cerqueira
Susana Vieira	Nelita Leão
Marcos Paulo	Raul
Elizabeth Gasper	Marly
Urbano Lóes	Juanito
Renata Fronzi	Marianita
Nélson Caruso	Aristides
Íris Bruzzi	Bárbara (Baby)
Francisco Dantas	Seu José
Norah Fontes	Dona Anita
Carmem Silva	Dona Nina
Nelson Dantas	Seu Érico
Rachel Martins	Dona Virgínia
Ênio Carvalho	Sérgio
Reinaldo Gonzaga	Walter
Suzana Gonçalves	Lúcia
Herivelto Martins Filho	Márcio
