= Tônia Carrero =

Brazilian actress (1922–2018)

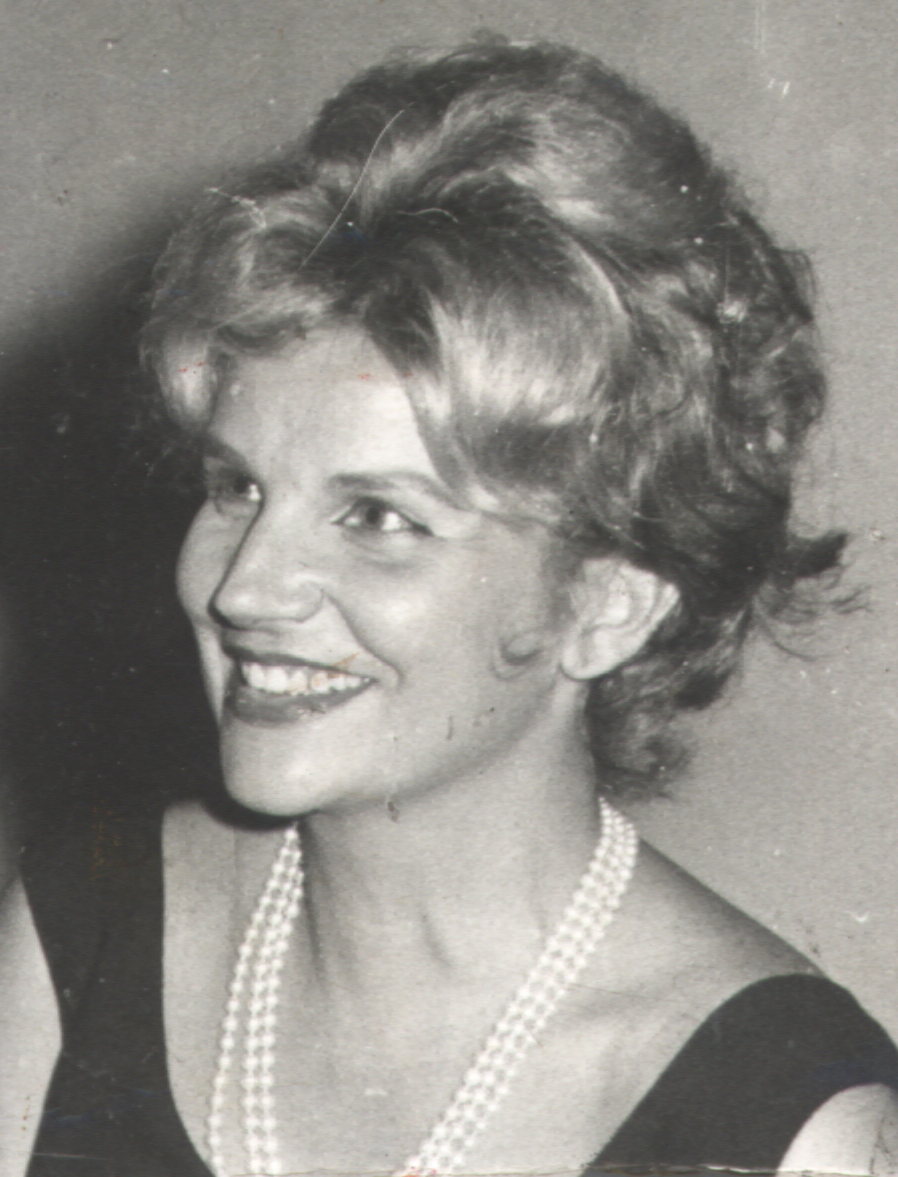
- Carrero in 1966
- Born: Maria Antonieta de Farias Portocarrero; 23 August 1922; Rio de Janeiro, Brazil
- Died: 3 March 2018 (aged 95); Rio de Janeiro, Brazil
- Other name: Maria Antonieta Portocarrero Thedim
- Occupation: Actress
- Years active: 1947–2008
- Spouses: Carlos Arthur Thiré (m. 1940; sep. 1950) Adolfo Celi (m. 1957; div. 1962) César Thedim (m. 1964; div. 1977)
- Children: Cecil Thiré

Maria Antonieta Portocarrero Thedim (née de Farias Portocarrero; 23 August 1922 – 3 March 2018), known professionally as Tônia Carrero, was a Brazilian actress.

== Early life and career ==
Carrero was born and raised in Rio de Janeiro, Brazil.

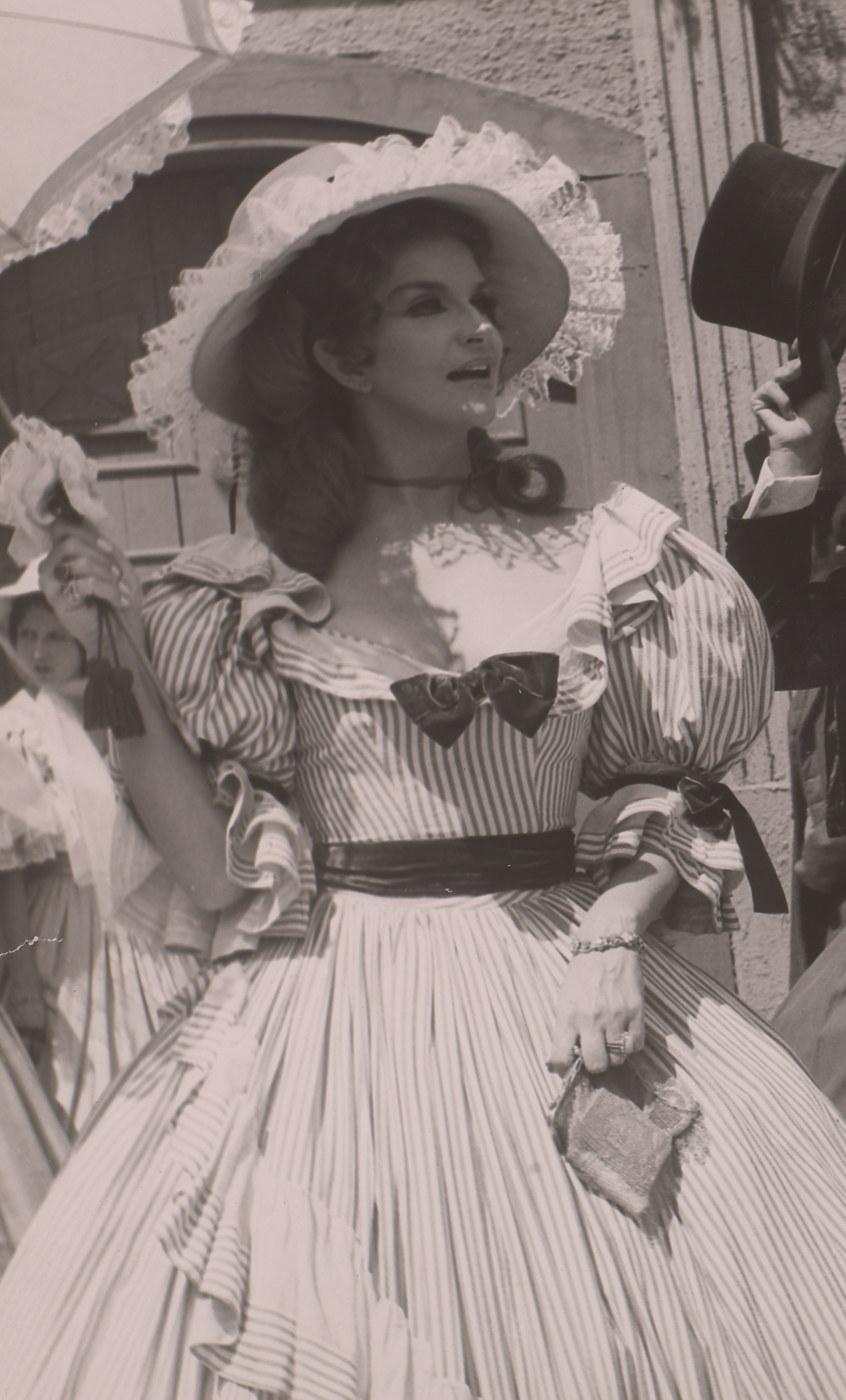
Tônia Carrero in the 1970s

She made her theater debut at the Brazilian Theater of Comedy (TBC) in São Paulo, with the play Um Deus Dormiu Lá em Casa, opposite actor Paulo Autran. Later she formed with her husband Adolfo Celi, and Autran, the Tonia-Celi-Autran Company (CTCA), which in the 1950s and 1960s revolutionized the Brazilian theater scene by performing a wide repertoire from classical pieces by Shakespeare and Carlo Goldoni to avant-garde works such as Sartre.

== Selected filmography ==
- 1952 Tico-Tico no Fubá
- 1961 Alias Gardelito (aka Alias Big Shot) - as wife.
- 1962 Carnival of Crime
- 1962 Copacabana Palace
- 1970 Pigmalião 70
- 1970 A Próxima Atração
- 1971 O Cafona
- 1972 O Primeiro Amor
- 1972 Uma Rosa com Amor
- 1980 Água Viva (TV series) - as Stella Simpson.
- 1983 Louco Amor
- 1987 Sassaricando
- 1989 Kananga do Japão
- 1995 Sangue do Meu Sangue
- 2004 Um Só Coração
- 2004 Senhora do Destino
- 2007 The Ballroom
