= Carmen Silva =

Brazilian actress (1916–2008)

- Born: Maria Amália Feijó; April 5, 1916; Pelotas, Rio Grande do Sul, Brazil
- Died: April 21, 2008 (aged 92); Porto Alegre, Rio Grande do Sul, Brazil
- Other name: Carmem Silva
- Occupation: Actress

Carmen Silva (April 5, 1916 – April 21, 2008), who was often credited as Carmem Silva, was a Brazilian television, stage and film actress. She was best known in recent years for her role on the Brazilian telenovela, Mulheres Apaixonadas in which she played Flora de Souza Duarte, the wife of Leopoldo Duarte (Oswaldo Louzada). Mulheres Apaixonadas was created by Manoel Carlos.

== Biography ==
Silva was born Maria Amália Feijó in Pelotas, Rio Grande do Sul, Brazil on April 5, 1916. Her acting career only began in earnest in 1939 when she took a job at Rádio Cultura in Pelotas. She worked at the station, as well as others, in various capacities, until she moved to São Paulo, where she joined Radio Tupi. She also worked on Rádio Record with Janete Clair. The two wrote programs aimed at a female audience.

Silva's career switched to the newly popular medium of television during the 1950s. She began acting in soap operas and telenovelas during the decade, including A Próxima Atração, Ossos do Barão, Sinal de Alerta, as well as the miniseries O Primo Basílio. She also founded her own theater company in Rio Grande do Sul during the 1960s.

Silva hit a career highlight when she joined the popular Brazilian telenovela Mulheres Apaixonadas in 2003. She played an elderly character, Flora de Souza Duarte, while Brazilian actor Oswaldo Louzada portrayed her husband, Leopoldo Duarte, on the soap opera. Their characters often suffered ill treatment at the hands of their granddaughter, Dóris, who was played by actress Regiane Alves.

Carmen Silva last acting role was the in 2007 film, Valsa para Bruno Stein (Waltz for Bruno Stein), which was shown at the 2007 Festival de Gramado film festival.

Carmen Silva died of multiple organ dysfunction syndrome at the Hospital Mãe de Deus in age of 92 in Porto Alegre, Brazil, on April 21, 2008. She had been hospitalized since April 1, 2008, for treatment of her illness. Silva was buried at the Irmandade Arcanjo São Miguel e Almas cemetery in Porto Alegre.

Sadly, Oswaldo Louzada, who played her television husband on Mulheres Apaixonadas, also died from multiple organ dysfunction syndrome, the same disease that afflicted Silva on February 22, 2008.

== Filmography ==
=== Film ===
- 1946: El Ángel desnudo
- 1949: Quase no Céu
- 1955: Carnaval em Lá Maior - Mulher de chapéu
- 1957: Rebelião em Vila Rica
- 1958: O Grande Momento
- 1970: Elas - (segment "O Artesanato de Ser Mulher")
- 1974: The Hand That Feeds the Dead
- 1974: Guerra Conjugal - Amália
- 1977: Contos Eróticos - Tia Cotinha (segment "As Três Virgens")
- 1982: Amor de Perversão
- 1983: Idolatrada
- 1990: O Gato de Botas Extraterrestre
- 1997: Até Logo, Mamãe (Short)
- 2002: Lembra, Meu Velho? (Short) - Dora
- 2003: A Festa de Margarette
- 2005: Café da Tarde (TV Short) - Iara
- 2007: Valsa para Bruno Stein - (final film role)

=== Television ===
- 1958: Cela da Morte
- 1970: Pigmalião 70 - Condessa Cavanca
- 1970: A Próxima Atração - Dona Saudade
- 1971: Minha Doce Namorada - Dona Nina
- 1972: Signo da Esperança (TV Tupi) - Lindolfa
- 1972: Bel-Ami (TV Tupi) - Gertrudes
- 1972: Quero Viver (Rede Record) - Carmela
- 1973: Vendaval (Rede Record)
- 1973: Vidas Marcadas (Rede Record)
- 1973: Venha Ver o Sol na Estrada (Rede Record) - Vovó Tonica
- 1973-1974: Os Ossos do Barão - Melica
- 1974-1975: Ídolo de Pano (TV Tupi) - Pauline de Clermon
- 1975: A Viagem (TV Tupi) - Dona Isaura
- 1977: Locomotivas - Adelaide
- 1978: Sinal de Alerta - Coló
- 1979: Cara a Cara (Rede Bandeirantes) - Milú
- 1980: Pé de Vento (Rede Bandeirantes) - Noca
- 1981: Baila Comigo
- 1981: Os Adolescentes (Rede Bandeirantes)
- 1982: Ninho da Serpente (Rede Bandeirantes) - Maria Clara
- 1982: Campeão (Rede Bandeirantes) - Joana
- 1983: Sabor de Mel (Rede Bandeirantes) - Jojô
- 1984: Meus Filhos, Minha Vida (SBT) - Ana
- 1988: O Primo Basílio (miniseries) - Dona Virgínia Lemos
- 2003: Mulheres Apaixonadas - Flora de Sousa Duarte
- 2003: Zorra Total - Flora de Sousa Duarte
- 2006: A Diarista (seriado - episódios Aquele da Chuva e Marinete Não Chega!) - Dona Gilda
