= César Ladeira =

Brazilian journalist (1910–1969)

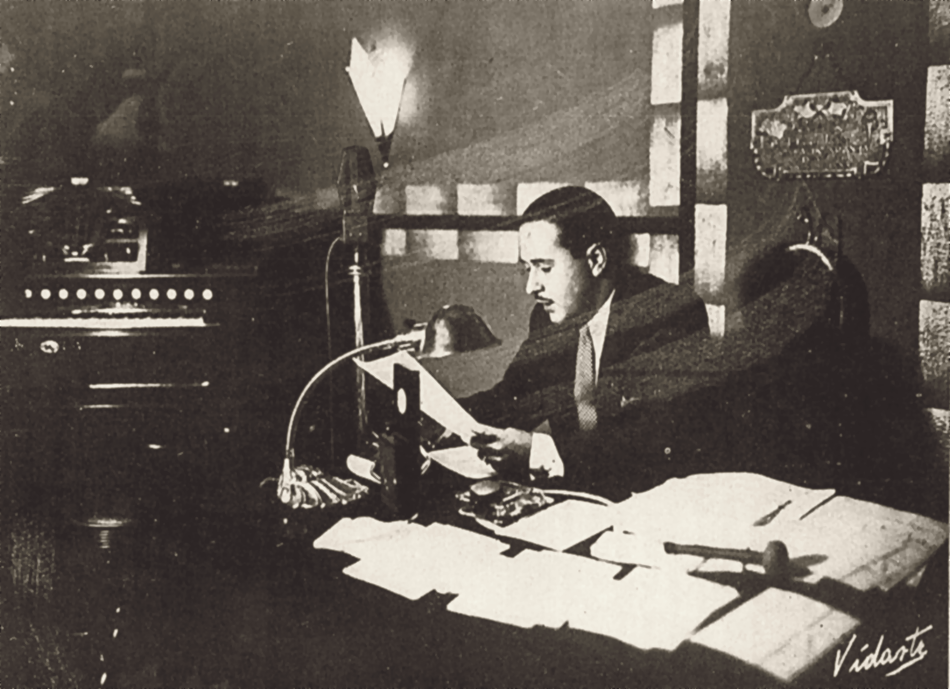
- Ladeira in 1937.
- Born: César Rocha Brito Ladeira; December 11, 1910; Campinas, São Paulo, Brazil
- Died: September 8, 1969 (aged 58)
- Spouse: Renata Fronzi

César Rocha Brito Ladeira, known as Cesar Ladeira (11 December 1910 — 8 September 1969) was a Brazilian journalist.

Ladeira was one of the most famous radio hosts in Brazil.
