= Teatro Miguel Falabella =

Teatro Miguel Falabella is a theatre in Rio de Janeiro, Brazil. It was inaugurated on 21 August 1997.
