= O Cafona =

- Genre: Telenovela
- Created by: Bráulio Pedroso
- Directed by: Daniel Filho; Walter Campos
- Starring: Francisco Cuoco; Marília Pêra; Tônia Carrero; Paulo Gracindo; Renata Sorrah; Álvaro Aguiar
- Opening theme: "O Cafona" - Paulo Sérgio Valle and Ângela Valle
- Country of origin: Brazil
- Original language: Portuguese
- No. of episodes: 183

Original release
- Network: TV Globo
- Release: March 24 – October 20, 1971

Related
- Assim na Terra como no Céu; Bandeira 2

O Cafona is a 1971 Brazilian telenovela created by Bráulio Pedroso, starring Francisco Cuoco and Marília Pêra in the main roles.

== Plot ==
The main plot revolves around Gilberto Athayde, known as Gigi, a simple and rude widower who has become a nouveau riche thanks to the growth of his supermarket chain. He lives with his daughter, the rebellious Dalva, who is in love with an older man: the aspiring model Pietro, heir to a bankrupt family, and dreams of being accepted by Rio's high society by marrying a socialite.

Gigi has two possible marriages: Malu, the daughter of Fred Bastos, a bankrupt millionaire who wants to end his financial problems through his daughter's profitable marriage. Fred is married to the sophisticated and thoughtful Heloísa, Malu's mother, but is having an extramarital affair with Vera, the beautiful and seductive editor of a New York magazine; and Beatriz, the ex-wife of the miserly businessman Gastão Monteiro, with whom he is at loggerheads and who only cares about posing for magazine covers as one of the most elegant women in the social columns. Bridging the two worlds is secretary Shirley Sexy, who dreams of being an actress and is madly in love with her boss Gigi.

There is also the story of Cacá, Gastão's son from his first marriage, Júlio and Rogério, three young men who want to make the most radical movie in Brazilian cinema: Matou o Marido e Prevaricou o Cadáver. They have the help of the young writer Lúcia Esparadrapo and the Prophet, a guru from the beaches of Rio de Janeiro, secretly in love with the sweet and shy widow Roseli. They all live in a hippie community in the Santa Teresa district, where Shirley Sexy also lives, invited by the trio to star in the film.

== Cast ==
Actor	Character
Francisco Cuoco	Gilberto Athayde do Espírito Santo (Gigi)
Marília Pêra	Shirley Sexy
Tônia Carrero	Beatriz Monteiro
Paulo Gracindo	Frederico da Silva Bastos (Fred)
Renata Sorrah	Maria Luíza da Silva Bastos (Malu)
Álvaro Aguiar	Gastão Monteiro
Ilka Soares	Vera
Ary Fontoura	Profeta
Gracinda Freire	Heloísa da Silva Bastos
Felipe Carone	Jairton Saca-Rolhas
Irma Alvarez	Roseli
Osmar Prado	Carlos Monteiro (Cacá)
Marco Nanini	Júlio
Carlos Vereza	Rogério
Djenane Machado	Lúcia Esparadrapo
Elizângela	Dalva do Espírito Santo
Juan de Bourbon	Pietro
Suzy Kirbi	Amélia da Silva Bastos
Moacyr Deriquém	Eugênio Siqueira
Roberto Bonfim	Lazão
Vera Manhães	Neusa
André Valli	Godofredo
Sônia Dutra	Viviana (Vivi)
Gésio Amadeu	Amadeu
Angelito Mello	Marcelo
