= Lady Francisco =

Brazilian actress and director (1935–2019)

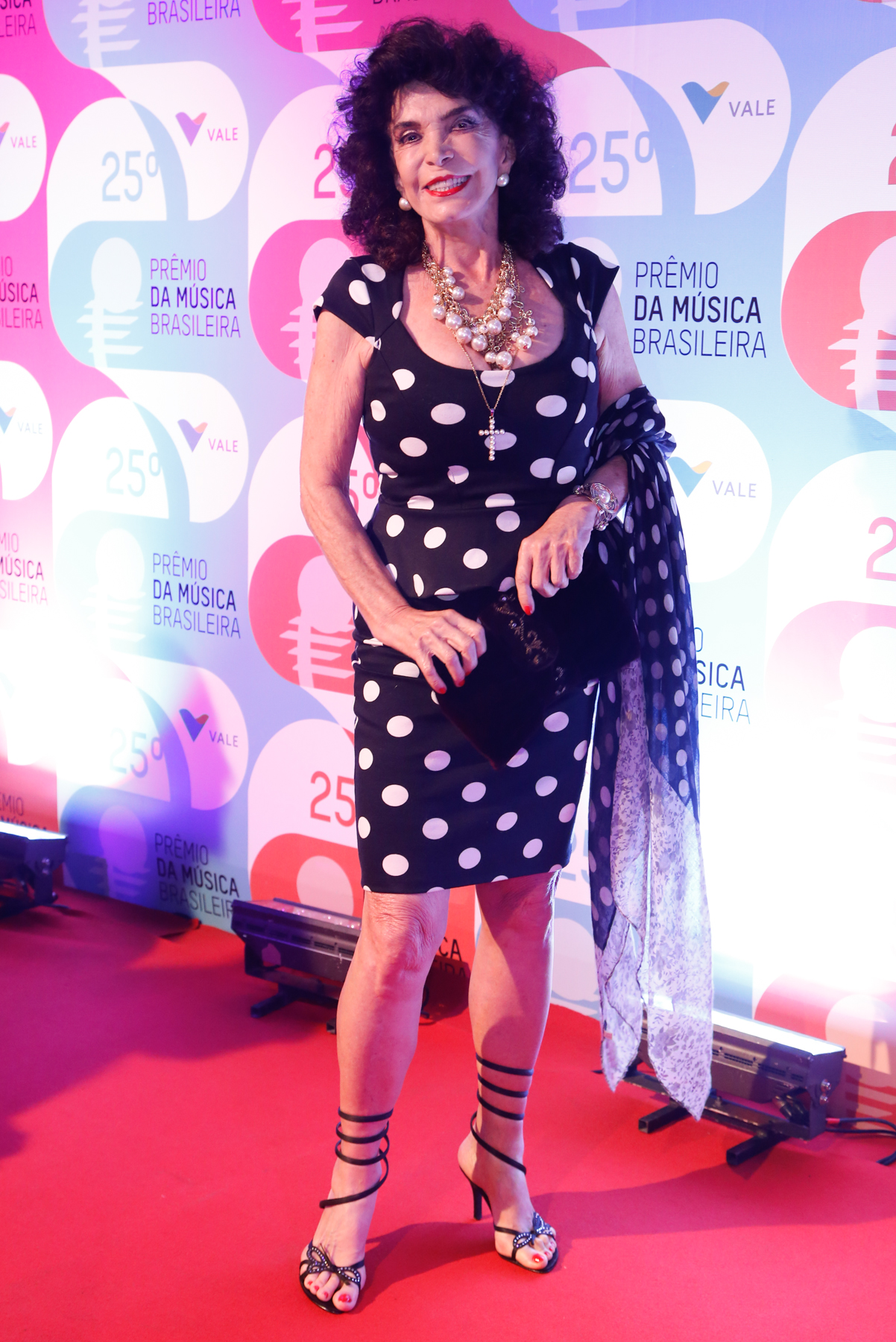
- Born: January 7, 1935; Belo Horizonte, Brazil
- Died: May 25, 2019 (aged 84); Rio de Janeiro, Brazil
- Occupation: Actor
- Children: Oscar Francisco

Lady Chuquer Volla Borelli de Bourbon (January 7, 1935 – May 25, 2019), also known as Lady Francisco, was a Brazilian actress and director. She appeared in 25 films and several TV soaps.

== Life ==
Born in Belo Horizonte, to a father of Spanish, Italian, and Syrian descent. She appeared in the TV soap opera Sin Capital in 1975 and Carla Lambrini in Locomotivas in 1977.

She returned to the genre to appear in Explodes Heart in 1995, For Love in 1998 and Full of Charm in 2012. Her best remembered role was said to be Bellies for Hire in 1990, where she played a geneticist named Yara. She appeared in 25 films. In 1981, she co-directed the film Angels of Sex with Levy Salgado.

Francisco died in Rio de Janeiro in 2019, aged 84, during hospital treatment for complications after the repair of a broken femur.
