= Silvio de Abreu =

Actor, director, Brazilian screenwriter (born 1942)

- Born: 20 December 1942; São Paulo, São Paulo, Brazil
- Occupations: Actor, author, director and screenwriter
- Employer(s): TV Globo (1970s-2020); HBO Max (2020-present)

Silvio Eduardo de Abreu (born 20 December 1942) is a Brazilian actor, director, and screenwriter. He is currently the director of the dramaturgy department of Rede Globo.

He became famous for adopting the police-procedural style in his works and setting them in the city of São Paulo, where he lives. Among his most renowned works are the telenovelas Guerra dos Sexos, Cambalacho, Sassaricando, Rainha da Sucata, Deus Nos Acuda, A Próxima Vítima, Torre de Babel, Belíssima, and Passione. He was responsible for establishing the 7 p.m. time slot as a home for telenovelas centered on humor and urban life—a trend TV Globo continues to follow for that slot to this day. He also served as the channel's first Director of Drama.

After leaving TV Globo, he was hired as a Telenovela Supervisor for HBO Max.
