= List of TV Globo telenovelas =

TV Globo (formerly Rede Globo) is a Brazilian free-to-air television network owned and operated by the media conglomerate Grupo Globo (formerly known as Organizações Globo). It was founded on April 26, 1965 by Brazilian journalist Roberto Marinho (1904–2003). Ilusões Perdidas was the first telenovela produced by the network.

Indicates the winner of the Troféu Imprensa for Best Telenovela.

== 1960s ==
Title	Ep.	Author	First aired	Last aired	Ref.
1965
Ilusões Perdidas	56	Enia Petri	26 April 1965	30 July 1965	
Rosinha do Sobrado	50	Moysés Weltman	3 August 1965	22 October 1965	
Marina	15	Leonardo de Castro	23 August 1965	10 September 1965	
Paixão de Outono	50	Glória Magadan	14 September 1965	1 December 1965	
A Moreninha	35	Otávio Graça Mello	25 October 1965	10 December 1965	
O Ébrio	75	José Castellar & Heloísa Castellar	8 November 1965	18 February 1966	
Um Rosto de Mulher	85	Daniel Más	3 December 1965	13 March 1966	
Padre Tião	50	Moysés Weltman	12 December 1965	17 February 1966	
1966
Eu Compro Esta Mulher	85	Glória Magadan	14 March 1966	15 July 1966	
O Sheik de Agadir	155	Glória Magadan	18 July 1966	17 February 1967	
O Rei dos Ciganos	120	Moysés Weltman	12 September 1966	20 February 1967	
1967
A Rainha Louca	215	Moysés Weltman	20 February 1967	16 December 1967	
A Sombra de Rebecca	90	Glória Magadan	21 February 1967	23 June 1967	
Anastácia, a Mulher sem Destino	125	Emiliano Queiroz	28 June 1967	16 December 1967	
Sangue e Areia	135	Janete Clair	18 December 1967	25 June 1968	
O Homem Proibido	135	Glória Magadan	18 December 1967	25 June 1968	
1968
O Santo Mestiço	80	Glória Magadan	12 February 1968	7 June 1968	
A Grande Mentira	341	Hedy Maia	10 June 1968	5 July 1969	
Passo dos Ventos	177	Janete Clair	26 June 1968	14 January 1969	
A Gata de Vison	169	Glória Magadan	26 June 1968	6 January 1969	
1969
A Última Valsa	103	Glória Magadan	7 January 1969	5 June 1969	
Rosa Rebelde	212	Janete Clair	15 January 1969	13 October 1969	
A Ponte dos Suspiros	144	Dias Gomes	6 June 1969	15 November 1969	
A Cabana do Pai Tomás	204	Hedy Maia	7 July 1969	28 February 1970	
Véu de Noiva	221	Janete Clair	10 November 1969	6 June 1970	
Verão Vermelho	209	Dias Gomes	17 November 1969	17 July 1970	

== 1970s ==
=== 1970 ===
Title	Ep.	Author	First aired	Last aired	Ref.
Pigmalião 70	204	Vicente Sesso	2 March 1970	24 October 1970	
Irmãos Coragem	328	Janete Clair	8 June 1970	12 June 1971	
Assim na Terra como no Céu	212	Dias Gomes	20 July 1970	23 March 1971	
A Próxima Atração	150	Walther Negrão	26 October 1970	17 April 1971	

=== 1971 ===
Title	Ep.	Author	First aired	Last aired	Ref.
O Cafona	183	Bráulio Pedroso	24 March 1971	20 October 1971	
Minha Doce Namorada	242	Vicente Sesso	19 April 1971	21 January 1972	
O Homem Que Deve Morrer	258	Janete Clair	14 June 1971	8 April 1972	
Meu Pedacinho de Chão	185	Benedito Ruy Barbosa	16 August 1971	6 May 1972	
Bandeira 2	179	Dias Gomes	1 October 1971	15 July 1972	

=== 1972 ===
Title	Ep.	Author	First aired	Last aired	Ref.
O Primeiro Amor	228	Walther Negrão	24 January 1972	20 October 1972	
Selva de Pedra	243	Janete Clair	10 April 1972	23 January 1973	
Bicho do Mato	141	Chico de Assis & Renato Corrêa de Castro	8 May 1972	17 November 1972	
O Bofe	143	Bráulio Pedroso	17 July 1972	23 January 1973	
Uma Rosa com Amor	221	Vicente Sesso	23 October 1972	30 June 1973	
A Patota	101	Maria Clara Machado	27 November 1972	29 March 1973	

=== 1973 ===
Title	Ep.	Author	First aired	Last aired	Ref.
Cavalo de Aço	179	Walther Negrão	24 January 1973	18 August 1973	
O Bem-Amado	178	Dias Gomes	22 January 1973	3 October 1973	
Carinhoso	174	Lauro César Muniz	2 July 1973	19 January 1974	
O Semideus	221	Janete Clair	20 August 1973	7 May 1974	
Os Ossos do Barão	120	Jorge Andrade	8 October 1973	31 March 1974	

=== 1974 ===
Title	Ep.	Author	First aired	Last aired	Ref.
Supermanoela	138	Walther Negrão	21 January 1974	6 July 1974	
O Espigão	112	Dias Gomes	3 April 1974	1 November 1974	
Fogo sobre Terra	209	Janete Clair	8 May 1974	4 January 1975	
Corrida do Ouro	178	Lauro César Muniz & Gilberto Braga	8 July 1974	24 January 1975	
O Rebu	112	Bráulio Pedroso	4 November 1974	11 April 1975	

=== 1975 ===
Title	Ep.	Author	First aired	Last aired	Ref.
Escalada	199	Lauro César Muniz	6 January 1975	23 August 1975	
Cuca Legal	119	Marcos Rey	27 January 1975	13 June 1975	
Gabriela	135	Jorge Amado	14 April 1975	24 October 1975	
Helena	20	Gilberto Braga	5 May 1975	30 May 1975	
O Noviço	20	Mário Lago	2 June 1975	27 June 1975	
Bravo!	198	Janete Clair and Gilberto Braga	16 June 1975	30 January 1976	
Senhora	80	Gilberto Braga	30 June 1975	17 October 1975	
Pecado Capital	167	Janete Clair	24 November 1975	4 June 1976	
A Moreninha	79	Marcos Rey	20 October 1975	2 February 1976	
O Grito	125	Jorge Andrade	27 October 1975	30 April 1976	

=== 1976 ===
Title	Ep.	Author	First aired	Last aired	Ref.
Anjo Mau	175	Cassiano Gabus Mendes	2 February 1976	24 August 1976	
Vejo a Lua no Céu	119	Sylvan Paezzo	9 February 1976	25 June 1976	
Saramandaia	160	Dias Gomes	3 May 1976	31 December 1976	
O Casarão	168	Lauro César Muniz	17 June 1976	10 December 1976	
O Feijão e o Sonho	87	Benedito Ruy Barbosa	28 June 1976	9 October 1976	
Estúpido Cupido	160	Mário Prata	25 August 1976	26 February 1977	
Escrava Isaura	100	Gilberto Braga	11 October 1976	5 February 1977	
Duas Vidas	154	Janete Clair	13 December 1976	13 June 1977	

=== 1977 ===
Title	Ep.	Author	First aired	Last aired	Ref.
À Sombra dos Laranjais	91	Benedito Ruy Barbosa & Sylvan Paezzo	7 February 1977	23 May 1977	
Locomotivas	168	Cassiano Gabus Mendes	1 March 1977	12 September 1977	
Dona Xepa	132	Gilberto Braga	24 May 1977	24 October 1977	
Espelho Mágico	150	Lauro César Muniz	14 June 1977	5 December 1977	
Nina	142	Walter George Durst	27 June 1997	13 January 1978	
Sem Lenço, Sem Documento	149	Mário Prata	13 September 1977	4 March 1978	
Sinhazinha Flô	82	Lafayette Galvão	25 October 1977	27 January 1978	
O Astro	186	Janete Clair	6 December 1977	7 July 1978	

=== 1978 ===
Title	Ep.	Author	First aired	Last aired	Ref.
O Pulo do Gato	140	Bráulio Pedroso	16 January 1978	28 July 1978	
Maria, Maria	125	Manoel Carlos	30 January 1978	23 June 1978	
Te Contei?	151	Cassiano Gabus Mendes	6 March 1978	2 September 1978	
Dancin' Days	174	Gilberto Braga	10 July 1978	27 January 1979	
Gina	89	Rubens Ewald Filho	26 June 1978	6 October 1978	
Sinal de Alerta	112	Dias Gomes	31 July 1978	26 January 1979	
Pecado Rasgado	169	Silvio de Abreu	4 September 1978	16 March 1979	
A Sucessora	125	Manoel Carlos	9 October 1978	2 March 1979	

=== 1979 ===
Title	Ep.	Author	First aired	Last aired	Ref.
Pai Herói	178	Janete Clair	29 January 1979	18 August 1979	
Memórias de Amor	79	Wilson Aguiar Filho	5 March 1979	1 June 1979	
Feijão Maravilha	124	Bráulio Pedroso	19 March 1979	4 August 1979	
Cabocla	167	Benedito Ruy Barbosa	4 June 1979	14 December 1979	
Marron Glacê	181	Cassiano Gabus Mendes	6 August 1979	1 March 1980	
Os Gigantes	147	Lauro César Muniz	20 August 1979	2 February 1980	

== 1980s ==
=== 1980 ===
Title	Ep.	Author	First aired	Last aired	Ref.
Olhai os Lírios do Campo	114	Geraldo Vietri	21 January 1980	24 May 1980	
Água Viva	159	Gilberto Braga	4 February 1980	9 August 1980	
Chega Mais	158	Carlos Eduardo Novaes	3 March 1980	6 September 1980	
Marina	137	Wilson Aguiar Filho	26 May 1980	8 November 1980	
Coração Alado	185	Janete Clair	11 August 1980	14 March 1981	
Plumas e Paetês	197	Cassiano Gabus Mendes	8 September 1980	25 April 1981	
As Três Marias	156	Walther Negrão	10 November 1980	16 May 1981	

=== 1981 ===
Title	Ep.	Author	First aired	Last aired	Ref.
Baila Comigo	167	Manoel Carlos	16 March 1981	26 September 1981	
O Amor É Nosso	155	Roberto Freire & Wilson Aguiar Filho	27 April 1981	24 October 1981	
Ciranda de Pedra	155	Teixeira Filho	18 May 1981	14 November 1981	
Brilhante	155	Gilberto Braga	28 September 1981	26 March 1982	
Jogo da Vida	167	Silvio de Abreu	26 October 1981	8 May 1982	
Terras do Sem-Fim	89	Walter George Durst	16 November 1981	26 February 1982	

=== 1982 ===
Title	Ep.	Author	First aired	Last aired	Ref.
O Homem Proibido	146	Teixeira Filho	1 March 1982	21 August 1982	
Sétimo Sentido	166	Janete Clair	29 March 1982	9 October 1982	
Elas por Elas	173	Cassiano Gabus Mendes	10 May 1982	27 November 1982	
Paraíso	195	Benedito Ruy Barbosa	23 August 1982	26 March 1983	
Sol de Verão	137	Manoel Carlos	11 October 1982	19 March 1983	
Final Feliz	161	Ivani Ribeiro	29 November 1982	3 June 1983	

=== 1983 ===
Title	Ep.	Author	First aired	Last aired	Ref.
Pão Pão, Beijo Beijo	165	Walther Negrão	28 March 1983	7 October 1983	
Louco Amor	167	Gilberto Braga	11 April 1983	22 October 1983	
Guerra dos Sexos	185	Silvio de Abreu	6 June 1983	7 January 1984	
Eu Prometo	110	Janete Clair	19 September 1983	17 February 1984	
Voltei pra Você	140	Benedito Ruy Barbosa	10 October 1983	16 March 1984	
Champagne	167	Cassiano Gabus Mendes	24 October 1983	4 May 1984	

=== 1984 ===
Title	Ep.	Author	First aired	Last aired	Ref.
Transas e Caretas	167	Lauro César Muniz	9 January 1984	21 July 1984	
Amor com Amor Se Paga	155	Ivani Ribeiro	19 March 1984	14 September 1984	
Partido Alto	174	Aguinaldo Silva & Glória Perez	7 May 1984	23 November 1984	
Vereda Tropical	167	Carlos Lombardi	23 July 1984	2 February 1985	
Livre para Voar	184	Walther Negrão	17 September 1984	12 April 1985	
Corpo a Corpo	179	Gilberto Braga	26 November 1984	21 June 1985	

=== 1985 ===
Title	Ep.	Author	First aired	Last aired	Ref.
Um Sonho a Mais	153	Daniel Más	4 February 1985	3 August 1985	
A Gata Comeu	160	Ivani Ribeiro	15 April 1985	19 October 1985	
Roque Santeiro	209	Dias Gomes	24 June 1985	22 February 1986	
Ti Ti Ti	185	Cassiano Gabus Mendes	5 August 1985	8 March 1986	
De Quina pra Lua	164	Alcides Nogueira	21 October 1985	25 April 1986	

=== 1986 ===
Title	Ep.	Author	First aired	Last aired	Ref.
Selva de Pedra	155	Regina Braga & Eloy Araújo	24 February 1986	23 August 1986	
Cambalacho	173	Silvio de Abreu	10 March 1986	4 October 1986	
Sinhá Moça	172	Benedito Ruy Barbosa	28 April 1986	14 November 1986	
Roda de Fogo	179	Lauro César Muniz	25 August 1986	21 March 1987	
Hipertensão	167	Ivani Ribeiro	6 October 1986	18 April 1987	

=== 1987 ===
Title	Ep.	Author	First aired	Last aired	Ref.
Direito de Amar	172	Walther Negrão	16 February 1987	4 September 1987	
O Outro	173	Aguinaldo Silva	23 March 1987	10 October 1987	
Brega e Chique	173	Cassiano Gabus Mendes	20 April 1987	7 November 1987	
Bambolê	172	Daniel Más	7 September 1987	25 March 1988	
Mandala	185	Dias Gomes	12 October 1987	14 May 1988	
Sassaricando	184	Silvio de Abreu	9 November 1987	11 June 1988	

=== 1988 ===
Title	Ep.	Author	First aired	Last aired	Ref.
Fera Radical	203	Walther Negrão	28 March 1988	18 November 1988	
Vale Tudo	204	Gilberto Braga, Aguinaldo Silva & Leonor Bassères	16 May 1988	6 January 1989	
Bebê a Bordo	209	Carlos Lombardi	13 June 1988	11 February 1989	
Vida Nova	143	Benedito Ruy Barbosa	21 November 1988	5 May 1989	

=== 1989 ===
Title	Ep.	Author	First aired	Last aired	Ref.
O Salvador da Pátria	186	Lauro César Muniz	9 January 1989	12 August 1989	
Que Rei Sou Eu?	185	Cassiano Gabus Mendes	13 February 1989	16 September 1989	
Pacto de Sangue	119	Regina Braga	8 May 1989	22 September 1989	
Tieta	196	Aguinaldo Silva, Ana Maria Moretzsohn & Ricardo Linhares	14 August 1989	31 March 1990	
Top Model	198	Walther Negrão & Antônio Calmon	18 September 1989	5 May 1990	
O Sexo dos Anjos	142	Ivani Ribeiro	25 September 1989	9 March 1990	

== 1990s ==
Title	Ep.	Author	First aired	Last aired	Ref.
1990
Gente Fina	136	Gonzaga Blota	12 March 1990	17 August 1990	
Rainha da Sucata	179	Silvio de Abreu	2 April 1990	29 October 1990	
Mico Preto	179	Marcílio Moraes, Leonor Bassères & Euclydes Marinho	7 May 1990	1 December 1990	
Barriga de Aluguel	243	Glória Perez	20 August 1990	31 May 1991	
Araponga	143	Lauro César Muniz	15 October 1990	29 March 1991	
Meu Bem, Meu Mal	173	Cassiano Gabus Mendes	29 October 1990	18 May 1991	
Lua Cheia de Amor	191	Ana Maria Moretzsohn, Ricardo Linhares & Maria Carmem Barbosa	3 December 1990	13 July 1991	
1991
O Dono do Mundo	197	Gilberto Braga	20 May 1991	4 January 1992	
Salomé	107	Sérgio Marques	3 June 1991	4 October 1991	
Vamp	179	Antônio Calmon	15 July 1991	8 February 1992	
Felicidade	203	Manoel Carlos	7 October 1991	30 May 1992	
1992
Pedra sobre Pedra	178	Aguinaldo Silva	6 January 1992	31 July 1992	
Perigosas Peruas	173	Carlos Lombardi & Lauro César Muniz	10 February 1992	28 August 1992	
Despedida de Solteiro	206	Walther Negrão	1 June 1992	30 January 1993	
De Corpo e Alma	185	Glória Perez	3 August 1992	5 March 1993	
Deus nos Acuda	178	Silvio de Abreu	31 August 1992	27 March 1993	
1993
Mulheres de Areia	201	Ivani Ribeiro	1 February 1993	25 September 1993	
Renascer	213	Benedito Ruy Barbosa	8 March 1993	14 November 1993	
O Mapa da Mina	137	Cassiano Gabus Mendes	29 March 1993	3 September 1993	
Olho no Olho	185	Antônio Calmon	6 September 1993	8 April 1994	
Sonho Meu	197	Marcílio Moraes	27 September 1993	14 May 1994	
Fera Ferida	210	Aguinaldo Silva, Ricardo Linhares & Ana Maria Moretzsohn	15 November 1993	16 July 1994	
1994
A Viagem	167	Ivani Ribeiro	11 April 1994	22 October 1994	
Tropicaliente	194	Walter Negrão	16 May 1994	31 December 1994	
Pátria Minha	203	Gilberto Braga	18 July 1994	10 March 1995	
Quatro por Quatro	233	Carlos Lombardi	24 October 1994	22 July 1995	
1995
Irmãos Coragem	155	Dias Gomes	2 January 1995	1 July 1995	
A Próxima Vítima	203	Silvio de Abreu	13 March 1995	3 November 1995	
História de Amor	209	Manoel Carlos	3 July 1995	2 March 1996	
Cara & Coroa	213	Antônio Calmon	24 July 1995	30 March 1996	
Explode Coração	155	Glória Perez	6 November 1995	4 May 1996	
1996
Quem É Você?	159	Solange Castro Neves	4 March 1996	6 September 1996	
Vira Lata	155	Carlos Lombardi	1 April 1996	27 September 1996	
O Fim do Mundo	35	Dias Gomes	6 May 1996	14 June 1996	
O Rei do Gado	209	Benedito Ruy Barbosa	17 June 1996	15 February 1997	
Anjo de Mim	173	Walter Negrão	9 September 1996	28 March 1997	
Salsa e Merengue	177	Miguel Falabella & Maria Carmem Barbosa	30 September 1996	2 May 1997	
1997
A Indomada	203	Aguinaldo Silva & Ricardo Linhares	17 February 1997	11 October 1997	
O Amor Está no Ar	137	Alcides Nogueira	31 March 1997	6 September 1997	
Zazá	215	Lauro César Muniz	5 May 1997	9 January 1998	
Anjo Mau	173	Maria Adelaide Amaral	8 September 1997	27 March 1998	
Por Amor	191	Manoel Carlos	13 October 1997	22 May 1998	
1998
Corpo Dourado	191	Antônio Calmon	12 January 1998	21 August 1998	
Era Uma Vez	161	Walter Negrão	30 March 1998	2 October 1998	
Torre de Babel	203	Silvio de Abreu	25 May 1998	16 January 1999	
Meu Bem Querer	179	Ricardo Linhares	24 August 1998	20 January 1999	
Pecado Capital	167	Glória Perez	5 October 1998	7 May 1999	
1999
Suave Veneno	209	Aguinaldo Silva	18 January 1999	18 September 1999	
Andando nas Nuvens	197	Euclydes Marinho	22 March 1999	5 November 1999	
Força de um Desejo	227	Gilberto Braga & Alcides Nogueira	10 May 1999	29 January 2000	
Terra Nostra	221	Benedito Ruy Barbosa	20 September 1999	3 June 2000	
Vila Madalena	155	Walther Negrão	8 November 1999	5 May 2000	

== 2000s ==
Title	Ep.	Author	First aired	Last aired	Ref.
2000
Esplendor	125	Ana Maria Moretzsohn	31 January 2000	24 June 2000	
Uga-Uga	221	Carlos Lombardi	8 May 2000	19 January 2001	
Laços de Família	209	Manoel Carlos	5 June 2000	2 February 2001	
O Cravo e a Rosa	221	Walcyr Carrasco & Mário Teixeira	26 June 2000	10 March 2001	
2001
Um Anjo Caiu do Céu	185	Antônio Calmon	22 January 2001	25 August 2001	
Porto dos Milagres	203	Aguinaldo Silva & Ricardo Linhares	5 February 2001	29 September 2001	
Estrela-Guia	83	Ana Maria Moretzsohn	12 March 2001	15 June 2001	
A Padroeira	215	Walcyr Carrasco	18 June 2001	23 February 2002	
As Filhas da Mãe	125	Silvio de Abreu	27 August 2001	19 January 2002	
O Clone	221	Glória Perez	1 October 2001	14 June 2002	
2002
Desejos de Mulher	185	Euclydes Martinho	21 January 2002	24 August 2002	
Coração de Estudante	185	Emanuel Jacobina	25 February 2002	27 September 2002	
Esperança	209	Benedito Ruy Barbosa & Walcyr Carrasco	14 June 2002	14 February 2003	
O Beijo do Vampiro	215	Antônio Calmon	26 August 2002	3 May 2003	
Sabor da Paixão	149	Ana Maria Moretzsohn	30 July 2002	21 March 2003	
2003
Mulheres Apaixonadas	203	Manoel Carlos	17 February 2003	10 October 2003	
Agora É que São Elas	143	Ricardo Linhares	24 March 2003	6 September 2003	
Kubanacan	227	Carlos Lombardi	5 May 2003	24 January 2004	
Chocolate com Pimenta	209	Walcyr Carrasco	8 September 2003	7 May 2004	
Celebridade	221	Gilberto Braga	13 October 2003	25 June 2004	
2004
Da Cor do Pecado	185	João Emanuel Carneiro	26 January 2004	28 August 2004	
Cabocla	167	Benedito Ruy Barbosa	10 May 2004	20 November 2004	
Senhora do Destino	221	Aguinaldo Silva	28 June 2004	11 March 2005	
Começar de Novo	196	Antônio Calmon & Elizabeth Jhin	30 August 2004	16 April 2005	
Como uma Onda	179	Walther Negrão	22 November 2004	18 June 2005	
2005
América	203	Glória Perez	14 March 2005	4 November 2005	
A Lua Me Disse	143	Maria Carmem Barbosa & Miguel Falabella	18 April 2005	30 September 2005	
Alma Gêmea	227	Walcyr Carrasco	20 June 2005	10 March 2006	
Bang Bang	173	Mário Prata	3 October 2005	21 April 2006	
Belíssima	209	Sílvio de Abreu	7 November 2005	7 July 2006	
2006
Sinhá Moça	185	Benedito Ruy Barbosa	13 March 2006	13 October 2006	
Cobras & Lagartos	179	João Emanuel Carneiro	24 April 2006	18 November 2006	
Páginas da Vida	203	Manoel Carlos	10 July 2006	2 March 2007	
O Profeta	178	Duca Rachid & Thelma Guedes	16 October 2006	11 May 2007	
Pé na Jaca	179	Carlos Lombardi	20 November 2006	15 June 2007	
2007
Paraíso Tropical	179	Gilberto Braga & Ricardo Linhares	5 March 2007	28 September 2007	
Eterna Magia	148	Elizabeth Jhin	14 May 2007	2 November 2007	
Sete Pecados	209	Walcyr Carrasco	18 June 2007	15 February 2008	
Duas Caras	210	Aguinaldo Silva	1 October 2007	31 May 2008	
Desejo Proibido	154	Walther Negrão	5 November 2007	2 May 2008	
2008
Beleza Pura	179	Andréa Maltarolli	18 February 2008	12 September 2008	
Ciranda de Pedra	131	Alcides Nogueira	5 May 2008	3 October 2009	
A Favorita	197	João Emanuel Carneiro	2 June 2008	16 January 2009	
Três Irmãs	179	Antônio Calmon	15 September 2008	10 April 2009	
Negócio da China	136	Miguel Falabella	6 October 2008	13 March 2009	
2009
Caminho das Índias	203	Glória Perez	19 January 2009	11 September 2009	
Paraíso	173	Benedito Ruy Barbosa	16 March 2009	2 October 2009	
Caras & Bocas	232	Walcyr Carrasco	13 April 2009	8 January 2010	
Viver a Vida	209	Manoel Carlos	14 September 2009	14 May 2010	
Cama de Gato	161	Duca Rachid & Thelma Guedes	5 October 2009	9 April 2010	

== 2010s ==
Title	Ep.	Author	First aired	Last aired	Ref.
2010
Tempos Modernos	161	Bosco Brasil	11 January 2010	16 July 2010	
Escrito nas Estrelas	143	Elizabeth Jhin	12 April 2010	24 September 2010	
Passione	209	Silvio de Abreu	17 May 2010	14 January 2011	
Ti Ti Ti	209	Maria Adelaide Amaral	19 July 2010	18 March 2011	
Araguaia	166	Walther Negrão	27 September 2010	8 April 2011	
2011
Insensato Coração	185	Gilberto Braga & Ricardo Linhares	17 January 2011	19 August 2011	
Morde & Assopra	179	Walcyr Carrasco	21 March 2011	14 October 2011	
Cordel Encantado	143	Duca Rachid & Thelma Guedes	11 April 2011	23 September 2011	
O Astro	64	Alcides Nogueira & Geraldo Carneiro	12 July 2011	28 October 2011	
Fina Estampa	185	Aguinaldo Silva	22 August 2011	23 March 2012	
A Vida da Gente	137	Lícia Manzo	26 September 2011	2 March 2012	
Aquele Beijo	155	Miguel Falabella	17 October 2011	13 April 2012	
2012
Amor Eterno Amor	161	Elizabeth Jhin	5 March 2012	7 September 2012	
Avenida Brasil	179	João Emanuel Carneiro	26 March 2012	19 October 2012	
Cheias de Charme	143	Filipe Miguez & Izabel de Oliveira	16 April 2012	28 September 2012	
Gabriela	77	Walcyr Carrasco	18 June 2012	26 October 2012	
Lado a Lado	154	João Ximenes Braga & Claudia Lage	10 September 2012	8 March 2013	
Guerra dos Sexos	179	Silvio de Abreu	1 October 2012	26 April 2013	
Salve Jorge	179	Glória Perez	22 October 2012	17 May 2013	
2013
Flor do Caribe	159	Walther Negrão	11 March 2013	13 September 2013	
Sangue Bom	160	Maria Adelaide Amaral & Vincent Villari	29 April 2013	1 November 2013	
Amor à Vida	221	Walcyr Carrasco	20 May 2013	31 January 2014	
Saramandaia	56	Dias Gomes	24 June 2013	27 September 2014	
Joia Rara	173	Duca Rachid & Thelma Guedes	16 September 2013	4 April 2014	
Além do Horizonte	155	Carlos Gregório & Marcos Bernstein	4 November 2013	2 May 2014	
2014
Em Família	143	Manoel Carlos	3 February 2014	18 July 2014	
Meu Pedacinho de Chão	96	Benedito Ruy Barbosa	7 April 2014	1 August 2014	
Geração Brasil	155	Filipe Miguez & Izabel de Oliveira	5 May 2014	31 October 2014	
O Rebu	36	George Moura & Sérgio Goldenberg	14 July 2014	12 September 2014	
Império	203	Aguinaldo Silva	21 July 2014	13 March 2015	
Boogie Oogie	185	Rui Vilhena	4 August 2014	6 March 2015	
Alto Astral	161	Daniel Ortiz	3 November 2014	8 May 2015	
2015
Sete Vidas	106	Lícia Manzo	9 March 2015	10 July 2015	
Babilônia	143	Gilberto Braga, Ricardo Linhares, & João Ximenes Braga	16 March 2015	28 August 2015	
I Love Paraisópolis	154	Alcides Nogueira & Mário Teixeira	11 May 2015	6 November 2015	
Verdades Secretas	64	Walcyr Carrasco	8 June 2015	25 September 2015	
Além do Tempo	161	Elizabeth Jihn	13 July 2015	15 January 2016	
A Regra do Jogo	167	João Emanuel Carneiro	31 August 2015	11 March 2016	
Totalmente Demais	175	Rosane Svartman, Paulo Halm	9 November 2015	30 May 2016	
2016
Êta Mundo Bom!	190	Walcyr Carrasco	18 January 2016	26 August 2016	
Velho Chico	172	Benedito Ruy Barbosa	14 March 2016	30 September 2016	
Liberdade, Liberdade	67	Mário Teixeira	11 April 2016	4 August 2016	
Haja Coração	138	Daniel Ortiz	31 May 2016	8 November 2016	
Sol Nascente	175	Walther Negrão, Suzana Pires, & Júlio Fischer	29 August 2016	21 March 2017	
A Lei do Amor	155	Maria Adelaide Amaral & Vincent Villari	3 October 2016	31 March 2017	
Rock Story	179	Maria Helena Nascimento	9 November 2016	5 June 2017	
2017
Novo Mundo	160	Thereza Falcão & Alessandro Marson	22 March 2017	25 September 2017	
A Força do Querer	172	Glória Perez	3 April 2017	20 October 2017	
Os Dias Eram Assim	88	Ângela Chaves & Alessandra Poggi	17 April 2017	18 September 2017	
Pega Pega	184	Claudia Souto	6 June 2017	8 January 2018	
Tempo de Amar	148	Alcides Nogueira	26 September 2017	19 March 2018	
O Outro Lado do Paraíso	172	Walcyr Carrasco	23 October 2017	11 May 2018	
2018
Deus Salve o Rei	174	Daniel Adjafre	9 January 2018	30 July 2018	
Orgulho e Paixão	162	Marcos Bernstein	20 March 2018	24 September 2018	
Onde Nascem os Fortes	53	George Moura & Sergio Goldenberg	23 April 2018	16 July 2018	
Segundo Sol	155	João Emanuel Carneiro	14 May 2018	9 November 2018	
O Tempo Não Para	156	Mário Teixeira	31 July 2018	28 January 2019	
Espelho da Vida	160	Elizabeth Jhin	25 September 2018	1 April 2019	
O Sétimo Guardião	161	Aguinaldo Silva	12 November 2018	17 May 2019	
2019
Verão 90	154	Izabel de Oliveira & Paula Amaral	29 January 2019	26 July 2019	
Órfãos da Terra	154	Duca Rachid & Thelma Guedes	2 April 2019	27 September 2019	
A Dona do Pedaço	161	Walcyr Carrasco	20 May 2019	22 November 2019	
Bom Sucesso	155	Rosane Svartman & Paulo Halm	29 July 2019	24 January 2020	
Éramos Seis	154	Ângela Chaves	30 September 2019	27 March 2020	
Amor de Mãe	125	Manuela Dias	25 November 2019	9 April 2021	

== 2020s ==
Title	Ep.	Author	First aired	Last aired	Ref.
2020
Salve-se Quem Puder	107	Daniel Ortiz	27 January 2020	16 July 2021	
2021
Nos Tempos do Imperador	154	Thereza Falcão & Alessandro Marson	9 August 2021	4 February 2022	
Um Lugar ao Sol	119	Lícia Manzo	8 November 2021	25 March 2022	
Quanto Mais Vida, Melhor!	161	Mauro Wilson	22 November 2021	27 May 2022	
2022
Além da Ilusão	167	Alessandra Poggi	7 February 2022	19 August 2022	
Pantanal	167	Bruno Luperi	28 March 2022	7 October 2022	
Cara e Coragem	197	Claudia Souto	30 May 2022	13 January 2023	
Mar do Sertão	178	Mario Teixeira	22 August 2022	17 March 2023	
Travessia	179	Glória Perez	10 October 2022	5 May 2023	
2023
Vai na Fé	179	Rosane Svartman	16 January 2023	11 August 2023	
Amor Perfeito	161	Duca Rachid, Júlio Fischer & Elisio Lopes Jr.	20 March 2023	22 September 2023	
Terra e Paixão	221	Walcyr Carrasco	8 May 2023	19 January 2024	
Fuzuê	173	Gustavo Reiz	14 August 2023	1 March 2024	
Elas por Elas	171	Thereza Falcão & Alessandro Marson	25 September 2023	12 April 2024	
2024
Renascer	197	Bruno Luperi	22 January 2024	6 September 2024	
Família é Tudo	177	Daniel Ortiz	4 March 2024	27 September 2024	
No Rancho Fundo	171	Mario Teixeira	15 April 2024	1 November 2024	
Mania de Você	173	João Emanuel Carneiro	9 September 2024	28 March 2025	
Volta por Cima	180	Claudia Souto	30 September 2024	26 April 2025	
Garota do Momento	202	Alessandra Poggi	4 November 2024	27 June 2025	
2025
Vale Tudo	173	Manuela Dias	31 March 2025	17 October 2025	
Dona de Mim	218	Rosane Svartman	28 April 2025	9 January 2026	
Êta Mundo Melhor!	220	Walcyr Carrasco & Mauro Wilson	30 June 2025	13 March 2026	
Três Graças	179	Aguinaldo Silva, Virgílio Silva & Zé Dassilva	20 October 2025	15 May 2026	
2026
Coração Acelerado	177	Izabel de Oliveira & Maria Helena Nascimento	12 January 2026	14 August 2026	
A Nobreza do Amor	193	Duca Rachid, Júlio Fischer & Elísio Lopes Jr.	16 March 2026	6 November 2026	
Quem Ama Cuida	TBA	Walcyr Carrasco & Claudia Souto	18 May 2026	TBA	
Por Você	TBA	Dino Cantelli & Juliana Peres	17 August 2026	TBA	
Lá na Minha Terra	TBA	Mario Teixeira	9 November 2026	TBA	
Upcoming
Avenida Brasil 2	TBA	João Emanuel Carneiro	27 January 2027	TBA	
Elas que Lutem	TBA	Daniel Ortiz, Victor Athrerino & Flávia Bessone	8 March 2027	TBA	
Romance em São Paulo	TBA	Thelma Guedes	27 April 2027	TBA	
Tempos de Glória	TBA	Carla Faour & Julia Spadaccini	5 July 2027	TBA	

== See also ==
- List of 8/9 PM telenovelas of TV Globo
- List of 11 PM telenovelas of TV Globo
- List of 6 PM telenovelas of TV Globo
- List of 7 PM telenovelas of TV Globo
- List of 10 PM telenovelas of TV Globo
