= O Homem Que Deve Morrer =

Brazilian television series

- Genre: Telenovela
- Created by: Janete Clair
- Directed by: Daniel Filho; Milton Gonçalves
- Starring: Tarcísio Meira; Glória Menezes; Jardel Filho; Cláudio Cavalcanti; Dina Sfat; Paulo José; Gilberto Martinho; Betty Faria
- Opening theme: "O Homem Que Deve Morrer"by Nonato Buzar
- Country of origin: Brazil
- Original language: Portuguese
- No. of episodes: 258

Original release
- Network: Rede Globo
- Release: 14 June 1971 – 8 April 1972

Related
- Irmãos Coragem; Selva de Pedra

O Homem Que Deve Morrer is a Brazilian telenovela produced and broadcast by Rede Globo. It premiered on 14 June 1971 and ended on 8 April 1972, with a total of 258 episodes. It is the tenth "novela das oito" to be aired on the timeslot. It was created and written by Janete Clair, and directed by Daniel Filho and Milton Gonçalves.

== Cast ==
- Tarcísio Meira - Cyro Valdez
- Glória Menezes - Ester
- Jardel Filho - Otto Frederico von Müller
- Cláudio Cavalcanti - Baby Liberato
- Dina Sfat - Vanda Vidal
- Paulo José - André
- Gilberto Martinho - Mestre Jonas
- Waldir Onofre - Pedrão
- Betty Faria - Inês
- Edney Giovenazzi - Ricardo
- Emiliano Queiroz - Dr. Paulus
- Arlete Salles - Lia
- Zilka Salaberry - Bárbara
- Ênio Santos - Professor Valdez
- Neuza Amaral - Orjana
- Lídia Mattos - Catarina
- Macedo Neto - Commander Liberato
- Ida Gomes - Júlia
- Carlos Eduardo Dolabella - Cesário
- Lúcia Alves - Tula
- Álvaro Aguiar - Max
- Ana Ariel - Rosa
- Suzana Faini - Sônia
- Antonio Pitanga - Lucas Pé-na-Cova
- Léa Garcia - Luana
- Ruth de Souza - Das Dores
- Ivan Cândido - Godoy
- Arnaldo Weiss - Professor Zacarias
- Tânia Scher - Beth
- Zeny Pereira - Conceição
- Dary Reis - Valter Coice-de-Mula
- Miriam Pires - Carolina
- Fernando José - Almeida
- Lícia Magna - Clara
- Ângela Leal - Ângela
- Monah Delacy - Cândida
- Francisco Serrano - Dr. Gustavo
- Paulo César Pereio - Dr. Roberto
- Vinícius Salvatori - Delegado
- Jorge Cherques - Werner Von Müller
