= Lúcia Alves (actress) =

Brazilian actress (1948–2025)

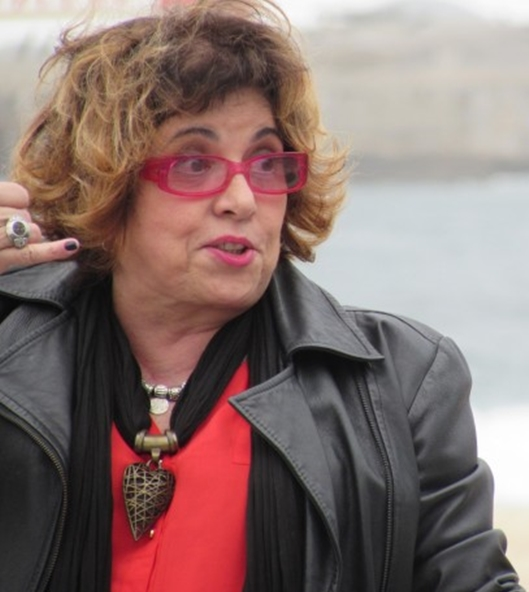
- Born: Lúcia Alves da Silva; 4 October 1948; Rio de Janeiro, Brazil
- Died: 24 April 2025 (aged 76); Rio de Janeiro, Brazil
- Occupation: Actress
- Years active: 1965–2025
- Spouse: Fred Schlesinger (1973–2007)
- Children: 1

Lúcia Alves da Silva (4 October 1948 – 24 April 2025) was a Brazilian actress.

== Early life and career ==
Alves was born in Rio de Janeiro on 4 October 1948. Although she became well established in her career on television, she began her career in movies in the middle of the 1960s with a role in the 1965 J. B. Tanko film Um Ramo para Luíza. Despite her success on television, she would continue to work in theatre and film as well.

She made her debut on telenovelas around this time, in particular with the 1969 TV Tupi novela Enquanto Houver Estrelas, directed by Mário Brasini, but she would become famous for her role as Potira in Irmãos Coragem, written by Janete Clair, in 1970. She married confectionist Fred Schleisinger on 29 July 1973, in a ceremony that had Zilka Salaberry and Edney Giovenazzi as godparents. After her marriage, Alves went on to play the role of protagonist in Helena, in 1975, an adaptation by Gilberto Braga based on the romantic novel of the same name by Machado de Assis, and Veroca, in Plumas &amp; Paetês, written by Cassiano Gabus Mendes in 1980.

During the 1970s, she would perform in another film directed by Tanko, Pedro Camargo's Pais Quadrados, Filhos Avançados, Estranho Triângulo, and, O Homem da Cabeça de Ouro, by Alberto Pieralisi.

In the 1980s, she acted in Tortura Cruel, directed by Tony Vieira, as well as in Lua Cheia, by Alain Fresnot. After participating in just 1 film in the 1990s, Fica Comigo by Tizuka Yamasaki, Alves would return to acting in many projects in the 2000s. She acted in Quase Dois Irmãos, by Lúcia Murat, and with a major success in Bendito Fruto (2004), by Sérgio Goldenberg, as hairstylist Telma. For her role, Alves received the Best Supporting Actress award at the Festival de Brasília 2004, her first award.

In 2007, Alves became part of the cast of Sob Nova Direção and made a special appearance in the series Toma Lá, Dá Cá.

In 2009, she was hired by SBT to participate in the telenovela Uma Rosa Com Amor. Inspired by the 1972–1973 drama by Vicente Sesso, the new version was written by Tiago Santiago, with a collaboration by Renata Dias Gomes. The telenovela, directed by Del Rangel, debuted in March 2010.

== Personal life and death ==
Alves was the daughter of banker Almir Alves da Silva and psychologist Edy Pinheiro Alves. She was married for about 30 years to Fred Schlesinger, with whom she had a daughter.

Alves died on 24 April 2025, at the age of 76. She had been hospitalized ten days prior, and was receiving treatment for pancreatic cancer.

== Filmography ==
=== Television ===
Year	Title	Role	Notes
1969	Enquanto Houver Estrelas	Joana	
1969	Verão Vermelho	Geralda	
1970	Irmãos Coragem	Índia Potira	
1971	O Homem Que Deve Morrer	Tula	
1972	Bicho do Mato	Sílvia Chaves Nogueira	
1972	A Patota	Regina	
1973	Carinhoso	Leda Maria	
1973	O Semideus	Beatriz	
1974	Supermanoela	Raquel	
1975	Helena	Helena	
1975	Senhora	Maria Seixas (Mariquinhas)	
1976	O Feijão e o Sonho	Creuza	
1976	Despedida de Casado	Efigênia	Censored novela
1977	Nina	Chiquinha	
1978	Sítio do Picapau Amarelo	Ariadne	Episode: "O Minotauro"
1978	Pecado Rasgado	Elizabete (Betinha)	
1979	Os Gigantes	Maria Lúcia	
1979	Malu Mulher	Mulher de Amorim	
1980	Plumas e Paetês	Vera Lúcia (Veroca)	
1981	Amizade Colorida	Mônica	Episode: "Barriga"
1981	Jogo da Vida	Clarita	
1982	Final Feliz	Yolanda	
1983	Eu Prometo	Cássia Romani	
1984	Partido Alto	Adriana Pinheiro	
1985	Ti Ti Ti	Nicole de Souza	
1986	Anos Dourados	Vitória	
1986	Hipertensão	Beatriz	
1989	Kananga do Japão	Dayse	
1990	Barriga de Aluguel	Moema Paranhos	
1991	Amazônia	Maria Rabuda	
1993	Guerra sem Fim	Lili Marlene	
1993	Contos de Verão	Nádia	
1994	Tropicaliente	Isabel	
1995	Engraçadinha: Seus Amores e Seus Pecados	Mulher no parto de Duval	
1995	Irmãos Coragem	Maria Clara	
1995	Você Decide		Episode: "A Herança"
1995	Malhação	Tulê Berná	Participation
1996	O Fim do Mundo	Fátima Badaró (Fafá)	
1998–99	Mulher	Enfª. Telma	
1998	Xuxa Especial: Uma Carta para Deus	Carmem	Year end special
1998	Didi Malasarte	Tônia	Year end special
2000	Você Decide	Cidinha	Episode: "A Viagem"
2000	O Cravo e a Rosa	Dra. Hildegard Beltrão	Episode: "6 de dezembro–5 de janeiro"
2001	Brava Gente	Isaura	Episode: "O Comprador de Fazendas"
2004	Metamorphoses	Bel	
2004	A Diarista	Edna	Episode: "Fama, Mesa e Banho"
2005	Começar de Novo	Ítala Magnani	Episode: "1 de março–12 de abril"
2005	A Diarista	Silvia	Episode: "Um Batoque de Classe"
2006	A Grande Família	Marlene Maria Palmeira	Episode: "A Mãe de Meu Melhor Amigo"
2006	Carga Pesada	Juçara	Episode: "Mata o véio, Mata!"
2007	Toma Lá, Dá Cá	Léa Lúcia	Episode: "O Sequestro"
2007	Sob Nova Direção	Berta	
2010	Uma Rosa com Amor	Joana Camargo (Joana Carioca)	
2013	Joia Rara	Nair	Episodes: "23–24 de outubro"
2015	República do Peru	Armênia (Memê)	

=== Film ===
Year	Title	Role
1965	Um Ramo para Luísa	Celinha
1968	O Homem Nu	Menina no sofá
1970	Pais Quadrados... Filhos Avançados!	Duda
1970	Estranho Triângulo	Namorada de Durval
1974	Nas Garras da Sedução	Márcia
1975	O Homem da Cabeça de Ouro	Luísa
1980	Fêmeas Violentadas, Tortura Cruel	Viviane
1982	Tem Piranha no Aquário	Lucinha
1989	Lua Cheia	Lia
1996	Fica Comigo	Marly
2004	Bendito Fruto	Telma
2005	Almost Brothers	Mãe de Juliana
2016	Só pelo Amor Vale a Vida	

== Theatre ==
Year	Title	Role	Director
1967	Família Até Certo Ponto	Frankie	Antonio de Cabo
1967	Deus Lhe Pague	Maria	Antonio de Cabo
1967	Pluft, o Fantasminha	Maribel	Maria Clara Machado
1968	Quarenta Quilates	Aniick	João Bithencourt
1970	Toda Donzela Tem Um Pai Que é Uma Fera	Daisy	Oswaldo Loureiro
1971	Os Últimos		Carlos Murtinho
1974	A Teoria na Prática é a Outra	Lulu	Antônio Pedro
1977	As Mimosas		Klauss Vianna
1978	Era Uma Vez nos Anos 50	Ana Maria	Domingos de Oliveira
1979	Sinal de Vida		Marcos Paulo
1984	Maria, Maria, Maria	Maria	Oswaldo Loureiro
1986	O Que o Mordomo Viu	Mrs. Prentice	Flávio Rangel
1988	Quem Programa Ação Computa Confusão		Atílio Riccó
1989	Brasileiras e Brasileiros		Cecil Thiré
1995	Cheiro de Mulher		Cláudio Torres Gonzaga
1996	As Lobas	Amélia	Antônio Pedro

== Awards and nominations ==
Year	Award	Category	Nomination	Result	Ref
1971	Troféu Imprensa	Best Female Revelation	Irmãos Coragem	Nominated	
2004	Grande Prêmio do Cinema Brasileiro	Best Supporting Actress	Bendito Fruto	Nominated	
2004	Troféu Candango do Festival de Brasília	Best Supporting Actress	Bendito Fruto	Won	
2013	Troféu Top of Business	Conjunto da Obra	Homenagem	Won	
