= Sangue e Areia =

- Genre: Telenovela
- Created by: Janete Clair
- Directed by: Daniel Filho; Régis Cardoso
- Starring: Leila Diniz
- Country of origin: Brazil
- Original language: Portuguese
- No. of episodes: 125

Original release
- Network: TV Globo
- Release: 18 December 1967 – 25 June 1968

Related
- Anastácia, a Mulher sem Destino; Passo dos Ventos

Sangue e Areia is a Brazilian telenovela produced and broadcast by TV Globo. It is based on the novel Blood and Sand by the Spanish writer Vicente Blasco Ibáñez. It premiered on 18 December 1967 and ended on 25 June 1968. It was the fifth "novela das oito" to be aired in the timeslot.

== Plot ==
Juan Gallardo, the son of a bullfighter who died in an enclosure for bullfighting, decides to follow in the steps of his father. Despite his family's opposition, he begins bullfighting and ends up abandoning them altogether. He is later faced with a love triangle with two women: Pillar, a simple young woman who always loved him, and Doña Sol, an aristocrat who is educated and cultured.

== Cast ==
Actor	Character
Tarcísio Meira	Juan Gallardo
Glória Menezes	Doña Sol
Theresa Amayo	Pillar
Cláudio Marzo	Miguel
Amilton Fernandes	Dom Ricardo
Myrian Pérsia	Dolores
Arlete Salles	Mercedes
Ana Ariel	Esmeralda
José Lourenço	Carabato
Neuza Amaral	Encarnación
Nelson Xavier	Zorba
Oswaldo Loureiro	Antônio
Ênio Santos	Dr. Luiz
Maria Esmeralda	Consuelo
Sônia Ferreira	Rosário
Luiz Pires (Rodolpho Vallon)	Toureiro

Sangue e Areia is the last telenovela by actor Amilton Fernandes, who portrayed the villain Dom Ricardo Fernandes died in a tragic road accident on 8 April 1968.
