= Glauce Rocha =

Brazilian actress

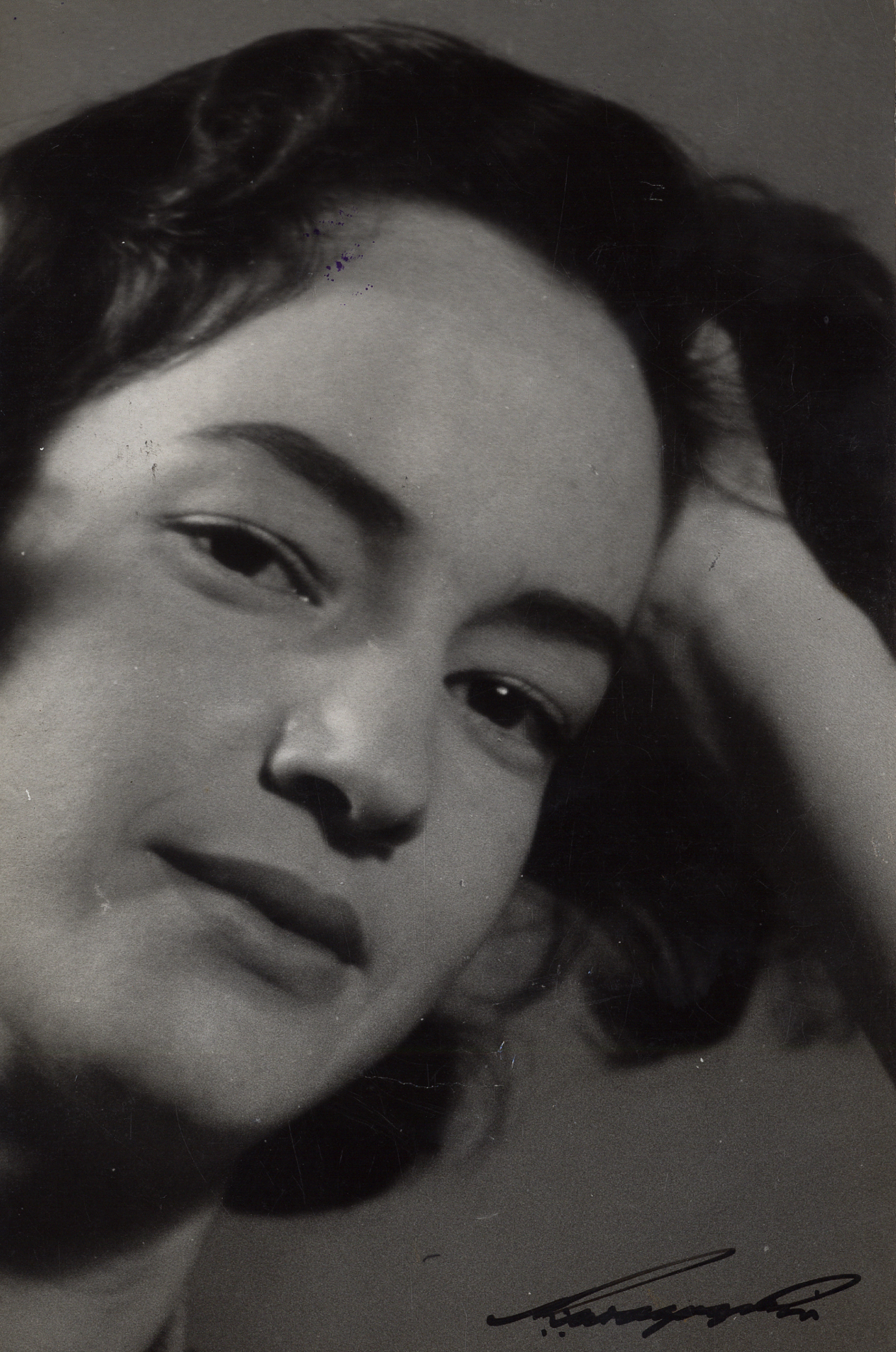
- Born: 16 August 1930; Campo Grande, Brazil
- Died: 12 August 1971 (aged 40); São Paulo, Brazil
- Occupation: Actress
- Years active: 1950-1971

Glauce Rocha (16 August 1930 – 12 October 1971) was a Brazilian actress. She appeared in 34 films and television shows between 1950 and 1971. She starred in the film Os Cafajestes, which was entered into the 12th Berlin International Film Festival.

== Filmography ==
=== Film ===
Year	Title	Role	Notes
1950	Aviso aos Navegantes	—N/a	Cameo
1952	Aventura no Rio	—N/a	
1952	Com o Diabo no Corpo	—N/a	
1954	Rua sem Sol	Marta	
1955	Rio, 100 Degrees F.	Rosa	
1957	O Noivo da Girafa	Inezita	
1958	Traficantes do Crime	—N/a	
1959	Helena	—N/a	Unfinished
1959	É um Caso de Polícia	Belinha	Launched on 2016 in Festival do Rio
1961	Mulheres e Milhões	—N/a	
1962	Cinco Vezes Favela	Favelada	
1962	The Unscrupulous Ones	Prostitute	
1962	Quatro Mulheres para um Herói	Widow	
1962	Sol sobre a Lama	Pureza	
1963	Marafa	—N/a	Unfinished
1964	O Beijo	Lady on the nightclub	
1966	Engraçadinha depois dos Trinta	—N/a	
1966	A Derrota	Woman	
1967	Entranced Earth	Sara	
1968	Na Mira do Assassino	Magricela	
1969	Tempo de Violência	Maria da Glória	
1969	Incrível, Fantástico, Extraordinário	—N/a	
1970	A Navalha na Carne	Neusa Suely	
1970	Roberto Carlos e o Diamante Cor-de-rosa	—N/a	
1970	O Dia Marcado	Glória	
1971	Um Homem sem Importância	Selma	
1972	Jardim de Guerra	—N/a	Posthumous release
1972	Cassy Jones, o Magnífico Sedutor	Frida	Posthumous release

=== Television ===
Year	Title	Role
1971	Hospital	Helena
1970	Irmãos Coragem	Estela
1969	Véu de Noiva	Helena
1969	Rosa Rebelde	—N/a
1969	A Última Valsa	Kathy
1968	Passo dos Ventos	Bárbara
1966	A Noiva do Passado	—N/a
1964	Casa de Bonecas	—N/a
1961	Adeus às Armas	—N/a
1959	Cabocla	Zuca
1958	O Jovem Dr. Ricardo	—N/a

== Stage ==
- Uma Ponte Sobre O Pântano- 1971
- O Exercício- 1969
- Um Uísque Para o Rei Saul- 1968- Prêmio Moliére de melhor Atriz
- A Agonia do Rei-1968
- Amor por Anexis- 1967
- Perto do Coração Selvagem- 1965
- Electra- 1965
- Terror e Miséria no III Reich- 1963
- Doce Pássaro da Juventude- 1960
- As Três Irmãs- 1960
- A Beata Maria do Egito- 1959
- A Cantora Careca- 1958
- A Lição-1958
