= Cavalo de Aço =

1973 Brazilian telenovela

- Genre: Telenovela
- Created by: Walther Negrão
- Directed by: Walther Avancini; David Grimberg; Daniel Filho
- Starring: Tarcísio Meira; Glória Menezes; Ziembinski; Betty Faria
- Opening theme: "Cavalo de Aço"
- Country of origin: Brazil
- Original language: Portuguese
- No. of episodes: 179

Original release
- Network: TV Globo
- Release: 24 January – 21 August 1973

Related
- Selva de Pedra; O Semideus

Cavalo de Aço is a Brazilian telenovela produced and broadcast by TV Globo. It premiered on 24 January 1973 and ended on 21 August 1973, with a total of 179 episodes in black and white. It is the twelfth "novela das oito" to be aired on the timeslot. It was created and written by Walter Negrão and directed by Walter Avancini, David Grimberg and Daniel Filho.

== Cast ==
- Tarcísio Meira - Rodrigo Soares
- Glória Menezes - Miranda
- Ziembinski - Max
- Betty Faria - Joana
- Edson França - Lucas
- Cláudio Cavalcanti - Aurélio
- Milton Moraes - Carlão
- Arlete Salles - Lenita
- Carlos Vereza - Santo
- Renata Sorrah - Camila
- José Wilker - Atílio
- Stênio Garcia - Brucutu
- José Lewgoy - Professor
- Dary Reis - Sabá
- Suzana Gonçalves - Bisteca
- Elizângela - Teresinha
- Mário Lago - Inácio
- Maria Luiza Castelli - Marta
- Paulo Gonçalves - Tobias
- Miriam Pires - Benvinda
- Sônia Oiticica - Catarina
- Nilton Villar - Jorge
- Paulo Padilha - Almeida
- Tony Ferreira - Dr. Castro
- Germano Filho - Arsênio
- Francisco Milani - Moraes
- Walter Mattesco - Dr. Renato
- Talita Miranda - Maria Amélia
- Marilene Silva - Alzira
- Sérgio Mansur - Ciro
- Reinaldo Gonzaga - Felipe
- Urbano Lóes - Campelo
- Nair Prestes - Juventina
- Darcy de Souza - Socorro
- Francisco Silva - Tonho
- Rosana Garcia - Ninita
- Ricardo Garcia - Zezinho
- Fúlvio Stefanini - Euclides
- Castro Gonzaga - Cecil
- Fábio Sabag - Patrocínio Cardoso
