= Irmãos Coragem =

- Genre: Telenovela
- Created by: Janete Clair
- Directed by: Daniel Filho
- Starring: Tarcísio Meira; Cláudio Cavalcanti; Cláudio Marzo; Glória Menezes; Regina Duarte; Lúcia Alves; Zilka Salaberry; Emiliano Queiroz; Ana Ariel; Carlos Eduardo Dolabella; Suzana Faini; Milton Gonçalves; Ênio Santos; Glauce Rocha; Hemílcio Fróes; Miriam Pires; Gilberto Martinho
- Opening theme: "Irmãos Coragem" by Jair Rodrigues
- Country of origin: Brazil
- Original language: Portuguese
- No. of episodes: 328 (original run)

Original release
- Network: Rede Globo
- Release: 8 June 1970 – 12 July 1971

Related
- Véu de Noiva; O Homem Que Deve Morrer; Irmãos Coragem (1995)

Irmãos Coragem is a Brazilian telenovela produced and broadcast by TV Globo. It premiered on 8 June 1970 and ended on 12 July 1971, with a total of 328 episodes. It was TV Globo's ninth "novela das oito" to be aired during that time slot. It was created and written by Janete Clair, and directed by Daniel Filho.

== Plot ==
The struggle for freedom and against oppression is the central theme of this novel which tells the story of the Coragem brothers: João, Jerônimo and Duda, in the fictional town of Coroado, in the Goiás savannah, whose main economic activity is mining. João Coragem, a rough, simple and generous man, who works honestly as a prospector, finds a valuable diamond, which is stolen by Colonel Pedro Barros, who runs the mining trade in Coroado with “iron hands” and is the most powerful man in town, dictating his rules. Despite being a peaceful man who tries to solve everything with dialog and within the law, João, after several injustices, becomes an outlaw, leading his own gang of wronged prospectors, and begins to use force to confront his tormentor, Colonel Pedro Barros. But João meets and falls in love with the shy and repressed Lara, the Colonel's sick daughter, who is unaware of her own illness. Lara has two other personalities: the spunky and wild Diana, whose behavior is the opposite of Lara's; and the counterpoint between the two, Márcia. And this ends up confusing and driving João mad.

The young Jerônimo, for his part, feels a repressed passion for his younger sister, the indigenous Potira. But in order to forget Jerônimo, she agrees to marry Rodrigo César, who fights on the side of the Courage in the confrontation against Colonel Pedro Barros. To help his brother confront the Colonel, Jerônimo joins the left-wing political party to put an end to the Colonel's excesses. But in order to escape his love for Potira, he agrees to marry Lídia Siqueira, the daughter of deputy Dr. Siqueira, out of interest.

Duda is João and Jerônimo's younger brother, a boy who, in order to follow his dream of becoming a footballer, has left behind the city, his family and his childhood sweetheart, Ritinha. She is a good girl who fights for his love when she returns to Coroado. But he is already involved with another woman, Paula, who will go to any lengths to remain by his side. The conflict grows when Ritinha spends the night with Duda, but even though nothing has happened, her father, Dr. Maciel, who has never liked the boy, forces him to marry his daughter.

== Cast ==
Actor	Character
Tarcísio Meira	João Coragem
Cláudio Marzo	Eduardo Coragem (Duda)
Cláudio Cavalcanti	Jerônimo Coragem
Glória Menezes	Maria de Lara Barros Lemos (Lara) / Diana / Márcia
Regina Duarte	Rita de Cássia Maciel (Ritinha)
Gilberto Martinho	Coronel Pedro Barros
Zilka Salaberry	Sinhana Coragem
Emiliano Queiroz	Juca Cipó
Lúcia Alves	Potira
Carlos Eduardo Dolabella	Delegado Diogo Falcão
Myriam Pérsia	Paula
Paulo Araújo	Ernani
José Augusto Branco	Rodrigo César Vidigal
Glauce Rocha	Estela Barros Lemos
Ênio Santos	Dr. Salvador Maciel
Ana Ariel	Domingas
Antônio Victor	Sebastião Coragem
Milton Gonçalves	Braz Canoeiro
Suzana Faini	Iracema (Cema)
Hemílcio Fróes	Lourenço D'Ávila / Ernesto Bianchini
Neuza Amaral	Branca D'Ávila
Miriam Pires	Dalva Lemos
Macedo Neto	Padre Bento
Jurema Penna	Indaiá
Arthur Costa Filho	Gentil Palhares
Ivan Cândido	Delegado Gerson Louzada
Ângela Leal	Yolanda
B. de Paiva	Prefeito Jorge Campos (Jorginho)
Monah Delacy	Deolinda Campos
Isaac Bardavid	Beato Zacarias
Yara Amaral	Tula
Dary Reis	Lázaro
Jacyra Silva	Beatriz
Felipe Wagner	Neco Moreira
Sônia Braga	Lídia Siqueira
Michel Robin	Alberto D'Ávila
Lourdinha Bittencourt	dona Manuela
Renato Master	Dr. Rafael Marques
Fernando José	Antenor Siqueira
Estelita Bell	dona Regina
Nélson Caruso	Cláudio
Dorinha Duval	Carmem Valéria
Arnaldo Weiss	Damião
Delorges Caminha	seu Julião
Zeny Pereira	Virgínia
Clementino Kelé	Jesuíno
Maria Esmeralda	Jurema
Waldir Onofre	Anacleto
Leda Lúcia	Margarida Campos
Moacyr Deriquém	Dr. Jarbas Valente
Ivan de Almeida	Antônio
Maria Alves	Salete
Vinícius Salvatori	Joaquim Venâncio
Dhu Moraes	Helena (Leninha)
José Steinberg	Laport
Francisco Dantas	Dr. Paulo
Sônia Clara	Glória
Fábio Mássimo	Júlio (Julinho)
Otoniel Serra	Gastão
