= O Semideus =

- Genre: Telenovela
- Created by: Janete Clair
- Directed by: Walter Avancini; Daniel Filho
- Starring: Tarcísio Meira; Glória Menezes; Francisco Cuoco; Yoná Magalhães; Juca de Oliveira; Maria Cláudia; Felipe Carone
- Opening theme: "O Semideus"
- Country of origin: Brazil
- Original language: Portuguese
- No. of episodes: 221

Production
- Running time: 50 minutes

Original release
- Network: TV Globo
- Release: 22 August 1973 – 7 May 1974

Related
- Cavalo de Aço; Fogo sobre Terra

O Semideus (Portuguese: The Demigod) is a Brazilian telenovela produced and broadcast by TV Globo. It premiered on 22 August 1973 and ended on 7 May 1974, with a total of 221 episodes in Black and white. It's the thirteenth "novela das oito" to be aired on the timeslot. It is created and written by Janete Clair and directed by Walter Avancini and Daniel Filho.

== Plot ==
Journalist Alex Garcia begins a report on the Leonardo family's industrial empire at the same time as the president of the companies, Hugo, is the victim of a conspiracy set up by his enemies - Alberto Parreiras, Gildo Graça and Lafaiete Pontes - to seize the family's assets. Accidentally kidnapped, Hugo is replaced by a look-alike within the companies and the family, the unknown Raul, who has agreed to take part in the farce in order to fatten his bank account and also pay for the treatment of a sick sister.

No one suspects that Hugo is really someone else, except Alex and Angela. She is Hugo's girlfriend, who becomes suspicious of his behavior after the accident, especially when he breaks off their relationship to marry another woman, Estela. The climax comes when the real Hugo Leonardo, having escaped from captivity and recovered from his accident, reappears to retake his place in the business and with his family.

== Production ==
In 1973, Janete Clair submitted the synopsis for a new soap opera, entitled Cidade Vazia (Empty City), to be shown on TV Globo's 8 p.m. slot, with Tarcísio Meira and Francisco Cuoco in the cast. However, shortly before recording began, the plot was vetoed by the censorship service of the military dictatorship of the Brazilian government, but was released to air the following year as Fogo sobre Terra. The impasse resulted in the end of its predecessor, Cavalo de Aço, being delayed so that the author could hastily create a new story in which she would reuse Meira and Cuoco as the protagonists, which was released by the government censorship in July of the same year with changes, including to its title, which was initially O Selvagem (The Savage), then A Cidade Nua (The Naked City) and finally O Semideus (The Demigod).

Scenes from the soap opera were shot in locations in Portugal such as the Belém Tower, the São Jerónimo Monastery and the São Jorge Castle, with portable cameras belonging to Globo - previously, in experiments with filming abroad, the equipment had been borrowed.

According to journalist Valério Almeida of the Jornal do Brasil, the telenovela's high ratings were due to the low level of competition, as the story “is full of absurdities”.

== Cast ==
- Tarcísio Meira - Hugo Leonardo / Raul de Paula
- Glória Menezes - Ângela
- Francisco Cuoco - Alex Garcia
- Maria Cláudia - Estela
- Juca de Oliveira - Alberto Parreiras
- Yoná Magalhães - Adriana Penha
- Nívea Maria - Soninha
- Ziembinski - Padre Miodek
- Yara Cortes - Sula
- Miriam Pires - Dulce Leonardo
- Felipe Carone - Gildo Graça
- Paulo Padilha - Dr. Lafayette Pontes
- Monah Delacy - Santa
- Ary Fontoura - Mauro
- Stênio Garcia - Lorde José
- Renata Fronzi - Paloma
- Antônio Patiño - Horácio
- Mary Daniel - Joyce
- Castro Gonzaga - Azevedo
- Gracinda Freire - Juventina
- Ênio Santos - Santana
- Macedo Neto - Dr. Fausto
- Ana Ariel - Clara
- Jardel Mello - Dr. Paulo
- Ângela Leal - Carmem
- Ivan Cândido - Wálter
- Heloísa Helena - Elza
- Irma Alvarez - Rachel
- Carlos Duval - Almeida
- Roberto Faissal - Januário
- Hemílcio Fróes - Quinzinho (Joaquim)
- Lúcia Alves - Beatriz
- Tony Ferreira - Telmo
- Suzana Gonçalves - Norma (Norminha)
- Rodolfo Arena - Osvaldo
- Roberto Bomfim - Carlos
- Françoise Forton - Wanda
- Maria Cristina Nunes - Leda
- Paulo Ramos - Dr. Renato
- Roberto Pirillo - Lulu
- Denise Dumont - Analu (Ana Lúcia)
- Diogo Vilela - Diogo
- Glória Pires - Ione
- Júlio César Vieira - Manuel (Maneco)
- Rosana Garcia - Carmem (Carminha)
- Isabela Garcia - Clara (Clarinha)
- Sérgio de Oliveira - Abílio
- Marcele Russo - Durvalina
- Sérgio Mansur - Ruy Reis
- Mário Petráglia - Juca
