= Nívea Maria =

Brazilian actress

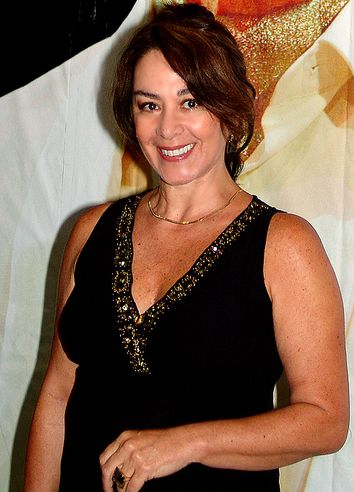
- Nívea Maria in 2005
- Born: Nívea Maria Cândido Graieb; 7 March 1947 (age 79); São Paulo, Brazil
- Occupation: Actress
- Years active: 1964–present
- Spouses: Édson França (m. 1968; sep. 1975) Herval Rossano (m. 1976; div. 2003)
- Children: 3
- Parent(s): Carlos Graieb (father); Maria de Lourdes Cândido Graieb (mother)
- Relatives: Glauce Graieb (younger sister)

Nívea Maria Cândido Graieb (born 7 March 1947) is a Brazilian actress.

== Career ==
While working as a model, she was discovered by director Walter Avancini at age 17. Avancini helped Nívea land her first role in the soap opera in A Outra Face de Anita, aired by TV Excelsior of São Paulo in 1964.

In more than forty years was uninterrupted presence on television. Participated in numerous successful soap operas, with important characters, such as Gabriela, A Moreninha (1975), Dona Xepa (1977), Maria, Maria (1978), Coração Alado (1980), the miniseries Anos Dourados (1986), Brega & Chique (1987), Meu Bem, Meu Mal (1990), Pedra sobre Pedra (1992), O Clone (2001), the miniseries A Casa das Sete Mulheres, Celebridade (2003), O Profeta (2006) and Caminho das Índias (2009). Recently, he made a very special involvement in the novel by Gilberto Braga, Insensato Coração (2011).

In 2006, Nivea Maria participated in the reality show, Dança dos Famosos, the program Domingão do Faustão, and Rede Globo.

Maria took over the role of Maude in the 2022 relaunch of the theatre play Ensina-me a Viver based on the 1971 American film Harold and Maude, replacing actress Glória Menezes. Menezes had previously led the lead role of Maude in the original debut of the play in 2007 and in a second edition in 2015. Both in the plays with Menezes as well as with Maria, the actor portraying Harold was Arlindo Lopes.

She was cast in the soap opera Aquele Beijo. She also acted in the novel Salve Jorge Isaurinha, the family matriarch Alcântara Vieira.

== Personal life ==
She is the sister of actress Glauce Graieb. She was married to actor Edson França, with whom he had two children: Viviane and Edson, and divorced director of the nucleus of the Rede Globo soap operas, Herval Rossano (1976–2003) with whom she had daughter Vanessa (1980).

== Filmography ==
Television
Year	Title	Role
1964	A Outra Face de Anita	Patrícia
1964	Melodia Fatal	Miriam
1964	A Moça que Veio de Longe	
1965	A Indomável	Branca
1965	O Preço de uma Vida	Tula de Linhares
1969	Sangue do Meu Sangue	Cíntia
1969	A Cabana do Pai Tomás	Elisa
1972	O Primeiro Amor	Helena
1972	Uma Rosa com Amor	Terezinha
1973	O Semideus	Soninha
1973	Noites Brancas	
1974	Caso Especial	
1974	Corrida do Ouro	Wânia
1975	Gabriela	Jerusa Bastos
1975	A Moreninha	Carolina
1976	O Feijão e o Sonho	Maria Rosa
1976	Duas Vidas	Hebe
1977	Dona Xepa	Rosália
1978	Maria, Maria	Maria Alves / Maria Dusá
1980	Olhai os lírios do campo	Olívia Miranda
1980	Coração Alado	Roberta Karany
1981	Terras do Sem-Fim	Donana
1983	El juego de la vida	Vanessa
1984	Livre para Voar	Bia
1984	Padre Cícero	Adélia
1986	Anos Dourados	Beatriz
1986	Caso Verdade	
1986	Mania de Querer	Vanessa
1987	Brega & Chique	Zilda
1988	Vida Nova	Gema
1989	República	D. Margarida Gusmão
1990	Gente Fina	Joana
1990	Meu Bem, Meu Mal	Berenice Castro
1992	Pedra sobre Pedra	Ximena Vilares
1993	Sonho Meu	Elisa
1994	Você Decide	Madá
1994	Tropicaliente	Soledad
1995	Malhação	Antônia
1995	Explode Coração	Alícia
1996	Você Decide	
1996	A Vida Como Ela É	
1997	A Justiceira	Augusta
1998	Você Decide	
1998	Mulher	
1998	A Comédia da Vida Privada	Diana
1998	Você Decide	Lara
1999	Suave Veneno	Nana (Emiliana)
1999	Vila Madalena	Adélia
2000	Terra Nostra	Gorgo Guitérrez
2001	O Clone	Edna Albieri
2003	A Casa das Sete Mulheres	D. Maria Gonçalves
2003	Brava Gente	Herself
2003	Os Normais	Herself
2003	Celebridade	Corina Mello Diniz
2005	América	Mazé (Maria José Higino)
2006	Dança dos Famosos 3	Herself (reality show of Domingão do Faustão)
2006	O Profeta	Lia (Maria Luíza Ribeiro de Souza)
2007	Desejo Proibido	Dona Magnólia Cardoso Palhares
2009	Caminho das Índias	Kochi Meetha
2010	A Cura	Margarida Bevilláqua
2010	O Relógio da Aventura	Inês
2011	Insensato Coração	Carmem Pereira
2011	Aquele Beijo	Regina Collaboro
2012	Salve Jorge	Isaurinha (Isaura Alcântara Vieira)
2015	Além do Tempo	Zilda (1ª phase)/Zilda Ventura Santárem (2ª phase)
2016	Sol Nascente	Mirtes Calderon Texeira (Dona Mocinha)
2017	Segredos de Justiça	Ana Amélia
2017	Tempo de Amar	Henriqueta Ramos
2019	A Dona do Pedaço	Evelina Sobral Ramirez
2025	Êta Mundo Melhor!	Margarida
