= Selva de Pedra (1972 TV series) =

- Genre: Telenovela
- Created by: Janete Clair
- Directed by: Daniel Filho; Reynaldo Boury; Walter Avancini
- Starring: Regina Duarte; Francisco Cuoco; Dina Sfat; Carlos Eduardo Dolabella; Carlos Vereza; Gilberto Martinho; Arlete Salles; Mário Lago; Ana Ariel; Célia Coutinho; Heloísa Helena; Glória Pires
- Opening theme: "Selva de Pedra", Orquestra e Coral Som Livre
- Country of origin: Brazil
- Original language: Portuguese
- No. of episodes: 243 (original run)

Original release
- Network: TV Globo
- Release: 10 April 1972 – 23 January 1973

Related
- O Homem Que Deve Morrer; Cavalo de Aço; Selva de Pedra (1986)

Selva de Pedra is a Brazilian telenovela produced and broadcast by TV Globo. It premiered on 10 April 1972 and ended on 23 January 1973, with a total of 243 episodes in black and white. It is the eleventh "novela das oito" to be aired on the timeslot. It was created and written by Janete Clair, and directed by Daniel Filho, Reynaldo Boury and Walter Avancini.

== Plot ==
Cristiano Vilhena leads a simple, quiet life with few prospects in Campos dos Goytacazes, a town in the interior of Rio de Janeiro, and is forced to play the bass drum in the town square during the sermons of his father, Sebastião, a poor evangelical pastor. His family survives on the little money they earn by selling medals and artificial flowers during sermons, making Cristiano the target of mockery from the other boys. Cristiano ends up fighting with one of them, Gastão Neves, who pulls out a gun and, during the fight, ends up being the victim of his own weapon. The only witness to the incident is the young artist Simone Marques. Knowing that Cristiano is innocent, Simone covers up for him, sheltering him in her house. Later, they both leave town to live in the city of Rio de Janeiro, which at the time belonged to the state of Guanabara.

Cristiano and Simone fall in love and get married, going to live at the Pensão Palácio, owned by the cheerful Fanny, an ex-vedete. While Simone invests in her career as an artist, Cristiano becomes friends with the scoundrel Miro, a profiteer who encourages him to get in touch with his rich uncle, Aristides Vilhena. The two brothers received a shipyard, Celmu, as an inheritance from their father, and Sebastião, determined to become an evangelical preacher, donated his share to charity. While Aristides prospered as the owner of the shipyard, although he tried to help his brother, his help was always refused.

Miro and Cristiano fake a robbery outside a party, in which Aristides' wife Laura's necklace is stolen. Pretending to confront the robbers, Cristiano and Miro recover the jewel, earning the businessman's sympathy. Aristides, discovering that Cristiano is his nephew, hires him to work at the shipyard. Cristiano begins to excel at work and to frequent Aristides' house, strengthening ties with his uncle, his cousin Caio and his fiancée Fernanda.

Fernanda takes an interest in Cristiano and the two get involved, since Cristiano hides the fact that he is married from everyone. Knowing that Fernanda and Caio's engagement is going badly and is about to come to an end, Aristides welcomes the prospect of her marrying his nephew, as Fernanda owns 46% of the shares in the shipyard, and her husband would be the majority shareholder in the company. Increasingly confused and seduced by power, Cristiano even puts his happiness at risk by breaking off his marriage to Simone, without knowing that she is pregnant. Disappointed, Simone leaves him at the boarding house and moves into the house she uses as a studio in Petrópolis.

Miro sees Simone as the main obstacle to Cristiano's rise and, consequently, his own, and suggests that he should eliminate her. Cristiano is revolted by the proposal and the two fight. While Cristiano leaves determined to ask Simone for forgiveness and ready to give up his job at the shipyard, Miro sends a letter to his friend at her studio, in which he claims that Cristiano intends to kill his own wife.

After deciding to talk to Cristiano in person, Simone reads the letter and comes to believe that Cristiano is planning her murder. Desperate, she runs away with the housekeeper, Madalena. Just then, Miro arrives in a cab and, believing that Cristiano is running away from him with Simone, begins a chase. During the chase, Simone's car overturns on the road, catches fire and explodes. Madalena dies and Simone escapes alive, but loses the baby. Simone lets everyone believe she is dead and leaves the country.

Cristiano, feeling responsible for his wife's death, abandons Fernanda at the altar. Humiliated, she obsessively pursues Cristiano, seeking revenge. Aristides dies and leaves most of his shares to his nephew, who becomes president of the shipyard. Fernanda re-engages to Caio and her first move is to commission Cristiano to deliver a ship. During the process, she tries to hinder the project in every way, even enlisting the help of Miro to rob the shipyard.

After making a name for herself as an artist in France, Simone returns to Brazil under the identity of Rosana Reis, her supposed twin sister. Cristiano recognizes her, but she refuses to reveal her identity. Simone is called to testify by the delegate responsible for investigating the disappearance of Madalena, the maid who was in the car with her on the day of the accident. Confronted by the maid's parents and an eyewitness to the disaster, she admits to having taken advantage of the event to forge a new identity, and posts bail for the crime of ideological falsehood, answering the trial for Madalena's death.

Cristiano tries several times to prove his innocence to Simone, but she rejects him, saying that she wants to live exclusively for her art. Although she still loves him, she can't convince herself that he didn't plan her death. Fernanda, who approached Simone when she still thought she was Rosana Reis, contributes to this attitude, encouraging the sculptor to despise her ex-husband. Simone's father, Francisco, doesn't like Cristiano either.

When Cristiano and Simone finally understand each other and reaffirm their love for each other, the parents of the young man who died during the fight with Cristiano reappear and press charges against the businessman, who is arrested and taken to court to stand trial. Instructed by the defense lawyer and Caio, Simone and Cristiano pretend to remain separated and hate each other. This way, on the day of the trial, Simone's testimony would gain more credibility to prove her husband's innocence. Francisco, Simone's father, is dismayed at the prospect of Cristiano and his daughter getting back together, and reveals the truth about the ruse to Fernanda.

=== Plot ending ===
Fernanda, increasingly obsessed with getting revenge on Cristiano, and showing clear signs of her mental imbalance, kidnaps Simone and imprisons her in an abandoned house that belonged to her grandfather, whose address everyone doesn't know. She, imitating Simone's voice, calls Cristiano's lawyer and tells him that she has given up testifying for him in the trial. Cristiano is in despair, but despite Simone's absence, the testimony in his favor is good enough for the lawyer to get his imprisonment relaxed and Cristiano is free to await the judge's ruling. Deeply disappointed, he believes that his wife has left him for good and begins to fall into a state of decadence, losing his way in business and accumulating debts. The deadline for the delivery of Fernanda's ship passes, he is unable to finish the work and Caio takes over as president of the company.

Simone remains Fernanda's prisoner for two months. On the day of Cristiano's trial, her whereabouts are finally discovered by Caio, who is going to the house accompanied by the police and finds Fernanda, completely insane, dressed in a bridal veil and uttering disconnected phrases in the garden of the house. Simone is found gagged and tied to a bed, very pale and almost powerless, having to be taken by wheelchair to the court in time to give her testimony about Cristiano's innocence. To her testimony was added, at the last minute, the voice of businessman José Neves, the dead young man's father, confirming that the murder weapon belonged to his son, and Cristiano was declared innocent. After Simone's kidnapping, Fernanda ends up in a psychiatric hospital, waiting to marry Cristiano. Caio, as a way of compensating his cousin for the inconvenience caused by Fernanda, gives Cristiano one of the ships from the shipyard so that he can start life anew. In the final scene, Cristiano and Simone hug and kiss on the deck of the ship.

== Production ==
Janete Clair was inspired by Theodore Dreiser's novel An American Tragedy, which also served as a reference for RecordTV's soap opera Seu Único Pecado in 1969. Selva de Pedra was the last in a series of four soap operas that the author wrote for Rede Globo's prime time slot between 1969 and 1973, without interruption: Véu de Noiva, Irmãos Coragem (the network's second longest-running soap opera) and O Homem Que Deve Morrer, all of which were hugely successful, demonstrating the extent of the author's ability to develop her plots and her dedication to her work.

The recordings were in black and white. Daniel Filho was in charge of the production until chapter 20, when he handed over the direction to Reynaldo Boury who, in turn, was replaced from chapter 90 onwards by Walter Avancini, who was making his Globo debut.

It also marked the Globo debut of Glória Pires - eight years old at the time - and also of actor Kadu Moliterno.

The Federal Censorship ordered author Janete Clair to modify the plot and end the romance between the characters Cristiano (Francisco Cuoco) and Fernanda (Dina Sfat). The reason was that this union constituted bigamy on Cristiano's part, since he wasn't a widower as he thought. Despite arguing that the characters in the plot didn't know Simone was alive, the censors countered by saying that the public did know she was alive.

Around 400 Quadruplex videotapes were used to record and edit the 243 chapters, which were reused due to their high cost at the time. In the broadcaster's archives, a compact of 76 chapters would have remained, shown in its first rerun at 8pm in 1975 - when the lost 1st version of Roque Santeiro was censored by the Military Regime at the time.

== Cast ==
| Actor | Character |
|---|---|
| Regina Duarte | Simone Marques / Rosana Reis |
| Francisco Cuoco | Cristiano Vilhena |
| Dina Sfat | Fernanda Arruda Campos |
| Carlos Vereza | Miro (Argemiro Tavares) |
| Carlos Eduardo Dolabella | Caio Vilhena |
| Gilberto Martinho | Aristides Vilhena (Tide) |
| Arlete Salles | Laura Vilhena |
| Mário Lago | Sebastião Vilhena (Sessé) |
| Ana Ariel | Berenice |
| Edney Giovenazzi | Jorge Moreno |
| Heloísa Helena | Fanny Marlene |
| Dorinha Duval | Diva |
| Álvaro Aguiar | Mestre Pedro |
| Arnaldo Weiss | Seu Chico (Francisco Marques) |
| Célia Coutinho | Cíntia Vilhena |
| Emiliano Queiroz | Marcelo |
| Lídia Mattos | Vivian Arruda (Viví) |
| Neuza Amaral | Walkíria Moreno |
| Sônia Braga | Flávia Moreno |
| João Paulo Adour | Guido |
| Ângela Leal | Joana / Jane |
| Ida Gomes | Madame Heloise Katzuki |
| Maria Cláudia | Kátia |
| Hildegard Angel | Beatriz |
| Rogério Fróes | Roger Martin |
| Suzana Faini | Olga |
| Tessy Callado | Zelinha |
| Antônio Ganzarolli | Pipoca |
| Agnes Fontoura | Irene |
| José Steinberg | Isaac |
| Germano Filho | Abud |
| Glória Pires | Fátima |
| Louise Macedo | Clarisse |
| Francisco Dantas | José Neves |
| Jurema Penna | Sofia |
| Roberto Bomfim | Zé (José Ambrósio) |
| Francisco Milani | Hélio Sales |
| Lícia Magna | Maria Amélia Arruda |
| Newton Martins | Padre Jaime |
| Léa Garcia | Elza |
| Denise Emmer | Monique |
| Buza Ferraz | Junior |
| Carlos Eduardo | Oswaldo |
| Luiz Armando Queiroz | Beto |
| Mary Daniel | Dona Otávia |
| Antônio Victor | Bartolomeu (Bartô) |
| Lourdinha Bittencourt | Nina |
| Isaac Bardavid | State prosecutor |
| Rogério Pitanga | Tico |
| Marcos Waimberg | César |
| Samantha Rainbow | Lúcia Rangel |
| Fábio Massimo | Mirinho |
| Jorge Caldas | Gastão Neves |
| Tamara Taxman | Lena (Madalena Ribeiro) |
| Tony Ferreira | Delegado Lima |
| Urbano Lóes | Dr. Feliciano D'Avilla |
