= O Primeiro Amor =

- Genre: Telenovela
- Created by: Walter Negrão
- Directed by: Régis Cardoso; Walter Campos
- Starring: Sérgio Cardoso; Leonardo Villar; Rosamaria Murtinho; Aracy Balabanian; Tônia Carrero; Paulo José; Flávio Migliaccio
- Opening theme: "O Primeiro Amor" by Quarteto Forma
- Country of origin: Brazil
- Original language: Portuguese
- No. of episodes: 227

Production
- Running time: 45 minutes

Original release
- Network: TV Globo
- Release: 24 January – 20 October 1972

Related
- Minha Doce Namorada; Uma Rosa com Amor; Mi primer amor (1973)

O Primeiro Amor is a Brazilian telenovela produced and broadcast by TV Globo. It premiered on 24 January 1972 and ended on 20 October 1972, with a total of 227 episodes. It is the tenth "novela das sete" to be aired at the timeslot. It was created by Walter Negrão and directed by Régis Cardoso with Walter Campos.

== Cast ==
Actor	Character
Sérgio Cardoso	Professor Luciano Lima
Leonardo Villar	Professor Luciano Lima
Rosamaria Murtinho	Paula
Aracy Balabanian	Giovana
Tônia Carrero	Professora Maria do Carmo
Paulo José	Shazan
Flávio Migliaccio	Xerife
Suzana Gonçalves	Bárbara Lima (Babi)
Marco Nanini	Rui Lima
Nívea Maria	Helena
Marcos Paulo	Rafael (Rafa)
Renata Sorrah	Mariana
Roberto Pirillo	Hélio
Elza Gomes	Dona Júlia
Sadi Cabral	Seu Quim
Zezé Macedo	Astúria
Macedo Neto	Euclides
Célia Biar	Olga
Jardel Mello	Professor Silas
Regina Macedo	Zeni do Cartório
Murilo Nery	Vicente
Darcy de Souza	Professora Aracy
Dary Reis	Dr. Matheus
Patrícia Bueno	Sílvia
Ênio Carvalho	Léo
Djenane Machado	Glória (Glorinha)
Reinaldo Gonzaga	Professor Maurício
Angelo Antônio	Moby Dick
Rosana Garcia	Zilda Lima (Zizi)
Herivelto Martins Filho	Luciano Lima Júnior (Júnior)
