= Helena (Brazilian TV series) =

- Genre: Drama; Romance
- Created by: Gilberto Braga
- Based on: Helena by Machado de Assis
- Directed by: Herval Rossano
- Starring: Lúcia Alves; Osmar Prado; José Augusto Branco; Ângela Valério; Ida Gomes
- Opening theme: Helena (instrumental) by Julio Medaglia and Paulo Ribeiro
- Country of origin: Brazil
- Original language: Portuguese
- No. of episodes: 20

Production
- Running time: 30 minutes

Original release
- Network: TV Globo
- Release: 5 May – 30 May 1975

Helena is a Brazilian telenovela, produced and broadcast by TV Globo between 5 May and 30 May 1975, running for twenty episodes. It succeeded A Patota and was preceded by O Noviço, being the fourth 6 pm telenovela broadcast by TV Globo.

Created by Gilberto Braga, it was based on the homonymous novel by Machado de Assis, and was directed by Herval Rossano.

It starred Lúcia Alves, Osmar Prado, Rogério Fróes, Carlos Duval and Ida Gomes.

== Cast ==
Actor/Actress	Character
Lúcia Alves	Helena
Osmar Prado	Estácio do Vale
José Augusto Branco	Luiz Mendonça
Rogério Fróes	Dr. Camargo
Carlos Duval	Priest Melchior
Ângela Valério	Eugênia Camargo
Ida Gomes	Úrsula do Vale
Regina Vianna	Tomásia Camargo
Gilberto Sálvio	Salvador
Sidney Marques	Vicente
Ruth de Souza	Madalena
Vanda Matos	Antônia
Aguinaldo Rocha	Tabelião
Durval Pereira	Conselheiro Vale
Paulo César Pereio	Narrador
Vicente Cosme	Errand boy

== Production ==
Helena, along with O Noviço (which succeeded it) were the first mini telenovelas, named that on the time, for being written for 20 episodes, premiering the 6 pm timeslot and adaptations of Brazilian literature. The entire telenovela was recorded in 12 days.

The character Helena was gonna be cast to Bete Mendes, which would do a romantic pair with Osmar Prado (Estácio), but the creator Gilberto Braga was cast in his next production, Bravo!, created along with Janete Clair, in which Bete portrayed Lia Di Lorenzo. Lúcia Alves, which was chosen to replace Bete on the place of Helena, initially was cast as Eugênia, a character which was ultimately portrayed by Ângela Valério.

The external scenes, e.g. Helena and Estácio riding on horses, were recorded on the Palmares Farm, in Santa Cruz, Rio de Janeiro. During the recording of an external scene, actress Lúcia Alves fell and sprained her ankle, almost needing to be sidelined.

The sets and costumes were the responsibility of set designer Arlindo Rodrigues, who at the time was the carnival of the Rio de Janeiro samba school Mocidade Independente de Padre Miguel.

== Streaming ==
It was added to Globoplay in 17 March 2025, through Projeto Fragmentos, which tries to restore incomplete works whose episodes were lost in fires or in the process of replacing physical media due to economic reasons. Four episodes were preserved: 01, 11, 19 and 20.
