= Rosa Rebelde =

- Genre: Telenovela
- Created by: Janete Clair
- Directed by: Daniel Filho
- Starring: Glória Menezes; Tarcísio Meira
- Country of origin: Brazil
- Original language: Portuguese
- No. of episodes: 236

Original release
- Network: TV Globo
- Release: 15 January – 13 October 1969

Related
- Passo dos Ventos; Véu de Noiva

Rosa Rebelde is a Brazilian telenovela which was produced and broadcast by TV Globo. It premiered on 15 January 1969 and ended on 13 October 1969. It is the seventh "novela das oito" to be aired on the timeslot. It was created and written by Janete Clair, and directed by Daniel Filho. It was based on a radionovela, Rosa Malena, created by Janete Clair in collaboration with Radio Nacional.

== Cast ==
- Glória Menezes as Rosa Malena
- Tarcísio Meira as Captain Sandro
- Djenane Machado as Conchita
- Ênio Santos as José de Aragón
- Gracinda Freire as Rafaela
- José Augusto Branco as Pierre Duprat
- Maria Pompeu as Soledad Navarro
- Mário Lago as Barão de San Juan de la Cruz
- Miguel Carrano as Manolo
- Miriam Pires Baronesa as Inês de la Torre
- Moacyr Deriquém as Napoleão Bonaparte
- Myriam Pérsia as Maria Consuelo
- Paulo Araújo as Felipe Grandet
- Ribeiro Fortes as El Sordoa
- Sônia Ferrera as La Zíngara
- Suzana de Moraes as Lola
