= Passo dos Ventos =

1968 Brazilian telenovela

- Genre: Telenovela
- Created by: Janete Clair
- Directed by: Régis Cardoso
- Starring: Glória Menezes
- Country of origin: Brazil
- Original language: Portuguese
- No. of episodes: 177

Original release
- Network: TV Globo
- Release: 28 June 1968 – 14 January 1969

Related
- Sangue e Areia; Rosa Rebelde

Passo dos Ventos is a Brazilian telenovela produced and broadcast by TV Globo. It premiered on 28 June 1968 and ended on 14 January 1969. It was the sixth "novela das oito" to be aired in the timeslot. It is written by Janete Clair and directed by Régis Cardoso.

== Cast ==
- Glória Menezes as Vivien Chevalier
- Carlos Alberto as André Christophe
- Jorge Coutinho as Bienaire
- Djenane Machado as Hannah
- Theresa Amayo as Lien
- Joana Fomm as Linda
- Mário Lago as Jean Dubois
- Glauce Rocha as Bárbara
