= Suave Veneno =

Brazilian telenovela

- Genre: Telenovela
- Created by: Aguinaldo Silva
- Developed by: Ângela Carneiro, Maria Helena Nascimento, Felipe Miguez, Fernando Rebello and Marilia García
- Written by: Aguinaldo Silva
- Directed by: Daniel Filho, Marcos Schechtman, Alexandre Avancini and Moacyr Góes
- Starring: José Wilker; Glória Pires; Irene Ravache; Letícia Spiller; Patrícia França; Ângelo Antônio; Tarcísio Filho; Betty Faria; Rodrigo Santoro; Vanessa Lóes; Luana Piovani; Diogo Vilela; Kadu Moliterno; Nívea Maria; Deborah Secco
- Theme music composer: Riccardo Waddington, Daniel Filho
- Country of origin: Brazil
- Original language: Portuguese
- No. of seasons: 1
- No. of episodes: 209

Production
- Production company: Central Globo de Produção

Original release
- Network: Rede Globo
- Release: January 18 – September 18, 1999

Related
- Torre de Babel; Terra Nostra

Suave Veneno (English title: Mild Poison) is a Brazilian telenovela produced and aired on TV Globo from January 18 to September 18, 1999, at 8 pm, with a total of 209 chapters.

It was written by Aguinaldo Silva with the help of Angela Carneiro, Maria Helena Nascimento, Felipe Miguez, Fernando Rebello and Marilia Garcia. The telenovela was directed by Marcos Schechtman, Alexandre Avancini and Moacyr Góes with the general direction of Ricardo Waddington, Marcos Schechtman and core Ricardo Waddington and Daniel Filho.

It was played by TV Globo International in 2007 with a total of 140 chapters. There were 130 episodes of the version shown on Portuguese television.

Featured José Wilker, Glória Pires, Irene Ravache, Letícia Spiller, Patrícia França, Ângelo Antônio, Luana Piovani, Tarcísio Filho, Vanessa Lóes, Nívea Maria, Betty Faria and Rodrigo Santoro in lead roles in the plot.

== Plot ==
The businessman Valdomiro Cerqueira hits a young woman named Inês with his car, causing her to lose her memory. Valdomiro is in debt to the girl, who is alone and can't remember her past, and takes her to live in his house until the situation is stabilized. His family receives her coldly and with suspicion: his wife, Eleonor, and their three daughters, Maria Regina, Maria Antonia, and Márcia Eduarda. And what they feared ends up happening: Valdomiro's involvement with Inês causes his separation from Eleonor and the fury of Maria Regina, who sees Inês as an intruder and a threat to the family fortune. Maria Regina clashes with her father in a bitter struggle for power at “Marmoreal", a company founded and chaired by Valdomiro.

== Cast ==
Actor/Actriz	Person
José Wilker	Waldomiro Cerqueira
Glória Pires	Maria Inês/ Lavínia de Alencar Cerqueira
Irene Ravache	Eleonor Bergantes de Cerqueira
Letícia Spiller	Maria Regina Bergantes de Cerqueira e Figueira
Rodrigo Santoro	Eliseu Vieira
Patrícia França	Clarisse Ribeiro
Ângelo Antônio	Adelmo de Alencar
Tarcísio Filho	Augusto Ivan
Kadu Moliterno	Álvaro Figueira
Luana Piovani	Marcia Eduarda Bergantes de Cerqueira
Betty Faria	Carlota Valdez
Diogo Vilela	Uálber Canhedo
Nívea Maria	Emiliana (Nana)
Léa Garcia	Selma Ribeiro
Nuno Leal Maia	Felisberto Morel (Gato)
Vanessa Lóes	Maria Antonia Bergantes de Cerqueira Coelho
Deborah Secco	Marina Canhedo
Ilva Niño	Maria José da Silva (Zezé)
Mariah da Penha	Lucilene Barbosa da Silva
Sérgio Viotti	Alceste Bergantes
Jorge Dória	Genival Canhedo
Eva Todor	Maria do Carmo Canhedo
Nelson Xavier	Fortunato
Ana Rosa	Geni (Geninha)
Fúlvio Stefanini	Marcelo Barone
Rodrigo Faro	Renildo
Nívea Stelmann	Eliete
Luiz Carlos Tourinho	Edilberto
Totia Meireles	Matilde
Heitor Martinez	Claudionor
Samara Felippo	Gilvânia
Matheus Rocha	Leonardo
Daniela Faria	Adriana
Cecília Dassi	Patrícia Cerqueira Figueira (Patty)
Vinícius de Oliveira	Júnior
Ivan Cândido	Sandoval
Elias Andreato	Clóvis
Tuca Andrada	Antônio
Guilherme Corrêa	Heitor
Tácito Rocha	Dr. Faria
Luís Antônio Pillar	Dr. Cláudio

== Awards and nominations ==
Troféu Imprensa

- Best Telenovela – Nomination
- Best Actress – Letícia Spiller – Nomination

Prêmio Extra de Televisão

- Best Actress – Letícia Spiller
- Revelation of the Year – Luiz Carlos Tourinho
