= The Heirs (1969 film) =

1969 drama film

- Directed by: Carlos Diegues
- Screenplay by: Carlos Diegues
- Produced by: Jarbas Barbosa; Carlos Diegues
- Starring: Sérgio Cardoso; Odete Lara; Mário Lago; Paulo Porto; Isabel Ribeiro
- Cinematography: Dib Lutfi
- Edited by: Eduardo Escorel
- Release date: 1969
- Country: Brazil
- Language: Portuguese

The Heirs (Portuguese: Os Herdeiros), also known as The Inheritors, is a 1969 Brazilian drama film written and directed by Carlos Diegues. It premiered at the 30th Venice International Film Festival.

== Cast ==
- Sérgio Cardoso as Jorge Ramos
- Mário Lago as Almeida
- Paulo Porto as Medeiros
- Odete Lara as Eugênia
- Isabel Ribeiro as Rachel
- Jean-Pierre Léaud as Danton
- André Gouveia as Joaquim
- Grande Otelo as Américo
- Daniel Filho as the American man
- Wilza Carla as the American woman
- Hugo Carvana as Professor Maia
- Renato Coutinho as Prado
- Ferreira Gullar as Davi Martins
- Oswaldo Loureiro as Barros
- Maria Ribeiro as Teresa
- Anecy Rocha as Baby
- Dalva de Oliveira as a singer
- Caetano Veloso as a friend
- Nara Leão as a friend

== Production ==
The film was shot between late 1968 and 1969. Its initial title was O brado retumbante ('The resounding cry'), but was changed at the request of the censorship authorities. The film portays life events of politician Getúlio Vargas through the lens of a bourgeois family, and spans a broad period of Brazilian political history, from Vargas' rise to power in 1930 through the 1950s up to the 1964 military coup.

== Release ==
The film had its premiere at the 30th Venice International Film Festival. It was released in Brazil in 1970, after facing issues with censorship and undergoing several cuts that according to Diegues altered its structure and the film more difficult for audiences to understand.

== Reception ==
A contemporary Variety review described it as "a brilliantly honed film" that "analyzes its country in potent pic form that could find echoes everywhere in spite of its mainly local allusions." In a retrospective analysis, Randal Johnson described the film as "a mural of Brazilian political and cultural history" that uses a "collage of many different styles", in a "strikingly original manner that does indeed combine Brecht and Shakespeare, Godard and Maria Bethânia".
