= Mário Lago =

Brazilian actor, poet and singer (1911–2002)

Mário Lago OMC
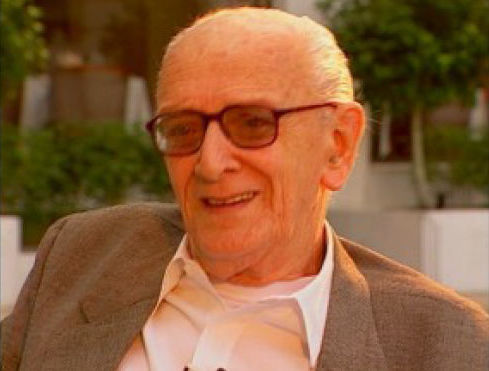
- Born: 26 November 1911; Rio de Janeiro, Brazil
- Died: 30 May 2002 (aged 90); Rio de Janeiro
- Occupations: Composer, actor, radio presenter, poet, lawyer
- Years active: 1934–2002

Mário Lago OMC ( November 26, 1911 – May 30, 2002) was a Brazilian lawyer, poet, radio broadcaster, composer, actor and singer.

In the 1940s and 1950s he was known for composing popular samba songs, such as "Ai! que saudade da Amélia" and "Atire a primeira pedra", both in partnership with Ataulfo Alves.

== Biography ==
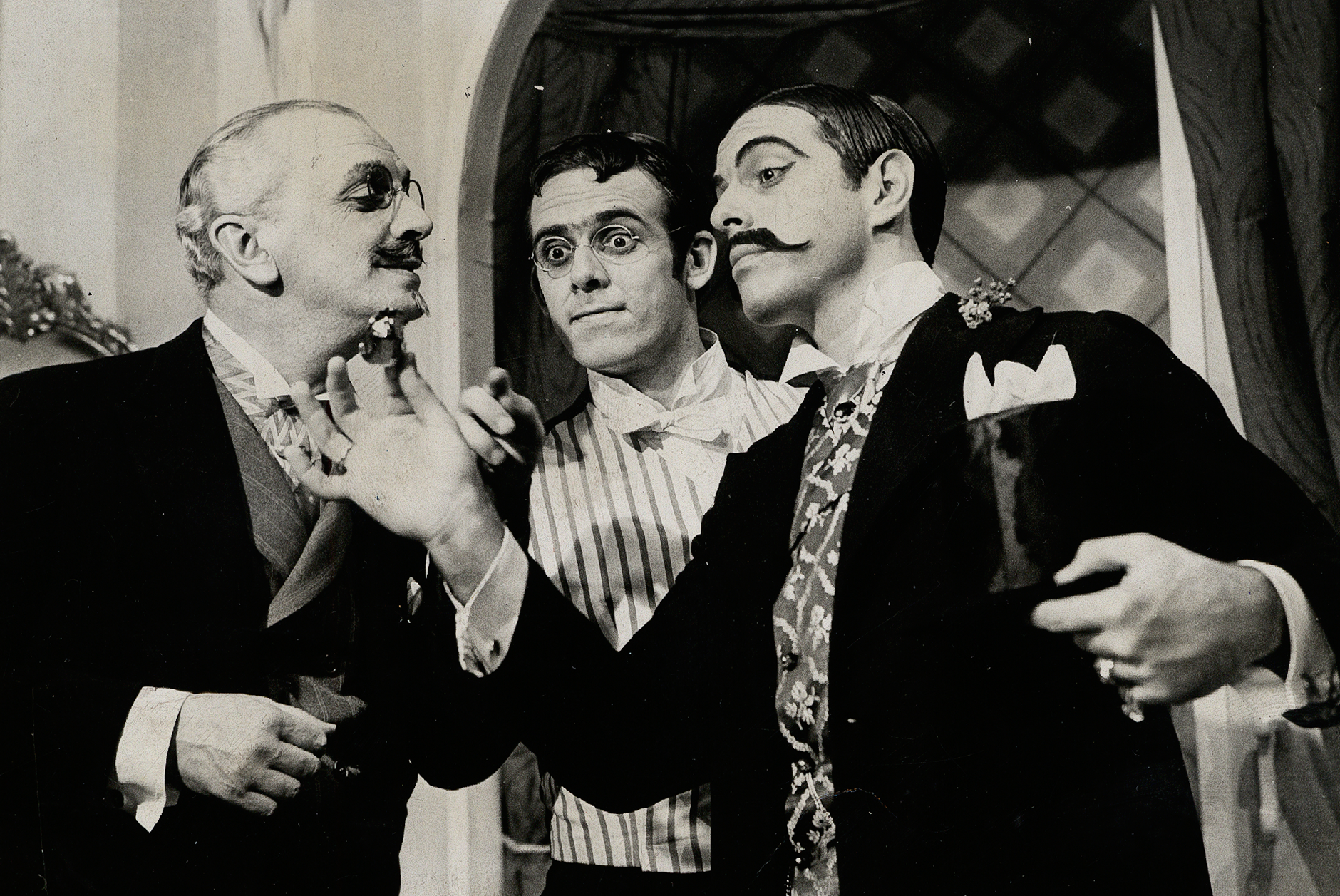
Mário Lago, Francisco Cuoco and Oswaldo Loureiro, in 1960, in the set of Georges Feydeau's play A Flea in Her Ear

Lago was born in Rio de Janeiro, son of the maestro Antônio Lago and Francisca Maria Vicencia Croccia Lago, and grandson of the Italian anarchist and musician Giuseppe Croccia.

He graduated in Law the Universidade do Brasil, in 1933, getting involved in political activism, and joining the Brazilian Communist Party, PCB. After graduation, Lago worked briefly as a lawyer.

Because of his political beliefs, Lago was imprisoned seven times – in 1932, 1941, 1946, 1949, 1952, 1964 and 1969.

He married Zeli, daughter of the communist militant Henrique Cordeiro, until her death in 1997. The couple had five children: Antônio Henrique, Graça Maria, Mário Lago Filho, Luís Carlos (named after Luís Carlos Prestes) and Vanda. He was a supporter of Fluminense Football Club.

== Artistic career ==
Lago started writing poetry at 15 years old, publishing a poem in the magazine "Fon-Fon". He wrote revue plays and songs from 1933 to 1958, also acting in stage and radio plays, invited by fellow actor Joracy Camargo. With Braguinha, he wrote the screenplay for the 1939 film Banana da Terra, starring Carmen Miranda.

The first song he wrote was "Menina, eu sei de uma coisa", in partnership with Custódio Mesquita, recorded in 1935 by Mário Reis. Three years later, Orlando Silva recorded Mario's song "Nada além". His best known works were "Ai! que saudade da Amélia", "Atire a primeira pedra", in partnership with Ataulfo Alves; "É tão gostoso, seu moço", with Chocolate, "Número um", with Benedito Lacerda, the samba "Fracasso" and the carnival song "Aurora", with Roberto Roberti, recorded by Carmen Miranda.

In "Ai! que saudade da Amélia", the description of an idealized woman became so popular that "Amélia" became a synonym in Brazil for a submissive, resigned woman dedicated to housework.

Lago played in more than 30 films, among them The Priest and the Girl, Entranced Earth, Os Herdeiros and S. Bernardo. He also acted in several telenovelas, most of them on TV Globo, including O Sheik de Agadir, Cavalo de Aço, O Casarão, and Dancing Days.

In 1989 Lago joined the Partido dos Trabalhadores, supporting Luiz Inácio Lula da Silva's presidential campaigns in 1989 and 1998.

== Death ==
He died on 30 May 2002, aged 90, at his house in Rio de Janeiro South Zone. His funeral was on Teatro João Caetano, where he spent most of his career as an actor. Since his death, the theater of Colégio Pedro II is named as Teatro Mário Lago. He was buried in Cemitério de São João Batista, in Rio de Janeiro.

In 2001, in his honor the TV Globo program Domingão do Faustão created the Troféu Mário Lago, awarded to the best telenovela actor or actress.

== Filmography ==
=== Television ===
Year	Title	Character	TV Channel
1963	Nuvem de Fogo	-	-
1966	O Sheik de Agadir	Otto Von Lucker	Rede Globo
1967	A Sombra de Rebecca	Tamura	Rede Globo
1967	Presídio de Mulheres	Autor Principal	Rede Tupi
1967	O Homem Proibido	Ali Yabor	Rede Globo
1968	Passo dos Ventos	Jean Dubois	Rede Globo
1969	A Ponte dos Suspiros	Foscari	Rede Globo
1969	Rosa Rebelde	Barão de San Juan de La Cruz	Rede Globo
1970	Verão Vermelho	Bruno Vilela (Nonô)	Rede Globo
1971	Assim na Terra como no Céu	Carlos Eduardo de Oliveira Ramos	Rede Globo
1971	Minha Doce Namorada	César Leão	Rede Globo
1972	Selva de Pedra	Sebastião Vilhena (Sessé)	Rede Globo
1973	Cavalo de Aço	Inácio Barros	Rede Globo
1974	O Espigão	Gabriel Martins	Rede Globo
1975	Cuca Legal	Aureliano Villaça	Rede Globo
1975	Escalada	Belmiro Silva	Rede Globo
1975	Pecado Capital	Adalberto Peres (Dr. Peres)	Rede Globo
1976	O Casarão	Atílio de Sousa	Rede Globo
1977	Nina	Antônio Torres Galba	Rede Globo
1978	Dancin' Days	Alberico Santos	Rede Globo
1979	Os Gigantes	Antônio Lucas	Rede Globo
1980	Plumas e Paetês	Cristiano Mendes	Rede Globo
1981	Baila Comigo	Oswaldir Junqueira	Rede Globo
1981	Brilhante	Vítor Newman	Rede Globo
1982	Elas por Elas	Miguel Aranha	Rede Globo
1983	Guerra dos Sexos	Elizeu Giácomo (Juiz Elizeu)	Rede Globo
1983	Louco Amor	Agenor Rocha	Rede Globo
1984	Padre Cícero	Núncio Apostólico	Rede Globo
1984	Partido Alto	Adamastor de Castro	Rede Globo
1985	Grande Sertão: Veredas	Compadre Quelemem	Rede Globo
1985	O Tempo e o Vento	Padre Lara	Rede Globo
1985	Tenda dos Milagres	João Reis (Juiz João)	Rede Globo
1985	Um Sonho a Mais	Guilhermo Del Blanco (Médico Blanco)	Rede Globo
1986	Cambalacho	Antero Souza e Silva	Rede Globo
1986	Roda de Fogo	Antônio Villar	Rede Globo
1988	O Pagador de Promessas	Dom Germano	Rede Globo
1989	O Salvador da Pátria	Joaquim Xavier (Quinzote)	Rede Globo
1990	Barriga de Aluguel	Dr. Molina	Rede Globo
1991	Vamp	Jeremias Guimarães	Rede Globo
1992	Perigosas Peruas	Don Garcia	Rede Globo
1992	De Corpo e Alma	Getúlio Veiga (Desembargador Veiga)	Rede Globo
1992	Despedida de Solteiro	Otacílio de Deus (Padre Otacílio)	Rede Globo
1992	Você Decide	Several characters (12 Episodes) /1992-1999	Rede Globo
1993	Agosto	Aniceto	Rede Globo
1993	Fera Ferida	Bernardo Prestes (Juiz de Paz)	Rede Globo
1993	Retrato de Mulher	Special End of Year Episode	Rede Globo
1994	Quatro por Quatro	Henrique Pessoa	Rede Globo
1995	Engraçadinha: Seus Amores e Seus Pecados	Osmar Farto (Reitor Osmar)	Rede Globo
1995	Explode Coração	Sebastian Flitz	Rede Globo
1995	História de Amor	Professor Medina	Rede Globo
1996	O Fim do Mundo	Frei Luiz	Rede Globo
1996	Quem É Você?	Aníbal Machado	Rede Globo
1998	Hilda Furacão	Olavo	Rede Globo
1998	Pecado Capital	Dr. Amatto	Rede Globo
1998	Torre de Babel	João Luiz (Padre João)	Rede Globo
1999	Força de um Desejo	Dr. Teodoro	Rede Globo
2000	Brava Gente	Eleutério (Episode: "Enquanto a Noite Não Chega")	Rede Globo
2001	O Clone	Dr. Molina	Rede Globo

=== Cinema ===
Year	Títle
1947	Asas do Brasil
1947	O Homem que Chutou a Consciência
1948	Terra Violenta
1948	Uma Luz na Estrada
1949	O Homem que Passa
1950	A Sombra da Outra
1952	Pecadora Imaculada
1953	Balança Mas Não Cai
1957	Papai Fanfarrão
1959	Mulheres, Cheguei!
1962	Assalto ao Trem Pagador
1962	Assassinato em Copacabana
1965	História de um Crápula
1966	Na Onda do Iê-iê-iê
1966	O Padre e a Moça
1966	Cuidado, Espião Brasileiro em Ação
1966	Essa Gatinha é Minha
1967	Na Mira do Assassino
1967	Terra em Transe
1968	A Vida Provisória
1968	Desesperato
1968	Massacre no Supermercado
1969	Incrível, Fantástico, Extraordinário
1969	Pedro Diabo Ama Rosa Meia-Noite
1969	Tempo de Violência
1969	O Bravo Guerreiro
1969	The Heirs
1970	Badalada dos Infiéis
1971	S. Bernardo
1973	Café na Cama
1977	Lá Menor
1978	O Velho Gregório
1983	Idolatrada
