= A Patota =

- Created by: Maria Clara Machado
- Directed by: Reynaldo Boury
- Starring: Débora Duarte; Mário Gomes; Marco Nanini; Lúcia Alves
- Opening theme: A Patota by The Clowns
- Ending theme: A Patota by The Clowns
- Country of origin: Brazil
- Original language: Portuguese
- No. of episodes: 101

Production
- Running time: 50 minutes

Original release
- Network: TV Globo
- Release: 27 November 1972 – 29 March 1973

A Patota is a Brazilian telenovela produced and broadcast by TV Globo between 27 November 1972 and 29 March 1973, running for 101 episodes. It succeeded Bicho do Mato and was preceded by Helena, being the third 6 PM telenovela broadcast by TV Globo.

It was the only telenovela created by Maria Clara Machado. It was directed by Reynaldo Boury and produced in black and white.

Similarly to a large part of programs produced before 1975 by TV Globo, it was completely lost in a fire which affected TV Globo's collection in 1976, and only teasers and behind-the-scenes images survive.

== Synopsis ==
A Patota is a group of children formed by Juliana (Rosana Garcia), Pedro (Córis Júnior), Vicente (Fábio Mássimo) and Tião (José Prata), which live on the same town but have a dream to traveling to Africa. África. Neli (Débora Duarte), the teacher of the children, along with her husband, Jorge (Mário Gomes), encourage the children to reach this dream.
