= A Sombra de Rebecca =

- Genre: Telenovela
- Created by: Glória Magadan
- Directed by: Henrique Martins
- Starring: Carlos Alberto; Neuza Amaral
- Opening theme: "A Sombra de Rebecca" by Lyrio Panicali
- Country of origin: Brazil
- Original language: Portuguese
- No. of episodes: 90

Original release
- Network: TV Globo
- Release: 21 February – 23 June 1967

A Sombra de Rebecca is a Brazilian telenovela produced and broadcast by TV Globo. It premiered on 21 February 1967 and ended on 23 June 1967, with a total of 90 episodes. It's the third "novela das oito" to be aired on the timeslot.

It is written by Glória Magadan, based on the opera Madama Butterfly.

== Cast ==
Actor	Character
Neuza Amaral	Rebecca
Carlos Alberto	Sir Philip
Yoná Magalhães	Suzuki
Mário Lago	Tamura
Miriam Pires	Miss Leila
Norma Bengell	Diana
Ênio Santos	Koburi
Darcy de Souza	Norma
Emiliano Queiroz	Thomaz
Luiz Orioni	Percy Harrison
Gracinda Freire	Milenne
Márcia de Windsor	Josui
Álvaro Aguiar	Jair
Antônio Dresjan	Carlinhos
