= Tarcísio Meira =

Brazilian actor (1935–2021)

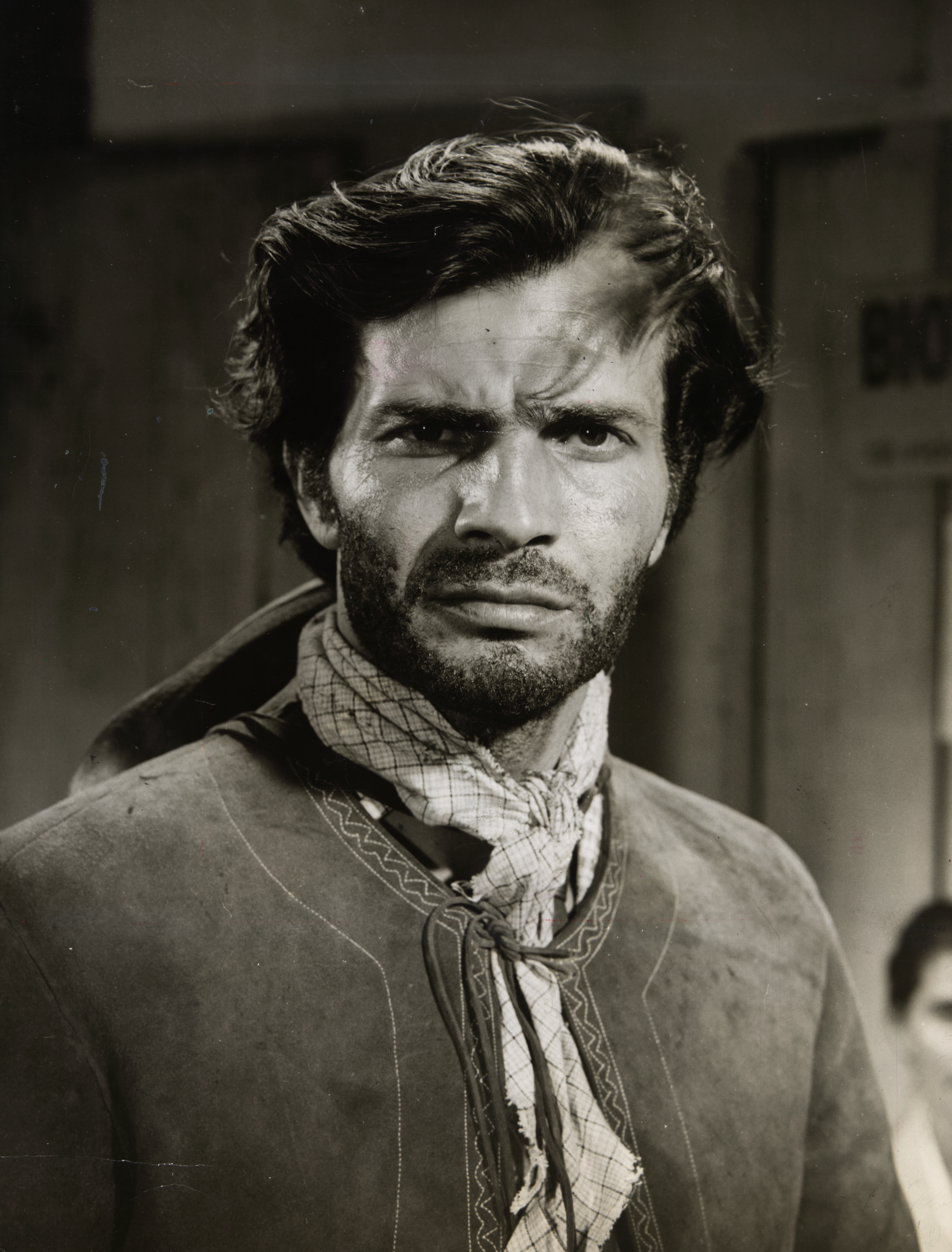
- Meira in the telenovela Irmãos Coragem (1970)
- Born: Tarcísio Pereira de Magalhães Sobrinho; 5 October 1935; São Paulo, Brazil
- Died: 12 August 2021 (aged 85); São Paulo, Brazil
- Occupation: Actor
- Years active: 1957–2020
- Spouse: Glória Menezes (m. 1962)
- Children: Tarcísio Filho

Tarcísio Pereira de Magalhães Sobrinho (5 October 1935 – 12 August 2021), known professionally as Tarcísio Meira, was a Brazilian actor.

He was one of the first actors to work for TV Globo. He was born in São Paulo and was the longtime owner of Fazenda São Marcos, a 5000 ha cattle ranch in the eastern Amazonian state of Pará. Fazenda São Marcos is located approximately 20 km east of Aurora do Pará, off the Belém-Brasília highway.

== Life and career ==
Meira was a descendant of the Portuguese-born landowning family de Magalhães, who had lived in Brazil since the early 18th century; he aspired to a career as a diplomat, but after being rejected by the Rio Branco Institute, he devoted himself entirely to acting, for which he chose his mother's maiden name, Meira, as his stage name. From 1957 on, he appeared regularly on the theater stage. His first television role was in 1961 in the telenovela Maria Antonieta, and his first appearance in a feature film was in 1963 in Casinha Pequenina. Also in 1963, Meira played a leading role in the first daily broadcast telenovela in Brazil, 2-5499 Ocupado.

Meira was married to actress Glória Menezes since 1962. Their son together (b. 1964) also became a well-known actor under the stage name Tarcísio Filho. In 1968, Meira and Menezes were signed by TV Globo as permanent cast members for telenovelas. Their first telenovela produced by TV Globo, Sangue e Areia (1968), based on Vicente Blasco Ibáñez's novel Blood and Sand, enjoyed great public success. Afterwards, Meira and Menezes were also frequently cast as married couples or lovers. In the 1980s, Meira increasingly appeared in feature films and television miniseries, but kept working in telenovelas and stage as well.

== Death ==
Tarcisio Meira was hospitalized on 6 August with COVID-19. He died from the virus on 12 August 2021, at the Hospital Albert Einstein in São Paulo.

== Filmography ==
=== Film ===
- 1963: Casinha Pequenina – Nestor
- 1965: A Desforra
- 1969: Máscara da Traição – Carlos Almeida
- 1970: Verão de Fogo – Killer
- 1970: Quelé do Pajeú – Clemente Celidônio / Quelé
- 1970: Amemo Nus (unfinished)
- 1971: As Confissões de Frei Abóbora
- 1972: Missão: Matar – José da Silva
- 1972: Independência ou Morte – Pedro I of Brazil
- 1974: O Marginal – Valdo
- 1977: Elza e Helena
- 1979: República Dos Assassinos – Mateus
- 1979: O Caçador de Esmeraldas – Capitão-Mor
- 1980: A Idade da Terra – Military Christ
- 1981: Eu Te Amo – Ulisses
- 1981: O Beijo no Asfalto – Aprígio
- 1982: Amor Estranho Amor – Dr. Osmar / politician
- 1983: O Cangaceiro Trapalhão
- 1987: Eu – Marcelo / Father
- 1989: Solidão, Uma Linda História de Amor
- 1990: Boca de Ouro – Boca
- 1994: Boca – Boca
- 2011: Não Se Preocupe, Nada Vai Dar Certo – Ramon Velasco

=== Soap operas ===
- 1963: 2-5499 Ocupado – Larry
- 1964: Ambição – Miguel (TV Excelsior)
- 1965: A Deusa Vencida – Edmundo Amarante (TV Excelsior)
- 1966: Almas de Pedra – Eduardo (TV Excelsior)
- 1967: O Grande Segredo – Celso (TV Excelsior)
- 1967: Sangue e Areia – Juan Gallardo
- 1968: A Gata de Vison – Bob Ferguson
- 1969: Rosa Rebelde – Sandro / Fernando de Aragón
- 1970: Irmãos Coragem – João Coragem
- 1971: O Homem que Deve Morrer – Ciro Valdez
- 1973: Cavalo de Aço – Rodrigo Soares
- 1973: O Semideus – Hugo Leonardo Filho / Raúl de Paula
- 1975: Escalada – Antônio Dias
- 1976: Saramandaia – D. Pedro I (special participation)
- 1977: Espelho Mágico – Diogo Maia
- 1979: Os Gigantes – Fernando Lucas
- 1980: Coração Alado – Juca Pitanga
- 1981: Brilhante – Paulo César
- 1983: Guerra dos Sexos – Felipe de Alcântara Pereira Barreto
- 1986: Roda de Fogo – Renato Villar
- 1990: Araponga – Aristênio Catanduva (Araponga)
- 1992: De Corpo e Alma – Diogo
- 1993: Fera Ferida – Feliciano Mota da Costa (special participation)
- 1994: Pátria Minha – Raul Pellegrini
- 1996: O Rei do Gado – Giuseppe Berdinazzi (special participation in the first phase)
- 1998: Torre de Babel – César Toledo
- 2001: Um Anjo Caiu do Céu – João Medeiros
- 2002: O Beijo do Vampiro – Bóris Vladesco
- 2004: Senhora do Destino – José Carlos Tedesco (special participation)
- 2005: Bang Bang – John McGold (special participation)
- 2006: Páginas da Vida – Tide (Aristides Martins de Andrade)
- 2008: A Favorita – Copola
- 2016: A Lei do Amor – Fausto Leitão
- 2018: Orgulho e Paixão – Sir George Magnus Williamson (Lorde Williamson)
- 2020: Os Casais que Amamos – Himself

=== Series ===
- 1984: Meu destino é pecar – Paulo de Oliveira
- 1985: O Tempo e o Vento – Capitão Rodrigo Cambará
- 1985: Grande Sertão: Veredas – Hermógenes
- 1988: Tarcísio & Glória – Bruno Lazzarini
- 1998: Hilda Furacão – Coronel João Possidônio (participation)
- 2000: A Muralha – Dom Jerônimo Taveira
- 2004: Um Só Coração – Antônio de Sousa Borba (Colonel Totonho)
