= A Cabana do Pai Tomás =

Brazilian television series

- Genre: Telenovela
- Created by: Hedy Maia; Glória Magadan; Walther Negrão
- Directed by: Fábio Sabag; Daniel Filho; Walter Campos; Régis Cardoso
- Starring: Sérgio Cardoso; Ruth de Souza; Paulo Goulart; Miriam Mehler
- Opening theme: "Cabana do Pai Tomás" by Lyrio Panicali
- Country of origin: Brazil
- Original language: Portuguese
- No. of episodes: 204

Production
- Running time: 45 minutes

Original release
- Network: TV Globo
- Release: 7 July 1969 – 28 February 1970

A Cabana do Pai Tomás is a Brazilian telenovela produced and broadcast by TV Globo. It is based on Harriet Beecher Stowe's Uncle Tom's Cabin. It premiered on 7 July 1969 and ended on 28 February 1970, with a total of 205 episodes. It was the sixth "novela das sete" to be aired at the timeslot. It was created by Hedy Maia, Glória Magadan, Walther Negrão and directed by Fábio Sabag.

== Cast ==
Ator	Character
Sérgio Cardoso	Pai Tomás / Dimitrius / Abraham Lincoln
Ruth de Souza	Cloé
Paulo Goulart	Pierre Saint Clair
Miriam Mehler	Bárbara Morrison
Milton Gonçalves	Hasan (Onça)
Rachel Martins	Martha Saint Clair
Turíbio Ruiz	Mr. Shelby
Maria Luíza Castelli	Ofélia
Felipe Carone	Arquibaldo Morrison
Norah Fontes	Jessica Morrison
Germano Filho	Natanié
Isaura Bruno	Betsy
Jonas Mello	Jimmy
Jacyra Silva	Cassie
Edney Giovenazzi	Mr. Legris
Eloísa Mafalda	Emily
Renato Master	David
Luiz Pini	Aramis Grend
Lola Brah	Andressa Grend
Gésio Amadeu	Sam
Isabella Cerqueira	Eleonora
Macedo Neto	Rudi
Nívea Maria	Elisa
Jorge Coutinho	Angelus
Chica Xavier	Lica
Haroldo de Oliveira]l	Jonas
Ivete Bonfá	Cláudia Grend
Regina Macedo	Ruth
Érico Freitas	George
Terezinha Cubana	Piggy
