= Bicho do Mato (TV series) =

- Genre: Romance; Drama
- Created by: Chico de Assis; Renato Corrêa de Castro
- Directed by: Moacyr Deriquém
- Starring: Osmar Prado; Débora Duarte; Beth Barcellos; Pedro Paulo Rangel; Luís Delfino; Ruth de Souza; José de Arimathéa; Sandra Bréa; Paulo Padilha; Célia Biar; Mário Gomes; Lúcia Alves
- Opening theme: "Bicho do Mato" by Eustáquio Sena
- Country of origin: Brazil
- Original language: Portuguese
- No. of episodes: 141

Production
- Running time: 50 minutes

Original release
- Network: TV Globo
- Release: 8 May – 17 November 1972

Bicho do Mato is a Brazilian telenovela produced and broadcast by TV Globo between 8 May and 17 November 1972, running for 141 episodes. It was preceded by Meu Pedacinho de Chão and succeeded by A Patota, being the second 6 PM telenovela broadcast by TV Globo.

It was created by Chico de Assis and Renato Corrêa de Castro, and directed by Moacyr Deriquém. It was produced in black and white.

It stars Osmar Prado, Débora Duarte, Beth Barcellos, Pedro Paulo Rangel, Luís Delfino, José de Arimathéa, Ruth de Souza and Sandra Bréa as the main characters.

Similarly to a large part of programs produced before 1975 by TV Globo, it was completely lost in a fire which affected TV Globo's collection in 1976, and only teasers and behind-the-scenes images survive.

== Production ==
The story continued the line of telenovelas with educational purpose about the origin of the Brazilian, started on Meu Pedacinho de Chão. It was the first telenovela featuring Luís Delfino and Fábio Mássimo. Unlike the previous ones, it premiered a week before it aired nationally on Pernambuco, on 24 April 1972, and only on 8 May for the rest of Brazil.

In 2006 RecordTV produced a new homonymous version, broadcast on the 7 pm timeslot, bringing beyond the central plot, some changes and new cores. The version repeated the success of the original, reaching 18 IBOPE points on the last episode. On the version, the name of the main character was changed from Ruth to Cecília, while the antagonist's name changed from Yara to Ruth.
