= Glória Menezes =

Brazilian actress (1934–2026)

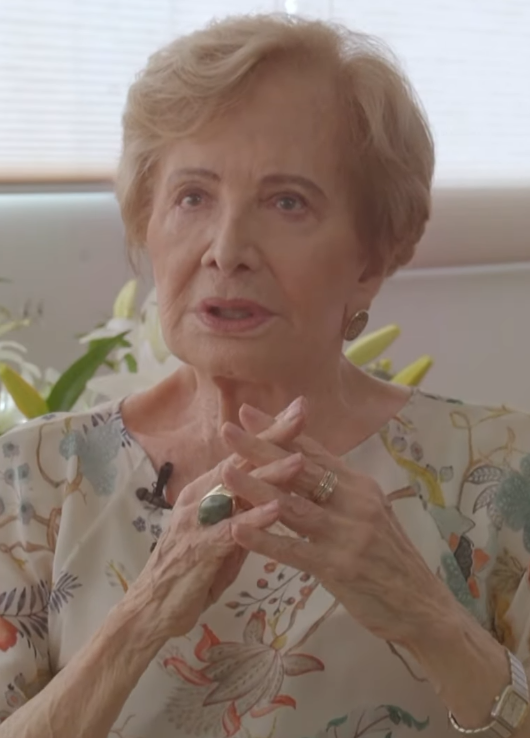
- Menezes in 2020
- Born: Nilcedes Soares Guimarães; 19 October 1934; Pelotas, Rio Grande do Sul, Brazil
- Died: 18 August 2026 (aged 91); Rio de Janeiro, Brazil
- Occupation: Actress
- Years active: 1957–2020
- Spouses: Arnaldo Brito (m. 1951; div. 1959) Tarcísio Meira (m. 1962; died 2021)
- Children: 3, including Tarcísio Filho

Nilcedes Soares de Magalhães (née Guimarães; 19 October 1934 – 18 August 2026), better known as Glória Menezes, was a Brazilian actress. She began her television career in the 1950s and rose to prominence as the lead in several successful telenovelas, becoming part of the first generation of professionals in the genre in Brazil. Among the awards she received were an APCA Award, three Troféu Imprensa awards and three Prêmio Qualidade Brasil awards. She was also honoured with the Oscarito Trophy at the Gramado Film Festival and the Mário Lago Trophy in recognition of her artistic career.

Menezes began her training at the School of Dramatic Arts, where she founded the Jovens Independentes group and took part in her first stage productions. Her first professional role earned her a newcomer award at a theatre festival. In 1959, she made her telenovela debut in Um Lugar ao Sol, produced by TV Tupi. The following year, she made her film debut in O Pagador de Promessas, a film nominated for an Oscar and regarded as one of the highlights of Brazilian cinema.

She subsequently rose to prominence on television by starring in several telenovelas alongside Tarcísio Meira, to whom she was married for 59 years, until his death in August 2021. Their professional partnership began at TV Excelsior in 2-5499 Ocupado, regarded as the first daily telenovela on Brazilian television. Among the couple's best-known productions are A Deusa Vencida (1965), Sangue e Areia (1967), Rosa Rebelde (1969), Irmãos Coragem (1970), O Semideus (1973) and Cavalo de Aço (1973).

From the 1980s onwards, Menezes broadened her television work, appearing in telenovelas by various writers and also exploring comedy. She acted in Jogo da Vida (1980), Guerra dos Sexos (1983) and Brega & Chique (1987). In 1990, she played her first villain, Laurinha Figueiroa, in Rainha da Sucata. In 1992, she received the Troféu Imprensa for Best Actress for her performance in Deus nos Acuda. She also appeared in productions including A Próxima Vítima (1995), Torre de Babel (1998), O Beijo do Vampiro (2002), Senhora do Destino (2004), A Favorita (2008) and Totalmente Demais (2015), her final telenovela.

== Life and career ==
Glória Menezes was born in Pelotas, in the state of Rio Grande do Sul, on 19 October 1934. Her real name, Nilcedes, is the joining of both her father's name, José Nilo, and her mother's name, Mercedes.

At the age of six, she and her family moved to São Paulo, where she attended University of São Paulo's School of Dramatic Arts and founded a theater group called Jovens Independentes. Her professional career began on São Paulo's TV Tupi in 1959, in the soap opera Um Lugar ao Sol, directed by Dionísio Azevedo. In 1962 she appeared in the film O Pagador de Promessas, alongside Leonardo Villar and Anselmo Duarte. In 1963, alongside Tarcísio Meira, she starred in the first daily soap opera on Brazilian television, 2-5499 Ocupado, broadcast by TV Excelsior. It was during this soap opera that the two actors began dating.

In 2007 and 2015, Menezes acted on stage in the Brazilian adaptation of the 1971 American film Harold and Maude. She portrayed the role of Maude while actor Arlindo Lopes took the role of Harold.

The Uruguayan LGBT rights activist Gloria Meneses named herself after Menezes.

Menezes died in Rio de Janeiro on 18 August 2026, at the age of 91.

== Partial filmography ==
- Um Lugar ao Sol (1959, TV Series) – Eloá
- Há Sempre o Amanhã (1960, TV Series) – Lucy
- TV de Comédia (1960–1962, TV Series) – Elvira / Elza / Suzy
- TV de Vanguarda (1960–1962, TV Series) – Maria Clara / Jane Eyre
- O Pagador de Promessas (1962) – Rosa
- A Estranha Clementine (1962, TV Series) – Clementine
- 2-5499 Ocupado (1963, TV Series) – Emily
- Lampião, O Rei do Cangaço (1964)
- Uma Sombra em Minha Vida (1964, TV Series) – Maria Rosa
- A Deusa Vencida (1965, TV Series) – Cecília
- Pedra redonda 39 (1965, TV Series) – Jane
- Almas de Pedra (1966, TV Series) – Cristina Ramalho
- As Minas de Prata (1966–1967, TV Series) – Zana
- O Grande Segredo (1967, TV Series) – Marta / Ana Célia
- Sangue e Areia (1967–1968, TV Series) – Doña Sol
- Passo dos Ventos (1968–1969, TV Series) – Vivian Chevalier
- Rosa Rebelde (1969, TV Series) – Rosa Malena / Simone Grandet
- O Impossível Acontece (1969) – Lúcia (segment "Eu, Ela e o Outro")
- Máscara da Traição (1969) – Cristina Almeida
- Irmãos Coragem (1970–1971, TV Series) – Lara / Diana / Márcia
- O Homem Que Deve Morrer (1971–1972, TV Series) – Esther
- Independência ou Morte (1972) – Domitila de Castro, Marchioness of Santos
- Caso Especial (1972–1973, TV Series) – Hermínia / Marina / Marguerite Gautier
- O Descarte (1973) – Cláudia Land
- Cavalo de Aço (1973, TV Series) – Miranda
- O Semideus (1973–1974, TV Series) – Ângela
- O Grito (1975–1976, TV Series) – Marta
- Espelho Mágico (1977, TV Series) – Leila Lombardi (Rosana, em "Coquetel de amor")
- Pai Herói (1979, TV Series) – Ana Preta
- O Caçador de Esmeraldas (1979) – Maria Betim
- Jogo da Vida (1981–1982, TV Series) – Jordana
- Guerra dos Sexos (1983–1984, TV Series) – Roberta Leone
- Para Viver um Grande Amor (1984)
- Corpo a Corpo (1984–1985, TV Series) – Tereza Fonseca
- Brega & Chique (1987, TV Series) – Rosemere
- Rainha da Sucata (1990, TV Series) – Laura "Laurinha" Albuquerque Figueroa
- Xuxa e a Fábrica de Ilusões (1991) – Herself
- Deus nos Acuda (1992–1993, TV Series) – Bábara Silveira Bueno (Baby Bueno)
- A Próxima Vítima (1995, TV Series) – Julia Braga
- Vira-Lata (1996, TV Series) – Stela
- Torre de Babel (1998–1999, TV Series) – Marta Leme Toledo
- Porto dos Milagres (2001, TV Series) – Dona Coló (primeira fase)
- O Beijo do Vampiro (2002–2003, TV Series) – Zoroastra
- Da Cor do Pecado (2004, TV Series) – Kiki de Queensburg
- Um Só Coração (2004, TV Mini-Series) – Camila
- Senhora do Destino (2004–2005, TV Series) – Baronesa Laura
- If I Were You (2006) – Vivinha
- Páginas da Vida (2006–2007, TV Series) – Amalia
- A Favorita (2008–2009, TV Series) – Irene
- Cama de Gato (2009–2010, TV Series) – Herself
- Louco por Elas (2012–2013, TV Series) – Violeta Corrêa Santiago
- Joia Rara (2013–2014, TV Series) – Pérola Fonseca Hauser (adult)
- Totalmente Demais (2015–2016, TV Series) – Stelinha Carneiro de Alcântara
- Tá no Ar, a TV na TV (2018, TV Series) – Herself
- Os Casais que Amamos (2020) – Herself
- Ensina-me a viver (2021) – Maude
