= Uma Rosa com Amor (1972 TV series) =

- Genre: Telenovela; Romantic comedy
- Created by: Vicente Sesso
- Directed by: Walter Campos
- Starring: Marília Pêra; Paulo Goulart; Yoná Magalhães; Grande Otelo; Tônia Carrero; Marcos Paulo; Leonardo Villar; Jacyra Silva; Lélia Abramo; Felipe Carone; Wanda Lacerda; Ênio Santos
- Opening theme: "Uma Rosa com Amor" by Kris & Cristina
- Country of origin: Brazil
- Original language: Portuguese
- No. of episodes: 221

Production
- Running time: 45 minutes

Original release
- Network: TV Globo
- Release: 16 October 1972 – 30 June 1973

Related
- Uma Rosa com Amor (2010)

Uma Rosa com Amor is a Brazilian telenovela produced and broadcast by TV Globo. It premiered on 16 October 1972 and ended on 30 June 1973, with a total of 221 episodes. It is the eleventh "novela das sete" to be aired in the timeslot. It is created by Vicente Sesso and directed by Walter Campos.

== Cast ==
Ator	Personagem
Marília Pêra	Serafina Rosa Petrone
Paulo Goulart	Claude Antoine Geraldi
Yoná Magalhães	Nara Paranhos de Vasconcelos
Grande Otelo	Pimpinoni
Lélia Abramo	Amália Petrone
Felipe Carone	Giovanni Petrone
Tônia Carrero	Roberta Vermont
Marcos Paulo	Sérgio Camargo
Wanda Lacerda	Joana Camargo (Joana Carioca)
Leonardo Villar	Frazão
Jacyra Silva	Alabá
Ênio Santos	Egídio Paranhos
Eleonor Bruno	Catarina Rosa Batateira
Gilberto Martinho	Carlos de Vasconcelos
Monah Delacy	Jerusa Garcez
Ary Fontoura	Afrânio
Henriqueta Brieba	Pepa
Nélson Caruso	Antônio Rosa Batateira (Antoninho)
Sônia Dutra	Janete
Jorge Cherques	Hugo Lombardi
Dinorah Marzullo	Carmem
Tamara Taxman	Ercy Andrade
José Augusto Branco	Milton Rosa Batateira
Nívea Maria	Tereza Petrone (Terezinha)
Roberto Pirillo	Roberto Paranhos de Vasconcelos (Beto)
Jacqueline Laurence	Alzira
Alberto Pérez	Dr. Freitas
Heloísa Helena	Dona Genoveva (Genô)
Selma Lopes	Dona Antonieta
Aurimar Rocha	Mr. Darley Smith
Rosita Thomaz Lopes	Mrs. July Smith
Fernando José	Oscar
Cléa Simões	Elisa
Paulo Padilha	Alfredo Gurgel
Paulo Ramos	Haddad
Márcia Couto	Cleide Rosa Batateira
Luís Fernando Guimarães	Colibri
Elisa Fernandes	Ninica
Beth Barcellos	Raquel Paranhos de Vasconcelos
Herivelto Martins Filho	Dino Petrone
Haroldo Botta	João (Joãozinho)
