= Arlete Salles =

Brazilian actress

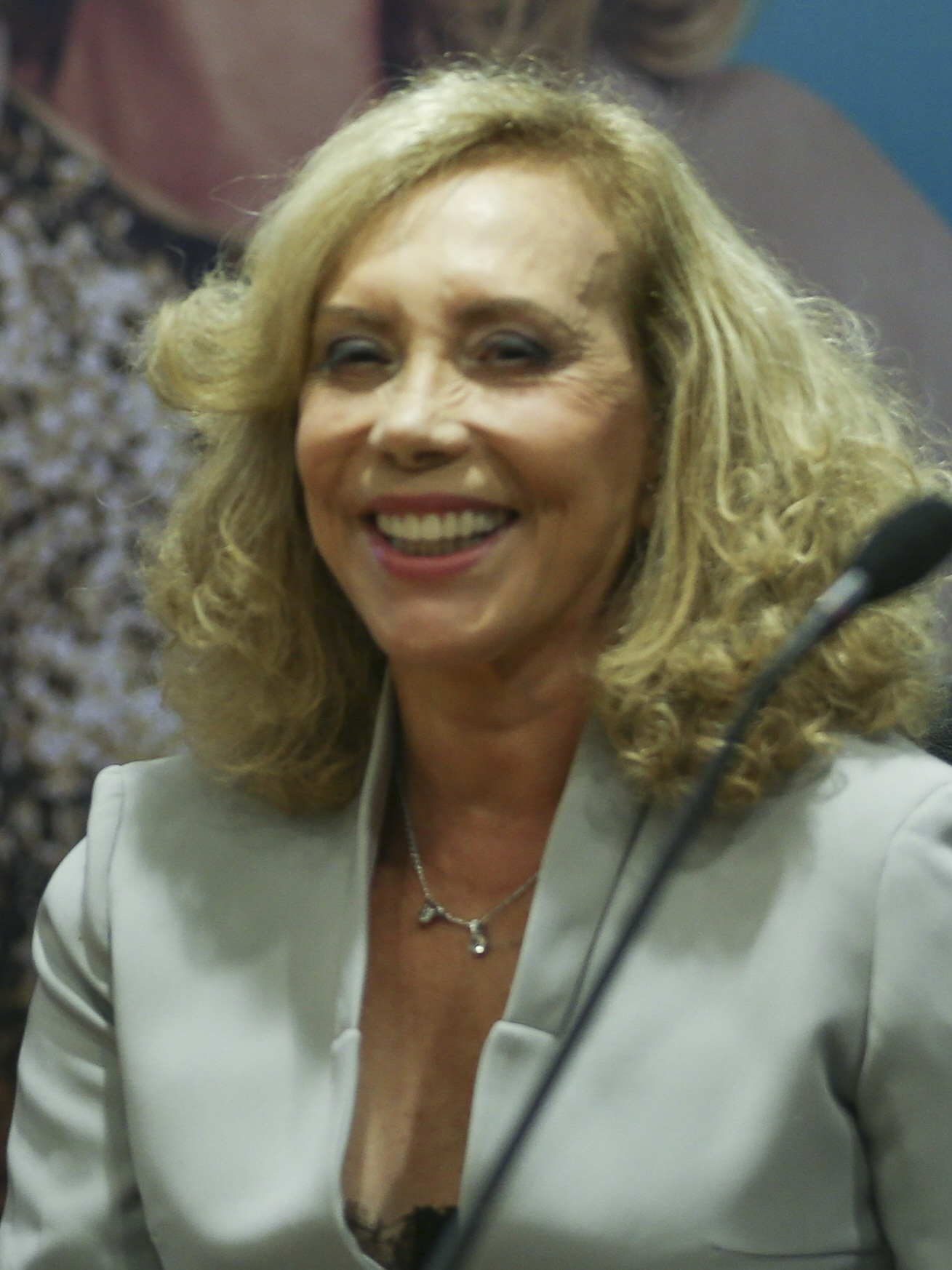
- Salles in 2016
- Born: Arlete Sales Lopes; 17 June 1938 (age 88); Paudalho, Pernambuco, Brazil
- Occupation: Actress
- Years active: 1955–present
- Spouses: Lúcio Mauro (m. 1958; div. 1977) Tony Tornado (divorced)
- Children: 2

Arlete Sales Lopes (born 17 June 1938) is a Brazilian actress.

== Biography ==
Born in the interior of Pernambuco, she was married between 1958 and 1970 to the actor Lucio Mauro, with whom she has two children. She divorced Lucio Mauro and at the end of the 1970s, and was married to actor Tony Tornado. Arlete Salles was the joint winner of the São Paulo Association of Art Critics Award for Best Actress in 1996. After battling cancer, she returned to TV in 2016 as a comical maid Consuelo in Babilônia. As of 2017 she is cast on a major role in a new telenovela O Alienista, based on a book by Machado de Assis.

== Filmography ==
=== Television ===
Year	Title	Role	Notes
1972-1973	Selva de Pedra	Laura	
1978-1979	A Sucessora	Germana Steen	
1979	Cabocla	Pepa	
1981	Baila Comigo	Dolores Moreira	
1984	Amor com Amor Se Paga	Sílvia	
1989	Tieta	Carmosina	
1990	Lua Cheia de Amor	Kika Jordão	
1992	Pedra sobre Pedra	Delegada Francisquinha	
1995-1996	Cara & Coroa	Cacilda Montez	
1998	Porto dos Milagres	Augusta Eugênia Proença de Assumpção	
1998	Hilda Furacão	Madame Janete	
2003	Sítio do Picapau Amarelo	Hermengarda	Episode: Rapunzel
2005	A Lua Me Disse	Ademilde Goldoni	
2007-2009	Toma Lá, Dá Cá	Copélia Rocha	
2015	Babilônia	Consuelo Pimenta	
2022	Além da Ilusão	Santa Figueiredo Andrade	
2023	Cara e Coragem	Judge	Guest star
2024	Família é Tudo	Frida Mancini and Catarina Mancini Galindo	
2025	Três Graças	Josefa Melo Dantas	
