= Daniel Filho =

Brazilian film producer

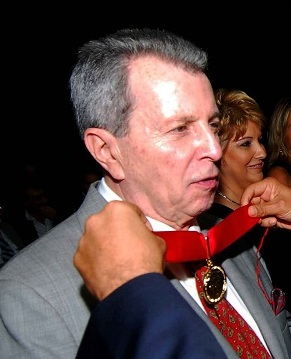
- Filho receiving the Comenda da Paz Chico Xavier in 2010
- Born: João Carlos Daniel Filho; 30 September 1937 (age 89); Rio de Janeiro, Brazil
- Occupations: Film producer Film director Actor; Screenwriter
- Years active: 1955–present

João Carlos Daniel Filho (born 30 September 1937), best known as Daniel Filho, is a Brazilian film producer, director, actor, and screenwriter. He starred in the 1962 film The Unscrupulous Ones, which was entered into the 12th Berlin International Film Festival.

== Personal life ==
Filho was previously married to Regina Duarte, an actress who served as Special Secretary of Culture in the presidency of Jair Bolsonaro.

== Selected filmography ==
Actor

| 1955 | Sítio do Pica-pau Amarelo |
| 1955 | Colégio de Brotos |
| 1956 | Fuzileiro do Amor |
| 1957 | Maluco por Mulher |
| 1957 | Tem Boi na Linha |
| 1961 | Mulheres e Milhões |
| 1961 | Esse Rio que Eu Amo |
| 1961 | Eu sou o Tal |
| 1962 | Os Cafajestes |
| 1963 | Marafa (filme inacabado) |
| 1963 | Boca de Ouro |
| 1968 | Juventude e Ternura |
| 1969 | A Cama ao Alcance de Todos |
| 1969 | The Heirs |
| 1970 | O Impossível Acontece |
| 1971 | As Quatro Chaves Mágicas |
| 1972 | Roleta Russa |
| 1974 | Ana, a Libertina |
| 1975 | O Casal |
| 1978 | Chuvas de Verão |
| 1981 | O Beijo no Asfalto |
| 1982 | Sítio do Picapau Amarelo |
| 1983 | Bar Esperança |
| 1984 | Quilombo |
| 1984 | Espelho de Carne |
| 1987 | Romance da Empregada |
| 1987 | Tanga (Deu no New York Times?) |
| 1987 | Um Trem para as Estrelas |
| 1991 | O Corpo |
| 1996 | Tieta do Agreste |
| 2002 | Querido Estranho |
| 2006 | Se Eu Fosse Você |
| 2009 | Tempos de Paz |
| 2009 | Se Eu Fosse Você 2 |
| 2011 | Assalto ao Banco Central |
| 2014 | Muita Calma Nessa Hora 2 |
| 2017 | Duas de mim |
| 2015 | Até que a Sorte nos Separe 3 |
| 2015 | O Amuleto |
| 2019 | Sai de Baixo - O Filme |
| 2019 | Boca de Ouro |
| 2020 | Tudo Bem No Natal que Vem |

Director

- A Cama ao Alcance de Todos (1969)
- Believe It or Not (1969)
- Pobre Príncipe Encantado (1969)
- O Casal (1975)
- O Cangaceiro Trapalhão (1983)
- The Inheritance (2001)
- Owner of the Story (2004)
- Lots of Ice and a Little Bit of Water (2006)
- If I Were You (2006)
- Cousin Bazilio (2007)
- If I Were You 2 (2008)
- Peacetime (2009)
- Chico Xavier (2010)
- As Cariocas (2010)
- Confissões de Adolescente (2013)
- Sorria, Você Está Sendo Filmado (2014)
- Boca de Ouro (2019)
- The Silence Of the Rain (2020)

Producer

- Orfeu (1999)
- A Partilha (2001)
- Cazuza – O Tempo Não Pára (2004)
- A Dona da História (2004)
- Muito Gelo e Dois Dedos D'água (2006)
- Se Eu Fosse Você (2006)
- Cousin Basilio (2007)
- Times Of Peace (2009)
- Se Eu Fosse Você 2 (2009)
- Connor Mcnaboe - Kiss me (2010)
- Chico Xavier - O Filme (2010)
- Confissões de Adolescente (2013)
- Sorria, Você Está Sendo Filmado (2014)
- É Fada (2016)
- Sai de baixo - O Filme (2019)
- Boca de Ouro (2019)
- The Silence Of The Rain (2020)
- Executive Order (2020)
