= Janete Clair =

Janete Clair (born Jenete Stocco Emmer; April 25, 1925 – November 16, 1983) was a Brazilian television, radio play, and novel writer. TV series in Brazil continued to be based on her work fifteen years after her 1983 death from cancer in Rio de Janeiro. She was the wife of writer Dias Gomes.

She was born in Conquista, Minas Gerais, Brazil to Salim Emmer, a merchant and Carolina Stocco, a seamstress. Through her father she was of Lebanese descent.
