= Marina Ruy Barbosa =

Brazilian actress

- Ruy Barbosa in 2024
- Born: Marina Souza Ruy Barbosa; 30 June 1995 (age 31); Rio de Janeiro, Brazil
- Occupations: Actress; businesswoman
- Years active: 2002–present
- Spouse: Alexandre Sarnes Negrão (m. 2017; div. 2021)
- Relatives: Ruy Barbosa (great-great-great-grandfather)
- Website: https://www.shopginger.com.br/

Marina Souza Ruy Barbosa (Portuguese: [maˈɾinɐ ˈʁuj baʁˈbɔzɐ]; born 30 June 1995) is a Brazilian actress. She started off her career as a child actress; her first major role was in the telenovela Começar de Novo. In 2006, she portrayed a prominent character in Silvio de Abreu's Belíssima. She later appeared in Sete Pecados (2007), Escrito nas Estrelas (2010), Morde & Assopra (2011), and Amor à Vida, interpreting Nicole, a young orphan and millionaire who gets cancer, Hodgkin's lymphoma type 4.

In her adult career, she gained great prominence in the telenovela Império, playing the nymphet Maria Isis, thus winning the Contigo Television Awards for Best Supporting Actress. In 2015, she starred in Totalmente Demais — a show that earned an International Emmy nomination for best telenovela.

Barbosa has become a style reference, being a constant presence in the lists of the most elegant women in Brazil. Her red hair is considered her trademark.

She is in big demand to make advertising campaigns, especially in the fashion and beauty segments. She was the celebrity with the second most appearances in commercials aired on broadcast television in Brazil between May and July 2015, and was named one of the Top 25 Celebrities of Brazil in 2015, according to Forbes magazine, the Brazilian edition. In 2015 she was the ninth Brazilian celebrity to appear the most in television ads, according to the ranking of the Competition Control, which monitors the advertising market.

She married Alexandre Sarnes Negrão on 7 October 2017, and the couple announced they had split on 12 January 2021.

== Early life ==
Barbosa was born in Gávea, a southern zone neighborhood in the Rio de Janeiro on 30 June 1995. An only child, she is a great-great-great-granddaughter of writer, jurist and politician Ruy Barbosa from Bahia. Despite the similarity of their names, she is not related to the screenwriter Benedito Ruy Barbosa.

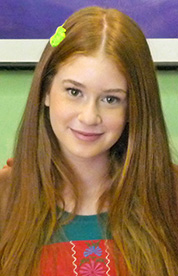
Barbosa as a child

== Career ==
=== Career beginnings ===
Barbosa made her first significant work in the film Xuxa e o Tesouro da Cidade Perdida, where she played the character Mylla, a young princess from a tribe of Vikings, who lived in a lost city inside a forest. Before shooting the movie, she took several Swedish language classes, since all her lines in the film were in that language.

Later, Barbosa auditioned for Começar de Novo, where she played the character Ana, the guardian angel of Miguel (Marcos Paulo). This mysterious character hid important plot secrets, and had unknown origin. She had paranormal powers, with a strong spirituality, and received messages from heaven that guided on her mission on Earth. As the character did not speak, Barbosa had the added challenge of having to communicate mainly through her eyes and facial expressions. It was her first telenovela with screenwriter Elizabeth Jhin.

On 5 March 2005, Barbosa debuted in children's theater as the protagonist of the play Chapeuzinho Vermelho - O Musical in the Teatro dos Grandes Atores, in Barra da Tijuca, and in Teatro do Leblon in Leblon.

Barbosa's work in Começar de Novo earned her an invitation to attend the tests for the character "Sabina" in Belíssima. After going through crowded auditions, she was chosen by the screenwriter Silvio de Abreu and the director Denise Saraceni to play the role. Sabina was an important character in the telenovela plot, the daughter of "Vitória" (Claudia Abreu) and "Pedro" (Henri Castelli), and granddaughter of the villain "Bia Falcão" (Fernanda Montenegro), niece of "Júlia" (Gloria Pires), and goddaughter of "Nikos" (Tony Ramos). Sabina had a great influence on the grandmother, the villain Bia Falcao, who kidnapped her in the story. The character lived in Greece with her parents. To fully play the role, Barbosa took lessons on dance, Greek language and culture, as well as spending a month in Greece, filming the soap opera on the paradise island of Santorini. Barbosa's success in the role made her known in Brazil, and led her to being interviewed on Domingão do Faustão. She was later hired as an exclusive artist by Rede Globo.

The interpretation of Barbosa in Belíssima caught the attention of screenwriter Walcyr Carrasco, who invited her to portray the character "Isabel" in Sete Pecados, the daughter of "Dante" (Reynaldo Gianecchini) and "Clarisse" (Giovanna Antonelli).

In late 2007, Barbosa participated in the first edition of the competition Dança das Crianças, shown on Domingão do Faustão. However, she was the first contestant to be eliminated.

=== 2008–2010: Theater and teenage roles ===
In 2008, Barbosa debuted in adult drama; she was cast by the duo Charles Möeller and Cláudio Botelho to play Clara girl in 7 - O Musical. Acting in the musical was quite a big challenge for her, as she had to represent and also had to sing and dance. Her portrayal of Clara was close to what Möeller imagined. The director Botelho said: "Marina is a demon. She has so much inner life at such a young age and, even with little experience, she shines on the scene as a veteran! That's the kind of 'child actress' we only see in the United States, those who steal movies and plays...Marina makes the difference".

7 - O Musical was the last work of Ida Gomes, Marina's grandmother in the musical, as she died soon after the musical.

In 2009, Barbosa co-hosted a TV Globinho program. She was later invited by director Denise Saraceni to join the show Tudo Novo de Novo, interpreting teenage Bia. She also participated in the sketch "Super Chefinho" shown by the morning show Mais Você.

In March 2010, Barbosa was interviewed by presenter Angelica for the Estrelas show. She made a cultural visit to the Museu Casa Ruy Barbosa, in Botafogo, Rio de Janeiro, the home where her great-great-grandfather Ruy Barbosa lived. In addition to describing the location, Barbosa took the opportunity to show some of her musical skill, playing Beethoven on the piano of her great-grandmother Maria Augusta.

She was invited by author Elizabeth Jhin, who had already made the telenovela Começar de Novo, to play the rebellious teenager "Vanessa" in Escrito nas Estrelas. Vanessa wore dreadlocks in her hair, and was a student of ballet. Barbosa, who had never done ballet, took private lessons to get ready for the role. She played all her ballet scenes without needing a stunt double. She performed her first kissing scene with actor Bruno Pereira, with whom she had worked on Começar de Novo. Barbosa had the idea of creating the zipper earrings used by the character, an accessory that would eventually become a fad among teenagers throughout Brazil. Her Escrito nas Estrelas colleague Nica Bonfim turned the character "Vanessa" into a doll. Barbosa's performance on the telenovela was praised by critics.

In October 2010, Quem magazine prepared a special edition to celebrate its tenth anniversary. Ten young actresses were invited for the cover, produced and shot by Fernando Torquatto, using the self-explanatory title: "As Estrelas da Próxima Década". Barbosa, only 15 years old at the time, was the youngest actress of the ten.

=== 2011–2013: Career growth ===
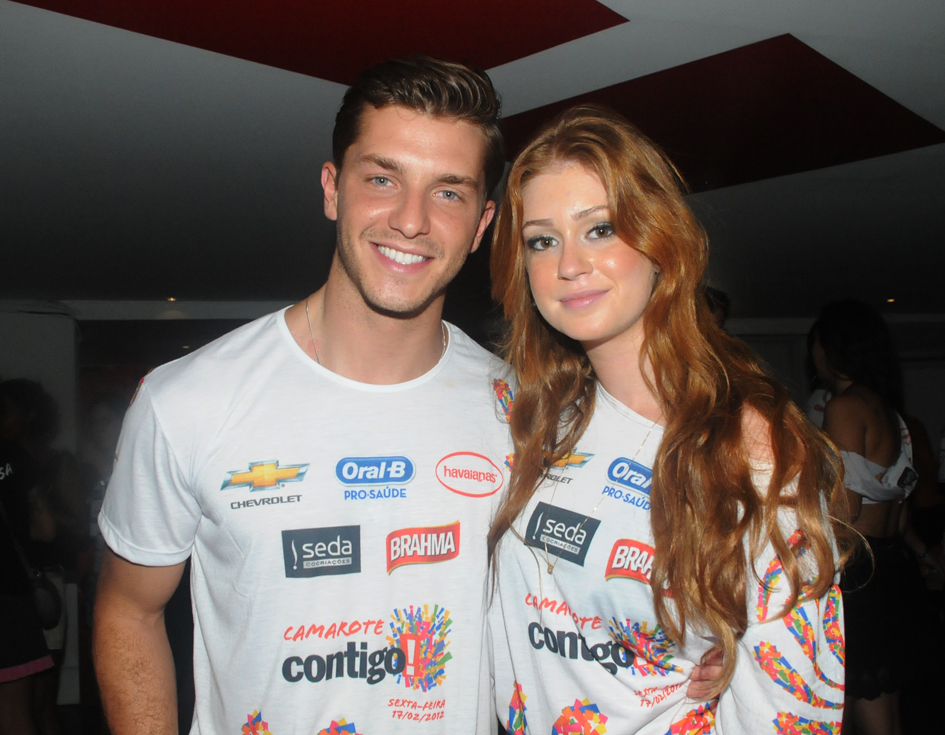
Barbosa and Klebber Toledo

Barbosa was invited by the author Walcyr Carrasco in 2011 to join the cast of the Morde & Assopra as "Alice", a young villain and one of the protagonists of the plot. Alice is a rich 18-year-old girl, vain and prejudiced, wearing only expensive clothes, the daughter of mayor Isaiah (Ary Fontoura) and Minerva (Elizabeth Savalla), who falls for the crook Guilherme (Klebber Toledo). Alice launched the slogans "you are a mongrel" and "I have pedigree" that fell in public taste. Barbosa's performance in Morde & Assopra was highlighted by critics, receiving critical praise from Rio newspaper Extra's journalist Carla Bittencourt, UOL portal's television columnist Flávio Ricco, Terra portal's journalist Mariana Trigo, and Epoca magazine's journalist Bruno Segadilha, among others.

Barbosa is also known for her style of dress, always wearing updated productions following the trends, she is considered an it girl, and has posed for numerous advertising campaigns and editorial fashion.

In 2012, the actress was invited to join the cast of the soap opera Amor Eterno Amor, by author Elizabeth Jhin, portraying Juliana Petrini, a journalism intern.

At only 16, Barbosa was the youngest actress to appear on the cover of NOVA, in the April 2012 edition. In June 2013, at age 17, she would again appear on its cover. In September 2012, Barbosa was elected by ISTOÉ Gente one of the 25 sexiest women of Brazil.

In 2013 she joined the cast of Amor à Vida by Walcyr Carrasco, playing Nicole, a young orphan and millionaire who suffers from a degenerative disease. Barbosa came to prominence in the telenovela, and Nicole became a character loved by the public. Due to requests from viewers and collaborators of the telenovela, the author gave up shaving the head of the actress. The issue became a national discussion and divided the opinions of critics, although the public had been in favor of the actress. With the change in the script, the author's solution was Nicole's death on her wedding day and, after death, Thales (Ricardo Tozzi) start seeing visions of the spirit of Nicole. The episode that showed the marriage the death of Nicole had the telenovela's highest TV ratings. After her death, Nicole remained as a spirit until the end of the telenovela.

In November 2013, Barbosa reached the seventh place in VIP's list of "100 Sexiest Women in the World".

She was on the cover of Quem magazine on 18 December 2013, chosen as one of "the best-dressed women in Brazil" of 2013.

=== 2014–present: Amorteamo and Totalmente Demais ===
In 2014, Barbosa played the nymphet Maria Isis in Aguinaldo Silva's Império.

On August 11, 2014, the end of her three-year relationship with Klebber Toledo was announced.

"Maria Isis" was a watershed in her career, due to her success in the top rated Brazilian television program. She competed for several awards, and at 19 she was the youngest actress to win the Contigo Award! TV for best supporting actress. Success in Império raised her career profile to the protagonist level. She was elected by Vogue as one of the five best dressed Brazilian celebrities of 2014, and named by the Época and Forbes Brazil as one of the most influential Brazilians of 2014.

Barbosa was crowned queen of traditional Carnaval ball at the Copacabana Palace in 2014. At age 19, she is the youngest Carnival queen in the history of the event.

In April 2015, Barbosa played the protagonist "Malvina" on Amorteamo mini-series, a character inspired by Tim Burton's Corpse Bride. She began recording the series during the last shootings of Império, accumulating both works at the same time. It was a big challenge for the actress, who had to play a different role from those she had done before. During Amorteamo shooting, Barbosa had to undergo an emergency appendicitis surgery, but recovered quickly and returned to the shootings. Her acting was praised and the mini-series was successful, a second season, which was to be shot in 2016.

Also in 2015, she played Eliza de Assis Monteiro, the protagonist of the new telenovela Totalmente Demais. In the plot, the character becomes homeless after being the target of an attempted abuse by her stepfather, and will end up turning into a model.

== Philanthropy ==
Barbosa usually does a job as a protector of animals, especially stray cats. She hosts kittens at home while looking for people who want to adopt them. In December 2013, she participated in the animal adoption campaign "Adotei" ("I have adopted").

She also participates in philanthropic campaigns such as the Brazilian Institute for Cancer Control (IBCC), Friends of Children with Cancer (AMICCA) and the Brazilian Association of Lymphoma and Leukemia (ABRALE).

In November 2013, Barbosa was the star of a campaign by the National Day Against Cancer Children and Youth, "Golden November", promoted by the Institute Ronald McDonald. She turned into a warrior, inspired by great heroines of comics and games.

During her preparation for the character Maria Isis in Império, Barbosa cut 30 cm of her hair, which was donated to the NGO Cabelegria, which makes wigs for cancer patients who have lost their hair.

== Filmography ==
=== Television ===
Year	Title	Role	Notes
2002	Sabor da Paixão	Marie	Episode: "March 21"
2004-05	Começar de Novo	Aninha	
2005	Sob Nova Direção	Child at the video store	Episode: "Sexo, Mentiras e DVD"
2005-06	Belíssima	Sabina Rocha Assumpção	
2007	Dança das Crianças	Participant	Season 1 (6th place)
2007-08	Sete Pecados	Isabel Florentino	
2009	TV Globinho	Presenter	Season 10
2009	Super Chefinhos	Participant	Season 1 (3rd place)
2009	Tudo Novo de Novo	Bia	
2010	Escrito nas Estrelas	Vanessa Neves Bittencourt	
2011	Morde & Assopra	Alice Alves Junqueira / Alice da Silva	
2012	Amor Eterno Amor	Juliana Pietrini	
2013-14	Amor à Vida	Nicole Veiga de Assis	
2014-15	Império	Maria Ísis Ferreira da Costa	
2015	Amorteamo	Malvina Benazo Camargo	
2015-16	Totalmente Demais	Eliza de Assis Monteiro	
2016	Justiça	Isabela de Almeida	
2018	Pega Pega	Amália Giordano	Episode "January 8"
2018	Deus Salve o Rei	Amália Giordano	
2018-19	O Sétimo Guardião	Luz Vidal	
2019	Bom Sucesso	Eliza de Assis Monteiro	Episodes: "December 9–11"
2023-24	Fuzuê	Preciosa Montebello	
2023	Rio Connection	Ana Alves Zago	
2023	Angélica: 50 e Tanto	Herself	Episode: "Fama"
2025	Tremembé	Suzane von Richthofen	Documentary series

=== Film ===
Year	Title	Role
2004	Xuxa e o Tesouro da Cidade Perdida	Mylla
2018	Sequestro Relâmpago	Maria Isabel "Isabel" Lima Cavalcante
2018	Todas as Canções de Amor	Ana

=== Music video ===
Year	Song	Role	Artist
2018	"Ocean"	Girl	Alok, Zeeba e IRO
2019	"Partilhar"	She	Rubel e Anavitória

== Stage ==
Year	Title	Character
2005	Chapeuzinho Vermelho – O Musical	Little Red Riding Hood
2008	7 – O Musical	Clara

== Bibliography ==
Year	Title	Gender	Publishing company	ISBN	Notes
2017	Inspirações – Uma Seleção Afetiva de Reflexões e Poemas	Poems	Objetiva	9788547000516	

== Awards and nominations ==
Year	Premium	Category	Indicated work	Result
2016	Troféu Internet	Best Actress	"Eliza" in Totalmente Demais	Won
2015	Prêmio Jovem Brasileiro	Best Actress	"Malvina" in Amorteamo	Won
2015	Prêmio AIB (Association of Barra da Tijuca Press)	Best Supporting Actress	"Maria Isis" in Império	Won
2015	17th Contigo Award	Best Supporting Actress		Won
2015	Troféu Internet	Best Actress		Won
2015	Troféu Imprensa	Best Actress		Won
2015	Melty Future Awards	Cool is Everywhere – Brazil		Won
2014	Melhores do Ano – Domingão do Faustão	Best Supporting Actress		Won
2014	Prêmio Jovem Brasileiro	Best Actress		Won
2014	Prêmio Extra	Best Supporting Actress		Won
2014	Prêmio F5	Hot of the Year	Herself	Won
2014	Capricho Awards	Best National Actress	"Maria Isis" in Império	Won
2014	Meus Prêmios Nick	Favorite Actress	"Nicole" in Amor à Vida	Nominated
2014	Meus Prêmios Nick	Hot of the Year	Hersel	Won
2013	Capricho Awards	Best National Actress	"Nicole" in Amor à Vida	Won
2013	Meus Prêmios Nick	Hot of the Year	Herself	Won
2013	11th Prêmio Jovem Brasileiro	Actress	"Nicole" in Amor à Vida	Nominated
2012	14th Prêmio Contigo	Best Supporting Actress	"Alice" in Morde & Assopra	Nominated
2012	Meus Prêmios Nick	Hot Of The Year	Herself	Nominated
2011	Prêmio Quem	Supporting Actress	"Alice" in Morde & Assopra	Nominated
2011	Video Show Retrô	Most Annoying Valley Girl		Won
2011	Video Show Retrô	Best Wedding Scene		Won
2011	Capricho Awards	Best National Actress		Won
2011	Capricho Awards	Most Stylish National or International Celebrity	Herself	Won
2011	Capricho Awards	Best Real Couple	Herself (with Klebber Toledo)	Nominated
2011	10th Prêmio Jovem Brasileiro	Best Newcomer	"Alice" in Morde & Assopra	Won
2011	Meus Prêmios Nick	Favorite Actress		Nominated
2010	Prêmio Arte Qualidade Brasil	Best Child/Young Actress in a Telenovela	"Vanessa" in Escrito Nas Estrelas	Nominated
2008	10th Prêmio Contigo	Best Child Actress in Television	"Isabel" in Sete Pecados	Nominated
2008	Prêmio Extra de Televisão	Best Child Actor or Actress		Nominated
2007	Melhores do Ano — Domingão do Faustão	Best Child Actor or Actress		Nominated
2007	Prêmio Extra de Televisão	Best Child Actor or Actress	"Sabina" in Belíssima	Nominated
2006	8º Prêmio Contigo	Best Child Actress in Television		Nominated
2005	7th Prêmio Contigo	Best Child Actress in Television	"Aninha" in Começar de Novo	Nominated

=== Honors ===
- In 2010, during the telenovela Escrito nas Estrelas, she was honored by costar and artist Nica Bonfim, who made a doll of the character Vanessa.
- In 2013, artist Marcus Baby honored Barbosa by making a doll dressed as a bride, inspired by Nicole character of the telenovela Amor à Vida.
- In 2015, Marcus Baby was inspired by Barbosa character Malvina on the series Amorteamo to create a featured doll corpse bride.

=== Other honors ===
- Elected "Muse of the summer 2016, by the magazine Vogue Brazil
- Elected "The Best-Dressed Celebrity of the Year" in 2015 by R7 portal
- Named one of "The Top 25 Celebrities in Brazil in 2015", voted by Brazilian Forbes magazine
- Crowned Queen of the Copacabana Palace Carnival Ball, at age 19, the youngest queen in the history of the event
- Featured on the list of the "30 most influential young people in Brazil in 2015" by the Brazilian version of Forbes
- Elected one of "The 100 most influential people of Brazil in 2014", by Época magazine.
- Elected one of "The five Brazilian celebrities best dressed of 2014", by Vogue magazine
- Elected one of "The sexiest Brazilian women of 2014", by men's site El Hombre in December 2014
- Elected by the Brazilian Glamour magazine as "the 4th best-dressed celebrity in the world of 2013", in December 2013
- Elected by VIP magazine as the 7th "Sexiest Woman in the World" in 2013, 15th in 2014 and 5th in 2015
- Elected by the Brazilian version of Glamour as "Brazil's best-dressed celebrity of 2012", and ninth in the world in December 2012
- Chosen by ISTOÉ as the 6th sexiest woman in 2012 in Brazil
