= Rômulo Neto =

Brazilian actor (born 1987)

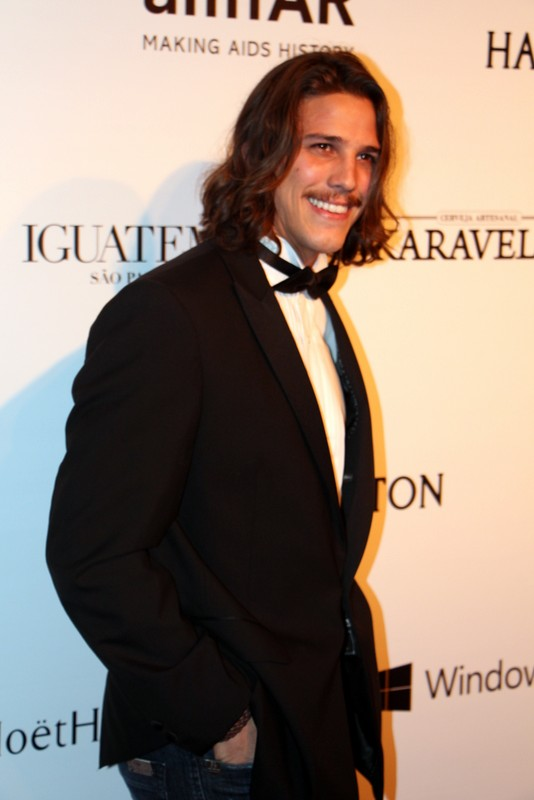
- Neto in 2015
- Born: Rômulo Duncan Arantes Neto; April 9, 1987 (age 39); Rio de Janeiro, Brazil
- Occupation: Actor
- Years active: 2007–present
- Relatives: Rômulo Arantes (father)

Rômulo Duncan Arantes Neto (born April 9, 1987) is a Brazilian actor.

== Career ==
In 2007, he was the male protagonist of the fourteenth season of Malhação. Later, he was called by Rede Record and participated in Os Mutantes: Caminhos do Coração as Telê, a mutant bandit league, remaining with the role in Mutantes: Promessas de Amor.

In 2013, he signed a contract with Rede Globo to perform in Sangue Bom, playing his first villain, Tito Rabelo. In 2014, he was considered for two roles, and eventually assumed the role of Roberto, who was originally Klebber Toledo, in Império.

== Personal life ==
He has dated Lise Grendene, and the soap opera director, Amora Mautner. In 2013, he took up a relationship with actress Cléo Pires.

== Filmography ==
=== Television ===
| Year | Title | Role | Notes |
|---|---|---|---|
| 2007 | Malhação | André Dias | Season 14 |
| 2008 | Caminhos do Coração | Terêncio Ribeiras (Telê) | Episodes: "10–29 May 2008" |
| 2008 | Os Mutantes: Caminhos do Coração | Terêncio Ribeiras (Telê) | |
| 2009 | Mutantes: Promessas de Amor | Terêncio Ribeiras (Telê) | |
| 2009 | Bela, a Feia | Matheus Albuquerque | Episodes: "15–25 December 2009" |
| 2011 | Vidas em Jogo | Raimundo Figueira de Andrade | |
| 2013 | Sangue Bom | Tito Carmim Rabello | |
| 2014 | Saltibum | Participant | Season 1 |
| 2014 | Império | Roberto Teixera da Silva (Robertão) | |
| 2016 | Êta Mundo Bom! | Braz Lima | |
| 2016 | Haja Coração | Himself | Episode: "22 August 2016" |
| 2016 | 1 Contra Todos | Maicon | Episode: "A Lei Vem do Rei" |
| 2017 | Malhação: Pro Dia Nascer Feliz | Rômulo (Primo) | Season 24; Episode: "3 May 2017" |
| 2017 | Pega Pega | Lourenço Gaia | |
| 2018 | Espelho da Vida | Mauro César | |
| 2019 | Toda Forma de Amor | Daniel Alvim | |
| 2023 | Fuzuê | Julião | |

=== Film ===
| Year | Title | Role |
|---|---|---|
| 2016 | Stronger than the World | Fernandinho |
| 2016 | Can't Be Undone | Francis |
| 2023 | A Vampire in the Family | Gregory (Greg) |

== Theater ==
| Year | Title |
|---|---|
| 2013 | Rock in Rio - O Musical |
| 2015 | Amigos, Amigos, Amores à Parte |
| 2017 | Paixão de Cristo |

== Awards and nominations ==
| Year | Award | Category | Work | Result |
|---|---|---|---|---|
| 2014 | Prêmio Quem de Televisão | Best Supporting Actor | Império | Nominated |
