= Totalmente Demais =

Brazilian telenovela

- Also known as: Total Dreamer
- Genre: Telenovela; Romantic comedy
- Created by: Rosane Svartman; Paulo Halm
- Directed by: Luiz Henrique Rios
- Starring: Marina Ruy Barbosa; Felipe Simas; Fábio Assunção; Juliana Paes; Juliana Paiva; Humberto Martins; Vivianne Pasmanter; Daniel Rocha; Giovanna Rispoli; Aílton Graça; Malu Galli; Julianne Trevisol; Leona Cavalli; Paulo Rocha; Samantha Schmütz; Gloria Menezes
- Opening theme: "Totalmente Demais" by Anitta and Flávio Renegado
- Composer: Rogério Vaz
- Country of origin: Brazil
- Original language: Portuguese
- No. of episodes: 175; 130 (international version)

Production
- Production locations: Jacarepaguá, Rio de Janeiro; Sydney, Australia
- Editors: José Carlos Monteiro; Paulo Maia; Renato Fernandez; Rodrigo Clemente; Chris Moura
- Camera setup: Multi-camera
- Running time: 37–42 minutes
- Production company: Entretenimento Globo

Original release
- Network: Rede Globo
- Release: 9 November 2015 – 30 May 2016

Totalmente Demais (English title: Total Dreamer) is a Brazilian telenovela produced and broadcast by TV Globo, from 9 November 2015 to 30 May 2016.

Loosely based on the 1913 play Pygmalion by George Bernard Shaw, Totalmente Demais is written by Rosane Svartman and Paulo Halm, with Mário Viana, Claudia Sardinha, Fabrício Santiago and Felipe Cabral as co-writers. The telenovela is directed by Luiz Henrique Rios. Starring Marina Ruy Barbosa, Felipe Simas, Fabio Assunção, Juliana Paes, Juliana Paiva, Humberto Martins, Vivianne Pasmanter and Daniel Rocha.

In 2017, the show was nominated for the International Emmy Award for Best Telenovela.

== Production ==
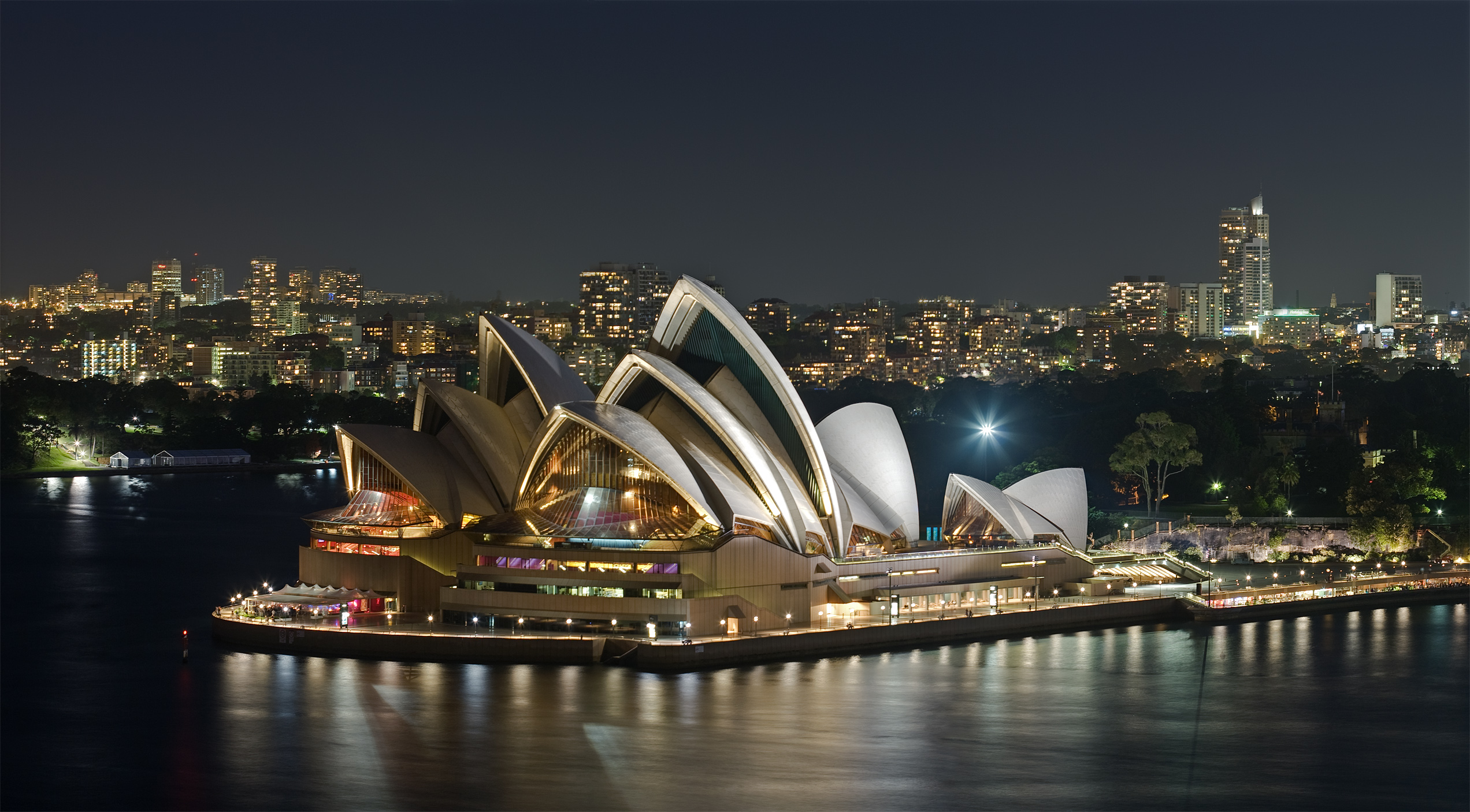
Sydney Opera House served as one of the filming site in Australia

This is the first telenovela written by Rosane Svartman and Paulo Halm, authors of Malhação Sonhos and Malhação Intensa. It was previously titled as Poderosa then later A Dona do Jogo but later it was named Totalmente Demais to go at par with the theme song's title. Some scenes were recorded in Australia with Fábio Assunção, Juliana Paes, Humberto Martins, Vivianne Pasmanter, Marat Descartes and Fernanda Motta, with some of them being shot were recorded in Opera House, Botanical Garden, Bondi Beach, Quay Restaurant and Harbour Bridge. Initial scenes in Rio de Janeiro were recorded in Lapa, Benfica and Flamengo Park. The municipalities of Cachoeiras de Macacu and Guapimirim in Rio de Janeiro also served as shooting points for first scenes of Totalmente Demais. In April 2016, Marina Ruy Barbosa, Fábio Assunção, Juliana Paes and Daniel Rocha filmed scenes in Uruguay, in the cities of Punta del Este and Montevideo. One of the prominent themes in the story was the inclusion of Funk carioca but due to the repetition of the subject in other telenovelas, it was drastically reduced to avoid thematic clichés.

=== Casting and character development ===
Casting was done by Eduardo Milewicz, Rossella Terranova and Maria Roberta Perez. To portray Carolina, Juliana Paes visited the publication chambers of the magazines Vogue and Marie Claire. [26] The telenovela had special appearance of Stênio Garcia as a truck driver Bino that aids Eliza (Marina Ruy Barbosa), leading her to Rio de Janeiro. Garcia also performed the same role in Carga Pesada. Carol Castro and Giovanna Ewbank also made a cameo appearances. Dira Paes was initially cast to portray Rosângela but due to her pregnancy, Malu Galli replaced her. André Arteche was formerly to play the photographer Fábio, but Daniel Rocha portrayed it instead but as Rafael, a character inspired by the French poet, Arthur Rimbaud. Sophia Abrahão auditioned for the role of the journalist Leila, but on realizing that she might not be among the protagonists, she turned down the offer and decided to dedicate her attention on her singing career. Carla Salle portrayed the role instead.

== Plot ==
Eliza is a young 18 year old who runs away from her house in Campo Claro, a fictitious city of the carioca interior, after being harassed by her stepfather Dino. She does not know her biological father and her mother, Gilda, always tells her he was a truck driver who spent most of his time on the road. Her dream is to find her father and help her family leave their difficult living situation. Her mother is married to Dino; the couple have two more children. When Eliza was a child, Dino treated her better, but this changed on the arrival of her half siblings. As soon as she arrives at Rio de Janeiro, she tries to pick up some money, but she is robbed. Without an option, Eliza starts living in the streets, and meets Jonatas, who sells bleats in the traffic lights of the Lapa to help his family and lives in the West zone of the Carioca Capital. She is also being threatened by Jacaré, an outlaw who is very feared and dangerous. She tries to gain money and starts to sell flowers in bars and restaurants. One day, she meets a businessman named Arthur, owner of Excalibur an modeling agency. He promises her that he will help her become a successful model. After a while, she accept his proposal. She is in turn employed in a company, where she will suffer persecutions from Carolina, a ruthless editor relaunching a style magazine who is extremely ambitious and in love with Arthur. He is a divorcee and has daughter named Maria João (Jojô). He falls madly in love with Eliza, which makes Carolina furious. On the other hand, there is Cassandra, who would do anything to become a successful model, and become rich, she allies with Carolina whose mission is to sabotage Arthur and Eliza's relationship.

== Cast ==
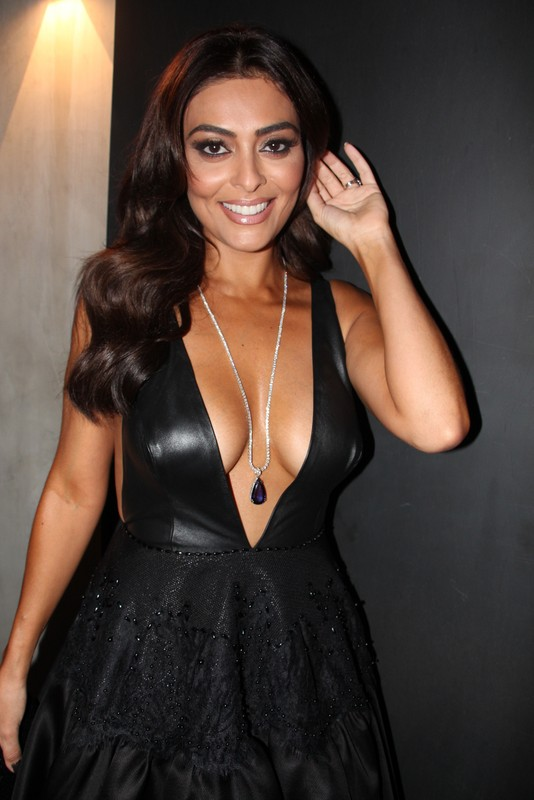
Juliana Paes
Carolina

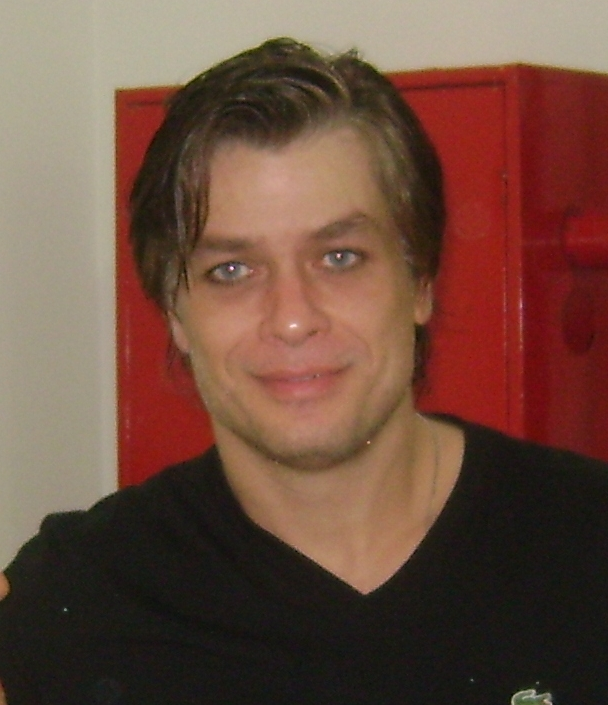
Fábio Assunção
Arthur

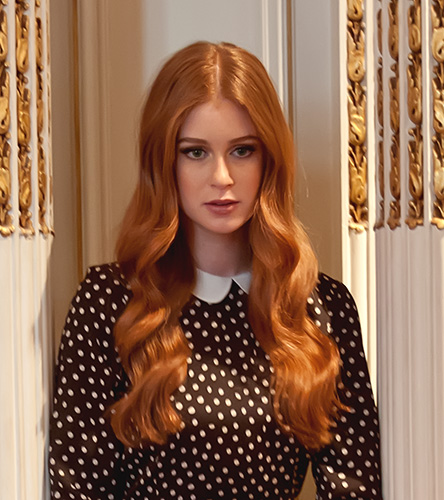
Marina Ruy Barbosa
Eliza

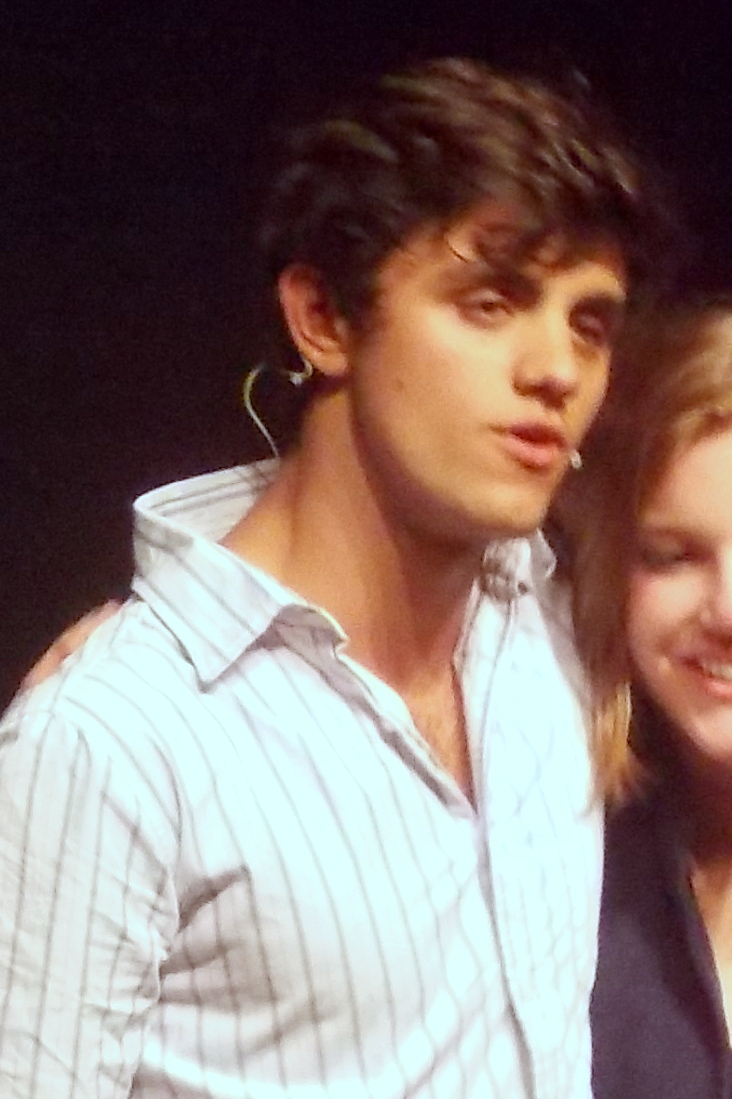
Felipe Simas
Jonatas

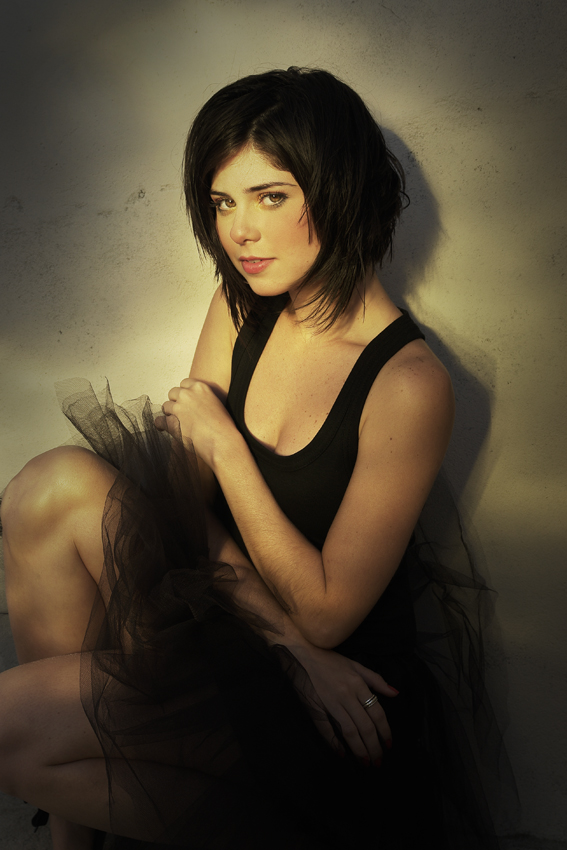
Julianne Trevisol
Lu

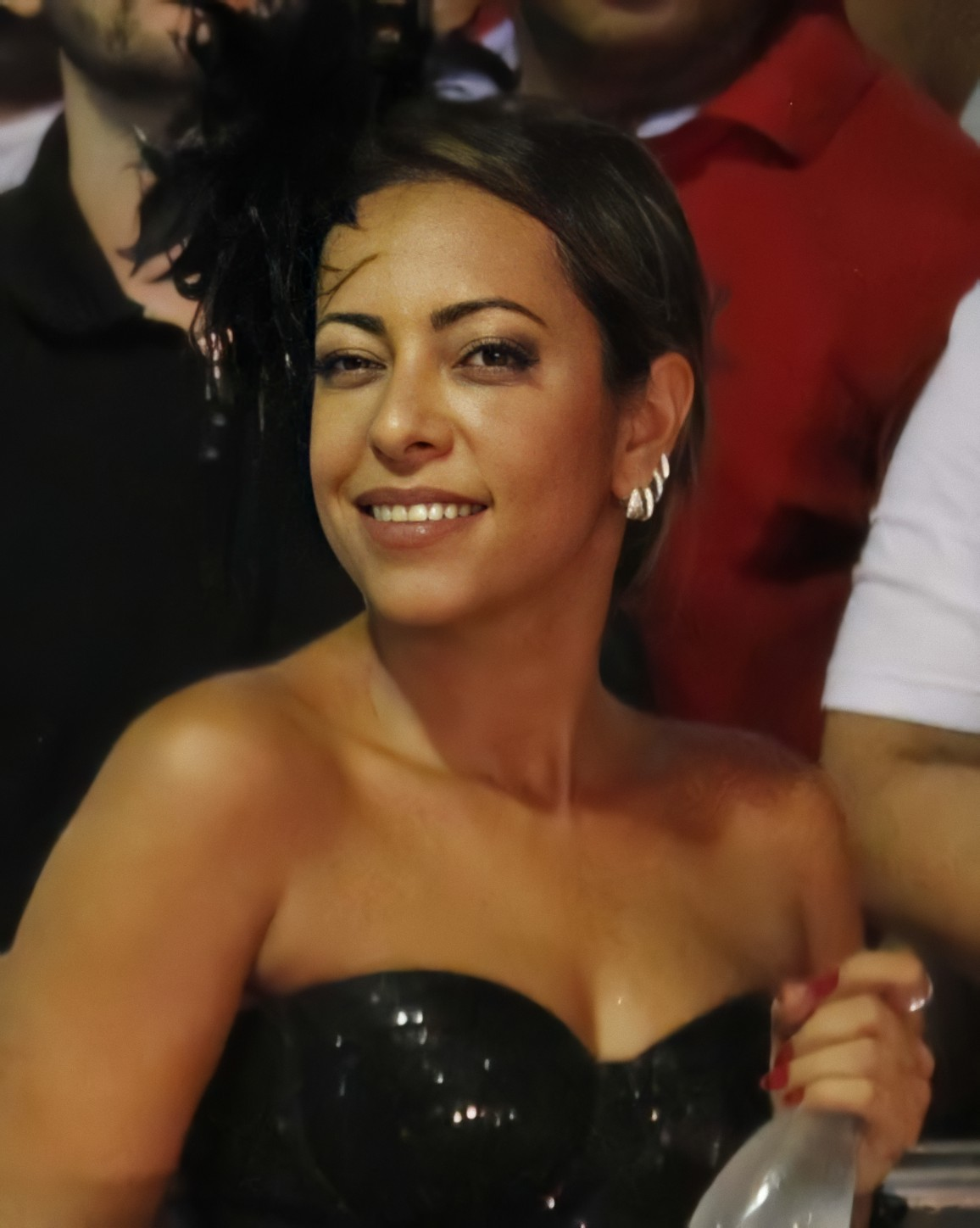
Samantha Schmütz
Dorinha

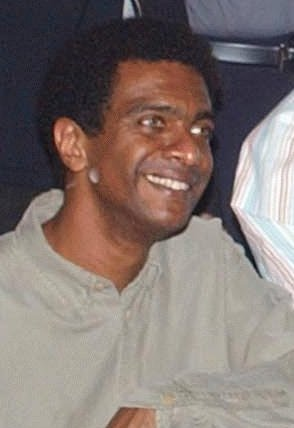
Hélio de La Peña
Zé Pedro

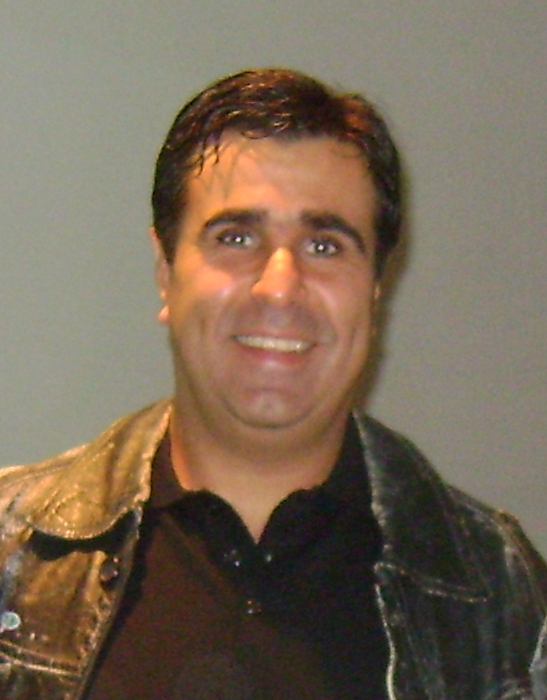
Orã Figueiredo
Hugo

Actor/Actress	Character
Marina Ruy Barbosa	Eliza de Assis Monteiro
Felipe Simas	Jonatas Castro
Fábio Assunção	Arthur Valmont Carneiro de Alcântara
Juliana Paes	Carolina Castilho
Juliana Paiva	Sandra Regina "Cassandra" Matoso
Humberto Martins	Germano Monteiro
Vivianne Pasmanter	Liliane "Lili" de Bocaiuva Monteiro
Daniel Rocha	Rafael Guerra
Giovanna Rispoli	Maria João "Jojô" Oliver de Alcântara
Carla Salle	Leila de Oliveira
Daniel Blanco	Fábio "Fabinho" de Bocaiuva Monteiro
Priscila Steinman	Sofia de Bocaiuva Monteiro / Nina
Leona Cavalli	Gilda de Assis Machado
Paulo Rocha	Erondino "Dino" Machado
Olívia Torres	Débora Matoso
Orã Figueiredo	Hugo Matoso
Malu Galli	Rosângela Lima Castro
Julianne Trevisol	Lu
Samantha Schmütz	Isadora "Dorinha" Castilho
Sérgio Malheiros	Jorge "Jacaré" da Silva
Glória Menezes	Stela "Stelinha" Carneiro de Alcântara
Reginaldo Faria	Maurice de Alcântara
Pablo Sanábio	Maximiliano "Max" Augusto
Marat Descartes	Pietro Enrico
Lavínia Vlasak	Natasha Oliver
Ailton Graça	Florisval Pereira
Aline Fanju	Maristela de Souza
Guida Vianna	Cida
Raphael Sander	Charles
Gabriel Reif	Jamaica
Adriana Birolli	Lorena Domingos
Hélio de La Peña	Zé Pedro
Aline Borges	Kátia
Carolyna Aguiar	Lurdinha
Lellezinha	Jennifer Castro Pereira
Cauê Campos	Anthony "Bola" Castro Lima
Juan Paiva	Wesley Castro Pereira
Jéssica Ellen	Adele Fernandes
Toni Garrido	Sebastião Montanha
Marcelo Arnal	Marcão
Cadu Paschoal	Riscado
Isabella Koppel	Dayse de Assis Machado
Kaik Brum	Carlos "Carlinhos" de Assis Machado
Leonardo Carvalho	Wilson
Dhonata Augusto	Braço
Michelle Costa	Marcinha

=== Special participation ===
Actor/Actress	Character
Nicola Siri	Giancarlo
Carol Castro	Herself
Sílvia Pfeifer	Herself
Paulo Zulu	Himself
Giovanna Ewbank	Herself
Ana Furtado	Herself
Henri Castelli	Himself
Helena Fernandes	Herself
Mariana Rios	Herself
Patrícia Barros	Ellen Millet
Rodrigo Rangel	Peçanha
Ícaro Zulu	Gabriel
Úrsula Corona	Cláudia
Danielle Winits	Sueli Matoso / Suelen
Fernanda Motta	Daniele Liebdich
Luca Ribeiro	Meleka
Lady Francisco	Fátima
Cláudia Sardinha	Jessy
Stênio Garcia	Bino
Paulo Dalagnoli	Lírio Lorenzzo
Créo Kellab	Fernando
Gabriela Carcaioli	Clara
Karine Barros	Emanuelly
Alarisse Mattar	Vitória
Lenita Oliver	Dandara
Malu Falangola	Ana Paula
Marina Cardoso	Daniela
Maura Mesquita	Alessandra
Scarlet Cardoso	Ingrid
Iná de Carvalho	Ruth
Suzana Cordovil	Nicole
Tainá Bevilacqua	Brenda
José Victor Castiel	Commander Magalhães
Tatá Werneck	Fedora Abdala
Gabrielle Aplin	Herself
Antônio Gonzalez	Max father
Anna Cotrim	Max mother

== Soundtrack ==
=== Local songs ===
Totalmente Demais - National

Soundtrack album
- Released: 6 November 2015
- Label: Som Livre

chronology
Totalmente Demais - National (2015)	Totalmente Demais - Orchestra (2015)

Cover
Fábio Assunção and Juliana Paes as Arthur and Carolina respectively.

Totalmente Demais National was released on 6 November 2015 three days before the premiere by Grupo Globo's Som Livre. It contains mainly Braziliantracks and sung by Brazilian artists tracks with variable genres.

No.	Title	Music	Significance	Length
1.	"Totalmente Demais"	Anitta and Flávio Renegado	Main theme song	2:43
2.	"Falta de Ar"	Céu	Cassandra	3:58
3.	"Passarinhos"	Emicida and Vanessa da Mata	Lu and Rafael	3:41
4.	"Tranquila"	Projota and J Balvin	Jacaré	3:20
5.	"Serpente"	Pitty	Carolina	5:45
6.	"Pra Tudo Acontecer"	Suricato	Eliza and Jonatas	3:14
7.	"Só Você"	Roberto Frejat	Arthur	2:54
8.	"Encontrar-te"	Djavan	Arthur and Carolina	4:16
9.	"Jura-me (Jurame)"	Julio Iglesias	Gilda and Dino	4:08
10.	"Mudando de Assunto"	Henrique & Juliano	Hugo	2:51
11.	"Felicidade"	Seu Jorge		4:27
12.	"A Mil por Hora"	Diogo Nogueira		3:01
13.	"Acreditar"	Beth Carvalho	Florisval	3:43
14.	"Fogo e Paixão"	Michel Teló	Florisval, Rosângela and Maristela	3:38
15.	"Tô Valendo Quase Nada"	Banda Porto		3:26
16.	"Convocação"	Koringa		3:27

=== Orchestra ===
Totalmente Demais - Orchestra

Soundtrack album
- Released: 18 December 2015
- Label: Som Livre

chronology
Totalmente Demais - National (2015)	Totalmente Demais - Orchestra (2015)	Totalmente Demais - International (2016)

Totalmente Demais Orchestra was made available on 18 December 2015. It contains instrumental tracks produced by Rogério Vaz solely for the show.

No.	Title	Length
1.	"Bairro de Fátima"	1:35
2.	"Sonho Encantado"	1:54
3.	"Carol Sexy"	2:05
4.	"Eliza"	2:06
5.	"Arthur e Carol"	1:48
6.	"Passinho do Canguru"	1:35
7.	"Germano e Lili"	1:49
8.	"Rio Bonito Suspense"	2:21
9.	"Sonho de Eliza"	1:37
10.	"Carol Jocoso"	0:45
11.	"Maldades"	1:23
12.	"Eliza Tenso"	1:12
13.	"Khaos"	1:21
14.	"Arthur Big Band"	2:31
15.	"Carol Suspense"	1:23
16.	"Jonatas Romântico"	1:50
17.	"Cidade Sombria"	1:27
18.	"Germano e Lili Engraçado Suspense"	1:28
19.	"Germano e Lili Romântico"	1:53
20.	"Eliza Emoção"	2:27
21.	"Arthur Suspense"	1:20
22.	"Rio Bonito"	2:20
23.	"Sete Chaves"	2:04
24.	"Totalmente Valsa"	1:57
25.	"Máfia Russa"	2:38
26.	"Arthur Jocoso"	0:49
27.	"Sonho Encantado" (piano solo)	2:20
28.	"Eliza" (piano solo)	2:15
29.	"Germano e Lili" (piano solo)	1:38
30.	"Funk Russo"	2:04

=== International songs ===
Totalmente Demais - International

Soundtrack album
- Released: 6 March 2016
- Label: Som Livre

chronology
Totalmente Demais - Orchestra	Totalmente Demais - International

Cover
Fábio Assunção, Marina Ruy Barbosa and Felipe Simas as Arthur, Eliza and Jonatas respectively.

Totalmente Demais International was released on 4 March 2016 by Grupo Globo's Som Livre. It contains international tracks with variable genres.

No.	Title	Music	Significance	Length
1.	"How Deep Is Your Love"	Calvin Harris and Disciples	Festas	3:31
2.	"Dynamite"	The Triangles	Festas	3:11
3.	"Cheerleader"	Omi	Lu and Jamaica	3:22
4.	"Fight Song"	Rachel Platten	Eliza	3:21
5.	"Lips Are Movin"	Meghan Trainor	Cassandra	3:00
6.	"Driving Me Crazy"	Electrique		2:59
7.	"Drag Me Down"	One Direction	Arthur	2:54
8.	"Fica (Stay)"	Florida Georgia Line ft. Luan Santana	Débora and Fabinho	3:18
9.	"I've Got You Under My Skin"	Ronaldo Canto and Mello	Stela and Maurice	3:31
10.	"Dreams"	Stylez Major feat. Tony Sway	Leila and Jonatas	3:54
11.	"Home"	Gabrielle Aplin	Eliza and Jonatas	4:06
12.	"One"	Ed Sheeran	Arthur and Eliza	4:10
13.	"Rise Up"	Andra Day	Carolina	4:12
14.	"You Can Rely On Me"	Jason Mraz	Germano and Lili	3:38

== Reception ==
=== Ratings ===
Timeslot	Episodes	Premiere		Finale		Rank	Season	Average viewership
Timeslot	Episodes	Date	Viewers (in points)	Date	Viewers (in points)	Rank	Season	Average viewership
Mondays—Saturdays; 7:15pm	175	9 November 2015	25	30 May 2016	37	#1	2015–16	27

On its premiere, Totalmente Demais registered a viewership rating of 25 points in Greater São Paulo according to consolidated data by Ibope thus registering lower indices to its predecessor I Love Paraisópolis which registered 29 points on its premiere. The show obtained viewership ratings of 25.8 and 26.4 points on 16 and 23 November 2015 respectively. Its highest ratings in November 2015 was 28.3 points.

On 18 January 2016, on the premiere of Êta Mundo Bom!, the telenovela obtained its then new record 29.3 points in São Paulo.

On 22 February 2016, Totalmente Demais broke another record of 31 points in São Paulo. Based on the accumulated data the show registered better ratings since Cheias de Charme (2013).

On the episode aired on 28 April 2016, which had one of the key villains Sofia (Priscila Steinman) was killed off, the telenovela had its highest ratings since its premiere, obtaining 35 points in São Paulo and 39 points in Rio de Janeiro, becoming the best time mark since July 16, 2012.

On the penultimate episode, the show obtained 30.8 points in Greater São Paulo, highest viewership rating since Morde & Assopra (2011).

The telenovela came to an end reaching more than 39 million viewers, 41 rating points and a 58% share in Brazil. This is the highest viewership since Ti Ti Ti (2010) in the 2010s decade. Also, for the first time in Globo’s history, a telenovela's final episode was broadcast on a Monday instead of the network’s traditional Friday release. Cumulatively, Totalmente Demais obtained an average of 27.4 points.

This telenovela will now be broadcast for the first time in India on Zindagi from 10 April 2017, dubbed in Hindi, under the title Total Dreamer. It will be the first Brazilian series of the network.

The series starts in Bulgaria on 6 November 2017 at 20:00 on bTV Lady.

UniMás, the sister station of Univision, aired the series beginning 13 June 2017, replacing Los Diez Mandamientos. It is dubbed in Spanish under the title Totalmente Diva.

In Greece, it was aired on Alpha TV for a week from January 21, 2019 to January 25, 2019, under the title Total Dreamer, but was cut due to low television viewing. However, starting July 1, 2019, the series will be re-viewed on the same channel.

== Awards and nominations ==
Year	Awards	Category	Nominated work	Result
2016	Troféu Internet	Best Telenovela	Rosane Svartman and Paulo Halm	Nominated
2016	Troféu Internet	Best Actress	Marina Ruy Barbosa	Nominated
2016	Troféu Internet	Best Actor	Felipe Simas	Nominated
2017	45th International Emmy Awards	Best Telenovela	Rosane Svartman and Paulo Halm	Nominated
