= Cansei =

Brazilian protest movement

Cansei (I'm tired) was a protest-movement organized by high-profile society in Brazil about lack of ethics in politics and government in the Mensalão scandal and 2006–2007 Brazilian aviation crisis. It failed to get large appeal.

== Members ==
The members of "Cansei" are popularly known as "cansados" (the tired ones). Below follows a list of members as published in the official page of the organization: Some former members later joined the Bolsonarist movement about ten years later.

- Ana Maria Braga, TV hostess
- Zezé di Camargo, singer and songwriter
- Hebe Camargo, TV hostess
- Tom Cavalcante, comedian
- Gabriel Chalita, former secretary of education of São Paulo
- Lafaiete Coutinho, former president of Banco do Brasil
- João Doria Jr., journalist, businessman and TV host
- Regina Duarte, actress
- Victor Fasano, actor
- Moacyr Franco, actor
- Lars and Torben Grael, sailors
- Léo Jaime, singer and songwriter
- Seu Jorge, singer and songwriter
- Adriana Lessa, actress
- Luana Piovani, model and actress
- Silvia Poppovic, TV hostess
- Irene Ravache, actress
- Agnaldo Rayol, singer
- Sérgio Reis, singer
- Jair Rodrigues, singer
- Patrícia Rollo, business woman
- Ivete Sangalo, singer
- Beatriz Segall, actress
- Fernando Scherer, swimmer
- Beth Szafir, business woman
- Christiane Torloni, actress
- Paulo Vilhena, actor
- Wanderléa, singer
- Paulo Zottolo, former president of Philips in Brazil.

Speculated as member

- Daniela Mercury, singer and songwriter. Mercury's involvement with "Cansei" was denied by the newspaper Folha de S.Paulo.

== Affiliated organizations ==
By July, 2007, 63 organizations were affiliated with Cansei. Among them, the OAB sections of São Paulo, Distrito Federal and Mato Grosso do Sul, the Regional Council of Engineers and Architects, the Brazilian Association of Odontology, the ABERT, the Federation of the Industries of São Paulo, the Regional Council of Medicine, the Brazilian Alliance for Organ and Tissue Donations, the Association of Military Police Officers of São Paulo, among others.
