= Klebber Toledo =

Brazilian actor (born 1986)

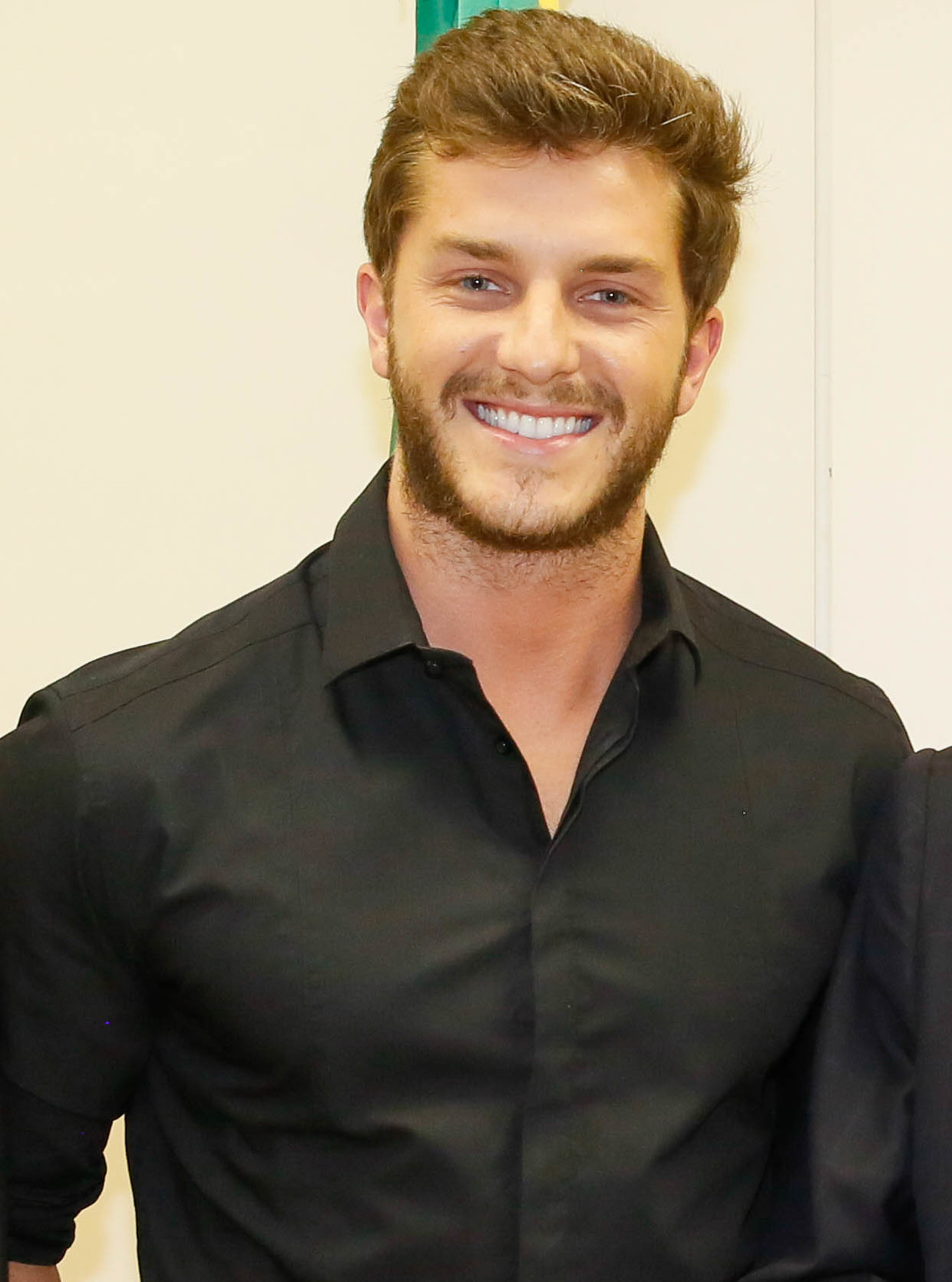
- Toledo in 2014
- Born: Klebber Toledo; 14 June 1986 (age 39); Bom Jesus dos Perdões, São Paulo, Brazil
- Occupation: Actor
- Years active: 2007–present
- Spouse: Camila Queiroz (m. 2018)

Klebber Queiroz Toledo (born 14 June 1986) is a Brazilian actor.

== Career ==
Toledo left home at the age of 15, playing volleyball at teams in São Paulo for two years, as well as working as a waiter, party monitor and modeling. At the age of 20, he went to Rio de Janeiro to participate in the Rede Globo Actors Workshop.

In November 2006, with the end of the Rede Globo workshop, he made tests for the cast of Malhação, which would debut a new phase in January 2007. He passed the tests, winning the role of Mateus Molina in the plot. His character was part of a troubled love pentagon. In 2009 he was invited to be assistant director and producer of the show that tells the life of singer Isaurinha Garcia, the musical Isaurinha - Samba, Jazz & Bossa Nova of Júlio Fischer. In the same year, he dubbed the character Noah Curtis in the movie 2012.

He returns to Rede Globo in November 2009, where he participated in the final chapters of the soap opera Caras & Bocas as Sid, a homosexual. Due to his performance in the previous novel, in 2011 the author Walcyr Carrasco scale him to a character fixed in Morde & Assopra, playing the villain Guilherme.

In 2012, he joined the cast of A Vida da Gente, playing João. In the same year, the actor enters the soap opera Lado a Lado, playing Umberto, a playboy who likes older women. In 2013, he participated in the 10th edition of the Dança dos Famosos, being in 4th place.

In 2014, he is cast for Falso Brilhante, being initially quoted to play Roberto (but Rômulo Neto was the one who got the character), brother of Maria Ísis (Marina Ruy Barbosa). However, due to the changes the novel happened to be called Império and Klebber made a character that maintains a case with the personage of Jose Mayer.

In August 2014, Toledo began to record Ato Falho, a Gshow web series, Rede Globo's website, which was launched on September 10, 2014.

In 2015 he participated in the Brazilian comedy film Vai Que Cola, which premiered on October 1, playing himself. Also in 2015 he appeared with the play "Where Are You Now" playing Gabriel, Pedro's best friend.

The following year, he was cast in the soap opera Êta Mundo Bom! playing Romeu. In 2017, he participated in the first phase of the series A Fórmula, interpreting the protagonist Ricardo Montenegro.

== Personal life ==
Klebber is the son of Maria Aparecida da Silva and José Roberto Toledo and has an older brother named Kristhiano.

During filming of the TV series Morde & Assopra, in 2011, he began dating actress Marina Ruy Barbosa, his romantic co-star. In August 2014, two weeks after the debut of the series Império, in which both acted, the couple announced the end of their relationship.

In August of 2016 he started dating actress Camila Queiroz, with whom he starred in the telenovela Êta Mundo Bom!. They became engaged in June 2017. On June 16, 2018, they celebrated their civil wedding in Ribeirão Preto. His wife took his surname, Toledo, and Klebber took hers, Queiroz.

== Filmography ==
Television
| Year | Title | Role |
|---|---|---|
| 2006 | Sinhá Moça | Rodolfo's Friend |
| 2007 | Malhação | Mateus |
| 2009–10 | Caras & Bocas | Sid |
| 2011 | Morde & Assopra | Guilherme |
| 2012 | A Vida da Gente | João |
| 2012–13 | Lado a Lado | Umberto |
| 2013 | Dança dos Famosos 10 | Himself |
| 2014–15 | Império | Leonardo |
| 2016 | Êta Mundo Bom! | Romeu Lobato |
| 2017 | A Fórmula | Ricardo Montenegro (Jovem) |
| 2017 | Cidade Proibida | Dado |
| 2018 | Ilha de Ferro | Bruno Giordano |
| 2019 | Verão 90 | Patrick Vandembergh Brasil |

Film
| Year | Title | Role |
|---|---|---|
| 2016 | Vai Que Cola - O Filme | Himself |
| 2017 | Real: O Plano por Trás da História | Marcelo |

== Theater ==
| Year | Title | Role |
|---|---|---|
| 2012 | Fama | Nick Piazza |
