= Paulo Rocha (actor) =

Portuguese actor

- Born: Paulo Jorge Rodrigues Rocha; 27 May 1977 (age 48); Setúbal, Portugal
- Occupation: Actor
- Years active: 1997–present
- Children: 1

Paulo Jorge Rodrigues Rocha (born 27 May 1977) is a Portuguese actor. He made his debut in Brazilian telenovelas in 2011 after starring in Fina Estampa.

== Filmography ==
Year	Title	Role
2001	A Senhora das Águas	Rodrigo dos Ramos Salgueiro
2002	Fábrica de Anedotas	Vários papéis
2002–03	O Olhar da Serpente	Démetrio
2003	Coração Malandro	Pedro Teixeira
2003	O Teu Olhar	Duarte Silvestre
2003	Ana E os Sete	
2004	Maré Alta	Ship Passenger
2004	O Prédio do Vasco	Doctor
2004	Inspector Max (Ep: "O Concerto")	Nuno
2005	Ninguém Como Tu	Rafael
2005	Morangos com Açúcar	Frederico "Fred" Oliveira
2007	Vingança	Rodrigo Lacerda
2007–08	Resistirei	Diogo Moreno
2008–09	Podia Acabar o Mundo	Helder
2009–2010	Perfeito Coração	Vasco Cardoso
2010	Sedução	Danilo Mascarenhas
2011	Fina Estampa	Guaracy Martins
2012	Guerra dos Sexos	Fábio Marino
2013	Didi, O Peregrino	Cacá
2014	Império	Orville Neto
2015	Totalmente Demais	Erondino Machado (Dino)
2019	Éramos Seis	Felício de Souza
2024	Mania de Você	Volney
2026	Páginas da Vida	Gil Rodrigues

== Awards and nominations ==
Year	Awards	Category	Nominated work	Result	Ref.
2010	Troféus TV 7 Dias	Best Actor	Perfeito Coração	Nominated	
2011	Melhores do Ano	Best Newcomer Actor	Fina Estampa	Nominated	
2012	Prêmio Contigo! de TV	Best Newcomer	Fina Estampa	Nominated	
2013	CinEuphoria Awards	Best Supporting Actor - National Competition	Noiva Precisa-se	Won	
