= Hebe Camargo =

Brazilian television host (1929–2012)

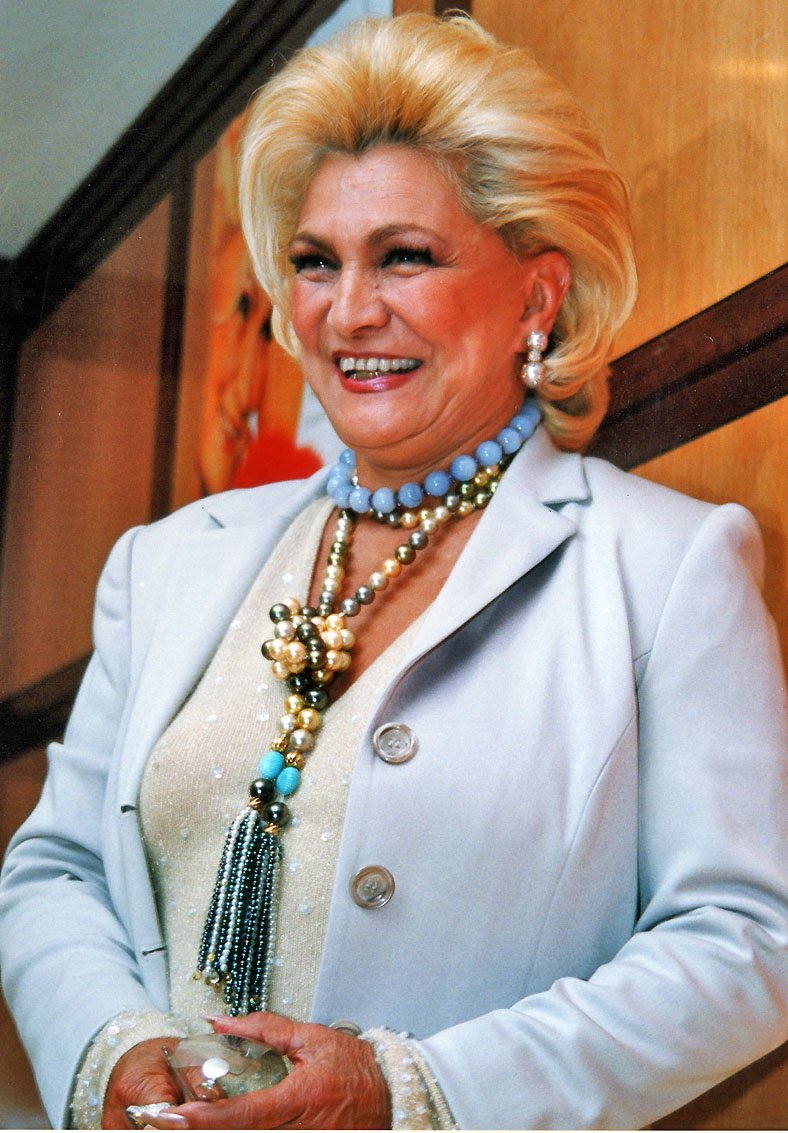
- Camargo in December 2006
- Born: Hebe Maria Monteiro de Camargo; 8 March 1929; Taubaté, São Paulo, Brazil
- Died: 29 September 2012 (aged 83); São Paulo, Brazil
- Other name: Rainha da Televisão Brasileira: Loiruda
- Occupations: Presenter, humorist, actress, singer
- Years active: 1943–2012
- Height: 1.60 m (5 ft 3 in)
- Spouse(s): Décio Capuano (m. 1964; div. 1971) Lélio Ravagnani (m. 1973; died 2000)
- Children: 1
- Musical career
- Genres: Jazz; latin jazz; latin music; pop music; MPB; Romantic music
- Labels: Odeon Records; Polydor Records; Mercury Records; PolyGram; Philips Records; Universal Music Group; Sony Music
- Website: Official website

Hebe Maria Monteiro de Camargo Ravagnani DmSE • Dama Oficial • DmIH (Portuguese pronunciation: [ˈɛbi mɐˈɾi.ɐ mõˈtejɾu dʒi kɐˈmaʁɡu ˌʁavɐˈɲɐ̃ni]; 8 March 1929 – 29 September 2012) was a Brazilian television host, singer and actress. She is considered the "Queen of Brazilian Television" (Portuguese: Rainha da Televisão Brasileira).

Camargo began her career as a singer in the 1940s before transitioning to radio and television. As a singer, Camargo appeared in comedy films by Mazzaropi. In the 1950s, she entered television and worked as a presenter in a series on TV Paulista and appear on the weekday program, O Mundo é das Mulheres (The World Belongs to Women). In the 1960s, Camargo moved to the Rede Record network. In 1966, the network began broadcasting a Sunday program featuring Camargo as an interviewer. Camargo was seen on almost every television station in Brazil, including the Rede Record and Rede Bandeirantes, in the 1970s and 1980s. In 1980, after a long hiatus she returned to work as an interviewer. From 1986 to 2010, Camargo was on the SBT Network, where she presented the television programs Hebe and Fora do Ar.

In 1995, EMI released a CD of Camargo's greatest hits and, in 2006, she celebrated her thousandth program on the SBT. Camargo died at her home on 29 September 2012. Her net worth was over US$360 million. She was a São Paulo FC fan.

== Early years ==
Hebe Camargo was born on the International Women's Day of 1929, in Taubaté, São Paulo, was the daughter of Esther Magalhães Camargo and Sigesfredo Monteiro de Camargo, both of Portuguese origin, She began her career as a singer in the 1940s with her sister Estela, as Rosalinda e Florisbela. During her singing career, Camargo performed sambas and boleros in nightclubs. She left her musical career to devote more time to radio and television. She was invited by Assis Chateaubriand to attend the first live broadcast of Brazilian television, in the neighborhood of Sumaré, São Paulo, Brazil.

== Career ==
As a singer, Camargo appeared in comedy films by Mazzaropi and starred with Agnaldo Rayol in one of them. In the 1950s, she entered television and worked as a presenter in a series on TV Paulista. In 1955, Camargo appeared in the first program for women on Brazilian television, O Mundo é das Mulheres (The World belongs to Women), on television in Rio de Janeiro, which aired five times a week.

In the 1960s, Camargo moved to the Rede Record network, where, for many years, she maintained a top-rated program. During the Jovem Guarda era, Hebe gave way to new talent. On 10 April 1966, the network began broadcasting a Sunday program featuring Camargo as an interviewer. This show was sponsored by the Brazilian airline, Varig, with an advertising featuring Camargo.

Camargo was seen on almost every television station in Brazil, including the Rede Record and Rede Bandeirantes, in the 1970s and 1980s.

In 1980, after a long hiatus she returned to work as an interviewer. From March 1986 to December 2010, Camargo was on the SBT Network, where she presented the television program Hebe, which became one of the network's longest-running programs. The show was also broadcast on Rede Tupi and Rede Bandeirantes, and had a spin-off show Hebe por Elas (Hebe for Them) in the early 1990s. She also presented Fora do Ar, and participated in Telethon, comedy specials, and Romeu e Julieta, in which she starred with Ronald Golias and Nair Bello.

In 1995, EMI released a CD of Camargo's greatest hits. On 22 April 2006, she celebrated her thousandth program on the SBT. She also has participated in social activities, such as taking part in the Cansei movement, a 2007 protest critical of the Brazilian government.

== Illness and death ==
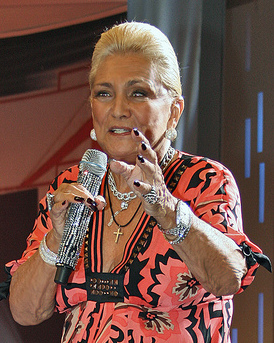
Camargo in 2009

Camargo was spending New Year's Eve in Miami when she complained of severe abdominal pain. A bulletin issued by the hospital later reported that Hebe was subjected to a diagnostic laparoscopy, which found cancer. On 8 January 2010, Camargo was admitted to the Albert Einstein Hospital in São Paulo for surgery to remove cancer from the peritoneum. After surgery and chemotherapy, she returned to work on the International Women's Day of 2010, her 81st birthday.

Camargo died on 29 September 2012 at 11:45 BRT, having probably suffered a cardiac arrest while she was sleeping.

== On popular culture ==
- Marcus Baby gained media attention when he refused to sell a doll he had created in the likeness of Hebe Camargo.
- Hebe, O Musical was a theatrical production directed by Miguel Falabella and performed by Débora Reis from January to April 2018.
- Hebe: A Estrela do Brasil (2019) is a movie based on Hebe's life journey and career. It would be produced and directed by Carlos Diegues, but afterward, Maurício Farias replaced him. Actress Andréa Beltrão portrays the presenter and actor Daniel Boaventura portrays Silvio Santos.
- Hebe pra sempre (2019) – on display until 2 June 2019 in Farol Santander, in São Paulo. The immersive and interactive exhibition remembers the career of the singer and presenter that left a mark in the history of Brazilian television.

== Awards and honors ==
- 1990 — "The face of São Paulo"
- 1994 — "Citizen Paulistana" from the Câmara Municipal
- 2002 — "Tribute in Portugal"
- 2007 — "Special Award", for Prêmio Contigo!
- 2009 — "Title of Professor Honoris Causa" of the Universidade FIAM-FAAM
- 2010 — "Award LIDE 2010" of the Comitê Executivo do Grupo de Líderes Empresariais
- 2010 — "Latin Grammy Awards- Trustees Award"
- "Best Interview" of the Associação Paulista dos Críticos de Artes
- "Best auditorium program presenter" of the Brazilian Academy of Letters

== Filmography ==
- 2009 – Xuxa e o Mistério de Feiurinha
- 2005 – Coisa de Mulher
- 2000 – Dinosaur (Portuguese dubbing of Baylene)
- 1960 – Zé do Periquito
- 1951 – Liana, a Pecadora
- 1949 – Quase no Céu

=== Television career ===
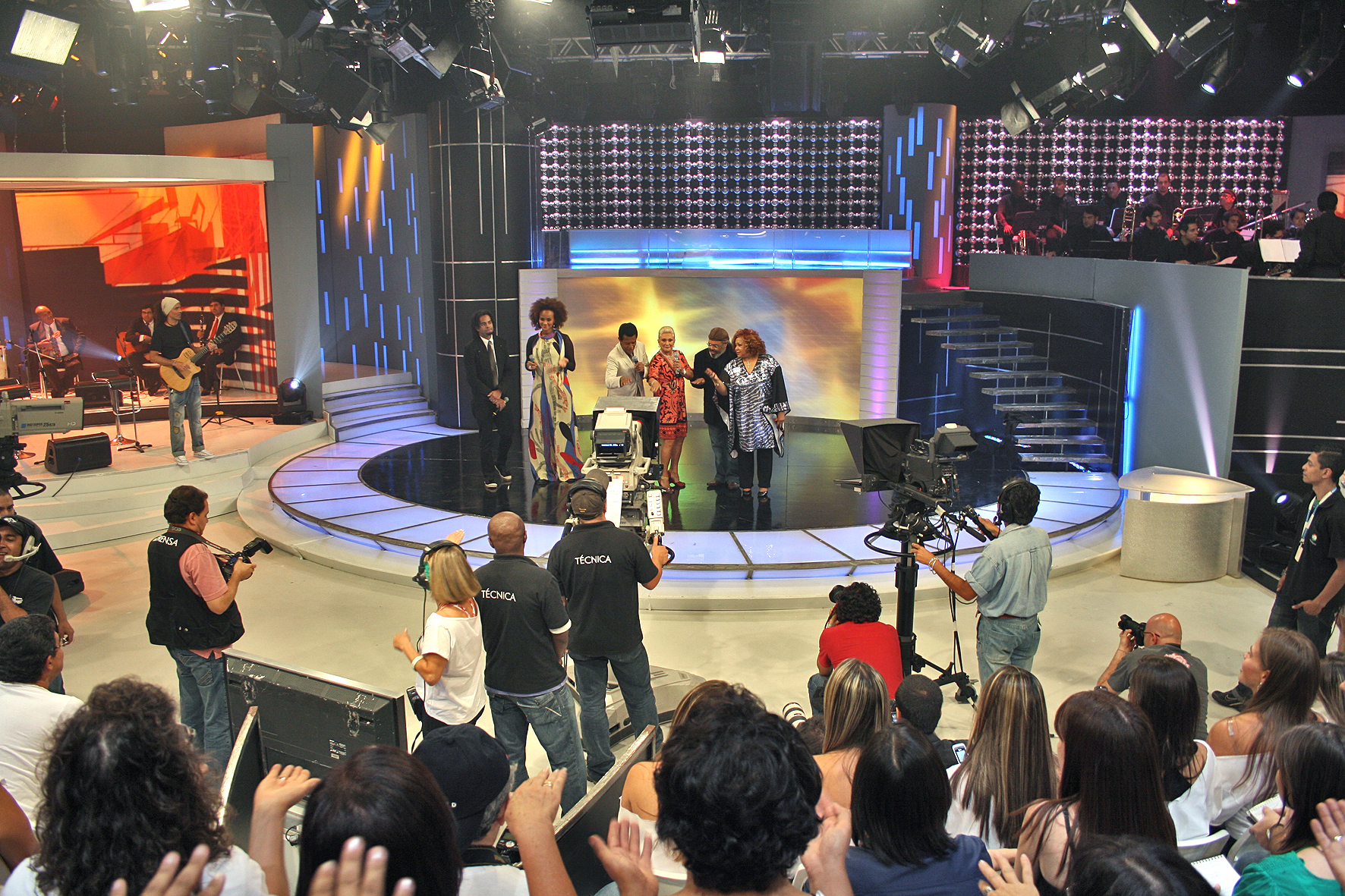
Studio of Hebe program

- 2010 – Fantástico
- 2010 – SBT Brasil
- 2009 – Elas Cantam Roberto
- 2009 – Vende-se Um Véu de Noiva
- 2007 – Amigas e Rivais
- 2003 – Romeu e Julieta Versão 3
- 2000 – TV Ano 50
- 1995 – A Escolinha do Golias
- 1990 – Romeu e Julieta Versão 2
- 1980 – Cavalo Amarelo
- 1978 – O Profeta
- 1970 – As Pupilas do Senhor Reitor
- 1968 – Romeu e Julieta Versão 1
- 1950 – Primeira Apresentação Musical da TV Brasileira

== Discography ==
- Sou Eu (1960)
- Hebe comanda o espetáculo (1961)
- E Vocês (1963)
- Hebe (1964)
- Hebe 65 (1965)
- Hebe (1967)
- Pra Você (1998)
- Hebe Camargo & Convidados (2001)
- Hebe Mulher e Amigos (2010)
- Mulher (2010)

== See also ==
- List of television presenters
