= Império =

Brazilian telenovela

- Created by: Aguinaldo Silva
- Directed by: Rogério Gomes
- Starring: Alexandre Nero; Lília Cabral; Leandra Leal; Marina Ruy Barbosa; Drica Moraes; Caio Blat; Andreia Horta; Daniel Rocha; Maria Ribeiro; Malu Galli; Drica Moraes; Rafael Cardoso; Erom Cordeiro; Nanda Costa; Flávio Galvão; José Mayer; Othon Bastos; Roberto Pirillo; Marjorie Estiano; Klebber Toledo see more
- Opening theme: "Lucy in the Sky with Diamonds" by Dan Torres
- Country of origin: Brazil
- Original language: Portuguese
- No. of episodes: 203; 170 (International version)

Production
- Cinematography: Fernando Silva Santos
- Editor: Tainá Monteiro
- Camera setup: Multi-camera
- Running time: 55 minutes (with commercials); 35 minutes (Wednesdays)

Original release
- Network: TV Globo
- Release: 21 July 2014 – 13 March 2015

Império (Portuguese pronunciation: [ĩˈpɛɾju]; English: Empire) is a Brazilian primetime telenovela produced and broadcast by TV Globo from 21 July 2014 to 13 March 2015.

Written by Aguinaldo Silva, and directed by Rogério Gomes. Starring Alexandre Nero, Lília Cabral, Leandra Leal, Caio Blat, Andreia Horta, Daniel Rocha, Nanda Costa, Marina Ruy Barbosa, Rafael Cardoso, José Mayer, Marjorie Estiano and Drica Moraes.

The telenovela was watched daily by over than 30 million viewers per minute, a number greater than some of the NFL games on US television.

In 2015, the show was awarded with the International Emmy Award for Best Telenovela at the 43rd International Emmy Awards.

== Synopsis ==
The shows intertitle

1st phase

The plot brings the male protagonist as rude heartthrob José Alfredo (Chay Suede), a boy who leaves Recife in 1989 to try life in Rio de Janeiro, and during stay in the house of his brother, Evaldo (Thiago Martins), if madly in love coined by itself, Eliane (Vanessa Giacomo), older than him. The lovers decide to flee the state capital to have a life together happily, without having more than live with the shadow of Evaldo. Each writes a letter telling what happened and combine to deliver the cuckolded husband, leaving it to him to read only when the two were already far away. Unfortunately the girl discovers to be pregnant, and Cora (Marjorie Estiano), sister Eliane poisons the girl against Jose Alfredo, who is also the brother of Josué (Alejandro Claveaux), leaving the boy to see ships in the road of this marvelous city.

Alone, José Alfredo part into the unknown and ends up being displayed in the middle of the journey, Sebastian (Reginaldo Faria), suggesting that the boy begins to work with the exploitation of precious stones. Sebastião José Alfredo then decides to take to Switzerland. On the plane, José Alfredo will meet Marta Maria (Adriana Birolli), one from traditional decadent young family, but he sees it as a chance to get your name known in high society and marries her. José Alfredo will also know the Portuguese businesswoman Maria Joaquina Braga (Regina Duarte), which will seep into the smuggling of precious stones market, means by which money appears easier and quicker than the slow and honest toil in their view. Because of the construction of its supposed empire, José Alfredo even be able to kill a man.

2nd phase

Years later, José Alfredo (Alexandre Nero) is separated from Maria Marta (Lilia Cabral), who devotes his life to demonize her ex-husband and the three children try to put to work in the Jewelry Empire project launched by José Alfredo, the millionaire left, in order that it may divert cash ex-husband, leave him bankrupt and feel vindicated. The three sons of the former couple are the cult jewelry designer Maria Clara (Andreia Horta), the ambitious José Pedro (Caio Blat), and the rebel João Lucas (Daniel Rocha). While all this happens, José Alfredo is dedicated to performing expeditions around the world and to meet with his mistress Maria Isis (Marina Ruy Barbosa), one of the interior northeast nymphets who dreams of being a model, but is designed by Mother Magnolia (Zezé Polessa) by father Severo (Tato Gabus Mendes) and brother Roberto (Romulo Neto) to take money from José Alfredo.

The fall of the empire of José Alfredo begins when a powerful pink diamond from South Africa, a symbol of status and power, disappeared on Mount Roraima. In his mystical vision, José Alfredo believes everything falls apart if he does not find your favorite gemstone and get rid of a shiny faux stayed in place. Compounding the ordeal of him, his sister's ex-lover, Cora (Drica Moraes), will reappear stating that Cristina (Leandra Leal) is his bastard daughter Eliane (Malu Galli). The scrappy girl camelódromo works in the center of Rio de Janeiro alone and creates little Victor (Adriano Alves), son of Tuane (Nanda Costa) and his brother Elivaldo (Rafael Losso). Tuane abandoned infant son with her ex-boyfriend and Cristina to go after a rich husband. An accident causes the death of two people and blamed for what happened, Elivaldo ends up being arrested. Meanwhile, Eliane gets sick and dies and debts in camelódromo only accumulate, to the despair of Cristina, who is pressured by Cora demanding their share in the inheritance of the biological father. José Alfredo, however, does not accept recognize her as a daughter, Cristina refuses to have any kind of relationship with the true family or fortune they have amassed. Marta Maria Cristina will do anything to keep away from her husband and her children, rivaling no less dangerous Cora.

Cristina is the girlfriend of simpleton lawyer Fernando (Erom Cordeiro), but their relationship is cold and loveless. Her heart stops beating stronger when she finds a love of childhood, honest Vicente (Rafael Cardoso), an excellent chef who starts working on the arrogant Enrico (Joaquim Lopes), fiancé of Maria Clara restaurant. Cristina Vicente never forgot, but the romance of the two will be setbacks obsessive jealousy of the young Fernando, which will haunt her after the breakup of the two, and also the strong interest that Maria Clara's sister Cristina, nourished by Vicente.

Enrico is the son of Claudius Bolgari (José Mayer), a renowned party organizer of Rio's high society, with quiet Beatriz (Suzy Rêgo). What nobody suspects is that Claudius is bisexual and keeps a secret romance with the passionate and naive Leonardo (Klebber Toledo), who suffers for failing to move up the career as an actor and not have their relationship recognized by Claudio. The two become infernizados by Teo Pereira (Paulo Betti), a journalist who had studied with Claudio affected in adolescence and is surprised to see him leading a heterosexual life, has always believed that his friend was gay. Teo owns a gossip blog about subcelebridades and will aim at exposing the inner life of Claudius for everyone, despite the strong homophobia Enrico shall demonstrate day after day, scaring his father.

Another prominent parallel plot involves Popular Juju (Cris Vianna), former Queen of battery of a samba school who abandoned his career to devote to family. But her husband, artist Orville (Paulo Rocha) is a dishonest forger who ends up having his schemes discovered early in the plot. With her husband in prison, Juju is forced to sell the house to pay their own attorney Carmen (Ana Carolina Dias), a temptress and evil character who cares about Orville and convinces him to abandon Juju to stick with it. When it gets out of jail, Orville goes to live in the former home of Juju side of Carmen, while the ex-queen battery is without a place to live with their young son. Already count|

== Production ==
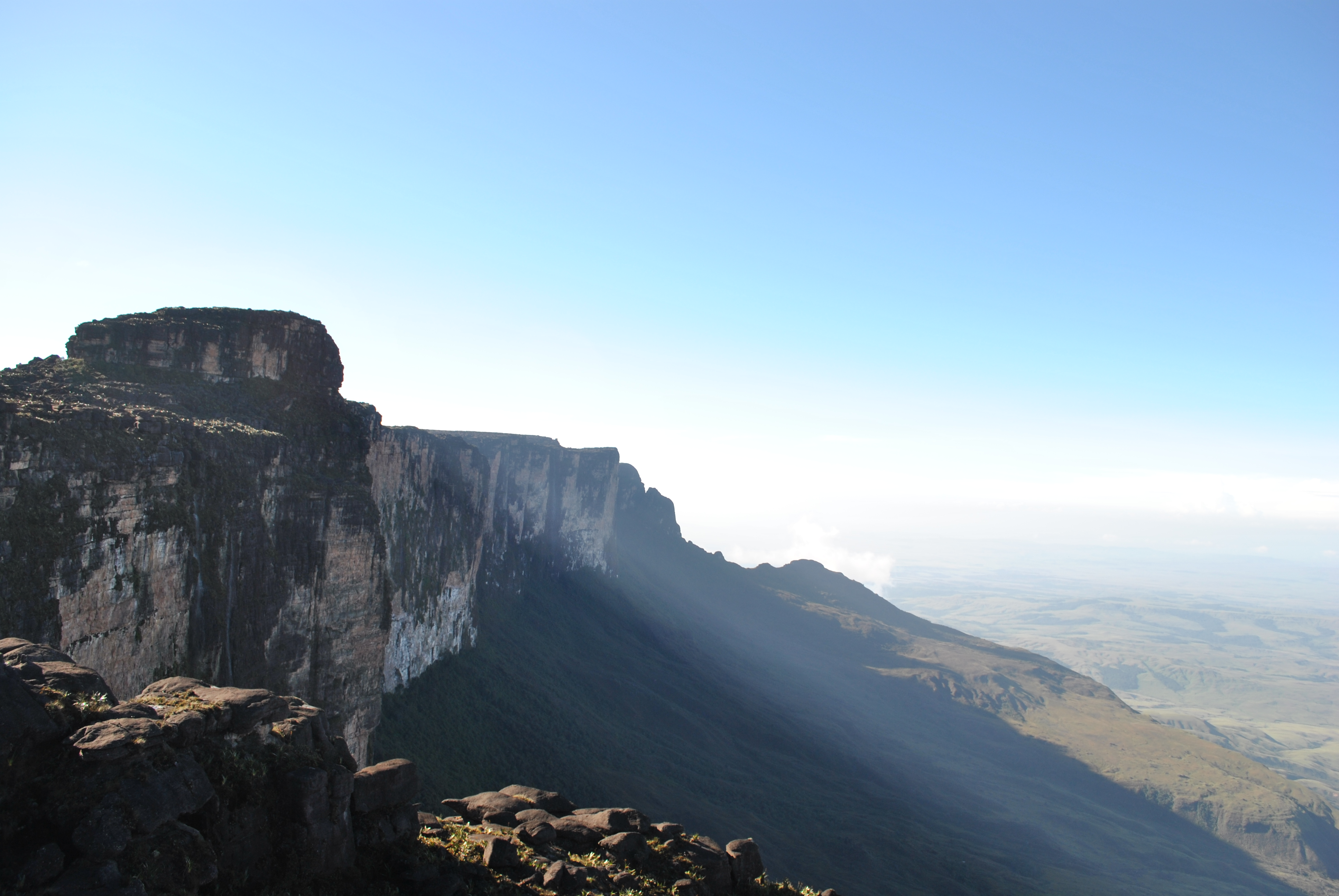
Mount Roraima served as the site of setting for Império.

Zurich, Petrópolis and Carrancas (MG) served as locations for shooting scenes of the first phase of Império. The author of the telenovela, Aguinaldo Silva, had plans to acclimatise the telenovela in Serra Pelada. However, the station showed a series of the same name at the time, which made him change his mind. So Silva chose to use the Venezuelan part of Mount Roraima. However, since the film crews was denied, and filming ended occurring in the Brazilian part of the Mount.

Most critics specialized in television in Brazil considered "bold" the choice of the protagonist of the soap opera, Alexandre Nero. In an interview, Silva said the character was inspired by himself.

== Cast ==
Poster used to promote the premiere of Império, featuring a photo of the main characters.

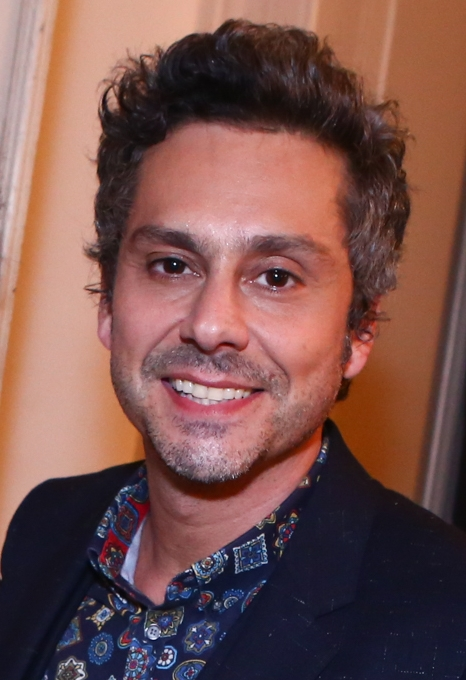
Alexandre Nero plays the protagonist Commander José Alfredo.

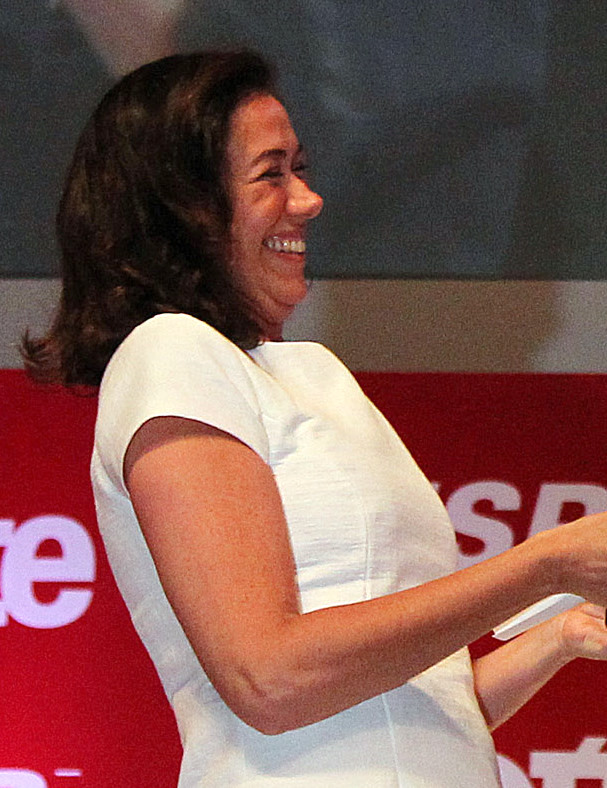
Lília Cabral plays Maria Marta

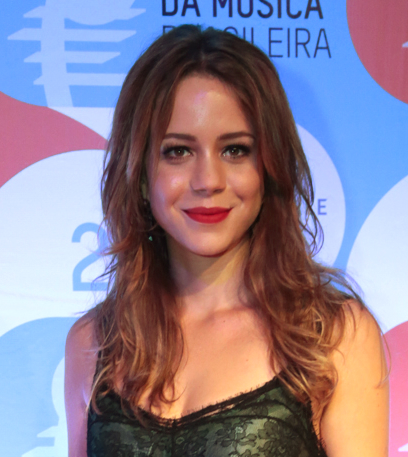
Leandra Leal plays Cristina.

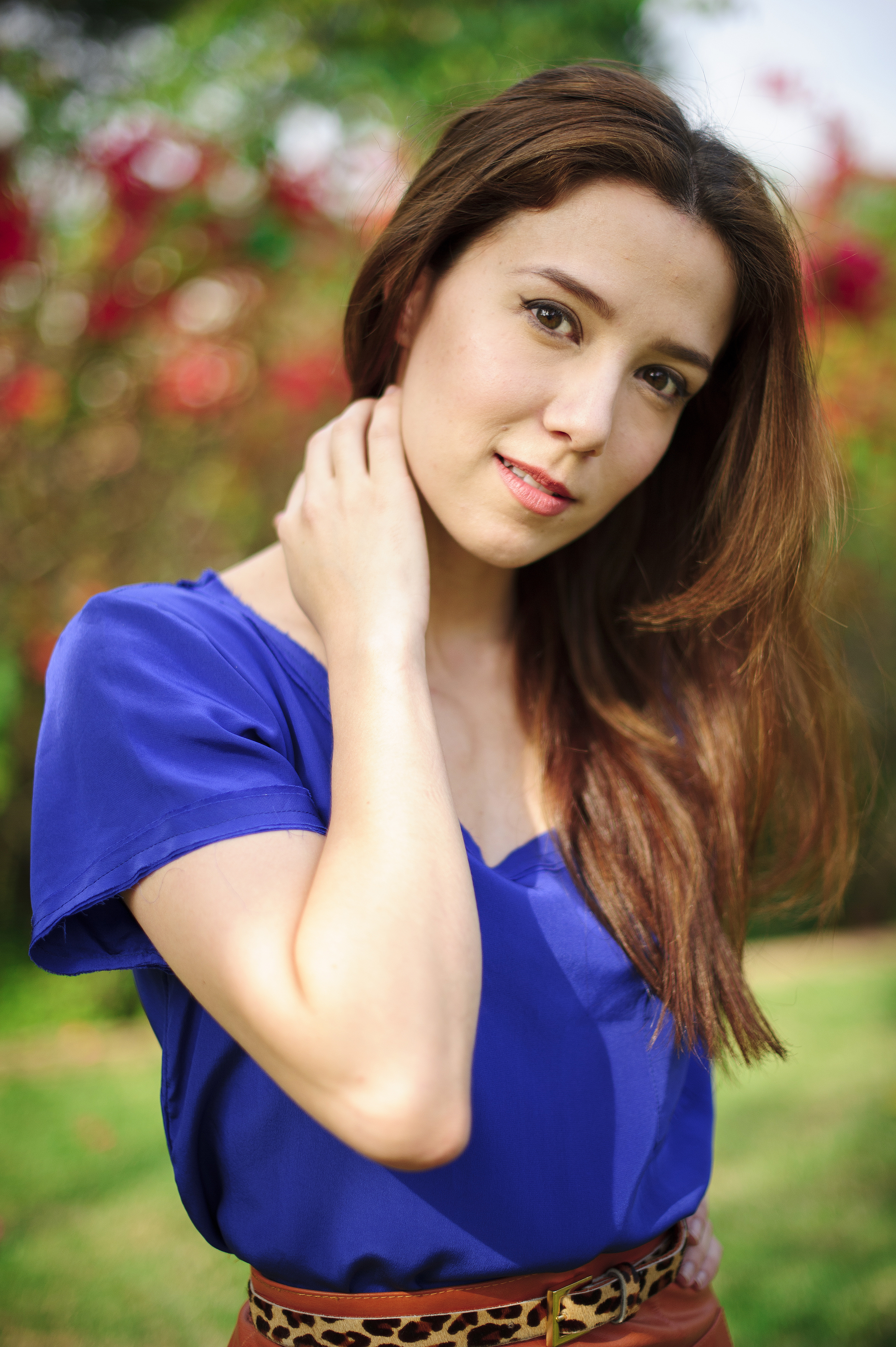
Marjorie Estiano plays Cora.

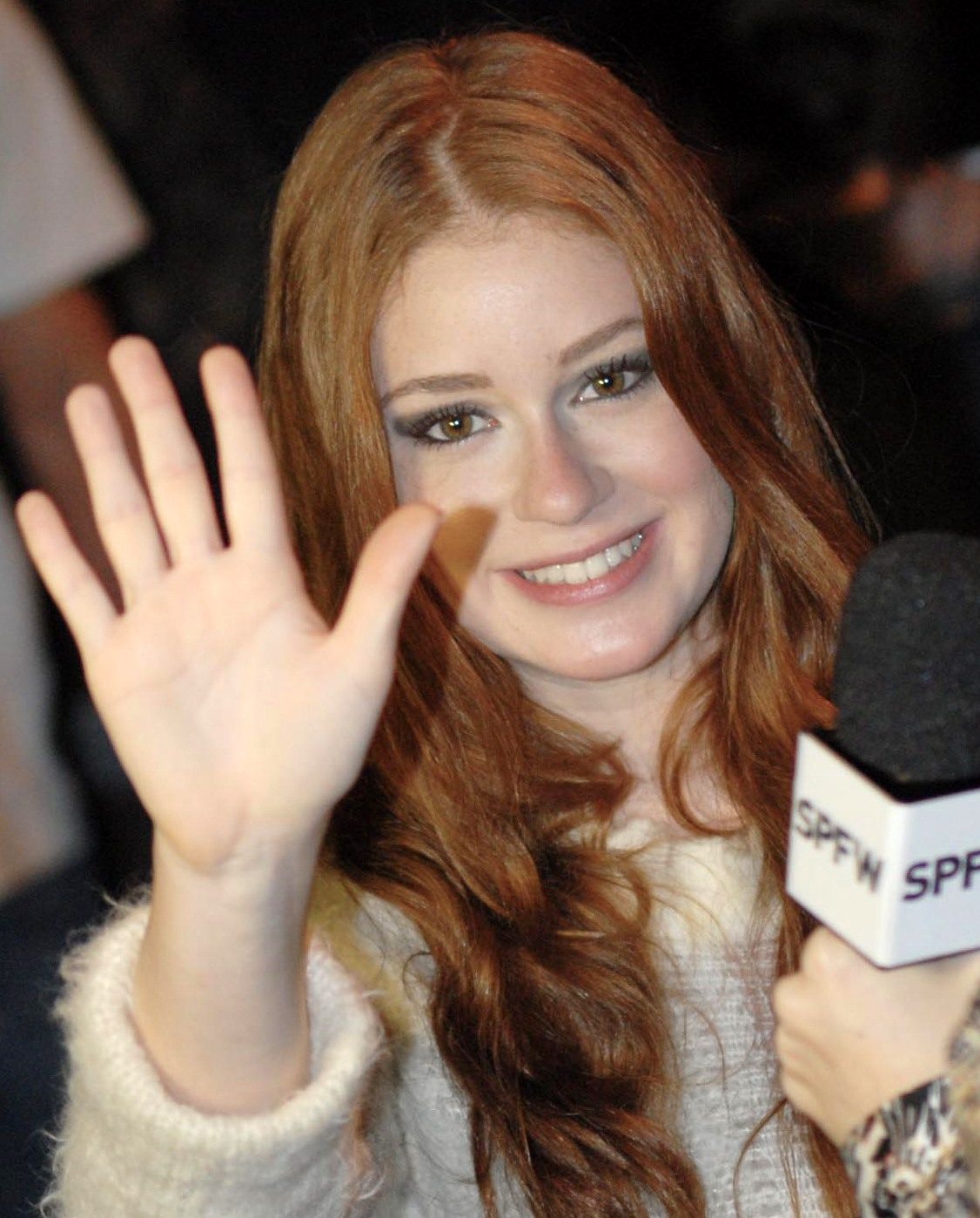
Marina Ruy Barbosa plays Maria Ísis.

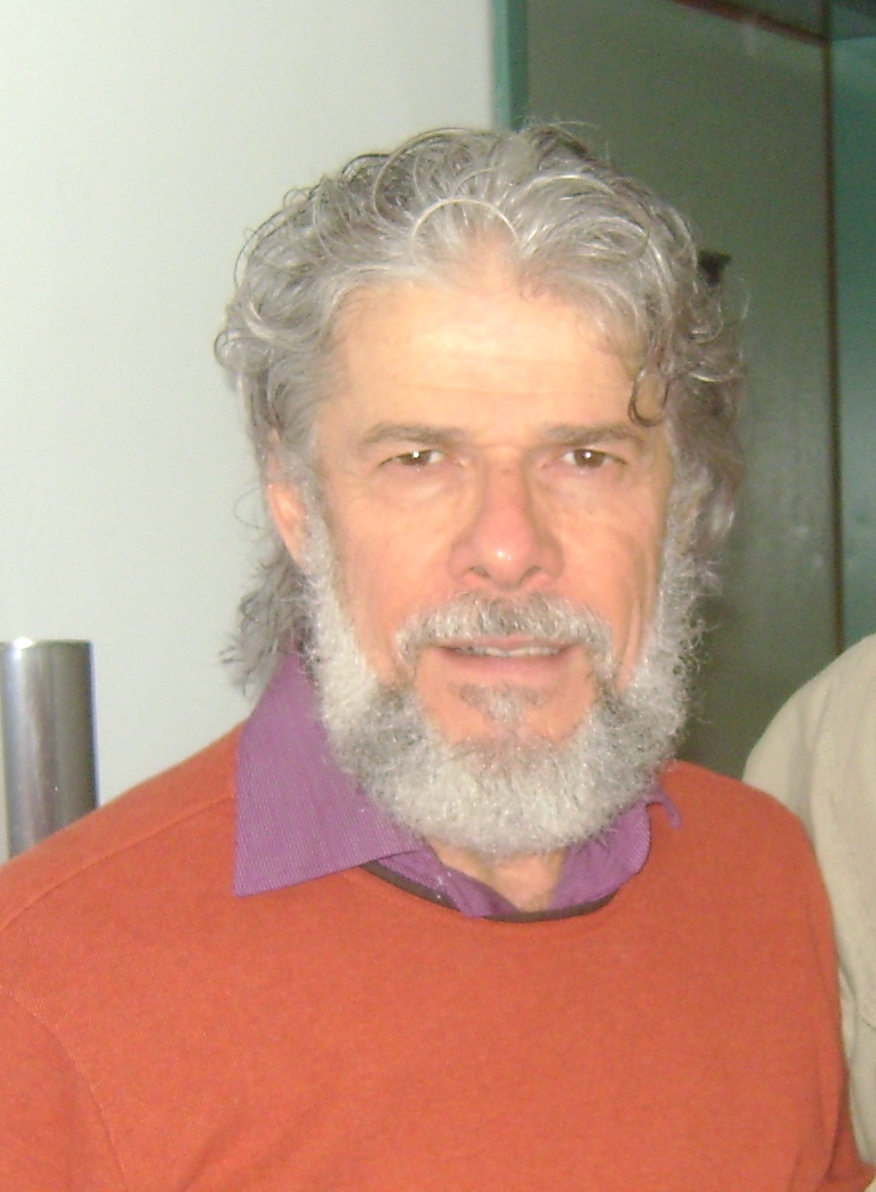
José Mayer plays Cláudio.

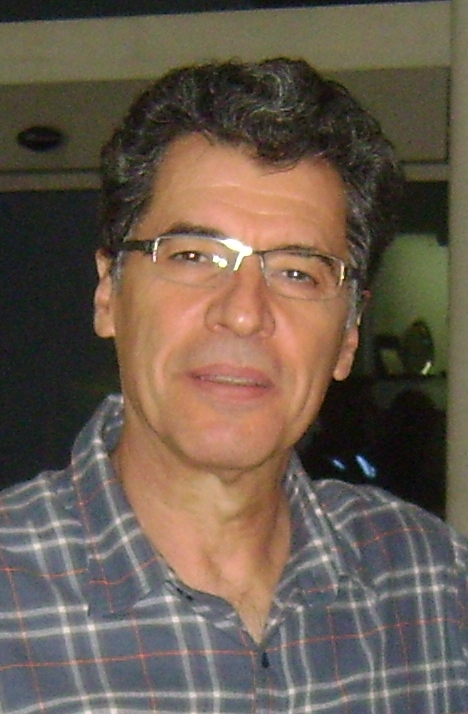
Paulo Betti plays Téo Pereira.

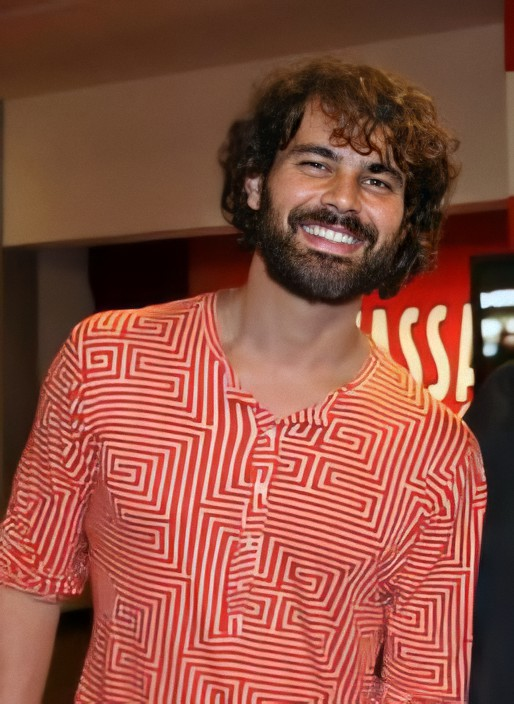
Carmo Dalla Vecchia plays Maurílio.

Actor/Actress	Character
Alexandre Nero	Commander José Alfredo de Medeiros (Zé Alfredo)
Lília Cabral	Maria Marta Medeiros de Mendonça e Albuquerque
Leandra Leal	Cristina dos Anjos Bastos Medeiros
Drica Moraes	Cora dos Anjos Bastos
Marjorie Estiano	Cora dos Anjos Bastos
Daniel Rocha	João Lucas Medeiros de Mendonça e Albuquerque
Andreia Horta	Maria Clara Medeiros de Mendonça e Albuquerque
Caio Blat	José Pedro Medeiros de Mendonça e Albuquerque
Josie Pessoa	Eduarda Botticelli Medeiros de Mendonça e Albuquerque (Du)
Marina Ruy Barbosa	Maria Isis Ferreira da Costa
Rafael Cardoso	Vicente Ferreira da Silva
José Mayer	Cláudio Bolgari Nascimento
Paulo Betti	Teodoro Pereira (Téo)
Carmo Dalla Vecchia	Maurílio Ferreira
Maria Ribeiro	Danielle Falcão Medeiros de Mendonça e Albuquerque
Ailton Graça	Xana Summer (Adalberto da Silva)
Zezé Polessa	Magnólia Ferreira da Costa
Tato Gabus Mendes	Severo Ferreira da Costa
Nanda Costa	Tuane da Conceição
Lais Pinho	Noely
Joaquim Lopes	Enrico Bolgari Nascimento
Klebber Toledo	Leonardo de Souza
Adriana Birolli	Amanda de Mendonça e Albuquerque
Adriana Birolli	Maria Marta de Mendonça e Albuquerque (1ª Fase)
Suzy Rêgo	Beatriz Bolgari Nascimento
Cris Vianna	Juliane Matos (Juju Popular)
Flávio Galvão	Reginaldo dos Santos
Othon Bastos	Renato Silviano dos Santos Muniz (Silviano)
Paulo Rocha	Orville Neto
Elizângela	Jurema dos Santos
Viviane Araújo	Natália (Naná)
Paulo Vilhena	Domingos Salvador
Dani Barros	Lorraine
Roberto Bomfim	Antônio Batista (Antoninho)
Roberto Pirillo	Dr. Merival Porto
Rômulo Neto	Roberto Ferreira da Costa (Robertão)
Erom Cordeiro	Fernando
Ana Carolina Dias	Carmen Godinho
Roberto Birindelli	Josué
Lucci Ferreira	Antônio
Letícia Birkheuer	Érika von Furstemberg
Rafael Losso	Elivaldo dos Anjos Bastos Medeiros
Lidi Lisboa	Kelly
Juliana Boller	Bianca Bolgari Nascimento
Jonas Torres	Ismael
Karen Junqueira	Fernanda
Júlia Fajardo	Helena Abrantes
Júlio Machado	Jairo dos Santos
Ravel Andrade	Otoniel dos Santos
Adriano Alves	Victor da Conceição Medeiros
Kiria Malheiros	Bruna Falcão
Nicollas Paixão	Orville Júnior
Júlia Belmont	Stephany
Ludmila Rosa	Karina
Paulo Vespúcio	Giancarlo Baldessari
Jackson Antunes	Manoel
Elaine Mickely	Xênia
André Gonçalves	Etevaldo
Ítalo Guerra	Luigi
Laura Cardoso	Jesuína Ferreira
Leanddro Rocha	Brigel
Ravel Cabral	Mário Cardoso (Cardoso)
Luca de Castro	Jonas Podansky
Rhaisa Batista	Luiza
Ana Paula Botelho	Valquíria
Kelzy Ecard	Teresa
Yago Machado	Luciano
Raphael Viana	Arnaldo (Arnoldão)
Marcelo Cavalcanti	André
Nicola Siri	Dionísio
Mabel Cezar	Adelaide Siqueira
Ivan Capúa	Wilson Grey
Simon Petracchi	Espinoza
João Lima Jr.	Mário Sérgio
Júlio Levy	Kleber
Jack Berraquero	Wilson
Lucilia de Assis	Zezé
William Vita	José Carlos
Eduardo Spinetti	Pietro
Hugo Esteves	Patrício
Léo Wainer	Omar
Luciana Pacheco	Marisa
Luciana Malcher	Claraíde
Joe Ribeiro	Marcos (Marcão)
José Negreiros	Batista
Laercio Fonseca	Felipe
Márcia do Valle	Isabela (Isa)
Manoel Elizário	Emanuel
Rosana Dias	Madalena
Malu Galli	Eliane dos Anjos Bastos Medeiros
Chay Suede	José Alfredo Medeiros (1st phase)
Vanessa Giácomo	Eliane dos Anjos Bastos Medeiros (1st phase)
Regina Duarte	Maria Joaquina Braga (1st phase)
Reginaldo Faria	Sebastião Ferreira (1st phase)
Thiago Martins	Evaldo Medeiros (1st phase)
Alejandro Claveaux	Josué (1st phase)
Ed Oliveira	Bigode (1st phase)
Romis Ferreira	Renato Silviano dos Santos Muniz (Silviano) (1ª Fase)
Júlia Svacinna	Cristina dos Anjos Bastos Medeiros (1st phase)
João Victor Salles	Elivaldo dos Anjos Bastos Medeiros (1st phase)

== Reception ==
=== Ratings ===
Timeslot	Episodes	Premiere		Finale		Rank	Season	Rating average
Timeslot	Episodes	Date	Viewers (in points)	Date	Viewers (in points)	Rank	Season	Rating average
Mondays—Saturdays; 9:15pm	203	21 July 2014	32	13 March 2015	46	#1	2014–15	32.71

Despite the positive impact, the first chapter of Império registered 32 points in São Paulo and 34 points in Rio de Janeiro, according to Ibope, the second worst debut of a 9PM telenovela in all time, besides Babilônia. However, TV Globo had 24,6 (4x) more points than SBT, the second most-watched station.

Despite the negative debut, the second chapter scored 35 points, with a peak of 37 and 56% share, registering a nine percent growth. Em Família, its predecessor, scored 29 points in his second chapter.

During the week of 27 October—7 November 2014, an estimate predicted that the telenovela was watched by about 101.7 million people in this period, registering 30 million viewers per minute, number greater than is registered by the NFL games on American television, which tend to record about 18.1 million viewers per minute.

On 2 March 2015 registered 40 points in São Paulo for the first time. On Tuesday (3) registered 41.

The last chapter was attended by 9,108 million viewers in Greater São Paulo, acquiring an Ibope Rating of 46.0.

=== Controversy ===
Marjorie Estiano has returned to Cora's role in the 2nd phase because Drica Moraes got sick.

=== Awards and nominations ===
Year	Award	Category	Nominated	Result
2014	Prêmio Extra de Televisão	Best Telenovela	Aguinaldo Silva	Won
2014	Prêmio Extra de Televisão	Best Lead Actress	Drica Moraes	Nominated
2014	Prêmio Extra de Televisão	Best Lead Actress	Lília Cabral	Won
2014	Prêmio Extra de Televisão	Best Lead Actor	Alexandre Nero	Won
2014	Prêmio Extra de Televisão	Best Lead Actor	Chay Suede	Nominated
2014	Prêmio Extra de Televisão	Best Supporting Actress	Marina Ruy Barbosa	Nominated
2014	Prêmio Extra de Televisão	Best Supporting Actor	Aílton Graça	Won
2014	Prêmio Extra de Televisão	Best Supporting Actor	José Mayer	Nominated
2014	Prêmio Extra de Televisão	Best Supporting Actor	Paulo Vilhena	Nominated
2014	Prêmio Extra de Televisão	Best Revelation	Dani Barros	Nominated
2014	Prêmio Extra de Televisão	Best Revelation	Viviane Araújo	Won
2014	Prêmio Extra de Televisão	Best Musical Theme	"Lucy in the Sky with Diamonds" – (Dan Torres)	Won
2014	Prêmio Extra de Televisão	Best Musical Theme	"Dona" – (Alex Cohen)	Nominated
2014	Melhores do Ano	Best Actress	Lília Cabral	Nominated
2014	Melhores do Ano	Best Actor	Alexandre Nero	Won
2014	Melhores do Ano	Best Supporting Actress	Andreia Horta	Nominated
2014	Melhores do Ano	Best Supporting Actress	Drica Moraes	Won
2014	Melhores do Ano	Best Supporting Actress	Marina Ruy Barbosa	Nominated
2014	Melhores do Ano	Best Supporting Actor	Aílton Graça	Won
2014	Melhores do Ano	Best Female Revelation	Josie Pessoa	Won
2014	Melhores do Ano	Best Male Revelation	Chay Suede	Won
2015	Troféu Imprensa	Best Telenovela	Aguinaldo Silva	Won
2015	Troféu Imprensa	Best Actress	Lília Cabral	Won
2015	Troféu Imprensa	Best Actress	Marina Ruy Barbosa	Nominated
2015	Troféu Imprensa	Best Actor	Alexandre Nero	Won
2015	Prêmio Contigo! de TV	Best Telenovela	Aguinaldo Silva	Won
2015	Prêmio Contigo! de TV	Best Author	Aguinaldo Silva	Won
2015	Prêmio Contigo! de TV	Best Actress	Lília Cabral	Won
2015	Prêmio Contigo! de TV	Best Actress	Leandra Leal	Nominated
2015	Prêmio Contigo! de TV	Best Actor	Alexandre Nero	Won
2015	Prêmio Contigo! de TV	Best Supporting Actor	Aílton Graça	Nominated
2015	Prêmio Contigo! de TV	Best Supporting Actor	Carmo Dalla Vecchia	Nominated
2015	Prêmio Contigo! de TV	Best Supporting Actor	Paulo Betti	Nominated
2015	Prêmio Contigo! de TV	Best Supporting Actor	Paulo Vilhena	Nominated
2015	Prêmio Contigo! de TV	Best Supporting Actress	Adriana Birolli	Nominated
2015	Prêmio Contigo! de TV	Best Supporting Actress	Andreia Horta	Nominated
2015	Prêmio Contigo! de TV	Best Supporting Actress	Marina Ruy Barbosa	Won
2015	Prêmio Contigo! de TV	Best Child Actress	Kiria Malheiros	Nominated
2015	Prêmio Contigo! de TV	Best Child Actor	Adriano Alves	Nominated
2015	Prêmio Contigo! de TV	Best Director	André Felipe Binder, Pedro Vasconcelos and Rogério Gomes	Nominated
2015	Prêmio Contigo! de TV	Best Revelation	Viviane Araújo	Won
2015	International Emmy Award	Best Telenovela	Aguinaldo Silva	Won

Preceded by Em Família (2014)	Império; 21 July 2014 – 13 March 2015	Succeeded by Babilônia
