= Marcus Baby =

Plastic artist (born 1969)

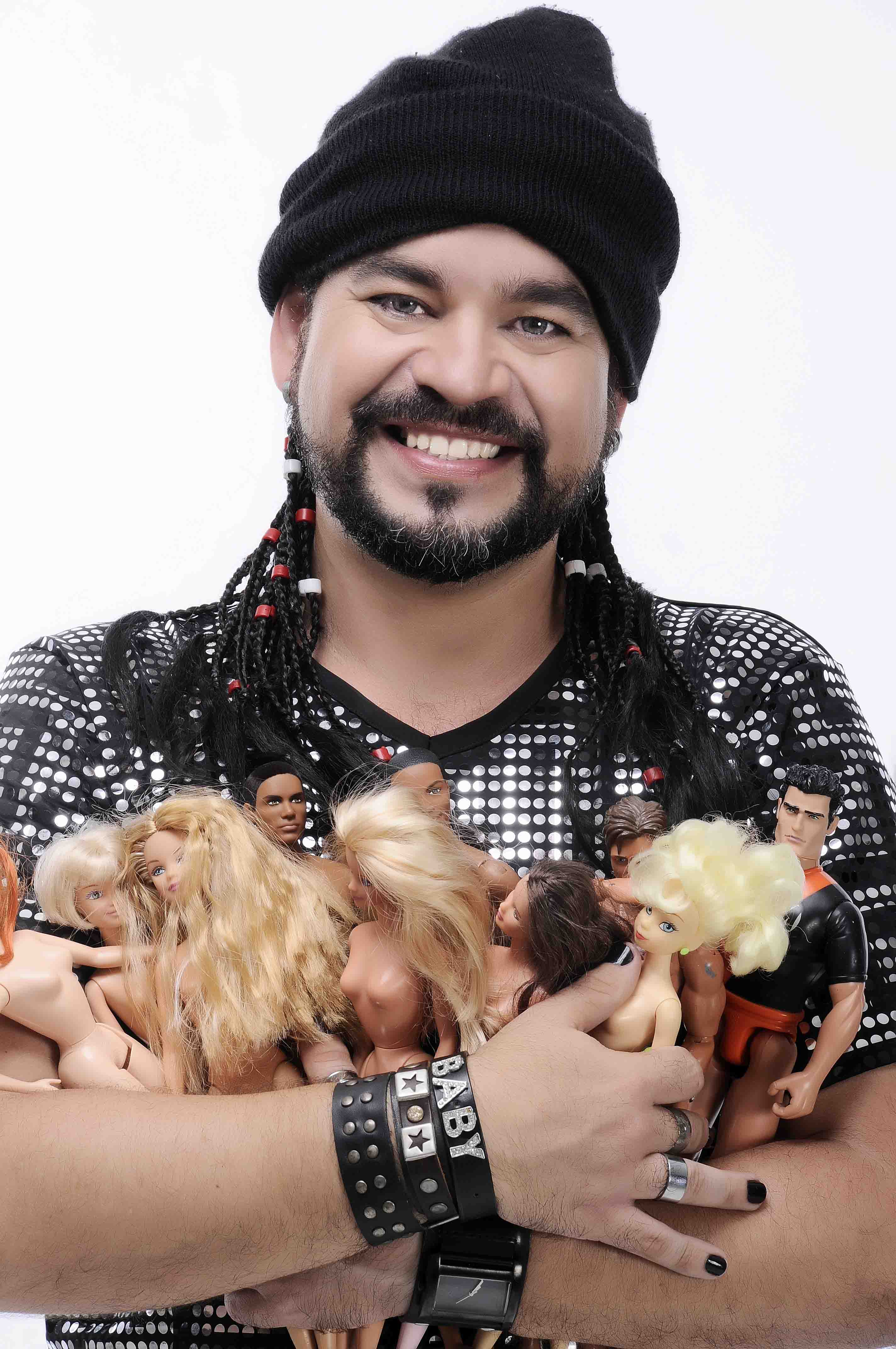
- Marcus Baby and his dolls
- Born: Marcus Vinicius da Silva Bernardo; November 23, 1969 (age 56); Natal, Rio Grande do Norte, Brazil
- Occupation: Plastic artist
- Website: www.marcusbaby.com

Marcus Vinícius da Silva Bernardo (born 1969), professionally known as Marcus Baby, is a Brazilian plastic artist. In the 1990s, he created his sculptures using child dolls and action figures, such as Barbie, as a base for his art.

In November 2005, he began creating dolls in the likeness of celebrities. His first work was a doll of Alinne Moraes' character in Viver a Vida, a Brazilian telenovela. He gained media attention when he refused to sell a doll he had created in the likeness of Hebe Camargo.

Barbie Dilma, his doll of Dilma Rousseff, then President of Brazil, was released right after her inauguration in January 2011, and became the best-known of his dolls.
