= Ary Fontoura =

Brazilian actor and writer (born 1933)

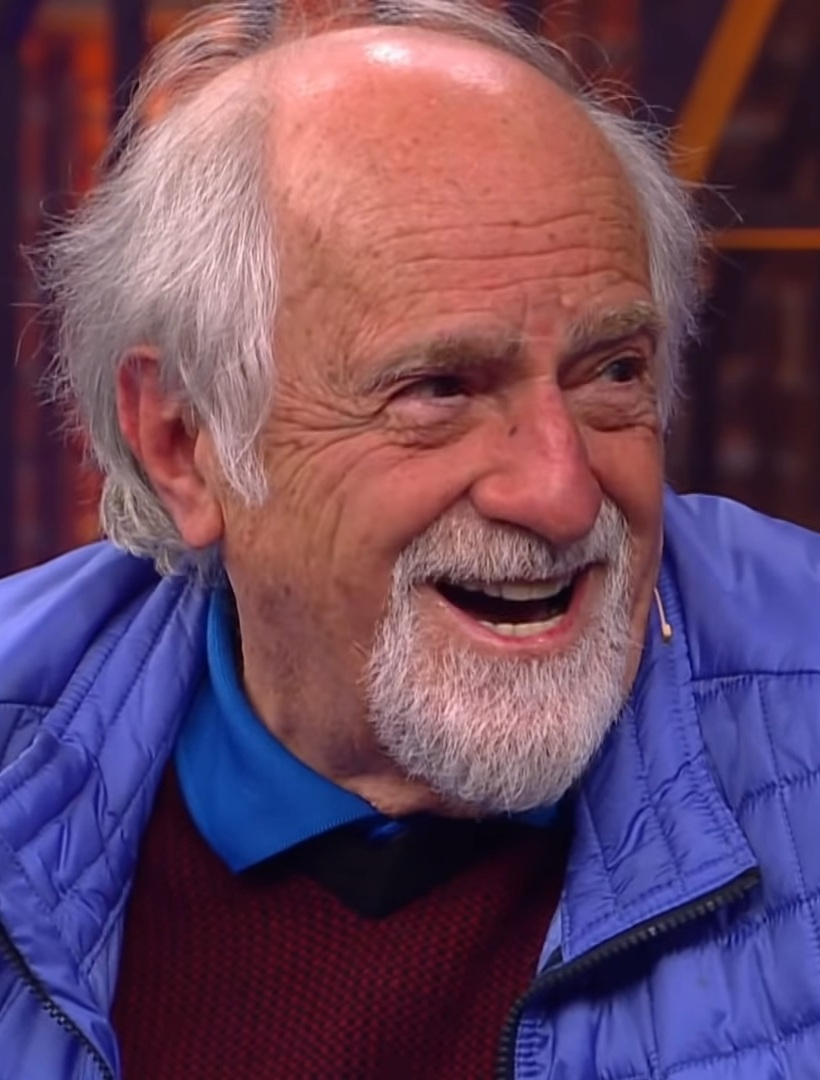
- Fontoura in 2021 during an interview with Lady Night.
- Born: Ary Beira Fontoura; 27 January 1933 (age 93); Curitiba, Paraná, Brazil
- Occupations: Actor; poet; writer; director; blogger; TV-presenter
- Years active: 1949–present
- Website: aryfontoura.com.br

Ary Beira Fontoura (born 27 January 1933) is a Brazilian actor, writer, director, poet, blogger and TV-presenter. He was born in Curitiba, Paraná.

== Personal life ==
In 2020, he came out as gay, after Maria Zilda Bethlem outed him.

== Filmography ==
=== Television ===
| Ano | Título | Papel | Nota |
|---|---|---|---|
| 1962 | O Vigilante Rodoviário | Bandit | Episode: "Aventura em Vila Velha" |
| 1965 | Rua da Matriz | | |
| 1968 | Passo dos Ventos | Vivien's teacher | Participation |
| 1969 | A Ponte dos Suspiros | Pedro Aretino | |
| 1969 | Rosa Rebelde | Count | |
| 1970 | Assim na Terra como no Céu | Rodolfo Augusto | |
| 1971 | O Cafona | Prophet | |
| 1971–1973 | Faça Humor, Não Faça Guerra | Various characters | |
| 1972 | Bandeira 2 | Apolinário Gusmão | |
| 1972 | Uma Rosa com Amor | Afrânio | |
| 1973 | O Semideus | Mauro | |
| 1974 | O Espigão | Baltazar Camará | |
| 1975 | Gabriela | Doctor Pelópidas Clóvis Costa | |
| 1976 | Anjo Mau | Nice flirt | Participation |
| 1976 | Saramandaia | Teacher Aristóbulo Camargo | |
| 1977 | À Sombra dos Laranjais | Tomé Caldas "Estopim" | |
| 1977 | Nina | Fialho | |
| 1978 | Dancin' Days | Ubirajara Martins Franco | |
| 1979 | Memórias de Amor | Mânlio | |
| 1979 | Marron Glacê | Ernani | |
| 1979 | Plantão de Polícia | | |
| 1979 | Carga Pesada | Coriolano | Episode: "A Suspeita" |
| 1980 | Plumas e Paetês | Raul Resende | |
| 1980 | Sítio do Picapau Amarelo | Magician Mandarino | Episode: "Não Era uma Vez..." |
| 1980 | O Bem Amado | Judge | Episode: "O Julgamento de Dirceu Borboleta" |
| 1981 | Jogo da Vida | Célio Barros "Celinho" | |
| 1982 | Paraíso | Priest Bento | |
| 1983 | Guerra dos Sexos | Dinorá Carneiro "Dino" | |
| 1984 | Amor com Amor Se Paga | Nonô Correia | |
| 1985 | Roque Santeiro | Mayor Florindo Abelha "Seu Flô" | |
| 1986 | Hipertensão | Romeu | |
| 1986 | Quarta Nobre | De Paula | Episode: "Negro Léo" |
| 1987 | Expresso Brasil | Various characters | |
| 1988 | Bebê a Bordo | Nero Petraglia | |
| 1989 | Tieta | Colonel Arthur da Tapitanga | |
| 1990 | Araponga | General Perácio | |
| 1992 | Deus Nos Acuda | Félix Goulart | |
| 1992 | Você Decide | | |
| 1993 | Agosto | Ipojuca | |
| 1994 | A Viagem | Tibério Campos | |
| 1995 | Engraçadinha: Seus Amores e Seus Pecados | Bar owner | |
| 1995 | Caso Especial | Aderaldo | Episode: "A Farsa da Boa Preguiça" |
| 1996 | Vira Lata | Aurélio Botelho Wanderpetrokovtz | |
| 1997 | A Indomada | Deputy Pitágoras William Mackenzie | |
| 1998 | Meu Bem Querer | Delegate Néris Ferreira de Souza | |
| 1998 | Didi e o Avarento | Doctor Fernando | End of year special |
| 1998 | Didi Malasartes | Rei | End of year special |
| 1999 | Vila Madalena | Elpídio Menezes (Menêz) | |
| 1999 | Sai de Baixo | Geraldo Berrante | Episode: "O Auto da Enlouquecida" |
| 2000 | Sai de Baixo | Pereira | Season 5 |
| 2001 | Porto dos Milagres | Deputy Pitágoras William Mackenzie | |
| 2001–2005 | Sítio do Picapau Amarelo | Colonel Teodorico de Menezes | Seasons 1–5 |
| 2003 | Chocolate com Pimenta | Ludovico Canto e Melo | |
| 2004 | A Diarista | Heródoto | Episode: "Mata o Véio" |
| 2007 | Sete Pecados | Romeu Albuquerque | |
| 2008 | A Favorita | Francisco Silveira "Silveirinha" | |
| 2009 | Caras & Bocas | Jacques Michel Conti | |
| 2010 | A Cura | Doctor Turíbio Guedes | |
| 2011 | Morde & Assopra | Isaías Junqueira Alves "Zazá" | |
| 2012 | As Brasileiras | Jardel Castorino | Episode: "A Inocente de Brasília" |
| 2012 | Gabriela | Colonel Coriolano Ribeiro | |
| 2013 | Amor à Vida | Doctor Lutero Moura Cardoso | |
| 2016 | Êta Mundo Bom! | Joaquim Pereira "Quinzinho" | |
| 2017 | Dois Irmãos | Abelardo Reinoso | |
| 2018 | Orgulho e Paixão | Afrânio Cavalcante, Baron of Ouro Verde | |
| 2019 | A Dona do Pedaço | Doctor Antero Valadares | |
| 2020–2021 | Salve-se Quem Puder | Himself | Episode: "February 22" Episode: "March 3" Episode: "June 24th" |
| 2021 | Sob Pressão | Arnaldo | Episode: "September 1st" |
| 2023 | Família Paraíso | Doctor Pet | Episode: "O Doutor" |
| 2023 | Fuzuê | Lampião / Lumière | |
| 2023 | Fim | Seu Vitor | |
| 2025–2026 | Êta Mundo Melhor! | Joaquim Pereira Torres "Quinzinho" | |

=== Cinema ===
| Year | Title | Role | Notes |
|---|---|---|---|
| 2026 | Velhos Bandidos | Rodolfo | |
| 2024 | Tributo: Ary Fontoura | Himself | Globoplay documentary |
| 2024 | Migration | Uncle Dan (voice) | Brazilian Dubbing |
| 2022 | Paws of Fury: The Legend of Hank | Xogum (voice) | Brazilian Dubbing |
| 2022 | Turning Red | Mr. Gao (voice) | Brazilian Dubbing |
| 2017 | Polícia Federal: A Lei É para Todos | Luiz Inácio Lula da Silva | |
| 2015 | My Hindu Friend | Dudu | |
| 2010 | A Suprema Felicidade | Priest | |
| 2009 | O Sol do Meio Dia | | |
| 2009 | If I Were You 2 | Priest Henrique | |
| 2008 | Guerra dos Rocha | Dona Ondina Rocha "Dina" | |
| 2006 | If I Were You | Priest Henrique | |
| 2006 | Xuxa Gêmeas | Doctor Júlio César Dourado | |
| 2005 | Terra Incógnita | | |
| 1997 | Ed Mort | Nogueira | |
| 1981 | O Torturador | | |
| 1981 | O Beijo | | |
| 1980 | Os Sete Gatinhos | Doctor Portela | |
| 1976 | Mar de Rosas | | |
| 1975 | Motel | Camilo | |
| 1974 | Banana Mecânica | | |
| 1973 | Os Mansos | | segment: "O Homem dos Quatro Chifres" |
| 1971 | Um Uísque Antes, Um Cigarro Depois | Otávio | segment: "Um Uísque Antes" |
| 1971 | A Serpente | | |
| 1969 | Os Paqueras | Suzy's husband | |
| 1969 | Massacre no Supermercado | | |
| 1968 | Até que o Casamento nos Separe | Vicente | |
| 1968 | Os Raptores | | |
| 1967 | As Sete Faces de Um Cafajeste | Afonso | |
| 1961 | O Vigilante Rodoviário | | |

== Stage ==
- 1964 - Mister Sexo - de João Bittencourt, wit h direction of João Bittencourt
- 1964 - Caiu, Primeiro de Abriu - of Raul da Matta, with direction of Sadi Cabral
- 1964 - Como Vencer na Vida Sem Fazer Força - of Frank Loesser and Abe Burrows, with direction of Harry Woolever and Sergio de Oliveira
- 1966 - Música, Divina Comédia - inspired in A Noviça Rebelde, of Robert Wise, with direction of Harry Woolever and Sergio de Oliveira
- 1966 - Onde Canta o Sabiá? - of Gastão Tojeiro, with direction of Paulo Afonso Grisolli
- 1967 - Rastros Atrás - of Jorge Andrade, with direction of Gianni Ratto
- 1967 - A Úlcera de Ouro - of Hélio Bloch, with direction of Leo Jusi
- 1968 - Secretíssimo - of Marc Camoletti, with direction of Fábio Sabag
- 1968 - Dr. Getúlio, Sua Vida, Sua Glória - of Ferreira Gullar and Dias Gomes, with direction of José Renato
- 1968 - Jornada de Um Imbecil Até o Entendimento - of Plínio Marcos, com direção de João das Neves
- 1968 - O Inspector Geral - of Nicolai Gogol, with direction of Benedito Corsi
- 1969 - Crime Perfeito - of Frederick Knott, with direction of Antonio de Cabo
- 1969 - Catarina da Rússia - of Alfonso Paso, with direction of Antonio de Cabo
- 1969 - Meu Bem, Como Posso Escutar Você com a Torneira Aberta? - of Robert Anderson, with direction of Antonio de Cabo
- 1970 - Tem Banana na Banda - of Oduvaldo Vianna, Millor Fernandes, José Wilker and others, with direction of Kleber Santos
- 1971 - Alice no País Divino, Maravilhoso! - of Paulo Afonso Grisolli, Tite de Lemos and Sidney Miller, with direction of Paulo Afonso Grisolli
- 1972 - Os Caras de Pau - of Ary Fontoura, with direction of Ary Fontoura
- 1972 - O Peru - of Georges Feydeau, with direction of José Renato
- 1973 - Querido, Agora Não - of Ray Cooney, with direction of Sergio Viotti
- 1974 - O Camarada Miossov - of Valentim Kataiev, with direction of Fabio Sabag
- 1974 - O Estranho - of Edgar da Rocha Miranda, with direction of João Bittencourt
- 1974 - A Mulher de Todos Nós - of Henri Becker, translation of Millor Fernandes, with direction of Fernando Torres
- 1974 - O Ministro e a Vedete - with direction of Geraldo Queiroz
- 1975 - Mamãe, Papai tá Ficando Roxo - of Oduvaldo Vianna, with direction of Walter Avancini
- 1976 - Alta Rotatividade - with Leila Cravo, Rogéria and Agildo Ribeiro
- 1976 - Divórcio, Cupim da Sociedade - of Max Nunes and Hilton Marques, with direction of Gracindo Junior
- 1976 - Arlequim, Servidor de Dois Amos - of Goldoni, with direction of José Renato
- 1978 - Ópera do Malandro - of Chico Buarque, with direction of Luís Antônio Martinez Corrêa
- 1979 - Rasga Coração - of Oduvaldo Vianna Filho, with direction of José Renato
- 1980 - Mãos ao Alto, Rio! - of Paulo Goulart, with direction of Aderbal Freire Junior
- 1983 - Rei Lear - of William Shakespeare, translation of Millor Fernandes, with direction of Celso Nunes
- 1984 - Assim É, Se lhe Parece - of Luigi Pirandello, with direction of Paulo Betti
- 1986 - Sábado, Domingo, Segunda - of Edoardo de Fellipo, with direction of José Wilker
- 1988 - Drácula – of Bram Stoker - with direction of Ary Fontoura
- 1989 - Moça, Nunca Mais - of Ary Fontoura and Júlio Bressane, with direction of Ary Fontoura
- 1990 - Corações Desesperados - of Flávio de Souza, with direction of Jorge Fernando
- 1995 - Corra, Que Papai Vem Aí - of Sam Bobrick and Ron Clark, with direction of Ary Fontoura
- 2001 - A Diabólica Moll Flanders - of Daniel Defoe, with adaptation and direction of Charles Möeller and Cláudio Botelho
- 2005 - Marido de Mulher Feia Tem Raiva de Feriado - of Paulo Afonso de Lima and Ary Fontoura, with direction of Ary Fontoura
- 2014 - O Comediante - of Joseph Meyer, with direction of José Wilker and Anderson Cunha
- 2017 - Num Lago Dourado - of Mark Rydell, with direction of Elias Andreato

== Show ==
- Machado’s Holiday - Boite Fred's, Rio, direction of Carlos Machado
- It’s a Mad, Mad, Mad Hollywood - Boite Fred’s, Rio, direction of Carlos Machado
- As Pussy, Pussy, Cats - written with Sérgio Porto, Boite Fred’s, Rio, direction of Carlos Machado
- Festival do Stanislau - written by Sérgio Porto, Boite Fred’s, Rio, direction of Carlos Machado
- Graça do Bonfim - Golden Room of Copacabana Palace, direction of Carlos Machado
- Deu Bode na TV - Boite Macumba, Rio, direction of Carlos Machado
- Motel Business - written and directed by Carlos Machado, Boite Macumba, Rio
- Os Caras de Pau - written by Ary Fontoura, directed by Fernando Pinto, tour throughout Brazil
- A Coisa está Preta - written by Ary Fontourato present in Montreal, Canada
