= Fuzuê =

- Genre: Telenovela
- Created by: Gustavo Reiz
- Written by: João Brandão; Juliana Peres; Michel Carvalho; Luciane Reis
- Directed by: Fabrício Mamberti
- Starring: Giovana Cordeiro; Nicolas Prattes; Marina Ruy Barbosa; Edson Celulari; Lilia Cabral; Felipe Simas; Heslaine Vieira; Michel Joelsas
- Theme music composer: Kauê Segundêro; Michel Teló; Newton Fonseca; Shylton Fernandes; Kalew Soares
- Opening theme: "Fuzuê" by Michel Teló
- Composer: Nani Palmeira
- Country of origin: Brazil
- Original language: Portuguese
- No. of seasons: 1
- No. of episodes: 173

Production
- Producer: Gustavo Rebelo
- Editors: Ghynn Paul; Isabella Seabra
- Production company: Estúdios Globo

Original release
- Network: TV Globo
- Release: 14 August 2023 – 1 March 2024

Fuzuê is a Brazilian telenovela created by Gustavo Reiz. It aired on TV Globo from 14 August 2023 to 1 March 2024. The telenovela stars Giovana Cordeiro, Nicolas Prattes, Marina Ruy Barbosa, Edson Celulari, Lilia Cabral, Felipe Simas, Heslaine Vieira and Michel Joelsas.

== Cast ==
An extensive cast list was published on 21 July 2023.

- Marina Ruy Barbosa as Preciosa Montebello
  - Alice Camargo as child Preciosa
- Giovana Cordeiro as Luna Coelho
- Nicolas Prattes as Miguel de Braga e Silva
- Felipe Simas as Heitor Pinto Montebello
- Juliano Cazarré as Pascoal Garcia
- Fernanda Rodrigues as Alicia de Braga e Silva
- Douglas Silva as Cláudio Ferreira
- Heslaine Vieira as Soraya Terremoto
- Micael Borges as Jeferson Carneiro
- Michel Joelsas as Francisco de Braga e Silva
- Ruan Aguiar as Merreca
- Rogério Brito as Delegado Barreto
- Cinnara Leal as Cecília Freitas
- Zezeh Barbosa as Gláucia Corneteira
- Valquíria Ribeiro as Rejane Miranda
- Jessica Córes as Olívia de Castro
- Pedro Carvalho as Rui Sodré
- Bia Montez as Conceição Leal
- Cyria Coentro as Emília Pereira
- Déo Garcez as Domingos Carneiro
- Val Perré as Otávio Augusto Peçanha
- Noemia Oliveira as Kirida
- Guil Anacleto as Bartô
- Milton Filho as Edgar
- Danilo Maia as Vitor Pereira
- Bruno de Mello as Fiel
- Eber Inácio as Gilmar
- Guilhermina Libanio as Bianca Viana
- Ingrid Klug as Vânia Ribeiro
- Clayton Nascimento as Caíto Figueroa Roitman
- Maria Flor Samarão as Valentina Ferreira de Braga e Silva
- Theo Matos as Bernardo Montebello
- Ary Fontoura as Seu Lampião / Lumière
- Hilton Cobra as Cata Ouro
- Lilia Cabral as Isabel "Bebel" Montebello
- Edson Celulari as Nero de Braga e Silva

=== Guest stars ===
- Olívia Araújo as Maria Neiva Coelho "Maria Navalha"
- Nathalia Timberg as Jaci
- Zezé Motta as Rosa Maria dos Santos "Dama de Ouro"
- Leopoldo Pacheco as César Montebello
- Nany People as Guilhermina
- Miguel Nader as Jaime
- Milton Cunha as himself
- Michel Teló as himself

== Production ==
In July 2019, Gustavo Reiz signed a contract with TV Globo and was commissioned by the director of dramaturgy to develop a synopsis for the 7:00 p.m. timeslot. In November 2020, Fuzuê was announced as the telenovela's title. Pre-production began in March 2023, with a meeting between the cast and crew at Estúdios Globo. Filming began a month later in Rio de Janeiro. On 17 July 2023, the first teaser for the telenovela was released.

== Ratings ==
Season	Episodes	First aired		Last aired		Avg. viewers (points)
Season	Episodes	Date	Viewers (points)	Date	Viewers (points)	Avg. viewers (points)
1	173	14 August 2023	24.3	1 March 2024	20.9	19.3
