= Morde & Assopra =

Brazilian telenovela by Walcyr Carrasco

- Genre: Telenovela
- Created by: Walcyr Carrasco
- Written by: Claudia Souto
- Directed by: Pedro Vasconcelos
- Starring: Adriana Esteves; Marcos Pasquim; Flávia Alessandra; Mateus Solano; Elizabeth Savalla; Ary Fontoura
- Country of origin: Brazil
- Original language: Portuguese
- No. of seasons: 1
- No. of episodes: 179

Production
- Production company: Central Globo de Produção

Original release
- Network: Rede Globo
- Release: 21 March – 14 October 2011

Morde & Assopra (Dinosaurs & Robots) is a Brazilian telenovela that aired on TV Globo from 21 March 2011 to 14 October 2011.

It stars Adriana Esteves, Marcos Pasquim, Flávia Alessandra, Mateus Solano, Elizabeth Savalla, and Ary Fontoura.

== Synopsis ==
Paleontologist Júlia (Adriana Esteves) dreams of finding remains of a marine reptile, but an earthquake in Mount Fuji, Japan, ends her expectations. She sets off for the fictional town of Preciosa, where Abner (Marcos Pasquim), a farmer, believes a Titanosaurus fossil is buried in his coffee plantations. However, Abner is against the excavations and does not want to destroy his plantation. Júlia and Abner are opposites, but a passion is born between them. Meanwhile, Ícaro (Mateus Solano), fascinated by robotics, wants to create an android that resembles Naomi (Flávia Alessandra), the loved one he lost in an accident.

== Cast ==
- Adriana Esteves as Júlia Freire de Aquino
- Marcos Pasquim as Abner Martins de Medeiros
- Flávia Alessandra as Naomi Gusmão (human) / Naomi (humanoid robot)
- Mateus Solano as Ícaro Sampaio
- Ary Fontoura as Mayor Isaías "Zazá" Junqueira Alves
- Elizabeth Savalla as Minerva Alves
- Cássia Kis Magro as Dulce Maria
- Jandira Martini as Salomé de Souza
- Vanessa Giácomo as Celeste de Souza Sampaio
- André Gonçalves as Áureo Alves
- Paulo Vilhena as Cristiano
- Carol Castro as Natália Sampaio
- Caio Blat as Leandro
- Bárbara Paz as Virgínia Lolato
- Paulo Goulart as Eliseu
- Luís Melo as Oséas
- Nívea Stelmann as Lavínia Silva Guedes
- Tarcísio Filho as Pimentel
- Carla Marins as Amanda
- Marina Ruy Barbosa as Alice Alves
- Gabriela Carneiro da Cunha as Raquel Martins de Medeiros
- Sérgio Marone as Marcos Sampaio
- Otaviano Costa as Élcio/Elaine
- Max Fercondini as Wilson
- Ana Rosa as Dinorá
- Suzy Rêgo as Duda Aguiar
- Luana Tanaka as Keiko Tanaka
- Ildi Silva as Lídia Santos
- Michel Bercovitch as John Lewis
- Rodrigo Hilbert as Fernando
- André Bankoff as Tiago
- Raphael Viana as Tadeu Ferreira
- Joaquim Lopes as Josué
- Cristina Mutarelli as Pink
- Flávia Garrafa as Carolina
- Miriam Lins as Irene
- Bruna Spínola as Abelha (Maria Eduarda)
- Klebber Toledo as Guilherme Duarte de Lima
- Erom Cordeiro as Father Francisco
- Guilherme Nasraui as Daniel
- Thiago Luciano as Éverton
- Cosme dos Santos as Bento
- Ary França as Dorival
- Cláudio Jaborandy as Nivaldo
- Fernando Roncato as Renato
- Neusa Maria Faro as Palmira
- Sandra Barsotti as Dora
- Narjara Turetta as Lílian
- Dhu Moraes as Janice
- Vera Mancini as Cleonice
- Miwa Yanagizawa as Tieko Kobayashi
- Daniela Fontan as Marli
- Aline Peixoto as Márcia Gadelha
- Juliana Schalch as Lara
- Jurema Reis as Maria João
- Camila Chiba as Hoshi Tanaka
- Bárbara Silvestre as Inês
- Guilherme Gonzalez as Efraim
- Rael Barja as Tutu
- Anderson Di Rizzi as Sergeant Xavier
- Keff Oliveira as Caco
- Marisol Ribeiro as Melissa
- Carol Abras as Tânia
- Karla Karenina as Anecy Gadelha
- Veronica Rocha as Selma
- Chao Chen as Akira Kobayashi
- Mauro Gorini as Roney
- Dionísio Neto as Aquiles
- Oswaldo Lot as Zé Paulo
- Celso Bernini as Bira
- Ken Kaneko as Hinoue
- Márcio Tadeu de Lima as Herculano Gadelha
- Antônio Firmino as Ígor
- Leandro Ribeiro as Heitor
- Marcos Miura as Shiro
- Ricardo Vandré as Moisés
