= Prêmio Extra de Televisão de melhor ator =

- Awarded for: Best Performance by an Actor in Television
- Country: Brazil
- Presented by: Jornal Extra
- First award: 1998
- Currently held by: Domingos Montagner; Velho Chico (2016)

The Prêmio Extra de Televisão de melhor ator (English: Extra Television Awards for Best Actor) is a category of the Prêmio Extra de Televisão, destined to the best actor of the Brazilian television.

== Winner ==
=== 1998–2007 ===
- 1998 – Tony Ramos in Torre de Babel
- 1999 – Marco Nanini in Andando nas Nuvens
- 2000 – Eduardo Moscovis in O Cravo e a Rosa
- 2001 – Antônio Fagundes in Porto dos Milagres
- 2002 – Vladimir Brichta in Coração de Estudante
- 2003 – Tony Ramos in Mulheres Apaixonadas
- 2004 – Tony Ramos in Cabocla
- 2005 – Murilo Rosa in América
- 2006 – Lázaro Ramos in Cobras & Lagartos
- 2007 – Wagner Moura in Paraíso Tropical

=== 2008–present ===
- 2008 – Antônio Fagundes in Duas Caras
  - Edson Celulari in Beleza Pura
  - Daniel Dantas in Ciranda de Pedra
  - Murilo Benício in A Favorita
  - Leonardo Brício in Chamas da Vida
- 2009 – Rodrigo Lombardi in Caminho das Índias
  - Ângelo Paes Leme in A Lei e o Crime
  - Eriberto Leão in Paraíso
  - Felipe Camargo in Som & Fúria
  - Marcelo Serrado in Poder Paralelo
  - Tony Ramos in Caminho das Índias
- 2010 – Murilo Benício in Ti Ti Ti
  - Ângelo Paes Leme in Ribeirão do Tempo
  - Mateus Solano in Viver a Vida
  - Alexandre Borges in Ti Ti Ti
  - Tony Ramos in Passione
  - Alexandre Nero in Escrito nas Estrelas
- 2011 – Gabriel Braga Nunes in Insensato Coração
  - Bruno Gagliasso in Cordel Encantado
  - Cauã Reymond in Cordel Encantado
  - Jorge Fernando in Macho Man
  - Rodrigo Lombardi in O Astro
  - Selton Mello in A Mulher Invisível
- 2012 – Marcelo Serrado in Fina Estampa
  - Antonio Fagundes in Gabriela
  - Cauã Reymond in Avenida Brasil
  - Marcelo Novaes in Avenida Brasil
  - Murilo Benício in Avenida Brasil
  - Ricardo Tozzi in Cheias de Charme
- 2013 – Mateus Solano in Amor à Vida
  - Antonio Fagundes in Amor à Vida
  - Lázaro Ramos in Lado a Lado
  - Malvino Salvador in Amor à Vida
  - Marco Pigossi in Sangue Bom
  - Thiago Fragoso in Lado a Lado
- 2014 – Alexandre Nero in Império
  - Cauã Reymond in Amores Roubados
  - Chay Suede in Império
  - Humberto Martins in Em Família
  - Irandhir Santos in Meu Pedacinho de Chão
  - Osmar Prado in Meu Pedacinho de Chão
- 2015 – Rodrigo Lombardi in Verdades Secretas
  - Alexandre Nero in A Regra do Jogo
  - Caio Castro in I Love Paraisópolis
  - Cauã Reymond in A Regra do Jogo
  - Enrique Diaz in Felizes para Sempre?
  - Tony Ramos in A Regra do Jogo
- 2016 – Domingos Montagner in Velho Chico
  - Felipe Simas in Totalmente Demais
  - Jesuíta Barbosa in Justiça
  - João Baldasserini in Haja Coração
  - Rodrigo Santoro in Velho Chico
  - Sérgio Guizé in Êta Mundo Bom!
