= Calafiori =

Calafiori is a surname. Notable people with the surname include:

- Riccardo Calafiori (born 2002), Italian football defender
- Tammy Di Calafiori, Brazilian actress and television host
