= Confissões de Adolescente =

2013 film directed by Daniel Filho

- Theatrical release poster
- Directed by: Daniel Filho; Cris d'Amato
- Written by: Matheus Souza
- Based on: Confissões de Adolescente by Maria Mariana
- Starring: Sophia Abrahão; Bella Camero; Malu Rodrigues; Clara Tiezzi; Deborah Secco; Maria Mariana
- Cinematography: Felipe Reinheimer
- Edited by: Diana Vasconcellos
- Production companies: Globo Filmes; Lereby Productions
- Distributed by: Walt Disney Studios Sony Pictures Releasing do Brasil Ltda. (Note: Distributed under the Columbia Pictures banner.)
- Release dates: December 2013 (Rio de Janeiro premiere); January 10, 2014
- Country: Brazil
- Language: Portuguese
- Budget: R$ 9 million

Confissões de Adolescente is a 2013 Brazilian comedy-drama film directed by Daniel Filho and Cris d'Amato, based on the diaries of Maria Mariana, which were also adapted into theatrical works, a book, and TV series. The film follows the rites of passage experienced by four sisters.

Actresses Maria Mariana, Deborah Secco, Daniele Valente and Georgiana Góes, the protagonists of the homonymous television series, make appearances in the film.

== Plot ==
After their father's warning that they will have to move out of the apartment where they live, in Barra da Tijuca, because of the excessive increase of rent, the girls promise to save more money and help in household chores to try to reverse the decision. While dealing with this, each one lives a typical rite of passage of the coming of age: the first kiss, the first sexual intercourse, first job, first breakup.

Living alone, but still with little money to support herself, Tina is in search of her first internship, while dealing with constant disappointments with her boyfriend, Lucas. Bianca is in a new relationship, and will soon be taking the vestibular exam, but have not chosen a profession yet, While trying to help a new classmate who suffer bullying, and she still has to deal with the jealousy of her best friend. Alice wants to have the first sexual intercourse with her boyfriend, also a virgin, but realizes the decision is not as simple as she expected. Youngest of four, Clara is addicted on Facebook and starts to target the interests of a friend from school, which resolves to behave as the vampire Edward Cullen, from the Twilight Saga to conquer her.

== Cast ==
- Sophia Abrahão - Tina
- Bella Camero - Bianca
- Malu Rodrigues - Alice
- Clara Tiezzi - Karina
- Deborah Secco - Mother of Felipe
- Maria Mariana - Dr. Kátia
- Daniele Valente - Mother of Marcelo
- Georgiana Góes - Selma, Coach of Physical Education
- Cassio Gabus Mendes - Paulo
- Olívia Torres - Juliana
- Tammy Di Calafiori - Talita
- Hugo Bonemer - Lucas
- Christian Monassa - Marcelo
- Guilherme Prates - Ricardo
- João Fernandes - Felipe
- Bruno Jablonski - Pedro
- Anna Rita Cerqueira - Cris (young Tina)
- Eduardo Melo - Lucas younger
- Thiago Lacerda
- Caio Castro
- Gabriel Totoro
- Cintia Rosa - Renata
- Bruna Griphao - Bruna

== Awards and nominations ==
Year	Award	Category	Nominated	Result
2014	Atrevida Magazine	Film of the Year	Confissões de Adolescente	Nominated
