= Júlio Rocha =

Brazilian actor (born 1979)

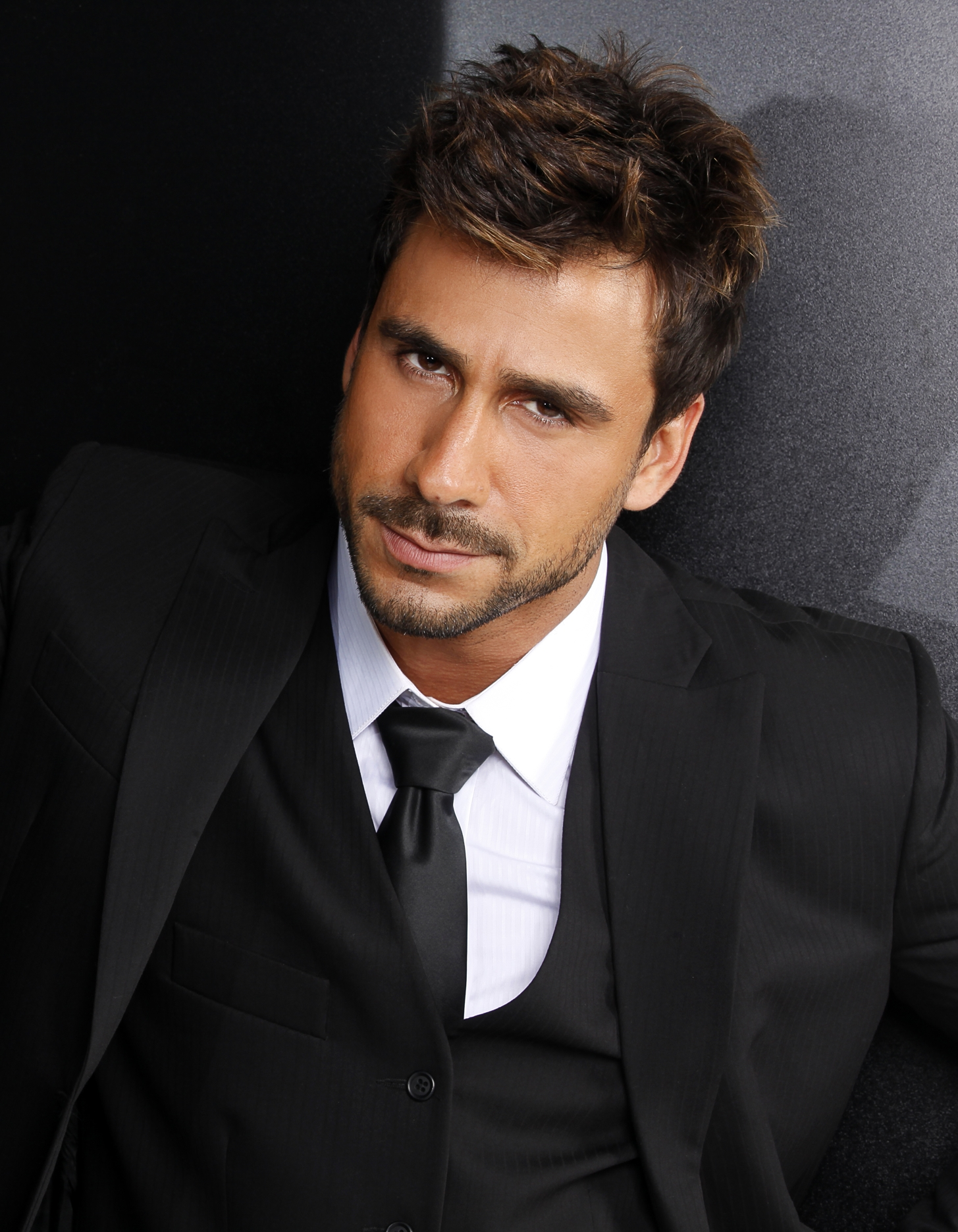
- Born: Júlio César Rocha; October 22, 1979 (age 46); São Paulo, Brazil
- Occupation: Actor
- Website: www.juliorocha.com

Júlio César Rocha (born October 22, 1979, in São Paulo) is a Brazilian actor.

== Biography ==
He studied at the Theatre School Célia Helena, attended the Anhembi Morumbi University, studied at the Actors School Wolf Maya in São Paulo and New York Film Academy in New York City.

The actor began his career at age 15 when he participated in "ballet in the curve". From there, he appeared in "Our family life", "The case of the ten darkies", "Rise and Fall of the City of Mahagonny", "Patty Diphusa Pedro Almodovar," "Beware, boy love," Toni Brandão, that won the APCA award for best juvenile play in 1997.

On television he had a prominent role as the character "João Batista" in the novel Duas Caras and currently as the mysterious "Enzo" of Fina Estampa.

In 2013, Rocha return to the novels Amor à Vida, the plot it interprets Jacques.

== Filmography ==
=== Television ===
Year	Title	Role	Notes
1999	Louca Paixão	Rodrigo	Cameo
2001	Porto dos Milagres	Luciano	Cameo
2004	A Diarista	Betão	Episode: "O Hospital"
2006	Bang Bang	Baby Face	Cameo
2006	Belíssima	Paulão	Cameo
2007	Paraíso Tropical	Wagner Alencar	Cameo
2007	Pé na Jaca	Léo (Leonardo)	Cameo
2007	A Pedra do Reino	Dr. Pedro Gouveia	
2007	Duas Caras	JB (João Batista da Conceição)	
2008	Episódio Especial	Himself	Cameo
2008	Casos e Acasos	Uesley	Episode: "A Noiva, o Desempregado e o Fiscal"
2008	Guerra & Paz		Episode: "Lavanda & Vermelho"
2008	Faça Sua História	Jackson Maia	9 episodes
2009	Geral.com	New band manager	Cameo
2009	Caras & Bocas	Edgar Pereira	
2010	Companhia das Manhãs	Himself	Cameo
2010	Episódio Especial	Himself	Cameo
2011	Fina Estampa	Enzo Pereira	
2012	Dança dos Famosos 9	Himself	Reality show of Domingão do Faustão
2013	Pé na Cova	Marcinho Azeitona	Episode: "Toma Que O Defunto É Teu"
2013	Amor à Vida	Jacques Sampaio	
2025	Três Graças	Edilberto dos Reis	

=== Film ===
- 2009 – Não Me Deixe em Casa – Short film
- 2011 – Eu odeio o Orkut – Giácomo
