= Mateus Solano =

Brazilian actor (born 1981)

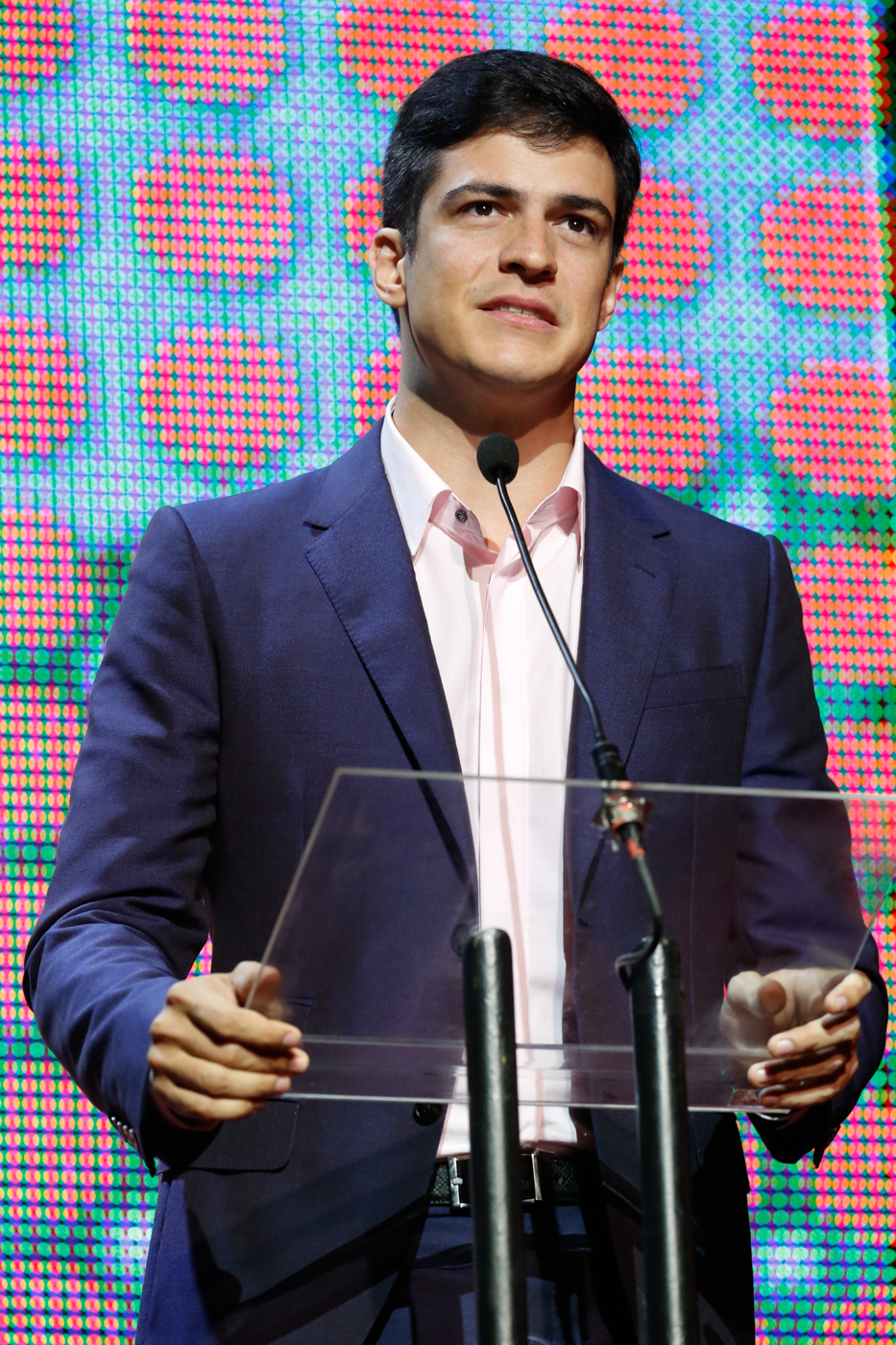
- Solano in 2014
- Born: Mateus Solano Schenker Carneiro da Cunha; 20 March 1981 (age 45); Brasília, Federal District, Brazil
- Education: Federal University of the State of Rio de Janeiro
- Occupation: Actor
- Years active: 2003–present
- Spouse: Paula Braun (m. 2008)
- Children: 2
- Relatives: Juliana Carneiro da Cunha (cousin)

Mateus Solano Schenker Carneiro da Cunha (born 20 March 1981) is a Brazilian actor.

He is best known for his performances in Brazilian telenovelas, television series and films. After his debut in Brazilian entertainment industry, Solano has featured in more than a dozen of telenovelas. In telenovelas, he is known for his roles in Viver a Vida, Gabriela, Amor à Vida, among others. He has received several accolades as well as nominations such as Melhores do Ano, Nickelodeon Kids' Choice Awards (Brazilian version), Troféu Imprensa, among others. In 2013, he played the role of Félix Khoury in the critically acclaimed telenovela Amor à Vida.

== Biography ==
Mateus was born in Brasília, capital of Brazil. By early adolescence, he was already working in small services. Seeking his personal independence and investing in his acting career, he moved to Washington, D.C. alone and then to Lisbon, Portugal. After some time, he returned to live with his mother in Rio de Janeiro. He holds a degree in performing arts from the Federal University of the State of Rio de Janeiro.

He is the cousin of the Brazilian actresses Juliana Carneiro da Cunha and Gabriela Carneiro da Cunha.

== Career ==
Solano's career began in 2003 at the age of 22 where he appeared in one of the episodes of Linha Direta. In 2004, he co-starred in Um Só Coração, a television miniseries where he played Gustavo Gomes. In 2005, he appeared in Glória Perez's series A Diarista. In 2007, Solano made a special appearance in Paraíso Tropical. In 2009, he played twins; Miguel and Jorge in Viver a Vida. The telenovela starred Taís Araújo, José Mayer, Alinne Moraes, Bárbara Paz, Lília Cabral. In 2012, he played as one of the leading roles in Gabriela, portraying Mundinho Falcão. In 2013, he, played the leading man for a conniving, evil and resentful Félix Khoury in Amor à Vida. The telenovela earned him several accolades due to his great performance in it. In 2016, he played José Maria Rubião in Liberdade, Liberdade.

== Personal life ==
In 2008, he married actress Paula Braun. On 18 October 2010, the couple's first daughter, Flora, was born. On 1 May 2015, the couple's second child, Benjamin, was born.

== Filmography ==
=== Film ===
Year	Title	Role	Notes
2004	O Primeiro Grito		Short film
2008	Linha de Passe	Marcelo	
2008	Maridos, Amantes e Pisantes	Amante	Short film
2008	Alice	Sergio	Short film
2009	Vida de Balconista	Mateus	
2011	A Novela das 8	João Paulo	
2014	Confia em Mim	Caio	
2014	O Menino no Espelho	Domingos	
2016	Em Nome da Lei	Vitor	
2017	Os 8 Magníficos	Himself	
2018	Maybe a Love Story	Virgílio	
2018	Loveling	Paçoca	
2019	B.O.	Himself	
2019	Tito and the Birds	Alaor Souza	Brazilian Dubbing
2019	Cadeia Alimentar	Jorge	Short film
2020	The SpongeBob Movie: Sponge on the Run	King Poseidon	Brazilian Dubbing

=== Television ===
Year	Title	Role / Function	Notes	Ref.
2003	Linha Direta	Stuart Angel Jones	Episode: "O Caso Zuzu Angel"	
2005	A Diarista	Paulão	Episode: "Nete, a Feia"	
2006	Sob Nova Direção	Pedro Paulo Capeletti	Episode: "Sexo, Mentiras e Internet"	
2006	JK	Júlio Soares		
2006	A Diarista	Bruno Borges	Episode: "Aquele da Copa"	
2006	Malhação	Carlos	Episode: "August 18"	
2007	Paraíso Tropical	André Jaime	Episodes: "March 29–April 2"	
2007	Pé na Jaca	Ari	Episode: "May 26–28"	
2007	Sítio do Picapau Amarelo	Pop Man	Episode: "O Anjinho da Asa Quebrada"	
2007	Sob Nova Direção	Elzimar	Episode: "Uma Babá Nada Perfeita"	
2008–10	Mateus, o Balconista	Mateus Aguiar		
2008	Faça Sua História	Toby Crane Cléber Augusto	Episode: "A Estrela do Irajá" Episode: "A Vingadora Capixaba"	
2008	Casos e Acasos	Gilson	Episode: "O Trote, o Filho e o For"	
2009	Maysa: Quando Fala o Coração	Ronaldo Bôscoli		
2009	Viver a Vida	Miguel Guimarães Machado		
2009	Viver a Vida	Jorge Guimarães Machado		
2011	Morde & Assopra	Ícaro Sampaio		
2011	A Mulher Invisível	Frederico "Fred" Martins	Episode: "December 6th"	
2012	As Brasileiras	Heitor	Episode: "A Vidente de Diamantina"	
2012	Gabriela	Raimundo Falcão "Mundinho"		
2013	Amor à Vida	Félix Rodriguez Khoury		
2015–21	Escolinha do Professor Raimundo	Zé Bonitinho		
2015–21	Escolinha do Professor Raimundo	Félix Rodriguez Khoury	Season 6	
2016; 18–19	Tá no Ar: a TV na TV	Himself	Episode: "March 1" Episode: "January 23" Episode: "February 12th"	
2016	Liberdade, Liberdade	José Maria Loredano Rubião "Rubião"		
2017	Pega Pega	Eric Ribeiro		
2019	A Dona do Pedaço	Josiel Dourado	Episode: "November 22"	
2020	Os Casais que Amamos	Himself	Episode: "Félix & Nico"	
2021	Detetives do Prédio Azul	Bruxo Alejandro Urze		
2021	Quanto Mais Vida, Melhor!	Guilherme Monteiro Bragança		
2023	The Masked Singer Brasil	Juror	Season 3	
2023	Elas por Elas	Jonas Santos		

== Awards and nominations ==
Year	Award	Category	Title of Work	Result	Source(s)
2010	Festival de Cinema de Maringá	Vida de Balconista	Best Actor	Won	
2010	Melhores do Ano	Best Male Revelation	Viver a Vida	Won	
2010	Meus Prêmios Nick	Favorite Actor	Viver a Vida	Won	
2010	Troféu Imprensa	Revelation of Year	Viver a Vida	Won	
2010	Prêmio Contigo! de TV	Best Actor	Viver a Vida	Won	
2010	Prêmio Contigo! de TV	Best Male Revelation	Maysa: Quando Fala o Coração	Nominated	
2013	Meus Prêmios Nick	Favorite Actor	Amor à Vida	Won	
2013	Prêmio Extra de Televisão	Best Actor	Amor à Vida	Won	
2013	Troféu APCA	Best Actor	Amor à Vida	Won	
2013	Prêmio Quem de Televisão	Best Actor	Amor à Vida	Won	
2013	Melhores do Ano	Best Actor	Amor à Vida	Won	
2014	Troféu Imprensa	Best Actor	Amor à Vida	Won	
2014	Troféu Internet	Best Actor	Amor à Vida	Won	
2014	Prêmio Contigo! de TV	Best Actor	Amor à Vida	Won	
