= Thiago Lacerda =

Brazilian film and television actor

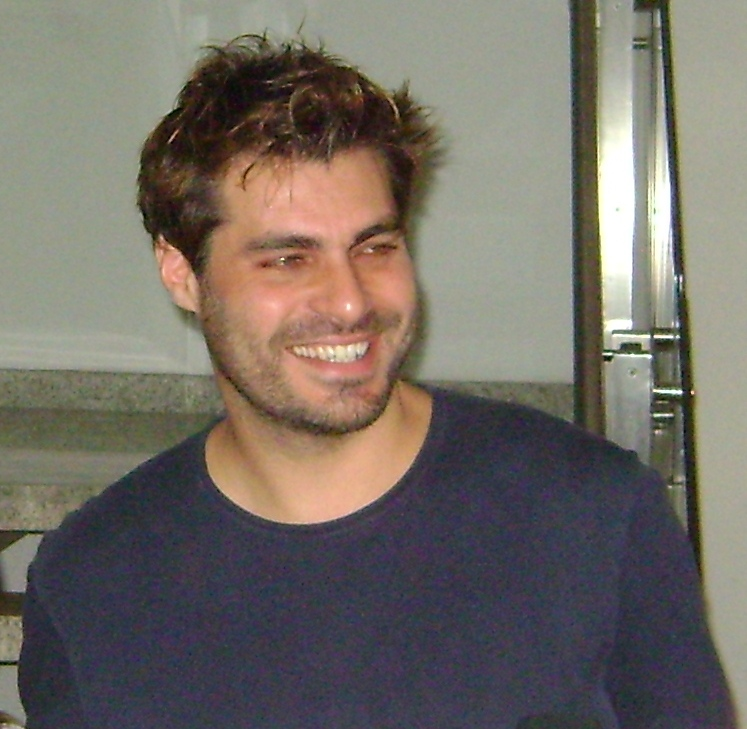
- Lacerda in 2010
- Born: Thiago Ribeiro Lacerda; 19 January 1978 (age 48); Rio de Janeiro, Brazil
- Occupation: Actor
- Years active: 1997–present
- Height: 1.93 m (6 ft 4 in)
- Spouse: Vanessa Lóes (m. 2001)
- Children: 3

Thiago Ribeiro Lacerda (born 19 January 1978) is a Brazilian actor.

== Biography ==
Lacerda spent his childhood between Rio de Janeiro, where he was born, and Recreio, a mining town where his grandparents lived. From the age of three to 16, he devoted himself to swimming, winning more than 170 medals. Convinced that it would be very difficult to make a living in the sport, he abandoned the idea of becoming a professional swimmer and started to make breaks as a model, besides working as a salesman for a clothing store. He attended a course of interpretation to get rid of shyness, which he felt would hinder his career as manager of a bank. He was ashamed of his 1.95 meters in height, confessing, "I thought that everybody was looking at me."

Thiago was studying Business Administration at UERJ when he received an invitation to test for the part of a professor of swimming in Malhação. He resolved to take the risk and was awarded the role. After finishing recording the first scene, he felt he had discovered what he wanted to do in life.

Two years later, the actor appeared as protagonist of the novela Terra Nostra, in which he played Matteo, an Italian immigrant who came to Brazil seeking a better life. Not only did Thiago conquer the actress Ana Paula Arósio in the series, but he conquered all of Brazil and became the leading actor of the Globo network. After his success as Matheo, he participated in the miniseries Aquarela do Brasil and the novelas As Filhas da Mãe and O Beijo do Vampiro. In 2003, he was invited to live the role of Giuseppe Garibaldi in the miniseries A Casa das Sete Mulheres. The actor considered the role a real gift, because, since the time of Terra Nostra, he had studied and admired the life of the Italian revolutionary.

But Thiago realized that success and fame also have their down side. Hounded by paparazzi and gossip media, he sued the journalist and presenter Leão Lobo and Gugu Liberato, who wore swimwear in a program called Domingo Legal claiming to be the actor - and won both cases. "Gossip cannot interfere with the mechanism which governs each and every aspect: respect. If the person does not give me respect, I can do one of two things: either be full of 'porrada' or be civilized. I choose always to be civilized. I think after the measures they took, I learned to be respected."

== Personal life ==
Thiago is married to the actress Vanessa Lóes, and they have one son, Gael, and two daughters: Cora and Pilar.

== Filmography ==
=== Television ===
Year	Title	Role	Notes
1997	Malhação	Lucas Melo "Lula"	Season 3
1998	Hilda Furacão	Aramel	
1998	Pecado Capital	Vicente Lisboa	
1999	Terra Nostra	Matteo Batistela	
2000	Aquarela do Brasil	Mário Lopes	
2001	As Filhas da Mãe	Adriano Araújo	
2002	O Beijo do Vampiro	Count Rogério Villar	Episode: "August 26"
2002	O Beijo do Vampiro	Alberto "Beto" Marques	Episodes: "August 26–29"
2002	Sítio do Picapau Amarelo	Hans Staden	Episode: "As Aventuras de Hans Staden"
2003	A Casa das Sete Mulheres	Giuseppe Garibaldi	
2003	Celebridade	Otávio Albuquerque	Episodes: "October 13–29"
2004	Sob Nova Direção	Pedro	Episode: "Pau na Obra"
2004	Quem vai ficar com Mário?	Mário	End of year special
2005	América	Alexandre "Alex" Camargo	
2006	Páginas da Vida	Jorge Fragoso Martins de Andrade	
2007	Eterna Magia	Conrado O'Neill	
2009	Viver a Vida	Bruno Marcondes	
2010	S.O.S. Emergência	Júnior	Episode: "Cartas na mesa"
2010	As Cariocas	Silvinho	Episode: "A Iludida de Copacabana"
2011	Os Caras de Pau	Himself	Episode: "Seja Terno Enquanto Dure"
2011	Cordel Encantado	King Teobaldo I de Seráfia do Sul	Episode: "April 11th"
2011	A Vida da Gente	Dr. Lúcio Pereira	
2013	A Grande Família	Himself	Episode: "O Duelo"
2013	Joia Rara	Antônio "Toni" Baldo	
2014	Alto Astral	Dr. Marcos Bittencourt	
2016	Liberdade, Liberdade	Tiradentes	Episode: "April 11th"
2016	Haja Coração	Himself	Episode: "July 13th"
2016	A Lei do Amor	Ciro Noronha	
2017	Cidade Proibida	Arlindo Paes	Episode: "Caso Laura"
2017	Zorra	Galã da Federal	Episode: "November 25th"
2018	Orgulho e Paixão	Darcy Williamson	
2019	Gratidão	Narrator	Episode: "January 6th"
2019	Tá no Ar: a TV na TV	Himself	Episode: "March 12"
2020	Salve-se Quem Puder	Himself	Episodes: "January 27th" and "June 24th"
2023	Amor Perfeito	Gaspar Evaristo	

=== Film ===
Year	Title	Role
2002	A Paixão de Jacobina	Franz
2004	Irmãos de Fé	Saint Paul
2006	Muito Gelo e Dois Dedos d'Água	Francisco
2006	If I Were You	Marcos
2010	Segurança Nacional	Marcos Rocha
2013	O Tempo e o Vento	Captain Rodrigo Cambará
2014	Confissões de Adolescente - O Filme	Himself
2020	Um Animal Amarelo	Ricardo
2023	Além de Nós	Artur
2022	Cabo Weber	Co-Director
2022	Água na Boca	Júlio

=== Dubbing ===
Year	Title	Role
2003	Sinbad: Legend of the Seven Seas	Sinbad
2010	Megamind	Metro Man
2014	The Book of Life	Joaquim
2016	The Jungle Book	Shere Khan
2020	Diário de Pilar	Mine owner
2020	Diário de Pilar	The Imperor

== Stage ==
Year	Title	Role
2000–11	Paixão de Cristo	Jesus
2002	O Círculo das Luzes	Racine
2003–04	O Evangelho Segundo Jesus Cristo	Jesus
2008	A República em Laguna	Giuseppe Garibaldi
2008–10	Calígula	Calígula
2012–13	Hamlet	Hamlet
2015–16	Medida por Medida	Angelo
2015–16	Macbeth	Macbeth
