= Qualquer Gato Vira-Lata =

2011 film directed by Tomas Portella

- Theatrical release poster
- Directed by: Tomas Portella
- Screenplay by: Juca de Oliveira; Claudia Levay; Julia Spadaccini; Tati Bernardi
- Based on: Qualquer Gato Vira-Lata tem uma Vida Sexual Mais Saudável que a Nossa by Juca de Oliveira
- Produced by: Pedro Carlos Rovai; LG Tubaldini Jr. Virginia Limberger
- Starring: Cléo Pires; Malvino Salvador; Dudu Azevedo; Rita Guedes
- Cinematography: André Modugno
- Edited by: Marcelo Moraes
- Production companies: Tietê Produções; Globo Filmes; Filmland International; Miravista
- Distributed by: Buena Vista International
- Release date: June 10, 2011
- Running time: 100 minutes
- Country: Brazil
- Language: Portuguese
- Budget: $4–6 million
- Box office: $10,742,238

Qualquer Gato Vira-Lata (lit. "Any Stray Cat") is a 2011 Brazilian romantic comedy film directed by Tomas Portella. Based on the 1998 play Qualquer Gato Vira-Lata tem uma Vida Sexual Mais Saudável que a Nossa (English: Any Stray Cat Has a Healthier Sex Life Than Ours) by Juca de Oliveira, it stars Cléo Pires, Malvino Salvador, and Dudu Azevedo.

A sequel is set to be released in the second half of 2014 with the three main actors and director set to return.

== Plot ==
In Rio de Janeiro, Tati (Cléo Pires) meets her boyfriend Marcelo (Dudu Azevedo) on his birthday and he breaks-up with her, claiming that she is not romantic.

An unbalanced Tati enters the class of the biologist Conrado (Malvino Salvador) and hears his lesson about evolution, where he tells that modern women have destroyed years of evolution with their attitudes and lack of romanticism.

Later, Tati meets Conrado on the street and offers to work with him in his thesis. Conrado teaches Tati the correct behavior of a woman and how to seduce her mate.

Meanwhile, Marcelo feels jealous about Conrado, who feels attracted by Tati and learns that his theory is not correct. A love triangle is formed.

== Cast ==
- Cléo Pires as Tati
- Malvino Salvador as Conrado
- Dudu Azevedo as Marcelo
- Rita Guedes as Olga Portella
- Álamo Facó as Magrão (Paulo Sergio)
- Letícia Novaes as Laura
