= Mal Me Quer =

Brazilian comedy television series

- Genre: Comedy
- Starring: Felipe Abib; Júlia Rabello; Klara Castanho; Chiara Scalett; Lipe Volpato
- Country of origin: Brazil
- Original language: Portuguese
- No. of seasons: 1
- No. of episodes: 6

Production
- Production companies: Boutique Filmes; Warner TV

Original release
- Network: Warner TV (Brazil)
- Release: February 7, 2019

Mal Me Quer is a Brazilian comedy television series that premiered on Warner TV in Brazil on February 7, 2019. It is the first Brazilian comedy original series released by Warner in a co-production with Boutique Filmes.

== Premise ==
After Marcel (Felipe Abib), a travel agent, goes bankrupt because of his business partner, he and his wife Olivia (Júlia Rabello) plot an insane and risky plan. They both decide that the only way to not lose all the properties they have is to get into court with a petition for divorce. As long as they need to do anything to keep this farce, they will find real motives for the divorce.
