= Lucas Malvacini =

Brazilian model and theater and TV actor (born 1989)

- Born: 20 November 1989 (age 35); Juiz de Fora, Minas Gerais, Brazil
- Occupation(s): Model and actor
- Years active: 2013–present
- Television: Amor à Vida and "Vai Que Cola", a television sitcom from Multishow
- Height: 1,83 m

Lucas Malvacini (born 20 November 1989) is a Brazilian model and theater and TV actor. He became known in 2013 for acting in the telenovela "Amor à Vida" of Rede Globo, and for acting in "Vai Que Cola", a television sitcom from Multishow.

== Biography and career ==
In 2011, Lucas was invited to participate in the contest Mister Brazil 2011, he participated and won, competing with the model Renan Oliveira. Lucas has lived in Santiago, Milan and in Miami, currently living in Brazil. In 2013, he appeared in Rede Globo's telenovela "Viver à Vida", playing the character "Anjinho", lover of "Felix" and played by Matheus Solano. In 2015, Lucas Malvacini starred in the play "The Guest", where he was the main star of the plot. More recently, the model and actor was seen on Multishow's television sitcom "Vai Que Cola".

== Filmography ==
Ano	Título	Personagem	Note
2013–14	Amor à Vida	Anjinho	
2016-17	Vai Que Cola	Bombeiro Rômulo	
2019	Verão 90	Edinho	
