= Liberdade, Liberdade =

Brazilian telenovela

- Also known as: Lady Revolution
- Genre: Telenovela; Period drama
- Created by: Maria José de Queiroz
- Based on: Joaquina, Filha do Tiradentes by Maria José de Queiroz
- Developed by: Mário Teixeira
- Written by: Sérgio Marques; Tarcísio Lara Puiati
- Directed by: Vinícius Coimbra
- Starring: Andreia Horta; Mateus Solano; Nathalia Dill; Bruno Ferrari; Dalton Vigh; Caio Blat; Ricardo Pereira; Sheron Menezzes; Rômulo Estrela; Lilia Cabral; Maitê Proença
- Opening theme: "Francisco" (Instrumental) by Milton Nascimento
- Country of origin: Brazil
- Original language: Portuguese
- No. of episodes: 67

Production
- Editors: Alexandre Saggese; Marcos Lisboa; Wilson Fragoso
- Camera setup: Multi-camera
- Running time: 50 minutes
- Production company: Projac

Original release
- Network: TV Globo
- Release: 11 April – 4 August 2016

Liberdade, Liberdade (English title: Lady Revolution; literal meaning: Freedom, Freedom) is a Brazilian telenovela produced and aired by TV Globo between 11 April and 4 August 2016, consisting of 67 episodes. It is the sixth telenovela in the 11 p.m. timeslot. It is based on Joaquina, Filha do Tiradentes, created by Maria José de Queiroz. The telenovela is developed by Mário Teixeira and directed by Vinícius Coimbra.

The telenovela features performances of Andreia Horta, Mateus Solano, Nathalia Dill, Bruno Ferrari, Dalton Vigh, Ricardo Pereira, Caio Blat, Sheron Menezzes, Rômulo Estrela, Maitê Proença and Lilia Cabral in the main roles.

== Production ==
Mariana Ximenes was initially cast for the role, Branca, but was chosen as protagonist in Haja Coração. Marjorie Estiano was also considered before Nathalia Dill was cast.

Filming of initial scenes took place in Diamantina and Minas Gerais that served as the fictitious Vila Rica.

== Plot ==
Born in the 19th century, Joaquina (Mel Maia/Andreia Horta) is the daughter of revolutionary Tiradentes (Thiago Lacerda). A woman ahead of her time who carries in her blood the fight for freedom in Brazil.

As a child, she witnessed her father's death after he fought for people's freedom and was double-crossed by Rubião (Mateus Solano), his sword-arm. She was then taken to Portugal under the care of a revolution sympathizer who adopted her by the name of Rosa. Years later she comes back to Rio, a place of wrongdoing and slave abuse. A great anger at this situation awakens the will to fight she inherited from her father. There she meets Xavier (Bruno Ferrari), a rich Medical school student with a secret revolutionary side to him. Together they will find out they share not only the desire for freedom but a true love for one another.

Then Rubião crosses her path once again. Without knowing she Tiradentes' daughter, the villain will pursue her to marry him, making her life a living hell. But she will also make strong allies like Virgínia (Lília Cabral), a brothel owner who has always supported the revolution.

It is now in Joaquina's hands to end the war her father started. And she will not rest until freedom is written on the pages of history, even if it takes her own blood to do it.

== Cast ==
Actor/Actress	Role
Andreia Horta	Joaquina Maria da Silva Xavier (Rosa Raposo Viegas)
Mateus Solano	José Maria Rubião
Nathalia Dill	Branca Farto Almeida
Bruno Ferrari	Xavier Almeida
Dalton Vigh	Antônio José Raposo Viegas (Dom Raposo)
Caio Blat	André Raposo Viegas
Maitê Proença	Dionísia Raposo Viegas Mantini
Lília Cabral	Virginia
Sheron Menezzes	Bertoleza Raposo Viegas
Marco Ricca	Manuel Henriques (Mão de Luva)
Rômulo Estrela	Gaspar
Ricardo Pereira	Tolentino
Zezé Polessa	Ascensão
Olívia Araújo	Divanilda
Chris Couto	Luzia Farto
Nikolas Antunes	Simão
Osmar Prado	
Letícia Isnard	Simoa
Guilherme Piva	Bruno
Genézio de Barros	Diogo Farto
Marcos Oliveira	Sam Nunes
Hanna Romanazzi	Gironda
Yasmin Gomlevsky	Vida (Vidinha)
Yanna Lavigne	Mirtes Aparecida da Conceição (Mimi)
David Junior	Saviano
Heloisa Jorge	Luanda
Joana Solnado	Anita
Erom Cordeiro	Everaldo
Bukassa Kabengele	Robério
Bruce Gomlevsky	Malveiro
Vitor Thiré	Eziel
Jacque Moura	Erondina
Juliana Carneiro da Cunha	Estela
Ju Colombo	Noca
Dudu Varello	Daniel
Gabriel Chadan	José Joaquim Maia e Barbalho (Vendek)
Raphael Ghanem	Dudu
Laís Pinho	Leidiana
Fernanda Heras	Eunice
João Cunha	Joel
Maria Eduarda Miliante	Yasmin
Mariana Nunes	Blandina
Gabriel Palhares	Carlos Júlio Raposo Viegas (Caju)

=== Guest stars ===
Actor /Actress	Role
Thiago Lacerda	Joaquim José Xavier da Silva (Tiradentes)
Leticia Sabatella	Antonia Maria do Espírito Santo
Mel Maia	Joaquina Maria Xavier da Silva ("child")
Lu Grimaldi	Maria Francisca Isabel de Bragança (D. Maria I)
Lucy Ramos	Malena
Jackson Antunes	Terenciano Mantini

== Reception ==
=== Ratings ===
Timeslot	# Eps.	Premiere		Finale		Rank	Season	Average viewership
Timeslot	# Eps.	Date	Viewers (in points)	Date	Viewers (in points)	Rank	Season	Average viewership
Mondays—Fridays (except Wednesdays); 11 pm	67	11 April 2016	27	4 August 2016	22	#1	2016	19

On a consolidated basis, the debut of the plot registered 27.2 points, achieving the highest ratings for a premiere of the 11pm telenovela since Saramandaia (2013).

The finale, aired on 4 August, registered a viewership rating of 22.3 points. Cumulatively, the telenovela recorded an average rating of 18.5
