= Orgulho e Paixão =

Brazilian costume telenovela

- Also known as: Pride and Passion
- Genre: Romance; Period drama
- Created by: Marcos Bernstein
- Based on: Sense and Sensibility, Pride and Prejudice, Mansfield Park, Emma, Northanger Abbey and Lady Susan by Jane Austen
- Directed by: Fred Mayrink
- Starring: Nathalia Dill; Thiago Lacerda; Agatha Moreira; Vera Holtz; Malvino Salvador; Alessandra Negrini; Gabriela Duarte; Maurício Destri; Murilo Rosa; Chandelly Braz; Pâmela Tomé; Ana Júlia Dorigon; Bruna Griphao; Tato Gabus Mendes; Ricardo Tozzi; Ary Fontoura; Tarcísio Meira; Natália do Vale
- Opening theme: "Doce Companhia" by Lucy Alves
- Country of origin: Brazil
- Original language: Portuguese
- No. of episodes: 162 (100 international version)

Production
- Running time: 31–45 minutes
- Production company: Estúdios Globo

Original release
- Network: TV Globo
- Release: 20 March – 24 September 2018

Related
- Tempo de Amar; Espelho da Vida

Orgulho e Paixão (in English: Pride and Passion) is a Brazilian telenovela produced and broadcast by TV Globo. It premiered on 20 March 2018, replacing Tempo de Amar, and concluded on 24 September 2018, being replaced by Espelho da Vida. Created by Marcos Bernstein, the plot is inspired by the novels: Sense and Sensibility (1811), Pride and Prejudice (1813), Mansfield Park (1814), Emma (1815) Northanger Abbey (1818) and Lady Susan (1871), all by Jane Austen.

== Plot ==
Set in 1910, the plot takes place in the fictional Valley of Café and tells the story of Elisabeta (Nathalia Dill), woman ahead of her time, with dreams and ambitions completely different for a young woman for the period. She is encouraged by her father Felisberto (Tato Gabus Mendes) to realize her dreams. Elisabeta lives with four other sisters, each with a different personality. She will have a turnaround in her life when she meets Darcy (Thiago Lacerda), with whom they will share a great passion.

The characters of Elizabeta, Jane (Pâmela Tomé), and Lídia (Bruna Griphao) are inspired by the book "Pride and Prejudice", while those of Mariana (Chandelly Braz) and Cecília (Anajú Dorigon) are from the novels "Sense and Sensibility" and "Northanger Abbey", respectively. Ema (Agatha Moreira) had her character based on the title character "Emma", Fani (Tammy Di Calafiori) is from the novel "Mansfield Park" and Susana (Alessandra Negrini) is from the short story "Lady Susan".

== Cast ==
- Nathalia Dill as Elisabeta Benedito
- Thiago Lacerda as Darcy Williamson
- Alessandra Negrini as Suzana Vernon
- Vera Holtz as Ofélia Benedito
- Pâmela Tomé as Jane Benedito
- Chandelly Braz as Mariana Benedito
- Ana Júlia Dorigon as Cecília Benedito
- Bruna Griphao as Lídia Benedito
- Tato Gabus Mendes as Felisberto Benedito
- Agatha Moreira as Ema Cavalcante
- Ricardo Tozzi as Xavier Vidal
- Tarcísio Meira as Lorde Williamson
- Gabriela Duarte as Julieta Bittencourt, Rainha do Café
- Maurício Destri as Camilo Bittencourt
- Joaquim Lopes as Olegário
- Malvino Salvador as Coronel Brandão
- Isabella Santoni as Charlotte Williamson
- Rodrigo Simas as Ernesto Pricelli
- Ary Fontoura as Afrânio Cavalcante, Barão de Ouro Verde
- Murilo Rosa as Jorge
- Marcelo Faria as Aurélio Cavalcante
- Grace Gianoukas as Petúnia
- Christine Fernandes as Josephine Tibúrcio
- Oscar Magrini as Almirante Tibúrcio
- Marcos Pitombo as Rômulo Tibúrcio
- Bruno Gissoni as Diogo Uirapuru
- Juliano Laham as Luccino Pricelli
- Rosane Gofman as Nicoletta Pricelli
- Silvio Guindane as Januário de Souza
- Laila Zaid as Ludmila de Albuquerque
- Tammy Di Calafiori as Fani Pricelli
- Miguel Rômulo as Randolfo
- Fábio Villa Verde as Lobato
- Priscila Marinho as Tenória Pereira
- JP Rufino as Trajano Pereira (Estilingue - en. Slingshot)
- Theo de Almeida Lopes as Tadeu
- Amauri Reis as François
- Emmilio Moreira as Vicente
- Giordano Becheleni as Virgilio Pricelli
- Jairo Mattos as Gaetano Pricelli
- Pedro Henrique Müller as Captain/Major Otávio
- Tony Correia as Manoel
- Vania de Brito as Agatha

=== Guest cast ===
- Letícia Persiles as Amélia
- Daniela Carvalho as Carolina
- Adriana Machado
- Rosana Bittencourt as Princess of Café

== Soundtrack ==
Orgulho e Paixão (Trilha Sonora da Novela)

Soundtrack album by Various artists
- Released: 20 April 2018
- Length: 45:16
- Label: Som Livre

Orgulho e Paixão (Trilha Sonora da Novela) is the soundtrack of the telenovela, released on 20 April 2018 by Som Livre.

No.	Title	Artist(s)	Length
1.	"Doce Companhia (Dulce compañia)"	Lucy Alves	3:25
2.	"Estrada Branca"	Chitãozinho & Xororó	3:26
3.	"Mais Bonito Não Há"	Milton Nascimento & Tiago Iorc	3:58
4.	"Fica"	Anavitória ft. Matheus & Kauan	3:05
5.	"Lembra"	Luiza Possi	3:37
6.	"Se Você Jurar"	Mumuzinho	3:13
7.	"Dono da Razão"	Wilson das Neves	3:23
8.	"Nômade"	Renato Godá	2:50
9.	"Erva Venenosa (Poison Ivy)"	Valentina Francisco	3:49
10.	"Te Amo Tanto"	Paolo & Cláudia Leitte	3:09
11.	"Menina de Vento"	Zanna	3:54
12.	"Noites com Sol"	Flavio Venturini	3:59
13.	"Mais que o Tempo"	Taryn	3:28
Total length:			45:16

== Ratings ==
Season	Timeslot (BRT/AMT)	Episodes	First aired		Last aired		Avg. viewers (points)
Season	Timeslot (BRT/AMT)	Episodes	Date	Viewers (in points)	Date	Viewers (in points)	Avg. viewers (points)
1	Mon–Sat 6:15 p.m.	155	20 March 2018	21	24 September 2018	24	21.4
