= The Great Victory (2014 film) =

2014 film directed by Stefano Capuzzi

A Grande Vitória
- Theatrical release poster
- Directed by: Stefano Capuzzi
- Written by: Stefano Capuzzi; Paulo Marcelo do Vale Tavares
- Based on: Aprendiz de Samurai by Max Trombini
- Produced by: Stefano Capuzzi
- Starring: Caio Castro; Sabrina Sato; Suzana Pires; Moacyr Franco
- Music by: João Carlos Martins
- Production company: Alfa Filmes
- Distributed by: Downtown Filmes; Paris Filmes
- Release date: 8 May 2014 (Brazil)
- Running time: 90 minutes
- Country: Brazil
- Language: Portuguese

The Great Victory (Portuguese: A Grande Vitória) is a 2014 Brazilian sports drama film based on the book Aprendiz de Samurai by Max Trombini. This film adaptation was directed by Stefano Capuzzi Lapietra. Starring Caio Castro and Sabrina Sato, it tells the true story of the judoka Max Trombini, who had a humble and troubled childhood. Through judo, the boy becomes involved with martial arts principles and thus learns to settle down emotionally. He subsequently starts building a career, becoming one of the greatest judo coaches in Brazil.

== Plot ==
Max Trombini had a humble and troubled childhood. Abandoned by the father when still young, he was raised by his mother and grandfather, who died when he was 11 years old. Disgusted, he began to get in all sorts of trouble in his hometown, Ubatuba, and then in Bastos, where he lived. It was through learning martial arts, particularly judo, through which he managed to level out emotionally and build a career.

== Cast ==
- Caio Castro as Max Trombini
  - Felipe Falanga as young Max
- Sabrina Sato as Alice
- Suzana Pires as Tereza Maximiano
- Tato Gabus Mendes as Sensei Josino
- Domingos Montagner as César Trombini
- Moacyr Franco as Benedito Maximiano
- Ratinho (Carlos Massa) as Carlão
- Felipe Folgosi as Flávio
- Rosi Campos as Principal Célia
- Tuna Dwek as Maria José
- Max Trombini as Mr. Ariovaldo, Max's teacher
- Ênio Gonçalves
- Ken Kaneco

== Production ==
In order to play the judoka Max Trombini, Caio used his own experience in the sport. He practiced judo as a child, but he didn't get very far in terms of graduation. Some scenes of the film were filmed at the traditional academy Vila Sônia, in São Paulo. It was there that the Olympic champion Aurélio Miguel began practicing the sport and where Caio made an immersion with renowned technicians as the masters Massao and Luiz Shinohara, current men's team coach.

Trombini himself plays Ariovaldo, Max's P.E. teacher at school and one of his judo trainers.
