= Adriana Birolli =

Brazilian actress

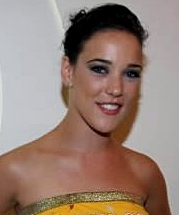
- Born: Adriana Birolli Ferreira; 25 November 1986 (age 39); Curitiba, Brazil
- Occupation: Actress

Adriana Birolli Ferreira (born 25 November 1986), known professionally as Adriana Birolli, is a Brazilian actress. She was born in Curitiba, Paraná.

== Selected filmography ==
- Faça Sua História (2008)
- Beleza Pura (2008)
- Viver a Vida (2009)
- Fina Estampa (2011)
- Império (2014)
- Belaventura (2017)
