= Klara Castanho =

Brazilian actress and singer

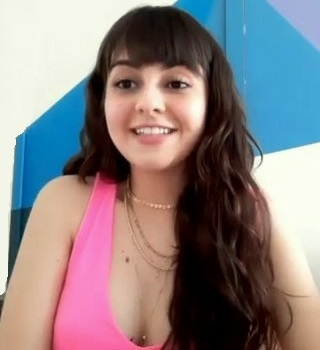
- Castanho in 2021
- Born: Klara Forkas Gonçalez Castanho; 6 October 2000 (age 25); Santo André, São Paulo, Brazil
- Occupation(s): Actress, singer
- Years active: 2006–present

Klara Forkas Gonçalez Castanho (born 6 October 2000) is a Brazilian actress and singer. She is best known by her roles in telenovelas Viver a Vida and Amor à Vida, as well for her role in Netflix series Back to 15.

== Filmography ==
Television Series
| Year | Title | Role | Notes |
|---|---|---|---|
| 2006 | Mothern | Bel | Episode: "O Nascimento da Mothern" Episode: "Família" |
| 2008–2009 | Revelação | Daniela Mourão | Supporting role |
| 2009–2010 | Viver a Vida | Rafaela Victória Vilella Garcia | Leading role |
| 2011 | Morde & Assopra | Antônia de Souza Martins "Tonica" | Leading role |
| 2012 | Amor Eterno Amor | Clara Allende / Adelia Borges | Leading role |
| 2013–2014 | Amor à Vida | Paula Khoury Araújo "Paulinha" | Leading role |
| 2015–2016 | Além do Tempo | Alice del Cosso Ventura | |
| 2018 | Popstar | Contestant | Season 2, 12th place |
| 2019 | Mal Me Quer | Manuela | |
| 2022–2024 | Good Morning, Verônica | Ângela Cordeiro | |
| 2022–2024 | Back to 15 | Carol Rocha | |
| 2024 | Dança dos Famosos | Contestant | Season 21 |
| 2024 | Bookaboo | Herself | Episode: "Lá Fora" |
| 2024–2025 | Garota do Momento | Eugênia Honório | |

Films
| Year | Title | Role | Notes |
|---|---|---|---|
| 2009 | Quanto Dura o Amor? | Commercial Actress #2 | Uncredited |
| 2016 | É Fada! | Julia Ribeiro Pontes | Leading role |
| 2017 | Chocante | Dora Maranhão | |
| 2017 | 1817: A Revolução Esquecida | Maria Teodora da Costa | |
| 2018 | Tudo por um Popstar | Manuela "Manu" Pereira | Leading role |
| 2021 | Confessions of an Invisible Girl | Teanira "Tetê" Oliveira | Leading Role |
| 2021 | Galeria Futuro | Bruna | |
| 2022 | D.P.A.3 – Uma Aventura no Fim do Mundo | Dunhoca | |
| 2023 | Apanhador de Almas | Emília | Leading Role |
| 2024 | Férias Trocadas | Romária "Rô" | Leading Role |
| 2024 | Salve Rosa | Rosa | Leading Role |

=== Internet ===
| Year | Title | Role | Notes |
|---|---|---|---|
| 2016 | Absurdices | Mariah | Episode: "Xaveco de pai" |
