= Confessions of an Invisible Girl =

2021 film by Bruno Garotti

- Official release poster
- Portuguese: Confissões de uma Garota Excluída
- Directed by: Bruno Garotti
- Screenplay by: Bruno Garotti; Flávia Lins e Silva; Christiana Oliveira
- Based on: Confissões de uma Garota Excluída, Mal Amada e (Um Pouco) Dramática by Thalita Rebouças
- Starring: Marcus Bessa; Caio Cabral; Klara Castanho
- Distributed by: Netflix
- Release date: 22 September 2021
- Running time: 91 minutes
- Country: Brazil
- Language: Portuguese

Confessions of an Invisible Girl (Portuguese: Confissões de uma Garota Excluída) is a 2021 Brazilian teen comedy film directed by Bruno Garotti from a screenplay he co-wrote with Flávia Lins e Silva and Christiana Oliveira, based on the 2016 novel Confissões de uma Garota Excluída, Mal Amada e (Um Pouco) Dramática by Thalita Rebouças. The film stars Marcus Bessa, Caio Cabral and Klara Castanho.

== Synopsis ==
When the clever but socially awkward Tetê joins a new school, she'll do anything to fit in. However, the queen bee, among her classmates, has other ideas.

== Cast ==
- Marcus Bessa as Zeca
- Caio Cabral
- Klara Castanho as Tetê
- Fernanda Concon as Laís
- Rosane Gofman
- Júlia Gomes as Valentina
- Gabriel Lima as Davi
- Kiria Malheiros
- Stepan Nercessian
- Lucca Picon
- Júlia Rabello
- Alcemar Vieira
