= Caio Castro =

Brazilian actor and model

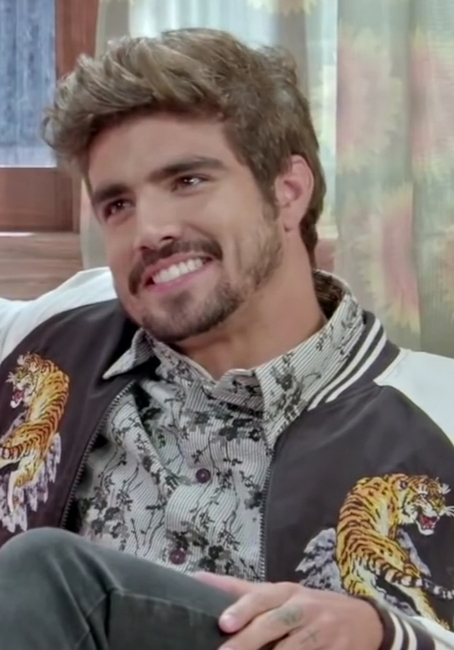
- Castro in 2019
- Born: Caio de Castro Castanheira; 22 January 1989 (age 37); Praia Grande, São Paulo, Brazil
- Occupations: Actor, model, racing driver
- Years active: 2008–present
- Partner(s): Maria Casadevall (2013–2015); Grazi Massafera (2019–2021)
- Children: Valentina Castro (deceased)

Caio de Castro Castanheira (born 22 January 1989), is a Brazilian actor, model and amateur racing driver who competes in the Porsche GT3 Carrera Cup Series.

== Early life ==
Castro was born in Praia Grande, a city located on the coast of the state of São Paulo. At the age of 18, he left his parents' home in São Paulo to live in an apartment in Barra da Tijuca, Rio de Janeiro. Castro was discovered in a contest on Caldeirão do Huck television show, before that he worked with event production.

== Filmography ==
Television
Year	Title	Role	Notes
2008–2010	Malhação	Bruno Oliveira Guimarães	
2010	Ti Ti Ti	Edgar Sampaio	
2011	Fina Estampa	José Antenor da Silva Pereira	
2013	Amor à Vida	Michel Gusmão	Supporting
2015	I Love Paraisópolis	Grego	
2017	Novo Mundo	Pedro I of Brazil	
2018	Are You the One? Brasil	Himself	Host
2019	A Dona do Pedaço	Rock Souza Macondo	
2022	Todas as Flores	Pablo Xavier	

Film
Year	Title	Role	Notes
2014	Confissões de Adolescente	Himself	
2014	A Grande Vitória	Max Trombini	
2016	Se a Vida Começasse Agora	Beto	

== Awards and nominations ==
Year	Award	Category	Title of Work	Result	Ref.
2008	Prêmio Jovem Brasileiro	Best Male Revelation	Malhação	Won	
2011	Prêmio Contigo de TV	Best Lead Actor	Ti Ti Ti	Nominated	
2011	Meus Prêmios Nick	Boy of Year	Ti Ti Ti	Won	
2012	Troféu Imprensa	Best Actor	Fina Estampa	Nominated	
2012	Prêmio Contigo de TV	Best Lead Actor	Fina Estampa	Nominated	
2012	Prêmio Extra de Televisão	Ídol Teen	Fina Estampa	Nominated	
2013	Prêmio Jovem Brasileiro	Best Actor	Amor à Vida	Won	
2013	Meus Prêmios Nick	Boy of Year	Amor à Vida	Nominated	
2013	Prêmio Extra de Televisão	Ídol Teen	Amor à Vida	Won	
2013	Capricho Awards	Best Actor	Amor à Vida	Won	
2013	Capricho Awards	Boy national	Amor à Vida	Won	
2013	Capricho Awards	Best Kiss (with Maria Casadevall)	Amor à Vida	Nominated	
