= Tammy Di Calafiori =

Brazilian actress and television host

- Born: Tammy Di Calafiori; March 10, 1989 (age 37); Rio de Janeiro, Brazil
- Occupations: Actress and host
- Years active: 2005–present

Tammy Di Calafiori (born March 10, 1989) is a Brazilian actress and television host. She has played the lead role in the telenovela Ciranda de Pedra.

== Career ==
Born in Rio de Janeiro, her first work was in the 2005 telenovela Alma Gêmea, by Walcyr Carrasco, playing Nina, sister of Vitório, played by Malvino Salvador. Tammy Di Calafiori played one of the lead roles, Vírginia Prado, daughter of Ana Paula Arósio's character, named Laura Prado, in the 2008 Rede Globo telenovela Ciranda de Pedra, playing the same character as Lucélia Santos in the 1980s version of the telenovela.

Telenovela author Sílvio de Abreu invited her to join the cast of the 2010 telenovela Passione, when she played a patricinha (Brazilian version of valley girl) character named Lorena Gouveia, daughter of Stella Gouveia, played by Maitê Proença. Both characters get involved in a love triangle with Daniel de Oliveira's character, named Agnello Mattoli.

Tammy Di Calafiori was announced in 2012 as one of the hosts of the Brazilian version of the American sports channel Fox Sports, thus making her debut has a reporter and as a sports host.

== Filmography ==
=== Television ===
Television
Year	Title	Role
2005	Alma Gêmea	Nina Santini
2008	Ciranda de Pedra	Virgínia Toledo Silva Prado
2010	Passione	Lorena Gouveia
2012	Fora de Controle	Diana
2012	As Brasileiras	Episode: Maria do Brasil
2012	Fox Sports	TV presenter
2014	Milagres de Jesus	Diná
2015-2016	Os Dez Mandamentos	Ana
2016	Haja Coração	Nicole
2016	Magnífica 70	Melissa
2017	O Rico e Lázaro	Lía
2018	Orgulho e Paixão	Fany Pricelly

=== Cinema ===
Television
Year	Title	Role
2008	Meu Nome Não é Johnny	Young Laura
2010	A Suprema Felicidade	Marilyn Monroe
2012	Primeiro Dia de um Ano Qualquer	Lívia
2014	Confissões de Adolescente - O Filme	Talita
2016	Os Dez Mandamentos - O Filme	Ana

=== Theater ===
Television
Year	Title	Role
2012	Casório	
2013	A Minha Primeira Vez	
2017	A Minha Primeira Vez	
