= Viver a Vida =

Brazilian telenovela

- Also known as: Seize the Day
- Genre: Telenovela
- Created by: Manoel Carlos
- Starring: Taís Araújo; José Mayer; Giovanna Antonelli; Thiago Lacerda; Alinne Moraes; Mateus Solano; Lília Cabral; Bárbara Paz; Klara Castanho
- Opening theme: "Sei Lá... A Vida Tem Sempre Razão" by Miúcha and Antônio Carlos Jobim
- Country of origin: Brazil
- Original language: Portuguese
- No. of episodes: 209; 100 (international version)

Production
- Camera setup: Multiple-camera setup
- Running time: 50 minutes
- Production company: Central Globo de Produção

Original release
- Network: Rede Globo
- Release: September 14, 2009 – May 14, 2010

Viver a Vida (literally: Living Life, English title: Seize the Day) is a Brazilian telenovela broadcast by TV Globo from September 14, 2009 to May 14, 2010. It is written by Manoel Carlos in collaboration with Ângela Chaves, Cláudia Lage, Daisy Chaves, Juliana Perez and Maria Carolina. Directed by Teresa Lamprey, Frederico Mayrink, Luciano Sabino, Leonardo Nogueira, Adriano Mello and Maria José Rodrigues. It is directed by Jayme Monjardim and Fabrício Mamberti. Topbilled by Taís Araújo, José Mayer, Lília Cabral and Alinne Moraes and Mateus Solano. Originally it ran for 209 episodes but internationally the episodes are condensed into 100.

== Plot ==
Luciana is a spoiled model whose envy of supermodel Helena extends beyond the catwalk. As the story unfolds, Helena meets, falls in love and marries Luciana‘s father, Marcos, a womanizer who ends up betraying Helena with Dora.

During a trip, a serious accident causes Luciana to become paraplegic, thus changing hers and everybody‘s lives. When her fiancé Jorge can’t handle her disability, she turns to his twin brother and doctor Miguel, who comes to her aid, becoming Luciana‘s hope of recovery. Together, they will face the challenges of overcoming her condition and will fall in love.

At the end of the soap opera, Alice accepts to be part of the relationship with Osmar and Narcisinho, and they end up together.

== Cast ==
Actor	Character
Taís Araújo	Helena Toledo Ribeiro
José Mayer	Marcos Ribeiro
Lília Cabral	Tereza Saldanha Ribeiro
Alinne Moraes	Luciana Saldanha Ribeiro
Mateus Solano	Miguel Assunção de Moraes
Mateus Solano	Jorge Assunção de Moraes
Thiago Lacerda	Bruno Martins
Bárbara Paz	Renata Ferreira
Giovanna Antonelli	Dora Regina Vitória Vilela Campos
Klara Castanho	Rafaela Vitória Campos
Paloma Bernardi	Mia Saldanha Ribeiro
Letícia Spiller	Betina Trindade Silva
Natália do Vale	Ingrid Assunção de Moraes
Nelson Baskerville	Leandro de Moraes Assunção
Marcello Airoldi	Gustavo Ferreira Silva
Aparecida Petrowki	Sandra Toledo Barbosa (Sandrinha)
Adriana Birolli	Isabel Saldanha Ribeiro
Daniele Suzuki	Ellen Koboldt
Max Fercondini	Ricardo Antunes
Camila Morgado	Maria Lúcia Trindade (Malu)
Christine Fernandes	Ariane Vidgal
Maria Luisa Mendonça	Alice Soares Gurgel
Leonardo Miggiorin	Flávio Vilela (Flavinho)
Rodrigo Hilbert	Felipe Euller
Lica Oliveira	Edite Toledo
Cecília Dassi	Clarisse Ferreira Silva
Bruno Perillo	Bernardo Gaudêncio
Marcelo Valle	Osmar Duarte
Marcello Melo Jr.	Benedito Sampaio (Benê)
Priscila Sol	Telma Paixão (Paixão)
Carolina Chalita	Suzana Borges
Lolita Rodrigues	Noêmia Ribeiro
Sandra Barsotti	Iolanda Martinez
Cris Nicolotti	Regina Ferreira
Ângela Barros	Celeste Felippa
Leonardo Machado	Léo Jordão
Nanda Costa	Soraia Vilela
Mila Moreira	Apresentadora
Laércio de Freitas	Oswaldo Toledo
Miwa Yanagizawa	Tomie Koboldt
Cláudio Jaborandy	Onofre
Patrícia Naves	Sílvia Sampaio
Patrícia Carvalho-Oliveira	Larissa
Rafaela Fischer	Raquel Bôscoli
Thaíssa Carvalho	Cida Santos
César Mello	Ronaldo Toledo
Cyria Coentro	Matilde Vilela
Antônio Firmino	André
Melissa Vettore	Amélia Ynizd
Beto Nasci	Afonso
Michel Gomes	Paulo Toledo
Rogério Romera	Lucas
Carlos Casagrande	Carlos
Arieta Corrêa	Laura
Cristina Flores	Léa
Lionel Fischer	Dr. Moretti
Isabel Mello	Lívia
Chris Moniz	
Sheila Mattos	Zilda
Débora Nascimento	Roberta
Roberta Almeida	Nice
Ana Carolina Dias	Caru
Luiza Valdetaro	Glória
Natasha Haydt	Anna
Thianna Bialli	Fanny Fernandes
Léo Branchi	Helcinho
Caio Manhente	Gabriel

=== Special appearances ===
Actor	Character
Sarah Oliveira	
Babu Santana	Coisa Ruim

== Audience ==
Timeslot (BT)	# Eps.	Premiere		Finale		TV Season	Average viewership
Timeslot (BT)	# Eps.	Date	Premiere ratings (in points)	Date	Finale ratings (in points)	TV Season	Average viewership
Monday–Saturday; 9:15 pm	209	September 14, 2009	43.0	May 14, 2010	47.0	2009–10	36
