= Ricardo Tozzi =

Brazilian actor (born 1975)

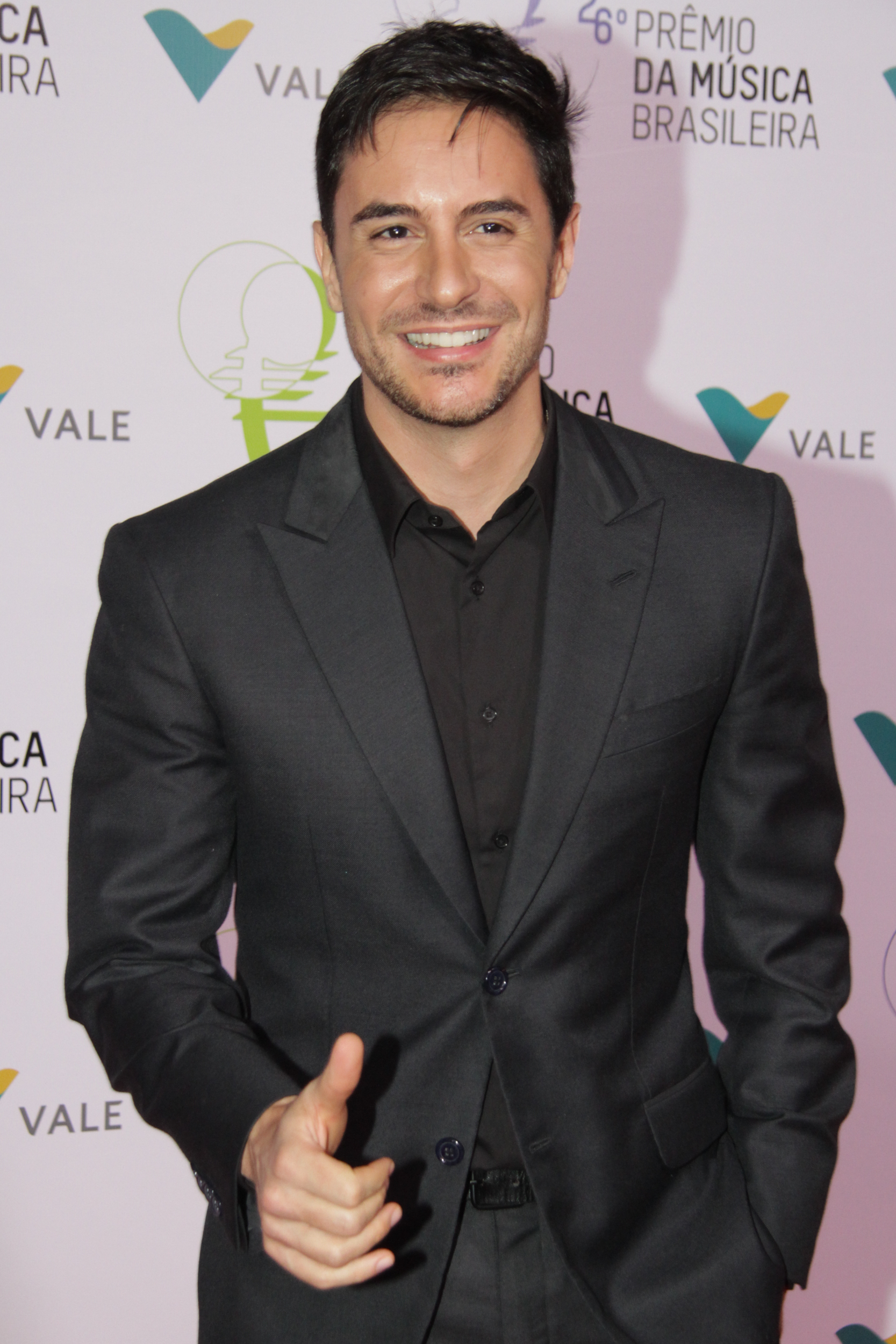
- Tozzi at the Brazilian Music Awards
- Born: Ricardo Tozzi; August 18, 1975 (age 50); Campinas, São Paulo, Brazil
- Occupation: Actor
- Years active: 2005-present

Ricardo Tozzi (born August 18, 1975) is a Brazilian actor. He was known for playing characters in the novels Insensato Coração, Cheias de Charme e Amor à Vida.

== Biography ==
He graduated in Business Administration and dropped his career as an executive to work on novels.

It premiered on television in soap operas Bang Bang, as the doctor Harold. In July 2007, broke up with actress Daniele Suzuki.

In 2006, Ricardo took the novel Pé na Jaca and in 2007, the show Malhação.

After participating in the series of episodes of TV Globo, Ricardo in 2009, he joined the cast of the novel India – A Love Story.

In 2010, Ricardo was in the theater with the play written and directed Colapso of Hamilton Vaz Pereira. In the cast are also Osmar Prado, André Mattos, Lena Brito and Emanuelle Araújo. Also in 2010, staged the play Hell, along with Bárbara Paz, directed by Hector Babenco. Also that year, part of the series S.O.S. Emergência and A Vida Alheia.

In 2011, he was in the telenovela Insensato Coração by Gilberto Braga and Ricardo Linhares. In 2012, he was in the miniseries Dercy de Verdade, he played the acrobat Vito Tadei.

In Cheias de Charme, the actor will play two characters, the motoboy Inácio and singer Fabian.

In 2013, again with the soap operas Amor à Vida of Walcyr Carrasco, it interprets the plot Thales.

The actor has recently came out in a Twitter live, while answering a question by one of his followers on his relationship with Reynaldo Giannecinni. Later on he informed that "he was just joking".

In 2014, about 3 months after the end of Amor à Vida, is cast to play Herval in Geração Brasil, repeating the partnership with the authors, Filipe Miguez and Izabel de Oliveira again.

== Filmography ==
Television
| Year | Title | Role | Notes |
|---|---|---|---|
| 2005 | Bang Bang | Dr. Harold Phinter | |
| 2006 | A Diarista | Geílson | Ep: "Andaime Paciência" |
| 2006 | Dança dos Famosos 3 | Himself | Reality show of Domingão do Faustão |
| 2006 | Pé na Jaca | Primo Cândido (Cândido Fortuna Botelho Bulhões) | |
| 2007 | Malhação | Fábio Mancini | |
| 2007 | Casos e Acasos | Freitas | Ep: "Pilot" |
| 2007 | Conexão Xuxa | Himself | Participant of Nova Equipe Azul |
| 2008 | Casos e Acasos | Rodrigo | Ep: "O Triângulo, a Tia Raquel e o Pedido" |
| 2008 | Casos e Acasos | Renan | Ep: "O Trote, o Filho e o Fora" |
| 2008 | Dicas de Um Sedutor | Paulo | Ep: "Amor e Fantasia" |
| 2008 | Guerra e Paz | Amílcar | Ep: "Delírios & Verdades" |
| 2009 | India – A Love Story | Komal Meetha | |
| 2010 | S.O.S. Emergência | Márcio | Ep: "Na Saúde e na Doença" |
| 2010 | A Vida Alheia | Flávio Zanca | Ep: "A Babá" |
| 2011 | Insensato Coração | Douglas Batista | |
| 2012 | Dercy de Verdade | Vito Tadei | |
| 2012 | Cheias de Charme | Inácio Paixão / Fabian Brunini | |
| 2013 | Zorra Total | Felipe Montalban | Cameo |
| 2013 | Amor à Vida | Thales Brito | |
| 2014 | Geração Brasil | Herval | |
| 2016 | A Lei do Amor | Augusto Tavares | |
| 2018 | Orgulho e Paixão | Xavier Vidal | |
