= Cabocla =

2004 Brazilian telenovela

- Genre: Telenovela
- Created by: Benedito Ruy Barbosa
- Written by: Edmara Barbosa; Edilene Barbosa
- Directed by: Ricardo Waddington
- Starring: Vanessa Giácomo; Daniel de Oliveira; Patrícia Pillar; Tony Ramos; Mauro Mendonça; Carolina Kasting; Regiane Alves; Danton Mello; Reginaldo Faria; Elena Toledo; Sebastião Vasconcelos; Vera Holtz; Otávio Augusto; Jussara Freire; Malvino Salvador; Othon Bastos; Eriberto Leão; Maria Flor
- Opening theme: "Madrigal"
- Composers: Lazza, Schiavon e Deluqui
- Country of origin: Brazil
- Original language: Portuguese
- No. of episodes: 167

Production
- Running time: 45 minutes
- Production company: Central Globo de Produção

Original release
- Network: Rede Globo
- Release: 10 May – 20 November 2004

Related
- Chocolate com Pimenta; Como uma Onda

Cabocla is a Brazilian telenovela produced and broadcast by Rede Globo. It premiered on 10 May 2004, replacing Chocolate com Pimenta, and ended on 20 November 2004, replaced by Como uma Onda. The telenovela is written by Ricardo Waddington, with the collaboration of Edmara Barbosa and Edilene Barbosa. It is based on the 1979 telenovela of the same name and originally shown on Rede Globo.

It stars Vanessa Giácomo, Daniel de Oliveira, Tony Ramos, Patrícia Pillar, Mauro Mendonça, Carolina Kasting, Regiane Alves, Danton Mello, Eriberto Leão, Maria Flor and Malvino Salvador in the leading roles.

== Plot ==
Louis Jerome is a rich young man. A womanizer, he spends all night drinking and having fun with prostitutes, but then he discovers that he is suffering from pneumonia.

On the advice of Edmund Esteves, his doctor, he decides to spend a season on the farm of a cousin in the town of Vila da Mata Espirito Santo, in search of fresh air, to prevent the disease from developing into tuberculosis, a very common occurrence among bohemians in that period of history - the late 1910s, approximately in 1918.

When Louis Jerome comes to town, he stays in the hotel of the couple Bina Sinha, an Indian, and Joe Station, the grandson of a Portuguese, to wait for his cousin, Colonel Boanerges, who will take him to his farm.

In just one night at the hotel, he marvels at the daughter of Joe and Bina, the half-breed shy and aloof Zuca. To fall in love, they face much resistance because of social differences and the fact that Zuca is portrayed as stubborn.

Their love is also challenged by the arrival of the Spanish Pepa, who us in love with Luis, and who is a former lover of the rich young man. She is established on the neighboring farm, owned by Colonel Justin, a widower, and Colonel Boanerges' political enemy.

Beside the main plot, a political row unfolds between the two colonels in the region: Boanerges and Justin, rivals in politics and in a local power struggle.

Alongside this struggle, there is the true love story of Cats and Neco. She is the daughter of Boanerges and Emerenciana, he, of Justin, which makes this a kind of Romeo and Juliet hillbilly match.

Neco becomes a new leader in the town. Well-intentioned, he may work for the people of the region, even facing the might of the colonels.

Amid all this, the feelings of Mariquinha, daughter of Colonel Justin and sister of Neco by Tobias, surface, causing a love quartet to result, together with the love of Louis Jerome and Zuca.

== Cast ==
- Vanessa Giácomo as Zuca (Zulmira de Oliveira Vieira Pires)
- Daniel de Oliveira as Luís Jerônimo Vieira Pires
- Patrícia Pillar as Emerenciana de Sousa Pereira (Ciana)
- Tony Ramos as Coronel Boanerges de Sousa Pereira
- Malvino Salvador as Tobias de Oliveira Pinto
- Mauro Mendonça as Coronel Justino (Manuel Justino Caldas)
- Carolina Kasting as Mariquinha (Maria Junqueira Caldas de Oliveira Pinto)
- Regiane Alves as Belinha (Elizabeth Emerenciana de Sousa Pereira Junqueira Caldas)
- Danton Mello as Neco (Manuel Junqueira Caldas)
- Eriberto Leão as Tomé
- Reginaldo Faria as Joaquim Vieira Pires
- Sebastião Vasconcelos as Felício Pinto
- Vera Holtz as Generosa de Oliveira Pinto
- Otávio Augusto as Zé da Estação (José de Oliveira)
- Jussara Freire as Siá Bina (Balbina de Oliveira)
- Othon Bastos as Dr. Edmundo Esteves
- Oscar Magrini as Capitão Macário
- John Herbert as Vigário Gabriel
- Umberto Magnani as Coronel Chico Bento (Francisco Bento)
- Alexandre Rodrigues as Zaqueu
- Mareliz Rodrigues as Pequetita Novais Vieira Pires
- Maria Flor as Tina (Cristina de Oliveira Pinto)
- Elena Toledo as Pepa, la Sevillana (Pepa Junqueira Caldas)
- Roberta Rodrigues as Julieta
- Cosme dos Santos as Nastácio
- Cláudio Gabriel as Onofre
- Edyr de Castro as Maria
- Rogério Falabella as Dr. Teles
- Aisha Jambo as Ritinha
- Cláudio Galvan as Chico da Venda (Francisco do Espírito Santo)
- Vitor Hugo as Tião
- Renata Di Carmo as Rute
- Fernando Petelinkar as Xexéu
