= Fina Estampa =

Brazilian television series

- Genre: Telenovela; Romance
- Created by: Aguinaldo Silva
- Directed by: Wolf Maya
- Starring: Lília Cabral; Christiane Torloni; Dalton Vigh; Carolina Dieckmann; Malvino Salvador; Sophie Charlotte; Caio Castro; Adriana Birolli
- Country of origin: Brazil
- Original language: Portuguese
- No. of episodes: 185 (140 International version)

Production
- Running time: 50 minutes

Original release
- Network: TV Globo
- Release: August 22, 2011 – March 23, 2012

Related
- Marido en Alquiler (2013)

Fina Estampa (Looks & Essence) is a Brazilian telenovela that first aired on TV Globo between August 22, 2011 and March 23, 2012 in 185 chapters.

== Synopsis ==
Set in Rio de Janeiro, Fina Estampa centers on Griselda, a tough, hard-working handywoman with a very well-defined set of values. She managed to raise her small children on her own when her husband disappeared. Now she lives with her three adult children and one grandson in a fancy neighborhood where she does odd jobs and is well-known and liked by everyone. However, her life is far from easy. Her daughter Maria Amália is hard-working like herself, but becomes involved with Rafael, a young man with dubious morals. Her son Quinzé was left by his wife, Teodora, who also left behind their small child. Her other son, Antenor, a medical student who is embarrassed by Griselda's humble ways, will do anything to keep her away from his life. He falls in love with Patrícia, the daughter of René, a renowned chef and restaurant owner, and Teresa Cristina, a vain, arrogant, unscrupulous woman whose favorite pastime is tormenting her nutty housekeeper, Crô. René is smitten with Griselda's simple but honorable approach to life, arousing jealousy in Teresa Cristina, who eventually becomes her biggest rival taking revenge to the next level with her manipulative ways. Tensions arise after Griselda wins the lottery and people suddenly turn up, like her "dead" husband, Pereirinha, and her son's ex-wife. She will have to face the excessive ambitions of her son, her rival, and ex-husband, among others.

== Cast ==
- Lília Cabral as Griselda da Silva Pereira (Pereirão)
- Christiane Torloni as Tereza Cristina Buarque Siqueira de Velmont
- Dalton Vigh as Renê Velmont
- Carolina Dieckmann as Teodora Bastos da Silva
- Malvino Salvador as Quinzé (Joaquim José da Silva Pereira)
- Sophie Charlotte as Maria Amália da Silva Pereira
- Caio Castro as José Antenor da Silva Pereira
- Adriana Birolli as Patrícia Siqueira de Velmont
- Paulo Rocha as Guaracy Martins
- Marcelo Serrado as Crodoaldo Valério (Crô)
- Júlia Lemmertz as Esther Wolkoff Siqueira
- Renata Sorrah as Danielle Steiner Fraser
- Milena Toscano as Vanessa Tavares Ribas
- Eva Wilma as Maria Íris de Siqueira Maciel
- Arlete Salles as Vilma Moreira Prado
- Dira Paes as Celeste Souza Fonseca
- Alexandre Nero as Baltazar Fonseca
- Dudu Azevedo as Wallace Mu
- Marco Pigossi as Rafael Fernandes
- Cris Vianna as Dagmar dos Anjos
- Wolf Maya as Álvaro Siqueira
- Totia Meireles as Zambeze Siqueira
- Guilherme Boury as Daniel
- Carlos Casagrande as Juan Guilherme Passarelli
- Tania Khalill as Letícia Fernandes Prado
- Suzana Pires as Marcela/Joana Coutinho
- Juliana Knust as Zuleika
- Thaís de Campos as Alice
- Mônica Carvalho as Glória Monteiro
- Monique Alfradique as Beatriz Lobo
- Ana Rosa as Celina
- Isabel Fillardis as Doctor Mônica Ramos
- Júlio Rocha as Enzo Pereira
- Carol Macedo as Solange de Souza Fonseca
- Carlos Machado as Ferdinand
- Joana Lerner as Luana
- Ricardo Blat as Severino
- Rafael Zulu as Edvaldo
- Eri Johnson as Gigante (Honório)
- Rosa Marya Colin as Zilá
- Guida Vianna as Isolina
- Michelle Martins as Fernanda
- Bianca Salgueiro as Carolina Fernandes Prado
- Luma Costa as Nanda
- Ana Carolina Dias as Deborah
- Ítalo Guerra as Reinaldo
- Alexandra Martins as Márcia
- David Lucas as Renê Velmont Júnior
- Guilherme Leicam as Fábio
- Vitor David as Leonardo dos Anjos
- Marcelo Brou as Pezão (Maurício)
- Christian Monassa as Max
- Sandro Pedroso as Mandrake
- Fábio Keldani as Victor
- Carlos Vieira as Fred
- Aline Matheus as Clara
- Ângela Vieira as Mirna Bello

== Reception ==
=== Ratings ===
Timeslot	# Eps.	Premiere		Finale		Rank	Season	Average viewership
Timeslot	# Eps.	Date	Premiere share	Date	Finale share	Rank	Season	Average viewership
Monday—Saturday; 9:15 pm	185	22 August 2011	41	March 23, 2012	47	#1	2011-2012	39

=== Awards and nominations ===
Year	Award	Category	Nominated	Result
2012	Troféu Imprensa	Best Telenovela	Aguinaldo Silva	Nominated
2012	Troféu Imprensa	Best Actress	Lília Cabral	Won
2012	Troféu Imprensa	Best Actress	Christiane Torloni	Nominated
2012	Troféu Imprensa	Best Actor	Caio Castro	Nominated
2012	Melhores do Ano	Best Actress	Lília Cabral	Won
2012	Melhores do Ano	Best Actress	Christiane Torloni	Nominated
2012	Melhores do Ano	Best Supporting Actor	Marcelo Serrado	Won
2012	Melhores do Ano	Best Supporting Actress	Júlia Lemmertz	Nominated
2012	Melhores do Ano	Best Male Revelation	Paulo Rocha	Nominated
2012	Melhores do Ano	Best Child Performance	Gabriel Pelícia	Nominated
2012	Prêmio Contigo! de TV	Best Telenovela	Aguinaldo Silva	Nominated
2012	Prêmio Contigo! de TV	Best Actress	Lília Cabral	Won
2012	Prêmio Contigo! de TV	Best Actress	Christiane Torloni	Nominated
2012	Prêmio Contigo! de TV	Best Actress	Carolina Dieckmann	Nominated
2012	Prêmio Contigo! de TV	Best Actor	José Mayer	Nominated
2012	Prêmio Contigo! de TV	Best Actor	Caio Castro	Nominated
2012	Prêmio Contigo! de TV	Best Actor	Dalton Vigh	Nominated
2012	Prêmio Contigo! de TV	Best Actor	Malvino Salvador	Nominated
2012	Prêmio Contigo! de TV	Best Supporting Actor	Alexandre Nero	Nominated
2012	Prêmio Contigo! de TV	Best Supporting Actor	David Lucas	Nominated
2012	Prêmio Contigo! de TV	Best Supporting Actor	Marcelo Serrado	Won
2012	Prêmio Contigo! de TV	Best Supporting Actor	Marco Pigossi	Nominated
2012	Prêmio Contigo! de TV	Best Supporting Actress	Dira Paes	Nominated
2012	Prêmio Contigo! de TV	Best Supporting Actress	Suzana Pires	Nominated
2012	Prêmio Contigo! de TV	Best Supporting Actress	Sophie Charlotte	Nominated
2012	Prêmio Contigo! de TV	Best Child Performance	Gabriel Pelícia	Nominated
2012	Prêmio Contigo! de TV	Best Child Performance	Vitor Colman	Nominated
2012	Prêmio Contigo! de TV	Best Revelation	Paulo Rocha	Nominated
2012	Prêmio Contigo! de TV	Best Revelation	Rodrigo Simas	Nominated
2012	Prêmio Contigo! de TV	Best Author	Aguinaldo Silva	Nominated
2012	Prêmio Contigo! de TV	Best Director	Wolf Maya	Nominated
2012	Prêmio Extra de Televisão	Best Telenovela	Aguinaldo Silva	Nominated
2012	Prêmio Extra de Televisão	Best Actor	Marcelo Serrado	Won
2012	Prêmio Extra de Televisão	Best Actress	Christiane Torloni	Nominated
2012	Prêmio Extra de Televisão	Best Supporting Actress	Carolina Dieckmann	Nominated
2012	Prêmio Extra de Televisão	Ídol Teen	Caio Castro	Nominated
2012	Prêmio Extra de Televisão	Best Costume Design	Fina Estampa	Nominated
