= Lília Cabral =

Brazilian actress

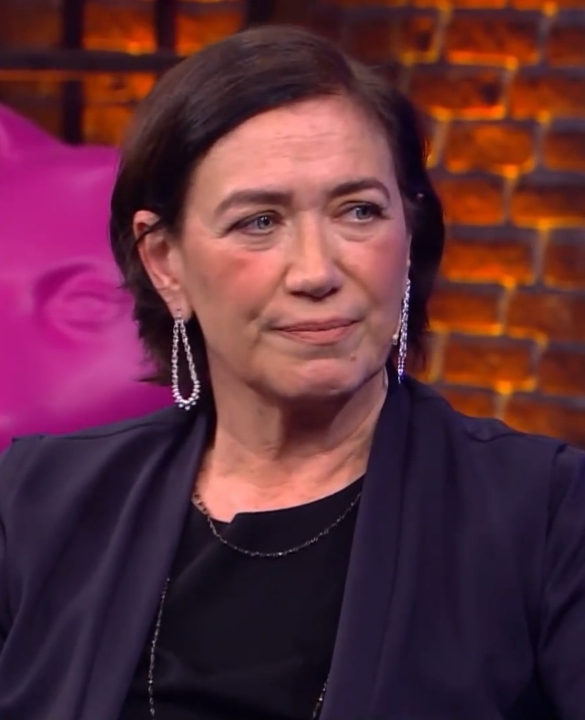
- Lilia Cabral on the Lady Night program in 2021.
- Born: Lília Cabral Bertolli; 13 July 1957 (age 69); Lapa, São Paulo, Brazil
- Occupation: Actress
- Years active: 1978–present
- Spouses: João Henrique Jardim (m. 1986; div. 1992) Iwan Figueiredo (m. 1994)
- Children: Giulia Bertolli (daughter)
- Parent(s): Gino Bertolli (father); Almedina Cabral (mother)

Lília Cabral Bertolli Figueiredo (born 13 July 1957) is a Brazilian actress. She has already been nominated twice to the International Emmy Award for Best Actress, for her roles as Marta in Pages of Life (2006–2007) and as Tereza in Seize the Day (2009–2010).

== Biography ==
She is daughter of an Italian father, Gino Bertolli, and a Portuguese mother, Almedina Cabral, who was born in São Miguel, Azores. Lilia lost her mother when she was very young, before she started working in television, which she deeply resents, as her mother never had the opportunity to see her work as an actress. She is from the São Paulo neighborhood of Lapa, where she spent her childhood, but has lived in Rio de Janeiro for over twenty years.

== Career ==
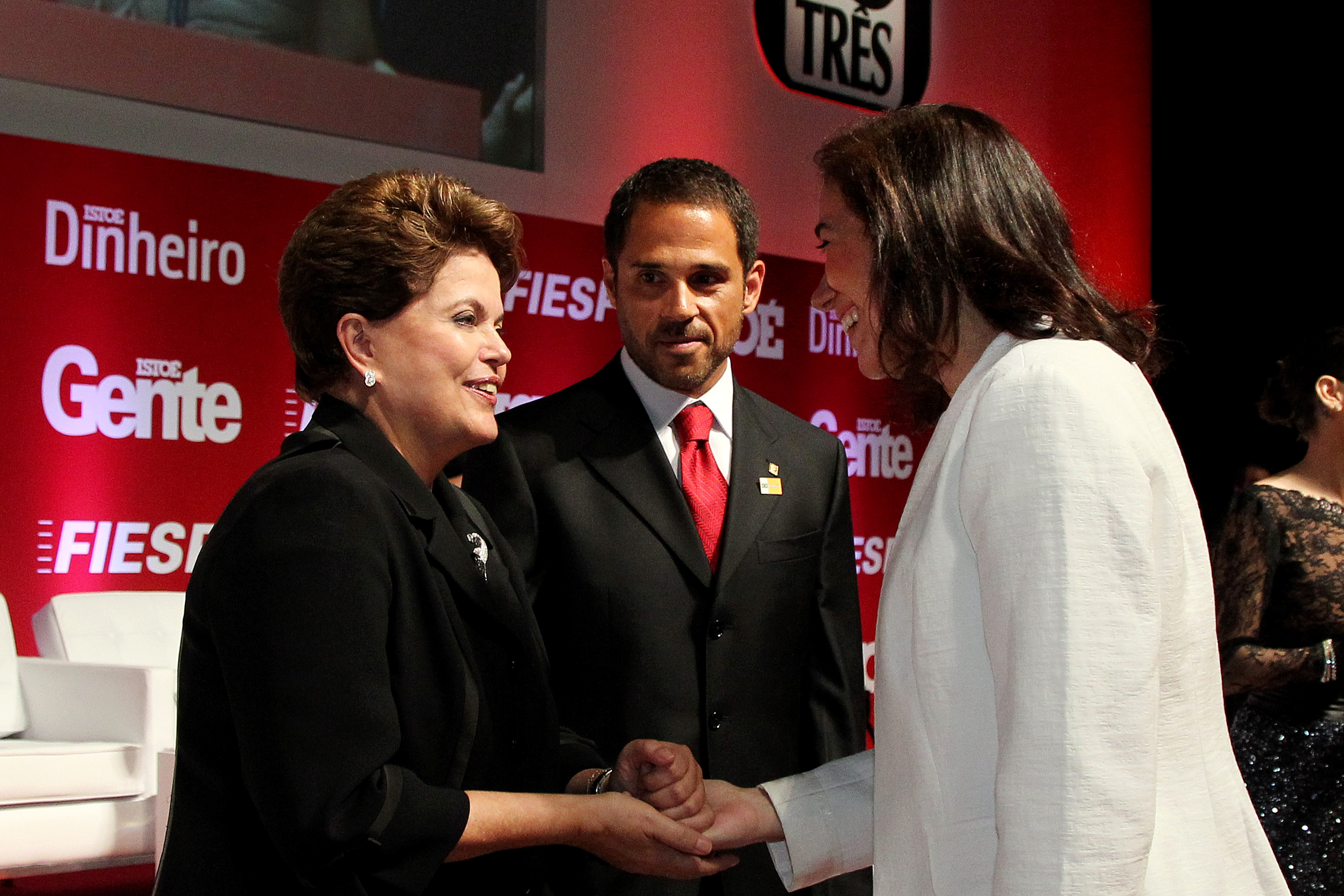
Lília (right) meets Brazilian president Dilma Rousseff (left) at the "Person of the year" event.

Cabral began her career in the theater performing in the play Feliz Ano Velho, based on a book by Marcelo Rubens Paiva.

She debuted on television in 1981 in the telenovela Os Adolescentes, written by Ivani Ribeiro and produced by Rede Bandeirantes.

In 1984, she signed contract with Rede Globo to act in Corpo a Corpo, by Gilberto Braga, and there she remains today.

In 2003, Lilia Cabral participated in Chocolate com Pimenta as the comic villainess Bárbara. Later, she joined the cast of Começar de Novo as Aída, the owner of a famous spa.

In 2006, she starred as the main antagonist in Páginas da Vida as the insensitive bitter Marta. For her brilliant performance she received the Trophy Press award for Best Actress. She was also nominated for an International Emmy Award for Best Actress in 2007, but she lost the award to the French actress Muriel Robin for her part as Marie Besnard in The Poisoner.

In 2010, she was nominated for the second time to the International Emmy Award for Best Actress for her role in the telenovela Viver a Vida.

Cabral starred as the protagonist Griselda Pereira in the telenovela Fina Estampa in 2011. In 2012, she won two Best Actress awards for her excellent portrayal of Griselda.

== Personal life ==
Her first marriage to filmmaker João Henrique Jardim lasted from 1986 to 1992. Since 1994, she has been married to the economist Iwan Figueiredo, who is the father of her only daughter, Giulia Bertolli, who was born when Lilia was 38. She suffered three miscarriages before her pregnancy.

== Filmography ==
=== Television ===
Year	Title	Role	Notes
1981	Os Adolescentes	Marcela	
1982	Os Imigrantes	Angelina	
1982	Os Imigrantes: Terceira Geração	Angelina	
1984	Corpo a Corpo	Margarida Fraga Dantas	
1985	De Quina pra Lua	Marieta	
1986	Hipertensão	Antonieta "Tatá"	
1987	Mandala	Lena	First phase
1988	Vale Tudo	Aldeíde Candeias	
1989	Tieta	Amorosa de Jesus "Amorzinho"	
1991	Salomé	Ernestina	
1991	O Portador	Luciana	
1992	Você Decide	Arminda "Mindinha"	Episode: "Cigarra ou Formiga"
1992	Pedra sobre Pedra	Alva	
1993	Sex Appeal	Clarisse Fonseca	
1994	Você Decide	Neusinha	Episode: "A Copa do Mundo é Nossa"
1994	Pátria Minha	Simone Pelegrine	
1994	História de Amor	Sheila Bueno	
1995	Engraçadinha... Seus Amores e Seus Pecados	Eduarda	
1995	Confissões de Adolescente	Gilda	Episode: "Por Um Triz"
1996	Você Decide		Episode: "Pai de Aluguel"
1997	Anjo Mau	Goreti Garcia	
1998	Dona Flor e Seus Dois Maridos	Violeta	
1998	Sai de Baixo	Miriam	Episode: "O Casamento do Meu Melhor Amigo"
1998	Você Decide		Episode: "Ligeiramente Grávida"
1998	Meu Bem Querer	Verena Alves Serrão	
1999	Você Decide	Laura	Episode: "Ligeiramente Grávida"
1999	Você Decide	Claudete	Episode: "Robin Hood Aposentado"
1999	Mulher	Dalva	Episode: "Mãe Menina"
1999	Malhação	Cláudia Almeida	Season 6
2000	Laços de Família	Ingrid Frank Lacerda	Episodes dated 5 July – 3 October
2001	Estrela-Guia	Daphne Pimenta	
2001	Brava Gente	Isadora	Episode: "Preozas do Finado Zacarias"
2001	Os Normais	Amanda	Episode: "Surpresas São Normais"
2001	Sai de Baixo	Dora	Episode: "Família de Aluguel"
2002	Sítio do Picapau Amarelo	Hera	Cameo
2002	A Grande Família	Margot Pereba	Episodes: "Explode Coração" / "Vai Para o Trono ou Não Vai" / "Noiva em Fúria"
2002	Sabor da Paixão	Edith	
2003	Chocolate com Pimenta	Bárbara Albuquerque	
2004	A Diarista	Pinky	Episode: "Mulheres Que Enchem o Saco Demais"
2004	Começar de Novo	Aída	
2005	A História de Rosa	Dra. Estela Duncar	Globo Special, 40 years
2006	A Grande Família	Margot	Episode: "A Malvada"
2006–07	Páginas da Vida	Marta Toledo Flores	
2007	A Diarista	Dona Elvira	Episode: "Aquela da Doida"
2007	Toma Lá, Dá Cá	Dra. Mísia	Episode: "Freud Já Não Explica Mais"
2008–09	A Favorita	Catarina Coppola Monteiro	
2009–10	Viver a Vida	Tereza Saldanha	
2011	Divã	Mercedes	
2011–12	Fina Estampa	Griselda da Silva Pereira "Pereirão"	
2013	Saramandaia	Vitória Vilar	
2014–15	Império	Maria Marta Medeiros de Mendonça e Albuquerque	
2016	Tá no Ar: a TV na TV	False Helena / Globeleza	Episode: "January 18th" Episode: "February 2"
2016	Liberdade, Liberdade	Virgínia	
2017	A Força do Querer	Silvana Garcia	
2018	O Sétimo Guardião	Valentina Marsalla / Marlene Rocha	
2019	Tá no Ar: a TV na TV	Herself	Episode: "February 12th"
2019	Zorra	Dona Sandra / Herself	Episode: "November 2"
2020	Todas as Mulheres do Mundo	Dionara	Episode: "Dionara"
2020	Salve-se Quem Puder	Herself	Episode: "March 13th"
2023	Fuzuê	Maria Isabel Azevedo Montebello "Bebel"	
2024–25	Garota do Momento	Maristela Alencar	

=== Film ===
Year	Title	Role
1989	Better Days Ahead	Desk
1990	Stelinha	Chris
1990	Assim na Tela Como no Céu	Mary Magdalene
1998	Como Ser Solteiro	Analyst
2001	A Partilha	Lúcia
2009	Divã	Mercedes Cunha Ribeiro
2011	Amor?	Laura
2014	Julio Sumiu	Edna
2019	Maria do Caritó	Maria do Caritó "Caritó"
2021	A Lista	Laurita (Short-film)
2023	Tire 5 Cartas	Fátima

== Stage ==
Ano	Título	Papel
1978	Marat Sade	Charlotte Cordeille
1979	Divinas Palavras	Marigaila
1981	Seda Pura e Alfinetadas	Mannequin
1981	De Como Dia Virou Noite e a Noite..	
1982	Cinderela, Cinderela	
1983–84	Feliz Ano Velho	
1986	Miss Banana	
1988	Delicadas Torturas	
1989	JK	Sarah Kubitscheck
1989	Machado em Cena — Um Sarau Carioca	
1991	La Ronde	
1992	Baile de Máscaras	
1993–94	Solteira, Casada, Viúva, Divorciada	4 characters
1996	Futuro do Pretérito	
2002–03	Unha e Carne	Isadora
2005–09	Divã	Mercedes
2010–15	Maria do Caritó	Maria do Caritó
2020–23	A Lista	Laurita

== Literature ==
Year	Title	Author	Notes
2007	Descobrindo Lília Cabral	By Analu Ribeiro	Biography

== Awards and nominations ==
Year	Award	Category	Nominated	Result
2006	Troféu Imprensa	Best Actress	Páginas da Vida	Won
2007	International Emmy	Best Actress	Páginas da Vida	Nominated
2007	Prêmio Contigo! de TV	Best Actress	Páginas da Vida	Won
2007	Prêmio APCA	Best Actress	Páginas da Vida	Won
2008	Prêmio Qualidade Brasil	Best Supporting Actress	A Favorita	Won
2008	Melhores do Ano	Best Supporting Actress	A Favorita	Nominated
2009	Festival de Cinema Brasileiro de Miami	Best Actress	Divã	Won
2009	Troféu Imprensa	Best Actress	Viver a Vida	Won
2009	Melhores e Piores - TV Press	Best Actress	Viver a Vida	Won
2009	Melhores da Revista da TV - O Globo	Best Actress	Viver a Vida	Won
2009	Prêmio Quem de Televisão	Best Actress	Viver a Vida	Won
2009	Melhores e Piores - IG	Best Actress	Viver a Vida	Won
2010	International Emmy	Best Actress	Viver a Vida	Nominated
2011	Prêmio Quem de Televisão	Best Actress	Fina Estampa	Nominated
2012	Troféu Imprensa	Best Actress	Fina Estampa	Won
2012	Melhores do Ano	Best Actress	Fina Estampa	Won
2012	Prêmio Contigo! de TV	Best Actress	Fina Estampa	Won
2014	Melhores do Ano	Best Actress	Império	Nominated
2014	Prêmio Extra de Televisão	Best Actress	Império	Won
2014	Prêmio Quem de Televisão	Best Actress	Império	Nominated
2015	Troféu Imprensa	Best Actress	Império	Won
2015	Prêmio Contigo! de TV	Best Actress	Império	Won
