= Amor à Vida =

Brazilian telenovela by Walcyr Carrasco

- Genre: Telenovela; Drama
- Created by: Walcyr Carrasco
- Directed by: Wolf Maya
- Starring: Paolla Oliveira; Malvino Salvador; Mateus Solano; Vanessa Giácomo; Susana Vieira; Antônio Fagundes; Juliano Cazarré; Elizabeth Savalla; Tatá Werneck; Eliane Giardini; José Wilker
- Theme music composer: Gonzaguinha
- Opening theme: "Maravida" by Daniel
- Composer: Yuri Cunha
- Country of origin: Brazil
- Original language: Portuguese
- No. of episodes: 221; 160 (International version)

Production
- Production locations: Machu Picchu, Peru; São Paulo, Brazil
- Editors: Carlos Thadeu; Valéria de Barros; Roberto Mariano; William Alves Correia; Andre Leite
- Camera setup: Multiple-camera setup
- Running time: 70 minutes

Original release
- Network: Globo
- Release: 20 May 2013 – 31 January 2014

Amor à Vida (English: Trail of Lies (Note: Official name in English.)) is a Brazilian telenovela created by Walcyr Carrasco. It premiered on 20 May 2013 on TV Globo in the 9 pm timeslot and ended on 31 January 2014. It is directed by Wolf Maya and Mauro Mendonça Filho.

Starring Paolla Oliveira, Malvino Salvador, Mateus Solano, Vanessa Giácomo, Susana Vieira, Antônio Fagundes, Juliano Cazarré, Elizabeth Savalla, Bárbara Paz, José Wilker among others.

== Plot ==
=== First phase ===
2001 – The story revolves around a wealthy family's struggles for control of the renowned San Magno Hospital, in São Paulo. The hospital belongs to the Khoury family, headed by general practitioner César Khoury (Antonio Fagundes). Most of the family are doctors: Caesar's wife, Pilar (Susana Vieira), is a retired dermatologist and Paloma (Paolla Oliveira), the couple's youngest daughter, has just been accepted to a college to study medicine after several unsuccessful attempts in other areas. Only Felix (Mateus Solano), the eldest son, shows no motivation to follow the same career, but he doesn't lack ambition. Since he couldn't be a doctor, Felix studied administration so he could work on the hospital board and plans to one day head the family business. Felix is gay, but married a stylist Edith (Bárbara Paz) only to keep up appearances.

To commemorate Paloma's acceptance into college, the family travels to Machu Picchu in Peru, where Paloma meets Ninho (Juliano Cazarré), a backpacker who adopts a lifestyle free of rules, and who Paloma falls in love. Tired of fighting with her mother, she decides to leave the family and college to live with Ninho. The couple spends about a year hitchhiking aimlessly around South America, living in intense passion, until Paloma discovers she is pregnant. Without money and thinking about the baby's future, she decides to return to her parents' home in São Paulo, and convinces Ninho to go with her.

To pay for the ticket, Ninho decides to smuggle drugs during the trip. However, Ninho is detained at the airport in Bolivia after being found with drugs on his body. Paloma flies back to São Paulo alone and trusts her brother to help her face their family. Felix convinces his sister that it would be better to keep her pregnancy a secret. Back in her parents' house, Felix's wife, Edith, helps Paloma disguise her pregnancy by wearing baggy clothes to avoid raising suspicion. Near the end of Paloma's pregnancy, Ninho leaves prison and goes to São Paulo. Felix pretends to help the couple, but really he plans to get rid of them and become the sole heir of the family. Paloma decides to leave home to be with Ninho, but is caught by her parents who are shocked to realize that she is expecting a baby. After arguing with her mother, Paloma leaves and spends the night in a bar with Ninho. After a lot of drinking to celebrate his release from jail, Ninho has a nasty argument with Paloma and says he does not want to start a family. Very disappointed, Paloma sends him away. In her state of anxiety Paloma goes into premature labor, and ends up giving birth to a girl in the bathroom of the bar with the help of bar patron Marcia (Elizabeth Savalla), a former "chacrete" (TV dancer). Felix, who had gone in search of his sister, arrives at the bar to find Paloma unconscious in the bathroom with no one but her newborn daughter at her side. Marcia had called an ambulance and left for fear of being arrested.

Feeling threatened by the infant heir of the Khoury family, Felix kidnaps the child and leaves her in a dumpster in an alley. When she awakes, Paloma cannot find the baby and is convinced that her daughter was mysteriously stolen without a trace. Paloma's path will soon intersect with Bruno (Malvino Salvador), a kind man who just lost his wife and his newborn son due to complications in childbirth. While distressed by that incident, and wandering the streets, Bruno finds Paloma's daughter in a dumpster after he hears her crying. Bruno sees the incident as a divine sign, a chance for him to start a new life, and takes the baby girl home. Bruno receives help from his mother, a nurse named Ordália (Eliane Giardini), who works at the San Magno hospital, as well as an ob/gyn named Glauce (Leona Cavalli). Glauce helps Bruno keep the baby without having to go through the formal adoption process. He asks Glauce to change the hospital record to report that his wife gave birth to two children: a boy, who died, and a surviving girl. In love with Bruno, Glauce does what he asks, risking her career. A pact is made between Bruno, Ordália, and Glauce that this secret will never be revealed.

=== Second phase ===
2013 – 12 years have passed, and Paloma, after ending her relationship with Ninho, apologizes to her parents and decides to follow a medical career working as a pediatrician at her father's hospital. She chooses pediatrics so that she can work with kids to compensate for the loss of her daughter, whom she believes is still alive somewhere. What Paloma does not realize is that her missing daughter is one of her most beloved patients: Paula (Klara Castanho), a very sweet and smart girl. Paloma has always had a very strong and affectionate bond with Paula, regardless of the fact that Paula is actually Paloma's daughter, and her closeness to Paula forces her to cross paths with Bruno, Paula's father. Paloma and Bruno, who had met years earlier when Paloma had admitted and nursed Paulinha unaware that she was really her daughter. The two separate, but before they realize, they are living together again. Paulinha especially approves of the relationship because she loves Paloma.

United by fate, Bruno, Paloma and Paula are happy until Ninho returns to Brazil determined to regain his relationship with Paloma. Fate holds moments of joy and sadness, revelations and dilemmas. At one point, Paula suffers a serious illness and blood tests reveal that Paloma is the only one who can donate an organ, due to the extremely close similarity of their blood. Suspicious, Paloma secretly orders a DNA test and discovers that Paula is her daughter. She becomes convinced that Bruno stole her daughter twelve years earlier, and their once-close relationship turns to hate. With Ninho, Paloma decides to take Bruno to court to regain custody of Paula. What Paloma cannot imagine is that the real culprit for all this is her brother, Felix, who now, in addition to Paloma, has another an obstacle in his path: Paulinha. Felix is aided by Glauce, who previously in love with Bruno, is happy to hurt Paloma in any way possible. Bruno hires lawyer Silvia (Carol Castro) to defend him.

In addition, the marriage of Cesar and Pilar is threatened by the arrival of the new medical secretary, Aline (Vanessa Giacomo), a beautiful young woman with a mysterious past who will do anything to seduce the head of the hospital and gain revenge on César, who she believes is responsible for the tragedies in her young life.

=== Side plots ===
Also depicted is the gay couple, Niko (Thiago Fragoso) and Eron (Marcello Antony), who plan to have a child through artificial insemination. They ask Niko's close friend Amarilys (Danielle Winits) to be their surrogate, but she falls in love with Eron creating a love triangle that threatens to ruin Niko and Eron's relationship.

== Cast ==
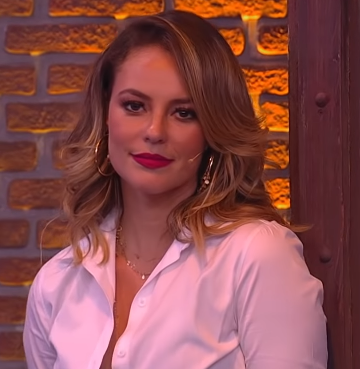
Paolla Oliveira as Paloma

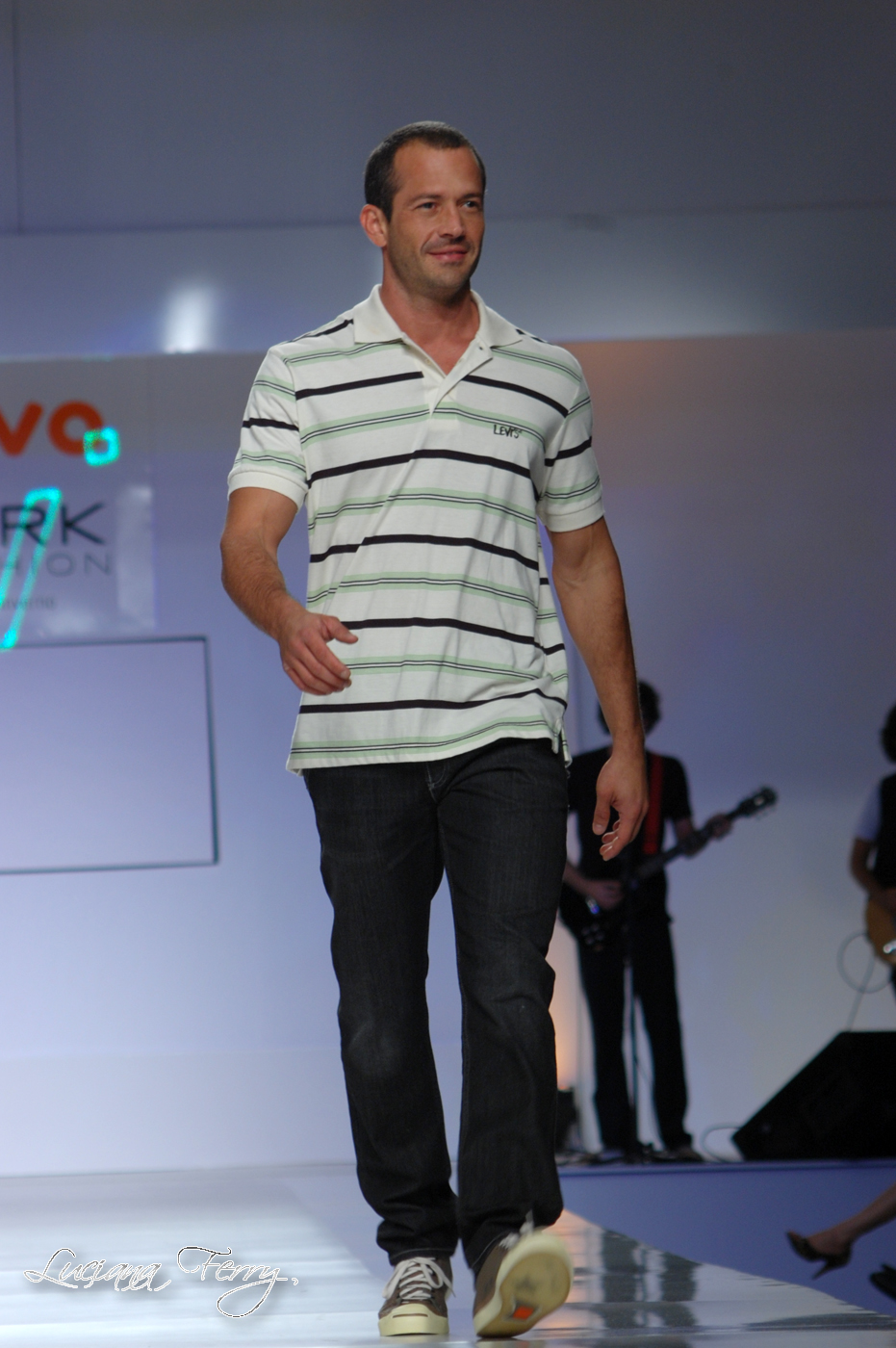
Malvino Salvador as Bruno

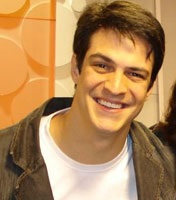
Mateus Solano as Félix

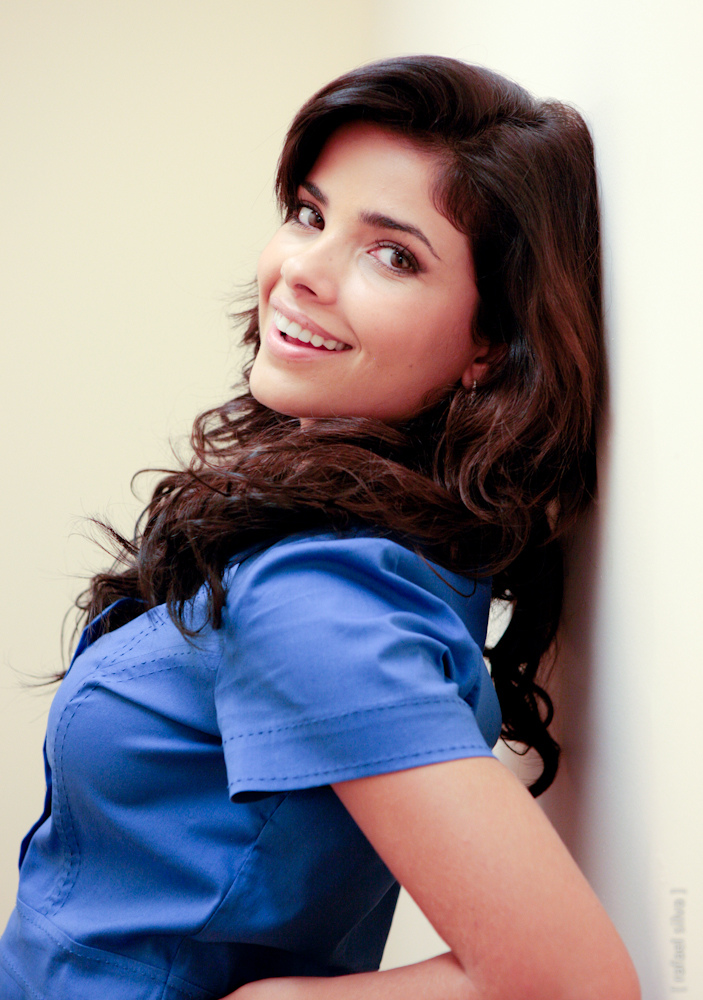
Vanessa Giácomo as Aline

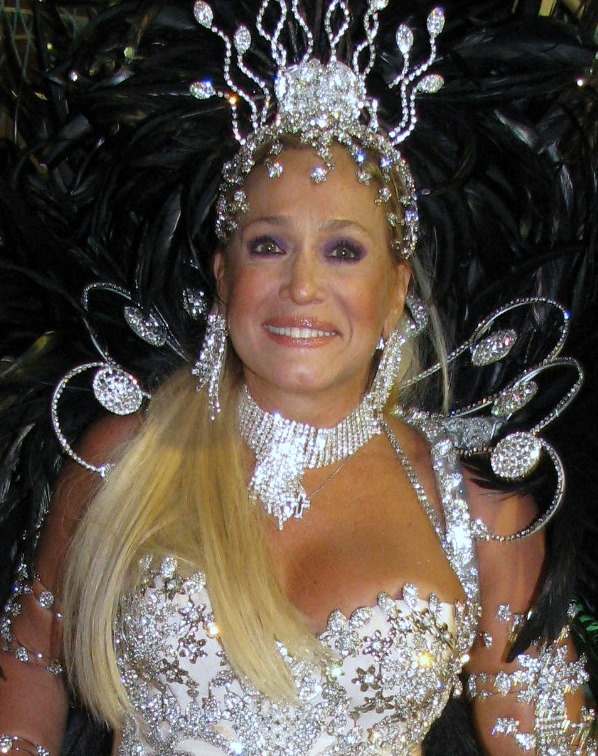
Susana Vieira as Pilar

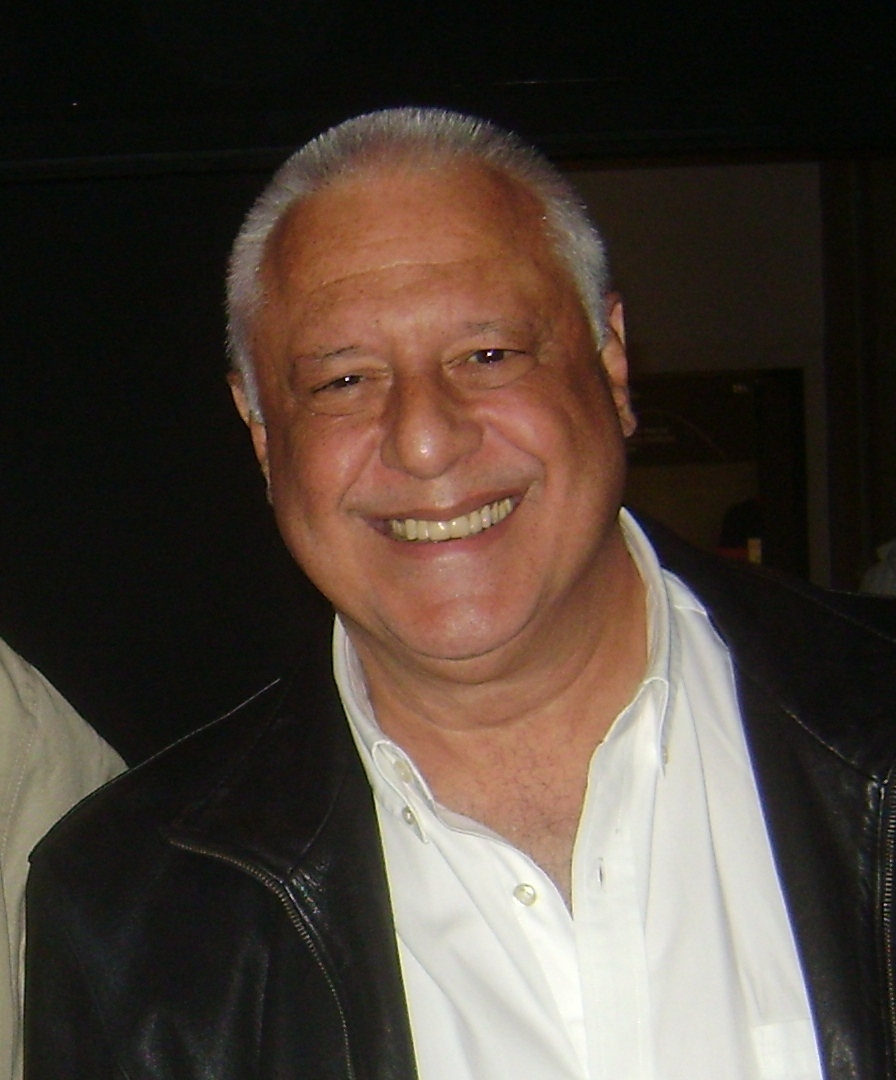
Antônio Fagundes as César

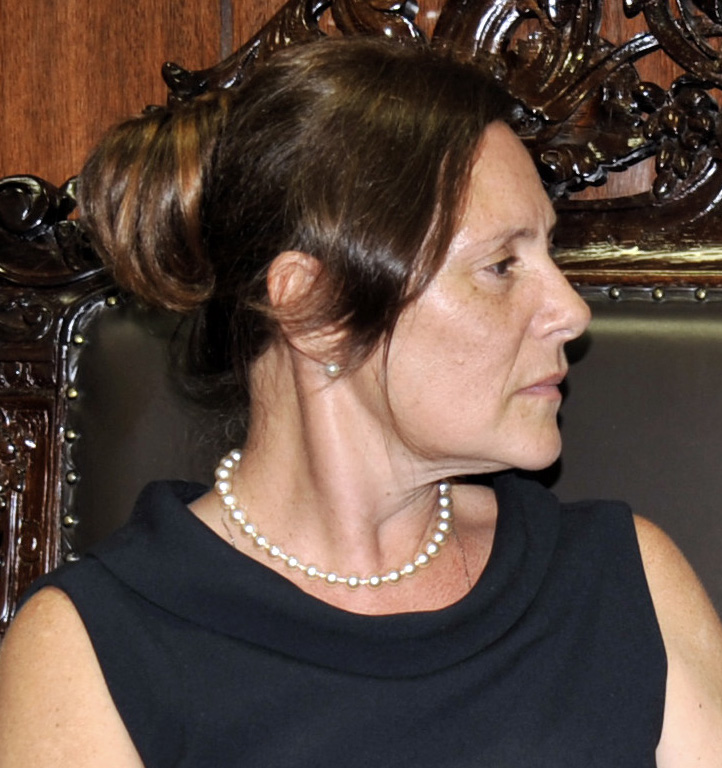
Elizabeth Savalla as Márcia

Actor	Character
Paolla Oliveira	Paloma Rodriguez Khoury Araújo
Malvino Salvador	Bruno dos Santos Araújo
Mateus Solano	Félix Rodriguez Khoury
Vanessa Giácomo	Aline Noronha Khoury
Susana Vieira	Pilar Rodriguez Khoury
Antônio Fagundes	César Khoury
Juliano Cazarré	Ninho (Joachim Roveri)
Elizabeth Savalla	Márcia do Espírito Santo (Tetê Para-Choque Para-Lama)
Thiago Fragoso	Niko (Nicolas Corona)
Marcello Antony	Eron Lira Torgano
Marina Ruy Barbosa	Nicole Veiga de Assis
Danielle Winits	Amarilys Baroni
Anderson Di Rizzi	Carlito (Carlos José dos Santos Araújo)
Eliane Giardini	Ordália Aparecida dos Santos Araújo
José Wilker	Herbert Marques
Luís Mello	Atílio Pimenta Camargo / Alfredo Gentil
Ary Fontoura	Lutero Moura Cardoso
Márcio Garcia	Gustavo Donato (Guto)
Lucas Romano	Luciano dos Santos Araújo
Neusa Maria Faro	Ciça (Maria Cecília Esteves)
Tatá Werneck	Valdirene do Espírito Santo
Klara Castanho	Paulinha (Paula Sousa Araújo)
Rosamaria Murtinho	Tamara Gouveia Sobral
Bárbara Paz	Edith Sobral Khoury
Caio Castro	Michel Gusmão
Maria Casadeval	Patrícia Mileto Donato
Carol Castro	Sílvia Bueno Gusmão
Nathalia Timberg	Bernarda Campos Rodriguez
Christiane Tricerri	Vega Azevedo Pimenta Camargo
Françoise Forton	Gigi (Gisela Borba de Andrada Lemos)
Carolina Kasting	Gina (Regina Maria dos Santos Batista)
Rodrigo Andrade	Daniel Melo Rodriguez
Fernanda Machado	Leila Melo Rodriguez
Ricardo Tozzi	Thales Brito
Bruna Linzmeyer	Linda Melo Rodriguez
Rainer Cadete	Rafael Nero
Fabiana Karla	Perséfone Fortino
Bel Kutner	Joana Rangel
Paula Braun	Rebeca Schatman
Mouhamed Harfouch	Pérsio Faruq Ahmad Khoury
Kiko Pissolato	Maciel Pereira / Wilson
Júlio Rocha	Jacques Sampaio
Leona Cavalli	Glauce de Sá Benites
Maria Maya	Alejandra Reys Moreno
Thalles Cabral	Jonathan Sobral Khoury
Fúlvio Stefanini	Denizard Trajano Araújo
Angela Rebello	Lídia Pinheiro
Sophia Abrahão	Natasha Schmidt / Natasha Veiga de Assis
Daniel Rocha	Rogério Machado
Sandra Corveloni	Neide Melo Rodriguez
Genézio de Barros	Amadeu Campos Rodriguez
Vera Zimmermann	Simone Maia Benitez
Emílio Orciollo Netto	Murilo de Andrada Lemos Corrêa
Thavyne Ferrari	Sandra Alves Corrêa (Sandrinha)
Cristina Mutarelli	Priscila Khoury
Lúcia Veríssimo	Mariah Plattini
Álamo Facó	Renan de Oliveira
Renata Castro Barbosa	Marilda Fernandes
Marcelo Schmidt	Valentin Reys Moreno
Ângela Dip	Vivian Lobato
Marcelo Argenta	Vanderlei Brandão
Josie Antello	Adriana Nascimento
Raquel Villar	Inaiá Seixas
Camila Chiba	Noriko Akiyoshi
Carol Rainato	Raquel Gonçalves
Gabriel Chadan	Adoniran Lobo
Pierre Baitelli	Laerte Torres
Felipe Titto	Wagner Carvalho
Vera Mancini	Maristela Freitas
Míriam Lins	Verônica Rocha
Marcelo Flores	Rinaldo Silva
Ângela Rabelo	Eudóxia
Carlos Machado	Ignácio
Lucas Malvacini	Anjinho
João Cunha	Jonas
Kayky Gonzaga	Jayme

=== Special appearances ===
- Neymar
- Alexandre Pato
- Luciano Huck
- Gustavo Borges
- Gusttavo Lima
- Vitor Belfort
- Valesca Popozuda
- Anitta
- Rita Cadillac

=== New characters ===
- As some had to leave the plot, other players have entered unusually in it the Walcyr Carrasco invitation. This was the case of Carol Castro, who entered the plot on July 5, in the Sílvia's skin, which was to be just a cameo that form a love triangle between the protagonists. However, the character ended up staying in the plot with another function, to interfere in the relationship of Patricia and Michel, as it turns out to be the doctor's wife. Throughout the novel also discovers that her character has to remove a breast, generating over a controversial subject in the plot, breast cancer. Already Márcio Garcia, who attended the first chapters as the adulterous husband of Patricia, returned in the middle of the novel to also separate his ex-fiancée of Michel.
- Carlos Machado entered the plot on 7 August as the millionaire Ignácio. It would just be a cameo, but the character returned to stay until the end of the plot, with your mother Eudóxia, played by Angela Rabelo.
- Another that comes in the middle of the plot is José Wilker, playing the doctor Herbert Marques, César's replacement in the position of clinical director of the hospital San Magno. The character is also a former case with Ordália, and alleged biological father of Gina. The premiere of the actor in the plot happened in the chapter on 26 September 2013. That was the last role of the actor, who died on April 4, 2014.
- Sophia Abrahão entered in the plot in October 2 as Natasha, daughter of Lídia (Angela Rebello) with Nicole's father (Marina Ruy Barbosa), who lived hidden abroad. She will be part of Lídia (Angela Rebello) and Rogério plan (Daniel Rocha), which begins to be put in place after the girl back to the doctor in the United States, to get back at Leila (Fernanda Machado) and Thales (Ricardo Tozzi) for what they did with Nicole (Marina Ruy Barbosa).
- Sidney Sampaio, who was already cast in the predecessor Salve Jorge, just mending work to get in the middle of Amor à Vida plot as the evangelical Elias, who makes romantic couple with Gina (Carolina Kasting). The actor entered the plot in the chapter 7 November 2013.
- Francisco Cuoco also entered in the last weeks of the novel as the farmer Rubão, husband of Eudóxia and father of Ignácio. The first scenes of the actor aired on January 3, 2014.

== Soundtracks ==
National

Cover: Paolla Oliveira

No.	Title	Music	Characters or locations	Length
1.	"Piradinha"	Gabriel Valim	Valdirene	2:47
2.	"Pontes Indestrutíveis"	Charlie Brown Jr.	Ninho	3:30
3.	"As Mina Pira na Balada"	Gusttavo Lima		2:47
4.	"Meiga e Abusada"	Anitta	Leila	3:51
5.	"As Curvas da Estrada de Santos"	Lulu Santos & Késia Estácio	Márcia and Gentil	5:42
6.	"Trem das Onze"	Zeca Pagodinho & Rildo Hora, Zé Menezes e Rogério Caetano	Ordália and Denizard	2:58
7.	"O Amor em Paz"	Ivete Sangalo	Pilar	3:10
8.	"Um Ser Amor"	Paula Fernandes	Bruno and Paloma	4:23
9.	"Fofinha Delícia"	Sorriso Maroto	Perséfone	2:52
10.	"Amor, Amor"	Wanessa	Patrícia and Michel	2:59
11.	"Combustível"	Ana Carolina	César and Aline	3:42
12.	"Você Não Poderia Surgir Agora"	Roberta Sá	General romance	4:19
13.	"Caio no Suingue"	Pedro Luis e a Parede	Location: Hospital theme	3:33
14.	"Na Selva de Pedra"	Conexão Baixada	Location: São Paulo	4:09
15.	"Maravida"	Daniel	Opening theme	3:52
16.	"Amor à Vida"	Nando Reis	General	3:38
17.	"Dançando na Garoa"	Jammil	Location: Hospital	3:22
18.	"Sambas Urbanos"	Rodrigo Pita	Location: São Paulo	4:05
19.	"Love You in Those Jeans"	P9	Valdirene	4:13

International

Cover: Mateus Solano

No.	Title	Lyrics	Music	Characters or locations	Length
1.	"When I Was Your Man"		Bruno Mars	Bruno e Paloma	3:58
2.	"Just Give Me a Reason"		Pink feat. Nate Ruess	Márcia e Gentil	4:05
3.	"Proud"		Heather Small	Niko and Félix	3:53
4.	"Brand New Me"		Alicia Keys	Patrícia and Michel	4:42
5.	"Get Lucky"		Daft Punk feat. Pharrell	Location: Hospital	4:09
6.	"Up in the Air"	Carol Rainato; Raquel Gonçalves	Thirty Seconds to Mars	Locação: Bar dos Médicos	4:44
7.	"We Can't Stop"		Miley Cyrus	General theme song sometimes used for closing credits	3:54
8.	"Busy (For Me)"		Aurea	Perséfone e Daniel	4:20
9.	"The Stars (Are out Tonight)"		David Bowie	Locação:São Paulo	3:57
10.	"It's Over"		Rod Stewart	Pilar e Maciel	4:22
11.	"Bad"		Groovy Waters	Félix	3:42
12.	"Wake Up and Love Me"		Casey Thompson	Valdirene and Carlito	3:47
13.	"Un Vestido y Un Amor"		Caetano Veloso	Ninho and Paloma	4:33
14.	"Ci Sono Pensier"		Mariella Nava	Ordália and Herbert theme song	4:49
15.	"Summertime Sadness"		Lana Del Rey	Félix and Edith theme song

== Ratings ==
Timeslot	# Eps.	Premiere		Finale		Rank	Season	Average viewership
Timeslot	# Eps.	Date	Viewers (in points)	Date	Viewers (in points)	Rank	Season	Average viewership
Monday—Saturday; 9:10 pm	221	20 May 2013	35	31 January 2014	48	#1	2013–14	36

In the premiere episode, Amor à Vida received a viewership rating of 35 points which is equivalent to 2.16 million households. In Florianópolis, it was estimated that about 3,5 million viewers have watched the pilot of the novel, with 67% audience share, recording 42.02 points in IBOPE. In its first week, the show garnered an average viewership of 34.2 points compared to its predecessor, Salve Jorge which had 32.7 points at (then) the same period. On the episode aired on 11 July 2013, the show registered 39 points breaking record for Walcyr Carrasco's novelas. On the episode aired on 1 August, Amor à Vida recorded 39 points taking into account that its one of the most controversial episodes where Edith (Barbara Paz) reveals to the Khoury's about Felix (Mateus Solano) sexuality. On the 8 August, the episode that had the wedding and death of Nicole (Marina Ruy Barbosa), the telenovela recorded a rating of 44 points in Rio de Janeiro and 38 points in São Paulo according to IBOPE. On the great revelation that Félix (Mateus Solano) abandoned Paloma's (Paolla Oliveira) daughter in a trash bin peaked at 45 points in Greater São Paulo. It became the most watched program of Brazilian television in the 2013–14 season. In the chapter on 27 January 2014, which recorded 49.4 points in the National IBOPE, which equates to 10.7 million homes and approximately 31.6 million viewers. In the ultimate episodes Amor à Vida registered 47 points in Greater São Paulo on 28 January, 42 points on 29 January. On its penultimate episode, Amor à Vida recorded 48 points with IBOPE, comparing it to Avenida Brasil which registered 49 points. In the last episode aired on 31 January 2014, the telenovela registered a viewership rating of 48 points.

== Awards and nominations ==
Year	Award	Category	Nominated	Result	Ref(s)
2013	Meus Prêmios Nick	Favorite Actress	Tatá Werneck	Nominated	
2013	Meus Prêmios Nick	Favorite Actor	Mateus Solano	Won	
2013	Meus Prêmios Nick	Favorite Character	Valdirene (Tatá Werneck)	Nominated	
2013	Prêmio Extra de Televisão	Best Telenovela	Walcyr Carrasco	Won	
2013	Prêmio Extra de Televisão	Best Lead Actress	Paolla Oliveira	Nominated	
2013	Prêmio Extra de Televisão	Best Lead Actress	Susana Vieira	Nominated	
2013	Prêmio Extra de Televisão	Best Lead Actor	Antonio Fagundes	Nominated	
2013	Prêmio Extra de Televisão	Best Lead Actor	Malvino Salvador	Nominated	
2013	Prêmio Extra de Televisão	Best Lead Actor	Mateus Solano	Won	
2013	Prêmio Extra de Televisão	Best Supporting Actress	Elizabeth Savalla	Won	
2013	Prêmio Extra de Televisão	Best Supporting Actress	Fernanda Machado	Nominated	
2013	Prêmio Extra de Televisão	Best Supporting Actress	Vanessa Giácomo	Nominated	
2013	Prêmio Extra de Televisão	Best Supporting Actor	Anderson Di Rizzi	Nominated	
2013	Prêmio Extra de Televisão	Best Supporting Actor	Luis Mello	Nominated	
2013	Prêmio Extra de Televisão	Best Female Revelation	Maria Casadevall	Nominated	
2013	Prêmio Extra de Televisão	Best Female Revelation	Tatá Werneck	Won	
2013	Prêmio Extra de Televisão	Best Child Performance	Klara Castanho	Won	
2013	Prêmio Extra de Televisão	Best Musical Theme	"Maravida" – (Daniel)	Nominated	
2013	Prêmio Extra de Televisão	Best Musical Theme	"Meiga e abusada" – (Anitta)	Nominated	
2013	Prêmio Extra de Televisão	Best Musical Theme	"Piradinha" – (Gabriel Valim)	Nominated	
2013	Prêmio Extra de Televisão	Ídol teen	Caio Castro	Won	
2013	Capricho Awards	Best Actress	Tatá Werneck	Won	
2013	Capricho Awards	Best Actress	Maria Casadevall	Nominated	
2013	Capricho Awards	Best Actress	Marina Ruy Barbosa	Nominated	
2013	Capricho Awards	Best Actor	Caio Castro	Won	
2013	Capricho Awards	Best Kiss	Caio Castro and Maria Casadevall	Nominated	
2013	Prêmio Jovem Brasileiro	Best Actor	Caio Castro	Won	
2013	Prêmio Jovem Brasileiro	Best Actress	Marina Ruy Barbosa	Nominated	
2013	Troféu APCA	Best Actor	Mateus Solano	Won	
2013	Troféu APCA	Best Actress	Elizabeth Savalla	Won	
2013	Troféu APCA	Best Actress	Tatá Werneck	Nominated	
2013	Retrospectiva UOL	Best Telenovela	Walcyr Carrasco	Nominated	
2013	Retrospectiva UOL	Best Actress	Susana Vieira	Nominated	
2013	Retrospectiva UOL	Best Actor	Mateus Solano	Won	
2013	Retrospectiva UOL	Best Villain	Vanessa Giácomo	Nominated	
2013	Retrospectiva UOL	Best Villain	Mateus Solano	Won	
2013	Retrospectiva UOL	Best Couple	Tatá Werneck and Anderson Di Rizzi	Nominated	
2013	Retrospectiva UOL	Best Couple	Paolla Oliveira and Malvino Salvador	Nominated	
2013	Retrospectiva UOL	Best Couple	Caio Castro and Maria Casadevall	Nominated	
2013	Retrospectiva UOL	Best Couple	Marina Ruy Barbosa and Ricardo Tozzi	Nominated	
2013	Retrospectiva UOL	Best Male/Female Revelation	Maria Casadevall	Nominated	
2013	Retrospectiva UOL	Best Male/Female Revelation	Tatá Werneck	Won	
2013	Prêmio Quem de Televisão	Best Actor	Antonio Fagundes	Nominated	
2013	Prêmio Quem de Televisão	Best Actor	Mateus Solano	Won	
2013	Prêmio Quem de Televisão	Best Actress	Susana Vieira	Nominated	
2013	Prêmio Quem de Televisão	Best Supporting Actor	Anderson Di Rizzi	Nominated	
2013	Prêmio Quem de Televisão	Best Supporting Actor	Luís Mello	Nominated	
2013	Prêmio Quem de Televisão	Best Supporting Actress	Bárbara Paz	Nominated	
2013	Prêmio Quem de Televisão	Best Supporting Actress	Elizabeth Savalla	Won	
2013	Prêmio Quem de Televisão	Best Supporting Actress	Danielle Winits	Nominated	
2013	Prêmio Quem de Televisão	Best Supporting Actress	Nathalia Timberg	Nominated	
2013	Prêmio Quem de Televisão	Revelation	Felipe Titto	Nominated	
2013	Prêmio Quem de Televisão	Revelation	Maria Casadevall	Nominated	
2013	Prêmio Quem de Televisão	Revelation	Tatá Werneck	Won	
2013	Prêmio Quem de Televisão	Best Author	Walcyr Carrasco	Won	
2013	Melhores do Ano	Best Actress	Paolla Oliveira	Won	
2013	Melhores do Ano	Best Actress	Susana Vieira	Nominated	
2013	Melhores do Ano	Best Actress	Vanessa Giácomo	Nominated	
2013	Melhores do Ano	Best Actor	Antônio Fagundes	Nominated	
2013	Melhores do Ano	Best Actor	Mateus Solano	Won	
2013	Melhores do Ano	Best Supporting Actress	Elizabeth Savalla	Won	
2013	Melhores do Ano	Best Supporting Actress	Fabiana Karla	Nominated	
2013	Melhores do Ano	Best Supporting Actor	Caio Castro	Nominated	
2013	Melhores do Ano	Best Supporting Actor	Juliano Cazarré	Nominated	
2013	Melhores do Ano	Best Supporting Actor	Thiago Fragoso	Won	
2013	Melhores do Ano	Best Female Revelation	Maria Casadevall	Nominated	
2013	Melhores do Ano	Best Female Revelation	Tatá Werneck	Won	
2013	Melhores do Ano	Best Male Revelation	Anderson Di Rizzi	Won	
2013	Melhores do Ano	Best Child Performance	Klara Castanho	Nominated	
2014
2014	Shorty Awards	Actress	Sophia Abrahão	Nominated	
2014	Troféu Imprensa	Best Telenovela	Walcyr Carrasco	Won	
2014	Troféu Imprensa	Best Actor	Caio Castro	Nominated	
2014	Troféu Imprensa	Best Actor	Mateus Solano	Won	
2014	Troféu Imprensa	Best Actress	Elizabeth Savalla	Nominated	
2014	Troféu Imprensa	Best Actress	Vanessa Giácomo	Won	
2014	Troféu Imprensa	Revelation	Tatá Werneck	Won	
2014	Troféu Internet	Best Telenovela	Walcyr Carrasco	Won	
2014	Troféu Internet	Best Actor	Antonio Fagundes	Nominated	
2014	Troféu Internet	Best Actor	Caio Castro	Nominated	
2014	Troféu Internet	Best Actor	Malvino Salvador	Nominated	
2014	Troféu Internet	Best Actor	Mateus Solano	Won	
2014	Troféu Internet	Best Actress	Elizabeth Savalla	Nominated	
2014	Troféu Internet	Best Actress	Paolla Oliveira	Nominated	
2014	Troféu Internet	Best Actress	Susana Vieira	Nominated	
2014	Troféu Internet	Best Actress	Vanessa Giácomo	Nominated	
2014	Troféu Internet	Revelation	Maria Casadevall	Nominated	
2014	Troféu Internet	Revelation	Tatá Werneck	Won	
2014	Prêmio Contigo! de TV	Best Telenovela of the Year	Walcyr Carrasco	Won	
2014	Prêmio Contigo! de TV	Best Actor	Antônio Fagundes	Nominated	
2014	Prêmio Contigo! de TV	Best Actor	Mateus Solano	Won	
2014	Prêmio Contigo! de TV	Best Actress	Paolla Oliveira	Nominated	
2014	Prêmio Contigo! de TV	Best Actress	Vanessa Giácomo	Won	
2014	Prêmio Contigo! de TV	Best Supporting Actor	Anderson Di Rizzi	Nominated	
2014	Prêmio Contigo! de TV	Best Supporting Actor	Thiago Fragoso	Won	
2014	Prêmio Contigo! de TV	Best Supporting Actress	Bruna Linzmeyer	Nominated	
2014	Prêmio Contigo! de TV	Best Supporting Actress	Elizabeth Savalla	Won	
2014	Prêmio Contigo! de TV	Revelation of TV	Maria Casadevall	Nominated	
2014	Prêmio Contigo! de TV	Revelation of TV	Tatá Werneck	Won	
2014	Prêmio Contigo! de TV	Best Child Actress	Klara Castanho	Nominated	
2014	Prêmio Contigo! de TV	Best Author	Walcyr Carrasco	Nominated	
2014	Prêmio Contigo! de TV	Best Director	Wolf Maya and Mauro Mendonça Filho	Nominated	
2016	GLAAD Media Awards	Outstanding Novela	Walcyr Carrasco	Won	
