= Malvino Salvador =

Brazilian actor and model

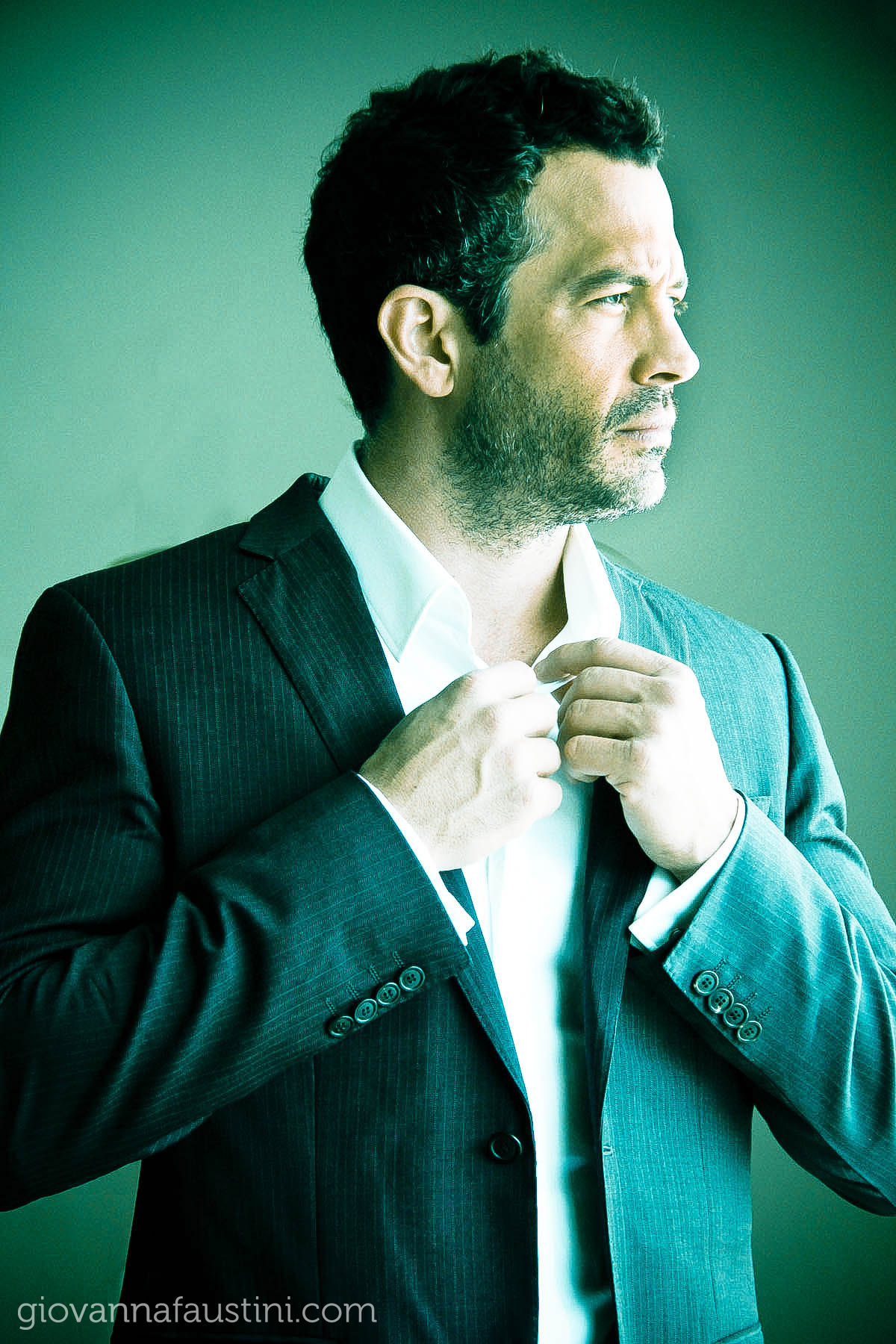
- Salvador in 2011
- Born: Malvino Ramos Salvador; January 31, 1976 (age 49); Manaus, Amazonas, Brazil
- Occupations: Actor; model
- Years active: 2004–present
- Height: 1.80 m (5 ft 11 in)
- Partner: Kyra Gracie (2013–present)

Malvino Ramos Salvador (born January 31, 1976) is a Brazilian actor and model.

== Biography ==
Malvino Salvador was born in Manaus, Amazonas, where he lived until he was 25 years old. He is of Portuguese descent. In Manaus, he was a bank clerk and studied accounting sciences at the Federal University of Amazonas. After participating in parades, for fun, Salvador was invited to move from Manaus to São Paulo, where he worked as a model in advertising campaigns and invest in his acting career. Salvador was acted by Carlos Alexandre Oliveira Correa, who integrated him in the casting of the agency of models Duomo, going next to the agencies BRM Models and L'equipe.

== Career ==
His first role in a Novela (Latin American Soap Opera), Cabocla he played Tobias, one of the main antagonists. Soon after Cabocla, Salvador starred Alma Gêmea, the role of chef Vitório. In O Profeta, the actor again played one of the main antagonists, Camilo who ended up being murdered and his death was a major mystery in the plot. In the novela Sete Pecados he played Regis, a character who was always running away from marriage and commitment. His first protagonist was Gabriel in Caras & Bocas.

In 2011 starred in Fina Estampa, as a protagonist of the children of Griselda. Quinzé was the brother of Antenor and Amalia, played by Sophie Charlotte. Salvador stars as Bruno in the 2013 Rede Globo telenovela Amor à Vida.

== Personal life ==
Salvador is the father of a girl named Sofia, born in 2009. The child is the result of a relationship with Ana Ceolin.

He also has two daughters and one son with famed jiu-jitsu fighter Kyra Gracie.

== Filmography ==
=== Television ===
Year	Title	Role	Notes
2004	Cabocla	Tobias de Oliveira Pinto	TV Debut
2005	Alma Gêmea	Vitório Santini	
2006	O Profeta	Camilo de Oliveira	Antagonist
2007	Sete Pecados	Régis Florentino	
2008	Faça Sua História	Haroldo	Episode: "Piloto"
2008–09	A Favorita	Damião Salvador	
2009	Caras & Bocas	Gabriel Batista da Silva	Main role
2011–12	Fina Estampa	Joaquim José da Silva Pereira (Quinzé)	
2011	Amor em Quatro Atos	Antônio	Episode: "Ela Faz Cinema"
2012	Guerra dos Sexos	Rodrigo Ramirez	Guest role
2012	As Brasileiras	Sinvaldo Modesto	Episode: "A Sambista da BR-116"
2013–14	Amor à Vida	Bruno dos Santos Araújo	Main role
2016	Haja Coração	Apolo	
2017	Sol Nascente	Cristiano Dantas	Guest role
2017	Os Trapalhões	Didico's super-ego	
2018	Orgulho e Paixão	Colonel Brandão	
2019	A Dona do Pedaço	Agno Fernandes	

=== Film ===
Year	Title	Role
2005	Night of Joy	Himself
2007	The Sign of the City	Gil
2011	Qualquer Gato Vira-Lata	Conrado
2015	Qualquer Gato Vira-Lata 2	Conrado

== Theater ==
Year	Title
2003	Blue Jeans
2005	Paixão de Cristo de Nova Jerusalém
2010	Paixão de Cristo
2010	Mente Mentira
2014–15	Chuva Constante

== Awards and nominations ==
Year	Award	Category	Work	Result
2004	Melhores do Ano	Best Revelation Actor	Cabocla	Nominated
2013	Prêmio Extra de Televisão	Best Actor	Amor à Vida	Nominated
2014	Troféu Internet	Best Actor	Amor à Vida	Nominated
2017	Troféu Imprensa	Best Telenovela Actor	Haja Coração	Nominated
2017	Troféu Internet	Best Telenovela Actor	Haja Coração	Nominated
