= List of Love Is Blind: Brazil episodes =

The following is a list of episodes from Love Is Blind: Brazil, a Brazilian dating reality television programme produced by Endemol Shine Brasil that first aired on Netflix in October 2021.

== Series overview ==
Series	Episodes	Originally released	
Series	Episodes	First released	Last released
1	11	6 October 2021	4 November 2021
2	11	28 December 2022	1 February 2023
3	11	7 June 2023	2 July 2023
4	11	19 June 2024	10 July 2024
5	13	10 September 2025	24 September 2025

== Episodes ==
=== Season 1 (2021) ===
No. overall	No. in season	Title	Original release date
Week 1
1	1	"Pod of Love"	October 6, 2021
2	2	"Yes, I Will!"	October 6, 2021
3	3	"Sexy Honeymoon"	October 6, 2021
4	4	"Better Together"	October 6, 2021
Week 2
5	5	"Expectation vs. Reality"	October 13, 2021
6	6	"Living Together"	October 13, 2021
7	7	"Where Do We Go from Here?"	October 13, 2021
8	8	"The Wedding Approaches"	October 13, 2021
Week 3
9	9	"Bachelor Party"	October 20, 2021
10	10	"Moment of Truth"	October 20, 2021
Special
11	11	"The Reunion"	November 4, 2021

=== Season 2 (2022) ===
No. overall	No. in season	Title	Original release date
Week 1
12	1	"Anyone There?"	December 28, 2022
13	2	"If We Work Together, Everyone Can Get Married"	December 28, 2022
14	3	"Junglemoon"	December 28, 2022
15	4	"So Was There Chemistry?"	December 28, 2022
Week 2
16	5	"Official Real Life"	January 4, 2023
17	6	"Reality Check"	January 4, 2023
18	7	"You've Never Eaten Feijoada?"	January 4, 2023
19	8	"Trial by Fire!"	January 4, 2023
Week 3
20	9	"Hit the Floor, Couples!"	January 11, 2023
21	10	"Is Love Blind After All?"	January 11, 2023
Special
22	11	"The Reunion"	February 1, 2023

=== Season 3 (2023) ===
No. overall	No. in season	Title	Original release date
Week 1
23	1	"I'm Getting Married!"	June 7, 2023
24	2	"A Thousand Times Yes"	June 7, 2023
25	3	"Who Didn't Howl?"	June 7, 2023
26	4	"Top Rest!"	June 7, 2023
Week 2
27	5	"Move On and Leave the Past Behind!"	June 14, 2023
28	6	"A Couple's Tattoo!"	June 14, 2023
29	7	"Trying On Dreams!"	June 14, 2023
30	8	"Players Fall in Love, Too!"	June 14, 2023
Week 3
31	9	"We're in It Together!"	June 21, 2023
32	10	"Did Love Win?"	June 21, 2023
Special
33	11	"The Live Reunion"	July 2, 2023

=== Season 4 (2024) ===
No. overall	No. in season	Title	Original release date
Week 1
34	1	"A Fresh Start on Love"	June 19, 2024
35	2	"To Those Who Thought They'd Never Love Again"	June 19, 2024
36	3	"Royal Honeymoon"	June 19, 2024
37	4	"Love After Retreat"	June 19, 2024
Week 2
38	5	"Let's See What Happens"	June 26, 2024
39	6	"Father of the Bride"	June 26, 2024
40	7	"No Bed of Roses"	June 26, 2024
41	8	"Fit for a Fitting"	June 26, 2024
Week 3
42	9	"Let's Get Married!"	July 4, 2023
43	10	"Is Love Blind After All?"	July 4, 2023
Special
44	11	"The Reunion"	July 10, 2023

=== Season 5 (2025) ===
No. overall	No. in season	Title	Original release date
Week 1
45	1	"It's Never Too Late for Love"	September 10, 2025
46	2	"Will You Join Me?"	September 10, 2025
47	3	"It Takes a Long Time to Become Young"	September 10, 2025
48	4	"Love Like in the Movies"	September 10, 2025
49	5	"Reactions: Never Too Late"	September 10, 2025
Week 2
50	6	"A Forever Honeymoon?"	September 17, 2025
51	7	"One Day at a Time"	September 17, 2025
52	8	"Go Easy on Me"	September 17, 2025
53	9	"Dress Rehearsal"	September 17, 2025
54	10	"Reactions: Living Together"	September 17, 2025
Week 3
55	11	"Farewell, Single Life!"	September 24, 2025
56	12	"Is Love Really Blind?"	September 24, 2025
57	13	"Reactions: Is Love Really Blind?"	September 24, 2025
