= 99 to Beat (disambiguation) =

99 to Beat is a Belgium game show. It may also refer to:

- 99 to Beat (American game show), an American variation of the show
- 99 to Beat (British game show), a British variation of the show
