= Agatha Moreira =

Brazilian actress and model (born 1992)

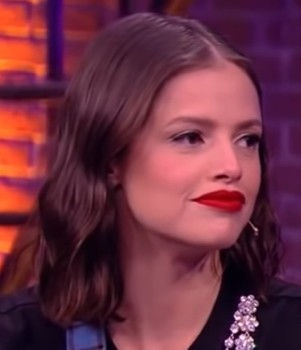
- Agatha Moreira on Lady Night in 2021
- Born: Agatha Cerqueira Pereira Moreira; January 19, 1992 (age 34); Rio de Janeiro, Brazil
- Occupations: Actress, model
- Years active: 2012–present (actress); 2006–present (model)
- Height: 1.74 m (5 ft 9 in)
- Relatives: Samara Felippo (cousin)
- Awards: List

Agatha Cerqueira Pereira Moreira (born January 19, 1992) is a Brazilian actress and former model. She became known after her participation in the twentieth season of the teen telenovela Malhação in 2012; before this, she worked as model in several countries where she did numerous advertising campaigns, appeared in magazine articles and was the face for various known brands. She starred in Em Família in 2014 and was recognized for her performance in Verdades Secretas in 2015. More recently she has starred in several other novelas, including her breakout role in A Dona do Pedaço, in 2019.

== Biography ==
Born in Rio de Janeiro, she was raised in the neighborhood of Olaria. She is the daughter of driver Enilda Cerqueira and retired businessman Antônio Moreira and her siblings are Cristiane Moreira and Augusto Cerqueira. Her parents separated when Agatha was 3 years old and she lived with her father, a family agreement, since he had better living conditions to raise the children at that time. She is the cousin of actress Samara Felippo, to whom she attributed the inspiration to also enter the world of acting.

== Career ==
In 2006, at the age of 14, she auditioned for models at the Brazilian headquarters of the international agency Elite Model Management, recommended by her aunt, Lea Felippo, mother of actress Samara Felippo. At the time, Agatha did not have a professional book, so she took improvised photos with her own camera to the auditions, which did not interfere with her being approved among the 20 models hired. In 2009, at the age of 17, she became an agent of 40º Graus Models and was sent to Chile, where she lived and modeled for designers from all over Latin America. During this time, she traveled to Japan, the Dominican Republic and Peru to do temporary work.

In 2010, she lived for six months in South Korea, where, in addition to her conventional work as a model, she also participated in the music video "Shut Up! (시끄러)" by the South Korean boy band U-KISS. In the same year, she spent another six months in Miami, United States. In 2011, she lived in New York, where she photographed for magazines such as Vogue and Stylist. At this time, Agatha planned to leave her modeling career to return to Brazil and study theater, embarking on a career in acting, but she needed to save up enough money to pay for her studies, working at the same time as a model and event promoter in her free time, earning the necessary amount to pay for her studies.

In 2012, back in Brazil, Agatha managed to take a theater course. At this time, she received an email recruiting her for a test at Rede Globo. However, without the money to go to Projac because she had given up her modeling career and was experiencing some financial difficulties, Agatha had to call to explain the situation and sent a homemade video containing the interpretive text they requested. Even without having attended in person, the young woman was approved as the protagonist of the twentieth season of Malhação, alongside Alice Wegmann, a soap opera in which her cousin had also gained notoriety thirteen years earlier – playing the dreamer Ju. In 2014, she played the spoiled brat Giselle in Em Família.

In 2015, she played her most well-known role to date, the spoiled villain Giovanna, in Verdades Secretas. She also participated in the twelfth season of the talent show Dança dos Famosos. In 2016, she played the spoiled rebel Camila in Haja Coração, a character who began with traits of antagonism, forming one of the main couples along with Jayme Matarazzo. In 2017, she played Domitila de Castro, Marchioness of Santos in Novo Mundo, a suffering young woman who becomes a seductive villain and lover of Dom Pedro I. In 2018, she played the sweet and romantic Ema Cavalcante in the six-night soap opera Orgulho e Paixão. In 2019, she played the great psychopathic villain Josiane in A Dona do Pedaço, an unscrupulous young social climber, rival of her own mother, the protagonist Maria da Paz (Juliana Paes). The biggest character of her career.

In 2021, she confirmed her participation in the continuation of the soap opera Verdades Secretas, with short blonde hair, returning to play Giovanna, who is determined to prove that Angel (Camila Queiroz) killed her father, businessman Alex (Rodrigo Lombardi), and hires a mysterious investigator involved in the fashion world, Cristiano (Rômulo Estrela), and ends up falling in love with the model. In 2022, she made a guest appearance in the premiere of the soap opera Cara e Coragem on TV Globo.

In 2023, she joined the cast of Terra e Paixão, playing Graça, an arrogant, snobbish and prejudiced model who will not accept losing her fiancé Daniel (Johnny Massaro) to a black, lower-class woman. With the help of her mother-in-law, she plans to stage a pregnancy scam in hopes of keeping her fiancé. This marks her fourth partnership with author Walcyr Carrasco, all as villains.

== Personal life ==
Between 2010 and 2012, she dated actor Pablo Morais for two years. At the time, the two worked together as models, eventually living together in New York. In 2013, she began dating filmmaker Pedro Nicoll, ending the relationship in April 2016. In October 2016, she began dating actor Pedro Lamin, with the relationship coming to an end in May 2018. During the recording of the soap opera Orgulho e Paixão, she began dating actor Rodrigo Simas, her romantic partner in the plot, which only became official in January 2019.

== Filmography ==
=== Television ===
Year	Title	Role	Notes	Ref.
2009	Viver a Vida	Circus artist	Episode: "December 14"	
2012–2013	Malhação	Juliana "Ju" Menezes	Protagonist	
2014	Em Família	Giselle Dutra Noronha Muniz	Recurring role	
2015–2021	Verdades Secretas	Giovanna Lovatelli Ticiano "Kika"	Recurring role	
2015	Dança dos Famosos	Herself	Season 12,(5th place)	
2016	Haja Coração	Camila Abdalla Varella	Co-lead role	
2017	Novo Mundo	Domitila de Castro, Marchioness of Santos	Recurring role	
2018	Orgulho e Paixão	Ema Cavalcante Pricelli	Co-lead role	
2019	A Dona do Pedaço	Josiane "Jô" Sobral Ramirez Matheus	Main Antagonist	
2022	Cara e Coragem	Herself	Episode: "May 30th"	
2023–2024	Terra e Paixão	Graça Junqueira	Antagonist	
2024–2025	Mania de Você	Luma Molina	Protagonist	
2026	Quem Ama Cuida	Ingrid Brandão	Recurring Role	

=== Film ===
Year	Title	Role	Notes	Ref.
2021	Missão Cupido	Death	Protagonist	
2021	Pixinguinha, Um Homem Carinhoso	Gaby	Main Cast	

=== Videography ===
Year	Title	Artist
2010	"Shut Up! (시끄러)"	U-KISS
2017	"Linda, Louca e Mimada"	Oriente
2018	"Keep on Lovin'"	Cat Dealers

== Awards and nominations ==
Year	Award	Category	Job	Result	Ref.
2015	Prêmio Jovem Brasileiro	Best Young Actress	Verdades Secretas	Won	
2015	Prêmio Extra de Televisão	Best Supporting Actress	Verdades Secretas	Nominated	
2015	Prêmio Quem de Televisão	Best Revelation	Verdades Secretas	Nominated	
2015	Melhores do Ano	Best New Actress	Verdades Secretas	Nominated	
2016	Troféu Internet	Revelation of the Year	Verdades Secretas	Nominated	
2019	Melhores do Ano	Best Supporting Actress	A Dona do Pedaço	Nominated	
2019	Prêmio Contigo! Online	Best Supporting Actress	A Dona do Pedaço	Nominated	
2019	Troféu UOL TV e Famosos	Best Actress	A Dona do Pedaço	Nominated	
2019	Prêmio Área VIP	Character of The Year	A Dona do Pedaço	Nominated	
2019	Prêmio Arcanjo de Cultura	Streaming TV	A Dona do Pedaço	Nominated	
2020	Troféu Internet	Best Actress	A Dona do Pedaço	Nominated	
2020	Prêmio Geração Glamour	Actress of The Year	A Dona do Pedaço	Won	
2020	Meus Prêmios Nick	Shipp of The Year	Agatha and Rodrigo Simas	Nominated	
2020	Prêmio F5	Couple of The Year	Agatha and Rodrigo Simas	Nominated	
2023	BreakTudo Awards	Best National Actress	Terra e Paixão	Nominated	
2024	Melhores do Ano	Telenovela Actress	Mania de Você	Nominated	
2024	Prêmio Área VIP	Best Actress	Mania de Você	Nominated	
2025	Troféu Internet	Best Actress	Mania de Você	Nominated	
