= List of Verdades Secretas episodes =

Verdades Secretas is a Brazilian telenovela created by Walcyr Carrasco and directed by Mauro Mendonça Filho and Amora Mautner. It premiered on TV Globo on 8 June 2015. The telenovela focuses on Arlete, a beautiful young girl full of dreams who arrives in São Paulo willing to become a model, but ends up working as a luxury prostitute under the stage name "Angel".

In 2020, the telenovela was renewed for a second season, which premiered on Globoplay on 20 October 2021. As of 17 December 2021, 114 episodes of Verdades Secretas have aired, concluding the second season.

== Series overview ==
Season	Episodes	Originally released		
Season	Episodes	First released	Last released	Network
1	64	8 June 2015	25 September 2015	TV Globo
2	50	20 October 2021	17 December 2021	Globoplay

== Episodes ==
=== Season 1 (2015) ===
No. overall	No. in season	Title	Original release date	Brazil viewers (Rating points)
1	1	"Episode 1"	8 June 2015	22.9
Arlete, a beaultiful girl from an inner town, talks to her parents, Carolina and Rogério, about her dream of becoming a model. Carolina learns that Rogério has another family and decides to move with Arlete to her mother Hilda's house in São Paulo. Alex, a powerful, rich man, is interested in Fanny's young models from her agency, and asks Robério, his right-hand man, to arrange a meeting with her. Hilda receives Carolina and Arlete, and introduces them to her friend Darlene. Hilda gets Arlete a scholarship to a traditional high school. At the school, Alex's daughter Giovanna rejects Arlete, but Guilherme and Eziel treat her sympathetically. Carolina takes Arlete to the modeling agency. Visky, the agency's booker, convinces Fanny to invest in Arlete's career, who then stage names her "Angel".
2	2	"Episode 2"	9 June 2015	20.2
Angel approves her stage name. Hilda confesses to Carolina that she has a large debt over the house bills, and Angel overhears the conversation. Fanny tells her affair Anthony that Angel will earn her a lot of money. Guilherme asks Giovanna to invite Angel to her party. Angel does a photoshoot for her modeling book. Carolina gets a job at a doctor's office. Darlene convinces Carolina to allow Angel to attend Giovanna's party. Guilherme seduces Angel and the two of them stay together at the party.
3	3	"Episode 3"	11 June 2015	19.2
Angel gets involved with Guilherme, who seems distant. Carolina is mad at Angel for coming home late. Fanny tells Alex that he will approve Angel as the new model for his brand. Hilda is upset to see Carolina cleaning her father's gun. Angel does her first modeling event. Fanny reveals to Angel how the "pink book" works. During a dinner with Ming, Angel thinks about Guilherme and leaves the meeting with a businessman.
4	4	"Episode 4"	12 June 2015	20.2
Angel comments to Carolina that she does not know if she will continue her modeling career. Angel sees Guilherme with Bel and realizes that she has been used by him. Hilda receives a court summon for the late payment of her bills and becomes ill. Angel looks for Fanny, who is very angry with her. Angel tells Fanny that she wants to participate in the pink book scheme and agrees to do the "Like" brand fashion show. Visky talks to Angel about how the fashion world actually works. Fanny shows a photo of Angel to Alex.
5	5	"Episode 5"	15 June 2015	22.4
6	6	"Episode 6"	16 June 2015	17.9
7	7	"Episode 7"	18 June 2015	16.1
8	8	"Episode 8"	19 June 2015	18.2
9	9	"Episode 9"	22 June 2015	24.0
10	10	"Episode 10"	23 June 2015	15.4
11	11	"Episode 11"	25 June 2015	15.2
12	12	"Episode 12"	26 June 2015	16.2
13	13	"Episode 13"	29 June 2015	23.9
14	14	"Episode 14"	30 June 2015	16.8
15	15	"Episode 15"	2 July 2015	15.2
16	16	"Episode 16"	3 July 2015	18.9
17	17	"Episode 17"	6 July 2015	25.5
18	18	"Episode 18"	7 July 2015	16.7
19	19	"Episode 19"	9 July 2015	15.7
20	20	"Episode 20"	10 July 2015	15.6
21	21	"Episode 21"	13 July 2015	22.9
22	22	"Episode 22"	14 July 2015	17.8
23	23	"Episode 23"	16 July 2015	16.1
24	24	"Episode 24"	17 July 2015	16.0
25	25	"Episode 25"	20 July 2015	23.7
26	26	"Episode 26"	21 July 2015	16.5
27	27	"Episode 27"	23 July 2015	16.7
28	28	"Episode 28"	24 July 2015	18.5
29	29	"Episode 29"	27 July 2015	25.0
30	30	"Episode 30"	28 July 2015	17.7
31	31	"Episode 31"	30 July 2015	17.0
32	32	"Episode 32"	31 July 2015	18.6
33	33	"Episode 33"	3 August 2015	24.5
34	34	"Episode 34"	4 August 2015	18.1
35	35	"Episode 35"	6 August 2015	18.3
36	36	"Episode 36"	7 August 2015	17.8
37	37	"Episode 37"	10 August 2015	26.5
38	38	"Episode 38"	11 August 2015	18.2
39	39	"Episode 39"	13 August 2015	18.3
40	40	"Episode 40"	14 August 2015	19.0
41	41	"Episode 41"	17 August 2015	25.3
42	42	"Episode 42"	18 August 2015	18.8
43	43	"Episode 43"	20 August 2015	17.2
44	44	"Episode 44"	21 August 2015	18.5
45	45	"Episode 45"	24 August 2015	25.7
46	46	"Episode 46"	25 August 2015	18.1
47	47	"Episode 47"	27 August 2015	18.7
48	48	"Episode 48"	28 August 2015	19.9
49	49	"Episode 49"	31 August 2015	25.7
50	50	"Episode 50"	1 September 2015	15.9
51	51	"Episode 51"	3 September 2015	18.8
52	52	"Episode 52"	4 September 2015	20.2
53	53	"Episode 53"	7 September 2015	24.1
54	54	"Episode 54"	8 September 2015	15.7
55	55	"Episode 55"	10 September 2015	19.6
56	56	"Episode 56"	11 September 2015	19.6
57	57	"Episode 57"	14 September 2015	25.4
58	58	"Episode 58"	15 September 2015	18.4
59	59	"Episode 59"	17 September 2015	21.4
60	60	"Episode 60"	18 September 2015	19.2
61	61	"Episode 61"	21 September 2015	26.6
62	62	"Episode 62"	22 September 2015	20.7
63	63	"Episode 63"	24 September 2015	24.3
64	64	"Episode 64"	25 September 2015	26.5

=== Season 2 (2021) ===
No. overall	No. in season	Title	Original release date
65	1	"Episode 1"	20 October 2021
Angel becomes a widow after Guilherme's death. Giovanna shows up at Angel's house and confronts her about Alex's death. In debt and with a son left to raise, Angel returns to the modeling agency.
66	2	"Episode 2"	20 October 2021
Giovanna and Cristiano hatch a plan to get Angel to confess to her crime. Araídes searches for Lara at the boarding school, from which she gets expelled for nonpayment. Angel and Cristiano work at the fashion show together.
67	3	"Episode 3"	20 October 2021
After modeling together, Cristiano meets Angel and tries to get closer to her. Percy is charmed by Angel, who agrees to have dinner with him in order to get money for her son Fabrício's exams.
68	4	"Episode 4"	20 October 2021
Angel sleeps with Percy and secures the money to pay for Fabrício's exams. Blanche asks Ariel out on a date. The agency models go to Percy and Ariel's nightclub.
69	5	"Episode 5"	20 October 2021
Giovanna catches Cristiano and Angel together at the club. Lara tells Araídes that she wants to be a model like Angel. Blanche learns about Visky and Ariel's arrangement to bring models to the nightclub.
70	6	"Episode 6"	20 October 2021
Ariel hides from Laila that he has slept with Blanche. Cristiano confesses to Giovanna that he has been involved with Angel. Blanche accepts Laila at the agency and tells her that she needs to lose weight.
71	7	"Episode 7"	20 October 2021
Cristiano pressures Angel to tell the truth about Alex's death. Angel learns that Fabrício has a serious illness. Laila begins to feel the effects of the medication.
72	8	"Episode 8"	20 October 2021
Cristiano gathers one more piece of evidence to believe that Angel is guilty for Alex's death. Fabrício begins the treatment against his disease.
73	9	"Episode 9"	20 October 2021
Ariel learns that Blanche has given Laila medications to lose weight. Visky becomes suspicious of Cristiano. Giovanna learns that Cristiano has destroyed evidence from the investigation in order to protect Angel.
74	10	"Episode 10"	20 October 2021
Visky goes after Cristiano in order to find out who he actually is. Tânia spies on Giovanna. Blanche makes a deal with Lúcio and gets his help in order to fool Ariel.
75	11	"Episode 11"	3 November 2021
Now aware that Cristiano is an investigator, Angel is surprised by a marriage proposal from him. Joseph is offended by Blanche's attitude. Cristiano spots Angel's meeting with Percy.
76	12	"Episode 12"	3 November 2021
Angel and Percy spend the night together. Cristiano asks Giovanna to resume the investigation. Betty gathers the models at the studio to organize the mall show.
77	13	"Episode 13"	3 November 2021
Cristiano pressures the police deputy to reopen the investigation about Alex's death, and tells Giovanna that he has obtained evidence that could incriminate Angel.
78	14	"Episode 14"	3 November 2021
Cristiano, Edney, and Eurípedes go after a witness who can have evidence that could incriminate Angel. Giotto catches Betty with Matheus. Giovanna and Cristiano set Benji up at the nightclub.
79	15	"Episode 15"	3 November 2021
Araídes takes the blame for Nicolau's death in order to get Lara free. Under the effects of medication, Laila has a breakdown on the fashion show. Matheus parades for the first time.
80	16	"Episode 16"	3 November 2021
Lara visits Araídes at the hospital, who persuades her to become a model. Laila pretends to take medicine prescribed by her doctor. Benji pressures Bruno to take money from his family.
81	17	"Episode 17"	3 November 2021
Bruno is distraught to see that Benji has fallen through his apartment window and calls Giovanna for help. Giovanna advances the evidence against Angel. Lara says goodbye to her mother and leaves to São Paulo.
82	18	"Episode 18"	3 November 2021
Cristiano seduces Angel and the two of them sleep together. While Angel sleeps, Cristiano takes strands from her hair brush. Laila is taken to the hospital and Ariel questions Blanche about the medication.
83	19	"Episode 19"	3 November 2021
Angel tells Percy that she feels bad about his way of loving her. Bruno blackmails his sister and is hospitalized. Cristiano says he has evidence to put Angel in jail.
84	20	"Episode 20"	3 November 2021
Angel seeks out Cristiano and asks him to drop the investigation. Lara tries to get to the modeling agency and talk to Visky. Ariel takes Laila to the psychiatrist.
85	21	"Episode 21"	17 November 2021
In jail, Angel receives a visit from Giovanna, who pressures her to confess her crime. Cristiano has a conscience crisis. At the agency, Visky confronts Cristiano and introduces Lara to Blanche.
86	22	"Episode 22"	17 November 2021
Percy promises to help Angel in exchange for rewards and hires a lawyer to get her free. Lourdeca feels uneasy at the agency. Lua does her first photoshoot for her modeling book.
87	23	"Episode 23"	17 November 2021
Angel is surprised by Cristiano's visit. She is later taken to the court for a hearing. Lourdeca makes a revelation.
88	24	"Episode 24"	17 November 2021
Visky and the models at the agency react to Lurdeca's announcement. Cristiano tries to find Bruno at the rehab clinic. Lua gets her first job as a model. Nalva advises Angel.
89	25	"Episode 25"	17 November 2021
Blanche makes Angel leave the agency. Visky promises Angel that he will help her. He then turns to Percy and asks him to convince Blanche and take Angel back. Cristiano helps Bruno escape from the clinic.
90	26	"Episode 26"	17 November 2021
Angel accepts Cristiano's proposal in order to put Giovanna in jail. Cristiano promises Angel to help her find the inheritance left by Guilherme. Lua unburdens herself on Cristiano. Lourdeca decides to move to another city.
91	27	"Episode 27"	17 November 2021
Visky tells Lua about the pink book. Giovanna looks for Percy at his house and is surprised by Angel. Laila learns about Ariel's secret. Blanche reveals Lourdeca's plan to Visky.
92	28	"Episode 28"	17 November 2021
Tânia finds Laila and calls Ariel. Giovanna feels threatened by Cristiano. Later, Cristiano has dinner with Lua, who makes an unusual request.
93	29	"Episode 29"	17 November 2021
Cristiano tells Angel that he loves her and promises to help her. Visky gives instructions for Lua's first pink book. Giovanna receives a court summon. Ariel tries to find out who gave Laila the medication.
94	30	"Episode 30"	17 November 2021
Giovanna turns to Cristiano in order to get rid of the charges against her, but learns that he is collaborating with Bruno. Questioned by Ariel, Blanche denies having given Laila medication. Mark catches Chiara with a client from the pink book.
95	31	"Episode 31"	1 December 2021
Giovanna is arrested for contempt of authority. Lourdeca has pregnant wishes. Ariel says that he will get revenge on whoever provided Laila with the medication. Fabrício takes a turn for the worse.
96	32	"Episode 32"	1 December 2021
Cristiano proposes to Giovanna for her to rehire him in order to prove Alex's death. Angel is surprised by Percy's marriage proposal. Lua is disappointed with her modeling career.
97	33	"Episode 33"	1 December 2021
Giovanna tells Cristiano that she will get the money for the investigation. Visky tells Giovanna that Percy has agreed to sponsor her fashion show, but on one condition.
98	34	"Episode 34"	1 December 2021
At the engagement dinner, Percy notices something between Betty and Matheus. Cristiano and Lua talk about the night they spent together. Cristiano tries to tell Percy's secret to Angel.
99	35	"Episode 35"	1 December 2021
Cristiano says goodbye and leaves to Angra dos Reis with Thaís in search of Alex's corpse. Angel fears what might be found.
100	36	"Episode 36"	1 December 2021
With Alex's corpse found, Giovanna is in a rush to get revenge on Angel. Giovanna and Bruno feign commotion to the press at the arrival of their father's corpse. Cristiano promises to have Angel on his hands.
101	37	"Episode 37"	1 December 2021
Visky tells Ariel the truth about Blanche. With the release of Alex's corpse expert examination scheduled, Angel feels insecure. Cristiano searches for Lua.
102	38	"Episode 38"	1 December 2021
Giovanna is disgusted by the results of the expert examination. Angel and Percy celebrate the conclusion of the case. At the nightclub, Ariel swears that he will get revenge on Blanche.
103	39	"Episode 39"	1 December 2021
Angel cries in Cristiano's arms and opens up to him. Ariel proposes to Blanche for Percy to be a partner in the agency. Fabrício's health takes a turn for the worse again. Giovanna does not accept seeing Angel free.
104	40	"Episode 40"	1 December 2021
Giovanna asks Cristiano to get Angel to confess to Alex's murder. Cristiano talks to the police deputy about his reinstatement to the corporation. Blanche overthinks her partnership with Percy.
105	41	"Episode 41"	13 December 2021
Cristiano hatches a plan to get Angel to confess to Alex's murder. Lua meets Cristiano and they talk about the stolen watch. Cristiano makes Angel a proposal.
106	42	"Episode 42"	13 December 2021
Angel catches Cristiano and Giovanna together. Betty plans a separation. Blanche makes a decision. Angel proposes a deal to Percy. Giovanna and Cristiano have an argument.
107	43	"Episode 43"	13 December 2021
Giovanna confronts Cristiano in order to get a recording of Angel's confession. Ariel continues his revenge plan.
108	44	"Episode 44"	13 December 2021
Angel suspects that Cristiano may have something against her. Giovanna hatches a plan to get in Cristiano's way. Igor finds Bruno unconscious.
109	45	"Episode 45"	13 December 2021
Giovanna blackmails Cristiano in order to get the recording of Angel's confession. Angel is threatened by Lua after refusing to hand her watch over. Angel answers Cristiano's marriage proposal.
110	46	"Episode 46"	13 December 2021
Angel urges Percy in order to rush their trip. Giovanna offers Cristiano hard cash for the recording of Angel's confession. Cristiano shows Angel the recording of her confession.
111	47	"Episode 47"	13 December 2021
Cristiano threatens Angel with the recording. Percy and his goons beat Cristiano up, who swears to destroy Angel. He then makes a decision.
112	48	"Episode 48"	13 December 2021
Ariel hires a hacker to access Blanche's accounts. Bruno makes plans to escape from the detox clinic. Angel visits Giovanna's apartment.
113	49	"Episode 49"	17 December 2021
Cristiano calls the press. Blanche learns that Ariel has withdrawn money from her accounts. Bruno escapes from the clinic with a fellow intern. Visky tries to convince Cristiano in order to get him to talk to Angel.
114	50	"Episode 50"	17 December 2021
Angel asks Nalva to pack Fabrício's bags for the trip. Blanche fires Visky, who begs for his position. Bruno surprises Pia and Igor. Ariel finalizes his revenge plan. (Note: The end of the second season features two different endings regarding Angel's fate. In order to maintain the viewers interest after Camila Queiroz's departure, TV Globo decided to keep the alternative endings, and will choose one of them as the official once the season airs on television.)

== DVD release ==
An abridged version of the first season, consisting of 25 episodes, was released on DVD in June 2016 by Globo Marcas.

Season	Episodes	Release dates			
Season	Episodes	Region 1	Region 2	Region 4	Discs
1	25	–	–	24 June 2016	13
