= Game dos 100 =

Brazilian game show

- Genre: Reality game show
- Based on: Homo Universalis
- Directed by: David Feldon
- Presented by: Felipe Andreoli; Rafa Brites; Márcia Fu
- Country of origin: Brazil
- Original language: Portuguese
- No. of seasons: 1
- No. of episodes: 10

Production
- Production location: Estúdios Vera Cruz
- Camera setup: Multiple-camera
- Running time: 105 minutes
- Production company: TeleImage

Original release
- Network: Record
- Release: July 20 – September 21, 2025

Game dos 100 (Note: In English: Game of 100) is a Brazilian game show television series that premiered on July 20, 2025, on Record, based on the Belgian format 99 to Beat (Homo Universalis), in which 100 contestants compete in elimination challenges until a single winner remains.

The series is hosted by Felipe Andreoli and Rafa Brites with Márcia Fu serving as correspondent, providing interviews and commentary throughout the competition.

== Format ==
Game dos 100 is based on the Belgian TV format 99 to Beat, where 100 contestants compete over the course of an entire season, going head-to-head in a series of ability challenges, with the rule that the person that comes last in the challenge is out of the game show.

At the end of the challenge, the player that loses has to leave the competition, adding R$3 to the pot, counting down from 100 to just 1. The last contestant remaining wins the prize of R$300.000.

== Contestants ==
The contestants were officially revealed by Record on July 15, 2025.

No.	Contestant	Age	Occupation	Place	Last place in the game	Status	Ref.
65	Lorena Alexandre	33	Singer	100th	Balloons with Hawaiian necklaces	Eliminated 1st on July 20, 2025	
85	Rita de Cássia	69	Retired	99th	Passing the flame	Eliminated 2nd on July 20, 2025	
38	Marcus Cowboy	25	Businessman	98th	Ring on the rod	Eliminated 3rd on July 20, 2025	
61	Vanessa Mesquita	38	Veterinary	97th	Drying the ice	Eliminated 4th on July 20, 2025	
17	Atilio Silva	20	Singer	96th	Hula hoop duel	Eliminated 5th on July 20, 2025	
18	Marcus Vinicius	60	Sociologist	95th	Penalty kick	Eliminated 6th on July 20, 2025	
78	Bia Souza	41	Digital influencer	94th	Unwinding the tape	Eliminated 7th on July 20, 2025	
81	Vovó Janete	75	Retired	93rd	Tennis on the wire	Eliminated 8th on July 20, 2025	
75	Ana Lucia	63	Manicurist	92nd	Three glasses, three balls	Eliminated 9th on July 20, 2025	
21	Jorge Samurai	71	Retired	91st	Looking for the podium	Eliminated 10th on July 20, 2025	
56	Jaquelline Cruz	41	Journalist	90th	Pile of clothes	Eliminated 11th on July 27, 2025	
67	Rosiane Pinheiro	50	Model	89th	Find the stuffed dog	Eliminated 12th on July 27, 2025	
03	Eduardo Flores	37	Sales representative	88th	Pendant on the wig	Eliminated 13th on July 27, 2025	
33	Yarley	24	Digital influencer	87th	Ball in the hat	Eliminated 14th on July 27, 2025	
19	Luís Mariotto	27	Administrative assistant	86th	Stack the nut	Eliminated 15th on July 27, 2025	
53	Fernanda Lacerda	36	Model	85th	True or false with Roberta Miranda	Eliminated 16th on July 27, 2025	
86	Maria Antonia Lopes	54	Self-employed	84th	Ball in the cup	Eliminated 17th on July 27, 2025	
43	Roberto GG	28	Barber	83rd	Blind pot filling	Eliminated 18th on July 27, 2025	
51	Van Kurashiki	33	Lawyer	82nd	Frisbee	Eliminated 19th on July 27, 2025	
04	Renato Flores	37	Sales representative	81st	Ball duel in the water	Eliminated 20th on July 27, 2025	
91	Tamares Nascimento	40	Cook	80th	Flower pot	Eliminated 21st on August 3, 2025	
60	Denise Bueno	38	Psychologist	79th	Crazy spring	Eliminated 22nd on August 3, 2025	
55	Cris Piza	34	Singer	78th	Put a string on the shorts	Eliminated 23rd on August 3, 2025	
41	Ovelha	69	Singer	77th	Balancing dice	Eliminated 24th on August 3, 2025	
32	Brunno Danese	25	Event producer	76th	Worm	Eliminated 25th on August 3, 2025	
79	Alane Pereira	39	Dancer	75th	Moving cups with balloons	Eliminated 26th on August 3, 2025	
93	Bettina	32	Drag queen	74th	Shake it	Eliminated 27th on August 3, 2025	
15	Nelson Neves	40	Cryptocurrency expert	73rd	Unwind the line	Eliminated 28th on August 3, 2025	
88	Jade Puente	24	Actress	72nd	Pick up a can of pasta	Eliminated 29th on August 3, 2025	
58	Salete Campari	59	Drag queen	71st	Blowing confetti	Eliminated 30th on August 3, 2025	
95	Carol Godoi	32	Entrepreneur	70th	Giant bowling	Eliminated 31st on August 10, 2025	
48	Matheus Prado	19	Digital influencer	69th	Stacking cans	Eliminated 32nd on August 10, 2025	
90	Fernanda Gomes	33	Military police officer	68th	Pot with balls	Eliminated 33rd on August 10, 2025	
14	Caio Maron	47	Lawyer	67th	Sorting candies	Eliminated 34th on August 10, 2025	
45	Edgard Diamante	43	Rapper	66th	Paper airplane	Eliminated 35th on August 10, 2025	
82	Renata Stapf	59	Kindergarten teacher	65th	Placing batteries in the lantern	Eliminated 36th on August 10, 2025	
62	Yanne Anttunes	38	Businesswoman	64th	Mega volleyball	Eliminated 37th on August 10, 2025	
24	Edílson Chiquinho	60	Actor	63rd	Cherry on the head	Eliminated 38th on August 10, 2025	
66	MC Mello	22	Singer	62nd	Basket on the bike	Eliminated 39th on August 10, 2025	
99	Thais Cristina	38	Bartender	61st	Find the tupperware lid	Eliminated 40th on August 10, 2025	
54	Day Oliveira	37	Digital influencer	60th	Ball pit	Eliminated 41st on August 17, 2025	
83	Graci Zermiani	43	Golfer	59th	Dance of the lights	Eliminated 42nd on August 17, 2025	
39	Blade	44	Dancer	58th	Book on the head	Eliminated 43rd on August 17, 2025	
77	Luana Sales	41	Dancer	57th	Bulls-eye	Eliminated 44th on August 17, 2025	
71	Mari Belém	45	Singer	56th	Cotton swab and vaseline castle	Eliminated 45th on August 17, 2025	
68	Janaína do Mar	50	Entrepreneur	55th	Shout contest	Eliminated 46th on August 17, 2025	
72	Carolina Arjonas	29	Model	54th	Thrift shop	Eliminated 47th on August 17, 2025	
29	Nick Cruz	26	Singer	53rd	Storing ribbons	Eliminated 48th on August 17, 2025	
42	Wender Guidine	43	Hypnosis specialist	52nd	Needle in the haystack	Eliminated 49th on August 17, 2025	
98	Babi Cris	37	Plus size model	51st	Block race	Eliminated 50th on August 17, 2025	
100	Joi Almeida	20	Business student	50th	Bubble on the gutter	Eliminated 51st on August 24, 2025	
47	Renan Oliveira	37	Model	49th	Transporting balls with spoon	Eliminated 52nd on August 24, 2025	
26	Samuel Simões	24	Actor	48th	Drink fishing	Eliminated 53rd on August 24, 2025	
34	Fábio Gontijo	39	Dermatologist	47th	Balloon cannot fall	Eliminated 54th on August 24, 2025	
30	Mack Lery	40	Rapper	46th	Sink or float	Eliminated 55th on August 24, 2025	
08	Gilson Santiago	41	Barber	45th	Pull the carpet roll with feet	Eliminated 56th on August 24, 2025	
01	Estevan	27	Musician	44th	Aiming at the cup	Eliminated 57th on August 24, 2025	
69	Kamila Simioni	39	Businesswoman	43rd	Hold wood and domino	Eliminated 58th on August 24, 2025	
64	Poliana Roberta	30	Actress	42nd	Human train	Eliminated 59th on August 24, 2025	
94	Semille	32	Esports announcer	41st	Balancing the cup	Eliminated 60th on August 24, 2025	
92	Samantha Shara	35	Digital influencer	40th	Flashlight hunting	Eliminated 61st on August 31, 2025	
57	Ângela Bismarchi	58	Theologian	39th	Gallon of Polka Dots	Eliminated 62nd on August 31, 2025	
87	Aline Golias	36	Digital influencer	38th	Unroll, roll	Eliminated 63rd on August 31, 2025	
09	Anderson Calisthenics	30	Physical education teacher	37th	Cardboard chain	Eliminated 64th on August 31, 2025	
70	Adryana Ribeiro	51	Singer	36th	Stack of boxes	Eliminated 65th on August 31, 2025	
31	Di Campagnolli	37	Actor	35th	Duckling transport	Eliminated 66th on August 31, 2025	
84	Carla Moraes	26	Digital influencer	34th	Catch the bouquet	Eliminated 67th on August 31, 2025	
22	Rei da Manga	22	Marketer	33rd	Dominoes	Eliminated 68th on August 31, 2025	
74	Regina Schazzitt	38	Drag queen	32nd	The floor is lava	Eliminated 69th on August 31, 2025	
36	Fernando Presto	39	Chef	31st	Spiral in the cup	Eliminated 70th on August 31, 2025	
63	Rayana Diniz	35	Digital influencer	30th	Catching balls	Eliminated 71st on September 7, 2025	
80	Sabrina Tellini	28	Bodybuilder	29th	Paper puzzle	Eliminated 72nd on September 7, 2025	
49	Táila Cavalcante	25	Fashion student	28th	Alarm clock	Eliminated 73rd on September 7, 2025	
35	Alex Gallete	36	Reporter	27th	Hammering nails	Eliminated 74th on September 7, 2025	
27	Anderson Lima	31	Digital influencer	26th	Candy with straw	Eliminated 75th on September 7, 2025	
44	JP Mantovani †	45	Model	25th	Piñata	Eliminated 76th on September 7, 2025	
07	Ewerton Seixas	30	Exchange travel specialist	24th	Ball in the cut	Eliminated 77th on September 7, 2025	
59	Alisha	34	Tantric therapist	23rd	Ping-pong on the farm	Eliminated 78th on September 7, 2025	
96	Ilane de Paula	35	Children storyteller	22nd	Waiter for a day	Eliminated 79th on September 7, 2025	
76	Martha Ramony	31	Digital influencer	21st	Ball on the tape measure	Eliminated 80th on September 7, 2025	
02	Ricardo Flores	37	Sales representative	20th	Emptying the floats	Eliminated 81st on September 14, 2025	
16	Marcin	21	Digital influencer	19th	Spinning top	Eliminated 82nd on September 14, 2025	
13	Marcelo Souzano	33	Therapist	18th	Boarding allowed	Eliminated 83rd on September 14, 2025	
25	João Zoli	32	Singer	17th	Stacking Cans	Eliminated 84th on September 14, 2025	
40	Biel Azevedo	35	Actor	16th	Balloon tent	Eliminated 85th on September 14, 2025	
73	Ray Erlich	26	Actress	15th	Hanging a picture with boxing glove	Eliminated 86th on September 14, 2025	
46	Renan Brasil	25	Actor	14th	Tennis accuracy	Eliminated 87th on September 14, 2025	
52	Léo Placido	34	Lawyer	13th	Duck feet	Eliminated 88th on September 14, 2025	
97	Daniela Maciel	43	Singer	12th	Sailing little boat	Eliminated 89th on September 14, 2025	
12	Alexis Couto	27	IP specialist	11th	Cup tower	Eliminated 90th on September 14, 2025	
11	Vinicius Brandão	26	Twin model	10th	Math in the ball pit	Eliminated 91st on September 21, 2025	
28	Wagner Santiago	43	Visual artist	9th	Carpet skiing	Eliminated 92nd on September 21, 2025	
05	Wellington Sébria	23	Construction worker	8th	Office circuit	Eliminated 93rd on September 21, 2025	
89	Michele Santana	43	Muay Thai fighter	7th	Fishing in the aquarium	Eliminated 94th on September 21, 2025	
37	Maloy	51	Jiu-jitsu fighter	6th	Leaky vase	Eliminated 95th on September 21, 2025	
23	Michael Calasans	32	App driver	5th	Seesaw vase	Eliminated 96th on September 21, 2025	
10	Venâncio Brandão	26	Twin model	4th	Tic-tac-toe in the basins	Eliminated 97th on September 21, 2025	
20	Patric Santanna	32	Barber	3rd	Pendulum in the can	Eliminated 98th on September 21, 2025	
06	Márcio Camara	41	Public servant	2nd	Final duel	Runner-up on September 21, 2025	
50	João Cavalcante	25	Delivery rider	1st	—N/a	Winner on September 21, 2025	

== Results ==
Due to size constraints, this table will only include the top 10 contestants.

Episode 10 – Final
Game:	91	92	93	94	95	96	97	98	99
João Cavalcante	SAFE	SAFE	SAFE	SAFE	SAFE	SAFE	SAFE	SAFE	WINNER
Márcio Camara	SAFE	SAFE	SAFE	SAFE	SAFE	SAFE	SAFE	SAFE	RUNNER-UP
Patric Santanna	SAFE	SAFE	SAFE	SAFE	SAFE	SAFE	SAFE	OUT	
Venâncio Brandão	SAFE	SAFE	SAFE	SAFE	SAFE	SAFE	OUT		
Michael Calasans	SAFE	SAFE	SAFE	SAFE	SAFE	OUT			
Maloy	SAFE	SAFE	SAFE	SAFE	OUT				
Michele Santana	SAFE	SAFE	SAFE	OUT					
Wellington Sébria	SAFE	SAFE	OUT						
Wagner Santiago	SAFE	OUT							
Vinicius Brandão	OUT								

Key

- The contestant finished in first place in the final game and won Game dos 100.
- The contestant finished in last place in the final game and was the runner-up.
- The contestant advanced in the game and was safe from elimination.
- The contestant finished in last place in the game and was eliminated.

== Ratings and reception ==
=== Brazilian ratings ===
All numbers are in points and provided by Kantar Ibope Media.

Episode	Title	Air date	Timeslot (BRT)	SP viewers (in points)	BR viewers (in points)	Ref.
1	Top 100	July 20, 2025	Sunday 3:30 p.m.	3.9	Outside top 10	
2	Top 90	July 27, 2025	Sunday 2:00 p.m.	3.2	Outside top 10	
3	Top 80	August 3, 2025	Sunday 2:00 p.m.	3.0	Outside top 10	
4	Top 70	August 10, 2025	Sunday 2:00 p.m.	2.8	Outside top 10	
5	Top 60	August 17, 2025	Sunday 2:00 p.m.	3.0	Outside top 10	
6	Top 50	August 24, 2025	Sunday 2:00 p.m.	3.1	Outside top 10	
7	Top 40	August 31, 2025	Sunday 2:00 p.m.	2.4	Outside top 10	
8	Top 30	September 7, 2025	Sunday 2:00 p.m.	2.4	Outside top 10	
9	Top 20	September 14, 2025	Sunday 2:00 p.m.	2.4	Outside top 10	
10	Final	September 21, 2025	Sunday 2:00 p.m.	2.7	Outside top 10	

- In 2025, each point represents 270.631 households in 15 market cities in Brazil (77.488 households in São Paulo).
