= Love Is Blind: Brazil season 2 =

2022 Brazilian reality TV series

Love Is Blind: Brazil
- Season 2
- Presented by: Camila Queiroz; Klebber Toledo
- No. of episodes: 11

Release
- Original network: Netflix
- Original release: December 28, 2022 – February 1, 2023

Season chronology
- ← Previous; Season 1 Next → Season 3

The second season of Love Is Blind: Brazil (Portuguese: Casamento às Cegas: Brasil) premiered on Netflix on December 28, 2022, as part of a three-week event. Brazilian celebrity couple Camila Queiroz and Klebber Toledo returned for their second season as hosts.

== Season summary ==
Couples	Married	Still together	Relationship notes
Thamara and Alisson	Yes	No	Thamara and Alisson got married in May 2022. At the reunion, it was revealed that the two were still together. On June 11, 2023, Thamara announced that the couple had separated.
Flávia and Robert	Yes	No	Flávia and Robert got married in May 2022. They separated later after Flávia discovered that Robert was cheating on her.
Vanessa and Tiago	No	No	They split up on their wedding day after they both said no. Vanessa revealed that Tiago had originally planned to say yes "just for the show" but changed his mind after learning that Will had said no.
Verônica and Will	No	No	They split up on their wedding day after Will said no, blindsiding Verônica, who had said yes.
Maíra and Guilherme	No	No	They split up after a fight. At the reunion, they revealed that they are now in new relationships. Maíra also claimed that Guilherme was texting his current girlfriend at the time of filming.

== Participants ==
Name	Age	Occupation	Hometown	Relationship Status
Thamara Térez	30	Lawyer	Rio de Janeiro	Married, split after the wedding.
Alisson Hentges	27	Administrator	Rio Grande do Sul	Married, split after the wedding.
Flávia Queiroz	27	Nurse	Minas Gerais	Married, split after the wedding.
Robert Richard	29	Personal trainer	São Paulo	Married, split after the wedding.
Vanessa Carvalho	32	Psychologist	Minas Gerais	Split at the wedding
Tiago Chapola	36	Trade representative	São Paulo	Split at the wedding
Verônica Brito	31	Model	São Paulo	Split at the wedding
William "Will" Domiêncio	26	Accounting assistant	São Paulo	Split at the wedding
Maíra Bullos	31	Social media manager	Rio de Janeiro	Split before the wedding
Guilherme Martins	29	Air traffic controller	Espírito Santo	Split before the wedding
Amanda Souza	35	Image consultant	São Paulo	Split after first meeting
Paulo Simi Lopes	33	HR specialist	São Paulo	Split after first meeting
Akin Santos	N/A			Not engaged
Alexandre Aragon	N/A			Not engaged
Andre Luiz Alves	N/A			Not engaged
Antonia Andrade	N/A			Not engaged
Bruna Ferreira	N/A			Not engaged
Carolina Rodrigues	N/A			Not engaged
Gil Vieira	N/A			Not engaged
Isabela Calderaro	N/A			Not engaged
Juliana Moura	N/A			Not engaged
Kelly Queiroz	N/A			Not engaged
Lucas Aulucci	N/A			Not engaged
Lucas Soares	N/A			Not engaged
Marcelo Ullmann	N/A			Not engaged
Marcos Paunksnis	N/A			Not engaged
Mari Carvalho	N/A			Not engaged
Melissa Pio	N/A			Not engaged
Rodolfo Gomes	N/A			Not engaged
Priscilla Ogata	N/A			Not engaged
Samanta Soares	N/A			Not engaged
Thiago Andreotti	N/A			Not engaged

=== Future appearances ===
In 2023, Will Domiêncio appeared in third season of De Férias com o Ex Caribe as a VIP original cast member.

In 2024, Vanessa Carvalho appeared in A Fazenda 16, where she was the 16th contestant to be evicted on day 94, finishing in 6th place.

== Episodes ==
No. overall	No. in season	Title	Original release date
Week 1
12	1	"Anyone There?"	December 28, 2022
13	2	"If We Work Together, Everyone Can Get Married"	December 28, 2022
14	3	"Junglemoon"	December 28, 2022
15	4	"So Was There Chemistry?"	December 28, 2022
Week 2
16	5	"Official Real Life"	January 4, 2023
17	6	"Reality Check"	January 4, 2023
18	7	"You've Never Eaten Feijoada?"	January 4, 2023
19	8	"Trial by Fire!"	January 4, 2023
Week 3
20	9	"Hit the Floor, Couples!"	January 11, 2023
21	10	"Is Love Blind After All?"	January 11, 2023
Special
22	11	"The Reunion"	February 1, 2023

== Critical response ==
The season was noted for increasing the representation of Black contestants and people with larger bodies. Reviews also criticized parts of the cast and its romantic storylines while highlighting the season's entertainment value and social discussions surrounding body image, sexism and relationships.

== Production ==
=== Filming ===
Filming began in São Paulo in March 2022, and lasted 39 days up until the weddings. After the five newly engaged couples left the pods, filming took place at the Mirante do Gavião Amazon Lodge in Novo Airão, about 180 km upstream of Manaus, Amazonas, when all the couples went on a retreat. Then, the relationships that made it through the retreat moved in together in an apartment complex in São Paulo, where they spent the rest of the time filming up until the weddings in May 2022.

=== Fatphobia Controversy ===
Amanda Souza faced fatphobia during her participation in the show. She became engaged to Paulo Simi, but he chose not to continue the relationship after meeting her in person for the first time, an incident that was criticized as fatphobic. In 2024, following a separate incident involving a participant in the fourth season, Amanda launched the social media trend #EuTenhoVozDeGorda, calling attention to fatphobia and advocating for greater representation of fat people.
