= Love Is Blind: Brazil season 4 =

2024 Brazilian reality TV series

Love Is Blind: Brazil
- Season 4
- Presented by: Camila Queiroz; Klebber Toledo
- No. of episodes: 11

Release
- Original network: Netflix
- Original release: June 19 – July 10, 2024

Season chronology
- ← Previous; Season 3 Next → Season 5

The fourth season of Love Is Blind: Brazil (Portuguese: Casamento às Cegas: Brasil) premiered on Netflix on June 19, 2024, as part of a three-week event. Camila Queiroz and Klebber Toledo returned as hosts.

As part of a twist, the season featured a more mature cast of individuals, all seeking love a second time after being engaged, divorced or separated. Consequently, the season was renamed Love Is Blind Brazil: A Fresh Start.

== Season summary ==
Couples	Married	Still together	Relationship notes
Vanessa and Leonardo	Yes	Yes	Vanessa and Leonardo got married in a beach ceremony. At the reunion, it was revealed that they were still together and hoping to get pregnant soon.
Muriel and Kaled	Yes	Yes	Muriel and Kaled got engaged but were not selected by Netflix for the show's honeymoon phase. At the reunion, they revealed they had continued their relationship and later married in an outdoor ceremony in November 2024.
Renata and Alexandre	Yes	Yes	Renata and Alexandre got married. At the reunion, they revealed they no longer lived together and were in a non-monogamous relationship. The couple separated in August 2024 but reconciled in April 2025. They will welcome their first child in early 2026.
Ingrid and Leandro	Yes	No	Ingrid and Leandro got married. At the reunion, she cited sexual incompatibilities and later filed a police report for sexual abuse, requesting a restraining order.
Marília and Patrick	No	No	They did not get married as Patrick believed he was 'not just yet' ready. At the reunion, Marília announced that neither of them believed it was the right time to exchange vows.
Ariela and Evandro	No	No	They split up after Ariela confronted Evandro about a third child that he had hidden and an ex he kept in touch with that he called 'love'.

== Participants ==
Name	Age	Occupation	Hometown	Relationship Status
Vanessa Kurashiki	33	Lawyer	Santos	Married
Leonardo Plácido	34	Lawyer	Santos	Married
Muriel De Aquino Silva	36	Sales executive	Salvador	Married
Gabriel Kaled	31	Economist	Magé	Married
Renata Gaiffredo	33	Lawyer	São Paulo	Married, split, then reunited; currently together
Alexandre Thomaz	34	Event industry worker	São Paulo	Married, split, then reunited; currently together
Ingrid Santa Rita	33	Architect	Osasco	Married, split after the wedding
Leandro Marçal	32	Former football player	São Paulo	Married, split after the wedding
Marília Pinheiro	37	Digital creator	São Paulo	Split at the wedding
Patrick Ribeiro	32	Traffic manager	São Paulo	Split at the wedding
Ariela Carasso	34	Event planner	São Paulo	Split before their wedding
Evandro Pinto	35	Security officer & trader	São Paulo	Split before their wedding
Marcia Ishimoto	34	Event promotion worker	São Paulo	Split before first meeting
André Romano	30	Compliance analyst	São Paulo	Split before first meeting
Alyne Juliana	N/A			Not engaged
Camila Bobrov	N/A			Not engaged
Carla Rezende	N/A			Not engaged
Evellyn Siqueira	N/A			Not engaged
Fabricio Pinato	N/A			Not engaged
Gutto Lima	N/A			Not engaged
Jéssica Lopes	N/A			Not engaged
Karina Carmo	N/A			Not engaged
Lucas Almagro	N/A			Not engaged
Marina Oliveira	N/A			Not engaged
Mika Veyver	N/A			Not engaged
Priscila Neves	N/A			Not engaged
Renata Pascoal	N/A			Not engaged
Ricky Cantor	N/A			Not engaged
Rodrigo Knoeller	N/A			Not engaged
Vinicius Novais	N/A			Not engaged
Weverton Maciel	N/A			Not engaged

=== Future appearances ===
In 2025, Vanessa Kurashiki and Leonardo Plácido competed on Game dos 100. Kurashiki was eliminated in the 19th round, placing 82nd, while Plácido was eliminated in the 88th round, placing 13th.

== Episodes ==
No. overall	No. in season	Title	Original release date
Week 1
34	1	"A Fresh Start on Love"	June 19, 2024
35	2	"To Those Who Thought They'd Never Love Again"	June 19, 2024
36	3	"Royal Honeymoon"	June 19, 2024
37	4	"Love After Retreat"	June 19, 2024
Week 2
38	5	"Let's See What Happens"	June 26, 2024
39	6	"Father of the Bride"	June 26, 2024
40	7	"No Bed of Roses"	June 26, 2024
41	8	"Fit for a Fitting"	June 26, 2024
Week 3
42	9	"Let's Get Married!"	July 3, 2024
43	10	"Is Love Blind After All?"	July 3, 2024
Special
44	11	"The Reunion"	July 10, 2024

== Production ==
=== Filming ===
Filming began in São Paulo in August 2023 and lasted 39 days up until the weddings. After the five newly engaged couples left the pods, filming took place at the Rio Do Rastro Eco Resort in Bom Jardim da Serra, Santa Catarina, where all the couples went on a retreat, marking the first time the show featured a winter honeymoon location. Then, the relationships that made it through the retreat moved in together in an apartment complex in São Paulo, where they spent the rest of the time filming up until the weddings in October 2023.

=== Abuse allegations ===
Ingrid Santa Rita, accused her former husband, Leandro Marçal, of rape and domestic violence. She alleged that he engaged in sexual acts with her without her consent while she was asleep. A court in São Paulo granted Ingrid a protective order, and the Civil Police opened an investigation into the allegations. Marçal denied the accusations, stating that he had never committed any unlawful act.
