= Love Is Blind: Brazil season 3 =

2023 Brazilian reality TV series

Love Is Blind: Brazil
- Season 3
- Presented by: Camila Queiroz; Klebber Toledo
- No. of episodes: 11

Release
- Original network: Netflix
- Original release: June 7 – July 2, 2023

Season chronology
- ← Previous; Season 2 Next → Season 4

The third season of Love Is Blind: Brazil (Portuguese: Casamento às Cegas: Brasil) premiered on Netflix on June 7, 2023, as part of a three-week event. Brazilian celebrity couple Camila Queiroz and Klebber Toledo returned for their third season as hosts.

== Season summary ==
Couples	Married	Still together	Relationship notes
Ágata and Renan	Yes	Yes	Ágata and Renan got married in October 2022. On February 7th, 2026, the couple announced their pregnancy.
Maria and Menandro	Yes	No	Maria and Menandro got married in October 2022. On March 18, 2025, Maria announced that the couple had separated.
Bianca and Jarbas	Yes	No	Bianca and Jarbas got married in October 2022. On January 17, 2024, Bianca announced that the couple had separated.
Daniela and Daniel	Yes	No	Daniela and Daniel got married in October 2022. On October 3, 2023, Daniela announced that the couple had separated.
Karen and Valmir	Yes	No	Karen and Valmir married in October 2022 but separated two weeks later after he asked her to leave his apartment three days after moving in. At the reunion, she got engaged to Italo from the show, only to break up after two days due to infidelity on his part.

== Participants ==
Name	Age	Occupation	Hometown	Relationship Status
Ágata Moura	31	Advertising	Sapopemba	Married
Renan Justino	30	Physiotherapist	Santos	Married
Maria Carolina Caporusso	29	Businesswoman	Ribeirão Preto	Married, split after the wedding
Menandro Rosa	31	Shopkeeper	São Paulo	Married, split after the wedding
Bianca Sessa	29	Nutritionist	Santos	Married, split after the wedding
Jarbas Andrade	31	Businessman	Guarulhos	Married, split after the wedding
Daniela Silva	36	Businesswoman	São Paulo	Married, split after the wedding
Daniel Manzoni	31	Production engineer	São Bernardo do Campo	Married, split after the wedding
Karen Bacic	33	Lawyer	Santos	Married, split after the wedding
Valmir Reis	34	Commercial director	São Paulo	Married, split after the wedding
Ana Carolina Araújo	N/A			Not engaged
Bárbara Santos	N/A			Not engaged
Beatriz Nogueira	N/A			Not engaged
Carlos Ramos	N/A			Not engaged
Carolina Pinto	N/A			Not engaged
Eduardo Froner	N/A			Not engaged
Flavio Raphael	N/A			Not engaged
Felipe Carvalho	N/A			Not engaged
Gabriele Damiano	N/A			Not engaged
Gustavo Biedermann	N/A			Not engaged
Igor Camargo	N/A			Not engaged
Italo Antonelli	N/A			Not engaged
Patricia Medeiros	N/A			Not engaged
Raphael Xavier	N/A			Not engaged
Renata Mendes	N/A			Not engaged
Rosana Rodrigues	N/A			Not engaged
Ste Wassermann	N/A			Not engaged
Tati Monteiro	N/A			Not engaged
Tatiani Rigotti	N/A			Not engaged
Thiago Licciardi	N/A			Not engaged
Vini Rega	N/A			Not engaged
Vitor Ely	N/A			Not engaged

== Episodes ==
No. overall	No. in season	Title	Original release date
Week 1
23	1	"I'm Getting Married!"	June 7, 2023
24	2	"A Thousand Times Yes"	June 7, 2023
25	3	"Who Didn't Howl?"	June 7, 2023
26	4	"Top Rest!"	June 7, 2023
Week 2
27	5	"Move On and Leave the Past Behind!"	June 14, 2023
28	6	"A Couple's Tattoo!"	June 14, 2023
29	7	"Trying On Dreams!"	June 14, 2023
30	8	"Players Fall in Love, Too!"	June 14, 2023
Week 3
31	9	"We're in It Together!"	June 21, 2023
32	10	"Did Love Win?"	June 21, 2023
Special
33	11	"The Live Reunion"	July 2, 2023

== Production ==
=== Filming ===
In January 2023, it was revealed that shooting for the third season begun in secret shortly after production of season 2 was completed. Filming began in São Paulo in August 2022 and lasted 39 days up until the weddings. After the five newly engaged couples left the pods, filming took place at Madeiro Beach Hotel Resort in Pipa Beach, Tibau do Sul, about 84 km from Natal, Rio Grande do Norte, when all the couples went on a retreat. Then, the relationships that made it through the retreat moved in together in an apartment complex in São Paulo, where they spent the rest of the time filming up until the weddings in October 2022.

=== Match-fixing allegations ===
According to the press, Maria Carolina Caporusso and Valmir Reis had known each other before filming, while Maria had also had prior contact with Menandro Rosa, the participant she chose. In addition, Maria, Menandro, Ágata Moura and Renan Justino were reportedly represented by a company associated with hosts Camila Queiroz and Klebber Toledo. Endemol Shine Brasil denied the allegations and stated that the casting process followed the reality show's established procedures.
