= 99 to Beat (British game show) =

2025 British television game show

- Genre: Reality game show
- Based on: Homo Universalis by VRT, Primitives TV and De Chinezen
- Presented by: Adam and Ryan Thomas
- Country of origin: United Kingdom
- Original language: English
- No. of seasons: 1
- No. of episodes: 8

Production
- Production location: Shinfield Studios
- Running time: 60 minutes
- Production company: Initial

Original release
- Network: ITV1
- Release: 22 March – 10 May 2025

99 to Beat is a British game show where 100 contestants are reduced each round until one person wins the cash prize.

The show is hosted by Adam and Ryan Thomas. It was premiered on ITV on 22 March 2025.

The show was cancelled on 7 August 2025, after one series.

== Format ==
99 to Beat is based on the Belgian TV format Homo Universalis, where 100 contestants compete over the course of an entire season, going head-to-head in a series of ability challenges, with the rule that the person that comes last in the challenge is out of the game show.

At the end of the challenge, the player or team that loses has to leave the competition, counting down from 100 players to just one. In most games, the last person to complete a set task is the loser, while a player may also be eliminated in certain games for being the first person to fail a task, or having a guess furthest away from the exact number. In some games (once per episode in all episodes except the final), contestants are placed into teams of equal size, in which the whole losing team is eliminated, reducing the group even further.

The last contestant remaining wins the prize, which was £25,000.

== Contestants ==
Results (Season 1)
Contestant	Age (Note: At time of recording)	Occupation	Place	Last place in the challenge	Status
Edward Oldfield	45	Cafe worker	100th	Sit on an exercise ball blindfolded	Eliminated 1st on 22 March 2025
Dilan Kurt	22	Barber	99th	Slinky on your forehead	Eliminated 2nd on 22 March 2025
Calvin Price	40	Psychic medium	98th	Balance a drinks can at a 45° angle	Eliminated 3rd on 22 March 2025
Caroline Baxter	47	Letting agent	97th	Ping-pong ball on a spoon in your mouth	Eliminated 4th on 22 March 2025
Adam	31	Firefighter; Partner of Dani G	85th-96th	Drainpipe bowling (Note: Team elimination game)	Eliminated 5th on 22 March 2025
Andrew			85th-96th	Drainpipe bowling	Eliminated 5th on 22 March 2025
Bailie Buchanan			85th-96th	Drainpipe bowling	Eliminated 5th on 22 March 2025
Deb Jayaprakash			85th-96th	Drainpipe bowling	Eliminated 5th on 22 March 2025
Ed			85th-96th	Drainpipe bowling	Eliminated 5th on 22 March 2025
Jane Kutiwa			85th-96th	Drainpipe bowling	Eliminated 5th on 22 March 2025
Julie			85th-96th	Drainpipe bowling	Eliminated 5th on 22 March 2025
Kieran Turner			85th-96th	Drainpipe bowling	Eliminated 5th on 22 March 2025
Kyle Downie			85th-96th	Drainpipe bowling	Eliminated 5th on 22 March 2025
Pam			85th-96th	Drainpipe bowling	Eliminated 5th on 22 March 2025
Phill			85th-96th	Drainpipe bowling	Eliminated 5th on 22 March 2025
Robert Elwes			85th-96th	Drainpipe bowling	Eliminated 5th on 22 March 2025
Les Heyhoe	67	Retired administrator	84th	Defrost a frozen T-shirt	Eliminated 6th on 22 March 2025
Lisa Jane Russell (Note: Lisa withdrew from the competition after suffering an ankle injury in the previous game. She was replaced by Ali.)	50	Beautician	WD	Defrost a frozen T-shirt	Withdrew on 22 March 2025
Yae	30	Office administrator	83rd	Extract a £2 coin from a piggy bank	Eliminated 7th on 22 March 2025
Jodie Crees (Note: Jodie and Michael both left the competition after the first episode and did not return for the second episode. They were replaced by Frankie and Lewis.)		Wife of Michael	WD	Extract a £2 coin from a piggy bank	Withdrew on 22 March 2025
Michael Crees	40	Racing driver Husband of Jodie	WD	Extract a £2 coin from a piggy bank	Withdrew on 22 March 2025
Janet Thompson	50	Receptionist	82nd	Guess the weight of a llama	Eliminated 8th on 29 March 2025
Tony	77	Retired retail manager	81st	Fit sticky tape in a lunchbox	Eliminated 9th on 29 March 2025
Paul Mason	63	Retired civil servant	80th	Retract a measuring tape between two lines	Eliminated 10th on 29 March 2025
Paul Smailes	60	Paranormal investigator	79th	Loop six penne pasta pieces onto spaghetti in your mouth	Eliminated 11th on 29 March 2025
Bethany Bradley			66th-78th	Domino rally	Eliminated 12th on 29 March 2025
Biddy Scanlon	26	Delivery driver	66th-78th	Domino rally	Eliminated 12th on 29 March 2025
Bruno Pinto			66th-78th	Domino rally	Eliminated 12th on 29 March 2025
Charlie M			66th-78th	Domino rally	Eliminated 12th on 29 March 2025
Chelsey Fearon			66th-78th	Domino rally	Eliminated 12th on 29 March 2025
Dan Parfitt			66th-78th	Domino rally	Eliminated 12th on 29 March 2025
Dani G	30	Project co-ordinator Partner of Adam	66th-78th	Domino rally	Eliminated 12th on 29 March 2025
Ellie Bartle			66th-78th	Domino rally	Eliminated 12th on 29 March 2025
Ian Zippy			66th-78th	Domino rally	Eliminated 12th on 29 March 2025
Mike Adams	64	Retired manager	66th-78th	Domino rally	Eliminated 12th on 29 March 2025
Safyah	29	Financial audit manager	66th-78th	Domino rally	Eliminated 12th on 29 March 2025
Sue Hartley	61	Retired lecturer	66th-78th	Domino rally	Eliminated 12th on 29 March 2025
Tom			66th-78th	Domino rally	Eliminated 12th on 29 March 2025
Paul Oliver	21	Scaffolder	65th	Hold a flower in secateurs at shoulder height	Eliminated 13th on 29 March 2025
Katy Henry	41	School teacher	64th	Giant volleyball match	Eliminated 14th on 29 March 2025
Freddie Cashbolt	26	Voice actor	63rd	Knock a balloon off with rubber bands	Eliminated 15th on 5 April 2025
Ali	34	Teacher	62nd	Balance eleven loose nails on top of another nail	Eliminated 16th on 5 April 2025
Jeff	74	Retired prison governor	61st	Make and throw a paper plane	Eliminated 17th on 5 April 2025
Aaron Mukerji			49th-60th	Flip pancakes down the line	Eliminated 18th on 5 April 2025
Dáire McGill			49th-60th	Flip pancakes down the line	Eliminated 18th on 5 April 2025
Flex Singh	25	Actor/martial arts	49th-60th	Flip pancakes down the line	Eliminated 18th on 5 April 2025
Frankie Fitzgerald			49th-60th	Flip pancakes down the line	Eliminated 18th on 5 April 2025
Georgia Kennon	19	Student; Twin sister of Courtney	49th-60th	Flip pancakes down the line	Eliminated 18th on 5 April 2025
Kingsley Hamilton	45	Bus driver	49th-60th	Flip pancakes down the line	Eliminated 18th on 5 April 2025
Louis Moyes	20	Student	49th-60th	Flip pancakes down the line	Eliminated 18th on 5 April 2025
Megan Holly	24	Content creator	49th-60th	Flip pancakes down the line	Eliminated 18th on 5 April 2025
Miles Williams			49th-60th	Flip pancakes down the line	Eliminated 18th on 5 April 2025
Neil Greenwood			49th-60th	Flip pancakes down the line	Eliminated 18th on 5 April 2025
Nevaeh	19	Retail assistant	49th-60th	Flip pancakes down the line	Eliminated 18th on 5 April 2025
Surabhi Shubz			49th-60th	Flip pancakes down the line	Eliminated 18th on 5 April 2025
Bianca Starkie	32	Team leader	48th	Guess the number of peas	Eliminated 19th on 5 April 2025
Lewis Greenough	20	Graduate	47th	Light three tealight candles and place them into tealight holders	Eliminated 20th on 5 April 2025
Will Miles	19	Bartender	46th	Find the T-shirt with your name on it	Eliminated 21st on 12 April 2025
Charlie Hernan	27	Jeweller	41st-45th	Find teammates with the same instrument while blindfolded	Eliminated 22nd on 12 April 2025
Georgia Gregory-Morris	23	Acupuncturist	41st-45th	Find teammates with the same instrument while blindfolded	Eliminated 22nd on 12 April 2025
Shane Yerrell	40	Mayor of Waltham Abbey	41st-45th	Find teammates with the same instrument while blindfolded	Eliminated 22nd on 12 April 2025
Will Lawford	21	Escape room manager	41st-45th	Find teammates with the same instrument while blindfolded	Eliminated 22nd on 12 April 2025
Will Thomas			41st-45th	Find teammates with the same instrument while blindfolded	Eliminated 22nd on 12 April 2025
Amy Morris	20	Finance assistant	40th	Peel a potato to produce as long a peel as possible	Eliminated 23rd on 12 April 2025
Amir Jardan	39	Fire alarm technician	39th	Push off a scooter without stepping off	Eliminated 24th on 12 April 2025
Mia Welsh	23	Theatre performer	38th	Bounce a pencil into a pot	Eliminated 25th on 12 April 2025
Dexter Lartey	30	Maths tutor	37th	Fire a champagne cork	Eliminated 26th on 12 April 2025
Jake Farrar	27	Cobbler	36th	Guess the decade of pop songs	Eliminated 27th on 19 April 2025
Beth Derbyshire			31st-35th	Balance an egg on a drinks tray with only your index finger	Eliminated 28th on 19 April 2025
Jess Waddington	33	Dog walker	31st-35th	Balance an egg on a drinks tray with only your index finger	Eliminated 28th on 19 April 2025
Omali Hutson	34	Personal trainer	31st-35th	Balance an egg on a drinks tray with only your index finger	Eliminated 28th on 19 April 2025
Stephen Roberts	40	Railway engineer	31st-35th	Balance an egg on a drinks tray with only your index finger	Eliminated 28th on 19 April 2025
Yasmin Forbes	31	Model	31st-35th	Balance an egg on a drinks tray with only your index finger	Eliminated 28th on 19 April 2025
Lydia Wilby	19	Student	30th	Knock down a skittle with a wheelie bin	Eliminated 29th on 19 April 2025
Kieran Lyall	29	Carpenter	29th	Cut a rope at 13.7 metres	Eliminated 30th on 19 April 2025
Jay Slater	23	Retail manager	28th	Thread a drawstring through a pair of shorts and put them on	Eliminated 31st on 19 April 2025
Poonam Sharma	39	Banker	27th	Pop two balloons with a cactus	Eliminated 32nd on 19 April 2025
Karl Emanuelsson	46	Retreat officer	26th	Find a dummy from a jelly whilst blindfolded	Eliminated 33rd on 26 April 2025
Ashley Meredith	35	Teacher	21st-25th	Untangle yourself from your teammates	Eliminated 34th on 26 April 2025
Bella Tolman	33	Trading manager	21st-25th	Untangle yourself from your teammates	Eliminated 34th on 26 April 2025
Derek Benford	67	Retired police officer	21st-25th	Untangle yourself from your teammates	Eliminated 34th on 26 April 2025
Duval Jefferson	24	Dancer	21st-25th	Untangle yourself from your teammates	Eliminated 34th on 26 April 2025
Fred Obasa	29	CX specialist	21st-25th	Untangle yourself from your teammates	Eliminated 34th on 26 April 2025
Finlay McKillop	25	Musical theatre performer	20th	Use a ball in a pouch to roll a can across the studio floor	Eliminated 35th on 26 April 2025
Ashton Victor	30	Creative consultant	19th	Extinguish a candle flame using a syringe of water	Eliminated 36th on 26 April 2025
Dani B	33	Influencer	18th	Catch a potato on a fork	Eliminated 37th on 26 April 2025
Robin Nixon	63	Technical author	17th	Melt ice and blow a whistle	Eliminated 38th on 26 April 2025
Nikki Sneddon	45	Dance teacher	16th	Balance a seesaw	Eliminated 39th on 3 May 2025
Courtney Kennon	19	Student; Twin sister of Georgia K	15th	Lick a gobstopper and fit it into a bottle	Eliminated 40th on 3 May 2025
Sarah Plummer	36	Nursery manager	14th	Sleeping bag race across the studio floor	Eliminated 41st on 3 May 2025
Clinton	22	Student	13th	Cut an onion into 42 rings	Eliminated 42nd on 3 May 2025
Nicola King	54	Hairdresser	11th-12th	Transfer 50 metres of rope from one partner to the other	Eliminated 43rd on 3 May 2025
Ryan Hamlet	32	Estate agent	11th-12th	Transfer 50 metres of rope from one partner to the other	Eliminated 43rd on 3 May 2025
Huseyin Ahmet	24	Tattoo artist	10th	Fold and pack up a collapsible tent	Eliminated 44th on 3 May 2025
Charlie Jones	23	Flight attendant	9th	Push a vacuum cleaner onto a target	Eliminated 45th on 3 May 2025
David Smith	40	Hairdresser	8th	Catch a paper butterfly in a net	Eliminated 46th on 10 May 2025
Libby Wood	19	Sales	7th	Stack boxes	Eliminated 47th on 10 May 2025
Grant Gibbs	42	Fitness coach	6th	Sharpen two bicolour pencils	Eliminated 48th on 10 May 2025
Nancy Pearce	43	Travel consultant	5th	Transfer a ping-pong ball on a hairdryer through an obstacle course	Eliminated 49th on 10 May 2025
Joan Pons Laplana	49	Senior nurse	4th	Flip a traffic cone and land it onto another	Eliminated 50th on 10 May 2025
Jason Howard	42	Chef	3rd	Perform a three-point-turn in a golf buggy	Third place on 10 May 2025
William Joel	22	Student	2nd	Knock down 12 tin cans with a swinging ball	Runner-up on 10 May 2025
Caitlin Lawlor	25	Financial crime associate	1st	Knock down 12 tin cans with a swinging ball	Winner on 10 May 2025

== Results ==
=== Episode 1 (100 to 82) ===
- Games played (7):
1. Game 1: Sit on an exercise ball
  1. (Last three contestants: Charlie H vs Edward vs Paul S)
  2. (Last two contestants: Charlie H vs Edward)
2. Game 2: Slinky on your forehead
  1. (Last three contestants: Dilan vs Janet vs Louis)
  2. (Last two contestants: Dilan vs Janet)
3. Game 3: Balance a drinks can at a 45-degree angle
  1. (Last two contestants: Calvin vs Freddie)
4. Game 4: Ping-pong ball on a spoon in your mouth (Note: The first person/team to fail this game was eliminated.)
  1. (First to drop their ball: Caroline)
5. Game 5: Drainpipe bowling
  1. (First four teams):
    1. (Last four teams: Blue Team #1 vs Orange Team #1 vs Purple Team #1 vs Pink Team #1)
    2. (Last three teams: Blue Team #1 vs Orange Team #1 vs Purple Team #1)
    3. (Last two teams: Orange Team #1 vs Purple Team #1)
  2. (Second four teams):
    1. (Last four teams: Blue Team #2 vs Orange Team #2 vs Purple Team #2 vs Pink Team #2)
    2. (Last three teams: Orange Team #2 vs Purple Team #2 vs Pink Team #2)
    3. (Last two teams: Orange Team #2 vs Pink Team #2)
  3. (Elimination head-to-head):
    1. (Last two teams: Pink Team vs Purple Team) (Note: The team colours were switched.)
6. Game 6: Defrost a frozen T-shirt
  1. (Last four contestants: Bianca vs Janet vs Les vs Louis)
  2. (Last three contestants: Bianca vs Janet vs Les)
  3. (Last two contestants: Bianca vs Les)
  4. (Contestant withdrew: Lisa)
7. Game 7: Extract a £2 coin from a piggy bank
  1. (Last three contestants: Poonam vs Stephen vs Yae)
  2. (Last two contestants: Stephen vs Yae)
  3. (Contestants withdrew: Jodie and Michael)

=== Episode 2 (82 to 63) ===
- Games played (7):
1. Game 8: Guess the weight of a llama
  1. (Last two contestants: Freddie vs Janet)
2. Game 9: Fit sticky tape into a lunchbox
  1. (Last three contestants: Amy vs Finlay vs Tony)
  2. (Last two contestants: Finlay vs Tony)
3. Game 10: Retract a measuring tape between two lines
  1. (Last three contestants: Mike vs Paul M vs Surabhi)
  2. (Last two contestants: Paul M vs Surabhi)
4. Game 11: Loop six penne pasta pieces onto spaghetti in your mouth
  1. (Last three contestants: Derek vs Lewis vs Paul S)
  2. (Last two contestants: Lewis vs Paul S)
5. Game 12: Domino rally
  1. (Last six teams: Pink Team vs Red Team vs Purple Team vs Yellow Team vs Blue Team vs Orange Team)
  2. (Last five teams: Red Team vs Purple Team vs Yellow Team vs Blue Team vs Orange Team)
  3. (Last four teams: Purple Team vs Yellow Team vs Blue Team vs Orange Team)
  4. (Last three teams: Purple Team vs Yellow Team vs Blue Team)
  5. (Last two teams: Purple Team vs Yellow Team)
6. Game 13: Hold a flower in secateurs at shoulder height
  1. (First to cut their flower: Paul O)
7. Game 14: Giant volleyball match
  1. (First round):
    1. (Last two teams: Red Team vs Blue Team)
  2. (Second round):
    1. (Last two teams: Red Team vs Blue Team)
  3. (Third round):
    1. (Last two teams: Red Team vs Blue Team)
  4. (Fourth round):
    1. (Last two teams: Red Team vs Blue Team)
  5. (Fifth round):
    1. (Last two teams: Red Team vs Blue Team)
  6. (Final round)
    1. (Last two contestants: Katy vs Stephen)

=== Episode 3 (63 to 46) ===
- Games played (6):
1. Game 15: Knock off a balloon with rubber bands
  1. (Last four contestants: Dexter vs Freddie vs Jess vs Nicola)
  2. (Last three contestants: Dexter vs Freddie vs Jess)
  3. (Last two contestants: Dexter vs Freddie)
2. Game 16: Stack eleven loose nails on top of another nail
  1. (Last four contestants: Ali vs Lewis vs Nicola vs Shane)
  2. (Last three contestants: Ali vs Lewis vs Nicola)
  3. (Last two contestants: Ali vs Lewis)
3. Game 17: Make and throw a paper plane
  1. (Shortest distance: Jeff)
4. Game 18: Flip pancakes down the line
  1. (Last five teams: Blue Team vs Orange Team vs Yellow Team vs Red Team vs Purple Team)
  2. (Last four teams: Blue Team vs Orange Team vs Yellow Team vs Red Team)
  3. (Last three teams: Blue Team vs Orange Team vs Red Team)
  4. (Last two teams: Blue Team vs Orange Team)
5. Game 19: Guess the number of peas
  1. (Last two contestants: Ashton vs Bianca)
6. Game 20: Light three tealight candles and transfer them to tealight holders
  1. (Last four contestants: Courtney vs Duval vs Joan vs Lewis)
  2. (Last three contestants: Duval vs Joan vs Lewis)
  3. (Last two contestants: Duval vs Lewis)

=== Episode 4 (46 to 36) ===
- Games played (6):
1. Game 21: Find the T-shirt with your name on it
  1. (Last four contestants: Amy vs Duval vs Nikki vs Will M)
  2. (Last three contestants: Duval vs Nikki vs Will M)
  3. (Last two contestants: Nikki vs Will M)
2. Game 22: Find your teammates with the same instruments whilst blindfolded
  1. (Last four teams: Team Cowbells vs Team Harmonicas vs Team Rubber Chickens vs Team Tambourines)
  2. (Last three teams: Team Cowbells vs Team Harmonicas vs Team Rubber Chickens)
  3. (Last two teams: Team Cowbells vs Team Harmonicas)
3. Game 23: Peel a potato to produce as long a peel as possible
  1. (Last two contestants: Amy vs Mia)
4. Game 24: Push off a scooter without stepping off
  1. (Loser of first heat: Duval)
  2. (Loser of second heat: Joan)
  3. (Loser of third heat: Amir)
  4. (Last three contestants: Amir vs Duval vs Joan)
  5. (Last two contestants: Amir vs Duval)
5. Game 25: Bounce a pencil into a pot
  1. (Last four contestants: Charlie J vs Kieran L vs Lydia vs Mia)
  2. (Last three contestants: Charlie J vs Kieran L vs Mia)
  3. (Last two contestants: Kieran L vs Mia)
6. Game 26: Fire a champagne cork
  1. (Shortest distance: Dexter)

=== Episode 5 (36 to 26) ===
- Games played (6):
1. Game 27: Guess the decade of pop songs
  1. (Last four contestants: Jake vs Kieran L vs Poonam vs Robin)
2. Game 28: Balance an egg on a drinks tray with only your index finger
  1. (First team to drop their egg: Purple Team)
3. Game 29: Knock down an inflatable skittle with a wheelie bin
  1. (Last four contestants: Huseyin vs Lydia vs Sarah vs William)
  2. (Last two contestants: Lydia vs Sarah)
4. Game 30: Cut a rope at 13.7 metres
  1. (Last two contestants: Charlie J vs Kieran L)
5. Game 31: Thread a drawstring through a pair of shorts and put them on
  1. (Last four contestants: Ashton vs Duval vs Jay vs Poonam)
  2. (Last three contestants: Ashton vs Duval vs Jay)
  3. (Last two contestants: Duval vs Jay)
6. Game 32: Pop two balloons with a cactus
  1. (Last four contestants: Derek vs Nikki vs Poonam vs Sarah)
  2. (Last three contestants: Derek vs Poonam vs Sarah)
  3. (Last two contestants: Derek vs Poonam)

=== Episode 6 (26 to 16) ===
- Games played (6):
1. Game 33: Find a dummy from a jelly whilst blindfolded
  1. (Last four contestants: Derek vs Karl vs Libby vs Sarah)
  2. (Last three contestants: Derek vs Karl vs Sarah)
  3. (Last two contestants: Karl vs Sarah)
2. Game 34: Untangle yourself from your teammates
  1. (Last five teams: Orange Team vs Blue Team vs Red Team vs Yellow Team vs Pink Team)
  2. (Last four teams: Orange Team vs Blue Team vs Red Team vs Pink Team)
  3. (Last three teams: Blue Team vs Red Team vs Pink Team)
  4. (Last two teams: Blue Team vs Red Team)
3. Game 35: Roll a can using a ball in a pouch
  1. (Last four contestants: Clinton vs Finlay vs Robin vs Sarah)
  2. (Last three contestants: Clinton vs Finlay vs Robin)
  3. (Last two contestants: Finlay vs Robin) (Note: Finlay initially finished ahead of Robin, but as he broke the rules of the game (he kicked his can with his knee, which was not allowed), he was sent back to the starting line, while Robin restarted the game from his position when Finlay committed the rule break. Finlay would kick his can again on the restart.)
4. Game 36: Extinguish a candle flame using a syringe of water
  1. (Last four contestants: Ashton vs Nikki vs Ryan vs William)
  2. (Last three contestants: Ashton vs Nikki vs Ryan)
  3. (Last two contestants: Ashton vs Ryan)
5. Game 37: Catch a potato on a fork
  1. (Last four pairs: Courtney and David vs Dani B and Nancy vs Jason and Sarah vs Nicola and Nikki)
  2. (Last three pairs: Courtney and David vs Dani B and Nancy vs Nicola and Nikki)
  3. (Last two pairs: Dani B and Nancy vs Nicola and Nikki)
  4. (Last two contestants: Dani B vs Nancy) (Note: When only one pair remained, that pair was split up and would have to select an already-safe contestant for the bottom two. Dani B chose Huseyin, while Nancy chose Grant for the final.)
6. Game 38: Melt ice and blow a whistle
  1. (Last three contestants: David vs Nicola vs Robin)
  2. (Last two contestants: Nicola vs Robin)

=== Episode 7 (16 to 8) ===
- Games played (7):
1. Game 39: Balance a seesaw
  1. (First round):
    1. (Last two teams: Blue Team vs Orange Team)
  2. (Second round):
    1. (Last two teams: Blue Team vs Orange Team)
  3. (Third round):
    1. (Last two teams: Blue Team vs Orange Team)
  4. (Final round):
    1. (Last two contestants: Nancy vs Nikki)
2. Game 40: Lick a gobstopper and fit it into a bottle
  1. (Last four contestants: Courtney vs Jason vs Sarah vs William)
  2. (Last three contestants: Courtney vs Jason vs Sarah)
  3. (Last two contestants: Courtney vs Jason)
3. Game 41: Sleeping bag race across the studio floor
  1. (Last two contestants: Nicola vs Sarah)
4. Game 42: Cut an onion into 42 rings and place them into a grid
  1. (Last five contestants: Charlie J vs Clinton vs David vs Libby vs Nicola)
  2. (Last four contestants: Charlie J vs Clinton vs David vs Libby)
  3. (Last three contestants: Charlie J vs Clinton vs Libby)
  4. (Last two contestants: Charlie J vs Clinton)
5. Game 43: Transfer 50 metres of rope from one partner to the other
  1. (Last six pairs: Caitlin and David vs Charlie J vs Huseyin vs Grant and Nancy vs Jason and Joan vs Libby and William vs Nicola and Ryan)
  2. (Last five pairs: Caitlin and David vs Charlie J and Huseyin vs Grant and Nancy vs Libby and William vs Nicola and Ryan)
  3. (Last four pairs: Caitlin and David vs Charlie J and Huseyin vs Libby and William vs Nicola and Ryan)
  4. (Last three pairs: Caitlin and David vs Libby and William vs Nicola and Ryan)
  5. (Last two pairs: Libby and William vs Nicola and Ryan)
6. Game 44: Fold and pack up a collapsible tent
  1. (Last four contestants: Charlie J vs Grant vs Huseyin vs Nancy)
  2. (Last three contestants: Charlie J vs Huseyin vs Nancy)
  3. (Last two contestants: Huseyin vs Nancy)
7. Game 45: Push a vacuum cleaner onto a target
  1. (Last nine contestants: Caitlin vs Charlie J vs David vs Grant vs Jason vs Joan vs Libby vs Nancy vs William)
  2. (Last eight contestants: Caitlin vs Charlie J vs David vs Grant vs Jason vs Joan vs Libby vs Nancy)
  3. (Last seven contestants: Caitlin vs Charlie J vs David vs Grant vs Jason vs Libby vs Nancy)
  4. (Last six contestants: Caitlin vs Charlie J vs Grant vs Jason vs Libby vs Nancy)
  5. (Last five contestants: Caitlin vs Charlie J vs Jason vs Libby vs Nancy)
  6. (Last four contestants: Caitlin vs Charlie J vs Jason vs Libby)
  7. (Last three contestants: Charlie J vs Jason vs Libby)
  8. (Last two contestants: Charlie J vs Libby)

=== Episode 8 (8 to 1) ===
- Games played (7):
1. Game 46: Catch a paper butterfly in a net
  1. (Last eight contestants: Caitlin vs David vs Grant vs Jason vs Joan vs Libby vs Nancy vs William)
  2. (Last seven contestants: David vs Grant vs Jason vs Joan vs Libby vs Nancy vs William)
  3. (Last six contestants: David vs Grant vs Jason vs Libby vs Nancy vs William)
  4. (Last five contestants: David vs Grant vs Jason vs Nancy vs William)
  5. (Last four contestants: David vs Grant vs Nancy vs William)
  6. (Last three contestants: David vs Grant vs Nancy)
  7. (Last two contestants: David vs Nancy)
2. Game 47: Stack boxes
  1. (Last seven contestants: Caitlin vs Grant vs Jason vs Joan vs Libby vs Nancy vs William)
  2. (Last four contestants: Joan vs Libby vs Nancy vs William)
3. Game 48: Sharpen two bicolour pencils
  1. (Last six contestants: Caitlin vs Grant vs Jason vs Joan vs Nancy vs William)
  2. (Last five contestants: Grant vs Jason vs Joan vs Nancy vs William)
  3. (Last four contestants: Grant vs Joan vs Nancy vs William)
  4. (Last three contestants: Grant vs Nancy vs William)
  5. (Last two contestants: Grant vs William)
4. Game 49: Transfer a ping-pong ball on a hairdryer through an obstacle course
  1. (Last five contestants: Caitlin vs Jason vs Joan vs Nancy vs William)
  2. (Last four contestants: Caitlin vs Joan vs Nancy vs William)
  3. (Last three contestants: Caitlin vs Joan vs Nancy)
  4. (Last two contestants: Joan vs Nancy)
5. Game 50: Flip a traffic cone and land it onto another
  1. (Last four contestants: Caitlin vs Jason vs Joan vs William)
  2. (Last three contestants: Caitlin vs Joan vs William)
  3. (Last two contestants: Joan vs William)
6. Game 51: Perform a three-point turn in a golf buggy
  1. (Last three contestants: Caitlin vs Jason vs William)
  2. (Last two contestants: Caitlin vs Jason)
7. Game 52: Knock down 12 cans with a swinging ball
  1. (Last two contestants: Caitlin vs William)
    1. (Final score: Caitlin 12-9 William)

== Series overview ==
Series	Episodes	Premiere	Finale
1	8	22 March 2025	10 May 2025

== See also ==
- 99 to Beat
