= Love Is Blind: Brazil season 5 =

2025 Brazilian reality TV series

Love Is Blind: Brazil
- Season 5
- Presented by: Camila Queiroz; Klebber Toledo
- No. of episodes: 13

Release
- Original network: Netflix
- Original release: September 10 – September 24, 2025

Season chronology
- ← Previous; Season 4

The fifth season of Love Is Blind: Brazil (Portuguese: Casamento às Cegas: Brasil) premiered on Netflix on September 10, 2025, as part of a three-week event. Camila Queiroz and Klebber Toledo returned as hosts.

As part of a twist, the season's cast consisted exclusively of participants over the age of 50. Consequently, the season was renamed Love Is Blind Brazil: Never Too Late.

This season introduced celebrities reacting to recorded episodes live from the booths, a worldwide first for the show's format. The paired celebrities, previously unacquainted, observed the contestants from behind the scenes and interacted with one another. The pairs were Luana Piovani and Rafa Chalub; Marcelo Adnet and Júlia Rabello; Camilla de Lucas and Chico Barney; and Regina Volpato and Yuri Marçal.

== Season summary ==
Couples	Married	Still together	Relationship notes
Aidê and Ed	Yes	No	Aidê and Ed got married. They later separated due to personality conflicts, frequent shouting, Ed's dislike of "relationship talks" and Aidê's need for respect and companionship.
Nívia and Ricardo	No	No	They did not get married after both of them said no at the altar. Both parties read their vows before giving their answers, and Ricardo remarked that some things meant to last forever do not endure as one hopes.
Lucielma and Mario	No	No	They did not get married as Lucielma ran from her wedding, convinced Mario would reject her. He condemned her escape, discarded her letter and blocked her after repeated attempts to contact him. At the reunion, she admitted feeling rejected and vowed to seek therapy.
Lica and Leonardo	No	No	They split up after Lica left a letter admitting she might have chosen wrong, as she was still drawn to Rivo, and that their relationship lacked affection and harmony.
Silvia and Rivo	No	No	They split up shortly after the post-pod honeymoons because Rivo longer felt attracted to Silvia, while she longed for affection and intimacy.

== Participants ==
Name	Age	Occupation	Hometown	Relationship Status
Aidê Torres Torres	60	Audience coordinator	São Paulo	Married, split after the wedding
Edmilson "Ed" Assis	65	Event producer	Rio de Janeiro	Married, split after the wedding
Nívia Gälego	57	Fashion marketing	São Paulo	Split at the wedding
Ricardo Zanardo	53	Cosmetics entrepreneur	Montevideo	Split at the wedding
Lucielma Cardeal	51	Logistics technician	São Bernardo do Campo	Split at the wedding
Mario Roberto	50	Entrepreneur	Barretos	Split at the wedding
Eliane "Lica" Neri	51	Business administrator	São Bernardo do Campo	Split before the wedding
Leonardo Vicentini	50	Dentist	Belo Horizonte	Split before the wedding
Silvia Malanzuki	62	Actress	São Paulo	Split before the wedding
Rivo Abreu	67	Foreign exchange manager	Rio de Janeiro	Split before the wedding
Luciana Rodriguez	50	Digital marketing manager	São Paulo	Split after first meeting
Mario Sérgio	67	Publicist	São José dos Campos	Split after first meeting
Ana Lúcia Custódio	60	Real estate broker	São Paulo	Not engaged
Claudia Chaves	61	Senior model	São Paulo	Not engaged
Claudio Hott	53	Financial consultant	Volta Redonda	Not engaged
Fabiana Checchia	52	Lawyer	São Paulo	Not engaged
Fábio Santos	53	Lawyer	São Paulo	Not engaged
Fátima Taffo	70	Retired	São Paulo	Not engaged
Geraldo Duarte	57	App driver	São Paulo	Not engaged
Gustavo Cardoso	54	Body therapist	São Paulo	Not engaged
Jacy Borges	61	Retired	Minas Gerais	Not engaged
Jobert Costa	55	Publicist	Salto	Not engaged
Judicael Renouard	54	Business administrator	Le Mans	Not engaged
Marcelo Ivanaskas	55	Engineer	São Paulo	Not engaged
Maria Luiza "Malu" Brufatto	63	Entrepreneur	Rio Grande do Sul	Not engaged
Roseli Silva	55	Nurse	São Paulo	Not engaged
Samuel Freiria	51	Visual artist	Franca	Not engaged
Tânia Felix	53	Entrepreneur	Votorantim	Not engaged
Ustinelli Arone	54	Personal trainer	São Paulo	Not engaged
Wagner da Silva	58	3D Printing designer	São Paulo	Not engaged

== Episodes ==
No. overall	No. in season	Title	Original release date
Week 1
45	1	"It's Never Too Late for Love"	September 10, 2025
46	2	"Will You Join Me?"	September 10, 2025
47	3	"It Takes a Long Time to Become Young"	September 10, 2025
48	4	"Love Like in the Movies"	September 10, 2025
49	5	"Reactions: Never Too Late"	September 10, 2025
Week 2
50	6	"A Forever Honeymoon?"	September 17, 2025
51	7	"One Day at a Time"	September 17, 2025
52	8	"Go Easy on Me"	September 17, 2025
53	9	"Dress Rehearsal"	September 17, 2025
54	10	"Reactions: Living Together"	September 17, 2025
Week 3
55	11	"Farewell, Single Life!"	September 24, 2025
56	12	"Is Love Really Blind?"	September 24, 2025
57	13	"Reactions: Is Love Really Blind?"	September 24, 2025

== Production ==
=== Filming ===
Filming began in São Paulo in October 2024 and lasted 39 days up until the weddings. After the five newly engaged couples left the pods, filming took place at UXUA Casa Hotel & Spa in Trancoso, Porto Seguro, Bahia, where all the couples went on a retreat. Then, the relationships that made it through the retreat moved in together in an apartment complex in São Paulo, where they spent the rest of the time filming up until the weddings in December 2024.

=== Stalking allegations ===
Luciana Rodriguez filed a police report against fellow cast member Lucielma Cardeal, alleging that she was being stalked. During a livestream on social media, Luciana stated that Lucielma had contacted her several times using different telephone numbers. According to Luciana, the behavior was similar to what Lucielma had previously displayed toward Mario Roberto, her former fiancé on the show, whom she admitted to having pursued after ending their engagement.

== Accolades ==
Year	Award	Category	Result
2026	Troféu Imprensa	Best Reality Show	Nominated
