= Verdades Secretas =

Brazilian telenovela by Walcyr Carrasco

- Title card for the first season.
- Genre: Drama
- Created by: Walcyr Carrasco
- Written by: Walcyr Carrasco; Maria Elisa Berredo; Bruno Lima Penido; Márcio Haiduck; Nelson Nadotti; Vinícius Vianna
- Directed by: Mauro Mendonça Filho (season 1); Amora Mautner (season 2)
- Starring: Camila Queiroz; Rodrigo Lombardi; Drica Moraes; Marieta Severo; Reynaldo Gianecchini; Grazi Massafera; Agatha Moreira; Rainer Cadete; Guilhermina Guinle; Gabriel Leone; João Vítor Silva; Rômulo Estrela; Gabriel Braga Nunes; Maria de Medeiros; Deborah Evelyn; Ícaro Silva; Sérgio Guizé; Júlia Byrro
- Opening theme: "Angel" by Massive Attack (season 1); "Two Weeks" by FKA Twigs (season 2)
- Composer: João Paulo Mendonça
- Country of origin: Brazil
- Original language: Portuguese
- No. of seasons: 2
- No. of episodes: 114 (list of episodes)

Production
- Production location: São Paulo
- Cinematography: Mauro Pinheiro Jr.; Pablo Baião; André Horta
- Editors: André Leite; Valéria de Barros; Cris Carneiro; Diogo Ribeiro; Fabrício Ferreira
- Camera setup: Single-camera setup
- Running time: 20–71 minutes
- Production company: Estúdios Globo

Original release
- Network: TV Globo
- Release: 8 June – 25 September 2015
- Network: Globoplay
- Release: 20 October – 17 December 2021

Related
- Verdades Secretas.doc

Verdades Secretas (English: Hidden Truths) is a Brazilian telenovela created by Walcyr Carrasco and directed by Mauro Mendonça Filho and Amora Mautner. Produced and broadcast by Rede Globo, it originally aired from 8 June 2015 to 25 September 2015. The second season was broadcast by Globo streaming service, Globoplay from 20 October 2021 to 17 December 2021.

The first season stars Camila Queiroz, Rodrigo Lombardi, Drica Moraes, Marieta Severo, Reynaldo Gianecchini, Grazi Massafera, Agatha Moreira, and Rainer Cadete. While Rômulo Estrela, Gabriel Braga Nunes, Maria de Medeiros, Deborah Evelyn, Ícaro Silva, Sérgio Guizé, and Júlia Byrro join the main cast for the second season.

In October 2021, the telenovela was renewed for a third season, which was scheduled to premiere in 2023. In May 2022, Globo shelved plans of producing the third season, ending the show's run after two seasons.

In 2015, the first season won the International Emmy Award for Best Telenovela.

== Plot ==
=== Season 1 (2015) ===
Arlete (Camila Queiroz) is a beautiful young girl full of dreams. She arrives in São Paulo willing to become a model, but she ends up working as a luxury prostitute under the stage name "Angel". Hit by the needs that life imposes, Angel cannot overcome the traps disguised as opportunities, allowing herself to be taken by an obscure reality, which goes far beyond the catwalks. This is when Alex (Rodrigo Lombardi), a powerful, rich, seductive, and experienced man, comes into her life. They eventually end up being in love with each other as they start a relationship. Aiming to be even closer to Angel, Alex fakes his love towards Angel's mother, Carolina (Drica Moraes), and marries her. Later on, Carolina learns about Angel and Alex's affair and commits suicide in disgust. In order to avenge her mother's death, Angel kills Alex and throws his corpse into the sea. She later marries Guilherme (Gabriel Leone), her old boyfriend from the modeling agency.

=== Season 2 (2021) ===
Years after Alex's death, Guilherme dies in a mysterious accident. With no money and an ill son left to raise, Angel decides to start modeling again. Giovanna (Agatha Moreira), Alex's daughter, returns from Paris, believing that Angel murdered both Guilherme and her father, whose corpse was never found. In order to prove Alex's death and take possession of her family's inheritance, Giovanna is willing to do anything to find evidence that proves that Angel killed her father. She hires Cristiano (Rômulo Estrela), a charming private investigator, with whom she gets involved with. Aiming to get closer to Angel and be able to investigate her, Cristiano decides to pose as a model and infiltrate the world of fashion; however, once he meets Angel, he ends up falling in love with her.

== Cast ==
=== Main ===
- Camila Queiroz as Arlete "Angel" Brito Gomes
- Rodrigo Lombardi as Alexandre "Alex" Ticiano (season 1; guest season 2)
- Drica Moraes as Carolina Brito (season 1)
- Marieta Severo as Fanny Richard / Rita de Cássia (season 1)
- Reynaldo Gianecchini as Anthony Mariano (season 1)
- Grazi Massafera as Larissa Ramos (season 1)
- Agatha Moreira as Giovanna "Kika" Lovatelli Ticiano
- Rainer Cadete as Visky
- Guilhermina Guinle as Pia Lovatelli (season 1; recurring season 2)
- Gabriel Leone as Guilherme Lovatelli (season 1; guest season 2)
- João Vítor Silva as Bruno Lovatelli Ticiano (season 2; recurring season 1)
- Rômulo Estrela as Cristiano Valença (season 2)
- Gabriel Braga Nunes as Percival "Percy" Biancchini (season 2)
- Maria de Medeiros as Blanche LaBelle (season 2)
- Deborah Evelyn as Betty (season 2)
- Ícaro Silva as Joseph (season 2)
- Sérgio Guizé as Ariel Nolasco (season 2)
- Júlia Byrro as Lara "Lua" Cunha (season 2)

=== Recurring ===
==== Introduced in season one ====
- Dida Camero as Lourdes "Lourdeca" Lima
- Adriano Toloza as Igor Lovatelli
- Ana Lúcia Torre as Hilda Brito (season 1)
- Bel Kutner as Darlene Brito (season 1)
- Eva Wilma as Fábia Mariano (season 1)
- Genézio de Barros as Oswaldo Moreira (season 1)
- Felipe Carolis as Sam Nunes (season 1)
- Alessandra Ambrósio as Samia (season 1)
- Yasmin Brunet as Stephanie Prates (season 1)
- Jessica Córes as Lyris Monteiro (season 1)
- Rhaisa Batista as Mayra Chagas (season 1)
- Flávio Tolezani as Roy (season 1)
- Fernando Eiras as Maurice Argent (season 1)
- Tarcísio Filho as Rogério Gomes (season 1)
- Laryssa Dias as Viviane Gomes (season 1)
- Mouhamed Harfouch as Everaldo Ramirez (season 1)
- Gláucio Gomes as Robério Sá (season 1)
- Raphael Sander as Léo (season 1)
- Felipe Hintze as Eziel (season 1)
- Bella Piero as Nina (season 1)
- Pedro Gabriel Tonini as Edgard (season 1)
- Nathália Rodrigues as Estela (season 1)
- Ana Barroso as Divanilda Ramos (season 1)
- Mariana Molina as Patrícia (season 1)
- Christian Villegas as Daniel de Freitas (season 1)
- Giuliano Lafayette as Caco (season 1)
- Raphael Ghanem as Dudu (season 1)
- Sylbeth Soriano as Leidiana (season 1)
- Fernanda Heras as Eunice (season 1)
- João Cunha as Joel Aguiar (season 1)
- Maria Eduarda Miliante as Yasmin Gomes (season 1)
- Yaçanã Martins as Sabina (season 1)
- Werles Pajero as Raulino (season 1)

==== Introduced in season two ====
- Bernardo Lessa as Fabrício (season 2)
- Luciana Fernandes as Nalva (season 2)
- Maria Luísa Mendonça as Araídes Cunha (season 2)
- Erika Januza as Laila Nolasco (season 2)
- Rhay Polster as Chiara (season 2)
- Paula Burlamaqui as Aline (season 2)
- Gabriel Vieira as Tadeu (season 2)
- Mayara Russi as Vitória (season 2)
- Iza Moreira as Giulia (season 2)
- Clara Choveaux as Tânia (season 2)
- Kelner Macêdo as Mark (season 2)
- Rodrigo Pandolfo as Benjamin "Benji" Nunes (season 2)
- Johnny Massaro as Giotto (season 2)
- Julia Stockler as Irina (season 2)
- Celso Frateschi as Lorenzo (season 2)
- Bruno Montaleone as Matheus (season 2)
- Zezé Polessa as Berta (season 2)
- Jonathan Azevedo as Eurípedes (season 2)
- Aline Borges as Thaís (season 2)
- Eduardo Reyes as Edney (season 2)
- Julio Machado as Nicolau (season 2)
- Daniel Andrade as Lúcio DeSantis (season 2)
- Giovana Echeverria as Lisa (season 2)
- Malu Ogata as Reiko (season 2)
- Ângelo Antônio as Visky's father (season 2)

=== Guest stars ===
==== Introduced in season one ====
- Kíria Malheiros as young Carolina Brito (season 1)
- Camila Mayrink as Bel (season 1)
- Maurício Branco as Dante (season 1)
- Fernanda Tavares as herself (season 1)
- Ana Paula Botelho as Chambermaid (season 1)
- Alexia Dechamps as Lídice (season 1)
- Álamo Facó as Emanoel (season 1)
- Martha Meola as Silvia (season 1)
- Giulio Lopes as Renato (season 1)

==== Introduced in season two ====
- Hugo Gloss as himself (season 2)

== Episodes ==
Season	Episodes	Originally released		
Season	Episodes	First released	Last released	Network
1	64	8 June 2015	25 September 2015	TV Globo
2	50	20 October 2021	17 December 2021	Globoplay

== Reception ==
In Brazil, the telenovela was broadcast in the 11:00 pm time slot and recorded an average 43% share and more than 18 million viewers. It was one of the most successful telenovelas of TV Globo in recent times, having achieved a viewership rating of 19.81 (20) points, the highest, despite its 11 pm timeslot. It was also widely commented on Twitter, while being broadcast, generating more than three million comments. The #verdadessecretas (original title of the telenovela) hashtag was the most used, with 2,817,827 mentions. In second place was #angel, the name young Arlete uses after entering into the fashion world. The telenovela's finale garnered more than one million mentions.

Verdades Secretas received praise from critics, and was prized as Best Telenovela at the 44th International Emmy Awards, becoming the fifth telenovela of TV Globo to win the category in a row. The telenovela also received nomination for Best Actress for Grazi Massafera performance.

=== Ratings ===
Season	Timeslot	Episodes	First aired		Last aired		Television season	Average viewers (in points)
Season	Timeslot	Episodes	Date	Viewers (in points)	Date	Viewers (in points)	Television season	Average viewers (in points)
1	Monday 11:00 p.m. Tuesday 11:00 p.m. Thursday 11:00 p.m. Friday 11:00 p.m.	64	8 June 2015	22.9	25 September 2015	26.5	2015	19.81

On a consolidated basis, the debut of the plot registered 22.9 (23) points, same as the 9 pm telenovela Babilônia. The next day scored 20.2 points. In its third episode, Verdades Secretas scored 19 points. Record viewership took place on 22 June, when it recorded 24 rating points in Greater São Paulo. On 6 July, the show peaked at 30 points rating, closing with average of 26 (25.5) that week. In its last week it hit a record audience on 21 July with 27 points almost surpassing the telenovela A Regra do Jogo. Sometimes higher viewer ratings than the Jornal Nacional, as on 27 July, when the plot registered an average of 25 points against 24 of the newspaper.

In its penultimate episode, the telenovela aired from 11:30 pm to 12:37 am, despite being displayed later time than schedule, it scored average 24.3 points. On the last episode scored 27 points, its highest ratings since its debut.

=== Awards and nominations ===
Year	Award	Category	Nominated	Result
2015	Prêmio Extra de Televisão	Best Telenovela	Walcyr Carrasco	Won
2015	Prêmio Extra de Televisão	Best Actor	Rodrigo Lombardi	Won
2015	Prêmio Extra de Televisão	Best Actress	Marieta Severo	Won
2015	Prêmio Extra de Televisão	Best Supporting Actor	Rainer Cadete	Won
2015	Prêmio Extra de Televisão	Best Supporting Actress	Grazi Massafera	Won
2015	Prêmio Extra de Televisão	Best Supporting Actress	Agata Moreira	Nominated
2015	Prêmio Extra de Televisão	Best New Actress	Camila Queiroz	Won
2015	Melhores do Ano	Best Actor of Telenovela	Rodrigo Lombardi	Nominated
2015	Melhores do Ano	Best Actress of Telenovela	Drica Moraes	Nominated
2015	Melhores do Ano	Best Supporting Actor	Rainer Cadete	Won
2015	Melhores do Ano	Best Supporting Actress	Grazi Massafera	Won
2015	Melhores do Ano	Best New Actress	Agata Moreira	Nominated
2015	Melhores do Ano	Best New Actress	Camila Queiroz	Nominated
2015	Melhores do Ano	Best New Actor	Gabriel Leone	Nominated
2015	Troféu APCA	Best Telenovela	Walcyr Carrasco	Won
2015	Troféu APCA	Best Actress	Drica Moraes	Nominated
2015	Troféu APCA	Best Actress	Grazi Massafera	Won
2015	Troféu APCA	Best Actress	Marieta Severo	Nominated
2015	Troféu APCA	Best Director	Mauro Mendonça Filho	Won
2016	International Emmy Awards	Best Telenovela	Walcyr Carrasco	Won
2016	International Emmy Awards	Best Actress	Grazi Massafera	Nominated

== DVD release ==
In June 2016, Globo Marcas released a DVD of an edited version of the telenovela, consisting of 25 episodes.

Verdades Secretas: Versão Sem Cortes
Set details
Special features
- 25 episodes
- 13-disc set
- 1500 minutes
- Portuguese (Dolby Digital 5.1 Surround)
- English SDH, English and Spanish subtitles
- Edited Version-Episodes

Release dates
Region 1
Region 4
-
20 June 2016
