= 99 to Beat =

Game show

- Created by: VRT, Primitives TV and De Chinezen
- Original work: Homo Universalis (Belgium)
- Years: 2018–present

Films and television
- Television series: 99 to Beat (independent international versions, see below)

Miscellaneous
- Genre: Game show
- First aired: 23 January 2018; 8 years ago

Official website
- Primitives TV

99 to Beat is a game show franchise that originated in Belgium and was first broadcast in January 2018. Versions have been developed in other countries. The game is based around an arena. The contestants compete with games played singularly, in couples or between teams.

The game progresses over the course of a season with the grand prize awarded to the player who is the last and wins the final game.

== Format ==
In the original Belgian version, 100 contestants compete over the course of a season. They go head-to-head in a series of ability challenges.

At the end of each challenge, the player who comes last has to leave the competition, which will add money to the jackpot, until just one contestant is left. The last contestant standing takes the jackpot home.

== International versions ==
Country	Title	Premiere date	Series				
Country	Title	Premiere date	Season	Year(s) aired	Winner	Presenter(s)	Broadcaster
Belgium (original format)	Homo Universalis Homo Universalis Ketnet	23 January 2018	1	2018	Guy Sterckx	Walter Grootaers (voice-over)	VRT 1 Ketnet
Belgium (original format)	Homo Universalis Homo Universalis Ketnet	23 January 2018	2	2019	Selattin Defevere	Walter Grootaers (voice-over)	VRT 1 Ketnet
Belgium (original format)	Homo Universalis Homo Universalis Ketnet	23 January 2018	3	2020	Preben	Walter Grootaers (voice-over)	VRT 1 Ketnet
Belgium (original format)	Homo Universalis Homo Universalis Ketnet	23 January 2018	4	Fall 2021	Wout Vanroose	Walter Grootaers (voice-over)	VRT 1 Ketnet
Belgium (original format)	Homo Universalis Homo Universalis Ketnet	23 January 2018	Ketnet 1	Fall 2021	Tibe	Walter Grootaers (voice-over)	VRT 1 Ketnet
Belgium (original format)	Homo Universalis Homo Universalis Ketnet	23 January 2018	Ketnet 2	Winter 2022	Sem	Walter Grootaers (voice-over)	VRT 1 Ketnet
Belgium (original format)	Homo Universalis Homo Universalis Ketnet	23 January 2018	5	Fall 2022	Jordi Joos	Walter Grootaers (voice-over)	VRT 1 Ketnet
Belgium (original format)	Homo Universalis Homo Universalis Ketnet	23 January 2018	Ketnet 3	Fall 2022	Ada	Walter Grootaers (voice-over)	VRT 1 Ketnet
Belgium (original format)	Homo Universalis Homo Universalis Ketnet	23 January 2018	Ketnet 4	2023	Maïlyne	Walter Grootaers (voice-over)	VRT 1 Ketnet
Belgium (original format)	Homo Universalis Homo Universalis Ketnet	23 January 2018	6	2024	William Van den Buys	Walter Grootaers (voice-over)	VRT 1 Ketnet
Belgium (original format)	Homo Universalis Homo Universalis Ketnet	23 January 2018	7	2026	Lode Aydemir	Steven Van Herreweghe (voice-over)	VRT 1 Ketnet
Brazil	Game dos 100	20 July 2025	1	2025	João Cavalcante	Rafa Brites, Felipe Andreoli and Márcia Fu	Record
France	99 à battre	7 August 2025	1	2025	Mohamed	Éric Antoine and Juju Fitcats	M6
Estonia	Parem kui 99	1 March 2026	1	2026	Rauno	Säm and Grete Kuld	TV3
Germany	99 – Eine:r schlägt sie alle! (2021–2023) 99 – Wer schlägt sie alle? (2024–present)	9 July 2021	1	2021	Rami	Florian Schmidt-Sommerfeld (season 1–present); Panagiota Petridou (season 5–present); Johanna Klum (season 1); Melissa Khalaj (season 2–4)	Sat.1
Germany	99 – Eine:r schlägt sie alle! (2021–2023) 99 – Wer schlägt sie alle? (2024–present)	9 July 2021	2	2022	Christine	Florian Schmidt-Sommerfeld (season 1–present); Panagiota Petridou (season 5–present); Johanna Klum (season 1); Melissa Khalaj (season 2–4)	Sat.1
Germany	99 – Eine:r schlägt sie alle! (2021–2023) 99 – Wer schlägt sie alle? (2024–present)	9 July 2021	3	Spring 2023	Andrea	Florian Schmidt-Sommerfeld (season 1–present); Panagiota Petridou (season 5–present); Johanna Klum (season 1); Melissa Khalaj (season 2–4)	Sat.1
Germany	99 – Eine:r schlägt sie alle! (2021–2023) 99 – Wer schlägt sie alle? (2024–present)	9 July 2021	4	Summer-Fall 2023	Jason	Florian Schmidt-Sommerfeld (season 1–present); Panagiota Petridou (season 5–present); Johanna Klum (season 1); Melissa Khalaj (season 2–4)	Sat.1
Germany	99 – Eine:r schlägt sie alle! (2021–2023) 99 – Wer schlägt sie alle? (2024–present)	9 July 2021	5	2024	Giusi	Florian Schmidt-Sommerfeld (season 1–present); Panagiota Petridou (season 5–present); Johanna Klum (season 1); Melissa Khalaj (season 2–4)	Sat.1
Germany	99 – Eine:r schlägt sie alle! (2021–2023) 99 – Wer schlägt sie alle? (2024–present)	9 July 2021	6	2025	Marius	Florian Schmidt-Sommerfeld (season 1–present); Panagiota Petridou (season 5–present); Johanna Klum (season 1); Melissa Khalaj (season 2–4)	Sat.1
Italy	99 da battere	10 February 2025	1	2025	Stanislao Zama	Max Giusti	Rai 2
Netherlands	De Alleskunner De Alleskunner VIPS De Alleskunner Duo's	1 February 2020	1	2020	Lilianne	Frank Lammers (voice-over)	SBS6
Netherlands	De Alleskunner De Alleskunner VIPS De Alleskunner Duo's	1 February 2020	2	Winter 2021	Melchior	Frank Lammers (voice-over)	SBS6
Netherlands	De Alleskunner De Alleskunner VIPS De Alleskunner Duo's	1 February 2020	VIPS 1	Summer 2021	Maxim Froger	Frank Lammers (voice-over)	SBS6
Netherlands	De Alleskunner De Alleskunner VIPS De Alleskunner Duo's	1 February 2020	3	Winter 2022	Yonni	Frank Lammers (voice-over)	SBS6
Netherlands	De Alleskunner De Alleskunner VIPS De Alleskunner Duo's	1 February 2020	VIPS 2	Spring 2022	Jessica Mendels	Frank Lammers (voice-over)	SBS6
Netherlands	De Alleskunner De Alleskunner VIPS De Alleskunner Duo's	1 February 2020	VIPS 3	Fall 2022	Mounir Toub	Frank Lammers (voice-over)	SBS6
Netherlands	De Alleskunner De Alleskunner VIPS De Alleskunner Duo's	1 February 2020	Christmas Special 2022	25 December 2022	Tommie Christiaan	Frank Lammers (voice-over)	SBS6
Netherlands	De Alleskunner De Alleskunner VIPS De Alleskunner Duo's	1 February 2020	4	Winter-Spring 2023	James	Frank Lammers (voice-over)	SBS6
Netherlands	De Alleskunner De Alleskunner VIPS De Alleskunner Duo's	1 February 2020	VIPS 4	Fall 2023	Ricky Lukassen	Frank Lammers (voice-over)	SBS6
Netherlands	De Alleskunner De Alleskunner VIPS De Alleskunner Duo's	1 February 2020	Christmas Special 2023	23 December 2023	Inge de Bruijn	Frank Lammers (voice-over)	SBS6
Netherlands	De Alleskunner De Alleskunner VIPS De Alleskunner Duo's	1 February 2020	5	Winter-Spring 2024	Thijs	Frank Lammers (voice-over)	SBS6
Netherlands	De Alleskunner De Alleskunner VIPS De Alleskunner Duo's	1 February 2020	VIPS 5	Fall 2024	Rick Douwsma	Frank Lammers (voice-over)	SBS6
Netherlands	De Alleskunner De Alleskunner VIPS De Alleskunner Duo's	1 February 2020	Christmas Special 2024	23 December 2024	Laura Ponticorvo	Frank Lammers (voice-over)	SBS6
Netherlands	De Alleskunner De Alleskunner VIPS De Alleskunner Duo's	1 February 2020	Duo's 1	Spring 2025	Kaan & Efkan	Frank Lammers (voice-over)	SBS6
Netherlands	De Alleskunner De Alleskunner VIPS De Alleskunner Duo's	1 February 2020	VIPS 6	Fall 2025	Daan Zwierink	Frank Lammers (voice-over)	SBS6
Norway	Sistemann ut	13 April 2023	1	2023	Marthe Kristoffersen	Martin Johnsrud Sundby (season 1–2); Christina Vukicevic (season 3–)	TV Norge
Norway	Sistemann ut	13 April 2023	2	2024	Pierre Olsson	Martin Johnsrud Sundby (season 1–2); Christina Vukicevic (season 3–)	TV Norge
Norway	Sistemann ut	13 April 2023	3	2025	Stig-André Berge	Martin Johnsrud Sundby (season 1–2); Christina Vukicevic (season 3–)	TV Norge
Norway	Sistemann ut	13 April 2023	4	2026	Magnus Gruer	Martin Johnsrud Sundby (season 1–2); Christina Vukicevic (season 3–)	TV Norge
Poland	99 – gra o wszystko 99 – gra o wszystko. VIP	2 January 2022	VIP 1	2022	Dominik Strzelec	Rafał Mohr (voice-over)	TTV
Poland	99 – gra o wszystko 99 – gra o wszystko. VIP	2 January 2022	1	Spring 2022	Piotr Dziedzina	Rafał Mohr (voice-over)	TTV
Poland	99 – gra o wszystko 99 – gra o wszystko. VIP	2 January 2022	VIP 2	Summer 2022	Malwina Wędzikowska	Rafał Mohr (voice-over)	TTV
Poland	99 – gra o wszystko 99 – gra o wszystko. VIP	2 January 2022	VIP 3	Spring 2023	Krzysztof Radzikowski	Rafał Mohr (voice-over)	TTV
Poland	99 – gra o wszystko 99 – gra o wszystko. VIP	2 January 2022	VIP 4	Spring 2024	Mateusz Stachowiak	Rafał Mohr (voice-over)	TTV
Poland	99 – gra o wszystko 99 – gra o wszystko. VIP	2 January 2022	VIP 5	Spring 2025	Leon Zieliński	Rafał Mohr (voice-over)	TTV
Poland	99 – gra o wszystko 99 – gra o wszystko. VIP	2 January 2022	VIP 6	Spring 2026	Tomasz Iwan	Rafał Mohr (voice-over)	TTV
Spain	99 para ganar	TBA	1	2026	Upcoming season	Miki Nadal and Irene Junquera	Antena 3
Sweden	Herre på täppan	6 November 2022	1	2022	Erica Johansson	Carina Berg	Kanal 5
United Kingdom	99 to Beat	22 March 2025	1	2025	Caitlin Lawlor	Adam and Ryan Thomas	ITV
United States	99 to Beat	21 September 2025	1	2025	Peter Nevins	Ken Jeong and Erin Andrews	Fox

== See also ==
- List of television game show franchises
