= Love Is Blind: Brazil season 1 =

2021 Brazilian reality TV series

Love Is Blind: Brazil
- Season 1
- Presented by: Camila Queiroz; Klebber Toledo
- No. of episodes: 11

Release
- Original network: Netflix
- Original release: October 6 – November 4, 2021

Season chronology
- Next → Season 2

The first season of Love Is Blind: Brazil (Portuguese: Casamento às Cegas: Brasil) premiered on Netflix on October 6, 2021, as part of a three-week event. Brazilian celebrity couple Camila Queiroz and Klebber Toledo joined the show as hosts.

== Season summary ==
Couples	Married	Still together	Relationship notes
Nanda and Mack	Yes	Yes	Nanda and Mack got engaged in October 2021 during the reunion episode. They welcomed their first child, Ben, on May 31, 2022. Married in 2023 during the After the Altar episode.
Luana and Lissio	Yes	No	Luana and Lissio got married in March 2021. At the reunion, it was revealed that the two were still together. The couple announced their separation on November 1, 2022.
Carol and Hudson	Yes	No	Carol and Hudson got married in March 2021. At the reunion, it was revealed that the two had since separated.
Nanda and Thiago	Yes	No	Nanda and Thiago got married in March 2021. At the reunion, it was revealed that the two were separated.
Ana and Shayan	No	No	They split on their wedding day after both of them said no.
Dayanne and Rodrigo	No	No	They split on their wedding day after Dayanne said no due to their "irreconcilable differences" and Rodrigo's inability to "take their relationship seriously".

== Participants ==
Name	Age	Occupation	Hometown	Relationship Status
Luana Braga	33	Therapist	Bahia	Married, split after the wedding.
Lissio Fiod	34	Entrepreneur	Maranhão	Married, split after the wedding.
Carolina "Carol" Novaes	29	Lawyer	São Paulo	Married, split after the wedding.
Hudson Mendes	26	Entrepreneur	São Paulo	Married, split after the wedding.
Fernanda "Nanda" Terra	36	Beauty artist	São Paulo	Married, split after the wedding.
Thiago Rocha	34	Skydiver	São Paulo	Married, split after the wedding.
Ana Prado	29	Model	São Paulo	Split at the wedding
Shayan Haghbin	30	Merchant	São Paulo	Split at the wedding
Dayanne Feitoza	31	Bank clerk	São Paulo	Split at the wedding
Rodrigo Vaisemberg	35	Insurance broker	São Paulo	Split at the wedding
Aline Magara	29	N/A		Split before the wedding (Note: These relationships and engagements were not aired in the final cut, but was confirmed by independently.)
Diego Pasquini	36	N/A		Split before the wedding
Ana Gaudêncio	33	N/A		Split before the wedding
Alexis Martinho	31	N/A		Split before the wedding
Anna Arraes	29	N/A		Split before the wedding
Bruno Brych	35	N/A		Split before the wedding
Pamella de Sousa	34	N/A		Split before the wedding
Gustavo Mester	33	N/A		Split before the wedding
Priscilla Pitman	28	N/A		Split before the wedding
Victor Varella	29	N/A		Split before the wedding
Artur Nassar	—N/a	N/A		Not engaged
Bárbara Buff	29	N/A		Not engaged
Carla Maion	36	N/A		Not engaged
Carolina Stamatis	29	N/A		Not engaged
Gabriella Gonçalves	24	N/A		Not engaged
Fabiana Maruyama	36	N/A		Not engaged
Flavio Henrique	37	N/A		Not engaged
Leo Conceição	33	N/A		Not engaged
Luiz Paulo Melhor	32	N/A		Not engaged
Mackdavid "Mack" Alves	36	N/A		Not engaged
Mayara Carvalho	29	N/A		Not engaged
Thiago de Oliveira	28	N/A		Not engaged

=== Future appearances ===
In 2022, Shay Haghbin appeared on A Fazenda 14, where he was ejected from the game alongside model Tiago Ramos due to violent behavior towards each other, finishing in 16th–15th place. In 2023, Shay returned for a second chance in A Fazenda 15, where he was the 13th contestant to be evicted on day 91, finishing in 8th place.

== Episodes ==
No. overall	No. in season	Title	Original release date
Week 1
1	1	"Pod of Love"	October 6, 2021
2	2	"Yes, I Will!"	October 6, 2021
3	3	"Sexy Honeymoon"	October 6, 2021
4	4	"Better Together"	October 6, 2021
Week 2
5	5	"Expectation vs. Reality"	October 13, 2021
6	6	"Living Together"	October 13, 2021
7	7	"Where Do We Go from Here?"	October 13, 2021
8	8	"The Wedding Approaches"	October 13, 2021
Week 3
9	9	"Bachelor Party"	October 20, 2021
10	10	"Moment of Truth"	October 20, 2021
Special
11	11	"The Reunion"	November 4, 2021

== Critical response ==
Some reviews criticized the lack of body diversity among the cast, arguing that the series' premise of determining whether love is truly blind was undermined by the predominantly conventionally attractive cast.

== Unaired engagements ==
A total of ten couples got engaged among the contestants. In addition to the five couples shown on the series, another five also got engaged in the show: They were: Aline Magara and Diego Pasquini, Ana Gaudêncio and Alexis Martinho, Anna Arraes and Bruno Brych, Pamella de Sousa and Gustavo Mester, Priscilla Pitman and Victor Varella.

== Production ==
Filming began in São Paulo on January 16, 2021, and lasted 39 days up until the weddings. After the five newly engaged couples left the pods, filming took place at the Lake Villas Charm Hotel in Amparo, São Paulo, Brazil, when all the couples went on a retreat. Then, the relationships that made it through the retreat in the countryside moved in together in an apartment complex in São Paulo, where they spent the rest of the time filming up until the weddings in March 2021.
