= Ryan Thomas =

British actor (born 1984)

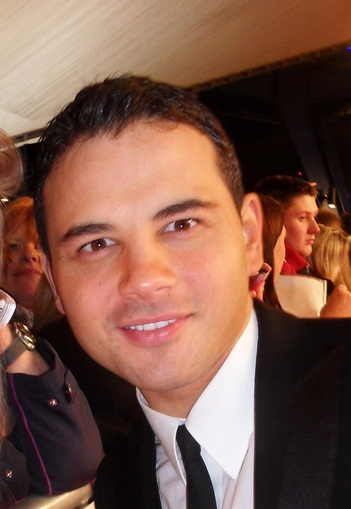
- Thomas in 2009
- Born: Ryan James Thomas; 10 June 1984 (age 42); Salford, Greater Manchester, England
- Occupations: Actor; television presenter
- Years active: 2000–present
- Television: Coronation Street (2000–2016, 2025); Neighbours (2018); Celebrity Big Brother (2018); Dancing on Ice (2024); 99 to Beat (2025)
- Partner(s): Tina O'Brien (2003–2009); Lucy Mecklenburgh (2017–present; engaged)
- Children: 3
- Relatives: Adam Thomas (brother); Scott Thomas (brother)

Ryan James Thomas (born 10 June 1984) is a British actor. He is known for playing the role of Jason Grimshaw on ITV soap opera Coronation Street from 2000 until 2016 and again in 2025. In 2018, he played Rafael Humphreys in Australian soap opera Neighbours, and won the twenty-second series of Celebrity Big Brother.

Thomas announced his retirement from acting in 2021, however has continued his work in television and won the sixteenth series of Dancing on Ice in 2024, as well as returning to Coronation Street for a short stint the following year.

== Early life ==
Ryan James Thomas was born on 10 June 1984 in Salford, Greater Manchester, England. He is of English, Indian and Caribbean ancestry. His paternal grandfather is from Mumbai, India, and emigrated to Manchester, England, in 1947. His paternal great-grandmother was a West Indian who had Caribbean ancestry. Thomas is the older brother of Waterloo Road and former Emmerdale actor, Adam Thomas, and Love Island personality, Scott Thomas.

== Career ==
Thomas was 16 when he made his on-screen debut as Jason Grimshaw in Coronation Street on 25 December 2000. In 2012, Thomas took part in a documentary called Corrie Goes to Kenya, along with his co-stars Brooke Vincent (Sophie Webster), Sue Cleaver (who plays his on-screen mother Eileen Grimshaw) and Ben Price (Nick Tilsley). Thomas said that his time in Kenya changed him as a person and made him realise how much he has in life.

Thomas left Coronation Street in June 2016, after almost sixteen years in the role. He told Daniel Kilkelly of Digital Spy that he wanted "a different experience" and the chance to pursue other roles. His co-star Terence Maynard, who played his on-screen father Tony Stewart, was also a big factor in his decision to leave the soap. He added "It could be stage, it could be TV, or I could disappear and start learning my craft – start from the bottom and do some acting classes again. These are all things that I need to do because I feel like I haven't done them yet."

He made his panto debut in late-2016 as Prince Charming in the Wyvern Theatre production of Cinderella. The following year, he starred as Captain Hook in Peter Pan at Venue Cymru. In 2018, he played the role at the Beck Theatre, Hayes. In 2019 he starred in the role of Dick Whittington at the Grand Theatre in Wolverhampton.

Thomas joined the cast of Australian television soap opera Neighbours in October 2017 as Rafael Humphreys. He made his on-screen debut during the 60-minute "Hit & Run" special on 12 February 2018.

In August 2018, Thomas took part in the 22nd series of Celebrity Big Brother. During the episode broadcast on 30 August, Thomas was seen play fighting with actress Roxanne Pallett. Pallett then accused him of intentionally punching her, video footage failed to show Thomas had made physical any contact, apart from a brush with his ring finger. Pallett has since apologised to Thomas for what she has described as "an overreaction to what wasn't a malicious act". On 10 September 2018, Thomas was announced as the winner of the series.

Thomas appeared as a contestant in Celebrity Masterchef in 2022. In December 2022, Thomas won Celebrity Antiques Road Trip.

In March 2021, Thomas announced he was quitting acting, after having "really lost the bug for it".

In March 2024, he won the sixteenth series of Dancing on Ice with dance partner Amani Fancy.

== Personal life ==
Thomas dated his Coronation Street co-star Tina O'Brien from 2003 until 2009. They have a daughter together. Thomas has been in a relationship with Lucy Mecklenburgh since 2017. They met while taking part in Celebrity Island with Bear Grylls. He became engaged to Mecklenburgh in June 2019. They have a son and a daughter together.

In 2013, he filed for bankruptcy following an unpaid tax bill of £40,000. Thomas was arrested in 2015 for being drunk and disorderly in a Lake District nightclub. He was fined £90.

== Filmography ==
Year	Title	Role	Notes	Ref.
2000	Hollyoaks	Student	Background Extra; 1 Episode	
2000–2016; 2025	Coronation Street	Jason Grimshaw	Main Role; 1,508 Episodes	
2010	East Street	Jason Grimshaw	Charity crossover between Coronation Street and EastEnders	
2017	The Celebrity Island with Bear Grylls	Participant	Series 2	
2018	Neighbours	Rafael Humphreys	17 episodes	
2018	Celebrity Big Brother	Housemate	Series 22; Winner	
2020	Absolutely India: Mancs in Mumbai	Self	6 episodes	
2022	Celebrity MasterChef	Self	Series 17; Contestant	
2024	Dancing on Ice	Self	Series 16; Winner	
2025	99 to Beat	Co-Presenter	Alongside Adam Thomas	

== Awards and nominations ==
Year	Award	Category	Result	Ref.
2007	British Soap Awards	Best On-Screen Partnership (shared with Sue Cleaver)	Nominated	
2007	Inside Soap Awards	Sexiest Male	Nominated	
2007	Inside Soap Awards	Best Couple (shared with Tina O'Brien)	Nominated	
2008	Digital Spy Soap Awards	Sexiest Male	Nominated	
2008	British Soap Awards	Sexiest Male	Nominated	
2008	Inside Soap Awards	Sexiest Male	Nominated	
2009	British Soap Awards	Sexiest Male	Nominated	
2009	Inside Soap Awards	Sexiest Male	Nominated	
2010	British Soap Awards	Sexiest Male	Nominated	
2010	Inside Soap Awards	Sexiest Male	Nominated	
2012	British Soap Awards	Sexiest Male	Nominated	
2012	Inside Soap Awards	Sexiest Male	Nominated	
2014	2014 British Soap Awards	Sexiest Male	Shortlisted	
2014	Inside Soap Awards	Sexiest Male	Nominated	
2015	Inside Soap Awards	Best Affair (shared with Sair Khan)	Nominated	
2016	TV Choice Awards	Best Soap Actor	Nominated	

== See also ==
- List of Celebrity Big Brother (British TV series) housemates

Preceded by Shane Jenek / Courtney Act	Celebrity Big Brother UK winner Series 22 (2018)	Succeeded by David Potts
