= Rodrigo Lombardi =

Brazilian actor and voice actor (born 1976)

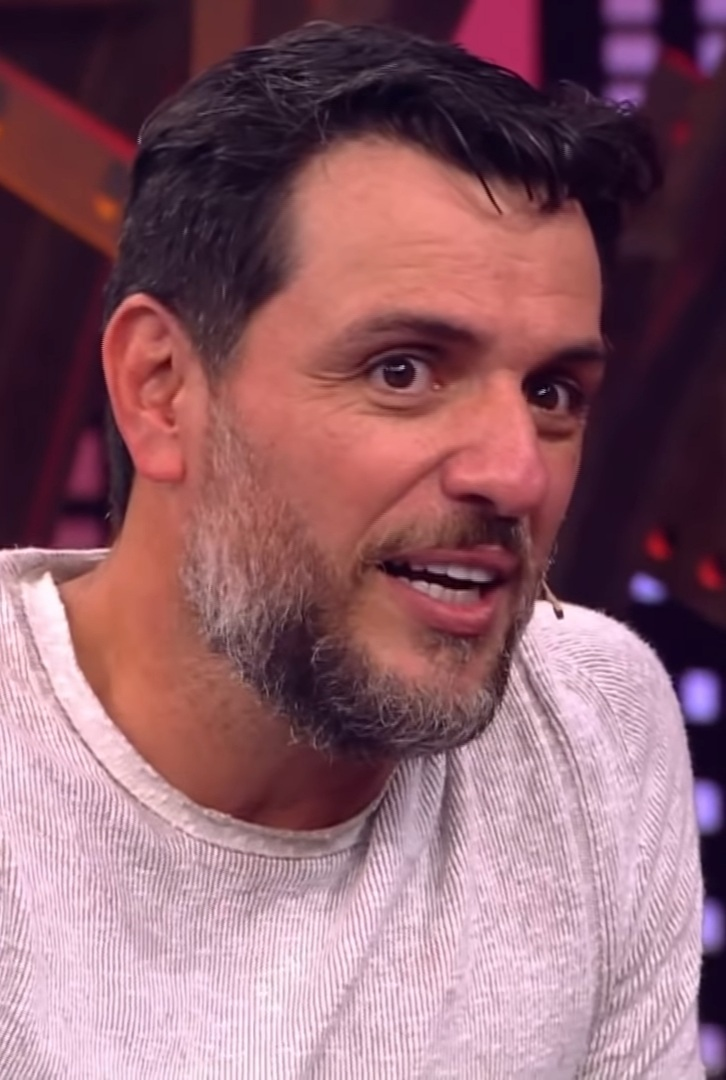
- Lombardi in 2021
- Born: Rodrigo Lombardi; 15 October 1976 (age 49); São Paulo, Brazil
- Occupations: Actor, voice actor
- Years active: 1995–present
- Spouse: Betty Baumgarten (m. 2005)
- Children: 1

Rodrigo Lombardi (born 15 October 1976) is a Brazilian actor and voice actor. He is known for his roles in various Brazilian telenovelas such as Caminho das Índias (2009), Passione (2010), Salve Jorge (2012), among others.

== Filmography ==
=== Films ===
Year	Film	Role	Notes
2008	Simbologia de Um Crime		Also director
2009	The Princess and the Frog	Prince Naveen	Brazilian version
2010	Bed & Breakfast	Bartolomeu	
2012	Brave	Lorde DingWall	Brazilian version
2013	Legends of Oz: Dorothy's Return	Bufão	Brazilian version
2014	Amor em Sampa	Mauro	
2014	How to Train Your Dragon 2	Drago	Brazilian version
2016	Zootopia	Nick Wilde	Brazilian version
2017	Smurfs: The Lost Village	Gargamel	Brazilian version
2017	Despicable Me 3	Man with Scar	Brazilian version
2017	Transformers: The Last Knight	Canopy	Brazilian dubbed version
2018	Ralph Breaks the Internet	Nick Wilde	Brazilian version
2020	The Croods: A New Age	Phil Betterman	Brazilian version
2022	Turning Red	Jin Lee	Brazilian version
2023	Once Upon a Studio	Nick Wilde	Brazilian version
2024	The Wild Robot	Fink	Brazilian version
2025	Zootopia 2	Nick Wilde	Brazilian Version

=== Television ===
Year	Title	Role	Notes
1998	Meu Pé de Laranja Lima	Henrique	
2001	Acampamento Legal	Guarda Florestal	
2002	Marisol	Francisco Soares	
2004	Metamorfoses	Fábio Fraga	
2005	Bang Bang	Constantino Zoltar "Cons"	
2006	Pé na Jaca	Tadeu Lancellot	
2007	Desejo Proibido	Ciro Feijó	
2008	Guerra e Paz	Marco Antonio Guerra	Episode: "Manos e Brous"
2008	Casos e Acasos	Inácio	Episode: "O Carro, o E-mail e o Rapper"
2009	Caminho das Índias	Raj Ananda	
2009	Episódio Especial	Himself	
2010	Passione	Mauro Santarém	
2011	Ti Ti Ti	Par de Jaqueline	
2011	O Astro	Herculano Quintanilha	
2012	As Brasileiras	Rodrigo Prates	Episode: "A Fofoqueira de Porto Alegre"
2012	Salve Jorge	Théo Garcia	
2013	A Grande Família	Alex Malman	
2014	Meu Pedacinho de Chão	Pedro Falcão	
2015	Tá no Ar: a TV na TV	Himself	
2015	Verdades Secretas	Alexandre Ticiano "Alex"	
2016	Velho Chico	Capitão Ernesto Rosa	
2017	A Força do Querer	Caio Garcia	
2017	Carcereiros	Adriano Ferreira de Araújo	
2021	Passport to Freedom	João Guimarães Rosa	
2022	Travessia	Moretti	
2024	Mania de Você	Molina	

== Awards and nominations ==
Year	Awards	Category	Nominated work	Result
2009	Prêmio Arte Qualidade Brasil	Best Actor	Caminho das índias	Won
2009	Prêmio Extra de TV	Best Actor	Caminho das índias	Won
2011	Prêmio Extra de TV	Best Actor	O Astro	Won
2011	Melhores do Ano	Best Actor	O Astro	Nominated
2013	Prêmio Contigo! de TV	Best Actor for a Telenovela	Salve Jorge	Nominated
2014	Prêmio Quem de Televisão	Best Actor	Meu Pedacinho de Chão	Nominated
2015	Prêmio Extra de Televisão	Best Actor	Verdades Secretas	Won
2015	Prêmio Quem de Televisão	Best Actor	Verdades Secretas	Nominated
2015	Melhores do Ano	Melhor Ator de Novela	Verdades Secretas	Nominated
2015	Melhores do Ano NaTelinha	Best Actor	Verdades Secretas	Nominated
