= Felipe Andreoli (journalist) =

Brazilian journalist and humorist (born 1980)

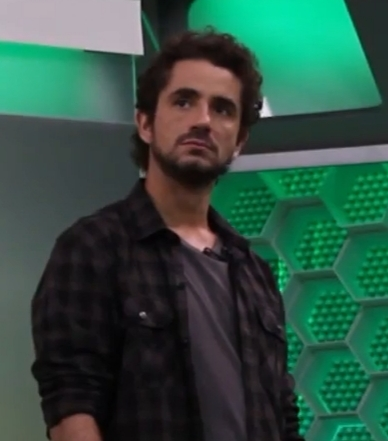
- Presenter Felipe Andreoli, presenting Esporte Espetacular (Spectacular Sports) in 2017
- Born: Luiz Felipe Guimarães Andreoli; February 5, 1980 (age 46); São Paulo, SP
- Occupations: Journalist and humorist
- Website: www.felipeandreoli.net

Luiz Felipe Guimarães Andreoli (São Paulo, February 5, 1980) is a Brazilian journalist and humorist. Currently is part of the program Custe o Que Custar, on the Rede Bandeirantes network, also presenting Band's new sports show, Deu Olé.
