= Camila Queiroz =

Brazilian actress and model (born 1993)

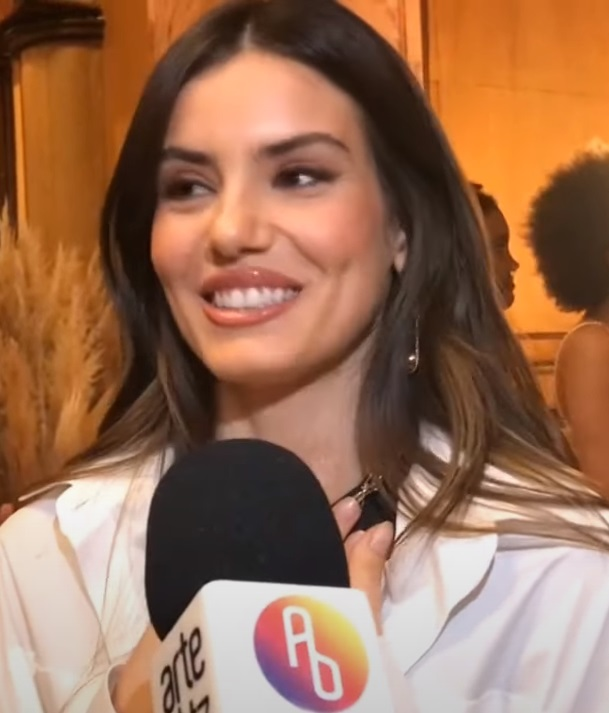
- Queiroz in 2023
- Born: Camila Tavares de Queiroz; 27 June 1993 (age 32); Ribeirão Preto, São Paulo, Brazil
- Occupations: Actress; model
- Years active: 2015–present (actress); 2007–present (model)
- Height: 1.78 m (5 ft 10 in)
- Spouse: Klebber Toledo (m. 2018)
- Family: Sérgio Queiroz (father); Eliane Tavares (mother); Caroline Queiroz (older sister); Melina Queiroz (younger sister)

Camila de Queiroz Toledo (Brazilian Portuguese: [kɐˈmilɐ kejˈɾɔs]; née Tavares; born 27 June 1993) is a Brazilian actress and model. She is known for her role as Angel in the International Emmy Award-winning telenovela Verdades Secretas.

== Biography ==
Camila was born in Ribeirão Preto, São Paulo. From a humble family of Portuguese and Syrian descent, her mother is a manicurist, and her father is a carpenter. Camila has two sisters (Caroline and Melina Queiroz), being the middle daughter.

== Career ==
=== 2007–2014: Modeling career ===
During the age of 14, she has been living alone in São Paulo, after winning the contest Pernambucanas Faces in the national phase and signed a contract with Ford Models. At the age of 16, she was living in Japan contracted by a local agency. At the age of 18, she moved to New York City continuing her modeling career, where she participated in international campaigns such as Armani Exchange brand.

=== 2015–present ===
Queiroz lived in the United States for three years. When she was 21, she was invited to audition for a telenovela by Walcyr Carrasco, Verdades Secretas. She was cast as Angel / Arlete, a young naive girl that has the dream of being a rich and successful model, but ends up working as a high class prostitute. Being her acting debut, she received praise from viewers and critics alike and won numerous award for her performance as the protagonist of the series. She also debuted as a host of the end-year special, Festeja Brasil, alongside Márcio Garcia.

In 2016, she returned to work with Carrasco, in Êta Mundo Bom!, playing the naïve Mafalda. Where she lived a love square with Klebber Toledo, Anderson Di Rizzi and Juliane Araújo. In 2017, she starred in Pega Pega, a romantic comedy by Claudia Souto.

Since 2022 she has starred as the older Anita in Brazilian show Back to 15 alongside Maisa.

== Personal life ==
Between 2013 and 2016 she dated model Lucas Cattani.

In August 2016 she took up a relationship with actor Klebber Toledo, during a trip together in Bariloche, Argentina. In June 2017 they became engaged. In August 2018, they were married at a religious ceremony at the Essenza Hotel in Jericoacoara, Ceará, Brazil.

== Filmography ==
=== Television ===
Year	Title	Role
2015–2021	Verdades Secretas	Arlete Brito Gomes "Angel"
2015	Caldeirão de Ouro	Presenter
2016	Êta Mundo Bom!	Mafalda Pereira Torres
2017	Rock Story	Luiza Guimarães
2017–2018	Pega Pega	Luiza Guimarães
2019	Verão 90	Vanessa Dias
2021–present	Love Is Blind: Brazil	Presenter
2022–2024	Back to 15	Anita Rocha
2023	Amor Perfeito	Maria Elisa Rubião
2025	Beleza Fatal	Sofia Fernandes / Júlia Guimarães

=== Film ===
Year	Title	Role
2022	Procura-se	Alicia "Lili" Moraes de Bragança e Lima
2025	Uma Mulher Sem Filtro	Natália

== Awards and nominations ==
Year	Award	Category	Title	Result	Ref.
2015	Extra Television Award	Women's Revelation	Verdades Secretas	Won	
2015	Young Brazilian Prize	Best Young Actress	Verdades Secretas	Won	
2015	Capricho Awards	Best National Actress	Verdades Secretas	Won	
2015	Prêmio Quem de Televisão	Best Actress	Verdades Secretas	Won	
2015	Melhores do Ano	Best Revelation Actress	Verdades Secretas	Nominated	
2015	Prêmio F5	Actress of the Year	Verdades Secretas	Nominated	
2016	Troféu Imprensa	Revelation of the Year	Verdades Secretas	Won	
2016	Troféu Internet	Revelation of the Year	Verdades Secretas	Nominated	
2016	Melty Future Awards	Cool Is Everywhere	Verdades Secretas	Nominated	
2016	Young Brazilian Prize	Best Young Actress	Êta Mundo Bom!	Nominated	
2016	Capricho Awards	Best National Actress	Êta Mundo Bom!	Nominated	
2016	Prêmio Canal Entreter	Best actress	Êta Mundo Bom!	Nominated	
2016	Prêmio Extra de Televisão de 2016	Best Supporting Actress	Êta Mundo Bom!	Nominated	
2016	Melhores do Ano Atrevida	Favorite actress	Êta Mundo Bom!	Nominated	
2016	Melhores do Ano	Best Supporting Actress	Êta Mundo Bom!	Won	
2016	Prêmio Quem de Televisão	Best Supporting Actress	Êta Mundo Bom!	Nominated	
