= A Dona do Pedaço =

Brazilian telenovela

- Also known as: Sweet Diva
- Genre: Telenovela
- Created by: Walcyr Carrasco
- Written by: Márcio Haiduck; Nelson Nadotti; Vinícius Vianna
- Directed by: Luciano Sabino
- Starring: Juliana Paes; Marcos Palmeira; Agatha Moreira; Reynaldo Gianecchini; Paolla Oliveira; Nathalia Dill; Sérgio Guizé; Caio Castro; Malvino Salvador; Deborah Evelyn; Heloísa Jorge; Marco Nanini; Monica Iozzi; Anderson Di Rizzi; Lucy Ramos
- Opening theme: "Tá Escrito" by Xande de Pilares
- Country of origin: Brazil
- Original language: Portuguese
- No. of episodes: 161 (135 International version)

Production
- Production locations: São Paulo, Brazil
- Camera setup: Multi-camera
- Running time: 45 minutes
- Production company: Estúdios Globo

Original release
- Network: Rede Globo
- Release: 20 May – 22 November 2019

A Dona do Pedaço (English title: Sweet Diva) is a Brazilian telenovela produced and broadcast by Globo. It premiered on 20 May 2019, replacing O Sétimo Guardião, and ended on 22 November 2019, replaced by Amor de Mãe. It was written by Walcyr Carrasco, with the collaboration of Márcio Haiduck, Nelson Nadotti and Vinícius Vianna; with the direction of André Barros, Bernardo Sá, Bruno Martins Moraes, Caetano Caruso and Vicente Kubrusly, general direction of Luciano Sabino and artistic direction of Amora Mautner.

It stars Juliana Paes, Marcos Palmeira, Agatha Moreira, Paolla Oliveira, Nathalia Dill, Sérgio Guizé, Caio Castro and Reynaldo Gianecchini in the main roles, with special participation of Fernanda Montenegro.

== Plot ==
In 1999, in the fictional city of Rio Vermelho, the families of vigilantes Ramirez and Matheus lived in war for generations until Maria da Paz (Juliana Paes) and Amadeu (Marcos Palmeira) fell in love and sealed a peace agreement between them. On the wedding day, however, Amadeu is mysteriously shot and the war is restarted, causing Maria to flee to São Paulo without knowing that she is pregnant. The mothers of both clans, concerned for their children, make a deal and lie to the families that both Maria and Amadeu are dead, but in revenge Amadeu's father orders Maria's nieces to be murdered. Both girls end up miraculously saving themselves: Fabiana ends up in a convent and Virginia "Vivi" lives on the streets until she is adopted by the rich couple Beatriz (Natália do Vale) and Otávio (José de Abreu). Twenty years later, Maria becomes a successful baking entrepreneur thanks to family recipes, although she never gets along with her daughter, Josiane (Agatha Moreira), who criticizes her behavior and appearance. Josiane knows that she needs her mother to achieve the social projection she needs to become an influencer, and devises a plan with the help of Régis (Reynaldo Gianecchini). Maria reunites with Amadeu and discovers the lie that separated them, but they are prevented from resuming their romance when his wife, Gilda (Heloísa Jorge), becomes seriously ill. Devastated, Maria marries Régis, without imagining that he is her daughter's partner in the plan to get her hands on her entire fortune.

Meanwhile, Maria's nieces took different paths: Vivi (Paolla Oliveira) became famous on the internet for her charisma, being everything Josiane always dreamed of, and lives an overwhelming romance with Chiclete (Sérgio Guizé) without knowing that he is a hitman sent to execute her, although he also loves her. Fabiana (Nathalia Dill), on the other hand, spent a miserable life in the convent and, upon discovering that Vivi is her sister, decides to ruin her life, fuelled by the hatred of the different life opportunities they had. In addition, Fabiana also begins to threaten Otávio and Josiane by discovering their secrets.

== Cast ==
- Juliana Paes as Maria da Paz Sobral Ramirez
- Marcos Palmeira as Amadeu da Penha Matheus
- Agatha Moreira as Josiane "Jô" Sobral Ramirez Matheus
- Reynaldo Gianecchini as Régis Mantovani
- Paolla Oliveira as Virgínia Sobral Ramirez / Virgínia Guedes "Vivi"
- Nathalia Dill as Fabiana Sobral Ramirez / Fabiana do Rosário
- Sérgio Guizé as Ricardo Martins Ramirez "Chiclete"
- Caio Castro as Rock Souza Macondo
- Malvino Salvador as Agno Aguiar
- Deborah Evelyn as Lyris Mantovani Aguiar
- Heloísa Jorge as Gilda Cunha Matheus
- Lee Taylor as Camilo D'ávila Muniz
- Monica Iozzi as Kim Ventura
- Anderson Di Rizzi as Márcio Sorrentino
- Lucy Ramos as Sílvia Cunha
- Rainer Cadete as Teodoro "Téo" Pacheco
- Marco Nanini as Eusébio Macondo / Eustáquio Macondo Júnior
- Rosi Campos as Dorotéia de Souza Macondo "Dodô"
- Natália do Vale as Beatriz Andrade Guedes
- José de Abreu as Otávio Guedes
- Betty Faria as Cornélia Macondo Ferreira
- Tonico Pereira as João Francisco Ferreira "Chico"
- Suely Franco as Marlene da Conceição Valadares
- Nívea Maria as Evelina Sobral Ramirez
- Ary Fontoura as Antero Valadares
- Guilherme Leicam as Leandro Ramirez Martins "Mão Santa"
- Rafael Queiroz as Rael Matheus
- Nathalia Timberg as Gladys Mantovani
- Rosamaria Murtinho as Linda Andrade
- Rosane Gofman as Ellen da Rocha
- Glamour Garcia as Rarisson Souza Macondo / Britney Souza Macondo
- Pedro Carvalho as Abel da Gama Ferronha
- Bruno Bevan as José Hélio de Souza Macondo "Zé Hélio"
- Carol Garcia as Sabrina de Souza
- Mel Maia as Cássia Mantovani Aguiar
- João Gabriel D'Aleluia as Carlito Cunha Matheus
- Cadu Libonati as Raul Pacheco "Merlin"
- Branca Previliato as Priscila de Albuquerque "Pri"
- Betto Marques as Antonio "Tonho" Ribeiro
- Osvaldo Mil as Cosme Pereira
- Duio Botta as Jardel
- Mariano Junior as Sávio
- Duda Nagle as Paulo Roberto Vidigal
- Bruna Hamú as Joana Fernandes
- Catarina de Carvalho as Alba
- Felipe Titto as Abdias
- Gláucio Gomes as Nicolas
- Thiago Thomé as Adriano
- Fernando Zili as André
- Pablo Titto as Tico
- Luciana Fernandes as Jeniffer
- Jardel Camelo as Beto
- Bruno Barboza as Eurico
- Samira Lochter as Sueli
- Chan Suan as Naomi
- Dani Guimarães as Lígia

=== Guest stars ===
- Fernanda Montenegro as Dulce Ramirez
- Maeve Jinkings as Zenaide Sobral Ramirez
- Dionísio Neto as Hélcio Ramirez
- Genézio de Barros as Ademir Ramirez
- Luiz Carlos Vasconcelos as Miroel Matheus
- Jussara Freire as Nilda Matheus
- Álamo Facó as Vicente da Penha Matheus
- Áurea Maranhão as Ticiana da Penha Matheus
- Ismael Caneppele as Murilo Matheus
- Cesar Ferrario as Adão Ramirez Martins
- Maria Sílvia Radomille as Berenice Ramirez Martins
- Berta Loran as Dinorá
- Fernando Eiras as Padre Elias
- Regina Sampaio as Madre Maria
- Cynthia Senek as Edilene Pereira
- Gretchen as Gina
- Emilio Moreira as Aírton Ramirez
- Ana Barroso as Josiane Ramirez
- Patrícia Palhares as Irmã Fátima
- Mirella Sabarense as Child Maria da Paz
- Malu Fernandes as Child Zenaide
- Victor Aguiar as Young Hélcio
- Duda Batista as Child Virgínia
- Maria Clara Baldon as Child Fabiana
- Bernardo Amil as Child Júnior
- Luiz Felipe Melo as Child Chiclete
- Mari Cardoso as Child Josiane
- Luiz Eduardo Toledo as Young Rael
- Leo Scarpa as Child Rock
- Flávio Bisneto as Child Zé Hélio
- Theo Almeida as Child Rarisson
- Alice Jardim as Child Sabrina
- Fátima Bernardes as Herself
- Dudu Bertholini as Himself
- Camila Coutinho as Herself
- Ana Furtado as Gerusa
- Elizângela as Carmelinda

== Production ==
The main inspiration for Walcyr was the telenovela Vale Tudo, written by Gilberto Braga, Aguinaldo Silva and Leonor Bassères in 1988, from where he used the story of the bad-natured daughter who steals from her own mother to try to rise socially in Rio de Janeiro. Another reference was the book Mildred Pierce, written by James Cain in 1941, which tells the story of a mother who suffers with her rebellious daughter. The story of the impossible love between Juliana Paes and Marcos Palmeira and the rivalry between the family was inspired by the tragedy of Romeo and Juliet by William Shakespeare. In November 2018, Walcyr Carrasco and Amora Mautner traveled to the interior of Espírito Santo to choose where filming would take place, but the leadership gave up using the state without explanation. Although the fictional city of Rio Vermelho is located in the interior of Espírito Santo, filming was done in Rio Grande do Sul, using the cities of Jaguarão, Nova Esperança do Sul, São Gabriel and Jaguari as scenery.

Originally the telenovela was titled called Dias Felizes, but it was later changed to A Dona do Pedaço (literal translation The Owner of the Piece), to express the struggle for a better life for the main character. Filming of the first phase of the telenovela began on 27 February 2019 and, on 15 March 2019, filming of the second phase began at Estúdios Globo in Rio de Janeiro.

=== Cast selection ===
Juliana Paes, Paolla Oliveira and Reynaldo Gianecchini were reserved for the main roles of the telenovela in October 2018. Bianca Bin was invited to play the antagonist Josiane, repeating the partnership with the author of O Outro Lado do Paraíso, however the actress could only be present in two days of recording per week, and was replaced by actress Agatha Moreira. Invited to play Silvia, Sheron Menezzes preferred to be part of the cast of the telenovela Bom Sucesso, being replaced by Lucy Ramos. Vera Holtz was cast in the role of Dorothea, but the actress was relocated to star in the series Eu, Vó e a Boi after the departure of Susana Vieira, and was replaced by actress Rosi Campos.

Laura Cardoso was announced in the cast in December 2018 and even gave interviews giving details about the character, however, she was replaced by Betty Faria shortly before filming began, since the management feared that the actress's health instability would hamper the progress of the plot. Later, Laura entered the final episodes of the telenovela in the role of Matilde. Marieta Severo refused the role of Beatriz so she could star in the series Filhas da Eva and was replaced by Natália do Vale. Marina Moschen and Bella Piero were considered to play Joana, but Bruna Hamú ended up being cast for the character. Carol Marra auditioned to play Britney, but lost the role for not fitting the ideal profile, Glamour Garcia stayed with the character. Juliano Cazarré was invited to play the character Rael, but he was already booked to work on Amor de Mãe. Rafael Queiroz took the role.

== Reception ==
=== Ratings ===
Season	Timeslot (BRT/AMT)	Episodes	First aired		Last aired		Avg. viewers (points)
Season	Timeslot (BRT/AMT)	Episodes	Date	Viewers (in points)	Date	Viewers (in points)	Avg. viewers (points)
1	Mon–Sat 9:15 p.m.	161	20 May 2019	32.5	22 November 2019	44.3	35.9

=== Review ===
Despite the good audience, the telenovela was criticized several times for underestimating the public's intelligence. The Notícias da TV website evaluated the telenovela with a negative critique: "A Dona do Pedaço enshrines prime-time mediocrity (...) Doubtful plots and incoherent characters have already become common in Globo's 9 pm telenovelas, just as the name of Walcyr Carrasco was already synonymous with good comedies, in the times of O Cravo e a Rosa (2000) and Chocolate com Pimenta (2003). The rural and unpretentious scripts were a success. The change of the author to prime time produced a new type of recognition: he even gets an audience, but his quality has not existed for some time.

== Soundtrack ==
=== Volume 1 ===
A Dona do Pedaço: Vol. 1

Soundtrack album by Various artists
- Released: 2 June 2019
- Length: 42:02
- Label: Som Livre

A Dona do Pedaço: Vol. 1 is the first soundtrack of the telenovela, released on 2 June 2019 by Som Livre.

No.	Title	Artist(s)	Length
1.	"Tá Escrito"	Xande de Pilares	3:35
2.	"Cheia de Manias"	Raça Negra	3:12
3.	"Bebi Liguei"	Marília Mendonça	3:47
4.	"Evidências"	Chitãozinho & Xororó	3:55
5.	"Yiri Yiri Boum"	Dois Africanos	3:02
6.	"Lullaby Love"	Roo Panes	3:36
7.	"Daydream in Blue"	iMonster	2:54
8.	"Ecoute Moi Camarade"	Rachid Taha	3:16
9.	"Learn to Live"	Alice Merton	4:06
10.	"Nobody Makes Money"	Fantastic Negrito	2:38
11.	"Jolene"	Dolly Parton	3:23
12.	"Loyal to Me"	Nina Nesbitt	3:17
13.	"Taki Taki"	DJ Snake feat. Selena Gomez, Ozuna and Cardi B	3:44
Total length:			42:02

=== Volume 2 ===
A Dona do Pedaço: Vol. 2

Soundtrack album by Various artists
- Released: 20 June 2019
- Length: 45:21
- Label: Som Livre

A Dona do Pedaço: Vol. 2 is the second soundtrack of the telenovela, released on 20 June 2019 by Som Livre.

No.	Title	Artist(s)	Length
1.	"Quem Tem o Dom"	Jerry Smith feat. Wesley Safadão	3:35
2.	"7 Rings"	Ariana Grande	3:12
3.	"Beijinho Geladinho"	Netinho de Paula	3:47
4.	"Contramão"	Belo	3:55
5.	"Só o Amor"	Gloria Groove & Preta Gil	3:02
6.	"Snake Charmer"	Gustavo Bertoni	3:36
7.	"Namorada Reserva"	Hugo & Guilherme	2:54
8.	"Só Você e Eu"	Vanessa da Mata	3:16
9.	"The Look"	Metronomy	4:06
10.	"My Only One (No Hay Nadie Mas)"	Sebastián Yatra	2:38
11.	"Eu Sei"	Cai Sahra	3:23
12.	"My Silver Lining"	First Aid Kit	3:17
13.	"Evidências"	Yasmin Santos	3:44
14.	"Me Chame de May Love"	Thiago Brava	3:55
15.	"Nothing Breaks Like a Heart"	Mark Ronson feat. Miley Cyrus	3:02
Total length:			45:21

=== Other songs ===
- "Bad Guy" by Billie Eilish
- "Cadê o Amor?" by Paolo feat. Kell Smith
- "California Dreaming" by Bobby Womack
- "Conga, Conga, Conga" by Gretchen
- "Freak Le Boom Boom" by Gretchen
- "Let Me Down Slowly" by Alec Benjamin
- "Melô do Piripipi (Je Suis La Femme)" by Gretchen
- "O'Death" – Jen Titus
- "Reunion" by Bobbie Gentry
- "Véu" by Eduardo Queiroz

== Awards and nominations ==
Year	Award	Category	Nominated	Result	Ref.
2019	Melhores do Ano	Best Telenovela Actress	Juliana Paes	Won	
2019	Melhores do Ano	Best Telenovela Actor	Reynaldo Gianecchini	Nominated	
2019	Melhores do Ano	Best Supporting Actress	Agatha Moreira	Nominated	
2019	Melhores do Ano	Best Supporting Actress	Paolla Oliveira	Nominated	
2019	Melhores do Ano	Best Supporting Actor	Malvino Salvador	Nominated	
2019	Melhores do Ano	Best Supporting Actor	Sergio Guizé	Won	
2019	Melhores do Ano	Best Revelation Actress	Carol Garcia	Nominated	
2019	Melhores do Ano	Best Revelation Actress	Glamour Garcia	Won	
2019	Melhores do Ano	Best Revelation Actor	Rafael Queiroz	Nominated	
2019	Melhores do Ano NaTelinha	Best Novela		Nominated	
2019	Melhores do Ano NaTelinha	Best Actress	Agatha Moreira	Nominated	
2019	Melhores do Ano NaTelinha	Best Supporting Actress	Fernanda Montenegro	Won	
2019	Prêmio F5	Best Telenovela		Won	
2019	Prêmio F5	Best Telenovela Actress	Juliana Paes	Won	
2019	Prêmio F5	Best Telenovela Actress	Paolla Oliveira	Nominated	
2019	Prêmio F5	Best Revelation	Glamour Garcia	Won	
2019	Prêmio Contigo! Online	Best Telenovela		Won	
2019	Prêmio Contigo! Online	Best Telenovela Actress	Juliana Paes	Nominated	
2019	Prêmio Contigo! Online	Best Supporting Actor	Lee Taylor	Nominated	
2019	Prêmio Contigo! Online	Best Supporting Actor	Sérgio Guizé	Nominated	
2019	Prêmio Contigo! Online	Best Supporting Actress	Agatha Moreira	Nominated	
2019	Prêmio Contigo! Online	Best Supporting Actress	Paolla Oliveira	Won	
2019	Prêmio Contigo! Online	TV Revelation	Carol Garcia	Nominated	
2019	Prêmio Contigo! Online	TV Revelation	Glamour Garcia	Nominated	
2019	Prêmio Contigo! Online	Best Romantic Couple	Paolla Oliveira & Sérgio Guizé	Nominated	
