= Êta Mundo Bom! =

Brazilian telenovela

- Also known as: The Good Side of Life!
- Genre: Telenovela; Romantic comedy
- Created by: Walcyr Carrasco
- Written by: Maria Elisa Berredo
- Directed by: Jorge Fernando
- Starring: Sérgio Guizé; Flávia Alessandra; Débora Nascimento; Bianca Bin; Eriberto Leão; Priscila Fantin; Camila Queiroz; Klebber Toledo; Elizabeth Savalla; Eliane Giardini; Marco Nanini
- Opening theme: "O Sanfoneiro Só Tocava Isso" by Suricato
- Country of origin: Brazil
- Original language: Portuguese
- No. of episodes: 190

Production
- Production locations: São Paulo, Brazil
- Editors: Ubiraci De Motta; Rosemeire Barros Oliveira; Cesar Chaves
- Camera setup: Multi-camera
- Running time: 40 minutes
- Production company: Entretenimento Globo

Original release
- Network: Rede Globo
- Release: 18 January – 26 August 2016

Related
- The Best Side of Life!

The Good Side of Life! (Portuguese: Êta Mundo Bom!) is a Brazilian telenovela produced and broadcast by TV Globo. It premiered on 18 January 2016 in the 6 p.m. timeslot, replacing Além do Tempo and ended on 26 August 2016, being followed by Sol Nascente.

It is written by Walcyr Carrasco and directed by Jorge Fernando. Starring Sérgio Guizé, Flávia Alessandra, Débora Nascimento, Bianca Bin, Eriberto Leão, Elizabeth Savalla, Dhu Moraes, Rosi Campos, Marco Nanini, Miguel Rômulo and Ary Fontoura.

Set in the 1940s, The Good Side of Life! examines the life of Candinho (Sérgio Guizé), a young man who was separated from his mother at birth and lives in abject poverty in the fictitious countryside of Piracema. He moves to the city in search of his estranged rich mother (Eliane Giardini) who at the same time is looking for her. But there is an ambitious niece of the desperate mother, Sandra (Flávia Alessandra) who does everything in her power to keep the fortune for herself.

The telenovela also marks the return of Carrasco in the 6pm timeslot. It is also the most watched telenovela in that timeslot in nine years having recorded a viewership rating of 27 points.

== Plot ==
Candinho was separated from his mother immediately after birth and was raised by the couple Cunegundes and Quinzinho, owners of a farm in the interior of São Paulo in the 1920s. But when he grows up, Candinho he is turned into their employee in this House and later expelled by falling in love to their firstborn, Filomena.

Pancrácio, friend of the family and a mentor to Candinho, advises him to travel to the city in search for his biological mother, Anastáncia, that he had never met. Thus, Candinho travels with his inseparable donkey, Policarpo. On the other hand, Candinho's mother is millionaire widow who is also looking for his son (Candinho) in the capital. She counts on the help of detective Jack and her best friend Emma and Araújo, an attorney. But Anastáncia has no idea that her niece, Sandra, is doing everything possible to prevent her from finding Candinho. By doing so, she maintains favour of being the sole heiress. On Anastáncia's eyes, Sandra is an exemplary, cultured, sweet and generous but in reality, she is unscrupulous, greedy and selfish.

Candinho faces the most diverse situations to survive in the city. In addition to the incessant search of his mother, he is determined to fight for the love of Filomena that now lives in the city and is in relationship with the possessive, Ernesto. Ernesto, who always knew Filó convinces her to run away to the city, promising him the world but to Filó's surprise, her life turns upside-down. To make it worse, Ernesto stays with the money, hence Filomena starts working as a dancer and meets the mysterious Paulina and tormented by an overly ambitious dancer Diana.

== Cast ==
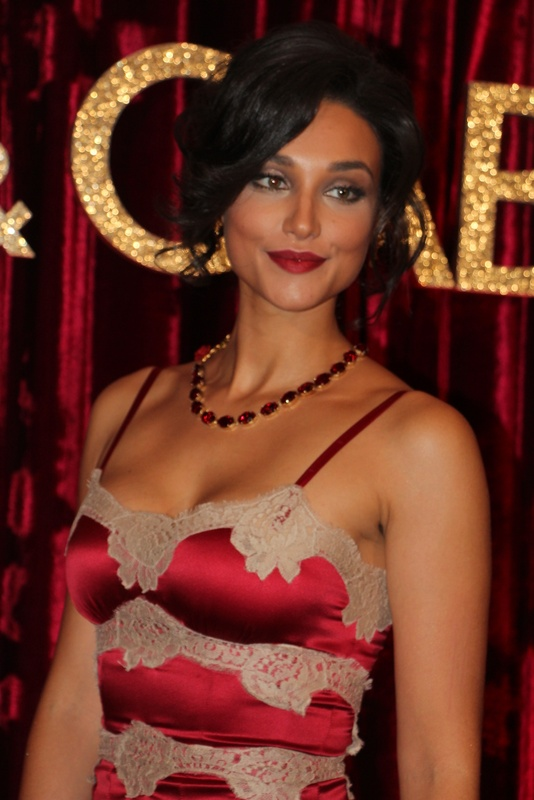
Débora Nascimento (Filómena)

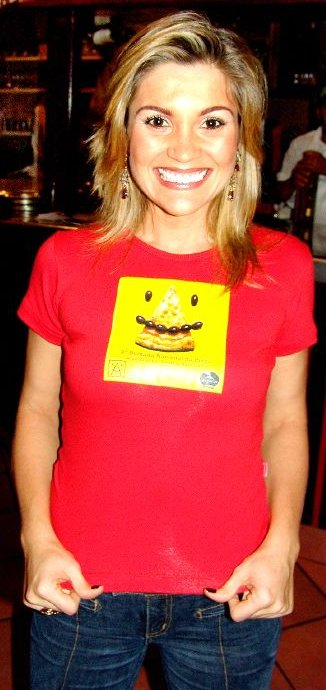
Flávia Alessandra (Sandra)

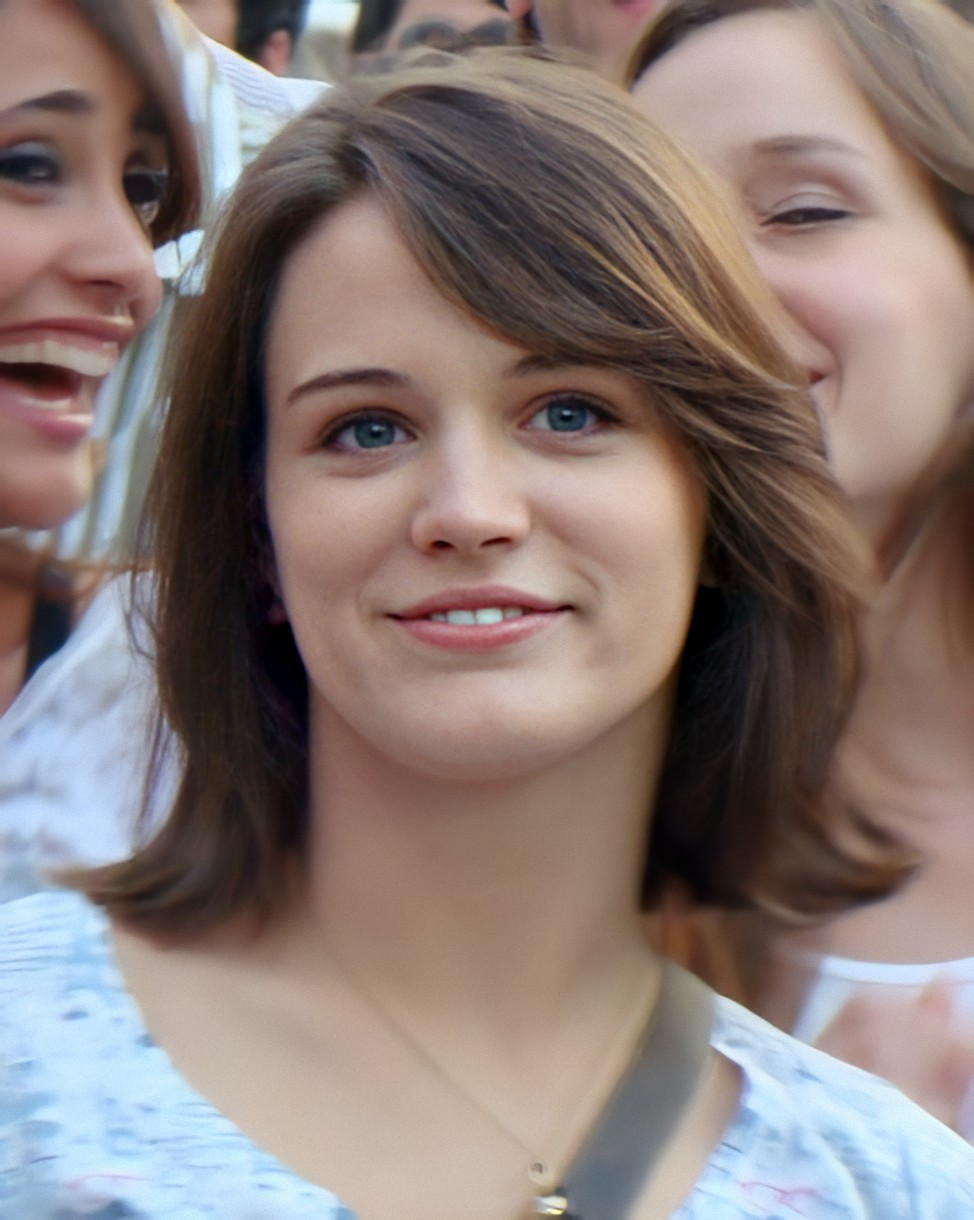
Bianca Bin (Maria)

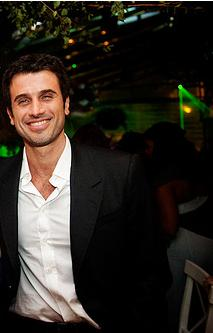
Eriberto Leão (Ernesto)

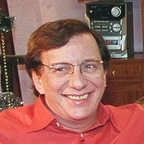
Marco Nanini (Pancrácio / Pandolfo)

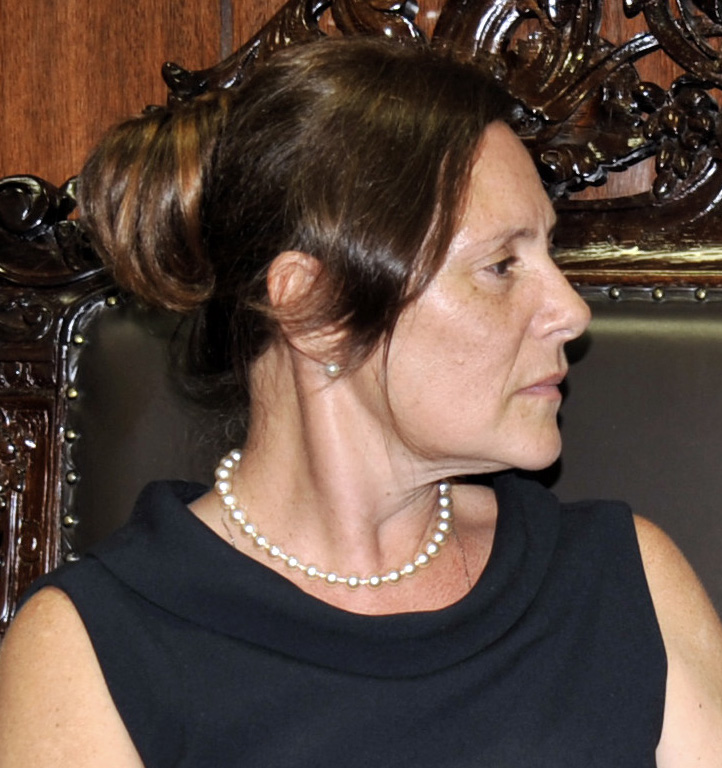
Elizabeth Savalla (Cunegundes)

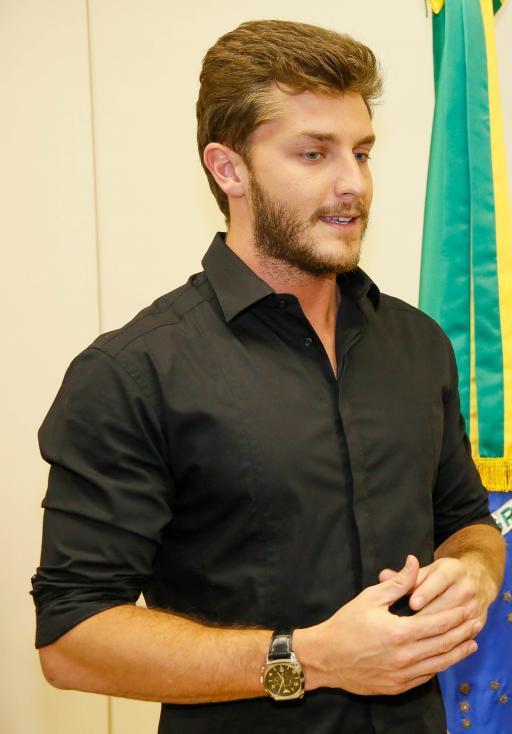
Klebber Toledo (Romeu)

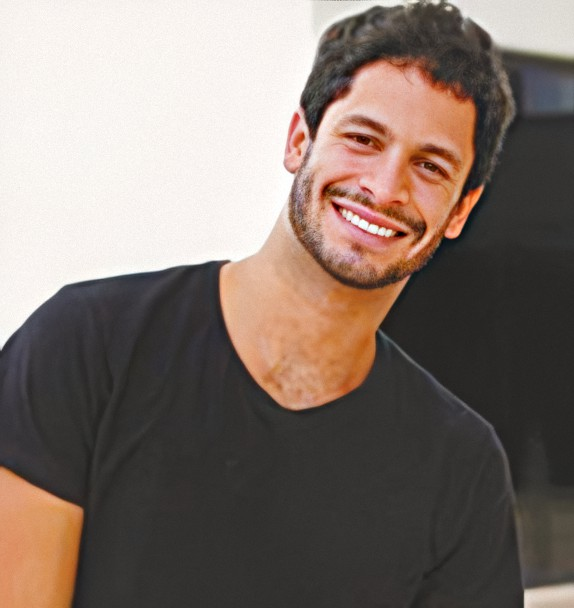
Rainer Cadete (Celso)

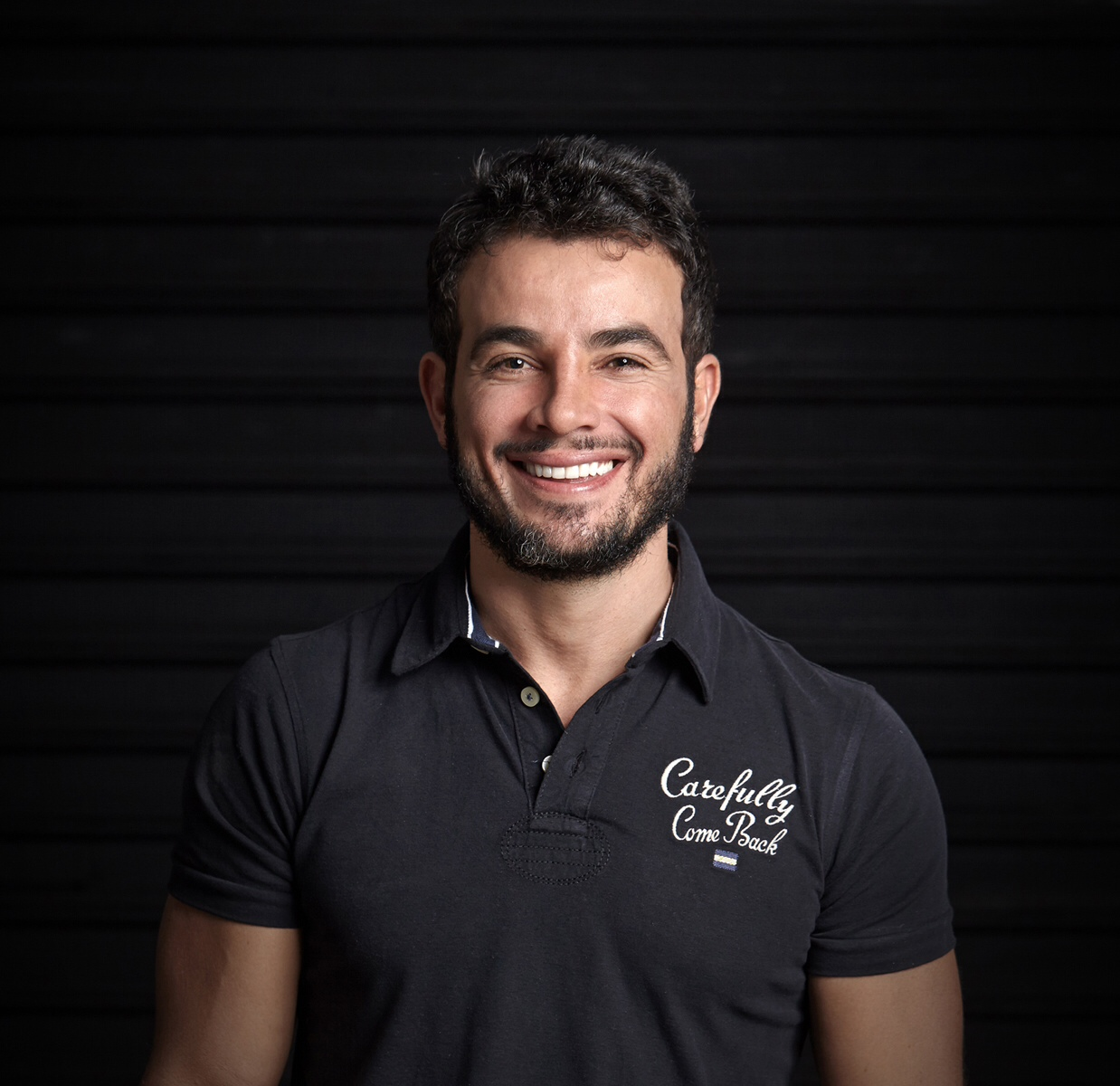
Anderson Di Rizzi (Zé dos Porcos)

Actor/Actress	Character
Sérgio Guizé	Cândido Policarpo Sampaio de Goytacazes / Cândido da Silva (Candinho)
Flávia Alessandra	Sandra Sampaio Carneiro
Débora Nascimento	Filomena Pereira Torres (Filó)
Bianca Bin	Maria Lima
Eriberto Leão	Ernesto Dias
Eliane Giardini	Anastácia Sampaio de Goytacases
Marco Nanini	Pancrácio Martino / Pandolfo Martino
Elizabeth Savalla	Cunegundes Pereira Torres
Priscila Fantin	Diana de Souza Lima
Camila Queiroz	Mafalda Pereira Torres
Klebber Toledo	Romeu Lobato
Ary Fontoura	Joaquim Pereira (Quinzinho)
Maria Zilda Bethlem	Emma
Suely Franco	Paulina
Guilhermina Guinle	Ilde Quintela Araújo
Arthur Aguiar	Osório
Rômulo Neto	Braz Lima
Anderson Di Rizzi	Zé dos Porcos (José Maria da Conceição)
Rainer Cadete	Celso Sampaio Carneiro
Tarcísio Filho	Severo Lima
Miguel Rômulo	Joaquim Pereira Torres Filho (Quincas)
Dhu Moraes	Manoela dos Santos
Flávio Migliaccio	Josias
David Lucas	Jack Fonseca
Débora Olivieri	Ana Lima
Marianna Armellini	Clarice
Flávio Tolezani	Araújo Quintela
Maria Carol	Olga Macedo
Marilu Bueno	Narcisa
Jeniffer Nascimento	Benedita "Dita" dos Santos Pereira
Giovanna Grigio	Gerusa
Rosane Gofman	Olímpia Castelar
Juliane Araújo	Sarita Francis
Kenya Costta	Quitéria
Marcio Tadeu	Rômulo
Marcelo Argenta	Lauro
Rodrigo Andrade	Fábio Costa
Rosi Campos	Eponina Pereira
Ana Lúcia Torre	Camélia
JP Rufino	Pirulito
Nathália Costa	Alice
Xande Valois	Cláudio Quintela Araújo
Claudio Tovar	Evandro
Pedro Brandão	Leandro Costa
Gabriel Canella	Vermelho

=== Special participation ===
Actor/Actress	Character
Nathalia Dill	Anastácia de Goytacases (young)
Natália do Vale	Baronesa de Goytacases
Celso Frateschi	Barão de Goytacases
José Araújo	Capataz do Barão
Luiz Felipe Mendes	Capataz do Barão (young)
Léa Garcia	Parteira de Candinho

== Soundtrack ==
=== Vol. 1 ===
Êta Mundo Bom! - Vol. 1

Soundtrack album by Various artists
- Released: 11 December 2015
- Label: Som Livre

No.	Title	Artist(s)	Length
1.	"O Sanfoneiro Só Tocava Isso"	Suricato
2.	"Pé de Manacá"	Paula Fernandes
3.	"O Que o Ouro Não Arruma"	Daniel
4.	"Dois pra Lá, Dois pra Cá"	Elis Regina
5.	"Se Não Vira Jazz"	Djavan
6.	"Estrada Vermelha"	Victor & Leo
7.	"No Rancho Fundo"	Chitãozinho e Xororó
8.	"A Saudade Mata a Gente"	César Menotti & Fabiano
9.	"Saudade de Minha Terra"	Zé Neto & Cristiano
10.	"Quem Vem de Longe"	Gusttavo Lima
11.	"Avôhai"	Zé Ramalho
12.	"Distante d'Ocê"	Elba Ramalho
13.	"Tico-Tico no Fubá"	Cluster Sisters
14.	"Vem Morena"	Os Gonzagas
15.	"O Samba da Minha Terra"	Elza Soares
16.	"Vida de Bailarina"	Angela Maria
17.	"Dos Meus Braços Tu Não Sairás"	Nelson Gonçalves
18.	"Escandalosa"	Emilinha Borba
19.	"Segredo"	Dalva de Oliveira

=== Vol. 2 ===
Êta Mundo Bom! - Vol. 2

Soundtrack album by Various artists
- Released: 4 March 2016
- Label: Som Livre

No.	Title	Artist(s)	Length
1.	"O Melhor Pra Mim"	Ivete Sangalo
2.	"Felicidade"	Rita Lee
3.	"O Impossível Vem pra Ficar"	Lenine
4.	"Êta Mundo Bão"	Renato Teixeira
5.	"Meu Policarpo"	Sérgio Reis
6.	"Ela é Minha Namorada"	Rodrigo Munar
7.	"Casinha Branca"	Maria Bethânia
8.	"Se Manca"	Ana Carolina
9.	"Dengosa"	Maria Rita
10.	"Atire a Primeira Pedra"	Thiaguinho
11.	"Aquarela do Brasil" (Instrumental)	Ray Conniff
12.	"Anything Goes"	Cole Porter
13.	"Moonlight Serenade" (Instrumental)	Glenn Miller
14.	"Bésame Mucho"	Daniel Boaventura
15.	"Ciúme"	Cídi
16.	"O Amor Não Precisa Razão"	Jussara Silveira
17.	"Tenha Pena de Mim"	Zizi Possi
18.	"Eu Descobri"	Tuta Guedes
19.	"Tudo Que Acontece de Ruim é Para Melhorar"	Moska

== Ratings ==
Timeslot	Episodes	Premiere		Finale		Rank	Season	Rating average
Timeslot	Episodes	Date	Premiere	Date	Finale	Rank	Season	Rating average
Monday—Saturday; 18:30	190	18 January 2016	26	26 August 2016	31	#1	2016	27

On its premiere, Êta Mundo Bom! registered a viewership rating of 25.9 points in Greater São Paulo, while in Rio de Janeiro it registered 29 points, making it the most watched premiere at the timeslot since Araguaia (2010).

As of 6 July, the show had an accumulated viewership of 25.8 points.

Its highest ratings recorded since the first episode is 33 points in São Paulo and 36 points in Rio de Janeiro. On 27 July 2016, the telenovela also recorded a rating, for a 6 pm show, of 34.4, the largest viewership rating since O Profeta (2007).

Preceded by Além do Tempo; 13 July 2015–15 January 2016	Globo 6 p.m. timeslot telenovela 18 January 2016–26 August 2016	Succeeded by Sol Nascente; 29 August 2016–21 March 2017
