= Êta Mundo Melhor! =

Brazilian telenovela

- Also known as: The Best Side of Life!
- Genre: Telenovela
- Created by: Walcyr Carrasco; Mauro Wilson
- Directed by: Amora Mautner
- Starring: Sergio Guizé; Jeniffer Nascimento; David Malizia; Larissa Manoela; Heloísa Périssé; Eriberto Leão; Flávia Alessandra; Rainer Cadete
- Opening theme: "O Sanfoneiro Só Tocava Isso" by Lauana Prado ft. Rodrigo Suricato
- Country of origin: Brazil
- Original language: Portuguese
- No. of seasons: 1
- No. of episodes: 220

Production
- Executive producer: Lucas Zardo
- Producers: Betina Paulon; Isabel Ribeiro
- Production company: Estúdios Globo

Original release
- Network: TV Globo
- Release: 30 June 2025 – 13 March 2026

Related
- The Good Side of Life

The Best Side of Life! (Portuguese: Êta Mundo Melhor!) is a Brazilian telenovela created by Walcyr Carrasco and Mauro Wilson. It is a sequel to the 2016 telenovela The Good Side of Life!. The telenovela aired on TV Globo from 30 June 2025 to 13 March 2026. It stars Sergio Guizé, Jeniffer Nascimento, David Malizia, Larissa Manoela, Heloísa Périssé, Eriberto Leão, Flávia Alessandra and Rainer Cadete.

== Plot ==
Set in 1954, Candinho now lives alone; his mother, Anastácia, passed away after learning that her grandson had been kidnapped by Ernesto, who, having previously been presumed dead following a car accident, also causes Filó's death in a fire. True to his motto, "Everything bad that happens in our lives is for the better", Candinho sets out to find his lost son, aided by his faithful companion, the donkey Policarpo, and his new advisor, Professor Asdrúbal. What Candinho doesn't know is that Júnior, his son, who now goes by the name Samir, was left in an orphanage in São Paulo, run by Zulma, Ernesto's cousin, a swindler and exploitative woman who lives by her wits and will try everything to extort money from Anastácia's heir. Candinho ends up befriending Samir upon arriving in the city, unaware that he is his lost son, and helps him with various life lessons.

However, Candinho will have to deal with new problems in his search for his son. One of them is his cousin Celso. He is bitter after inheriting nothing but a pocket watch from his aunt and finding himself living an unhappy life following Maria’s death, which he witnessed firsthand. Maria recognized Candinho's son in Zulma's arms, and while trying to take the child back, she was hit by a car and died. Celso decides to fight to get his hands on his Candinho's fortune; to that end, he plans to free Sandra from prison. However, Celso sees his plans in jeopardy when he gets close to Estela, the nurse who cared for Maria and to whom the latter entrusted her children. Estela, however, ends up falling in love with Celso, just as he, too, becomes interested in her, but he is consumed by ambition, and the relationship between the two ultimately raises the question of whether it's worth returning to the world of crime to get what he desires. Furthermore, Sandra flees the country with Ernesto's help and takes refuge in Bolivia. A few months later, Sandra returns to São Paulo, having become wealthy after swindling a millionaire she married, vowing to take revenge on Candinho and everyone she claims has humiliated her.

Meanwhile, at the Dom Pedro II Ranch, Dita, after being betrayed by Quincas, can no longer bear Cunegundes’ humiliations and flees to São Paulo to start a new life, along with her aunt Manoela and her son Joaquim. To survive, she becomes a radio singer and eventually rises to prominence, becoming known as one of the queens of song. Candinho hears her singing at a show at the Táxi Dancing and falls in love with her. She is moved by his story and decides to join him in searching for his son, while also helping him avoid falling into new traps, and the two eventually become romantically involved.

== Cast ==
- Sergio Guizé as Cândido Policarpo Sampaio dos Santos / Cândido da Silva "Candinho"
- Jeniffer Nascimento as Benedita "Dita" dos Santos
- David Malizia as Cândido Pereira Sampaio
- Larissa Manoela as Estela
- Heloísa Périssé as Zulma Dias
- Eriberto Leão as Ernesto Dias
- Flávia Alessandra as Sandra Sampaio Carneiro
- Rainer Cadete as Celso Sampaio Carneiro
- Luís Miranda as Professor Asdrúbal
- Elizabeth Savalla as Cunegundes Pereira Torres "Boca de Fogo"
- Ary Fontoura as Joaquim Pereira Torres "Quinzinho"
- Anderson Di Rizzi as José Francisco Leitão "Zé dos Porcos"
- Rosane Gofman as Olímpia Castelar
- Dhu Moraes as Manuela dos Santos
- Miguel Rômulo as Joaquim Pereira Torres Filho "Quincas"
- Maria Carol Rebello as Olga Macedo
- Flávio Tolezani as Dr. Afonso Araújo
- Marcelo Argenta as Lauro Ortiz
- Cleiton Morais as Tobias Assis
- Gabriel Canella as Vermelho
- Fábio de Luca as Detetive Sabiá
- Nívea Maria as Margarida
- Duio Botta as Raul
- Isaac Amendoim as Picolé
- Monique Alfradique as Tamires
- Grace Gianoukas as Medéia Pereira Torres
- Tony Tornado as Lídio
- Castorine as Maria Divina
- Mari Bridi as Mirtes
- Lu Fernandes as Francine
- Kênia Bárbara as Haydée
- Evelyn Castro as Zenaide
- Chico Terrah as Anacleto
- Paula Burlamaqui as Sônia
- Ygor Marçal as Tico
- Vicente Avite

=== Guest stars ===
- Bianca Bin as Maria Lima
- Raissa Xavier

== Production ==
Mauro Wilson was initially scheduled to produce Conta Comigo, a telenovela that would replace Família é Tudo in the second half of 2024. However, in February 2024, Globo decided to suspend production of the telenovela, claiming that the premise of the plot, in which the main antagonist would become a politician after being elected, could have negative repercussions because it coincided with the municipal elections, in order to avoid associations with political figures. Wilson was sent to the "6 PM slot" slot to write a new project to replace Garota do Momento in 2025.

With the positive response to No Rancho Fundo, which was an epilogue to Mar do Sertão, in the "6 PM slot", on 23 April 2024, TV Globo announced the production of a direct sequel to the 2016 telenovela Êta Mundo Bom!. Walcyr Carrasco would continue to be the main author of the plot, resuming his partnership with Amora Mautner. However, the pair would work together until episode 30, while the rest of the telenovela would be written by Mauro Wilson, under the supervision of Carrasco, who would then focus on a "9 PM slot" telenovela, scheduled to premiere in 2026. The telenovela was given the working titles Êta Mundo Bom! 2 and Êta Mundo Bom! – Segunda Temporada, but was eventually titled Êta Mundo Melhor!.

Initially scheduled to premiere on 2 June 2025, Êta Mundo Melhor! was postponed to the 30th due to the extension of Garota do Momento, which by then had become a commercial and critical success, as well as guaranteeing good ratings for the slot. In addition, the drama was having difficulties finalizing its cast after the actors refused to take part due to prior commitments. Salary issues were also pointed out as one of the reasons for the delay in casting and the large increase in refusals from actors from the first part, forcing a change to the original plot. Less than two months before the premiere, the telenovela received 18 more episodes, increasing from 190 to 208, to avoid the final episodes being broadcast during Carnival week, which, according to the broadcaster, could affect the telenovela's ratings.

Filming of the telenovela began on 14 April 2025.

== Ratings ==
Season	Episodes	First aired		Last aired		Avg. viewers (points)
Season	Episodes	Date	Viewers (points)	Date	Viewers (points)	Avg. viewers (points)
1	220	30 June 2025	21.5	13 March 2026	21.3	18.6
