= Reynaldo Gianecchini =

Brazilian actor and former model (born 1972)

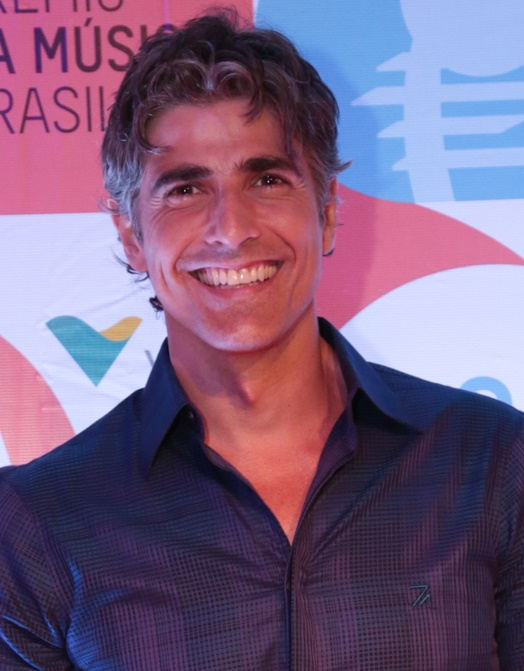
- Gianecchini in May 2014
- Born: Reynaldo Fernandes Cisotto Gianecchini Júnior; 12 November 1972 (age 52); Birigui, São Paulo, Brazil
- Occupations: Actor; model
- Years active: 1991–present (model); 1998–present (actor)
- Spouse: Marília Gabriela (m. 1999; div. 2006)

Reynaldo Fernandes Cisotto Gianecchini Júnior (Portuguese pronunciation: [ʁejˈnawdu ˌʒɐneˈkini]; born 12 November 1972) is a Brazilian actor and model.

== Career ==
Gianecchini began acting at the age of six on the stage of his school in Birigüi, São Paulo. He earned a law degree from the Pontifical Catholic University of São Paulo (PUC-SP) in 1997, although he never practiced law.

His ambition to become an actor was initially postponed by a successful modeling career that spanned eight years, including two years living in Paris. During that time, he also worked in cities such as New York, London, Berlin, and Milan. Despite his success in modeling, Gianecchini felt unfulfilled and decided to return to his original passion for acting.

In 2001, he gained national recognition with his first major television role in the telenovela Laços de Família, playing Edu, a young doctor romantically involved with an older woman, portrayed by actress Vera Fischer.

In 2002, he became the exclusive top model for Armani in Brazil, a role he has reportedly continued to hold. His Esperança co-star Maria Fernanda Cândido was selected as Armani's female equivalent in the country.

== Personal life ==
=== Relationships ===
Gianecchini married journalist, actress and TV presenter Marília Gabriela in 1999. The two met in 1998 and five months later they were living together. The age difference between them – she is 25 years his senior – was the subject of considerable media attention. The couple divorced in 2006.

In an interview with O Globo in September 2019, he stated that although he has dated both women and men, he does not identify as any sexual orientation. In September 2020, he stated that he identifies as pansexual.

=== Health ===
Since August 2011, Gianecchini has been battling against cancer (angioimmunoblastic T-cell lymphoma) and has undergone chemotherapy treatment.

== Filmography ==
=== Television ===
Year	Title	Role	Notes
2000–2001	Laços de Família	Eduardo de Albuquerque Monteiro Fernandes (Edu)	
2001–2002	As Filhas da Mãe	Ricardo Brandão	
2001	Sítio do Picapau Amarelo	Himself	Episode: "A Festa da Cuca"
2002–2003	Esperança	Antônio Bellini (Tony)	
2002	Sai de Baixo	Marlon Brandson	Episode: "O Último Golpe do Arouche"
2003	Casseta & Planeta, Urgente!	Dr. Gianecologista	Episode dated 12 August 2003
2003	Mulheres Apaixonadas	Ricardo	Episode dated 11 October 2003
2004	Da Cor do Pecado	Paco Lambertini/Apolo Sardinha	
2005–2006	Belíssima	Pascoal da Silva	
2005	A História de Rosa	Zeca	Television special
2005	Clara e o Chuveiro do Tempo	Santos-Dumont	Miniseries
2006	Lu	Edílson	Television special
2007–2008	Sete Pecados	Dante Florentino	
2008	O Natal do Menino Imperador	Dom Pedro I	Television special
2010–2011	Passione	Frederico Lobato Filho (Fred)	
2012	Cheias de Charme	Himself	Episode dated 13 July 2012
2012–2013	Guerra dos Sexos	Orlando Cardoso (Nando)	
2014	Em Família	Cadú Fernandes	
2015	Verdades Secretas	Anthony Mariano	
2016–2017	A Lei do Amor	Pedro Guedes Leitão	
2019	A Dona do Pedaço	Régis Mantovani	
2022	Good Morning, Verônica	Matias Cordeiro	

=== Film ===
Year	Title	Role	Notes
2002	Avassaladoras	Thiago	
2005	Robots	Rodney Copperbottom (voice)	Brazilian Portuguese dub
2007	Primo Basílio	Jorge	
2008	Sexo com Amor?	Rafael	
2008	Entre Lençóis	Roberto	
2009	Divã	Théo	
2009	Flordelis: Basta uma Palavra para Mudar	Alex	
2013	Se Puder... Dirija!	André	
2014	S.O.S. Mulheres ao Mar	André	
2015	S.O.S. Mulheres ao Mar 2	André	
2016	My Hindu Friend	Ricardo Steen	
2017	Diminuta	Cristiano	

== Theater ==
- Cacilda
- Boca de Ouro
- O Príncipe de Copacabana
- A Peça Sobre o Bebê
- Vossa Excelência, o Candidato
- Doce Deleite
- Cruel
- A Toca do Coelho
- Os Guardas de Taj

== Music ==
- "Você" (with Marília Gabriela)
