= Sérgio Guizé =

Brazilian actor (born 1980)

Sergio Guizé
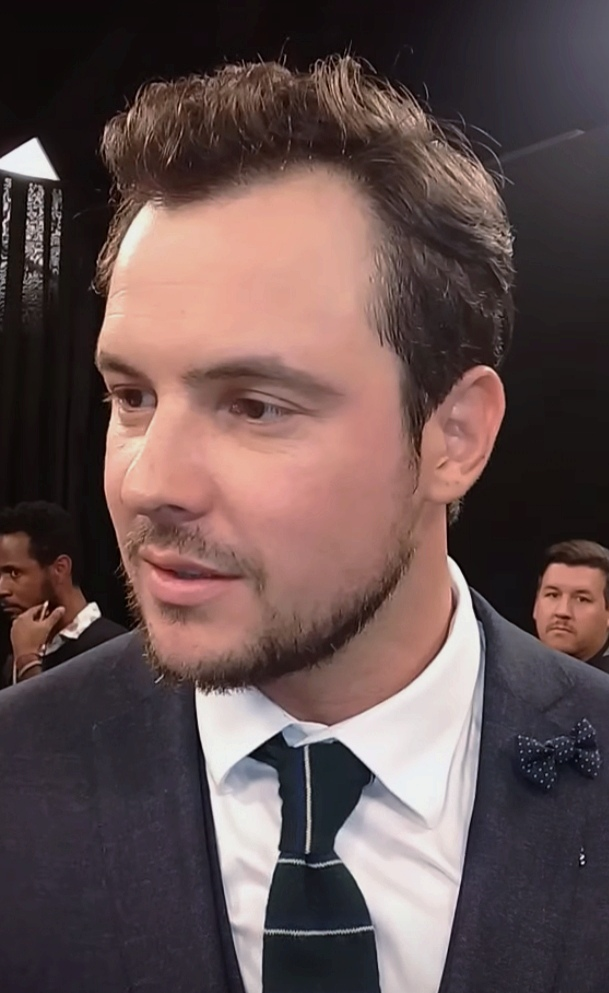
- Sergio Guizé (2018)
- Born: Sergio Tadeu Corrêia Guizé; 14 May 1980 (age 45); Santo André, São Paulo, Brazil
- Occupations: Actor; singer; composer; Multi-instrumentalist
- Years active: 1998–present
- Height: 1.88 m (6 ft 2 in)
- Partner: Bianca Bin (m. 2018)

Sergio Tadeu Corrêia Guizé (born 14 May 1980) is a Brazilian actor, singer, composer and multi-instrumentalist.

== Filmography ==
=== Television ===
Year	Title	Role	Notes
2001	Pícara Sonhadora	Leandro	
2004	Da Cor do Pecado	Guilherme / Bernardo	Episodes: "July 9–August 18"
2008	Por Toda Minha Vida	Olavo de Barros	Episode: "Dolores Duran"
2009	Caminho das Índias	Jefferson	Episode: "March 19"
2010	9mm: São Paulo	Felipe	Episode: "Garoto Problema"
2011	Tapas & Beijos	Lorraine	Episode: "O Carteado"
2012	Sessão de Terapia	Breno Dantas	Season 1
2013	O Negócio	Client	Episode: "Share of Wallet"
2013	Saramandaia	João Evangelista Viana "João Gibão"	
2014	Alto Astral	Dr. Carlos Henrique Bittencourt "Caíque"	
2016	Êta Mundo Bom!	Cândido Policarpo Sampaio "Candinho"	
2017	O Outro Lado do Paraíso	Gael Montserrat	
2018	Popstar	Participante	Season 2
2019	Elis: Viver é Melhor que Sonhar	Tom Jobim	Episode: "January 8"
2019	A Dona do Pedaço	Ricardo Martins Ramirez "Chiclete"	
2021	Verdades Secretas II	Ariel Nolasco	
2022	Mar do Sertão	José Paulino Ribeirão Mendes "Zé Paulino" / José Mendes	
2023	Elas por Elas	Átila Pompeu / Herbert	Episodes: "September 25–27"
2024	Elas por Elas	Átila Pompeu / Herbert	Episode: "March 15"
2024	The Others	Paulo Correia	Season 2
2025	Êta Mundo Melhor!	Cândido Policarpo Sampaio "Candinho"	

=== Film ===
Year	Title	Role	Notes
2007	O Crime do Pato Branco	Bento	Short film
2009	Até o Fim do Dia	João	Short film
2009	Tempos de Aquário	Fernando	
2009	Os Inquilinos	Moacir	
2009	Quanto Dura o Amor?	Caio	
2011	Bruna Surfistinha	Rodrigo Pacheco	
2011	Onde Está a Felicidade?	Juninho	
2012	O Diário de Simonton	Simonton	Short film
2012	Macbeto	Beto	
2013	Vai que Dá Certo	Traffic boss	
2013	O Abismo Prateado	João	
2016	Uma Loucura de Mulher	Dr. Paulo Raposo	
2016	BR716	Sílvio	
2018	Mulheres Alteradas	Eduardo Fonseca (Dudu)	
2018	Além do Homem	Alberto Luppo	
2018	O Homem Perfeito	Carlos Henrique Costa (Caíque)	
2019	Beatriz: Entre a Dor e o Nada	Marcelo	
2021	Terapia do Medo	Dr. Bruno Weber	
2022	O Amante de Júlia	Lucas	
2022	Me Tira da Mira	Roberto	
2022	The Bad Guys	Mr. Snake	Brazilian Dubbing

== Awards and nominations ==
Year	Awards	Category	Nominated work	Result	Ref
2013	Prêmio Extra de Televisão	Best Male Revelation	Saramandaia	Nominated	
2013	Melhores do Ano	Best Male Revelation	Saramandaia	Nominated	
2013	Retrospectiva UOL	Best Male/Female Revelation	Saramandaia	Nominated	
2013	Prêmio Quem de Televisão	Best Television Actor l	Saramandaia	Nominated	
