= O Outro Lado do Paraíso =

Brazilian telenovela by Walcyr Carrasco

- Also known as: The Other Side of Paradise
- Genre: Telenovela
- Created by: Walcyr Carrasco
- Directed by: Mauro Mendonça Filho; André Felipe Binder
- Starring: Bianca Bin; Sérgio Guizé; Glória Pires; Marieta Severo; Rafael Cardoso; Grazi Massafera; Thiago Fragoso; Lima Duarte; Fernanda Montenegro; Eliane Giardini; Érika Januza; Eriberto Leão; Julia Dalavia; Ellen Rocche; Juca de Oliveira; Bárbara Paz; Emílio de Mello
- Opening theme: "Boomerang Blues" by Renato Russo
- Country of origin: Brazil
- Original language: Portuguese
- No. of episodes: 172 (120 on the International version)

Production
- Production locations: Tocantins; Rio de Janeiro
- Camera setup: Multi-camera

Original release
- Network: TV Globo
- Release: 23 October 2017 – 11 May 2018

O Outro Lado do Paraíso (title in English: The Other Side of Paradise) is a Brazilian telenovela created by Walcyr Carrasco, which premiered on TV Globo on 23 October 2017, replacing A Força do Querer, and ended on 11 May 2018, being replaced by Segundo Sol.

The telenovela features an ensemble cast headed by Bianca Bin, Sérgio Guizé, Rafael Cardoso, Grazi Massafera, Érika Januza, Emílio de Mello, Thiago Fragoso, Glória Pires, Marieta Severo and Fernanda Montenegro.

== Plot ==
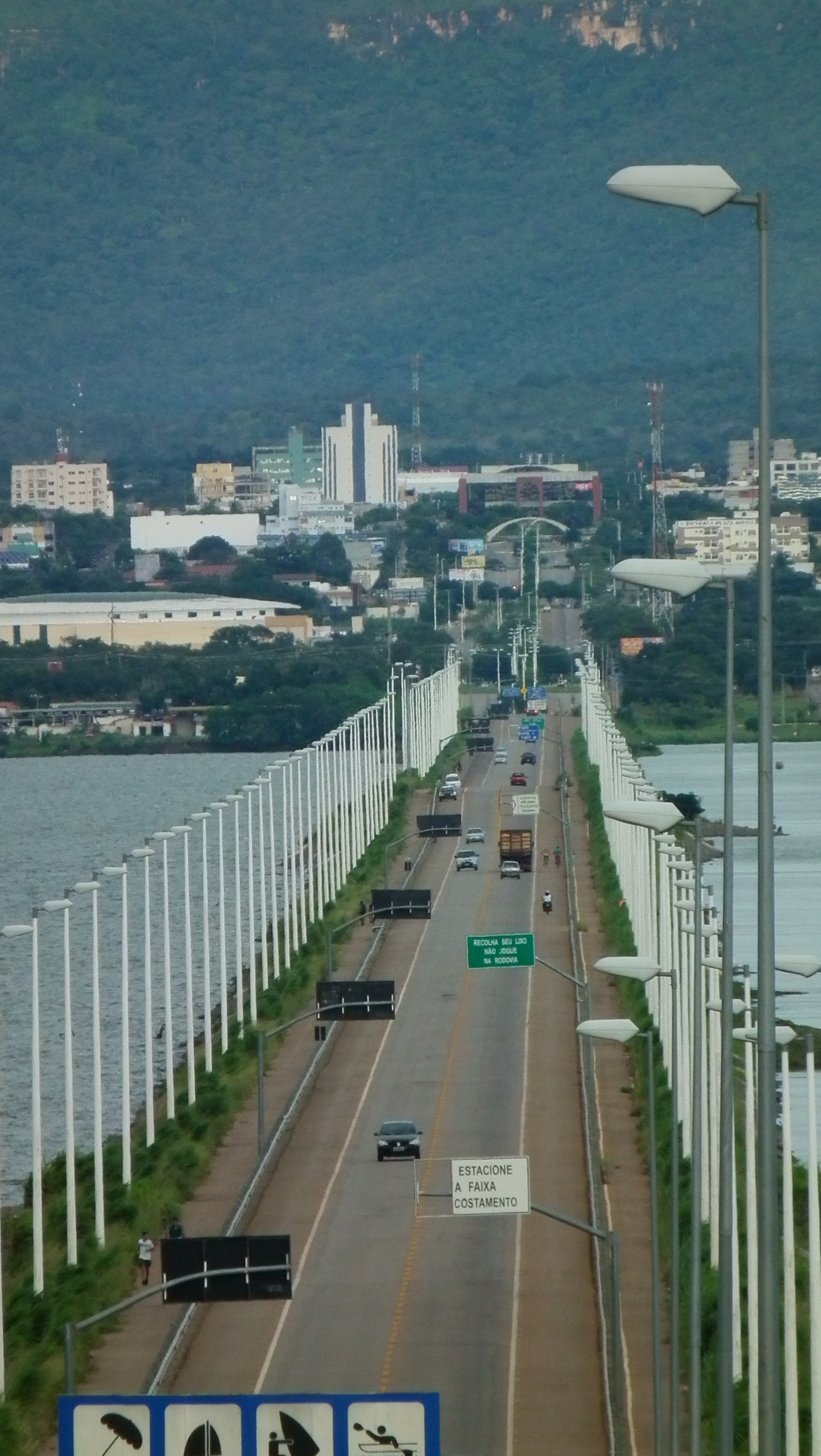
Palmas, in Tocantins, is one of the main scenarios of the plot.

The plot has two phases and begins in Tocantins. The first phase, set in 2007, presents the teacher Clara (Bianca Bin), an innocent young orphan who lives with her grandfather, a bar owner Josafá (Lima Duarte) in Jalapão. She meets Gael (Sergio Guizé), an heir to a decaying family of Palmas, and ends up falling in love with him. However, Clara suffers from his explosive and extremely sexist temper and but ends up being advised by Sophia (Marieta Severo), her mother-in-law, to be understanding. Behind Sophia's demureness, which is just a facade, hides an ambition for the lands of Josafá, where a depleted emerald mine has been discovered, in which neither he nor his granddaughter have the least interest in exploiting after a tragedy that causes Clara's father and son of Josafá, Jonas (Eucir de Souza) to perish. Sophia, a domineering, self-willed, cunning and false woman, plans a plan to get rid of Clara, eventually putting her daughter-in-law in a psychiatric clinic for 10 years.

The second phase, set in the present time, presents Clara trying to escape from the psychiatric clinic, without understanding how she got there, but discovers she was the victim of a major coup. She meets with the mysterious Beatriz (Nathalia Timberg), her only friend. He meets Renato (Rafael Cardoso), a friend in love with her, who will help her in her revenge plan against seven people: Sophia, Gael, the sensual and dangerous sister-in-law Livia (Grazi Massafera), Judge Gustavo (Luís Melo) and his wife Nádia (Eliane Giardini), psychiatrist Samuel (Eriberto Leão) and delegate Vinicius (Flávio Tolezani), while trying to find again her son Tomaz (Vitor Figueiredo), father and grandmother, some of Clara's foes.

== Production ==
Cauã Reymond and Carolina Dieckmann were featured main roles in the plot, but the first declined because of movie commitments, while Dieckmann preferred to accept an invitation to the next telenova by Aguinaldo Silva. Both were replaced by Rafael Cardoso and Grazi Massafera. Nathalia Dill was invited shortly afterwards for the role, but also refused, claiming that she needed time to rest her image since she had just starred in 'Rock Story'. Maitê Proença was one of those who left the cast later. The actress Laís Pinho was announced for the cast of the plot, but in August it was announced that she would act in the next telenovela by Record, O Apocalipse.

The release of a part of the plot synopsis caused some estrangement from the resemblance to the American soap opera La Patrona. Both have in common the fact that the girl is hospitalized in a psychiatric clinic by the villain of the plot.

== Cast ==
- Bianca Bin as Clara Tavares
- Sérgio Guizé as Gael Montserrat
- Marieta Severo as Sophia Montserrat
- Glória Pires as Elizabeth Montserrat
- Rafael Cardoso as Renato Laureiro
- Grazi Massafera as Lívia Montserrat
- Lima Duarte as Josafá Tavares
- Fernanda Montenegro as Mercedes Alcântara
- Thiago Fragoso as Patrick de Sá Junqueira
- Eliane Giardini as Nádia Vasconcelos
- Caio Paduan as Bruno Vasconcelos
- Érika Januza as Raquel Custódio
- Nathalia Timberg as Beatriz de Sá Junqueira
- Juliano Cazarré as Mariano
- Flávio Tolezani as Vinicius Gomes
- Eriberto Leão as Samuel dos Passos
- Luís Melo as Gustavo Vasconcelos
- Julia Dalavia as Adriana Montserrat
- Emílio de Mello as Henrique Montserrat
- Juca de Oliveira as Natanael Montserrat
- Bárbara Paz as Joana Medeiros
- Laura Cardoso as Madame Caetana
- Zezé Motta as Mãe Quilombo
- Anderson di Rizzi as Juvenal
- Pedro Carvalho as Amaro Antunes
- Arthur Aguiar as Diego Vasconcelos
- Genésio de Barros as Raúl Ignácio Barros
- Juliana Caldas as Julia de Aguiar Monserrat
- Ana Lúcia Torre as Adneia dos Passos
- Tainá Müller as Aura
- Ellen Rocche as Suzana
- Fábio Lago as Nick
- Mayana Neiva as Leandra
- Bella Piero as Laura Sandoval
- Rafael Zulu as Aparecido
- Fernanda Rodrigues as Fabiana de Sá Junqueira
- Igor Angelkorte as Rafael
- Giovana Cordeiro as Cleo Alcântara
- Sandra Corveloni as Lorena Sandoval
- Vera Mancini as Rosalinda
- Sérgio Fonta as Amaral
- Malu Rodrigues as Karina
- César Ferrario as Rato
- Felipe Titto as Odilo
- Narjara Turetta as Zildete
- Alexandre Rodrigues as Valdo
- Rafael Losso as Zé Victor
- Ilva Niño as Sebastiana Almeida (Tiana)

== Soundtrack ==
=== Volume 1 ===
O Outro Lado do Paraíso: Vol 1

Soundtrack album by Various artists
- Released: 10 November 2017
- Length: 57:51
- Label: Som Livre

O Outro Lado do Paraíso Vol. 1 is the first soundtrack of the telenovela, released on 10 November 2017 by Som Livre.

No.	Title	Artist(s)	Length
1.	"Boomerang Blues"	Renato Russo	3:31
2.	"Who Do You Love"	George Thorogood	4:22
3.	"I Don't Wanna Talk About It"	Fernanda Takai	3:29
4.	"Vou Te Encontrar"	Paulo Miklos	4:35
5.	"Triste, Louca ou Má"	Francisco, el Hombre feat. Labaq, Helena Maria, Salma Jo & Renata Essis	4:26
6.	"K.O."	Pabllo Vittar	2:36
7.	"Crystalised"	The XX	3:22
8.	"Na Real"	Jammil	3:48
9.	"Ai de Mim"	OutroEu feat. Sandy	4:17
10.	"Você Não Sabe (Quero Ver)"	Bruna Viola	3:25
11.	"Bilu Bilu"	Pablo	3:33
12.	"Hold On"	Alabama Shakes	3:47
13.	"O Caçador de Esmeralda"	João Bosco	4:13
14.	"Morro Velho"	Elis Regina	4:48
15.	"Clube da Esquina N.º 2 – Instrumental"	Milton Nascimento	3:39
Total length:			57:51

=== Volume 2 ===
O Outro Lado do Paraíso: Vol 2

Soundtrack album by Various artists
- Released: 20 February 2018
- Length: 71:56
- Label: Som Livre

O Outro Lado do Paraíso Vol. 2 is the second soundtrack of the telenovela, released on 20 February 2018 by Som Livre.

No.	Title	Artist(s)	Length
1.	"Blaze of Glory"	Bon Jovi	5:38
2.	"Que Yo Te Vea"	Roberto Carlos	3:03
3.	"Aliança"	Tribalistas	3:55
4.	"Weird Fishes / Arpeggi"	Radiohead	5:18
5.	"From The Beginning"	Emerson, Lake & Palmer	4:14
6.	"Smother"	Daughter	4:01
7.	"Complicated"	Eric Silver	3:19
8.	"Eu Quero Sempre Mais (Somebody Like You)"	João Gabriel	3:46
9.	"Abrigo"	Roberta Campos	3:44
10.	"Bicho Feio"	Renato Teixeira & Almir Sater	3:28
11.	"Garoto de Aluguel"	Leonardo	5:48
12.	"La Gozadera"	Gente de Zona Feat. Marc Anthony	3:24
13.	"That Smell"	Lynyrd Skynyrd	7:27
14.	"Did You Hear The Rain?"	George Ezra	2:57
15.	"Cold Feet"	Fink	5:26
16.	"Amuleto"	Tiê	3:28
17.	"Tocando Em Frente"	Anavitória	3:00
Total length:			71:56

== Ratings ==
Timeslot (BRT/AMT)	Episodes	First aired		Last aired		Avg. viewers (points)
Timeslot (BRT/AMT)	Episodes	Date	Viewers (points)	Date	Viewers (points)	Avg. viewers (points)
Monday–Saturday 9:20pm	172	23 October 2017	35	11 May 2018	48	38

== Awards and nominations ==
Year	Awards	Category	Recipient	Result	Ref.
2018	Troféu Internet	Best actress	Glória Pires	Nominated	

Year	Awards	Category	Recipient	Result	Ref.
2018	Troféu Imprensa	Best actress	Glória Pires	Nominated	
2019	Troféu Imprensa	Best telenovela	Walcyr Carrasco	Won	

Year	Awards	Category	Recipient	Result	Ref.
2018	Prêmio Jovem Brasileiro	Best actress	Bianca Bin	Nominated	

Year	Awards	Category	Recipient	Result	Ref.
2018	Prêmio Nelson Rodrigues	Best Theme Issued	Bella Piero	Won	

Year	Awards	Category	Recipient	Result	Ref.
2018	Melhores do Ano	Best Actor	Sérgio Guizé	Won	
2018	Melhores do Ano	Best Actress	Bianca Bin	Nominated	
2018	Melhores do Ano	Best Actress Breakthrough	Bella Piero	Won	
2018	Melhores do Ano	Character of the Year	Fernanda Montenegro	Won	
2018	Melhores do Ano	Best Supporting Actor	Juliano Cazarré	Nominated	
2018	Melhores do Ano	Character of the year	Marieta Severo	Won	
2018	Melhores do Ano	Best Revelation Actor	Anderson Tomazini	Nominated	
