= Flávia Alessandra =

Brazilian actress (born 1974)

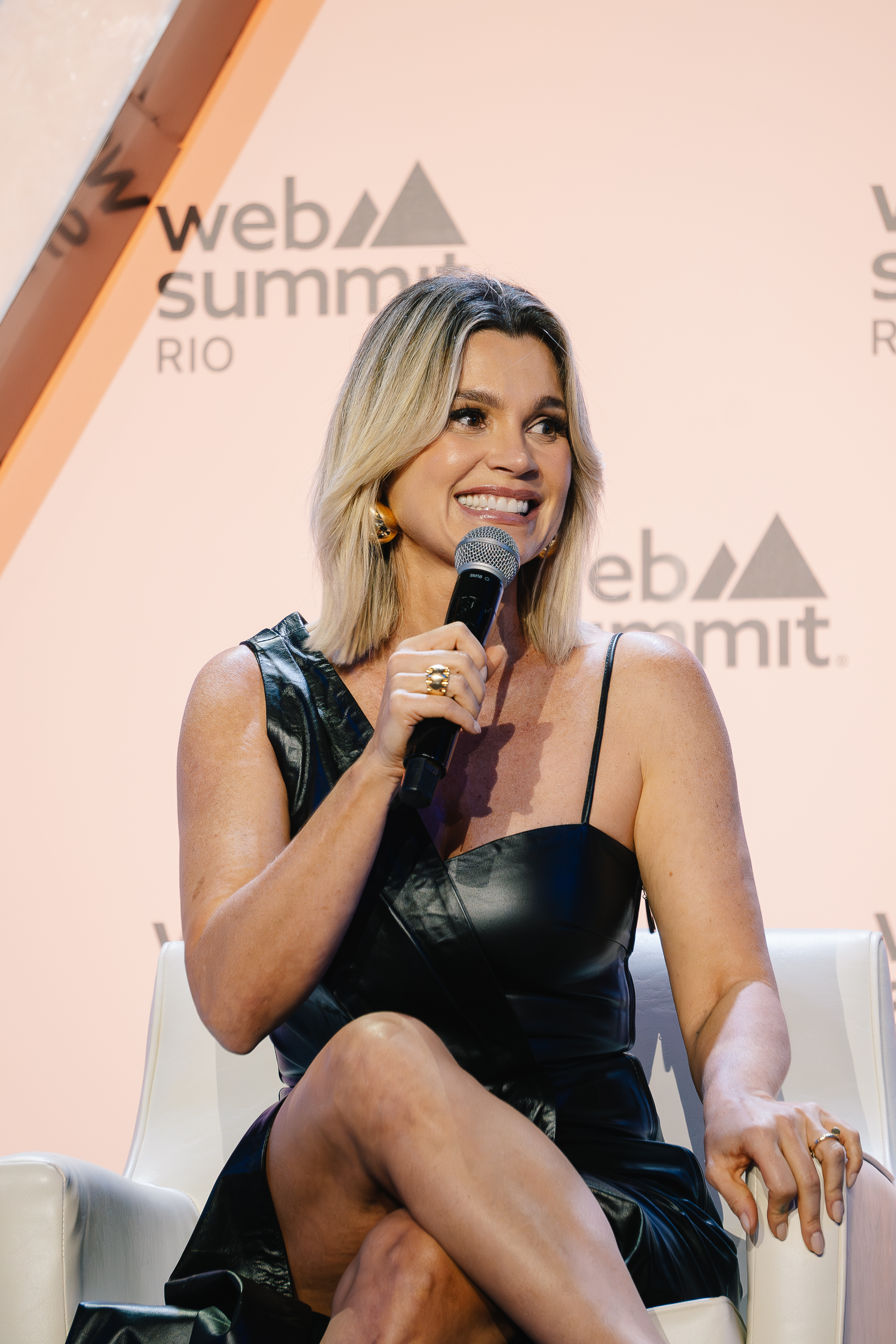
- Alessandra at the Web Summit Rio in 2024
- Born: Flávia Alessandra Martins da Costa; 7 June 1974 (age 52); Rio de Janeiro, Brazil
- Citizenship: Brazil; Portugal
- Education: Rio de Janeiro State University
- Occupation: Actress
- Years active: 1989–present
- Spouses: Marcos Paulo (m. 1997; div. 2002) Otaviano Costa (m. 2006)
- Children: 2

Flávia Alessandra Martins da Costa (born 7 June 1974) is a Brazilian actress, best known for roles in both telenovelas, television series and films.

== Biography ==
Flávia Alessandra Martins da Costa was born on 7 June 1974, and she is the daughter of Raquel and Hélio Martins. She is the youngest child of her three brothers. She was born in Arraial do Cabo, state of Rio de Janeiro. She has two daughters: Giulia Martins (from her marriage with Marcos Paulo) and Olívia Costa (from her marriage to Otaviano Costa).

She also has acquired Portuguese citizenship thanks to her Portuguese paternal grandfather, who was from Ponte de Lima.

== Career ==
She debuted in the television with the telenovela Top Model (1989), and in the competition of the Domingão do Faustão staying in the first place, and leaving Adriana Esteves and Gabriela Duarte, in the second and third places, respectively. In the end, the three participated in the novela. In 2001 she had her first protagonist role scheduled for the 9pm timeslot as Lívia Proença de Assunção in Porto dos Milagres, a telenovela created by Aguinaldo Silva and Ricardo Linhares. In 2002 she portrayed her Lívia again, the protagonist of the O Beijo do Vampiro. In the year 2005 she played the antagonist Cristina in Alma Gêmea. The telenovela was well highlighted as it is one of Brazilian telenovelas to possess a great audience. In 2006 to 2007 she played Vanessa in Pé na Jaca. The show gained so much success that it even launched cloth line and other accessories for the feminine population. In 2007, she played Alzira in Aguinaldo Silva's Duas Caras. In 2009, she played protagonist in Caras & Bocas together with Malvino Salvador. In 2011, she returned to the small screen in Morde & Assopra portraying to roles: Naomi (a human) and Naomi (a robot). In 2012, she starred in the primetime telenovela Salve Jorge playing Érika. In 2014, she portrayed Heloísa, the mother of the protagonist Líli portrayed by Juliana Paiva. In 2016, she played the main antagonist Sandra in Êta Mundo Bom!.

== Filmography ==
=== Television ===
Year	Title	Role	Notes
1989	Top Model	Tânia	
1990	Mico Preto	Francisca	
1993	Sonho Meu	Inês	
1994	Pátria Minha	Cláudia	
1995	História de Amor	Soninha	
1997	A Indomada	Dorothy Williams Mackenzie	
1998	Meu Bem Querer	Lívia Maciel	Main Antagonist
2000	Aquarela do Brasil	Beatriz	
2000	Você Decide	Herself	Episode: "Aluga-se uma Aliança"
2001	Porto dos Milagres	Lívia Proença de Assunção / Iemanjá	Protagonist
2002	O Beijo do Vampiro	Lívia / Princesa Cecília	Protagonist
2004	Da Cor do Pecado	Lena	Special appearance
2004	Carga Pesada	Catarina	Episode: "Vítimas do Silêncio"
2004	Linha Direta		Episode: "Crime das Irmãs Poni"
2004	Sítio do Picapau Amarelo	Branca Flor	Special appearance
2004	A Diarista	Diana/Silvana	Episodes: "Separações" / "Aquele da Amante"
2005	Alma Gêmea	Cristina Ávilla Saboya	Main Antagonist
2006	Pé na Jaca	Vanessa Fortuna	Co-protagonist
2006	Minha Nada Mole Vida		Episode: "Olha o Carnavalzeta Aí, Gente!"
2006	Os Amadores	Camila	Special appearance
2007	Duas Caras	Alzira Valente (Alzirão)	
2008	Casos e Acasos	Gilda	Episode: "O Teste, o Gato e o Rejeitado"
2008	Nada Fofa	Solange da Conceição	
2009	Caras & Bocas	Dafne Bastos Conti da Silva	Protagonist
2010	Ti Ti Ti	Herself	Special appearance
2011	Morde & Assopra	Naomi Gusmão / Naomi Robô	Co-protagonist
2012	Salve Jorge	Érica Castro	Co-protagonist
2013	Além do Horizonte	Heloísa Barcelos	Co-protagonist
2016	Êta Mundo Bom!	Sandra Sampaio Carneiro	Main Antagonist
2020	Salve-se Quem Puder	Helena Furtado Santamarina	
2024	Família é Tudo	Herself	Special appearance
2025	Êta Mundo Melhor!	Sandra Sampaio Carneiro	
2026	Quem Ama Cuida	Fábia Brandão	

=== Film ===
Year	Title	Role
2006	No Meio da Rua	Márcia
2006	The Wild	Bridget (Portuguese voice-over translation)
2007	O Homem que Desafiou o Diabo	Mother Pantanha
2010	De Pernas pro Ar	Daniele
2011	Não Se Preocupe, Nada Vai Dar Certo	Flora
2013	Nelson Ninguém	Cindy Love
2017	Polícia Federal: A Lei É para Todos	Beatriz
2018	Incredibles 2	Evelyn Deavor (Portuguese voice-over translation)
2022	Turning Red	Ming Lee (Portuguese voice-over translation)

== Awards and nominations ==
Year	Awards	Category	Nominated work	Result	Ref.
2002	Prêmio Contigo! de TV	Best in Romance	Porto dos Milagres	Nominated	
2005	Prêmio Extra de Televisão	Best Actress	Alma Gêmea	Nominated	
2006	Prêmio Contigo! de TV	Best Actress	Alma Gêmea	Nominated	
2006	Prêmio Qualidade Brasil	Best Actress	Alma Gêmea	Nominated	
2007	Prêmio Contigo! de TV	Best Supporting Actress	Pé na Jaca	Nominated	
2007	Prêmio Qualidade Brasil	Best Supporting Actress	Pé na Jaca	Nominated	
2008	Prêmio Contigo! de TV	Best Supporting Actress	Duas Caras	Nominated	
2009	Prêmio Extra de Televisão	Best Actress	Caras & Bocas	Nominated	
2009	Prêmio Qualidade Brasil	Best Supporting Actress	Caras & Bocas	Nominated	
