= Guerra dos Sexos (2012 TV series) =

Brazilian telenovela

- Also known as: Fight or Love?
- Genre: Telenovela; Romantic comedy
- Created by: Silvio de Abreu
- Based on: Guerra dos Sexos by Silvio de Abreu
- Directed by: Jorge Fernando
- Starring: Irene Ravache; Tony Ramos; Gloria Pires; Reynaldo Gianecchini; Mariana Ximenes; Edson Celulari
- Opening theme: "Guerra dos Sexos" by The Originals
- Country of origin: Brazil
- Original language: Portuguese
- No. of episodes: 179; 120 (international version)

Production
- Camera setup: Multi-camera
- Running time: 60 minutes

Original release
- Network: TV Globo
- Release: 1 October 2012 – 26 April 2013

Guerra dos Sexos (Fight or Love?) (Note: Official name in English.) is a Brazilian telenovela produced and aired by TV Globo, from 1 October 2012 to 26 April 2013, replacing Cheias de Charme and later replaced by Sangue Bom. It is written by Silvio de Abreu and directed by Jorge Fernando.

While Gloria Pires, Edson Celulari, Mariana Ximenes and Reynaldo Gianecchini the protagonists, while Bianca Bin, Paulo Rocha and Mayana Moura the Main antagonists, counted on Drica Moraes, Eriberto Leão, Luana Piovani, Tony Ramos and Irene Ravache play in the leading roles.

== Synopsis ==
The plot revolves around the fierce competition between men and women in the 21st century. Set in São Paulo, it tells the story of cousins and Octavius II Charlô II, becoming heirs of fortune uncles and Charlô Octavius, who die and leave all the inheritance for cousins like Uncle Enrico did with them. The cousins end up being forced to split the fortune of his uncles, including the network of shops and the famous Charlô's Little Castle, building based on European castles where Octavius and Charlô they settled.

The hide is that the two had a passion in youth, and that after a fight, made them enemies of each other. While Charlô a woman is fun, colorful and determined, Octavius is a tough man, extremely sexist and believes that women should never work with men. Charlô, in turn, became early adoptive mother of Philip. Man womanizer, have an affair with Vanya hidden, right-hand Charlô and his coworker's Charlô stores in which employees of the same sex can not have romantic involvement. Felipe also collects ex-wives, of whom is the father of Analu a rebellious and spoiled girl who gets involved with the honest Nando, 5 a man who works as correct chauffeur of Octavian. Felipe is still the father of Juliana, a young responsible and determined as the grandmother, full of attitude, but however, keep an extra-marital affair with Fabio, disputed photographer Manuela married to a rich and elegant woman who suffers with his sickly jealous by her husband.

Another parallel plot is Roberta Leone. Elegant, cultured and modern, Roberta becomes millionaire widow of Victor Leone, owner of clothing label Positano, and who is the mother of Kiko, a young and clumsy nerd who suffers a heartbreak with Analu, daughter of Felipe. With the sudden death of Victor, Roberta chairs the store, a fact that infuriates Octavius, socio half the shares and hoped to drive the brand. To overthrow Roberta, Octavian has the help of Veruska, secretary of Victor, who is willing to pass secret information to him. Roberta, however, relies on the help of Charlô, making its dispute with Octavius increasingly intense. When widow, Roberta Leone falls for Nando, but ends up having conflicts with her son Kiko because this guilt by Nando amorosa.6 and also his disappointment with his sister and his brother Nieta Nene who accuse Nando to be an explorer of woman.

Nieta is hardworking and ambitious sister Roberta. Unlike her sister, is poor and lives in a humble village in the neighborhood of Mooca. Nieta always charge for marrying the poor Dino, an honest man who works as a shareholder in the shops of Victor. Nieta and Dino are the parents of Carolina, a young woman who pretends to be sweet and kind, but in reality is a demon in search of wealth and power, longing to marry a wealthy and successful and for that, she chooses Fabio solving destroy his marriage to Manuela. Meanwhile, Carolina dating Ulysses, quarrelsome man, but a good heart, who works in the stores Charlô's as shipper and always handled by Carolina, which for him is an angel. Carolina, however, is in love with Zenon, younger brother of Odysseus, who longs to be an MMA fighter. Still in the plot, have Nene, brother of Nieta fifties and Roberta, who like her sister, want to grow in life and become a successful personality.

Nando is the driver of Octavian, is confidant, ally and close friend of the boss. Lives in the house of his friend Ulysses, and after some confusion, gets involved with Analú, daughter of Felipe. Nando, but is blindly in love with the sister Analú the centered Juliana. Over time, the simpleton driver ends up relating to Roberta Leone, which opens the door to a successful modeling career for Nando, that even involved with the entrepreneur, keep thinking in your great love, Juliana.

== Cast ==
| Actor | Role |
|---|---|
| Irene Ravache | Charlotte de Alcântara Pereira Barreto (Charlô II/Cumbuqueta/Altamiranda) |
| Glória Pires | Roberta Leone |
| Tony Ramos | Otávio de Alcântara Rodrigues e Silva (Otávio II/Bimbinho/Dominguinhos) |
| Reynaldo Gianecchini | Fernando Cardoso (Nando) |
| Bianca Bin | Carolina Carneiro |
| Edson Celulari | Felipe de Alcântara Pereira Barreto (Pimpinho) |
| Mariana Ximenes | Juliana de Alcântara Pereira Barreto |
| Luana Piovani | Vânia Trabucco de Moraes |
| Eriberto Leão | Ulisses da Silva |
| Drica Moraes | Nieta Carneiro |
| Paulo Rocha | Fábio Marino |
| Guilhermina Guinle | Manoela Vasconcellos Marino |
| Fernando Eiras | Dinorah Carneiro (Dino) |
| Daniel Boaventura | Nenê Stalone |
| Mayana Moura | Veruska Maldonado |
| Thiago Rodrigues | Zenon da Silva |
| Marianna Armellini | Afrodite da Silva (Frô) |
| Johnny Massaro | Kiko Leone |
| Thalita Lippi | Lucilene |
| Raquel Bertani | Analú de Alcântara Pereira Barreto |
| Antônia Morais | Isadora Novaes |
| Jesus Luz | Ronaldo Brandão |
| Marilu Bueno | Olívia |
| Débora Olivieri | Semíramis da Silva |
| Ronnie Marruda | Baltazar |
| Hilda Rebello | Tia |
| Marcelo Barros | Montanha Duncrezio |
| Maria Carol | Dalete |
| Thaís Portinho | Divina |
| Jesuela Moro | Ciça Marino |
| Carlos Alberto Riccelli | Vitório Leone |

== Ratings ==
| Timeslot | # Eps. | Premiere | | Finale | | Rank | Season | Average viewership |
| Timeslot | # Eps. | Date | Viewers (in points) | Date | Viewers (in points) | Rank | Season | Average viewership |
|---|---|---|---|---|---|---|---|---|
| Monday—Saturday; 7:30 pm | 179 | 1 October 2012 | 28 | 26 April 2013 | 28 | #1 | | 22.8 |

== Notes ==
| Preceded by Cheias de Charme; 16 April 2012–28 September 2012 | Globo 7 p.m. timeslot telenovela 1 October 2012–26 April 2013 | Succeeded by Sangue Bom; 29 April 2013–1 November 2013 |
