= Angela (2023 film) =

- Theatrical release poster
- Directed by: Hugo Prata
- Written by: Duda de Almeida
- Produced by: Hugo Prata; Fabio Zavala
- Starring: Isis Valverde
- Cinematography: Paulo Vainer
- Edited by: Tiago Feliciano
- Music by: Otavio de Moraes
- Production company: Bravura Cinematográfica
- Distributed by: Downtown Filmes
- Release dates: August 12, 2023 (Gramado); September 7, 2023 (Brazil)
- Running time: 104 minutes
- Country: Brazil
- Language: Portuguese

Angela is a 2023 Brazilian drama film directed and produced by Hugo Prata & written by Duda de Almeida. It stars Ísis Valverde accompanied with Gabriel Braga Nunes, Bianca Bin, Emílio Orciollo Netto, Chris Couto, Gustavo Machado, Carolina Manica and Alice Carvalho. It is inspired by the life and murder of Minas Gerais mining socialite Ângela Diniz.

== Synopsis ==
After a tumultuous separation and having to give up custody of their three children, famous socialite Ângela Diniz meets Raúl and thinks she has found someone who loves her free spirit as much as she does. The overwhelming attraction made the couple drop everything and live the dream of rebuilding their passion-filled lives in the beach house. But the quiet life is quickly transformed when Raúl begins to show himself as an aggressive, violent and controlling man. The relationship ends in abuse and violence, leading to one of the most famous murder cases of all time in Brazil.

== Cast ==
- Ísis Valverde as Angela
- Gabriel Braga Nunes as Raul
- Bianca Bin as Tóia
- Emílio Orciollo Netto as Moreau
- Chris Couto as Maria
- Gustavo Machado as Ibrahim
- Carolina Manica as Adelita
- Alice Carvalho as Lili

== Release ==
Angela had its world premiere on August 12, 2023, at the 51st Gramado Film Festival. It was scheduled to be released commercially on August 31, 2023, in Brazilian theaters, but it was delayed to September 7 of the same year.
