= Ângela Diniz =

Brazilian socialite

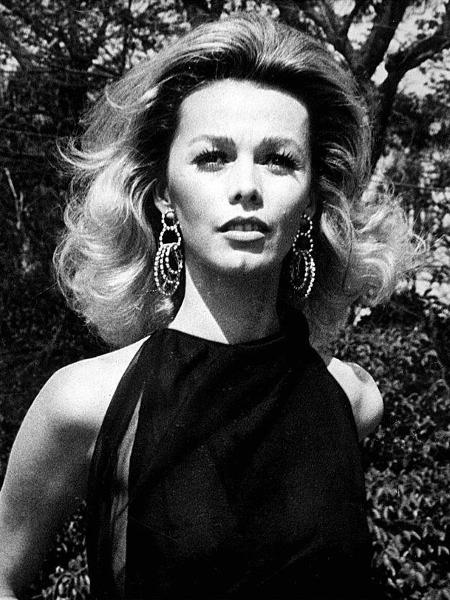
- Born: 10 November 1944
- Died: 30 December 1976 (aged 32); Armação dos Búzios, Brazil
- Cause of death: Homicide, feminicide
- Citizenship: Brazil
- Parent(s): Newton Viana Diniz; Maria do Espírito Santo Fernandes Diniz

Ângela Maria Fernandes Diniz (10 November 1944 – 30 December 1976) was a Brazilian socialite who became famous after she was murdered at her own beach house in Praia dos Ossos, Búzios, Rio de Janeiro by her lover, Raul Fernandes do Amaral Street (commonly known as Doca Street). The crime received extensive media coverage in Brazil.

== Life ==
Ângela Diniz married engineer Milton Villas Boas when she was 18, and divorced nine years later after having three children with him. She later dated gossip columnist Ibrahim Sued, starting in 1975—it was her last relationship before dating Doca Street.

In 1975, she was accused of doing and keeping drugs, and, immediately after, kidnapping her own daughter.

In 1976, while spending some time at their beach house in Búzios, Doca and Ângela had an argument, and she threw his briefcase at him. His Beretta pistol tumbled from it, and he picked it up and used it to shoot her dead in a rage.

== In the media ==
Angela's life was considered for a movie to be directed by Roberto Farias, with Deborah Secco on the lead role, but it was never produced.

Part of her story is told on the book Submundo da sociedade, by Adelaide Carraro.

In 2006, Doca Street published a book called Mea Culpa, in which he explains in detail how he met Angela, how they started an extramarital affair, how he left his wife and children to live with Ângela, and how he killed her.

In 2020, Praia dos Ossos, a podcast about the case, was released.

Diniz was portrayed by Ísis Valverde in the 2023 biographical film Angela. She was also portrayed by Marjorie Estiano in the 2024 biographical television series Ângela Diniz: Assassinada e Condenada.
