= Mayana Moura =

Brazilian actress and former model (born 1982)

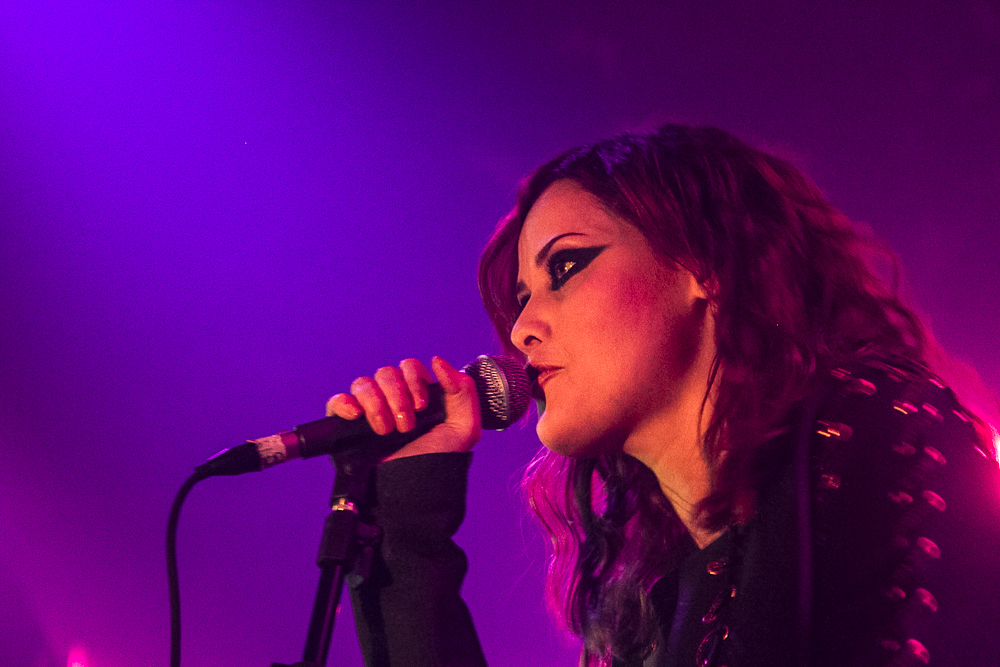
- Born: August 29, 1982 (age 42); Rio de Janeiro, Brazil
- Occupation: Actress
- Height: 5 ft 8 in (1.73 m)

Mayana Moura (born August 29, 1982) is a Brazilian actress and former model.

== Filmography ==
=== Film ===
Year	Title	Role	Notes
2006	14 Bis	Gisele	Short film
2008	Eletrotorpe	Clara	Short film
2010	Elvis e Madona	Cândida	
2013	Time and the Wind	Luzia Cambará	

=== Television ===
Year	Title	Role	Notes
2006	Minha Nada Mole Vida	Karen Brigida	Episode: "Que Vença o Melhor"
2008	Casos e Acasos	Penélope	Episode: "O Teste, o Gato e o Rejeitado"
2010	Passione	Melina Gouveia	
2011	Força-Tarefa	Vivian	Episode: "O Rio é uma Festa"
2012	Guerra dos Sexos	Veruska Maldonado	
2014	O Tempo e o Vento	Luzia Cambará	
2015	Buuu - Um Chamado Para a Aventura	Orinde	
2017	Tempo de Amar	Carolina Delamare de Sobral	
2018	Jesus	Satan / Jasmine	

== Personal life ==
She was in a relationship with English actor Matt Smith from 2008 to 2009.
