= Passione (TV series) =

- Genre: Telenovela
- Created by: Sílvio de Abreu
- Written by: Sílvio de Abreu
- Directed by: Denise Saraceni
- Starring: Fernanda Montenegro; Tony Ramos; Mariana Ximenes; Reynaldo Gianecchini; Carolina Dieckmann; Bianca Bin; Rodrigo Lombardi
- Opening theme: Aquilo que dá no Coração by Lenine
- Country of origin: Brazil
- Original language: Portuguese
- No. of episodes: 209 {Original Version}

Production
- Production locations: São Paulo - Brazil, Tuscany - Italy
- Camera setup: Multiple-camera setup
- Running time: 60 minutes

Original release
- Network: TV Globo
- Release: May 17, 2010 – January 14, 2011

Passione is a Brazilian telenovela that originally aired on TV Globo from May 5, 2010, to January 14, 2011. It was created and written by Sílvio de Abreu.

The plot has the actors Fernanda Montenegro, Tony Ramos, Mariana Ximenes, Reynaldo Gianecchini, Carolina Dieckmann, Rodrigo Lombardi, Marcello Antony, Larissa Maciel, Bianca Bin, Werner Schünemann, Mayana Moura and Aracy Balabanian in the leading roles.

Starring a host of TV Globo's most renowned actors, the telenovela centers on family relationships in Brazil and Italy and the secrets pertaining the characters.

Replacing Viver a Vida, it premiered on May 5, 2010, and ended its run on January 14, 2011, consisting of 209 episodes.

== Cast ==
Actor - Actress	Character
Fernanda Montenegro	Elizabeth "Bete" Gouveia
Mariana Ximenes	Clara Miranda Medeiros Mattoli
Tony Ramos	Antônio "Totó" Mattoli
Carolina Dieckmann	Diana Rodrigues
Marcello Antony	Gerson Gouveia
Rodrigo Lombardi	Mauro Santarém
Maitê Proença	Stela Gouveia
Reynaldo Gianecchini	Frederico 'Fred' Lobato
Cauã Reymond	Danilo Gouveia
Werner Schünemann	Saulo Gouveia
Vera Holtz	Maria Candelária "Candê" Lobato
Mayana Moura	Melina Gouveia
Larissa Maciel	Felícia Lobato
Daisy Lúcidi	Valentina Miranda
Marcelo Médici	Carmelo "Mimi" Melatto
Kayky Brito	Sinval Gouveia
Tammy Di Calafiori	Lorena Gouveia
Kate Lyra	Myrna
Júlio Andrade	Arthur Melo Peixoto 'Arthurzinho'
Bianca Bin	Fátima Gouveia Lobato
Cleyde Yáconis	Brígida Gouveia
Daniel Boaventura	Diogo Dias
Francisco Cuoco	Olavo da Silva
Bruno Gagliasso	Berilo Rondelli
Gabriela Duarte	Jéssica da Silva Rondelli
Irene Ravache	Clotilde da Silva 'Clô'
Alexandra Richter	Jaqueline "Jackie" Mourão da Silva
Simone Gutierrez	Luridinha
Leandra Leal	Agostina Mattoli
Daniel de Oliveira	Agnello Mattoli
Miguel Roncato	Alfredo Mattoli
Edoardo Dell'Aversana	Dino Mattoli
Aracy Balabanian	Gemma Mattoli
Marcella Valente	Francesca Mattoli
Emiliano Queiroz	Benedetto Melatto
Carol Macedo	Kelly Miranda

== Brazil viewership ratings ==
Timeslot	# Ep.	Premiere		Finale		Rank	TV Season	Average viewership
Timeslot	# Ep.	Date	Premiere ratings (in points)	Date	Finale ratings (in points)	Rank	TV Season	Average viewership
Monday to Saturday 9:15 PM	209	May 10, 2010	37	January 14, 2011	52	#1	2010-11	35

== Awards ==
- Seoul International Drama Awards - Best Series Drama

=== International Broadcasting ===
- Brazil – Rede Globo / May 17, 2010 – January 14, 2011
- Portugal – RTP Internacional / 2011-2012
- Portugal – SIC / 2011–2012
- Albania – Top Channel / July, 2011 – March 30, 2012
- Kosovo – RTV21
- Bosnia and Herzegovina – RTRS
- Armenia – Armenia TV
- Kenya – Ebru Africa / July 20, 2015 – present

Preceded by Viver a Vida; 2010	Globo 9 P.M. timeslot telenovela May 17, 2010–January 14, 2011	Succeeded by Insensato Coração; 2011
