= Eriberto Leão =

Brazilian actor (born 1972)

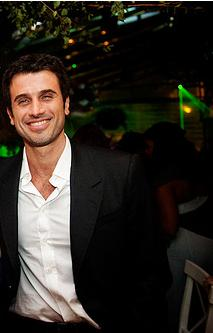
- Leão in 2010
- Born: Eriberto de Castro Leão Monteiro; 11 June 1972 (age 54); São José dos Campos, São Paulo, Brazil
- Education: University of São Paulo; Lee Strasberg Theatre and Film Institute
- Occupation: Actor
- Years active: 1996–present
- Spouse: Andréa Leal (m. 2010; div. 2018)
- Partner: Suzana Alves (1999–2004)
- Children: 2

Eriberto de Castro Leão Monteiro (born 11 June 1972) is a Brazilian actor.

== Biography ==
Eriberto was born in São José dos Campos, in the interior of the state of São Paulo. He is the son of the designer Telma de Castro Leão Monteiro and the businessman Eriberto Monteiro.

== Filmography ==
Film
Year	Title	Role	Notes
2012	De Pernas pro Ar 2	Ricardo	
2011	Federal Bank Heist	Mineiro	

TV
Year	Title	Role	Notes
2025-2026	Êta Mundo Melhor!	Ernesto Dias	
2024-2025	Mania de Você	Robson	
2022	Além da Ilusão	Leônidas	
2019	Ilha de Ferro	Diogo Bravo	Season 2
2016	Êta Mundo Bom!	Ernesto Dias	
2014-2015	Malhação	Gael Duarte	Season 22
2012-2013	Guerra dos Sexos	Ulisses da Silva	
2011	A Vida da Gente	Gabriel	
2011	Malhação	Himself	Guest; Season 19
2011	Insensato Coração	Pedro Alencar Brandão	
2009	Paraíso	José Eleutério Ferrabraz "(Zeca/Devil's son")	
2008	Casos e Acasos	Henrique / Erasmo / Cadu	Episodes: "O ex, a promoção e o vizinho" "A foto, a troca e o furto" "A câmera escondida, o porta-"mala" e o chá de fralda"
2007-2008	Duas Caras	Ítalo Negroponte	
2006	Por Toda Minha Vida	César Camargo Mariano	Episode: "Elis Regina"
2006	Sinhá Moça	Rafael/Dimas	
2004	Cabocla	Tomé	
1997	O Amor Está no Ar	João Amaral Leite	
