= Bella Piero =

Brazilian actress

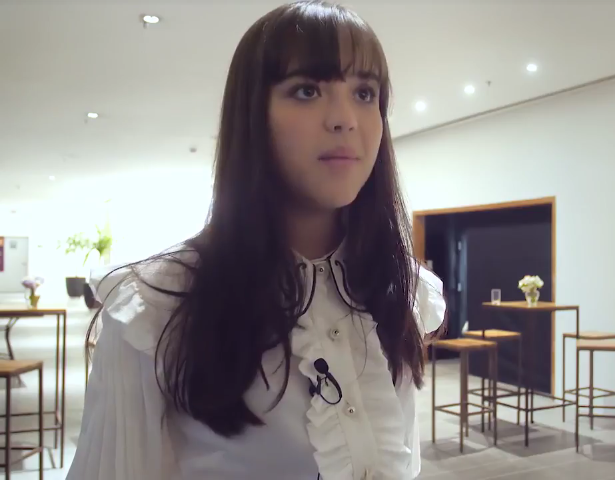
- Born: Izabella Carneiro de Campos Pieruccetti; 6 January 1996 (age 29); Rio de Janeiro, Brazil
- Occupation: Actress
- Years active: 2007–present

Bella Piero is a Brazilian actress, best known for her work in the soap operas, "Verdades Secretas" and "O Outro Lado do Paraíso". On the big screen, she played "Virginia," the protagonist of Caroline Fioratti's film "My Drywall Cocoon," which will have its global première in the SXSW Film Festival in March 2023.

== Biography ==
She started studying theater at the age of seven at CAL, having the stage as the basis of her training, where she worked in about ten plays until she was seventeen. She studied with Roberta Carreri (Odin Teatret), Butoh's workshop with Cecil Gil and Celeste Noah, and in other workshops with Eduardo Milewicz, Lee Strasberg Method with Estrela Straus, among others.

Her last play was David Harrower's Blackbird, directed by Bruce Gomlesvky.

In 2014, Bella did her first audiovisual work, at the Macrossérie, "Verdades Secretas", as Nina, a rebellious teenager, directed by Mauro Mendonça Filho.

In 2015, she was the young protagonist of her first feature, "Ninguém entra Ninguém sai" as "Bebel", directed by Hsu Chein.

In 2016, she appeared in the soap opera "A lei do amor" as the shameless "Xanaia" directed by Denise Saraceni.

Between 2017 and 2018, she appeared in the soap opera "O Outro Lado do Paraíso" as "Laura", a survivor of child sexual abuse. Her acting earned her the Nelson Rodrigues award, for the best approached theme and the best revelation actress award, from Domingão do Faustão 2018. With that, she was invited to be ambassador of the Ela Decide campaign, a UN+ UNFPA BRAZIL initiative.

In 2019, she filmed in the still unpublished film, by filmmaker Arnaldo Jabor, called "Meu último Desejo," where she played "Lu", the Doctor's caregiver, who dreams of being a great actress.

Bella portrayed "Virginia" in Caroline Fioratti's film in 2020.

The second season of André Felipe Binder's "Aruanas" on Globoplay features Piero. It is about an activist NGO that looks into pollution problems in the interior of So Paulo, where the main character, "Raquel," resides.

In 2022, she was invited by Greenpeace to visit a community in the Rio Negro Sustainable Development Reserve.

== Filmography ==
=== Television ===
Year	Title	Role
2014	Em Família	Marcinha
2014	Boogie Oogie	Paula
2015	Verdades Secretas	Nina
2016	A Lei do Amor	Xanaia
2017	O Outro Lado do Paraíso	Laura Sandoval
2018	Malhação: Vidas Brasileiras	Sofia
2019	Eu, a Vó e a Boi	Bruque Tyler da Cunha
2021	Aruanas	Raquel
2025	Garota do Momento	Flora

=== Film ===
Year	Title	Role	Notes
2017	Ninguém Entra Ninguém Sai	Bebel	Main cast
2021	Tudo Errado	Bebel	Protagonist
2023	My Drywall Cocoon	Virginia	Protagonist
2025	Meu Último Desejo	Lu	Protagonist

== Theater ==
Year	Title
2007	O Dragão Verde
2010	O Boto Cor-de-rosa
2010	Quem Não Tem Cão, Caça Com Gato
2010	Quem Conta Um Conto Aumenta Um Ponto
2011	Era Uma Vez
2012	Era uma vez um homem que ainda sonhava
2012	Encontro Amado
2012	Cena Familiar
2013	Frankenstein – O Musical Infantil
2014	Blackbird

== Awards and nominations ==
Year	Ceremony	Category	Work	Result	Ref.
2018	Grande Prêmio do Cinema Brasileiro	Best Supporting Actress	Ninguém Entra, Ninguém Sai	Nominated	
2018	Prêmio Nelson Rodrigues	Best Topic Covered	O Outro Lado do Paraíso	Won	
2018	Melhores do Ano	Revelation Actress	O Outro Lado do Paraíso	Won	
2018	Prêmio Contigo! Online	Best Revelation Actress	O Outro Lado do Paraíso	Won	
2019	Troféu Internet	Revelation	O Outro Lado do Paraíso	Nominated	
