= Bianca Bin =

Brazilian actress (born 1990)

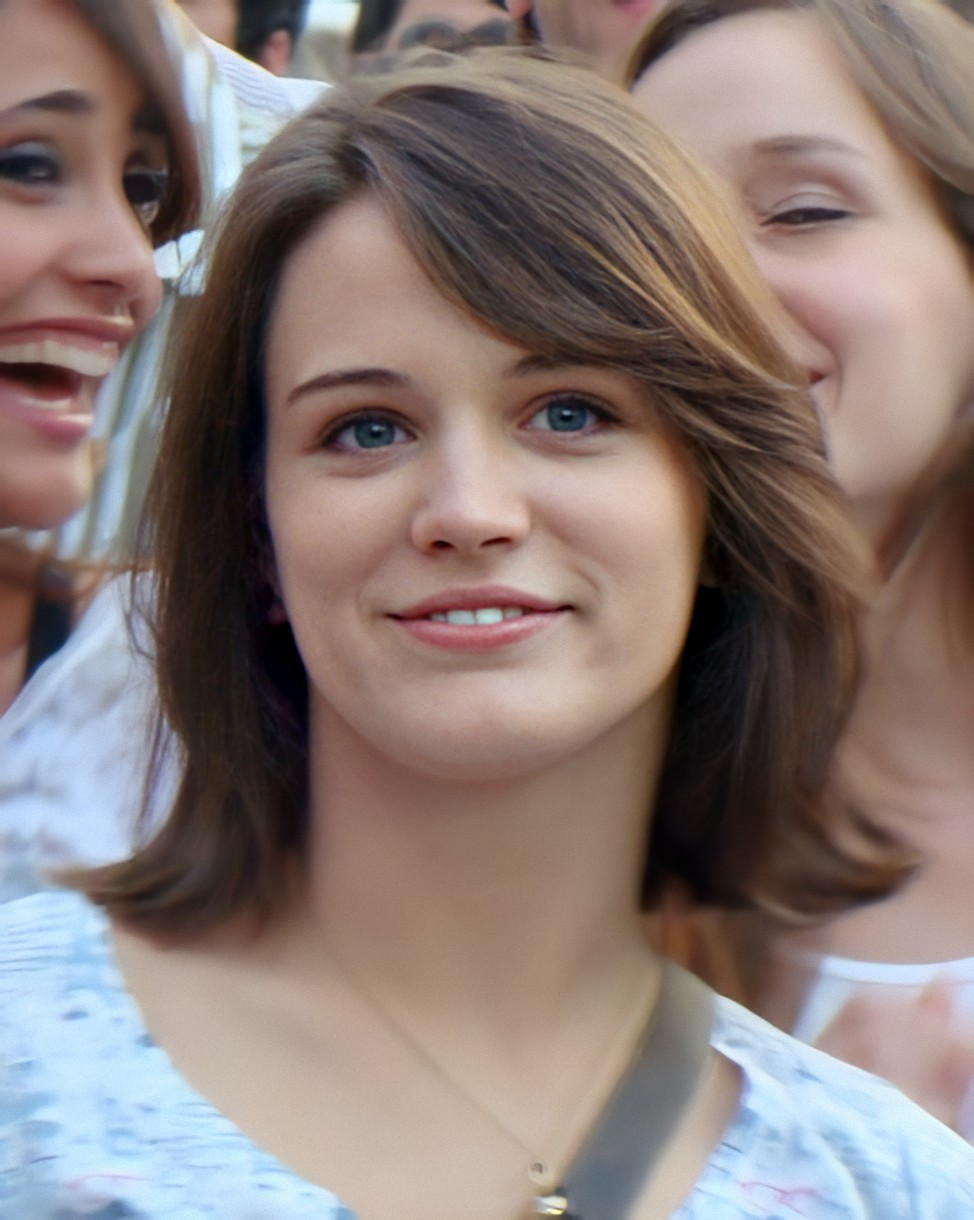
- Bianca Bin in 2015
- Born: 3 September 1990 (age 35); Jundiaí, São Paulo, Brazil
- Occupation: Actress
- Years active: 2009–present
- Spouses: Pedro Brandão (m. 2012; div. 2017) Sergio Guizé (m. 2018)

Bianca Franceschinelli Bin (born 3 September 1990) is a Brazilian actress.

== Early life ==
Bianca is from the city of Jundiaí in the interior of the State of São Paulo, and moved with three months of age to Itu, also in the interior of São Paulo, where she was raised.

== Career ==
She played the lead role, Marina, in the 2009 season of Malhação. After leaving Malhação, she played popular character Fátima in Rede Globo's telenovela Passione. Her character was involved in a romantic relationship with Cauã Reymond's character in that telenovela.

She played the lead role in the 2011 Rede Globo's telenovela Cordel Encantado, replacing actress Paola Oliveira who chose to work in another Rede Globo telenovela, Insensato Coração. In Cordel Encantado, she worked for the second time with Cauã Reymond, who played her character's romantic interest. Her character is named Açucena Bezerra, and is also a princess. She played a villain named Carolina in the 2012 telenovela Guerra dos Sexos. Bin also portrayed the lead role in the 2013 Rede Globo telenovela Joia Rara as Amélia. She starred as the villain Vitória in the telenovela Boogie Oogie. She plays a pregnant woman named Maria in the 2016 telenovela Êta Mundo Bom!. Currently, she is playing Clara the main protagonist in the telenovela O Outro Lado do Paraíso. She is working the second time with the actors Sérgio Guizé, Eliane Giardini and Arthur Aguiar.

== Filmography ==
=== Television ===
Year	Title	Role	Notes
2009	Malhação	Marina Vidal Monteiro Miranda / Penelope Valentina	Season 16
2010	Passione	Fátima Lobato Gouveia	
2011	Cordel Encantado	Açucena Bezerra (Princess Aurora Catarina de Ávila)	
2012	Guerra dos Sexos	Carolina Carneiro	
2013	Joia Rara	Amélia Fonseca Hauser	
2014	Boogie Oogie	Vitória Veiga e Azevedo Fraga / Vitória Miranda Romão	
2016	Êta Mundo Bom!	Maria Lima	
2017	Segredos de Justiça	Mariana Freitas / Raquel da Silva	Episode: "Nem Tudo é Verdade"
2017	O Outro Lado do Paraíso	Clara Tavares	
2022	Cine Holliúdy	Francisca	
2023	Terra e Paixão	Agatha La Selva	Episodes: "8 May" "3 July" "23–24 August"
2025	Êta Mundo Melhor!	Maria Lima	Special appearance
2026	Dona Beja	Angélica Felizardo Sampaio	
2026	Colônia	TBA	Season 2

=== Film ===
Year	Title	Role
2018	Canastra Suja	Emília
2022	Assalto na Paulista	Leona
2022	As Verdades	Francisca
2022	O Amante de Júlia	Júlia
2023	Angela	Tóia

== Awards and nominations ==
=== Melhores do Ano ===
Year	Category	Nominated	Result	Ref.
2010	Best actress revelation	Passione	Nominated	
2018	Best Actress	O Outro Lado do Paraíso	Nominated	

=== Prêmio Quem de Televisão ===
Year	Category	Nominated	Result	Ref.
2013	Best actress	Joia Rara	Nominated	

=== Prêmio Contigo! de TV ===
Year	Category	Nominated	Result	Ref.
2012	Best telenovela actress	Cordel Encantado	Nominated	
2013	Best supporting actress	Guerra dos Sexos	Nominated	
2014	Best telenovela actress	Joia Rara	Nominated	
2015	Best actress	Boogie Oogie	Nominated	

=== Prêmio Jovem Brasileiro ===
Year	Category	Nominated	Result	Ref.
2018	Best actress	O Outro Lado do Paraíso	Nominated	

=== Troféu Internet ===
Year	Category	Nominated	Result	Ref.
2019	Best actress	O Outro Lado do Paraíso	Nominated	

=== Prêmio Extra de Televisão ===
Year	Category	Nominated	Result	Ref.
2018	Best Actress	O Outro Lado do Paraíso	Nominated	
