= Walcyr Carrasco =

Brazilian writer (born 1951)

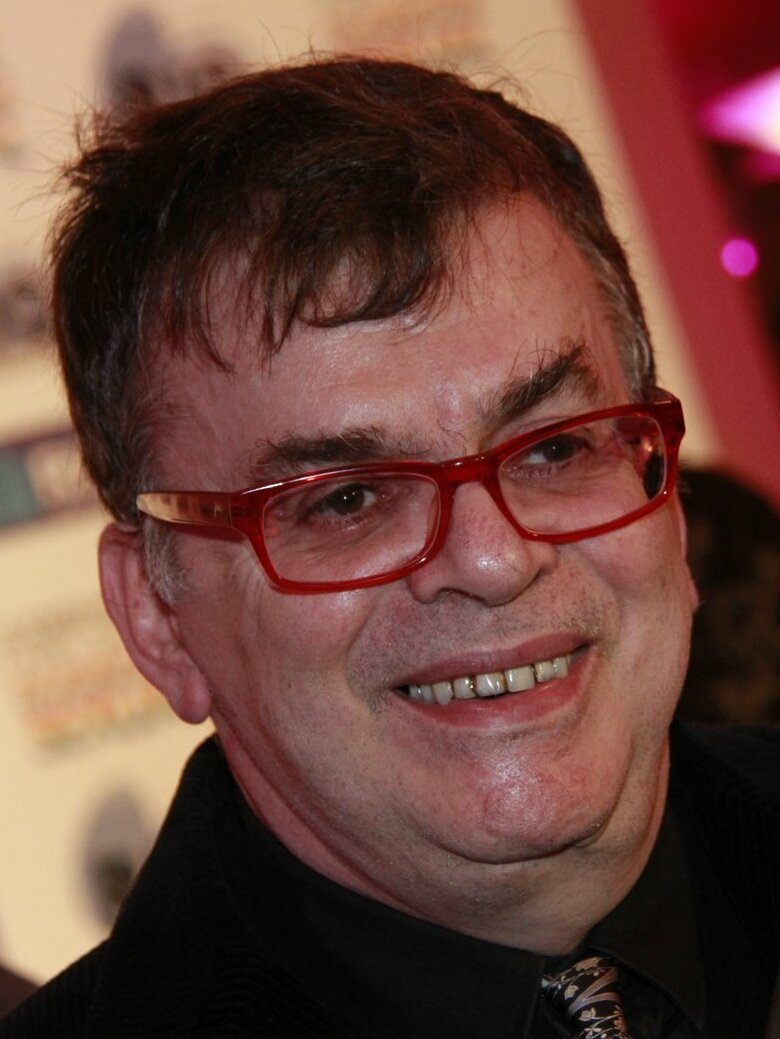
- Born: Walcyr Rodrigues Carrasco; 1 December 1951 (age 74); Bernardino de Campos, SP, Brazil
- Occupations: Writer; Screenwriter; Journalist
- Known for: Chocolate com Pimenta; Alma Gêmea; Verdades Secretas; Êta Mundo Bom! O Outro Lado do Paraíso; A Dona do Pedaço
- Awards: International Emmy Award

Walcyr Rodrigues Carrasco (born 1 December 1951) is a Brazilian author, film writer and television writer.

== Career ==
Walcyr Rodrigues Carrasco was born on 1 December 1951, in Bernardino de Campos, São Paulo. Writer, playwright and screenwriter, began his professional career as a journalist. His first published book was Quando Meu Irmãozinho Nasceu. Since then, still in children's literature, he wrote and published several works, among them A Menina que Queria Ser Anjo, Cadê o Super-herói?, Abaixo o Bicho Papão, Quem Quer Sonhar, Meu Encontro com Papai Noel and O Mistério da Gruta. As a playwright, Walcyr Carrasco wrote success stories such as Batom (1995), which revealed the actress Ana Paula Arósio, and Êxtase (1997), for which he received the Shell award for best author.

He made his debut writing for television in the late 1980s, with the telenovela Cortina de Vidro, produced and aired by SBT. Then, in the Rede Manchete, wrote three mini-series: Rosa-dos-Rumos (1990), O Guarani (1991) and Filhos do Sol (1991). Hired by Globo, he worked as a text supervisor on the series Retrato de Mulher (1993), starring actress Regina Duarte.

Walcyr Carrasco was also, along with Mário Teixeira, the author of the telenovela Xica da Silva (1996), produced and also aired by the extinct Manchete TV, under the direction of Walter Avancini. He was required to sign the plot under the alias Adamo Angel at the time because he had been hired by SBT. He wrote Fascinaço (1998) while still a student at SBT.

Carrasco returned to work at Globo in 2000, when he also - with Mário Teixeira - signed his first telenovela on the station, O Cravo e a Rosa (2000). Inspired by the Shakespearean classic The Taming of the Shrew, with references sought in A Indomada, Ivani Ribeiro's novel, screened in 1965 by TV Excelsior, and Sérgio Jockyman's O Machão, aired in 1974 by TV Tupi. O Cravo e a Rosa was a great success at 6:00 pm with Eduardo Moscovis and Adriana Esteves in the roles Julião Petruchio and Catarina Batista. Walter Avancini was the director, with whom Walcyr Carrasco would also work on his next work, the telenovela A Padroeira (2001). Set in the 18th century, A Padroeira debuted three months after O Cravo e a Rosa, and starred Luigi Baricelli and Deborah Secco in the lead roles, the telenovela turned out to be the latest work by director Walter Avancini, who died in July 2001.

Then Walcyr Carrasco was one of the authors of the second version of the series Sítio do Picapau Amarelo (2001), based Monteiro Lobato's novel. He returned to write telenovelas in 2002, replacing - from episode 149 - the author Benedito Ruy Barbosa ahead of Esperança (2002).

== Filmography ==
=== Telenovela ===
| Title | Year | Credited as | | | Note |
| Title | Year | Author | Co-author | Supervisor | Note |
|---|---|---|---|---|---|
| Cortina de Vidro | 1989 | Yes | | | |
| Xica da Silva | 1996 | Yes | | | Under the pseudonym Adamo Angel |
| Fascinação | 1998 | Yes | | | |
| O Cravo e a Rosa | 2000 | Yes | | | with Mário Teixeira |
| A Padroeira | 2001 | Yes | | | |
| Esperança | 2002 | | Yes | | with Benedito Ruy Barbosa |
| Chocolate com Pimenta | 2003 | Yes | | | |
| Alma Gêmea | 2005 | Yes | | | |
| O Profeta | 2006 | | | Yes | with Duca Rachid and Thelma Guedes |
| Sete Pecados | 2007 | Yes | | | |
| Caras & Bocas | 2009 | Yes | | | |
| Morde e Assopra | 2011 | Yes | | | |
| Gabriela | 2012 | Yes | | | |
| Amor à Vida | 2013 | Yes | | | |
| Verdades Secretas | 2015–2021 | Yes | | | International Emmy Award for Best Telenovela |
| Êta Mundo Bom! | 2016 | Yes | | | |
| O Outro Lado do Paraíso | 2017 | Yes | | | |
| A Dona do Pedaço | 2019 | Yes | | | |
| Terra e Paixão | 2023 | Yes | | | |

=== Series ===
| Title | Year | Credited as | | Note |
| Title | Year | Author | Collaborator/screenwriter | Note |
|---|---|---|---|---|
| Sítio do Picapau Amarelo | 2002 | | Yes | with Mário Teixeira and Thelma Guedes. |
