= Daniel Boaventura =

Brazilian actor, voice actor and singer

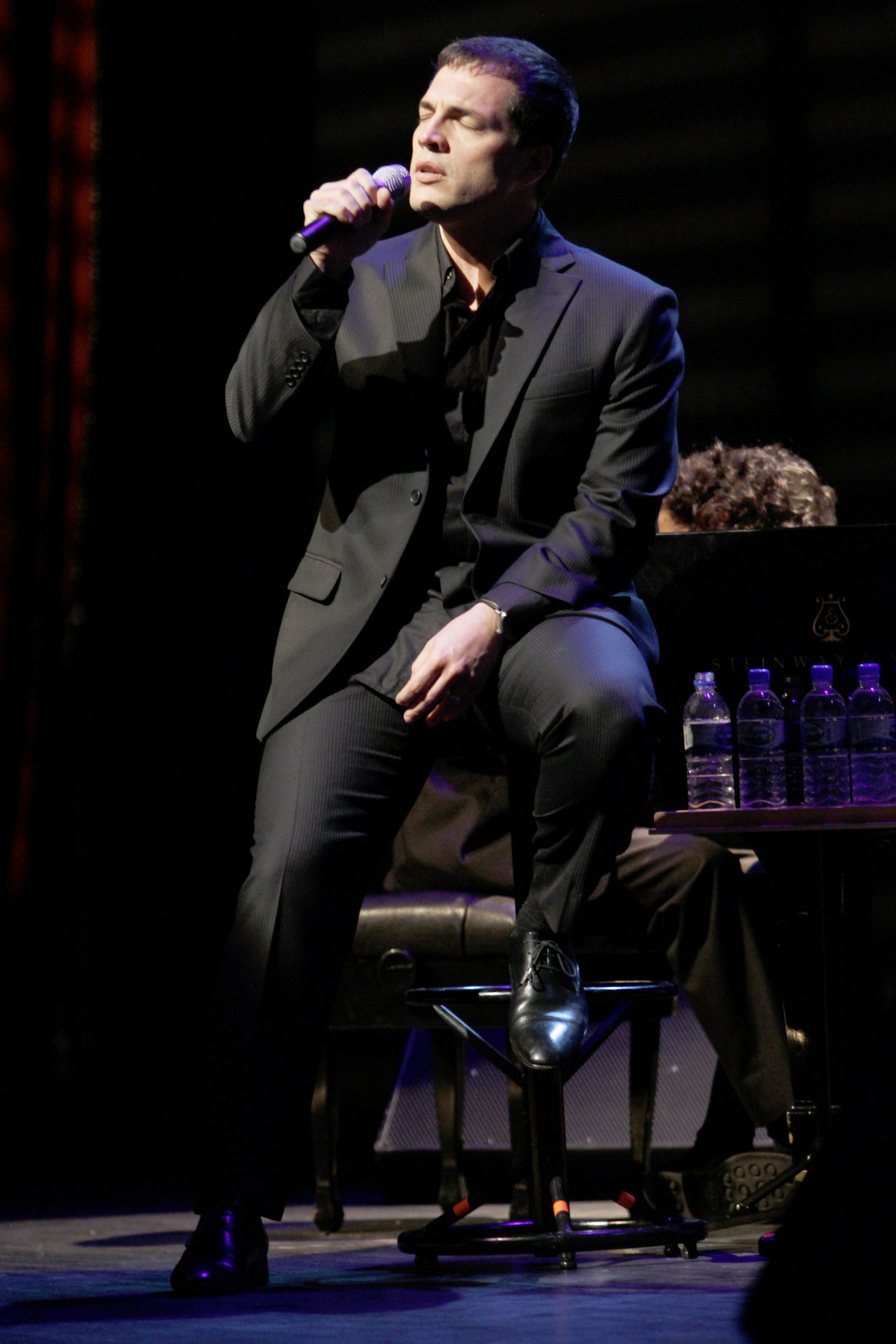
- Boaventura performing at the Jazz Festival Brasil in 2010
- Born: Daniel do Rêgo Boaventura; May 19, 1970 (age 55); Salvador, Bahia, Brazil
- Occupations: Actor (stage, film, voice), singer
- Years active: 1991–present
- Spouse: Juliana Serbeto (1998-2011)
- Children: Joana and Isabela
- Website: danielboaventura.com.br

Daniel Boaventura (May 19, 1970) is a Brazilian actor and singer. Popular worldwide, Boaventura has held the lead roles in the musicals Peter Pan, My Fair Lady, Evita, and Chicago — as well as the role of patriarch, Gomez Addams, in the 2012 musical The Addams Family. Diane Warren wrote the song "Catch My Breath" for Boaventura; he had a recurring role on the Brazilian telenovela Laços de Família.

== Background ==
Born Daniel do Rêgo Boaventura on May 19, 1970 in Salvador, Brazil to two teachers, Boaventura grew up listening to Brazilian popular music (MPB) and classical music, and his early schooling included music training. When he was 15, he purchased a Dire Straits live album, which made a tremendous impact on his music sensibilities. With schoolmates, he formed two bands, Horas Vagas (Spare Time) and Os Tocáveis (The Touchables), while also completing courses in administration, public relations and advertising. The musical efforts remained informal until his band Horas Vagas was invited to participate in the musical Cinema Cantado.

In 1991, Fernando Guerreiro, creator of Cia. Baiana de Patifaria, noticed Boaventura on his stage debut, singing classic Broadway vocals. Guerreiro invited Boaventura to the musical Zás Trás. He subsequently performed a solo show called "Pop n' Jazz," for which he won the Caymmi Trophy in the covers category and soon after took part in a production of Bertold Brecht's O Casamento do Pequeno Bourgeois (A Respectable Wedding) where he sang, acted and played saxophone.

== Personal life ==
Boaventura was married to Juliana Serbeto from 1998 to 2011; they had two daughters Joana (2003) and Isabela (2009).

== Career ==
=== Filmography ===
Television
Year	Title	Role
1998	Hilda Furacão	Zico
1999	O Santo de Casa	Kiko
2000–2001	Laços de Família	Alex
2001–2002	Amor e Ódio	José Maria Cortês
2003–2004	Kubanacan	Johnny
2004	Linha Direta	Rui Dourado
2004	A Grande Família	Otávio
2004	Senhora do Destino	TV Interviewer
2005	Essas Mulheres	Ferreira Pinto
2006–2009	Malhação	Adriano Lopes
2006	Papai Noel Existe	Roberto
2007	Dicas de um Sedutor	Rick (Ricardo)
2009	Toma Lá, Dá Cá	Álvaro
2009	A Grande Família	Aníbal
2009–2010	Cama de Gato	Sólon
2010–2011	Passione	Diogo Dias
2011; 2013	Tapas & Beijos	Paulo César (PC)
2012	Dercy de Verdade	Dr. Simão
2012	As Brasileiras	Jorge
2012	A Grande Família	Capitain Wilson
2012–2013	Guerra dos Sexos	Nenê Stallone
2013	Dança dos Famosos 10	Himself
2019	Éramos Seis	Adoniran

Film
Year	Title	Role
2001	3 Histórias da Bahia	O Pai do Rock Teatro
2005	Coisa de Mulher	Dr. Isaac Bucemberg
2013	Odeio o Dia dos Namorados	Heitor
2013	Epic	Ronin (voice)
2013	Worms	Bigwig (voice)
2019	Hebe: A Estrela do Brasil	Silvio Santos
2019	Klaus	Klaus (voice)

Theatre
Year	Title	Role
1991	Cinema Cantado	Singer
1992	Zás Trás	Capitain
1992	O Casamento do Burguês	Groom's Friend
1993	Pop 'N' Jazz	
1994	Cafajestes	Alencar
2000	Company	Harry
2001	Victor/Victoria	King Marchand
2002	O Grande Dia	
2002	Beauty and the Beast	Gaston
2004	Chicago	Billy Flynn
2005	Camila Baker	Camila Baker
2006	My Fair Lady	Prof. Henry Higgins
2011	Evita	Juan Perón
2012	The Addams Family	Gomez Addams

Discography
Year	Title	Format	Label	Country
2009	Songs 4 U	CD, Album	Som Livre	Brazil
2009	Songs 4 U	CD, Album, RE	Sony Music	Brazil
2010	Italiano	CD, Album	Sony Music	Brazil
2012	Ao Vivo	Twin CD, Album	Sony Music	Brazil
2014	One More Kiss	CD, Album	Sony Music	Brazil
2015	Your Song - Ao Vivo	CD, Album	Sony Music	Brazil
2015	Your Song (En Vivo)	Twin CD, Album + DVD-V	Sony Music	Mexico
2015	Your Song - Ao Vivo	Twin CD, Album	Sony Music	Brazil
2018	Ao Vivo No Mexico	CD, Album + DVD-V	Sony Music	Mexico
2018	Ao Vivo No Mexico	DVD-V+CD, Album	Sony Music	Brazil
2019	From Russia With Love (En Vivo En Moscu)	CD, Album, DVD, DVD-Video	Sony Music	Mexico
