= Elizabeth Savalla =

Brazilian actress (born 1949)

Elizabeth Savala
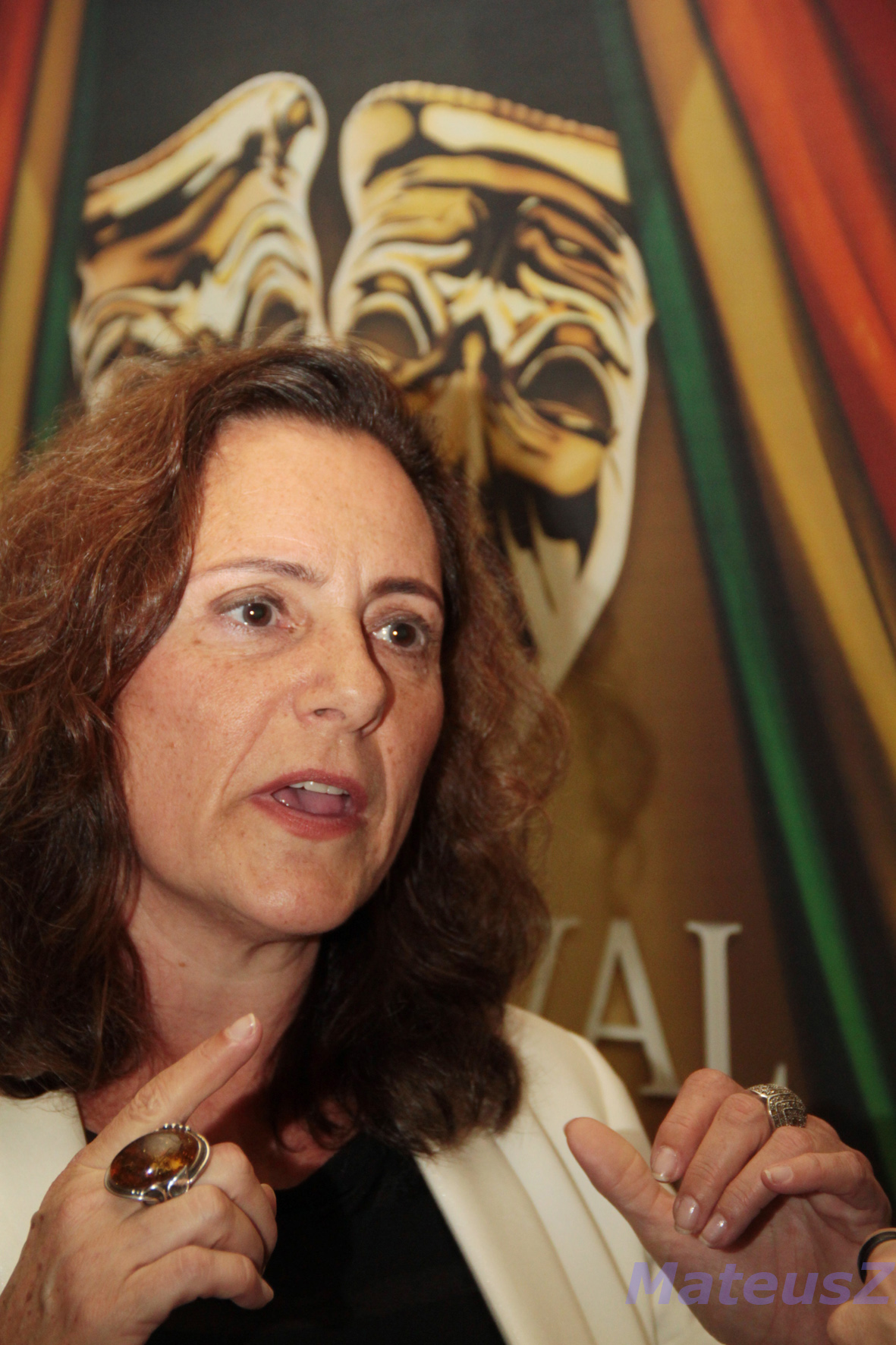
- Savalla at Teatro Pedro II in 2010
- Born: Elizabeth Savala Casquel; 23 November 1954 (age 71); São Paulo, Brazil
- Education: University of São Paulo
- Occupation: Actress
- Years active: 1974–present
- Spouses: Marcelo Picchi (m. 1970; div. 1986) Camilo Átilla (m. 2011)
- Children: 4

Elizabeth Savala Casquel (born 23 November 1954) is a Brazilian actress and businesswoman.

== Biography ==
Elizabeth is of Spanish descent by paternal and maternal side. She was studying at Eduardo Prado High School when actress Lourdes de Moraes referred her to the School of Dramatic Arts in São Paulo. At 19 years of age, she married actor Marcelo Picchi and their marriage lasted 11 years. They have four children together: Thiago Picchi, Diogo, and the twins Ciro and Tadeu, who are also actors. In 1978, she was elected by the Brazilian variety TV programme Fantástico, one of the ten most beautiful women in the country, despite being known for not caring about her looks. She has been married since 1986 to theatrical architect and producer Camilo Attila.
