= Era uma Vez... =

Brazilian television series

Era Uma Vez… (English title: Once Upon a Time) is a Brazilian telenovela produced by Estúdios Globo and aired by Globo from March 30 to October 2, 1998, in 161 chapters, replacing Anjo Mau and being replaced by Pecado Capital. It is written by Walther Negrão and directed by Jorge Fernando.

== Cast ==
Actor	Character
Drica Moraes	Madalena
Herson Capri	Álvaro Giunquetti
Andréa Beltrão	Bruna Reis
Luíza Curvo	Maria da Glória Kleiner Giunquetti (Glorinha)
Cláudio Marzo	Xistus Kleiner
Elias Gleizer	Giuseppe Giunquetti (Pepe)
Suzy Rêgo	Heloísa
Tuca Andrada	Danilo Borges
Nair Bello	Santa Zanella
Antônio Calloni	Manuel Dionísio (Maneco)
Nívea Stelmann	Bárbara (Babi)
Cláudio Heinrich	Fernando Reis (Filé)
Deborah Secco	Emília Zanella
Yoná Magalhães	Anita Reis
Jorge Dória	Rodolfo Reis (Rudy)
Tereza Rachel	Dona Berta / Mary Poppins
Ângela Figueiredo	Débora Kleiner
Myrian Rios	Isaura
André Gonçalves	Júlio
Marcos Frota	Horácio Zanella
Alexandre Lemos	José Maria Kleiner Giunquetti (Zé Maria)
Alessandra Aguiar	Maria José Kleiner Giunquetti (Marizé)
Pedro Agum	Lafayete Kleiner Giunquetti (Fafá)
Diogo Vilela	Frei Chicão
Stella Freitas	Quitéria
Emiliano Queiroz	Catulo
Cinira Camargo	Laura
João Carlos Barroso	Jorge José (J.J.)
Léa Camargo	Yara
Hilda Rebello	Olga
Luciano Vianna	Tito
Sura Berditchevsky	Letícia
José Augusto Branco	Yves Tapajós
Rejane Goulart	Nilda
Paco Sanches	Paquito
Patrícia Lucchesi	Eulália
Luiz Carlos Tourinho	Banshee
Marcelo Barros	Mariano (Nino)
Raquel Nunes	Cindy
Maria Carol Rebello	Iracema (Cema)
Eduardo Caldas	Sarrafo
Rosana Oliveira	Edith Tapajós
Luã Ubacker	Doca
