= Tássia Camargo =

Brazilian actress

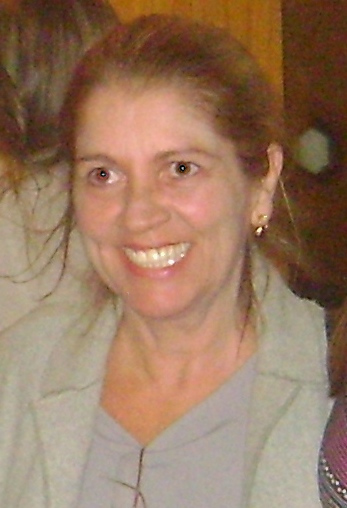
- Camargo in 2012
- Born: Maria Aparecida Pereira Anastasio; 29 January 1961 (age 65); Guarulhos, São Paulo, Brazil
- Occupations: Actress; TV host
- Years active: 1981–present
- Political party: PT (2017–present)
- Spouses: Dennis Carvalho (m. 1983; div. 1985) Marinho Boffa (m. 1985; div. 1996)

Maria Aparecida Pereira Anastasio (born 29 January 1961) is a Brazilian actress and TV host.

== Biography ==
Tássia Camargo has participated in several films, plays, serials, and telenovelas. When Camargo was 17, her career began in the theater under the tutelage of director Antunes Filho in 1978. In 2016, with the spectacle of Eugène Ionesco, she joined the stage with Edi Botelho under the direction of Ney Latorraca.

Camargo's first television role was in a telenovela from Rede Bandeirantes, where she appeared in Os Adolescentes. The actress was the first presenter of the Vídeo Show in its first year in 1983.

She has also portrayed the characters Marlene from O Salvador da Pátria, Elisa from Tieta, and Marina da Glória from Escolinha do Professor Raimundo.

In 2006, Camargo played Lucília in the telenovela Vidas Opostas in Rede Record, which won the Troféu Imprensa. However, the actress was dismissed from the station soon after, due to behavioral problems on the set of recording. She was allegedly aggressive with the production team and fought with renowned actress Jussara Freire.

== Personal life ==
Camargo is the mother of two boys. She was married for 11 years to musician Marinho Boffa. The marriage ended in 1996, shortly after the death of her two-year-old daughter, a victim of late congenital rubella. She started a campaign against the incorrect prognosis of the said sickness which took the life of her daughter.

== Filmography ==
=== Television ===
Year	Title	Role	Notes
1981	Os Adolescentes	Majô	
1982	Chico Anysio Show	Marina da Glória	
1982	Elas por Elas	Míriam Ferraz (Myrian)	
1983	Vídeo Show	Presenter	
1983	Pão Pão, Beijo Beijo	Nina	
1984	Rabo de Saia	Nice (Nicinha)	
1985	Um Sonho a Mais	Mônica Aranha	
1986	Selva de Pedra	Joana / Jane	
1988	Chapadão do Bugre	Rita de Assis (Ritinha)	
1988	Chico Anysio Show	Marina da Glória	
1989	O Salvador da Pátria	Marlene Machado da Silva	
1989	Tieta	Elisa Esteves D'Alemberti	
1990	Delegacia de Mulheres	Margô	Episode: "Formicida e Guaraná"
1990	Escolinha do Professor Raimundo	Marina da Glória	
1991	Estados Anysios de Chico City	Various characters	
1991	O Dono do Mundo	Teresa de Jesus (Teresinha)	
1992	As Noivas de Copacabana	Marilene Batista	
1992	Despedida de Solteiro	Madalena Chaddad Santarém (Lenita)	
1993	Você Decide		Episode: "Se Acaso Você Chegasse"
1994	Você Decide	Amanda	Episode: "O Último Desejo"
1994	Quatro por Quatro	Maria Bataglia	
1995	Você Decide		Episode: "O Sacrifício"
1996	Você Decide		Episode: "No Silêncio da Noite"
1996	Anjo de Mim	Antônia	
1998	Você Decide		Episode: "Amor ao Próximo"
1998	Dona Flor e Seus Dois Maridos	Madona	
1999	Meu Bem Querer	Marta	Special participation
2000	O Cravo e a Rosa	Joana Penaforte Batista	
2001	A Padroeira	Generosa	Special participation
2002	Brava Gente	Gleice	Episode: "A Hora Errada"
2003	Jamais Te Esquecerei	Isabela	Episode: "April 14, 2003"
2004	Malhação	Lúcia da Silva Gomes	Seasons 11–13 (2004–2006)
2006	Vidas Opostas	Lucília de Souza	
2015	Tudo pela Audiência	Marina da Glória	Episode: "April 15, 2015"
2018	Valor da Vida	Elisa	Season 2

=== Films ===
Year	Title	Role
1982	Amor de Perversão	Tereza
1983	Corpo e Alma de Uma Mulher	Aimé
1984	O Filho Adotivo	Carolina
1988	Banana Split	
