= Vivianne Pasmanter =

Brazilian actress

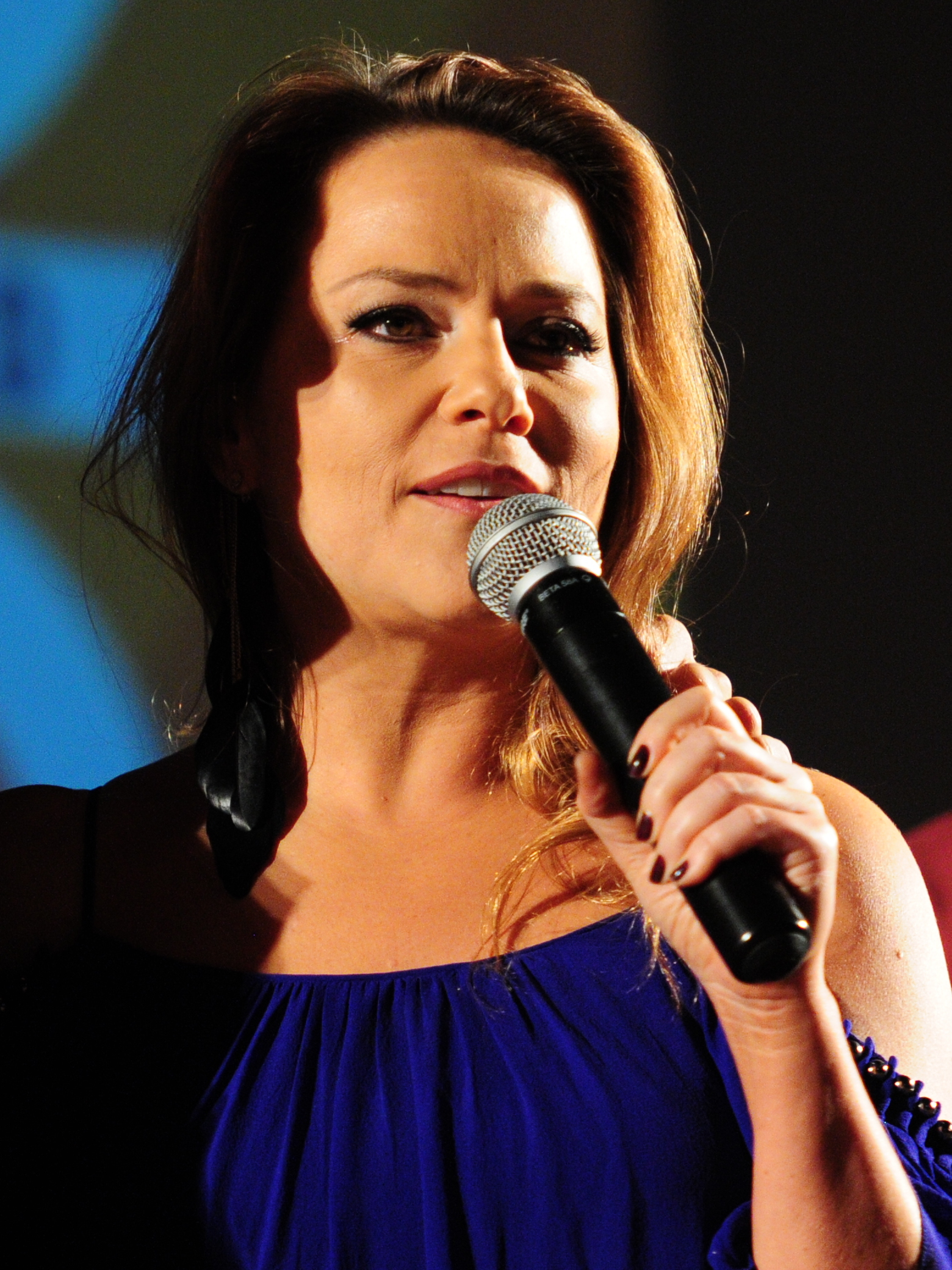
- Pasmanter in 2016
- Born: 24 May 1971 (age 54); São Paulo, Brazil
- Occupation: Actress
- Years active: 1990–present
- Height: 1.60 m (5 ft 3 in)
- Spouse: Gilberto Zaborowsky (m. 2001; div. 2008)
- Children: 2

Vivianne Pasmanter (born 24 May 1971) is a Brazilian actress.

== Biography ==
Of Jewish origin, Vivianne is the daughter of Ricardo Pasmanter, civil engineer, and Berta Pasmanter, plastic artist (both natural of Argentina). Her first course was in Escola Hebraica de Teatro, where she met Caco Ciocler, who would later play opposite professionally. Within its formation are the Escola de Arte Dramática, courses with Antunes Filho and Miriam Mehler, among others.

== Career ==
She began her career doing commercials, like the jeans Staroup. One of her first jobs was as an actress in a cameo role as a fairy in one of the episodes of the painting "Senta que lá vem história...", the program Rá-Tim-Bum TV Cultura in 1990. But her first big career opportunity that occurred in 1991 when she moved to the city of Rio de Janeiro in order to play in her first novel, the villain Débora in the novel Felicidade, written by Manoel Carlos. Still with the same author would another villain weight, Laura of Por Amor.

In her career collecting roles in soap operas especially, as Malu of Mulheres de Areia, the Irene of A Próxima Vítima, the Lavínia of Anjo de Mim, the Elisabete of Andando nas Nuvens and Maria João of Uga-Uga. After six years of sporadic participation, returned to the screen in Páginas da Vida, as the photographer Isabel. Later played Regeane Cordeiro, one of the protagonists of the novel Tempos Modernos.

Her career is not only limited to television, theater and film is also, like the play Tartufo and movie Quase um Tango..., which won her the award Kikito for best actress in Festival de Gramado.

On her 25-year career in 2016, Vivianne took stock: "I had the opportunity to make very different, unique and striking characters. This diversity challenged me and stimulated me as an actress, but also brought a lot of personal learning. by a character". In 2017, living the priceless Germana in Novo Mundo, debut novel by Alessandro Marson and Thereza Falcão, whose transformation into an ugly woman left the actress unrecognizable. Her performance is so praised and so successful that the character eventually steals the scene, and together with Ingrid Guimarães and Letícia Colin were considered the great feminine highlights of the novel.

== Personal life ==
She married entrepreneur Gilberto Zaborowsky in 2001, with whom she has a son, Eduardo, and a daughter, Lara. They divorced in 2008.

== Filmography ==
=== TV ===
Television
Year	Title	Role	Notes
1990	Rá-Tim-Bum	Fairy Godmother	Episode: "Cinderela"
1991	Felicidade	Débora Meirelles	
1993	Mulheres de Areia	Malu Assunção	
1994	Educação Para o Trânsito	Herself	
1994	Você Decide	Carolina	Episode: "Passarinhos e Gaviões"
1994	Você Decide		Episode: "Amor e Morte"
1995	A Próxima Vítima	Irene Ribeiro	
1996	Alén, Luz de Luna	Vera Hardoy	Argentinian telenovela
1996	Anjo de Mim	Lavínia / Valentina	
1997	Por Amor	Laura Saboya Trajano	
1998	Você Decide		Episode: "Sexo Falado é Sexo?"
1999	O Belo e as Feras		Episode: "Mulher de Amigo Meu pra Mim é Ótimo!"
1999	Andando nas Nuvens	Elisabete Montana Rocha	
2000	Uga-Uga	Maria João Portella	
2003	Kubanacan	Lorena Velásquez	Episodes: "December 29, 2003–January 23, 2004"
2006	Páginas da Vida	Isabel Fernandes	
2008	Você Está Aqui	Fabiana	Episode: "15 Minutos"
2008	Você Está Aqui	Beth	Episode: "Agora Você Tem Duas Opções"
2008	Casos e Acasos	Suzana	Episode: "O Colchão, a Mala e a Balada"
2008	Guerra & Paz	Dra. Silvia	Episode: "Maniacos & Depressivos"
2009	Tudo Novo de Novo	Karen Vilela	
2010	Tempos Modernos	Regeane Cordeiro	
2012	As Brasileiras	Maria Eduarda Stein	Episode: "A Venenosa de Sampa"
2014	Em Família	Shirley Soares Esteves	
2015	As Canalhas	Lilian	Episode: "Lilian"
2015	Totalmente Demais	Liliane de Bocaiuva Monteiro (Lili)	
2017	Dois Irmãos	Sister Damasceno	Phase 1
2017	Novo Mundo	Germana Ferreira	
2021	Nos Tempos do Imperador	Germana Ferreira	Phase 1

=== Cinema ===
Film
Year	Title	Role	Notes
1991	Estação Aurora	Clara	Short film
1998	Contos de Lygia e Morte	Vânia	
2000	Deus Jr.		
2003	Viva Voz	Mari	
2009	Se eu Fosse Você 2	Carla Bond	
2009	Vento	Imaculada	Short film
2009	Meninos de Kichute	Ms. Maria	
2009	Quase um Tango	Marialva / Roseli / Letícia / Calendar Girl	
2010	Rosa Morena	Tereza	
2012	Tanta	Lygia	
2012	Totalmente Inocentes	Delegate Carina	
2014	Jogo da Memória		
2015	Linda de Morrer	Jô	
2016	Malícia	Clara Leão	

=== Theater ===
Parts
Year	Title	Role
1994	Para Tão Longo Amor	Raquel
1995	Alô Madame	
2003	Tartuffe	
2008	Dois Irmãos	Domingas
2009	Um Dia Quase Igual aos Outros	
2009	Dois por um Bordeaux	
2012	Vestido de Noiva	Madame Clessi
