= Uga-Uga =

- Genre: Telenovela
- Created by: Carlos Lombardi
- Written by: Margareth Boury; Tiago Santiago
- Directed by: Wolf Maya
- Starring: Humberto Martins; Vivianne Pasmanter; Lima Duarte; Marcello Novaes; Nair Bello; Vera Holtz; Danielle Winits; Mariana Ximenes; Marcos Pasquim; Tato Gabus Mendes; Nívea Stelmann; Betty Lago; Heitor Martinez
- Opening theme: "Kotahitanga" by Hinewehi Mohi
- Country of origin: Brazil
- Original language: Portuguese
- No. of episodes: 221

Production
- Running time: 50 minutes

Original release
- Network: Rede Globo
- Release: 8 May 2000 – 19 January 2001

Uga-Uga is a Brazilian telenovela produced and aired by Rede Globo from 8 May 2000 to 19 January 2001 for 221 episodes. It is written by Carlos Lombardi, with the collaboration of Margareth Boury and Tiago Santiago.

== Cast ==
- Humberto Martins as Bernardo Baldochi / Bento (Kala Kalú)
- Vivianne Pasmanter as Maria João Portela
- Cláudio Heinrich as Adriano Karabastos (Tatu)
- Vera Holtz as Santa Karabastos
- Lima Duarte as Nikos Karabastos
- Danielle Winits as Tati (Tatiana Prado)
- Marcello Novaes as Beterraba
- Mariana Ximenes as Bionda Arruda Prado
- Marcos Pasquim as Casemiro Baldochi (Van Damme)
- Lúcia Veríssimo as Maria Louca
- Sílvia Pfeifer as Vitória Arruda Prado
- Heitor Martinez as Rolando Karabastos
- Tato Gabus Mendes as Anísio Karabastos
- Wolf Maya as Felipe Prado
- Nair Bello as Pierina Baldochi
- Marcos Frota as Nikolaos Karabastos Júnior (Nikos)
- Ângelo Paes Leme as Salomão
- Françoise Forton as Larissa Guerra
- Oswaldo Loureiro as Querubim
- Roberto Bonfim as Pajé
- Nívea Stelmann as Gui (Guinivere)
- Rita Guedes as Stella
- Joana Limaverde as Bruna
- Matheus Rocha as Ari
- Juliana Baroni as Shiva Maria Pomeranz
- Geórgia Gomide as Gherda
- Luiz Guilherme as Turco
- Alexandre Lemos as Dinho
- Delano Avelar as Argel
- Vanessa Nunes as Penélope
- Alexandre Schumacher as Zen
- Vick Militello as Dominatrix
- Tatyane Goulart as Lilith Pomeranz
- Beth Lamas as Madá
- Hugo Gross as Barbosa
- Mônica Mattos as Tânia

=== Guest stars ===
- Betty Lago as Brigitte / Alice
- Lúcia Veríssimo as Maria Louca
- Mário Gomes as Ladislau Pomeranz
- John Herbert as Veludo
- Stepan Nercessian as João Guerra Portella
- Jorge Pontual as Mutuca
- Marcelo Faria as Ramon
- Maria Ceiça as Rosa
- Denise Fraga as Mag
- Luiz Fernando Guimarães as Varella
- João Carlos Barroso as Pereirinha
- Luciano Szafir as Pepê
- Edwin Luisi as Francis
- Cássia Linhares as Lulú
- Nelson Freitas as Nilo
- Clarice Niskier as Amélia
- Bianca Castanho as Ametista
- Silvia Nobre as Crocoká
- Taís Araújo as Emilinha
- Cláudia Lira as Suzi
- Norma Geraldy as Norma
- Oswaldo Louzada as Dr Moretti
- Lolita Rodrigues as Carmen
- Gabriel Braga Nunes as Otacílio
- Paula Burlamaqui as Kate
- Elias Gleizer as Ceguinho
- Isadora Ribeiro as Marlene
- Ewerton de Castro as Marido nervoso
- Daniele Suzuki as Sarah
- Marcos Breda as Gumercindo
- Betty Erthal as Violeta
- Sokram Sommar as Índio Tupã
- Sérgio Loroza as Pimpão
- George Bezerra as Zeca
- Osvaldo Mil as Geraldão
- João Camargo as Padre Zeca
- Moacir Alves as Antiquário
- Fernanda Lobo as Gorda na lanchonete
- Alexandre Zacchia as Jambo
- Berta Loran as Varella's passenger on the plane
- Miriam Pires as Cecília
- Marcela Rafea as Dóris
- Junior Prata as Pescador
