= Nívea Stelmann =

Brazilian actress and television presenter (born 1974)

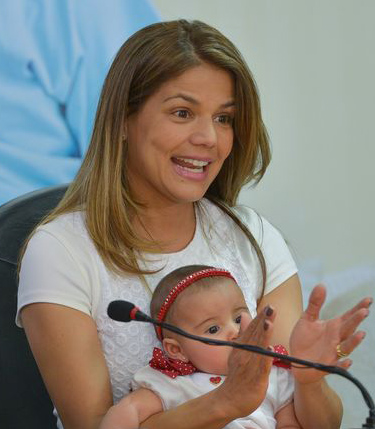
- Stelmann with her daughter Bruna in 2014
- Born: Nívea Stelmann Leôncio; 6 April 1974 (age 52); Paraíba do Sul, Rio de Janeiro, Brazil
- Occupations: Actress; television presenter
- Years active: 1993–present
- Spouses: Mário Frias (m. 2003; div. 2005) Eduardo Azer (m. 2007; div. 2008) Marcus Rocha (m. 2013)
- Children: 2
- Website: www.niveastelmann.com.br

Nívea Stelmann Leôncio (born 6 April 1974) is a Brazilian actress and television presenter.

== Biography ==
She was born and raised in the city of Paraíba do Sul, Rio de Janeiro, in the State of Rio de Janeiro. Born to entrepreneur parents, she decided at 12 years old that she wanted to become famous.

From an early age, she tried to convince her parents to allow her to go live on her own in the city of Rio de Janeiro At 16 years old, Nivea got permission to move to Rio, where she attended college, pursuing a major in journalism, which she studied for three semesters but never graduated.

During her college studies, Nivea was also a model for Ford Models and did television commercials.

Later on, Nívea started attending Performing Arts classes at the UNI-Rio.

== Career ==
Shortly afterwards, Nivea passed a test to perform on the show Família Brasil, of defunct TV Manchete. In this work, her love interest was Danton Mello.

With the end of Família Brasil, TV Manchete, she returned to her classes at UNI-Rio.

Eventually, Nivea won the test for a part in the segment "Estrela por um Dia" on the TV show Domingão do Faustão. She won the contest and one month later, she was invited to perform in the novella Malhação in 1996. Wolf Maya, who was the director, gave her the role of Luana, a tennis teacher.

After her participation in Malhação ended, Nivea got the role of Carolaine in the novella A Indomada, written by Aguinaldo Silva. That role made Nívea Stelmann popular in her home country.

Later on, Nivea also participated in the novellas Era Uma Vez..., Suave Veneno, Uga-Uga, O Clone, Chocolate com Pimenta and Alma Gêmea, all from Rede Globo.

In 2002 Nivea starred the play Give Love a Chance, alongside Mário Frias, her husband at that time. The play was written by Heloise Périssé and directed by João Brandão.

In 2007, Nivea took part in the novella Sete Pecados. In October of that same year, she was chosen the queen of the rhythmists of the school of samba Renascer, a position she occupied for the next two years.

In 2008, she was part of the cast of the TV series Casos e Acasos on the episode Dicas de um Sedutor. Also in 2008, she did the children's play Cyrano, an adaptation by director Karen Acioly, inspired on the play Cyrano de Bergerac by Edmond Rostand.

In 2009, she participated in the novella Cama de Gato, from Rede Globo.

Between 2009 and 2010, the actress starred in the theatres the musical play Um Lugar Chamado Recanto.

In 2011, Nivea participated in the novella Morde & Assopra, from Rede Globo, as Lavinia, a former prostitute.

In 2013, she returned to the theatres with the play Batalha de Arroz num Ringue para Dois, alongside actor Maurício Machado. In that same year, Nívea published her first book, Dedo Podre.

In 2016 returns to the TV, this time in Rede Record, where it acted in the biblical novels Os Dez Mandamentos and A Terra Prometida. In 2017, she begins to present the Nívea Stelmann na América, on the CBTV channel. The program talks about the best of entertainment and the world of Brazilian celebrities in the United States.

== Personal life ==
She started dating the singer and actor Mário Frias in 1998. They moved in together in 2001 and got married in 2003, in the city of Rio de Janeiro. On the night of 11 September 2004, their son, Miguel, was born. In November 2005 the couple announced their divorce.

In July 2007 she married the TV executive Eduardo Azer, a former boyfriend from her teenage years. Their marriage ended in divorced in October 2008.

In March 2011 she started dating footballer Elano, but they broke up a few months later. The couple became involved in a major controversy: Nívea, dissatisfied with the end of the relationship, threatened to publish intimate photos of the player and even sent copies of those images to Santos FC, where he played. Elano appealed to the court and the judge granted an advance of guardianship, with a fine expected if the images were published.

On 17 July 2013, Nivea married businessman Marcus Rocha. In August 2013, she announced through her Twitter account that she was pregnant with her second child. On 23 March 2014, Nívea gave birth to Bruna, her first child with husband Marcus, in Rio de Janeiro.

In August 2014 she was the patron of the campaign to encourage breastfeeding launched by the Ministry of Health.

== Filmography ==
=== Television ===
Year	Title	Role	Note
1993	Família Brasil	Tatiana Brasil (Tati)	
1995	Cara & Coroa	Cátia	Episodes: "September 19–20, 1995"
1995	História de Amor	Store clerk	Episode: "October 9, 1995"
1996	Malhação de Verão	Luana Vergueiro	Spin-off
1996	Anjo de Mim	Maralanis	Episodes: "November 10–17, 1996"
1997	A Indomada	Carolaine Mackenzie Pitiguary	
1997	Malhação	Mônica	Season 3; Episode: "December 21, 1997"
1998	Era Uma Vez...	Bárbara Nunes (Babi)	
1999	Suave Veneno	Eliete Viegas	
2000	Uga-Uga	Guinevere Anísio (Gui)	
2001	A Grande Família	Rose	Episode: "Consciência Limpa é Melhor Que Dinheiro"
2001	Brava Gente	Jacira	Episode: "As Aventuras de Chico Norato"
2002	O Clone	Ranya Rachid	
2003	Brava Gente	Torlande	Episode: "O Dia do Amor"
2003	Kubanacan		Participation
2003	Chocolate com Pimenta	Maria da Graça Costa Andrade (Graça)	
2005	Alma Gêmea	Alexandra Montenegro	
2006	A Diarista	Laudicéia	Episode: "Aquele do Filme Adulto"
2007	Sete Pecados	Elvira de Souza Florentino (Vivi)	
2008	Dicas de um Sedutor	Janaína	Episode: "Amor e Fantasia"
2008	Casos e Acasos	Cíntia	Episode: "O Diagnóstico, o Fetiche e a Bebida"
2008	Três Irmãs	Karen	Episode: "17 September 2008"
2008	Vídeo Show	Reporter	
2009	Cama de Gato	Kátia Santana Costa	
2011	Morde & Assopra	Lavínia Silva Guedes	
2016	Os Dez Mandamentos	Noemi	Episodes: "2–4 July 2016"
2016	A Terra Prometida	Noemi	

=== Film ===
Year	Title	Role	Notes
2004	Mater Dei	Anne	Short film
2006	A Última Onda	Ana	
2008	Casamento Brasileiro	Rosa	
2014	Mais Uma História	Olívia	Short film

=== Internet ===
Year	Title	Role
2017–present	Nívea Stelmann na América	Presenter

== Theatre ==
Year	Title	Role
1995	Banana Split	Sandy
2000	Comunhão de Bens	Nicinha
2002	Dê uma Chance ao Amor	Teteca
2007	Êxtase	Sônia
2008	Cyrano	Roxane
2009	Um Lugar Chamado Recanto	Zizinha
2013	Batalha de Arroz num Ringue para Dois	Ângela
2017	Dedo Podre	Various roles
