= Anjo de Mim =

- Genre: Telenovela
- Created by: Walther Negrão
- Directed by: Ricardo Waddington
- Starring: Tony Ramos; Helena Ranaldi; Vivianne Pasmanter; Herson Capri; Paloma Duarte; Carolina Kasting; Elias Gleizer; Tássia Camargo; Milton Gonçalves; Françoise Forton; Cláudia Alencar; Otávio Augusto; Íris Bustamante; Márcio Garcia; Eduardo Moscovis
- Opening theme: "Anjo de Mim"
- Composers: Simone and Sérgio Mendes
- Country of origin: Brazil
- Original language: Portuguese
- No. of episodes: 173

Production
- Running time: 50 minutes

Original release
- Network: TV Globo
- Release: 9 September 1996 – 28 March 1997

Anjo de Mim (Angel of Mine) is a Brazilian telenovela produced and broadcast by TV Globo, 9 September 1996 to 28 March 1997 in 173 episodes. Replacing Quem É Você? and being replaced by O Amor Está no Ar, it was the 50th "novela das seis" (seven o'clock novela) aired by the network.

The protagonist, Floriano, dreams of a past life, in which his tragic love with Valentina ends with her vowing to meet him again upon their reincarnation. His search for her is not straightforward as her appearance has changed.

The telenovela was written by Walther Negrão, with the collaboration of Elizabeth Jhin, Ângela Carneiro and Vinícius Vianna, and was directed by Ary Coslov, Roberto Naar, Edson Spinello and Alexandre Avancini and general direction and nucleus of Ricardo Waddington.

The cast featured Tony Ramos, Helena Ranaldi, Herson Capri, Vivianne Pasmanter, Elias Gleizer, Paloma Duarte, Márcio Garcia, Françoise Forton, Milton Gonçalves, Cláudia Alencar, Otávio Augusto, Tássia Camargo and Carolina Kasting in the main roles.

== Synopsis ==
Floriano Ferraz is tormented by severe shoulder pain and visions of a past life, in which a woman dies at his feet. Through hypnotic regression, he discovers that in 1880, he was Belmiro Castanho, a soldier wounded in the shoulder in combat, in love with the beautiful Valentina, protagonists of an impossible and tragic love who, before dying, promise to meet again in a future life to fulfill their love together.

One hundred years later, Floriano is a skeptical sculptor, married to Antônia. Upon learning about his past, he decides to go to a meeting with his former love. In Petrópolis, he finds an abandoned mansion, which will help him decipher the mystery. In his eagerness to recognize Valentina in her current incarnation, Floriano becomes involved with three beautiful women – Lavínia, Maria Elvira and Joana – in the conviction that one of them could be his immortal beloved, since they all have ties to other lives in common.

The humble, rude and courageous Lavínia is friends with the forgetful Canequinha and hides a needy heart from the world. Maria Elvira is a rich, spoiled and romantic young woman who dreams of finding a great love. And Joana suffers in silence with the infidelity of her husband, Bianor, who has been having an affair with Divina for years.

Bianor is a powerful businessman who was betrayed by his friend Marco Monterey, who takes over the company after his sudden disappearance. The ambitious Marco Monterey also becomes Floriano's antagonist in the dispute over the Petrópolis mansion. Marco wants to demolish the building to build a shopping center and cover up a crime. In the end, it is revealed that Marco is the reincarnation of Cincinato, the person responsible for Valentina's death in a past life.

== Cast ==
Actor	Character
Tony Ramos	Floriano Ferraz / Belmiro Castanho
Helena Ranaldi	Joana
Herson Capri	Marco Monterrey
Vivianne Pasmanter	Lavínia / Valentina
Elias Gleizer	Canequinha (Graciliano Gouveia)
Paloma Duarte	Maria Elvira Monterrey (false Valentina)
Carolina Kasting	Valentina
Milton Gonçalves	Mestre Quirino (Sebastião)
Tássia Camargo	Antônia
Françoise Forton	Renata Monterrey
Cláudia Alencar	Divina
Otávio Augusto	Sinésio
Íris Bustamante	Camila
Marcio Garcia	Fernando Monterrey (Nando)
Eduardo Moscovis	Wagner
Mauro Mendonça	José Balbino
Gracindo Júnior	Cincinato
Fabio Sabag	Germinal
Sebastião Vasconcelos	Rutílio
Yoná Magalhães	Ivete
Carlos Gregório	Altino
Ângela Vieira	Zelinda
Renata Dutra	Heloísa
Cláudio Corrêa e Castro	Inácio
Léa Camargo	Agripina
Floriano Peixoto	Geraldo
Maria Helena Dias	Guiomar
Roberto Frota	Crispim
Lina Fróes	Dona Xica
Jonathan Nogueira	Otávio (Tatá)
Renata Lima	Kátia
Edson Silva	Pingo
Alexandre Zacchia	Pedrão
Renata Mafra	Lurdes
Sonia Zagury	Yara
Odilon Wagner	Ulysses
Daniela Escobar	Teresa
Alexandre Lemos	Altino Jr. (Tinim)

=== Support cast ===
Actor	Character
José Wilker	Bianor
Eva Todor	Cotinha
Ana Rosa	Marly
Gilberto Sálvio	Damasceno
Carmem Caroline	Paulina
Jorge Cherques	Palhares
Mauro Porrino	Sandro
Nívea Stelmann	Maralanis
