= Yoná Magalhães =

Brazilian actress

- Magalhães, unknown date
- Born: Yoná Magalhães Gonçalves; 7 August 1935; Rio de Janeiro, Brazil
- Died: 20 October 2015 (aged 80); Rio de Janeiro, Brazil
- Occupation: Actress
- Years active: 1954–2013
- Spouses: Luís Augusto Mendes (m. 1960; sep. 1965) Carlos Alberto (m. 1966; sep. 1971)
- Children: 1

Yoná Magalhães Gonçalves Mendes da Costa (Brazilian Portuguese: [joˈna maɡaˈʎɐ̃js]; 7 August 1935 – 20 October 2015) was a Brazilian actress.

== Filmography ==
=== Television ===
Year	Title	Role	Notes
1955	Ambição		
1955	As Professoras		
1956	Grande Teatro Tupi		Episode: "Um Menino Dentro da Noite"
1956	Grande Teatro Tupi		Episode: "Até Parece Romance"
1957	Grande Teatro Tupi	Cecília	Episode: "Como Nos Amamos"
1957	Grande Teatro Tupi	Margarida	Episode: "A Dama das Camélias"
1957	Grande Teatro Tupi	Perichole	Episode: "A Carroça do St. Sacramento"
1957	Grande Teatro Tupi		Episode: "A Última Conquista de D. Juan"
1957	Além do Céu Azul		
1957	Era Uma Vez... Um Palhaço!		
1957	O Sol Está à Nossa Espera		
1957	O Tempo Tudo Apaga		
1957	Somos Dois		
1958	O Medo e a Arma	Amante	
1958	Primavera	Josefina	
1959	Trágica Mentira		
1966	Eu Compro Esta Mulher	Maria Teresa	
1966	O Sheik de Agadir	Janette Legrand	
1967	A Sombra de Rebeca	Suzuki	
1968	A Gata de Vison	Dolly Parker	
1968	A Gata de Vison	Meggy Parker	
1968	Demian, o Justiceiro	Surama	
1969	A Ponte dos Suspiros	Leonor Dandolo	
1970	Simplesmente Maria	Maria Ramos	
1972	Uma Rosa com Amor	Nara Paranhos de Vasconcelos	
1973	O Semideus	Adriana Penha	
1974	Corrida do Ouro	Walquíria Braga Albuquerque	
1975	Cuca Legal	Fátima	
1975	O Grito	Kátia	
1976	Saramandaia	Zélia Tavares	
1977	Espelho Mágico	Nora Pelegrini / Assunta	
1978	Sinal de Alerta	Talita Bastos	
1979	Gaivotas	Maria Emília	
1980	Cavalo Amarelo	Pepita	
1980	Dulcinéa Vai à Guerra	Pepita	
1981	Os Imigrantes	Mercedez	
1982	Os Imigrantes: Terceira Geração	Mercedita / Pilar Molina	
1983	Maçã do Amor	Lia	
1984	Amor com Amor Se Paga	Maria da Graça (Grace)	
1984	Partido Alto	Drª Miranda Barros	Special participation
1985	Roque Santeiro	Matilde Mendes de Oliveira	
1985	Grande Sertão: Veredas	Maria Mutema	
1987	O Outro	Índia do Brasil	
1988	Vida Nova	Laura "Lalá"	
1989	Tieta	Maria Antônia Esteves "Tonha"	
1990	Meu Bem, Meu Mal	Valentina Venturini	
1992	Despedida de Solteiro	Lola	
1993	Sonho Meu	Magnólia Guerra	
1994	Você Decide	Léa	Episode: "A vida não acabou"
1995	Engraçadinha	Geni	
1995	A Próxima Vítima	Carmela Ferreto Vasconcellos "Cacá"	
1996	A Vida como Ela É...		
1996	A Vida como Ela É...	Srª. Guedes	Episode: "O Monstro"
1996	A Vida como Ela É...	Flávia	Episode: "O Delicado"
1996	A Vida como Ela É...	Glória	Episode: "O Sacrilégio"
1996	A Vida como Ela É...	D. Eduarda	Episode: "Pai Por Dinheiro"
1996	Anjo de Mim	Ivete	
1997	Malhação	Elizabeth	Season 3
1998	Era uma Vez...	Anita Reis	
1999	Vila Madalena	Abigail Ramirez "Bibiana"	
2001	A Padroeira	Úrsula Paz	
2001	As Filhas da Mãe	Violante Ventura	
2002	Zorra Total	Maria I of Portugal	
2003	Agora É que São Elas	Sofia Ramos Zabelheira	
2004	Um Só Coração	Lígia do Amaral	
2004	Senhora do Destino	Flaviana Mendonça	
2005	Carga Pesada	Edna	Episode: "Vem Dançar"
2005	Sob Nova Direção	Daslusa Fragoso	Episode: "October 2nd"
2007	Paraíso Tropical	Virgínia Batista	
2008	Dicas de Um Sedutor	Eliana	Episode: "Amor e Amizade"
2008	Negócio da China	Suzete Noronha	
2009	Cama de Gato	Adalgisa Monteiro de Britto	
2009	Tudo Novo de Novo	Esther	Episode: "Sogras e Lagartos" Episode: "Intimidades"
2011	Tapas & Beijos	Leda	Episode: "August 23"
2013	Sangue Bom	Glória Pais	

=== Film ===
Year	Title	Role
1958	Alegria de Viver	Sílvia
1958	Pista de Grama	
1964	Black God, White Devil	Rosa
1965	Society em Baby-Doll	
1967	A Opinião Pública	

== Stage ==
- Terror e Miséria
- Os Físicos
- Society em Baby-Doll
- Os Inimigos Não Mandam Flores
- Balbina de Inhansãn
- Vestido de Noiva
- Mulher Integral
- Falcão-peregrino
- Vagas para Moças de Fino Trato
- A Partilha
- O Milagre da Santa
