= Eduardo Galvão =

Brazilian actor (1962–2020)

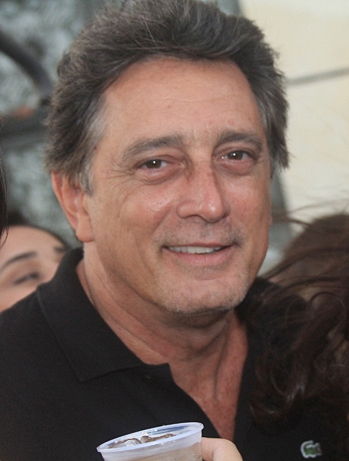
- Born: Eduardo Galvão; 19 April 1962; Rio de Janeiro, Brazil
- Died: 7 December 2020 (aged 58); Rio de Janeiro, Brazil
- Occupation: Actor
- Years active: 1989–2020
- Children: 1

Eduardo Galvão (19 April 1962 – 7 December 2020) was a Brazilian actor. He participated in the Caça Talentos program, on Rede Globo, alongside Angélica. He died on the night of 7 December 2020, aged 58, of COVID-19 during the COVID-19 pandemic in Brazil. The 7th-day mass in his honour was celebrated on 14 December 2020.

== Career ==
Galvão debuted in soap operas at the age of 27, in O Salvador da Pátria, in 1989. His most prominent roles were Paschoal Papagaio, in Despedida de Solteiro, in 1992, Mauro Botelho in A Viagem, in 1994 and Arthur Carneiro, in the series Caça- Talents, from 1996 to 1998, Otacilio Ferraço in Porto dos Milagres in 2001, Armando Bananeira in O Beijo do Vampiro in 2002 and as Dr. Roger Machado in Bom Sucesso in 2019.

== Filmography ==
=== Film ===
Year	Title	Role	Notes
1999	Tiradentes	Tomás Antônio Gonzaga	
2001	Minha Vida em Suas Mãos	Roberto	
2006	Didi, o Caçador de Tesouros	Capitão Nigel	
2009	Flordelis: Basta uma Palavra para Mudar	Carlos Werneck	
2015	Turbulência	—N/a	
2016	Em Nome da Lei	Elton	
2016	Turbulência	Pai de Beto	
2017	Um Tio Quase Perfeito	Gustavo	
2018	Nada a Perder	Monsenhor José Maria	
2019	Primeiros Amigos	Ricardo	
2019	Nada a Perder 2	Monsenhor José Maria	
2020	Um Tio Quase Perfeito 2	Gustavo	(final film role)

=== Television ===
Year	Title	Role	Broadcast
1989	O Salvador da Pátria	Régis de Abreu	Rede Globo
1990	Araponga	Felipe	Rede Globo
1992	Despedida de Solteiro	Paschoal Cavini (Paschoal Papagaio)	Rede Globo
1994	A Viagem	Mauro Botelho	Rede Globo
1995	As Pupilas do Senhor Reitor	Fernão de Ribeira	SBT
1996	O Fim do Mundo	José Otávio (Dr. Otávio)	Rede Globo
1996-1998	Caça Talentos	Arthur Carneiro	Rede Globo
1999	Chiquinha Gonzaga	Tenente Martim	Rede Globo
1999	O Belo e as Feras	Miguel	Rede Globo
1999	Mulher	André	Rede Globo
2001	Porto dos Milagres	Otacílio Ferraço	Rede Globo
2001	Os Normais	Estevão	Rede Globo
2001	O Clone	Alex	Rede Globo
2002	O Beijo do Vampiro	Armando Bananeiras	Rede Globo
2004	A Diarista	Sérgio	Rede Globo
2004	Começar de Novo	Artur Rios (Paulo)	Rede Globo
2005	Sob Nova Direção	Ricardo	Rede Globo
2005	Casseta & Planeta, Urgente!	Psiquiatra	Rede Globo
2006	Um Menino muito Maluquinho	Pedro (Pai do Menino Maluquinho)	TVE Brasil
2006	Avassaladoras: A Série	Danilo	RecordTV
2007	Amazônia, de Galvez a Chico Mendes	Joaquim Vítor	Rede Globo
2007	Paraíso Tropical	Urbano Monteiro	Rede Globo
2007	Dance Dance Dance	Lúcio Pimentel	Rede Bandeirantes
2008	Toma Lá, Dá Cá	Douglas Sábato	Rede Globo
2009	Uma Noite no Castelo	Rei	Rede Globo
2010	S.O.S. Emergência	Otávio	Rede Globo
2011	Insensato Coração	Wagner Peixoto	Rede Globo
2012	Dercy de Verdade	Walter Pinto	Rede Globo
2012	Malhação: Intensa como a Vida	Mário Costa	Rede Globo
2016	Malhação: Seu Lugar no Mundo	Jorge Almeida	Rede Globo
2016	Sol Nascente	Caco (Motociclista)	Rede Globo
2015-2016	Magnífica 70	Flávio Gonçalves	HBO Brasil
2013	Adorável Psicose	Eduardo	Multishow
2013	Vai que Cola	Astolfo Gomide	Rede Globo
2014	Em Família	Pedro Paulo	Rede Globo
2014	Questão de Família	Jorge Fernandes	GNT
2017	Apocalipse	Alan Gudman	RecordTV
2019	Bom Sucesso	Dr. Roger Machado	Rede Globo
