= Luíza Curvo =

Brazilian actress

- Born: Luíza Touché de Almeida; June 3, 1985 (age 39); Rio de Janeiro, Brazil
- Occupation: Actress
- Spouse: José Roberto Jardim (2005-2012)

Luíza Touché de Almeida (June 3, 1985 in Rio de Janeiro) is a Brazilian actress.

== Personal life ==
She was married to actor and director José Roberto Jardim; member of the theater group "Os Fofos Encenam" of São Paulo.

== Career ==
=== TV ===
Television
Year	Title	Role	Notes
1993	Sonho Meu	Ana (Aninha)	
1995	Quatro por Quatro	Renata	Episodes: "January 16–April 15"
1995	Engraçadinha... Seus Amores e Seus Pecados	Letícia (child)	First phase
1995	Cara & Coroa	Isabel Brandão Alcântara Prates (Belinha)	
1996	Você Decide		Episode: "Dilema de Amor"
1996	Malhação	Jade Margaret Shue	Season 2
1997	O Amor Está no Ar	Tatiana Guimarães Ribeiro	
1998	Corpo Dourado	Clara (child)	Special participation
1998	Era uma Vez...	Maria da Glória Kleiner Giunquetti (Glorinha)	
1999	Você Decide	Maria da Silva Alves	Episode: "Numa Sexta-Feira 13: Part 1"
1999	Você Decide	Maria da Silva Alves	Episode: "Numa Sexta-Feira 13: Part 2"
2000	Você Decide	Silvinha	Episode: "A Dama Proibida"
2001	Porto dos Milagres	Cecília Palmeirão	First phase
2001	A Turma do Didi	Maria	Episode: "Tem Ladrão na Fazenda"
2002	Desejos de Mulher	Juliette de Gog	Special participation
2002	Sabor da Paixão	Kátia Reis	
2003	Sítio do Picapau Amarelo	Viviana	Episode: "A Lenda do Rei Arthur"
2003	Chocolate com Pimenta	Cássia Gonçalves Lima	
2004	Sitcom.br	Patrícia	Episode: "Coisinha do Papai"
2005	Retrato Falado	Giovanna	Special of the Fantástico
2006	Cidadão Brasileiro	Lívia Pereira	
2007	Luz do Sol	Priscila Marins	
2008	Chamas da Vida	Michele Cavalcanti Gomes	
2011	Sansão e Dalila	Myra	
2012	Máscaras	Laís Neves	
2014	Milagres de Jesus	Jéssica	Episode: "A Ressurreição do Filho da Viúva"
2014	Conselho Tutelar	Rosângela	Season 1; special participation
2014	Amor Custa Caro	Raquel	Year-end special

=== Cinema ===
Films
Year	Title	Role
2002	Avassaladoras	Priscila
2007	Mundo Animal	
2008	Bellini and the Devil	Clarisse
2009	Ouro Negro - A Saga do Petróleo Brasileiro	Luísa
2009	Uma Mulher	
