= Helena Ranaldi =

Brazilian actress (born 1966)

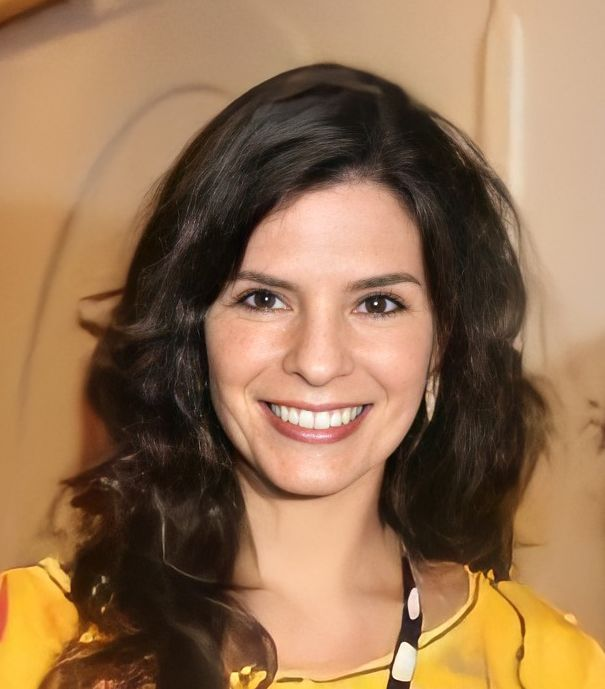
- Ranaldi in 2011
- Born: Helena Ranaldi Nogueira; May 24, 1966 (age 59); São Paulo, Brazil
- Occupations: Actress; model
- Years active: 1989–present
- Spouses: Ricardo Waddington (m. 1994; div. 2004) Max Sette (m. 2008; div. 2010)
- Children: 1

Helena Ranaldi Nogueira (born May 24, 1966) is a Brazilian actress.

== Biography ==
After doing some modeling jobs and television commercials, she was ranked among the five finalists of Supermodel of the World - Step Brazil, 1989, sponsored by Class Modelos and Ford Model Agency in the U.S. With the money she earned, she took a course in theater acting. At age 23, she moved from São Paulo to Rio de Janeiro.

In her first work in 1990, she portrayed Stefânia in the soap opera A História de Ana Raio e Zé Trovão. The following year, she acted in another soap opera on television, Amazônia, before moving to Rede Globo.

In 1992, already hired by Rede Globo, she played Nina in Despedida de Solteiro. A year later, while acting in the soap opera Olho no Olho, she met director Ricardo Waddington, whom she married; they had a son, Pedro.

In 1996, Ranaldi starred in Fantástico alongside Pedro Bial, but the role was short-lived because in July of that year, she began appearing as a central character on the soap opera Anjo de Mim, which was directed by Ricardo Waddington.

As a result of her work with author Manoel Carlos, Ranaldi appeared in: Laços de Família (2000); Presença de Anita (2001); and Mulheres Apaixonadas (2003). In 2002, she portrayed the protagonist in the telenovela Coração de Estudante, and played in the miniseries Um Só Coração in 2004.

In 2008, Ranaldi appeared in A Favorita alongside Malvino Salvador. She starred in the telenovela Fina Estampa, with Carlos Casagrande, Guilherme Leicam and Tania Khalill in 2012, and in 2014, appeared in Em Família.

In 2015, Ranaldi acted in the series As Canalhas, from GNT, and in the CQC comedy Band, with Dan Stulbach.

== Personal life ==
The actress was married to Ricardo Waddington, a Global TV soap opera and series director, for 10 years and had a son, Pedro. The couple separated in January 2004.

== Filmography ==
=== Television ===
Year	Title	Role	Notes
1990	A História de Ana Raio e Zé Trovão	Stefânia	
1991	Amazônia	Andréa	
1992	Despedida de Solteiro	Nina Salgado	
1993	Caso Especial	Lucíola	Episode: "Lucíola"
1993	Você Decide	Ana	Episode: "A Sangue Frio"
1993	Olho no Olho	Malena Maia	
1994	Você Decide	Raquel	Episode: "Copacabana"
1994	Quatro por Quatro	Mércia Arruda Franco / Suzana Sales	
1995	Você Decide	Lídia	Episode: "Paixão Bandida"
1995	Explode Coração	Larissa	
1996	Fantástico	Presenter	
1996	Anjo de Mim	Joana	
1998	Mulher	Marília	Special participation
1999	Andando nas Nuvens	Dra. Lídia Leblon	
2000	Laços de Família	Cíntia Martins	
2001	Presença de Anita	Lúcia Helena Reis	
2002	Coração de Estudante	Clara Gouveia	
2003	Mulheres Apaixonadas	Raquel de Almeida Trindade	
2004	Um Só Coração	Lídia Rosemberg	
2004	Senhora do Destino	Yara Steiner	
2005	Carga Pesada	Vitória	Episode: "Vem Dançar"
2006	Páginas da Vida	Márcia Fragoso Martins de Andrade Pinheiro	
2008	A Favorita	Dedina Barreto	
2010	Malhação	Tereza Marins	Season 18
2012	Fina Estampa	Chiara Passarelli	Episodes: "January 3–March 12, 2012"
2014	Em Família	Verônica Saldanha dos Santos	
2015	As Canalhas	Amanda	Episode: "Amanda"
2018	O Mecanismo	Eva Balesteri	Participation
2018	O Doutrinador	Júlia Machado	
2019	Carcereiros	Leila	Season 2

=== Films ===
Year	Title	Role	Notes
2008	Bodas de Papel	Nina	
2011	Tancredo: A Travessia	Alzira Vargas	Documentary
2018	Minha Mãe, Minha Filha	Isabel	Short film
2018	O Doutrinador	Júlia Machado	
2024	Cordel do Amor Sem Fim	Madalena	

== Theater ==
Year	Title	Notes
1989	Ensaios do Grupo Macunaíma: Macunaíma, Boca de Ouro e Nova Velha Estória	1989-1991
1994	Entre Amigos	
1998	Os Sete Gatinhos	
1999	Arthur Bispo do Rosário - A Via Sacra dos Contrários	
2000	Bonitinha mas Ordinária	
2007	Preciosas Ridículas	
2009	A Música Segunda	
2011	O Caso Valquíria	
2014	Amor Perverso	
2015	A Fantástica Casa de Bonecas	
2015	Amores Urbanos	
2016	A Paixão Segundo Nelson Rodrigues - Uma farsa musical	
2017	Se Existe Eu Ainda Não Encontrei	
2019	Cordel do Amor Sem Fim	
2020	Protocolo Volpone	
2024	Por Trás das Flores	
