= Rita Guedes =

Brazilian actress (born 1972)

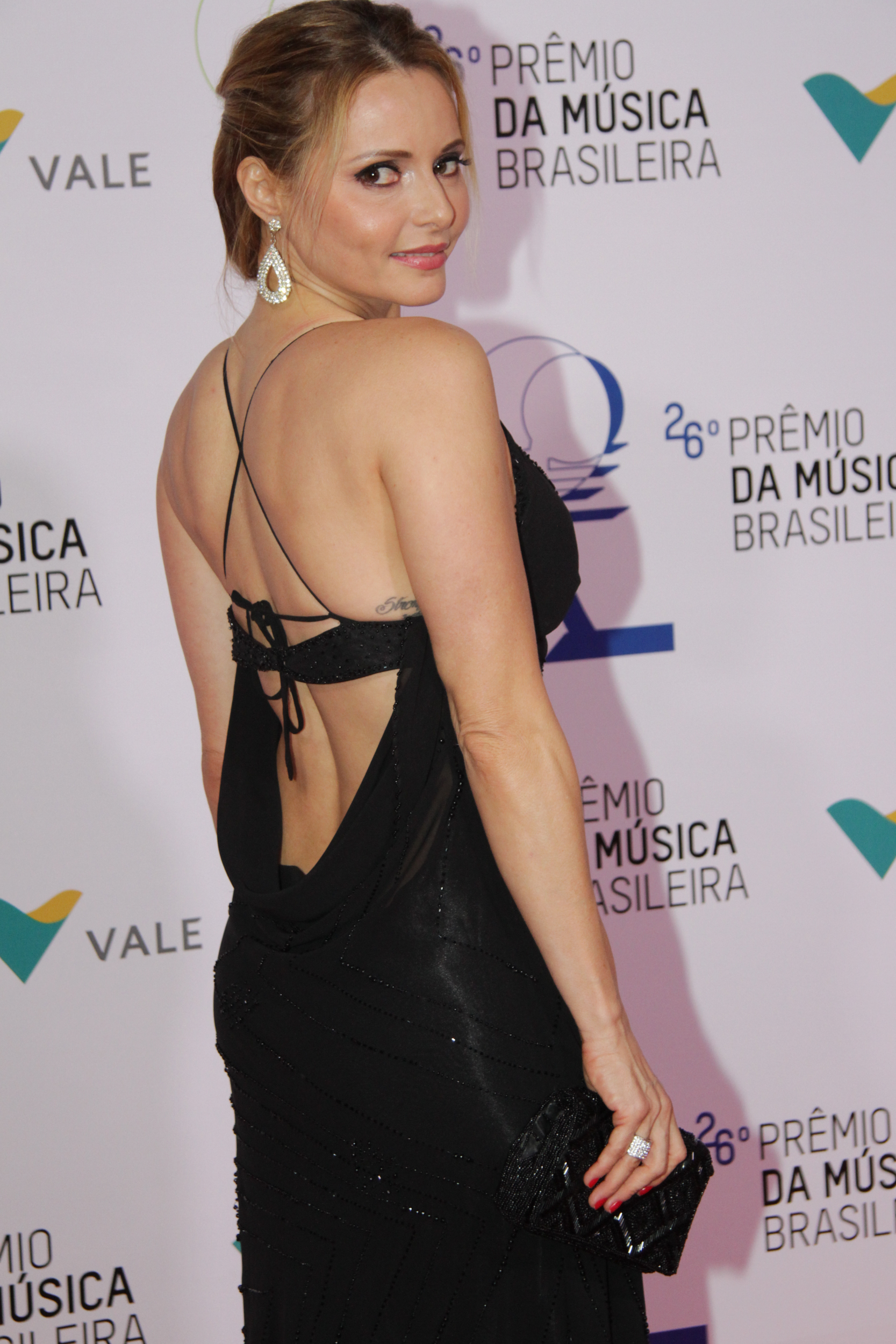
- Guedes at the 26th Brazilian Music Awards in 2015
- Born: Rita de Cássia de Sousa Guedes; 2 January 1972 (age 54); Catanduva, São Paulo, Brazil
- Occupation: Actress
- Website: www.ritaguedes.com.br

Rita de Cássia de Sousa Guedes (born 2 January 1972) is a Brazilian actress.

== Biography ==
At 14 Rita joined the theater group Roda Viva, which is developed and presented their work at the Teatro Municipal Catanduva, under the direction of Tabajara Fields. At 17 he moved Catanduva to Campinas, where she soon joined the theater company Mambembe: the Santa Sia. At age 19 she moved to São Paulo.

When the novel opens Despedida de Solteiro saw her career take off, both on television and in theater. Rita Guedes has more than 10 novels, three feature films, seven shorts, more than 10 plays and numerous interests in series, such as Carga Pesada Program and Você Decide.

In March 2006, Guedes was featured in the Brazilian edition of Playboy.

== Filmography ==
=== Television ===
Year	Title	Role	Note
1992	Despedida de Solteiro	Bianca Salgado Souza Bastos	
1993	Olho no Olho	Pinky	
1994	Você Decide		Episode: "A Vida Não Acabou"
1994	Você Decide	Myriam	Episode: "Possessão"
1994	Você Decide		Episode: "O Preço do Amor"
1995	Irmãos Coragem	Paula	
1995	Você Decide		Episode: "Jóia Rara"
1996	Quem É Você?	Irina	
1996	Você Decide		Episode: "Não Se Esqueça de Mim"
1997	A Justiceira		Episode: "O Navio Luminoso"
1997	Você Decide	Norma	Episode: "Norma"
1997	Você Decide		Episode: "Francis"
1997	Malhação	Luana	Season 3; Special participation
1998	Você Decide		Episode: "Ato Covarde"
1998	Você Decide	Maura	Episode: "O Escândalo"
1999	Você Decide		Episode: "O Feitiço da Lua da Arábia"
1999	Andando nas Nuvens	Vanessa Uau	
1999	Você Decide		Episode: "Bruxaria"
2000	Você Decide		Episode: "Uma Lição das Arábias"
2000	Uga-Uga	Stella	
2001	Bambuluá	Paula	Special participation
2001	Malhação	Flávia	Season 8; Special participation
2002	Desejos de Mulher	Kênia	Episodes: "March 17–22, 2002"
2002	Brava Gente		Episode: "A Cidade que o Diabo Esqueceu"
2002	Brava Gente	Matilde	Episode: "Entre o Céu e a Terra"
2003	Brava Gente	Zuline	Episode: "O Dia do Amor"
2004	Da Cor do Pecado	Mariana	Episodes: "March 9–April 23, 2004"
2004	Sítio do Picapau Amarelo	Amorzinho	Episode: "A Menina da Selva"
2005	Alma Gêmea	Kátia (Anja)	
2006	Camilo em Sarilhos	Carminho	Episode: "O Ponto"
2006	Sob Nova Direção	Daniele	Episode: "Madrinha Só Tem Uma"
2006	Carga Pesada	Marcinha	Episode: "Triângulo das Bermudas"
2006	Cobras & Lagartos	Cacá	Episodes: "October 24–26, 2006"
2006	Papai Noel Existe	Sônia	Television special
2007	Eterna Magia	Matilde Sotero O'Neill	
2007	Faça Sua História	Ivonete	Episode: "Pilot"
2008	Casos e Acasos	Carol	Episode: "A Nova Namorada, o Chefe e o Dia Fértil"
2008	Toma Lá, Dá Cá	Vanessa	Episode: "O Pecado Malha ao Lado"
2008	Casos e Acasos	Ivete	Episode: "A Volta, a Cena e as Férias"
2009	Caminho das Índias	Police chief Inocência	Episode: "April 7, 2009"
2010	Malhação	Marlene	Season 18; Special participation
2012	As Brasileiras	Astrid Meireles	Episode: "A De Menor do Amazonas"
2012	Avenida Brasil	Nicole	Episodes: "September 28–October 2, 2012"
2013	Flor do Caribe	Doralice	
2014	Questão de Família	Neusa	Episode: "Não Tão Simples: Parte 1"
2017	1 Contra Todos	Telma Dirceu	Season 2
2020	Arcanjo Renegado	Manuela Berengher	

=== Film ===
Year	Title	Role	Note
1993	Tudo o Que Você Sempre Quis Saber Sobre o Amor		Short film
1998	O Maior		Short film
2002	Separações	Opening Night Guest	Uncredited
2003	Sintomas		Short film
2003	Quem É?		Short film
2004	O Xadrez das Cores	Second employee	Short film
2004	Procuradas	Angela	
2005	O Farol de Santo Agostinho	Mother	Short film
2006	O Caso Morel	Carmem	
2006	Gatão de Meia Idade	Eleonora, ex-girlfriend	
2009	Fumando Espero	Herself	Documentary
2011	Qualquer Gato Vira-Lata	Ângela	
2015	Qualquer Gato Vira-Lata 2	Ângela	
2016	Mar Inquieto	Anita	
