= A Próxima Vítima =

Brazilian telenovela

- Genre: Telenovela; Thriller; Suspense
- Created by: Silvio de Abreu
- Written by: Silvio de Abreu; Alcides Nogueira; Maria Adelaide Amaral
- Directed by: Jorge Fernando; Rogério Gomes; Marcelo Travesso; Alexandre Boury
- Starring: José Wilker; Tony Ramos; Susana Vieira; Aracy Balabanian; Cláudia Ohana; Natália do Vale; Paulo Betti; Yoná Magalhães; Gianfrancesco Guarnieri; Vivianne Pasmanter; Marcos Frota; Cecil Thiré; Lima Duarte; Alexandre Borges; Otavio Augusto; Rosamaria Murtinho; Tereza Rachel
- Opening theme: "Vítima"
- Composers: Rita Lee and Roberto de Carvalho
- Country of origin: Brazil
- Original language: Portuguese
- No. of episodes: 203

Production
- Running time: 45 minutes

Original release
- Network: TV Globo
- Release: March 13 – November 3, 1995

A Próxima Vítima (English: The Next Victim) is a Brazilian telenovela that was produced and aired by TV Globo from March 13, 1995, to November 3, 1995, totaling 203 chapters.

Featured José Wilker, Tony Ramos, Susana Vieira, Aracy Balabanian, Lima Duarte, Natália do Vale, Vivianne Pasmanter, Marcos Frota, Yoná Magalhães, Gianfrancesco Guarnieri, Tereza Rachel, Cecil Thiré and Cláudia Ohana in leading roles.

== Cast ==
Actor	Character
José Wilker (†)	Marcelo Rossi
Susana Vieira	Ana Carvalho
Tony Ramos	José Carlos Mestieri (Juca)
Aracy Balabanian (†)	Filomena Ferreto Giardini
Gianfrancesco Guarnieri (†)	Eliseo Giardini
Cláudia Ohana	Isabela Ferreto Vasconcellos Rossi
Natália do Vale	Helena Braga Ribeiro
Otávio Augusto	Ulisses Carvalho
Tereza Rachel (†)	Francesca Ferreto Rossi
Cecil Thiré (†)	Adalberto Vasconcellos
Vivianne Pasmanter	Irene Braga Ribeiro
Lima Duarte	José Mestieri (Zé Bolacha)
Yoná Magalhães (†)	Carmela Ferreto Vasconcellos (Cacá)
Marcos Frota	Diego Bueno
Vera Holtz	Quitéria Bezerra (Quitéria Quarta-Feira)
Nicette Bruno (†)	Nina Jiovanni
Flávio Migliaccio (†)	Vittorio Jiovanni (Vitinho)
Glória Menezes (†)	Júlia Braga
Francisco Cuoco (†)	Hélio Ribeiro
Paulo Betti	Detetive Olavo Rodrigues de Melo
Rosamaria Murtinho	Romana Ferreto
Alexandre Borges	Bruno Biondi
Zezé Motta	Fátima Noronha
Antônio Pitanga	Cléber Noronha
Vera Gimenez	Andréa Barcellos
Mila Moreira (†)	Carla
Norton Nascimento (†)	Sidney Noronha
Isabel Fillardis	Rosângela Moraes
André Gonçalves	Sandro Carvalho Rossi (Sandrinho)
Carlos Eduardo Dolabella (†)	Giggio De Angelis
Lui Mendes	Jefferson Noronha
Selton Mello	Antônio Carlos Mestieri (Tonico)
Deborah Secco	Carina Carvalho Rossi
Eduardo Felipe	Giulio Carvalho Rossi
Camila Pitanga	Patrícia Noronha
Roberto Bataglin	Cláudio Ramos
Georgiana Góes	Iara Mestieri
Pedro Vasconcellos	Lucas Braga Ribeiro
Lugui Palhares	Adriano Raposo do Amaral
Liana Duval (†)	Ivete Bezerra
José Augusto Branco	Josias da Silva
Lídia Mattos (†)	Diva da Silva
Vítor Branco	Alfredo Bianchini
Patricya Travassos	Solange Lopes
Nizo Neto	Marco
Andréa Avancini	Teca
Washington Gonzales	Eduardo da Silva (Duda Maluco)
Hilda Rebello (†)	Zulmira
Catarina Abdalla	Marizete
Marcelo Barros	Cuca
Lucy Mafra (†)	Alcina
Edgard Amorim	Miroldo
Patrick de Oliveira	Arizinho
