= Susana Werner =

Brazilian model and actress (born 1977)

- Born: 20 July 1977 (age 48); Rio de Janeiro, Brazil
- Occupation(s): Actress and model
- Spouse: Júlio César (m. 2002)
- Children: 2

Susana Werner (born 20 July 1977) is a Brazilian model and actress. Werner's parents are Kátia and Avelino Werner. Her family is of German descent.

== Personal life ==
From 1997 to 1999, Susana Werner had a relationship with Brazilian footballer Ronaldo. Later, she married the Brazilian goalkeeper Júlio César. The couple has two children.

In June 2013, Werner was robbed at gunpoint after her car was stopped as she drove through Fortaleza late at night.

== Filmography ==
=== Film ===
Year	Title	Role
2005	Opressão	Priscila
2003	Deus É Brasileiro	Senhorita Agá
1998	Donne in bianco	Sabrina

=== Television ===
Year	Title	Role
2007	Luz do Sol	Georgiana Magalhães de Sá
2007	Sete Pecados	Amiga de Elvira
2007	Sunshine	Georgiana
2002	Sítio do Picapau Amarelo	Sereia Serena
2000	Você Decide	
1999	Woman	Marcela Maciel
1999	Vila Madalena	Bia
1997	Malhação	Mariana Salgueiro
