= Olho no Olho =

- Created by: Antônio Calmon
- Directed by: Ricardo Waddington
- Starring: Tony Ramos; Natália do Vale; Maria Zilda Bethlem; Reginaldo Faria; Helena Ranaldi; Felipe Folgosi; Patrícia de Sabrit; Nico Puig; Alessandra Negrini
- Opening theme: Magnificat by Rútila Máquina
- Country of origin: Brazil
- Original language: Portuguese
- No. of episodes: 185

Production
- Production location: Brazil
- Running time: 50 minutes

Original release
- Network: TV Globo
- Release: 6 September 1993 – 8 April 1994

Related
- O Mapa da Mina; A Viagem

Olho no Olho (English: Eye to Eye or The Eye Of Fury) is a Brazilian telenovela created by Antônio Calmon. It was produced and aired by TV Globo from September 6, 1993, to April 8, 1994.

== Cast ==
Actor/Actress	Character
Tony Ramos	Guido Bellini
Felipe Folgosi	Aleph
Reginaldo Faria	Cézar Zapata
Natália do Vale	Débora
Nico Puig	Fred
Helena Ranaldi	Malena
Maria Zilda Bethlem	Walkíria
Patrícia de Sabrit	Cacau
Eva Todor	Veridiana
Antônio Calloni	Bóris
Patricia Travassos	Duda
Gerson Brenner	Guto
Sérgio Mamberti	Popô
Cleyde Yáconis	Julieta
Rita Guedes	Pinky
Sérgio Viotti	Jorginho
Tony Tornado	Gilberto
Cristina Prochaska	Elza
Iara Jamra	Telma
Fábio Junqueira	Ramos
Emiliano Queiroz	Desconhecido
Rosita Thomaz Lopes	Dinah
Patrícia Perrone	Tininha
Henrique Farias	Borrão
Rodrigo Penna	J.C.
Bel Kutner	Júlia Grilo
Danielle Winits	Dominique
Thales Pan Chacon	Patrício
Petrônio Gontijo	Marco
Lyla Collares	Lana
Dill Costa	Léa
Fernando Almeida	Bastião
Felipe Pinheiro	Bob Walter
Alessandra Negrini	Clara
Selton Mello	Juca
Rodrigo Santoro	Pedro
Marcelo Gonçalves	Dino
Nani Venâncio	Luana
Tadeu Aguiar	Lima
Mário Gomes	Bruno
Jorge Dória	Átila

=== Special participations ===
- Monah Delacy - Lenira
- Paulo José - Menelau Zapata
- Stênio Garcia - Armando
- Sérgio Britto - Padre João
- Marcos Paulo - Otávio (Débora's husband)
- Ítalo Rossi - Ferreira
- Arduino Colassanti - Padre Inácio

== Soundtrack ==
=== National soundtrack ===
Capa: Gerson Brenner

1. "Gênese" - Paulo Ricardo and RPM
2. "Agora Ou Jamais" - Tigres de Bengala
3. "Oração de Amor" - Paula Morelenbaum
4. "Fúria e Folia" - Barão Vermelho
5. "Homem Que Sabia Demais" - Skank
6. "Magnificat" - Rútila Máquina (opening theme)
7. "Submundo Vaticano" - Lulu Santos
8. "Down Em Mim" - Edson Cordeiro
9. "Deus Apareça na Televisão" - Kid Abelha
10. "Será Que Sou Eu" - Paulinho Moska
11. "Não Tem Solução" - Zizi Possi
12. "Toda Noite" - Edmon
13. "Por Toda Parte" - Franco Perini

=== International soundtrack ===
Capa: Rita Guedes

1. "What's Up" - 4 Non Blondes
2. "Boom Shack-A-Lak" - Apache Indian
3. "Boy, You're The One" - Trinere
4. "Informer" - Snow
5. "How You Gonna See Me Now" - Easy Rider
6. "Vas-Y Vas-Y" - Isabelle Camille
7. "To Be With You" - Mc RNT
8. "Step It Up" - Stereo MCs
9. "A Million Love Songs" - Take That
10. "Regret" - New Order
11. "Cose della vita" - Eros Ramazzotti
12. "Merry-go-round" - Deborah Blando
13. "Ça C'est Paris" - Gilbert
14. "Are You Ready to Fly" - Rozalla
