= Natália do Vale =

Brazilian actress (born 1953)

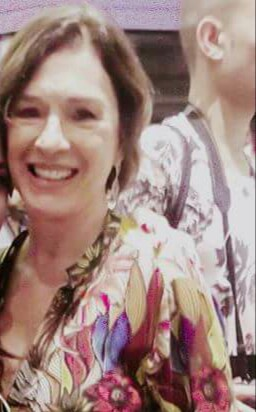
- Born: 6 March 1953 (age 73); Floriano, Piauí, Brazil
- Occupation: Actress
- Years active: 1975–present

Natália do Vale (born March 6, 1953) is a Brazilian actress. She appeared in leading roles in several television programs, including Olho no Olho, Água Viva and Women in Love.

== Biography ==
Vale was born in Floriano, the daughter of Portuguese immigrants who moved to Brazil in search of better financial conditions. She had only one brother, named Antonio Ferreira do Vale. Her parents and brother are already deceased.

In the 70s, she moved with his family to São Paulo in search of better living conditions. In São Paulo, Natália took the entrance exam and graduated in philosophy from the University of São Paulo. To help support the household, she worked as an intern, assisting a geography teacher in the course of pre-university entrance exams.

== Filmography ==
=== Television ===
Year	Title	Character
1975	Gabriela	Aurora
1975	A Moreninha	Mademoiselle Aimée
1976	Saramandaia	Dora
1977	Locomotivas	Sandra (participação especial)
1979	Carga Pesada	Maria
1979	Malu Mulher	Vilma
1980	Água Viva	Márcia Mesquita
1981	Baila Comigo	Lúcia Toledo Fernandes
1982	Sétimo Sentido	Sandra Rivoredo
1982	Final Feliz	Débora Brandão
1984	Transas e Caretas	Marília Braga
1986	Cambalacho	Andréia Pereira Souza e Silva
1987	O Outro	Laura Della Santa
1989	Que Rei Sou Eu?	Suzanne Webert
1990	Delegacia de Mulheres	Daisy (Episódio: Elas não Usam Black-tie)
1993	Olho no Olho	Débora
1995	A Próxima Vítima	Helena Ribeiro
1996	Sai de Baixo	Amelinha Berniê de Carvalho
1997	O Amor Está no Ar	Júlia Schneider
1998	Torre de Babel	Lúcia Prado
2000	Aquarela do Brasil	Dulce
2003	Mulheres Apaixonadas	Sílvia Ferreira Lobo
2004	Começar de Novo	Letícia Pessoa Karamazov
2004	Carga Pesada	Maria
2006	Páginas da Vida	Carmem Fragoso Martins de Andrade
2007	O Segredo da Princesa Lili	Rainha
2008	Faça sua História	Passageira
2008	Negócio da China	Drª Júlia Dumas
2009	Viver a Vida	Ingrid Guimarães Machado
2011	Insensato Coração	Wanda Brandão
2012	Salve Jorge	Aída Flores Galvão
2014	Em Família	Francisca Fernandes (Chica)
2016	Êta Mundo Bom!	Neuza Maria Sampaio, a Baronesa de Goytacazes (1 Fase)
2017	Os Dias Eram Assim	Quitéria Sampaio (Kiki)
2018	Orgulho e Paixão	Lady Margareth Williamson
2019	A Dona do Pedaço	Beatriz

=== Film ===
- 1981 – Kilas, o Mau da Fita – Lily-Bobó
- 1983 – Pra Frente Brasil – Marta
- 2007 – Polaroides Urbanas – Paula

== Theatre ==
- 1978 – Bonifácio Bilhões
- 1979 – A Calça – Luisa
- 1979 – Roda Cor de Roda
- 1990 – A Partilha – Selma
- 2000 – A Vida Passa – Selma
- 2002 – Capitanias Hereditárias – Stella
