= Despedida de Solteiro =

- Genre: Telenovela
- Created by: Walther Negrão
- Directed by: Reynaldo Boury; Cláudio Cavalcanti; Carlos Manga Jr.
- Starring: Felipe Camargo; Tássia Camargo; Lúcia Veríssimo; Paulo Gorgulho; Marcos Paulo; Elias Gleizer; Lolita Rodrigues; Eduardo Galvão; Lucinha Lins; Mauro Mendonça; Cristina Mullins; Helena Ranaldi; Jayme Periard; Rita Guedes; Ana Rosa; João Vitti; Yoná Magalhães; Othon Bastos; Sérgio Viotti see more
- Opening theme: Sugar, Sugar by DJ Les and The Kool Kat feat. The Archies
- Country of origin: Brazil
- Original language: Portuguese
- No. of episodes: 206

Production
- Production location: Brazil
- Running time: 50 minutes

Original release
- Network: Rede Globo
- Release: June 1, 1992 – January 30, 1993

Despedida de Solteiro (English: Bachelor Party) is a Brazilian telenovela produced and broadcast by Rede Globo in 1992.

== Cast ==
Actor/Actress	Character
Paulo Gorgulho	Pedro Da Vinci
Lúcia Veríssimo	Flávia Souza Bastos
Felipe Camargo	João Marcos Batista Barbosa
Tássia Camargo	Lenita (Madalena Chaddad Santarém)
Jayme Periard	Mike (Michael O'Brien)
Elias Gleizer	Vitório Da Vinci
Eduardo Galvão	Paschoal Papagaio (Paschoal Cavini)
Lucinha Lins	Marta Cavini
Maria Estela	Inês Chaddad
Ana Rosa	Soraya
Cristina Mullins	Maria do Socorro Batista Barbosa
Bárbara Fazzio	Regina Santarém
Othon Bastos	Jorge Jordão
Jacyra Sampaio	Elza
André Valli	Gil
Léa Camargo	Dona Dala (Idalina Batista Barbosa)
Cinira Camargo	Glória
Patrícia Perrone	Paula Chaddad
Frederico Mayrink	Dudu (Eduardo Chaddad)
Danton Mello	Rafa
Maria Duda	Penha
Guga Coelho	Franco
Castro Gonzaga	Juiz
Patrick de Oliveira	"Léo" (Leonardo Da Vinci II)
Fernanda Nobre	Abigail "Bibi" Chaddad Santarém
Helena Ranaldi	Nina
Rita Guedes	Bianca Souza Bastos
João Vitti	Xampú (Matheus Souza Bastos)
Sérgio Viotti	Dr. Gabriel Chaddad
Mauro Mendonça	Sirineo, the Farfan
Lolita Rodrigues	Emília Souza Bastos
Yoná Magalhães	Lola
Marcos Paulo	Sérgio Santarém

=== Special participation ===
- Gabriela Alves - Salete
- Geórgia Gomide - cartomante
- Mário Lago - Padre
- Paulo Goulart - Delegado
- Barbara Dewet - Lenita (child)
- Lafayette Galvão - Padre
- Chico Tenreiro
- Ênio Santos
- Felipe Carone
- Germano Filho
- Cleyde Blota
- Alexandre Lippiani - Roger
- Lina Fróes
- Newton Martins - Jorge
- Naura Schneider - Beth
- Mário Cardoso
- David Cardoso - Corumbá
- Pierre Bittencourt - Sérgio Santarém (child)
- Buza Ferraz - Yan
- José Augusto Branco - Dr. Cintra
- Letícia Spiller - Debbie
- Leila Lopes - Carol
- Alice de Carli - Janete
- Jussara Calmon - Dorinha
- Egon Júnior - Guto
- Lu Frota - Fafá
- Karina Mello - Simone
- Vicente Barcellos - Damasceno
