= A Indomada =

- La Indomable
- Genre: Telenovela
- Created by: Aguinaldo Silva; Ricardo Linhares
- Starring: Adriana Esteves; Eva Wilma; José Mayer; Ary Fontoura; Cláudio Marzo; Renata Sorrah; Betty Faria; Paulo Betti; Luíza Tomé; Ana Lúcia Torre; Licurgo Spínola; Eliane Giardini; Flávio Galvão; Pedro Paulo Rangel; Marcos Frota; José de Abreu; Marcos Winter; Nívea Stelmann
- Opening theme: "Maracatudo"
- Composer: Sérgio Mendes
- Country of origin: Brazil
- Original language: Portuguese
- No. of episodes: 203

Production
- Running time: 60 minutes

Original release
- Network: Rede Globo
- Release: February 17 – October 11, 1997

A Indomada (English: The Untamed) is a Brazilian telenovela produced and aired by Rede Globo from February 17 to October 11, 1997. It was written by Aguinaldo Silva and Ricardo Linares, with the collaboration of Maria Elisa Berredo, Mark Silver and Nadotti Nelson; directed by Marcos Paulo Roberto Naar and Luiz Henrique Reis; and general direction and core by Marcos Paulo.

== Synopsis ==
Greenville is a fictional town on the northeastern coast of Brazil. It is built in the image of old England due to the influence of the British who, a long time before, had built the Great Western Railway. The Greenvillenses (Greenville citizens) strictly adhere to the British traditions.

Producers of sugar and molasses made this region a very wealthy place for decades; Among them is the Monguaba Factory, owned by the richest and most traditional family in Greenville, the Mendonça e Albuquerque.

Eulalia, the heiress of Monguaba, falls for the cane cutter Zé Leandro. Eulalia's older brother, Pedro Afonso, suspects Zé Leandro and forbids their relationship, going as far as threatening him. Eulalia helps Zé Leandro escape and he vows to return one day to bring her with him. Months later, Eulalia gives birth to a daughter, Lucia Helena (known only as Helena), whom she teaches to wait for her father.

Fifteen years later, a stranger named Teobaldo Faruk, arrives in town and is enamored with Eulalia; however, she is still waiting for Zé Leandro. Maria Altiva, Pedro Afonso's wife, humiliates Teobaldo, saying that a stranger without a penny is not worth approaching a Mendonça e Albuquerque. Teobaldo vows revenge and discovers that Pedro Afonso, a gambling addict, owes money to several people to whom he signed promissory notes.

One day, Zé Leandro returns, ready to flee with Eulalia and Helena and start a new life with them with the fortune he accrued from mining. After arranging the flight, he teaches Helena the value of land. However, the fleeing boat sinks and Zé Leandro drowns on the spot. Eulalia also dies, asking Helena to trust Theobaldo, who had become rich.

Altiva convinces Pedro Afonso that his sister hated him and betrayed him for fifteen years. Hurt, her husband refuses to hold Eulalia's wake in his home. Theobalds finds out and decides to take action: he buys all of Pedro Afonso's notes and becomes his sole creditor and therefore owner of all his possessions. Knowing that Pedro Afonso would be unable to pay the debt with money, he requires a different type of payment: the funeral will be at the mansion of the Mendonça e Albuquerque, and Helena will marry him in the future. In return, Pedro Afonso and his family can continue to live in the mansion and receive an allowance from Theobaldo to support themselves.

Pedro Afonso lets Helena decide, and the girl agrees to marry Theobaldo. They collaborate to send her to London to finish her studies, and only then should she return to marry the stranger. Theobald counts on having a son with Helena, in order to mix his blood with the blood of the Mendonça e Albuquerque, in order to complete his revenge against Altiva.

Ten years later, Helena returns home with Teobaldo, who gives her the factory that he won from Pedro Afonso and had kept closed for years as a wedding present. Their idea is to reopen it to give value to their lands and plantations of sugar cane, thus fulfilling the ideals of Helena's father. However, after her marriage to Theobaldo, she refuses to consummate it, which makes him mad. The conflict lasts the entire story and the two live a story of hate and love, which revolves around the city.

Twenty-eight years ago, Altiva's sister, Santa Maria (also known as Santinha), then a teenager, shared a romance with the owner of the British Club, Richard da Silva Taylor. Vexed with the happiness of her sister, who always she hated for her kindness and sympathy, Altiva, who was a married woman with child, took advantage of a drunken Richard and in the dark, pretended to be her sister to sleep with him. Santinha surprises them in bed and Altiva said he was the one taking advantage of her. Santinha breaks up with Richard, who vows never to love another woman.

Altiva finds out she is pregnant and travels with Santinha to hide the pregnancy. Traumatized, Santinha drinks to forget, and keeps looking for a new love, but only gets involved with married men. Altiva gives birth to a son, Artemio, and intends to leave him in the trash die of hunger and cold. Shocked, Santinha proposes to bring the baby home, pretending it was the son of a mill worker who abandoned him for not having the means to sustain it. Altiva reluctantly agrees, but forces her sister to hide the truth and swear that if someone is suspicious, Santinha will become Artemio's mother.

He is raised by Florencia, the maid of Mendonça e Albuquerque, who knows the truth and constantly threatens to reveal it. Artemio grows into a shy and skittish young man who falls in love with Helena. Altiva ignores him and always refuses to pronounce his name. She humiliates Santinha constantly and does everything in her power to prevent Santinha and Richard from reconnecting.

Embittered by what has happened in his life, Pedro Afonso is dominated by Altiva. Every night he loses money at the tables of the British Club before heading to the brothel. Pedro Afonso ends up falling in love with Zenilda, the energetic owner of the brothel. However, she rejects his advances as she does not want to get involved with the husband of her greatest enemy: Altiva.

Hercules is the son of Pedro Afonso and Altiva. He only appears in Greenville from time to time. At one point, tired of being sustained by Teobaldo, Altiva asks Hercules to marry Dorothy, a shy and awkward daughter of the richest man in town, Pitagoras Williams Mackenzie, who is infatuated with Altiva and resents his wife, Cleonice. Hercules runs from creditors threatening to kill him and his family as he is secretly married to the niece of Florence, Ines, with whom he has two children.

Mackenzie promises a large sum of money to Hercules if he becomes engaged to Dorothy. To save his family, Hercules eventually agrees. Ines discovers the plot and reveals herself in Greenville. Dorothy gets desperate and tries to kill herself. Artemio saves her and the two fall in love.

== Cast ==
Actor	Character
Adriana Esteves	Lúcia Helena de Mendonça e Albuquerque / Eulália (1ª phase)
José Mayer	Teobaldo Faruk
Eva Wilma	Maria Altiva Pedreira de Mendonça e Albuquerque
Cláudio Marzo	Pedro Afonso de Mendonça e Albuquerque
Ary Fontoura	Deputado Pitágoras Williams Mackenzie
Renata Sorrah	Zenilda de Holanda
Betty Faria	Miranda de Sá Maciel (Juíza Mirandinha)
Paulo Betti	Ypiranga Pitiguary
Luíza Tomé	Scarleth Mackenzie Pitiguary
Eliane Giardini	Santa Maria (Santinha)
Flávio Galvão	Richard da Silva Taylor
Marcos Frota	Artêmio
Ana Lúcia Torre	Cleonice Williams Mackenzie
Selton Mello	Emanuel Faruk
Carla Marins	Dinorah Fernandes
Cássio Gabus Mendes	Sérgio Murilo dos Santos
Marcos Winter	Hércules Pedreira de Mendonça e Albuquerque
Isabel Fillardis	Inês de Sousa de Mendonça e Albuquerque
Flávia Alessandra	Dorothy Williams Mackenzie
Mateus Rocha	Felipe de Sá Maciel
Nívea Stelmann	Carolaine Mackenzie Pitiguary
Pedro Paulo Rangel	Padre José (Joseph)
Neusa Borges	Florência
José de Abreu	Delegate Motinha
Sônia de Paula	Lourdes Maria (o Cadeirudo)
Amélia Bittencourt	Veneranda Faruk
Licurgo Spínola	Egídio Ferreira
Karla Muga	Grampola
Catarina Abdalla	Vieira
Daniela Faria	Berbela Silveira
Rodrigo Faro	Beraldo Silveira
Ingra Liberato	Paraguaia
Mônica Carvalho	Maribel
Leandra Leal	Lúcia Helena (1ª phase)
Carlos Alberto Riccelli	Zé Leandro
