= Nair Bello =

Brazilian actress and comedian

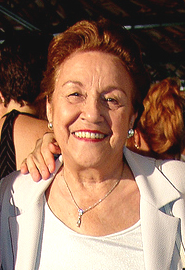
Nair Bello

Nair Bello Sousa Francisco (April 28, 1931 – April 17, 2007) was a Brazilian actress and comedian. She was born in São Paulo, and died there aged 75.

== Telenovelas ==
- 2005 - Bang Bang - as Dona Zorra (Leona Lake; special participation)
- 2003 - Kubanacan - as Dolores
- 2002 - O Quinto dos Infernos - as Giovanna (Marquesa de Pesto)
- 2000 - Uga-Uga - as Pierina
- 1998 - Torre de Babel - as Carlotinha Bimbatti
- 1998 - Era Uma Vez - as Dona Santa
- 1996 - Vira-lata - as Antonieta
- 1995 - Malhação - as Olga Prata
- 1994 - A Viagem - as Cininha
- 1993 - O Mapa da Mina - as Zilda Machado
- 1992 - Perigosas Peruas - as Dona Gema
- 1983 - Maçã do Amor (Rede Bandeirantes) - as Filomena
- 1982 - Dona Santa (Rede Bandeirantes) - as Dona Santa
- 1980 - Olhai os Lírios do Campo - as Micaela
- 1978 - João Brasileiro, o Bom Baiano (Rede Tupi) - as Pina
