= Lolita Rodrigues =

Brazilian actress, singer and presenter (1929–2023)

- Born: Sylvia Gonçalves; 10 March 1929; Santos, São Paulo, Brazil
- Died: 5 November 2023 (aged 94); João Pessoa, Paraíba, Brazil
- Occupations: Actress; singer; radio personality; television presenter
- Years active: 1939–2010
- Spouse: Aírton Rodrigues (m. 1951; sep. 1983)
- Children: 1

Sylvia Gonçalves Rodrigues Leite (née Gonçalves; 10 March 1929 – 5 November 2023), known professionally as Lolita Rodrigues, was a Brazilian actress, singer, radio personality and television presenter.

== Life and career ==
Daughter of Spanish immigrants from A Gudiña, Galicia, Rodrigues had a certain contact with music since her childhood when her parents sang Spanish and Galician folk songs.

Lolita Rodrigues was known for her musical career, during which she released many studio albums. In 1977 she was selected by Rede Globo, the Brazilian national broadcaster to represent Brazil in the sixth edition of the OTI Festival, which was held in Madrid. Her entry was a bilingual song in Spanish and Portuguese languages entitled "Pedindo Amor" (Asking for Love). Although she ended in last place, she tied with four other competing performers, and both her music and acting career went on successfully.

Rodrigues died from pneumonia on 5 November 2023, at the age of 94.

== Telenovelas ==
- 2009 – Viver a Vida .... as Noêmia
- 2006 – Pé na Jaca .... as Carmen
- 1999 / 2006 – Zorra Total (sitcom) .... as Ornela
- 2003 – Kubanacan .... as Dona Isabelita
- 2000 – Uga-Uga .... as Carmen
- 1999 – Terra Nostra .... as Dolores
- 1999 – Louca Paixão .... as Helena
- 1998 – Estrela de Fogo .... as Clara
- 1998 – Do Fundo do Coração .... as Alzira
- 1997 – Uma Janela para o Céu .... as Dona Dalva
- 1997 – Canoa do Bagre .... as Clarita
- 1996 – Razão de Viver .... as Carmen
- 1994 – A Viagem .... as Fátima
- 1992 – Despedida de Solteiro .... as Emília
- 1990 – A História de Ana Raio e Zé Trovão .... as Verônica
- 1990 – Rainha da Sucata .... as Lena
- 1987 – Sassaricando .... as Aldonza
- 1986 – Memórias de Um Gigolô (mini séries)
- 1978 – O Direito de Nascer .... as Dora
- 1972 – Quero Viver .... as Severina
- 1972 – O Tempo Não Apaga
- 1971 – Os Deuses Estão Mortos .... as Eleonora
- 1970 – As Pupilas do Senhor Reitor .... as Joana
- 1969 – Algemas de Ouro .... as Linda
- 1968 – A Última Testemunha .... as Constância
- 1966 – Anjo Marcado .... as Júlia
- 1965 – Em Busca da Felicidade .... as Anita
- 1965 – Os Quatro Filhos
- 1965 – Ontem, Hoje e Sempre .... as Laura
- 1964 – O Pintor e a Florista .... as Clélia
- 1964 – Ilsa
- 1964 – Ambição .... as Guida
- 1964 – Mãe .... as Maria
- 1963 – Aqueles que Dizem Amar-se .... as Mariana
- 1963 – 2-5499 Ocupado
