= Mulheres de Areia =

- Created by: Ivani Ribeiro
- Developed by: TV Globo
- Starring: Glória Pires; Guilherme Fontes; Marcos Frota; Raul Cortez; Suzana Vieira; Laura Cardoso; Sebastião Vasconcelos; Vivianne Pasmanter; Humberto Martins; Paulo Goulart; Andréa Beltrão; Daniel Dantas; Thaís de Campos; Adriano Reys; Nicette Bruno; Jonas Bloch; Isadora Ribeiro; Evandro Mesquita; Gabriela Alves; Karina Perez
- Opening theme: "Sexy Yemanjá" by Pepeu Gomes
- Country of origin: Brazil
- Original language: Portuguese
- No. of episodes: 203

Production
- Running time: 60 minutes

Original release
- Network: TV Globo
- Release: 1 February – 24 September 1993

Mulheres de Areia (Portuguese pronunciation: [muˈʎɛɾiʒ dʒaˈɾejɐ], transl. Sand Women) is a Brazilian telenovela produced by the TV Globo and aired between 1 February 1993 and 24 September 1993, in 203 episodes. It was written by Ivani Ribeiro with the contribution of Solange Castro Neves and directed by Wolf Maya, Ignácio Coqueiro, Andre Schultz and Carlos Magalhães. It is a remake of the soap opera of the same name that aired on the now-defunct Rede Tupi from 1973 to 1974, when Eva Wilma portrayed the two main characters of the plot (the twins Ruth and Raquel), which in turn is based on the 1965 radio soap opera As Noivas Morrem no Mar (The Brides Die at Sea). In 2023, it received a special re-airing in honor of its 30th anniversary.

== Plot ==
Young Marcos Assunção goes to the fictional city of Pontal D' Areia to assist in the businesses of the Assunção family. The young man meets Ruth, daughter of a poor fisherman, and falls in love with her, but he ends up involved with Raquel, the twin sister of Ruth. The sisters are identical, but of opposite personalities. While Ruth truly loves the young man, Raquel desires his position and riches. She also has a lover, Wanderley.

Tonho da Lua, best friend of Ruth, is mentally disturbed and famous for creating sculptures of women with the sand of the beach. Raquel must also face Virgílio Assunção, Marcos's father, who doesn't accept her relationship with his son. Virgílo, an unscrupulous man, is the vice-mayor and owner of the biggest hotel in the city. His goal is to turn Pontal D' Areia into a tourist center, but he must deal with the mayor of the city, the politician Breno. The population of the city is divided. Breno has one ally, Tônia, a local trader. To demoralize Breno, Virgílio puts scarecrows in the beaches, symbolizing the mayor.

Meanwhile, Ruth suffers in silence with the wedding of Marcos and Raquel. The plot has a twist when Raquel is believed dead in an accident at sea and Ruth assumes her identity to be with the man she loves. But Raquel did not die and she returns to claim her life.

== Cast ==
- Glória Pires - Ruth Araújo/Raquel Araújo Assunção
- Guilherme Fontes - Marcos Assunção
- Marcos Frota - Tonho da Lua
- Raul Cortez - Virgílio Assunção
- Suzana Vieira - Clara "Clarita" Assunção
- Laura Cardoso - Isaura Araújo
- Sebastião Vasconcelos - Floriano Araújo
- Vivianne Pasmanter - Maria Lúcia "Malu" Assunção
- Humberto Martins - Almeida Passos "Alaôr"
- Thaís de Campos - Arlete Assunção
- Adriano Reys - Oswaldo Sampaio
- Nicette Bruno - Julieta Sampaio (Juju)
- Andréa Beltrão - Tônia
- Carlos Zara - Zé Pedro
- Eloísa Mafalda - Manuela
- Alexandra Marzo - Carola Sampaio
- Irving São Paulo - Zé Luís
- Karina Perez - Andréa Sampaio
- Daniel Dantas - Breno Soares de Azevedo
- Isadora Ribeiro - Vera Soares de Azevedo
- Henri Pagnoncelli - Dr. César
- Jonas Bloch - Alemão
- Paulo Goulart - Donato; Villain
- Gabriela Alves - Glorinha
- Eduardo Moscovis - Tito
- Suely Franco - Celina de Almeida Passos
- Oscar Magrini - Vitor
- Fabrício Bittar - Reginho
- Paulo Betti - Wanderley Amaral
- Edwin Luisi - Dr. Munhoz
- Ricardo Blat - Marujo
- Evandro Mesquita - Joel
- João Carlos Barroso - Daniel
- Alexia Deschamps - Maria Helena
- Serafim Gonzalez - Garnizé
- Stepan Nercessian - Delegado Rodrigo
- Antônio Pompêo - Servílio
- Denise Milfont - Vilma
- Joel Barcellos - Chico Belo
- Lu Mendonça - Do Carmo
- Cibele Larrama - Luzia
- Marco Miranda - Duarte
- Marcelo Mansfield - Santiago
- Cleyde Blota - Hilda
- Kleber Drable - Padre João
- Leonardo Miranda - Jota
- Luciano Vianna - Tavinho
- Roney Villela - Carijó
- Toi Bressane - Rozendo
- Jorge Cherques - Abilio Vasquez

== Soundtrack ==
=== International Album 1993 ===
- Easy (Faith No More)
- Sweat (A La La La La Long) (Inner Circle)
- Bed of Roses (Bon Jovi)
- See the Light (Snap!)
- Let It Me Be (Ouriel)
- Close Encounters (Clouseau)
- Forever in Love (Kenny G)
- Bad Bad Boys (Midi, Maxi & Efti)
- Wild Thing (Tone Loc)
- Simple Life (Elton John)
- Looking at My Girl (Double You)
- No Ordinary Love (Sade)
- Latin Motion (Frank Shadon)
- Groovin' in the Midnight (Maxi Priest)
- The Colour of the Risk (Franco Perini)

=== National Album ===
- Ai ai ai ai ai (Ivan Lins)
- Pensando em minha amada (Chitãozinho & Xororó)
- Sexy Iemanjá (Pepeu Gomes) - Opening theme
- Encontro das águas (Maurício Mattar)
- Caminhos cruzados (Gal Costa)
- Ovelha negra (Os Fantasmas)
- Paraíso (Mariana Leporace)
- Down (T Set Squad)
- Toque de emoção (Joanna)
- A vida é festa (Banda Beijo)
- Desafios (Simone)
- Figura (Orlando Morais)
- Fantasia real (Biafra)
- Gita (Raul Seixas)
- Dirty game (Easy Rider)
- Voyager (Franco Perini)

== Awards ==
- APCA (1993): Best Actress - Glória Pires
- Troféu Imprensa (1993): Best Actress - Glória Pires

== Remake ==
- In 2014, TV Azteca announced the remake of the telenovela, under the name of Mujeres de arena, starring Gabriela Spanic, but it got cancelled.
