= André Gonçalves (actor) =

Brazilian actor (born 1975)

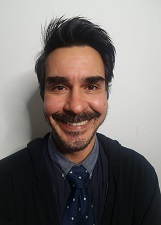
- Gonçalves in 2022
- Born: André Gonçalves Barbosa; 16 November 1975 (age 50); Rio de Janeiro, Brazil
- Occupation: Actor
- Years active: 1989–present
- Spouse: Myrian Rios (1999-2002) Cynthia Benini (2002-2006) Danielle Winits (2016-present)

André Gonçalves Barbosa (born 16 November 1975) is a Brazilian actor.

== Career ==
In 1989, Gonçalves made his television debut as Breno Gomes Batista in the mini-series Capitães de Areia, based on the book Captains of the Sands by Jorge Amado. After his debut, he worked in soap operas such as The Next Victim (1995), Senhora do Destino (2004), Alma Gêmea (2005), Paraíso Tropical (2007), Caminho das Índias (2009), Morde e Assopra (2011), Amor Eterno Amor (2012), Salve Jorge (2012) and Geração Brasil (2014).

In 2015, he was asked to play Etevaldo, a drummer who was looking for a relationship with Leonardo, a character by Klebber Toledo.

On 12 April 2018, Gonçalves was confirmed to play the role of Barrabás by RecordTV, for the series, Jesus.

== Personal life ==
In 1991, André began dating actress Carol Machado, with whom he starred in the soap opera, Vamp, staying together until 1994. Between 1994 and 1996 he dated actress Natália Lage.

In 1997, he had a brief relationship with actress Tereza Seiblitz, with whom he had a daughter.

In 1999 he began a relationship with Myrian Rios, with whom he starred in Era uma Vez.... After three months of dating, he went to live in her house, where she lived with her son. In 2000, the couple broke up for a few months, he had a brief romance with another woman, and that same year resumed his relationship with Rios. Their second child was born in Rio de Janeiro in 2001, and, in 2002, they ended the relationship amicably.

In 2001, Gonçalves suffered a psychotic outbreak on board a Varig flight between São Paulo and New York City, forcing the flight's pilots to make an emergency landing in Belém, Pará, where Gonçalves was taken by police to a medical facility for assistance.

In 2002, he started dating journalist Cynthia Benini, whom he met on the reality show Casa dos Artistas. They married on 27 September of that year. In 2003, the actor's third daughter was born. In 2006 the marriage came to an end.

Between 2009 and 2011 he dated the actress Letícia Sabatella, who he met on the soap opera Caminho das Índias.

In November 2021, he was arrested by the police for failing since 2007 to support his daughter, 18-year-old Valentina. In July 2022 another arrest warrant was issued by the State of Santa Catarina concerning a debt of 350 thousand reais (worth about US$66.000 at the time) in alimony due to his daughter Valentina. The actor paid his debt and was released after sixty days of house arrest.

On 3 January 2017, journalist Leo Dias reported in his column in the newspaper O Dia that Danielle Winits, Gonçalves's wife, lied when she said she was pregnant and that she received priority care to board a flight to New York.

Gonçalves posted a video on social media in which he said:

Hello, Leo Dias. Let me tell you something since you don't respect anyone. Since you lie and make up a lot of lies... Here's something: there's no process, I'm going to break your teeth, my son!" [...]

—

On 11 January, Winits filed a complaint against Dias at the 14th Police Station in Leblon, Rio de Janeiro. Dias also filed a complaint against Gonçalves for insult and threat.

The first hearing in the suit against Gonçalves was held on 27 March of the same year in Barra da Tijuca, Rio de Janeiro, but Dias did not attend. Later, Dias announced on his show Gossiping that the case had been resolved.

== Filmography ==
=== Television ===
| Year | Title | Role | Notes |
|---|---|---|---|
| 1989 | Capitães de Areia | Breno Gomes Batista | |
| 1991 | Ilha das Bruxas | Antônio Carlos Soares | |
| 1991 | Vamp | Matosinho | |
| 1993 | Fera Ferida | Vivaldo Fronteira | |
| 1995 | A Próxima Vítima | Sandro Carvalho Rossi | |
| 1996 | Salsa & Merengue | Walter Ramos | |
| 1997 | Malhação | Merreca | |
| 1998 | Era uma Vez... | Júlio Santana Mello | |
| 1998 | Mulher | Marcelo | Episode: "Jogos Proibidos" |
| 2000 | A Muralha | Apingorá | |
| 2001 | Sai de Baixo | Eros | Episode: "Afrodite Se Quiser" |
| 2001 | Brava Gente | Bibi | Episode: "Os Mistérios do Sexo" |
| 2002 | Casa dos Artistas 2 | Participant | Temporada 2 |
| 2004 | Senhora do Destino | Venâncio Ferreira da Silva | |
| 2005 | Sítio do Picapau Amarelo | Pequeno Polegar | Episode: "13 de maio–17 de junho" |
| 2005 | Alma Gêmea | José Aristides | |
| 2006 | Linha Direta | Bandido da Luz Vermelha | Episode: "O Bandido da Luz Vermelha" |
| 2006 | Dança no Gelo | Participant | Temporada 2 |
| 2007 | Amazônia, de Galvez a Chico Mendes | Zuca | |
| 2007 | Toma Lá, Dá Cá | Taluã | Episode: "Atrás do Trio Elétrico" |
| 2007 | Paraíso Tropical | Almir | Episode: "24 de agosto–26 de seetmbro" |
| 2008 | Dicas de um Sedutor | Gláuber | Episode: "Falta Homem" |
| 2008 | Casos e Acasos | Gerson | Episode: "O Diagnóstico, o Fetiche e a Bebida" |
| 2008 | Faça Sua História | Leleco | Episode: "A Herança de Napoleão" |
| 2009 | Caminho das Índias | Gopal | |
| 2010 | Escrito nas Estrelas | Jair Pereira | |
| 2010 | As Cariocas | Abelardo | Episode: "A Internauta da Mangueira" |
| 2010 | Diversão &amp; Cia | Tales Araújo | Special for the end of the year |
| 2011 | Morde & Assopra | Áureo Alves Junqueira | |
| 2012 | Amor Eterno Amor | Pedro Fonseca | |
| 2012 | Cheias de Charme | Apresentador do festival | Episode: "2 de julho" |
| 2012 | Salve Jorge | Miro | |
| 2013 | Didi, o Peregrino | Agiota | Special for the end of the year |
| 2014 | Por Isso Eu Sou Vingativa | Rivonaldo Carneiro Godói (Rildo) | |
| 2014 | Geração Brasil | Mário Aparecido dos Santos (Cidão) | |
| 2015 | Império | Etevaldo (Duque) | Episodes: "23 de janeiro–10 de março" |
| 2015 | Tomara que Caia | Vários personagens | Episode: "27 de setembro" |
| 2015–16 | Malhação: Seu Lugar no Mundo | Nilton Chagas | |
| 2016 | Super Chef Celebridades | Participante (3.º lugar) | |
| 2018 | Brasil a Bordo | Ele mesmo | Episode: "22 de janeiro" |
| 2018 | Jesus | Barrabás | |
| 2018 | Impuros | Salvador | |
| 2020 | Dança dos Famosos | Participante | |

=== Films ===
| Year | Title | Role | Notes |
|---|---|---|---|
| 1999 | No Coração dos Deuses | José Dias | |
| 2001 | Condenado à Liberdade | Maurinho Vilhena | |
| 2003 | O Homem do Ano | Galego | |
| 2004 | Cazuza - O Tempo Não Para | Maneco | |
| 2004 | Garrincha - Estrela Solitária | Garrincha | |
| 2014 | Os Maias | Castro Gomes | |
| 2018 | Nada a Perder | R. R. Soares | |
| 2019 | Nada a Perder - parte 2 | R. R. Soares | |

== Awards/Nominations ==
| Year | Award | Category | Nomination | Result |
|---|---|---|---|---|
| 2011 | Prêmio Extra de TV | Melhor Ator Coadjuvante | Áureo em Morde & Assopra | Won |
