= O Salvador da Pátria =

- Genre: Telenovela
- Created by: Lauro César Muniz
- Directed by: Gonzaga Blota
- Starring: Lima Duarte; Maitê Proença; José Wilker; Betty Faria; Francisco Cuoco; Susana Vieira; Lúcia Veríssimo; Lucinha Lins; Cecil Thiré; Mário Lago; Mayara Magri; Thales Pan Chacon; Antônio Calloni; Gracindo Júnior; Maurício Mattar; Narjara Turetta
- Opening theme: "Amarra o Teu Arado a Uma Estrela" by Gilberto Gil
- Country of origin: Brazil
- Original language: Portuguese
- No. of episodes: 186

Production
- Running time: 50 minutes

Original release
- Network: TV Globo
- Release: 9 January – 12 August 1989

Related
- Vale Tudo; Tieta

O Salvador da Pátria (The Savior of the Homeland in English) is a Brazilian telenovela produced and broadcast by TV Globo. It premiered on 9 January and ended on 12 August 1989, with a total of 186 episodes. It's the fortieth "novela das oito" to be aired on the timeslot. It is created by Lauro César Muniz and directed by Gonzaga Blota.

== Plot ==
Conservative federal deputy Severo Toledo Blanco, the most powerful man in the Ouro Verde region, chooses the naive, simple-minded and illiterate working-class Salvador da Silva, or Sassá Mutema, to marry his mistress Marlene, in an attempt to divert attention from his adultery. The story reaches Juca Pirama, an unscrupulous radio host who demagogically exploits the episode on his radio show.

Soon, a double murder victimizes Marlene and Juca Pirama, with Sassá Mutema as the main suspect - the supposedly betrayed husband who has washed his honor in blood. The hard-working matuto is even arrested, but his innocence is proven with the support of the people and the beautiful teacher Clotilde, who is touched by his situation. It turns out that the moralistic Juca Pirama was actually corrupt and linked to drug trafficking.

Sassá gains popularity and becomes the target of attention from local politicians, who want to manipulate him into becoming mayor of the small town of Tangará. Supported by influential people, Sassá comes to power, but rebels and conquers his own political position, dreaming of a career in Brasilia. Along the way, he counts on the friendship of Clotilde, with whom he falls in love and ends up having an affair.

Meanwhile, a police and political intrigue ensues involving Congressman Severo Blanco, through Gilda, his personable wife, who does everything she can to maintain the failed marriage; Marina Sintra, a wealthy landowner who is his political opponent; and Bárbara Souza Telles, the granddaughter of the region's biggest banker, with whom the Congressman is having a secret affair and who, it turns out, runs the drug trafficking organization.

There is also the plot of the pilot João Matos, who, involved by his brother Juca Pirama, is unjustly accused of drug trafficking. In fact, he has been used as a scapegoat. To escape the police, João assumes another identity: Miro Ferraz. With his marriage to Ângela in crisis, he ends up having an affair with Marina Sintra, while fighting to prove his innocence and take down the criminal organization of which he was a victim.

== Cast ==
Actor	Character
Lima Duarte	Sassá Mutema (Salvador da Silva)
Maitê Proença	Clotilde Ribeiro
Francisco Cuoco	Severo Toledo Blanco
Betty Faria	Marina Campos Sintra
José Wilker	João Matos/Miro Ferraz
Lúcia Veríssimo	Bárbara Souza Telles
Thales Pan Chacon	Cássio Marins
Lucinha Lins	Ângela Mendes Matos
Susana Vieira	Gilda Pompeu de Toledo Blanco
Mayara Magri	Camila Sintra
Flávio Migliaccio	Nilo Assunção
Mário Lago	Joaquim Xavier (Quinzote)
Cecil Thiré	Mauro Brancatto
Marcos Paulo	Paulo Silveira
Gracindo Júnior	Ricardo Ribeiro
Luís Gustavo	Juca Pirama (José Matos Filho)
Tássia Camargo	Marlene Machado da Silva
Tony Vermont	Miguel
Cláudio Corrêa e Castro	"Barão" de Guaratinguetá (Frederico Martinez)
Luiz Armando Queiroz	Francisco
Ângela Leal	Giuliana
Gilberto Martinho	Fernando Gaspar
Clementino Kelé	Márcio
Nádia Lippi	Helena
Rogério Fróes	Gilberto
Eduardo Tornaghi	Jeffrey Thomásio
Narjara Turetta	Rafaela Toledo Blanco
João Carlos Barroso	Fidélis
Luthero Luiz	José da Silva (Bodão)
Ivan Cândido	Zenóbio Reis (Zen)
Benjamin Cattan	Hermínio Souza Telles
Tácito Rocha	Gil Eanes
Antônio Grassi	Delegado Plínio Kohl
Antonio Calloni	Tomaz Siqueira
Maurício Mattar	Sérgio Pompeu de Toledo Blanco
Suzy Rêgo	Alice Sintra
Marco Miranda	Ciro
Alexandra Marzo	Sílvia Toledo Blanco
José Augusto Branco	Padre Alberto Jardim
Nelson Dantas	Décio de Abreu
Norma Geraldy	Noêmia
Eduardo Galvão	Régis de Abreu
Cláudio Curi	Sidney
Aldine Müller	Dinah Amaral / Aída
Waldyr Sant'anna	Neco Carranca (Manuel da Cunha)
Natália Lage	Regina Matos
Valter Santos	Jaime
Solange Theodoro	Daniela
Chico Expedito	Waldemar
Marcela Muniz	Zezé (Maria José)
Hugo Gross	Brás Vasconcelos (Brasito)
George Otto	Roberto Amaral
Luiz Maçãs	Marco Antônio
Andréa Richa	Cristina
Alexandre Akerman	Dirceu Barreto
Cláudio Cavalcanti	Eduardo Correia

=== Special appearances ===
Intérprete	Personagem
Luis Gustavo	José Matos Filho (Juca Pirama)
Tássia Camargo	Marlene Machado da Silva
Paulo César Pereio	Sebastião Machado (Tião)
Walmor Chagas	Bispo Dom Arlindo Soares de Moura
Thelma Reston	Aparecida (Cida Capivara)
Gilberto Martinho	Fernando Gaspar
Reynaldo Gonzaga	Bento Crispim
Brandão Filho	Padre Elísio
Germano Filho	Pastor Mendes
Ibanez Filho	Manoel Gitano
Tarcísio Filho	Otávio (Garotão)
Breno Bonin	Dr. Miranda
Leonardo José	Dr. Meirelles
Jean-Paul Rajzman	Jacques Etiénne
Kauê Kajally	Nivaldo
Flávio São Thiago	Bené
Hemílcio Fróes	Jorge
Myrian Pérsia	Graça
Christiana Guinle	Leda
Nancy Galvão	Vânia
Kiki Lavigne	Marlene
Tereza Briggs	Tereza
André Ceccato	funcionário de Severo
Fábio Mássimo	médico que examina Sassá
Freddy Monteiro	operador de áudio da Rádio Clube
Jimy Raw	funcionário da Rádio Clube
Lila Hamdan	secretária da Rádio Clube
Lia Farrel	vizinha de João e Ângela
Aguinaldo Rocha	escrivão da delegacia de Tangará
Gonzaga Blota	médico da colônia penal agrícola
Mira Palheta	testemunha da morte de Juca Pirama e Marlene
Leonardo Franco	repórter no debate entre os candidatos
Paulo Figueiredo	presidente da Câmara de Tangará
Bia Junqueira	repórter da TV Ouro Verde
Orion Ximenes	líder dos capangas de Sassá
Yan Zeller	cliente no bar de Cida Capivara
Alciro Cunha	policial da fronteira entre Brasil e Bolívia
Francisco Dantas	pai de Maria Aparecida
Silvio Pozatto	repórter da revista Fala Brasil
Francisco Milani	apresentador do Mundial Repórter
Guto Sinval	diretor da TV Mundial
Dominguinhos	himself
Glorinha Beuttenmüller	herself
Chitãozinho	himself
Xororó	himself
Hortência Marcari	herself
José Victor Oliva	himself
Pelé	himself

== Production ==
To construct part of the plot of O Salvador da Pátria, Lauro César Muniz, at the suggestion of Daniel Filho, a producer at TV Globo, based himself on O Crime do Zé Bigorna, a story he had made for the network to show in the special cases slot in 1974 and which gave rise to the film of the same name in 1977, directed by Anselmo Duarte. The character Zé Bigorna spawned Sassá Mutema, the protagonist of the telenovela; both were played by Lima Duarte.

The synopsis originally proposed that Sassá, an illiterate working class man, should become president of Brazil. However, under pressure from political groups in the midst of the 1989 presidential election, the first after two decades under military dictatorship, Globo ordered the story to be changed, with the character becoming vice-president and then mayor. The ideological camps of the two main candidates saw the soap opera as a way of promoting one over the other - the right, linked to Fernando Collor de Mello, believed that the protagonist favored Luiz Inácio Lula da Silva, of the left, while the latter considered him a stereotype of the presidential candidate. Thus, Muniz redirected the approach of the novel from political to police themes, involving a drug trafficking organization that would ultimately be denounced by Sassá.

When he reached the final stretch of the soap opera, Muniz took a break from his work due to health problems and commissioned collaborator Alcides Nogueira, with the help of Carlos Lombardi and Ana Maria Moretzsohn, to write the last chapters of the plot. The ending was left to be decided by the author.

The intro for O Salvador da Pátria, developed by Hans Donner's team, was based on five paintings depicting the political evolution of Sassá Mutema. To do this, realistic panels were painted in the studios and scene elements were projected onto them. With the song Amarra o Teu Arado a Uma Estrela, by Gilberto Gil, actor Breno Moroni, in the character of Sassá Mutema, walked through the paintings, simulating going through all the stages of the character's life.

== Reception ==
The show recorded an average viewership rating of 63 points, one of Brazil's top rated telenovelas of all time.
