= Em Família (TV series) =

- Promotional poster to promote the premiere of the telenovela.
- Also known as: Helena's Shadow
- Genre: Drama
- Created by: Manoel Carlos
- Directed by: Jayme Monjardim; Leonardo Nogueira
- Theme music composer: Vinícius de Moraes and Tom Jobim
- Opening theme: "Eu Sei Que Vou Te Amar" by Ana Carolina
- Country of origin: Brazil
- Original language: Portuguese
- No. of episodes: 143; 75 (International Version)

Production
- Production location: Brazil
- Camera setup: Multiple-camera setup
- Running time: 70 minutes

Original release
- Network: TV Globo
- Release: 3 February – 18 July 2014

Related
- Amor à Vida; Império

Em Família (In the Family; official title Helena's Shadow) is a Brazilian primetime telenovela created by Manoel Carlos and produced and broadcast by TV Globo. It premiered on 3 February 2014, replacing Amor à Vida and ended 18 July 2014, replaced by Império.

Julia Lemmertz, Bruna Marquezine and Humberto Martins star as the protagonists, while Vivianne Pasmanter and Gabriel Braga Nunes star as the antagonists.

According to Ibope, the average was 29.63 (30) points - the lowest rated 9PM telenovela of all time.

== Plot ==
Tells the story of two cousins, Helena (Julia Lemmertz) and Laerte (Gabriel Braga Nunes), who grow up united by two strong ties: family and love. Laerte is a musician who is in love with his cousin, but consumed by an obsessive jealousy, especially of his friend Virgílio (Humberto Martins), who has always fostered a platonic love for Helena. Helena herself has a strong personality and has never accepted the possessive side of her problematic boyfriend, although she keeps teasing him.

On the night before his marriage to Helena, Laerte argues with Virgílio and strikes him across the face. Taking his rival for dead, Laerte quickly buries the body to hide the evidence. But Virgílio survived the blow and Laerte is taken prisoner at the altar. After he serves his sentence of one year, Laerte moves to Europe and loses contact with the woman who was almost his wife.

Twenty years after the tragedy that tore him away from his cousin, Laerte, now a successful musician, sees a young girl in the audience at one of his concerts, who looks just like his long lost love. It is Luiza (Bruna Marquezine), the daughter of Helena, and Laerte’s rival, Virgílio, who still bears the scar on his face and on his soul from that fateful day.

Back in Brazil, Laerte sees Luiza again and, to Helena’s deep despair, becomes romantically involved with her. She is now married to Virgílio and she sees history repeat itself with her daughter’s love affair. Dormant feelings resurface and affect both her marriage and her relationship with her daughter. Defying everyone, Laerte and Luiza decide to stay together—a decision that causes conflict and turmoil all around them.

== Cast ==
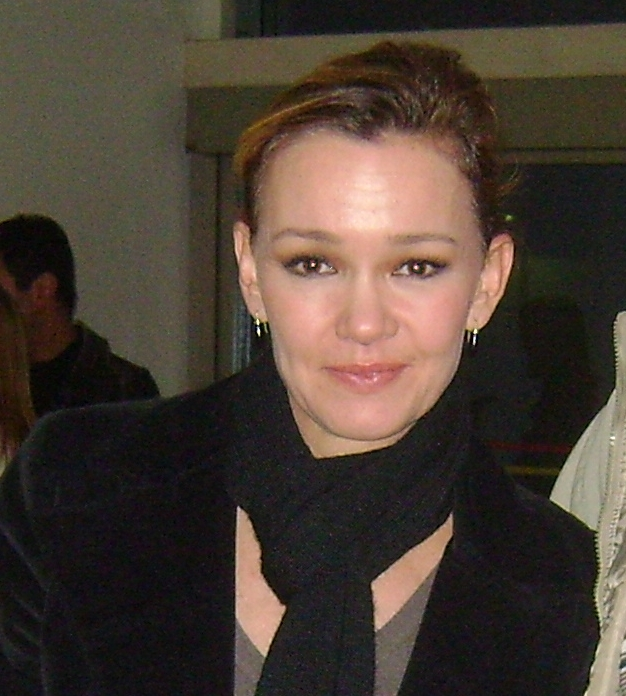
Júlia Lemmertz as Helena.

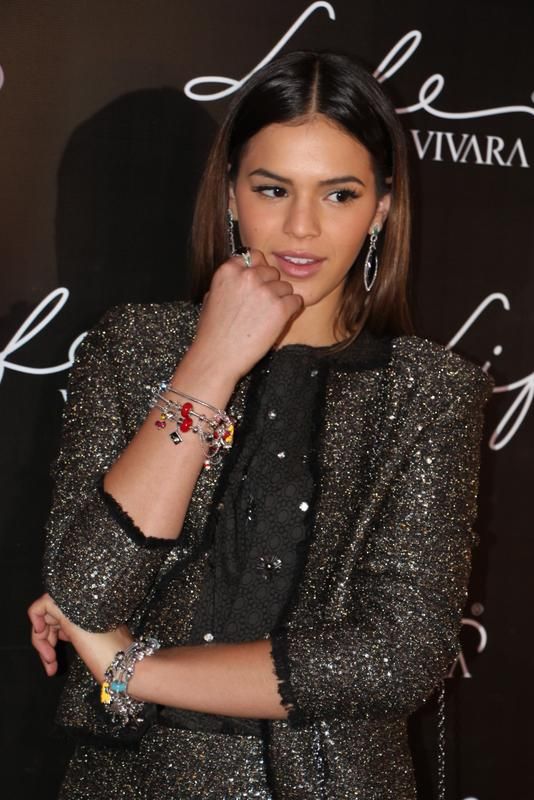
Bruna Marquezine as Helena / Luiza.

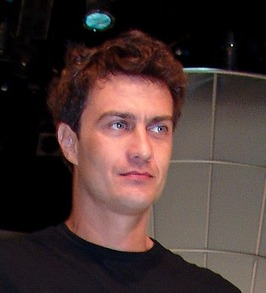
Gabriel Braga Nunes as Laerte.

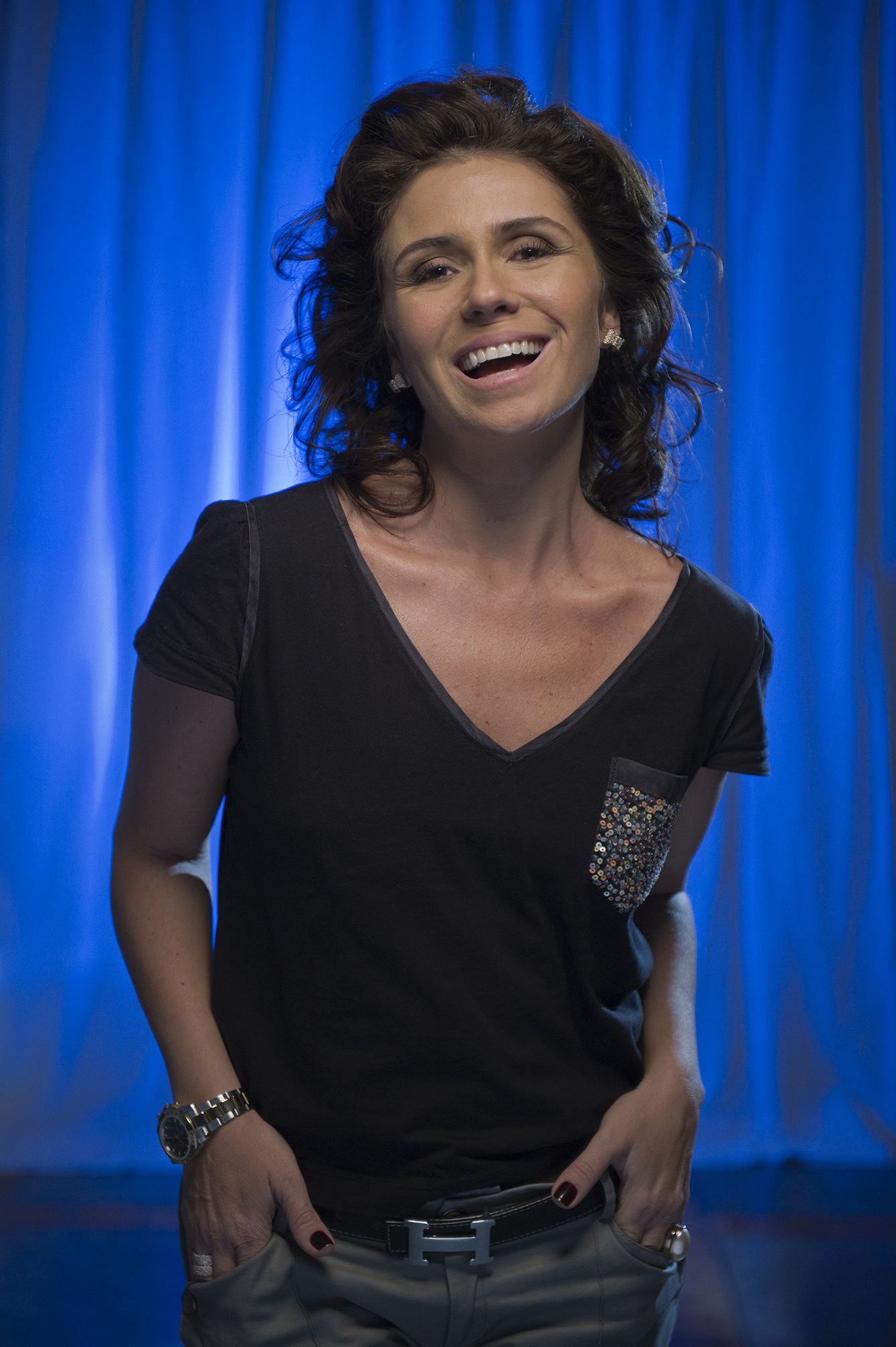
Giovanna Antonelli as Clara.

Actor/Actress	Role	Phase
Júlia Lemmertz	Helena Fernandes Machado	3rd
Bruna Marquezine	Helena Fernandes Machado	2nd
Julia Dalavia	Helena Fernandes Machado	1st
Gabriel Braga Nunes	Laerte Fernandes	3rd
Guilherme Leicam	Laerte Fernandes	2nd
Eike Duarte	Laerte Fernandes	1st
Humberto Martins	Virgilio Machado	3rd
Nando Rodrigues	Virgilio Machado	2nd
Arthur Aguiar	Virgilio Machado	1st
Vivianne Pasmanter	Shirley Soares	3rd
Alice Wegmann	Shirley Soares	2nd
Giovanna Rispoli	Shirley Soares	1st
Bruna Marquezine	Luiza Fernandes Machado	3rd
Natália do Vale	Francisca Fernandes (Chica)	3rd
Juliana Araripe	Francisca Fernandes (Chica)	1st and 2nd
Giovanna Antonelli	Clara Fernandes de Santos	3rd
Karize Brum	Clara Fernandes de Santos	2nd
Luana Marquezine	Clara Fernandes de Santos	1st
Vanessa Gerbelli	Juliana Proença	3rd
Gabriela Carneiro da Cunha	Juliana Proença	1st and 2nd
Ana Beatriz Nogueira	Selma Proença Fernandes	3rd
Camila Raffanti	Selma Proença Fernandes	1st and 2nd
Reynaldo Gianecchini	Carlos Eduardo (Cadu)	
Helena Ranaldi	Veronica	
Herson Capri	Ricardo	
Bianca Rinaldi	Silvia	
Paulo José	Benjamim Machado	
Ângela Vieira	Branca	
Bruno Gissoni	Andre Machado	
Oscar Magrini	Ramiro Fernandes	
Thiago Mendonça	Felipe Fernandes	3rd
Guilherme Prates	Felipe Fernandes	2nd
Vinni Mazzola	Felipe Fernandes	1st
Leonardo Medeiros	Fernando Nando	
Tainá Müller	Marina Meirelles	
Miguel Thiré	Gabriel	
Betty Gofman	Miss Lauren	
Maria Eduarda de Carvalho	Vanessa	
Nelson Baskerville	Itamar Fernandes	
Poliana Aleixo	Barbara Soares Fernandes	
Ronny Kriwat	Leto Soares Fernandes	
Manu Gavassi	Paula	
Cláudia Assunção	Mafalda Soares	
Monique Curi	Telma	
Rafael Tombini	Leandro	
Carla Cristina	Neidinha Machado	
Erika Januza	Alice Machado	
Sacha Bali	Murilo	
Marcello Melo Jr.	Jairo Machado	
Antônio Petrin	Viriato Soares	
Roberta Almeida	Sandra	
Silvia Quadros	Isolda	
Claudia Mauro	Ana	3rd
Camilla Camargo	Ana	2nd
Lica Oliveira	Dulce	
Agatha Moreira	Gisele	
Wilson Rabelo	Batista	
Carol Macedo	Gorete	
Jéssika Alves	Guiomar	
Maria Pompeu	Amelia	
Tânia Toko	Rosa	
Ju Colombo	Ceiça	
Vitor Figueiredo	Ivan	
Luiza Moraes	Flavinha	
Nicole Evangeline	Lais	
Cyria Coentro	Maria	
Rafael Zulu	Luis	
Henrique Schafer	Viriato	

== Ratings ==
Timeslot	Episodes	Premiere		Finale		Rank	Season	Rating average
Timeslot	Episodes	Date	Viewers (in points)	Date	Viewers (in points)	Rank	Season	Rating average
Mondays—Saturdays; 9:15pm	143	3 February 2014	35	18 July 2014	37	#1	2014–15	29.63

== Awards and nominations ==
Year	Award	Category	Nominated	Result
2014	Prêmio Contigo! de TV	Best Telenovela of the Year	Manoel Carlos	Nominated
2014	Prêmio Contigo! de TV	Best Actress	Bruna Marquezine	Nominated
2014	Prêmio Contigo! de TV	Best Supporting Actor	Reynaldo Gianecchini	Nominated
2014	Prêmio Contigo! de TV	Best Supporting Actress	Giovanna Antonelli	Nominated
2014	Prêmio Contigo! de TV	Best Supporting Actress	Tainá Müller	Nominated
2014	Prêmio Contigo! de TV	Best Child Actor	Vitor Figueiredo	Nominated
2014	Prêmio Contigo! de TV	Best Author	Manoel Carlos	Nominated
2014	Prêmio Contigo! de TV	Best Director	Jayme Monjardim and Leonardo Nogueira	Nominated

== International Broadcasting ==
Globo distributed Em Família for 3 countries to date, with 75 chapters - almost half the original.

Exibição pelo mundo
Country	Channel	Title Location	Premiere	End	Weekly Schedule	Hour	Ref
Brazil	TV Globo	Em Família	3 February 2014	18 July 2014	Monday to Saturday	21:15	—N/a
São Tomé and Príncipe	TVS	Em Família	10 February 2014	25 July 2014	Monday to Saturday	21:15	—N/a
Portugal	SIC	Em Família	31 March 2014	21 November 2014	Monday to Saturday	18:45	
Mexico	Azteca Uno	La Sombra de Helena	TBA				
Costa Rica	Teletica	La Sombra de Helena	TBA				

Preceded by Amor à Vida (2013)	Em Família; 3 February 2014 – 18 July 2014	Succeeded by Império
