= Marcos Frota =

Brazilian actor and businessman

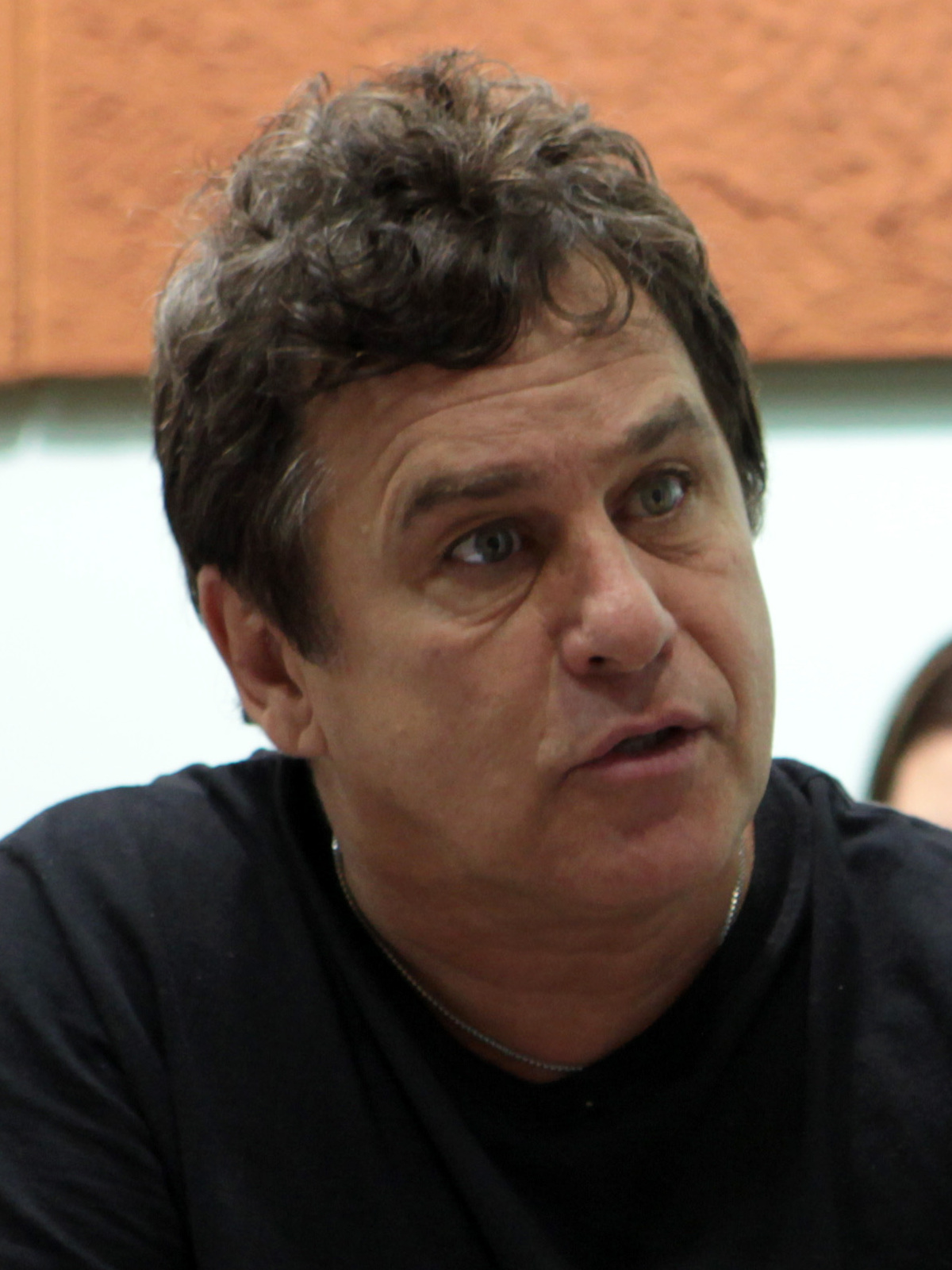
- Frota in 2017
- Born: Marcos Magano Frota; September 29, 1956 (age 69); Guaxupé, Minas Gerais, Brazil
- Occupations: actor, trapeze artist, businessman

Marcos Magano Frota (born September 29, 1956) is a Brazilian actor, trapeze artist and businessman. With a vast career in theater, television, cinema, and later in the circus, he became known for roles in telenovelas on Rede Globo, such as Vereda Tropical (1984), Mulheres de Areia (1993), A Próxima Vítima (1995), O Clone (2001) and América (2005).

== Personal life ==
Between 1976 and 1993 he was married to businesswoman Cibele Ferreira, who died in 1993 in an accident. With his first wife he had three children: Amaralina, born in 1979, Apoena, born in 1981, and Tainã, born in 1989. In 1996 he started dating actress Carolina Dieckmann, with whom he was married between 1997 and 2003 and had a son named Davi, born in 1999. He is an associate of the Humanos Direitos Movement.

== Filmography ==
=== Cinema ===
Year	Title	Role	Notes
1985	Tropclip	Emiliano	
1985	Os Bons Tempos Voltaram: Vamos Gozar Outra Vez	Edinho	
1988	Banana Split	Ted	
1993	Vagas para Moças de Fino Trato	Alfredo	
2000	Xuxa Popstar	JP	
2012	Madagascar 3: Os Procurados	Stefano (voz)	Dublagem
2013	Orlando Orfei, O Homem do Circo Vivo	Ele mesmo	Documentário
2017	Os Saltimbancos Trapalhões: Rumo a Hollywood	Assis Satã	
2018	O Grande Circo Místico	Oswaldão	

=== Television ===
Year	Title	Role	Notes
1976	O Julgamento	Fernando	
1976	Escrava Isaura	Eurípedes	
1977	Nina	David	
1979	Malu Mulher	Esdras	Episódio: "O Silêncio de Deus"
1979	Carga Pesada	Justo	Episódio: "A Procura"
1982	Elas por Elas	Otávio	
1983	Fernando da Gata	Juan Ramirez	
1984	Anarquistas, Graças a Deus	Remo Gattai	
1984	Caso Verdade	Tony / Teodoro	Episódio: "Esperança"; Episódio: "Os Gêmeos"
1984	Vereda Tropical	Teófilo de Oliva Salgado (Teozinho)	
1986	Cambalacho	Ricardo Pereira Romano (Rick)	
1987	O Outro	Pedro Ernesto Della Santa	
1987	Sassaricando	Carlos Alberto Bacellar (Beto)	
1989	O Sexo dos Anjos	Tomás Muniz	
1990	Mico Preto	Astor Pinheiro	
1991	Vamp	Augusto Sérgio Frost	
1993	Mulheres de Areia	Tonho da Lua	
1994	Você Decide	Dr. Virgílio	Episódio: "O louco"
1994	Você Decide	Mariano	Episódio: "A expulsão do paraíso"
1995	A Próxima Vítima	Diego Bueno	
1996	Malhação de Verão	Hugo	
1996	Malhação 1996	Hugo	Temporada 2
1997	A Indomada	Artêmio Taylor	
1998	Hilda Furacão	Padre Geraldo	
1998	Era uma Vez...	Horácio Zanella	
2000	Aquarela do Brasil	Casaca	Episódio: "22 de agosto"
2000	Uga Uga	Nikolaos Karabastos Júnior (Nikos)	Episódio: "8 de maio"
2001	O Clone	Dr. Danilo Escobar (Escobar)	
2003	Chocolate com Pimenta	Morcego Voador	Episódios: "3–5 de dezembro"
2005	América	Pedro Jatobá (Jatobá)	
2008	Casos e Acasos	Evandro / César / Alberto	Episódio: "O Flagra. a Demissão e a Adoção"; Episódio: "O Carro, o E-mail e o Rapper"; Episódio: "O Ultimato, o Vândalo e a Pensão"
2008	Faça Sua História	Passageiro	Episódio: "Corrida Noturna"
2010	Ti Ti Ti	Joel Massa (Massa)	
2011	Aventuras do Didi	Amaral	Episódio: "10 de julho"
2015	Malhação: Seu Lugar no Mundo	Menelau Mello	Episódio: "17 de agosto–18 de setembro"
2015	Malhação: Os Desatinados	Menelau Mello	Obra derivada de Malhação: Seu Lugar no Mundo
2016	Tá no Ar: A TV na TV	Tonho de Luca	Episódio: "17 de fevereiro"
2016	Sol Nascente	Beto Marambaia	Episódios: "9–11 de novembro"
