= Vídeo Show =

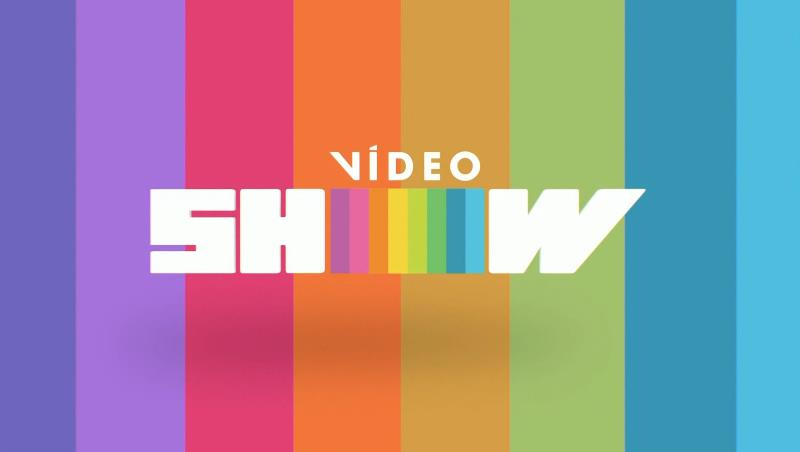
- Genre: Variety show Newsmagazine
- Directed by: Kizzy Magalhães
- Presented by: Joaquim Lopes; Sophia Abrahão
- Theme music composer: Maynard Ferguson
- Opening theme: Based on "Don't Stop 'Til You Get Enough" by Michael Jackson
- Country of origin: Brazil
- Original language: Portuguese
- No. of seasons: 45
- No. of episodes: 7366

Production
- Running time: 50–80 minutes
- Production company: Estúdios Globo

Original release
- Network: Rede Globo
- Release: 20 March 1983 – 11 January 2019

Vídeo Show was a long-running Brazilian television program on Rede Globo that aired from 20 March 1983 to 11 January 2019. From its debut in 1983 to 1994, the show aired weekly. From 1994 to 2019, it aired from Monday to Friday at 2 p.m. Brasilia Time following Jornal Hoje and was one of the network's most-watched afternoon shows.

On 8 January 2019, Rede Globo announced the program's cancellation due to declining viewership; the show's final episode aired three days later.

== Format ==
This format was that of a daily "electronic magazine", where the network's backstages are shown, with on-set and behind-the-scenes footage on Globo's series and telenovelas, including bloopers, interviews with the actors, actresses, directors and authors, funny segments with scenes from the telenovelas, and old videos from the network's archives through Memoria Globo. Vídeo Show relaunched as a hybrid game show/variety show on 18 November 2013 with the debut of Zeca Camargo (former host of Fantástico) and Ricardo Waddington. However, in conjunction of Globo's 50th anniversary, Vídeo Show reverted to its original format and the studio audience was removed. This relaunch marked the return of Miguel Falabella (the longest-serving presenter; 1987–2002), as one of the hosts and Cissa Guimarães, the show's reporter. Otaviano Costa became a permanent host and Monica Iozzi became Costa's co-host, replacing Zeca Camargo.

The show's final presenters were Joaquim Lopes and Sophia Abrahão. Initially, it was presented by Tássia Camargo in its inception, years later by Marcelo Tas (current member of CQC Brazil), the actors Miguel Falabella, André Marques, the host Angélica, Fernanda Lima and Ana Furtado. Otaviano Costa, Marcela Monteiro and Dani Monteiro later served as presenters. This version presented a summary of current views and ancient views on TV.

From 2001 to 2011, there was a "Vídeo Game" segment, consisting of a week-long game show hosted by Angélica, where actors, divided into two teams, must answer questions and complete funny tasks related to the network's current and/or past shows. The winner was announced on Friday, and donated the prize to a charity of their choice.

The opening theme was based on "Don't Stop 'Til You Get Enough" by Michael Jackson; an instrumental version of the song composed by Maynard Ferguson was used for most of the show's run.

== Vídeo Show Walk of Fame ==
"Vídeo Show Walk of Fame" was a segment where artists were invited to make their mark in a block of cement, following the same modes of ceremonies of TCL Chinese Theatre.

Each concrete block was to be part of a future Hall of Fame at the studios of Globo (Estúdios Globo) in Rio de Janeiro.
