= Elias Gleizer =

Brazilian comedian and actor

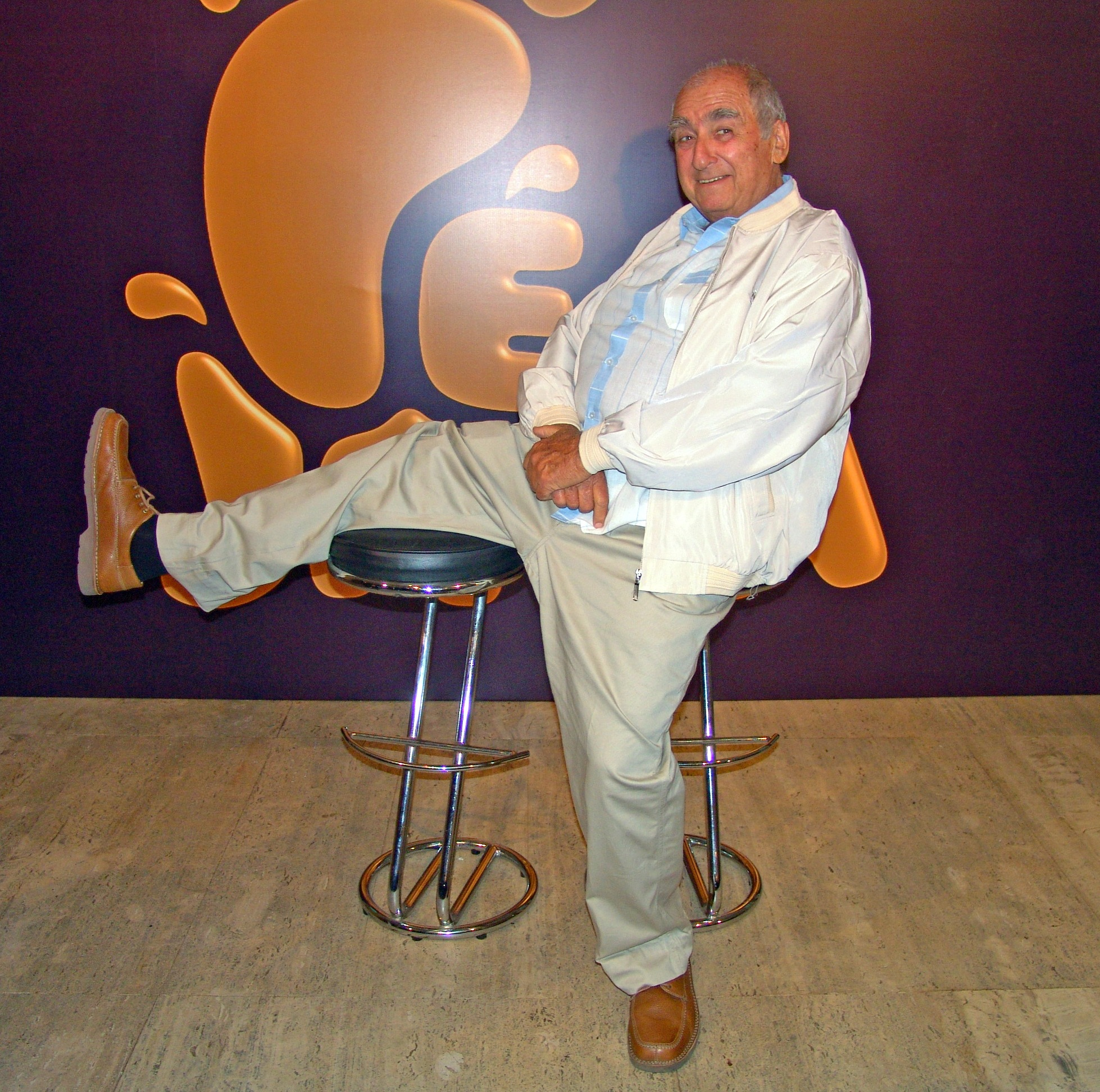
- Elias Gleizer in 2006.
- Born: Ilicz Glejzer; 4 January 1934; São Paulo, Brazil
- Died: 16 May 2015 (aged 81); Rio de Janeiro, Brazil
- Occupation: Actor
- Years active: 1959-2014

Ilicz Glejzer (4 January 1934 – 16 May 2015), better known as Elias Gleizer, was a Brazilian comedian and actor.

Born in São Paulo, Gleizer was the son of two Polish Jewish immigrants, a shoemaker and a housewife. He began his artistic career at age 12, playing the violin in a youth orchestra. In 1956 he won the award for best actor in an amateur festival, and in 1959 he made his television debut on TV Tupi. His first major work was Joseph of Egypt, a 1964 telenovela. In 1984 he started an intense collaboration with the Rede Globo, acting in Free to Fly, and then appearing in dozens of telenovelas and miniseries.

== Filmography ==
Year	Title	Role	Notes
1965	Quatro Brasileiros em Paris	Policial	
1971	Diabólicos Herdeiros		
1980	O Meu Pé de Laranja Lima	Padre Rosendo	TV series
1988	Fera Radical	Donato Orsini	
1989	Tieta	Jairo	
1992	Pedra sobre Pedra		TV series
1992-1993	Despedida de Solteiro	Vitório	203 episodes
1993-1994	Sonho Meu	Zé	
1999	Terra Nostra	Padre Olavo	TV series
2000	Uga-Uga	Ceguinho	TV series
2002	Sítio do Picapau Amarelo	Rei Euristeus	TV series
2003	Sítio do Picapau Amarelo	Berloque	TV series
2004	Didi Quer Ser Criança	Seu Tião	
2006-2007	Pé na Jaca	Giácomo	159 episodes
2009	Divã	Agenor	
2009	Caminho das Índias	Cadore	95 episodes
2010-2011	Passione	Diógenes Santarém	68 episodes
2013	Flor do Caribe	Manolo Gutierrez	TV series
2014	Boogie Oogie	Padre Claudius	TV series, (final appearance)
