= Você Decide =

Brazilian television program

- Genre: Interactivity
- Created by: Boni
- Directed by: Paulo José; Roberto Talma; Herval Rossano; Fábio Sabag; Guel Arraes; André Schultz; Mario Márcio Bandarra; Luís Antônio Piá; Paulo Silvestrini
- Starring: Various
- Opening theme: Instrumental
- Ending theme: Instrumental
- Country of origin: Brazil
- Original language: Portuguese
- No. of seasons: 10
- No. of episodes: 323

Production
- Producer: Various
- Running time: 45 mins (inc. adverts)
- Production company: Estúdios Globo

Original release
- Network: TV Globo
- Release: 8 April 1992 – 17 August 2000
- Release: 21 June 2026 – present

Você Decide (You Decide / It's Your Call) is an interactive television program broadcast on the Brazilian TV network TV Globo from 1992 to 2000. During each episode special cases were presented, and viewers would decide the ending through phone votes.

In 2026 the new segments programs from Domingão com Huck and the new format digital viewers through internet votes.

== Broadcast history ==
Você Decide is the second longest-running series of Rede Globo, with nine seasons and 323 episodes.

On March 11, 1999, the episode Mulher 2000 had its finale shown only in the North and Northeast regions (along with portions of the Southeast and the Center-West regions) due to a blackout in Brazil and Paraguay in 1999 that greatly affected much of the country at the time of the show.

In its final years, the program aired on Thursday nights shortly after Linha Direta. The last episode aired on August 17, 2000. The following week, the program was replaced with the miniseries Aquarela do Brasil (Watercolors of Brazil). Brazilian soap opera stars participated in the episodes, with some appearing in up to eight episodes.

In Portugal, RTP 1 ran some episodes in the early 1990s, but the run proved unsuccessful.

The format was also sold to China in 1994, with Beijing Television receiving a package of 26 episodes. At a time when few private telephone lines existed, Globo and BTV insisted that viewers should watch the program in shops and instead of the usual phone-in decision, it was up to the viewers, who were interviewed live, to select the ending.

In 1996 TVP1 (Polish Television (first Programme)) bought the licence. The program ended in 2002. Other channels that bought the licence were BBC1 (Do The Right Thing) and RTL

=== Reprise ===
Some episodes were rerun from July 2 to July 20, 2001 as part of Vale a Pena Ver de Novo, presented by Susana Werner, in an attempt to increase the audience's numbers on the timeslot, which were down since the reprise of the novel Tropicaliente the previous year; however, the reruns' audience numbers were lower than any soap opera had recorded before - some episodes came in third, behind SBT and TV Record. In addition, Globo was under pressure from the Brazilian Public Ministry for airing episodes with age rating of 14 during the afternoon, where age-classified material was not permitted at that time.

The rejection to the reprise of Você Decide was so great that it motivated the creation of an anonymous site, which contained a text positioning itself against Globo's decision and a poll in which the permanence of the novels in Vale a Pena Ver de Novo won by a wide margin. With the total failure of Você Decide, as soon as the second week of reprise of the episodes, the network decided to re-run A Gata Comeu for the second time, which resulted in a quick recovery of ratings for the afternoon schedule.

Rede Globo alleged that the replay of Você Decide was scheduled only during the vacation period, which is not in keeping with what was released at the time of the restructuring of the program, when the project was to make Vale a Pena Ver de Novo a range of preferences for all entertainment programs, not just telenovelas; Mulher was the most popular choice to replace Você Decide.

== Personnel ==
Show directors included Paulo José, Roberto Talma, Herval Rossano, Fábio Sabag, André Schultz, Mario Márcio Bandarra and Roberto Farias.

Several actors and presenters appeared such as Antônio Fagundes, Walmor Chagas, Lima Duarte, Carolina Ferraz, Raul Cortez, Renata Ceribelli, Tony Ramos, Celso Freitas, Luciano Szafir and Susana Werner. They all stayed for more an extended period.

In 2026 new presenters appeared such as Luciano Huck.

== Hosts ==
Year	Presenter
1992	Antônio Fagundes
1992	Walmor Chagas
1993	Lima Duarte
1993	Carolina Ferraz
1993–1995	Raul Cortez
1993–1998	Tony Ramos
1998–1999	Celso Freitas
1999–2000	Luciano Szafir
2001	Susana Werner
2026–present	Luciano Huck

== Return ==
In 2016, came the intention of the broadcaster to continue the program with new episodes and debut a scheduled episode for 2017. Among the possible presenters, the possibility of choosing Antônio Fagundes who was the first presenter of the program or another personality of the present time as Patrícia Poeta.

Now under the care of the author and director João Falcão, the program has already had a pilot episode written and approved, but not yet recorded. It is hoped that, in addition to modernizing the format, new forms of interactivity will also be explored, going beyond the telephone to express opinions. "It has to do with (the old), but it is more sophisticated, in the sense that you not only decide the end, but the plot, where it goes," explains Falcão.
