= As Brasileiras =

Brazilian television series

- Also known as: The Brazilians - The Women
- Directed by: Daniel Filho
- Opening theme: "Bela Fera" by Pedro Luís e a Parede
- Country of origin: Brazil
- Original language: Portuguese
- No. of seasons: 1
- No. of episodes: 22

Production
- Production company: Estúdios Globo

Original release
- Network: Rede Globo
- Release: 2 February – 28 June 2012

Related
- As Cariocas

As Brasileiras (The Brazilians - The Women) is a Brazilian television series co-produced by Rede Globo and Lereby Productions. The series aired on Rede Globo from 2 February 2012 to 28 June 2012. The series is a spin-off of As Cariocas. Each episode has a separate storyline, all located in different Brazilian states.

== Premise ==
The series features a cast of 22 actresses representing Brazil's female diversity, such as Juliana Paes, Giovanna Antonelli, Gloria Pires, and Fernanda Montenegro. The series features powerful, fragile, funny, protective, beautiful, talented and insightful women.

== Notable cast members ==
- Juliana Paes
- Marcos Palmeira
- Leona Cavalli
- Cláudia Jimenez
- Edson Celulari
- Suyane Moreira
- Danton Mello
- Patrícia Pillar
- Marcello Antony
- Malu Galli
- Leandra Leal
- Fábio Assunção
- Ivete Sangalo
- Ísis Valverde
- Xuxa Meneghel
- Bianca Byington
- Giulia Gam
- Rodrigo Lombardi
- Werner Schünemann
- Christine Fernandes
- Alice Braga
- Rodrigo Santoro
- Babu Santana
- Maria Fernanda Cândido
- Letícia Sabatella
- Camila Morgado
- Caco Ciocler
- Giovanna Antonelli
- Vivianne Pasmanter
- Sandy
- Fernanda Paes Leme
- Juliana Alves
- Mariana Ximenes
- Guilherme Fontes
- Glória Pires
- Nicette Bruno
- Tony Ramos
- Maria Flor
- Bruna Linzmeyer
- Mateus Solano
- Cléo Pires
- Bruno Gagliasso
- Sophie Charlotte
- Malvino Salvador
- Cris Vianna
- Priscila Fantin
- Dira Paes
- Dalton Vigh
- Betty Faria
- Fernanda Montenegro
- Paulo José

== Episodes ==
No.	Title	Directed by	Written by	Original release date	Brazil viewers (Rating points)
1	"A Justiceira de Olinda"	Cris D'Amato	Marcos Bernstein	2 February 2012	20
Janaína believes she is being cheated on. After discovering the truth, Janaína tries to solve the mess she has caused. Cast : Juliana Paes as Janaína, Marcos Palmeira as Anderson, Leona Cavalli as Valquíria, Cyria Coentro as Neighbor, Maria Menezes as Neighbor, George Sauma as Marketer, Fernando Ceylão as Nurse, Maria Helena Pader as Hotel receptionist
2	"A Inocente de Brasília"	Cris D'Amato & Daniel Filho	Gregorio Duvivier	9 February 2012	16
Augusta is a good-hearted woman who has infinite faith in human beings. She is madly in love with her boss, handsome Dantas, who takes advantage of her innocence to use her in a scheme to embezzle money. Cast : Cláudia Jimenez as Augusta Ramil, Suely Franco as Verinha, Flávio Bauraqui as Tadeu, Edson Celulari as Jair Dantas, Ary Fontoura as Castorino, Marcelo Olinto
3	"A Selvagem de Santarém"	Tizuka Yamasaki	Ana Maria Moretzsohn & Marcius Melhem & Sylvio Gonçalves	16 February 2012	15
Araí becomes the fantasy of Diogo's dreams. Cast : Suyane Moreira as Araí, Danton Mello as Diogo Matos, Fábio Porchat as Furtado, Cláudio Torres Gonzaga as Profesor Jeremias, Laila Zaid as Cibele, Cláudio Tovar as Xamã, Arthur Monteiro, Thaíssa Carvalho as Jupiara
4	"A Viúva do Maranhão"	Tizuka Yamasaki	Ary Franklin & Marcelo Saback	23 February 2012	15
Ludmila surrenders to widowhood after the death of her husband Justos Barreto, but does everything she can to find a new love. Cast : Patrícia Pillar as Ludimila Barreto, Marcello Antony as Edson, Suzana Faini as Dona Diva, Malu Galli as Marilene, Leopoldo Pacheco as Peçonha, Flávio Tolezani as Paulo
5	"A Sexóloga de Floripa"	Cris D'Amato	Ana Maria Moretzsohn & Carol Castro & Márcio Alemão	1 March 2012	15
A sexologist is the host of a popular television program where she gives her viewers tips on sex. Cast : Leandra Leal as Rosa Maria, Fábio Assunção as Pablo Pontes, Anderson Müller as Lino, Letícia Isnard as Roberta, Dani Barros as Carmem Siqueira, Herbert Richers Jr. as Nelson Luis, Renata Castro Barbosa as Keila
6	"A Desastrada de Salvador"	Cris D'Amato	Sylvio Gonçalves	8 March 2012	15
Raquel is a twisted Bahian who gets into one mess after another. Cast : Ivete Sangalo as Raquel, Theresa Amayo as Helena, Emanuelle Araújo as Úrsula, Charles Fricks as Tulio, Lucci Ferreira as Mauro, Armando Babaioff as Pedro, Cristiane Amorim as Telma
7	"A Culpada de BH"	Tizuka Yamazaki	Clarice Falcão & Márcio Alemão	15 March 2012	17
Catherine is a romantic girl, but very unlucky. Even though she is unlucky, she hopes that one day she will meet her Prince Charming. She meets a handsome doctor. Cast : Ísis Valverde as Catarina, Raquel Fabri as Jô, Bianca Comparato as Natasha, Humberto Martins as Vitório, Lavínia Vlasak as Isabel, Norma Blum as Glédis
8	"A Fofoqueira de Porto Alegre"	Daniel Filho	Carolina Castro & Jô Abdu	22 March 2012	15
Rita loves to gossip. The problem is that she finds out that her life is not as perfect as she imagined. Cast : Xuxa Meneghel as Rita Prates, Bianca Byington as Flávia, Giulia Gam as Soraya, Malu Valle as Helena, Rodrigo Lombardi as Rodrigo Prates, Cláudio Manoel as Walmir, Serjão Loroza as Éder, Werner Schünemann as Alberto Galledo, Christine Fernandes as Lili Galledo
9	"A Indomável do Ceará"	Cris D'Amato	Marcelo Saback	29 March 2012	15
Mirtes is a hard-line police officer who ends up falling in love with Carioca, a highly dangerous criminal. Cast : Alice Braga as Mirtes, Rodrigo Santoro as Carioca, Carla Daniel as Jupiara, Gerson Lobo as Genésio, Babu Santana as Edmundo
10	"A Perseguida de Curitiba"	Tizuka Yamazaki	Sylvio Gonçalves	5 April 2012	16
Sandra is a beautiful woman, but insists on disguising herself. On her wedding anniversary with Jorge she decides to change her routine and visits a sex shop. Cast : Maria Fernanda Cândido as Sandra, Daniel Boaventura as Jorge, Paulo Vespúcio as Thief, Christiana Kalache as Heloísa, Gottsha as Masseuse, Analu Prestes as Adelaide, Cristina Prochaska as Iolanda, Marcelo Torreão as man in the party, Pedro Nercessian as Young fan, César Cardadeiro as Young fan, Tatiana Vereza as Sex store employee, Gilberto Torres as TV news anchor
11	"A Apaixonada de Niterói"	Cris D'Amato	Jô Abdu	12 April 2012	13
Monique turns to the forces from beyond to win Marcelo back. Cast : Letícia Sabatella as Monique, Camila Morgado as Mãe Vitória, Caco Ciocler as Marcelo, Débora Lamm as Julinha
12	"A Venenosa de Sampa"	Cris D'Amato & Daniel Filho	Adriana Falcão & Jô Abdu	19 April 2012	17
Gigi is a spoiled, vain, millionaire woman who spends all her time in the gym and is capable of blowing up anyone who tries to take her shine. Cast : Giovanna Antonelli as Gigi, Vivianne Pasmanter as Maria Eduarda Stein, Fernando Eiras as Edmar Ramon, Flávio Galvão as Luiz Felipe Stein, Cláudio Tovar as Joseph La Rocche, Cláudio Torres Gonzaga as Geraldo, Roberto Maya as Dimas Durango
13	"A Reacionária do Pantanal"	Tizuka Yamasaki	Ana Maria Moretzsohn	26 April 2012	16
Gabriela is outraged to discover that Olinda is in love with Noemia, and doesn't understand why her mother has decided to become a lesbian. Cast : Sandy as Gabriela, Regina Braga as Olinda, Xuxa Lopes as Noêmia, Susana Ribeiro as Guiomar, Fernanda Paes Leme as Luísa, Cadu Fávero as Guilherme, Danton Mello as Gustavo, Guilherme Winter as Hugo, Pedro Neschling as Maurício, Jackson Antunes as Reginaldo, Tamara Taxman as Susana, Carlo Mossy as Frederico
14	"A Mascarada do ABC"	Cris D'Amato	Marcelo Saback	3 May 2012	17
Rubi convinces Janice to work as a dancer in a men's nightclub and she is a big hit. What she didn't expect was to find her husband in the front row of the show. Cast : Juliana Alves as Janice, Ângelo Antônio as Samuel, Marcelo Saback as Rubi, Mauro Mendonça as Jonas, Oscar Magrini
15	"A Adormecida de Foz do Iguaçu"	Cris D'Amato	Sylvio Gonçalves & Ana Maria Moretzsohn	10 May 2012	16
Liliane hasn't been able to sleep since the First International Tourism Forum of the Falls began. To put an end to the problem she takes medicine and does things that even God doubts. Cast : Mariana Ximenes as Liliane, Guilherme Fontes as Nelson, Guilhermina Guinle as Helena, Esteban Lamarque as Juan, Sebastião Lemos
16	"A Mamãe da Barra"	Cris D'Amato	Thalita Rebouças & Ana Maria Moretzsohn	17 May 2012	20
Angela Cristina is a strong-willed woman who faces the tantrums of Malu, her pre-teen daughter. Angela Cristina tries to adapt to Malu's universe, but is only rebuffed by her. Cast : Glória Pires as Ângela Cristina, Ana Pires de Morais as Child Maria de Lurdes "Malu", Antônia Morais as Young Maria de Lurdes "Malu", Isio Ghelman as Aluísio, Nicette Bruno as Dona Isaura, Chris Couto as Mother at the party, Luisa Thiré as Mother at the party, Ana Abbott as Teacher, Tony Ramos as Aluisio (voice)
17	"A De Menor do Amazonas"	Tizuka Yamasaki	Ana Maria Moretzsohn	24 May 2012	17
Sexy Shirley dresses up as a girl to get away from the police and ends up getting involved with Fernando, the father of one of her friends. Cast : Maria Flor as Shirley, Marcos Palmeira as Fernando Lima, Jeniffer de Oliveira Andrade as Suzana, Otávio Augusto as Loureiro, Rita Guedes as Astrid Meireles, Roberta Rodrigues as Dirce, Júlio Braga as Loureiro's friend
18	"A Vidente de Diamantina"	Daniel Filho	Gregório Duvivier & Clarice Falcão	31 May 2012	15
Clara is a girl who can see the future of her relationships through kissing. Cast : Bruna Linzmeyer as Clara, Gregório Duvivier as Júlio, Mateus Solano as Heitor, Rafael Primot as Flávio, Eva Todor as Dona Conchita, Clarice Falcão as Girl at the bar
19	"O Anjo de Alagoas"	Tizuka Yamasaki	Ana Maria Moretszohn & Jô Abdu & Sylvio Gonçalves	7 June 2012	16
Ana is a vigilante who kills villains mercilessly, but sees her life change when she is hired to kill Colonel José Honório. Cast : Cléo Pires as Ana, Bruno Gagliasso as Zé Sereno, Carla Daniel as Clotilde, José Rubens Chachá as Colonel José Honório, Júlio Adrião as Alma Penada, Lincoln Vargas
20	"A Sambista da BR-116"	Cris D'Amato & Daniel Filho	Marcelo Saback	14 June 2012	16
Esplendor is the samba dancer from BR116, a young girl born in the middle of Sapucaí and who does everything she can to fulfill her dream of becoming a dancer, a wish she inherited from her mother, who died during childbirth. Cast : Sophie Charlotte as Esplendor, Malvino Salvador as Sinvaldo, Cris Vianna as Marlene, Priscila Fantin as Berenice, Lucy Ramos as Dagmar, Clarice Niskier as Cidinha
21	"A Doméstica de Vitória"	Tizuka Yamasaki	Maria Helena Nascimento & Ana Maria Moretzsohn	21 June 2012	16
Cleonice, Victoria's housekeeper, works at the home of the writer Muriel and sees her life change completely when she decides to pose as her boss at a party. Cast : Dira Paes as Cleonice, Dalton Vigh as Fernando, Betty Faria as Muriel, Inez Viana as Zezé, Carolina Oliveira as Cíntia
22	"Maria do Brasil"	Daniel Filho	Ana Maria Moretzsohn & Daniel Filho	28 June 2012	12
Mary is a somewhat frustrated actress who has never achieved her dream of stardom. However, with the support of her faithful friend Ney, she decides to get back into the fight and take on a new job. Cast : Fernanda Montenegro as Mary Torres, Paulo José as Rômulo, Pedro Paulo Rangel as Ney, Gustavo Falcão, Felipe Koury as Soap Opera Director, Pedro Nercessian, Cris D'Amato as Lorena, Tammy Di Calafiori as herself, Gustavo Leão as himself, Pietro Mário as Fan

== Ratings ==
Season	Episodes	First aired		Last aired		Avg. viewers (in points)
Season	Episodes	Date	Viewers (in points)	Date	Viewers (in points)	Avg. viewers (in points)
1	22	2 February 2012	20	28 June 2012	12	15.91
