= Larissa Queiroz =

Brazilian actress (born 1984)

- Born: August 24, 1984 (age 41); Rio de Janeiro, Brazil
- Occupation: Actress

Larissa Queiroz (born August 24, 1984 in Rio de Janeiro) is a Brazilian actress.

== Filmography ==
=== Television ===
- 1993 - Sonho Meu - Bruna
- 1994 - Quatro por Quatro - Fabíola
- 1995 - Você Decide - (episode: "O Motim")
- 1995 - História de Amor - Larissa
- 1997 - Por Amor - Juliana Fontes
- 1999 - Chiquinha Gonzaga - Maria do Patrocínio Gonzaga do Amaral (child)
- 1999 - Vila Madalena - Tamara
- 2001 - Um Anjo Caiu do Céu - Luana
- 2003 - Agora É que São Elas - Xica
- 2004 - Senhora do Destino - Carolina (uncredited)
- 2004 - Como uma Onda - Carol Lemos
- 2007 - Paraíso Tropical - Rita
- 2009 - Viver a Vida - Gilda (Gildinha)
- 2011 - Insensato Coração - Selma Macedo (Selminha)
- 2012 - Cheias de Charme - Elena

== Cinema ==
- 2006 - The Ugly Duckling and Me! - Phyllis (Brazilian voice dubbing)
