= Um Anjo Caiu do Céu =

2001 Brazilian telenovela

- Genre: Telenovela
- Created by: Antônio Calmon
- Written by: Eliane Garcia; Lílian Garcia; Márcia Prates; Maria Helena Nascimento; Álvaro Ramos
- Directed by: Dennis Carvalho
- Starring: Tarcísio Meira; Caio Blat; Renata Sorrah; Christiane Torloni; José Wilker; Patricia Pillar; Marcello Antony; Débora Falabella
- Opening theme: "Ando Meio Desligado" by Pato Fu
- Country of origin: Brazil
- Original language: Portuguese
- No. of episodes: 185

Production
- Camera setup: Multi-camera

Original release
- Network: TV Globo
- Release: 22 January – 25 August 2001

Um Anjo Caiu do Céu is a Brazilian telenovela produced and broadcast by TV Globo. It premiered on 22 January 2001, replacing Uga-Uga, and ended on 25 August 2001, replaced by As Filhas da Mãe. The telenovela is written by Antônio Calmon, with the collaboration of Eliane Garcia, Lílian Garcia, Márcia Prates, Maria Helena Nascimento, and Álvaro Ramos.

It stars Tarcísio Meira, Caio Blat, Renata Sorrah, Christiane Torloni, José Wilker, Patricia Pillar, Marcello Antony, and Débora Falabella.

== Cast ==
- Tarcísio Meira as João Medeiros
- Caio Blat as Rafael
- Renata Sorrah as Naná
- Christiane Torloni as Laila de Montaltino
- José Wilker as Tarso
- Débora Falabella as Cuca
- Henri Castelli as Breno
- Patrícia Pillar as Duda
- Deborah Evelyn as Virgínia
- Marcello Antony as Maurício
- Caco Ciocler as David
- Cássio Gabus Mendes as Paulinho / Paulão
- Angélica as Angelina
- Chris Couto as Eva Lenya
- Supla as Alex de Leon
- Débora Lamm as Alice Maciel
- Susana Werner as Deborah
- Felipe Camargo as Josué
- Sthefany Brito as Dorinha"
- Jonatas Faro as Joaquim "Kiko"
- Antônio Petrin as Carlos dos Anjos "Carlão"
- Ana Rosa as Laurinda dos Anjos
- Paulo José as Alceu
- Miriam Pires as Ermelinda
- Caio Junqueira as Adolfinho
- Mariana Hein as Carolina "Carol" Pascoal
- Janaína Lince as Joana Soares "Jô"
- Karine Carvalho as Michelle
- Rodrigo Eldestein as André "Dé"
- Rosane Gofman as Expedita
- Luís Salem as Ávila Brunner
- Gustavo Mello as Fernando "Nando"
- Zé Carlos Machado as Emanuel Steinberg
- Bel Kutner as Luciana "Lulu"
- João Camargo as Gildo
- Maria Gladys as Zezé
- Larissa Queiroz as Luana
- Thiago Oliveira as Felipe "Lipe" Medeiros
- Michel Capeletti as Robson dos Anjos
- João Paulo Biancardini as Gustavo "Guga" Medeiros

=== Guest stars ===
- Daniel Dantas as Selmo de Windsor / Zeca de Santa Teresa / Telmo Martins
- Jan Ponan as Eric Brunner
- Tarcísio Filho as Rodrigo Medeiros Ferreira
- Hugo Carvana as Sargento Garcia
- Luma Costa as Young Ermelinda
- Luciano Szafir as Eduardo
- Guilherme Weber as Carl
- Odilon Wagner as Sid Valente / Coyote
- Sérgio Loroza as Jacaré
- Fabiana Oliveira as Alexandra
- Matheus Rocha as Tomás
- Breno Moroni as Pingue
- Eduardo Andrade as Pongue
- Alexandre Zacchia as Peçanha
- Sílvia Bandeira as Giovana
- Dennis Carvalho as Jaime
