= Marcos Winter =

Brazilian actor

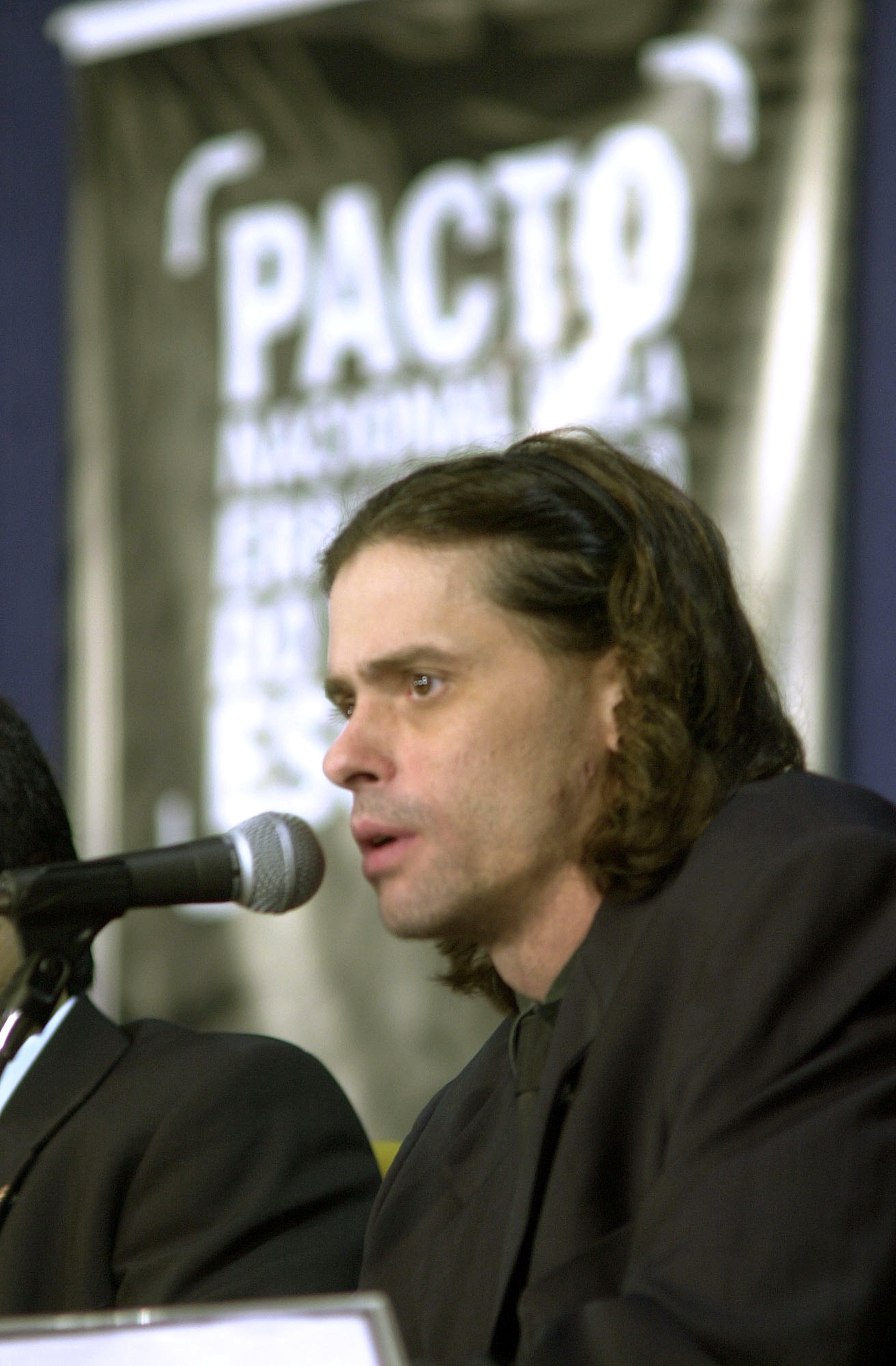
- Winter, 2005
- Born: Marcos César Simarelli Winter; São Paulo, Brazil
- Occupation: Actor
- Years active: 1988–present

Marcos César Simarelli Winter is a Brazilian actor.

== Filmography ==
- 2019 Segunda Chamada
- 2017 Apocalipse - Oswaldo RecordTV
- 2015 Magnifica 70 - Vicente HBO Brasil
- 2013 Flor do Caribe - Reynaldo Rede Globo
- 2010 Malhação - Odilon Rede Globo
- 2010 As Cariocas - Élber Rede Globo
- 2009 Vende-se um Véu de Noiva (For sale is a Veil of Bride) - Doctor Homero Reis SBT
- 2007/2008 Duas Caras - Narciso Tellerman Rede Globo
- 2007 Amazônia, de Galvez a Chico Mendes - Neto Rede Globo
- 2007 Pé na Jaca - Luchino Rede Globo
- 2006 Avassaladoras - A série - Alê Rede Record
- 2005 Essas Mulheres - Eduardo Abreu Rede Record
- 2004 Um Só Coração - Luís Martins Rede Globo
- 2003 Agora É que São Elas - Heitor Rede Globo
- 2001 Estrela-Guia - Bob Rede Globo
- 1999 Vila Madalena - Roberto Rede Globo
- 1998 Pecado Capital - Virgílio Lisboa Rede Globo
- 1998 Corpo Dourado - Arthurzinho Rede Globo
- 1997 A Indomada - Hércules Pedreira Rede Globo
- 1996 O fim do mundo - Nado Mendonça Rede Globo
- 1995 Irmãos Coragem - Eduardo Coragem (Duda) Rede Globo
- 1994 Fera Ferida - Cassi Jones de Azevedo Rede Globo
- 1993 Agosto - Cláudio Aguiar Rede Globo
- 1991 Felicidade - José Diogo Rede Globo
- 1991 Floradas na serra - Flávio Manchete
- 1990 Pantanal - Jove (Joventino neto) Manchete
- 1990 Desejo - Dinorá Rede Globo
- 1989 Tieta - Osmar Rede Globo
- 1988 Vida Nova - Antoninho Rede Globo
