= Patrícia França =

Brazilian actress (born 1971)

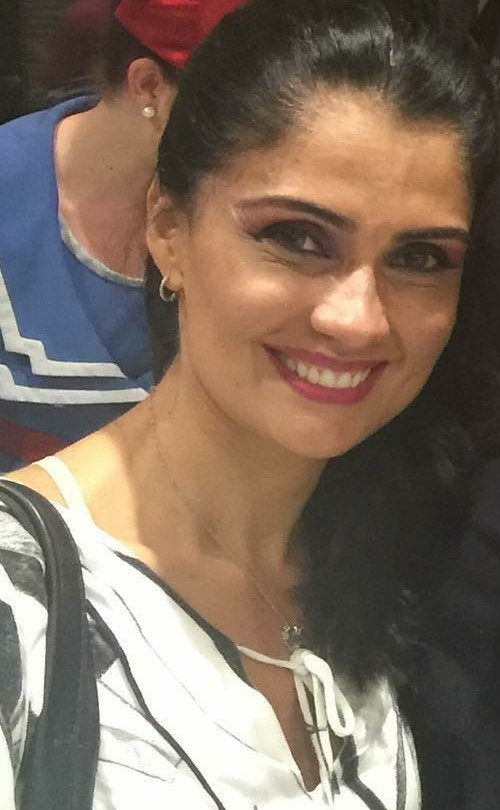
- França in 2018
- Born: Patrícia França Monteiro de Oliveira; September 28, 1971 (age 53); Recife, Brazil
- Occupation: Actress
- Spouse(s): Ilya São Paulo (1995–1997); Paulo Lins (1999–2006); Wagner Pontes (2008–present)
- Children: 2

Patrícia França Monteiro de Oliveira (September 28, 1971, Recife, Brazil) is a Brazilian actress.

== Biography ==
She began her career in theater as a child and won awards, including the play A Ver Estrelas. Her first job was in the national headlines Tereza Batista miniseries, produced by Rede Globo. Rede Globo, gained prominence in the novels Sonho Meu, Suave Veneno (being the cover of national soundtrack) and A Padroeira, plus a cameo in Chocolate com Pimenta.

After ten years of returns in 2014 on Rede Globo interpreting Delma in Malhação, mother of a teenager who dreams of becoming a rockstar.

== Personal life ==
Was married to actor Ilya São Paulo between 1995 and 1997 and systems analyst Paulo Lins between 1999 and 2006, being the father of her first daughter, and Fernanda. She married since 2008 with entrepreneur Wagner Pontes, who had her second child Gabriel.

== Filmography ==
=== Television ===
Year	Title	Role	Notes
1992	Tereza Batista	Tereza Batista	
1993	Renascer	Maria Santa	Episodes: "March 8–11, 1993"
1993	Sonho Meu	Cláudia Lins	
1995	Engraçadinha: Seus Amores e Seus Pecados	Nun	Episodes: "March 25–26, 1995"
1995	Você Decide	Dalva	Episode: "Pacto de Silêncio"
1995	Caso Especial	Nevinha	Episode: "A Farsa da Boa Preguiça"
1996	O Fim do Mundo	Lucilene Barbosa	
1996	Salsa e Merengue	Madalena Sobral	
1998	Você Decide		Episode: "Guerra Suja"
1998	Você Decide	Rosana	Episode: "O Doce Sabor do Sucesso"
1998	Mulher		Episode: "Correndo Atrás"
1999	Suave Veneno	Clarisse Ribeiro	
1999	Renato Aragão Especial	Nanci	Episode: "Oliver & Didi"
2001	A Padroeira	Blanca de Sevilla	
2004	Chocolate com Pimenta	Drª. Sofia Menezes	Episodes: "March 8–May 7, 2004"
2004	A Escrava Isaura	Rosa Cunha Almeida	
2005	Prova de Amor	Diana Alba	
2007	Luz do Sol	Eliana Souza	
2009	Poder Paralelo	Nina Santana	
2014	Malhação Sonhos	Delma Ramos	Season 22

=== Films ===
- 1991 - A Última Terra (direct to video)
- 1992 - Contos de Balneário (direct to video)
- 1993 - O Calor da Pele.... Zélia
- 1994 - Chuvas e Trovoadas.... Teacher's daughter (short film)
- 1996 - Tieta do Agreste.... Imaculada / Tieta (young)
- 1999 - Orfeu.... Eurídice
- 2000 - Chega de Cangaço
- 2003 - As Tranças de Maria.... Maria
- 2008 - Mãos de Vento, Olhos de Dentro.... mother of Tico (short film)
- 2009 - Flordelis - Basta uma Palavra para Mudar.... mother of Beá

=== Theater ===
- 1985 - A Ver Estrelas
- 1994 - Peer Gynt.... Solveig
- 1994 - Aladim.... Jasmine
- 1995 - Péricles, príncipe de Tiro.... Marina
- 2002 - Terceiras Intenções.... Ana Paula
- 2006 - A Beata Maria do Egito.... beata
- 2015 - Ou Tudo ou Nada
- 2016 - Quando Eu For Mãe, Quero Amar Desse Jeito
