= História de Amor =

Brazilian telenovela

- Genre: Telenovela; Romantic; Drama
- Created by: Manoel Carlos
- Starring: Regina Duarte; Carla Marins; José Mayer; Carolina Ferraz; Lília Cabral; Nuno Leal Maia; Ângelo Paes Leme; Eva Wilma; Cláudio Corrêa e Castro; José de Abreu; Bia Nunnes; Yara Cortes; Umberto Magnanii; Marly Bueno; Cláudio Lins
- Opening theme: "Lembra de Mim"
- Composer: Ivan Lins
- Country of origin: Brazil
- Original language: Portuguese
- No. of episodes: 209

Production
- Running time: 50 minutes
- Production company: Rede Globo

Original release
- Network: TV Globo
- Release: July 3, 1995 – March 2, 1996

História de Amor (Love Story in English) is a Brazilian telenovela produced by TV Globo and aired from July 3, 1995 to March 2, 1996 in 209 episodes. It was the 48th "novela das seis" to be aired on the timeslot.

It was written by Manoel Carlos, in collaboration with Elizabeth Jhin, Marcus Toledo and Maria Carolina, directed by Ricardo Waddington, Roberto Naar and Alexander Avancini, artistic direction of Paul Ubiratan, direction, production Ruy Mattos.

The novel was Regina Duarte, José Mayer, Carla Marins, Carolina Ferraz, Eva Wilma, Cláudio Corrêa e Castro, Nuno Leal Maia, Lília Cabral, José de Abreu and Ângelo Paes Leme playing their central roles in the plot.

== Synopsis ==
Helena (Regina Duarte) is a sweet, honest, sensitive and very warlike woman who faces the untimely severity of her daughter Joyce (Carla Marins), who in turn is abandoned by her boyfriend, the irresponsible Caio (Ângelo Paes Leme). The biggest problem is the girl's father, Assunção (Nuno Leal Maia), Helena's ex-husband, who tries to blame his daughter's pregnancy on Helena's morals.

Single and alone, Helena arises a passion for endocrinologist Carlos Alberto (José Mayer), and has her feelings matched. But Carlos is committed to a possessive Paula (Carolina Ferraz), madly in love with him, who suffers from constant bouts of jealousy. Her parents, Zuleika (Eva Wilma) and Rômulo (Cláudio Corrêa e Castro), are looking forward to or marrying their daughter with Carlos, who will save the family from financial decline.

But Carlos is the kind of man that as women really do not forget. Even married to Paula and in love with Helena, he is still besieged by ex-wife Sheyla (Lília Cabral), who does not like to have lost him and dreams of a rapprochement.

== Cast ==
Actor	Character
Regina Duarte	Helena Soares
José Mayer	Carlos Alberto Moretti
Carla Marins	Joyce Soares Assunção
Carolina Ferraz	Paula Sampaio Moretti
Ângelo Paes Leme	Caio Paiva
Lília Cabral	Sheila Bueno
Nuno Leal Maia	Edgar Assunção
Eva Wilma	Zuleika Sampaio
Cláudio Corrêa e Castro	Rômulo Sampaio
José de Abreu	Daniel Veloso
Cristina Prochaska	Yara Machado
Bia Nunnes	Marta Xavier
Ricardo Petraglia	Sinval Xavier
Cláudia Lira	Vandinha (Vanda Furtado Diniz)
Claudia Mauro	Valquíria Assunção
Yara Cortes	Olga Moretti Miranda
Sebastião Vasconcelos	Urbano Paiva
Ana Rosa	Dalva Paiva
Umberto Magnani	Mauro Moretti
Marly Bueno	Rafaela Moretti
Cláudio Lins	Bruno Moretti
Maria Ribeiro	Bianca Moretti
Flávia Alessandra	Soninha Toledo
Cristina Mullins	Maristela Gomide
Monique Curi	Mariana Gomide Sampaio
Hugo Gross	Leonardo Sampaio
Christine Fernandes	Marininha
Mônica Carvalho	Neusa
Beatriz Lyra	Silvana Furtado
Sérgio Viotti	Gregório Furtado
Marcelo Saback	Renato Santana
Dennis Carvalho	Vicente Gomide
Rosane Gofman	Matilde
Maria Alves	Nazaré
Guilherme Faro	Fábio Barroso
Fernando Wellington	Mendonça
Vicente Barcellos	Gabriel
Gláucia Rodrigues	Gertrudes
Paula de Paula	Tânia
Cláudia Paiva	Madalena
Giácomo Pinotti	Leopoldo Diniz

Supporting cast

- Alexia Deschamps - Márcia Vieira Salles
- Andréa Avancini - cliente de Carlos
- André Ricardo - Luiz Assunção (Luizinho)
- Buza Ferraz - Marcos
- Carolyna Aguiar - Lu
- Edson Silva - Ramiro
- Fábio Junqueira - Fabrício
- Felipe Vasconcelos - Walter
- Fernanda Nobre - Student Assunção
- Francisco Carvalho - Zé
- Ilva Niño - Chica
- Ingrid Fridman - Ritinha Xavier
- Isabela Bicalho - Elizete
- Jorge Cherques - Noé
- Jorge Coutinho - Ernani
- José Augusto Branco - Dr. Alfredo (doctor who examines Olga)
- Joyce Santos - Kátia
- Júlia Almeida - Duda
- Júnior Prata - Herculano (Gas station attendant where Paula and Helena fight)
- Larissa Queiroz - Student Assunção
- Licurgo Spínola - doctor
- Milton Gonçalves - priest
- Nica Bonfim - Roseli (wife of Ramiro)
- Nívea Stelmann - Store clerk
- Sérgio Hondjakoff - Student Assunção
- Tatiana Issa - Louise
- Thomas Morkos - Zezinho
- Úrsula Corona - Aninha
