= Ariclê Perez =

- Born: 7 September 1943; Campinas, São Paulo, Brazil
- Died: 26 March 2006 (aged 62); São Paulo, Brazil
- Occupation: Actress
- Years active: 1967–2006
- Spouse: Flávio Rangel

Ariclê Perez (7 September 1943 – 26 March 2006) was a Brazilian actress.

== Biography ==
Perez was born on 7 September 1943 in Campinas. She was married to theatre director Flávio Rangel. With her career being predominantly in theatre, she took part in more than 40 theatrical performances, a good part of them directed by Rangel. She made her debut in a 1967 performance Electra.

Contracted by Rede Globo starting in 1988, she participated uninterrupted in various novelas and miniseries. Some of her most well-known roles include Elisinha Jordão in the second version of Anjo Mau (1997), Rosa Maria in Meu Bem, Meu Mal (1990) and Ametista in Felicidade (1991). Before her contracting with Globo, she participated in Cortina de Vidro, on SBT and Como Salvar Meu Casamento, the last novela of the now-defunct Rede Tupi, which did not go on to have a finale.

Her last role was in the miniseries JK, where she played the mother of former president Juscelino Kubitschek, Júlia Kubitschek, in the second phase of the drama. During the same time period, she was one of the favorite actresses of Maria Adelaide Amaral, the author of the miniseries, with her having worked in practically every series she has written since Anjo Mau.

== Career ==
=== Television ===
Year	Title	Role	Notes
1976	Canção para Isabel	Nancy	
1979	Como Salvar Meu Casamento	Valquíria	
1989	Sampa	Lucy	
1989	Cortina de Vidro	Mirtes	
1990	Meu Bem, Meu Mal	Rosa Maria Gentil / Rose Marie Costa Brava	
1991	Felicidade	Ametista de Sousa	
1992	Perigosas Peruas	Promotora	Guest appearance
1992	Você Decide		Episode: "Romance Moderno"
1994	Memorial de Maria Moura	Gertrudes	
1995	Decadência	Celeste Tavares Branco	
1995	Deu a Louca na Fantasia	Rainha	Christmas special
1996	Salsa e Merengue	Gilda Campos Queiroz	
1997	Anjo Mau	Elisinha Jordão Ferraz	
1998	Você Decide		Episode: "Um Lar Para Clarice"
2000	Você Decide	Lúcia Nunes	Episode: "Pré-datado"
2001	Os Maias	Maria da Gama	
2002	Sandy &amp; Junior	Olga Bovanova	Episode: "S.O.S Sandy"
2003	A Casa das Sete Mulheres	Madre Cecília da Purificação	
2004	A Diarista	Pérola	Episode: "Lady Laura"
2004	Sob Nova Direção	Branca	Episode: "Como Ser Perua"
2004	Um Só Coração	Madame Claire	
2006	JK	Júlia Kubitschek	(2nd phase)

=== Film ===
Year	Title	Role
1971	Paixão na Praia	Mulher na Festa
1981	Pixote	Professora
2005	Quanto Vale ou É por Quilo?	Marta Figueiredo

== Theatre ==
- 1967 - Electra
- 1968 - Tarzan do Terceiro Mundo
- 1968 - Fernando ou O Cinto Acusador
- 1969 - Hair
- 1971 - Peer Gynt (with Stênio Garcia, Jonas Bloch, Ricardo Blat, Ewerton de Castro, and Roberto Frota.)
- 1972 - Man of La Mancha
- 1972 - Fernando Pessoa
- 1973 - Hoje É Dia de Rock
- 1973 - Ensaio Selvagem
- 1974 - Réveillon
- 1974 - Pippin
- 1975 - Os Executivos
- 1975 - Bye Bye Pororoca
- 1975 - Abajur Lilás
- 1976 - À Margem da Vida
- 1978 - Investigação na Classe Dominante
- 1980 - Campeões do Mundo
- 1983 - Rei Lear
- 1984/1985 - Freud - No Distante País da Alma
- 1999 - Vestidos

=== Award ===
- Perez won an award for Best Supporting Actress at the Festival do Ceará for the film Quanto Vale ou É por Quilo?.

== Death ==
On 26 March 2006, two days after JK ended, Perez died from "falling out of the window" of her apartment where she lived alone. On the night of her death, an employee in the apartment building alerted police at 19:00 that day, where they found her corpse at the internal entrance to the parking garage. Prior to her death, she had suffered from severe depression. The events that led up to her death are still unknown, with some hypothesizing that she had died by suicide.
