= Poder Paralelo =

- Created by: Lauro César Muniz
- Directed by: Ignácio Coqueiro
- Starring: Gabriel Braga Nunes; Tuca Andrada; Paloma Duarte; Marcelo Serrado; Petrônio Gontijo; Miriam Freeland
- Opening theme: Bellissimo Così by Laura Pausini
- Country of origin: Brazil
- Original language: Portuguese
- No. of episodes: 243

Production
- Running time: approx. 60 minutes

Original release
- Network: RecordTV
- Release: April 14, 2010 – March 10, 2011

Poder Paralelo (English: Another Power) is a Brazilian telenovela produced by Rede Record that premiered on April 14, 2009 and ended on March 10, 2010. Written by Lauro César Muniz and directed by Ignácio Coqueiro, it will portray a corruption scheme involving an Italian-Brazilian family. Prior to Record's official announcement, the media was referring to the telenovela by its working title Vendetta. It ran for one season.

== Plot ==
The telenovela focuses on Tony Castellamare, a Brazilian citizen of Italian origin living in Palermo. He maintains the image of a merchant exporter, but is actually the leader of the Sicilian Mafia. After an attack aimed at him kills his wife Marina and their twin daughters, Tony returns to São Paulo seeking revenge, at the same time he is investigated by the uncorruptible federal police officer Teolônio "Téo" Meira.

== Inspiration ==
Poder Paralelo is based on Honra ou Vendetta, the only novel by sports journalist and cuisine author Sílvio Lancelotti, originally published in 2001. The plot, however, had to be readapted, since the book contained only five major female characters.

According to Muniz, Téo is based on the federal police officer Protógenes Queiroz, responsible for the investigation and arrest of banker Daniel Dantas, accused of money laundering and convicted for attempting to bribe a federal police officer.

== Editing controversy ==
The head of Rede Record vetoed Muniz from writing scenes featuring thighs, breasts, buttocks and coarse language. This caused a controversy in Brazil, as well as accusations of hypocrisy from the head of the network, once violent scenes, featuring as even as torture, remained untouched.

== Main cast ==
- Gabriel Braga Nunes - Tony Castellamare
- Tuca Andrada - Telônio "Téo" Meira
- Paloma Duarte - Fernanda Lira
- Marcelo Serrado - Bruno Vilar
- Petrônio Gontijo - Rudi Castellamare
- Miriam Freeland - Lígia Brandini
- Adriana Garambone - Maura Vilar
- Gracindo Júnior - Don Caló Castellamare
- Lu Grimaldi - Mamma Freda Castellamare
- Karen Junqueira - Giana "Gigi" Castellamare
- Paulo Gorgulho - José Santana
- Maria Ribeiro - Marília
- Cecil Thiré - Armando
- Márcio Kieling - Alberto
- Fernanda Nobre - Luísa
- Guilherme Boury - Pedro
- Patrícia França - Nina Santana
- Bete Coelho - Vânia
- André Bankoff - André Campos
- Miguel Thiré - Douglas (Dog)
- Luma Costa - Bebel
- Castrinho - Leonel Pavão
- Nicola Siri - Paulo Garzia
- Antônio Abujamra - Marco Iago
- Marly Bueno - Sônia Meira

== Soundtrack ==
Soundtrack is the song "Bellissimo Cosí" by Laura Pausini.
