= Cláudia Magno =

Brazilian actress and dancer

- Born: Cláudia Magno de Carvalho; February 10, 1958; Rio de Janeiro, Brazil
- Died: January 6, 1994 (aged 35); Rio de Janeiro, Brazil
- Occupations: Actress; ballerina

Cláudia Magno de Carvalho (February 10, 1958 – January 6, 1994) was a Brazilian actress and dancer.

The actress began her career in 1981, working on various plays. She participated in the blockbuster movie Menino do Rio in 1982, and was then called by Rede Globo to participate in the novel Final Feliz. She also appeared in the films Garota Dourada (1984) and Presença de Marisa (1988), for which she won the Candango for best actress at the Festival de Brasília in 1988.

Claudia died of acute respiratory failure due to AIDS at the São Vicente clinic in Gávea. When she died, she was working on the telenovela Sonho Meu, which housed nurse Josefina, as well as rehearsing a musical with actor Jonas Bloch.

== Filmography ==
=== Television ===
Year	Title	Role	Notes
1982	Final Feliz	false Bartira	Participation
1983	Champagne	Mariah	
1984	Viver a Vida	Maria Eduarda	
1985	Tudo em Cima	Carmem	
1985	Um Sonho a Mais	Regina	
1986	Roda de Fogo	Vera Santos	
1988	Fera Radical	Vicky (Victória Regina Fernandes)	
1989	Bebê a Bordo	Gilda	Episodes: "January 19–February 10"
1989	Tieta	Silvana Pitombo	
1990	Delegacia de Mulheres		Episode: "Por um Triz"
1990	Mico Preto	Sworn	Support cast
1990	Mãe de Santo	Valéria	Episode: "Iansã"
1990	Meu Bem, Meu Mal	Eulália	Episode: "October 29"
1991	Filhos do Sol	Ludmila	
1991	O Dono do Mundo	Flávia Araripe	Participation
1992	Felicidade	Renée	Participation
1993	Você Decide		Episode: "O Direito de Morrer"
1993	Sonho Meu	Josefina Machado	Final television role

=== Films ===
Year	Title	Role
1982	Menino do Rio	Patrícia Monteiro
1984	Garota Dourada	Patrícia Monteiro
1988	Presença de Marisa	

== Notes ==
- Cláudia Magno was the girlfriend of actor Marcelo Ibrahim.
