= Marly Bueno =

Brazilian actress (1933–2012)

- Born: Amalia Angelina Marly D'Angelo; June 11, 1933; São Paulo, São Paulo, Brazil
- Died: April 12, 2012 (aged 78); Rio de Janeiro, Rio de Janeiro, Brazil
- Occupation: Actress
- Years active: 1950–1962; 1991–2012

Marly Bueno, stage name of Amalia Angelina Marly D'Angelo (June 11, 1933 – April 12, 2012) was a Brazilian actress.

== Biography ==
Born in the neighborhood of Cidade Vargas, in the district of Jabaquara, in the city of São Paulo in 1933, she was the first woman to appear on Brazilian television, alongside her sister Miriam Simone, as a spokesperson for TV na Taba, on Brazilian television's debut in 1950 on Rede Tupi. At the pioneering broadcaster, he worked on several productions between 1950 and 1961.

During this same period, he made his film debut in The Lero-Lero Family, directed by Alberto Pieralisi. In cinema, she also acted in the productions Na Senda do Crime, Dorinha no Soçaite, Chão Bruto, and Entre Mulheres e Espiões. In 1963, she left her career to devote herself to her personal life after marrying screenwriter Hilton Marques, a writer associated with comedian Jô Soares' programs, with whom she had her only daughter, costume designer Patrícia D'Angelo. Between 1965 and 1979, he was responsible for hosting the Miss Brazil pageant.

After a 30-year hiatus from drama, Marly Bueno resumed her artistic career in 1991, when Herval Rossano invited her to appear in the miniseries O Portador on TV Globo. In the same year, Manoel Carlos cast her in Felicidade. In Manoel Carlos' soap operas, she became known for playing refined, moralistic, and evil women, including Rafaela in História de Amor, Olivia, the Leblon resident in Laços de Família, the boss Marta Moretti in Mulheres Apaixonadas, and the Catholic nun Maria in Páginas da Vida.

In 2009, she moved to TV Record. At the network, she worked on the soap opera Poder Paralelo and played Ahinoam in the religious miniseries Rei Davi.

=== Death ===
Marly Bueno died at the age of 78 in Rio de Janeiro in 2012. She was admitted to Copa D'or Hospital in Copacabana due to an intestinal problem and contracted a hospital infection after undergoing emergency surgery. The actress was on the air with the miniseries Rei Davi. She was buried in her family's tomb at the Araçá Cemitery in São Paulo.

== Filmography ==
=== Television ===
Year	Title	Role	Notes
1950–52	TV na Taba	Spokesgirl	
1953	As Aventuras de Berloque Kolmes	Jane Calamidade	
1953–59	TV de Vanguarda	Various roles	
1954	O Falcão Negro	Lucrécia Borgia	
1955	A Sogra que Deus me Deu	Angélica	
1956	Aponte o Culpado	Bárbara	Episode: "Um Pequeno Vício"
1956	O Conde de Monte Cristo	Mercedes	
1956	Scaramouche	Maria Helena	
1957	Lever no Espaço	Carmem	
1958	TV Teatro Walita	Ana	Episode: "Champagne em Mesa Alheia"
1958	TV Teatro Walita		Episode: "O Macarone"
1958	TV de Comédia	Alice	Episode: "O Pivete"
1958	TV de Comédia	Úrsula	Episode: "Feitiço"
1959	Um Lugar ao Sol	Natália	
1960–61	Alô, Doçura!	Anita	
1976	Estúpido Cupido	Miss Brazil pageant host	Special appearance
1991	O Portador	Edite	
1991	Felicidade	Leonor	
1993	Agosto	Modista	
1994	Quatro por Quatro	Mônica Sales	
1995	História de Amor	Rafaela Moretti	
1996	Salsa e Merengue	Sandra	Episode: "12 de dezembro"
1998	Estrela de Fogo	Yolanda	
2000	Laços de Família	Olívia Martins	
2002	Coração de Estudante	Zuleide Andrade (Zuzu)	
2003	Mulheres Apaixonadas	Marta Gonzaga Moretti	
2004	Um Só Coração	Lúcia	
2004	Linha Direta	Clotilde Elejalde de Mello Vianna	Episode: "Crime das Irmãs Poni"
2005	América	Mrs. Mattos	Episode: "20 de junho"
2005	Os Amadores	Necilda	Episode: "1"
2006	Páginas da Vida	Maria Gomes (Sister Maria / Sister Má)	
2009	Poder Paralelo	Sônia Meira	
2012	Rei Davi	Ainoã	

=== Cinema ===
Year	Movie	Character
1953	The Lero-Lero Family	
1954	Na Senda do Crime	Maria
1957	Dorinha no Soçaite	Ester
1958	Chão Bruto	Laura
1961	Entre Mulheres e Espiões	Kátia
1962	As Sete Evas	Lídia
1995	Sombras de Julho	Ione
1999	Oriundi	Matilde
2006	Fica Comigo Esta Noite	Laura's mother
2007	Inesquecível	Norma
2009	A Mulher Invisível	Elderly woman at the cinema

=== Theater ===
Year	Play	Character	Playwright	Director	Theater	Ref.
1954	O Empréstimo		Clô Prado	Antunes Filho	Theater Leopoldo Fróes, São Paulo, São Paulo	
1954	A Filha de Iório		Gabriele D'Annunzio	Ruggero Jacobbi	Teatro Cultura Artística, São Paulo, São Paulo	
2011	O Pacto das 3 Meninas	Vera		Ernesto Piccolo	Theater Clara Nunes, Rio de Janeiro, Rio de Janeiro	
