= Betty Gofman =

Brazilian actress

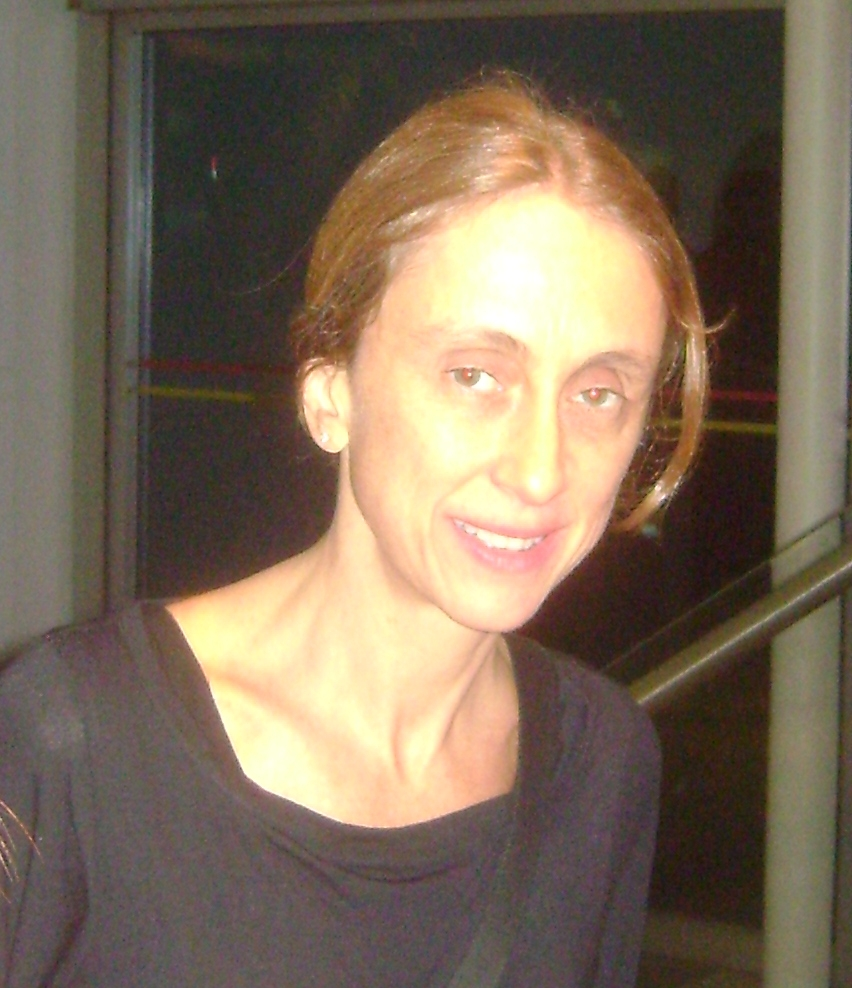
- Betty Gofman in A Vingança do Espelho: a História de Zezé Macedo.
- Born: 3 June 1965 (age 61); São Paulo
- Occupation: Actress
- Parent: Eny Léa Gass (mother)
- Relatives: Rosane Gofman (older sister)

Betty Gofman (Rio de Janeiro, June 3, 1965) is a Brazilian stage, film, and television actress. Descended from Russian-Austrian Jews, she is married to philosopher Hugo Barreto, with whom she has two daughters, the twins Alice and Helena, and she is the sister of actress Rosane (Roxanne) Gofman.

== Early years ==
Gofman was born in Rio de Janeiro. Her dream as a child was to be a veterinarian, and a protector of animals. With a theatrical training background, Gofman studied with Maria Clara Machado, and at Casa de Arte das Laranjeiras.

== Career ==
When her sister, Roxanne, pursued an artistic career as an actress, Gofman decided to follow suit. She was only 20 years old when she was cast in the first version of the soap opera Ti Ti Ti (1985), and gained prominence with her character Monique in Selva de Pedra. Irreverent, she often performed in comedy roles. In Caminho das Índias, another soap opera on Brazilian TV, she made the audience laugh with her bumbling character Dayse. She participated in several soap operas and mini-series, among them Um Só Coração, produced by Rede Globo, where she played the painter Anita Malfatti. She also played a character in Cortina de Vidro by Walcyr Carrasco.

Her film debut was in Roberto Gervitz's Feliz Ano Velho released in 1987. She joined Bia Lessa's theatrical company and took part in several international theater festivals. Directed by Lessa, she acted in Everyday, based on the novel by Virginia Woolf, Ibsen's Casa de Bonecas, A Megera Domada, and Orlando.

== Personal life ==
By the end of the 1980s, she was in a relationship with musician Marcelo Fromer.

== Filmography ==
=== Television ===
- 1985 - Ti Ti Ti
- 1987 - Direito de Amar
- 1989 - Que Rei Sou Eu?
- 1989 - Cortina de Vidro
- 1991 - O Dono do Mundo
- 1995 - Engraçadinha... Seus Amores e Seus Pecados
- 1995 - Decadência
- 1996 - A Comédia da Vida Privada
- 1999 - Vila Madalena
- 2000 - Garotas do Programa
- 2001 - Os Normais
- 2001 - Sai de Baixo
- 2002 - O Beijo do Vampiro
- 2002 - Desejos de Mulher
- 2004 - Celebridade
- 2004 - Começar de Novo
- 2004 - Um Só Coração
- 2005 - Sob Nova Direção
- 2005 - América
- 2006 - A Diarista
- 2006 - JK
- 2007 - O Sistema
- 2007 - Amazônia, de Galvez a Chico Mendes
- 2008 - Casos e Acasos
- 2009 - Caminho das Índias
- 2010 - Ti Ti Ti
- 2012 - Salve Jorge.
- 2014 - Em Família
- 2015 - Escolinha do Professor Raimundo
- 2016 - Haja Coração
- 2017 - A Força do Querer
- 2018 - Deus Salve o Rei
- 2019 - Órfãos da Terra
- 2021 - Um Lugar ao Sol

=== Films ===
- 1987 - Os Trapalhões no Auto da Compadecida
- 1987 - Feliz Ano Velho
- 1989 - Kuarup
- 1994 - Boca
- 1999 - Até que a Vida nos Separe
- 2000 - Cronicamente Inviável
- 2000 - Amélia
- 2003 - Viva Voz
- 2003 - Oswaldo Cruz - O Médico do Brasil
- 2003 - Eclipse.

=== Theater ===
- Orlando
- A Megera Domada
- Casa de Bonecas
- Cotidiano.
- A Vingança do Espelho: A história de Zezé Macedo
