= Salsa e Merengue =

- Genre: Telenovela
- Created by: Miguel Falabella and Maria Carmem Barbosa
- Directed by: Wolf Maya
- Starring: Patrícia França; Marcos Palmeira; Marcello Antony; Débora Bloch; Cristiana Oliveira; Arlete Salles; Victor Fasano; Rosamaria Murtinho; Laura Cardoso; Bia Nunnes; Ariclê Perez; José D'Artagnan Júnior; Thaís de Campos; Zezé Polessa; Adriana Garambone; Gabriela Alves; Alexandre Barillari; Maria Maya
- Opening theme: "María" by Ricky Martin
- Country of origin: Brazil
- Original language: Portuguese
- No. of episodes: 185

Production
- Running time: 45 minutes

Original release
- Network: TV Globo
- Release: September 30, 1996 – May 2, 1997

Salsa e Merengue is a Brazilian telenovela produced and broadcast at the 7pm timeslot by TV Globo, from September 30, 1996 to May 2, 1997, in 185 episodes.

It is written by Miguel Falabella and Maria Carmem Barbosa, with text supervision of Gilberto Braga and directed by Wolf Maya.

The telenovela stars Patrícia França, Marcos Palmeira, Marcello Antony, Débora Bloch, Victor Fasano, Laura Cardoso, Arlete Salles, Bia Nunnes, José D'Artagnan Júnior, Rosamaria Murtinho, Walmor Chagas and Cristiana Oliveira in the main roles.

== Plot ==
A rich woman named Bárbara gives birth to a dead child, however without her knowledge, her husband Guilherme exchanges the child's body for a baby whose mother is poor and cannot afford to raise the child. 30 years later, Eugênio, the exchanged child, develops leukemia and is in need of an urgent marrow transplant. The donation of a blood relative is required for the surgery and with the risk of his son dying, Guilherme tells Bárbara about the exchange. The two go in search of Anabel Muñoz, Eugênio’s birth mother.

Anabel never told anyone about the pregnancy, but never forgot the son she had with Urbano. Anabel later met her late husband Félix Munõz, with whom she had five other children: Valentim, Remédios, Amparo, Assunção, and Antônio. With Eugênio’s reappearance in her life, Anabel is forced reveal the truth. Eugênio, who thought he was the son of millionaires, discovers that his real family is poor. The tests show that Anabel’s bone marrow is incompatible with Eugênio. Because of this, Anabel reveals another secret: Valentim is also Urbano's son. Valentim is faced with the situation of having to donate bone marrow for a brother he doesn’t know. To make matters worse, Eugene and Valentim fall in love with the same woman, Madalena.

== Cast ==
- Patrícia França as Madalena Sobral
- Marcos Palmeira as Valentim Muñoz
- Marcello Antony as Eugênio Amarante Paes
- Cristiana Oliveira as Adriana Campos Queiroz
- Arlete Salles as Anabel Muñoz
- Zezé Polessa as Marinelza Bolla
- Laura Cardoso as Ruth Campos Queiroz
- Cláudio Cavalcanti as Dr. Olavo
- Ariclê Perez as Gilda Campos Queiroz
- Bia Nunnes as Remédios Muñoz
- Thaís de Campos as Amparo Muñoz
- Gabriela Alves as Assunção Muñoz
- Diogo Vilela as Caio Graco Leão
- Rosi Campos as Dayse Menezes
- André Gonçalves as Walter
- Maria Maya as Caroline "Kelly" Bolla
- Juliana Baroni as Inês Soares da Cunha
- Ricardo Petraglia as Tito Soares da Cunha
- Mônica Torres as Lídia
- Jacqueline Laurence as Eglantine Billard
- Stella Miranda as Maria do Socorro
- Marcos Oliveira as Cândido "Candinho"
- Ademir Zanyor Jair "Jairzinho" Billard
- Estelita Bell as Imaculada Muñoz
- Maria Lúcia Dahl as Laís Soares da Cunha
- José D'Artagnan Júnior as Edgar
- Chico Díaz as Ramiro Morales
- Maria Gladys as Neném
- Luís Salém as Lázaro
- Angela Rebello as Tereza
- Regiana Antonini as Deusa
- Mara Manzan as Sexta-Feira
- Alexandre Barillari as Antônio Muñoz
- Adriana Garambone as Clarice Amarante Paes
- Johnny Rudge as Moacir "Moa" Menezes
- Bruno Murtinho as Wellington
- Zezeh Barbosa as Jacinta
- Vanessa Dantas as Flávia
- Adriano Garib as Juarez
- Débora Bloch as Teodora Bentes do Gama
- Victor Fasano as Heitor Lobato
- Marcos Paulo as Gaspar Junqueira
- Nelson Xavier as Mestre Bento Sobral
- Marly Bueno as Sandra

=== Special guest stars ===
- Rosamaria Murtinho as Bárbara Amarante Paes
- Walmor Chagas as Guilherme Amarante Paes
- Oswaldo Loureiro as Walmir Bolla

== Production ==
Salsa e Merengue is the first telenovela written by the duo Maria Carmem Barbosa and Miguel Falabella. In order to be able to write the telenovela with ease, Falabella took a month's leave from the comedy show Sai de Baixo. The telenovela had around forty scenes shot in Miami, with the cost of filming being around 300 thousand dollars.

In the first few weeks, the telenovela aired a topless scene at 7 pm. The scene was made at the request of the production team.

The opening credits sequence showed people dancing to the rhythm of salsa and merengue, to the song María by Ricky Martin, which was a hit at the time. Meanwhile, a complementary soundtrack, Bailando Salsa e Merengue, was released containing the songs featured in the telenovela.
