= Laura Cardoso =

Brazilian actress (1927–2026)

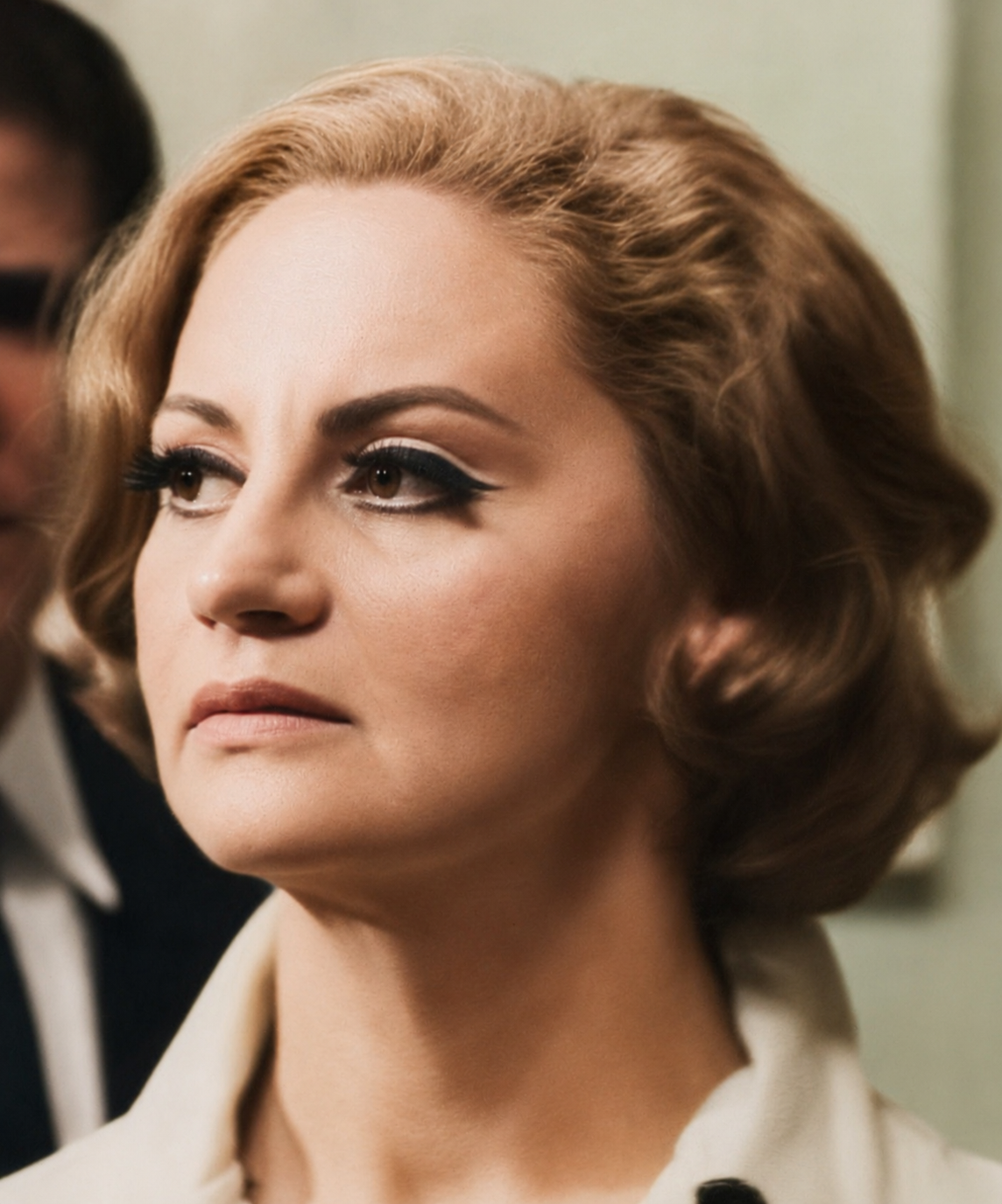
- Cardoso in 1968
- Born: Laurinda de Jesus Cardoso; 13 September 1927; São Paulo, Brazil
- Died: 17 August 2026 (aged 98); São Paulo, Brazil
- Occupation: Actress
- Years active: 1944–2025
- Spouse: Fernando Balleroni (m. 1949; died 1980)
- Children: 3

Laurinda de Jesus Balleroni (née Cardoso; 13 September 1927 – 17 August 2026), known professionally as Laura Cardoso, was a Brazilian actress. Regarded as a grande dame of Brazilian drama, she was a pioneer of television, working in the medium from its launch in 1950. She appeared in more than 100 telenovelas and received numerous awards, including three Grande Otelo Awards, five APCA Awards, two Shell Awards and two Troféu Imprensa Awards. In 2006, she was awarded the Order of Cultural Merit for her contribution to Brazilian culture.

Cardoso began her career in radio in the 1940s before moving to television in the 1950s, becoming one of the early performers on TV Tupi. She made her telenovela debut in 1958 in Os Miseráveis and subsequently worked for Brazil's major broadcasters, including Band, TV Cultura, Record and Globo, where she remained from 1983. She also had a distinguished stage career, winning two Shell Awards for Best Actress. Across more than seven decades, she became known for her versatility and for portraying characters in productions including Felicidade, Mundo da Lua, Mulheres de Areia, A Viagem, Chocolate com Pimenta and Caminho das Índias.

== Early life ==
Laurinda de Jesus Cardoso was born in São Paulo, the daughter of Portuguese immigrants. At first, her parents resisted her career goals. But by the age of 15, she was determined to be a professional actress in radionovelas in Radio Cosmos.

== Career ==
Still young, Cardoso made her debut in the Tupi TV show Tribunal do Coração (1952). She participated in telenovelas such as Um Lugar ao Sol (1959) by Dionísio Azevedo (an adaptation of Theodore Dreiser's novel An American Tragedy) and Ídolo de Pano (1975) by Teixeira Filho. At the same time, Cardoso also worked at TV Excelsior, RecordTV and TV Cultura. In the 1960s, she also worked as voice actress, dubbing the character Betty Rubble into Portuguese in the animated series The Flintstones.

After two years dedicated to the theater, in 1981, she was invited by Globo to integrate the cast of Gilberto Braga's telenovela Brilhante.

In 1982, she starred in Ninho da Serpente and Renúncia aired by TV Bandeirantes. Back in the Globo TV, Cardoso appeared in three Walther Negrão's telenovelas: Pão-Pão, Beijo-Beijo (1983), Livre para Voar (1984) and Fera Radical (1988). After that, she made Silvio de Abreu's Rainha da Sucata (1990), and Manoel Carlos's Felicidade (1991), and three remakes of very successful telenovelas, two by Ivani Ribeiro, Mulheres de Areia (1993) and A Viagem (1994).

In 1995, Cardoso appeared in Irmãos Coragem and Gloria Perez's Explode Coração, the first telenovela filmed in Projac (today Estúdios Globo). In 1998, Cardoso starred in Vila Madalena, and after a brief passage in RecordTV, where she appeared in Marcos Lazarini's Vidas Cruzadas (2000), she returned to Globo to star in Walcyr Carrasco's A Padroeira in 2001.

Cardoso then appeared as Madalena in Esperança (2002), and in 2003 as Carmen in Chocolate com Pimenta.

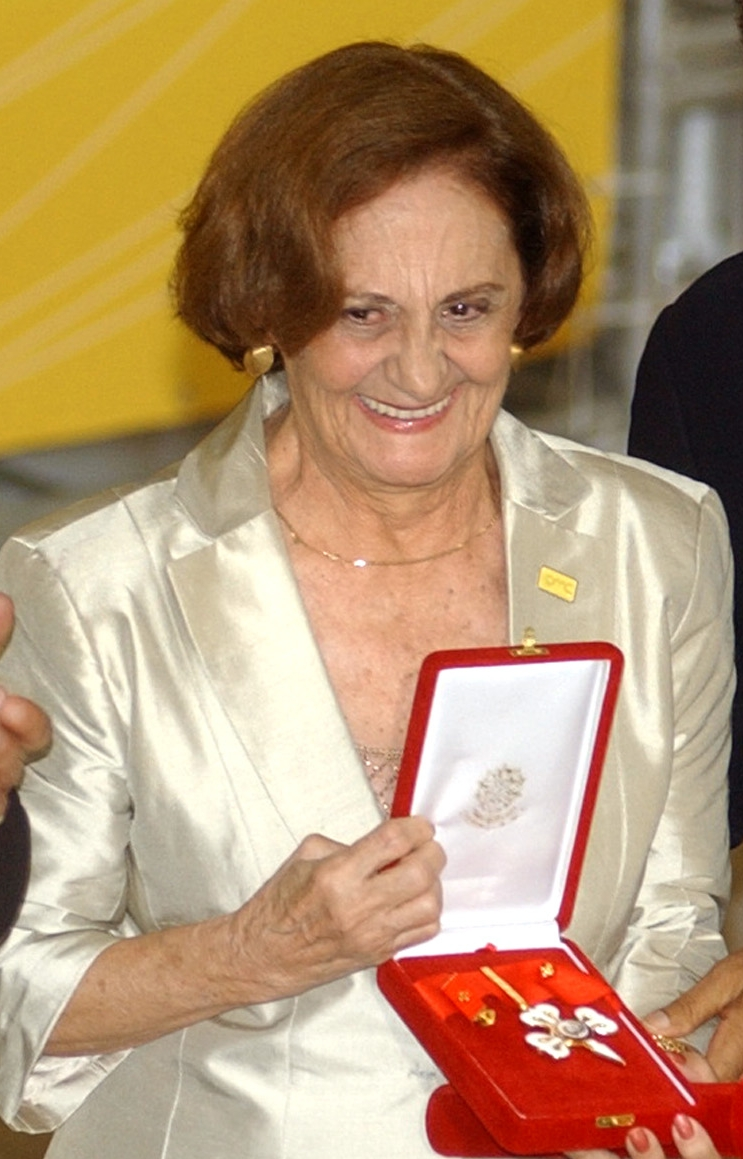
Cardoso receiving the Order of Cultural Merit, from the Ministry of Culture in 2006

In 2005, she appeared in the mini-series Hoje É Dia de Maria, Cardoso also participated in the cast of O Profeta (2006), and in Aguinaldo Silva's Duas Caras (2007). In Caminho das Índias (2009) she played the Indian Laksmi Ananda.

In 2010 she played Mariquita in Araguaia. In 2012, she starred in the role of Dorotéia, in the remake of Gabriela, an adaptation of Jorge Amado's novel, written by Walcyr Carrasco.

In 2014, she appeared in three productions of Globo: in the television series Segunda Dama and in the telenovelas Império and Boogie Oogie.

On 26 April 2024, Laura Cardoso won a Special Tribute on the Globoplay streaming service in Brazil.

== Death ==
Cardoso died in São Paulo on 17 August 2026, at the age of 98.

== Filmography ==
- 1964 – Imitando o Sol
- 1964 – O Rei Pelé
- 1965 – Quatro Brasileiros em Paris
- 1969 – Corisco, O Diabo Loiro
- 1976 – Já Não Se Faz Amor Como Antigamente
- 1977 – Tiradentes, O Mártir da Independência
- 1979 – Gaivotas
- 1980 – Ariella
- 1982 – Um Casal de Três .... Shirley
- 1987 – Quincas Borba
- 1988 – Adultério (short film)
- 1988 – Fera Radical
- 1989 – Lua Cheia
- 1990 – Rainha da Sucata .... Iolanda Maia
- 1991 – Felicidade .... Cândida Peixoto
- 1993 – Mulheres de Areia .... Isaura
- 1994 – A Viagem .... Dona Guiomar
- 1995 – Irmãos Coragem .... Sinhana
- 1995 – Terra Estrangeira .... Manuela
- 1995 – Explode Coração .... Soraya
- 1996 – Salsa e Merengue .... Ruth Campos Queiroz
- 1998 – Uma Aventura do Zico
- 1998 – Meu Bem Querer .... Yeda Ferreira de Souza
- 1999 – Vila Madalena .... Deolinda Xavier
- 2000 – Através da janela .... Selma
- 2001 – Copacabana .... Selma
- 2001 – A Padroeira .... Silvana
- 2002 – No Bar
- 2002 – Morte
- 2002 – Esperança
- 2003 – Chocolate com Pimenta
- 2004 – Como uma Onda
- 2004 – Sob Nova Direção .... Madre Superiora
- 2005 – Hoje É Dia de Maria .... Narrator
- 2006 – Belíssima .... Woman (cameo)
- 2006 – O Profeta .... Abigail
- 2007 – Desejo Proibido .... Sebastiana (cameo)
- 2007 – Duas Caras .... Alice (cameo)
- 2008 – Ciranda de Pedra .... Prosópia (cameo)
- 2009 – India – A Love Story .... Laksmi Ananda
- 2010 – Araguaia .... Mariquita
- 2011 – A Grande Família .... Glória Rosa e Silva
- 2012 – Gabriela .... Doroteia
- 2013 – Pé na Cova
- 2013 – Flor do Caribe
- 2014 – Império
- 2016 – Sol Nascente
- 2017 – O Outro Lado do Paraíso
- 2019 – A Dona do Pedaço
