= Maria Alves (actress) =

Brazilian actress

- Born: November 7, 1947; Lagarto, Sergipe
- Died: May 8, 2008 (aged 60); Rio de Janeiro
- Other names: Mariadealves, Maria DeAlves, Maria Alvez
- Occupation: Actress

Maria Alves (7 November 1947 – 8 May 2008) was a Brazilian actress.

== Television ==
- 1970 - "Irmãos Coragem" - Salete
- 1979 - "Plantão de Polícia" - Odete
- 1979 - "Marron Glacê" - Bizuca
- 1981 - "Baila Comigo" - Conceição - for this work she received the Golden Support Award from Artur da Távola
- 1982 - "Lampião e Maria Bonita" - Mabel
- 1982 - "Sol de Verão" - Matilde
- 1983 - "Voltei pra você" - Paciência
- 1984 - "Vereda Tropical" - Namorada de Bepe
- 1985 - "Tenda dos Milagres" (mini-series)
- 1985 - "O Tempo e o Vento" (mini-series)
- 1986 - "Selva de Pedra" - Maria
- 1987 - "Mandala" - Carmem
- 1989 - "Kananga do Japão" (Rede Manchete) - Isaura
- 1990 - "Rosa dos Rumos" (Rede Manchete) - Maurina
- 1991 - "Na rede de intrigas" (Rede Manchete)
- 1991 - "Felicidade" - Maria
- 1994 - "A Viagem" - Francisca
- 1995 - "História de Amor" - Nazaré
- 1996 - "Xica da Silva" (Rede Manchete) - Rosa
- 1997 - "Por Amor" - Maria
- 1998 - "A Turma do Pererê" (TVE Brasil/TV Cultura)
- 1999 - "Louca Paixão" (Rede Record) - Iracema Rangel
- 2001 - "As filhas da mãe" - Jussara
- 2006 - "Um Menino Muito Maluquinho" (TV Cultura) - Marinês

== Films ==
- 1964 - Lana, Rainha das Amazonas
- 1975 - A Extorsão
- 1976 - Perdida - nominated for Best Supporting Actress by the Associação Paulista de Críticos de Arte
- 1977 - Gente Fina É Outra Coisa
- 1977 - O Jogo da Vida
- 1978 - Coronel Delmiro Gouveia
- 1978 - O Cortiço
- 1978 - Se Segura, Malandro! .... Marilu
- 1979 - Gargalhada Final
- 1979 - O Bom Burguês
- 1981 - A Mulher Sensual
- 1981 - O Sequestro
- 1984 - Noites do Sertão
- 1984 - Para Viver um Grande Amor
- 1985 - Fonte da Saudade
- 1987 - La Via dura
- 1987 - Romance da Empregada
- 1991 - A Grande Arte
- 1991 - Dèmoni 3
- 1991 - Vai Trabalhar, Vagabundo II
- 1995 - Sombras de Julho
- 1996 - O Lado Certo da Vida Errada
- 1999 - Mauá - O Imperador e o Rei
- 2001 - Elisa - short film which she directed, wrote and acted
- 2002 - Ator Profissão Amor - Directed, wrote and acted. This film was selected for the BR 2003 Festival and to be exhibited at the Bibliothèque nationale de France at the France / Brazil 2005 event
- 2006 - Sólo Dios Sabe

== Theatre ==
- Gota d'Água (musical)
- Ópera do Malandro (musical)
