= Letícia Sabatella =

Brazilian actress and singer (born 1971)

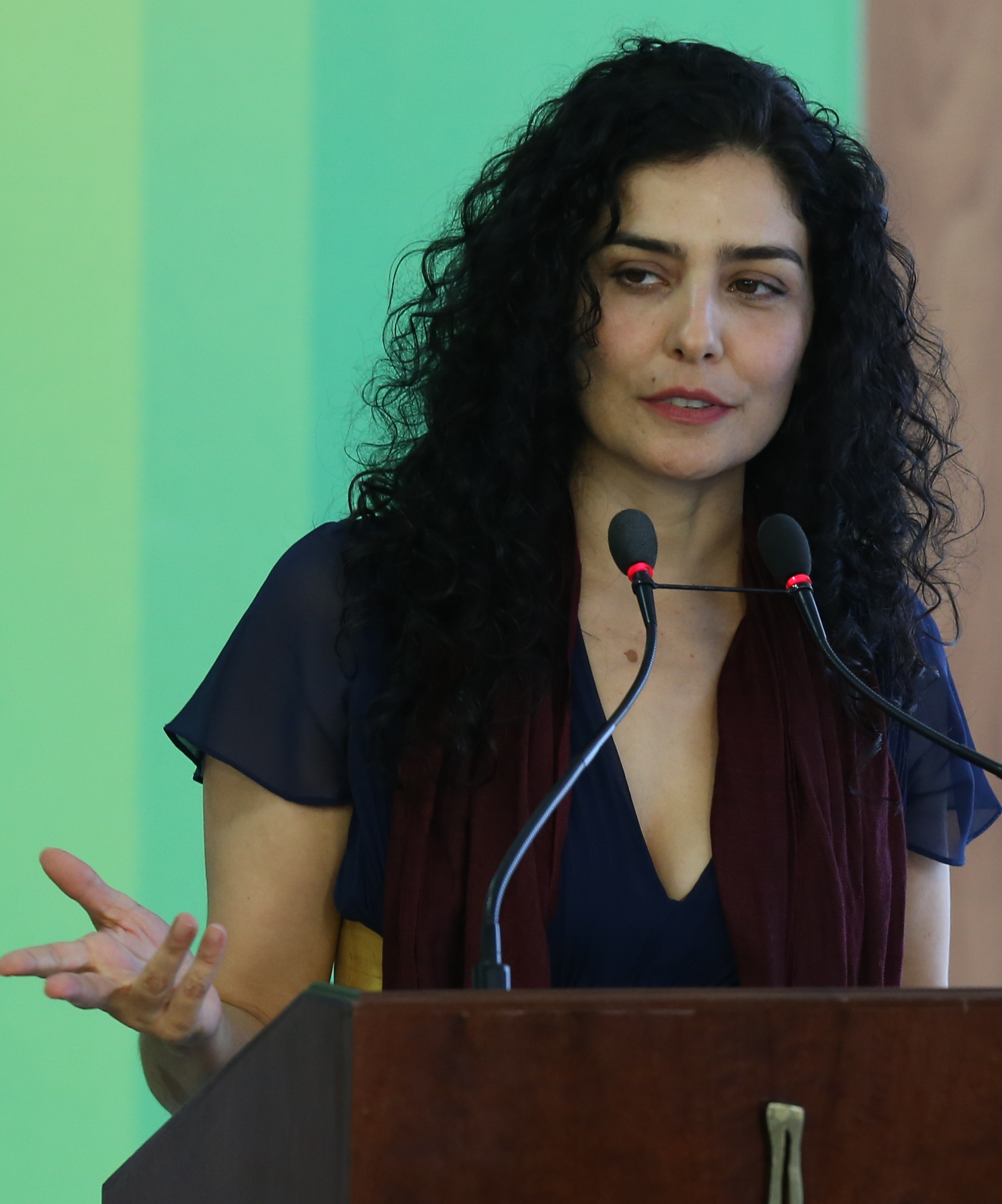
- Sabatella in 2016
- Born: 8 March 1971 (age 55); Belo Horizonte, Minas Gerais, Brazil
- Occupations: Actress, singer
- Years active: 1991–present
- Spouses: Ângelo Antônio (m. 1991; div. 2003) Fernando Alves Pinto (m. 2013; div. 2019)
- Children: 1

Letícia Sabatella (born 8 March 1971) is a Brazilian actress and singer.

== Early life and career ==
Born in Belo Horizonte, Letícia Sabatella was two years old when her family moved from Itajubá (MG) to the mining town of Conceição das Alagoas, going live in the village of Volta Grande Power Plant. There her father worked as an engineer. She has said she learned to appreciate nature in this place full of greenery and people of different nationalities. Today, she lives in Nova Friburgo, a mountainous region of Rio de Janeiro, where she grows organic food cooperative arrangements with employees.

Her political consciousness emerged early in life and was reinforced by the company of people like Frei Betto and Herbert de Souza, who showed her the importance of using her celebrity for something more than making money. Her engagement has become so strong that she went on to live with indigenous people craós (Tocantins) as one of them, and to camp with members of the Landless Workers' Movement to understand their proposals. In addition, she participates in several organizations, is a constant presence in forums, and raises her voice in defense of human rights and the environment. On December 8, 2007, she was in Sobradinho, Bahia, visiting the bishop of Barra, Dom Luiz Flávio Cappio, at San Francisco. The bishop was on a hunger strike for the second time, the first in Cabrobó, Pernambuco, in protest against the transposition of the São Francisco River. Sabatella is part of the non-governmental organization Human Rights Movement.

Her experience with the Indians led her to start a career as a filmmaker. In 2008, she launched the documentary Hotxuá.

In 2009, she played a cruel Yvone in the soap opera India – A Love Story by Glória Perez. In 2012, she it was confirmed that she would star in the movie The Mother War, a foreign film that will have its co-production between the United States and Italy, in which she will play the warrior Anita Garibaldi.

In 2013, she returned to the telenovela in Sangue Bom, in which interpreted Verônica. In 2014, she joined the cast of Sessão de Terapia, playing Bianca Cadore, a professor of literature who seeks therapy to save her marriage to her husband, Tadeu.

== Personal life ==
On 16 December the same year, Sabatella married the actor Fernando Alves Pinto in São Paulo, after two years of dating, in an intimate ceremony for 350 guests. She is a vegetarian. In 2023, Sabatella disclosed that she had been diagnosed with autism.

== Career ==
=== Television ===
Year	Title	Role	Notes
1991	Caso Especial	Rita	Episode: "Os Homens Querem Paz"
1991	O Dono do Mundo	Thaís Arruda Camargo	
1993	Agosto	Salete	
1994	74.5 - Uma Onda no Ar	Luíza Trench	
1995	Irmãos Coragem	Maria de Lara Barros / Diana / Márcia	
1996	Caça Talentos	Flora	
1996	Você Decide	Bárbara	Episode: "Testemunha de Acusação"
1998	Torre de Babel	Celeste Leme Toledo	
1999	A Turma do Pererê		
1999	Você Decide		Episode: "Trio em Lá Menor"
2000	A Muralha	Ana Cardoso	
2001	Os Maias		Participation
2001	Porto dos Milagres	Arlete Palmeirão	First phase
2001	O Clone	Latiffa Rachid	
2004	Um Só Coração	Maria Luísa Sousa Borba	
2005	Hoje É Dia de Maria	Maria	
2005	Tecendo o Saber	Marília	Episode: "A Cadeirante"
2005	Hoje É Dia de Maria 2	Alonsa / Rosicler / Asmodeia	
2006	JK	Marisa Soares	
2006	Páginas da Vida	Sister Lavínia Resston	
2007	Desejo Proibido	Ana Fernandes	
2008	Som Brasil	Presenter	
2009	Caminho das Índias	Yvone Magalhães	
2010	Afinal, o Que Querem as Mulheres?	Flanneur	
2012	As Brasileiras	Monique	Episode: "A Apaixonada de Niterói"
2012	Guerra dos Sexos	Angelina	Special participation
2013	Sangue Bom	Verônica Vasquez / Palmira Valente	
2014	Sessão de Terapia	Bianca Cadore	
2017	Tempo de Amar	Delfina Leitão	
2019	Órfãos da Terra	Soraia Anssarah Abdallah	
2020	Night on Earth	Narrator (Portuguese version)	
2021	Nos Tempos do Imperador	Teresa Cristina de Bragança, Empress of Brazil	

=== Film ===
Year	Title	Role	Notes
1994	Dente por Dente		Short film
1997	Decisão	Laura	Short film
1998	Bela Donna	Dona Benta	
1999	O Tronco	Anastácia	
2001	O Xangô de Baker Street	Esperidiana	
2002	Durval Discos	Célia	
2003	Chatô, O Rei do Brasil		
2006	Vestido de Noiva	Lúcia	
2007	Não por Acaso	Lúcia	
2008	Romance	Ana	
2008	Hotxuá	Director	
2009	Flordelis - Basta uma Palavra para Mudar	Eliane	
2010	Chico Xavier	Maria	
2010	Amazônia Caruana	Zezé	
2011	Circular	Cristina	
2013	The Mother War	Anita Garibaldi	
2019	Happy Hour	Vera	
