= Flordelis: Basta uma Palavra para Mudar =

2009 film

Flordelis: Basta uma Palavra para Mudar (English: "Flordelis: A word suffices to change") is a 2009 Brazilian film based on the life of gospel singer and politician Flordelis.

== Plot ==
Based on a true story, the film depicts the life of Flordelis, an evangelical resident of the Jacarezinho slum in Rio de Janeiro, who adopted 37 children and has faced various challenges.

== Cast ==
- Bruna Marquezine as Rayane
- Reynaldo Gianecchini
- Letícia Sabatella
- Patrícia França
- Deborah Secco
- Marcello Antony as Anderson do Carmo
- Letícia Spiller
- Cauã Reymond
- Alinne Moraes
- Fernanda Lima
- Rodrigo Hilbert
- Ana Furtado
- Fernanda Machado
- Sérgio Marone
- Giselle Itié
- Thiago Martins
- Carolina Oliveira
- Júlia Mattos
- Graziella Schmitt
- Guilherme Berenguer
- Pedro Neschling
- Thiago Rodrigues
- Cris Vianna
- Isabel Fillardis
- Alexandre Zacchia
- Eduardo Galvão
- Roumer Canhães
- Erik Marmo
- Raphael Louzada
