= Zezé Polessa =

Brazilian actress

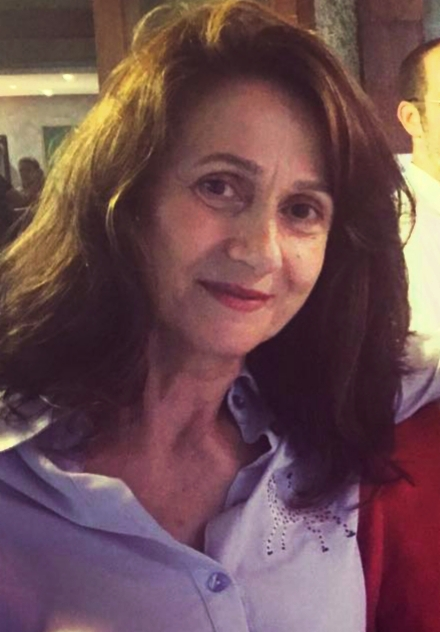
- Polessa in 2020
- Born: Maria José de Castro Polessa; 22 September 1953 (age 72); Rio de Janeiro, Brazil
- Occupation: Actress
- Years active: 1973–present
- Spouses: Daniel Dantas (m. 1979; div. 1988) Paulo José (m. 1989; div. 1997)
- Children: 1

Maria José de Castro Polessa (born 22 September 1953), known professionally as Zezé Polessa, is a Brazilian actress.

== Biography ==
Polessa was born in Rio de Janeiro. She graduated in Medicine from the Faculty of Medicine of the Federal University of Rio de Janeiro in 1977 and she graduated in social medicine, but she changed her profession to that of an actress. She was married to actor Daniel Dantas, father of her only son: João. She later married actor Paulo José.

== Filmography ==
=== Television ===
Year	Title	Character	Notes
1978	Dancin' Days	Berrita	Participação
1984	Partido Alto	Amapola	
1985	Tudo em Cima	Clara	
1985	Tamanho Família	Duda	
1988	Grupo Escolacho		
1989	Top Model	Anastácia Passos (Naná)	
1991	Vamp	Sílvia Sousa	
1991	Doris para Maiores	Ela mesma	
1991	O Portador	Vilma	
1992	As Noivas de Copacabana	Mariana França	
1992 1993 1994 1995	Você Decide		Episódio: "Prova Final" Episódio: "Escrito nas Estrelas" Episódio: "Cinderela" Episódio: "Branca de Neve"
1994	Memorial de Maria Moura	Firma	
1995	Decadência	Jandira	
1995	Explode Coração	Mila Tolentino	
1996	Salsa e Merengue	Marinelza Bolla	
1998	Hilda Furacão	Dona Neném	
1998	Sai de Baixo	Lola Antibes	Episódio: "Um Conde Chamado Desejo"
1998 1998 1999 2000	Você Decide	Marina / Marlene	Episódio: "O Flagrante" Episódio: "O Rapto da Sogra" Episódio: "Forró Bandido" Episódio: "Vício de Matar"
1999	Andando nas Nuvens	Bonitona	
2000	Garotas do Programa	Vários personagens	
2001	Porto dos Milagres	Amapola Ferraço	
2002	Sítio do Picapau Amarelo	Aranha Secretária	Episódio: "Convenção das Bruxas" Episódio: "Bruxa Mãe... Bruxa Filha"
2002	Os Normais	Cibele	Episódio: "Sensações Normais"
2002	Brava Gente	Francelina	Episódio: "A Casa Errada"
2003	Agora É que São Elas	Tintim	
2003	Linha Direta	Zuzu Angel	Episódio: "O Caso Zuzu Angel"
2004	Sob Nova Direção	Maria Antônia	Episódio: "O Casamento do Meu Melhor Inimigo"
2004	Carga Pesada	Gabriela	Episódio: "E Agora, Companheiros?"
2005	A Lua Me Disse	Ester Bogari Prado (Dionísia Ferraz)	
2006	Dom	Teresa	Especial de fim de ano
2007	O Sistema	Valquíria	
2007	Amazônia, de Galvez a Chico Mendes	Justine	
2008	Beleza Pura	Ivete Santos	
2009	Toma Lá, Dá Cá	Harolda Neves	Episódio: "Cada Macaco no Seu Galho" Episódio: "Por Causa da Maionese"
2010	Escrito nas Estrelas	Sofia Tavares Miranda	
2011	O Bem-Amado	Dorotea Cajazeira	
2011	Cordel Encantado	Maria Bem-Aventurada da Ternura; Guerra Peixoto (Ternurinha)	
2012	Salve Jorge	Berna Ayata	
2014	Império	Magnólia Teixeira da Silva	
2016	Liberdade, Liberdade	Ascensão Tereza de Lajedo	
2017	A Força do Querer	Edinalva Ferreira	
2018	O Sétimo Guardião	Milu Negromonte	
2023	Amor Perfeito	Cândida Evaristo	

=== Film ===
Year	Title	Role	Note
1987	Romance da Empregada		
1993	O Coringa		Curta-metragem
1996	Cheque-Mate		Curta-metragem
1997	Doces Poderes	Jornalista de Brasília	
1997	Dedicatórias	Viúva	Curta-metragem
2001	Bufo &amp; Spallanzani	Zilda	
2003	As Alegres Comadres	Mrs. Lima	
2005	Manual Para Atropelar Cachorro	Madá	Curta-metragem
2005	Gaijin – Ama-me como sou	Gina Salinas	
2005	Achados e Perdidos	Magali	
2007	Caixa Dois	Angelina	
2010	O Bem Amado	Dorotea Cajazeira	
2014	Irmã Dulce	Dulcinha	
2015	Chatô, o Rei do Brasil	Germana de Almeida	
2016	Desculpe o Transtorno	Dona Yvonne	
2016	O Amor no Divã	Malka Stein	
2017	Minha Família Perfeita	Mãe de Fred	

== Stage plays ==
Year	Name
1973	Drácula
1974	Às Armas
1974	Os Infortúnios de Mimi Boaventura
1975	Os Peixes da Babilônia
1977	A Fabulosa História de Melão City
1977	Balaço Barco
1979	O Despertar da Primavera
1980	Chapeuzinho Amarelo
1982	Moço em Estado de Sítio
1982	Mabel Mabel
1983	O Círculo de Giz Caucasiano
1983	A Família Titanic
1983	Folias do Coração
1984	O Beijo no Asfalto
1986	El Grande de Coca Cola
1986	Rita Formiga
1987	Ensaio nº 4 – Os Possessos
1987	Jou Jou Balangandãs
1988	Noel Rosa – um Musical
1988	Delicadas Torturas
1992	A Mulher que Matou os Peixes
1993	Mephisto
1995	Lágrimas Amargas de um Guarda Chuva
1996	Florbela Espanca, a Bela do Alentejo
1998	O Submarino
2000	Crioula
2000	Os Monólogos da Vagina
2002	O Fantasma do Theatro
2004	Síndromes – Loucos como Nós
2006–09	Não Sou Feliz, Mas Tenho Marido
2013–14	Quem Tem Medo de Virginia Woolf?
