= Vila Madalena (TV series) =

- Genre: Telenovela
- Created by: Walther Negrão
- Creative director: Jorge Fernando
- Starring: Edson Celulari; Maitê Proença; Cristiana Oliveira; Herson Capri; Marcos Winter
- Opening theme: Various
- Country of origin: Brazil
- Original language: Portuguese
- No. of episodes: 155

Production
- Running time: 50 minutes

Original release
- Network: Rede Globo
- Release: November 8, 1999 – May 5, 2000

Vila Madalena is a Brazilian telenovela produced and broadcast at the 7pm timeslot by Rede Globo from November 8, 1999, to May 5, 2000, in 155 episodes.

The telenovela is written by Walther Negrão, with the collaboration of Thelma Guedes, Elizabeth Jhin, Júlio Fischer, Paulo Cursino, Vinícius Vianna and Ângela Carneiro. It is directed by Jorge Fernando, Roberto Naar, Fabrício Mamberti and Marcus Alvisi.

It stars Edson Celulari, Maitê Proença, Marcos Winter, Herson Capri and Cristiana Oliveira in the main roles.

The telenovela presented an unprecedented opening intro proposal, with a different song for each episode. The songs were those that composed the national soundtrack of the telenovela.

== Plot ==
Solano Xavier (Edson Celulari) is a man of humble origin who never had formal education. When he takes a job as a truck driver, he unknowingly transports smuggled goods during one of his trips and is sentenced to 17 years in prison. In prison, Solano becomes good friends with Roberto (Marcos Winter), an educated young man who is unjustly imprisoned for the death of a man. While defending his fiancée, Pilar (Cristiana Oliveira), from two thugs harassing her, Roberto accidentally kills one of them, running him over with a car during the fight. With Roberto's influence, Solano spends his time studying. After seven years, he is released from prison due to good behavior and goes to meet his wife and son, but discovers that Eugênia (Maitê Proença) has married his former boss, businessman Arthur Junqueira (Herson Capri), and that they have a daughter together. From then on, Solano has to fight to regain Eugênia's love.

== Cast ==
- Edson Celulari as Solano Xavier
- Maitê Proença as Eugênia Junqueira
- Cristiana Oliveira as Pilar Ramirez
- Herson Capri as Arthur Junqueira
- Marcos Winter as Roberto Lopes
- Carla Marins as Nancy Xavier
- Thierry Figueira as Hugo Lopes
- Yoná Magalhães as Abigail "Bibiana" Ramirez
- Ary Fontoura as Elpídio Menezes "Seu Menez"
- Rosamaria Murtinho as Margot Ramirez
- Laura Cardoso as Deolinda Xavier
- Flávio Migliaccio as Ângelo Xavier
- Luíza Tomé as Raquel
- Mário Gomes as Donato
- Betty Gofman as Auxiliadora "Lilica"
- Marcelo Faria as José Xavier "Zezito"
- Fernanda Rodrigues as Zuleika "Zu"
- José de Abreu as Viriato
- Nívea Maria as Adélia
- Oscar Magrini as Aricanduva
- Susana Werner as Beatriz "Bia"
- Rosi Campos as Marinalva
- Roberto Bataglin as Luiz
- Cissa Guimarães as Dalva
- José Augusto Branco as Dr. Meirelles
- Luísa Thiré as Nilda
- Bruno Giordano as Juarez Junqueira
- Sílvia Bandeira as Elvira
- Fernando Almeida as Alfredo
- Larissa Queiroz as Tamara
- Ana Furtado as Nina
- Élcio Romar as Valdir
- Roberto Frota as Valfredo
- Rejane Goulart as Mirtes
- Jonas Melloas Franco
- Hilda Rebello as Isaura
- Luciano Vianna as Fábio
- Yeda Dantas as Vanda
- Leandro Ribeiro as Badu
- Joana Limaverde as Marina
- Ricardo Pavão as Dr. Américo Novaes
- Lina Fróes as Jurema
- Murilo Elbas as Sardinha
- Daniel Marinho as Gustavo "Guga"
- Mônica Mattos as Leda
- Marcelo Barros as Formiga
- Kenya Costta as Joana
- Maria Carol Rebello as Vilma "Vilminha"
- Guilherme Vieira as Lucas Junqueira Xavier
- Nathalie Figueiredo as Laura

=== Guest stars ===
- Helena Fernandes as Luíza
- Antônio Abujamra as Frederico Fellini
- Fábio Junqueira as Bruno
- Marcelo Mansfield as Walmir
- Paula Manga as Gigi
- Juliana Martins as Carla
- Marcélia Cartaxo as Luciene
