= Monique Curi =

Brazilian actress (born 1969)

- Born: Monique Waller Curi; February 3, 1969 (age 56); Belo Horizonte, Minas Gerais, Brazil
- Occupation: Actress
- Children: 2

Monique Waller Curi (born February 3, 1969, in Belo Horizonte, Minas Gerais, Brazil) is a Brazilian actress.

== Career ==
=== Television ===
Year	Title	Role	Notes
1979	Os Gigantes	Paloma Gurgel (child)	Participation
1980	Marina	Soninha	
1981	Baila Comigo	Cristina Gomide (Cris)	
1982	Quem Ama não Mata	Ângela Meira	
1982	Sol de Verão	Glória (Glorinha)	
1984	Transas e Caretas	Lívia	
1991	Felicidade	Lídia de Sousa	
1995	História de Amor	Mariana Gomide Sampaio	
2000	Laços de Família	Antônia	
2012	Salve Jorge	Maria Helena (Lena)	
2014	Em Família	Telma	
2016	Haja Coração	Dulce Talarico	Episodes: "October 8–November 5, 2016"
2024	Família é Tudo	Doctor Dulce	Guest star
