= Paulo José =

Brazilian actor (1937–2021)

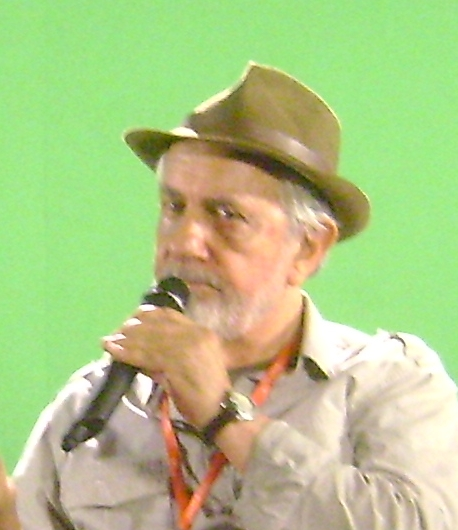
- Paulo José in 2011
- Born: Paulo José Gómez de Souza; 20 March 1937; Lavras do Sul, Rio Grande do Sul, Brazil
- Died: 11 August 2021 (aged 84); Rio de Janeiro, Brazil
- Occupation: Actor
- Years active: 1954–2018
- Spouses: Dina Sfat (divorced) Beth Caruso (divorced) Zezé Polessa (m. 1989; div. 1997)
- Partner: Carla Camurati (1983–1986)
- Children: 4 (including Bel)

Paulo José Gómez de Souza (20 March 1937 – 11 August 2021) was a Brazilian actor.

== Selected filmography ==
=== Film ===
- 1965: The Priest and the Girl - Priest
- 1966: Todas as Mulheres do Mundo - Paulo
- 1967: Edu, coração de ouro - Edu
- 1968: O Homem Nu - Sílvio Proença the Writer
- 1968: Bebel, garota-propaganda - Bernardo
- 1968: Os Marginais - (segment "Guilherme")
- 1968: As amorosas - Marcelo
- 1968: A vida provisória - Estevao
- 1969: Macunaíma - White Macunaíma / Macunaíma's mother
- 1969: Como vai, vai bem?
- 1970: Of Gods and the Undead
- 1971: A Culpa - Heitor
- 1971: Gaudêncio, o Centauro dos Pampas - Gaudêncio
- 1972: Cassy Jones, o Magnífico Sedutor - Cassy Jones
- 1975: O Rei da Noite - Tertuliano (Tezinho)
- 1981: Eles Não Usam Black-Tie - Padre Bastos
- 1981: O Homem do Pau-Brasil - The courier
- 1983: A Difícil Viagem - Evandro
- 1988: O Mentiroso - Augusto
- 1989: Faca de Dois Gumes - Jorge Bragança
- 1989: Dias Melhores Virão - Pompeu
- 1991: A Grande Arte - Detective
- 1997: Policarpo Quaresma, herói do Brasil - Policarpo Quaresma
- 1997: Anahy de las Misiones - Joca Ramírez
- 1999: Outras estórias - Tio Manantonio
- 2002: Dias de Nietzsche em Turim - Richard Wagner
- 2002: Poeta de Sete Faces (Documentary)
- 2003: Benjamim - Benjamim Zambraia (old)
- 2003: O Homem Que Copiava - Paulo
- 2003: Apolônio Brasil, O Campeão da Alegria
- 2003: O Vestido - Doutor Espanhol
- 2004: Como Fazer Um Filme de Amor - Narrator
- 2004: Person
- 2006: Saneamento Básico - Otaviano
- 2007: Pequenas Histórias - Arlindo
- 2008: A Festa Da Menina Morta - Padre
- 2008: Juventude - David
- 2009: Insolação - Andrei
- 2010: Quincas Berro d'Água - Quincas
- 2011: Meu País - Armando
- 2011: O Palhaço - Valdemar / Puro Sangue

=== Television ===
- 1969: Véu de noiva - Zé Mário
- 1970-1971: Assim na terra como no céu - Samuca
- 1972: O primeiro amor - Shazan
- 1971-1972: O homem que deve morrer - André Vila Verde
- 1972-1974: Shazan, Xerife & cia - Shazan
- 1974: Super Manoela - Marcelo
- 1976: O casarão - Jarbas
- 1985: O Tempo e o Vento - Alvarino Amaral
- 1985-1988: Armação Ilimitada - Zelda's father
- 1986-1987: Roda de fogo - Celso Rezende
- 1988: Olho por Olho - Marcelo Fernandes
- 1988: Sampa - Gregório
- 1988: Vida nova - Francisco
- 1989-1990: Tieta - Gladstone
- 1990-1991: Araponga - Érico Saldanha
- 1991-1992: Vamp - Ivan
- 1993: O Mapa da Mina - Ivo Simeone
- 1993-1994: Olho no Olho
- 1994: A madona de cedro - Pedro
- 1995: Engraçadinha
- 1995: Decadência - Cego
- 1995-1996: Explode Coração - Jairo
- 1997-1998: Por Amor - Orestes Greco
- 1998: Era Uma Vez - Shazan
- 1998: Labirinto - Otacílio Martins Fraga
- 1999: Luna Caliente - Monteiro
- 2000: A Muralha - Padre Simão
- 2001: Um Anjo Caiu do Céu - Alceu
- 2003: Agora É que São Elas - Benigno
- 2004: Senhora do Destino - Arthur
- 2004: Um Só Coração - Dr.Varela
- 2004-2005: O Pequeno Alquimista - Zaratustra
- 2006: JK - Augusto Elías
- 2009: Caminho das Índias - Profeta Gentileza
- 2011: Morde & Assopra - Plínio
- 2014: Em Família - Benjamim Machado (final appearance)
