= Carolina Oliveira =

Brazilian actress

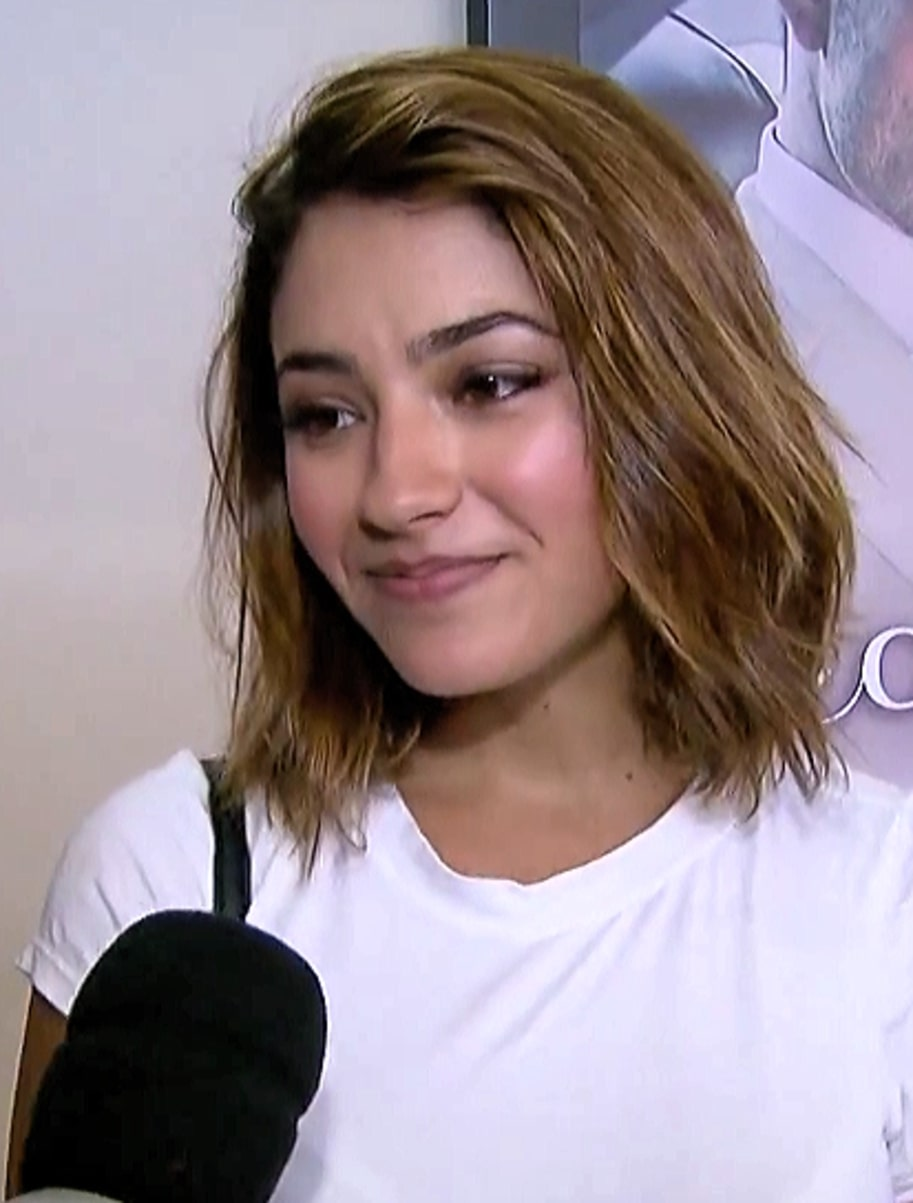
- Oliveira in 2017
- Born: Carolina Machado de Oliveira; 29 November 1994 (age 31); São José dos Campos, São Paulo, Brazil
- Occupation: Actress
- Years active: 2005–present
- Spouse: Juan Ciancio (m. 2021)
- Parent(s): Rosimary de Oliveira (mother); Geraldo Machado de Oliveira (father)
- Relatives: Leonardo Oliveira (younger brother)

Carolina Machado de Oliveira (born 29 November 1994) is a Brazilian actress. In 2005, she was nominated for an International Emmy Award for Best Actress for her role in the show Hoje É Dia de Maria, being the first Brazilian actress to do so.

== Biography ==
Her first television appearance was in the Rede Globo miniseries Hoje É Dia de Maria, directed by Luiz Fernando Carvalho, having a continuing series called Hoje É Dia de Maria 2.

In 2009, she was in India – A Love Story, where she played Chanti Ananda, an Indian teenager who goes against traditions and wants to study abroad and not marry.

In 2010, she starred in the movie Amazônia Caruana, directed by Tizuka Yamasaki. In Ti Ti Ti, she played the role of Gabi, who becomes involved with the son of Jacques Leclair (Alexandre Borges) and becomes pregnant.

In 2021 she moved to Barcelona and in 2024 she is focused on her music working on her first EP "Ese amor del que hablan las canciones".

== Filmography ==
=== Television ===
Year	Title	Role	Notes
2005	Hoje É Dia de Maria	Maria (child)	
2005	Hoje É Dia de Maria 2	Maria	
2006	Páginas da Vida	Gabriela Cunha Azevedo (Gabi)	
2007	Dança das Crianças 1	Herself	Reality show of Domingão do Faustão
2009	India – A Love Story	Chanti Ananda	
2009	Episódio Especial	Herself	Cameo
2010	Ti Ti Ti	Gabriela Moura (Gabi)	
2012	As Brasileiras	Cíntia	Episode: "A Doméstica de Vitória"
2015	I Love Paraisópolis	Natasha	
2017	Apocalipse	Suzana	
2019	Juacas	Nanda	Main cast (season 2); 17 episodes
2019	Jezabel	Atalia	
2021	Gênesis	Kira	

=== Film ===
Year	Title	Role
2009	Flordelis - Basta uma Palavra para Mudar	
2010	Amazônia Caruana	Zeneida
