= Edson Celulari =

Brazilian actor (born 1958)

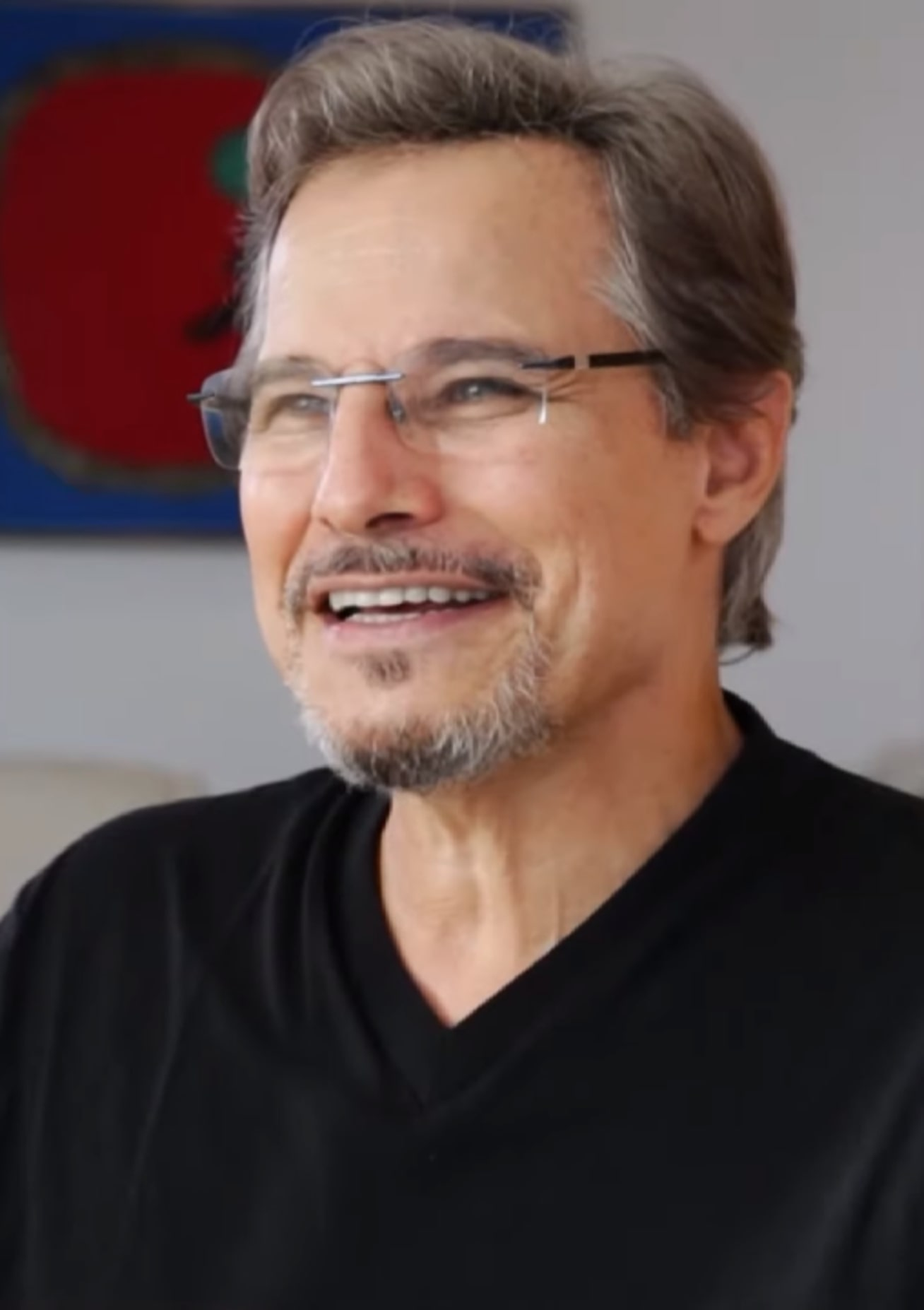
- Celulari in 2020
- Born: Edson Francisco Celulari; 20 March 1958 (age 68); Bauru, São Paulo, Brazil
- Occupation: Actor
- Years active: 1977–present
- Spouses: Cláudia Raia (m. 1993; div. 2010) Karin Roepke (m. 2017)
- Children: 2

Edson Francisco Celulari (born 20 March 1958) is a Brazilian actor.

== Biography ==
Celulari was a member of Porão 7, an amateur theater company from São Carlos. When he was 16 years old, he moved to São Paulo to study at the University of São Paulo's Dramatic Art School. Celulari debuted on television in 1978, on TV Tupi's telenovela Salário Minimo. Since then, Celulari acted in several TV, film and stage productions.

He was married to fellow actress Cláudia Raia from 1993 to 2010. They acted together in the telenovelas Deus nos Acuda and Torre de Babel.

== Filmography ==
=== Television ===
Ano	Título	Papel	Notas
1978	Salário Minimo	Ivan	
1979	Gaivotas	Mário	
1979	Casa Fantástica		
1980	Marina	Ivan	
1980	Plumas & Paetês	Kurlan Salgado	
1981	Ciranda de Pedra	Sérgio	
1982	O Homem Proibido	Carlos	
1983	Louco Amor	Marcelo Paiva	Episode: "April 11th"
1983	Guerra dos Sexos	Zenon da Silva	
1984	Amor com Amor Se Paga	Tomaz Correia	
1985	Um Sonho a Mais	Joaquim Bueno de Andrade	
1986	Cambalacho	Thiago Souza e Silva	
1987	Sassaricando	Jorge Miguel Gutierrez de Pádua "Guel"	
1988	Chapadão do Bugre	José de Arimatéia	
1989	Que Rei Sou Eu?	Jean Pierre	
1990	Brasileiras e Brasileiros	Totó	
1990	Fronteiras do Desconhecido	Warden Baker	Episode: "Inimigos Públicos"
1991	Mundo da Lua	Saint George	Episodes: "Viagem à Lua" / "Hello, Monalisa"
1992	Deus Nos Acuda	Ricardo Goulart Bismark	
1993	Fera Ferida	Raimundo Flamel / Feliciano Mota da Costa Júnior	
1994	Caso Especial	Douglas	Episode: "Lisbela e o Prisioneiro"
1995	Decadência	Mariel Batista	
1995	Explode Coração	Júlio Cezar Falcão	
1995	Você Decide		Episode: "Não Se Pode Ter Tudo"
1996	Sai de Baixo	Marcão	Episode: "Fora Daqui"
1996	A Comédia da Vida Privada		Episode: "Drama"
1997	A Justiceira	Jamil	Episode: "Mesmo que Seja Eu"
1998	Torre de Babel	Henrique Leme Toledo	
1998	Dona Flor e Seus Dois Maridos	Valdomiro Santos Guimarães "Vadinho"	
1999	Vila Madalena	Solano Xavier	
1999	Sai de Baixo	Alex Antibes	Episode: "Dona Magda e Seus Dois Maridos"
1999	Você Decide		Episode: "Juízo Final"
2000	Aquarela do Brasil	Captain Hélio Aguiar	
2001	As Filhas da Mãe	Edmilson Rocha	Episode: "August 27th"
2001	A Grande Família	Carlos	Episode: "Papai Está Com a Cachorra"
2001	Os Normais	Eduardo "Edu"	Episode: "Implicância é Normal"
2002	Sabor da Paixão	Jean Valjean	
2002	Sai de Baixo	Leonardo "Léo"	Episode: "My Fair Mula"
2002	Os Normais	Paulo Arthur	Episode: "Desconfianças Normais"
2002	Brava Gente	César	Episode: "O Enterro da Cafetina"
2002	Sítio do Picapau Amarelo	Don Quixote	Episode: "Dom Quixote das Crianças"
2003	Os Normais	Cláudio "Cláudião"	Episode: "O Grande Segredo de Rui"
2003	Celebridade	Himself	Episode: "October 13, 2003"
2004	Um Só Coração	Ciccilio Matarazzo	
2005	América	Glauco Lopes Prado	
2006	Páginas da Vida	Sílvio Duarte	
2008	Beleza Pura	Guilherme Medeiros	
2009	Zorra Total	Himself	Episode: "August 29, 2009"
2009	Chico e Amigos	Lourival	End of year special
2010	Araguaia	Fernando Rangel	Episodes: "September 27–October 4"
2010	S.O.S. Emergência	Gustavo	Episode: "Cuidado, Sexo frágil"
2012	As Brasileiras	Jair Dantas	Episode: "A Inocente de Brasília"
2012	Guerra dos Sexos	Felipe de Alcântara Pereira Barreto	
2014	Animal	Doctor João Paulo Gil	
2014	Alto Astral	Marcelo Barbosa	
2017	A Força do Querer	Raul Sabóia Dantas "Dantas"	
2018	Malhação: Vidas Brasileiras	Eduardo Mantovani	Episodes: "March 7–29"
2018	O Tempo Não Para	Teotônio Augusto Sabino Machado "Dom Sabino"	
2023	Fuzuê	Nero de Braga e Silva	

=== Film ===
Year	Title	Role	Notes
1980	Asa Branca - Um Sonho Brasileiro	Antônio dos Reis (Asa Branca)	
1982	Os Vagabundos Trapalhões	Carlos	
1983	Inocência	Cirino	
1986	Ópera do Malandro	Max Overseas	
1986	Sexo Frágil	Luiz/ Leila	
1987	Brasa Adormecida	Ticão	
1991	A Revolta dos Carnudos	Doutor	Short film
1997	For All - O Trampolim da Vitória	Nazi agent	
2006	Diário de Um Novo Mundo	Gaspar de Fróes	
2018	Teu Mundo não cabe nos Meus Olhos	Vitório	Also producer
2018	Contra a Parede	João Guilherme	
2018	Cinzas	—	Direction and production
2024	Nosso Lar 2: Os Mensageiros	Anicleto	

== Stage ==
Year	Title	Role
1977	Errare Humanum Est	
1977	Beethoven Proprietário de Um Cérebro	
1978	Os Penitentes do Santo Cabrito	
1978	O Despertar da Primavera	
1982	Quero	
1984	Hamlet	Laertes
1986	Fedra	Hipólito
1988	Louco de Amor	
1990	Ela Odeia Mel	
1991	O Cid	
1991–93	Calígula	Calígula
1994	Capital Estrangeiro	
1997	Don Juan	Don Juan
2001	Fim do Jogo	Clóvis / Ham
2007	Dom Quixote de Lugar Nenhum	Don Quixote
2009–10	Hairspray	Edna Turnblad
2011–12	Nem Um Dia Se Passa Sem Noticias Suas	Joaquim
