= Asa Branca: Um Sonho Brasileiro =

1981 film directed by Djalma Limongi Batista

- Theatrical release poster
- Directed by: Djalma Limongi Batista
- Written by: Djalma Limongi Batista
- Produced by: Vera Roquette Pinto
- Starring: Edson Celulari
- Cinematography: Gualter Limongi
- Edited by: José Motta
- Music by: Mario Velerio Zaccaro
- Production companies: Embrafilme; Roberto Santos Produções; Cinema do Século XXI
- Distributed by: Embrafilme
- Release dates: 1981 (Brasília Film Festival); May 24, 1982
- Country: Brazil
- Language: Portuguese

Asa Branca: Um Sonho Brasileiro is a 1981 Brazilian drama film directed by Djalma Limongi Batista. Its plot follows the trajectory of Antônio "Asa Branca" dos Reis, a footballer who starts in Mariana do Sul, a fictional city of the interior of São Paulo, until he reaches a FIFA World Cup.

== Cast ==
- Edson Celulari as Antônio "Asa Branca" dos Reis
- Eva Wilma as Asa Branca's mother
- Walmor Chagas as Isaías
- Gianfrancesco Guarnieri as Toninho
- Rita Cadillac as Sylvia
- Regina Wilker as Cleyse
- Mira Haar as Sulamitinha "Rita Pavone"
- Geraldo Del Rey as Asa Branca's father

== Production ==
The filming took place in three months; the first scenes were shot in São Paulo, with the staff moving to Santa Bárbara d'Oeste, and then Rio de Janeiro.

== Reception ==
At the 14th Brasília Film Festival Batista won the Best Director Award, Celulari won the Best Actor Award, and Chagas won the Best Supporting Actor Award. Batista and Celulari would win the same awards at the 10th Gramado Film Festival. It also won the Air France Award for Best Film, Best Director, and Best Actor. It was also entered into the 1982 Three Continents Festival.
