= Felicidade =

- Genre: Telenovela
- Created by: Manoel Carlos
- Based on: Tales written by Aníbal Machado
- Directed by: Denise Saraceni
- Starring: Maitê Proença; Tatyane Goulart; Tony Ramos; Vivianne Pasmanter; Herson Capri; Marcos Winter; Monique Curi; Eduardo Caldas; Maria Ceiça; Maria Alves; Edney Giovenazzi; Ariclê Perez; Laura Cardoso; Eliane Giardini; Umberto Magnani; Esther Góes; Othon Bastos; Rejane Goulart; Cristina Prochaska; Ana Beatriz Nogueira; Sebastião Vasconcelos see more
- Opening theme: Felicidade by Roupa Nova
- Ending theme: Felicidade by Roupa Nova
- Country of origin: Brazil
- Original language: Portuguese
- No. of episodes: 203

Production
- Running time: 50 minutes

Original release
- Network: TV Globo
- Release: 7 October 1991 – 30 May 1992

Related
- Salomé; Despedida de Solteiro

Felicidade (English: Happiness) is a Brazilian telenovela produced and broadcast by TV Globo between October 7, 1991 and May 30, 1992. It was created by Manoel Carlos with the collaboration of Elizabeth Jhin and directed by Denise Saraceni, based on the tales of Aníbal Machado.

== Cast ==
| Actor/Actress | Character |
|---|---|
| Maitê Proença | Helena de Sousa |
| Tatyane Goulart | Beatriz de Sousa Peixoto (Bia) |
| Tony Ramos | Álvaro Peixoto |
| Vivianne Pasmanter | Débora Meirelles |
| Herson Capri | Mário Silvano |
| Laura Cardoso | Cândida Peixoto |
| Edney Giovenazzi | Chico Treva |
| Marcos Winter | José Diogo Cabral (Zé Diogo) |
| Monique Curi | Lídia de Sousa |
| Eduardo Caldas | Álvaro Meirelles Peixoto Filho (Alvinho) |
| Ariclê Perez | Ametista de Sousa |
| Umberto Magnani | Ataxerxes de Sousa |
| Esther Góes | Alma Meirelles |
| Othon Bastos | Gerson Meirelles |
| Maria Ceiça | Antônia Batista (Tuquinha) |
| Maurício Gonçalves | Aristides (Tide) |
| Yara Cortes | Dona Filomena Cabral (Dona Filó) |
| Sebastião Vasconcelos | João do Piano |
| Regina Dourado | Rosália |
| Maria Alves | Maria |
| Milton Gonçalves | Batista |
| Cristina Ribeiro | Claudete |
| Serafim Gonzalez | Zé Maria |
| Rejane Goulart | Eliana |
| Cristina Prochaska | Sheila |
| Benjamin Cattan | Onofre |
| Lala Schneider | Celeste |
| Paulo Figueiredo | Bruno Louzada |
| Eliane Giardini | Isaura |
| Ary Coslov | Dr. Alfredo |
| Sandra Bréa | Rosita |
| Kátia Drummond | Raimunda Batista (Betsy) |
| Cláudio Gabriel | Romeu |
| Ana Beatriz Nogueira | Selma |
| Bruno Garcia | Luiz |
| Ísis de Mello | Clara (Clarinha) |
| Lúcia Abreu | Professora Paula |
| Francisco Dantas | Seu Matias |
| Beatriz Lyra | Dona Isolina |
| Ada Chaseliov | Ana |
| Nelson Freitas | Rogério |
| Maria Adélia | Rosa |
| Aline Menezes | Isabel Batista (Bel) |
| Paulo Pinheiro | Moreira |
| Sílvia Massari | Marisa |

== Special Participations ==
| Actor/Actress | Character |
|---|---|
| Andréa Carvana | Neuza |
| Andréa Drago | Solange |
| Andréa Miranda | Denise |
| Aracy Balabanian | Paquita |
| Benvindo Siqueira | Delegado Noronha |
| Cassiano Ricardo | Sérgio |
| Castro Gonzaga | Padre Bento |
| Cláudia Magno | Renée |
| Cláudio Ayres da Motta | Prefeito Olegário |
| Cláudio Mamberti | Senador Amílcar Machado |
| Cristina Amadeo | Renata |
| Denise Del Vecchio | Dinorah |
| Evandro Monteiro | Zeca Ventania |
| Fernando José | Padre Antönio |
| Flávia Bonato | Eunice |
| Iran Mello | Raul |
| Jana Palma | Thelminha |
| Jairo Mattos | Dr. Ricardo |
| Jayme Leibovitch | Dr. Fausto |
| José Luiz Ribeiro | Padre Anselmo |
| Júlia Almeida | Fernanda |
| Lana Francis | Joana |
| Louise Cardoso | Madalena |
| Luiz Guilherme | Leandro Chaves |
| Marcos Lima | Clóvis |
| Marly Bueno | Leonor |
| Paulo Carvalho | André |
| Paulo Leite | Rafael |
| Pedro Jardim | Marcinho |
| Tina Ferreira | Cecília Louzada |
| Xala Felippi | Teresa |
