= Decadência =

- Created by: Dias Gomes
- Directed by: Ignácio Coqueiro; Roberto Farias
- Starring: Edson Celulari; Adriana Esteves; Raul Gazolla; Zezé Polessa; Stênio Garcia; Ingra Liberato; Ariclê Perez; Luiz Fernando Guimarães; Maria Zilda Bethlem; Betty Gofman; Maria Padilha; Rubens Corrêa
- Country of origin: Brazil
- Original language: Portuguese
- No. of episodes: 12

Original release
- Network: Rede Globo
- Release: September 5 – September 22, 1995

Decadência is a 1995 Brazilian miniseries produced and displayed by Rede Globo between September 5 and September 22, 1995, in a total of 12 chapters.

Written by Dias Gomes, it was freely inspired by a novel of the author himself, it counted in general direction and supervision of Roberto Farias and Ignácio Coqueiro.

The main characters are played by Edson Celulari and Adriana Esteves.

== Plot ==
The miniseries shows the decline of a conservative and once-powerful Carioca family, the Tavares Branco, in the period from 1984 to 1992. Following the death of Tancredo Neves to the election and downfall of President Fernando Collor, the Tavares Branco are failing and revealing their moral and financial problems.

The plot begins in 1970 with the judge Tavares Branco accepting a priest's request to raise an orphan boy, Mariel, who stays under the care of maid Jandira. Mariel grows and becomes the family driver, but ends up getting involved with Carla, the youngest of the house, and is expelled from the mansion, accused of rape.

Time passes, and Mariel finds Jandira, who has always had a love for the former driver. She takes him to a cult in a Neo-Pentecostalism church, and Mariel finds salvation in her church for his problems. Five years later, he becomes a millionaire after founding his own church, the Temple of the Divine Flame, while his former masters impoverish. But the same feelings of the past continue to connect Mariel's new life to the universe of the Tavares Branco: the passion for Carla and the desire for revenge.

Although they love each other, Mariel and Carla have different ideals of life: he intends to grow more and more with their churches, and she, quite politicized, elect of the PT, does not agree with her unethical way of acting.

== Cast ==
Actor/Actress	Character
Edson Celulari	Mariel Batista
Adriana Esteves	Carla Tavares Branco
Raul Gazolla	Victor Prata
Zezé Polessa	Jandira
Stênio Garcia	Albano Tavares Branco Filho
Ingra Liberato	Rafaela Couto Neves
Milton Gonçalves	Jovildo Siqueira
Maria Padilha	Sônia Tavares Branco
Ariclê Perez	Celeste Tavares Branco
Betty Gofman	Suzana Tavares Branco
Oswaldo Loureiro	Emiliano Couto Neves
Cibele Larrama	Mariana
Antônio Calloni	Cleto
Patrícia Lopes	Nanci
Leonardo José	Vicentinho
Patrícia Naves	Sueli
Rafael Mondego	Neco

Special participation

Actor	Character
Cássio Gabus Mendes	Priest Giovani
Paulo Gorgulho	Delegado Etevaldo Morsa
Isadora Ribeiro	Luzia
Ricardo Blat	Artêmio
Sílvia Bandeira	Estela Couto Neves
Norma Geraldy	Dalva Tavares Branco

Introducing

Actor	Character
Virgínia Novick	Vilma Luchesi

Guest actors

Luiz Fernando Guimarães as PJ (Pedro Jorge Tavares Branco)
Maria Zilda Bethlem as Irene
Rubens Corrêa as Albano Tavares Branco
Yolanda Cardoso as Tia Lalu

== Repercussion ==
Decadência caused a great controversy with a religious preaching of Mariel, character of Edson Celulari, who found a quote from the spiritual leader of the Universal Church of the Kingdom of God, Bishop Edir Macedo.

The miniseries provoked a revolt of the spiritual leader. At the time of its screening, in September 1995, a Rede Globo was in "war" with a Church, having shown several reports against the leader of the church weeks before the miniseries debut. How strong scenes of the miniseries were considered as a provocation and a blasphemy to the evangelical faith. In an episode of the miniseries, during a sex scene, a bra was thrown over the Bible.
