= Flávio Galvão =

Brazilian actor (born 1949)

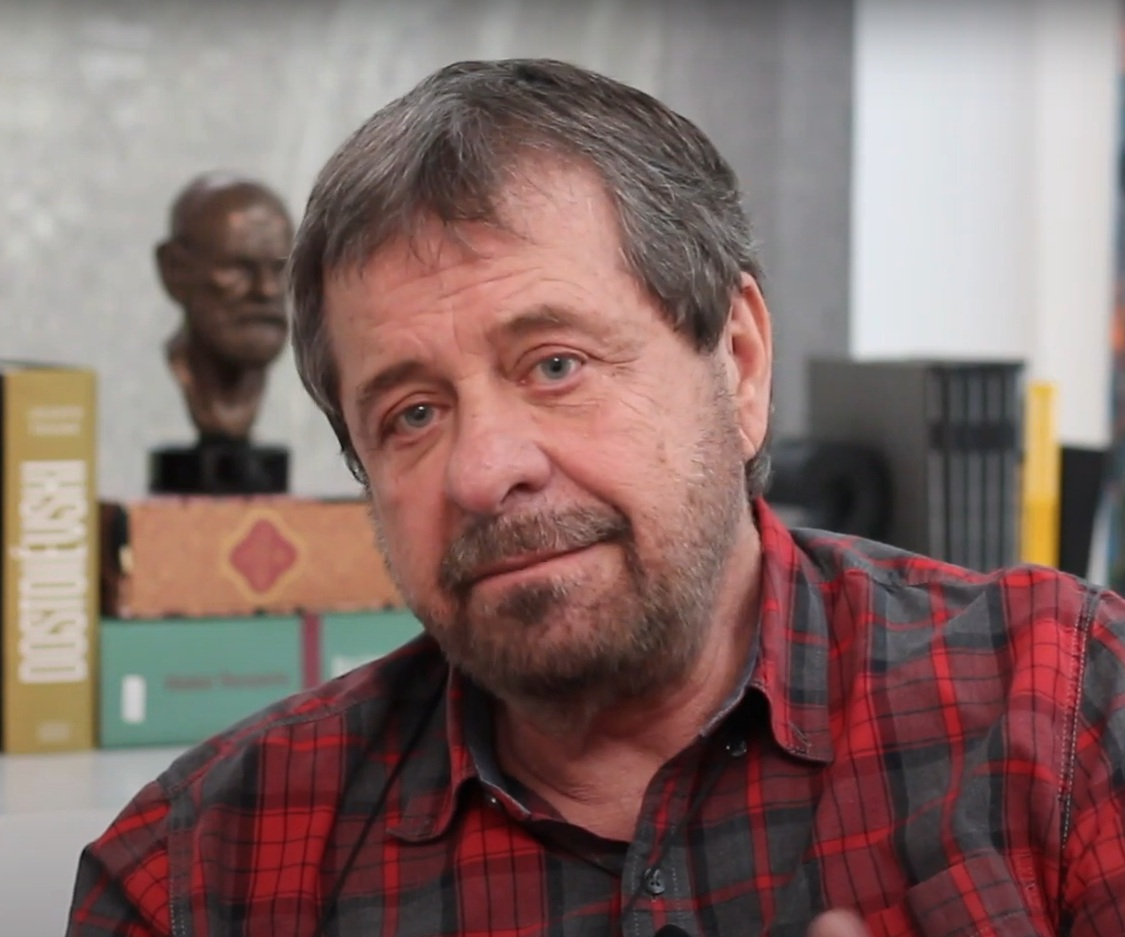
- Galvão in 2019
- Born: Flávio José Galvão de França; July 30, 1949 (age 76); São Paulo, Brazil
- Occupation(s): Actor, TV personality
- Years active: 1970–present

Flávio José Galvão de França better known in Brazil as Flávio Galvão (born July 30, 1949) is a Brazilian actor. He also worked with dubbing, with his work better known in the area and the second voice of Major Nelson in I Dream of Jeannie.

== Work on television ==
- 2021 – Gênesis – God (RecordTV)
- 2017 – Apocalipse (RecordTV)
- 2008 – Revelação – Jorge Castelli (SBT)
- 2007 – É Verdade ou é Mentira – Apresentador (Rede Bandeirantes)
- 2006 – Paixões Proibidas – Domingos de Azevedo (Rede Bandeirantes)
- 2005 – Os Ricos Também Choram – Evaristo Martins (SBT)
- 2004 – Senhora do Destino – Jorge Maciel (Rede Globo)
- 2002 – O Quinto dos Infernos – Cauper (Rede Globo)
- 2001 – Porto dos Milagres – Deodato Pereira (Rede Globo)
- 2000 – Esplendor – Arnaldo (Rede Globo)
- 1999 – Força de um Desejo – Nereu (Rede Globo)
- 1998 – Corpo Dourado – Orlando (Rede Globo)
- 1997 – A Indomada – Richard da Silva Taylor (Rede Globo)
- 1996 – Quem É Você? – Fábio (Rede Globo)
- 1995 – Irmãos Coragem – Gérson Louzada (Rede Globo)
- 1993 – Sonho Meu – João Fontana (Rede Globo)
- 1991 – Grande Pai – Arthur (SBT)
- 1990 – Araponga – João Paulo Nogueira
- 1990 – Escrava Anastácia – Dom Antônio (Rede Manchete)
- 1989 – Tieta – Dário (Rede Globo)
- 1988 – Olho por Olho – Justo Falcão (Rede Manchete)
- 1987 – O Outro – Benjamin (Rede Globo)
- 1986 – Cambalacho – Athos Trancoso (Rede Globo)
- 1984 – Corpo a Corpo – Raul Monteiro (Rede Globo)
- 1984 – Amor com Amor Se Paga – Tito (Rede Globo)
- 1983 – Sabor de Mel – Guilherme (Rede Bandeirantes)
- 1982 – Destino – Fernando Lascorain (SBT)
- 1981 – O Resto É Silêncio – Bernardo (TV Cultura)
- 1981 – Partidas Dobradas (TV Cultura)
- 1981 – O Fiel e a Pedra – Bernardo (TV Cultura)
- 1981 – O Vento do Mar Aberto – Bento (TV Cultura)
- 1979 – O Todo Poderoso – Jonas (Rede Bandeirantes)
- 1979 – Dinheiro Vivo – Eduardo (TV Tupi)
- 1978 – Salário Mínimo (TV Tupi)
- 1977 – Éramos Seis – Lúcio (TV Tupi)
- 1975 – Um Dia, o Amor – Wálter (TV Tupi)
- 1975 – Meu Rico Português – Daniel (TV Tupi)
- 1974 – O Machão – Edmundo (TV Tupi)
- 1973 – As Divinas... e Maravilhosas – Wálter (TV Tupi)
- 1973 – Mulheres de Areia – Ricardo (TV Tupi)
- 1973 – A Volta de Beto Rockfeller – Dudu (TV Tupi)
- 1972 – Vila Sésamo – Antônio
- 1971 – O Preço de um Homem – Marcos (TV Tupi)
- 1971 – Hospital – Dr. Celso (TV Tupi)
- 1970 – Simplesmente Maria – Raul (TV Tupi)

== Voiceover ==
- 2nd voice of Major Nelson (Larry Hagman) in I Dream of Jeannie
- Maguila in design Maguila, the Gorillas
- Matraca-Trica in design Matraca and Fofoquinha
