= Sonho Meu =

- Also known as: Mi Sueño
- Genre: Telenovela
- Starring: Patrícia França; Leonardo Vieira; Carolina Pavanelli; Fábio Assunção; Beatriz Segall; Elias Gleizer; Isabela Garcia; Walmor Chagas; Yoná Magalhães; Flávio Galvão; Françoise Forton; Daniela Camargo; Jayme Periard; José de Abreu; Nívea Maria; Carlos Alberto; Débora Duarte; Cristina Mullins
- Opening theme: "Querer é Poder", by José Augusto and Xuxa
- Country of origin: Brazil
- Original language: Portuguese
- No. of episodes: 197

Production
- Production company: Central Globo de Produção

Original release
- Network: Rede Globo
- Release: September 27, 1993 – May 14, 1994

Related
- Mulheres de Areia (1993); Tropicaliente (1994)

Sonho Meu (Portuguese pronunciation: [ˈsõɲu ˈmew], transl. Dream of Mine) is a Brazilian telenovela produced and broadcast by Rede Globo. It ran from September 27, 1993, to May 14, 1994. It was written by Marcílio Moraes and directed by Reynaldo Boury, with co-direction by Roberto Naar. The action takes place in the city of Curitiba. It was also broadcast in Portugal.

== Opening ==
The opening credits are shown with the protagonist Carolina Pavanelli making drawings that move and float around her while the opening song "Sonho Meu", sung by Xuxa and José Augusto, plays.

== Location ==
Sonho Meu was notably one of the few Rede Globo telenovelas not to be set in Rio de Janeiro or São Paulo. Instead, it was set in Curitiba, making use of the city's landmarks as shooting locations.

== Ratings ==
Sonho Meu was one of the most successful Brazilian telenovelas of the 90s, having been the last telenovela of the 6:00 p.m. time slot to have an overall average higher than 40 points, reaching an average of 44 points and in some episodes as high as 60.

== Cast ==
- Patrícia França - Cláudia
- Leonardo Vieira - Lucas
- Carolina Pavanelli - Maria Carolina 'Laleska'
- Fábio Assunção - Jorge
- Isabela Garcia - Lúcia
- Elias Gleizer - Tio Zé
- Beatriz Segall - Paula Candeias de Sá
- Walmor Chagas - Afrânio Guerra
- Yoná Magalhães - Magnólia
- Débora Duarte - Mariana
- Nívea Maria - Elisa
- Míriam Pires - Cecília
- Flávio Galvão - João Fontana
- José de Abreu - Geraldo
- Françoise Forton - Gilda
- Mauro Mendonça - Carlos
- Jayme Periard - William
- Jorge Cherques - Bóris
- Eri Johnson - Giácomo Madureira
- Carlos Kroeber - Varela
- Priscila Camargo - Polaca
- Cristina Mullins - Márcia
- Cláudia Magno - Josefina
- Alexandre Lippiani - Luís Ortega
- Ângelo Paes Leme - Santiago
- Bernadete Lys - Júlia
- Beta Madruga - Taboinha
- Carlos Alberto - Fiapo
- Carmem Caroline - Ximena
- Cláudia Sheer - Aída
- Daniela Camargo - Francisca
- Eduardo Caldas - Chico (credited as Eduardo Albuquerque)
- Fabiano Miranda - Trigo
- Flávia Alessandra - Inez
- Gisela Reimann - Alice
- Haydée Miranda
- Mariana Da Silva
- Hélio Ribeiro - Juarez
- José Augusto Branco
- Karine Melo - Marília
- Lina Fróes - Rosa
- Luíza Curvo - Aninha
- Maria Thompson - Clara
- Mariane Ebert
- Mauro Gorini - Feriado
- Monique Lafond
- Naura Schneider - Helena
- Nedira Campos - Angela
- Newton Martins - Mercadoria
- Renata de Castro Barbosa - Carla
- Renato Pinheiro - Cacá
- Ruthinéa de Moraes - Alcinéia
- Sérgio Mannarino - Carlos Alberto
- Tânia Loureiro - Miriam
