= Marcello Antony =

Brazilian actor (born 1965)

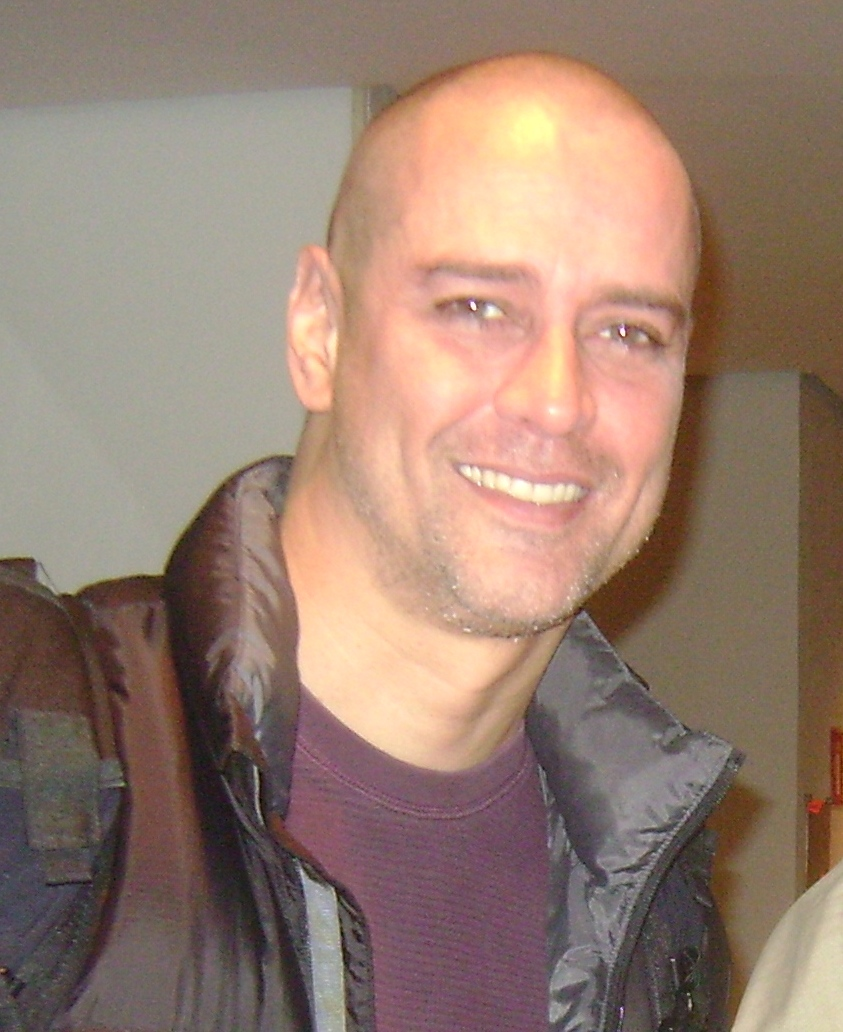
- Born: Marcello Couto Antony de Farias; 28 January 1965 (age 61); Rio de Janeiro, Brazil
- Occupation: Actor
- Years active: 1996–present

Marcello Couto Antony de Farias better known as Marcello Antony (born 28 January 1965) is a Brazilian actor. He lives in Cascais, Portugal.

== Filmography ==
Film
Year	Title	Role	Notes
1996	A Casa de Açúcar		
2000	O Dia da Caça	Nando	
2001	A Partilha	Bruno Diegues	
2001	A Samba for Sherlock	Marquês de Sales	
2003	Viva Sapato!	Fifi Capote	
2004	Sexo, Amor e Traição	Nestor	
2008	A Guerra dos Rocha	César	
2009	Flordelis: Basta uma Palavra para Mudar	Pr. Anderson do Carmo	
2016	Little Secret	Vilfredo Schurmann	

Television
Year	Title	Role	Notes
1996	O Rei do Gado	Bruno Berdinazi	
1996-1997	Salsa e Merengue	Eugenio	177 episodes
1998	Torre de Babel	Guilherme Toledo	30 episodes
1999	Terra Nostra	Marco Antonio Magliano	
2003	Mulheres Apaixonadas	Sérgio Vasconcelos	203 episodes
2004	Um Só Coração	Rodolfo Souza Borba	52 episodes
2004-2005	Senhora do Destino	Viriato / Veriato	148 episodes
2005-2006	Belíssima	André Santana	187 episodes
2007	Paraíso Tropical	Cássio	134 episodes
2010	Passione	Gerson Gouveia	101 episodes
2012	As Brasileiras	Edson	
2013	Amor à Vida	Dr. Eron Torgano	
2017	Rock Story	Jorginho	8 episodes
2017-2018	Malhação: Viva a Diferença	Edgar Gutierrez	213 episodes
