= Um Só Coração =

Brazilian miniseries

- Starring: Ana Paula Arósio; Erik Marmo; Débora Falabella; Daniel de Oliveira; Edson Celulari; Eliane Giardini; Antônio Calloni; Maria Fernanda Cândido; Cássio Scapin; Fernanda Paes Leme; Luís Melo; Cássio Gabus Mendes; José Rubens Chachá; Herson Capri; Letícia Sabatella; Marcello Antony; Paulo Leão; Miriam Freeland; Ângelo Antônio; Pascoal da Conceição; Betty Gofman
- Country of origin: Brazil
- Original language: Portuguese
- No. of episodes: 53

Original release
- Network: Rede Globo
- Release: January 6 – April 8, 2004

Um Só Coração is a 2004 Brazilian miniseries, produced by Rede Globo that paid homage to the city of São Paulo. It aired during the months of January, February and March 2004, when the celebration of the 450th anniversary of the founding of the city.

It presents Ana Paula Arósio, Erik Marmo, Edson Celulari, Letícia Sabatella, Herson Capri, Helena Ranaldi, Cássia Kiss, Cássio Gabus Mendes, Marcello Antony and Maria Fernanda Cândido in the lead roles.

== Cast ==
Actor	Character
Ana Paula Arósio	Yolanda Penteado
Edson Celulari	Cicillo Matarazzo
Erik Marmo	Martim Paes de Almeida
Maria Fernanda Cândido	Ana Schmidt
Marcello Antony	Rodolfo Sousa Borba
Herson Capri	Fernão Queiroz Chaves
Cássia Kiss	Guiomar Penteado
Tarcísio Meira	Coronel Totonho Sousa Borba
Letícia Sabatella	Maria Luísa Sousa Borba
Ângelo Antônio	Madiano Mattei
Cássio Gabus Mendes	Juvenal Penteado
José Rubens Chachá	Oswald de Andrade
Pascoal da Conceição	Mário de Andrade
Eliane Giardini	Tarsila do Amaral
Betty Gofman	Anita Malfatti
Ariclê Perez	Madame Claire
Glória Menezes	Camila Matarazzo
Daniel de Oliveira	Bernardo Sousa Borba
Helena Ranaldi	Lídia Rosenberg
Carlos Vereza	David Rosemberg
Antônio Calloni	Assis Chateaubriand
Débora Falabella	Raquel Rosenberg
Raul Cortez	Rogério
Paulo José	Dr. Varella
Fernanda Paes Leme	Elisa Furtado
Renato Scarpin	Joaquim
Paulo Goulart	Avelino
Daniela Escobar	Soledad
Cássio Scapin	Alberto Santos-Dumont
Sérgio Viotti	Samuel
Tato Gabus Mendes	Paulo Prado
Pedro Paulo Rangel	Senador Freitas Valle
Paulo Leão	Lasar Segall
Celso Frateschi	Ernesto da Silva
Miriam Freeland	Pagu (Patrícia Galvão)
Chica Xavier	Isolina
Maria Luísa Mendonça	Maria Bonomi
Leandra Leal	Ucha
Max Fercondini	João Cândido Sousa Borba (Candinho)
Júlia Feldens	Maria Laura Sousa Borba
Cláudio Fontana	Jayme Penteado
Selma Egrei	Olívia Guedes Penteado
Lu Grimaldi	Frida Schmidt da Silva
Fernanda Souza	Dulce Amaral
Mila Moreira	Lola Flores
Flávia Guedes	Gilda de Melo e Sousa
Ana Lúcia Torre	Sálua
Ranieri Gonzalez	Menotti Del Pichia
Marcelo Várzea	Guilherme de Almeida
Christiana Guinle	Danuza
Murilo Rosa	Frederico
Leopoldo Pacheco	Samir Schaim
Dira Paes	Magnólia
Magda Gomes	Maria José
Paula Manga	Gilda Arantes
Mika Lins	Elvira
Amandha Lee	Moema
Nizo Neto	Camilo
Nina Morena	Odila Pujol
Juliano Righetto	Waldemar Belizário
Tuna Dwek	Marinette Prado
Juliana Lohmann	Antônia
Gabriella Hess	Guiomarita Penteado
Maria Eduarda Manga	Maria Laura Sousa Borba (child)
Tamara Ribeiro	Érica
Igor Adamovich	João Cândido Sousa Borba (child)
Isabela Cunha	Ucha (child)
Daniel Henrique	Frederico (child)
Lucas Maia	Nonê
Christina Rodrigues	Criada de Soledad
Marly Bueno	Lúcia
