= Kananga do Japão =

Brazilian telenovela

- Genre: Telenovela
- Created by: Wilson Aguiar Filho
- Written by: Colmar Diniz; Gil Haguenauer; Guto Graça Mello; Leila Míccolis; Rodrigo Cid; Sérgio Perricone
- Directed by: Tizuka Yamasaki
- Starring: List: Cristiane Torloni Raul Gazolla Tônia Carrero Giuseppe Oristanio Elaine Cristina Carlos Alberto Júlia Lemmertz Rosamaria Murtinho Rubens Corrêa Paulo Castelli Cristiana Oliveira Tarcísio Filho Ana Beatriz Nogueira Carlos Eduardo Dolabella Lúcia Alves
- Opening theme: "Minha" by Misty
- Country of origin: Brazil
- No. of episodes: 208

Original release
- Network: Rede Manchete
- Release: July 19, 1989 – March 25, 1990

Kananga do Japão is a 208-chapter Brazilian telenovela produced and aired by Rede Manchete between July 19, 1989, and March 25, 1990, that replaced Olho por Olho and was succeeded by Pantanal. It was written by Wilson Aguiar Filho, in collaboration with Leila Míccolis, Colmar Diniz, Gil Haguenauer, Guto Graça Mello, Rodrigo Cid and Sérgio Perricone, under the supervision of Wilson Solon and Carlos Magalhães, with general direction by Tizuka Yamasaki and core direction by Jayme Monjardim. A critical and audience success, it won six categories at the APCA Awards.

It features Cristiane Torloni, Raul Gazolla, Tônia Carrero, Giuseppe Oristanio, Elaine Cristina, Carlos Alberto, Júlia Lemmertz and Rosamaria Murtinho in the lead roles.

== Production ==
Adolpho Bloch, president of Rede Manchete, suggested producing a drama that would portray the Grêmio Recreativo Familiar Kananga do Japão, a famous cabaret from the 1930s. He hired Aguiar Filho, who had already produced Marquesa de Santos and Dona Beija, the network's biggest teledramaturgical success since then. The project was intended to compensate for the negative impact of the previous production, Olho por Olho.

The team used photographic material, books and documents from the Museum of Image and Sound, the National Archives and the National Library to produce the script by Wilson Aguiar Filho. The broadcaster spent 20 million dollars on the production, which began filming on May 15, 1989.

As part of the story, the cast had to learn ballroom dancing, samba de gafieira, maxixe and foxtrot, as well as capoeira, snooker, etiquette and notions of Judaism. Manchete's method of attracting audiences was to narrate parts of the Getúlio Vargas and Washington Luís governments and Olga Benário's imprisonment within the story. According to artistic director Jayme Monjardim, "if this telenovela fails, Manchete will give up on dramaturgy".

=== Casting ===
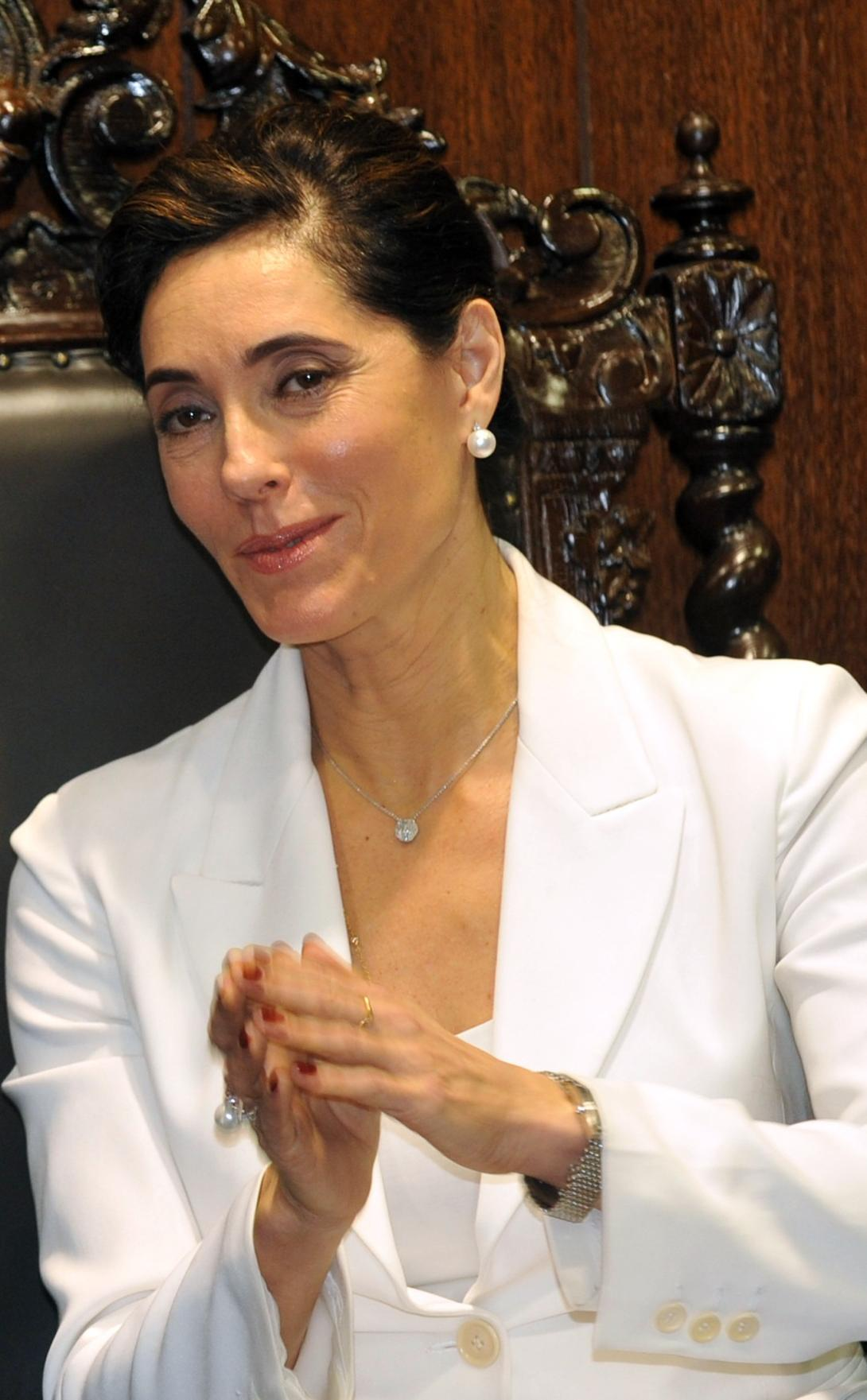
According to journalist Laranjeira, Cristiane Torloni's beauty "has never been shown so well in any other telenovela".

The cast was chosen by the network's own drama department. Maitê Proença was the first to be chosen for the show, but she was scheduled to return to TV Globo. Rede Manchete tried to hire successful actors from Globo, such as Glória Pires, Joana Fomm, Cláudia Raia and Marcos Paulo, but was not very successful, as several decided to stay with the rival channel. Ernesto Piccolo, Mário Gomes and José de Abreu auditioned to play Alex, but Raul Gazolla got the part.

=== Scenery and characterization ===
The setting for the majority of the plot is the Grêmio Recreativo Familiar Kananga do Japão, located in Praça Onze. More than 200 professionals were involved in the construction of a scenographic city of around 6,000 square meters in Grumari, Rio de Janeiro. The set design was entrusted to director Rodrigo Cid, who created stores, fountains, streetcar lines, schools and the Grêmio Recreativo Familiar Kananga do Japão. Other images were filmed at Manchete's studios in Vista Alegre.

A few days before the premiere, Rede Manchete signed a partnership with the Fundação do Cinema Brasileiro, which confirmed the transfer of scenes from films released between 1930 and 1939. The work of 500 engineers, architects and set designers to build the streetcars, tracks and houses lasted around four months and consumed 1.5 million dollars of the telenovela's 5.5 million dollar budget. According to the writer, "the biggest commitment was to portray what Praça Onze was like at that time."

Kananga do Japão mixes fiction, romance and history, with inevitable folkloric undertones. The plot involves a love triangle - a fascinating heroine impoverished by the crash of 1929, the son of a wealthy industrialist and an attractive bohemian adventurer - the residents of a boarding house in Rio's famous Praça XI and the visitors to a cabaret.

Make-up artist and aesthetician Guilherme Pereira and costume designer Colmar Diniz were responsible for the characterization of the actors based on the era presented. According to Pereira, "make-up in the 1930s exalted a woman's beauty like never before, and demanded a profound aesthetic sense, precision and harmony from a professional. Hair in small waves, thin eyebrows and drooping eyes made for a perfect face. But any slip-up could spell disaster. So, to arrive at the final composition of each character, a consensus is needed with the costumes, art, set design and the direction of the telenovela, as well as the actors themselves."

== Plot ==
In 1930, Dora is a fine girl whose family lost everything after the Great Depression and had to move to Rio de Janeiro with her mother Zulmira and sisters Madalena and Alzira to live in the pension of her uncles Joséphine and Epílogo. She starts working at the Grêmio Recreativo Familiar Kananga do Japão, where she falls in love with Alex, but decides to marry Danilo, a millionaire who could save her family. Disgruntled, Alex marries Lizette, Dora's rival in ballroom dancing, but the two live unhappily apart, especially when Danilo's stepmother, the diabolical Leticia, starts to torment Dora for being in love with her stepson. Elitists Silvia and Chico, Danilo's sister and father, also don't like Dora because she comes from a bankrupt family and start trying to ruin the marriage.

Meanwhile, Alzira falls in love with her cousin Julio, whose father Epilogo objects because he wants a rich girl for his son. He is so busy that he doesn't notice Joséphine's betrayals or the younger Vado's harassment of the maid Isaura. Dora's other cousin, Henrique, is also in forbidden love with Hannah, whose parents are against it because the boy is not Jewish. In Kananga do Japão there's also Daisy's alcoholism caused by her husband Orestes' coldness; the confusions created by the dancers Zazá, Eduarda, Sueli, Eduarda and Amália; Caveirinha's moves on the virgin Madalena; and the triangle between Joséphine, Juca and the singer Lulu Kelly.

== Exhibition ==
Initially, the premiere was scheduled for June 16, 1989, but the date was postponed due to problems with the cast and text. The first chapter of Kananga Do Japão aired on July 19 of the same year, in the 9:30 p.m. slot on Rede Manchete. On the Saturday of the first week of the show, a summary of all the episodes was released. Presented from Monday to Saturday, its last chapter was shown on March 25, 1990, when it was replaced by Pantanal. The telenovela was repeated twice, on the first occasion from May 21, 1990, to January 18, 1991, from Monday to Saturday, with 209 episodes and, on the second occasion, from March 18 to October 10, 1997, with 149 chapters, from Monday to Friday. In Portugal, it was shown on RTP2, only on Sundays, for four years.

At the end of each chapter, three minutes of documentary footage about the 1930s was shown. The opening vignette was produced by Adolpho Rosenthal and divided into four themes: port, war, dance and countryside, based on Cândido Portinari's work, O Lavrador de Café. It depicts the events at the Grêmio Recreativo Familiar Kananga do Japão under the sound of "Minha", performed by the singer Misty.

== Cast ==
Actor/Actress	Character
Christiane Torloni	Dora Tavares
Raul Gazolla	Alex Ferreira
Tônia Carrero	Letícia Lima Viana
Giuseppe Oristanio	Danilo Lima Viana
Elaine Cristina	Lizete L'amour
Carlos Alberto	Francisco Lima Viana (Chico)
Júlia Lemmertz	Sílvia Lima VIana
Rosamaria Murtinho	Joséphine Tavares
Rubens Corrêa	Epílogo Tavares
Paulo Castelli	Henrique Tavares
Cristiana Oliveira	Hannah Franco
Tarcísio Filho	Júlio Tavares
Ana Beatriz Nogueira	Alzira Tavares
Carlos Eduardo Dolabella	Orestes Guimarães
Lúcia Alves	Daisy Guimarães
Sérgio Viotti	Saul Franco
Riva Nimitz	Eva Franco
Yara Lins	Zulmira Tavares
Haroldo Costa	Dr. Juca Ferreira
Zezé Motta	Lulu Kelly
Ewerton de Castro	Saraiva
Nelson Xavier	Caveirinha
Via Negromonte	Madalena Tavares
Ernesto Piccolo	Vado Tavares
Antônio Pitanga	Delegado Bira
Chico Diaz	Olegário
Daniella Perez	Eduarda
Tamara Taxman	Zazá
Solange Couto	Ritinha
Elisa Lucinda	Sueli
Adriana Figueiredo	Amália
Vicente Barcellos	Youschua Franco
Buza Ferraz	Dudu
Zeni Pereira	Maria Santa
Maria Alves	Isaura
Ruy Rezende	Jorge
Karen Acioly	Clotilde
Paulo Barbosa	Sinhô
Sandro Solviat	Ataliba

=== Special appearances ===
Actor/Actress	Character
Cláudio Marzo	Noronha
Paulo Gorgulho	Capitão Juarez Távora
Bete Coelho	Lígia Prestes
Maurício do Valle	Torquato
Sérgio Britto	Teodoro
Marcos Wainbeg	Berger Ewest
Betty Erthal	Elisa
Betina Vianny	Olga Benário Prestes
Cassiano Ricardo	Luiz Carlos Prestes
Roberto Bomtempo	Bodoque
Maria Sílvia	Brígida
Carlinhos de Jesus	Duque
Jonas Mello	Cesário Campos Alvarenga
Ivan Setta	Graciliano Ramos
Breno Bonin	Plínio Salgado
Fernando Eiras	Mário Reis
Gerson Brener	Dr. Guilherme
Ricardo Blat	Enéas Machado
Edwin Luisi	Dr. Renato Braga
Abrahão Farc	Natan Xavier
Marcos Oliveira	Aparício Torelli
Luiz Salém	Dr. Campos La Paz
Marília Barbosa	Aracy Cortes
Henriette Morineau	Odília
Nildo Parente	Delegado Frota Aguiar
Antônio Pompêo	Pai Alabá
Silveirinha	Valdemar Nóia Luquequi
Clemente Viscaíno	Beijo Vargas
Haroldo de Oliveira	Ernesto
Pratinha	César Ladeira
Jorge Lafond	Madame Satã
Sebastião Lemos	Ary Barroso
Paulo Reis	Capitão Eduardo Gomes
Caíque Ferreira	Francisco Alves

== Music ==
The telenovela's opening theme, "Minha", is performed by the singer Misty. The soundtrack also features artists such as Elis Regina, for "Aquarela do Brasil", Evandro Mesquita, for "Gago apaixonado" and the progressive rock band Sagrado Coração da Terra, for "Passional". These songs were included on a CD produced by Guto Graça Mello, Tatiana Lohmann, Lia Sampaio and Celso Lessa.

Márcia Cezimbra, a journalist at Jornal do Brasil, didn't like the songs chosen for the piece: "[the songs] that are aired are not from the period in which the telenovela is set, [it's] a soundtrack that's off the beaten track".

No.	Title	Music	Length
1.	"Dorinha, meu amor"	Luiz Melodia	2:42
2.	"Uma noite a mais"	Cláudya	4:58
3.	"Canção pra inglês ver"	Afrodite se Quiser	2:26
4.	"My Funny Valentine"	Nouvelle Cuisine	3:07
5.	"Gago apaixonado"	Evandro Mesquita	3:05
6.	"Minha"	Misty	1:31
7.	"Gosto que me enrosco"	Mário Reis	3:57
8.	"Passional"	Sagrado Coração da Terra	3:07
9.	"Aquarela do Brasil"	Elis Regina	3:45
10.	"Pela décima vez"	Angela Ro Ro	2:33
11.	"Coisas nossas"	Garganta Profunda	3:39
12.	"Fly Away and End Credits"	James Horner	6:02

== Release and repercussions ==
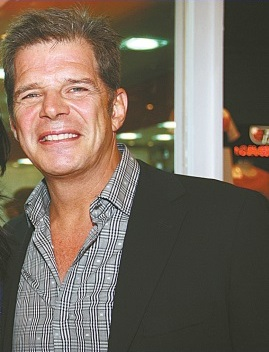
Raul Gazolla played the role of Alex.

=== Audience ===
In Rio de Janeiro, Manchete's main audience, Kananga do Japão scored 20 points in its first chapter, representing an increase of 14 points compared to the previous premiere, Olho por Olho, which scored 6. Throughout its run, the telenovela maintained an audience of between 15 and 25 points in the state. The average in the city of Rio de Janeiro was 20 points, considered a success above expectations. However, in São Paulo, where the broadcaster didn't have much presence, Kananga do Japão premiered with 6 points, tripling the result of the previous telenovela's premiere, and had an overall average of 5 points.

=== Retrospective evaluation ===
Veja magazine commented shortly after the premiere: "At this early stage, it was clear that the directors intended to use cinematographic style shots, escaping the routine of cameras very close to the characters whenever there is dialogue [...] Rede Globo evidently perceives the telenovela as a major competitor and considers it possible for Manchete to repeat the success of Dona Beija, from 1986".

A columnist for Última Hora positively evaluated the story and commented that "what Rede Manchete has been trying to do in terms of plastic and artistic quality to make Kananga do Japão a telenovela on the level of Rede Globo's best productions is commendable, [it's] a healthy and necessary dispute because hundreds of jobs are being created behind it". Linda Monteiro, from the same newspaper, analyzed Raul Gazzola: "young, handsome, with good body expression, [has] great intimacy with dance, a figure of a typical bohemian rascal [with] the look, the voice, the mannerisms, the body swagger and the naughty smile of a gentleman."

Braulio Tavares, from Jornal do Brasil, said: "the high-quality production, the impeccable visuals, the historical and social background, the skillful handling of lights and cameras, the fluid choreography, the convincing costumes and sets [are all there]". However, journalist Fernando de Morais criticized the dance, saying that "the ballet montage is an insult; Olga Benário, who was Jewish but didn't attach any importance to it, would shout cheers to Israel. And the German and American producers who were interested in the film blackmailed me to shoot a police-only tape. I didn't authorize it".

Reporter Arthur Laranjeira, from O Dia, said that "[there are] beautiful images, [with] excellent reconstitution work of the 1930s revealed in perfect make-up, costumes [and] sets [...] Guilherme Pereira [proved to be] concerned with every detail of the many faces he worked with, modifying them during the various phases of the telenovela". He also evaluated the actors and their performances: "Raul Gazzola [became] a new sex symbol. Cristiane Torloni's beauty has never been better shown in any other show. Tônia Carrero has been showing good moments, facing dangerous scenes without falling into ridicule."

Journalist Regina Rito criticized the nude scene of the character Dora: "she appears with her breasts entirely naked!" However, one viewer from Rio de Janeiro sent a letter of disagreement: "If the scene were from the telenovela Tieta, would it deserve censorship or would Isadora Ribeiro's breasts and the boy's buttocks at the end of the telenovela Brega & Chique be absolutely normal? Attitudes like this reinforce an iniquitous stance, that of a journalist who pits opinion and taste against the work of serious people."

=== Awards and nominations ===
The APCA trophy, an award organized by the São Paulo Association of Art Critics, nominated Kananga do Japão in six categories for the television section, which won all of them. Rodrigo Cid, Sérgio Perricone and Gil Haguenauer were selected for best set design, Guto Graça Mello for best soundtrack, Colmar Diniz received the award for best costume design, Adolph Rosenthal and Tony Cid Guimarães were chosen for best opening and Cristiana Oliveira won in the category of best female revelation. The Press Trophy, held annually, nominated it for best telenovela and selected Raul Gazzola to compete for revelation, but they didn't win.

== See also ==
- Rede Manchete
