= Alexandre Lippiani =

Brazilian actor (1964–1997)

- Born: September 11, 1964; Belo Horizonte, Minas Gerais, Brazil
- Died: May 24, 1997 (aged 32); Rio de Janeiro, Rio de Janeiro, Brazil
- Occupation: Actor
- Years active: 1987–1997

Alexandre Lippiani (September 11, 1964 – May 24, 1997) was a Brazilian actor who reached fame in the early to mid-1990s acting in telenovelas and miniseries by Rede Globo and the now-defunct Rede Manchete. His most remembered role was as the priest Eurico in the 1996 telenovela Xica da Silva.

== Biography ==
Lippiani was born in Belo Horizonte on September 11, 1964, later moving to Rio de Janeiro. He debuted on Rede Globo's 1987 telenovela Sassaricando, and continued to work with them until 1990, when he left for Rede Manchete to act in Pantanal. After briefly returning to Globo for the telenovelas Sonho Meu and Explode Coração, he once again left them to return to Manchete, where in 1996 he acted in Xica da Silva. Around the same time, he provided the voice of Sheriff Woody in the Brazilian Portuguese dub of the first Toy Story film, and also voiced actor Dean Cain on the first two seasons of the series Lois & Clark: The New Adventures of Superman (after his death, he was replaced by Marco Ribeiro and Guilherme Briggs respectively).

Lippiani's final credited role was in the 1997 film For All - O Trampolim da Vitória.

== Death ==
He died on May 24, 1997, at the age of 32, after losing control of his car and crashing it into a street light.

== Personal life ==
He was the cousin of fellow actor Rodolfo Bottino.
