= Roberto Frota =

Brazilian actor (1939–2024)

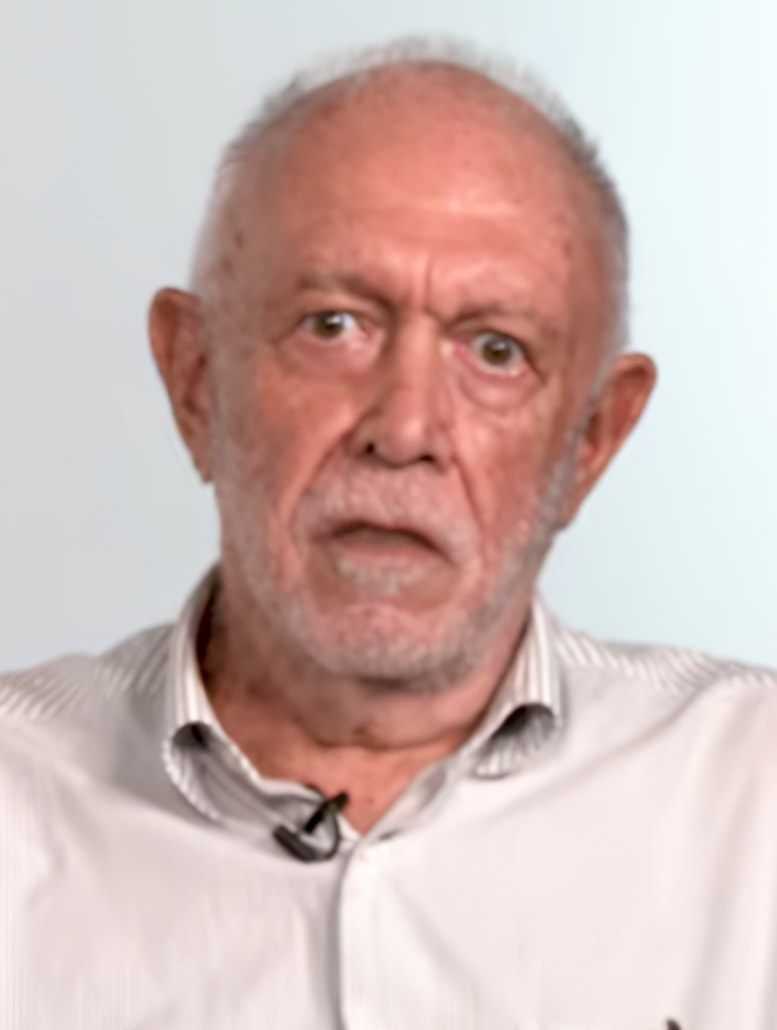
- Born: Roberto de Castro Moreira; 26 January 1939; Rio de Janeiro, Brazil
- Died: 24 September 2024 (aged 85); Rio de Janeiro, Brazil
- Occupations: Actor; Director; Producer; Writer; Theatre screenwriter
- Years active: 1969–2024
- Children: 3

Roberto de Castro Moreira (26 January 1939 – 24 September 2024), better known as Roberto Frota, was a Brazilian actor, director, producer, writer, and theatre screenwriter. He began his career in 1969.

== Biography ==
=== Early life ===
Frota was born in Hospital Alemão, in the Tijuca neighborhood of Rio de Janeiro, at that point Brazil's capital. He was the first child of José Arthur da Frota Moreira and Zuleika de Castro Moreira. José Arthur was a lawyer who had been recently named a state attorney with the state of São Paulo and later became a federal deputy. Zuleika was a student of the National School of Fine Arts, as well as a painter and poet.

As a result of his father's work and political aspirations, his family later moved to the city of São Paulo. Roberto's younger brother Carlos was born when he was two years old. They lived in the Vila Mariana neighborhood until Roberto was fourteen, when his mother died; after this, both he and his brother moved to Rio de Janeiro.

His father later remarried, and when Roberto was 17, his half-sister Ana Silvia was born. His family moved back to São Paulo, but Roberto chose to remain in Rio de Janeiro, continuing his education at Andrews and Juruena colleges. In 1963, within a span of just 28 days, both his father and his brother died.

=== Career ===
In 1968, he matriculated in theatre courses with Maria Clara Machado, founder of Teatro Tablado, leading to his acting and theatre directing debuts. He would go on to act professionally in around 50 plays, among those including Cemitério de Automóveis, Peer Gynt, Castro Alves Pede Passagem, O Interrogatório, Trair e Coçar, É Só Começar!, and O Cordão Umbilical. With a 1971 performance of Peer Gynt, he performed with Stênio Garcia, Jonas Bloch, Ariclê Perez, Ewerton de Castro, and Ricardo Blat.

He participated in various Brazilian television series such as: Tieta, Pedra sobre Pedra, Corpo Santo, Mulheres Apaixonadas, Riacho Doce, Ana Raio e Zé Trovão, Chiquititas, and A Terra Prometida. With films, he acted in A Queda e Sombras de Julho.

In 1992, wrote the original argument of the feature film If I Were You, which was a massive hit in Brazil. Frota later made his debut in literature with the book "Mão de Flor", through publisher Editora Viseu.

Roberto Frota began to travel throughout Brazil for 8 years with actor Marcos Wainberg, presenting performances of "Diálogo dos Pênis", considered a critical and public success.

=== Personal life and death ===
In 1968, at 29 years old, Frota married his first wife, speech-language pathologist Ana Maria Frota, with whom he had two children, Verônica and Thiago. Frota later married actress Ângela Vieira, from 1983 to 1997, with whom they had a daughter: Nina. He was married again to lawyer Márcia Prado from 2008 to 2014.

After fighting lung cancer for more than a year, Frota died due to a bout of pneumonia in Rio de Janeiro, on 24 September 2024. He was 85.

== Filmography ==
=== Television ===
Year	Title	Role	Notes
1973	Jerônimo, O Herói Do Sertão	Rogério	
1974	O Semideus		Guest appearance
1976	Vejo a Lua no Céu	José	
1977	Chico City		Various roles
1979	Carga Pesada		Episode: "Vingança repartida
1980	Carga Pesada		Episode: "Frete carioca"
1982	Sitio do Picapau Amarelo		Episode: "Um Estranho Conto de Fadas"
1982	Viva o Gordo		Guest appearance
1982	Quem Ama não Mata	Delegado	
1983	Chico Anysio Show	Various roles	1983-1986
1984	O Bem-Amado		Guest appearance
1985	Ti Ti Ti	Marido de Maria Valéria	
1987	Corpo Santo	Delegado Portinho	
1987	Bambolê	Pai de Alligator	
1988	Olho por Olho	Dudu	
1988	Vale Tudo	Santana	
1989	Tieta	Leôncio	
1990	Barriga de Aluguel	Juiz	
1990	Riacho Doce	Juca	
1990	Araponga	Faisão Dourado	
1990	Fronteiras do Desconhecido	Capitão do Mato	Episode: "Escrava Anastácia"
1990	A história de Ana Raio e Zé Trovão	Chico	
1991	Filhos do Sol	Vadico	
1991	Os Homens Querem a Paz	Joca da Amália	
1992	Pedra sobre Pedra	Heraldo	
1994	74.5 - Uma onda no ar	Jairo	
1995	Tocaia Grande	Mestre Rosa	
1996	Anjo de Mim	Crispim	
1997	Você Decide	Alcântara	1 episode
1997	Malhação	Simões	Guest appearance
1997	A Sétima Bala	Jairo Queiroz	
1997	Por Amor	Admirador de Sirléia	Guest appearance
1998	Corpo Dourado	Romão	
1998	Meu Bem Querer	Juiz	Guest appearance
1998	A História de Ester	Hamã	
1999	Suave Veneno	Dr. Almeida	
1999	Vila Madalena	Vanfredo	
1999	O Belo e as Feras	Alves	Episode: Infeliz no jogo, Infeliz no amor
1999	Sitcom	Severino	3 episodes
1999	Mulher	Luis	Episode: Bolero
1999	Terra Nostra	Gaetano, diretor do Orfanato	
2000	Aquarela do Brasil	Ribeiro	
2001	Porto dos Milagres	Dr. Mendanha	
2002	Coração de Estudante	Empresário	Guest appearance
2003	A Casa das Sete Mulheres	Coronel Vilas Boas	
2003	Mulheres Apaixonadas	Lobato	
2004	Chocolate com Pimenta	Dr. Eusébio	
2005	Prova de Amor	Seu Ferreira	
2006	JK	Coronel Fulgêncio de Souza Santos	
2006	Páginas da Vida	Dr. Marco Aurélio Vilaça	
2007	Amazônia, de Galvez a Chico Mendes	Pedro Freire	
2007	Malhação	Gabriel Dias	
2007	Desejo Proibido	Juiz Roberval	
2008	Poeira em Alto Mar	Cícero de Nassau	
2008	Ciranda de Pedra	Almeida	
2008	Negócio da China	Dr. Epaminondas Duarte	
2008	Chamas da Vida	Pai do Lipe	
2009	A Lei e o Crime	Reinaldo Dias	
2009	Caminho das Índias	Delegado Bandeira	Guest appearance
2009	Caras & Bocas	Juiz no caso da guarda de Xico	Episode: "24 de dezembro"
2011	Sansão e Dalila	Manoá	
2012	Aventuras do Didi	Pretendente	Episode: "16 de setembro"
2013–14	Chiquititas	José Ricardo Almeida Campos	
2015	Santo Forte	Manoel	
2016	Detetives do Prédio Azul	Mago Merlin	Episode: "A Varinha Mágica"
2016	A Terra Prometida	Rei Durgal	
2017	Tempo de Amar	José Figueira (Figueirinha)	
2018	Conselho Tutelar	Tavares	
2018	Sob Pressão	Arruda	Episode: "09 de outubro"
2019	Éramos Seis	Dr. Vicente	
2019	Amor de Mãe	Seu Onofre	Episode: "2 de dezembro"
2021	Verdades Secretas II	Detetive Marques	
2023	Vai na Fé	Desembargador Alves	Episode: "8 de março"
2023	Amor Perfeito	Desembargador Jacó	Episode: "30 de março"
2023	Terra e Paixão	Dr. Arnon	Episode: "03 de julho"

=== Film ===
Year	Title	Role
1970	A Dança das Bruxas	Bruxo
1972	O Grande Gozador	
1978	A Queda	Assessor
1995	Sombras de Julho	Horácio
2002	The Forest	Lourenço
2007	Inesquecível	Juiz de paz
2014	The Pilgrim	Chefe de redação
2016	Depois Que Te Vi	Tio

=== Theatre ===
Year	Title
1969	CAMALEÃO NA LUA
1970	MAROQUINHAS FRÚ-FRÚ
1970	The Good Person of Szechwan
1970	CEMITÉRIO DE AUTOMÓVEIS
1971	Peer Gynt
1972	CASTRO ALVES PEDE PASSAGEM
1972	O INTERROGATÓRIO
1973	Three Sisters
1973	O CORDÃO UMBILICAL
1974	FERNANDO PESSOA
1975	A RAINHA MORTA
1977	PANO DE BOCA
1977	O CASO OPPENHEIMER
1980	VESTIDO DE NOIVA
1980	A RESISTÊNCIA
1980	BODAS DE PAPEL
1981	O MELHOR DOS PECADOS
1982	E AGORA, HERMÍNIA?
1983	King Lear
1984	A PROCLAMAÇÃO DA REPÚBLICA
1984	ENCOURAÇADO BOTEQUIM
1985	UM BEIJO, UM ABRAÇO, UM APERTO DE MÃO
1987	TRAIR E COÇAR É SÓ COMEÇAR
1993	CIDADÃO
1994	O REI PASMADO E A RAINHA NUA
1995	VESTIDO DE NELSON
1996	SERIA TRÁGICO SE NÃO FOSSE CÔMICO
1997	Don Juan
1998	TODOS OS HERÓIS ESTÃO MORTOS
1999	EM NOME DO FILHO
1999	Hamlet
2000	BONITINHA MAS ORDINÁRIA
2001	AMANTE S.A.
2001-2013	DIÁLOGO DOS PÊNIS
2011	AGREDIR FUNCIONÁRIO PÚBLICO NO EXERCÍCIO DA FUNÇÃO É CRIME
2012	A CANTORA CARECA
2015	El acompañamiento
