= Simplemente María =

Simplemente María (Simply Maria) may refer to:

- Simplemente María (1969 telenovela), Peruvian
- Simplemente María (1972 telenovela), Venezuelan
- Simplemente María (1989 telenovela), Mexican
- Simplemente María (2015 telenovela), Mexican telenovela based on Simplemente María of 1989 and produced by Ignacio Sada
