= Anjo Mau =

Anjo Mau may refer to:

- Anjo Mau (1976 TV series), a Brazilian telenovela
- Anjo Mau (1997 TV series), based on the 1976 TV series
