= Wainberg =

Wainberg is a surname. Notable people with the surname include:

- Bella Iljinitschna Wainberg (1932–2010), Russian prehistorian
- Marcos Wainberg (born 1949), Brazilian actor
- Mark Wainberg (1945–2017), Canadian HIV/AIDS researcher
