= Benedito Ruy Barbosa =

Brazilian screenwriter and author (1931–2026)

- Born: 17 April 1931; Gália, São Paulo, Brazil
- Died: 7 July 2026 (aged 95); São Paulo, Brazil
- Spouse: Marilene Leonor Barbosa (m. 1958; died 2014)
- Children: 4
- Relatives: Ely Barbosa (brother)

Benedito Ruy Barbosa (17 April 1931 – 7 July 2026) was a Brazilian screenwriter, journalist, and author of many Brazilian telenovelas. He made his debut as a television writer with Somos Todos Irmãos, which aired on TV Tupi in 1966. Barbosa continued to write for a variety of television networks until he signed as a writer for TV Globo in 1976. He left Globo in 1990 for TV Manchete; after writing Pantanal for Manchete, he returned to TV Globo where he wrote Renascer (1993) and O Rei do Gado (1996). In 2008, he was awarded an Ordem do Mérito Cultural by the Brazilian Ministry of Culture.

Barbosa died from complications of chronic kidney disease on 7 July 2026, at the age of 95.

== Early life and career beginnings ==
Benedito Ruy Barbosa was born on 17 April 1931 in Gália, São Paulo, to Otávio Elias Barbosa, a journalist, typesetter, and bookstore owner who ran the A Voz de Vera Cruz paper, and Aurora Medeiros Barbosa. Barbosa grew up in Vera Cruz and had four younger siblings, including comics artist Ely Barbosa. Otávio Elias died of a heart attack in 1942, when Barbosa was twelve. Barbosa began working soon after; his first job was as an assistant bookkeeper.

When he was seventeen, Barbosa and his family moved to São Paulo, where he began working as an accountant for several years as well as selling vegetables, newspapers, and working as a cleaner. He also worked in Maringá, Paraná. As a young adult he turned to journalism, first finding employment as a proofreader for O Estado de S. Paulo in 1954. Barbosa then went on to work as a reporter for Última Hora, Manchete, Correio Paulistano, and Diários Associados.

== Career ==
Barbosa wrote his book, Fogo Frio, inspired by the time he had spent living in Paraná; it was turned into a play in 1959. Performed at the Teatro de Arena and directed by Augusto Boal, the adaptation won an award from the São Paulo Association of Art Critics and started his career in playwrighting. His first telenovela was Somos Todos Irmãos, which aired in 1966 on TV Tupi. He went on to write shows for multiple different networks, such as O Morro dos Ventos Uivantes (1967), Meu Filho, Minha Vida (1967), A Última Testemunha (1968), and Algemas de Ouro (1969). With Benjamin Cattan, he returned to TV Tupi and wrote Simplemente María, which aired in 1970 and 1971. The majority of episodes of Simplemente María are lost.

Barbosa began working for TV Globo in the 1970s; he wrote the 1971 series Meu Pedacinho de Chão for TV Globo and TV Cultura. In 1976, he began writing under contract for TV Globo, writing on shows such as Sítio do Picapau Amarelo and writing telenovelas including À Sombra dos Laranjais (1976), based on a play by Viriato Correia, and Cabocla(1979). During this time, he also wrote Pé de Vento (1980) and Os Imigrantes (1981) for TV Bandeirantes; while Os Imigrantes became popular in Brazil, Pé de Vento was lost. He adapted Maria Dezonne Pacheco Fernandes's 1950 novel, Sinhá Moça, for television in 1986. About the lives of Black Brazilians and emancipated slaves, Barbosa's adaptation took a less "romantic" view of the period than did the novel. Taking eight characters from the book, he created an additional thirty for the series.

He left TV Globo in 1990 and began working for TV Manchete; his last show with Globo was Vida Nova (1988), a continuation of Os Imigrantes. Barbosa's first show with Manchete was Pantanal (1990), a pro-environment show about the Pantanal region in Brazil which Barbosa hoped would encourage people to preserve the wetlands. Barbosa first came up with the idea for the show in 1982, though it was rejected by TV Globo. He returned to the network in 1993 to continue exploring the themes of rural living, writing about cocoa farming in Ilhéus in Renascer (1993) and about land distribution in Brazil for O Rei do Gado (1996). As a result of the messages in O Rei do Gado , which Barbosa described as resulted in "rooting for the landless", landowners threatened to sue him.

Barbosa unsuccessfully sued Sistema Brasileiro de Televisão in 2008 to prevent the station from airing re-runs of Pantanal, which it had purchased from TV Manchete. That same year, he was awarded an Ordem do Mérito Cultural by the Brazilian Ministry of Culture.

In 2016, the show Velho Chico, created by Barbosa alongside his daughter Edmara Barbosa and grandson Bruno Luperi, aired on TV Globo. At the premier, Barbosa spoke negatively about gay characters in telenovelas, saying he did not think stories about same-sex attraction were appropriate for parents to show to their children. TV Globo declined to comment on his remarks and the station and his family decided that Barbosa would not speak publicly on the issue again.

His grandson, Luperi, remade Renascer in 2024.

== Personal life ==
Barbosa was married for 54 years to actress Marilene Barbosa. He had four children, including screenwriters Edmara Barbosa and Edilene Barbosa. His grandchildren include the screenwriter Bruno Luperi. He was a São Paulo FC fan.

=== Health issues and death ===
Barbosa was diagnosed with chronic kidney disease and moved from his home in Sorocaba to the city of São Paulo to receive healthcare. In May 2025, he was treated at the Hospital do Coração in for kidney failure; he was hospitalized the following January for 19 days for a urinary tract infection associated with his kidney failure. He died at São Paulo from complications of the disease on 7 July 2026, at the age of 95. Various actors, musicians, and writers who had worked with Barbosa in the past left condolences, including Maria Bethânia, Vanessa Giácomo, Tony Ramos, Zezé Motta, and Lavínia Vlasak.

== Filmography ==
- Somos Todos Irmãos (1966)
- O Morro dos Ventos Uivantes (1967)
- Meu Filho, Minha Vida (1967)
- A Última Testemunha (1968)
- Algemas de Ouro (1969)
- Simplesmente Maria (1970)
- Meu Pedacinho de Chão (1971)
- O Feijão e o Sonho (1976)
- À Sombra dos Laranjais (1977)
- Cabocla(1979)
- Pé de Vento (1980)
- Os Imigrantes (1981)
- Paraíso (1982–1983)
- Voltei pra Você (1983)
- De Quina pra Lua (1985)
- Sinhá Moça (1986)
- Vida Nova (1988)
- Pantanal (1990)
- Renascer (1993)
- O Rei do Gado (1996)
- Terra Nostra (1999)
- Esperança (2002)
- Mad Maria (2005)
- Sinhá Moça (2006)
- Paraíso (2009)
- Meu Pedacinho de Chão (2014)
- Velho Chico (2016)

== Sources ==
=== Bibliography ===
- Carter, Eli Lee (2018). Reimagining Brazilian Television: Luiz Fernando Carvalho's Contemporary Vision. Latino and Latin American Profiles. Pittsburgh, PA: University of Pittsburgh Press. ISBN 978-0-8229-8296-8. OCLC 1032612116. Full access available to users of The Wikipedia Library.
