= Escalada =

- Genre: Telenovela
- Created by: Lauro César Muniz
- Directed by: Régis Cardoso
- Starring: Tarcísio Meira; Renée de Vielmond; Susana Vieira; Mário Cardoso; Milton Moraes; Ney Latorraca; Nathália Timberg; Sérgio Britto; Sandra Bréa; Lutero Luiz; Cecil Thiré; Oswaldo Louzada; Ênio Santos; Roberto Pirillo; Myriam Pérsia; Júlio César; Kátia D'Angelo; Mário Lago
- Opening theme: "Escalada"
- Country of origin: Brazil
- Original language: Portuguese
- No. of episodes: 197

Production
- Running time: 50 minutes

Original release
- Network: TV Globo
- Release: 6 January – 23 August 1975

Related
- Fogo sobre Terra; Pecado Capital

Escalada is a Brazilian telenovela produced and broadcast by TV Globo. It premiered on 6 January 1975 and ended on 23 August 1975, with a total of 197 episodes in Black and white. It's the fifteenth "novela das oito" to be aired on the timeslot. It is created and written by Lauro César Muniz and directed by Régis Cardoso.

== Plot ==
=== First phase ===
The plot begins in the early 1940s, when the young traveling salesman Antônio Dias arrives in the town of Rio Pardo, in the interior of São Paulo, ready to make it in life. Dynamic and good at business, he begins to annoy coffee grower Armando Alcântara Magalhães, the most powerful man in the region, and the two become enemies. This doesn't stop Antônio from falling in love with Marina, his rival's sister. Although she is also in love, she gives in to her brother's pressure and marries farmer Paschoal Barreto, with whom she goes to live in the United States. Disillusioned, Antônio marries Cândida, owner of the Santa Isabel farm.

The world coffee crisis is underway and the market is looking for new ways to diversify the economy. Antônio decides to invest in cotton production on Cândida's farm. However, his inexperience and Armando's constant opposition lead him to lose the entire crop and go bankrupt, forcing him to sell the property to the enemy. Disillusioned, he leaves Rio Pardo to start life anew elsewhere.

=== Second phase ===
The second phase begins in 1956. Antônio Dias is now a small businessman based in Rio de Janeiro, the capital of the Republic. Now mature, he seems to have lost his old entrepreneurial drive and has become a bitter and frustrated man. He hasn't gotten over the failures of the past and isn't satisfied with the comfortable life he leads with his wife, son Ricardo and father-in-law Arthur. Nor has he ever managed to forget Marina. His marriage to Candida is breaking up and the two of them often talk about separating.

Antônio's life changes when he meets Italian industrialist Valério Fachini, owner of a building materials company. The two become partners and decide to take a chance on an adventure: taking part in the construction of Brasília, the country's future capital. Antônio travels to the site and starts representing Fachini's company in supplying materials for the construction work. When the capital is completed, he is already a wealthy man. In the meantime, Antônio separates from Candida and meets Marina, who has returned from the United States. The two discover that they still love each other.

=== Third phase ===
At the age of seventy, still married to Marina and living on a farm near Rio Pardo, Antônio plots the revenge that will mean his personal fulfillment, and buys Armando's land.

== Cast ==
- Tarcísio Meira - Antônio Dias
- Renée de Vielmond - Marina
- Susana Vieira - Cândida
- Milton Moraes - Armando Magalhães
- Otávio Augusto - Horácio Bastos
- Ney Latorraca - Felipe
- Cecil Thiré - Paschoal Barreto
- Ênio Santos - Artur Freitas Ribeiro
- Nathália Timberg - Fernanda Soares
- Lutero Luiz - Professor Tadeu Oliveira / Miguel Pereira
- Oswaldo Louzada - Gabino Alcântara Magalhães
- Gilda Sarmento - Leonor
- Myriam Pérsia - Celina
- Roberto Pirillo - Sérgio
- Nelson Dantas - Zé Sereno
- André Valli - Zoreia
- Antônio Victor - Father Leopoldo
- Tessy Callado - Marieta
- Jorge Coutinho - Inspector Bastião
- Suzy Arruda - Querubina
- Zeny Pereira - Braulina
- Carlos Duval - Gomes
- Sérgio de Oliveira - Dom Garpar Vieira Sobral
- Paulo Ramos - Dr. Mário
- Rosamaria Murtinho - Arlete
- Débora Duarte - Inês
- Rubens de Falco - Comendador
- Mário Lago - Belmiro Silva
- Rogério Fróes - Dr. Estêvão
- Elza Gomes - Dona Eulália
- Zanoni Ferrite - Valdir Costa
- Sérgio Britto - Valério Facchini
- Sandra Bréa - Roberta
- Leonardo Villar - Alberto Silveira
- Francisco Moreno - Chico Dias
- Maria Helena - Dias Odete
- Rosita Thomaz Lopes - Noêmia
- Vera Gimenez - Carla
- Maria Zilda Bethlem - Ester
- Maria Teresa Barroso - Dona Rosa
- Alfredo Murphy - Candango
- Júlio César - Ricardo (child)
- Cristina Bittencourt - Vivian (child)
- Mário Cardoso - Ricardo
- Kátia D'Angelo - Vivian
- Tony Ferreira - Bruno Carlucci
- Reny de Oliveira - Paula
- Heloísa Helena - Celeste
- Henriqueta Brieba - Vó Dita
- Patricia Bueno - Clementina
