= Ely Barbosa =

Brazilian comics artist

- Born: 1939 Vera Cruz, Brazil
- Died: January 19, 2007 (aged 67–68) São Paulo, Brazil
- Area: Cartoonist
- Notable works: Turma da Fofura and Turma do Cacá
- Awards: Prêmio Angelo Agostini for Master of National Comics
- Children: 1

Ely Barbosa (Vera Cruz, 1939 – São Paulo, January 19, 2007) was a Brazilian comics artist. He started working with comics in the early 1970s with his studio, which produced the Os Trapalhões comic book for Bloch publishing house. In 1976, he released his own characters: Turma da Fofura and Turma do Cacá, initially in children's books, but which, with their success, quickly gained comics, first by the publisher RGE and later by the editora Abril. In the 1980s, new characters emerged, such as Amendoins, Gordo and Patrícia, all with their own comic books, which were published until 1992. Barbosa also produced animations and TV commercials, plays and children's television series with his characters, such as Tutti-Frutti (winner in 1983 of the APCA Television Award for best children's TV show) and Boa Noite, Amiguinhos in the 1980s and Fofura na TV, in the 1990s. In 1994, he was awarded with the Prêmio Angelo Agostini for Master of National Comics, an award that aims to honor artists who have dedicated themselves to Brazilian comics for at least 25 years.

Brother of Benedito Ruy Barbosa.
