= Daniella Perez =

Brazilian actress and ballerina (1970–1992)

- Born: Daniella Ferrante Perez; 11 August 1970; Rio de Janeiro, Brazil
- Died: 28 December 1992 (aged 22); Rio de Janeiro, Brazil
- Cause of death: Murder
- Resting place: Cemetery of São João Batista, Rio de Janeiro
- Occupations: Actress, dancer
- Years active: 1989–1992
- Spouse: Raul Gazolla (m. 1990)
- Mother: Glória Perez

Daniella Ferrante Perez Gazolla (11 August 1970 – 28 December 1992) was a Brazilian actress and dancer.

She worked in telenovelas such as Barriga de Aluguel (1990) and De Corpo e Alma (1992), both written by her mother. She also appeared in O Dono do Mundo (1991).

She was murdered on 28 December 1992 by De Corpo e Alma co-star Guilherme de Pádua and his then wife Paula Thomaz, at the age of 22.

== Life and career ==
Perez was born in Rio de Janeiro to telenovela writer Glória Perez and her husband, an engineer, Luiz Carlos Saupiquet Perez (1940–1994). She had two younger brothers: Rodrigo (born 1972) and Rafael (1977–2002). Her parents were divorced in 1984.

Her interest in the arts began at an early age. At five, she began dancing and as a teenager she was invited to dance professionally for Vacilou, Dançou, a dance company in Rio de Janeiro. Her first role in television was a tango dancer in the Rede Manchete novela Kananga do Japão, and her dance group was invited by Rede Globo to act in the novela Barriga de Aluguel, written by her mother. Perez got the part of Clô, a dancer in the fictional club Copacabana Café.

Her acting got the attention of director Dennis Carvalho, who invited her to star in O Dono do Mundo, where she portrayed Yara, sister of the main character played by Glória Pires. In 1992, Perez was cast in her mother's novela, De Corpo e Alma, as Yasmin, a young woman who was the object of affection of Eri Johnson's character. Yasmin was the sister of the main character of the novela, who was played by Cristiana Oliveira. De Corpo e Alma was her last work. Following her death, the departure of Perez's character was explained as her going to study abroad. Her murderer's character was removed from the story.

On December 25, 1992, she played Mary, mother of Jesus, in a Christmas special, Roberto Carlos Especial, alongside Cássia Kis Magro and Herson Capri.

Perez was married to actor Raul Gazolla, whom she met on the set of Kananga do Japão, from 1990 until her death.

== Death and aftermath ==
Perez was 22 years old when she was murdered by former actor Guilherme de Pádua (her co-star in De Corpo e Alma) and his then-wife, Paula Nogueira Thomaz (now called Paula Nogueira Peixoto). On the night of December 28, 1992, Perez was ambushed and killed by 18 stab wounds that pierced through her neck, lungs, and heart. On the following day, news outlets reported her murder was committed by co-star and actor Guilherme de Pádua. The murder of Daniella outshone the breaking news of Brazilian president Fernando Collor de Mello's impeachment, on December 29.

The reason behind the crime was the envy and frustration Pádua had for not getting the screentime he felt he deserved. After constantly harassing Perez, and trying to get her to guarantee him more scenes in the soap opera, since she was the daughter of the author, who he thought was purposely cutting him off from the novela, Pádua began planning her murder. Coincidentally, in the week prior to her murder, his character had been cut off from several scenes. His wife, Paula Thomáz, was jealous of his interactions with Perez and their love scenes in the soap opera and planned the murder with him.

Pádua and Thomáz were convicted of second degree manslaughter with foul motive and impossibility of defense of the victim and only served 6 of their 19-year closed regime penalty.

The popular indignation that followed this episode resulted in the change of penal legislation thanks to the efforts of Daniella's mother, Gloria Perez, who led a campaign of signatures and managed to pass the first popular bill initiative to become effective law (Law 8.930 / 1994) in the history of Brazil.

In March 2002, Judge Paulo Gustavo Horta ruled that Glória Perez and Raul Gazolla should receive a fine of 500 minimum salaries, or about R$440,000 each, from Guilherme de Pádua and Paula Thomaz. The lawsuit was judged in the second instance by the 7th Civil Chamber of the TJ / RJ. According to the decision, the defendants were also ordered to pay burial and funeral expenses, in the order of five minimum salaries, in addition to the procedural costs and attorney's fees of 10% on the conviction.

After Perez and Gazolla were brought back to court with this action demanding payment, on April 29, 2016, they finally succeeded in winning a lawsuit claiming compensation for moral and material damages against Guilherme de Pádua and Paula Thomaz.

On July 21, 2022, HBO Max launched the documentary series Brutal Pact - The Murder of Daniella Perez (pt:Pacto Brutal - O Assassinato de Daniella Perez), with statements by mother Gloria Perez, the widower Raul Gazolla, friends and colleagues of the actress. Pádua died of a heart attack on November 6, 2022.

== Filmography ==
=== Television ===
Year	Title	Role	Detail	Chain	Notes
1989	Kananga do Japão	Eduarda	Participation	Rede Manchete	
1990	Barriga de Aluguel	Clotilde (Clô)	Recurring character	Rede Globo	
1991	O Dono do Mundo	Yara Maciel	Recurring character	Rede Globo	
1992	De Corpo e Alma	Yasmin Bianchi	Recurring character	Rede Globo	
1992	Roberto Carlos Especial	Mary, mother of Jesus	Main character	Rede Globo	(final appearance)

== Awards and recognitions ==
Year	Award	Category	Nomination	Result
1993	Troféu Imprensa	Revelation of the year	Daniella Perez for her interpretation of Yasmin in De Corpo e Alma	Nominated
