= Sérgio Britto (actor) =

Brazilian actor and film director (1923–2011)

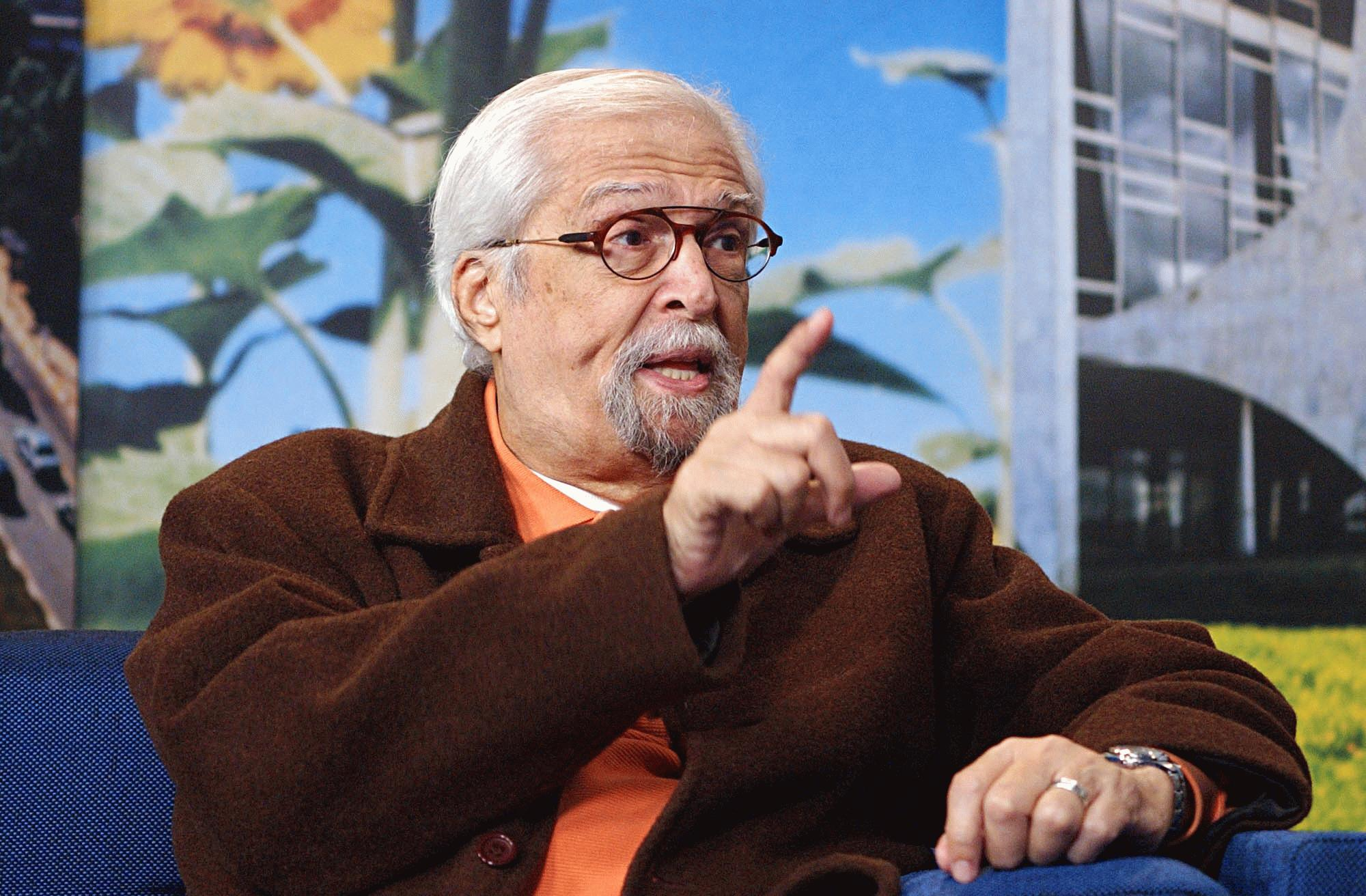
- Born: 29 June 1923; Rio de Janeiro, Brazil
- Died: 17 December 2011 (aged 88); Rio de Janeiro, Brazil
- Occupation: Actor
- Years active: 1951-2008

Sérgio Britto (Brazilian Portuguese: [ˈsɛʁʒi.u ˈbɾitu]; 29 June 1923 – 17 December 2011) was a Brazilian actor and film director. He appeared in more than forty films from 1951 to 2008.

== Filmography ==
=== On film ===
Year	Title	Role	Notes
1951	O Comprador de Fazendas	—N/a	
1952	Modelo 19	—N/a	
1953	Fatalidade	—N/a	Screenwriter: dialogues
1953	Lights Out	—N/a	
1953	Esquina da Ilusão	—N/a	
1953	Uma Vida para Dois	—N/a	Also screenwriter
1953	O Homem dos Papagaios	—N/a	Adaptation and dialogues
1954	Destino em Apuros	—N/a	Also screenwriter
1965	Society Em Baby-Doll	—N/a	
1965	O Desafio	Mário	
1972	A Culpa	Father	
1974	Caingangue	Dr. Ribeiro	
1977	Gordos e Magros	—N/a	
1977	Na Ponta da Faca	Paulo	
1986	O Quebra-Nozes	—N/a	
1991	A Maldição do Sanpaku	Old man	
2006	The Greatest Love of All	Maestro	

=== On television ===
- 1963 A Morta Sem Espelho
- 1963 Pouco Amor Não é Amor
- 1964 Sonho de Amor
- 1964 Vitória
- 1969 Sangue do Meu Sangue - Lieutenant
- 1974 Mulher (episode of Caso Especial)
- 1974 Supermanoela - Jorge
- 1975 Escalada - Valério
- 1976 Anjo Mau - Téo
- 1977 Espelho Mágico - Gastão Cortez / Benito
- 1980 Olhai Os Lírios do Campo - Vicente Cintra
- 1982 Paraíso - Norberto
- 1982 Caso Verdade, Um Engano Mortal - Delegado Alcântara
- 1984 Caso Verdade, Esperança - Genaro
- 1984 Marquesa de Santos - Visconde de Castro
- 1986 Dona Beija - Priest Aranha
- 1989 Kananga do Japão - Teodoro
- 1990 Pantanal - Antero
- 1990 A História de Ana Raio e Zé Trovão - Basílio
- 1991 O Farol - Clemêncio
- 1991 O Fantasma da Ópera - Antônio Medeiros
- 1993 Olho no Olho - Priest João
- 1993 Mulheres de Areia - Psychiatrist
- 1994 Memorial de Maria Moura - Eliseu
- 1996 Xica da Silva - Conde Valadares
- 1997 A Indomada -
- 1997 Direito de Vencer - Giovanni Lucilli
- 1998 Serras Azuis - Barão de Serras Azuis
- 1999 Chiquinha Gonzaga - Marquês de Caxias
- 2000 Vidas Cruzadas - Teodoro
- 2003 Mulheres Apaixonadas - Himself
- 2008 O Natal do Menino Imperador - Dom Pedro II

== As director ==
- 1965 Coração
- 1965 Paixão de Outono (Rede Globo)
- 1965 Ilusões Perdidas (Rede Globo)
- 1965 Um Rosto de Mulher (Rede Globo)
- 1968 O Terceiro Pecado
- 1968 A Muralha (TV Excelsior)
- 1970 E Nós Aonde Vamos? (TV Tupi)
- 1980 O Guarani - Opera (Teatro Municipal do Rio de Janeiro)
- 1981 Prima Belinha
