= De Corpo e Alma (TV series) =

Brazilian telenovela by Glória Perez

- Genre: Telenovela
- Created by: Glória Perez
- Directed by: Roberto Talma
- Starring: Cristiana Oliveira; Tarcísio Meira; Victor Fasano; Beatriz Segall; Carlos Vereza; Betty Faria; José Mayer; Maria Zilda Bethlem; Vera Holtz; Guilherme Leme; Renée de Vielmond; Neusa Borges; Stênio Garcia; Marilu Bueno; Nathália Timberg; Daniella Perez; Fábio Assunção
- Opening theme: "Raio de Luz" by Simone
- Country of origin: Brazil
- Original language: Portuguese
- No. of episodes: 185

Production
- Running time: 50 minutes

Original release
- Network: Rede Globo
- Release: 3 August 1992 – 5 March 1993

De Corpo e Alma (Of Body and Soul in English) is a Brazilian telenovela produced and broadcast by Rede Globo. It premiered on 3 August 1992, replacing Pedra sobre Pedra and ended on 5 March 1993, with a total of 185 episodes. It's the forty sixth "novela das oito" to be aired on the timeslot. It is created by Glória Perez and directed by Roberto Talma.

The soap opera was marked by the murder of Daniella Perez, daughter of the author Glória Perez, and one of the actresses of the soap opera, on 28 December 1992. Daniella was murdered by her co-star Guilherme de Pádua and Paula Thomaz, Pádua's then-wife.

== Cast ==
Actor	Character
Cristiana Oliveira	Paloma Bianchi
Tarcísio Meira	Diogo Santos Varela
Victor Fasano	Joaquim José "Juca" Marcondes
Beatriz Segall	Stella Mendes Peixoto
José Mayer	Carlos Henrique "Caíque" Lopes Jordão
Maria Zilda Bethlem	Beatriz "Bia" Lopes Jordão
Betty Faria	Antônia Santos Varela
Bruna Lombardi	Betina Lopes Jordão
Neusa Borges	Terê
Renée de Vielmond	Helena
Carlos Vereza	Edilson Vidal "Vidal"
Stênio Garcia	Domingos Bianchi
Marilu Bueno	Maria Lúcia "Laci' Bianchi
Nathália Timberg	Nágila Pastore
Eva Todor	Maria Carolina "Calu" Pastore
Guilherme Leme	Agenor "Gino" Pinheiro
Vera Holtz	Simone Guedes
Márcia Rodrigues	Marisa
Daniella Perez	Yasmin Bianchi
Fábio Assunção	Caio Pastore
Lizandra Souto	Patrícia "Patty" Maria Guedes
Hugo Carvana	Agenor Pinheiro
Eri Johnson	Reginaldo Freitas
Tonico Pereira	Vado
Ewerton de Castro	Antônio Guedes "Guedes"
João Vitti	Nando
Hugo Gross	Otávio "Tavinho" Pastore
Carla Daniel	Sheyla Maria
Ida Gomes	Bela Lopes
Aracy Cardoso	Celinha
Márcia Real	Sálvia Lopes
Guilherme de Pádua	Bira
Marcelo Faria	José Alberto "Beto" Guedes
Milton Gonçalves	Juiz de menores
Mário Lago	Veiga (desembargador)
Juliana Teixeira	Verinha
Aron Hassan	Júnior (biological son of Terê and Vado)
Maria Regina	Guiomar Freitas
Maurício Branco	Felipe Santos Varela
Livingstone Trobilio	Beto
Marcelo Picchi	Attílio
Paulette	Inácio
Patrícia Novaes	Aninha
Rejane Goulart	Júlia
Sandro Solviatt	Severino Granjeiro
Eduardo Caldas	Pinguim (biological son of Bia and Caíque)
