= Ewerton de Castro =

- Born: 11 December 1945 (age 79); São Paulo, Brazil
- Occupation: Actor
- Years active: 1967–present
- Children: Talita Castro

Ewerton de Castro (born 11 December 1945) is a Brazilian actor, screenwriter, producer, and director. He is the father of actress Talita Castro. He retired from the arts in 2011 and moved to the United States.

== Career ==
Castro began his career in theatre and participated in more than 25 films, along with various theatrical pieces, as an actor and director, and in telenovelas. He has received an award for best supporting actor for his role as Mário in the 1973 film Anjo Loiro, at the 1973 Festival de Santos. In 2006, he interpreted Martim Afonso de Sousa in Encenação da vila de São Vicente, which took place at Biquinha beach in São Vicente, São Paulo.

In 2011, after appearing in the miniseries A História de Ester, Castro announced that he would be retiring. In 2014, despite his announcement, he would go on to star in the theatre piece O Amor Move o Sol e Outras Estrelas, which made its debut in Cordeirópolis as a way to incentivize theatre performances in the interior of São Paulo state.

== Filmography ==
=== Television ===
Year	Title	Role
1967–69	Sítio do Picapau Amarelo	Visconde de Sabugosa
1972	A Revolta dos Anjos	Raul
1973	Vidas Marcadas	
1975	A Viagem	Alexandre Veloso
1975	Ovelha Negra	Bentinho
1976	O Julgamento	Zé Maria
1976	Xeque Mate	Carlinhos
1977	Éramos Seis	Julio Lemos Filho (Julinho)
1979	Malu Mulher	Beto
1983	Eu Prometo	Roque
1985	Roque Santeiro	Gerson do Vale
1987	O Outro	Vidigal
1988	Vida Nova	Mohamed
1989	Colônia Cecília	José Gariga
1989	Kananga do Japão	Saraiva
1990	Pantanal	Quim
1990	Escrava Anastácia	Padre
1990	Riacho Doce	Silveira
1990	Araponga	Jansen
1992	As Noivas de Copacabana	Bacelar
1992	De Corpo e Alma	Antônio Guedes
1993	Fera Ferida	Genival Gusmão
1995	Sangue do Meu Sangue	Lourenço
1997	Os Ossos do Barão	Luis Eulálio
2001	Os Maias	Manuel Vilaça
2004	A Escrava Isaura	Belchior
2005	Essas Mulheres	Ministro Heródoto Duarte
2006	Prova de Amor	Ele mesmo
2006	Bicho do Mato	Túlio Nogueira Souza
2008	Chamas da Vida	Brito Pimenta
2010	A História de Ester	Mordecai

=== Film ===
Year	Title	Role
1968	O Jeca e a Freira	Cláudio
1968	O Quarto	
1970	As Gatinhas	Bancário
1970	As Armas	
1971	Paixão na Praia	Jairo
1973	Anjo Loiro	Mário
1973	O Último Êxtase	Jorge
1973	A Noite do Desejo	Pedro
1973	As Delícias da Vida	Adolfo
1973	O Último Êxtase	Amigo de Marcelo
1974	As Delícias da Vida	Adolfo
1974	O Poderoso Machão	Horácio
1975	Cada um Dá o que Tem	Agostinho
1976	À Flor da Pele	Toninho
1976	A Noite das Fêmeas	André
1977	Ninfas Diabólicas	
1978	Adultério por Amor	Gustavo
1978	Na Violência do Sexo	Bené
1978	O Estripador de Mulheres	Estripador
1980	Os Rapazes da Difícil Vida Fácil	João
1981	Sexo, Sua Única Arma	Tiago
1981	A Noite das Depravadas	Caçador de Cachorros
1982	Alguém	Pascal
1983	O Médium	
1984	Patriamada	
1987	Rádio Pirata	Carlos
1989	Kuarup	Lauro
1990	Uma Escola Atrapalhada	Anselmo
1995	Nelson	Homem
1998	Caminho dos Sonhos	Padre Atanásio
2003	Maria, Mãe do Filho de Deus	Joaquim
2003	O Príncipe	Marino Esteves
2011	Laços Violados	Flávio Albuquerque

== Theatre ==
- 1971: Peer Gynt, which he performed with Stênio Garcia, Jonas Bloch, Ariclê Perez, Ricardo Blat, and Roberto Frota.
- 2011 - O Santo e a Porca
