= Marcos Wainberg =

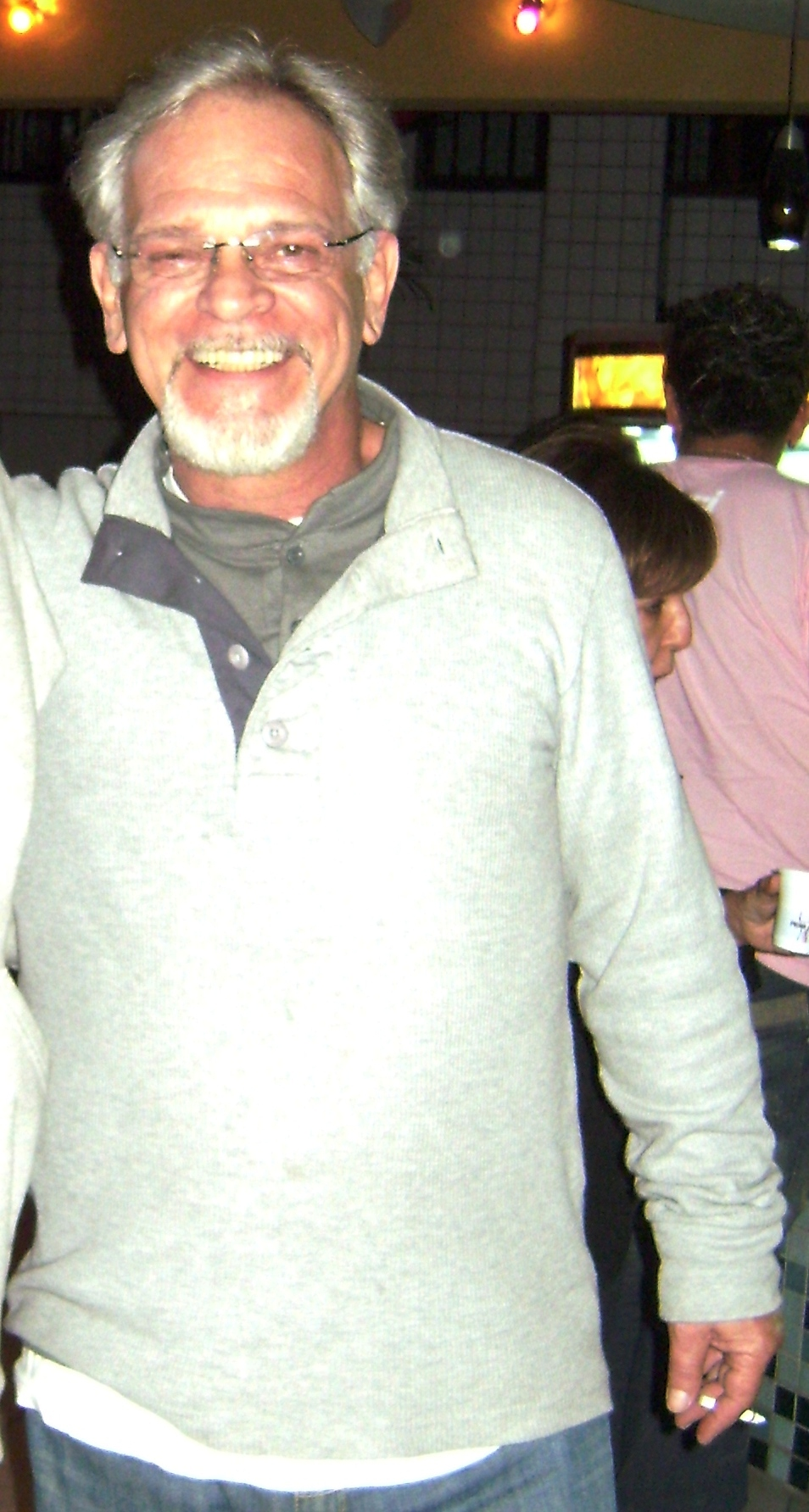
- Born: 27 January 1949 (age 76); Porto Alegre, Rio Grande do Sul, Brazil
- Occupation: Actor
- Years active: 1968–present

Marcos Wainberg (born 27 January 1949) is a Brazilian actor. He is the son of actress Sofia Wainberg. He is most well known for his roles as Vítor in Jamais Te Esquecerei and as Diretor Sherman in the popular Rede Globo sitcom Zorra Total.

Wainberg began to travel throughout Brazil for 8 years with actor Roberto Frota, presenting performances of "Diálogo dos Pênis", considered a critical and public success.

== Filmography ==
=== Television ===
| Year | Title | Role | Notes |
|---|---|---|---|
| 2023 | Seis na Ilha | Vovô Simão | |
| 2003 | Jamais Te Esquecerei | Vítor Ribeiro | |
| 2001-2015 | Zorra Total | Diretor Sherman/Osvaldo/Tio Sam | |
| 1995 | Tocaia Grande | Klaus | |
| 1993 | Família Brasil | Eugênio | |
| 1991 | O Guarani | Bento Simões | |
| 1991 | Na Rede de Intrigas | Dr. Spiller | |
| 1990 | Araponga | Décio | |
| 1990 | Fronteiras do Desconhecido | Orlando Bomfim Jr. | Episode: "Um Grito na Noite" |
| 1988 | Vale Tudo | Bernardo | |
| 1988 | Tarcísio &amp; Glória | Isac | Episode: "Quase Ministro" |
| 1986 | Kananga do Japão | Berger Ewest | |
| 1986 | Anos Dourados | | |
| 1986 | Hipertensão | Tartivo | |
| 1983 | A Festa É Nossa | Various roles | |
| 1982 | Sol de Verão | | |
| 1980 | Planeta dos Homens | Various roles | |
| 1979 | Os Gigantes | Salvador | |
| 1976 | Xeque-mate | Ruy | |
| 1972 | Selva de Pedra | César | |
| 1968 | Legião dos Esquecidos | | |

=== Film ===
| Year | Title | Role |
|---|---|---|
| 2019 | Sete Chaves e uma Mensagem | José Marcario |
| 2018 | Os Olhos de Alice | Alfredo |
| 2018 | Possessões | Dr. Garrido |
| 2015 | O Mistério do Homem de Barro | |
| 2008 | Natale a Rio | Ugo Vita |
| 2007 | Meteoro | Major Arruda |
| 1984 | Mulheres Insaciáveis | Amigo |
| 1983 | Momentos de Prazer e Agonia | Artur |
| 1980 | Os Homens Que Eu Tive | |
| 1979 | A Banda das Velhas Virgens | Raul |
| 1979 | A Pantera Nua | |
| 1977 | Emanuelle Tropical | |
| 1975 | A Extorsão | Nestor |
