= Neila Tavares =

Brazilian actress (1948–2022)

- Born: 18 September 1948; Niterói, Rio de Janeiro, Brazil
- Died: 4 June 2022 (aged 73); Rio das Ostras, Rio de Janeiro, Brazil
- Occupation: Actress

Neila Tavares (18 September 1948 – 4 June 2022) was a Brazilian actress, television presenter and journalist.

== Life and career ==
Born in Niterói, Tavares began her career on stage in 1968 at the Teatro Opinião, and later went to work intensively in films and on television, appearing on some important 1970s telenovelas such as Anjo Mau and Gabriela. She retired from acting in 2013.

She also worked as a presenter for Rede Manchete and TVE Brasil, and as a journalist for a number of publications, notably collaborating with Folha de S.Paulo.

Tavares died after a battle with pulmonary emphysema, on 4 June 2022, at the age of 73.

== Filmography ==
Year	Title	Role	Notes
1969	A Penúltima Donzela		
1969	Memória de Helena		
1970	Um Uísque Antes, Um Cigarro Depois	Maria	(segment "......")
1970	Marcelo Zona Sul	Psychologist	
1970	Bonga, O Vagabundo	Maria Clara	
1972	Ali Babá e os Quarenta Ladrões	Rosinha	
1973	Vai Trabalhar, Vagabundo!		
1973	Amante Muito Louca	Angélica	Voice, Uncredited
1974	A Estrela Sobe	Judith	
1975	As Deliciosas Traições do Amor		(segments "Dois é Bom... Quatro é Melhor" and "O Olhar")
1976	Bandalheira Infernal		
1976	As Desquitadas em Lua-de-Mel		
1977	Um Marido Contagiante		
1978	Os Sensuais - Crônica de Uma Família Pequeno-Burguesa		
1978	O Namorador		
1978	Assim Era a Pornochanchada		
1979	Os Noivos		
1979	O Coronel e o Lobisomem		
1979	As Borboletas Também Amam	Matilde / Esposa de Raimundo-Raimundo's Wife	
2014	Cada Vez Mais Longe	Isaura	
2015	A Família Dionti		(final film role)
