= TV MS =

Television station in Campo Grande, Brazil

TV MS (ZYA 946)
- Campo Grande, Mato Grosso do Sul; Brazil
- Channels: Digital: 32 (UHF); Virtual: 11

Programming
- Affiliations: Record

Ownership
- Owner: Rede MS Integração de Rádio e Televisão Ltda
- Sister stations: FM Cidade

History
- First air date: February 1987
- Former names: TV MS Record (2008–2017)
- Former channel numbers: Analog: 11 (VHF, 1987–2018)
- Former affiliations: Rede Manchete (1987–1995)

Technical information
- Licensing authority: ANATEL
- ERP: 0.8 kW
- Transmitter coordinates: 20°28′22.6″S 54°35′17.8″W

Links
- Public license information: Profile
- Website: diariodigital.com.br

TV MS is a Brazilian television station based in Campo Grande, Mato Grosso do Sul, Brazil. It operates on channel 11 (32 UHF digital), and is affiliated with Record. The station is part of the MS Integração de Rádio e Televisão Network, a communication group belonging to the entrepreneur Ivan Paes Barbosa, together with the Diário Digital portal, the MS Radio Network and the satellite channel AgroBrasil TV.

The station was inaugurated in February 1987 as TV MS, affiliated with Rede Manchete. It became a Record affiliate in 1995.

== History ==
TV MS signed on in February 1987 as a Rede Manchete affiliate. It was the third commercial television station in Campo Grande, after TV Campo Grande (1980) and TV Morena (1965). Its beginning was marked by mass production of local news output, following the pattern of the network at the time, first as MS em Manchete and later as Jornal MS. In 1990, the network's production Pantanal was shot in the state and had received logistical support from the station.

In 1995, the station left Manchete and joined Record. On January 3, 2025, its affiliation contract with the network was renewed for two more years.
