= Paraíso (2009 TV series) =

2009 telenovela from Brazil

- Genre: Telenovela; Romance; Drama
- Created by: Benedito Ruy Barbosa
- Directed by: Rogério Gomes
- Starring: Eriberto Leão; Nathália Dill; Cássia Kis Magro; Mauro Mendonça; Reginaldo Faria; Vanessa Giácomo; Bia Seidl; Alexandre Nero; Cristiana Oliveira; Daniel; Carlos Vereza; Leopoldo Pacheco; Fernanda Paes Leme; Lucy Ramos see more
- Opening theme: Deus e Eu no Sertão by Victor & Leo
- Country of origin: Brazil
- Original language: Portuguese
- No. of episodes: 173

Production
- Production location: Brazil
- Running time: 50 minutes (approx.)

Original release
- Network: Globo
- Release: 16 March – 2 October 2009

Related
- Negócio da China; Cama de Gato

Paraíso (English: Paradise City) is a Brazilian telenovela produced and broadcast by TV Globo from March 16 to October 2, 2009.

== Cast ==
Actor/Actress	Character
Eriberto Leão	José Eleutério Ferrabraz "(Zeca/Devil's son")
Nathália Dill	Maria Rita Godói (Santinha)
Cássia Kis Magro	Mariana Godói
Mauro Mendonça	Antero Godói
Reginaldo Faria	Eleutério Ferrabraz
Vanessa Giácomo	Maria Rosa (Rosinha)
Alexandre Nero	Terêncio
Fernanda Paes Leme	Maria Rosa Albuquerque Medeiros
Daniel	Zé Camilo
Cristiana Oliveira	Zuleika Tavares
Guilherme Winter	Otávio Elias Barbosa
Bia Seidl	Aurora Medeiros
Leopoldo Pacheco	Prefeito Norberto Medeiros
Soraya Ravenle	Josefa Ferrabraz (Zefa)
Kadu Moliterno	Bertoni
Walderez de Barros	Dona Ida
Carlos Vereza	Padre Bento
Cris Vianna	Candinha
Guilherme Berenguer	Ricardo
Juliana Boller	Ana Célia Aires (Aninha)
Lucy Ramos	Cleusinha
José Augusto Branco	Amadeu (Nono)
Aisha Jambo	Leni Peixoto
Laércio Fonseca	Tuta
Genézio de Barros	Alfredo Modesto
Lucci Ferreira	Geraldo Valfrido Gutiérrez
Edney Giovenazzi	Prefeito Paulino
Duda Ribeiro	Mané Corrupio
Alexandre Rodrigues	Tóbi
Cláudio Galvan	Vadinho
Gésio Amadeu	Capita
Cosme dos Santos	Zé do Correio
Carol Abras	Jacira
Mareliz Rodrigues	Nina
Manuela do Monte	Tonha
Jackson Costa	Isidoro
Hugo Gross	Pedro do Posto
João Sabiá	Marcos Miola
Oscar Magrini	Falconi
Larissa Vereza	Irmã Matilde
Anamaria Barreto	Madre Superiora
Lidi Lisboa	Das Dores
Paula Barbosa	Edite
Rodrigo Satter	Tiago
Yassir Chediak	Juvenal
Thommy Schiavo	Chico
Eduardo Di Tarso	Paraná
Marcelo Faria	Eleutério Ferrabraz (young)
Luli Miller	Nena Ferrabraz
Luiz Antônio do Nascimento	Tião (young)

== Awards ==
Premio Tudo De Bom - Jornal O Dia (2009)

- Best actress - Cássia Kiss

Melhores do Ano - 2009

- Best actor - Eriberto Leão

== See also ==
- List of TV Globo telenovelas
