= Renée de Vielmond =

Brazilian actress

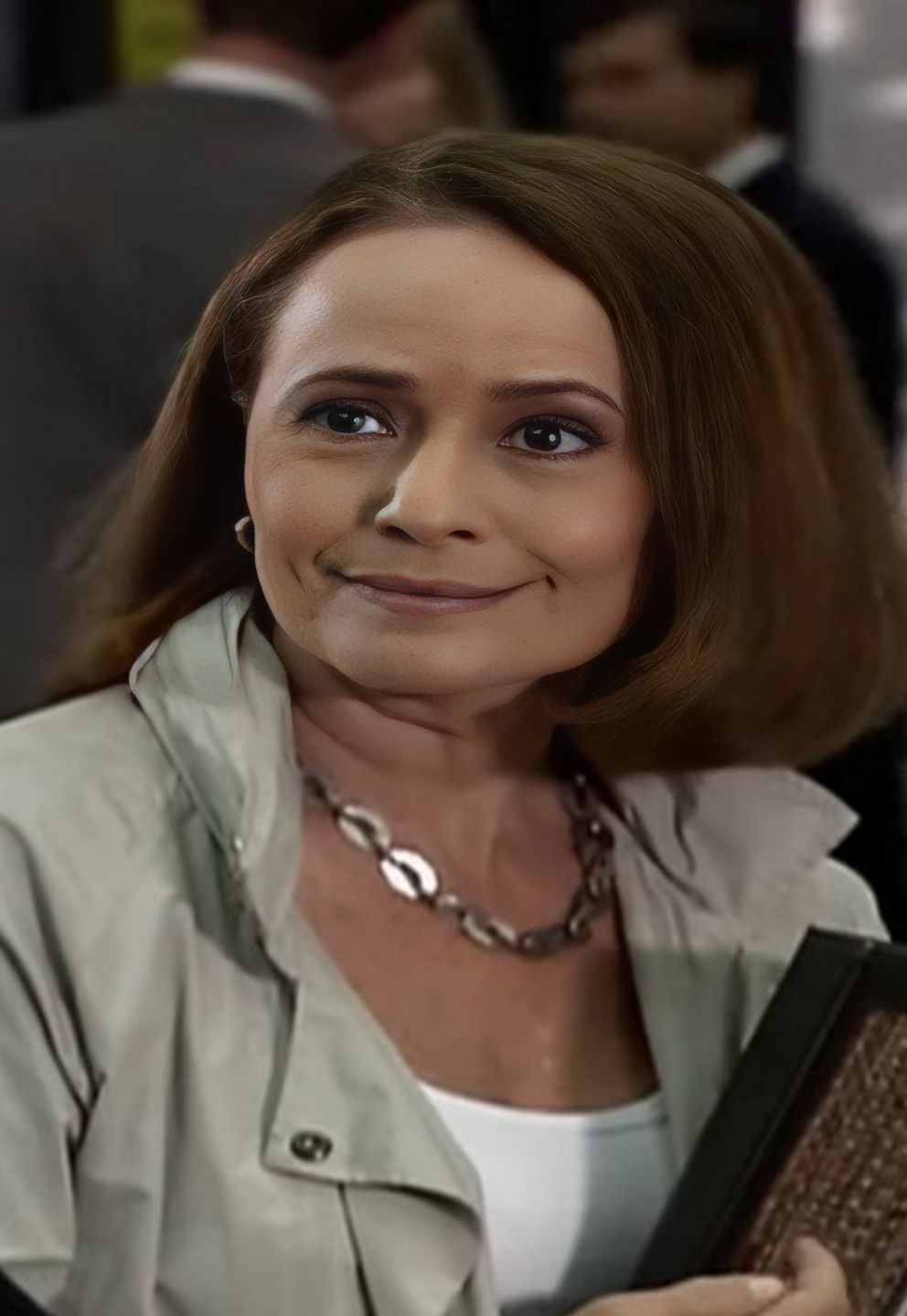
- de Vielmond in 2014
- Born: Renée Le Brun de Vielmond; July 14, 1953 (age 72); Rio de Janeiro, Brazil
- Years active: 1969–1998; 2007
- Spouse: José Wilker (1976–1985)
- Children: 1

Renée Le Brun de Vielmond (born July 14, 1953 in Rio de Janeiro) is a former Brazilian actress.

After numerous successes on TV, such as the romantic Léa in Anjo Mau (1976), the aristocrat Maria Isabel Newman in Brilhante (1981), the photographer Kelly in Eu Prometo (1983), the stylist Fernanda in Novo Amor (1986), and wife deceived Aída de Barriga de Aluguel (1990), Renée returned to television, in the telenovela Gilberto Braga, Paraíso Tropical (2007), after eight years of absence due to Faculty of History.

Renée is the daughter of a Brazilian mother from the state of Alagoas and a French father.

== Filmography ==
=== Television ===
Year	Title	Role	Notes
1971	Meu Pedacinho de Chão	Teacher Juliana	
1972	O Bofe	Débora Pistola	
1972	A Revolta dos Anjos	Lilian	
1973	Jerônimo, o Herói do Sertão	Lígia	Episode: "Fronteiras do Mal"
1973	Jerônimo, o Herói do Sertão	Juma / Soledade	Episode: "Os Caminhos da Esperança"
1975	Escalada	Marina	
1976	Anjo Mau	Léa	
1978	Pecado Rasgado	Stela	
1980	Malu Mulher	Cintia	Episode: "Nossos Casamentos, Hoje"
1981	Amizade Colorida	Sônia	Episode: "Das Dificuldades de Ser Homem"
1981	Plantão de Polícia	Nininha	Episode: "O Crime da Letra M"
1981	Brilhante	Maria Isabel Newman Carvalho	
1983	Moinhos de Vento	Valentina	
1983	Guerra dos Sexos	Dolores	Special participation
1983	Eu Prometo	Kelly Romani (Celina Romani)	
1986	Novo Amor	Fernanda	
1988	Olho por Olho	Bárbara Zimmer	
1990	Barriga de Aluguel	Aída Baronni	
1992	De Corpo e Alma	Helena	
1993	Você Decide		Episode: "O Filho da Outra"
1994	Pátria Minha	Marininha (Marina Araújo Garcia de Aboim)	
1995	Explode Coração	Beth (Elizabeth)	
1997	Malhação	Lorena	Season 3; Episodes: "July 23–25, 1997"
1998	Mulher	Sônia	Episódio: "O Princípio de Tudo"
2007	Paraíso Tropical	Ana Luísa Cavalcanti	

=== Films ===
- 1969 - Em Compasso de Espera - Cristina
- 1978 - Batalha dos Guararapes - Ana Paes
- 1981 - Filhos e Amantes - Ruth
- 1981 - Eros, o Deus do Amor - Ana III
- 1991 - Os Bigodes da Aranha - Lady X
- 2002 - Brilhante
