= Buza Ferraz =

Brazilian actor and theater producer

- Born: Alberto Paulo Ferraz; May 3, 1950; Rio de Janeiro, Brazil
- Died: April 3, 2010 (aged 59); Rio de Janeiro, Brazil
- Other name: Buza Ferraz
- Occupations: Actor director author producer
- Years active: 1969–2010

Alberto Paulo Ferraz (May 3, 1950 – April 3, 2010), known simply as Buza Ferraz, was a Brazilian actor and director.

== Biography ==
Buza Ferraz was born in the city of Rio de Janeiro in 1950. A director linked to group theater and collective creation in the 1970s and early 1980s, he founded and directed the groups Companhia Tragicômica Jaz-o-Coração and Pessoal do Cabaré.

He made his television debut in 1972, in the soap opera Selva de Pedra, broadcast by TV Globo and written by Janete Clair. That same year, he played Regina Duarte's Jewish fiancé in Caso Especial. In 1974, he appeared in Rede Globo's soap opera O Rebu, playing the character Cauê, with whom the millionaire Conrad Mahler, played by Ziembinski, was platonically in love. In the script, written by Bráulio Pedroso, the millionaire murders Cauê's girlfriend out of jealousy, which becomes the great mystery of the plot. But the story was censored by Military dictatorship. It was the first time that the main character in a Brazilian soap opera was homosexual, the first narrative to address the theme had been Assim na Terra como no Céu, with the character Rodolfo Augusto, played by Ary Fontoura.

In the 1980s, he appeared in the soap operas Brilhante and Final Feliz, as well as making guest appearances in series such as Carga Pesada. In 1984, he moved to Rede Manchete, where he participated in two miniseries, Marquesa de Santos and Santa Marta Fabril S.A.. The following year, he returned to TV Globo to appear in Alcides Nogueira's soap opera De Quina pra Lua. In 1987, he returned to Manchete to work on the soap opera Helena. While at the station, she participated in the soap operas Kananga do Japão and Pantanal.

Back at Globo, he worked on the soap opera Pedra sobre Pedra and the miniseries Labirinto. He was also in the cast of História de Amor and Páginas da Vida, both written by Manoel Carlos. His last TV role was in the fifteenth season of the teen series Malhação, broadcast by Globo in 2008.

Together with Luiz Carlos Lacerda, he directed and wrote the screenplay for the film For All - O Trampolim da Vitória from 1997.

== Personal life ==
He had five children. He was a Botafogo soccer fan.

=== Death ===
After suffering cardiac arrest in the early hours of April 3, 2010, he was taken to Samaritano Hospital in the Botafogo neighborhood, where he died. The actor suffered from leukemia, but the disease did not contribute to his death. His body was buried in the São João Batista cemetery in Rio.

== Filmography ==
=== TV ===
Year	Title	Character	Notes	Broadcaster
1972	Selva de Pedra	Júnior		TV Globo
1972	Caso Especial	Jewish fiancé	Episode: "Dibuk, o demônio"	TV Globo
1974	O Rebu	Cauê		TV Globo
1980	Caso Especial	Tide	Episode: "Romeu e Julieta"	TV Globo
1980	Carga Pesada		Episode: "Bode expiatório"	TV Globo
1981	O Amor É Nosso	Bruno		TV Globo
1981	Brilhante	Cláudio		TV Globo
1982	Quem Ama Não Mata	Lucas		TV Globo
1982	Final Feliz	Paulo		TV Globo
1984	Santa Marta Fabril S.A.			Rede Manchete
1984	Marquesa de Santos	Terêncio		Rede Manchete
1985	De Quina pra Lua			TV Globo
1987	Helena	Tertuliano		Rede Manchete
1988	Abolição	Antônio da Silva Jardim		TV Globo
1988	República	Antônio da Silva Jardim		TV Globo
1989	Kananga do Japão	Dudu		Rede Manchete
1990	Pantanal	Grego	Special appearance	Rede Manchete
1991	Meu Marido	Garcia		TV Globo
1992	Pedra sobre Pedra	Benvido Soares	First phase	TV Globo
1992	Despedida de Solteiro	Yan		TV Globo
1995	Você Decide		Episode: "Agora ou nunca"	TV Globo
1995	Você Decide	Luís Afonso	Episode: "O grande homem"	TV Globo
1995	História de Amor	Marcos		TV Globo
1998	Labirinto	Sílvio Fontes Mello		TV Globo
2006	Páginas da Vida	Ivan Monteiro Telles		TV Globo
2008	Malhação	Marcos		TV Globo

=== Cinema ===
Year	Title	Character	Notes
1984	Patriamada	Goiás	
1987	O País dos Tenentes	Tenente Pena	
1996	Seu Garçon Faça o Favor de Me Trazer Depressa	Man at the bar	Short film
1997	For All - O Trampolim da Vitória		Also director and screenwriter
1998	Vox Populi	Dr. Heitor	
2000	Brave New Land	Antônio	
2004	Viva Sapato!	Agent I	
2006	Vestido de Noiva	Journalist	
2010	Elvis & Madona	Heitor	

=== Theater ===
Year	Play	Author(s)	Director	Theater	Ref.
1969	Hair	Gerome Ragni, James Rado	Ademar Guerra	Teatro Bela Vista, São Paulo	
1972	O refém	Brendan Behan	João das Neves		
1972	Missa Leiga	Chico de Assis	Ademar Guerra	São Paulo	
1972	Bordel da Salvação	Brendan Behan	João das Neves	Teatro Opinião, Rio de Janeiro	
1973	Falemos sem calças	Guilhermo Gentile	Antônio Abujamra	São Paulo	
1975	Simbad, o Marujo	Grupo Pão e Circo	Luís Antônio Martinez Corrêa	Rio de Janeiro	
1975	Pano de Boca	Fauzi Arap	Antônio Pedro	Teatro Glaucio Gill, Rio de Janeiro	
1976	Síndica, Qual é a Tua?	Luiz Carlos Góes	Antônio Pedro	Teatro Ipanema, Rio de Janeiro	
1978	Triste Fim de Policarpo Quaresma	Lima Barreto	Buza Ferraz	Teatro Dulcina, Rio de Janeiro	
1980	A Loja das Maravilhas Naturais	Benjamin Santos	Buza Ferraz	Rio de Janeiro	
1980	Cabaré Valentim	Karl Valentin	Buza Ferraz	Teatro Cândido Mendes, Rio de Janeiro	
1981	Poleiro dos Anjos	Buza Ferraz	Buza Ferraz	Teatro Cândido Mendes, Rio de Janeiro	
1982	Serafim Ponte Grande	Oswald de Andrade	Buza Ferraz	Rio de Janeiro	
1983	Sai da Lama Jacaré	Buza Ferraz	Buza Ferraz	Rio de Janeiro	
1984	O Beijo no Asfalto	Nelson Rodrigues	Buza Ferraz	Rio de Janeiro	
1984	Céu Azul	Gilda Guilhon	Buza Ferraz	Teatro Glaucio Gill, Rio de Janeiro	
