= O Príncipe =

2002 film directed by Ugo Giorgetti

- Theatrical release poster
- Directed by: Ugo Giorgetti
- Screenplay by: Ugo Giorgetti
- Produced by: Malu Oliveira
- Starring: Eduardo Tornaghi; Bruna Lombardi; Ricardo Blat; Ewerton de Castro; Otávio Augusto
- Cinematography: Pedro Paulo Lazzarini
- Edited by: Marc De Rossi
- Music by: Mauro Giorgetti
- Production company: SP Filmes de São Paulo
- Distributed by: Mais Filmes
- Release date: 9 August 2002
- Running time: 102 minutes
- Country: Brazil
- Language: Portuguese
- Box office: R$ 94,037

O Príncipe (lit. "The Prince") is a 2002 Brazilian drama film directed and written by Ugo Giorgetti and starring Eduardo Tornaghi, Bruna Lombardi, Ricardo Blat, Ewerton de Castro and Otávio Augusto.

== Plot ==
Gustavo (Eduardo Tornaghi), a middle-aged intellectual man, lives in Paris for more than 20 years, after leaving Brazil because of the coup d'état. After many years, he returns to São Paulo, due to the illness of his mother, in an opportunity to discover a country that he does not recognize anymore.

== Cast ==
- Eduardo Tornaghi as Gustavo
- Bruna Lombardi as Maria Cristina
- Ricardo Blat as Mário
- Ewerton de Castro as Marino Esteves
- Otávio Augusto as Renato
- Elias Andreato as Aron
- Márcia Bernardes as Hilda
- Bruno Giordano as School principal
- Luis Guilherme as Rudolf
- Lígia Cortez as Miriam
- Henrique Lisboa as Amaro
- Júlio Medaglia as Conductor
