= Barriga de Aluguel =

Brazilian telenovela by Glória Perez

- Genre: Telenovela
- Created by: Glória Perez
- Directed by: Wolf Maya
- Starring: Cláudia Abreu; Cássia Kis; Victor Fasano; Humberto Martins; Mário Lago; Beatriz Segall; Renée de Vielmond; Adriano Reys
- Opening theme: Aguenta Coração by José Augusto
- Country of origin: Brazil
- Original language: Portuguese
- No. of episodes: 243

Production
- Production location: Brazil
- Running time: 50 minutes

Original release
- Network: Rede Globo
- Release: 20 August 1990 – 31 May 1991

Related
- Gente Fina; Salomé

Barriga de Aluguel (English: Belly Rent) is a Brazilian telenovela produced and broadcast by Rede Globo between 20 August 1990 and 31 May 1991 in 243 episodes. It was created by Glória Perez in collaboration with Leila Míccolis and directed by Wolf Maya.

== Cast ==
Actor / Actress	Character(s)
Cláudia Abreu	Clara Ribeiro
Cássia Kis	Ana Lúcia Paranhos de Alencar
Victor Fasano	José Carlos de Alencar (Zeca)
Mário Lago	Dr. Molina
Beatriz Segall	Miss Penelope Brown
Lady Francisco	Yara
Adriano Reys	Dr. Álvaro Baronni
Renée de Vielmond	Aída Baronni
Jairo Mattos	Tadeu Junqueira Lima
Nicole Puzzi	Luísa Coller
Humberto Martins	João dos Santos
Denise Fraga	Rita Garcez
Leonardo Villar	Ezequiel Ribeiro
Vera Holtz	Dos Anjos
Lúcia Alves	Moema Paranhos
Wolf Maya	Paulo César
Sura Berditchevsky	Raquel Ribeiro
Eri Johnson	Lulu
Tereza Seiblitz	Laura Maria Baronni
Emiliano Queiroz	Dr. Barroso
Sônia Guedes	Ambrosina dos Santos
Francisco Milani	Chiquinho/Ramon/Dartagnan/Salgado
Anilza Leoni	Edith
Carlos Kroeber	Ramiro de Alencar
Ilka Soares	Mimi de Alencar
Paulo César Grande	Dudu
Carla Daniel	Cissa
Tácito Rocha	Garcez
Regina Restelli	Rosa Aimeé
Marcelo Saback	Duarte
Daniela Perez	Clô
Ricardo Câmara	Serginho
Mariane Ebert	Drica
Chico Tenreiro	Antônio
Darcy de Souza	Leonora
Jonas Mello	Delegado José de Oliveira
Mary Daniel	Vovó Lola
Rosimar de Mello	Teresinha
Paulo Leite	Fernando
Paula Burlamaqui	Paulinha
Pedro Bellini	Jeremias
Vânia de Brito	Dina
Duda Ribeiro	Ricky
Vanessa Barum	Leninha
Renato Rabello	Pitty Paranhos
Cynthia Maranhão	Mariana Paranhos
Caio Junqueira	Tatau Paranhos
Alessandra Aguiar	Tita

=== Supporting cast ===
Actor / Actress	Character
Tetê Vasconcellos	Cacá
Cacá Silva	Tomas
Kristhel Byancco	Daisy
Dayse Tenório	Regina
Leonardo Serrano	Marcelinho
Neuza Amaral	Juíza
Antonio Viana	Bené
Victor Branco	Jonas
Nelson Dantas	analyst
Ivan Mesquita	tipstaff
Júlia Miranda	Audenora
Moacyr Deriquém	Juiz
Paulo Villaça	judge
Vera Paxie	Maria Alice
Ivon Cury	Promotor
Newton Martins	Delegado
Bruno Gagliasso	Dr. Barroso's son
Beatriz Lyra	Social worker

== International releases ==
Barriga de Aluguel was aired in over 30 countries, among them:

- Argentina
- Belgium
- Canada
- Chile
- Colombia
- Germany
- Greece
- Italy
- Japan
- Mozambique
- Netherlands
- Peru
- Russia
- Sweden
- Turkey
- United States
- Venezuela
