= Haroldo Costa =

Brazilian actor, writer and producer (1930–2025)

Haroldo Costa (May 13, 1930 – December 13, 2025) was a Brazilian actor, writer, producer and samba musician.

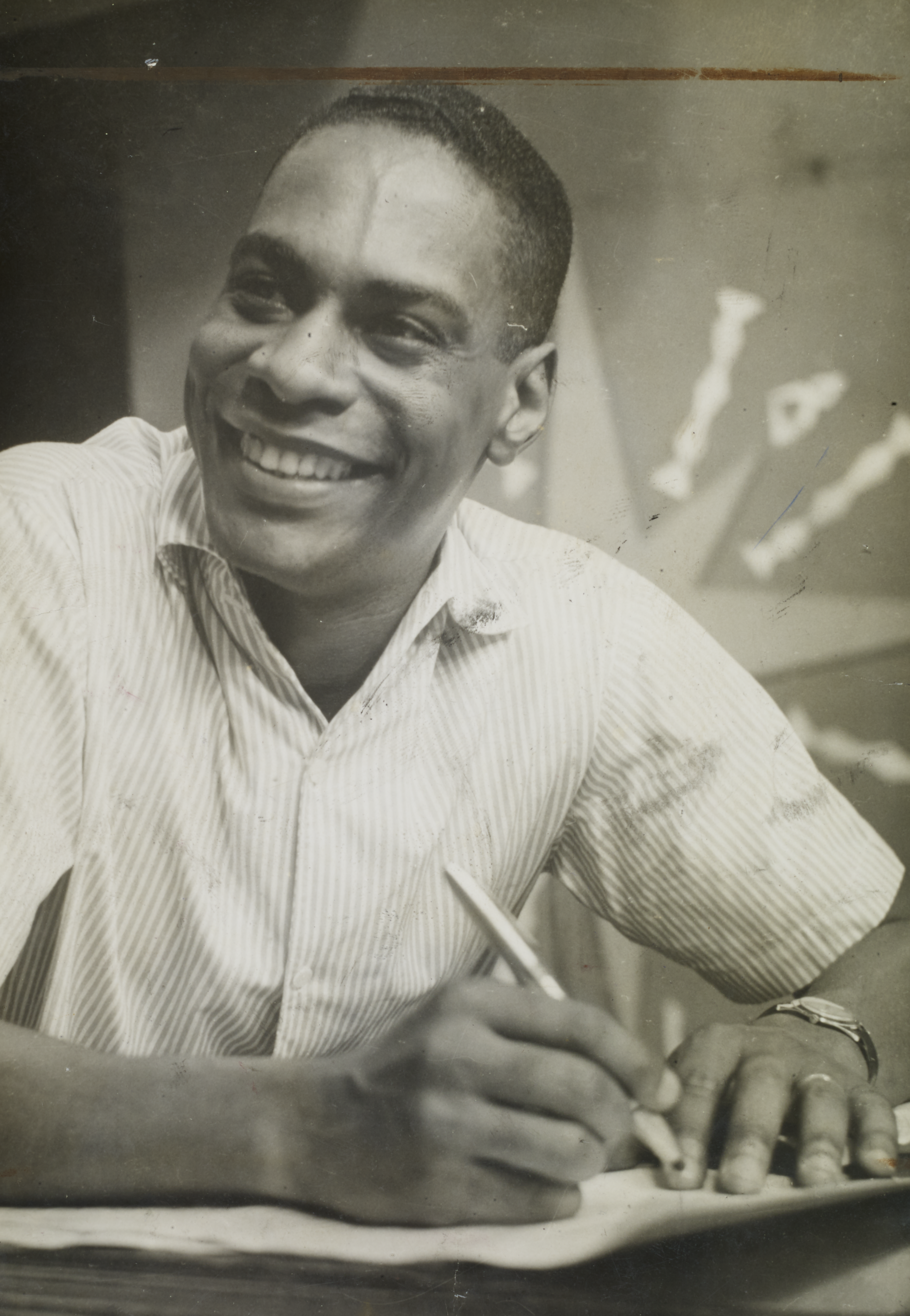
Haroldo Costa in 1964

== Life and career ==
Costa was born in Rio de Janeiro on May 13, 1930. He made his television debut in 1958 in an episode of Grande Teatro Tupi, however he would become known for his roles in telenovelas including A Moreninha (1965), Kananga do Japão, (1989) and Você Decide.

In 2005, he participated as leading historian in the documentary film Samba on your Feet by Eduardo Montes-Bradley.

In 2015, documentary filmmaker Silvio Tendler directed a documentary on Costa, titled "Haroldo Costa – Our Orpheus".

In 2021, he wrote the graphic novel The History of Samba Told in Comics, illustrated by Ykenga.

Costa died on December 13, 2025, at the age of 95.
