= For All - O Trampolim da Vitória =

1997 film directed by Buza Ferraz

- Directed by: Buza Ferraz; Luiz Carlos Lacerda
- Written by: Buza Ferraz; Luiz Carlos Lacerda; Joaquim Assis
- Starring: Betty Faria; José Wilker; Paulo Gorgulho; Louise Cardoso; Diogo Vilela
- Release date: 1997
- Running time: 95 minutes
- Country: Brazil
- Language: Portuguese

For All - O Trampolim da Vitória (English: For All: Springboard to Victory) is a 1997 Brazilian comedy-drama film directed by Buza Ferraz and Luiz Carlos Lacerda.

Largely praised by critics, he received the awards for best film, best script, best soundtrack, best art direction and best jury film at the 25th Gramado Film Festival, and best film, best actor and best art direction at the Brazilian Film Festival of Miami. It was also the last credited role of actor Alexandre Lippiani, who died in a traffic collision on May 24, 1997.

== Cast ==
- Betty Faria... Lindalva Sandrini
- José Wilker ... Giancarlo Sandrini
- Paulo Gorgulho... João Marreco
- Caio Junqueira... Miguel Sandrini
- Erik Svane... Sargento Frank Donovan
- Alexandre Lippiani.... Capitão
- Luiz Carlos Tourinho....Sandoval
- Flávia Bonato....Iracema
- Daniela Duarte.... Jucilene
- Alexandre Barros... Tenente Robert Collins
- Claudia Netto.... Jay Francis
- Cláudio Mamberti.... Sr. Bola
- Edson Celulari... Wolfgang Stössel
- Marcélia Cartaxo.... Miloca
- Claudia Mauro.... Bernadete
- Catarina Abdala... Clotilde
