= Leila Míccolis =

Brazilian writer and poet

Leila Míccolis (born 1947) is a Brazilian poet, essayist, novelist, short story writer, screenwriter, playwright, and editor.

== Life ==
Leila Míccolis was born in 1947 in Rio de Janeiro's Tijuca neighborhood. She was an only child. Míccolis graduated with a law degree in 1969 from the old Federal University of Rio de Janeiro Faculty of Law. She later received a master's in literature and literary theory from the Federal University in 2007, as well as a doctorate in literary theory.

Míccolis worked as a lawyer until 1977, when she decided to dedicate herself exclusively to literature. She published her first book of poems, Gaveta da Solidão, in 1965. Her poetry has been collected in Desfamiliares: poesía completa de Leila Míccolis, covering the years 1965 to 2012, and Em poetisa todo mundo pisa, covering 2013 to 2022. In 1983 she began to write TV scripts, becoming the co-author of such telenovelas as Kananga do Japão (1989) with Wilson Aguiar Filho and Barriga de Aluguel (1990) with Glória Perez.

In 1991 she founded with her fellow poet Urhacy Faustino the literary magazine Blocos, and they created the digital version Blocos Online eight years later. She has written and edited over 30 books of poetry and prose, as well as many TV, theater, and film scripts. She also taught telenovela writing courses at the Federal University beginning in 2005.

While Míccolis has publicly rejected labels on sexuality, saying "I wanted to question the division of women into lesbians and non-lesbians," her work has included poetry on lesbian themes. Her poem "Teus Seios" was featured in the Grupo Gay da Bahia's first Gay Poetry of Brazil Contest in 1982. She was a vocal activist with the gay rights organization Grupo Auê in Rio in the 1970s and '80s, coordinating a precursor to the Encontro Brasileiro de Homossexuais (Brazilian Gathering of Homosexuals) in that city. Her poetry also deals with feminist themes and the rejection of traditional social roles and structures: "I am always revolted with the game of appearances and with the hypocrisy of the family relationship or the relationship of two people. And my poetry questions those imposed social roles that are manipulative and responsible for the internalization of submission, of castration, of guilt, and of low female esteem."

Her role as an activist and the Brazilian "patron saint of hippy pack rats," as the Miami Herald once described her, included amassing a library of alternative newspapers, magazines, mimeographs, and posters from the era of Brazil's military dictatorship. She eventually sold the collection to the University of Miami, where it is available for researchers as the Leila Míccolis Brazilian Alternative Press Collection.

Míccolis lived in Maricá for many years with Faustino and the writer Mônica Banderas and now lives in Cândido Mota, where she continues to produce work and teach virtual writing workshops.

== Selected works ==
=== Poetry and prose ===
- Gaveta da solidão (1965)
- Jacarés e lobisomens: dois ensaios sobre a homossexualidade, with Herbert Daniel (1983)
- Do poder ao poder (1987)
- Desfamiliares: poesía completa de Leila Míccolis, 1965-2012
- "Literatura e palco" (2011)
- "A leveza de uma amizade sólida" (2017)
- Em poetisa todo mundo pisa (2023)

=== Television ===
- Mania de Querer
- A Rainha da Vida
- Olho por Olho
- Kananga do Japão
- Barriga de Aluguel
- Mandacaru
