= Anilza Leoni =

Brazilian actress and artist (1933–2009)

- Born: Anilza Pinho de Carvalho; October 10, 1933; Laguna, Santa Catarina
- Died: August 6, 2009 (aged 75); Rio de Janeiro
- Occupations: Actress, singer, dancer, painter

Anilza Pinho de Carvalho, better known by her stage name Anilza Leoni, (October 10, 1933 – August 6, 2009) was a Brazilian actress, singer, former ballerina and painter.

Leoni was born in Laguna, Santa Catarina, Brazil, on October 10, 1933. She died of emphysema in Rio de Janeiro on August 6, 2009, at the age of 75.

== Filmography ==
=== Television ===
- 2008 – Casos e Acasos (series on Rede Globo) ... Berta
- 2008 – Queridos Amigos (miniseries on Rede Globo) ... Neusa
- 2007 – Pé na Jaca! (Globo)... Dalva
- 2002 – Brava Gente ... Marta
- 2002 – Desejos de Mulher (Globo) ... Customer of Selma
- 1990 – Barriga de Aluguel (Globo) ... Edith
- 1986 – Selva de Pedra (Globo)
- 1985 – A Gata Comeu (Globo) ... Ester Penteado
- 1984 – A Máfia no Brasil
- 1965 – Quatro Homens Juntos (Record) ... Marlene
