= Ricardo Blat =

Brazilian actor

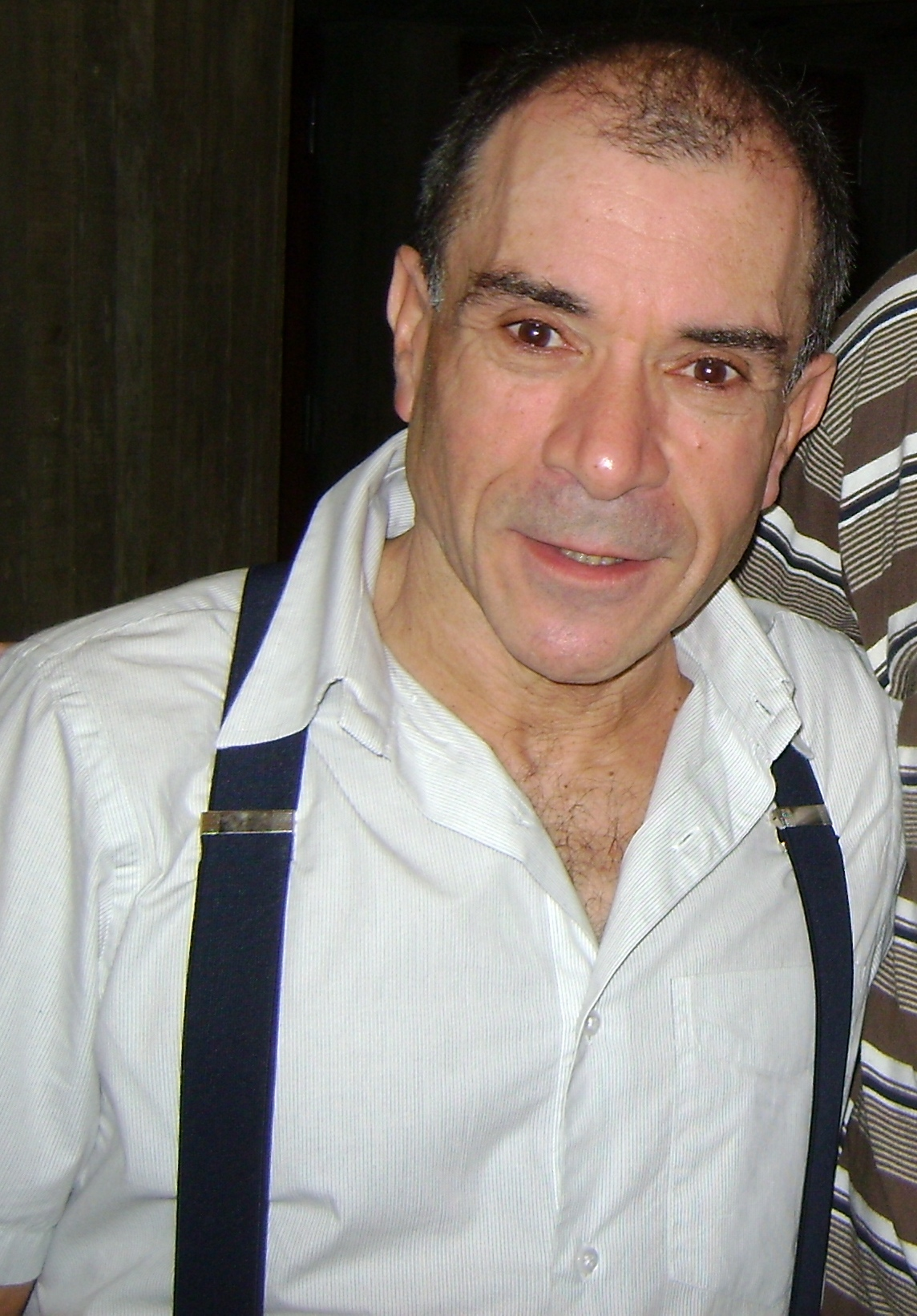
- Born: Ricardo Barbosa Blat; 16 November 1950 (age 75); Ferraz de Vasconcelos, São Paulo, Brazil
- Occupation: Actor
- Years active: 1974–present
- Relatives: Caio Blat (cousin)

Ricardo Barbosa Blat (born 16 November 1950) is a Brazilian actor.

== Biography ==
Blat was born on 16 November 1950 in Ferraz de Vasconcelos. He began his theatre in career at the Teatro Experimental Mogiano (TEM) in the 1960s. This includes a 1971 performance of Peer Gynt, in which he performed with Stênio Garcia, Jonas Bloch, Ariclê Perez, Ewerton de Castro, and Roberto Frota. He continued to perform in various works of theatres in the 1980s and 1990s, becoming known for his role in Uma Estória de Borboletas in 1983. He has won various awards in theatre as well as in other fields, including the Prêmio Shell and the Prêmio Manhembe e Coca-Cola, the latter for his roles in children's theatre shows. He is currently nominated for an award from the Platino Awards for best supporting actor in a series for his role as Ernesto in Cangaço Novo.

His brother is author Rogério Blat, and his cousin is actor Caio Blat.

== Filmography ==
=== Television ===
Year	Title	Role	Notes
2023	Cangaço Novo	Ernesto	
2021	Gênesis	Lotam	Arc: "Jornada de Abraão"
2018	Deus Salve o Rei	Issandro	
2017	Os Dias Eram Assim	Sandoval Freitas	
2016	Magnífica 70	Padre Ribeiro	
2015	I Love Paraisópolis	Adônia Paiva (Sabão)	
2014	Meu Pedacinho de Chão	Manoel das Antas (Prefeito das Antas)	
2013	Uma Rua Sem Vergonha	Marconi di Paula	
2012	Guerra dos Sexos	Moysés de Assis	
2011	Fina Estampa	Severino de Jesus	
2010	Tempos Modernos	Fidélio de Sá	
2009	Por Toda Minha Vida	Ezequiel Neves	Episode: "Cazuza"
2009	Uma Noite no Castelo	Matíades Lancelotti	Year end special
2008	Casos e Acasos	Felipe Oliveire	Episode: "O Encontro Inesperado, o Homem e a Estreia Confusa"
2007	Duas Caras	Inácio Lisboa (Pastor Inácio)	
2006	Sítio do Picapau Amarelo	Gaspar Motta	
2006	JK	Tales da Rocha Vianna	
2005	Hoje É Dia de Maria	Asmodeu Sátiro	
2005	Hoje É Dia de Maria: Segunda Jornada	Asmodeu Piteira (Gato)	
1998	Hilda Furacão	Cido Gasparani (Cidinho)	
1998	Caça Talentos	Calixto	Episode: "Contos de Arrepio"
1996	Caça Talentos	Faísca	Episodes: "História Piloto"; "Natal"; "Bruxa Bela"
1996	O Fim do Mundo	Emiliano Ferreira	
1995	Decadência	Artêmio de Sousa Bastos	
1994	Você Decide	Lauro	Episode: "Educação Sentimental"
1993	Mulheres de Areia	Paulo Salles (Marujo)	
1991	Amazônia	Celestino de Jesus Flores	
1991	O Portador	Maurício Alencar	
1990	Fronteiras do Desconhecido	Camilo Barbosa	Episode: "O Acidente"
1989	Pacto de Sangue	Pedro Camargo Xavier	
1984	Corpo a Corpo	Nuno Mendes de Castro	
1983	Maçã do Amor	Maurício	
1983	Sombras do Passado	Toni	
1982	Destino	João Luís Moraes (Luisinho)	
1982	Os Imigrantes	Edgar Ataliba	
1980	Água Viva	Jofre do Lins Rêgo	
1979	Marron Glacê	Juliano Muniz Prado	
1979	Memórias de Amor	Egbert Pinheiro Pereira	
1978	Te Contei?	Túlio Sequeira (Tuta)	
1977	Sem Lenço, sem Documento	José Luís dos Santos (Zé Luís)	
1976	Estúpido Cupido	João Arantes Guimarães	
1975	A Viagem	Hélio Tavares	

=== Film ===
- 2016 - O Casamento de Gorete - Pai de Gorete
- 2008 - Last Stop 174 - Pedreiro / grizzled passenger
- 2005 - Vinicius - Leitor de poema
- 2005 - Achados e Perdidos - Nicanor
- 2004 - Capital Circulante
- 2003 - Carandiru - Claudiomiro
- 2002 - O Príncipe - Mário
- 2002 - Madame Satã - José
- 1999 - Xuxa Requebra - Chefe de Redação
- 1996 - Sem Canhão Não Se Fala aos Céus
- 1987 - Anjos do Arrabalde - Afonso
- 1987 - Tanga
- 1980 - Os Paspalhões em Pinóquio 2000
- 1974 - O Trote dos Sádicos - Valente

== Awards and nominations ==
Year	Award	Category	Category	Result
2024	Platino Awards	Best Supporting Actor in a Series	Cangaço Novo	Pending
