= Cristiana Oliveira =

Brazilian actress

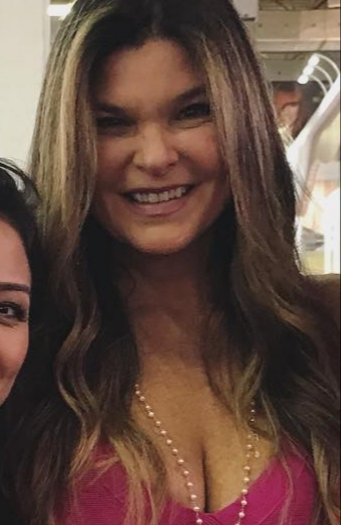
- Cristiana Oliveira during a fashion event in March 2018.
- Born: Cristiana Barbosa da Silva de Oliveira; December 15, 1963 (age 62); Rio de Janeiro, Brazil
- Occupations: Actress; model; businesswoman
- Spouses: André Wanderley (m. 1982; div. 1990) Marcos Sampaio (m. 1994; div. 2002)
- Children: 2
- Parent(s): Oscar de Oliveira (father); Eugênia Barbosa da Silva de Oliveira (mother)

Cristiana Barbosa da Silva de Oliveira (born December 15, 1963, in Rio de Janeiro) is a Brazilian actress, model and businesswoman.

== Biography ==
The daughter of Oscar de Oliveira and Eugênia Barbosa da Silva de Oliveira, Cristiana Oliveira is the youngest of a family of nine children with two brothers and seven sisters. Oliveira was born and raised in a house in Ipanema, Brazil. To help at home she began to work at a flower shop near her residence at ten years of age. Her nickname, since she was a young child, was Krika.

== Career ==
After recording a commercial directed by Walter Salles, she was called by Jayme Monjardim, to audition for TV Manchete for Shock a program broadcasting music clips. She auditioned for the leading role of Dora for the telenovela Kananga do Japão. She was cast as Hannah after actress Bia Seidl quit the role. Associação Paulista de Críticos de Arte (APCA) recognized Oliveira's performance in that show.

In 1989, she began recording the Pantanal for Rede Manchete. After reading the synopsis, Oliveira fell in love with the character of Juma, a role initially intended for actress Glória Pires, and offered to play her. The telenovela was a big hit, winning a large audience for Rede Manchete and becoming a landmark in Brazilian soap operas. Her work won awards in Brazil and abroad. It was one of her most recognized and idolized roles.

In 1992, she was hired by TV Globo as the protagonist for the miniseries Agosto, a role that ultimately came to be played by Vera Fischer. Instead, Oliviera won the part of the protagonist, along with Tarcísio Meira, for the telenovela De Corpo e Alma. In February of that year, she posed nude for the Brazilian edition of Playboy magazine.

In 1994, she took part in the miniseries Memorial de Maria Moura, and then starred in the soap opera Quatro por Quatro, alongside actresses Letícia Spiller, Elizabeth Savalla and Betty Lago. It was her first comic role as a television actress. After the end of the telenovela, she lived in New York City in order to improve her English.

In 2001, she appeared in the first episode of the soap opera Porto dos Milagres. The following year she was in the second season of the telenovela O Clone, in which she was disguised as the villain Alicinha.

In 2011, she had a cameo role as lesbian and convicted drug dealer named Araci Laranjeira in Insensato Coração. Her performance was praised by viewers and critics alike. She had to gain 15 pounds to play the role and was a victim of prejudice from some of the media and the public. In 2012, she played Yolanda in Salve Jorge. In 2014, she returns to TV in the GNT series, Animal, in the role of former delegate and mayor Mariana Gomes. In 2015, it signs contract with Rede Record to integrate the cast of the novel A Terra Prometida.

In 2018, Cristiana returns to the cinema after eleven years since the last film in which she participated, Nossa Senhora de Caravaggio. She is in the cast of Eu sou Brasileiro, by Alessandro Barros; Borderline, by Cibele Amaral; Paixão Nacional, by Teresa Jessouron, and in Uma Carta para Ferdinand, by Anderson and Kleber Dresch.

In 2019, after three years away from television, she will return to soap operas on Topíssima, RecordTV's telenovela, playing Lara, a social climber.

== Personal life ==
At age 13, in 1976, she became addicted to cigarettes, only succeeding in getting rid of dependency in 1998, with the help of Victor Fasano, her friend by profession.

Cristiana was married to photographer André Wanderley, from this union was born Rafaella. In 1994, Cristiana married for the second time, this time with the businessman Marcos Sampaio, with whom she was married for 8 years. In 1999, her second daughter, Antônia, was born.

On February 7, 2013, became grandmother for the first time, with the birth of Miguel, son of Rafaella.

== Filmography ==
=== Television ===
Year	Title	Role	Notes
1989	Kananga do Japão	Hannah	
1990	Pantanal	Juma Marruá	
1991	Fronteiras do Desconhecido	Billie Frechette	Episode: "Inimigos Públicos"
1991	Amazônia	Camille / Milla	
1992	Amazônia - Parte II	Camille	
1992	De Corpo e Alma	Paloma Bianchi	
1994	Memorial de Maria Moura	Marialva	
1994	Quatro por Quatro	Tatiana Tarantino (Maria das Dores Santanna / Raio de Sol)	
1996	Salsa e Merengue	Adriana Campos Queiroz	
1998	Corpo Dourado	Selena Pereira	
1999	Vila Madalena	Pilar Ramirez	
2001	Porto dos Milagres	Eulália	First phase
2001	O Clone	Alicinha	
2002	O Olhar da Serpente	Celeste Carvalho Pinto	In Portugal on the SIC channel
2003	Kubanacan	Helena	Episodes: "May 7–8, 2003"
2005	Malhação	Rita Garcia	Season 12
2006	A Diarista	Betty	Episode: "Até Que a Nete os Separe"
2007	Amazônia, de Galvez a Chico Mendes	Carminha	Third phase
2007	Dança dos Famosos 4	Participant	Domingão do Faustão's reality show
2007	Sete Pecados	Dra. Margareth	
2008	Casos e Acasos	Simone	Episode: "O Colar, O Cachorro e O DVD"
2008	Faça Sua História	Talita	Episode: "Álbum de Família"
2008	Casos e Acasos	Bárbara	Episode: "O Parto, o Batom e o Passaporte"
2009	Paraíso	Zuleika Tavares	
2011	Insensato Coração	Araci Laranjeira	Episodes: "March 19–April 25, 2011"
2012	Salve Jorge	Yolanda Pereira Gomes	
2014	Animal	Mariana Gomes	
2015	Os Homens São de Marte...	Laura	Episode: "A Outra"
2016	A Terra Prometida	Mara	
2017	Tô de Graça	Drª Verônica	Episode: "Mudança de Sexo"
2019	Topíssima	Lara Lopes Valença	
2022	Pacto Brutal - O Assassinato de Daniella Perez	Herself	Documentary
2022	Pantanal	Wedding guest	Guest star
2026	Então é Amor?!	Marta Valmori	Globoplay

=== Film ===
Year	Title	Role
1991	Os Trapalhões e a Árvore da Juventude	Juliana
2006	Gatão de Meia Idade	Sandrão
2007	Nossa Senhora de Caravaggio	Angélica
2018	Borderline	
2018	Paixão Nacional	
2019	Eu Sou Brasileiro	Carmem
2020	Uma Carta para Ferdinand	Mella
2021	Por que Você Não Chora?	Do Carmo
2022	Os Suburbanos: O Filme	Lorena
