= Anjo Mau (1976 TV series) =

- Genre: Telenovela
- Created by: Cassiano Gabus Mendes
- Directed by: Fábio Sabag; Régis Cardoso; Reynaldo Boury
- Starring: Susana Vieira; José Wilker; Vera Gimenez; Luis Gustavo; Renée de Vielmond; Pepita Rodrigues
- Opening theme: "Papaya" - Urszula Dudziak
- Country of origin: Brazil
- Original language: Portuguese
- No. of episodes: 175

Production
- Running time: 45 minutes

Original release
- Network: TV Globo
- Release: 2 February – 24 August 1976

Anjo Mau is a Brazilian telenovela produced and broadcast by TV Globo. It premiered on 2 February 1976 and ended on 24 August 1976, with a total of 175 episodes. It's the seventeenth "novela das sete" to be aired at the timeslot. It is created by Cassiano Gabus Mendes, directed by Fábio Sabag with Régis Cardoso.

== Cast ==
Actor	Character
Susana Vieira	Nice Noronha
José Wilker	Rodrigo Medeiros
Vera Gimenez	Paula Moura
Luis Gustavo	Ricardo Medeiros
Renée de Vielmond	Léa
Pepita Rodrigues	Stela Medeiros
Osmar Prado	Getúlio
Wanda Lacerda	Alzira
José Lewgoy	Augusto
Hemílcio Fróes	Edmundo Medeiros
Gilda Sarmento	Carmem
Mário Gomes	Luiz Carlos
Jaime Barcellos	Rui Moura
Rosita Thomaz Lopes	Odete Moura
Átila Iório	Onias
Ilka Soares	Maria Lúcia (Marilu)
Sérgio Britto	Teófilo (Téo)
Henriqueta Brieba	Carolina Medeiros (Vovó Carolina)
Kátia D'Angelo	Antônia (Toninha)
Reinaldo Gonzaga	Fernando
Neila Tavares	Teresa
Zanoni Ferrite	Júlio
Hortênsia Tayer	Lígia Antunes
Ivan Setta	Bodoque
Lídia Vani	Manoela
Selma Lopes	Ruth
Fausto Rocha	José (Zelão)
Heloísa Raso	Viviane (Vivi)
Clarisse Abujamra	Flávia Antunes
