= Otávio Augusto =

Brazilian actor

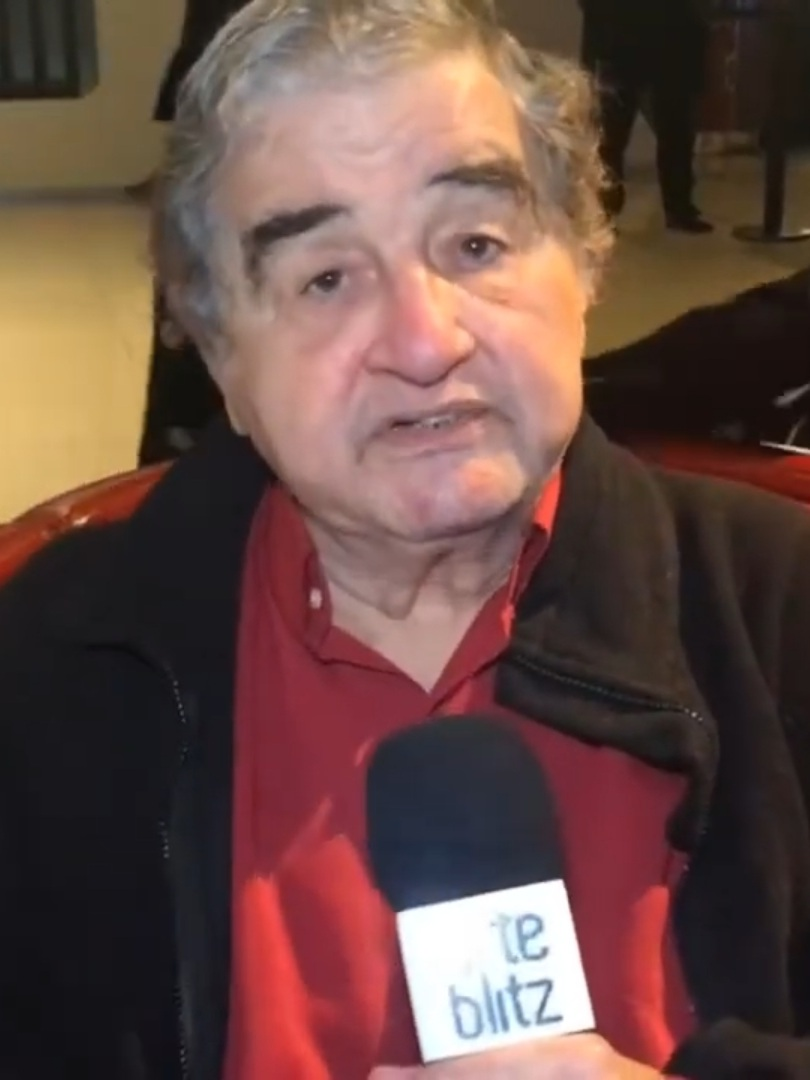
- Otávio Augusto in 2023.
- Born: January 30, 1945 (age 80); São Manuel, São Paulo, Brazil
- Occupation: Actor

Otávio Augusto de Azevedo Sousa (born January 30, 1945) is a Brazilian actor.

== Selected filmography ==
- Selva de Pedra (1986, TV Series)
- Tieta (1989, TV Series)
- Vamp (1991, TV Series)
- The Interview (1995)
- A Próxima Vítima (1995, TV Series) - Ulisses Carvalho
- Ed Mort (1997)
- Central Station (1998)
- A Padroeira (2001)
- Esperança (2002, TV Series)
- O Príncipe (2002)
- Kubanacan (2003)
- Cabocla (2004)
- Cobras & Lagartos (2006)
- Paraíso Tropical (2007)
- Duas Caras (2007)
- Araguaia (2010, TV Series)
- Avenida Brasil (2012, TV Series)
- Alto Astral (2014)
- A Lei do Amor (2016)
- Salve-se Quem Puder (2020)
- Vai na Fé (2023)
