= Guilherme Briggs =

Brazilian voice actor (born 1970)

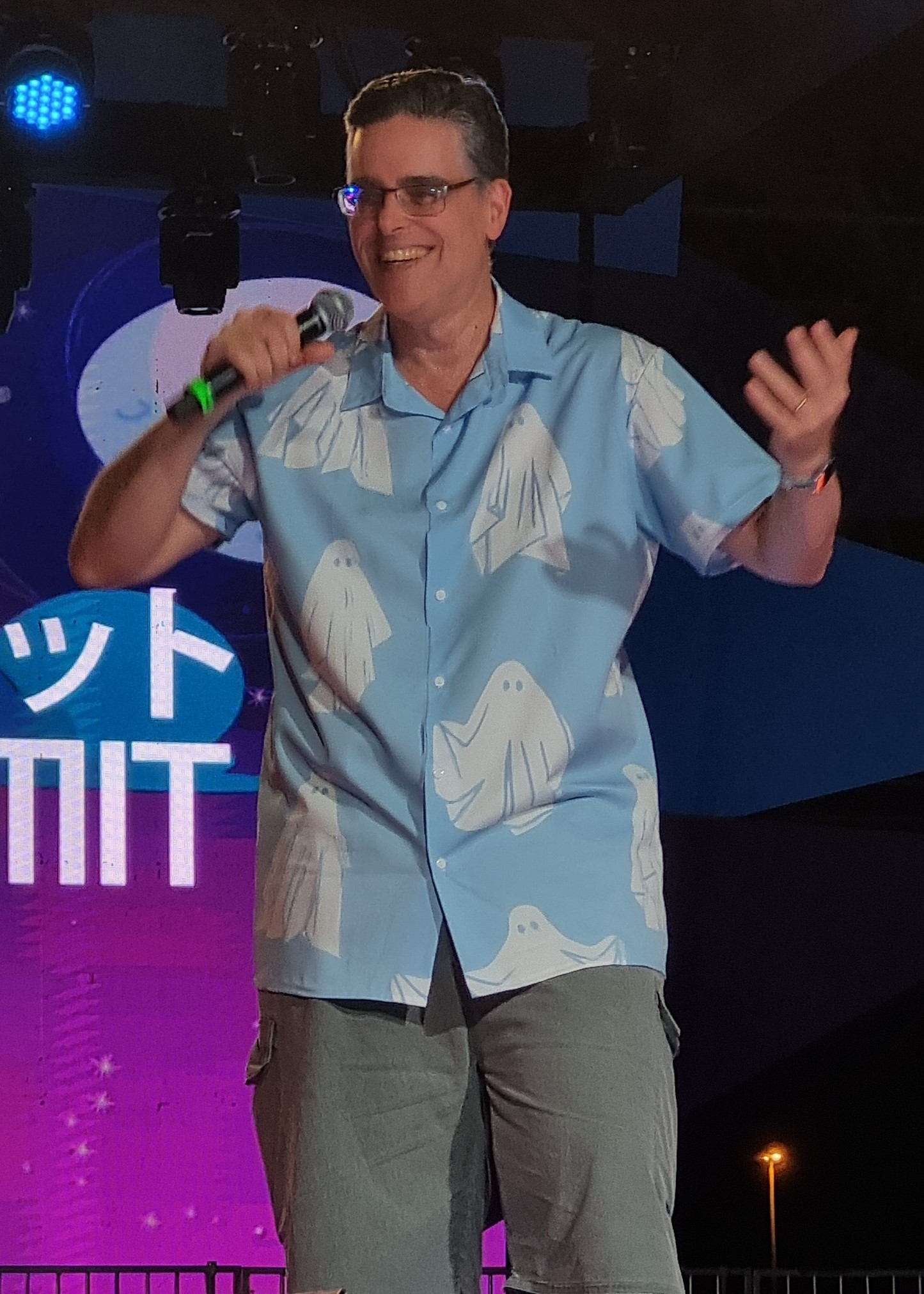
- Guilherme Briggs at Anime Summit 2024
- Born: Guilherme Neves Briggs; 25 July 1970 (age 56); Rio de Janeiro, Brazil
- Occupations: voice actor; dubbing director; announcer; translator; [illustrator; YouTuber
- Years active: 1991–present
- Notable work: Brazilian Portuguese voice of: Samurai Jack; Mickey Mouse; Superman; Optimus Prime; Cosmo; Buzz Lightyear; Freakazoid; King Julien
- Spouse: Fran Briggs
- Parents: Henrique Briggs (father); Suelly Neves (mother)
- Awards: Crunchyroll Anime Awards (2024); Prêmio Dublagem Carioca (2012); Prêmio Top Blog (2011 e 2009); Prêmio Yamato (2010 e 2003)

Guilherme Neves Briggs (born 25 July 1970) is a Brazilian voice actor, dubbing director, announcer, translator, illustrator, and YouTuber. He began working as a voice actor at VTI Rio in 1991 after visiting the studio with a friend. In 1993, Orlando Drummond introduced him to the Herbert Richers studio. Briggs is widely regarded as one of Brazil's leading voice actors.

Some of his most notable work in Brazilian Portuguese dubbing includes the title character in Freakazoid!, the toy Buzz Lightyear in the Toy Story series, Cosmo in The Fairly OddParents, King Julien in the Madagascar series, as well as iconic characters such as Superman and Mickey Mouse (from 2009 onwards).

== Career ==
=== Dubbing directions ===
List of productions with Brazilian Portuguese dubbing directed by Briggs
Production	Studio	Ref.
Avatar	Delart	
Watchmen	Delart	
Mad	Delart	
Despicable Me	Delart	
Aqua Teen: Hunger Force		
