= Simplemente María (1970 TV series) =

1972 Venezuelan telenovela

Simplemente María is a Venezuela telenovela produced by Venezolana de Televisión in 1970. Written by Benedito Ruy Barbosa, it was based on a story by the Argentine writer Celia Alcántara. The series stars Carmen Julia Álvarez, Eduardo Serrano and José Luis Rodríguez.

== Cast ==
- Carmen Julia Álvarez as María
- Eduardo Serrano
- José Luis Rodríguez
- Liliana Durán
- Alberto Álvarez as El hombre de goma
- Yolanda Muñoz
