= Pantanal (1990 TV series) =

Brazilian telenovela

- Main title card
- Genre: Telenovela
- Created by: Benedito Ruy Barbosa
- Written by: Benedito Ruy Barbosa
- Directed by: Jayme Monjardim; Carlos Magalhães; Marcelo de Barreto; Roberto Naar
- Starring: Cláudio Marzo; Cristiana Oliveira; Marcos Winter; Jussara Freire; Marcos Palmeira; Paulo Gorgulho; Nathália Timberg; Rômulo Arantes; Cássia Kiss
- Theme music composer: Marcus Viana
- Opening theme: "Pantanal" by Sagrado Coração da Terra
- Country of origin: Brazil
- No. of episodes: 216

Production
- Executive producer: Alexandre Ishikawa

Original release
- Network: Rede Manchete
- Release: March 27 – December 10, 1990

Related
- Pantanal (2022)

Pantanal is a Brazilian telenovela that aired on Rede Manchete from March 27, 1990, to December 10, 1990. The series is written by Benedito Ruy Barbosa and directed by Jayme Monjardim, Carlos Magalhães, Marcelo de Barreto, and Roberto Naar. It is set in the Pantanal region in Mato Grosso do Sul located in midwestern Brazil. The production received logistical support from TV MS, which at the time was an affiliate of the network.

Pantanal is considered an ecological or environmental telenovela; a small sub-category of the genre whose purpose is to dramatize, and raise audience awareness of environmental degradation.

== Plot ==
In the 1940s, Joventino arrives in the Pantanal of Mato Grosso accompanied by his 10-year-old son, José "Zé" Leôncio. Once settled, he becomes one of the main cattle breeders in the region. After Joventino disappeared in the Pantanal while hunting for oxen in the fields, Zé carries on his father's dream and becomes one of the main farmers in the country. On a visit to Rio de Janeiro, Zé falls in love with Madeleine, a spoiled girl whom he marries and has a son named Joventino "Jove", bearing his grandfather's name. The differences between the couple, and Madeleine not adapting to the rural world, leads to her abandoning Zé and taking their son with her. Abandoned by Madeleine, Zé finds affection with Filó, a former prostitute who has a son, Tadeu.

Years later, Jove, now an adult, finally decides to move in with his father. However, the differences again bring problems for Zé and the two find it difficult to understand each other. The differences are aggravated when Jove falls in love with Juma Marruá, a wild and sensual young woman raised as a savage by her mother until her death, killed in revenge in a dispute between land squatters and victims of hoarding. Like her mother, Juma is said in the Pantanal to transform into a jaguar. Feeling rejected by his father, who thinks his son is effeminate, and ridiculed by the peasants for his city boy ways, Jove decides to return to Rio de Janeiro and takes Juma with him. After a time in Rio, where the culture shock is now suffered by Juma, Jove returns to the Pantanal so as not to be separated from his beloved. This time, he is willing to adapt to the local lifestyle. Jove begins to settle down with his father and Juma and gradually becomes a true Pantanaler, surprising everyone little by little.

== Cast ==
=== Main ===
- Cláudio Marzo as José "Zé" Leôncio / Joventino "Velho do Rio"
- Marcos Winter as Joventino "Jove" Leôncio Neto
- Cristiana Oliveira as Juma Marruá
- Marcos Palmeira as Tadeu
- Jussara Freire as Filomena "Filó" Aparecida
  - Tânia Alves as Young Filó
- Paulo Gorgulho as Young José Leôncio / José Lucas de Nada
- Ítala Nandi as Madeleine Braga Novaes
  - Ingra Liberato as Young Madeleine
- José de Abreu as Gustavo
- Elaine Cristina as Irma Braga Novaes
  - Carolina Ferraz as Young Irma
- Nathália Timberg as Mariana Braga Novaes
- Ângela Leal as Maria Bruaca
- Ângelo Antônio as Alcides
- Luciene Adami as Maria Augusta "Guta"
- Tarcísio Filho as Marcelo
- Sérgio Reis as Tibério
- Andréa Richa as Maria Rute "Muda"
- Rosamaria Murtinho as Zuleika
- Antônio Petrin as Tenório
- Flávia Monteiro as Nalvinha
- Ernesto Piccolo as Renato "Reno"
- Eduardo Cardoso as Roberto "Beto"
- Almir Sater as Xeréu Trindade
- Rômulo Arantes as Levy
- Marcos Caruso as Tião
- Ewerton de Castro as Quim
- Giovanna Gold as Zefa
- João Alberto Carvalho as Zaqueu
- Ivan de Almeida as Orlando
- Lana Francis as Teca
- Gláucia Rodrigues as Matilde
- Luiz Henrique Sant'Agostinho as Ari

=== Guest stars ===
- Cássia Kiss as Maria Marruá
- José Dumont as Gil
- Oswaldo Loureiro as Chico
- Sérgio Britto as Antero Novaes
- Sérgio Mamberti as Dr. Arnaud
- Antônio Pitanga as Túlio
- Buza Ferraz as Grego
- Júlio Levy as Davi
- Rubens Corrêa as Congressman Ibrahim Chaguri
- Gisela Reimann as Érica

== Reception ==
Pantanal made history after it became the first telenovela since the closure of Rede Tupi in 1980, to top Brazilian audience ratings. Its success was so elevated that Rede Globo extended the timeslot of the 8 p.m. telenovela Rainha da Sucata and created a telenovela (Araponga) for the 10 P.M. timeslot, cancelling acclaimed shows like sketch comedy TV Pirata. The unexpected success of Pantanal put Rede Manchete on the roll of top telenovela producers in Latin America. Nevertheless, Rede Manchete would never achieve the same success with the network's other telenovelas.

Eighteen years after its original success, Pantanal once again beat Rede Globo on the ratings. The episode aired on July 3, 2008, by SBT and it spent 16 minutes on the leadership on the Greater São Paulo area.

== Cultural references ==
Because of its success, Pantanal's footage is shown on the Simon Hartog documentary Beyond Citizen Kane, aired on United Kingdom's Channel 4. The documentary is a critical piece of Rede Globo.

== Remake ==
On September 6, 2020, TV Globo announced that a new version of the series would be produced. The series was adapted by Bruno Luperi and featured Jesuíta Barbosa and Alanis Guillen in the lead roles.
