= A Fazenda 18 =

A Fazenda
- Season 18
- Hosted by: Adriane Galisteu
- No. of days: 96
- No. of contestants: 26
- Companion show: A Fazenda Online
- No. of episodes: 95

Release
- Original network: Record
- Original release: September 14, 2026 – present

Season chronology
- ← Previous; Season 17

A Fazenda 18 is the eighteenth season of the Brazilian reality television series A Fazenda, which premiered Monday, September 14, 2026, at 10:30 / 9:30 p.m. (BRT / AMT) on Record.

Adriane Galisteu returned for her sixth season as the main host. Christina Rocha joined the show's digital team, replacing Lucas Selfie as the host of the online companion programs and the show's official podcast. Márcia Fu also returned as the host of the comedic eviction-night segment.

== Contestants ==
The twenty-two original contestants of the eighteenth season were announced by Record during the season premiere on September 14, 2026. Four additional visitors were also introduced as part of the season's opening twist. Below is the list of contestants, including their occupations and ages at the beginning of filming.

Contestant	Age	Background	Hometown	Entered	Exited	Status	Finish
Stephanie Gomes	26	Digital influencer	Rio de Janeiro	Day 1	Day 12	Eliminated 1st on September 24, 2026	26th
Adryana Ribeiro	52	Singer-songwriter	São Paulo	Day 1	Day 19	Eliminated 2nd on October 1, 2026	25th
Renê Thristan	29	Actor	Santos	Day 2	Day 26	Eliminated 3rd on October 8, 2026	24th
Igor Monteiro	37	Model	São Luís	Day 2	Day 33	Eliminated 4th on October 15, 2026	23rd
Jottapê	26	Singer & Actor	Corumbá	Day 1	Day 34	1st Walked on October 16, 2026	22nd
Jonatas Faro	39	Actor	Niterói	Day 1	Day 40	2nd Walked on October 22, 2026	21st
Catherine Bascoy	25	Digital influencer	São Paulo	Day 1	Day 40	Eliminated 5th on October 22, 2026	20th
Gabriel Torres	36	TV host	Campinas	Day 1	Day 41	3rd Walked on October 23, 2026	19th
Giovanna Gold	62	Actress	Salvador	Day 2	Day 47	Eliminated 6th on October 29, 2026	18th
Mônica Fonseca	32	Journalist	Pelotas	Day 1	Day 49	Ejected on October 31, 2026	17th
Rikardo Negro	36	Model	Niquelândia	Day 1	Day 54	Eliminated 7th on November 5, 2026	16th
Murilo Dias	35	Fitness influencer	Brasília	Day 1	Day 61	Eliminated 8th on November 12, 2026	15th
Lucas Bissoli	36	Doctor	Serra	Day 1	Day 68	Eliminated 9th on November 19, 2026	14th
Alfredo Amaral	37	Businessman	Contagem	Day 1		Participating	
Ana Bruna Ávila	30	Digital influencer	Florianópolis	Day 2		Participating	
Ariela Carasso	38	Event producer	São Paulo	Day 1		Participating	
Daniel Erthal	44	Actor	Bom Jardim	Day 1		Participating	
Darlin Ferrattry	47	Businesswoman	Belém	Day 1		Participating	
Eduarda Braum	25	Model	Afonso Cláudio	Day 1		Participating	
Fran Almeida	36	Digital influencer	Santa Rosa	Day 1		Participating	
Maíra Charken	48	Actress & TV host	Hilversum, Netherlands	Day 1		Participating	
Mayk Leão	32	Digital influencer	Campo Largo	Day 1		Participating	
Renata del Bianco	41	Actress	São Paulo	Day 1		Participating	
Sérgio Hondjakoff	42	Actor	New York City, U.S.	Day 1		Participating	
Thaíde	58	Rapper	São Paulo	Day 1		Participating	
Tina Calamba	33	Model	Huambo, Angola	Day 1		Participating	

== The game ==
=== The Visitors ===
A total of 26 celebrities entered A Fazenda 18, including 22 official contestants and four visitors: Ana Bruna Ávila, Giovanna Gold, Igor Monteiro, and Renê Thristan. Unlike the official contestants, the four visitors entered the game temporarily and were given information about the 22 contestants before entering the headquarters.

During the first days of the season, the Visitors were given powers to interfere in the game and participate in its initial dynamics while competing for the opportunity to become official contestants. On Day 5, two public votes were held to determine how many of the four Visitors would remain in the competition. The vote resulted in all four Visitors being permanently incorporated into the main cast.

=== Fire challenge ===
Each week, contestants (determined by a random draw) compete in the Fire challenge to win the Lamp power. The Lamp power entitles the holder to two flames (Yellow and Red), which may unleash good or bad consequences on the nomination process, with the Red flame power defined by the public through the show's profile on R7.com among two options.

Week		Players		Winner	Sent to the Stall	Consequences
1	Day 2	(none)			Gabriel, Jonatas, Murilo, Sérgio (Visitors' choice)	Stall contestants are guaranteed to compete in the Farmer's challenge and cannot be vetoed by Visitors.
1	Day 8	Ana Bruna		Thaíde	Ana Bruna, Sérgio, Daniel, Igor	Thaíde: The holder wins a R$5,000 prize if they choose to leave the House without hot water for 48 hours → Accepted.; Mayk: The holder's vote (Giovanna) will count as 4.
1	Day 8	Sérgio		Thaíde	Ana Bruna, Sérgio, Daniel, Igor	Thaíde: The holder wins a R$5,000 prize if they choose to leave the House without hot water for 48 hours → Accepted.; Mayk: The holder's vote (Giovanna) will count as 4.
1	Day 8	Thaíde		Thaíde	Ana Bruna, Sérgio, Daniel, Igor	Thaíde: The holder wins a R$5,000 prize if they choose to leave the House without hot water for 48 hours → Accepted.; Mayk: The holder's vote (Giovanna) will count as 4.
2		Adryana	Lucas	Rikardo	Adryana, Ariela, Mônica, Renê	Jottapê: The holder must swap two contestants in the Stall for another two contestants in the House → Mônica for Mayk, Renê for Tina.; Rikardo: The hold must protect one of the four nominees from being banned from the Farmer's challenge → Adryana.
2		Alfredo	Mônica	Rikardo	Adryana, Ariela, Mônica, Renê	Jottapê: The holder must swap two contestants in the Stall for another two contestants in the House → Mônica for Mayk, Renê for Tina.; Rikardo: The hold must protect one of the four nominees from being banned from the Farmer's challenge → Adryana.
2		Ariela	Murilo	Rikardo	Adryana, Ariela, Mônica, Renê	Jottapê: The holder must swap two contestants in the Stall for another two contestants in the House → Mônica for Mayk, Renê for Tina.; Rikardo: The hold must protect one of the four nominees from being banned from the Farmer's challenge → Adryana.
2		Catherine	Renata	Rikardo	Adryana, Ariela, Mônica, Renê	Jottapê: The holder must swap two contestants in the Stall for another two contestants in the House → Mônica for Mayk, Renê for Tina.; Rikardo: The hold must protect one of the four nominees from being banned from the Farmer's challenge → Adryana.
2		Gabriel	Renê	Rikardo	Adryana, Ariela, Mônica, Renê	Jottapê: The holder must swap two contestants in the Stall for another two contestants in the House → Mônica for Mayk, Renê for Tina.; Rikardo: The hold must protect one of the four nominees from being banned from the Farmer's challenge → Adryana.
2		Jottapê	Rikardo	Rikardo	Adryana, Ariela, Mônica, Renê	Jottapê: The holder must swap two contestants in the Stall for another two contestants in the House → Mônica for Mayk, Renê for Tina.; Rikardo: The hold must protect one of the four nominees from being banned from the Farmer's challenge → Adryana.
3		Eduarda		Eduarda	Igor, Jonatas, Thaíde, Daniel	Eduarda: The holder wins $8,000 by accepting to swap places with someone from the Stall (Jonatas). If they decline, the $8,000 will be split among the four contestants in the Stall → Accepted.; Alfredo: The holder must choose a contestant to have the holder make their save when it is their turn in the Save Chain → Thaíde.
3		Igor		Eduarda	Igor, Jonatas, Thaíde, Daniel	Eduarda: The holder wins $8,000 by accepting to swap places with someone from the Stall (Jonatas). If they decline, the $8,000 will be split among the four contestants in the Stall → Accepted.; Alfredo: The holder must choose a contestant to have the holder make their save when it is their turn in the Save Chain → Thaíde.
3		Jonatas		Eduarda	Igor, Jonatas, Thaíde, Daniel	Eduarda: The holder wins $8,000 by accepting to swap places with someone from the Stall (Jonatas). If they decline, the $8,000 will be split among the four contestants in the Stall → Accepted.; Alfredo: The holder must choose a contestant to have the holder make their save when it is their turn in the Save Chain → Thaíde.
3		Thaíde		Eduarda	Igor, Jonatas, Thaíde, Daniel	Eduarda: The holder wins $8,000 by accepting to swap places with someone from the Stall (Jonatas). If they decline, the $8,000 will be split among the four contestants in the Stall → Accepted.; Alfredo: The holder must choose a contestant to have the holder make their save when it is their turn in the Save Chain → Thaíde.
4		Gabriel		Mayk	Alfredo, Fran, Giovanna, Maíra, Mônica, Rikardo (Lost the preliminary round)	Mayk: The holder must choose between two immunity powers: the Farmer's nomination or the Save chain.; Darlin: The holder must pass all the votes that any contestant received (Tina) to another contestant who has received at least one vote (Igor).
4		Mayk		Mayk	Alfredo, Fran, Giovanna, Maíra, Mônica, Rikardo (Lost the preliminary round)	Mayk: The holder must choose between two immunity powers: the Farmer's nomination or the Save chain.; Darlin: The holder must pass all the votes that any contestant received (Tina) to another contestant who has received at least one vote (Igor).
4		Murilo		Mayk	Alfredo, Fran, Giovanna, Maíra, Mônica, Rikardo (Lost the preliminary round)	Mayk: The holder must choose between two immunity powers: the Farmer's nomination or the Save chain.; Darlin: The holder must pass all the votes that any contestant received (Tina) to another contestant who has received at least one vote (Igor).
5		Darlin		Jonatas	Darlin, Eduarda, Thaíde, Murilo	Jonatas: The holder must grant immunity to two contestants from the House vote → Jonatas and Maíra.; Ana Bruna: The holder must choose a contestant from the Stall to be the third nominee → Thaíde.
5		Eduarda		Jonatas	Darlin, Eduarda, Thaíde, Murilo	Jonatas: The holder must grant immunity to two contestants from the House vote → Jonatas and Maíra.; Ana Bruna: The holder must choose a contestant from the Stall to be the third nominee → Thaíde.
5		Jonatas		Jonatas	Darlin, Eduarda, Thaíde, Murilo	Jonatas: The holder must grant immunity to two contestants from the House vote → Jonatas and Maíra.; Ana Bruna: The holder must choose a contestant from the Stall to be the third nominee → Thaíde.
5		Thaíde		Jonatas	Darlin, Eduarda, Thaíde, Murilo	Jonatas: The holder must grant immunity to two contestants from the House vote → Jonatas and Maíra.; Ana Bruna: The holder must choose a contestant from the Stall to be the third nominee → Thaíde.
6		Fran		Fran	Maíra, Ana Bruna, Alfredo, Lucas	Fran: The holder must swap two contestants in the Stall for another two contestants in the House → Lucas for Mayk, Alfredo for Tina.; Mônica: The holder must replace the fourth nominee (Eduarda) with any contestant from the House or the Stall → Ana Bruna.
6		Maíra		Fran	Maíra, Ana Bruna, Alfredo, Lucas	Fran: The holder must swap two contestants in the Stall for another two contestants in the House → Lucas for Mayk, Alfredo for Tina.; Mônica: The holder must replace the fourth nominee (Eduarda) with any contestant from the House or the Stall → Ana Bruna.
7		Ariela		~~Daniel~~ (Bribed out for R$10,000); Thaíde (Won power by lotery)	Ariela, Eduarda, Mayk, Renata, Sérgio	Thaíde: The holder is immune.; Rikardo: The holder must replace the nominee banned from the Farmer's challenge (Renata) → Eduarda.
7		Daniel		~~Daniel~~ (Bribed out for R$10,000); Thaíde (Won power by lotery)	Ariela, Eduarda, Mayk, Renata, Sérgio	Thaíde: The holder is immune.; Rikardo: The holder must replace the nominee banned from the Farmer's challenge (Renata) → Eduarda.
7		Eduarda		~~Daniel~~ (Bribed out for R$10,000); Thaíde (Won power by lotery)	Ariela, Eduarda, Mayk, Renata, Sérgio	Thaíde: The holder is immune.; Rikardo: The holder must replace the nominee banned from the Farmer's challenge (Renata) → Eduarda.
7		Mayk		~~Daniel~~ (Bribed out for R$10,000); Thaíde (Won power by lotery)	Ariela, Eduarda, Mayk, Renata, Sérgio	Thaíde: The holder is immune.; Rikardo: The holder must replace the nominee banned from the Farmer's challenge (Renata) → Eduarda.
7		Renata		~~Daniel~~ (Bribed out for R$10,000); Thaíde (Won power by lotery)	Ariela, Eduarda, Mayk, Renata, Sérgio	Thaíde: The holder is immune.; Rikardo: The holder must replace the nominee banned from the Farmer's challenge (Renata) → Eduarda.
8		Alfredo; Sérgio		Alfredo; Sérgio	Fran, Murilo, Thaíde, Tina	Sérgio: The holder must nullify the votes cast by four contestants in the House vote → Ariela, Lucas, Maíra, Sérgio.; Alfredo: The holder must choose two contestants (Fran and Thaíde), and the Farmer (Mayk) must decide which one becomes the fourth nominee → Fran.
8		Fran; Thaíde		Alfredo; Sérgio	Fran, Murilo, Thaíde, Tina	Sérgio: The holder must nullify the votes cast by four contestants in the House vote → Ariela, Lucas, Maíra, Sérgio.; Alfredo: The holder must choose two contestants (Fran and Thaíde), and the Farmer (Mayk) must decide which one becomes the fourth nominee → Fran.
8		Murilo; Tina		Alfredo; Sérgio	Fran, Murilo, Thaíde, Tina	Sérgio: The holder must nullify the votes cast by four contestants in the House vote → Ariela, Lucas, Maíra, Sérgio.; Alfredo: The holder must choose two contestants (Fran and Thaíde), and the Farmer (Mayk) must decide which one becomes the fourth nominee → Fran.

=== Delegations ===
	Week 1	Week 2	Week 3	Week 4	Week 5	Week 6	Week 7	Week 8	Week 9	Week 10	Week 11	Week 12	Week 13
Farmer of the week	Fran	Darlin	Sérgio	Jottapê	Alfredo	Thaíde	Ana Bruna	Mayk	Fran	Ana Bruna			
Obligations
Cows & Bull	Renê; Rikardo	Eduarda; Thaíde	Ana Bruna; Igor	Catherine; Murilo	Giovanna; Thaíde	Alfredo; ~~Jonatas~~; Eduarda	Sérgio; ~~Mônica~~; Alfredo	Fran; Murilo	Alfredo; Ariela	Sérgio; Tina			
Horse	Mônica	Murilo	Daniel	Alfredo	Catherine	Lucas	Rikardo	~~Rikardo~~; Alfredo	Mayk	Eduarda			
Mini goats	Catherine	Mayk	Giovanna	Fran	Darlin	Daniel	Maíra	Ana Bruna	Lucas	Darlin			
Sheep	Jottapê	Jônatas	Tina	Mônica	~~Igor~~; Murilo	Tina	Lucas	Thaíde	Sérgio	Thaíde			
Pigs	Lucas	Jottapê	~~Adryana~~; Catherine	Daniel	Ana Bruna	Fran	~~Giovanna~~; Thaíde	Renata	Tina	Mayk			
Garden & Plants	Thaíde	Renata	Gabriel	Gabriel	Rikardo	~~Gabriel~~; Giovanna	Renata	Tina	Darlin	Maíra			
Birds	Darlin	Mônica	Ariela	Maíra	Renata	Mayk	Fran	Lucas	Maíra	Fran			
Trash	Alfredo	Giovanna	Rikardo	Ariela	Fran	Sérgio	Murilo	Daniel	Ana Bruna	Renata			
Camera operator	Maíra	Fran	Mayk	Sérgio	~~Jottapê~~; Tina	~~Catherine~~; Mônica	Ariela	Maíra	Daniel	Ariela			
Farm's ranch
Farmer's guests	Jottapê; Maíra; Mônica	Ariela; Maíra; Mayk	Daniel; Darlin; Tina	Igor; Rikardo; Thaíde	Eduarda; Gabriel; Mayk	Fran; Mônica; Rikardo	Darlin; Maíra; Tina	Ariela; Maíra; Tina	Daniel; Renata; Thaíde	Darlin			(none)

=== Voting history ===
	Week 1			Week 2	Week 3	Week 4	Week 5	Week 6	Week 7	Week 8	Week 9	Week 10	Week 11	Week 12	Week 13
	Day 5		Day 10	Week 2	Week 3	Week 4	Week 5	Week 6	Week 7	Week 8	Week 9	Week 10	Week 11	Week 12	Week 13
	Round 1	Round 2	Day 10	Week 2	Week 3	Week 4	Week 5	Week 6	Week 7	Week 8	Week 9	Week 10	Week 11	Week 12	Week 13
Farmer of the week	(none)		Fran	Darlin	Sérgio	Jottapê	Alfredo	Thaíde	Ana Bruna	Mayk	Fran	Ana Bruna			
Nomination (Farmer)	(none)		Stephanie	Maíra	Renê	Alfredo	Catherine	Darlin	Renata	Murilo	Alfredo				
Nomination (House)	(none)		Giovanna	Sérgio	Ariela	Igor	Tina	Giovanna	Rikardo	Daniel	~~Thaíde~~; Darlin				
Nomination (Stall)	(none)		Sérgio	Adryana	Thaíde	Renata	Thaíde	Maíra	Eduarda	Tina	Lucas				
Nomination (Save Chain)	(none)		Darlin	Daniel	Jottapê	Eduarda	Gabriel	~~Eduarda~~; Ana Bruna	Mayk	Fran	Ana Bruna				
Alfredo	Not eligible		Darlin	Sérgio	Ariela	Igor	Farmer of the week	Giovanna	Rikardo	Daniel	Thaíde				
Alfredo	Not eligible		Darlin	Sérgio	Ariela	Renata	Farmer of the week	Giovanna	Rikardo	Daniel	Thaíde				
Ana Bruna	Visitor; Nominee		Mônica	Sérgio	Lucas	Igor	Fran	Giovanna	Rikardo	Daniel	Thaíde	Farmer of the week			
Ana Bruna	Visitor; Nominee		Mônica	Sérgio	Lucas	Renata	Fran	Giovanna	Rikardo	Daniel	Thaíde	Farmer of the week			
Ariela	Not eligible		Giovanna	Mônica	Mônica	Igor	Fran	Giovanna	Rikardo	~~Sérgio~~	Thaíde				
Ariela	Not eligible		Giovanna	Mônica	Mônica	Renata	Fran	Giovanna	Rikardo	~~Sérgio~~	Thaíde				
Daniel	Not eligible		Renê	Eduarda	Lucas	~~Tina~~ Igor	Tina	Ariela	Alfredo	Ana Bruna	Tina				
Daniel	Not eligible		Renê	Eduarda	Lucas	Renata	Tina	Ariela	Alfredo	Ana Bruna	Tina				
Darlin	Not eligible		Giovanna	Farmer of the week	Maíra	Igor	Fran	Giovanna	Fran	Daniel	Thaíde				
Darlin	Not eligible		Giovanna	Farmer of the week	Maíra	Renata	Fran	Giovanna	Fran	Daniel	Thaíde				
Eduarda	Not eligible		Darlin	Sérgio	Ariela	Igor	Rikardo	Giovanna	Rikardo	Daniel	Thaíde				
Eduarda	Not eligible		Darlin	Sérgio	Ariela	Renata	Rikardo	Giovanna	Rikardo	Daniel	Thaíde				
Fran	Not eligible		Giovanna	Sérgio	Ariela	~~Tina~~ Igor	Tina	Ariela	Alfredo	Ana Bruna	Farmer of the week				
Fran	Not eligible		Giovanna	Sérgio	Ariela	Jonatas	Tina	Ariela	Alfredo	Ana Bruna	Farmer of the week				
Maíra	Not eligible		Renê	Mônica	Darlin	Igor	Fran	Giovanna	Murilo	~~Daniel~~	Thaíde				
Maíra	Not eligible		Renê	Mônica	Darlin	Renata	Fran	Giovanna	Murilo	~~Daniel~~	Thaíde				
Mayk	Not eligible		Giovanna (x4)	Mônica	Maíra	Igor	Fran	Giovanna	Murilo	Daniel	Thaíde				
Mayk	Not eligible		Giovanna (x4)	Mônica	Maíra	Renata	Fran	Giovanna	Murilo	Daniel	Thaíde				
Renata	Not eligible		Darlin	Sérgio	Ariela	~~Tina~~ Igor	Tina	Ariela	Alfredo	Ana Bruna	Tina				
Renata	Not eligible		Darlin	Sérgio	Ariela	Nominee	Tina	Ariela	Alfredo	Ana Bruna	Tina				
Sérgio	Not eligible		Giovanna	Lucas	Farmer of the week	Igor	Fran	Ariela	Rikardo	~~Darlin~~	Thaíde				
Sérgio	Not eligible		Giovanna	Lucas	Farmer of the week	Renata	Fran	Ariela	Rikardo	~~Darlin~~	Thaíde				
Thaíde	Not eligible		Darlin	Sérgio	Ariela	~~Tina~~ Igor	Tina	Farmer of the week	Alfredo	Lucas	Ana Bruna				
Thaíde	Not eligible		Darlin	Sérgio	Ariela	Jonatas	Tina	Farmer of the week	Alfredo	Lucas	Ana Bruna				
Tina	Not eligible		Maíra	Fran	Lucas	Igor	Fran	Giovanna	Rikardo	Lucas	Thaíde				
Tina	Not eligible		Maíra	Fran	Lucas	Renata	Fran	Giovanna	Rikardo	Lucas	Thaíde				
Lucas	Not eligible		Giovanna	Sérgio	Tina	~~Tina~~ Igor	Mayk	Giovanna	Murilo	~~Daniel~~	Sérgio	Evicted (Day 68)			
Lucas	Not eligible		Giovanna	Sérgio	Tina	Jonatas	Mayk	Giovanna	Murilo	~~Daniel~~	Sérgio	Evicted (Day 68)			
Murilo	Not eligible		Renê	Sérgio	Jottapê	~~Tina~~ Igor	Tina	Ariela	Alfredo	Ana Bruna	Evicted (Day 61)				
Murilo	Not eligible		Renê	Sérgio	Jottapê	Jonatas	Tina	Ariela	Alfredo	Ana Bruna	Evicted (Day 61)				
Rikardo	Not eligible		Darlin	Sérgio	Ariela	~~Tina~~ Igor	Tina	Ariela	Maíra	Evicted (Day 54)					
Rikardo	Not eligible		Darlin	Sérgio	Ariela	Jonatas	Tina	Ariela	Maíra	Evicted (Day 54)					
Mônica	Not eligible		Darlin	Sérgio	Ariela	~~Tina~~ Igor	Tina	Ariela	Ejected (Day 49)						
Mônica	Not eligible		Darlin	Sérgio	Ariela	Jonatas	Tina	Ariela	Ejected (Day 49)						
Giovanna	Visitor; Nominee		Darlin	Sérgio	Ariela	~~Tina~~ Igor	Tina	Ariela	Evicted (Day 47)						
Giovanna	Visitor; Nominee		Darlin	Sérgio	Ariela	Jonatas	Tina	Ariela	Evicted (Day 47)						
Gabriel	Not eligible		Giovanna	Sérgio	Ariela	Igor	Sérgio	Walked (Day 41)							
Gabriel	Not eligible		Giovanna	Sérgio	Ariela	Renata	Sérgio	Walked (Day 41)							
Catherine	Not eligible		Renê	Sérgio	Jottapê	~~Tina~~ Igor	Tina	Evicted (Day 40)							
Catherine	Not eligible		Renê	Sérgio	Jottapê	Jonatas	Tina	Evicted (Day 40)							
Jonatas	Not eligible		Darlin	Igor	Mônica	Igor	Lucas	Walked (Day 40)							
Jonatas	Not eligible		Darlin	Igor	Mônica	Nominee	Lucas	Walked (Day 40)							
Jottapê	Not eligible		Darlin	Sérgio	Alfredo	Farmer of the week	Walked (Day 34)								
Igor	Visitor; Nominee		Maíra	Sérgio	Ariela	~~Tina~~ Igor	Evicted (Day 33)								
Igor	Visitor; Nominee		Maíra	Sérgio	Ariela	Jonatas	Evicted (Day 33)								
Renê	Visitor; Nominee		Maíra	Sérgio	Ariela	Evicted (Day 26)									
Adryana	Not eligible		Maíra	Daniel	Evicted (Day 19)										
Stephanie	Not eligible		Maíra	Evicted (Day 12)											
Notes	1		2, 3	4	5	6, 7	8, 9, 10	11, 12	13, 14	15					
Up for nomination	(none)		Stephanie; Giovanna; Sérgio; Darlin	Maíra; Sérgio; Adryana; Daniel	Renê; Ariela; Thaíde; Jottapê	Alfredo; Igor; Renata; Eduarda	Catherine; Tina; Thaíde; Gabriel	Darlin; Giovanna; Maíra; Ana Bruna	Renata; Rikardo; Eduarda; Mayk	Murilo; Daniel; Tina; Fran	Alfredo; Darlin; Lucas; Ana Bruna				
Farmer winner	(none)		Darlin	Sérgio	Jottapê	Alfredo	Thaíde	Ana Bruna	Mayk	Fran	Ana Bruna				
Nominated for eviction	Ana Bruna; Giovanna; Igor; Renê		Giovanna; Sérgio; Stephanie	Adryana; Daniel; Maíra	Ariela; Renê; Thaíde	Eduarda; Igor; Renata	Catherine; Gabriel; Tina	Darlin; Giovanna; Maíra	Eduarda; Renata; Rikardo	Daniel; Murilo; Tina	Alfredo; Darlin; Lucas				
Walked	(none)						Jottapê; Jonatas	Gabriel	(none)						
Ejected	(none)								Mônica	(none)					
Evicted	Ana Bruna; 16.70% to enter	Giovanna; Igor; Renê; 11.72% to enter	Stephanie; 19.71% to save	Adryana; 8.59% to save	Renê; 20.04% to save	Igor; 10.07% to save	Catherine; 13.98% to save	Giovanna; 27.12% to save	Rikardo; 11.32% to save	Murilo; 32.63% to save	Lucas; 28.43% to save				
Evicted	Renê; 18.50% to enter	Giovanna; Igor; 35.49% to enter	Stephanie; 19.71% to save	Adryana; 8.59% to save	Renê; 20.04% to save	Igor; 10.07% to save	Catherine; 13.98% to save	Giovanna; 27.12% to save	Rikardo; 11.32% to save	Murilo; 32.63% to save	Lucas; 28.43% to save				
Survived	Igor; 20.66% to enter	Giovanna; Igor; Renê; Ana Bruna; 52.79% to enter	Giovanna; Most votes to save	Daniel; Most votes to save	Ariela; Most votes to save	Eduarda; Most votes to save	Gabriel; Most votes to save	Darlin; 27.72% to save	Eduarda; Most votes to save	Daniel; 33.61% to save	Alfredo; Most votes to save				
Survived	Giovanna; 44.14% to enter	Giovanna; Igor; Renê; Ana Bruna; 52.79% to enter	Sérgio; Most votes to save	Maíra; Most votes to save	Thaíde; Most votes to save	Renata; Most votes to save	Tina; Most votes to save	Maíra; 45.16% to save	Renata; Most votes to save	Tina; 33.76% to save	Darlin; Most votes to save				

==== Notes ====
- ^Note 1: On Day 5, the Visitors' fate was determined through two separate votes. First, the public voted individually to save each of the four Visitors, with the top two (Igor and Giovanna) guaranteed a place on the Farm. A second vote determined how many of the four Visitors should remain in the game. The options were two (Igor and Giovanna only), three (including Renê), or all four (including Ana Bruna), with the option to keep all four receiving 52.79% of the votes. As a result, Giovanna, Igor, Renê, and Ana Bruna were officially made contestants of A Fazenda 18.
- ^Note 2: On Day 5, eight contestants (Ariela, Daniel, Darlin, Eduarda, Jonatas, Murilo, Rikardo and Tina) competed in four head-to-head duels for immunity. The winners were: Rikardo over Ariela; Jonatas over Darlin; Tina over Daniel; and Eduarda over Murilo.
- ^Note 3: Red Flame holder Mayk had his vote for Giovanna counted as four, tying her with Darlin at nine votes each, with Farmer Fran breaking the tie and making Giovanna the second nominee. Giovanna then chose Sergio from the Stall as the third nominee, who started the Save Chain. Darlin was left over and became the fourth nominee. She then had to ban one of the other nominees from the Farmer's Challenge and chose Giovanna, sending her straight to the public vote.
- ^Note 4: Red Flame holder Rikardo's power allowed him to protect one of the nominees from being banned from the Farmer's Challenge, and he chose Adryana. Daniel, as the fourth nominee, then had to ban one of the other nominees from the Farmer's Challenge and chose Maíra, sending her straight to the public vote.
- ^Note 5: Red Flame holder Alfredo's power allowed him to choose one contestant to replace in the Save Chain. He chose Thaíde (who, as the third nominee, would have started the Save Chain per the rules), then saved Eduarda in his place. Jottapê was left over and became the fourth nominee. He then had to ban one of the other nominees from the Farmer's challenge and chose Renê, sending him straight to the public vote.
- ^Note 6: Tina and Igor tied in the House vote, receiving 11 votes each. Red Flame power holder Darlin transferred all 11 of Tina's votes to Igor, bringing his total to 22 votes and making him the second nominee.
- ^Note 7: In a twist, the usual Stall nomination was replaced by a vote in which only Jônatas and Renata, who had received no negative marks during the season's activities, were eligible to become the third nominee. Renata was nominated by an 11–9 vote and started the Save Chain, which ended with Eduarda being left unchosen. Unlike the usual format, in which the fourth nominee chooses a contestant to be banned from the Farmer's Challenge, the third nominee, Renata, was automatically banned and sent straight to the public vote.
- ^Note 8: On Day 34, Jottapê walked from the game after being distressed by the eviction of his ally, Igor, the previous night.
- ^Note 9: Red Flame power holder Ana Bruna had to choose a contestant from the Stall to become the third nominee and selected Thaíde. Thaíde then started the Save Chain, with Gabriel being left unchosen and becoming the fourth nominee. Gabriel then had to ban one of the other nominees from the Farmer's Challenge and chose Tina, sending her straight to the public vote.
- ^Note 10: On Day 40, Jonatas walked from the game.
- ^Note 11: On Day 41, Gabriel walked from the game.
- ^Note 12: Red Flame power holder Mônica had the power to replace the fourth nominee (Eduarda) with any contestant from the Main House or the Stall. She chose Ana Bruna, who then had to ban one of the other nominees from the Farmer's Challenge. She chose Giovanna, sending her straight to the public vote.
- ^Note 13: On Day 49, Mônica was ejected from the game following a confrontation with Mayk at a party the previous night. The incident left Mayk with cuts to his hands after he fell onto a table containing glass bottles. The production determined that Mônica had endangered another contestant's physical integrity, violating the show's rules.
- ^Note 14: Alfredo and Rikardo received the most votes from the House, with five votes each. Farmer Ana Bruna broke the tie, selecting Rikardo as the second nominee. Rikardo then chose Eduarda from the Stall as the third nominee, who started the Save Chain. Mayk was left unchosen and became the fourth nominee. He then had to ban one of the other nominees from the Farmer's Challenge and chose Renata. However, as the Red Flame power holder, Rikardo was required to replace the nominee banned from the Farmer's Challenge with another contestant. He chose Eduarda, sending her straight to the public vote.
- ^Note 15: Daniel received the most votes from the House, with six. Before the vote was concluded, Sérgio, as the Yellow Flame power holder, had to nullify the votes cast by four contestants. He nullified the votes cast by Maíra, Lucas, Ariela, and himself. As a result, Daniel and Ana Bruna were tied with four votes each. Farmer Mayk broke the tie, selecting Daniel as the second nominee. Daniel then chose Tina from the Stall as the third nominee. Next, Alfredo, as the Red Flame power holder, had to choose two contestants, and the Farmer had to decide which one would become the fourth nominee. Alfredo selected Fran and Thaíde. Mayk chose Fran, who then banned Tina from the Farmer's Challenge, sending her straight to the public vote.

=== Inheritance power ===
This season, each evicted contestant awards two "inheritance" powers to the contestants who survived the public vote, allowing them to influence the course of the game during the following week.

Week	Evicted	Recipient	Inheritance	Used on:
1	Stephanie	Giovanna	Immunity	—N/a
1	Stephanie	Sérgio	Power of Punishment; Banned from the Weekly Party	Ana Bruna; Renê
2	Adryana	Daniel	Immunity	—N/a
2	Adryana	Maíra	Power of Punishment at the Fire Challenge	Murilo; Rikardo
3	Renê	Ariela	Power of Punishment; Sent to the Stall for two nights	Fran
3	Renê	Thaíde	Immunity	—N/a
4	Igor	Eduarda	Power of Punishment in the Fire Challenge	Thaíde
4	Igor	Renata	Power of Immunity	Giovanna
5	Catherine	Gabriel	Power of Immunity	Alfredo
5	Catherine	Tina	R$5,000	—N/a
6	Giovanna	Darlin	Power of Punishment; Suitcases confiscated	—N/a
6	Giovanna	Maíra	Power of Immunity	Ariela
7	Rikardo	Eduarda	R$5,000	—N/a
7	Rikardo	Renata	Immunity	—N/a
8	Murilo	Daniel	Power of Selection; Four contestants sent to the Stall	Darlin, Eduarda, Lucas, Maíra
8	Murilo	Tina	Power of Punishment; Late arrival at the Weekly Party	Alfredo

== Controversies ==
=== Sérgio ===
On September 28, 2026, Ana Bruna accused Sérgio Hondjakoff of sexual harassment during an activity, alleging that he had intentionally pressed his genitals against her while asking for a hug. Hondjakoff denied the allegation, stating that the contact had not occurred as described and that there was no malicious intent. He was also accused by other contestants of racism, xenophobia, and religious intolerance. The following day, Record stated that it had reviewed the footage and decided against removing him from the show, while host Adriane Galisteu warned Hondjakoff to be careful with his conduct, stating that some situations had come close to requiring intervention.

=== Daniel ===
On September 30, 2026, Mônica Fonseca accused Daniel Erthal of physical aggression after he poked her forcefully in the back. Mônica said the contact left a red mark and called for his removal from the show. Erthal acknowledged poking her but said he had not meant to hurt her. The following day, Record aired footage of the incident but did not announce any disciplinary action against him.

=== Giovanna ===
On October 20, 2026, during a heated argument with Mayk Leão, Giovanna Gold made comments about his sexuality that were considered homophobic by the show's production. The remarks prompted host Adriane Galisteu to issue her a formal warning during a live show, emphasizing that discriminatory behavior could lead to disciplinary action, including ejection. A week later, during the live nominations on October 27, Giovanna publicly identified as bisexual and apologized to the LGBTQ+ community, saying she considered herself part of it. Following her eviction, she denied making homophobic remarks and accused Mayk of ageism. She also expressed regret over not having reported what she described as psychological abuse during her time on the show.

== Ratings and reception ==
=== Brazilian ratings ===
All numbers are in points and provided by Kantar Ibope Media.

Week	First air date	Last air date	Timeslot (BRT)	Daily SP viewers (in points)							SP viewers (in points)	BR viewers (in points)	Ref.
Week	First air date	Last air date	Timeslot (BRT)	Mon	Tue	Wed	Thu	Fri	Sat	Sun	SP viewers (in points)	BR viewers (in points)	Ref.
1	September 14, 2026	September 20, 2026	Monday to Saturday; 10:30 p.m. Sunday; 11:15 p.m.	5.6	4.0	4.4	4.0	5.0	4.2	4.2	4.5	Outside top 10	
2	September 21, 2026	September 27, 2026	Monday to Saturday; 10:30 p.m. Sunday; 11:15 p.m.	4.9	4.2	4.9	4.8	4.0	4.2	4.3	4.5	Outside top 10	
3	September 28, 2026	October 4, 2026	Monday to Saturday; 10:30 p.m. Sunday; 11:15 p.m.	4.6	5.8	5.8	5.5	5.6	4.3	4.9	5.2	4.2	
4	October 5, 2026	October 11, 2026	Monday to Saturday; 10:30 p.m. Sunday; 11:15 p.m.	5.1	5.9	5.4	6.4	5.1	4.0	4.5	5.3	4.3	
5	October 12, 2026	October 18, 2026	Monday to Saturday; 10:30 p.m. Sunday; 11:15 p.m.	5.1	5.6	5.4	5.1	5.0	3.5	3.7	4.7	Outside top 10	
6	October 19, 2026	October 25, 2026	Monday to Saturday; 10:30 p.m. Sunday; 11:15 p.m.	5.5	5.4	5.2	4.9	3.4	4.1	4.0	4.6	Outside top 10	
7	October 26, 2026	November 1, 2026	Monday to Saturday; 10:30 p.m. Sunday; 11:15 p.m.	4.3	5.8	5.0	5.6	5.7	5.3	4.2	5.1	Outside top 10	
8	November 2, 2026	November 8, 2026	Monday to Saturday; 10:30 p.m. Sunday; 11:15 p.m.	5.0	5.3	4.8	5.5	5.3	5.0	4.5	5.0		
9	November 9, 2026	November 15, 2026	Monday to Saturday; 10:30 p.m. Sunday; 11:15 p.m.	5.4	5.6	5.0	6.3						

- In 2026, each point represents 277.669 households in 15 market cities in Brazil (78.780 households in São Paulo).
