= Ângela Vieira =

Brazilian actress

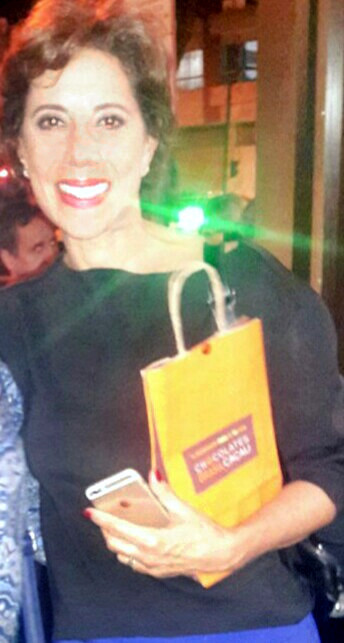
Ângela Vieira in 2016

Ângela Regina Vieira (born March 3, 1952) is a Brazilian stage and TV actress. She was also previously a ballet dancer. She was married to actor Roberto Frota, with whom they had a daughter, Nina.

== Theatre ==
- 1979 – Chapeuzinho quase Vermelho
- 1980 – A História é uma História
- 1981 – A História é uma História – Municipal de Niterói theatre
- 1982 – A Nova Era (musical) – Papagaio Café Cabaré theatre
- 1982 – O Parto da Búfala – Gláucio Gil theatre
- 1984 – Encouraçado Botequim (musical)
- 1985 – Um Beijo, um Abraço e um Aperto de Mão – Villa Lobos theatre
- 1986 – O Peru – Ginástico theatre
- 1987 – Camas Redondas, Casais Quadrados – text: J. Chapman, direction: José Renato, teatros Ginástico e da Praia
- 1989 – Tem um Psicanalista na nossa Cama
- 1990 – Somente entre nós – Cassino Estoril theatre in Lisbon
- 1991 – Ato Cultural – Cândido Mendes theatre
- 1992 – Se Eu Fosse Você
- 1993 – Se Eu Fosse Você
- 1994 – Meus Prezados Canalhas
- 1997/98 – Salve Amizade – texto e direção: Flávio Marinho, tournée pelo Brasil
- 2004 – A Presença de Guedes

== Music ==
- 1998 - João de todos os Sambas
- 2002 - Divina Saudade
- 2002 - Mania de Vocês

== TV filmography ==
- 2014 - Em Família - Branca
- 2013 - Flor do Caribe - Lindaura
- 2011 - Fina Estampa - Mirna Bello/Gisela
- 2011 - Insensato Coração - Gisela
- 2010 - Na Forma da Lei - Eunice
- 2009 - Cinquentinha - Leila Fratelli
- 2008 - A Favorita - Arlete
- 2007 - Paraíso Tropical - Cleonice
- 2006 - Cobras & Lagartos - Celina
- 2005 - Carga Pesada (série)
- 2004 - Senhora do Destino - Gisela
- 2003 - Kubanacan - Perla Perón
- 2002 - Coração de Estudante - Esmeralda
- 2001 - Sai de Baixo (programa de humor)
- 2001 - Brava Gente (série)
- 2001 - Os Normais (série)
- 2000 - Aquarela do Brasil - Velma (minissérie)
- 1999 - Terra Nostra - Janete
- 1998 - Meu Bem Querer - Ava Gardner Maria Ferreira de Souza
- 1997 - Por Amor - Virgínia
- 1996 - Anjo de Mim - Zelinda
- 1996 - O Fim do Mundo - Margarida Socó
- 1995 - A Idade da Loba - Irene (Rede Bandeirantes)
- 1991 - O fantasma da ópera - Anabela Vasconcelos (minissérie - Rede Manchete)
- 1990 - Araponga - Jurema
- 1988 - Olho por Olho - Elisa (Rede Manchete)
- 1987 - Corpo Santo - Mara (Rede Manchete)
- 1981 - Viva o Gordo (elenco fixo) - programa de humor
- 1986 - Qualificação Profissional (TV Educativa)
- 1986 - Armação Ilimitada: episódio – Os Olhos de Zelda Scott
- 1983 - Os Trapalhões (programa de humor)
- 1983 - Quarta Nobre: episódio – Mandrake - Louise
- 1982 - Parabéns pra Você - Marlene (minissérie)
- 1982 - Mário Fofoca - Marjô (episódio – Espiões de Biquini)
- 1979 - Chico Anysio Show (programa de humor)
- 1978 - Planeta dos Homens (elenco fixo) - programa de humor
- 1979 - Chico Anysio Show (programa de humor)
- 1979 - TV Educativa (aulas de dança moderna)

== Choreography ==
- 1985 - Astrofolias - texto: Ana Luiza Jobim, direção musical: Antônio Adolfo, direção: Lauro Góes, Teatro Villa Lobos e Teatro do Planetário da Gávea
- 1985 - Zabadan - direção musical: Carlão, direção: Sérgio Carvalhal - Teatro América
- 1988/93 - São Pedro - texto: Benjamim Santos, direção: Ginaldo de Souza - Urca, Posto Seis e Colônia do Cajú
- 1989 - Cem Anos da República - texto: Benjamim Santos, direção musical: Roberto Nascimento, direção: Ginaldo de Souza - Arcos da Lapa
