= Supermanoela =

- Genre: Telenovela
- Created by: Walther Negrão
- Directed by: Gonzaga Blota; Reynaldo Boury
- Starring: Marília Pêra; Paulo José; Daisy Lúcidi; Carlos Vereza; Fausto Rocha
- Opening theme: "Supermanoela" by Betinho
- Country of origin: Brazil
- Original language: Portuguese
- No. of episodes: 137

Production
- Running time: 45 minutes

Original release
- Network: TV Globo
- Release: 21 January – 2 July 1974

Related
- Carinhoso; Corrida do Ouro

Supermanoela is a Brazilian telenovela produced and broadcast by TV Globo. It premiered on 21 January 1974 and ended on 5 June 1974, with a total of 137 episodes. It is the thirteenth "novela das sete" to be aired in the timeslot. It was created by Walther Negrão and directed by Gonzaga Blota.

The series is completely missing from any archive and is now considered lost.

== Cast ==
Actor	Character
Marília Pêra	Manoela
Paulo José	Marcelo
Carlos Vereza	Solano
Antônio Pedro	Francisco (Chico)
Fausto Rocha	Gabriel
Carlos Alberto Riccelli	Ribamar
Daisy Lucidi	Maria Elvira
Rubens de Falco	Delegado Diógenes
Carmem Monegal	Sílvia Mendes
Irene Stefânia	Laurita Bueno
Francisco Dantas	Donato Mendes
Zilka Salaberry	Carolina Mendes
Urbano Lóes	Seu Julião
Rosita Thomaz Lopes	Dona Cibele
Manfredo Colassanti	Seu Nicolau Mendes
Sérgio Britto	Jorge Bueno
Zezé Motta	Doralice
Gracindo Júnior	Mário
Suzana Gonçalves	Regina Mendes
Roberto Pirillo	Paulo
Lúcia Alves	Raquel
Rogério Fróes	Kico
Diana Morel	Tereza
Arnaldo Weiss	Nabuco
Apolo Correia	Seu Felipe
Margarida Rey	Dona Lígia
Jorge Botelho	Luiz (Lula)
Kátia D'Angelo	Roseli
Vinícius Salvatori	Tiago
Teresa Cristina Arnaud	Kate
João Signorelli	Fernando
Ada Chaseliov	Marlene
