= Corpo Dourado =

- Genre: Romance; Drama
- Created by: Antônio Calmon
- Starring: Cristiana Oliveira; Humberto Martins; Marcos Winter; Maria Luísa Mendonça; Gerson Brenner; Fábio Júnior; Danielle Winits; Bianca Byington; Giovanna Antonelli; Felipe Camargo; Ana Rosa; Fernanda Rodrigues; Marcelo Faria; Lucinha Lins; Rosamaria Murtinho; Flávio Galvão; Felipe Folgosi; Mônica Carvalho see more
- Opening theme: Somente o Sol by Deborah Blando
- Country of origin: Brazil
- Original language: Portuguese
- No. of episodes: 191

Production
- Production location: Brazil
- Running time: 50 minutes (approx.)

Original release
- Network: Rede Globo
- Release: 12 January – 21 August 1998

Related
- Zazá; Meu Bem Querer

Corpo Dourado (Summer Affair) is a Brazilian soap opera produced by and shown on Rede Globo from 12 January 1998 through 21 August 1998. The 191 chapters were written by Antônio Calmon and directed by Flávio Colatrello Jr, and later Marcos Schetchman.

== Synopsis ==
Selena farmer is a fiber young woman who does not rest while trying to extract a secret from her mother Camila: the identity of her father. But she also dreams of one day having the love of Chico, the commission agent of the coastal city of Marimbá. Only that it is complicated investigating a mysterious murder.

The two form a love triangle with Arturzinho, São Paulo entrepreneur of the branch of footwear. The stormy Amanda, who abandons Arturzinho at the altar to marry Chico, is the owner of the tannery that supplies the plant of shoes, and reluta in accepting the revelation of that Selena is his bastard sister. Breaching with Arturzinho's family, Amanda provokes the financial destruction of the shoe factory.

The crime shakes the family of Arturzinho still more: its father, Zé Paulo, are assassinated. One is uncovered then video ribbon where Zé Pablo asks for to the son to be married Selena and to save the finances of the family. Initially, Arturzinho and Selena if detestam. It sees it as "maricas", distant of its reality, while it considers it one "machona without education". E still: how Arturzinho goes to explain the situation for Alicinha, its case?

Despite the differences and the problems, Arturzinho and Selena they finish if involving, for desperation delegated it Chico, that was gotten passionate for the farmer, if moving away each time more from Amanda, who already displays serious psychological problems.

There is another love triangle, formed by Judy, her boyfriend Tadeu and Billy, the mysterious photographer who arrives at the folloied city of the Zeca son. Billy, whose character remains mysterious for all the tram, finishes up having an involvement with Amanda.

== Cast ==
Detached the protagonists

- Adriana Garambone - Soninha
- Ana Rosa - Camila
- André Ricardo - Duca
- Antônio Petrin - Ezequiel
- Bianca Byington - Diana
- Carlos Vereza - Silveira / Colonel Tinoco
- Cláudia Lira - Débora
- Cristiana Oliveira - Selena
- Daniel Ávila - Kris
- Danielle Winits - Alicinha
- Fábio Jr. - Billy
- Felipe Camargo - Tadeu
- Felipe Folgosi - Lucas/Mateus
- Fernanda Rodrigues - Lígia
- Flávio Galvão - Orlando
- Gerson Brenner - Jorginho
- Giovanna Antonelli - Judy
- Hugo Carvana - Jacinto Azevedo
- Humberto Martins - Chico
- Isabel Fillardis - Noêmia
- Java Mayan - Zeca
- José de Abreu - Renato
- Joyce Caldas - Ana
- Lafayette Galvão - Epaminondas
- Lucinha Lins - Hilda
- Ludmila Dayer - Bibí
- Lui Mendes - Nando
- Mara Carvalho - Laís
- Marcelo Faria - Guto
- Marcos Winter - Arturzinho
- Maria Gladys - Mazinha
- Maria Luísa Mendonça - Amanda
- Mônica Carvalho - Clara
- Paulo Reis - Aderbal
- Pedro Guaraná - Severino
- Roberto Frota - Romão
- Rosamaria Murtinho - Isabel
- Sebastião Vasconcelos - Sérvulo
- Thaís Caldas - Lana
- Thaís Fersoza - Ritinha
- Zezé Motta - Liana

Participation special

- Lima Duarte - Zé Paulo
- Luíza Curvo - Clara (child)
- Zilka Salaberry - Celeste sister

== Embroidery frames ==
- In the opening the name of Cristiana Oliveira, was wrong credited as Cristiana "of" Oliveira.
- The General Average was of 37 points, being satisfactory for the schedule.

track

- Somente o Sol (Only the Sun) - Deborah Blando (opening subject)
- Vivo por ella (Living creature for It) - Andrea Bocelli e Sandy

== Soundtrack ==
=== National ===
1. Vivo Por Ella - Andrea Bocelli & Sandy
2. Pra Te Ter Aqui - Netinho
3. Coração Vazio - Michael Sullivan
4. Pura Emoção (Achy Breaky Heart) - Chitãozinho e Xororó
5. Somente o Sol (I'm Not in Love) - Deborah Blando
6. Realidade Virtual - Cidade Negra
7. Grama Verde - Adriana Maciel
8. Choveu - Blitz
9. Dois - Paulo Ricardo
10. O Que Você Quer - Rita Lee
11. Quase - Daúde
12. Hanime - Ive
13. Me Liga - Patricia Marx
14. Se Todos Fosssem Iguas a Você - Claudia Telles

=== International ===
1. I Will Come To You - Hanson
2. My All - Mariah Carey
3. Torn - Natalie Imbruglia
4. Angels - Robbie Williams
5. You Sexy Thing - T-shirt
6. Secrets - Nicki French
7. The Mummer's Dance - Loreena McKennitt
8. How Do I Live - Debra Michaels
9. Whenever I Call You Friend - Michael Johnson featuring Alison Krauss
10. Ain't That Just The Way - Betsy Loop
11. You're Still The One - Shania Twain
12. Take Me As I Am - Faith Hill
13. Say You'll Be Mine - La Bouche
14. Breaking All The Rules - She Moves
15. Sunshyme - Rising Sun
16. Lonely - Stars And Strippers
