= Pé na Jaca =

Brazilian telenovela

- Genre: Telenovela
- Created by: Carlos Lombardi
- Written by: Vinícius Vianna; Filipe Miguez; Nélio Abbade; Sebastião Maciel
- Directed by: Ricardo Waddington
- Starring: Murilo Benício; Deborah Secco; Juliana Paes; Fernanda Lima; Marcos Pasquim
- Opening theme: "Eu Ando Ok" by Zizi Possi
- Country of origin: Brazil
- Original language: Portuguese
- No. of episodes: 179

Production
- Camera setup: Multi-camera
- Running time: 45 minutes

Original release
- Network: TV Globo
- Release: 20 November 2006 – 15 June 2007

Pé na Jaca (lit. English: "Foot in the Jackfruit") is a Brazilian telenovela produced and aired by TV Globo from 20 November 2006 to 15 June 2007.

It stars Murilo Benício, Juliana Paes, Fernanda Lima, Marcos Pasquim, Betty Lago, Fúlvio Stefanini, Alexandre Schumacher, Carla Marins, Ricardo Tozzi, Fernanda de Freitas, Daniele Suzuki, Rodrigo Lombardi, Bruno Garcia, Flávia Alessandra and Deborah Secco in the leading roles.

== Plot ==
In 1984 five children live on a farm near Piracicaba. Arthur spends the holidays at his uncle's farm. Elizabeth is the daughter of a seamstress. Guinevere is the daughter of a maid. Mary is the daughter of a wealthy farmer Lancelotti is the son of a farmer. The farm is on the edge of a river in São Paulo, in the village of "Deus Me Livre" near Piracicaba.

The five play without realizing the social differences that separate them and feel confident that their friendship will last forever. The holidays end and with the exception of Lancelotti and Mary, never meet again.

Twenty-five years pass until fate puts Arthur, Elizabeth, Guinevere, and Maria Lancelotti together again. They meet in the city of Deus Me Livre.

Arthur and Guinevere fall in love. Guinevere was previously married to Kermit (son of millionaire Botelho Bulhões) and had an affair with Lance (Lancelotti or Tico, the more intimate nickname), who is in love with Maria. Maria Bo had a husband Jean Luc, who supported France. He was a bankrupt earl. Maria also had a lover, Thierry. Arthur is married to Vanessa a mercenary who betrayed him with Juan. This helped Elizabeth (who becomes the major villain) in their frames, and encourages her to move to the side of evil. She had a crush on Deodato, who was the mysterious accomplice to Morgana. She had an affair with Merlin's friend, forming a love triangle.

Elizabeth will do anything to harm her former friends, moved only by envy and ambition, even to the extreme by money and power, while other friends join together and try to show her that love and charity are virtues needed to live happy truly.

== Cast ==
- Murilo Benício as Arthur Fortuna
- Deborah Secco as Elizabeth "Beth" Aparecida Barra
- Juliana Paes as Guinevere "Gui" Ataliba dos Santos Fortuna
- Marcos Pasquim as Antônio Carlos Lancelotti
- Fernanda Lima as Maria Bô (Maria Botelho "Maria Bô" Bulhões
- Flávia Alessandra as Vanessa Fortuna
- Bruno Garcia as Juan Arrabal
- Fúlvio Stefanini as Último Botelho Bulhões
- Betty Lago as Maria Carolina Botelho Bulhões "Morgana"
- Carla Marins as Dorinha Isadora "Dorinha" Cabedelo Haddad
- Alexandre Schumacher as Carlos "Caco" Eduardo Botelho Bulhões
- Ricardo Tozzi as Cândido Fortuna Botelho Bulhões
- Fernanda de Freitas as Maria Leila "Lilinha" Barra Botelho Bulhões de Canabrava
- Rodrigo Lombardi as Tadeu Lancelotti
- Sílvia Pfeifer as Maria Clara Botelho Bulhões Noscheze
- Daniele Suzuki as Rosa Tanaka
- Humberto Martins as Merlin Botelho Bulhões / Vasco
- Betty Faria as Laura Barra
- Daniele Valente as Maria Celina
- Carlos Bonow as Edmilson "Ed"
- Elias Gleizer as Giácomo Lancelotti
- Sérgio Hondjakoff as Nuno Botelho Noscheze
- Oscar Magrini as Delegado Palhares
- Alexandre Barros as Átila Noscheze
- Cláudia Ventura as Maria Eduarda "Duda"
- Cristina Sano as Mitiko Tanaka
- Dan Nakagawa as Mário Tanaka
- Dudu Azevedo as Petrônio "Pipoca" Palhares
- Emanuelle Araújo as Clotilda Rodrigues Alves
- Érika Evantini as Mimosa "Mimi" Queirós
- Gero Pestalozzi as Deodato
- Guilherme Piva as Agronildo "Nirdo" Ferreira Sales
- Lucy Ramos as Nina Botelho Noscheze "Guguta"
- Marcelo Torreão as Plácido Haddad
- Maria Estela Rivera as Irina Botelho Bulhões
- Rodrigo Hilbert as Flávio Barra "Barrão"
- Samantha Schmütz as Célia
- Igor Rudolf as Maurício Fortuna
- João Vieira as Zidane Ataliba Botelho Bulhões
- Larissa Biondo as Débora Lancelotti Cabedelo
- Miguel Rômulo as Marcos "Marquinhos" Lancelotti Cabedelo
- Rafael Miguel as Percival Fortuna
- Sofia Terra as Josephine "Jô" Botelho Bulhões
- Chico Anysio as Ezequiel de Jesus "Cigano"
- Leonardo Villar as José Fortuna "Tio José"
- Paulo Goulart as Roberto Vilela
- Walmor Chagas as Canabrava
- Neuza Amaral as Gema
- Arlete Salles as Gioconda
- Lolita Rodrigues as Carmem Cabedelo
- Maria Zilda Bethlem as Alma
- Ilva Niño as Santa Mangabeira de Arrabal
- Bruno Mazzeo as Merlin (young)

== Name ==
The series name comes from the Brazilian popular expression "enfiar o pé na jaca" (literally "to stick one's foot into the jackfruit"), which means doing something stupid or embarrassing, or committing a big mistake/failure, which usually lands someone in severe trouble or as a laughingstock for everyone.
