= Rodrigo Hilbert =

Brazilian television presenter and actor (born 1980)

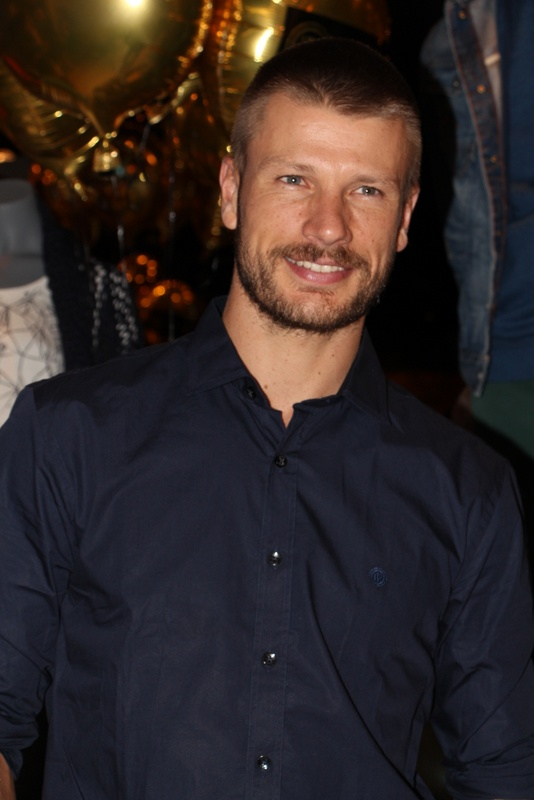
- Hilbert in 2015
- Born: Rodrigo Hilbert Alberton; 22 April 1980 (age 46); Orleans, Santa Catarina, Brazil
- Occupations: Television presenter; actor
- Years active: 1996–present
- Spouse: Fernanda Lima (m. 2020)
- Children: 3

Rodrigo Hilbert Alberton (born 22 April 1980) is a Brazilian television presenter, actor, and former model.

== Early life ==
Rodrigo was born in Orleans, Santa Catarina. He is of German and Italian descent.

== Career ==
Although he also used to think about majoring in Agronomy, Hilbert's dream was inheriting his grandfather's smithery, with whom he used to work. At age 18, Hilbert received an invitation from a modeling agency to be one of their models in Rio de Janeiro, causing him to abandon his plans and move cities.

As a model, he was one of the faces of Versace. In his first video audition, he got the role in the soap opera Desejos de Mulher, in 2002. He publicly stated that he did not do well in the role due to not having prepared himself to be an actor.

Then he studied interpretation for four years, acted in two movies and had small roles in two more soap operas, in Da Cor do Pecado and Senhora do Destino. Later, he made a huge success when he portrayed Murilinho in América.

With some friends, he set up a theater company Elza Gomes and traveled throughout Brazil with the play Duelo.

In 2007 he took part in Dança dos Famosos, the Brazilian equivalent of Strictly Come Dancing, in the TV show Domingão do Faustão, when he surprised everyone and got a lot of compliments from expert reviewers of the TV show jury and he was the winner.

== Personal life ==
In 2003 he began to date the presenter Fernanda Lima, breaking up with her at the end of that year. Soon after he had a relationship of a few months with the actress Juliana Paes.

Hilbert and Fernanda resumed dating in September 2004. At the end of 2007, the couple announced that they were expecting twins, João and Francisco, who were born on April 20, 2008. They have lived together in a cohabitation since 2006 and the couple legally married in 2020.

== Filmography ==
=== Television ===
Year	Title	Role	Notes
2002	Desejos de Mulher	Pablo Jardim	
2002	A Grande Família	Surfer	Episode: "O Chamado da Natureza"
2003	Sob Nova Direção	Nuno	Episode: "O Pinto e o Pingüim"
2004	Senhora do Destino	Ruddy	Episode: "29 June 2004"
2004	Da Cor do Pecado	Roberval	Episode: "5–17 July 2004"
2005	América	Murilo Gouveia (Murilinho)	
2006	Pé na Jaca	Flávio Barra (Barrão)	
2007	Dança dos Famosos	Contest	Season 4
2007	Duas Caras	Ronildo do Anjos	
2008	Três Irmãs	Gregório de Matos (Greg)	
2009	Viver a Vida	Felipe Fagundes Muniz	
2011	Morde & Assopra	Fernando Guedes	
2011	Fina Estampa	Alexandre Lopes (Alex)	
2012–present	Tempero de Família	Presenter	
2013	Louco por Elas	Júlio Cezar	Episode: "Léo se Sente Rejeitado Pelo Time"
2017	Tá no Ar	Himself	Episode: "21 March 2017"

=== Film ===
Year	Title	Role
2004	Irmãos de Fé	Tito
2008	O Guerreiro Didi e a Ninja Lili	Lucas
2009	Flordelis: Basta uma Palavra para Mudar	Israel

=== Internet ===
Year	Title	Role	Notes
2015	Porta dos Fundos	David Brazil	Episode: "Gago"
2016	Ceia Secreta	Presenter	
