= Zezé Motta =

Brazilian actress and singer (born 1944)

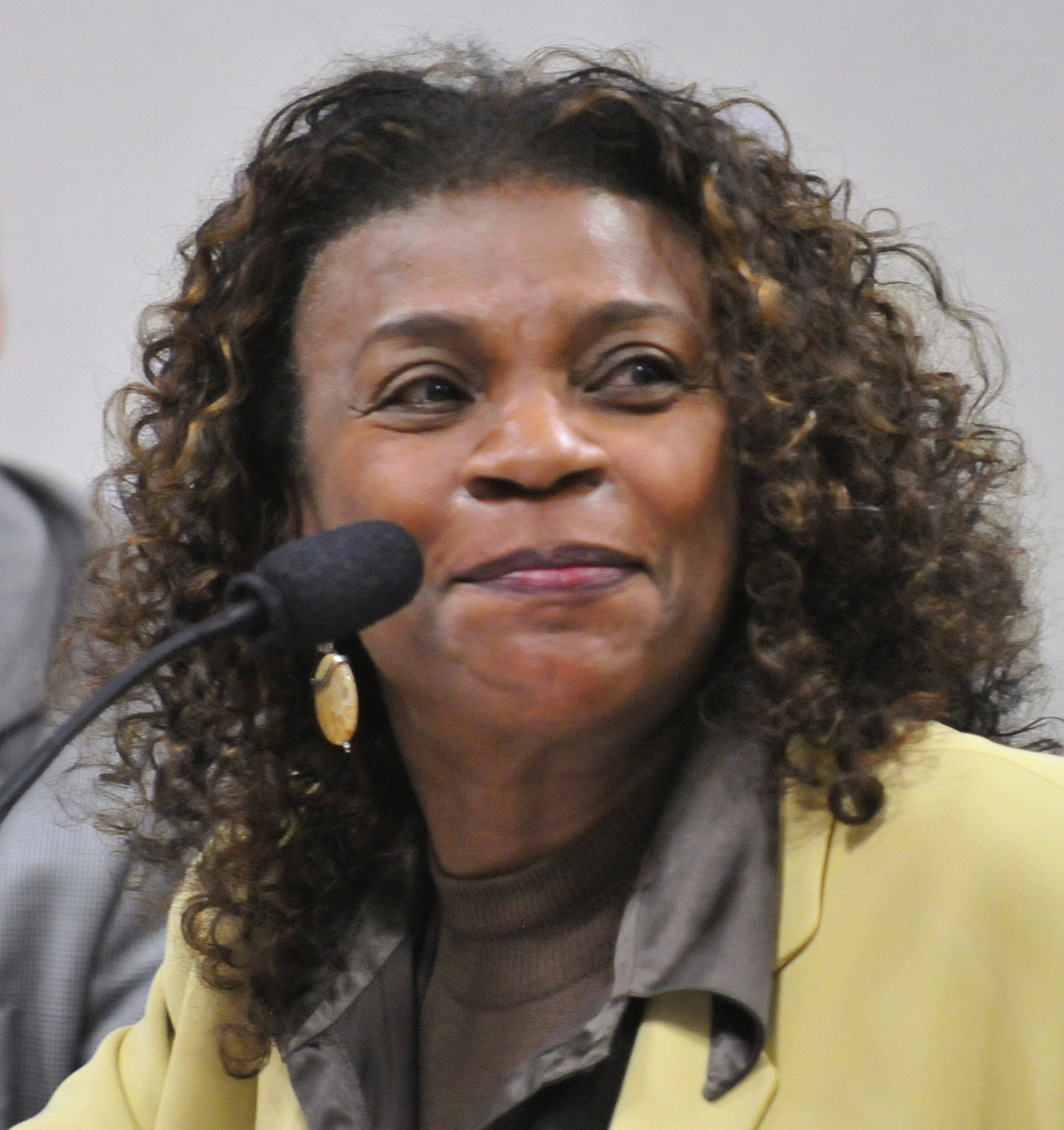
- Motta in August 2011
- Born: Maria José Motta de Oliveira; 27 June 1944 (age 82); Campos dos Goytacazes, Rio de Janeiro, Brazil
- Occupations: Actress, singer
- Years active: 1966–present

Maria José Motta (born 27 June 1944), known as Zezé Motta, is a Brazilian actress and singer. She is considered one of the most important actresses in Brazil.

Motta has received awards, including the Best Actress Award at the Brasília Film Festival, the Air France Award, the Golden Owl Award, and the Governor of the State Award, in addition to nominations for the Grande Otelo and Guarani awards. In 2007, she received the Oscarito Trophy at the Gramado Film Festival, and in 2019 she was awarded an Honorary Grande Otelo for lifetime achievement.

== Early life ==
Motta was born in Usina Barcelos, and later moved to Campos dos Goytacazes, a Brazilian municipality in the state of Rio de Janeiro, in the Southeast region of the country. She moved with his parents and his brother Romilton to Rio de Janeiro at the age of two. His mother worked as a stylist and seamstress, while his father was a musician. The family lived in Morro do Cantagalo for a few years, and soon after moved to the Leblon neighborhood. Due to financial difficulties, Motta spent part of her childhood in a boarding school, the Asylo Espírita João Evangelista, where he learned domestic and manual work. Later, she returned to live with her family in Leblon after their economic situation improved. During her youth, she worked at the Moura Brasil laboratory while studying for an accounting course.

== Career ==
=== Television career ===
She began her television career in 1968 with a role as Zezé in the telenovela Beto Rockfeller, broadcast by Rede Tupi. Four years later, she joined Rede Globo, portraying Zezinha in A Patota. In 1974, she appeared as Doralice in Supermanoela, followed in 1976 by the role of Jandira in Duas Vidas. She concluded the decade by appearing in the series Ciranda Cirandinha, participating in the episodes “The Hanging Gardens of Babylon” and “The Moment of Decision.”

During the 1980s, she acted in the telenovelas Transas e Caretas and Corpo a Corpo, portraying Dorinha and Sônia, respectively. She later appeared in the series Armação Ilimitada, in the episodes “Jararaca, o Cabra” and “Uma Armação nas Estrelas,” and joined the cast of Helena as Malvina. She concluded the decade in 1989, playing Maria in Pacto de Sangue and Lulu Kelly in Kananga do Japão.

In the early 1990s, she starred as an Ialorixá in the miniseries Mãe de Santo and appeared as Zenaide in the episode “Em Nome do Pai” of the interactive program Você Decide.

In 1994, she portrayed Rubina in Memorial de Maria Moura, followed by the role of Fátima in the telenovela A Próxima Vítima the following year. In 1996, she appeared in Xica da Silva as Maria da Silva, the protagonist’s mother. She concluded the decade portraying Conceição in Chiquinha Gonzaga and returned to Você Decide in the episode “E o Circo Chegou.”

In the 2000s, she played Irene in the telenovela Esplendor and appeared in the Portuguese production Garrett, based on the biography of Almeida Garrett. Between 2001 and 2002, she portrayed Mãe Ricardina in Porto dos Milagres and appeared as Mãe Ricardina and Nadir in O Beijo do Vampiro. In 2004, she played the anesthetist Prazeres da Anunciação in Metamorphoses, followed by roles as Titina in Floribella and the enslaved woman Virgínia in the remake of Sinhá Moça. She closed the decade portraying Naná in the miniseries Cinquentinha.

In the early 2010s, she played Dalva (Dadá) in the telenovela Rebelde on TV Record. Two years later, she appeared as Adele in Copa Hotel on GNT, and as Tia Celeste in the miniseries O Canto da Sereia on Globo. In 2014, she played Elaine in the episode “Mãe de Fases” of A Grande Família and appeared as Sebastiana in Boogie Oogie. In 2017, she joined the cast of Escrava Mãe as Tia Joaquina on Record, and appeared in the Portuguese telenovela Ouro Verde as Neném on TVI.

=== Theatre and music ===
Motta trained as an actress from Teatro Tablado and began her professional career in 1967 in Roda Viva, by Chico Buarque de Hollanda. She became active in Brazilian popular and experimental theatre in the late 1960s and 1970s, performing in productions by Augusto Boal such as Arena Canta Zumbi, Godspell, and others like Orfeu.

She also pursued a parallel career as a singer, working as a crooner in the main nightclubs of São Paulo in the 1970s. In 1978, she released her first solo LP titled (Zezé Motta), released by Warner Music. From then on, she released numerous records, performing songs by important composers such as Luiz Melodia, Caetano Veloso, Milton Nascimento, Moraes Moreira, and many others. In addition, her voice immortalized classics such as Senhora Liberdade, a song by Nei Lopes, Wilson Moreira and Zé Renato, Trocando em Miúdos by Chico Buarque and Francis Hime, and Pecado Original by Caetano.

She released more than 10 LPs and CDs, performed representing Brazil at the invitation of the Ministry of Foreign Affairs in Hannover (Germany), Carnegie Hall in New York (USA), Olympia in Paris, and in countries such as Venezuela, Mexico, Chile, Argentina, Angola, and Portugal.

Since then, her singing career has never stopped. Over the last few years, she has toured Brazil performing with the shows “Atendendo a Pedidos”, where she performs hits recorded over her 50-year career, and “Coração Vagabundo – Zezé canta Caetano”, in which she sings a repertoire entirely composed by Caetano Veloso.

=== Film career ===
She made her feature film debut in the early 1970s as a customer at the Viajantes Bar in Cléo e Daniel. In 1973, she appeared in Vai Trabalhar, Vagabundo!, followed in 1974 by roles in Um Varão Entre as Mulheres and Banana Mecânica, in which she portrayed Marilda.

In 1977, Motta played Dandara in Cordão de Ouro, a maid in Ouro Sangrento, and Estrela in A Força do Xangô. That same decade, she starred as the title character in Xica da Silva (1976), directed by Cacá Diegues, a performance that earned her the Best Actress Award at the Brasília Film Festival, as well as the Coruja de Ouro, Air France Award, and the Governor of the State Award. She concluded the 1970s playing Zezé in Tudo Bem and appearing in Se Segura, Malandro!.

During the early 1980s, she portrayed Maria das Graças in Águia na Cabeça and appeared in Para Viver um Grande Amor and Quilombo, the latter as Dandara.

In 1987, she appeared in Sonhos de Menina-Moça as Vicky, Anjos da Noite as Malú, and Jubiabá as Rosenda. The following year, she played Rita in Prisioneiro do Rio and Maria Elisa in Natal da Portela. She closed the decade by voicing Ursula in the Brazilian Portuguese version of Disney’s The Little Mermaid and portraying Dalila in Dias Melhores Virão.

In the 1990s, Motta appeared in O Gato de Botas Extraterrestre and played Crioula in A Serpente. In 1996, she portrayed Carmosina in Tieta do Agreste and, the following year, played Eduarda in O Testamento do Senhor Napumoceno. She concluded the decade portraying the mother of the title character in Orfeu.

In the early 2000s, she played Ada in Chronically Unviable and appeared in the documentary The Denial of Brazil. In 2002, she portrayed Fairy Kálix in Xuxa and the Elves 2 – On the Path of the Fairies and appeared as the woman on the plane in Viva Sapato!. Over the following two years, she starred in the short film Carolina and played Aurora Hipólito in Xuxa and the Treasure of the Lost City. In 2005, she appeared in How Much Is It Worth or Is It by the Kilo?, followed in 2006 by the Lusophone production The Island of Slaves. She concluded the decade with roles in Happy Desert and as Jerusa in Xuxa in The Mystery of Feiurinha.

== Activism ==
Motta is one of the founders of the Unified Black Movement (MNU) and has consistently denounced racism in Brazilian society and media. She has worked to promote the visibility of Black actors and artists and has been recognized for her contributions to racial equality in culture.

She has participated in educational and cultural initiatives, including Telecurso 2000, and frequently engages in public discussions about the representation of Black Brazilians on television and in film.

Zezé Motta founded CIDAN (Brazilian Center for Information and Documentation of the Black Artist) in 1984, after facing racism in the soap opera "Corpo a Corpo". The center was created to combat the invisibility of Black actors, creating a registry to facilitate hiring and promote the professional appreciation of Black artists in the market.

== Personal life ==
Zezé Motta has been married five times and has spoken openly about personal challenges, including multiple miscarriages. She raised four children (Luciana, Cintia, Carla, and Robson), and only in 2020 did she legally adopt them, maintaining her ties with their biological families. She is also the grandmother of Isadora (Luciana's daughter), Safyra (Cintia's daughter), and Gabriel (Robson's son).

She practiced Candomblé, identifying herself as a daughter of Oxum Opará and Oxóssi, and has spoken publicly about her religious journey. She has been involved in almost every religion, being a Jehovah's Witness, a Spiritist, and a Catholic. Today, she defines herself as a devotee who believes in the power of the universe, but without religion.

Zezé Motta has been honored several times at the Rio de Janeiro Carnival and continues to be an active cultural figure. She was honored by Arrastão de Cascadura in the 1989 carnival. The samba school paraded at the Marquês de Sapucaí in Group 1-B (second division) with the theme "Zezé, A Song of Love and Race," celebrating her artistic career. The samba theme song was a major highlight that year.

In 1999, Zezé Motta was again honored, alongside Ruth de Souza, Léa Garcia, and Chica Xavier as the "Black Ladies" of theater and TV at the Sapucaí, by the Lins Imperial samba school parade. The tribute took place in the third division of the Rio carnival (then Group B). Zezé was also the theme of Unidos da Vila Kennedy in Group C of the 2002 Rio Carnival. She paraded on all three occasions.

In 2017, Zezé Motta was honored as the theme of the Acadêmicos do Sossego samba school, a Série A (now Série Ouro) in Rio de Janeiro, with the samba-enredo "Zezé Motta: The Ebony Goddess," celebrating her 50-year career and trajectory in film, theater, and the Black movement.

== Discography ==
1. Gerson Conrad & Zezé Motta (1974) LP/CD
2. Zezé Motta (Prazer, Zezé) (1978) LP/CD
3. Negritude (1979) LP/CD
4. Anunciação / Negritude (1980) Compacto
5. Dengo (1980) LP/CD
6. O Nosso Amor / Três Travestis (1982) Compacto
7. Frágil Força (1984) LP
8. Quarteto Negro (with Paulo Moura, Djalma Correia and Jorge Degas) (1987) LP/CD
9. La Femme Enchantée (1987) DVD
10. A Chave dos Segredos (1995) CD
11. Divina Saudade (2000)
12. E-Collection Sucessos + Raridades (2001) 2 CDs
13. Negra Melodia (2011) CD
14. O Samba Mandou Me Chamar (2018) CD

== Television ==
- 2026 - A Nobreza do Amor - Dona Menina
- 2023 - The End - Dona Neusa
- 2023 - Fuzuê - Rosa Maria dos Santos "Dama de Ouro"
- 2020 - Salve-se Quem Puder - Neusa Ferraz
- 2017 - O Outro Lado do Paraíso - Mãe Quilombo
- 2016/2020 - 3% - Nair
- 2011 - Rebelde - Dalva Alves (Dadá)
- 2009 - Cinquentinha - Janaína (Naná)
- 2007 - Luz do Sol - Odete Lustosa
- 2006 - Sinhá Moça - Virgínia (Bá)
- 2005 - Floribella - Titina
- 2004 - Metamorphoses - Prazeres da Anunciação
- 2002 - O Beijo do Vampiro - Nadir
- 2001 - Porto dos Milagres - Ricardina
- 2000 - Esplendor - Irene
- 2000 - Almeida Garrett - Rosa Lima
- 1999 - Chiquinha Gonzaga - Conceição
- 1998 - Corpo Dourado - Liana
- 1996 - Xica da Silva - Maria da Silva
- 1995 - A Próxima Vítima - Fátima Noronha
- 1994 - Memorial de Maria Moura - Rubina
- 1992 - Você Decide
- 1990 - Mãe de Santo - Ialorixá
- 1989 - Kananga do Japão - Lulu Kelly
- 1989 - Pacto de Sangue - Maria
- 1987 - Helena - Malvina
- 1984 - Corpo a Corpo - Sônia Nascimento Rangel
- 1984 - Transas e Caretas - Dorinha
- 1978 - Ciranda, Cirandinha
- 1976 - Duas Vidas - Jandira
- 1974 - Supermanoela - Doralice
- 1972 - A Patota
- 1968 - Beto Rockfeller - Zezé

== Cinema ==
- 2012 - Gonzaga — de Pai pra Filho
- 2009 - Xuxa em O Mistério de Feiurinha - Jeruza
- 2007 - Deserto Feliz - Dona Vaga
- 2006 - A Ilha dos Escravos - Júlia
- 2006 - Kinshasa Palace
- 2006 - Cobrador: In God We Trust - Secretaría
- 2006 - O Amigo Invisível
- 2005 - Quanto Vale ou É por Quilo?
- 2004 - Xuxa e o Tesouro da Cidade Perdida - Aurora Hipólito
- 2003 - Carolina
- 2003 - Sehnsucht - Miguel's mother
- 2002 - Xuxa e os Duendes 2 - No Caminho das Fadas
- 2002 - Viva Sapato!
- 2000 - Cronicamente Inviável - Ada
- 1999 - Orfeu - Conceição
- 1997 - O Testamento do Senhor Napumoceno - Eduarda
- 1996 - Tieta do Agreste - Carmosina
- 1990 - O Gato de Botas Extraterrestre
- 1989 - The Little Mermaid - Ursula (Voice-over; Brazilian version)
- 1989 - Dias Melhores Virão - Dalila
- 1988 - Mestizo - Cruz Guaregua
- 1988 - Prisoner of Rio - Rita
- 1988 - Natal da Portela - Maria Elisa
- 1987 - Sonhos de Menina Moça
- 1987 - Anjos da Noite - Malu
- 1987 - Jubiabá
- 1984 - Águia na Cabeça
- 1984 - Para Viver um Grande Amor
- 1984 - Quilombo - Dandara
- 1978 - Tudo Bem - Zezé
- 1978 - Se Segura, Malandro!
- 1977 - Cordão de Ouro
- 1977 - Ouro Sangrento
- 1977 - A Força do Xangô
- 1976 - Xica - Xica da Silva
- 1974 - Um Varão Entre as Mulheres
- 1974 - Banana Mecânica
- 1974 - A Rainha Diaba
- 1973 - Vai Trabalhar Vagabundo
- 1970 - Em Cada Coração um Punhal
- 1970 - Cleo e Daniel
