= Danielle Winits =

Brazilian actress

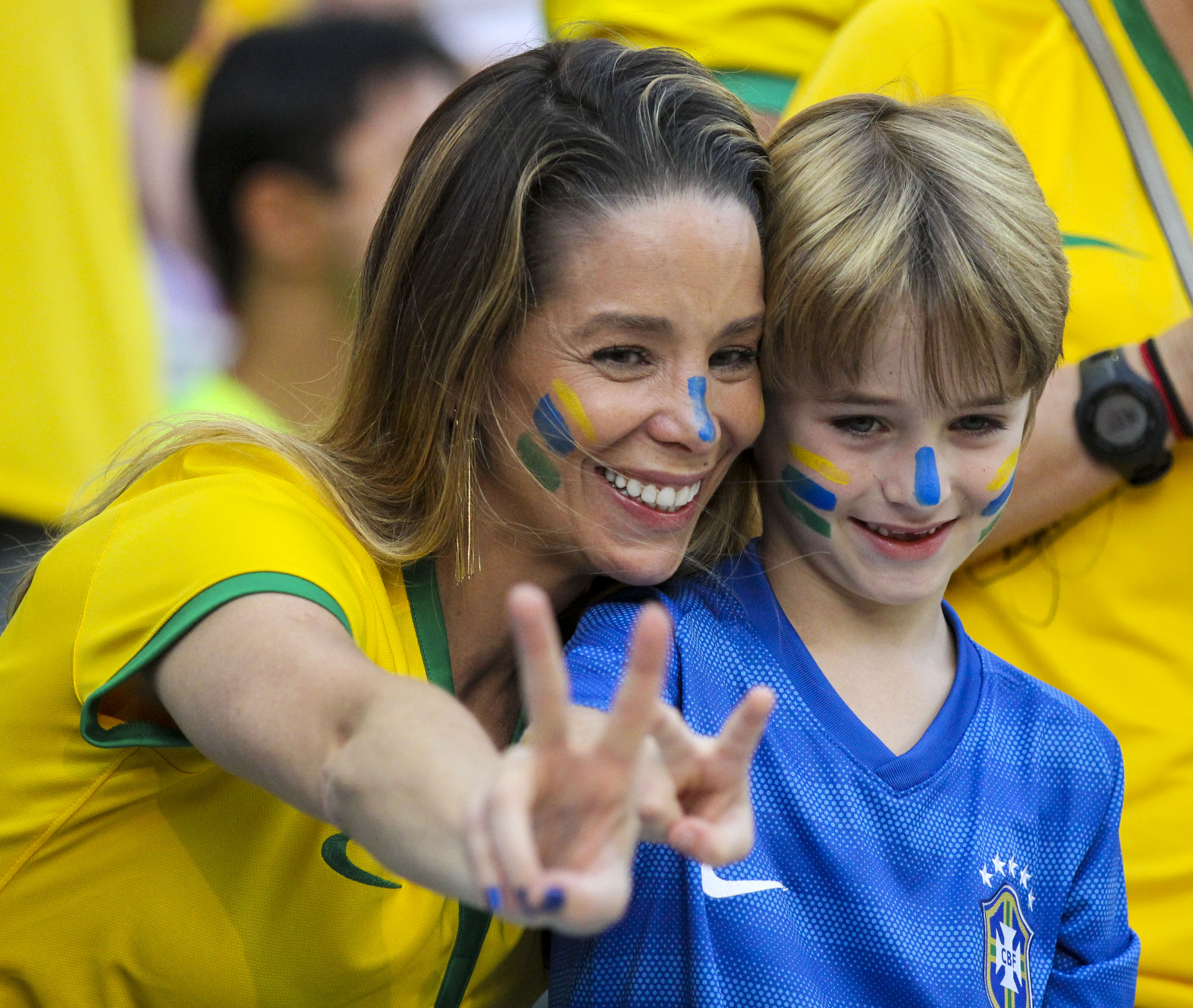
- Winits in 2014
- Born: Danielle Winitskowski de Azevedo; 5 December 1973 (age 52); Rio de Janeiro, Brazil
- Occupation: Actress
- Spouse(s): Cássio Reis (m. 2005; div. 2010) Jonatas Faro (m. 2010; div. 2011)
- Children: 2

Danielle Winitskowski de Azevedo, (born 5 December 1973 in Rio de Janeiro, Brazil), known as Danielle Winits, is a Brazilian actress, dancer, and singer. She has appeared as a regular in several Brazilian TV series and also played the Velma Kelly character in a Brazilian adaptation of the musical Chicago. Danielle Winits has also posed twice for the Brazilian Playboy.

== Biography ==
Danielle took courses in ballet, arts and acting, and became an actress in theatre, cinema and television. In the theater, she has always preferred musicals, where she has excelled as a dancer and singer. She began her television career in 1993, in the Brazilian miniseries, Sex Appeal. Her theatrical debut came the following year in the musical Band-Aid. Her first film role was in 1999 in the film Até que a Vida nos Separe.

=== Personal life ===
Her grandfather, Rubens Vieira Winitskowski, was a member of the 1st Fighter Group of the Brazilian Air Force, sent to fight in Italy in World War II as a third-sergeant, part of the ground support team.

Between 2005 and 2010, she was married to actor and model Cássio Reis. On 19 December 2007, gave birth to their son, her first child, Noah.

On 8 December 2010, she married actor Jonatas Faro. The couple divorced in March 2011 but they had a son, named Guy, born on 28 April 2011.

== Career ==
=== Television ===
Year	Títle	Role
1993	Sex Appeal	Eva
1993	Olho no Olho	Dominique
1995	Cara & Coroa	Diana
1995	A Próxima Vítima	Ana
1995	Malhação	Melissa Brown
1995	Você Decide	(ep. "O Gosto da Vingança")
1996	Ponto a Ponto	Herself
1997	A Justiceira	Marlene
1998	Corpo Dourado	Alicinha
1998	A Turma do Didi	Herself (Christmas TV specials)
1998	Sai de Baixo	Dadá (ep. "Quem Não Odalisca Não Petisca")
1999	Chiquinha Gonzaga	Suzette Fontin (young) / Helena
1999	Zorra Total	Maria Pia
1999	Flora Encantada	Herself
1999	Sai de Baixo	Paty Bole Bole (ep. "A Idade do Bobo")
2000	Uga-Uga	Tati
2001	Sai de Baixo	Gabi (ep. "Um Louro Chamado Desejo")
2001	Os Normais	Luana (ep. "Complicar é Normal")
2001	O Clone	Shirley
2002	O Quinto dos Infernos	Manoela
2002	Sítio do Picapau Amarelo	Drª. Jaqueline / Cuca (ep. "Perigo no Reino das Águas Claras")
2002	Pastores da Noite	Madame Beatriz
2003	Kubanacan	Marisol / Frida
2004	Sob Nova Direção	Francis (ep. "Mulher de Amigo Meu Pra Mim é Um Saco")
2005	A Diarista	Mafalda (ep. "O Casamento do Meu Melhor Figueirinha")
2005	Casseta & Planeta, Urgente!	Herself
2006	Páginas da Vida	Sandra Ribeiro
2007	Minha Nada Mole Vida	Priscila
2008	Guerra e Paz	Bárbara Palermo / Paloma Paz
2009	Sem Noção	Marilinha Braga de Vasconcelos
2009	Superbonita	Presenter
2009	Cinquentinha	Becky Santoro
2010	A Vida Alheia	Manuela
2010	Criança Esperança	Barbie
2012	Malhação	Marcela Porto
2013	Amor à Vida	Amarilys
2024	Família é Tudo	Lizandra Chaves

=== Cinema ===
Year	Títle	Role
1999	Até que a Vida nos Separe	Rosy
1999	Zoando na TV	Lana Love
1999	O Trapalhão e a Luz Azul	Corina
2005	Um Lobisomem na Amazônia	Natasha
2006	Se Eu Fosse Você	Cibelle
2008	Sexo com Amor?	Aline
2009	Os Normais 2 – A Noite Mais Maluca de Todas	Clara
2010	Simbologia de um Crime	Luiza Abrantes
2012	Até Que a Sorte Nos Separe	Jane
2013	Odeio o Dia dos Namorados	Marina

=== Theatre ===
Year	Títle	Role
1994	Band-aid	Rosângela
1996	A volta de Chico Mau	Maria Bela
1998	Cabaret Brazil	Tete Monroe
1999	Relax, it's sex!	various roles
1999	Lancelot	Guinevere
2002	Meu amor. Você é perfeita. Agora muda!	
2005	Amo-te (Você nunca amou alguém tanto assim)	Carol
2005	Chicago	Velma Kelly
2009	Hairspray	Amber von Tussle
2012	Xanadu	Kira/Clio
2025	Meninas Malvadas - O Musical	Sra. Heron/Sra. George/Sra. Norbury
2025	CHOQUE: Procurando Sinais de Vida Inteligente	

=== Awards ===
Year	Títle	Category / Role	Result
2000	Prêmio Qualidade Brasil	Best actress in Uga Uga	Won
2003	Prêmio Conta Mais	Atriz Destaque in Kubanacan	Won
2007	Prêmio Contigo	Best supporting actress in Páginas da Vida	Won
