= Marcos Pasquim =

Brazilian film and television actor

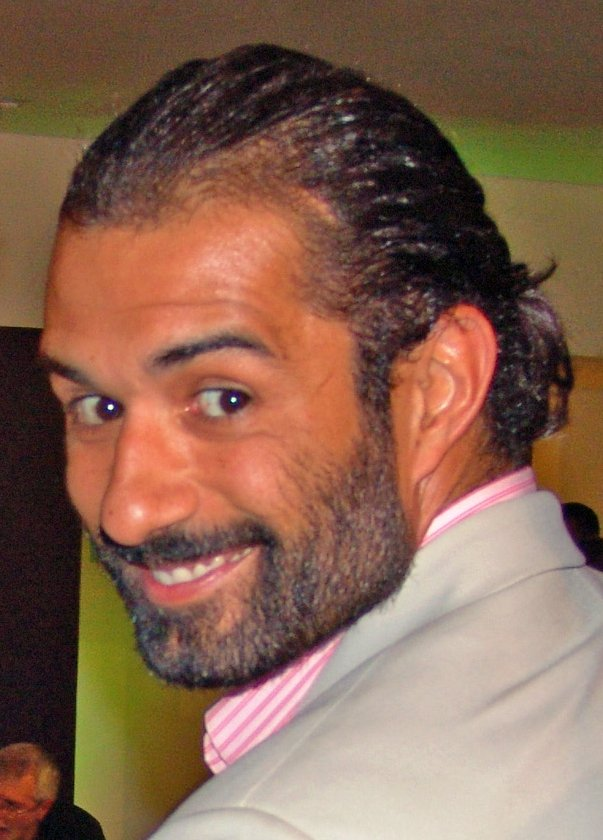
Marcos Pasquim

Marcos Pasquim (born June 14, 1969, in São Paulo) is a Brazilian actor who has appeared on both television and film.

== TV filmography ==
- 2025 - Dona de Mim .... Ricardo Monteiro
- 2023 - The End ... Jairo
- 2012 - Cheias de Charme.... Gilson
- 2011 - Morde & Assopra.... Abner
- 2009 - Caras & Bocas .... Denis
- 2008 - Guerra e Paz .... Pedro Guerra / Tony Tijuana
- 2006 - Pé na Jaca .... Lance (Antônio Carlos Lancelotti)
- 2005 - Bang Bang .... Crazy Jake
- 2005 - A Lua Me Disse .... Tadeu
- 2003 - Kubanacan .... Esteban / Adriano Allende / León
- 2002 - O Quinto dos Infernos (minissérie) .... D. Pedro I
- 2001 - Estrela-Guia .... Edmilson
- 2000 - Uga-Uga .... Van Damme (Casimiro)
- 1998/1999 - Chiquititas .... Filipe Mendes Ayala / Manuel
- 1998 - Brida (supporting role)
- 1997 - Mandacaru .... Eduardo Alencar
- 1997 - Malhação .... Milton
- 1997 - Você Decide ....
- 1995 - Cara & Coroa .... Cosme

== Movies ==
- Bed & Breakfast....Gustavo
- Seus problemas acabaram!.... Himself
- Xuxa e o Tesouro da Cidade Perdida.... Igor
