= Jonatas Faro =

Brazilian actor and singer

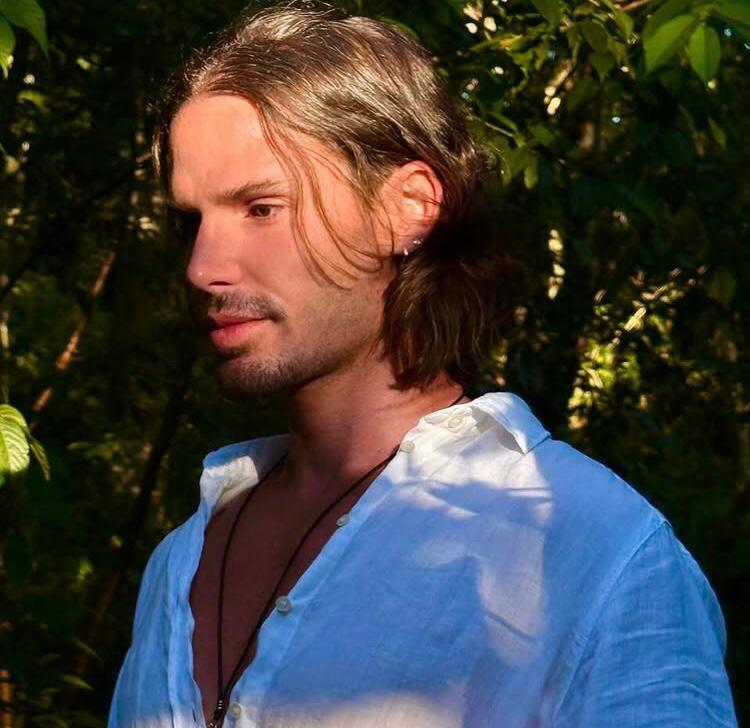
- Born: Jônatas Grassia Faro; August 11, 1987 (age 39); Niterói, Rio de Janeiro, Brazil
- Occupation: Actor
- Years active: 1998–present
- Spouse: Danielle Winits (2010–11)
- Children: 1
- Website: www.jonatasfaro.com.br

Jônatas Grassia Faro (born August 11, 1987) is a Brazilian actor and singer.

== Personal life ==
In April 2010, Faro began dating Danielle Winits after the end of her previous marriage. They married in a civil ceremony on December 8, 2010. The couple announced their separation on March 25, 2011, while Winits was seven months pregnant. Their son, Guy Faro, was born on April 28, 2011.

In October 2026, while competing on A Fazenda 18, Faro revealed that he was in a relationship with a man. His team subsequently confirmed his bisexuality on social media. Metrópoles later identified his boyfriend as economist Paulo Mesquita, a close friend of journalist Glória Maria and a guardian to her daughters, Maria and Laura.

== Filmography ==
=== Television ===
| Year | Title | Role | Notes |
|---|---|---|---|
| 1998–99 | Chiquititas | Samuel (Samuca) | Seasons 2–4 |
| 2001 | Um Anjo Caiu do Céu | Frederico Medeiros Duarte (Kiko) | |
| 2002 | Marisol | Gilberto Soares (Gil) | |
| 2004 | Malhação | Young man interested in Vivi | Episode: "October 19" |
| 2007 | Minha Nada Mole Vida | Breno | Episode: "Onde Foi Parar o Ganso Biscoito?" |
| 2007–09 | Malhação | Valdemar Peralta (Peralta) | Seasons 15–16 |
| 2009 | Dança dos Famosos | Contestant | Season 6 |
| 2011 | Insensato Coração | Rafael Andrade Cortez (Rafa) | |
| 2012 | Cheias de Charme | Conrado Tilman Werneck | |
| 2013 | O Dentista Mascarado | Breno Trambelhini | Episode: "A Placa Implacável" |
| 2014 | Artista Completão | Contestant | Season 1 |
| 2015 | Saltibum | Contestant | Season 2 |
| 2016 | Vai Que Cola | Everton | Episode: "Gay Gayzérrimos" |
| 2017–19 | Apocalipse | Vittorio Solani | |
| 2019 | Jesus | Luke the Evangelist | Episode: "April 22" |
| 2026 | A Fazenda | Contestant | Season 18 |

=== Films ===
| Year | Title | Role |
|---|---|---|
| 2001 | Achados e Perdidos | Short film |
| 2010 | Aparecida: O Milagre | Lucas Resende |
| 2015 | Anjo de Cabelos Longos | Guilherme |

=== Stage ===
| Year | Title | Role |
|---|---|---|
| 1998–99 | Chiquititas – O Show | Samuel (Samuca) |
| 2009–10 | Hairspray Brasil | Link Larkin |
| 2016 | Wicked | Fiyero |

== Discography ==
n November 2014, Faro released his debut extended play (EP) and the music video for "E Mais Ninguém", a song he co-wrote with producer Rique Azevedo.

=== Extended plays (EPs) ===
Lista de álbuns
| Album | Details |
|---|---|
| Jonatas Faro | Release: 18 November 2014; Formats: EP, Music download; Recorder: Sony Music Brasil |

=== Singles ===
| Title | Year | Album |
|---|---|---|
| "E Mais Ninguém" | 2014 | Jonatas Faro |

== Awards and nominations ==
| Year | Award | Category | Work | Result | References |
|---|---|---|---|---|---|
| 2011 | Capricho Awards | Best Nacional Actor | Insensato Coração | Nominated | |
| 2012 | Capricho Awards | Best Nacional Actor | Cheias de Charme | Nominated | |
