= Fernanda Lima =

Brazilian model, and television host

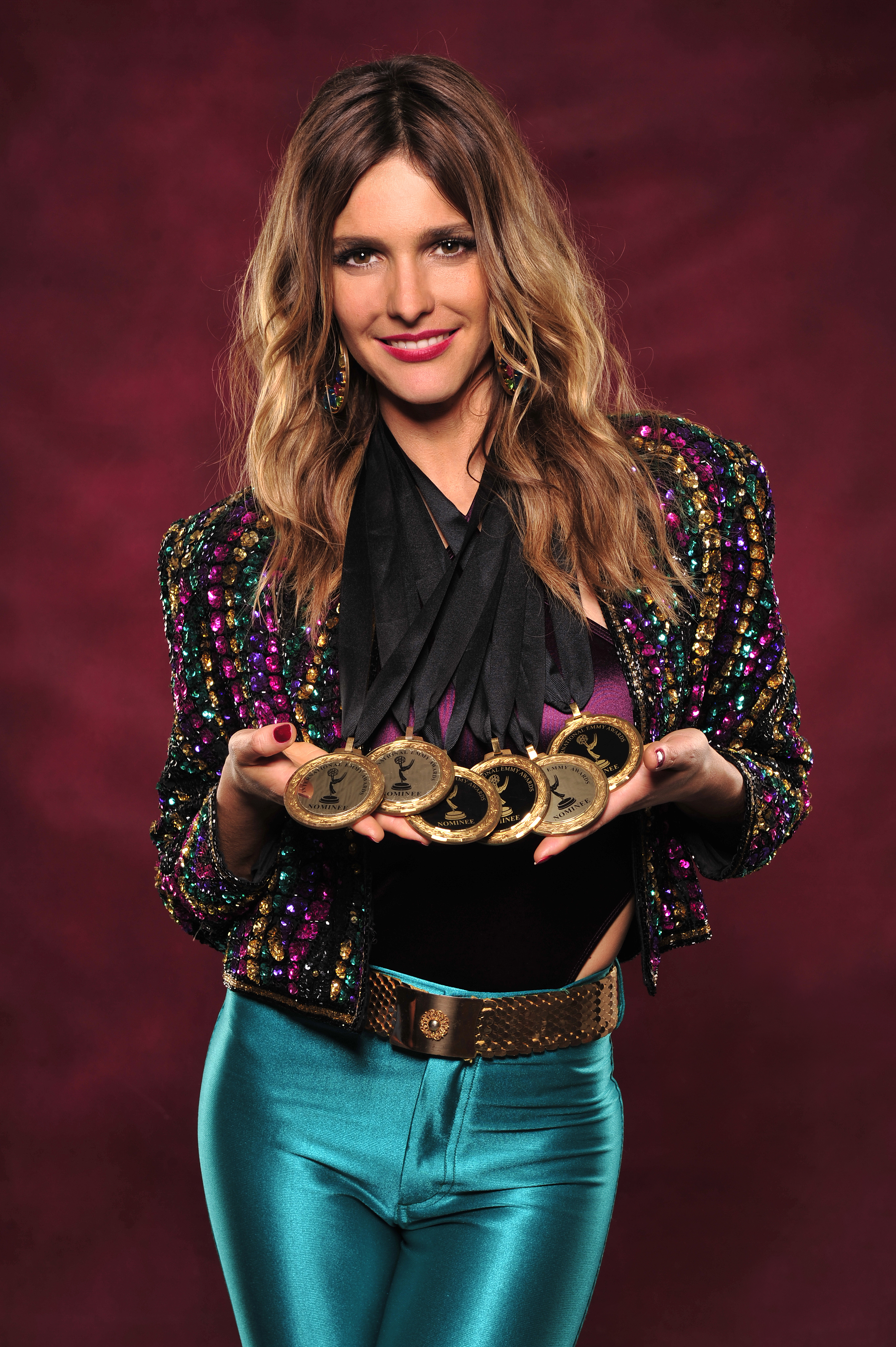
- Lima in 2012
- Born: Fernanda Cama Pereira Lima; 25 June 1977 (age 48); Porto Alegre, Rio Grande do Sul, Brazil
- Occupations: Television presenter; actress; model
- Spouse: Rodrigo Hilbert (m. 2020)
- Children: 3
- Modeling information
- Height: 1.73 m (5 ft 8 in)
- Website: Official website

Fernanda Cama Pereira Lima (Portuguese pronunciation: [feʁˈnɐ̃dɐ ˈkɐ̃mɐ peˈɾejɾɐ ˈlĩmɐ]; born 25 June 1977) is a Brazilian television presenter and model. In spite of a short career in film and telenovelas, she has established herself in popular culture, as a host to a variety of shows on MTV Brasil, Rede TV!, and TV Globo. In 2014, she has been contracted by FIFA to be the muse of the World Cup and of the Ballon d'Or.

== Biography ==
Fernanda Lima was born in Porto Alegre, Rio Grande do Sul. She is of Portuguese and Catalan descent.

One of three children – she has two brothers, Rodrigo and Rafael – of two professors of physical education. As a child, she showed interest in journalism and the art world. She often would create choreographies prepared at parties and family gatherings. She also went to the streets with her cousins carrying cameras to do research on voting at elections, and would edit the recorded material at home.

== Career ==
=== Modeling ===
She began her modeling career at the age 14, when she was discovered by a photographer, and she ended up living for five months in Japan, Milan, and Zurich in 1990 as a teenager. When she returned to in Brazil, she moved to São Paulo. As a model, in Brazil and abroad, she has been photographed for dozens of covers and fashion editorials in publications such as L'Officiel, I-D, Nova, Marie Claire, Elle, GQ, and Trip, among others, and advertising campaigns for the Benetton Group in Italy.

=== Television ===
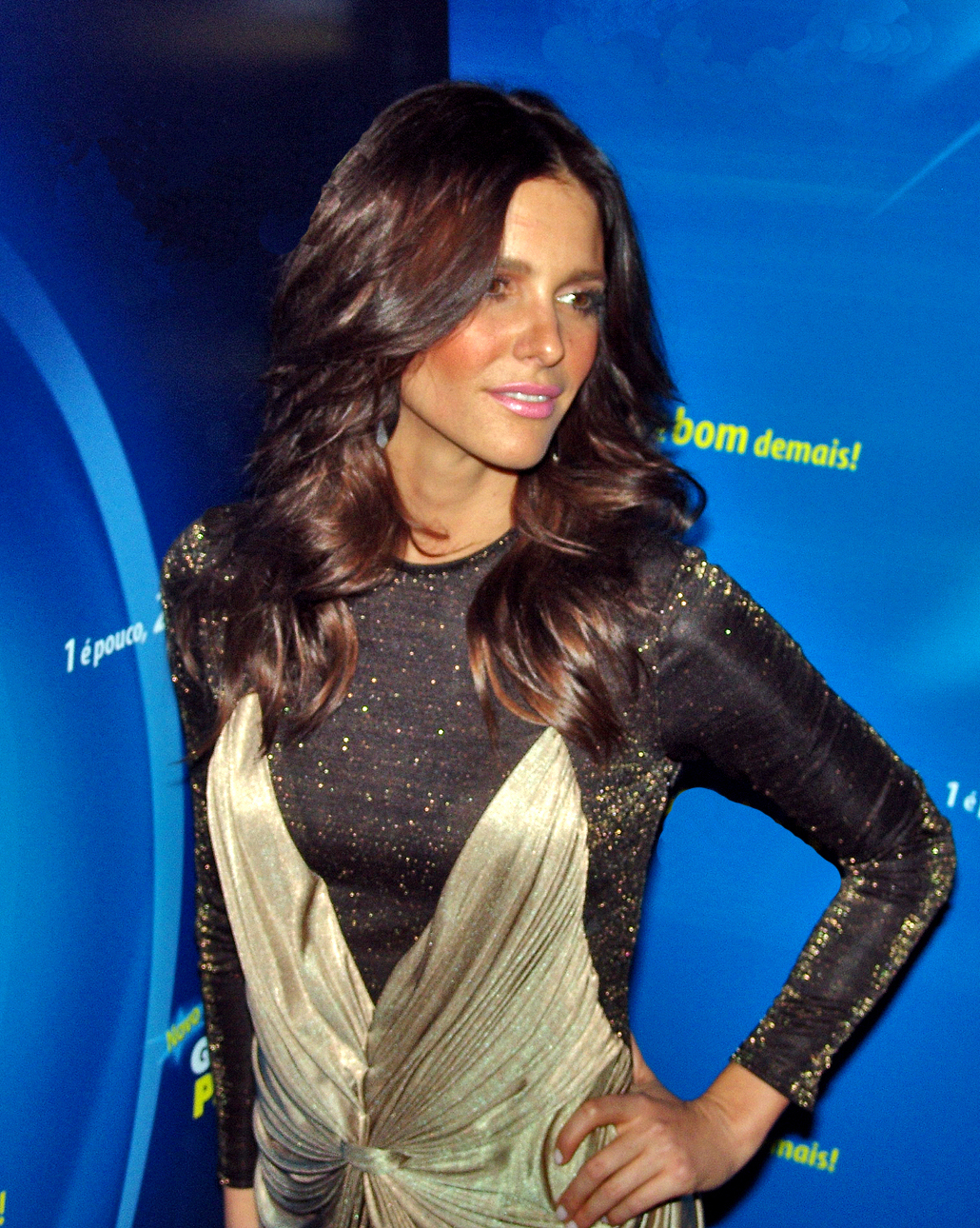
Lima in 2007

In 1999 she made her television debut on MTV Brazil, in Mochilão MTV. While making this programme, she went to Hawaii, it was there where she decided to study Communications and she went back to São Paulo, where she attended and graduated in journalism from Centro Universitário das Faculdades Metropolitanas Unidas. In the same year, she went to work for RedeTV!, debuting in the channel on November presenting two programmes, Interligado, which was aimed at a young audience and conveyed video clips and music and topics of interest to teens, and TV Escolha, a movie session transmitted on Sundays and where viewers chose the films that would be shown.

After nine months in RedeTV!, she was invited to return to her previous channel and, in August 2000, she again presented the Mochilão MTV, Luau MTV, and Fica Comigo, which premiered in October of that year. In February 2005, she was hired by Rede Globo to replace Angélica of Vídeo Game, presenting the programme Vídeo Show, during pregnancy and maternity leave of the titular host. Soon after, she was invited to act in the Bang Bang, set in a plot of city directly reflecting the old west Brazil, where she was the protagonist Diana Bullock. Without any training or experience in drama, she accepted the role, taking lessons in martial arts and hiring a speech therapist. Due to being inexperienced for the lead role, her portrayal of the character received several criticisms from the press, who said she was the cause of the low ratings of the telenovela. In spite of the criticisms, she was invited to play a role in Carlos Lombardi’s film, Pé na Jaca where she played the role of Maria Bo. She got better reviews from the viewers. After this, She got other roles in Fantástico, Daqui para Frente, and Por Toda Minha Vida. In 2009 until 2018, she started presenting Amor e Sexo, a talk show that is directed at a young audience and talks about sexuality and related topics.

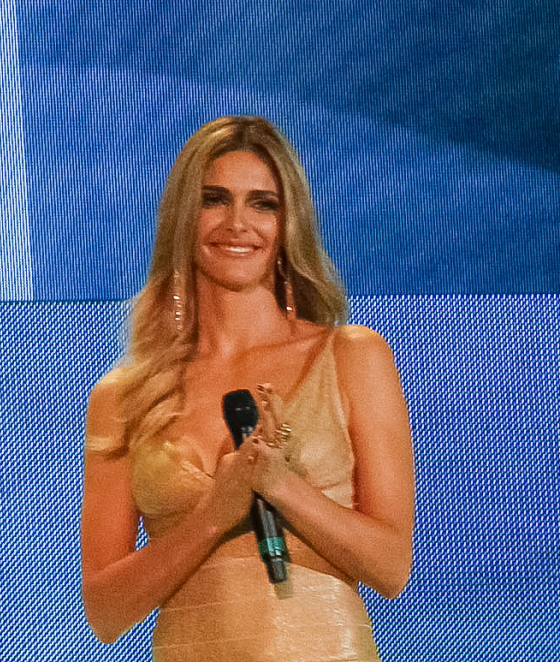
Lima during the draw for the FIFA World Cup 2014

She was contracted by FIFA in July 2010 to present alongside her husband Rodrigo Hilbert during the launching the emblem of the 2014 World Cup in Brazil directly from South Africa. In July 2011, with presenter Tadeu Schmidt, she hosted the draw of the 2014 World Cup Qualifiers. In December 2013, again alongside her husband, she presented the drawing of lots of the World Cup. Her participation in this event was seen live by more than 500 million viewers in 200 countries around the world, Causing her to be called the "goddess" or "muse" of the World Cup by the foreign media.

The neckline of the dress worn by Lima during the presentation of the draw was censored in the live broadcast of the event in Iran, one of the qualified countries of the World Cup. The Iranian media was unhappy with the sexualization of the event, with the TV presenter explaining: “To be honest with you, the dress of the lady who presents the show does not meet our broadcasting guidelines at all.” Casey Stoney, the captain of the England women's team at the time, also thought Lima was the wrong choice for the role. “Giving the job to a model has sent out completely the wrong message,” she said. “Unfortunately I wasn’t surprised. They could have had a woman high up in the game or else a player with proper international standing. This should have been about football.”

At the end of 2013, she was included in a list of 10 Brazilians who stood out in the international news that year, prepared by BBC Brasil. In January 2014, she was the official host of the Ballon d'Or of FIFA for Dutch football player Ruud Gullit. Because of the huge publicity around Lima, she was invited to present an award at the 19th National Television Awards alongside England manager Roy Hodgson.

== Personal life ==
Lima is in a relationship with fellow actor and model Rodrigo Hilbert, whom she met at a luau in Ipanema, Rio de Janeiro and with whom she has twin sons and a girl. She is a fan of Grêmio Football Porto Alegrense, a business partner in a restaurant in São Paulo, a vegetarian, and a practitioner of yoga.

== Filmography ==
Television

Year	Títle	Períod	Channel
1999	Interligado	1999–2000	RedeTV!
2000	Mochilão MTV	2000– 2003	MTV Brasil
2000	Fica Comigo	2000–2003	MTV Brasil
2000	Verão MTV	2000–2003	MTV Brasil
2005	Vídeo Show	2005 – 2007 – 2008	Rede Globo
2006	Por Toda Minha Vida	2006–2011	Rede Globo
2007	Fantástico	2007–2009	Rede Globo
2009	Amor e Sexo	2009–2018	Rede Globo
2014	SuperStar	2014–present	Rede Globo

Telenovelas

Year	Títle	Character
2002	Desejos de Mulher	Ankita
2005	Bang Bang	Ann Diana Bullock Silver
2006	Pé na Jaca	Maria Botelho Maria Bô Bulhões Lancelotti
2008	Beleza Pura	herself
2013	Sangue Bom	herself

Film

Year	Títle	Character
2003	Stuck on You	Susie
2004	Didi quer ser criança	Sandrinha (adult)
2004	A Dona da História	Maria Helena
2004	Cine Gibi	herself
2008	Maria Ninguém	Brigitte Bardot
2009	Flordelis: Basta uma Palavra para Mudar	Bianca
