= Humberto Martins =

Brazilian actor (born 1961)

- Born: Humberto Martins Duarte; 14 April 1961 (age 63); Nova Iguaçu, Rio de Janeiro, Brazil
- Occupation: Actor
- Years active: 1989–present
- Spouses: Ana Lúcia Mansur (divorced) Solange Frazão (m. 1999; div. 2001)
- Children: 3

Humberto Martins Duarte (born 14 April 1961) is a Brazilian actor.

== Filmography ==
=== Television ===
Year	Title	Role	Notes
1989	O Sexo dos Anjos	Otávio	
1990	Rainha da Sucata	Osvaldinho	
1990	Barriga de Aluguel	João dos Santos	
1992	Tereza Batista	Jereba	
1992	Pedra Sobre Pedra	Iago	
1993	Mulheres de Areia	Alaor de Almeida Passos	
1994	A Madona de Cedro	Maneco	Miniseries
1994	Quatro por Quatro	Bruno	
1996	Vira Lata	Lenin	
1998	Corpo Dourado	Chico	
1999	Chiquinha Gonzaga	Arthur	Miniseries
2000	Uga-Uga	Bernardo Baldochi	
2002	O Quinto dos Infernos	Francisco Gomes da Silva	
2002	Sítio do Picapau Amarelo	Long John Silver	Episode: Treasure Island
2002	O Clone	Aurélio Sobreiras	Cameo
2003	Kubanacan	General Carlos Camacho	
2005	América	Laerte Vila Nova	
2006	Sinhá Moça	Feitor Bruno	
2007	Amazônia, de Galvez a Chico Mendes	Augusto	Cameo
2007	Pé na Jaca	Merlim	Cameo
2008	Beleza Pura	Renato Reis	
2009	Caminho das Índias	Ramiro Cadore	
2010	Escrito nas Estrelas	Dr. Ricardo Aguillar/Pedro Cassiano Aguillar	
2011	Lara com Z	Leandro Moraes	
2011	O Astro	Ernesto "Neco" Ramirez de Oliveira	
2012	As Brasileiras	Vitório	
2012	Gabriela	Nacib Achcar Saad	
2014	Em Família	Virgílio Machado	Third phase
2015	Totalmente Demais	Germano	
2019	Verão 90	Herculano	
2022	Travessia	Jorge Luiz Guerra	
