= Amor e Sexo =

- Genre: Talk show
- Created by: Rafael Dragaud
- Written by: Frederico Elboni; Rafael Dragaud
- Directed by: Ricardo Waddington; Daniela Gleiser; Rodrigo Cebrian (2013)
- Presented by: Fernanda Lima
- Opening theme: "Vai com Jeito" - Léo Jaime "Le Freak" - Chic
- Country of origin: Brazil
- Original language: Portuguese
- No. of seasons: 10
- No. of episodes: 90

Production
- Camera setup: Multiple-camera
- Running time: 45 minutes

Original release
- Network: Rede Globo
- Release: August 28, 2009 – 2014

Amor e Sexo (in English: Love and Sex) is a Brazilian television program hosted by Fernanda Lima. Its first episode was aired by Rede Globo on August 28, 2009.

== Format ==
With the presence of a band, live audiences and special guests, Fernanda Lima hosts this weekly show, discussing many issues and taboos - all related to love and sex - in a dynamic and fun way.

== Seasons ==
=== Season 1 (2009) ===
The first season was aired between August 28, 2009 and November 6, 2009, on Fridays, shortly after the Globo Repórter program. In this season 1 were exhibited in total 10 episodes.

=== Season 2 (2011) ===
The second season was aired between February 1, 2011 and March 22, right after the Big Brother Brasil. In this second season were aired in total 8 episodes. The format of series was maintained.

=== Season 3 (2011) ===
The third season was aired from July 7, 2011 to September 1, 2011, this time aired on Thursdays. This season followed the structure of the previous ones.

=== Season 4 (2011) ===
Still in 2011, Amor & Sexo premiered its fourth season, which aired from November 3, 2011 to December 22, 2011, on Thursdays. This time, Fernanda Lima went to Japan, where she performed a series of reports on sexuality and relationship. Leo Jaime went to the streets to complement the material exhibited throughout the eight episodes of the program. The musician interviewed the Brazilians on the same themes discussed by Fernanda Lima, showing a different look on the subject.

=== Season 5 (2012) ===
The fifth season was aired between January 31, 2012 and March 6, 2012, with 6 episodes.

=== Season 6 (2012) ===
The sixth season was aired from September 6, 2012 to October 25, 2012 with 8 episodes. This season presented a new format, inspired by the classic auditorium programs with references in presenters like Chacrinha and Flávio Cavalcanti. The episodes became more thematic, dealing with the stages of a relationship.

=== Season 7 (2013) ===
The seventh season innovated with performances by Fernanda Lima at the openings of Amor e Sexo. In addition to singing, dancing and performing, she also acted as program editor. And the first episode was controversial. After the presenter interpreted the song "Folia no Matagal", by Eduardo Dussek and Luiz Carlos Góes, ten people appeared naked on the stage of the attraction that approached the theme "nudity".

Actors José Loreto, Alexandre Nero, Otaviano Costa, and Mariana Santos, journalist Xico Sá, and couples therapist Regina Navarro Lins continued as judges of the program.

=== Season 8 (2014) ===
The eighth season of Amor e Sexo began with the simulation of a striptease by Fernanda Lima to the sound of "Kiss", interpreted by Leo Jaime. With the theme "Sex Separates from Love," the first episode raised questions about pleasure directly and without guilt.
