= Carlos Vereza =

Brazilian actor (born 1939)

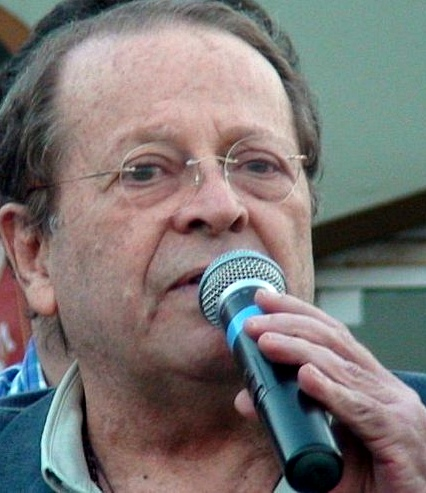
- Carlos Vereza in 2010
- Born: 4 March 1939 (age 87); Rio de Janeiro, Brazil
- Occupation: Actor
- Years active: 1968-present
- Spouse(s): Renata Sorrah (1976-91; divorced); Xuxa Lopes (divorced)
- Children: 1

Carlos Alberto Vereza de Almeida (born 4 March 1939) is a Brazilian actor. He was born in Rio de Janeiro.

== Selected filmography ==
- O Bravo Guerreiro (1968)
- Memoirs of Prison (1984)
- O Rei do Gado (1996)
- Corpo Dourado (1998)
- Midnight (1998)
- O Cravo e a Rosa (2000)
- Sítio do Picapau Amarelo (2001-2002)
- The Three Marias (2002)
- Kubanacan (2003)
- Um Só Coração (2004)
- Começar de Novo (2004)
- Sinhá Moça (2006)
- Duas Caras (2007)
- Bezerra de Menezes: O Diário de um Espírito (2008)
- Amor Eterno Amor (2012)
- Além do Tempo (2015)
