= Xuxa e o Tesouro da Cidade Perdida =

2004 film directed by Moacyr Góes

- Promotional poster
- Directed by: Moacyr Góes
- Written by: Ailton Piui; Flávio de Souza
- Produced by: Diler Trindade; Mônica Muniz; Roberto Talma
- Starring: Xuxa Meneghel; Marcos Pasquim; Juliana Knust; Paulo Vilhena; Sérgio Hondjakoff; Natália Lage; Zezé Motta; Bruna Marquezine; Milton Gonçalves; Sérgio Malheiros
- Cinematography: Ana Schlee
- Edited by: Aruanã Cavalleiro; João Paulo Carvalho; Léli Figueiredo; Rodrigo Lima
- Music by: Ary Sperling
- Production companies: Xuxa Produçoes; Diler & Associados; Globo Filmes; Warner Bros. Pictures
- Distributed by: Warner Bros. Pictures
- Release date: December 17, 2004
- Running time: 105 minutes
- Country: Brazil
- Language: Portuguese
- Budget: R$ 6 million
- Box office: R$ 7.1 million

Xuxa e o Tesouro da Cidade Perdida (transl. Xuxa and the Lost City Treasure) is a 2004 Brazilian fantasy adventure children's film, written by Flávio de Souza, directed by Moacyr Góes, produced by Diler Trindade and distributed by Warner Bros. Pictures and Globo Filmes. Starring Xuxa Meneghel, Marcos Pasquim, Juliana Knust, Paulo Vilhena, Sérgio Hondjakoff, Natália Lage, Zezé Motta, Bruna Marquezine, Milton Gonçalves and Sérgio Malheiros. Xuxa lives a biologist in a town near the Amazon rainforest. Alongside the brothers Riacho and Manhã, she seeks the lost city of Igdrasil, which according to legend was founded by descendants of Vikings who crossed the Atlantic Ocean and ventured down the Amazon River.

Director Góes developed the script based on influences from films such as Indiana Jones Raiders of the Lost Ark, other influences include Allan Quatermain's Lost City of Golds and William Shakespeare's Midsummer Night's Dream. In addition to containing references of Inca and Scandinavian mythology, Brazilian folklore (in the figure of Curupira) and patriotic-environmental pedagogy, used in the territorial defense of the Amazon.

The film debuted on December 17, 2004, in 320 rooms in Brazil. It performed well at the box office, grossing R$7 million reais with more than 1,331,652 million box offices. Tesouro da Cidade Perdida received widespread criticism from critics and audiences.

== Plot ==
Barbara (Xuxa Meneghel), a timid and monosyllabic biologist, lives in Beirada D'Oeste, a fictional city bordering the Amazon rainforest. She leads a group of heroes to Igdrasil, a legendary underground city, populated by descendants of Vikings that crossed the Atlantic and ventured into the Amazon River. Barbara confronts Igor (Marcos Pasquim), her ex-husband, who still holds a torch to her, joined by a pair of siblings on their quest for Igdrasil. A villain steals Igdrasil's sacred treasure. As a token of the encounters and disagreements of the heroes and villains that lead to the lost city and its treasure, there is the Curupira, a magical personage of the Brazilian folklore, that fulfills the functions of Puck, personage of the Nordic folk of the piece A Midsummer Night's Dream, of William Shakespeare, the basis of our plot.

== Cast ==
- Xuxa Meneghel as Bárbara / Deusa Blomma
- Marcos Pasquim as Ígor
- Juliana Knust as Jéssica
- Paulo Vilhena as Lisandro
- Natália Lage as Helena
- Sérgio Hondjakoff as Demétrio
- Zezé Motta as Aurora Hipólito
- Milton Gonçalves as Hélio Hipólito
- Sérgio Malheiros as Thor
- Bruna Marquezine as Manhã
- Peter Brandão as Riacho
- Leandro Hassum as Bunzão
- Márcia Cabrita as Flauta Morena
- Luiz Carlos Tourinho as Curupira
- Rocco Pitanga as Márcio Hipólito
- Marina Ruy Barbosa as Mylla
- John Klarner as Léo
- Glaucio Gomes as dr. Egeu Oberon
- Zé Victor Castiel as Dario
- Kiko Mascarenhas as Bóris
- Alexandra Richter as Dóris
- Arduíno Colassanti as Leader of Wild

== Production ==
After the release of Xuxa Abracadabra, Xuxa started working on the concept of his new film as early as February 2004, the production of the new feature film, would have to go through the choice of Xuxa, began in the first week of the month with casting, although the new film did not have the title defined yet at that time. Once again the direction is of Moacyr Góes, also responsible for the previous film of Xuxa, "Abracadabra". The script is by the playwright, writer and director Flávio de Souza. Souza and Góes became influential in Indiana Jones' Raiders of the Lost Ark to create the concept of the film, other influences include Allan Quatermain's Lost City of Golds and William Shakespeare's Midsummer Night's Dream. In addition to containing references of Inca and Scandinavian mythology, Brazilian folklore (in the figure of Curupira) and patriotic-environmental pedagogy, used in the territorial defense of the Amazon. Xuxa struggles against the clandestine exploitation of biodiversity in the role of a scientist with divine powers. The main message of the film is the defense of biodiversity, with attacks on the covetousness of Americans in relation to the Brazilian Amazon. "The ecological theme is fundamental and is of interest to Xuxa. Today, nothing is as important as the appreciation of the ecosystem," reflects Góes. The name of the fictional underground lost and legendary city of Igdrasil, populated by descendants of Vikings. It was created on the basis of a Norse mythology, which means "Tree of Life". On criticism of his films, Xuxa countered. "If my films are blockbusters because they are seen by a lot of people, then I want to continue doing this. I do not want to make a movie that is praised (for criticism) but nobody wants to review it," says TV hots. According to the producer, Xuxa is silent on the new film for a script option." Xuxa questioned this:"I, who speak so much, will be monosyllabic?...," she said, and she was even a little worried. In a booklet of O Tesouro da Cidade Perdida, the presenter philosophizes on the question: "The message I want to spend in this film is not so expensive, since having a respect for nature is one of the lines I did not have in any dialogue, I want to make it clear that when we respect every living thing, every little animal, every plant, everything in general, we are respecting everything that God has done and gave us the best. "Xuxa has enjoyed this story of being an introverted woman who suddenly discovers that she is a woman, and that she is a very goddess." The scriptwriter has his version: "In "Abracadabra", Xuxa played a character who spoke a lot, this time Barbara is very shy and monosyllabic. Xuxa liked this story of being an introverted woman who suddenly discovers that she is a goddess. The total budget Xuxa e o Tesouro da Cidade Perdida, was R$6 million reais and debuted in 320 rooms in the country. Director Góes (2003) says that although she does not consider herself an actress, he likes her interpretation: "Xuxa has a great presence on screen, lending her characters a lot of authority. Since she does not pretend to be an actress, she puts a lot of her personality into her characters." Actress Natália Lage, who lives Helena in the film, pointed out that children's audiences are seldom targeted by national film productions: "The responsibility for making films of this category is much greater because it is a public in formation," he notes.

To interpret Igor, the love interest of Tesouro da Cidade Perdida, was chosen the actor Marcos Pasquim. Before filming the scene of the kiss, says Xuxa, she asked Pasquim how he would like her to do, how could be the kiss. The actor decided on the famous technical kiss and when he approached Xuxa she said: "Do you smoke?". Unappealing, Pasquim left the scene and came back with a bunch of bullet in his mouth. "The first time was like kissing an ashtray, but then I kissed the actor," Xuxa said. Other actors that participate in the cast are Juliana Knust (Jéssica), Paulo Vilhena (Lisandro), Natália Lage (Helena), Sérgio Hondjakoff (Demétrio), Zezé Motta (Aurora Hipólito), Milton Gonçalves (Hélio Hipólito), Sérgio Malheiros (Thor).

== Release ==
The premiere took place on December 11, 2004, at the SP Market Mall in São Paulo. The film was officially released on December 17, 2004. The DVD and VHS of the movie was released in 2005, and contains Interactive Menu; Selection of scenes; Music video; Making of; Movie trailer; Play Nesquik; Movie set; Video Format: Anamorphic widescreen, Letterbox, Full Screen; Audio: Dolby Digital 5.1 (English); Subtitles: Portuguese, English, Spanish.

== Reception ==
=== Critical reception ===
Xuxa e o Tesouro da Cidade Perdida received low critical acclaim. Mario Fanatic Abadde of the site Omelete gave a bad note to the film, justifying that the script of the film is "weak and insipid" because according to him "tries to put together a handful of images played with perfunctory performances." Perhaps the screenwriter Flávio de Souza, knowing that with this (Juliana Knust), Lisandro (Paulo Vilhena), Helena (Natalia Lage) and Demetrius (Sergio Hondjakof). It's a lesson in how to assassinate a William Shakespeare classic." A Cineclick critic also criticized the script for the film, writing that "it shows a series of ill-explained parallel stories and poorly constructed characters." praising only the participation of the character Curupira, in which he defined as "a Gollum (Lord of the Rings) tupiniquim." Giving a five-star. Jurandir Filho of the site Cinema com Rapadura, criticized the script of the film for being "Very bad! On paper it looks beautiful, but on the screen of the cinema is horrible.It is a mixture of parallel stories without notion and in the end you do not understand anything". For him the script is "extremely childish, can not be charismatic for adults (can not even swallow) and in the end, the older (13 years and above) will realize that it is just another Slot machine, as well as the films of former hit artist Didi. He defined Xuxa's performance as "lousy," and Bruna Marquezine as "pitiful." Writing that the actress "is badly used in this film, as are most of the actors." just praised the performance of actor Sergio Malheiros writing that "he fulfills his role reasonably. Like Milton Gonçalves and Zezé Motta who are there just to give some credibility to the production. Cléber Eduardo of Contra Campo, wrote that Xuxa e o Tesouro da Cidade Perdida "reaffirms and accentuates the heroine's condition of the hots-actress: if in two previous films she saw elves, already sketching a mystical trait of the goodness of her persona, mysticism is promoted to divinity, but without any rupture with reason."

A Cineweb writer, he criticized the influence of William Shakespeare in the script writing that "it suits just for pretext to tell a love story involving the persongaens of the film." Paulo Santos Lima, of IstoÉ, criticized the director of Xuxa e o Tesouro da Cidade Perdida, writing that he "dared, but he did not do it. And whose fragmentation of approaches creates distancing with the public, which he does not even know what it is; the infantile fable of Duendes and Abracadabra and also not sagacious enough for adolescents." he still wrote that "Xuxa is lost between the children's audience and the youth in a plot run by Moacyr Góes." Claudio Szynkier, writing to Folha, criticized the concept of fatherhood set out in the film "full of disappeared, rejected or cretin parents: a dark and strangely symptomatic idea of culture in which there is an authority of the image (in this case, Globo TV) playing paternal role. a system that also provides for the collage of synthetic fragments of a film imaginary: Indiana Jones grafted here, "The Goonies" there, all as fuel structural, fast consumption, for the film floor. The audiences surveyed for AdoroCinema gave the film 4 stars out of five, with a score of 3.8 points. The Filmow site gave an average rating of 1.9 points to Xuxa e o Tesouro da Cidade Perdida.

=== Box office ===
The Xuxa box office forecast and the Xuxa e o Tesouro da Cidade Perdida was to account for between 2 million and 3 million viewers. However, the film reached a lower number than expected with 1,331,652 million box offices, the second most watched national film in the year after Two Sons of Francisco, and the 20th most viewed of the year in Brazil, with a gross of more of 7,108,730.00.

== See also ==
- List of Brazilian films of the 2000s
