= Araponga =

Municipality in Minas Gerais, Brazil

Coordinates: 20°40′01″S 42°31′15″W

- Municipality
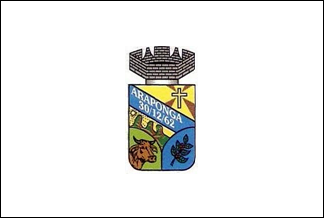
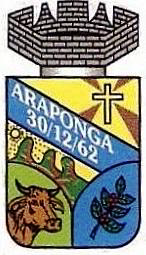
- Flag Coat of arms
- Interactive map of Araponga
- Country: Brazil
- State: Minas Gerais
- Region: Southeast
- Time zone: UTC−3 (BRT)

Location of Araponga within Minas Gerais

Araponga is a municipality in the state of Minas Gerais, Brazil. Its population as of 2020 is estimated to be 8,453 people living in an elevation of 1,040 meters. The area of the municipality is 304.42 km^{2} (117.54 sq mi). The city belongs to the mesoregion of Zona da Mata and to the microregion of Viçosa.

== See also ==
- List of municipalities in Minas Gerais
