= Meu Bem Querer =

- Genre: Telenovela
- Created by: Ricardo Linhares
- Starring: Marília Pêra; José Mayer; Murilo Benício; Alessandra Negrini; Leonardo Brício; Flávia Alessandra; Ângela Vieira; Lília Cabral; Ricardo Petraglia
- Opening theme: "Meu Bem Querer"
- Composer: Djavan
- Country of origin: Brazil
- Original language: Portuguese
- No. of episodes: 179

Production
- Producers: Luís Henrique Rios; João Camargo; Alexandre Avancini; Roberto Naar; Marcos Paulo
- Running time: 50 minutes

Original release
- Network: TV Globo
- Release: August 24, 1998 – January 20, 1999

Meu Bem Querer (My Wishing Well) is a Brazilian telenovela produced and aired by TV Globo. Written by Ricardo Linhares, with the collaboration of Leonor Bassères, Nelson Nadotti, Maria Elisa Berredo and Glória Barretoentre, monitoring text by Aguinaldo Silva, direction of Luís Henrique Rios, João Camargo and Alexandre Avancini, direction general of Roberto Naar and nucleus of Marcos Paulo and transmitted by August 24, 1998 and January 20, 1999, totaling 179 episodes.

== Cast ==
Actor	Character
Murilo Benício	Antônio Mourão Ferreira de Souza
Alessandra Negrini	Rebeca Maciel Mourão
Flávia Alessandra	Lívia Maciel Mourão
Leonardo Bricio	Juliano Mourão Ferreira de Souza
Marília Pêra	Custódia Alves Serrão
José Mayer	Martinho
Ângela Vieira	Ava Gardner Maria Ferreira de Souza
Lília Cabral	Verena Alves Serrão
Arlete Salles	Tonha da Pamonha
Mauro Mendonça	Bilac Maciel
Cláudio Corrêa e Castro	Ovídio
Ricardo Petraglia	Gregory Ferreira de Souza
Ary Fontoura	Neris Ferreira de Souza
Nuno Leal Maia	Inácio Alves Serrão
Rosi Campos	Jorgete
Bia Nunnes	Jacira Ferreira de Souza
Roberto Bomtempo	Cajão
Taís Araújo	Edivânia
Laura Cardoso	Yeda Ferreira de Souza
Osmar Prado	Barnabé Santos
Renata Dutra	Odaísa
Suzana Ribeiro	Selma
Eloísa Mafalda	Delfina
Cosme dos Santos	Zé da Rapadura
Samara Felippo	Baby Amoedo
Mário Frias	Patricio Amoedo
Sérgio Hondjakoff	Daniel Amoedo
Amélia Bittencourt	Ruth
Júlio Braga	Ananias
Bia Montez	Nazaré
Lulu Pavarin	Das Dores
Luka Ribeiro	Zulú (Edivaldo)
Marcos Otávio	Joel
Carolina Abranches	Lara
Carolina Pavanelli	Bisteca
Letícia Medella	Joca
Camila Farias	Ester Maciel Mourão
Helder Agostini	Antônio Maciel Mourão Jr.
Yan Whately	Tico
Samuel Costa	Pingo
