= Sérgio Hondjakoff =

Brazilian actor

- Born: Sérgio Francisco Hondjakoff Mendonça; August 15, 1984 (age 42); New York City, NY, U.S.
- Citizenship: Brazil; United States
- Occupation: Actor
- Years active: 1998–present

Sérgio Francisco Hondjakoff Mendonça (born August 15, 1984) is a Brazilian American actor. He gained prominence for the role of Artur Malta, as 'Cabeção', for 6 seasons in Malhação.

== Career ==
He began his career at age 4, working in commercials and advertising photos. At 7 he participated in Escolinha do Professor Raimundo as Rolando Lero's son. He replaced an actor in the piece República das Saúvas without rehearsing, his debut in the theater world. Like Chumbinho he did Clube da Criança with Mylla Christie on TV Manchete. He recorded a CD for "EMI" in the group Terra Encantada (1997/1998).

He debuted in the cast of Meu Bem Querer as Dã. In 2000, he made 'Artur Malta (Cabeção)', in Malhação, remaining for 6 seasons. Cabeção was considered the most striking character to date in the history of Malhação. In 2009 he signed with Rede Record and starred in the soap opera Bela, a Feia.

In 2013 Hondjakoff worked as a singer. He launched a duo using the name of his well-known character in Malhação, Cabeção & Dino Boyer. The duo released their first work song "Basta tocar o tamborzão" on YouTube. The project shows the actor's humorous side.

In 2014 he worked as a reporter for the Vídeo Show program.

== Personal life ==
In 2017 he began working as a cashier in a New York City restaurant.

== Filmography ==
=== Television ===
Year	Title	Role	Notes
1991	Escolinha do Professor Raimundo	Levando Papo	Son of Rolando Lero
1992	Você Decide		Episode: "Testemunha Ocular"
1993	Contos de Verão	Zezinho	
1993	Clube da Criança	Chumbinho	Stage assistant
1994	Chico Total		Special participation
1995	História de Amor	Pedrinho	
1996	Angel Mix	Rock Hacker	Quadro Os Pentonautas
1998	Meu Bem Querer	Daniel Amoedo (Dã)	
1999	Mulher	Márcio	Episódio: "Mãe Menina"
2000	Malhação	Artur Malta (Cabeção)	Season 07
2001	Malhação	Artur Malta (Cabeção)	Season 08
2002	Malhação	Artur Malta (Cabeção)	Season 09
2003	Malhação	Artur Malta (Cabeção)	Season 10
2004	Malhação	Artur Malta (Cabeção)	Season 11
2005	Malhação	Artur Malta (Cabeção)	Season 12
2005	A Turma do Didi	Sérgio (Serginho)	
2006	Pé na Jaca	Nuno Botelho Noscheze	
2008	Toma Lá, Dá Cá	Larica	Episode: "Uma Epidemia Politicamente Correta"
2008	Casos e Acasos	Pedro	Episode: "A câmera escondida, o porta-"mala" e o chá de fralda"
2009	Bela, a Feia	Maximiliano Palhares (Max)	
2014	Vídeo Show	Himself	Reporter
2015	Pânico na Band	Cabeção	Reporter: "Quadro Fazendo as pazes com a fama"
2018	Impuros	Camarão	Episode 03
2020	Made in Japão	Himself	Season 01

=== Film ===
Year	Title	Role
2004	Um Show de Verão	Marcelo's friend
2004	Xuxa e o Tesouro da Cidade Perdida	Demétrio
2006	Didi – O Caçador de Tesouros	Zeca
2016	Soroche	Chaves
2018	A Repartição do Tempo	Artur Malta (Cabeção)

=== Stage ===
Year	Title	Role
1993	A República Das Saúvas	Beira
	Arraia	Nicolau
	Pedro e o Lobo	Pedro
	Mágica Fábrica de Brinquedos	Desastrado
1994	Anjinhos do barulho	Sabid
1999	Teen Lovers	Alexandre
	Pai, Qual é a Tua?	Bruno
2001	Batendo a Real	Vina
2001	Meninos da Rua Paulo	Csonakus
2002/2003	A bruxinha que era boa	Pedro
2006	Jovem Estudante Procura	Gabriel
2006	Independência	–
