= Kubanacan =

2003 Brazilian telenovela

- Genre: Telenovela
- Created by: Carlos Lombardi
- Written by: Emanoel Jacobina; Margareth Boury; Tiago Santiago; Vinícius Vianna
- Directed by: Wolf Maya; Roberto Talma
- Starring: Marcos Pasquim; Adriana Esteves; Danielle Winits; Vladimir Brichta; Carolina Ferraz; Humberto Martins; Betty Lago; Werner Schünemann
- Opening theme: "Coubanakan" by Ney Matogrosso
- Country of origin: Brazil
- Original language: Portuguese
- No. of episodes: 227

Production
- Camera setup: Multi-camera

Original release
- Network: Globo
- Release: 5 May 2003 – 24 January 2004

Related
- O Beijo do Vampiro; Da Cor do Pecado

Kubanacan is a Brazilian telenovela produced and broadcast by TV Globo. It premiered on 5 May 2003, replacing O Beijo do Vampiro, and ended on 24 January 2004, replaced by Da Cor do Pecado. The telenovela is written by Carlos Lombardi, with the collaboration of Emanoel Jacobina, Margareth Boury, Tiago Santiago, and Vinícius Vianna.

It stars Marcos Pasquim, Adriana Esteves, Danielle Winits, Vladimir Brichta, Carolina Ferraz, Humberto Martins, Betty Lago, and Werner Schünemann.

== Plot ==
The story begins in 1951 in Kubanacan, a small Caribbean island country known as a "banana republic", both for its prime export and its economic problems. After the death of the current president, General Carlos Camacho (Humberto Martins) imposes a coup d'état and establishes a dictatorial regime. In addition, the new ruler marries the wife of her predecessor, Mercedes (Betty Lago), first lady loved by the people for her help to the poor and with whom she had an affair for years. In the village of Santiago, a mysterious man falls from the sky during a storm with a chest shot, being saved by the fishermen and cared for by Marisol (Danielle Winits). Without memory, Esteban (Marcos Pasquim) falls in love with the girl and disputes his heart with her husband, Enrico (Vladimir Brichta), who leaves and lets his ex-wife live with the new love, who takes over her two children. Seven years later, in 1958, Marisol meets Camacho, who convinces her to leave and live as his mistress, claiming she would never get out of poverty in the village.

Esteban believes his wife died on the high seas as a result of third parties and leaves for La Bendita to take revenge, which brings out a double personality, the violent evil character Dark Esteban. In the capital he bumps into Enrico again, now married to Lola (Adriana Esteves), who ironically also falls in love with the amnesiac. Enrico's real lover is Rubi (Carolina Ferraz), Lola's sister, who dreams of joining the army and whom men have never looked for in the absence of vanity, since she dresses like a man and lives dirty for working as a man. In the city the sons of Mercedes still live there - Guillermo (Daniel Del Sarto), who always tries to unmask his stepfather's betrayals, and Mercedita (Tatyane Goulart) a caricature of his mother - besides Camacho's only son, Carlito (Iran Malfitano), who works all night and has several cases, just like his father. He dates the futile Consuelo (Fernanda de Freitas) and is loved by the sweet Soledad (Rafaela Mandelli), who never received a look from the boy for being shy and virginal, but sends him anonymous letters, arousing his passion, which he longs to know.

There is also Dagoberto (Bruno Garcia), the president's secretary who becomes indirectly responsible for government decisions, and Johnny (Daniel Boaventura), a US-raised playboy who becomes Esteban's close friend. Camacho hires Adriano, a Miami attorney who is identical to Esteban and who eventually takes over the presidency, which leads to confusion. In addition, General Alejandro (Werner Schünemann), a former exiled president on the island of La Platina, returns to take revenge on Camacho and destroy the country for good by building Projeto Fênix (Phoenix Project), a nuclear weapon of mass destruction. Throughout the plot it turns out that Esteban is actually called Leon and came from the future to prevent Alejandro's plans. He is the son of the real Esteban, who lives in a cabin near the capital, who got Rubi pregnant without her knowing that he was not the boy she had met. The real Esteban is Adriano's twin brother and the two are Alejandro's sons.

== Cast ==
Some scenes of the serie.

- Marcos Pasquim as Esteban / Adriano Allende / León
- Adriana Esteves as Lola
- Danielle Winits as Marisol
- Vladimir Brichta as Enrico
- Carolina Ferraz as Rubi
- Humberto Martins as Carlos Camacho
- Betty Lago as Mercedes
- Bruno Garcia as Dagoberto
- Daniel Boaventura as Johnny
- Nair Bello as Dolores
- Ângela Vieira as Perla Perón
- Werner Schünemann as Alejandro Rivera
- Marco Ricca as Celso Camacho
- André Mattos as Agustin Tavalera
- Ítalo Rossi as Trujillo
- Lolita Rodrigues as Isabelita
- Mário Gomes as Ferdinando
- Françoise Forton as Concheta
- Mara Manzan as Agatha
- Daniel del Sarto as Guillermo
- Thalma de Freitas as Dalila
- Gero Pestalozzi as Ramon
- Pedro Malta as Gabriel
- Adriano Reys as Pitágoras
- Ana Rosa as Piedad
- Bete Coelho as Cristal
- Marcos Breda as Che Lopez and the captain of the ship who brings Celso Camacho
- Luiz Carlos Tourinho as Everest
- Marilu Bueno as Sodoma
- Ingrid Guimarães as Rosita
- Othon Bastos as Dr. Orthiz
- Thaís de Campos as Lulu
- Otávio Augusto as Hector
- Iran Malfitano as Carlito
- Rafaela Mandelli as Soledad
- Lorena da Silva as Pinita (Ana María Pina Estalva Machado)
- Paula Manga as Catarina
- Stepan Nercessian as Godofredo
- Fernanda de Freitas as Consuelo
- Natália Lage as Frida
- Nadia Rowinsky as Madalena
- Gabriel Braga Nunes as Victor
- Sérgio Loroza as Paulão
- Helena Fernandes as Marieta
- Tatyane Goulart as Mercedita
- Cláudio Corrêa e Castro as Tijon

== Soundtrack ==
=== National ===
Cover: Danielle Winits

1. Carnavalera - Havana Delírio
2. Quizás, Quizás, Quizás - Emmanuel
3. No Me Platiques Más - Cristian
4. Contigo Aprendi - José Feliciano
5. Somente Eu e Você (Moonglow) - Ivete Sangalo
6. Mulher - Sidney Magal
7. Como Um Rio (Cry Me a River) - Vanessa Jackson
8. Capullito de Aleli - Caetano Veloso
9. Mezcla - Rio Salsa
10. Foo Foo - Santana e Patricia Materola
11. Hit the Road Jack - Happening
12. Mambo No. 5 - Tropical Brazilian Band
13. Contigo En La Distancia - Nana Caymmi
14. Eu Só Me Ligo Em Você (I Get a Kick Out Of You) - Elza Soares
15. Coubanakan - Ney Matogrosso
16. Voy Volver - Alpha Beat

=== International ===
Cover: Marcos Pasquim

1. La Puerta - Luis Miguel
2. Fever - Michael Bublé
3. Copacabana - Happening
4. Mambo Italiano - Mambo Project
5. Perfidia - Laura Fygi
6. Tan Solo Tu y Yo (Moonglow) - Ivete Sangalo
7. No Me Platiques Más - Gisela
8. The Look of Love) - Dusty Springfield
9. El Hombre Que Yo Amé (The Man I Love) - Omara Portuondo
10. Laura - Frank Sinatra
11. "Wipe Out" - The Surfaris
12. The Man With The Golden Arm (Delilah Jones) - Billy May
13. Guantánamo - Pablo Gonzales
14. Mambo Caliente - Bahamas
