= Dennis Carvalho =

Brazilian actor and television director (1947–2026)

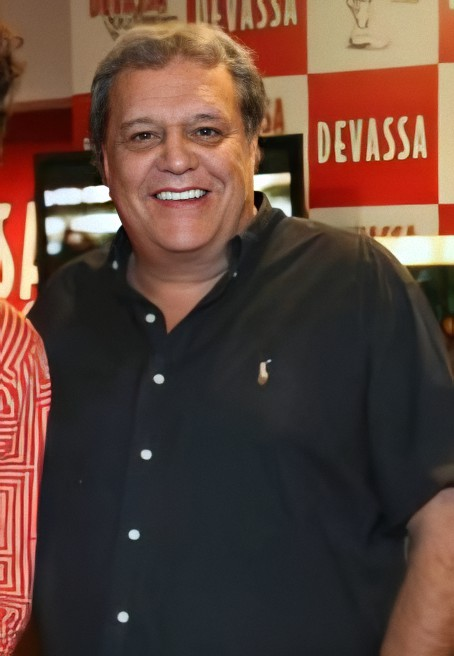
- Born: Dennis de Carvalho; September 27, 1947; São Paulo, Brazil
- Died: February 28, 2026 (aged 78); Rio de Janeiro, Brazil
- Occupations: Television director; Actor; Voice actor
- Years active: 1954–2026
- Spouses: Bete Mendes (m. 1970–1975); Christiane Torloni (m. 1977–1980); Monique Alves (m. 1981–1982); Tássia Camargo (m. 1983–1985); Ângela Figueiredo (m. 1985–1987); Deborah Evelyn (m. 1988–2012)

Dennis de Carvalho (September 27, 1947 – February 28, 2026) was a Brazilian director, actor, and voice actor.

== Early life ==
Born in the Mooca neighborhood of São Paulo, known for its large Italian immigrant population, Dennis was the son of Erasmo de Carvalho and Djanira Lucchesi, both born in Uberaba, in the interior of Minas Gerais. On his mother's side, he was a descendant of Italian immigrants from Tuscany.

== Career ==
Carvalho was only 11 years old when he took his first audition at TV Paulista to participate in the soap opera Oliver Twist. In 1964, he joined TV Tupi and participated in numerous telenovelas. He was then hired by TV Globo, where he built a long career.

As actor, worked in many soap operas like O Meu Pé de Laranja Lima, Ídolo de Pano, Pecado Capital, O Casarão, Brilhante, Brega & Chique, Vale Tudo, História de Amor, among others. He began directing soap operas and series with Sem Lenço, sem Documento in 1977. Among his work behind the camera, notable soap operas include Eu Prometo, Corpo a Corpo, Roda de Fogo, Vale Tudo, Fera Ferida, Explode Coração, Celebridade, and Paraíso Tropical, as well as miniseries such as Anos Rebeldes and Dalva e Herivelto: Uma Canção de Amor, and the series Malu Mulher, Amizade Colorida, and A Justiceira. He was also one of the directors of the highly successful weekly comedy show Sai de Baixo. He was responsible for directing the nine o'clock soap opera Insensato Coração, written by Gilberto Braga (his regular partner) and Ricardo Linhares. In 2013, he directed the seven o'clock soap opera Sangue Bom by Maria Adelaide Amaral and Vincent Villari.

He worked in voice acting, providing the voice of Roger "Race" Bannon in Jonny Quest, Corporal Rusty in Rin Tin Tin, Captain Kirk in Star Trek, and Jerry in The Time Tunnel in Brazilian versions.

After 47 years, he was dismissed from Rede Globo in 2022. In an interview with Veja magazine, he stated that "it is inevitable to feel some resentment" and that he felt it was "hasty" and "unfair." He explained that "Ricardo Waddington, who was my assistant and learned a lot from me, called me into his office and said: 'We're not going to renew your contract, dear. We'd rather call you in for specific jobs, okay?' 'Okay,' I said, and left."

In 2023, he directed the theater show Elis, a musical, about the life of Elis Regina, a play that had already been performed ten years earlier by the director.

In 2025, he returned to Globo to direct a scene for the network's 60th anniversary special. During the broadcast, he directed a comedy sketch featuring famous villains from Brazilian soap operas, including Adriana Esteves, Joana Fomm, Susana Vieira, Flávia Alessandra, Renata Sorrah, Glória Pires, Letícia Colin, Lília Cabral, and actor Cauã Reymond.

== Personal life ==
He was married to actress and politician Bete Mendes, physical education teacher Maria Tereza Schimidt, and actresses Christiane Torloni, Monique Alves, Tássia Camargo, Ângela Figueiredo, and Deborah Evelyn, to whom he was married for 24 years before separating in 2012. He is the father of Leonardo Carvalho, an actor, his son with Christiane, Tainá, Monique's daughter, and Luísa, from his relationship with Deborah. With her help, he overcame serious conflicts, such as the accidental death of his son Guilherme, Leonardo's twin, in 1991, and drug abuse, like cocaine.

In 2010, actor Nilson Gomes recorded a video, posted on YouTube, in which he accuses the director of forcing him to take the "casting couch" and maintain a relationship with him in exchange for a role in his next soap opera. Nilson lost the lawsuit for failing to provide evidence of his accusation.

On December 26, 2022, Dennis Carvalho was admitted to Copa Star Hospital in Copacabana, Rio de Janeiro, after experiencing persistent fatigue initially attributed to stress. Diagnosed with extensive pneumonia that progressed to sepsis, a severe systemic infection, his condition became critical, necessitating intensive care. Carvalho was intubated and placed in an induced coma for approximately 20 days, during which he faced life-threatening complications, including pulmonary embolism and cardiac arrhythmia, requiring a pacemaker implantation. Carvalho was discharged in late January 2023, after over a month of hospitalization, and began recovery at home, focusing on physiotherapy to regain muscle mass and adopting healthier habits, such as quitting smoking and alcohol. Reflecting on the ordeal, he described it as a "second chance" at life, crediting his survival to skilled medical care.

He was Buddhist. He was São Paulo FC fan.

=== Death ===
Carvalho died in Rio de Janeiro on February 28, 2026, at the age of 78.

== Filmography ==
=== Television ===
==== As director ====
Year	Title	Role
1977	Sem Lenço, sem Documento	Director
1978	Te Contei?	Director
1978	Dancin' Days	Director
1979	Malu Mulher	Director
1981	Amizade Colorida	Director
1982	Quem Ama Não Mata	Director
1983	Parabéns pra Você	Director
1983	Eu Prometo	Director
1984	Corpo a Corpo	General director
1986	Selva de Pedra	General director
1986	Roda de Fogo	General director
1987	Globo de Ouro	General director
1988	Vale Tudo	General director
1990	A, E, I, O… Urca	Director
1990	Mico Preto	General director
1991	O Dono do Mundo	Director
1992	Anos Rebeldes	General director
1993	Fera Ferida	General director and head of production
1994	Pátria Minha	General director and head of production
1995	Explode Coração	General director and head of production
1996–2002, 2013	Sai de Baixo	Director
1997	A Justiceira	Director
1998	Labirinto	General director
1999	Andando nas Nuvens	General director and head of production
2000	O Cravo e a Rosa	Head of production
2001	Um Anjo Caiu do Céu	General director and head of production
2002	Desejos de Mulher	General director and head of production
2003	Celebridade	General director and head of production
2004	Como uma Onda	General director and head of production
2006	JK	General director and head of production
2007	Paraíso Tropical	General director and head of production
2008	Três Irmãs	General director and head of production
2010	Dalva e Herivelto: uma Canção de Amor	General director and head of production
2011	Insensato Coração	General director and head of production
2012	Lado a Lado	General director and head of production
2013	Sangue Bom	General director and head of production
2013–2014	Malhação	Head of production
2014	Criança Esperança	Director
2014–2015	Show da Virada	Director
2015	Babilônia	Head of production
2016	Rock Story	Artistic director
2018	Segundo Sol	Artistic director
2025	Show 60 Anos	Director

==== As actor ====
Year	Title	Role	Notes
1954–59	As Aventuras de Rin Tin Tin	Rusty (voice)	Voice dubbing
1964–65	Jonny Quest	Race Bannon (voice)	Voice dubbing
1966	As Aventuras de Eduardinho	Dudu	
1966–67	The Time Tunnel	Jerry (voice)	Voice dubbing
1966–69	Star Trek	Captain Kirk (voice)	Voice dubbing
1967	Os Rebeldes	Plínio	
1968	Antônio Maria	Eduardo Dias Leme	
1969	Nino, o Italianinho	Julinho	
1970	As Bruxas	Zé Luís	
1970	O Meu Pé de Laranja Lima	Henrique Muniz	
1971	Nossa Filha Gabriela	Rodrigo	
1972	Na Idade do Lobo	Flô	
1972	A Revolta dos Anjos	Décio	
1974	Ídolo de Pano	Jean	
1975	Roque Santeiro	Roberto Mathias	(Censored by Military dictatorship in Brazil)
1975	Pecado Capital	Nélio Porto Rico	
1976	O Casarão	Atílio de Souza	
1977	Locomotivas	Netinho	
1978	Ciranda Cirandinha		
1978	Te Contei?	Alex	
1979	Malu Mulher	Pedro Henrique	
1981	Brilhante	Inácio Newman	
1981–1986	Globo de Ouro	Presenter	
1984	Corpo a Corpo	Maurício	
1985	Roque Santeiro	Tomazini	
1987	Brega & Chique	Baltazar	
1988	Vale Tudo	William	
1991	O Dono do Mundo	Rubens	
1993	Sex Appeal	Wálter Moreira Borges	
1993	O Mapa da Mina	Erasmo	
1995	História de Amor	Gomide	
2001	A Grande Família	Himself	Episode: "O Papai Está com a Cachorra"
2001	Um Anjo Caiu do Céu	Jaime	
2002	O Beijo do Vampiro	Count Dracula	
2003	Celebridade	Eduardo Luís	
2004	Programa Novo	Himself	Year-end special
2007	Paraíso Tropical	Senator Luís Fernando Cardoso	Episode: "September 28"
2010	Clandestinos: o Sonho Começou	Himself	
2011	Insensato Coração	Presenter	
2011	Lara com Z	Theater director	
2015	Babilônia	Lauro Petrucceli	Episode: "August 28"

=== Film ===
Year	Title	Role
1970	Elas	Miro
1971	Diabólicos Herdeiros	Benê
1976	Ninguém Segura Essas Mulheres	Aurélio
1982	Beijo na Boca	Artur
1984	Sole nudo	De Bernardis
1984	Espelho de Carne	Álvaro Cardoso
1987	Leila Diniz	Flávio Cavalcanti
2001	A Partilha	Carlos
2006	If I Were You	Arnaldo
