= Gilberto Braga =

Brazilian telenovela writer (1945–2021)

- Born: Gilberto Tumscitz Braga; November 1, 1945; Rio de Janeiro, Brazil
- Died: October 26, 2021 (aged 75); Rio de Janeiro, Brazil
- Occupation: Screenwriter
- Years active: 1972–2015
- Spouse: Edgar Moura Brasil (m. 2014)

Gilberto Tumscitz Braga (November 1, 1945 – October 26, 2021) was a Brazilian screenwriter.

== Biography ==
Braga was born in Rio de Janeiro, on November 1, 1945. He studied at the Instituto de Educação and the Colégio Pedro II. He studied at the Instituto de Educação and the Colégio Pedro II, and attended the College of Letters at the Pontifícia Universidade Católica do Rio de Janeiro and began to work as a teacher at the Aliança Francesa. Later, he worked as a theater and cinema critic in newspaper O Globo.

Braga premiered on Rede Globo as an author in 1972 with an adaptation of The Lady of the Camellias by Alexandre Dumas in Caso Especial starring Glória Menezes. His first telenovela was Corrida do Ouro (1974) writing with Lauro César Muniz and Janete Clair. Created from a newspaper report, the central plot was conducted by five female characters, starring Aracy Balabanian, Sandra Bréa, Renata Sorrah, Maria Luiza Castelli and Célia Biar, who needed to fulfill certain tasks to receive an inheritance.

In 1975, Gilberto Braga worked on adapting the novel Helena by Machado de Assis. Still displayed in black and white, the telenovela aired on TV Globo, the first inspired by a classic of Brazilian literature. In 1975, Braga claimed responsibility for Bravo!, initially written by Janete Clair. The author moved away from the plot to work in Pecado Capital, in replacing Roque Santeiro, censured during the Brazilian military government in his debut.

In October 1976, he wrote his first great success: Escrava Isaura. Adapted from the novel by Bernardo Guimarães, the story was based on the struggle for the liberation of slaves in nineteenth-century Brazil. The novel was a big hit in Brazil. In China, there were great repercussions and Lucélia Santos, who starred in the soap opera, won the Golden Eagle Award for her performance. It was the first time a foreign actress was honored in that country.

In 1977, Braga wrote Dona Xepa, inspired by the homonymous play by Pedro Bloch, starring Yara Cortes.

In 1978, Gilberto Braga wrote one of his biggest hits: Dancin' Days. Created from a theme suggested by Janete Clair, the novela was starring Sônia Braga and Joana Fomm, and brought the fever of discothèques to Brazil. Dancin' Days reached high ratings and became headline in the US magazine Newsweek, in November 1978, which highlighted their influence on fads.

In 1980, he wrote Água Viva alongside Manoel Carlos, starring Raul Cortez, Reginaldo Faria and Betty Faria in the main roles.

The following year, addressing the theme of power and ambition, Braga wrote Brilhante, with the collaboration of Euclydes Marinho and Leonor Bassères, who also collaborated on two novels that the author wrote afterwards: Louco Amor (1983), depicting the love between people from different social class; and Corpo a Corpo (1984), based on the theme of social mobility and revenge.

In 1986, Gilberto Braga began writing the miniseries Anos Dourados, directed by Roberto Talma, starring Malu Mader and Felipe Camargo.

Two years later, Braga wrote alongside Aguinaldo Silva and Leonor Bassères, Vale Tudo, a major milestone in the history of Brazilian teledramaturgy. Through dispute between an honest mother, played by Regina Duarte, and her daughter played by Gloria Pires, the plot addressed the issue of ethical integrity in Brazil, becoming a critical success. In 2002, the soap opera won a remake, displayed for the Hispanic market of the United States. The new version was produced by Telemundo channel.

In 1988, Gilberto Braga wrote another highlight of the Globo programming, miniseries O Primo Basílio, adapted from novel by Eça de Queiroz.

In 1990, he collaborated in the authorship of the telenovela Rainha da Sucata written by Silvio de Abreu. In the same year, he was invited to take care of the musical production of the miniseries A, E, I, O... Urca, by Doc Comparato, and signed the supervision in Lua Cheia de Amor.

In 1991, Braga wrote O Dono do Mundo, the following year, the miniseries Anos Rebeldes. In 1994, he wrote Pátria Minha.

The following year, he wrote Força de um Desejo alongside Alcides Nogueira. Set in the second half of the nineteenth century, the telenovela was the first to address aspects of Bantu culture, of African origin, through the core of the slaves. Força de um Desejo also marked the return of Sonia Braga in Brazilian television.

In 2003, Gilberto Braga wrote another great success: Celebridade, starring Malu Mader, Cláudia Abreu and Fábio Assunção in the lead roles.

Four years later, alongside Ricardo Linhares, Gilberto Braga wrote Paraíso Tropical (2007). Nominated for International Emmy Award, the telenovela had in its main cast Alessandra Negrini, Tony Ramos, Glória Pires, Fábio Assunção, Wagner Moura, among others. From the duo of authors, also came Insensato Coração in 2011.

In 2012, Gilberto oversaw Lado a Lado written by Claudia Lage and João Ximenes Braga, who won an International Emmy.

His last television work was in Babilônia, with Gloria Pires, Adriana Esteves and Camila Pitanga in the main roles.

== Death and legacy ==
Gilberto Braga died on October 26, 2021, at the age of 75, at Copa Star Hospital, in Rio de Janeiro, victim of complications resulting from Alzheimer's disease and a systemic infection resulting from a perforation in the esophagus.

On December 20, 2021, a docuseries following Gilberto Bragas' work titled Gilberto Braga: Meu Nome é Novela was released by Globoplay.

== Filmography ==
- A Dama das Camélias (1979) (TV Movie)
- Praias Desertas (1973) (TV Movie)
- O Preço de Cada Um (1973) (TV Movie)
- Mulher (1974) (TV Movie)
- Feliz na Ilusão (1974) (TV Movie)
- Corrida do Ouro (1974)
- Bravo! (1975)
- Senhora (1975)
- Helena (1975)
- Escrava Isaura (1976)
- Dona Xepa (1977)
- Dancin' Days (1978)
- Fim de Festa (1978) (writer)
- Água Viva (1980)
- Brilhante (1981)
- Louco Amor (1983)
- Corpo a Corpo (1984)
- Anos Dourados (1986)
- Vale Tudo (1988)
- O Primo Basílio (1988)
- Bravo (1989) (writer - 1 episode)
- Lua Cheia de Amor (1990)
- O Dono do Mundo (1991)
- Anos Rebeldes (1992)
- Pátria Minha (1994)
- Labirinto (1998)
- Força de um Desejo (1999)
- Rio, Gosto de Você (2003)
- Celebridade (2003)
- Paraíso Tropical (2007)
- Entre el amor y el deseo (2010) (creator)
- Insensato Coração (2011)
- Lado a Lado (2012) (supervising writer)
- Dancin' Days (2012) (creator)
- Babilônia (2015)
