= Sem Lenço, sem Documento =

Brazilian telenovela by Rede Globo

- Genre: Telenovela
- Created by: Mário Prata
- Directed by: Régis Cardoso; Dennis Carvalho
- Theme music composer: Caetano Veloso
- Opening theme: "Alegria, Alegria"
- Country of origin: Brazil
- Original language: Portuguese
- No. of episodes: 149

Production
- Running time: 40 minutes

Original release
- Network: TV Globo
- Release: 13 September 1977 – 4 March 1978

Related
- Locomotivas; Te Contei?

Sem Lenço, sem Documento is a Brazilian telenovela produced and broadcast by TV Globo. It premiered on 13 September 1977 and ended on 4 March 1978, with a total of 149 episodes. It is the twentieth "novela das sete" to be aired at the timeslot. It is created by Mário Prata and directed by Régis Cardoso with Dennis Carvalho.

== Plot ==
Set in Rio de Janeiro, the soap opera deals with the relationship between maids and employers.

Rosário, the youngest member of the family from Pernambuco, leaves Olinda - because of rumors created by her suitor - and goes to try her luck in Rio. In the city, her three sisters are already working as maids: Cotinha, Das Graças and Dorzinha. United but different from each other, each develops her own story in the plot.

Rosário is impetuous and determined. When she arrives in Rio, she gets a job in the house of her sisters Carla and Berta. Carla is a writer and mannequin, a young woman with feminist ideas who teaches her good manners to behave in the city; Berta, on the other hand, is a naive and dreamy young model. Rosário also meets the complicated Zé Luís, responsible for her removal from Olinda, and with whom she is still in love.

Another prominent character is Marco, a daring advertising executive who is involved in a series of financial problems and has been accused of dishonesty. He is in a failed marriage with the young journalist Yara, from whom he soon separates. As a result, he gets involved and is torn between the love of his sisters Carla and Berta. Marco works with Bilé and Jacques, his best friends and colleagues at Heleno Duran's advertising agency. Bilé is a fumbling but deeply sensitive publicist and playwright who embraces social causes. He meets Carla and gets involved with her, unaware that she is also in love with Marco. Jacques, on the other hand, is an upright and somewhat ambitious professional, doing everything he can to gain a high position in the agency, such as wooing his boss's daughter, Livia.

Cotinha, the eldest of the four sisters from Pernambuco, is a funny and outspoken woman, in love with radio announcer Pérsio Galvão, whose voice and poems are all she knows. She has worked and lived for years in the house of Heleno Duran, a rich and powerful man who owns a renowned advertising agency that is facing a slight financial crisis. He is married to Gilda, an elegant woman who is frustrated at not having been a professional operatic singer, taking part in one or two inexpressive recitals attended only by her husband's family and dependents, and the father of Lívia, an expressive student who lives off traveling and clubbing but, deep down, wants to experience great love. The young woman meets and falls in love with Dinho, a good-luck guy who always lies about his low social status, saying he's the son of a farmer. He lives with his aunt Dirce, a woman who was once very rich, and his friend Patrício, a young civil servant who gets into his messes.

Das Graças, the second oldest, is the only one who is married and the one who houses Rosário, even though she is threatened with eviction. She is married to Olavo, a conservative man with old values, who is unemployed and fearful of being evicted. He pressures Zita, the couple's young daughter, to abandon her dream of becoming an air hostess and look for a job to help support the household. Zita, for her part, is unwilling to comply with her father's wishes, counting on her mother's veiled support. Das Graças is good friends with Berenice, a vivacious woman, a fanatical Flamengo fan and sister of the friendly Tibúrcio, Das Graças' old flame. The three of them work at the home of Nilo and Hilda Sodré. Nilo is an engineer who finds it difficult to get a job because of his age, while Hilda is a witty woman with a strong personality who takes care of the household expenses, selling sweets and snacks outside with the help of the maids. The couple have two children: the legitimate Fernando, known as Nando, a shy student in love with the spoiled Márcia; and the adopted Evandro, determined and hard-working, who at first falls in love with Rosário.

Dorzinha, the third of the Pernambuco sisters, is the most romantic. She loves fotonovelas and often imagines herself as a character in one of them alongside her boyfriend Juvenal, a cheat and liar who wants to pull off a scam that will bring him comfort and financial independence. Juvenal has a parallel relationship with Mabel, a decadent former starlet. He tells them he's on leave, but he doesn't actually have a job. Dorzinha lives and works in the house of Orozimba, Nilo's sister, an extravagant woman, a legacy of her wealthy past. She has a mania for raising cats, covers the furniture with white cloths and keeps one of the rooms locked with padlocks, forbidding anyone to enter. She takes great care of her parents, the fun-loving Eufrásia and the grumpy Adamastor, and is dating Claudio, a sophisticated scammer who poses as a real estate agent.

Dorzinha's great friend and confidant is the gardener Victor, who is in love with his boss Orozimba, who is older than him. Victor is honest and dedicated to his work with flowers, which he loves most after his mother Margarete, known as Margot, an old seamstress who spends hours talking to Eufrásia.

An important character is Henrique. Orozimba's lawyer, he works in an office in the city center with his friend, the quiet Dr. Gouveia, Marco's lawyer. Henrique is a mature man, seductive and in love with Dorzinha, although he doesn't reciprocate until the day he unmasks Juvenal and begins to live a great love affair with the maid.

== Cast ==
Actor	Character
Ana Braga	Maria do Rosário (Rosário)
Ney Latorraca	Marco
Bruna Lombardi	Carla
Ivan Setta	Bilé
Ana Helena Berenger	Berta
Ricardo Blat	Zé Luís
Ilva Niño	Maricota (Cotinha)
Arlete Salles	Maria das Dores (Dorzinha)
Armando Bógus	Dr. Henrique
Jaime Barcellos	Heleno Duran
Marilu Bueno	Gilda Duran
Isabel Ribeiro	Maria das Graças (Das Graças)
Dary Reis	Olavo
Jonas Bloch	Jacques
Kléber Macedo	Orozimba Sodré
Lutero Luiz	Cláudio
Cidinha Milan	Yara
Luiz Orioni	Juvenal
Irma Alvarez	Mabel
Sebastião Vasconcelos	Nilo Sodré
Joana Fomm	Hilda Sodré
Antônio Pedro	Victor
Christiane Torloni	Lívia Duran
Marcelo Picchi	Dinho
Sônia de Paula	Zita
Tião D'Ávila	Patrício
Gracinda Freire	Dirce
Milton Gonçalves	Tibúrcio
Eleonor Bruno	Eufrásia Sodré
Antônio Victor	Adamastor Sodré
Cléa Simões	Berenice
Tony Ferreira	Dr. Gouveia
Ricardo Petraglia	Evandro Sodré
Maria Zilda Bethlem	Sulamita
José de Arimathéa	Pérsio Galvão
Margarida Rey	Margarete (Margot)
Fábio Mássimo	Fernando Sodré (Nando)
Myrian Rios	Márcia

=== Special appearances ===
Ator	Personagem
Augusta Moreira	Tia Filó
Catita Soares	Carminha
Gilberto Nakamo	Dr. Nakamura
Marta Anderson	Marta
Mário Petraglia	Silvério
Rosani Maia	Cleonice
Veluma	Herself, Berta's friend
