= Roda de Fogo =

- Genre: Telenovela
- Created by: Lauro César Muniz
- Directed by: Dennis Carvalho
- Starring: Tarcísio Meira; Bruna Lombardi; Eva Wilma; Cecil Thiré; Renata Sorrah; Felipe Camargo; Isabela Garcia; Osmar Prado; Paulo Goulart; Joana Fomm; Hugo Carvana; Paulo Castelli; Lúcia Veríssimo; Cássio Gabus Mendes; Carlos Kroeber
- Opening theme: "Pra Começar" by Marina Lima
- Country of origin: Brazil
- Original language: Portuguese
- No. of episodes: 179

Production
- Producers: Ricardo Waddington; Paulo Ubiratan
- Running time: 50 minutes

Original release
- Network: TV Globo
- Release: 25 August 1986 – 20 March 1987

Related
- Selva de Pedra; O Outro

Roda de Fogo ("Wheel of Fire") is a Brazilian telenovela produced and broadcast by TV Globo. It premiered on 25 August 1986 and ended on 20 March 1987, with a total of 179 episodes. It's the thirty-sixth "novela das oito" to be aired on the timeslot. It was created by Lauro César Muniz and directed by Dennis Carvalho.

== Cast ==
Actor	Character
Tarcísio Meira	Renato Villar
Bruna Lombardi	Lúcia Brandão
Renata Sorrah	Carolina D`Avila Villar
Cecil Thiré	Mário Liberato
Eva Wilma	Maura Garcez
Paulo Goulart	Juiz Marcos Labanca
Joana Fomm	Thelma Rezende
Osmar Prado	Tabaco
Felipe Camargo	Pedro Garcez
Isabela Garcia	Ana Maria D'Avila
Mário Lago	Antônio Villar
Sílvia Bandeira	Alice
Gilberto Martinho	Gilson Góes
Mayara Magri	Helena D'Avila Villar
Cássio Gabus Mendes	Celso Rezende Júnior
Lúcia Veríssimo	Laís Brandão
Hugo Carvana	Paulo Costa
Yara Côrtes	Joana Garcez
Carlos Kroeber	Werner Benson
Marta Overbeck	Dra. Beatriz
Nelson Dantas	Dr. Moisés Rodrigues
Paulo Castelli	Felipe D'Avila
Cláudia Magno	Vera Santos
Percy Aires	General Hélio D'Avila
Cláudia Alencar	Patativa
Rodolfo Bottino	Gilberto
Ivan Cândido	Anselmo Santos
Jayme Periard	Roberto Labanca
Inês Galvão	Bel
Carla Daniel	Marlene
Carlos Vergueiro	Fernando Brandão
Cláudio Curi	Jacinto Donato
Cristina Sano	Fátima Pires
Beth Berardo	Nazaré
Walter Mattesco	Milton
