= Deborah Evelyn =

Brazilian actress

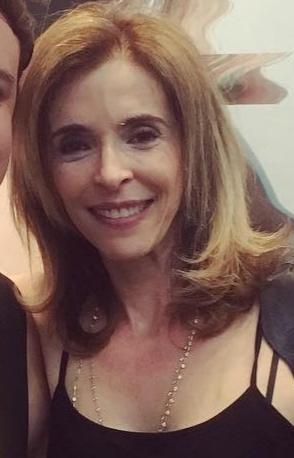
- Evelyn in 2019
- Born: Deborah Sochaczewski Evelyn; 12 March 1966 (age 60); Rio de Janeiro, Brazil
- Occupation: Actress
- Years active: 1983–present
- Spouses: Dennis Carvalho (m. 1988; div. 2012) Detlev Schneider (m. 2014; died 2023)
- Children: 1
- Relatives: Renata Sorrah (aunt)

Deborah Sochaczewski Evelyn (born 12 March 1966) is a Brazilian actress.

== Biography ==
Of Jewish origin, Deborah is the daughter of economist Haroldo Bruce Evelyn and sociologist Suzana Sochaczewski Evelyn, and sister of the actor Carlos Evelyn.

== Career ==
Deborah made her television debut at age 17, in the miniseries Moinhos de Vento, directed by Walter Avancini.

Among her television work can be highlighted the romantic Ruth of Vida Nova (1988/1989) and Lenita Penteado of A Gata Comeu (1985), the naive Raquel of Hipertensão (1986), the bitter Basília of the miniseries A Muralha and neurotic Beatriz Vasconcelos Amorim is Celebridade (2003/2004), by Gilberto Braga. in 2006, Salomé represented in the miniseries JK, everyone in Rede Globo.

Besides the TV, also works in theater and film, taking part in the film Mulheres do Brasil and The Greatest Love of All and O Banquete of the pieces and Deus da Carnificina (the latter on display in Brazil).

She lived her first rival in novels, Judith of Caras & Bocas. In 2011, she played Eunice in Insensato Coração. In 2013, she was cast in the telenovela Sangue Bom.

In 2015, Evelyn was set to portray Inês in Babilônia, but the direction of TV Globo moved her to the cast of the following telenovela, A Regra do Jogo, by João Emanuel Carneiro. In A Regra de Jogo, she portrays Kiki, daughter of a millionaire, that is kidnapped to the control of the own father and that falls in love with his kidnapper.

In 2017, she portrayed Alzira, in the telenovela Tempo de Amar.

== Personal life ==
In 1988, she married television director Dennis Carvalho, with whom she had her only daughter, Luiza, in 1993. After 24 years of marriage, they separated in December 2012.

On April 26, 2014, Deborah married the German architect Detlev Schneider.

== Filmography ==
=== Television ===
Year	Title	Role	Notes
1982	Caso Verdade	Herself	Episode: "Um Engano Mortal"
1983	Moinhos de Vento	Tereza	
1984	Meu Destino é Pecar	Arlete / Netinha	
1985	A Gata Comeu	Lenita Penteado	
1986	Selva de Pedra	Flávia Moreno	
1986	Hipertensão	Raquel	
1987	Mandala	Vera (young)	First phase
1988	Bebê a Bordo	Fânia Favale	
1988	Vida Nova	Ruth	
1990	Delegacia de Mulheres	Fátima de Souza	Episode: "Um Dia a Casa Cai"
1990	Desejo	Alcmena	
1990	Mico Preto	Marisa Menezes Garcia	
1992	Você Decide	Maria Helena	Episode: "O Golpe"
1992	Anos Rebeldes	Sandra	
1993	Fera Ferida	Zigfrida Pestana Weber (Frida)	
1994	Pátria Minha	Bárbara	
1995	Explode Coração	Yone Sampaio	
1996	Você Decide	Dóris	Episode: "Em Nome do Padre"
1996	Você Decide	Ana	Episode: "Bala Perdida"
1997	A Justiceira	Janice	Episode: "Viver por Viver"
1997	Você Decide	Laura	Episode: "A Farsa"
1998	Você Decide	Paula	Episode: "Laura"
1998	Labirinto	Cibele de Almeida Meireles	
1999	Você Decide	Nádia	Episode: "O Califa de Caruaru"
1999	Terra Nostra	Evangelina	Special participation
2000	A Muralha	Basília Olinto Góes	
2001	Um Anjo Caiu do Céu	Virgínia Medeiros	
2001	Sítio do Picapau Amarelo	Astrônoma	Episode: "Viagem ao Céu"
2002	Desejos de Mulher	Fernanda Monteiro Maia	
2002	O Beijo do Vampiro	Laura	Special participation
2003	Celebridade	Beatriz Vasconcellos Amorim	
2004	Sob Nova Direção	Vera	Episode: "Vida de Cachorro"
2004	Começar de Novo	Dora	Episodes: "November 16–24, 2004"
2004	Histórias de Cama & Mesa	Vânia	Special End of Year
2006	JK	Salomé	
2006	Páginas da Vida	Anna Maria Saraiva	
2007	Desejo Proibido	Madalena Borges Mendonça	
2008	Casos e Acasos	Glória	Episode: "O Ultimato, o Vândalo e a Pensão"
2009	Caras & Bocas	Judith Silveira Lontra	
2011	Insensato Coração	Eunice Alencar Machado	
2013	Sangue Bom	Irene Fiori / Rita de Cássia	
2015	A Regra do Jogo	Maria Christina Barroso Stewart (Kiki)	
2017	TOC's de Dalila	Solange Diniz Alcântara	Episode: "Cinderela do Chupa Chupa"
2017	Tempo de Amar	Alzira Torres da Fontoura	
2018	Dança dos Famosos	Contestant	Season 15
2019	A Dona do Pedaço	Lyris Mantovani Aguiar	
2021	Verdades Secretas	Betty	Season 2
2026	Dona Beja	Ceci	
2026	Quem Ama Cuida	Carmen "Carmita"	

=== Film ===
Year	Title	Role	Notes
1988	Mistério no Colégio Brasil	Ludmilla	
1994	Lamarca	Marina	
1997	Amar	Joana	Short film
2001	A Partilha	Herself	
2006	Mulheres do Brasil	Rita	
2006	The Greatest Love of All	Carolina	
2017	Diminuta	Júlia	
