= O Casarão =

- Genre: Telenovela
- Created by: Lauro César Muniz
- Directed by: Daniel Filho
- Starring: Paulo Gracindo; Yara Cortes; Gracindo Júnior; Sandra Barsotti; Oswaldo Loureiro; Miriam Pires
- Opening theme: "O Casarão" by Gal Costa
- Composer: Dori Caymmi
- Country of origin: Brazil
- Original language: Portuguese
- No. of episodes: 168

Production
- Running time: 50 minutes

Original release
- Network: TV Globo
- Release: 7 June – 10 December 1976

O Casarão is a Brazilian telenovela produced and broadcast by TV Globo. It premiered on 7 June 1976 and ended on 10 December 1976, with a total of 168 episodes. It was the seventeenth "novela das oito" to be aired on the timeslot. It is created and written by Lauro César Muniz and directed by Daniel Filho and Jardel Mello.

== Cast ==
=== First period: 1900 ===
- Oswaldo Loureiro - Deodato Leme
- Tony Correia - Jacinto de Sousa
- Ana Maria Grova - Francisca
- Miriam Pires - Olinda Leme
- Edson França - Eugênio Galvão
- Analu Prestes - Maria do Carmo
- Luthero Luiz - Afonso Estradas
- Carlos Duval - Eliseo
- Paulo Gonçalves - Cardoso (Cardosão)
- Hélio Ary - Vigário Felício

=== Second period: 1926-1936 ===
- Gracindo Júnior - João Maciel
- Sandra Barsotti - Carolina Galvão
- Dennis Carvalho - Atílio de Sousa
- Flávio Migliaccio - Coringa
- Ruy Rezende - Abelardo
- Laura Soveral - Francisca
- Ivan Cândido - Valentim
- Juan Daniel - Ramon
- Nestor de Montemar - Gervásio
- Augusto Xavier - Felipe

=== Third period: 1976 ===
- Paulo Gracindo - João Maciel
- Yara Cortes - Carolina Galvão de Sousa
- Mário Lago - Atílio de Sousa
- Paulo José - Jarbas Martins
- Aracy Balabanian - Violeta
- Rosi Campos - Ivete Mendes
- Renata Sorrah - Lina (Carolina Bastos)
- Armando Bogus - Estêvão Bastos
- Marcos Paulo - Eduardo
- Marcelo Picchi - Aldo
- Bete Mendes - Vânia
- Daisy Lúcidi - Alice Lins
- Zilka Salaberry - Mercedes
- Heloísa Helena - Mirtes
- Neuza Amaral - Marisa
- Arlete Salles - Maria Helena
- Elizângela - Mônica
- Ida Gomes - Caterina
- Francisco Milani - Teobaldo
- Tamara Taxman - Virgínia
- Elza Gomes - Ana
- Moacyr Deriquém - Sérgio
- Ruth de Souza - Pilar
- Fernando José - José Resende
- Arthur Costa Filho - Arturo
- Thelma Elita - Conceição
- Fernando Villar - Francisco Bastos
- Maria Cristina Nunes - Teresa
- Waldir Maia - Zenóbio
- Nilson Condé - Father Milton
