= O Dono do Mundo =

Brazilian telenovela

- Genre: Telenovela; Romance; Drama
- Created by: Gilberto Braga
- Directed by: Dennis Carvalho; Ricardo Waddington; Mauro Mendonça Filho; Ivan Zettel
- Starring: Malu Mader; Antônio Fagundes; Glória Pires; Letícia Sabatella; Ângelo Antônio; Fernanda Montenegro; Nathalia Timberg; Stênio Garcia; Paulo Goulart; Daniela Perez; Daniel Dantas; Maria Padilha; Kadu Moliterno; Betty Goffman see more
- Opening theme: Querida by Tom Jobim
- Country of origin: Brazil
- Original language: Portuguese
- No. of episodes: 197

Production
- Production location: Brazil
- Running time: 50 minutes (approx.)

Original release
- Network: TV Globo
- Release: 20 May 1991 – 3 January 1992

Related
- Meu Bem, Meu Mal; Pedra sobre Pedra

O Dono do Mundo (English: The Owner of the World) is a Brazilian telenovela produced and broadcast by TV Globo from May 20, 1991 to January 3, 1992 in 197 episodes.

== Cast ==
Actor/Actress	Character
Antônio Fagundes	Felipe Barreto
Glória Pires	Stella Maciel Barreto
Malu Mader	Márcia
Fernanda Montenegro	Olga Portela
Kadu Moliterno	Rodolfo
Ângelo Antônio	Beija-Flor (Guilherme)
Letícia Sabatella	Taís
Nathália Timberg	Constância Eugênia Barreto
Stênio Garcia	Herculano Maciel
Hugo Carvana	Lucas
Tadeu Aguiar	Walter
Paulo Goulart	Altair Barreto
Paulo Gorgulho	Otávio
Ana Rosa	Nanci
Daniel Dantas	Júlio
Maria Padilha	Karen
Antônio Calloni	William
Odete Lara	Ester
Cláudio Corrêa e Castro	Vicente
Beatriz Lyra	Almerinda
Daniella Perez	Yara Maciel
Marcelo Serrado	Humberto
Susana Ribeiro	Isabel
Alexia Dechamps	Liliane
Maria Helena Pader	Irene
Antônio Grassi	Darci
Betty Gofman	Gilda
Tássia Camargo	Terezinha
Jacqueline Laurence	Zoraide
Jorge Pontual	Xará (Alfredo)
Tuca Andrada	Ladislau
Jonathan Nogueira	Paulinho
Fernanda Young	Jurema
Betty Erthal	Aracy
Nildo Parente	Alceu
Pedro Cardoso	Oscar

== Awards ==
APCA (1991)

- Best actress - Glória Pires
- Best supporting actor - Cláudio Corrêa e Castro

Troféu Imprensa (1991)

- Best telenovela
- Best actress - Fernanda Montenegro
- Best actor - Antônio Fagundes
