= Selva de Pedra =

Selva de Pedra may refer to either of two Brazilian telenovelas produced and aired by Rede Globo:

- Selva de Pedra (1972 TV series)
- Selva de Pedra (1986 TV series)
