= Fera Ferida =

- Genre: Telenovela
- Created by: Aguinaldo Silva; Ricardo Linhares; Ana Maria Moretzsohn
- Directed by: Dennis Carvalho; Marcos Paulo
- Starring: Edson Celulari; Giulia Gam; Lima Duarte; José Wilker; Suzana Vieira; Hugo Carvana; Joana Fomm; Juca de Oliveira; Arlete Salles; Cláudio Marzo; Cássia Kis Magro; Paulo Gorgulho; Cláudia Alencar; Cláudia Ohana; Vera Holtz; Cláudio Fontana; Rubens Caribé; Anna de Aguiar
- Opening theme: "Fera Ferida" by Maria Bethânia
- Country of origin: Brazil
- Original language: Portuguese
- No. of episodes: 210

Production
- Running time: 50 minutes

Original release
- Network: TV Globo
- Release: 15 November 1993 – 16 July 1994

Related
- Renascer; Pátria Minha

Fera Ferida (English: The Injured Beast) is a Brazilian telenovela produced and broadcast by TV Globo. It premiered on 15 November 1993, replacing Renascer and ended on 16 July 1994, with a total of 210 episodes. It's the forty eighth "novela das oito" to be aired on the timeslot. It is created by Aguinaldo Silva, Ricardo Linhares, Ana Maria Moretzsohn and directed by Dennis Carvalho with Marcos Paulo.

The opening song was composed by Erasmo Carlos and Roberto Carlos, recorded by Maria Bethânia, and released on the tribute album As Canções Que Você Fez Pra Mim.

== Cast ==
Actor	Character
Anna de Aguiar	Isolda "Isoldinha" Pestana Weber
Antônio Pompeo	Joaquim dos Anjos
Arlete Salles	Margarida Pestana Weber
Camila Pitanga	Teresinha Fronteira
Cássia Kis Magro	Ilka Maria Tibiriçá
Cláudia Alencar	Perla Menescau (Guiomar)
Cláudia Ohana	Camila
Cláudio Fontana	Áureo Poente Pompílio de Castro
Cláudio Marzo	Orestes Fronteira
Cléa Simões	Cleonice
Clemente Viscaíno	Juca
Deborah Evelyn	Zigfrida "Frida" Pestana Weber
Edson Celulari	Raimundo Flamel / Feliciano Mota da Costa Júnior
Érika Rosa	Clara dos Anjos
Ewerton de Castro	Genival Gusmão
Giulia Gam	Linda Inês Tibiriçá de Souza Maçaranduba da Costa
Giuseppe Oristânio	Maxwell Antenor
Hugo Carvana	Numa Pompílio de Castro
Joana Fomm	Salustiana Maria Tibiriçá de Azevedo Picanço
José Wilker	Demóstenes Maçaranduba da Costa
Juca de Oliveira	Praxedes de Menezes
Julciléa Telles	Ivonete
Lima Duarte	Major Emiliano Cerqueira Bentes (Major Bentes)
Luíza Tomé	Maria dos Remédios
Maria Ceiça	Engrácia dos Anjos
Maria Gladys	Lucineide Barbosa
Maria Helena Dias	Júlia
Marcos Winter	Cassy Jones de Azevedo Picanço
Norton Nascimento	Wotan
Otávio Augusto	Afonso Henriques de Lima Barreto
Paulo Gorgulho	Ataliba Timbó
Pedro Vasconcellos	Etevaldo Praxedes de Menezes
Rubens Caribé	Guilherme Cerqueira Bentes
Susana Vieira	Rubra Rosa Pompílio de Castro
Tonico Pereira	Chico da Tirana
Tuca Andrada	Carlos Barromeu (Delegado Barromeu)
Vera Holtz	Querubina Praxedes de Menezes
Alexandre Barbalho	Montemor
André Gonçalves	Vivaldo Fronteira
Bruno De Luca	Uilsinho
Carolina Dieckmann	Carol
Daniela Faria	Daiana
Fernanda Lobo	Belmira
Fernanda Muniz	Valéria
Isadora Ribeiro	Dona Marquesa
Ivan de Albuquerque	Mestre Nicolau
Lívia Ramos	Consuelo
Luís Antônio Pilar	Antônio
Maria Adelaide Ferreira	Maria da Graça
Murilo Benício	Fabrício
Patrick de Oliveira	Romão Fronteira (Romãozinho)
Raul Labanca	Animal
Rosane Gofman	Vaina Marina
Sonaira D’Avila	Sônia
Waldemar Berditchevski	Laurindo
