= Corpo a Corpo =

1984 Brazilian telenovela

- Genre: Telenovela
- Created by: Gilberto Braga
- Directed by: Dennis Carvalho
- Starring: Débora Duarte; Antônio Fagundes; Glória Menezes; Flávio Galvão; Stênio Garcia; Joana Fomm; Hugo Carvana; Marcos Paulo; Zezé Motta; Malu Mader; Lauro Corona; Caíque Ferreira; Andréa Beltrão; Marcelo Picchi; Lília Cabral; Isabela Garcia
- Opening theme: "Tão Beata, Tão à Toa" by Marina Lima
- Country of origin: Brazil
- Original language: Portuguese
- No. of episodes: 179

Production
- Running time: 50 minutes
- Production company: Central Globo de Produção

Original release
- Network: Rede Globo
- Release: 26 November 1984 – 21 June 1985

Related
- Partido Alto; Roque Santeiro

Corpo a Corpo (Body to Body in English) is a 1984 Brazilian telenovela, aired on TV Globo. It was written by Gilberto Braga and Leonor Brassères.

== Cast ==
- Antônio Fagundes as Osmar
- Gloria Menezes as Teresa
- Débora Duarte as Eloá
- Hugo Carvana as Alfredo
- Joana Fomm as Lúcia
- Marcos Paulo as Cláudio
- Lauro Corona as Rafa
- Malu Mader as Bia
- Dennis Carvalho as Maurício
