= Osmar Prado =

Brazilian actor and writer

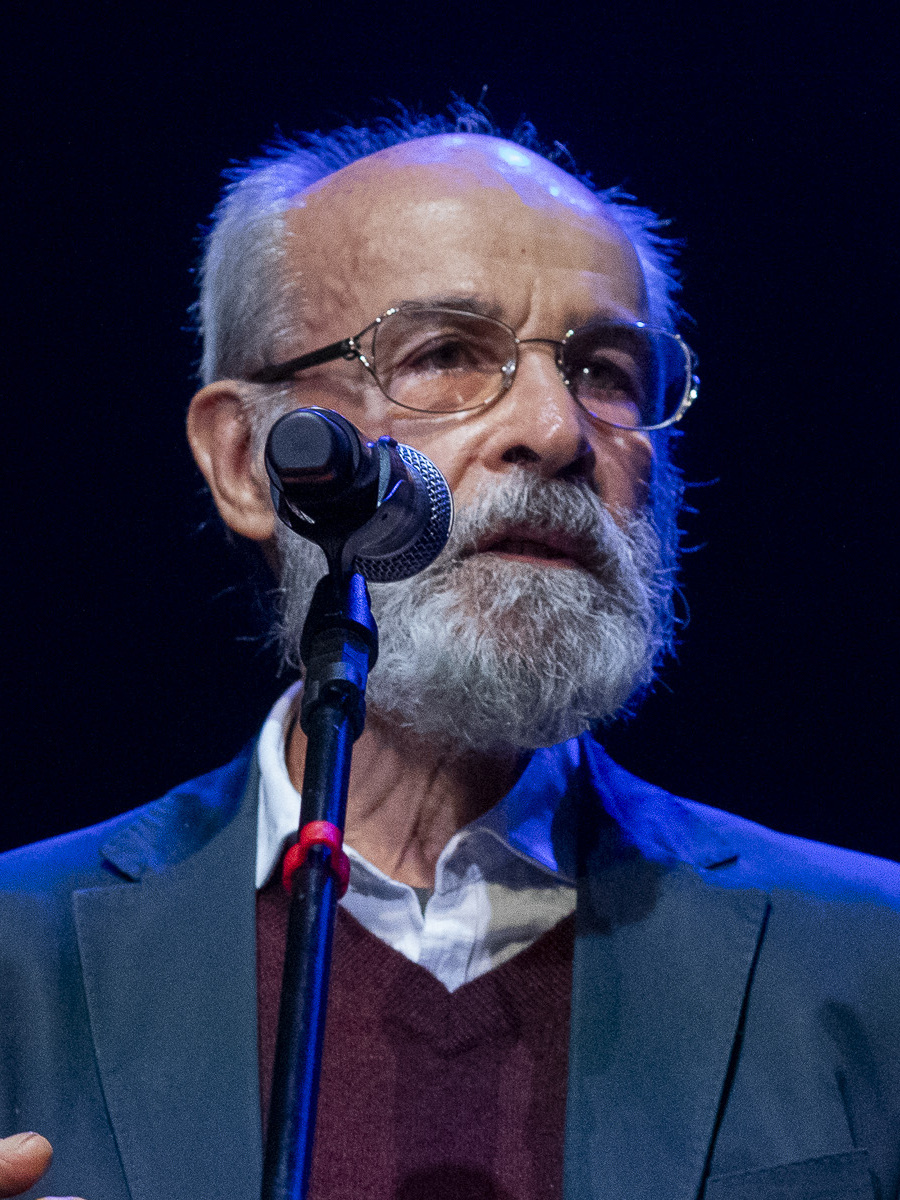
- Born: 18 August 1947 (age 79)
- Occupations: actor; writer; producer

Osmar do Amaral Barbosa OMC (born 18 August 1947), better known as Osmar Prado, is a Brazilian actor, writer and producer. He is considered one of the most prestigious Brazilian actors, having received numerous awards, including three APCA Awards, one Guarani Award, two Qualidade Brasil Awards, one Troféu Imprensa and one Kikito for Best Actor at the Gramado Festival.

== Filmography ==
=== Television ===
Year	Title	Role	Note
1964	Tortura d'Alma		
1965	Ilusões Perdidas		
1968	A Muralha		
1969	Os Estranhos	Tony	
1969	Dez Vidas	Soldado	
1970	Verão Vermelho	Roberto (Bebeto)	
1970	Assim na Terra como no Céu	Mariozinho	
1971	O Cafona	Carlos Monteiro (Cacá)	
1971	Bandeira 2	Mingo	
1972	Bicho do Mato	Lucas Redenção (Juba)	
1972–75	A Grande Família	Lineu Silva Júnior (Juninho)	
1975	Senhora	Torquato Ribeiro	
1975	Helena	Éstacio	
1976	Anjo Mau	Getúlio Ribeiro	
1976	Caso Especial	Albano	Episode: "Quem era Shirley Temple"
1977	Nina	Morungaba	
1978	Te Contei?	Eduardo (Edu)	
1979	Pai Herói	Pedro Varella (Pepo)	
1980	Chega Mais	José Amaro Batista (Amaro) / Ted Lover	
1981	O Amor É Nosso	Alfredo	
1982	Seu Quequé	Seu Quequé	
1982–87	Os Trapalhões	Several characters	
1983	Mário Fofoca	Donato Freitas	
1983	Champagne	Amigo de Nill	Special participation
1983	Voltei pra Você	Joãozito	
1984	Meu Destino É Pecar	Marcelo	
1984	Viver a Vida	Henrique	
1985	Tudo em Cima	Osvaldinho	
1986	Roda de Fogo	Rosário Patané (Tabaco)	
1987	Mandala	Gérson	
1988	O Pagador de Promessas	Padre Eloy	
1988	Tarcísio & Glória	Vavá	Episode: "O Grande Golpe"
1988	Vida Nova	Pietro	
1990	Riacho Doce	Neco de Lourenço	
1992	Pedra sobre Pedra	Sérgio Cabeleira	
1993	Renascer	Sebastião de Pádua (Tião Galinha)	
1993	A Justiça dos Homens	Several characters	
1994	Você Decide	-	Episode: "Cigarra ou Formiga"
1994	Éramos Seis	José Carlos Marcondes de Bueno (Zeca)	
1995	Sangue do Meu Sangue	Clóvis Camargo	
1996–1997	Brava Gente	Ubirajara Ferraiolo (Bira)	
1998	Mulher	Osvaldo	Episode: "A Fome e a Vontade de Comer"
1998	Teleteatro	Several characters	
1998	Meu Bem Querer	Barnabé de Barros	
1999	Você Decide	-	Episode: "Um Outro em Meu Lugar"
1999	Você Decide	-	Episode: "Gol de Placa"
2000	Esplendor	Rodolfo Bernardes	
2000	Você Decide	Leonardo Etelvino (Lorusso)	Episode: "Um Casamento Aberto"
2001	Os Maias	Tomás de Alencar	
2001	O Clone	Alberto Lobato (Lobato)	
2002	Esperança	Jacobino	
2003	Chocolate com Pimenta	Margarido Mariano da Silva	
2005	Hoje é Dia de Maria	Pai	
2005	Hoje é Dia de Maria: Segunda Jornada	Dr. Copélius	
2005	Clara e o Chuveiro do Tempo	Napoleão Bonaparte	Episode: "18 de dezembro"
2006	Sinhá Moça	Coronel José Ferreira, Barão de Araruna	
2007	Amazônia, de Galvez a Chico Mendes	Gianne	
2007	Eterna Magia	Joaquim O'Neill	
2008	Ciranda de Pedra	Cícero Cassini	
2009	Caminho das Índias	Manu Meetha	
2010	Na Forma da Lei	Newton Lopez	Episode: "Debaixo da Pele"
2010	Afinal, o Que Querem as Mulheres?	Dr. Klein / Amâncio Flores	
2011	Amor em Quatro Atos	Marcos	Episode: "Folhetim"
2011	Cordel Encantado	Delegado Altino Batoré (Batoré)	
2012	Amor Eterno Amor	Virgílio de Souza	
2014	Amores Roubados	Roberto Cavalcanti	
2014	Meu Pedacinho de Chão	Coronel Epaminondas Napoleão	
2016	Nada Será Como Antes	Pompeu Azevedo Gomes	
2017	Segredos de Justiça	Adolfo Pimenta	Episode: "Safadinha 22"
2017	Os Trapalhões	Patrão	Episode: "18 de julho"
2018	Ilha de Ferro	João Bravo	
2019	Carcereiros	Carlos Alexandre de Lima e Silva (Cacá)	Episode: "Bens Bloqueados"
2019	Órfãos da Terra	Bóris Fischer	
2022	Pantanal	Joventino Leôncio / Velho do Rio	

=== Cinema ===
Tear	Title	Role	Note
1984	Aguenta, Coração	Ricardo	
1989	O Grande Mentecapto	Barbeca	
1990	Boca de Ouro	Leonardo	
1993	Era Uma Vez no Tibet ....	Monge	
1996	Cassiopéia	Leonardo (Voice)	
2001	A Hora Marcada	Peçanha	
2003	Desmundo	Francisco de Albuquerque	
2004	Olga	Getúlio Vargas	
2011	Tancredo - A Travessia	Getúlio Vargas	Documentary
2012	Amores Passageiros	Sr. Benites	Short film
2018	10 Segundos para Vencer	Kid Jofre	
