= Brilhante (TV series) =

- Genre: Telenovela
- Created by: Gilberto Braga
- Directed by: Daniel Filho
- Starring: Vera Fischer; Tarcísio Meira; Fernanda Montenegro; Renée de Vielmond; José Wilker; Dennis Carvalho; Renata Sorrah; Cláudio Marzo; Mário Lago; Jardel Filho; Joana Fomm
- Opening theme: "Luiza" by Tom Jobim
- Country of origin: Brazil
- Original language: Portuguese
- No. of episodes: 155

Production
- Running time: 50 minutes

Original release
- Network: TV Globo
- Release: 28 September 1981 – 26 March 1982

Related
- Baila Comigo; Sétimo Sentido

Brilhante is a Brazilian telenovela produced and broadcast by TV Globo. It premiered on 28 September 1981 and ended on 26 March 1982, with a total of 155 episodes. It's the twenty seventh "novela das oito" to be aired on the timeslot. It is created and written by Gilberto Braga and directed by Daniel Filho.

== Cast ==
Actor	Character
Vera Fischer	Luiza Sampaio
Tarcísio Meira	Paulo César Carvalho
José Wilker	Sidney Ribeiro/Osvaldo Mesquita
Fernanda Montenegro	Francisca (Chica) Newman
Dennis Carvalho	Inácio Newman
Renée de Vielmond	Maria Isabel Newman Carvalho
Renata Sorrah	Leonor Negreiros Newman
Jardel Filho	Bruno Newman
Cláudio Marzo	Carlos Andrade
Joana Fomm	Vírginia Sampaio
Kadu Moliterno	Afonso Negreiros
Nádia Lippi	Vânia Cardoso
Laura Cardoso	Alda Sampaio
Mário Lago	Vítor Newmann
Eloísa Mafalda	Edith Negreiros
Sérgio Mamberti	Galeno Sampaio
Célia Helena	Regina Newman
Buza Ferraz	Cláudio
Suzana Faini	Renée Toledo Sampaio
Rodolfo Mayer	Ernani Sampaio
Oswaldo Louzada	Leonel Toledo
Rosita Thomaz Lopes	Leticia Cardoso
Lídia Mattos	Nilza
Eduardo Conde	Edvaldo
Renato Pedrosa	Ulisses
Graziela Di Laurentis	Heloísa
Rômulo Arantes	Osmar
Maria Gladys	Dinalva
Márcia Rodrigues	Yara
Janser Barreto	Lino
Carla Camurati	Sônia Newmann
Caíque Ferreira	Fred (Frederico Toledo Sampaio)
Fábio Villa Verde	Silvio
Anselmo Vasconcelos	Detetive Tavares
Fernanda Torres	Marília Newmann Carvalho
Beatriz Lyra	Carmen
