= Show 60 Anos =

Special program commemorating 60th anniversary of TV Globo

- Genre: Television special
- Directed by: Antonia Prado; Monica Almeida
- Starring: Ivete Sangalo; Gilberto Gil; Adriana Esteves; Joana Fomm; Susana Vieira; Flávia Alessandra; Renata Sorrah; Gloria Pires; Letícia Colin; Lilia Cabral; Miguel Falabella; Marisa Orth; Antonio Fagundes; Stênio Garcia
- Country of origin: Brazil
- Original language: Portuguese

Production
- Production locations: Estúdios Globo, Rio de Janeiro (pre-recorded segments); Farmasi Arena, Rio de Janeiro (live segments)
- Production company: Estúdios Globo

Original release
- Network: TV Globo
- Release: 26 April 2025

Show 60 Anos (Note: (English: Show 60 Years)) is a Brazilian television special by TV Globo that aired on 28 April 2025. The event celebrated the network's 60th anniversary and the 100th anniversary of Grupo Globo, bringing together a star-studded cast, musical personalities, and notable moments in the history of Brazilian television.

== Background ==
For 60th anniversary celebration, TV Globo had a special program lasted for 60 hours, including several commemorative programs in addition to the traditional special show. The special marathon program featured:

- Vídeo Show - Especial: Under the direction of Dani Gleiser, the program returned in a special edition, kick-off the 60-hour celebration marathon. The presentation featured a reunion of former presenters such as Miguel Falabella, Cissa Guimarães, André Marques, Angélica, Otaviano Costa, Monica Iozzi and Joaquim Lopes.
- Globo Repórter: Presented by Sandra Annenberg, the news program aired a special edition dedicated to the broadcaster's 60th anniversary, exploring its timeline and presenting behind-the-scenes stories, as well as the challenges that shaped TV Globo over the decades.
- Vídeo Game - Especial: Initially scheduled to air as part of the Vídeo Show special on 25 April 2025, the program ended up getting its own edition and was shown as an standalone show on 26 April in the afternoon slot. The special edition featured the appearance of Xuxa and Fábio Porchat as guests in the game.
- Glória: The career of journalist Glória Maria, who died in 2023, was the subject of a documentary. Divided into four episodes, the series recalled key moments in the reporter's career and featured testimonies from personalities such as Pedro Bial, Fátima Bernardes, Maju Coutinho, Djavan, Mano Brown, Emicida and Maria Bethânia.
- Regular programs, such as É de Casa, Altas Horas, Domingão com Huck and Caldeirão com Mion, also received special anniversary editions, recalling historical moments and bringing special guests to commemorate 60 years of TV Globo.

== Concept ==
Show 60 Anos will be a large-scale spectacle that will feature more than 400 talents, including musicians, actors and personalities who have left their mark on the network's history. The event promises:

- Notable musical numbers, with performances by Brazilian artists.
- Unprecedented encounters between talents and characters that marked the network's telenovela.
- Revival of notable scenes from TV Globo, including moments from soap operas and comedy shows.
- Unreleased segments, bringing content previously never shown to the public.

A celebration of the unity, emotion and evolution of Brazilian television, paying tribute to professionals and the audience who were part of TV Globo's history.

== Production ==
The artistic direction was in charge of Antonia Prado, while Monica Almeida took on the genre direction. The set design was signed by Nathan Paul Taylor, who had worked with celebrities such as Bruno Mars, Maroon 5, John Mayer and One Direction.

The show is a combination of live performances and pre-recorded segments at Estúdios Globo and Farmasi Arena in Rio de Janeiro.

== Impact ==
=== Audience rating ===
The show achieved 15.6 points even though it was shown from 10:25 p.m. to 12:57 a.m. Brasilia Time, according to consolidated data from Kantar IBOPE Media in Greater São Paulo, becoming one of the highest ratings for the show lineup on a Monday since the showing of the film Time on Tela Quente.

=== Reviews ===
The special received several compliments from the public for the presentations and appearances of historical names of the network, with the Encontro de Vilãs being the most anticipated moment of the show, mainly due to the appearance of Carminha (Adriana Esteves) that even made the audience at Farmasi Arena got thrilled.
