= Magnifica 70 =

- Genre: Drama
- Created by: Cláudio Torres; Renato Fagundes; Leandro Assis; Luiz Noronha
- Written by: Cláudio Torres; Renato Fagundes; Leandro Assis
- Directed by: Cláudio Torres
- Starring: Marcos Winter; Simone Spoladore; Adriano Garib; Maria Luísa Mendonça; Stepan Nercessian; Juliana Galdino; Pierre Baitelli; André Frateschi; Julia Ianina; Rodrigo Fregnan; Leandro Firmino; Paulo César Pereio; Joana Fomm
- Opening theme: Sangue Latino by Secos e Molhados
- Country of origin: Brazil
- Original language: Portuguese
- No. of seasons: 3
- No. of episodes: 33

Production
- Producers: Luis F. Peraza; Roberto Rios; Maria Angela de Jesus
- Camera setup: Multi-camera
- Running time: 50-60 minutes
- Production companies: Conspiração Filmes; HBO Latin America Originals

Original release
- Network: HBO Brasil
- Release: 24 April 2015 – 16 December 2018

Magnifica 70 is a 2015 Brazilian television drama aired on HBO Brasil, that ran for three series from 2015 to 2018.

Set in 1970s Brazil, "a staid erotica censor falls in love with a film star, who reminds him of an obsessive love from the past"; that love was his wife's sister, who had a mind twisted by her father.

== Cast ==
- Marcos Winter as Vicente
- Simone Spoladore as Dora Dumar
- Adriano Garib as Manolo
- Maria Luísa Mendonça as Isabel Souto
- Paulo César Peréio as General Souto
- Leandro Firmino as Carioca
- Stepan Nercessian as Larsen
- Joana Fomm as Lúcia Souto
- Vinícius de Oliveira as Saulo
- Cristina Lago as Bianca
- Maria Zilda Bethlem as Madre
- Mariana Lima as Marina
- Tammy Di Calafiori as Melissa
- Pietro Mário as Chefe da Cooperativa
- Milhem Cortaz as Major Chagas
- Rogério Fróes as Seu Lorenço
- Bella Camero as Ângela Souto
- Carlo Mossy as Lúcifer Santos
- Pierre Baitelli as Dario
- Charles Fricks as Wolf
- Hamilton Vaz Pereira as Inácio

== Reception ==
=== Awards and nominations ===
==== International Emmy Award ====
Year	Category	Nominee	Result	Ref
2019	Non-English Language U.S. Primetime Program	Magnífica 70	Nominated	
