= Maria Zilda Bethlem =

Brazilian actress

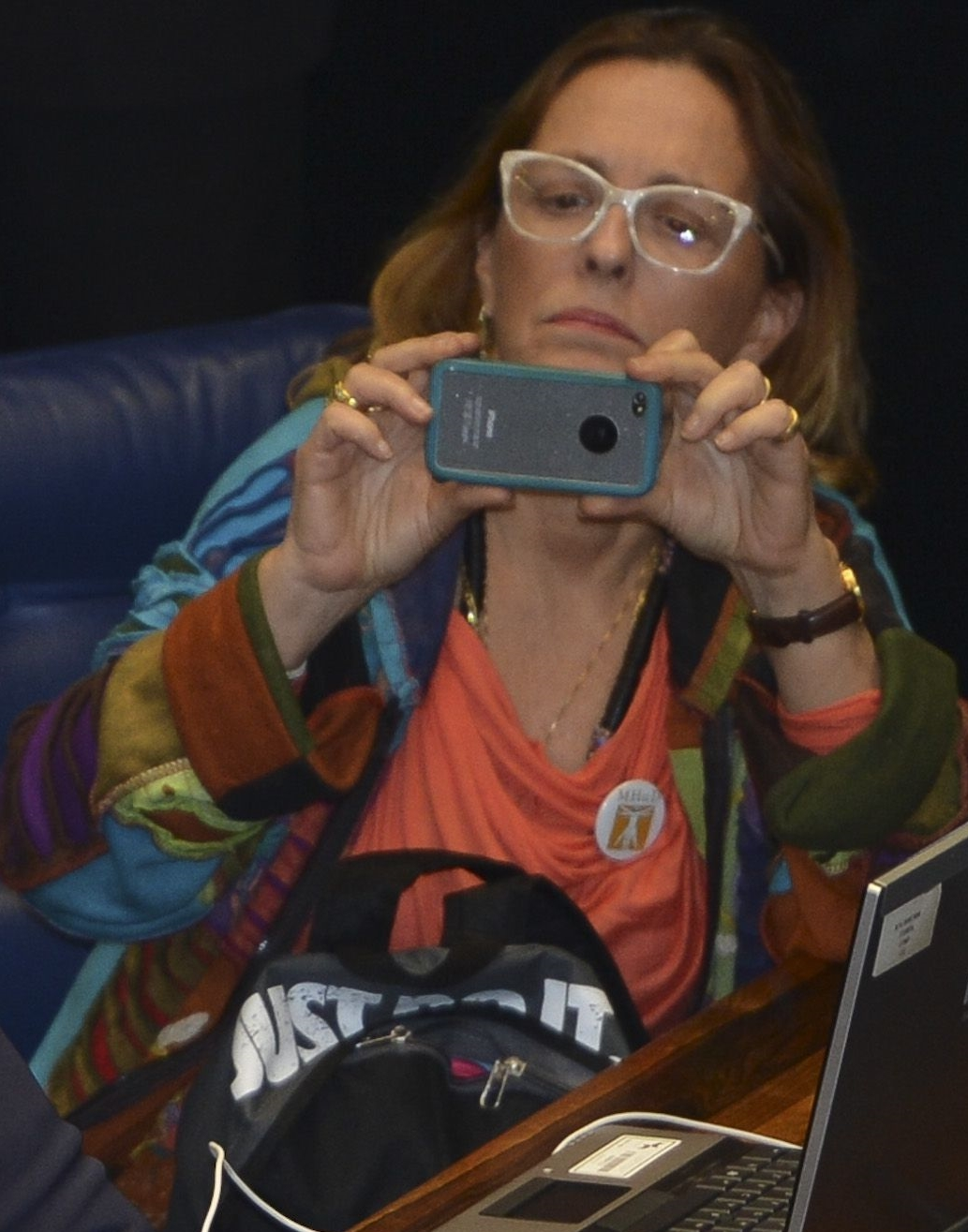
- Maria Zilda Bethlem in 2014
- Born: October 20, 1951 (age 74); Rio de Janeiro, Brazil
- Other name: Maria Zilda
- Occupation: Actress
- Years active: 1974–present

Maria Zilda Bethlem (born October 20, 1951), also known as Maria Zilda, is a Brazilian actress. She is known for the role of Verônica in the Rede Globo telenovela Vereda Tropical.

She won the Best Actress Award at the 1993 Brasília Film Festival for her performance in Vagas para Moças de Fino Trato, also winning the same award at the 2000 Gramado Film Festival for her role in Eu Não Conhecia Tururu.

Bethlem was married to television director Roberto Talma, with whom she had her younger son, filmmaker Raphael Vieira. She was directed by Raphael Vieira in the 2017 American feature film Untouched. She is also the mother of politician Rodrigo Bethlem from a previous marriage. Rodrigo is the father of her granddaughter Vitória. In October 2013, she publicly revealed her marriage, that had occurred in 2008, with the architect Ana Kalil. In May 2017, she announced that she was separated, during an interview for TV Fama.

== Filmography ==
Year	Title	Role
1974	Fogo sobre Terra	Maria de Fátima de Oliveira (Maria Fumaça)
1975	Escalada	Ester
1977	Nina	Mirna Camargo Aguiar (Mimi)
1978	Sem Lenço, sem Documento	Sulamita
1979	Plantão de Polícia	Mara Duarte dos Santos (Eps: "O Crime do Vidigal")
1979	A Intrusa	Juliana
1980	Água Viva	Gilda Sarpo
1980	Coração Alado	Glória Pinheiro Batista
1981	Jogo da Vida	Rosana Ramos Cruz
1983	Guerra dos Sexos	Vânia Trabuco de Moraes
1984	Meu Destino É Pecar	Margarida Santa Rita Avelar
1984	Meu Destino É Pecar	Evangelina Santa Rita (Regina / Guida)
1984	Vereda Tropical	Verônica de Oliva Salgado
1986	Selva de Pedra	Laura Vilhena
1986	Cida, a Gata Roqueira	Anastácia Tremaine
1986	Hipertensão	Carina de Freitas Leite
1988	Bebê a Bordo	Ângela Maria
1989	Top Model	Mariza Borges Magalhães
1990	TV Pirata	Various roles
1991	Vamp	Telma Leite
1992	Você Decide	Lúcia Helena Neves (Eps: "Coração na Mão")
1992	De Corpo e Alma	Beatriz Lopes Jordão (Bia)
1993	Olho no Olho	Walkíria Brenner
1995	Decadência	Irene Castro Melher
1995	Você Decide	Judith Pereira (Eps: "Veneno Ambiente")
1996	Você Decide	Gláucia Bueno (Eps: "Molambo de Gente")
1996	Vira Lata	Cassandra Moreira
1997	Você Decide	Norma de Sousa (Eps: "Norma")
1997	Por Amor	Flávia Nogueira Dantas
1998	Sai de Baixo	Dolores Montovani (Eps: "Dolores Pra Lá, Dolores Pra Cá")
1998	Malhação	Catarina da Silva Manhães
1999	Você Decide	Érica Motta (Eps: "Transas de Família - Parte I")
1999	Você Decide	Érica Motta (Eps: "Transas de Família - Parte II")
2000	Você Decide	Érica Motta (Eps: "Transas de Família - Parte III")
2000	Você Decide	Érica Motta (Eps: "Transas de Família - Parte IV")
2000	Você Decide	Érica Motta (Eps: "Transas de Família - Parte V")
2003	Agora É que São Elas	Ruth Castro (Rutinha)
2005	A Lua Me Disse	Zelândia Fortunato
2006	Pé na Jaca	Alma Abranches
2007	Sete Pecados	Cíntia Alves
2008	Faça Sua História	Dora Maria Prado (Eps: "A Estrela da TV")
2008	Faça Sua História	Letícia Barros (Eps: "O Último Casal Feliz")
2009	Caras & Bocas	Leandra Silveira Lontra (Léa)
2010	Ti Ti Ti	Gildete Malta (Madame Gigi)
2011	Aquele Beijo	Olga Ferreira Medeiros
2016	Êta Mundo Bom!	Emma Thierry Lafayette
2017	Untouched	Alex
2018	Magnifica 70	Madre
2019	Chuteira Preta	Dolores Castanho
2019	Pico da Neblina	Suzette
