= Bebê a Bordo =

- Genre: Telenovela
- Created by: Carlos Lombardi
- Starring: Isabela Garcia; Tony Ramos; Dina Sfat; Maria Zilda Bethlem; Ary Fontoura; Armando Bógus; José de Abreu; Inês Galvão; Léo Jaime; Guilherme Fontes; Guilherme Leme; Sílvia Buarque; Nicette Bruno; Sebastião Vasconcelos; Débora Duarte; Patrícya Travassos; Rodolfo Bottino
- Opening theme: "Amor e Bombas"
- Composer: Eduardo Dussek
- Country of origin: Brazil
- Original language: Portuguese
- No. of episodes: 209

Production
- Running time: 50 minutes

Original release
- Network: TV Globo
- Release: June 13, 1988 – February 11, 1989

Bebê a Bordo (Baby on Board in English) is a Brazilian telenovela produced and broadcast on TV Globo at a timeslot of 7:00pm, from June 13, 1988 to February 11, 1989, consisting of 209 episodes.

== Plot ==
Ana (Isabela Garcia) ends up repeating the actions of her mother, who abandoned her at birth. But fate is lending a helping hand as Ana unknowingly drops off her baby girl, Helena (Beatriz Bertu/Adriana Valbon), at the house of Laura (Dina Sfat), her mother. Meanwhile, Tonico Ladeira (Tony Ramos), Zezinho (Léo Jaime), Antonio Antonucci (Rodolfo Bottino), and the brothers Tonhão (José de Abreu), Rei (Guilherme Fontes) and Rico (Guilherme Leme), are disputing the paternity of the girl, as Ana does not know who Helena's father might be. There also is Ângela (Maria Zilda Bethlem), an efficient but repressed secretary working for Tonico who is dedicated to care for her siblings Caco (Tarcísio Filho) and Zetó (Jorge Fernando). She falls for the radio announcer, Tonhão, who she realizes is the ominous man destined to be the love of her life from her dreams.

== Cast ==
- Isabela Garcia as Ana Bezerra / Sílvia Siqueira Ramos
- Tony Ramos as Antônio Ladeira (Tonico)
- Dina Sfat as Laura Petraglia
- Maria Zilda Bethlem as Ângela Maria
- Ary Fontoura as Nero Petraglia
- Armando Bógus as Alcides Lima Coutinho (Liminha)
- José de Abreu as Antônio Barbirotto (Tonhão)
- Inês Galvão as Sônia (Soninha)
- Léo Jaime as José (Zezinho)
- Nicette Bruno as Branca Ladeira
- Sebastião Vasconcelos as Tarcísio Barbirotto (Tico)
- Débora Duarte as Joana Mendonça
- Patrícya Travassos as Ester Ladeira Amado
- Rodolfo Bottino as Antonio Antonucci
- Guilherme Fontes as Reinaldo Luís Barbirotto (Rei)
- Guilherme Leme as Ricardo Antônio Barbirotto (Rico)
- Sílvia Buarque as Raio-de-luar
- Françoise Forton as Glória Ladeira
- Carla Marins as Maria Luísa (Sininho)
- Márcia Real as Walkíria
- Paulo Figueiredo as Eduardo Augusto Rêgo Grande (Dinho)
- Sílvia Bandeira as Lourdes (Dinha)
- Tarcísio Filho as Carlos Antônio (Caco)
- Paulo Guarnieri as Nicolau Petraglia
- Felipe Pinheiro as Ladslau Petraglia
- Deborah Evelyn as Fânia Favale
- Ilva Niño as Mainha
- João Signorelli as Celso Bezerra
- Irving São Paulo as Bad Cat
- Cristina Sano as Grega
- Jorge Fernando as José Antônio (Zetó)
- Leina Krespi as Vespúcia (Vespa)
- Fábio Pillar as Gilberto Amado (Amado)
- Anderson Müller as Bad Boy
- Sônia Mamede as Ilka
- Duda Mamberti as Téo
- Chiquinho Brandão as Joca
- Edson Silva as Severo
- Carla Tausz as Elza
- Beatriz Bertu and Adriana Valbon as Heleninha (the baby)
- João Rebello as Juninho Ladeira
- Catarina Dahl as Flavinha
- Lilian Leal as Luciana

=== Cameo ===
- Tereza Rachel as Luciana Mendonça
- Cláudia Magno as Gilda
- Bel Kutner as Laura (young)
- Vera Holtz as Madalena
- Evandro Mesquita as Raúl e Pancho (cicerones)
- Bebel Gilberto as Marisol
- Paolette as Osvaldão
- Carlos Eduardo Dolabella as Augusto
- Tonico Pereira as Válter
- Emiliano Queiroz as Brito
- Mauro Mendonça as Senator Favalle
- Cininha de Paula as woman of Senator Favalle
- Joyce de Oliveira as Sra. Perácia Prado Almeida
- Pedro Cardoso as Flávio
- Rosita Thomaz Lopes as Dona Maria Clara
- Alexandre Zacchia
- Nica Bonfim
- Bemvindo Sequeira
- Lucy Mafra
- Claudia Mauro as Dona Brígida
- Paulo César Grande
- Marcos Wainberg as Leonel
- Carlos Takeshi as Xangai
- Beatriz Lyra as Physician
