= The Greatest Love of All (2006 film) =

- Theatrical release poster
- Directed by: Carlos Diegues
- Written by: Carlos Diegues
- Produced by: Renata Almeida Magalhães
- Starring: José Wilker; Taís Araújo
- Cinematography: Lauro Escorel
- Edited by: Quito Ribeiro
- Music by: Chico Buarque de Hollanda; Guto Graça Mello
- Production companies: Luz Mágica Produções Audiovisuais; Columbia Pictures; Globo Filmes
- Distributed by: Sony Pictures; Columbia TriStar Filmes do Brasil
- Release date: September 7, 2006
- Running time: 98 minutes
- Country: Brazil
- Language: Portuguese
- Budget: R$7.5 million
- Box office: R$1,723,672

The Greatest Love of All (Portuguese: O Maior Amor do Mundo; also known as The Greatest Love in the World) is a 2006 Brazilian romantic drama film directed by Carlos Diegues. Filming took place in 60 locations in Rio de Janeiro.

== Plot ==
The film follows Antônio (José Wilker), an astrophysicist who has lived most of his life in the United States, as he returns to Brazil in search of his past and his biological parents. In Brazil, Antônio becomes aware he has a serious illness, whilst he falls in love for Antônia (Taís Araújo), a local girl.

== Cast ==
- José Wilker as Antônio
  - Max Fercondini as young Antônio
- Taís Araújo as Luciana
- Sérgio Britto as maestro
  - Marco Ricca as young maestro
- Léa Garcia as Zezé
- Anna Sophia Folch as Girl
- Hugo Carvana as Salvador
- Clara Carvalho as Sônia
- Deborah Evelyn as Carolina
- Sérgio Malheiros as Mosca
- Sílvio Guindane as Dabé
- Erika Mader as Pit

== Reception ==
It shared the Grand Prize of the Americas, the top prize at the 30th Montreal World Film Festival, with Eiji Okuda's A Long Walk. It also won the Young Europeans Jury Award of the 2006 Biarritz Film Festival, Best Music Award of the 28th Havana Film Festival, and Special Mention Award of the 24th Mar del Plata Film Festival.
