= Daisy Lúcidi =

Brazilian actress (1929–2020)

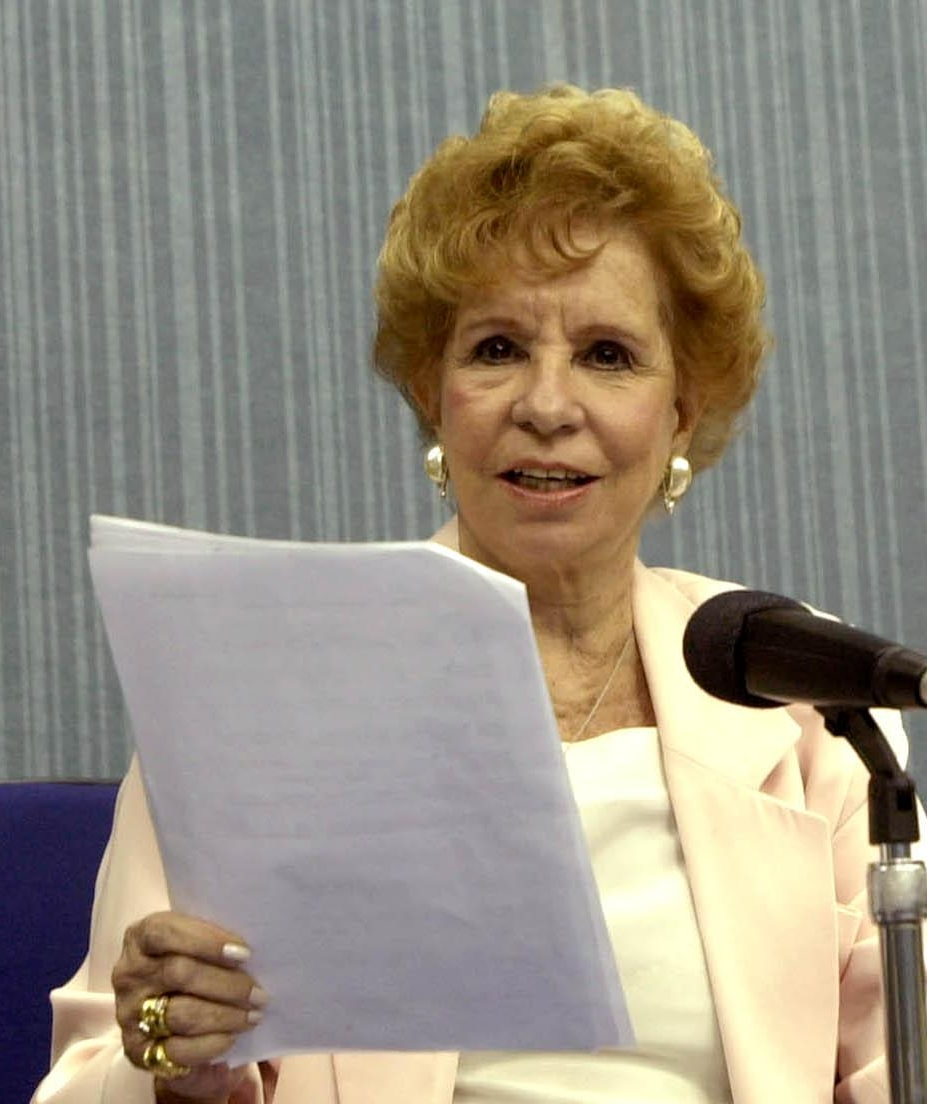
- Lúcidi at the Rádio Nacional studios in 2004

Member of the Legislative Assembly of Rio de Janeiro
- In office 1980–1988?

City Councillor of the Municipal Chamber of Rio de Janeiro
- In office 1976–1980

Personal details
- Born: Daisy Lopes Lúcidi; 10 August 1929 Rio de Janeiro, Federal District, Brazil
- Died: 7 May 2020 (aged 90) Rio de Janeiro, Brazil
- Spouse: Luiz Mendes (m. 1947; died 2011)
- Children: 1
- Profession: Actress; politician; radio broadcaster

Daisy Lopes Lúcidi Mendes (10 August 1929 – 7 May 2020) was a Brazilian actress, radio broadcaster, and politician.

== Life ==
Beginning her career in radio, her best known roles were in the television series Supermanoela, Paraíso Tropical, Babilônia, and Passione.

As a politician, Lúcidi served as a Municipal Chamber of Rio de Janeiro city councilwoman and then as a deputy of the state Legislative Assembly of Rio de Janeiro for two consecutive terms.

== Death ==
Daisy Lúcidi died from COVID-19-related complications during the COVID-19 pandemic in Brazil at the Hospital São Lucas in the South Zone neighborhood of Rio de Janeiro on 7 May 2020, at the age of 90. She had been hospitalized in the intensive care unit for coronavirus treatment since April 25, 2020.

== Selected filmography ==
Cinema
Year	Title	Role	Notes
1948	Folias Cariocas		
1951	Dentro da Vida	Marta	
1970	Quatro Contra o Mundo		
1972	Eu Transo, Ela Transa	Dedé	
2012	As Aventuras de Agamenon, o Repórter	Isaura Coroa	
2013	Vendo ou Alugo	Kita	

Television
Year	Title	Network	Role	Notes
1963	Nuvem de Fogo	TV Rio		
1969	Enquanto Houver Estrelas	Rede Tupi	Liliane	
1973	João da Silva	TV Rio	Norma	
1974	Supermanoela	Rede Globo	Maria Elvira	
1975	Bravo!	Rede Globo		
1976	O Casarão	Rede Globo	Alice Souza Lins	
2007	Paraíso Tropical	Rede Globo	Iracema	
2010–2011	Passione	Rede Globo	Valentina Miranda	
2014	Geração Brasil	Rede Globo	Madalena	
2015	Babilônia	Rede Globo	Dulce	
2015	Os Homens São de Marte... E é pra Lá que Eu Vou	GNT	Erenice	
