= Celebridade =

Brazilian telenovela (2003–2004)

- Genre: Telenovela
- Created by: Gilberto Braga
- Directed by: Dennis Carvalho; Marcos Schechtman; Amora Mautner; Vinícius Coimbra
- Starring: Malu Mader; Marcos Palmeira; Cláudia Abreu; Fábio Assunção; Deborah Evelyn; Márcio Garcia; Hugo Carvana; Deborah Secco; Marcelo Faria; Juliana Paes; Nívea Maria; Ana Beatriz Nogueira; Taumaturgo Ferreira; Isabela Garcia; Roberto Bomfim; Alexandre Borges; Júlia Lemmertz; Bruno Gagliasso; Juliana Knust; Nathália Timberg
- Theme music composer: Barry White
- Opening theme: "Love's Theme" by the Love Unlimited Orchestra
- Country of origin: Brazil
- Original language: Portuguese
- No. of episodes: 221

Production
- Running time: 50 minutes
- Production company: Central Globo de Produção

Original release
- Network: Rede Globo
- Release: October 13, 2003 – June 25, 2004

Celebridade is a Brazilian telenovela that was produced and aired by TV Globo from 13 October 2003 to 25 June 2004, totaling 221 episodes.

Featured Malu Mader, Marcos Palmeira, Cláudia Abreu, Fábio Assunção, Marcio Garcia, Deborah Secco, Juliana Paes, Marcelo Faria, Alexandre Borges, Júlia Lemmertz, Nathalia Timberg, Bruno Gagliasso, Hugo Carvana, Nívea Maria, Juliana Knust and Deborah Evelyn in leading roles.

== Plot ==
The plot revolves around the rivalry between two women: successful businesswoman and former model Maria Clara Diniz, owner of Mello Diniz event producing company, and the envious Laura Prudente da Costa, which gets close to Maria Clara claiming to be her greatest fan and gets a job in her company.

In fact, Laura is an imposter who wants not only to take everything from the other woman, but become a new Maria Clara. In the plot, the reason for Laura's hatred of Maria Clara is that she (Laura) is the daughter of the true muse who inspired the song that made Maria Clara a rich and famous woman, while she and her mother suffered a miserable life. Maria Clara, however, always believed that the song had been composed by her ex-boyfriend Wagner in her honor. To carry out the plan to destroy her rival, Laura enlists the help of Marcos, her lover and accomplice. They begin to work for Maria Clara respectively as an assistant and a driver, and slowly infiltrate themselves into her life.

== Cast ==
| Actor | Character |
|---|---|
| Malu Mader | Maria Clara Mello Diniz |
| Cláudia Abreu | Maria Laura Prudente da Costa |
| Marcos Palmeira | Fernando Amorim |
| Fábio Assunção | Renato Mendes |
| Márcio Garcia | Marcos Rangel |
| Deborah Evelyn | Beatriz Vasconcellos Amorim |
| Deborah Secco | Darlene Sampaio |
| Marcelo Faria | Vladimir Coimbra |
| Ana Beatriz Nogueira | Ana Paula Mello Diniz Moutinho |
| Taumaturgo Ferreira | Nelito Moutinho |
| Roberto Bomfim | Salvador Amorim |
| Isabela Garcia | Eliete Coimbra |
| Julia Lemmertz | Noêmia Assunção |
| Alexandre Borges | Cristiano Reis |
| Gracindo Júnior | Ubaldo Quintela |
| Daniel Dantas | Ademar Sampaio |
| Hugo Carvana | Lineu Vasconcellos |
| Nívea Maria | Corina Mello Diniz |
| Bruno Gagliasso | Inácio Vasconcelos Amorim |
| Paulo Vilhena | Paulo César Assunção |
| Juliana Knust | Sandra Mello Diniz Moutinho |
| Juliana Paes | Jaqueline Joy (Jaqueline da Silva Leitão) |
| Henri Castelli | Hugo |
| Kadu Moliterno | Daniel Freire |
| Nathalia Timberg | Yolanda Mendes |
| Lavínia Vlasak | Tânia Nascimento |
| Sérgio Menezes | Bruno Carvalho |
| Roberto Pirillo | Ernesto Lopes |
| André Barros | Joel Cavalcanti |
| Norma Blum | Hercília Prudente da Costa |
| Nelson Dantas | Dr. Alcir Medeiros |
| Brunno Abrahão | José Carlos Mendes Beato Reis (Zeca) |
| Marcelo Laham | Ivan |
| Oswaldo Loureiro | Dr. Roberto Peixoto |
| Carlos Evelyn | Oscar |
| Jairo Mattos | Delegado Lourival |
| Alexandre Moreno | Tadeu Santana |
| Carla Faour | Kátia |
| Nildo Parente | Wanderley Mourão |
| Débora Lamm | Vitória Souto |
| Marcelo Valle | Guilherme Ribeiro Couto |
| Cristina Amadeo | Olga |
| Sheron Menezzes | Iara |
| Janaína Lince | Zaíra |
| Joana Limaverde | Fabiana Modesto |
| Antônio Pitanga | Comandante |
| Théo Becker | Caio Mendes |
| Fábio Araújo | Kléber Duarte |
| Adriana Alves | Palmira Pinto Feijó |
| Paula Pereira | Vanda Guimarães |
| Dennis Carvalho | Eduardo Luís Assunção |

== Awards and nominations ==
| Year | Award | Category | Nomination | Result | Ref. |
|---|---|---|---|---|---|
| 2004 | Contigo TV Award | Best Soap Opera | | Nominated | |
| 2004 | Contigo TV Award | Best Actress in a Leading Role | Cláudia Abreu | Won | |
| 2004 | Contigo TV Award | Best Actress in a Leading Role | Malu Mader | Nominated | |
| 2004 | Contigo TV Award | Best Actor in a Leading Role | Fábio Assunção | Nominated | |
| 2004 | Contigo TV Award | Best Actor in a Leading Role | Marcos Palmeira | Nominated | |
| 2004 | Contigo TV Award | Best Actress in a Supporting Role | Deborah Evelyn | Nominated | |
| 2004 | Contigo TV Award | Best Actress in a Supporting Role | Deborah Secco | Nominated | |
| 2004 | Contigo TV Award | Best Actor in a Supporting Role | Taumaturgo Ferreira | Nominated | |
| 2004 | Contigo TV Award | Best Female Newcomer | Juliana Knust | Nominated | |
| 2004 | Contigo TV Award | Best Younger Actor | Brunno Abrahão | Won | |
| 2004 | Contigo TV Award | Best Writer | Gilberto Braga | Nominated | |
| 2004 | Contigo TV Award | Best Director | Dennis Carvalho | Nominated | |
| 2004 | Contigo TV Award | Best Makeup | —N/a | Nominated | |
| 2004 | São Paulo Association of Critics Art | Best Soap Opera | | Won | |
| 2004 | Prêmio Arte Qualidade Brasil - RJ | Melhor Telenovela | | Won | |
| 2004 | Prêmio Arte Qualidade Brasil - RJ | Melhor Atriz | Cláudia Abreu | Won | |
| 2004 | Prêmio Arte Qualidade Brasil - RJ | Melhor Ator | Fábio Assunção | Won | |
| 2004 | Prêmio Arte Qualidade Brasil - RJ | Melhor Atriz Coadjuvante | Ana Beatriz Nogueira | Won | |
| 2004 | Prêmio Arte Qualidade Brasil - RJ | Melhor Ator Coadjuvante | Márcio Garcia | Won | |
| 2004 | Prêmio Arte Qualidade Brasil - RJ | Best Writer | Gilberto Braga | Won | |
| 2004 | Prêmio Arte Qualidade Brasil - RJ | Best Director | Dennis Carvalho and Marcos Schechtman | Won | |
| 2004 | Extra Television Award | Best Soap Opera | | Won | |
| 2004 | Extra Television Award | Best Actress | Cláudia Abreu | Nominated | |
| 2004 | Extra Television Award | Best Actor | Fábio Assunção | Nominated | |
| 2004 | Trófeu Raça Negra | Best Newcomer Actress | Adriana Alves | Won | |
| 2004 | Meus Prêmios Nick | Favorite Vilain | Cláudia Abreu | Won | |
| 2004 | Meus Prêmios Nick | Favorite Actor | Fábio Assunção | Won | |
| 2004 | Meus Prêmios Nick | Favorite Actress | Deborah Secco | Won | |
| 2004 | TV Press Awards | Best Actor in a Leading Role | Fábio Assunção | Won | |
| 2004 | Brazil Art Quality Awards SP | Best Actress in a Leading Role | Cláudia Abreu | Won | |
| 2004 | Brazil Art Quality Awards SP | Best Actress in a Supporting Role | Ana Beatriz Nogueira (tied with Jussara Freire for Cabocla) | Won | |
| 2004 | Austregésilo de Athayde Award | Best Actress in a Leading Role | Malu Mader | Won | |
| 2004 | Austregésilo de Athayde Award | Best Actor in a Leading Role | Marcos Palmeira | Won | |
| 2004 | Austregésilo de Athayde Award | Best Newcomer Actress | Juliana Knust | Won | |
| 2004 | Austregésilo de Athayde Award | Best Younger Newcomer | Brunno Abrahão | Won | |
| 2004 | Golden Super Cap Awards | Best Actor in Television | Alexandre Borges | Won | |
| 2004 | Golden Super Cap Awards | Best Actor in Television | Gracindo Júnior | Won | |
| 2004 | Golden Super Cap Awards | Best Actress in Television | Júlia Lemmertz | Won | |
| 2004 | Golden Super Cap Awards | Best Actress in Television | Nívea Maria | Won | |
| 2004 | Golden Super Cap Awards | Best Actress in Television | Norma Blum | Won | |
| 2004 | Master Award - Jornal of Clubes | Destaque na Televisão | Brunno Abrahão | Won | |
| 2004 | Trophy Top of Business | Best Actress | Adriana Alves | Nominated | |
