= Paraíso Tropical =

- Genre: Telenovela
- Created by: Gilberto Braga; Ricardo Linhares
- Directed by: Dennis Carvalho
- Starring: Alessandra Negrini; Fábio Assunção; Wagner Moura; Camila Pitanga; Glória Pires; Tony Ramos; Maria Fernanda Cândido; Renée de Vielmond; Marcello Antony; Bruno Gagliasso; Vera Holtz; Rodrigo Veronese
- Opening theme: "Sábado em Copacabana"
- Composer: Maria Bethânia
- Country of origin: Brazil
- Original language: Portuguese
- No. of episodes: 179; 140 (international version)

Production
- Production locations: Copacabana, Rio de Janeiro; Bahia
- Running time: 50 minutes
- Production company: Central Globo de Produção

Original release
- Network: Rede Globo
- Release: 5 March – 28 September 2007

Paraíso Tropical (English: Tropical Paradise) is a Brazilian primetime telenovela that was produced and broadcast by TV Globo from 5 March and 28 September 2007, with 179 episodes.

Written by Gilberto Braga and Ricardo Linhares and directed by Dennis Carvalho. Starring Alessandra Negrini, Fábio Assunção, Glória Pires, Tony Ramos, Wagner Moura and Camila Pitanga in the leading roles.

In 2008, the show was nominated for the International Emmy Award for Best Telenovela, losing to Jordanian soap The Invasion.

== Plot ==
Paraíso Tropical is a modern-day urban story that takes place in Rio de Janeiro, where Antenor Cavalcanti has his luxurious hotel company headquarter.

Despite his vast fortune, Antenor is bitter for not having an heir to his empire. The search for a successor provokes the beginning of a clash between two young and talented executives of his group: Daniel Bastos, a lad of simple origins and excellent character, who is not only handsome and charming, but also intelligent and skilled, and Olavo Novaes, an ambitious and unscrupulous man who is ready to fight for the position, at any cost.

To fight against Olavo's treacherous plans, Daniel will have the help of the sweet and sensitive Paula, a young lady raised as an only child who discovers, on the eve of her mother's death, that she is adopted and has a family. What Paula does not know is that she has an identical twin sister, the wicked Taís, who is as ambitious and unscrupulous as the man who becomes her main ally, Olavo Novaes. Antenor, for his part, decides to have an heir when he meets the headstrong and honest Lúcia, a woman who will make this cold businessman find true love is and a real reason to live.

== Cast ==
Actor	Character
Alessandra Negrini	Paula Viana Bastos/Taís Grimaldi
Fábio Assunção	Daniel Bastos
Wagner Moura	Olavo Novaes
Camila Pitanga	Bebel (Francisbel dos Santos Batista)
Tony Ramos	Antenor Cavalcanti
Glória Pires	Lúcia Vilela
Marcello Antony	Cássio Gouvêia
Vera Holtz	Marion Novaes
Bruno Gagliasso	Ivan Corrêa Novaes
Beth Goulart	Neli Veloso Schneider
Daniel Dantas	Heitor Schneider
Isabela Garcia	Dinorá Brandão Martelli
Marco Ricca	Gustavo Martelli
Débora Duarte	Hermínia Vilela
Reginaldo Faria	Clemente Vilela
Fernanda Machado	Joana Veloso Schneider
Gustavo Leão	Mateus Vilela Gouveia
Patrícia Werneck	Camila Veloso Schneider Navarro
Paulo Vilhena	Fred (Frederico Navarro)
Renée de Vielmond	Ana Luísa Cavalcanti
Rodrigo Veronese	Lucas Aboim
Hugo Carvana	Belisário Cavalcanti
Yoná Magalhães	Virgínia Batista
Chico Diaz	Jáder
Daisy Lúcidi	Iracema Brandão
Edwin Luisi	Lutero Sampaio
Guilhermina Guinle	Alice Sampaio
Otávio Müller	Vidal (Cupertino Vidal)
Carlos Casagrande	Rodrigo Sampaio
Sérgio Abreu	Tiago Batista
Marcelo Valle	Sérgio Otávio
Luli Miller	Gilda Batista
Lidi Lisboa	Tatiana
José Augusto Branco	Nereu Bastos
Eduardo Galvão	Urbano Monteiro
Erika Mader	Susaninha (Susana Vidal)
Jonathan Haagensen	Cláudio Ferreira
Ernani Moraes	Delegado Hélio
Roberto Maya	Xavier
Ildi Silva	Yvone
Roberta Rodrigues	Eloísa
Nildo Parente	Pacífico
Thaís Garayp	Zoraide
Juliana Didone	Fernanda Navarro
Yaçanã Martins	Otília
Patrícia Naves	Sheyla
Nívea Helen	Cristina
Raquel Parpnelli	Úrsula
Larissa Queiroz	Rita
Flávia Pyramo	Wilma
Maria Eduarda	Odete
Sandro Ximenez	Carlinhos
Fábio Nascimento	Luciano
Marcos Otávio	William
Dudu Cury	Júlio César Brandão Martelli
Vitor Novello	Zé Luís (José Luís Grimaldi)
Thávyne Ferrari	Márcia Maria Brandão Martelli
Othon Bastos	Isidoro Grimaldi
Susana Vieira	Amélia Viana
Rosamaria Murtinho	Dolores
Maria Fernanda Cândido	Fabiana
Otávio Augusto	Osvaldo
Paulo Betti	Lucena
Ângela Vieira	Cleonice
Marcelo Laham	Hugo
Deborah Secco	Betina Moneteiro
Ísis Valverde	Telma

== Ratings ==
Timeslot	# Eps.	Premiere		Finale		Rank	Season	Average viewership
Timeslot	# Eps.	Date	Viewers (in points)	Date	Viewers (in points)	Rank	Season	Average viewership
Monday—Saturday; 8:50 pm	179	5 March 2007	41	28 September 2007	56	#1	2007	43
