= Pátria Minha =

- Genre: Telenovela
- Created by: Gilberto Braga
- Directed by: Dennis Carvalho
- Starring: Tarcísio Meira; Vera Fischer; José Mayer; Cláudia Abreu; Fábio Assunção; Isadora Ribeiro; Eva Wilma; Renata Sorrah; Petrônio Gontijo
- Opening theme: "Onde o Céu Azul é Mais Azul" - Instrumental
- Country of origin: Brazil
- Original language: Portuguese
- No. of episodes: 203

Production
- Running time: 50 minutes

Original release
- Network: TV Globo
- Release: 18 July 1994 – 10 March 1995

Related
- Fera Ferida; A Próxima Vítima

Pátria Minha (English: My Homeland) is a Brazilian telenovela produced and broadcast by TV Globo. It premiered on 18 July 1994, replacing Fera Ferida and ended on 10 March 1995. It was created by Gilberto Braga and directed by Dennis Carvalho.

== Cast ==
| Actor | Character |
|---|---|
| Tarcísio Meira | Raul Pellegrini |
| Vera Fischer | Lídia Laport |
| José Mayer | Pedro Fonseca |
| Cláudia Abreu | Alice Proença Pellegrini Laport |
| Fábio Assunção | Rodrigo Laport |
| Eva Wilma | Teresa Pellegrini |
| Carlos Zara | Evandro Aboim |
| Renata Sorrah | Natália Proença |
| Nuno Leal Maia | Osmar |
| Renée de Vielmond | Marininha (Marina Aboim) |
| Carlos Vereza | Max Laport |
| Marieta Severo | Loretta Pellegrini Vilela |
| Petrônio Gontijo | Murilo Henrique Pellegrini Vilela |
| Isadora Ribeiro | Cilene Miranda |
| Felipe Camargo | Inácio Fonseca |
| Deborah Evelyn | Bárbara |
| Luíza Tomé | Isabel Nogueira |
| Pedro Cardoso | Albano |
| Lília Cabral | Simone da Silva |
| Débora Duarte | Carmita |
| Isabel Fillardis | Yone Ribeiro |
| Ivan Cândido | Deodato Fonseca |
| André Pimentel | Joel Fonseca |
| Rodolfo Bottino | Heitor |
| Chica Xavier | Zilá |
| Aléxia Deschamps | Alexandra |
| Rosita Thomaz Lopes | Úrsula |
| Alexandre Moreno | Kennedy |
| Odete Lara | Walkíria |
| Paula Lavigne | Flávia Aboim |
| Stepan Nercessian | Devair Aguiar |
| Yaçanã Martins | Gracinda |
| Eduardo Caldas | Gabriel Fonseca |
| José D'Artagnan Júnior | Aderbal |
| Zeni Pereira | Isaura |
| Fátima Freire | Iracema |
| Nildo Parente | Fausto |
| Carlos Kroeber | Cristiano |
| Emílio de Mello | Hélio Pastor |
| Lu Mendonça | Lourdes |
| Cássia Linhares | Luciana |
| Rodrigo Santoro | Nando |
| Flávia Alessandra | Cláudia |
| Flávia Bonato | Daniela |
| Luciano Vianna | Ronaldo |
| Fábio Pillar | Etevaldo |
| Fernando Eiras | Dirceu |
| Paulo Reis | Ciro |
| Clementino Kelé | Rangel |
| Jane Bezerra | Carlota |
| Patrícia Novaes | Marilu |
| Cláudio Corrêa e Castro | Valdomiro Bezerra de Quental |
| Fúlvio Stefanini | Rafael Novaes |
