= Hugo Carvana =

Brazilian actor (1937–2014)

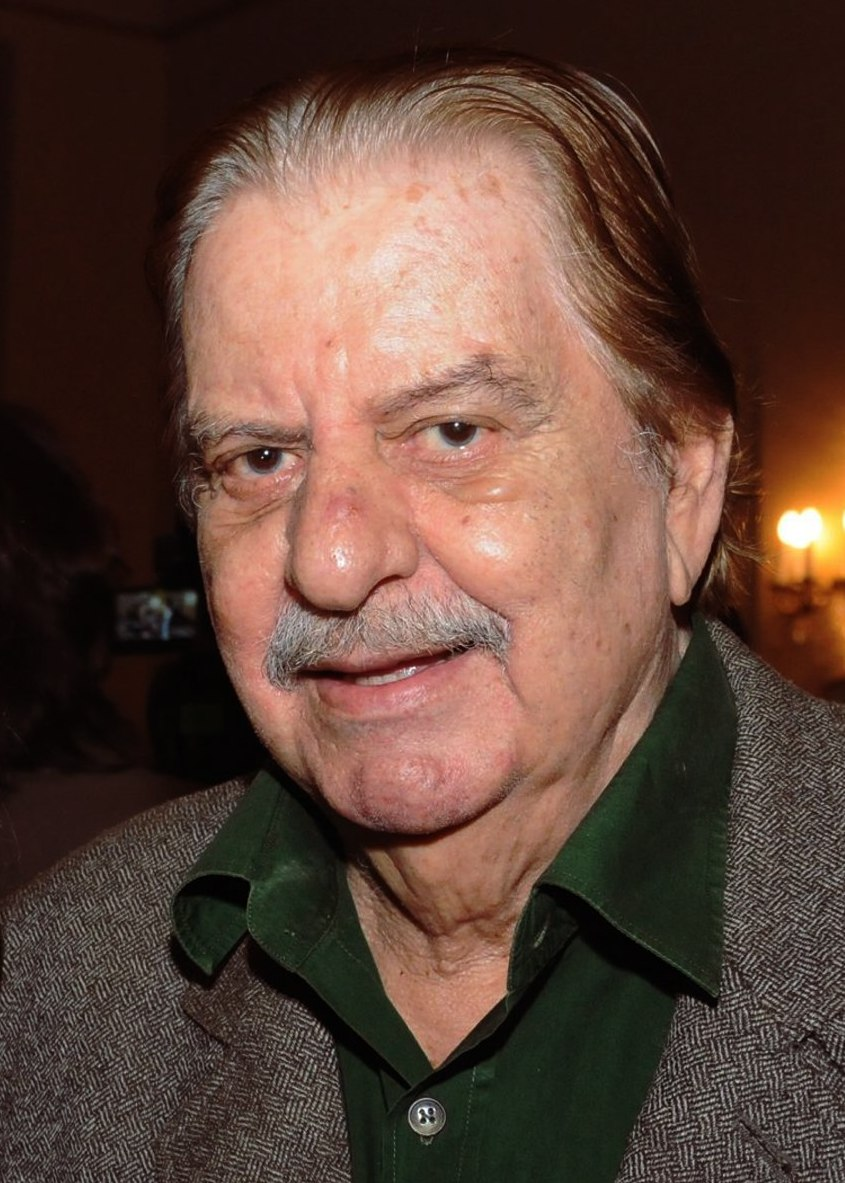
- Carvana in 2010
- Born: 4 June 1937; Rio de Janeiro, Brazil
- Died: 4 October 2014 (aged 77); Rio de Janeiro, Brazil
- Occupation: Actor
- Years active: 1954–2014
- Spouse: Martha Alencar (m. 1968)
- Children: 4

Hugo Carvana de Hollanda (4 June 1937 – 4 October 2014) was a Brazilian actor and film director. He appeared in more than 110 films and television shows between 1954 and 2014.

== Selected filmography ==
=== Film ===
- 1955: Trabalhou Bem, Genival
- 1956: O Contrabando
- 1957: Tudo é Música
- 1962: Os Cafajestes .... Photographer
- 1962: Esse Rio Que Eu Amo .... (segment "Noite de Almirante")
- 1964: Os Fuzis .... José
- 1965: A Falecida
- 1966: O Desafio .... Journalist
- 1966: A Grande Cidade ou As Aventuras e Desventuras de Luzia e Seus 3 Amigos Chegados de Longe .... Pereba
- 1967: Entranced Earth .... Alvaro
- 1968: O Homem Que Comprou o Mundo
- 1968: O Engano .... Husband
- 1968: O Bravo Guerreiro .... Union Hanger-On
- 1968: A Vida Provisória .... Pedro
- 1968: Antes, o Verão .... The Man
- 1969: Antonio das Mortes .... Mattos, the Police Officer
- 1969: Um Sonho de Vampiros .... (voice)
- 1969: Um Homem e Sua Jaula
- 1969: Tempo de Violência
- 1969: Pedro Diabo Ama Rosa Meia Noite
- 1969: O Anjo Nasceu .... Santamaria
- 1969: Macunaíma .... Man with the duck
- 1969: Como Vai, Vai Bem?
- 1970: The Heirs .... Maia
- 1970: Pindorama .... Governor
- 1970: The Seven Headed Lion .... Portuguese
- 1970: Jardim de Guerra
- 1971: Procura-se Uma Virgem
- 1971: O Rei dos Milagres
- 1971: Matei Por Amor
- 1971: Capitão Bandeira Contra o Dr. Moura Brasil .... Dr.Gestaile
- 1972: Quando o Carnaval Chegar .... Lourival
- 1972: Câncer
- 1973: All Nudity Shall Be Punished .... Comissário / Commissioner
- 1973: Tati .... Capitão Peixoto
- 1973: Vai Trabalhar Vagabundo .... Secundino Meireles
- 1973: Amor, Carnaval e Sonhos
- 1975: Ipanema, Adeus .... Carlos
- 1976: Un animal doué de déraison .... Hugo
- 1976: Gordos e Magros
- 1977: Tenda dos Milagres .... Fausto Pena
- 1977: Anchieta, José do Brasil
- 1977: A Queda .... José
- 1978: Se Segura, Malandro! .... Paulo Otávio
- 1978: Mar de Rosas .... Sérgio
- 1983: Bar Esperança .... Zeca
- 1984: Águia na Cabeça
- 1984: Bete Balanço .... Tony
- 1985: Avaete, Seed of Revenge .... Ramiro
- 1987: Leila Diniz .... Clyde
- 1990: Boca de Ouro
- 1990: Assim na Tela Como no Céu
- 1991: Vai Trabalhar, Vagabundo II – A Volta .... Dino
- 1997: O Homem Nu .... Taxi Driver
- 1999: Mauá – O Imperador e o Rei .... Queiroz
- 2001: Sonhos Tropicais .... Macedo
- 2002: Lara .... Ator Premiado
- 2003: God Is Brazilian .... Quincas Batalha
- 2003: Apolônio Brasil, Campeão da Alegria .... The Beggar
- 2005: Mais Uma Vez Amor .... Dr. Alvarez
- 2006: The Greatest Love of All .... Salvador
- 2007: Achados e Perdidos .... Juiz
- 2008: Casa da Mãe Joana .... Salomão
- 2009: Histórias de Amor Duram Apenas 90 Minutos .... Motorista de táxi
- 2010: 5x Favela, Agora por Nós Mesmos .... Dos Santos
- 2011: Não Se Preocupe, Nada Vai Dar Certo .... Zimba
- 2013: Giovanni Improtta .... Cantagallo
- 2014: Rio, I Love You .... Manoel (segment "Dona Fulana")

=== Television ===
- 1975: Cuca Legal .... Celso Maranhão (Jacaré)
- 1975: Gabriela .... Argileu Palmeira
- 1979: Plantão de Polícia .... Valdomiro Pena
- 1982: Quem Ama Não Mata (TV Mini-Series) .... Fonseca
- 1984: Corpo a Corpo .... Alfredo Fraga Dantas
- 1985: De Quina pra Lua .... Silva
- 1986: Roda de Fogo .... Paulo Costa
- 1990: Gente Fina .... Guilherme Azevedo Paiva
- 1991: O Dono do Mundo .... Lucas
- 1992: As Noivas de Copacabana (TV Mini-Series) .... delegado Adroaldo de Lima
- 1992: De Corpo e Alma .... Agenor Pinheiro
- 1993: Agosto (TV Mini-Series) .... Luiz Magalhães
- 1993: Fera Ferida .... Numa Pompílio de Castro
- 1995: Engraçadinha, seus amores e seus pecados (TV Mini-Series) .... irmão Fidélis
- 1995: Cara & Coroa .... Aníbal
- 1998: Corpo Dourado .... Azevedo
- 1999: Chiquinha Gonzaga (TV Mini-Series) .... Gouveia
- 1999: O Belo e as Feras .... barman
- 1999: Andando nas Nuvens .... Wagner Maciera
- 2001: Um Anjo Caiu do Céu .... Garcia
- 2001: Porto dos Milagres .... dr. Gouveia
- 2002: Desejos de Mulher .... Atílio
- 2003: Celebridade .... Lineu Vasconcelos
- 2004: Como uma Onda .... Sinésio
- 2006: JK (TV Mini-Series) .... Sampaio
- 2007: Paraíso Tropical .... Belisário Cavalcanti
- 2008: Casos e Acasos .... Álvaro
- 2008: Malhação .... Paulo Lopret
- 2008: Guerra e Paz .... Moreira
- 2008: Três Irmãs .... Dr. Andrade
- 2009: Malhação .... Inspetor Ubiracy Cansado
- 2010: Na Forma da Lei .... Jorginho Monteverde
- 2011: Insensato Coração .... Olegário Silveira (Seu Silveira)
- 2012: O Brado Retumbante .... Mourão
