= Isabela Garcia =

Brazilian actress (born 1967)

- Born: Isabela Garcia Costa; 11 June 1967 (age 58); Rio de Janeiro, Brazil
- Occupation: Actress
- Years active: 1971–present
- Spouse: Carlos Thiré (m. 2002; div. 2009)
- Children: 4
- Parent: Gilberto Garcia
- Relatives: Rosana Garcia (sister)

Isabela Garcia Costa (born 11 June 1967) is a Brazilian actress. In her youth, she was called the Brazilian "Shirley Temple".

== Biography ==
In Isabela made several theater performances, including Cantares em desafino (1983), Léo e Bia (1984), No coração do Brasil (1993), Luxúria, Soberba e Ira (1998), A dança dos mitos (1999), AHH com Os Melhores do Mundo (1999), Laboratório de Humor (2000), Alarmes (2001), Terceiras Intenções (2003) and Cruzes! Festa Surpresa! (2006). In 2010 he participated in the Christmas show at HSBC, in Curitiba.

In 2004, Isabela produced the show Beijo na boca, Carlos Thiré, her former husband. In 2009, he was in soap opera Cama de Gato.

In January 2018, the actress announced her departure from TV Globo, after 46 years on the station. Returning in the same year, being cast to the cast of the novel O Sétimo Guardião. Being your first contract work at work.

== Personal life ==
Isabela is the daughter of Dirce Prieto and of the radioator Gilberto Garcia, who died in 1996. She has two brothers and one sister Gilberto, Ricardo and Rosana Garcia, actress, performer of the famous Narizinho of Sítio do Picapau Amarelo.

She has four children: João Pedro Bonfá, Gabriella Garcia Wanderley and twins Francisco and Bernardo Thiré.

Isabela has a granddaughter, Luisa, born in 2011.

Isabela is a convert to Buddhism.

== Filmography ==
=== Television ===
Year	Title	Role	Note
1971	Caso Especial		Episode: "Medéia"
1973	O Semideus	Clara (Clarinha)	
1975	Roque Santeiro	Cristina de Aragão (Tininha)	Censored version
1976	Vejo a Lua no Céu	Doró	
1977	Despedida de Casado	Malu	Censored novel
1977	Nina	Isadora	
1978	Caso Especial		Episode: "O Homem Que Veio do Céu"
1978	Sítio do Picapau Amarelo	Tinker Bell	Special participation
1979	Pai Herói	Ângela Limeira Brandão Reis	Special participation
1980	Água Viva	Maria Helena Pedrosa Fragonard	
1981	O Amor É Nosso	Marina	
1982	Caso Verdade	Vanice	Episode: "O Menino do Olho Azul"
1982	Caso Verdade	Presenter	Episode: "O Bravo Soldado Bombeiro"
1984	Corpo a Corpo	Heloísa Bastos Pellegrini	
1985	De Quina pra Lua	Maria de Fátima de Jesus Batista (Fatinha)	
1986	Anos Dourados	Rosemary	
1986	Roda de Fogo	Ana Maria D'Ávila	
1987	Globo de Ouro	Presenter	
1988	Bebê a Bordo	Ana Bezerra / Sílvia Siqueira Ramos	
1989	O Sexo dos Anjos	Isabela	
1990	Lua Cheia de Amor	Mercedes Miranda	
1992	Perigosas Peruas	Violeta	Special participation
1993	Sonho Meu	Lúcia Guerra	
1994	Você Decide		Episode: "No Último Round"
1995	Irmãos Coragem	Lídia Siqueira	
1995	Explode Coração	Herself	Episode: "December 6, 1995"
1996	Você Decide		Episode: "A Troca"
1996	A Vida Como Ela É	Various characters	8 episodes
1997	O Amor Está no Ar	Flora	
1998	Labirinto	Yolanda de Toledo Galhardo Martins Fraga (Yoyô)	
1999	Andando nas Nuvens	Oneide	
2000	Brava Gente	Malu	Episode: "Um Parque Para Todos"
2000	Você Decide	Yeda	Episode: "Voyeur"
2001	Estrela-Guia	Luciana Teixeira	
2001	Sítio do Picapau Amarelo	Mrs. Merenguita	Episode: "A Festa da Cuca"
2003	Celebridade	Eliete Coimbra	
2004	A Diarista	Meire	Episode: "Lady Laura"
2004	Fazendo História		Participation
2006	JK	Déa Pinheiro	
2006	Belíssima	Norma Souza e Silva	Episode: "April 29, 2006"
2006	A Diarista	Michelly	Episode: "O Que o Figueirinha Tem?"
2006	A Grande Família	Socorro	Episode: "Jararaca e Lambisgóia"
2006	A Diarista	Maria Rita	Episode: "Pelíssima"
2007	Paraíso Tropical	Dinorá Brandão Martelli	
2008	Dicas de Um Sedutor	Renata	Episode: "Não É O Que Parece"
2008	Casos e Acasos	Letícia	Episode: "A Foto, a Troca e o Furto"
2008	Casos e Acasos	Cristina	Episode: "A Noiva, o Desempregado e o Fiscal"
2008	Casos e Acasos	Andréia	Episode: "A Ciumenta, o Ciumento e o Ciúme"
2009	Cama de Gato	Mariana Batista (Mari)	
2010	As Cariocas	Mrs. Irene	Episode: "A Desinibida do Grajaú"
2011	Insensato Coração	Daysi Damasceno	
2012	Lado a Lado	Célia de Bragança Camargo Guerra (Celinha)	
2013	Malhação Casa Cheia	Vera Toledo	Season 21
2016	Êta Mundo Bom!	Nádia Fragoso	Episodes: "April 22–May 5, 2016"
2016	Tocs de Dalila	Rosinha	Episode: "A Visita de Rosinha"
2018	O Sétimo Guardião	Judith Alvares	
2026	Quem Ama Cuida	Elisa de Moraes	

=== Films ===
- 1976 - Ninguém Segura Essas Mulheres .... Patrícia
- 1988 - Jardim de Alah
- 1998 - Como Ser Solteiro .... Picnic Woman
- 2004 - Home on the Range .... Grace (Brazilian voice dubbing)
- 2006 - O Amigo Invisível
- 2015 - Adelaida .... Sofia (short film)
- 2016 - Minha Fama de Mau - O Filme .... Diva
- 2022 - Atypical Lovers .... Caroline de Souza (Carol)
