= Selva de Pedra (1986 TV series) =

- Genre: Telenovela, Drama, Romance
- Created by: Regina Braga; Eloy Araújo
- Based on: Selva de Pedra by Janete Clair
- Directed by: Walter Avancini; Dennis Carvalho; Daniel Filho
- Starring: Tony Ramos; Christiane Torloni; Fernanda Torres; Sebastião Vasconcelos; Beth Goulart; José Mayer; Miguel Falabella; Maria Zilda Bethlem; Deborah Evelyn
- Opening theme: "Demais" by Verônica Sabino (first episode) "Rock and Roll Lullaby" (instrumental), Freesounds
- Country of origin: Brazil
- Original language: Portuguese
- No. of episodes: 160

Production
- Running time: 50 minutes

Original release
- Network: TV Globo
- Release: 24 February – 22 August 1986

Related
- Roque Santeiro; Roda de Fogo; Selva de Pedra; (original series)

Selva de Pedra is a Brazilian telenovela produced and broadcast by TV Globo. It premiered on 24 February 1986 and ended on 22 August 1986, with a total of 160 episodes. It's the thirty fifth "novela das oito" to be aired on the timeslot. It is an adaptation of the 1972 telenovela of the same name created by Janete Clair and developed by Regina Braga and Eloy Araújo. The remake is directed by Walter Avancini and Dennis Carvalho.

== Plot ==
The plot begins in the fictional town of Duas Barras, in the interior of Rio de Janeiro. Cristiano Vilhena, the son of poor evangelical Sebastião, gets into a fight with playboy Gastão Neves, who provokes him and ends up dead during the fight, the victim of his own knife. The fight is witnessed by the artist Simone Marques who, knowing Cristiano's innocence, covers up for him and ends up becoming amorously involved with him.

Determined to change his life, Cristiano flees to Rio de Janeiro and goes to work for his uncle Aristides Vilhena, owner of the Celmu S.A. shipyard; Simone, thinking about her future as an artist, goes with him. When they get there, the two get married and go to live at the Pensão Palácio, which is run by the amusing Fanny, a former prostitute. There, they meet the rascal Miro, a man of dubious character, who befriends Cristiano and tries to convince him to take advantage of Aristides' kindness in order to climb the ladder and reach a high position in the shipyard. By manipulating him to do this, the pickpocket becomes a kind of “bad conscience” in Cristiano's life.

In the context of his new reality, Cristiano meets the beautiful Fernanda, one of the shipyard's shareholders and engaged to Caio, Cristiano's cousin. With each passing day, he finds himself more involved with her. Completely torn between Simone and Fernanda, Cristiano is pressured by Miro to end his relationship with Simone once and for all, even at the cost of the girl's life, because for Miro, Cristiano and Fernanda's marriage would give him the chance to become one of the shipyard's major shareholders.

Fernanda then leaves Caio to marry Cristiano. Meanwhile, Miro plans to kill Simone, and while chasing her on the highway, Simone suffers a serious accident and is presumed dead. When he hears the news, Cristiano is devastated and, overcome with remorse, fails to marry Fernanda, abandoning her at the altar. She swears revenge on Cristiano and starts hindering him in all his business dealings, becoming increasingly crazy and obsessed with him.

Some time later, Simone, who survived the accident, returns with a new look and using the name of her dead sister, Rosana Reis. At a party, Cristiano recognizes her, but she despises him and blames him for the accident. Meanwhile, Cristiano continues to be accused of Gastão Neves' death, and only Simone can free him from guilt by testifying in his favor in court. However, Miro and Fernanda will do anything to harm the couple.

== Cast ==
| Actor | Character |
|---|---|
| Tony Ramos | Cristiano Vilhena |
| Christiane Torloni | Fernanda Arruda Campos |
| Fernanda Torres | Simone Marques Vilhena / Rosana Reis |
| Sebastião Vasconcelos | Sebastião Vilhena (Sessé) |
| Beth Goulart | Cíntia Vilhena |
| José Mayer | Caio Vilhena |
| Otávio Augusto | Jorge Moreno |
| Tássia Camargo | Joana / Jane |
| Yara Lins | Berenice Vilhena |
| Miguel Falabella | Argemiro Tavares (Miro) |
| Reinaldo Gonzaga | Marcelo |
| Deborah Evelyn | Flávia |
| Paulo Hesse | Isaac |
| Aracy Cardoso | Irene |
| Roberto Bataglin | César |
| Márcia Rodrigues | Madame Katsuki |
| Rogério Márcico | Francisco Marques (Chico) |
| Othon Bastos | Delegado Orestes |
| André Valli | Pipoca |
| Neuza Caribé | Joselina Vilhena (Zelinha) |
| Lisa Vieira | Clarice |
| Vicente Barcelos | Sérgio |
| Odilon Wagner | Joseph |
| Ângela Figueiredo | Beatriz |
| Paulo Pinheiro | Vitório |
| Tânia Loureiro | Olga |
| Regina Macedo | Dona Maria Amélia |
| Betty Gofman | Monique |
| Henri Pagnoncelli | Horácio |
| Juliana Carneiro da Cunha | Walkíria |
| Iara Jamra | Diva Vilhena |
| Guilherme Fontes | Tico |
| Joyce de Oliveira | Thais |
| Sura Berditchevsky | Kátia |
| Paulo Hesse | Issac |
| Jacyra Silva | Marlene |
| Maria Zenaide | Aracy |
| Sérgio Ropperto | Abude |
| Ana Sophia Sarah | Fátima |
| Isabela Reinert | Lucia Rangel |
| Maria Zilda Bethlem | Laura Vilhena |
| Nicette Bruno | Fanny Marlene |
| Marilena Ansaldi | (Vivian Arruda) (Viví) |
| Stênio Garcia | Mestre Pedro |
| Jonas Bloch | Werner |
| Ênio Santos | José Neves |
| Stepan Nercessian | José Ambrósio (Zé) |
| Ana Lúcia Torre | Marta |
| Neusa Borges | Creusa |
| Narjara Turetta | Madalena Ribeiro (Lena) |
| Raul Gazola | Oswaldo |
| Suzana Faini | Dra. Ana |
| Anilza Leoni | Sofia Neves (Ex-vedete) |
| Íris Bruzzi | Arlinda (Ex-vedete) |
| Nélia Paula | Vilma Furacão (Ex-vedete) |
| Virgínia Lane | Nina (Ex-vedete) |
| Irma Alvarez | Sônia (Ex-vedete) |
| Diana Morel | Jandira Sampaio (Ex-vedete) |
| Adriano Reys | Mauro Pillar |
| Miguel Rosemberg | Poli |
| Marcelo Ibrahim | Gastão Neves |
| Lutero Luiz | Padre Jaime |
| Francisco Dantas | Bartolomeu Perez |
| Maria Alves | Janete |
| André Di Mauro | Guido |
| Paulo Villaça | Juiz Carlos Almeida Balbino |
| Paulo Gonçalves | Nando Pápi |
| David Massena | Tonico |
| Sebastião Lemos | Pepe |
| Glória Christal | Teresinha |
