= Te Contei? =

- Genre: Telenovela
- Created by: Cassiano Gabus Mendes
- Directed by: Régis Cardoso; Dennis Carvalho
- Country of origin: Brazil
- Original language: Portuguese
- No. of episodes: 155

Production
- Running time: 40 minutes

Original release
- Network: TV Globo
- Release: 6 March – 1 September 1978

Related
- Sem Lenço, sem Documento; Pecado Rasgado

Te Contei? is a Brazilian telenovela produced and broadcast by TV Globo. It premiered on 6 March 1978 and ended on 1 September 1978, with a total of 155 episodes. It's the twenty first "novela das sete" to be aired at the timeslot. It was created by Cassiano Gabus Mendes and directed by Régis Cardoso with Dennis Carvalho.

== Cast ==
Actor	Character
Wanda Stefânia	Sabrina Bueno
Luis Gustavo	Léo
Maria Cláudia	Shana
Dennis Carvalho	Alexandre Bueno (Alex)
Susana Vieira	Luciana
Mauro Mendonça	Rogério Mendonça
Esther Góes	Adelita Bueno
Ilka Soares	Helena
Hélio Souto	Pedro
Célia Biar	Laura
Reinaldo Gonzaga	Wagner Bueno
Heloísa Millet	Mônica
Fausto Rocha	Jorge
Maria Della Costa	Ana Paula
Eva Todor	Lola
Fernando José	Frederico Bueno (Fred)
Rosita Thomaz Lopes	Hilda Bueno
Suzy Arruda	Magda Leão
Kito Junqueira	João Carlos Mendonça (Joca)
Elizângela	Rita
Osmar Prado	Eduardo (Edu)
Terezinha Sodré	Alice
Ricardo Blat	Tuta
Norma Geraldy	Dona Esther
Brandão Filho	Seu Totó
Dinorah Marzullo	Dona Carmela
Mário Cardoso	Vitório Leão
Leila Cravo	Elisa
Luiz Carlos Niño	Zito
Gláucia Souza	Maria Angélica
