= Alegria, Alegria =

Song by Caetano Veloso

Single by Caetano Veloso

from the album Caetano Veloso
- B-side: "Remelexo"
- Released: 1967
- Genre: Bossa nova, Psychedelic rock, Tropicália
- Label: Phillips
- Songwriter: Caetano Veloso

Caetano Veloso singles chronology
"Samba Em Paz" (1965)	"Alegria, Alegria" (1967)	"Tropicália" (1968)

Alegria, Alegria (Joy, Joy or Happiness, Happiness) is a song written and performed by Caetano Veloso. Often referred to as "the Brazilian anthem of 1967", it later appeared on his influential eponymous 1968 album. At first booed at the 1967 Rede Record festival for its use of electric guitars, Caetano's interpretation and attitude eventually won the audience over. It placed fourth at the festival.

Caetano has called it his "best-known song", comparing it to the Rolling Stones' "(I Can't Get No) Satisfaction" in terms of its place in his oeuvre. He partially based the song's composition on the previous year's winner, Chico Buarque's much more conventional "A Banda", purposely incorporating controversial rock and roll instrumentation – provided by the Paulino band The Beat Boys – to provoke the crowd. Although "alegria" means "joy" or "happiness" in Portuguese, the theme of the song is freedom. Caetano took the title phrase from the popular TV personality Chacrinha, who had in turn borrowed it from singer Wilson Simonal.

The song is, alongside Daniela Mercury's "O Canto da Cidade", remembered by the population for the 1992 Fernando Collor de Mello impeachment. The miniseries Anos Rebeldes – the theme song for which was "Alegria, Alegria" – was a hit at the time, and Caetano's song was sung during public manifestations in favor of impeachment. Fittingly, Mercury later recorded the song for an album celebrating the thirty years of the Tropicália movement.

The song was voted by the Brazilian edition of Rolling Stone as the 10th greatest Brazilian song.
