= Babilônia (TV series) =

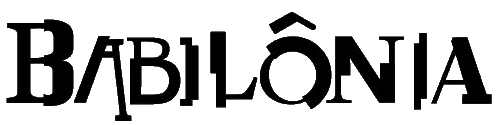
- Genre: Telenovela
- Created by: Gilberto Braga; Ricardo Linhares; João Ximenes Braga
- Directed by: Dennis Carvalho
- Starring: Glória Pires; Adriana Esteves; Camila Pitanga; Thiago Fragoso; Sophie Charlotte; Bruno Gagliasso; Gabriel Braga Nunes; Marcello Melo Jr.; Thiago Martins; Fernanda Montenegro; Nathalia Timberg; Tainá Müller; Marcos Palmeira; Cássio Gabus Mendes; Cláudio Lins; Sheron Menezzes
- Opening theme: "Pra Que Chorar" by Mart'nália
- Country of origin: Brazil
- Original language: Portuguese
- No. of episodes: 143 (110 International version)

Production
- Editors: Paulo Jorge Correia; Cesar Chaves; Alberto Gouveia; Rodrigo Clemente; Patríc Torres; Beatriz Correia
- Camera setup: Multi-camera
- Running time: 50 minutes (approx.)
- Production company: Projac

Original release
- Network: TV Globo
- Release: 16 March – 28 August 2015

Babilônia (Babylon Hill; International title: Ambitious Women) is a Brazilian primetime telenovela produced and broadcast by TV Globo. It premiered on March 16, 2015, replacing Império at 9:10 p.m. / 10:25 p.m. (BRT/AMT).

Written by Gilberto Braga, Ricardo Linhares and João Ximenes Braga, with collaboration of Ângela Carneiro, Chico Soares, Fernando Rebello, João Brandão, Luciana Pessanha, Maria Camargo and Sérgio Marques; and directed by Cristiano Marques, Pedro Peregrino, Luisa Lima, Giovanna Machline, Maria de Médicis and Dennis Carvalho.

Features performances of Camila Pitanga, Thiago Fragoso, Gabriel Braga Nunes, Marcos Palmeira, Fernanda Montenegro, Nathalia Timberg, Cássio Gabus Mendes, Arlete Salles, Tainá Müller, Thiago Martins, Bruno Gissoni, Chay Suede, Sophie Charlotte, Bruno Gagliasso, Adriana Esteves and Glória Pires in the main roles.

With a history considered "bold" by critics, addressing bold themes for the genre, such as homosexuality and racism, has been rejected by the majority of the public. To date, is the smaller audience of a 9PM telenovela in all time, with an average of 27.7 points in the first 10 episodes.

== Plot ==
Once childhood friends, Beatriz (Glória Pires) and Inês (Adriana Esteves) eventually become arch-enemies due to Inês' envy for Beatriz's sudden enrichment. Beatriz married into money to businessman Evandro (Cassio Gabus Mendes) and raised playboy Gustavo (Bruno Gissoni), she gets involved with Cristóvão (Val Perré) and ends up being blackmailed with pictures by Inês. She ends up killing him and framing Inês so that she goes to prison instead of her. After being released, Inês end up in Dubai, United Arab Emirates, along with her husband Homero (Tuca Andrada) and her daughter Alice (Sophie Charlotte).

== Cast ==
Actor	Character
Camila Pitanga	Regina Rocha
Glória Pires	Beatriz Amaral Rangel
Adriana Esteves	Inês Junqueira
Sophie Charlotte	Alice Junqueira
Thiago Fragoso	Vinícius Loureiro
Fernanda Montenegro	Teresa Petrucceli
Nathalia Timberg	Estela Marcondes
Bruno Gagliasso	Murilo Loureiro
Cássio Gabus Mendes	Evandro Souza Rangel
Gabriel Braga Nunes	Luís Fernando Vidal
Marcos Palmeira	Aderbal Pimenta
Bruno Gissoni	Carlos Augusto Lopes Rangel (Guto)
Chay Suede	Rafael Galhardo
Tainá Müller	Cristiana Loureiro (Cris)
Arlete Salles	Consuelo Pimenta
Thiago Martins	Diogo Rocha
Kizi Vaz	Gabriela (Gabi)
Marcos Pasquim	Carlos Alberto da Mata
Sheron Menezzes	Paula Camargo
Dudu Azevedo	Bento Laranjeira
Marcello Mello Jr.	Ivan Camargo
Maria Clara Gueiros	Karen Fonseca Vidal
Juliana Alves	Valeska de Paiva
Herson Capri	Osvaldo Veloso
Carla Salle	Heloísa Gomes Batista (Helô)
Igor Angelkorte	Clóvis Beviláqua
Marcos Veras	Norberto Vidal
Daisy Lúcidi	Dulce Melo
Lu Grimaldi	Olga Loureiro
Rosi Campos	Zélia Fonseca
Luisa Arraes	Laís Matos Pimenta
Virgínia Rosa	Dora da Silva Rocha
Val Perré	Cristóvão Rocha
Laila Garin	Maria José Matos Pimenta
Filipe Ribeiro	Frederico da Mata (Fred)
Tuca Andrada	Homero Junqueira
André Bankoff	Pedro Carvalho
Paulo Verlings	Tom Cruzes
Peter Brandão	Wolnei Toledo de Jesus
Maíra Charken	Vera Morgado
Rodrigo Fagundes	Rubi Palhares
Xande Valois	Joaquim Fonseca Vidal
Bernadete Wilhelm	Nina Fonseca Vidal
Sabrina Nonata	Júlia Rocha Vidal
Bia Arantes	Lara
Rogéria	Úrsula Andressa

== Ratings ==
Timeslot	Episodes	Premiere		Finale		Rank	Season	Rating average
Timeslot	Episodes	Date	Viewers (in points)	Date	Viewers (in points)	Rank	Season	Rating average
Mondays—Saturdays; 9:15pm	143	March 16, 2015	33	August 29, 2015	34	TBA	2015–16	25.45

In his debut, Babilônia has acquired an Ibope Rating of 31 points in the preliminary numbers, representing the worst debut of a 9PM telenovela in all time. However, in the final numbers, this index increased two points, and the debut recorded 33 points, with 50% share. At the same time, Carrossel (SBT - 8 points) and Vitória (Record - 6 points), had a good performance. This represents that 6.534 million viewers watched this chapter in Greater São Paulo. Compared to the two predecessors, the debut index surpassed Império (32 points) and tied with Em Família (33 points).

In the second chapter, recorded 29.8 (30) points, down 9%. Fell short of its predecessor, Império (35 points), but overcame Em Família (29 points). In the third and fourth chapter, the ratings continued to fall, registering 29 points. In the same period, SBT, with a rerun of Carrossel, had a great performance, registering 12.5 and 12.6 respectively.

== Controversy ==
Scene of a gay kiss was received controversially.

The gay kiss between actresses Fernanda Montenegro and Nathalia Timberg was received controversially. Although the telenovela has received numerous accolades for breaking this "taboo", some media outlets pointed that Gilberto Braga, main author of Babilônia, "does not care about the Brazilian family values." After this scene, Babilônia suffered several boycotts by the conservative public, in general, Evangelicals Protestants. Religious leaders publicly criticized the Rede Globo, and invited his followers not to watch the telenovela. The Evangelical Parliamentary Front, headed by João Campos (PSDB), has released a note of repudiation against the scene on March 19, 2015.

Boycott campaign to telenovela. In the poster, says, "Say No! Do not give your ratings to another soap opera created to destroy the values of the Brazilian family!"

"I doubt that, in the United States, they would show two women kissing on TV at 9:30 PM. I doubt it! And there's nothing puritanical about it, because U.S is a democracy. In Brazil, people are mistaking freedom for libertinism."

— Silas Malafaia, in an interview to the newspaper O Dia,

However, Ricardo Linhares, one of the authors, repudiated the criticism, saying: "We live in a secular and democratic country where everyone has the freedom to express your opinion. Who wants to be respected have to respect his fellow man."

"There will be gays in the new novela. There will be gays, many gays. But relax, there will be also very stupid, retrograde and homophobic. Smile, you will feel represented."

— João Ximenes Braga, one of the authors, in an interview to Época, before Babilônia debut,

After the boycott announcement, some fans reacted and launched a campaign in support of the novela.

Due to the controversy, the main competitor of Globo in timeslot, SBT launched on March 21, 2015, a provocative slogan to promote repeat of Chiquititas. The phrase "Novela for family is here!" was used in several advertisements. Although it is an advertising campaign, the station was criticized, mainly because it is, ironically, the first television station in Brazil to showing a gay kiss.

Upon learning of the boycott, Fernanda Montenegro was surprised. In an interview to Veja magazine, said it is all "very radicalized". "It's a witch hunt!" concluded.

== Soundtrack ==
=== Volume 1 ===
Babilônia - Vol. 1

Soundtrack album by Various artists
- Released: 11 May 2015
- Label: Som Livre

Various artists chronology
Babilônia - Vol. 1 (2015)	Babilônia Vol. 2 (2015)

No.	Title	Artist(s)	Length
1.	"Ink"	Coldplay	3:44
2.	"Eu Te Desejo Amor (Que reste-t-il de nos amours)"	Maria Bethânia	2:42
3.	"Ô Sorte"	Mosquito	2:53
4.	"Ilusão a Toa"	Gal Costa	2:56
5.	"Splendor"	Dan Torres	3:39
6.	"Pra Que Chorar"	Mart'nália	2:37
7.	"Deixa Se Envolver"	Melanina Carioca	3:41
8.	"Like Nice"	Celso Fonseca	3:07
9.	"Azul da Cor do Mar"	Tim Maia	3:19
10.	"Sonhos"	Caetano Veloso	3:00
11.	"Don't Wanna Touchdown"	Johnny Glövez Part. Esp.: Polina	4:04
12.	"Não Diga Não"	Nana Caymmi	3:37
13.	"Alvorada"	Cartola	2:38
14.	"Convicted"	Alisha Pillay	3:38
15.	"Till I Forget About You"	CymcoLé	3:36
16.	"A Presença (Instrumental)"	Roger Henri	2:48

=== Volume 2 ===
Babilônia - Vol. 2

Soundtrack album by Various artists
- Released: 15 June 2015
- Length: 53:26
- Label: Som Livre

Various artists chronology
Babilônia Vol. 1 (2015)	Babilônia - Vol. 2 (2015)

No.	Title	Artist(s)	Length
1.	"I'm Not the Only One"	Sam Smith	4:00
2.	"Esperta"	Ana Carolina	2:14
3.	"Mania"	Zizi Possi	5:03
4.	"Estava Escrito"	Ney Matogrosso	3:18
5.	"All of You"	Karina Duque Estrada	2:53
6.	"Um Trem para As Estrelas"	Cazuza	3:37
7.	"Amor Marginal"	Johnny Hooker	4:46
8.	"O Samba de Nós Dois"	Daniel Chaudon Part. Mart'nália	4:17
9.	"I'm Alive"	Mister Jam Part. Francinne	3:21
10.	"Tango do Mal"	Simone Mazzer	3:00
11.	"Sabe Você?"	Leila Pinheiro	4:27
12.	"Love Is on My Mind"	Blushed	3:47
13.	"Que Bandeira"	Daúde Candeal	3:45
14.	"Only U"	Leo Von	3:37
15.	"Amor, Meu Grande Amor"	Lucas Santtana	3:59
Total length:			53:26
