= Anos Rebeldes =

Brazilian telenovela

- Genre: Drama; Romance
- Created by: Gilberto Braga
- Based on: 1968: o Ano Que não Terminou by: Zuenir Ventura; Os Carbonários; by Alfredo Sirkis
- Directed by: Dennis Carvalho
- Starring: Malu Mader; Cássio Gabus Mendes; Cláudia Abreu; Marcelo Serrado; Pedro Cardoso; José Wilker; Betty Lago; Kadu Moliterno
- Opening theme: "Alegria, Alegria" by Caetano Veloso
- Country of origin: Brazil
- Original language: Portuguese
- No. of episodes: 20

Production
- Running time: 40 minutes

Original release
- Network: TV Globo
- Release: 14 July – 14 August 1992

Anos Rebeldes (Rebel Years) is a Brazilian television series which first aired on the Brazilian television Rede Globo on July 14, 1992. It was the first serial drama to highlight themes and stories of political violence and the repressed who were under the military regime. There are many themes that were first introduced to Brazilian television with this show including themes of censorship, cultural memory, and torture. This television program was set in the authoritarian regime of the 1960s and portrayed the time period through the lives of a group of high school students who had to come of age in this era. This group of students are friends who all go to the college Pedro II in 1964. The show focuses on João, and Maria Lúcia, two lovers whose opposite political views cause an ongoing struggle between identity and love. João, an idealist, eventually joins the armed struggle, while Maria Lúcia is an individualist who has little tolerance for the risks attached to the leftist social fight against the dictator's regime.

== Characters ==
- João Alfredo - Cássio Gabus Mendes: The romantic interest of Maria Lúcia, and an idealist involved with the left-wing-opposition in the arms based struggles. He is based on the 1980 Green Party president, Alfredo Sirkis, author of Carbonários a memoir in which Anos Rebeldes is based. He is also the leader in their group of friends and comes from a middle-class family. His family is against political participation and fight against the regime, as well as his love, creating both tension and separation.
- Maria Lúcia - Malu Mader: Though she is apolitical, Maria strongly believes that people still should have morally based obligations. However, she avoids political based participation because she fears the risks and consequences it may involve. It is also important to note that her father is a well-known left journalist and writer. With her family tied with the left, she has experience that causes her to be wary about strong politically based ties. This causes much division and confusion with her love interest João.
- Edgar - Marcelo Serrado: Maria's other love interest who thus becomes João's enemy.
- Heloísa - Cláudia Abreu: Considered to have changed from the rich, compliant daughter of Fábio Andrade Brito, to a strong opponent of the regime, and tied to the militants, she worked with the armed struggle and is both arrested and tortured for the activities she participates in.
- Fábio Andrade Brito - José Wilker: Father of Heloísa, a powerful wealthy businessman who supports the regime.
- Avelar - Kadu Moliterno: Is the high school history teacher who teaches in a more leftist-based, socialist approach. He is very supportive of the students and carries integrity and courage, and stands as a message that "everyone has to know what is going on" and that history must be told to "never happen again".
- Galeano - Pedro Cardoso: is a television writer and among João's group of friends. He fights to have a script produced based on slavery, which is based on a similar experience in 1976 of Braga, one of the show's scriptwriters.

Other Characters include:

- Natalie - Betty Lake
- Yone - Maria Lucia Dahl
- Queiros - Carlos Zara
- Xavier - Welcome Sequeira
- Captain Rangel - Roberto Pirilo
- Idalina - Fatima Freire
- Regina - Mila Moreira
- Valquiria - Norma Blum
- Abelardo - Ivan Candido
- Marta - Lourdes Mayer
- Teobaldo Damasceno - Castro Gonzaga
- Carmen - Bete Mendes
- Orlando Daniels - Geraldo Del Rey
- Lavinia - Paula Newlands
- Waldir - Andrew Pimentel

== History of the Brazilian Military Regime and Rede Globo ==
Following the coup d'état of the Brazilian Armed Forces over left-wing President João Goulart in 1964, Brazil was governed by a military dictatorship until 1985. The authoritarian regime justified its actions throughout the time period by arguing that they were operating under the need to promote National Security. Rede Globo, the popular Brazilian television network launched in 1965, was a staunch supporter of the authoritarian military regime in Brazil during its first two decades of existence. Globo backed the regime while censoring information about the tortures, murders, and "disappearances" that were taking place under the administration. Roberto Marinho, Globo's founder, justified this censorship by arguing that it was "a good thing when it comes to [fighting] terrorism". Although Globo generally praised the regime, Globo hired writers who were outspoken in their opposition to the government and Marinho himself came out against the regime on occasion. Nonetheless, Globo's allegiance to the military governments allowed them to conduct an illegal joint business opportunity with the Time-Life Corporation, which provided them with financial benefits and advantages over other networks. The network's close ties to the generals also gave Globo special consideration during the allocation of licenses and advertising deals that were funded by the state. After the military gave up control of the government in 1985, Globo had seemingly created a monopoly over the Brazilian television industry. To this day it is regarded as the chief television network in Brazil in terms of audience ratings and revenues generated from advertisements. In 1992, Globo became the first Brazilian television network to condemn the military dictatorship on prime-time television with the advent of "Anos Rebeldes".

== Cultural significance and purpose ==
The show was very popular, with over 30 million viewers tuning in to watch the telenovela. The show inspired young revolutionaries and the youth protest movement that sought to impeach Fernando Collor de Mello. Rebecca J. Atencio, author of A Prime Time to Remember, argues that Globo marketed the show to viewers by using "social" and "memory merchandising". According to Atencio, the network used the show to promote messages and issues (as opposed to commercial products) in order to bolster its public image, a process she refers to as social merchandising. The network also participated in memory merchandising by including historical and documentary aspects during scenes. Gilberto Braga, the creator and head scriptwriter of the show, created the show "as a vehicle for promoting the memory of the authoritarian period so as not to repeat it". Atencio also notes that some characters, such as Heloísa, serve as memory agents. Heloísa, though not a lead character, became a fan favorite after she made the transition from a pampered girl to a militant woman. She is the only character that is tortured in the show and thus serves to represent victims of torture and enables the show to advocate a pro-human rights message.
