= Nildo Parente =

Brazilian actor

- Born: 18 September 1934; Fortaleza, Ceará, Brazil
- Died: 31 January 2011 (aged 76–77); Rio de Janeiro, Rio de Janeiro, Brazil
- Occupation: Actor
- Years active: 1962–2010

Nildo Parente (18 September 1934 – 31 January 2011) was a Brazilian film actor. He appeared in 60 films between 1962 and 2010. Parente died on 31 January 2011, in Rio de Janeiro, due to a stroke.

== Selected filmography ==
- O 5º Poder (1962)
- O Homem Que Comprou o Mundo (1968)
- Tempo de Violência (1969)
- O Homem das Estrelas (1970)
- The Alienist (1970) – Father Simão Bacamarte
- Anjos e Demônios (1970)
- O Doce Esporte do Sexo (1971) – (segment "O Torneio")
- Mãos Vazias (1971)
- Jardim de Espumas (1971)
- S. Bernardo (1972) – Padilha
- Quem é Beta? (1973)
- Um Homem Célebre (1974)
- Onanias o Poderoso Machão (1974)
- Essas Mulheres Lindas, Nuas e Maravilhosas (1974)
- Os Condenados (1975)
- Ipanema, Adeus (1975)
- Nem Os Bruxos Escapam (1975)
- Padre Cícero (1976)
- Tenda dos Milagres (1977) – Prof. Nilo Argolo
- O Seminarista (1977)
- Ajuricaba, o Rebelde da Amazônia (1977)
- Se Segura, Malandro! (1978)
- Batalha dos Guararapes (1978) – General Von Schkoppe
- Pequenas Taras (1978)
- Colonel Delmiro Gouveia (1978)
- Terror e Êxtase (1979)
- O Princípio do Prazer (1979)
- O Coronel e o Lobisomem (1979)
- Eu Matei Lúcio Flávio (1979)
- Parceiros da Aventura (1980) – Diretor da gravadora
- Giselle (1982) – Luccini
- Cabaret Mineiro (1980)
- Fruto do Amor (1981)
- Luz del Fuego (1982) – Delgado
- Tensão no Rio (1982)
- Rio Babilônia (1982)
- Gabriela, Cravo e Canela (1983) – Maurício Caires
- Águia na Cabeça (1984)
- Memoirs of Prison (1984) – Emanuel
- Para Viver um Grande Amor (1984)
- Amor Maldito (1984)
- Kiss of the Spider Woman (1985) – Leader of Resistance
- Leila Diniz (1987)
- Moon over Parador (1988) – Gray Man
- Natal da Portela (1988)
- Xuxa e os Trapalhões em o Mistério de Robin Hood (1990)
- Kickboxer 3 (1992) – Vargas
- A Viagem (1994, TV Series) – Waldomiro (Alexandre's killer)
- Quatro por Quatro (1995, TV Series) – Juiz
- Malhação (1997, TV Series) – Severo
- Bela Donna (1998) – Padre Jorge
- Um Crime Nobre (2001)
- Que sera, sera (2002) – Delegado carioca
- Celebridade (2003–2004, TV Series) – Wanderley Mourão
- América (2005, TV Series) – Médico
- Brasília 18% (2006) – Gonçalves Dias
- Inesquecível (2007) – Padre
- Cleopatra (2007) – Roman Senator
- Meu Nome é Dindi (2007) – Palhaço Alegria
- Paraíso Tropical (2007, TV Series) – Pacífico
- Chico Xavier (2010) – Juiz (final film role)
