= Yara Cortes =

Brazilian actress

- Born: Odete Cipriano Serpa; September 22, 1921; Rio de Janeiro, Brazil
- Died: October 17, 2002 (aged 81); Rio de Janeiro, Brazil
- Occupation: Actress
- Years active: 1938–1999

Odete Cipriano Serpa, better known as Yara Cortes (September 22, 1921 – October 17, 2002) was a Brazilian actress.
