= Joana Fomm =

Brazilian actress (born 1939)

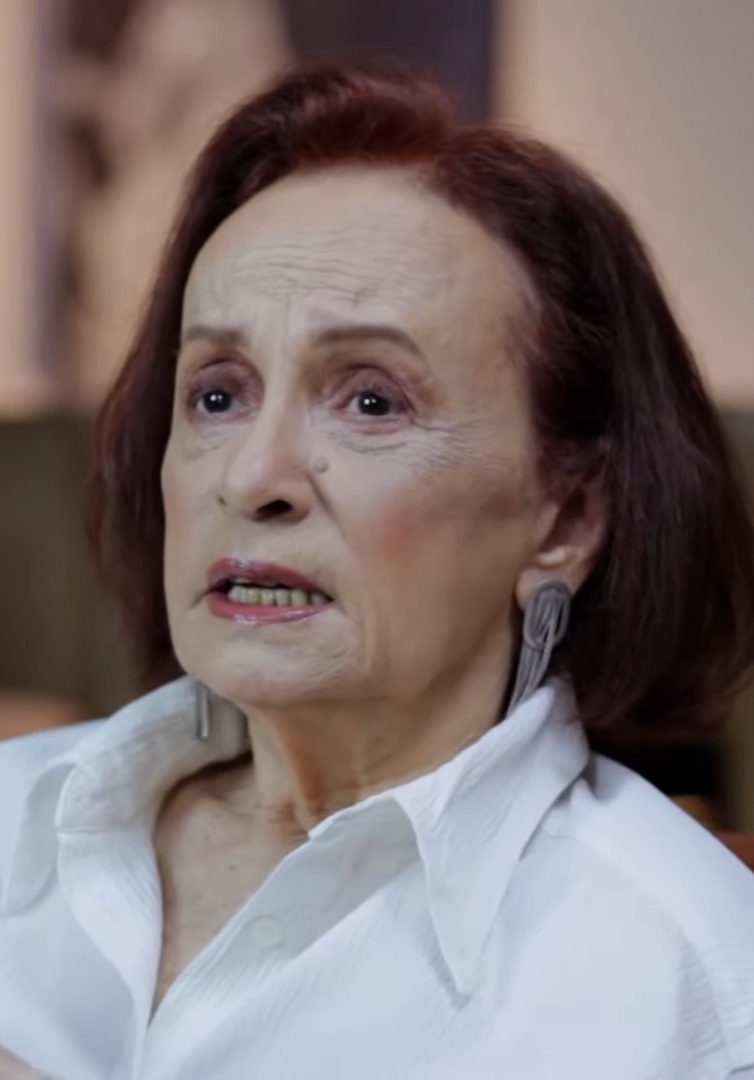
- Fomm in 2019
- Born: September 14, 1939 (age 85); Belo Horizonte, Minas Gerais, Brazil
- Occupation: Actress
- Years active: 1964–present
- Spouse: Francisco Milani (m. 1959; sep. 1961)
- Partner(s): Nelson Xavier (1964–1966); Astolfo Araújo (1969–1971); Ricardo Gouveia (1973–1983)
- Children: 1

Joana Maria Fomm (born September 14, 1939) is a Brazilian actress.

== Biography ==
Joana Fomm was born in Belo Horizonte, but her mother died when she was still a baby and she was adopted by her uncles in Rio de Janeiro.

== Career ==
Joana began her acting career at the Teatro Municipal in Rio de Janeiro in 1961, while still a student at Escola de Arte Dramática Martins Pena. She debuted in film in 1962 in O Quinto Poder by Alberto Pieralisi. In 1964, she made her first television appearance on TV Rio in the telenovela O Desconhecido, written by Nelson Rodrigues.

She won the APCA Award for Best Actress in Television in 1978, and the Candango for Best Actress in 1990.

== Selected television ==
- Magnifica 70 (2015–16)
