= Fúlvio Stefanini =

Brazilian actor

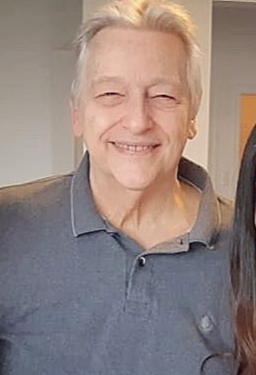
- Stefanini in 2018
- Born: October 12, 1939 (age 87); São Paulo, São Paulo, Brazil
- Occupation: Actor
- Years active: 1955–present
- Awards: List

Fúlvio Stefanini (October 12, 1939) is a Brazilian actor. He is known for his long career as a soap opera actor on TV Globo.

== Biography ==
The son of Italian immigrants, Oreste and Agnese Stefanini, he was born in the city of São Paulo in 1939. At age 15, he dropped out of school and went to look for the Escola de Arte Dramática, affiliated with the University of São Paulo (USP). To enroll in the university, you had to be 18. “I did the math: three years until I turned 18, then another four years of school—that’s seven years before I could start?” It would take too long. So, I asked to audition at TV Tupi. At the time, Cassiano Gabus Mendes was the artistic director. I started in 1955, just as an extra, learning from the more experienced professionals.” He worked at the TV station for three years as an extra.

His first television role came in 1955, on TV Tupi’s program TV de Vanguarda, which aired television dramas. In his debut, he starred in Crime and Punishment, based on the novel by the Russian author Fyodor Dostoevsky. The following year, he made his film debut in Absolutamente Certo, in which he had a small role in a film starring Dercy Gonçalves and Anselmo Duarte. He continued working at TV Tupi until 1964, when he moved to TV Excelsior, where he starred in the soap opera Melodia Fatal. He worked at the network until 1968; his last soap opera there was Os Tigres, written by Marcos Rey. That same year, he moved to TV Record. Her first soap opera on the network was A Última Testemunha, starring Susana Vieira, written by Benedito Ruy Barbosa.

After making a few brief appearances on the Rio de Janeiro-based network TV Globo in 1973, he made his debut in his first soap opera for the network, Carinhoso. In the soap opera, there was a lonely architect who had separated from his wife and ended up falling in love with a secretary at the company where he worked, played by Rosamaria Murtinho. At the network, she appeared in soap operas such as Gabriela, Pátria Minha, Suave Veneno, and Porto dos Milagres, as well as series such as Tarcísio & Glória, Os Normais and Você Decide.

In 2003, he began a collaboration with writer Walcyr Carrasco, working on several of the author’s soap operas. Fúlvio was part of the cast of Chocolate com Pimenta, Alma Gêmea, Caras & Bocas, and Amor à Vida. As a result of this partnership in 2005, he won the APCA Television Award for Best Actor in Television for his portrayal of Osvaldo Santini in Alma Gêmea. His last role on TV Globo was in Amor à Vida. In 2015, he appeared in the series Questão de Família, which aired on the GNT cable channel, and in 2018, in the Space channel series Pacto de Sangue.

Having stepped away from television, he has been performing in Florian Zeller’s play The Father since 2016, in which he plays André, a friendly, funny, and grumpy 80-year-old man whose memory is beginning to fail due to old age. The play has been performed more than 200 times and seen by more than 80,000 audience members.

== Filmography ==
=== Television ===
Year	Title	Character	Note(s)	TV Station	Ref.
1955	TV de Vanguarda	Various characters	Episode: "Louisa"	Rede Tupi	
1956	TV de Vanguarda	Various characters	Episode: "O Regenerado"	Rede Tupi	
1956	TV de Vanguarda	Various characters	Episode: "Louisa"	Rede Tupi	
1957	TV de Vanguarda	Various characters	Episode: "Tensão em Shangay"	Rede Tupi	
1957	TV de Vanguarda	Various characters	Episode: "Volta Mocidade"	Rede Tupi	
1957	TV de Vanguarda	Various characters	Episode: "Pacto Sinistro"	Rede Tupi	
1961	O Vigilante Rodoviário	Portuga	Episode: "Zuni, O Potrinho"	Rede Tupi	
1962	O Vigilante Rodoviário	Playboy Casper	Episode: "O Repórter"	Rede Tupi	
1964	Melodia Fatal	Leandro		TV Excelsior	
1964	A Outra Face de Anita	Dr. Artur		TV Excelsior	
1965	A Indomável	Alberto		TV Excelsior	
1965	Em Busca da Felicidade	Salvador		TV Excelsior	
1965	A Grande Viagem	Sérgio		TV Excelsior	
1967	Os Galãs Atacam de Madrugada	Gustavo		TV Excelsior	
1967	As Minas de Prata	Estácio		TV Excelsior	
1968	Os Tigres	Nando		TV Record	
1968	A Última Testemunha	Geraldo		TV Record	
1969	Algemas de Ouro	Moacir		TV Record	
1970	As Pupilas do Senhor Reitor	Pedro das Dornas		TV Record	
1971	Os Deuses Estão Mortos	Leonardo		TV Record	
1971	Quarenta Anos Depois	Leonardo		TV Record	
1972	Bel-Ami	Manoel Carlos		Rede Tupi	
1973	Caso Especial	Cláudio	Episode: "O Demônio da Alma	TV Globo	
1973	Cavalo de Aço	Agente federal	Special guest	TV Globo	
1973	Carinhoso	Sérgio Garcia		TV Globo	
1974	Fogo sobre Terra	Gustavo de Almeida		TV Globo	
1975	Gabriela	Antônio Ramiro Bastos (Tonico Bastos)		TV Globo	
1976	Planeta dos Homens	Paquerador	Skecth: "Rei das Viúvas"	TV Globo	
1978	Roda de Fogo	Edmundo		Rede Tupi	
1979	Cara a Cara	Eduardo Gonçalves (Dudu)		Rede Bandeirantes	
1979	O Todo Poderoso	Marcelo		Rede Bandeirantes	
1980	Cavalo Amarelo	Teo Maldonado		Rede Bandeirantes	
1981	Os Imigrantes	Prof. Amadeu		Rede Bandeirantes	
1982	Renúncia	Cirilo Davemport		Rede Bandeirantes	
1982	O Tronco do Ipê	Barão de Vilaverde		TV Cultura	
1983	Campeão	Charles Spencer		Rede Bandeirantes	
1983	Eu Prometo	João Carlos de Sá (Joca)		TV Globo	
1985	Um Sonho a Mais	Orlando Aranha		TV Globo	
1988	Tarcísio & Glória	Julinho Lauriano	Episode: "Um Banho de Loja"	TV Globo	
1990	Brasileiras e Brasileiros	Ângelo Minotauro		SBT	
1994	Pátria Minha	Rafael Novaes	Episodes: "18–31 de julho"	TV Globo	
1996	Razão de Viver	Delegado Renato Bragança		SBT	
1998	Estrela de Fogo	Gustavo Alvarenga		TV Record	
1999	Suave Veneno	Marcelo Barone / João Pedro Botelho		TV Globo	
2000	Você Decide	Murilo	Episode: "A Mãe Preta"	TV Globo	
2000	Você Decide	Cordeiro	Episode: "Glorinha Vai às Compras"	TV Globo	
2001	Porto dos Milagres	Oswaldo de Assunção		TV Globo	
2001	Os Normais	Tony	Episode: "Seguir a Tradição é Normal"	TV Globo	
2002	Os Normais	Detetive Lacerda	Episode "Umas Loucuras Normais"	TV Globo	
2003	Chocolate com Pimenta	Prefeito Vivaldo Albuquerque		TV Globo	
2005	Alma Gêmea	Osvaldo Santini		TV Globo	
2006	Pé na Jaca	Dr. Último Botelho Bulhões		TV Globo	
2007	Duas Caras	Waldemar Nascimento	Episodes: "1–2 de outubro"	TV Globo	
2007	O Segredo da Princesa Lili	Arthur	Year-End Special	TV Globo	
2008	Faça Sua História	Cornélio	Episode: "Um Cadáver Ilustre"	TV Globo	
2008	Casos e Acasos	Olavo	Episode: "O Parto"	TV Globo	
2008	Casos e Acasos	Nestor	Episode: "A Garota"	TV Globo	
2008	Xuxa e as Noviças	Frei Caneco	Year-End Special	TV Globo	
2009	Caras & Bocas	Frederico Foster		TV Globo	
2010	Na Forma da Lei	Adílson Cerqueira	Episode: "Não Matarás"	TV Globo	
2011	Amor em Quatro Atos	Assediador de Vera	Episode: "Folhetim"	TV Globo	
2011	Homens de Bem	Ricardo	Year-End Special	TV Globo	
2012	A Grande Família	Silas	Episode: "O Infiltrado"	TV Globo	
2013	Amor à Vida	Denizard Trajano Araújo		TV Globo	
2015	Questão de Família	Juiz Cássio Jordão		GNT	
2018	Pacto de Sangue	Simão		Space	

=== Cinema ===
Year	Title	Character	Note(s)	Ref.
1957	Absolutamente Certo			
1978	O Bem Dotado, o Homem de Itu	Janjão		
1982	Retrato Falado de uma Mulher sem Pudor	José Roldão		
1988	Quincas Borba	Cristino Palha		
2004	Pelé Eterno		Narrator; Documentary	
2005	Eliana em o Segredo dos Golfinhos	Esquivel		
2006	Boleiros 2 - Vencedores e Vencidos	Dr. Naum		
2007	Caixa Dois	Luiz Fernando		
2009	Cabeça a Prêmio	Waldomiro (Miro)		
2011	Cilada.com	Leoni		
2016	De Onde Eu Te Vejo	Hélio		
2019	Chorar de Rir	Tony		
2026	Os Corretores	Alaor		

== Awards and nominations ==
Year	Award	Category	Nominated work	Result	Ref.
1964	Troféu Imprensa	Best New Male Actor	A Outra Face de Anita	Won	
2005	APCA Television Award	Best Actor	Alma Gêmea	Won	
2009	Rio de Janeiro International Film Festival	Best Actor – Honorable Mention	Cabeça a Prêmio	Won	
2023	Bibi Ferreira Prize	Best Actor	O Pai	Won	

== Personal life ==
He has been married to Vera Stefanini since 1968, and they have two sons, Fúlvio and Leonardo. He's a SE Palmeiras fan.

In 2020, he ended up in the Intensive care unit (ICU), where he was hospitalized for four days following staphylococcus aureus a bacterial skin infection. In March 2026, he contracted a bacterial infection, which forced him to cancel some theater performances.
