= Murilo Galdino =

Brazilian politician (born 1980)

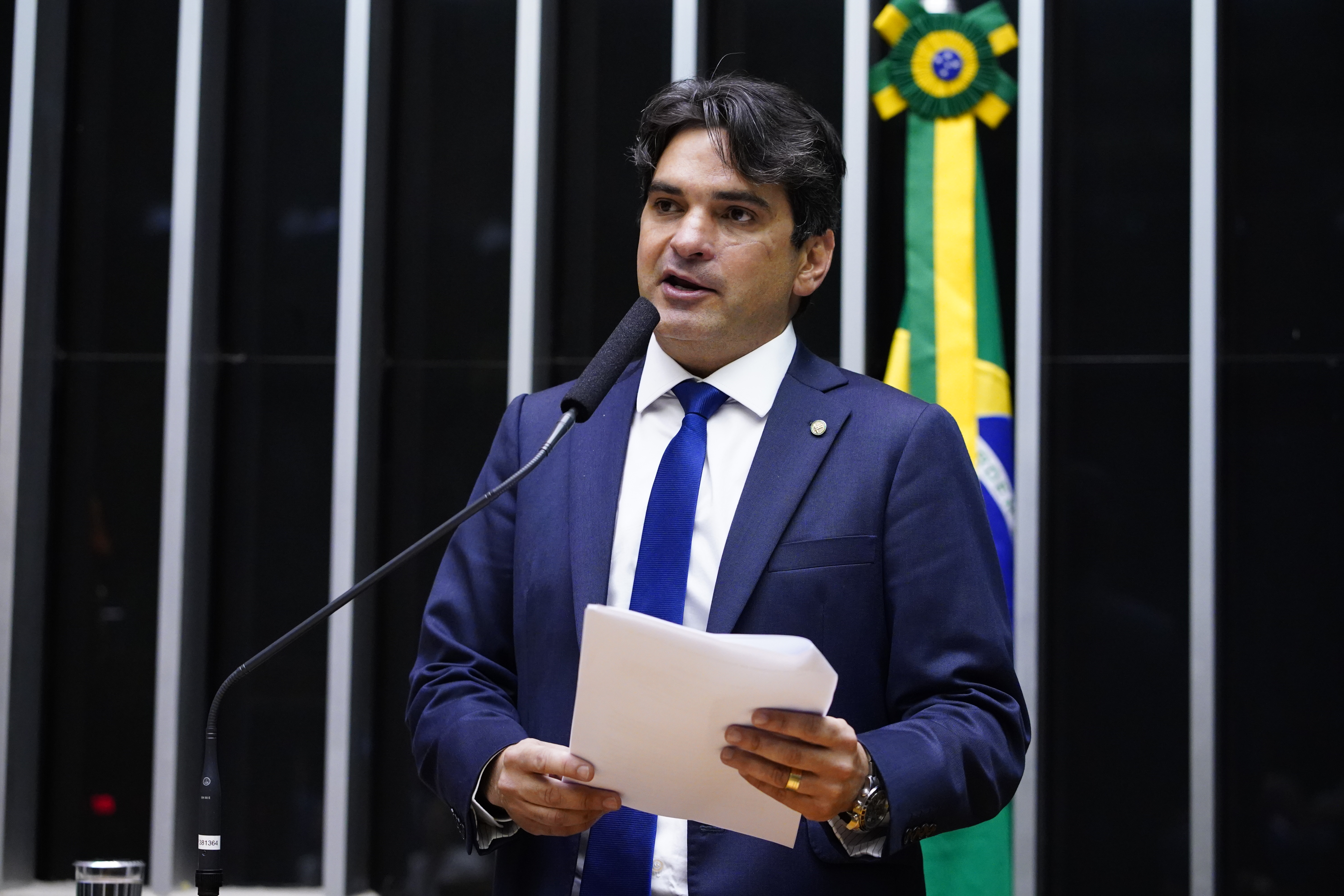
- Galdino in 2023

Member of the Chamber of Deputies
- Incumbent
- Assumed office 1 February 2023
- Constituency: Paraíba

Member of the Municipal Chamber of Campina Grande
- In office 1 January 2013 – 1 January 2017
- Constituency: At-large

Personal details
- Born: Cássio Murilo Galdino de Araújo; 2 July 1980 (age 46) Pocinhos, Paraíba, Brazil
- Party: Republicanos (since 2022)
- Other political affiliations: PSDB (2003–2011); PSB (2011–2020); Cidadania (2020–2022)

Cássio Murilo Galdino de Araújo (born 2 July 1980) is a Brazilian politician serving as a member of the Chamber of Deputies since 2023. He is the brother of Adriano Galdino.
