= Cuca Legal =

- Genre: Telenovela
- Created by: Marcos Rey
- Based on: Boeing Boeing, by Marc Camoletti
- Directed by: Gonzaga Blota; Oswaldo Loureiro; Jardel Mello
- Starring: Francisco Cuoco; Yoná Magalhães; Suely Franco; Françoise Forton; Juca de Oliveira; Hugo Carvana; Rosamaria Murtinho; Elza Gomes; Mário Lago; Sebastião Vasconcelos
- Opening theme: "Cuca Legal, Ha Ha Ha", Chico Batera
- Country of origin: Brazil
- Original language: Portuguese
- No. of episodes: 119

Production
- Running time: 45 minutes

Original release
- Network: TV Globo
- Release: 27 January – 13 June 1975

Cuca Legal is a Brazilian telenovela produced and broadcast by TV Globo. It premiered on 27 January 1975 and ended on 13 June 1975, with a total of 119 episodes. It's the fifteenth "novela das sete" to be aired at the timeslot. It is created by Marcos Rey, directed by Gonzaga Blota, Oswaldo Loureiro and Jardel Mello.

== Plot ==
Set in Rio de Janeiro, the plot revolves around Mário Barroso (Francisco Cuoco), a bachelor airline pilot who is in love with three women from different social classes: Fátima (Yoná Magalhães), Irene (Suely Franco) and Virgínia (Françoise Forton). Although he believes he loves all three of them with the same intensity, Mário can't decide which woman would be able to give him a child with a cool head. Successful in his profession but emotionally insecure, he still lives with his mother, Dalva (Elza Gomes), and spends his spare time at bar tables with his bosom friend Jacaré (Hugo Carvana), a typical good-humored carioca.

To get out of the trouble he keeps getting into, Mário relies on the help of his mother, his best advisor. In fact, for over ten years, Dalva has been a sentimental counselor and astrologer on a radio show she hosts under the pseudonym Madame Zaíde. At home, she is always in the company of her old friend Aureliano Villaça (Mário Lago), a gentleman who dresses and behaves as if he were still in the 1930s, making constant references to idols and scenes from the past. The two friends have a platonic love for each other.

Fátima is the poor widow of a maintenance worker at the aviation company where Mário works. She lives with her sister, housewife Diva (Suzana Faini), who is married to Albano (Ruy Rezende), a moralistic, unemployed man who spends all his free time on the beach. Fátima was also the first love of the determined advertising executive Diego Pappalardo (Juca de Oliveira), who is determined to win her back and get his rival Mário out of the way. Diego lives with his brother, the jealous lawyer Franco Pappalardo (Rogério Fróes), who is married to Elizabeth (Lady Francisco), known professionally as Berta Lammar, a circus actress who has been away from the stage and obsessively dreams of returning to it. Her trademark is her extravagant way of dressing.

The other suitor is Irene, a middle-class girl. Dreamy and naive, Irene gives private piano lessons to make up for the frustration of not having become a professional pianist. She is the daughter of José Aprígio Proença (Felipe Carone), a former scoutmaster obsessed with promoting discipline in every aspect of daily life, starting with the organization of domestic life. He torments his wife, Alba (Miriam Pires), with his neurotic demands, which she accepts without complaint, more concerned about the headaches caused by their youngest child, Maria Lúcia, Lu (Elizângela), a lively and irresponsible young woman. José also houses his sister Nilzete (Dorinha Duval), a fun seamstress. Raquel (Chica Xavier) is another character who complies with José's demands. Sweet and understanding, she has been the family's maid for years and, having helped raise her boss's daughters, is Irene and Lu's greatest confidante.

And finally, Virgínia Viana, a rich young businesswoman obsessed with the direction of her late father's business. She lives in a beautiful mansion with her mother, the widowed and “destitute” Joaquina, also known as Kinu (Rosamaria Murtinho), who later becomes involved with Mário, her daughter's suitor. Kinu is also the mother of Dennis (Mário Cardoso), a young adventurer who is engaged to the snobbish Elaine (Fátima Freire), daughter of Nestor Dias (Sebastião Vasconcelos), a wealthy industrialist who is in love with Kinu.

== Cast ==
Actor	Character
Francisco Cuoco	Mário Barroso
Yoná Magalhães	Fátima
Suely Franco	Irene Proença
Françoise Forton	Virgínia Viana
Juca de Oliveira	Diego Pappalardo
Hugo Carvana	Celso Maranhão (Jacaré)
Rosamaria Murtinho	Joaquina Viana (Kinu)
Sebastião Vasconcelos	Nestor Dias
Elza Gomes	Dalva Barroso / Madame Zaíde
Mário Lago	Aureliano Villaça
Suzana Faini	Diva
Ruy Rezende	Albano
Elizângela	Maria Lúcia Proença (Lú)
Luiz Armando Queiroz	Cláudio
Felipe Carone	José Aprígio Proença
Miriam Pires	Alba Proença
Rogério Fróes	Franco Pappalardo
Lady Francisco	Elizabeth Pappalardo / Berta Lammar
Dorinha Duval	Nilzete Proença
Herval Rossano	Fausto
Chica Xavier	Raquel
Mário Cardoso	Dennis Viana
Fátima Freire	Elaine Dias
Dary Reis	Durval
Cleyde Blota	Beatriz
Edson Silva	Villaboim
Luiz Magnelli	Edgar Brandão
Vinícius Salvatori	Ivo
Pedro Farah	Gente-Fina
