= Saramandaia =

Saramandaia may refer to either of two Brazilian telenovelas produced and aired by Rede Globo:

- Saramandaia (1976 TV series)
- Saramandaia (2013 TV series)
