= Sebastião Vasconcelos =

Brazilian actor and lawyer

- Born: Sebastião Vasconcelos Costa; 21 May 1927; Pocinhos, Paraíba, Brazil
- Died: 15 July 2013 (aged 86); Rio de Janeiro, Brazil
- Occupation: Actor
- Years active: 1949–2009
- Spouse: Vilma Guisser Costa (m. 1958; death 2013)

Sebastião Vasconcelos Costa (May 21, 1927 – July 15, 2013) was a Brazilian actor and lawyer. He had a career spanning more than forty years in Brazilian television.

== Biography ==
=== Early years and education ===
He was born in the city of Pocinhos, in the interior of the state of Paraíba, in 1927. He moved to Recife, the capital of Pernambuco, and enrolled in the law program at the Federal University of Pernambuco (UFPE). During college years, he participated in the founding of the University Theater and acted in six plays and at the Pernambuco Amateur Theater, where he performed in ten plays directed by big names in Brazilian theater such as Graça Mello, Ziembinski, and Gianni Ratto. At that time, he even used the pseudonym Paulo Alcântara, as his parents did not approve of his idea of becoming an actor.

After graduating, he moved to Rio de Janeiro, where he joined the Tônia-Celi-Autran theater company, moving into television in the late 1950s.

=== Career ===
In 1959, he participated in the filming of Carla Civelli's movie Um Caso de Polícia, which was never commercially released. That same year, he made his television debut, participating in the first adaptation of Ribeiro Couto's novel Cabocla, in which he played the lead role, with Glauce Rocha as his romantic partner, broadcast by TV Rio.

In 1966, he made his debut on Rede Globo, beginning his career with the soap opera O Sheik de Agadir, by Glória Magadan. Due to disagreements with director Daniel Filho, he left television in the early 1970s, returning permanently to the Rio de Janeiro station in 1975.

For four decades, he played a variety of characters in TV Globo, mostly gruff men with strong personalities, such as Colonel Tenório Tavares in Saramandaia, the religious Sessé Vilhena in Selva de Pedra, the petty Zé Esteves in Tieta, the long-suffering João do Piano in Felicidade, the humble fisherman Floriano, father of twins Ruth and Raquel, in Mulheres de Areia and the troublesome Arab Tio Abdul in O Clone. He also worked on soap operas such as Vale Tudo and História de Amor. His last work on TV Globo was the second version of Cabocla, a soap opera that marked Vasconcelos' debut on television.

In 2006, he participated in the play Leitor por Horas, by José Sanchis Sinisterra, directed by Christiane Jatahy, where he acted alongside Kiko Mascarenhas and Ana Beatriz Nogueira at Sesc on Paulista Avenue. In 2007, he moved to TV Record, where he works on the soap opera Caminhos do Coração.

== Death ==
With no more job offers coming in, Vasconcelos began to suffer from depression, which further weakened his health. Refusing to take medication and eat, in April 2013, after collapsing, he was admitted to Copa d'Or Hospital in the Copacabana neighborhood, and then transferred to Albert Sabin Israeli Hospital in Tijuca, where he remained until early June, when he was released to continue his treatment at home. However, on the 30th, he was readmitted to the hospital.

Vasconcelos died on July 15, 2013, from septic shock and cardiac arrest, and his body was cremated two days later at the Caju Cemetery in Rio de Janeiro in a ceremony restricted to family and friends.

=== Legacy ===
A street in his hometown, Pocinhos, was named after him following a bill presented by councilman Henrique Herminío de Albuquerque (Avante) and signed into law by mayor Eliane Galdino (Avante).

On December 10, 2024, a theater was inaugurated in Pocinhos, Paraíba, named after the actor, the Sebastião Vasconcelos Municipal Theater, also during Giardini's term of office. The inauguration of the theater was attended by several authorities and two relatives of the late actor.

== Personal life ==
He had been married to Vilma Guisser Costa since 1959, and they had two children together.

== Filmography ==
=== Television ===
Year	Title	Role	Notes	Network
1959	Cabocla	Luís Jerônimo Vieira Pires		TV Rio
1966	O Sheik de Agadir	Jean Amtullah		Rede Globo
1967	A Rainha Louca			Rede Globo
1971	Bandeira 2	Severino de Jesus Barbosa		Rede Globo
1971–72	Um Novo Tempo	Himself		Rede Globo
1972	Tempo de Viver	Quinca Castro da Silva		Rede Tupi
1974	Caso Especial	Severino Pedro da Silva	Episode: "Boas Festas e Feliz Natal"	Rede Globo
1975	Cuca Legal	Nestor Dias Aragão		Rede Globo
1975	O Grito	Francisco Machado Lins		Rede Globo
1976	Saramandaia	Tenório Tavares		Rede Globo
1977	Sem Lenço, sem Documento	Nilo Trindade Sodré		Rede Globo
1981	Morte e Vida Severina	Lorival Carpina (Priest Carpina)		Rede Globo
1981	Terras do Sem-Fim	Teodoro da Baraúnas		Rede Globo
1982	Sétimo Sentido	Elísio Mendes		Rede Globo
1983	Caso Verdade	José Vilela (Padre José)	Episode: "A Padroeira"	Rede Globo
1983	Champagne	Gastão Félix Cintra		Rede Globo
1983	Caso Especial	Raul	Episode: "O Reencontro"	Rede Globo
1984	Padre Cícero	Carlos Bezerril (Major Bezerril)		Rede Globo
1985	Grande Sertão: Veredas	Solano Candelário (Sô Candelário)		Rede Globo
1986	Selva de Pedra	Sebastião Vilhena (Sessé)		Rede Globo
1988	Bebê a Bordo	Tarcísio Medeiros Rocha (Tico)		Rede Globo
1988	Chapadão do Bugre	Américo Brandão (Coronel Americão Brandão)		Rede Bandeirantes
1988	Vale Tudo	Salvador Accioli	Episode: "16 de maio"	Rede Globo
1989	Tieta	José Esteves (Zé Esteves)		Rede Globo
1989–90	Um Novo Tempo	Himself		Rede Globo
1990	Delegacia de Mulheres	Jerônimo	Episode: "Nossa Senhora dos Oprimidos"	Rede Globo
1990	Riacho Doce	Fabiano de Assis Motta		Rede Globo
1991	Caso Especial	Mayor João Cunha	Episode: "Os Homens Querem Paz"	Rede Globo
1991	Felicidade	João Pereira Alves (João do Piano)		Rede Globo
1991	Os Trapalhões	Coronel	Episode: "O Duelo"	Rede Globo
1993	Mulheres de Areia	Floriano Araújo		Rede Globo
1994	Memorial de Maria Moura	João Rufino (João Rufo)		Rede Globo
1994	Terça Nobre	Inocêncio	Episode: "O Compadre de Ogum"	Rede Globo
1995	Irmãos Coragem	Zacarias Araújo Menezes (Beato Zacarias)		Rede Globo
1995	História de Amor	Urbano Paiva		Rede Globo
1996	Anjo de Mim	Rutílio Freitas Bastos		Rede Globo
1997	Caça Talentos	Karnak	Episode: "Especial de Férias"	Rede Globo
1997	Por Amor	Priest at Marcelo and Maria Eduarda's wedding		Rede Globo
1998	Corpo Dourado	Sérvulo de Oliveira Brandão		Rede Globo
1999	Chiquinha Gonzaga	Cônego Trindade		Rede Globo
1999	Andando nas Nuvens	Hélio Arantes		Rede Globo
2000	Megatom	Padre		Rede Globo
2000	Aquarela do Brasil	Belmiro Cunha dos Santos		Rede Globo
2001	Porto dos Milagres	Bispo Ferraz		Rede Globo
2001	O Clone	Abdul Rachid (Tio Abdul)		Rede Globo
2003	A Casa das Sete Mulheres	Uncle Antônio		Rede Globo
2004	Cabocla	Felício Pinto		Rede Globo
2007	Caminhos do Coração	Mauro Fontes		Rede Record

=== Cinema ===
Year	Title	Role
1959	Um Caso de Polícia	Godofredo
1962	Assassinato em Copacabana	Rafael
1962	The Fifth Power	Milton
1969	A Um Pulo da Morte	Mr. Vasas
1969	Os Raptores	Commissioner Frank Severo
1977	Morte e Vida Severina	Mestre Carpina
1982	Índia, a Filha do Sol	Inspector
1983	Inocência	Martinho Pereira

=== Theater ===
Yar	Play	Role	Author	Director	Theater	Ref.
1949	Nossa Cidade		Thornton Wilder	Ziembinski	Santa Isabel Theater, Recife, Pernambuco	
1949	Além do Horizonte		Eugene O'Neill	Ziembinski	Santa Isabel Theater, Recife, Pernambuco	
1949	Fim de Jornada		Robert Sheriff	Ziembinski	Dérbi Theater, Recife, Pernambuco	
1953	Está Lá Fora um Inspetor		J. B. Priestley	Valdemar de Oliveira	Santa Isabel Theater, Recife, Pernambuco	
1955	Vestido de Noiva		Nelson Rodrigues	Flaminio Bollini Cerri	Santa Isabel Theater, Recife, Pernambuco	
1956	Othello	Michael Cassio	William Shakespeare	Adolfo Celi	Dulcina Theater, Rio de Janeiro, Federal District	
1956	A Viúva Astuciosa	Don Álvaro de Castela	Carlo Goldoni	Adolfo Celi	Rio de Janeiro, Federal District	
1957	A Bela Madame Vargas		João do Rio	Armando Couto	Rio de Janeiro, Federal District	
1960	Não Consultes Médico		Machado de Assis	Armando Couto	Rio de Janeiro, Rio de Janeiro	
1961	Lisbela e o Prisioneiro		Osman Lins	Aloísio Magalhães	Mesbla Theater, Rio de Janeiro, Rio de Janeiro	
1962	O Pagador de Promessas		Dias Gomes	José Renato	Rio de Janeiro, Rio de Janeiro	
1962	Bonitinha, mas Ordinária		Nelson Rodrigues	Eros Martim Gonçalves	Maison de France Theater, Rio de Janeiro, Rio de Janeiro	
1968	Os Inconfidentes		Cecília Meireles	Flávio Rangel	Theatro Municipal, Rio de Janeiro, Rio de Janeiro	
1977	Os Emigrados		Sławomir Mrożek	Ipojuca Pontes	Ipojuca Pontes	
1981—1983	A Volta por Cima		Domingos de Oliveira, Lenita Plonczynski	Domingos de Oliveira	Maison de France Theater, Rio de Janeiro, Rio de Janeiro	
1986	Fedra	Theseus	Jean Racine	Augusto Boal	Opinião Theater, Rio de Janeiro, Rio de Janeiro	
1997	A Invasão		Dias Gomes	Sérgio Fonta	Rio de Janeiro, Rio de Janeiro	
2006	Leitor por Horas		José Sanchis Sinisterra	Christiane Jatahy	Sesc, São Paulo	

== Prizes ==
Year	Prize	Category	Work	Result	Ref.
1977	Molière Prize	Best Actor	Os Emigrados	Won	
1983	Festival de Brasília	Best Supporting Actor	Inocência	Won	
