= Renúncia (1982 TV series) =

Renúncia (Renounciation) was a Brazilian telenovela aired by Rede Bandeirantes from 30 August to 12 September 1982, at 8pm. replacing Ninho da Serpente and being replaced months later by Sabor de Mel. It was written and directed by Geraldo Vietri and adapted from a psychography from medium Chico Xavier. It became notorious for only airing twelve episodes over a two-week period.

== Plot ==
The story begins in Paris, in 1862, where Suzana (Geórgia Gomide) is promised to her cousin Cirilo Davenport (Fúlvio Stefanini) since childhood. Meanwhile, she falls in love with her childhood friend Antero de Oviedo Vilamil (Carlos Capeletti) and the young Madalena Vilamil (Berta Zemel). Despite the promise of a marriage between Antero and Madalena which came since both were children, the girl's parents; Dom Inácio and Dona Margarida concede her hand to Cirilo. Facing that, the cousins and formerly rejected promised couple Suzana and Antero unite against the couple.

As the first act of her vengeance, Suzana moves to Lisbon and stays at Samuel and Constância's home, parents of Cirilo who were facing financial difficulties. The Davenport faily's financial and political problems, adding up to the manipulation of their niece, force them to move to Brazil, taking Cirilo distancing from Madalena. She becomes pregnant and Cirilo asks his former friend and former promise of her wife Antero to take care of her in her absence.

Some time later, a cholera outbreak spreads in Paris, where Suzana fakes a death for Madalena in a letter to Cirilo. On the other hand, another lie is sent to Madalena in which his lover disappeared in a shipwreck and in this moment, Alcione is born, daughter of Cirilo and Madalena.

== Cast ==
- Fúlvio Stefanini as Cirilo Davenport
- Berta Zemel as Madalena Vilamil
- Geórgia Gomide as Suzana
- Elias Gleizer as Tio Jacques
- Laura Cardoso as Margarida
- Yara Lins as Constância
- Flamínio Fávero as Jorge
- Carlos Capeletti as Antero
- Acê Moreira as Pierre
- Amaury Alvarez as Homero
- Arthur Leivas as Guilherme Davenport
- Chico Martins as Samuel Davenport
- Cláudia Alencar as Alcione
- Geisa Gama as Selena
- Ileana Sasa as Dra. Glória
- Ricardo Blat as Tubarão
- Irineu Pinheiro as Emmanuel
- Ísis Koschdoski as Dorotéia
- José Lucas as Augusto
- Josmar Martins as Silveira
- Lúcia Mello as Amália Gomes
- Luiz Carlos de Moraes as Dom Diego
- Marcos Mello as Patrício
- Monalisa Lins as Cecília
- Noemi Gerbelli as Dolores
- Serafim Gonzalez as Frei Damiano
- Xandó Batista as Dom Inácio
- Zé Carlos de Andrade as João Medeiros
- Osmar Costa as Antônio

== Production and broadcast ==
Renúncia was in production since 1979 and was directed by Geraldo Vietri. It was based on the 1943 book of the same name by Chico Xavier, which was attributed to Emmanuel. The key difference between the original novel and the telenovela is the setting: originally, the 1943 book was set in Ireland in 1662, eyeing immigration to North America; however the TV version was set in southwestern Europe, with emphasis on Paris and Lisbon, eyeing immigration to Brazil. All scenes were recorded in São Paulo, where Rede Bandeirantes is headquartered, and Bandeirantes believed in the success of the telenovela, a costly production for the time.

During its two weeks and twelve episodes on air, the telenovela scored a low IBOPE and, given the situation, replaced it with the airtime for the candidates of the upcoming parliamentary election. Once the election campaign period ended, Band refused to bring it back on air. On 29 September, Jornal do Brasil referred that Band ended the series "without greater explanations and little help from spirits", while repeating acts of "madness that were previously thought to be from Guga de Oliveira or Walter Clark", and ending with "less audience than Educativa".

Despite being taken off the air after two weeks, it still appeared on JB's TV listings during the second half of September 1982.
