= Sabor de Mel =

- Genre: Romantic; Drama; Mystery
- Created by: Jorge Andrade
- Directed by: Roberto Talma
- Starring: Main cast: Sandra Bréa; Flávio Galvão; Raul Cortez; Gianfrancesco Guarnieri; Célia Helena; Mila Moreira; Françoise Forton; Eva Todor; Carmem Silva; Claudia Alencar; Júlia Lemmertz; Karin Rodrigues; Elias Gleizer; Mayara Magri; Carlo Briani; (See more)
- Opening theme: "Tantas Palavras", by Chico Buarque
- Composers: Dominguinhos; Chico Buarque
- Country of origin: Brazil
- Original language: Portuguese
- No. of episodes: 95

Production
- Production location: São Paulo
- Running time: 45 minutes
- Production company: Band

Original release
- Network: Band
- Release: 4 April – 22 July 1983

Sabor de Mel is a Brazilian telenovela created by Jorge Andrade, produced and broadcast by Band from April 4 and July 22, 1983, in 95 chapters. Written by Andrade, with collaboration from Jaime Camargo and Lafayette Galvão, under the direction of Roberto Talma.

It features Sandra Bréa, Flávio Galvão, Raul Cortez, Gianfrancesco Guarnieri, Célia Helena, Eva Todor, Mila Moreira and Françoise Forton in the main roles. It was Andrade's last telenovela before his death on March 14, 1984.

== Plot ==
Laura is a beautiful woman, refined, elegant, mysterious, and calculating. A widow and millionaire, she owns a metalworking company, inherited from her husband, who committed suicide five years earlier to avoid bankruptcy. Since becoming a widow, Laura hasn't fallen in love with anyone. She lives in a bubble, waiting for someone to rekindle her heart.

Alberto is the CEO of Laura's metalworking company. Having been in love with her for years, he becomes the soul of the company to get closer to her. However, he can't win her over, nor decipher some of her mysteries. Who is Laura really? Where is she going? Why does she hide certain facets of her life? Why, young and beautiful, does she reject all men?

Laura piques the curiosity of everyone around her by placing an ad in the newspaper offering 20 million to whoever could solve her riddle: "It didn't exist, but it imprisoned and tortured, poisoned and corrupted, tormented, leading to ignorance and fear. A torture from which man, fulfilling his destiny, freed himself and transcended. An evil dragon that today's youth have defeated with the sword of hope."

The ad sparks the interest of a group of people, from different walks of life and social classes, who begin to interact with Laura.

Like Albertina, a woman divorced from a Portuguese man who sees the money as a way to rescue her daughter, taken by her father; Pedro, a retired factory worker who fights against his family to solve the riddle and ends up falling in love with Laura; Marta, who dreams of traveling the world; and Sérgio, William, and Paulo, university students who want the money for postgraduate studies abroad.

== Production ==
=== Start of recording and casts ===
The production of the telenovela Sabor de Mel was officially announced in March 1983 by Band (formerly TV Bandeirantes), as part of the network's strategy to strengthen its presence in prime time. Initially conceived with the working title Sabor de Veneno, the plot was renamed Sabor de Mel and assigned to renowned playwright Jorge Andrade, with general direction and production by Roberto Talma.

The pre-production process was swift, and the first cast meeting took place on March 14, 1983, at the station's São Paulo offices. On the same date, the cast was officially introduced to the press. Filming began a few days later, on March 17, under Talma's direction, with the first scenes shot in the studio on Saturday, March 19. Actors Sandra Bréa (recently hired by Band), Raul Cortez, Roberto Orozco, and Ileana Kwasinski participated in the initial recordings. In less than a week, production was already moving along at a rapid pace.

The cast for Sabor de Mel was considered robust, featuring renowned names in Brazilian drama. Sandra Bréa was chosen to play the protagonist Laura, an enigmatic and determined businesswoman. To embody the character, the actress adopted a striking look, cutting her hair in a Cleopatra style and dyeing it black, demonstrating dedication to the character's aesthetic. Raul Cortez, recently hired by Band, played Alberto, the executive director of the metalworking company Laura presides over. Cortez even moved with his family to São Paulo to dedicate himself full-time to filming.

Other confirmed roles included Júlia Lemmertz, Zaira Bueno, and Eva Todor, who played Marta. Eva, in fact, accepted Talma's invitation without even reading the synopsis, trusting Jorge Andrade's script. Cláudia Alencar played Tereza and, at the time, was eagerly awaiting her simultaneous debut in both a soap opera and theater. The cast also included Célia Helena, Paulo Autran, Françoise Forton (returning to television), Elias Gleiser (dividing his time between theater and television as the character Pacheco), Gianfrancesco Guarnieri, and even fashion designer Clodovil Hernandes, who was also confirmed as a cast member.

=== Premiere ===
The premiere of the telenovela, which would fill the space left by the TV Globo soap opera, Sol de Verão (abruptly ended after the death of actor Jardel Filho), had its schedule adjusted. Initially scheduled to premiere on March 28, 1983, at 8 p.m., the premiere of Sabor de Mel was postponed by a week, with the new date confirmed for April 4. It aired at 7:50 p.m., after the telenovela Campeão, marking Band's return to the 8 p.m. time slot with an original production.

By launching Sabor de Mel during this period, Band sought to capitalize on a strategic window in the competition, as Globo was airing a rerun of O Casarão during the time slot, due to the early end of Sol de Verão. This move demonstrated Band's boldness in "going in headfirst" and competing in the prime time slot for Brazilian television drama.

=== End of filmings and Outcome ===
Despite a bold launch campaign and a promising start, with peak ratings of 18 points in IBOPE and around 4 million viewers, Sabor de Mel's success was fleeting. TV Globo reacted quickly to the competition, bringing forward the premiere of its 8pm soap opera, Louco Amor, which resulted in a sharp drop in Band's ratings. The soap's ratings plummeted to critical levels, and the crisis also worsened behind the scenes.

On June 5, 1983, a Jornal do Brasil article denounced the disrespectful way in which Band removed writer Jorge Andrade from the soap opera. Without prior notice, he only learned of the replacement when he arrived at the station to submit new episodes. Andrade was reportedly left waiting for four hours in an anteroom to receive an explanation from director Roberto Talma, behavior that sparked protests in the press, describing it as "dishonest" and "lacking the slightest dignity." On June 9 of the same year, Jorge Andrade confirmed his departure from the production. He revealed that the decision was motivated by the network's pressure to "popularize" the series in light of its low ratings. According to Andrade, Talma suggested the need to "Mexicanize the telenovela." The writer refused, stating, "This is my level of writing, and I won't lower it." Talma reportedly responded, "Nor do we want you to lower your level." The last chapter with text by Andrade was number 54, shown on June 6, 1983. From then on, Lafayette Galvão assumed the authorship of the soap opera.

Even with the change of writer and plot changes, the situation was not reversed. On July 10, 1983, due to low ratings, Band decided that Sabor de Mel, originally planned to have approximately 120 episodes, would be shortened. The final episodes were filmed that same week. On July 17, it was announced that Sabor de Mel would be reduced by approximately 100 episodes, ending early at the end of the month. The telenovela's departure was a sad end, following the departure of its original writer and with a modified plot—in Talma's words, "Mexicanized" – it failed to win back the audience. During its four months on the air, the ratings remained between 0.7 and 6.0 points, a performance considered a major failure. The final episode aired on July 30 of the same year, totaling 95 episodes, and was replaced by a rerun of the first season of Os Imigrantes, starting on August 1 of the same year.

== Cast ==
Actor/Actress	Character
Sandra Bréa	Laura Lorek
Flávio Galvão	Guilherme Pereira
Raul Cortez	Dr. Alberto Brandão
Gianfrancesco Guarnieri	Pedro Pereira
Célia Helena	Isolina Pereira
Mila Moreira	Luba Assunção
Françoise Forton	Rebeca Brandão
Eva Todor	Marta Medeiros
Carmen Silva	Jojô Medeiros
Claudia Alencar	Tereza Medeiros
Júlia Lemmertz	Beatriz Ribeiro
Karin Rodrigues	Albertina Ribeiro
Elias Gleizer	Pacheco
Mayara Magri	Terezinha Pereira
Carlo Briani	Sérgio
Giuseppe Oristanio	Paulo
Taumaturgo Ferreira	William
Cristina Prochaska	Ângela Medeiros
Zaira Bueno	Flávia Medeiros
Maria Helena Imbassahy	Valquiria Guerra
Luiz Serra	Humberto Guerra
Ileana Kwasinski	Fedora
Roberto Orozco	Oliveira
Ivan Lima	Afonso
Sônia Samaia	Sônia
Neide Giacon	Irene
Kiko Guerra	Devair

=== Special appearances ===
Actor/Actress	Character
Odilon Wagner	Samuel Lorek
Clodovil Hernandes	Himself

== Broadcast ==
The telenovela premiered on April 4, 1983, after a one-year hiatus without an eight o'clock soap opera following the sudden removal of Renúncia from the network's schedule. In its first episodes, it demonstrated very favorable ratings for Bandeirantes, reaching 18 points compared to Jornal Nacional and the compact rerun of O Casarão on TV Globo.

The telenovela was rerun between July 17 and October 31, 1989, at 4:30 PM, with 77 episodes, replacing Cavalo Amarelo and being replaced by the series Casa de Irene.

== Soundtrack ==
Sabor de Mel (Trilha Sonora Original Nacional)

Soundtrack album by Various artists
- Released: May 1983
- Genres: MPB; romantic; samba; soul; pop; forró; folk
- Length: 46:25
- Language: Portuguese
- Labels: Ariola; Disco Ban
- Director: Mazzola (artistic director)
- Producer: Elvio Bombardi

Sabor de Mel (Trilha Sonora Original Nacional) is the soundtrack of the Brazilian telenovela of the same name shown by Band, released in May 1983 by the record label Ariola, under the Disco Ban label (the phonographic label belonging to the broadcaster itself) on LP and cassette, with artistic direction by Mazzola and musical production by Elvio Bombardi, containing songs performed by MPB artists, with Chico Buarque, João Bosco, Milton Nascimento, Elba Ramalho, Alceu Valença, Geraldo Azevedo, Kleiton & Kledir, Gal Costa, Ney Matogrosso, Marina Lima, Tadeu Mathias and MPB4, which played during the scenes of the soap opera and evoke themes of mystery and intrigue, identity, belonging and duality, complexity and delicacy of relationships, freedom and aspiration, intense, instinctive passion, melancholy, hope, dilemmas and uncertainties in love, rebirth and overcoming of pain, intensity and sacrifice of love, expression and emotional autonomy, and the conclusion and renewal of the plot.

Track listing

Side A
No.	Title	Writer(s)	Artist(s)	Length
1.	"Tantas Palavras" (Opening theme)	Dominguinhos; Chico Buarque	Chico Buarque	5:21
2.	"Nação"	João Bosco; Aldir Blanc; Paulo Emílio	João Bosco	4:34
3.	"Teia de Renda"	Túlio Mourão; Milton Nascimento	Milton Nascimento	2:40
4.	"Sete Cantigas Para Voar"	Vital Farias	Elba Ramalho	3:07
5.	"Como Dois Animais"	Alceu Valença	Alceu Valença	4:04
6.	"Rasgo de Lua" (Pedro's theme)	Geraldo Amaral; Geraldo Azevedo; Carlos Fernando	Geraldo Azevedo	3:11

Side B
No.	Title	Writer(s)	Artist(s)	Length
7.	"Nem Pensar"	Kleiton & Kledir	Kleiton & Kledir	3:55
8.	"Luz do Sol" (Laura's theme)	Caetano Veloso	Gal Costa	4:05
9.	"Tanto Amar"	Chico Buarque	Ney Matogrosso	3:34
10.	"Emoção" (Tereza's theme)	Roberto Carlos; Erasmo Carlos	Marina	4:08
11.	"Branco de Alma Negra"	Marcos Rocha	Tadeu Mathias	2:35
12.	"Viração"	Kledir Ramil; Fogaça	MPB4	4:28
