= Monique Alves Frankenhuis =

Brazilian actress

- Born: Monique Alves Frankenhuis; August 7, 1962; Rio de Janeiro, Rio de Janeiro, Brazil
- Died: August 29, 1994 (aged 32)
- Occupation: Actress

Monique Alves Frankenhuis (August 7, 1962 – August 29, 1994 in Rio de Janeiro), best known as Monique Alves, was a Brazilian actress, daughter of Jean Pierre Frankenhuis and Alcina Maria Fernandes Alves. She died in 1994 due to complications from leukemia. She was married to director Dennis Carvalho (TV Globo), with whom she had a daughter, Tainah, now mother of Nina and Lara.

== Filmography ==
=== Film ===
Year	Title	Role	Director
1990	Meu Bem, Meu Mal	Luciana	
1989	Pacto de Sangue		
1986	Rock Mania	Renata	
1984	A Máfia no Brasil – Minissérie		
1984	Partido Alto		
1984	Amenic – Entre o Discurso e a Prática		
1983	Pão Pão, Beijo Beijo	Maria Helena	
1982	Sétimo Sentido	Rosinha	
1982	Aventuras de um Paraíba		
