= Tieta (TV series) =

Brazilian soap opera

- Genre: soap opera
- Based on: Tieta by Jorge Amado
- Written by: Aguinaldo Silva; Ana Maria Moretzsohn; Ricardo Linhares
- Directed by: Paulo Ubiratan
- Starring: Betty Faria; Sebastião Vasconcelos
- Theme music composer: Paulo Debétio; Boni
- Opening theme: "Tieta" performed by Luiz Caldas
- Ending theme: "Tieta" performed by Luiz Caldas
- Composers: Paulo Debétio; Boni
- Country of origin: Brazil
- Original language: Portuguese
- No. of episodes: 197

Production
- Executive producer: Mariano Gatti
- Production locations: Mangue Seco; São Paulo
- Cinematography: Antonio Acevedo
- Editors: Alberto Gouvêa; César Chaves
- Camera setup: Multi-camera
- Running time: 60 minutes

Original release
- Network: Rede Globo
- Release: 14 August 1989 – 31 March 1990

Tieta is a 1989 Brazilian telenovela, produced and broadcast by Rede Globo. It originally aired between 14 August 1989, and 30 March 1990, spanning 196 episodes. It was TV Globo's 41st primetime telenovela, preceded by O Salvador da Pátria and followed by Rainha da Sucata.

It was based on Brazilian writer Jorge Amado's 1977 novel of the same name, and was written by Aguinaldo Silva, Ricardo Linhares and Ana Maria Moretzsohn. It was directed by Reynaldo Boury, Ricardo Waddington and Luiz Fernando Carvalho, under general direction by Paulo Ubiratan.

In June 2012 it was released on DVD by Globo Marcas.

== Production ==
Helena Gastal and Lessa de Lacerda designed over one thousand costumes for the novel. Iris Gomes da Costa researched expressions cited in the work of Jorge Amado, and colloquial terms of the region, so that the characters spoke with the accent and used the vocabulary of northeastern Brazil.

The fictional city of Santana do Agreste, which according to the storyline is supposed to be an hour by bus from Esplanada in the state of Bahia, was composed of 46 buildings, 2 churches, 8 streets, 2 squares, an abandoned circus and 15 ruins. Everything was built in an area of 10,000m², in Guaratiba, a West Zone neighborhood in the city of Rio de Janeiro, Brazil. The street floors were a reproduction of those made in fiberglass by local artisans in Laranjeiras, a town in the state of Sergipe. Production artists Cristina Médicis, Marta Kubitschek and Andréa Penafiel took local objects and saints statues from Sergipe to Rio de Janeiro, in order to compose the scenography.

== Cast ==
- Betty Faria - Antonieta (Tieta) Esteves
- Joana Fomm - Perpétua Esteves Batista
- Cássio Gabus Mendes - Ricardo Batista
- José Mayer - Osnar
- Lídia Brondi - Leonora
- Reginaldo Faria - Ascanio Trindade
- Arlete Salles - Carmosina
- Yoná Magalhães - Tonha
- Sebastião Vasconcelos - José (Zé) Esteves
- Tássia Camargo - Elisa Esteves D'Alembert
- Paulo Betti - Timóteo D'Alembert
- Françoise Forton - Helena
- Ary Fontoura - Coronel Artur da Tapitanga
- Marcos Paulo - Arturzinho da Tapitanga / Mirko Stéphano
- Luciana Braga - Maria Imaculada
- Armando Bógus - Modesto Pires
- Bete Mendes - Aída Pires
- Luíza Tomé - Carol
- Roberto Bonfim - Amintas
- Cláudio Corrêa e Castro - Padre Mariano
- Lília Cabral - Amorzinho
- Rosane Gofman - Cinira
- Miriam Pires - Dona Milu
- Rogéria - Ninete / Valdemar
- Paulo José - Gladstone
- Cláudia Ohana - Young Tieta
- José de Abreu - Mascate
- José Lewgoy - Leovegildo
- Herson Capri - Lucas
- Danton Mello - Cupertino (Peto) Batista
- Flávio Galvão - Comandante Dário
- Ana Lúcia Torre - Juraci Pitombo
- Elias Gleizer - Jairo
- Ingra Lyberato - Young Tonha
- Jorge Dória - Padre Hilário
- Otávio Augusto - Marcolino Pitombo
- Marcos Winter - Young Osnar
- Cláudia Magno - Silvana
- Bemvindo Sequeira - Bafo de Bode
- Thaís de Campos - Young Carmosina

== Soundtrack ==
Tieta spanned two soundtrack albums, Tieta and Tieta 2, both released in 1989. During its reprise, in 1994, Som Livre released an album entitled Tieta Especial, compiling the hit songs of the two original albums. Its cover was similar to that of Tieta 2, with a photo of Betty Faria as Tieta.

Tieta
No.	Title	Writer(s)	Performer(s)	Length
1.	"Meia-Lua Inteira"	Carlinhos Brown	Caetano Veloso	3:36
2.	"Tudo que se Quer" (All I Ask of You)	Andrew Lloyd Webber, C. Hart, R. Stilgoe / Nelson Motta (version)	Emílio Santiago and Verônica Sabino	3:57
3.	"No Rancho Fundo"	Ary Barroso, Lamartine Babo	Chitãozinho & Xororó	4:12
4.	"Paixão Antiga"	Marcos Valle, Paulo Sérgio Valle	Tim Maia	4:09
5.	"Paixão de Beata (Neném Mulher)"	Pinto do Acordeon	Pinto do Acordeon	3:23
6.	"Tieta"	Paulo Debétio, Boni	Luiz Caldas	2:56
7.	"Segredos da Noite" (Instrumental)	Paulo Debétio, Julinho Teixeira	-	3:46
8.	"Coração do Agreste"	Moacir Luz, Aldir Blanc	Fafá de Belém	4:12
9.	"Eu e Você"	Renato Barros, Vadinho	José Augusto	4:03
10.	"Cadê o Meu Amor?"	Toinho Alves, Marcelo Melo	Quinteto Violado	2:10
11.	"Amor Escondido"	Fagner, Abel Silva	Fagner	4:38
12.	"Por Você Com Você"	Guilherme Arantes	Guilherme Arantes	3:57
13.	"Tenha Calma"	Djavan	Maria Bethânia	4:04
14.	"Imaculada" (Instrumental)	Ary Sperling	-	3:18
Total length:				51:37

Tieta 2
No.	Title	Writer(s)	Performer(s)	Length
1.	"Imaculada"	Ary Sperling, Aldir Blanc	Elba Ramalho	4:04
2.	"Uma Nova Mulher"	Paulo Debétio, Paulinho Resende	Simone	4:33
3.	"Dancei"	Argemiro	Martinho da Vila	2:33
4.	"Alguém Me Disse"	Evaldo Gouveia, Jair Amorim	Gal Costa	3:40
5.	"A Lua e o Mar"	Moraes Moreira, Pepeu Gomes, Fausto Nilo	Moraes Moreira e Pepeu Gomes	4:04
6.	"Água na Boca"	Marcos Wagner	3 do Nordeste	2:48
7.	"Urbana"	Ary Sperling	Ary Sperling	4:13
8.	"Luar do Sertão"	Catulo da Paixão Cearense, João Pernambuco	Roberta Miranda	4:35
9.	"Indo e Vindo" (One For The Road)	Bob Dylan, Paulo Ricardo (version)	Paulo Ricardo	4:06
10.	"Vem Morena"	Danilo Caymmi, Paulo César Pinheiro	Nana Caymmi	2:30
11.	"Doida pra te Amar"	Nando Cordel	Nando Cordel featuring Amelinha	3:43
12.	"Sinceridade" (Sinceridad)	Rafael Gaston Perez, João Bosco (version)	João Bosco	4:06
13.	"Toucan's Dance"	Dori Caymmi	Sérgio Mendes	3:42
14.	"O Comandante (Star Splangled Banner) / O Bêbado"	John Philip Sousa, J. Catarina (arrange and adaptation) / J. Catarina	Banda de Santana do Agreste	1:57
Total length:				54:42
