= O Rapto do Garoto de Ouro =

1982 novel by Marcos Rey

- Original 1982 cover
- Author: Marcos Rey
- Language: Portuguese
- Genre: Mystery, adventure
- Publisher: Ática
- Publication date: 1982
- Publication place: Brazil
- Pages: 123
- Preceded by: O Mistério do Cinco Estrelas (1981)
- Followed by: Um Cadáver Ouve Rádio (1983)

O Rapto do Garoto de Ouro (The Golden Boy's Abduction) is a novel written by Brazilian writer Marcos Rey, originally released in 1982. The story takes place in the neighborhood of Bexiga (São Paulo) and chronicles the adventures of a trio consisting of Leo, Gino and Angela, who come to investigate the abduction of their friend Alfredo (the Golden Boy) who had recently become famous thanks to a reality show. With the help of Jaime (another friend of Alfredo) and a green diary, they go to question on their own a few people who may be responsible for the Golden Boy's abduction.

The book is part of a four-book mystery series featuring the amateur detective trio Léo, Ângela, and Gino—which also includes O Mistério do 5 Estrelas (1981), Um Cadáver Ouve Rádio (1983_ and Um Rosto no Computador (1992)—published in the Vaga-Lume Collection.

Reprint cover.

== Plot ==
On a Friday night, rockstar Alfredo, is home alone preparing to perform at this birthday party in a canteen in the neighborhood of Bexiga, São Paulo. His family and friends wait in the canteen until they notice the boy's delay. Leo and Angela, Alfredo's friends, go to his house by request of Alfredo's father and notice he's missing. Leo finds a button from Alfredo's clothes, a smashed guitar and a green diary, which lists various names from neighbors known to them.

On Saturday, police investigate the Carlucci's house for evidence, but the deductions prove inconclusive. Later that morning, Leo shows the green diary to his paraplegic cousin Gino, and invites him to investigate Alfredo's disappearance on their own. Gino warns him that he will be participating in a chess championship in the next few days and won't be able to accompany Leo, but advises him to call Angela, a friend of theirs for a while now. Leo readily accepts, but with the possibility that Angela won't want or won't be able to join, Gino decides to call Jaime, the man who brought Alfredo to fame.

Alfredo finally wakes up in his prison, but to his nervousness, the place has no electric lighting or clean water. Using the little light that enters through a tiny window, he sees that someone left food and drink to avoid contact, as well as notes warning him to be quiet or else he's going to be bound and gagged. Alfredo thinks to himself that he should not be far from home.

Leo, Angela, Jaime and Gino form a commission to investigate the abduction. The commander is Gino, who's unable to keep up with the group. Initially, they investigate each name that is in the green diary. However, the friends can't reach a conclusion since the majority of the interviewed people had attitudes or motives to be considered guilty. Meanwhile, Alfredo is still locked up, and on Sunday, the kidnapper contacts Alfredo's family through phone calls and letters requesting much money and other requirements. The next morning Gino decides to give the diary to the police and tells them everything they had done so far. Not helping much, Sr. Domingos, Alfredo's father, decides to keep the police away and pay the kidnapper. In the meantime, Alfredo manages to escape from his prison and runs home, where he reunites with his family as the news of his return spread rapidly throughout the city.

On Tuesday, Alfredo gives his testimony to the police station, but they still don't have any conclusions. Everyone's frustrated, but Gino safely says that the kidnapper is Jaime. They are all surprised and Sr. Domingos cannot believe it. When they open the trunk of Jaime's car, they see the bag of money Sr. Domingos had given to the kidnapper. Jaime confesses his wrongdoings and reveals that he wanted the money to run away with his old love Laura Ferrucci, as his business was failing. Jaime is arrested and Alfredo finally does his show in the canteen.

== Main characters ==
- Alfredo: The main character of the story, was a normal teenager but became a star of the national music. He is a very joyful, proud, friendly and elegant boy. He got kidnapped and the story revolves around this fact. He had a poor and humble childhood and loves singing from an early age. The nickname "Golden Boy" is due to his blond and rebellious hair. He's also remarkable because of freckles on his face.
- Leo: Great friend of Alfredo, was the first to engage in the search for him. He's also in love with Angela. He's very brave and his wit was essential to the outcome of the case. He works at the Emperor Park Hotel from Monday to Friday and studies at night. Sometimes Leo is imperative, leaving his emotions to speak for him.
- Angela: The only woman in the group, she's fearless and smart. Coming from a family of upper middle class, she impresses with her beauty. Leo has a crush on her, but there's nothing official.
- Gino: Paraplegic, he's the brain and the leader of the group, always giving the directions of research to Leo and Angela. He was not present during the interviews with the suspects, because he was participating in a chess championship, being a genius in this sport.
- Jaime: Also called "Jaimão" (Big Jaime), was the manager of Alfredo and when he disappears, Jaime is one of the first to volunteer to help solve the case. He worked as a realtor and has experience in radio, he can mimic many voices, both male and female.

== Suspects ==
Madame Santa: old seamstress in the neighborhood. She had a successful atelier where she made dresses for brides. She hates Alfredo's mother, because she has opted not to make her wedding dress in Santa's studio.

Enrico: the sausage maker. He was hit in the head with a heavy object and was hospitalized. He knew details of the kidnapping, but the kidnapper had to silence him to avoid problems.

Heitor Salvattore: known as the "Iron Arm" of the neighborhood, he's always seen in bars making bets with other men. He has incredible strength, and always do favors for neighbors. Angela noticed a bruise on his forehead, caused by hot water thrown on him by a maid, whom he wanted to kiss.

Marino Battaglia: owner of a kennel, was accused of falsifying pedigrees and sell other people's dogs. He fears that the golden boy's abduction will let him in trouble, because he's had previous problems with the police.

Rizardo Tozzi: a fat, friendly man. He earned a reputation by participating in cooking competitions and he's able to eat an entire feast. Closed agreements at the local pizzeria. Because of this, he became ill and wouldn't attend the place. The doctor told him to stay home and lose weight. He is taken care by his mother.

Laura Ferruci: former Miss Bela Vista. She was incredibly beautiful, but over time her popularity was falling. Jaime had a romantic interest in her, hence the fact of having kidnapped Alfredo. Jaime wanted to get away with her, so he needed money. Laura knew about the abduction, so she attempted suicide to avoid arrest.

Silvio Poiares: a dentist, he was quickly eliminated from the list of suspects because he had traveled times before the abduction.

Zorba: a former Greek sailor, was confronted by Leo and Angela. Angry, he chased them through the tenement yard he lives in. Leo and Angela managed to escape. Anyway, Zorba was not guilty because on the day of the kidnapping, was playing cards on a ship.

João Cabeçada: a former outlaw who is now at the local church. The kidnapper used his machine to send letters to Alfredo's family.

Oscar: a nice and happy guy. He is blind, and in the night of the abduction, he was at home reading a book when he heard the kidnapper's car arrive at Alfredo's house. Also, someone came along the street and shouted to the kidnapper, implying that he was well dressed. Oscar's participation was crucial in the investigation since he gave important and extremely accurate details of the events.

== Other Media ==
In 2012, a film adaptation of the novel was announced by the production company RT Features.
