= José Bonifácio de Oliveira Sobrinho =

Brazilian television executive

Boni
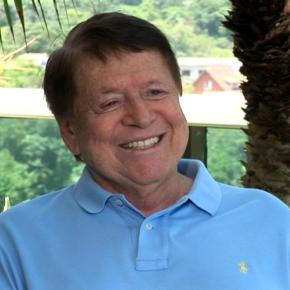
- Boni in 2012
- Born: José Bonifácio de Oliveira Sobrinho; November 30, 1935 (age 90); Osasco, São Paulo, Brazil
- Citizenship: Brazilian
- Occupations: Advertising executive Businessman; Television director
- Employer: TV Globo
- Organization: Rede Vanguarda
- Known for: General director of TV Globo

José Bonifácio de Oliveira Sobrinho, or simply Boni (November 30, 1935), is a Brazilian advertising executive, businessman, and television director. He is considered one of the key figures behind the launch and expansion of TV Gobo.

== Biography ==
=== First years ===
José Bonifácio de Oliveira Sobrinho, known as Boni, was born in the city of Osasco, in São Paulo, on 30 November 1935. He is the son of Orlando de Oliveira, a dentist who played the guitar and cavaquinho in Armandinho's regional ensemble on Rádio Cultura in São Paulo. He is the nephew of Hermínio, a member of the ensemble Quatro Ases e um Curinga. He has been visiting radio studios since he was a boy.

At the age of fifteen, he moved to Rio de Janeiro to start a career in radio. On the recommendation of an uncle, he secured an internship as an assistant to the playwright Dias Gomes, then director of Rádio Clube do Brasil. Some time later, Dias Gomes referred him to a radio course organised by the city council at Rádio Roquette Pinto, where he gained his first insights into broadcasting and writing.

In 1950, he was hired as a scriptwriter for the programme Clube Juvenil Toddy on Rádio Nacional. There, he met the radio presenter and comedian Manuel de Nóbrega, who was looking for scriptwriters to work at the station's São Paulo branch, which was then in the process of being set up. In 1951, he returned to São Paulo to work as Manuel de Nóbrega's personal secretary and to join the team of scriptwriters at Rádio Nacional, which had recently been established in São Paulo.

=== Television and advertising agencies ===
In 1953, at the age of 17, he accepted an invitation to work at Assis Chateaubriand’s Rádio Tupi, based in São Paulo. Also owned by Chateaubriand, he took up his first job at TV Tupi, which was run by Dermeval Costalina and Cassiano Gabus Mendes, to whom Boni reported and for whom he performed various roles, including those of producer, director and scriptwriter for the programme ‘Grêmio Juvenil Tupi’. The following year, he joined TV Paulista, the precursor to TV Globo in the state of São Paulo, to work as assistant to the station's artistic director, Roberto Corte Real. The station's financial situation, however, was dire, and so, that same year, he went to work as a copywriter at Rádio Bandeirantes.

In 1955, he became head of the Radio and Television Department at the São Paulo-based advertising agency Lintas Propaganda, where he worked alongside Rodolfo Lima Martensen, José Scatena and Maria Augusta Barbosa de Mattos, known as Guta, who would later go on to coordinate the cast at TV Globo in Rio de Janeiro. At the same time, he was the head of publicity at the record label RGE Discos, releasing albums by artists such as Maysa Matarazzo and Chico Buarque, amongst others. In 1957, after completing a training programme at the advertising agency J. W. Thompson in the UK and at NBC in New York City, he took over as creative director at Linx Filmes, the first company specialising in television commercials. He held this position until 1959.

In 1960, he became head of the Radio and Television Creative Department at the Multi Propaganda agency in São Paulo, where he worked with Jorge Adib. He was also head of the Radio and Television Department at the Alcântara Machado agency in São Paulo. In 1962, he took over as artistic director at Rádio Bandeirantes and, in 1963, he set up, and later sold, his own agency, Proeme Publicidade e Mercadologia. Also that year, he worked at TV Rio, at the invitation of Walter Clark, with whom he had been friends since his days at Lintas.

Following a brief stint at TV Excelsior in 1964, he returned to TV Tupi to set up the Telecentro das Emissoras Associadas, which would have made it possible to create a national television network operating with a single schedule; however, the project did not come to fruition.

=== TV Globo ===
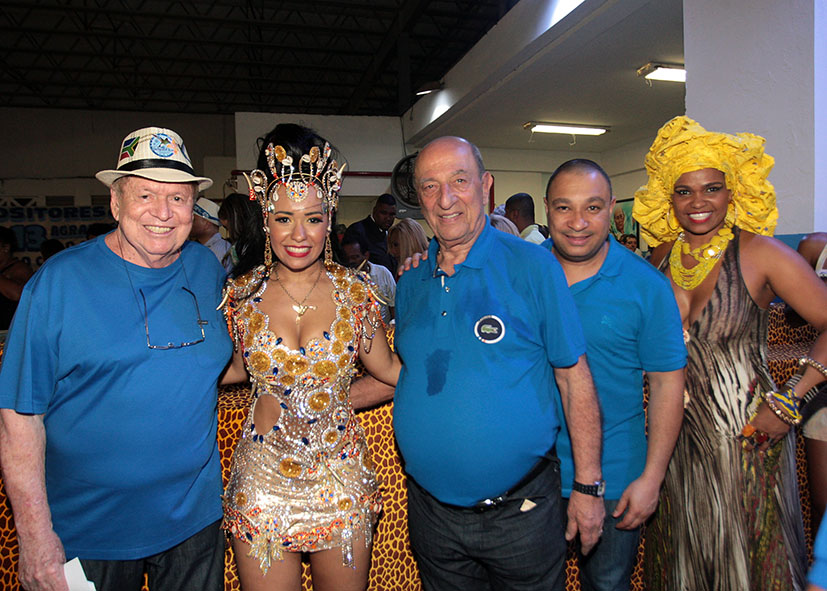
Boni, on the left, at the 2014 Beija-Flor Samba School

Walter Clark, then an executive at TV Globo, extended a new invitation to Boni in 1967, this time asking him to take charge of TV Globo's programming and production department. It was an opportunity to try once again to establish a national television network. The idea of the network would become a reality in 1969, when Embratel launched a more modern transmission system. The real milestone marking the network's launch was the debut, in September of that year, of Jornal Nacional, the first regular programme broadcast live across the country. In 1970, Boni became TV Globo's Head of Production and Programming.

Together with Walter Clark, Boni devised the basic format of TV Globo's programming that remains in place today, with the prime time schedule consisting of three soap operas, Jornal Nacional between the second and third, and a special programme to follow. Between 1969 and 1971, he was also a member of the International Convention of the National Association of Broadcasters (NAB) in the United States and the European Broadcasting Union (EBU). He was responsible for all areas of the broadcaster's programming, including news, which remained under his supervision until Evandro Carlos de Andrade took over as director of the Globo Journalism Center (CGJ) in 1995.

He brought about significant changes in TV Globo's artistic department. It was he who concluded that it was essential to change the direction of the broadcaster's television drama, which was still stuck in the swashbuckling genre, upon realising the new avenue that had been opened up by the success of the soap opera Beto Rockfeller, broadcast in 1968 on TV Tupi and directed by Walter Avancini and Lima Duarte. With Walter Clark's backing, he opted for a more realistic style of drama that portrayed contemporary Brazilian daily life, and was responsible for bringing Daniel Filho, Dias Gomes and Janete Clair to TV Globo.

He was involved in the creation of several programmes, such as Fantástico (1973), Roberto Carlos Especial (1974), the comedy series Superbronco (1979), starring the comedian Ronald Golias, Você Decide (1992) and the series Mulher (1998). He even wrote the lyrics for the opening themes of various programmes, such as Fantástico (1973) and the soap operas Que Rei Sou Eu? (1989) and Tieta (1989). By 1980, Roberto Irineu Marinho had already become vice-president of TV Globo, and Boni took over as vice-president of operations at the Rio de Janeiro-based broadcaster, a role he held until the end of 1997. He then remained as a consultant to the broadcaster until 2001. In an interview with the Flow Podcast, Boni stated that he was fired by the Marinho family and said it was a “kick in the butt,” adding that “I could have helped rebuild the company in a different way; I could have been more useful to Globo than I was.” “I left Roberto Irineu’s office—he’s my friend and I like him a lot—he wasn’t wrong; he wanted to keep the toy for himself; he’s the owner.”

In the context of the 1989 presidential election, the first direct presidential election following the military dictatorship, the iconic debate between Fernando Collor de Mello (PRN) and Luiz Inácio Lula da Silva (PT), produced by Globo, took place. The debate was a decisive moment in the campaign. Boni favored the editing of Fernando Collor's performance, as he was Roberto Marinho’s candidate in the runoff. Boni carried folders containing alleged accusations that Collor had against Lula, which were empty, and ruffled Collor's hair and messed up his tie to generate more empathy between Collor and the public. The incident is considered decisive for the 1989 election and is widely discussed in journalism schools regarding ethics.

== Personal life ==
He was married to Regina Brasil, with whom he had his first son, the television producer Boninho. Since 1984, he has been married to Lou de Oliveira, with whom he has two sons and a daughter. He is the father-in-law of actress Ana Furtado. A SC Corinthians Paulista fan, he even became an advisory member of the club at the invitation of advertising executive Washington Olivetto.

== Other activies ==
Since 2003, he has been a partner, alongside his four children, in Rede Vanguarda, a TV Globo affiliate in the Paraíba Valley in São Paulo. He has become quite active on social media, especially on Instagram, sharing restaurant and wine recommendations from a wide variety of countries.

He was invited by the then mayor of São Paulo, João Doria (PSDB), in 2016 to take over as head of the São Paulo Municipal Department of Culture, but he did not accept the position.

=== Books ===
In 2011, he released his first memoir, O Livro do Boni, published by Casa da Palavra. In 2015, he published his first work of fiction, Unidos do Outro Mundo: Dialogando com os mortos, through the publisher Estação Brasil. In 2024, he released a new memoir, O lado B de Boni, published by Best-Seller.

== Tributes ==
On 25 October 2010, he was awarded the Order of Ipiranga, in the rank of Grand Officer, by the Government of the State of São Paulo, Alberto Goldman (PSDB). He was honoured by his favourite samba school, Beija-Flor, during the 2014 carnival with the theme ‘The Shining Star of Brazilian Communication’.

In 2017, he was awarded the Order of Cultural Merit (OMC) by then-President Michel Temer (MDB) for his work in television.
