= Jacqueline Laurence =

Brazilian actress (1932–2024)

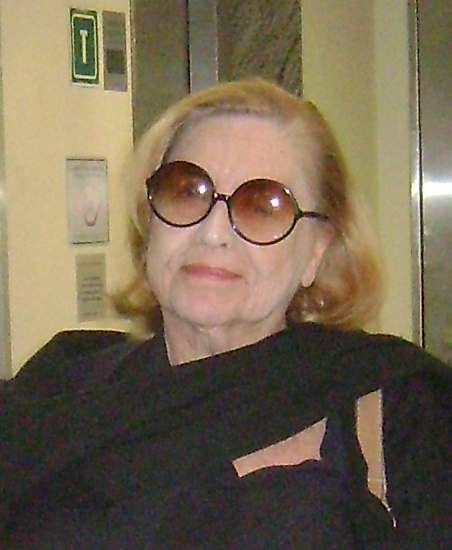
- Born: Jacqueline Juliette Laurence; 10 October 1932; Marseille, France
- Died: 17 June 2024 (aged 91); Rio de Janeiro, Brazil
- Occupation: Actress

Jacqueline Juliette Laurence (10 October 1932 – 17 June 2024) was a Brazilian actress and theatre director. She was born in France and came to Brazil as a teenager, following her father, who was a journalist.

Laurence died from a cardiac arrest at Hospital Municipal Miguel Couto, in Rio de Janeiro, on 17 June 2024. She was 91.

== Filmography ==
=== Television ===
Year	Series	Role	Notes
1972	Uma Rosa com Amor	Alzira	
1978	Dancin' Days	Solange	
1980	Água Viva	Clarice	
1980	As Três Marias	Alzira	
1982	Sétimo Sentido	Célia	
1983	Guerra dos Sexos	Mireille	
1984	Marquesa de Santos	Baronesa de Goytacazes	
1985	Antônio Maria	Catarina	
1985	Tudo em Cima	Roberta Landi	
1986	Cambalacho	Dominique	
1986	Dona Beija	Madame Constance	(episodes: 10–13 of April)
1987	Bambolê	Charlotte de Pomp	
1988	Grupo Escolacho	Various characters	
1989	Top Model	Simone Bourier	
1990	Brasileiras e Brasileiros	Antoniette	
1990	Delegacia de Mulheres	Marie	(episode: Em Defesa da Honra)
1991	O Dono do Mundo	Zoraide	
1992	Você Decide	Rosana	(episode: Prova Final)
1994	Confissões de Adolescente	Madame Renée	(episodes: Liberdade Tem Limite–Despertar da Primavera)
1994	Incidente em Antares	Solange	
1994	Você Decide	Rosana	
1996	Salsa e Merengue	Eglantine	
1997	Sai de Baixo	Adelaide	(episode: Os Ricos Também Roubam)
1999	Você Decide	Rosana	(episode: Dublê de Socialite)
1999	Mulher	Josefine Marques	(episode: Lugar ao Sol)
2001	As Filhas da Mãe	Margot de Montparnasse	
2004	Da Cor do Pecado	Viúva de Almeidinha	
2005	Senhora do Destino	Evangelina	(episodes: 3–4 of January)
2005	A Lua Me Disse	Emelyne Junot (Memé)	
2006	Cobras & Lagartos	Tidinha	
2007	Desejo Proibido	Romilda	
2007	Malhação	Maria Pia	
2007	Toma Lá, Dá Cá	Geneviève Dassoin	(episode: Quem Muito se Abaixa...)
2008	Água na Boca	Françoise Cassoulet	
2009	Toma Lá, Dá Cá	Geneviève Dassoin	(episode: As Duas Faces de Celinha)
2010	Ribeirão do Tempo	Eleonora Durrel	
2011	Aquele Beijo	Mirta Lemos de Sá	
2014	Now Generation	Bérénice	
2015	Babilônia	Simone Lauzier	
2020	Salve-se Quem Puder	Gracita Romantini	

=== Film ===
Year	Series	Role	Notes
1967	O Mundo Alegre de Helô		
1970	Parafernália, o Dia da Caça		
1977	Gente Fina É Outra Coisa		
1978	Batalha dos Guararapes		
1978	Nos Embalos de Ipanema		
1982	Menino do Rio		
1988	Natal da Portela		
1990	Sonho de Verão		
1991	Estação Aurora		
1994	Veja Esta Canção		
1994	Dente por Dente		
1995	Butterfly		
2008	Polaroides Urbanas		
2020	Jovens Polacas		
