= Françoise Forton =

Brazilian actress (1957–2022)

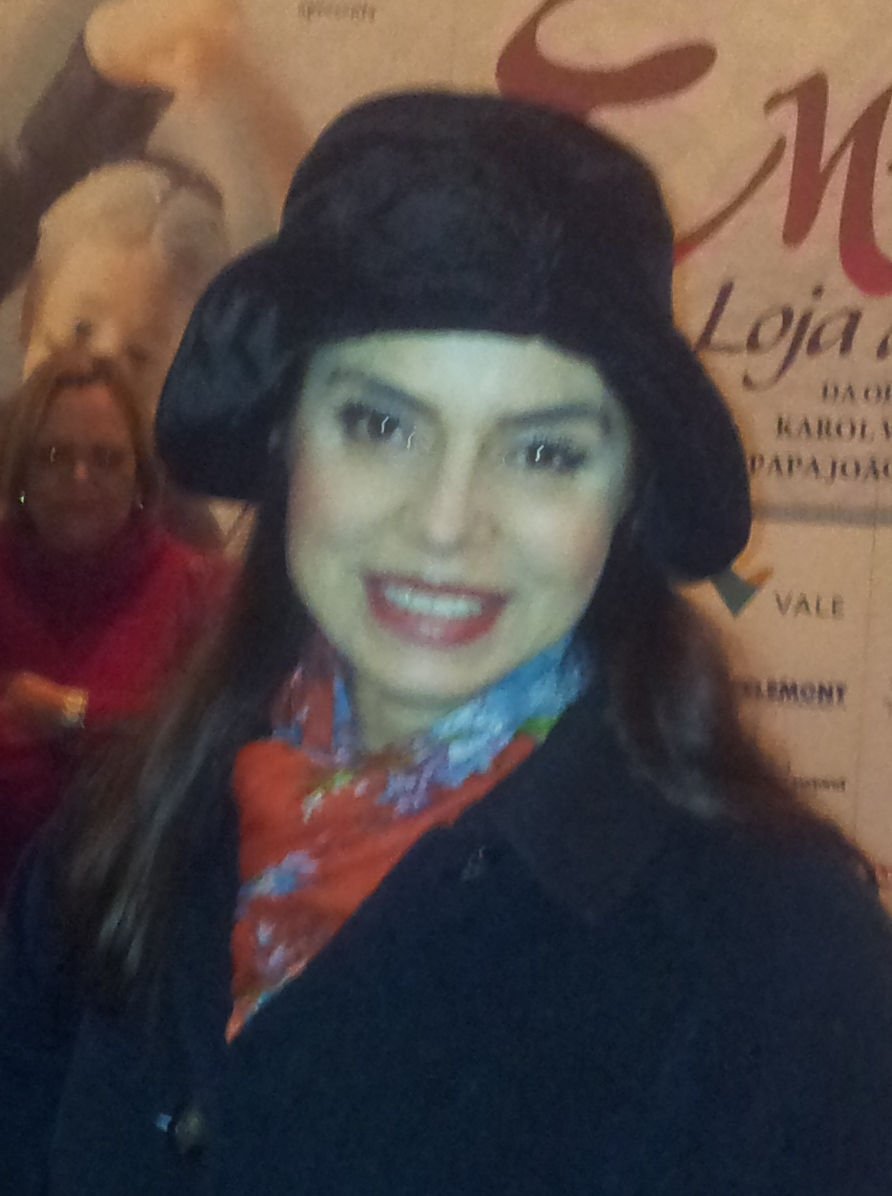
- Forton in 2012
- Born: 8 July 1957; Rio de Janeiro, Brazil
- Died: 16 January 2022 (aged 64); Rio de Janeiro, Brazil
- Occupation: Actress
- Years active: 1965–1977, 1983–2021
- Spouses: Ênio Viotti (m. 1978; div. 1982) Eduardo Barata (m. 2014)
- Children: 1

Françoise Forton (8 July 1957 – 16 January 2022) was a Brazilian actress.

== Career ==
The actress was the daughter of a French father and a Brazilian mother. She began her career as an actress in 1969, making a small contribution to the soap opera A Última Valsa. She then participated in an episode of the series A Grande Família in 1973, playing Tuco's girlfriend (Luiz Armando Queiroz). It gained more notoriety in television with the soap opera Fogo sobre Terra in 1974, playing the rebellious Estrada-de-Fogo. Since then, she has been in the cast of several telenovelas, always with important roles.

In 1975, she starred in Cuca Legal alongside Francisco Cuoco, Yoná Magalhães and Suely Franco. In the plot, she was one of the three women of Mário Barroso (Francisco Cuoco), Virgínia. In the same year, she was part of the cast of "Ode to ten", O Grito , where she played the activist Mariana, who was fighting for the rights of women and minorities.

The following year, 1976, she starred in Estúpido Cupido, a novel set in the 1960s. Her character, Maria Tereza, is a dreamy girl who wants to leave Albuquerque to be chosen Miss Brazil. However, her boyfriend João (Ricardo Blat), an aspiring journalist, is extremely jealous and intends to marry her, hindering in her plans. After the end of that soap opera, Françoise spent seven years away from television. In 1983 she transferred to Rede Bandeirantes where she was in the soap opera Sabor de Mel and the series Casa de Irene.

She returned to Rede Globo in 1988, participating in the soap opera Bebê a Bordo, where she played the sensual Glória, acting alongside Nicette Bruno, Patricya Travassos and Tony Ramos. In 1989 she played one of the villains of the great success Tieta, giving life to the cold and calculating Helena, wife of Ascânio (Reginaldo Faria). In 1990 she returned to act in another novel of prime time, in Meu Bem, Meu Mal, playing the mysterious Marcela.

In 1992, she played one of the main characters of Perigosas Peruas, the ambitious and dangerous Caroline. In 1993 she participated in Sonho Meu. In 1994 she played the frustrated nurse Clarisse in Quatro por Quatro, of Carlos Lombardi, in which she was in a romantic pair with Rômulo Arantes. The following year, Françoise won one of the main roles of the soap opera Explode Coração, the first soap opera to be recorded at the newly opened Projac. In the plot she was the great villain Eugênia Avelar, an exquisitely beautiful and cold woman, in love with the protagonist Júlio (Edson Celulari), who did everything to conquer him.

In 1996 she integrated the cast of the novel Anjo de Mim, giving life to elegant Renata Monterrey, one of the central characters of the plot. In 1997 she returned to prime time in the successful Por Amor, of Manoel Carlos, where she played the futile Meg.

Three years later, 2000, she returned to soap operas in Uga-Uga, living as hippie Larissa Guerra. In 2001 she participated in O Clone as secretary Simone. In 2003 she was in Kubanacan as the futile Concheta. After the end of the soap opera, Françoise joined SBT, where she recorded two remakes of Mexican soap operas with important roles, Seus Olhos, in 2004, and Os Ricos Também Choram, in 2005. She then signed a contract with Rede Record where she remained until the year of 2011, during which time she participated in several soap operas and serials of the network, such as Cidadão Brasileiro, Luz do Sol and Ribeirão do Tempo.

In 2012 she returned to Rede Globo, after a season at Rede Record.

== Personal life and death ==
Forton was of French descent. She lived in Brasília from the age of 5 until she was 17.

She was married to the physicist Ênio Viotti for four years, and from this marriage she had her only son, Guilherme. In 2014, Françoise married theater producer Eduardo Barata.

Forton died in Rio de Janeiro on 16 January 2022, at the age of 64.

== Filmography ==
=== Television ===
Year	Title	Role	Notes
1969	A Última Valsa		Special participation
1973	A Grande Família	Tuco's Girlfriend	Special participation
1974	Fogo sobre Terra	Estrada de Ferro	
1975	Cuca Legal	Virgínia Viana	
1975	O Grito	Marisa	
1976	Estúpido Cupido	Maria Tereza Oliveira (Tetê)	
1983	Sabor de Mel	Rebeca	
1983	Casa de Irene	Gina	
1988	Bebê a Bordo	Glória Ladeira	
1989	Tieta	Helena	
1990	Meu Bem, Meu Mal	Marcela Miranda	
1991	O Portador	Patrícia	
1992	Perigosas Peruas	Caroline	
1993	O Mapa da Mina	Fernanda Sabino	Episode: "March 29, 1993"
1993	Sonho Meu	Gilda Fontana	
1994	Quatro por Quatro	Clarisse	
1995	Explode Coração	Eugênia Avelar	
1996	Anjo de Mim	Renata Monterrey	
1997	Você Decide	Natália	Episode: "Cobiça"
1997	Por Amor	Margarida Saboya Trajano (Meg)	
1998	Labirinto	Wanda Camargo	
2000	Uga-Uga	Larissa Guerra	
2001	O Clone	Simone	
2002	O Quinto dos Infernos	Miou-Miou	
2003	Kubanacan	Concheta Ibarra	
2004	Seus Olhos	Elaine	
2005	Os Ricos Também Choram	Arabela Guedes	
2006	Cidadão Brasileiro	Manuela Gama	Phase 2
2007	Luz do Sol	Belquiss Lins de Albuquerque	
2008	Caminhos do Coração	Judge	Episodes: "May 30–June 2, 2008"
2009	Promessas de Amor	Cristina Dorange / Estela Dorange	
2010	Ribeirão do Tempo	Dirce Flores	Episodes: "May 18–24, 2010"
2010	Louca Família	Maria Estela Silva (Estelinha)	
2013	Amor à Vida	Gisela Borba de Andrada Lemos (Gigi)	
2014	As Canalhas	Bárbara	Episode: "Julia, A Secretária Ambiciosa"
2014	Sexo e as Negas	Marisinha Bengston de Castro	Episodes: "O Encaixe" / "Alguns Sonhos"
2015	I Love Paraisópolis	Isolda	
2015	Dança dos Famosos 12	Participant	Domingão do Faustão's reality show
2017	Prata da Casa	Hercília Ribeiro	
2017	Tempo de Amar	Emília Macedo	

=== Films ===
Year	Title	Role
1970	Marcelo Zona Sul	Renata
1974	Relatório de Um Homem Casado	Norma
1975	O Sósia da Morte	Cláudia
1988	Jardim de Alah	Denise
1991	Manobra Radical	
2004	Araguaya - A Conspiração do Silêncio	Dora
2010	Léo e Bia	Mother of Bia
2017	Coração de Cowboy	Iolanda
