= Fogo sobre Terra =

- Genre: Telenovela
- Created by: Janete Clair
- Directed by: Walther Avancini; Vinicius de Moraes
- Starring: Regina Duarte; Jardel Filho; Juca de Oliveira; Dina Sfat; Marcos Paulo; Fúlvio Stefanini; Edson França; Sônia Braga; Herval Rossano; Neuza Amaral; Gilberto Martinho; Jayme Barcellos; Ida Gomes; Françoise Forton
- Opening theme: "Fogo sobre Terra" - Coral Som Livre
- Country of origin: Brazil
- Original language: Portuguese
- No. of episodes: 209

Production
- Running time: 50 minutes

Original release
- Network: TV Globo
- Release: 8 May 1974 – 4 January 1975

Fogo sobre Terra is a Brazilian telenovela produced and broadcast by TV Globo. It premiered on 8 May 1974 and ended on 4 January 1975, with a total of 209 episodes in Black and white. It's the fourteenth "novela das oito" to be aired on the timeslot. It is created and written by Janete Clair and directed by Walter Avancini and Daniel Filho.

== Plot ==
At the end of the 1950s, two brothers separated in childhood meet again as rivals, deciding the fate of a town and vying for the love of the same woman. Pedro (Juca de Oliveira) and Diogo (Jardel Filho), sons of farmers from Mato Grosso, were separated at the age of three after losing their parents in a plane crash. Pedro was raised by his aunt Nara in Divineia, a fictional town in the backlands of Mato Grosso, while Diogo was taken to Rio de Janeiro and raised by engineer Heitor Gonzaga, Nara's ex-lover.

In Rio, Diogo attended the best schools and developed a practical temperament that led him to graduate in engineering and become a very successful professional, hired by Heitor Gonzaga's company, from whom he adopted his surname and whom he treats as his father. He was married and had a daughter, but he carries guilt in his conscience for the death of his ex-wife, who committed suicide shortly after their separation.

In Divineia, Pedro Azulão was brought up by Juliano (Ênio Santos) - pilot of the plane in which his parents died - and learned from an early age to take care of his father's business, establishing himself as the cattle drover who owned most of the land in his region. Valiant, with an explosive temper and respected as an authority by the locals, he shows his love for the town, named after his mother, by austerely guarding outsiders and travelers who happen to cross his territory.

Representing these two realities - modernity and tradition, the urban and the rural - the two brothers meet again 30 years later, when Heitor Gonzaga's company sends Diogo to Mato Grosso to head up the construction of a dam on the site occupied by Divineia. Located on the banks of the Jurapori River, the town was to be flooded by the river's waters. Its inhabitants would then be relocated to another town, to be built kilometers down the road, where they could enjoy the benefits of soil irrigation provided by the dam. Pedro Azulão, however, doesn't want to pay the price of seeing his town disappear in favor of progress he doesn't believe in and encourages the population to protest against the project.

While trying to convince Pedro that he is proposing the best for the city, Diogo meets and falls in love with Chica Martins (Dina Sfat), his brother's childhood sweetheart. The woman, who becomes the object of the two brothers' dispute, grew up dreaming of being rich and living in the big city and therefore hates anything that reminds her of her humble origins. She even hates her own name, to the point of saying “Débora” when introduced to strangers. In the past, she even abandoned Pedro Azulão to run away with a farmer passing through town, but regretted it and returned. At first, her interest in Diogo lies mainly in the prospect of leaving Divineia to live in the big city, but then she falls in love with the engineer.

Accompanying Diogo, young Bárbara (Regina Duarte) also arrives in Divineia. She is the daughter that Heitor Gonzaga (Jayme Barcellos) had with Nara (Neuza Amaral) when she was 16. She was taken as a child to the big city and raised by her father, who never told her the truth about her mother's identity. Her greatest tragedy is the frequent nervous breakdowns that cause her psychological blindness, a consequence of the trauma of being estranged from her mother. In Divineia, she gets closer to Pedro and Nara and, through her relationship with them, manages to overcome her problem. Nara gradually takes her place in her daughter's heart, until she reveals the truth to her. And Pedro falls in love with the girl, who ends up being the reason why he abandons the conflict with his brother.

In the course of the plot, while the engineers begin preparations for the demolition of the city, Pedro Azulão tries everything he can to stop his brother from carrying out his efforts. As a result, he ends up temporarily imprisoned. When he is released, he becomes convinced that it is useless to resist and decides to lock himself in his house and let himself be carried away by the waters, as a form of protest. But Bárbara reveals that she is expecting his child and asks him to think of the child's happiness. Overcome with emotion, Pedro leaves town. In the final chapter, progress triumphs and Divineia is submerged by the waters of the river Jurapori. Nara, who insists on staying in the town, dies in the flood.

== Reception ==
Critic Valério Almeida, evaluating the telenovela's first month, praised the plot for being “better elaborated and less fanciful than O Semideus”, highlighting the direction and the participation of Dina Sfat.

== Cast ==
- Juca de Oliveira - Pedro Fonseca (Pedro Azulão)
- Regina Duarte - Bárbara Gonzaga
- Dina Sfat - Francisca Peixoto Martins (Chica Martins)
- Jardel Filho - Diogo
- Neuza Amaral - Nara
- Fúlvio Stefanini - Gustavo de Almeida
- Edson França - Nilo Gato
- Marcos Paulo - André
- Sônia Braga - Brisa
- Herval Rossano - Arthur Braga
- Gilberto Martinho - Zé Martins
- Aracy Cardoso - Dra. Lisa
- Ida Gomes - Frida
- Dary Reis - Tonho
- Léa Garcia - Tiana
- Jayme Barcellos - Dr. Heitor Gonzaga
- Darcy de Souza - Ivone
- Germano Filho - Quebra-Galho
- Tamara Taxman - Jamile
- Isaac Bardavid - Salin
- Tony Ferreira - Delegado Amaro
- Lícia Magna - Isabel
- Ênio Santos - Juliano
- Françoise Forton - Estrada de Ferro
- Maria Zilda Bethlem - Maria Fumaça
- Roberto Bomfim - Saul
- Mary Daniel - Dona Hilda Maria
- Jorge Cherques - Coronel João Aires de Brito
- Edson Silva - Kalin
- Ada Chaseliov - Maria Paula
- Monique Lafond - Judi
- Hélio Ary - Custódio
- Lourdinha Bittencourt - Sueli
- Rosana Garcia - Vivi
- Ricardo Garcia Costa - Ônibus
- José Miziara - Amadeu
- Dartagnan Mello - Bicho Brabo
- Regina Linhares - Mimi
- Carapanã - Tamaê
