= Razão de Viver (1996) =

Brazilian telenovela by Sistema Brasileiro de Televisão

- Genre: Telenovela; Crime drama; Romance
- Created by: Analy Alvarez; Zeno Wilde
- Directed by: Antonino Seabra; Bete Coelho; Del Rangel
- Starring: Irene Ravache Fúlvio Stefanini Joana Fomm Adriana Esteves Marco Ricca Mayara Magri Ana Paula Arósio Eduardo Conde
- Opening theme: "Redescobrir" by Elis Regina
- Composer: Gonzaguinha
- Country of origin: Brazil
- Original language: Portuguese
- No. of episodes: 168

Production
- Production locations: Santo Amaro, São Paulo, Brazil
- Running time: 50 minutes

Original release
- Network: SBT
- Release: 6 May – 6 December 1996

Razão de Viver is a Brazilian telenovela produced and broadcast by SBT between May 6 and December 6, 1996, in 168 chapters. It replaced Sangue do Meu Sangue and was replaced by Dona Anja.

It was written by Analy Alvarez and Zeno Wilde, with the collaboration of Nara Gomes, text supervision by Chico de Assis, under the direction of Antonino Seabra, Bete Coelho, and Del Rangel and general direction by Nilton Travesso and Henrique Martins actor. It is a remake of the Brazilian telenovela Meus Filhos, Minha Vida, written by Ismael Fernandes in 1984.

The cast includes Irene Ravache, Fúlvio Stefanini, Joana Fomm, Adriana Esteves, Marco Ricca, Mayara Magri, Ana Paula Arósio, and Eduardo Conde in the lead roles.

== Production ==
In 1995, SBT decided to produce a remake of Meus Filhos, Minha Vida (1985), the first original soap opera shown by the channel a decade earlier, after nine adaptations of Mexican texts. Ismael Fernandes, the author of the original, was asked to adapt the new version to the language and themes of the moment, but he refused due to other projects.

Roda da Fortuna, Pedaço de Mim, Amor de Mãe, and A Dona do Jogo, were all considered for name the remake, which ended up being renamed Razão de Viver - a title that SBT itself had already used for a 1983 soap opera, but with no relation to the one in question. Regina created new storylines to incorporate contemporary themes and sought inspiration from the conflict of family relationships in the film Laços de Ternura (1983). It was the first contemporary soap opera produced by SBT since it resumed dramaturgy in 1994. Actress Bete Coelho debuted as one of the soap opera's directors.

Recording began on March 10, 1996, and each chapter had a budget of 35,000 dollars.

=== Casting ===
The first actress to be cast in the soap opera was Adriana Esteves, who agreed to star alongside her husband, Marco Ricca. Esteves, known for her work on Rede Globo, expressed interest in working on a different network. Other personalities then signed a contract with SBT to act in Razão de Viver: Irene Ravache, Joana Fomm, Fúlvio Stefanini, and Mayara Magri. The production of Razão de Viver was shot in São Paulo, utilizing some existing set designs from previous productions, like Éramos Seis (1994).

The last actors chosen were Petrônio Gontijo and Cláudia Liz, who took lessons at a driving school to learn how to drive a motorcycle, which was necessary for the construction of the plot.

== Plot ==
In Santo Amaro, a suburb of São Paulo, lives Luzia (Irene Ravache), an honest, hard-working widow who has raised her three children alone: André (Marco Ricca), Mário (Gabriel Braga Nunes) and Pedro (Petrônio Gontijo). She works as a seamstress for Yara (Joana Fomm), an arrogant fashion designer married to the wealthy Pascoal (Sebastião Campos), who has been having an affair with Álvaro (Eduardo Conde) for years and starts to make the maid miserable when her lover falls in love with her. Luzia, however, rediscovers love in maturity when she meets Renato (Fúlvio Stefanini), a delegate who finds himself at a moral crossroads, as he is investigating the jewel theft gang run by her son Mario and his friend Ruffo (Raul Gazolla).

André is an ambitious young man who has always dreamed of a luxurious life and, despite falling in love with the talented seamstress Zilda (Adriana Esteves), decides to seduce the moneyed Olga (Mayara Magri), Yara's daughter. Deceived, Zilda prepares to marry André without imagining that she will be abandoned, while Olga believes she has found the man of her life without knowing about the scam. The one who secretly loves Zilda is Pedro, Luzia's only honest son, a romantic and shy mechanic who is the target of the funny Júnia (Cláudia Liz), a biker who has always done everything to conquer him. Alcides (Gianfrancesco Guarnieri) is a social worker who tries to get Pata (Fernanda Souza), Rato (Luciano Amaral actor), and Nino (Rafael Pardo) out of a criminal life. Bruna (Ana Paula Arósio) is an aspiring model who ends up involved with Ruffo and used by him to attract targets for his gang, much to the dismay of her sister, Silvia (Vera Zimmermann), an embittered woman who lives as a prostitute to feed them both.

== Cast ==
Actor	Character
Irene Ravache	Luzia Santos
Fúlvio Stefanini	Renato Bragança
Joana Fomm	Yara Montenegro
Adriana Esteves	Zilda Ferreira
Marco Ricca	André Santos
Mayara Magri	Olga Montenegro
Eduardo Conde	Álvaro Montenegro
Petrônio Gontijo	Pedro Santos
Gabriel Braga Nunes	Mário Santos
Ana Paula Arósio	Bruna Sampaio
Vera Zimmermann	Sílvia Sampaio
Raul Gazolla	Ruffo
Gianfrancesco Guarnieri	Alcides
Lolita Rodrigues	Carmem
Bel Kutner	Rosa Bragança
Cláudia Liz	Júnia
Cassio Scapin	Miro
Sebastião Campos	Pascoal Montenegro
Cláudia Mello	Jandira
Ernando Tiago	Rafael
Cléo Ventura	Deise
Patrícia Mayo	Vitória
Elizabeth Hartmann	Gretel
Eliana Rocha	Rosely
Paulo Hesse	Humphery
Ju Colombo	Vitória
Paulo de Almeida	Arcílio Quinto
Tânia Sekler	Guiomar
Lu Martan	Alípio
Josmar Martins	Eduardo
Fernanda Souza	Pata
Luciano Amaral	Rato
Aretha Oliveira	Fabiana
Rafael Pardo	Nino

=== Special guests ===
Actor	Character
Henrique Martins	Raul Macedo
André Latorre	Dauri
Adão Filho	Zé Carlos
Nívio Diegues	Jordão
Guilherme Linhares	Jô

== Broadcast ==
The telenovela was scheduled to start airing in March 1996, but the broadcaster decided to postpone it in order to air Colégio Brasil and Antônio Alves, Taxista simultaneously, replacing Sangue do Meu Sangue. Its first chapter was aired on May 6, in the 9 pm slot on SBT. Broadcast from Monday to Saturday, its last episode was aired on December 6, 1996, with a total of 168 chapters.

Due to the broadcast of the 1996 Summer Olympics, which took place from July 19 to August 4, Razão de Viver was no longer shown on some days and fitted into the programming schedule on others. The telenovela's soundtrack received no attention from the broadcaster, which did not release a CD with the three songs reproduced in the show: “Redescobrir”, by Elis Regina (the opening theme); “Mais Simples”, by Zizi Possi and “Ternura do Gesto”, by Ivan Lins.

== Reception ==
=== Audience ===
Following a sequence of soap operas with audience averages above 12 points, Luciano Callegari, SBT's artistic superintendent, set a target of at least 10 points for Razão de Viver. The premiere, however, scored 9 points, three less than Sangue do Meu Sangue. After changing the timeslot due to the 1996 Summer Olympics, the show experienced a decline in audience numbers and averaged between 6 and 8 points. Double digits were only achieved in the last two months of the soap opera when it reached 11 points on certain days, but the overall average was 8 points.

=== Evaluation in retrospect ===
Journalist Ana Cláudia Souza, from Jornal do Brasil, praised the production of Razão de Viver: “Quality lighting, well-assembled sets, good costumes and, best of all, lots of talented actors on screen. As everyone has been used to watching soap operas since they were born, the main thing in a new production is to put familiar faces on screen, people with whom the audience can immediately identify. And that wasn't lacking in SBT's production." Rogério Durst, from O Globo, said that Razão de Viver was the only good soap opera of the three premiered by SBT on the same day — Colégio Brasil and Antônio Alves, Taxista — and that it had aesthetic care that wasn't present in the others: "[It was made] with a certain care and a lot of emotion, in that kind of bland but well-made and still tasty style of teledramaturgy that [the broadcaster] has maintained since Éramos Seis. Reporter Luiz Augusto Michelazzo, for the same newspaper, called Adriana Esteves the “heroine of the drama.”

Erika Palomino, from Folha de S. Paulo, compared the characterization of the characters with the script, declaring it to be well constructed. Telmo Martino, also from O Globo, gave a neutral assessment, saying that the soap opera was complicated and that anyone needed to watch at least ten chapters to understand it. However, Luiz Carlos Merten, from Estado de S. Paulo, was critical, saying that the characters were stereotyped as “the rich bad guy and the poor good guy.”
