= Sétimo Sentido =

- Genre: Telenovela
- Created by: Janete Clair
- Directed by: Roberto Talma
- Starring: Regina Duarte; Francisco Cuoco; Carlos Alberto Riccelli; Eva Todor; Paulo Guarnieri; Natália do Vale; Tamara Taxman; Armando Bógus; Fernando Torres; Beth Goulart; Nicette Bruno; Jacqueline Laurence; Sebastião Vasconcelos; Ruth de Souza
- Opening theme: "Vitrines" by Chico Buarque
- Country of origin: Brazil
- Original language: Portuguese
- No. of episodes: 167

Production
- Running time: 50 minutes

Original release
- Network: TV Globo
- Release: 29 March – 8 October 1982

Related
- Brilhante; Sol de Verão

Sétimo Sentido is a Brazilian telenovela produced and broadcast by TV Globo. It premiered on 29 March 1982 and ended on 8 October 1982, with a total of 167 episodes. It was the twenty-eighth "novela das oito" to be aired on the timeslot. It is created and written by Janete Clair and directed by Roberto Talma.

== Plot ==
Moroccan Luana Camará returns to Brazil to try to recover her fortune stolen by the Rivoredo family. In the past, Antônio Rivoredo transferred the assets of Luana's parents to his name when they were forced into exile due to political problems. The Camará family's assets, however, were never returned. Tião Bento, Antônio's right-hand man, was the mastermind behind the scams against the Camará family. After the old man's death, Tião wants to take over the family's companies and money, becoming Luana's main antagonist. With a dubious and seductive character, he has a curious habit: he keeps a shoe from every woman he seduces.

However, Tião Bento faces opposition from Sandra Rivoredo, Antônio's eldest daughter, who is ready to replace her father in the business. She is the president of the family's industries and does everything she can to remove Tião from the management of the company. Good-natured and responsible, Sandra even gives up her personal life for the sake of business. Another Rivoredo crosses Luana's path: Rudi, Sandra's brother, with whom she falls in love. However, the path is not clear, as he is married to the possessive Helenice. Rudi is also swayed by Luana, which ends up worsening his relationship with her. Unmotivated amidst so many obstacles, Luana decides to return to Morocco.

Luana, who had already been showing signs of paranormal activity, such as visions of future situations, ends up undergoing a radical transformation: she takes on the personality of the late Italian actress Priscila Capricce through mediumship and reappears in Brazil, astonishing everyone. Extroverted, sensual and bubbly, Priscila is nothing like Luana, except physically. Her spirit possesses Luana's body with the intention of finding her missing daughter and fulfilling a promise made in a past incarnation of both. Priscila manages to seduce Tião Bento and the two end up getting married. At certain moments, however, Priscila's spirit leaves Luana's body.

Tião Bento does not understand the sudden changes in his wife's behavior, whom he believes to be Priscila. Upon discovering that Priscila Capricce had died and that his wife is actually Luana Camará, Tião is willing to help her, revealing that he has always loved Luana, becoming her greatest ally and protector. To recover her assets, Luana enlists the help of Danilo Mendes, who obtains access to documents that prove that the Camará family is the legitimate owner of the Rivoredo family's assets and files a lawsuit claiming Luana's assets. On the day of the trial, Luana returns to being Priscila and Tião Bento's testimony gives Luana the upper hand.

== Cast ==
- Regina Duarte - Luana Camará/Priscilla Capricce
- Francisco Cuoco - Sebastião Bento (Tião Bento)
- Eva Todor - Maria Santa Bergman Rivoredo (Santinha Rivoredo)
- Carlos Alberto Riccelli - Rodolfo Bergman Rivoredo (Rudy)
- Cláudio Cavalcanti - Danilo Mendes
- Natália do Vale - Sandra Bergman Rivoredo
- Tamara Taxman - Gisela Rezende (Gisa)
- Fernando Torres - Harold Bergman
- Armando Bógus - Valério
- Beth Goulart - Helenice
- Paulo Guarnieri - Antônio Bergman Rivoredo (Tony)
- Nicette Bruno - Sara Mendes
- Sebastião Vasconcelos - Elísio Mendes
- Ênio Santos - Tomás Rezende
- Heloísa Helena - Augusta
- Ruth de Souza - Jerusa
- Adriano Reys - Renard
- Lisa Vieira - Érika Rezende
- Otávio Augusto - Jorge
- Myriam Pérsia - Mapy Hilder
- Edwin Luisi - Rubens
- Jonas Bloch - Jaime
- Jacqueline Laurence - Célia
- Miriam Pires - Carolina
- Edney Giovenazzi - Sampaio
- Maria Della Costa - Juliana
- Jacyra Silva - Pérola
- Lajar Muzuris - Domingos
- Irma Alvarez - Vanda
- Reinaldo Gonzaga - Gilson Pratini
- Sônia Clara - Diana Bergman
- Terezinha Sodré - Rita
- Fernando Eiras - Henrique Bergman
- Neuza Caribé - Uiara
- Tânia Boscoli - Alba Rezende
- David Pinheiro - Padre Gustavo
- Monique Alves - Rosinha
- Patrícia Phebo - Cristina
- Cássia Foureaux - Ângela
- Nilson Acioly - Kico
- Izabella Bicalho - Cila
