= Mangue Seco =

Beach village in Bahia, Brazil

Coordinates: 11°40′40″S 37°30′30″W

Mangue seco village, May 2008

Mangue Seco is a beach village in Jandaíra, Bahia, Brazil. It is famous in Brazil because of a soap-opera (telenovela) adaptation of the novel Tieta do Agreste, by the Brazilian writer Jorge Amado, which was shot on its white beaches in 1996.

== Location ==
Mangue Seco is located in the northern coast of the state of Bahia, very close to the border with the state of Sergipe. The village lies near the river that marks the border between the two states, the Real River. It is located about 80 km southwest from the city of Aracaju (Sergipe's capital). It can be reached by a 15-min boat trip from three different ports: Porto do Mato, Terra Caida and Pontal.

== Tourism ==
The village itself consists of a small fishing village, and has approximately 300 inhabitants. Among the main touristic attractions are the beaches, the buggy trips on the sand dunes and the small, typical Brazilian church.
