= Tamara Taxman =

Brazilian actress

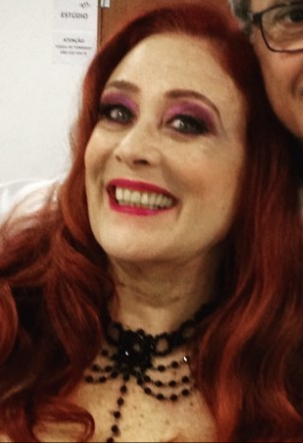
- Taxman in 2018
- Born: Tamara de Braga Taxman; 24 February 1947 (age 79); Woodstock, New York, U.S.
- Occupations: Actress; singer; television presenter; writer
- Years active: 1972–present
- Children: Henrique Taxman

Tamara de Braga Taxman (born February 24, 1947) is a Brazilian actress, singer, television presenter and writer. She is best known for portraying the witch Leocádia, in the children's TV series Detetives do Prédio Azul.

== Biography ==
Taxman was born in Woodstock, Illinois. Her father was from Rock Island and her mother was from Varginha, Minas Gerais. She went to Brazil at the age of three months.

== Filmography ==
=== Television ===
Year	Title	Role
1972	Selva de Pedra	Madalena Ribeiro
1972	Uma Rosa com Amor	Ercy Andrade
1974	Fogo sobre Terra	Jamile
1976	Vejo a Lua no Céu	Margarida
1976	O Casarão	Nurse
1977	À Sombra dos Laranjais	Dalva Alvarez
1978	Sinal de Alerta	Geórgia
1980	Água Viva	Selma
1982	Sétimo Sentido	Giza Resende
1985	Um Sonho a Mais	Dorothy Gordon (Doroteia Gondim)
1985	De Quina pra Lua	Sílvia
1989	Kananga do Japão	Zazá
1989	Capitães de Areia	Dalva
1990	A História de Ana Raio e Zé Trovão	Dolores Estrada
1992	Ser...Tão Brasileiro	TV presenter
1994	74.5: Uma Onda no Ar	Brigitte
1995	Malhação	Maria Eudóxia
1996	Caça Talentos	Aretuza
1996	O Fim do Mundo	Clotilde
1997	Direito de Vencer	Yolanda
1998	Alma de Pedra	Norma
2000	Aquarela do Brasil	Elisa
2002	O Quinto dos Infernos	Augusta da Baviera
2004	Senhora do Destino	Madame Mirthes
2006	Páginas da Vida	Dalva
2008	Ciranda de Pedra	Maria Emília
2008	Casos e Acasos	Strip teacher
2010	Afinal, o Que Querem as Mulheres?	Dona Renatinha
2011	Insensato Coração	Florinda
2012—17	Detetives do Prédio Azul	Leocádia Leal
2013	Copa Hotel	Lúcia
2015	Santo Forte	Moa
2016	Rock Story	Vanda

=== Film ===
Year	Title	Role
1977	Ladrões de Cinema	
1978	A Batalha dos Guararapes	
1978	A Noiva da Cidade	
1980	Cabaret Mineiro	Salinas
1982	Aventuras de um Paraíba	Débora
1982	Luz del Fuego	Iara Satã
1982	Os Campeões	
1983	Flor do Desejo	Lady
1983	Um Sedutor Fora de Série	
1985	A Hora da Estrela	Glória
1987	Romance da Empregada	Fausta's maid
1998	Discretion Assured	Pandora
2014	O Lobo Atrás da Porta	
2016	Maresia	participation
2017	D.P.A - O Filme	Leocádia Leal

=== Stage ===
Title
Alice no País Divino Maravilhoso
Hair
Arena Contra Zumbi
Adorável Júlia
Grande Hotel
Férias Extra-Conjugais
Os Japoneses Não Esperam
Toalhas Quentes
Sinal de Vida
