= Jandaíra =

Municipality of Bahia, Brazil

- Municipality
- The Municipality of Jandaíra
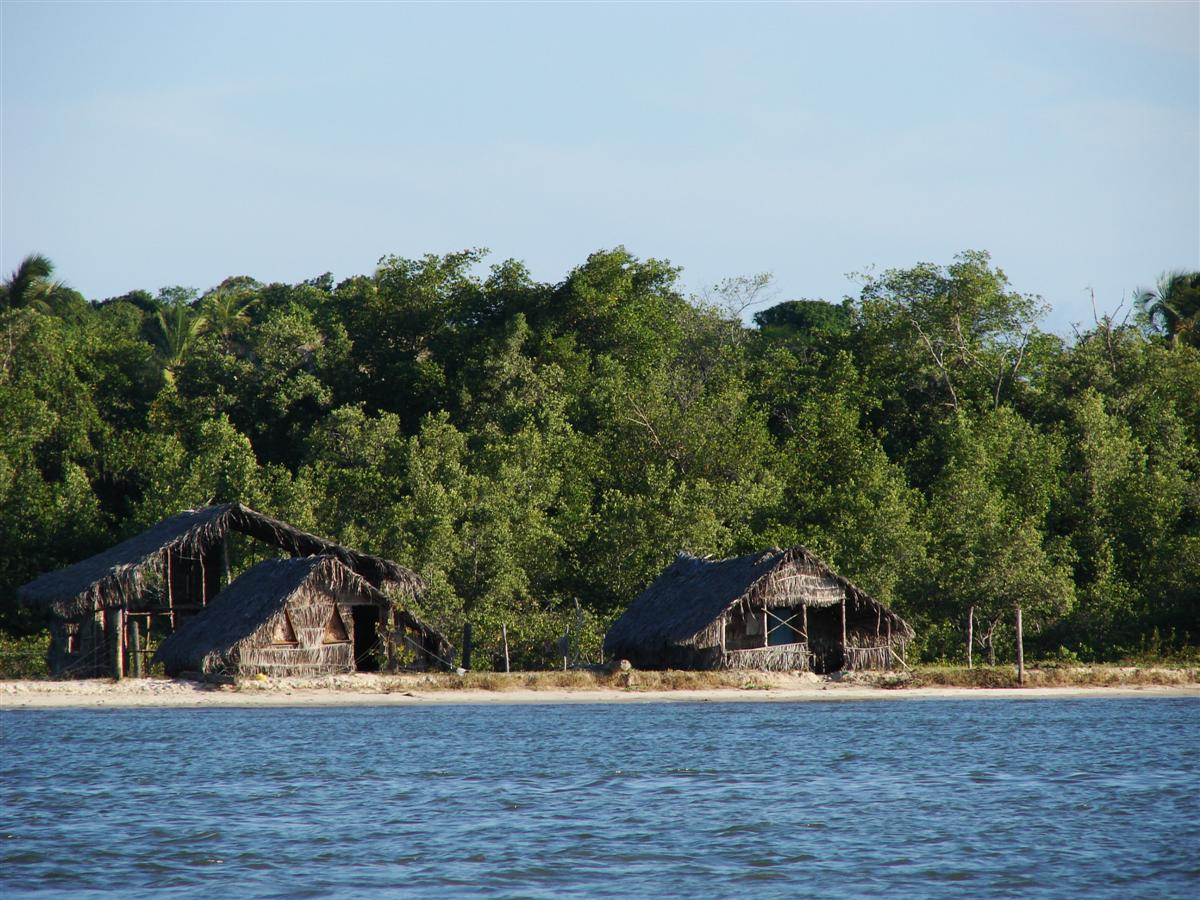
- Mangue seco beach in Jandaíra.

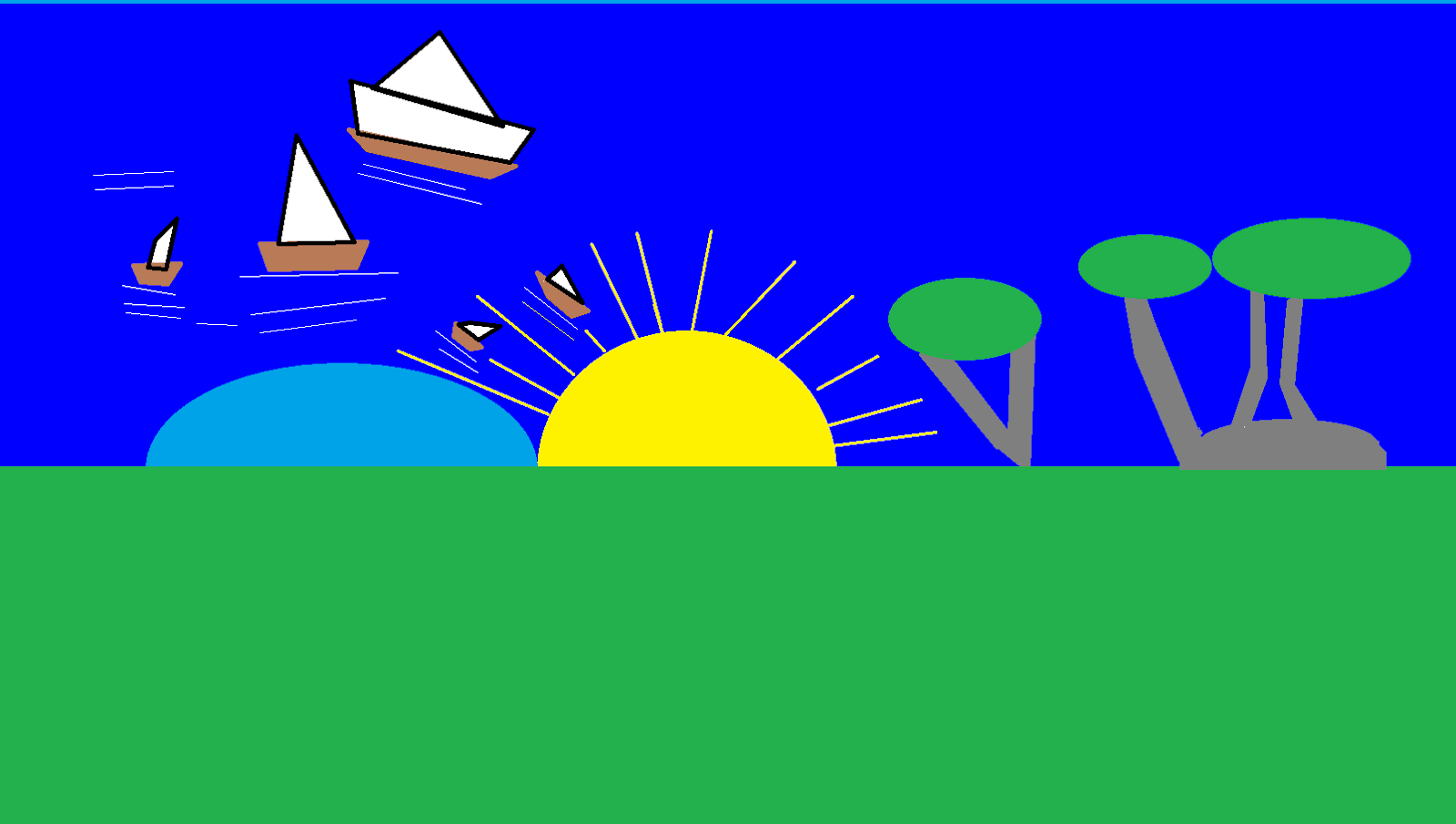
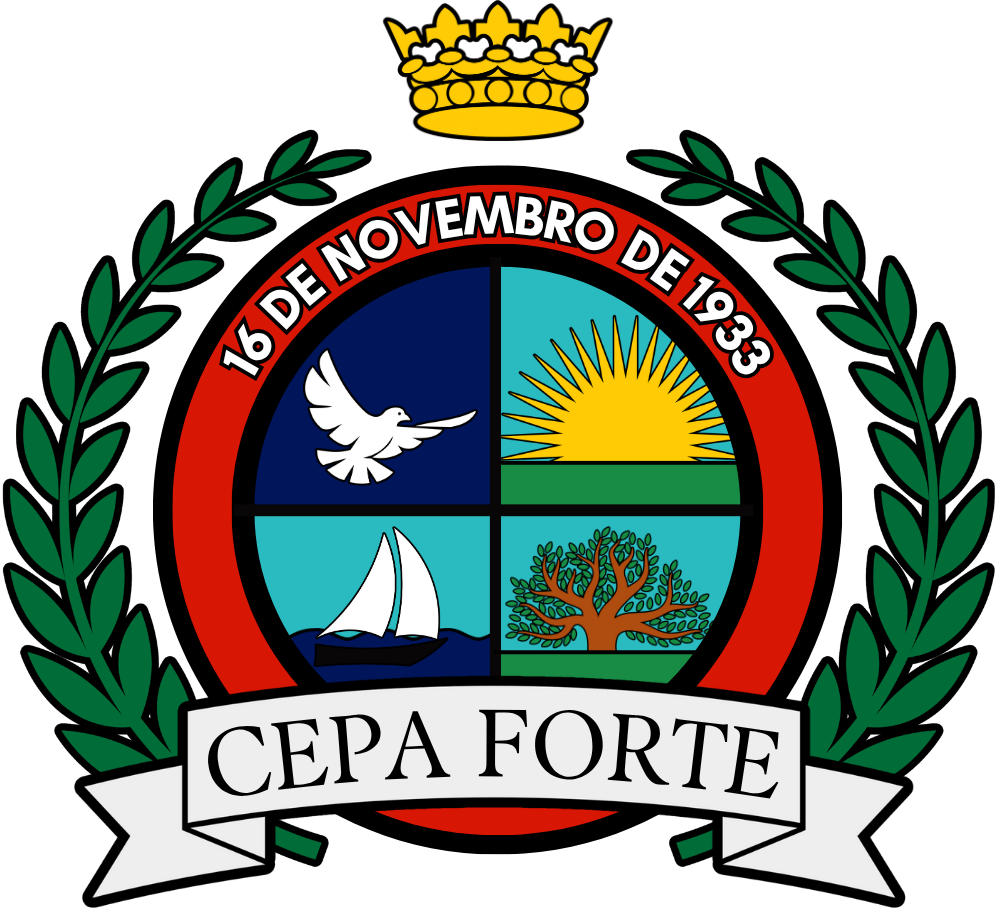
- Flag Coat of arms

- Location in Bahia
- Coordinates: 11°33′50″S 37°47′02″W
- Country: Brazil
- Region: Northeast
- State: Bahia
- Founded: July 6, 1832

Government
  - Mayor: João Alves dos Santos

Area
  - Total: 642.652 km^{2} (248.129 sq mi)

Population (2020)
  - Total: 10,726
  - Density: 17.6/km^{2} (46/sq mi)
- Time zone: UTC−3 (BRT)
  - Summer (DST): UTC11° 33' 50" S 37° 47' 02" O
- HDI (2000): 0.575 – medium

Jandaíra is the easternmost city in the Brazilian state of Bahia. The city is famous because of the Mangue seco village and beach.

== History ==
Among the main historical events in Jandaíra, the following stand out:

- 1548 — Settlement of nearby Vila de Santa Cruz da Bela Vista by a group of shipwrecked Jesuits, part of the modern-day beach village of Mangue Seco.
- 1718 — Elevation of the village to the category of parish.
- 1728 — Elevation of the parish to the category of village, with the name Abadia.
- 1927 — Abadia changes to the current name Jandaíraz.
- 1933 — Elevation to the category of municipality, with the title of Jandaíra.

== See also ==
- List of municipalities in Bahia
