= Pacto de Sangue =

Brazilian television series

- Genre: Crime drama
- Created by: Lucas Vivo
- Starring: Guilherme Fontes; Adriano Garib; Ravel Cabral; André Ramiro; Mel Lisboa
- Country of origin: Brazil
- Original language: Portuguese
- No. of seasons: 1
- No. of episodes: 8

Production
- Production locations: Belém, Pará
- Cinematography: Rodrigo Carvalho
- Production companies: Space; Intro Pictures

Original release
- Network: Space
- Release: August 27, 2018

Pacto de Sangue (transl. Blood Pact) is a Brazilian crime drama television series created by Lucas Vivo and produced by Intro Pictures loosely based on the real-life story of Wallace Souza, a Brazilian TV personality from Amazonas, who was accused of ordering a series of murders to improve the ratings of his crime show.

The first season, of eight episodes, was shown on Space in Brazil from August 2018, and on Netflix in some countries from October 2018.

== Plot ==
Silas Campello is a reporter for TV who achieves fame by hosting an interesting crime program on television in Pará. He tries to increase ratings by conspiring with his brother Edinho and some criminals to commit murders that he will report through his programs.

== Cast and characters ==
- Guilherme Fontes as Silas Campello
- Ravel Cabral as Roberto Moreira
- André Ramiro as Soares
- Jonathan Haagensen as Trucco
- Adriano Garib as Edinho
- Mel Lisboa as Gringa
- Paulo Miklos as Mauro Caceres
- Fúlvio Stefanini as Simão
- Gracindo Júnior as Amaral
- Cristina Lago as Renata
- Mika Guluzian as Mari Campello
- Sílvio Restiffe as Milton
- Adriano Bolshi as Batista
- Daniel Torres as Sacerdote
- Guilherme Rodio as Osmir

== Episodes ==
No.	Title	Original release date
1	"TV Novo Pará" "Novo Pará TV"	August 27, 2018
In Belém, TV reporter Silas Campello (Guilherme Fontes) and his cameraman (Fabio Yoshihara) wander into a community with the aid of his brother and officer Edinho (Adriano Garib) to interview a drug lord until a shootout ensues. Later, he is seen editing the footage and presenting it to his editor Simão (Fúlvio Stefanini), who rejects the story and says people are more interested in sports and celebrities news. Silas recurs to the TV channel owner, who immediately accepts the footage. The story is a huge success, although Simão is still skeptic about using it. Meanwhile, Silas' wife Vera (Simone Iliescu) pays a visit to their daughter Mari (Mika Guluzian), who is at a rehabilitation clinic. Both say they have no plans to get her out of there until the doctors recommend otherwise. Later, she is seen buying and taking smuggled drugs. Some women are seen kept in a cage. One of them is picked and put through some kind of sex ritual that ends up with one of them stabbed. Later, some boys play football near a shipwreck and stumble upon her body floating inside of it. Edinho meets fellow corrupt officer Mauro Caceres (Paulo Miklos), who gives him some money. Later, he meets a thug and demands a meeting with drug lord Trucco (Jonathan Haagensen). In São Paulo, police officer Roberto Moreira (Ravel Cabral) is seen winning a cachaça drinking competition. On the following day, his boss, sheriff Vinícius Santos (Gustavo Trestini), reprehends him for failing to catch some criminals. Later, Santos puts him in charge of a case involving the disappearance of a teenage girl – the one seen in the ritual – to give him a last chance before he is fired.
2	"A Floresta Não Tem Dono" "The Jungle Has No Owners"	August 27, 2018
Santos informs Moreira of the body and orders him to go to Belém investigate it. There, he is introduced to local sheriff Henrique Freitas (João Signorelli), who coldly informs him of the procedures, and to detective Lucas Soares (André Ramiro), his partner. They navigate through the river and stumble upon an illegal deforesting site, where they question the local boss for information. Soares pays a visit to his friend Batista (Adriano Bolshi) and asks him for directions to buy a special drug. Silas finds out about his daughter still taking drugs and is furious with the clinic for failing to keep her clean. As he leaves, one of the employees gives him the name of the nurse who smuggled the drugs. Later that night, he approaches her as she leaves for a smoke and punches her in the face. Edinho meets Trucco and offers him a deal, but the lord rejects it. Later, he is seen with the girls that are being put through the ritual. Three of them are seen hiding inside a small boat navigating a river. Eventually, some unidentified men gun the boat down, killing all the girls, the driver and the guard.
3	"Cardápio Completo" "Full Menu"	September 3, 2018
Silas and Edinho are seen as kids witnessing their drunk father arriving home and beating their mother. They profess their hatred for their father and are later seen beating him to death with a pipe. Back to the present time, Trucco blames Edinho for the attack on his boat, but Edinho reminds him he is only paid to keep official eyes away from him, not to prevent betrayals. The lord then demands him to find out who's been tipping him off. He finds out it is an experienced police officer and Trucco demands him to solve the situation. Soares and Moreira learn from Batista that there is a "spiritual tourism" company offering trips at websites only found on the deep web and that such company is apparently run by Marie Stephanie Pomeraniec, also known as "Gringa" – the woman seen with Trucco in the previous episode. Soares and Moreira try to interrogate a local woman whose daughter is among the victims of the boat incident but she aggressively asks them to leave. However, they manage to ask her younger son some questions. Later, they report the situation to Vinícius and request additional support to aid in the investigation, but he only concedes half of what they requested. They conclude the only way to learn more from the scheme is to take part of it, pretending to be tourists. They go to a bar and Moreira takes part of another drinking competition in order to win the necessary money. Silas and Simão interview Pará's secretary of public security Tadeu Alves and pressure him to explain the spike in crime rates around the state following escalating conflicts between factions. After asking his brother for something strong to show on his program, Silas and his cameraman film the moment the officer that's been tipping Trucco off is executed in front of his sons. They later use the image in the News. Meanwhile, Silas seduces his reporter Renata (Cristina Lago).
4	"Do Prazer à Morte" "From Pleasure to Death"	September 10, 2018
Some men are seeing secretly drugging a girl. Moreira is taken to a van by a child and then taken to Gringa's "spiritual tourism" experience. Amidst his trance, he disarms one of the guards and eliminates all the thugs, except for Gringa and one of her bodyguard, who manage to escape. Trucco orders her to suspend activities and recommends they find a new place. Silas is taken by the police live during his program so he is questioned by judge Sônia Barreto (Teca Pereira). Mari befriends Alex (Mateus Almada), a fellow drug addict who takes her outside via a secret passage and gives her some drugs he manages to smuggle into the facility. Silas come pay her a visit bytbut the local director says she doesn't want to see him. As he leaves the facility, he is kidnapped.
5	"Bruxa do Mal" "Evil Witch"	September 17, 2018
Silas earns his very own program, A Hora da Justiça (The Time of Justice). For the first edition, he pays a woman to pose as a widowed mother of three who had her husband killed by the police. Freitas reprehends Soares and Moreira for their incident with Gringa, but allows them to resume their work. They talk with Sônia, who's been after Trucco for a while. Later, Moreira goes to Platão's (Gero Camilo) nightclub and questions him about Gringa. Mari and Alex make another escape from the clinic and are watched by men in a car. As they make out nearby, the car approaches them and some men brutally beat Alex and tell Mari to send her father their "regards". Meanwhile, fearing further police attention in his area, Trucco decides to have Gringa terminated, but she flees to an isolated house by the river. She calls him and asks him for some cocaine and money so she can stay hidden. Trucco has his men deliver a bag to Gringa; she has her bodyguard collect it but it explodes as he touches it. She hides under her house and calls Sônia.
6	"Perna ou Braço?" "Leg or Arm?"	September 24, 2018
Moreira and Soares bring Gringa in to testify to Sônia about Trucco's activities. During a break, a prosecutor secretly informs Trucco's henchmen of the situation and the drug lord orders her to be terminated. Following the attack on Mari and her friend, she is brought back home and kept inside by bodyguards. Vera asks Silas to end his activities so their family is kept alone, but Silas refuses. After much insistence, Mari convinces Silas to take her to visit Alex at the hospital. Silas contemplates using his momentum to launch a political candidacy and visits a political marketing professional. A special unit of Pará's police investigate one of Trucco's boats and find lots of weapons, drugs (including some cocaine recovered from the police's evidence storage) and Parreira (Jeff de Oliveira), a thug that was left behind. He is tortured by the officers, but Moreira and Soares show up and have him taken to the hospital, where he is later killed by one of Trucco's men. Meanwhile, they try to investigate the police's evidence storage, where Mauro and his assistant Oliveira (Carlos Gimenez) work. Soares and Moreira check the hospital's CCTV to search for clues and find out Parreira's killer might be the same criminal seen in one of Silas' stories, so they head to TV Bom Pará to interrogate Silas. Later, Silas and Edinho discuss the situation and Silas mentions that Mauro is "expendable". Edinho arranges a meeting between him and Mauro and asks him to bring Oliveira too. At the meeting point, Edinho shoots Oliveira and explains to Mauro that he'll fake a crime scene to suggest he and Oliveira engaged in a gunfight following an attempt to pressure Mauro. He then asks Mauro whether he wants to be shot in the arm or in the leg to pretend he was wounded by Oliveira.
7	"Fantasmas do Passado" "Ghosts from the Past"	October 1, 2018
As Mauro is taken to the hospital, he gives a false statement to Moreira and Soares. Later, as he leaves the hospital, he is kidnapped. Trucco tortures him for the name of the officer betraying him and severs his hand, sending it to Silas and Edinho later. Gringa's information prove insufficient for her freedom, but she does reveal a connection between Silas and Trucco. Sonia orders Moreira and Soares to monitor Gringa and keep her safe. She hacks into Moreira's mind by telling him to forget the ghosts from his past so he can live his present, causing him to lose control and hold her at gunpoint until Soares intervenes. He takes a smoke to cool his head and has a memory of his father, also a police officer, committing suicide. Soon later, Trucco's men locate and kill Gringa and Soares and Moreira fails to arrive in time to help them, although he does take many thugs out. Silas and Edinho visit Amaral (Gracindo Júnior), a local powerful man, and ask him for sponsorship for Silas' candidacy, but he imposes a condition: that Trucco is eliminated. Renata bribes her way to information on Silas' past and she eventually deduces Silas and Edinho killed their own father. She tells Silas of her findings and he admits the crime.
8	"Acerto de Contas" "Account Settlement"	October 8, 2018
Moreira is questioned by a disappointed Sônia and an assistant following his failure in keeping Gringa safe and is also suspended by Santoss. He seeks help and manage to determine the betrayer. Later, Sônia is unwilling to accept that one of her men would betray her. Moreira captures the guy and demands him to arrange a meeting between him and Trucco. Following Amaral's advice, Sillas airs a story full of criticism on Trucco. As soon as he leaves the TV headquarters, he is captured by Trucco's men and taken to the drug lord, who tortures him. Meanwhile, Moreira locates Trucco and heads to the compound where he is torturing Silas after requesting back-up and revealing the snitch to Sonia. Moreira takes Trucco's men out, but is subdued by the drug lord, who brutally beats him before being shot dead by Silas, who contemplates executing Moreira as well, but leaves as the police arrive. Later at the hospital, Moreira almost succumbs to a heart attack. Sônia refuses to punish the snitch because there's no clear evidence against him and because he could help them capture other drug lords. Edinho delivers some money and flight tickets to Trucco's right hand, but he is subsequently executed by some bikers. With Trucco's gang falling apart, Amaral sees the chance to grow.
