= Saramandaia (1976 TV series) =

- Genre: Telenovela; Comedy; Drama; Romance; Thriller
- Created by: Dias Gomes
- Starring: Juca de Oliveira; Sônia Braga; Castro Gonzaga; Ary Fontoura; Dina Sfat; Wilza Carla; Yoná Magalhães; Antônio Fagundes; Eloísa Mafalda; Elza Gomes; Rafael de Carvalho; Milton Moraes; Sebastião Vasconcelos
- Country of origin: Brazil
- Original language: Portuguese
- No. of episodes: 160

Original release
- Network: TV Globo
- Release: 3 May – 31 December 1976

Related
- Saramandaia (2014)

Saramandaia is a 1976 Brazilian telenovela created by Dias Gomes, produced and aired by TV Globo.

== Plot ==
Set in the sugarcane-growing area of Pernambuco, the story takes place in the fictional municipality of Bole-Bole, which is undergoing a plebiscite to change its name. The movement is headed by two factions: the traditionalists, led by colonel Zico Rosado, who use historical arguments to keep the current name, Bole-Bole; and the changers, led by colonel Tenório Tavares and councillor João Gibão - the latter the brother of mayor Lua Viana - who claim to be ashamed of the name and want to change it to Saramandaia.

But what is striking about the town are the exotic characteristics of some of the characters in the story: Professor Aristóbulo Camargo, who turns into a werewolf on full moon nights; Marcina, who causes fires where she touches and burns those she touches; João Gibão, who hides a beautiful pair of wings in his hump; Encolheu, who predicts the weather with bone pain; Dona Redonda, Encolheu's wife who can't stop eating; Zico Rosado, who puts ants up his nose; among others.

== Production ==
To write the plot, Dias Gomes was inspired by a true story: in the early 1970s, the town of Não-Me-Toque in the state of Rio Grande do Sul changed its name to Campo Real, after a popular movement claimed that the town was the target of jokes from neighboring towns because of its unusual name (years later, a new plebiscite decided to return to the old name). Magical realism was also one of the author's inspirations. This literary style was in vogue at the time and had Gabriel García Márquez as its greatest exponent. Saramandaia was seen as a kind of revenge by Dias Gomes on the censors of the military government. However, even with a text full of disguised criticism, the soap opera didn't manage to pass the censors unscathed, and almost every chapter of the story was cut. To circumvent censorship, the author used a strategy: as the censors were constantly changed and the criteria for cuts varied greatly, he inserted the scenes that had been vetoed in later chapters until they were approved.

== Cast ==
| Actor/actress | Character |
|---|---|
| Juca de Oliveira | João Gibão (João Evangelista Vianna) |
| Yoná Magalhães | Zélia Tavares |
| Sônia Braga | Marcina Moreira |
| Antônio Fagundes | Lua Viana |
| Dina Sfat | Risoleta |
| Ary Fontoura | Professor Aristóbulo Camargo |
| Wilza Carla | Dona Redonda/Dona Bitela (sister) |
| Castro Gonzaga | Zico Rosado |
| Sebastião Vasconcelos | Tenório Tavares |
| Eloísa Mafalda | Maria Aparadeira |
| Pedro Paulo Rangel | Dirceu |
| Milton Moraes | Carlito Prata |
| Rafael de Carvalho | Seu Cazuza Moreira |
| Elza Gomes | Pupú (Eponina Camargo) |
| Lídia Costa | Leocádia Viana |
| Ana Ariel | Dona Santinha Rosado |
| Francisco Dantas | Padre Romeu |
| Marília Barbosa | Bia |
| Wellington Botelho | Seu Encolheu |
| Darcy de Souza | Juju Pimenta (Julieta) |
| Carlos Gregório | Petronílio |
| Natália do Valle | Dora |
| Stênio Garcia | Detetive Geraldo |
| Alzira Andrade | Fernanda |
| Cosme dos Santos | Giuseppe |
| Reynaldo Gonzaga | Epaminondas |
| Maria Pompeu | Ana Bruta |
| Ivan de Albuquerque | Germano |
| Brandão Filho | Maestro Cursino |
| Lajar Muzuris | Maestro Totó |
| Maria Helena Velasco | Emília |
| Jorge Gomes | Nato |
| Teresa Cristina Arnaud | Dulce |
| Wellington Botelho | Encolheu |
| Augusto Olímpio | Hominho |
| Germano Filho | Alcebíades |
| Chica Xavier | Maria das Dores |
| José Augusto Branco | Rochinha |
| Wanda Kosmo | Dona Fifi |
| Carlos Eduardo Dolabella | Homão |

=== Special appearances ===
- Apolo Corrêa - Preso
- Augusto Olímpio - Hominho
- Carlos Eduardo Dolabella - Homão
- César Augusto - Policial de Bole-Bole
- Francisco Cuoco - Tiradentes
- Ivan Setta - Filomeno Netto
- Jaime Leibovitch - Dr. Scholl
- Milton Gonçalves
- Tarcísio Meira - Dom Pedro I
- Ziembinski - Monsenhor Dagoberto
