= Kleiton & Kledir =

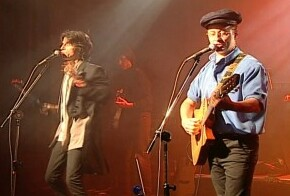
Kleiton & Kledir

Kleiton & Kledir are a duo of Brazilian singers and songwriters, composed of brothers Kleiton Ramil and Kledir Ramil. They are also brothers of singer-songwriter Vitor Ramil.

== Biography ==
The brothers started their musical careers in the 1970s group Almôndegas, with whom they recorded four albums. By the end of the decade the group dissolved and they continued as a duo. Their first album was released in 1980. Their best-known song, "Deu pra Ti" was released in the following album. In 1989 the duo split and each of them released a solo album. Later, they reformed and released Dois in 1997. They still record and perform concerts across Brazil.

In 2008, preparing to record a new unreleased album that should come out in 2009. Meanwhile, continue traveling throughout Brazil with the show's CD/DVD Kleiton & Kledir ao Vivo, where they make a rereading of the career so successful. This album is a release by Orbeat Music and Som Livre, with production by British Paul Ralphes and received the TIM Award for Best Album of the Year in the category of popular song.

The CD/DVD Autorretrato, released in 2009 is a project of new songs. The DVD, in documentary format, meets the new songs and the stories that permeate his creations, telling about the life of the double gaucho. Auto-Retrato the title track, is a conversation between two friends, where each vents and reveals its secrets.

In 2011 launch Par ou Ímpar, her first children's album. This work launched the following year the CD/DVD Par ou Ímpar ao Vivo, in partnership with the Grupo Tholl, also with the participation of Fabiana Karla. The album of the musical show odd or even received the Award of Brazilian music as Best Children's Album, during a ceremony in the City of Rio Theater on June 12, 2013, and the Açorianos Award for Best Children's CD, in Porto Alegre, June 25, 2013.

In 2015 is launched their new album, Com Todas as Letras, which have participation of great writers of Rio Grande do Sul as partners in new compositions. Among the writers are names like Caio Fernando Abreu, Luis Fernando Verissimo, Martha Medeiros, Fabrício Carpi Nejar, Letícia Wierzchowski, Daniel Galera, Paul Scott, Claudia Tajes, Alcy Cheuiche and Lawrence Cazarré. The album is nominated for Açorianos Award in the Album, Composer of MPB.

== Discography ==
- (1980) Kleiton & Kledir
- (1981) Kleiton & Kledir
- (1983) Kleiton & Kledir
- (1984) Kleiton & Kledir
- (1986) Kleiton & Kledir
- (1997) Dois
- (1999) Clássicos do Sul
- (2005) Ao Vivo
- (2009) Autorretrato
- (2011) Par ou Ímpar
- (2012) Par ou Ímpar ao Vivo (with Grupo Tholl)
- (2015) Com Todas as Letras
