= Pocinhos, Paraíba =

Coordinates: 7°04′37″S 36°03′39″W

- Municipality
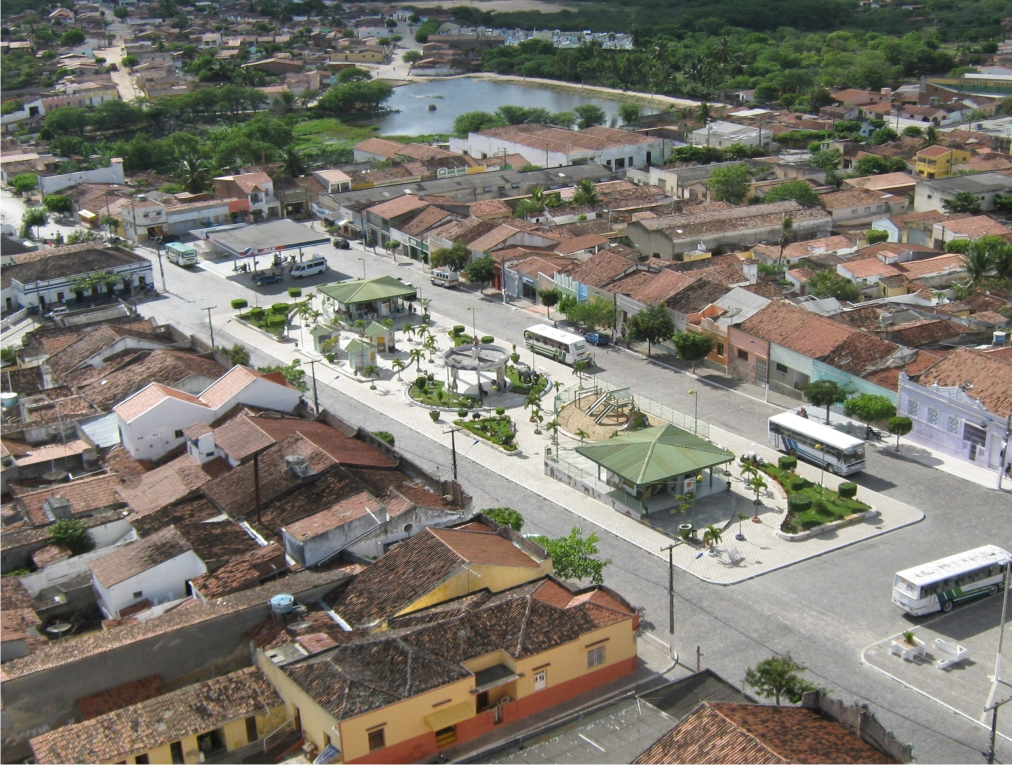

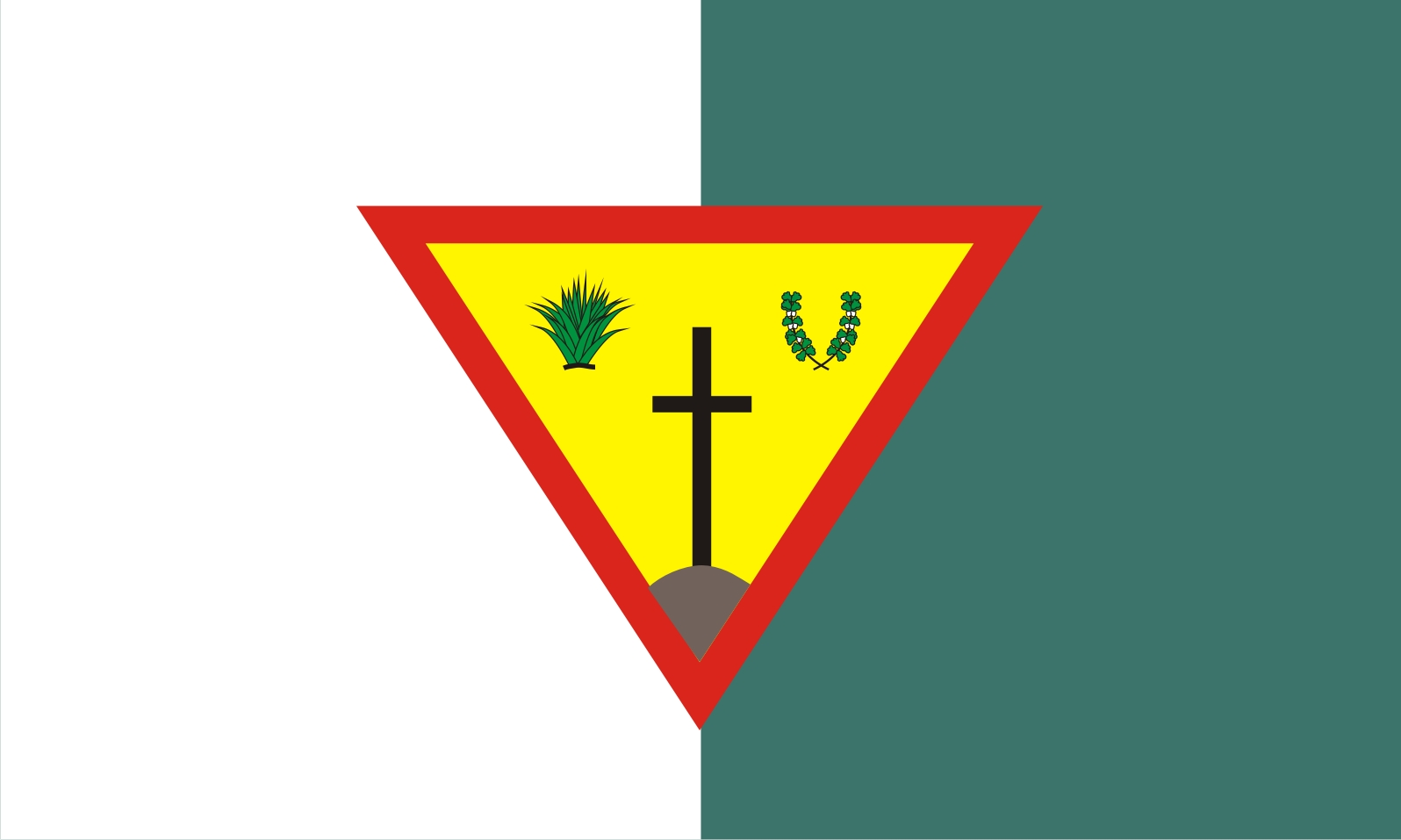
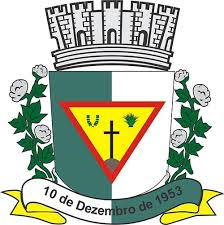
- Flag Coat of arms
- Interactive map of Pocinhos, Paraíba
- Country: Brazil
- Region: Northeast
- State: Paraíba
- Mesoregion: Agreste Paraibano

Population (2020)
  - Total: 18,708
- Time zone: UTC−3 (BRT)

Pocinhos (Central northeastern portuguese pronunciation: [poˈsĩj̃u]) is a municipality in the state of Paraíba in the Northeast Region of Brazil.

== See also ==
- List of municipalities in Paraíba
