= Marcos Rey =

Brazilian writer (1925–1999)

- Born: Edmundo Donato; 17 February 1925; São Paulo, Brazil
- Died: 1 April 1999 (aged 74)
- Occupation: Writer
- Writing career
- Pen name: Marcos Rey

Edmundo Donato (17 February 1925 – 1 April 1999), known by the pseudonym Marcos Rey, was a Brazilian writer.

== Life and career ==
Edmundo Donato was born in 1925 in São Paulo. His father, a printer and bookbinder, worked for Monteiro Lobato's publishing house. His brother was also the writer Mário Donato. At the age of ten, he contracted Hansen's disease (then known as leprosy) and was forcibly interned by the São Paulo Department of Leprosy Prophylaxis in various sanatoriums and hospitals, having escaped on several occasions. In the 1940s, with the discovery of sulfones as a treatment the writer got cured, but the disease left marks on his hands, which he often hid. The fact was only made public after Rey's death; the stigma of the disease embarrassed him.

At the age of 16, he published his first short story, Ninguém entende Wiu-Li, in the newspaper Folha da Manhã. At the age of 20, he moved to Rio de Janeiro, where the risk of being hospitalized was lower. There, he worked as a translator. He returned to São Paulo to work for Rádio Excelsior.

He wrote books for adults, such as Um gato no triângulo (1953), O enterro da cafetina (1967), Memórias de um gigolô (1968) and Malditos paulistas (1980); but he became especially well-known as an author of children's literature; books such as O Mistério do Cinco Estrelas (1981), O Rapto do Garoto de Ouro (1982) and Um Cadáver Ouve Rádio (1983) were published by Editora Ática's Vaga-Lume series.

He also wrote scripts for television, such as the telenovelas O Grande Segredo (1967), A Moreninha (1975), and the series Sítio do Pica-Pau Amarelo (1977). During the 1970s, he was a scriptwriter for pornochanchadas.

He died in 1999 due to complications from a surgery.

== Bibliography ==
- Um Gato no Triângulo, novel, 1953
- O Mistério do Cinco Estrelas, novel
- O Rapto do Garoto de Ouro, novel
- Um Cadáver Ouve Rádio, novel
- Sozinha no Mundo, novel
- Dinheiro do Céu, novel
