= Força de um Desejo =

- Genre: Telenovela
- Created by: Gilberto Braga; Alcides Nogueira
- Starring: Malu Mader; Fábio Assunção; Reginaldo Faria; Paulo Betti; Cláudia Abreu; Marcelo Serrado; Nathália Timberg; Lavínia Vlasak; Selton Mello; Denise Del Vecchio; Louise Cardoso; Daniel Dantas; Isabel Fillardis; Cláudio Corrêa e Castro; Júlia Feldens; André Barros
- Opening theme: "Tema de Ana"
- Composer: Jaques Morelenbaum
- Country of origin: Brazil
- Original language: Portuguese
- No. of episodes: 227

Production
- Running time: 45 minutes

Original release
- Network: Rede Globo
- Release: May 10, 1999 – January 29, 2000

Força de um Desejo (lit. 'Strength of Desire') is a Brazilian telenovela produced by Rede Globo, and was shown in the schedule of 18 hours between May 10, 1999, and January 29, 2000, in 227 chapters. It was written by Gilberto Braga and as collaborators with Alcides Nogueira and Sérgio Marques, Lilian Garcia, Eliane Garcia, Philip Miguez and Mark Silver and directed by Mauro Mendonça Filho, Carlos Araújo, Fabricio Mamberti and João Camargo, with production of the core Marcos Paulo.

Featured Malu Mader, Fábio Assunção, Cláudia Abreu, Marcelo Serrado, Selton Mello, Nathália Timberg, Lavínia Vlasak, Isabel Fillardis, Louise Cardoso, Reginaldo Faria, Denise Del Vecchio and Paulo Betti in leading roles.

== Synopsis ==
The setting is Paraíba Valley, Rio de Janeiro, in the nineteenth century. Higino Ventura (Paulo Betti) is a former peddler who enriched himself with shady dealings. Ventura bought the fazenda of Morro Alto ('Hill Top Plantation') in the town of Sant'Anna to win back the love of Helena (Sonia Braga), a resident of the neighbouring fazenda, Ouro Verde (lit. 'Green Gold', translates to 'Young Gold'). Helena is currently married to the powerful Baron Henrique de Sampaio Sobral (Reginaldo Faria). Ventura is willing to do anything to win Helena back, including buying Ouro Verde and obtaining a noble title. Although Helena disregards Ventura, and is faithful to her husband, she suffers at his hands due to a family secret – Baron Henrique Sobral is aware that his younger son, Abelardo (Selton Mello) is the result of an affair between Helena and Ventura.

The couple's legitimate son, Inácio (Fábio Assunção), despises the cruel treatment that his father reserves to his mother and decides to leave the household. In the capital, he meets Ester Ramos Delamare (Malu Mader), a beautiful courtesan, and owner of the most famous saloon of the Court. They fall in love and live an intense romance, leading Ester to decide to leave her way of life and marry him. However, the unexpected death of Helena Sobral makes Inácio return to the plantation to stay close to his mourning family. Helena's mother, Idalina Menezes Albuquerque Silveira (Nathália Timberg) is against her grandson Inácio's relationship with Ester due to her lower social class although she ignores Ester's job. To put an end to their relationship, Idalina falsifies a letter and convinces Ester that Inácio does not love her anymore.

Baron Sobral is devastated by the death of Helena and is tormented by remorse and guilt over mistreating his wife. He decides to start a new life and travels throughout the court. After meeting Ester at her famous saloon in Rio de Janeiro, he falls in love with her without knowing the man who left her heartbroken is his son, Inácio. The Baron convinces Ester that it is not worth throwing her life away over a heartbreak. Willing to offer Ester a new life, Baron Sobral asks her to marry him. After the wedding, Sobral and Ester return to Ouro Verde. Upon their arrival, Ester comes face to face with Inácio; victims of Idalina's schemes, the former lovers are forced to live in the same house, hiding their past to everyone.

Ester and Inácio try to avoid each other but eventually end up clarifying the misunderstanding that separated them. They decide to tell Sobral the truth but end up not doing it upon discovery that the Baron is seriously ill. Dissatisfied with the situation and knowing that Ouro Verde is facing financial difficulties, Inácio marries Alice Ventura (Lavinia Vlasak), the daughter of Higino Ventura and his wife, Barbara (Denise Del Vecchio), whose only goal is that of becoming a baroness.

At Ouro Verde, Ester becomes friends with Zulmira (Ana Carbatti), her house slave at the fazenda who, however, she treats with kindness and as if she were a maid instead. Ester then discovers that Zulmira's family has been divided by slavers and decides to reunite Zulmira with her loved ones with help from her best friend Guiomar Pereira da Silva (Louise Cardoso), a former courtesan who moved to Sant'Anna to live closer to Ester, and local journalist Bartolomeu Xavier (Daniel Dantas).

Ventura continues with his plans to humiliate his rival, Henrique Sobral, and becomes obsessed with newcomer Olivia (Claudia Abreu). Snubbed by the girl, Ventura inquires about her, and he discovers that she is an enslaved woman on the run and that she is being sought by the police. As Olivia befriends Ester, more of her story is revealed – Olivia was born to a wealthy landowner and a light-skinned African enslaved woman. Her father recognized her as his daughter, and despite his family did not accept such a situation, he named her Ana Tambellini, educated her and wrote her a carta de libertad, a letter of manumission to acknowledge she was born free. Unfortunately, Olivia's father did not register the letter officially. When he died, his racist and envious eldest daughter tore the letter of manumission and wanted to make Ana a slave. For this reason, the girl ran away and changed her name to Olivia. Upon learning this from Olivia's sister, Ventura decides to deliver her to the police only to buy her back from her family to abuse Olivia as a sex slave. Olivia goes through Hell, unable to escape the clutches of her cruel owner despite the attempts of her boyfriend, the young doctor Mariano Xavier (Marcelo Serrado), and those of their friends Inácio and Ester, to release her from slavery.

The town of Sant'Anna is struck by tragedy: Baron Henrique Sobral is murdered during the engagement party of Abelardo and Juliana Xavier (Julia Feldens). This is the same night Inácio and Ester flee to live together after they discovered the farce of Sobral's disease — fearful of losing his wife, the Baron made the disease up as a way to prevent Ester from leaving him. Local police mobilise to arrest Inácio, the prime suspect in the death of Baron Sobral. Thus begins a race against time to spare Inácio pay for a crime he did not commit. His friends and allies get to work to uncover the identity of the real killer.

== Cast ==
Actor	Character
Malu Mader	Ester Ramos Delamare
Fábio Assunção	Inácio Silveira Sobral
Cláudia Abreu	Olívia / Ana Tambellini
Reginaldo Faria	Barão Henrique Sobral
Paulo Betti	Higino Ventura
Nathália Timberg	Idalina Menezes de Albuquerque Silveira
Lavínia Vlasak	Alice Ventura
Selton Mello	Abelardo Silveira Sobral
Denise Del Vecchio	Bárbara Ventura
Marcelo Serrado	Mariano Xavier
Isabel Fillardis	Luzia
Louise Cardoso	Guiomar Pereira da Silva
Cláudio Corrêa e Castro	Leopoldo Silveira
Daniel Dantas	Bartolomeu Xavier
Júlia Feldens	Juliana Xavier
André Barros	Trajano Cantuária
José Lewgoy	Felício Cantuária
Chico Diaz	Clemente
Chica Xavier	Rosália
Antônio Grassi	Vitório
Dira Paes	Palmira
Sérgio Menezes	Jesus
Ana Carbatti	Zulmira
Nelson Dantas	Dr. Xavier
Rosita Tomaz Lopes	Fabíola Xavier
Alexandre Moreno	Cristóvão
Luís Magnelli	Gaspar

=== Guests ===
Cast in alphabetical order

Actor	Character
Abrahão Farc	Padre Olinto
André Valli	Lourival
Ângelo Paes Leme	Rodrigo, Alice's suitor
Antônio Fragoso	Isidoro
Bruno Garcia	Lauro, Olivia's pretend husband
Carlos Alberto	Judge
Carlos Eduardo Dolabella	Comendador Queiroz
Carlos Gregório	Barcelos
Carlos Machado	Estácio
Cláudio Mamberti	Domingos de Castro Magalhães
Clemente Viscaíno	Inspector Bustamante
Cosme dos Santos	Quirino
David Herman	Stanley
Dary Reis	Albano
Delma Silva	Diva
Elaine Mickely	Hermínia Montez, a famous courtesan
Eliana Guttman	Laura, birth mother of Alice Ventura
Élida Muniz	Marta
Fábio Sabag	Breno Rangel
Flávio Galvão	Nereu
Giovanna Antonelli	Violeta, a courtesan
Glória Portella	Florinda, a courtesan
Helder Agostini	Manoel, Olivia's pretend son
Helena Fernandes	Srtª. Clara Toledo de Mendonça
Henrique César	Marquês de Boaventura
Henrique Taxman	Dr. Humberto, a young doctor friend of Mariano
Jayme Periard	Padre Osvaldo
José Augusto Branco	Epaminondas, owner of a bakery in court
José de Abreu	Pereira
Júlio Braga	sexton
Kadu Karneiro	Pedro
Lineu Dias	Luciano, auctioneer of slaves
Lucas Bonel	Otavinho Ventura Sobral
Luciana Azevedo	Ivete
Luiz Guilherme	Carrazedo
Marcelo Várzea	Ubaldo
Márcia Del Anillo	Noêmia, a courtesan
Marco Ricca	Conde Pedro Afonso de Andrade Aguiar
Mariana Ximenes	Ângela
Mário Lago	Dr. Teodoro, a quack doctor addicted to gambling
Murilo Rosa	Eugênio, friend of Inácio in the Court
Neuza Amaral	Anita, director of the hospital where Alice was born
Nill Marcondes	Zelito, a slave
Otávio Augusto	Dr. Eurico Navarro
Otávio Müller	Ferdinando, a safecracker a Guiomar's friend
Othon Bastos	promoter
Paulo Reis	Shepherd, a slave
Raniere Gonzalez	Reinaldo
Ronnie Marruda	Raimundo
Samuel Mello	Dário
Sônia Braga	Baronesa Helena Sobral
Sônia Siqueira	Hortência
Stepan Nercessian	Ernani Corrêa, a forger
Thereza Piffer	Dora Tambellini, a former mistress and Olívia's sister
Victor Fasano	Nicolau Prado
Vinícius Marques	Valdir
Viviane Victorette	Clarissa, a courtesan
Xando Graça	auctioneer of slaves
Yaçanã Martins	Socorro

== Production ==
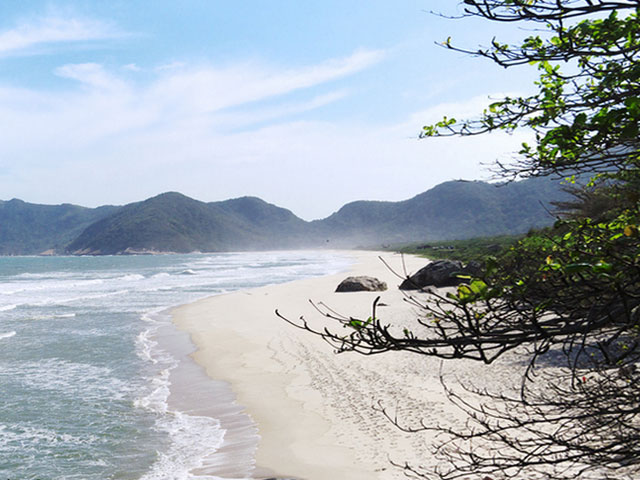
Grumari Beach, where some scenes of the opening credits were filmed.

The original plot was written by Alcides Nogueira in 1988, with the title of Amor perfeito, and was almost broadcast on Rede Globo as a daytime soap opera. The project ended up being cancelled, and only ten years later, Globo greenlit the project with Gilberto Braga developing it together with Nogueira. Inspired by three novels by Alfredo d'Escragnolle Taunay – A Retirada da Laguna, Inocência and A Mocidade de Trajano– and set in the second half of the 19th century, the plot also had as a backdrop important events in the history of Brazil, such as the Paraguayan War and the abolitionist movement.

The opera sequence that was broadcast in the first episode – the third act of The Marriage of Figaro, by Mozart – was performed in the Municipal Theater of Niterói, with the participation of 100 extras. Força de um desejo also had scenes shot on Grumari beach, in Alto da Boa Vista and in Forte São João, in Urca, all tourist spots in Rio de Janeiro. A two-week workshop was held with the actors of the telenovela, including four courses taught by university professors, which had as their themes the Empire of Brazil, the daily life of the coffee and sugar fazendas, and Romanticism. Some actors took part in classes in fencing, horseback riding, calligraphy and body language and diction to adapt to the language and customs of the time.

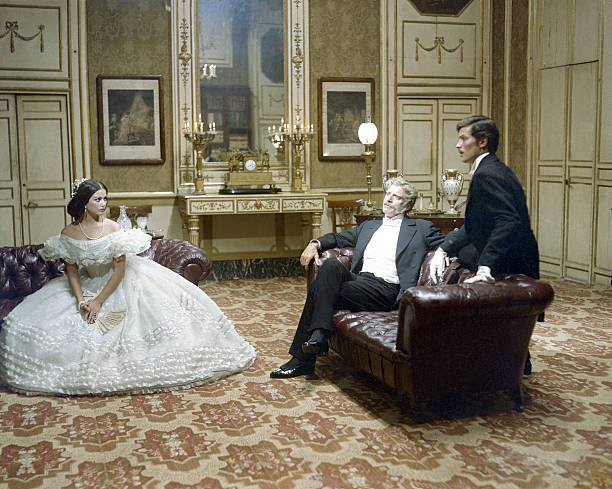
Claudia Cardinale, Burt Lancaster, and Alain Delon in a scene from the Italian classic The Leopard ("Il Gattopardo", 1963), one of the works that inspired the characterization of the noble characters in Força de um Deseo.

The physical appearance and clothing of the characters were entrusted to Marlene Moura. It included thick sideburns and moustaches as well as starched shirts and collars, in the case of the men, and appliques at the waist, heavy clothing, and pastel-toned makeup for the women. Some actors and actresses increased the length of their hair with extensions, such as Dira Paes, Daniel Dantas, Chico Díaz and Malu Mader, who also used false eyelashes. José de Abreu had a partially shaved head to facilitate the application of a wig and had to wear a fatsuit.

The noble characters' features were inspired by those of films such as Luchino Visconti's The Leopard, a 1963 classic of Italian cinema based on the novel of the same name by Giuseppe Tomasi di Lampedusa, and Stanley Kubrick's Barry Lyndon (1975), which served as a model for the theme of Romanticism in the telenovela. Greta Garbo's role as Marguerite Gauthier in the 1936 film Camille by George Cukor (based on The Lady of the Camellias, a 1848 novel by Alexandre Dumas fils) and the atmosphere of Shane, a 1953 film directed by George Stevens, served as a reference for set designer Denise Carvalho, whose team faithfully reconstructed the interiors of the homes and workplaces.

About half a million reais were spent on 2,500 pieces of clothing. The wedding dress worn by Lavinia Vlasak in the episode of her character Alice's wedding, designed by costume designer Otacílio Coutinho, is inspired by the costume that Claudia Cardinale used in The Leopard. With a tulle covered in beads and glitter and pleats that enhance the neckline, if it were sold in stores, this dress would not leave less than 350,000 reais, according to the costume designer; still according to him, what makes the dresses more expensive are the embroidery, all done by hand.

The costumes, under the responsibility of Beth Filipecki, consumed 3,000 meters of different fabrics, such as linen, pure silk taffeta, and English adamascados and natural fibers, used for the costumes of the enslaved characters. Ester's wardrobe was inspired by the dresses of Empress Elisabeth of Austria, nicknamed Sissi.

Several costumes from the novel were later reused for the miniseries Os Maias, in 2001.
