= Insensato Coração =

- Genre: Telenovela
- Created by: Gilberto Braga; Ricardo Linhares
- Directed by: Dennis Carvalho
- Starring: Antônio Fagundes; Glória Pires; Eriberto Leão; Paolla Oliveira; Lázaro Ramos; Camila Pitanga; Gabriel Braga Nunes; Deborah Evelyn; Herson Capri; Deborah Secco; Juliano Cazarré; Ana Lúcia Torre; Natália do Vale; Nathalia Timberg; Tarcísio Meira
- Opening theme: "Coração em Desalinho" by Maria Rita "Amor clandestino" by Maná (international version)
- Country of origin: Brazil
- Original language: Portuguese
- No. of episodes: 185 (150 International Version)

Production
- Editors: Célio Fonseca; Rosemeire de Barros Oliveira; Paulo Jorge Correia
- Camera setup: Multi-camera
- Running time: 50 minutes

Original release
- Network: TV Globo
- Release: 17 January – 19 August 2011

Insensato Coração (Irrational Heart) is a Brazilian telenovela produced and broadcast by TV Globo that first premiered 17 January 2011, replacing Passione and ended on 19 August 2011, followed by Fina Estampa. It is created and written by Gilberto Braga and Ricardo Linhares in collaboration with Ângela Carneiro, Fernando Rebello, Izabel de Oliveira, João Ximenes Braga, Maria Helena Nascimento and Nelson Nadotti. Directed by Dennis Carvalho and Vinícius Coimbra together with Cristiano Marques, Flávia Lacerda, Maria de Médicis and Luísa Lima.

Starring Antonio Fagundes, Glória Pires, Eriberto Leão, Paolla Oliveira, Lázaro Ramos, Camila Pitanga, Gabriel Braga Nunes, Deborah Evelyn, Herson Capri, Deborah Secco, Juliano Cazarré, Ana Lúcia Torre, Natália do Vale, Nathalia Timberg and Tarcísio Meira.

== Plot ==
Irrational Heart revolves around unreasonable attitudes and the consequences generated that threaten to change the course of many lives. This action filled, thrilling telenovela follows the fierce relationship of brothers Pedro and Leo Brandão.

Good-natured Pedro is a pilot who is engaged to be married but falls in love with Marina Drummond. They meet during the high jacking of a plane and together take control of the flight, allowing for a safe landing. In appreciation, Marina impulsively kisses Pedro, and they are instantly connected. But they are unaware that Marina is actually an old college friend of Pedro's fiancée, Luciana. When they find this out and decide to go separate ways an unpredictable series of events is unleashed.

Pedro faces a period of recovery after being tried and arrested for a crime that will not go unpunished and Marina must put her feelings on hold even after he is freed. Unlike his brother Pedro, Leo is unscrupulous and greedy. His perpetual envy for his brother causes him to make irrational choices that involve stealing, cheating, and kidnapping. To top it off, their mother, Wanda is extremely overprotective of Leo and makes foolish choices in her obsession for her son. But Pedro has underestimated just how clever and cunning his sibling can truly be.

Not only does the relentless Leo manage to edge aside his brother in the eyes of Marina, but he also succeeds in deceiving Norma, a naïve nurse who develops a genuine affection for him. He only keeps up the charade of their romance in a desperate bid to steal money from Norma's boss. But after serving a jail sentence for a crime she didn't commit, Norma will be driven by a strong desire for vengeance against Leo.

Before long, irrational actions transform two once-happy brothers into bitter rivals with Pedro demanding justice for Leo's misconduct.

== Cast ==
- Glória Pires as Norma Pimentel Amaral
- Eriberto Leão as Pedro Alencar Brandão
- Paolla Oliveira as Marina Drummond Brandão
- Gabriel Braga Nunes as Leonardo Alencar Brandão (Léo / Armando / Fred / Wilson)
- Deborah Secco as Natalie Lamour (Natalie Batista Cortez)
- Herson Capri as Horácio Cortez
- Antônio Fagundes as Raul Brandão
- Camila Pitanga as Carolina Miranda (Carol)
- Lázaro Ramos as André Gurgel
- Natália do Vale as Wanda Brandão
- Deborah Evelyn as Eunice Alencar Machado
- Marcelo Valle as Júlio Machado
- Juliano Cazarré as Ismael Cunha
- Cristina Galvão as Jandira Mesquita
- Ana Lúcia Torre as Anita Brandão (Tia Neném)
- Nathalia Timberg as Vitória Drummond
- Jonatas Faro as Rafael Cortez (Rafa)
- Bruna Linzmeyer as Leila Machado
- Giovanna Lancellotti as Cecília Machado
- Thiago Martins as Vinicius Rocha Amaral
- Maria Clara Gueiros as Abigail Castellani (Bibi)
- Ricardo Tozzi as Douglas Batista
- Isabela Garcia as Daisy Damasceno
- Petrônio Gontijo as Roberto Fischer (Beto)
- Cássio Gabus Mendes as Kléber Damasceno
- Louise Cardoso as Sueli Brito Aboim
- Paloma Bernardi as Alice Miranda
- Tainá Müller as Paula Cortez
- Rodrigo Andrade as Eduardo Aboim
- Marcos Damigo as Hugo Abrantes
- Leonardo Miggiorin as Roni Fragonard
- Wendell Bendelack as Francisco Madureira (Xicão)
- Rosi Campos as Haidê Batista
- Bete Mendes as Zuleica Alencar
- José de Abreu as Milton Castelani
- Roberta Rodrigues as Fabíola dos Santos
- Guilherme Piva as Gabino Damasceno
- Ricardo Pereira as Henrique Taborda
- Luigi Baricelli as Oscar Amaral
- Helena Fernandes as Gilda Fischer Amaral
- Fernanda Paes Leme as Irene Brandão
- José Augusto Branco as Floriano Brandão
- Norma Blum as Olga Brandão
- Eduardo Galvão as Wagner Peixoto
- Leonardo Carvalho as Willian Sampaio
- Edson Fieschi as Nelson Mesquita
- André Barros as Zeca Peçanha
- Thiago de Los Reyes as Joaquim Garrido Marcondes de Almeida (Quim)
- Vítor Novello as Sérgio Fischer Amaral (Serginho)
- Polliana Aleixo as Olívia Damasceno
- Antônio Fragoso as Isidoro Brito
- Pedro Garcia Netto as Fernando Brandão (Nando)
- Carla Lamarca as Célia
- Andréa Dantas as Lídia
- Daniel Marques as José Paulo Assis (Zé Paulo)
- Cristiano Ximenes as Lucas Pereira Bastos
- Rita Porto as Zulmira
- Rogério Freitas as Dorival
- Carol Fazú as Ivone
- Márcio Alvarez as Marcos Camargo
- Guilherme Leme as Aquiles Trajano
- Cláudio Tovar as Borges
- Naruna Costa as Renata
- Nelson Diniz as Afrânio
- Marcos Otávio as Ivan
- Prazeres Barbosa as Amélia
- Beth Zalcman as Aparecida Garcia (Cida)
- Kiko Pissolato as Manolo
- Tarcísio Meira as Teodoro Amaral
- José Wilker as Umberto Brandão
- Fernanda Machado as Luciana Alencar
- Hugo Carvana as Olegário Silveira
- Tuca Andrada as Jonas Brito
- Nívea Maria as Carmem Santana
- Milton Gonçalves as Gregório Gurgel
- Cristiana Oliveira as Araci Laranjeira
- Lavínia Vlasak as Úrsula
- Ângela Vieira as Gisela Oliveira
- Vera Fischer as Catarina Diniz
- Maria Padilha as Marlene Valdez
- Tamara Taxman as Florinda

=== Cameo ===
- Adriano Garib as Fonseca
- Aisha Jambo as Patrícia
- Alejandro Claveaux as Paulo
- Alexandra Martins as Matilde Lenísio
- Amanda Richter as Vera
- Amilton Monteiro as Dr. Moreira
- Ana Beatriz Nogueira as Clarice Cortez
- Ana Carbatti as Marlene Gurjel de Souza
- André Guerreiro as Figueiredo
- Anja Bittencourt as Neusa
- Antônio Karnewale as Clóvis
- Arieta Corrêa as Darcy
- Beta Perez as Ana
- Bianca Byington as Dulce Petroni
- Bia Seidl as Helena
- Breno de Felippo as Bira
- Bruno Gradim as Dimas
- Bruno Torres as Valdir
- Cacau Hygino as Joel
- Cadu Fávero as Márcio
- Camilo Bevilacqua as Ernani
- Carlo Briani as Deputy Rubens Guimarães
- Carlos Fonte Boa as Antenor
- Carlos Vieira as Walter
- Carol Portes as Fernanda
- Carolina Holanda as Ísis
- Charles Möeller as Himself
- Cláudia Provedel as Jane
- Cláudio Botelho as Himself
- Cleiton Morais as Diogão
- Cristina Flores as Cláudia Malta
- Daniella Sarahyba as Herself
- Daniela Dinn as Thelma
- Daniel Del Sarto as Vicente
- Daniel Dalcin as Afonso
- Daniel Faleiros as Décio
- Daniel Jorge as Child Léo
- Daniel Rolim as Himself
- Dênis Derkian as Gomes
- Diego Cristo as Felipe Augusto Campos Melo
- Douglas Simon as Gustavo
- Dudu Azevedo as Neymar
- Ed Oliveira as Rubens
- Edgard Amorim as Jorge
- Ellen Rocche as Ingrid Matos
- Elisa Lucinda as Vilma Miranda
- Felipe Massa as Himself
- Fernando Wellington as Dr. Siqueira
- Gero Pestalozzi as Fabiano Delamare
- Gilberto Marmorosch as Mendonça
- Gláucia Rodrigues as Claudete
- Giulio Lopes as Delegado Matos
- Herbert Richers Jr. as Ramirez (Aquiles's customer)
- Ildi Silva as Daniela
- Isaac Bernat as Emerson
- Isabel Fillardis as Marise
- Ivan Mendes as Renato
- Italo Sasso as Ney
- Jaqueline Farias as Herself
- Jéssika Alves as Vânia
- Johny Luz as Ciro
- Jonathan Azevedo as Lino
- José D'Artagnan Júnior as Reinaldo
- Juliana Terra as Rita Fonseca
- Júlio Levy as Gonzalez
- Karina Dohme as Jéssica
- Larissa Queiroz as Selma "Selminha" Macedo
- Leandra Leal as Adriana
- Luísa Friesi as Marisa
- Luiz Henrique Nogueira as Nicolas
- Leandro Lima as Patrick de Jesus
- Lidi Lisboa as Cátia
- Linn Jardim as Diana Chaves
- Luca de Castro as Tonico / Marcondes
- Luciano Quirino as Lutero
- Luiz Henrique Nogueira as Nicolas
- Manuela do Monte as Cíntia
- Marcelo Batista as Santos
- Marcelo Capobiango as Adelmo
- Marcelo Laham as Marcelo
- Marcelo Várzea as Celso Tavares / Juca
- Márcia do Valle as Sônia
- Márcio Mariante as Noronha
- Marcos Acher as Chagas
- Marcos Otávio as Ivan
- Maria Carolina Ribeiro as Vivian
- Míriam Mehler as Lurdes
- Maria Melillo as Herself
- Marília Pêra as Herself
- Mariana Dubois as Denise
- Mário César Camargo as Getúlio Miranda
- Mário Hermeto as Gino
- Marise Gonçalves as Adelaide
- Marta Paret as Vanessa
- Maurício Silveira as Samuel
- Melissa Vettore as Bia Faissal
- Miguel Roncato as Gilvan dos Santos
- Monalisa Gomes as Suzana
- Murilo Grossi as Delegado Freitas
- Nathália Rodrigues as Andressa Pereira
- Nelson Diniz as Afrânio
- Ney Matogrosso as Himself
- Omar Docena as Cadú
- Otto Jr. as Deputy Xavier
- Pablo Aguilar as Rogério
- Paula Possani as Mônica
- Paulo Giardini as Martins
- Paulo Reis as Newton
- Paulo Vespúcio as Andrade
- Rafael Sieg as Cícero Torres
- Raica Oliveira as Herself
- Renato Lobo as Dr. Sabino
- Ricardo Pavão as Deputy Marcos Rossi
- Ricardo Rathsam as Álvaro
- Roberta Foster as Tânia
- Roberto França as Robson
- Rodolfo Mesquita as Eduardo
- Rodrigo Rangel as Saldanha
- Roger Galera Flores as Himself
- Rubens Camelo as Inspector Tavares
- Sarah Maciel as Filha de Gisela
- Samir Murad as Djalma
- Sérgio Monte as Clécio
- Sérgio Rufino as Apolônio
- Susanna Kruger as Diva
- Susana Ribeiro as Dalva
- Tania Bôscoli as Zoraide
- Thais Botelho as Nina
- Thiago Rodrigues as Daniel
- Val Perré as Ivo
- Vânia Love as Lívia Live
- Vinícius Manne as Hélio
- Viviana Rocha as Cris
- Viviane Victorette as Jana
- Wesley Schunk as Himself
- Xando Graça as Valdemir Prudente
- Xuxa Lopes as Dolores
- Zemanuel Piñero as Alejandro
- Zé Victor Castiel as Werner Lindemberg
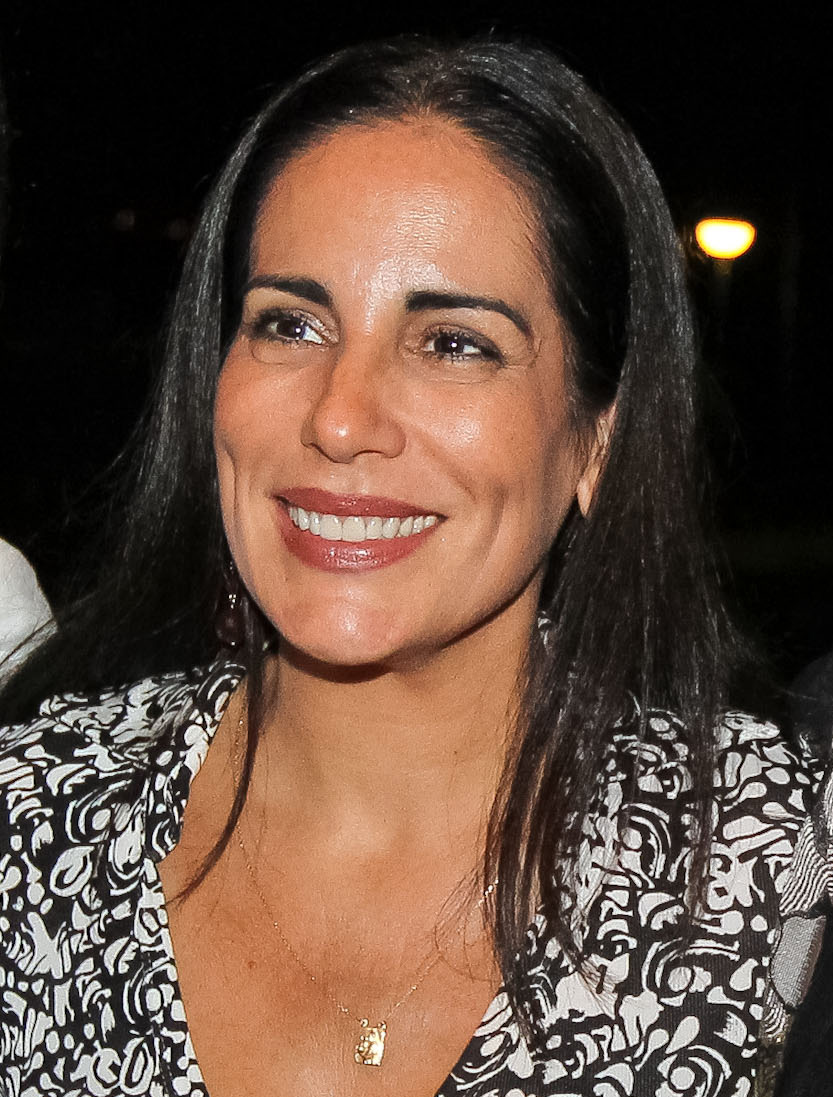
Glória Pires
Norma

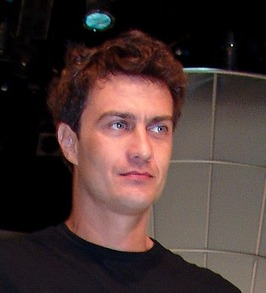
Gabriel Braga Nunes
Léo

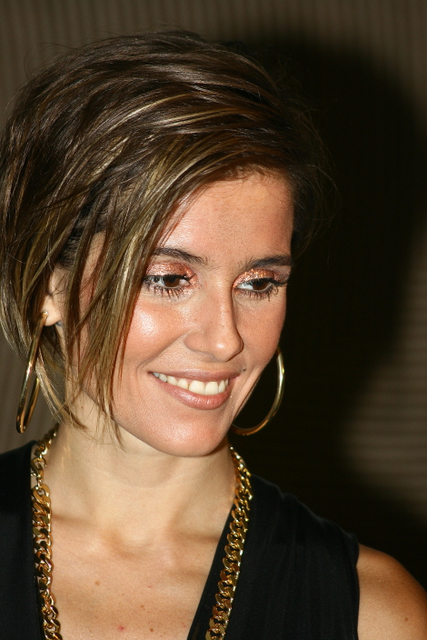
Deborah Secco
Natalie

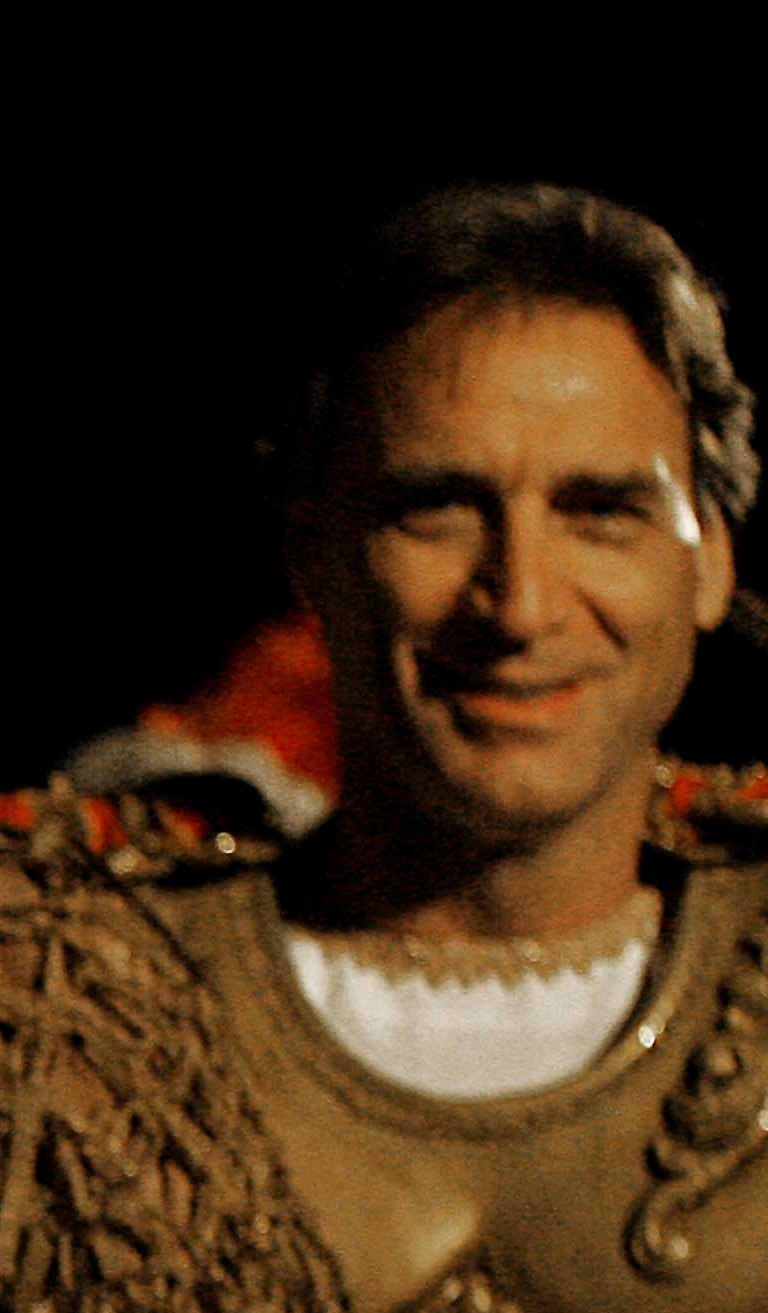
Herson Capri
Horácio Cortez

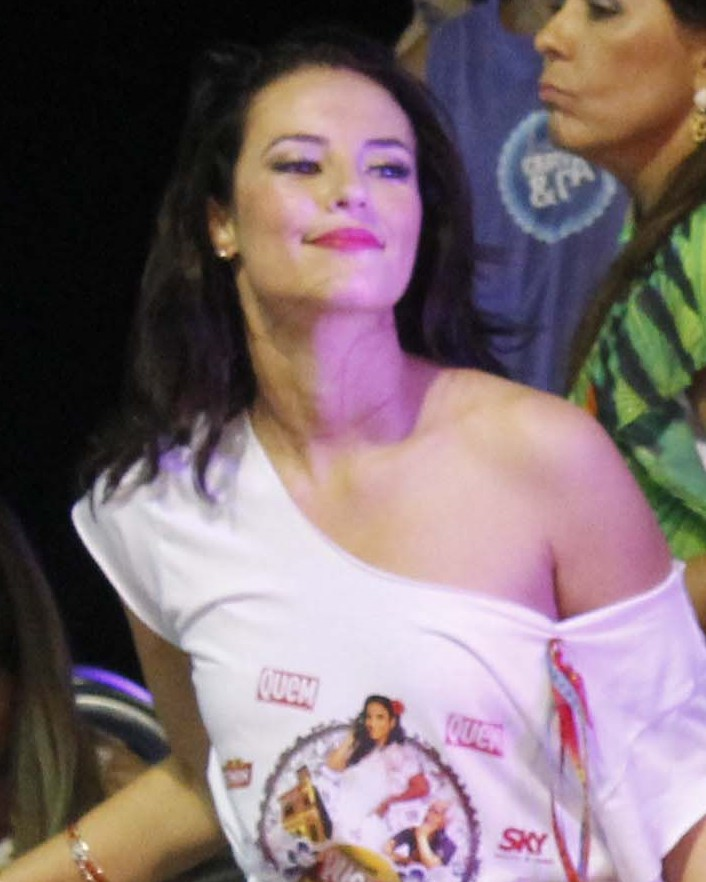
Paolla Oliveira
Marina

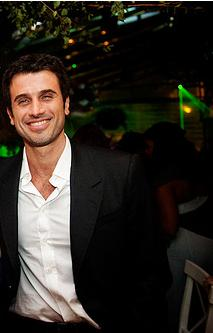
Eriberto Leão
Pedro

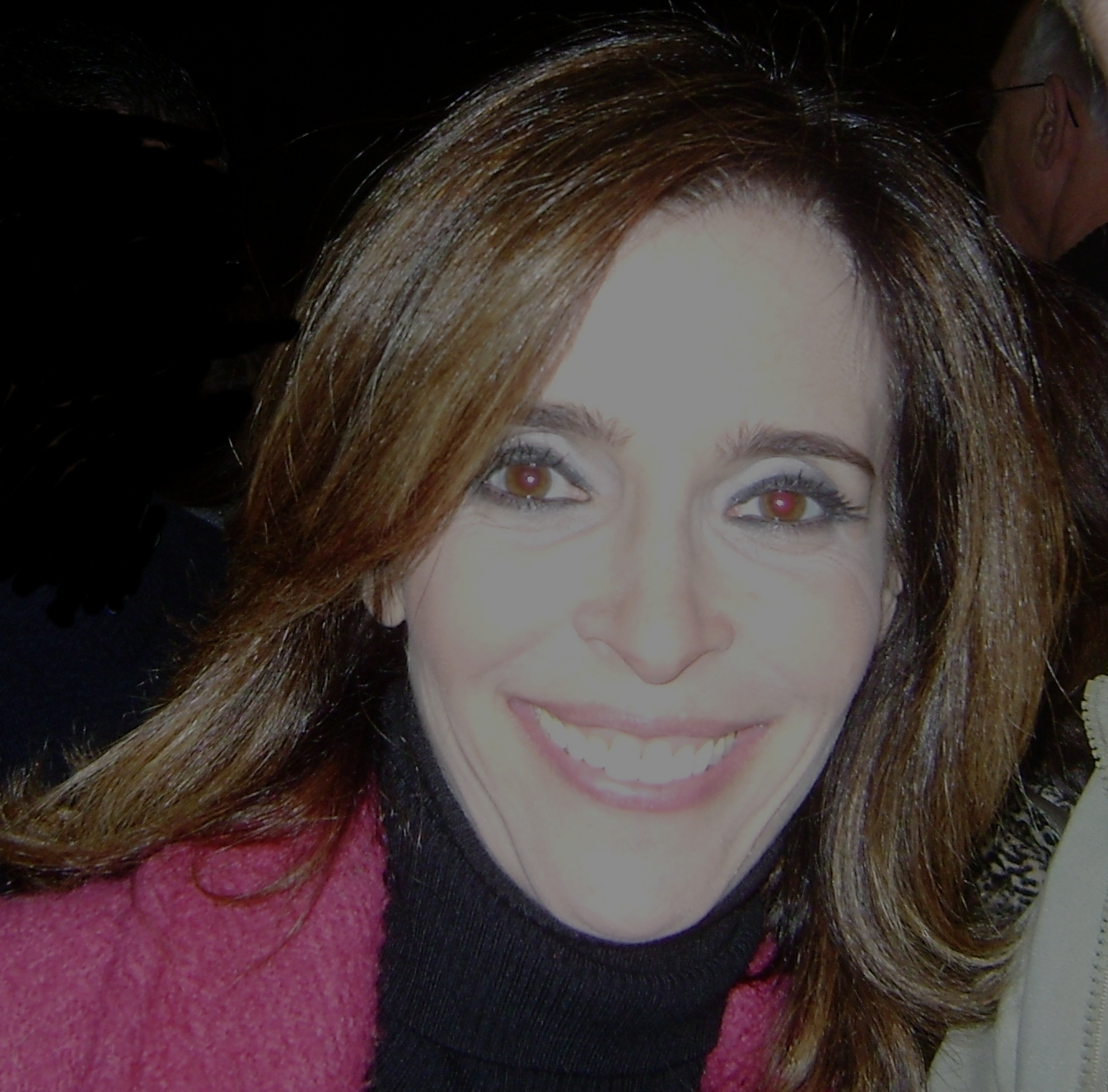
Deborah Evelyn
Eunice

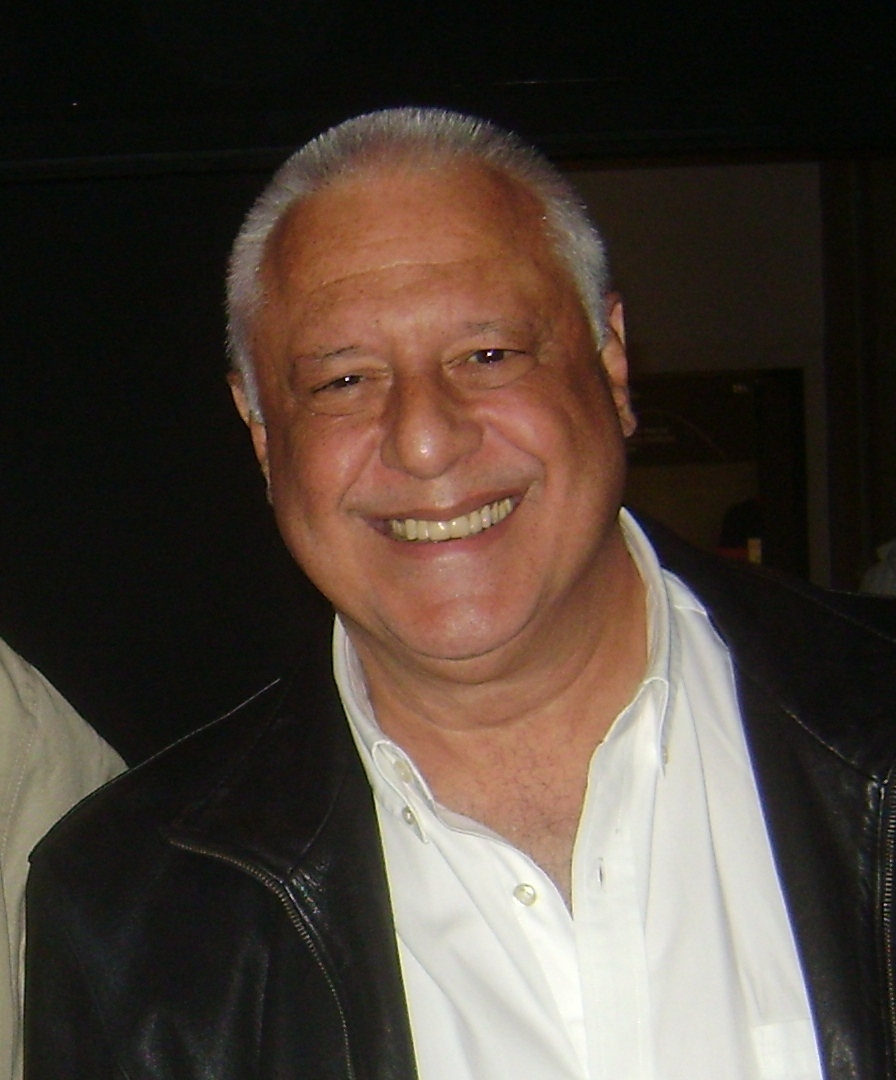
Antônio Fagundes
Raul

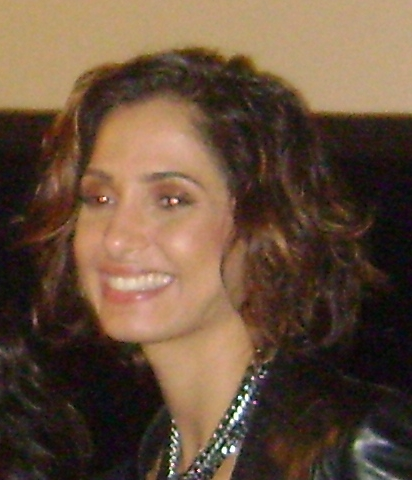
Camila Pitanga
Carol

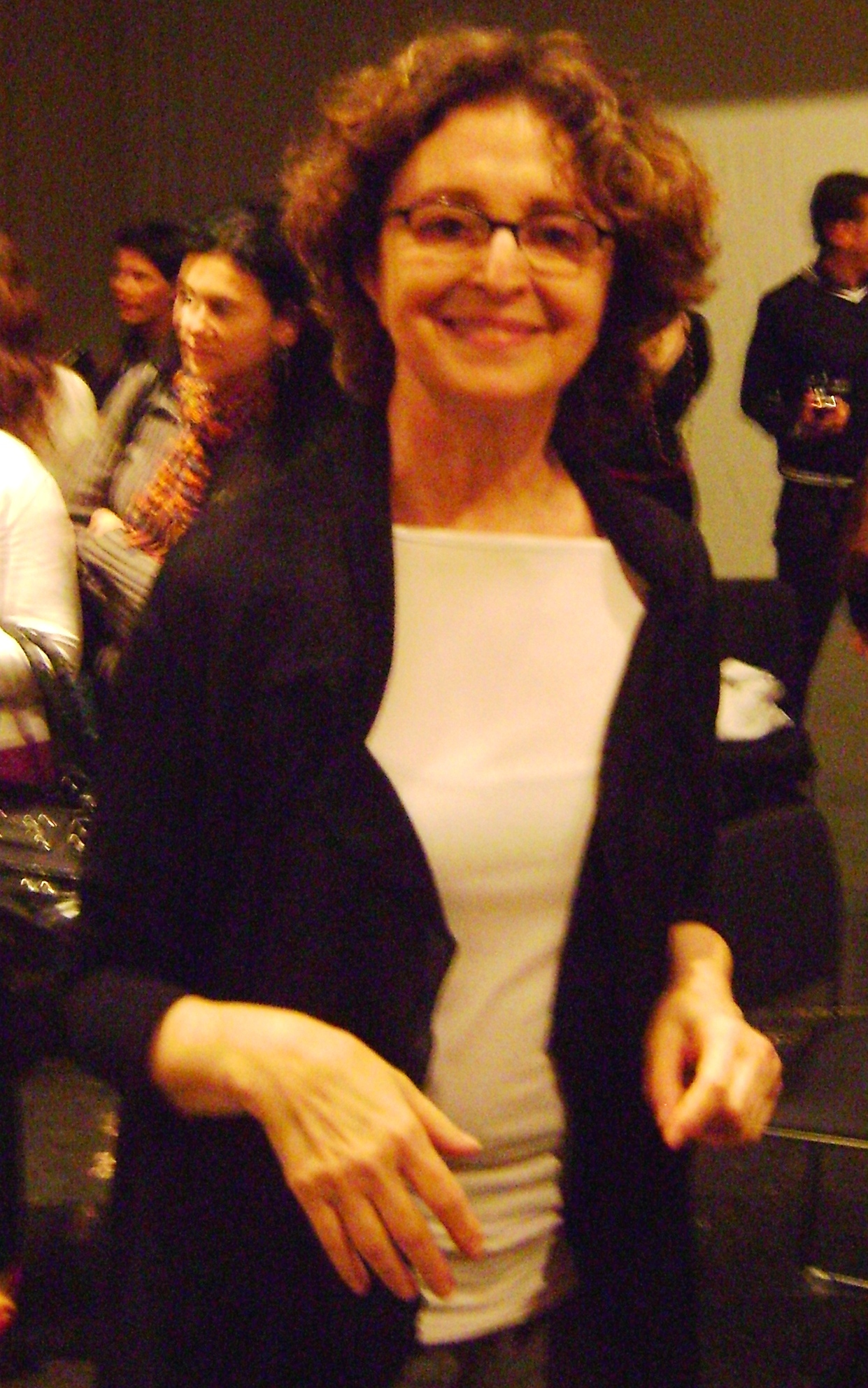
Ana Lúcia Torre
Tia Neném

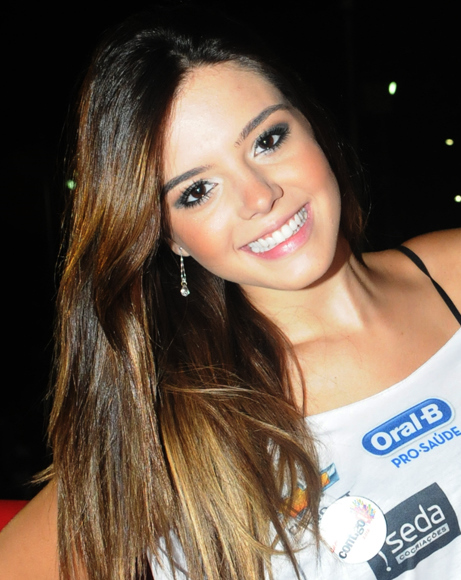
Giovanna Lancellotti
Cecília

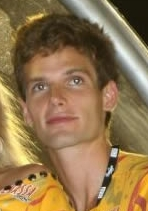
Jonatas Faro
Rafa

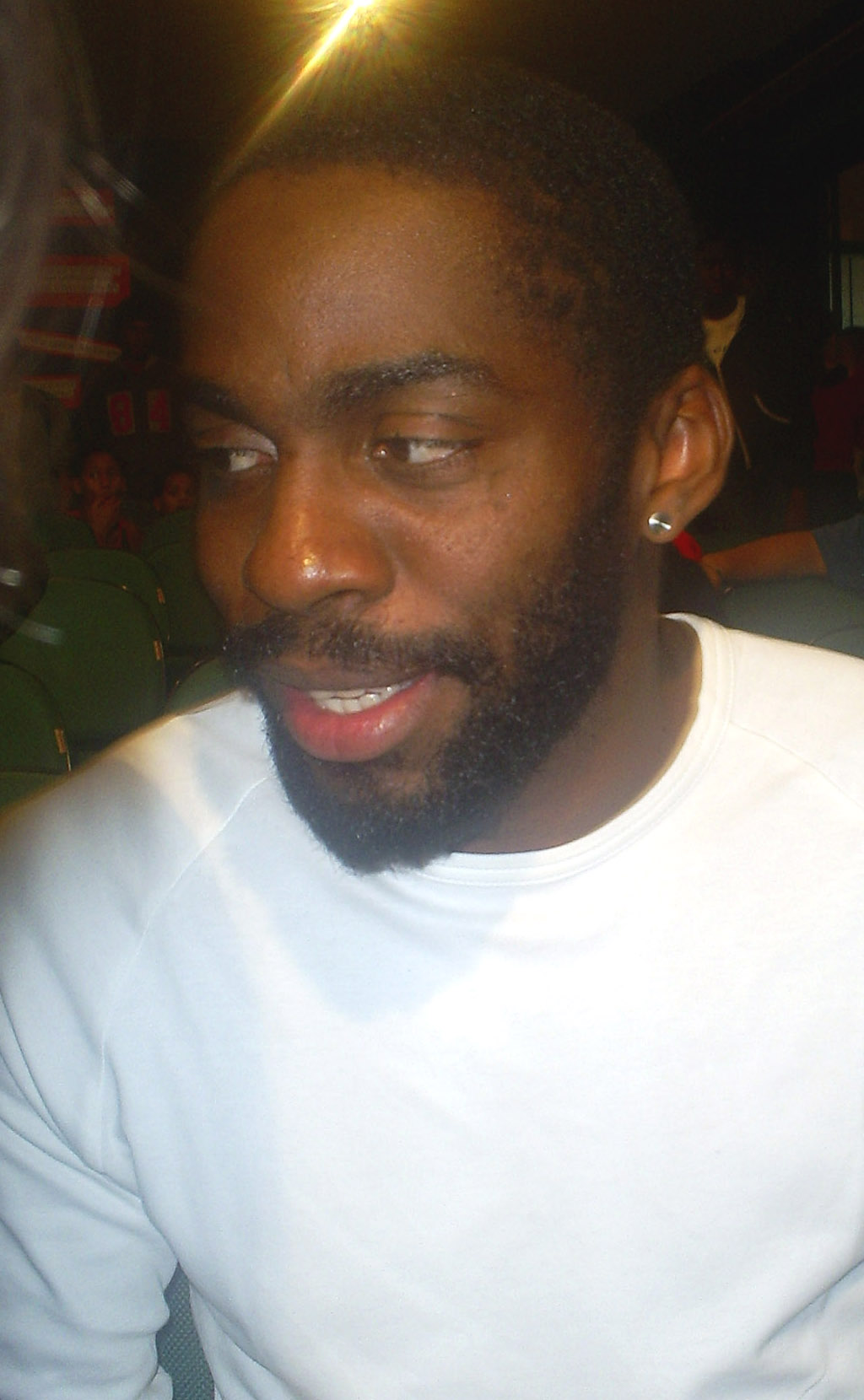
Lázaro Ramos
André

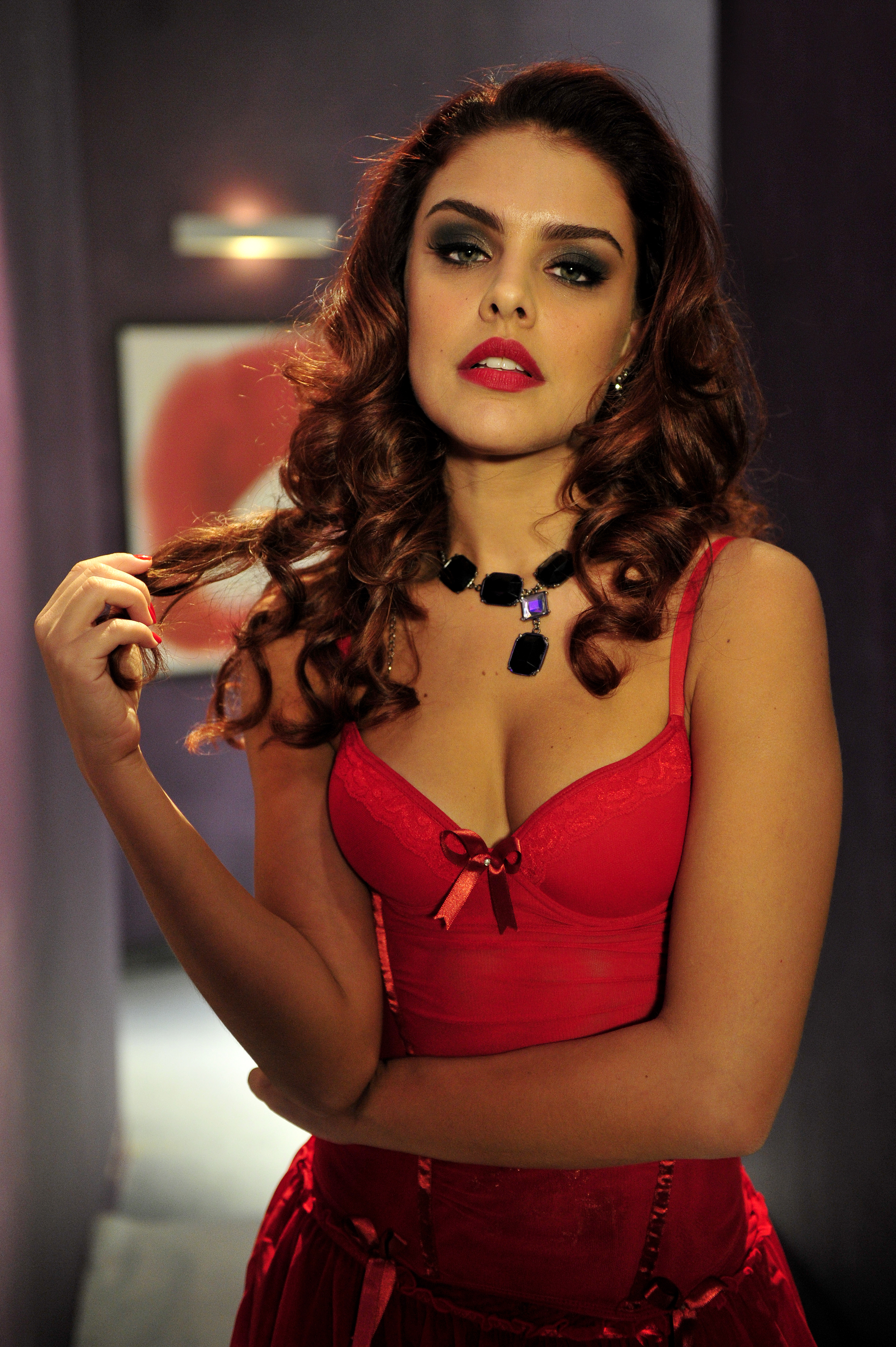
Paloma Bernardi
Alice

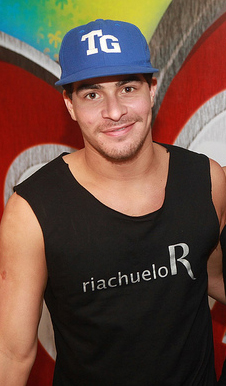
Thiago Martins
Vinícius.

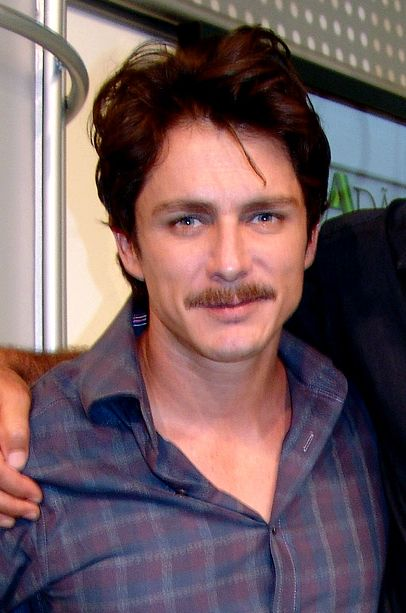
Petrônio Gontijo
Beto

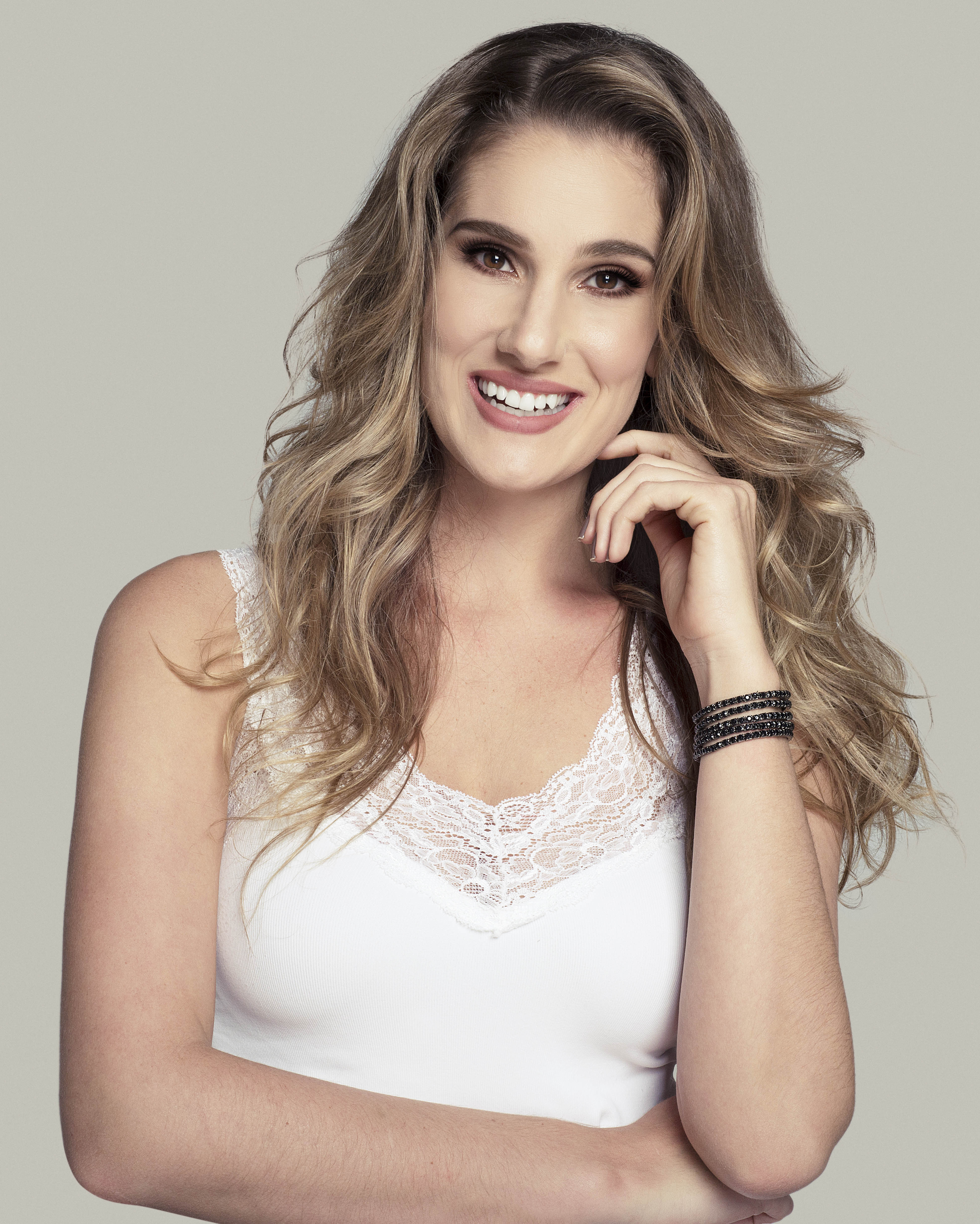
Karina Dohme
Jéssica

== Ratings ==
Timeslot	# Eps.	Premiere		Finale		Rank	Season	Average viewership
Timeslot	# Eps.	Date	Viewers (in points)	Date	Viewers (in points)	Rank	Season	Average viewership
Monday—Saturday; 9:10 pm	185	17 January 2011	36	19 August 2011	47	#1	2011	36

Preceded by Passione; 2010–2011	Globo 9 P.M. timeslot telenovela January 17, 2011–August 19, 2011	Succeeded by Fina Estampa; 2011–2012
