= Helena Fernandes =

Brazilian actress

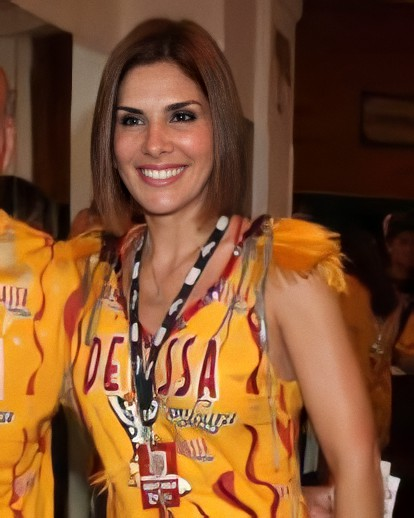
- Fernandes in 2011
- Born: Helena Maria Ferreira Fernandes; 19 October 1967 (age 57); Rio de Janeiro, Brazil
- Occupation: Actress
- Years active: 1985–present
- Spouse: José Alvarenga Júnior (m. 1998)
- Children: 3
- Website: www.bloglog.globo.com/helenafernandes/

Helena Maria Ferreira Fernandes (born 19 October 1967) is a Brazilian actress.

== Career ==
Fernandes has lent her face as a model for several characters of Brazilian television. He began his career in a small role in the soap opera of Carlos Lombardi, Quatro por Quatro. Success, however, came a little later in the soap opera Quem É Você? By Ivani Ribeiro, where he played the bitter Nadia. Due to the high profile of the actress, was invited to join the team in the series Caça Talentos, where he gave life to Silvana, the main antagonist.

Used to playing villains, as noted in Sítio do Picapau Amarelo and Canavial de Paixões in 2005 gave a chance for comedy portraying the character of Ipanema de Jesus show A Diarista. The character was so successful that the cameo character became fixed.

With the end of the diarist, in 2007, made a cameo in Malhação in the same year. In 2008, invited by author Andréa Maltarolli, joined the cast of Beleza Pura, where he lived Marcia, a journalist who formed a pentagon love with the characters of Antonio Calloni, Guilherme Fontes, Soraya Ravenle and Reginaldo Faria.

Also in 2008, participated in a series of episodes of Faça Sua História. In 2009, invited by Glória Barreto and Maria Mariana, went back to the cast of Malhação, this time playing a completely different role than that played the other time: in 2007, interpreted the "station wagon" Scarleth, Bruna Capettini helper (Gabriella Vigolo ) in 2009, Ursula lived, the mother of unscrupulous Caius, the villain played by Humberto Carrão.

With the end of 2009 season of Malhação came to climb to the then novel 19h of the Globe, Tempos Modernos, in which he played Luciana, but such participation does not just occur, since neither the character nor the actress entered the plot. In 2011, Insensato Coração was cast by Gilberto Braga and Ricardo Linhares.

In the film, in the films Se Eu Fosse Você and Adrift, participated in the dubbing of the movie The Incredibles, and was specially invited by Delart to dub version of Alice in Wonderland produced by Tim Burton.

== Personal life ==
She is married to director José Alvarenga Júnior and mother to Yan, Antônio and Lucas.

== Filmography ==
=== Television ===
Year	Title	Role	Notes	Ref.
1994	Quatro por Quatro	Janaina	Cameo	
1996	Quem É Você?	Nádia Mendonça		
1996	Caça Talentos	Silvana Karloff	(1996–1998)	
1998	Labirinto	Letícia Martins		
1999	Força de um Desejo	Srtª. Clara Toledo de Mendonça	Antagonist	
1999	Terra Nostra	Belinha	Cameo	
2000	Vila Madalena	Luiza	Cameo	
2000	Você Decide	Mirthes	Cameo	
2000	Malhação	Dr. Tânia	Cameo	
2001	Roda da Vida	Sofia Albuquerque		
2002	Sítio do Picapau Amarelo	Evil Queen	Cameo	
2002	O Quinto dos Infernos	Chiquinha		
2003	Kubanacan	Marieta	Cameo	
2003	Canavial de Paixões	Raquel Febermann	Main antagonist	
2004	A Diarista	Juliana	Cameo	
2004	Sob Nova Direção	Kátia	Cameo	
2005	A Diarista	Ipanema de Jesus	(2005–2007)	
2007	Malhação	Scarleth	Cameo	
2008	Beleza Pura	Márcia Passos Brito		
2008	Faça Sua História	Marlene	Cameo	
2009	Malhação	Úrsula Lemgruber		
2010	Separação?!	Delegated Leni	Cameo	
2011	Insensato Coração	Gilda Fischer Amaral		
2011	Macho Man	Luiza Fraga		
2012	Malhação	Carmem		
2013	Guerra dos Sexos	Natália	Cameo	
2013	O Dentista Mascarado	Vera		
2013	Sangue Bom	Lana Ferreto	Cameo	
2014	Malhação	Lucrécia Gardel		
2017	Rota de Fuga	Dos Santos	TV movie	
2017	Belaventura	Marión Alencastro Bourbon		
2019	Bom Sucesso	Eugênia Machado	Antagonist	

=== Film ===
Year	Title	Role	Notes	Ref.
2005	The Incredibles	Edna Mode	Brazilian voice dubbing	
2006	Se Eu Fosse Você	Débora		
2009	Divã	Mercedes friend	Cameo	
2009	Adrift	Petúnia		
2009	Os Normais 2 - A Noite mais Maluca de Todas	Woman in hospital	Cameo	
2010	Alice in Wonderland	White Queen	Brazilian voice dubbing	
