= Jamais Te Esquecerei =

Brazilian television series

- Genre: Telenovela
- Created by: Caridad Bravo Adams
- Written by: Ecila Pedroso
- Starring: Ana Paula Tabalipa; Fábio Azevedo
- Opening theme: "Jamais te esquecerei"
- Country of origin: Brazil
- Original language: Portuguese
- No. of seasons: 1
- No. of episodes: 120

Production
- Production location: São Paulo - Brazil
- Camera setup: Multiple-camera setup
- Running time: 60 minutes
- Production company: SBT

Original release
- Network: SBT
- Release: 14 April – 26 September 2003

Related
- Pequena Travessa; Canavial de Paixões; Nunca te olvidaré

Jamais Te Esquecerei (English translation: I Will Never Forget You) is a Brazilian telenovela shown by the SBT between 14 April and 26 September 2003, at 10h30. Based on the original text of Caridad Bravo Adams, it was translated by Henrique Zambelli and adapted by Ecila Pedroso, that also the supervision of text signed, and Enéas Carlos. This 120-episode telenovela was directed by Jacques Lagôa, Sacha and Henrique Martins, with David Grimberg as managing generality of teledrama.

== Plot ==
In Mountain range of the Rocks, a small agricultural city, the adolescents Beatriz (Lorenza Chiamurela) and Danilo (Vitor Morosini) make an oath of perpetual love. However, they do not imagine that immense difficulties created for the destination and obstacles that will have to face would come to materialize the biggest desire of its lives.

The most terrible obstacle is Danilo's mother Leonor (Bia Seidl), a bitter woman. It is who will go to use the most terrible resources to hinder that its son they love Beatriz, therefore it knows that its husband, Antônio (Jonas Bloch), not yet forgets the mother Beatriz and its old passion, Isabela (Tássia Camargo). When young, Antônio and Isabela had been hindered of if marrying for the father of the young woman, compelled who it if to marry another man.

Fifteen years later, Antônio and Isabela if they find, at a moment where it is gives to die. There it promises to take care of the son of it, Beatriz, as if the girl was its proper son. This is the last desire of the young woman. But when perceiving the strong linking between Beatriz and Danilo, the wife of it sees to grow an unhealthy jealousy in its heart and, each more Machiavellian day, separates the couple. Thus, the control of the villainous, Beatriz is registered a convent and Danilo goes to study in the United States.

But Leonor not yet foresees that the time and in the distance goes to become the love enters the intense couple still more. Therefore, already adult, it starts to be the protagonist of a still more perverse tram: been deceptive, Beatriz (Ana Paula Tabalipa) and Danilo (Fábio Azevedo) will believe that they are blood brothers.

The couple will try to run away from the intense passion that one feels for the other, without forgetting the promise and them words that will bring the true happiness for it.

== Cast ==
=== Main actors ===
- Ana Paula Tabalipa - Beatriz
- Fábio Azevedo - Danilo
- Bia Seidl - Leonor
- Danton Mello - Eduardo Moraima
- Marcos Wainberg - Vítor
- Vera Zimmermann - Açucena
- Felipe Folgosi - Álvaro
- Viviane Victorette - Letícia
- Wanderley Cardoso - Adamastor
- Micaela Góes - Sílvia
- Clarisse Abujamra - Alzira
- Delano Avelar - noivo de Leonor
- Rogério Márcico - Samuel
- Magali Biff - Iracema
- Glauce Graieb - Superior Madre
- Chica Lopes - Sister Daisy
- Ana Maria Nascimento e Silva - Irene
- Aldine Müller - Délia
- Rejane Arruda - Branca

=== Special participation ===
- Jonas Bloch - Antônio
- Tássia Camargo - Isabela

=== Also ===
- César Pezzuoli - Justo
- Carine Quadros - Hilda
- Sandra Mara - Madalena
- Jonathan Nogueira - Beto
- Amadeu Lamounier - Léo

== Soundtrack ==
The soundtrack was released in 2003 by label SBT Music with Sony.

1. Jamais Te Esquecerei - Ivan Lins
2. Quase um Segundo - Luiza Possi
3. Que Amor É Esse - Chitãozinho & Xororó
4. Doce Presença - Luanda Cozetti
5. Um Dia a Mais - Zezé Di Camargo & Luciano
6. Resposta ao Tempo - Adriana Godoy
7. Tempestade de Paixão - Guilherme & Santiago
8. Todos os Meus Sentidos - Olivia Heringer
9. Poeira no Vento - Chrystian & Ralf
10. Epitáfio - Gal Costa
11. As Dores do Mundo - Hyldon
12. Incondicionalmente - Vega
13. Onde Anda Você - Toquinho e Vinicius
14. Pra Te Amar - Nila Branco
