= Zach Ashton =

American singer-songwriter

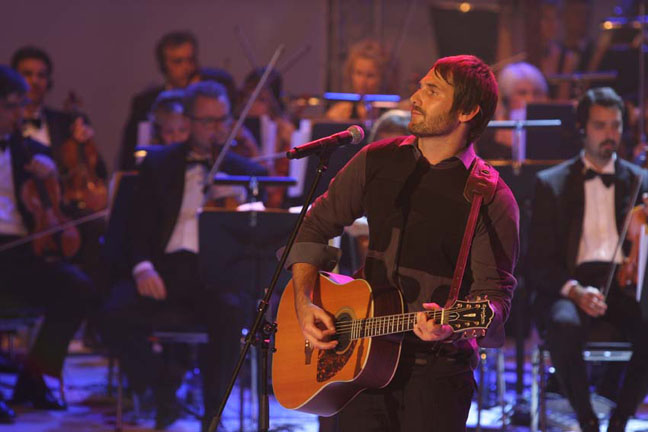
- Zach Ashton performing in Italy.

Background information
- Origin: Clearwater, Florida, United States
- Genres: Pop, Acoustic
- Occupation: Singer-songwriter
- Instruments: Guitar, voice
- Years active: 2002–present
- Labels: Victor Entertainment (Japan) Warner Music Group (Poland) Planet Records (Italy)
- Website: www.zachashton.com

Zach Ashton is a self-taught musician, recording artist and producer. His musical genres include pop, bossa nova, jazz, reggae and acoustic pop. He is noted for using elements of world music within his compositions.

== Discography ==
=== Albums ===
- Mellow Dia (2004)
- Sweet Nothings (2005)
- Marley Rendition (2006)
- Sugar And Spice – Various Tracks (2006)
- Just Like Beautiful (2008)
- The Distance Between Us (2011)
- People & Places (2016)

=== Soundtracks ===
- 2004 Hang – Longboard Surf Film
- 2004 Fox Fuel TV
- 2007 Sete Pecados Rede Globo
- 2007 Malhação Rede Globo
- 2010 Passione Rede Globo

== Compilations ==
- Sete Pecados International Soundtrack (2007) – "Sugar & Spice" Rede Globo
- Malhação Internacional (2007), vol. 2 – "Losing" Som Livre
- "I Really Want You" (2008) – "Small Towns" Warner Music Group
- "Passione" International Soundtrack (2010) – "Say" Rede Globo
