= Se Puder... Dirija! =

2013 film directed by Paulo Fontenelle

- Theatrical release poster
- Directed by: Paulo Fontenelle
- Written by: Paulo Fontenelle
- Starring: Luís Fernando Guimarães; Leandro Hassum; Lavínia Vlasak
- Cinematography: Nonato Estrela; Pedro Guimaraes
- Production companies: Miravista; Total Entertainment
- Distributed by: Buena Vista International
- Release date: 30 August 2013 (Brazil)
- Running time: 84 minutes
- Country: Brazil
- Language: Portuguese
- Budget: R$ 10,000,000
- Box office: R$ 4,490,672.98

Se Puder... Dirija! is a 2013 Brazilian comedy film directed by Paulo Fontenelle and starring Luís Fernando Guimarães. It's the first Brazilian live action 3D format movie.

== Cast ==
- Luís Fernando Guimarães as João
- Leandro Hassum as Ednelson
- Lavínia Vlasak as Ana
- Bárbara Paz as Márcia
- Sandro Rocha
- Reynaldo Gianecchini
- Lívia de Bueno
