= Carine Quadros =

Brazilian actress (born 1981)

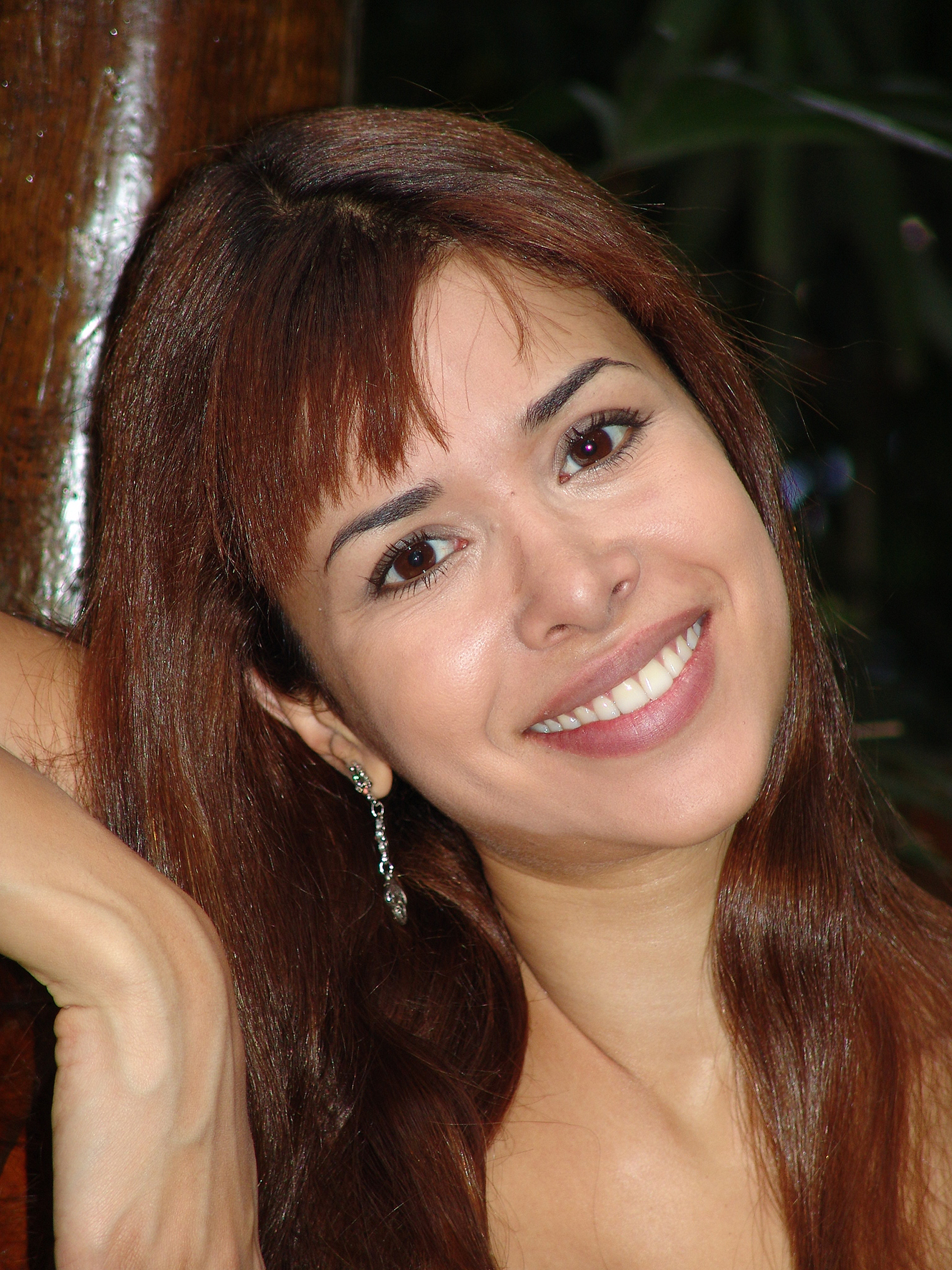
- 2006 photo
- Born: Carine Quadros; September 27, 1981 (age 44); Divinópolis, Minas Gerais, Brazil
- Occupations: Theatre, film & television actress
- Years active: 1995 -

Carine Quadros (born September 27, 1981) is a Brazilian actress.

== Television ==
- 2001 - Porto dos Milagres, Malhação, As filhas da Mãe, O Clone
- 2002 - Globo Ciência, Vale Todo, Coração de Estudante
- 2003 - Jamais Te Esquecerei...Hilda
- 2004 - Vila Maluca...Gigi

2005 - Portos land

== Filmography ==
- 1999 - Boneca de Papel
- 1999 - O Homem Invisível
- 2000 - A Vida de Glauber Rocha
- 2001 - Focus
- 2002 - Divergências
- 2004 - Garotos da Cidade
