= Sete Pecados =

Brazilian telenovela by Walcyr Carrasco

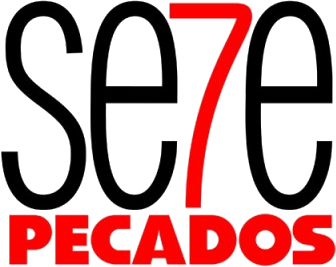
- Created by: Walcyr Carrasco
- Directed by: Jorge Fernando
- Starring: Priscila Fantin; Reynaldo Gianecchini; Giovanna Antonelli; Cláudia Raia; Paulo Betti; Marcelo Novaes; Cláudia Jimenez; Elizabeth Savalla; Gabriela Duarte; Mel Lisboa; Samara Felippo; Nívea Stelmann; Malvino Salvador; Rodrigo Phavanello and other.
- Opening theme: Carne e Osso
- Composer: Zélia Duncan
- Country of origin: Brazil
- Original language: Portuguese
- No. of episodes: 208

Production
- Production locations: São Paulo, Brazil
- Running time: 45 minutes
- Production company: Central Globo de Produção

Original release
- Network: Rede Globo
- Release: 18 June 2007 – 15 February 2008

Sete Pecados (Seven Sins) is a Brazilian telenovela produced and broadcast by TV Globo. It was written by Walcyr Carrasco, with Claudia Soto and Andre Ryoki. The directors were Jorge Fernando, Pedro Vasconcelos and Fred Mayrink. Fernando worked with the same directing cast on his previous telenovelas Chocolate com Pimenta and Alma Gêmea. Sete Pecados debuted on 18 June 2007 and aired for the last time on 15 February 2008, with 209 episodes. It aired at 7 p.m., replacing Pé na Jaca in this time slot. In turn it was replaced by Beleza Pura.

== Plot ==
Dr. Flávio, a rich archeologist, is married to Rebeca and he has a daughter, Beatriz. He also has a romance with the young daughter of an employee, Cidinha. Before the main storyline begins, he sets out on an expedition to find traces of Atlantis. An accident occurs and it is reported that Flávio died. However, his body was never found.

Years pass, and Beatriz inherits Flávio's fortune. She is a beautiful, young, rich, but stubborn woman. For her, life is an eternal search for pleasure. She takes care of her mother Rebeca, her stepfather Anselmo, her grandmother Corina, half-brother Ariel and half-sister Daniela with her inheritance.

One day, she meets a high-school friend, a taxi driver named Dante, who is a simple and ethical man. In a moment of crisis, he offers her help. She decides to flirt with him, but he is not interested in her. Her pride prevents her from admitting that she is in love with a man who does not want her.

Beatriz sets out to win Dante over. She meets "Baron", a guru who is connected to a secret society, run by a mysterious woman, Agatha. Beatriz offers her soul to be with Dante, but Baron says that if she wants Dante she needs to change him. Dante is a man with a golden heart and unwavering sincerity. To change Dante's life, he needs to practice the Seven Sins, one by one. Only then will he leave his ethical principles and abandon his wife Clarice and his children Isabel and Laerte.

The secret society has a hidden goal. Flávio left his whole fortune to his daughter, as well as a mysterious statue. Agatha wants to steal Beatriz's fortune and the statue by manipulating Beatriz through her passion for Dante. Beatriz doesn't suspect Agatha's real interests, and invites her to be the director of her nightclub.

=== The Sins ===
The Seven Sins are Envy, Anger, Vanity (Pride), Sloth, Gluttony, Avarice (Greed) and Lust. In this telenovela, each character expresses one or more sins.

- Envy – the ambitious Agatha wants Beatriz under her command. More than this, Agatha wants to have Beatriz's life. She plans to use her secret society to achieve her goals. Agatha believes that the secret of immortality is hidden in Beatriz's statue.
- Anger – Pedro is a famous chef de cuisine, owner of a restaurant. He is in love with Beatriz and wants to marry her. He will do anything to discredit Dante because of Beatriz's passion for him.
- Vanity – Rebeca always wanted to be part of high society. Thanks to her daughter's fortune, she is living in Beatriz's house with her new husband Anselmo, with whom she fell in love soon after she gave birth to Beatriz. Anselmo is a lazy failure and with Rebeca he has two children, daughter Daniela and son Ariel. Rebeca is Beatriz's major confidant and partner. She is addicted to beauty treatments, plastic surgeries and botox.
- Sloth – Rodolfo's family was once rich, but is now poor. His mother, Otília, is a lazy woman and is trying to manipulate her rich brother Romeu into giving her money. Rodolfo's brother, Victor, is the only one in the family who wants to work. Rodolfo owns a small antique shop and works there to survive. Despite his lack of resources, Rodolfo lives as if he were rich. He is lazy and spends money stupidly.
- Gluttony – Perseu owns the pizzeria "King of Gluttony", located in Dante's neighbourhood. He is married to Minerva and is the father of Ulysses and Irene. The family can't stop eating, which is risking the restaurant's bankruptcy. Néia is Perseu's business partner. She decides to put the family on strict diet, monitoring every slice they take.
- Avarice – Romeu, the richest man in Dante's vicinity, is Otília's brother and Rodolfo's uncle. Romeu knows that Otília and Rodolfo only want his fortune. Romeu fought hard to build his empire and is very unwilling to spend money. His only true relationship happened when he was an adolescent, with a woman named Juju. His family separated him from Juju and Romeu left the area as a poor man. Now that he is rich, he decides to hire a private detective to locate Juju. With Eudoxia's help, Romeu discovers that Juju is a widow. He is afraid that she will be interested in him only for his money, and he returns to his old neighbourhood pretending to be poor.
- Lust – Clarice's younger sister Carla acts as if she is the most attractive woman in the world. She is in love with Dante, although she is dating Aquiles. Carla gets a job in Beatriz's nightclub, where she plots with Agatha and Baron.

=== The Virtues ===
Several characters, including Dante and his wife Clarice, possess virtues that contrast with the sins. In the beginning, Clarice believes that Beatriz is her best friend and confides in her, even though her mother Agripina warns her against Beatriz. During the series, she discovers that Beatriz is not her friend, but her rival.

- Courage – Miriam is the courageous director of a public school filled with problems. She faces difficult students and teachers as well as financial difficulties. Her brother Aquiles – Carla's boyfriend – is a taxi driver, as is his father Nino. Her mother Palma is a housewife. Vincente, professor of physical education, becomes involved with Miriam, but Simone, the sister of Vicente's late wife, stands in the way of their happiness. Vincente is also Benta's good friend. Benta was abandoned on the street by her father. She is a girl with special powers.

Custódia is Beatriz's guardian angel. Custódia disguised herself as a fortune-teller, and convinced Beatriz that she will be happy only when she finds a man with the soul of an angel. However, Custodia didn't see in her cards that this man was married. To help Beatriz, Custódia becomes her maid, along with the archangel Gabriel.

Later, Beatriz realizes that Agatha is really Cidinha, Dr. Flávio's childhood sweetheart. But nobody realizes that Flávio, whom everyone thought was dead, will appear again to change the course of history.

== Cast ==
=== Main cast ===
- Priscila Fantin – Beatriz Ferraz
- Reynaldo Gianecchini – Dante Florentino
- Giovanna Antonelli – Clarice Florentino
- Cláudia Raia – Agatha/Maria Aparecida
- Cláudia Jimenez – Custódia
- Paulo Betti – Flavio Ferraz
- Elizabeth Savalla – Rebeca
- Mel Lisboa – Carla
- Sidney Sampaio – Pedro
- Gabriela Duarte – Miriam de Freitas
- Marcelo Novaes – Vicente de Freitas
- Samara Felippo – Simone
- Nívea Stelmann – Elvira de Sousa Florentino
- Malvino Salvador – Regis Florentino
- Ary Fontoura – Romeu
- Nicette Bruno – Julieta "Juju" Verona
- Rodrigo Phavanello – Adriano Verona
- Rafael Calomeni – Hercules
- Erik Marmo – Gabriel
- Rosamaria Murtinho – Otilia de Sant'anna
- Marcelo Medici – Antero/Zizi/Tiao/Sheng Leng
- Max Fercondini – Aquiles
- Marisol Ribeiro – Eliete
- Duda Nagle – Ariel
- Marco Antonio Gimenez – Victor
- Rosanne Mulholland – Daniela
- Suely Franco – Agripina
- Isabel Fillardis – Fatima
- Ilya São Paulo – Elias
- Márcia Cabrita – Eudoxia Fagundes
- Thalma de Freitas – Berenice
- Juan Alba – Rodolfo Sant'anna
- Kayky Brito – Xongas
- Cecília Dassi – Estela Verona
- Carla Diaz – Gina
- Wanda Grandi – Tamires
- Roberto Bataglin – Teobaldo Verona
- Ricardo Duque – Marcelo
- Renata Castro Barbosa – Adalgisa
- Ary França – Professor Lineu
- Malu Valle – Palma
- Flávio Migliaccio – Nino
- Hilda Rebello – Corina
- Lígia Cortez – Amélia
- Ilva Niño – Marli
- Darlan Cunha – Sandro
- Odilon Wagner – Anselmo Silvinno
- Rosane Gofman – Néia
- Zé Victor Castiel – Perseu
- Valéria Sândalo – Minerva
- Wagner Santisteban – Ulisses
- Carina Porto – Irene
- Rafael Zulu – Leonardo
- Rafael Ciani – Danilo Verona
- Henri Pagnoncelli – Dr. Reginaldo
- Abrahão Farc – Silas
- Alexandro Malvão – Maciel
- Juliana Poggi – Janaína
- Maria Carollina – Raquel
- Sérgio Fonta – Renato
- Rangel de Oliveira – Tito Lesma
- Bruno Kimura – Shiro San
- Wilson Rabello – Jair

=== Children ===
- Marina Ruy Barbosa – Isabel Florentino
- Amanda Azevedo – Benta Nascimento da Silva Freitas
- Tiago Salomone – Laerte Florentino
- Danielle Robles – Dilma
- Gustavo Santos – Ciro

=== Special appearances/guests ===
- Aílton Graça – Baron
- Carlos Casagrande – Amadeu
- Ana Lúcia Torre – Guilhermina
- Cristiana Oliveira – Margareth
- John Herbert – Schmidt
- Leilah Moreno – Nalah
- Maria Zilda Bethlem – Cíntia
- Mário Gomes – Amadeu
- Jéssica Golcci – Angélica
- Susana Werner – Elvira's friend
- Guilherme Piva – Joílson
- André Delucca – Carlão
- Jonas Torres – Francisco Florentino
- Ângela Leal – Edith
- Lupe Gigliotti – Nair
- Sabrina Rosa – Verônica Nascimento da Silva
- Bruno Giordano – Anderson
- Clarice Derzié Luz – Xongas's mother
- Jaime Leibovitch – Angel
- Íris Nascimento – Antônia Nascimento da Silva
- Virginia Lane – Corina's friend
- Mário Cardoso – Davi
- Pietro Mário – Eurípedes
- Beth Erthal – Baroness
- Hélio Ribeiro – Figueira
- Ada Chaseliov – Marcelo's lover
- Caco Baresi – Marcelo's brother
- Diego Hypólito – himself
- Rô Santana – Zilda
- Gaspar Filho – Ed Tavares
- Adilson Magah – Evaristo
- Renan Horta – Nico
- André Santinho – Fred
- Luma Antunes – Lilian
- Rafael Raposo – Peninha
- Ana Tereza – Valdirene
- Popó – himself

== Soundtrack ==
=== Brazil soundtrack ===
- Tema de Não Quero Ver Você Triste – Marisa Monte and Erasmo Carlos (song for Beatriz and Dante)
- Deixo (Live) – Ivete Sangalo (song for Clarice and Dante)
- Eu Vou Seguir (Reach) – Marina Elali (song for Miriam)
- Anjo – Fábio Jr. (song for Dante)
- Um Anjo Muito Especial (My Special Angel) – Roupa Nova (song for Custódia, Gabriel and Berenice)
- Teletema – Ivo Pessoa (song for Elvira)
- Preciso Ser Amado – Tim Maia (song for Vicente)
- Nossa História de Amor – Maurício Mattar (song for Eliete and Ariel)
- Luxúria – Isabella Taviani (song for Carla)
- Deixa Isso pra Lá – Lulu Santos (song for Régis)
- Não Faz Mal a Ninguém – Lenine (song for Beatriz)
- Carne e Osso – Zélia Duncan (Opening song)
- Exaustino – Zeca Pagodinho (song for Rodolfo)
- Gula – Eduardo Dusek (song for Minerva, Perseu, Irene and Ulisses)
- Pão-Duro – Rodrigo Santos (song for Romeu)
- Ira (A Lira da Ira) – Cláudio Zoli (song for Pedro)
- Contrato Assinado – Deborah Blando (song for Agatha)
- Vaidade – Luciana Mello (song for Rebeca)

=== International soundtrack ===
- LDN – Lily Allen (song for location)
- Rehab – Amy Winehouse (song for Rebeca)
- Baby Baby Baby – Joss Stone (song for Elvira)
- Until the End – Norah Jones (song for Flávio)
- Like A Star – Corinne Bailey Rae (song for Dante and Beatriz)
- Over My Head (Cable Car) – The Fray (song for location)
- Divine – Colin Munroe (song for Xongas and Estela/song for Adriano and Custódia)
- Bubbly – Colbie Caillat (song for Clarice)
- Million Faces – Paolo Nutini (song for location)
- She's Madonna – Robbie Williams (song for São Paulo)
- Reach – Gloria Estefan (song for Miriam)
- Sugar and Spice – Zach Ashton (song for location)
- The Story – Brandi Carlile (song for Clarice and Dante)
- Love is A Many-Splendored Thing – Matt Monro (song for Juju and Romeu)

=== Naraka Club Soundtrack ===
- Beautiful Liar – Beyoncé and Shakira
- Cupid's Chokehold – Gym Class Heroes
- Girlfriend (Dr. Luke Mix) – Avril Lavigne and Lil Mama
- Never Again (Dave Audé Club Mix) – Kelly Clarkson
- Love Is Gone – David Guetta, Chris Willis and Joachim Garraud
- Always and Forever (Bob Sinclar Remix) – Chocolate Puma
- Yeah Yeah (D. Ramirez Radio Edit) – Luciana and Bodyrox
- A Noite Perfeita – Leoni and George Israel
- Sympathy for the Devil – Freedom Dub
- Afrojazz (instrumental) – Taylor M.
- Sinistro's Dance (instrumental) – Hitz
- Boogie 2nite (Seamus Haji Big Love Radio Mix) – Bootyluv
- Every Minute – Deborah Blando
- Turn the Lights Off (Original Mix) – DJ José
- Stand Up (Maxpop Extended) – Ramada
- It's a Sin (Pet Shop Boys Cover) – Fher Cassini
- Everybody's Free (To Feel Good) – Rozalla

== Trivia ==
- This is the second time that Reynaldo Gianecchini and Giovanna Antonelli have played a romantic pair. They were a couple in the beginning of the telenovela "Da Cor do Pecado" (The Color of Sin). In this telenovela, however, Giovanna plays a positive character; in "Da Cor do Pecado" her character was a villain.
- This is also the second time that Reynaldo Gianecchini and Priscila Fantin have played a romantic pair. They were a couple in a period telenovela called "Terra Esperanca" (The Land of Hope).
- Walcyr Carrasco and Priscila Fantin have both worked with director Jorge Fernando three times. The first time was in "Chocolate com Pimenta" (where Priscila was a villain) and the second in "Alma Gêmea" (where Priscila was a protagonist).
- Duda Nagle (Ariel) plays the role of a teenage boy who becomes a father at the end of the telenovela. He had similar roles in the telenovelas "America" and "Paginas da Vida".
- Maria Zilda Bethlem left the cast of Sete Pecados saying that she would be cast in the telenovela Beleza Pura (Pure Beauty), which succeeded Sete Pecados in the 7 pm slot. However, she did not appear in Beleza Pura.
- The telenovela's highest rating came when the main villain, Agatha, died in an explosion. This plot point came about when Claudia Raia left the telenovela because she was disappointed with her character.
- This was the first telenovela for the following actors: Rosanne Mulholland (Daniela), Amanda de Azevedo (Benta), James Salomone (Laerte), Danielle Robles (Dilma), Bruno Kimura (San Shiro), Carina Porto (Irene), Rafael Zulu (Leonardo), Rangel Oliveira (Tito) and Juliana Poggi (Janaína).
- This was the first time that Sydney Sampaio played a villain in a telenovela.
- Rodrigo Phavanello (Adriano) and Claudia Jimenez (Custodia) started dating when the series ended.
- Jorge Fernando's mother starred in the series, playing Beatriz's grandmother Corina. She also starred in her son's productions "Chocolate com Pimenta" and "Alma Gêmea".
- Duda Nagle (Ariel) and Priscila Fantin (Beatriz) were dating during the filming of the series.

== International Broadcasts ==
Argentina Telefe 23 June 2008 –
Uruguay Teledoce 2009
Poland Zone Romantica 14 February 2011
Armenia Armenia TV 2007–2008

Preceded by Pé na Jaca	Rede Globo's Novela das Sete; June 2007 – February 2008	Succeeded by Beleza Pura
