= Nathalia Timberg =

Brazilian actress (born 1929)

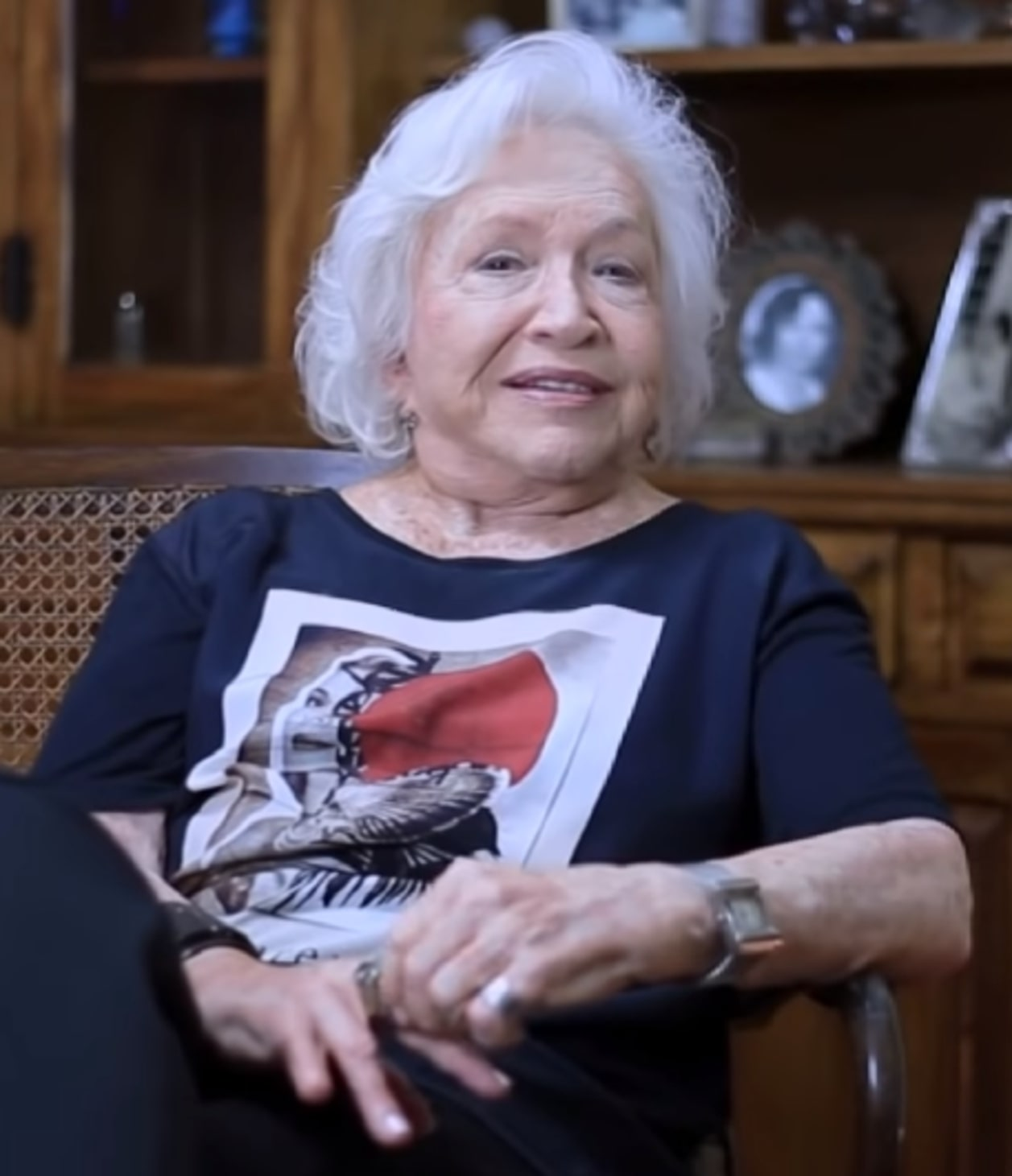
- Timberg in 2019
- Born: Nathalia Elisa Timberg; 5 August 1929 (age 97); Rio de Janeiro, Brazil
- Occupation: Actress
- Years active: 1954–present
- Spouse: Sylvan Paezzo (m. 1966; div. 1980)

Nathalia Timberg (born 5 August 1929) is a Brazilian actress. She is celebrated as one of the best and most well known Brazilian actresses of cinema, theater and television.

== Life and career ==
Nathalia was born in Rio de Janeiro, Brazil on 5 August 1929. Of Jewish origin, she is the daughter of a Polish father and a Belgian mother.

== Selected filmography ==
- A Muralha (1968)
- A Sucessora (1978)
- Pantanal (1990)
- Éramos Seis (1994)
- Força de um Desejo (1999)
- Porto dos Milagres (2001)
- O Quinto dos Infernos (2002)
- Celebridade (2003)
- Páginas da Vida (2006)
- Insensato Coração (2011)
- Amor à Vida (2013)
- Babilônia (2015)
- A Dona do Pedaço (2019)
- Fuzuê (2023)
- Velhos Bandidos (2026)
