= Beleza Pura =

2008 Brazilian telenovela

- Genre: Telenovela
- Created by: Andrea Maltarolli
- Written by: Emanoel Jacobina; Ricardo Hoffstetter; Daisy Chaves; Flávia Bessone; João Brandão
- Directed by: Rogério Gomes
- Starring: Edson Celulari; Regiane Alves; Christiane Torloni; Carolina Ferraz; Humberto Martins; Reginaldo Faria; Zezé Polessa; Kadu Moliterno
- Theme music composer: Caetano Veloso
- Opening theme: "Beleza Pura" by Skank
- Country of origin: Brazil
- Original language: Portuguese
- No. of seasons: 1
- No. of episodes: 179

Production
- Camera setup: Multi-camera

Original release
- Network: TV Globo
- Release: 18 February – 13 September 2008

Beleza Pura (English: Pure Beauty) is a Brazilian telenovela produced and broadcast by TV Globo. It premiered on 18 February 2008, replacing Sete Pecados, and ended on 13 September 2008, replaced by Três Irmãs. It is written by the Andrea Maltarolli, with the collaboration of Emanoel Jacobina, Ricardo Hoffstetter, Daisy Chaves, Flávia Bessone, and João Brandão.

It stars Edson Celulari, Regiane Alves, Christiane Torloni, Carolina Ferraz, Humberto Martins, Reginaldo Faria, Zezé Polessa, and Kadu Moliterno.

== Cast ==
- Edson Celulari as Guilherme Medeiros
- Regiane Alves as Drª. Joana da Silva
- Christiane Torloni as Sônia Amarante / Estela Fonseca
- Carolina Ferraz as Norma Gusmão
- Humberto Martins as Dr. Renato Reis
- Werner Schünemann as Tomás Fonseca Guimarães
- Reginaldo Faria as Dr. Olavo Pederneiras / Copacabana
- Zezé Polessa as Ivete dos Santos
- Kadu Moliterno as Dr. Gaspar Saldanha
- Maria Clara Gueiros as Suzy
- Leopoldo Pacheco as Raul
- Ísis Valverde as Rakelli dos Santos
- Marcelo Faria as Robson Pederneiras
- Carol Castro as Sheila Cabral
- Bruno Mazzeo as Dr. José Henrique Soares
- Mônica Martelli as Helena Cister / Mateus Cister
- Rodrigo Veronese as Mateus Cister / Tânia Císter
- Antônio Calloni as Eduardo Passos
- Soraya Ravenle as Débora Brito
- Helena Fernandes as Márcia Passos
- Guilherme Fontes as Alex Brito
- Monique Alfradique as Fernanda Brito
- Bianca Comparato as Luiza Passos
- Paulo Vilela as Anderson dos Santos
- Ana Lima as Regina
- Rodrigo Lopéz as Betão
- Rafael Cardoso as Klaus Amarante
- Gustavo Leão as Felipe Cascudo
- Letícia Isnard as Meu Bem / Valmiréia Assumpção Jensen
- Pedro Brício as Erick Jensen
- Bia Montez as Assumpção
- Elias Andreato as Adamastor
- Hélio Ribeiro as Dr. Ciro Sanches
- Marcella Valente as Bia
- Ernani Moraes as Milton
- Jairo Mattos as Ivar Jensen
- Adriana Birolli as Viviane
- André Abujamra as Dr. Thiago
- Eduardo Succini as Dr. Sérgio
- Fabiana Valor as Íris
- André Luiz Rocha as Severino
- Luciana Fregolente as Vilma
- Cibele Larrama as Carol
- Aline Borges as Luana
- Jéssica Mancini as Cris
- Simone Pontes as Juracy
- Lucianna Martins as Camila
- Clarissa Freire as Tamires
- Vinícius Soares as Zé
- Mickey Leão as Armandinho
- Sabrina Marques as Tereza
- Poliana Aleixo as Dominique Amarante
- David Lucas as Hugo Císter

=== Special guests ===
- Vanessa Lóes as Eleonora Amarante
- Michel Bercovitch as Celso Torres
- Maria Gladys as Romena
- Duda Ribeiro as Lino
- Jorge Lucas as Leno
- Márcia Cabrita as Gina
- Ellen Rocche as Gleice
- Cláudio Galvan as Jurandir Feitosa
- Luciano Huck as himself
- Elaine Mickely as Miriam
- Christiano Cochrane as Rodrigo
- Gianne Albertoni as Musa do Carcará
- Fernanda Lima as herself
- Ana Maria Braga as herself
- Rita Cadilac as herself
- Luíza Brunet as herself
- Gabriella Vigol as Bebel
- Leonardo Jabbour as Zé Júnior
- Luiz Nicolau as PéasdeasCabra
- Mauricio Marques as Sanguessuga
- Ed Oliveira as Augusto
- Créo Kellab as MC Baratão
- Ricardo Kosovski as Paulo Abreu
- Chico Terrah as Detetive
- Ernesto Piccolo as Eugênio
- Daniel Lobo as Miguel
- Marcelo Assumpção as Ricardo Mendes
- Henrique César as Genealogista
- Jaime Leibovitch as Castro
- Cláudio Caparica as Garçon
- Bruna Pietronave as Alessandra
- Brendha Haddad as Ipanema
- Carla Faour as Rosa
- Adriana Quadros as Nadir
- Sônia de Paula as Castorina
- Rodrigo dos Santos as Orlandino
- Emílio Pitta as Professor Antunes
- Cláudia Borioni as Madame Katina
- Willian Vita as Cicatriz

== Soundtrack ==
=== National ===
1. Dois Lados - Frejat (Norma's theme)
2. Beleza Pura - Skank (opening sequence theme)
3. Independente (Ladies Night) - Wanessa Camargo (location theme)
4. Vem pra Ficar - Monica Besser (young cast theme)
5. Madrugada - João Estrella (location theme)
6. Veja Bem, Meu Bem - Ney Matogrosso (Helena's theme)
7. Me Deixa em Paz - Seu Jorge & Teresa Cristina (Ivete and Gaspar's theme)
8. Tu Sais Je Vais T´aimer (Eu Sei que Vou Te Amar) - Marcio Faraco & Nana Caymmi (Joana and Guilherme's theme)
9. Coisas do Coração - José Augusto (Eduardo and Débora's theme)
10. Acontece - Jane Duboc (Robson's theme)
11. Coração Vagabundo - Ana Cañas (Renato's theme)
12. Malemolência - Céu (Felipe's theme)
13. Pé de Nabo - Sandra Peres (Joana's theme)
14. Argumento - Paulinho da Viola (location theme)
15. Esnoba - Banda Moinho (Rakelli and Robson's theme; Rakelli's theme)

=== International ===
1. Apologize - Timbaland & OneRepublic (Guilherme's theme)
2. I'll Be Waiting - Lenny Kravitz (Joana and Renato's theme)
3. Tattoo - Jordin Sparks (location theme)
4. With You - Chris Brown (Klaus and Fernanda's theme)
5. Love Song - Sara Bareilles (Felipe and Luiza's theme)
6. Mercy - Duffy (Raul and Suzy's theme)
7. Set Me Free (Unplugged) - House Boulevard (location theme)
8. So Small - Carrie Underwood
9. Show Me - John Legend (location theme)
10. One of Those Nights - Heath Brandon (Sônia and Guilherme's theme)
11. Those Dancing Days are Gone - Carla Bruni (location theme)
12. What I Miss About You - Katie Melua (Eduardo and Débora's theme)
13. Never Meant to Hurt You - Wire Daisies (main love theme)
14. Disco Lies - Moby (Norma's theme)
15. Set Me Free (Radio Edit) - House Boulevard (general theme)
16. Never Can Say Goodbye - Gloria Gaynor (Robson e Rakelli's theme)
