= Isabel Fillardis =

Brazilian actress and model (born 1973)

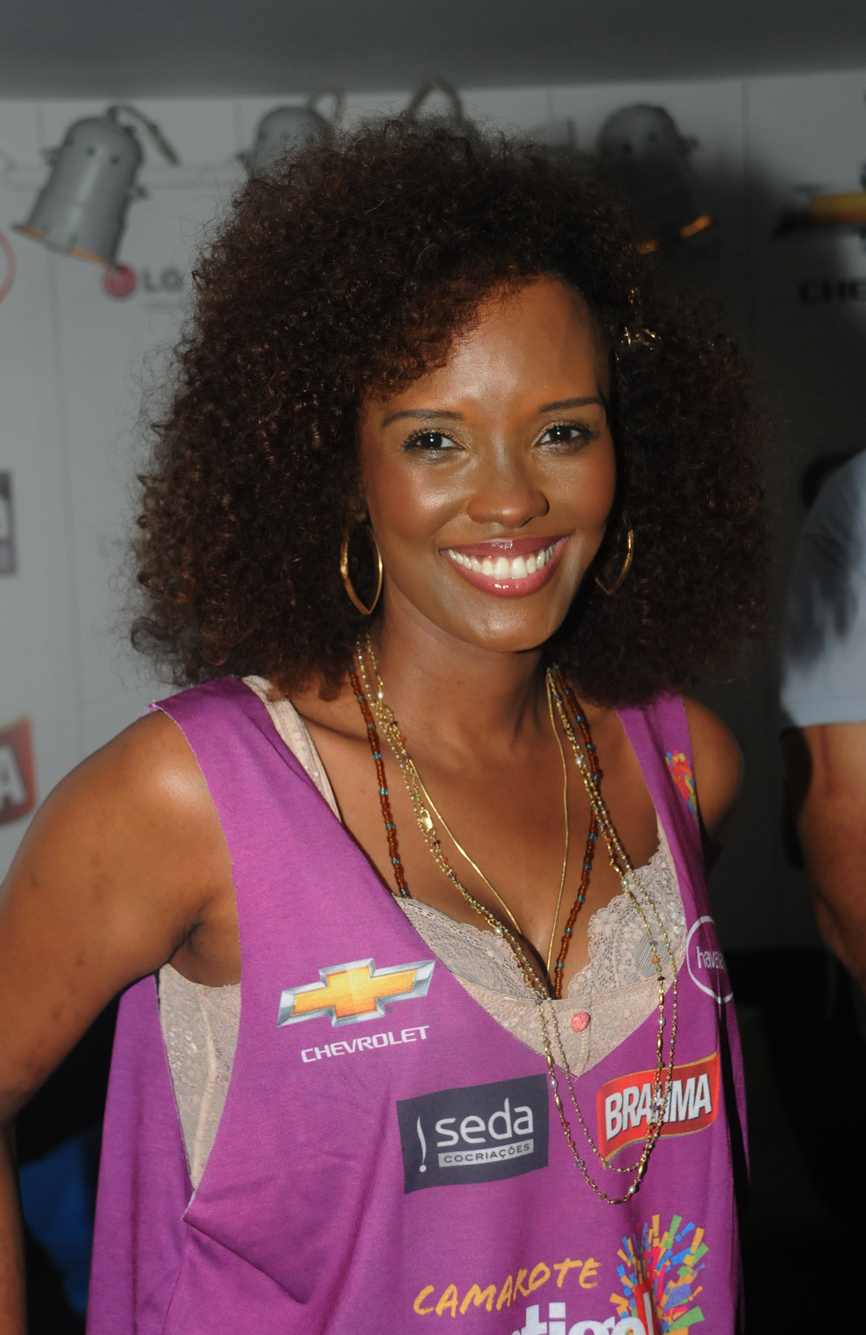
- Isabel in the carnival of 2012
- Born: Isabel Cristina Teodoro Fillardis; August 3, 1973 (age 52); Rio de Janeiro, Brazil
- Occupations: Actress, model

Isabel Cristina Teodoro Fillardis (born August 3, 1973, in Rio de Janeiro, Brazil) is a Brazilian actress and model.

== Career ==
Fillardis began her career as a model at age 11, and at 15 she became a professional model. Two years later, at the insistence of her agency, Ford Models, she marked her acting debut in the role of "Ritinha" in Renascer, a soap opera aired by TV Globo. She participated as one of three members in the girl group Sublimes, which had ephemeral success in the 1990s. In November 1996, she posed nude for Playboy magazine.

Fillardis has starred in several telenovelas like A Lua Me Disse, Começar de Novo, A Padroeira, Força de um Desejo, Corpo Dourado, A Indomada, O Fim do Mundo, A Próxima Vítima, and Pátria Minha.

In films, Fillardis appeared in Orfeu, Navalha na Carne, and O Homem Nu.

In 2007, Fillardis joined the cast of the telenovela Sete Pecados, created by Walcyr Carrasco, and in 2008, she joined the cast of the television series Malhação.

In 2011, the actress made a cameo in the last chapter of the soap opera Insensato Coração, playing the lawyer Mônica Fina Estampa in the telenovela.

== Personal life ==
From 2000 to 2015, she was married to engineer Júlio César Santos with whom she has three children: Analuz, Jamal, and Kalel.

Two months after the birth of her son, Jamal Anuar, she discovered that he was a carrier of West syndrome, a type of epilepsy that alters the development of mind. Stirred, she decided to plead for the cause of disease carriers, and in 2006 launched the forces of good, dedicated to promoting assistance to persons who require special care (visual, mental, hearing, and/or motor disabilities) and who do not have the financial means to do so. In 2003, she founded the NGO Donate Your Junk, focused on socio-environmental area.

== Filmography ==
=== Television ===
Year	Title	Role	Notes
1993	Renascer	Rita de Cássia (Ritinha)	
1994	Pátria Minha	Yone Ribeiro	
1995	A Próxima Vítima	Rosângela Moraes	
1995–97	Globo Ciência	Presenter	
1996	O Fim do Mundo	Marialva	
1997	A Indomada	Inês de Mendonça e Albuquerque	
1997	Você Decide	Mari	Episode: "Enrascada"
1998	Corpo Dourado	Noêmia	
1998	Você Decide	Edith	Episode: "Das Duas Uma"
1999	Você Decide	Margareth	Episode: "Na Passarela do Samba"
1999	Força de um Desejo	Luzia	
2000	Garotas do Programa	Various characters	
2002	A Padroeira	Clarice dos Anjos	Episodes: "January 11 – February 23"
2004	Começar de Novo	Eurídice	
2005	A Lua Me Disse	Violeta da Mata Dantas	
2006	Linha Direta	Victim	Episode: "O Bandido da Luz Vermelha"
2007	Sete Pecados	Fátima	
2008	Malhação	Rita de Cássia Dutra Berguer Rios	Season 15
2011	Insensato Coração	Marise	Episode: "August 19, 2011"
2011	Fina Estampa	Dra. Mônica Ramos	
2012	Amor Eterno Amor	Maria	Episode: "September 7, 2012"
2018	Dancing Brasil	Participant	Season 3
2021	Gênesis	Amanishakheto	
2022	The Masked Singer Brasil	Abacaxi	Season 2
2023	Amor Perfeito	Aparecida Madureira	

=== Film ===
Year	Title	Role	Notes
1997	O Homem Nu	Marialva	
1997	Navalha na Carne		
1999	Orfeu	Mira	
2006	Alabê de Jerusalém	Friend of Jesus No. 2	Direct-to-video
2009	Flordelis - Basta uma Palavra para Mudar	Joana	
