= Viviane Victorette =

Brazilian actress (born 1978)

- Born: December 15, 1978 (age 47); Fortaleza, Brazil
- Occupation: Actress
- Children: 1

Viviane Victorette (born December 15, 1978, in Fortaleza) is a Brazilian actress.

== Career ==
Viviane began her career in her hometown of Fortaleza. As a teenager, she made some plays and advertising campaigns. In 1999, she moved to Rio de Janeiro, to expand her opportunities for success. She studied at the Art House of Orange, in the south of Rio, and met director Marcelo Andrade, who invited her to several children's plays, like Snow White.

She auditioned for TV Globo, in 2001, prime time, the role of "Regininha", which led to the award of revelation in the "Festival of Film and Television Natal". She returned to television on the invitation of Aguinaldo Silva, to act on Duas Caras.

In September 2005, Victorette made the cover of Playboy magazine. She was invited to be the queen of the samba school drum Reborn Jacarepaguá, but withdrew and was replaced by actress Rita Guedes. In the same year she traveled to rest and stayed away from the revelry.

She returned in 2011 for a part as a girl from the Jana program, in Insensato Coração. After two years of preparation, she returned to TV Series in Flor do Caribe, interpreting Marinalva, a dancer. In 2015 she returned to a quick participation in Malhação, as one of Uodson's sweethearts (Lucas Lucco).

== Personal life ==
The actress was married to photographer Diego Suassuna, who has a daughter named Júlia.

== Filmography ==
Television
Year	Title	Role	Notes
1997	Mandacaru	Rosário	
1998	Torre de Babel	Débora	Cameo
1999	Força de um Desejo	Clarissa	Cameo
2002	O Clone	Regininha (Regina da Costa)	
2003	Jamais Te Esquecerei	Letícia	
2003	Carga Pesada	Janete	Episode: "O Passado Me Condena"
2005	América	Júlia (Ju)	
2006	A Grande Família	Tatiane	Episode: "O Dia da Surpresa"
2006	A Diarista	Suelen	Episode: "Aquele da Perseguição"
2007	Duas Caras	Nadir	
2011	Insensato Coração	Jana	Cameo
2013	Flor do Caribe	Marinalva	
2015	Malhação	Uodson girlfriend	Cameo

Film
Year	Title	Role
2010	Segurança Nacional	Fernanda
