= Carla Lamarca =

Brazilian VJ

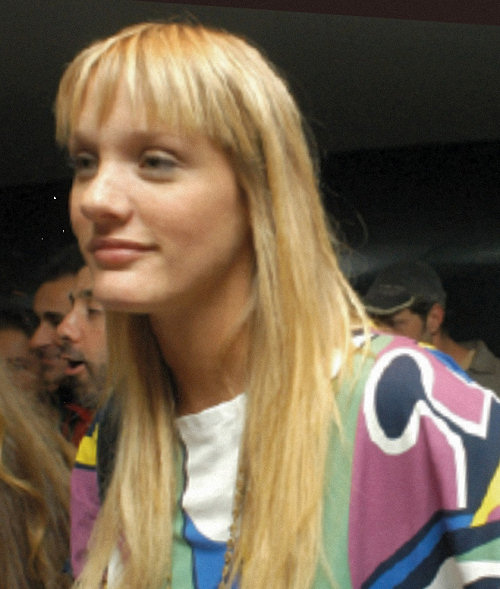
Carla Lamarca, November 2006

Carla Angyalossy Lamarca (born June 6, 1982, in São Paulo) is a Brazilian actress, model, and former MTV VJ. She is of Italian and German descent. She is a graduate of FAAP promotional publicity program. Prior to MTV, Lamarca worked in product development at Miss Sixty. She was elected an MTV VJ by a public vote in a hosting contest named VJs em Teste (VJs in evaluation). On MTV's Brazilian affiliate she hosted Disk MTV, Top 20 Brasil, Sobe Som, and regularly appeared on VJs em Ação.

In January 2006, she appeared on the cover of Brazilian magazine Revista MTV in a photograph inspired by Gisele Bündchen's cover on a special edition of British magazine The Face.
