= Alto da Boa Vista =

- Neighborhood
- Location in Rio de Janeiro Alto da Boa Vista (Brazil)
- Coordinates: 22°57′32″S 43°15′11″W
- Country: Brazil
- State: Rio de Janeiro (RJ)
- Municipality/City: Rio de Janeiro
- Zone: North Zone

Alto da Boa Vista is a neighborhood in the North Zone of Rio de Janeiro, Brazil.

== Geography ==
=== Climate ===
Climate data for Rio de Janeiro (station of Alto da Boa Vista, 1981—2010). Elevation: 300 m (984 ft).
Month	Jan	Feb	Mar	Apr	May	Jun	Jul	Aug	Sep	Oct	Nov	Dec	Year
Record high °C (°F)	37.5 (99.5)	36.5 (97.7)	36.8 (98.2)	34.8 (94.6)	33.0 (91.4)	32.9 (91.2)	32.7 (90.9)	38.5 (101.3)	37.5 (99.5)	38.5 (101.3)	37.1 (98.8)	38.5 (101.3)	38.5 (101.3)
Mean daily maximum °C (°F)	30.1 (86.2)	30.6 (87.1)	29.1 (84.4)	27.7 (81.9)	25.2 (77.4)	24.3 (75.7)	24.1 (75.4)	24.7 (76.5)	24.7 (76.5)	25.9 (78.6)	27.3 (81.1)	28.7 (83.7)	26.9 (80.4)
Mean daily minimum °C (°F)	20.7 (69.3)	20.9 (69.6)	20.2 (68.4)	18.8 (65.8)	16.8 (62.2)	15.3 (59.5)	14.8 (58.6)	15.3 (59.5)	16.1 (61.0)	17.3 (63.1)	18.6 (65.5)	19.8 (67.6)	17.9 (64.2)
Record low °C (°F)	12.0 (53.6)	15.2 (59.4)	14.5 (58.1)	11.5 (52.7)	10.2 (50.4)	6.7 (44.1)	7.3 (45.1)	8.7 (47.7)	8.1 (46.6)	10.5 (50.9)	11.4 (52.5)	10.2 (50.4)	6.7 (44.1)
Average precipitation mm (inches)	209.1 (8.23)	174.8 (6.88)	215.7 (8.49)	203.3 (8.00)	188.5 (7.42)	132.7 (5.22)	182.3 (7.18)	141.9 (5.59)	223.0 (8.78)	203.7 (8.02)	217.0 (8.54)	273.8 (10.78)	2,365.8 (93.14)
Average precipitation days (≥ 1.0 mm)	11	8	11	9	10	7	8	9	12	12	12	13	122
Source: (climatic average of 1981-2010; temperature records: 06/01/1966-present)
