= Canavial de Paixões =

- Genre: Telenovela; Romance; Drama
- Created by: Caridad Bravo Adams
- Based on: Cañaveral de Pasiones by Caridad Bravo Adams
- Written by: Juan Carlos Acalá
- Directed by: David Grimberg
- Starring: Bianca Castanho; Gustavo Haddad; Débora Duarte; Helena Fernandes; Jandir Ferrari; Oscar Magrini; Thierry Figueira; Ana Cecília Costa
- Opening theme: "Incêndio no Canavial", by Moacyr Franco
- Ending theme: "Incêndio no Canavial", by Moacyr Franco
- Country of origin: Brazil
- Original language: Portuguese
- No. of episodes: 116

Production
- Executive producer: Angelli Nesma Medina
- Production locations: São Bento dos Canaviais; Brazil
- Running time: 41-44 minutes
- Production company: SBT

Original release
- Network: SBT
- Release: 13 October 2003 – 22 March 2004

Related
- Cañaveral de Pasiones (original series)

Canavial de Paixões (Sugarcane Field of Passions) is a Brazilian telenovela produced and shown by the Sistema Brasileiro de Televisão from 13 October 2003 through 22 March 2004. Based the original text of Caridad Bravo Adams, it was translated into Portuguese for Enrique Zambelli and Simoni Boer, with supervision of text of Ecila Pedroso and general direction of teledramaturgia of David Grimberg. It had 118 chapters.

Bianca Castanho and Gustavo Haddad are the main protagonists. Débora Duarte, Helena Fernandes, Oscar Magrini are the main antagonists.

== Cast ==
Actor/Actress	Character
Bianca Castanho	Clara Santos Feberman Giácomo
Gustavo Haddad	Paulo Giácomo
Débora Duarte	Teresa Giácomo
Helena Fernandes	Raquel Feberman
Jandir Ferrari	Fausto Santos
Ana Cecília Costa	Mirela Mello de Giacomo
Thierry Figueira	João de Deus Giácomo
Oscar Magrini	Agenor Mello
Jonas Mello	Padre Antônio
Wanda Stefânia	Remédios Mello
Victor Fasano	Amador Giácomo
Cláudia Ohana	Débora Feberman de Santos
Patrícia Mayo	Amália Castro
Bruna Thedy	Regina de Almeida
Sidney Sampaio	Guilherme de Almeida
Patrícia Naves	"Marga" Margareth
Marcelo Médici	Osvaldo Dias
Analu Graci	Hilda Belay
Gustavo Wabner	Márcio Belay
Hélio Cícero	Carlos de Almeida
Walter Cruz	Dr. Alexandre Belay
Rosana Penna	Carlota
Déo Garcez	Vicente
Débora Gomez	Denise Belay
Karina Dohme	Clarice
Theresa Athayde	Maria
José Steinberg	Miguel Castro
Milton Levy	Fábio
Paula Cohen	Lourdes
Vinícius Vommaro	Zé Manuel
Dionísio Corrêa	Luis
Wagner Molina	Eugênio
Rogério Garcia	Abílio
Camilo Namour	Luciano
Rayana Vidal	Clara Feberman Santos (Child)
Giovanni Delgado	Paulo Giácomo (Child)
Giovanni Former	João de Deus (Child)
Bruna Guasco	Mirela (Child)
Fyama Monteiro	Rosinha

== Ibope ==
It had a good performance in the Ibope, with increasing indices of hearing:

- the 13 of October 13 of November - 13 points
- the 14 of November 14 of December - 16 points *
- the 15 of December 15 of January - 9 points
- the 16 of January 16 of February - 20 points
- the 17 of February 22 of March - 17 points

Its general average was of 15 points

== Version ==
- In 1996 he performed the original version, Cañaveral de pasiones, soap opera's original Caridad Bravo Adams produced by Humberto Zurita and Christian Bach, starring Daniela Castro, Juan Soler and Francisco Gattorno.
- In 2012 he performed the new version, Abismo de pasión is a Mexican telenovela executive producer for Angelli Nesma Medina and written by Caridad Bravo Adams, a remake since 1996. Angelique Boyer and David Zepeda are the main protagonists. Blanca Guerra, Mark Tacher, Altair Jarabo and Sabine Moussier are the main antagonists.
