= Andréa Maltarolli =

Brazilian screenwriter (1962–2009)

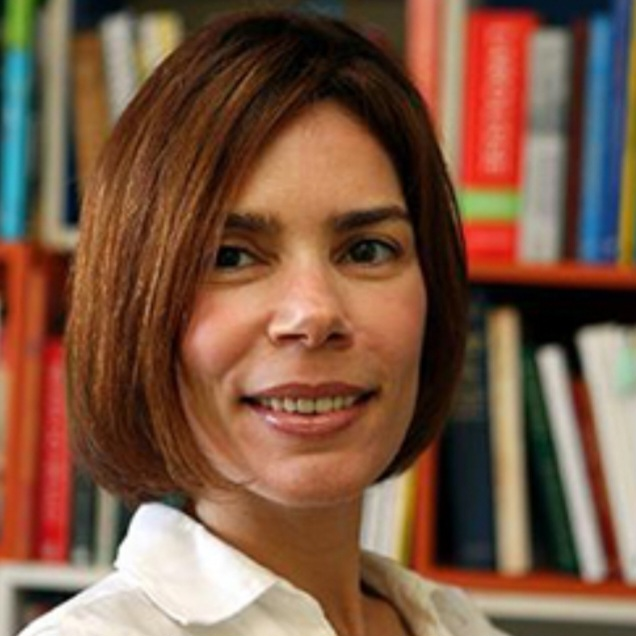
Image of Andréa Maltarolli

Andréa Maltarolli (28 September 1962 in Rio de Janeiro – 22 September 2009 in Rio de Janeiro) was a Brazilian soap opera and telenovela screenwriter.

== Biography ==
A graduate in history and media, Andrea Maltarolli joined TV station Rede Globo in 1995, and became involved with the fledgling soap opera Malhação. Aimed at the teenage market, the show became a great success and is still running as of 2009; Andrea Maltarolli continued to work on the program team until 2002. Following this, she then collaborated on other popular shows, and developed her first solo venture, telenovela Beleza Pura, broadcast in Brazil in 179 episodes between February and September 2008. From end of 2008 to mid-2009, she adapted for the theatre the comics "Mulheres Alteradas" created by Maitena Burundarena, an Argentine cartoonist. At the time of her death, she was working on the plot of a new series, provisionally titled As Quatro Estações. She wrote the synopsis of the telenovela named Alto Astral which was broadcast by TV Globo.

== Death ==
Maltarolli died of breast cancer on 22 September 2009, aged 46.

== Selected works ==
=== Screenwriter ===
- Malhação
- Zorra Total
- A Turma do Didi
- Escolinha do Professor Raimundo
- Beleza Pura
- Alto Astral

=== Theatre ===
- Mulheres Alteradas
