= Chega Mais =

- Genre: Telenovela
- Created by: Carlos Eduardo Novaes
- Starring: Tony Ramos; Sônia Braga; Renata Sorrah; Osmar Prado; Rosamaria Murtinho
- Opening theme: "Chega Mais" by Rita Lee
- Country of origin: Brazil
- Original language: Portuguese

Production
- Camera setup: Multi-camera
- Running time: 158

Original release
- Network: TV Globo
- Release: March 3 – September 5, 1980

Related
- Marron Glacê; Plumas e Paetês

Chega Mais is a Brazilian telenovela that premiered on 3 March 1980 replacing Marron Glacê at the traditional 7 pm timeslot. It is created by Carlos Eduardo Novaes, and directed by Gonzaga Blota, Walter Campos, Roberto Vignati and Reynaldo Boury.

== Plot ==
Set in Rio de Janeiro, it tells the story of Tom (Tony Ramos) and Gelly (Sônia Braga), who fight all the time, even though one can't live without the other. Their relationship becomes even more complicated when Tom is kidnapped on the day of his wedding to Gelly, leaving her distressed at the altar. He actually planned the kidnapping so that Gelly's family would pay the ransom. But what Tom didn't know is that her family is bankrupt.

Tom is an independent, irreverent and playful young man who doesn't think life is worth taking seriously. He lives with his father, Gilberto Barata (Gilberto Martinho), a retired civil servant who lives at home in his pajamas, looking after his pets, with whom he talks during the day. Barata has a difficult relationship with his son, because he behaves in a totally different way to what he had projected: a proper man, with a steady job and a family. There's also Wilma (Nádia Lippi), Tom's humble, shy and romantic sister, who works and studies, as well as looking after the house and her father, by whom she is subjugated. Romeu (Augusto Olímpio), Tom's childhood friend, frequents the Barata house and is a shy and fearful miner who is always criticizing his friend's behaviour but, deep down, envies him, as well as being secretly in love with Wilma; and Cupim (Tony Vermont), Tom's trickster friend who helps him in his adventures.

Gelly, on the other hand, is a beautiful, clumsy and selfish woman. She criticizes her family of decadent aristocrats, who live for appearances, and lives in a mansion with many valuable objects, sold when she needs money. She is always courted by many boys but, despite the mismatches, it is Tom she falls in love with. Her family is made up of Belmiro Maia (Cláudio Corrêa e Castro), her father, a biology professor and entomologist who, absent-minded and with an air of superiority, struggles to create something in the industry that will make him rich; her mother, Agda (Renata Fronzi), a snobbish woman who doesn't shy away from high social circles, loves to play games, read horoscopes and look for rich parties for her children; his brother, Tatá (Daniel Dantas), who claims to be studying Diplomacy, his mother's greatest dream, but is actually lazy and superstitious, doing everything he can to win the sports lottery; his grandmother, Cândida (Henriqueta Brieba), Belmiro's mother, an old lady who never loses the joy of life and exerts a strong influence on the decisions made by the family; and Lili (Elza Gomes), Agda's aunt, who lives in a wheelchair and has become deaf with age. Despite this, she is always trying to talk, but nobody pays much attention to her. Her great companion is her butler, Jaime (Brandão Filho), with whom she sometimes goes for walks. As for the employees, the family keeps the cultured and good-natured Jaime, who has some savings and is the one everyone turns to when they need money; and the gossipy housemaid Jacira (Sônia de Paula), who studies at night and almost always claims her labor rights, without success.

After their failed marriage, Gelly and Tom separate and embark on other relationships. Tom gets involved with businesswoman Léa Fonseca (Rosamaria Murtinho), an older woman who, as a widow, with a firm hand and the help of her mother, the wise and caring Vitória (Estelita Bell), took over her husband's business and raised their three children: Norma (Maria Cristina Nunes), the youngest, a determined girl who is studying journalism and dating Tito (Antonio Pedro), a serious and distinguished journalist who is older than her, but is in love with Tatá; Cristina (Christiane Torloni), her mother's right-hand woman, a futile girl who is in a complicated marriage with Roberto (Reynaldo Gonzaga), an ambitious and fun man who has a degree in business and economics and makes no effort to get ahead in life; and the methodical Guto (Ney Santanna), the eldest, who sees himself as the head of the family after his father's death and, for this reason, keeps meddling in the lives of his mother and sisters, as well as appearing to be what he is not: stern and rude. Gelly's ex-boyfriend, he starts harassing her when she breaks up with Tom and gets angry when he finds out she's involved with his mother. However, Guto arouses Wilma's interest, without knowing that she is his rival's sister.

At a certain point in the plot, another character who also invests in Tom is Rosa (Thaís de Andrade), his ex-girlfriend. Affable, Rosa returns to Brazil after recovering from a tumor and is ready to win Tom back. However, disillusioned by his lack of interest in her and his love for Gelly, she decides to return to Europe but falls in love with Hercules (Roberto Bomfim), a smart-ass detective who, brought up in the suburbs by his aunt, the flamboyant Leda (Agnes Fontoura), is dazzled by the higher social status of the wealthy Rosa and Patrícia (Dulce Conforto).

While Gelly doesn't give in to Guto's advances, her mother, Agda, does everything she can to make her daughter fall in love with American diplomat Paul Cleveland (Ruy Rezende). She doesn't know, however, that Paul Cleveland is Zico Souza, a friendly and funny street vendor who works and lives in the suburbs of Rio de Janeiro with his mother, the trickster fortune teller Zoraide (Ana Ariel), and his father, Souza (Paulo Gonçalves), a simple taxi driver. Zico's best friend and fellow hustler is the provocative Bárbara (Joséphine Hélene), also a street vendor. Gelly discovers her mother's deception and, to punish her, enlists the help of Zico himself - who becomes her friend - to keep up the charade. Zico, for his part, awakens passion in Jacira, and the two start dating in secret.

Tom and Gelly's encounters were interspersed with the story of Lúcia (Renata Sorrah). A strong and independent journalist, she suffers from her husband's abandonment and raises her son André (Égon Aszmann) with dedication.[9] Lúcia is in constant conflict with her father, Mr. Felipe Gomes (Felipe Carone), a musical instrument exporter who is intransigent. Felipe Gomes (Felipe Carone), an exporter of musical instruments, who intransigently insists that she take over the family business; however, she gets on very well with her mother, the understanding Carmem (Heloísa Helena), an activist in the animal rights movement, and her younger sister, the ditzy Patrícia, who, like her father, only thinks about money and loves to enjoy the pleasures it brings. That's why she does ballet, gymnastics, jazz and goes clubbing with her friend Norma.

Lúcia works at the publishing house of a well-known magazine, where Tito, Norma, Tomás (José Augusto Branco), one of the directors, who was her former boyfriend and, an old-fashioned conqueror but in reality a canast, is always courting her; and the stunning and sensible Brigitte (Ilka Soares), her boss, in love with Tomás and Léa's best friend.

Lúcia's life changes completely when she meets and falls in love with Amaro (Osmar Prado), a Bahian who comes to Rio de Janeiro to try his hand as a singer, forming an unusual and unlikely couple with him. Amaro is the son of Valda (Gracinda Freire), a determined and controlling woman who worries about him all the time, and the nephew of the thoughtful farmer Tião (Luiz Orioni), who supports him and keeps him in Rio, as well as trying unsuccessfully to reassure his mother. After a lot of effort and perseverance, Amaro ends up launching his musical career as the popular singer Ted Lover.

== Cast ==
Actor	Character
Tony Ramos	Antônio Barata (Tom)
Sônia Braga	Gelly Maia
Renata Sorrah	Lúcia Gomes
Osmar Prado	Amaro / Ted Lover
Rosamaria Murtinho	Léa Fonseca
Cláudio Corrêa e Castro	Belmiro Maia
Renata Fronzi	Agda Maia
Ruy Rezende	Zico Souza / Paul Cleveland
Ney Santanna	Augusto Fonseca (Guto)
Nádia Lippi	Wilma Barata
Roberto Bonfim	Hércules
Thaís de Andrade	Rosa
Gilberto Martinho	Seu Gilberto Barata
Ana Ariel	Zoraide Souza
Paulo Gonçalves	Seu Souza
Maria Cristina Nunes	Norma Fonseca
Daniel Dantas	Tadeu Maia (Tatá)
Dulce Conforto	Patrícia Gomes
Christiane Torloni	Cristina Fonseca
Reinaldo Gonzaga	Roberto
Antônio Pedro	Tito
Elza Gomes	Lília Maia (Tia Lili)
Felipe Carone	Sr. Felipe Gomes
Heloísa Helena	Carmem Gomes
José Augusto Branco	Tomás
Ilka Soares	Brigitte
Henriqueta Brieba	Cândida Maia
Brandão Filho	Jaime
Sônia de Paula	Jacira
Augusto Olímpio	Romeu
Joséphine Hélene	Bárbara
Tony Vermont	Cupim
Agnes Fontoura	Leda
Gracinda Freire	Valda
Luiz Orioni	Tião
Estelita Bell	Vitória Fonseca
Rosi Campos	Aline
Tião D'Ávila	Oswaldo
Égon Aszmann	André Gomes (Andrezinho)

=== Special appearances ===
Ator	Personagem
Alice Viveiros	Edna
Armando Bógus	Nestor
Edgard Franco	Pablo Herrera
Érica Kupper	Myrian
Fernando José	Tubarão
Flávio Migliaccio	
Gilda Sarmento	Dona Conceição
Neila Tavares	Dominique Airosa Cerqueira
Gugu Olimecha	Tarzã (Tom's friend)
João Carlos Barroso	Luís César
José Mayer	Reporter
Laerte Morrone	Waldomiro
Lima Duarte	Oscar
Maria Cristina Gatti	Lourdes
Mário Gomes	Eliezer
Milton Gonçalves
Ney Latorraca	Jonas
Ruthinéa de Moraes	Cacilda
Sílvia Salgado	Virgínia
Terezinha Moreira	Berta
Yara Cortes	Madame Clô

== Production ==
The title of the soap opera would be Tom and Gelly, since Carlos Eduardo Novaes was inspired by the story of Tom and Jerry to make up the main couple who lived in a cat and mouse fight until the end of the plot, and the opening theme would be the song Corre Corre from Rita Lee's new album. Due to the high cost of the rights to the title, which belonged to the Hanna-Barbera company, the title was changed to Chega Mais, which was the name of another song chosen for the opening theme, taken from the same Rita Lee album.

It is the only Brazilian telenovela to win Italian TV's biggest award, the Telegatto.

== Connection with Marron Glacê ==
It is revealed in the first chapter of Chega Mais that this telenovela takes place in the same universe as its predecessor at 7 pm timeslot on Rede Globo, Marron Glacê: the buffet hired for the wedding of Antônio "Tom" Barata and Gelly Maia is the same buffet which was the main scenario that bears the name of the previous soap opera, "Marron Glacê" and in which four of the characters who were members of this buffet appeared in the first chapter of Chega Mais: the protagonist of Marron Glacê and the owner of the buffet, Clotilde or Madame Clô (Yara Cortes) and three of her most important and loyal employees, Oscar (Lima Duarte), the oldest waiter at Marron Glace and trusted man to Madame Clô; Luís César (João Carlos Barroso), a waiter infamously known for being a playboy-style flirt who also works as a boom operator in his spare time and Valdomiro (Laerte Morrone), a maitre d' who is notoriously known for being the toughest, sternest and most feared employee in the entire buffet.
