= Marcelo Ribeiro =

Marcelo Ribeiro may refer to:

- Marcelo Ribeiro (actor) (born 1970), Brazilian actor
- Marcelo Ribeiro (footballer) (born 1997), Brazilian football player
