= Marron Glacê =

- Genre: Telenovela; Romance comedy
- Created by: Cassiano Gabus Mendes
- Opening theme: " Marron Glacé" – Ronaldo Resedá
- Country of origin: Brazil
- Original language: Portuguese
- No. of episodes: 181

Production
- Running time: 40 minutes

Original release
- Network: TV Globo
- Release: 6 August 1979 – 29 February 1980

Related
- Feijão Maravilha; Chega Mais

Marron Glacê is a Brazilian telenovela produced and broadcast by TV Globo. It premiered on 6 August 1979 and ended on 29 February 1980, with a total of 181 episodes. It's the twenty fourth "novela das sete" to be aired at the timeslot. It is created by Cassiano Gabus Mendes.

== Cast ==
Actor	Character
Yara Cortes	Clotilde (Madame Clô)
Paulo Figueiredo	Otávio
Sura Berditchevsky	Vanessa
Lima Duarte	Oscar
Tereza Rachel	Lola
Ana Lúcia Torre	Stela
Armando Bógus	Nestor
Louise Cardoso	Vânia
Laerte Morrone	Valdomiro
Nestor de Montemar	Pierre Lafond / Joaquim
Ema D'Ávila	Dona Beatriz (Dona Beá)
Dirce Migliaccio	Dona Angelina
Jorge Botelho	Fábio Carlos
Mila Moreira	Érica
Maria Alves	Dayse (Bizuca)
João Carlos Barroso	Luís César
Heloísa Millet	Zina
Denise Dumont	Andreia
Ricardo Blat	Juliano
Myrian Rios	Shirley
Ary Fontoura	Ernani
Lady Francisco	Eleonora
Rosita Thomaz Lopes	Leila
Roberto Faissal	Cícero
Mário Gomes	Eliézer
Chica Xavier	Filomena (Filó)
Angelito Mello	Nicolas
Isolda Cresta	Arlene
Carlos Wilson	Dirceu
Vera Manhães	Lizete
