= Love Strange Love =

1982 film by Walter Hugo Khouri

- Theatrical release poster
- Directed by: Walter Hugo Khouri
- Written by: Walter Hugo Khouri
- Produced by: Anibal Massaini Neto
- Starring: Vera Fischer; Marcelo Ribeiro; Tarcísio Meira; Xuxa Meneghel
- Cinematography: Antonio Meliande
- Edited by: Eder Mazzini
- Music by: Rogério Duprat
- Production company: Cinearte
- Distributed by: Embrafilme
- Release date: November 1, 1982
- Running time: 110 minutes
- Country: Brazil
- Language: Portuguese

Love Strange Love (Portuguese: Amor Estranho Amor) is a 1982 Brazilian erotic crime drama film written and directed by Walter Hugo Khouri. The film stars Vera Fischer, Tarcísio Meira, Xuxa Meneghel, and Matilde Mastrangi. Fischer won the Best Actress Award at the 15th Festival de Brasília as well as the Air France Award.

== Plot ==
An older man wearing a business suit is dropped off at a mansion by his driver. He wanders through the rooms of an apparently abandoned and empty mansion. The scene flashbacks to near the mansion 45 years earlier, where a twelve year old boy is being escorted on foot from a train station by his grandmother. The older woman produces a letter and asks the boy to give it to his mother. The grandmother leaves the boy where a woman greets him at the gate. He gives her the letter for his mother, and she escorts him into the house.

After they enter the house, another woman serving as a business manager greets them. After being told about the letter for Anna, the boy's mother, the manager dispatches the first woman to find Anna. Meanwhile, many women in the house are hard at work preparing for what appears to be an important upcoming event. As the boy is escorted to a side room, he tells her to her apparent shock that his grandmother left him there to stay with his mother. Anna appears and embraces her son, noting she last saw him a year ago.

Anna discusses the letter with the manager. In the letter, the grandmother—Anna's mother—complains that Anna generally provides full support for the Santa Catarina household, and Anna's mother is angry that no money has been forthcoming for the last few months. The mansion is a brothel owned by a Dr. Osmar, serving Dr. Osmar and other wealthy men.

As the activities in the house are illegal, it is dangerous to allow a twelve year old boy to stay there, but Anna has no local family to send him to. They can return the boy—with some money—to Santa Catarina, but need a plan for what to do until after the upcoming event. The manager—now referred to as the brothel's madam—summons a woman named Therese and instructs her to create a makeshift bedroom for the boy in the attic. Anna takes the boy to her room. The boy is too innocent to fully understand at first.

In the attic, Anna promises that eventually they will have their own house together, but that he might have to return to his grandmother for a short time. Someone arrives and Anna leaves. Shortly after, the boy observes the women preparing for customers.

Anna and Laura then talk on the patio with Dr. Osmar, who is a major political figure preparing for the Brazilian election. Osmar has invited a potential ally to the brothel with the hope of putting him in a compromising situation.

Anna and Dr. Osmar then have sex for an extended period while Hugo watches—from the attic Hugo is able to spy on activities in a number of rooms in the house. Witnessing Anna having sex, Hugo realizes the true nature of the house and his mother's line of work, and starts crying. Dr. Osmar appears to be a would-be leader of a Brazilian government that would ally with the Axis if given the chance.

Olga, who has previously shown interest in Hugo, arrives in the attic, complaining that all the men who patronize the brothel are slimy characters and implying she wants the chance to have sex with someone more wholesome like Hugo. She unbuttons Hugo's shirt and pants and caresses his body for a bit before she undresses and invites Hugo to fondle her breasts, which he does. They are interrupted when another woman approaches and starts crying, for unknown reason. Olga eventually leaves.

The planned event begins that evening, with a live band providing entertainment. A group of well dressed men, led by a Dr. Benicio, arrives at the party. When a newly arrived prostitute, Tamara, is presented to him as a sort of gift, Dr. Benicio becomes suspicious that the situation might be some sort of trap and begins to question what is going on.

Hugo spies on Tamara and then on Anna, who is becoming aroused. Hugo returns to his attic and goes to bed, dreaming of sex with first one woman and then a group of about six women. He starts to masturbate while in bed to these images.

The next morning an associate of Dr. Osmar arrives at the house and angrily demands to speak with Dr. Osmar. Once Dr. Osmar is roused from sleep, he is told that some kind of coup has happened. Dr. Osmar tells Anna that the coup will likely lead to his needing to go to France in exile. He writes Anna a check and says they will talk more in the afternoon. Dr. Osmar, Dr. Benicio and the men who work for them leave the house in a hurry.

Anna tells Hugo that he will need to return to his grandmother, although Anna will send her mother more money. Anna says that staying in the brothel wouldn't be good for Hugo, but he has trouble understanding and starts to cry. Anna tries to comfort him; she removes her robe, allowing Hugo to caress her body, and then makes love with him.

A political figure, apparently newly empowered by the coup, arrives at the house and somewhat vaguely promises to continue to protect the brothel from the law. The scene shifts back to the present day, where it is revealed that the older man in the house is donating the house to charity. He seems to be a very senior political figure being referred to as “Your Excellency”. In the film's final scene, the older man reveals that the young boy is his younger self from 45 years earlier.

== Cast ==
- Vera Fischer as Anna
- Tarcísio Meira as Dr. Osmar
- Xuxa Meneghel as Tamara
- Matilde Mastrangi as Olga
- Íris Bruzzi as Laura
- Walter Forster as Hugo (Adult)
- Marcelo Ribeiro as Hugo (Child)
- Mauro Mendonça as Dr. Benicio

== Production ==
Marcelo Ribeiro said that, unlike his first movie Eros, o Deus do Amor, when they put duct tape on his privates because he couldn't control himself, in this film's sex scenes he had a normal nude. "I learned to separate what was work and what was intimate. But of course there's always a little joke, an awkward situation... The film set is very mystical, you never know what might happen", he said.

Vera Fischer revealed that she had initially refused to do the love scene with Marcelo Ribeiro. It was the director himself who convinced her that the scene was essential: "Walter Hugo already likes these things. If he had a female child, I don't know...The scene turned out beautifully, the little boy wasn't even intimidated," she said.

== Reception ==
In the criticism of the website Filmes do Chico, it is stated that "because it was associated with Xuxa as a pedophile, the film gained a fame that does not correspond to the material it offers. Like all of Khouri's films, Amor, Estranho Amor has many sex scenes, a lot of free nudity, but, putting the drops on the is, it's a good movie."

== Controversy ==
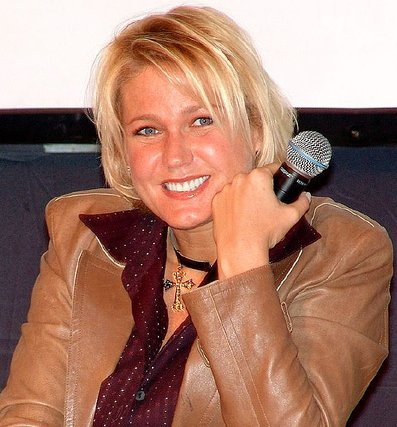
The film caused controversy because it contained the participation of the children's presenter Xuxa.

Love Strange Love caused some controversy due to the participation of Xuxa in the cast. In an interview, Xuxa explained that she was between 17 and 19 years old when the film was made. In another interview Xuxa comments that the film was made in 1979. Her character has sexual relations with a boy of 12 years played by the actor Marcelo Ribeiro. In 1987, Xuxa obtained a judicial injunction to have copies of the video removed from circulation; nevertheless 4,000 copies has already been sold before the judgement, and it was reported the videos stores continued to rent out copies.

The video of Love Strange Love has its marketing and distribution prohibited in the country. However, the film was released on DVD in the United States in 2005 and can be purchased by any Brazilian on foreign import sites. The US producer did not sell the rights to Xuxa, who filed a lawsuit in the US in 1993 but lost.

In 2006, Marcelo Ribeiro was found at 39 and gave several interviews, and also published a book on how everything happened at the time, including conversations behind the scenes with the actress. In 2007, Marcelo Ribeiro, then at age 40, gave an interview where he comments on the film's controversy. Taking advantage of his momentary popularity, he made a pornographic film the same year.

In 2007, the entire film became available in 5 parts and uncut. No legal action has yet been taken on the case. In 2011, producer Anibal Massaine fights in justice in the attempt to commercialize the film, taking advantage of the fame of the artist. In 2014, Xuxa lost a lawsuit it filed against Google to create a filter in order to eliminate results related to the movie in its search engine. Xuxa filed an appeal against that decision, but in 2017, the appeal was denied.

== Awards ==
Awards
Year	Award	Category	Recipients and nominees	Result
1982	Candango Trophy	Best Actress	Vera Fischer	Won
1982	Air France	Best Actress	Vera Fischer	Won
