= Direito de Amar =

- Genre: Telenovela; Drama
- Created by: Walter Negrão
- Directed by: Reynaldo Boury; Jayme Monjardim; José Carlos Pieri
- Starring: Glória Pires; Lauro Corona; Carlos Vereza; Ítala Nandi; Cissa Guimarães; Ester Góes see more
- Opening theme: Iluminados by Ivan Lins
- Country of origin: Brazil
- Original language: Portuguese
- No. of episodes: 172

Production
- Production location: Brazil
- Running time: 50 minutes (approx.)

Original release
- Network: TV Globo
- Release: 16 February – 4 September 1987

Related
- Sinhá Moça; Bambolê

Direito de Amar is a Brazilian telenovela produced and broadcast by TV Globo in 1987.

== Cast ==
| Actor/Actress | Character |
|---|---|
| Glória Pires | Rosália Alves Medeiros |
| Lauro Corona | Adriano Monserrat |
| Carlos Vereza | Francisco de Monserrat |
| Ítala Nandi | Joana / Bárbara / Nanette |
| Carlos Zara | Dr. Jorge Ramos |
| Cissa Guimarães | Paula Alves Barbosa |
| Ednei Giovenazzi | Augusto Medeiros |
| Ester Góes | Leonor Alves Medeiros |
| Betty Gofman | Tonica |
| Suzana Faini | Mercedes |
| Elias Gleizer | Manel Barbosa |
| Célia Helena | Berenice Reis (Berê) |
| Rogério Márcico | Raimundo Reis |
| Yolanda Cardoso | Catarina Alves Barbosa |
| Cristina Prochaska | Carola |
| Older Cazarré | Padre Inácio |
| Priscila Camargo | Alice |
| Rômulo Arantes | Nelo |
| João Carlos Barroso | Danilo |
| Rosana Garcia | Marizé |
| Roberto Faissal | Padre Galileu |
| Narjara Turetta | Mariana |
| Luísa Thiré | Marinês |
| Tim Rescala | Bodoque (Teotônio Andrade da Silva) |
| Cinira Camargo | Esmeralda |
| Carlo Briani | Rogério Reis |
| Luca de Castro | Juca |
| Stella Miranda | Mignon |
| Felipe Donavan | Tufi |
| Teresa Cristina Arnaud | Ondina |

=== Special participations ===
| Actor | Character |
|---|---|
| Carlos Gregório | Cirineu Farfan |
| Francisco Milani | Veiga |
