= The Lady from the Shanghai Cinema =

1988 film directed by Guilherme de Almeida Prado

- Cover of the VHS release
- Directed by: Guilherme de Almeida Prado
- Written by: Guilherme de Almeida Prado
- Produced by: Sara Silveira
- Starring: Maitê Proença; Antônio Fagundes
- Cinematography: Cláudio Portioli; José Roberto Eliezer
- Edited by: Jair Garcia Duarte
- Music by: Hermelino Neder
- Production companies: Embrafilme; Star Filmes; Raiz
- Distributed by: Embrafilme (theatrical); CIC Video (home video)
- Release date: September 1, 1988
- Running time: 115 minutes
- Country: Brazil
- Language: Portuguese
- Budget: $450,000

The Lady from the Shanghai Cinema (Portuguese: A Dama do Cine Shanghai) is a 1988 Brazilian thriller film written and directed by Guilherme de Almeida Prado. The film borrows some references from Hollywood films noirs of the 1940s, mainly Orson Welles' The Lady from Shanghai; its name is a play on the title of Welles's film.

== Plot ==
Lucas (Antônio Fagundes), an estate agent, becomes fascinated by Suzana (Maitê Proença), a woman who looks almost exactly like an actress in the film he is watching. They start an affair, but she is married to Desdino, a gangster (Paulo Villaça), exposing Lucas to a criminal world of violence and corruption.

== Cast ==
- Maitê Proença as Suzana
- Antônio Fagundes as Lucas
- Paulo Villaça as Desdino
- José Mayer as Bolívar
- José Lewgoy as Linus
- Miguel Falabella as Lana
- Jorge Dória as an old man
- Sérgio Mamberti as Stan
- Matilde Mastrangi as secretary
- Imara Reis as Carmem / Sabrina / Lila Van / Inês Helena
- John Doo as Chuang
- Júlio Calasso as Bira

== Reception ==
At the 16th Festival de Gramado, it was elected the Best Film by the jury and critics, receiving also Best Director, Best Cinematography, Best Original Score, Best Scenography, and Best Editing awards. The Lady From the Shanghai Cinema won the Best Film, Best Cinematography, Best Score, and Best Art Director at the 6th Bogota Film Festival.
