= A Viagem =

- Created by: Ivani Ribeiro
- Written by: Solange Castro Neves
- Directed by: Wolf Maya
- Starring: Christiane Torloni; Antônio Fagundes; Guilherme Fontes; Maurício Mattar; Andréa Beltrão; Cláudio Cavalcanti; Lucinha Lins; Jonas Bloch; Fernanda Rodrigues; Miguel Falabella; Thaís de Campos; Laura Cardoso; Yara Cortes; Ary Fontoura; Nair Bello
- Theme music composer: Cleberson Horsth; Aldir Blanc
- Opening theme: "A Viagem" by Roupa Nova
- Country of origin: Brazil
- Original language: Portuguese
- No. of episodes: 167

Original release
- Network: TV Globo
- Release: April 11 – October 22, 1994

A Viagem (The Journey) is a Brazilian telenovela produced by TV Globo. It was written by Ivani Ribeiro, with contributions from Solange Castro Neves, and directed by Wolf Maya, Ignácio Coqueiro, and André Schultz. The telenovela aired from April 11 to October 22, 1994, and consisted of 167 episodes.

It is a remake of the 1975–1976 telenovela of the same name, also written by Ivani Ribeiro. The plot explores the sorrows and hopes of ordinary people and their relationships of love and enmity. Supernatural forces influence the characters’ lives until peace and harmony are ultimately restored. The show's success contributed to an increase in sales of books on Spiritism.

== Synopsis ==
Alexandre Toledo commits a robbery during which he kills a man who catches him in the act. Although he manages to flee the scene, his brother Raul and brother-in-law Teodoro (Téo) report him to the police. Alexandre's sister, Diná—who is also Téo's wife—tries to defend him and seeks help from lawyer Otávio Jordão. However, Otávio refuses to assist her because the victim was his close friend. Alexandre is eventually sentenced to 18 years in prison. Before taking his own life, he vows to seek revenge on those who betrayed him "in this life or the next." After his suicide, Alexandre's spirit begins to haunt and torment Raul, Téo, and Otávio.

As a ghost, Alexandre manipulates Mrs. Guiomar, Raul's mother-in-law, who treats him like a son, turning Raul and Andrezza's lives into misery. Otávio's son, Tato, drops out of school and starts engaging in delinquent behaviour similar to Alexandre's, while Téo suffers from violent outbursts. Alexandre later causes Otávio's death in a car accident, leaving Diná devastated.

In another subplot, Téo—who is younger than his wife and known for his infidelity—struggles with Diná's jealousy. The two separate, and Téo becomes involved with Alexandre's former girlfriend, Lisandra (Lisa), whom he eventually marries.

After Alexandre's death, Dr. Alberto Rezende, a family friend, offers support to Alexandre's mother, Mrs. Maroca, and the rest of the family. Initially attracted to Diná, Alberto later falls in love with Estela, Diná's older sister, and they marry. As a medium and follower of Allan Kardec's Spiritist doctrine, Alberto is the only one who understands that Alexandre's spirit is responsible for the family's suffering. He attempts to guide Alexandre’s tormented soul toward redemption.

Meanwhile, Estela faces difficulties with her teenage daughter, Beatriz (Bia). Beatriz's father, Ismael Novaes, a wealthy drug dealer and illegal gambling promoter, had abandoned the family years earlier. When he reappears, his negative influence leads Beatriz to leave her mother and live with him. She begins a relationship with Tato, Otávio's son, but eventually discovers her father's criminal activities and runs away from home.

Diná desperately searches for Beatriz and manages to bring her back to Estela, but she suffers a fatal heart attack soon after. In the afterlife, her spirit joins Otávio's in an effort to redeem Alexandre's soul. In the final scenes, Alexandre, unable to endure his suffering in hell, repents and ascends to heaven, where he reincarnates as the son of Téo and Lisa. With Alexandre's vengeful spirit at peace, Tato reforms, Téo's violent fits cease, Mrs. Guiomar finds peace with her family, and Raul and Andrezza reconcile and have a child, restoring harmony to all.

== Production ==
=== Development ===
A Viagem is a remake of the telenovela of the same name written by Ivani Ribeiro and originally broadcast on Rede Tupi between 1975 and 1976. The story explores life after death according to Spiritist doctrine. Ribeiro drew inspiration from the books E a Vida Continua... (1968) and Nosso Lar (1944), both psychographed by the medium Chico Xavier.

The telenovela was initially planned for the 6 p.m. timeslot. However, due to production issues with Olho no Olho's 7 p.m. replacement, Vira Lata—which was postponed for future production—A Viagem was reassigned to the 7 p.m. slot. The late scheduling decision meant that director Wolf Maya began work on the production only twenty days before its premiere.

During the writing of the remake, Ivani Ribeiro experienced vision problems due to complications from diabetes. Her collaborator, Solange Castro Neves, read the original script and drafted the adaptations discussed with Ribeiro. A Viagem was Ribeiro's final telenovela before her death in 1995 at the age of 73 from kidney failure.

=== Casting ===
To portray the protagonist Diná, Wolf Maya first invited Regina Duarte, who had been absent from telenovelas since Rainha da Sucata. However, Duarte declined the role, and Christiane Torloni was later cast. At the time, Torloni was living in Portugal and agreed to participate after being told that the production was a comedy, which turned out not to be entirely accurate.

Cláudio Corrêa e Castro was the only actor to appear in both versions of the telenovela. In the 1975 version, he portrayed Daniel, the mentor from Nosso Lar, while in the 1994 remake he played Alexandre's defence lawyer.

A Viagem was also the first and only telenovela featuring actress and singer Chris Pitsch, who died in 1995 at the age of 24 from a heart attack.

== Cast ==
- Christiane Torloni as Diná Toledo Dias
- Antônio Fagundes as Otávio César Jordão
- Guilherme Fontes as Alexandre Toledo
- Andréa Beltrão as Lisandra "Lisa" Barbosa
- Maurício Mattar as Teodoro "Téo" Dias
- Lucinha Lins as Estela Toledo Novaes
- Miguel Falabella as Raul Toledo
- Thaís de Campos as Andrezza Muniz Toledo
- Suzy Rêgo as Carmem
- Jonas Bloch as Ismael Novaes
- Laura Cardoso as Guiomar Muniz
- Yara Cortes as Maroca Toledo
- Cláudio Cavalcanti as Dr. Alberto Rezende
- Nair Bello as Dona Cininha
- Ary Fontoura as Seu Tibério
- Eduardo Galvão as Mauro Botelho Rezende
- Fernanda Rodrigues as Beatriz "Bia" Toledo Novaes
- Felipe Martins as Otávio "Tato" César Jordão Júnior
- Lolita Rodrigues as Fátima Aparecida Domingues
- John Herbert as Agenor Barbosa
- Breno Moroni as Mascarado / Adonay
- Denise Del Vecchio as Glória Gusmão
- Mara Carvalho as Regina
- Irving São Paulo as José Carlos "Zeca" Barbosa
- Daniel Ávila as Eduardo "Dudu" Jordão
- Viviane Pinheiro as Patrícia "Patty" Toledo Dias
- Cláudio Mamberti as Geraldão
- Ricardo Petraglia as Diogo Queiroz
- Tânia Scher as Josefa Dias
- Mara Manzan as Edmeia
- Keila Bueno as Naná
- Renato Rabello as Padilha
- Eduardo Felipe as Dedé
- Roberta Índio do Brasil as Sofia
- Chris Pitsch as Bárbara
- Walther Verve as Boca
- Danton Mello as Johnny
- Solange Couto as Zulmira
- Gésio Amadeu as Julião
- Carlos Takeshi as Okida
- Maria Alves as Francisca
- Cibele Larrama as Maria
- Jorge Pontual as Antônio
- Nádia Bambirra as Margarida
