= José Mayer =

Brazilian actor (born 1949)

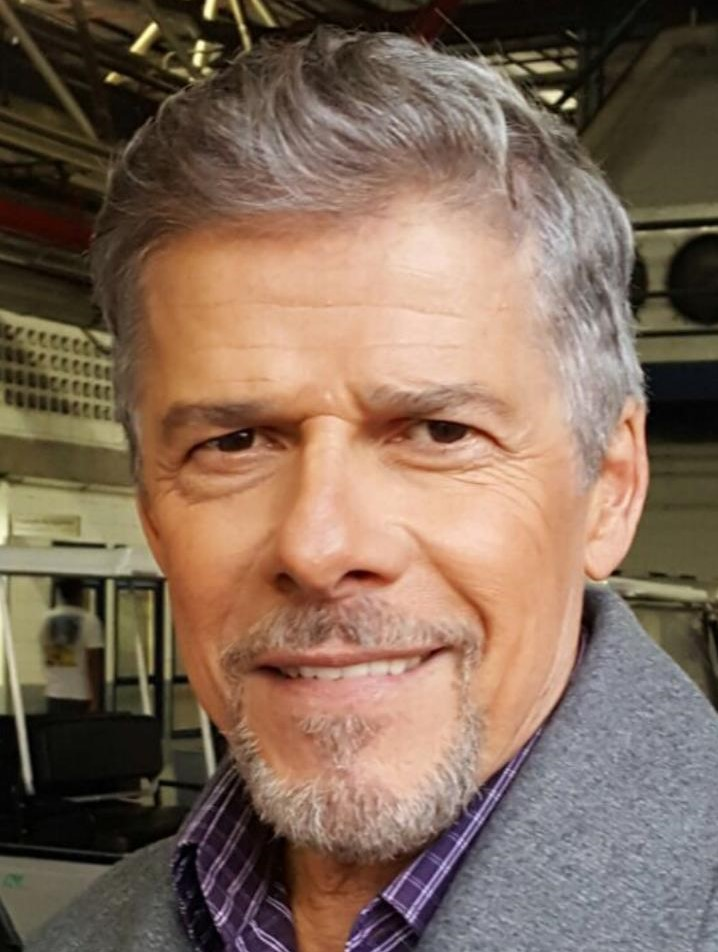
- Mayer in 2017
- Born: José Mayer Drummond Araújo; 3 October 1949 (age 76); São Domingos do Prata (now Jaguaraçu), Minas Gerais, Brazil
- Occupation: Actor
- Years active: 1963–2017
- Spouse: Vera Fajardo
- Children: 1

José Mayer Drummond Araújo (born 3 October 1949) is a Brazilian former actor.

== Biography and career ==
Mayer was born in Jaguaraçu, Minas Gerais, and made his debut on television in 1977 in a children's television series Sítio do Picapau Amarelo. Three years later, he was in the first season of Carga Pesada, in the episode "O Foragido". In 1983, for his performances in Bandidos da Falange and Guerra dos Sexos, he won the APCA Award for Best Newcomer Actor. He became notorious by his main role in the television adaptation of O Pagador de Promessas. Most known for his roles as a leading man in telenovelas, he also acted in several films, including Perfume de Gardênia, for which he won the Best Actor Award at the 25th Festival de Brasília.

== Sexually harassment incident ==
In April 2017, Mayer was suspended of working with TV Globo after the wardrobe artist Susllen Tomani accused the actor of having sexually harassed her. Tomani related the incident to the newspaper Folha de S.Paulo. Mayer denied the accusation.

== Filmography ==
=== Television ===
Year	Title	Role	Notes
1977–82	Sítio do Picapau Amarelo	Burro Falante (voice)	Seasons 1–6
1980	Carga Pesada	Driver	Episode: "O Foragido"
1980	Chega Mais	Reporter	Episode: "March 4th"
1980	Malu Mulher	Doctor	Episode: "Com Que Roupa?"
1982	Caso Verdade	Toni	Episode: "A Grande Promessa"
1983	Bandidos da Falange	Jorge Fernando	
1983	Guerra dos Sexos	Ulisses da Silva	
1984	Partido Alto	Claudionor dos Santos "Piscina"	
1985	A Gata Comeu	Edson	
1985	O Tempo e o Vento	Aderbal Mena	
1986	Selva de Pedra	Caio Vilhena	
1986	Hipertensão	Raul Galvão	
1988	O Pagador de Promessas	Zé do Burro	
1988	Fera Radical	Fernando Flores	
1989	Tieta	Osnar	
1990	Meu Bem, Meu Mal	Ricardo Miranda	
1992	De Corpo e Alma	Carlos Henrique "Caíque"	
1993	Agosto	Commissioner Alberto Matos	
1994	Pátria Minha	Pedro Fonseca	
1995	História de Amor	Carlos Alberto Moretti	
1996	A Vida Como Ela É...	Various characters	
1997	A Indomada	Teobaldo Faruk	
1998	Meu Bem Querer	Martinho Amoedo	
2000	Laços de Família	Pedro Marcondes Mendes	
2001	Presença de Anita	Fernando Reis	
2002	Esperança	Martino Rizzo	Episodes: "June 17–August 30"
2003	Mulheres Apaixonadas	Dr. César Andrade de Melo	
2004	Senhora do Destino	Dirceu de Castro	
2006	Páginas da Vida	Gregório "Greg" Rodrigues Lobo	
2008	A Favorita	Augusto César Rodrigues	
2009	Viver a Vida	Marcos Ribeiro	
2011	Fina Estampa	José Pereira "Pereirinha"	
2013	Saramandaia	Zico Rosado	
2014	Império	Cláudio Bolgari Nascimento	
2016	Tá no Ar: A TV na TV	Himself	
2016	A Lei do Amor	Sebastião "Tião" Bezerra	

=== Film ===
Year	Title	Role
2017	Encantados	Lawyer Angelino
2009	Divã	
2001	Bufo & Spallanzani	Ivan Canabrava
1994	Mil e Uma	Baron
1993	Capitalismo Selvagem	Hugo Victor Assis
1992	Perfume de Gardênia	Daniel
1991	Esta Não É a Sua Vida	Narrator
1987	The Lady from the Shanghai Cinema	Bolivar
1984	Nunca Fomos Tão Felizes	
1983	Idolatrada	Manuel
1978	O Bandido Antônio Dó	Cameo
1975	A Mulher do Desejo	Marcelo / Osmar
1975	Enigma para Demônios	Luiz
