= Matilde Mastrangi =

Brazilian actress (born 1953)

- Born: Matilde Raspa Mastrangi; March 18, 1953 (age 72); São Paulo, Brazil
- Occupation: Actress
- Years active: 1974 –
- Spouse: Oscar Magrini
- Children: Isabella Mastrangi Magrini

Matilde Raspa Mastrangi (born 18 March 1953 in São Paulo, Brazil) is a Brazilian actress.

== Career ==
Mastrangi was originally a photomodel who also posed for the magazine Sétimo Céu. In 1971, singer Wanderley Cardoso arranged her to work as a dancer on Silvio Santos TV show.

Mastrangi made her acting debut in 1974 with As Cangaceiras Eróticas, an erotic comedy by Roberto Mauro. She continued her acting career with films like Bacalhau (1976). She became a popular figure of pornochanchadas and during these years, she was considered as one of the most important actresses of the genre along with Helena Ramos and Aldine Müller.

She was cast in the later-to-be controversial film Amor Estranho Amor (1982) where she plays Olga, a cougar-like prostitute who took an interest in the young protagonist, Hugo, played by then 11 year old Marcelo Ribeiro and was the first prostitute to make her move on young Hugo.

She posed for February 1984 issue of Playboy Brasil.

After the fading of pornochanchada in popularity, she passed to other genres, including all films directed by Guilherme de Almeida Prado such as Perfume de Gardênia (1992).

== Personal life ==
Mastrangi is married to actor Oscar Magrini whom she met during the shooting of Uma Ilha Para Três, in 1980. The couple have a daughter named Isabella and live in Atibaia.
