= Lauro Corona =

Brazilian actor (1957–1989)

- Born: Lauro Del Corona; July 6, 1957; Rio de Janeiro, Brazil
- Died: July 20, 1989 (aged 32); Rio de Janeiro, Brazil
- Occupation: Actor
- Years active: 1977–1989

Lauro Del Corona, better known by his stage name Lauro Corona (6 July 1957 – 20 July 1989), was a Brazilian actor who died from AIDS in Rio de Janeiro.

== Television ==
- 1988: Vida Nova as Manuel Victor
- 1987: Direito de Amar as Adriano Monserrat
- 1984: Corpo a Corpo as Rafa da Motta
- 1984: Vereda Tropical as Victor de Oliva Salgado
- 1983: Louco Amor as Lipe Dumont
- 1982: Elas por Elas as Gil Aranha Muniz
- 1981: Baila Comigo as Caê Maia
- 1979: Os Gigantes as Polaco
- 1978: Dancin' Days as Beto Souza Prado Cardoso
