= Christiane Torloni =

Brazilian actress

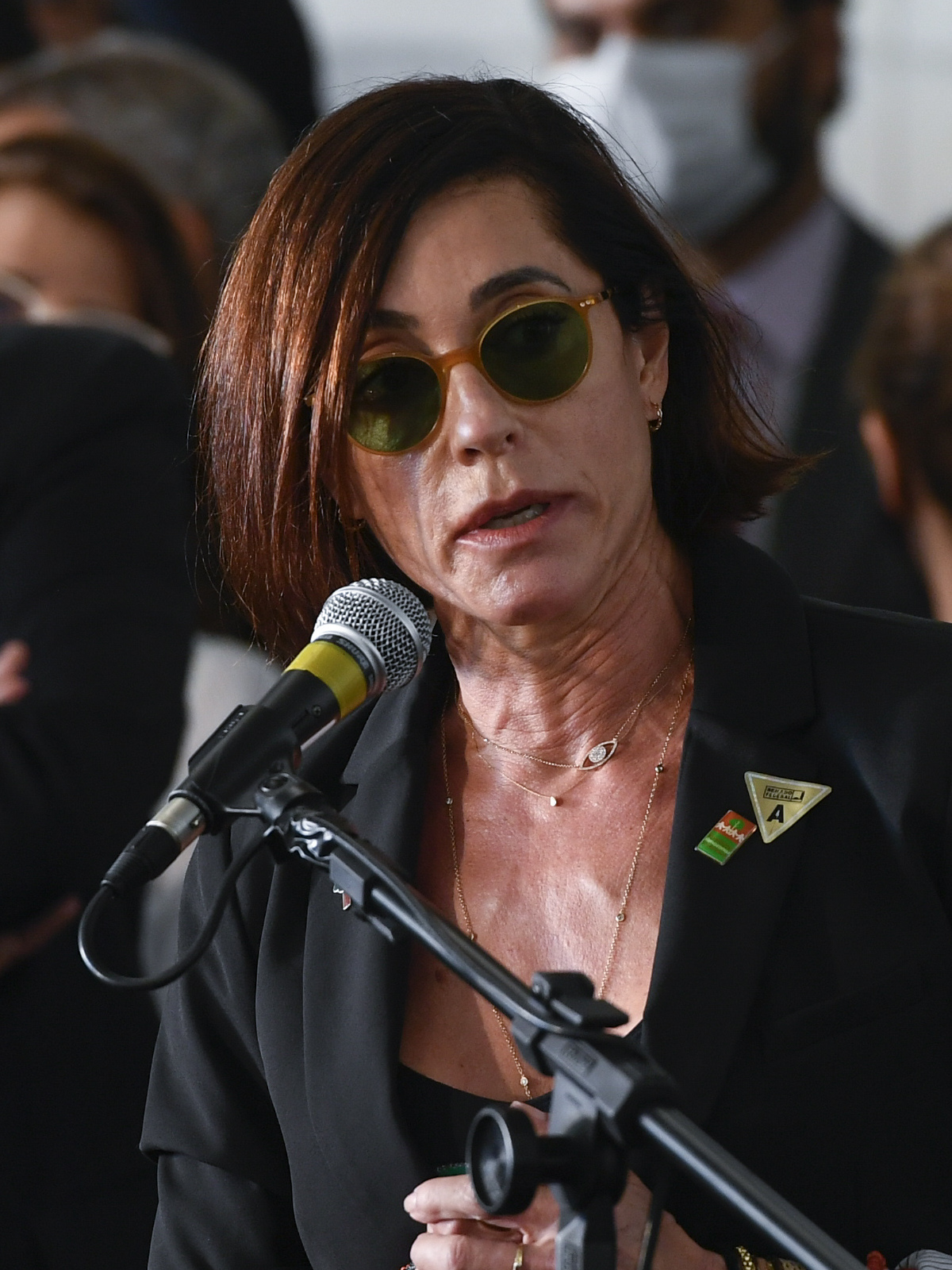
- Torloni in 2022
- Born: Christiane Maria dos Santos Torloni; 18 February 1957 (age 69); São Paulo, Brazil
- Other name: La Torloni
- Occupation: Actress
- Years active: 1969, 1975–present
- Height: 1.70 m (5 ft 7 in)
- Spouses: Dennis Carvalho (m. 1977; div. 1980) Eduardo Mascarenhas (m. 1981; div. 1986)
- Children: 2 (1 deceased)

Christiane Maria dos Santos Torloni (born 18 February 1957) is a Brazilian actress. She is the winner of numerous awards, including an APCA Award, two Prêmios Qualidade Brasil, and a Shell Award, as well as receiving nominations for a Grande Otelo and three Troféu Imprensas. She is one of the most renowned actresses in Brazilian television drama.

Born and raised in São Paulo, Torloni studied theater at IBAM. Since her childhood, she had already decided to be an actress. As a child, she acted as a princess at Teatrinho Trol, on Rede Tupi. But it was at the age of 18 that she actually began his professional career in an episode of Caso Especial, on TV Globo. In 1976, she made her first soap opera, Duas Vidas, and two years later she was already starring in the soap opera Gina. Since then, she has joined the cast of several television productions.

Acting as Jô Penteado in the romantic comedy A Gata Comeu (1985) and the villain Fernanda in the drama Selva de Pedra (1986), Christiane achieved great recognition for her versatility and reached the height of her fame. She was nominated for the Troféu Imprensa her performance in the soap opera A Viagem (1994), one of her most memorable works as the genial Diná. She repeated this feat the following year for her work in Cara & Coroa (1995), playing the lookalikes Fernanda and Vivi.

In 2002, she won the APCA Award for Best Actress on Television for Um Anjo Caiu do Céu. In 2003, she returned to prominence on television playing one of Manoel Carlos' Helenas, in Mulheres Apaixonadas, one of the most successful soap operas of the 2000s. In 2011, she played the memorable villain Tereza Cristina in Fina Estampa, a character that is constantly remembered as one of the greatest of her career. For this work, she received his third nomination for the Troféu Imprensa.

== Biography and career ==
Since the age of 6, she had been playing role-play and at the age of 12 I was playing a little princess at Teatrinho Trol, on Rede Tupi. But the decision to become an actress happened in 1975, when Torloni took a theater course directed by Jaime Barcelos at IBAM. In the same year, at 18, she began her career on Rede Globo's Caso Especial "Indulto de Natal". She is of Spanish, Italian and indigenous descent.

Among the many characters played on television, there are the notable Jô Penteado, from A Gata Comeu (1985), Fernanda Arruda Campos from Selva de Pedra, (1986), Diná from A Viagem (1994) and the twins Fernanda and Vivi from Cara & Coroa (1995), in addition to the villain Tereza Cristina in Fina Estampa. In 1981, Christiane Torloni was the daughter of the first Helena created by Manoel Carlos in the soap opera Baila Comigo, played by Lílian Lemmertz. Twenty-two years later, the actress played one of the author's Helenas in Mulheres Apaixonadas (2003). She also had relevant characters in plots such as Gina, Chega Mais, Elas por Elas, Kananga do Japan, Um Anjo Caiu do Céu, América, Caminho das Indias, Ti Ti Ti, among others. She posed nude for Playboy magazine in March 1983 and November 1984, having also previously posed for Status in February 1980.

In the theater, she subsequently worked with director José Possi Neto in a series of shows in which she sought bodily expressiveness.

La Torloni, as she is sometimes called, has participated in events such as Diretas Já, the fight for democracy and the end of the Military Regime. She has already criticized Brazilian president Lula, declaring herself against re-election in the executive branch.

The actress is involved in various social and environmental causes, which she personally leads. Among the relevant causes are the petition, published on the website amazoniaparasempre.com.br, for the preservation of the Brazilian Amazon, which brought more than one million signatures to the National Congress; as well as the bemquerermulher.com.br campaign that aims to end violence against women in Brazilian society.

Torloni also fights for other causes related to the environment in general, seeking to preserve animal habitats and end deforestation, as well as social causes, such as supporting needy people. She harshly criticized the Bolsonaro government, mainly for the measures that approved the dismantling of Amazon reserves.

In 2011, giving an interview during Rock in Rio on television, he launched the expression "Hoje é dia de rock, bebê!" which ended up making the festival’s history. In the following edition of Rock in Rio in 2013, the phrase, which had become a meme on social media, became an official t-shirt for the event and was even incorporated by the actress in a scene from the soap opera Alto Astral.

== Filmography ==
=== Television ===
| Year | Title | Role | Notes |
|---|---|---|---|
| 1969 | Teatrinho Trol | Princess | |
| 1975 | Caso Especial | | Episode"Indulto de Natal" |
| 1976 | Duas Vidas | Juliana | |
| 1977 | Globo de Ouro | Presenter | |
| 1977 | Sem Lenço, sem Documento | Lívia Duran | |
| 1978 | Gina | Gina | |
| 1979 | Malu Mulher | Sandra | |
| 1980 | Planeta dos Homens | | Special appearance |
| 1980 | Plantão de Polícia | | Episode: "O caso Serginho" |
| 1980 | Chega Mais | Cristina Fonseca | |
| 1981 | Baila Comigo | Lia Seixas Miranda | |
| 1981 | Amizade Colorida | Patrícia | Episode: "Vertigem de alturas" |
| 1981 | Caso Especial | | Episode: "Os amores de Castro Alves" |
| 1982 | Elas por Elas | Cláudia | |
| 1983 | Louco Amor | Lúcia | |
| 1983 | Aplausos | Presenter | |
| 1984 | Partido Alto | Selma | |
| 1984 | Transas e Caretas | Catarina | |
| 1985 | A Gata Comeu | Jô (Joana Penteado) | |
| 1986 | Armação Ilimitada | Henna Zen | |
| 1986 | Selva de Pedra | Fernanda Arruda Campos | |
| 1987 | Corpo Santo | Simone | |
| 1989 | Kananga do Japão | Dora | |
| 1990 | Araponga | Magali | |
| 1991 | O Bispo do Rosário | Rosângela Maria | |
| 1992 | As Noivas de Copacabana | Kátia de Sá Montese | |
| 1994 | A Viagem | Diná Toledo Dias | |
| 1995 | Cara & Coroa | Vivi / Fernanda Santoro | |
| 1997 | Sai de Baixo | Estefânia de Monserrat | Episode: "As mulheres preferem os loiros" |
| 1998 | Mulher | Sulamita | Episode: "De braços abertos" |
| 1998 | Torre de Babel | Rafaela Katz (Neusa Maria da Silva) | |
| 1999 | Mulher | Carmen | Episode: "Anjos e demônios" |
| 1999 | Você Decide | Luiza | Episode: "Profissão: Viúva" |
| 1999 | Você Decide | Amélia | Episode: "Amélia que era mulher de verdade" |
| 1999 | O Belo e as Feras | | Episode: "Um é pouco, duas ... é demais" |
| 2001 | Um Anjo Caiu do Céu | Laila de Montaltino | |
| 2001 | Os Normais | Natasha | Episode: "Um pouco de cultura é normal" |
| 2002 | Os Normais | Sheila | Episode: "Umas loucuras normais" |
| 2003 | Celebridade | | |
| 2003 | Mulheres Apaixonadas | Helena Moraes Ribeiro Alves | |
| 2005 | América | Haydée Pamplona Lopes Prado | |
| 2007 | Amazônia, de Galvez a Chico Mendes | Maria Alonso | |
| 2008 | Dança dos Famosos | Domingão do Faustão | Reality show Won–Dança dos Famosos (season 5) with Álvaro Reis |
| 2008 | Beleza Pura | Sônia Amarante / Estela Fonseca | |
| 2009 | Caminho das Índias | Melissa Cadore | |
| 2010 | Ti Ti Ti | Rebeca Bianchi | |
| 2011 | Fina Estampa | Tereza Cristina Buarque Siqueira de Velmont | |
| 2014 | Alto Astral | Maria Inês Pereira Bittencourt | |
| 2016 | Velho Chico | Iolanda | Second phase |
| 2018 | O Tempo Não Para | Carmen Tercena | |
| 2023 | Vai na Fé | Herself | Guest star |

=== Film ===
| Year | Title | Role |
|---|---|---|
| 1979 | O Bom Burguês | Patrícia /Joana |
| 1980 | Ariella | Mercedes |
| 1981 | O Beijo no Asfalto | Selminha |
| 1981 | Eros, o Deus do Amor | Ana |
| 1982 | Rio Babilônia | Vera Moreira |
| 1982 | Heart and Guts | OLiviana |
| 1984 | Agüenta, Coração | Maria |
| 1985 | Águia na Cabeça | Rose |
| 1987 | Besame Mucho | Dina |
| 1987 | Eu | Beatriz |
| 1993 | Perfume de Gardênia | Adalgisa |
| 1995 | Cinema de Lágrimas | Mother to Raul Cortez |
| 2001 | Ismael e Adalgisa | Adalgisa Nery |
| 2007 | Onde Andará Dulce Veiga? | Layla Van |
| 2010 | Chico Xavier | Glória |

== Theater ==
- 1979 – As Preciosas Ridículas
- 1980 – Bodas de Papel
- 1981 – The Bitter Tears of Petra von Kant
- 1984 – Uncle Vanya
- 1988 – O Lobo de Rayban... Julia Ferraz
- 1989– Orlando
- 1993 – 10 Elevado a menos 43 – Extasis (in Portugal)
- 1994 – Hamlet
- 1997 – Salome... Salomé
- 2000 – Joana D'Arc – A revolta ... Joana D'arc
- 2002 – The Blue Room
- 2004 – Paixão de Cristo: O Auto de Deus – Virgin Mary
- 2005 – Mulheres por um Fio... Elise

== Awards and nominations ==
| Year | Category | Awards | Nominated work | Result |
|---|---|---|---|---|
| 1994 | Best Actress | Troféu Imprensa | A Viagem | Nominated |
| 1995 | Best Actress | Prêmio Contigo | Cara & Coroa | Won |
| 1995 | Best Actress | Troféu Imprensa | Cara & Coroa | Won |
| 2001 | Best Actress | Troféu APCA | Um Anjo Caiu do Céu | Won |
| 2001 | Melhor atriz | Personality of the Year – Isto É Gente | Um Anjo Caiu do Céu | Won |
| 2001 | Best Actress | Prêmio Qualidade Brasil – Rio de Janeiro | Um Anjo Caiu do Céu | Nominated |
| 2003 | Best Actress | Prêmio Contigo | Mulheres Apaixonadas | Nominated |
| 2003 | Best Actress | Prêmio Qualidade Brasil – Rio de Janeiro | Mulheres Apaixonadas | Nominated |
| 2003 | Best Actress | Prêmio Leão de Ouro | Mulheres Apaixonadas | Nominated |
| 2005 | Best Actress | Melhores do Ano | América | Won |
| 2006 | Best Actress | Prêmio Contigo | América | Nominated |
| 2006 | | Fantasporto – 26º Festival Internacional de Cinema do Porto | Award for the whole career by the actress | honoured |
| 2008 | Best Actress | Troféu Super Cap de Ouro | Beleza Pura | Won |
| 2008 | Best Actress | FESTNATAL – Os Favoritos do Público | Beleza Pura | Nominated |
| 2009 | Best Actress | Troféu Super Cap de Ouro | Caminho das Índias | Won |
| 2009 | Best Environmentalist | Troféu Super Cap de Ouro | Amazônia para Sempre (a movement headed by Victor Fasano and Juca de Oliveira) | Won |
| 2010 | Best Actress | Prêmios Contigo de Teatro | A Loba de Ray-Ban | Won |
| 2015 | Best Actress | Prêmio Contigo! de TV | Alto Astral | Nominated |
