= Guilherme Leme =

Brazilian actor (born 1961)

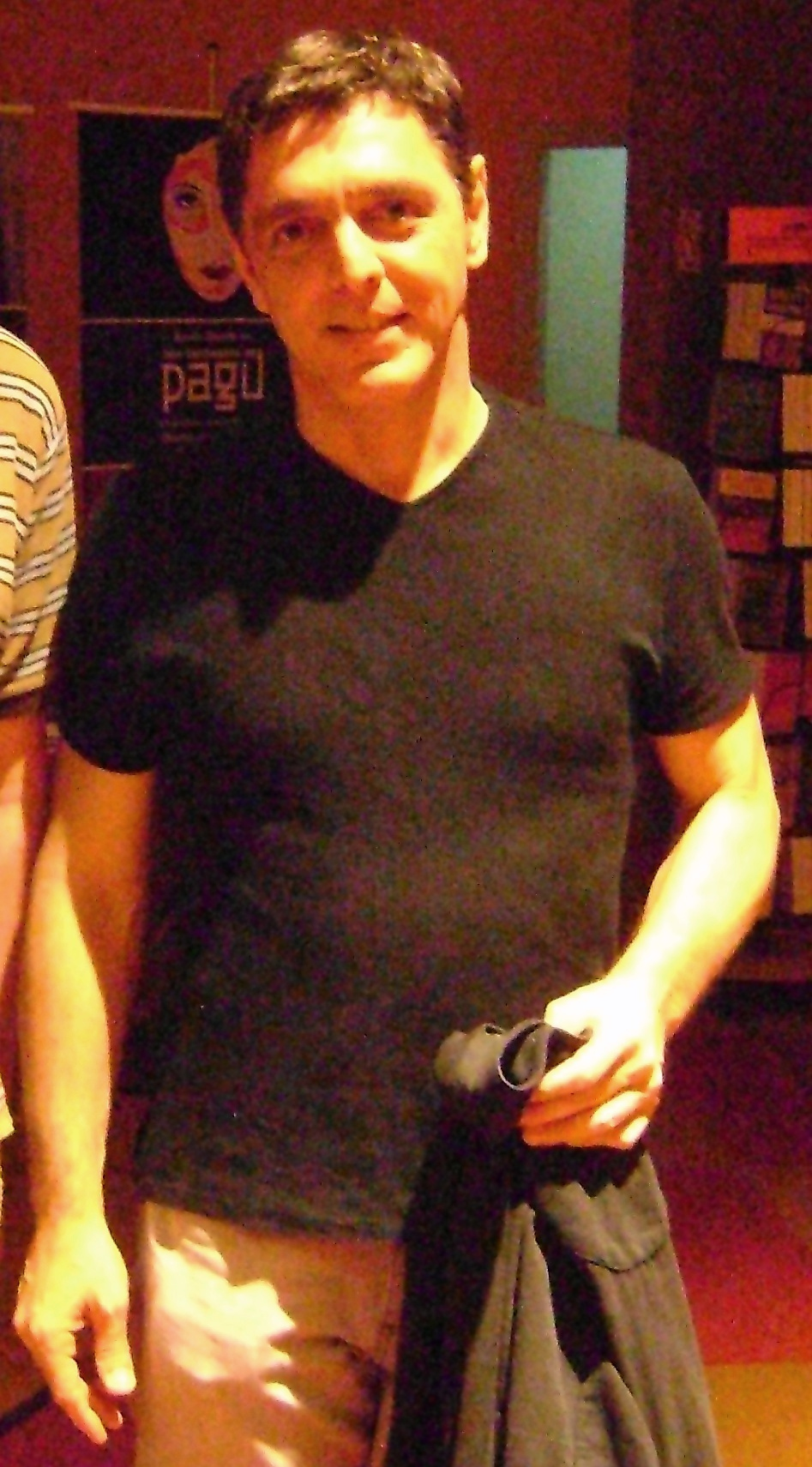
- Guilherme Leme, 2010.
- Born: Guilherme Leme Marcos Garcia; 29 September 1961 (age 64); Lençóis Paulista, Brazil
- Occupation: Actor

Guilherme Leme Marcos Garcia (born 29 September 1961 in Lençóis Paulista) is a Brazilian actor.

== Career ==
Guilherme Leme studied amateur theater in Colégio Objetivo in São Paulo and then at PUC-SP. He had dance classes with Ivaldo Bertazzo, Maria Duchene and Sônia Mota. In New York City, he attended courses of music, dance, mime and theater.

Early in his career, he helped found the Companhia de Teatro São Paulo Brasil, and participated in festivals around the country. In addition to performing, Guilherme has produced several shows like Decadência, Eduardo II, Felizes da Vida, among others.

In his long career, he participated in the telenovelas Bambolê, Bebê a Bordo, Vamp, Perigosas Peruas and De Corpo e Alma. He made a cameo in the children's series Sítio do Picapau Amarelo.

In the cinema, he acted in the movies Benjamim, Erotique and Anjos da Noite. In the latter film, the actor won the Gramado Film Festival award for best supporting actor.

In 2011, he made a cameo on the telenovela Insensato Coração.

Currently, he has been directing plays and also interpreted Meursault in a monologue based on Albert Camus novel L'étranger.

On 13 July 2013, it was reported that Guilherme is treating a throat cancer in the A. C. Camargo hospital. At the end of the treatment, on April 18, 2014, gave an interview to the magazine Quem revealing being cured of cancer.

After 5 years away from television, he returns in A Terra Prometida, Rede Record.

== Filmography ==
=== Television ===
Year	Title	Role	Notes
1987	Bambolê	Alligator	
1988	O Primo Basílio	Pedro	
1988	Bebê a Bordo	Ricardo Antônio Barbirotto (Rico)	
1989	Que Rei Sou Eu?	Roland Barral	
1989	Top Model	Himself	Cameo
1990	Delegacia de Mulheres		Episode: "Chantagem Eletrônica"
1990	Fronteiras do Desconhecido	Adrian	Episode: "O Acidente"
1991	Vamp	Gerald Lamas	
1992	Você Decide		Episode: "Pesadelo"
1992	Perigosas Peruas	Gabriel Fernandes (Angel)	Special participation
1992	De Corpo e Alma	Agenor Pinheiro (Gino)	
1994	Educação para o Trânsito	Himself	
1994	74.5 Uma Onda no Ar	Quim	
1995	Você Decide		Episode: "Pacto de Silêncio"
1995	Sangue do Meu Sangue	Juca	
1996	Caça Talentos	Zack	Season 1
1997	Você Decide		Episode: "Enrascada"
1997	Você Decide		Episode: "Cobiça"
1997	Malhação	Celso	Season 3; special participation
1998	Por Amor	Ary	Special participation
1998	Caça Talentos	Zack	Season 4
1998	Labirinto	Horácio Meireles	
1999	Terra Nostra	Capitão Macário	Special participation
2000	Malhação	Jorge Vasconcelos	Seasons 7–8 (2000–2001)
2002	Sítio do Picapau Amarelo	Hermes	Episodes: "March 25–April 19, 2002"
2006	Floribella	Figueiredo	Season 2; special participation
2008	Chamas da Vida	André	
2011	Insensato Coração	Áquiles Trajano	
2016	A Terra Prometida	Elidade	

=== Film ===
Year	Title	Role
1987	Anjos da Noite	Teddy
1994	Erotique	-
1999	Jaime	António
2001	Minha Vida em Suas Mãos	Bosco
2002	Zico - O Filme	Zeca
2004	Benjamim	Jeovan
2010	Bartô (short film)	Contador
2012	Cores	Roger
