= Night Angels =

1987 film directed by Wilson Barros

Anjos da Noite
- Directed by: Wilson Barros
- Release date: 1987
- Running time: 98 minutes
- Country: Brazil
- Language: Portuguese

Night Angels (Brazilian title: Anjos da Noite) is a 1987 Brazilian drama film directed by Wilson Barros.

== Cast ==
- Zezé Motta as Malu
- Antônio Fagundes as Jorge Tadeu
- Marco Nanini as Guto
- Chiquinho Brandão as Lola / Mauro
- Aida Leiner as Milene
- Cláudio Mamberti as Fofo
- Aldo Bueno as Bimbo
- Ana Ramalho as Maria Clara
- José Rubens Chachá as Leger
- Letícia Imbassahy as Esmeralda
- Guilherme Leme as Teddy
- Be Valério as Cissa
- Marília Pêra as Marta Brum
- Sérgio Mamberti as Apresentador
- Arrigo Barnabé as Arrigo

== Awards ==
The film won several awards at the 1987 Gramado Film Festival, including award for best supporting actor, best actress (co-won with another film), best director, best cinematography, best photography (José Roberto Eliezer) and best Production Design (Cristiano Amaral).
