= Guilherme de Almeida Prado =

Brazilian film director

Guilherme de Almeida Prado (Ribeirão Preto, November 6, 1954) is a Brazilian film director.

Graduated in civil engineering while at the same time doing movies. He also served as assistant director of erotic films.

He founded the production company Star Films and made his first feature film, Flor do desejo (1984) which deals with the relationship between a young marginal and a prostitute in the red light from the port of Santos.

His film, A Dama do Cine Shanghai, won Best Film, Best Director and Critics Prize at the Gramado Film Festival in 1988.

In 2007 he released in the Festival do Rio the film Onde andará Dulce Veiga?, based on the novel by Caio Fernando Abreu.

== Comics ==
In 1991 Guilherme de Almeida Prado wrote the graphic novel Samsara, with art by Hector Gomez;he won the 1991 Troféu HQ Mix of Best Writer.

== Filmography ==
- 2025 - Odradek
- 2025 - A Palavra
- 2007 - Onde Andará Dulce Veiga?
- 1998 - A Hora Mágica
- 1997 - Glaura
- 1992 - Perfume de Gardênia
- 1987 - A Dama do Cine Shanghai
- 1983 - Flor do Desejo
- 1981 - As Taras de Todos Nós
