= Bambolê =

- Genre: Telenovela
- Created by: Daniel Más
- Directed by: Wolf Maya
- Starring: Cláudio Marzo; Susana Vieira; Joana Fomm; Myrian Rios; Paulo Castelli; Rubens de Falco; Sandra Bréa; Thaís de Campos; Carla Marins; Maurício Mattar; Guilherme Leme; Mila Moreira; Herval Rossano; Regina Restelli; Antônio Calloni; Denise Fraga; Rodolfo Bottino; Jacqueline Laurence
- Opening theme: "Conquistador Barato"
- Composer: Léo Jaime
- Country of origin: Brazil
- Original language: Portuguese
- No. of episodes: 173

Original release
- Network: TV Globo
- Release: 7 September 1987 – 25 March 1988

Bambolê is a Brazilian telenovela produced and aired by TV Globo from 7 September 1987 to 25 March 1988, in 173 chapters. It substituted Direito de Amar and was succeeded by Fera Radical, being the 34th "novela das seis" (six o'clock novela) shown by the station.

Based on the novel Chama e Cinzas by Carolina Nabuco, the telenovela was written by Daniel Más, with collaboration from Ana Maria Moretzsohn. It was directed by Wolf Maya, who also served as general director, along with Atílio Riccó, Ignácio Coqueiro, and Marcelo de Barreto.

== Cast ==
- Cláudio Marzo - Álvaro Galhardo
- Susana Vieira - Marta Junqueira
- Joana Fomm - Fausta
- Myrian Rios - Ana Galhardo
- Paulo Castelli - Luiz Fernando
- Rubens de Falco - Nestor Barreto
- Sandra Bréa - Glória Müller / Condessa Von Trop
- Thaís de Campos - Yolanda Galhardo
- Carla Marins - Cristina Galhardo
- Maurício Mattar - Murilo Junqueira
- Guilherme Leme - Aligator
- Mila Moreira - Mumu Soares Sampaio
- Herval Rossano - Antenor
- Regina Restelli - Bete Nigri
- Antônio Calloni - Augusto
- Denise Fraga - Amália
- Rodolfo Bottino - Evaristo de Pádua
- Jacqueline Laurence - Charlotte du Pompé
- Riva Nimitz - Júlia
- Armando Bogus - Gabriel
- Jonas Mello - Delegado Livramento
- Norma Blum - Carmem
- Germano Filho - Manoel
- Carla Daniel - Mara
- Andréa Avancini - Ritinha
- Guido Brunini - Júlio
- Cláudia Lira - Orsina
- Eri Johnson - Canguru
- Jacyra Sampaio - Edite (Bá)
- Guilherme Corrêa - Antônio
- Frederico Mayrink - Felipe José
- Henrique César - Almirante Osório
- Ibanez Filho - Embaixador Flores
- Joyce de Oliveira - Miou
- Leina Krespi - Dona Maria
- Maria Lúcia Dahl - Hermínia
- Antônio Pedro - Abílio
- Tereza Teller - Zuleika
- Cláudio Corrêa e Castro - Zambrini
- Hugo Gross - João Mário
- Paulo Romani - Abílio
- Jorge Cherques - Jorge Bernardo Jó da Silva
