= Perfume de Gardênia =

1992 film directed by Guilherme de Almeida Prado

- Theatrical release poster
- Directed by: Guilherme de Almeida Prado
- Written by: Guilherme de Almeida Prado
- Produced by: Anne French
- Starring: Christiane Torloni; José Mayer
- Cinematography: Cláudio Portioli
- Music by: Hermelino Neder
- Production company: Star Filmes
- Distributed by: RioFilme
- Release date: 1992
- Running time: 118 minutes
- Countries: Brazil; Argentina
- Language: Portuguese
- Budget: $70,000–$80,000

Perfume de Gardênia (Perfume of Gardenia) is a 1992 Brazilian-Argentine drama film directed by Guilherme de Almeida Prado. It was screened at the 1992 Montreal World Film Festival. The filming took place in April 1991, with its production lasting until February 1992.

== Synopsis ==
Daniel is a taxi driver, he works the night to pay the car payments, is married to a housewife Adalgisa and have a son. By chance, she starts making pornochanchada films, abandons the family and is prohibited by Daniel to see Joaquim. For eleven years, Daniel nurtures a sense of revenge, which gains strength when Joaquim, as an adult, finds his mother in full decay professional.

== Cast ==
- Christiane Torloni as Adalgisa
- José Mayer as Daniel
- Marcelo Ribeiro as Joaquim (as a child)
- Walter Quiroz as Joaquim (as an adult)
- Cláudio Marzo as delegate
- Betty Faria as Odete Vargas
- José Lewgoy as Ody Marques
- Raul Gazolla as César Lamas
- Helena Ignez
- Oscar Magrini
- Sérgio Mamberti
- Matilde Mastrangi
- Paulo Villaça

== Awards and nominations ==
Festival de Brasília 1992 (Brazil)

- Won the categories of best actor (José Mayer), best supporting character actor (José Lewgoy) and best supporting character actress (Betty Faria).

Festival de Gramado 1992 (Brazil)

- Nominated for best film.
