= Thaís de Campos =

Brazilian actress, producer, and film director

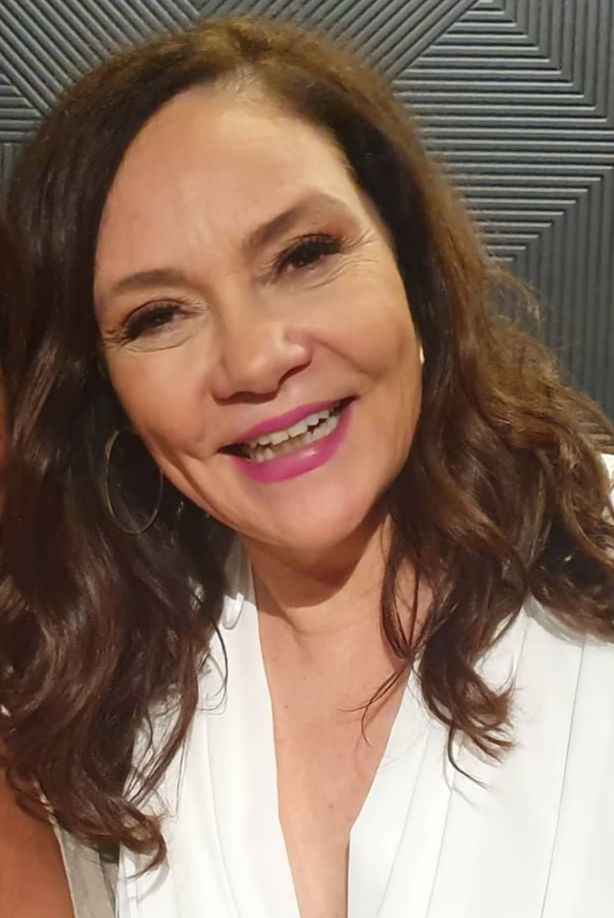
- de Campos in 2018
- Born: November 7, 1963 (age 62); Brasília, DF, Brazil
- Occupations: Actress; producer; director
- Years active: 1981–2014
- Partner: Paulo Bandeira (2003–present)
- Children: 2

Thaís de Campos (born November 7, 1963) is a Brazilian actress, producer, and film director.

== Career ==
Her first job in TV was in the novel Elas por Elas (1982).

She then attended the novels Final Feliz (1983), Voltei pra Você (1983), Livre para Voar (1984), Ti Ti Ti (1985), Mania de Querer (1986), Bambolê (1987), Tieta (1989), Mulheres de Areia (1993), A Viagem (1994), Salsa e Merengue (1996), Pecado Capital (1998) and Kubanacan (2003).

She also participated miniseries of the Tenda dos Milagres (1985), Desejo (1990) and O Quinto dos Infernos (2002), and some episodes of the show Você Decide.

Since 2000, she lives in Portugal, where he directs the course on "Interpretation for TV and Cinema". The course was created in Lisbon in school "Arte6", where he teaches Brazilian actress along with a team of technicians and actors. The course aims to provide training in areas such as soap operas, commercials or presentation programs. Besides directing this course, Thais also produces television series and performs with students attending the course. Meanwhile, his production - Thais Field Audio Visual, Inc. - set up in 2003, which included musical theater for children, comedies and dramas.

When he moved to Portugal, Thais had a two-year-old daughter. There, in 2004, became pregnant with her second daughter.

In 2006, Thais presented in Lisbon, two pieces produced by her, a child, "The Book of Magik" and "Le Club Chez Moi."

In 2007, part of the novel Duas Caras of Rede Globo.

In 2008, Thais Campos joined the cast of the season in São Paulo's play "O Nosso Amor a Gente Inventa".

In 2009, the actress part of the cast of the miniseries Cinquentinha, the Globo.

In 2011, was in the miniseries Lara com Z, and is currently in the novel Fina Estampa, with the character Alice.

In 2012 he made his 1st participation in Malhação interpreting Vilminha, mother Fatinha.

In 2014 returns the television in the novel Boogie Oogie with character Célia.

== Filmography ==
=== Television ===
Year	Title	Role	Notes
1981	Ciranda de Pedra	Sílvia	Participation
1982	Elas por Elas	Cristina Furtado Lopes Pereira (Cris)	
1983	Final Feliz	Lenita	Special participation
1983	Voltei pra Você	Vivinha	
1984	Livre para Voar	Julinha	
1985	Tenda dos Milagres	Marieta	
1985	Ti Ti Ti	Ana Maria de Souza	
1986	Mania de Querer	Marcela	
1987	Bambolê	Yolanda Galhardo	
1989	Tieta	Carmosina (young)	Episode: "August 14, 1989"
1990	Desejo	Augusta	
1993	Mulheres de Areia	Arlete Assunção	
1994	A Viagem	Andrezza Muniz Toledo	
1996	Salsa e Merengue	Amparo Muñoz	
1998	Você Decide		Episode: "Minhas Caras Amigas"
1998	Pecado Capital	Vitória Lisboa	
1999	Você Decide	Magnólia	Episode: "Um Lance Maior"
2002	O Quinto dos Infernos	Arminda	
2003	Kubanacan	Morales de Lulu	Episodes: "August 20–21, 2003"
2007	Duas Caras	Claudine Bel-Lac	
2009	Cinquentinha	Celina Pena	
2011	Lara com Z	Celina Pena	
2011	Fina Estampa	Alice	
2012	Malhação: Intensa como a Vida	Antônia dos Prazeres (Vilminha)	Season 20; Special participation
2014	Boogie Oogie	Célia Dias	

=== Films ===
Year	Title	Role	Notes
1987	Dedé Mamata	Young Avó	
2009	A Amiga Americana		Short film
