= Jaguaraçu =

- Municipality
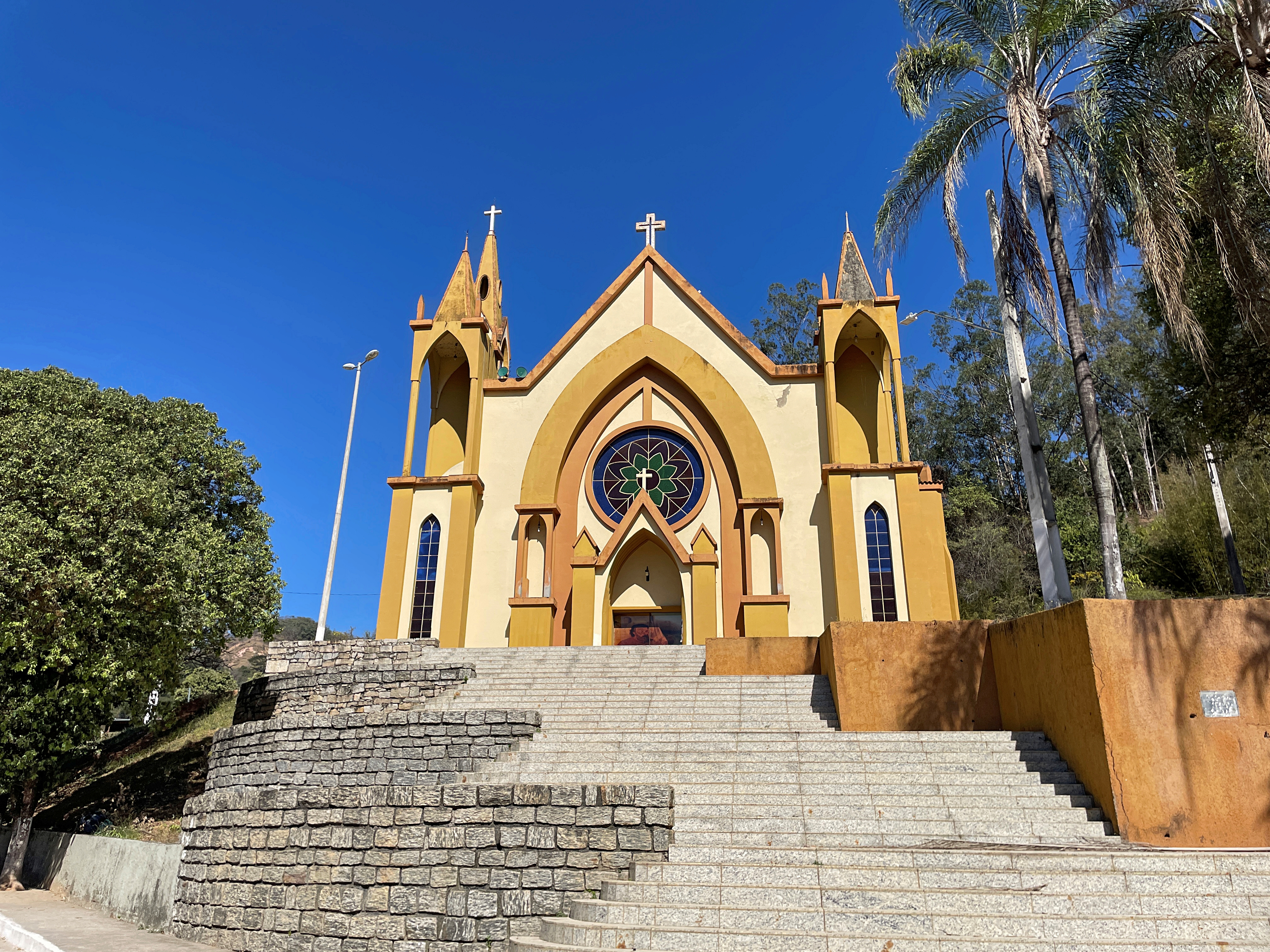
- Saint Joseph Matriz Church

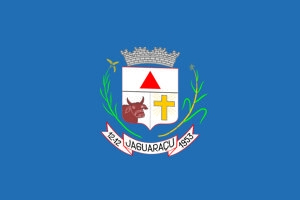
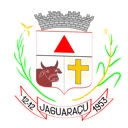
- Flag Coat of arms

- Location in Brazil
- Coordinates: 19°38′56″S 42°45′00″W
- Country: Brazil
- Region: Southeast
- State: Minas Gerais
- Mesoregion: Vale do Rio Doce

Population (2022 Census)
  - Total: 3,092
  - Estimate (2025): 3,181
- Time zone: UTC−3 (BRT)

Jaguaraçu is a municipality in the state of Minas Gerais in the Southeast region of Brazil.

== See also ==
- List of municipalities in Minas Gerais
