= Marcelo Ribeiro (actor) =

Brazilian actor (born 1970)

- Born: 1970 (age 54–55)
- Occupation: Film actor

Marcelo Ribeiro (born 1970) is a Brazilian actor, best known for his role as "the boy" in the movie "Love Strange Love".

In 1981, he was chosen by director Walter Hugo Khouri to participate in "Eros, the God of Love". The following year, the same director wrote "Love Strange Love", a film in which Ribeiro played the pre-adolescent protagonist Hugo alongside Vera Fischer and Xuxa.

After two years, Ribeiro starred in "Sin Horizontal" and after these three films, he did not appear in films, but worked as a film production assistant. In that role, he studied photography and opened a small studio. He is currently a technical and computer instructor at a multinational company. He has started his own website to continue his work.

In 2007, he starred in the pornographic film Estranho Amor directed by J. Gaspar for Brasileirinhas.

== Filmography ==
Year	Title	Role
1981	Eros, o Deus do Amor	Eros (Child)
1982	Pecado Horizontal	German
1982	Amor Estranho Amor	Hugo (Child)
1992	Perfume de Gardênia	Joaquim
2002	Abrigo	Juliano
2007	Estranho Amor	Himself
