= Eros, o Deus do Amor =

1981 film by Walter Hugo Khouri

- Directed by: Walter Hugo Khouri
- Screenplay by: Walter Hugo Khouri
- Starring: Roberto Maya; Norma Bengell; Maria Cláudia; Dina Sfat; Renée de Vielmond; Denise Dumont; Christiane Torloni
- Cinematography: Antonio Meliande
- Edited by: Luiz Elias
- Distributed by: Embrafilme
- Release date: November 12, 1981 (Brazil)
- Running time: 107 minutes
- Country: Brazil
- Language: Portuguese

Eros, o Deus do Amor (English: Eros, the god of love) is a 1981 Brazilian erotic drama film written and directed by Walter Hugo Khouri. The film focuses on Marcelo, a wealthy, philandering businessman who recounts several women that formed his sexuality as he longs to find purpose in life.

== Plot ==
Wealthy Italian-Brazilian businessman Marcelo lives lavishly with his wife Eleonora and their daughter Berenice. His marriage with Eleonora is hostile due to him cheating on her with several women over the years. He meets art gallery curator Ana; despite having a boyfriend and being significantly younger than him, Ana is seduced by Marcelo to become his mistress.

Ana becomes curious about Marcelo's past and how he views love, so Marcelo recounts to Ana all the women he had been sexually attracted to over the years. He recalls being close to his mother and having an unfulfilled incestuous desire towards her. During his time as an adolescent in 1945, Marcelo lusts after his provocative English tutor, Miss Collins. Miss Collins catches him watching her pleasuring herself from erotica and takes his virginity. Years before as a child in 1935, he has encountered and become drawn to the leader of a Communist group fleeing the authorities and follows her to their hideout at an old castle. Later on, he finds the family house servant Lígia eating in the barn house with her clothing barely on; she decides to strip naked in front of the young Marcelo.

Although he inherits his family's conglomerate as an adult, Marcelo becomes a philanderer, causing him to neglect his family. He carries on affairs with several women at his private penthouse on the top floor of his company. He admits, however, that he is often underwhelmed by them and rarely gives him satisfaction. Berenice, now in college, comes upon her parents threatening divorce over Marcelo's infidelity. Marcelo disapproves over her choice to pursue social work, and Berenice laments their deteriorating relationship, noting that he is still aimless in life and has not changed from his perverted ways, even seducing students from her school. While Marcelo begins lustfully ogling at his daughter, Berenice expresses that she could not describe what he looks like.

Ana is disheartened from Marcelo's callous disregard towards his former lovers, and realizes that he wants a woman who is the culmination of all the women he had lusted after. Knowing she could never fully fulfill his desires, Ana breaks up with him. He tries to win her back but she rejects him when she notices him staring at another woman while they are speaking. Marcelo decides to begin dating the woman, an actress also named Ana. He later visits Ana on the set of her movie, set in the castle where he had followed the Communists as a child; there, he hallucinates another actress as the Communist leader. He has a final childhood flashback of him and his mother watching an aggressive caged bear at a zoo.

== Cast ==
- Roberto Maya as Marcelo, a 48 year-old wealthy and promiscuous businessman and owner of a family-owned empire, and the film's narrator and primary point-of-view, with the story being told through his perspective.
  - Marcelo Ribeiro as young Marcelo
- Denise Dumont as Ana, an art gallery worker who is Marcelo's significantly younger mistress during the film's events.
- Dina Sfat as Marcelo's mother, with whom Marcelo had a close relationship, and had a one-sided incestuous attraction towards.
- Lilian Lemmertz as Eleonora, Marcelo's scorned wife and Berenice's mother. She often argues with her husband over his affairs despite him denying them. She is ironically the only woman in the film that is not seen in a sexual way by Marcelo.
- Lala Deheinzelin as Berenice, Marcelo and Eleonora's daughter and a socially-conscious college student, who is briefly lusted after by her father.
- Norma Bengell as Ada, a former lover of Marcelo who tries to ask money from him.
- Maria Cláudia as Annelise, an astronomer who was one of Marcelo's former lovers.
- Renée de Vielmond as Ana, a leader of a Communist group that Marcelo encounters as a child. She is referred as "Ana III" in the credits.
- Christiane Torloni as Ana, a young actress who becomes Marcelo's new mistress by the film's conclusion. She is referred as "Ana II" in the credits.
- Kate Lyra as Miss Collins, Marcelo's nymphomaniac English teacher who took his virginity as an adolescent.
- Alvamar Taddei as Lígia, a house servant of Marcelo's family who undressed in front of Marcelo when he was a child.
- Nicole Puzzi as Berenice, one of Marcelo's former lovers who had been with him for seven years, and who shares a name with Marcelo's daughter. She was a young teenaged student who was unfamiliar with sex when she began her relationship with Marcelo; during her affair with him, she becomes more free-spirited. She is referred as "Berenice II" in the credits.
- Patrícia Scalvi as Renata, a prostitute who had sex with Marcelo alongside Lilit.
- Monique Lafond as Lilit, a prostitute who had sex with Marcelo alongside Renata.
- Serafim Gonzalez as Léo, the director of Ana's film.
- Suely Aoki as Midouri, a woman Marcelo has sex with during a visit to Japantown.
- Kate Hansen as a sculptor who becomes one of Marcelo's former lovers.
- Dorothée-Marie Bouvier as Ruth, a teacher of Marcelo who taught his class about Eros, the god of love.
- Selma Egrei as one of Marcelo's former lovers, who likes masochism.

== Production ==
Marcelo Ribeiro revealed that in the sex scene with Kate Lyra, he used duct tape on his private parts to avoid getting an erection. "In my first film, I didn't really know how to act. They put duct tape "there" because I couldn't control myself. It was difficult," he said.

== Awards ==
São Paulo Association of Art Critics Awards

1. Best Picture
2. Best Actress (Tied with Norma Bengell, Renée de Vielmond and Dina Sfat)
3. Best Director (Walter Hugo Khouri)
