= Vera Fischer (actress) =

Brazilian actress (born 1951)

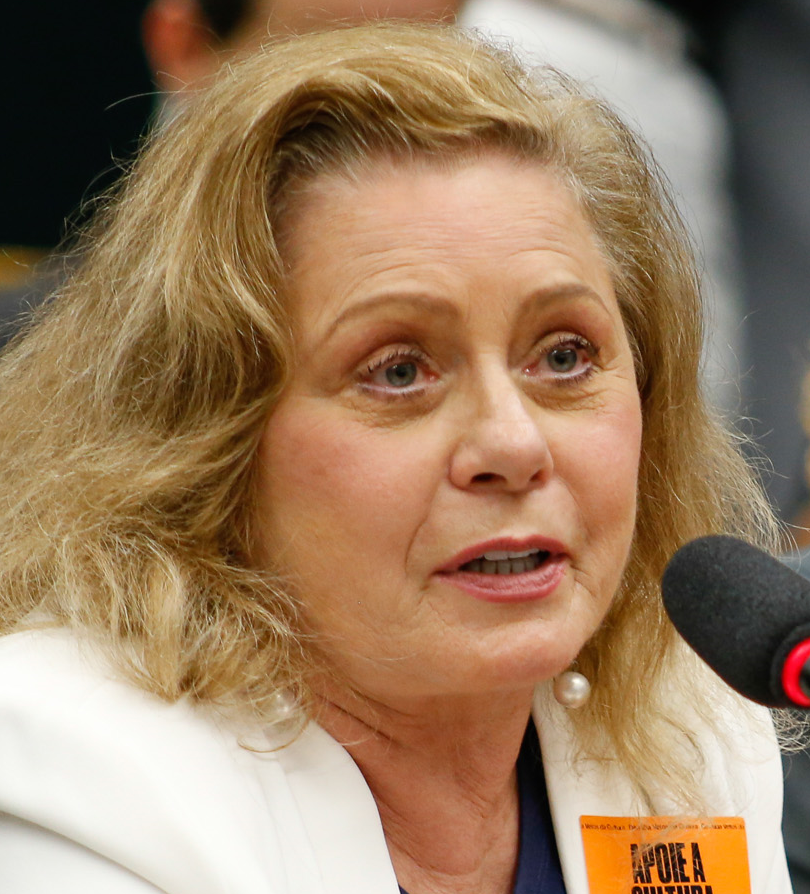
- Fischer in 2022
- Born: 27 November 1951 (age 74); Blumenau, Santa Catarina, Brazil
- Occupation: Actress
- Spouses: Perry Salles (m. 1972; div. 1987) Felipe Camargo (m. 1988; div. 1995)
- Children: 2
- Parent(s): Hildegard Berndt (mother); Emil Fischer (father)
- Beauty pageant titleholder
- Title: Miss Brazil 1969
- Years active: 1972–present
- Major competitions: Miss Brazil 1969 (Winner); Miss Universe 1969 (Top 15)

Vera Fischer (Portuguese pronunciation: [ˈvɛɾa ˈfiʃeʁ]; born 27 November 1951) is a Brazilian actress and beauty pageant titleholder who was crowned Miss Brazil 1969 and represented her country at Miss Universe 1969 where she placed Top 15.

== Early life ==
Fischer was born in Blumenau, Santa Catarina, to Hildegard Berndt, a Brazilian of German descent, and Emil Fischer, a German. She was raised Protestant. According to Fischer's autobiography, her father was a Nazi and beat her.

Until age five, Fischer spoke only German; she started to learn Portuguese at school.

== Career ==
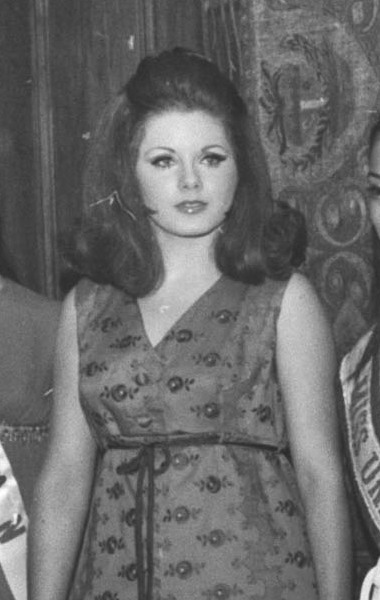
Fischer in 1969

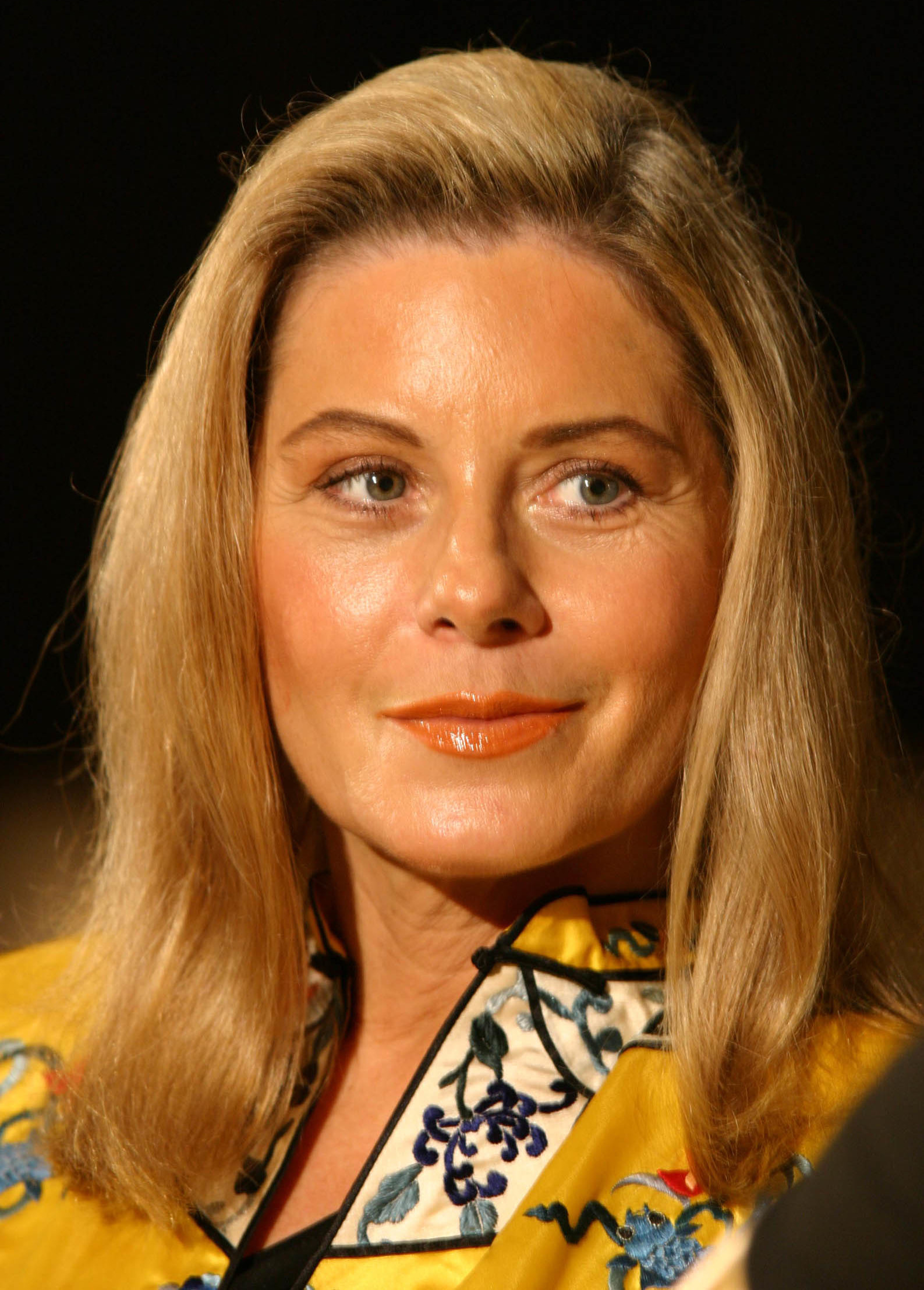
Fischer in 2004

Fischer was crowned Miss Brazil in 1969. She was also a semi-finalist at Miss Universe 1969.

She appeared in the film A Superfêmea, a pornochanchada of 1973, and the play A Primeira Noite de Um Homem (2004), an adaptation of The Graduate by Miguel Falabella.

She has starred in telenovelas such as O Clone ("The Clone") and Laços de Família ("Family Ties").

== Filmography ==
=== Television ===
Year	Title	Role
1977	Espelho Mágico	Diana Queiroz / Débora
1978	Sinal de Alerta	Sulamita Montenegro (Sula)
1979	Os Gigantes	Helena Porto
1980	Coração Alado	Vívian Ribas
1981	Obrigado, Doutor	Helena (Episode: "Por um Fio de Vida)
1981	Brilhante	Luiza Sampaio
1983	Quatra-Nobre	Claudia Prado
1986	Sinhá Moça	Alcina
1987	Mandala	Jocasta Silveira
1988	Tarcísio e Glória	Lucrécia
1990	Riacho Doce	Eduarda
1990	Desejo	Ana Emília Ribeiro da Cunha Assis (Saninha)
1992	Perigosas Peruas	Maria Aparecida Falcão Belotto (Cidinha)
1993	Agosto	Alice
1994	Pátria Minha	Lídia Thompson Laport
1996	O Rei do Gado	Nena Mezenga
1998	Você Decide	Annie
1998	Pecado Capital	Laura Medeiros Lisboa
1999	O Belo e as Feras	Celeste
2000	Laços de Família	Helena Lacerda Soriano
2001	O Clone	Yvete Simas Ferraz
2003	Agora É que São Elas	Antônia Mendes Galvão
2004	Senhora do Destino	Vera Barroso (Mrs. Robinson)
2005	América	Úrsula Garcez
2007	Amazônia, de Galvez a Chico Mendes	Lola
2007	Duas Caras	Dolores Maciel
2008	Casos e Acasos	Vera (Episode: "O Desejo Escondido")
2008	Casos e Acasos	Vera (Episode: "O Cara Deprimido e O Livro Roubado")
2009	Caminho das Índias	Chiara Bittencourt
2010	Afinal, o Que Querem as Mulheres?	Celeste Monteiro
2011	Insensato Coração	Catarina Diniz
2012	Salve Jorge	Irina Drummond (Simone)
2016	Tá no Ar	Helena Lacerda Soriano
2018	Malhação: Vidas Brasileiras	Ana Tanquerey
2018	Espelho da Vida	Carmo
2018	Assédio	Haidée

=== Film ===
Year	Title	Role
1972	Sinal vermelho – As fêmeas	Angela
1973	A Superfêmea	Eva
1973	Anjo Loiro	Laura
1973	As Delícias da Vida	Fernanda
1974	Essa Gostosa Brincadeira a Dois	Lígia
1974	As Mulheres que Fazem Diferente	Marília
1974	Macho e Fêmea	Juliano (Woman)
1975	Intimidade	Tânia Velasco
1980	Perdoa-me por me traíres	Judite
1981	Bonitinha mas Ordinária	Ritinha/Bonitinha
1981	I Love You	Barbara Bergman
1982	Love Strange Love	Anna
1982	Dora Doralina	Dora
1984	Amor Voraz	Anna
1984	Quilombo	Ana de Ferro
1989	Doida Demais	Letícia
1990	The 5th Monkey	Mrs. Watts
1991	Forever	Cristina Teller
1993	Fala Baixo, Senão Eu Grito	
1997	Navalha na Carne	Neuza Suely
2002	Xuxa e os Duendes 2: No Caminho das Fadas	Queen Dara
2026	Velhos Bandidos	

Preceded by Martha Vasconcellos (Miss Universe)	Miss Universo Brasil; 1969	Succeeded by Eliane Fialho Thompson
