= João Carlos Barroso =

Brazilian actor (1950–2019)

- Born: João Carlos de Albuquerque Melo Barroso; 28 February 1950; Rio de Janeiro, Brazil
- Died: 12 August 2019 (aged 69); Rio de Janeiro, Brazil
- Occupation: Actor
- Years active: 1961–2019

João Carlos de Albuquerque Melo Barroso (February 28, 1950 - August 12, 2019) was a Brazilian actor.

== Career ==
Barroso began his acting career when Argentine producers met eleven-year-old João Carlos playing soccer on the sidewalks of Bolivar street in Copacabana. Later he was invited to participate in "Tercer Mundo" film which was shot in the hills of the city. This film was a Brazil-Argentina co-production filmed in 1961 and released only in 1973. With his work in this film, he was invited to perform in Luigi Pirandello's play "Man, Beast and Virtue". For his performance, Barroso received several theatrical revelation awards in 1962. Barroso made his debut on Rede Globo in the series "Rua da Matriz", the station's first dramaturgical production, in 1965, mending a sequence of productions by the company over the next decades. Among his most popular TV characters are Tavico in Estúpido Cupido (1976) and Toninho Jiló in Roque Santeiro (1985), the latter his most outstanding character. Barroso died on August 12, 2019, in Rio de Janeiro after a long battle against pancreatic cancer.

== Filmography ==
Year	Title	Role	Notes
1976	O Pistoleiro	Jose	
1979	Nos Tempos da Vaselina	Onofre	
2001-2002	Malhação	Delegado Almeidinha	8 Season
2002	Sítio do Picapau Amarelo	Tião Susto	TV series
2015-2016	Zorra	Various	TV series
2016-2017	Sol Nascente	Miranda / Mesquita	TV series, (final appearance)
